= New Zealand women's cricket team in Australia in 1997–98 =

	Australia	New Zealand
- Dates: 2 – 8 November 1997
Captains	Belinda Clark	Maia Lewis

One Day International series
- Results: Australia won the 3-match series 2–1
Most runs	Belinda Clark (116)	Emily Drumm (171)
Most wickets	Charmaine Mason (8)	Kathryn Ramel (4); Catherine Campbell (4); Clare Nicholson (4)

The New Zealand women's national cricket team toured Australia in November 1997. They played against Australia in three One Day Internationals, which were to contest the Rose Bowl. Australia won the series 2–1.

== Squads ==
Australia	New Zealand
Belinda Clark (c); Joanne Broadbent; Bronwyn Calver; Jodi Dannatt; Avril Fahey; Cathryn Fitzpatrick; Zoe Goss; Michelle Goszko; Mel Jones; Lisa Keightley; Olivia Magno; Charmaine Mason; Julia Price (wk); Karen Rolton	Maia Lewis (c); Kelly Brown; Catherine Campbell; Emily Drumm; Shelley Fruin; Losi Harford; Debbie Hockley; Katrina Keenan; Karen Le Comber; Clare Nicholson; Rachel Pullar; Kathryn Ramel; Rebecca Rolls (wk)

== Tour Match ==
=== 50-over match: New South Wales v New Zealand ===
2 November 1997
Scorecard

New Zealand; 207/9 (50 overs)	v	New South Wales; 183 (49 overs)
Emily Drumm 80 (107); Terry McGregor 4/34 (10 overs)		E Keen 76* (147); Katrina Keenan 4/33 (10 overs)

New Zealand Women won by 24 runs
Jensen Oval, Sydney
Umpires: Ken Duffy (Aus) and DL Eldridge (Aus)

- New Zealand Women won the toss and elected to bat.

== WODI Series ==
=== 1st ODI ===
5 November 1997
Scorecard

Australia; 169/5 (45 overs)	v	New Zealand; 164/9 (45 overs)
Bronwyn Calver 52* (79); Clare Nicholson 2/23 (8 overs)		Emily Drumm 83 (119); Charmaine Mason 4/24 (9 overs)

Australia Women won by 5 runs
Bankstown Oval, Sydney
Umpires: PF Hughes (Aus) and RH Bent (Aus)

- New Zealand Women won the toss and elected to field.
- Match reduced to 45 overs per side due to rain.
- Losi Harford, Rachel Pullar and Kathryn Ramel (NZ) all made their WODI debuts.

=== 2nd ODI ===
7 November 1997
Scorecard

Australia; 172 (48.3 overs)	v	New Zealand; 111 (43 overs)
Belinda Clark 56 (65); Katrina Keenan 3/34 (9.3 overs)		Kathryn Ramel 29 (70); Charmaine Mason 4/18 (7 overs)

Australia Women won by 61 runs
Bankstown Oval, Sydney
Umpires: Ken Duffy (Aus) and PF Hughes (Aus)

- Australia Women won the toss and elected to bat.

=== 3rd ODI ===
8 November 1997
Scorecard

Australia; 167 (49.5 overs)	v	New Zealand; 168/9 (48.5 overs)
Joanne Broadbent 54 (126); Kathryn Ramel 3/26 (8.5 overs)		Emily Drumm 64 (115); Karen Rolton 2/29 (8 overs)

New Zealand Women won by 1 wicket
Bankstown Oval, Sydney
Umpires: DL Eldridge (Aus) and RH Bent (Aus)

- Australia Women won the toss and elected to bat.
- Jodi Dannatt and Michelle Goszko (Aus) both made their WODI debuts.
