= 1997 Women's Cricket World Cup final =

Cricket match

1997 Women's Cricket World Cup Final
- Event: 1997 Women's Cricket World Cup
New Zealand	Australia
(New Zealand)	(Australia)
164	165/5
49.3 overs	47.4 overs
- Australia won by 5 wickets
- Date: 29 December 1997
- Venue: Eden Gardens, Calcutta, India
- Player of the match: Debbie Hockley (NZ)
- Umpires: Aloke Bhattacharjee (Ind) and S. Choudhary (Ind)

The 1997 Women's Cricket World Cup Final was a one-day cricket match between Australia and New Zealand played on 29 December 1997 at Eden Gardens in Calcutta, India. It marked the culmination of the 1997 Women's Cricket World Cup, the sixth edition of the tournament. Australia won the final by five wickets, clinching their fourth World Cup title. It was Australia's third appearance in a World Cup final, while New Zealand were making their second successive appearance.

Both teams finished top of their respective groups in the first stage of the competition, and won their quarter-finals by a wide margin. In the semi-finals, Australia beat the hosts, India by 19 runs in a rain-reduced match, while New Zealand defeated, the reigning champions England by 20 runs. The New Zealand captain, Maia Lewis won the toss and opted to bat first. Her side were bowled out for 164 runs. Only three New Zealand players reached double figures, including Debbie Hockley, whose score of 79 earned her the player of the match accolade. In their response, Australia started well, and a second-wicket partnership of 71 runs between Belinda Clark and Michelle Goszko meant that despite some late pressure from the New Zealand bowlers, Australia reached the winning total with 14 deliveries remaining.

== Background ==
The 1997 Women's Cricket World Cup was the sixth Women's Cricket World Cup. The first had been held in 1973, pre-dating the first men's Cricket World Cup by two years. The 1997 tournament featured eleven teams, the most in the tournament's history; Australia, Denmark, England, India, Ireland, Netherlands, New Zealand, Pakistan, South Africa, Sri Lanka and the West Indies. The tournament had originally been scheduled to feature twelve teams: Japan and Canada were also invited but were unable to take part, and a late attempt to involve Bangladesh also failed. The tournament took place from 9 to 29 December 1997, featuring 33 matches over 21 days. Australia and England had won all of the previous tournaments; Australia had three titles, and England, the reigning champions, had two.

== Route to the final ==
=== Australia ===
Australia competed in Group A of the competition, along with Denmark, England, Ireland, Pakistan and South Africa. Their first match, against Ireland, was abandoned due to rain which washed out three of the first five contests, meaning that Australia and Ireland shared the points. Facing South Africa two days later, Australia restricted their opponents to 163 runs, and then chased down the total without loss; their openers, Belinda Clark and Joanne Broadbent scored 93 and 61 respectively. In their third match, Australia faced Pakistan, who had only formed their team the previous year. Australia bowled Pakistan out for 27, the fifth lowest total in Women's One Day Internationals, (Note: As of 2020: at the time, the total was the second-lowest in Women's One Day Internationals, only Pakistan's own total of 23, also against Australia, from February 1997 was lower.) and won the match by nine wickets. Against Denmark in their next match, Clark scored 229 not out, the first double century scored in women's or men's One Day International cricket. Australia finished on 412 for three, (Note: "412 for three" is cricket notation which could also be written 412/3, and signifies that the batting team has scored 412 runs, and has lost three of its ten wickets. See Scoring (cricket) for more information.) which is the highest total in a Women's World Cup match, and after bowling Denmark out for 49 runs, they also secured the largest margin of victory in Women's World Cup history, winning by 363 runs. In their final group stage match, Australia bowled England out for 95, and completed an eight-wicket win with more than 23 overs remaining. They finished top of Group A with 27 points, and qualified for the quarter-finals.

Australia faced the Netherlands in the quarter-finals. After winning the toss, Australia chose to bat first, and scored 223 for four; Bronwyn Calver scored 74, and Mel Jones 43. In response, the Netherlands were restricted to 108 for six, meaning that Australia progressed to the semi-finals after securing a 115-run victory. In the semi-finals, Australia met India, who had finished second in Group B. The hosts won the toss and invited Australia to bat first in a match which was reduced to 32 overs per side due to rain. Australia scored 123 for seven led by scores of 33 and 31 from Broadbent and Clark. Due to a slow over rate, India were penalised two overs, and so only had 30 overs in which to bat. They closed their innings on 104 for nine; Cathryn Fitzpatrick took three wickets for Australia as they won by 19 runs.

=== New Zealand ===
New Zealand were placed in Group B, which due to the uneven number of teams, only featured four other sides; India, Netherlands, Sri Lanka and the West Indies. When the New Zealand team had left home, they were expecting to play Bangladesh in the opening round of matches, but in their absence, New Zealand did not begin their campaign until the third day of the tournament. In a rain-reduced match of 20 overs per side, the Netherlands scored 48 for eight, which New Zealand chased down in 8.1 overs to win by eight wickets. They enjoyed similarly facile victories in each of their next two matches. Against Sri Lanka, unbeaten scores of 100 and 57 for Debbie Hockley and Katrina Withers helped New Zealand score 236 for three. They then bowled Sri Lanka out for 71 runs, and won by 165 runs. Two days later against the West Indies, they won by an even larger margin; another century from Hockley helped to set up a 198-run victory. New Zealand faced India in their final group match, and scored 176 for nine after batting first. In their chase, India began well, and looked likely to win the match, but collapsed from 150 for four, and the teams tied the match. New Zealand finished as group winners, three points ahead of India.

Drawn against Ireland in the quarter-finals, New Zealand chose to bat first, and scored 244 for three; Hockley and Emily Drumm each made half-centuries. They then restricted Ireland to 105 for nine during their chase, to secure a 139-run victory. In the semi-finals, they faced England, who had finished as runners-up in Group A. The four semi-finalists were the same teams which had finished as the top four teams at the 1993 Women's Cricket World Cup. New Zealand once again batted first after winning the toss, and scored 175 for six; Hockley and Withers were their top-scorers with 43 and 35 respectively. As in the other semi-final, the second innings was shortened, as England were penalised one over for a slow over-rate, though the England team protested that the umpires had not allowed extra time for a number of stoppages during the New Zealand innings. As it was, England were bowled out for 155; New Zealand won by 20 overs and secured their second successive final.

== Match ==
=== Summary ===
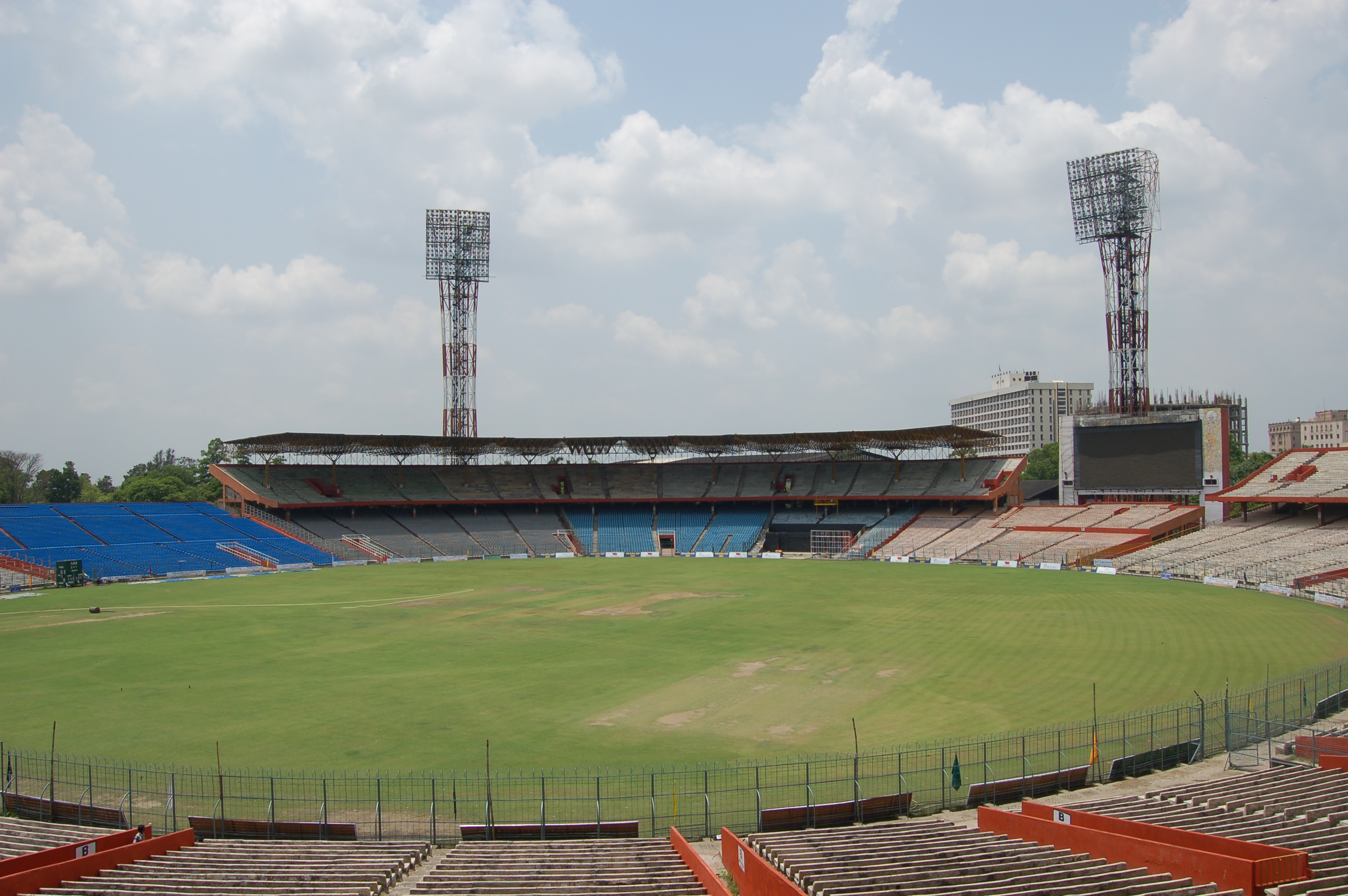
The Eden Gardens hosted the final. (Pictured prior to a match in 2007.)

The final was held at the Eden Gardens, in Calcutta, India, on 29 December 1997. The crowd was reported to be in excess of 50,000, partly due to the local government providing transportation for local women to attend the match, though estimates varied. A state government official suggested the crowd to be around 80,000, while the Australian team manager Chris Matthews provided a more modest estimate of "more than 25,000". In 2017, reflecting on the match, Clark said: "To this day, I don't know how many people were there at Eden Gardens that day. I've heard different variations. One thing I can tell you, though, is my eardrums were buzzing; I hadn't played in front of such a crowd ever before." The attendance was unusually high for a women's cricket match; Melinda Farrell, an Australian cricket journalist, described it as "an outlier in women's cricket for 23 years". Some of the players found the atmosphere distracting, as it was something they were unused to; Hockley said that it was difficult to hear the others players, and "until you're there you don't realise that's actually what happens. It probably happens at men's games all the time."

Aloke Bhattacharjee and S. Choudhary were appointed as the umpires for the match. Clark described the pitch as atypical for an Indian ground, as it had a lot of grass left on the wicket. The New Zealand captain, Lewis, won the toss and chose to bat first. Writing in The Times, Thrasy Petropoulos suggested that much of New Zealand's hopes of winning rested on their opening batters, Hockley and Drumm, and how they would cope with Australia's fast bowler, Fitzpatrick. Instead, it was the medium-pace of Calver who took the first two wickets, bowling Drumm for six runs, and having Shelley Fruin caught by Clark for eight runs. Katrina Withers, New Zealand's next batter, was dismissed by what Petropoulos described as "the ball of the day", when she edged an outswinging delivery from Charmaine Mason to the wicket-keeper, Julia Price. Withers had scored five, and New Zealand were 49 for three. Lewis was trapped leg before wicket (lbw) by the right-arm leg spin of Olivia Magno for 10 runs, and shortly after Kathryn Ramel was the first of two New Zealand batters to be run out, having only scored one run. Despite the regular loss of wickets, New Zealand maintained a steady run rate, and Hockley anchored their innings. Karen Rolton, who finished with Australia's best bowling analysis, took the next two wickets; she had Clare Nicholson adjudged lbw for two runs, and then Sarah McLauchlan was stumped for eight, moving New Zealand onto 125 for seven. The New Zealand wicket-keeper, Rebecca Rolls, was one of few batters to provide support for Hockley, scoring 18 runs out of a partnership of 30 with the opener. Hockley was dismissed in the 47th over, bowled by Fitzpatrick for 79 runs, including 7 fours and 1 six. Rolls was dismissed soon after, caught by Calver off the bowling of Mason. New Zealand's final two batters, Catherine Campbell and Kelly Brown added seven more runs before Brown was run out, ending their team's innings on 164 all out.

Australia opened the batting in their chase with Broadbent and Clark; the pair put on 36 runs together before Broadbent was caught by Lewis off the bowling of Ramel for 15 runs. Michelle Goszko joined Clark, and the two New South Wales teammates pushed Australia ahead of the required rate of 3.3 runs per over. Goszko was bowled by Withers for 37 runs, and had shared a partnership of 71 runs with Clark, taking Australia to 107 for two. Clark said that the partnership "got enough runs for the rest of the team to build on". Clark was the next batter to be dismissed, when she was caught and bowled by Campbell shortly after reaching her half-century. Australia were 135 for three, and needed 30 runs from the final 12 overs to win. Although Clark felt that Australia were in control of the match, economical bowling from New Zealand put pressure on the Australian batters. Rolton and Jones added another 36 runs before Jones was bowled by Keenan for 17; Rolton was dismissed soon after, caught by Brown off the bowling of Ramel for 24. Calver scored the winning runs for Australia with 14 deliveries remaining.

=== Scorecard ===
- Toss: New Zealand won the toss and elected to bat first
- Result: Australia won by five wickets

New Zealand batting innings
Batsman	Method of dismissal	Runs	Balls	SR
Debbie Hockley	b Cathryn Fitzpatrick	79	121	65.28
Emily Drumm	b Bronwyn Calver	6	17	35.29
Shelley Fruin	c Belinda Clark b Bronwyn Calver	8	30	26.66
Katrina Withers	c Julia Price † b Charmaine Mason	5	10	50.00
Maia Lewis *	lbw b Olivia Magno	10	33	30.30
Kathryn Ramel	run out	1	9	11.11
Clare Nicholson	lbw b Karen Rolton	2	16	12.50
Sarah McLauchlan	st Julia Price † b Karen Rolton	8	21	38.09
Rebecca Rolls †	c Bronwyn Calver b Charmaine Mason	18	24	75.00
Catherine Campbell	not out	3	12	25.00
Kelly Brown	run out	1	4	25.00
Extras	(10 leg byes, 13 wides)	23		
Totals	(49.3 overs)	164	3.31 runs per over	

Australia bowling
Bowler	Overs	Maidens	Runs	Wickets	Economy
Cathryn Fitzpatrick	10	2	22	1	2.20
Bronwyn Calver	10	1	29	2	2.90
Charmaine Mason	9.3	1	32	2	3.36
Olivia Magno	6	1	28	1	4.66
Karen Rolton	6	1	25	2	4.16
Avril Fahey	8	1	18	0	2.25

Australia batting innings
Batsman	Method of dismissal	Runs	Balls	SR
Belinda Clark *	c & b Catherine Campbell	52	81	64.19
Joanne Broadbent	c Maia Lewis b Kathryn Ramel	15	50	30.00
Michelle Goszko	b Katrina Withers	37	54	68.51
Karen Rolton	c Kelly Brown b Kathryn Ramel	24	51	47.05
Mel Jones	b Katrina Withers	17	37	45.94
Bronwyn Calver	not out	7	14	50.00
Olivia Magno	not out	0	0	–
Extras	(5 byes, 4 leg byes, 1 no ball, 5 wides)	13		
Totals	(47.4 overs)	165/5	3.46 runs per over	
Did not bat: Julia Price †, Charmaine Mason, Cathryn Fitzpatrick, Avril Fahey

New Zealand bowling
Bowler	Overs	Maidens	Runs	Wickets	Economy
Katrina Withers	10	2	23	2	2.30
Clare Nicholson	10	3	26	0	2.60
Kelly Brown	1	0	10	0	10.00
Kathryn Ramel	4.4	0	23	2	4.92
Catherine Campbell	10	1	36	1	3.60
Sarah McLauchlan	9	0	26	0	2.88
Debbie Hockley	3	0	12	0	4.00

Umpires:

- Aloke Bhattacharjee and S. Choudhary

Key

- * – Captain
- † – Wicket-keeper
- c Fielder – Indicates that the batter was dismissed by a catch by the named fielder
- b Bowler – Indicates which bowler gains credit for the dismissal
- c & b Bowler – Indicates that the batter was dismissed by a catch by the bowler
- lbw – Indicates the batter was dismissed leg before wicket
- st – Indicates the batter was stumped

== Aftermath ==
Hockley was named as player of the match, which was titled "Eve of the Match". She later said that she only won because "in India they tended to just give it to the batsman who score the most runs. It just wouldn't happen now because you're more likely to give it to someone on the winning team". Hockley also finished as the tournament's leading run-scorer, with 456 runs, while Withers took the most wickets, 13. Clark was named as the player of the tournament. Australia and New Zealand met again in the 2000 Women's Cricket World Cup Final, which New Zealand won by four runs.
