= Australia women's cricket team in New Zealand in 1998–99 =

	New Zealand	Australia
- Dates: 19 – 25 February 1999
Captains	Debbie Hockley	Belinda Clark

One Day International series
- Results: New Zealand won the 3-match series 2–1
Most runs	Rebecca Rolls (104)	Belinda Clark (178)
Most wickets	Katrina Keenan (6)	Olivia Magno (8)

The Australia women's national cricket team toured New Zealand in February 1999. They played against New Zealand in three One Day Internationals, which were competed for the Rose Bowl. New Zealand won the series 2–1.

== Squads ==
New Zealand	Australia
Debbie Hockley (c); Catherine Campbell; Emily Drumm; Katrina Keenan; Clare Nicholson; Rachel Pullar; Kathryn Ramel; Rebecca Rolls (wk); Anna Smith; Haidee Tiffen; Helen Watson	Belinda Clark (c); Joanne Broadbent; Avril Fahey; Cathryn Fitzpatrick; Mel Jones; Lisa Keightley; Olivia Magno; Charmaine Mason; Terry McGregor; Julia Price (wk); Karen Rolton; Megan White; Martha Winch

== Tour Match ==
=== 50-over match: Central Districts and Wellington v Australia ===
19 February 1999
Scorecard

Australia; 273/6 (50 overs)	v	Central Districts and Wellington; 164/8 (50 overs)
Karen Rolton 129* (111); Frances King 2/54 (10 overs)		Sara McGlashan 46 (110); Terry McGregor 2/13 (10 overs)

Australia Women won by 109 runs
Victoria Park, Wanganui
Umpires: Peter Garland (NZ) and Ian Shine (NZ)

- Australia Women won the toss and elected to bat.

== WODI Series ==
=== 1st ODI ===
21 February 1999
Scorecard

Australia; 227/5 (50 overs)	v	New Zealand; 228/7 (49.4 overs)
Belinda Clark 95 (117); Kathryn Ramel 1/25 (5 overs)		Rebecca Rolls 60 (48); Olivia Magno 2/35 (10 overs)

New Zealand Women won by 3 wickets
Fitzherbert Park, Palmerston North
Umpires: Bill Sommer (NZ) and Steve Dunne (NZ)

- Australia Women won the toss and elected to bat.
- Megan White (Aus) and Helen Watson (NZ) both made their WODI debuts.

=== 2nd ODI ===
23 February 1999
Scorecard

New Zealand; 204/8 (50 overs)	v	Australia; 181 (48.5 overs)
Debbie Hockley 54 (113); Cathryn Fitzpatrick 2/33 (10 overs)		Karen Rolton 39 (79); Kathryn Ramel 2/12 (4 overs)

New Zealand Women won by 23 runs
Fitzherbert Park, Palmerston North
Umpires: Bill Sommer (NZ) and Steve Dunne (NZ)

- New Zealand Women won the toss and elected to bat.
- Terry McGregor (Aus) made her WODI debut.

=== 3rd ODI ===
25 February 1999
Scorecard

Australia; 192/8 (50 overs)	v	New Zealand; 61 (35.3 overs)
Karen Rolton 59 (68); Katrina Keenan 4/43 (10 overs)		Helen Watson 24 (46); Olivia Magno 4/17 (10 overs)

Australia Women won by 131 runs
Basin Reserve, Wellington
Umpires: Bill Sommer (NZ) and Steve Woodward (NZ)

- Australia Women won the toss and elected to bat.
