= Australia women's cricket team in New Zealand in 1996–97 =

| | New Zealand | Australia |
- Dates: 11 – 23 February 1997
| Captains | Maia Lewis | Belinda Clark |

One Day International series
- Results: Australia won the 5-match series 4–1
| Most runs | Debbie Hockley (272) | Belinda Clark (278) |
| Most wickets | Debbie Hockley (6) | Charmaine Mason (8) |

The Australia women's national cricket team toured New Zealand in February 1997. They played against New Zealand in five One Day Internationals, which were competed for the Rose Bowl. Australia won the series 4–1.

== Squads ==
| New Zealand | Australia |
|---|---|
| Maia Lewis (c); Trudy Anderson; Catherine Campbell; Helen Daly; Emily Drumm; Shelley Fruin; Justine Fryer; Julie Harris; Debbie Hockley; Katrina Keenan; Karen Le Comber; Clare Nicholson; Rebecca Rolls (wk) | Belinda Clark (c); Cherie Bambury; Joanne Broadbent; Bronwyn Calver; Avril Fahey; Cathryn Fitzpatrick; Zoe Goss; Mel Jones; Lisa Keightley; Olivia Magno; Charmaine Mason; Julia Price (wk); Karen Rolton |

== Tour Match ==
=== 50-over match: New Zealand A v Australia ===
11 February 1997
Scorecard

| New Zealand A 120 (39.5 overs) | v | Australia; 121/6 (35.3 overs) |
| Kathryn Ramel 31 (–); Joanne Broadbent 2/6 (5 overs) | | Belinda Clark 59 (–); Clare Nicholson 2/20 (9 overs) |

Australia Women won by 4 wickets
McLean Park, Napier
Umpires: Tony Hill (NZ) and Bob Pitcairn (NZ)

- New Zealand A Women won the toss and elected to bat.

== WODI Series ==
=== 1st ODI ===
13 February 1997 (D/N)
Scorecard

| New Zealand; 227/9 (50 overs) | v | Australia; 205/5 (50 overs) |
| Debbie Hockley 67 (129); Karen Rolton 2/30 (4 overs) | | Karen Rolton 53* (79); Julie Harris 2/47 (10 overs) |

New Zealand Women won by 22 runs
McLean Park, Napier
Umpires: Bill Sutton (NZ) and Tony Hill (NZ)

- New Zealand Women won the toss and elected to bat.

=== 2nd ODI ===
16 February 1997
Scorecard

| Australia; 247/5 (50 overs) | v | New Zealand; 158 (42 overs) |
| Belinda Clark 142 (130); Debbie Hockley 1/29 (7 overs) | | Debbie Hockley 78* (104); Karen Rolton 3/26 (9 overs) |

Australia Women won by 89 runs
Eden Park, Auckland
Umpires: Ian Shine (NZ) and Malcolm Glenny (NZ)

- Australia Women won the toss and elected to bat.

=== 3rd ODI ===
19 February 1997
Scorecard

| Australia; 190/8 (50 overs) | v | New Zealand; 179/8 (50 overs) |
| Karen Rolton 53 (77); Catherine Campbell 2/37 (7 overs) | | Karen Le Comber 48 (77); Olivia Magno 2/27 (10 overs) |

Australia Women won by 11 runs
Lancaster Park, Christchurch
Umpires: Jeremy Busby (NZ) and Peter Williams (NZ)

- Australia Women won the toss and elected to bat.

=== 4th ODI ===
22 February 1997
Scorecard

| New Zealand; 186 (49.2 overs) | v | Australia; 187/4 (48.2 overs) |
| Emily Drumm 88* (143); Cathryn Fitzpatrick 3/39 (10 overs) | | Lisa Keightley 70 (123); Debbie Hockley 3/49 (10 overs) |

Australia Women won by 6 wickets
Basin Reserve, Wellington
Umpires: Evan Watkin (NZ) and Peter Chapman (NZ)

- New Zealand Women won the toss and elected to bat.

=== 5th ODI ===
23 February 1997
Scorecard

| New Zealand; 232/6 (50 overs) | v | Australia; 233/7 (49.4 overs) |
| Debbie Hockley 91 (153); Bronwyn Calver 3/40 (10 overs) | | Karen Rolton 113* (121); Katrina Keenan 2/42 (10 overs) |

Australia Women won by 3 wickets
Basin Reserve, Wellington
Umpires: Bill Sommer (NZ) and Evan Watkin (NZ)

- New Zealand Women won the toss and elected to bat.
