= New Zealand women's cricket team in Australia in 1999–2000 =

	Australia	New Zealand
- Dates: 4 – 9 February 2000
Captains	Belinda Clark	Emily Drumm

One Day International series
- Results: Australia won the 3-match series 3–0
Most runs	Belinda Clark (208)	Debbie Hockley (188)
Most wickets	Avril Fahey (5)	Catherine Campbell (3); Haidee Tiffen (3)
- Player of the series: Belinda Clark (Aus)

The New Zealand women's national cricket team toured Australia in February 2000. They played against Australia in three One Day Internationals, which were to contest the Rose Bowl. Australia won the series 3–0.

== Squads ==
Australia	New Zealand
Belinda Clark (c); Cherie Bambury; Joanne Broadbent; Avril Fahey; Cathryn Fitzpatrick; Lisa Keightley; Olivia Magno; Charmaine Mason; Terry McGregor; Julia Price (wk); Karen Rolton; Clea Smith; Martha Winch	Emily Drumm (c); Catherine Campbell; Paula Gruber; Debbie Hockley; Katrina Keenan; Nicola Payne; Kate Pulford; Rachel Pullar; Kathryn Ramel; Rebecca Rolls (wk); Anna Smith; Haidee Tiffen; Helen Watson

== Tour Match ==
=== 50-over match: Victoria v New Zealand ===
4 February 2000
Scorecard

Victoria; 119/8 (50 overs)	v	New Zealand; 120/8 (43.3 overs)
Mel Jones 26 (–); Haidee Tiffen 3/24 (8 overs)		Nicola Payne 29 (–); Stephanie Theodore 4/19 (10 overs)

New Zealand Women won by 2 wickets
Princes Park, Maryborough
Umpires: Neil Sievers (Aus) and Russell Turner (Aus)

- Victoria Women won the toss and elected to bat.

== WODI Series ==
=== 1st ODI ===
6 February 2000
Scorecard

Australia; 180/9 (50 overs)	v	New Zealand; 167 (49.4 overs)
Belinda Clark 69 (100); Haidee Tiffen 3/24 (9 overs)		Debbie Hockley 100 (159); Olivia Magno 2/22 (10 overs)

Australia Women won by 13 runs
Albert Cricket Ground, Melbourne
Umpires: Bob Stratford (Aus) and Tony Soulsby (Aus)

- Australia Women won the toss and elected to bat.
- Paula Gruber (NZ) made her WODI debut.

=== 2nd ODI ===
8 February 2000
Scorecard

New Zealand; 166/8 (50 overs)	v	Australia; 167/4 (46.2 overs)
Debbie Hockley 66 (108); Avril Fahey 3/27 (10 overs)		Belinda Clark 78 (96); Helen Watson 2/25 (8.2 overs)

Australia Women won by 6 wickets
Albert Cricket Ground, Melbourne
Umpires: Geoff Morrow (Aus) and Stephen Walpole (Aus)

- New Zealand Women won the toss and elected to bat.

=== 3rd ODI ===
9 February 2000
Scorecard

New Zealand; 179/8 (50 overs)	v	Australia; 180/3 (42.1 overs)
Nicola Payne 36 (82); Charmaine Mason 2/43 (10 overs)		Belinda Clark 61 (103); Nicola Payne 1/22 (5 overs)

Australia Women won by 7 wickets
Junction Oval, Melbourne
Umpires: Geoff Morrow (Aus) and Stephen Walpole (Aus)

- New Zealand Women won the toss and elected to bat.
