= England women's cricket team in Australia and New Zealand in 1999–2000 =

English women's cricket team in Australia in 1999–2000
	Australia	England
- Dates: 26 January – 3 February 2000
Captains	Belinda Clark	Karen Smithies

One Day International series
- Results: Australia won the 4-match series 4–0
Most runs	Belinda Clark (283)	Charlotte Edwards (94)
Most wickets	Charmaine Mason (15)	Melissa Reynard (4)

The English women's cricket team toured Australia and New Zealand in January and February 2000. They played Australia women's national cricket team in 4 One Day Internationals and New Zealand in 5 One Day Internationals. They lost both series, losing 4–0 to Australia and 5–0 to New Zealand.

== Tour of Australia ==
=== Squads ===
Australia	England
Belinda Clark (c); Cherie Bambury; Joanne Broadbent; Avril Fahey; Cathryn Fitzpatrick; Lisa Keightley; Olivia Magno; Charmaine Mason; Terry McGregor; Julia Price (wk); Karen Rolton; Clea Smith; Martha Winch	Karen Smithies (c); Clare Connor; Barbara Daniels; Charlotte Edwards; Dawn Holden; Kathryn Leng; Laura Newton; Lucy Pearson; Melissa Reynard; Nicky Shaw; Jane Smit (wk); Claire Taylor; Clare Taylor; Katharine Winks

=== Tour Matches ===
==== 50-over match: New South Wales v England ====
26 January 2000
Scorecard

England; 104 (49.5 overs)	v	New South Wales; 105/5 (34.3 overs)
Laura Newton 25* (85); Bronwyn Calver 2/13 (10 overs)		Lisa Keightley 39 (66); Dawn Holden 4/31 (10 overs)

New South Wales Women won by 5 wickets
Old King's Oval, Sydney
Umpires: Col Leyden (Aus) and Paul Nicholas (Aus)

- New South Wales Women won the toss and elected to field.

==== 50-over match: New South Wales Second XI v England ====
27 January 2000
Scorecard

New South Wales Second XI; 165/8 (45 overs)	v	England; 157/6 (45 overs)
Amanda Owens 47 (55); Clare Connor 1/15 (6 overs)		Charlotte Edwards 55 (86); Angela O'Neil 2/23 (9 overs)

New South Wales Second XI Women won by 8 runs
Bankstown Oval, Sydney
Umpires: Greg Lill (Aus) and Nick Fowler (Aus)

- England Women won the toss and elected to field.
- Match reduced to 45 overs per side due to rain.

=== WODI Series ===
==== 1st ODI ====
29 January 2000
Scorecard

Australia; 241/7 (50 overs)	v	England; 155/7 (50 overs)
Lisa Keightley 127* (152); Melissa Reynard 2/41 (7 overs)		Charlotte Edwards 55 (95); Clea Smith 1/15 (7 overs)

Australia Women won by 86 runs
Sydney Cricket Ground, Sydney
Umpires: John Evans (Aus) and P Reeves (Aus)
Player of the match: Lisa Keightley (Aus)

- Australia Women won the toss and elected to bat.
- Clea Smith (Aus) made her WODI debut.

==== 2nd ODI ====
30 January 2000
Scorecard

Australia; 249/6 (50 overs)	v	England; 162 (49.4 overs)
Cherie Bambury 66 (96); Kathryn Leng 2/29 (7 overs)		Charlotte Edwards 29 (37); Charmaine Mason 5/30 (9.4 overs)

Australia Women won by 87 runs
Sydney Cricket Ground, Sydney
Umpires: Ron Furtner (Aus) and Tim Donahoo (Aus)
Player of the match: Cherie Bambury (Aus)

- Australia Women won the toss and elected to bat.

==== 3rd ODI ====
1 February 2000
Scorecard

England; 106 (45.5 overs)	v	Australia; 108/0 (24.5 overs)
Kathryn Leng 24 (86); Charmaine Mason 4/27 (7.5 overs)		Belinda Clark 66* (79)

Australia Women won by 10 wickets
Bradman Oval, Bowral
Umpires: John Evans (Aus) and KJ Pye (Aus)
Player of the match: Belinda Clark (Aus)

- Australia Women won the toss and elected to field.

==== 4th ODI ====
3 February 2000
Scorecard

Australia; 299/2 (50 overs)	v	England; 79 (40 overs)
Belinda Clark 146* (151); Clare Taylor 1/41 (10 overs)		Laura Newton 22 (48); Charmaine Mason 5/9 (6 overs)

Australia Women won by 220 runs
Newcastle Number 1 Sports Ground, Newcastle
Umpires: C Stone (Aus) and GE Teasdale (Aus)
Player of the match: Belinda Clark (Aus)

- Australia Women won the toss and elected to bat.

== Tour of New Zealand ==
English women's cricket team in New Zealand in 1999–2000
	New Zealand	England
- Dates: 8 – 22 February 2000
Captains	Emily Drumm	Clare Connor

One Day International series
- Results: New Zealand won the 5-match series 5–0
Most runs	Emily Drumm (171)	Charlotte Edwards (120)
Most wickets	Rachel Pullar (12)	Lucy Pearson (7)

=== Squads ===
New Zealand	England
Emily Drumm (c); Kathryn Ramel; Debbie Hockley; Haidee Tiffen; Rebecca Rolls (wk); Nicola Payne; Paula Flannery; Kate Pulford; Rachel Pullar; Helen Watson; Catherine Campbell; Paula Gruber; Katrina Keenan; Munokoa Tunupopo	Clare Connor (c); Barbara Daniels; Charlotte Edwards; Dawn Holden; Kathryn Leng; Laura Newton; Lucy Pearson; Melissa Reynard; Nicky Shaw; Jane Smit (wk); Karen Smithies; Claire Taylor; Clare Taylor; Katharine Winks

=== Tour Matches ===
==== 50-over match: Wellington v England ====
8 February 2000
Scorecard

England; 196/8 (50 overs)	v	Wellington; 185/8 (50 overs)
Claire Taylor 83 (114); Fiona Stickney 3/38 (10 overs)		Losi Harford 56 (114); Dawn Holden 2/28 (10 overs)

England Women won by 11 runs
Basin Reserve, Wellington
Umpires: Kathy Cross (NZ) and Leonie Brownlee (NZ)

- Wellington Women won the toss and elected to field.

=== WODI Series ===
==== 1st ODI ====
12 February 2000
Scorecard

England; 157/9 (50 overs)	v	New Zealand; 161/3 (45.1 overs)
Charlotte Edwards 37 (78); Katrina Keenan 3/34 (10 overs)		Emily Drumm 45 (64); Lucy Pearson 1/26 (10 overs)

New Zealand Women won by 7 wickets
Fitzherbert Park, Palmerston North
Umpires: Evan Watkin (NZ) and Reg Alexander (NZ)

- New Zealand Women won the toss and elected to field.

==== 2nd ODI ====
15 February 2000
Scorecard

England; 141 (47 overs)	v	New Zealand; 142/2 (40.2 overs)
Claire Taylor 56 (114); Katrina Keenan 3/15 (9 overs)		Debbie Hockley 64* (125); Lucy Pearson 1/24 (7.2 overs)

New Zealand Women won by 8 wickets
Wellington Regional Stadium, Wellington
Umpires: Evan Watkin (NZ) and Steve Dunne (NZ)

- New Zealand Women won the toss and elected to field.

==== 3rd ODI ====
17 February 2000
Scorecard

England; 146/8 (50 overs)	v	New Zealand; 147/6 (46.2 overs)
Claire Taylor 29 (59); Catherine Campbell 2/25 (10 overs)		Emily Drumm 59 (93); Lucy Pearson 2/20 (10 overs)

New Zealand Women won by 4 wickets
Eden Park, Auckland
Umpires: Billy Bowden (NZ) and Tony Hill (NZ)

- England Women won the toss and elected to bat.
- Munokoa Tunupopo (NZ) made her WODI debut.

==== 4th ODI ====
20 February 2000
Scorecard

England; 117 (48.5 overs)	v	New Zealand; 118/5 (33.3 overs)
Jane Smit 39* (107); Rachel Pullar 3/15 (10 overs)		Haidee Tiffen 32* (92); Lucy Pearson 2/26 (10 overs)

New Zealand Women won by 5 wickets
Seddon Park, Hamilton
Umpires: Ian Shine (NZ) and Malcolm MacLean (NZ)

- England Women won the toss and elected to bat.

==== 5th ODI ====
22 February 2000
Scorecard

England; 86 (37.2 overs)	v	New Zealand; 63/4 (25.4 overs)
Charlotte Edwards 25 (61); Rachel Pullar 4/11 (8 overs)		Emily Drumm 20 (41); Melissa Reynard 2/4 (6 overs)

New Zealand Women won by 6 wickets (D/L)
McLean Park, Napier
Umpires: Barry Frost (NZ) and Robert Anderson (NZ)

- New Zealand Women won the toss and elected to field.
- Paula Flannery (NZ) made her WODI debut.
