= Australia women's cricket team in England and Ireland in 1998 =

Australian women's cricket team in England in 1998
	England	Australia
- Dates: 5 July – 24 August 1998
Captains	Karen Smithies	Belinda Clark

Test series
- Result: 3-match series drawn 0–0
Most runs	Jan Brittin (450)	Karen Rolton (327)
Most wickets	Karen Smithies (5)	Cathryn Fitzpatrick (13)

One Day International series
- Results: Australia won the 5-match series 5–0
Most runs	Karen Smithies (167)	Lisa Keightley (255)
Most wickets	Melissa Reynard (3); Karen Smithies (3)	Cathryn Fitzpatrick (9)

The Australian women's cricket team toured England and Ireland in July and August 1998. The matches against England women's cricket team were played for the Women's Ashes, which Australia were defending. Australia won the ODI series 5–0, whilst all three Test matches were drawn, meaning that Australia retained the Ashes. During their tour of England, Australia played three ODIs against Ireland, winning the series 3–0.

== Tour of England ==
=== Squads ===
England	Australia
Karen Smithies (c); Jan Brittin; Jane Cassar (wk); Sarah Collyer; Clare Connor; Barbara Daniels; Charlotte Edwards; Kathryn Leng; Sue Metcalfe; Lucy Pearson; Sue Redfern; Melissa Reynard; Clare Taylor; Claire Taylor; Katharine Winks	Belinda Clark (c); Joanne Broadbent; Bronwyn Calver; Jodi Dannatt; Avril Fahey; Cathryn Fitzpatrick; Jane Franklin; Michelle Goszko; Mel Jones; Lisa Keightley; Olivia Magno; Charmaine Mason; Julia Price (wk); Karen Rolton

=== Tour matches ===
==== 50-over match: England Under-21s v Australia ====
5 July 1998
Scorecard

Australia; 266/4 (50 overs)	v	England Under-21s; 99/7 (50 overs)
Belinda Clark 91 (96); Katharine Winks 2/57 (10 overs)		Charlotte Edwards 26 (61); Avril Fahey 2/6 (8 overs)

Australia Women won by 167 runs
Arden Field, Finchley
Umpires: David Bryant (Eng) and Valerie Gibbens (Eng)

- England Under-21s Women won the toss and elected to bat.

==== 50-over match: South of England v Australia ====
7 July 1998
Scorecard

Australia; 243/5 (50 overs)	v	South of England; 141/5 (50 overs)
Karen Rolton 119 (111); Jackie Hawker 3/41 (10 overs)		Ruth Lupton 69 (154); Charmaine Mason 2/18 (10 overs)

Australia Women won by 102 runs
Denis Compton Oval, Shenley
Umpires: Janet Rogers (Eng) and Kathy Taylor (Eng)

- Australia Women won the toss and elected to bat.

==== 50-over match: North of England v Australia ====
9 July 1998
Scorecard

Australia; 285/6 (50 overs)	v	North of England; 98/8 (50 overs)
Lisa Keightley 82* (94); Lucy McGrother 3/32 (10 overs)		Sue Redfern 33* (71); Avril Fahey 3/23 (10 overs)

Australia Women won by 187 runs
Townfield Lane, Oxton
Umpires: J Pratt (Eng) and Benita White (Eng)

- North of England Women won the toss and elected to field.

==== 3-day match: England A v Australia ====
31 July–2 August 1998
Scorecard

England A	v	Australia
74 (54 overs); Yvonne Craven 13 (21); Olivia Magno 5/15 (12 overs)		596 (157.1 overs); Karen Rolton 193 (227); Kelly Evenson 3/117 (41 overs)
95 (65.2 overs); Katharine Winks 28 (76); Bronwyn Calver 4/13 (16 overs)

Australia Women won by an innings and 427 runs
The Grove, Sittingbourne
Umpires: David Bryant (Eng) and Kathy Taylor (Eng)

- England A Women won the toss and elected to bat.

==== 3-day match: Women's Cricket Association President's XI v Australia ====
18–20 August 1998
Scorecard

Australia	v	Women's Cricket Association President's XI
286/4d (69 overs); Karen Rolton 144 (162); Arran Thompson 2/46 (13 overs)		128 (79.3 overs); Mandie Godliman 36 (186); Karen Rolton 2/7 (9 overs)
		121/6 (59 overs) (f/o); Debra Stock 34* (55); Michelle Goszko 2/22 (8 overs)

Match drawn
Hare Hill, Littleborough
Umpires: Sally Marshall (Eng) and Benita White (Eng)

- Women's Cricket Association President's XI won the toss and elected to field.

=== WODI Series ===
==== 1st ODI ====
12 July 1998
Scorecard

Australia; 166/5 (29 overs)	v	England; 104/7 (20 overs)
Belinda Clark 95* (96); Karen Smithies 1/32 (6 overs)		Karen Smithies 41 (38); Cathryn Fitzpatrick 2/27 (6 overs)

Australia Women won by 11 runs (D/L)
North Marine Road Ground, Scarborough
Umpires: Alan Heath (Eng) and Sally Marshall (Eng)
Player of the match: Belinda Clark (Aus)

- Australia Women won the toss and elected to bat.
- Australia Women innings reduced to 29 overs due to rain.
- England Women target was 115 runs in 20 overs due to rain.
- Sarah Collyer (Eng) made her WODI debut.

==== 2nd ODI ====
15 July 1998
Scorecard

Australia; 204/6 (50 overs)	v	England; 140 (47.2 overs)
Lisa Keightley 59 (101); Clare Taylor 1/20 (10 overs)		Karen Smithies 44 (71); Charmaine Mason 4/24 (9.2 overs)

Australia Women won by 64 runs
County Ground, Derby
Umpires: Ann Roberts (Eng) and John Hayes (Eng)
Player of the match: Karen Smithies (Eng)

- England Women won the toss and elected to field.
- Lucy Pearson (Eng) made her WODI debut.

==== 3rd ODI ====
18 July 1998
Scorecard

Australia; 237/4 (50 overs)	v	England; 202/9 (50 overs)
Joanne Broadbent 70 (124); Clare Taylor 1/24 (10 overs)		Charlotte Edwards 75 (119); Olivia Magno 3/46 (10 overs)

Australia Women won by 35 runs
County Ground, Hove
Umpires: Ann Garton (Eng) and Dave Fardell (Eng)
Player of the match: Charlotte Edwards (Eng)

- Australia Women won the toss and elected to bat.
- Katharine Winks (Eng) made her WODI debut.

==== 4th ODI ====
19 July 1998
Scorecard

England; 102 (49.2 overs)	v	Australia; 106/2 (24.5 overs)
Clare Connor 20 (42); Bronwyn Calver 1/13 (10 overs)		Lisa Keightley 56* (82); Karen Smithies 1/32 (6.5 overs)

Australia Women won by 8 wickets
County Ground, Southampton
Umpires: Alan Fox (Eng) and Kathy Taylor (Eng)

- England Women won the toss and elected to bat.
- Claire Taylor (Eng) and Jane Franklin (Aus) made their WODI debuts.

==== 5th ODI ====
21 July 1998
Scorecard

Australia; 256/1 (50 overs)	v	England; 142/7 (50 overs)
Lisa Keightley 113* (143); Melissa Reynard 1/28 (5 overs)		Karen Smithies 62* (98); Cathryn Fitzpatrick 5/47 (10 overs)

Australia Women won by 114 runs
Lord's, London
Umpires: John West (Eng) and Lorraine Elgar (Eng)
Player of the match: Lisa Keightley (Aus)

- Australia Women won the toss and elected to bat.

=== Test series ===
==== 1st Test ====
6 – 9 August 1998
Scorecard

England	v	Australia
414 (189 overs); Jan Brittin 146 (490); Olivia Magno 5/87 (43 overs)		569/6d (180 overs); Joanne Broadbent 200 (476); Charlotte Edwards 2/79 (27 overs)
160/1 (62 overs); Charlotte Edwards 77 (160); Cathryn Fitzpatrick 1/20 (12 overs)

Match drawn
Woodbridge Road, Guildford
Umpires: Lorraine Elgar (Eng) and John West (Eng)
Player of the match: Charlotte Edwards (Eng)

- England Women won the toss and elected to bat.
- Sarah Collyer (Eng), Bronwyn Calver and Mel Jones (Aus) all made their WTest debuts.

==== 2nd Test ====
11 – 14 August 1998
Scorecard

Australia	v	England
306/3d (92.3 overs); Karen Rolton 82 (113); Charlotte Edwards 2/28 (11 overs)		326/8d (139 overs); Jan Brittin 167 (402); Cathryn Fitzpatrick 4/91 (43 overs)
303/5d (104 overs); Lisa Keightley 90 (191); Karen Smithies 2/32 (14 overs)		64/0 (15.4 overs); Charlotte Edwards 42* (52)

Match drawn
St George's Road Cricket Ground, Harrogate
Umpires: Alan Heath (Eng) and Ann Roberts (Eng)

- Australia Women won the toss and elected to bat.

==== 3rd Test ====
21 – 24 August 1998
Scorecard

England	v	Australia
243 (135.4 overs); Jan Brittin 72 (318); Cathryn Fitzpatrick 4/100 (40 overs)		427/4d (103.2 overs); Karen Rolton 176* (236); Karen Smithies 2/83 (27 overs)
190/6 (74 overs); Charlotte Edwards 87 (154); Cathryn Fitzpatrick 3/58 (27 overs)

Match drawn
New Road, Worcester
Umpires: Alan Fox (Eng) and John West (Eng)

- England Women won the toss and elected to bat.
- Jane Franklin (Aus) made her WTest debut.

== Tour of Ireland ==
Australian women's cricket team in Ireland in 2001
	Ireland	Australia
- Dates: 24 – 27 July 1998
Captains	Miriam Grealey	Belinda Clark

One Day International series
- Results: Australia won the 3-match series 3–0
Most runs	Miriam Grealey (65)	Joanne Broadbent (115)
Most wickets	Clare Shillington (8)	Olivia Magno (4); Joanne Broadbent (4); Jodi Dannatt (4)

=== Squads ===
Ireland	Australia
Miriam Grealey (c); Caitriona Beggs; Anne Linehan (wk); Barbara McDonald; Clare O'Leary; Davina Pratt; Cliodhna Sharp; Clare Shillington; Tracey Skoyles; Nikki Squire; Heather Whelan; Saibh Young	Belinda Clark (c); Joanne Broadbent; Bronwyn Calver; Jodi Dannatt; Avril Fahey; Cathryn Fitzpatrick; Jane Franklin; Michelle Goszko; Mel Jones; Lisa Keightley; Olivia Magno; Charmaine Mason; Julia Price (wk); Karen Rolton

=== WODI Series ===
==== 1st ODI ====
24 July 1998
Scorecard

Australia; 261/4 (50 overs)	v	Ireland; 89 (44.3 overs)
Joanne Broadbent 82* (70); Clare Shillington 3/34 (10 overs)		Caitriona Beggs 26 (47); Olivia Magno 3/9 (8.3 overs)

Australia Women won by 172 runs
College Park, Dublin
Umpires: Alan Tuffery (Ire) and Sid Moore (Ire)

- Ireland Women won the toss and elected to field.

==== 2nd ODI ====
25 July 1998
Scorecard

Australia; 267/5 (50 overs)	v	Ireland; 97/8 (50 overs)
Karen Rolton 73 (70); Clare Shillington 2/61 (10 overs)		Miriam Grealey 38 (77); Joanne Broadbent 2/10 (5 overs)

Australia Women won by 170 runs
College Park, Dublin
Umpires: Alan Tuffery (Ire) and Sid Moore (Ire)

- Australia Women won the toss and elected to bat.

==== 3rd ODI ====
27 July 1998
Scorecard

Australia; 190/8 (46 overs)	v	Ireland; 90 (41.1 overs)
Jodi Dannatt 43 (80); Clare Shillington 2/61 (10 overs)		Miriam Grealey 27 (86); Jodi Dannatt 2/11 (3 overs)

Australia Women won by 96 runs (D/L)
Merrion Cricket Club Ground, Dublin
Umpires: Brian Carpenter (Ire) and Sid Moore (Ire)

- Australia Women won the toss and elected to bat.
- Australia Women innings reduced to 46 overs due to rain.
- Ireland Women target of 186 runs in 42 overs due to rain.
