= 2000 Women's Cricket World Cup final =

Cricket match

2000 Women's Cricket World Cup Final
- Event: 2000 Women's Cricket World Cup
New Zealand	Australia
(New Zealand)	(Australia)
184	180
48.4 overs	49.1 overs
- New Zealand won by 4 runs
- Date: 23 December 2000
- Venue: Bert Sutcliffe Oval, Lincoln, New Zealand
- Player of the match: Belinda Clark (Aus)
- Umpires: Peter Parker (Aus) and Dave Quested (NZ)

The 2000 Women's Cricket World Cup Final was a women's One Day International cricket match between New Zealand and Australia played on 23 December 2000 at the Bert Sutcliffe Oval in Lincoln, New Zealand. It was the culmination of the 2000 Women's Cricket World Cup, the seventh Women's Cricket World Cup. New Zealand won by 4 runs, clinching their first World Cup title, after finishing as runners-up in both the 1993 and 1997 tournaments, to England and Australia, respectively. Rick Eyre of ESPNcricinfo suggested that it was "the greatest World Cup final ever."

Australia and New Zealand finished first and second in the round-robin group stage of the tournament, and then won their respective semi-finals against South Africa and India to meet in the final for the second consecutive tournament.

New Zealand won the toss and elected to bat first, but according to Eyre, they "crumbled to be all out" for 184 runs. Kathryn Ramel scored the most runs for New Zealand, accruing 41 from 63 deliveries, while Terry McGregor bowled particularly economically for Australia. In their response, Australia lost the early wickets of Lisa Keightley and Karen Rolton, but Belinda Clark remained at the crease, and scored 91 runs before being bowled in the 42nd over. Australia kept losing wickets, and from the first ball of the final over, requiring five more runs to win, Charmaine Mason was caught behind, leaving Australia all out for 180. Katrina Keenan, Clare Nicholson and Rachel Pullar took two wickets apiece for New Zealand, with Keenan in particular restricting the run-rate effectively. Clark's batting, which accounted for three fifths of the runs scored while she was at the crease, led her to be presented with the player of the match award.

== Match ==
23 December 2000
scorecard

New Zealand; 184 (48.4 overs)	v	Australia; 180 (49.1 overs)
Kathryn Ramel (41); Cathryn Fitzpatrick (3/52)		Belinda Clark (91); Katrina Keenan (2/19)

New Zealand Women won by 4 runs
Bert Sutcliffe Oval, Lincoln
Umpires: Peter Parker (Aus) and Dave Quested (NZ)
Player of the match: Belinda Clark (Aus)
