= Dave Quested =

New Zealand cricket umpire (1946–2024)

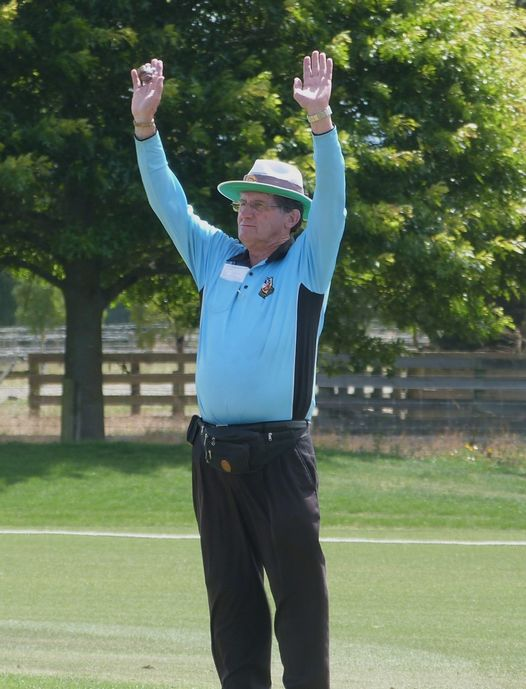
- Quested umpiring in his last match in 2023

Personal information
- Full name: David Murray Quested
- Born: 16 April 1946; Christchurch, New Zealand
- Died: 6 August 2024 (aged 78); Christchurch, New Zealand

Umpiring information
- Tests umpired: 5 (1995–2001)
- ODIs umpired: 31 (1992–2002)
- WODIs umpired: 18 (1990–2009)
- Source: Cricinfo, 15 July 2013

David Murray Quested (16 April 1946 – 6 August 2024) was a New Zealand cricket umpire. He stood in five Test matches between 1995 and 2001 and 31 One Day International games between 1992 and 2002. He also umpired the final of the 2000 Women's Cricket World Cup, when New Zealand defeated Australia by four runs at Bert Sutcliffe Oval.

Quested was born in Christchurch and educated at Linwood High School. He umpired 116 first-class matches between December 1990 and March 2010. His main work was as a police detective. He served with the New Zealand Police for 32 years, mainly in the Criminal Investigation Branch in Christchurch, before retiring in 2001.

In retirement, Quested served the Social Workers Registration Board as a professional conduct committee member.

Quested died in Christchurch Hospital on 6 August 2024, at the age of 78. He and his wife Jan had a son and two daughters.
