= 2000 Women's Cricket World Cup =

2000 Women's World Cup
- Dates: 29 November – 23 December 2000
- Administrator: International Women's Cricket Council
- Cricket format: Women's One Day International (50 overs)
- Tournament format(s): Round-robin and knockout
- Host: New Zealand
- Champions: New Zealand (1st title)
- Runners-up: Australia
- Participants: 8
- Matches: 31
- Most runs: (Australia) Karen Rolton (393)
- Most wickets: (Australia) Charmaine Mason (17)

The 2000 Women's Cricket World Cup, also known as 2000 CricInfo Women's Cricket World Cup, was an international cricket tournament played in New Zealand from 29 November to 23 December 2000. It was the seventh edition of the Women's Cricket World Cup, and the second to be hosted by New Zealand, after the 1982 tournament.

The World Cup was organised by the International Women's Cricket Council (IWCC), with matches played over 50 overs. New Zealand defeated the defending champions Australia by four runs in the final, winning their first and only title. India and South Africa were the losing semi-finalists, while the other four teams were England, Sri Lanka, Ireland, and the Netherlands. Two Australians, Karen Rolton and Charmaine Mason, led the tournament in runs and wickets, respectively, while another Australian, Lisa Keightley, was named player of the tournament. The tournament was sponsored by CricInfo, a cricket website, which offered live text commentary, and streamed audio and video, a first for women's cricket.

== Round-robin ==
=== Points table ===
Team	Pld	W	L	T	NR	NRR	Pts
Australia	7	7	0	0	0	+1.984	14
New Zealand	7	6	1	0	0	+2.008	12
India	7	5	2	0	0	+0.711	10
South Africa	7	4	3	0	0	–0.403	8
England	7	3	4	0	0	+0.440	6
Sri Lanka	7	2	5	0	0	–1.572	4
Ireland	7	1	6	0	0	–0.983	2
Netherlands	7	0	7	0	0	–2.098	0

=== Matches ===
29 November 2000
Scorecard

New Zealand; 166/9 (50 overs)	v	Australia; 167/4 (47.3 overs)

Australia won by 6 wickets
Bert Sutcliffe Oval, Lincoln

30 November 2000
Scorecard

England; 256/3 (50 overs)	v	Netherlands; 116/9 (50 overs)

England won by 140 runs
Bert Sutcliffe Oval, Lincoln

30 November 2000
Scorecard

South Africa; 128/8 (50 overs)	v	India; 129/2 (39.4 overs)

India won by 8 wickets
Hagley Oval, Christchurch

1 December 2000
Scorecard

Australia; 282/3 (50 overs)	v	Sri Lanka; 82 (39 overs)

Australia won by 200 runs
Hagley Oval, Christchurch

1 December 2000
Scorecard

Ireland; 99 (47.4 overs)	v	New Zealand; 102/2 (24.5 overs)

New Zealand won by 8 wickets
Bert Sutcliffe Oval, Lincoln

2 December 2000
Scorecard

England; 143 (47.5 overs)	v	South Africa; 144/5 (46.5 overs)

South Africa won by 5 wickets
Bert Sutcliffe Oval, Lincoln

2 December 2000
Scorecard

India; 275/4 (50 overs)	v	Netherlands; 121/6 (50 overs)

India won by 154 runs
Lincoln Green, Lincoln

3 December 2000
Scorecard

Ireland; 90 (49.3 overs)	v	Australia; 91/0 (20.3 overs)

Australia won by 10 wickets
Hagley Park No. 2, Christchurch

3 December 2000
Scorecard

New Zealand; 210/4 (50 overs)	v	Sri Lanka; 88 (49.3 overs)

New Zealand won by 122 runs
Lincoln Green, Lincoln

4 December 2000
Scorecard

India; 155/7 (50 overs)	v	England; 147 (49.2 overs)

India won by 8 runs
Lincoln Green, Lincoln

4 December 2000
Scorecard

Netherlands; 92 (37.1 overs)	v	South Africa; 93/6 (26.2 overs)

South Africa won by 4 wickets
Hagley Park No. 2, Christchurch

5 December 2000
Scorecard

Sri Lanka; 129 (47.3 overs)	v	Ireland; 119 (49.5 overs)

Sri Lanka won by 10 runs
Lincoln Green, Lincoln

6 December 2000
Scorecard

Australia; 223/5 (50 overs)	v	India; 172/8 (50 overs)

Australia won by 51 runs
Bert Sutcliffe Oval, Lincoln

6 December 2000
Scorecard

Netherlands; 80 (48 overs)	v	New Zealand; 81/2 (16.3 overs)

New Zealand won by 8 wickets
Hagley Park No. 2, Christchurch

7 December 2000
Scorecard

Ireland; 103 (44.2 overs)	v	England; 105/2 (29.3 overs)

England won by 8 wickets
Bert Sutcliffe Oval, Lincoln

8 December 2000
Scorecard

Sri Lanka; 134/9 (50 overs)	v	South Africa; 135/4 (45.3 overs)

South Africa won by 6 wickets
Lincoln Green, Lincoln

9 December 2000
Scorecard

New Zealand; 224/5 (50 overs)	v	India; 150/7 (50 overs)

New Zealand won by 74 runs
Bert Sutcliffe Oval, Lincoln

10 December 2000
Scorecard

Australia; 190/7 (50 overs)	v	England; 136 (47.3 overs)

Australia won by 54 runs
Lincoln Green, Lincoln

10 December 2000
Scorecard

Sri Lanka; 139 (47.1 overs)	v	Netherlands; 113 (39.4 overs)

Sri Lanka won by 26 runs
Hagley Park No. 2, Christchurch

11 December 2000
Scorecard

India; 199/9 (50 overs)	v	Ireland; 169 (47.2 overs)

India won by 30 runs
Hagley Park No. 2, Christchurch

11 December 2000
Scorecard

New Zealand; 265/5 (50 overs)	v	South Africa; 107 (35.4 overs)

New Zealand won by 158 runs
Bert Sutcliffe Oval, Lincoln

12 December 2000
Scorecard

England; 242/4 (50 overs)	v	Sri Lanka; 137/9 (50 overs)

England won by 105 runs
Bert Sutcliffe Oval, Lincoln

13 December 2000
Scorecard

South Africa; 169/8 (50 overs)	v	Australia; 171/1 (25 overs)

Australia won by 9 wickets
Bert Sutcliffe Oval, Lincoln

14 December 2000
Scorecard

Ireland; 232/6 (50 overs)	v	Netherlands; 191/8 (50 overs)

Ireland won by 41 runs
Hagley Park No. 2, Christchurch

14 December 2000
Scorecard

New Zealand; 238/8 (50 overs)	v	England; 145 (47.3 overs)

New Zealand won by 93 runs
Bert Sutcliffe Oval, Lincoln

15 December 2000
Scorecard

India; 230/4 (50 overs)	v	Sri Lanka; 89 (49.2 overs)

India won by 141 runs
Lincoln Green, Lincoln

16 December 2000
Scorecard

Netherlands; 107/7 (50 overs)	v	Australia; 109/0 (24 overs)

Australia won by 10 wickets
Lincoln Green, Lincoln

16 December 2000
Scorecard

Ireland; 176/9 (50 overs)	v	South Africa; 177/1 (36.2 overs)

South Africa won by 9 wickets
Hagley Park No. 2, Christchurch

== Knockout stage ==
=== Semi finals ===
18 December 2000
scorecard

South Africa; 180/8 (50.0 overs)	v	Australia; 181/1 (31.2 overs)
Linda Olivier 41 (101); Charmaine Mason 3/39 (10 overs)		Lisa Keightley 91* (97); Cindy Eksteen 1/39 (9 overs)

Australia won by 9 wickets
Bert Sutcliffe Oval, Lincoln
Umpires: Billy Bowden and Steve Dunne
Player of the match: Lisa Keightley (Aus)

20 December 2000
scorecard

India; 117 (45.2 overs)	v	New Zealand; 121/1 (26.5 overs)
Purnima Rau 67 (133); Kathryn Ramel 2/12 (5 overs)		Anna Smith 50* (90); Neetu David 1/18 (5 overs)

New Zealand won by 9 wickets
Bert Sutcliffe Oval, Lincoln
Umpires: Kathy Cross and Brian Jerling
Player of the match: Anna Smith (NZ)

=== Final ===
23 December 2000
scorecard

New Zealand; 184 (48.4 overs)	v	Australia; 180 (49.1 overs)
Kathryn Ramel 41 (63); Cathryn Fitzpatrick 3/52 (9.4 overs)		Belinda Clark 91 (102); Katrina Keenan 2/19 (10 overs)

New Zealand won by 4 runs
Bert Sutcliffe Oval, Lincoln
Umpires: Peter Parker and Dave Quested
Player of the match: Belinda Clark (Aus)

== Statistics ==
=== Most runs ===
The top five run-scorers are included in this table, ranked by runs scored, then by batting average, then alphabetically by surname.

Player	Team	Runs	Inns	Avg	Highest	100s	50s
Karen Rolton	Australia	393	7	131.00	154*	2	2
Lisa Keightley	Australia	375	8	75.00	91*	0	4
Belinda Clark	Australia	351	9	58.50	91	0	2
Emily Drumm	New Zealand	339	7	67.80	108*	1	2
Anna Smith	New Zealand	308	8	51.33	91*	0	3

Source: ESPNcricinfo

=== Most wickets ===
The top five wicket-takers are listed in this table, ranked by wickets taken and then by bowling average.

Player	Team	Overs	Wkts	Ave	SR	Econ	BBI
Charmaine Mason	Australia	69.3	17	10.76	24.5	2.63	3/20
Clare Taylor	England	64.0	14	10.85	27.4	2.37	4/25
Avril Fahey	Australia	45.0	13	11.76	20.7	3.40	3/11
Katrina Keenan	New Zealand	69.0	12	10.66	10.66	1.85	3/16
Cathryn Fitzpatrick	Australia	84.4	11	26.09	46.1	3.38	3/22

Source: ESPNcricinfo
