= Aloke Bhattacharjee =

Indian cricketer and umpire (1953–2016)

Personal information
- Born: 24 August 1953; Howrah, West Bengal, India
- Died: 24 December 2016 (aged 63); Kolkata, India
- Batting: Right-handed
- Bowling: Right-arm leg-spin, off-spin

Domestic team information
- Years: Team
- 1970–71 to 1986–87: Bengal
- 1975–76 to 1979–80: East Zone

Umpiring information
- ODIs umpired: 3 (1998–2002)
- WODIs umpired: 2 (1997–2004)

Career statistics
| Competition | FC | List A |
|---|---|---|
| Matches | 42 | 8 |
| Runs scored | 575 | 69 |
| Batting average | 15.54 | 17.25 |
| 100s/50s | 0/1 | 0/0 |
| Top score | 55 | 18 not out |
| Balls bowled | 6887 | 495 |
| Wickets | 134 | 1 |
| Bowling average | 22.67 | 323.00 |
| 5 wickets in innings | 4 | 0 |
| 10 wickets in match | 1 | n/a |
| Best bowling | 7/7 | 1/30 |
| Catches/stumpings | 15/– | 0/– |
- Source: ESPNcricinfo, 25 January 2015

Aloke Bhattacharjee (24 August 1953 – 24 December 2016) was an Indian cricketer and umpire. Besides officiating at the first-class level, he stood in three One Day International (ODI) matches from 1998 to 2002.

He played first-class cricket as a spin bowler for Bengal from 1971 to 1987, and represented East Zone several times. His best bowling figures of 7 for 7 came in the second innings against Assam in 1974–75, for match figures of 12.2–6–11–10.

== See also ==
- List of One Day International cricket umpires
