= Kelly Brown (cricketer) =

New Zealand cricketer (born 1973)

Personal information
- Full name: Kelly Dianne Brown
- Born: 8 July 1973 (age 53); Hamilton, New Zealand
- Batting: Right-handed
- Bowling: Right-arm medium
- Role: All-rounder

International information
- National side: New Zealand (1996–1997)
- Test debut (cap 110): 24 June 1996 v England
- Last Test: 12 July 1996 v England
- ODI debut (cap 66): 13 June 1996 v England
- Last ODI: 29 December 1997 v Australia

Domestic team information
- Years: Team
- 1992/93–2010/11: Auckland

Career statistics
Competition	WTest	WODI	WFC	WLA
Matches	3	14	12	67
Runs scored	52	19	196	545
Batting average	–	6.33	24.50	18.79
100s/50s	0/1	0/0	0/1	0/1
Top score	50*	9*	50*	66
Balls bowled	438	520	1,980	1,151
Wickets	7	10	33	36
Bowling average	22.85	25.20	19.87	22.30
5 wickets in innings	0	0	1	0
10 wickets in match	0	0	0	0
Best bowling	3/47	2/8	5/73	3/4
Catches/stumpings	4/–	4/–	17/–	18/–
- Source: CricketArchive, 20 April 2021

Kelly Dianne Brown (born 8 July 1973) is a New Zealand former cricketer who played as a right-arm medium bowler and right-handed batter. She appeared in 3 Test matches and 14 One Day Internationals for New Zealand between 1996 and 1997. Her final WODI appearance was in the final of the 1997 Women's Cricket World Cup. She played domestic cricket for Auckland.
