= Belinda Clark =

Australian cricketer (born 1970)

Belinda Clark AO

Personal information
- Full name: Belinda Jane Clark
- Born: 10 September 1970 (age 56); Newcastle, New South Wales, Australia
- Batting: Right-handed
- Bowling: Right-arm off break
- Role: Batter

International information
- National side: Australia (1991–2005)
- Test debut (cap 119): 26 January 1991 v India
- Last Test: 24 August 2005 v England
- ODI debut (cap 66): 17 January 1991 v New Zealand
- Last ODI: 1 September 2005 v England
- Only T20I (cap 3): 2 September 2005 v England

Domestic team information
- Years: Team
- 1990/91–2000/01: New South Wales
- 2001/02–2004/05: Victoria

Career statistics
Competition	WTest	WODI	WT20I	WLA
Matches	15	118	1	244
Runs scored	919	4844	4	10,340
Batting average	45.95	47.49	4.00	49.47
100s/50s	2/6	5/30	0/0	14/74
Top score	136	229*	4	229*
Balls bowled	78	90	–	648
Wickets	1	3	–	18
Bowling average	28.00	17.00	–	21.33
5 wickets in innings	0	0	–	0
10 wickets in match	0	0	–	0
Best bowling	1/10	1/7	–	2/16
Catches/stumpings	4/–	45/–	1/–	119/–
Medal record
Women's Cricket
Representing Australia
ICC Women's Cricket World Cup
Winner	1997 India
Runner-up	2000 New Zealand
Winner	2005 South Africa
- Source: CricketArchive, 31 December 2022

Belinda Jane Clark AO (born 10 September 1970) is an Australian former cricketer and sports administrator. A right-handed batter, she served as the captain of the national women's team for eleven years and was a member of triumphant World Cup campaigns in 1997 and 2005. The first player to record a double century in the One Day International (ODI) format of the game, Clark has scored the most runs (4,844 at an average of 47.49) and captained the most matches (101 at a winning rate of 83%) of any Australian woman in ODIs. She has also achieved success domestically, winning five championships with New South Wales and two with Victoria while playing in the Women's National Cricket League (WNCL).

Widely considered a pioneer of the game, Clark was the first woman inducted into the Australian Cricket Hall of Fame and the second in the ICC Cricket Hall of Fame. Besides her accomplishments on the field she had also contributed to the sport off the field through efforts to grow the game while serving in various administration roles, including as an executive for Cricket Australia and a member of the International Cricket Council's Women's Committee.

== Early life ==
Clark was born in Newcastle, New South Wales to father Allan, a school teacher and inter-district cricketer, and mother Margaret, a state tennis champion. She grew up with three siblings—an older sister and brother, Sally and Colin, and a younger sister Helen—and started her schooling in Werris Creek where her father was then principal.

Before learning women could represent their country in cricket, Clark dreamt of winning Wimbledon and honed her hand-eye coordination by frequently hitting tennis balls against her garage door and a brick wall at Hamilton South Primary School. She began playing on girls' cricket teams at the age of 13 while attending Newcastle High School. Clark's development in the sport was helped along by Australian player and fellow Newcastle product, Sally Griffiths, who would drive her to Sydney on weekends to play for Gordon District Cricket Club.

== International career ==
=== Test and ODI debut ===
Clark made her international cricket debut on 17 January 1991 in an ODI against New Zealand at Bellerive Oval, opening the batting and scoring 36 in Australia's eight-wicket victory. Less than two weeks later, she scored a century on Test debut against India at North Sydney Oval, though her whirlwind emergence could not help her team muster more than a draw.

=== Assumption of captaincy, first World Cup title ===
Following Australia's uncharacteristically poor World Cup performance in 1993, a slew of changes were made to the team, including the axing of several senior players and the elevation of Clark to the role of captain. When exiled batter Denise Annetts publicly claimed she had been dropped from the national team on the basis of her heterosexuality and marital status, a furious Clark responded via the media, stating she'd like to "slap her around".

With the addition of coach John Harmer, several young talents, and a revitalised style of attacking play, Clark's team embarked on what would be a golden period of success, notably coming to fruition in early-1997. Having scored 131 from just 97 balls in a thumping 374-run ODI win against Pakistan on 7 February, she carried on with her own impressive individual form against more formidable opposition a week later during an away Rose Bowl series. In the second ODI of the tour, Clark delivered an innings of 142 in an 89-run defeat of New Zealand at Eden Park, while the next highest score by a teammate was just 28—a performance she cites as her best.

Clark helped kickstart Australia's 1997 World Cup campaign with an innings of 93 not out, and an unbeaten 167-run partnership with Joanne Broadbent, to defeat South Africa by ten wickets at M. Chinnaswamy Stadium. In her next innings, she made 229 not out against rank underdog Denmark at Middle Income Group Ground—the first time a player would record a double century in ODI cricket. In the final at Eden Gardens against New Zealand, Clark top-scored for her team with 52 runs in a successful low-target chase to clinch the championship for Australia. She compiled a total of 970 runs in 1997 which remains a Women's ODI record for the most runs in a single calendar year.

=== Winning streaks, World Cup loss ===
During the third Test of Australia's 1998 tour of England, Clark recorded her second century in international red ball cricket, scoring a career-best 136 and putting on a 174-run partnership with Karen Rolton. On the fourth day of play, she claimed her only career Test wicket, dismissing Barbara Daniels for 38. Like the two previous results in the series, the match ended in a draw.

Although a then record 17-consecutive ODI victories would come to an end with two-straight losses against New Zealand in February 1999, Clark's team quickly rebounded to begin a 16-match ODI winning streak. This new unbeaten string of games included a comprehensive 220-run defeat of England on 3 February 2000 in Newcastle, ignited by the captain's unbeaten innings of 146 in her hometown.

Clark led Australia through the group stage of the 2000 Cricket World Cup and put on a 170-run partnership with Lisa Keightley in the semi-final to defeat South Africa by nine wickets at Bert Sutcliffe Oval. In the final against host nation New Zealand, she earned Player of the Match honours with an innings of 91, but it was not enough to secure victory as Australia posted a total of 180 to fall five runs short of victory.

=== Second World Cup title, retirement ===
Despite her own indifferent form with the bat in mid-2001, Clark captained Australia to victory in the Women's Ashes, defeating England 2–0 in the two-Test series. She displayed her typically dominant form over the last four matches of the quadrangular 2002–03 World Series of Women's Cricket, managing three half-centuries and a score of 49, culminating in an innings of 80 against New Zealand in the final which Australia comfortably won by 109 runs. A week later, in the first Test of the 2002–03 Women's Ashes at the Gabba, Clark scored a match-high 47 in the fourth innings to steer her team to a trophy-retaining five-wicket victory, capping off a see-sawing contest wherein Australia recovered from being bowled out for 78 on the second day of play.

Clark's most significant innings of the 2005 World Cup took place against England in the semi-final at Sedgars Park, top-scoring with a defiant 62 as her team went on to win by five wickets. Although she would make just 19 in the final, Australia convincingly defeated India by 98 runs to win their second world championship under her tenure as captain.

After making a pair in the first Test of the 2005 Women's Ashes, Clark managed scores of 18 and 2 in the second match of the series, which Australia lost 2–0. It would be her last Test appearance, finishing her 15-match career with a total of 919 runs at an average of 45.95. She then made her 118th and last ODI appearance on 1 September, scoring 36—equalling her debut performance—in a four-run win. However, her final international cricket appearance did not occur until the following day when Australia and England played in the second official Women's Twenty20 International. She scored four runs and took one catch in the seven-wicket win. Clark announced her retirement from all forms of cricket on 16 September 2005.

== International centuries ==
=== Test centuries ===
Belinda Clark's Test centuries
No.	Runs	Opponents	City/Country	Venue	Year
1	104	India	Sydney, Australia	North Sydney Oval	1991
2	136	England	Worcester, England	New Road	1998

=== One Day International centuries ===
Belinda Clark's One Day International centuries
No.	Runs	Opponents	City/Country	Venue	Year
1	131	Pakistan	Melbourne, Australia	Wesley Cricket Ground	1997
2	142	New Zealand	Auckland, New Zealand	Eden Park	1997
3	229 not out	Denmark	Mumbai, India	Middle Income Group Ground	1997
4	146 not out	England	Newcastle, Australia	Newcastle Number 1 Sports Ground	2000
5	120	New Zealand	Hamilton, New Zealand	Seddon Park	2004

== Off the field ==
In 1999, the Commonwealth Bank became a sponsor of the national women's team after the daughter of CEO David Murray participated in a school clinic run by Clark. The partnership between the Commonwealth Bank and women's cricket in Australia continued until the conclusion of the 2024/2025 season.

Cricket NSW and Cricket Australia have named awards in Clark's honour, both annually recognising the best performing player for each respective women's team. The Bradman Foundation selected her as its honouree of 2017. In October 2019 she was named winner of the Arts, Culture and Sport category in The Australian Financial Review's 100 Women of Influence awards.

Clark studied at the University of Sydney and completed a degree in Applied Science (Physiotherapy). She also completed the Advanced Management Program at Harvard Business School. In December 2020, Clark started her own business called The Leadership Playground, aimed at helping girls between the ages of 10 and 15 develop and grow skills for leadership positions.

A running enthusiast, Clark has competed in several long-distance races, including the Paris Marathon. She cites various tennis players, such as John McEnroe and Martina Navratilova, as her first sporting heroes before idolising Australian cricketers from the 1970s, including Kim Hughes and Greg Chappell.

In January 2023, a bronze statue of Clark was unveiled at the entrance to the Sydney Cricket Ground's Walk of Honour. Deliberately placed alongside statues of two of Australia's greatest men's captains in Richie Benaud and Steve Waugh, it is the world's first sculpture of a female cricketer.

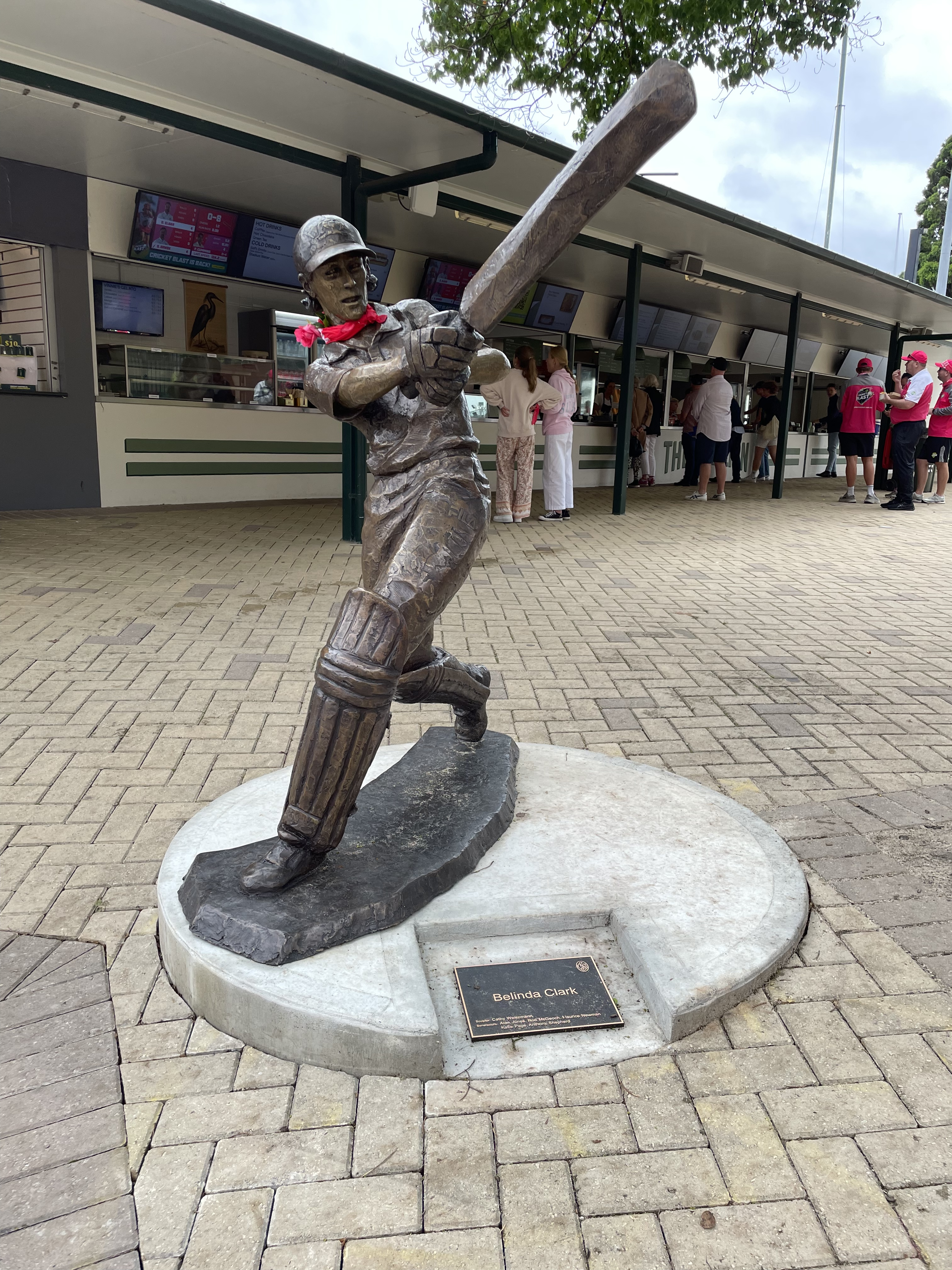
Statue of Belinda Clark at the SCG

=== Administrator ===
While in the midst of her playing career, Clark took on the role of Chief Executive Officer for Women's Cricket Australia (WCA) in September 2000. Following the merger of WCA and Cricket Australia (CA), she performed a number of managerial roles within CA for nearly 20 years. After her retirement from playing the game in September 2005, Clark took on a new position as manager of the Australian Cricket Academy in Brisbane until June 2017. In 2018, she moved on to the role of Executive General Manager of Community Cricket for two-and-a-half years before stepping down in September 2020.

In addition to her roles for Australian cricket, Clark sought to make worldwide contributions to the game, which included serving as a member of the International Cricket Council's Women's Committee for over a decade. She was also appointed Director of the ICC T20 World Cup 2020 Local Organising Committee.

== Honours ==
Team

- 2× Women's Cricket World Cup champion: 1997, 2005
- 7× Women's National Cricket League champion: 1996–97, 1997–98, 1998–99, 1999–00, 2000–01, 2002–03, 2004–05

Individual

- Sport Australia Hall of Fame Legend: 2025
- Officer of the Order of Australia: 2018
- ICC Cricket Hall of Fame inductee: 2011
- Australian Cricket Hall of Fame inductee: 2014
- Sport Australia Hall of Fame inductee: 2011
- Women's Cricket World Cup Player of the Final: 2000
- 3× Women's National Cricket League Player of the Season: 1997–98, 1998–99, 2003–04
- 3× Women's National Cricket League Player of the Finals: 1997–98, 2002–03, 2003–04
- Wisden Australia Cricketer of the Year: 1998

In January 2023, a full size statue of Clark was unveiled at the Sydney Cricket Ground.

== See also ==
- Belinda Clark Award
