= Katharine Winks =

English cricketer

Personal information
- Full name: Katharine Victoria Winks
- Born: 16 March 1978 (age 48); Bristol, England
- Batting: Left-handed
- Bowling: Right-arm medium

International information
- National side: England (1998–2000)
- ODI debut (cap 77): 18 July 1998 v Australia
- Last ODI: 1 February 2000 v Australia

Domestic team information
- Years: Team
- 1992–1999: West
- 2000: Somerset

Career statistics
Competition	WODI	WFC	WLA
Matches	7	4	59
Runs scored	24	91	487
Batting average	12.00	22.75	14.75
100s/50s	0/0	0/0	0/0
Top score	15	31*	46
Balls bowled	222	456	2,776
Wickets	2	5	51
Bowling average	60.00	35.80	28.41
5 wickets in innings	0	0	0
10 wickets in match	0	0	0
Best bowling	1/15	2/39	4/13
Catches/stumpings	1/–	1/–	7/–
- Source: CricketArchive, 6 January 2021

Katharine Victoria Winks (born 16 March 1978) is an English former cricketer who played as a right-arm medium bowler and left-handed batter. She appeared in seven One Day Internationals for England between 1998 and 2000. She primarily played domestic cricket for West and Somerset.

== Early life ==
Winks was born on 16 March 1978 in Bristol, England.

== Domestic career ==
Winks played for West of England in the Women's Area Championship and latterly the Women's County Championship between 1992 and 1999. After West of England were abolished, she played for Somerset in 2000. She also made four appearances for Midwest Women, including three in the Women's Territorial Tournament and one tourist match against New Zealand.

== International career ==
Winks appeared for various England youth teams including Junior England, England Under-20s, England Under-21s and England Under-23s before making her senior debut in a One Day International against Australia at Hove on 18 July 1998. She bowled two overs for 10 runs and scored 2 runs before being run out. In total she played in seven One Day Internationals, with her final appearance coming against Australia at Bradman Oval, Bowral on 1 February 2000. In total she took two wickets at an average of 60 runs.
