= Bronwyn Calver =

Australian cricketer

Personal information
- Full name: Bronwyn Lianne Calver
- Born: 22 September 1969 (age 57); Footscray, Victoria
- Batting: Right-handed
- Bowling: Right-arm Fast medium

International information
- National side: Australia
- Test debut (cap 135): 6 August 1998 v England
- Last Test: 21 August 1998 v England
- ODI debut (cap 65): 17 January 1991 v New Zealand
- Last ODI: 25 July 1998 v Ireland

Domestic team information
- Years: Team
- 1982/83–1994/95: Australian Capital Territory
- 1996/97–2003/04: New South Wales

Career statistics
| Competition | Test | WODI | FC | LA |
|---|---|---|---|---|
| Matches | 3 | 34 | 26 | 152 |
| Runs scored | 80 | 534 | 878 | 1,836 |
| Batting average | 26.66 | 23.12 | 35.12 | 28.24 |
| 100s/50s | 0/0 | 0/1 | 2/4 | 0/11 |
| Top score | 28 | 81* | 114* | 82 |
| Balls bowled | 814 | 1654 | 5,051 | 7,943 |
| Wickets | 5 | 29 | 66 | 167 |
| Bowling average | 47.40 | 22.37 | 19.98 | 21.53 |
| 5 wickets in innings | 0 | 0 | 3 | 0 |
| 10 wickets in match | 0 | 0 | 0 | 0 |
| Best bowling | 3/62 | 4/4 | 5/40 | 4/4 |
| Catches/stumpings | 2/- | 8/– | 9/– | 45/– |
- Source: CricInfo, 23 May 2014

Bronwyn Lianne Calver (born 22 September 1969) is a former Australian cricketer who played as an all-rounder for the national team. She participated in two World Cups, in 1993 and in 1997, and was part of the winning team in the latter tournament.

== Early life ==
Calver and her family moved from Broadmeadows to Canberra in 1980. After being alerted to cricket by a school flyer saying "Junior cricketers wanted", she started playing the game at the age of 11 in the 1980–81 season. On some weekends in the early 1980s, she would participate in a junior boys' game and in lower-grade men's cricket on the Saturday, and then take part in the schoolgirls' and senior women's competitions on the Sunday.

For about seven years, Calver played in women's cricket matches alongside her mother, Beverley. In 1981, the two of them even co-opted her then 69 year old grandmother, Lily, who did not have a cricket background, to make up the numbers and avoid a forfeiture, in a match in which they all played for Northern Suburbs DCC team against Braddon Catholic Girls High School. Calver has since described the occasion as "pretty cool".

== Domestic career ==
Calver made her top level domestic debut for the Australian Capital Territory in 1983, aged 13yrs 105 days. She also played four seasons in the men's lower grade competition for Northern Suburbs up until 1989.

Her bowling style was "... front on [in]swing bowling, with the occasional leg cutter, off cutter or slower ball ..." Her best bowling figures in top level domestic cricket were 5/40 (for the ACT against Victoria). She was also an attacking middle order batter.

From 1983 to 1995, Calver represented the ACT, playing 61 matches, taking 100 wickets at an average of 19.39, and scoring 1518 runs at an average of 18.85. After the ACT withdrew from senior national competition in 1995, she played for New South Wales from 1996 until 2004, taking part in 80 matches, and winning seven WNCL titles. For NSW, she took 95 wickets at an average of 22.96 (best bowling 3/18), and scored 509 runs at an average of 18.85, with two 50s including a top score of 61.

Calver became the first player to take 100 wickets and score 1,500 runs in top level domestic cricket.

== International career ==
Calver played her first international match in 1991 against New Zealand at Bellerive Oval, Hobart, as a late replacement for the Australian team captain, Lyn Larsen, who was suffering from food poisoning. After that series where she played in the third match, she did not play in another international match for nearly two years; Australia had a very strong team, and there were relatively few international women's fixtures at the time. However, she then participated in the team's disastrous 1993 World Cup campaign in England, in which Australia lost to eventual tournament winner England, and was then heavily defeated by the other eventual finalist, New Zealand.

Four years later, in 1997, at the peak of her career, she played a major role in Australia's atonement for its 1993 let-down: the team's victory in the 1997 World Cup final at Eden Gardens in Calcutta (now Kolkata), India.

In that match, against New Zealand, she took 2 wickets for 29 runs. Her victims included star batter Emily Drumm, who fell to a hooping inswinger, since described by Calver as "... probably the best ball I ever bowled," which took Drumm's middle stump. Later, Calver had the honour of hitting Australia's winning runs: "I was in the right place at the right time. I played [the ball] forward of point and just remember putting my hand in the air. It was so good."

The following year, 1998, Calver compressed her three-Test career into as many weeks in the inaugural Women's Ashes, an anticlimactic series of three rain-affected draws on lifeless English pitches. At the end of that series, she retired from international cricket. "I made the mistake of retiring too early," she has since said. After a couple of further seasons playing for New South Wales, she reversed her decision and contacted the chair of selectors in the aftermath of Australia's loss in the 2000 World Cup final, but did not hear anything back.

By the end of her international career, Calver had played in three Tests and 34 One Day Internationals. In the latter form of the game, she took 29 wickets at an average of 22.41 and just 2.3 runs/over, and scored 531 runs at 53.4 and a strike rate of 75.2. Her best international bowling figures were 4/4 off 12 overs (against the West Indies, World Cup 1993), and her highest international score was 81*.

== Other sports ==
Calver has said that she would give most sports a try. Even while playing cricket, she was a youth international association football goalkeeper, until football officials gave her an ultimatum to choose between the two sports. Later, in her spare time, she was a FIFA assistant referee/referee who officiated at international level.

At the age of 38, several years after ending her top level cricket career, Calver took up Australian rules football playing for the Gungahlin Jets. She gave that sport away when she was 45, because recovery from games was taking too long. Meanwhile, she played two seasons of baseball for the Ainslie Bears team, winning a premiership in 2009-10.

== Post retirement activities ==
Calver came out of her representative cricketing retirement in 2006 to help the fledgling ACT Meteors compete in the Cricket Australia Cup in preparation for its entry into the WNCL in 2009–10. In her last match of the 2007/8 season representative season, against South Australia, she returned figures of 10 overs, 9 maidens, and 7 wickets for 2 just wides. At the end of the season, she won the aptly-named Bronwyn Calver Medal for the best ACT Meteors cricketer.

Calver's involvement in cricket after completing her international career has included being the women's statistician for Cricket Australia and the on-line scorer at Manuka Oval. In 2013, she was a member of the team that won the inaugural ACT indoor cricket title, for which the prize was the similarly aptly-named Bronwyn Calver Cup.

After a seven season break from playing club cricket, since the 2016–17 season, Calver has played for Barton in the Canberra City & Suburban Cricket Association. She missed the 2018/19 season after rupturing her Achilles tendon while playing indoor cricket but spent the season scoring for Barton's 4th grade team, and returned to play the following season, captaining the 5th grade team. She captained the 6th grade in the 2020/21 season and then captained the 3rd grade side in the following season. She was a member of their first-grade side for the period 2022/23-2024/25. This side was relegated to second-grade side for the 2025/26 season but they return to first-grade for the 2026/27 season after winning Barton's first premiership since 2014/15.

In November 2019, she was a member of the undefeated NSW Blues team in the precursor to the Over 40s Women's national championships played at Bradman Oval in Bowral.

After a COVID enforced break, the National Over 40s Women's Cricket national championships commenced in November 2022 with two divisions & 8 teams, held in Geelong alongside the Men's Over 60s. NSW tied with Victoria in the Division 1 final.

The national championships have since been held as standalone tournaments - in Wollongong (November 2023: three divisions, 15 teams); Adelaide (October 2024: 3 divisions, 20 teams) and Perth (November 2025: 3 divisions, 20 teams) - with Queensland winning the Division 1 title defeating NSW in 2023 and 2024. NSW defeated Victoria in 2025 to win their first outright title. Calver has been a member of the NSW Blues at each championships. 2026 will see the championship split into O40s and O50s

== Personal life ==
When not engaged in sporting activity, Calver has worked as a federal public servant since 1992. As of 2026, she remains employed with the same department now named Department of Infrastructure, Transport, Regional Development, Communications, Sports and the Arts. While riding home from work one evening in January 2015, she was involved in an accident when a kangaroo collided with her bicycle and went briefly viral after the incident was captured on her GoPro. In the accident, she suffered a knee injury that required multiple stitches; the kangaroo, which appeared to be dazed and "disoriented" by the impact, died soon afterwards when it was struck by a passing car.

== Recognition ==
- 2013 – Calver was inducted into the ACT Sport Hall of Fame
- 2019 – Calver was one of the first six inductees into the Cricket ACT Hall of Fame. The other five were Peter Solway, Michael Bevan, Lorne Lees, Glenda Hall and Greg Irvine.
- 2020 - Calver was awarded Life Membership of Cricket ACT
- The "Bronwyn Calver Medal" is awarded to the ACT Meteors Player of the Year.
- Calver is a life member of the Gordon Cricket Club, Women's Division
- 2023 - Named in Cricket ACT Women's Team of the Century.
