= Michelle Goszko =

Australian cricketer (born 1977)

Personal information
- Full name: Michelle Ann Jane Goszko
- Batting: Right-handed
- Bowling: Right-arm medium

International information
- National side: Australia
- Test debut (cap 138): 24 June 2001 v England
- Last Test: 18 February 2006 v India
- ODI debut (cap 85): 8 November 1997 v New Zealand
- Last ODI: 28 October 2006 v New Zealand
- Only T20I (cap 14): 18 October 2006 v New Zealand

Career statistics
Competition	Test	ODI	T20I	LA
Matches	4	34	1	152
Runs scored	217	669	9	3,566
Batting average	43.40	25.73	9.00	27.43
100s/50s	1/0	0/5	0/0	1/15
Top score	204	51*	9	116
Balls bowled	0	36	0	258
Wickets	–	1	–	1
Bowling average	–	15.00	–	27.43
5 wickets in innings	–	0	–	0
10 wickets in match	–	0	–	0
Best bowling	–	1/3	–	1/3
Catches/stumpings	2/–	13/–	0/–	42/–
- Source: Cricinfo, 7 August 2025

Michelle Ann Jane Goszko (born 7 October 1977) is a former Australian cricketer. A right-handed batter and occasional right-arm medium pace bowler, she played 4 Test matches for Australia between 2001 and 2006, scoring 217 runs, a low return after making a double-century on her Test debut against England in June 2001. She has also played 34 One Day Internationals for Australia, scoring 669 runs with an average in the mid-twenties.
