= Bert Sutcliffe Oval =

Cricket ground in Lincoln, New Zealand

Coordinates: 43.6467°S 172.4628°E

- BIL Oval
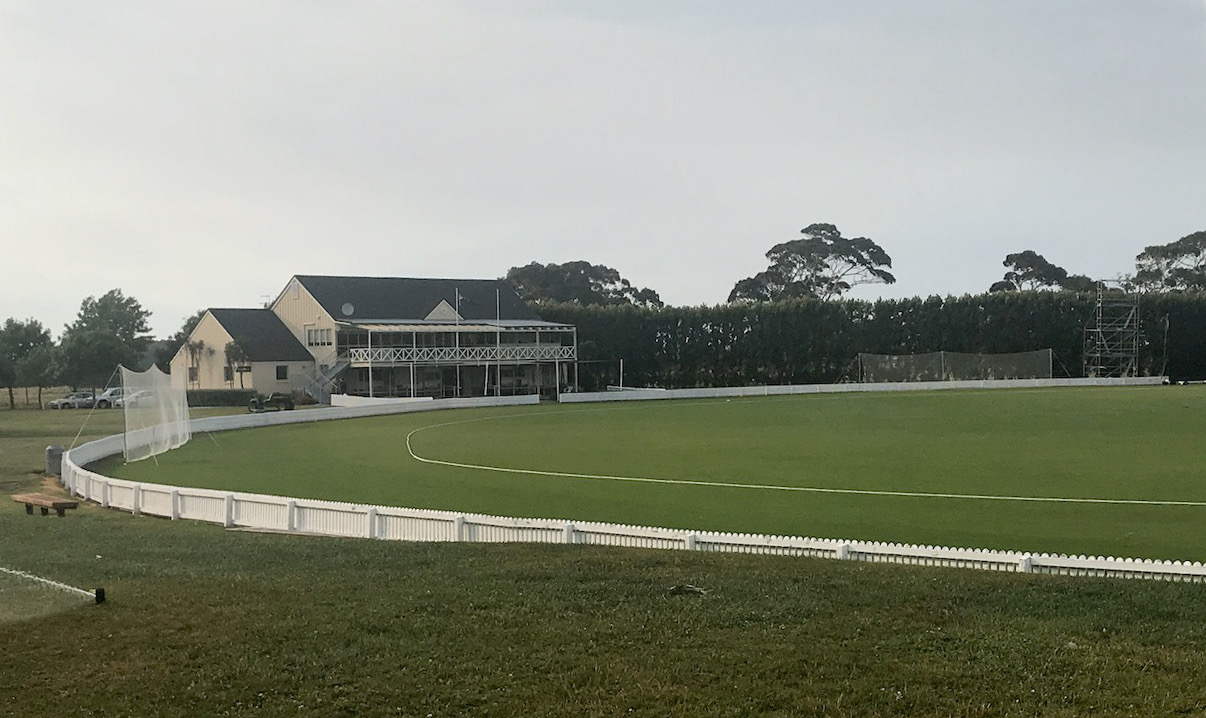
- Bert Sutcliffe Oval

Ground information
- Location: Lincoln, New Zealand
- Country: New Zealand
- Establishment: 1998
- Tenants: New Zealand cricket team
- End names
- Pavilion End; City End

International information
- First ODI: 23 January 2014: Kenya v Netherlands
- Last ODI: 1 February 2014: Scotland v United Arab Emirates
- First WODI: 29 November 2000: New Zealand v Australia
- Last WODI: 8 March 2018: New Zealand v West Indies
- First WT20I: 6 March 2008: New Zealand v Australia
- Last WT20I: 24 February 2015: New Zealand v England

Team information
New Zealand Academy	(1998–present)
- As of 1 September 2020; Source: ESPNcricinfo

The Bert Sutcliffe Oval is a cricket ground at Lincoln University in Lincoln, New Zealand that has staged first-class matches as well as international matches for both women's and under-19 level cricket. Previously known as BIL Oval, in February 2001 the ground was renamed in honour of the New Zealand opening batsman at the request of benefactor Michael Watt.

The ground staged its maiden first-class match in November 1999 when England A played the North Island in the Shell Conference. It has since staged a number of A team matches as well as domestic fixtures including the 2009 State Championship final.

The ground has most often been used to host Women's One Day International cricket. It staged the final and both semi-finals of the 2000 Women's World Cup, was the major venue at the World Series of Women's Cricket in 2003 and regularly hosts New Zealand women's team matches against touring sides.

The ground hosted its first Men's One Day International between Netherlands and Kenya during the 2014 Cricket World Cup Qualifier on 23 January 2014.

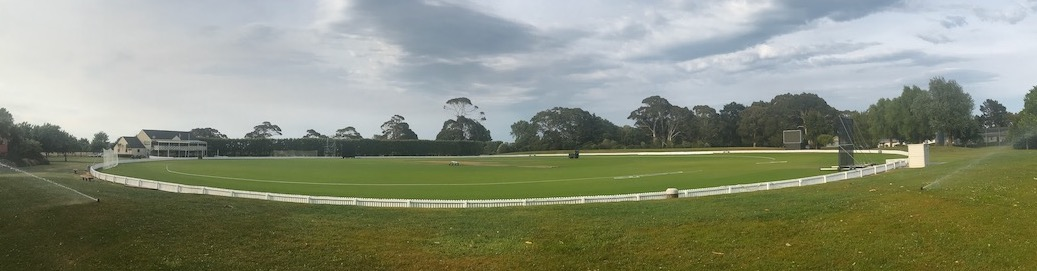

== International centuries ==
=== One Day International centuries ===
Only two ODIs have been played at the venue and three centuries have been achieved.

No.	Score	Player	Team	Balls	Inns.	Opposing team	Date	Result
1	137*	Wesley Barresi	Netherlands	150	1	Kenya	23 January 2014	Lost
2	108	Irfan Karim	Kenya	84	2	Netherlands	23 January 2014	Won
3	139*	Preston Mommsen	Scotland	149	1	United Arab Emirates	1 February 2014	Won

=== Women's One Day International centuries ===
14 WODI centuries have been scored at the Bert Sutcliffe Oval.

No.	Score	Player	Team	Balls	Inns.	Opposing team	Date	Result
1	139*	Charlotte Edwards (1/2)	England	152	1	Netherlands	30 November 2000	Won
2	137*	Claire Taylor (1/2)	England	145	1	Sri Lanka	12 December 2000	Won
3	107*	Karen Rolton (1/2)	Australia	67	2	South Africa	13 December 2000	Won
4	114	Rebecca Rolls	New Zealand	120	1	Australia	6 March 2002	Lost
5	105*	Karen Rolton (2/2)	Australia	102	2	New Zealand	6 March 2002	Won
6	111*	Claire Taylor (2/2)	England	111	2	New Zealand	25 February 2008	Won
7	137*	Charlotte Edwards (2/2)	England	88	1	New Zealand	3 March 2012	Won
8	109*	Sarah Taylor	England	113	2	New Zealand	5 March 2012	Won
9	108	Rachel Priest (1/2)	New Zealand	116	1	Sri Lanka	3 November 2015	Won
10	157	Rachel Priest (2/2)	New Zealand	146	1	Sri Lanka	7 November 2015	Won
11	137*	Amy Satterthwaite (1/2)	New Zealand	117	1	Pakistan	11 November 2016	Won
12	115*	Amy Satterthwaite (2/2)	New Zealand	101	2	Pakistan	13 November 2016	Won
13	108	Sophie Devine	New Zealand	103	1	West Indies	4 March 2018	Won
14	101*	Suzie Bates	New Zealand	86	2	West Indies	8 March 2018	Won

== List of Five Wicket Hauls ==
=== Women's One Day Internationals ===
No.	Bowler	Date	Team	Opposing team	Inn	Overs	Runs	Wkts	Econ	Result
1	Sarah Collyer	30 November 2000	England	Netherlands	2	10	32	5	3.20	Won
2	Nooshin Al Khadeer	27 January 2003	India	England	1	6.5	14	5	2.04	Won
3	Cathryn Fitzpatrick	6 February 2003	Australia	New Zealand	1	9.1	27	5	2.94	Won
4	Beth McNeill	24 February 2008	New Zealand	England	2	10	32	6	3.20	Won
5	Emma Sampson	15 March 2008	Australia	New Zealand	2	10	30	5	3.00	Won
6	Holly Huddleston	24 February 2014	New Zealand	West Indies	2	10	36	5	3.60	Won
7	Felicity Leydon-Davis	26 February 2014	New Zealand	West Indies	2	8.2	18	5	2.16	Won
8	Kate Cross	26 February 2015	England	New Zealand	1	10	24	5	2.40	Won
9	Morna Nielsen	10 November 2015	New Zealand	Sri Lanka	1	10	21	5	2.10	Won
