= Clare Nicholson =

New Zealand cricketer (born 1967)

Personal information
- Full name: Clare Maree Nicholson
- Born: 20 September 1967 (age 59); Auckland, New Zealand
- Batting: Right-handed
- Bowling: Right-arm off break
- Role: Bowler

International information
- National side: New Zealand (1995–2000)
- Test debut (cap 105): 7 February 1995 v India
- Last Test: 4 July 1996 v England
- ODI debut (cap 64): 12 February 1995 v India
- Last ODI: 23 December 2000 v Australia

Domestic team information
- Years: Team
- 1988/89–1989/90: North Shore
- 1990/91–1993/94: North Harbour
- 1994/95–2000/01: Auckland

Career statistics
Competition	WTest	WODI	WFC	WLA
Matches	4	35	23	93
Runs scored	140	195	645	949
Batting average	28.00	16.25	18.42	16.94
100s/50s	0/0	0/1	0/2	0/4
Top score	46	73*	56	79*
Balls bowled	460	1,636	3,027	4,030
Wickets	5	38	67	106
Bowling average	34.00	18.60	14.55	17.54
5 wickets in innings	0	0	4	1
10 wickets in match	0	0	1	0
Best bowling	2/25	4/18	6/54	5/4
Catches/stumpings	1/–	13/–	14/–	23/–
- Source: CricketArchive, 16 April 2021

Clare Nicholson (born 20 September 1967) is a New Zealand former cricketer who played primarily as a right-arm off break bowler. She appeared in 4 Test matches and 35 One Day Internationals for New Zealand between 1995 and 2000. Her final WODI appearance was in the final of the 2000 Women's Cricket World Cup. She played domestic cricket for North Shore, North Harbour and Auckland.
