= Debbie Hockley =

New Zealand cricketer

Debbie Hockley CNZM
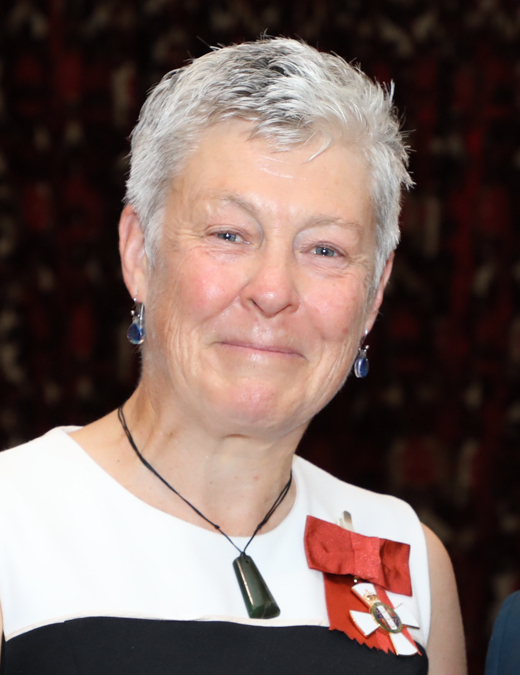
- Hockley in 2021

Personal information
- Full name: Deborah Ann Hockley
- Born: 7 November 1962 (age 64); Christchurch, New Zealand
- Batting: Right-handed
- Bowling: Right-arm medium
- Role: All-rounder

International information
- National side: New Zealand (1979–2000)
- Test debut (cap 74): 26 January 1979 v Australia
- Last Test: 12 July 1996 v England
- ODI debut (cap 27): 10 January 1982 v England
- Last ODI: 23 December 2000 v Australia

Domestic team information
- Years: Team
- 1977/78–1984/85: Canterbury
- 1985/86–1989/90: North Shore
- 1990/91–1999/00: Canterbury

Career statistics
Competition	WTest	WODI	WFC	WLA
Matches	19	118	89	214
Runs scored	1,301	4,066	5,105	8,225
Batting average	52.04	41.91	51.05	49.54
100s/50s	4/7	4/34	12/23	11/66
Top score	126*	117	164*	141
Balls bowled	492	1,521	1,596	3,497
Wickets	5	20	29	94
Bowling average	29.20	42.65	21.75	19.72
5 wickets in innings	0	0	0	1
10 wickets in match	0	0	0	0
Best bowling	2/9	3/49	4/26	5/18
Catches/stumpings	9/–	41/–	54/–	75/–
- Source: CricketArchive, 3 August 2021

Deborah Ann Hockley CNZM (born 7 November 1962) is a New Zealand former cricketer who played as a right-handed batter and right-arm medium bowler. Hockley was the first woman to become President of New Zealand Cricket. She is the highest runs-scorer in the Women's Cricket World Cup.

== Domestic career ==
Hockley played domestic cricket for Canterbury and North Shore.

== International career ==
Hockley appeared in 19 Test matches for New Zealand, making a high score of 126 not out and averaging 52.04 with the bat. Hockley captained New Zealand in six Tests, drawing them all. She also appeared in 118 One Day Internationals for New Zealand, averaging 41.89 with the bat. She captained New Zealand in 27 of them, winning 12 and losing 15. She was also Player of the Match in the World Cup final in India in 1997 and holds the record for scoring the most runs by any woman in the ICC Women's Cricket World Cup (1501), playing in five World Cups.

Hockley was the first woman to reach 4000 ODI runs and to play 100 ODIs. She was also the first woman to score 1,000 runs in ODIs for New Zealand. Her international career spanned from 1979 to 2000.

== International centuries ==
Test centuries
Runs	Match	Opponents	City	Venue	Year
107*	6	England	Canterbury, England	St Lawrence Ground	1984
126*	8	Australia	Auckland, New Zealand	Cornwall Park	1990
107	14	India	Nelson, New Zealand	Trafalgar Park	1995
115	18	England	Worcester, England	New Road	1996

Source: CricInfo

One-Day International centuries
Runs	Match	Opponents	City	Venue	Year
117	74	England	Chester-le-Street, England	Riverside Ground	1996
100*	87	Sri Lanka	Chandigarh, India	Sector 16 Stadium	1997
100	88	West Indies	Chandigarh, India	Sector 16 Stadium	1997
100	99	Australia	Melbourne, Australia	Albert Cricket Ground	2000

Source: CricInfo

== Honours ==
In the 1999 New Year Honours, Hockley was appointed a Member of the New Zealand Order of Merit, for services to cricket. She was the fourth woman to be inducted into the ICC Cricket Hall of Fame in 2013. Her final WODI appearance was in the final of the 2000 Women's Cricket World Cup.

In 2016 she was the first woman to be elected president of New Zealand Cricket in its 122-year history.

In the 2021 New Year Honours, Hockley was promoted to Companion of the New Zealand Order of Merit, for services to cricket. In 2023, the award for New Zealand's most outstanding female cricketer of the year, the Debbie Hockley Medal, was named in her honour.

== See also ==
- List of centuries in women's One Day International cricket
- List of centuries in women's Test cricket
