= Catherine Campbell =

New Zealand cricketer (born 1963)

Personal information
- Full name: Catherine Anne Campbell
- Born: 20 July 1963 (age 63); Christchurch, New Zealand
- Batting: Left-handed
- Bowling: Right-arm off break
- Role: Bowler

International information
- National side: New Zealand (1988–2000)
- Test debut (cap 89): 18 January 1990 v Australia
- Last Test: 12 July 1996 v England
- ODI debut (cap 53): 4 December 1988 v Netherlands
- Last ODI: 23 December 2000 v Australia

Domestic team information
- Years: Team
- 1979/80–1981/82: Otago
- 1983/84–1999/00: Canterbury

Career statistics
| Competition | WTest | WODI | WFC | WLA |
|---|---|---|---|---|
| Matches | 9 | 85 | 51 | 172 |
| Runs scored | 55 | 69 | 222 | 371 |
| Batting average | 13.75 | 4.60 | 10.57 | 10.91 |
| 100s/50s | 0/0 | 0/0 | 0/0 | 0/0 |
| Top score | 29 | 12 | 29 | 47 |
| Balls bowled | 2,033 | 4,518 | 8,348 | 8,955 |
| Wickets | 18 | 78 | 172 | 197 |
| Bowling average | 40.00 | 25.87 | 16.04 | 21.53 |
| 5 wickets in innings | 0 | 0 | 10 | 3 |
| 10 wickets in match | 0 | 0 | 1 | 0 |
| Best bowling | 4/94 | 3/15 | 6/38 | 6/26 |
| Catches/stumpings | 2/– | 15/– | 21/– | 34/– |
- Source: Cricket Archive, 29 April 2021

Catherine Anne Campbell (born 20 July 1963) is a New Zealand former cricketer who played as a right-arm off break bowler. She appeared in 9 Test matches and 85 One Day Internationals for New Zealand between 1988 and 2000. She stood in as captain in two ODIs at the 2000 World Cup, which were both won, and her final WODI appearance was in the final of the tournament. She played domestic cricket for Otago and Canterbury.
