= Mel Jones =

Cricketer

Mel Jones OAM
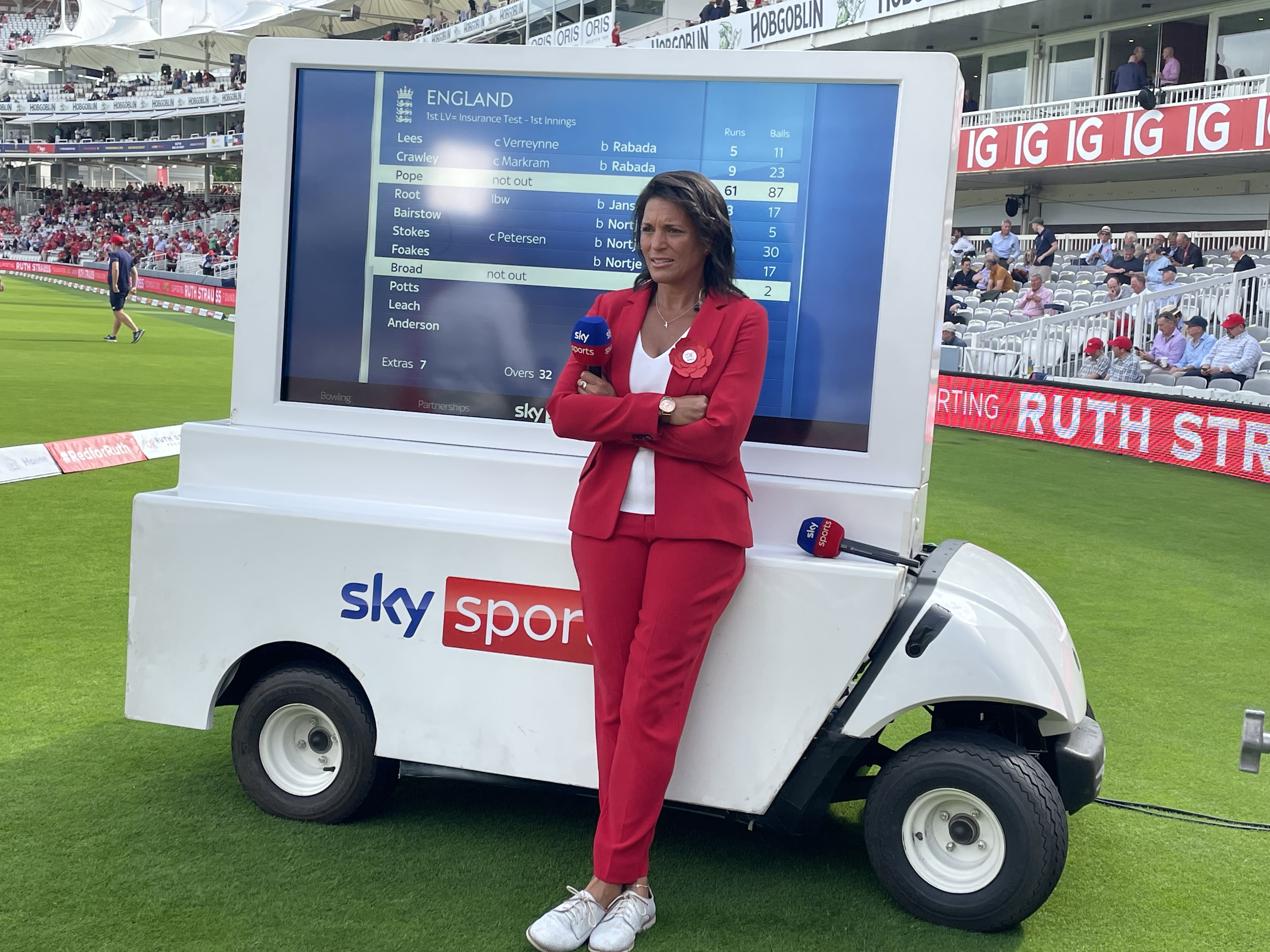
- Cricket commentator Mel Jones on Sky Sports

Personal information
- Full name: Melanie Jones
- Born: 11 August 1972 (age 54); Barnstaple, Devon
- Batting: Right-handed
- Bowling: Right-arm medium

International information
- National side: Australia
- Test debut (cap 134): 6 August 1998 v England
- Last Test: 22 February 2003 v England
- ODI debut (cap 82): 7 February 1997 v Pakistan
- Last ODI: 10 April 2005 v India

Domestic team information
- Years: Team
- 1992/93-2008/09: Victoria
- 2003–2004: Surrey
- 2009/10: Tasmania

Career statistics
Competition	Test	ODI	FC	LA
Matches	5	61	12	226
Runs scored	251	1,028	299	5,177
Batting average	35.85	21.41	17.18	27.10
100s/50s	1/1	0/4	1/1	1/30
Top score	131	58	131	124
Balls bowled	6	12	102	656
Wickets	0	0	0	8
Bowling average	–	–	–	50.87
5 wickets in innings	–	–	–	0
10 wickets in match	–	–	–	0
Best bowling	–	–	–	2/40
Catches/stumpings	3/–	15/–	4/–	80/–
- Source: CricInfo, 7 August 2025

Melanie Jones OAM (born 11 August 1972) is an English-born Australian cricket commentator and former cricketer who represented the Australia women's national cricket team.

== Early life ==
Jones was born at Barnstaple in England and moved with her mother to Melbourne, Australia when she was three months old. Her father, a Trinidadian, stayed back in England. Although she did not meet her father until the age of 16, he played a significant role in fostering her interest in cricket through his connection to West Indian cricket players of the 1970s and 1980s.

Her Elwood Secondary College school development in Melbourne was nurtured by her geography teacher John Handscomb, the father of Australian Test player Peter Handscomb. Jones completed a Bachelor of Applied Science in Human Movement and a Graduate Diploma of Secondary Education teaching at Victoria University. After a short time as a physical education teacher she moved into cricket development and coaching for women and girls across Australia, UK, and South Africa.

She left a career as a sports agent with TGI for some of Australia's leading female athletes after becoming a commentator full time in 2018.

== Playing career ==
Starting her career as an opening bowler for Victoria and Australia U/21s, Jones then developed into a top order bat for the majority of her career. She played 5 Test matches for Australia between 1998 and 2003, scoring 251 runs, highlighted by a 131 on debut against England in August 1998. Jones was the 134th woman to play Test cricket for Australia. She also played 61 One Day Internationals for Australia, scoring 1028 runs winning two World Cups in 1997 and 2005 and two successful women's Ashes campaigns in 1998 and 2002/3.

While working in the development of women and girls' cricket for Surrey County Cricket Board Jones played for the Surrey County women's cricket team and coached their junior teams between 2003 and 2004. She played 122 games for the Victorian Spirit in the Australian Women's National Cricket League, and then five Women's Twenty20 cricket games for the Tasmanian Roar.

== Commentary career ==
Missing an Australian Ashes tour to England in 2001, Jones was asked by Sky Sport to commentate on an ODI between the two teams. Subsequent work trips to England meant one off commentary stints, leading to opportunities in Australia in 2007 with Channel 9 to cover the women's Twenty 20 internationals.

Jones was part of the ICC's first ever coverage of women's world cups in 2009 when she joined Alan Wilkins, Belinda Clark, Debbie Hockley, Danny Morrison and Wasim Akram.

2015 saw Jones, along with Isa Guha, Lisa Sthalekar and Anjum Chopra, join the Indian Premier League as the first women to commentate on the largest domestic cricket competition, a world top-ten sporting competition. She joined Channel 10 in the inaugural season of the Women's Big Bash League, and provided boundary commentary during the 2015–16 Big Bash League, along with commentary in the Pakistan Super League in 2017.

With a change to media rights in Australia in 2018 Jones departed her full time employment as a sports agent and joined the Fox Sports Cricket commentary team which included the first ever production of a women's cricket magazine show, The Blast, with co-host Megan Barnard.

Jones has maintained her connection with Sky Sport Cricket and is a constant part of the England cricket summer across men's and women's Internationals and The Hundred.

Commentary extended to radio stints with BBC, SEN and ABC and her own WBBL vodcast with comedian Bobby Macumber called Pitch Perfect.

Now a regular on ICC men's and women's world cups and T20 world cups, Jones' voice is synonymous with cricket commentary and world cup cricket moments. She has also lent her voice to cricket games like the Ashes Cricket 17 game and various podcasts.

Jones was part of the commentary panel for the 2025 ICC Champions Trophy and the 2025 ICC World Test Championship final.

== Personal life ==
Jones is an ambassador with Australian charity, Red Dust, which promotes health initiatives in remote Aboriginal communities, and is a Victoria University Women in Sport Ambassador. In 2017 she was inducted to the Victorian Honour Roll of Women, while in the 2019 Australia Day Honours, she was awarded the Order of Australia Medal, for services to cricket and the community.

Cricket Victoria became the first Australian state to successfully nominate a woman to the board of Cricket Australia where Jones spent a term working through some of Australian cricket's biggest challenges including hosting T20 World Cups, responding to the COVID pandemic and co-chairing the National Aboriginal and Torres Strait Island Cricket Advisory Committee.
