= Karen Rolton =

Australian cricketer (born 1974)

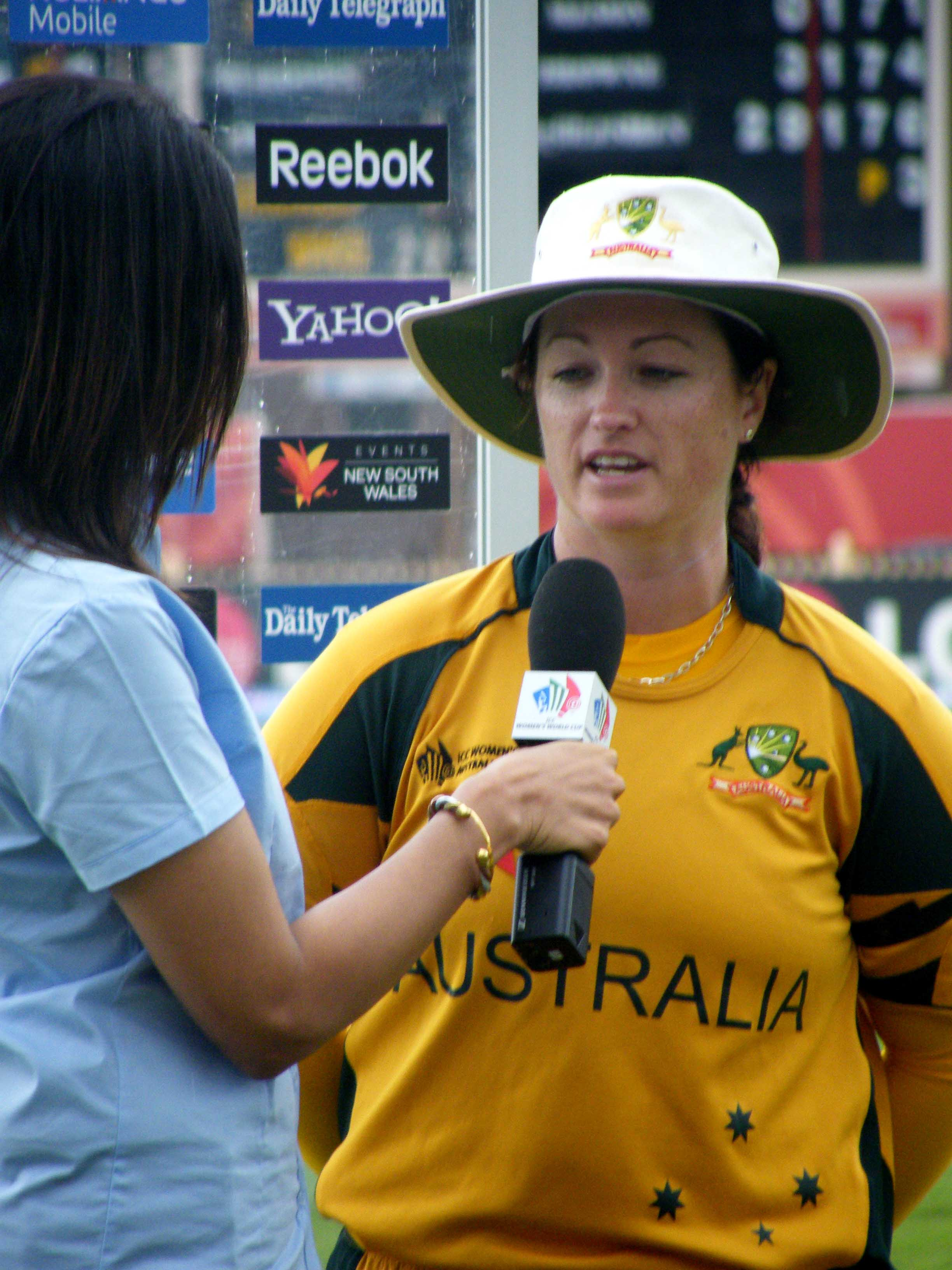

Personal information
- Full name: Karen Louise Rolton
- Born: 21 November 1974 (age 51); Adelaide, South Australia
- Batting: Left-handed
- Bowling: Left-arm medium
- Role: Batter

International information
- National side: Australia (1995–2009)
- Test debut (cap 127): 28 February 1995 v New Zealand
- Last Test: 10 July 2009 v England
- ODI debut (cap 77): 14 February 1995 v New Zealand
- Last ODI: 5 July 2009 v England
- ODI shirt no.: 21
- T20I debut (cap 10): 2 September 2005 v England
- Last T20I: 25 June 2009 v England

Domestic team information
- Years: Team
- 1994/95–2010/11: South Australia

Career statistics
Competition	WTest	WODI	WT20I
Matches	14	141	15
Runs scored	1,002	4,814	405
Batting average	55.66	48.14	50.62
100s/50s	2/5	8/33	0/2
Top score	209*	154*	96*
Balls bowled	1,104	3,267	36
Wickets	14	85	3
Bowling average	23.35	20.81	12.33
5 wickets in innings	0	0	0
10 wickets in match	0	0	0
Best bowling	2/6	4/29	2/26
Catches/stumpings	9/–	25/–	6/–
Medal record
Women's Cricket
Representing Australia
ICC Women's Cricket World Cup
Winner	1997 India
Runner-up	2000 New Zealand
Winner	2005 South Africa
- Source: ESPNcricinfo, 2 January 2017

Karen Louise Rolton (born 21 November 1974) is an Australian former cricketer and captain of the national women's team. A left-handed batter, she has scored the most runs for her country in women's Test cricket.

== International cricket ==
After making her international debut in 1995, Rolton went on to become a member of two successful world championship campaigns. In the final of the 2005 Women's Cricket World Cup, she scored 107 not out and was adjudged Player of the Match. Her numerous individual honours include being named ICC Women's Cricketer of the Year in 2006 and winning the Belinda Clark Award four times. New Zealand coach Steve Jenkin once remarked that the best tactic against her was to avoid dismissing the Australian team's openers so she could not bat.

In 2006, Rolton became the captain of the national team, taking over from Belinda Clark. She led Australia in the 2009 Women's Cricket World Cup on home soil, although the team performed below expectations and finished in fourth place.

=== Records and statistics ===
Across 14 Test matches, Rolton scored 1,002 runs at an average of 55.66 which included two centuries and five half-centuries. She made her top score of 209 not out against England at Headingley in 2001, a world record at the time. She also scored 4,814 runs at 48.14 in Women's One Day Internationals. Rolton became the first player to score a century in the knockout stage of a Women's Cricket World Cup and set a record for the highest individual score on debut in Women's Twenty20 Internationals with 96 not out. In addition to her batting prowess, she enjoyed success as a left-arm medium-pace bowler, taking 102 international wickets across all three formats.

== International centuries ==
Test centuries
No.	Runs	Opponents	City/Country	Venue	Year
1	176 not out	England	Worcester, England	New Road	1998
2	209 not out	England	Leeds, England	Headingley	2001

One Day International centuries
No.	Runs	Opponents	City/Country	Venue	Year
1	113 not out	New Zealand	Wellington, New Zealand	Basin Reserve	1997
2	154 not out	Sri Lanka	Christchurch, New Zealand	Hagley Oval	2000
3	107 not out	South Africa	Lincoln, New Zealand	Bert Sutcliffe Oval	2000
4	105 not out	New Zealand	Lincoln, New Zealand	Bert Sutcliffe Oval	2002
5	102 not out	New Zealand	Auckland, New Zealand	Eden Park Outer Oval	2004
6	107 not out	India	Centurion, South Africa	Centurion Park	2005
7	151	Ireland	Dublin, Ireland	Claremont Road Cricket Ground	2005
8	101	India	Canberra, Australia	Manuka Oval	2008

== Retirement and post-career ==
In January 2010, Rolton announced her retirement from international cricket after a 14-year career. She continued to play domestic cricket for South Australia until the end of the 2010–11 Women's National Cricket League season.

In 2016, Rolton was inducted into the ICC Cricket Hall of Fame. In January 2018, she was inducted into the Australian Cricket Hall of Fame. A few months later, the South Australian Cricket Association unveiled a new community sporting facility in Adelaide, announcing the name of the main ground as Karen Rolton Oval.

Rolton currently lives in Victoria and remains involved with cricket through her coaching roles at the Melbourne Renegades and also at local level.

== Honours ==
=== Team ===
- 2x Women's Cricket World Cup champion: 1997, 2005

=== Individual ===
- ICC Women's Cricketer of the Year: 2006
- Women's Cricket World Cup Player of the Tournament: 2005
- Women's Cricket World Cup Player of the Final: 2005
- 4x Belinda Clark Award winner: 2002, 2003, 2005, 2006
- Sport Australia Hall of Fame inductee: 2021

Preceded by New Award	ICC Women's Cricketer of the Year; 2006	Succeeded by Jhulan Goswami
