= Katrina Keenan =

New Zealand cricketer

Personal information
- Full name: Katrina Marie Keenan
- Born: 24 February 1971 (age 55); Christchurch, New Zealand
- Batting: Right-handed
- Bowling: Right-arm medium-fast
- Role: Bowler

International information
- National side: New Zealand (1995–2000)
- Test debut (cap 104): 7 February 1995 v England
- Last Test: 15 July 1996 v England
- ODI debut (cap 63): 12 February 1995 v India
- Last ODI: 23 December 2000 v Australia

Domestic team information
- Years: Team
- 1991/92–1999/00: Canterbury

Career statistics
Competition	WTest	WODI	WFC	WLA
Matches	5	54	22	111
Runs scored	32	348	439	1,149
Batting average	32.00	12.88	20.90	19.47
100s/50s	0/0	0/1	0/1	1/3
Top score	26*	57*	75	112
Balls bowled	903	2,701	3,170	5,042
Wickets	15	70	56	139
Bowling average	23.20	17.82	16.57	16.96
5 wickets in innings	1	0	3	0
10 wickets in match	0	0	1	0
Best bowling	6/73	4/5	6/27	4/5
Catches/stumpings	4/–	9/–	11/–	17/–
- Source: CricketArchive, 28 April 2021

Katrina Marie Keenan (née Withers; born 24 February 1971) is a New Zealand former cricketer who played as a right-arm medium-fast bowler. She appeared in 5 Test matches and 54 One Day Internationals for New Zealand between 1995 and 2000. Her final WODI appearance was in the final of the 2000 Women's Cricket World Cup. She played domestic cricket for Canterbury. She coached Japan at the 2010 Asian Games.

Keenan was a contestant on season 4 of The Great Kiwi Bake Off, and was the first baker eliminated from the show.
