= Emily Drumm =

New Zealand cricketer

Emily Drumm MNZM
Personal information
- Full name: Emily Cecilia Drumm
- Born: 15 September 1974 (age 52); Auckland, New Zealand
- Batting: Right-handed
- Bowling: Right-arm medium, Right-arm leg break
- Role: All-rounder

International information
- National side: New Zealand (1992–2006)
- Test debut (cap 100): 12 February 1992 v England
- Last Test: 12 July 1996 v England
- ODI debut (cap 55): 19 January 1992 v Australia
- Last ODI: 13 March 2006 v India

Domestic team information
- Years: Team
- 1988/89–2004/05: Auckland
- 2005/06: Northern Districts
- 2006–2010: Kent
- 2015/16–2016/17: Northern Districts

Career statistics
| Competition | WTest | WODI | WFC | WLA |
|---|---|---|---|---|
| Matches | 5 | 101 | 29 | 265 |
| Runs scored | 433 | 2,844 | 1,286 | 8,127 |
| Batting average | 144.33 | 35.11 | 37.82 | 39.07 |
| 100s/50s | 2/2 | 2/19 | 2/6 | 9/53 |
| Top score | 161* | 116 | 161* | 118 |
| Balls bowled | 528 | 1,542 | 3,220 | 3,636 |
| Wickets | 2 | 37 | 62 | 115 |
| Bowling average | 87.50 | 21.02 | 17.38 | 19.06 |
| 5 wickets in innings | 0 | 0 | 1 | 1 |
| 10 wickets in match | 0 | 0 | 0 | 0 |
| Best bowling | 1/24 | 4/31 | 7/17 | 5/24 |
| Catches/stumpings | 0/– | 24/– | 6/– | 67/– |
- Source: CricketArchive, 11 April 2021

Emily Cecilia Drumm MNZM (born 15 September 1974) is a New Zealand former cricketer who played as a right-handed batter and could bowl both right-arm medium and right-arm leg break. She appeared in 5 Test matches and 101 One Day Internationals for New Zealand between 1992 and 2006. She played domestic cricket for Auckland, Northern Districts and Kent.

Drumm captained New Zealand in 41 women's one-day internationals, winning 28 of them, losing 12 and with one no result. She captained New Zealand to their greatest ODI success - winning the 2000 Women's Cricket World Cup in 2000/2001.

Drumm's 815 runs at Bert Sutcliffe Oval, Lincoln is the second-highest amount of runs on a single ground in Women's ODI history.

Drumm holds the record for the highest individual score in Women's Test cricket history when batting at number 5 position or lower (161*).

In the 2006 New Year Honours, Drumm was appointed a Member of the New Zealand Order of Merit, for services to women's cricket. Following her playing career, Drumm worked for Canon and has also been a radio commentator.

== International centuries ==
Test centuries
| Runs | Match | Opponents | City | Venue | Year |
|---|---|---|---|---|---|
| 161* | 3 | Australia | Christchurch, New Zealand | Hagley Oval | 1995 |
| 112* | 5 | England | Guildford, England | Woodbridge Road | 1996 |

One Day International centuries
| Runs | Match | Opponents | City | Venue | Year |
|---|---|---|---|---|---|
| 116 | 57 | England | Oamaru, New Zealand | Whitestone Contracting Stadium | 2000 |
| 108* | 63 | South Africa | Lincoln, New Zealand | Lincoln Green | 2000 |

== See also ==
- List of centuries in women's One Day International cricket
- List of centuries in women's Test cricket
