= Lisa Keightley =

Australian former cricketer and current cricket coach

Personal information
- Full name: Lisa Maree Keightley
- Born: 26 August 1971 (age 55); Mudgee, New South Wales, Australia
- Batting: Right-handed
- Bowling: Right-arm medium
- Role: Batter; occasional wicket-keeper

International information
- National side: Australia (1995–2005)
- Test debut (cap 126): 28 February 1995 v New Zealand
- Last Test: 24 August 2005 v England
- ODI debut (cap 75): 14 February 1995 v New Zealand
- Last ODI: 1 September 2005 v England
- Only T20I (cap 7): 2 September 2005 v England

Domestic team information
- Years: Team
- 1992/93–2004/05: New South Wales
- 2009: Warwickshire
- 2010: Wiltshire
- 2012: Wiltshire

Head coaching information
- Years: Team
- 2005/06–2006/07: New South Wales
- 2007–2008: Australia
- 2015/16–2019/20: Western Australia
- 2015/16–2019/20: Perth Scorchers
- 2020–2022: England
- 2023/24–present: Sydney Thunder

Career statistics
| Competition | WTest | WODI | WT20I | WLA |
|---|---|---|---|---|
| Matches | 9 | 82 | 1 | 215 |
| Runs scored | 378 | 2,630 | 1 | 7,244 |
| Batting average | 27.00 | 39.84 | 1.00 | 39.36 |
| 100s/50s | 0/3 | 4/21 | 0/0 | 9/50 |
| Top score | 90 | 156* | 1 | 156* |
| Balls bowled | 30 | 150 | – | 1,569 |
| Wickets | 0 | 8 | – | 40 |
| Bowling average | – | 10.87 | – | 17.65 |
| 5 wickets in innings | – | 0 | – | 1 |
| 10 wickets in match | – | 0 | – | 0 |
| Best bowling | – | 4/19 | – | 5/18 |
| Catches/stumpings | 5/– | 27/2 | 0/1 | 68/2 |
- Source: CricketArchive, 6 January 2023

Lisa Maree Keightley (born 26 August 1971) is an Australian former cricketer and current cricket coach. She played primarily as a right-handed batter. She appeared in nine Test matches, 82 One Day Internationals and one Twenty20 International for Australia between 1995 and 2005. She played domestic cricket for New South Wales, as well as Warwickshire and Wiltshire.

Following her playing career, she became a coach, leading Australia, Perth Scorchers and England, among others.

== Career ==
Keightley played nine Tests and 85 One Day Internationals for the Australia women's national cricket team between 1995 and 2005 and represented New South Wales in the Women's National Cricket League from 1996/97 to 2004/05.

She holds the record for the highest ever maiden ton in Women's ODI history (156*)

She played 91 matches in the domestic national cricket league, scoring 3081 runs at 37.12 with 3 centuries, 21 fifties and a highest score of 144*. She also took 10 wickets at 27.6.

On 30 October 2019, Keightley was appointed head coach of the English women's team, the first woman to hold the post full-time. She had previously coached New South Wales, Australia women, Western Australia and Perth Scorchers, as well as leading the England Women's Academy. Keightley left the position at the end of England's 2022 home summer.

In December 2024, she was named as the new coach of the Northern Superchargers women's team.

In September 2025, she was named the new head coach of the Mumbai Indians after Charlotte Edwards resigned to become coach of the England team.

== One Day International centuries ==
Keightley scored four centuries in One Day International matches.

Lisa Keightley's One-Day International centuries
| No. | Runs | Opponents | Venue | Year |
|---|---|---|---|---|
| 1 | 156* | Pakistan | Wesley Cricket Ground, Melbourne, Australia | 1997 |
| 2 | 113* | England | Lord's, London, England | 1998 |
| 3 | 127* | England | Sydney Cricket Ground, Sydney, Australia | 2000 |
| 4 | 103 | South Africa | LC de Villiers Oval, Pretoria, South Africa | 2005 |
