= Julia Price =

Cricketer (b. 1972)

Personal information
- Full name: Julia Clare Price
- Batting: Right-handed
- Role: Wicket-keeper

International information
- National side: Australia
- Test debut (cap 133): 8 February 1996 v New Zealand
- Last Test: 24 August 2005 v England
- ODI debut (cap 79): 1 February 1996 v New Zealand
- Last ODI: 1 September 2005 v England

Career statistics
Competition	Test	ODI	FC	LA
Matches	10	84	18	219
Runs scored	114	365	175	2,980
Batting average	19.00	15.86	14.58	22.23
100s/50s	0/1	0/0	0/1	1/14
Top score	80*	38	80*	112*
Balls bowled	–	6	–	183
Wickets	–	0	–	6
Bowling average	–	–	–	25.00
5 wickets in innings	–	–	–	0
10 wickets in match	–	–	–	0
Best bowling	–	–	–	2/2
Catches/stumpings	20/2	70/30	31/8	168/60
- Source: Cricinfo, 6 June 2014

Julia Clare Price (born 11 January 1972) is a former cricketer for the Australian women's cricket team. She made her first-class debut in 1995 for Queensland Women and her Test debut against New Zealand at Melbourne in February 1996. Her last Test was against England at Worcester in 2005.

A right-handed batter she has scored 114 runs at Test level with her best innings an outstanding unbeaten 80 against England. A specialist wicket-keeper, she has taken 20 catches and completed two stumpings in Tests. Nine of her Tests have been in Ashes games against England, her other Test opponent being New Zealand.

She has played 84 One-day internationals for her country, scoring 365 runs at an average of 15.86 with her top score of 38 coming against the Ireland Women's team. She has also bowled one over in ODIs, without success. She was a member of the Australian teams which won the Women's Cricket World Cup in 1997, beating New Zealand, and 2005, beating the Indian team. She was a losing finalist in 2000 when New Zealand took the crown.

With the emergence of Jodie Purves as a young wicket keeper for Queensland Fire, Julia Price played as a specialist middle order batsman for her state. In 89 matches in the Women's National Cricket League she has scored 1,812 runs, with a best of 112* against Western Australia Women, at an average of 23.84. She has scored eight other fifties and taken 78 catches and completed 23 stumpings.

In March 2019, she was appointed as the head coach of the United States women's cricket team.
