= Joanne Broadbent =

Australian cricketer (born 1965)

Personal information
- Full name: Joanne Broadbent
- Born: 29 November 1965 (age 60); Woodville, South Australia
- Batting: Left-handed
- Bowling: Left-arm medium
- Role: All-rounder

International information
- National side: Australia (1990–2000)
- Test debut (cap 117): 18 January 1990 v New Zealand
- Last Test: 21 August 1998 v England
- ODI debut (cap 61): 6 February 1990 v New Zealand
- Last ODI: 10 December 2000 v England

Domestic team information
- Years: Team
- 1986/87–2000/01: South Australia
- 2002/03: Queensland

Career statistics
Competition	WTest	WODI	WFC	WLA
Matches	10	60	30	141
Runs scored	437	993	1,065	2,689
Batting average	109.25	28.37	62.64	30.55
100s/50s	1/2	0/6	3/5	1/13
Top score	200	85	200	103*
Balls bowled	1,177	1,359	3,071	4,154
Wickets	13	38	39	114
Bowling average	23.15	16.47	22.28	16.65
5 wickets in innings	0	1	2	2
10 wickets in match	0	0	0	0
Best bowling	3/34	5/10	6/23	5/10
Catches/stumpings	2/–	14/–	5/–	40/–
- Source: CricketArchive, 1 January 2023

Joanne Broadbent OAM (born 29 November 1965) is an Australian former cricketer who played as an all-rounder, batting left-handed and bowling left-arm medium. She appeared in 10 Test matches and 60 One Day Internationals for Australia between 1990 and 2000. In August 1998, she scored 200 in a Test match against England, and took one ODI five-wicket haul, 5/10 against New Zealand in 1993. She played domestic cricket for South Australia and Queensland.

Broadbent received the Medal of the Order of Australia (OAM) in the 2018 Queen's Birthday Honours for service to cricket.
