= Kathryn Ramel =

New Zealand cricketer (born 1973)

Personal information
- Full name: Kathryn Ann Ramel
- Born: 7 September 1973 (age 53); Auckland, New Zealand
- Batting: Right-handed
- Bowling: Right-arm medium
- Role: Bowler

International information
- National side: New Zealand (1997–2002)
- ODI debut (cap 73): 5 November 1997 v Australia
- Last ODI: 11 July 2002 v India

Domestic team information
- Years: Team
- 1990/91–2001/02: Auckland

Career statistics
Competition	WODI	WFC	WLA
Matches	47	15	133
Runs scored	519	266	2,037
Batting average	17.30	14.77	19.21
100s/50s	0/0	0/0	0/7
Top score	41	40	92
Balls bowled	1,226	468	3,745
Wickets	35	13	112
Bowling average	20.82	20.92	19.70
5 wickets in innings	0	0	0
10 wickets in match	0	0	0
Best bowling	3/26	3/24	4/33
Catches/stumpings	13/–	2/–	43/–
- Source: CricketArchive, 21 July 2021

Kathryn Ann Ramel (born 7 September 1973) is a New Zealand former cricketer who played primarily as a right-arm medium bowler. She appeared in 47 One Day Internationals for New Zealand between 1997 and 2002. She played domestic cricket for Auckland. Following her playing career, Ramel became a teacher, and later a principal, at a school in Auckland.
