= Avril Fahey =

Australian cricketer

Personal information
- Full name: Avril Joy Fahey
- Born: 24 June 1974 (age 52)
- Batting: Right-handed
- Bowling: Right-arm off-spin

International information
- National side: Australia
- Test debut (cap 130): 28 February 1995 v New Zealand
- Last Test: 6 July 2001 v England
- ODI debut (cap 81): 7 February 1997 v Pakistan
- Last ODI: 1 September 2001 v Ireland

Career statistics
Competition	Test	ODI	FC	LA
Matches	6	40	11	186
Runs scored	11	28	29	1,668
Batting average	11.00	9.33	5.80	15.06
100s/50s	0/0	0/0	0/0	0/5
Top score	11	12*	11	62*
Balls bowled	864	1,623	1,350	7,950
Wickets	5	37	11	154
Bowling average	58.00	21.94	43.72	28.56
5 wickets in innings	0	0	0	1
10 wickets in match	0	0	0	0
Best bowling	2/37	3/11	2/28	5/8
Catches/stumpings	1/–	5/–	3/–	46/–
- Source: Cricinfo, 7 June 2014

Avril Fahey (born 24 June 1974) is a former Australian cricket player.

Fahey first played for the Western Australian women's cricket team in the 1992–93 cricket season. She played for Western Australia between 1992 and 2012. She played 164 domestic limited overs matches including 124 Women's National Cricket League matches and 32 Women's Twenty20 games for the Western Fury.

Fahey played six Tests and 40 One Day Internationals for the Australia national women's cricket team.

Fahey retired from cricket in 2012. She captained the Western Fury in 45 matches and was the first woman to play 150 matches for Western Australia.

As of July 2024, Fahey is the chair of the WACA Board.
