= Cathryn Fitzpatrick =

Australian cricketer

Personal information
- Full name: Cathryn Lorraine Fitzpatrick
- Born: 4 March 1968 (age 58); Melbourne, Australia
- Batting: Right-handed
- Bowling: Right-arm fast

International information
- National side: Australia (1991–2007)
- Test debut (cap 121): 2 February 1991 v India
- Last Test: 18 February 2006 v India
- ODI debut (cap 71): 24 July 1993 v West Indies
- Last ODI: 4 February 2006 v New Zealand
- T20I debut (cap 5): 2 September 2005 v England
- Last T20I: 18 October 2006 v New Zealand

Domestic team information
- Years: Team
- 1989/90–2006/07: Victoria

Career statistics
Competition	WTest	WODI	WT20I	WLA
Matches	13	109	2	244
Runs scored	152	651	–	1,970
Batting average	16.88	16.69	–	17.58
100s/50s	0/1	0/0	–	0/1
Top score	53	43	–	56
Balls bowled	3,603	6,017	48	13,136
Wickets	60	180	0	358
Bowling average	19.11	16.79	–	17.53
5 wickets in innings	2	4	–	5
10 wickets in match	0	0	–	0
Best bowling	5/29	5/14	–	6/22
Catches/stumpings	5/–	25/–	1/–	50/–
Medal record
Women's Cricket
Representing Australia
ICC Women's Cricket World Cup
Winner	1997 India
Runner-up	2000 New Zealand
Winner	2005 South Africa
- Source: CricketArchive, 25 November 2022

Cathryn Lorraine Fitzpatrick (born 4 March 1968) is an Australian former cricketer. She was recognised as the world's fastest female bowler throughout her career and became the first woman to take 100 One Day International wickets. She appeared in 13 Test matches, 109 One Day Internationals and two Twenty20 Internationals for Australia between 1991 and 2007. She played domestic cricket for Victoria. In 2019, Fitzpatrick was inducted into both the Australian Cricket Hall of Fame and the ICC Cricket Hall of Fame.

== Career summary ==
While juggling her full-time job as a waste collector and later a postwoman, Fitzpatrick represented Australia in cricket on 124 occasions. She made her international debut in 1991 and went on to play 13 Test matches, taking 60 wickets (the second-most by an Australian woman, only behind Betty Wilson) at an average of 19.11.

Fitzpatrick also played 109 One Day Internationals, taking 180 wickets (the most by any woman until surpassed by Jhulan Goswami in May 2017) at an average of 16.79. She was a member of the Australian team that won the Women's Cricket World Cup in 1997 and 2005.

On 25 February 2006, Fitzpatrick became the oldest woman to take a five-wicket haul in ODI history, at the age of 37 years and 358 days. In March 2007, she announced her retirement from international cricket and also brought her domestic career with Victoria to an end after taking 148 wickets in 103 WNCL matches.

From May 2012 to March 2015, Fitzpatrick served as head coach of the Australian women's team, overseeing three successful world championship campaigns.

In 2019, Fitzpatrick was inducted into the Australian Cricket Hall of Fame. Later that year, she was inducted into the ICC Cricket Hall of Fame.

== Bowling speed ==
Due to limitations of technological resources in her playing tenure, Fitzpatrick's top and average speeds are estimates rather than precise figures. Thorough eye-witness testimony agrees she was the world's fastest female bowler during her prime years, while sporadic measurements indicated her quickest delivery was at least 125 km/h. This evaluation holds up both impressively and credibly compared with modern women's cricket, which is characterised by increased professional standards - as of 2019, the fastest current bowlers were South Africa's Shabnim Ismail and New Zealand's Lea Tahuhu, who were officially recorded at speeds of 128 km/h and 126 km/h respectively.

== Honours ==
=== Team ===
- 2x Women's Cricket World Cup champion: 1997, 2005
- 2x Women's National Cricket League champion: 2002–03, 2004–05

=== Individual ===
- Belinda Clark Award winner: 2004
