= Charmaine Mason =

Australian cricketer (born 1970)

Personal information
- Full name: Charmaine Lea Mason
- Born: 20 September 1970 (age 56); Sutherland, Sydney, Australia
- Batting: Right-handed
- Bowling: Right-arm fast
- Role: Bowler

International information
- National side: Australia (1992–2001)
- Test debut (cap 124): 19 February 1992 v England
- Last Test: 6 July 2001 v England
- ODI debut (cap 83): 7 February 1997 v Pakistan
- Last ODI: 15 July 2001 v Ireland

Domestic team information
- Years: Team
- 1989/90–2000/01: Victoria

Career statistics
Competition	WTest	WODI	WFC	WLA
Matches	5	46	13	109
Runs scored	0	66	80	318
Batting average	–	6.00	16.00	7.22
100s/50s	0/0	0/0	0/0	0/0
Top score	0*	11*	49	47
Balls bowled	1,063	2,366	1,900	5,670
Wickets	13	83	25	165
Bowling average	26.07	13.85	24.96	14.86
5 wickets in innings	0	2	0	2
10 wickets in match	0	0	0	0
Best bowling	4/40	5/9	4/40	5/9
Catches/stumpings	0/–	16/–	0/–	29/–
- Source: CricketArchive, 14 January 2022

Charmaine Lea Mason (born 20 September 1970) is an Australian former cricketer who played as a right-arm fast bowler. She appeared in 5 Test matches and 46 One Day Internationals for Australia between 1992 and 2001. She played domestic cricket for Victoria.

Charmaine made her first class debut for Victoria in 1989/90 where she began to form a combination of speed with opening bowler partner Cathryn Fitzpatrick. Fiztpatrick's raw pace was complemented by Mason's skills.

Mason made her Australia Test debut in 1990/91 against England at North Sydney Oval. Her first wicket, the England captain, Helen Plimmer. Her next one, former England captain, Carole Hodges. She collected 4-40 and 3–39 to complete an excellent debut with the ball. In five Test matches Mason had one innings, 0*. More importantly, 13 Test wickets at 26.07.

A debut in ODIs came in 1996/7 and it is in this format where Mason really excelled. (Not with the bat) In 46 matches, 83 wickets at the miserly rate of just 13.85, an economy of 2.91 (Still World Class to this day) and best performance of 5–9. Charmaine Mason was also part of the World Cup winning team in 1997.

With many years still left in her career, Charmaine retired from cricket unexpectedly in 2001 at age 31 to further her career away from sport. She has resided in the United Kingdom since 2001.
