= 1990 Women's European Cricket Cup =

- Dates: 18 – 22 July 1990
- Cricket format: ODI (55-over)
- Tournament format: Round-robin
- Host: England
- Champions: England (2nd title)
- Participants: 4
- Matches: 7
- Most runs: (England) Wendy Watson (229)
- Most wickets: (Ireland) Susan Bray (8)

The 1990 Women's European Cricket Cup was an international cricket tournament held in England from 18 to 22 July 1990. It was the second edition of the Women's European Championship, and all matches at the tournament held One Day International (ODI) status.

Four teams participated, with the hosts, England, joined by the three other European members of the International Women's Cricket Council (IWCC) – Denmark, Ireland, and the Netherlands. A round-robin format was used, with the top teams proceeding to the final. England was undefeated in the round-robin stage and beat Ireland by 65 runs in the final, winning the championship for a second consecutive time. England's Wendy Watson led the tournament in runs for a second year running, while Ireland's Susan Bray was the leading wicket-taker. The tournament was hosted by East Midlands Women's Cricket Association, a member of England's Women's Cricket Association, and matches were played at venues in three English counties (Leicestershire, Northamptonshire, and Nottinghamshire).

== Squads ==
Denmark	England Coach: Ruth Prideaux	Ireland Coach: Joseph Caprani	Netherlands Coach: Marc Nota
Janni Jønsson (c); Trine Christiansen; Mette Frost; Mette Gregersen; Lene Hansen; Heidi Jensen; Jane Jensen; Heidi Kjaer; Betina Langerhuus; Susanne Nielsen; Vibeke Nielsen; Lene Slebsager; Charlotte Smith; Linda Sorensen	Jane Powell (c); Caroline Barrs; Jo Chamberlain; Cathy Cooke; Alison Elder; Carole Hodges; Debra Maybury; Susan Metcalfe; Lisa Nye; Gillian Smith; Karen Smithies; Clare Taylor; Janet Tedstone; Wendy Watson	Elizabeth Owens (c); Donna Armstrong; Terri Bennett; Susan Bray; Miriam Grealey; Rachel Hardiman; Judith Herbison; Anne Linehan; Julie Logue; Gillian McCall; Mary-Pat Moore; Anne Murray; Stella Owens; Saibh Young	Ingrid Keijzer (c); Hilone Dinnissen; Chantal Grevers; Jiska Howard; Edmee Janss; Dorine Loman; Nicola Payne; Irene Schoof; Pauline te Beest; Jet van Noortwijk; Karen van Rijn; Esther Veltman; Angela Venturini; Vanda Wesenhagen

== Round-robin ==
=== Points table ===
Team	Pld	W	L	T	NR	Pts	RR
England	3	3	0	0	0	6	4.312
Ireland	3	2	1	0	0	4	3.828
Netherlands	3	1	2	0	0	2	2.588
Denmark	3	0	3	0	0	0	2.848

Source: CricketArchive

=== Fixtures ===
18 July
Scorecard

Ireland; 234/4 (55 overs)	v	Denmark; 185/8 (55 overs)

Ireland won by 49 runs
Leicester Ivanhoe Cricket Club, Kirby Muxloe

- Denmark won the toss and elected to bowl.

18 July
Scorecard

Netherlands; 57 (33 overs)	v	England; 58/2 (19.5 overs)

England won by 8 wickets
Aylestone Road, Leicester

- Netherlands won the toss and elected to bat.

19 July
Scorecard

England; 270/5 (54 overs)	v	Denmark; 64 (24.3 overs)

England won by 206 runs
John Player Ground, Nottinghamshire

- Denmark won the toss and elected to bowl.
- England's Gillian Smith took 5/15, the best bowling figures of the tournament.

19 July
Scorecard

Ireland; 198/4 (50 overs)	v	Netherlands; 172/9 (50 overs)

Ireland won by 26 runs
John Player Ground, Nottinghamshire

- Netherlands won the toss and elected to bowl.
- The match was reduced to 50 overs per side.

20 July
Scorecard

Netherlands; 123/7 (53 overs)	v	Denmark; 89 (39.1 overs)

Denmark won by 34 runs
Aylestone Road, Leicester

- Denmark won the toss and elected to bowl.
- The match was reduced to 53 overs per side.

20 July
Scorecard

Ireland; 169/9 (52 overs)	v	England; 170/1 (41.4 overs)

England won by 9 wickets
Leicester Ivanhoe Cricket Club, Kirby Muxloe

- England won the toss and elected to bowl.
- The match was reduced to 52 overs per side.

== Final ==
22 July
Scorecard

England; 224/3 (55 overs)	v	Ireland; 159/8 (55 overs)
Wendy Watson 107* (168); Anne Linehan 1/31 (5 overs)		Mary-Pat Moore 44 (125); Clare Taylor 2/7 (8 overs)

England won by 65 runs
Great Oakley Cricket Club, Great Oakley

- England won the toss and elected to bat.
- England's Wendy Watson made 107 not out, the highest score (and only century) of the tournament.

== Statistics ==
=== Most runs ===
The top five run scorers (total runs) are included in this table.

Player	Team	Runs	Inns	Avg	Highest	100s	50s
Wendy Watson	England	229	3	229.00	107*	1	1
Jane Powell	England	171	4	85.50	98*	0	1
Mary-Pat Moore	Ireland	169	4	42.25	99	0	1
Anne Murray	Ireland	113	4	28.25	61	0	1
Stella Owens	Ireland	103	2	103.00	84*	0	1

Source: CricketArchive

=== Most wickets ===
The top five wicket takers are listed in this table, listed by wickets taken and then by bowling average.

Player	Team	Overs	Wkts	Ave	SR	Econ	BBI
Susan Bray	Ireland	44.0	8	12.25	33.00	2.22	5/27
Ingrid Dulfer	Netherlands	24.0	7	6.00	20.57	1.75	4/14
Gillian Smith	England	33.3	7	11.28	28.71	2.35	5/15
Clare Taylor	England	32.0	6	9.16	32.00	1.71	2/7
Janet Tedstone	England	21.0	6	11.50	21.00	3.28	4/35

Source: CricketArchive
