= 1989 Women's European Cricket Cup =

- Dates: 19 – 21 July 1989
- Cricket format: ODI (55-over)
- Tournament format: Round-robin
- Host: Denmark
- Champions: England (1st title)
- Participants: 4
- Matches: 6
- Player of the series: (England) Jo Chamberlain
- Most runs: (England) Wendy Watson (124)
- Most wickets: (England) Jo Chamberlain (10)

The 1989 Women's European Cricket Cup was an international cricket tournament held in Denmark from 19 to 21 July 1989. It was the first edition of the Women's European Championship, and all matches at the tournament held One Day International (ODI) status.

Four teams participated, with the hosts, Denmark, joined by the three other European members of the International Women's Cricket Council (IWCC) – England, Ireland, and the Netherlands. Denmark was making its ODI debut. The tournament was played using a round-robin format, with England finishing undefeated in its three matches. Two English players, Wendy Watson and Jo Chamberlain, led the tournament in runs and wickets, respectively. All matches were played at the Nykøbing Mors Cricket Club, located in the town of Nykøbing Mors.

== Squads ==
| Denmark | England | Ireland | Netherlands |
|---|---|---|---|
| Lene Slebsager (c); Trine Christiansen; Charlotte Corneliussen; Anne-Mette Fernandes; Janni Jønsson; Susanne Jorgensen; Lene Hansen; Betina Langerhuus; Lilli Laursen; Susanne Nielsen; Vibeke Nielsen; Charlotte Smith | Jane Powell (c); Caroline Barrs; Jo Chamberlain; Cathy Cooke; Julie Crump; Suzie Kitson; Debra Maybury; Susan Metcalfe; Lisa Nye; Helen Plimmer; Gillian Smith; Clare Taylor; Wendy Watson | Elizabeth Owens (c); Donna Armstrong; Susan Bray; Miriam Grealey; Helen Hearnden; Anne Linehan; Anne-Marie McDonald; Collette McGuinness; Julie Logue; Mary-Pat Moore; Anne Murray; Stella Owens; Janice Walsh | Ingrid Keijzer (c); Cornelia Eveleens; Chantal Grevers; Edmee Janss; Leine Loman; Geeske Ludwig; Nicola Payne; Jet van Noortwijk; Karen van Rijn; Babette van Teunenbroek; Esther Veltman; Angela Venturini; Vanda Wesenhagen |

== Points table ==
| Team | Pld | W | L | T | NR | Pts | RR |
|---|---|---|---|---|---|---|---|
| England | 3 | 3 | 0 | 0 | 0 | 6 | 3.361 |
| Denmark | 3 | 1 | 2 | 0 | 0 | 2 | 2.286 |
| Netherlands | 3 | 1 | 2 | 0 | 0 | 2 | 2.092 |
| Ireland | 3 | 1 | 2 | 0 | 0 | 2 | 2.019 |

Source: CricketArchive

== Fixtures ==
19 July
Scorecard

| Denmark; 120/9 (55 overs) | v | Ireland; 121/3 (51.5 overs) |

Ireland won by 7 wickets
Nykøbing Mors Cricket Club

- Ireland won the toss and elected to bowl.
- Denmark made its debut in One Day International matches.

19 July
Scorecard

| Netherlands; 91/7 (55 overs) | v | England; 92/3 (31.1 overs) |

England won by 7 wickets
Nykøbing Mors Cricket Club

- England won the toss and elected to bowl.

20 July
Scorecard

| England; 197/6 (51 overs) | v | Denmark; 93/9 (51 overs) |

England won by 104 runs
Nykøbing Mors Cricket Club

- Denmark won the toss and elected to bowl.
- The match was reduced to 51 overs per side.
- England's Wendy Watson scored 90 not out, the highest score of the tournament.

20 July
Scorecard

| Ireland; 110/9 (55 overs) | v | Netherlands; 114/6 (53.4 overs) |

Netherlands won by 4 wickets
Nykøbing Mors Cricket Club

- Ireland won the toss and elected to bowl.

21 July
Scorecard

| Denmark; 155/7 (55 overs) | v | Netherlands; 135 (53.5 overs) |

Denmark won by 20 runs
Nykøbing Mors Cricket Club

- Netherlands won the toss and elected to bowl.

21 July
Scorecard

| England; 172/6 (55 overs) | v | Ireland; 93 (53.4 overs) |

England won by 79 runs
Nykøbing Mors Cricket Club

- Ireland won the toss and elected to bowl.
- England's Jo Chamberlain took 5/18, the best bowling figures of the tournament.

== Statistics ==
=== Most runs ===
The top five run scorers (total runs) are included in this table.

| Player | Team | Runs | Inns | Avg | Highest | 100s | 50s |
|---|---|---|---|---|---|---|---|
| Wendy Watson | England | 124 | 2 | 124.00 | 90* | 0 | 1 |
| Anne Murray | Ireland | 104 | 3 | 52.00 | 60* | 0 | 1 |
| Helen Plimmer | England | 85 | 3 | 28.33 | 54 | 0 | 1 |
| Jane Powell | England | 77 | 3 | 25.66 | 32 | 0 | 0 |
| Jet van Noortwijk | Netherlands | 73 | 3 | 36.50 | 46* | 0 | 0 |

Source: CricketArchive

=== Most wickets ===
The top five wicket takers are listed in this table, listed by wickets taken and then by bowling average.

| Player | Team | Overs | Wkts | Ave | SR | Econ | BBI |
|---|---|---|---|---|---|---|---|
| Jo Chamberlain | England | 27.4 | 10 | 4.50 | 16.60 | 1.62 | 5/18 |
| Janni Jønsson | Denmark | 32.0 | 7 | 11.85 | 27.42 | 2.59 | 4/38 |
| Debra Maybury | England | 28.0 | 6 | 7.00 | 28.00 | 1.50 | 2/7 |
| Ingrid Dulfer | Netherlands | 27.0 | 6 | 8.16 | 27.00 | 1.81 | 4/20 |
| Lene Hansen | Denmark | 31.4 | 6 | 18.33 | 31.66 | 3.47 | 4/27 |

Source: CricketArchive
