= England women's cricket team in Ireland in 1990 =

English women's cricket team in Ireland in 1990
	Ireland	England
- Dates: 16 – 17 August 1990
Captains	Elizabeth Owens	Karen Smithies

One Day International series
- Results: England won the 2-match series 2–0
Most runs	Judith Herbison (28)	Debra Maybury (64)
Most wickets	Susan Bray (4)	Gill Smith (5); Suzanne Kitson (5)

The England women's cricket team toured Ireland in August 1990. They played Ireland in two One Day Internationals, both of which were won by England.

== Squads ==
Ireland	England
Elizabeth Owens (c); Donna Armstrong; Terri Bennett; Susan Bray; Miriam Grealey; Rachel Hardiman; Judith Herbison; Anne Linehan; Gillian McCall; Mary-Pat Moore; Anne Murray (wk); Alice Stanton; Saibh Young	Karen Smithies (c); Linda Burnley; Jo Chamberlain; Sarah-Jane Cook; Cathy Cooke; Alison Elder (wk); Carole Hodges; Suzanne Kitson; Debra Maybury; Sue Metcalfe; Gill Smith; Clare Taylor

== WODI Series ==
=== 1st ODI ===
16 August 1990
Scorecard

England; 156/9 (55 overs)	v	Ireland; 94 (45.1 overs)
Sue Metcalfe 30 (87); Susan Bray 4/25 (11 overs)		Anne Linehan 21 (43); Gill Smith 3/12 (11 overs)

England Women won by 62 runs
Castle Avenue, Dublin
Umpires: Billy Savage (Eng) and Don Geraghty (Eng)

- Ireland Women won the toss and elected to field.
- Linda Burnley (Eng) made her WODI debut.

=== 2nd ODI ===
17 August 1990
Scorecard

Ireland; 79 (40.1 overs)	v	England; 80/0 (21.2 overs)
Judith Herbison 20 (34); Gill Smith 2/0 (5 overs)		Alison Elder 37* (62)

England Women won by 10 wickets
Observatory Lane, Dublin
Umpires: Dermot Condon (Eng) and Tommy Thompson (Eng)

- England Women won the toss and elected to field.
- Sarah-Jane Cook (Eng) made her WODI debut.
