= Australia women's cricket team in Ireland in 1987 =

Cricket tour

Australian women's cricket team in Ireland in 1987
	Ireland	Australia
- Dates: 28 June – 2 July 1987
Captains	Mary-Pat Moore	Lyn Larsen

One Day International series
- Results: Australia won the 3-match series 3–0
Most runs	Mary-Pat Moore (57)	Lindsay Reeler (167)
Most wickets	Susan Bray (4)	Karen Brown (9)

The Australian women's cricket team toured Ireland between 28 June to 2 July 1987 to contest a three match WODI series. In this, Ireland's debut WODI series, Australia won each match by a margin of more than 100 runs.

== ODI series ==
=== 1st ODI ===
28 June 1987
Scorecard

Australia; 2/187 (55 overs)	v	Ireland; 77 (47.2 overs)
Lindsay Reeler 83 (159)		Mary-Pat Moore 21 (74); Karen Brown 3/16 (10.2 overs)

Australia Women won by 110 runs
Ormeau Cricket Ground, Belfast

- Australia Women won the toss and elected to bat.
- Donna Armstrong, Susan Bray, Grainne Clancy, Miriam Grealey, Rachel Hardiman, Mary-Pat Moore, Anne Murray, Elizabeth Owens, Sonia Reamsbottom, Alice Stanton and Pamela Trohear (Ire) all made their women's ODI debut.
- Anne Murray became the first Irish batsman to be dismissed in a women's ODI match.
- Alice Stanton became the first Irish batsman to score a duck in a women's ODI match.

=== 2nd ODI ===
1 July 1987
Scorecard

Australia; 5/204 (55 overs)	v	Ireland; 81 (47.2 overs)
Ruth Buckstein 90 (140); Susan Bray 2/25 (11 overs)		Mary-Pat Moore 26 (85); Jenny Owens 5/29 (10.2 overs)

Australia Women won by 123 runs
College Park, Dublin

- Australia Women won the toss and elected to bat.
- Stella Owens (Ire) made her women's ODI debut.
- Susan Bray became the first bowler to take a wicket for Ireland in a women's ODI match.

=== 3rd ODI ===
2 July 1987
Scorecard

Australia; 3/208 (55 overs)	v	Ireland; 103 (54.1 overs)
Lindsay Reeler 84 (143); Susan Bray 2/14 (11 overs)		Sonia Reamsbottom 31 (97); Karen Brown 4/24 (11 overs)

Australia Women won by 105 runs
College Park, Dublin

- Ireland Women won the toss and elected to field.
