= 1988 Women's Cricket World Cup =

1988 Women's World Cup
- Dates: 29 November – 18 December 1988
- Administrator: International Women's Cricket Council
- Cricket format: Women's One Day International (60-over)
- Tournament format(s): Double round-robin Playoffs
- Host: Australia
- Champions: Australia (3rd title)
- Runners-up: England
- Participants: 5
- Matches: 22
- Player of the series: (England) Carole Hodges
- Most runs: (Australia) Lindsay Reeler (448)
- Most wickets: (Australia) Lyn Fullston (16)

The 1988 Women's Cricket World Cup, also known as 1988 Shell Bicentennial Women's World Cup, was an international cricket tournament played in Australia from 29 November to 18 December 1988. Hosted by Australia for the first time, as part of the Bicentenary celebrations, it was the fourth edition of the Women's Cricket World Cup, and came six years after the preceding 1982 World Cup in New Zealand.

The tournament was organised by the International Women's Cricket Council (IWCC), with matches played over 60 overs. Australia won the tournament for a third consecutive time, defeating England in the final by eight wickets. New Zealand defeated Ireland in the third-place playoff, while the Netherlands, the only other team at the tournament, placed fifth and last after failing to win a single match. Both Ireland and the Netherlands were making their tournament debuts. India had been invited to compete, as they had at the previous two tournaments, but were forced to withdraw after failing to secure enough money from sponsors. Two Australians, Lindsay Reeler and Lyn Fullston, led the tournament in runs and wickets, respectively. The player of the series was English all-rounder Carole Hodges, who placed third for runs scored and second for wickets taken. She received a Waterford Crystal trophy valued at A$4,000, donated by an Irish firm, R&A Bailey.

== Squads ==
Australia	England	Ireland Coach: Noel Mahony	Netherlands	New Zealand Coach: Dayle Hadlee
Lyn Larsen (c); Denise Annetts; Karen Brown; Ruth Buckstein; Lyn Fullston; Zoe Goss; Sally Griffiths; Belinda Haggett; Sharlene Heywood; Lee-Anne Hunter; Christina Matthews; Lindsay Reeler; Kerry Saunders; Sharon Tredrea	Jane Powell (c); Caroline Barrs; Janette Brittin; Jo Chamberlain; Carole Hodges; Suzie Kitson; Patsy Lovell; Debra Maybury; Lisa Nye; Gillian Smith; Karen Smithies; Clare Taylor; Janet Tedstone; Wendy Watson	Mary-Pat Moore (c); Donna Armstrong; Susan Bray; Grainne Clancy; Helen Hearnden; Julie Logue; Anne-Marie McDonald; Collette McGuinness; Anne Murray; Elizabeth Owens; Stella Owens; Sonia Reamsbottom; Gwynneth Smith; Janice Walsh	Anita van Lier (c); Hilone Dinnissen; Cornelia Eveleens; Chantal Grevers; Ingrid Keijzer; Dorine Loman; Nicola Payne; Irene Schoof; Isabelle van Dishoeck; Babette van Teunenbroek; Esther Veltman; Angela Venturini; Liesbeth Vernout; Vanda Wesenhagen	Lesley Murdoch (c); Kirsty Bond; Catherine Campbell*; Jackie Clark; Debbie Ford; Karen Gunn; Debbie Hockley; Sarah Illingworth; Ingrid Jagersma; Brigit Legg; Sue Morris; Jennifer Turner; Nicki Turner; Nancy Williams*

- Note: New Zealand's Nancy Williams dislocated her shoulder in one of the opening match, and was replaced by Catherine Campbell in the squad.

== Venues ==
Seven venues hosted matches at the 1988 Women's World Cup:
- Willetton Sports Club, Perth – four matches
- North Sydney Oval, Sydney – five matches
- Manuka Oval, Canberra – one match
- Carey Baptist Grammar School, Melbourne – seven matches
- Albert Cricket Ground, Melbourne – two matches
- Richmond Cricket Ground, Melbourne – two matches, including the third-place playoff
- Melbourne Cricket Ground, Melbourne – one match (the final)

== Warm-up matches ==
At least five warm-up matches were played against Australian state and invitational teams, which were interspersed throughout the tournament.

Warm-up matches

6 December
Scorecard

New South Wales; 215/9 (60 overs)	v	Ireland; 164 (? overs)

New South Wales won by 51 runs
North Sydney Oval (No. 2 Oval)

- New South Wales won the toss and elected to bat.

9 December
Scorecard

England; 115 (? overs)	v	(Victoria (state)) Victoria; 96 (? overs)

England won by 19 runs
Carey Baptist Grammar School (No. 2 Oval), Melbourne

- Victoria won the toss and elected to bowl.

13 December
Scorecard

Australia; 203/6 (60 overs)	v	(Victoria (state)) Victoria; 118/8 (60 overs)

Australia won by 85 runs
Carey Baptist Grammar School (No. 3 Oval), Melbourne

- Victoria won the toss and elected to bowl.

13 December
Scorecard

Victoria Under-21s (Victoria (state)); 236/6 (60 overs)	v	Ireland ?

Victoria Under-21s won by an unknown margin
Carey Baptist Grammar School (No. 3 Oval), Melbourne

- Victoria Under-21s won the toss and elected to bat.

13 December
Scorecard

VWCA President's XI (Victoria (state)); 81 (? overs)	v	New Zealand; 82/2 (? overs)

New Zealand won by 8 wickets
Carey Baptist Grammar School (No. 3 Oval), Melbourne

- VWCA President's XI won the toss and elected to bat.

== Group stage ==
=== Points table ===
Team	Pld	W	L	T	NR	Pts	RR
Australia	8	7	1	0	0	28	3.630
England	8	6	2	0	0	24	3.097
New Zealand	8	5	3	0	0	20	3.418
Ireland	8	2	6	0	0	8	1.965
Netherlands	8	0	8	0	0	0	1.695
Source: CricketArchive

- Note: run rate was to be used as a tiebreaker in the case of teams finishing on an equal number of points, rather than net run rate (as is now common).

== Matches ==
=== 1st Match ===
29 November
Scorecard

Australia; 284/1 (60 overs)	v	Netherlands; 29 (25.1 overs)
Lindsay Reeler 143 *		Anita van Lier 12; Karen Brown 4/4 (8 overs)

Australia won by 255 runs
Willetton Sports Club (No. 1 Oval), Perth

- Australia won the toss and elected to bat.
- Australia's Lindsay Reeler, who scored 143 not out, broke the record for the highest individual score in an ODI, which had been set by England's Janette Brittin at the 1982 World Cup. It was not beaten until February 1997.
- Australia broke the record for the largest winning margin (by runs) in an ODI match, which had been set by New Zealand at the 1982 World Cup. It was not beaten until January 1997.
- Australia also broke the record for the highest score in an ODI match, although it was beaten less than a week later, when New Zealand scored 297/5 against the same team.
- The Netherlands broke the record for the lowest score in an ODI match, which had been set by India at the 1982 World Cup. It was not beaten until February 1997.
- Angela Batenberg-Venturini, Cornelia Eveleens, Hilone Dinnissen, Ingrid Keyzer, Isabelle Koppe-van Dishoek and Nicola Payne (NED) all made their WODI debut.

=== 2nd Match ===
29 November
Scorecard

New Zealand; 232/4 (60 overs)	v	Ireland; 78/9 (60 overs)
Debbie Hockley 78; Mary-Pat Moore 2/24 (10 overs)		Stella Owens 23; Jennifer Turner 2/12 (9 overs)

New Zealand won by 154 runs
Willetton Sports Club (No. 2 Oval), Perth

- New Zealand won the toss and elected to bat.
- Anne-Marie Garth, Collette McGuiness, Gwynneth Smith (IRE), Jennifer Turner, Kirsty Bond, Sarah Illingworth and Sue Morris (NZ) all made their WODI debut.

=== 3rd Match ===
30 November
Scorecard

New Zealand; 186 (59.3 overs)	v	England; 187/7 (58.2 overs)
Debbie Hockley 81; Janette Brittin 3/16 (6.3 overs)		Jo Chamberlain 47*; Karen Gunn 2/26 (12 overs)

England won by 3 wickets
Willetton Sports Club (No. 1 Oval), Perth

- New Zealand won the toss and elected to bat.
- Debbie Ford (NZ), Debra Maybury, Lisa Nye and Suzanne Kitson (ENG) all made their WODI debut.

=== 4th Match ===
30 November
Scorecard

Ireland; 196/5 (60 overs)	v	Netherlands; 110/7 (60 overs)
Stella Owens 66; Esther Veltman 2/32 (12 overs)		Vanda Wesenhagen 41*; Stella Owens 2/8 (7 overs)

Ireland won by 86 runs
Willetton Sports Club (No. 2 Oval), Perth

- Netherlands won the toss and elected to bowl.
- Esther Veltman, Vanda Wesenhagen (NED), Janice Walsh and Julie Logue (IRE) all made their WODI debut.

=== 5th Match ===
3 December
Scorecard

Australia; 210 (60 overs)	v	England; 84/8 (60 overs)
Sharon Tredrea 69; Janet Tedstone 3/30 (12 overs); Caroline Barrs 3/30 (8 overs)		Jane Powell 36*; Karen Brown 2/11 (12 overs)

Australia won by 126 runs
North Sydney Oval, Sydney

- England won the toss and elected to bowl.
- Caroline Barrs (ENG) made her WODI debut.

=== 6th Match ===
4 December
Scorecard

Ireland; 78/8 (60 overs)	v	Australia; 81/0 (20.4 overs)
Mary-Pat Moore 28; Karen Brown 3/5 (12 overs)		Lindsay Reeler 41*

Australia won by 10 wickets
North Sydney Oval, Sydney

- Australia won the toss and elected to bowl.

=== 7th Match ===
4 December
Scorecard

New Zealand; 297/5 (60 overs)	v	Netherlands; 87 (51 overs)
Nicki Turner 114; Angela Batenberg-Venturini 2/59 (12 overs)		Anita van Lier 36; Catherine Campbell 3/27 (12 overs)

New Zealand won by 210 runs
North Sydney Oval (No. 2 Oval), Sydney

- Netherlands won the toss and elected to bowl.
- New Zealand broke the record for the highest score in an ODI match, which had been set less than a week earlier, by Australia against the same team. It was not beaten until January 1997.
- Catherine Campbell (NZ) made her WODI debut.

=== 8th Match ===
5 December
Scorecard

Ireland; 126 (57.5 overs)	v	England; 127/3 (43.3 overs)
Anne Murray 58; Caroline Barrs 4/23 (11.5 overs)		Carole Hodges 43; Anne-Marie Garth 1/22 (9 overs); Elizabeth Owens 1/22 (12 overs)

England won by 7 wickets
North Sydney Oval, Sydney

- England won the toss and elected to bowl.
- Clare Taylor (ENG) and Helen Hearnden (IRE) made their WODI debut.

=== 9th Match ===
6 December
Scorecard

Netherlands; 97 (60 overs)	v	England; 98/1 (29.3 overs)
Anita van Lier 27; Carole Hodges 4/14 (10 overs)		Janette Brittin 48 * Ingrid Keyzer 1/11 (8 overs)

England won by 9 wickets
North Sydney Oval, Sydney

- England won the toss and elected to bowl.

=== 10th Match ===
7 December
Scorecard

Australia; 167/9 (60 overs)	v	New Zealand; 121/8 (60 overs)
Denise Annetts 41; Brigit Legg 2/21 (12 overs)		Jackie Clark 38; Sharon Tredrea 3/20 (12 overs)

Australia won by 46 runs
Manuka Oval, Canberra

- New Zealand won the toss and elected to bowl.

=== 11th Match ===
9 December
Scorecard

Netherlands; 143 (60 overs)	v	Ireland; 144/5 (56.4 overs)
Anita van Lier 46; Stella Owens 3/31 (12 overs)		Anne Murray 44; Dorine Loman 2/20 (9 overs)

Ireland won by 5 wickets
Carey Baptist Grammar School (No. 1 Oval), Melbourne

- Ireland won the toss and elected to bowl.

=== 12th Match ===
10 December
Scorecard

Australia; 211/3 (60 overs)	v	New Zealand; 136/6 (60 overs)
Lindsay Reeler 108*; Jennifer Turner 2/35 (9 overs)		Lesley Murdoch 37; Sharon Tredrea 1/20 (10 overs)

Australia won by 75 runs
Albert Cricket Ground, Melbourne

- Australia won the toss and elected to bat.

=== 13th Match ===
11 December
Scorecard

England; 167/8 (60 overs)	v	Australia; 152 (57.4 overs)
Carole Hodges 62; Zoe Goss 2/34 (12 overs)		Sharon Tredrea 46; Karen Smithies 2/13 (6 overs)

England won by 15 runs
Richmond Cricket Ground, Melbourne

- England won the toss and elected to bat.

=== 14th Match ===
11 December
Scorecard

New Zealand; 217/6 (60 overs)	v	Ireland; 106/8 (60 overs)
Jackie Clark 76; Elizabeth Owens 2/51 (12 overs)		Anne Murray 20; Mary-Pat Moore 20; Kirsty Bond 2/5 (6 overs)

New Zealand won by 111 runs
Albert Cricket Ground, Melbourne

- Ireland won the toss and elected to bat.

=== 15th Match ===
13 December
Scorecard

Ireland; 109/9 (60 overs)	v	England; 110/0 (25.3 overs)
Anne Murray 25; Carole Hodges 3/19 (12 overs)		Wendy Watson 63 *

England won by 10 wickets
Carey Baptist Grammar School (No. 1 Oval), Melbourne

- England won the toss and elected to bowl.

=== 16th Match ===
13 December
Scorecard

New Zealand; 255/2 (60 overs)	v	Netherlands; 78 (59.1 overs)
Nicki Turner 95; Ingrid Keyzer 1/35 (12 overs)		Liesbeth Vernout 33; Brigit Legg 3/4 (12 overs)

New Zealand won by 177 runs
Carey Baptist Grammar School (No. 2 Oval), Melbourne

- New Zealand won the toss and elected to bowl.

=== 17th Match ===
14 December
Scorecard

Australia; 258/4 (60 overs)	v	Netherlands; 85 (53.3 overs)
Ruth Buckstein 105 * Liesbeth Vernout 1/25 (8 overs)		Anita van Lier 16; Lyn Fullston 5/28 (12 overs)

Australia won by 173 runs
Carey Baptist Grammar School (No. 2 Oval), Melbourne

- Australia won the toss and elected to bat.
- Australia's Lyn Fullston recorded the only five-wicket haul of the tournament, 5/28 from 12 overs.

=== 18th Match ===
14 December
Scorecard

England; 177 (59.4 overs)	v	New Zealand; 178/5 (55 overs)
Wendy Watson 44; Debbie Hockley 1/11 (3.4 overs)		Debbie Hockley 50 * Patsy Lovell 1/25 (12 overs)

New Zealand won by 5 wickets
Carey Baptist Grammar School (No. 1 Oval), Melbourne

- England won the toss and elected to bat.

=== 19th Match ===
16 December
Scorecard

Ireland; 88 (56.2 overs)	v	Australia; 89/0 (21.4 overs)
Sonia Reamsbottom 14; Lyn Fullston 4/21 (12 overs)		Lindsay Reeler 63 *

Australia won by 10 wickets
Carey Baptist Grammar School (No. 1 Oval), Melbourne

- Ireland won the toss and elected to bat.

=== 20th Match ===
16 December
Scorecard

England; 278/3 (60 overs)	v	Netherlands; 98/9 (60 overs)
Carole Hodges 91; Esther Veltman 1/42 (8 overs)		Hilone Dinnissen 46; Patsy Lovell 3/15 (10 overs)

England won by 180 runs
Carey Baptist Grammar School (No. 2 Oval), Melbourne

- Netherlands won the toss and elected to bowl.

== Finals ==
=== Third place play-off ===
17 December
Scorecard

New Zealand; 208/6 (60 overs)	v	Ireland; 138/7 (60 overs)
Karen Gunn 46*; Mary-Pat Moore 1/10 (6 overs)		Mary-Pat Moore 54*; Brigit Legg 2/14 (12 overs)

New Zealand won by 70 runs
Richmond Cricket Ground, Melbourne

- New Zealand won the toss and elected to bat.

=== Final ===
The final, held at the Melbourne Cricket Ground, was broadcast live on radio and on ABC Television. It was attended by around 3,000 people, although the ground had a capacity at the time of over 90,000. Janette Brittin, who played for England in the match, later described the venue as having "wall-to-wall seating with no one sitting in them", making it "a very large and a very lonely place". No women's cricket had been played there since 1949.

18 December
Scorecard

England; 127/7 (60 overs)	v	Australia; 129/2 (44.5 overs)
Janette Brittin 46* (108); Lyn Larsen 2/22 (12 overs)		Lindsay Reeler 59* (147); Jo Chamberlain 1/23 (8 overs)

Australia won by 8 wickets
Melbourne Cricket Ground
Umpires: Robin Bailhache and Len King

- England won the toss and elected to bat.

== Statistics ==
=== Most runs ===
The top five runscorers are included in this table, ranked by runs scored and then by batting average.

Player	Team	Runs	Inns	Avg	Highest	100s	50s
Lindsay Reeler	Australia	448	8	149.33	143*	2	2
Debbie Hockley	New Zealand	446	9	63.71	90*	0	5
Nicki Turner	New Zealand	342	8	42.75	114	1	1
Carole Hodges	England	336	9	42.00	91	0	2
Ruth Buckstein	Australia	289	7	57.80	105*	2	0

Source: CricketArchive Cricinfo

=== Most wickets ===
The top five wicket takers are listed in this table, ranked by wickets taken and then by bowling average.

Player	Team	Overs	Wkts	Ave	SR	Econ	BBI
Lyn Fullston	Australia	86.1	16	11.87	32.31	2.20	5/28
Karen Brown	Australia	87.0	12	10.83	43.50	1.49	4/4
Carole Hodges	England	83.0	12	16.08	41.50	2.32	4/14
Sharon Tredrea	Australia	90.0	11	13.27	49.09	1.62	3/9
Brigit Legg	New Zealand	100.2	11	14.36	54.72	1.57	3/4

Source: CricketArchive Cricinfo
