= List of Netherlands national cricket captains =

This is a list of all the cricketers who have captained the Netherlands men's team, Netherlands under-19 team and Netherlands women's team in an official international match. This includes the ICC tournaments, Under-19 games One Day Internationals and Twenty20 Internationals. This list is correct as of 31 July 2026.

== Men's cricket ==
=== One Day Internationals ===
The Netherlands played their first ODI on February 17, 1996.

Dutch ODI captains
No.	Name	Year	Played	Won	Tied	Lost	NR
1	Steven Lubbers	1996–1996	4	0	0	4	0
2	Roland Lefebvre	1996–2003	8	0	0	8	0
3	Luuk van Troost	2003–2007	16	7	0	8	1
4	Jeroen Smits	2007–2009	17	11	0	5	1
5	Peter Borren	2010–2014	31	10	1	19	1
6	Pieter Seelaar	2018–2022	20	6	0	13	1
7	Scott Edwards	2022–2026	56	24	1	29	2
8	Max O'Dowd	2025	1	0	0	1	0
Overall			153	58	2	87	6

=== Twenty20 Internationals ===
The Netherlands played their first Twenty20 International on August 2, 2008.

Dutch T20I Captains
No.	Name	Year	Played	Won	Tied	Lost	NR
1	Jeroen Smits	2008–2009	6	3	0	2	1
2	Peter Borren	2010–2017	37	21	0	15	1
3	Michael Swart	2013	2	0	0	2	0
4	Pieter Seelaar	2018–2022	38	17	2	18	1
5	Scott Edwards	2022–2026	50	23	1	24	2
Overall			133	64	3	61	5

=== Captains in ICC tournaments ===
Cricket World Cup

The Netherlands debuted in the Cricket World Cup in the 1996 tournament.

Dutch captains in the Cricket World Cup
Number	Name	Year	Played	Won	Tied	Lost	No Result
1	Steven Lubbers	1996	5	0	0	5	0
2	Roland Lefebvre	2003	6	1	0	5	0
3	Luuk van Troost	2007	3	1	0	2	0
4	Peter Borren	2011	6	0	0	6	0
5	Scott Edwards	2023	9	2	0	7	0
Overall			29	4	0	25	0

T20 World Cup

The Netherlands debuted in the T20 World Cup in the 2009 tournament.

Dutch captains in the Men's T20 World Cup
Number	Name	Year	Played	Won	Tied	Lost	No Result
1	Jeroen Smits	2009	2	1	0	1	0
2	Peter Borren	2014–2016	10	4	0	5	1
3	Pieter Seelaar	2021	3	0	0	3	0
4	Scott Edwards	2022–2026	16	6	0	10	0
Overall			31	11	0	19	1

ICC Trophy/Cricket World Cup Qualifier

The Netherlands debuted in the ICC Trophy in the 1979 tournament.

Dutch captains in the Cricket World Cup Qualifier
Number	Name	Year	Played	Won	Tied	Lost	No Result
1	Chris van Schouwenburg	1979	3	1	0	2	0
2	Dik Abed	1982	4	3	0	1	0
3	Rob van Weelde	1986	9	7	0	2	0
4	Steven Lubbers	1990–1994	18	14	0	4	0
5	Tim de Leede	1997	7	3	0	3	1
6	Roland Lefebvre	2001	9	8	0	1	0
7	Reinout Scholte	2001	1	1	0	0	0
8	Luuk van Troost	2005	6	5	0	1	0
9	Jeroen Smits	2009	10	7	0	3	0
10	Peter Borren	2014–2018	12	7	0	5	0
11	Scott Edwards	2023	8	4	1	3	0
Overall			87	60	1	25	1

T20 World Cup Qualifier/Europe regional final

Number	Name	Year	Played	Won	Tied	Lost	No Result
Dutch captains in the Men's T20 World Cup Qualifier
1	Jeroen Smits	2008	4	2	0	1	1
2	Peter Borren	2010–2015	32	23	0	9	0
3	Pieter Seelaar	2019	9	8	0	1	0
4	Scott Edwards	2022	5	4	0	1	0
Dutch captains in the Europe regional final
1	Scott Edwards	2025	4	3	0	1	0
Overall			50	40	0	9	1

Champions Trophy

Dutch captains in the ICC Champions Trophy
Number	Name	Year	Played	Won	Tied	Lost	No Result
1	Roland Lefebvre	2002	2	0	0	2	0
Overall			2	0	0	2	0

== Women's cricket ==
=== Women's Tests ===
Although Netherlands is not a full member of the ICC, the women's team played one test match in 2007. This is a list of Dutch cricketers who have captained their country in a Women's Test.

Dutch Women's Test Captains
Number	Name	Year	Played	Won	Tied	Lost	No Result
1	Helmien Rambaldo	2007	1	0	0	1	0
Overall			1	0	0	1	0

=== Women's One Day Internationals ===
This is a list of Dutch cricketers who have captained their country in a Women's ODI.

Dutch Women's ODI Captains
Number	Name	Year	Played	Won	Tied	Lost	No Result
1	Anita van Lier	1984–1993	10	0	0	10	0
2	Ingrid Keyzer	1989–1990	6	2	0	4	0
3	Irene Schoof	1991	3	1	0	2	0
4	Nicola Payne	1993–1997	7	1	0	6	0
5	Edmee Janss	1995	3	1	0	2	0
6	Pauline te Beest	1997–2001	29	6	0	23	0
7	Caroline Salomons	2001–2006	17	7	0	10	0
8	Helmien Rambaldo	2007–2011	25	1	0	23	1
9	Mandy Kornet	2009	1	0	0	1	0
10	Babette de Leede	2022–present	8	3	0	5	0
11	Heather Siegers	2022–2023	5	1	0	4	0
Overall			114	23	0	90	1

=== Women's Twenty20 Internationals ===
This is a list of Dutch cricketers who have captained their country in a Women's T20I.

Dutch Women's T20I Captains
Number	Name	Year	Played	Won	Tied	Lost	No Result
1	Helmien Rambaldo	2008–2011	10	0	0	9	1
2	Mandy Kornet	2009	1	0	0	1	0
3	Heather Siegers	2009	39	17	1	20	1
4	Juliët Post	2019	16	5	1	9	1
5	Babette de Leede	2022–present	39	29	0	9	1
Overall			105	51	2	48	4

=== Captains in ICC tournaments ===
Women's Cricket World Cup

The Netherlands debuted in the Women's Cricket World Cup in the 1988 tournament.

Dutch captains in the Women's Cricket World Cup
Number	Name	Year	Played	Won	Tied	Lost	No Result
1	Anita van Lier	1988	9	0	0	9	0
2	Nicola Payne	1993	7	1	0	6	0
3	Pauline te Beest	1997–2000	11	1	0	9	1
Overall			27	2	0	24	1

IWCC Trophy/Women's Cricket World Cup Qualifier

The Netherlands debuted in the Women's World Cup Qualifier in the 2003 tournament.

Dutch captains in the Women's Cricket World Cup Qualifier
Number	Name	Year	Played	Won	Tied	Lost	No Result
1	Caroline Salomons	2003	5	3	0	2	0
2	Helmien Rambaldo	2008–2011	12	5	0	7	0
3	Heather Siegers	2021	2	0	0	2	0
Overall			19	8	0	11	0

T20 World Cup Qualifier

Dutch captains in the Women's T20 World Cup Qualifier
Number	Name	Year	Played	Won	Tied	Lost	No Result
1	Denise Hannema	2013	5	1	0	4	0
2	Esther de Lange	2015	4	0	0	4	0
3	Heather Siegers	2018–2024	8	2	0	6	0
4	Juliët Post	2019	4	1	0	3	0
5	Babette de Leede	2026	6	5	0	1	0
Overall			27	9	0	18	0

== Youth cricket ==
=== Youth One Day Internationals ===
This is a list of Dutch cricketers who have captained their country in an Under-19's ODI. Netherlands played their first Youth ODI at the 2000 Under-19 Cricket World Cup.

Dutch Under 19's Captains
Number	Name	Year	Played	Won	Tied	Lost	No Result
1	Reinout van Ierschot	1999–2000	6	1	0	4	1
Overall			6	1	0	4	1
