= IWCC =

IWCC may stand for:

- Intermountain West Communications Company
- International Women's Club Championship
- International Women's Cricket Council
- Iowa Western Community College
