= Hilone Dinnissen =

Dutch cricketer

Personal information
- Full name: Hilone Dinnissen
- Born: 8 June 1965 (age 61)
- Role: Wicket-keeper

International information
- National side: Netherlands (1985–1991)
- ODI debut (cap 13): 29 November 1988 v Australia
- Last ODI: 19 July 1991 v Ireland

Career statistics
Competition	WODI
Matches	8
Runs scored	68
Batting average	8.50
100s/50s	0/0
Top score	28
Catches/stumpings	1/0
- Source: CricketArchive, 15 July 2015

Hilone Dinnissen (born 8 June 1965) is a former Dutch cricketer whose international career for the Dutch national side spanned from 1985 to 1991. A wicket-keeper, she played eight One Day International (ODI) matches, including games at the 1988 World Cup. Her club cricket was played for Kampong.

As an 18-year-old, Dinnissen appeared for a Young Netherlands team at the 1983 Centenary Tournament in Utrecht, which also featured the senior teams of Denmark, Ireland, and the Netherlands. Her own senior debut came in August 1985, during a tour of England, while her ODI debut was made at the 1988 World Cup in Australia. With Isabelle Koppe-van Dishoek the first-choice wicket-keeper, Dinnissen was initially used solely as a middle-order batsman. However, in the games against Ireland and England later in the tournament, she did keep wicket (in Koppe-van Dishoek's absence). Against England, she top-scored with 28 runs from a team total of 98/9, making what was to be her highest ODI score. After the World Cup, Dinnissen played only three more ODIs – one in the 1990 European Championship, and two in the 1991 edition. She played only as a batsman at those tournaments, with Karen van Rijn keeping wicket.
