= Edmee Janss =

Dutch cricketer (born 1965)

Personal information
- Born: 4 July 1965 (age 61)
- Batting: Right-handed
- Role: Opening batsman

International information
- National side: Netherlands (1989–1997)
- ODI debut (cap 20): 19 July 1989 v England
- Last ODI: 20 December 1997 v Australia

Career statistics
Competition	WODI
Matches	21
Runs scored	301
Batting average	15.84
100s/50s	0/0
Top score	47
Catches/stumpings	2/–
- Source: CricketArchive, 19 October 2015

Edmee Janss (born 4 July 1965) is a former Dutch international cricketer who played 21 One Day Internationals (ODIs) for the Dutch national side, including at the 1993 and 1997 World Cups.

Janss appeared for a Young Netherlands team at the 1983 Centenary Tournament in Utrecht, which also featured the Dutch senior team and those of Denmark and Ireland. A right-handed opening batsman, her senior debut did not come until the 1989 European Cup in Denmark, where she played three matches with three different opening partners – Geeske Ludwig against England, Vanda Wesenhagen against Ireland, and Leine Loman against Denmark. At the 1990 European Cup, Janss was partnered with Irene Schoof, but was dropped for the final match after two low scores. She did not play again at ODI level until the 1993 World Cup, where she featured six out of a possible seven matches. However, she scored only 35 runs for the tournament, finishing with a batting average of just 5.83.

By the time of the 1995 European Cup, Janss was one of the more senior players in the national squad, and was appointed captain in place of Nicola Payne. In the first match against England, she opened the batting with Jiska Howard and hit a team-high 44 from 166 balls. She followed up with 27 against Ireland and 29 against Denmark, with the Netherlands recording a rare ODI win in the latter fixture. Despite Janss's run of form, Payne returned as captain for the team's next ODI series, against Denmark in July 1997. Payne promoted herself to open the batting with Janss, and in the first ODI the pair put on 83, with Janss contributing a career-high 47 runs. In the next match, a ten-wicket victory, the pair put on 147 not out, setting a Dutch record that is yet to be beaten. Janss played her final tournament for the Netherlands at the 1997 World Cup in India, by which time she had turned 32. She finished her career with 301 runs from 21 ODIs, the most scored by a Dutchwoman without a half-century to her name.
