= Corneliussen =

Corneliussen is a surname. Notable people with the surname include:

- Charlotte Corneliussen, Danish cricketer
- Elias Corneliussen (1881–1951), Norwegian military officer
- Stephanie Corneliussen (born 1987), Danish actress and model
- Torleiv Corneliussen (1890–1975), Norwegian sailor
