= Cornelia Eveleens =

Dutch cricketer

Personal information
- Full name: Cornelia Eveleens
- Born: 1962 (age 63–64)

International information
- National side: Netherlands (1988–1989)
- ODI debut (cap 15): 29 November 1988 v Australia
- Last ODI: 21 July 1989 v Denmark

Career statistics
Competition	WODI
Matches	6
Runs scored	2
Batting average	0.40
100s/50s	0/0
Top score	2
Balls bowled	90
Wickets	1
Bowling average	88.00
5 wickets in innings	0
10 wickets in match	0
Best bowling	1/28
Catches/stumpings	0/–
- Source: CricketArchive, 29 June 2015

Cornelia Eveleens (born 1962) is a former Dutch international cricketer who played six One Day International (ODI) matches for the Dutch national side. All but two of her matches came at the 1988 World Cup.

== Career ==
Selected in the Dutch squad for the 1988 World Cup in Australia, Eveleens played in four of a possible eight matches, including the tournament opener against Australia. An all-rounder who batted in the lower order and bowled only occasionally at the World Cup, she did not score her first international runs until her fourth match, having made ducks in her first three innings. Her first (and only) international wicket came in her third match, against Ireland, where she finished with 1/28 from six overs after trapping Sonia Reamsbottom leg before wicket. Eveleens played her final ODIs for the Netherlands at the 1989 European Championship in Denmark, featuring in her team's game against Denmark and Ireland. However, she played little part, making another duck in her only innings and not being called upon to bowl at all. Eveleens finished her ODI career with a batting average of 0.40, having scored ducks in four of her five innings. From the 15 overs she bowled, she conceded 88 runs, an economy rate of 5.86 (or close to one run per ball bowled).
