= Nicola Payne (cricketer) =

New Zealander cricketer

Personal information
- Born: 10 September 1969 (age 57); Toronto, Ontario, Canada
- Batting: Right-handed
- Bowling: Right-arm medium
- Role: Batter

International information
- National sides: Netherlands (1988–1998); New Zealand (2000–2003)
- ODI debut (cap 17/80): 29 November 1988; Netherlands v Australia
- Last ODI: 8 February 2003; New Zealand v Australia

Domestic team information
- Years: Team
- 1991/92: Queensland
- 1995/96–2002/03: Canterbury

Career statistics
Competition	WODI	WFC	WLA
Matches	65	2	147
Runs scored	1,178	21	3,384
Batting average	20.66	10.50	27.51
100s/50s	0/4	0/0	1/20
Top score	93	19	117*
Balls bowled	948	–	3,167
Wickets	20	–	62
Bowling average	20.35	–	26.70
5 wickets in innings	0	–	0
10 wickets in match	0	–	0
Best bowling	3/20	–	3/15
Catches/stumpings	17/–	1/–	34/–
- Source: CricketArchive, 21 July 2021

Nicola Payne (married name Wilson; born 10 September 1969) is a Canadian-born former cricketer who played international cricket for both the Netherlands and New Zealand. She played primarily as a right-handed batter. Payne appeared in 37 One Day Internationals (ODIs) for the Netherlands and a further 28 ODIs for New Zealand, and appeared at four World Cups. She played domestic cricket for Canterbury and Queensland.

Nicola now plays tennis at Gullane LTC, and plays in a successful Mixed Doubles pair with Bryan Leslie.

== Netherlands career ==
Born in Toronto, Ontario, Canada, Payne was raised in the Netherlands, and made her ODI debut for the national side at the age of 19, at the 1988 World Cup. A top-order batsman, at that tournament she played in seven of the team's eight matches, but scored only 42 runs from seven innings as the Netherlands went winless. Only one of her teammates, Anita Beecheno-van Lier, passed 100 runs for the tournament, and no Dutchwoman scored a half-century. Payne's next major tournament was the 1989 European Championship, hosted by Denmark, in which she scored 47 runs from her three matches (second only to Jet van Noortwijk for the Dutch). The 55-over tournament was at that time held annually, featuring three other teams besides the Netherlands – Denmark, England, and Ireland, with England by far the strongest team. Payne played in the following two tournaments, scoring 50 runs in the 1990 edition, held in England, and 67 runs in the 1991 edition, held in the Netherlands. Against Denmark in 1991, she took her first international wicket, bowling Danish tailender Lene Slebsager with her right-arm medium pace.

Payne spent the 1991–92 off-season (the European winter) playing for Queensland in the Australian Women's Championships. At the 1993 World Cup in England, she scored more than any other Dutch player, finishing with 121 runs from seven innings. Playing against Ireland, she scored 46 runs, her highest score of the tournament. She also took four wickets for the tournament, including 3/20 from twelve overs against Denmark – her best figures at ODI level. The Dutch side played only two ODI series between the 1993 and 1997 World Cups – the 1995 European Championships and a two-game series against Denmark in 1997, played at the Mikkelberg-Kunst-und-Cricket Center in Hattstedt, Germany. In the second game of the latter series, Payne scored 73 not out, her highest ODI score for the Netherlands. Having earlier taken 3/25 in the Danish innings, she featured in an unbroken 147-run opening partnership with Edmee Janss, which remains a record for the Netherlands as of January 2015. That innings was one of only two half-centuries Payne scored from 37 ODIs for the Netherlands. The second came against in the 1997 World Cup, an innings of 55 runs in the team's defeat of Sri Lanka.

Payne's last ODIs for the Netherlands came against Denmark in July 1998, again in Germany, in a repeat of the series played the previous year. She finished her Dutch ODI career with 631 runs from 37 matches, as well as 19 wickets, taken at an average of 20.26. As of January 2015, Payne is ranked sixth for ODIs played for the Dutch team, and fourth for ODI runs scored. She also captained the Netherlands in seven matches from 1993 to 1997, winning only one. Payne played for Voorburg Cricket Club in Voorburg, adjacent to The Hague.

== New Zealand career ==
Having played club cricket there previously, Payne emigrated to New Zealand in 1998, playing for the Canterbury Magicians in the newly established State Insurance Cup (sponsored by State Insurance, and from the 2001–02 season known as the State League). She made her ODI debut for New Zealand in February 2000, against Australia, becoming one of the few cricketers to represent more than one international team. New Zealand-born Rowan Milburn and Kerry-Anne Tomlinson also represented both New Zealand and The Netherlands. Nicola Payne played more and more regularly for New Zealand than for the Netherlands, playing eight ODIs in February 2000 online. She played three matches for the New Zealand team that won the 2000 World Cup (hosted by New Zealand), but did not feature in the side that defeated Australia in the final.

Following the 2000 World Cup, Payne established herself as one of New Zealand's opening batsmen, during 2002 playing in the Rose Bowl series against Australia, tours of Ireland and the Netherlands, and a tri-series featuring England and India, played in England and Jersey. She scored her maiden half-century for New Zealand in the first ODI against Ireland, an innings of 60 runs in a 153-run opening partnership with Rebecca Rolls. Payne's last series for New Zealand came at home in early 2003, in a tri-series against Australia and India dubbed the "World Series of Women's Cricket". Against India, she was run out for 93 off 130 balls, her highest ODI score. She injured her hamstring during that match, and, with other injuries in mind, announced her retirement in April 2003. Payne also finished her domestic limited-overs career for Canterbury at the end of the 2002–03 season, with her 49-match career including twelve half-centuries and a single century, 117 not out against the Wellington Blaze in December 1999.

== Coaching career ==
After finished her playing career, Payne gained coaching qualifications from the England and Wales Cricket Board (ECB) and New Zealand Cricket, initially coaching at Christchurch's St Albans Cricket Club (a club which she had previously captained). From 2013, she has been resident in Scotland, serving as Cricket Development Officer for East Lothian as part of a program established by Cricket Scotland. In 2016, she was appointed Girls and Women's Participation Manager at Cricket Scotland.

== See also ==
- List of cricketers who have played for two international teams
