= Sue Morris =

New Zealand cricketer (born 1958)

Personal information
- Full name: Susan Rachel Margaret Morris
- Born: 30 May 1958 (age 68); Auckland, New Zealand
- Batting: Right-handed
- Bowling: Right-arm medium
- Role: Bowler

International information
- National side: New Zealand (1988)
- ODI debut (cap 50): 29 November 1988 v Ireland
- Last ODI: 14 December 1988 v England

Domestic team information
- Years: Team
- 1975/76–1992/93: Auckland

Career statistics
| Competition | WODI | WFC | WLA |
|---|---|---|---|
| Matches | 8 | 23 | 41 |
| Runs scored | 5 | 224 | 203 |
| Batting average | 5.00 | 13.17 | 10.15 |
| 100s/50s | 0/0 | 0/0 | 0/1 |
| Top score | 5 | 30* | 52 |
| Balls bowled | 414 | 3,005 | 1,951 |
| Wickets | 7 | 75 | 48 |
| Bowling average | 25.00 | 18.85 | 19.68 |
| 5 wickets in innings | 0 | 2 | 0 |
| 10 wickets in match | 0 | 0 | 0 |
| Best bowling | 2/13 | 6/58 | 4/23 |
| Catches/stumpings | 0/– | 11/– | 4/– |
- Source: CricketArchive, 26 July 2021

Susan Rachel Margaret Morris (née Ruthe; born 30 May 1958) is a New Zealand former cricketer who played as a right-arm medium bowler. She appeared in eight One Day Internationals for New Zealand, all at the 1988 World Cup. She played domestic cricket for Auckland.
