= Vanda Wesenhagen =

Dutch cricketer

Personal information
- Born: 1957 (age 68–69); Netherlands
- Role: Middle-order batsman

International information
- National side: Netherlands (1983–1990)
- ODI debut (cap 19): 30 November 1988 v Ireland
- Last ODI: 20 July 1990 v Denmark
- Source: CricketArchive, 14 April 2016

Vanda Wesenhagen (born 1957) is a former Dutch international cricketer who represented the Dutch national team between 1981 and 1990, including at the 1988 World Cup. She played as a middle-order batsman and occasional medium-pace bowler.

Wesenhagen made her international debut for the Netherlands at the 1981 Engeland tour, and 1983 Centenary Tournament in Utrecht, playing against Denmark. She opened the bowling with Chantal Grevers, and came in fourth in the batting order. In a three-day match against Ireland in 1987 (an unofficial Test), Wesenhagen was the leading run-scorer in her team's first innings, making 12 out of a team total of 55. She was promoted to open the batting in the second innings, but made only eight runs as the Netherlands lost by an innings and 19 runs. Selected in the Dutch squad for the 1988 World Cup in Australia, Wesenhagen played in six of her team's eight matches – her first One Day International (ODI) appearances. She made 66 runs, the second-most for her team behind Anita van Lier's 159, and her highest score was 41 not out on debut against Ireland. After the World Cup, Wesenhagen made appearances at two further ODI tournaments – the 1989 and 1990 European Cups.
