= Eric Dulfer =

Dutch cricketer

Erik Dulfer
Personal information
- Full name: Erik H. Dulfer
- Born: 6 April 1961 (age 65); Schiedam, Netherlands
- Batting: Right-handed
- Bowling: Right-arm off-spin

International information
- National side: Netherlands (1985–1997)
- Source: CricketArchive, 21 February 2016

Erik H. Dulfer (born 6 April 1961) is a former Dutch international cricketer who represented the Dutch national side between 1985 and 1997. He played as a right-arm off-spin bowler.

Dulfer was born in Schiedam, and played his club cricket for Excelsior '20. He made his senior national debut in 1985, on a tour of England, and the following year played a single match at the 1986 ICC Trophy in England (against Israel). At the 1990 ICC Trophy, which the Netherlands hosted, Dulfer played in seven of his team's nine matches, including the final against Zimbabwe. He took 11 wickets, behind only Roland Lefebvre and Andre van Troost amongst his teammates, and against Canada took figures of 5/38. Dulfer toured England in 1992, playing against several county teams, but then had to wait five years for another game with the national team. He returned to the side in June 1997, in a friendly match against Herefordshire, and later in the year played against Worcestershire in the 1997 NatWest Trophy, a game which held List A status.

Dulfer married fellow cricketer Ingrid Keijzer (played 95 games for the Dutch national handballteam women) has 3 children and is the father of the handball player Kelly Dulfer.
