= Angela Venturini =

Dutch cricketer

Personal information
- Full name: Angela Venturini
- Born: 19 November 1964 (age 61)
- Bowling: Right-arm medium
- Role: Bowler

International information
- National side: Netherlands (1988–1995)
- ODI debut (cap 12): 29 November 1988 v Australia
- Last ODI: 20 July 1995 v Ireland

Career statistics
Competition	WODI
Matches	24
Runs scored	53
Batting average	3.78
100s/50s	0/0
Top score	9
Balls bowled	1,305
Wickets	15
Bowling average	43.66
5 wickets in innings	0
10 wickets in match	0
Best bowling	4/17
Catches/stumpings	4/–
- Source: CricketArchive, 29 June 2015

Angela Venturini (married name Batenburg-Venturini; born 19 November 1964) is a former Dutch cricketer whose international career for the Dutch national side spanned from 1988 to 1996. A right-arm medium-pacer, she finished her career with 24 One Day International (ODI) matches, including games at both the 1988 and 1993 World Cups. Her club cricket was played for Schiedam's Excelsior '20.

Venturini appeared for a Young Netherlands team at the 1983 Centenary Tournament in Utrecht, which also featured the senior teams of Denmark, Ireland, and the Netherlands. She made her ODI debut at the 1988 World Cup in Australia, but took only three wickets from her seven matches (with a best of 2/59 against New Zealand). However, only Ingrid Dulfer-Keijzer and Dorine Loman managed more, with four apiece. Venturini's next ODIs were played at the 1989, 1990, and 1991 editions of the European Championship. Against Ireland in Haarlem at the 1991 edition, she took 4/17 from 7.3 overs, at the time the second-best ODI figures by a Dutchwoman, behind Ingrid Dulfer-Keijzer's 4/14 against Denmark the previous year. Cheraldine Oudolf and Annemarie Tanke have since surpassed both Dulfer-Keijzer and Venturini.

At the 1993 World Cup in England, Venturini was one of only five players to feature in all seven matches for the Netherlands. However, she took only a single wicket, finishing with 1/23 against Ireland. Her bowling average at the tournament was consequently 149.00, the worst of any player. Venturini went on to play two further ODIs, against Ireland and Denmark at the 1995 European Championship. She finished her career with 15 wickets from 24 ODIs, and having bowled more overs than any other Dutchwoman (a record since broken by Sandra Kottman and Carolien Salomons).
