= Lloyd Armstrong =

Irish cricketer (1914–1959)

Personal information
- Full name: Robert Lloyd George Armstrong
- Born: 22 May 1914
- Died: 9 April 1959 (aged 44)
- Batting: Right-handed
- Bowling: Right-arm medium
- Relatives: Donna Armstrong (daughter)

International information
- National side: Ireland

Career statistics
| Competition | First-class |
|---|---|
| Matches | 5 |
| Runs scored | 121 |
| Batting average | 13.44 |
| 100s/50s | 0/0 |
| Top score | 29* |
| Balls bowled | 342 |
| Wickets | 6 |
| Bowling average | 21.50 |
| 5 wickets in innings | 0 |
| 10 wickets in match | 0 |
| Best bowling | 4/16 |
| Catches/stumpings | 1/– |
- Source: CricketArchive, 27 May 2021

Robert Lloyd George Armstrong (22 May 1914 – 9 April 1959) was an Irish cricketer. He was a right-handed batsman and a right-arm medium pace bowler.

Armstrong made his debut for Ireland in August 1947, playing against the MCC at Lord's. He went on to play for them on 11 occasions, his last match coming against Glamorgan in May 1953. Five of his games for Ireland had first-class status.

Armstrong's daughter, Donna Armstrong, played international cricket for the Irish women's team.
