= Anne-Mette Fernandes =

Danish cricketer

Personal information
- Full name: Anne-Mette Fernandes

International information
- National side: Denmark
- ODI debut (cap 2): 19 July 1989 v Ireland
- Last ODI: 21 July 1989 v Netherlands

Career statistics
Competition	WODI
Matches	2
Runs scored	2
Batting average	2.00
100s/50s	0/0
Top score	2
Catches/stumpings	0/0
- Source: Cricinfo, 25 September 2020

Anne-Mette Fernandes is a former women's cricketer for the Denmark national women's cricket team who played two ODIs during the 1989 Women's European Cricket Cup. She only batted in one of the matches, scoring two runs, and did not bowl.
