= List of Netherlands women ODI cricketers =

This is a list of Duch women's One-day international cricketers. The Netherlands women's national cricket team played Women's One Day International cricket from 1984 until 2011. After 11 years, in May 2022, the ICC announced the Netherlands as one of five women's sides to gain ODI status. After this announcement, on 22 August 2022, they played their first ODI against Ireland women's national cricket team. To date, 94 players have appeared for the Netherlands. A One Day International, or an ODI, is an international cricket match between two representative teams, each having ODI status. An ODI differs from test matches in that the number of overs per team is limited, and that each team has only one innings. The list is arranged in the order in which each player won her first ODI cap. Where more than one player won her first ODI cap in the same match, their surnames are listed alphabetically.

== Key ==
General

- ‡ – Captain
- † – Wicket-keeper
- Mat – Number of matches played

Batting

- Inn – Number of innings batted
- NO – Number of innings not out
- Runs – Runs scored in career
- HS – Highest score
- Avg – Runs scored per dismissal
- * – Batsman remained not out

Bowling

- Balls – Balls bowled in career
- Wkt – Wickets taken in career
- BBI – Best bowling in an innings
- Ave – Average runs per wicket

Fielding

- Ca – Catches taken
- St – Stumpings effected

== List of WODI cricketers ==
Statistics are correct as of 31 August 2026.

Netherlands Women ODI cricketers
Cap	Name	First	Last	Mat	Batting					Bowling				Fielding		Ref
Cap	Name	First	Last	Mat	Runs	HS	Avg	50	100	Balls	Wkt	BBI	Ave	Ca	St	Ref
1	Mickey de Boer	1984	1984	1	8	8*	–	0	0	66	1	1/40	40.00	0	0	
2	Chantal Grevers	1984	1990	13	69	26	6.27	0	0	600	7	3/10	48.85	5	0	
3	Saskia Keijzer-Klein	1984	1984	1	4	4	4.00	0	0	60	0	—	—	0	0	
4	Dorine Loman	1984	1991	11	31	10	5.16	0	0	522	8	2/20	37.75	2	0	
5	Barbara Meihuizen †	1984	1984	1	6	6	6.00	0	0	—	—	—	—	0	2	
6	Lonneke Offenberg	1984	1984	1	1	1	1.00	0	0	—	—	—	—	0	0	
7	Irene Schoof‡	1984	1991	15	168	38	11.20	0	0	144	1	1/28	95.00	4	0	
8	Cor van der Flier	1984	1984	1	4	4	4.00	0	0	66	4	4/24	6.00	0	0	
9	Anita van Lier‡	1984	1993	16	300	46	18.75	0	0	571	10	4/24	38.20	0	0	
10	Babette van Teunenbroek	1984	1989	9	55	17	6.11	0	0	—	—	—	—	0	0	(Note: Babette van Teunenbroek also played Women's One Day International matches for International XI women. Only her records for Netherlands women are given above.)
11	Liesbeth Vernout	1984	1988	8	68	33	8.50	0	0	300	2	1/25	116.50	2	0	
12	Angela Venturini	1988	1995	24	53	9	3.78	0	0	1305	15	4/17	43.66	2	0	
13	Hilone Dinnissen	1988	1991	8	68	28	8.50	0	0	—	—	—	—	1	0	
14	Ingrid Keijzer‡	1988	1993	20	180	28	11.25	0	0	1170	21	4/14	21.61	3	0	
15	Cornelia Eveleens	1988	1989	6	2	2	0.40	0	0	90	1	1/28	88.00	0	0	
16	Isabelle Koppe-van Dishoek†	1988	1988	6	8	4*	8.00	0	0	—	—	—	—	3	0	
17	Nicola Payne‡	1988	1998	37	631	73*	18.02	2	0	918	19	3/20	20.26	16	0	(Note: Nicola Payne also played Women's One Day International matches for New Zealand women. Only her records for Netherlands women are given above.)
18	Esther Veltman	1988	1993	19	91	15	6.50	0	0	1094	17	4/26	32.17	0	0	
19	Vanda Wesenhagen	1988	1990	10	86	41*	9.55	0	0	102	1	1/29	51.00	2	0	
20	Edmee Janss‡	1989	1997	21	301	47	15.84	0	0	—	—	—	—	2	0	
21	Madeleine Loman	1989	1989	2	11	11	11.00	0	0	—	—	—	—	0	0	
22	Geeske Ludwig	1989	1993	5	9	2*	2.25	0	0	—	—	—	—	0	0	
23	Ariette van Noortwijk	1989	1997	27	324	52	14.08	1	0	1028	24	4/21	19.33	4	0	
24	Karen van Rijn†	1989	1991	9	70	20	10.00	0	0	—	—	—	—	4	0	
25	Pauline te Beest‡†	1990	2008	64	1361	142	22.31	4	2	78	3	2/11	25.33	24	1	
26	Jiska Howard	1990	1999	21	207	66	9.85	1	0	—	—	—	—	0	0	
27	Caroline de Fouw	1991	2008	35	163	23	6.79	0	0	1099	26	3/23	25.30	9	0	
28	Sandra Kottman	1991	2003	32	49	6	4.90	0	0	1477	31	4/24	25.54	1	0	
29	Remke Scheepstra	1991	1991	1	1	1	1.00	0	0	—	—	—	—	0	0	
30	Inge Kure	1993	1993	6	7	5	1.40	0	0	116	1	1/4	75.00	1	0	
31	Saskia Melchers†	1993	1993	5	2	2	0.66	0	0	—	—	—	—	2	0	
32	Wendy Gerritsen	1993	1995	7	68	20*	22.66	0	0	294	7	3/21	24.85	1	0	
33	Marieke Hommels	1995	1995	2	—	—	—	0	0	66	1	1/14	31.00	0	0	
34	Annette Kroon †	1995	1995	2	—	—	—	0	0	—	—	—	—	1	1	
35	Cheraldine Oudolf	1995	2009	36	165	32	5.68	0	0	1188	25	5/20	30.28	10	0	
36	Maartje Köster	1995	2007	46	539	58*	15.40	1	0	338	6	1/8	38.00	10	0	
37	Caroline Salomons‡†	1995	2011	51	894	89	20.31	5	0	1432	37	3/11	18.67	23	1	
38	Muriel Grunsing	1997	1997	2	4	4*	—	0	0	36	0	—	—	2	0	
39	Elise Reynolds	1997	2000	16	11	5*	1.37	0	0	686	10	3/9	33.50	5	0	
40	Caroline Rambaldo	1997	2001	23	106	25	5.88	0	0	896	19	2/10	26.84	1	0	
41	Annemarie Tanke	1997	2010	39	451	61	12.52	1	0	787	21	5/40	34.04	4	0	
42	Maaike Schroeder †	1997	1998	9	21	11	3.40	0	0	—	—	—	—	3	1	
43	Kirsten Zorab	1997	2002	5	2	2	0.66	0	0	198	0	—	—	0	0	
44	Helmien Rambaldo‡	1998	2011	46	723	67	15.71	1	0	440	6	2/13	57.83	13	0	
45	Jolet Hartenhof	1998	2011	28	8	4*	0.72	0	0	939	22	3/29	30.95	2	0	
46	Andrea van de Broeke	1998	1998	1	1	1	1.00	0	0	—	—	—	—	0	0	
47	Teuntje de Boer	1999	2001	14	114	26	8.14	0	0	639	10	2/15	38.90	4	0	
48	Martika Flieringa†	1999	1999	4	8	5*	—	0	0	—	—	—	—	0	0	
49	Leonie Hoitink	1999	2008	14	92	18	6.57	0	0	—	—	—	—	0	0	
50	Iris Jharap	1999	2001	12	7	4	3.50	0	0	302	6	1/2	31.00	2	0	
51	Carly Verheul	1999	2002	10	74	46*	9.25	0	0	18	0	—	—	2	0	
52	Eugenie van Leeuwen	1999	2003	17	103	18	14.71	0	0	678	17	2/11	23.17	2	0	
53	Debby Kooij	1999	2003	7	123	78	17.56	1	0	—	—	—	—	2	0	
54	Rowan Milburn †	2000	2000	7	148	71	21.14	1	0	—	—	—	—	1	5	(Note: Rowan Milburn also played Women's One Day International matches for New Zealand women. Only her records for Netherlands women are given above.)
55	Tessa van der Gun	2000	2000	7	64	43	10.66	0	0	66	3	3/18	20.00	3	0	
56	Minou Toussaint †	2001	2002	9	22	7	5.50	0	0	—	—	—	—	5	1	
57	Birgit Viguurs	2001	2005	13	108	58*	9.81	1	0	316	10	3/7	19.70	3	0	
58	Marjolijn Molenaar	2001	2006	15	23	11	5.75	0	0	600	11	2/38	35.00	2	0	
59	Claudine van de Kieft	2001	2001	5	5	4	2.50	0	0	174	4	2/21	25.50	0	0	
60	Caroline Hes	2001	2001	2	—	—	—	0	0	24	1	1/10	10.00	0	0	
61	Mandy Kornet‡	2001	2009	15	16	8*	1.33	0	0	696	12	3/10	40.83	2	0	
62	Inge Leurs†	2002	2005	4	22	22	5.50	0	0	—	—	—	—	0	0	
63	Merel de Regt †	2003	2003	3	6	6	6.00	0	0	—	—	—	—	4	2	
64	Esther de Lange	2005	2011	15	74	13*	6.72	0	0	544	19	4/43	21.10	0	0	
65	Lotte Egging	2005	2011	12	23	7	3.33	0	0	587	12	4/56	40.91	6	0	
66	Marijn Nijman	2005	2011	21	292	43	15.36	0	0	348	5	1/24	56.80	6	0	
67	Isabelle Westbury	2005	2005	1	—	—	—	0	0	60	0	—	—	1	0	
68	Marloes Braat	2006	2011	19	72	14*	5.53	0	0	691	12	3/39	40.50	1	0	
69	Marijke Overhoff	2006	2006	1	9	9	0.00	0	0	—	—	—	—	0	0	
70	Jacqueline Pashley †	2006	2008	10	56	19*	7.00	0	0	—	—	—	—	5	5	
71	Denise Prins	2006	2010	7	15	8	2.14	0	0	—	—	—	—	1	0	
72	Violet Wattenberg †	2007	2011	19	179	34*	9.42	0	0	—	—	—	—	12	3	
73	Carlijn de Groot	2007	2011	15	92	21	6.13	0	0	—	—	—	—	1	0	
74	Denise van Deventer	2008	2011	18	128	16	10.66	0	0	86	1	1/7	60.00	2	0	
75	Miranda Veringmeier †	2008	2011	15	93	19	6.20	0	0	12	0	—	—	2	1	
76	Evelien Gerrits	2009	2011	3	11	6*	11.00	0	0	72	1	1/25	51.00	0	0	
77	Alarda Mol	2009	2011	4	9	4	2.25	0	0	—	—	—	—	1	0	
78	Esther Lanser	2010	2011	14	236	75	18.15	1	0	634	14	2/13	28.92	3	0	
79	Mariska Kornet	2010	2011	10	18	7	2.57	0	0	277	5	2/61	53.80	4	0	
80	Laura Brouwers	2010	2011	12	31	8	5.16	0	0	366	6	2/18	48.83	3	0	
81	Leonie Bennett	2011	2011	5	2	2*	1.00	0	0	162	4	3/20	34.25	0	0	
82	Kerry-Anne Tomlinson	2011	2011	4	77	34	19.25	0	0	191	2	2/30	82.50	3	0	
83	Gwen Bloemen	2022	2022	4	28	20	7.00	0	0	66	1	1/30	71.00	1	0	
84	Babette de Leede ‡†	2022	2026	15	416	76	27.73	4	0	—	—	—	—	14	5	
85	Eva Lynch	2022	2024	13	115	18	10.45	0	0	498	14	4/33	25.35	3	0	
86	Frederique Overdijk	2022	2026	14	224	47*	20.36	0	0	288	9	3/39	28.00	2	0	
87	Juliët Post	2022	2022	3	15	15	5.00	0	0	6	0	—	—	0	0	
88	Robine Rijke	2022	2026	14	256	83	18.28	2	0	168	6	3/30	19.33	6	0	
89	Silver Siegers	2022	2026	10	20	9*	6.66	0	0	354	12	3/42	26.50	0	0	
90	Annemijn van Beuge	2022	2024	7	68	30	9.71	0	0	181	8	5/37	19.75	2	0	
91	Isabel van der Woning	2022	2023	5	13	9*	6.50	0	0	120	2	1/28	68.00	0	0	
92	Jolien van Vliet	2022	2022	4	35	20	8.75	0	0	—	—	—	—	1	0	
93	Iris Zwilling	2022	2026	15	154	32	11.00	0	0	703	27	5/25	14.92	5	0	
94	Caroline de Lange	2022	2026	14	123	33	13.66	0	0	680	13	2/30	36.46	5	0	
95	Robyn van Oosterom	2022	2023	4	15	14	3.75	0	0	—	—	—	—	1	0	
96	Sterre Kalis	2022	2023	5	106	54	21.20	1	0	—	—	—	—	2	0	
97	Hannah Landheer	2022	2026	12	24	14	3.42	0	0	304	10	4/43	23.50	1	0	
98	Heather Siegers ‡	2022	2023	5	105	35	21.00	0	0	—	—	—	—	3	0	
99	Annemijn Thomson	2022	2024	2	16	10	8.00	0	0	30	0	4/43	21.00	0	0	
100	Phebe Molkenboer	2023	2026	8	249	106	31.12	1	1	18	1	1/10	10.00	6	0	
101	Carlijn van Koolwijk	2024	2026	4	25	19	8.33	0	0	48	1	1/30	30.00	0	0	
102	Sanya Khurana	2026	2026	2	50	46	25.00	0	0	66	1	1/32	50.00	0	0	
103	Myrthe van den Raad	2026	2026	2	1	1	1.00	0	0	47	2	1/21	24.00	0	0	
104	Merel Dekeling	2026	2026	1	12	12	12.00	0	0	—	—	—	—	0	0	
105	Rosalie Lawrence	2026	2026	1	0	0	0.00	0	0	—	—	—	—	0	0	
106	Lara Leemhhuis	2026	2026	1	4	4*	—	0	0	18	0	—	—	0	0	
