= Barbara Meihuizen =

Dutch cricketer

Personal information
- Full name: Barbara Meihuizen
- Role: Wicket-keeper

International information
- National side: Netherlands (1984)
- Only ODI (cap 5): 8 August 1984 v New Zealand

Career statistics
Competition	WODI
Matches	1
Runs scored	6
Batting average	6.00
100s/50s	0/0
Top score	6
Catches/stumpings	0/2
- Source: CricketArchive, 12 June 2021

Barbara Meihuizen is a Dutch former cricketer who played as a wicket-keeper. She appeared in one One Day International for the Netherlands in 1984, the team's first, against New Zealand. Batting at number 6, Offenberg scored 6 runs, as well as making two stumpings.

Meihuizen also played for the Netherlands on their tours of England in 1982 and 1985, playing against various club and county sides, and played in their Centenary Tournament in 1983.
