= Lonneke Offenberg =

Dutch cricketer

Personal information
- Full name: Lonneke Offenberg
- Role: Batter

International information
- National side: Netherlands (1984)
- Only ODI (cap 6): 8 August 1984 v New Zealand

Career statistics
Competition	WODI
Matches	1
Runs scored	1
Batting average	1.00
100s/50s	0/0
Top score	1
Catches/stumpings	0/–
- Source: CricketArchive, 12 June 2021

Lonneke Offenberg is a Dutch former cricketer who played as a batter. She appeared in one One Day International for the Netherlands in 1984, the team's first, against New Zealand. Batting at number 5, Offenberg scored 1 run in a 67 run defeat.

Offenberg also played for the Netherlands on their tours of England in 1981 and 1982, playing against various club and county sides, and in their Centenary Tournament in 1983.
