= Geeske Ludwig =

Dutch cricketer

Personal information
- Born: 5 December 1967 (age 58); Amsterdam, Netherlands
- Batting: Right-handed
- Bowling: Right-arm medium

International information
- National side: Netherlands (1989–1993)
- ODI debut (cap 22): 19 July 1989 v England
- Last ODI: 29 July 1993 v England

Career statistics
Competition	WODI
Matches	5
Runs scored	9
Batting average	2.25
100s/50s	0/0
Top score	2*
Catches/stumpings	0/–
- Source: CricketArchive, 19 October 2015

Geeske Ludwig (born 5 December 1967) is a former Dutch cricketer who played five One Day International (ODI) matches for the Dutch national side between 1989 and 1993, including at the 1993 World Cup.

Born in Amsterdam, Ludwig played her club cricket for Groen Geel and Rood en Wit. Her senior debut for the Netherlands came at the 1989 European Championship in Denmark. On debut against England, she opened the batting with Edmee Janss, making two runs from 39 balls. However, she was shifted lower down the order for the next match against Ireland, to number eight, and was at the crease when the winning runs were scored. Ludwig's next ODI came at the 1991 European Championship, against Denmark. She was selected in the Dutch squad for the 1993 World Cup in England, but played in only two of a possible seven matches, against New Zealand and England. Ludwig finished her ODI career with only nine runs from five matches, a batting average of 2.25, although she scored at least one run in every innings she played.
