= Esther Veltman =

Dutch cricketer (born 1966)

Personal information
- Born: 27 December 1966 (age 59); Oegstgeest
- Bowling: Left-arm medium
- Role: Bowler

International information
- National side: Netherlands (1985–1993)
- ODI debut (cap 18): 30 November 1988 v Ireland
- Last ODI: 29 July 1993 v England

Career statistics
Competition	WODI
Matches	19
Runs scored	91
Batting average	6.50
100s/50s	0/0
Top score	15
Balls bowled	1,094
Wickets	17
Bowling average	32.17
5 wickets in innings	0
10 wickets in match	0
Best bowling	4/26
Catches/stumpings	0/–
- Source: CricketArchive, 29 June 2015

Esther Veltman (born 27 December 1966) is a former Dutch cricketer whose international career for the Dutch national side spanned from 1985 to 1993. A left-arm medium-pacer, she played in 19 One Day International (ODI) matches, including games at both the 1988 and 1993 World Cups.

Veltman made her senior international debut at the age of 18, playing against Ireland and a WCA select team during a tour of England in 1985. Her ODI debut came at the 1988 World Cup in Australia, where she played in five of her team's eight matches. She took three wickets at the tournament, with a best of 2/32 against Ireland, and only Ingrid Dulfer-Keijzer and Dorine Loman managed more for the Netherlands (with four apiece). Veltman's next ODIs were played at the 1989, 1990, and 1991 editions of the European Championship. At the 1990 edition in England, she recorded career-best figures against Denmark, 4/26 from 11 overs. She put in another good performance at home the following year, taking 3/40 against England.

At the 1993 World Cup in England, Veltman played in six of a possible seven matches for the Netherlands. She took only three wickets, finishing with a bowling average of 48.33. However, against the West Indies, she starred with 2/22 from 12 overs, helping the Dutchwomen to an upset 70-run win over the West Indians. Veltman finished her ODI career after the World Cup, aged only 26, having taken 17 wickets in 19 matches. Unusually, she failed to record a single catch during her career.
