= Kelly Dulfer =

Dutch handball player (born 1994)

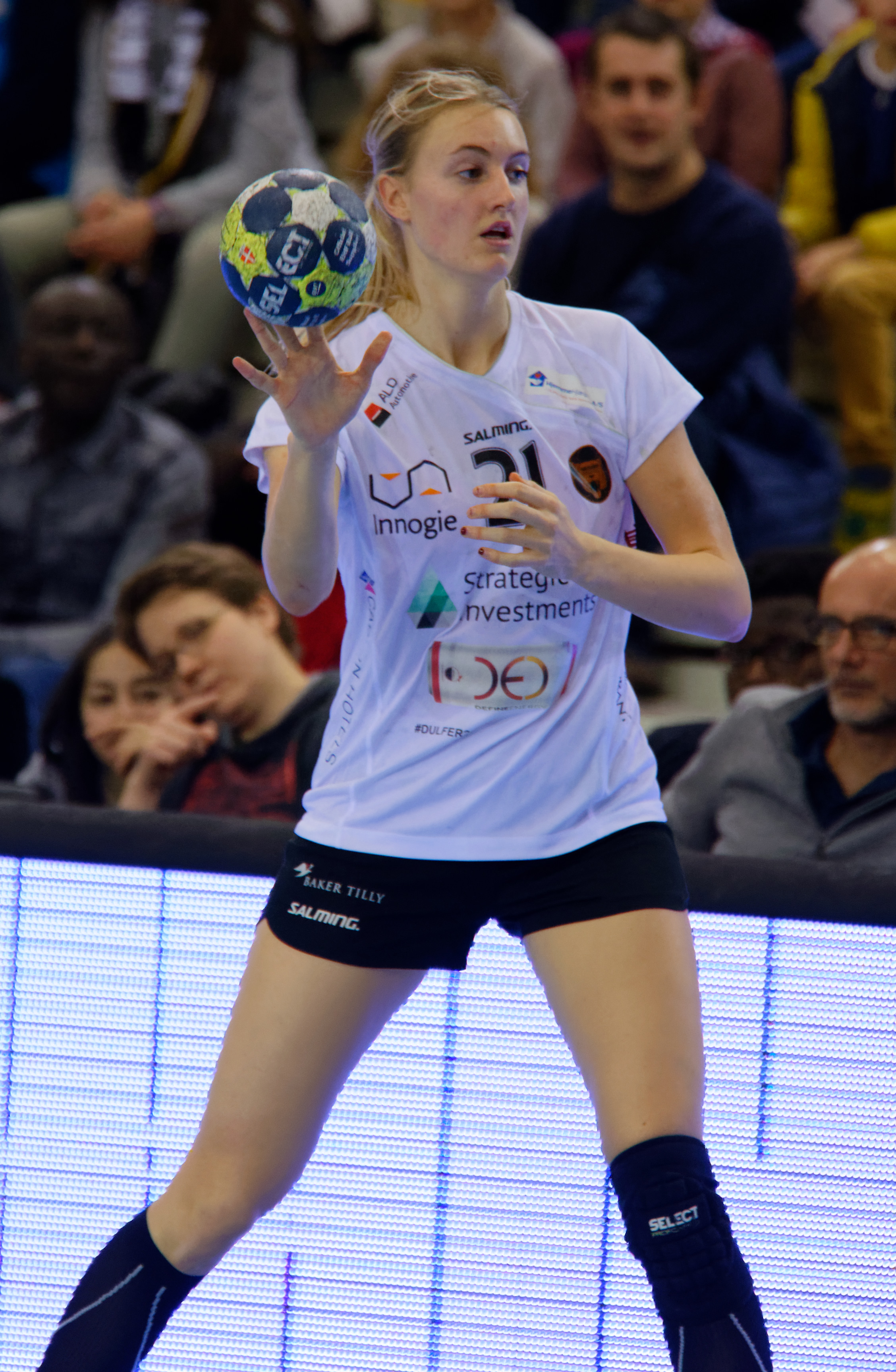
- Dulfer in 2018

Personal information
- Nationality: Dutch
- Born: 21 March 1994 (age 32) Schiedam, Netherlands
- Height: 1.85 m (6 ft 1 in)

Sport
- Sport: Handball
- Position: Left back
- Current club: Győri ETO KC
- Number: 17

Senior clubs
- Years: Team
- 2000–2009: HV Ventura
- 2009–2014: RKHV Quintus
- 2014–2015: SERCODAK Dalfsen
- 2015–2017: VfL Oldenburg
- 2017–2019: København Håndbold
- 2019–2021: Borussia Dortmund
- 2021–2024: SG BBM Bietigheim
- 2024–: Győri ETO KC
National team
Years	Team	Apps	(Gls)
2013–	Netherlands	213	(342)
Medal record
World Championship
Gold medal – first place	2019 Japan
Silver medal – second place	2015 Denmark
Bronze medal – third place	2017 Germany
European Championship
Silver medal – second place	2016 Sweden
Bronze medal – third place	2018 France
- Updated on 14 December 2025

Kelly Dulfer (born 21 March 1994) is a Dutch handball player for Győri ETO KC and the Dutch national team. She normally plays left back, but is known to be a very versatile player.

She was a part the Netherlands team that won the 2019 World Women's Handball Championship; the first title in the country's history.

== Career ==
Dulfer started playing handball at HV Ventura. In 2012 she joined HV Quintus and a year later she joined HV DOS.

In the 2014–15 season she played for SERCODAK Dalfsen, where she won the Dutch League and Dutch cup.

The season after she joined German Bundesliga team VfL Oldenburg. In two seasons at the club she played 51 Bundesliga games, scoring 182 gaols.

In 2017 she joined Danish side København Håndbold. In 2018 she won the Danish Championship; the first title in the history of the club.

In the summer of 2019 she returned to Germany to join Borussia Dortmund. Here she won the 2021 German championship. In summer 2021 she joined league rivals SG BBM Bietigheim. Here she won the 2021, 2022 and 2023 DHB Supercup, the 2022, 2023 and 2024 German championship, the 2022 European League and the 2023 DHB-Pokal.

In 2024 she joined Hungarian side Győri ETO KC.

=== National team ===
Dulfer debuted for the Dutch national team on 23 October 2013, against Italy, while still playing in the Netherlands.

She competed for the national team in the 2013 Møbelringen Cup in Norway. She represented the Netherlands at the 2013 World Women's Handball Championship in Serbia, where she was selected to play the position of centre back on the Dutch team. She made her World Championship debut in the opening match against the Dominican Republic, and scored one goal in the game, which was won 44–21 by the "Oranje" team.

In 2012, she played at the Women's Youth World Handball Championship in Montenegro, where the Dutch team placed tenth.

At the 2015 World Championship and 2016 European Championship she won silver medals with the Dutch team on both occasions.

At the 2016 Olympics she was also in the Dutch team.

At the 2018 European championship she won bronze medals with the Dutch team and was selected for the tournament all-star team as best defender. During the tournament she played mainly as a pivot instead her normal back position.

Her greatest achievement came at the 2019 World Championship in Japan, where she and the Netherlands won gold medals, beating Spain in the final 30:29

At the 2020 Olympics she was also part of the Dutch team. At the 2023 World Championship she finished 5th with the Dutch team, scoring 13 goals.

== Private life ==
Dulfer is the daughter of the Dutch international cricketers Eric Dulfer and Ingrid Keijzer.

== Achievements ==
=== National team ===
- World Championship:
  - Silver Medalist: 2015
  - Bronze Medalist: 2017
  - Gold Medalist: 2019
- European Championship:
  - Silver Medalist: 2016
  - Bronze Medalist: 2018

=== Domestic competitions ===
- Danish Championship:
  - Winner: 2018
- Danish Cup:
  - Runner-up: 2017
- DHB Supercup:
  - Winner: 2021, 2022, 2023
- DHB-Pokal:
  - Winner: 2022, 2023
- Bundesliga:
  - Winner: 2021, 2022, 2023
- Dutch Eredivisie
  - Winner: 2015
- NHV Cup
  - Winner: 2015
- Dutch Supercup
  - Winner: 2015
- Nemzeti Bajnokság I:
  - Winner: 2025

=== International competitions ===
- EHF Champions League:
  - Winner: 2025
  - silver medalist: 2024
- EHF European League:
  - Winner: 2022

== Individual awards ==
- All-Star Best Defender of the European Championship: 2018
- HTH Ligaen's Player of the Month: November 2018 and February 2019
