= Gwynneth Smith =

Irish cricketer (born 1965)

Personal information
- Born: 1965 (age 60–61); Ireland
- Source: ESPNcricinfo, 26 October 2016

Gwynneth Smith (born 1965) is an Irish former cricketer. She played eight Women's One Day International matches for Ireland women's cricket team. She was part of Ireland's squad for the 1988 Women's Cricket World Cup.
