= Liesbeth Vernout =

Dutch cricketer (born 1958)

Personal information
- Born: 1958 (age 67–68)

International information
- National side: Netherlands
- ODI debut (cap 11): 8 August 1984 v New Zealand
- Last ODI: 16 December 1988 v England
- Source: ESPNcricinfo, 25 October 2016

Liesbeth Vernout (born 1958) is a Dutch former cricketer. She played eight Women's One Day International matches for the Netherlands women's national cricket team. She was part of the Netherlands squad for the 1988 Women's Cricket World Cup.
