= Lindsay Reeler =

Australian cricketer

Personal information
- Full name: Lindsay Anne Reeler
- Born: 18 March 1961; Northern Rhodesia
- Died: 17 April 2024 (aged 63)
- Batting: Right-handed
- Bowling: Right-arm medium
- Role: Batter

International information
- National side: Australia (1984–1988)
- Test debut (cap 95): 21 January 1984 v India
- Last Test: 29 August 1987 v England
- ODI debut (cap 38): 19 January 1984 v India
- Last ODI: 18 December 1988 v England

Domestic team information
- Years: Team
- 1980/81–1987/88: New South Wales

Career statistics
Competition	WTest	WODI	WFC	WLA
Matches	10	23	31	51
Runs scored	510	1,034	1,175	1,992
Batting average	39.23	57.44	33.57	46.32
100s/50s	1/3	2/8	2/8	6/11
Top score	110*	143*	164	163*
Balls bowled	168	–	322	6
Wickets	2	–	6	0
Bowling average	42.00	–	27.00	–
5 wickets in innings	0	–	0	0
10 wickets in match	0	–	0	0
Best bowling	2/27	–	2/27	–
Catches/stumpings	12/–	10/–	19/–	21/–
- Source: CricketArchive, 30 January 2023

Lindsay Anne Reeler (18 March 1961 – 17 April 2024) was an Australian cricketer who played as a right-handed batter and occasional right-arm medium bowler. She appeared in 10 Test matches and 23 One Day Internationals for Australia between 1984 and 1988. She scored a century against England in her penultimate Test match in August 1987. She was the first woman to score 1,000 runs in ODIs for Australia, and her final WODI appearance was in the final of the 1988 Women's Cricket World Cup. She played domestic cricket for New South Wales.

== Early career ==
Reeler and her family moved from Zambia to Sydney, Australia, when she was 10 years old. Urged by her father, Ian, to take up cricket, she did not start playing until she was 15, and then lacked the self-discipline truly to progress. A move to opening the batting changed that, and gave her the self-confidence to improve. As a teenager, she played for Ravenswood, but craving greater competition, she trained and played with the boys at nearby Barker College. She appeared for New South Wales Breakers at the age of 19, taking one wicket and scoring five runs in a drawn two-day match with South Australia. She made just three appearances in her maiden season, all coming in January 1981.

The following season Reeler played in all but one of New South Wales' ten Australian Women's Cricket Championships matches, and she was rewarded with her first half-century for the state, as she top-scored with 53 against Western Australia. The 1982/83 season saw her average drop to 9.00, as she scored 36 runs in her four matches, but in 1983/84 she hit far better form. In her opening match of the season, she scored 70 to help New South Wales set a first-innings declaration total of 166, although opponents Queensland rallied with 277 in their second innings and the match finished in a draw. Two matches later, she hit 164 runs in 236 minutes, including 22 fours against Australian Capital Territory.

== International career ==
Fifteen days after her century for New South Wales, Reeler made her international debut for Australia during their tour of India. Batting at number four, she was named Player of the Match as she scored 60 runs and put on 80 with Trish Dawson for the fourth-wicket, helping her team to chase down the Indian total. She opened the batting for Australia for the remainder of the tour, adding 85 further ODI runs and trailing only Dawson in ODI runs in the series. Her Test debut came in the same series, where she performed solidly but less emphatically. Opening the batting alongside Peta Verco in five of her six innings, Reeler scored 148 runs without making a half-century and trailed her opening partner by some way in the batting charts for the series. She didn't play in the first two Tests against the touring English the following summer, but on her return in the Third Test made her maiden half-century in 146 balls. She failed to reach 50 in the final two Tests or the three-match ODI series, and did not appear in the subsequent series against New Zealand.

In 1987 Reeler was selected as part of the squad to tour the British Isles, and in the first ODI against Ireland she hit a match-winning 83 runs as Australia won by 110 runs. After missing the second Test, she again made a match-winning performance, passing her previous score to record 84 runs in a 105 run victory. A score of 109 in a warm-up match against Surrey Women was her first century for Australia, and she made half-centuries in the first and third ODIs of the series. After a score of 3 in her solitary innings in the First Test, Reeler struggled in two matches against West and West Midlands Women.

A century against a North Women side containing England captain Carole Hodges and wicketkeeper Jane Powell helped secure an Australian 166 run victory just four days before the Second Test. Reeler opened the batting in the Second Test as Australia chased an English first-innings total of 201. After losing the early wickets of Denise Emerson and Belinda Haggett, Reeler was joined at the crease by Denise Annetts. The pair put on a women's Test record partnership of 309 runs, Reeler finishing on 110 not out and Annetts on 193.

The following year, Reeler was one of the stars of the 1988 Women's Cricket World Cup, which was held in and won by Australia. During that tournament, she scored a 448 runs at an average of 149, including two centuries and two half-centuries. Her unbeaten 143 in Australia's first match, against the Netherlands, was, at the time, the highest ever score in Women's One-Day Internationals. In the final against England, in what turned out to be her last innings for Australia, she made an unbeaten 59.

Soon afterwards, Reeler was forced to retire from international cricket at the premature age of 27, due to a progressively worsening left knee injury she had suffered in an off-field accident ten years earlier.
