= Anne Linehan =

Irish cricketer

Personal information
- Full name: Anne Margaret Linehan
- Born: 7 October 1973 (age 53); Downpatrick, Northern Ireland
- Batting: Left-handed
- Bowling: Right-arm medium
- Role: Wicket-keeper

International information
- National side: Ireland (1989–2008)
- Only Test (cap 4): 30 July 2000 v Pakistan
- ODI debut (cap 19): 19 July 1989 v Denmark
- Last ODI: 18 February 2008 v Pakistan

Career statistics
Competition	WTest	WODI	WLA
Matches	1	60	62
Runs scored	27	699	714
Batting average	–	14.26	14.28
100s/50s	0/0	0/3	0/3
Top score	27*	74	74
Balls bowled	–	300	300
Wickets	–	5	5
Bowling average	–	38.60	38.60
5 wickets in innings	–	0	0
10 wickets in match	–	0	0
Best bowling	–	2/28	2/28
Catches/stumpings	1/0	18/9	18/9
- Source: CricketArchive, 1 December 2021

Anne Margaret Linehan (born 7 October 1973) is a Northern Irish former cricketer who played as a left-handed batter and wicket-keeper. She appeared in one Test match and 60 One Day Internationals (ODIs) for Ireland between 1989 and 2008. She has the seventh longest career in ODI matches.

Linehan was born in Downpatrick, Northern Ireland, and played most of her club cricket for Downpatrick Cricket Club. She made her international debut at the 1989 European Cup in Denmark, and took four wickets at the tournament, including 2/28 against England. Linehan initially played as an all-rounder, bowling right-arm medium pace, but after the 1990 European Cup did not bowl again at international level. At the 1991 edition of the tournament, hosted by the Netherlands, she made her debut as Ireland's wicket-keeper. However, after that she did not again appear for the national team until 1995, missing the opportunity to play at the 1993 World Cup.

At the 1995 European Cup, Linehan scored two half-centuries – 74 against Denmark and 56 against the Netherlands – with only her teammate Mary-Pat Moore scoring more runs. Against Denmark, she and Moore put on 181 runs for the opening wicket, an Irish record. Although by then a regular in Ireland's team, Linehan did not play at the 1997 World Cup in India. During the late 1990s, she often played solely as a batsman, with Sandra Dawson taking on the wicket-keeping duties. In July 2000, Linehan was selected in Ireland's squad for its inaugural (and, so far, only) Test match, against Pakistan. She made 27 not out batting fifth in Ireland's only innings, as her team won by an innings and 54 runs.

Linehan finally made her World Cup debut at the 2000 event in New Zealand, playing in all seven of her team's matches. Against the Netherlands, she scored the third and final half-century of her ODI career, 54 runs from 68 balls. Linehan was appointed Ireland's captain for the 2002 season, and during that time skippered the side in five ODIs – three against New Zealand and two against India. She played a second World Cup for Ireland in 2005, and finished her international career at the 2008 World Cup Qualifier, aged 34. Linehan played 60 ODIs during her career, ranking her fifth for her country, and scored 699 runs, ranking her seventh.
