= Susanne Jørgensen =

Danish cricketer

Susanne Jorgensen
Personal information
- Full name: Susanne Jorgensen
- Role: Wicket-keeper

International information
- National side: Denmark
- ODI debut (cap 5): 19 July 1989 v Ireland
- Last ODI: 20 July 1989 v England

Career statistics
| Competition | WODI |
|---|---|
| Matches | 2 |
| Runs scored | 8 |
| Batting average | 4.00 |
| 100s/50s | 0/0 |
| Top score | 4 |
| Catches/stumpings | 1/0 |
- Source: Cricinfo, 25 September 2020

Susanne Jorgensen is a former women's cricketer for the Denmark national women's cricket team who played two ODIs during the 1989 Women's European Cricket Cup. A wicket-keeper batsman, she scored eight runs across two innings, scoring four runs in each match. She also took one catch.
