= Lilli Laursen =

Danish cricketer

Personal information
- Full name: Lilli Laursen
- Role: Opening batsman

International information
- National side: Denmark
- ODI debut (cap 7): 19 July 1989 v Ireland
- Last ODI: 21 July 1989 v Netherlands

Career statistics
Competition	WODI
Matches	3
Runs scored	41
Batting average	13.66
100s/50s	0/0
Top score	24
Catches/stumpings	0/0
- Source: ESPNcricinfo, 26 September 2020

Lilli Laursen is a former women's cricketer for the Denmark national women's cricket team who played three ODIs during the 1989 Women's European Cricket Cup. She scored 41 runs, including 24 on her debut, against Ireland.
