= Saskia Keijzer-Klein =

Dutch cricketer

Personal information
- Full name: Saskia Keijzer-Klein
- Role: Bowler

International information
- National side: Netherlands (1984)
- Only ODI (cap 3): 8 August 1984 v New Zealand

Career statistics
Competition	WODI
Matches	1
Runs scored	4
Batting average	4.00
100s/50s	0/0
Top score	4
Balls bowled	60
Wickets	0
Bowling average	–
5 wickets in innings	0
10 wickets in match	0
Best bowling	–
Catches/stumpings	0/–
- Source: CricketArchive, 12 June 2021

Saskia Keijzer-Klein (née Klein) is a Dutch former cricketer who played primarily as a bowler. She appeared in one One Day International for the Netherlands in 1984, the team's first, against New Zealand. Opening the bowling, Keijzer-Klein took 0/38 from 10 overs, as well as batting at number 7 and scoring 4 runs.
