= Mickey de Boer =

Dutch cricketer

Personal information
- Full name: Mickey de Boer
- Batting: Right-handed
- Bowling: Right-arm off break
- Role: All-rounder

International information
- National side: Netherlands (1984)
- Only ODI (cap 1): 8 August 1984 v New Zealand

Career statistics
Competition	WODI	WLA
Matches	1	6
Runs scored	8	93
Batting average	8.00	93.00
100s/50s	0/0	0/1
Top score	8*	62*
Balls bowled	66	96
Wickets	1	1
Bowling average	40.00	76.00
5 wickets in innings	0	0
10 wickets in match	0	0
Best bowling	1/40	1/40
Catches/stumpings	0/–	1/–
- Source: Cricinfo, 20 April 2022

Mickey de Boer is a Dutch former cricketer who played as a right-handed batter and right-arm off break bowler. She appeared in one One Day International for the Netherlands, against New Zealand at Haarlem on 8 August 1984, scoring 8* and taking 1 for 40 in 11 overs. She played domestic cricket for Kent.
