= Chantal Grevers =

Dutch cricketer

Personal information
- Born: 1961 (age 64–65)
- Bowling: Left-arm medium
- Role: Bowler

International information
- National side: Netherlands (1979–1990)
- ODI debut (cap 2): 8 August 1984 v New Zealand
- Last ODI: 20 July 1990 v Denmark

Career statistics
Competition	WODI
Matches	13
Runs scored	69
Batting average	6.27
100s/50s	0/0
Top score	26
Balls bowled	600
Wickets	7
Bowling average	48.85
5 wickets in innings	0
10 wickets in match	0
Best bowling	3/10
Catches/stumpings	5/–
- Source: CricketArchive, 29 August 2015

Chantal Grevers (born 1961) is a former Dutch cricketer whose international career for the Dutch national side spanned from 1979 to 1990. A left-arm medium-pace bowler, she played thirteen One Day International (ODI) matches, including games at the 1988 World Cup.

Grevers made her Dutch senior debut in 1979, as a teenager, playing two games against a touring Junior England team (not to be confused with the Young England team). She toured England with the Dutch team in both 1980 and 1982, and in 1983 played matches against Denmark and Ireland in the one-off Centenary Tournament at Utrecht's Sportpark Maarschalkerweerd. In 1984, the Netherlands played its first ODI, a one-off game against New Zealand for the 50th anniversary of the Nederlandse Dames Cricket Bond. Grevers was selected for the match, and took the wicket of Di Caird, finishing with 1/27 from 11 overs.

The Netherlands played no further ODIs until the 1988 World Cup, but did play frequently against other European sides, including at the 1986 Quadrangular Tournament in Ireland (featuring Denmark, England A, and Ireland). In that competition, Grevers recorded figures of 4/30 from 12 overs against Denmark, which was only bettered by Elaine Wulcko (taking 5/9 for England A against Denmark). At the 1988 World Cup in Australia, Grevers took only two wickets from her seven matches, and finishing with a bowling average of 121.50, the worst of any player. Normally a tail-end batsman, against Ireland she came in seventh in the batting order, with the score at 37/5, and proceeded to put on 52 runs for the sixth wicket with Vanda Wesenhagen, eventually being dismissed for 26. Their partnership remained a Dutch sixth-wicket record in ODIs until 2005, when Maartje Köster and Marijn Nijman put on 66, also against Ireland.

Grevers next played at ODI level at the 1989 European Championship in Denmark, which had been granted that status for the first time. She went wicketless in her first game, against England, but against Denmark took the first three wickets to fall, finishing with career-best figures of 3/10 from 11 overs (including seven maidens). She also topscored in that match with 24 not out in a team total of 135 all out, despite coming in ninth in the batting order. Grevers' final ODIs came at the 1990 edition of the same tournament, when she was aged in her late twenties. However, in three matches, she took only a single wicket, finishing with 1/15 against Denmark. Grevers finished her ODI career having taken seven wickets from 13 matches, at an average of 48.85, an economy rate of 3.42, and a strike rate of 85.71 (close to one wicket for every 14 overs bowled).
