= Brigit Legg =

New Zealand cricketer (born 1964)

Personal information
- Full name: Brigit Jane Legg
- Born: 29 June 1964 (age 62); Christchurch, New Zealand
- Batting: Right-handed
- Bowling: Right-arm medium
- Role: Bowler

International information
- National side: New Zealand (1987–1990)
- Test debut (cap 92): 18 January 1990 v Australia
- Last Test: 1 February 1990 v Australia
- ODI debut (cap 45): 18 January 1987 v Australia
- Last ODI: 11 February 1990 v Australia

Domestic team information
- Years: Team
- 1982/83–1991/92: Canterbury

Career statistics
Competition	WTest	WODI	WFC	WLA
Matches	3	18	30	34
Runs scored	30	79	396	176
Batting average	10.00	7.90	26.40	11.73
100s/50s	0/0	0/0	0/0	0/0
Top score	26	17	41*	39
Balls bowled	546	1,198	2,268	2,107
Wickets	4	20	46	48
Bowling average	37.25	19.70	15.21	12.33
5 wickets in innings	0	0	1	0
10 wickets in match	0	0	0	0
Best bowling	2/57	3/4	6/32	3/4
Catches/stumpings	0/–	2/–	13/–	5/–
- Source: CricketArchive, 28 April 2021

Brigit Jane Legg (born 29 June 1964) is a New Zealand former cricketer who played as a right-arm medium bowler. She appeared in 3 Test matches and 18 One Day Internationals for New Zealand between 1987 and 1990. She played domestic cricket for Canterbury.

Legg has a 1985 Diploma in Parks and Recreation from the University of Canterbury with a thesis titled Employee recreation and services in industry.
