= Jet van Noortwijk =

Dutch cricketer

Personal information
- Full name: Ariette Josephine van Noortwijk
- Born: 11 May 1968 (age 58)
- Batting: Right-handed
- Bowling: Right-arm medium
- Role: All-rounder

International information
- National side: Netherlands (1989–1997)
- ODI debut (cap 23): 19 July 1989 v England
- Last ODI: 20 December 1997 v Australia

Domestic team information
- Years: Team
- 1993–1999: Yorkshire

Career statistics
Competition	WODI
Matches	27
Runs scored	324
Batting average	14.08
100s/50s	0/1
Top score	52
Balls bowled	1,028
Wickets	24
Bowling average	19.33
5 wickets in innings	0
10 wickets in match	0
Best bowling	4/21
Catches/stumpings	4/–
- Source: Cricinfo, 29 June 2015

Ariette "Jet" van Noortwijk (born 11 May 1968) is a Dutch former cricketer whose international career for the Dutch national side spanned from 1989 to 1997. She finished her career with 27 One Day International (ODI) matches, including games at both the 1993 and 1997 World Cups.

Van Noortwijk made her ODI debut at the 1989 European Championship, aged 18. A right-handed all-rounder, on debut against England she scored 46 not out in her team's innings of 91/7 from 55 overs, the only Dutch batsman to pass double figures. She also took 2/28 with her medium-pace bowling in the same match, which was followed by 3/21 in the next game against Ireland. Van Noortwijk also featured in the 1990 and 1991 editions of the tournament, with a notable performance being 3/13 against Denmark in the opening game of the 1991 tournament, helping her side to a narrow four-run victory.

At the 1993 World Cup in England, the next major tournament for the Dutch team, van Noortwijk played in all seven matches. There, she recorded what were to be career-best figures for both batting and bowling – 52 against Ireland and 4/21 against Denmark, at the time the fourth-best ODI figures by a Dutchwoman. Van Noortwijk finished her ODI career after the 1997 World Cup in India, despite being only 27. Against India in that tournament, she was named player of match after finishing with 4/25 from her eight overs, although that was not enough to prevent the Netherlands losing by 93 runs.

Outside of her international career, Van Noortwijk began playing for Yorkshire, an English domestic team, in 1993, and continued until 1999, in what is now the Women's County Championship. She finished her ODI career with 21 wickets from 27 games, surpassing Ingrid Dulfer-Keijzer's record for the most wickets taken for the Netherlands, which has since been beaten by Carolien Salomons, Sandra Kottman, Caroline de Fouw, and Cheraldine Oudolf. Van Noortwijk and Dulfer-Keijzer are the only Dutch players to record four or more wickets in an ODI innings more than once.
