= Gillian McCall =

Irish cricketer

Personal information
- Full name: Gillian McCall

International information
- National side: Ireland

Career statistics
Competition	WODI
Matches	2
Runs scored	9
Batting average	9.00
100s/50s	0/0
Top score	5
Balls bowled	12
Wickets	0
Bowling average	–
5 wickets in innings	–
10 wickets in match	–
Best bowling	–
Catches/stumpings	0/0
- Source: Cricinfo, 24 November 2017

Gillian McCall is a former Irish woman cricketer. She has played for Ireland in 2 Women's ODIs. She has represented Irish women's cricket team at the 1990 Women's European Cricket Cup and in the 1991 Women's European Cricket Cup.
