= Great Oakley Cricket Club Ground =

Cricket ground in Great Oakley, England

Coordinates: 52.46697°N 0.71931°W

Ground information
- Location: Great Oakley, Northamptonshire
- Establishment: 1960 (first recorded match)

International information
- Only WODI: 22 July 1990: England v Ireland
- As of 6 September 2020; Source: Ground profile

Great Oakley Cricket Club Ground is a cricket ground in Great Oakley, Northamptonshire. The first recorded match on the ground was in 1960, when the ground held Northamptonshire Second XI played the Surrey Second XI in the Second XI Championship. The ground has played host to a total of 14 Second XI fixtures involving the Northamptonshire Second XI.

In 1990, the ground held a single Women's One Day International between England women and Ireland women.

In local domestic cricket, the ground is the home venue of Great Oakley Cricket Club.
