= Helen Hearnden =

Irish cricketer (born 1954)

Personal information
- Born: 28 November 1954 (age 71); Mullingar, Ireland
- Source: ESPNcricinfo, 26 October 2016

Helen Hearnden (born 25 November 1954) is an Irish former cricketer. She played three Women's One Day International matches for Ireland women's cricket team. She was part of Ireland's squad for the 1988 Women's Cricket World Cup.
