= Charlotte Corneliussen =

Danish cricketer

Personal information
- Full name: Charlotte Corneliussen
- Role: Wicket-keeper

International information
- National side: Denmark
- ODI debut (cap 12): 20 July 1989 v England
- Last ODI: 21 July 1989 v Netherlands

Career statistics
Competition	WODI
Matches	2
Runs scored	15
Batting average	7.50
100s/50s	0/0
Top score	10
Catches/stumpings	2/2
- Source: ESPNcricinfo, 26 September 2020

Charlotte Corneliussen is a former women's cricketer for the Denmark national women's cricket team who played two ODIs during the 1989 Women's European Cricket Cup. A wicket-keeper batsman, she scored 15 runs in her two innings, took two catches and two stumpings.
