= Isabelle van Dishoeck =

Dutch cricketer (born 1953)

Personal information
- Full name: Isabelle Koppe-van Dishoeck
- Born: 1953 (age 72–73); Netherlands
- Role: Wicket-keeper

International information
- National side: Netherlands (1988)
- ODI debut (cap 16): 29 November 1988 v Australia
- Last ODI: 14 December 1988 v Australia

Career statistics
Competition	WODI
Matches	6
Runs scored	8
Batting average	8.00
100s/50s	0/0
Top score	4*
Catches/stumpings	3/0
- Source: ESPNcricinfo, 9 December 2022

Isabelle Koppe-van Dishoeck (born 1953) is a Dutch former cricketer who played as a wicket-keeper. She appeared for Netherlands in six One Day Internationals, all at the 1988 Women's Cricket World Cup in Australia. She took three catches and scored eight runs in five innings as her side finished bottom of the table, failing to win any matches.
