= Ingrid Keijzer =

Dutch cricketer and handball player (born 1964)

Personal information
- Full name: Ingrid Keijzer
- Born: 22 July 1964 (age 62); Netherlands
- Batting: Right-handed
- Bowling: Right-arm medium
- Role: Bowler

International information
- National side: Netherlands (1983–1993)
- ODI debut (cap 14): 29 November 1988 v Australia
- Last ODI: 28 July 1993 v Ireland
- Source: CricketArchive, 14 April 2016

Ingrid Keijzer (married name Dulfer-Keijzer; born 22 July 1964) is a former Dutch sportswoman who played both handball and cricket at international level. She represented the Netherlands women's national cricket team between 1983 and 1993, including as captain between 1989 and 1990. She played as a right-arm medium-pace bowler.

== Cricket career ==
Keijzer made her international debut for the Netherlands in August 1984, against a Women's Cricket Association XI touring from England. In 1987, she represented the Netherlands in a three-day match against Ireland (an unofficial Test), opening the bowling with Dorine Loman. Keijzer made her One Day International (ODI) debut at the 1988 World Cup in Australia. She was one of only three Dutch players to appear in every match, along with Anita van Lier and Irene Schoof, and was the equal leading wicket-taker for the Netherlands, with Dorine Loman.

Having taken over from Anita van Lier as captain after the World Cup, Keijzer's next ODI appearances came at the 1989 European Cup, where she took six wickets (including 4/20 against Denmark) to finish as her team's leading wicket-taker (and equal third overall). She was also one of the leading bowlers at the 1990 European Cup, ranking second behind Ireland's Susan Bray for wickets taken, and recording career-best figures of 4/14 against Denmark. Keijzer's final international tournament was the 1993 World Cup in England, by which time she had been replaced as captain. She took four wickets from her six matches at the tournament, with a best of 2/20 against Ireland.

== Handball career ==
Keijzer also played for the Netherlands women's national handball team. She made her international debut against Tunisia in June 1989.

== Personal life ==
Keijzer married fellow international cricketer Eric Dulfer and is the mother of the handball player Kelly Dulfer.
