= Leicester Ivanhoe Cricket Club Ground =

Cricket ground in Kirby Muxloe, Leicestershire, England

Coordinates: 52.6190°N 1.2344°W

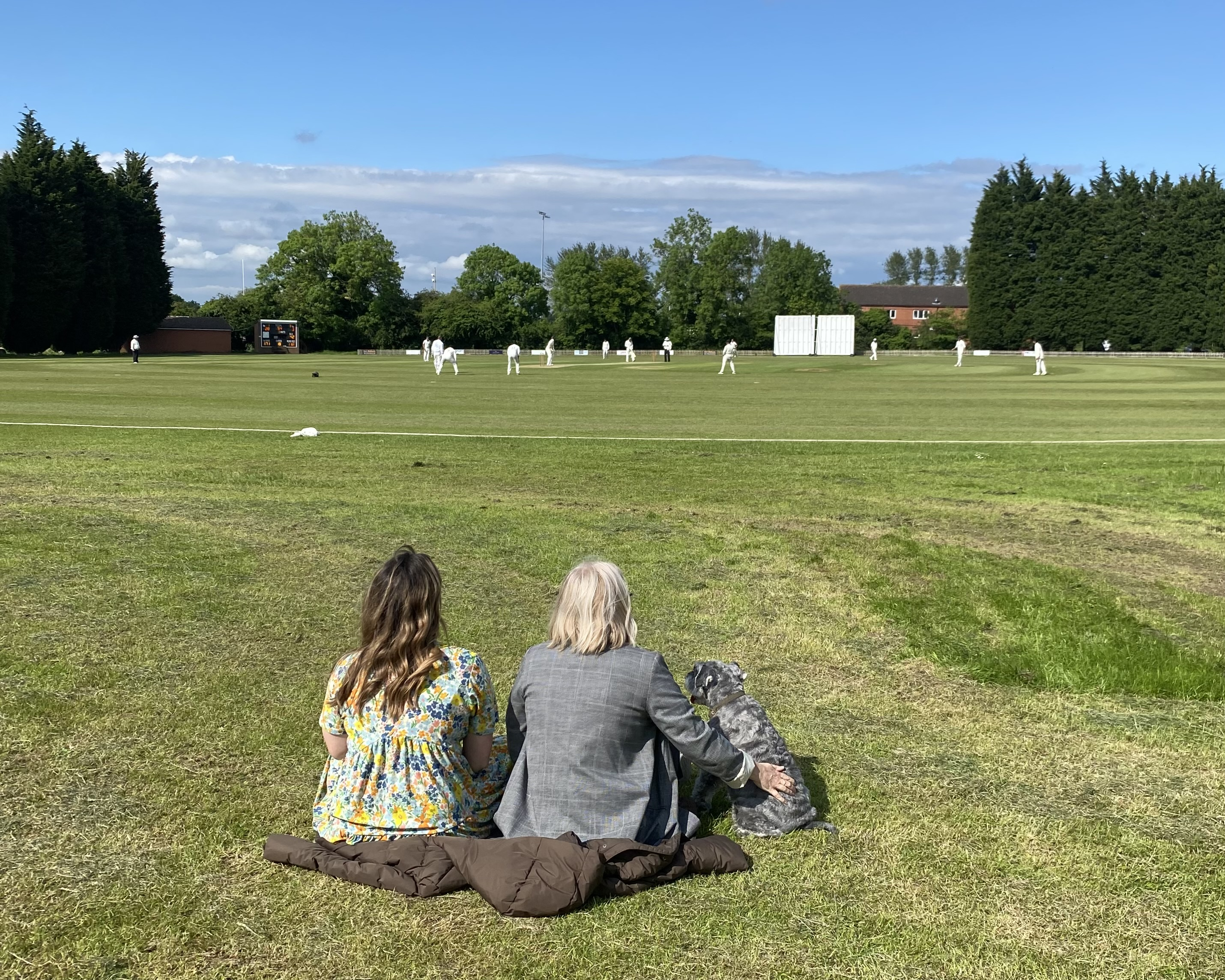
- Interactive map of Leicester Ivanhoe Cricket Club Ground

Ground information
- Location: Kirby Muxloe, Leicestershire
- Country: England
- Establishment: 1952 (first recorded match)

International information
- First women's ODI: 14 July 1973: England v International XI
- Last women's ODI: 20 July 1990: England v Ireland
- As of 6 September 2020; Source: Ground profile

Leicester Ivanhoe Cricket Club Ground is a cricket ground in Kirby Muxloe, Leicestershire. The first recorded match on the ground was in 1952, when the Leicestershire Second XI played the Nottinghamshire Second XI. In addition, the ground has also held two Second XI Championship matches.

The ground hosted its first Women's One Day International (ODI) in the 1973 Women's Cricket World Cup between International XI women and Jamaica women. The next two Women's ODIs staged were in the 1990 Women's European Championship when Denmark women played Ireland women and finally with England women playing Ireland women, in what is to date the final Women's ODI held at the ground.

In local domestic cricket, the ground is the home venue of Leicester Ivanhoe Cricket Club who play in the Leicestershire Premier Cricket League.
