= Janice Walsh =

Irish cricketer (born 1961)

Personal information
- Born: 17 December 1961 (age 64); Dublin, Ireland
- Source: ESPNcricinfo, 26 October 2016

Janice Walsh (born 17 December 1961) is an Irish former cricketer. She played fourteen Women's One Day International matches for Ireland women's cricket team. She was part of Ireland's squad for the 1988 Women's Cricket World Cup.
