= Jane Powell (cricketer) =

English cricketer (born 1957)

Personal information
- Born: 19 January 1957 (age 69); Sheffield, Yorkshire, England
- Batting: Right-handed
- Bowling: Right-arm medium
- Role: Batter; occasional wicket-keeper
- Relatives: Jill Powell (twin sister)

International information
- National side: England
- Test debut (cap 95): 27 July 1984 v New Zealand
- Last Test: 29 August 1987 v Australia
- ODI debut (cap 37): 24 June 1984 v New Zealand
- Last ODI: 22 July 1990 v Ireland

Domestic team information
- Years: Team
- 1976–1978: Sussex
- 1980–1991: Yorkshire
- 1981–1982: East Anglia

Career statistics
Competition	WTest	WODI	WFC	WLA
Matches	6	24	19	81
Runs scored	281	463	535	1,688
Batting average	35.12	33.07	21.40	28.61
100s/50s	1/0	0/2	1/0	0/8
Top score	115*	98*	115*	98*
Balls bowled	0	0	179	120
Wickets	–	–	2	4
Bowling average	–	–	29.00	11.75
5 wickets in innings	–	–	0	0
10 wickets in match	–	–	0	0
Best bowling	–	–	2/42	2/14
Catches/stumpings	1/0	7/–	8/–	19/0
- Source: CricketArchive, 7 July 2023

Jane Powell (born 19 January 1957) is an English former cricketer who played as a right-handed batter. She was elected as the first female President of Yorkshire County Cricket Club in 2023.

== Playing career ==
She played in six Test matches and 24 One Day Internationals, with a highest score of 115* against India. Powell was captain of England at the 1988 Women's Cricket World Cup, losing in the Final to Australia. She also captained England to Women's European Cricket Championship titles in 1989 and 1990. Her twin sister Jill also represented England. She mainly played domestic cricket for Yorkshire, but also appeared in matches for Sussex and East Anglia.

After retiring from playing, Powell coached the England team during the 2002–03 tour of Australia, as well as being a successful hockey coach.
