= Julie Logue =

Irish cricketer (born 1971)

Personal information
- Full name: Julie Logue
- Born: 1971 (age 54–55); Ireland
- Batting: Right-handed
- Bowling: Right-arm medium
- Role: Wicket-keeper

Domestic team information
- Years: Team
- 2017: Scorchers

Career statistics
| Competition | WODI | WLA |
|---|---|---|
| Matches | 19 | 21 |
| Runs scored | 106 | 109 |
| Batting average | 11.77 | 12.11 |
| 100s/50s | 0/0 | 0/0 |
| Top score | 28* | 28* |
| Balls bowled | 96 | 96 |
| Wickets | 3 | 3 |
| Bowling average | 31.00 | 31.00 |
| 5 wickets in innings | 0 | 0 |
| 10 wickets in match | 0 | 0 |
| Best bowling | 3/33 | 3/33 |
| Catches/stumpings | 5/4 | 6/5 |
- Source: CricketArchive, 27 May 2021

Julie Logue (born 1971) is an Irish former cricketer who played as a right-handed batter and wicket-keeper. She appeared in 19 One Day Internationals for Ireland between 1988 and 1996, including being part of Ireland's squad for the 1988 Women's Cricket World Cup. In 2017, she came out of retirement to play for Scorchers in the Toyota Super 3s.
