= Charlotte Smith (cricketer) =

Danish cricketer (born 1966)

Personal information
- Born: 1966 (age 59–60); Denmark

International information
- National side: Denmark
- ODI debut (cap 11): 19 July 1989 v Ireland
- Last ODI: 20 July 1991 v England

Career statistics
Competition	WODI
Matches	10
Runs scored	115
Batting average	12.77
100s/50s	0/0
Top score	33*
Balls bowled	182
Wickets	7
Bowling average	23.42
5 wickets in innings	0
10 wickets in match	0
Best bowling	2/5
Catches/stumpings	3/–
- Source: ESPNcricinfo, 26 September 2020

Charlotte Smith (born 1966) is a Danish former cricketer. She played ten Women's One Day International matches for the Denmark women's national cricket team between 1989 and 1991.
