= Trine Christiansen =

Danish cricketer

Personal information
- Full name: Trine Christiansen
- Batting: Right-handed
- Bowling: Right-arm medium-fast
- Role: All-rounder
- Relatives: Dorte Christiansen (sister)

International information
- National side: Denmark
- ODI debut (cap 1): 19 July 1989 v Ireland
- Last ODI: 20 December 1997 v West Indies

Career statistics
Competition	WODI
Matches	26
Runs scored	253
Batting average	10.54
100s/50s	0/0
Top score	30
Balls bowled	552
Wickets	6
Bowling average	61.66
5 wickets in innings	0
10 wickets in match	0
Best bowling	3/17
Catches/stumpings	6/–
- Source: Cricinfo, 25 September 2020

Trine Christiansen is a Danish former international cricketer who represented the Danish national team between 1989 and 1997.

An allrounder, Christiansen batted right-handed and was a medium-fast bowler.
