= Caroline Barrs =

English cricketer (born 1964)

Personal information
- Full name: Caroline Jane Barrs
- Born: 8 July 1964 (age 62); Croydon, Surrey, England
- Batting: Left-handed
- Bowling: Slow left-arm orthodox
- Role: All-rounder

International information
- National side: England (1988–1990)
- ODI debut (cap 52): 3 December 1988 v Australia
- Last ODI: 22 July 1990 v Ireland

Domestic team information
- Years: Team
- 1982–1985: Kent
- 1986–2004: Surrey

Career statistics
Competition	WODI	WFC	WLA
Matches	10	4	115
Runs scored	104	54	2,149
Batting average	13.00	13.50	20.27
100s/50s	0/0	0/0	1/6
Top score	36	25*	151
Balls bowled	503	330	5,390
Wickets	17	0	151
Bowling average	9.52	–	17.41
5 wickets in innings	0	0	4
10 wickets in match	–	0	–
Best bowling	4/23	–	7/11
Catches/stumpings	2/–	0/–	22/–
- Source: CricketArchive, 13 March 2021

Caroline Jane Barrs (born 8 July 1964) is an English former cricketer who played as an all-rounder. She was a left-handed batter and slow left-arm orthodox bowler. She appeared in 10 One Day Internationals for England, making her debut against Australia in the 1988 Women's Cricket World Cup. Overall, she took 17 wickets at an average of 9.52, with a best of four for 23. With the bat, she scored 104 runs with a high score of 36. She played domestic cricket for Kent and Surrey. She has played club cricket for Orpington Nomads and Brighton and Hove.
