= Karen Brown (cricketer) =

Australian cricketer (born 1963)

Personal information
- Full name: Karen Maree Brown
- Born: 9 September 1963 (age 63); Upfield, Victoria, Australia
- Batting: Right-handed
- Bowling: Right-arm medium
- Role: All-rounder

International information
- National side: Australia (1985–1993)
- Test debut (cap 111): 1 August 1987 v England
- Last Test: 19 February 1992 v England
- ODI debut (cap 44): 7 February 1985 v New Zealand
- Last ODI: 29 July 1993 v New Zealand

Domestic team information
- Years: Team
- 1982/83–1993/94: Victoria

Career statistics
Competition	WTest	WODI	WFC	WLA
Matches	9	43	39	83
Runs scored	132	230	432	518
Batting average	22.00	12.77	13.93	16.18
100s/50s	0/1	0/0	0/2	0/0
Top score	65	38	75*	43*
Balls bowled	1,590	2,484	5,175	4,534
Wickets	22	52	87	103
Bowling average	15.72	16.71	13.50	15.28
5 wickets in innings	1	0	1	0
10 wickets in match	0	0	0	0
Best bowling	5/32	4/4	5/32	4/4
Catches/stumpings	10/–	15/–	18/–	25/–
- Source: CricketArchive, 7 January 2023

Karen Maree Brown (born 9 September 1963) is an Australian former cricketer who played as a right-arm medium bowler and right-handed batter. She appeared in 9 Test matches and 43 One Day Internationals for Australia between 1985 and 1993. She captained Australia in one ODI in 1991. She played domestic cricket for Victoria.
