= List of Denmark women ODI cricketers =

A One Day International (ODI) is an international cricket match between two teams, each having ODI status, as determined by the International Cricket Council. The women's variant of the game is similar to the men's version, with minor modifications to umpiring and pitch requirements. The first women's ODI was played in 1973, between England and Australia. The Denmark women's national cricket team played their first ODI during the 1989 Women's European Cricket Cup, when they faced Ireland in the opening round of the tournament in Nykøbing Mors. They competed in two Women's Cricket World Cup; in 1993 and 1997, but lost their status as an ODI-playing nation after the 1999 Women's European Cricket Championship.

In total, Denmark have played 33 ODIs. Janni Jønsson and Susanne Nielsen are the most capped players, each appearing in all but one of Denmark's matches. Jønsson is also the team's leading run-scorer with 388 runs, and wicket-taker with 35 wickets. Her total of 53 against Ireland in 1995 is the highest score in women ODI cricket by a Danish player.

== Key ==
General

- ‡ – Captain
- † – Wicket-keeper
- First – Year of debut
- Last – Year of latest game
- Mat – Number of matches played

Batting

- Runs – Runs scored in career
- HS – Highest score
- Avg – Runs scored per dismissal
- * – Batsman remained not out

Bowling

- Wkt – Wickets taken in career
- BBI – Best bowling in an innings
- Ave – Average runs per wicket

Fielding

- Ca – Catches taken
- St – Stumpings affected

== List of players ==
Statistics are correct as on 21 July 1999, the date of Denmark's last women's ODI (Denmark Women are not currently active in Women's One Day International cricket). This list includes all players who have played at least one ODI match and is initially arranged in the order of debut appearance. Where more than one player won their first cap in the same match, those players are initially listed alphabetically.

Denmark women ODI cricketers
General					Batting			Bowling			Fielding	
No.	Name	First	Last	Mat	Runs	HS	Avg	Wkt	BBI	Ave	Ca	St
1	Trine Christiansen	1989	1997	26	253	30	10.54	6	3/17	61.66	6	0
2	Anne-Mette Fernandes	1989	1989	2	2	2	2.00	–	–	–	0	0
3	Lene Hansen	1989	1991	10	99	45*	12.37	12	4/27	23.25	4	0
4	Janni Jønsson † ‡	1989	1999	32	388	53	12.93	35	4/38	24.77	8	0
5	Susanne Jørgensen †	1989	1989	2	8	4	4.00	–	–	–	1	0
6	Betina Langerhuus	1989	1990	6	75	42	15.00	1	1/17	163.00	1	0
7	Lilli Laursen	1989	1989	3	41	24	13.66	–	–	–	0	0
8	Susanne Nielsen	1989	1999	32	167	35*	7.95	32	4/9	27.56	6	0
9	Vibeke Nielsen	1989	1999	26	275	33	11.00	–	–	–	5	0
10	Marlene Slebsager ‡	1989	1999	21	114	13*	11.40	12	3/25	42.66	3	0
11	Charlotte Smith	1989	1991	10	115	33*	12.77	7	2/5	23.42	3	0
12	Charlotte Corneliussen †	1989	1989	2	15	10	7.50	–	–	–	2	2
13	Mette Frost † ‡	1990	1999	23	295	50	14.04	2	2/37	45.00	14	4
14	Heidi Jensen	1990	1991	5	13	6	3.25	3	2/13	16.66	0	0
15	Jane Jensen †	1990	1993	10	103	49	11.44	–	–	–	2	0
16	Linda Sørensen	1990	1990	1	0	0	0.00	–	–	–	0	0
17	Mette Gregersen	1990	1999	18	60	22	3.52	14	4/6	19.07	4	0
18	Heidi Kjær	1990	1997	16	34	12	3.40	3	2/24	142.00	2	0
19	Dorte Christiansen ‡	1991	1997	21	175	35	8.75	11	3/22	42.63	3	0
20	Pernille Jønsson	1993	1993	4	3	2	3.00	–	–	–	0	0
21	Karin Mikkelsen	1993	1999	20	297	42*	17.47	1	1/53	83.00	4	0
22	Pia Thomsen	1993	1993	5	16	12*	5.33	–	–	–	2	0
23	Malene Iversen †	1993	1999	17	112	22*	8.00	–	–	–	5	9
24	Dorte Christensen †	1995	1999	11	53	26	66.20	–	–	–	0	0
25	Henriette Hansen	1995	1998	6	14	8	2.80	–	–	–	2	0
26	Jette Philipsen	1995	1997	9	53	16	5.88	–	–	–	1	0
27	Hanne Sørensen	1995	1995	1	0	0	0.00	–	–	–	0	0
28	Malene Brock	1997	1998	8	27	8*	6.75	4	2/38	65.25	1	0
29	Inger Nielsen	1997	1999	9	21	7*	21.00	4	2/16	42.50	0	0
30	Heidi Pico	1998	1998	1	1	1	1.00	–	–	–	0	0
31	Eva Christensen	1998	1999	3	13	6*	13.00	2	2/34	17.00	1	0
32	Lene Vilsgaard	1999	1999	3	3	3*	–	3	2/30	28.66	1	0
