= Lene Hansen (cricketer) =

Danish cricketer (born 1964)

Personal information
- Full name: Lene Hansen
- Born: 1964 (age 61–62); Denmark

International information
- National side: Denmark
- ODI debut (cap 3): 19 July 1989 v Ireland
- Last ODI: 20 July 1991 v England

Career statistics
| Competition | WODI |
|---|---|
| Matches | 10 |
| Runs scored | 99 |
| Batting average | 12.37 |
| 100s/50s | 0/0 |
| Top score | 45* |
| Balls bowled | 394 |
| Wickets | 12 |
| Bowling average | 23.25 |
| 5 wickets in innings | 0 |
| 10 wickets in match | 0 |
| Best bowling | 4/27 |
| Catches/stumpings | 4/– |
- Source: Cricinfo, 25 September 2020

Lene Hansen (born 1964) is a Danish former cricketer. She played ten Women's One Day International matches for the Denmark women's national cricket team between 1989 and 1991.
