= Betina Langerhuus =

Danish cricketer (born 1968)

Personal information
- Born: 1968 (age 57–58); Denmark

International information
- National side: Denmark
- ODI debut (cap 6): 19 July 1989 v Ireland
- Last ODI: 20 July 1990 v Netherlands

Career statistics
Competition	WODI
Matches	6
Runs scored	75
Batting average	15.00
100s/50s	0/0
Top score	42
Balls bowled	378
Wickets	1
Bowling average	163.00
5 wickets in innings	0
10 wickets in match	0
Best bowling	1/17
Catches/stumpings	1/–
- Source: Cricinfo, 26 September 2020

Betina Langerhuus (born 1968) is a Danish former cricketer. She played six Women's One Day International matches for the Denmark women's national cricket team between 1989 and 1990.
