= Anita van Lier =

Dutch cricketer (born 1952)

Personal information
- Born: 19 April 1952 (age 74); Netherlands
- Role: All-rounder

International information
- National side: Netherlands (1978–1993)
- ODI debut (cap 9): 8 August 1984 v New Zealand
- Last ODI: 29 July 1993 v England
- Source: CricketArchive, 14 April 2016

Anita van Lier (married name Beecheno-van Lier; born 19 April 1952) is a Dutch former international cricketer who represented the Dutch national team between 1978 and 1993, including as captain for a number of years.

Van Lier made her debut for the Netherlands in 1978, on a tour of England. Her first international appearances came at the 1983 Centenary Tournament in Utrecht (featuring Denmark and Ireland), by which time she had been appointed captain. In August 1984, van Lier was named captain of the Dutch team for their maiden One Day International (ODI) match, a one-off fixture against New Zealand to commemorate the 50th anniversary of the national federation. She opened the batting with Irene Schoof, scoring 45 runs out of a team total of 117 as the Netherlands lost by 67 runs. At the 1986 Women's Quadrangular in Belfast, which included Denmark, England A, Ireland, and the Netherlands, van Lier was the overall leading run-scorer. She finished with 174 runs from three innings, including 56 against Ireland and 100 not out against Denmark.

Captaining the Netherlands at the 1988 World Cup in Australia, van Lier made 159 runs from eight innings, with a highest score of 46 against Ireland. She was the only Dutchwoman to score more than 100 runs during the tournament. She also bowled the third-highest number of overs for her team, taking three wickets. Van Lier relinquished the captaincy after the World Cup, and did not return to the national line-up until the 1993 World Cup in England, by which time she was 39. However, she had lost none of her form from the previous tournament, finishing as her team's leading wicket-taker and third highest run scorer. Against the West Indies, she took 4/24 from 8.4 overs, helping the Dutch team to its only victory of the tournament.
