= Karen van Rijn =

Dutch cricketer

Cricket information
- Role: Wicket-keeper

International information
- National side: Netherlands (1989–1991)
- ODI debut (cap 24): 19 July 1989 v England
- Last ODI: 19 July 1991 v Ireland

Career statistics
Competition	WODI
Matches	9
Runs scored	70
Batting average	10.00
100s/50s	0/0
Top score	20*
Catches/stumpings	4/0
- Source: ESPNcricinfo, 26 December 2017

Karen van Rijn is a Dutch former cricketer who played as a wicket-keeper. She appeared for Netherlands in nine One Day Internationals between 1989 and 1991. She scored 70 runs with a high score of 20 not out and took four catches.
