= Cathy Cooke =

English cricketer

Personal information
- Full name: Catherine Cooke
- Role: Bowler

International information
- National side: England (1989–1990)
- ODI debut: 19 July 1989 v Netherlands
- Last ODI: 17 August 1990 v Ireland

Domestic team information
- Years: Team
- 1988–1991: Yorkshire

Career statistics
Competition	WODI	WLA
Matches	6	25
Runs scored	10	98
Batting average	10.00	10.88
100s/50s	0/0	0/0
Top score	10*	25
Balls bowled	138	943
Wickets	2	17
Bowling average	33.50	28.11
5 wickets in innings	0	0
10 wickets in match	–	–
Best bowling	1/15	2/10
Catches/stumpings	3/–	5/–
- Source: CricketArchive, 12 March 2021

Catherine Cooke is an English former cricketer who played as a bowler. She appeared in six One Day Internationals for England between 1989 and 1990, making her debut against The Netherlands. Overall, she took two wickets, scored 10 runs and took three catches. She played domestic cricket for Yorkshire.
