= Dorine Loman =

Dutch cricketer

Personal information
- Full name: Dorine Liliane Loman
- Born: 30 September 1960 (age 66); Amsterdam, Netherlands
- Batting: Right-handed
- Bowling: Right-arm medium
- Relatives: Madeleine Loman (sister); Annemijn Thomson (first cousin once removed)

International information
- National side: Netherlands (1984–1991)
- ODI debut (cap 4): 8 August 1984 v New Zealand
- Last ODI: 19 July 1991 v Ireland

Career statistics
Competition	WODI
Matches	11
Runs scored	31
Batting average	5.16
100s/50s	0/0
Top score	10
Balls bowled	522
Wickets	8
Bowling average	37.75
5 wickets in innings	0
10 wickets in match	0
Best bowling	2/20
Catches/stumpings	2/–
- Source: CricketArchive, 29 August 2015

Dorine Liliane Loman (born 30 September 1960) is a former Dutch cricketer whose international career for the Dutch national side spanned from 1984 to 1991. A right-arm medium-pace bowler, she played eleven One Day International (ODI) matches, including games at the 1988 World Cup.

Born in Amsterdam, Loman made her debut for the Netherlands in its first ODI, a one-off game against New Zealand for the 50th anniversary of the Nederlandse Dames Cricket Bond. She was not given an opportunity to bowl on debut, but scored five not out as the number-eleven batsman. The Netherlands played no further ODIs until the 1988 World Cup, but did play frequently against other European sides. Loman's matches during that period including an unofficial Test against Ireland, played over three days in July 1987 at the Sportpark Klein Zwitserland in The Hague.

At the World Cup in Australia, played in November and December 1988, Loman played in five out of the team's eight matches, taking four wickets. She led her team's bowling averages, and with Ingrid Dulfer-Keijzer was the equal leading wicket taker for the Netherlands. Against Ireland she took what were to be career-best figures, 2/20 from nine overs. Loman's next ODIs came at the 1990 European Championship, against Ireland and Denmark, where she went wicketless. Her last ODIs were played at the age of 30, at the 1991 European Championship, where she took 2/36 against Denmark, 1/47 against England, and 1/8 against Ireland. Loman finished her career with eight wickets from eleven matches, at an average of 37.75. Her younger sister, Leine Loman, also played in two ODIs for the Netherlands, but the sisters never played together at that level.
