= Lisa Nye =

English cricketer (born 1966)

Personal information
- Full name: Lisa Nye
- Born: 24 October 1966 (age 60); Tunbridge Wells, Kent, England
- Role: Wicket-keeper

International information
- National side: England (1988–1992)
- Test debut (cap 110): 11 January 1992 v New Zealand
- Last Test: 19 February 1992 v Australia
- ODI debut (cap 51): 30 November 1988 v New Zealand
- Last ODI: 25 January 1992 v Australia

Domestic team information
- Years: Team
- 1988–1997: Middlesex

Career statistics
Competition	WTest	WODI	WFC	WLA
Matches	4	21	6	65
Runs scored	33	31	51	1,061
Batting average	16.50	31.00	12.75	26.52
100s/50s	0/0	0/0	0/0	1/7
Top score	16	13*	16	105
Catches/stumpings	10/3	10/9	11/3	49/25
- Source: CricketArchive, 20 February 2021

Lisa Nye (born 24 October 1966) is an English cricketer and former member of the England women's cricket team who played as a wicket-keeper. She played 4 Test matches and 21 One Day Internationals. She played domestic cricket for Middlesex.
