= Sonia Reamsbottom =

Irish cricketer (born 1962)

Personal information
- Full name: Sonia Elizabeth Reamsbottom
- Born: 28 March 1962 (age 64); Kildare, Ireland
- Batting: Right-handed
- Role: Wicket-keeper

International information
- National side: Ireland
- Source: Cricinfo, 7 April 2014

Sonia Elizabeth Reamsbottom (born 28 March 1962 in Kildare) is an Irish cricketer. She was a right-handed wicket-keeper batsman.
