= Donna Armstrong =

Irish cricketer

Personal information
- Full name: Donna Karen Armstrong
- Born: Belfast, Northern Ireland
- Batting: Right-handed
- Bowling: Right-arm slow
- Relatives: Lloyd Armstrong (father)

International information
- National side: Ireland (1983–1991)
- ODI debut (cap 1): 28 June 1987 v Australia
- Last ODI: 19 July 1991 v Netherlands
- Source: CricketArchive, 1 September 2016

Donna Karen Armstrong is a former Irish international cricketer who represented the Irish national team between 1983 and 1991. She played as a right-handed middle-order batsman.

Armstrong was born in Belfast, Northern Ireland, and attended Down High School in Downpatrick. Her father, Lloyd Armstrong, played first-class cricket for Ireland in the 1940s and 1950s. Armstrong made her international debut at the 1983 Centenary Tournament in the Netherlands, playing against the Netherlands and Denmark. Her One Day International (ODI) debut came against Australia in June 1987, in Ireland's first ODI series. The following year, Armstrong was selected for the 1988 World Cup in Australia. She appeared in six of Ireland's nine matches, but scored just 33 runs (with a highest score of 21 not out against the Netherlands). Armstrong finished her international career after the 1991 European Championship in the Netherlands. She played 20 ODIs in total, scoring 118 runs with a batting average of just 6.94. Her highest score was 24, made against England at the 1990 European Cup. At the time of her last ODI, Armstrong was 42 years and 154 days old, making her one of the oldest to have played at that level (and the oldest for Ireland).
