= Wendy Watson (cricketer) =

English cricketer (born 1960)

Personal information
- Full name: Wendy Ann Watson
- Born: 8 July 1960 (age 66); Belper, Derbyshire, England
- Batting: Left-handed
- Bowling: Left-arm medium
- Role: Batter

International information
- National side: England (1987–1993)
- Test debut (cap 105): 1 August 1987 v Australia
- Last Test: 19 February 1992 v Australia
- ODI debut (cap 46): 16 July 1987 v Australia
- Last ODI: 1 August 1993 v New Zealand

Domestic team information
- Years: Team
- 1981–1996: East Midlands
- 1997–2002: Derbyshire
- 2003–2004: Nottinghamshire

Career statistics
Competition	WTest	WODI	WFC	WLA
Matches	7	23	23	124
Runs scored	289	768	937	4,098
Batting average	28.90	48.00	32.31	43.59
100s/50s	0/3	1/5	1/7	4/29
Top score	70	107*	153*	147*
Balls bowled	78	0	676	991
Wickets	1	–	5	34
Bowling average	42.00	–	53.60	17.97
5 wickets in innings	0	–	0	0
10 wickets in match	0	–	0	0
Best bowling	1/26	–	1/6	4/32
Catches/stumpings	1/0	3/0	5/–	38/–
- Source: CricketArchive, 20 February 2021

Wendy Ann Watson (born 8 July 1960) is an English former cricketer who played as a left-handed batter and left-arm medium bowler. She appeared in 7 Test matches and 23 One Day Internationals for England between 1987 and 1993. Her final WODI appearance was in the final of the 1993 Women's Cricket World Cup. She played domestic cricket for East Midlands, Derbyshire and Nottinghamshire.
