= Stella Owens =

Irish cricketer (born 1966)

Personal information
- Full name: Stella Anne Owens
- Born: 26 May 1966 (age 60); Dublin, Ireland
- Batting: Right-handed
- Bowling: Right-arm fast

International information
- National side: Ireland
- Source: Cricinfo, 26 October 2016

Stella Owens (born 26 May 1966) is an Irish former cricketer. She played twenty-four Women's One Day International matches for Ireland women's cricket team. She was part of Ireland's squad for the 1988 Women's Cricket World Cup.
