= Jo Chamberlain =

English cricketer (born 1969)

Jo Jordan
Personal information
- Full name: Joanna Michelle Jordan
- Born: 25 April 1969 (age 57); Leicester, Leicestershire, England
- Batting: Left-handed
- Bowling: Left-arm medium
- Role: All-rounder

International information
- National side: England (1987–1995)
- Test debut (cap 103): 1 August 1987 v Australia
- Last Test: 10 December 1995 v India
- ODI debut (cap 44): 16 July 1987 v Australia
- Last ODI: 15 December 1995 v India

Domestic team information
- Years: Team
- 1985–1995: East Midlands

Career statistics
Competition	WTest	WODI	WFC	WLA
Matches	9	39	11	97
Runs scored	197	422	320	1,556
Batting average	17.90	20.09	24.61	31.12
100s/50s	0/1	0/0	0/2	1/6
Top score	59	47*	61	105
Balls bowled	1,840	1,928	2,322	5,046
Wickets	28	49	45	139
Bowling average	24.75	16.42	18.62	15.12
5 wickets in innings	2	2	4	4
10 wickets in match	0	0	1	0
Best bowling	5/26	7/8	6/22	7/8
Catches/stumpings	0/–	17/–	0/–	43/–
- Source: CricketArchive, 21 February 2021

Joanna Michelle Jordan (née Chamberlain; born 25 April 1969) is a cricketer who played for the England women's cricket team in 9 Test matches and 39 One Day Internationals from 1987 to 1995. She played domestic cricket for East Midlands.

She scored a total of 197 runs in Tests matches, averaging 17.90 with a best of 59 against Australia. She took 28 wickets at an average of 24.75 with a best analysis of 5 for 26 against New Zealand.

She made 422 runs in One Day International cricket at an average of 20.09, with the highlight an unbeaten 47 against New Zealand. She took 49 wickets at an average of 16.42 with an economy rate of 2.50 per over. Her best spell was a devastating 7 for 8 against Denmark. She helped England win the World Cup in 1993, scoring 38 and taking a wicket in the victory over New Zealand in the final at Lord's.

Her son, Scott, died of cot death in February 2000, which lead to her becoming a fundraiser for The Cot Death Society.
