= Elizabeth Owens (cricketer) =

Irish cricketer (born 1963)

Personal information
- Full name: Elizabeth Owens
- Born: 2 January 1963 (age 63); Dublin, Ireland
- Batting: Right-handed
- Bowling: Right-arm medium-fast
- Role: All-rounder
- Relatives: Stella Owens (sister)

International information
- National side: Ireland
- Source: Cricinfo, 7 April 2014

Elizabeth Owens (born 2 January 1963 in Dublin) is an Irish cricketer. She was a right-handed batsman as well as right-arm medium-fast. She is sister of Stella Owens.
