= International Women's Cricket Council =

Former international governing body of women's cricket

- Merged into: International Cricket Council
- Formation: 1958
- Dissolved: 2005

The International Women's Cricket Council IWCC was the global governing body of Women's cricket. formed in February 1958 by the women's cricket associations of Australia, England, the Netherlands, New Zealand and South Africa.

In 2005 it was merged with the International Cricket Council (ICC) to form one unified body to help manage and develop cricket.

== List of members ==
The IWCC had a maximum of 13 members at one time, and 17 members in total in the course of its history. Founding members are marked with a dagger (†).

Full members

- Australia (from 1958) †
- Barbados (1973–1978)
- Denmark (from 1985)
- England (from 1958) †
- India (from 1973)
- Ireland (from 1985)
- Jamaica (1969–1978)
- Netherlands (from 1958) †
- New Zealand (from 1958) †
- Pakistan (from 1997)
- South Africa (from 1958) †
- Sri Lanka (from 1997)
- Trinidad and Tobago (1973–1978)
- West Indies (from 1978)

Affiliate members

- Canada (from 1995)
- Japan (from 1995)

Observers

- Pakistan (1993 only)
- West Indies (1976–1978)
