= Anne Murray (cricketer) =

Irish cricketer (born 1961)

Personal information
- Full name: Anne Bernadette Murray
- Born: 4 May 1961 (age 65); Dublin, Ireland
- Batting: Right-handed

International information
- National side: Ireland (1983–1990)
- ODI debut (cap 7): 28 June 1987 v Australia
- Last ODI: 17 August 1990 v England
- Source: Cricinfo, 26 October 2016

Anne Murray (born 4 May 1961) is an Irish former cricketer. She played twenty-one Women's One Day International matches for Ireland women's cricket team. She was part of Ireland's squad for the 1988 Women's Cricket World Cup.
