= Debra Maybury =

English cricketer (born 1971)

Personal information
- Full name: Debra Maybury
- Born: 8 August 1971 (age 55); Huddersfield, Yorkshire, England
- Batting: Right-handed
- Bowling: Right-arm medium
- Role: All-rounder

International information
- National side: England (1988–1995)
- Test debut (cap 109): 11 January 1992 v New Zealand
- Last Test: 24 November 1995 v India
- ODI debut (cap 50): 30 November 1988 v New Zealand
- Last ODI: 22 July 1995 v Ireland

Domestic team information
- Years: Team
- 1998–1995: Yorkshire

Career statistics
Competition	WTest	WODI	WFC	WLA
Matches	5	27	8	79
Runs scored	52	275	121	1,582
Batting average	7.42	17.18	9.30	31.64
100s/50s	0/0	0/1	0/0	3/9
Top score	17	56	40	109
Balls bowled	484	408	862	2,565
Wickets	5	13	8	58
Bowling average	32.40	12.46	41.87	20.17
5 wickets in innings	0	0	0	0
10 wickets in match	0	0	0	0
Best bowling	3/37	2/7	3/37	4/12
Catches/stumpings	4/–	5/–	7/–	13/–
- Source: CricketArchive, 20 February 2021

Debra Maybury (born 8 August 1971) is an English cricketer and former member of the England women's cricket team who played as a right-handed batter and right-arm medium bowler. She played 5 Test matches and 27 One Day Internationals between 1988 and 1995. She played domestic cricket for Yorkshire.
