= Susan Bray =

Irish cricketer (born 1967)

Personal information
- Full name: Susan Bray
- Born: 27 August 1967 (age 59); Dublin, Ireland
- Batting: Right-handed
- Bowling: Right-arm medium-fast

International information
- National side: Ireland (1983–1996)
- ODI debut (cap 2): 28 June 1987 v Australia
- Last ODI: 18 July 1996 v New Zealand
- Source: Cricinfo, 25 September 2020

Susan Bray (born 27 August 1967) is an Irish former cricketer. She played 34 Women's One Day International matches for Ireland women's cricket team. She was part of Ireland's squad for the 1988 Women's Cricket World Cup.
