= Irene Schoof =

Dutch cricketer (born 1963)

Personal information
- Born: 1963 (age 62–63)

International information
- National side: Netherlands (1984–1991)
- ODI debut (cap 7): 8 August 1984 v New Zealand
- Last ODI: 19 July 1991 v Ireland
- Source: ESPNcricinfo, 25 October 2016

Irene Schoof (born 1963) is a Dutch former cricketer. In her career from 1984 to 1999, she played fifteen Women's One Day International matches for the Netherlands women's national cricket team. She was part of the Netherlands squad for the 1988 Women's Cricket World Cup.
