= Mary-Pat Moore =

Irish cricketer (born 1961)

Personal information
- Full name: Mary-Pat Moore
- Born: 24 April 1961 (age 65); Dublin, Ireland
- Batting: Right-handed
- Bowling: Right-arm medium
- Role: All-rounder

International information
- National side: Ireland (1987–1996)
- ODI debut (cap 6): 28 June 1987 v Australia
- Last ODI: 19 July 1996 v New Zealand

Domestic team information
- Years: Team
- 1987–1996: Yorkshire

Career statistics
Competition	WODI	WFC	WLA
Matches	37	1	84
Runs scored	854	30	1,755
Batting average	25.11	15.00	29.25
100s/50s	1/3	0/0	2/8
Top score	114*	30	114*
Balls bowled	760	18	1,980
Wickets	13	0	53
Bowling average	31.53	–	19.71
5 wickets in innings	0	0	0
10 wickets in match	0	0	0
Best bowling	3/16	–	4/1
Catches/stumpings	5/–	0/–	17/–
- Source: CricketArchive, 21 April 2022

Mary-Pat Moore (born 24 April 1961) is an Irish former cricketer who played as a right-handed batter and right-arm medium bowler. She appeared in 37 One Day Internationals for Ireland between 1987 and 1996. She played domestic cricket for Yorkshire.

Moore captained Ireland between 1983 and 1993, including at the 1988 and 1993 World Cups. Her highest ODI score came in 1995, when she scored 114* against Denmark at the 1995 Women's European Cricket Cup.
