= 1993 Women's Cricket World Cup =

1993 Women's World Cup
- Dates: 20 July – 1 August 1993
- Administrator: International Women's Cricket Council
- Cricket format: Women's One Day International (60-over)
- Tournament format(s): Round-robin; Playoffs
- Host: England
- Champions: England (2nd title)
- Runners-up: New Zealand
- Participants: 8
- Matches: 29
- Most runs: (England) Jan Brittin (416)
- Most wickets: (England) Karen Smithies (New Zealand) Julie Harris (15)

The 1993 Women's Cricket World Cup was an international cricket tournament played in England from 20 July to 1 August 1993. Hosted by England for the second time, it was the fifth edition of the Women's Cricket World Cup, and came over four years after the preceding 1988 World Cup in Australia.

The tournament was organised by the International Women's Cricket Council (IWCC), with matches played over 60 overs. It was a tournament "run on a shoestring", and was close to being cancelled until a £90,000 donation was received from the Foundation for Sport and the Arts. England won the tournament for a second time, defeating New Zealand in the final by 67 runs. A record eight teams participated, with Denmark, India, and the West Indies joining the five teams from the 1988 edition. Denmark and the West Indies were making their tournament debuts. (Note: Jamaica and Trinidad and Tobago had fielded separate teams at the inaugural 1973 World Cup, but a combined West Indian team had not previously participated. India had been invited to the 1988 World Cup, but had to withdraw after failing to secure sponsorship money.) England's Jan Brittin was the tournament's highest run-scorer, while her captain Karen Smithies and New Zealand's Julie Harris led the tournament in wickets.

== Squads ==
Australia Coach: Peter Bakker	Denmark Coach: Erik Juul Lassen	England Coach: Ruth Prideaux	India Coach: Rajesh Nayyar
Lyn Larsen (c); Denise Annetts; Sharyn Bow; Joanne Broadbent; Karen Brown; Bronwyn Calver; Julie Calvert; Belinda Clark; Cathryn Fitzpatrick; Zoe Goss; Sally Griffiths; Belinda Haggett; Lee-Anne Hunter; Christina Matthews	Janni Jønsson (c); Dorte Christiansen; Trine Christiansen; Mette Frost; Mette Gregersen; Malene Iversen; Jane Jensen; Pernille Jønsson; Heidi Kjaer; Karin Mikkelsen; Susanne Nielsen; Vibeke Nielsen; Marlene Slebsager; Pia Thomsen	Karen Smithies (c); Jan Brittin; Jo Chamberlain; Barbara Daniels; Janet Godman; Carole Hodges; Suzie Kitson; Debra Maybury; Helen Plimmer; Jane Smit; Gillian Smith; Debra Stock; Clare Taylor; Wendy Watson	Diana Edulji (c); Sandhya Agarwal; Pramila Bhatt; Sandra Braganza; Sangita Dabir; Laya Francis; Shashi Gupta; Anju Jain; Venkatacher Kalpana; Chanderkanta Kaul; Mamatha Maben; Purnima Rau; Rajani Venugopal
Ireland; Coach: Brendan O'Brien	Netherlands	New Zealand; Coach: Ann McKenna	West Indies; Coach: Theo Cuffy
Mary-Pat Moore (c); Susan Bray; Marguerite Burke; Sandra Dawson; Miriam Grealey; Judith Herbison; Barbara McDonald; Catherine O'Neill; Elizabeth Owens; Stella Owens; Sonia Reamsbottom; Nikki Squire; Janice Walsh; Saibh Young	Nicola Payne (c); Caroline de Fouw; Ingrid Dulfer-Keijzer; Wendy Gerritsen; Jiska Howard; Edmee Janss; Inge Kure; Geeske Ludwig; Saskia Melchers; Pauline te Beest; Anita van Lier; Jet van Noortwijk; Esther Veltman; Angela Venturini	Sarah Illingworth (c); Trudy Anderson; Lisa Astle; Kirsty Bond; Catherine Campbell; Emily Drumm; Karen Gunn; Julie Harris; Debbie Hockley; Penny Kinsella; Maia Lewis; Sarah McLauchlan; Karen Musson; Jennifer Turner	Ann Browne (c); Eve Caesar; Dianne Cagen; Elaine Cunningham; Patricia Felicien; Eugena Gregg; Carol-Ann James; Desiree Luke; Marlene Needham; Stephanie Power; Jacqueline Robinson; Rita Scott; Cherry-Ann Singh; Jennifer Sterling

== Venues ==
Twenty-five venues hosted matches at the 1993 Women's World Cup (except where noted, each venue hosted only one match): 1. Walton Lea Road, Warrington, Cheshire; 2. Recreation Ground, Banstead, Surrey; 3. John Player Ground, Nottingham, Nottinghamshire; 4. Denis Compton Oval, Shenley, Hertfordshire; 5. Harewood Road, Collingham, Yorkshire; 6. Christ Church Ground, Oxford, Oxfordshire; 7. Woodbridge Road, Guildford, Surrey; 8. Willow Lane, Meir Heath, Staffordshire; 9. Pixham Lane, Dorking, Surrey; 10. Arundel Castle Cricket Ground, Arundel, Sussex; 11. Buckinghamshire grounds –; 1. Chalvey Road, Slough, Buckinghamshire; 2. Pound Lane, Marlow, Buckinghamshire; 3. Wilton Park, Beaconsfield, Buckinghamshire; 12. Nevill Ground, Royal Tunbridge Wells, Kent; 13. Lindfield Common, Lindfield, Sussex; 14. Berkshire grounds –; 1. Wellington College, Crowthorne, Berkshire – three matches; 2. Memorial Ground, Finchampstead, Berkshire; 15. Sonning Lane, Reading, Berkshire; 16. Greater London grounds –; 1. Bank of England Ground, Roehampton; 2. Civil Service Sports Ground, Chiswick; 3. Corfton Road, Ealing – two matches; 4. Honor Oak Cricket Club, Dulwich; 5. Lloyds Bank Sports Ground, Beckenham – two matches; 6. Lord's, City of Westminster; 7. Midland Bank Sports Ground, Beckenham, Greater London

== Warm-up matches ==
Eleven warm-up matches were played against various English teams, all before the beginning of the tournament.

Warm-up matches

11 July
Scorecard

England B 214/7 (60 overs)	v	England; 217/5 (53.3 overs)

England won by 5 wickets
Bray Ground, Bray, Berkshire

- England B won the toss and elected to bat.

14 July
Scorecard

New Zealand; 292/2 (60 overs)	v	England B 56 (35.5 overs)

New Zealand won by 236 runs
Peaches Close, Cheam, Greater London

- New Zealand won the toss and elected to bat.

16 July
Scorecard

New Zealand; 212/8 (60 overs)	v	(England) Surrey; 92 (59 overs)

New Zealand won by 120 runs
Peaches Close, Cheam, Greater London

- New Zealand won the toss and elected to bat.

17 July
Scorecard

India; 234/1 (54 overs)	v	East of England; 100/5 (54 overs)

India won by 134 runs
Haileybury College, Hertford, Hertfordshire

- East of England won the toss and elected to bowl.

17 July
Scorecard

Ireland; 206/3 (60 overs)	v	(England) Mid-South; 166/8 (60 overs)

Ireland won by 40 runs
Eton College, Eton, Berkshire

- Mid-South won the toss and elected to bowl.

17 July
Scorecard

West Indies; 206/5 (60 overs)	v	(England) Mid-West; 121/6 (60 overs)

West Indies won by 85 runs
Deepweir, Caldicot, Monmouthshire

- West Indies won the toss and elected to bat.

17 July
Scorecard

Australia; 286/3 (60 overs)	v	North of England; 142/6 (60 overs)

Australia won by 144 runs
Harewood Road, Collingham, Yorkshire

17 July
Scorecard

New Zealand; 224/5 (60 overs)	v	South-East England; 31 (33.2 overs)

New Zealand won by 193 runs
Bank of England Ground, Roehampton, Greater London

- South-East England won the toss and elected to bowl.

18 July
Scorecard

England; 287/6 (60 overs)	v	England B 142/8 (60 overs)

England won by 145 runs
Crabble Athletic Ground, Dover, Kent

- England B won the toss and elected to bowl.

18 July
Scorecard

Netherlands; 211/3 (60 overs)	v	Junior England; 100/7 (60 overs)

Netherlands won by 111 runs
Little Heath, Christleton, Cheshire

- Netherlands won the toss and elected to bat.

18 July
Scorecard

Denmark; 212/5 (60 overs)	v	(England) WCA President's XI; 179/8 (60 overs)

Denmark won by 33 runs
Charterhouse School, Godalming, Surrey

- WCA President's XI won the toss and elected to bowl.

== Group stage ==
=== Points table ===
Team	Pld	W	L	T	NR	Pts	RR
New Zealand	7	7	0	0	0	28	3.202
England	7	6	1	0	0	24	3.382
Australia	7	5	2	0	0	20	3.147
India	7	4	3	0	0	16	2.544
Ireland	7	2	5	0	0	8	2.607
West Indies	7	2	5	0	0	8	2.270
Denmark	7	1	6	0	0	4	1.926
Netherlands	7	1	6	0	0	4	1.791
Source: CricketArchive

- Note: run rate was used as a tiebreaker in the case of teams finishing on an equal number of points, rather than net run rate (as is now common).

=== Matches ===
==== 1st Match ====
20 July
Scorecard

Netherlands; 53 (49.3 overs)	v	Australia; 56/0 (16.5 overs)
Ariette van Noortwijk 15; Bronwyn Calver 4/8 (12 overs)		Belinda Clark 37*

Australia won by 10 wickets
Walton Lea Road, Warrington, Cheshire
Umpires: Alan Fox (Aus) and Valerie Gibbens (Aus)

- Netherlands won the toss and elected to bat.
- Inge Kure and Sashia Melchers (Ned) made their WODI debut.

==== 2nd Match ====
20 July
Scorecard

England; 286/3 (60 overs)	v	Denmark; 47 (33.5 overs)
Janette Brittin 104; Dorte Christiansen 1/48 (7 overs)		Trine Christiansen 23; Carole Hodges 4/3 (4.5 overs)

England won by 239 runs
Recreation Ground, Banstead, Surrey

- Denmark won the toss and elected to bowl.
- Barbara Daniels, Jane Smit (Eng), Pernille Jønsson, Karin Mikkelsen and Pia Thomsen (Den) made their WODI debut.

==== 3rd Match ====
20 July
Scorecard

India; 155/5 (52.3 overs)	v	West Indies; 92 (48.4 overs)
Anju Jain 84*; Cherry-Ann Singh 1/14 (5 overs)		Carol-Ann James 20; Diana Edulji 3/15 (9 overs)

India won by 63 runs
John Player Ground, Nottingham, Nottinghamshire

- India won the toss and elected to bat.
- The match was reduced to 52.3 overs per side when rain interrupted play during India's innings.
- Pramila Bhatt, Laya Francis, Anju Jain, Chanderkanta Kaul, Mamatha Maben, Purnima Rau (Ind), Ann Browne, Eva Caesar, Dianne Cagen, Eugena Gregg, Carol-Ann James, Desiree Luke, Marlene Needham, Jacqueline Robinson, Rita Scott, Cherry-Ann Singh and Jennifer Sterling (WIN) all made their WODI debut.

==== 4th Match ====
20 July
Scorecard

Ireland; 82/6 (39 overs)	v	New Zealand; 83/3 (19.3 overs)
Sonia Reamsbottom 35; Emily Drumm 2/10 (5 overs)		Maia Lewis 32*; Judith Herbison 1/26 (5 overs)

New Zealand won by 7 wickets
Denis Compton Oval, Shenley, Hertfordshire

- Ireland won the toss and elected to bat.
- The match was reduced to 39 overs per side before the start of play.
- Catherine O'Neill and Sandra Dawson (Ire) both made their WODI debut.

==== 5th Match ====
21 July
Scorecard

India; 108 (58.4 overs)	v	Australia; 114/3 (38.3 overs)
Shashi Gupta 32*; Karen Brown 3/19 (12 overs)		Denise Annetts 40*; Pramila Bhatt 1/27 (9 overs)

Australia won by 7 wickets
Harewood Road, Collingham, Yorkshire

- India won the toss and elected to bat.
- Sangita Dabir (Ind) made her WODI debut.

==== 6th Match ====
21 July
Scorecard

Ireland; 234/6 (60 overs)	v	Denmark; 164/9 (60 overs)
Miriam Grealey 63*; Janni Jonsson 3/34 (12 overs)		Mette Frost 37; Susan Bray 3/22 (12 overs)

Ireland won by 70 runs
Christ Church Ground, Oxford, Oxfordshire
Player of the match: Miriam Grealey (Ire)

- Denmark won the toss and elected to bowl.

==== 7th Match ====
21 July
Scorecard

New Zealand; 127 (54.5 overs)	v	England; 102 (57.2 overs)
Emily Drumm 24; Gill Smith 3/16 (11.5 overs)		Karen Smithies 22; Sarah McLauchlan 2/23 (12 overs)

New Zealand won by 25 runs
Lloyds Bank Sports Ground, Beckenham, Greater London

- England won the toss and elected to bowl.

==== 8th Match ====
21 July
Scorecard

Netherlands; 158 (59.5 overs)	v	West Indies; 88 (45.4 overs)
Pauline te Beest 62; Carol-Ann James 3/17 (8 overs)		Ann Browne 17; Anita van Lier 4/24 (8.4 overs)

Netherlands won by 70 runs
Willow Lane, Meir Heath, Staffordshire

- Netherlands won the toss and elected to bat.
- Wendy Gerritsen (Ned) made her WODI debut.

==== 9th Match ====
24 July
Scorecard

West Indies; 131/8 (60 overs)	v	Australia; 133/2 (29.5 overs)
Ann Browne 65*; Bronwyn Calver 4/4 (12 overs)		Belinda Clark 53; Carol-Ann James 1/25 (6 overs)

Australia won by 8 wickets
Nevill Ground, Royal Tunbridge Wells, Kent

- West Indies won the toss and elected to bat.
- Cathryn Fitzpatrick, Julie Calvert (Aus), Elaine Cunningham, Patricia Felician and Stephanie Power (WIN) made their WODI debut.

==== 10th Match ====
24 July
Scorecard

Denmark; 93 (58.1 overs)	v	New Zealand; 94/1 (17.5 overs)
Karin Mikkelsen 29; Julie Harris 3/13 (12 overs)		Debbie Hockley 44; Janni Jonsson 1/14 (4 overs)

New Zealand won by 9 wickets
Wellington College, Crowthorne, Berkshire

- Denmark won the toss and elected to bat.
- Malene Iversen (Den) and Lisa Astle (NZ) made their WODI debut.

24 July
Scorecard

England; 259/4 (60 overs)	v	Ireland; 80/9 (56 overs)

England won on faster scoring rate
Sonning Lane, Reading, Berkshire

- Ireland won the toss and elected to bowl.
- Ireland's target was 242 runs in 56 overs.

24 July
Scorecard

India; 93/4 (35 overs)	v	Netherlands; 76 (34.1 overs)

India won by 17 runs
Wilton Park, Beaconsfield, Buckinghamshire

- Netherlands won the toss and elected to bowl.
- The match was restricted to 35 overs per side before the start of play.

25 July
Scorecard

Australia; 194/8 (60 overs)	v	Ireland; 145/5 (60 overs)

Australia won by 49 runs
Bank of England Ground, Roehampton, Greater London

- Australia won the toss and elected to bat.

25 July
Scorecard

West Indies; 120 (45.3 overs)	v	Denmark; 76 (51.2 overs)

West Indies won by 44 runs
Lloyds Bank Sports Ground, Beckenham, Greater London

- Denmark won the toss and elected to bowl.

25 July
Scorecard

England; 179 (50.5 overs)	v	India; 176 (59.5 overs)

England won by 3 runs
Memorial Ground, Finchampstead, Berkshire

- India won the toss and elected to bowl.

25 July
Scorecard

Netherlands; 40 (54.2 overs)	v	New Zealand; 41/0 (13.2 overs)

New Zealand won by 10 wickets
Lindfield Common, Lindfield, Sussex

- Netherlands won the toss and elected to bat.

26 July
Scorecard

Denmark; 152/7 (60 overs)	v	Netherlands; 122 (55.1 overs)

Denmark won by 30 runs
Wellington College, Crowthorne, Berkshire

- Denmark won the toss and elected to bat.

26 July
Scorecard

England; 208/5 (60 overs)	v	Australia; 165 (53.5 overs)

England won by 43 runs
Woodbridge Road, Guildford, Surrey

- England won the toss and elected to bat.

26 July
Scorecard

Ireland; 151 (58.4 overs)	v	India; 152/6 (57.3 overs)

India won by 4 wickets
Wellington College, Crowthorne, Berkshire

- India won the toss and elected to bowl.

==== 20th Match ====
26 July
Scorecard

West Indies; 96 (57.1 overs)	v	New Zealand; 97/3 (26.4 overs)

New Zealand won by 7 wickets
Civil Service Sports Ground, Chiswick, Greater London

- West Indies won the toss and elected to bat.

28 July
Scorecard

Denmark; 76 (54 overs)	v	Australia; 77/3 (8.5 overs)

Australia won by 7 wickets
Honor Oak Cricket Club, Dulwich, Greater London

- Denmark won the toss and elected to bat.

28 July
Scorecard

West Indies; 120 (59.4 overs)	v	England; 123/6 (46.1 overs)

England won by 4 wickets
Arundel Castle Cricket Ground, Arundel, Sussex

- England won the toss and elected to bowl.

28 July
Scorecard

New Zealand; 154/8 (60 overs)	v	India; 112 (54.3 overs)

New Zealand won by 42 runs
Corfton Road, Ealing, Greater London

- New Zealand won the toss and elected to bat.

28 July
Scorecard

Netherlands; 134/8 (60 overs)	v	Ireland; 136/8 (56.3 overs)

Ireland won by 2 wickets
Pound Lane, Marlow, Buckinghamshire

- Netherlands won the toss and elected to bat.

29 July
Scorecard

Australia; 77 (51.3 overs)	v	New Zealand; 78/0 (18.2 overs)

New Zealand won by 10 wickets
Midland Bank Sports Ground, Beckenham, Greater London

- Australia won the toss and elected to bat.

29 July
Scorecard

Denmark; 116 (57.5 overs)	v	India; 117/1 (40.5 overs)

India won by 9 wickets
Chalvey Road, Slough, Buckinghamshire

- Denmark won the toss and elected to bat.

29 July
Scorecard

England; 207/5 (60 overs)	v	Netherlands; 74 (53.5 overs)

England won by 133 runs
Corfton Road, Ealing, Greater London

- Netherlands won the toss and elected to bowl.

29 July
Scorecard

West Indies; 208/6 (60 overs)	v	Ireland; 189/8 (60 overs)

West Indies won by 19 runs
Pixham Lane, Dorking, Surrey

- Ireland won the toss and elected to bowl.

== Final ==
The final at Lord's was attended by 4,500 spectators, including the prime minister of the United Kingdom, John Major. The match was broadcast live on BBC's Grandstand, and England's victory received front-page and back-page coverage in all of the major national newspapers, a first for women's cricket. England's performance was often contrasted with that of the English men's team, which had lost the 1993 Ashes series to Australia less than a week earlier. The Women's Cricket Association (WCA) was praised for its management of the final, but the increased media coverage also led to some criticism of its role in the sport as a whole.

1 August
Scorecard

England; 195/5 (60 overs)	v	New Zealand; 128 (55.1 overs)
Jan Brittin 48 (117); Sarah McLauchlan 2/25 (10 overs)		Maia Lewis 28 (87); Gillian Smith 3/29 (12 overs)

England won by 67 runs
Lord's Cricket Ground, London
Player of the match: Jo Chamberlain (Eng)

- England won the toss and elected to bat.

== Statistics ==
=== Most runs ===
The top five runscorers are included in this table, ranked by runs scored, then by batting average, then alphabetically by surname.

Player	Team	Runs	Inns	Avg	Highest	100s	50s
Jan Brittin	England	410	8	51.25	104	2	1
Carole Hodges	England	334	8	47.71	113	2	0
Helen Plimmer	England	242	7	34.57	118	1	1
Sandhya Agarwal	India	229	7	45.80	58*	0	2
Debbie Hockley	New Zealand	229	8	45.80	53*	0	1

Source: CricketArchive

=== Most wickets ===
The top five wicket takers are listed in this table, ranked by wickets taken and then by bowling average.

Player	Team	Overs	Wkts	Ave	SR	Econ	BBI
Karen Smithies	England	77.0	15	7.93	30.80	1.54	3/6
Julie Harris	New Zealand	77.3	15	9.33	31.00	1.80	3/5
Gillian Smith	England	58.2	14	9.50	25.00	2.28	5/30
Diana Edulji	India	75.3	14	10.35	32.35	1.92	4/12
Clare Taylor	England	87.5	14	11.42	37.64	1.82	4/13

Source: CricketArchive
