= Women's Cricket World Cup records =

Records from the Women's Cricket World Cup

The first ever Cricket World Cup was organised for women in 1973 by the English Women's Cricket Association, based on an idea by cricketer Rachel Heyhoe Flint and businessman Jack Hayward. After the success of the Women's Cricket World Cup, the men's tournament took place two years later.

Seven teams competed in the inaugural tournament in England which took place over five and a half weeks. Each ODI match was 60 overs and every team played each other in a round-robin league format. Subsequent tournaments were hampered by lack of funds for women's teams meaning that their scheduling for many years was inconsistent. The 1997 World Cup was the first to be played with 50 overs and a knock-out stage.

Since the inaugural tournament, there have been a total of 13 World Cups. Australia have won the most World Cups, having won 7 out of the 12 tournaments. Several important records have been set at the Women's World cup, including the first 400+ score in ODI cricket and the first ODI double century, both of which predate the records in men's ODIs.

== Notation ==
Team notation

- (300–3) indicates that a team scored 300 runs for three wickets and the innings was closed, either due to a successful run chase or if no overs remained (or are able) to be bowled.
- (300) indicates that a team scored 300 runs and was all out, either by losing all ten wickets or by having one or more batters unable to bat and losing the remaining wickets.

Batting notation

- (100) indicates that a batter scored 100 runs and was out.
- (100*) indicates that a batter scored 100 runs and was not out.

Bowling notation

- (5–100) indicates that a bowler has captured five wickets while giving away 100 runs.

== Team records ==
Women's Cricket World Cup Winners and Runner-ups
Rank	Country	Wins	Runners-up	Total Appearances
1	Australia	7	2	13
2	England	4	4	13
3	New Zealand	1	3	13
4	India	1	2	11
5	South Africa	0	1	8
6	West Indies	0	1	7
Updated as of the end of the 2025 Women's Cricket World Cup.

=== Team wins, losses, ties, and no results ===
Team	First Appearance	Last Appearance	Matches	Won	Lost	Tied	No result	% Win
Australia	1973	2025	100	85	12	1	2	86.73%
Bangladesh	2022	2025	14	2	11	0	1	15.38%
Denmark	1993	1997	13	2	11	0	0	15.38%
England	1973	2025	100	67	29	2	2	68.36%
India	1978	2025	79	42	34	1	2	54.54%
International XI	1973	1982	18	3	14	0	1	16.66%
Ireland	1988	2005	34	7	26	0	1	20.58%
Jamaica	1973		5	1	4	0	0	20.00%
Netherlands	1988	2000	26	2	24	0	0	7.69%
New Zealand	1973	2025	94	55	34	2	3	60.43%
Pakistan	1997	2025	37	3	31	0	3	8.82%
South Africa	1997	2025	55	26	27	0	2	49.05%
Sri Lanka	1997	2025	41	9	29	0	3	23.68%
Trinidad & Tobago	1973		6	2	4	0	0	33.33%
West Indies	1993	2022	46	16	28	0	2	34.78%
Young England	1973		6	1	5	0	0	16.66%
Last updated: 2 November 2025. The win percentage excludes no results; a tie counts as half a win. Doesn't include forfeited matches.

=== Result records ===
==== Greatest win margin (by runs) ====
Margin	Teams	Venue	Date	Ref.
363 runs	Australia (412–3) beat Denmark (49)	Middle Income Group Club Ground, Bandra, Mumbai	16 December 1997	
255 runs	Australia (284–1) beat Netherlands (29)	Willetton Sports Club, Perth	29 November 1988	
239 runs	England (286–3) beat Denmark (47)	Recreation Ground, Banstead, Surrey	20 July 1993	
230 runs	England (376–2) beat Pakistan (146–3)	Indira Gandhi Stadium, Vijayawada	12 December 1997	
223 runs	New Zealand (373–7) beat Pakistan (150)	Drummoyne Oval, Sydney	19 March 2009	
Last updated: 31 July 2023.

==== Lowest win margin (by runs) ====
As well as these narrow victories, there have been three matches where the scores finished level, two in the 1982 World Cup and one in the 1997 World Cup.

Margin	Teams	Venue	Date	Ref.
1 run	South Africa (196) beat West Indies (168)	Laudium Oval, Pretoria	24 March 2005	
2 runs	Australia (147) beat England (145)	Brabourne Stadium, Mumbai	8 February 2013	
3 runs	England (179) beat India (176)	Finchampstead Park, Berkshire	25 July 1993	
3 runs	England (259–8) beat Australia (256–8)	County Ground, Bristol	9 July 2017	
3 runs	West Indies (259–9) beat New Zealand (256)	Bay Oval, Tauranga	4 March 2022	
Last updated: 31 July 2023.

=== Team scoring records ===
==== Highest innings totals ====
Score	Team	Opponent	Venue	Date	Ref.
412–3 (50 overs)	Australia	Denmark	Middle Income Group Club Ground, Bandra, Mumbai	16 December 1997	
377–7 (50 overs)	England	Pakistan	Grace Road, Leicester	27 June 2017	
376–2 (50 overs)	England	Pakistan	Indira Gandhi Stadium, Vijayawada	12 December 1997	
373–7 (50 overs)	New Zealand	Pakistan	Drummoyne Oval, Sydney	19 March 2009	
373–5 (50 overs)	England	South Africa	County Ground, Bristol	5 July 2017	
Last updated: 31 July 2023.

==== Lowest innings totals ====
Score	Team	Opponent	Venue	Date	Refs.
27 (13.4 overs)	Pakistan	Australia	Lal Bahadur Shastri Stadium, Hyderabad	14 December 1997	
29 (25.1 overs)	Netherlands	Australia	Willetton Sports Club, Perth	29 November 1988	
37 (25 overs)	India	New Zealand	Cornwall Park, Auckland	14 January 1982	
40 (54.2 overs)	Netherlands	New Zealand	Lindfield Cricket Club Ground, Sussex	25 July 1993	
47 (33.5 overs)	Denmark	England	Recreation Ground, Banstead, Surrey	July 20, 1993	
Last updated: 31 July 2023.

==== Highest match aggregate ====
Score	Teams	Venue	Date	Ref.
679–15 (98.2 overs)	Australia (338) v India (341–5)	DY Patil Stadium, Navi Mumbai	30 October 2025	
678–14 (100 overs)	England (373–5) v South Africa (305–9)	County Ground, Bristol	5 July 2017	
661–17 (97.5 overs)	India (330) v Australia (331–7)	ACA-VDCA Stadium, Visakhapatnam	12 October 2025	
641–15 (93.4 overs)	Australia (356–5) v England (285)	Hagley Oval, Christchurch	3 April 2022	
611–11 (93 overs)	India (340–3 (49 overs)) v New Zealand (271–8 (44 overs))	DY Patil Stadium, Navi Mumbai	23 October 2025	
Last updated: 30 October 2025

==== Lowest match aggregate ====
Score	Teams	Venue	Date	Ref.
55–11 (19.5 overs)	Australia (28–1) v Pakistan (27)	Lal Bahadur Shastri Stadium, Hyderabad	14 December 1997	
81–10 (67.4 overs)	Netherlands (40) v New Zealand (41–0)	Lindfield Cricket Club Ground, Sussex	25 July 1993	
97–10 (28.1 overs)	Netherlands (48–8) v New Zealand (49–2)	Mohan Meakins Cricket Stadium, Ghaziabad	11 December 1997	
99–12 (61.0 overs)	New Zealand (50–2) v India (49)	Ilam University, Christchurch	2 February 1982	
99–10 (31.4 overs)	South Africa (51–0) v West Indies (48)	Grace Road, Leicester	2 June 2017	
Last updated: 31 July 2023.

==== Highest run chase ====
Score	Team	Opposition	Venue	Date	Ref.
341–5 (48.2 overs)	India	Australia	DY Patil Stadium, Navi Mumbai	30 October 2025	
331–7 (49 overs)	Australia	India	ACA-VDCA Stadium, Visakhapatnam	12 October 2025	
280–4 (49.3 overs)	Australia	India	Eden Park, Auckland	19 March 2022	
275–7 (50 overs)	South Africa	India	Hagley Oval, Christchurch	27 March 2022	
272–5 (45.2 overs)	Australia	South Africa	Basin Reserve, Wellington	22 March 2022	
Last updated: 30 October 2025

=== Most extras ===
An extra is a run scored by a means other than a batter hitting the ball. Other than runs scored off the bat from a no-ball, a batter is not given credit for extras and the extras are tallied separately on the scorecard and count only towards the team's score.

Extras	Team credited	Team conceded	b	lb	w	nb	Venue	Date	Ref.
51	South Africa	Pakistan	1	4	46	0	IPCL Sports Complex Ground, Vadodara	16 December 1997	
46	New Zealand	West Indies	4	10	32	0	Sector 16 Stadium, Chandigarh	15 December 1997	
45	Ireland	Netherlands	0	3	41	1	Hagley Oval, Christchurch	14 December 2000	
43	Australia	South Africa	0	7	33	3	LC de Villiers Oval, Pretoria	28 March 2005	
39	Sri Lanka	England	0	1	38	0	Harlequins, Pretoria	24 March 2005	
39	Ireland	South Africa	2	3	33	1	Nehru Stadium, Pune	14 December 1997	
Last updated: 6 August 2023.

=== Tournament Leaders ===
100% win record
Team	Year	Matches played
Australia	1982	13 (Note: One match tied.)
Australia	2022	9
Australia	1997	7
Australia	2005	7 (Note: Includes one match which had No Result.)
Australia	1978	3
Updated 30 October 2025.

=== Streaks ===
==== Consecutive matches undefeated ====
Matches	Team	Years	Ref.
21	Australia	1978–1988	
15	Australia	1997–2000	
15	Australia	2022–2025	
11	New Zealand	1988–1993	
10	England	1993–1997	
Updated 30 October 2025.

==== Consecutive defeats ====
Losses	Team	Years	Ref.
18	Pakistan	2009–2022	
12	International XI	1982	
9	Netherlands	1988–1993	
8	Netherlands	1997–2000	
7	Netherlands	1993–1997	
Updated 30 October 2025.

== Batting ==
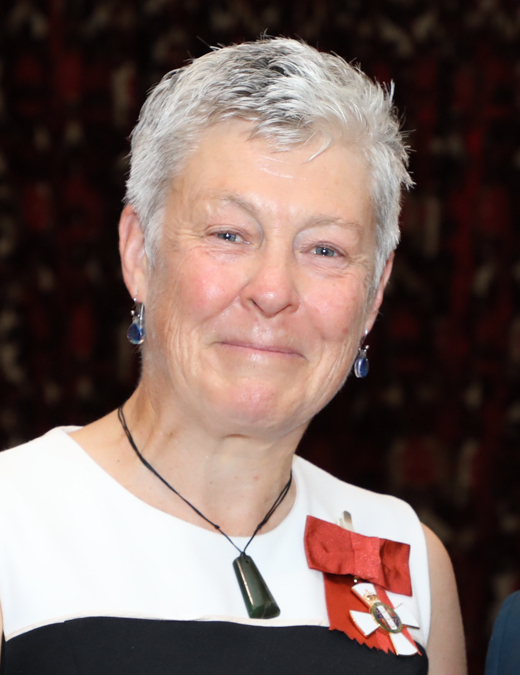
Debbie Hockley, the World Cup's leading batter

=== Runs ===
==== Most career runs ====
Runs	Batter	Mat	Inn	NO	HS	Avg	100s	50s	Period
1,501	(New Zealand) Debbie Hockley	45	43	8	100*	42.88	2	10	1982–2000
1,328	(South Africa) Laura Wolvaardt	24	24	3	169	63.23	2	12	2017–2025
1,321	(India) Mithali Raj	38	36	8	109	47.17	2	11	2000–2022
1,299	(England) Jan Brittin	36	35	5	138*	43.40	4	3	1982–1997
1,231	(England) Charlotte Edwards	30	28	5	173*	53.52	4	7	1997–2013
Last updated: 2 November 2025.

==== Highest individual scores ====
Runs	Batter	Balls	4s	6s	SR	Opposition	Venue	Date	Ref.
229* (Note: This was the first double century (men's or women's) in ODI cricket.)	(Australia) Belinda Clark	155	22	-	147.74	Denmark	Middle Income Group Club Ground, Bandra, Mumbai	16 December 1997	
178*	(Sri Lanka) Chamari Athapaththu	143	22	6	124.47	Australia	County Ground, Bristol	29 June 2017	
173*	(England) Charlotte Edwards	155	19	-	111.61	Ireland	Nehru Stadium, Pune	16 December 1997	
171*	(India) Harmanpreet Kaur	115	20	7	148.69	Australia	County Ground, Derby	20 July 2017	
171	(Cricket West Indies) Stafanie Taylor	138	26	-	123.18	Sri Lanka	Middle Income Group Club Ground, Bandra, Mumbai	3 February 2013	
Last updated: 30 October 2025.

==== Most centuries ====
Centuries	Batter	Mat	Inn	Runs	HS	Span
5	(England) Nat Sciver-Brunt	26	23	1,067	148*	2017-2025
4	(Australia) Alyssa Healy	22	19	906	170	2017–2025
4	(England) Charlotte Edwards	30	28	1231	173*	1997–2013
4	(New Zealand) Suzie Bates	34	31	1,219	168	2009–2025
4	(England) Jan Brittin	36	35	1,299	138*	1982–1997
Last updated: 30 October 2025.

==== Most 50+ scores ====
No.	Batter	Mat	Inn	Runs	HS	100s	50s	Span
14	(South Africa) Laura Wolvaardt	24	23	1,328	169	2	12	2017–2025
13	(India) Mithali Raj	38	36	1,321	109	2	11	2000–2022
12	(New Zealand) Debbie Hockley	45	43	1,501	100*	2	10	1982–2000
11	(England) Charlotte Edwards	30	28	1,231	173*	4	7	1997–2013
9	(Australia) Karen Rolton	28	22	974	154*	3	6	1997–2009
9	(India) Harmanpreet Kaur	35	30	1,136	171*	3	6	2009–2025
9	(New Zealand) Suzie Bates	34	31	1,219	168	4	5	2009–2025
Last updated: 2 November 2025.

==== Fastest 50 ====
Balls	Batter	Opposition	Venue	Date	Ref.
20	(Cricket West Indies) Deandra Dottin	Sri Lanka	Middle Income Group Club Ground, Bandra, Mumbai	3 February 2013	
25	(South Africa) Chloe Tryon	England	County Ground, Bristol	5 July 2017	
26	(Sri Lanka) Nilakshi de Silva	New Zealand	R. Premadasa Stadium, Colombo	14 October 2025	
27	(New Zealand) Sophie Devine	Pakistan	County Ground, Taunton	8 July 2017	
29	(New Zealand) Rachel Priest	West Indies	County Ground, Taunton	6 July 2017	
Last updated: 14 October 2025

==== Most ducks ====
Ducks	Batter	Matches	Innings	Span
6	(Denmark) Susanne Nielsen	13	11	1993–1997
5	(Netherlands) Irene Schoof	8	8	1988
5	(India) Lopamudra Bhattacharji	15	12	1978–1982
5	(Sri Lanka) Udeshika Prabodhani	14	12	2009–2025
5	(Denmark) Dorte Christiansen	13	13	1993–1997
5	(Cricket West Indies) Kycia Knight	17	16	2013–2022
5	(Sri Lanka) Chamani Seneviratne	17	17	1997–2013
Last updated: 27 October 2025

=== Averages ===
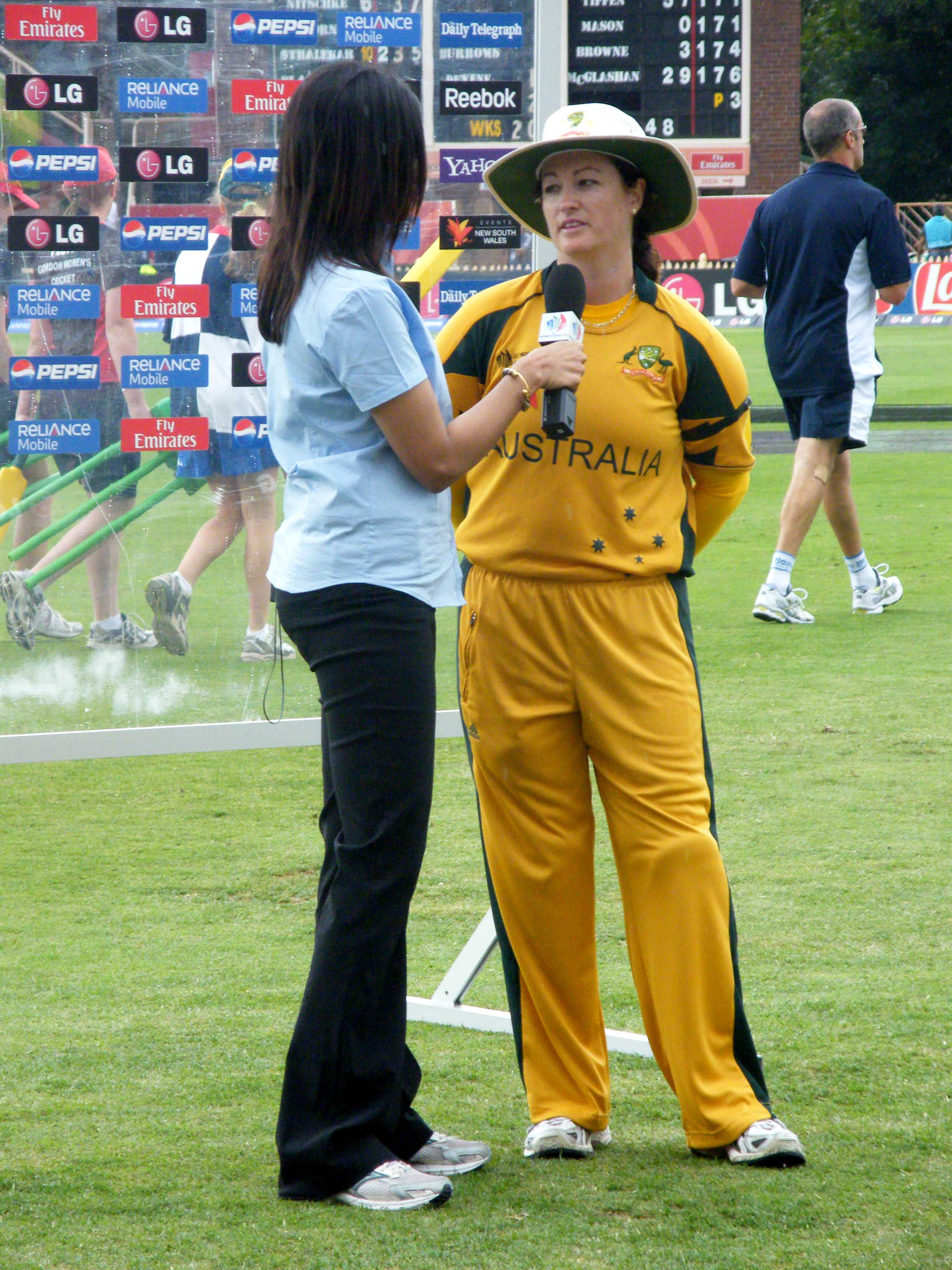
Karen Rolton, the batter with the highest batting average in the World Cup, photographed at the 2009 World Cup.

==== Highest average ====
Average	Batter	Mat	Inn	NO	Runs	Span
74.92	(Australia) Karen Rolton	28	22	9	974	1997–2009
63.23	(South Africa) Laura Wolvaardt	24	24	3	1,328	2017–2025
61.14	(England) Claire Taylor	19	18	4	856	2000–2009
60.57	(Australia) Belinda Clark	29	26	7	1,151	1993–2005
60.44	(England) Rachael Heyhoe Flint	18	16	7	544	1973–1982
Qualification: Minimum 10 innings. Last updated: 2 November 2025.

==== Highest strike rate ====
Strike rate	Batter	Mat	Inn	Runs	BF	Span
113.81	(Australia) Alyssa Healy	22	19	906	781	2017–2025
95.35	(England) Nat Sciver-Brunt	26	23	1,067	1,119	2017–2025
94.22	(Cricket West Indies) Deandra Dottin	29	28	718	762	2009–2022
93.11	(India) Harmanpreet Kaur	35	30	1,136	1,220	2009–2025
91.85	(New Zealand) Sophie Devine	32	27	958	1,043	2009–2025
Qualification: Minimum 500 balls faced. Last updated: 2 November 2025

=== Boundaries ===
==== Sixes ====
Sixes	Batter	Mat	Inn	Span
23	(New Zealand) Sophie Devine	32	27	2009–2025
22	(Cricket West Indies) Deandra Dottin	29	28	2009–2022
22	(India) Harmanpreet Kaur	35	30	2009–2025
17	(India) Smriti Mandhana	25	25	2017–2025
13	(South Africa) Chloe Tryon	27	22	2013–2025
Last updated: 2 November 2025.

==== Fours ====
Fours	Batter	Mat	Inn	Span
158	(South Africa) Laura Wolvaardt	24	24	2017–2025
158	(England) Charlotte Edwards	30	28	1997–2013
150	(New Zealand) Suzie Bates	34	31	2009–2025
132	(Australia) Alyssa Healy	22	19	2017–2025
131	(India) Mithali Raj	38	36	2000–2022
Last updated: 2 November 2025.

==== Most sixes in an innings ====
Sixes	Batter	Opposition	Runs	Balls	Venue	Date	Ref
9	(New Zealand) Sophie Devine	Pakistan	93	41	County Ground, Taunton	8 July 2017	
7	(South Africa) Lizelle Lee	India	92	65	Grace Road, Leicester	8 July 2017	
7	(India) Harmanpreet Kaur	Australia	171	115	County Ground, Derby	20 July 2017	
6	(New Zealand) Suzie Bates	Pakistan	168	105	Drummoyne Oval, Sydney	19 March 2009	
6	(New Zealand) Sophie Devine	South Africa	145	131	DRIEMS Ground, Cuttack	1 January 2013	
6	(Sri Lanka) Chamari Athapaththu	Australia	178	143	County Ground, Bristol	29 June 2017	
Last updated: 3 August 2023.

==== Most fours in an innings ====
Fours	Batter	Opposition	Runs	Balls	Venue	Date	Ref
26	(Australia) Alyssa Healy	England	170	138	Hagley Oval, Christchurch	3 April 2022	
24	(England) Sarah Taylor	South Africa	147	104	County Ground, Bristol	5 July 2017	
22	(Australia) Belinda Clark	Denmark	229*	155	Middle Income Group Club Ground, Bandra, Mumbai	16 December 1997	
22	(Sri Lanka) Chamari Athapaththu	Australia	178*	143	County Ground, Bristol	29 June 2017	
22	(England) Tammy Beaumont	South Africa	148	145	County Ground, Bristol	5 July 2017	
Last updated: 3 August 2023.

==== Boundary runs in an innings ====
Boundary Runs	Batter	4s	6s	Opposition	Venue	Date	Ref.
124	(Sri Lanka) Chamari Athapaththu	22	6	Australia	County Ground, Bristol	29 June 2017	
122	(India) Harmanpreet Kaur	20	7	Australia	County Ground, Derby	20 July 2017	
112	(New Zealand) Suzie Bates	19	6	Pakistan	Drummoyne Oval, Sydney	19 March 2009	
104	(Australia) Alyssa Healy	26	0	England	Hagley Oval, Christchurch	3 April 2022	
104	(South Africa) Laura Wolvaardt	20	4	England	Assam Cricket Association Stadium, Guwahati	29 October 2025	
Last updated: 29 October 2025.

=== One tournament ===
Most 50+ scores
50+	HS	Batter	Tournament
5	90*	(New Zealand) Debbie Hockley	1988
5	71	(Australia) Ellyse Perry	2017
5	90	(South Africa) Laura Wolvaardt	2022
5	169	(South Africa) Laura Wolvaardt	2025
Last updated: 2 November 2025.

Most runs
Runs	Mat	Inn	Batter	Tournament
571	9	9	(South Africa) Laura Wolvaardt	2025
509	9	9	(Australia) Alyssa Healy	2022
497	9	9	(Australia) Rachael Haynes	2022
456	7	7	(New Zealand) Debbie Hockley	1997
448	8	8	(Australia) Lindsay Reeler	1988
Last updated 2 November 2025.

Most sixes
Sixes	Mat	Inn	Batter	Tournament
12	7	7	(Cricket West Indies) Deandra Dottin	2013
12	7	7	(South Africa) Lizelle Lee	2017
12	8	8	(India) Richa Ghosh	2025
11	9	8	(India) Harmanpreet Kaur	2017
10	9	7	(South Africa) Nadine de Klerk	2025
Last updated: 2 November 2025

Most fours
Fours	Mat	Inn	Batter	Tournament
73	9	9	(South Africa) Laura Wolvaardt	2025
69	9	9	(Australia) Alyssa Healy	2022
57	9	9	(Australia) Rachael Haynes	2022
55	7	7	(New Zealand) Suzie Bates	2013
54	9	9	(England) Tammy Beaumont	2017
54	9	9	(England) Sarah Taylor	2017
Last updated: 2 November 2025.

== Bowling ==
=== Wickets ===
==== Most career wickets ====
Wickets	Bowler	Mat	Inn	Avg.	Econ	BBI	Span
44	(South Africa) Marizanne Kapp	31	29	22.15	4.46	5–20	2009–2025
43	(India) Jhulan Goswami	34	34	21.74	3.45	4–16	2005–2022
39	(Australia) Lyn Fullston	20	20	11.94	2.22	5–27	1982–1988
39	(Australia) Megan Schutt	29	29	26.56	4.50	3–40	2013–2025
37	(England) Sophie Ecclestone	16	16	6/36	15.02	3.92	2022–2025
37	(England) Carole Hodges	24	24	14.86	2.35	4–3	1982–1993
Last updated: 2 November 2025.

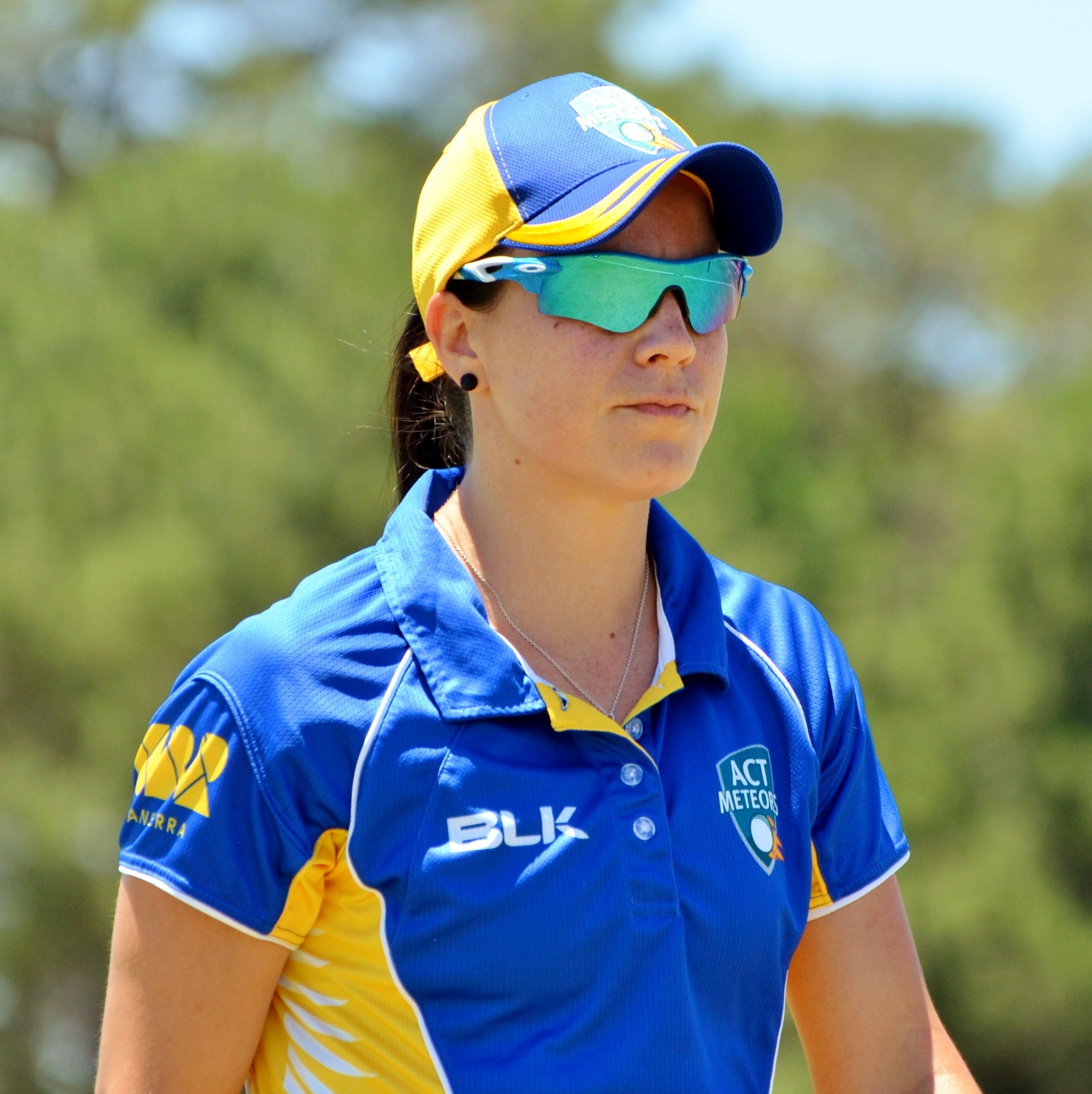
Marizanne Kapp, the leading wicket taker at the World Cup.

==== Best bowling figures ====
Figures	Bowler	Overs	Maidens	Econ	Opposition	Venue	Date	Ref.
7–18	(Australia) Alana King	7.0	2	2.57	South Africa	Holkar Stadium, Indore	25 October 2025	
6–10	(New Zealand) Jackie Lord	8.0	2	1.25	India	Cornwall Park, Auckland	14 January 1982	
6–20	(New Zealand) Glenys Page	6.2	0	3.15	Trinidad and Tobago	Clarence Park, St Albans	3 June 1973	
6–36	(England) Sophie Ecclestone	8.0	0	4.50	South Africa	Hagley Oval, Christchurch	31 March 2022	
6–46	(England) Anya Shrubsole	9.4	0	4.75	India	Lord's, London	23 July 2017	
Last updated: 30 October 2025.

==== Most four-wicket hauls ====
4W+	Bowler	Mat	Inn	Avg.	BBI	5W+	Span
4	(South Africa) Dane van Niekerk	16	14	12.66	4-0	0	2009–2017
4	(Australia) Lyn Fullston	20	20	11.94	5–27	2	1982–1988
3	(England) Sophie Ecclestone	16	16	15.02	6–36	1	2022–2025
3	(England) Anya Shrubsole	23	22	20.35	6–46	2	2009–2022
3	(South Africa) Marizanne Kapp	31	29	22.15	5–20	2	2009–2025
3	(England) Carole Hodges	24	24	14.86	4–3	0	1982–1993
Last updated: 2 November 2025.

==== List of hat-tricks ====
Bowler	Opposition	Dismissals	Venue	Date	Ref.
(England) Carole Hodges	Denmark	Susanne Nielsen; Pia Thomsen; Heidi Kjær	Recreation Ground, Banstead, Surrey	July 20, 1993	
(New Zealand) Julie Harris	West Indies	Eugena Gregg; Cherry-Ann Singh; Patricia Felicien	Civil Service Sports Ground, Chiswick	26 July 1993	
Last updated: 4 August 2023

=== Averages ===
==== Best average ====
Avg.	Bowler	Mat	Inn	Wic	Econ	Overs	Span
9.72	(New Zealand) Katrina Keenan	15	15	25	1.97	123.0	1997–2000
11.50	(Australia) Charmaine Mason	14	14	26	2.53	118.0	1997–2000
11.94	(Australia) Lyn Fullston	20	20	39	2.22	209.1	1982–1988
12.66	(South Africa) Dane van Niekerk	16	14	27	3.88	88.0	2009–2017
12.72	(New Zealand) Jackie Lord	15	13	25	2.40	132.3	1973–1982
Qualification: Minimum 500 deliveries. Last updated: 28 October 2025.

==== Best strike-rate ====
Strike-rate	Bowler	Mat	Inn	Wic	Overs	Span
19.5	(South Africa) Dane van Niekerk	16	14	27	88.0	2009–2017
22.9	(England) Sophie Ecclestone	16	16	37	141.4	2022–2025
25.3	(Australia) Annabel Sutherland	13	11	20	84.2	2022–2025
26.5	(India) Shubhangi Kulkarni	14	14	21	92.5	1978–1982
26.7	(New Zealand) Kathryn Ramel	16	16	19	84.4	1997–2000
Qualification: Minimum 500 deliveries. Last updated: 30 October 2025.

==== Best economy rate ====
Economy rates	Bowler	Mat	Inn	Wic	Runs	Overs	Span
1.53	(New Zealand) Sue Brown	12	12	11	176	114.3	1982
1.57	(New Zealand) Brigit Legg	9	9	11	240	100.2	1988
1.69	(Australia) Karen Brown	14	14	18	240	142.0	1988–1993
1.72	(Australia) Marie Cornish	14	14	15	237	137.2	1978–1982
1.77	(Australia) Denise Martin	9	9	14	180	101.4	1982
Qualification: Minimum 500 deliveries. Last updated: 28 October 2025.

=== One tournament ===
Most wickets in a tournament
Wickets	Bowler	Mat	Inn	Avg	Econ	BBI	Tournament
23	(Australia) Lyn Fullston	12	12	12.00	2.24	5–27	1982
22	(India) Deepti Sharma	9	9	20.40	5.52	5–39	2025
22	(New Zealand) Jackie Lord	12	11	12.40	2.40	6–10	1982
21	(England) Sophie Ecclestone	9	9	15.61	3.83	6–36	2022
20	(India) Neetu David	8	8	8.35	2.54	5–32	2005
20	(India) Shubhangi Kulkarni	12	12	11.70	2.89	3–19	1982
Last updated: 2 November 2025.

== Fielding ==
=== Overall ===
==== Most Catches ====
Catches	Player	Mat	Inn	Max	Dis/Inn	Period
19	(New Zealand) Suzie Bates	34	34	4	0.558	2009–2025
19	(England) Jan Brittin	36	36	2	0.527	1982–1997
18	(India) Jhulan Goswami	34	34	3	0.529	2005–2022
15	(Australia) Beth Mooney	24	22	3	0.681	2017–2025
15	(India) Smriti Mandhana	25	25	3	0.600	2017–2025
Last updated: 2 November 2025.

==== Most catches in an innings ====
Catches	Player	Opposition	Venue	Date	Ref.
4	(New Zealand) Suzie Bates	Australia	Holkar Stadium, Indore	1 October 2025	
Last updated: 30 October 2025.

=== One tournament ===
Most catches in a tournament
Catches	Player	Mat	Inn	Max	Dis/Inn	Tournament
8	(New Zealand) Amy Satterthwaite	6	6	3	1.333	2017
8	(New Zealand) Suzie Bates	7	7	4	1.142	2025
8	(England) Lydia Greenway	7	7	3	1.142	2009
8	(India) Smriti Mandhana	9	9	3	0.888	2025
8	(South Africa) Laura Wolvaardt	9	9	2	0.888	2025
Last updated: 2 November 2025.

== Wicketkeeping ==
=== Overall ===
==== Most dismissals ====
Dismissals	Wicket-keeper	Mat	Inn	Catches	Stumpings	Max dis	Dis/Inn	Period
40	(England) Jane Smit	29	28	22	18	4	1.428	1993–2005
33	(South Africa) Trisha Chetty	25	24	27	6	5	1.375	2009–2022
32	(New Zealand) Rebecca Rolls	22	21	24	8	4	1.523	1997–2005
31	(India) Anju Jain	24	23	14	17	5	1.347	1993–2005
29	(England) Shirley Hodges	22	22	17	12	4	1.318	1973–1982
Last updated: 27 October 2025.

==== Most dismissals in an innings ====
Dismissals	Wicket-keeper	Catches	Stumpings	Opposition	Venue	Date	Ref.
6	(New Zealand) Sarah Illingworth	4	2	Australia	HSBC Sports and Social Club, Beckenham	29 July 1993	
6	(India) Venkatacher Kalpana	1	5	Denmark	Slough Cricket Club, Slough	29 July 1993	
5	(India) Fowzieh Khalili	2	3	England	Cooks Gardens, Whanganui	20 January 1982	
5	(India) Anju Jain	3	2	New Zealand	Technikon Oval, Pretoria	30 March 2005	
5	(South Africa) Trisha Chetty	5	1	Sri Lanka	Barabati Stadium, Cuttack	13 February 2013	
5	(India) Richa Ghosh	4	1	Pakistan	Bay Oval, Mount Maunganui	6 March 2022	
Last updated: 5 August 2023.

=== One tournament ===
Most dismissals in a tournament
Dismissals	Wicket-keeper	Mat	Inn	Catches	Stumpings	Max dis	Dis/Inn	Tournament
20	(India) Fowzieh Khalili	10	10	7	13	5	2.000	1982
19	(England) Shirley Hodges	13	13	10	9	4	1.461	1982
19	(Australia) Terri Russell	13	13	8	11	4	1.461	1982
17	(New Zealand) Sarah Illingworth	8	8	10	7	6	2.125	1993
17	(India) Anju Jain	8	8	9	8	5	2.125	2005
17	(New Zealand) Edna Ryan	12	12	12	5	4	1.416	1982
Last updated: 27 October 2025.

== Partnership ==
=== Highest partnerships (any wicket) ===
Runs	Partnership	Batters	Batting team	Opposition	Venue	Date	Ref.
275	2nd wicket	Sarah Taylor & Tammy Beaumont	England	South Africa	County Ground, Bristol	5 July 2017	
262	2nd wicket	Haidee Tiffen & Suzie Bates	New Zealand	Pakistan	Drummoyne Oval, Sydney	19 March 2009	
246	1st wicket	Lynne Thomas & Enid Bakewell	England	International XI	County Ground, Hove	23 June 1973	
220	1st wicket	Lindsay Reeler & Ruth Buckstein	Australia	Netherlands	Willetton Sports Club, Perth	29 November 1988	
216	1st wicket	Alyssa Healy & Rachael Haynes	Australia	West Indies	Basin Reserve, Wellington	30 March 2022	
An asterisk (*) signifies an unbroken partnership (i.e. neither of the batters was dismissed before either the end of the allotted overs or the required score being reached). Last updated: 5 August 2023.

=== Highest partnerships (by wicket) ===
Partnership	Runs	Batters	Batting Team	Opposition	Venue	Date	Ref.
1st wicket	246	Lynne Thomas & Enid Bakewell	England	International XI	County Ground, Hove	23 June 1973	
2nd wicket	275	Sarah Taylor & Tammy Beaumont	England	South Africa	County Ground, Bristol	5 July 2017	
3rd wicket	213	Helen Plimmer & Carole Hodges	England	Ireland	Sonning Lane, Reading	24 July 1993	
3rd wicket	213	Nat Sciver-Brunt & Heather Knight	England	Pakistan	Grace Road, Leicester	27 June 2017	
4th wicket	184	Smriti Mandhana & Harmanpreet Kaur	India	West Indies	Seddon Park, Hamilton	12 March 2022	
5th wicket	188*	Claire Taylor & Jane Smit	England	Sri Lanka	Bert Sutcliffe Oval, Lincoln	12 December 2000	
6th wicket	139*	Sara McGlashan & Nicola Browne	New Zealand	South Africa	Bradman Oval, Bowral	12 March 2009	
7th wicket	122	Pooja Vastrakar & Sneh Rana	India	Pakistan	Bay Oval, Mount Maunganui	6 March 2022	
8th wicket	88	Richa Ghosh & Sneh Rana	India	South Africa	ACA–VDCA Stadium, Visakhapatnam	9 October 2025	
9th wicket	106	Beth Mooney & Alana King	Australia	Pakistan	R. Premadasa Stadium, Colombo	8 October 2025	
10th wicket	76	Alex Blackwell & Kristen Beams	Australia	India	County Ground, Derby	20 July 2017	
An asterisk (*) signifies an unbroken partnership (i.e. neither of the batter was dismissed before either the end of the allotted overs or the required score being reached). Last updated: 30 October 2025

== Other records ==
=== Grounds ===
The World Cup has been held in India, England and New Zealand three times each. As many of New Zealand's grounds have multiple fields, they dominate the list. However, even when those fields are considered as separate grounds, they still take places 3 in the top 5.

Matches	Ground	City	Country	Period
22	Bert Sutcliffe Oval (Note: Bert Sutcliffe Oval, Lincoln Green and Lincoln No.3 are all parts of New Zealand Cricket's High Performance Centre at Lincoln University. If separated, the Bert Sutcliffe Oval has hosted 13 matched and Lincoln Green had hosted 9.)	Lincoln	New Zealand	2000
14	Hagley Oval (Note: If separated, the Hagley Oval has hosted 7 matches and Hagley Park No.2 has hosted 7.)	Christchurch	New Zealand	2000–2022
13	Basin Reserve	Wellington	New Zealand	1982–2022
13	North Sydney Oval (Note: If separated, the North Sydney Oval has hosted 11 matches and Oval No.2 has hosted 2.)	Sydney	Australia	1988–2009
10	Brabourne Stadium	Mumbai	India	2013
10	R. Premadasa Stadium	Colombo	Sri Lanka	2025
Last updated: 24 October 2025.

=== Umpires ===
==== Most matches ====
Matches	Umpire	Gender	Period
22	Kathy Cross	female	2000–2017
19	Shaun George	male	2005–2017
15	Brian Jerling	male	2000–2009
15	Sue Redfern	female	2017–2025
15	Jacqueline Williams	female	2017–2025
Last updated: 2 November 2025

==== Most matches (female umpire) ====
Matches	Umpire	Period
22	Kathy Cross	2000–2017
15	Sue Redfern	2017–2025
15	Jacqueline Williams	2017–2025
14	Claire Polosak	2017–2025
12	Eloise Sheridan	2022–2025
Last updated: 2 November 2025

Additionally, Shaun George has umpired in three World Cup finals (2005, 2013 and 2017), more than any other umpire.

=== Appearances ===
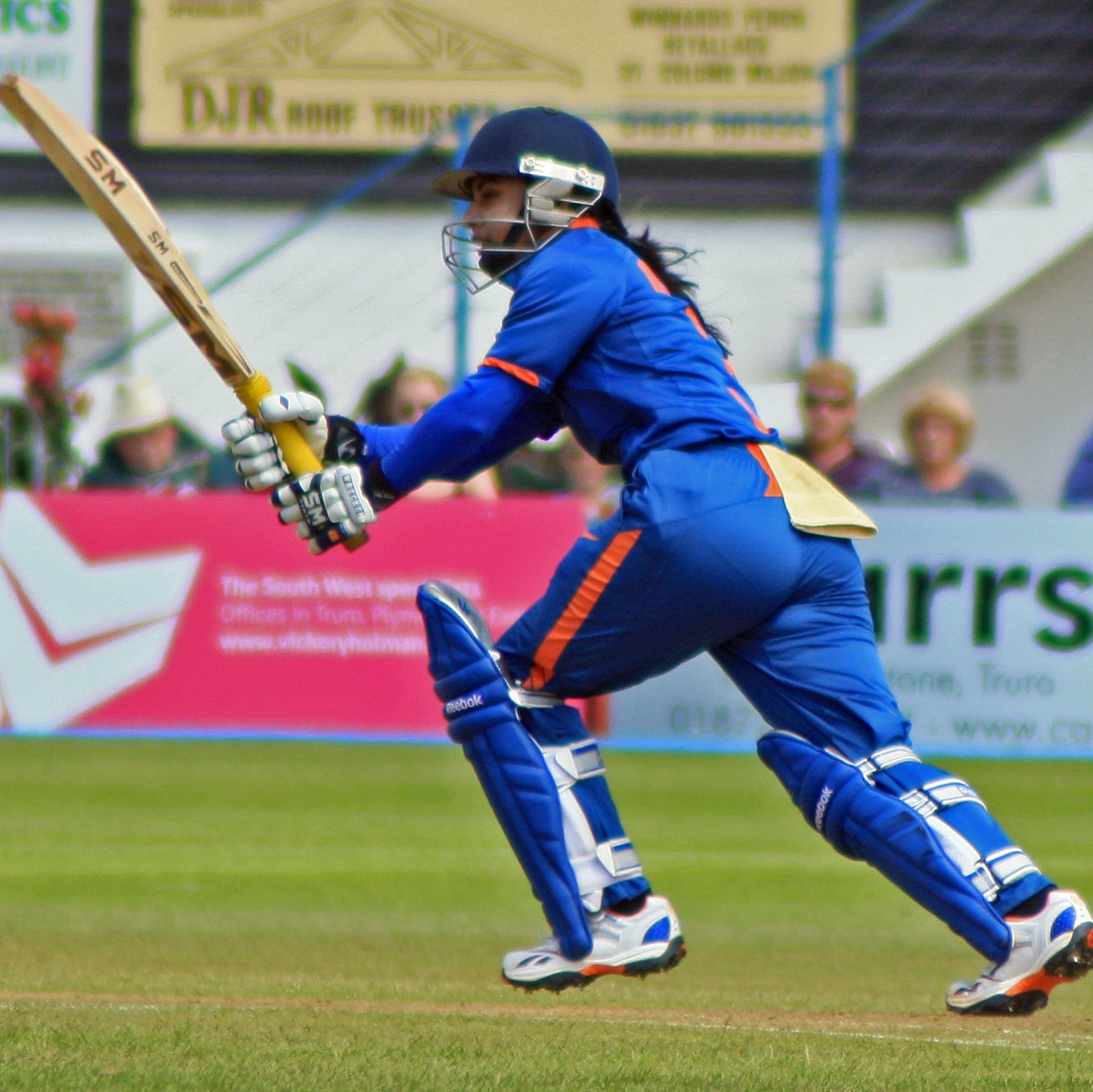
Mithali Raj has appeared in more World Cups than any other woman, equalling the record of Javed Miandad and Sachin Tendulkar in the Men's World Cup.

==== Tournaments ====
Tournaments	Player	Matches	Span
6	(India) Mithali Raj	38	2000–2022
5	(New Zealand) Debbie Hockley	45	1982–2000
5	(England) Katherine Sciver-Brunt	35	2005–2022
5	(India) Harmanpreet Kaur	35	2009–2025
5	(India) Jhulan Goswami	34	2005–2022
5	(New Zealand) Suzie Bates	34	2009–2025
5	(New Zealand) Sophie Devine	32	2009–2025
5	(Australia) Ellyse Perry	32	2009–2025
5	(South Africa) Marizanne Kapp	31	2009–2025
5	(England) Charlotte Edwards	30	1997–2013
5	(England) Clare Taylor	26	1988–2005
5	(Cricket West Indies) Anisa Mohammed	23	2005–2022
Last updated: 2 November 2025.

==== Most Matches ====
Matches	Player	Runs	Bat. Avg.	Wickets	Bowl. Avg.
45	(New Zealand) Debbie Hockley	1,501	42.88	6	27.33
38	(India) Mithali Raj	1,321	47.17	—N/a	—N/a
36	(England) Jan Brittin	1,299	43.30	5	13.60
35	(England) Katherine Sciver-Brunt	279	15.50	29	35.44
35	(India) Harmanpreet Kaur	1,136	45.44	7	41.74
Last updated: 2 November 2025.

==== Representing more than one team ====
The inclusion of Young England, the International XI, Jamaica and Trinidad and Tobago in the early years of the tournament meant that players who would otherwise have been eligible to represent their national teams played for others in the World Cup. However, only a handful also appeared for those teams at another World Cup.

The only player to represent two national teams is Nicola Payne who played for the Netherlands for 10 years and for 4 for New Zealand, which meant she appeared at 4 World Cups in total.

Player	Countries	Ref.
Sue Rattray	International XI (1973, 1982); New Zealand (1978)	
Rosalind Heggs	Young England (1973); England (1978)	
Margaret Wilks	Young England (1973); England (1978)	
Glynis Hullah	Young England (1973); England (1978, 1982)	
Megan Lear	Young England (1973); England (1978, 1982)	
Jacqueline Court	Young England (1973); England (1978, 1982)	
Susan Goatman	Young England (1973); England (1982)	
Nicola Payne	Netherlands (1988, 1993, 1997); New Zealand (2000)	

=== Most Player of the Match awards ===
No. Awards	Player	Matches	Player of the Tournament	Tournaments
8	(England) Charlotte Edwards	30	—N/a	1997–2013
5	(Australia) Karen Rolton	28	2005	1997–2009
5	(South Africa) Marizanne Kapp	31	—N/a	2009–2025
5	(Australia) Ellyse Perry	32	—N/a	2009–2025
5	(India) Mithali Raj	38	—N/a	2000–2022
5	(New Zealand) Debbie Hockley	45	—N/a	1982–2000
Last updated: 2 November 2025.

=== Most World Cup Titles ===
No. of Titles	Player	Tournaments	Ref.
3	(Australia) Sharon Tredrea	1978, 1982, 1988	

=== Age ===
A total of 94 players aged 19 years old or under have made an appearance in the World Cup and 10 players aged more than 40 have played in the competition.

Youngest Player
Age	Player	Match date	Ref.
15 years, 328 days	(South Africa) Dane van Niekerk	8 March 2009	
16 years, 28 days	(South Africa) Johmari Logtenberg	22 March 2005	
16 years, 88 days	(Cricket West Indies) Beverly Browne	23 June 1973	
16 years, 165 days	(India) Gargi Banerjee	1 January 1978	
16 years, 182 days	(Cricket West Indies) Qiana Joseph	2 July 2017	
All ages are calculated to the player's first match of the World Cup, not the start of the tournament. Last updated: 6 August 2023.

Oldest Player
Age	Player	Match date	Ref.
47 years, 337 days	(Cricket West Indies) Stephanie Power	22 March 2005	
45 years, 292 days	(England) Kay Green	14 July 1973	
43 years, 173 days	(New Zealand) Ethna Rouse	30 June 1973	
42 years, 213 days	(England) Rachael Heyhoe Flint	10 January 1982	
42 years, 166 days	(Cricket West Indies) Ann Browne	11 December 1997	
All ages are calculated to the player's first match of the World Cup, not the start of the tournament. Last updated: 6 August 2023.

=== Captaincy ===
==== Most matches as a captain ====
Matches	Player	Won	Lost	Tied	NR	Win%	Period
28	(India) Mithali Raj	16	11	0	1	57.14	2005–2022
23	(Australia) Belinda Clark	21	1	0	1	91.30	1997–2005
18	(England) Heather Knight	13	5	0	0	72.22	2017–2022
15	(Australia) Meg Lanning	13	2	0	0	86.66	2017–2022
15	(New Zealand) Trish McKelvey	7	7	1	0	46.66	1978–1982
15	(Ireland) Mary-Pat Moore	4	11	0	0	26.66	1978–1982
15	(England) Karen Smithies	12	3	0	0	80.00	1993–1997
15	(Cricket West Indies) Stafanie Taylor	5	9	0	1	33.33	2017–2022
15	(Australia) Sharon Tredrea	14	0	1	0	93.33	1982–1988
Last updated: 8 August 2023. Susan Goatman captained Young England for their 6 matches at the 1973 World Cup and then captained England for their 13 matches at the 1982 World Cup, which give her a total of 19 captaincies.

==== Best win% as a captain ====
Win%	Player	Matches	Span
93.33	(Australia) Sharon Tredrea	15	1982–1988
91.30	(Australia) Belinda Clark	23	1997–2005
86.66	(Australia) Meg Lanning	15	2017–2022
80.00	(England) Karen Smithies	15	1993–1997
78.57	(England) Charlotte Edwards	14	2009–2013
Qualification: minimum 10 matches as captain. Last updated: 7 August 2023.

== See also ==
- List of women's One Day International cricket records
