= Jennifer Sterling =

Jamaican cricketer

Personal information
- Full name: Jennifer Sterling
- Born: Jamaica
- Batting: Left-handed
- Bowling: Slow left-arm orthodox
- Role: All-rounder

International information
- National side: West Indies (1993)
- ODI debut (cap 25): 20 July 1993 v India
- Last ODI: 29 July 1993 v Ireland

Domestic team information
- Years: Team
- 1980–1994: Jamaica

Career statistics
Competition	WODI	WFC	WLA
Matches	7	9	14
Runs scored	72	93	169
Batting average	10.28	23.25	15.36
100s/50s	0/0	0/0	0/0
Top score	26	45	28
Balls bowled	253	517	331
Wickets	3	34	12
Bowling average	38.00	9.20	13.58
5 wickets in innings	0	2	1
10 wickets in match	0	0	0
Best bowling	2/19	6/50	5/15
Catches/stumpings	0/–	1/–	1/–
- Source: CricketArchive, 29 March 2022

Jennifer Sterling is a Jamaican former cricketer who played as a slow left-arm orthodox bowler and left-handed batter. She played seven One Day Internationals for the West Indies, all at the 1993 World Cup. She played domestic cricket for Jamaica.

Sterling appeared in all seven of her team's matches at the World Cup, an accomplishment shared by only three of her teammates. She scored 72 runs in total, the fourth-most for her team, behind Ann Browne, Carol-Ann James, and Eve Caesar. Her best batting performance came in the final match of the tournament, when she scored 26 from 72 balls against Ireland. As a bowler, Sterling took three wickets, and was called upon to bowl in all but one game (against New Zealand). Her best figures came in the match against Denmark, where she took 2/19 from 9.1 overs.
