= Rita Scott =

Jamaican cricketer

Personal information
- Full name: Rita Scott
- Born: Jamaica
- Batting: Right-handed
- Role: Wicket-keeper

International information
- National side: West Indies (1993–1997)
- ODI debut (cap 23): 20 July 1993 v India
- Last ODI: 20 December 1997 v Denmark

Domestic team information
- Years: Team
- 1975/76–2003: Jamaica

Career statistics
Competition	WODI	WFC	WLA
Matches	4	11	26
Runs scored	73	264	697
Batting average	24.33	33.00	34.85
100s/50s	0/1	0/1	0/5
Top score	66	50*	72*
Catches/stumpings	1/1	0/1	7/2
- Source: CricketArchive, 30 March 2022

Rita Scott is a Jamaican former cricketer who played as a right-handed batter and wicket-keeper. She appeared in four One Day Internationals for the West Indies between 1993 and 1997. She played domestic cricket for Jamaica.

== Career ==
Scott was part of the touring party for the West Indies on their 1979 tour of England as back-up wicket-keeper to Yolande Geddes-Hall. She played a total of five matches on tour, mostly against regional teams, and did not feature in any of the international games. For various reasons, the West Indies women's team played no international fixtures during the 1980s, only returning to international competition at the 1993 World Cup in England. At the World Cup, Scott was appointed vice-captain to Ann Browne. She made her One Day International (ODI) debut in the first match of the tournament, against India, but was dismissed for a three-ball duck. She made four runs in the next match, a loss to the Netherlands, and also stumped the Dutch captain Nicola Payne, off the bowling of Cherry-Ann Singh. In the following game, against Australia, Scott was forced to retire hurt while batting. She would play no further part in the tournament. Scott was retained in the West Indian squad for the 1997 World Cup in India, but made only a single appearance, in the ninth-place play-off against Denmark. Coming in fourth in the batting order, she scored 66 runs from 108 balls, putting on 155 runs for the fourth wicket with Carol-Ann James, a new team record.
