= Jønsson =

Jønsson may refer to:

- Finnur Jónsson, Danish philologist
- Halfdan Jønsson, Danish trade unionist
- Janni Jønsson, Danish cricketer
- Jens Jønsson, Danish footballer
- Karen Jønsson, Danish actress
- Pernille Jønsson, Danish cricketer
- Wili Jønsson, Danish musician

== See also ==
- Ári Jónsson, Faroese footballer
- Bjarni Jónsson, Icelandic mathematician
