= John Player Ground =

Cricket ground in Nottingham, England

Coordinates: 52.9666°N 1.1890°W

- Interactive map of John Player Ground

Ground information
- Location: Nottingham, Nottinghamshire
- Country: England
- Establishment: 1955 (first recorded match)

International information
- First women's ODI: 19 July 1990: England v Denmark
- Last women's ODI: 20 July 1993: India v West Indies

Team information
Nottinghamshire	(1970-1973)
- As of 6 September 2020; Source: Ground profile

John Player Ground was a cricket ground in Nottingham, Nottinghamshire. The first recorded match on the ground was in 1955, when the Midlands and East of England Women played the North and West of England Women.

The ground held its first List-A match in 1970 when Nottinghamshire played Hampshire in the John Player League. Between 1970 and 1973, the ground held 4 List-A matches, the last of which saw Nottinghamshire play Gloucestershire in the 1973 John Player League.

The ground has also held a number of Nottinghamshire Second XI matches in the Minor Counties Championship and Second XI Championship.

The ground has also held 3 Women's One Day Internationals, the first of which came in 1990 when England women played Denmark women. During the same year, the ground held a second Women's ODI when Ireland women played the Netherlands women. The final Women's ODI came in the 1993 Women's Cricket World Cup and saw India women played West Indies women.

Today the ground has been developed and is now covered by a leisure centre.
