= Honor Oak Cricket Club Ground =

Cricket ground in Dulwich, London, England

Coordinates: 51.4481°N 0.0953°W

- Interactive map of Honor Oak Cricket Club Ground

Ground information
- Location: Dulwich, London
- Country: England
- Establishment: 1921 (first recorded match)

International information
- Only women's ODI: 28 July 1993: Australia v Denmark
- As of 6 September 2020; Source: Ground profile

Honor Oak Cricket Club Ground is a cricket ground in Dulwich, London (formerly Surrey). In 1921 the club was described as one of the oldest and best cricket clubs in Surrey, having supplied several players to the county club. In that year Honor Oak played Guy's Hospital in a charity game in aid of blinded soldiers and sailors. The club side eleven included England player, EG Hayes. and George Abel, son of R Abel. The first archived scorecard for a match on the ground was in 1929. In 1943, the Buccaneers played Northamptonshire in a wartime charity match. In 1967, the ground hosted a single Second XI Championship match between the Surrey Second XI and the Glamorgan Second XI.

The ground hosted a single Women's One Day International in the 1993 Women's Cricket World Cup when Australia women played Denmark women.

In local domestic cricket, the ground is the home venue of Alleyn and Honor Oak Cricket Club.
