= Saskia Melchers =

Dutch cricketer

Personal information
- Born: 11 October 1962 (age 64)
- Role: Wicket-keeper

International information
- National side: Netherlands (1993)
- ODI debut (cap 31): 20 July 1993 v Australia
- Last ODI: 29 July 1993 v England

Career statistics
Competition	WODI
Matches	5
Runs scored	2
Batting average	0.66
100s/50s	0/0
Top score	2
Catches/stumpings	2/0
- Source: CricketArchive, 19 October 2015

Saskia Melchers (born 11 October 1962) is a former Dutch international cricketer who played five One Day International (ODI) matches for the Dutch national side, all of which came at the 1993 World Cup.

A wicket-keeper, Melchers was 30 years old at the time of her selection for the 1993 World Cup in England. The only specialist keeper in the Dutch squad, she went on to play in five of a possible seven matches, with Caroline de Fouw taking the gloves against India and Denmark. Melchers effected only two dismissals at the tournament, both catches, and while batting scored two runs from four innings, twice making ducks. She consequently finished with an ODI career batting average of just 0.66. Melchers' club cricket was played for VRA Amsterdam.
