= Julie Crump =

English cricketer

Julie Harris
Personal information
- Full name: Julie Lynn Harris
- Born: 7 January 1969 (age 57); Northamptonshire, England
- Batting: Right-handed
- Bowling: Right-arm medium
- Role: All-rounder

International information
- National side: England (1989)
- ODI debut (cap 56): 20 July 1989 v Denmark
- Last ODI: 21 July 1989 v Ireland

Domestic team information
- Years: Team
- 1987–1991: West Midlands
- 2000–2001: Staffordshire

Career statistics
Competition	WODI	WLA
Matches	2	20
Runs scored	–	162
Batting average	–	54.00
100s/50s	–	0/0
Top score	–	31
Balls bowled	102	852
Wickets	2	21
Bowling average	16.50	18.95
5 wickets in innings	0	0
10 wickets in match	–	–
Best bowling	1/12	4/13
Catches/stumpings	0/–	4/–
- Source: CricketArchive, 11 March 2021

Julie Lynn Harris (née Crump; born 7 January 1969) is an English former cricketer who played as an all-rounder. She was a right-arm medium bowler and right-handed batter. She appeared in two One Day Internationals for England in the 1989 Women's European Cricket Cup, against Denmark and Ireland. She took 2 wickets at an average of 16.50. She played domestic cricket for West Midlands and Staffordshire.
