= Marlene Needham =

Jamaican cricketer

Personal information
- Full name: Marlene Needham
- Born: Jamaica
- Batting: Right-handed
- Bowling: Right-arm off break
- Role: Batter

International information
- National side: West Indies (1993–1997)
- ODI debut (cap 21): 20 July 1993 v India
- Last ODI: 20 December 1997 v Denmark

Domestic team information
- Years: Team
- 1988–2001: Jamaica

Career statistics
Competition	WODI	WFC	WLA
Matches	9	8	32
Runs scored	40	251	1,087
Batting average	4.44	25.10	38.82
100s/50s	0/0	0/1	1/7
Top score	9	62	120
Balls bowled	–	–	102
Wickets	–	–	18
Bowling average	–	–	11.88
5 wickets in innings	–	–	0
10 wickets in match	–	–	0
Best bowling	–	–	4/18
Catches/stumpings	3/–	1/–	3/–
- Source: CricketArchive, 30 March 2022

Marlene Needham is a Jamaican former cricketer who played as a right-handed batter. She appeared in nine One Day Internationals (ODI) for the West Indies between 1993 and 1997. She played domestic cricket for Jamaica.

Needham made her debut for the West Indies at the 1993 World Cup in England. She appeared in five of her team's seven matches, but scored only 26 runs. Needham was retained in the West Indian squad for the 1997 World Cup in India, but again struggled for form, making only 14 runs in four matches. Against Denmark, she made the highest score of her ODI career – nine runs from 18 balls. Despite finishing with an ODI career batting average of just 4.44, Needham was dismissed for a duck only once, against New Zealand at the 1997 World Cup.
