= Roselyn Emmanuel =

Saint Lucian cricketer

Personal information
- Full name: Roselyn Emmanuel
- Born: Saint Lucia
- Batting: Right-handed
- Role: Wicket-keeper

International information
- National side: West Indies (1997)
- ODI debut (cap 34): 13 December 1997 v India
- Last ODI: 20 December 1997 v Denmark

Domestic team information
- Years: Team
- 1989–2002: Saint Lucia

Career statistics
Competition	WODI	WFC	WLA
Matches	3	2	22
Runs scored	20	23	583
Batting average	6.66	11.50	29.15
100s/50s	0/0	0/0	0/4
Top score	16	18	89
Catches/stumpings	1/1	0/0	2/1
- Source: CricketArchive, 17 March 2022

Roselyn Emmanuel is a Saint Lucian former cricketer who played as a wicket-keeper and right-handed batter. She appeared in three One Day Internationals for the West Indies at the 1997 World Cup. She also played for, and captained, the United States at the 2009 Americas Championship. She played domestic cricket for Saint Lucia.

== Career ==
Emmanuel represented the West Indies at the 1997 World Cup in India, appearing in all but one of her team's games. However, she only kept wicket against New Zealand, instead playing as a specialist opening batter in her other two appearances (against India and Denmark). Emmanuel continued playing for Saint Lucia for several years after her World Cup appearances. However, she never returned to the West Indian team. Emmanuel later emigrated to the United States, where she maintained her involvement with cricket. As one of the most experienced players in the country, she was appointed captain of the United States for the 2009 Americas Championship, its first international tournament.
