= Gwen Smith =

Trinidadian cricketer

Personal information
- Full name: Gwendolyn Smith
- Born: Trinidad
- Batting: Right-handed
- Bowling: Right-arm fast
- Role: Bowler

International information
- National side: West Indies (1997)
- ODI debut (cap 31): 11 December 1997 v Sri Lanka
- Last ODI: 20 December 1997 v Denmark

Domestic team information
- Years: Team
- 1994: Trinidad and Tobago

Career statistics
Competition	WODI	WFC
Matches	4	1
Runs scored	5	–
Batting average	2.50	–
100s/50s	0/0	–
Top score	4	–
Balls bowled	156	120
Wickets	4	2
Bowling average	21.75	27.00
5 wickets in innings	0	0
10 wickets in match	0	0
Best bowling	3/21	2/54
Catches/stumpings	3/–	0/–
- Source: CricketArchive, 28 March 2022

Gwendolyn Smith is a Trinidadian former cricketer who played as a right-arm fast bowler. She appeared in 4 One Day Internationals for the West Indies, all at the 1997 World Cup. She played domestic cricket for Trinidad and Tobago.
