= Wendy Gerritsen =

Dutch cricketer

Personal information
- Born: 6 October 1972 (age 54)
- Batting: Right-handed
- Bowling: Right-arm medium

International information
- National side: Netherlands (1992–1995)
- ODI debut (cap 32): 21 July 1993 v West Indies
- Last ODI: 20 July 1995 v Denmark

Career statistics
Competition	WODI
Matches	7
Runs scored	68
Batting average	22.66
100s/50s	0/0
Top score	20*
Balls bowled	294
Wickets	7
Bowling average	24.85
5 wickets in innings	0
10 wickets in match	0
Best bowling	3/21
Catches/stumpings	1/–
- Source: CricketArchive, 19 October 2015

Wendy Gerritsen (born 6 October 1972) is a former Dutch international cricketer whose career for the Dutch national side spanned from 1992 to 1995. A right-arm medium-pacer, she played seven One Day International (ODI) matches, including games at the 1993 World Cup.

Gerritsen made her senior debut for the Netherlands at the age of 19, on a tour of England in July 1992. Selected in the Dutch squad for the 1993 World Cup in England, she played in four of a possible seven matches. Although primarily in the team as a bowler, Gerritsen was given only 20 overs across her matches. In the last match of the tournament, against England, she took 3/38 from 12 overs, which were her only wickets of the competition. Gerritsen's only other ODIs came at the 1995 European Championship in Ireland. She opened the bowling with Jet van Noortwijk in the first match against England, but was unable to repeat her earlier performance against that team, going wicketless. She improved against Ireland, taking 1/40 from nine overs, but saved her best performance for the last match against Denmark, taking 3/21 from ten overs in what was to be her final ODI. Gerritsen finished with an ODI career bowling average of 24.85.
