= Dianne Cagen =

West Indian cricketer

Personal information
- Full name: Dianne Cagen
- Batting: Left-handed
- Bowling: Right-arm medium-fast
- Role: Bowler

International information
- National side: West Indies (1993)
- ODI debut (cap 17): 20 July 1993 v India
- Last ODI: 29 July 1993 v Ireland

Career statistics
Competition	WODI
Matches	3
Runs scored	11
Batting average	–
100s/50s	0/0
Top score	11*
Balls bowled	42
Wickets	0
Bowling average	–
5 wickets in innings	0
10 wickets in match	0
Best bowling	–
Catches/stumpings	0/–
- Source: CricketArchive, 30 March 2022

Dianne Cagen is a West Indian former cricketer who played as a right-arm medium-fast bowler. She appeared in three One Day Internationals for the West Indies, all at the 1993 World Cup.
