= Inge Kure =

Dutch cricketer (born 1965)

Personal information
- Born: 7 November 1965 (age 61)
- Batting: Right-handed
- Bowling: Right-arm medium-fast
- Role: Bowler

International information
- National side: Netherlands (1985–1993)
- ODI debut (cap 30): 20 July 1993 v Australia
- Last ODI: 29 July 1993 v England

Career statistics
Competition	WODI
Matches	6
Runs scored	7
Batting average	1.40
100s/50s	0/0
Top score	5
Balls bowled	116
Wickets	1
Bowling average	75.00
5 wickets in innings	0
10 wickets in match	0
Best bowling	1/4
Catches/stumpings	1/–
- Source: CricketArchive, 23 August 2015

Inge Kure (born 7 November 1965) is a former Dutch international cricketer whose career for the Dutch national side spanned from 1985 to 1993. She played in six One Day International (ODI) matches, all of which came at the 1993 World Cup.

A right-arm medium-fast bowler, Kure made her senior debut for the Netherlands in July 1985, when the team toured England. Aged 19 at that time, she did not again appear for the national team until 1992, on another tour of England. The following year, Kure was selected in the Dutch squad for the World Cup in England. She went on to play in six of a possible seven matches, with her debut coming in the tournament opener against Australia. Like the team as a whole, Kure had little success at the tournament – she bowled only sporadically, taking a single wicket from 19.2 overs, and her five innings as a batsman yielded seven runs and three ducks, Her one wicket had come in a rain-restricted match against India, where she had figures of 1/4 from a single over.
