= Pound Lane Cricket Ground =

Cricket ground in Marlow, Buckinghamshire

Coordinates: 51.5670°N 0.7808°W

Pound Lane
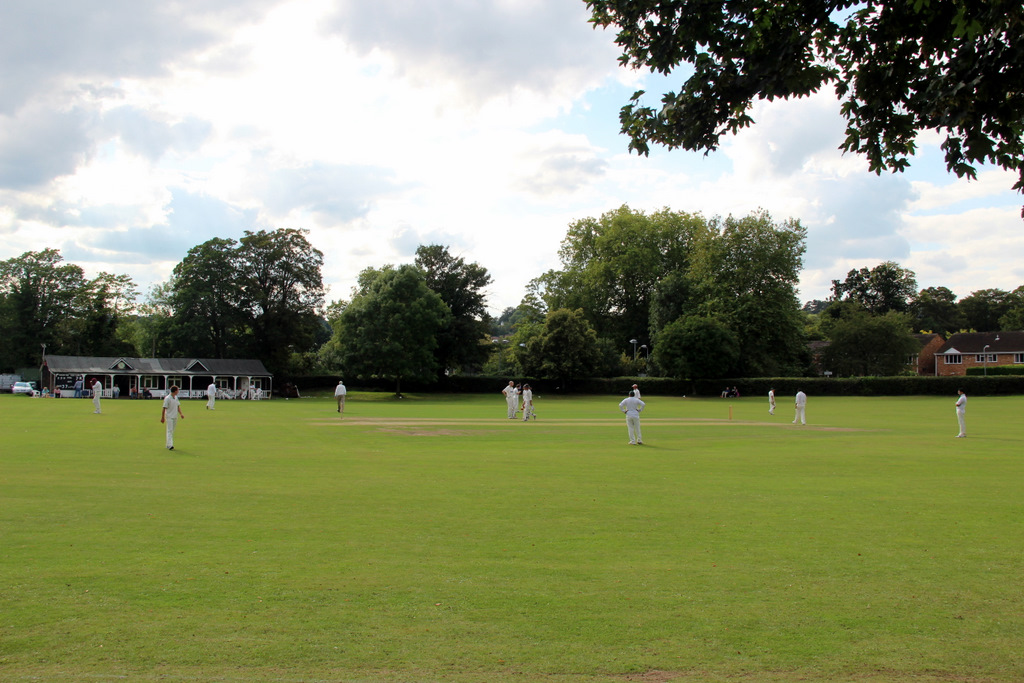
- Interactive map of Pound Lane

Ground information
- Location: Marlow, Buckinghamshire
- Country: England
- Establishment: 1909 (first recorded match)

International information
- Only women's ODI: 28 July 1993: Ireland v Netherlands

Team information
Buckinghamshire	(1909, 1913, 1973-2004, 2006 & 2010)
Minor Counties	(1990 & 1992)
- As of 6 September 2020; Source: Ground profile

Pound Lane is a cricket ground in Marlow, Buckinghamshire. The first recorded match on the ground was in 1909, when Buckinghamshire played Dorset in the Minor Counties Championship. The county next used the ground for a Minor Counties match in 1913, when it played Berkshire. Buckinghamshire next used the ground in 1973, and from 1973 to 2004 the ground has hosted 29 Minor Counties Championship matches, the last of which saw Buckinghamshire play Suffolk. The ground has also held 5 MCCA Knockout Trophy matches.

The ground has also held List-A matches. The first List-A match held on the ground was between a combined Minor Counties team played Sussex in the 1990 Benson and Hedges Cup. A combined Minor Counties team also used Pound Lane in the 1992 Benson and Hedges Cup when it played Sussex. Buckinghamshire first used the ground in the 1990 NatWest Trophy against Nottinghamshire. Buckinghamshire have played 2 further List-A matches at the ground, the last of which saw them play Warwickshire in the 1999 NatWest Trophy.

Pound Lane has also been a venue for a Women's One Day International between Ireland women and Netherlands women in the 1993 Women's Cricket World Cup.

In local domestic cricket, the ground is the home venue of Marlow Cricket Club.
