= Eugena Gregg =

Saint Lucian cricketer (born 1966)

Personal information
- Full name: Eugena Gregg
- Born: 8 February 1966 (age 60); Saint Lucia
- Batting: Right-handed
- Bowling: Right-arm medium-fast
- Role: All-rounder

International information
- National side: West Indies (1993–1997)
- ODI debut (cap 18): 20 July 1993 v India
- Last ODI: 20 December 1997 v Denmark

Domestic team information
- Years: Team
- 1989–2008: Saint Lucia

Career statistics
Competition	WODI	WFC	WLA
Matches	10	5	31
Runs scored	99	98	588
Batting average	9.90	32.66	23.52
100s/50s	0/0	0/1	0/0
Top score	26	88*	45*
Balls bowled	312	?	570
Wickets	6	2	21
Bowling average	35.33	12.50	21.40
5 wickets in innings	0	0	0
10 wickets in match	0	0	0
Best bowling	3/35	2/25	3/12
Catches/stumpings	3/–	0/–	4/–
- Source: CricketArchive, 30 March 2022

Eugena Gregg (born 8 February 1966) is a Saint Lucian former cricketer who played as a right-arm medium-fast bowler and right-handed batter. She appeared in ten One Day Internationals for the West Indies between 1993 and 1997. She played domestic cricket for Saint Lucia.

Gregg made her One Day International debut for the West Indies at the 1993 World Cup in England. She and Patricia Felicien were the only Saint Lucians in the squad, and the first Saint Lucians to be selected in any West Indies squad. At the World Cup, Gregg played in six of her team's seven matches, taking three wickets. She was retained in the squad for the 1997 World Cup in India, and appeared in every match at the tournament. In the ninth-place play-off against Denmark, she took 3/35 from seven overs, the best figures of her ODI career.
