= Cherry-Ann Singh =

Trinidadian cricketer

Personal information
- Full name: Cherry-Ann Singh
- Born: 13 February 1961 (age 65); Trinidad
- Batting: Right-handed
- Bowling: Slow left-arm orthodox
- Role: Bowler

International information
- National side: West Indies (1993)
- ODI debut (cap 24): 20 July 1993 v India
- Last ODI: 29 July 1993 v Ireland

Domestic team information
- Years: Team
- 1980–1994: Trinidad and Tobago

Career statistics
Competition	WODI	WFC	WLA
Matches	7	6	15
Runs scored	56	0	56
Batting average	9.33	0.00	9.33
100s/50s	0/0	0/0	0/0
Top score	19	0	19
Balls bowled	408	180	612
Wickets	13	17	27
Bowling average	11.84	7.00	10.25
5 wickets in innings	1	0	1
10 wickets in match	0	0	0
Best bowling	5/36	4/37	5/36
Catches/stumpings	0/–	0/–	2/–
- Source: CricketArchive, 30 March 2022

Cherry-Ann Singh (born 13 February 1961) is a Trinidadian former cricketer who played as a slow left-arm orthodox bowler. She appeared in seven One Day Internationals for the West Indies, all at the 1993 World Cup. She played domestic cricket for Trinidad and Tobago.

Singh played in all seven of the West Indies' matches at the World Cup, one of only four members of her team to do so. Against India in the first match of the tournament, which was her One Day International (ODI) debut, she took 1/14 from five overs, and also scored 17 runs coming in seventh in the batting order. Singh finished the tournament with 13 wickets, by far the most for her team – Carol-Ann James was the next-best, with eight wickets. In her final four matches, she took 2/11 against Denmark, 2/20 against New Zealand, 2/20 against England, and 5/36 against Ireland. Her performance against Ireland was the first ODI five-wicket haul by a West Indian woman, and stood as a team record until August 2011, when it was broken by Anisa Mohammed (5/5).
