= Dorking Cricket Club Ground =

Sporting venue

Coordinates: 51.24135°N 0.31976°W

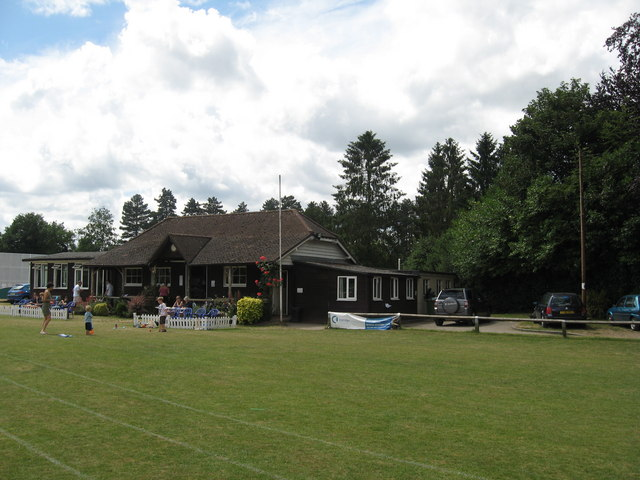

Ground information
- Location: Dorking, Surrey
- Establishment: 1993 (first recorded match)

International information
- Only WODI: 29 July 1993: Ireland v West Indies
- As of 6 September 2020; Source: Ground profile

Dorking Cricket Club Ground is a cricket ground in Dorking, Surrey. The first recorded match on the ground was in 1993, when the ground hosted a single Women's One Day International in the 1993 Women's Cricket World Cup between Ireland women and West Indies women.

In local domestic cricket, the ground is the home venue of Dorking Cricket Club.
