= Bank of England Ground =

Cricket ground in Roehampton, London, England

Coordinates: 51.4607°N 0.2557°W

- Interactive map of Bank of England Ground

Ground information
- Location: Roehampton, London
- Country: England
- Establishment: 1949 (first recorded match)

International information
- Only women's ODI: 25 July 1993: Australia v Ireland

Team information
Oxford University	(1967)
- As of September 2020; Source: Ground profile

Bank of England Ground is a cricket ground in Roehampton, London (formerly Surrey). The ground is owned by the Bank of England, and is part of the Bank of England Sports Centre. The first recorded match on the ground was in 1949, when South Women Second XI played the Women's Cricket Association.

The ground hosted its only first-class match in 1967, when Oxford University played the touring South African Universities team.

The ground also hosted a number of Second XI matches for both the Surrey Second XI and the Middlesex Second XI in the Second XI Championship between 1971 and 1982.

During the 1993 Women's Cricket World Cup, the ground held a single Women's One Day International between Ireland women and Australia women.

In local domestic cricket, the ground is the home venue of Bank of England Cricket Club. Football is also played the ground in between cricket seasons.
