= Middle Income Group Club Ground =

Cricket ground in Bandra, Mumbai

Middle Income Group Ground
Ground information
- Location: Bandra, Mumbai, Maharashtra, India
- Country: India
- Coordinates: 19°03′29.6″N 72°50′53.7″E
- Establishment: 1996
- Tenants: Mumbai

International information
- First WODI: 16 December 1997: Australia v Denmark
- Last WODI: 13 February 2013: West Indies v Australia
- As of 8 December 2019; Source: ESPNcricinfo

Middle Income Group Ground is a cricket ground in Bandra, Mumbai. The ground was host of the Women's World Cups in 1997 and 2013.

== Overview ==
In 1997, the ground hosted a match between the Australia and Danish women's team. The match came into the limelight when Belinda Clark scored the first double century in international ODI cricket and the highest in Women's ODI cricket. She scored unbeaten 229 off 155 with 22 boundaries. The match was won by Australia Women's Cricket Team by 369 runs.

In 2013, the hosted two matches between Sri Lanka Women and West Indies and then Australia and West Indies. The ground also hosted two warm-up match.
