= List of West Indies women ODI cricketers =

This is a list of West Indian women's One-day international cricketers. Overall, 98 West Indian women have played in at least one women's one-day international. A One Day International (ODI) is an international cricket match between two representative teams, each having ODI status. An ODI differs from Test matches in that the number of overs per team is limited, and that each team has only one innings. The list is arranged in the order in which each player won her first ODI cap. Where more than one player won her first ODI cap in the same match, those players are listed alphabetically by surname.

== Key ==
General

- † – Wicket-keeper
- First – Year of debut
- Last – Year of latest game
- Mat – Number of matches played

Batting

- Runs – Runs scored in career
- HS – Highest score
- Avg – Average runs scored per dismissal
- 50 – Number of half centuries
- 100 – Centuries scored
- * – Batsman remained not out

Bowling

- Balls – Balls bowled in career
- Wkt – Wickets taken in career
- BBI – Best bowling in an innings
- Ave – Average runs conceded per wicket

Fielding

- Ca – Catches taken
- St – Stumpings taken

== List of players ==
Statistics are correct as of 30 September 2026. Note that the list of players by West Indies cap number on Cricinfo also includes players who only played ODI matches for either Trinidad and Tobago or Jamaica (during the 1973 Women's Cricket World Cup where these nations competed separately instead of a West Indies side) and did not ever play for the West Indies.

West Indies Women ODI cricketers
General					Batting					Bowling					Fielding	
No.	Name	First	Last	Mat	Runs	HS	Avg	50	100	Balls	Wkt	BBI	Ave	5WI	Ca	St
1	Sheryl Bayley	1979	1979	1	—	—	—	0	0	60	0	—	—	0	2	0
2	Shirley-Ann Bonaparte	1979	1979	2	7	4	3.50	0	0	63	0	—	—	0	0	0
3	Beverly Browne^{1}	1979	1979	2	61	47	30.50	0	0	18	0	—	—	0	1	0
4	Louise Browne^{1}	1979	1979	2	82	45	41.00	0	0	—	—	—	—	—	1	0
5	Merlyn Edwards^{1}	1979	1979	2	15	9	7.50	0	0	—	—	—	—	—	0	0
6	Peggy Fairweather^{2}	1979	1979	2	3	3	3.00	0	0	126	1	1/31	48.00	0	1	0
7	Yolande Geddes-Hall †^{2}	1979	1979	2	10	7	10.00	0	0	—	—	—	—	—	0	1
8	Gloria Gill	1979	1979	2	46	31	23.00	0	0	—	—	—	—	—	3	0
9	Dorothy Hobson^{2}	1979	1979	2	—	—	—	—	—	120	3	2/35	21.66	0	0	0
10	Jasmine Sammy^{1}	1979	1979	1	30	30	30.00	0	0	6	0	—	—	0	0	0
11	Leila Williams^{2}	1979	1979	1	14	14	14.00	0	0	60	0	—	—	0	0	0
12	Patricia Alfred	1979	1979	1	1	1*	—	0	0	66	1	1/34	34.00	0	0	0
13	Vivalyn Latty-Scott	1979	1979	1	5	5	5.00	0	0	30	0	—	—	0	0	0
14	Patricia Whittaker	1979	1979	1	40	40*	—	0	0	60	3	3/36	12.00	0	0	0
15	Ann Browne	1993	1997	11	204	65*	20.40	1	0	—	—	—	—	—	3	0
16	Eve Caesar	1993	1993	6	106	78	21.20	1	0	—	—	—	—	—	2	0
17	Dianne Cagen	1993	1993	3	11	11*	—	0	0	42	0	—	—	0	0	0
18	Eugena Gregg	1993	1997	10	99	26	9.90	0	0	312	6	3/35	35.33	0	3	0
19	Carol-Ann James	1993	1997	11	250	99*	31.25	2	0	557	16	3/16	13.31	0	3	0
20	Desiree Luke	1993	1997	8	42	15	5.25	0	0	450	10	3/27	22.10	0	1	0
21	Marlene Needham	1993	1997	9	40	9	4.44	0	0	—	—	—	—	—	3	0
22	Jacqueline Robinson	1993	2004	16	127	25	9.76	0	0	644	7	2/11	52.71	0	3	0
23	Rita Scott †	1993	1997	4	73	66	24.33	1	0	—	—	—	—	—	1	1
24	Cherry-Ann Singh	1993	1993	7	56	19	9.33	0	0	408	13	5/36	11.84	1	0	0
25	Jennifer Sterling	1993	1993	7	72	26	10.28	0	0	253	3	2/19	38.00	0	0	0
26	Elaine Cunningham	1993	1993	5	18	10	4.50	0	0	167	4	3/16	19.00	0	0	0
27	Patricia Felicien	1993	1993	5	15	7*	15.00	0	0	90	0	—	—	0	0	0
28	Stephanie Power †	1993	2005	34	183	28	8.31	0	0	6	0	—	—	0	18	11
29	Verena Felicien	1997	2005	36	436	49	17.44	0	0	1791	41	4/21	21.07	0	3	0
30	Anne-Marie McEwen	1997	1997	4	14	13	4.66	0	0	99	1	1/30	76.00	0	0	0
31	Gwen Smith	1997	1997	4	5	4	2.50	0	0	156	4	3/21	21.75	0	3	0
32	Brenda Solzano-Rodney †	1997	2003	6	54	42	9.00	0	0	—	—	—	—	—	1	1
33	Envis Williams	1997	2005	21	120	28	10.00	0	0	1047	18	3/9	28.22	0	7	0
34	Roselyn Emmanuel †	1997	1997	3	20	16	6.66	0	0	—	—	—	—	—	1	1
35	Lorna McKoy	1997	1997	2	1	1	1.00	0	0	102	0	—	0	0	0	0
36	Pamela Alfred	2003	2003	4	53	40	13.25	0	0	156	3	2/32	30.33	0	2	0
37	Doris Francis	2003	2004	17	81	17	7.36	0	0	716	13	2/16	29.30	0	5	0
38	Nadine George †	2003	2008	41	622	53	16.81	1	0	—	—	—	—	—	8	1
39	Glenicia James	2003	2003	5	116	46	23.20	0	0	—	—	—	—	—	0	0
40	Debbie-Ann Lewis	2003	2009	42	279	44*	12.68	0	0	1493	29	3/16	29.55	0	12	0
41	Juliana Nero	2003	2013	76	1243	100	18.27	4	1	78	4	3/25	16.75	0	27	0
42	Shane de Silva	2003	2005	18	173	38*	15.72	0	0	243	7	2/17	27.00	0	2	0
43	Nelly Williams	2003	2005	30	620	82*	25.83	3	0	90	3	3/43	29.33	0	5	0
44	Candacy Atkins	2003	2004	11	62	19	10.33	0	0	292	4	2/30	42.75	0	0	0
45	Susan Redhead	2003	2003	3	8	6	2.66	0	0	—	—	—	—	—	0	0
46	Philipa Thomas	2003	2005	26	173	38	15.72	0	0	1167	22	4/42	31.36	0	7	0
47	Geneille Greaves	2003	2009	9	35	13	3.88	0	0	24	0	—	—	0	2	0
48	Clea Hoyte	2003	2003	3	1	1	0.50	0	0	120	2	1/13	24.50	0	0	0
49	Felicia Cummings	2003	2005	14	17	7*	4.25	0	0	582	12	3/30	28.83	0	1	0
50	Indomatie Goordial-John	2003	2005	10	40	15	10.00	0	0	421	12	4/17	16.58	0	2	0
51	Anisa Mohammed	2003	2022	141	566	31*	9.27	0	0	6252	180	7/14	20.75	6	45	0
52	Pamela Lavine	2005	2010	24	548	66*	27.40	3	0	836	19	4/17	28.21	0	5	0
53	Cordel Jack	2005	2010	20	264	81*	14.66	1	0	300	5	1/12	40.40	0	5	0
54	Kirbyina Alexander	2004	2010	20	70	16	6.36	0	0	582	17	3/6	19.52	0	3	0
55	Deandra Dottin	2008	2026	158	3894	150*	29.27	22	3	2915	84	5/34	28.65	1	48	0
56	Stacy-Ann King	2008	2019	75	885	70	15.00	1	0	1034	22	3/33	40.13	0	35	0
57	Chedean Nation	2008	2024	68	951	51*	17.29	1	0	289	7	3/22	29.57	0	12	0
58	Shakera Selman	2008	2022	100	249	22	10.37	0	0	3657	82	5/15	27.10	1	31	0
59	Danielle Small	2008	2010	12	82	37*	11.71	0	0	389	8	3/27	26.87	0	1	0
60	Stafanie Taylor	2008	2026	182	6396	171	43.21	42	10	5850	157	4/17	22.28	0	73	0
61	Afy Fletcher	2008	2026	101	531	36*	10.41	0	0	4433	132	4/20	24.20	0	17	0
62	Charlene Taitt	2008	2010	16	173	47	13.30	0	0	390	6	1/9	37.00	0	3	0
63	Merissa Aguilleira †	2008	2018	112	1752	71	20.61	6	0	—	—	—	—	—	78	26
64	Lee-Ann Kirby	2008	2008	4	40	21*	20.00	0	0	66	3	2/12	14.00	0	0	0
65	Gaitri Seetahal	2008	2008	3	3	3	3.00	0	0	90	1	1/31	49.00	0	1	0
66	Shanel Daley	2008	2017	70	1001	63	19.62	3	0	2977	73	4/29	23.30	0	23	0
67	Amanda Samaroo	2009	2009	3	25	16	8.33	0	0	12	0	—	—	0	1	0
68	Shemaine Campbelle ‡†	2009	2026	142	2109	105	20.08	6	1	1277	21	2/13	35.85	0	70	14
69	Britney Cooper	2009	2021	49	575	55*	16.42	1	0	—	—	—	—	—	24	0
70	Tremayne Smartt	2009	2018	57	157	13	6.03	0	0	2121	37	5/24	35.97	1	9	0
71	Subrina Munroe	2010	2014	23	9	5	4.50	0	0	876	11	3/15	51.54	0	7	0
72	Pearl Etienne	2010	2012	8	14	5*	7.00	0	0	240	7	3/16	17.28	0	0	0
73	June Ogle	2011	2013	6	18	9	3.60	0	0	—	—	—	—	—	1	0
74	Kycia Knight †	2011	2022	87	1327	69	17.46	2	0	4	0	—	—	0	29	5
75	Shaquana Quintyne	2011	2016	40	482	42	17.85	0	0	1330	35	4/14	24.48	0	9	0
76	Natasha McLean	2012	2022	33	441	82	14.70	2	0	—	—	—	—	—	6	0
77	Kyshona Knight	2013	2022	51	851	88	21.27	1	0	48	1	1/3	54.00	0	17	0
78	Chinelle Henry	2014	2026	66	940	61	18.07	4	0	1616	33	3/19	41.87	0	32	0
79	Vanessa Watts	2014	2014	1	18	18	18.00	0	0	60	1	1/43	43.00	0	0	0
80	Shamilia Connell	2014	2024	72	130	15*	6.84	0	0	2530	50	4/54	40.06	0	11	0
81	Hayley Matthews	2014	2026	111	3892	182	38.15	8	14	4976	142	4/15	24.07	0	66	0
82	Erva Giddings	2016	2016	2	4	3	4.00	0	0	60	1	1/7	22.00	0	1	0
83	Felicia Walters	2017	2017	2	16	9	8.00	0	0	—	—	—	—	—	0	0
84	Reniece Boyce †	2017	2021	6	42	14	7.00	0	0	—	—	—	—	—	1	2
85	Qiana Joseph	2017	2026	31	486	70	19.44	3	0	490	13	2/24	31.23	0	4	0
86	Akeira Peters	2017	2018	6	6	4	1.20	0	0	84	1	1/20	71.00	0	0	0
87	Karishma Ramharack	2019	2026	54	163	15*	7.76	0	0	2222	56	4/12	30.85	0	19	0
88	Shabika Gajnabi	2019	2025	28	169	22	7.68	0	0	144	5	2/25	26.00	0	16	0
89	Sheneta Grimmond	2019	2022	9	79	34	13.16	0	0	253	5	4/33	41.80	0	2	0
90	Aaliyah Alleyne	2019	2026	58	576	44	16.00	0	0	1662	55	4/39	27.76	0	19	0
91	Shawnisha Hector	2019	2026	5	24	13	12.00	0	0	96	0	—	—	0	1	0
92	Caneisha Isaac	2021	2021	1	—	—	—	—	—	24	0	—	—	0	0	0
93	Rashada Williams †	2021	2024	37	485	78*	15.15	2	0	—	—	—	—	—	10	3
94	Cherry-Ann Fraser	2021	2025	19	89	24	8.90	0	0	468	10	2/20	47.10	0	1	0
95	Mandy Mangru	2022	2025	6	31	15	7.75	0	0	18	0	—	—	0	5	0
96	Kaysia Schultz	2022	2022	1	0	0	0.00	0	0	42	2	2/52	26.00	0	1	0
97	Zaida James	2023	2026	30	231	45	10.04	0	0	582	13	5/45	36.00	1	4	0
98	Ashmini Munisar	2023	2026	13	33	20*	6.60	0	0	486	13	2/15	26.07	0	4	0
99	Djenaba Joseph	2023	2023	1	0	0	0.00	0	0	—	—	—	—	—	0	0
100	Nerissa Crafton	2024	2024	1	13	13	13.00	0	0	—	—	—	—	—	0	0
101	Jannillea Glasgow	2025	2026	21	272	50	18.13	2	0	441	8	2/37	44.75	0	6	0
102	Jahzara Claxton	2025	2026	12	152	43	19.00	0	0	156	1	1/48	226.00	0	5	0
103	Realeanna Grimmond	2025	2026	11	258	91	23.45	3	0	—	—	—	—	—	7	0
104	Shunelle Sawh†	2026	2026	1	3	3	3.00	0	0	—	—	—	—	—	0	0

Notes:

- ^{1} These players also played ODI cricket for Trinidad and Tobago. Only their records for the West Indies are shown above. See List of Trinidad and Tobago women ODI cricketers for their records for Trinidad and Tobago.
- ^{2} These players also played ODI cricket for Jamaica. Only their records for the West Indies are shown above. See List of Jamaica women ODI cricketers for their records for Jamaica.

== See also ==
- West Indian women's cricket team
- List of West Indian women's Test cricketers
- List of West Indian men's ODI cricketers
