= Collingham and Linton Cricket Club Ground =

Cricket ground in West Yorkshire, England

Coordinates: 53.90756°N 1.41632°W

Collingham and Linton Cricket Club
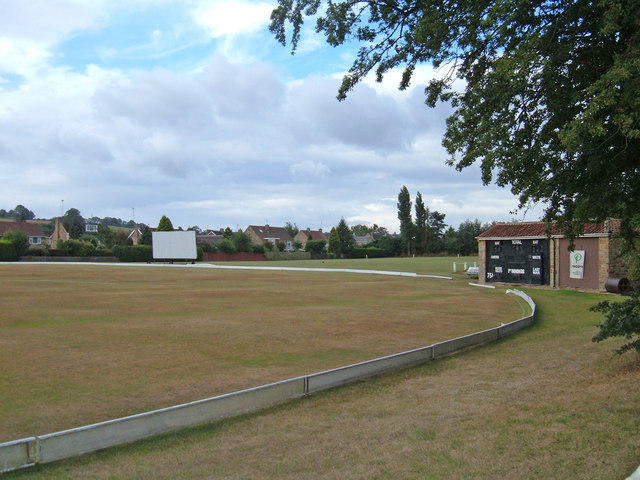

Ground information
- Location: Collingham, West Yorkshire
- Establishment: 1986 (first recorded match)

International information
- First women's Test: 26–30 June 1986: England v India
- Last women's Test: 21–25 August 1987: England v Australia
- Only WODI: 21 July 1993: Australia v India
- As of 5 September 2020; Source: Ground profile

Collingham and Linton Cricket Club is a cricket ground in Collingham, West Yorkshire. The first recorded match on the ground was in 1896.

In 1986 the club hosted the first Women's Test between England women and India women. The following year the ground hosted its second and final Women's Test between England women and Australia women. In 1993, the ground held a Women's One Day International between England women and Australia women in the 1993 Women's Cricket World Cup.

In local domestic cricket, the ground is the home venue of Collingham and Linton Cricket Club.
