= Recreation Ground, Banstead =

Cricket ground in England

Coordinates: 51.3217°N 0.1969°W

Recreation Ground
- Interactive map of Recreation Ground

Ground information
- Location: Banstead, Surrey
- Country: England
- Establishment: 1840

International information
- First women's ODI: 27 July 1986: England v India
- Last women's ODI: 20 July 1993: England v Denmark

Team information
Surrey	(1984)
- As of 6 September 2020; Source: Ground profile

The Recreation Ground is a cricket ground in Banstead, Surrey. The first recorded match on the ground was in 1955, when South Women Second XI played the Women's Cricket Association. It hosted its only first-class match in 1984, when Surrey played Cambridge University.

Additionally, between 1983 and 2006, the ground played host to a number of Surrey Second XI matches in the Second XI Championship and Second XI Trophy, hosting a combined total of 20 Second XI matches.

The ground has also hosted 2 Women's One Day International's. The first came in 1986 and was played between England women and India women. The second was played between England women and Denmark women in 1993 Women's Cricket World Cup.

In local domestic cricket, the Recreation Ground is the home venue of Banstead Cricket Club who play in the Surrey Premier League. The original pavilion was constructed in the 1890s and still stands to this day, although a new pavilion was built in the 1970s.
