= Desiree Luke =

Trinidadian cricketer

Personal information
- Full name: Desiree Luke
- Born: Trinidad
- Batting: Right-handed
- Bowling: Right-arm off break
- Role: Bowler

International information
- National side: West Indies (1993–1997)
- ODI debut (cap 20): 20 July 1993 v India
- Last ODI: 15 December 1997 v New Zealand

Domestic team information
- Years: Team
- 1989–1994: Trinidad and Tobago

Career statistics
Competition	WODI	WFC	WLA
Matches	8	4	11
Runs scored	42	–	42
Batting average	5.25	–	5.25
100s/50s	0/0	–	0/0
Top score	15	–	15
Balls bowled	450	?	510
Wickets	10	15	19
Bowling average	22.10	4.57	16.10
5 wickets in innings	0	1	0
10 wickets in match	0	0	0
Best bowling	3/27	5/9	4/35
Catches/stumpings	1/–	0/–	1/–
- Source: CricketArchive, 30 March 2022

Desiree Luke is a Trinidadian former cricketer who played as a right-arm off break bowler. She appeared in eight One Day Internationals for the West Indies between 1993 and 1997. She played domestic cricket for Trinidad and Tobago.

Luke made her One-Day International at the 1993 World Cup in England. She appeared in five of her team's seven matches, and took four wickets, with the best of 3/27 against England. Luke was retained in the West Indian squad for the 1997 World Cup in India. In three matches at that tournament, she took six wickets – 2/12 against Sri Lanka, 1/24 against India, and 3/57 against New Zealand.
