= Malene Iversen =

Danish cricketer (born 1976)

Personal information
- Full name: Malene Iversen
- Born: 27 December 1976 (age 49)
- Batting: Right-handed
- Role: Wicket-keeper

International information
- National side: Denmark
- ODI debut (cap 23): 24 July 1993 v New Zealand
- Last ODI: 20 July 1999 v England

Career statistics
Competition	WODI
Matches	17
Runs scored	112
Batting average	8.00
100s/50s	0/0
Top score	22*
Balls bowled	54
Wickets	0
Bowling average	–
5 wickets in innings	–
10 wickets in match	–
Best bowling	–
Catches/stumpings	5/9
- Source: Cricinfo, 28 September 2020

Malene Iversen is a Danish former international cricketer who played for the Denmark women's national cricket team between 1993 and 1999. She was a wicket-keeper and played domestic cricket for Herning Cricket Club. Iversen made her One Day International (ODI) debut against New Zealand in July 1993. She played her last ODI, against England, six years later in July 1999.

In April 2024 she became assistant coach and physical trainer for the Denmark men's national goalball team.
