= Mette Frost =

Danish cricketer

Personal information
- Full name: Mette Frost
- Batting: Right-handed
- Bowling: Right-arm leg-spin
- Role: Wicket-keeper

International information
- National side: Denmark
- ODI debut (cap 13): 18 July 1990 v Ireland
- Last ODI: 21 July 1999 v Netherlands

Career statistics
Competition	WODI
Matches	23
Runs scored	295
Batting average	14.04
100s/50s	0/1
Top score	50
Balls bowled	120
Wickets	2
Bowling average	45.00
5 wickets in innings	0
10 wickets in match	0
Best bowling	2/37
Catches/stumpings	14/4
- Source: Cricinfo, 27 September 2020

Mette Frost is a Danish former international cricketer who represented the Danish women's team in 23 One Day International matches between 1990 and 1999.

Frost usually batted in the upper order, and occasionally bowled leg-spin and kept wickets. She made her highest score of 50, which was also the highest score in the match, when she opened the batting in the victory over the Netherlands in 1998. In the 1993 Women's Cricket World Cup, Frost made Denmark's highest individual score of 37.

In Denmark, she played domestic cricket for Glostrup Cricket Club.
