= Elaine Cunningham (cricketer) =

Jamaican cricketer

Personal information
- Full name: Elaine Cunningham
- Role: All-rounder

International information
- National side: West Indies (1993)
- ODI debut (cap 26): 24 July 1993 v Australia
- Last ODI: 29 July 1993 v Ireland

Domestic team information
- Years: Team
- 1975/76–1999: Jamaica

Career statistics
Competition	WODI	WFC	WLA
Matches	5	6	17
Runs scored	18	82	211
Batting average	4.50	11.71	15.07
100s/50s	0/0	0/0	0/0
Top score	10	37	33
Balls bowled	167	12	263
Wickets	4	2	7
Bowling average	19.00	20.00	23.00
5 wickets in innings	0	0	0
10 wickets in match	0	0	0
Best bowling	3/16	2/24	3/16
Catches/stumpings	0/–	2/–	0/–
- Source: CricketArchive, 28 March 2022

Elaine Cunningham is a Jamaican former cricketer who played as an all-rounder. She appeared in five One Day Internationals for the West Indies, all at the 1993 Women's Cricket World Cup. She played domestic cricket for Jamaica.
