= Meir Heath Cricket Club =

Cricket club and ground in Staffordshire

Coordinates: 52°57′01″N 2°05′58″W

Ground information
- Location: Meir Heath, Staffordshire
- Establishment: 1991 (first recorded match)

International information
- Only WODI: 21 July 1993: Netherlands v West Indies

Team information
Staffordshire	(1991-1993)
- As of 6 September 2020; Source: Ground profile

Meir Heath Cricket Club is a cricket club and ground in Meir Heath, Staffordshire. The first recorded match on the ground was in 1991, when Staffordshire played Shropshire in the grounds only MCCA Knockout Trophy match. In 1992, it held its first Minor Counties Championship match which saw Staffordshire play Suffolk. The following year, the ground held its second and to date final Minor Counties Championship match, which was between Staffordshire and Lincolnshire.

The ground has also held a single Women's One Day International between the Netherlands women and West Indies women in the 1993 Women's Cricket World Cup.

In local domestic cricket, Meir Heath Cricket Club use the ground as their home venue.
