= Danish Cricket Federation =

Sports governing body in Denmark

Danish Cricket Federation Dansk Cricket Forbund
- Sport: Cricket
- Jurisdiction: Denmark
- Founded: 1953
- Affiliation: International Cricket Council
- Affiliation date: 1966 (associate member)
- Regional affiliation: ICC Europe
- Headquarters: Brøndby, Copenhagen
- Chairman: Umair Butt
- Secretary: Alex Olsen

Official website
- cricket.dk
- (Denmark)

The Danish Cricket Federation (Danish: Dansk Cricket Forbund; DCF) is the official governing body of the sport of cricket in the Kingdom of Denmark. Its headquarters is currently based in Brøndby, Copenhagen.

== History ==
The DCF was founded in 1953, at a meeting of 31 clubs in Odense. Cricket in Denmark had previously been organised by the Danish Football Association, a consequence of both sports being introduced by British expatriates. The organisation joined the International Cricket Council (ICC) in 1966, as an associate member, and was later also a founding member of the European Cricket Council.

In the year 1840, a few Danish high school teachers were on a study visit to England and brought back the basics of the game of cricket to Denmark. Later in the 1860s the English railway engineers who constructed the railway tracks through Denmark founded cricket clubs in the cities of Randers and Odense. Further, the famous Danish fairy tale author Hans Christian Andersen mentions in his diary from 1857 that he was playing cricket while visiting Charles Dickens in England and he got an injured finger hitting the ball. Many cricket clubs combined the cricket activities with football which meant that cricket was organized by the Danish Football Association, called Dansk Boldspil Union (DBU).

== See also ==
- Denmark national cricket team
- Denmark women's national cricket team
- Denmark national under-19 cricket team
