= Jane Jensen (cricketer) =

Danish cricketer

Personal information
- Full name: Jane Jensen
- Batting: Right-handed
- Role: Batsman

International information
- National side: Denmark
- ODI debut (cap 15): 18 July 1990 v Ireland
- Last ODI: 29 July 1993 v India

Career statistics
Competition	WODI
Matches	10
Runs scored	103
Batting average	11.44
100s/50s	0/0
Top score	49
Catches/stumpings	2/–
- Source: Cricinfo, 27 September, 2020

Jane Jensen is a Danish former international cricketer who represented the Danish national team between 1990 and 1993.
