= Pia Thomsen =

Danish cricketer

Personal information
- Full name: Pia Thomsen
- Role: Batsman

International information
- National side: Denmark
- ODI debut (cap 22): 20 July 1993 v England
- Last ODI: 28 July 1993 v Australia

Career statistics
Competition	WODI
Matches	5
Runs scored	16
Batting average	5.00
100s/50s	0/0
Top score	12*
Catches/stumpings	2/0
- Source: Cricinfo, 28 September 2020

Pia Thomsen is a Danish former international cricketer who represented the Danish national team in 1993. She played for Nykøbing Mors Cricket Club in domestic matches.
