= Pernille Jønsson =

Danish cricketer

Personal information
- Full name: Pernille Jønsson
- Role: Batsman
- Relatives: Janni Jønsson (sister)

International information
- National side: Denmark
- ODI debut (cap 20): 20 July 1993 v England
- Last ODI: 29 July 1993 v India

Career statistics
Competition	WODI
Matches	4
Runs scored	3
Batting average	3.00
100s/50s	0/0
Top score	2
Balls bowled	12
Wickets	0
Bowling average	–
5 wickets in innings	0
10 wickets in match	0
Best bowling	–
Catches/stumpings	0/0
- Source: Cricinfo, 28 September 2020

Pernille Jønsson is a Danish former international cricketer who represented the Danish national team in 1993. She played domestic cricket for Glostrup Cricket Club.
