= Heidi Kjær =

Danish cricketer

Personal information
- Full name: Heidi Kjær
- Role: All-rounder

International information
- National side: Denmark
- ODI debut (cap 18): 20 July 1990 v Netherlands
- Last ODI: 18 December 1997 v South Africa

Career statistics
Competition	WODI
Matches	16
Runs scored	34
Batting average	3.40
100s/50s	0/0
Top score	12*
Balls bowled	677
Wickets	3
Bowling average	142.00
5 wickets in innings	0
10 wickets in match	0
Best bowling	2/24
Catches/stumpings	2/-
- Source: Cricinfo, 28 September 2020

Heidi Kjær is a Danish former international cricketer who represented the Danish national team between 1990 and 1997.
