= Karin Mikkelsen =

Danish cricketer

Personal information
- Full name: Karin Mikkelsen
- Role: Batsman

International information
- National side: Denmark
- ODI debut (cap 21): 20 July 1993 v England
- Last ODI: 21 July 1999 v Netherlands

Career statistics
Competition	WODI
Matches	20
Runs scored	297
Batting average	17.47
100s/50s	0/0
Top score	42*
Balls bowled	84
Wickets	1
Bowling average	83.00
5 wickets in innings	0
10 wickets in match	0
Best bowling	1/53
Catches/stumpings	4/-
- Source: Cricinfo, 28 September 2020

Karin Mikkelsen is a Danish former international cricketer who represented the Danish women's national team between 1993 and 1999.

In the 20 one-day internationals that she played, Mikkelsen scored 297 runs at an average of 17.47.
