= Dorte Christiansen =

Danish cricketer

Personal information
- Full name: Dorte Christiansen
- Batting: Right-handed
- Bowling: Right-arm spin
- Role: All-rounder
- Relatives: Trine Christiansen (sister)

International information
- National side: Denmark
- ODI debut (cap 19): 16 July 1991 v Netherlands
- Last ODI: 20 December 1997 v West Indies

Career statistics
Competition	WODI
Matches	21
Runs scored	175
Batting average	8.75
100s/50s	0/0
Top score	35
Balls bowled	556
Wickets	11
Bowling average	42.63
5 wickets in innings	0
10 wickets in match	0
Best bowling	3/22
Catches/stumpings	3/-
- Source: Cricinfo, 28 September 2020

Dorte Christiansen is a Danish former international cricketer who represented the Danish national team between 1983 and 1999. She played domestic cricket for Svanholm Cricket Club and was a spin bowler and top-order batter.
