= Julie Calvert =

Australian cricketer (1964–2025)

Personal information
- Born: 23 February 1964; Melbourne, Victoria
- Died: 30 August 2025 (aged 61); Melbourne, Victoria
- Batting: Right-handed
- Role: Wicket-keeper

International information
- National side: Australia
- ODI debut (cap 70): 24 July 1993 v West Indies
- Last ODI: 22 January 1994 v New Zealand

Domestic team information
- Years: Team
- 1986/87–1996/97: Victoria

Career statistics
Competition	ODI	FC	LA
Matches	6	19	56
Runs scored	96	487	1,112
Batting average	24.00	23.19	26.47
100s/50s	0/0	0/1	0/4
Top score	34	66	65
Catches/stumpings	0/0	19/3	19/10
- Source: CricInfo, 7 August 2025

Julie Calvert (23 February 1964 – 30 August 2025) was an Australian cricket player.

Calvert played domestic cricket for the Victorian state women's cricket team between 1986 and 1997. She played eleven matches in the inaugural season of the Women's National Cricket League.

Calvert played six One Day Internationals for the Australia national women's cricket team.
