= Vibeke Nielsen =

Danish cricketer (born 1959)

Personal information
- Born: 1959 (age 66–67); Denmark

International information
- National side: Denmark
- ODI debut (cap 9): 19 July 1989 v Ireland
- Last ODI: 21 July 1999 v Netherlands

Career statistics
| Competition | WODI |
|---|---|
| Matches | 26 |
| Runs scored | 275 |
| Batting average | 11.00 |
| 100s/50s | 0/0 |
| Top score | 33 |
| Catches/stumpings | 5/– |
- Source: Cricinfo, 26 September 2020

Vibeke G. Nielsen (born 1959) is a Danish former cricketer. She played 26 Women's One Day International matches for the Denmark women's national cricket team between 1989 and 1999. She scored a total of 275 ODI runs, at an average of 11 runs per innings and a high score of 33.

A civil engineer by profession, Nielsen played as an opening batter and represented Akademisk Boldklub in domestic cricket.
