= Marlene Slebsager =

Danish cricketer (born 1966)

Personal information
- Full name: Marlene Slebsager
- Born: 1966 (age 59–60); Denmark
- Bowling: Fast-medium
- Role: All-rounder

International information
- National side: Denmark
- ODI debut (cap 10): 19 July 1989 v Ireland
- Last ODI: 21 July 1999 v Netherlands

Career statistics
Competition	WODI
Matches	21
Runs scored	114
Batting average	11.40
100s/50s	0/0
Top score	13*
Balls bowled	906
Wickets	12
Bowling average	42.66
5 wickets in innings	0
10 wickets in match	0
Best bowling	3/25
Catches/stumpings	3/–
- Source: Cricinfo, 26 September 2020

Marlene Slebsager (born 1966) is a Danish former international cricketer who represented the Danish national team between 1989 and 1999. She was a fast-medium bowler and represented Svanholm Cricket Club in domestic matches.
