= Meir Heath =

Village in Staffordshire, England

Coordinates: 52.95800°N 2.10700°W

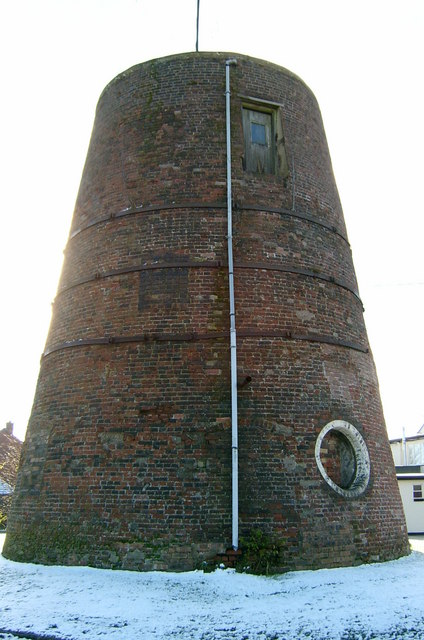
- An old windmill situated in the grounds of The Windmill pub, Meir Heath

- Location within Staffordshire
- OS grid reference: SJ92924003
- Unitary authority: Stoke-on-Trent
- Ceremonial county: Staffordshire
- Region: West Midlands
- Country: England
- Sovereign state: United Kingdom
- Post town: Stoke-on-Trent
- Postcode district: ST3
- Dialling code: 01782
- Police: Staffordshire
- Fire: Staffordshire
- Ambulance: West Midlands
- UK Parliament: Stoke-on-Trent South

Meir Heath (also known as Meirheath) is a village on the southern fringe of Stoke-on-Trent, Staffordshire. It is situated in a relatively elevated location between Meir and Rough Close, 2 1/2 miles from Barlaston and 5 miles from Stone.

The hilltop village features a Grade 2 listed windmill standing in the car park of a pub which is itself named The Windmill.

Just outside the village is the Kings Park football ground. Until 2010 this was the home of Meir King's Arms Football Club which disolved in that year. In 2021 Stone Old Alleynians moved relocated there in order to meet the ground grading requirements for the Midland Football League Premier Division. Other facilities on that south side of the village are Meir Heath Cricket Club and Meir Heath Academy, serving both Meir Heath itself and nearby Meir Park.
