= Mette Gregersen =

Danish cricketer

Personal information
- Full name: Mette Gregersen
- Batting: Right-handed
- Bowling: Medium-fast
- Role: Bowler

International information
- National side: Denmark
- ODI debut (cap 17): 20 July 1990 v Netherlands
- Last ODI: 21 July 1999 v Netherlands

Career statistics
Competition	WODI
Matches	18
Runs scored	60
Batting average	3.22
100s/50s	0/0
Top score	22
Balls bowled	531
Wickets	14
Bowling average	19.07
5 wickets in innings	0
10 wickets in match	0
Best bowling	4/6
Catches/stumpings	4/-
- Source: Cricinfo, 28 September 2020

Mette Gregersen is a Danish former international cricketer who represented the Denmark national women's team from 1990 to 1999. She was a swing bowler and played domestic cricket for Århus Cricket Club.
