= Lindfield Cricket Club Ground =

Cricket ground in Lindfield, Sussex, England

Coordinates: 51.00912°N 0.08177°W

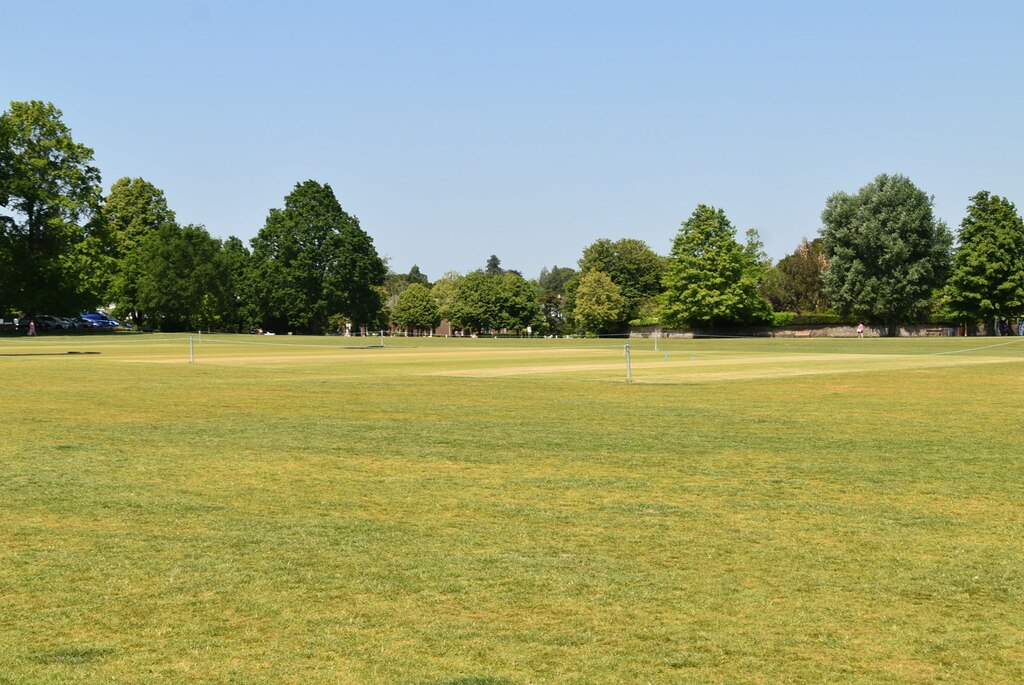
- Interactive map of Lindfield Cricket Club Ground

Ground information
- Location: Lindfield, Sussex
- Country: England
- Establishment: 1948 (first recorded match)

International information
- Only WODI: 25 July 1993: New Zealand v Netherlands
- As of 6 September 2020; Source: Ground profile

Lindfield Cricket Club Ground is a cricket ground in Lindfield, Sussex. The first recorded match on the ground was in 1948, when the Sussex Second XI played the Essex Second XI in the Minor Counties Championship. In 1993, the ground held a Women's One Day International between Netherlands women and New Zealand women in the 1993 Women's Cricket World Cup.

In local domestic cricket, the ground is the home venue of Lindfield Cricket Club.
