= Eve Caesar =

Trinidadian cricketer

Personal information
- Full name: Eve Caesar
- Died: 2002; Tobago
- Batting: Left-handed
- Bowling: Slow left-arm orthodox
- Role: Batter

International information
- National side: West Indies (1993)
- ODI debut (cap 16): 20 July 1993 v India
- Last ODI: 29 July 1993 v Ireland

Domestic team information
- Years: Team
- 1989–1996: Trinidad and Tobago

Career statistics
Competition	WODI	WFC	WLA
Matches	6	5	11
Runs scored	106	142	280
Batting average	21.20	35.50	31.11
100s/50s	0/1	0/1	0/3
Top score	78	55	78
Catches/stumpings	2/–	1/–	2/–
- Source: CricketArchive, 30 March 2022

Eve Caesar was a Trinidadian cricketer who played as a left-handed batter. She appeared in six One Day Internationals for the West Indies, all at the 1993 World Cup. She made her ODI high score in her final match, scoring 78 against Ireland. She played domestic cricket for Trinidad and Tobago.

In February 2019, Caesar was recognized as an "Icon" in the field of cricket at the Trinidad and Tobago Division of Sport and Youth Affairs annual Sports Awards Ceremony of 2018.
