= Patricia Felicien =

Saint Lucian cricketer (1967–1997)

Patsy Felicien
Personal information
- Full name: Bernadette Patricia Felicien
- Born: 12 January 1967; Saint Lucia
- Died: 27 February 1997 (aged 30); Saint Lucia
- Batting: Left-handed
- Bowling: Right-arm medium
- Role: All-rounder
- Relatives: Verena Felicien (aunt)

International information
- National side: West Indies (1993)
- ODI debut (cap 27): 24 July 1993 v Australia
- Last ODI: 29 July 1993 v Ireland

Domestic team information
- Years: Team
- 1988–1994: Saint Lucia

Career statistics
Competition	WODI	WFC	WLA
Matches	5	5	7
Runs scored	15	144	107
Batting average	15.00	48.00	35.66
100s/50s	0/0	0/1	0/1
Top score	7*	73	62
Balls bowled	90	?	90
Wickets	0	6	0
Bowling average	–	10.50	–
5 wickets in innings	0	0	0
10 wickets in match	0	0	0
Best bowling	–	4/29	–
Catches/stumpings	0/–	1/–	0/–
- Source: CricketArchive, 28 March 2022

Bernadette Patricia Felicien (12 January 1967 – 27 February 1997) was a Saint Lucian cricketer who played as a right-handed batter and right-arm pace bowler. She appeared in five One Day Internationals for the West Indies, all at the 1993 World Cup in England. She played domestic cricket for Saint Lucia.

Felicien played in five of her team's seven matches at the World Cup, making her debut in the third match of the tournament, against Australia. She and Eugena Gregg were the only Saint Lucians in the squad, and the first Saint Lucians to be selected in any West Indies squad. Felicien was given little game time, batting in the lower order and bowling only 15 overs, without taking a wicket. Against New Zealand, she was out leg before wicket to Julie Harris for a golden duck, giving Harris her hat-trick. Felicien died in a motor vehicle accident on 27 February 1997, at the age of 29. Her aunt, Verena Felicien, later captained the West Indies.
