= Janni Jønsson =

Danish cricketer (born 1968)

Personal information
- Full name: Janni Jønsson
- Born: 1968 (age 57–58); Denmark
- Batting: Right-handed
- Bowling: Right-hand medium
- Role: All-rounder
- Relatives: Pernille Jønsson (sister)

International information
- National side: Denmark (1989–1999)
- ODI debut (cap 4): 19 July 1989 v Ireland
- Last ODI: 21 July 1999 v Netherlands

Domestic team information
- Years: Team
- 1987: Sussex

Career statistics
| Competition | WODI | WLA |
|---|---|---|
| Matches | 32 | 36 |
| Runs scored | 388 | 532 |
| Batting average | 12.93 | 16.12 |
| 100s/50s | 0/1 | 0/2 |
| Top score | 53 | 61* |
| Balls bowled | 1,870 | 1,870 |
| Wickets | 35 | 35 |
| Bowling average | 24.77 | 24.77 |
| 5 wickets in innings | 0 | 0 |
| 10 wickets in match | 0 | 0 |
| Best bowling | 4/38 | 4/38 |
| Catches/stumpings | 8/– | 8/– |
- Source: CricketArchive, 21 April 2022

Janni Jønsson (born 1968) is a Danish former cricketer. An all-rounder, she played as a right-handed batter and right-arm medium-fast bowler. She appeared in 32 One Day Internationals for Denmark between 1989 and 1999, and captained the side between 1983 and 1999. She played domestic cricket for Sussex.

In Denmark, Jønsson played club cricket for Glostrup Cricket Club and worked as a social worker outside of sport.
