= Carol-Ann James =

West Indian cricketer

Personal information
- Full name: Carol-Ann James
- Born: Trinidad
- Batting: Right-handed
- Bowling: Right-arm off break
- Role: All-rounder

International information
- National side: West Indies (1993–1997)
- ODI debut (cap 19): 20 July 1993 v India
- Last ODI: 20 December 1997 v Denmark

Domestic team information
- Years: Team
- 1982–1996: Trinidad and Tobago

Career statistics
Competition	WODI	WFC	WLA
Matches	11	4	18
Runs scored	250	57	375
Batting average	31.25	28.50	34.09
100s/50s	0/2	0/0	0/3
Top score	99*	45	99*
Balls bowled	557	?	557
Wickets	16	5	18
Bowling average	13.31	4.60	12.77
5 wickets in innings	0	0	0
10 wickets in match	0	0	0
Best bowling	3/16	3/17	3/16
Catches/stumpings	3/–	1/–	3/–
- Source: CricketArchive, 13 July 2021

Carol-Ann James is a Trinidadian former cricketer who played as an all-rounder, batting right-handed and bowling right-arm off break. She appeared in 11 One Day Internationals for the West Indies between 1993 and 1997. She played domestic cricket for Trinidad and Tobago.
