= Ann Browne =

West Indian cricketer (born 1955)

Personal information
- Full name: Ann Gertrude Browne
- Born: 29 June 1955 (age 71); Trinidad
- Batting: Right-handed
- Role: Batter
- Relatives: Beverly Browne (sister); Louise Browne (sister)

International information
- National side: West Indies (1993–1997)
- ODI debut (cap 15): 20 July 1993 v India
- Last ODI: 20 December 1997 v Denmark

Domestic team information
- Years: Team
- 1975/76–1994: Trinidad and Tobago

Career statistics
Competition	WODI	WFC	WLA
Matches	11	4	16
Runs scored	204	121	246
Batting average	20.40	40.33	20.50
100s/50s	0/1	0/1	0/1
Top score	65*	80	65*
Balls bowled	–	30	–
Wickets	–	1	–
Bowling average	–	2.00	–
5 wickets in innings	–	0	–
10 wickets in match	–	0	–
Best bowling	–	1/2	–
Catches/stumpings	3/0	1/–	4/–
- Source: CricketArchive, 18 December 2021

Ann Gertrude Browne-John (née Browne; born 28 June 1955) is a Trinidadian former cricketer who played as a right-handed batter. She appeared in 11 One Day Internationals for the West Indies between 1993 and 1997, including captaining the side in nine of those matches. She played domestic cricket for Trinidad and Tobago.

Her sisters Beverly and Louise also played international cricket for the West Indies as well as for Trinidad and Tobago. She was appointed the Lead Selector for the West Indies women's team in 2019.
