= Denmark women's national cricket team =

Denmark
- Flag of Denmark
- Association: Danish Cricket Federation

International Cricket Council
- ICC status: Associate member (1966)
- ICC region: Europe
ICC Rankings	Current	Best-ever
T20I	40th	40th (7 October 2019)

One Day Internationals
- First ODI: Ireland at Nykøbing Mors Cricket Club Ground, Nykøbing Mors; 19 July 1989
- Last ODI: Netherlands at Nykøbing Mors Cricket Club Ground, Nykøbing Mors; 21 July 1999
ODIs	Played	Won/Lost
Total	33	6/27 (0 ties, 0 no results)
- World Cup appearances: 2 (first in 1993)
- Best result: 7th (1993)

T20 Internationals
- First T20I: Sweden at Guttsta Wicked Cricket Ground, Kolsva; 28 May 2022
- Last T20I: Germany at GelsenTrabPark, Gelsenkirchen; 30 August 2026
T20Is	Played	Won/Lost
Total	41	21/20 (0 ties, 0 no results)
This year	15	7/8 (0 ties, 0 no results)
- As of 30 August 2026

The Denmark women's national cricket team represents Denmark in international women's cricket. The team is organised by the Danish Cricket Federation, an associate member of the International Cricket Council (ICC).

Denmark women's first recorded international fixture came against the Netherlands in 1983. The team made its One Day International (ODI) debut in 1989, at the European Championship, and went on to qualify for both the 1993 and 1997 World Cups, winning a single match at each tournament. Denmark played its last ODIs to date in 1999, and has played only in minor regional tournaments since then.

In April 2018, the ICC granted full Women's Twenty20 International (WT20I) status to all its members. Therefore, all Twenty20 matches played between Denmark women and other ICC members after 1 July 2018 will be a full WT20I.

== History ==
Denmark's ODI debut came at the 1989 Women's European Cricket Cup, which they hosted, and placed as runners up in. They were also runners up in the 1991 tournament. They made two appearances in the World Cup, finishing 7th in 1993 and 10th in 1997. Their only ODIs outside the European Championship and World Cup were two series against the Netherlands played at the Mikkelberg-Kunst-und-Cricket Center in Germany in 1997 and 1998. Their most recent ODI was played against Netherlands on 21 July 1999. By this point women's cricket in Denmark was struggling for players with the Danish Cricket Federation reducing the national league to 8 players per side from the 2000 season.

Denmark returned to international competition in August 2013, featuring in a five-team tournament in Bologna (along with Estonia, Gibraltar, Italy, and Belgium). They finished runner-up to Italy, winning three out of four matches. In August 2014, Denmark played an international 20-over tournament in Berlin, with six other European teams. They won only two of their six matches (defeating Gibraltar and Belgium by nine wickets each), consequently finishing the tournament in fifth place, behind Italy, Germany, France, and Jersey.

In August 2024, Denmark went unbeaten to win the 2024 Women's T20I Nordic Cup with victories over Guernsey, hosts Norway, Estonia and a Finland XI.

== Tournament history ==
=== World Cup ===
- 1973–1988: Did not participate
- 1993: 7th place
- 1997: 10th place
- 2000–present: Did not participate

=== European Championship ===
- 1989: Runners up
- 1990: 4th place
- 1991: Runners up
- 1995: 4th place
- 1999: 3rd place
- 2001: Did not participate
- 2005: Did not participate

== Records and statistics ==
International Match Summary — Denmark Women

Last updated 30 August 2026

Playing Record
Format	M	W	L	T	NR	Inaugural Match
One-Day Internationals	33	6	27	0	0	19 July 1989
Twenty20 Internationals	41	21	20	0	0	28 May 2022

=== One-Day International ===
- Highest team total: 185/8 (55.0 Overs) v Ireland, 18 July 1990 at Leicester Ivanhoe Cricket Club Ground, Kirby Muxloe.
- Highest individual innings: 53, Janni Jonsson v Ireland, 18 July 1995 at Railway Union Sports Club, Dublin.
- Best innings bowling: 4/6, Mette Gregersen v The Netherlands, 21 July 1999 at Nykøbing Mors Cricket Club Ground, Nykobing Mors.

Most ODI runs for Denmark Women

Player	Runs	Average	Career span
Janni Jonsson	388	12.93	1989-1999
Karin Mikkelsen	297	17.47	1993-1999
Mette Frost	295	14.04	1990-1999
Vibeke Nielsen	275	11.00	1989-1999
Trine Christiansen	253	10.54	1989-1997

Most ODI wickets for Denmark Women

Player	Wickets	Average	Career span
Janni Jonsson	35	24.77	1989-1999
Susanne Nielsen	32	27.56	1989-1999
Mette Gregersen	14	19.07	1990-1999
Marlene Slebsager	12	42.66	1989-1999
Lene Hansen	12	23.25	1989-1991

ODI record versus other nations

Records complete to Women ODI #306. Last updated 21 July 1999.

Opponent	M	W	L	T	NR	First match	First win
Australia	2	0	2	0	0	28 July 1993	
England	8	0	8	0	0	20 July 1989	
India	1	0	1	0	0	29 July 1993	
Ireland	7	1	6	0	0	19 July 1989	17 July 1991
Netherlands	10	4	6	0	0	21 July 1989	21 July 1989
New Zealand	1	0	1	0	0	24 July 1993	
Pakistan	1	1	0	0	0	10 December 1997	10 December 1997
South Africa	1	0	1	0	0	18 December 1997	
West Indies	2	0	2	0	0	25 July 1993	

=== Twenty20 International ===
T20I record versus other nations

Records complete to WT20I #2985. Last updated 30 August 2026.

Opponent	M	W	L	T	NR	First match	First win
ICC Associate members
Austria	5	3	2	0	0	4 May 2024	5 May 2024
Cyprus	2	2	0	0	0	19 April 2025	19 April 2025
Estonia	1	1	0	0	0	11 August 2024	11 August 2024
Finland	1	1	0	0	0	30 August 2025	30 August 2025
Germany	3	1	2	0	0	31 August 2025	29 August 2026
Greece	4	3	1	0	0	9 May 2026	9 May 2026
Guernsey	1	1	0	0	0	10 August 2024	10 August 2024
Isle of Man	2	1	1	0	0	18 April 2025	19 April 2025
Jersey	2	0	2	0	0	18 April 2025	
Luxembourg	1	1	0	0	0	15 September 2024	15 September 2024
Norway	5	4	1	0	0	28 May 2022	25 August 2023
Oman	4	0	4	0	0	3 February 2026	
Sweden	6	0	6	0	0	28 May 2022	
Switzerland	4	3	1	0	0	27 June 2026	27 June 2026

== See also ==
- List of Denmark women ODI cricketers
- List of Denmark women Twenty20 International cricketers
- Denmark national cricket team
