= New Zealand women's cricket team in England and Ireland in 1996 =

New Zealand women's cricket team in England in 1996
	England	New Zealand
- Dates: 8 June – 15 July 1996
Captains	Karen Smithies	Sarah Illingworth

Test series
- Result: 3-match series drawn 0–0
Most runs	Barbara Daniels (99)	Debbie Hockley (246)
Most wickets	Karen Smithies (5)	Katrina Keenan (6)

One Day International series
- Results: New Zealand won the 3-match series 3–0
Most runs	Kathryn Leng (207)	Kirsty Flavell (340)
Most wickets	Kathryn Leng (7)	Catherine Campbell (9)

The New Zealand women's national cricket team toured England and Ireland in June and July 1996. They first played England in 3 One Day Internationals, winning the series 3–0. They then played England in three Test matches, all of which were drawn. Finally, they played Ireland in 3 ODIs, winning the series 2–0.

== Tour of England ==
=== Squads ===
England	New Zealand
Karen Smithies (c); Jan Brittin; Sarah-Jane Cook; Barbara Daniels; Charlotte Edwards; Janet Godman; Nicola Holt; Kathryn Leng; Ruth Lupton; Sue Metcalfe; Bev Nicholson; Lucy Pearson; Helen Plimmer; Melissa Reynard; Jane Smit (wk); Debra Stock; Clare Taylor	Sarah Illingworth (c) (wk); Kelly Brown; Catherine Campbell; Helen Daly; Emily Drumm; Kirsty Flavell; Shelley Fruin; Justine Fryer; Julie Harris; Debbie Hockley; Katrina Keenan; Karen Le Comber; Maia Lewis; Clare Nicholson; Anna Smith

=== Tour Matches ===
==== 50-over match: AT Collins' XI v New Zealand ====
8 June 1996
Scorecard

New Zealand; 243 (48.3 overs)	v	AT Collins' XI; 118/8 (50 overs)
Kirsty Flavell 59 (42); Karen Smithies 4/28 (9 overs)		Charlotte Edwards 46 (86); Helen Daly 3/36 (10 overs)

New Zealand Women won by 125 runs
Denis Compton Oval, Shenley
Umpires: John Favager (Eng) and Janet Rogers (Eng)

- AT Collins' XI won the toss and elected to field.

==== 50-over match: South of England v New Zealand ====
9 June 1996
Scorecard

South of England; 95 (47.1 overs)	v	New Zealand; 96/1 (13.2 overs)
Ruth Lupton 36 (83); Catherine Campbell 2/12 (9 overs)		Debbie Hockley 56* (38); Debra Stock 1/21 (3 overs)

New Zealand Women won by 9 wickets
Arundel Castle Cricket Ground, Arundel
Umpires: David Fardell (Eng) and Alan Fox (Eng)

- South of England Women won the toss and elected to bat.

==== 50-over match: England Under-21s v New Zealand ====
11 June 1996
Scorecard

New Zealand; 259/5 (50 overs)	v	England Under-21s; 99/7 (50 overs)
Kirsty Flavell 59 (59); Sarah Collyer 1/16 (2 overs)		Ella Donnison 40 (135); Helen Daly 2/14 (10 overs)

New Zealand Women won by 160 runs
Nevill Ground, Royal Tunbridge Wells
Umpires: David Bryant (Eng) and Valerie Gibbens (Eng)

- England Under-21s Women won the toss and elected to field.

==== 3-day match: North of England v New Zealand ====
20 – 22 June 1996
Scorecard

New Zealand	v	North of England
328/8d (93.1 overs); Anna Smith 70 (161); Janet Tedstone 2/53 (17 overs)		155 (98.5 overs); Wendy Watson 65 (227); Kelly Brown 3/25 (17.5 overs)
		131 (127 overs) (f/o); Wendy Watson 29 (98); Justine Fryer 5/37 (40 overs)

New Zealand Women won by an innings and 42 runs
Longhirst Hall Ground, Longhirst
Umpires: Alan Heath (Eng) and Sally Marshall (Eng)

- New Zealand Women won the toss and elected to bat.

==== 3-day match: Women's Cricket Association President's XI v New Zealand ====
29 – 30 June 1996
Scorecard

Women's Cricket Association President's XI	v	New Zealand
208 (80.1 overs); Janet Godman 101 (183); Clare Nicholson 3/37 (17 overs)		192/2d (64.2 overs); Anna Smith 105 (222); Sue Redfern 1/26 (9 overs)
98 (58.3 overs); Charlotte Edwards 35 (83); Catherine Campbell 4/27 (16 overs)		118/5 (26 overs); Karen Le Comber 52 (49); Helen Clarke 1/6 (2 overs)

New Zealand Women won by 5 wickets
Malvern College Ground, Malvern
Umpires: David Fardell (Eng) and Janet Rogers (Eng)

- Women's Cricket Association President's XI won the toss and elected to bat.

==== 3-day match: Midwest England v New Zealand ====
29 – 30 June 1996
Scorecard

Midwest England	v	New Zealand
198 (97 overs); Debra Stock 42 (126); Julie Harris 3/19 (20 overs)		300/7d (109 overs); Karen Le Comber 62 (128); Kelly Evenson 3/41 (19 overs)
139/2 (92 overs); Elizabeth Whelan 68* (284); Helen Daly 1/20 (10 overs)

Match drawn
Christ Church Ground, Oxford
Umpires: David Bryant (Eng) and John Favager (Eng)

- New Zealand Women won the toss and elected to field.

=== WODI Series ===
==== 1st ODI ====
13 June 1996
Scorecard

England; 139/6 (50 overs)	v	New Zealand; 140/2 (33.3 overs)
Jane Smit 25* (56); Kelly Brown 1/14 (8 overs)		Debbie Hockley 54 (59); Melissa Reynard 1/22 (7.3 overs)

New Zealand Women won by 8 wickets
Lord's, London
Umpires: Ann Roberts (Eng) and Kathy Taylor (Eng)
Player of the match: Debbie Hockley (NZ)

- England Women won the toss and elected to bat.
- Kelly Brown and Karen Le Comber (NZ) both made their WODI debuts.

==== 2nd ODI ====
16 June 1996
Scorecard

New Zealand; 201/9 (50 overs)	v	England; 145 (42.1 overs)
Debbie Hockley 75 (95); Melissa Reynard 3/41 (10 overs)		Debra Stock 46 (58); Katrina Keenan 3/17 (7.1 overs)

New Zealand Women won by 56 runs
Grace Road, Leicester
Umpires: John Favager (Eng) and John Hayes (Eng)
Player of the match: Debbie Hockley (NZ)

- New Zealand Women won the toss and elected to bat.
- Nicola Holt (Eng) made her WODI debut.

==== 3rd ODI ====
18 June 1996
Scorecard

New Zealand; 237/7 (50 overs)	v	England; 212 (49.3 overs)
Debbie Hockley 117 (136); Karen Smithies 3/40 (10 overs)		Barbara Daniels 66 (70); Katrina Keenan 3/45 (10 overs)

New Zealand Women won by 25 runs
Riverside Ground, Chester-le-Street
Umpires: Alan Heath (Eng) and Sally Marshall (Eng)
Player of the match: Debbie Hockley (NZ)

- England Women won the toss and elected to field.
- Bev Nicholson (Eng) made her WODI debut.

=== WTest Series ===
==== 1st Test ====
24 – 27 June 1996
Scorecard

England	v	New Zealand
414 (140.5 overs); Barbara Daniels 160 (268); Catherine Campbell 4/94 (34.5 overs)		517 (215 overs); Kirsty Flavell 204 (504); Kathryn Leng 3/112 (46 overs)

Match drawn
North Marine Road Ground, Scarborough
Umpires: Ann Roberts (Eng) and John Hayes (Eng)
Player of the match: Kirsty Flavell (NZ)

- England Women won the toss and elected to bat.
- Sarah-Jane Cook, Ruth Lupton, (Eng), Kelly Brown and Helen Daly (NZ) all made their WTest debuts.

==== 2nd Test ====
4 – 7 July 1996
Scorecard

England	v	New Zealand
276 (138.3 overs); Jane Smit 69 (274); Katrina Keenan 6/73 (40.3 overs)		296/6d (116 overs); Debbie Hockley 115 (259); Clare Taylor 2/64 (32 overs)

Match drawn
County Ground, Worcester
Umpires: Alan Fox (Eng) and Valerie Gibbens (Eng)

- England Women won the toss and elected to bat.
- Anna Smith (NZ) made her WTest debut.

==== 3rd Test ====
12 – 15 July 1996
Scorecard

New Zealand	v	England
362/5d (100 overs); Kirsty Flavell 97 (132); Barbara Daniels 1/30 (3 overs)		271 (123.3 overs); Jan Brittin 57 (156); Justine Fryer 4/37 (13 overs)
219/4d (71 overs); Emily Drumm 112* (186); Kathryn Leng 2/26 (10 overs)		225/8 (106 overs); Sue Metcalfe 63 (199); Catherine Campbell 3/86 (32 overs)

Match drawn
Woodbridge Road, Guildford
Umpires: Kathy Taylor (Eng) and Valerie Gibbens (Eng)

- New Zealand Women won the toss and elected to bat.
- Charlotte Edwards and Lucy Pearson (Eng) both made their WTest debuts.

== Tour of Ireland ==
New Zealand women's cricket team in Ireland in 1996
	Ireland	New Zealand
- Dates: 18 – 21 July 1996
Captains	Miriam Grealey	Sarah Illingworth

One Day International series
- Results: New Zealand won the 3-match series 2–0
Most runs	Anne Linehan (35)	Karen Le Comber (265)
Most wickets	Judith Herbison (3)	Julie Harris (4)

=== Squads ===
Ireland	New Zealand
Miriam Grealey (c); Susan Bray; Judith Herbison; Anne Linehan; Julie Logue (wk); Barbara McDonald; Mary-Pat Moore; Clare O'Leary; Catherine O'Neill; Shona Seawright; Adele Spence; Nikki Squire; Saibh Young	Sarah Illingworth (c) (wk); Kelly Brown; Catherine Campbell; Helen Daly; Emily Drumm; Kirsty Flavell; Shelley Fruin; Justine Fryer; Julie Harris; Debbie Hockley; Katrina Keenan; Karen Le Comber; Maia Lewis; Clare Nicholson; Anna Smith

=== WODI Series ===
==== 1st ODI ====
18 July 1996
Scorecard

New Zealand; 208/7 (50 overs)	v	Ireland; 111 (45.4 overs)
Karen Le Comber 62 (76); Miriam Grealey 2/32 (7 overs)		Julie Logue 22* (49); Julie Harris 3/10 (8.4 overs)

New Zealand Women won by 97 runs
Castle Avenue, Dublin
Umpires: Alan Tuffery (Ire) and Leslie Hewson (Ire)
Player of the match: Karen Le Comber (NZ)

- New Zealand Women won the toss and elected to bat.
- Clare O'Leary (Ire) made her WODI debut.

==== 2nd ODI ====
19 July 1996
Scorecard

New Zealand; 270/2 (50 overs)	v	Ireland; 127/6 (50 overs)
Karen Le Comber 135* (145); Mary-Pat Moore 1/29 (6 overs)		Nikki Squire 30 (63); Emily Drumm 2/12 (5 overs)

New Zealand Women won by 143 runs
Pembroke Cricket Club, Dublin
Umpires: Liam Keegan (Ire) and Ronnie O'Reilly (Ire)
Player of the match: Emily Drumm (NZ)

- Ireland Women won the toss and elected to field.

==== 3rd ODI ====
21 July 1996
Scorecard

New Zealand; 138/2 (31 overs)	v	Ireland
Karen Le Comber 68* (97); Judith Herbison 2/32 (10 overs)

No result
Carlisle Cricket Club Ground, Dublin
Umpires: Liam Keegan (Ire) and Stu Daultrey (Ire)

- Ireland Women won the toss and elected to field.
- Adele Spence (Ire) made her WODI debut.
