= Australia women's cricket team in England and Ireland in 2001 =

Sports team tour

Australian women's cricket team in England in 2001
	England	Australia
- Dates: 18 June – 8 July 2001
Captains	Clare Connor	Belinda Clark

Test series
- Result: Australia won the 2-match series 2–0
Most runs	Claire Taylor (159)	Karen Rolton (218)
Most wickets	Clare Connor (5)	Cathryn Fitzpatrick (17)

One Day International series
- Results: Australia won the 3-match series 3–0
Most runs	Claire Taylor (97)	Karen Rolton (176)
Most wickets	Clare Connor (6)	Terry McGregor (8)

The Australian women's cricket team toured England and Ireland in June and July 2001. The matches against England women's cricket team were played for the Women's Ashes, which Australia were defending. Australia won all three ODIs and both Test matches, meaning they retained the Ashes. After their tour of England, Australia played three ODIs against Ireland, defeating them 3–0.

== Tour of England ==
=== Squads ===
England	Australia
Clare Connor (c); Caroline Atkins; Jane Cassar (wk); Sarah Collyer; Charlotte Edwards; Laura Harper; Jackie Hawker; Dawn Holden; Hannah Lloyd; Kate Lowe; Lucy Pearson; Nicky Shaw; Clare Taylor; Claire Taylor; Arran Thompson	Belinda Clark (c); Louise Broadfoot; Sally Cooper; Avril Fahey; Cathryn Fitzpatrick; Michelle Goszko; Julie Hayes; Lisa Keightley; Terry McGregor; Olivia Magno; Charmaine Mason; Julia Price (wk); Karen Rolton; Lisa Sthalekar

=== Tour matches ===
==== 50-over match: Marylebone Cricket Club v Australia ====
18 June 2001
Scorecard

Australia; 251/9 (50 overs)	v	Marylebone Cricket Club; 109 (44.4 overs)
Louise Broadfoot 51 (–); Gill Richards 2/38 (10 overs)		Haidee Tiffen 34 (–); Olivia Magno 6/34 (10 overs)

Australia Women won by 142 runs
John Walker's Ground, Southgate
Umpires: Valerie Gibbens (Eng) and John Hayes (Eng)

- Australia Women won the toss and elected to bat.

==== 50-over match: England Development Squad v Australia ====
19 June 2001
Scorecard

Australia; 257/7 (50 overs)	v	England Development Squad; 87 (48.4 overs)
Karen Rolton 56* (51); Kathryn Leng 2/32 (9 overs)		Hannah Lloyd 29 (74); Charmaine Mason 4/22 (9.4 overs)

Australia Women won by 170 runs
John Walker's Ground, Southgate
Umpires: Alan Fox (Eng) and Judith West (Eng)

- England Development Squad Women won the toss and elected to field.

==== 50-over match: England Development Squad v Australia ====
21 June 2001
Scorecard

Australia; 255/8 (50 overs)	v	England Development Squad; 167/9 (50 overs)
Karen Rolton 69 (56); Sarah Clarke 2/46 (8 overs)		Sarah Clarke 43 (43); Cathryn Fitzpatrick 3/39 (10 overs)

Australia Women won by 88 runs
Brunton Memorial Ground, Radlett
Umpires: Lorraine Elgar (Eng) and Benita White (Eng)

- Australia Women won the toss and elected to bat.

=== Test series ===
==== 1st Test ====
24 – 26 June 2001
Scorecard

England	v	Australia
103 (83.1 overs); Kate Lowe 23 (66); Cathryn Fitzpatrick 5/29 (18.1 overs)		344 (115.1 overs); Michelle Goszko 204 (345); Clare Connor 5/65 (28 overs)
101 (61 overs); Laura Harper 20 (60); Olivia Magno 3/16 (13 overs)

Australia Women won by an innings and 140 runs
Denis Compton Oval, Shenley
Umpires: Lorraine Elgar (Eng) and Neil Mallender (Eng)
Player of the match: Michelle Goszko (Aus)

- England Women won the toss and elected to bat.
- Arran Thompson, Caroline Atkins, Dawn Holden, Kate Lowe, Laura Harper, Nicky Shaw (Eng), Louise Broadfoot, Michelle Goszko and Terry McGregor (Aus) all made their WTest debuts.

==== 2nd Test ====
6 – 8 July 2001
Scorecard

England	v	Australia
144 (80.5 overs); Sarah Collyer 37 (142); Cathryn Fitzpatrick 5/31 (22.5 overs)		383/4d (112 overs); Karen Rolton 209* (313); Clare Taylor 2/87 (29 overs)
245 (112 overs); Claire Taylor 137 (232); Charmaine Mason 4/66 (34 overs)		9/1 (3.1 overs); Karen Rolton 9* Clare Taylor 1/5 (2 overs)

Australia Women won by 9 wickets
Headingley Cricket Ground, Leeds
Umpires: Alan Whitehead (Eng) and Ann Roberts (Eng)
Player of the match: Karen Rolton (Aus)

- Australia Women won the toss and elected to field.
- Julie Hayes (Aus) made her WTest debut.

=== WODI Series ===
==== 1st ODI ====
29 June 2001
Scorecard

Australia; 238/7 (50 overs)	v	England; 139 (47.5 overs)
Karen Rolton 79 (68); Clare Connor 2/33 (10 overs)		Claire Taylor 39 (88); Terry McGregor 4/15 (10 overs)

Australia Women won by 99 runs
County Ground, Derby
Umpires: John Hayes (Eng) and Paul Adams (Eng)
Player of the match: Karen Rolton (Aus)

- England Women won the toss and elected to field.
- Lisa Sthalekar (Aus) made her WODI debut.

==== 2nd ODI ====
2 July 2001
Scorecard

Australia; 238/7 (50 overs)	v	England; 109 (47.3 overs)
Belinda Clark 69 (110); Dawn Holden 3/48 (10 overs)		Sarah Collyer 26 (74); Karen Rolton 3/14 (8 overs)

Australia Women won by 118 runs
County Ground, Northampton
Umpires: Kathy Taylor (Eng) and Kevin Lyons (Eng)
Player of the match: Karen Rolton (Aus)

- Australia Women won the toss and elected to bat.
- Sally Cooper (Aus) made her WODI debut.

==== 3rd ODI ====
3 July 2001
Scorecard

Australia; 206/7 (50 overs)	v	England; 140/8 (50 overs)
Lisa Keightley 54 (92); Sarah Collyer 2/30 (10 overs)		Claire Taylor 50* (77); Terry McGregor 2/14 (10 overs)

Australia Women won by 66 runs
Lord's, London
Umpires: John West (Eng) and Nigel Llong (Eng)
Player of the match: Terry McGregor (Aus)

- Australia Women won the toss and elected to bat.
- Caroline Atkins (Eng) made her WODI debut.

== Tour of Ireland ==
Australian women's cricket team in Ireland in 2001
	Ireland	Australia
- Dates: 12 – 15 July 2001
Captains	Nikki Squire	Belinda Clark

One Day International series
- Results: Australia won the 3-match series 3–0
Most runs	Clare O'Leary (72)	Belinda Clark (96)
Most wickets	Saibh Young (4)	Cathryn Fitzpatrick (8)

=== Squads ===
Ireland	Australia
Nikki Squire (c); Caitriona Beggs; Aoife Budd; Miriam Grealey; Isobel Joyce; Cecelia Joyce; Grainne Leahy; Anne Linehan (wk); Barbara McDonald; Ciara Metcalfe; Lara Molins; Clare O'Leary; Clare Shillington; Saibh Young	Belinda Clark (c); Louise Broadfoot; Sally Cooper; Avril Fahey; Cathryn Fitzpatrick; Michelle Goszko; Julie Hayes; Lisa Keightley; Terry McGregor; Olivia Magno; Charmaine Mason; Julia Price (wk); Karen Rolton; Lisa Sthalekar

=== WODI Series ===
==== 1st ODI ====
12 July 2001
Scorecard

Ireland; 132 (49.1 overs)	v	Australia; 119/5 (36.4 overs)
Caitriona Beggs 45 (–); Terry McGregor 3/21 (10 overs)		Michelle Goszko 36* (–); Barbara McDonald 1/15 (10 overs)

Australia Women won by 5 wickets (D/L)
Observatory Lane, Rathmines, Dublin
Umpires: Ray Cutland (Ire) and M McIlroy (Ire)

- Ireland Women won the toss and elected to bat.
- Reduced target of 117, due to rain in 2nd innings.

==== 2nd ODI ====
14 July 2001
Scorecard

Ireland; 119/7 (50 overs)	v	Australia; 120/1 (27.4 overs)
Miriam Grealey 57 (89); Cathryn Fitzpatrick 5/14 (10 overs)		Karen Rolton 51* (34); Saibh Young 1/15 (4 overs)

Australia Women won by 9 wickets
College Park, Dublin
Umpires: Leslie Hewson (Ire) and M McIlroy (Ire)

- Ireland Women won the toss and elected to bat.
- Cecelia Joyce (Ire) made her WODI debut.

==== 3rd ODI ====
15 July 2001
Scorecard

Australia; 247/9 (50 overs)	v	Ireland; 46 (23 overs)
Sally Cooper 85 (119); Ciara Metcalfe 3/43 (10 overs)		Nikki Squire 11* (39); Terry McGregor 4/8 (6 overs)

Australia Women won by 201 runs
College Park, Dublin
Umpires: David Walsh (Ire) and Desmond Watson (Ire)

- Australia Women won the toss and elected to bat.
