= 1995 Women's European Cricket Cup =

- Dates: 18 – 22 July 1995
- Cricket format: ODI (50-over)
- Tournament format(s): Round-robin, final
- Host: Ireland
- Champions: England (4th title)
- Participants: 4
- Matches: 7
- Most runs: (Ireland) Mary-Pat Moore (175)
- Most wickets: (England) Kathryn Leng (8)

The 1995 Women's European Cricket Cup was an international cricket tournament held in Ireland from 18 to 22 July 1995. It was the fourth edition of the Women's European Championship, and all matches at the tournament held One Day International (ODI) status.

Four teams participated, with the hosts, Ireland, joined by the three other European members of the International Women's Cricket Council (IWCC) – Denmark, England, and the Netherlands. A round-robin format was used, with the top two teams proceeding to the final. England was undefeated in the round-robin stage and beat Ireland by seven wickets in the final, winning the championship for the fourth time in a row. Ireland's Mary-Pat Moore led the tournament in runs (and scored the only century, against Denmark), and England's Kathryn Leng was the leading wicket-taker. All matches at the tournament were played in Dublin, with five venues being used for the seven matches played.

== Squads ==
| Denmark Coach: Erik Juul | England Coach: John Bown | Ireland Coach: Brendan O'Brien | Netherlands Coach: Tony Opatha |
|---|---|---|---|
| Janni Jønsson (c); Dorte Christensen; Dorte Christiansen; Mette Frost; Mette Gregersen; Henriette Hansen; Malene Iversen; Pernille Jønsson; Susanne Nielsen; Vibeke Nielsen; Jette Philipsen; Lene Slebsager; Pia Thomsen | Karen Smithies (c); Clare Connor; Barbara Daniels; Kathryn Leng; Ruth Lupton; Debra Maybury; Helen Plimmer; Sue Redfern; Melissa Reynard; Jane Smit; Debra Stock; Clare Taylor; Claire Whichcord | Miriam Grealey (c); Judith Herbison (vc); Caitriona Beggs; Susan Bray; Sandra Dawson; Anne Linehan; Julie Logue; Mary-Pat Moore; Catherine O'Neill; Elizabeth Owens; Shona Seawright; Nikki Squire; Saibh Young | Edmee Janss (c); Angela Batenberg-Venturini; Caroline de Fouw; Wendy Gerritsen; Marieke Hommels; Jiska Howard; Maartje Köster; Sandra Kottman; Annette Kroon; Cheraldine Oudolf; Nicola Payne; Carolien Salomons; Pauline te Beest; Jet van Noortwijk |

== Round-robin ==
=== Points table ===
| Team | Pld | W | L | T | NR | Pts | RR |
|---|---|---|---|---|---|---|---|
| England | 3 | 3 | 0 | 0 | 0 | 6 | 3.950 |
| Ireland | 3 | 2 | 1 | 0 | 0 | 4 | 3.842 |
| Netherlands | 3 | 1 | 2 | 0 | 0 | 2 | 2.473 |
| Denmark | 3 | 0 | 3 | 0 | 0 | 0 | 2.634 |

Source: CricketArchive

=== Fixtures ===
18 July
Scorecard

| England; 219/5 (50 overs) | v | Netherlands; 99/6 (50 overs) |

England won by 120 runs
College Park, Dublin
Player of the match: Jane Smit (Eng)

- Netherlands won the toss and elected to bowl.

18 July
Scorecard

| Ireland; 238/2 (50 overs) | v | Denmark; 166/9 (50 overs) |

Ireland won by 72 runs
Park Avenue, Dublin
Player of the match: Mary-Pat Moore (Ire)

- Denmark won the toss and elected to bowl.
- Ireland's Mary-Pat Moore scored 114 not out, the first ODI century for Ireland. It remained the highest ODI score for Ireland until July 2000, when Karen Young scored 120 against Pakistan.

19 July
Scorecard

| England; 205/6 (50 overs) | v | Denmark; 72 (37.5 overs) |

England won by 133 runs
Observatory Lane, Dublin
Player of the match: Kathryn Leng (Eng)

- England won the toss and elected to bat.

19 July
Scorecard

| Netherlands; 141/5 (50 overs) | v | Ireland; 142/2 (39.3 overs) |

Ireland won by 8 wickets
Sydney Parade, Dublin
Player of the match: Mary-Pat Moore (Ire)

- Netherlands won the toss and elected to bat.

20 July
Scorecard

| Denmark; 125/9 (50 overs) | v | Netherlands; 126/4 (48 overs) |

Netherlands won by 6 wickets
Park Avenue, Dublin
Player of the match: Dorte Christiansen (Den)

- Netherlands won the toss and elected to bowl.

20 July
Scorecard

| Ireland; 156/8 (50 overs) | v | England; 154/6 (46.2 overs) |

England won by 4 wickets
College Park, Dublin
Player of the match: Kathryn Leng

- Ireland won the toss and elected to bat.
- The match was interrupted by rain – England's target was 153 runs in 49 overs.

== Final ==
22 July
Scorecard

| Ireland; 150/8 (50 overs) | v | England; 153/3 (40.3 overs) |
| Miriam Grealey 46 (77); Melissa Reynard 2/26 (7 overs) | | Barbara Daniels 47 (48); Miriam Grealey 1/19 (3.3 overs) |

England won by 7 wickets
Castle Avenue, Dublin

- England won the toss and elected to bat.

== Statistics ==
=== Most runs ===
The top five run scorers (total runs) are included in this table.

| Player | Team | Runs | Inns | Avg | Highest | 100s | 50s |
|---|---|---|---|---|---|---|---|
| Mary-Pat Moore | Ireland | 175 | 4 | 58.33 | 114* | 1 | 1 |
| Anne Linehan | Ireland | 141 | 4 | 35.25 | 74 | 0 | 2 |
| Jane Smit | England | 138 | 4 | 46.00 | 91 | 0 | 1 |
| Barbara Daniels | England | 114 | 4 | 28.50 | 47 | 0 | 0 |
| Kathryn Leng | England | 113 | 3 | 113.00 | 44 | 0 | 0 |

Source: CricketArchive

=== Most wickets ===
The top five wicket takers are listed in this table, listed by wickets taken and then by bowling average.

| Player | Team | Overs | Wkts | Ave | SR | Econ | BBI |
|---|---|---|---|---|---|---|---|
| Kathryn Leng | England | 32.0 | 8 | 12.00 | 24.00 | 3.00 | 4/31 |
| Karen Smithies | England | 22.0 | 5 | 13.00 | 26.40 | 2.95 | 3/23 |
| Elizabeth Owens | Ireland | 33.0 | 5 | 27.40 | 39.60 | 4.15 | 2/22 |
| Debra Stock | England | 28.0 | 4 | 13.00 | 42.00 | 1.85 | 2/2 |
| Dorte Christiansen | Denmark | 20.0 | 4 | 20.50 | 30.00 | 4.10 | 3/22 |

Source: CricketArchive
