= Irish Cricket Awards =

Cricket awards in Ireland

The Irish Cricket Awards (also known as Cricket Ireland Awards) are a set of annual cricket awards given by Cricket Ireland. The awards recognise and honour the best of Irish coaches, match officials, volunteers, clubs and players at all levels of the game over the previous calendar year.

== History ==
The Cricket Writers of Ireland Association was formed in 2008, and started Cricket Writers of Ireland Awards in the same year. Later, it became discontinue except Irish Cricket Hall of Fame which subsequently became part of Irish Cricket Awards. It was launched by Cricket Ireland in 2012, with RSA Insurance Group Limited as its title sponsor.

Paul Stirling won the first ever Men's International Player of the Year Award in 2012, and went on to win it four more times in 2017, 2020, 2021, 2022 which is the most by any player. Apart from Stirling, only Ed Joyce (2013, 2015, 2016) has won the award more than once. In the same category in women's cricket, Clare Shillington won the first ever Women's International Player of the Year. And, Gaby Lewis (2017, 2022) being the only player to have won it more than once.

The Players of the Decade award was introduced in 2021. Paul Stirling and Kim Garth were announced as the Men's and Women's Player of the decade respectively.

== List of winners ==
=== 2012 ===
- Men's International Player of the Year: Paul Stirling.
- Women's International Player of the Year: Clare Shillington
- International Emerging Player of the Year: Stuart Thompson
- Junior Player of the Year: Tyrone Kane
- Club Player of the Year: Johnny Thompson
- Coach of the Year: John Wills
- Volunteer of the Year: Aideen Rice
- Club of the Year: Donemana CC

=== 2013 ===
- Men's International Player of the Year: Ed Joyce.
- Women's International Player of the Year: Isobel Joyce.
- International Emerging Player of the Year: John Anderson
- Junior Player of the Year: Fiachra Tucker
- Club Player of the Year: Eddie Richardson
- Coach of the Year: Kamal Merchant
- Official of the Year: Mark Hawthorne
- Club of the Year: Clontarf CC
- Volunteer of the Year: Ian Talbot
- Outstanding contribution to Irish Cricket: Mary Sharp

=== 2014 ===
- Men's International Player of the Year: Kevin O'Brien.
- Women's International Player of the Year: Cecelia Joyce
- International Emerging Player of the Year: Craig Young
- Junior Player of the Year: James McCollum
- Academy Player of the Year: Peter Chase
- Inter-Provincial Series Player of the Year: Andrew Poynter
- Club Player of the Year: Dekker Curry
- Official of the Year: Mark Hawthorne
- Coach of the Year: Simon Johnston
- Club of the Year: Carrickfergus CC
- Volunteer of the Year: Lawrence Moore
- Outstanding Contribution to Irish Cricket: David Williams

=== 2015 ===
- Men's International Player of the Year: Ed Joyce
- Women's International Player of the Year: Kim Garth
- International Emerging Player of the Year: Gaby Lewis.
- Junior Player of the Year: Varun Chopra
- Academy Player of the Year: Jack Tector
- Inter-Provincial Series Player of the Year: John Mooney
- Club Player of the Year: Eddie Richardson.
- Coach of the Year: Simon Johnston
- Official of the Year: Roland Black
- Club of the Year: Waringstown CC
- Volunteer of the Year: Brian O’Sullivan
- Outstanding Contribution to Irish Cricket: Jim Bennett

=== 2016 ===
- Men's International Player of the Year: Ed Joyce.
- Women's International Player of the Year: Ciara Metcalfe.
- International Emerging Player of the Year: Barry McCarthy
- Junior Player of the Year: Lorcan Tucker
- Academy Player of the Year: Josh Little
- Inter-Provincial Series Player of the Year: John Anderson
- Super 3s Player of the Year: Eimear Richardson
- Club Player of the Year: John Anderson
- Coach of the Year: Rob O’Connor.
- Official of the Year: Paul Reynolds
- Club of the Year: Cork County CC
- Volunteer of the Year: Herbie Honohan
- Outstanding Contribution to Irish Cricket: Eddie Lewis

=== 2017 ===
- Men’s International Player of the Year: Paul Stirling.
- Women’s International Player of the Year: Gaby Lewis
- International Emerging Player of the Year: Jacob Mulder
- Men's Youth International Player of the Year: Harry Tector
- Women's Youth International Player of the Year: Gaby Lewis
- Club Player of the Year: Nigel Jones
- Men's Academy Player of the Year: Simi Singh
- Women's Academy Player of the Year: Lara Maritz
- Inter-Provincial Series Player of the Year: James Shannon
- Super 3s Player of the Year: Laura Delany
- Coach of the Year: Ryan Eagleson
- Official of the Year: Andrew Mooney
- Volunteer of the Year: David Ramsey
- Groundsman of the Year: Dale McDonough
- Club of the Year: Waringstown CC
- Outstanding Contribution to Irish Cricket: Barry Chambers

=== 2018 ===
- Men’s International Player of the Year: Tim Murtagh.
- Women’s International Player of the Year: Laura Delany.
- International Emerging Player of the Year: Una Raymond-Hoey
- Men's Youth International Player of the Year: Tim Tector
- Women's Youth International Player of the Year: Leah Paul
- Men's Club Player of the Year: John Anderson
- Women's Club Player of the Year: Isobel Joyce
- Inter-Provincial Series Player of the Year: George Dockrell
- Super 3s Player of the Year: Lara Maritz
- Groundsman of the Year: Philip McCormick
- Volunteer of the Year: Harry Rutherford, Bready Cricket Club
- Men's Academy Player of the Year: Harry Tector
- Women's Academy Player of the Year: Rebecca Stokell
- Club Cricket Official of the Year: Mary Waldron
- Club of the Year: Waringstown CC
- Emerging Club of the Year: Adamstown CC
- Contribution to Irish Coaching: Stephen Dyer
- Outstanding Contribution to Irish Cricket: Murray Power

=== 2020 ===
- Men’s International Player of the Year: Paul Stirling.
- Women’s International Player of the Year: Eimear Richardson
- Men's Youth International Player of the Year: Nathan McGuire
- Women's Youth International Player of the Year: Orla Prendergast
- Inter-Provincial Series Player of the Year: Harry Tector
- Super 3s Player of the Year: Leah Paul
- Volunteering Excellence Award: Robert McGonigle
- Club Cricket Official of the Year: Joe Connolly
- Men's Club Player of the Year: Andrew Britton
- Women's Club Player of the Year: Alison Cowan
- Club of the Year: Pembroke CC
- Outstanding Contribution to Coaching: Andy McCrea
- Outstanding Contribution to Irish Cricket: Joe Doherty

=== 2021 ===
- Men’s International Player of the Decade: Paul Stirling.
- Women’s International Player of the Decade: Kim Garth.
- Men’s International Player of the Year: Paul Stirling
- Men’s Club Player of the Year: John Anderson
- Women’s Club Player of the Year: Alana Dalzell
- Emerging Men’s Talent Award: Matthew Humphreys
- Emerging Women’s Talent Award: Amy Hunter
- Inter-Provincial Series Player of the Year: Simi Singh
- Super Series Player of the Year: Laura Delany
- Club Cricket Official of the Year: Ian Houston
- Groundskeeping Team of the Year: Dean Simpson (Lisburn Cricket Club)
- Volunteering Excellence Award: Michael Hickey
- Club of the Year: Limerick CC
- Spirit of Cricket Award: Bready Cricket Club
- Outstanding Contribution to Coaching: Brían O’Rourke
- Outstanding Contribution to Irish Cricket: Roy Torrens.

=== 2022 ===
- Men’s International Player of the Year: Paul Stirling.
- Women’s International Player of the Year: Gaby Lewis.
- Men’s Club Player of the Year: Ani Chore
- Women’s Club Player of the Year: Laura Delany
- Emerging Men’s Talent Award: Matthew Humphreys
- Emerging Women’s Talent Award: Amy Hunter
- Inter-Provincial Series Player of the Year: George Dockrell
- Super Series Player of the Year: Gaby Lewis
- Club Cricket Official of the Year: Mary McElwee
- Groundskeeping Team of the Year: Dean Simpson (Lisburn Cricket Club)
- Volunteering Excellence Award: Bryan Milford
- Club of the Year: Bready CC
- Outstanding Contribution to Coaching: Ted Williamson
- Outstanding Contribution to Irish Cricket: Michael Sharp

=== 2023 ===
- Men’s International Player of the Year: Josh Little.
- Women’s International Player of the Year: Arlene Kelly.
- Men’s Club Player of the Year: David Delany
- Women’s Club Player of the Year: Amy Caulfield
- Emerging Men’s Talent Award: Cade Carmichael
- Emerging Women’s Talent Award: Jane Maguire
- Inter-Provincial Series Player of the Year: George Dockrell
- Super Series Player of the Year: Gaby Lewis
- Club Cricket Official of the Year: Declan Earley
- Groundskeeping Team of the Year: Eglinton Cricket Club
- Club Coach of the Year: Gareth Thompson
- Volunteering Excellence Award: Simon Galloway
- Club of the Year: Cork Harlequins
- Outstanding Contribution to Coaching: Brian Kelleher
- Outstanding Contribution to Irish Cricket: Paul Reynolds

=== 2024 ===
- Men’s International Player of the Year: Harry Tector.
- Women’s International Player of the Year: Orla Prendergast
- Men's Club Player of the Year: Morgan Topping
- Women's Club Player of the Year: Mollie Devine
- Men's Emerging Talent Award: Chris de Freitas
- Women's Emerging Talent Award: Freya Sargent
- Inter-Provincial Series Player of the Year: Neil Rock
- Super Series Player of the Year: Amy Hunter.
- Volunteer of the Year: Dermot Ward
- Activator of the Year: Maria Van der Munckhof
- Coach of the Year: Robert Delaney
- Groundskeeping Team of the Year: Matt Reed
- Club Cricket Official of the Year: David Caldwell
- Club of the Year: Waringstown CC
- Outstanding Contribution to Irish Cricket: Alan Lewis

=== 2025 ===
- Men's International Player of the Year: Mark Adair
- Women's International Player of the Year: Orla Prendergast
- Men's Club Player of the Year: Scott Macbeth
- Women's Club Player of the Year: Lara Maritz
- Men's Emerging Talent Award: Scott Macbeth
- Women's Emerging Talent Award: Christina Coulter Reilly
- Inter-Provincial Series Player of the Year: Ruhan Pretorius
- Super Series Player of the Year: Orla Prendergast
- Volunteer of the Year: Sarfraz Ramay
- Activator of the Year: Stuart Conroy
- Coach of the Year: Mark Olphert
- Groundskeeping Team of the Year: Stormont
- Club Cricket Official of the Year: Alan Neill
- Club of the Year: Pembroke CC
- Outstanding Contribution to Irish Cricket: Lawrence Moore

== Hall of fame ==
The Cricket Writers of Ireland established the Irish Cricket Hall of Fame in 2009; it subsequently merged into Irish Cricket Awards.

=== List of Hall of fame inductees ===
- 2009: Dougie Goodwin, Alec O'Riordan
- 2010: Stephen Warke, Ivan Anderson
- 2011: Ossie Colhoun, Roy Torrens
- 2012: Gerry Duffy, Brendan O'Brien
- 2013: Michael Halliday, Simon Corlett
- 2014: Jack Short
- 2015: Alf Masood
- 2016: Paul Jackson
- 2017: Mary-Pat Moore, Miriam Grealey
- 2018: Garfield Harrison
- 2020: Alan Lewis, Susan Bray
- 2021: Peter Gillespie, Caitriona Beggs, Jimmy Boucher.
- 2022: Angus Dunlop, Barbara McDonald, Dermott Monteith
- 2023: Andre Botha, Stella Owens, Bob Lambert
- 2024: Kyle McCallan, Saibh Young, Lucius Gwynn.
- 2025: Clare Shillington, Trent Johnston, Donald Shearer
