= 1991 European Women's Cricket Championship =

Cricket tournament held in the Netherlands

- Dates: 16 – 20 July 1991
- Cricket format: ODI (55-over)
- Tournament format(s): Round-robin, final
- Host: Netherlands
- Champions: England (3rd title)
- Participants: 4
- Matches: 7
- Most runs: (England) Wendy Watson (229)
- Most wickets: (England) Jo Chamberlain (12)

The 1991 European Women's Cricket Championship (Dutch: Europees Kampioenschap Dames Cricket 1991) was an international cricket tournament held in the Netherlands from 16 to 20 July 1991. It was the third edition of the Women's European Championship, and all matches at the tournament held One Day International (ODI) status.

Four teams participated, with the hosts, the Netherlands, joined by the three other European members of the International Women's Cricket Council (IWCC) – Denmark, England, and Ireland. A round-robin format was used, with the top two teams proceeding to the final. England was undefeated in the round-robin stage and beat Denmark by 179 runs in the final, winning the championship for the third time in a row. The tournament was marked by low scoring, with the seven matches yielding only two individual half-centuries and one team score over 200. England's Wendy Watson led the tournament in runs for a third consecutive time, while her teammate Jo Chamberlain was the leading wicket-taker. All matches at the tournament were played in Haarlem, at the Sportpark Koninklijke HFC.

== Squads ==
Denmark Coach: Stig Hammerhøj	England Coach: Ruth Prideaux	Ireland Coach: Joseph Caprani	Netherlands Coach: Marc Nota
Janni Jønsson (c); Charlotte Smith (vc); Dorte Christiansen; Trine Christiansen; Mette Frost; Mette Gregersen; Lene Hansen; Heidi Jensen; Jane Jensen; Susanne Nielsen; Vibeke Nielsen; Lene Slebsager; Lene Udberg	Helen Plimmer (c); Gillian Smith (vc); Jo Chamberlain; Sarah-Jane Cook; Janet Godman; Carole Hodges; Suzie Kitson; Debra Maybury; Susan Metcalfe; Marie Moralee; Lisa Nye; Karen Smithies; Wendy Watson	Mary-Pat Moore (c); Miriam Grealey (vc); Donna Armstrong; Susan Bray; Rachel Hardiman; Judith Herbison; Anne Linehan; Gillian McCall; Elizabeth Owens; Stella Owens; Nikki Squire; Sarah Veale; Janice Walsh; Saibh Young	Irene Schoof (c); Caroline de Fouw; Hilone Dinnissen; Sandra Kottman; Dorine Loman; Geeske Ludwig; Nicola Payne; Remke Scheepstra; Pauline te Beest; Jet van Noortwijk; Karen van Rijn; Esther Veltman; Angela Venturini

== Round-robin ==
=== Points table ===
Team	Pld	W	L	T	NR	Pts	RR
England	3	3	0	0	0	6	3.092
Denmark	3	1	2	0	0	2	2.176
Ireland	3	1	2	0	0	2	1.982
Netherlands	3	1	2	0	0	2	1.875

Source: CricketArchive

=== Fixtures ===
16 July
Scorecard

England; 177/8 (55 overs)	v	Ireland; 102 (52.2 overs)

England won by 75 runs
Sportpark Koninklijke HFC, Haarlem

- Ireland won the toss and elected to bowl.

16 July
Scorecard

Netherlands; 126 (54.5 overs)	v	Denmark; 122 (54.2 overs)

Netherlands won by 4 runs
Sportpark Koninklijke HFC, Haarlem

- Denmark won the toss and elected to bowl.

17 July
Scorecard

Denmark; 132/7 (55 overs)	v	Ireland; 90 (49 overs)

Denmark won by 42 runs
Sportpark Koninklijke HFC, Haarlem

- Ireland won the toss and elected to bowl.
- Denmark beat Ireland in an ODI for the first and only time in its history.

17 July
Scorecard

England; 178/8 (55 overs)	v	Netherlands; 88/9 (55 overs)

England won by 90 runs
Sportpark Koninklijke HFC, Haarlem

- England won the toss and elected to bat.

19 July
Scorecard

Denmark; 47 (29 overs)	v	England; 48/1 (20.2 overs)

England won by 9 wickets
Sportpark Koninklijke HFC, Haarlem

- England won the toss and elected to bowl.

19 July
Scorecard

Ireland; 97 (44.3 overs)	v	Netherlands; 72 (42.4 overs)

Ireland won by 25 runs
Sportpark Koninklijke HFC, Haarlem

- Ireland won the toss and elected to bat.

== Final ==
20 July
Scorecard

England; 225/5 (55 overs)	v	Denmark; 46 (33 overs)
Wendy Watson 69 (109); Janni Jønsson 2/35 (11 overs)		Lene Hansen 8 (10); Carole Hodges 4/14 (9 overs)

England won by 179 runs
Sportpark Koninklijke HFC, Haarlem

- England won the toss and elected to bat.

== Statistics ==
=== Most runs ===
The top five run scorers (total runs) are included in this table.

Player	Team	Runs	Inns	Avg	Highest	100s	50s
Wendy Watson	England	102	3	34.00	69	0	1
Helen Plimmer	England	99	3	33.00	50	0	1
Debra Maybury	England	97	3	32.33	47	0	0
Nicola Payne	Netherlands	67	3	22.33	41	0	0
Carole Hodges	England	65	4	21.66	26	0	0

Source: CricketArchive

=== Most wickets ===
The top five wicket takers are listed in this table, listed by wickets taken and then by bowling average.

Player	Team	Overs	Wkts	Ave	SR	Econ	BBI
Jo Chamberlain	England	37.0	12	3.91	18.50	1/27	7/8
Carole Hodges	England	31.0	8	6.25	23.25	1.61	4/14
Judith Herbison	Ireland	31.0	7	10.85	26.57	2.45	3/29
Suzie Kitson	England	28.2	6	7.33	28.33	1.55	3/26
Angela Venturini	Netherlands	29.3	6	9.16	29.50	1.86	4/17

Source: CricketArchive
