= Pakistan women's cricket team in Ireland in 2000 =

Pakistani women's cricket team in Ireland in 2000
	Ireland	Pakistan
- Dates: 23 July 2000 – 2 August 2000
Captains	Miriam Grealey	Shaiza Khan

One Day International series
- Results: Ireland won the 5-match series 4–0
Most runs	Saibh Young (165)	Nazia Nazir (97)
Most wickets	Saibh Young (11)	Sharmeen Khan (5)
- Player of the series: Saibh Young (Ire)

The Pakistani women's cricket team toured Ireland in between 23 July and 2 August 2000 to play against the Irish women's national cricket team in a 5 match WODI series and in a one-off Test match, which was also the first ever Test appearance for Ireland women's cricket team and also marked the first ever Test match to be held in Ireland.

Originally, the ODI series between the two teams were initially scheduled to be held as a 3 match series but later both Pakistan and Ireland agreed to play in further two WODI matches after the solitary Test finished only within a space of 2 days. Ireland won the WODI series 4-0 and the only Test match. The Irish women's cricket team won the WODI series after winning the first three ODI matches (3-0) just prior to the start of the only Test match, with Ireland winning the 4th One Day International on the next day (on 1 August 2000) after the conclusion of the Test match which ended on 31 July 2000 and the fifth being abandoned due to rain.

The Irish team won the historical Test match on its debut against Pakistan by an innings and 54 runs which was held in Dublin. This was also the only international Test cricket match hosted by Ireland until 2018.

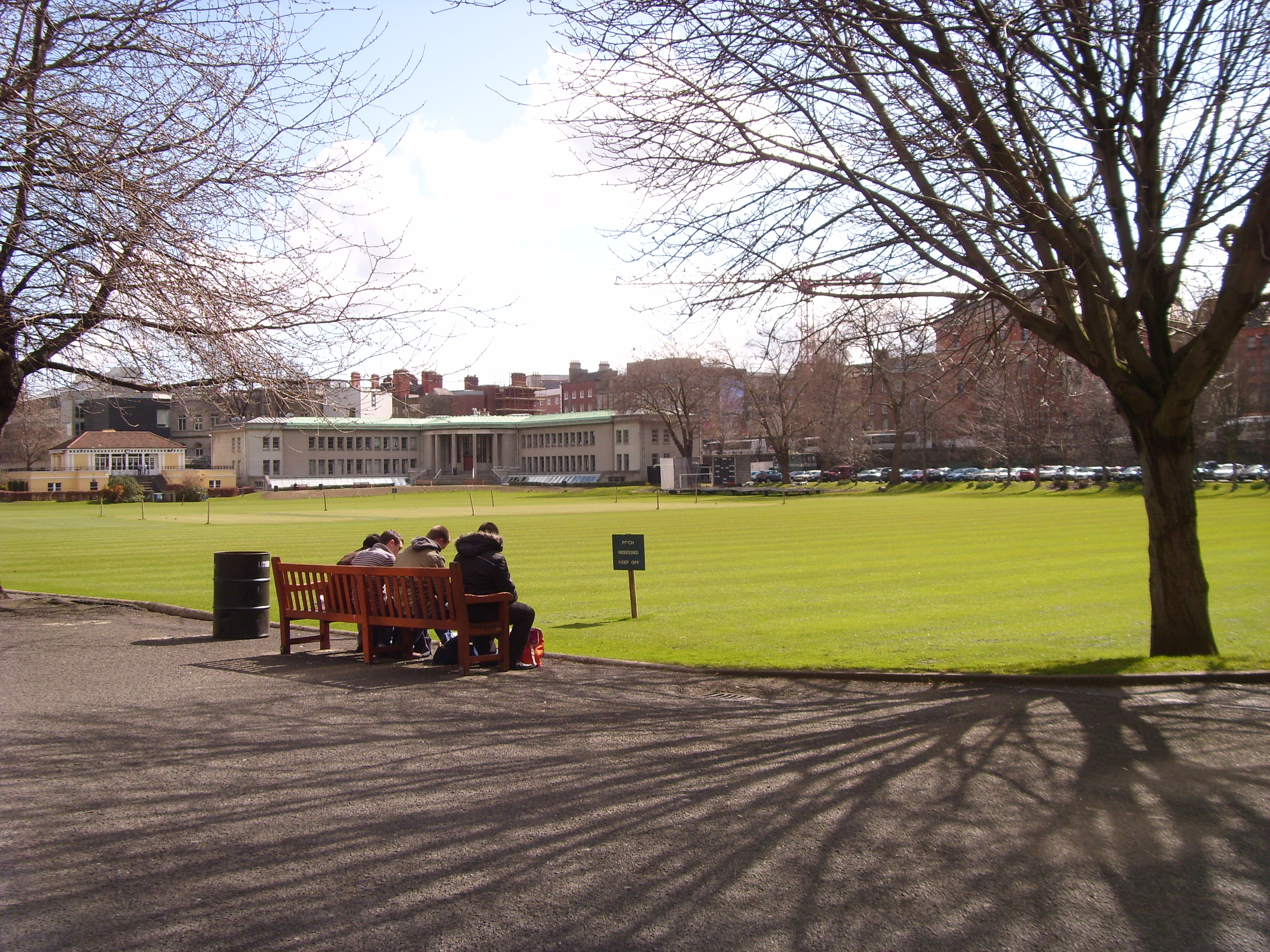
The College Park in Dublin holds the unique distinction for holding the first ever test match cricket in Ireland for either men or women

18 years later after the first Test appearance for the Ireland women's cricket team, their male counterparts, the Ireland men's national cricket team also made its Test debut against Pakistan in 2018.

Isobel Joyce who made her Women's Test debut in 2000 against Pakistan for Irish women's team along with Ed Joyce who made his Test debut in 2018 for Irish men's team became only the second brother-sister siblings to have played in Test cricket following Denise Emerson and Terry Alderman of Australia. Ed Joyce and Isobel Joyce are also the only brother-sister siblings combination to have made their Test debuts when playing for their respective gender teams on the country's first ever Test appearances.

== WODI series ==
=== 1st WODI ===
23 July 2000
Scorecard

Pakistan; 95 (42.2 overs)	v	Ireland; 98/1 (20.5 overs)
Shaiza Khan 30 (80); Saibh Young 3/7 (5 overs)		Saibh Young 53 (61); Shaiza Khan 1/36 (6.5 overs)

Ireland Women won by 9 wickets
College Park, Dublin
Player of the match: Saibh Young (Ire)

- Ireland won the toss and elected to field

=== 2nd WODI ===
25 July 2000
Scorecard

Ireland; 242/7 (50 overs)	v	Pakistan; 125 (45.5 overs)
Miriam Grealey 101; Shaiza Khan 3/35 (10 overs)		Nazia Nazir 32; Saibh Young 4/32 (9.5 overs)

Ireland Women won by 117 runs
Rush Cricket Club, Dublin
Player of the match: Miriam Grealey (Ire)

- Pakistan won the toss and elected to field

=== 3rd WODI ===
27 July 2000
Scorecard

Ireland; 269/4 (50 overs)	v	Pakistan; 119 (40.4 overs)
Karen Young 120; Sharmeen Khan 2/39 (9 overs)		Nazia Nazir 26; Barbara McDonald 4/8 (6.4 overs)

Ireland Women won by 150 runs
Pembroke Cricket Club, Dublin
Player of the match: Karen Young (Ire)

- Pakistan won the toss and elected to field

=== 4th WODI ===
1 August 2000
Scorecard

Ireland; 208/7 (50 overs)	v	Pakistan; 70 (33.3 overs)
Caitriona Beggs 51; Nazia Nazir 3/35 (10 overs)		Nazia Nazir 24; Saibh Young 3/18 (7 overs)

Ireland Women won by 138 runs
College Park, Dublin
Player of the match: Saibh Young (Ire)

- Pakistan won the toss and elected to field

=== 5th WODI ===
2 August 2000
Scorecard

Ireland	v	Pakistan

College Park, Dublin

- No toss
- Match abandoned without a ball being bowled

== Test series ==
=== Only Test ===
30-31 July 2000
Scorecard

Pakistan	v	Ireland
53 (47.4 overs); Zehmarad Afzal 25 (124); Ciara Metcalfe 4/26 (12 overs)		193/3d (47 overs); Caitriona Beggs 68 not out (128); Nazia Nazir 2/48 (11 overs)
86 (54.1 overs); Zehmarad Afzal 20 (54); Catherine O'Neill 3/12 (14 overs)

Ireland women won by an innings and 54 runs
College Park, Dublin
Umpires: Sid Moore and Alan Tuffery (Ire)
Player of the match: Isobel Joyce (Ire)

- Pakistan won the toss and elected to bat.
- Isobel Joyce, Ciara Metcalfe, Caitriona Beggs, Catherine O'Neill, Karen Young, Clare O'Leary, Miriam Grealey, Anne Linehan, Clare Shillington, Saibh Young, Barbara McDonald (Ire), Zehmarad Afzal, Sajjida Shah, Khursheed Jabeen and Uzma Gondal (Pak) all made their Test debuts.
