= 2002–03 World Series of Women's Cricket =

- Dates: 26 January – 8 February 2003
- Cricket format: ODI (50 overs)
- Host: New Zealand
- Champions: Australia
- Runners-up: New Zealand
- Participants: 4
- Matches: 14
- Most runs: Belinda Clark (Aus) (343)
- Most wickets: Cathryn Fitzpatrick (Aus) (15)

The World Series of Women's Cricket was a Women's One Day International series which took place in New Zealand in January and February 2003. The four teams competing were Australia, England, India and New Zealand. The tournament consisted of a double round-robin group stage, in which Australia and New Zealand finished as the top two, and then a third-place play-off and a final were contested to decide the final positions. Australia defeated New Zealand by 109 runs in the final. The three matches that took place between Australia and New Zealand at the tournament were also played for the Rose Bowl, which was won by Australia 3–0. Following the tour, England went on to tour Australia for The Women's Ashes.

== Squads ==
Australia	England	India	New Zealand
Belinda Clark (c); Alex Blackwell; Kris Britt; Melissa Bulow; Cathryn Fitzpatrick; Michelle Goszko; Julie Hayes; Mel Jones; Emma Liddell; Julia Price (wk); Karen Rolton; Clea Smith; Lisa Sthalekar	Clare Connor (c); Arran Brindle; Sarah Collyer; Charlotte Edwards; Mandie Godliman (wk); Laura Harper; Dawn Holden; Kathryn Leng; Laura Newton; Lucy Pearson; Nicky Shaw; Laura Spragg; Claire Taylor; Clare Taylor	Anjum Chopra (c); Nooshin Al Khadeer; Neetu David; Rumeli Dhar; Jhulan Goswami; Bindeshwari Goyal; Hemlata Kala; Mamata Kanojia; Reema Malhotra; Babita Mandlik; Sulakshana Naik (wk); Sunetra Paranjpe; Mithali Raj; Amita Sharma; Jaya Sharma	Emily Drumm (c); Nicola Browne; Amanda Green; Frances King; Maia Lewis; Michelle Lynch; Sara McGlashan; Louise Milliken; Nicola Payne; Kate Pulford; Rebecca Rolls (wk); Rebecca Steele; Haidee Tiffen; Aimee Watkins

== Tour Matches ==
24 January 2003
Scorecard

New Zealand A 155/8 (50 overs)	v	Australia; 157/6 (43 overs)
Michelle Lynch 77 (142); Clea Smith 3/28 (8 overs)		Karen Rolton 45 (52); Beth McNeill 1/16 (6 overs)

Australia Women won by 4 wickets
Lincoln Green, Lincoln
Umpires: Jeremy Busby (NZ) and Dave Quested (NZ)

- New Zealand A Women won the toss and elected to bat.

24 January 2003
Scorecard

New Zealand; 235/5 (50 overs)	v	India; 35/1 (14 overs)
Rebecca Rolls 63 (76); Nooshin Al Khadeer 2/29 (8 overs)		Jaya Sharma 11* (50); Louise Milliken 1/7 (3 overs)

No result
Hagley Oval, Christchurch
Umpires: Glenn Holdem (NZ) and Ian Shine (NZ)

- India Women won the toss and elected to field.

25 January 2003
Scorecard

England; 199/7 (50 overs)	v	New Zealand A 200/9 (49.4 overs)
Arran Brindle 75 (99); Maree Hannay 3/42 (9 overs)		Megan Kane 57 (70); Nicky Shaw 3/33 (9 overs)

New Zealand A Women won by 1 wicket
Lincoln Green, Lincoln
Umpires: Mike George (NZ) and Dave Quested (NZ)

- England Women won the toss and elected to bat.

== Points table ==
Note: P = Played, W = Wins, L = Losses, BP = Bonus Points, CP = Consolation Points, Pts = Points, NRR = Net run rate.

Pos	Team	P	W	L	BP	CP	Pts	NRR
1	Australia	6	6	0	6	0	36	+1.393
2	New Zealand	6	4	2	3	0	23	+0.343
3	India	6	1	5	1	1	7	−0.795
4	England	6	1	5	0	1	6	−0.936

- Source: CricketArchive

== Fixtures ==
=== Group stage ===
26 January 2003
Scorecard

Australia; 223/6 (50 overs)	v	New Zealand; 160/9 (50 overs)
Karen Rolton 86 (84); Frances King 4/24 (10 overs)		Nicola Payne 36 (83); Karen Rolton 2/17 (6 overs)

Australia Women won by 63 runs
Bert Sutcliffe Oval, Lincoln
Umpires: Doug Cowie (NZ) and Mike George (NZ)

- Australia Women won the toss and elected to bat.
- Points: Australia Women 6, New Zealand Women 0
- Kris Britt (Aus), Amanda Green and Michelle Lynch (NZ) all made their WODI debuts.

27 January 2003
Scorecard

England; 86 (35.5 overs)	v	India; 89/4 (29.5 overs)
Charlotte Edwards 23 (54); Nooshin Al Khadeer 5/14 (6.5 overs)		Jaya Sharma 33 (64); Clare Taylor 2/15 (9 overs)

India Women won by 6 wickets
Bert Sutcliffe Oval, Lincoln
Umpires: Doug Cowie (NZ) and Mike George (NZ)

- India Women won the toss and elected to field.
- Points: India Women 6, England Women 0
- Rumeli Dhar (Ind) made her WODI debut.

28 January 2003
Scorecard

New Zealand; 248/5 (50 overs)	v	India; 165/5 (50 overs)
Nicola Payne 93 (130); Nooshin Al Khadeer 2/44 (10 overs)		Sunetra Paranjpe 41 (85); Emily Drumm 1/17 (3 overs)

New Zealand Women won by 83 runs
Bert Sutcliffe Oval, Lincoln
Umpires: Dave Quested (NZ) and Evan Watkin (NZ)

- New Zealand Women won the toss and elected to bat.
- Points: New Zealand Women 6, India Women 0
- Rebecca Steele (NZ) made her WODI debut.

29 January 2003
Scorecard

England; 156/8 (50 overs)	v	Australia; 157/3 (39.3 overs)
Claire Taylor 35 (50); Emma Liddell 1/19 (8 overs)		Karen Rolton 68* (102); Laura Harper 2/31 (10 overs)

Australia Women won by 7 wickets
Bert Sutcliffe Oval, Lincoln
Umpires: Gary Baxter (NZ) and Kathy Cross (NZ)

- England Women won the toss and elected to bat.
- Points: Australia Women 6, England Women 0
- Alex Blackwell (Aus) made her WODI debut.

30 January 2003
Scorecard

England; 140 (46.4 overs)	v	New Zealand; 141/6 (39.1 overs)
Sarah Collyer 29 (71); Emily Drumm 3/8 (5 overs)		Rebecca Rolls 41 (33); Laura Harper 2/17 (10 overs)

New Zealand Women won by 4 wickets
Lincoln No. 3, Lincoln
Umpires: Evan Watkin (NZ) and Kathy Cross (NZ)

- England Women won the toss and elected to bat.
- Points: New Zealand Women 6, England Women 0

1 February 2003
Scorecard

Australia; 216/9 (50 overs)	v	India; 157/9 (50 overs)
Karen Rolton 68 (82); Neetu David 2/30 (10 overs)		Mithali Raj 36 (51); Julie Hayes 3/28 (10 overs)

Australia Women won by 59 runs
Lincoln No. 3, Lincoln
Umpires: Gary Baxter (NZ) and Robert Anderson (NZ)

- Australia Women won the toss and elected to bat.
- Points: Australia Women 6, India Women 0
- Melissa Bulow (Aus), Babita Mandlik and Reema Malhotra (Ind) all made their WODI debuts.

2 February 2003
Scorecard

Australia; 226/8 (50 overs)	v	England; 120 (50 overs)
Belinda Clark 81 (106); Sarah Collyer 2/31 (9 overs)		Clare Connor 29 (69); Kris Britt 4/16 (7 overs)

Australia Women won by 106 runs
Lincoln No. 3, Lincoln
Umpires: Gary Baxter (NZ) and Robert Anderson (NZ)

- Australia Women won the toss and elected to bat.
- Points: Australia Women 6, England Women 0

2 February 2003
Scorecard

New Zealand; 239/9 (50 overs)	v	India; 186 (47.2 overs)
Rebecca Rolls 59 (37); Nooshin Al Khadeer 4/38 (9 overs)		Mithali Raj 82 (98); Emily Drumm 3/26 (7 overs)

New Zealand Women won by 57 runs
Bert Sutcliffe Oval, Lincoln
Umpires: Dave Quested (NZ) and Jeremy Busby (NZ)

- New Zealand Women won the toss and elected to field.
- Points: New Zealand Women 6, India Women 0

3 February 2003
Scorecard

England; 173/9 (50 overs)	v	New Zealand; 174/3 (44.3 overs)
Sarah Collyer 39 (89); Rebecca Steele 3/31 (10 overs)		Emily Drumm 93 (115); Dawn Holden 1/19 (5.3 overs)

New Zealand Women won by 7 wickets
Bert Sutcliffe Oval, Lincoln
Umpires: Gary Baxter (NZ) and Robert Anderson (NZ)

- England Women won the toss and elected to bat.
- Points: New Zealand Women 5, England Women 1

4 February 2003
Scorecard

India; 134/7 (50 overs)	v	Australia; 135/1 (28 overs)
Anjum Chopra 25 (84); Alex Blackwell 2/18 (6 overs)		Lisa Sthalekar 58* (80); Amita Sharma 1/25 (6 overs)

Australia Women won by 9 wickets
Bert Sutcliffe Oval, Lincoln
Umpires: Robert Anderson (NZ) and Tony Hill (NZ)

- India Women won the toss and elected to bat.
- Points: Australia Women 6, India Women 0
- Mamata Kanojia (Ind) made her WODI debut.

6 February 2003
Scorecard

New Zealand; 174 (49.1 overs)	v	Australia; 175/4 (40 overs)
Maia Lewis 43 (85); Cathryn Fitzpatrick 5/27 (9.1 overs)		Belinda Clark 67 (87); Rebecca Steele 2/29 (10 overs)

Australia Women won by 6 wickets
Bert Sutcliffe Oval, Lincoln
Umpires: Glenn Holdem (NZ) and Tony Hill (NZ)

- New Zealand Women won the toss and elected to bat.
- Points: Australia Women 6, New Zealand Women 0

6 February 2003
Scorecard

England; 208/4 (50 overs)	v	India; 207 (50 overs)
Charlotte Edwards 79* (94); Neetu David 1/20 (10 overs)		Mithali Raj 98 (126); Sarah Collyer 2/35 (9 overs)

England Women won by 1 run
Lincoln No. 3, Lincoln
Umpires: Gary Baxter (NZ) and Jeremy Busby (NZ)

- India Women won the toss and elected to field.
- Points: England Women 5, India Women 1

=== Third-place play-off ===
7 February 2003
Scorecard

England; 191 (48.1 overs)	v	India; 101 (43.5 overs)
Kathryn Leng 80 (109); Neetu David 3/42 (10 overs)		Mithali Raj 26 (45); Sarah Collyer 3/9 (9.5 overs)

England Women won by 90 runs
Bert Sutcliffe Oval, Lincoln
Umpires: Gary Baxter (NZ) and Tony Hill (NZ)

- England Women won the toss and elected to bat.

=== Final ===
8 February 2003
Scorecard

Australia; 214 (49.5 overs)	v	New Zealand; 105 (30 overs)
Belinda Clark 80 (119); Frances King 3/44 (9.5 overs)		Aimee Watkins 31 (42); Julie Hayes 3/31 (7 overs)

Australia Women won by 109 runs
Bert Sutcliffe Oval, Lincoln
Umpires: Gary Baxter (NZ) and Tony Hill (NZ)

- Australia Women won the toss and elected to bat.
- Australia Women won the 2002–03 World Series of Women's Cricket.
- Australia Women won the 2002–03 Rose Bowl 3–0.

== Statistics ==
=== Most runs ===
Player	Team	Innings	Runs	Average	Strike rate	Highest Score
Belinda Clark	Australia	7	343	49.00	64.83	81
Mithali Raj	India	7	292	41.71	67.28	98
Karen Rolton	Australia	7	291	58.20	81.51	86
Lisa Sthalekar	Australia	6	189	37.80	63.85	59
Maia Lewis	Australia	7	186	46.50	50.68	50
Source: ESPNcricinfo

=== Most wickets ===
Player	Team	Overs	Wickets	Average	Economy	BBI
Cathryn Fitzpatrick	Australia	54.1	15	10.06	2.78	5/27
Nooshin Al Khadeer	India	63.5	14	17.28	3.79	5/14
Frances King	New Zealand	43.1	11	15.90	4.05	4/24
Julie Hayes	Australia	65.0	10	17.70	2.72	3/28
Emma Liddell	Australia	62.0	9	21.11	3.06	3/31
Source: ESPNcricinfo

== See also ==
- English women's cricket team in Australia in 2002–03
- Rose Bowl series
