= England women's cricket team in Australia in 2002–03 =

English women's cricket team in Australia in 2002–03
	Australia	England
- Dates: 12 – 25 February 2003
Captains	Belinda Clark	Clare Connor

Test series
- Result: Australia won the 2-match series 1–0
Most runs	Lisa Sthalekar (144)	Charlotte Edwards (140)
Most wickets	Cathryn Fitzpatrick (14)	Lucy Pearson (15)
- Player of the series: Cathryn Fitzpatrick (Aus)

The English women's cricket team toured Australia in February 2003, where Australia were defending the Women's Ashes. The two sides had just played in an ODI quadrangular tournament in New Zealand, the 2002–03 World Series of Women's Cricket, which was won by Australia. Australia won the first test by five wickets, whilst the second test was drawn after being heavily affected by rain. Australia therefore retained the Ashes.

== Squads ==
Australia	England
Belinda Clark (c); Alex Blackwell; Kris Britt; Cathryn Fitzpatrick; Michelle Goszko; Julie Hayes; Mel Jones; Terry McGregor; Julia Price (wk); Karen Rolton; Lisa Sthalekar; Emma Twining	Clare Connor (c); Sarah Collyer; Charlotte Edwards; Lydia Greenway; Laura Harper; Dawn Holden; Kathryn Leng; Laura Newton; Lucy Pearson; Nicky Shaw; Laura Spragg; Clare Taylor; Claire Taylor (wk); Arran Thompson

== Tour matches ==
=== 2-day match: Australia Under-23s v England ===
12–13 February 2003
Scorecard

England	v	Australia Under-23s
202 (94.4 overs); Lydia Greenway 88 (225); Lauren Ebsary 4/35 (17 overs)		131 (68.3 overs); Ingrid Noack 50 (190); Laura Harper 5/30 (19 overs)
44/2 (19.4 overs); Kathryn Leng 25* (50); Belinda Matheson 1/5 (1.4 overs)

Match drawn
Allan Border Field, Brisbane
Umpires: Greg Cubit (Aus) and Tim Laycock (Aus)

- England Women won the toss and elected to field.

== Test series ==
=== 1st Test ===
15 – 17 February 2003
Scorecard

England	v	Australia
124 (108.3 overs); Sarah Collyer 29 (133); Cathryn Fitzpatrick 4/32 (29.3 overs)		78 (41.4 overs); Mel Jones 22 (67); Lucy Pearson 4/31 (15 overs)
92 (67.3 overs); Charlotte Edwards 27 (51); Cathryn Fitzpatrick 4/28 (20 overs)		139/5 (68 overs); Belinda Clark 47 (115); Sarah Collyer 2/17 (25 overs)

Australia Women won by 5 wickets
The Gabba, Brisbane
Umpires: Bruce Oxenford (Aus) and Norm McNamara (Aus)
Player of the match: Cathryn Fitzpatrick (Aus)

- Australia Women won the toss and elected to field.
- Alex Blackwell, Emma Liddell, Lisa Sthalekar (Aus) and Lydia Greenway (Eng) all made their WTest debuts.

=== 2nd Test ===
22 – 25 February 2003
Scorecard

Australia	v	England
134 (67.1 overs); Mel Jones 58 (124); Lucy Pearson 7/51 (25 overs)		187 (115.4 overs); Claire Taylor 48 (123); Julie Hayes 3/32 (21.4 overs)
259/7d (144 overs); Lisa Sthalekar 120* (329); Lucy Pearson 4/56 (33 overs)		133/6 (83 overs); Charlotte Edwards 67 (209); Cathryn Fitzpatrick 4/15 (19 overs)

Match drawn
Bankstown Oval, Sydney
Umpires: Nick Fowler (Aus) and Shane Reed (Aus)
Player of the match: Lucy Pearson (Aus)

- England Women won the toss and elected to field.
- Kris Britt (Aus) made their WTest debut.

== See also ==
- 2002–03 World Series of Women's Cricket
