= Herbison =

Herbison may refer to:

- David Herbison (1800–1880), Irish poet
- Jason Herbison (born 1972), Australian writer
- Jean Herbison (1923–2007), New Zealand academic, educator, researcher and Chancellor of the University of Canterbury
- Judith Herbison (born 1971), former Irish international cricketer
- Margaret (Peggy) Herbison (1907–1996), Scottish politician
- Nancy Herbison (born 1957), Canadian opera singer, see Nancy Argenta
