= Elaine Nolan =

Irish cricketer

Personal information
- Full name: Elaine Mary Hannah Nolan
- Born: 5 August 1981 (age 45); Dublin, Ireland
- Batting: Right-handed
- Bowling: Right-arm medium
- Role: Bowler

International information
- National side: Ireland (2006–2008)
- ODI debut (cap 54): 22 August 2006 v Netherlands
- Last ODI: 18 February 2008 v Pakistan

Career statistics
Competition	WODI
Matches	4
Runs scored	0
Batting average	0.00
100s/50s	0/0
Top score	0
Balls bowled	126
Wickets	1
Bowling average	81.00
5 wickets in innings	0
10 wickets in match	0
Best bowling	1/17
Catches/stumpings	0/–
- Source: CricketArchive, 22 April 2022

Elaine Mary Hannah Nolan (born 5 August 1981) is an Irish former cricketer who played as a right-arm medium bowler. She appeared in four One Day Internationals for Ireland between 2006 and 2008.

In December 2016, she was appointed to the role of participation director for Cricket Ireland. She was previously employed as game development manager for New Zealand Cricket.
