= Hommels =

Hommels is a surname. Notable people with the surname include:

- Klaus Hommels (born 1967), German venture capitalist
- Marieke Hommels, Dutch cricketer
