= Limerick Cricket Club =

Limerick Cricket Club is a cricket team based in Limerick, Ireland. The club is a member of the Munster Cricket Union and plays in competitions organised by the Union as well as national competitions organised by Cricket Ireland.

== History ==
Limerick Cricket Club was founded in 1968 through the consolidation of the then existing Catholic Institute Cricket Team and that of the Limerick Protestant Young Men's Association (LPYMA).

The 1980s was a successful decade for the club. For the first time in 1982, the club won the Munster Senior Cup. The club won the trophy two further times in 1986 and 1988, and were beaten finalists in 1980 and 1984. The club also won the league in 1984, 1985 and 1988.

During the early 1990s the club won the Munster Junior Cup twice and a memorable Munster Minor Cup and League double in 1992. During the mid-to-late 1990s, the club won two Munster Senior Shields and the Munster Senior Cup in 1994.

In the early years of the millennium the club won the Munster Minor Cup in 2001 and Munster Senior Shields in 2003 and 2005 and Munster Senior League titles in 2004 and 2005. The club also won the Junior League in 2004 and the Junior Cup.

In 2011 the club's Minor Team had a remarkable season, ending with a Munster Minor Cup and League double.

In 2018 the club progressed through all rounds of the Cricket Ireland National Cup, narrowly losing out in the final to Rush CC. In 2019, the club were successful in winning the Munster Minor T20 Cup. In 2020, the club were the recipients to Cricket Ireland's Club of the Year award.

== Grounds ==
Since its inception, Limerick Cricket Club could well be described as nomadic. Initially the club's home ground was at the LPYMA ground until the early 1970s. The ground suffered from vandalism so a move was made to the Catholic Institute ground in Rosbrien, which was used for a couple of seasons; however, the wicket was difficult to maintain.

The Club then moved to the DeBeers (now Element Six) ground in Shannon, County Clare.

Because of the distance involved and drop in numbers from the Shannon contingent, it was decided to move back to Limerick to the Catholic Institute, and the name reverted to Limerick Cricket Club. After a couple of seasons at the Catholic Institute, the Club was on the move again. The nomadic nature of the club led to stints at Crescent College, the County Club on the Meelick road, Lord Harrington's Estate in Patrickswell, Old Crescent, and at the University of Limerick, which the club moved to in 1990.

In 2011, Limerick Cricket Club moved to its new grounds in Adare thereby ending the nomadic existence of the club. James Spencer has been head groundsman since the 2013 season.

== Notable players ==
- John McDevitt – Played for the Irish cricket team in 1986.

== Honours ==
- Munster Senior Cup (6) - 1982, 1984, 1986, 1988, 1992, 1994
- Munster Senior League (7) - 1984, 1985, 1988, 1990, 1992, 2004, 2005
- Munster Senior Shield (4) - 1998, 1999, 2003, 2005
- Munster Senior Plate (2) - 2006, 2007
- Munster Junior Cup (3) - 1988, 1992, 2005
- Munster Junior League (6) - 1992, 2004, 2005, 2015, 2017, 2018
- Munster Junior T20 Cup (1) - 2019
- Munster Minor Cup (4) - 1992, 2001, 2011, 2017
- Munster Minor League (3) - 1992, 2011, 2012
- Munster Minor T20 Cup (1) - 2018

National Cup - Finalists 2018
