= Whichcord =

Whichcord is a surname. Notable people with the surname include:

- Claire Whichcord (born 1972), British cricketer
- John Whichcord Sr. (1790–1860), British architect
- John Whichcord Jr. (1823–1885), British architect
