= Remke Scheepstra =

Dutch cricketer

Personal information
- Full name: Remke Scheepstra
- Born: 13-09-1969; Rosmalen
- Role: Batter

International information
- National side: Netherlands (1991)
- Only ODI (cap 29): 17 July 1991 v England

Career statistics
Competition	WODI
Matches	1
Runs scored	1
Batting average	1.00
100s/50s	0/0
Top score	1
Catches/stumpings	0/–
- Source: ESPNcricinfo, 10 December 2022

Remke Scheepstra is a Dutch former cricketer who played as a batter. She appeared for Netherlands in one One Day International, at the 1991 European Women's Cricket Championship against England at Sportpark Koninklijke HFC, Haarlem. Batting at number six, she scored one run.
