= Lancashire county cricket teams =

Lancashire county cricket teams may refer to:

- Lancashire County Cricket Club
- Lancashire Women cricket team
- Manchester Cricket Club (pre-1864)
- Lancashire Cricket Board
- Lancashire Thunder
- East Lancashire Cricket Club
- Lancashire and Cheshire Women cricket team
