= International cricket in 1951 =

International cricket season

The 1954 International cricket season was from April 1951 to August 1951.

== Season overview ==
International tours
Start date	Home team	Away team	Results [Matches]			
Start date	Home team	Away team	Test	ODI	FC	LA
7 June 1951	England	South Africa	3–1 [5]	—	—	—
23 June 1951	Ireland	Scotland	—	—	0–1 [1]	—
25 August 1951	Netherlands	England	—	—	0–0 [1]	—
15 September 1951	Netherlands	South Africa	—	—	0–1 [2]	0–1 [2]

== June ==
=== South Africa in England ===
Test series
No.	Date	Home captain	Away captain	Venue	Result
Test 334	7–12 June	Freddie Brown	Dudley Nourse	Trent Bridge, Nottingham	South Africa by 78 runs
Test 335	21–23 June	Freddie Brown	Dudley Nourse	Lord's, London	England by 10 wickets
Test 336	5–10 July	Freddie Brown	Dudley Nourse	Old Trafford Cricket Ground, Manchester	England by 9 wickets
Test 337	26–31 July	Freddie Brown	Dudley Nourse	Headingley Cricket Ground, Leeds	Match drawn
Test 338	16–18 August	Freddie Brown	Dudley Nourse	Kennington Oval, London	England by 4 wickets

=== Scotland in Ireland ===
Three-day Match
No.	Date	Home captain	Away captain	Venue	Result
Match	23–26 June	Not mentioned	Not mentioned	College Park, Dublin	Scotland by 3 wickets

== August ==
=== England in Netherlands ===
Two-day Match
No.	Date	Home captain	Away captain	Venue	Result
Match	25–26 August	Not mentioned	Not mentioned	Not mentioned	Match drawn

== September ==
=== South Africa in Netherlands ===
Two-day Match
No.	Date	Home captain	Away captain	Venue	Result
Match 1	15 September	Not mentioned	Not mentioned	Sportpark Koninklijke HFC, Haarlem	South Africa by an innings and 39 runs
One-day Match
No.	Date	Home captain	Away captain	Venue	Result
Match 2	16 September	Not mentioned	Not mentioned	Sportpark Koninklijke HFC, Haarlem	South Africa by 164 runs
