= Ross McCollum =

Irish cricketer and sports administrator

Personal information
- Full name: Ross Andrew McCollum
- Born: 11 January 1964 (age 62); Belfast, Northern Ireland
- Batting: Right-handed
- Bowling: Right-arm off break
- Role: Batsman

Career statistics
Competition	List A
Matches	1
Runs scored	13
Batting average	13.00
100s/50s	0/0
Top score	13
Catches/stumpings	-/–
- Source: ESPNcricinfo, June 29, 2016

Ross Andrew McCollum (born 11 January 1964 in Belfast, Northern Ireland) is an Irish cricketer. He made his List A debut for Ireland national cricket team against Gloucestershire County Cricket Club in June 1988 at County Ground, Bristol.

McCollum is chairman of Cricket Ireland since 2010.
