= Hanne Sørensen =

Danish cricketer (born 1975)

Personal information
- Full name: Hanne Sørensen
- Born: July 19, 1975 (age 51)

International information
- National side: Denmark
- Only ODI (cap 27): 19 July 1995 v England

Career statistics
Competition	WODI
Matches	1
Runs scored	0
Batting average	0.00
100s/50s	0/0
Top score	0
Catches/stumpings	0/0
- Source: ESPNcricinfo, 28 September 2020

Hanne Sørensen (born 19 July 1975) is a former women's cricketer for the Denmark national women's cricket team who played one ODIs during the 1995 Women's European Cricket Cup. Appearing against England, she was dismissed without scoring a run in her only batting innings, and did not bowl.
