= Marguerite Burke =

Irish cricketer

Personal information
- Born: 29 December 1965 (age 60); Dublin, Ireland
- Batting: Right-handed
- Role: Batsman

International information
- National side: Ireland (1993–2000)
- ODI debut (cap 27): 25 July 1993 v Australia
- Last ODI: 27 July 2000 v Pakistan

Career statistics
Competition	ODI
Matches	4
Runs scored	24
Batting average	24.00
100s/50s	0/0
Top score	24
Catches/stumpings	0/–
- Source: ESPNCricinfo

Marguerite Burke (born 29 December 1965) is a former Irish international cricketer whose career for the Irish national team spanned from 1993 to 2000.

Burke was born in Dublin, and played her club cricket for Clontarf. Her international debut came at the 1993 World Cup in England, although she played in only a single match (against Australia), and neither batted nor bowled. Burke did not return to the national team until July 2000, when she played the first three matches of a five-match One Day International (ODI) series against Pakistan. She batted only in the second of those matches, scoring 24 runs from 36 balls, and did not again play at international level. There was a gap of six years and 364 days between Burke's first and second ODI appearances, the longest between ODIs for an Irishwoman.
