= Pamela Trohear =

Irish cricketer (born 1955)

Personal information
- Full name: Pamela Mary Trohear
- Born: January 9, 1955 (age 71); Downpatrick, County Down, Northern Ireland
- Batting: Right-handed
- Bowling: Right arm medium

International information
- National side: Ireland

Career statistics
Competition	WODI
Matches	2
Runs scored	10
Batting average	5.00
100s/50s	0/0
Top score	9
Balls bowled	-
Wickets	-
Bowling average	-
5 wickets in innings	-
10 wickets in match	-
Best bowling	-
Catches/stumpings	0/0
- Source: Cricinfo, 9 January 2018

Pamela Mary Trohear also known as Pam Trohear (born 9 January 1955) is a former Irish woman cricketer. She made her WODI debut against Australia in 1987. Pamela has played for Ireland in 2 Women's ODIs.
