= Tracey Skoyles =

Irish cricketer (born 1967)

Personal information
- Full name: Tracey Skoyles
- Born: 1967 (age 58–59); Ireland
- Batting: Right-handed
- Role: Batter

International information
- National side: Ireland (1997–1998)
- ODI debut (cap 38): 18 December 1997 v Pakistan
- Last ODI: 27 July 1998 v Australia

Career statistics
Competition	WODI	WLA
Matches	5	6
Runs scored	23	25
Batting average	7.66	6.25
100s/50s	0/0	0/0
Top score	7*	7*
Catches/stumpings	2/–	2/–
- Source: CricketArchive, 1 June 2022

Tracey Skoyles (born 1967) is an Irish former cricketer who played as a right-handed batter. She appeared in five One Day Internationals for Ireland in 1997 and 1998, including playing at the 1997 World Cup.
