= List of Ireland women Test cricketers =

This is a list of Irish women Test cricketers. A Test match is an international cricket match between two of the leading cricketing nations. The list is arranged in the order in which each player won her Test cap. Where more than one player won her first Test cap in the same Test match, those players are listed alphabetically by the surname the player was using at the time of the match. This list is correct to the end of the Test against Pakistan in 2000, which as of November 2006 is the last Test match Ireland had played.

== Key ==
General
*: an innings that ended not out
Mat: number of matches played
Batting
Inn: number of innings
NO: number of times an innings ends not out
Runs: number of runs scored by batsman/off bowler's bowling
HS: highest score
Avg: batting average
100/50: number of centuries and half-centuries scored

Bowling
Overs: number of overs bowled
Mdn: number of maiden overs (overs off which no runs were scored)
Wkt: number of wickets taken
BB: best bowling figures
Avg: bowling average
5wI: number of times 5 wickets were taken in an innings
Fielding
Ca: number of catches taken
St: number of stumpings made

== Players ==
Statistics are correct as of the Ireland women's only Test match, against Pakistan on 30 July 2000.

Cap	Name	Career	Mat	Inn	Runs	HS	Avg	50	Balls	Wkt	BB	Avg	5wI	Ca	St	Ref
1	Caitriona Beggs	2000	1	1	68	68*	–	1	–	–	–	–	–	0	0	
2	Miriam Grealey	2000	1	1	16	16	16.00	0	–	–	–	–	–	0	0	
3	Isobel Joyce	2000	1	0	–	–	–	–	67	6	6/21	3.50	1	1	0	
4	Anne Linehan	2000	1	1	27	27*	–	0	–	–	–	–	–	1	0	
5	Barbara McDonald	2000	1	0	–	–	–	–	156	4	3/9	7.00	0	1	0	
6	Ciara Metcalfe	2000	1	0	–	–	–	–	120	4	4/26	10.50	0	0	0	
7	Clare O'Leary	2000	1	1	0	0	0.00	0	–	–	–	–	–	0	0	
8	Catherine O'Neill	2000	1	0	–	–	–	–	166	6	3/12	4.50	0	0	0	
9	Clare Shillington	2000	1	0	–	–	–	–	–	–	–	–	–	1	0	
10	Karen Young	2000	1	1	58	58	58.00	1	–	–	–	–	–	1	0	
11	Saibh Young	2000	1	0	–	–	–	–	102	0	–	–	–	0	0	

== See also ==
- List of Ireland women ODI cricketers
- List of Ireland women Twenty20 International cricketers
