= Annette Kroon =

Dutch cricketer

Cricket information
- Role: Wicket-keeper

International information
- National side: Netherlands (1995)
- ODI debut (cap 34): 18 July 1995 v England
- Last ODI: 19 July 1995 v Ireland

Career statistics
Competition	WODI
Matches	2
Runs scored	–
Batting average	–
100s/50s	–
Top score	–
Catches/stumpings	1/1
- Source: ESPNcricinfo, 11 December 2017

Annette Kroon is a Dutch former cricketer who played as a wicket-keeper. She appeared for Netherlands in two One Day Internationals, both at the 1995 Women's European Cricket Cup in Dublin. She did not bat or bowl but took one catch and made one stumping.
