= Roy Torrens =

Irish cricketer and cricket coach (1948–2021)

Roy Torrens OBE
Personal information
- Full name: Robert Torrens
- Born: 17 April 1948; Derry, Northern Ireland
- Died: 23 January 2021 (aged 72)
- Batting: Right-handed
- Bowling: Right-arm fast-medium

Domestic team information
- Years: Team
- 1966–1982: Ireland

Career statistics
Competition	FC	LA
Matches	6	2
Runs scored	42	13
Batting average	6.00	6.50
100s/50s	–/–	–/–
Top score	17	9
Balls bowled	969	101
Wickets	26	2
Bowling average	15.46	45.50
5 wickets in innings	2	–
10 wickets in match	–	–
Best bowling	7/40	2/44
Catches/stumpings	1/–	–/–
- Source: Cricinfo, 24 January 2021

Robert "Roy" Torrens OBE (17 May 1948 – 23 January 2021) was an Irish cricketer, coach and manager of the Ireland cricket team between 2004 and 2016. He was also a footballer having won three amateur caps for the Northern Ireland squad.

== Career ==
Torrens was a right-handed batsman and a right-arm fast-medium bowler. He made his debut for Ireland on 20 July 1966 against Middlesex.

He represented Ireland in cricket 30 times, including six first-class appearances between 1966 and 1984, in which he took 26 wickets at the excellent average of 15.46. Overall, he took 77 wickets at an average of 25.66 with career best figures of 7/40 against Scotland in 1974 where Ireland bowled out Scotland for just 91. He also registered his highest individual score of 177 after spending an hour at the crease during a club match.

In addition, he also played professional football having represented both Derry City and Ballymena United F.C. in the Irish League Cup. He also led Northern Ireland side in a friendly match against Scotland in 1971 where he played alongside the likes of Martin O'Neill, Trevor Anderson and Tommy Craig.

He retired from cricket in 1984 and pursued his career as a selector of the Irish Cricket Union where he served from 1995 to 2000. He also served as the President of the Irish Cricket Union from 2000 to 2004. In 2004, he became the manager of the Irish men's cricket team, and headed their delegation to the 2007 Cricket World Cup. The Irish team had massive success in international cricket under his tenure as manager where Ireland shocked Pakistan, England and West Indies in the 2007, 2011 and 2015 World Cup tournaments respectively. Ireland also qualified to play in ICC T20 World Cup on four occasions under his tenure in 2009, 2010, 2012 and 2014. He served as the manager of Irish cricket team from 2004 until 2016 and also served as a pioneer of Ireland's journey to claim Test status in 2017.

Torrens was appointed an Officer of the Order of the British Empire (OBE) in the 2009 Birthday Honours "for services to Cricket and Football in Northern Ireland."

== Death ==
He died on 23 January 2021, of complications from COVID-19 at the age of 72. On 24 January 2021, Afghanistan and Ireland players observed one minute silence as a tribute to Roy Torrens prior to the second ODI match between the two teams at Abu Dhabi.
