= Marie Moralee =

English cricketer (born 1971)

Personal information
- Full name: Marie Frances Moralee
- Born: 26 June 1971 (age 55); Kent, England
- Role: All-rounder

International information
- National side: England (1991)
- ODI debut (cap 61): 17 July 1991 v Netherlands
- Last ODI: 20 July 1991 v Denmark

Domestic team information
- Years: Team
- 1988–2002: Kent

Career statistics
Competition	WODI	WFC	WLA
Matches	3	1	72
Runs scored	25	6	1,000
Batting average	–	3.00	17.24
100s/50s	0/0	0/0	0/3
Top score	24*	3	80
Balls bowled	42	126	2,702
Wickets	3	0	49
Bowling average	2.00	–	28.91
5 wickets in innings	0	0	0
10 wickets in match	–	0	–
Best bowling	3/6	–	3/6
Catches/stumpings	2/–	0/–	15/–
- Source: CricketArchive, 10 March 2021

Marie Frances Moralee (born 26 June 1971) is an English former cricketer who played as an all-rounder. She appeared in three One Day Internationals for England in the 1991 European Women's Cricket Championship. She took three wickets for just six runs on debut against The Netherlands. Across her three matches she took three wickets, scored 25 runs and took two catches. She played county cricket for Kent.
