= Alice Stanton =

Irish cricketer (born 1960)

Personal information
- Full name: Alice Veronica Stanton
- Born: December 5, 1960 (age 65); Dublin, Ireland
- Batting: Right-handed
- Bowling: Right arm slow

International information
- National side: Ireland

Career statistics
Competition	WODI
Matches	3
Runs scored	0
Batting average	-
100s/50s	-
Top score	-
Balls bowled	-
Wickets	0
Bowling average	-
5 wickets in innings	-
10 wickets in match	-
Best bowling	-
Catches/stumpings	0/0
- Source: Cricinfo, 7 January 2018

Alice Veronica Stanton (born 5 December 1960) is an Irish former cricketer. She played for Ireland in three Women's One Day Internationals (ODIs).

She made her Women's ODI debut in 1987, against Australia, and became the first Irish player to be dismissed for a duck in a Women's ODI.
