= Connacht Cricket Union =

Irish cricket governing body

- Sport: Cricket
- Abbreviation: CCU
- Founded: 2010
- Affiliation: Cricket Ireland
- Headquarters: Galway
- Location: Connacht Region
- President: Ronan F. Mahon
- Chairman: Jeff Smith

Official website
- www.connachtcricket.ie

The Connacht Cricket Union is one of the five provincial governing bodies for cricket in Ireland. Along with the Leinster Cricket Union, Munster Cricket Union, Northern Cricket Union and North West Cricket Union, it makes up Cricket Ireland (formerly known as the Irish Cricket Union). It is the main union under which cricket in the traditional Irish province of Connacht is played. It broke away from Munster Cricket Union and became a separate union in 2010, thus becoming the first Union to be formed in over 60 years.

== History ==
Cricket in Connacht had traditionally been administered by the Munster Cricket Union. Historically, Connacht had the first cricket club in Ireland with Galway Cricket Club and they played interprovincial matches until 1891. In 2005, the Munster Cricket Union organised a separate league for the Connacht based clubs for the first time. Despite the breakaway, it was not recognised by Cricket Ireland until 2021 when it was granted Associate status. They played their first interprovincial match since then in 2024 against Munster. It was formally recognised as a full member in 2025.

As of 2012, it has nine teams registered to the union, with seven playing in the League and eight in the Cups. It organises the Connacht Senior League (which is in its fourteenth season) and Connacht Senior Cup. 2012 saw sides from the CCU enter the national cup competitions for the first time. All the clubs were targeting under-age cricket as the next step and planning to kick off an under-age league over the next two years.
