= Henriette Hansen (cricketer) =

Danish cricketer

Personal information
- Full name: Henriette Hansen
- Bowling: Medium-slow

International information
- National side: Denmark
- ODI debut (cap 25): 18 July 1995 v Ireland
- Last ODI: 26 July 1998 v Netherlands

Career statistics
Competition	WODI
Matches	6
Runs scored	14
Batting average	2.80
100s/50s	0/0
Top score	8
Catches/stumpings	2/0
- Source: ESPNcricinfo, 28 September 2020

Henriette Hansen is a former cricketer for the Denmark national women's cricket team who played six ODIs. She made her debut against Ireland during the 1995 Women's European Cricket Cup, when she scored was dismissed without scoring a run as a lower-order batsman. Two years later, she played twice during the 1997 Women's Cricket World Cup. Her highest score in international cricket was 8 runs, which made against the Netherlands in 1995. In all, she scored 14 runs and took two catches for Denmark. She played domestic cricket for Svanholm Cricket Club.
