= Cliodhna Sharp =

Irish cricketer

Personal information
- Full name: Cliodhna Deirdre Sharp
- Born: 3 June 1976 (age 50); Dublin, Ireland
- Batting: Right-handed
- Bowling: Right-arm medium
- Role: Batter

International information
- National side: Ireland (1997–2000)
- ODI debut (cap 35): 8 August 1997 v South Africa
- Last ODI: 14 December 2000 v Netherlands

Career statistics
Competition	WODI	WLA
Matches	9	11
Runs scored	49	63
Batting average	7.00	7.87
100s/50s	0/0	0/0
Top score	19	19
Catches/stumpings	0/–	1/–
- Source: CricketArchive, 21 June 2022

Cliodhna Deirdre Sharp (born 3 June 1976) is an Irish former cricketer who played as a right-handed batter. She appeared in nine One Day Internationals for Ireland between 1997 and 2000.

Sharp was born in Dublin. She made her international debut in August 1997, aged 21, in a One Day International (ODI) match against South Africa. At the 1997 World Cup in India, Sharp played in only two of her team's matches, against Denmark and South Africa. She made four further ODI appearances over the following two seasons (three against Australia in 1998 and one against India in 1999), but had little success. Sharp's last matches for Ireland came at the 2000 World Cup in New Zealand. She again played in only two matches, scoring a career-high 19 runs against India, but making a five-ball duck against the Netherlands.
