= Claire Whichcord =

English cricketer

Personal information
- Full name: Claire Louise Whichcord
- Born: 9 December 1972 (age 53); Dover, Kent, England
- Batting: Right-handed
- Bowling: Right-arm medium
- Role: All-rounder

International information
- National side: England (1995)
- Only ODI (cap 68): 18 July 1995 v Netherlands

Domestic team information
- Years: Team
- 1990–1999: Kent

Career statistics
| Competition | WODI | WFC | WLA |
|---|---|---|---|
| Matches | 1 | 2 | 58 |
| Runs scored | – | 79 | 1,062 |
| Batting average | – | 19.75 | 24.69 |
| 100s/50s | – | 0/1 | 1/4 |
| Top score | – | 56 | 113* |
| Balls bowled | 42 | 48 | 1,290 |
| Wickets | 0 | 1 | 62 |
| Bowling average | – | 38.00 | 20.80 |
| 5 wickets in innings | 0 | 0 | 1 |
| 10 wickets in match | – | 0 | – |
| Best bowling | – | 1/38 | 5/17 |
| Catches/stumpings | 0/– | 1/– | 17/– |
- Source: CricketArchive, 10 March 2021

Claire Louise Whichcord (born 9 December 1972) is an English former cricketer who played as a right-handed batter and right-arm medium bowler. She appeared in one One Day International for England against The Netherlands at College Park, Dublin in the 1995 Women's European Cricket Cup. She bowled seven overs for 22 runs but did not take a wicket and did not bat. She played county cricket for Kent and club cricket for Old Stacians in the Southern Premier Cricket League. She is currently head teacher of Cliftonville Primary School in Margate.
