= Rachel Hardiman =

Irish cricketer

Personal information
- Full name: Rachel Ann Hardiman
- Born: 5 January 1961 (age 65); Dublin, Ireland
- Batting: Left-handed
- Bowling: Right-arm off break
- Role: Bowler

International information
- National side: Ireland
- ODI debut (cap 5): 28 June 1987 v Australia
- Last ODI: 19 July 1991 v Netherlands

Career statistics
Competition	WODI
Matches	9
Runs scored	35
Batting average	5.83
100s/50s	0/0
Top score	9
Balls bowled	222
Wickets	3
Bowling average	46.00
5 wickets in innings	0
10 wickets in match	0
Best bowling	2/14
Catches/stumpings	4/–
- Source: CricketArchive, 6 January 2017

Rachel Ann Hardiman (born 5 January 1961) is an Irish international cricketer who made her first appearance for the Ireland national side in 1987. Hardiman was born in Dublin. A right-arm off break bowler, she played nine One Day International matches.
