= Marieke Hommels =

Dutch cricketer

Personal information
- Born: unknown

International information
- National side: Netherlands
- ODI debut (cap 33): 18 July 1995 v England
- Last ODI: 20 July 1995 v Denmark

Career statistics
| Competition | WODI |
|---|---|
| Matches | 2 |
| Runs scored | 0 |
| Batting average | – |
| 100s/50s | – |
| Top score | – |
| Balls bowled | 66 |
| Wickets | 1 |
| Bowling average | 31.00 |
| 5 wickets in innings | 0 |
| 10 wickets in match | 0 |
| Best bowling | 1/14 |
| Catches/stumpings | 0/0 |
- Source: Cricinfo, 19 December 2017

Marieke Hommels is a former Dutch woman cricketer. She made her international debut for Netherlands in the 1995 Women's European Cricket Cup.
