= Anna Smith (cricketer) =

New Zealand cricketer (born 1978)

Personal information
- Full name: Anna Michelle Smith
- Born: 12 May 1978 (age 48); Dunedin, New Zealand
- Batting: Right-handed
- Role: Batter

International information
- National side: New Zealand (1996–2002)
- Only Test (cap 112): 4 July 1996 v England
- ODI debut (cap 75): 13 February 1999 v South Africa
- Last ODI: 21 February 2002 v Australia

Domestic team information
- Years: Team
- 1994/95–2006/07: Wellington
- 2002: Staffordshire

Career statistics
Competition	WTest	WODI	WFC	WLA
Matches	1	19	13	118
Runs scored	27	497	522	3,155
Batting average	27.00	33.13	26.10	31.23
100s/50s	0/0	0/3	2/2	3/18
Top score	27	91*	109	104
Catches/stumpings	1/–	3/–	6/–	27/–
- Source: CricketArchive, 19 April 2021

Anna Michelle Smith (née O'Leary; born 12 May 1978) is a New Zealand former cricketer who played as a right-handed batter. She appeared in 1 Test match and 19 One Day Internationals for New Zealand between 1996 and 2002. She played domestic cricket for Wellington, as well as spending one season with Staffordshire. Following her playing career, Smith has worked in marketing support.
