= Dorte Christensen =

Danish cricketer

Personal information
- Full name: Dorte Christensen
- Batting: Right-handed

International information
- National side: Denmark
- ODI debut (cap 24): 18 July 1995 v Ireland
- Last ODI: 21 July 1999 v Netherlands

Career statistics
Competition	WODI
Matches	11
Runs scored	53
Batting average	6.62
100s/50s	0/0
Top score	26
Balls bowled	6
Wickets	0
Bowling average	–
5 wickets in innings	0
10 wickets in match	0
Best bowling	–
Catches/stumpings	0/0
- Source: ESPNcricinfo, 28 September 2020

Dorte Christensen is a Danish former cricketer. She played eleven Women's One Day International matches for Denmark women's national cricket team between 1995 and 1999. She played domestic cricket for Herning Cricket Club.
