= Melissa Bulow =

Australian cricketer

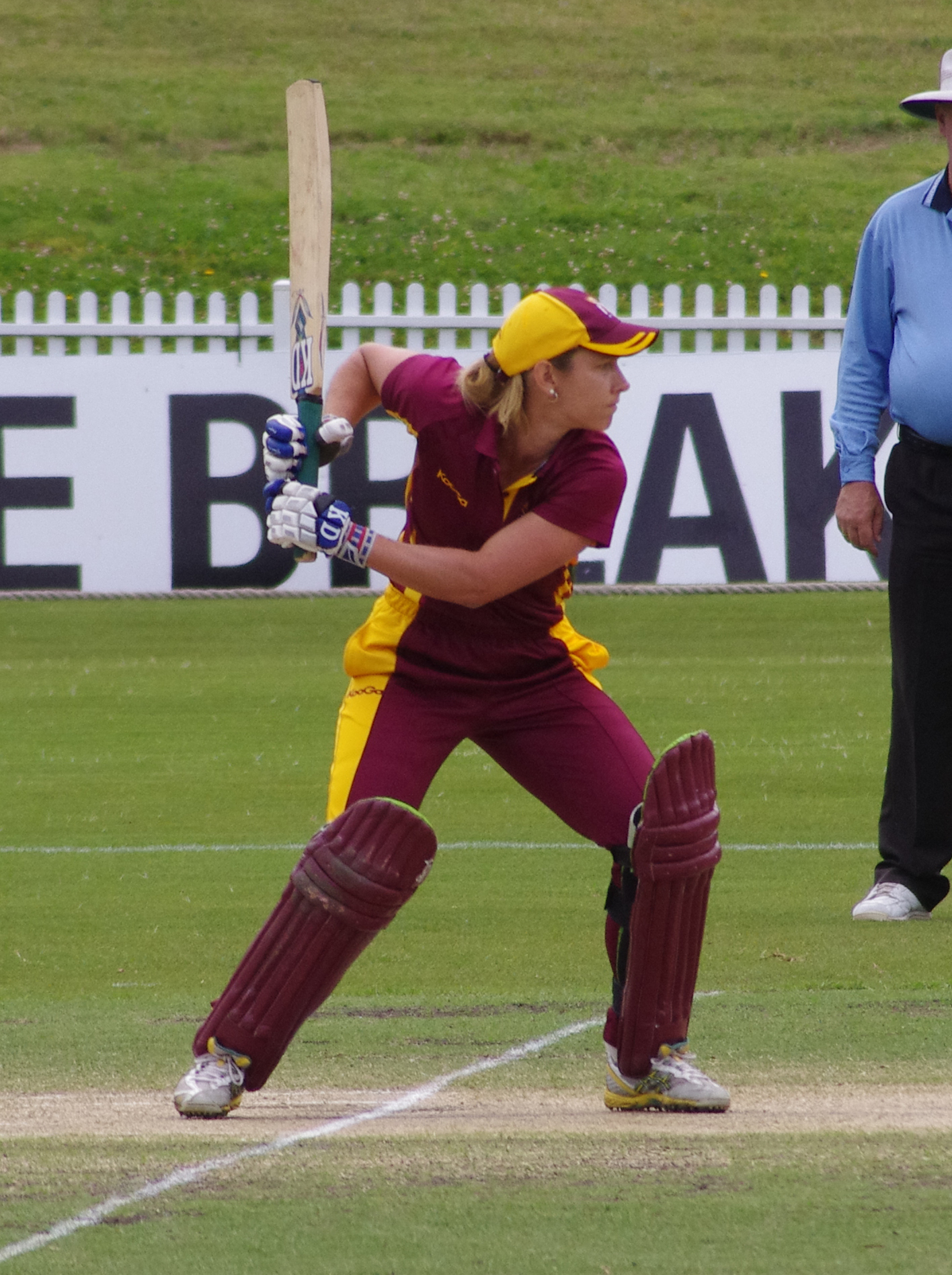

Personal information
- Full name: Melissa Jane Bulow
- Batting: Right-handed

International information
- National side: Australia
- Test debut (cap 149): 18 February 2006 v India
- Last Test: 15 February 2008 v England
- ODI debut (cap 98): 1 February 2003 v India
- Last ODI: 29 July 2007 v New Zealand
- T20I debut (cap 13): 18 October 2006 v New Zealand
- Last T20I: 19 July 2007 v New Zealand

Career statistics
Competition	WTest	WODI	WT20I
Matches	2	19	2
Runs scored	33	499	15
Batting average	11.00	26.26	7.50
100s/50s	0/0	0/6	0/0
Top score	20	85	11
Catches/stumpings	1/–	7/–	0/–
- Source: Cricinfo, 25 June 2014

Melissa Jane Bulow (born 13 June 1980) is an Australian cricketer. She has appeared in two Test matches, 19 One Day Internationals and 2 Twenty20 Internationals for her country.

She announced her retirement from international cricket in November 2012. Bulow is the 149th woman to play Test cricket for Australia, and the 98th woman to play One Day International cricket for Australia.
