= Judith Herbison =

Irish cricketer

Personal information
- Born: 26 December 1971 (age 54); Antrim, Northern Ireland
- Batting: Right-handed
- Bowling: Right-arm medium

International information
- National side: Ireland (1990–1997)
- ODI debut (cap 20): 18 July 1990 v Denmark
- Last ODI: 8 August 1997 v South Africa

Career statistics
Competition	ODI
Matches	25
Runs scored	75
Batting average	6.81
100s/50s	0/0
Top score	20
Balls bowled	1,434
Wickets	21
Bowling average	34.90
5 wickets in innings	0
10 wickets in match	0
Best bowling	3/29
Catches/stumpings	1/–
- Source: CricketArchive

Judith Herbison (born 26 December 1971) is a former Irish international cricketer who played for the Irish national team between 1990 and 1997. A right-handed medium-pace bowler, she played in 25 One Day International (ODI) matches, including at the 1993 World Cup.

Herbison was born in Antrim, Northern Ireland. Her senior debut for Ireland came at the 1990 European Cup, against Denmark. Against the same team at the 1991 European Championship, she took what were to be the best figures of her ODI career, 3/29 from 11 overs. At the 1993 World Cup in England, Herbison played in all seven of her team's matches, taking four wickets at an average of 56.75. Her best figures at that tournament were 2/25 against Australia. Herbison remained a regular in Irish sides for several more years, playing her final ODIs against South Africa in August 1997. At the 1995 European Cup, which Ireland hosted, she served as vice-captain to Miriam Grealey.
