= Karen Le Comber =

New Zealand cricketer (born 1969)

Personal information
- Full name: Karen Le Comber
- Born: 5 July 1969 (age 57); Christchurch, New Zealand
- Batting: Right-handed
- Bowling: Right-arm medium
- Role: Batter

International information
- National side: New Zealand (1996–1997)
- ODI debut (cap 67): 13 June 1996 v England
- Last ODI: 17 December 1997 v India

Domestic team information
- Years: Team
- 1987/88: Southern Districts
- 1991/92–1996/97: Canterbury

Career statistics
| Competition | WODI | WFC | WLA |
|---|---|---|---|
| Matches | 15 | 18 | 45 |
| Runs scored | 442 | 487 | 993 |
| Batting average | 44.20 | 23.19 | 26.13 |
| 100s/50s | 1/2 | 0/4 | 1/3 |
| Top score | 135* | 64 | 135* |
| Balls bowled | – | 102 | 90 |
| Wickets | – | 0 | 2 |
| Bowling average | – | – | 28.00 |
| 5 wickets in innings | – | 0 | 0 |
| 10 wickets in match | – | 0 | 0 |
| Best bowling | – | – | 2/14 |
| Catches/stumpings | 2/– | 5/– | 4/– |
- Source: CricketArchive, 23 April 2021

Karen Le Comber (born 5 July 1969) is a New Zealand former cricketer who played as a right-handed batter. She appeared in 15 One Day Internationals for New Zealand in 1996 and 1997. She mainly played domestic cricket for Canterbury, whilst also representing Southern Districts, Canterbury B and Pub Charities XI.
