= Sally Cooper =

Australian former cricket player

Personal information
- Full name: Sally Ann Cooper
- Born: 12 December 1978 (age 47); Melbourne, Victoria
- Batting: Left-handed
- Bowling: Right-arm medium

International information
- National side: Australia
- ODI debut (cap 94): 2 July 2001 v England
- Last ODI: 6 March 2002 v New Zealand

Domestic team information
- Years: Team
- 1997/98–2003/04: Queensland

Career statistics
Competition	ODI	List A
Matches	7	256
Runs scored	106	800
Batting average	21.20	16.66
100s/50s	0/7	0/4
Top score	85	85
Balls bowled	–	256
Wickets	–	9
Bowling average	–	20.66
5 wickets in innings	–	0
10 wickets in match	–	0
Best bowling	–	2/37
Catches/stumpings	0/–	12/–
- Source: Cricinfo, 7 August 2025

Sally Cooper (born 12 October 1978) is an Australian former cricketer. She played 42 matches for the Queensland Fire in the Women's National Cricket League. Cooper played seven One Day Internationals for the Australia national women's cricket team.
