= Babita Mandlik =

Indian cricketer (born 1981)

Personal information
- Full name: Babita Mandlik
- Born: 16 July 1981 (age 45); Indore, Madhya Pradesh, India
- Batting: Right-handed
- Bowling: Right-arm medium
- Role: Batter

International information
- National side: India (2003–2010)
- ODI debut (cap 71): 1 February 2003 v Australia
- Last ODI: 7 February 2003 v England
- T20I debut (cap 21): 4 March 2010 v England
- Last T20I: 6 March 2010 v England

Domestic team information
- Years: Team
- 2006/07–2008/09: Madhya Pradesh
- 2009/10–2012/13: Railways
- 2016/17: Delhi
- 2018/19–2019/20: Madhya Pradesh

Career statistics
Competition	WODI	WT20I	WFC	WLA
Matches	3	2	15	60
Runs scored	6	3	407	1,270
Batting average	3.00	3.00	23.94	28.86
100s/50s	0/0	0/0	0/3	0/6
Top score	5*	3	76	87*
Balls bowled	–	–	60	216
Wickets	–	–	1	10
Bowling average	–	–	25.00	13.30
5 wickets in innings	–	–	0	0
10 wickets in match	–	–	0	0
Best bowling	–	–	1/5	3/28
Catches/stumpings	0/–	0/–	12/–	23/–
- Source: CricketArchive, 17 August 2021

Babita Mandlik (born 16 July 1981) is an Indian cricketer who plays as a right-handed batter. She appeared in 3 One Day International and 2 Twenty20 Internationals for India from 2003 to 2010. She has played state cricket for Madhya Pradesh, Railways and Delhi.

Mandlik took a break from cricket to give birth to her only child, a daughter, before returning to the game.
