= Grainne Leahy =

Irish cricketer

Personal information
- Full name: Grainne Maire Leahy
- Born: 2 August 1966 (age 60); Dublin, Ireland
- Batting: Right handed
- Role: Top order batter

International information
- National side: Ireland
- ODI debut (cap 33): 5 August 1997 v South Africa
- Last ODI: 11 August 2001 v Scotland

Career statistics
Competition	WODI
Matches	11
Runs scored	55
Batting average	5.50
100s/50s	0/0
Top score	17
Catches/stumpings	3/–
- Source: CricketArchive, 6 January 2017

Grainne Maire Leahy née O'Brien (born 2 August 1966 in Dublin) is an Irish international cricketer who debuted for the Ireland national side in 1997. A top order batter, she played 11 One Day International matches.
