= Munster Cricket Union =

Irish cricket governing body

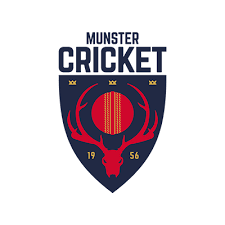
- Sport: Cricket
- Abbreviation: MCU
- Founded: 1956
- Affiliation: Cricket Ireland
- Regional affiliation: Munster
- President: Jack Filen
- Chairman: Richard Brewster
- CEO: Joe Moynihan
- Secretary: Ben Martin

Official website
- www.munstercricket.ie

The Munster Cricket Union is one of five provincial governing bodies for cricket in Ireland. Along with the Connacht, Northern, Leinster and North West unions, it makes up the Irish Cricket Union (now known as Cricket Ireland), the overall governing body of Irish cricket.

The Munster jurisdiction historically covered the traditional Irish provinces of Munster and Connacht in the Republic of Ireland, but since 2010 Connacht has had a separate union. The Union was founded in 1956. In 2005, there were 21 clubs fielding 32 teams affiliated to the union. It organises the Munster Senior League and Munster Senior Cup. In 2005, for the first time, a small league of five teams was organised in Connacht.

In March 2018 Munster Cricket agreed a lucrative sponsorship deal with international cricket equipment retailer All Rounder Cricket. The financial support given will be invested in further development of cricket and specifically grassroots cricket within the Union.

Munster Cricket is made up of a number of affiliated sports clubs throughout the province of Munster engaged in the playing of cricket. Its role is to promote, foster and organise the playing of cricket in the province. There are currently 41 affiliated clubs participating in senior and youth competitions as well as through a network of T20 and social cricket. The number of clubs is increasing with renewed interest in the sport in the fast growing areas around the hubs of Cork, Limerick, Waterford and Tralee.

The season runs from mid- April to mid- September with league and cup competitions organised for different groups. The main Adult Competitions are divided into three divisions, with each team also having the option to enter the Senior, Junior and Minor knockout cup competitions.

Because of the relative shortage of cricket grounds in Munster, many of the clubs field a number of teams, so you will find a match going on in most clubs every weekend and youth and social matches throughout the week.

Schools matches are played mainly in the urban and suburban areas of Cork and Limerick during the short summer term from after Easter to the end of May. For the remainder of the summer the clubs organize teams for young players, boys and girls, from the Under-9 age group.

Many praise the MCU for its "social cricket", which are often recreational than ranked sets of matches.

The MCU works closely with Cricket Ireland to continue to expand the gospel of cricket into new areas throughout the large catchment area that is Munster. The Union employs, with government support, a development officer who oversees the development of youth and schools cricket in the province. Munster Senior Cup and Division 1 winners also participate in the Irish Senior Cup while the remaining senior clubs compete in the National Cup.
