= Nicola Holt =

English cricketer

Personal information
- Full name: Nicola Holt
- Role: Bowler

International information
- National side: England (1996)
- ODI debut (cap 71): 16 June 1996 v New Zealand
- Last ODI: 18 June 1996 v New Zealand

Domestic team information
- Years: Team
- 1993–2004: Yorkshire

Career statistics
Competition	WODI	WFC	WLA
Matches	2	1	56
Runs scored	3	–	168
Batting average	1.50	–	9.88
100s/50s	0/0	–	0/0
Top score	2	–	38
Balls bowled	60	124	1,818
Wickets	0	3	44
Bowling average	–	16.66	21.59
5 wickets in innings	0	0	0
10 wickets in match	–	0	–
Best bowling	–	3/50	4/36
Catches/stumpings	0/–	1/–	13/–
- Source: CricketArchive, 10 March 2021

Nicola Holt is an English former cricketer who played as a bowler. She appeared in two One Day Internationals for England against New Zealand in June 1996. She played domestic cricket for Yorkshire.
