= Adele Spence =

Irish cricketer (born 1974)

Personal information
- Full name: Adele Audrey Ann Spence
- Born: 12 April 1974 (age 52); Dublin, Republic of Ireland
- Batting: Right-handed
- Bowling: Right-arm medium
- Role: Bowler

International information
- National side: Ireland
- Source: Cricinfo, 11 May 2016

Adele Audrey Ann Spence (born 12 April 1974) is an Irish cricketer who has played eight women's one-day internationals. She is a right-hand bat and bowls right-arm offbreak. She was born at Dublin in 1974.
