= Michelle Lynch =

New Zealand cricketer

Personal information
- Full name: Michelle Louise Lynch
- Born: 16 October 1975 (age 51); Auckland, New Zealand
- Batting: Right-handed
- Role: Wicket-keeper

International information
- National side: New Zealand (2003)
- ODI debut (cap 93): 26 January 2003 v Australia
- Last ODI: 16 December 2003 v India

Domestic team information
- Years: Team
- 1995/96–2009/10: Auckland

Career statistics
Competition	WODI	WFC	WLA	WT20
Matches	6	1	68	9
Runs scored	105	8	1,237	98
Batting average	17.50	8.00	20.27	10.88
100s/50s	0/0	0/0	1/4	0/0
Top score	29	8	150*	31
Balls bowled	–	–	6	–
Wickets	–	–	0	–
Bowling average	–	–	–	–
5 wickets in innings	–	–	0	–
10 wickets in match	–	–	0	–
Best bowling	–	–	–	–
Catches/stumpings	0/–	0/–	18/0	2/–
- Source: CricketArchive, 18 April 2021

Michelle Louise Lynch (born 16 October 1975) is a New Zealand former cricketer who played as a right-handed batter, and occasional wicket-keeper. She appeared in 6 One Day Internationals for New Zealand in 2003. She played domestic cricket for Auckland, and captained them during the 2002–03 season.
