= Heidi Jensen (cricketer) =

Danish cricketer

Personal information
- Full name: Heidi Jensen

International information
- National side: Denmark
- ODI debut (cap 14): 18 July 1990 v Ireland
- Last ODI: 20 July 1991 v England

Career statistics
Competition	WODI
Matches	5
Runs scored	13
Batting average	3.25
100s/50s	0/0
Top score	6
Balls bowled	144
Wickets	3
Bowling average	16.66
5 wickets in innings	0
10 wickets in match	0
Best bowling	2/13
Catches/stumpings	0/–
- Source: ESPNcricinfo, 27 September 2020

Heidi Jensen is a Danish former cricketer. She played five Women's One Day International matches for the Denmark women's national cricket team between 1990 and 1991.
