= Lancashire and Cheshire Women cricket team =

English women's cricket team

Lancashire and Cheshire Women
Personnel
- Captain: Allyson Byrne

Team information
- Founded: Unknown First recorded match: 1930
- Dissolved: 1997

History
- WAC wins: 0
- WCC wins: 0

The Lancashire and Cheshire Women's cricket team was the women's representative cricket team for the historic counties of Lancashire and Cheshire. They competed in the Women's Area Championship from 1980 to 1996 and in the Women's County Championship in 1997, after which they were replaced by individual teams representing Lancashire and Cheshire.

== History ==
Lancashire and Cheshire Women played their first recorded match in 1930, in which they lost to Durham by 16 runs. The side went on to play various one-off matches, against various county and touring sides, before they joined the Women's Area Championship in 1980. Lancashire and Cheshire were one of the weaker sides in the Area Championship, with their best finishes coming in 1985, when they reached the Quarter-Finals, and in 1993, when they finished fifth. In 1997, they played in the inaugural Women's County Championship season, finishing 2nd in Division Two. The following season, however, the team was disbanded and replaced by individual sides representing Lancashire and Cheshire.

== Players ==
=== Notable players ===
Players who played for Lancashire and Cheshire and played internationally are listed below, in order of first international appearance (noted in brackets):

- (England) Avril Starling (1982)
- (England) Carole Hodges (1982)
- (England) Lesley Cooke (1986)
- (England) Ruth Lupton (1995)
- (England) Laura Newton (1997)
- (England) Sarah Collyer (1998)

== Seasons ==
=== Women's County Championship ===
Season	Division	League standings								Notes
Season	Division	P	W	L	T	A/C	BP	Pts	Pos	Notes
1997	Division 2	5	3	2	0	0	39	75	2nd	

== See also ==
- Lancashire Women cricket team
- Cheshire Women cricket team
- List of defunct English women's cricket teams
