= Karen Young (cricketer) =

New Zealand-born Irish cricketer (born 1968)

Personal information
- Full name: Karen Nichole Young
- Born: 6 December 1968 (age 57); Auckland, New Zealand
- Batting: Right-handed
- Bowling: Right-arm medium
- Role: All-rounder

International information
- National side: Ireland
- Only Test (cap 10): 30 July 2000 v Pakistan
- ODI debut (cap 42): 23 July 2000 v Pakistan
- Last ODI: 23 July 2003 v Pakistan

Career statistics
| Competition | WTest | WODI | WLA |
|---|---|---|---|
| Matches | 1 | 19 | 20 |
| Runs scored | 58 | 289 | 292 |
| Batting average | 58.00 | 17.00 | 16.22 |
| 100s/50s | 0/1 | 1/0 | 1/0 |
| Top score | 58 | 120 | 120 |
| Balls bowled | – | 198 | 198 |
| Wickets | – | 3 | 3 |
| Bowling average | – | 46.00 | 46.00 |
| 5 wickets in innings | – | 0 | 0 |
| 10 wickets in match | – | 0 | 0 |
| Best bowling | – | 1/15 | 1/15 |
| Catches/stumpings | 1/– | 2/– | 2/– |
- Source: CricketArchive, 30 November 2021

Karen Nichole Young (born 6 June 1968) is a New Zealand-born Irish former cricketer who played as a right-handed batter and right-arm medium bowler. She appeared in one Test match and 19 One Day Internationals for Ireland between 2000 and 2003. She scored 58 in her only Test match, against Pakistan, as well as scoring 120 in an ODI in the same series.
