= Shona Seawright =

Irish cricketer (born 1977)

Personal information
- Full name: Shona Doey Seawright
- Born: 27 February 1977 (age 49); Ballymoney, County Antrim, Northern Ireland
- Batting: Right-handed
- Bowling: Right-arm medium
- Role: Wicket-keeper

International information
- National side: Ireland

Career statistics
| Competition | WODI |
|---|---|
| Matches | 7 |
| Runs scored | 59 |
| Batting average | 14.75 |
| 100s/50s | 0/0 |
| Top score | 30 |
| Catches/stumpings | 0/0 |
- Source: Cricinfo, 28 December 2017

Shona Doey Seawright (born 27 February 1977) is a former Irish woman cricketer. She has appeared in 7 Women's ODIs representing Irish cricket team. She was also a member of the Irish cricket team in the 1995 Women's European Cricket Cup.
