= Sarah-Jane Cook =

English cricketer (born 1966)

Personal information
- Full name: Sarah-Jane Cook
- Born: 19 August 1966 (age 60)
- Role: Bowler

International information
- National side: England (1990–1996)
- Only Test (cap 121): 24 June 1996 v New Zealand
- ODI debut (cap 59): 17 August 1990 v Ireland
- Last ODI: 13 June 1996 v New Zealand

Domestic team information
- Years: Team
- 1983–1999: Sussex

Career statistics
Competition	WTest	WODI	WLA
Matches	1	4	69
Runs scored	2	–	652
Batting average	2.00	–	16.30
100s/50s	0/0	–	0/1
Top score	2	–	59
Balls bowled	168	144	3,673
Wickets	0	0	69
Bowling average	–	–	25.81
5 wickets in innings	–	–	1
10 wickets in match	–	–	0
Best bowling	–	–	5/28
Catches/stumpings	0/–	1/–	10/–
- Source: CricketArchive, 13 February 2021

Sarah-Jane Cook is an English cricketer and former member of the England women's cricket team She was born in 1966 and played one Test match, against New Zealand, and four one day internationals.
