= Sarah Collyer =

English cricketer

Personal information
- Full name: Sarah Victoria Collyer
- Born: 3 October 1980 (age 46); Birkenhead, Merseyside, England
- Batting: Right-handed
- Bowling: Right-arm medium
- Role: All-rounder

International information
- National side: England (1998–2003)
- Test debut (cap 125): 6 August 1998 v Australia
- Last Test: 22 February 2003 v Australia
- ODI debut (cap 75): 12 July 1998 v Australia
- Last ODI: 7 February 2003 v India

Domestic team information
- Years: Team
- 1995–1997: Lancashire and Cheshire
- 1998–2000: Cheshire
- 2001–2002: Somerset
- 2002/03: Western Australia
- 2005: Cheshire

Career statistics
Competition	WTest	WODI	WFC	WLA
Matches	7	25	9	99
Runs scored	155	277	244	1,875
Batting average	17.22	16.29	22.18	22.05
100s/50s	0/0	0/0	0/1	1/8
Top score	37	39	53	113
Balls bowled	1,276	1,287	1,522	4,055
Wickets	8	24	12	74
Bowling average	50.62	29.33	38.83	24.75
5 wickets in innings	0	1	0	1
10 wickets in match	0	0	0	0
Best bowling	2/17	5/32	3/28	5/32
Catches/stumpings	4/–	5/–	6/0	20/–
- Source: CricketArchive, 14 February 2021

Sarah Victoria Collyer (born 3 October 1980) is an English former cricketer who played as an all-rounder. She was a right-arm medium bowler and right-handed batter. She appeared in 7 Test matches and 25 One Day Internationals for England between 1998 and 2003. She played domestic cricket for Lancashire and Cheshire, Cheshire, Somerset and Western Australia.

== Early life ==
Collyer was born on 3 October 1980 in Birkenhead, Merseyside.

== Domestic career ==
Collyer made her county cricket debut for Lancashire and Cheshire in 1995. She later played for Cheshire and Somerset. She also appeared for Western Australia in the 2002–03 Women's National Cricket League. She scored a century for Cheshire against Hampshire in 1998.

== International career ==
Collyer made her debut for England at the age of 17 in a One Day International against Australia on 12 July 1998. She made her Test debut a month later, taking one wicket against Australia.

Her best performance for England came during the 2000 Women's Cricket World Cup, when she took five wickets against the Netherlands.

In 2002, Collyer and Kathryn Leng were temporarily removed from the side when they went on "an unauthorised holiday to Tenerife".

Collyer returned to the England team in early 2003, but after a back problem forced her to undergo surgery, she did not play for England again. Her final international appearance was a Test match against Australia in February 2003. She ended her international career with 24 wickets at an average of 29.33 in ODI cricket and 8 wickets at an average of 50.62 in Test cricket.
