= Nikki Squire =

Irish cricketer (born 1967)

Personal information
- Full name: Nikki Helen Squire
- Born: 2 November 1967 (age 59); Dublin, Ireland
- Batting: Right-handed
- Role: Batsman

International information
- National side: Ireland (1991–2001)
- ODI debut (cap 24): 16 July 1991 v England
- Last ODI: 12 August 2001 v England

Career statistics
Competition	ODI
Matches	37
Runs scored	291
Batting average	10.77
100s/50s	0/0
Top score	30
Catches/stumpings	5/–
- Source: CricketArchive

Nikki Helen Squire (born 2 November 1967) is a former Irish international cricketer who played for the Irish national team between 1991 and 2001. She played in 37 One Day International (ODI) matches, including at the 1993, 1997, and 2000 World Cups, and briefly captained the team.

Squire was born in Dublin, and educated at Wesley College. Her debut for Ireland came at the 1991 European Championship in the Netherlands, and two years later she played in four of Ireland's seven matches at the 1993 World Cup. A right-handed middle or lower-order batsman, Squire made her highest ODI score in July 1996, scoring 30 runs from 88 balls against New Zealand. Despite consistently low scores, she remained a regular for Ireland throughout the 1990s, making appearances for Ireland at the 1997 and 2000 World Cups. For the 2001 season, Squire was named Ireland's captain, skippering the side in a three-match ODI series against Australia and later at the 2001 European Championship. She retired from international cricket after the latter tournament, finishing with a career batting average of just 10.77. Squire's club cricket was played for Railway Union.
