= Sportpark Koninklijke HFC =

Cricket ground in Haarlem, Netherlands

Coordinates: 52°21′48.58″N 04°37′11.14″E

Ground information
- Location: Haarlem, Netherlands
- Establishment: 1895 (first recorded match)
- Capacity: Unknown

International information
- First WODI: 8 August 1984: Netherlands v New Zealand
- Last WODI: 22 July 2003: Netherlands v West Indies
- As of 3 September 2020; Source: Ground profile

Sportpark Koninklijke HFC is a cricket ground in Haarlem, the Netherlands. The first recorded match on the ground came in 1895 when the Haarlem played English club Leicester Ivanhoe. The ground has a long association of holding touring English sides, with the Free Foresters regular visitors, along with other touring English county sides, though none of these matches were rated as first-class. The ground later held seven matches in the ICC Trophy. Between 1984 and 2003 ten Women's One Day Internationals were played on the ground.

The ground is used by Rood en Wit Cricket Club.
