= Barbara McDonald =

Irish cricketer

Personal information
- Full name: Barbara Mary McDonald
- Born: 28 May 1972 (age 54); Waterford, Ireland
- Batting: Right-handed
- Bowling: Right-arm medium-fast
- Role: Bowler

International information
- National side: Ireland (1993–2005)
- Only Test (cap 5): 30 July 2000 v Pakistan
- ODI debut (cap 28): 28 July 1993 v Netherlands
- Last ODI: 19 August 2005 v Netherlands

Career statistics
Competition	WTest	WODI	WLA
Matches	1	57	62
Runs scored	—	106	139
Batting average	—	4.41	5.34
100s/50s	—	0/0	0/0
Top score	—	22*	22*
Balls bowled	156	2,876	3,134
Wickets	4	54	61
Bowling average	7.00	26.75	25.50
5 wickets in innings	0	0	0
10 wickets in match	0	0	0
Best bowling	3/9	4/8	4/8
Catches/stumpings	1/–	10/–	10/–
- Source: CricketArchive, 1 December 2021

Barbara Mary McDonald (born 28 May 1972) is an Irish former cricketer who played as a right-arm pace bowler. She appeared in one Test match and 57 One Day Internationals (ODIs) for Ireland between 1993 and 2005, including appearing at the 1993, 1997, 2000, and 2005 World Cups.

McDonald was born in Waterford, but played her club cricket for Malahide, in County Dublin. She made her Irish senior debut at the age of 21, playing twice in the 1993 World Cup in England, against the Netherlands and the West Indies. Within a few years, she had established herself as one of Ireland's opening bowlers, notably taking 2/40 and 3/17 in consecutive matches against the touring South Africans during the 1997 season. At the 1997 World Cup in India, McDonald took five wickets from five matches, behind only Catherine O'Neill for Ireland. Her best performance came in the game against Denmark that secured her team's place in the quarter-finals, when she took 3/12 from five overs.

In July 2000, Pakistan visited Ireland to play five ODIs and a single Test match, the latter of which was Ireland's first and only appearance at that level. In the third ODI, McDonald took career-best figures of 4/8 from 6.4 overs, including the last four wickets to fall. She continued her good form when the Test began the next day, taking the first three Pakistani wickets to fall and finishing with figures of 3/9 from 12 overs. She added 1/19 in the second innings as her team won by an innings and 54 runs. However, at the World Cup in New Zealand later in the year, McDonald had less success, taking only three wickets from seven matches.

McDonald had her greatest personal success as a player at the 2003 IWCC Trophy in the Netherlands, where she was named player of the tournament. Her five matches had yielded 11 wickets at an average of only 5.54, which included figures of 4/13 against the West Indies, 3/10 against Japan, and 2/13 against the Netherlands. Ireland were undefeated, and consequently qualified for the 2005 World Cup in South Africa. Now aged 32, McDonald remained one of her team's opening bowlers, and again played every match, finishing as equal leading wicket-taker with Heather Whelan. She played her final international matches later in the year, at the 2005 edition of the European Championship. McDonald finished her career as Ireland's leading wicket-taker in ODIs, although she has since been overtaken by Isobel Joyce.
