= Cricket Ireland =

Governing body of cricket in Republic of Ireland and Northern Ireland

- Sport: Cricket
- Jurisdiction: Ireland; Northern Ireland
- Abbreviation: CI
- Founded: 1923; 103 years ago
- Affiliation: International Cricket Council
- Affiliation date: 1993; 33 years ago
- Regional affiliation: ICC Europe
- Affiliation date: 1997; 29 years ago
- Location: Clontarf, Dublin; Malahide, Dublin; Stormont, Belfast; Bready, Derry
- President: Bryan O'Donnell
- Chairman: Brian MacNeice
- CEO: Sarah Keane
- Men's coach: Gary Wilson
- Women's coach: Lloyd Tennant
- Sponsor: ITW Consulting, Certa, Macron, Fáilte Solar, DMG Media, Evoke, Ulster University
- Replaced: Previously called Irish Cricket Union

Official website
- www.cricketireland.ie
- (Ireland)

Cricket Ireland (formerly the Irish Cricket Union) is the national governing body for cricket on the island of Ireland (both the Republic of Ireland and Northern Ireland), and oversees the national men's and women's cricket teams. It also organises the men's Inter-Provincial Series (which includes the Inter-Provincial Championship, Inter-Provincial Cup and Inter-Provincial Trophy), the women's Super Series, and three All-Ireland club competitions: Irish Senior Cup, National Cup and the All-Ireland T20 Cup. It achieved Test status for women in 2000, and for men in 2017 when it was made a Full Member of the ICC in June 2017.

== History ==
An early forerunner of the Irish Cricket Union was formed in 1890, though its only function was to select the Irish international team. There is debate about what year should mark the official start of the Irish Cricket Union - in 1923 an embryonic entity was set up, but only two provincial unions (of four) were involved - namely the Leinster Cricket Union and the Northern Cricket Union. In 1927, all four provincial unions signed on (the Munster Cricket Union and the North West Cricket Union joined to make it four), so that year is considered a more appropriate anniversary. Its powers initially were strictly limited and it was reconstituted in 1933. Today, there are five provincial unions with the Connacht Cricket Union becoming a recognised provincial union in 2025.

Ireland was accepted as an Associate Member of the International Cricket Council on 6 July 1993.

In common with a number of other Ireland sporting governing bodies, the Union represents all of the island of Ireland, rather than just the Republic of Ireland. In common with its counterparts for rugby union and field hockey, the organisation, therefore, does not use the Irish tricolour, but instead employs its own flag.

Ireland was initially among the teams in Division 1 of Associate Members of International Cricket Council who have One Day International and T20 International status.

Ireland's greatest cricketing success to date was to reach the Super 8 of the 2007 Cricket World Club following victory over Pakistan and a tied game with Zimbabwe in the groups stages. The most significant, and most publicised, success in a one-off match occurred four years later, with a three-wicket victory over England in the 2011 Cricket World Cup in which Kevin O'Brien scored the World Cup's fastest ever century and Ireland set a World Cup record with by "chasing" 327 runs. During 2007 World Cup Ireland had major success with their victory by three wickets over Pakistan in a 2007 Cricket World Cup group match.

The victory over Pakistan in 2007 was overshadowed by the sudden death of the Pakistan Coach Bob Woolmer that night. Ireland also managed to beat the West Indies in their prime in 1968 at Sion Mills, 25 years before Ireland were accepted as an associate by the ICC.

The Irish Cricket Union was formally dissolved and then formed afresh as a limited company on 3 February 2008, at its annual general meeting.

After success on the international stage, Cricket Ireland applied for Full Membership from the International Cricket Council. Ireland won the ICC World Twenty20 Qualifier 2008 and 2009 ICC World Cup Qualifier and qualified for 2009 World Twenty20 and 2011 Cricket World Cup. Full membership would allow Ireland to be a permanent One Day International and eventually grant them Test status.

In August 2011, Cricket Ireland announced its plans to put in place a first-class structure, which is a major achievement for the nation on their path to gaining Test status.

In 2012, Cricket Ireland announced that it had found the pathway to Test status for their tremendously successful men's team by 2020. Targets include an increase in the number of people playing the game in Ireland to 50,000, reaching eighth in the world rankings and establishing a domestic first-class structure. A number of commercial deals have been secured, allowing Ireland to unveil their strategic plan to 2015 and target their ultimate ambition of securing Test status.

Cricket Ireland has offered a record 23 professional contracts to players, in three categories, for 2012, a development Phil Simmons says is vital for their continued improvement. Simmons, the Ireland coach, has also agreed a two-year extension to his contract which will take him through to at least the end of Ireland's World Cup qualifying campaign late next year.

Initiatives to swell participation numbers to 50,000 will include the establishment of regional academies; a Get into Cricket scheme which will seek to attract six to 12-year-olds to take up the game in clubs and schools; a Better Clubs Initiative, which will encourage clubs to improve their facilities; and the Cricket Ireland national awards which will recognise contributions ranging from players to volunteers. In another sign of the growing popularity of cricket in Ireland, the Irish provided a record 23 national contracts for the 2012 season, which also included not only the senior and regular members of the squad, but also fringe players. The contracts, for the first time, were divided into sections: Category A, Category B, and Category C (for fringe players).

In June 2017, the ICC awarded Full Membership to Ireland and Afghanistan, allowing them the opportunity to play Test matches.

== Provincial bodies ==
- Leinster Cricket Union
- Munster Cricket Union
- Northern Cricket Union
- North West Cricket Union
- Connacht Cricket Union

== Objectives ==
Vision to 2020 - Ireland a Test nation

- To set out a series of stretching goals including increasing the number of participants in the game to 50,000
- Reaching 8th in the world ODI rankings by 2015
- Establishing a domestic first-class structure
- Reinforcing cricket as the 4th-most major sport in Ireland

== Grass roots initiatives ==
Reflecting the rising popularity of the game in Ireland, Cricket Ireland committed to developing the grass roots of the sport over the next four years. New plans were unveiled to provide a significant boost to the domestic game with a series of initiatives designed to strengthen the game on the island and help achieve the ambitious target of 50,000 participants by 2015.

The initiatives include:-

- The 'Get into Cricket Scheme' - a major new programme targeting schools and clubs encouraging 6-to-12-year-olds to take up the game for the first time.
- The National Cup – a new domestic national club competition for clubs not already competing in the Bob Kerr Irish Senior Cup. This provides 32 new clubs with the chance to compete for an All Ireland title and the opportunity to play cricket outside of their local area.
- The 'Better Clubs Initiative' – an innovative programme supporting local clubs across the country to improve their facilities. This programme is a volunteering initiative aimed at encouraging local cricket supporters, their friend and families to undertake work to improve the facilities at their local club houses and grounds.
- The Cricket Ireland National Awards – a major awards event recognising players, coaches, volunteers, groundsmen, officials and clubs for the contribution they make to the game in Ireland. This will be an annual event starting in 2012.
- The establishment of Regional Academies to develop and foster the young talent from the ages of 15 to 19 and ensure a pipeline of players for International teams.
- The re-launch of the Inter-Provincial Championship as a precursor to setting up a first-class domestic playing infrastructure in Ireland.

Source: Official Website

== See also ==
- Cricket in Ireland
- Irish Cricket Awards
- Sport in Ireland
- List of Irish cricketers
