= Caitriona Beggs =

Irish cricketer (born 1977)

Personal information
- Full name: Caitriona Mary Beggs
- Born: 15 July 1977 (age 49); Dublin, Ireland
- Batting: Right-handed
- Bowling: Right-arm medium
- Role: Batter; occasional wicket-keeper

International information
- National side: Ireland (1995–2008)
- Only Test (cap 1): 30 July 2000 v Pakistan
- ODI debut (cap 61): 20 July 1995 v England
- Last ODI: 24 February 2008 v Netherlands

Domestic team information
- Years: Team
- 2007/08: Northern Districts

Career statistics
Competition	WTest	WODI	WLA
Matches	1	61	71
Runs scored	68	1,217	1,439
Batting average	–	24.83	25.24
100s/50s	0/1	0/7	0/8
Top score	68*	78*	79
Balls bowled	–	246	270
Wickets	–	3	3
Bowling average	–	81.33	89.00
5 wickets in innings	–	0	0
10 wickets in match	–	0	0
Best bowling	–	1/7	1/7
Catches/stumpings	0/–	11/0	13/0
- Source: CricketArchive, 1 December 2021

Caitriona Mary Beggs (born 15 July 1977) is an Irish former cricketer who played as a right-handed batter and occasional wicket-keeper. She appeared in one Test match and 61 One Day Internationals (ODIs) for Ireland between 1995 and 2008. She also played two matches for Northern Districts in 2008.

With 1,217 runs, she is Ireland's third-highest run-scorer in ODIs. In Ireland's only Test match, Beggs top-scored in her side's only innings with 68* as Ireland won by an innings and 54 runs.
