= Catherine O'Neill (cricketer) =

New Zealand-born Irish cricketer (born 1970)

Personal information
- Full name: Catherine O'Neill
- Born: 28 June 1970 (age 56); Hamilton, Waikato, New Zealand
- Batting: Right-handed
- Bowling: Right-arm off break
- Role: All-rounder

International information
- National side: Ireland (1993–2003)
- Only Test (cap 8): 30 July 2000 v Pakistan
- ODI debut (cap 26): 20 July 1996 v New Zealand
- Last ODI: 26 July 2003 v Scotland

Domestic team information
- Years: Team
- 1992/93: Auckland
- 2003/04: Northern Districts

Career statistics
Competition	WTest	WODI	WLA
Matches	1	41	53
Runs scored	–	438	494
Batting average	–	16.84	14.96
100s/50s	–	0/0	0/0
Top score	–	45	45
Balls bowled	166	2,176	2,712
Wickets	6	45	56
Bowling average	4.50	22.84	23.64
5 wickets in innings	0	0	0
10 wickets in match	0	0	0
Best bowling	3/12	4/10	4/10
Catches/stumpings	0/–	6/–	7/–
- Source: CricketArchive, 30 November 2021

Catherine O'Neill (born 28 June 1970) is a New Zealand-born Irish former cricketer who played as a right-arm off break bowler and right-handed batter. She appeared in one Test match and 41 One Day Internationals for Ireland between 1993 and 2003. She also spent a season apiece with Auckland and Northern Districts.
