= Kathryn Leng =

English cricketer (born 1973)

Personal information
- Full name: Kathryn Maria Leng
- Born: 28 September 1973 (age 53); Pudsey, Yorkshire, England
- Batting: Left-handed
- Bowling: Right-arm leg break
- Role: All-rounder

International information
- National side: England (1995–2003)
- Test debut (cap 116): 17 November 1995 v India
- Last Test: 22 February 2003 v Australia
- ODI debut (cap 65): 18 July 1995 v Netherlands
- Last ODI: 7 February 2003 v India

Domestic team information
- Years: Team
- 1989–2004: Yorkshire

Career statistics
Competition	WTest	WODI	WFC	WLA
Matches	12	56	13	160
Runs scored	436	711	436	2,762
Batting average	24.22	15.80	22.94	21.92
100s/50s	1/0	0/1	1/0	0/13
Top score	144	80	144	91
Balls bowled	1,429	1,461	1,531	4,904
Wickets	17	33	19	120
Bowling average	39.76	29.57	37.84	23.94
5 wickets in innings	0	0	0	0
10 wickets in match	0	0	0	0
Best bowling	3/49	4/31	3/49	4/31
Catches/stumpings	2/–	14/–	2/–	45/–
- Source: CricketArchive, 14 February 2021

Kathryn Maria Leng (born 28 September 1973 in Pudsey) is a former English cricketer for England Women, Yorkshire and Bradford/Leeds UCCE.

Born in Pudsey, Yorkshire, Leng was U-19 captain for England Women and first played for the senior squad in a One-Day International in 1995. In April 1999, Leng played for Yorkshire Bank first team in the Bradford Cricket League, the first woman to play in that league, and became the first woman to play inter UCCE cricket in 2001. She was dropped from England's one-day squad in 2002 after taking an unauthorized holiday in Tenerife. Although she was recalled for the 2003 tour of Australia, her last Test match was in February 2003. Her highest Test score came in 1996, with 144 against New Zealand, which is the record for the highest individual score by any cricketer when batting at number 7 position or lower in Women's Test history.
