= Saibh Young =

Irish cricketer (born 1967)

Personal information
- Full name: Saibh Anna Young
- Born: 5 September 1967 (age 59); Dublin, Ireland
- Batting: Right-handed
- Bowling: Right-arm medium
- Role: Bowler

International information
- National side: Ireland (1990–2001)
- Only Test (cap 11): 30 July 2000 v Pakistan
- ODI debut (cap 23): 20 July 1990 v England
- Last ODI: 12 August 2001 v England

Career statistics
Competition	WTest	WODI	WLA
Matches	1	36	37
Runs scored	–	196	210
Batting average	–	8.90	9.13
100s/50s	–	0/0	0/0
Top score	–	16	16
Balls bowled	102	1,380	1,440
Wickets	0	32	33
Bowling average	–	28.62	28.93
5 wickets in innings	0	0	0
10 wickets in match	0	0	0
Best bowling	–	4/24	4/24
Catches/stumpings	0/–	7/–	10/–
- Source: CricketArchive, 30 November 2021

Saibh Anna Young (born 5 September 1967) is an Irish former cricketer who played as a right-arm medium bowler. She appeared in one Test match and 36 One Day Internationals for Ireland between 1990 and 2001. She took a hat-trick in an ODI against England in 2001.
