= Miriam Grealey =

Irish cricketer (born 1965)

Personal information
- Full name: Miriam Elizabeth Grealey
- Born: 27 December 1965 (age 60); Donegal, Ireland
- Batting: Right-handed
- Bowling: Right-arm off break
- Role: All-rounder

International information
- National side: Ireland (1987–2005)
- Only Test (cap 2): 30 July 2000 v Pakistan
- ODI debut (cap 4): 28 June 1987 v Australia
- Last ODI: 1 April 2005 v Australia

Career statistics
Competition	WTest	WODI	WLA
Matches	1	79	81
Runs scored	16	1,412	1,428
Batting average	16.00	23.14	23.03
100s/50s	0/0	1/5	1/5
Top score	16	101	101
Balls bowled	–	2,803	2,887
Wickets	–	38	42
Bowling average	–	44.71	41.02
5 wickets in innings	–	0	0
10 wickets in match	–	0	0
Best bowling	–	2/5	4/16
Catches/stumpings	0/–	13/–	13/–
- Source: CricketArchive, 1 December 2021

Miriam Elizabeth Grealey (born 27 December 1965) is an Irish former cricketer who played as an all-rounder, batting right-handed and bowling right-arm off break. She appeared in one Test match and 79 One Day Internationals for Ireland between 1987 and 2005. She was the first woman to score 1,000 runs in ODIs for Ireland.

Her ODI high score came in 2000, when she hit 101 against Pakistan. In 2017, she was one of two women inducted into the Cricket Writers' Hall of Fame. She is also an Honorary Life Member of the MCC, the first Irish citizen to be so honoured.
