= List of Irish first-class cricketers =

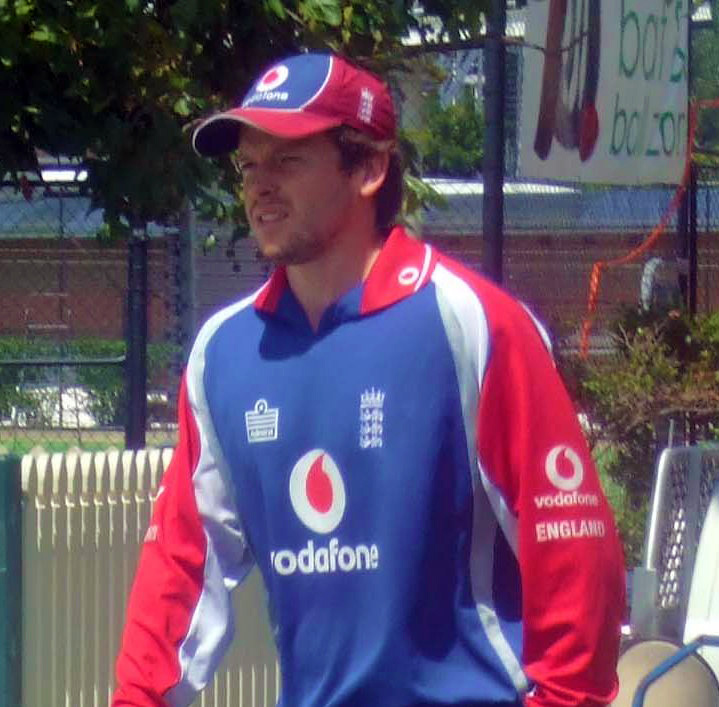
Ed Joyce (pictured) has scored more first-class runs (18,461) than any other Irishman to play at first-class level.

First-class cricket matches are those between international teams or the highest standard of domestic teams in which teams have two innings each. Generally, matches are eleven players a side but there have been exceptions. Today, all matches must be scheduled to have at least three days' duration. The Ireland cricket team first played first-class cricket in 1902 against W. G. Grace's London County. From 1902, Ireland played 159 first-class matches prior to their elevation to Test status in June 2017. The majority of these matches were the annual Ireland v Scotland fixture, but others saw touring teams visiting Ireland during tours of England to play one first-class match against Ireland, normally a College Park, Dublin. Occasionally teams based in Ireland (or touring abroad) were afforded first-class status. These include Dublin University, the Gentlemen of Ireland, and Woodbrook Club and Ground, which all heavily featured Irish cricketers. Following the Irish War of Independence and the ban by the Gaelic Athletic Association in 1901 on playing "foreign", in practice, British, games, cricket went into decline across Ireland. However, it was able to survive in its Dublin, Belfast and North-West heartlands. The ban on playing "foreign" games was lifted in 1970, and cricket began to recover. Owing to Ireland's non-membership, and later associate membership of the International Cricket Council, many of the top Irish cricketers sought first-class experience in English county cricket, including some, such as Sir Tim O'Brien and Eoin Morgan playing Test cricket for England. The annual Ireland v Scotland fixture came to an end in 2000, with Ireland playing in the ICC Intercontinental Cup from 2004 to 2017, winning the competition on four occasions. With Test status granted to Ireland in 2017, for the first time matches in Inter-Provincial Championship had first-class status.

Prior to this, 391 Irishman had played first-class cricket from 1790–2017. Tim O'Brien has made more appearances in first-class cricket than any other Irishman, with 266. Ed Joyce has scored more runs at first-class level than any other Irishman, scoring 18,461 runs in a first-class career that lasted from 1997 to 2018, he also has the highest score by an Irishman with 255. The highest batting average by an Irishman who has played over twenty matches belongs to Andrew White, who averaged 48.42 from 34 matches. Tim Murtagh has taken more wickets at first-class level than any other Irishman, with 959. James Boucher has the best bowling average for players who have taken over fifty wickets, his 168 wickets coming at an average of 14.04 apiece. Francis Fee has the best bowling figures in an innings by an Irishman, with 9/26. Niall O'Brien has the most wicket-keeping dismissals among Irishmen, with 492 catches and 48 stumpings.

This list contains only Irish born players, or those who have emigrated to Ireland and qualified to play for Ireland as Irish citizens. The list covers the years 1790 to March 2017, just prior to Ireland's Inter-Provincial Championship gaining first-class status. For Irish cricketers who made their debut in first-class cricket after March 2017, see: List of Leinster Lightning first-class players, List of Northern Knights first-class players, List of North West Warriors first-class players.

== Key ==
**General**

- † – Wicket-keeper
- **Team(s)** – First-class teams played for
- **First** – Year of debut in first-class cricket
- **Last** – Year of last/latest match played in first-class cricket
- **Mat** – Number of matches played in first-class cricket
- – Player still active in first-class cricket
- **Bold** – Player has played Test cricket

**Batting**

- **Inn** – Number of innings batted
- **Runs** – Runs scored in career
- **HS** – Highest score
- **Avg** – Runs scored per dismissal
- * – Batsman remained not out

**Bowling**

- **Balls** – Balls bowled in career
- **Wkt** – Wickets taken in career
- **BBI** – Best bowling in an innings
- **Ave** – Average runs per wicket

**Fielding**

- **Ca** – Catches taken
- **St** – Stumpings effected

== List of first-class cricketers ==
No.	Name	Team(s)	First	Last	Mat	Runs	HS	Avg	Balls	Wkt	BBI	Ave	Ca	St
No.	Name	Team(s)	First	Last	Mat	Batting			Bowling				Fielding	
1	Edward Bligh †	Marylebone Cricket Club, Kent, Hampshire, Middlesex, Surrey, England, Gentlemen	1790	1813	76	1,311	64	10.24	?	2	1/?	?	36	6
2	John Parnell	Cambridge University	1831	1831	1	25	22	25.00	0	0	–	–	0	0
3	Lord Clonbrock	England, Marylebone Cricket Club, Gentlemen	1832	1834	5	13	6	1.62	0	0	–	–	0	0
4	Edward Turnour	Sussex, Marylebone Cricket Club, Petworth	1834	1856	25	110	20	2.68	0	0	–	–	2	0
5	Thomas Bourke	Marylebone Cricket Club, Hampshire	1843	1845	4	25	8	5.00	0	0	–	–	2	0
6	Charles Cameron	Lancashire	1849	1849	1	0	0*	0.00	0	0	–	–	0	0
7	Audley Archdall	Gentlemen of Kent	1851	1851	1	0	0	0.00	0	0	–	–	0	0
8	Henry Maturin	Middlesex, Hampshire, Gentlemen of the South	1863	1882	12	178	28	9.88	436	8	4/68	33.50	7	0
9	Edward Bowen	Hampshire	1864	1864	1	0	0	0.00	0	0	–	–	0	0
10	William Hone	Marylebone Cricket Club, Southgate	1864	1877	9	266	76	20.46	108	3	3/41	21.33	6	0
11	Richard Young	Marylebone Cricket Club	1873	1873	1	11	11	5.50	0	0	–	–	0	0
12	Goodwin Young	Cambridge University	1873	1873	3	17	12*	5.66	649	16	5/24	15.87	2	0
13	Milo Talbot	Gentlemen of the South	1875	1875	1	1	1	0.50	0	0	–	–	2	0
14	Robert Fowler	Cambridge University	1876	1876	1	4	3	2.00	0	0	–	–	0	0
15	David Trotter	North	1877	1877	1	42	33	21.00	0	0	–	–	1	0
15	John Spring †	Otago	1877/78	1884/85	8	127	18	9.07	0	0	–	–	1	1
16	**Leland Hone** †	Marylebone Cricket Club, England, Lord Harris' XI	1878	1878/79	8	85	27	7.08	0	0	–	–	9	2
17	Nathaniel Hone †	Cambridge University	1881	1881	3	2	1	1.00	0	0	–	–	6	2
18	**Tim O'Brien**	England, Middlesex, MCC, Oxford University, Ireland, Gentlemen, South	1881	1914	266	11,397	202	27.00	484	4	1/10	85.00	173	2
19	William Hamilton †	Oxford University, Marylebone Cricket Club	1882	1882	9	310	54	20.66	0	0	–	–	5	0
20	Ronald McNeill	Marylebone Cricket Club	1885	1885	1	2	2	2.00	0	0	–	–	0	0
21	John Usher	Yorkshire	1888	1888	1	7	5	3.50	72	2	2/11	15.50	1	0
22	George Berkeley	Oxford University, Gentlemen, Gentlemen of England	1890	1906	32	324	38	10.12	6,288	131	8/70	20.75	17	0
23	Charles Johnson	Europeans	1893/94	1893/94	2	36	26	18.00	0	0	–	–	0	0
24	James McDonogh	North Island, Europeans, Gentlemen of Philadelphia	1893/94	1908/09	6	203	86	18.45	618	10	4/53	25.70	3	0
25	Edmund Saulez	Europeans	1894/95	1894/95	2	5	5	1.66	0	0	–	–	2	0
26	Dan Comyn	Dublin University, Ireland	1895	1902	8	290	54	18.12	140	0	–	–	1	0
27	Lucius Gwynn	Dublin University, Gentlemen, Ireland	1895	1902	8	577	153*	44.38	1,101	18	4/81	22.77	10	0
28	Arthur Gwynn †	Dublin University	1895	1895	4	267	130	33.37	0	0	–	–	5	1
29	John Brunskill	Dublin University	1895	1895	4	134	58	16.75	85	0	–	–	0	0
30	Marshall Porter	Dublin University	1895	1895	4	87	44	10.87	10	0	–	–	2	0
31	Ernest Ensor	Dublin University	1895	1895	4	65	18	9.28	1,016	23	5/74	20.34	1	0
32	Patrick Maxwell	Dublin University	1895	1895	4	105	39	13.12	0	0	–	–	1	0
33	George Meldon	Dublin University	1895	1895	4	93	33	15.50	0	0	–	–	2	0
34	Robert Gwynn	Dublin University	1895	1895	4	52	23*	10.40	435	8	3/21	34.25	2	0
35	William MacCarthy-Morrogh	Dublin University	1895	1895	1	3	2	1.50	95	0	–	–	1	0
36	George Harman	Dublin University	1895	1895	1	2	2*	2.00	0	0	–	–	0	0
37	Arthur Ross	Dublin University	1895	1895	2	22	11	5.50	0	0	–	–	0	0
38	Arthur Wallis	Dublin University	1895	1895	3	7	5*	2.33	465	6	3/110	53.16	1	0
39	William Crozier	Dublin University	1895	1895	1	7	4	3.50	75	0	–	–	0	0
40	Joseph Stephenson-Jellie	Gloucestershire	1896	1908	6	88	27	8.80	0	0	–	–	1	0
41	Henry Bond	Europeans	1898/99	1900/01	5	107	41	15.28	30	0	–	–	3	0
42	John Crawfurd	Oxford University, Ireland, LG Robinson's XI, Harlequins	1900	1927	19	644	72	23.00	759	13	3/30	31.00	15	0
43	George Gaukrodger †	Worcestershire, Players	1900	1910	115	2,241	91	16.84	0	0	–	–	168	63
44	Gus Kelly	Oxford University, Ireland, Marylebone Cricket Club	1901	1914	26	614	52	16.59	2,567	55	5/32	22.85	10	0
45	Lionel Milman	Europeans	1901/02	1901/02	2	3	3	3.00	330	4	3/50	29.25	0	0
46	Jack Meldon	Ireland	1902	1910	5	55	14	6.11	0	0	–	–	1	0
47	Bob Lambert	Ireland, London County, Woodbrook Club and Ground	1902	1928	25	1,121	103*	28.47	3,896	70	7/11	24.08	19	0
48	Francis Browning †	Ireland, Gentlemen of Ireland	1902	1909	11	363	56	18.15	0	0	–	–	9	4
49	Tom Ross	Ireland, Gentlemen	1902	1910	10	320	89	20.00	1,868	46	7/82	19.58	8	0
50	Sep Lambert	Ireland	1902	1921	7	184	60*	23.00	0	0	–	–	3	0
51	Robert Adair	Ireland	1902	1902	4	86	32	14.33	54	1	1/29	37.00	3	0
52	Oscar Andrews	Ireland, Gentlemen of Ireland	1902	1909	6	94	29*	10.44	168	4	2/8	23.50	6	0
53	William Harrington	Ireland, Gentlemen of Ireland	1902	1921	15	153	28	7.65	2,770	53	7/76	19.22	3	0
54	Arnold Harvey	Ireland	1902	1902	2	113	62	28.25	72	2	2/67	39.00	1	0
55	Donough O'Brien	Ireland, Marylebone Cricket Club	1902	1907	3	77	57	15.40	0	0	–	–	1	0
56	John Monteath	Ireland	1903/04	1903/04	1	1	1	0.50	0	0	–	–	0	0
57	Hubert de Burgh	Ireland	1905/06	1926	2	39	28	13.00	0	0	–	–	0	0
58	James Magee	Ireland, Gentlemen of Ireland	1907	1909	3	64	16	9.00	0	0	–	–	1	0
59	George Meldon	Ireland, Woodbrook Club and Ground	1907	1912	10	263	41	14.61	11	1	1/4	4.00	4	0
60	William Harman	Ireland	1907	1907	1	2	2	1.00	0	0	–	–	1	0
61	Edward Donavon	Ireland	1907	1907	1	5	3*	5.00	60	1	1/36	36.00	0	0
62	George Morrow	Ireland, Gentlemen of Ireland, Woodbrook Club and Ground	1907	1912	8	271	50*	20.84	122	5	4/42	14.00	4	0
63	Stuart Smith	Ireland	1907	1909	3	19	11	3.16	0	0	–	–	0	0
64	Blayney Hamilton	Ireland	1907	1907	1	4	4	2.00	18	0	–	–	2	0
65	Harry Corley	Ireland	1907	1909	4	50	27	7.14	0	0	–	–	4	0
66	Jack Gannon †	Marylebone Cricket Club, Europeans, Gentlemen of England	1908	1917/18	8	158	48	13.16	0	0	–	–	10	3
66	Matthew Parry	Warwickshire, Ireland	1908	1925	4	211	124	30.41	114	2	2/31	35.50	2	0
67	Wilfred Bourchier	Ireland	1908	1909	3	47	19	7.83	0	0	–	–	0	0
68	William Napper	Ireland, Gentlemen of Ireland	1908	1909	5	18	10	2.00	306	7	4/72	31.85	2	0
69	Louis Meldon	Ireland	1909	1912	4	151	47	25.16	24	0	–	–	3	0
70	William Pollock	Ireland, Woodbrook Club and Ground	1909	1923	5	312	144	34.66	450	9	3/47	22.22	1	0
71	Patrick Murphy	Ireland	1909	1912	2	26	10	13.00	192	4	2/92	29.25	1	0
72	Pat Hone †	Gentlemen of Ireland, Ireland	1909	1928	6	162	92	13.50	0	0	–	–	7	0
73	William Mooney	Gentlemen of Ireland, Ireland	1909	1912	3	25	23*	5.00	0	0	–	–	3	0
74	John Aston	Gentlemen of Ireland, Ireland	1909	1925	4	73	53*	10.42	366	9	5/58	11.22	1	0
75	William Coffey	Gentlemen of Ireland	1909	1909	1	4	4	2.00	90	3	3/40	13.33	0	0
76	Harry Read	Gentlemen of Ireland, Ireland	1909	1912	3	48	19	8.00	0	0	–	–	1	0
77	Joseph Lynch	Gentlemen of Ireland	1909	1909	1	12	11	6.00	36	0	–	–	0	0
78	John O'Brien	Ireland	1910	1910	1	7	4	3.50	00	0	–	–	1	0
79	William Meldon	Warwickshire, Ireland	1909	1914	8	208	44	16.00	692	14	5/53	24.14	4	0
80	Leslie Kidd	Cambridge University, Middlesex, Marylebone Cricket Club, Ireland, Gentlemen, South, Free Foresters	1910	1930	147	5,113	167	24.94	6,830	186	8/49	24.62	131	0
81	Henry Mulholland	Cambridge University, Ireland	1911	1914	32	1,642	153	30.40	2,007	51	5/9	23.86	37	0
82	Dickie Lloyd	Ireland, Lancashire, Free Foresters	1911	1922	6	202	51	20.20	0	0	–	–	5	0
83	Percy Ross	Ireland	1912	1912	1	29	26	14.50	138	2	2/99	49.50	0	0
84	Stanley Cochrane	Woodbrook Club and Ground	1912	1912	1	5	5	5.00	0	0	–	–	1	0
85	Peter Clarke	Ireland, Woodbrook Club and Ground, Middlesex, The Rest, Marylebone Cricket Club	1912	1914	19	125	28	7.81	2,102	47	5/62	29.27	7	0
86	Robert Gregory	Ireland	1912	1912	1	0	0	0.00	162	9	8/80	10.22	0	0
87	David Milling †	Ireland	1912	1914	2	17	8	5.66	0	0	–	–	1	2
88	Basil Ward	Ireland	1912	1920	4	56	17	11.20	751	13	4/66	21.00	3	0
89	Robert St Leger Fowler	Marylebone Cricket Club, Hampshire, Army, Combined Services, Gentlemen	1913	1924	24	957	92*	28.14	3,083	59	7/22	24.77	21	0
90	Arthur Blair-White	Ireland	1913	1913	1	30	23	15.00	0	0	–	–	0	0
91	Arthur Bateman	Ireland	1913	1914	2	149	52	37.25	0	0	–	–	2	0
92	Edward Rooney	Ireland	1913	1914	2	34	12*	17.00	0	0	–	–	1	0
93	George Macnamara	Ireland	1913	1913	1	54	30	54.00	78	0	–	–	1	0
94	Frederick Shaw	Ireland, Europeans, Army	1913	1924	7	193	65	17.54	782	21	7/30	13.80	8	0
95	Arthur Walker	Ireland	1913	1913	1	3	3	3.00	0	0	–	–	0	0
96	Rowan Rait-Kerr	Europeans, Army	1913/14	1931	6	89	24	7.41	00	0	–	–	3	0
97	Joseph Donnelly	Ireland	1914	1914	1	65	59	32.50	0	0	–	–	1	0
98	Reginald Green	Europeans	1915/16	1920/21	5	246	78	24.60	378	6	2/21	31.33	4	0
99	George Tottenham	Europeans	1915/16	1915/16	1	21	21	21.00	126	3	2/42	20.00	1	0
100	Claude Rigby	Lord Willingdon's XI	1917/18	1918/19	2	2	2*	2.00	12	0	–	–	0	0
101	Tom Jameson	Marylebone Cricket Club, Hampshire, Ireland, South, Army, Combined Services, Gentlemen, Free Foresters	1919	1937/38	124	4,675	133	26.56	12,559	252	7/92	24.03	102	0
102	Jack Gwynn	Europeans (India)	1919/20	1920/21	2	26	14	6.50	90	0	–	–	2	0
103	Augustine Kelly †	Ireland, Dublin University	1920	1930	14	505	98	21.04	0	0	–	–	17	6
104	Herbert Rollins	Ireland	1920	1920	1	11	8	5.50	0	0	–	–	1	0
105	Louis Bookman	Ireland	1920	1929	9	342	53	20.11	348	3	3/32	63.00	5	0
106	Richard Power	Ireland	1920	1926	4	78	30	13.00	0	0	–	–	1	0
107	James Kempster	Ireland	1920	1922	2	55	33	13.75	18	0	–	–	0	0
108	Jacko Heaslip	Ireland, Dublin University	1920	1929	10	389	92*	21.61	1,677	25	5/67	24.40	4	0
109	Desmond Murphy	Ireland	1920	1920	1	0	0	0.00	78	0	–	–	4	0
110	Wentworth Allen	Ireland, Dublin University	1920	1926	7	23	10*	4.60	1,083	15	2/20	29.00	3	0
111	Adderley Wilkinson	Europeans (India)	1920/21	1920/21	1	5	5	2.50	0	0	–	–	2	0
112	Jim Ganly	Ireland, Dublin University	1921	1937	15	468	62*	17.35	330	7	2/22	25.28	5	0
113	Robert Donovan	Ireland	1921	1921	1	3	3	3.00	0	0	–	–	0	0
114	Mark Sugden	Dublin University, Ireland	1922	1930	8	263	51	17.53	446	6	3/98	42.50	3	0
115	Wilfred Hutton	Dublin University	1922	1922	1	2	2	1.00	0	0	–	–	0	0
116	David Pigot, Sr.	Dublin University, Ireland	1922	1939	11	338	51	15.36	42	0	–	–	4	0
117	Gustavus Kelly	Dublin University, Ireland	1922	1926	7	275	76*	30.55	940	17	6/62	23.35	5	0
118	Billy King	Dublin University	1922	1922	1	15	8	7.50	36	0	–	–	1	0
119	James Wills	Dublin University, Ireland	1922	1926	4	66	28	9.42	516	7	3/5	33.71	1	0
120	Cyril Parker	Dublin University	1922	1922	1	42	29	21.00	0	0	–	–	1	0
121	Charles McCausland	Dublin University, Ireland	1922	1925	5	139	26	13.90	396	3	2/38	58.33	4	0
122	Samuel Middleton	Dublin University	1922	1922	1	0	0*	0.00	24	0	–	–	0	0
123	John Dearden †	Ireland	1922	1926	2	84	84	28.00	0	0	–	–	1	1
124	Lawrence Walker	Ireland	1922	1926	3	27	13*	13.50	726	9	5/125	31.55	0	0
125	William Cullen	Europeans, Europeans and Parsees	1922/23	1928/29	8	376	120	31.33	0	0	–	–	6	0
126	Ogilvie Graham	Europeans, Free Foresters, Army	1923	1926/27	4	31	16	5.16	330	10	4/12	16.50	2	0
127	Harold Jackson	Ireland	1923	1923	1	65	62*	65.00	72	1	1/35	35.00	0	0
128	Wallace Sproule	Ireland	1923	1923	1	1	1	0.50	294	6	4/64	13.83	2	0
129	Cecil Pemberton	Dublin University, Ireland	1923	1928	4	55	31	13.75	666	5	3/40	52.60	1	0
130	Arthur Robinson	Dublin University, Ireland	1924	1929	7	155	32	12.91	0	0	–	–	3	0
131	Derrick Hall	Dublin University, Ireland	1924	1926	3	71	34	14.20	0	0	–	–	2	0
132	Thomas Carey	Dublin University	1924	1924	1	21	15	10.50	54	2	2/41	20.50	0	0
133	Achey Kelly	Dublin University, Ireland	1924	1926	4	92	35	11.50	102	3	3/29	19.66	1	0
134	Derrick Kennedy	Dublin University, Ireland	1924	1924	2	23	15*	11.50	132	1	1/65	89.00	1	0
135	Finlay Jackson	Ireland	1924	1925	3	154	74	38.50	0	0	–	–	0	0
136	Joseph Coskery	Ireland	1924	1924	1	7	4*	7.00	0	0	–	–	0	0
137	Arthur Douglas	Ireland	1925	1933	7	262	63	18.71	862	12	4/35	28.41	4	0
138	James Pigot	Dublin University, Europeans	1925	1933	5	67	50	8.37	222	4	3/71	46.00	3	0
139	George McVeagh	Dublin University, Ireland	1925	1934	12	814	109	38.76	0	0	–	–	11	0
140	Joseph Peacocke	Dublin University, Ireland	1925	1926	2	86	48	21.50	0	0	–	–	0	0
141	Samuel Beckett	Dublin University	1925	1926	2	35	18	8.75	138	0	–	–	2	0
142	Burry McMahon	Dublin University	1925	1926	3	23	18	4.60	318	2	2/92	89.00	4	0
143	Stephen Radcliffe	Dublin University	1925	1926	2	28	14	7.00	42	1	1/11	11.00	1	0
144	Myer Hoffman	Dublin University	1925	1925	1	6	6*	6.00	18	0	–	–	0	0
145	Jack Lawrence	Dublin University	1926	1926	1	7	6	3.50	0	0	–	–	0	0
146	Thomas Dixon	Dublin University, Ireland, Delhi, Viceroy's XI	1926	1936/37	14	312	45*	14.18	2,484	50	7/51	20.86	4	0
147	Patrick Dixon	Dublin University, Ireland	1926	1932	3	69	47	11.50	18	0	–	–	1	0
148	James Ennis	Dublin University	1926	1926	1	0	0	0.00	0	0	–	–	0	0
149	Charles Anderson	Ireland	1926	1926	1	0	0	0.00	78	0	–	–	0	0
150	Robert Moore	Ireland	1926	1926	2	51	22	17.00	24	0	–	–	0	0
151	Edward Barry	Ireland	1926	1926	2	20	15	10.00	144	1	1/44	70.00	1	0
152	Albert Anderson	Ireland	1926	1926	1	18	18	9.00	0	0	–	–	1	0
153	James MacDonald	Ireland	1926	1939	14	662	108*	23.92	2,759	35	5/33	25.45	5	0
154	James Foley	Ireland	1926	1926	1	26	16	13.00	108	0	–	–	0	0
155	Robert Bowers	Ireland	1926	1926	1	10	5	5.00	150	0	–	–	2	0
156	Colville Deverell	Dublin University	1926	1926	1	3	2	1.50	0	0	–	–	0	0
157	Harry Forsyth †	Dublin University	1926	1926	1	49	43	24.50	0	0	–	–	2	1
158	Shaun Jeffares	Dublin University	1926	1926	1	15	13	7.50	162	2	2/72	36.00	0	0
159	Hugh Baker	Dublin University	1926	1926	1	2	2	2.00	0	0	–	–	0	0
160	David Gwynn	Dublin University	1926	1926	1	11	11*	11.00	0	0	–	–	0	0
161	David Pickeman	Ireland	1926	1926	1	1	1	1.00	0	0	–	–	1	0
162	Douglas Cordner †	Ireland	1926	1926	1	3	3*	3.00	0	0	–	–	0	0
163	Charles Hill	Ireland	1927	1927	1	5	5	5.00	0	0	–	–	0	0
164	Richard Blakeney	Europeans, Sind	1926/27	1934/35	2	22	16	7.33	42	1	1/19	19.00	0	0
165	Herbert Aston	Rangoon Gymkhana, Burma	1926/27	1926/27	2	32	22	10.66	204	2	2/106	78.00	1	0
166	Edward Seymour	Ireland	1927	1928	3	9	3	1.80	270	4	2/26	36.75	1	0
167	Thomas MacDonald	Ireland, Cambridge University	1928	1936	7	291	132	20.78	72	0	–	–	4	0
168	Eddie Ingram	Ireland, Middlesex	1928	1953	31	766	64	15.01	6,105	79	5/48	24.00	11	0
169	Bill Loughery	Ireland	1929	1933	2	34	18*	11.33	0	0	–	–	1	0
170	Wilfred McDonough	Ireland	1930	1930	1	61	48	30.05	0	0	–	–	0	0
171	James Boucher	Ireland	1930	1954	28	625	85	13.58	5,544	168	7/13	14.04	23	0
172	Robert Barnes	Ireland	1930	1947	8	199	48	14.21	300	9	4/18	11.00	7	0
173	Desmond Surfleet	Cambridge University, Middlesex	1931	1933	14	337	86	16.85	30	0	–	–	7	0
174	Frank Reddy	Ireland	1931	1939	7	202	50*	16.83	0	0	–	–	11	0
175	George Crothers †	Ireland	1931	1947	10	174	41	9.66	0	0	–	–	6	3
176	Henry Morgan	Ireland	1931	1947	4	54	21	10.80	642	18	7/41	10.38	2	0
177	Ham Lambert	Ireland	1932	1947	9	213	69*	14.20	0	0	–	–	5	0
178	Robert Alexander	Ireland	1932	1932	1	29	22	14.50	132	0	–	–	0	0
179	Donald Shearer	Ireland, Marylebone Cricket Club	1932	1952	14	628	72	24.15	0	0	–	–	12	0
180	Thomas McMurray	Surrey	1933	1939	33	892	62	18.58	18	1	1/3	23.00	14	0
181	Samuel Edgar	Ireland	1934	1934	1	32	32	16.00	0	0	–	–	0	0
182	Francis Connell	Ireland	1934	1938	5	262	87	26.20	0	0	–	–	2	0
183	Basil Goulding †	Ireland	1934	1934	1	0	0*	0.00	0	0	–	–	0	0
184	Thomas Martin	Ireland	1934	1934	1	7	7	7.00	108	0	–	–	0	0
185	Roland Shortt	Ireland	1934	1934	1	0	0	0.00	156	3	3/22	22.00	0	0
186	Frank Quinn	Ireland	1936	1948	7	227	140	16.21	84	0	–	–	6	0
187	James Graham	Ireland	1936	1939	6	50	12*	4.54	972	13	3/76	29.92	3	0
188	Charles Billingsley	Ireland	1936	1938	5	19	6*	3.80	663	18	4/19	14.72	1	0
189	Paget O'Brien-Butler	Ireland	1936	1936	1	33	18	16.50	0	0	–	–	0	0
190	Charles Cuffe †	Ireland	1936	1939	3	61	18	15.25	0	0	–	–	2	4
191	Thomas Ward	Ireland	1936	1939	2	7	3*	7.00	312	5	2/31	27.80	1	0
192	Gerry Quinn	Ireland	1937	1937	1	14	12	7.00	0	0	–	–	1	0
193	Marcus Ruddle	Ireland	1937	1937	1	0	0*	0.00	48	0	–	–	0	0
194	David McKibbin	Ireland	1937	1937	1	46	31	23.00	0	0	–	–	0	0
195	Andy McFarlane	Ireland	1937	1937	1	23	23	11.50	0	0	–	–	1	0
196	Charles Mellon	Ireland	1937	1938	2	48	30	12.00	12	0	–	–	1	0
197	Bernard Bergin	Ireland	1937	1937	1	16	12	8.00	0	0	–	–	1	0
198	John Barnes	Ireland	1937	1937	1	0	0	0.00	36	0	–	–	0	0
199	Noel Larmour	Ireland	1938	1938	1	45	34	22.50	0	0	–	–	0	0
200	James Brophy †	Ireland	1938	1938	1	13	9	6.50	0	0	–	–	0	0
201	Frederick Blaney †	Ireland	1939	1939	1	14	13	7.00	0	0	–	–	0	0
202	Thomas Williams	Ireland	1939	1939	1	25	23	12.50	89	1	1/36	50.00	1	0
203	Alfred McMurray	Ireland	1939	1939	1	9	5	4.50	0	0	–	–	1	0
204	Stuart Pollock	Ireland	1939	1958	23	1,036	129	25.26	6	0	–	–	17	0
205	Maurice Robinson	Europeans, Hyderabad, Madras, Glamorgan, Combined Services, Warwickshire	1942/43	1952	83	2,719	190	22.10	1,526	34	7/51	25.58	22	0
206	Paddy Waldron	Ireland	1946	1947	4	99	32	12.37	0	0	–	–	0	0
207	John Hill	Ireland	1946	1951	7	82	18*	16.40	1,027	17	3/16	21.58	1	0
208	Jack Bowden	Ireland	1946	1955	6	52	34	5.77	1,006	19	6/23	19.42	6	0
209	William McKee	Ireland	1946	1946	1	16	16	16.00	114	0	–	–	2	0
210	Roderick Gill	Ireland	1947	1950	3	72	37	14.40	348	3	2/19	42.66	2	0
211	Sonny Hool	Ireland	1947	1961	9	132	27	16.50	1,261	18	5/73	33.38	4	0
212	Reginald Lyons †	Ireland	1947	1947	1	0	0*	0.00	0	0	–	–	0	4
213	George Morrison	Ireland	1947	1947	2	48	16	12.00	84	0	–	–	0	0
214	Charles Posnett	Ireland	1947	1947	1	46	26	23.00	0	0	–	–	1	0
215	Noel Mahony	Ireland	1948	1953	5	116	29	11.60	0	0	–	–	3	0
216	Louis Jacobson	Ireland	1948	1952	4	153	101*	30.60	0	0	–	–	1	0
217	Simon Curley	Ireland	1948	1951	5	175	43	19.44	0	0	–	–	6	0
218	George Wilson	Ireland	1948	1951	3	116	39	19.33	30	2	2/12	6.00	0	0
219	Frank Filgas †	Ireland	1948	1948	1	3	3	1.50	0	0	–	–	1	0
220	David Graham	Ireland	1948	1948	1	13	7	6.50	96	1	1/13	20.00	0	0
221	James Gill	Ireland	1948	1948	1	106	106	53.00	0	0	–	–	0	0
222	Lloyd Armstrong	Ireland	1948	1953	5	121	29*	13.44	342	6	4/16	21.50	1	0
223	Joseph Caprani	Ireland	1948	1960	5	95	44	9.50	0	0	–	–	5	0
224	John Wallace Allen	Ireland	1948	1948	1	0	0	0.00	0	0	–	–	0	0
225	Victor Craig †	Ireland	1948	1948	1	12	12	12.00	0	0	–	–	2	0
226	Edward Jeffares	Madras	1948/49	1948/49	1	6	6	6.00	30	0	–	–	0	0
227	Stanley Bergin	Ireland	1949	1965	27	1,610	137	34.25	0	0	–	–	6	0
228	Herbie Martin	Ireland	1949	1968	19	671	88	19.17	0	0	–	–	17	0
229	Frank Miller †	Ireland	1949	1954	7	44	18*	8.80	0	0	–	–	8	7
230	Thomas Newburn	Ireland	1949	1949	1	12	8	6.00	168	3	3/23	10.33	1	0
231	Larry Warke	Ireland	1950	1961	17	405	120	13.96	594	7	1/0	46.57	20	0
232	Noel Ferguson	Ireland	1951	1964	5	122	37	15.25	869	19	6/37	19.73	3	0
233	Scott Huey	Ireland	1951	1966	20	134	23*	5.15	3,534	66	8/48	18.22	14	0
215	Thomas McCloy	Ireland	1952	1965	12	374	53	15.58	6	0	–	–	6	0
216	Bill Haughton	Ireland	1953	1953	1	0	0	0.00	0	0	–	–	0	0
217	Eddie Marks †	Ireland	1953	1955	3	35	17	5.83	0	0	–	–	5	2
218	Peter Webb	Ireland	1953	1953	2	3	3*	3.00	167	4	2/11	14.75	3	0
219	Ciaran Ó Máille	Ireland	1953	1960	2	10	5	5.00	0	0	–	–	2	0
220	Mervyn Jaffey †	Ireland	1953	1953	1	0	0	0.00	0	0	–	–	1	1
221	Joseph Burke	Ireland	1953	1958	3	36	19	12.00	156	3	2/32	35.00	2	0
222	Gerry Duffy	Ireland	1953	1973	16	317	55*	15.09	1,217	15	3/8	28.40	12	0
223	James McKelvey	Ireland	1954	1958	2	25	9	6.25	0	0	–	–	1	0
224	Robin O'Brien	Cambridge University, Ireland, Marylebone Cricket Club	1954	1958	40	1,609	146	22.66	6	0	–	–	10	0
225	Jack Simpson	Ireland	1954	1954	1	26	26	26.00	90	0	–	–	0	0
226	Godfrey Graham	Ireland	1954	1954	1	1	1*	–	138	2	2/100	50.00	1	0
227	Michael Dargan	Ireland	1954	1954	1	10	7	5.00	0	0	–	–	3	0
228	Alf Cooper	Ireland	1954	1954	1	50	31	25.00	66	2	2/35	19.00	0	0
229	Ernest Bodell	Ireland	1954	1959	2	25	11*	6.25	1,026	11	4/27	42.18	1	0
230	Noel Cantwell	Ireland	1956	1956	1	48	31	48.00	12	0	–	–	0	0
231	Ian Lewis	Ireland	1956	1972	5	67	20	6.70	0	0	–	–	2	0
232	Walter Fawcett †	Ireland	1956	1959	6	56	21	8.00	0	0	–	–	8	4
233	Wesley Ferris	Ireland	1956	1956	2	10	4*	10.00	294	4	4/106	36.00	0	0
234	Paddy Neville	Ireland	1956	1960	4	134	38	17.87	0	0	–	–	4	0
235	Ian Wilson	Ireland	1956	1961	3	49	18	9.80	353	7	3/7	16.71	1	
236	Francis Fee	Ireland	1956	1959	5	57	15*	8.14	1,082	37	9/26	9.62	4	0
237	Kevin Quinn	Ireland	1957	1959	3	49	25	9.80	12	0	–	–	0	0
238	Aubrey Finlay	Ireland	1957	1965	9	170	30	11.33	0	0	–	–	12	0
239	Philip Hollick	Ireland	1957	1957	1	0	0	0.00	0	0	–	–	1	0
240	Raymond Hunter	Ireland	1958	1965	11	202	39	11.22	996	19	5/22	23.42	11	0
241	Ken Hope	Ireland	1958	1966	9	75	21	6.81	958	12	6/59	28.25	5	0
242	Wilson Scott	Ireland	1958	1958	1	0	0	0.00	30	0	–	–	0	0
243	Alec O'Riordan	Ireland	1958	1977	25	614	117	15.74	4,498	75	6/35	21.38	19	0
244	Charles Corry	Ireland	1959	1966	4	40	17	6.66	0	0	–	–	2	0
245	Ossie Colhoun †	Ireland	1959	1979	28	74	9*	4.62	0	0	–	–	44	2
246	Rodney Bernstein	Ireland	1960	1962	6	89	18	8.90	816	16	4/23	25.37	1	0
247	Robin Waters †	LC Stevens XI, Oxford University, Sussex, Bengal, Ireland	1960	1969	38	929	70	18.21	0	0	–	–	52	3
248	Given Lyness	Ireland	1961	1961	1	12	9	6.00	229	8	6/39	11.25	2	0
249	Archie McQuilken	Ireland	1962	1962	2	140	42	35.00	115	5	5/37	12.00	0	0
250	Patrick Dineen	Ireland	1962	1971	7	179	84	17.90	0	0	–	–	3	0
251	Ken Kirkpatrick	Ireland	1962	1962	1	31	30	31.00	72	0	–	–	1	0
252	Donald Pratt	Ireland	1963	1966	6	171	58	14.25	0	0	–	–	0	0
253	Joey O'Meara	Ireland	1963	1963	1	0	0	0.00	39	1	1/14	14.00	3	0
254	Conn McCall	Ireland	1964	1968	7	308	81	23.69	1	0	–	–	3	0
255	Dermott Monteith	Ireland, Middlesex	1965	1984	28	530	95	15.58	5,603	94	7/38	20.64	22	0
256	Douglas Goodwin	Ireland	1965	1973	11	188	39	13.42	1,703	20	5/46	29.15	2	0
257	Patrick Hughes	Ireland	1965	1972	5	55	35	11.00	873	9	3/77	48.77	6	0
258	David Pigot, Jr.	Ireland	1965	1975	11	406	88	19.33	0	0	–	–	8	0
259	Brendan O'Brien	Ireland	1966	1981	11	319	45*	19.93	0	0	–	–	6	0
260	Ivan Anderson	Ireland	1966	1982	19	947	147	37.88	873	17	5/21	14.64	9	0
261	Stanley Hewitt	Ireland	1966	1966	1	53	36	26.50	48	0	–	–	1	0
262	Denis Leng	Ireland	1966	1966	1	1	1	1.00	102	1	1/36	36.00	1	0
263	Roy Torrens	Ireland	1966	1982	6	42	17	6.00	969	26	7/40	15.46	1	0
264	Roy Harrison	Ireland	1968	1968	1	16	12	8.00	0	0	–	–	2	0
265	Jim Harrison	Ireland	1969	1977	8	309	100*	22.07	0	0	–	–	3	0
266	Simon Corlett	Oxford University, Ireland	1970	1987	33	697	60	18.83	5,253	79	7/82	29.50	26	0
267	Michael Reith	Ireland	1970	1980	9	346	82	21.62	162	1	1/24	56.00	5	0
268	Raymond Moan	Ireland	1970	1970	1	0	0*	–	96	1	1/58	58.00	0	0
269	Michael Halliday	Ireland	1970	1989	14	250	47	25.00	2,565	36	5/39	26.80	5	0
270	Graham Crothers	Ireland	1972	1972	1	10	10	5.00	0	0	–	–	1	0
271	Alfie Linehan	Ireland	1972	1974	2	29	16	7.25	0	0	–	–	2	0
272	Andy Murtagh	Hampshire, Eastern Province	1973	1977	27	640	65	15.23	714	6	2/46	81.50	9	0
273	Christopher Harte	Ireland	1973	1981	2	82	40	27.33	0	0	–	–	0	0
274	John Elder	Ireland	1973	1985	9	36	11*	6.00	938	14	3/56	24.07	7	0
275	Jack Short	Ireland	1974	1984	11	533	114	33.31	0	0	–	–	10	0
276	Stanley Mitchell	Ireland	1974	1974	1	29	27	14.50	0	0	–	–	1	0
277	Gerard O'Brien	Ireland	1976	1977	2	22	11	5.50	0	0	–	–	3	0
278	Deryck Harrison	Ireland	1978	1979	2	0	0	0.00	0	0	–	–	2	0
279	Sandy Smith	Ireland	1978	1979	2	11	11*	–	0	0	–	–	1	0
280	Ian Johnston	Ireland	1979	1983	3	86	34	28.66	6	0	–	–	3	0
281	Eddie Bushe †	Ireland	1979	1980	2	14	14	14.00	0	0	–	–	7	1
282	Thomas Harpur	Ireland	1980	1981	2	10	6	5.00	18	0	–	–	2	0
283	Mark Cohen	Ireland	1980	1993	10	320	60	18.82	6	0	–	–	4	0
284	Stephen Warke	Ireland	1981	1986	13	966	144*	43.90	30	0	–	–	8	0
285	John Prior	Ireland	1981	1986	6	232	87	25.77	311	3	2/7	39.66	3	0
286	Robert Wills	Ireland	1981	1985	5	121	48	17.28	0	0	–	–	0	0
287	Paul Jackson †	Ireland	1981	1993	11	244	59	20.33	0	0	–	–	19	5
288	Enda McDermott	Ireland	1982	1982	1	18	18	9.00	0	0	–	–	2	0
289	Peter O'Reilly	Ireland	1982	1984	2	1	1*	1.00	156	5	3/43	16.20	0	0
290	David Dennison	Ireland	1983	1987	2	32	16	8.00	0	0	–	–	1	0
291	Garfield Harrison	Ireland	1983	1996	12	670	105*	41.87	1,562	23	9/113	30.56	3	0
292	Jim Patterson	Ireland	1984	1992	4	211	84	42.20	216	3	2/54	32.00	3	0
293	Naseer Shaukat	Faisalabad, Water and Power Development Authority, Ireland	1984/85	2004	50	1,564	89	23.69	5,794	135	7/42	23.03	27	0
294	Michael Rea	Ireland	1985	1994	8	500	115	33.33	0	0	–	–	2	0
295	Junior McBrine	Ireland	1985	1992	4	155	102	25.83	594	6	3/64	36.83	1	0
296	Jonathan Garth	Ireland	1986	1989	3	34	11	5.66	192	0	–	–	2	0
297	James McBrine	Ireland	1986	1986	1	29	27*	–	162	0	–	–	1	0
298	Hugh Milling	Ireland	1987	1987	1	6	4*	6.00	174	6	4/81	16.33	1	0
299	Justin Benson	Leicestershire, Ireland	1988	1997	57	2,158	153	28.39	824	11	2/24	48.36	66	0
300	Deryck Vincent	Ireland	1988	1988	1	24	16	12.00	0	0	–	–	0	0
301	Alan Lewis	Ireland	1988	1996	8	640	122*	53.33	354	5	2/39	55.20	5	0
302	Nigel Thompson	Ireland	1988	1991	3	79	38	15.80	381	3	2/67	64.33	1	0
303	Paul Wallace	Ireland	1988	1988	1	0	0	0.00	150	2	2/91	45.50	0	0
304	Alan Nelson	Ireland	1988	1991	4	56	23*	18.66	750	14	5/27	22.57	2	0
305	Mark Nulty	Ireland	1989	1989	1	60	43	30.00	0	0	–	–	0	0
306	Alan Jeffrey	Ireland	1989	1989	1	12	12*	–	116	4	3/22	15.25	0	0
307	Angus Dunlop	Ireland	1990	2000	8	603	150	43.07	240	2	1/8	71.50	3	0
308	Paul McCrum	Ireland	1990	1997	4	49	44*	16.33	588	5	3/56	68.60	0	0
309	**Martin McCague**	Western Australia, Kent, England	1990/91	2001	135	2,324	72	16.48	22,973	456	9/86	27.17	75	0
310	Stephen Smyth	Ireland	1991	1999	5	188	70	23.50	12	0	–	–	1	0
311	Conor Hoey	Ireland	1991	1994	4	21	8	7.00	687	9	3/38	37.11	1	0
312	Keith Bailey †	Ireland	1991	1991	1	0	–	–	0	0	–	–	1	1
313	Uel Graham	Ireland	1992	1994	2	64	35	32.00	114	1	1/8	43.00	0	0
314	Charles McCrum	Ireland	1992	1992	1	109	70	54.54	168	3	3/57	32.33	0	0
315	Paul Moore †	Ireland	1992	1992	1	0	0*	–	0	0	–	–	2	0
316	Dekker Curry	Ireland	1993	1997	2	54	41	13.50	60	1	1/12	16.00	0	0
317	Neil Doak	Ireland	1993	1994	2	58	27*	19.33	6	0	–	–	3	0
318	Edward Moore	Ireland	1993	1994	2	0	–	–	379	1	1/34	168.00	0	0
319	Gordon Cooke	Ireland	1994	1999	5	39	17	9.75	588	8	2/49	42.00	2	0
320	Brian Millar	Ireland †	1994	1994	1	0	–	–	0	0	–	–	2	0
321	Kyle McCallan	Ireland	1996	2009	25	552	65	22.08	3,679	55	5/34	29.41	17	0
322	Declan Moore	Ireland	1996	1996	1	68	51	34.00	36	0	–	–	1	0
323	Andrew Patterson †	Ireland, Sussex	1996	2000	10	155	31	11.07	0	0	–	–	18	0
324	Peter Gillespie	Ireland	1996	2007	13	322	53	21.46	198	5	3/93	30.60	7	0
325	Ryan Eagleson	Ireland, Derbyshire	1996	1999	2	91	50*	91.00	252	4	2/50	45.75	3	0
326	Alan Rutherford †	Ireland	1996	1999	4	66	26	16.50	0	0	–	–	6	1
327	Greg Molins	Ireland	1996	1999	4	3	2*	1.50	551	8	3/62	37.50	1	0
328	Owen Butler	Ireland	1996	1996	1	0	–	–	54	0	–	–	0	0
329	Regan West	Ireland	1996/97	2009	20	352	44*	18.52	3,432	45	7/88	37.75	11	0
330	**Ed Joyce**	Ireland, Middlesex, Sussex, Leinster Lightning	1997	2018	255	18,461	250	47.95	1,311	11	2/34	93.90	228	0
331	John Byrne	Ireland	1997	1997	1	19	12*	19.00	0	0	–	–	0	0
332	John Davy	Ireland	1997	1999	2	55	51*	27.50	261	5	3/33	32.08	0	0
333	Jason Molins	Oxford University, Ireland	1998	2005	11	435	73	25.58	6	1	1/12	12.00	3	0
334	Paul Mooney	Ireland	1998	2006	11	174	32	14.50	853	20	4/12	24.45	6	0
335	David Olphert	Ireland	1998	1998	1	1	1	0.50	24	0	–	–	1	0
336	Jonathan Bushe †	Ireland	1998	1998	1	6	4*	6.00	0	0	–	–	3	1
337	Matthew Dwyer	Ireland	1998	2000	2	7	4*	3.50	294	10	4/57	14.80	0	0
338	Trent Johnston	Ireland	1998/99	2013/14	33	703	71	21.30	4,475	103	6/23	20.18	19	0
339	Andre Botha	Griqualand West B, Griqualand West, Ireland	1998/99	2010/11	30	1,762	186	40.04	2,649	45	4/52	25.51	13	0
340	Peter Davy	Ireland	1999	1999	2	29	21	7.25	0	0	–	–	2	0
341	Neil Carson	Ireland	1999	1999	2	30	24	7.50	126	4	3/39	18.50	0	0
342	Barry Archer	Ireland	1999	1999	3	52	27	8.66	84	2	1/5	14.00	3	0
343	Richard McDaid	Ireland	1999	1999	2	6	6*	–	252	2	1/34	76.50	2	0
344	Peter Shields †	Ireland	1999	2000	2	54	31	13.50	0	0	–	–	2	0
345	Dwayne McGerrigle	Ireland	1999	1999	1	0	0	0.00	150	5	4/24	14.00	0	0
346	Adrian McCoubrey	Ireland, Essex	1999	2005/06	14	15	8*	2.50	1,704	34	4/16	34.32	8	0
347	**Tim Murtagh**	British Universities, Surrey, Middlesex, Marylebone Cricket Club, Ireland	2000	2023	264	4,360	74*	17.16	46,949	959	7/82	24.45	69	0
348	Gus Joyce	Ireland	2000	2000	1	31	29	15.50	0	0	–	–	2	0
349	Ryan Haire	Ireland	2000	2000	1	0	0	0.00	0	0	–	–	0	0
350	Mark Gillespie	Ireland	2000	2000	1	56	34	28.00	146	4	2/34	18.75	0	0
351	Gary Neely	Ireland	2000	2000	1	0	0	0.00	50	2	2/29	14.50	0	0
352	John Anderson	KwaZulu-Natal, Ireland	2001/02	2018	19	933	127	35.88	565	7	2/92	48.14	7	0
353	**Niall O'Brien** †	Kent, Ireland, Northamptonshire, Leicestershire, Marylebone Cricket Club	2004	2018	176	9,057	182	35.10	18	2	1/4	9.50	492	48
354	Dominick Joyce	Ireland	2004	2006	6	303	61	30.30	66	1	1/26	31.00	2	0
355	Jeremy Bray	Ireland	2004	2009	12	998	190	52.52	109	0	–	–	9	0
356	Andrew White	Ireland, Northamptonshire	2004	2013/14	34	1,965	152*	48.42	1,562	23	4/99	35.00	28	0
357	John Mooney	Ireland	2004	2015/16	17	723	107	40.16	1,453	35	5/36	22.68	15	0
358	Stephen Ogilby †	Ireland	2004	2004	2	0	0	0.00	0	0	–	–	8	0
359	Greg Thompson	Ireland, Lancashire, Durham UCCE, Northern Knights	2004	2017	14	207	38	20.70	1,107	17	3/76	35.58	8	0
360	**Eoin Morgan**	Ireland, Middlesex, England	2004	2019	102	5,042	209*	33.39	120	2	2/24	47.00	76	1
361	Andrew Poynter	Middlesex, Ireland	2005	2011	5	141	76*	28.20	6	0	–	–	5	0
362	Conor Armstrong	Ireland	2005	2005/06	4	17	12	5.66	132	0	–	–	2	0
363	**Gary Wilson** †	Ireland, Surrey, Derbyshire	2005	2019	107	4,834	160*	33.56	108	0	–	–	197	5
364	**William Porterfield**	Ireland, Marylebone Cricket Club, Gloucestershire, Warwickshire, North West Warriors	2006	2019	136	6,867	207	31.64	108	2	1/29	69.00	146	0
365	Dave Langford-Smith	Ireland	2006	2007/08	7	22	15	11.00	881	22	545	20.31	4	0
366	**Kevin O'Brien**	Ireland, Nottinghamshire, Surrey, Leinster Lightning	2006/07	2019	47	2,039	171*	37.07	2,745	47	5/39	27.74	36	0
367	**Boyd Rankin**	Ireland, Derbyshire, Warwickshire, England, North West Warriors	2006/07	2019	108	704	56*	9.14	15,592	352	6/55	26.46	29	0
368	Thinus Fourie	Ireland	2007	2008	3	6	6*	6.00	330	6	3/31	32.83	3	0
369	Alex Cusack	Ireland	2007	2013	19	852	130	35.50	833	12	4/31	32.16	12	0
370	**Paul Stirling**	Ireland, Middlesex	2007/08	2026	81	3,578	146	29.32	2,338	27	2/27	41.40	45	0
371	Reinhardt Strydom	Ireland	2007/08	2008	2	34	33	17.00	6	0	–	–	0	0
372	Gary Kidd	Ireland, Northern Knights	2008	2018	8	25	10	4.16	1,210	20	3/36	34.70	8	0
373	Peter Connell	Ireland	2008	2009/10	8	37	18	5.28	1,169	35	6/28	17.20	4	0
374	Fintan McAllister †	Ireland	2008	2008	1	0	–	–	0	0	–	–	1	0
375	Stuart Poynter †	Middlesex, Ireland, Warwickshire, Durham	2010	2021	47	1,522	170	22.05	0	0	–	–	139	4
376	Ben Ackland	Cambridge MCCU	2010	2012	7	365	74	33.18	6	0	–	–	2	0
376	James Hall	Ireland	2010	2010	1	7	7	7.00	0	0	–	–	1	0
377	Albert van der Merwe	Ireland	2010	2012	7	42	20	10.50	837	28	6/27	15.32	5	0
378	**George Dockrell**	Ireland, Somerset, Sussex, Leinster Lightning, Essex	2010	2024	63	1,128	92	19.44	11,836	187	6/27	30.51	28	0
379	Allan Eastwood	Ireland	2010	2010/11	3	17	9	8.50	486	9	4/62	32.44	0	0
380	Rory McCann †	Ireland	2010	2010	1	4	4	2.00	0	0	–	–	9	0
381	Phil Eaglestone	Ireland	2010	2011	5	11	10*	2.75	507	5	2/50	72.40	1	0
382	Graeme McCarter	Ireland, Gloucestershire, Northern Knights	2011	2019	14	232	62*	16.57	1,854	26	4/95	39.92	3	0
383	**Andrew Balbirnie**	Ireland, Cardiff MCCU, Middlesex, Leinster Lightning	2012	2026	47	1,928	205*	27.94	627	13	4/23	20.15	49	0
384	Max Sorensen	Ireland, Leinster Lightning	2012	2017	9	56	19*	9.33	1,262	32	5/37	20.53	5	0
385	James Shannon	Ireland, Northern Knights	2012	2019	13	833	140*	39.66	102	2	1/17	25.00	5	0
386	Andrew Britton	Ireland	2012	2012	1	0	0	0.00	81	0	–	–	2	0
387	**Andy McBrine**	Ireland, North West Warriors	2013	2026	32	1,446	90*	33.62	5,158	68	6/109	40.17	23	0
388	**Craig Young**	Ireland, North West Warriors	2013	2026	24	114	23	7.60	3,417	77	5/37	26.14	8	0
389	Peter Chase	Durham, Ireland, Leinster Lightning	2014	2020/21	19	117	24	13.00	2,306	49	5/24	30.30	6	0
390	**Mark Adair**	Ireland, Warwickshire, Northern Knights	2015	2026	21	844	91	32.14	2,727	52	5/39	29.23	15	0
391	**Barry McCarthy**	Ireland, Durham, Leinster Lightning	2015	2025/26	28	603	51*	18.84	4,191	86	6/63	28.56	11	0

== See also ==
- List of Ireland Test cricketers
- List of Ireland ODI cricketers
- List of Ireland Twenty20 International cricketers
- Category:Ireland cricketers - contains non-Irish cricketers who played as overseas players for Ireland
