= Wallace Sproule =

Irish cricketer

Personal information
- Full name: Wallace Sproule
- Born: 17 April 1891; Killyleagh, Ireland
- Died: 10 May 1957 (aged 66); Belfast, Northern Ireland
- Batting: Right-handed
- Bowling: Right-arm fast-medium

Domestic team information
- Years: Team
- 1923: Ireland

Career statistics
Competition	First-class
Matches	1
Runs scored	1
Batting average	0.50
100s/50s	–/–
Top score	1
Balls bowled	294
Wickets	6
Bowling average	13.83
5 wickets in innings	–
10 wickets in match	–
Best bowling	4/64
Catches/stumpings	2/–
- Source: Cricinfo, 3 November 2018

Wallace Sproule (17 April 1891 – 10 May 1957) was an Irish first-class cricketer.

== Early life ==
Sproule was born at Killyleagh in County Down, and was educated at The Royal School, Armagh. After completing his secondary education Sproule went up to Trinity College, Dublin in 1909. He played his club cricket for Dublin University, who regularly played host to English county opposition.

== Career ==
He served in the British Army with the infantry during World War I, where he held the rank of Second Lieutenant in August 1915. Emerging unscathed from the war, Sproule made a single appearance in first-class cricket for Ireland against Scotland at Dublin in 1923.

In Scotland's first-innings, he took 4 wickets with his fast-medium bowling, to finish with innings figures of 4/64; he followed this up with figures of 2/19 in Scotland's second-innings. Batting twice in the match, he was dismissed by John Christie in Ireland's first-innings for a single run, while in their second-innings he was dismissed without scoring by Gilbert Hole. He later played club cricket for Downpatrick, Dungannon, North of Ireland, and Bangor. He died at Belfast in May 1957, predeceasing his wife, Elizabeth, by twenty years.
