= International cricket in 1926 =

International cricket season

The 1926 International cricket season was from April 1926 to August 1926.

== Season overview ==
International tours
| Start date | Home team | Away team | Results [Matches] | | | |
| Start date | Home team | Away team | Test | ODI | FC | LA |
|---|---|---|---|---|---|---|
| 5 June 1926 | England | England Rest | — | — | 0–0 [1] | — |
| 12 June 1926 | England | Australia | 1–0 [5] | — | — | — |
| 26 June 1926 | Ireland | Wales | — | — | 0–0 [1] | — |
| 10 July 1926 | Scotland | Ireland | — | — | 1–0 [1] | — |
| 31 July 1926 | Netherlands | Foresters | — | — | 1–2 [4] | — |
| 28 August 1926 | Belgium | Netherlands | — | — | 0–1 [1] | — |

== June ==
=== Test trial in England ===
Three-day match
| No. | Date | Home captain | Away captain | Venue | Result |
|---|---|---|---|---|---|
| Match | 5–8 June | Not mentioned | Not mentioned | Lord's, London | Match drawn |

=== Australia in England ===
The Ashes Test series
| No. | Date | Home captain | Away captain | Venue | Result |
|---|---|---|---|---|---|
| Test 163 | 12–15 June | Arthur Carr | Herbie Collins | Trent Bridge, Nottingham | Match drawn |
| Test 164 | 26–29 June | Arthur Carr | Herbie Collins | Lord's, London | Match drawn |
| Test 165 | 10–13 July | Arthur Carr | Warren Bardsley | Headingley Cricket Ground, Leeds | Match drawn |
| Test 166 | 24–27 July | Arthur Carr | Warren Bardsley | Old Trafford Cricket Ground, Manchester | Match drawn |
| Test 167 | 14–18 August | Percy Chapman | Herbie Collins | Kennington Oval, London | England by 289 runs |

=== Wales in Ireland ===
Two-day Match
| No. | Date | Home captain | Away captain | Venue | Result |
|---|---|---|---|---|---|
| Match | 26–29 June | Jim Ganly | Norman Riches | Ormeau, Belfast | Match drawn |

== July ==
=== Ireland in Scotland ===
Three-day Match
| No. | Date | Home captain | Away captain | Venue | Result |
|---|---|---|---|---|---|
| Match | 10–13 July | Gilbert Hole | Jim Ganly | Glenpark Cricket Ground, Greenock | Scotland an innings and 147 runs |

=== Foresters in Netherlands ===
Two-day Match Series
| No. | Date | Home captain | Away captain | Venue | Result |
|---|---|---|---|---|---|
| Match 1 | 31 Jul–1 August | Not mentioned | Not mentioned | Antwerp | Match drawn |
| Match 2 | 2–3 August | Anthony de Beus | Not mentioned | De Diepput, The Hague | HCC by 7 wickets |
| Match 3 | 4–5 August | Dé Kessler | Not mentioned | Zomerland, Bilthoven | Free Foresters by 6 wickets |
| Match 4 | 6–7 August | Anthony de Beus | Not mentioned | Haarlem | Free Foresters by 113 runs |

== August ==
=== Netherlands in Belgium ===
Two-day Match
| No. | Date | Home captain | Away captain | Venue | Result |
|---|---|---|---|---|---|
| Match | 28–29 August | Not mentioned | Not mentioned | Brussels | Rood en Wit by an innings and 11 runs |
