= Edward Morant (cricketer, born 1868) =

English cricketer and diplomatic attaché

Personal information
- Full name: Edward John Harry Eden Morant
- Born: 29 January 1868; Westminster, London, England
- Died: 20 January 1910 (aged 41); Brockenhurst, Hampshire, England

Domestic team information
- Years: Team
- 1895: Marylebone Cricket Club

Career statistics
Competition	First-class
Matches	1
Runs scored	3
Batting average	–
100s/50s	0/0
Top score	3*
Balls bowled	70
Wickets	2
Bowling average	17.00
5 wickets in innings	0
10 wickets in match	0
Best bowling	2/34
Catches/stumpings	0/–
- Source: Cricinfo, 15 September 2021

Edward John Harry Eden Morant JP (29 January 1868 — 20 January 1910) was an English first-class cricketer and diplomatic attaché.

The son of John Morant, he was born at Westminster in January 1868. He was employed by the Foreign Office as a diplomatic attaché. Morant was appointed an honorary attaché at Athens in September 1890, prior to being transferred to Berlin in September 1891. In June 1892 he was transferred to Brussels, later serving for many years as attaché at Tangiers from November 1893. Morant was a great lover and liberal supporter of cricket, playing one first-class match for the Marylebone Cricket Club (MCC) against Dublin University at Dublin in 1895. He took two wickets in the match, dismissing Arthur Gwynn and Patrick Maxwell in the Dublin University second innings. He was appointed High Sheriff of Hampshire in 1907, having previously been unsuccessful in his 1904 nomination. He additionally served as a justice of the peace for Hampshire. Morant did much for the development of cricket in Hampshire, maintaining a personal cricket ground at his Brockenhurst Park estate, in addition to paying £25 per year to meet the expenses of the establishment in Southampton of a nursery for young cricketers. He died at his estate near Brockenhurst in January 1910, following an operation for appendicitis.
