= International cricket in 1928 =

International cricket season

The 1928 International cricket season was from April 1928 to August 1928.

== Season overview ==
International tours
Start date	Home team	Away team	Results [Matches]			
Start date	Home team	Away team	Test	ODI	FC	LA
30 May 1928	England	Wales	—	—	1–0 [1]	—
16 June 1928	England	England Rest	—	—	0–0 [1]	—
23 June 1928	England	West Indies	3–0 [3]	—	—	—
7 July 1928	Scotland	Ireland	—	—	0–0 [1]	—
26 July 1928	Netherlands	Marylebone	—	—	0–3 [3]	—
4 August 1928	Ireland	Marylebone	—	—	0–1 [1]	—
6 August 1928	Netherlands	Foresters	—	—	0–2 [3]	—

== May ==
=== Wales in England ===
Two-day Match
No.	Date	Home captain	Away captain	Venue	Result
Match	30 May–1 June	Not mentioned	Not mentioned	Lord's, London	Marylebone by 5 wickets

== June ==
=== Test Trial in England ===
Three-day match
No.	Date	Home captain	Away captain	Venue	Result
Match	16–19 June	Not mentioned	Not mentioned	Lord's, London	Match drawn

=== West Indies in England ===
Test series
No.	Date	Home captain	Away captain	Venue	Result
Test 173	23–26 June	Percy Chapman	Karl Nunes	Lord's, London	England by an innings and 58 runs
Test 174	21–24 July	Percy Chapman	Karl Nunes	Old Trafford Cricket Ground, Manchester	England by an innings and 30 runs
Test 175	11–14 August	Percy Chapman	Karl Nunes	Kennington Oval, London	England by an innings and 71 runs

== July ==
=== Ireland in Scotland ===
Three-day Match
No.	Date	Home captain	Away captain	Venue	Result
Match	6–9 July	John Kerr	Jim Ganly	Raeburn Place, Edinburgh	Match drawn

=== MCC in Netherlands ===
Two-day Match Series
No.	Date	Home captain	Away captain	Venue	Result
Match 1	26–27 July	W Eigeman	Pelham Warner	The Hague	Marylebone by an innings and 61 runs
Match 2	28–29 July	Anthony de Beus	Pelham Warner	The Hague	Marylebone by 10 wickets
Match 3	30–31 July	Not mentioned	Pelham Warner	Haarlem	Marylebone by 5 wickets

== August ==
=== MCC in Ireland ===
Two-day Match
No.	Date	Home captain	Away captain	Venue	Result
Match	26–27 July	Jim Ganly	Colin McIver	College Park, Dublin	Marylebone by 7 wickets

=== Foresters in Netherlands ===
Two-day Match Series
No.	Date	Home captain	Away captain	Venue	Result
Match 1	6–7 August	Anthony de Beus	Alexander Johnston	The Hague	Free Foresters by 37 runs
Match 2	8–9 August	Not mentioned	Alexander Johnston	Enschede	Free Foresters by an innings and 19 runs
Match 3	11–12 August	Anthony de Beus	Alexander Johnston	Haarlem	Match drawn
