= William Whitelaw (sportsman) =

Scottish cricketer and field hockey player

Personal information
- Full name: William Frederick Martin Whitelaw
- Born: 16 June 1906; Edinburgh, Midlothian, Scotland
- Died: 3 May 1982 (aged 75); Polton, Midlothian, Scotland
- Batting: Right-handed
- Bowling: Right-arm medium

Domestic team information
- Years: Team
- 1932: Scotland

Career statistics
Competition	First-class
Matches	1
Runs scored	1
Batting average	0.50
100s/50s	–/–
Top score	1
Balls bowled	138
Wickets	2
Bowling average	27.00
5 wickets in innings	–
10 wickets in match	–
Best bowling	2/48
Catches/stumpings	–/–
- Source: Cricinfo, 7 July 2022

William Frederick Martin Whitelaw (16 June 1906 – 3 May 1982) was a Scottish first-class cricketer, cricket administrator, and a field hockey player.

Whitelaw was born in June 1906 at Edinburgh. He was educated at Merchiston Castle School, before matriculating to study law at Balliol College, Oxford. From there, he studied for his master's at the University of Edinburgh. A club cricketer for Grange Cricket Club, he was selected to play for Scotland against Ireland at Greenock in 1932. Batting twice in the match, he was dismissed in the Scottish first innings for a single run by Eddie Ingram, while in their second innings he was dismissed without scoring by Arthur Douglas. With his right-arm medium pace bowling, he took the wickets of Ingram and Frank Reddy in the Irish first innings. He later served as the president of the Scottish Cricket Union in 1955.

In addition to playing cricket, Whitelaw was also a field hockey player and played internationally for Scotland. In his legal career as a solicitor, Whitelaw was a senior partner in the firm Beveridge & Kellas of Leith. He died suddenly in May 1982 at Polton, Midlothian.
