= David Pickeman =

Irish cricketer

Personal information
- Full name: David Chalmers Pickeman
- Born: 8 May 1893; Donnybrook, Ireland
- Died: June 1945 (aged 53); Dublin, Leinster, Ireland
- Batting: Right-handed
- Bowling: Leg break

Domestic team information
- Years: Team
- 1926: Ireland

Career statistics
Competition	First-class
Matches	1
Runs scored	2
Batting average	1.00
100s/50s	–/–
Top score	2
Balls bowled	0
Wickets	–
Bowling average	–
5 wickets in innings	–
10 wickets in match	–
Best bowling	–
Catches/stumpings	1/–
- Source: Cricinfo, 7 November 2018

David Chalmers Pickeman (8 May 1893 – June 1945) was an Irish first-class cricketer.

Pickeman was born at Dublin in May 1893 to William and Janet Pickeman, Scottish immigrants to Ireland. His father was responsible for laying out the course at Portmarnock Golf Club. He served in World War I with the British Army, reaching the rank of Corporal in the Royal Engineers. Following the war, he returned to Ireland and began to play club cricket for Pembroke and occasionally Leinster. He made his debut for Ireland in a minor match against Wales at Cardiff. He made one appearance in first-class cricket for Ireland against Scotland at Glenpark in 1926. Batting twice in the match, Pickeman was dismissed for 2 runs by Gilbert Hole in Ireland's first-innings, while in their second-innings he was dismissed without scoring by Alexander Forrester. He continued to play club cricket in Dublin until 1931. Outside of cricket, he worked as a chemist. He died at Dublin in June 1945.
