= William Whitelaw (disambiguation) =

William Whitelaw, 1st Viscount Whitelaw (1918–1999) was a British Conservative Party politician.

William Whitelaw may also refer to:

- William Whitelaw (Perth MP) (1868–1946), British Conservative politician, grandfather of the above
- William Whitelaw (sportsman) (1906–1982), Scottish first-class cricketer and field hockey player
