= Joseph Peacocke =

Joseph Peacock or Peacocke may refer to:

- Joseph Peacock (architect) (1821–1893), British architect
- Joseph Peacock (politician), South Australian politician and businessman
- Joseph Peacocke (archbishop of Dublin) (1835–1916), Irish Anglican bishop
- Joseph Peacocke (bishop of Derry and Raphoe) (1866–1962), Irish Anglican bishop; son of the above
- Joseph Peacocke (cricketer) (1904–1961), Irish cricketer
