= Arthur Robinson (Irish cricketer) =

Irish cricketer

Personal information
- Full name: Arthur Joseph Herbert Robinson
- Born: 21 April 1899; Rathmines, Ireland
- Died: 12 January 1937 (aged 37); Monkstown, Dublin, Ireland
- Batting: Right-handed

Domestic team information
- Years: Team
- 1924–1929: Ireland
- 1924: Dublin University

Career statistics
Competition	First-class
Matches	7
Runs scored	155
Batting average	12.91
100s/50s	–/–
Top score	32
Balls bowled	0
Wickets	–
Bowling average	–
5 wickets in innings	–
10 wickets in match	–
Best bowling	–
Catches/stumpings	3/–
- Source: Cricinfo, 6 November 2018

Arthur Joseph Herbert Robinson (21 April 1899 – 12 January 1937) was an Irish first-class cricketer.

Robinson was born at Rathmines in April 1899, and was educated at Clongowes Wood College in County Kildare. He entered straight into the British Army as a Second Lieutenant following his schooling, where he served in the latter stages of World War I with the Leinster Regiment. Following the war, he studied at Trinity College Dublin and was a member of Dublin University Cricket Club. He toured England with the university in 1924, playing in one first-class match against Northamptonshire at Rushden. In July 1924, he made his debut for Ireland in a first-class match against Scotland at Dundee. He made five further first-class appearances for Ireland, the last coming in 1929 against Scotland. Playing a total of seven first-class matches, he scored 155 runs at an average of 12.91, with a highest score of 32. Besides playing club cricket in Dublin for Dublin University and Pembroke Cricket Club, his work took him around Ireland, with Robinson also playing for City of Derry and Cork County. He died at Monkstown, Dublin in January 1937.
