= George Wilson (Irish cricketer) =

Irish cricketer

Personal information
- Full name: George Wilson
- Born: 30 June 1916; Ligoniel, Ireland
- Died: 27 April 1995 (aged 78); Glengormley, Northern Ireland
- Batting: Right-handed
- Bowling: Right-arm off break

Domestic team information
- Years: Team
- 1948–1951: Ireland

Career statistics
Competition	First-class
Matches	3
Runs scored	116
Batting average	19.33
100s/50s	–/–
Top score	39
Balls bowled	30
Wickets	2
Bowling average	6.00
5 wickets in innings	–
10 wickets in match	–
Best bowling	2/12
Catches/stumpings	–/–
- Source: Cricinfo, 26 October 2018

George Wilson (30 June 1916 – 27 April 1995) was an Irish first-class cricketer.

Born at Ligoniel near Belfast, Wilson received his education at Belfast Technical College. Playing his club cricket for Woodvale in Belfast, Wilson made his debut in first-class cricket for Ireland against Scotland at Glasgow in 1948. He made two further first-class appearances for Ireland, both against Scotland in 1949 at Belfast, and 1951 at Dublin. Across his three matches, Wilson scored a total of 116 runs at an average of 19.33, with a highest score of 39. He also took two wickets. Outside of cricket, he worked as a draughtsman in an engineering company. He died at Glengormley in April 1995.
