= Burry McMahon =

Irish cricketer

Personal information
- Full name: William John Alexander McMahon
- Born: 13 July 1894; Richill, Ireland
- Died: 24 December 1974 (aged 80); Galway, Connacht, Ireland
- Nickname: Burry
- Batting: Unknown
- Bowling: Unknown

Domestic team information
- Years: Team
- 1925–1926: Dublin University

Career statistics
Competition	First-class
Matches	3
Runs scored	23
Batting average	4.60
100s/50s	–/–
Top score	18
Balls bowled	318
Wickets	2
Bowling average	89.00
5 wickets in innings	–
10 wickets in match	–
Best bowling	2/92
Catches/stumpings	4/–
- Source: Cricinfo, 16 October 2018

William John Alexander McMahon known as Burry McMahon (13 July 1894 – 24 December 1974) was an Irish first-class cricketer.

McMahon was born at Richhill, County Armagh in July 1894. He played three first-class cricket matches for Dublin University, playing all three matches against Northamptonshire. He played once in 1925 at Northampton, and twice in 1926 at Dublin and Northampton. In his three first-class matches, he scored 23 runs and took two wickets. He died at Galway in December 1974.
