= David Trotter (cricketer) =

Irish cricketer

Personal information
- Full name: David North Trotter
- Born: 24 May 1858; Forkhill, Ireland
- Died: 17 March 1912 (aged 53); Dublin, Ireland
- Batting: Right-handed

Career statistics
Competition	First-class
Matches	1
Runs scored	42
Batting average	21.00
100s/50s	–/–
Top score	33
Catches/stumpings	1/–
- Source: Cricinfo, 24 November 2018

David North Trotter (24 May 1858 – 17 March 1912) was an Irish first-class cricketer.

Trotter was born at Forkhill in County Down in May 1858. He played minor matches for Ireland and Dublin University Cricket Club in the 1870s, where he had some success, scoring a century at College Park in 1876 against a United South of England Eleven featuring W. G. Grace, James Southerton and James Lillywhite. Impressed by his performance, Grace invited him to play for the North of England in the annual North v South fixture. He played in the 1877 fixture at Chelsea, in what would be his only appearance in first-class cricket. Trotter played as an opening batsman. He toured North America with the Gentlemen of Ireland in 1879, and continued to play minor matches for Ireland until 1890. He died at a private hospital in Dublin in March 1912, following a long illness.
