= Patrick Maxwell =

Patrick Maxwell may refer to:

- G. Patrick Maxwell, American plastic surgeon
- Paddy Maxwell (1909–1991), Irish solicitor and politician
- Patrick Maxwell (cricketer), played for Dublin University
- Patrick Maxwell (British physician), Regius Professor of Physic at the University of Cambridge
