= Basil Ward (cricketer) =

Irish cricketer

Personal information
- Full name: Basil Jordain Ward
- Born: 6 August 1889; Dublin, Ireland
- Died: 29 March 1972 (aged 82); Wandsworth Common, London, England
- Batting: Left-handed
- Bowling: Left-arm fast-medium

Domestic team information
- Years: Team
- 1912–1920: Ireland

Career statistics
| Competition | First-class |
|---|---|
| Matches | 4 |
| Runs scored | 56 |
| Batting average | 11.20 |
| 100s/50s | –/– |
| Top score | 17 |
| Balls bowled | 751 |
| Wickets | 13 |
| Bowling average | 21.00 |
| 5 wickets in innings | – |
| 10 wickets in match | – |
| Best bowling | 4/66 |
| Catches/stumpings | 3/– |
- Source: Cricinfo, 5 November 2018

Basil Jordain Ward (6 August 1889 – 29 March 1972) was an Irish first-class cricketer.

Ward was born at Dublin in August 1889, where he was educated at Mountjoy School. After finishing his schooling, he went up to Trinity College, Dublin in 1908, where he played club cricket for Dublin University. He did not appear regularly for the university until 1912, but did represent Leinster alongside. Ward made his debut in first-class cricket for Ireland against Scotland at Dublin in 1912. He played in the same fixture in 1913 at Edinburgh, and in 1914 at Dublin. Ward served in the British Army during World War I, enlisting in August 1915 as a Second Lieutenant in the Royal Field Artillery. Surviving the war, he returned to playing club cricket for Dublin University. He made a final first-class appearance for Ireland against Scotland at Edinburgh in 1920, a year in which he also played minor matches against Cambridge University and Derbyshire at College Park, Dublin. Ward played in a total of four first-class matches, scoring 56 runs with a highest score of 17. However, it is a fast-medium bowler that Ward is better remembered, where alongside an impressive club record, he also took 13 first-class wickets at an average of 21.00, with best innings figures of 4 for 66. A schoolteacher by profession, he took up a teaching position in London soon after his final appearance for Ireland. He died at Wandsworth Common in London in March 1972.
