= Tangier Assignment =

1955 film

- Directed by: César Fernández Ardavín
- Written by: Ted Leversuch; Juan Traveller
- Produced by: Richard Fleischer; Cyril Parker
- Starring: Fernando Rey; Bob Simmons; Gustavo Re
- Cinematography: Stan Lipinski; Alfonso Nieva
- Edited by: Frank Gilpin; Petra de Nieva
- Music by: Guillermo Lazcano; Ronnie O'Dell
- Production companies: Hesperia Films S.A. Rock Pictures
- Distributed by: New Realm Pictures; Mercurio Films
- Release date: 25 July 1955
- Running time: 82 minutes
- Countries: Spain; United Kingdom
- Language: Spanish

Tangier Assignment (Spanish: Billete para Tánger) is a 1955 British-Spanish crime film directed by César Fernández Ardavín and starring Fernando Rey, Bob Simmons and Gustavo Re. The film's sets were designed by the art director Tomás Fernández. Location shooting took place around Tangier in Morocco.

== Synopsis ==
An agent goes undercover in Morocco to investigate a smuggling ring, joining forces with a nightclub singer and local police inspector.

== Cast ==
- Fernando Rey as Inspector
- Bob Simmons as Peter Valentine
- June Powell as Vicky
- Bill Brandon as Willie
- Ricardo Picazo as Baron
- Gustavo Re as Schuman / Abdul
- Zoraida as Dancer

== Bibliography ==
- Chibnall, Steve & Murphy, Robert. British Crime Cinema. Routledge, 2005.
- Clinton, Franz Anthony. British Thrillers, 1950–1979: 845 Films of Suspense, Mystery, Murder and Espionage. McFarland, 2020.
