= Edward Morant =

Edward Morant may refer to:

- Edward Morant (politician) (1730–1791), British politician and plantation owner
- Edward Morant (cricketer, born 1772) (1772–1855), English amateur cricketer
- Edward Morant (cricketer, born 1868) (1868–1910), English cricketer and diplomatic attaché
