= Arthur Ross (cricketer) =

Irish cricketer

Personal information
- Full name: Arthur Patrick Aloysius Ross
- Born: 21 January 1872; Dublin, Ireland
- Died: Unknown
- Batting: Unknown

Domestic team information
- Years: Team
- 1895: Dublin University

Career statistics
Competition	First-class
Matches	2
Runs scored	22
Batting average	5.50
100s/50s	–/–
Top score	11
Catches/stumpings	–/–
- Source: Cricinfo, 2 November 2018

Arthur Patrick Aloysius Ross (21 January 1872 – date of death unknown) was an Irish first-class cricketer.

Ross made two appearances in first-class cricket for Dublin University in 1895. Both of his appearances came against Cambridge University, with the first fixture being played at Cambridge, and the second at Dublin. He scored a total of 22 runs across his two matches, with a highest score of 11. His date of death is unknown.
