= Myer Hoffman =

English-born Irish cricketer

Personal information
- Full name: Myer Hoffman
- Born: 21 July 1902; Leeds, Yorkshire, England
- Died: 14 October 1959 (aged 57); Lourenco Marques, Portuguese Mozambique
- Batting: Right-handed
- Bowling: Right-arm medium

Domestic team information
- Years: Team
- 1925: Dublin University

Career statistics
Competition	First-class
Matches	1
Runs scored	6
Batting average	6.00
100s/50s	–/–
Top score	6*
Balls bowled	18
Wickets	0
Bowling average	–
5 wickets in innings	–
10 wickets in match	–
Best bowling	–
Catches/stumpings	–/–
- Source: Cricinfo, 2 January 2022

Myer Hoffman (21 July 1902 in Leeds, Yorkshire, England – 14 October 1959 in Lourenço Marques, Mozambique) was an English-born Irish cricketer. A right-handed batsman and right-arm medium pace bowler, he played one first-class match, for Dublin University against Northamptonshire in July 1925.
