= David McKibbin =

Irish cricketer

Personal information
- Full name: David Gordon Robinson McKibbin
- Born: 16 June 1991; Comber, Northern Ireland
- Died: 14 June 1991 (aged 78); Comber, Northern Ireland
- Batting: Right-handed
- Bowling: Leg break

Domestic team information
- Years: Team
- 1937: Ireland

Career statistics
Competition	First-class
Matches	1
Runs scored	46
Batting average	23.00
100s/50s	–/–
Top score	31
Catches/stumpings	–/–
- Source: Cricinfo, 16 October 2018

David Gordon Robinson McKibbin (16 June 1912 – 14 June 1991) was an Irish first-class cricketer.

Born at Comber in June 1912, McKibbin was educated at Mill School, Comber. A mainstay of the successful North Down side of the 1930s, McKibbin was selected to play one first-class match for Ireland against Scotland in 1937 at Belfast. Opening the batting, he scored 31 runs in Ireland's first-innings, before being dismissed by John Melville; in their second-innings he was dismissed by the same bowler for 15, with Ireland winning by 63 runs. He died at Comber in June 1991, two days short of his 79th birthday.
