= Joseph Peacocke (cricketer) =

Irish cricketer

Personal information
- Full name: Joseph Reginald Hyde Peacocke
- Born: 23 May 1904; Dublin, Ireland
- Died: December 1961 (aged 57); Umtali, Federation of Rhodesia and Nyasaland
- Batting: Right-handed
- Bowling: Right-arm medium

Domestic team information
- Years: Team
- 1926: Ireland
- 1925: Dublin University

Career statistics
| Competition | First-class |
|---|---|
| Matches | 2 |
| Runs scored | 86 |
| Batting average | 21.50 |
| 100s/50s | –/– |
| Top score | 48 |
| Catches/stumpings | –/– |
- Source: Cricinfo, 7 November 2018

Joseph Reginald Hyde Peacocke (23 March 1904 – December 1961) was an Irish first-class cricketer.

Peacocke was born at Dublin in March 1904, and was educated in England at Rossall School. After finishing his schooling at Rossall, he returned to Ireland to study at Trinity College, Dublin. Joining the Dublin University Cricket Club, he accompanied the team on their 1925 tour of England, where he played in a first-class match against Northamptonshire at Northampton. The following year, he played a first-class match for Ireland against Scotland at Glenpark. Across his two first-class matches, Peacocke scored 86 runs with a highest score of 48. Besides playing club cricket for Dublin University, he also played a few matches for Phoenix. By the early 1930s, his work was taking him to different parts of the British Empire. In 1931, while in Egypt, he played a minor match for Gezira Sports Club at Cairo. In 1933, while in British India, he played a minor match for Punjab and North West Frontier against the Free Foresters at Lahore. He died at Umtali in the Federation of Rhodesia and Nyasaland in December 1961, today modern day Zimbabwe.
