= Henry Morgan (cricketer) =

Irish cricketer

Personal information
- Full name: Henry Randolph Morgan
- Born: 6 July 1907; Belfast, Ireland
- Died: 9 August 1987 (aged 80); Belfast, Northern Ireland
- Batting: Right-handed
- Bowling: Right-arm medium-fast

Domestic team information
- Years: Team
- 1931–1938: Ireland

Career statistics
Competition	First-class
Matches	4
Runs scored	54
Batting average	10.80
100s/50s	–/–
Top score	21
Balls bowled	642
Wickets	18
Bowling average	10.38
5 wickets in innings	1
10 wickets in match	1
Best bowling	7/41
Catches/stumpings	2/–
- Source: Cricinfo, 7 November 2018

Henry Randolph Morgan (6 July 1907 – 9 August 1987) was an Irish first-class cricketer.

Morgan was born at Belfast in July 1907, to Richard Morgan and his Cork born wife, Eileen. He was the sixth of eight brothers, alongside three sisters. He was educated in Belfast at the Belfast Royal Academy. He initially played his club cricket for Ulster, however when they folded, he joined North Down in 1932. He made his debut in first-class cricket for Ireland against Scotland at Dublin in 1931. He made three further first-class appearances for Ireland, all coming against Scotland in 1933, 1937 and 1938. A medium-fast bowler with a good off cutter delivery, Morgan took 18 wickets in his four first-class matches, at an average of 10.38. His best innings figures were 7/41 in the 1933 match, with Morgan taking match figures of 10/81. He also scored 54 runs with a highest score of 21. He played club cricket into the 1940s, also playing for North of Ireland, Muckamore, and Eglinton. Outside of cricket, he worked as a manager. He died at Belfast in August 1987.
