= Cecil Pemberton (cricketer) =

Irish cricketer

Personal information
- Full name: William Cecil Pemberton
- Born: 15 November 1898; Dublin, Ireland
- Died: 25 December 1978 (aged 80); Dublin, Leinster, Ireland
- Batting: Right-handed
- Bowling: Left-arm fast-medium

Domestic team information
- Years: Team
- 1923–1928: Ireland

Career statistics
Competition	First-class
Matches	4
Runs scored	55
Batting average	13.75
100s/50s	–/–
Top score	31
Balls bowled	666
Wickets	5
Bowling average	52.60
5 wickets in innings	–
10 wickets in match	–
Best bowling	3/40
Catches/stumpings	1/–
- Source: Cricinfo, 7 November 2018

William Cecil Pemberton (15 November 1898 – 25 December 1978) was an Irish first-class cricketer.

Pemberton was born at Dublin in March 1904 to Benjamin and Rosannah Pemberton, the fifth of seven children. He was educated at Christ Church Cathedral Grammar School. Pemberton began his club cricket as an opening fast-medium bowler for Civil Service (Dublin). He made his debut in first-class cricket for Ireland against Scotland at Dublin. Following a successful season with Civil Service in 1923, in which he took 90% of the clubs wickets and helped guide them to second place in the Leinster Senior League, Pemberton became involved in an internal dispute at the club and left with several other players. He joined Clontarf the following season. He made his second first-class appearance for Ireland against Wales at Belfast in 1926, and followed this up with a further two first-class appearances in 1928 against Scotland at Edinburgh, and the Marylebone Cricket Club at Dublin. He was unable to bring his wicket-taking prowess from club cricket into first-class cricket, taking 5 wickets at an average of 52.60, with best figures of 3/40. He also scored 55 runs, with a high score of 31. Continuing to play club cricket, he played for Clontarf until 1935, after which he joined Leinster. He played for Leinster until 1940, before seemingly retiring from playing, however ten years later he played one more match for Clontarf. By the end of his club career, he had taken 575 wickets at an impressive average of 14.84. He died at Dublin in December 1978.
