= Charles Posnett =

Irish cricketer

Personal information
- Full name: Charles Edward Posnett
- Born: 29 May 1914; Belfast, Ireland
- Died: 27 August 1997 (aged 83); Belfast, Northern Ireland
- Batting: Right-handed

Domestic team information
- Years: Team
- 1947: Ireland

Career statistics
Competition	First-class
Matches	1
Runs scored	46
Batting average	23.00
100s/50s	–/–
Top score	26
Balls bowled	0
Wickets	–
Bowling average	–
5 wickets in innings	–
10 wickets in match	–
Best bowling	–
Catches/stumpings	1/–
- Source: Cricinfo, 22 October 2018

Charles Edward Posnett (29 May 1914 – 25 August 1997) was an Irish first-class cricketer.

Posnett was born at Belfast and was educated in the city at Connell's Institute. A club cricketer for Woodvale and Downpatrick, he made one appearance in first-class cricket for Ireland against Derbyshire at Buxton during Ireland's 1947 tour of England. Batting twice during the match, he joint top scored with 26 runs alongside Stuart Pollock, before being dismissed by Dusty Rhodes, while in their second-innings he was dismissed for 20 runs by Eric Marsh. All six of his appearances for Ireland came in 1947, with Posnett also featuring in five minor fixtures, including three matches against the touring South Africans played at Belfast and Dublin. Outside of cricket, Posnett worked as a council sanitary official. He died at Belfast in August 1997.
