= Cyril Parker =

Irish cricketer (1897–1962)

Personal information
- Full name: Cyril Brien Dennis Parker
- Born: 6 May 1897; Rathgar, Ireland
- Died: 21 December 1962 (aged 65); Blackrock, Leinster, Ireland
- Batting: Right-handed

Domestic team information
- Years: Team
- 1922: Dublin University

Career statistics
Competition	First-class
Matches	1
Runs scored	42
Batting average	21.00
100s/50s	–/–
Top score	29
Catches/stumpings	–/–
- Source: Cricinfo, 22 October 2018

Cyril Brien Dennis Parker (6 May 1897 – 21 December 1962) was an Irish first-class cricketer.

Born at Rathgar near Dublin, Parker made a single appearance in first-class cricket for Dublin University against Essex at Brentwood during Dublin University's tour 1922 tour of England. Batting twice during the match, Parker was dismissed for 27 runs in Ireland's first-innings by Joseph Dixon, while in their second-innings he was dismissed again by the same bowler for 13 runs.
