= Denis Leng =

English cricketer (1934–2020)

Personal information
- Full name: Denis Leng
- Born: 26 November 1934; Pudsey, Yorkshire, England
- Died: September 2020 (aged 85); Baildon, Yorkshire, England
- Batting: Right-handed
- Bowling: Right-arm fast-medium

Domestic team information
- Years: Team
- 1966: Ireland

Career statistics
| Competition | First-class |
|---|---|
| Matches | 1 |
| Runs scored | 1 |
| Batting average | 1.00 |
| 100s/50s | –/– |
| Top score | 1 |
| Balls bowled | 102 |
| Wickets | 1 |
| Bowling average | 36.00 |
| 5 wickets in innings | – |
| 10 wickets in match | – |
| Best bowling | 1/36 |
| Catches/stumpings | 1/– |
- Source: Cricinfo, 1 December 2021

Denis Leng (26 November 1934 — September 2020) was an English first-class cricketer.

Leng was born at Pudsey in November 1934 and was educated there at Primrose Hill Secondary Modern School. He played club cricket in the Bradford League for Farsley Cricket Club. Following a successful 1964 season for Farsley, in which he took 48 wickets with his right-arm fast-medium bowling, Leng was engaged by Cork County Cricket Club in Ireland the following season. With the commencement of the Guinness Cup in 1966, Leng was selected to lead the Munster bowling attack. Following good interprovincial returns, Leng was selected to play for Ireland later in the 1966 season in a first-class match against the Marylebone Cricket Club (MCC) at Dublin. He took one wicket in the match, that of Michael Eagar, finishing with match figures of 1 for 36. He also batted twice in the match, ending the Irish first innings unbeaten without scoring and in their second innings he was dismissed for a single run by J. A. Bailey.

Although this was his only first-class appearance, he continued to play minor matches for Ireland until 1968. In 1967 he led the Irish attack against Worcestershire in the absence of Alec O'Riordan, with Leng touring England later in the season where he played against the MCC at Lord's and the Combined Services at Aldershot, where amongst those he dismissed was John Baskervyle-Glegg. He played his final two matches for Ireland in 1968, both against the touring Australians. In Irish domestic cricket he transferred from Munster to South Leinster in 1970 and in 1971. He returned to England in 1972, where he resumed playing club cricket in the Bradford League. Outside of cricket, by profession he worked in the textile industry. He was married to Margaret, with whom he had three children. Leng died in September 2020, after a long period of ill-health involving dementia and other illnesses.
