= Paddy Waldron =

Irish cricketer

Personal information
- Full name: Patrick Henry Pearse Waldron
- Born: 5 February 1917; Limerick, Ireland
- Died: 26 December 2008 (aged 91); Dublin, Ireland
- Batting: Right-handed

Domestic team information
- Years: Team
- 1946–1947: Ireland

Career statistics
Competition	First-class
Matches	4
Runs scored	99
Batting average	12.37
100s/50s	–/–
Top score	32
Balls bowled	0
Wickets	–
Bowling average	–
5 wickets in innings	–
10 wickets in match	–
Best bowling	–
Catches/stumpings	–/–
- Source: Cricinfo, 7 November 2018

Patrick Henry Pearse Waldron (5 February 1917 – 26 December 2008) was an Irish first-class cricketer.

Waldron was born at Limerick in February 1917, and was educated at Catholic University School, Dublin. Obtaining a special dispensation from the Archbishop of Dublin, he attended law lectures at Trinity College. Playing his club cricket in Dublin for Merrion, Waldron made his debut in first-class cricket for Ireland against Scotland at Greenock in 1946. He made three further first-class appearances for Ireland, all in 1947. One of these came against Scotland at Cork, while the other two came against Yorkshire and Derbyshire on Ireland's tour of England. Across his four first-class matches, Waldron scored 99 runs at an average of 12.37, with a highest score of 32. After completing his legal studies, he was called to the bar at the King's Inns in 1948 and continued to work as a registrar at the Four Courts. He continued to play club cricket for Merrion until 1953, having debuted for the club in 1936. At the time of his death in 2008, he was the oldest surviving Irish first-class cricketer, having succeeded Noel Mahony following his death in 2006.
