= Stuart Smith (cricketer) =

Irish cricketer

Personal information
- Full name: Stuart Campbell Smith
- Born: 19 September 1868; Rathmines, Ireland
- Died: Unknown
- Batting: Left-handed

Domestic team information
- Years: Team
- 1907–1908: Ireland

Career statistics
Competition	First-class
Matches	3
Runs scored	19
Batting average	3.16
100s/50s	–/–
Top score	11
Catches/stumpings	2/–
- Source: Cricinfo, 5 November 2018

Stuart Campbell Smith (19 September 1868 – date of death unknown) was an Irish first-class cricketer.

Smith was born at Rathmines in Dublin in August 1868. A high scoring batsman in club cricket for Leinster, Smith first appeared for Ireland in a minor match against I Zingari at Dublin in 1891 (four years earlier he had played for the Gentlemen of Ireland against the Gentlemen of Canada). He continued to appear regularly for Ireland in minor cricket from 1891–1908. He made his debut in first-class cricket for Ireland at the age of 40, against the touring South Africans at Dublin. He played two further first-class matches for Ireland in 1908 at Dublin, against the touring Gentlemen of Philadelphia, and Yorkshire. Despite being a heavy scorer at club level, he failed to repeat this at first-class level, scoring just 19 runs at an average of 3.16 across his three matches. He played for Stanley Cochrane's Woodbrook Club and Ground in a minor match against Hampshire in 1909.
