= Ciaran Ó Máille =

Irish cricketer and field hockey player

Personal information
- Full name: Ciaran Ó Máille
- Born: 14 June 1925; Dublin, Leinster, Ireland
- Died: 14 March 1977 (aged 51); Dublin, Leinster, Ireland
- Batting: Right-handed

Domestic team information
- Years: Team
- 1953–1960: Ireland

Career statistics
| Competition | First-class |
|---|---|
| Matches | 2 |
| Runs scored | 10 |
| Batting average | 5.00 |
| 100s/50s | –/– |
| Top score | 5 |
| Balls bowled | 0 |
| Wickets | – |
| Bowling average | – |
| 5 wickets in innings | – |
| 10 wickets in match | – |
| Best bowling | – |
| Catches/stumpings | 2/– |
- Source: Cricinfo, 22 October 2018

Ciaran Ó Máille (14 June 1925 – 4 March 1977) was an Irish first-class cricketer and field hockey international.

Ó Máille was born at Dublin and was educated at Blackrock College. A mainstay of the Pembroke side for nearly twenty years, Ó Máille made two appearances in first-class cricket for Ireland, debuting in 1953 against Scotland at Belfast. A gap of seven years followed before his next first-class appearance against the Marylebone Cricket Club at Dublin in 1960. He scored 10 runs across three first-class innings. Ó Máille was also a hockey international for Ireland. He died aged 51 at Dublin in March 1977.
