= John Christie (cricketer) =

Scottish cricketer

Personal information
- Full name: John Cubie Christie
- Born: 12 July 1903; Edinburgh, Midlothian, Scotland
- Died: 27 May 1978 (aged 74); Wroxham, Norfolk, England
- Batting: Right-handed
- Bowling: Unknown

Domestic team information
- Years: Team
- 1923: Scotland

Career statistics
Competition	First-class
Matches	2
Runs scored	13
Batting average	13.00
100s/50s	–/–
Top score	11*
Balls bowled	258
Wickets	6
Bowling average	22.00
5 wickets in innings	–
10 wickets in match	–
Best bowling	3/31
Catches/stumpings	3/–
- Source: Cricinfo, 22 October 2022

John Cubie Christie (12 July 1903 — 27 May 1978) was a Scottish first-class cricketer.

Christie was born at Edinburgh in July 1903, and was educated at the High School of Glasgow. A club cricketer for Glasgow High School Former Pupils, he made two appearances in first-class cricket for Scotland in 1923, against Ireland at Dublin and Wales at Perth. Playing as a bowler in the Scottish side, Christie took 6 wickets at an average of exactly 22, with best figures of 3 for 31. Outside of cricket, Christie was a coal merchant. He died in England at Wroxham in May 1978.
