= Frank Reddy =

Irish cricketer

Personal information
- Full name: Francis James Anthony Reddy
- Born: 15 June 1906; Harold's Cross, Ireland
- Died: 11 December 1991 (aged 85); Dublin, Leinster, Ireland
- Batting: Right-handed
- Bowling: Right-arm medium

Domestic team information
- Years: Team
- 1931–1939: Ireland

Career statistics
Competition	First-class
Matches	7
Runs scored	202
Batting average	16.83
100s/50s	–/1
Top score	50*
Catches/stumpings	11/–
- Source: Cricinfo, 1 November 2018

Francis 'Frank' James Anthony Reddy (15 June 1906 – 11 December 1991) was an Irish first-class cricketer.

Reddy was born at Harold's Cross near Dublin in June 1906. He was educated at St Mary's College in Rathmines, when that school closed, he attended Catholic University School. Playing his club cricket for Phoenix, Reddy made his debut for Ireland in a minor match against The Catamarans in 1929, before playing a minor match against the Marylebone Cricket Club (MCC) in 1930. In 1931, he made his debut in first-class cricket for Ireland against Scotland at College Park. He played in the same fixture the following year at Greenock. A gap of four years followed before his next appearances in first-class cricket, when he played three matches against Scotland, the touring Indians, and the MCC. He played two more first-class matches, in 1937 against the English Minor Counties cricket team, and in 1939 against Scotland. He scored 202 runs in his seven first-class matches, at an average of 16.83, with a high score of 50 not out. This score, which was his only first-class half century, came against Scotland in 1932. Outside of cricket, he worked as an insurance company executive. He died at Dublin in December 1991.
