= Herbert Rollins =

Irish cricketer

Personal information
- Full name: Herbert Rollins
- Born: 29 December 1899; Dublin, Ireland
- Died: 17 June 1921 (aged 21); Dublin, Ireland
- Batting: Right-handed

Domestic team information
- Years: Team
- 1920: Ireland

Career statistics
Competition	First-class
Matches	1
Runs scored	11
Batting average	5.50
100s/50s	–/–
Top score	8
Balls bowled	0
Wickets	–
Bowling average	–
5 wickets in innings	–
10 wickets in match	–
Best bowling	–
Catches/stumpings	1/–
- Source: Cricinfo, 7 November 2018

Herbert Rollins (29 December 1899 – 17 June 1921) was an Irish first-class cricketer.

Rollins was born at Dublin in December 1899, where he was educated at St. Andrew's College. He went up to Trinity College, Dublin in 1917, but left the following year to join the newly formed Royal Air Force in the latter stages of World War I. He returned to Trinity College after the war, becoming a member of the Dublin University Cricket Club. He made one appearance in first-class cricket for Ireland against Scotland at Edinburgh in 1920. Opening the batting in both of Ireland's innings, he scored 3 runs in their first-innings, before being dismissed by Thomas Watt, while in their second-innings he was dismissed by the same bowler for 8 runs. In just over two seasons playing club cricket for Dublin University, he was able to amass over 1,500 runs. He fell ill with meningitis mid-way through the 1921 cricket season, and died in June of that year from the disease. A scorebox stood in his honour in College Park until it was destroyed by fire in 1963.
