= Edward Seymour (Irish cricketer) =

Irish cricketer

Personal information
- Full name: Edward Neville Seymour
- Born: 14 January 1906; Dublin, Ireland
- Died: 12 February 1980 (aged 74); Dublin, Leinster, Ireland
- Batting: Right-handed
- Bowling: Right-arm fast-medium

Domestic team information
- Years: Team
- 1927–1928: Ireland

Career statistics
Competition	First-class
Matches	3
Runs scored	9
Batting average	1.80
100s/50s	–/–
Top score	3
Balls bowled	270
Wickets	4
Bowling average	36.75
5 wickets in innings	–
10 wickets in match	–
Best bowling	2/26
Catches/stumpings	1/–
- Source: Cricinfo, 1 November 2018

Edward Neville Seymour (14 January 1906 – 12 February 1980) was an Irish first-class cricketer.

Seymour was born at Dublin in January 1906, and was educated in the city at the Masonic Boys' School. Playing his club cricket for Clontarf, Seymour made his debut in first-class cricket for Ireland against Scotland at Dublin in 1927. He made two further first-class appearances in 1928, against the touring West Indians at Dublin, and Scotland at Edinburgh. In the 1928 match against Scotland, he was no-balled for throwing, and did not play for Ireland again. Playing as a fast-medium bowler, he took four wickets in his three first-class matches, with best figures of 2/26. Outside of cricket, he worked for Gouldings' Fertilisers. He died at Dublin in December 1980.
