= Percy Ross (cricketer) =

Irish cricketer

Personal information
- Full name: Percy C Ross
- Born: Unknown; Ireland
- Died: Unknown; Ireland
- Batting: Right-handed
- Bowling: Right-arm medium

Domestic team information
- Years: Team
- 1912: Ireland

Career statistics
Competition	First-class
Matches	1
Runs scored	29
Batting average	14.50
100s/50s	–/–
Top score	26
Balls bowled	138
Wickets	2
Bowling average	49.50
5 wickets in innings	–
10 wickets in match	–
Best bowling	2/99
Catches/stumpings	–/–
- Source: Cricinfo, 7 November 2018

Percy C Ross (dates of birth and death unknown) was an Irish first-class cricketer.

A leading member of Cork County in the first decade of the 1900s, Ross made his debut for Ireland in a minor match against Cambridge University at Cork in 1904. He later made played one first-class match for Ireland against the touring South Africans at Woodbrook in 1912. Batting twice in the match, Ross top-scored with 26 runs in Ireland's first-innings, before being dismissed by Aubrey Faulkner, while in their second-innings he was dismissed by Claude Carter for 3 runs. With his medium pace bowling, he took the wickets of Herbie Taylor and Frank Mitchell, taking figures of 2/99 from 23 overs. He did not play for Ireland again.
