= James McKelvey =

Irish cricketer and rugby union player (born 1933)

Personal information
- Full name: James Moorhead McKelvey
- Born: 2 April 1933; Belfast, Northern Ireland
- Batting: Left-handed

Domestic team information
- Years: Team
- 1954: Ireland

Career statistics
Competition	First-class
Matches	2
Runs scored	25
Batting average	6.25
100s/50s	0/0
Top score	9
Balls bowled	0
Wickets	–
Bowling average	–
5 wickets in innings	–
10 wickets in match	–
Best bowling	–
Catches/stumpings	1/–
- Source: Cricinfo, 2 November 2018

James Moorhead McKelvey (born 2 April 1933) was an Irish first-class cricketer and rugby union international.

McKelvey was born at Belfast in April 1933, where he was educated at Campbell College. After completing his studies at Campbell College, he went up to Queen's University Belfast to study medicine. While studying at the Queen's, McKelvey played club cricket for Queen's University Cricket Club, as well as playing rugby union for Queen's University RFC. He played two first-class cricket matches for Ireland in 1954, against Scotland at Paisley, and the Marylebone Cricket Club at Dublin. He scored a total of 25 runs in these two matches. Having excelled playing rugby union for Queen's, McKelvey played two Test matches for Ireland in the 1956 Five Nations Championship, against France at Colombes, and England at Twickenham. After graduating from Queen's, McKelvey worked as a well respected general practitioner in Saintfield, County Down. He continued to play club cricket for North of Ireland, and in retirement he served as the president of the Ulster branch of the Irish Rugby Football Union.
