= Bob Simmons (stunt man) =

British stunt man (1923–1987)

Bob Simmons as James Bond 007 in the gun barrel sequence featured in the movies Dr. No, From Russia with Love, and Goldfinger

Bob Simmons (Fulham, London, England, 31 March 1923 – 21 October 1987) was an English actor and stunt man who worked in many British-made films, most notably the James Bond series.

== Biography ==
Simmons was a former Army Physical Training Instructor at Royal Military Academy Sandhurst who had initially planned to be an actor, but thought a career in performing stunts would be more lucrative and interesting. Simmons first worked for Albert R. Broccoli and Irving Allen's Warwick Films on the film The Red Beret, that included future Bond film regulars director Terence Young, screenwriter Richard Maibaum and cameraman, later director of photography Ted Moore. Simmons later worked in many other Warwick Films, and worked for Allen in his The Long Ships and Genghis Khan, where he had his eye injured when kicked by a horse.

When Albert R. Broccoli began to produce the James Bond films, Simmons tested as an actor for the Bond role, but until his death in 1987, he became the stunt coordinator for every Bond film except From Russia with Love, which he joined later in the production, On Her Majesty's Secret Service and The Man with the Golden Gun. He appeared in the gun barrel sequence for Sean Connery in three James Bond films: Dr. No, From Russia with Love, and Goldfinger. Simmons is the only person to officially perform the scene, while not starring in the main role as James Bond. Simmons was also Connery's stunt double. Simmons also had a role as SPECTRE agent Jacques Bouvar in the pre-title sequence of the fourth film, Thunderball.

Simmons developed a stunt technique involving trampolines, first used in You Only Live Twice, whereby stuntmen would bounce off a trampoline in concert with a triggered explosion so as to simulate being blown into the air. This was used in many other films, including by Simmons again in The Wild Geese, where Simmons also doubled for Richard Burton.

Upon retirement, Simmons wrote an autobiography entitled Nobody Does It Better titled after the theme song for the 1977 Bond film The Spy Who Loved Me. He died on 21 October 1987.

== Filmography ==
- Reform School (1939) - Johnny
- Ivanhoe (1952, stunt)
- The Flanagan Boy (1953) - Booth Man (uncredited)
- The Sword and the Rose (1953) - French Champion
- Tangier Assignment (1955) - Peter Valentine
- No Time to Die (1958) - Mustapha
- A Night to Remember (1958) - Stoker (uncredited)
- The Great Van Robbery (1959) - Peters
- And the Same to You (1960) - Perce's Opponent
- Exodus (1960) - Man of arms (uncredited)
- Fury at Smugglers' Bay (1961) - Carlos, a pirate
- The Guns of Navarone (1961, stunt) - German Officer (uncredited)
- The Road to Hong Kong (1962) - Astronaut (uncredited)
- Dr. No (1962, stunt) - James Bond in Gunbarrel Sequence (uncredited)
- Sparrows Can't Sing (1963) - Pub Patron (uncredited)
- From Russia with Love (1963, stunt) - James Bond in Gunbarrel Sequence (uncredited)
- The Long Ships (1964)
- Goldfinger (1964, stunt) - James Bond in Gunbarrel Sequence (uncredited)
- Thunderball (1965, stunt) - Colonel Jacques Bouvar - SPECTRE #6 (uncredited)
- A Funny Thing Happened on the Way to the Forum (1966)
- You Only Live Twice (1967, stunt)
- Shalako (1968, stunt)
- The Adventurers (1969)
- Murphy's War (1971) - member of German sub crew (uncredited)
- When Eight Bells Toll (1971, stunt)
- Diamonds Are Forever (1971, stunt)
- Live and Let Die (1973, stunt)
- Potato Fritz (1976)
- The Next Man (1976) - London Assassin
- The Spy Who Loved Me (1977, stunt) - Ivan, KGB Thug (uncredited)
- The Wild Geese (1978, stunt) - Pilot (uncredited)
- For Your Eyes Only (1981, stunt) - Henchman Lotus Explosion Victim (uncredited) (final film role)
- A View to a Kill (1985, stunt)
