= Wilfred McDonough =

Personal information
- Full name: Samuel Wilfred McDonough
- Born: 8 October 1899; Armagh, Ireland
- Died: 19 May 1983 (aged 83); Bangor, Northern Ireland
- Batting: Right-handed
- Role: Occasional wicket-keeper

Domestic team information
- Years: Team
- 1930: Ireland

Career statistics
Competition	First-class
Matches	1
Runs scored	61
Batting average	30.50
100s/50s	–/–
Top score	48
Catches/stumpings	–/–
- Source: Cricinfo, 24 October 2011

Samuel Wilfred McDonough (8 October 1899 – 19 May 1983) was an Irish cricketer. McDonough was a right-handed batsman who occasionally fielded as a wicket-keeper. He was born at Armagh was educated at The Royal School, Armagh.

Following success in club cricket for Armagh, McDonough was selected to play in Ireland's first-class match against Scotland in 1930. The Irish batsman struggled in this match against the Scottish fast bowler Arthur Baxter, though opening the batting McDonough himself scored 13 runs in the Irish first-innings before falling victim to Baxter, while in their second-innings he top scored with 48 before Stuart Hiddleston.

Outside of cricket he was employed as a Gas Company Manager, then as a school bursar. He died at Bangor, Northern Ireland on 19 May 1983.
