= William McKee (cricketer) =

Irish cricketer

Personal information
- Full name: William Alexander McKee
- Born: Q4 1919; Coleraine, Northern Ireland
- Died: September 1986 (aged 66/67); Ireland
- Batting: Right-handed
- Bowling: Right-arm fast-medium

Domestic team information
- Years: Team
- 1946: Ireland

Career statistics
Competition	First-class
Matches	1
Runs scored	16
Batting average	16.00
100s/50s	–/–
Top score	16
Balls bowled	114
Wickets	0
Bowling average	–
5 wickets in innings	–
10 wickets in match	–
Best bowling	–
Catches/stumpings	2/–
- Source: Cricinfo, 16 October 2018

William Alexander McKee (Q4 1919 – September 1986) was an Irish first-class cricketer.

Born at Coleraine in the fourth quarter of 1919, McKee played one first-class cricket match for Ireland against Scotland in 1946 at Greenock. He scored 16 runs in the match and went wicket-less with his right-arm fast-medium bowling. He died in September 1986.
