= Michael Reith =

Irish cricketer (1948–2025)

Personal information
- Full name: Michael Stevens Reith
- Born: 2 May 1948; Lurgan, Northern Ireland
- Died: 15 November 2025 (aged 77); Portadown, Northern Ireland
- Batting: Left-handed
- Bowling: Right-arm medium

Domestic team information
- Years: Team
- 1970–1980: Ireland

Career statistics
Competition	First-class	List A
Matches	9	1
Runs scored	346	0
Batting average	21.62	0.00
100s/50s	0/2	0/0
Top score	82	0
Balls bowled	162	0
Wickets	1	–
Bowling average	56.00	–
5 wickets in innings	0	–
10 wickets in match	0	–
Best bowling	1/24	–
Catches/stumpings	5/–	1/–
- Source: Cricinfo, 1 November 2018

Michael Stevens Reith (2 May 1948 – 15 November 2025) was an Irish first-class cricketer.

== Biography ==
Reith was born on 2 May 1948 in Lurgan, and was educated there at Lurgan College. Playing his club cricket for Waringstown, Reith made his debut in first-class cricket for Ireland against Scotland at Perth in 1970. He played nine matches of first-class cricket for Ireland between 1970 and 1980. He scored a total of 346 runs, with a batting average of 21.62, and a highest score of 82. This score, which was one of two first-class half centuries he made, came on debut in 1970. In July 1980, Reith played in Ireland's first-ever List A match against Middlesex in the Gillette Cup at Lord's. Opening the batting alongside Jack Short, Reith became the first Irishman to be dismissed for a duck in List A cricket, when he was dismissed first ball by Wayne Daniel. Outside of cricket, he worked as a manager in the leisure industry, specifically for the Banbridge Area Council.

Reith died at Craigavon Area Hospital, Portadown, on 15 November 2025, at the age of 77.
