= Wilfred Bourchier =

Irish cricketer (1884–1973)

Wilfrid Bourchier
Cricket information
- Batting: Right-handed

International information
- National side: Ireland

Career statistics
Competition	First-class
Matches	3
Runs scored	47
Batting average	7.83
100s/50s	0/0
Top score	19
Catches/stumpings	0/–
- Source: CricketArchive, 6 December 2022

Wilfrid la Rive Rive Bourchier (22 March 1884 – 7 September 1973) was an Irish cricketer. He made his debut for Ireland against Philadelphia in August 1908, and went on to play for them on four occasions, the last coming against Scotland in July 1909. Three of his four matches had first-class status.
