= Thomas Harpur =

Irish cricketer

- Born: 6/5/1944; Sion Hills Co. Tyrone Ireland
- Occupation: Cricket
- Years active: Two Years
- Known for: Irish Cricket

Thomas Harpur
Cricket information
- Batting: Right-handed

International information
- National side: Ireland

Career statistics
Competition	First-class	List A
Matches	2	2
Runs scored	10	1
Batting average	5.00	0.50
100s/50s	0/0	0/0
Top score	6	1
Balls bowled	18	–
Wickets	0	–
Bowling average	–	–
5 wickets in innings	–	–
10 wickets in match	–	–
Best bowling	–	–
Catches/stumpings	2/–	0/–
- Source: CricketArchive, 16 November 2022

Thomas Harpur (born 16 May 1944) is an Irish former cricketer. A right-handed batsman, he played eighteen times for the Ireland cricket team between 1974 and 1982, including two first-class matches and two List A matches.

== Playing career ==
Harpur first played for Ireland in August 1974, scoring 0 not out against Wales in Colwyn Bay. He would not play again for Ireland until July 1977, against the same opponents, this time in Swansea. He was a little more successful on this second outing, scoring six runs in the Irish first innings. He then began to become more of a regular in the Irish side, playing against Surrey, the MCC and Wales in 1978, and against FW Millett's XI in 1979.

In 1980, he played against Wales, and made his first-class debut against Scotland in August. In 1981, he played against Canada, Middlesex, Gloucestershire, Scotland, the MCC, Wales and Surrey. The match that year against Scotland was his final first-class match, whilst the match against Gloucestershire was his List A debut. He scored 56 not out in the first innings of the match against Wales, his only half-century for Ireland.

His international career winded down in 1982, during which he played against India and the MCC, before playing his final game for Ireland against Northamptonshire in July, which was also his final List A match.

== Statistics ==
In all matches for Ireland, he scored 341 runs at an average of 20.06. He bowled just once, bowling three overs against Scotland in 1981.
