= Francis Fee =

Irish cricketer (born 1934)

Personal information
- Born: 14 May 1934 (age 92); Belfast, Northern Ireland
- Batting: Right-handed
- Bowling: Right-arm medium-pace/off spin

International information
- National side: Ireland

Career statistics
Competition	First-class
Matches	5
Runs scored	57
Batting average	8.14
100s/50s	0/0
Top score	15*
Balls bowled	1082
Wickets	37
Bowling average	9.62
5 wickets in innings	3
10 wickets in match	2
Best bowling	9/26
Catches/stumpings	4/0
- Source: Cricket Archive

Francis Fee (born 14 May 1934) is a former Irish cricketer.

A right-handed batsman and right-arm medium-pace and off-spin bowler, Fee made his debut for the Ireland cricket team against Sussex in August 1956, and went on to play for them on 13 occasions, his last match coming against Leicestershire in August 1959. Of his matches for Ireland, five had first-class status. In all matches, he scored 132 runs at an average of 8.25, with a top score of 31 against New Zealand in July 1958. He took 58 wickets at an average of 12.57, with best bowling figures of 9/26 against Scotland in July 1957.

Fee's figures of 9/26 against Scotland are the best innings bowling figures for Ireland where the number of runs conceded is known. It is one of only four occasions in which an Irish bowler has taken nine wickets in an innings, and one of only two occasions it has been done for Ireland in first-class cricket. His first-class bowling average of 9.62 is the best for Ireland in first-class cricket.

He worked as a schoolteacher and educational psychologist.
