= Richard Young (cricketer) =

Irish cricketer (1845–1885)

Personal information
- Full name: Richard James Caldwell Young
- Born: 2 February 1845; Derry, Ireland
- Died: 25 January 1885 (aged 39); Derry, Ireland
- Batting: Unknown

Domestic team information
- Years: Team
- 1873: Marylebone Cricket Club

Career statistics
Competition	First-class
Matches	1
Runs scored	11
Batting average	5.50
100s/50s	–/–
Top score	11
Catches/stumpings	–/–
- Source: Cricinfo, 5 October 2018

Richard James Caldwell Young (2 February 1845 – 25 January 1885) was an Irish first-class cricketer.

Young was born at Coolkeiragh House in Derry in February 1845. He played one first-class cricket match for the Marylebone Cricket Club (MCC) against the Surrey Club at Lord's in 1873. He batted in both the MCC's innings', scoring 11 runs in their first-innings, before being dismissed by James Southerton; in their second-innings he was dismissed without scoring by Fred Grace.
