= Patrick Maxwell (cricketer) =

Irish cricketer and medical doctor

Personal information
- Full name: Patrick Arthur Maxwell
- Born: 10 July 1869; Dublin, Ireland
- Died: 17 March 1902 (aged 32); Kalgoorlie, Western Australia, Australia
- Batting: Unknown

Domestic team information
- Years: Team
- 1895: Dublin University

Career statistics
Competition	First-class
Matches	4
Runs scored	105
Batting average	13.12
100s/50s	–/–
Top score	39
Catches/stumpings	1/–
- Source: Cricinfo, 3 November 2018

Patrick Arthur Maxwell (10 July 1869 – 17 March 1902) was an Irish first-class cricketer and medical doctor.

Maxwell was born at Dublin, one of four Maxwell brothers who were educated in England at Ushaw College. It is likely he studied at Trinity College, Dublin, given his later, albeit brief, career as a medical doctor. Playing his club cricket in Dublin for Dublin University, Maxwell made his debut in first-class cricket for the university against the Marylebone Cricket Club at College Park in May 1895. In June, he toured England with the university, playing a further two first-class matches against Cambridge University at Cambridge, and Leicestershire at Leicester. He made a final first-class appearance for the university in July, when Cambridge University visited Dublin for the return fixture between the sides. Across his four first-class matches, Maxwell scored 105 runs at an average of 13.12, with a highest score of 39. He emigrated to Australia not long after, where he practiced medicine at Kalgoorlie in Western Australia. He died there, on Saint Patrick's Day, in March 1902. He is buried at Kalgoorlie Cemetery.
