= Jack Short (cricketer) =

Irish cricketer

Personal information
- Full name: John Francis Short
- Born: 12 April 1951 (age 75); Cork, Munster, Ireland
- Batting: Right-handed
- Bowling: Right-arm off break

Domestic team information
- Years: Team
- 1974–1984: Ireland

Career statistics
Competition	First-class	List A
Matches	11	5
Runs scored	533	94
Batting average	33.31	18.80
100s/50s	1/2	–/–
Top score	114	37
Balls bowled	0	5
Wickets	–	0
Bowling average	–	–
5 wickets in innings	–	–
10 wickets in match	–	–
Best bowling	–	–
Catches/stumpings	10/–	–/–
- Source: Cricinfo, 23 October 2018

John 'Jack' Francis Short (born 12 April 1951) is a former Irish first-class cricketer and civil servant.

Short was born at Cork in April 1951, where he was educated at Presentation Brothers College. After completing his secondary education, he studied mathematics and statistics at University College Cork. He graduated in 1974 and took up a post in the Irish civil service.

Playing his club cricket for Cork County, Short made his debut in first-class cricket for Ireland against Scotland at Alloway in 1974. He played in Ireland's first ever List A match in 1980, when Ireland played Middlesex in the Gillette Cup. He played first-class and List A cricket for Ireland until 1980, making eleven appearances in first-class cricket and five in List A cricket. In first-class cricket as an opening batsman, he scored 533 runs at a batting average of 33.31, with a high score of 114. This score, which was his only first-class century, came against Scotland in 1975. In List A cricket, he scored 97 runs with a high score of 37.

His playing career for Ireland came to an end in 1984, when he accepted a position with the OECD in Paris. He played club cricket in Paris for Standard Athletic Club, as well as representing France in minor matches against the Marylebone Cricket Club and Belgium.
