= Peter Clarke (cricketer) =

Irish cricketer (1881–1915)

Personal information
- Born: 19 May 1881; London, England
- Died: 14 December 1915 (aged 34); Dublin, Ireland
- Batting: Right-handed
- Bowling: Leg-break

International information
- National side: Ireland

Career statistics
| Competition | First-class |
|---|---|
| Matches | 19 |
| Runs scored | 125 |
| Batting average | 7.81 |
| 100s/50s | 0/0 |
| Top score | 28 |
| Balls bowled | 2,102 |
| Wickets | 47 |
| Bowling average | 29.27 |
| 5 wickets in innings | 2 |
| 10 wickets in match | 0 |
| Best bowling | 5/62 |
| Catches/stumpings | 7/– |
- Source: CricketArchive, 6 December 2022

Peter Clarke (19 May 1881 – 14 December 1915) was an Irish cricketer. A right-handed batsman and leg-break bowler, he had a brief, but interesting, career.

In May 1912 he was plucked from virtual obscurity to make his first-class debut in a Test trial match for the England cricket team. He was not selected for the England team, but did play for Ireland against South Africa later that same year. This match was his only match for Ireland.

Following this, he played several first-class matches for the MCC and Middlesex throughout 1913 and 1914, before he died in Dublin in December 1915.
