= Wilson Scott =

Irish cricketer

Personal information
- Full name: Hugh Wilson Scott
- Born: 18 December 1927; Belfast, Northern Ireland
- Died: 17 April 2018 (aged 90); Belfast, Northern Ireland
- Batting: Right-handed
- Bowling: Right-arm medium

Domestic team information
- Years: Team
- 1958: Ireland

Career statistics
| Competition | First-class |
|---|---|
| Matches | 1 |
| Runs scored | – |
| Batting average | – |
| 100s/50s | –/– |
| Top score | – |
| Balls bowled | 30 |
| Wickets | 0 |
| Bowling average | – |
| 5 wickets in innings | – |
| 10 wickets in match | – |
| Best bowling | – |
| Catches/stumpings | –/– |
- Source: Cricinfo, 25 October 2018

Hugh Wilson Scott (18 December 1927 – 17 April 2018) was an Irish first-class cricketer.

Scott was born at Belfast and educated in the city at Belfast Technical High School. Playing club cricket for Cliftonville in Belfast, Scott made a single appearance in first-class cricket for Ireland against Scotland in 1958 at Alloway. Wilson wasn't required to bat in the match and bowled five wicket-less overs of medium pace. He also played three minor matches for Ireland in 1958; playing once against Worcestershire and twice against the touring New Zealanders. Following Cliftonville's league relegation at the end of the 1950s, Scott joined Woodvale. Outside of cricket he worked as an accounts manager. He died at Belfast in April 2018.
