= John Melville (cricketer) =

Scottish cricketer

Personal information
- Full name: John Hutchison Melville
- Born: 19 June 1895; Cowdenbeath, Fife, Scotland
- Died: 22 September 1951 (aged 56); Aylesbury, Buckinghamshire, England
- Batting: Right-handed
- Bowling: Slow left-arm orthodox

International information
- National side: Scotland

Domestic team information
- Years: Team
- 1937: Buckinghamshire
- 1937: Scotland

Career statistics
Competition	First-class
Matches	6
Runs scored	21
Batting average	2.62
100s/50s	0/0
Top score	9*
Balls bowled	1,107
Wickets	33
Bowling average	16.93
5 wickets in innings	3
10 wickets in match	0
Best bowling	6/32
Catches/stumpings	4/–
- Source: Cricinfo, 25 May 2011

John Hutchison Melville (19 June 1895 – 22 September 1951) was a Scottish cricketer. Melville was a right-handed batsman who bowled slow left-arm orthodox. He was born at Cowdenbeath.

Melville made his first-class debut for Scotland against Ireland in 1932. He played five further first-class matches for Scotland, the last coming against Yorkshire in 1937. A bowler, Melville took 33 wickets at a bowling average of 33, with best figures of 6/32, one of three five wicket hauls he took. His best bowling figures came against the touring Indians in 1932.

Melville played three Minor Counties Championship fixtures for Buckinghamshire in 1937, against Lincolnshire, Hertfordshire and Bedfordshire.

He died in Aylesbury, Buckinghamshire on 22 September 1951.
