= Mark Nulty =

Irish cricketer (born 1967)

Mark Alexander Fabian Nulty (born 9 October 1967 in Dublin) is a former Irish First-class cricket player who competed in the late 1980s. He played for 1 year on the Ireland cricket team.
