= Patrick Murphy (cricketer) =

Irish cricketer

Personal information
- Full name: Patrick Murphy
- Born: Q1 1882; County Wicklow, Ireland
- Died: Q2 1938 (aged 56); Dublin, Leinster, Ireland
- Nickname: Paddy
- Batting: Right-handed
- Bowling: Left-arm fast-medium

Domestic team information
- Years: Team
- 1909–1912: Ireland

Career statistics
Competition	First-class
Matches	2
Runs scored	26
Batting average	13.00
100s/50s	–/–
Top score	10
Balls bowled	192
Wickets	4
Bowling average	29.25
5 wickets in innings	–
10 wickets in match	–
Best bowling	2/92
Catches/stumpings	1/–
- Source: Cricinfo, 26 October 2018

Patrick Murphy (Q1 1882 – Q2 1938) was an Irish first-class cricketer.

Murphy was born at County Wicklow in the 1st quarter of 1882. Playing club cricket for Civil Service (Dublin), Murphy made two appearances in first-class cricket for Ireland. The first of these came against Scotland at Perth in 1909, while the second of these came against the same opposition at Dublin in 1912. Across his two matches, he scored 26 runs with a high score of 10. With his medium pace he took 4 wickets, with best innings figures of 2/92. His work as a civil servant limited any future appearances. He died at Dublin in the 2nd quarter of 1938.
