= Ligoniel =

Suburb of Belfast, Northern Ireland

Coordinates: 54°37′39″N 5°59′10″W

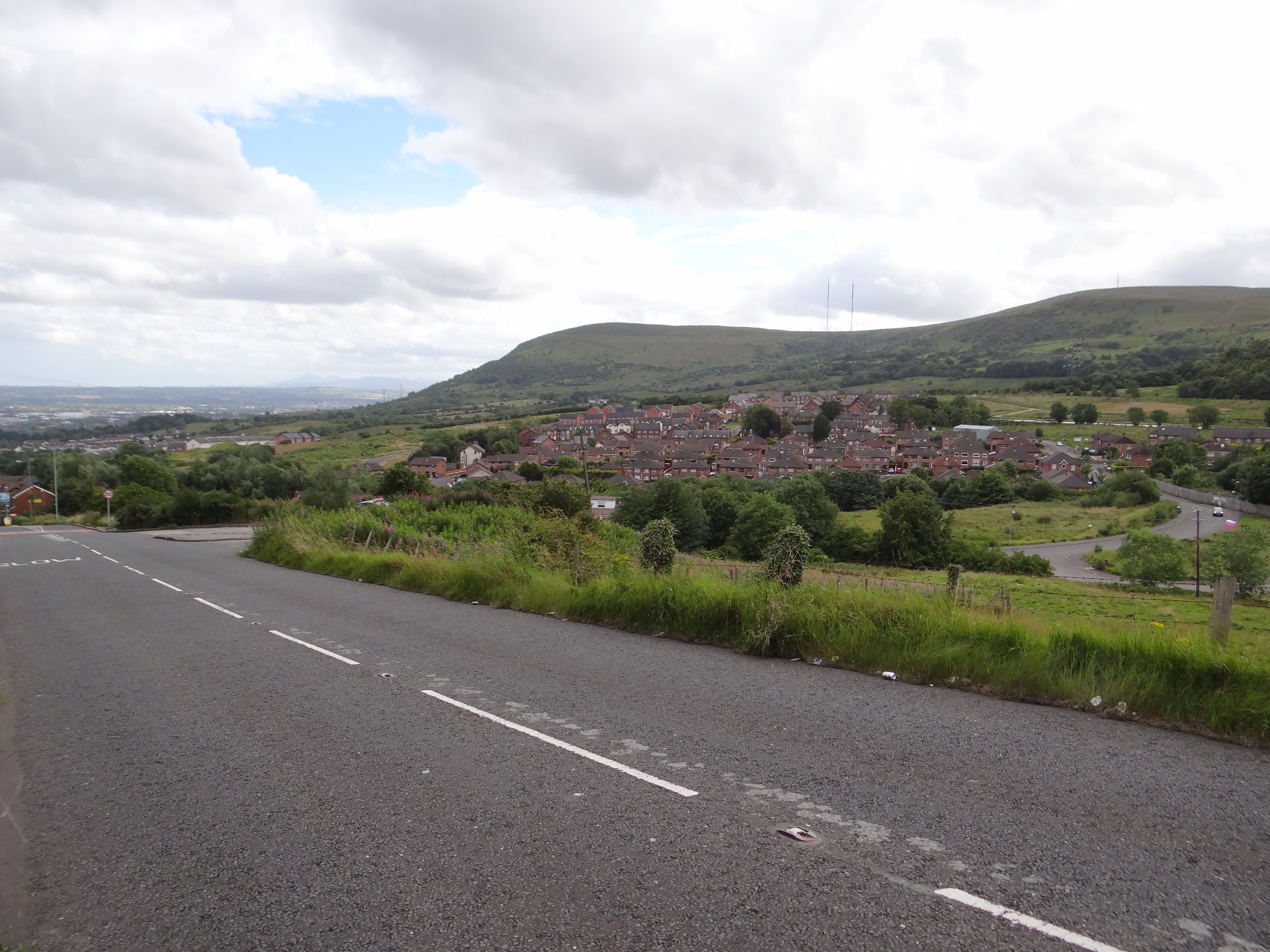
View over Ligoniel, with Black Mountain and Divis in the background

Ligoniel, also Legoniel (from Irish Lag an Aoil, meaning "hollow of the lime"), is a north-western suburb of Belfast, on the upper Crumlin Road. As its name suggests, it was originally a village located in a limestone hollow on Wolf Hill, allegedly the place where Ireland's last wolf was killed.
