= Goodwin Young =

Irish cricketer

Personal information
- Full name: Goodwin Young
- Born: c. 1850; Carrigrohane, Ireland
- Died: 9 January 1915; Cork, Ireland
- Batting: Unknown
- Bowling: Slow left-arm orthodox

Domestic team information
- Years: Team
- 1873: Cambridge University

Career statistics
Competition	First-class
Matches	3
Runs scored	17
Batting average	5.66
100s/50s	–/–
Top score	12*
Balls bowled	649
Wickets	16
Bowling average	15.87
5 wickets in innings	2
10 wickets in match	1
Best bowling	5/24
Catches/stumpings	2/–
- Source: Cricinfo, 7 November 2018

Goodwin Young (c. 1850 – 9 January 1915) was an Irish first-class cricketer who played for Cambridge University. He appeared in three first-class matches in 1873.

Young was born at Carrigshane, near Midleton, County Cork, Ireland. He was educated at Shrewsbury School and St John's College, Cambridge. While studying at Cambridge he was admitted to the Inner Temple and after graduating he was called to the bar. He returned to Ireland and was admitted to King's Inns. He died in County Cork.
