= Edward Rooney =

Irish cricketer

Personal information
- Full name: Edward A Rooney
- Born: Circa 1880; County Meath, Ireland
- Died: Circa 1950; Ireland
- Batting: Right-handed
- Bowling: Right-arm fast-medium

Domestic team information
- Years: Team
- 1913–1914: Ireland

Career statistics
| Competition | First-class |
|---|---|
| Matches | 2 |
| Runs scored | 34 |
| Batting average | 17.00 |
| 100s/50s | –/– |
| Top score | 12* |
| Balls bowled | 0 |
| Wickets | – |
| Bowling average | – |
| 5 wickets in innings | – |
| 10 wickets in match | – |
| Best bowling | – |
| Catches/stumpings | 1/– |
- Source: Cricinfo, 7 November 2018

Edward A Rooney (Circa 1880 – Circa 1950) was an Irish first-class cricketer.

Rooney was born at County Meath sometime prior to 1880. A civil servant with the Irish Land Commission, Rooney played his club cricket for the Land Commission associated Merrion, as well as playing for Pembroke. He made two appearances in first-class cricket for Ireland against Scotland at Edinburgh in 1913. He made a second first-class appearance against Scotland the following year at Dublin. He scored 34 runs across his two matches, with a highest score of 12 not out. He did not feature for Ireland again. He later rose to the position of Acting Assistant Director in the Land Commission.
