= Joseph Dixon (English cricketer) =

English cricketer

Personal information
- Full name: Joseph Gilbert Dixon
- Born: 3 September 1895; Chelmsford, Essex, England
- Died: 19 November 1954 (aged 59); Great Baddow, Essex, England
- Batting: Right-handed
- Role: Bowler

Domestic team information
- Years: Team
- 1914–1922: Essex

Career statistics
Competition	FC
Matches	93
Runs scored	2214
Batting average
100s/50s
Top score
Balls bowled
Wickets	206
Bowling average
5 wickets in innings
10 wickets in match
Best bowling
Catches/stumpings
- Source: Cricinfo, 21 July 2013

Joseph Dixon (3 September 1895 – 19 November 1954) was an English cricketer. He played for Essex between 1914 and 1922.
