= Victor Craig =

Irish cricketer (1917–2005)

Personal information
- Full name: Victor Alexander Craig
- Born: 27 July 1917; Strabane, Ireland
- Died: 28 June 2005 (aged 87); Strabane, Northern Ireland
- Batting: Left-handed
- Role: Wicket-keeper

Domestic team information
- Years: Team
- 1948: Ireland

Career statistics
| Competition | First-class |
|---|---|
| Matches | 1 |
| Runs scored | 12 |
| Batting average | 12.00 |
| 100s/50s | –/– |
| Top score | 12 |
| Catches/stumpings | 2/– |
- Source: Cricinfo, 4 January 2022

Victor Alexander Craig (27 July 1917 in Strabane, County Tyrone – 28 June 2005 in Strabane) was an Irish cricketer. A left-handed batsman and wicket-keeper, he played just once for the Ireland cricket team, a first-class match against the MCC in Dublin in August 1948.
