= Robert Wills (cricketer) =

Irish cricketer

Personal information
- Full name: Robert Thomas Wills
- Born: 19 July 1950 (age 76); Belfast, Northern Ireland
- Batting: Right-handed
- Bowling: Right-arm medium

Domestic team information
- Years: Team
- 1981–1985: Ireland

Career statistics
Competition	First-class	List A
Matches	5	4
Runs scored	121	24
Batting average	17.28	6.00
100s/50s	–/–	–/–
Top score	48	13
Balls bowled	0	0
Wickets	–	–
Bowling average	–	–
5 wickets in innings	–	–
10 wickets in match	–	–
Best bowling	–	–
Catches/stumpings	–/–	–/–
- Source: Cricinfo, 26 October 2018

Robert Thomas Wills (born 19 July 1950) is a former Irish first-class cricketer.

Wills was born at Belfast and educated in the city at Everton Secondary School. Playing his club cricket for Woodvale in Belfast, Wills made his debut in first-class cricket for Ireland against Scotland at Dublin in 1981. The following season he made his debut in List A one-day cricket against Northamptonshire at Northampton in the NatWest Trophy. He played first-class and List A cricket for Ireland until 1985, making five appearances in first-class cricket and four in List A cricket. In first-class cricket, he scored 121 runs at a batting average of 17.28, with a highest score of 48. In List A cricket, he scored 24 runs with a high score of 13. Outside of cricket, Wills worked as an engineer.
