= Jim Ganly =

Irish cricketer and rugby union footballer

Cricket information
- Batting: Right-handed
- Bowling: Right-arm fast-medium

International information
- National side: Ireland

Career statistics
Competition	First-class
Matches	15
Runs scored	486
Batting average	17.35
100s/50s	0/3
Top score	62*
Balls bowled	330
Wickets	7
Bowling average	25.28
5 wickets in innings	0
10 wickets in match	0
Best bowling	2/22
Catches/stumpings	5/–
- Source: CricketArchive, 15 November 2022

James Blandford Ganly (7 March 1904 – 22 July 1976) was an Irish cricketer and rugby union player.

== Personal life ==
Educated at St Columba's College and Trinity College Dublin, Ganly was an auctioneer by profession.

== Cricket ==
A right-handed batsman and right-arm fast-medium bowler, Ganly played 25 times for the Ireland cricket team between 1921 and 1937, including 14 first-class matches.

=== Playing career ===
Ganly made his debut for Ireland shortly after leaving school at the age of 17 in August 1921 against Scotland in a first-class match. He was bowled for a duck in the only Irish innings. He returned to the Ireland side in June 1923, again playing against Scotland in a first-class match, also playing against Wales. In 1924, he played for Ireland a fourth time, again against Wales and also played his only first-class match for Dublin University in June against Northamptonshire.

He became a more regular fixture in the Irish team from 1925. That year he played against Scotland, the MCC at Lord's Cricket Ground and Wales. He scored 62 not out in the second innings of the match against Scotland, his highest first-class score. The following year, he played against the same three teams, and the match against the MCC in Dublin was his most successful for Ireland, scoring 83 in the first innings and 68 in the second, his top two scores in all matches for Ireland.

He continued as a regular in the Irish team between 1927 and 1930, playing against Scotland, the MCC, and the West Indies, amongst other opponents. He captained Ireland against the West Indies in 1928, a match which Ireland won. It remains their only victory against a Test nation in a first-class match, though they have beaten the West Indies twice since in one-day matches. A match against Julien Cahn's XI in 1930 would be his last for four years.

He returned to the Ireland side in August 1934, playing against the MCC in a first-class match before spending a further three years out of the Ireland side. His last two matches for Ireland were two against New Zealand in September 1937, the first of which was his final first-class match.

=== Statistics ===
In all matches for Ireland, Ganly scored 831 runs at an average of 19.79, with a top score of 83 against the MCC in August 1926. He took nine wickets at an average of 26.56, with best bowling figures of 2/22 against Scotland in July 1927. He captained Ireland eight times.

=== Post-playing career ===
Ganly served as president of the Irish Cricket Union in 1965. He died in a shooting accident on 22 July 1976.

== Rugby Union ==
Ganly first played for the Ireland national rugby union team in the Five Nations in 1927. He played in all four games, scoring two tries against Wales and one against Scotland. Later that year, he played in a friendly match against Australia, scoring a penalty.

In the 1928 Five Nations, Ganly again played in all four games and scored two tries against France, one against Scotland and one against Wales. He played against France and Scotland in the 1929 championship, and against France in 1930, but did not score in any of those games.

He finished his Rugby Union career with a record of seven tries and one penalty from a total of twelve games.

== See also ==
- List of Irish cricket and rugby union players
