= Arthur Douglas (sportsman) =

Irish cricketer and rugby union footballer

Cricket information
- Batting: Right-handed
- Bowling: Right-arm fast-medium

International information
- National side: Ireland

Career statistics
Competition	First-class
Matches	7
Runs scored	262
Batting average	18.71
100s/50s	0/2
Top score	63
Balls bowled	862
Wickets	12
Bowling average	28.41
5 wickets in innings	0
10 wickets in match	0
Best bowling	4/35
Catches/stumpings	4/–
- Source: CricketArchive, 15 November 2022

Arthur Douglas (16 August 1902 – 27 June 1937) was an Irish cricketer and Rugby Union player.

== Cricket ==
A right-handed batsman and right-arm fast-medium bowler, he made his debut for the Ireland cricket team in July 1925 against Scotland in a first-class match. He went on to play for Ireland on 13 occasions, his last match coming against the MCC at Lord's in August 1933.

Of his matches for Ireland, seven had first-class status. Six of these were against Scotland, the other was against Wales. In all matches for Ireland, he scored 343 runs at an average of 14.91, with a top score of 63 against Scotland in July 1928. He took 17 wickets at an average of 30.94, with best bowling figures of 4/35 against Scotland in June 1932.

Prior to his debut for the full Irish side, he represented a North of Ireland side against Wales in June 1924.

== Rugby ==
A winger, he made his debut for the Ireland rugby union team against France in the 1923 Five Nations, scoring one try. He played against England and Scotland the following year, scoring a try against England. He returned to the side for the 1928 Five Nations, playing just one match against Scotland, without scoring.

== See also ==
- List of Irish cricket and rugby union players
