= Gilbert Hole =

Scottish cricketer and badminton player

Personal information
- Full name: Gilbert Lindsay Douglas Hole
- Born: 28 June 1882; Edinburgh, Midlothian, Scotland
- Died: 10 November 1967 (aged 85); Edinburgh, Midlothian, Scotland
- Batting: Right-handed
- Bowling: Right-arm medium

Domestic team information
- Years: Team
- 1910–1926: Scotland

Career statistics
Competition	First-class
Matches	10
Runs scored	260
Batting average	17.33
100s/50s	–/–
Top score	37
Balls bowled	1,013
Wickets	27
Bowling average	16.66
5 wickets in innings	2
10 wickets in match	–
Best bowling	5/20
Catches/stumpings	2/–
- Source: Cricinfo, 2 August 2022

Gilbert Lindsay Douglas Hole (28 June 1882 — 10 November 1967) was a Scottish first-class cricketer, cricket administrator, and British Army officer.

The son of the artist William Hole, he was born at Edinburgh in June 1882. He was educated at the Edinburgh Academy, before matriculating to study law at the University of Edinburgh. He initially played his club cricket for Edinburgh Academical Cricket Club, Hole made his debut for Scotland in first-class cricket against Ireland at Dublin, with him making a further appearance before the First World War against the same opposition at Dublin in 1912.

In 1906, he married Grace Chalmers, the eldest daughter of a Liverpool merchant. This connection to the city saw him serve in the war with the Liverpool Scottish, which formed part of the King's Regiment (Liverpool). He initially served as a private from 1916, before being commissioned as a second lieutenant in February 1917. He saw action on the Western Front at the Third Battle of Ypres and the Battle of Cambrai, in addition to engagements at Festubert and La Bassée. He was later promoted to lieutenant in July 1918.

Following the war, Hole resumed playing first-class cricket for Scotland, making an additional eight appearances until 1926, six of which came in the annual match against Ireland. Playing as an all-rounder in the Scottish side, he scored 260 runs in his ten first-class matches at an average of 17.33, with a highest score of 37. As a right-arm medium pace bowler, he took 27 wickets at a bowling average of 16.66; he took two five wicket hauls, with best figures of 5 for 20 against Ireland in 1912. In his professional capacity as a solicitor, Hole was a member of the Society of Writers to Her Majesty's Signet. Hole later served as the president of the Scottish Cricket Union in 1937. He died at Edinburgh in November 1967.
