= Cork County Cricket Club =

Cricket club in Cork, Ireland

Cork County

Team information
- Founded: 1874
- Home ground: The Mardyke

Cork County Cricket

Cork County Cricket Club is a cricket club in Cork, Ireland, playing in Division 2 of the Leinster Senior League. A member of the Munster Cricket Union, it is the only club from outside Leinster playing in the Leinster League.

The club was established in 1874. In 2009, it was given permission by the Leinster Cricket Union to compete in the Leinster League from the 2010 season. Promotion to Division 1 was first achieved in 2014.

== Current Squad ==
- Players with international caps are listed in **bold**.
- *denotes players qualified to play for Ireland on residency or dual nationality.

Name	Nationality	Birth date	Batting Style	Bowling Style	Notes
Batsmen
Abdul Ghaffar	Ireland		Right-handed	—	
Syed Aiman	Ireland		Right-handed	Right arm off break	
Sunil Gautam	India*		Right-handed	—	
Brian Upman	Ireland		Right-handed	—	
All-rounders
Mark Andrianatos	South Africa	31 January 1996 (age 29)	Right-handed	Right arm medium	Overseas Pro
Eshan O'Sullivan	Ireland		Right-handed	Right arm medium	
Nabell Anjum	Ireland	1 January 2000 (age 25)	Right-handed	Right-arm leg break	
Wicket-keepers
Ross Durity	Ireland		Right-handed	—	Captain
Benjamin Marris	Ireland		Right-handed	—	Vice Captain
Bowlers
Thorne Phrophet	South Africa*		Right-handed	Right arm off break	
Zubair Hassan Khan	Saudi Arabia*	24 July 2002 (age 22)	Right-handed	Right arm medium-fast	
Diarmuid Carey	Ireland	28 September 2000 (age 24)	Left-handed	Slow left-arm orthodox	
Sam Fenn	Ireland		Right-handed	Right arm medium	
Sauliman Safi	Afghanistan			Right arm medium	
