= Glenpark Cricket Ground =

Cricket ground in Greenock, Scotlan

Coordinates: 55°57′21.09″N 04°46′35.88″W

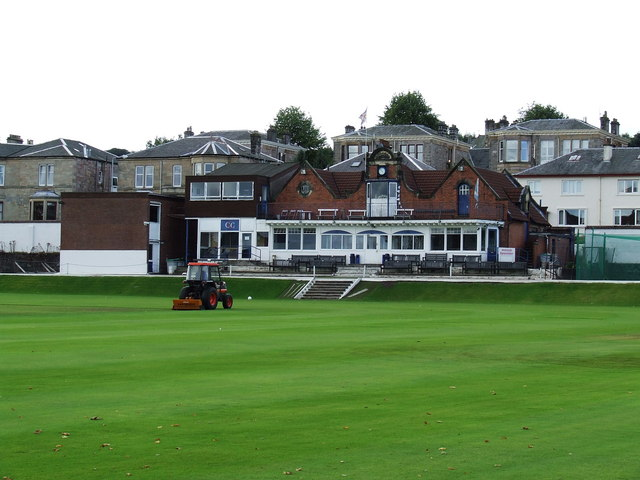
- Interactive map of Glenpark Cricket Ground

Ground information
- Location: Greenock, Scotland
- Country: Scotland
- Establishment: 1869 (first recorded match)

Team information
Greenock Cricket Club	(1869–Present)
Scotland	(1926–1972)
- As of 19 October 2011; Source: Ground profile

Glenpark Cricket Ground is a cricket ground in Greenock, Scotland. The first recorded match held on the ground came in 1869 when Greenock played the Players of Scotland. Scotland played their first first-class match there in 1926 against Ireland. The ground held five further first-class matches, the last of which saw Scotland play Ireland in 1972. Five of the first-class matches played there were between Scotland and Ireland, while another was between Scotland and the Marylebone Cricket Club.

The ground is still in use today by Greenock Cricket Club.
