= Dublin University Cricket Club =

Cricket Club of Trinity College Dublin

Dublin University

Dublin University Cricket Club is a cricket team in Ireland. There is evidence of cricket being played at the university before 1820 but the first record of a club dates from 1835. They currently play in the Leinster Senior League, and in the past had first-class status, and played against several sides that were touring England, including the Australians (twice), South Africans (three times) and West Indians (as late as 1923).

== History ==
Their first first-class matches came in 1895 when they played home and away matches against Cambridge University, also playing at home against the MCC and away against Leicestershire. They would not play first-class cricket again until 1922 when they played Essex and four times against Northamptonshire between 1924 and 1926. The two games in 1926 are their final first-class games to date. The team for two of those games against Northamptonshire featured the Irish writer Samuel Beckett.

The club has produced more than 150 players for Ireland, the most prominent probably being Ed Joyce, who played fifty times for Ireland before going on to represent England. Four former DUCC men played Test cricket -- Leland Hone (England), Clement Johnson (South Africa), Ed Joyce and George Dockrell (Ireland).

== Honours ==
- Leinster Senior League: 5
  - 1927, 1947, 1948, 1966, 1970
- Leinster Senior Cup: 5
  - 1942, 1952, 1961, 1962, 1963
