= College Park, Dublin =

Cricket ground in Dublin, Ireland

Coordinates: 53°20′34.62″N 6°15′15.42″W

College Park
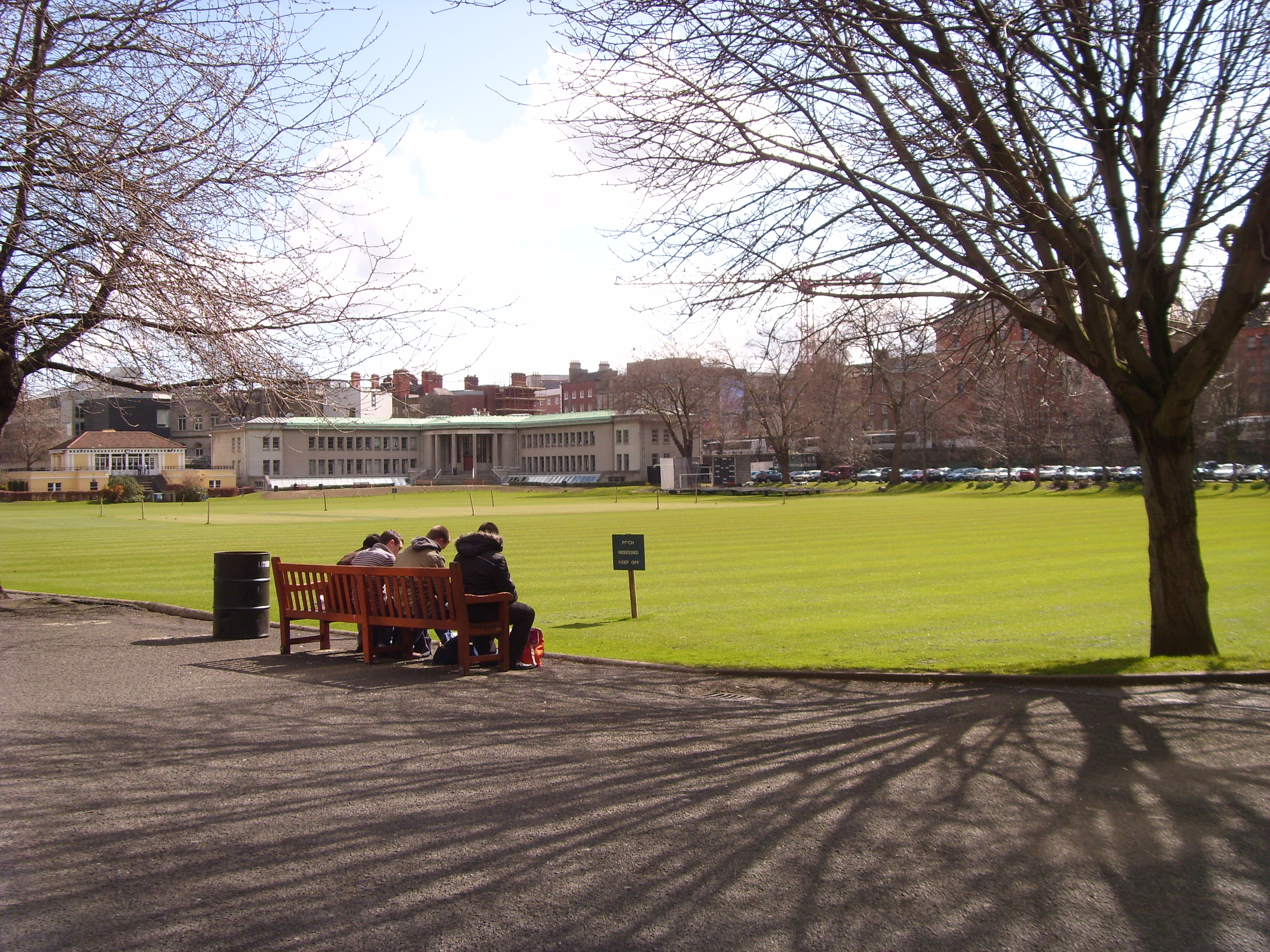
- Interactive map of College Park

Ground information
- Location: Dublin, Ireland
- Country: Ireland
- Establishment: 1868 (first recorded match)

International information
- Only women's Test: 30 July-3 August 2000: Ireland v Pakistan
- First women's ODI: 1 July 1987: Ireland v Australia
- Last women's ODI: 1 August 2005: Ireland v Australia

Team information
Dublin University Cricket Club	(1835–present)
- As of 3 September 2020; Source: Ground profile

College Park is a cricket ground in the grounds of Trinity College Dublin in Ireland and is the home ground of Dublin University Cricket Club. A cricket match at Trinity College was mentioned in a poem 1820s between a team from Ballinasloe playing "the Collegians", although whether this match was played on the present ground is not known. The first recorded mention of cricket on the present ground dates from 1868, when Ireland played an All England Eleven in a non first-class fixture.

The ground is where Dublin University Cricket Club play their home matches, during the time when Ireland was part of the United Kingdom; the club held a great influence over Irish cricket, and the ground was considered the centre of cricket in Ireland. The cricket club once had first-class status, it was in 1895 that the ground held its first first-class match between Dublin University and the Marylebone Cricket Club. Ireland first used the ground for a first-class fixture in 1907 against the touring South Africans. With the Partition of Ireland in 1922, cricket lost much of its standing in the newly created state, Dublin University suffered too with the subsequent decline of the sport in the Republic. Nevertheless, the ground continued to host touring sides and English county sides, with 1926 seeing Dublin University play its third and final first-class fixture against Northamptonshire.

The ground continued to host first-class fixtures until 1961, the year in which the 28th and final first-class fixture to date to be held there between Ireland and the Marylebone Cricket Club was played. A fire occurred at the ground in 1963, destroying a scorebox which had been built in honour of Herbert Rollins. Decades later the ground made history in 2000 by playing host to Ireland women's first Women's Test match against Pakistan women, which Ireland women won by an innings and 54 runs. Despite as of 2011 still holding Test status, this remains Ireland women's only Test appearance. College Park has also held Women's One Day International cricket, the first match of that type being played there in 1987 between Ireland Women and Australia women. To date the ground has played host to ten Women's One Day Internationals, the last of which was between Ireland women and Australia women in 2005.

From 2019, College Park was to become the home ground for Leinster Lightning for the 2019 and 2020 seasons, though this arrangement failed to materialise.

== See also ==
- List of Leinster Lightning grounds
