= List of cricket clubs in Ireland =

The following list composes the cricket clubs that make up domestic cricket in Ireland. The clubs are split into different cricket unions according to their geographic location within Ireland: Leinster Cricket Union; Northern Cricket Union; Munster Cricket Union, North West Cricket Union and the newly formed Connacht Cricket Union, which was formed in November 2010.

== Connacht Cricket Union ==
- Athlone Town Cricket Club
- Ballina Cricket Club
- Ballyhaunis Cricket Club
- Ballyhaunis Lions Cricket Club
- Ballaghaderreen Cricket Club
- County Galway Cricket Club
- County Sligo Cricket Club
- Galway Shamrocks Cricket Club
- Kilconnell Cricket Club
- Merlin Cricket Club
- Riverstown Cricket Club
- Slieve Bloom Cricket Club
- University of Galway Cricket Club

== Munster Cricket Union ==
- Cork County Cricket Club
- Cork Harlequins
- County Galway Cricket Club
- County Kerry Cricket Club
- Limerick Cricket Club
- Lismore Cricket Club
- Midleton Cricket Club
- North Kerry Cricket Club
- Tipperary County Cricket Club
- University College Cork Cricket Club
- Waterford District Cricket Club

== North West Cricket Union ==
Senior 1

- Bonds Glen
- Bready
- Brigade
- Coleraine
- Creevedonnell
- Donemana
- Fox Lodge
- Glendermott
- Limavady
- Strabane
- North Fermanagh

Senior 2

- Ardmore
- Burndennett
- Drummond
- Eglinton
- Killyclooney
- The Nedd
- St Johnston
- Sion Mills

== Northern Cricket Union ==
Premier League

- Ballymena
- Carrickfergus
- C.I.Y.M.S.
- Civil Service North
- Instonians
- Lisburn
- North Down
- Waringstown
- Euro T20 Slam

Section 1

- Bangor
- Cliftonville
- Derriaghy
- Donaghcloney
- Downpatrick
- Dundrum
- Holywood
- Lurgan
- Muckamore
- Woodvale

Section 2

- Academy
- Armagh
- B.I.S.C.
- Cooke Collegians
- Drumaness
- Laurelvale
- Millpark
- Portadown
- Saintfield
- Templepatrick

Section 3

- Ards
- Clogher
- Cregagh
- Donaghadee
- Dungannon
- Dunmurry
- Larne
- P.S.N.I.
- Victoria

== Leinster Cricket Union ==
=== Division 1 ===
- Clontarf
- Cork County
- Malahide
- Merrion
- North County
- Pembroke
- Railway Union

=== Division 2 ===
- Balbriggan
- Dublin University
- Leinster
- Phoenix
- Rush
- Terenure (formerly CYM Cricket Club)
- The Hills

=== Other clubs ===
- Adamstown Cricket Club
- Ashbourne Cricket Club
- Athlone Cricket Club
- Avondale Cricket Club
- Bagenalstown Cricket Club
- Ballaghaderreen Cricket Club
- Ballyeighan Cricket Club
- Cabinteely Cricket Club
- Castleknock Cricket Club
- Carlow Cricket Club
- Civil Service Cricket Club
- Dublin Institute of Technology Cricket Club
- Dundrum Cricket Club
- Dundalk Cricket Club
- Dundalk Institute of Technology Cricket Club
- Evening Herald Taverners
- Garda Cricket Club
- Gorey Cricket Club
- Greystones Cricket Club
- Halverstown Cricket Club
- Knockbrack Cricket Club
- Knockharley Cricket Club
- Laois Cricket Club
- Leprechauns Cricket Club
- Letterkenny Cricket Club
- Longford Cricket Club
- Lucan Cricket Club
- Mullingar Cricket Club
- Munster Reds Cricket Club
- North Kildare Cricket Club
- Old Belvedere Cricket Club
- Ringcommons Cricket Club
- Royal College Of Surgeons Cricket Club
- Sandyford Cricket Club
- Slieve Bloom Cricket Club
- Swords Cricket Club
- Tyrellstown Cricket Club
- University College Dublin Cricket Club
- Wexford Wanderers Cricket Club
- Wicklow County Cricket Club
