= List of Northern Ireland cricket clubs =

Northern Ireland cricket clubs, by county, are as follows:

== County Antrim ==
- Academy Cricket Club, Hydepark
- Ballymena Cricket Club
- Belfast International Sports Club, Mallusk
- Carrickfergus Cricket Club, Carrickfergus
- Cliftonville Cricket Club, Mallusk
- Cooke Collegians Cricket Club, Belfast
- Cregagh Cricket Club, Belfast
- Derriaghy Cricket Club, Derriaghy
- Dunmurry Cricket Club
- Larne Cricket Club, Larne
- Lisburn Cricket Club, Lisburn
- Muckamore Cricket Club, Antrim
- P.S.N.I. Cricket Club, Belfast
- Templepatrick Cricket Club, Ballyclare
- Woodvale Cricket Club,Belfast
- Ardent Blues Cricket Club, Belfast

== County Armagh ==
- Armagh Cricket Club, Armagh
- Laurelvale Cricket Club
- Lurgan Cricket Club, Lurgan
- Portadown Cricket Club
- Victoria Cricket Club Lurgan

== County Down ==
- Ards Cricket Club, Newtownards
- Bangor Cricket Club, Bangor
- C.I.Y.M.S. Cricket Club, Belfast
- Civil Service North of Ireland Cricket Club, Belfast
- Cooke Collegians Cricket Club, Belfast
- Donaghadee Cricket Club, Donaghadee
- Donaghcloney Cricket Club
- Downpatrick Cricket Club, Downpatrick
- Drumaness Cricket Club, Drumaness
- Dundrum Cricket Club, Dundrum
- Holywood Cricket Club, Holywood
- Instonians, Belfast
- Millpark Cricket Club, Gilford
- North Down Cricket Club, Comber
- Saintfield Cricket Club, Saintfield
- Waringstown Cricket Club, Waringstown

== County Fermanagh ==
- North Fermanagh Cricket Club
- Erne Community Cricket Club

== County Londonderry ==
- Ardmore Cricket Club, Ardmore
- Bonds Glen Cricket Club, Derry
- Brigade Cricket Club, Derry
- Coleraine Cricket Club, Coleraine
- Creevedonnell Cricket Club, Derry
- Drummond Cricket Club, Limavady
- Eglinton Cricket Club, Eglinton
- Glendermott Cricket Club, Derry
- Limavady Cricket Club, Limavady
- Maghera Cricket Club, Maghera
- The Nedd Cricket Club, Ballykelly

== County Tyrone ==
- Bready Cricket Club, Bready
- Burndennet Cricket Club
- Clogher Cricket Club
- Donemana Cricket Club, Donemana
- Dungannon Cricket Club
- Fox Lodge Cricket Club, Ballymagorry
- Killyclooney Cricket Club
- Sion Mills Cricket Club, Sion Mills
- Strabane Cricket Club, Strabane
