= NCU Challenge Cup =

Provincial cricket competition on the island of Ireland

The NCU Challenge Cup, also called the NCU Senior Challenge Cup and the NCU Senior Cup, is the most important provincial cricket knock-out cup of the NCU jurisdiction in Ireland. The competition began in 1887, with eleven clubs participating in the first competition, North Down eventually beating North of Ireland in the final at Ormeau.

The Cup is open to teams playing in the Premier League and Section 1 of the NCU Senior League. It is sponsored by Arthur J Gallagher and marketed as the Arthur J Gallagher Challenge Cup.

Matches consist of one 50-over innings per side. Where matches are interrupted or delayed because of weather, the number of overs may be reduced to a minimum of 20. Duckworth Lewis is employed where a match is interrupted after it has started.

The most successful club in the competition is North Down with 32 victories (1 shared).

CSNI are the current holders after beating Instonians in the 2026 Final.

== List of finals ==
Source for finals up to 2002: J. Clarence Hiles (2003), A History of Senior Cricket in Ulster. Comber: Hilltop Publications Ltd.

=== 1880s ===
Season	Winners	Runners-up	Venue	Match Scores
1887	North Down	North of Ireland	Ormeau	North 47 (Turner 5/23) and 107; North Down 159 (Patton 34, Andrews 30); North Down won by an innings and 5 runs.
1888	North Down	Ulster	Ormeau	Ulster 85 (W Turner 4/22) and 38 (W Turner 6/6); North Down 47 (McGowan 5/21, Reid 5/24) and 77-5 (J Andrews 40no); North Down won by 5 wickets.
1889	North of Ireland	Armagh	Ormeau	Armagh 65 (Cuming 8/29) and 104 (Hughes 4/28); North 94 (Tarleton 4/40) and 77-2 (Staunton 37no); North won by 8 wickets.

=== 1890s ===
Season	Winners	Runners-up	Venue	Match Scores
1890	North Down	Final not played. (Note: North Down was awarded the Cup when Armagh declined to play the final on the scheduled date.)		
1891	North Down	North of Ireland	Ormeau	North 176 (Hughes 38, W Turner 4/53) and 82 (Cuming 38, W Turner 7/31); North Down 157 (Lindsay 75no, Hughes 5/60) and 102-8 (Couper 6/49); North Down won by 2 wickets.
1892	North Down	Ballymoney	Ormeau	North Down 282 (Combe 93, H W Andrews 56); Ballymoney 36 (Graham 6/21, W Turner 4/14) and 67 (W Turner 7/21); North Down won by an innings and 179 runs.
1893	North Down	Ulster	Ormeau	Ulster 76 (W Turner 4/25) and 89 (W Turner 4/35, Killen 4/26); North Down 198 (Milling 46, Reid 6/52); North Down won by an innings and 33 runs.
1894	North Down	Holywood	Ulster Cricket Ground	North Down 87 and 30 (Beggs 7/13, E Hughes 3/15); Holywood 62 (W Turner 5/28) and 33 (W Turner 6/12, O Andrews 4/13); North Down won by 22 runs.
1895	Ulster	Armagh	Cliftonville	Armagh 77 (Stewart 5/15, Reid 4/37) and 106 (Reid 4/38); Ulster 105 (Gaukrodger 32, Martin 5/47) and 79-7 (McCrum 3/21); Ulster won by 3 wickets.
1896	Cliftonville	Holywood	Ormeau	Holywood 130 (Higgett 7/49) and 90 (Hamilton 4/17, Higget 3/27); Cliftonville 94 (Erskine 8/42) and 128-6 (Beggs 4/28, Erskine 2/38); Cliftonville won by 4 wicket.
1897	North Down	North of Ireland	Ormeau	North Down 176 (O Andrews 73, Gillespie 7/73) and 229 (O Andrews 100); North 112 (Newett 58, W Turner 6/44) and 119 (W Turner 6/35); North Down won by 174 runs.
1898	North Down	Ulster	Ormeau	North Down 225 (Milling 80, Taylor 61, Reid 6/69); Ulster 52 (Graham 8/22) and 97 (Niblock 6/20, Graham 3/35); North Down won by an innings and 76 runs.
1899	Holywood	Ulster	Cliftonville	Holywood 189 (Harrington 46, Imrie 5/64) and 79-9; Ulster 60 (Erskine 5/30 inc hat-trick, Thomas 4/22) and 207 (Cleland 72no, Reynolds 49); Holywood won by 1 wicket.

=== 1900s ===
Season	Winners	Runners-up	Venue	Match Scores
1900	North of Ireland	North Down	Ormeau	North 206 (Thompson 110) and 3-0; North Down 94 (Reid 5/5, Ferris 4/29) and 114 (Reid 5/32); North won by 10 wickets.
1901	North of Ireland	Final not played. (Note: North of Ireland was awarded the Cup when North Down declined to play the final on the scheduled date.)		
1902	North of Ireland	Holywood	Cliftonville	Holywood 60 (Reid 5/13) and 257 (Holloway 65, S C B Erskine 64); North 226 (Davidson 70, Thompson 50, Smith hat-trick) and 94-2 (Taylor 38no); North won by 8 wickets.
1903	North of Ireland	Ulster	Cliftonville	North 198 (Andrews 94, Milliken 4/67); Ulster 62 (Andrews 5/22, Reid 4/28) and 77 (Andrews 4/26); North won by an innings and 59 runs.
1904	North of Ireland	North Down	Ormeau	North 195 (Andrews 43) and 131 (Niblock 5/13); North Down 104 (Andrews 5/32) and 45 (Gardiner 6/21); North won by 177 runs.
1905	Holywood	North Down	Ulster Cricket Ground	North Down 66 (Anderson 5/25) and 120 (D R Taylor 72no, Anderson 5/59); Holywood 152 and 35-5; Holywood won by 5 wickets.
1906	North of Ireland	North Down	Ulster Cricket Ground	North Down 115 (Andrews 7/34) and 105 (Wood 5/24); North 107 (Bruce 5/50, Niblock 5/36) and 117-7 (Bruce 4/48); North won by 3 wickets.
1907	North of Ireland	Holywood	Ormeau	Holywood 91 (Bruce 7/30) and 102 (Bruce 5/50, Andrews 4/47); North 177 (Anderson 4/71) and 17-1; North won by 9 wickets.
1908	North Down	Cliftonville	Ormeau	North Down 250 (McDonald 45, Coulter 45no, Moore 4/58) and 35-2; Cliftonville 76 (Graham 5/32, Crawford 5/43) and 204 (Wood 58, Graham 4/82); North Down won by 8 wickets.
1909	Ulster	North Down	Ormeau	Ulster 457 (Diamond 96, Jackson 92, Reynolds 80, Patrick 75, Glover 4/82); North Down 149 (Davidson 36, Coulter 43, Patrick 4/44, Milliken 4/50) and 219 (Andrews 97, Milliken 7/69); Ulster won by an innings and 89 runs.

=== 1910s ===
Season	Winners	Runners-up	Venue	Match Scores
1910	North of Ireland	Queen's University	Ormeau	North 224 (Moore 106, Birtill 70, Forsyth 5/51, Haydock 4/72); Queen's 60 (Birtill 6/24) and 133 (Andrews 5/53); North won by an innings and 31 runs.
1911	Ulster	Cliftonville	Ormeau	Ulster 171 (Martin 4/37, Moore 4/48) and 170 (Stevenson 59no, Moore 6/77); Cliftonville 209 (Tyndall 47, Milliken 7/73) and 50 (Milliken 6/23); Ulster won by 82 runs.
1912	North of Ireland	Ulster	Ormeau	Ulster 67 (Andrews 5/17, Pollock 5/50) and 110 (S.H. Jackson 52no, Andrews 9/44); North 141 (Andrews 57, S. Jackson 4/59) and 41-3; North won by 7 wickets.
1913	North Down	Waringstown	Ormeau	North Down 423 (W. Andrews 111, Anderson 80, Jas. Andrews 411); Waringstown 156 (Anderson 49, Coulter 4/37) and 170 (Scott 47, Taylor 4/46); North Down won by an innings and 97 runs.
1914	Waringstown	North Down	Ormeau	Waringstown 155 (Coulter 5/35) and 127 (Coulter 7/34); North Down 107 (T. McKenzie 4/24) and 104 (T. McKenzie 8/42); Waringstown won by 71 runs.
1915	no competition			
1916	no competition			
1917	no competition			
1918	no competition			
1919	North Down	North of Ireland	Ulster Cricket Ground	North Down 175 (Pollock 4/44) and 202 (Andrews 48, Anderson 43); North 201 (McClinton 96no, Maxwell 5/59) and 107 (Maxwell 3/33); North Down won by 69 runs.

=== 1920s ===
Season	Winners	Runners-up	Venue	Match Scores
1920	North Down	Cliftonville	Ormeau	Cliftonville 60 (Lea 5/26, Maxwell 4/14) and 102 (Maxwell 5/44, Lea 5/48); North Down 108 (Haydock 5/31, Stevenson 4/28) and 60-0; North Down won by 10 wickets.
1921	Waringstown	North Down	Ormeau	North Down 135 (H. McKenzie 4/20, Williamson 4/52) and 74 (Williamson 6/33, T. McKenzie 4/32); Waringstown 159 (Williamson 42, Hill 5/35) and 54-8 (Hiatt 4/26); Waringstown won by 2 wickets.
1922	Cliftonville	Waringstown	Ormeau	Cliftonville 155 (McCully 62, T. McKenzie 7/47) and 44 (T. McKenzie 6/29); Waringstown 100 (Walker 6/35) and 32 (Bowers 5/13); Cliftonville won by 67 runs.
1923	Downpatrick	Holywood	Ormeau	Holywood 76 (Fleming 7/39) and 134 (Anderson 56, Fleming 5/55); Downpatrick 201 (Harman 54no, Morrison 50, Barklie 4/61 inc hat-trick) and 13-0 (Sproule 5/54); Downpatrick won by 10 wickets.
1924	North Down	Waringstown	Ormeau	Waringstown 78 (Shields 4/8, Johnston 4/33) and 130 (Scott 37, Johnston 3/11); North Down 70 (Williamson 6/33) and 139-9 (Anderson 42, Williamson 3/53); North Down won by 1 wicket.
1925	North of Ireland	Cliftonville	Ormeau	Cliftonville 78 (Pollock 5/60) and 178 (McDonald 59, Pollock 5/37); North 151 (Walton 49) and 106-0 (Walton 53no, Pollock 42no); North won by 10 wickets.
1926	North Down	North of Ireland	Ormeau	North Down 337 (Jas McDonald 80, Taylor 55no) and 240 (Jas McDonald 57, Shields 51no); North 157 (Shields 5/51) and 150 (Sproule 35, Jas McDonald 5/41); North Down won by 270 runs.
1927	North Down	Holywood	Ormeau	Holywood 99 (Jas McDonald 4/27) and 59 (Jas McDonald 8/18); North Down 169 (Anderson 4/48, Parsons 4/33); North Down won by an innings and 11 runs.
1928	North Down	North of Ireland	Ulster Cricket Ground	North 177 (Shields 6/30) and 101 (Macdonald 4/40); North Down 221 (T. J. McDonald 60, Vint 5/52, Douglas 4/23) and 59-3; North Down won by 7 wickets.
1929	Lisburn	North Down	Ormeau	North Down 52 (T. Martin 5/15) and 141 (T. Martin 4/37); Lisburn 165 (Keery 50, Hunter 48, Shields 4/58) and 29-5 (Shields 3/14); Lisburn won by 5 wickets.

=== 1930s ===
Season	Winners	Runners-up	Venue	Match Scores
1930	Ulster	North Down	Ormeau	Ulster 169 (McCleery 71) and 130 (Shields 4/50); North Down 93 (McCleery 5/29) and 101 (Jas Macdonald 40); Ulster won by 105 runs.
1931	North Down	Ulster	Ormeau	North Down 119 (Graham 40) and 256 (T. F. Macdonald 108, McCleery 4/86); Ulster 74 (Jas Macdonald 8/26) and 155 (H. Jackson 70, Jas Macdonald 5/53); North Down won by 146 runs.
1932	North Down	Armagh	Ormeau	Armagh 121 (Barnes 40, T. J. Macdonald 4/12) and 118 (Livingstone 63, Morgan 5/50, Jas Macdonald 4/39); North Down 137 (Barnes 7/49) and 107-5 (T. J. Macdonald 39no); North Down won by 5 wickets.
1933	Woodvale	Lurgan	Ormeau	Lurgan 193 (Leathem 57no) and 118; Woodvale 452 (Matier 118, Carroll 101); Woodvale won by an innings and 141 runs.
1934	North Down	Woodvale	Ormeau	North Down 238 (T. J. Macdonald 66, McCleery 6/66) and 147 (Billingsley 6/48); Woodvale 157 (Jas Macdonald 5/48) and 97 (Shields 6/13); North Down won by 131 runs.
1935	North Down	Cliftonville	Ormeau	North Down 303 (Jas Macdonald 159no); Cliftonville 114 (Jas Macdonald 3/32) and 183 (Jas Macdonald 5/61, Shields 4/32); North Down won by an innings and 6 runs.
1936	North Down	Woodvale	Cliftonville	Woodvale 82 (Clarke 6/33) and 77 (Clarke 7/36); North Down 112 (T. J. Macdonald 35) and 49-6 (Armstrong 4/17); North Down won by 4 wickets.
1937	Woodvale	North Down	Cliftonville	North Down 331 (McKibbin 80, J. Shields 67, W. Shields 57, T. J. Macdonald 49, Billingsley 5/83) and 129 (Armstrong 4/21); Woodvale 226 (McCutcheon 56, Posnett 52, Mills 4/54, Clarke 4/69) and 237-9 (Wilson 58no, McCleery 50, Jas Macdonald 5/60); Woodvale won by 1 wicket.
1938	North of Ireland	Donacloney	Cliftonville	Donacloney 67 (R. N. Morgan 5/35, Boyd 4/8 inc. hat-trick) and 105 (R. N. Morgan 5/49, F. Jackson 4/10); North 189 (McCullough 5/68, Craig 4/73); North won by an innings and 17 runs.
1939	Woodvale	North Down	Ormeau	North Down 68 (Armstrong 7/17) and 81 (Armstrong 5/35); Woodvale 153 (Wilson 62, Jas Macdonald 6/43); Woodvale won by an innings and 4 runs.

=== 1940s ===
Season	Winners	Runners-up	Venue	Match Scores
1940 (Note: During the Second World War, the Cup final was reduced to one innings. The trophy was not awarded but a set of stumps was presented instead.)	Queen's University	Armagh	Cliftonville	Queen's 76 (McKinley 4/17, Barnes 4/36); Armagh 70 (Smith 5/15); Queen's won by 6 runs.
1941	Woodvale	Muckamore	Ormeau	Woodvale 188 (McComb 64, Pinkerton 6/98); Muckamore 53 (McCleery 4/22); Woodvale won by 135 runs.
1942	Lisburn	Waringstown	Ormeau	Lisburn 114 (Finlay 48, McCullough 5/46, Armstrong 4/31); Waringstown 113 (Burke 39, Bowden 5/30); Lisburn won by 1 runs.
1943	Waringstown	Woodvale	Ormeau	Waringstown 120 (Armstrong 4/41); Woodvale 66 (Hampton 5/14); Waringstown won by 54 runs.
1944	Waringstown	Cregagh	Ormeau	Waringstown 253 (Burke 55, Armstrong 46); Cregagh 223 (McCullough 5/53); Waringstown won by 30 runs.
1945	Downpatrick	Waringstown	Ormeau	Downpatrick 244 (J. E. Malone 63, Kelly 62, Telford 49, McCullough 4/36); Waringstown 166 (Ferguson 6/36); Downpatrick won by 78 runs.
1946	Lisburn	North of Ireland	Ormeau	Lisburn 207 (Blaney 55, Hill 4/75) and 90 (Graham 3/21, Hill 3/22); North 77 (Bowden 5/33, Simpson 5/33) and 154 (Shearer 67, W. McCloy 4/19, Bowden 4/50); Lisburn won by 66 runs.
1947	Sion Mills	Armagh	Ormeau	Armagh 238 (Craig 82, Wherry 56, McCrea 5/61) and 206 (Flood 3/48, MacFarlane 3/55); Sion Mills 319 (MacFarlane 117, Flood 87, Armstrong 5/74) and 126-9 (Eadie 4/32, Armstrong 4/44); Sion Mills won by 1 wicket.
1948	Woodvale	CPA	Ormeau	CPA 146 (Love 38, Wiggins 6/59) and 110 (Wilson 5/36); Woodvale 127 (McKee 41, Shaw 4/30, Newburn 4/43) and 130/7 (Upritchard 44no, McCleery 34, Newburn 5/50); Woodvale won by 3 wickets.
1949	Woodvale	Waringstown	Cliftonville	Woodvale 269 (Warke 46, Barnes 4/83); Waringstown 126 and 133 (McMeekin 50, Barnes 44, Armstrong 5/28, Wiggins 4/35); Woodvale won by an innings and 10 runs.

=== 1950s ===
Season	Winners	Runners-up	Venue	Match Scores
1950	Woodvale	Waringstown	Ormeau	Woodvale 168 (Topping 42) and 124 (Craig 41, Hampton 7/38); Waringstown 89 (Armstrong 5/19, Wilson 5/42) and 86-9 (Wiggins 4/13); Woodvale won by 107 runs.
1951	North of Ireland	Lisburn	Ormeau	North 180 (Shearer 37, Bowden 6/46) and 304 (Marks 81, Shearer 70, Morrison 62); Lisburn 81 (Hool 5/21) and 342 (Bowden 146no, McCloy 83, Hill 4/89); North won by 61 runs.
1952	Woodvale	Armagh	Ormeau	Armagh 65 (Wilson 5/21, H. Armstrong 5/26) and 240 (Spearman 93, Wilson 4/79, H. Armstrong 4/83); Woodvale 221 (Graham 52, Upritchard 42, L. Armstrong 7/76) and 89-7 (Berryman 50, L. Armstrong 4/35); Woodvale won by 3 wickets.
1953	Downpatrick	Waringstown	Ormeau	Waringstown 197 (McMullan 56, Fawcett 54, Roberts 4/66) and 112 (Kelly 5/23, Roberts 5/51); Downpatrick 268 (Calvert 91, Ferguson 77, Ferris 5/70) and 43-3; Downpatrick won by 7 wickets.
1954	Woodvale	Lurgan	Ormeau	Lurgan 91 (Adamson 48no, Wilson 5/25) and 81 (Scott 4/18); Woodvale 188 (Wilson 47, Craig 42, Warke 41, Baxter 4/41); Woodvale won by an innings and 16 runs.
1955	Lisburn	Waringstown	Ormeau	Waringstown 116 (Bowden 7/35) and 142 (Fawcett 44, Bowden 3/29); Lisburn 316 (Robinson 117, Bowden 47, Kelly 42no, McMullan 7/92); Lisburn won by an innings and 58 runs.
1956	North of Ireland	Lurgan	Ormeau	North 134 (Hewitt 34) and 160 (Pollock 47, Bingham 4/44); Lurgan 164 (Mitchell 55, Hool 5/46, Russell 4/33) and 112 (Hewitt 4/34); North won by 18 runs.
1957	Lisburn	Woodvale	Ormeau	Lisburn 336 (Hunter 133, Walker 53, Wilson 4/109); Woodvale 91 (Bowden 6/48) and 118 (Bowden 7/28); Lisburn won by an innings and 127 runs.
1958	Lisburn & Sion Mills; Trophy shared		Ormeau	Lisburn 235 (Bowden 71, W. McCloy 51, Flood 5/80) and 36-3; Sion Mills 150 (Gallagher 67, Bowden 7/44); After a number of postponements due to poor weather, the match was declared a draw and the trophy shared.
1959	Lisburn	Queen's University	Ormeau	Queen's 86 (Andrews 31) and 85 (Woods 6/15); Lisburn 148 (T. McCloy 89no, Anderson 5/52) and 25-0; Lisburn won by 10 wickets.

=== 1960s ===
Season	Winners	Runners-up	Venue	Match scores
1960	North of Ireland	Lurgan	Ormeau	Lurgan 87 (N. B. Hool 6/36) and 108 (J McClatchey 58, N. B. Hool 4/36); North 150-9 declared (J. S. Pollock 72) and 49-2; North won by 8 wickets.
1961	Lisburn	Woodvale	Ormeau	Woodvale 179 (K. Kirkpatrick 62, D. Monteith 5/45) and 106 (D. Monteith 5/39, J. Bowden 5/42); Lisburn 148 (H. Martin 51, K. Kirkpatrick 8/43) and 138-2 (H. Martin 56 no); Lisburn won by 8 wickets.
1962	Lisburn	Muckamore	Ormeau	Lisburn 163 and 189 (T. McCloy 75, A. McQuilken 5/64); Muckamore 93 (J. Bowden 5/23) and 145 (J. Bowden 5/48); Lisburn won by 114 runs.
1963	Muckamore	Downpatrick	Ormeau	Muckamore 243 (A. McQuilken 82, W. Chambers 68) and 174 (J. McCormick 50 no; N. Ferguson 8/77); Downpatrick 195 (N. Ferguson 59, H. Linehan 52) and 103 (A. McQuilken 5/40); Muckamore won by 119 runs.
1964	Instonians	Sion Mills	Ormeau	Instonians 187 (R. B. Matier 73, J. Flood 5/63) and 159 (J Flood 6/28); Sion Mills 201 (T. Harpur 108) and 127 (B. Anderson 4-47); Instonians won by 18 runs.
1965	Waringstown	Sion Mills	Ormeau	Waringstown 189 (R. Harrison 50, J. Flood 5/61) and 249 (J. Harrison 88, W. Kidd 4/81); Sion Mills 137 (G. Irwin 4-60, E. McMullan 4-20) and 144 (A. Finlay 51, W. Ferris 6/60); Waringstown won by 157 runs.
1966	Downpatrick	Lisburn	Ormeau	Downpatrick 186 (Hutton 43, Monteith 4/72) and 189 (Hutton 47, A. Linehan 42, Hunter 8/76); Lisburn 97 (Briggs 4/19, Ferguson 4/17) and 138 (Ferguson 5/41); Downpatrick won by 140 runs.
1967	Waringstown	Muckamore	Ormeau	Waringstown 215-5 (Reith 100, D. Harrison 72) and 191 (Reith 38, Campbell 4/48); Muckamore 138 (Healey 3/31) and 121 (I. Harrison 5/57, McMullan 4/47); Waringstown won by 147 runs.
1968	Waringstown	Lisburn	Ormeau	Waringstown 195-9 (Reith 44) and 212-5 (R. Harrison 78, D. Harrison 55); Lisburn 180 (Partridge 45, Martin 44, Walker 43) and 158 (Martin 60, McMullan 5/44); Waringstown won by 69 runs.
1969	North of Ireland	Queen's University	Ormeau	North 136 (Martin 3/39, Cunningham 3/48) and 116 (Martin 6/39); Queen's 86 (Hewitt 4/32, Hool 3/16) and 102 (Lyness 6/34, Hool 3/36); North won by 64 runs.

=== 1970s ===
Season	Winners	Runners-up	Venue	Match Scores
1970	Waringstown	Lisburn	Ormeau	Waringstown 140 (J. Harrison 57, Monteith 6/39) and 187-6 (D. Harrison 48no, Monteith 5/58); Lisburn 114 (I. Harrison 4/24, Anderson 4/25) and 109 (Bowden 42no, I. Harrison 5/33); Waringstown won by 104 runs.
1971	Waringstown	Downpatrick	Ormeau	Waringstown 266-4 (Reith 100, D. Harrison 55no, R. Harrison 53) and 209-7 (R. Harrison 87no, Reith 40); Downpatrick 165 (Ferguson 40no) and 85 (I. Harrison 6/28); Waringstown won by 225 runs.
1972	Lurgan	Muckamore	Ormeau	Lurgan 186-2 (Hunter 87no, Kavanagh 77) and 164-4 (Hunter 65no, McQuilken 5/67); Muckamore 97 (Johnston 4/35) and 73 (Johnston 5/29); Lurgan won by 180 runs.
1973	Waringstown	Queen's University	Ormeau	Queen's 126 (Farmer 40, Anderson 4/42) and 166-8 (Crothers 48); Waringstown 155 (D. Harrison 69, Halliday 4/34) and 138-3 (I. Harrison 57); Waringstown won by 7 wickets.
1974	Waringstown	Ballymena	Ormeau	Waringstown 226-5 (Anderson 76no, J. Harrison 53) and 34-2; Ballymena 118 (I. Harrison 6/30, Cousins 4/40) and 137 (Halliday 40, I. Harrison 5/42); Waringstown won by 8 wickets.
1975	Waringstown	North Down	Ormeau	Waringstown 192-4 (J. Harrison 102no) and 130-9 (J. Harrison 37, Hunter 4/40); North Down 56 (McGill 4/28) and 135-6 (Artt 66no); Waringstown won by 131 runs.
1976	Waringstown	Lisburn	Strangford Road	Waringstown 179-9 (Anderson 47, Monteith 5/71) and 134 (Monteith 5/64, Lyness 4/26); Lisburn 153 (Schofield 50) and 71 (McGill 4/42); Waringstown won by 89 runs.
1977	Downpatrick	Lisburn		
1978	Waringstown	Woodvale		
1979	Waringstown	Woodvale		Waringstown won by 1 run.

=== 1980s ===
Season	Winners	Runners-up	Venue	Match Scores
1980	North	North Down		
1981	North Down	Ballymena		
1982	North	Downpatrick		
1983	Waringstown	Lurgan		
1984	Downpatrick	North		
1985	Lisburn	North		
1986	Waringstown	North		
1987	Waringstown	Lurgan		
1988	Waringstown	Downpatrick		
1989	Lurgan	North		

=== 1990s ===
Season	Winners	Runners-up	Venue	Match scores
1990	North of Ireland	Lurgan		
1991	North Down	Woodvale		North Down 241-3 (M Clark 111, C McCrum 60) and 245-7 (C McCrum 65, J Gilliland 51, M Clark 50, Akram Raza 4-46); Woodvale 242-8 (Akram Raza 146) and 237 (Akram Raza 67, W Adams 4-44); North Down won by 7 runs.
1992	Waringstown	North of Ireland		Waringstown 243-4 (S Harrison 117) and 186; North 115 (P McCrum 4-22) and 156; Waringstown won by 158 runs.
1993	Waringstown	North Down		North Down 127-7 and 74 (G Harrison 5-13); Waringstown 122-6 and 84-3; Waringstown won by 7 wickets.
1994	Lisburn and North Down; Trophy shared			North Down 160-9 (C McCrum 58, D Heasley 4-37) and 203-7 (A Semple 61no); Lisburn 158-8 and 205 (M Blair 57, T McKeown 52, R Haire 4-50); Match tied.
1995	Waringstown	Lurgan		Lurgan 144-7 and 152 (R McCollum 57, A Spence 4-12); Waringstown 188-9 (J Mathers 4-38) and 109-2; Waringstown won by 8 wickets.
1996	Lurgan	Lisburn		Lisburn 90 and 182-9; Lurgan 120 and 153-5 (R McCollum 51); Lurgan won by 5 wickets.
1997	Downpatrick	North		Downpatrick 244-5 (J Patterson 96, G Ferguson 57) and 174 (R Shilliday 51, D Johnston 6-16); North 190-6 (S Redpath 61no) and 165; Downpatrick won by 63 runs.
1998	Woodvale	Instonians		Woodvale 155-7 and 218-6 (S Warke 102, A Rutherford 68); Instonians 158-8 (C McQuay 54) and 200 (J Walsh 50); Woodvale won by 15 runs.
1999	North of Ireland	Woodvale		North 223-8 (D Finlay 65, J Bouyens 63 no) and 145-9; Woodvale 193-9 (R Warnock 78 no) and 160; North won by 15 runs.

=== 2000s ===
Season	Winners	Runners-up	Venue	Match Scores
2000	North Down	Woodvale		North Down 171-7 (A White 67) and 116 (S Donnelly 4-21); Woodvale 130-9 and 109; North Down won by 48 runs.
2001	North Down	North		North Down 287-3 (Ryan Haire 109no, P Shields 74no) and 167 (Robin Haire 54; A O'Prey 5-39); North 203 (R Coetzee 76) and 158; North Down won by 93 runs.
2002	Lurgan	North Down		North Down 140-7; Lurgan 141-3 (G Morrison 65no); Lurgan won by 7 wickets.
2003	North Down	Waringstown	Stormont	North Down 214-8 (A White 80, Robin Haire 50, S Kidd 4/10) and 210-5 (D Kennedy 93no, A White 54); Waringstown 167 (J Bushe 56) and 163; North Down won by 94 runs.
2004	North Down	Belfast Harlequins	Stormont	North Down 242-4 (D Kennedy 105no) and 165-8 (D Kennedy 64); Belfast Harlequins 199-9 and 189 (W Horwood 79); North Down won by 19 runs.
2005	North Down	Downpatrick	Strangford Road	Downpatrick 208-9 (G Ferguson 57) and 108; North Down 217-5 (R Coetzee 51no, N Russell 51) and 100-1 (D Kennedy 52*); North Down won by 8 wickets.
2006	Waringstown	CIYMS	Strangford Road	Waringstown 303-5 (J Hall 130, K McCallan 92no) and 47-1; CIYMS 194-5 (D Heasley 68) and 155 (R Lucas 54); Waringstown won by 9 wickets.
2007	North Down	Waringstown	Strangford Road	Waringstown 187; North Down 188-6 (D Kennedy 80); North Down won by 4 wickets.
2008	Civil Service North of Ireland	Waringstown	Strangford Road	CSNI 150-9 (N Jones 51); Waringstown 146; CSNI won by 4 runs.
2009	Instonians	North Down	The Green	North Down 176-7 (J Terrett 51) (Duckworth Lewis par score 189 in 30 overs); Instonians 191-2 (28.3 overs D van Wyk 64, R McCann 61, A White 50no); Instonians won by 8 wickets.

=== 2010s ===
Season	Winners	Runners-up	Venue	Match Scores
2010	North Down	CIYMS	The Green	North Down 262-6 (T Khan 89, N Russell 57); CIYMS 188; North Down won by 74 runs.
2011	Waringstown	Civil Service North of Ireland	Wallace Park	Waringstown 190-8 (K McCallan 63); CSNI 116 (L Nelson 5-23); Waringstown won by 74 runs.
2012	Instonians	North Down	The Green	North Down 182 (A Sutherland 58, E Moleon 3-25); Instonians 184-2 (J Shannon 99no, A White 57no); Instonians won by 8 wickets.
2013	Waringstown	Instonians	The Green	Waringstown 265-6 (K McCallan 110, O Pienaar 62, Z Rushe 2-47, C Brome 2-47, B Wylie 2-50); Instonians 178 (N Russell 43, J Stevenson 39, E Moleon 28no, G Kidd 5/33, O Pienaar 2/24); Waringstown won by 87 runs.
2014	Civil Service North of Ireland	Waringstown	The Green	Waringstown 156 (48.1 overs, S Khan 38, A Coulter 3/25, S Getkate 2/35); CSNI 109/5 (36.5 overs, A Cowden 45, J van der Merwe 26) (D/L par score was 108 in 37 overs); CSNI won by 5 wickets.
2015	CIYMS	Instonians	The Green	CIYMS 259-7 (R van der Dussen 117, J Matchett 46, J Thompson 68, Z Rushe 2/47, E Moleon 3/80); Instonians 195 (N Russell 49, J Shannon 61, N Jones 3/45, J Cameron-Dow 4/17, T Britton 2/57) (D/L par score was 245 in 46 overs); CIYMS won by 50 runs.
2016	Civil Service North of Ireland	CIYMS	The Green	CIYMS 243-7 (N Jones 38, J Kemp 68, S Chambers 42, J Thompson 37, Z Rushe 22no, J Costain 2/27, A Blain 2/73); CSNI 244-5 (A Cowden 22, S Getkate 64, J van der Merwe 98no, G McCarter 25no, J Kemp 2/39); CSNI won by 5 wickets.
2017	CIYMS	Instonians	The Green	Instonians 208 (Ni Smith 67, J Shannon 36, E Moleon 39, N Jones 2/28, J Mulder 3/51); CIYMS 209-4 (N Jones 80, M McGillivray 20, R Hunter 65no); CIYMS won by 6 wickets.
2018	Waringstown	Civil Service North of Ireland	The Green	CSNI 285-4 (M Ellison 139, A Malan 52, J Kennedy 37, L Nelson 3-43); Waringstown 286-4 (A Dennison 145 no, J McCollum 73, G Thompson 25 no); Waringstown won by six wickets.
2019	CIYMS	Instonians	The Green	CIYMS 220 (O Pienaar 27, J van der Merwe 50, R Hunter 39, M Adair 63, J Manley 4-42, S Getkate 3-38) Instonians 122 (O Metcalfe 48, S Getkate 26, N Jones 4-31, J Mulder 2-17, T Britton 2-9); CIYMS beat Instonians by 98 runs.

=== 2020s ===
Season	Winners	Runners-up	Venue	Match Scores
2020	not played			
2021	CIYMS	North Down	The Green	CIYMS 269-8 (50 overs) (C Dougherty 20, J Cameron-Dowe 43, J van der Merwe 22, N Jones 51, J Mulder 28no; C Young 3-41); North Down 142 (35.1 overs) (A Chore 54; M Adair 4-53, N Jones 2-40, G Kennedy 2-17); CIYMS won by 127 runs.
2022	CIYMS	CSNI	The Green	CSNI 161 (40.5 overs) (L Georgeson 20, M Ellison 30, S Thompson 32, A Johnston 23; K Dudgeon 3-33, G Kennedy 3-29, J Mulder 4-15); CIYMS 162-0 (24.2 overs) (R Adair 103no, C Dougherty 51no); CIYMS won by 10 wickets.
2023	Waringstown	Carrickfergus	Stormont	Waringstown 354-4 (50 overs) (A Dennison 109, P Botha 22, M Topping 150, G Thompson 39no; C van der Walt 2-68); Carrickfergus 318 (50 overs) (J Egan 87, C van der Walt 97, B Cave 51; J Mitchell 2-62, B Snell 3-40, R Allen 2-45); Waringstown won by 36 runs.
2024	Muckamore	Lisburn	Stormont	Lisburn 265-8 (50 overs) (J Waite 41, M Adair 56, G Halliday 45no, D Miller 22; S Suresh 3-43, J van der Merwe 2-30); Muckamore 170-3 (31.3 overs) (S Suresh 30, M Gleghorne 47no, J van der Merwe 24, B Calitz 42no); Muckamore won by 7 wickets (DLS).
2025	Waringstown	Instonians	Stormont	Instonians 189 (40.1 overs, C Carmichael 24, N Rock 26, T Mayes 2-42, J Mitchell 2-37, D Van Der Merwe 2-51, R Allen 2-34, G Thompson 2-18) Waringstown 190-1 (42.5 overs, S Topping 23, A Dennison 90*, J McCollum 71*) Waringstown beat Instonians by 9 wickets
2026	CSNI	Instonians	Stormont	

== Summary of winners ==
Team	Wins
North Down	32 (1 shared)
Waringstown	28
North	20
Woodvale	10
Lisburn	10 (2 shared)
Downpatrick	7
CIYMS	5
Lurgan	4
Ulster	4
Civil Service North	4
Instonians	3
Cliftonville	2
Holywood	2
Sion Mills	2 (1 shared)
Muckamore	2
Queen's University	1

== See also ==
- NCU Senior League
- Ulster Cup
- NCU Junior Cup
- Leinster Senior Cup
- North West Senior Cup
