= Sport in Belfast =

Watching and playing sports is an important part of culture in Belfast, Northern Ireland where almost six out of ten (59%) of the adult population regularly participate in one or more sports. Belfast has several notable sports teams playing a diverse variety of sports including football (Windsor Park being the home of the Northern Ireland national football team as well as Linfield F.C.), rugby (including at Ravenhill's Kingspan Stadium, home of former European champions Ulster Rugby), traditional Irish Gaelic games, and North American sports such as American football and ice hockey (at the SSE Arena where the multiple time Elite Ice Hockey League champion Belfast Giants are based. The Belfast Marathon is run annually on May Day, and attracted 14,300 participants in 2007. Cycling, triathlon and athletics are also popular as both participation and spectator sports, with the first two stages of the 2014 Giro d'Italia starting from Belfast City Centre, and the annual high profile Belfast International Cross Country event being held in the grounds of Stormont Castle every year until 2009. The Stormont Estate is also one of the four home grounds for the Ireland cricket team, alongside Bready, Malahide and Clontarf, and also hosts the Northern Cricket Union provincial teams.

== Football ==
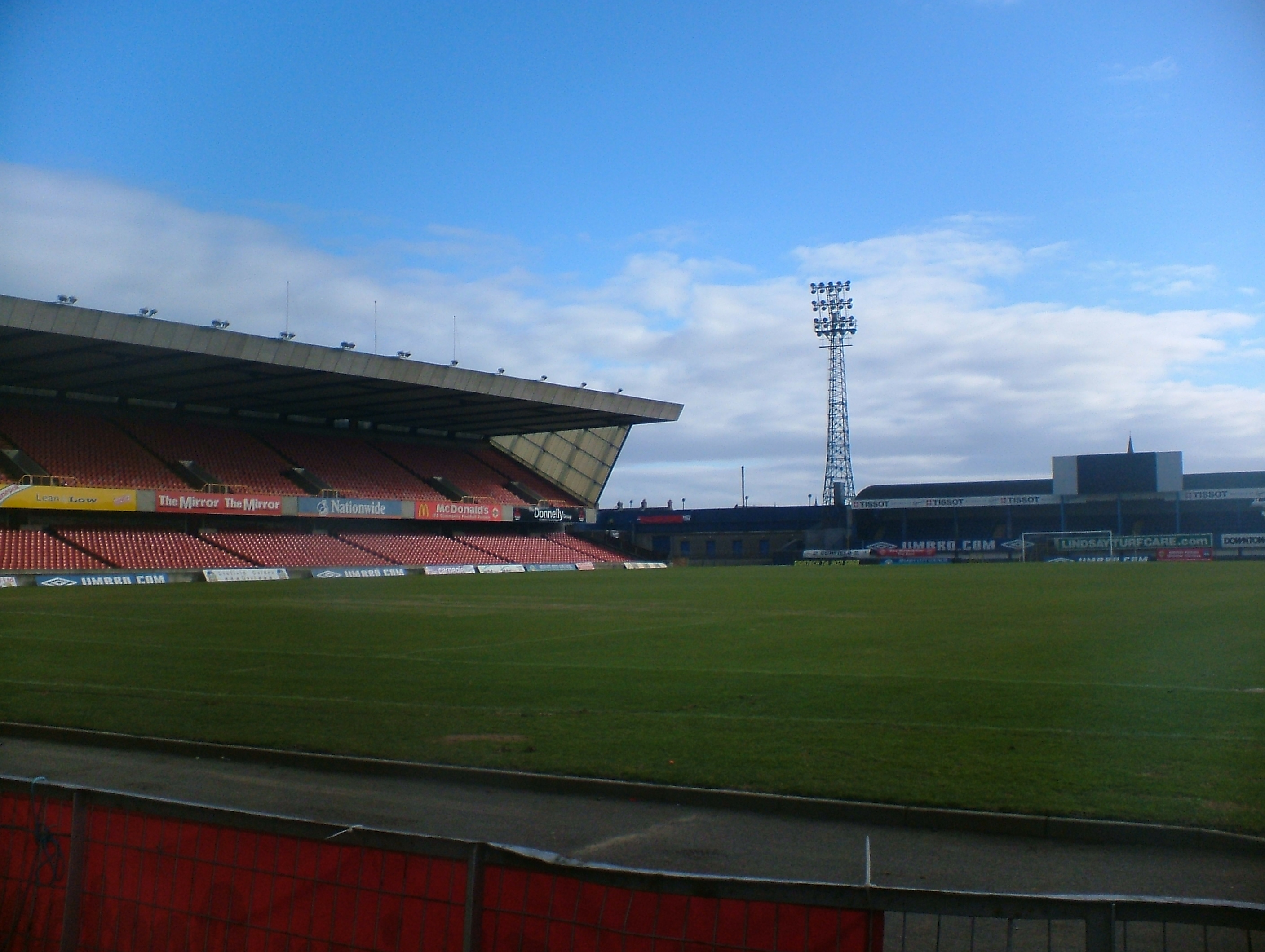
Windsor Park

The Northern Ireland national football team, ranked 54th in the February 2019 FIFA World Rankings plays its home matches at Windsor Park. Belfast was the home town of the renowned Northern Irish footballer, George Best who died in November 2005. On the day he was buried in the city, 100,000 people lined the route from his home on the Cregagh Road to Roselawn cemetery. Since his death the City Airport has been named after him and a trust has been set up to fund a memorial to him in the city centre.

Four NIFL Irish League football teams are based in Belfast; Crusaders, Cliftonville F.C. Glentoran, and Linfield F.C. NIFL Championship teams include Dundela, Harland & Wolff Welders F.C., Knockbreda F.C. and PSNI F.C.

Intermediate-level clubs Queen's University, Newington Youth and Sport & Leisure Swifts compete in the NIFL Premier Intermediate League. Albert Foundry F.C., Bloomfield F.C., Colin Valley, Crumlin Star F.C., Dunmurry Rec., Dunmurry Young Men F.C., East Belfast F.C., Grove United F.C., Immaculata F.C., Iveagh United, Malachians F.C., Orangefield Old Boys, Rosario Youth Club F.C., St Luke's, St Patrick's Young Men F.C., Shankill United F.C., Short Brothers F.C., Sirocco Works F.C. and Suffolk compete in the Northern Amateur Football League and Brantwood, Donegal Celtic and St James Swifts in the Ballymena & Provincial League.

Notable defunct clubs include Belfast Celtic F.C., one of the most successful teams in Ireland until it withdrew permanently from the Irish League in 1949. The club was refounded in 2019 when Sport & Leisure Swifts F.C. rebranded.

== Gaelic football and hurling ==
Gaelic football is one of the most popular spectator sports in the island of Ireland. Casement Park, in West Belfast has a capacity of 32,000 which makes it the second largest Gaelic Athletic Association ground in Ulster. It was named after Sir Roger Casement, one of the revolutionaries of the 1916 Easter Rising. Home to Antrim GAA, Casement was regularly host to finals in the Ulster Hurling Championship, which Antrim dominated before it was suspended. Football finals, traditionally have been played in Clones, County Monaghan.

Queen's University and the University of Ulster, Jordanstown compete in the Sigerson Cup. This is the top division championship of university Gaelic football in Ireland. They also compete in the Fitzgibbon Cup, which is the Hurling university championship equivalent.

== Rugby Union ==
1999 European champions Ulster, play at Ravenhill Stadium in South Belfast. The All-Ireland League is the national league for the 50 senior rugby union clubs in Ireland. There are three Belfast clubs in the league: Malone and Queen's University (Division 2A) and Belfast Harlequins (Division 2B). The Ulster Senior League and the Ulster Senior Cup are also competitions entered by senior rugby clubs in Ulster.

There are seven junior clubs in Belfast: Belfast Met, CIYMS, Civil Service, Cooke, Grosvenor, Instonians and PSNI; and six schools play rugby: Campbell College, Belfast Royal Academy, Grosvenor Grammar School, Methodist College Belfast, Royal Belfast Academical Institution and Wellington College.

== Cricket ==
Belfast boasts Ireland's premier cricket venue at Stormont, Belfast. The Ireland cricket team plays many of its home games at this venue, which, in 2006, also hosted the first ever one-day international (ODI) between Ireland and England. In 2007, Ireland, India and South Africa played a triangular series of one-day internationals at Stormont, and in 2008 the qualifying tournament for the ICC World Twenty20 was held there.

At club level, Belfast has nine senior teams: CIYMS, Instonians and Civil Service North of Ireland are in the Premier League of the NCU Senior League; Cregagh and Woodvale are in Section 1; BISC are in Section 2; and Cooke Collegians, Dunmurry and Newforge are in Section 3.

== Hockey ==
Hockey is a major participatory sport in Belfast, for both men and women. There are four senior men's clubs: Instonians, Cliftonville, NICS and Queen's University; and one junior club: PSNI.

There are nine senior ladies' clubs: Pegasus, Belfast Harlequins, Victorians, Knock, Queen's University, CIYMS, NICS, PSNI, Instonians and Cooke.

== Ice hockey ==
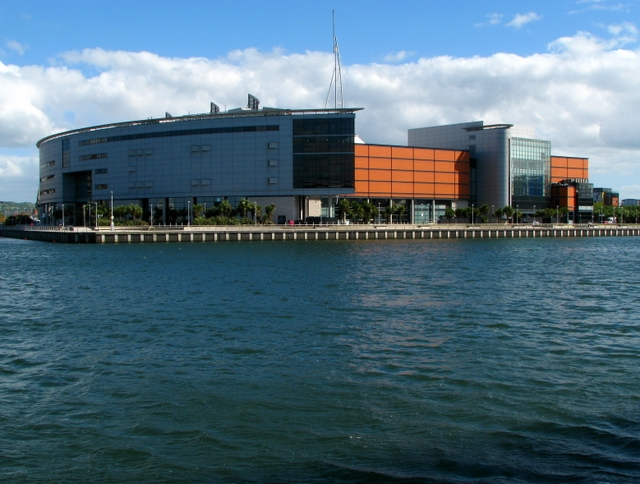
The Odyssey Arena

Belfast is represented in the Elite Ice Hockey League by Ireland's first professional ice hockey team, the Belfast Giants. The game was brought to Belfast by Canadian businessman Bob Zeller in 2000. The team won the British Ice Hockey Superleague Championship in 2002 and were crowned the Elite League Champion in 2006. Ex-NHL star Theo Fleury played for the team and was named the most valuable player in the league during his time there. Home matches are played at the Odyssey Arena and watched by up to 7000 fans.

== Roller derby ==
Belfast Roller Derby was founded in 2010, and was the first roller derby league in Northern Ireland.

== Other sports ==
- Double world champion Alex "Hurricane" Higgins and Joe Swail are both professional snooker players from Belfast. The city also runs its own District Snooker League.
- Belfast Knights and Belfast Trojans American football teams represent Belfast in the IAFL, competing for the Shamrock Bowl.
- Belfast has produced several world champion boxers including Wayne McCullough and Rinty Monaghan. The Ultimate Fighting Championship recently announced that UFC 72 will take place at Odyssey Arena on 16 June 2007.
- The Belfast Marathon is run annually on May Day, attracting 14,300 participants in 2007.
- In 2013 Belfast held the World Police and Fire Games.
- Dave Finlay, a professional wrestler, is from Belfast.

== See also ==
- Sport in Northern Ireland
- Sport in the United Kingdom
