= Raymond Hunter =

Irish sportsman (1938–2020)

Personal information
- Born: 3 April 1938; Belfast, Northern Ireland
- Died: 9 December 2020 (aged 82)
- Batting: Right-handed
- Bowling: Right-arm medium

International information
- National side: Ireland

Career statistics
Competition	First-class
Matches	11
Runs scored	202
Batting average	11.22
100s/50s	0/0
Top score	39
Balls bowled	996
Wickets	19
Bowling average	23.42
5 wickets in innings	1
10 wickets in match	0
Best bowling	5/22
Catches/stumpings	11/–
- Source: CricketArchive, 15 November 2022

William Raymond Hunter (3 April 1938 – 9 December 2020) was a Northern Irish cricketer and rugby union player. He played for Ireland in both sports. In cricket he won 28 international caps and played in 11 first-class matches. In rugby he played ten times for Ireland in the Five Nations, scoring one try. He also played for the British and Irish Lions.

== Early life ==
Raymond Hunter was born in Belfast on 3 April 1938. He attended Wallace High School in Lisburn and played international hockey and football for the Ireland schoolboys teams. After leaving school he worked in insurance.

== Cricket ==
Hunter played cricket, using his 6 feet (1.8 m) height to his advantage as a right-handed batsman and right-arm medium pace bowler. His rugby training also served him well in the field where his speed made him an excellent cover point. Hunter played junior-level cricket at Dunmurry.

Hunter started his club cricket career with Lisburn Cricket Club at the age of 17 and won the Senior Cup Final in his first season. In 1957 his score of 133 helped Lisburn win the NCU Challenge Cup and remains one of the best individual scores in the final of the competition. Hunter moved to Lurgan Cricket Club in the 1960s. He was top scorer for Lurgan in the 1972 Senior Challenge Cup Final, giving the club their first win in the competition.

=== International career ===
Hunter played 28 times for the Ireland cricket team between 1957 and 1967 including eleven first-class matches. Hunter made his debut for Ireland against the Free Foresters in August 1957. He scored 74 not out in the only Irish innings, his highest score for Ireland. He played two matches against New Zealand in July 1958, before making his first-class debut against Scotland later that month. He finished the year with matches against Worcestershire and the MCC.

He played four times for Ireland in 1959; against Scotland, Lancashire, Leicestershire and the MCC. He played just once in 1960, against Leicestershire. He played four times in 1961, including two internationals against Australia. In a match that year against the MCC, he took 5/22 in the MCC first innings, his best bowling performance for Ireland.

He then spent almost two years out of the Ireland side, returning for two matches against the West Indies in June 1963. He remained a semi-regular in the team over the following four years, playing internationals against India, New Zealand and Scotland in addition to other matches. His last first-class match was against Hampshire in September 1965 and his last game for Ireland against Combined Services in August 1967.

=== Statistics ===
In all matches for Ireland, Hunter scored 800 runs at an average of 21.05, scoring three half-centuries. He took 33 wickets at an average of 29.97, taking five wickets in an innings twice. In first-class cricket, he scored 202 runs at an average of 11.22 and took 19 wickets at an average of 23.42. He took five wickets in an innings once.

== Rugby union ==
Hunter also played rugby union to a high level, playing ten times for Ireland in the Five Nations between 1962 and 1966, scoring one try. He also played for the British and Irish Lions.

== Personal life ==
Hunter was married to Maureen and had three sons: Alan, Neil and Graeme. All three played cricket for the first team at Lurgan. Alan and Neil played in the first team of Portadown Rugby Football Club, as did his grandson Stephen.

Hunter served on the committee of Lurgan Cricket Club and managed the redevelopment of the cricket square at the club and general improvements to the grounds. His time on the committee included a key period when the club merged with Lurgan Rugby Club and moved to Pollock Park in 1980. Hunter died on 9 December 2020.

== See also ==
- List of Irish cricket and rugby union players
