= Cricket in Ireland =

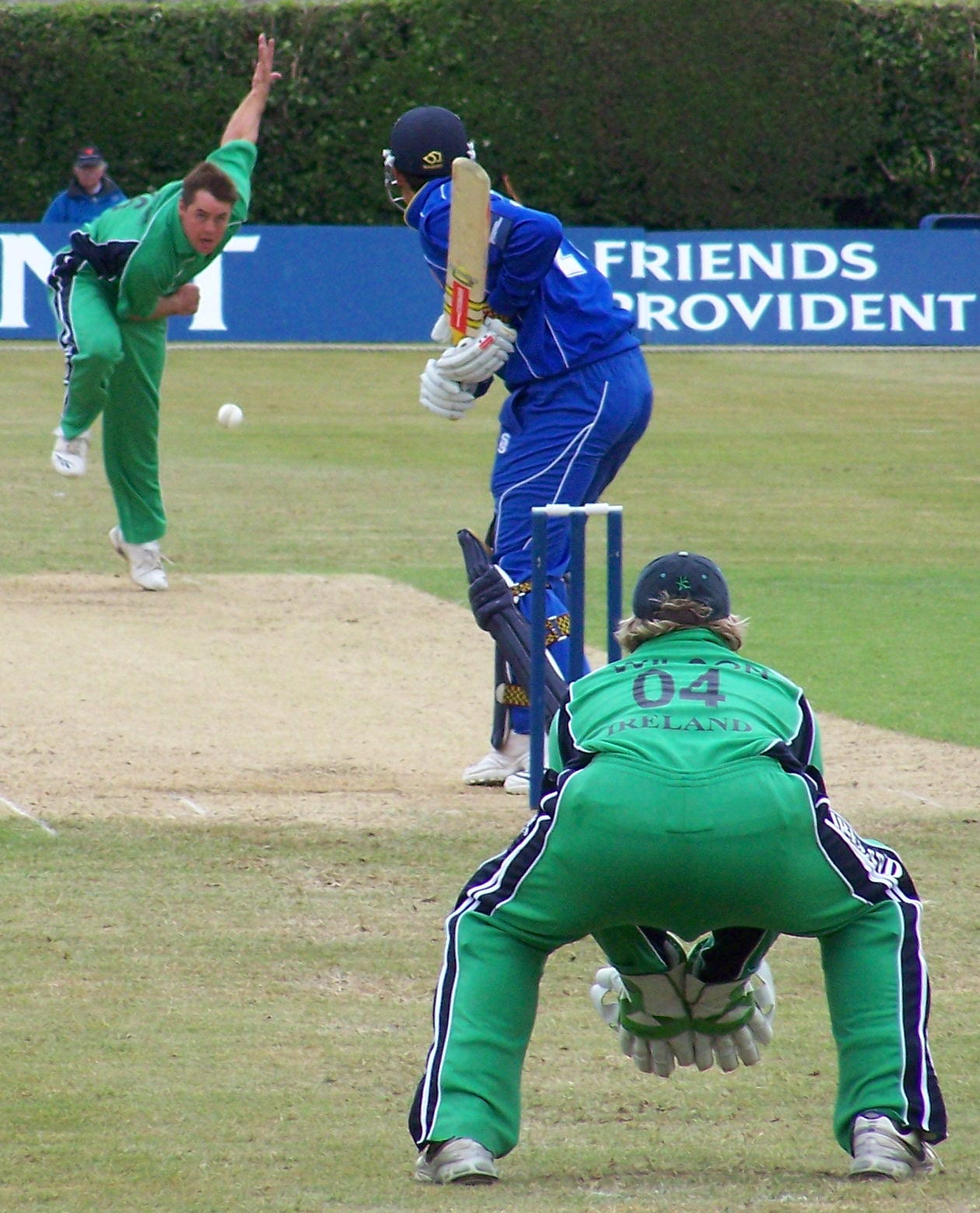
- Ireland compete against Essex at Castle Avenue
- Country: Ireland
- Governing body: Cricket Ireland
- National teams: Ireland Men; Ireland Women; Ireland U-19 Men; Ireland U-19 Women

National competitions
- List: First Class Cricket; Inter-Provincial Championship; List A Cricket; Inter-Provincial Cup; T20 Cricket; Inter-Provincial Trophy

Club competitions
- List: Irish Senior Cup

International competitions
- List: Men's national team; Cricket World Cup: Super 8 (2007); Men's T20 World Cup: Super 8 (2009); Men's U-19 national team; Under-19 Cricket World Cup: Super 6 (2024); Women's national team; Women's Cricket World Cup: Quarter-finals (1997); Women's T20 World Cup: Group Stage (2014, 2016, 2018, 2023); Women's U-19 national team; Under-19 Women's T20 World Cup: Super 6 (2023, 2025)

Cricket in Ireland is governed by Cricket Ireland, which maintains Ireland's men's and women's cricket teams. Like several other sports in Ireland, cricket is organised on an All-Ireland basis. Following the team's success in the 2007 Cricket World Cup, the sport's popularity increased in Ireland. The country was, until 2017, an associate member of the International Cricket Council and played in tournaments like the World Cricket League and ICC Intercontinental Cup, which are qualifying rounds for associate teams to the Cricket World Cup and the ICC World Twenty20. Ireland qualified for the 2009 ICC World Twenty20, the 2011 Cricket World Cup and 2010 ICC World Twenty20. In the 2011 World Cup, they beat England in the group matches.

In 2017, domestic cricket in Ireland was recognised as first-class cricket and, in recognition of their progress as a cricketing nation, Ireland was granted Full Member (and hence Test) status for the men's national side. Ireland played their first men's Test match against Pakistan in May 2018, losing by 5 wickets. Ireland's women played a Test match prior to full membership. This was in 2000, against the Pakistan women's team.

== History ==
=== Early history ===
Cricket has been played in Ireland since at least the 17th century, when Oliver Cromwell issued an edict banning it. It is believed to have been introduced to Ireland by the British. However, recent research claims that Irish troops in the British Army shaped the game's evolution by introducing terms and gameplay from the old Irish game of Catty. The earliest known reference to a match in Ireland is the August 1792 fixture in Dublin between the British garrison and an "All-Ireland" team, the garrison team winning by an innings.

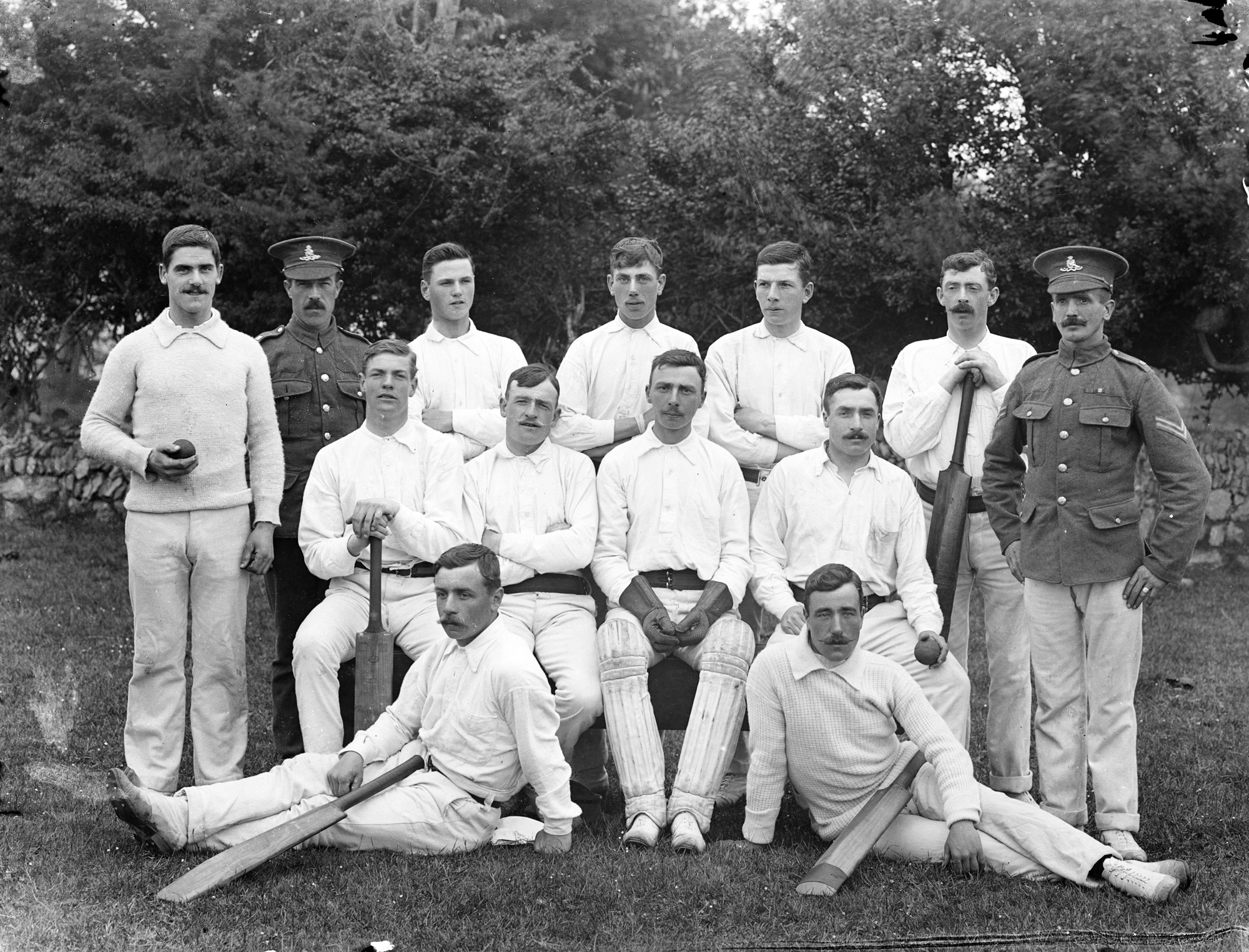
Irishmen who were British soldiers, probably of the Royal Artillery, in cricket gear, Waterford, May 1909

Cricket was being played in the towns of Kilkenny and Ballinasloe in the early 19th century, with the Ballinasloe club established in 1825. In the 1830s, the game began to decline; although many of the clubs founded in the following 30 years are still in existence today. The first Irish national team played in 1855 against an English national team in Dublin. In the 1850s, the Englishman Charles Lawrence was responsible for developing the game in Ireland through his coaching. In the 1850s and 1860s, Ireland was visited for the first time by touring professional teams. Ireland's first match against Marylebone Cricket Club was in 1858. The game grew in popularity until the early 1880s.

Two changes in the late 19th and early 20th centuries damaged the popularity of cricket. The first was the outbreak of the Land War in the late 1800s, resulting from the mistreatment of tenants by absentee landlords. The second was a ban placed in 1901 on the playing of "foreign" games by the Gaelic Athletic Association, which was not lifted until 1970. Anyone playing foreign games, such as cricket, would be banned from the extremely popular Irish games of hurling and Gaelic football, as it was popularly referred to as a 'garrison game' enjoyed primarily by the occupying British forces and the landowning Protestant oligarchy they protected.

Irish teams toured Canada and the United States in 1879, 1888, 1892, and 1909. On top of this, Ireland defeated a touring South African side in 1904. Their first match with first-class status was played on 19 May 1902 against a London County side including W.G. Grace. The Irish, captained by Sir Tim O'Brien, lost convincingly by 238 runs.

=== Modern era ===
The 2005 ICC Trophy was hosted by Ireland. After Ireland's successes at the 2007 Cricket World Cup, cricket experienced a popularity boom in Ireland, with participation reaching record levels.

== Participation ==
According to the Cricket Ireland strategic plan for 2021–2023, 52,000 people in Ireland play, officiate or administer cricket or are involved in school programmes. This is compared to 13,000 people in 2007.

There are more than 120 active cricket clubs on the island. Women and girls make up 19% of participation numbers. Immigration to Ireland has boosted participation, with 70% of people involved through the Leinster Cricket Union being of non-Irish origin.

27,000 children participated in school programs in 2019.

== Administration ==
The Irish Cricket Union (ICU) – the governing body of Irish cricket – was officially founded in 1923, although its predecessor had been active since 1890.

In 2007, it announced major structural changes to bring it in-line with the main cricket governing bodies.

In 2008, the Irish Cricket Union was formally dissolved and replaced with Irish Cricket Union Limited, which would use the trading name of Cricket Ireland. A new governance structure was implemented, with the Board of Directors comprising a chair, six nominees from four Provincial Unions and five independent directors. All Board members are non-executive and act in a voluntary capacity.

Warren Deutrom has served as CEO since 2006.

== National Teams ==
=== Men's National Team ===
The Ireland cricket team is the cricket team representing all Ireland (i.e., both the Republic of Ireland and Northern Ireland). They compete in Test, One Day International and T20I competitions in international cricket. Ireland was granted ODI status after finishing second in the 2005 ICC Trophy, while also qualifying for the 2007 Cricket World Cup, the first time they had done so. They were awarded Test status in 2017.

==== Difficulty with player retention ====
In the period before and after obtaining ODI status, Ireland lost a number of their most talented players to England. This was due to Ireland's lack of professional wages and an inability to play Test cricket. Since gaining Full Member status, no senior player has left to play elsewhere internationally.

Dublin-born batsman Ed Joyce had played with some success as part of Ireland's ICC Trophy team and became a key member of the Sussex side in England's County Championship; he also previously captained Middlesex in the 2004 season. Joyce decided to declare for England in 2005 in order to try to play Test cricket, he was called up in 2006 and made his ODI debut against Ireland. Joyce never played a Test for England and returned to play for Ireland in 2011. He retired in 2018 and is now Head Coach of the Ireland Women's team.

Talented batsman Eoin Morgan, who earlier represented Ireland in tournaments, including the ICC World Cup and the ICC World Twenty20, qualified and played for England, making no secret of his desire to play Test cricket. He played 16 Tests for England and captained the ODI team to victory in the 2019 Cricket World Cup.

Former Ireland seamer Boyd Rankin also joined England in 2013 before returning to play for Ireland until retiring in 2021.

After the World Cup, Irish cricket experienced a dip in success with poor results in the 2007 Friends Provident Trophy as many players were unavailable. The Irish cricket team was an amateur side at the time and most of the players had full-time jobs with commitments conflicting with cricket. After the World Cup there were delays in paying the players which resulted in them ignoring the press in protest of their treatment after an Intercontinental Cup match against Kenya.

Warren Deutrom, the chief executive of the ICU, had stated that it wanted to "seek actively to place Irish players into top-level cricket, by developing relationships with [especially] county cricket which will incorporate appropriate player release for Irish international duty, and feeder systems for developing Irish cricketers". The reorganised ICU has sought closer links with the English counties, to encourage the development of age group cricket, and to introduce a professional element in Ireland. They also want to take the Irish cricket team on winter tours more often. In an attempt to prevent the game losing players to counties or other commitments such as jobs, it was suggested that central contracts should be introduced.

==== English county competition ====
Ireland, along with Scotland, has, at times, played in competitions for English county cricket sides, including the Benson & Hedges Cup and the Friends Provident Trophy (previously the C&G Trophy). Since there is no nationality restriction in county cricket, non-Irish players have competed for Ireland in these matches. For example, Hansie Cronje of South Africa competed for Ireland in the 1997 Benson & Hedges Cup, and more recently New Zealander Jesse Ryder played for Ireland in 2007. In 2004 Ireland beat Surrey by five wickets in the C&G Trophy.

For the 2006 season, the C&G Trophy was reorganised to include a round-robin stage instead of being entirely knock-out. Whereas Ireland had only one match guaranteed in the tournament before, they now had more fixtures against English county sides. For the 2006 tournament, they were bolstered by the signings of Saqlain Mushtaq and Shahid Afridi, the two overseas players they were allowed when competing in English domestic competitions. Ireland recorded one win in their nine matches. Their victory was over Gloucestershire on 30 April by 47 runs.

The C&G Trophy changed its name to Friends Provident Trophy for the 2007 season. In 2007, Ireland played against nine English county sides. Of those nine matches, they lost six and the remaining three matches were abandoned due to rain. They finished bottom in the South Conference of the trophy. For the 2008 season, the round-robin section of the trophy was changed from two divisions to three; Ireland was in the newly formed Midlands Division. In 2008, Ireland played eight games in the Midlands Division, winning one match, with one no result and six losses. They finished last in the division of five teams. Ireland's four wicket victory over Warwickshire on 16 May was Ireland's first win in the competition against a county side for two years. Captain William Porterfield anchored the innings with 69 runs.

== Domestic cricket ==
=== Inter-Provincial Series ===
The Inter-Provincial Series ('Interpros') was introduced in 2013 as part of Cricket Ireland's strategy to attain Test status by 2020. It featured three teams representing their respective provincial unions: Leinster Lightning, North West Warriors, Northern Knights. Munster Reds were added to the T20 competition in 2017 and then the List A competition in 2021. Connacht Cricket Union do not take any part in these competitions.

==== First-Class ====
The multi-day competition is called the Inter-Provincial Championship. In October 2016, the International Cricket Council agreed to award the competition first-class status as part of efforts to elevate Ireland to becoming a Full Member. The competition was not held in 2020, due to the Coronavirus pandemic and has yet to return. Leinster Lightning have been the most successful team in the competition, winning six of the seven seasons.

Since the suspension of the Inter-Provincial Championship after the 2019 season, the only domestic first-class cricket in Ireland has been the Emerald Challenge match, contested in 2024 and 2026 between the Strikers (from Northern Ireland) and the Raiders (from the Republic of Ireland).

==== List A ====
The one-day competition is called the Inter-Provincial Cup. At the same time that the ICC awarded first-class status to the Inter-Provincial Championship, List A status was also conferred on the Inter-Provincial Cup. Leinster Lightning have been the most successful team in the competition, winning eight of the ten seasons.

==== Twenty20 ====
The 20 over competition is called the Inter-Provincial Trophy. The competition also received official Twenty20 status in October 2016. Leinster Lightning have been the most successful team in the competition, winning seven of the ten seasons.

==== Contracts and Eligibility ====
In a Cricket Ireland press release, High Performance Director Richard Holdsworth explained the process for the provinces to award contracts for the Interpros. He said that each team would be allowed to award sixteen contracts. These contracts would not involve regular salaries for reasons of budget, but they would include match fees and help with expenses such as travel and gym memberships.

To be eligible for a contract, a player must either be an Irish national or play for an Irish club in one of the five cricketing provinces. Holdsworth said that the Interpros should provide a direct pathway into the Ireland side, but that retired internationals like Nigel Jones and Albert van der Merwe would still be eligible. Teams are allowed to play up to two non-Irish nationals in the Championship matches.

Each province would first have the opportunity to sign players from their own province, but players would also be able to play for non-local provinces if they preferred to do so. He also said that provinces would be allowed to bring in players from outside their squads who are excelling in club cricket.

=== Club cricket ===
Club cricket is organised on a provincial basis, with each of four major provinces – Leinster, Munster, Northern and North West – organising its own senior leagues and cups.

Clubs within the Connacht Cricket Union, the smallest and newest provincial union, generally compete in Munster Union competition.

==== Irish Senior Cup ====
Since 1982, Cricket Ireland has organised the 50-over Irish Senior Cup on an all-Ireland basis. The competition has held a similar format since its inception – featuring 32 teams: ten clubs from each of Leinster, the North and North West, and two from Munster, producing a five-round knockout. At times entries have exceeded 32 teams, requiring the need for preliminary games.

Waringstown are the most successful team in the competition's history win six titles. CIYMS are the current holders, they beat Lisburn in the 2022 final.

==== All-Ireland T20 Cup ====
The All-Ireland T20 Cup is the national club T20 competition in Ireland, bringing together the best T20 teams in club cricket across the provinces.

The men's competition began in 2017 and features the winner of each of the four Provincial Unions' T20 club competition playing off in four team knockout format. The semi-finals and the final are played on the same day. CIYMS are the current holders of the Cup, having beaten Cork Harlequins in the 2022 final.

The women's tournament began in 2021 and features a preliminary final between the winner of the NCU's and NWCU's T20 club competition to play in the final against the winner of Leinster's T20 club competition. Merrion beat CIYMS in the 2022 final and are the current holders of the Cup.

=== Trans-national ===
In 2019, Cricket Ireland, Cricket Scotland and the Royal Dutch Cricket Association announced the creation of a Twenty20 league competition, the Euro T20 Slam, involving two new city-based franchises per nation. In April of that year, it was confirmed that the as yet unnamed Irish franchises would be based in Dublin and Belfast.

The first season of the Twenty20 franchise-based league was scheduled to start in August 2019 but was postponed due to unforeseen reasons. Cricket Ireland again announced postponement of the competition in 2021.

== International cricket grounds ==
There are four international cricket venues in Ireland that have been approved by the International Cricket Council to host international cricket.

Ground	Club	City	Provincial Union	Capacity	First Used	Test	ODI	T20I
Castle Avenue	Clontarf Cricket Club	Dublin	Leinster Cricket Union	3,200	1999	—	25	3
Stormont	C.S.N.I.	Belfast	Northern Cricket Union	7,000	2006	—	34	27
The Village	Malahide Cricket Club	Malahide	Leinster Cricket Union	11,500	2013	1	22	16
Bready	Bready Cricket Club	Magheramason	North West Cricket Union	3,000	2015	—	1	12

Cricket Ireland is also committed to the creation of a fifth international ground in Abbotstown, West Dublin. In January 2023, Cricket Ireland was given the go ahead by Minister for Sport Catherine Martin to proceed with development in Abbotstown on the Sport Ireland campus. CEO Warren Deutrom said he expected work on pitches to begin in 2023 in order to be ready to co-host the 2030 T20 World Cup alongside England and Scotland.

There is currently no international ground in either of the Munster or Connacht Cricket Union areas.

== See also ==
- Sport in Ireland
- Cricket in England

== Bibliography ==
- Bowen, Rowland (1970). Cricket: A History of its Growth and Development. Eyre & Spottiswoode.
