= Roy Stevens (cricketer) =

English cricketer and Royal Marines officer

Personal information
- Full name: Roy Gilbert Stevens
- Born: 6 February 1933; Walmer, Kent, England
- Died: 6 October 1992 (aged 59); Ipswich, Suffolk, England

Domestic team information
- Years: Team
- 1962: Combined Services
- 1962: Devon

Career statistics
Competition	First-class
Matches	1
Runs scored	38
Batting average	19.00
100s/50s	–/–
Top score	29
Balls bowled	96
Wickets	2
Bowling average	23.50
5 wickets in innings	–
10 wickets in match	–
Best bowling	1/23
Catches/stumpings	2/–
- Source: Cricinfo, 14 March 2011

Roy Gilbert Stevens (6 February 1933 – 6 October 1992) was an English cricketer and Royal Marines officer who became a prominent cricket administrator after leaving the forces. Stevens was born in Walmer, Kent and died at Ipswich, Suffolk.

== Cricketer ==
As a Royal Marine, Stevens played cricket as a left-handed lower-order batsman and bowler for the Royal Navy, first representing the team in non-first-class inter-services matches in 1952. His only first-class appearance was for the Combined Services in 1962, against Ireland. In the first innings he scored 29 runs before being dismissed by Noel Ferguson and in the second-innings he scored 9 runs before being dismissed by Archie McQuilken. With the ball he took the wicket of Thomas McCloy in the Irish first innings and in the second he took the wicket of Archie McQuilken, the two wickets coming at a combined cost of 47 runs. In August 1962 he played two Minor Counties Championship matches for Devon, both against the Somerset Second XI.

== Career ==
In his 1952 appearance for the Royal Navy, Stevens is recorded by Wisden Cricketers' Almanack as a lance-corporal in the Royal Marines. In 1955, he was commissioned as a second lieutenant in the marines. He was promoted to full lieutenant in 1957. There was a further promotion to the rank of local captain in 1963, and he became a full captain in 1965. He retired from the marines at his own request with the rank of captain in 1973.

After he left the Royal Marines in 1973, Stevens became secretary of Somerset between 1975 and 1979 and moved on to the same role at Sussex from 1980 to 1983. In its obituary of him in the 1993 edition, Wisden wrote: "He cut a slightly old-fashioned figure at a time when clubs were starting to appoint marketing-oriented men rather than ex-officers as administrators."
