= Arthur Walker (Irish cricketer) =

Irish cricketer

Personal information
- Full name: Arthur Walton Walker
- Born: 10 September 1891; Dublin, Ireland
- Died: 13 January 1968 (aged 76); Bangor, Northern Ireland
- Batting: Right-handed
- Bowling: Right-arm fast-medium

Domestic team information
- Years: Team
- 1913: Ireland

Career statistics
Competition	First-class
Matches	1
Runs scored	3
Batting average	3.00
100s/50s	–/–
Top score	3
Balls bowled	0
Wickets	–
Bowling average	–
5 wickets in innings	–
10 wickets in match	–
Best bowling	–
Catches/stumpings	–/–
- Source: Cricinfo, 4 November 2018

Arthur Walton Walker (10 September 1891 – 13 January 1968) was an Irish first-class cricketer.

Walker was born at Belfast in September 1891. The son of a Queen's University music professor, Walker was educated at the Royal Belfast Academical Institution, before going up to Queen's University. He played his club cricket in Belfast for Cliftonville and Queen's University Cricket Club, before moving to Dublin in 1913 to study at Trinity College. Playing his club cricket in Dublin for Dublin University Cricket Club, Walker found himself called into the Ireland team in 1913 for their annual first-class match against Scotland, played at Edinburgh. Despite being a bowler, he did not bowl in the match, and in his one batting innings he was dismissed for 3 runs by Donald McDonald. He did not feature for Ireland after this match. Walker died at Bangor in January 1968.
