= NCU Junior Cup =

Provincial cricket competition on the island of Ireland

The NCU Junior Cup is a provincial cricket knock-out cup of the NCU jurisdiction in Ireland. The competition began in 1891 and is open to teams playing in the Sections 2 and 3 of the NCU Senior League and Section 1 of the NCU Junior League (which is made up of 2nd XI teams of senior clubs). It is sponsored by Goldblatt McGuigan.

Matches consist of one innings per side, with fifty overs bowled per innings. Where matches are interrupted or delayed because of weather, the number of overs may be reduced to a minimum of 20.

== List of winners ==
Source: CricketEurope Ireland Archives

| Season | Winners |
|---|---|
| 1891 | Lavinia |
| 1892 | Ulidia |
| 1893 | Enfield |
| 1894 | North Down II |
| 1895 | Enfield |
| 1896 | Ligoniel |
| 1897 | North Down II |
| 1898 | North of Ireland II |
| 1899 | Enfield |
| 1900 | North of Ireland II |
| 1901 | North of Ireland II |
| 1902 | North Down II |
| 1903 | Lisburn II |
| 1904 | North Down II |
| 1905 | North of Ireland II |
| 1906 | Ballymena |
| 1907 | North of Ireland II |
| 1908 | Sydenham |
| 1909 | Woodvale |
| 1910 | Enfield |
| 1911 | Ulidia |
| 1912 | Enfield |
| 1913 | North of Ireland II |
| 1914 | Enfield |
| 1915-18 | no competition |
| 1919 | Oakleigh |
| 1920 | Enfield |
| 1921 | North of Ireland II |
| 1922 | Donaghcloney |
| 1923 | Muckamore |
| 1924 | Shrigley |
| 1925 | Muckamore |
| 1926 | North Down II |
| 1927 | Shrigley |
| 1928 | Shrigley |
| 1929 | Milford |
| 1930 | Enfield |
| 1931 | Muckamore |
| 1932 | Sirocco Works |
| 1933 | Lisburn II |
| 1934 | Cregagh II |
| 1935 | Ballymena |
| 1936 | Cregagh |
| 1937 | North of Ireland II |
| 1938 | Laurelvale |
| 1939 | Ballymena |
| 1940-45 | no competition |
| 1946 | St Mary’s |
| 1947 | Lisburn II |
| 1948 | Donaghcloney |
| 1949 | North of Ireland II |
| 1950 | Drumaness and Muckamore (shared) |
| 1951 | Woodvale II |
| 1952 | Drumaness |
| 1953 | Ulidia |
| 1954 | Downpatrick II |
| 1955 | Woodvale II |
| 1956 | Cliftonville II and North of Ireland II (shared) |
| 1957 | North of Ireland II |
| 1958 | Lisburn II |
| 1959 | Lisburn II |
| 1960 | Woodvale II |
| 1961 | Cliftonville II |
| 1962 | Woodvale II |
| 1963 | Civil Service |
| 1964 | Lisburn II |
| 1965 | Laurelvale |
| 1966 | Laurelvale |
| 1967 | Instonians II |
| 1968 | C.I.Y.M.S. |
| 1969 | Dunmurry |
| 1970 | Instonians II |
| 1971 | Short Brothers & Harland |
| 1972 | North of Ireland II |
| 1973 | Downpatrick II |
| 1974 | Downpatrick II |
| 1975 | Downpatrick II |
| 1976 | Woodvale II |
| 1977 | Dunmurry |
| 1978 | Dunmurry |
| 1979 | North of Ireland II |
| 1980 | Woodvale II |
| 1981 | North Down II |
| 1982 | Woodvale II |
| 1983 | Bangor and Muckamore II (shared) |
| 1984 | Ballymena II |
| 1985 | Dunmurry |
| 1986 | North Down II |
| 1987 | Muckamore II |
| 1988 | Drumaness |
| 1989 | Woodvale II |
| 1990 | Bangor II |
| 1991 | C.I.Y.M.S. |
| 1992 | Lisburn II |
| 1993 | Woodvale II |
| 1994 | North of Ireland II |
| 1995 | Woodvale II |
| 1996 | North of Ireland II |
| 1997 | Waringstown II |
| 1998 | Muckamore II |
| 1999 | Bangor II and Millpark (shared) |
| 2000 | R.U.C. |
| 2001 | Instonians II |
| 2002 | Waringstown II |
| 2003 | Saintfield |
| 2004 | Bangor II |
| 2005 | Academy |
| 2006 | North Down II |
| 2007 | Lurgan II |
| 2008 | Academy |
| 2009 | Academy |
| 2010 | Academy |
| 2011 | Cooke Collegians |
| 2012 | Cooke Collegians |
| 2013 | North Down II |
| 2014 | Academy |
| 2015 | Armagh |
| 2016 | Lisburn II |
| 2017 | Instonians II |
| 2018 | Templepatrick |
| 2019 | North Down II |
| 2020 | not played |
| 2021 | Laurelvale |
| 2022 | CSNI II |
| 2023 | Lurgan |
| 2024 | Waringstown II |
| 2025 | Cooke Collegians |
| 2026 | Lisburn II |

== Summary of winners ==
| Team | Wins |
|---|---|
| North of Ireland II | 15 (1 shared) |
| Woodvale | 11* |
| North Down II | 10 |
| Lisburn II | 9 |
| Enfield/Cliftonville II | 9 (1 shared) |
| Muckamore | 7 (2 shared)** |
| Academy | 5 |
| Ballymena | †4 |
| Downpatrick II | 4 |
| Dunmurry | 4 |
| Instonians II | 4 |
| Bangor II | 4 (2 shared) |
| Cooke Collegians | 3 |
| Shrigley | 3 |
| Ulidia | 3 |
| Waringstown II | 3 |
| Drumaness | 3 (1 shared) |
| C.I.Y.M.S. | 2 |
| CSNI II | 2 |
| Cregagh | ††2 |
| Donaghcloney | 2 |
| Lurgan Cricket Club | 2 |
| Armagh | 1 |
| Civil Service | 1 |
| Laurelvale | 1 |
| Lavinia | 1 |
| Ligoniel | 1 |
| Milford | 1 |
| Millpark | 1 |
| Oakleigh | 1 |
| R.U.C. | 1 |
| St Mary’s | 1 |
| Saintfield | 1 |
| Short Brothers & Harland | 1 |
| Sirocco Works | 1 |
| Sydenham | 1 |
| Templepatrick | 1 |

* 11 by 2nd XI
** 3 (1 shared) by 2nd XI
† 1 by 2nd XI
†† 1 by 2nd XI

== See also ==
- NCU Senior League
- NCU Senior Cup
- Ulster Cup
