= Paul Moore (cricketer) =

Irish cricketer

Personal information
- Full name: Paul David Moore
- Born: 10 June 1961 (age 65); Bangor, Northern Ireland
- Batting: Right-handed
- Role: Wicket-keeper

Domestic team information
- Years: Team
- 1992: Ireland

Career statistics
Competition	First-class
Matches	1
Runs scored	0
Batting average	–
100s/50s	0/0
Top score	0*
Catches/stumpings	2/0
- Source: Cricinfo, 27 October 2018

Paul David Moore (born 10 June 1961) is a former Irish first-class cricketer.

Moore was born at Bangor in County Down in June 1961, and was educated at Sullivan Upper School. A wicket-keeper at club level for Holywood and North Down, he played one first-class cricket match for Ireland against Scotland at Dundee in 1992. In a drawn match, Moore batted once, ending Ireland's first-innings of 280 unbeaten without scoring. He also took two catches behind the stumps in Scotland's first-innings. He later played for Ireland in a minor match against the Marylebone Cricket Club in 1994. Outside of cricket, Moore works as an architect.
