= McCrum =

McCrum is a surname. Notable people with the surname include:

- Charles McCrum (born 1964), Irish cricketer
- Michael McCrum (1924–2005), English academic and historian
- Paul McCrum (born 1962), Irish cricketer
- Robert McCrum (born 1953), English writer and editor
- William McCrum (1865–1932), Irish linen manufacturer and footballer
- John Conal McCrum (born 1952), English doctor and school governor
- Mark McCrum (born 1958), English Author
