= Jack Simpson (cricketer) =

Irish cricketer

Personal information
- Full name: Jack Simpson
- Born: 1 December 1920; Lisburn, Ireland
- Died: 13 January 1997 (aged 76); Lisburn, Northern Ireland
- Batting: Right-handed
- Bowling: Right-arm fast-medium

Domestic team information
- Years: Team
- 1954: Ireland

Career statistics
| Competition | First-class |
|---|---|
| Matches | 1 |
| Runs scored | 26 |
| Batting average | 26.00 |
| 100s/50s | –/– |
| Top score | 26 |
| Balls bowled | 90 |
| Wickets | 0 |
| Bowling average | – |
| 5 wickets in innings | – |
| 10 wickets in match | – |
| Best bowling | – |
| Catches/stumpings | –/– |
- Source: Cricinfo, 28 October 2018

Jack Simpson (1 December 1920 – 13 January 1997) was a Northern Irish first-class cricketer.

Simpson was born in Lisburn and was educated in the town at Wallace High School and Lisburn Technical College. Playing his club cricket for Lisburn, Simpson made a single appearance in first-class cricket for Ireland against Scotland at Paisley in 1954. He batted once in the match, scoring 26 runs in Ireland's first-innings, before being dismissed by Jimmy Allan. He also bowled fifteen wicket-less overs across Scotland's two innings. He died at Lisburn in January 1997.
