= Archie McQuilken =

Irish cricketer

Personal information
- Full name: Archibald Lynn McQuilken
- Born: 30 September 1933; Muckamore, Northern Ireland
- Died: 16 October 1985 (aged 52); Belfast, Northern Ireland
- Batting: Right-handed
- Bowling: Leg break googly

Domestic team information
- Years: Team
- 1962: Ireland

Career statistics
Competition	First-class
Matches	2
Runs scored	140
Batting average	35.00
100s/50s	0/0
Top score	42
Balls bowled	115
Wickets	5
Bowling average	12.00
5 wickets in innings	1
10 wickets in match	0
Best bowling	5/37
Catches/stumpings	0/–
- Source: Cricinfo, 17 October 2018

Archibald Lynn McQuilken (30 September 1933 – 16 October 1985) was an Irish first-class cricketer.

McQuilken was born at Muckamore in County Antrim in September 1933. An all-rounder for Muckamore Cricket Club, for whom he scored over 10,000 runs and took over a 1,000 wickets, he played two first-class cricket matches for Ireland 1962. His first came against the Combined Services at Belfast, while his second match came against Scotland at Greenock. He took a five-wicket haul on debut, with 5/37; these were his only first-class wickets. He also scored 140 runs across both matches, with a highest score of 42. Outside of cricket his profession was an engineer. He died in a road traffic accident in Belfast in June 1985.
