= Ballygomartin Road =

Cricket ground in Belfast, Northern Ireland

Coordinates: 54°36′36.62″N 5°57′57.89″W

- Interactive map of Ballygomartin Road

Ground information
- Location: Belfast, Northern Ireland
- Country: United Kingdom

Team information
Woodvale

Ballygomartin Road is a cricket ground in the Greater Shankill area of Belfast, Northern Ireland and the home of Woodvale Cricket Club. The ground has hosted a single List-A match which saw Canada play Namibia in the 2005 ICC Trophy.
