= Middle Road, Carrickfergus =

Cricket ground in Carrickfergus, Northern Ireland

Coordinates: 54.73457°N 5.82887°W

Carrickfergus Cricket Club Ground, Middle Road, Carrickfergus
Ground information
- Location: Carrickfergus, Northern Ireland
- Establishment: 1868
- End names
- Woodburn End; Milebush End or Robin Beggs End

Team information
Carrickfergus Cricket Club
- As of 9 September 2010; Source: Ground profile

Carrickfergus Cricket Club Ground is a cricket ground at Middle Road in Carrickfergus, Northern Ireland. It is the home of Carrickfergus Cricket Club. The Carrickfergus club moved to the ground in 1984

The ground has hosted a single List-A match which saw the Netherlands play Oman in the 2005 ICC Trophy.

In local domestic cricket, the ground is the home of Carrickfergus Cricket Club, which was established in 1868.
