= Ulster Cricket Club =

Former sports organisation in Northern Ireland

Ulster
Team information
- Founded: 1873
- Dissolved: 1931
- Home ground: Prospect 1874-79; Ulster Cricket Ground1879-1931

The Ulster Cricket Club was an Irish cricket club based in Ballynafeigh, Belfast. Formed in 1873, it was one of the leading Irish cricket clubs in the Victorian period, but went out of existence in 1931. The Ulster Football Club was formed by its members in 1877.

== Honours ==
- NCU Senior League: 1
  - 1922
- NCU Challenge Cup: 4
  - 1895, 1909, 1911, 1930
- NCU Junior Cup: †2
  - †1892, †1911

† Won by 2nd XI (Ulidia)

== See also ==
- Ulster F.C.
