= Sonny Hool =

Cricket information
- Batting: Right-handed
- Bowling: Left-arm orthodox spin

International information
- National side: Ireland

Career statistics
Competition	First-class
Matches	9
Runs scored	132
Batting average	16.50
100s/50s	0/0
Top score	27
Balls bowled	1,261
Wickets	18
Bowling average	33.38
5 wickets in innings	1
10 wickets in match	0
Best bowling	5/73
Catches/stumpings	4/–
- Source: CricketArchive, 16 November 2022

Nathan Bernard "Sonny" Hool (28 January 1924 – 10 October 1988) was an Irish cricketer. A right-handed batsman and Left-arm orthodox spin bowler, he played fourteen times for the Ireland cricket team between 1947 and 1961, including nine first-class matches.

== Playing career ==
Hool made his debut for Ireland against Scotland in May 1947 in a first-class match. Whilst it was an unsuccessful match with the bat, scoring a duck in each innings, he was successful with the ball in the Scottish second innings, taking 5/73 with his left-arm spin. He continued the year with matches against Yorkshire, the Craven Gentlemen and Derbyshire before a match at Lord's against the MCC where he took 5/19 in the only MCC innings, his best bowling figures for Ireland.

He played just four times over the following three years, against Scotland and the MCC in 1948, against Yorkshire in July 1949 and against Nottinghamshire in July 1950 before spending four years out of the Ireland team. He returned with a first-class match against Scotland in July 1954 and a match against the MCC in September, during which he scored 27 in the first innings, his highest score for Ireland.

He played just three more times for Ireland, against Scotland in June 1956, against the Free Foresters in August 1957 and against Leicestershire in May 1961.

== Statistics ==
In all matches for Ireland, he scored 189 runs at an average of 15.75 and took 27 wickets at an average of 31.26. He took five wickets in an innings twice. In first-class cricket, he scored 132 runs at an average of 16.50 and took 18 wickets at an average of 33.38, taking five wickets in an innings once.
