= Holywood Cricket Club 1881 =

Holywood Cricket Club 1881 (Holywood Hawks)
- League: Northern Cricket Union Senior League

Team information
- City: Holywood, Northern Ireland
- Colours: Lime green, black
- Established: 1881
- Home ground: Seapark Oval

Holywood Cricket Club 1881 is a cricket club in Holywood, County Down, Northern Ireland, playing in the Northern Cricket Union's (NCU) Senior League 2.

== History ==
The club was founded in 1881, originally playing at Kinnegar in Holywood. However, after an 1885 storm blew the pavilion away, the club found a new home at Belfast Road, where it remained until 1996 before moving to Seapark Oval. During the First World War, Holywood's ladies section held a tableau vivant cricket match and concert at the King Edward VII Memorial Hall and raised £10 (£1212 in 2023) to buy cigarettes for the Norfolk Regiment that had been initially based in the village at the start of the war.

In 1997, Holywood faced difficulties due to the raising of St Paul's Gaelic Athletic Club on its adjacent pitch, which was used by the cricket club as its outfield. For the 1997 season, the club moved to Sullivan Upper School. This arrangement lasted for 8 seasons until the club moved to the Seapark Oval. The teams are known as the 'Holywood Hawks'. In 2022, Holywood received a grant from SportNI to promote engagement in sport. They play in the Northern Cricket Union Senior League 2.

== Alumni ==
Notable former Holywood players have included Conn McCall and Stewart McCormick. International wicketkeepers who learned the game at Holywood are Paul Moore and Gary Wilson. On the administration side, Holywood has produced NCU presidents such as R.M. Erskine and Dawson Moreland. Cecil Cave was president of the Irish Cricket Union, now Cricket Ireland, in 1976.

== Gallery ==
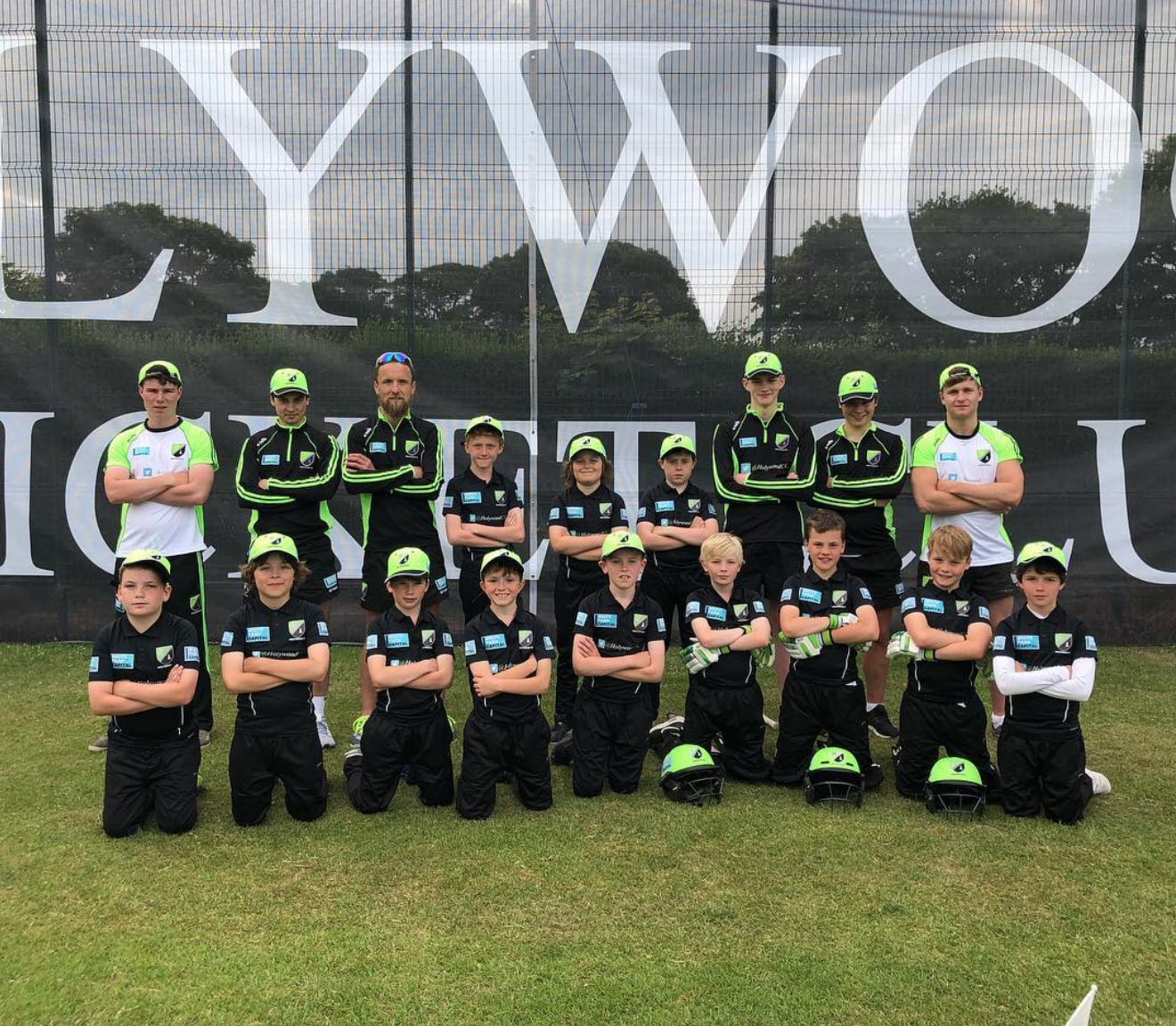
Holywood u11s

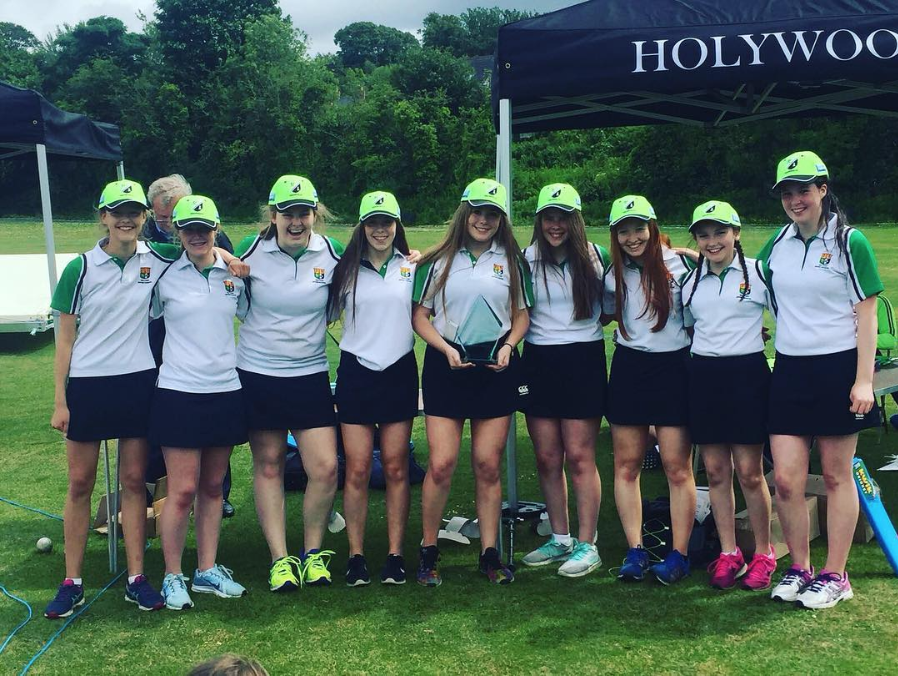
2018

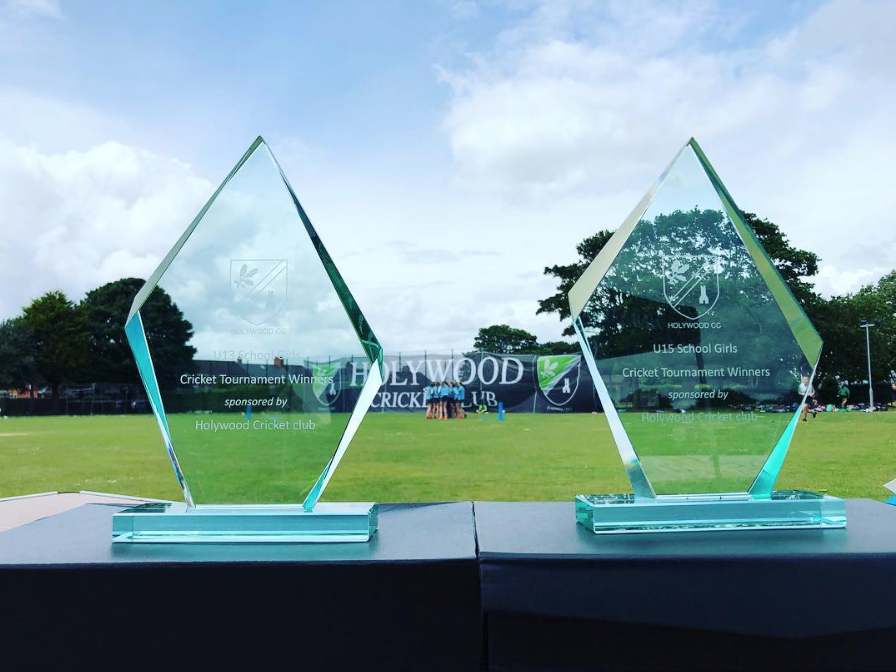
Schoolgirls tournament trophies

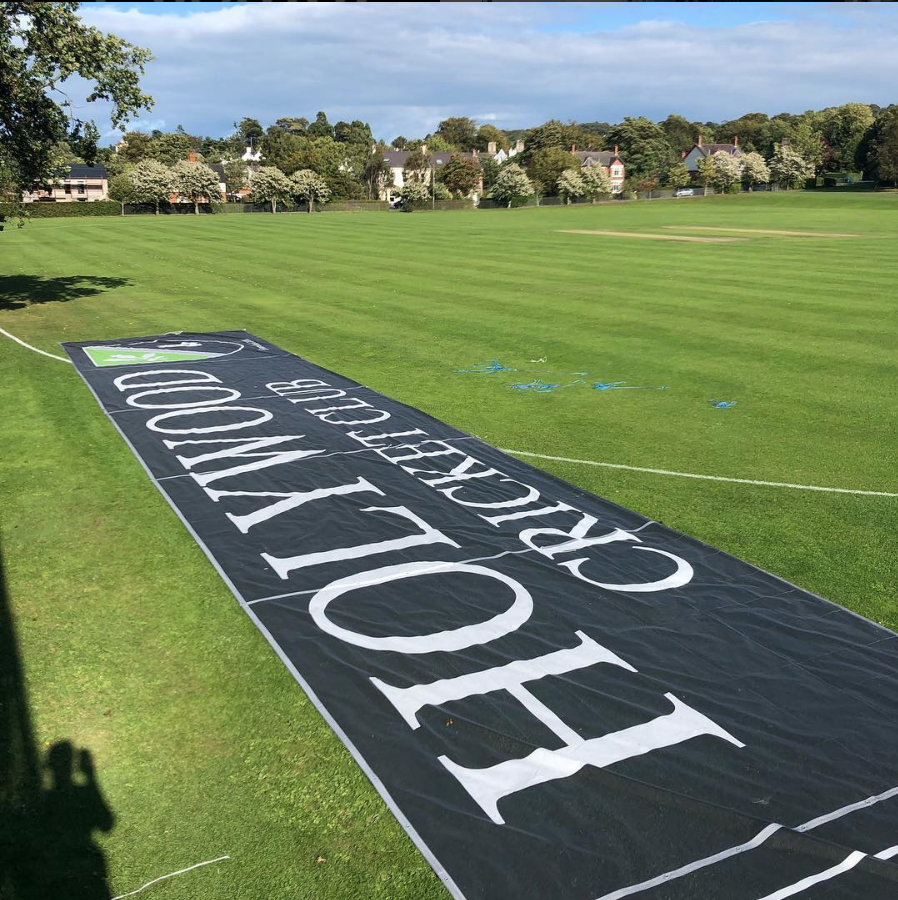
Seapark Oval

== Honours ==
- NCU Senior League: 6 (1 shared)
  - 1901, 1909, 1912, 1914, 1956, 1958 (shared)
- NCU Challenge Cup: 2
  - 1899, 1905
