= Millpark Cricket Club =

Millpark
Team information
- Dissolved: 2017 (merger with Donacloney Cricket Club)
- Home ground: Banford Green

Millpark Cricket Club was a cricket club in Gilford, County Down, Northern Ireland, that last played in Section 2 of the NCU Senior League. The club, originally based at Millpark, an area located between Gilford and Banbridge, moved the short distance to its second and final home Banford Green, in 1969. In 2017, the club merged with Donaghcloney Cricket Club under the name Donaghcloney Mill Cricket Club.

== History ==
Having spent most of its years in the lower leagues, Millpark's golden era was in the late 1990s and early 2000s when Irish Internationals, David Dennison, and brothers Alan and Noel Nelson returned to their boyhood club from near neighbours Waringstown CC. These years saw the club win NCU Section 4 (undefeated in the league), gain promotion again the following year, and share the NCU Junior Cup in 1999.

Following the retirement of the three internationals, Millpark consolidated for some years in the third tier of the NCU, before slipping back to the bottom league.

Recruiting players was an increasing problem, and in 2015 the decision was taken to fold the second team. In 2017 it was accepted that the club would be unable to continue in its current state. After assessing a number of options available in the local area, the decision was made to approach their nearest neighbours, Donacloney Cricket Club, who accepted a proposed merger.

== Honours ==
- NCU Junior Cup: 1 (shared)
  - 1999 (shared)
