= Derek Heasley =

Irish cricketer (born 1972)

Personal information
- Born: 15 January 1972 (age 54); Lisburn, Northern Ireland
- Batting: Right-handed
- Bowling: Right-arm medium

Domestic team information
- Years: Team
- 1996–2002: Ireland

Career statistics
Competition	List A
Matches	21
Runs scored	305
Batting average	17.94
100s/50s	0/1
Top score	66*
Balls bowled	800
Wickets	24
Bowling average	29.25
5 wickets in innings	0
10 wickets in match	0
Best bowling	4/66
Catches/stumpings	8/–
- Source: Cricinfo, 27 October 2021

Derek Heasley (born 15 January 1972) is an Irish cricketer. He is a right-handed batsman and right arm medium pace bowler. He made his debut for Ireland against Surrey on 14 May 1996 and has played for them 60 times in all, including two ICC Trophy tournaments in 1997 and 2001. He also represented Northern Ireland in the cricket tournament of the 1998 Commonwealth Games.
