= Templepatrick Cricket Club =

Templepatrick

Team information
- Colors: Red and Black
- Founded: 1969
- Home ground: The Cloughan
- Official website: templepatrickcc.com

Templepatrick Cricket Club is a cricket club in Ballyclare, County Antrim, Northern Ireland, playing in Section 1 of the NCU Senior League.

The club was founded in 1969. The club joined the Northern Cricket Union in 1976.

== On field progress ==
The club was founded in 1969 and played for two years in the Boys' Brigade 20 Overs Evening Cricket League before gaining admittance to the now defunct Belfast Cricket League in 1971. After using Belfast City Council owned pitches for their entire history, Templepatrick found a permanent home of its own in 1996 when they were invited to join up with Ballyclare Rugby Club at Cloughan Lane in Ballyclare.

For many years, Templepatrick played in the bottom rung of Northern Cricket Union senior cricket before finally gaining promotion in 2003.

== Ground development and coaching ==
The club is noted for its efforts in youth cricket and coaching, achieving accreditation through the Clubmark NI programme of Sport Northern Ireland. The leader of the coaching team, Andy McCrea, was awarded the Outstanding Coaching Award at the ECB Sky Sports Coach Awards 2011. Their efforts in coaching have been matched by major ground improvements, laying a new cricket square at their Cloughan Lane ground, drainage work and developing a four-bay outdoor practice facility.
