= North of Ireland Cricket Club =

North of Ireland
Team information
- Founded: 1859 (folded 2001)
- Home ground: Ormeau Cricket Ground

The North of Ireland Cricket Club (often referred to simply as North or by the abbreviation N.I.C.C. was a cricket club in Belfast, Northern Ireland.

At the end of the 2001 season, the club, along with its sister rugby club, merged with Collegians R.F.C., Collegians Hockey Club and the Belfast Bowling Club to form Belfast Harlequins, based at Deramore. This involved leaving its historic home on the Ormeau Road (one of the earliest international sports venues in Ireland) after a series of sectarian arson attacks, including the burning of its pavilion. The club, with a mainly Protestant membership, was perceived as being "isolated in a zone of working-class nationalism".

The Collegians Cricket Club had previously merged with Cooke Cricket Club to form Cooke Collegians Cricket Club, so the Belfast Harlequins cricket club was effectively a continuation of North. In 2004, however, dissatisfied with the Deramore pitch and the inability to attract new players, the cricket section of Belfast Harlequins folded and merged instead with Civil Service Cricket Club to form the Civil Service & North of Ireland Cricket Club, playing its first season in 2005.

== Honours ==
- Irish Senior Cup: 1
  - 1982
- NCU Senior League: 20 (5 shared)
  - 1899, 1900, 1902, 1903, 1904, 1905, 1907, 1908, 1923, 1940, 1946, 1954, 1957, 1960, 1961, 1963 (shared), 1965, 1971 (shared), 1986 (shared), 1987, 1990 (shared)
- NCU Challenge Cup: 20
  - 1889, 1900, 1901, 1902, 1903, 1904, 1906, 1907, 1910, 1912, 1925, 1938, 1951, 1956, 1960, 1969, 1980, 1982, 1990, 1999
- NCU Junior Cup: 15 (1 shared)
  - †1898, †1900, †1901, †1905, †1907, †1913, †1921, †1937, †1949, †1956 (shared), †1957, †1972, †1979, †1994, †1996

† Won by 2nd XI
