= Herbie Martin =

Northern Ireland-born cricketer and rugby union player

Personal information
- Full name: Herbert Martin
- Born: 4 May 1927; Lisburn, County Antrim, Northern Ireland
- Died: 18 February 2014 (aged 86); Brisbane, Australia
- Batting: Right-handed
- Relatives: Thomas Martin (brother)

Domestic team information
- Years: Team
- 1949–1968: Ireland

Career statistics
Competition	FC
Matches	19
Runs scored	671
Batting average	19.17
100s/50s	–/5
Top score	88
Balls bowled	–
Wickets	–
Bowling average	–
5 wickets in innings	–
10 wickets in match	–
Best bowling	–
Catches/stumpings	17/–
- Source: Cricinfo, 6 December 2009

Herbert "Herbie" Martin (4 May 1927 – 18 February 2014) was a Northern Ireland-born cricketer and rugby union player. He was a right-handed batsman.

Martin represented Ireland in 19 first-class matches, scoring 671 runs at an average of 19.17 with a high score of 88. Martin made 5 half centuries for Ireland. Domestically, he played for Lisburn Cricket Club, joining in 1938. Outside of cricket Martin also played Rugby for Instonians and Ulster as well as playing hockey for Ulster Schools'.

== See also ==
- List of Irish cricket and rugby union players
