= Donald McDonald (cricketer) =

English cricketer

Personal information
- Full name: Donald McDonald
- Born: 22 February 1887; Chard, Somerset, England
- Died: 29 June 1961 (aged 74); Southbourne, Dorset, England
- Batting: Unknown
- Bowling: Slow left-arm orthodox

Domestic team information
- Years: Team
- 1913: Scotland

Career statistics
Competition	First-class
Matches	1
Runs scored	6
Batting average	6.00
100s/50s	–/–
Top score	6
Balls bowled	288
Wickets	6
Bowling average	24.66
5 wickets in innings	1
10 wickets in match	–
Best bowling	5/51
Catches/stumpings	1/–
- Source: Cricinfo, 3 November 2022

Donald McDonald (22 February 1887 – 29 June 1961) was an English first-class cricketer of Scottish descent.

McDonald was born in February 1887 at Chard, Somerset. He was educated at Taunton School, before matriculating to the University of Edinburgh. A club cricketer for Carlton, he was selected to play for the Scottish cricket team in a single first-class match against Ireland at Edinburgh in 1913. Playing as a slow left-arm orthodox bowler in the Scottish side, McDonald met with success in the Irish first-innings by taking figures of 5 for 51, in addition to taking the wicket of Bob Lambert. Batting twice in the match, he was dismissed for 6 runs in the Scottish first innings by Basil Ward, while in their second innings he was not required to bat. McDonald served in the First World War as a captain in the Somerset Light Infantry, with attachment to the 20th (Light) Division in 1918. McDonald died in June 1961 at Southbourne, Hampshire.
