= Strangford Road =

Cricket ground in Northern Ireland

- Location: Downpatrick, Northern Ireland
- As of 4 July 2014; Source: Ground profile

Strangford Road is a cricket ground in Downpatrick, Northern Ireland, and is the home of Downpatrick Cricket Club. It has hosted fifteen Ireland international matches, including games against Australia "A" and South Africa in 1998.
