= Ken Kirkpatrick =

Irish cricketer (born 1938)

Personal information
- Full name: Alexander Kennedy Kirkpatrick
- Born: 25 July 1938 (age 88); Belfast, Northern Ireland
- Batting: Left-handed
- Bowling: Right-arm off break

Domestic team information
- Years: Team
- 1962: Ireland

Career statistics
Competition	First-class
Matches	1
Runs scored	31
Batting average	31.00
100s/50s	–/–
Top score	30
Balls bowled	72
Wickets	0
Bowling average	–
5 wickets in innings	–
10 wickets in match	–
Best bowling	–
Catches/stumpings	1/–
- Source: Cricinfo, 2 January 2022

Alexander Kennedy "Ken" Kirkpatrick (born 25 July 1938 in Belfast, Northern Ireland) is an Irish former cricketer. A left-handed batsman and off spin bowler, he played twice for the Ireland cricket team in 1962; a first-class match against the Combined Services and against Pakistan.
