= Dundrum Cricket Club =

Dundrum
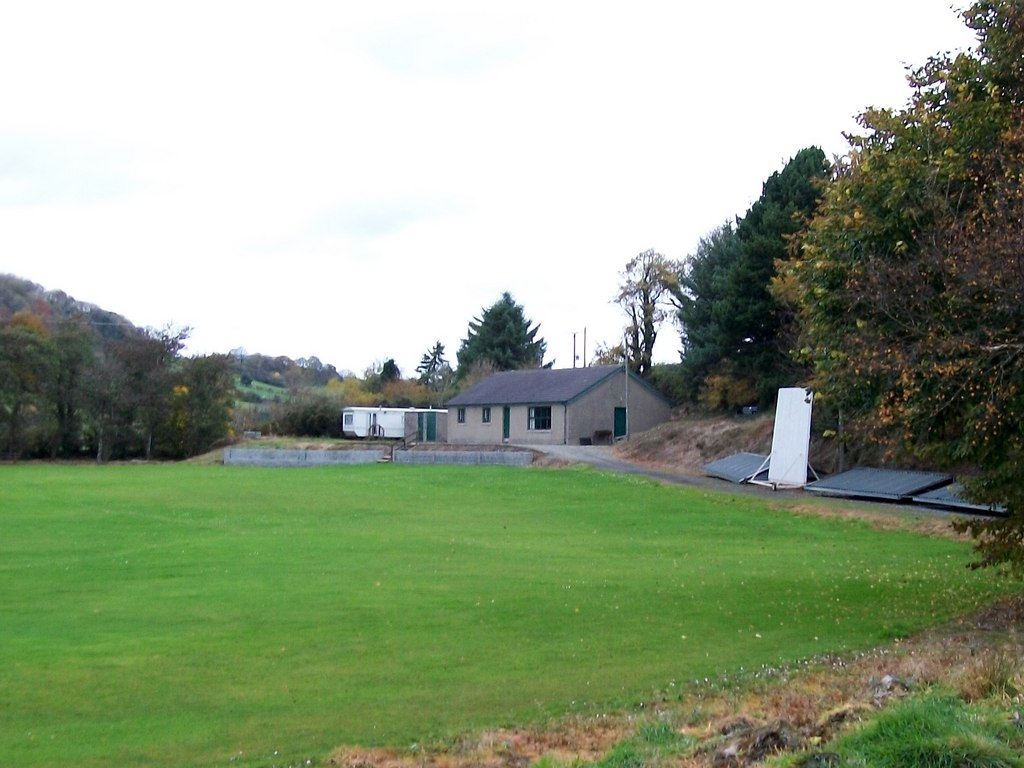
- Club grounds at "The Meadow" near Dundrum, County Down
- Association: Northern Cricket Union

Team information
- Colours: Maroon and yellow
- Founded: 1903
- Home ground: The Meadow

Dundrum Cricket Club (DCC) is a cricket club in Dundrum, County Down, Northern Ireland. As of 2024, the club was playing in Section Two of the NCU Senior League.

Dundrum Cricket Club was founded in 1903. The first clubhouse was a gift from the then Lord Downshire and was previously the late Lady Downshire's studio. The current clubhouse was opened in 1995 and an additional storeroom was built in 2013. The club originally played in the East Down League until this folded in the 1960s. In 1964, the club joined the Northern Cricket Union (NCU).

In 2020, the club's ground at "The Meadow" was subject to significant flooding during Storm Francis.
