= Queen's University Cricket Club =

Queen's University
- Official website: QUB Cricket Club

Queen's University Cricket Club is a cricket club in Belfast, Northern Ireland, affiliated to Queen's University Belfast.

The club played senior cricket in the NCU Senior League until 2000. It folded, but has recently been re-formed. Queens Cricket Club always suffered from the short term membership of players (while student plus one year after graduation). Only medical students with their longer courses could play for very long. Good players coming in from their schools would join other clubs if they immediately did not catch on with the 1st Eleven. Players always had the horrors of examinations in late May and early June when the season was getting into full swing In 1953 the team won the Qualifying Division and were promoted to the Senior League. At that time they played at the university grounds at Cherryvale on the Ravenhill Rd. a wonderful ground.

The university team never really played well until after their annual tour to a variety of venues (e.g. Scotland 1953, London area 1954, etc.) after which they seemed to jell as a team.

Colors matches were played against Trinity College Dublin and in 1957 against St Andrews the current Scottish University champion. Members of the 1953 team were Pat McMillan Capt. Ron McKinnon Vice. Capt., Robin Bailey, Frank Fee, R.J. Woods, Jimmy McKelvey, Wally Boyce, Ian Roulston, Ozzie McKee, Wally Kirkpatrick. Stewart Johnson. Edward Cathcart (Wks.) Many of these players won international caps in Cricket and other sports notably Rugby and Hockey many others emigrated immediately after graduation. It is not known when the Queens team dropped out of the Senior League.

== Honours ==
- NCU Senior League: 1
  - 1959
- NCU Challenge Cup: 1
  - 1940
