= Noel Ferguson =

Irish cricketer (1927–2007)

Cricket information
- Batting: Left-handed
- Bowling: Right-arm medium

International information
- National side: Ireland

Career statistics
Competition	First-class
Matches	5
Runs scored	122
Batting average	15.25
100s/50s	0/0
Top score	37
Balls bowled	869
Wickets	19
Bowling average	19.73
5 wickets in innings	1
10 wickets in match	0
Best bowling	6/37
Catches/stumpings	3/–
- Source: CricketArchive, 9 October 2022

William Henry Noel Ferguson (6 December 1927 – 31 October 2007) usually known as Noel Ferguson, was an Irish cricketer.

A left-handed batsman and right-arm medium-pace bowler, he made his debut for the Ireland cricket team in June 1951 against Scotland in a first-class match. He did not play for the Irish team again until June 1962 (a gap of exactly eleven years), when he returned to the side for another first-class game against the Combined Services cricket team. He remained in the team for the next two years, playing ten matches in all, his last match coming against the MCC in September 1964.

Of his matches for Ireland, five had first-class status. In all matches for Ireland, he scored 180 runs at an average of 12.86 with a top score of 37 against Scotland in July 1963. He took 27 wickets at an average of 21.15, with best bowling of 6/37 against Scotland in July 1962.
