= NCU Senior League =

Location of teams in the NCU Premier League

The Northern Cricket Union (NCU) Senior League is the provincial cricket league within the NCU jurisdiction in Ireland, which covers counties Antrim, Armagh, Down and south Tyrone of Northern Ireland. The league was formed in 1897 and is currently divided into four sections, namely the Premier League, Sections 1, 2 and 3. It is sponsored by Mercury Security & Facilities Management and marketed as the Mercury Premier League, Mercury Section 1, etc.

There are a total of 36 league members: 10 in the Premier League; 10 in Section 1; 8 in Section 2 and 8 in Section 3. There is promotion and relegation of one club between each division.

Teams play each other twice per season, once at home and once away, each season, with four points awarded for a win and two for a tie or for "no result". When two or more teams finish with the same number of points, the team with the best net run rate is placed highest. Matches consist of one innings per side, with a maximum of fifty, and a minimum of twenty overs bowled per innings.

Waringstown are the most successful side in the Premier League with 33 wins (6 shared). The current champions are Waringstown after winning the 2026 competition.

In 2020, the season was abridged due to the coronavirus pandemic and the Premier League was played as a single round of fixtures with the top four teams progressing to semi-finals and the champions declared after a final.

== Members for 2026 season ==
As of 2026, the clubs in the NCU Senior League included:

Premier League	Section 1	Section 2	Section 3
C.I.Y.M.S.; Civil Service North of Ireland; Cliftonville Academy; Instonians; Laurelvale; Lisburn; North Down; Muckamore; Waringstown; Woodvale	Armagh; Bangor; Carrickfergus; Cooke Collegians; Cregagh; Derriaghy; Donaghcloney Mill; Lurgan; Saintfield; Templepatrick	Ardent Blues; Ballymena; Belfast; B.I.S.C.; Downpatrick; Dunmurry; Holywood; Larne	Amigos Belfast; Arches; Ards & Donaghadee; Belfast Superkings; Dundrum; Drumaness Superkings; NIMACC; Victoria

Source: Northern Cricket Union

== List of champions ==
Season	Champions
1897	North Down
1898	North Down
1899	North of Ireland
1900	North of Ireland
1901	Holywood
1902	North of Ireland
1903	North of Ireland
1904	North of Ireland
1905	North of Ireland
1906	North Down
1907	North of Ireland
1908	North of Ireland
1909	Holywood
1910	North Down
1911	Waringstown
1912	Holywood
1913	Banbridge
1914	Holywood
1919	North Down
1920	Cliftonville
1921	North Down
1922	Ulster
1923	North of Ireland
1924	Waringstown
1925	Waringstown
1926	Cliftonville
1927	North Down
1928	Armagh
1929	North Down
1930	North Down
1931	Armagh
1932	North Down
1933	Lisburn
1934	North Down
1935	Woodvale
1936	North Down
1937	Lisburn
1938	Cliftonville
1939	Armagh
1940	North of Ireland
1941	Lisburn
1942	Lisburn
1943	Woodvale
1944	Waringstown
1945	Cregagh
1946	North of Ireland
1947	Cregagh
1948	Woodvale
1949	Waringstown
1950	Lisburn
1951	Lisburn
1952	Lisburn
1953	Waringstown
1954	North of Ireland
1955	Woodvale
1956	Holywood
1957	North of Ireland
1958	Holywood and Woodvale (shared)
1959	Queen's University
1960	North of Ireland
1961	North of Ireland
1962	Instonians
1963	Lisburn and North of Ireland (shared)
1964	Lisburn
1965	North of Ireland
1966	Woodvale
1967	Waringstown
1968	Downpatrick
1969	Lisburn
1970	Muckamore and Waringstown (shared)
1971	North of Ireland and Waringstown (shared)
1972	Waringstown
1973	Waringstown
1974	Downpatrick
1975	Downpatrick
1976	Waringstown
1977	Waringstown
1978	Waringstown
1979	Waringstown
1980	Lisburn
1981	Waringstown
1982	Waringstown
1983	Downpatrick
1984	Waringstown
1985	Waringstown
1986	Downpatrick and North of Ireland (shared)
1987	North of Ireland
1988	Waringstown
1989	North of Ireland and Waringstown (shared)
1990	Lurgan and North of Ireland (shared)
1991	Waringstown
1992	Waringstown
1993	Lisburn
1994	Downpatrick
1995	Cliftonville
1996	Cliftonville and Lisburn (shared)
1997	Cliftonville
1998	Ballymena
1999	North Down
2000	Waringstown
2001	North Down
2002	North Down
2003	North Down
2004	Bangor
2005	North Down and Waringstown (shared)
2006	Waringstown
2007	North Down
2008	North Down
2009	Instonians and Waringstown (shared)
2010	North Down
2011	North Down
2012	CIYMS
2013	Instonians and Waringstown (shared)
2014	Instonians
2015	Waringstown
2016	Instonians
2017	Waringstown
2018	CIYMS
2019	CIYMS
2020	North Down
2021	Waringstown
2022	Lisburn
2023	Instonians
2024	Waringstown
2025	Instonians
2026	Waringstown

== Performance by club ==
=== Summary of winners ===
Team	Wins
Waringstown	33 (6 shared)
North Down	24 (1 shared)
North of Ireland	20 (5 shared)
Lisburn	14 (2 shared)
Cliftonville	6 (1 shared)
Downpatrick	6 (1 shared)
Holywood	6 (1 shared)
Woodvale	6 (1 shared)
Instonians	6 (2 shared)
Armagh	3
CIYMS	3
Cregagh	2
Ballymena	1
Banbridge	1
Bangor	1
Queen's University	1
Ulster	1
Lurgan	1 (shared)
Muckamore	1 (shared)

== See also ==
- NCU Challenge Cup
- NCU Junior Cup
- Irish Senior Cup
- Leinster Senior League
- Ulster Cup
- North West Senior League
