= Saintfield Cricket Club =

Sports organisation in Northern Ireland

Saintfield
Personnel
- Captain: Andrew Mccavera

Team information
- Colors: Navy Blue/Yellow
- Founded: 1866
- Home ground: The Demesne

Saintfield Cricket Club is a cricket club in Saintfield, County Down, Northern Ireland, playing in League 1 of the NCU Senior League.

== Honours ==
- NCU Junior Cup: 1
  - 2003
- NCU Section 2 : 1
  - 2025
