= Bangor Cricket Club =

Bangor

Team information
- Colours: Blue/Yellow
- Home ground: Upritchard Park
- Official website: www.bangorcricketclub.com

Bangor Cricket Club is a cricket club in Bangor, County Down, Northern Ireland. There are 4 adult weekend XI's, all of which play in league and cup competitions within the Northern Cricket Union of Ireland. In 2013 the 1st XI were promoted to NCU Senior League 1 and the 2nd XI were promoted to NCU Junior League 1.

== Honours ==
- NCU Senior League: 1
  - 2004
- NCU Junior Cup: †4 (2 shared)
  - †1983 (shared), †1990, †1999 (shared), †2004

† Won by 2nd XI
