= Carrickfergus Cricket Club =

Carrickfergus

Team information
- Founded: 1868
- Home ground: Middle Road

Carrickfergus Cricket Club is a cricket club in Carrickfergus, County Antrim, Northern Ireland, playing in the Premier League of the NCU Senior League.

The club was established in 1868, and was one of the founder member clubs of the Northern Cricket Union in 1887 and remains one of the oldest surviving clubs in Ireland. Despite this longevity and pedigree, the club led a nomadic existence for more than 100 years. It was not until 1988 that their superb Middle Road ground and facilities were opened. The club gained global recognition when former Wicketkeeper batter Michael Gilmour famously score 0 off 16 balls in a T20 fixture in his final game for the Northern Irish outfit.

The club made progress through the leagues and were promoted to the Northern Cricket Union Premier League in 2004 when a young AB de Villiers was appointed as their overseas professional.

The Club won 7 trophies in 2014, including 4 for the 1st XI, and was voted as Cricket Ireland Club of the Year at its annual awards.

Carrickfergus were the 2021 NCU T20 Cup winners, and were beaten fimists in the Challenge Cup in 2023.

Famous players and former players include Ryan Eagleson, AB de Villiers, Andre Adams, Jacques Snyman and Paul Stirling.
