= Charles McCrum =

Irish former cricketer (born 1964)

Personal information
- Full name: Charles McCrum
- Born: 8 December 1964 (age 61); Belfast, Northern Ireland
- Batting: Right-handed
- Bowling: Right-arm medium
- Role: All-rounder

Domestic team information
- Years: Team
- 1992–1993: Ireland
- FC debut: 20 June 1992 Ireland v Scotland
- Last FC: 20 June 1992 Ireland v Scotland
- LA debut: 24 June 1992 Ireland v Durham
- Last LA: 22 June 1993 Ireland v Yorkshire

Career statistics
Competition	FC	LA	ICC T
Matches	1	2	7
Runs scored	109	45	125
Batting average	54.50	45.00	20.83
100s/50s	0/1	0/0	0/1
Top score	70	39*	54
Balls bowled	168	72	293
Wickets	3	0	11
Bowling average	32.33	–	21.72
5 wickets in innings	0	–	0
10 wickets in match	0	–	0
Best bowling	3/57	–	4/16
Catches/stumpings	0/–	0/–	3/–
- Source: CricketArchive, 30 October 2007

Charles McCrum (born 8 December 1964) is an Irish former cricketer. A right-handed batsman and right-arm medium pace bowler, he played 22 times for the Ireland cricket team between 1990 and 1994 including one first-class match against Scotland and two List A matches in the NatWest Trophy. His brother Paul has also played cricket for Ireland.

== Career ==
Having played once for Gloucestershire Under-25s in 1985, McCrum first played for Ireland in June 1990 against the MCC. He then spent two years out of the Ireland side before playing his only first-class match against Scotland in June 1992. This was followed by his List A debut against Durham the same month, and he rounded out 1992 with a match against the MCC, two matches against an England amateur XI and a match against Gloucestershire.

In 1993, he played his final List A match against Yorkshire before seven more matches for Ireland, including games against Barbados, Wales, the MCC and the Netherlands. He represented Ireland at the 1994 ICC Trophy, winning the man of the match award against Gibraltar, which were his last matches for Ireland.

== Statistics ==
In all matches for Ireland, McCrum scored 567 runs at an average of 25.77 with a top score of 70 against Scotland in 1992, also his highest first-class score. He took 25 wickets at an average of 29.24 with his best bowling performance being 4/16 against Gibraltar in 1994.
