= Ormeau Cricket Ground =

Former sports facility in Belfast, Northern Ireland

Coordinates: 54°35′12.51″N 5°55′18.37″W

- Interactive map of Ormeau Cricket Ground

Ground information
- Location: Belfast, Northern Ireland
- Country: Ireland
- Establishment: 1867 (first recorded match)

International information
- Only WODI: 28 July 1987: Ireland v Australia
- As of 3 September 2020; Source: Ground profile

Ormeau Cricket Ground was a cricket ground in Belfast, Northern Ireland. The first recorded match on the ground was in 1867, when North of Ireland played an All England Eleven in a non first-class match. In 1926, the ground hosted its first first-class match between Ireland and Wales. Eight further first-class matches have been played on the ground, the last of which was in 1999 between Ireland and Scotland. The first List A match held on the ground came in the 1996 NatWest Trophy between Ireland and Sussex, which resulted in a Sussex victory by 304 runs. The second and to date last List A match to be played there came in the 1999 NatWest Trophy when Ireland played the Essex Cricket Board, which Ireland won by 2 wickets. In 1987, the ground hosted a Women's One Day International between Ireland women and the Australia women, which resulted in a 110 run victory for Australia women.

At the end of the 2001 season, North of Ireland Cricket Club who played at the ground, along with its sister rugby club, merged with Collegians R.F.C., Collegians Hockey Club and the Belfast Bowling Club to form Belfast Harlequins, based at Deramore. This involved leaving Ormeau Road after a series of sectarian arson attacks, including the burning of its pavilion. The club, with a mainly Protestant membership, was perceived as being "isolated in a zone of working-class nationalism".
