= Lurgan Cricket Club =

Lurgan

Personnel
- Captain: Stephen Chambers

Team information
- Founded: 1922
- Home ground: Pollock Park
- Official website: Lurgan Cricket Club

Lurgan Cricket Club is a cricket club in Lurgan, County Armagh, Northern Ireland, playing in League 1 of the NCU Senior League.

The club was formed in 1922 by the amalgamation of Brownlow and Lurgan YMCA cricket clubs. After a short hiatus during the Second World War, it reformed in 1945 and rejoined the Northern Cricket Union. The club returned to the Senior League in 1952.

== Honours ==
- Irish Senior Cup: 3
  - 1984, 1988, 1990
- NCU Senior League: 1 (shared)
  - 1990 (shared)
- NCU Challenge Cup: 4
  - 1972, 1989, 1996, 2002
- NCU Junior Cup: 2
  - †2007, 2023

† Won by 2nd XI
