= Derriaghy Cricket Club =

Derriaghy
Personnel
- Captain: Ross Bailey
- Coach: Wayne Hughes

Team information
- Colors: Red/Blue
- Founded: 1920
- Home ground: Queensway

Derriaghy Cricket Club is a cricket club in Derriaghy, County Antrim, Northern Ireland, playing in Section 1 of the NCU Senior League. They have 3 senior teams and junior teams from U11 to U17.
