= Downpatrick Cricket Club =

Personnel
- Chairman: Jack Mcllheron
- Overseas player: R Eddy
- Chief executive: Ravi Ningegowda

Team information
- Colors: Green & Navy
- Founded: 1849
- Home ground: 2, Strangford Road, BT30 6SL, Downpatrick
- Official website: thedownpatrickcricketclub.co.uk

Downpatrick Cricket Club is a cricket club in Downpatrick, County Down, Northern Ireland playing in the NCU Senior League.

The club's Strangford Road ground has hosted 15 Ireland international matches, most recently against Australia "A" and South Africa in 1998.

Following a player shortage, the club sought demotion to Section 2 of the Senior League for the 2021 season, but did not play in the League at all.

== Honours ==
- Irish Senior Cup: 2
  - 1985, 1991
- NCU Senior League: 6 (1 shared)
  - 1968, 1974, 1975, 1983, 1986 (shared), 1994
- NCU Challenge Cup: 7
  - 1923, 1945, 1953, 1966, 1977, 1984, 1997
- NCU Junior Cup: †4
  - †1954, †1973, †1974, †1975

† Won by 2nd XI
