= Thomas McCloy =

Irish cricketer (1927–2014)

Cricket information
- Batting: Right-handed
- Bowling: Leg spin

International information
- National side: Ireland

Career statistics
| Competition | First-class |
|---|---|
| Matches | 12 |
| Runs scored | 374 |
| Batting average | 15.58 |
| 100s/50s | 0/2 |
| Top score | 53 |
| Catches/stumpings | 6/– |
- Source: CricketArchive, 16 November 2022

Thomas McCloy (31 August 1927 – 13 January 2014) was born in Lambeg, County Antrim, Northern Ireland and was an Irish cricketer. A right-handed batsman and leg spin bowler, he played 30 times for the Ireland cricket team between 1951 and 1965 including twelve first-class matches.

== Playing career ==
McCloy made his debut for Ireland in July 1951, when he played two matches against South Africa, one in Belfast and one in Dublin. He played against the MCC at Lord's the following month, and played twice against India in June 1952 before making his first-class debut against Scotland on 5 July that year.

He played just once in the following six years, against Lancashire in May 1954, returning to a more regular place in the Irish side from July 1958 when he played against New Zealand. He played against the MCC in September of that year, and against Scotland, Lancashire, Yorkshire and the MCC in 1959.

The first year of the 1960s saw him play against Scotland, Leicestershire and the MCC, with just a match against Leicestershire in 1961. He played against the Combined Services, Scotland, Pakistan and the MCC in 1962, before his career began to wind down in 1963, when he played twice against the West Indies before matches against Leicestershire, Scotland and the MCC.

He played just once in 1964, against the MCC in September, before the final three matches of his international career in 1965 against the MCC, New Zealand and Scotland.

=== Statistics ===
In all matches for Ireland, McCloy scored 836 runs at an average of 14.93. His top-score was 73 against the MCC in August 1959. He bowled just one over, conceding fifteen runs without taking a wicket against Scotland in June 1959. In first-class cricket, his top-score was 53 against the Combined Services.
