= Woodvale Cricket Club =

Sports organisation in Northern Ireland

Woodvale
Team information
- Founded: 1887
- Home ground: Ballygomartin Road

Woodvale Cricket Club is a cricket club in Belfast, Northern Ireland, playing in the Premier League in the Northern Cricket Union (NCU).

The club was formed in 1887.

== Honours ==
- NCU Senior League: 6 (1 shared)
  - 1935, 1943, 1948, 1955, 1958 (shared), 1966
- NCU Challenge Cup: 10
  - 1933, 1937, 1939, 1941, 1948, 1949, 1950, 1952, 1954, 1998
- NCU Junior Cup: ‡11
  - 1909, †1951, †1955, †1960, †1962, †1976, †1980, †1982, †1989, †1993, †1995

‡ 10 won by 2nd XI † Won by 2nd XI
