= Muckamore Cricket Club =

Cricket club in Northern Ireland

Muckamore
Team information
- Founded: 1874
- Home ground: Moylena

Muckamore Cricket Club is a cricket club in Antrim, County Antrim, Northern Ireland, playing in the NCU League 1.

The club was formed by John Joseph Robinson, a member of the staff of the York Street Flax Spinning Company, who played for Massereene in the late 1860s. When he came to live at the Muckamore School House with the Entwhistle family in 1874 he formed Muckamore Cricket Club. The original ground was at Boghead but circumstances meant the ground was moved to Oldstone and later to Moylena, where we have been playing continuously for about 125 years.

In 1894, a local minister strongly disapproved of a barrel of beer being delivered to the ground each Saturday and finished on the Sunday, so he formed Greenmount Cricket Club for the junior members and boys from his Bible class. This club played on the opposite side of the Six Mile Water from Moylena, but in 1897 the two clubs agreed to merge, electing John G. Entwhistle to captain Muckamore, a position he continuously held for 27 years.

== Honours ==
- NCU Senior League: 1 (shared)
  - 1970 (shared)
- NCU Challenge Cup: 2
  - 1963, 2024
- NCU Junior Cup: ‡7 (2 shared)
  - 1923, 1925, 1931, 1950 (shared), †1983 (shared), †1987, †1998

‡ 3 (1 shared) won by 2nd XI † Won by 2nd XI
