= North Down Cricket Club =

Irish cricket club

North Down

Team information
- Founded: 1857
- Home ground: The Green, Comber
- Official website: : North Down Cricket Club

North Down Cricket Club is an Irish cricket club based in Comber, County Down, Northern Ireland, playing in the NCU Premier League. It was founded in 1857. Currently the Club fields four Saturday/Sunday XIs, Colts XI and under-11, under-13 and under-15 sides.

== Honours ==
- Irish Senior Cup: 3
  - 1989, 1993, 1995
- NCU Senior League: 24 (1 shared)
  - 1897, 1898, 1906, 1910, 1919, 1921, 1927, 1929, 1930, 1932, 1934, 1936, 1999, 2001, 2002, 2003, 2005 (shared), 2007, 2008, 2010, 2011, 2020
- NCU Challenge Cup: 32 (1 shared)
  - 1887, 1888, 1890, 1891, 1892, 1893, 1894, 1897, 1898, 1908, 1913, 1919, 1920, 1924, 1926, 1927, 1928, 1931, 1932, 1934, 1935, 1936, 1981, 1991, 1994 (shared), 2000, 2001, 2003, 2004, 2005, 2007, 2010
- Ulster Cup: 3
  - 2002, 2006, 2015
- NCU Junior Cup: †10
  - †1894, †1897, †1902, †1904, †1926, †1981, †1986, †2006, †2013, †2019

† Won by 2nd XI

== Notable players ==
- Anwar Ali
- Aniruddha Chore
