= Donaghcloney Mill Cricket Club =

Cricket club in County Down, Northern Ireland

Donacloney Mill
Personnel
- Captain: Mathew Lyttle
- Coach: Raymond Mathews, Stephen Hanna, Bruce Topping
- Overseas player(s): Mansing Nigade, Rahul Desai, Avadhoot Dandekar, Petras Pienaar

Team information
- Colors: Red and Green
- Founded: 2017
- Home ground: The Factory Ground, Banford Green

Donaghcloney Mill Cricket Club is a cricket club in Donaghcloney, County Down, Northern Ireland, playing in Section 1 of the NCU Senior League.

It was formed in 2017, when Donacloney Cricket Club and the club merged with Millpark Cricket Club merged and adopted the name Donaghcloney Mill.

Donacloney had been founded by the Liddell family, proprietors of the William Liddell & Co. factory in the village of Donaghcloney. The Liddells were members of the North of Ireland Cricket Club in Belfast and decided to establish a club in Donaghcloney for the recreation of the factory workers.
