= Ballymena Cricket Club =

Ballymena
Team information
- Home ground: Eaton Park

Ballymena Cricket Club is a cricket club in Ballymena, County Antrim, Northern Ireland, playing in Section 1 of the NCU Senior League.

== Honours ==
- NCU Senior League: 1
  - 1998
- NCU Junior Cup: ‡4
  - 1906, 1935, 1939, †1984
- Lagan Valley Steels T20 Trophy
  - 2021

‡ 1 won by 2nd XI † Won by 2nd XI
