= Lisburn Cricket Club =

Lisburn
Team information
- Founded: 1836
- Home ground: Wallace Park

Lisburn Cricket Club is a cricket club in Lisburn, County Antrim, Northern Ireland, playing in the Premier League of the NCU Senior League.

Established in 1836, the club is the oldest in Northern Ireland. It is also one of the most successful, having won the league title eleven times and the Senior Cup on eleven occasions. The club's grounds are at Wallace Park in Lisburn.

== Notable former players ==
Ireland men's internationals

- Neil Doak
- Jimmy Kirkwood
- Herbie Martin
- Thomas Martin
- Dermott Monteith
- Nelson Russell
- Jack Simpson

India men's internationals

- Faiz Fazal

Ireland rugby union internationals

- Neil Doak
- Ian Whitten

Ireland U21 rugby union international

- Mike McComish

Ireland field hockey internationals

- Jonathan Bell
- Tim Cockram
- Jimmy Kirkwood
- Nelson Russell

Great Britain field hockey international

- Jimmy Kirkwood

Recipients of the Military Cross

- Nelson Russell

== Honours ==
- NCU Senior League: 14 (2 shared)
  - 1933, 1937, 1941, 1942, 1950, 1951, 1952, 1963 (shared), 1964, 1980, 1993, 1996 (shared), 2022
- NCU Challenge Cup: 11 (2 shared)
  - 1929, 1942, 1946, 1955, 1957, 1958 (shared), 1959, 1961, 1962, 1985, 1994 (shared)
- Ulster Cup: 1
  - 2000
- NCU Junior Cup: †8
  - †1903, †1933, †1947, †1958, †1959, †1964, †1992, †2016, †2026

† Won by 2nd XI
