= C.I.Y.M.S. Cricket Club =

Sports club in Belfast, Northern Ireland

C.I.Y.M.S.

Team information
- Home ground: Circular Road

C.I.Y.M.S. Cricket Club is a cricket club in Belfast, Northern Ireland, playing in the NCU Premier League. C.I.Y.M.S. is an acronym for Church of Ireland Young Men's Society, a body initially established for young men belonging to the Church of Ireland, but the society is now open to men and women of all religions and denominations.

== History ==
The club was founded by members of the Church of Ireland Young Men's Society whom were working in a soup kitchen by Belfast City Hall. In 1964, CIYMS moved from central Belfast to a new ground at Circular Road, Belfast. The ground-breaking ceremony was overseen by the Church of Ireland bishops Mitchell of Down and Dromore and Eliott of Connor

In 2015, CIYMS won the NCU Senior Challenge Cup for the first time. In 2019, CIYMS won the All-Ireland T20 Cup. This also enabled them to take part in the 2020 European Cricket League, becoming Ireland's first entrant. However, they were unable to play due to the COVID-19 pandemic in Spain cancelling the tournament. They won a play-off in 2020 against YMCA Cricket Club to compete the next year but this was also cancelled. CIYMS would eventually be able to compete in the 2023 European Cricket League after winning the All-Ireland T20 Cup in 2022, despite a broken down bus delaying their arrival to Spain for the tournament. They finished third behind France's Dreux and England's Hornchurch though CIYMS' Jason van der Merwe was awarded the MVP trophy. CIYMS qualified for the 2024 European Cricket League. After winning their group and progressing to the Championship Week, they were eliminated following a loss to Jersey's Old Victorians.

== Honours ==
- Irish Senior Cup: 1
  - 2022
- NCU Senior League: 3
  - 2012, 2018, 2019
- NCU Challenge Cup: 5
  - 2015, 2017, 2019, 2021, 2022
- NCU Junior Cup: 2
  - 1968, 1991
