= Civil Service North of Ireland Cricket Club =

Cricket club in Belfast, Northern Ireland

Civil Service North of Ireland

Personnel
- Captain: Stuart Thompson
- Overseas player: Ashwin Hebbar

Team information
- Colors: Navy/sky blue
- Founded: 2004
- Home ground: Stormont

Civil Service North of Ireland Cricket Club (CSNICC, formally Civil Service & North of Ireland Cricket Club and often referred to as Civil Service North or C.S.N.I.) is a cricket club in Belfast, Northern Ireland, playing in the Premier League of the NCU Senior League.

The club was formed in 2004 as a merger of Civil Service Cricket Club and North of Ireland Cricket Club, the latter of which had originally folded in 2001 to merge with North of Ireland Football Club, Collegians R.F.C., Collegians Hockey Club and the Belfast Bowling Club as Belfast Harlequins. The former North cricketers, however, were dissatisfied with the Harlequins pitch at Deramore and an inability to attract new players, and decided to merge with Civil Service (first having briefly to reform the North of Ireland Club), playing its first season in 2005.

== Honours ==
- NCU Challenge Cup: 4
  - 2008, 2014, 2016, 2026
- Ulster Cup: 1
  - 2009
- NCU Junior Cup: 1
  - 2022
