= Cregagh Cricket Club =

Cricket club in Belfast, Northern Ireland

Cregagh
Team information
- Founded: 1906
- Home ground: Cregagh Memorial Recreation Ground, Gibson Park

Cregagh Cricket Club is a cricket club in Belfast, Northern Ireland, playing in Section 1 of the NCU Senior League. It shares a ground with Orangefield Old Boys F.C.

== Honours ==
- NCU Senior League: 2
  - 1945, 1947
- NCU Junior Cup: ‡2
  - †1934, 1936

‡ 1 by 2nd XI † Won by 2nd XI
