= Northern Cricket Union of Ireland =

Provincial sports governing body

- Sport: Cricket
- Abbreviation: NCU
- Founded: 1886
- Headquarters: Belfast
- President: Ian Houston
- Chairman: Andrew Cowden
- CEO: Callum Atkinson
- Vice president: Andrew Clement
- Coach: Simon Johnston

Official website
- www.northerncricketunion.org
- Other key staff: Matthew Humphreys (Northern Knights captain)

The Northern Cricket Union of Ireland, more usually referred to as the N.C.U., is one of five provincial governing bodies for the sport in Ireland. Along with the Connacht, Leinster, Munster and North West unions, it makes up the Irish Cricket Union (now known as Cricket Ireland), the overall governing body of Irish cricket.

The North of Ireland jurisdiction covers counties Antrim, Armagh and Down and part of Tyrone in Northern Ireland. The object of the NCU is "to promote and improve cricket generally in Northern Ireland among men and women, the able-bodied and the disabled".

== History ==
The Union was founded in 1886 and is the oldest of the five provincial unions in Ireland. It has organised the NCU Challenge Cup since 1887 and the NCU Senior League since 1897. In 2005, there were 50 clubs fielding 137 teams affiliated to the union.

In 2013, Cricket Ireland formed a three-day Interprovincial Championship, featuring teams from Leinster, NCU and the North West. The NCU team is known as the Northern Knights.

== See also ==
- NCU Challenge Cup
- NCU Junior Cup
- List of Northern Ireland cricket clubs
