= 2025 Cricket Leinster Premier League =

- Dates: April 2025 – September 2025
- Administrator(s): Leinster Cricket Union
- Cricket format: 50 Over
- Tournament format(s): Group stage
- Official website: www.cricketleinster.ie

The 2025 Leinster Premier League is the 107th edition of the Leinster Premier League, club cricket league within Leinster. The tournament will be played from April 2025, with the final round scheduled for September 2025. Pembroke are the defending champions.

== Teams ==
The teams were split based on the finishing positions in the 2024, with 12 teams in Division One and 5 in The First Team League.

Premier League sides play each other once, either home or away. Halfway through the season the league splits into a Premier League and Championship, teams play opposing teams in their respective competition again. Teams were allowed to field a maximum of one overseas professional in a match.

=== Premier League ===
Team	Home ground	Captain
Balbriggan	Jack Harper Memorial Ground, Balbriggan	(South Africa) Greg Ford
Clontarf	Castle Avenue, Clontarf	(Ireland) David Delany
Cork County	The Mardyke, Cork	(Ireland) Diarmuid Carey
Leinster	Observatory Lane, Rathmines	(Pakistan) Bilal Azhar
Malahide	The Village, Malahide	(England) James Newland
Merrion	Anglesea Road, Ballsbridge	(Ireland) Max Sorensen
North County	The Inch, Balrothery	(Ireland) Eddie Richardson
Pembroke	Sydney Parade, Sandymount	(Ireland) Paul Lawson
Phoenix	Phoenix Park, Dublin 8	(Ireland) Adam Chester
Railway Union	Park Avenue, Sanymount	(Ireland) Philippus le Roux
Rush	Kenure, Rush	(Ireland) Jarred Barnes
The Hills	The Vineyard, Skerries	(Ireland) Tomás Rooney Murphy

Team promoted from Championship in 2024

== Fixtures ==
=== April ===
==== Round 1 ====
26 April 2025
12:00

Clontarf {{{score1}}}	v	Balbriggan {{{score2}}}

Castle Avenue

26 April 2025
12:00

Leinster {{{score1}}}	v	Cork County {{{score2}}}

Observatory Lane

26 April 2025
12:00

Phoenix {{{score1}}}	v	Merrion {{{score2}}}

Phoenix Park

26 April 2025
12:00

North County {{{score1}}}	v	Pembroke {{{score2}}}

Inch

26 April 2025
12:00

Malahide {{{score1}}}	v	Railway Union {{{score2}}}

Malahide

26 April 2025
12:00

The Hills {{{score1}}}	v	Rush {{{score2}}}

The Vineyard

=== May ===
==== Round 2 ====
3 May 2025
12:00

Balbriggan {{{score1}}}	v	Leinster {{{score2}}}

Jack Harper Ground

3 May 2025
12:00

Cork County {{{score1}}}	v	Phoenix {{{score2}}}

The Mardyke

3 May 2025
12:00

Merrion {{{score1}}}	v	Malahide {{{score2}}}

Anglesea Road

3 May 2025
12:00

Clontarf {{{score1}}}	v	The Hills {{{score2}}}

Castle Avenue

3 May 2025
12:00

Pembroke {{{score1}}}	v	Railway Union {{{score2}}}

Sydney Parade

3 May 2025
12:00

Rush {{{score1}}}	v	North County {{{score2}}}

Kenure

==== Round 3 ====
5 May 2025
12:00

Railway Union {{{score1}}}	v	Clontarf {{{score2}}}

Park Avenue

5 May 2025
12:00

Malahide {{{score1}}}	v	Leinster {{{score2}}}

Malahide

5 May 2025
12:00

Phoenix {{{score1}}}	v	Balbriggan {{{score2}}}

Phoenix Park

5 May 2025
12:00

Pembroke {{{score1}}}	v	Rush {{{score2}}}

Sydney Parade

5 May 2025
12:00

The Hills {{{score1}}}	v	Merrion {{{score2}}}

The Vineyard

5 May 2025
12:00

North County {{{score1}}}	v	Cork County {{{score2}}}

Inch

==== Round 4 ====
24 May 2025
12:00

Leinster {{{score1}}}	v	Clontarf {{{score2}}}

Observatory Lane

24 May 2025
12:00

Cork County {{{score1}}}	v	Merrion {{{score2}}}

The Mardyke

24 May 2025
12:00

Rush {{{score1}}}	v	Railway Union {{{score2}}}

Kenure

24 May 2025
12:00

Malahide {{{score1}}}	v	The Hills {{{score2}}}

Malahide

24 May 2025
12:00

Pembroke {{{score1}}}	v	Phoenix {{{score2}}}

Sydney Parade

24 May 2025
12:00

Balbriggan {{{score1}}}	v	North County {{{score2}}}

Jack Harper Ground

=== June ===
==== Round 5 ====
2 June 2025
12:00

Merrion {{{score1}}}	v	Pembroke {{{score2}}}

Anglesea Road

2 June 2025
12:00

Clontarf {{{score1}}}	v	Phoenix {{{score2}}}

Castle Avenue

2 June 2025
12:00

Cork County {{{score1}}}	v	Railway Union {{{score2}}}

The Mardyke

2 June 2025
12:00

Malahide {{{score1}}}	v	Rush {{{score2}}}

Malahide

2 June 2025
12:00

North County {{{score1}}}	v	Leinster {{{score2}}}

Inch

2 June 2025
12:00

The Hills {{{score1}}}	v	Balbriggan {{{score2}}}

The Vineyard

==== Round 6 ====
7 June 2025

Phoenix; TBD	v	North County; TBD

TBD

7 June 2025

Merrion; TBD	v	Balbriggan; TBD

TBD

7 June 2025

Clontarf; TBD	v	Malahide; TBD

TBD

7 June 2025

Railway Union; TBD	v	The Hills; TBD

TBD

7 June 2025

Rush; TBD	v	Cork County; TBD

TBD

7 June 2025

Pembroke; TBD	v	Leinster; TBD

TBD

==== Round 7 ====
14 June 2025

North County; TBD	v	Malahide; TBD

TBD

14 June 2025

Rush; TBD	v	Clontarf; TBD

TBD

14 June 2025

Railway Union; TBD	v	Merrion; TBD

TBD

14 June 2025

Cork County; TBD	v	The Hills; TBD

TBD

14 June 2025

Balbriggan; TBD	v	Pembroke; TBD

TBD

14 June 2025

Leinster; TBD	v	Phoenix; TBD

TBD

==== Round 8 ====
22 June 2025

Pembroke; TBD	v	Cork County; TBD

TBD

22 June 2025

Merrion; TBD	v	Clontarf; TBD

TBD

22 June 2025

Balbriggan; TBD	v	Malahide; TBD

TBD

22 June 2025

Railway Union; TBD	v	Phoenix; TBD

TBD

22 June 2025

The Hills; TBD	v	North County; TBD

TBD

22 June 2025

Rush; TBD	v	Leinster; TBD

TBD

=== July ===
==== Round 9 ====
28 June 2025

Clontarf; TBD	v	Pembroke; TBD

TBD

28 June 2025

Rush; TBD	v	Phoenix; TBD

TBD

28 June 2025

Balbriggan; TBD	v	Railway Union; TBD

TBD

28 June 2025

Merrion; TBD	v	North County; TBD

TBD

28 June 2025

The Hills; TBD	v	Leinster; TBD

TBD

28 June 2025

Malahide; TBD	v	Cork County; TBD

TBD

==== Round 10 ====
19 July 2025

The Hills; TBD	v	Pembroke; TBD

TBD

19 July 2025

North County; TBD	v	Clontarf; TBD

TBD

19 July 2025

Cork County; TBD	v	Balbriggan; TBD

TBD

19 July 2025

Leinster; TBD	v	Railway Union; TBD

TBD

19 July 2025

Merrion; TBD	v	Rush; TBD

TBD

19 July 2025

Phoenix; TBD	v	Malahide; TBD

TBD
