= Railway Union Sports Club =

Irish sports club, based in Dublin

- Union: Hockey Ireland; Cricket Ireland; IRFU; FAI
- Full name: Railway and Steam Packet Athletic and Social Union
- Founded: 1904
- Ground: Park Avenue; Sandymount; Dublin 4 Ireland
- Website: railwayunionsc.com
- League: Men's Irish Hockey League; Women's Irish Hockey League; Women's All-Ireland League (rugby union); Leinster League (rugby union); Leinster Senior League (cricket); AUL (association football)

Railway Union Sports Club is a multi-sports club based in Sandymount, Dublin 4, Ireland. The club was founded in 1904 and was originally known as the Railway and Steam Packet Athletic and Social Union. The club organises teams in various sports and activities including cricket, field hockey, indoor hockey, rugby union, association football, tennis, bowls and bridge. Railway Union women's field hockey and women's rugby union teams both play in the top level of their respective national leagues. Railway Union women's field hockey team also represented Ireland in the 2014 EuroHockey Club Champions Cup. They also went represented Ireland at the EHL, Europes top competition in 2025 and 2026.

== History ==
=== Men's field hockey ===
The men's senior field hockey team plays in the Men's Irish Hockey League In 2018–19 they became founder members of the league's Division 2. The men's senior field hockey team also enters the Irish Senior Cup while the reserve team plays in the Irish Junior Cup.

Irish Senior Cup

Season	Winners	Score	Runners up
1926	Banbridge	5–1	Railway & Steam Packet Union
1927	Lisnagarvey	2–1 (Note: After extra time)	Railway & Steam Packet Union
1929	Railway & Steam Packet Union		Limerick PYMA
1930	Railway & Steam Packet Union	2–1 (Note: After extra time)	Limerick PYMA
1931	Railway Union	2–0	Maryville
1938	Railway Union	1–0 (Note: After replay and two periods of extra time, first game finished 0–0)	Cork Harlequins
1968	Cork Church of Ireland	1–0	Railway Union
1975	Cliftonville	1–0	Railway Union
2012	Cork Harlequins	4–3	Railway Union

Notes

Irish Junior Cup

Season	Winners	Score	Runners up
1925	Railway Union II	2–0	Ennis
1940	Maryborough		Railway Union II
1957	Railway Union II		Carlow
1967	Lisnagarvey II	1–0	Railway Union II
1975	Railway Union II	3–1 (Note: After extra time)	Lisnagarvey II

=== Women's field hockey ===
Railway Union's senior women's field hockey team play in the Women's Irish Hockey League and the Irish Senior Cup. During the first five seasons of the Women's Irish Hockey League, Railway Union emerged as the league's strongest team, winning three titles in fours seasons. During this era the team featured, among others, Cecelia and Isobel Joyce, Emer Lucey, Nicola Evans, Kate McKenna, Jeamie Deacon and Grace O'Flanagan. Railway Union were champions for the first time in 2009–10, before winning further titles in 2011–12 and 2012–13. In 2012–13 Railway Union also completed a national double, winning both the Women's Irish Hockey League and the Irish Senior Cup. In the cup final Railway Union defeated UCD 3–2. Railway Union also represented Ireland in European club competitions, including the 2014 EuroHockey Club Champions Cup.

Women's Irish Hockey League

Season	Winners	Score	Runners up
2009–10	Railway Union	4–0	Cork Harlequins
2011–12	Railway Union		Loreto
2012–13	Railway Union	(Note: Railway Union won after a penalty shoot-out)	Loreto
2013–14	UCD		Railway Union

Notes

Irish Senior Cup

Season	Winners	Score	Runners up
2009–10	Loreto	2–2 (Note: Loreto won 4–2 after penalty shoot-out)	Railway Union
2012–13	Railway Union	3–2	UCD

Irish Junior Cup

Railway Union's reserve women's field hockey team play in the Irish Junior Cup. Cecelia Joyce and Kate McKenna were members of the 2018 winning team.

Season	Winners	Score	Runners up
1966	Portadown I	6–0	Railway Union II
1974	Pegasus II	1–0	Railway Union
1976	Carrick	1–0	Railway Union II
1977	Railway Union II		
1978	Portadown II	3–0 (Note: After replay, first game finished 1–1)	Railway Union II
2008	Glennane	5–1	Railway Union II
2009	Hermes II (Note: Hermes II won 3–1 after penalty shoot-out)	1–1	Railway Union II
2011	Railway Union		Lisnagarvey
2017	Railway Union	2–0	Pembroke Wanderers
2018	Railway Union	2–0	UCD

=== Men's rugby union ===
Railway Union's first and second men's rugby union teams both play in the Leinster League.

=== Women's rugby union ===
The women's rugby union first team plays in the Women's All-Ireland League. The second team plays in the Leinster League. In 2014–15, with a team featuring Cliodhna Moloney, the first team won the Women's All Ireland Cup after defeating Highfield 27–0. In 2017–18, with a team featuring Larissa Muldoon and Lindsay Peat, the first team won the cup for a second time. In the final they defeated UL Bohemians 33–3.

Women's All Ireland Cup

Season	Winners	Score	Runners up
2014–15	Railway Union	27–0	Highfield
2017–18	Railway Union	33–3	UL Bohemians

=== Cricket ===
Railway Union Cricket Club has five men's teams playing in Leinster Cricket Union competitions. The first XI play in the Leinster Senior League. There is also a women's team and boys' and girls' teams for all age groups. The men's first XI also play in the Irish Senior Cup and the Leinster Senior Cup.

Irish Senior Cup

Season	Winners	Runners-Up	Venue	Match Notes
2003	North County	Railway Union	Castle Avenue	North County 217–7 (E Morgan 70); Railway Union 146 all out (C Mullen 58, P Mooney 4–19). North County won by 71 runs.
2005	North County	Railway Union	Castle Avenue	Railway Union 182–8 (50 overs A Murphy 80); North County 185–5 (44.2 overs J Mooney 57 no). North County won by 5 wickets.
2006	Railway Union	Rush	Castle Avenue	Rush 206–7 (50 overs, S Iqbal 58); Railway Union 210–9 (43.2 overs A Murphy 50, N Mullen 4–32). Railway Union won by 1 wicket.
2010	Merrion	Railway Union	Balrothery	Railway Union 317–3 (50 overs Kevin O'Brien 76, Trent Johnston 71, T Fisher 69); Merrion 164–1 (26 overs Greg Clarence 80no, Dominick Joyce 72no). Merrion won by 36 runs. (Duckworth-Lewis par score: 128 in 26 overs)

Leinster Senior Cup

Season	Winners	Runners-up	Match Scores
1949	Phoenix	Railway Union	
1950	Clontarf	Railway Union	
1961	Dublin University	Railway Union	
1967	Railway Union	Phoenix	
1974	Pembroke	Railway Union	
1981	Leinster	Railway Union	
1988	YMCA	Railway Union	
2010	Railway Union	Clontarf	

=== Association football ===
Railway Union's senior men's association football team play in the Athletic Union League. and in the FAI Junior Cup. They have previously played in the Leinster Senior League, finishing as runners up in the Senior Division in 1980–81. An under-20 team also plays in the AUL.

== Notable players ==
=== Field hockey ===
Ireland men's internationals

- Kenny Carroll

Ireland women's internationals

- Jeamie Deacon
- Nicola Evans
- Sarah Hawkshaw
- Grace O'Flanagan
- Katie Mullan
- Aisling Utri (Also represented Australia in field hockey before switching to Ireland)

Ireland A women's internationals

- Emer Lucey

Ireland women's cricket internationals

- Cecelia Joyce
- Isobel Joyce
- Kate McKenna

Republic of Ireland association football internationals

- Harry Cannon

=== Rugby union ===
Ireland men internationals

- E.W. Jeffares; 1912–13 (2 Ireland Caps)
- R.D. Patterson; 1912–13 (8 Ireland Caps)
- George Hamlet; 1902–1911 (30 Ireland Caps)
- Jim William Golding; 1879 (Ireland v Scotland)

Ireland women internationals

- Cliodhna Moloney
- Ciara Cooney
- Lindsay Peat
- Ailsa Hughes
- Amee-Leigh Costigan
- Anna McGann
- Kim Flood
- Nikki Caughey
- Larissa Muldoon
- Stacey Flood
- Eve Higgins
- Leah Tarpey

Ireland women sevens internationals

- Chloe Blackmore
- Kim Flood
- Stacey Flood
- Katie Heffernan
- Eve Higgins
- Anna McGann
- Amee-Leigh Costigan
- Martina McCarthy
- Larissa Muldoon
- Emma Murphy
- Susan Vaughan
- Faith Oviawe

=== Cricket ===
Ireland men's cricket internationals

- Louis Bookman
- Kenny Carroll
- Kevin O'Brien
- Niall O'Brien
- Joey O'Meara
- Trent Johnston
- Jason Molins
- Frank Miller

Ireland women's cricket internationals

- Lara Molins
- Nikki Squire

== Facilities ==
Railway Union Sports Club is based at Park Avenue. The facilities include a full size 6-rink bowling green, a floodlit astro field hockey pitch, three grass and seven floodlit all-weather tennis courts, two association football pitches, a cricket ground and a full size rugby union pitch.

== Honours ==
=== Men's field hockey ===
- Irish Senior Cup
  - Winners: 1929, 1930, 1931, 1938: 4
  - Runners Up: 1926, 1927, 1968, 1975, 2012: 5
- Irish Junior Cup
  - Winners: 1925, 1957, 1975: 3
  - Runners Up: 1940, 1967: 8

=== Women's field hockey ===
- Women's Irish Hockey League
  - Winners: 2009–10, 2011–12, 2012–13: 3
  - Runners Up: 2013–14: 1
- Irish Senior Cup
  - Winners: 2012–13, 2023-24, 2024-25, 2025-26: 4
- Irish Junior Cup
  - Winners: 1977, 2011, 2017, 2018: 4
  - Runners Up: 1966, 1974, 1976, 1978, 2008, 2009 : 7

=== Men's rugby union ===
- Leinster League Division 2B
  - Winners: 2012–13: 1
- Leinster League Division Three
  - Winners: 1995–96: 1
- Leinster Junior Challenge Cup
  - Winners: 1920–21: 1
- Leinster Junior League
  - Winners: 1937–38: 1
- Kinsale Sevens
  - Winners: 1988–89: 1

=== Women's rugby union ===
- All Ireland Cup
  - Winners: 2014–15, 2017–18 : 2
- All Ireland League Division 2
  - Winners: 2013–14
- Kinsale Sevens
  - Winners: 2012–13, 2013–14, 2017–18 : 2

=== Cricket ===
- Irish Senior Cup
  - Winners: 2006: 1
  - Runners Up: 2003, 2005, 2006
- Leinster Senior League
  - Winners: 1960, 1962, 2011: 3
- Leinster Senior Cup
  - Winners: 1967, 2010: 2
  - Runners Up: 1949, 1950, 1961, 1974, 1981, 1988: 6
