= 2016 Women's World Twenty20 squads =

List of cricketers

2016 ICC Women's World Twenty20 was the fifth edition of ICC Women's World Twenty20. The tournament was hosted in India for the first time. Australia were the defending champions, after winning the 2014 tournament in Bangladesh.

Below is a list of the squads which participated in the 2016 ICC Women's World Twenty20. The lists display the player's age and the number of T20I matches played (excluding the warm-up matches) at the start of the tournament.

== Australia ==
On 9 February 2016, Cricket Australia announced its squad.
Coach: Matthew Mott

No.	Player	Date of birth	T20I Matches	Batting	Bowling style	Domestic team
17	Meg Lanning (c)	25 March 1992 (aged 23)	61	Right	Right-arm medium	(Australia) Victorian Spirit
2	Alex Blackwell (v/c)	31 August 1983 (aged 32)	85	Right	Right-arm medium	(Australia) New South Wales Breakers
14	Kristen Beams	6 November 1984 (aged 31)	8	Right	Leg break	(Australia) Victorian Spirit
	Nicola Carey^{1}	10 September 1993 (aged 22)	0	Left	Right-arm medium	(Australia) New South Wales Breakers
1	Lauren Cheatle	6 November 1998 (aged 17)	4	Left	Left-arm fast-medium	(Australia) New South Wales Breakers
15	Sarah Coyte	30 March 1991 (aged 24)	47	Right	Right-arm medium	(Australia) South Australian Scorpions
13	Rene Farrell	13 January 1987 (aged 29)	48	Right	Right-arm fast-medium	(Australia) New South Wales Breakers
5	Holly Ferling	22 December 1995 (aged 20)	9	Right	Right-arm fast-medium	(Australia) Queensland Fire
77	Alyssa Healy (wk)	24 March 1990 (aged 25)	62	Right		(Australia) New South Wales Breakers
21	Jess Jonassen	5 November 1992 (aged 23)	40	Left	Slow left-arm orthodox	(Australia) Queensland Fire
6	Beth Mooney (wk)	14 January 1994 (aged 22)	4	Left		(Australia) Queensland Fire
25	Erin Osborne	27 June 1989 (aged 26)	53	Right	Right-arm off break	(Australia) ACT Meteors
8	Ellyse Perry	3 November 1990 (aged 25)	75	Right	Right-arm fast-medium	(Australia) New South Wales Breakers
3	Megan Schutt	15 January 1993 (aged 23)	17	Right	Right-arm fast-medium	(Australia) South Australian Scorpions
4	Elyse Villani	6 October 1989 (aged 26)	32	Right	Right-arm fast-medium	(Australia) Western Fury
Withdrawn players
48	Grace Harris^{1}	18 September 1993 (aged 22)	11	Right	Right-arm medium	(Australia) Queensland Fire

^{1}On 11 March 2016, Cricket Australia reported it was withdrawing Grace Harris, diagnosed with deep vein thrombosis and named Nicola Carey as replacement.

== Bangladesh ==
On 10 February 2016, the Bangladesh Cricket Board announced its squad.
Coach: (Sri Lanka) Janak Gamage

No.	Player	Date of birth	T20I Matches	Batting	Bowling style	Domestic team
26	Jahanara Alam (c)	1 April 1993 (aged 22)	25	Right	Right-arm medium	(Bangladesh) Abahani Limited cricket team
29	Rumana Ahmed	29 May 1991 (aged 24)	26	Right	Leg break	(Bangladesh) Mohammedan Sporting Club cricket team
32	Nahida Akter	2 March 2000 (aged 16)	3	Right	Slow left-arm orthodox	Bangladesh Krira Shikkha Protishtan
69	Sharmin Akhter	31 December 1995 (aged 20)	8	Right		(Bangladesh) Abahani Limited cricket team
	Panna Ghosh	11 November 1989 (aged 26)	18	Right	Right-arm medium	(Bangladesh) AV Sporting Club
99	Farzana Hoque	19 March 1993 (aged 22)	23	Right		(Bangladesh) Rupali Bank Krira Parishad
10	Sanjida Islam	1 April 1996 (aged 19)	12	Right		(Bangladesh) Gulshan cricket team
9	Fahima Khatun	2 November 1992 (aged 23)	14	Right	Leg break	(Bangladesh) Khelaghar Samaj Kallyan Samity
3	Salma Khatun	1 October 1990 (aged 25)	26	Right	Right-arm off break	(Bangladesh) Mohammedan Sporting Club cricket team
30	Khadija Tul Kubra	30 January 1995 (aged 21)	16	Right	Right-arm off break	(Bangladesh) Gulshan cricket team
17	Lata Mondal	16 January 1993 (aged 23)	26	Right	Right-arm medium	(Bangladesh) Rupali Bank Krira Parishad
	Ritu Moni	5 February 1993 (aged 23)	13	Right	Right-arm medium	(Bangladesh) Khelaghar Samaj Kallyan Samity
33	Ayasha Rahman	14 January 1984 (aged 32)	16	Right		(Bangladesh) Mohammedan Sporting Club cricket team
	Shaila Sharmin	16 July 1989 (aged 26)	5	Right	Right-arm off break	(Bangladesh) Abahani Limited cricket team
1	Nigar Sultana (wk)	1 August 1997 (aged 18)	3	Right		(Bangladesh) Khelaghar Samaj Kallyan Samity

== England ==
On 17 February 2016, the England and Wales Cricket Board announced its squad.
Coach: Mark Robinson

No.	Player	Date of birth	T20I Matches	Batting	Bowling style	Domestic team
23	Charlotte Edwards (c)	17 December 1979 (aged 36)	90	Right	Leg break	(England) Kent
5	Heather Knight (v/c)	26 December 1990 (aged 25)	29	Right	Right-arm medium	(England) Berkshire
12	Tamsin Beaumont (wk)	11 March 1991 (aged 25)	36	Right		(England) Kent
26	Katherine Brunt	2 July 1985 (aged 30)	50	Right	Right-arm medium-fast	(England) Yorkshire
34	Georgia Elwiss	31 May 1991 (aged 24)	11	Right	Right-arm medium-fast	(England) Sussex
53	Natasha Farrant	29 May 1996 (aged 19)	8	Left	Left-arm medium	(England) Kent
20	Lydia Greenway	6 August 1985 (aged 30)	80	Left	Right-arm off break	(England) Kent
54	Rebecca Grundy	12 July 1990 (aged 25)	10	Left	Slow left-arm orthodox	(England) Warwickshire
24	Jenny Gunn	9 May 1986 (aged 29)	87	Right	Right-arm medium-fast	(England) Nottinghamshire
40	Amy Jones (wk)	13 June 1993 (aged 22)	12	Right		(England) Warwickshire
7	Laura Marsh^{1}	5 December 1986 (aged 29)	58	Right	Right-arm off break	(England) Kent
39	Natalie Sciver	20 August 1992 (aged 23)	29	Right	Right-arm medium	(England) Surrey
41	Anya Shrubsole	7 December 1991 (aged 24)	42	Right	Right-arm medium	(England) Somerset
30	Sarah Taylor (wk)	20 May 1989 (aged 26)	76	Right		(England) Sussex
28	Danni Wyatt	22 April 1991 (aged 24)	62	Right	Right-arm off break	(England) Nottinghamshire
Withdrawn players
17	Danielle Hazell^{1}	13 May 1988 (aged 27)	66	Right	Right-arm off break	(England) Yorkshire

^{1}On 22 March 2016, the England and Wales Cricket Board reported it was withdrawing Danielle Hazell, due to a calf injury and named Laura Marsh as replacement.

== India ==
On 5 February 2016, the Board of Control for Cricket in India announced its squad.
Coach: Purnima Rau

No.	Player	Date of birth	T20I Matches	Batting	Bowling style	Domestic team
3	Mithali Raj (c)	3 December 1982 (aged 33)	55	Right	Leg break	(India) Railways cricket team
25	Jhulan Goswami (v/c)	25 November 1982 (aged 33)	49	Right	Right-arm medium	(India) Bengal cricket team
8	Ekta Bisht	8 February 1986 (aged 30)	27	Left	Slow left-arm orthodox	(India) Railways cricket team
1	Rajeshwari Gayakwad	1 June 1991 (aged 24)	9	Right	Slow left-arm orthodox	(India) Karnataka cricket team
16	Thirush Kamini	30 July 1990 (aged 25)	3	Left	Leg break	(India) Railways cricket team
84	Harmanpreet Kaur	8 March 1989 (aged 27)	57	Right	Right-arm medium-fast	(India) Railways cricket team
79	Veda Krishnamurthy	16 October 1992 (aged 23)	26	Right	Leg break	(India) Karnataka cricket team
18	Smriti Mandhana	18 July 1996 (aged 19)	16	Left	Right-arm medium	(India) Maharashtra cricket team
99	Niranjana Nagarajan	9 October 1988 (aged 27)	14	Right	Right-arm medium	(India) Railways cricket team
12	Shikha Pandey	12 May 1989 (aged 26)	13	Right	Right-arm medium	(India) Goa cricket team
82	Anuja Patil	28 June 1992 (aged 23)	13	Right	Right-arm off break	(India) Maharashtra cricket team
6	Deepti Sharma	24 August 1997 (aged 18)	4	Left	Right-arm medium	(India) Uttar Pradesh cricket team
59	Vellaswamy Vanitha	19 July 1990 (aged 25)	11	Right	Right-arm medium	(India) Karnataka cricket team
5	Sushma Verma (wk)	3 November 1992 (aged 23)	11	Right		(India) Himachal Pradesh cricket team
24	Poonam Yadav	24 August 1991 (aged 24)	16	Right	Leg break	(India) Railways cricket team

== Ireland ==
On 19 January 2016, Cricket Ireland announced its squad.
Coach: (Australia) Aaron Hamilton

No.	Player	Date of birth	T20I Matches	Batting	Bowling style	Domestic team
33	Isobel Joyce (c)	25 July 1983 (aged 32)	35	Right	Left-arm medium	(Republic of Ireland) Merrion Cricket Club
	Catherine Dalton	24 October 1992 (aged 23)	1	Right	Right-arm fast	(England) Middlesex
14	Laura Delany	23 December 1992 (aged 23)	29	Right	Right-arm medium	(Republic of Ireland) Leinster Cricket Club
34	Kim Garth	25 April 1996 (aged 19)	21	Right	Right-arm fast	(Republic of Ireland) Pembroke Cricket Club
29	Jennifer Gray	30 April 1993 (aged 22)	4	Right	Right-arm medium	(Republic of Ireland) YMCA Cricket Club
44	Cecelia Joyce	25 July 1983 (aged 32)	28	Right	Leg break	(Republic of Ireland) Merrion Cricket Club
85	Shauna Kavanagh	21 April 1992 (aged 23)	14	Right	Right-arm medium	(Republic of Ireland) Pembroke Cricket Club
18	Amy Kenealy	6 April 1988 (aged 27)	15	Right	Right-arm medium	(Republic of Ireland) Leinster Cricket Club
66	Gaby Lewis	27 March 2001 (aged 14)	6	Right	Leg break	(Republic of Ireland) YMCA Cricket Club
88	Robyn Lewis	21 July 1999 (aged 16)	1	Right	Slow left-arm orthodox	(Republic of Ireland) YMCA Cricket Club
46	Kate McKenna	27 September 1989 (aged 26)	7	Right	Right-arm medium	(Republic of Ireland) Merrion Cricket Club
23	Ciara Metcalfe	29 September 1979 (aged 36)	9	Left	Leg break	(Republic of Ireland) Pembroke Cricket Club
99	Lucy O'Reilly	9 November 1999 (aged 16)	18	Right	Right-arm medium	(Republic of Ireland) YMCA Cricket Club
11	Clare Shillington	8 January 1981 (aged 35)	36	Right	Right-arm off break	(Republic of Ireland) YMCA Cricket Club
81	Mary Waldron (wk)	5 May 1984 (aged 31)	28	Right		(Republic of Ireland) Malahide Cricket Club

== New Zealand ==
On 3 February 2016, New Zealand Cricket announced its squad.
Coach: Haidee Tiffen

No.	Player	Date of birth	T20I Matches	Batting	Bowling style	Domestic team
23	Suzie Bates (c)	16 September 1987 (aged 28)	78	Right	Right-arm medium	(New Zealand) Otago Sparks
77	Sophie Devine (v/c)	1 September 1989 (aged 26)	54	Right	Right-arm medium	(New Zealand) Wellington Blaze
19	Erin Bermingham	18 April 1988 (aged 27)	24	Right	Leg break	(New Zealand) Canterbury Magicians
62	Leigh Kasperek	15 February 1992 (aged 24)	7	Right	Right-arm off break	(New Zealand) Otago Sparks
49	Felicity Leydon-Davis	22 June 1994 (aged 21)	8	Right	Right-arm medium	(New Zealand) Northern Districts Spirit
15	Katey Martin (wk)	7 February 1985 (aged 31)	42	Right		(New Zealand) Otago Sparks
28	Sara McGlashan (wk)	28 March 1982 (aged 33)	71	Right		(New Zealand) Auckland Hearts
99	Thamsyn Newton	3 June 1995 (aged 20)	5	Right	Right-arm medium	(New Zealand) Canterbury Magicians
54	Morna Nielsen	24 February 1990 (aged 26)	38	Right	Slow left-arm orthodox	(New Zealand) Otago Sparks
70	Katie Perkins	7 July 1988 (aged 27)	37	Right	Right-arm medium	(New Zealand) Auckland Hearts
52	Anna Peterson	12 September 1990 (aged 25)	7	Right	Right-arm medium	(New Zealand) Auckland Hearts
13	Rachel Priest (wk)	13 June 1985 (aged 30)	59	Right		(New Zealand) Wellington Blaze
74	Hannah Rowe	3 October 1996 (aged 19)	5	Right	Right-arm medium	(New Zealand) Central Districts Hinds
17	Amy Satterthwaite	7 October 1986 (aged 29)	66	Left	Right-arm medium	(New Zealand) Canterbury Magicians
6	Lea Tahuhu	23 September 1990 (aged 25)	20	Right	Right-arm medium-fast	(New Zealand) Canterbury Magicians

== Pakistan ==
On 10 February 2016, the Pakistan Cricket Board announced its squad.
Coach: Mohtashim Rasheed

No.	Player	Date of birth	T20I Matches	Batting	Bowling style	Domestic team
5	Sana Mir (c)	5 January 1986 (aged 30)	63	Right	Right-arm off break	(Pakistan) Zarai Taraqiati Bank Limited cricket team
18	Nain Abidi	23 May 1985 (aged 30)	57	Right		(Pakistan) Zarai Taraqiati Bank Limited cricket team
12	Muneeba Ali	8 August 1997 (aged 18)	0	Left		(Pakistan) Karachi cricket team
31	Sidra Ameen	7 April 1992 (aged 23)	9	Right	Right-arm medium-fast	(Pakistan) Omar Associates Cricket Club
46	Anam Amin	11 August 1992 (aged 23)	16	Right	Slow left-arm orthodox	(Pakistan) Lahore cricket team
	Diana Baig^{1}	15 October 1995 (aged 20)	1	Right	Right-arm medium	(Pakistan) Zarai Taraqiati Bank Limited cricket team
8	Nida Dar	2 January 1987 (aged 29)	58	Right	Right-arm off break	(Pakistan) Zarai Taraqiati Bank Limited cricket team
20	Asmavia Iqbal	1 January 1988 (aged 28)	58	Right	Right-arm medium-fast	(Pakistan) Omar Associates Cricket Club
88	Sadia Yousuf	4 November 1989 (aged 26)	38	Right	Slow left-arm orthodox	(Pakistan) Omar Associates Cricket Club
16	Iram Javed	16 December 1991 (aged 24)	12	Right	Right-arm medium-fast	(Pakistan) Omar Associates Cricket Club
7	Javeria Khan	14 May 1988 (aged 27)	54	Right	Right-arm off break	(Pakistan) Zarai Taraqiati Bank Limited cricket team
10	Nahida Khan	3 November 1986 (aged 29)	25	Right	Right-arm medium	(Pakistan) Zarai Taraqiati Bank Limited cricket team
3	Bismah Maroof	18 July 1991 (aged 24)	62	Left	Leg break	(Pakistan) Zarai Taraqiati Bank Limited cricket team
22	Sidra Nawaz (wk)	14 March 1994 (aged 22)	4	Right		Higher Education Commission of Pakistan
37	Aliya Riaz	24 August 1992 (aged 23)	8	Right	Right-arm off break	Higher Education Commission of Pakistan
Withdrawn players
33	Sania Khan^{1}	23 March 1985 (aged 30)	24	Right	Right-arm medium	(Pakistan) Zarai Taraqiati Bank Limited cricket team

^{1}On 9 March 2016, the Pakistan Cricket Board reported it was withdrawing Sania Khan due to a fractured thumb and named Diana Baig as replacement.

== South Africa ==
On 25 February 2016, Cricket South Africa announced its squad.
Coach: Hilton Moreeng

No.	Player	Date of birth	T20I Matches	Batting	Bowling style	Domestic team
22	Mignon du Preez (c)	13 June 1989 (aged 26)	61	Right		(South Africa) Northerns
8	Trisha Chetty (v/c) (wk)	26 June 1988 (aged 27)	62	Right		(South Africa) Gauteng
15	Moseline Daniels	1 February 1990 (aged 26)	22	Left	Left-arm medium	(South Africa) Boland
17	Dinesha Devnarain	12 November 1988 (aged 27)	16	Right	Right-arm medium	(South Africa) KZN Coastal
21	Yolani Fourie	12 October 1989 (aged 26)	7	Right	Right-arm off break	(South Africa) Gauteng
89	Shabnim Ismail	5 October 1988 (aged 27)	54	Left	Right-arm fast-medium	(South Africa) Gauteng
7	Marizanne Kapp	4 January 1990 (aged 26)	46	Right	Right-arm medium	(South Africa) Eastern Province
99	Ayabonga Khaka	18 July 1992 (aged 23)	8	Right	Right-arm medium	(South Africa) Border
	Odine Kirsten	28 July 1994 (aged 21)	2	Right	Right-arm medium	(South Africa) Northerns
5	Masabata Klaas	3 February 1991 (aged 25)	9	Right	Right-arm medium	(South Africa) Free State
67	Lizelle Lee	2 April 1992 (aged 23)	33	Right	Right-arm medium-fast	(South Africa) North West
11	Marcia Letsoalo	11 April 1984 (aged 31)	44	Right	Right-arm medium	(South Africa) Northerns
96	Suné Luus	5 January 1996 (aged 20)	32	Right	Leg break	(South Africa) Northerns
81	Dane van Niekerk	14 May 1993 (aged 22)	53	Right	Leg break	(South Africa) Eastern Province
25	Chloe Tryon	25 January 1994 (aged 22)	29	Right	Left-arm medium-fast	(South Africa) KZN Coastal

== Sri Lanka ==
On 9 February 2016, Sri Lanka Cricket announced its squad.
Coach: Lanka de Silva

No.	Player	Date of birth	T20I Matches	Batting	Bowling style	Domestic team
14	Shashikala Siriwardene (c)	14 February 1985 (aged 31)	48	Right	Right-arm off break	(Sri Lanka) Navy Sports Club
58	Chamari Atapattu (v/c)	9 February 1990 (aged 26)	50	Left	Right-arm medium	(Sri Lanka) Air Force Sports Club
25	Nipuni Hansika	3 August 1994 (aged 21)	10	Left	Right-arm medium-fast	(Sri Lanka) Army Sports Club
97	Ama Kanchana	7 April 1991 (aged 24)	11	Right	Right-arm fast-medium	(Sri Lanka) Air Force Sports Club
36	Hansima Karunaratne	4 October 1993 (aged 22)	3	Right	Right-arm medium	(Sri Lanka) Colts Cricket Club
91	Sugandika Kumari	5 October 1990 (aged 25)	12	Left	Slow left-arm orthodox	(Sri Lanka) Army Sports Club
3	Eshani Lokusuriyage	1 June 1984 (aged 31)	52	Right	Right-arm medium	(Sri Lanka) Navy Sports Club
	Harshitha Madavi	29 June 1998 (aged 17)	0	Left	Right-arm slow-medium	(Sri Lanka) Colts Cricket Club
5	Dilani Manodara (wk)	8 December 1982 (aged 33)	44	Right		(Sri Lanka) Air Force Sports Club
23	Yasoda Mendis	15 September 1986 (aged 29)	33	Right	Right-arm medium	(Sri Lanka) Air Force Sports Club
55	Udeshika Prabodani	20 September 1985 (aged 30)	41	Right	Left-arm medium	(Sri Lanka) Navy Sports Club
86	Oshadi Ranasinghe	16 March 1986 (aged 29)	14	Left	Right-arm medium-fast	(Sri Lanka) Air Force Sports Club
18	Inoka Ranaweera	18 February 1986 (aged 30)	24	Left	Slow left-arm orthodox	(Sri Lanka) Navy Sports Club
9	Nilakshi de Silva	27 September 1989 (aged 26)	9	Right	Right-arm slow-medium	(Sri Lanka) Army Sports Club
87	Prasadini Weerakkody (wk)	13 November 1988 (aged 27)	17	Left		(Sri Lanka) Navy Sports Club

== West Indies ==
On 13 January 2016, the West Indies Cricket Board announced its squad.
Coach: (Barbados) Vasbert Drakes

No.	Player	Date of birth	T20I Matches	Batting	Bowling style	Domestic team
7	Stafanie Taylor (c)	11 June 1991 (aged 24)	68	Right	Right-arm off break	Jamaica
4	Shakera Selman (v/c)	1 September 1989 (aged 26)	59	Right	Right-arm medium	Barbados
11	Merissa Aguilleira (wk)	14 December 1985 (aged 30)	73	Right		Trinidad and Tobago
30	Shemaine Campbelle	14 October 1992 (aged 23)	72	Right	Right-arm medium-fast	Guyana
46	Shamilia Connell	14 July 1992 (aged 23)	10	Right	Right-arm fast	Barbados
35	Britney Cooper	23 August 1989 (aged 26)	41	Right	Right-arm fast-medium	Trinidad and Tobago
5	Deandra Dottin	21 June 1991 (aged 24)	82	Right	Right-arm fast-medium	Barbados
9	Afy Fletcher	17 March 1987 (aged 28)	7	Right	Right-arm off break	Windward Islands
15	Stacy-Ann King	17 July 1983 (aged 32)	70	Left	Left-arm medium	Trinidad and Tobago
42	Kycia Knight (wk)	19 February 1992 (aged 24)	33	Left		Barbados
47	Kyshona Knight	19 February 1992 (aged 24)	25	Left	Right-arm medium	Barbados
50	Hayley Matthews	19 March 1998 (aged 17)	13	Right	Right-arm off break	Barbados
14	Anisa Mohammed	7 September 1988 (aged 27)	80	Right	Right-arm off break	Trinidad and Tobago
43	Shaquana Quintyne	3 January 1996 (aged 20)	36	Right	Leg break	Barbados
33	Tremayne Smartt	17 September 1985 (aged 30)	56	Right	Right-arm medium	Guyana
