= George McVeagh =

Irish sportsman (1906–1968)

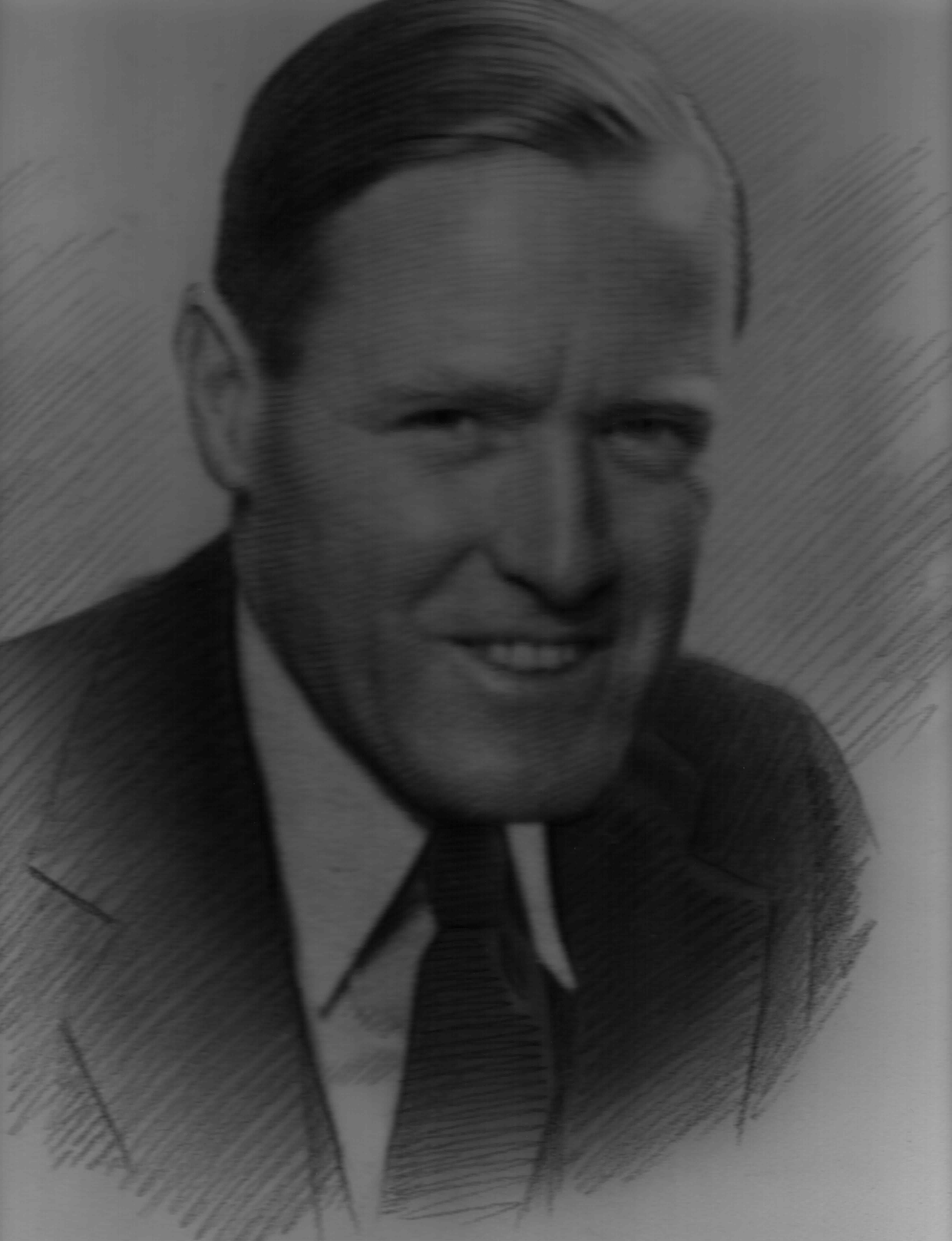
- Full name: Trevor George Brooke McVeagh
- Country (sports): Ireland
- Born: 14 September 1906 Drewstown House, Athboy, County Meath, Ireland
- Died: 5 June 1968 (aged 61) Dublin, Ireland
- Turned pro: 1925
- Retired: June 1960
- Plays: Left-handed

Singles
- Career record: 58–48
- Career titles: 11

George McVeagh, also known as Trevor McVeagh and T. G. McVeagh, (14 September 1906 – 5 June 1968) was an Irish sportsman who was capped in four sports for his country as a cricket, hockey, tennis, and squash player. He is considered the greatest all-round sportsman of his day in Ireland.

== Early life ==
Trevor McVeagh was born on 14 September 1906 in Drewstown House, Athboy, County Meath. His father, George Joseph Brooke McVeagh, was a landowner and local magistrate serving as the High Sheriff of Meath in 1891. His mother, Grace Alice Maude, was a daughter of a British army lieutenant-general Charles Annesley Benson.

The family had a strong cricketing background. His great-grandfather, Ferdinand, was one of the founders of Phoenix Cricket Club and his father had his own cricket ground at Athboy. His elder sister Stella was capped for Ireland at hockey and her son, Donald Pratt, became a notable cricketer and all-rounder.

According to the 1911 census, McVeagh family had 3 sons (Ferdinand, Montague and Trevor) and 3 daughters (Marjorie, Stella and Ivy), with Trevor being the youngest child in the family.

McVeagh was intended for Harrow School and Cambridge University, but he was sent instead to St Columba's College and Trinity College due to a downturn in the family's fortunes.

== Sports career ==
=== Cricket ===
McVeagh played cricket as a batsman for St Columba's, Trinity College, Phoenix Cricket Club and Ireland in the 1920s and 1930s.

At Trinity College he captained Dublin University Cricket Club from 1925 to 1930. McVeagh scored 3 centuries in succession for DUCC and led the team to the Leinster Senior League title in 1927.

He scored 3,282 runs for Trinity, including nine centuries. Four of those came in 1927 when he won the Marchant Cup.

McVeagh was capped for the Irish cricket team in 1926 and played a major role in 1928 in Ireland's historic victory over the touring West Indies, still the only time Ireland have recorded a first-class victory over a touring team.

During the 1930s, having left University, he played cricket both for the Phoenix Cricket Club and the national team, but because of his new profession as a solicitor and his commitment to tennis, he was an irregular player for both. He represented Ireland 20 times from 1926 to 1935 and once in 1938, and his career batting average was the highest achieved for an Irish player until the 1980s. McVeagh made 67 appearances for Phoenix, the last as late as 1957, when he had not played a competitive match for 15 years. He totalled 1613 runs for the club in League and Cup at 27.33, hitting three centuries. He also helped the team to win Leinster Senior Cup for three consecutive years in 1937–1939.

McVeagh was the President of the Irish Cricket Union in 1957 and 1958. His last recorded cricket match was in June 1960 when he played for St Columba's College team.

=== Tennis ===
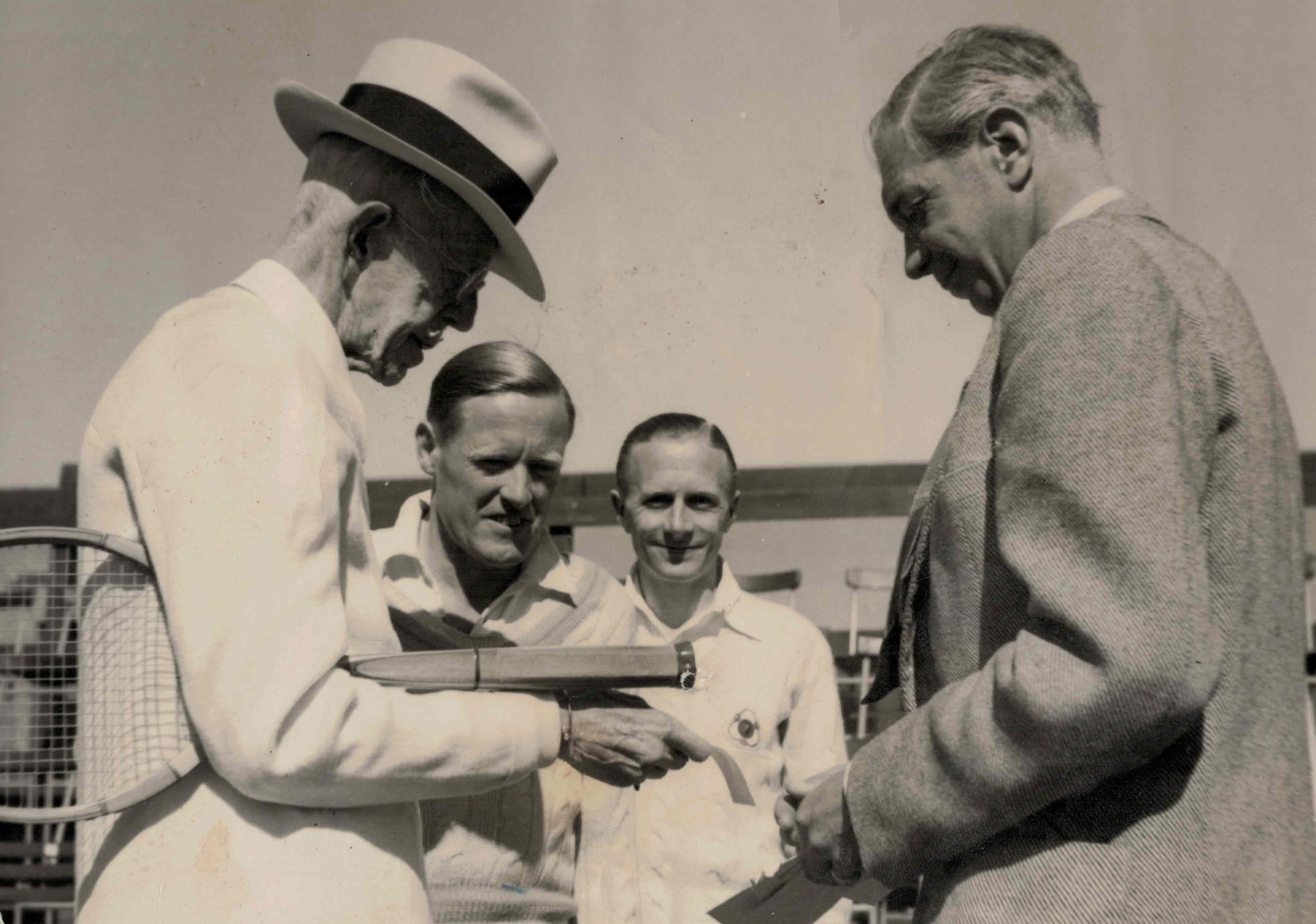
1946 Irish Davis Cup team (from left to right): Gustaf V of Sweden, George McVeagh, Raymond Egan, Curt Östberg. Photo taken in Stockholm by an unknown author. The image comes from McVeagh family archive.

McVeagh started playing tennis in his mid-twenties. At Trinity College he played with Shaun Jeffares and together they defeated University of Cambridge team. He also captained the Trinity Lawn Tennis Club.

From the mid-1930s onwards, tennis replaced cricket as his main summer sport. He represented Ireland in the Davis Cup 1933–1938 and 1946–1948. He also played at the Irish Open (known at that time as the Irish Lawn Tennis Championships).

In 1933 The Manchester Guardian praised McVeagh as "perhaps the most improved player of the year". Notable in this period was a series he played against legendary American player Bill Tilden in London where he won 2 out of 3 practice matches against the professional. He was known for an "unorthodox style of play… supplemented by his excellent ball skills and limitless energy and stamina in the game".

McVeagh was at the peak of his tennis career in 1936 when Irish Davis Cup team reached the European zone semi-finals. McVeagh, playing with George Lyttleton Rogers first defeated Sweden then Switzerland. On May 14, McVeagh gave Ireland a two-to-one lead over Sweden defeating Curt Östberg in the second round. On June 5, McVeagh and George Lyttleton Rogers defeated Hector Fisher and William Steiner taking a two-to-one lead over Switzerland in the third round. On June 6, after a surprising defeat of George Lyttleton-Rogers by Fisher, McVeagh managed to defeat Max Ellmer to carry Ireland into the semi-final. It was the first and only time that Ireland reached the European zone semi-finals. However, the Irish duo was defeated in Berlin on June 12 by Gottfried von Cramm and Heiner Henkel.

In summer 1936 McVeagh played for Ireland at Wimbledon with B. T. Leader and lost to Kay Lund of Germany and Enrique Maier of Spain. At mixed doubles he played with Hilda Wallis against the American duo of Don Budge and Sarah Palfrey Cooke.

In May 1937, George Lyttleton-Rogers and McVeagh played at Davis Cup in Montreux and were defeated by a Swiss team. In June, at Wimbledon they were defeated by the American players Charles Harris and Hal Surface. and by George Patrick Hughes and C.R.D. Tuckey. At mixed doubles he played with Miss Thomson against Norman Farquharson and Kay Stammers and lost.

In 1938 McVeagh was defeated by Vanni Canapele from Italy in the first round of the Davis Cup in Dublin at singles. At doubles, McVeagh and George Lyttleton-Rogers lost to Ferruccio Quintavalle and Valentino Taroni.

In February 1946, McVeagh was appointed non-playing captain of the Irish Davis Cup team. He returned to the team in 1948 winning at doubles at age forty-two. In 1950, at the age of 43, he won the Fitzwilliam Championship held at Fitzwilliam Lawn Tennis Club. In the late 1950s he also held the Presidency of Fitzwilliam LTC.

=== Squash ===
McVeagh was an Irish squash champion in the three years 1935–1937 and played on Ireland's first squash international team in the latter year; Ireland lost 4–1 to Scotland, McVeagh being the only Irish winner.

=== Hockey ===
McVeagh was capped for Ireland hockey team in 1932 when he played for the Three Rock Rovers Hockey Club. He then played 24 internationals as a left-wing forward and captained the Irish teams that won three Triple Crown (an unofficial title "awarded" to the team that beat all three of the other home nations in the same season) in a row in 1937–39. He played for the Britain and Ireland European Championship-winning team in 1935. McVeagh also helped Dublin University Hockey Club to win the Irish Senior Cup in 1947.

== Professional career ==
As a solicitor, McVeagh served his apprenticeship with John George Oulton. McVeagh was admitted in Hilary sittings 1931 and practiced as senior partner in the firm of Messrs T.G. McVeagh & Co., 32-22 Kildare Street, Dublin. His practice was very successful and he counted Aga Khan, Sir Oswald Mosley and Edward McGuire as clients.

== Death ==
McVeagh died in Dublin on 5 June 1968 from a heart attack, following a game of tennis at Fitzwilliam Lawn Tennis Club with Cyril Kemp. He was practicing for his annual visit to Wimbledon to play in the Veterans Tournament. After a game, he took a shower, then collapsed, dying almost instantly.

== Personal life ==
George McVeagh had married Margaret Trainor in 1947 and they had two children, Hilary and Trevor.

== Bibliography ==
- McRedmond, Louis, ed. (1996). Modern Irish lives: dictionary of 20th-century Irish biography. Palgrave Macmillan. p. 204. ISBN 9780312164782.
- Siggins, Gerald; Fitzgerald, James, eds. (2006). Ireland's 100 Cricket Greats. The History Press. pp. 118–119. ISBN 9781845885649.
