= Leinster Senior League Cup (cricket) =

The Leinster Senior Cup is the most important provincial cricket knock-out cup of the Leinster jurisdiction in Ireland. The competition was renamed as the Leinster Senior League Cup between 2020 and 2022.

Traditionally a knock-out competition, from 2019 it has been played in a group format, with the winners and runners-up of two groups qualifying for semi-finals. In 2021, it was played as a T20 competition.

== List of finals ==
=== 1930s ===
Season	Winners	Runners-up	Match Scores
1935	Pembroke	Phoenix	
1936	Leinster	Merrion	
1937	Phoenix	Dublin University	
1938	Phoenix	Dublin University	
1939	Phoenix	Leinster	

=== 1940s ===
Season	Winners	Runners-up	Match Scores
1940	Merrion	Leinster	
1941	Leinster	Dublin University	
1942	Dublin University	Phoenix	
1943	Clontarf	Pembroke	
1944	Pembroke	Merrion	
1945	Phoenix	Pembroke	
1946	Pembroke	Merrion	
1947	Phoenix	Clontarf	
1948	Phoenix	Merrion	
1949	Phoenix	Railway Union	

=== 1950s ===
Season	Winners	Runners-up	Match Scores
1950	Clontarf	Railway Union	
1951	Phoenix	Merrion	
1952	Dublin University	Clontarf	
1953	Leinster	Malahide	
1954	Pembroke	Dublin University	
1955	Leinster	Malahide	
1956	Leinster	Phoenix	
1957	Pembroke	Leinster	
1958	Leinster	Phoenix	
1959	Malahide	Leinster	

=== 1960s ===
Season	Winners	Runners-up	Match scores
1960	Merrion	Clontarf	
1961	Dublin University	Railway Union	
1962	Dublin University	Pembroke	
1963	Dublin University	Merrion	
1964	Old Belvedere	Malahide	
1965	Old Belvedere	Malahide	
1966	Old Belvedere	Malahide	
1967	Railway Union	Phoenix	
1968	Leinster	Clontarf	
1969	Clontarf	Phoenix	

=== 1970s ===
Season	Winners	Runners-up	Match Scores
1970	Old Belvedere	Clontarf	
1971	Malahide	Clontarf	
1972	Pembroke	Malahide	
1973	Phoenix	Pembroke	
1974	Pembroke	Railway Union	
1975	Phoenix	Leinster	
1976	Phoenix	Leinster	
1977	Phoenix	Old Belvedere	
1978	Phoenix	Merrion	
1979	Phoenix	?	

=== 1980s ===
Season	Winners	Runners-up	Match Scores
1980	Pembroke	YMCA	
1981	Leinster	Railway Union	
1982	Phoenix	Malahide	
1983	Pembroke	Leinster	
1984	YMCA	Leinster	
1985	Leinster	Merrion	
1986	YMCA	Phoenix	
1987	YMCA	Clontarf	
1988	YMCA	Railway Union	
1989	The Hills	Carlisle	

=== 1990s ===
Season	Winners	Runners-up	Match scores
1990	YMCA	Clontarf	
1991	YMCA	Leinster	
1992	Clontarf	YMCA	
1993	Pembroke	Old Belvedere	
1994	YMCA	Malahide	
1995	Clontarf	Merrion	
1996	The Hills	Pembroke	
1997	Pembroke	The Hills	
1998	Leinster	Malahide	
1999	Pembroke	The Hills	

=== 2000s ===
Season	Winners	Runners-up	Match Scores
2000	Clontarf	North County	
2001	YMCA	Terenure	
2002	YMCA	Merrion	
2003	North County	Clontarf	
2004	Clontarf	Rush	
2005	The Hills	Clontarf	
2006	The Hills	North County	
2007	Clontarf	Merrion	
2008	Clontarf	North County	
2009	Clontarf	North County	

=== 2010s ===
Season	Winners	Runners-up	Match Scores
2010	Railway Union	Clontarf	
2011	Merrion	North County	
2012	Clontarf	Pembroke	Pembroke 236–8 (60.0 overs, T Lawson 79, A Balbirnie 57*, G Baugh 45, A Cusack 3–45); Clontarf 238–4 (55.5 overs, B Coghlan 62, A Poynter 56*, M Watterson 53, A Eastwood 2–38, A Leonard 2–58); Clontarf won by 6 wickets
2013	YMCA	Pembroke	YMCA 288-6 (60.0 overs, J Bray 130*, T Johnston 62, B McCarthy 2-61); Pembroke 209 (55.4 overs, B McCarthy 45, T Lawson 35, R Russell 28, A van der Merwe 4-39, Simmi Singh 3-35, Yacoub Ali 2-45); YMCA won by 79 runs
2014	Clontarf	Malahide	Clontarf 215 (Delany 57, Savile 5/40, B McCarthy 2-61); Malahide 171 (Strydom 48, Der Merwe 2/27, Morrissey 4/41, D'Arcy 3/38); Clontarf won by 44 runs
2015	Clontarf	YMCA	YMCA 204 (S McAuley 40, M Granger 5/38); Clontarf 208-2 (A D'Arcy 88no, B Coghlan 53); Clontarf won by 8 wickets
2016	YMCA	Leinster	Leinster 225-8 (Coad 24, Delany 27, Dockrell 70, O'Dwyer 33, Singh 5/57); YMCA 226-3 (49.2 overs) (Tector 75, Singh 66, Terry 58no); YMCA won by 7 wickets
2017	The Hills	Merrion	Merrion 186 (Anderson 80, Lewis 22, Tice 41; Cartwright 4/30); The Hills 188-5 (37.4 overs) (McLoughlin-Gavin 38, Shah 25, Sorensen 64no; Kane 3/29); The Hills won by 5 wickets
2018	Clontarf	North County	Clontarf 192-8 (Gallagher 22, Poynter 36, Forrest 66, Islam 35; Sheridan 3/27, Nofal 4/8); North County 175 (Grassi 32, McGovern 58; Poynter 3/24); Clontarf won by 17 runs
2019	The Hills	Phoenix	

=== 2020s ===
Season	Winners	Runners-up	Match Scores
2020	YMCA	Railway Union	
2021	Merrion	YMCA	
2022	Pembroke	Clontarf	
2023	Clontarf	The Hills	
2024	Pembroke	Phoenix	
2025	Pembroke	Clontarf	
2026	Pembroke	Leinster	

== Summary of winners ==
Team	Wins
Pembroke	16
Phoenix	15
Clontarf	15
YMCA	12
Leinster	10
The Hills	6
Dublin University	5
Merrion	4
Old Belvedere	4
Malahide	2
Railway Union	2
North County	1

== See also ==
- Leinster Senior League
- NCU Challenge Cup
