= Old Belvedere Cricket Club =

Former cricket club in Dublin, Ireland

- Cabra Oval
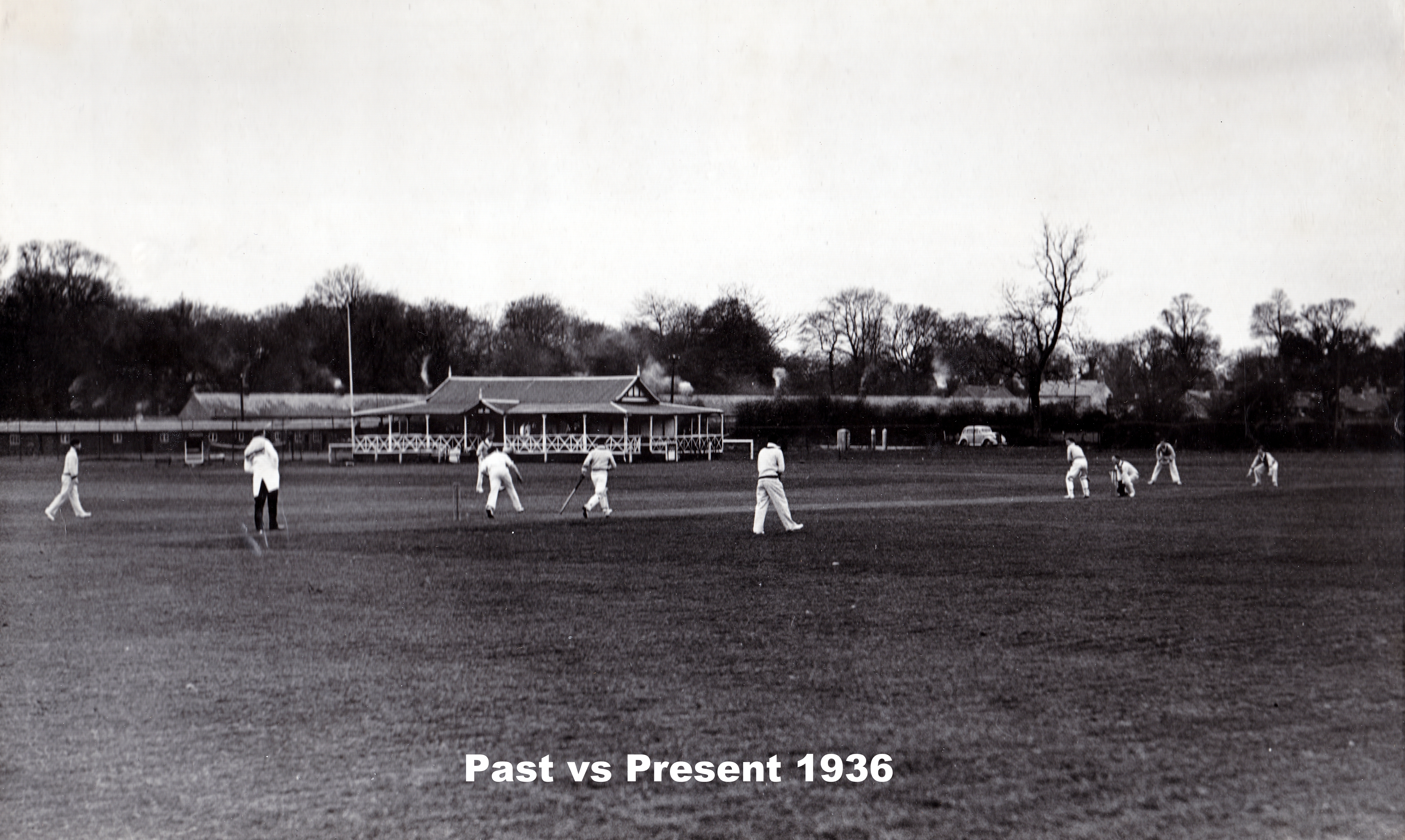
- Cabra Oval
- Location: Navan Road, Dublin
- Country: Ireland
- Home club: Old Belvedere CC
- Establishment: 1950
- Owner: Belvedere College
- Last used: September 2012

Old Belvedere Cricket Club was a cricket club in Dublin, Ireland, that played in the Leinster Senior League. The club was founded in 1950 and promoted to the Senior League in 1957. The club ceased to exist in 2012 when it withdrew from the league.

The club was established in 1950 by past pupils of Belvedere College. It was the only club in Ireland capable of hosting two matches simultaneously, as there were two full pitches on the ground. The ground at the Navan Road, known as the Cabra Oval, is owned by Belvedere College. The college continues to play cricket there.

== Major honours ==
The team won the Leinster Senior League twice (1974 and 1976) and the Leinster Senior Cup four times (1964, 1965, 1966 and 1970).

== International players ==
- Owen Butler
- Ray D. Daly
- John J. McDevitt
- John A. Prior
- Peter M. O'Reilly
- Alec O'Riordan
- Robin Waters

== Notable coaches ==
Fr. Ger Brangan S.J. persuaded coaches to come over from the UK and run sessions in the nets in Jones Road. Among them were Charlie Hallows, Cec Pepper, Victor Cannings and Frank Worrell.

In later years coaching was continued on by Robin Waters.

== Club records ==
- 200 runs and 20 wickets in a season: A. O'Riordan (17 times)
- Hat tricks: A. O'Riordan (2)
- Fifty wickets in a season: A. O'Riordan (4 times)
- Five wickets in an innings: A. O'Riordan (65 times, including 9 with 5 in succession in 1964)
- Best bowling analysis: D. Williams 8/15 Carlisle, Cabra, 1971
- 500 runs in a season: A. O'Riordan (5 times), best 678 (1965)
- Senior centuries scored: A. O'Riordan, 9 centuries, highest 178 v Leinster Rathmines, 1969
- Most successive matches: T. O'Brien: 124
- Best wicket keeping: P. Tynan 6 Catches v. Dublin University 1965; S. O'Gorman 5 Catches and 1 Stumping v. Phoenix 1984
