= Australia women's cricket team in Ireland in 2015 =

International cricket tour

Australian women's cricket team in Ireland in 2015
| | Ireland | Australia |
- Dates: 19 – 22 August 2015
| Captains | Isobel Joyce | Meg Lanning |

Twenty20 International series
- Results: Australia won the 3-match series 3–0
| Most runs | Kim Garth (60) | Elyse Villani (126) |
| Most wickets | Elena Tice (3); Kim Garth (3) | Jess Jonassen (5) |
- Player of the series: Grace Harris (Aus)

The Australian women's cricket team toured Ireland in 2015. A scheduled break between the Test and Twenty20 International (T20I) matches against England during the Women's Ashes allowed Australia to travel and play a three T20I match series against Ireland between 19 and 22 August. Australia won all three matches and the series with Grace Harris being named player of the series.

== Squads ==
T20Is
| Ireland | Australia |
|---|---|
| Isobel Joyce (c); Laura Delany; Kim Garth; Cecelia Joyce; Shauna Kavanagh; Amy Kenealy; Gaby Lewis; Robyn Lewis; Louise McCarthy; Ciara Metcalfe; Lucy O'Reilly; Clare Shillington; Elena Tice; Mary Waldron (wk) | Meg Lanning (c); Alex Blackwell (vc); Kristen Beams; Nicole Bolton; Jess Cameron; Sarah Coyte; Rene Farrell; Holly Ferling; Grace Harris; Alyssa Healy (wk); Jess Jonassen; Erin Osborne; Ellyse Perry; Megan Schutt; Elyse Villani |

== T20I series ==
=== 1st T20I ===
19 August
15:30 (UTC)
Scorecard

| Australia; 140/5 (20 overs) | v | Ireland; 115/8 (20 overs) |
| Meg Lanning 43 (38); Elena Tice 2/35 (4 overs) | | Cecelia Joyce 26 (25); Grace Harris 2/15 (3 overs) |

Australia won by 25 runs
Claremont Road Cricket Ground, Dublin
Umpires: Azam Ali Baig and Gordon Black

- Ireland won the toss and elected to field.
- Grace Harris (Aus) made her T20I debut.

=== 2nd T20I ===
21 August
15:30 (UTC)
Scorecard

| Australia; 131/6 (20 overs) | v | Ireland; 76/7 (20 overs) |
| Ellyse Perry 39 (32); Kim Garth 3/17 (4 overs) | | Isobel Joyce 24 (29); Jess Jonassen 2/8 (4 overs) |

Australia won by 55 runs
Claremont Road Cricket Ground, Dublin
Umpires: Kevin Gallagher and Martin Block (Eng)

- Australia won the toss and elected to bat.

=== 3rd T20I ===
22 August
11:00 (UTC)
Scorecard

| Australia; 186/1 (20 overs) | v | Ireland; 87/7 (20 overs) |
| Elyse Villani 80 (53); Elena Tice 1/24 (3 overs) | | Kim Garth 30* (35); Jess Jonassen 2/7 (4 overs) |

Australia won by 99 runs
Claremont Road Cricket Ground, Dublin
Umpires: Azam Ali Baig and Clive Colloran

- Australia won the toss and elected to bat.

== Statistics ==
=== Batting ===
Most runs

| Player | Team | Mat | Runs | Avg | Highest | SR | 100 | 50 |
|---|---|---|---|---|---|---|---|---|
| Elyse Villani | Australia | 3 | 126 | 42.00 | 80 | 135.48 | 0 | 1 |
| Ellyse Perry | Australia | 3 | 111 | 55.50 | 55* | 115.62 | 0 | 1 |
| Kim Garth | Ireland | 3 | 60 | 60.00 | 30* | 90.90 | 0 | 0 |
| Grace Harris | Australia | 3 | 58 | 58.00 | 39* | 193.33 | 0 | 0 |
| Meg Lanning | Australia | 3 | 55 | 27.50 | 43 | 114.58 | 0 | 0 |

=== Bowling ===
Most wickets

| Player | Team | Mat | Wkts | Runs | Avg | BBI | 4 | 5 |
|---|---|---|---|---|---|---|---|---|
| Jess Jonassen | Australia | 3 | 5 | 37 | 7.40 | 2/7 | 0 | 0 |
| Grace Harris | Australia | 3 | 3 | 48 | 16.00 | 2/15 | 0 | 0 |
| Elena Tice | Ireland | 3 | 3 | 59 | 19.66 | 2/35 | 0 | 0 |
| Kim Garth | Ireland | 3 | 3 | 66 | 22.00 | 3/17 | 0 | 0 |
| Rene Farrell | Australia | 2 | 2 | 27 | 13.50 | 1/12 | 0 | 0 |
