= Alec O'Riordan =

Irish cricketer and cricket administrator

Personal information
- Full name: Alec John O'Riordan
- Born: 26 July 1940 (age 86); Clontarf, Ireland
- Batting: Right-handed
- Bowling: Left-arm fast-medium

Domestic team information
- Years: Team
- 1958–1977: Ireland

Career statistics
Competition	First-class
Matches	25
Runs scored	614
Batting average	15.74
100s/50s	1/2
Top score	117
Balls bowled	4,498
Wickets	75
Bowling average	21.38
5 wickets in innings	2
10 wickets in match	0
Best bowling	6/35
Catches/stumpings	19/–
- Source: Cricinfo, 22 October 2018

Alec John O'Riordan (born 26 July 1940) is a former Irish first-class cricketer.

== Life ==
=== Early life ===
O'Riordan was born in the Dublin suburb of Clontarf. He was educated at Belvedere College, before going up to University College Dublin.

=== Cricket playing career ===
Considered one of the greatest cricketers to have played for Ireland, he played his club cricket for Clontarf and Old Belvedere, O'Riordan made his debut in first-class cricket for Ireland against the Marylebone Cricket Club (MCC) at Dublin in 1958.

He played first-class cricket for Ireland 25 times from 1958–1977. An all rounder, he scored 614 runs at an average of 15.74. His only first-class century, a score of 117, came against Scotland in 1976. With his fast-medium bowling, O'Riordan took 75 wickets at a bowling average of 21.38. His best innings bowling figures, one of two five wicket hauls he would take, saw him claim 6/35 against the MCC in 1966. An able fielder, he also took 19 catches. Including minor matches, O'Riordan took 206 wickets and scored 2,018 runs for Ireland, until this record was surpassed by Kyle McCallan. He captained Ireland on 28 occasions.

In 1969, when Ireland won a famous fixture against the touring West Indies team, O'Riordan took 4/18 as the West Indies were bowled out for 25, bowling through the entire innings with Douglas Goodwin. He then scored 35 as Ireland batted on after overhauling the West Indies total.

He continued to play club cricket for just over a decade following his final first-class match for Ireland, scoring 10,705 runs and taking 849 wickets at club level.

=== Cricket administration ===
He served as a national team selector. He was also president of the Irish Cricket Union.

=== Personal life ===
Outside of cricket, he worked as a consulting engineer. His wife, Geraldine Hannigan, is a former presenter on RTÉ.
