= Pakistan women's national cricket team record by opponent =

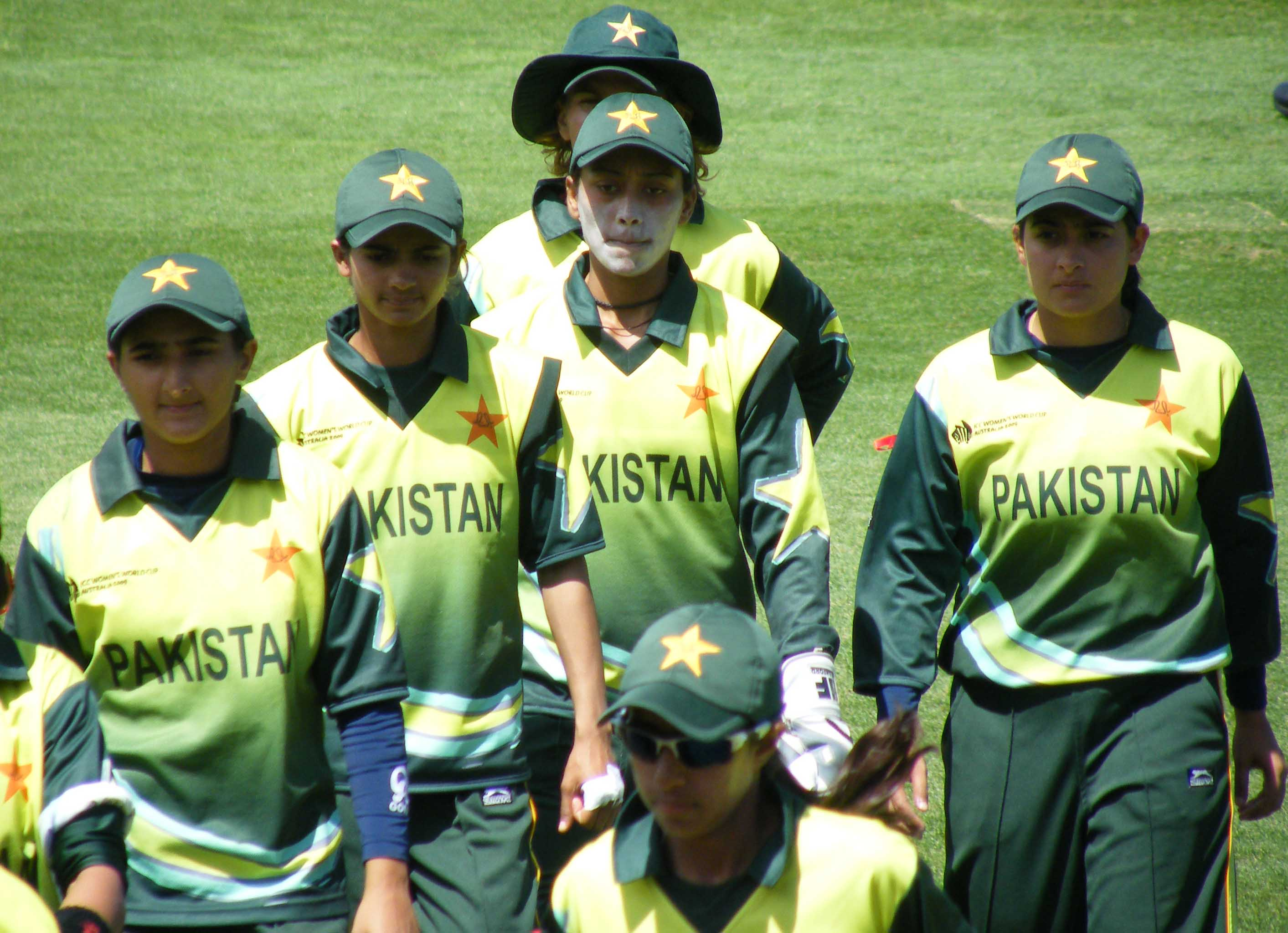
Members of the Pakistan women's cricket team at the 2009 ICC Women's World Twenty20 in Sydney.

The Pakistan women's national cricket team represents Pakistan in international cricket and is a full member of the International Cricket Council (ICC) with Test and One Day International (ODI) status. They first competed in international cricket in 1997 when they played an ODI against New Zealand. Pakistan lost the match by 10 wickets. They recorded their first ODI win against the Netherlands, in April 2001 at the National Stadium. As of 2026, Pakistan has played 233 ODI matches; they have won 70 matches and lost 153 matches, whilst 7 had no result. They have faced 15 teams in ODI cricket, with their most frequent opponent being West Indies, playing 38 matches against them. They have lost to West Indies in 27 matches. Pakistan has participated in six editions of the Women's Cricket World Cup: 1997, 2009, 2013, 2017, 2022 and 2025. In the 2009 edition, they defeated Sri Lanka in the group stage match by 57 runs. They also defeated West Indies in the "Super Six" match by four wickets, and finished at sixth losing in the fifth place playoff to the same team by three wickets.

Pakistan played their first Test match against Sri Lanka in April 1998, a match they lost by 309 runs. They have played three Test matches against three different opponents: Ireland, Sri Lanka and West Indies. As of 2026, Pakistan has played 205 Twenty20 International (T20I) matches since their first such contest in 2009 against Ireland, winning 81 matches and losing 116; they also tied three matches, whilst five had no result. They have competed against 17 different opponents, and their first win in the format came against Ireland at the Vineyard in May 2009. The team has played most frequently against South Africa, in 28 matches, and defeated them in 12 matches. Pakistan has participated in all the editions of the ICC Women's World Twenty20. They lost all of their games in 2009 and 2010 editions, and in the 2012 edition, they registered their solitary win over India. Pakistan lost the final of the 2012 Women's Twenty20 Asia Cup to India by 18 runs. In the 2014 ICC Women's World Twenty20, Pakistan finished at seventh place defeating Sri Lanka by 14 runs in the playoffs.

== Key ==
- M – Denotes the number of matches played
- W – Denotes the number of wins for Pakistan against the listed opponent
- L – Denotes the number of losses for Pakistan against the listed opponent
- T – Denotes the number of ties between Pakistan and the listed opponent
- D – Denotes the number of draws between Pakistan and the listed opponent
- NR – Denotes the number of no results between Pakistan and the listed opponent
- Win% – Win percentage (in ODI and T20I cricket, a tie counts as half a win, and no results are disregarded)
- Loss% – Loss percentage
- Draw% – Draw percentage
- First – Year of the first match between Pakistan and the listed opponent
- Last – Year of the latest match between Pakistan and the listed opponent

== Test cricket ==
Pakistan women Test cricket record by opponent
Opponent	M	W	L	T	D	Win%	Loss%	Draw%	First	Last
Ireland	1	0	1	0	0	0.00	100.00	0.00	2000	2000
Sri Lanka	1	0	1	0	0	0.00	100.00	0.00	1998	1998
West Indies	1	0	0	0	1	0.00	0.00	100.00	2004	2004
Total	3	0	2	0	1	0.00	66.66	33.33	1998	2004

== One Day International ==
Pakistan women One Day International record by opponent
Opponent	M	W	L	T	NR	Win%	First	Last
Australia	17	0	17	0	0	0.00	1997	2025
Bangladesh	17	8	8	1	0	47.06	2012	2025
Denmark	1	0	1	0	0	0.00	1997	1997
England	16	0	13	0	3	0.00	1997	2025
India	12	0	12	0	0	0.00	2005	2025
Ireland	22	16	6	0	0	72.73	1997	2025
Japan	1	1	0	0	0	100.00	2003	2003
Netherlands	12	7	4	0	1	58.33	2001	2011
New Zealand	18	1	15	1	1	0.05	2010	2025
Scotland	2	2	0	0	0	100.00	2003	2025
South Africa	35	7	26	1	1	20.00	1997	2026
Sri Lanka	37	12	24	0	1	32.43	1998	2026
Thailand	1	1	0	0	0	100.00	2025	2025
West Indies	38	11	27	0	0	28.95	2003	2025
Zimbabwe	4	4	0	0	0	100.00	2021	2026
Total	233	70	153	3	7	30.04	1997	2026

== Twenty20 International ==
Pakistan women Twenty20 International record by opponent
Opponent	M	W	L	T	NR	Win%	First	Last
Australia	17	0	15	0	2	0.00	2012	2024
Bangladesh	22	17	5	0	0	77.27	2012	2026
Barbados	1	0	1	0	0	0.00	2022	2022
England	18	1	17	0	0	7.14	2009	2024
Hong Kong	1	1	0	0	0	100.00	2026	2026
India	18	3	15	0	0	16.66	2009	2026
Ireland	23	16	7	0	0	66.67	2009	2026
Malaysia	2	2	0	0	0	100.00	2018	2022
Nepal	1	1	0	0	0	100.00	2011	2024
Netherlands	2	2	0	0	0	100.00	2011	2026
New Zealand	12	2	10	0	0	16.67	2010	2024
South Africa	28	12	16	0	0	42.86	2010	2026
Sri Lanka	26	12	13	0	1	46.15	2009	2026
Thailand	5	3	1	0	1	60.00	2018	2026
United Arab Emirates	2	2	0	0	0	100.00	2022	2024
West Indies	24	4	16	3	1	16.67	2011	2026
Zimbabwe	3	3	0	0	0	100.00	2026	2026
Total	205	81	116	3	5	39.51	2009	2026
