= Carlisle Cricket Club =

Carlisle Cricket Club may refer to:

- Carlisle Cricket Club Ground in Dublin, Ireland
- Carlisle Cricket Club (England), club which plays at Edenside ground in Carlisle

== See also ==
- Petriana#Excavations, Roman bathhouse found at Carlisle Cricket Club (Edenside) ground in England
