= Gerald Duffy (disambiguation) =

Gerald Duffy may refer to:

- Gerald Duffy (1896–1928), American screenwriter
- Gerry Duffy (1930–2015), Irish cricketer
- Gerry Duffy (footballer) (1934–2017), English footballer, see List of Oldham Athletic A.F.C. players (25–99 appearances)
