= Robin Waters =

Irish cricketer and coach

Robin Hugh Clough Waters (6 December 1937 – 9 December 2017) was an Irish professional cricketer and cricket coach.

Waters was born in Calcutta and educated at Shrewsbury School and St Edmund Hall, Oxford. He played cricket for Oxford University, Sussex and Ireland. He appeared in 38 first-class matches from 1961-69 as a righthanded batsman and wicketkeeper. He scored 929 runs with a highest score of 70 and completed 52 catches with three stumpings. In 1961, he was driving a car that was involved in a collision, resulting in his passenger, Indian cricketer ’Tiger’ Pataudi, losing the sight in one eye.

In 1967 he became coach at Clontarf Cricket Club, Dublin, but continued to play for Ireland. Later, he was cricket coach at Belvedere College, Dublin.

== Death ==
Waters died three days after his 80th birthday in December 2017.
