= Louis Jacobson =

Irish cricketer

Personal information
- Full name: Louis Collins Jacobson
- Born: 26 January 1918; Dublin, Ireland
- Died: 6 December 2013 (aged 95); Dublin, Ireland
- Batting: Right-handed
- Role: Batsman

Domestic team information
- Years: Team
- 1948–1952: Ireland

Career statistics
| Competition | FC |
|---|---|
| Matches | 4 |
| Runs scored | 153 |
| Batting average | 30.60 |
| 100s/50s | 1/0 |
| Top score | 101* |
| Catches/stumpings | 1/– |
- Source: CricketArchive, 7 January 2014

Louis Collins Jacobson (26 January 1918 – 6 December 2013) was an Irish cricketer. A right-handed batsman from Dublin, he played twelve times for the Ireland cricket team between 1947 and 1959 including four first-class matches.

== Background ==
Jacobson attended secondary school at Wesley College in Dublin and studied medicine at Trinity College Dublin. He died on 6 December 2013 at the age of 95 and was buried at Dolphins Barn Jewish Cemetery.

== Sporting career ==
Jacobson represented Trinity College on the Dublin University Cricket Club. Louis was President of Clontarf Cricket Club from 1966 to 1968, also returning to senior cricket with the now defunct Carlisle Club, made up of members of Dublin's Jewish cricket community. His religion also found him representing a British and Irish side at the Maccabean Games, where cricket has often featured. His son Denis Jacobson followed him onto both the Dublin University and Carlisle teams.

Jacobson made his debut for Ireland against the MCC at Lord's in August 1947. His second match was against Yorkshire in June 1948, and he made his first-class debut against Scotland the following month. He played just once in 1949, against the MCC, and twice in 1950, against Scotland and Nottinghamshire. He did not play in 1951.

He played four times for Ireland in 1952, twice against India and once against Scotland, before his final first-class match, against the MCC in Dublin. He played against the MCC in June 1953, followed by six years out of the Ireland team, returning for his final match in July 1959, against Yorkshire.

Jacobson also played rugby. He was a senior rugby player for Old Wesley in the 1940s and was club president in 1962–1963.

== Statistics ==
In all matches for Ireland, Jacobson scored 358 runs at an average of 18.84, with a top score of 101 not out against Scotland in June 1950, his only century. In first-class cricket, he scored 153 runs at an average of 30.60, with his top-score being the unbeaten 101 against Scotland.
