= David Bevan (cricketer) =

English cricketer

David Gordon Bevan (born 11 June 1943) is an English retired cricketer who played as a right-handed batsman between 1964 and 1974 for Gloucestershire. He was also an overseas player for Eastern Province in the 1973/74 season, and played minor county cricket for Suffolk County Cricket Club in 1977.

Bevan, who was born in Gloucester, scored 706 first-class runs across his career of 36 matches at a batting average of 13.21, and 107 runs in one day cricket from six games. 101 of these first-class runs were scored in his three games for Eastern Province. The majority of his cricket was played in 1967, when he made 17 County Championship appearances for Gloucestershire, the only season when his number of games reached double figures.

He joined Leinster Cricket Club in Dublin as club professional in 1978, playing for the Senior 1s and coaching at all levels.
