= The Hills Cricket Club =

The Hills

Team information
- Founded: 1969
- Home ground: The Vineyard

The Hills Cricket Club is a cricket club in Skerries, County Dublin, Ireland, playing in Division 1 of the Leinster Senior League.

The club was established in 1969, winning the Leinster Junior Cup and Junior League in 1971, Intermediate Cup in 1972 and Intermediate League in 1973. Senior status was attained in 1983 and the first senior trophies – the Leinster Senior Cup and Leinster Senior League – came in 1989.

On 1 September 2012, the club won their first Irish Senior Cup defeating Merrion Cricket Club by 8 wickets in Castle Avenue, Clontarf.

== Current squad ==
- Players with international caps are listed in **bold**.
- *denotes players qualified to play for Ireland on residency or dual nationality.

Name	Nationality	Birth date	Batting style	Bowling style	Notes
Batsmen
Oliver Horlock	Australia*	29 January 2005 (age 21)	Right-handed	Right arm off break	
Yaseen Sherzad	Afghanistan*		Right-handed	Right arm medium	
Will Archer	Ireland		Right-handed	Right arm medium	
**Edson Silva**	Kuwait	4 April 1987 (age 38)	Right-handed	Right arm medium	
Joe Fletcher	Ireland		Right-handed	Right arm off break	
All-rounders
Muzamil Sherzad	Ireland	5 October 2002 (age 23)	Right-handed	Right arm fast-medium	
Brandon Kruger	South Africa*	12 December 2000 (age 25)	Right-handed	Right arm off break	
Tomás Murphy	Ireland	22 October 1992 (age 33)	Right-handed	Right arm medium	Captain
James Cusack	Australia*	13 October 1993 (age 32)	Right-handed	Right arm off break	
Pierce Ryan	Australia*		Right-handed	Right arm fast-medium	
Wicket-keepers
Mubeen Ali	Ireland		Right-handed	Right arm off break	
Andrew Kavanagh	Ireland		Right-handed	Right-arm leg break	
Bowlers
Cian Nulty	Ireland	3 October 2000 (age 25)	Right-handed	Right arm fast-medium	
Matthew Weldon	Ireland	31 December 2005 (age 20)	Right-handed	Left arm fast-medium	
Febin Manoj	Ireland		Right-handed	Right arm off break	
Sean McNicholl	Australia*	31 May 1998 (age 27)	Right-handed	Right arm fast-medium	

== Honours ==
- Irish Senior Cup: 2
  - 2012, 2014
- Leinster Senior League: 3
  - 1989, 2008, 2013
- Leinster Senior Cup: 5
  - 1989, 1996, 2005, 2006, 2017, 2019
