= Terenure Cricket Club =

Terenure

Team information
- Founded: 1910
- Home ground: Terenure Sports Club

Terenure Cricket Club, formerly CYM Cricket Club (standing for Catholic Young Men's Society) is a cricket club in Dublin, Ireland, playing in Division 2 of the Leinster Senior League.

The club was established in 1910 as part of the sporting section of the St Kevin's Catholic Young Men's Society (which had been formed in 1904), joining the Minor League in 1912 and the Intermediate League after the First World War. In 1923, CYM won promotion to the Junior League and moved to their current ground at Terenure.

Terenure currently features 5 Men's and 3 Women's teams with Youth Setups until the U-19 level.

==== Alumni : ====
Terenure has historically been linked to players such as:

====== Men's: ======
- Conor Hoey
- Andre Botha (cricketer)
- Seamus Lynch (cricketer)
- Dave Langford-Smith
- Dan van Zyl
- Michael Lax (cricketer)
- Bryn Thomas (cricketer)

====== Women's : ======
- Sophie Reid
