= Claremont Road Cricket Ground =

Sports facility in Dublin, Ireland

Coordinates: 53.33016°N 6.22000°W

YMCA Cricket Club Ground
- Claremont Road

Ground information
- Location: Claremont Road, Sandymount, Dublin, Ireland
- Country: Ireland
- Establishment: 1911; 114 years ago
- Capacity: 2,000
- End names
- n/a

International information
- First WODI: 31 July 2005: Ireland v Australia
- Last WODI: 8 June 2018: Ireland v New Zealand
- First WT20I: 16 July 2013: Ireland v Pakistan
- Last WT20I: 26 May 2019: Ireland v West Indies

Team information
YMCA Cricket Club (1911 – 2024)
- As of 20 August, 2015; Source: Ground profile

Claremont Road is a cricket ground in Dublin, Ireland. The first recorded match held on the ground came in 1994, when Munster played North West. In local domestic cricket, the ground was the home of YMCA Cricket Club.

In 2021, the ground was acquired from the YMCA by Lansdowne Rugby Club, who then ended the cricket club's lease in 2024.

The ground has hosted 5 Women's One Day Internationals (ODI), the first of which came in 2005 and saw Ireland women play Australia women. The second Women's ODI came in 2006 when Ireland women played the Netherlands women. In 2012 Ireland Women played Bangladesh and Pakistan in an ODI Tri-Series.

The ground also hosted final of 2013 ICC Women's World Twenty20 Qualifier between Pakistan and Sri Lanka. Pakistan and Sri Lanka both went on to be undefeated at the tournament, sharing the title after the final was interrupted by rain.

The ground was used to host two matches at the 2011 ICC Under-19 Cricket World Cup Qualifier.

== One Day International matches ==
The stadium has hosted following ODI matches till date.

Team (A)	Team (B)	Winner	Margin	Year
Ireland	Australia	Australia	By 240 runs	2005
Ireland	Netherlands	Ireland	By 84 runs	2006
Ireland	Pakistan	Pakistan	By 42 runs	2012
Ireland	Bangladesh	No result	No result	2012
Ireland	Pakistan	Pakistan	By 89 runs	2013

== T20 International matches ==
The stadium has hosted following T20I matches till date.

Team (A)	Team (B)	Winner	Margin	Year
Ireland	Pakistan	Pakistan	By 38 runs	2013
Ireland	Pakistan	Australia	By 9 wickets	2013
Pakistan	Sri Lanka	No result	No result	2013
Ireland	Australia	Australia	By 25 runs	2015
Ireland	Australia	Australia	By 55 runs	2015
Ireland	Australia	Australia	By 99 runs	2015
