= Gerry Duffy =

Irish cricketer

Personal information
- Full name: Gerald Andrew Anthony Duffy
- Born: 4 November 1930; Dublin, Ireland
- Died: 15 June 2015 (aged 84); Dublin, Ireland
- Batting: Right-handed
- Bowling: Leg spin

International information
- National side: Ireland (1953–1974)

Career statistics
Competition	First-class
Matches	16
Runs scored	317
Batting average	15.09
100s/50s	0/1
Top score	55*
Balls bowled	1,217
Wickets	15
Bowling average	28.40
5 wickets in innings	0
10 wickets in match	0
Best bowling	3/8
Catches/stumpings	12/–
- Source: CricketArchive, 6 August 2018

Gerald Andrew Anthony Duffy (4 November 1930 – 15 June 2015) was an Irish cricketer. A right-handed batsman and leg spin bowler, he made his debut for the Ireland cricket team in July 1953 against Scotland in a first-class match. He went on to play for Ireland on 55 occasions, his last match coming against the Netherlands in June 1974.

Of his matches for Ireland, 16 had first-class status. In all matches for Ireland, he scored 1123 runs at an average of 18.11, with a top score of 92 against the MCC in September 1970. He took 82 wickets at an average of 19.23, with best bowling of 6/29 against Australia in September 1961.

He played his club cricket at Leinster Cricket Club in Dublin where he was a stalwart of the 1st XI until the early 1980s. He played his final 1st XI match at the age of 60 recording figures of 4 for 70.

Duffy died on 15 June 2015, after a short illness, at the age of 84 years.
