= Anglesea Road Cricket Ground =

Cricket ground in Ballsbridge, Ireland

Coordinates: 53°19′26.67″N 6°13′56.31″W

- Interactive map of Anglesea Road Cricket Ground

Ground information
- Location: Anglesea Road; Ballsbridge; Dublin 4 Ireland
- Country: Ireland
- Establishment: 1931 (first recorded match)

International information
- First women's ODI: 27 July 1998: Ireland v Australia
- Last women's ODI: 5 August 2016: Ireland v South Africa
- Only women's T20I: 27 July 2013: Ireland v Sri Lanka

Team information
Merrion Cricket Club
- As of 3 September 2020; Source: Ground profile

Anglesea Road Cricket Ground is a cricket ground based on Anglesea Road in Ballsbridge, Dublin 4, Ireland. The first recorded match on the ground was in 1971, when South Leinster played Ulster Country. The ground has hosted a single List-A match which saw Papua New Guinea play the United States.

The ground has also hosted Women's One Day Internationals, one of which came in 2004 and saw Ireland women play New Zealand women.

In local domestic cricket, the ground is the home of Merrion Cricket Club who play in the Leinster League Division Two.
