= Leinster Senior League (cricket) =

Cricket Leinster Premier League
- Administrator: Leinster Cricket Union
- Cricket format: 50 Over
- Tournament format: Group stage
- Champions: Pembroke Cricket Club
- Participants: 12
- Official website: www.cricketleinster.ie

The Leinster Senior League is the provincial cricket league within the Leinster jurisdiction in Ireland, which covers the province of Leinster in the Republic of Ireland. The league was formed in 1919, the nine founding members being Phoenix, Leinster, Pembroke, Dublin University, Railway Union, Civil Service, U.C.D., County Kildare and the Royal Hibernian Military School. The league is currently divided into twenty one divisions, the top two (senior) divisions are designated as the Premier League and the Championship. It includes two member clubs from the Munster province: Cork County and Cork Harlequins.

Teams play each other twice per season, once at home and once away, with league positions determined on the basis of percentage of points gained out of possible total points. 20 points awarded for a win, 12.5 for a tie, no points are awarded for “no result”, and up to five bonus points are awarded, depending on the margin of victory. Matches consist of one innings per side, with a maximum of fifty, and a minimum of twenty overs bowled per innings.

In 2025, the Premier League will consist of 12 teams. These top 12 teams will play each other once in 2025 and then split into a top-half and bottom-half. The Top-half will play each other again for the Premier League Trophy whilst the bottom-half will play each other again for Championship Trophy.

The new First Team league is intended to comprise the next first teams. Each team in the new First Team League will play each other three times in 2025 (rather than twice as is the usual convention) totalling 12 league fixtures.

The Top team in the First Team League at the end of 2025 will be promoted to the Premier League for 2026 replacing the bottom team in the Premier League (subject to accreditation standards and OCC determination on final composition). The bottom team in the First Team League at end 2025 will be relegated and replaced by the top first team at the next level.

== Members of senior divisions for 2025 season ==
Premier League/Championship

- Balbriggan
- Clontarf
- Cork County
- Leinster
- Malahide
- Merrion
- North County
- Pembroke
- Phoenix
- Railway Union
- Rush
- The Hills

First Team League

- Adamstown
- Civil Service
- Cork Harlequins
- North Kildare
- Terenure

Source: Cricket Leinster

== List of champions ==
Season	Champions
1919	Leinster
1920	Leinster
1921	Phoenix
1922	Phoenix
1923	Pembroke
1924	Phoenix
1925	Phoenix
1926	Clontarf
1927	Dublin University
1928	Leinster
1929	Leinster
1930	Leinster
1931	Leinster
1932	Leinster
1933	Leinster
1934	Leinster
1935	Leinster
1936	Phoenix
1937	Leinster
1938	Pembroke
1939	Leinster
1940	Merrion
1941	Leinster
1942	Phoenix
1943	Phoenix
1944	Leinster
1945	Merrion
1946	Pembroke
1947	Dublin University
1948	Dublin University
1949	Phoenix
1950	Leinster
1951	Pembroke
1952	Merrion
1953	Leinster
1954	Pembroke
1955	YMCA
1956	Phoenix
1957	Pembroke
1958	Merrion
1959	Leinster
1960	Railway Union
1961	Clontarf
1962	Railway Union
1963	Leinster
1964	Malahide
1965	YMCA
1966	Dublin University
1967	Pembroke
1968	Pembroke
1969	Pembroke
1970	Dublin University
1971	Malahide
1972	Clontarf
1973	Pembroke
1974	Old Belvedere
1975	Phoenix
1976	Old Belvedere
1977	Malahide
1978	Phoenix
1979	Phoenix
1980	Malahide
1981	Leinster
1982	Leinster
1983	Phoenix
1984	Leinster
1985	Phoenix
1986	YMCA
1987	Phoenix
1988	Carlisle
1989	The Hills
1990	YMCA
1991	Clontarf
1992	Clontarf
1993	YMCA
1994	Pembroke
1995	Clontarf
1996	Clontarf
1997	Carlisle
1998	Leinster
1999	Clontarf
2000	Clontarf
2001	Merrion
2002	Pembroke
2003	North County
2004	North County
2005	North County
2006	North County
2007	Clontarf
2008	The Hills
2009	Clontarf
2010	North County
2011	Railway Union
2012	Leinster
2013	The Hills
2014	YMCA
2015	Clontarf
2016	Clontarf
2017	Leinster
2018	Merrion
2019	Pembroke
2020	not played
2021	Merrion
2022	Balbriggan
2023	YMCA
2024	Pembroke
2025	Pembroke
2025	Pembroke

== Performance by club ==
=== Summary of winners ===
Team	Wins
Leinster	24
Pembroke	16
Phoenix	15
Clontarf	13
Merrion	7
YMCA	7
Dublin University	5
North County	5
Malahide	4
The Hills	3
Railway Union	3
Carlisle	2
Balbriggan	1
Old Belvedere	1

== See also ==
- Leinster Senior Cup
- Irish Senior Cup
- NCU Senior League
- North West Senior League
