= Malahide Cricket Club =

Coordinates: 53.449329°N 6.161233°W

Malahide
Personnel
- Captain: Fintan McAllister

Team information
- Colors: Black & Gold
- Founded: 1861
- Home ground: Malahide Cricket Club Ground
- Capacity: 11,500

Malahide Cricket Club was founded in 1861 and is situated within Malahide Castle demesne, near the railway station. The club has over 400 members and is open all year round. The club currently fields 20 teams (5 Senior Men's, 2 Ladies, Development XI, 12 youth and a Taverners side).

The club has won a number of honours in its history, most notably the Irish Senior Cup in 2002 (Men's) and the Ladies' Senior Cup and Pilkington Plate competitions.

== Current squad ==
- Players with international caps are listed in **bold**.
- *denotes players qualified to play for Ireland on residency or dual nationality.

Name	Nationality	Birth date	Batting Style	Bowling Style	Notes
Batsmen
Cormac McLoughlin-Gavin	Ireland	30 April 1994 (age 32)	Right-handed	Right arm off break	
Robbie Foulkes	New Zealand*	27 December 2004 (age 21)	Right-handed	Right arm medium	
Adam Doyle	Ireland		Right-handed	Right arm off-break	
Aaron Doyle	Ireland		Right-handed	Right arm off break	
All-rounders
Jeremy Martins	Portugal	11 June 2001 (age 25)	Right-handed	Right arm fast-medium	Overseas Pro
Andrew Sheridan	Ireland		Left-handed	Left arm medium	
Matt Ford	Ireland	10 April 1994 (age 32)	Right-handed	Right arm off break	
Timcy Khanduja	India*		Right-handed	Right arm medium	
Mohit Sane	India*		Right-handed	Slow left-arm orthodox	
Jordan Hollard	South Africa		Right-handed	Right arm medium	
Wicket-keepers
Matthew Langan	Ireland		Right-handed	—	
Bowlers
Michael Frost	Ireland	29 May 2001 (age 25)	Right-handed	Slow left-arm orthodox	
Kelvin Donnelly	South Africa*		Right-handed	Right arm medium	Vice Captain
James Newland	England*	21 December 1993 (age 32)	Left-handed	Left arm fast-medium	Captain
Cameron Shoebridge	Scotland*	7 October 1997 (age 28)	Right-handed	Right arm fast-medium	

== Home ground ==
The Village or Malahide Cricket Club Ground is a cricket ground in Malahide, Ireland. The ground is owned by the Malahide Cricket Club and has been developed to take a capacity of 11,500 when using temporary grandstands making it Ireland's biggest cricket venue.

In September 2013, International Cricket Council cleared the ground to host an international cricket match. The ground hosted its first international cricket match when home team Ireland played against England, with England winning by six wickets after captain Eoin Morgan hit 124 not out on what had been his home ground in his youth.

Malahide was also set to be the stage for two Twenty20 games against the touring South Africa A side in 2012, but both games were cancelled.

The ground became Ireland's third venue for international cricket, along with Castle Avenue in Dublin and the Civil Service Cricket Club Ground at Stormont.

== Honours ==
- Irish Senior Cup: 1
  - 2002
- National Irish Cup: 2
  - 2013, 2017
- Leinster Senior League: 4
  - 1964, 1971, 1977, 1980
- Leinster Senior Cup: 2
  - 1959, 1971
- Alan Murray T20 Cup: 8
  - 1953, 1964, 1966, 1974, 1977, 1978, 2003, 2019
- Women's Leinster Senior League: 4
  - 2002, 2004, 2005, 2006
- Women's Leinster Senior Cup: 5
  - 2002, 2003, 2004, 2006, 2008

== Notable players ==
- Douglas Goodwin
- Eoin Morgan
- Johan Botha
