= The Vineyard, Dublin =

Cricket ground in Dublin, Ireland

Coordinates: 53°33′53.70″N 6°08′41.34″W

The Vineyard
Ground information
- Location: County Dublin, Ireland
- Country: Ireland
- Establishment: 1969

International information
- First WODI: 30 July 2006: Ireland v India
- Last WODI: 10 June 2018: Ireland v New Zealand
- Only WT20I: 25 May 2009: Ireland v Pakistan

Team information
The Hills Cricket Club
- As of 13 February 2021; Source: ESPNcricinfo

The Vineyard is a cricket ground in Dublin, Ireland. In local domestic cricket, the ground is the home of The Hills Cricket Club. The first recorded match on the ground was in 1992, when Munster played North Leinster. In 2005, the ground hosted two List A matches in the 2005 ICC Trophy. The first of these saw Bermuda play Scotland, which resulted in a Scottish victory by 6 wickets. In the second match Namibia claimed a 103-run victory over Denmark.

The ground hosted a women's One Day International (ODI) between Ireland and India in 2006, which India won by 78 runs. In 2009, it hosted another ODI between Ireland and the Netherlands, which Ireland won by 10 wickets. Also in 2009, the ground held a women's Twenty20 International (T20I) between Ireland and Pakistan, which Ireland won by 9 wickets.

The ground held a men's first-class match between Ireland and Afghanistan in the 2011–13 Intercontinental Cup.
