= Douglas Goodwin =

Irish cricketer (1938–2024)

Dougie Goodwin
Personal information
- Full name: Douglas Edward Goodwin
- Born: 2 May 1938; Clontarf, Dublin, Ireland
- Died: 11 August 2024 (aged 86); Dublin, Ireland
- Batting: Right-handed
- Bowling: Right-arm fast-medium

International information
- National side: Ireland

Career statistics
| Competition | First-class |
|---|---|
| Matches | 11 |
| Runs scored | 188 |
| Batting average | 13.42 |
| 100s/50s | 0/0 |
| Top score | 39 |
| Balls bowled | 1,703 |
| Wickets | 20 |
| Bowling average | 29.15 |
| 5 wickets in innings | 1 |
| 10 wickets in match | 0 |
| Best bowling | 5/46 |
| Catches/stumpings | 2/– |
- Source: CricketArchive, 15 November 2022

Douglas Edward Goodwin (2 May 1938 – 11 August 2024) was an Irish cricketer. A right-handed batsman and right-arm fast-medium bowler, he played 43 times for the Ireland cricket team between 1965 and 1975, including eleven first-class matches. Goodwin died on 11 August 2024, at the age of 86.

== Playing career ==
Goodwin made his debut for Ireland against the MCC in June 1965 at Lord's and made his first-class debut the following month against New Zealand in Belfast. He played twice more in 1965, against Scotland and Hampshire and just once in 1966, against Scotland. He then played against Worcestershire and India in 1967.

In August 1968, he took 7/39 against the Combined Services cricket team, his best bowling figures for Ireland, and also played against Australia and Scotland. The following year was to be his most successful for Ireland.

1969 started in June with a first-class match against Scotland. His next match has gone down in history as one of Ireland's greatest performances.

On 2 July 1969, at Sion Mills, Ireland took on the West Indies. The West Indies were on a tour of England at the time and hopped over to Ireland for two matches against the national side. Goodwin was chosen to captain the Ireland side and took five wickets for six runs as the West Indies were bowled out for 25. Ireland went on to win by nine wickets for a famous win.

Rumours later suggested that the Irish had ensured their opponents would be intoxicated the night before, but speaking in 2003 Goodwin denied that, saying "They were very late getting in on the plane and they had a long drive from the airport. We might have had a few, but I don't think they had time to have a drink". The Irish drew the subsequent two-day game, thus winning the series.

Also in 1969, Goodwin scored 41 against Wilfred Isaac's XI, his top score in all matches for Ireland.

Goodwin continued in the Irish team until 1975, playing against Canada, Denmark, Netherlands, Scotland, the USA and Wales. A match against Denmark in July 1975 would be his last for Ireland.

== Statistics ==
In all matches for Ireland, Goodwin scored 494 runs at an average of 12.35 and took 115 wickets at an average of 22.18.
