= YMCA Cricket Club =

YMCA

Team information
- Founded: 1890; 135 years ago
- Home ground: Claremont Road
- Official website: www.ymcadublin.com

YMCA Cricket Club is a cricket club in Dublin, Ireland, playing in Division 1 of the Leinster Senior League.

The club was established in 1890 and acquired its current grounds at Claremont Road in 1911. Senior status was achieved in 1934 and the club won the Leinster Senior League for the first time in 1955.

In 2024, the club withdrew from competitive cricket as a result of the ending of its lease of its grounds at Claremont Road.

Former Irish internationals include Alan Lewis, Angus Dunlop, Jonathan Garth, Mark Nulty, Stewart M. Taylor, Keith Bailey, Ian Lewis, Roderick Gill, Reginald Lyons, Reinhardt Strydom, Albert van der Merwe and Trent Johnston.

== Honours ==
- Leinster Senior League: 7
  - 1955, 1965, 1986, 1990, 1993, 2014, 2023
- Leinster Senior League Cup: 12
  - 1984, 1986, 1987, 1988, 1990, 1991, 1994, 2001, 2002, 2013, 2016, 2020
