= North County Cricket Club =

Sporting organisation in County Dublin, Ireland

North County

Team information
- Founded: 1985
- Home ground: The Inch

North County Cricket Club is a cricket club in Balrothery, County Dublin, Ireland, playing in Division 1 of the Leinster Senior League.

The club was established in 1985 by the merger of Balrothery and Man O'War cricket clubs. North County is Ireland's most successful cricket club with 5 all Ireland titles.

- Irish Senior Cup: 5
  - 2001, 2003, 2005, 2007, 2008
- Leinster Senior League: 5
  - 2003, 2004, 2005, 2006, 2010
- Leinster Senior Cup: 1
  - 2003

== Current Squad ==
- Players with international caps are listed in **bold**.
- *denotes players qualified to play for Ireland on residency or dual nationality.

Name	Nationality	Birth date	Batting Style	Bowling Style	Notes
Batsmen
John Devane	Ireland		Left-handed	Right arm medium	
Hunter Kindley	New Zealand	10 October 1999 (age 25)	Right-handed	Right arm off break	Overseas Pro
Suliman Safi	Afghanistan	17 March 2003 (age 22)	Left-handed	—	
Nial McGovern	Ireland	15 January 1995 (age 30)	Right-handed	Right arm leg break	
Ciaran Sheridan	Ireland		Right-handed	—	
Shreehari Madyalkar	Ireland		Right-handed	Right arm off break	
Ben McBride	Ireland		Right-handed	Right arm off break	
Brian Dunphy	Ireland	14 August 2008 (age 17)	Right-handed	Right arm leg break	
All-rounders
**Eddie Richardson**	Ireland	22 July 1990 (age 35)	Right-handed	Right arm medium	Captain
Ashish Jain	Ireland		Right-handed	Right arm fast-medium	
Abdul Sattar	Ireland		Right-handed	Right arm medium	
Alan Joseph Mathew	India*		Right-handed	Right arm medium	
**Simi Singh**	Ireland	4 February 1987 (age 38)	Right-handed	Right arm off break	
Wicket-keepers
**Jamie Grassi**	Italy*	9 October 1998 (age 26)	Right-handed	—	
Luke Whelan	Ireland	12 December 2003 (age 21)	Right-handed	—	
Bowlers
Sean Sludds	Ireland		Right-handed	Right arm medium	
Tanvir Hasan	Ireland	12 January 1992 (age 33)	Right-handed	Right arm leg break	
Johan George	Ireland		Right-handed	Right arm leg break	
Abdul Ghaffar	Ireland		Right-handed	Right arm medium	

== Facilities ==
The impressive facilities at North County Cricket Club include Ireland's only purpose-built Centre of Excellence indoor training centre that is used by both the men's and ladies Ireland cricket teams as well as International and Provincial sides.

== Overseas professionals ==
The club regularly welcomes overseas professionals at the club. In 2018 Malcolm Nofal represented the club before returning to New Zealand. In 2019 Yassar Cook represented the club before returning to South Africa.

== Teams fielded ==
In 2019 North County Cricket Club fielded 4 men's teams and 7 junior teams. The junior section comprised both boys and girls teams.

== Notable players ==
- Eoin Morgan - England Captain
- Eddie Richardson - Ireland cricket team
