= Castle Avenue cricket ground =

Clontarf cricket club's primary ground, Dublin, Ireland

Castle Avenue Cricket Ground
- Clontarf Cricket Club Ground
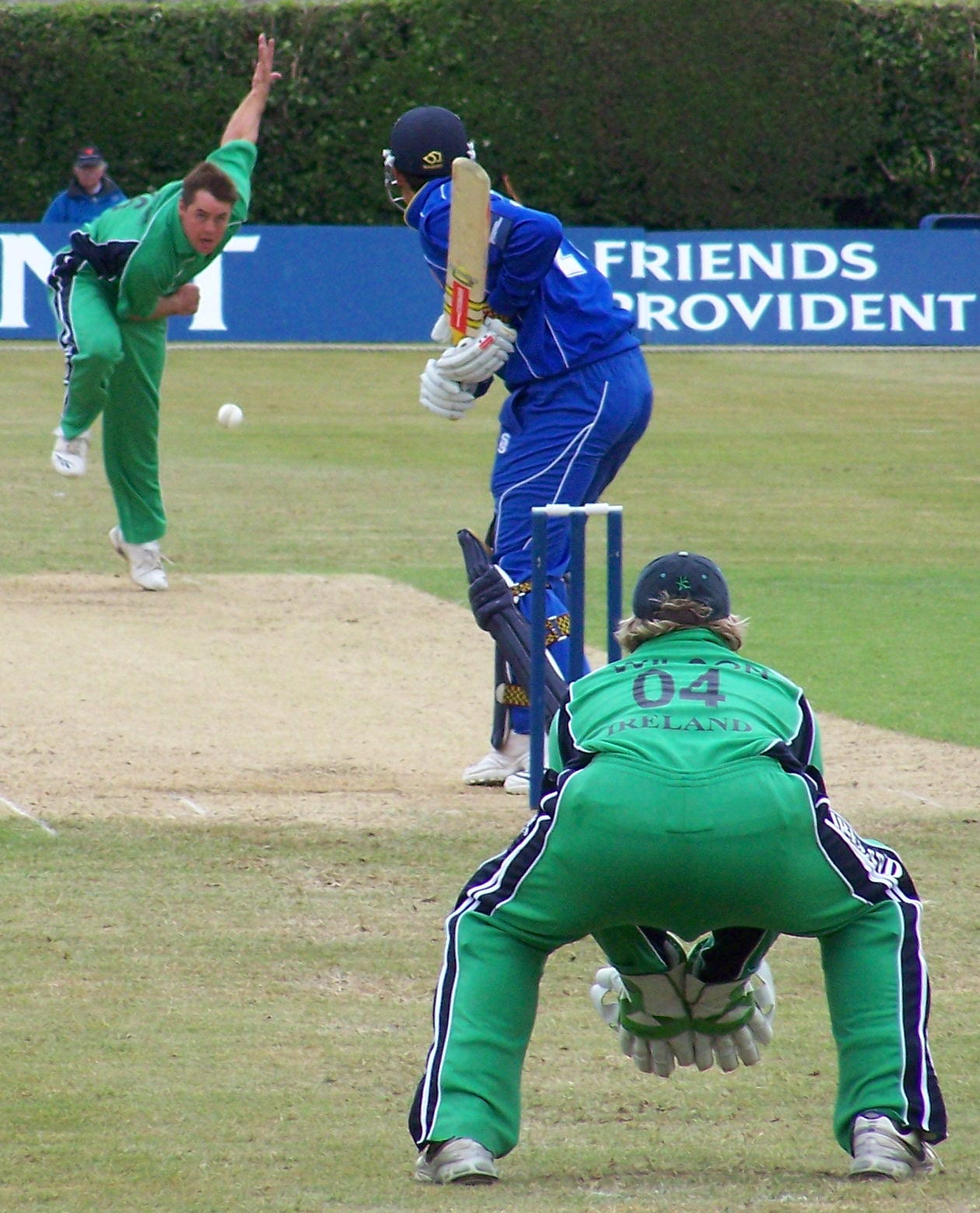
- Ireland compete against Essex at Castle Avenue in May 2007
- Interactive map of Castle Avenue Cricket Ground

Ground information
- Location: Clontarf, Dublin, Ireland
- Country: Ireland
- Coordinates: 53°22′057″N 6°12′26″W
- Establishment: 1958
- Capacity: 3,200
- End names
- City End; L.P Hughes End

International information
- First men's ODI: 21 May 1999: Bangladesh v West Indies
- Last men's ODI: 25 May 2025: Ireland v West Indies
- First men's T20I: 25 July 2015: Afghanistan v Oman
- Last men's T20I: 14 May 2024: Ireland v Pakistan
- First women's ODI: 16 August 1990: Ireland v England
- Last women's ODI: 28 July 2023: Ireland v Australia
- First women's T20I: 28 August 2012: Ireland v Bangladesh
- Last women's T20I: 10 August 2025: Ireland v Pakistan

Team information
Clontarf Cricket Club	(1896 – present)
- As of 14 May 2024; Source: Cricinfo

Castle Avenue Cricket Ground, also known as Clontarf Cricket Club Ground, is a cricket facility in the suburb of Clontarf, Dublin, Ireland. It is the primary of the two grounds of Clontarf Cricket Club, the secondary being at Mount Temple Comprehensive School, and the lands on which it lies are also home to two rugby union pitches belonging to Clontarf FC. The ground is one of only four One Day International grounds on the island of Ireland.

== Location and capacity ==
The ground lies on a lane off Castle Avenue in central Clontarf, near Clontarf Castle, and have been home to Clontarf Cricket Club since 1896. The 50th anniversary of the first game played on the current cricket field was celebrated in 2008. It has a capacity of 3,200 spectators. The playing field's ends are named "Killester" and "City".

== History ==
Clontarf Cricket Club began operations on a site on Vernon Avenue in 1876. They moved to a site near the end of Howth Road in 1892, which they started to share with rugby union side Clontarf Football Club. The two clubs moved to the site off Castle Avenue in 1896. Operations were suspended from 1914 to 1918, and during World War II, the site was used for allotments. Fully separate playing areas were set out from 1947, and the two clubs swapped fields in 1958, from which time the current playing areas date.

== International cricket ==
Clontarf is one of four One Day International (ODI) grounds in Ireland (the others being Stormont in Belfast, Malahide in Dublin and Bready in County Tyrone), hosting its first ODI match on 21 May 1999 as part of the 1999 Cricket World Cup when Bangladesh played the West Indies. Ireland played their first ODI at that venue in July 2007 against the West Indies as part of a quadrangular series.

It was selected as a venue to host matches in the 2015 ICC World Twenty20 Qualifier tournament.

In May 2017, the venue hosted its first match between two Full Member teams when Bangladesh played New Zealand in the 2017 Ireland Tri-Nation Series.

== Other sports ==
There are also two rugby union pitches within the complex, which is home to both cricket and rugby, with Clontarf FC, since 1896. The clubs swapped sides of the complex (fields) in 1958.

== Records ==
=== International centuries ===
==== ODI Centuries ====
Eight ODI centuries have been scored at the venue.

No.	Score	Player	Team	Balls	Opposing team	Date	Result
1	116*	Gary Wilson	Ireland	113	Netherlands	16 August 2010	Won
2	122*	Mohammad Hafeez	Pakistan	113	Ireland	23 May 2013	Tied
3	103	Paul Stirling (1/2)	Ireland	107	Pakistan	23 May 2013	Tied
4	116*	Ed Joyce	Ireland	132	Pakistan	26 May 2013	Lost
5	179	John Campbell	West Indies	137	Ireland	5 May 2019	Won
6	170	Shai Hope (1/2)	West Indies	152	Ireland	5 May 2019	Won
7	109	Shai Hope (2/2)	West Indies	132	Bangladesh	7 May 2019	Lost
8	130	Paul Stirling (2/2)	Ireland	141	Bangladesh	15 May 2019	Lost

=== International five-wicket hauls ===
As of 11 January 2020

Five-wicket hauls have been taken on the ground on four occasions, all of them in ODIs.

Five-wicket hauls in Men's One Day International matches at Castle Avenue
No.	Bowler	Date	Team	Opposing Team	Inn	O	R	W	Result
1	John Blain	29 July 2008 (Note: This match took place during the 2008 European Cricket Championship Division One final competition which was held in Ireland.)	Scotland	Netherlands	1	9	22	5	Scotland won
2	James Hopes	17 June 2010	Australia	Ireland	2	9	14	5	Australia won
3	Abu Jayed	15 May 2019 (Note: This match was part of the 2017 Ireland Tri-Nation Series between Ireland, Bangladesh and New Zealand.)	Bangladesh	Ireland	1	9	58	5	Bangladesh won

Five-wicket hauls in Women's One Day International matches at Castle Avenue
No.	Bowler	Date	Team	Opposing Team	Inn	O	R	W	Result
1	Amelia Kerr (Note: Kerr's five-wicket haul was her first in international cricket. She also scored 232 not out during the same match, a new record in women's ODI cricket. She was aged 17 when the match was played.)	13 June 2018	New Zealand	Ireland	2	7	17	5	New Zealand won
