= Pembroke Cricket Club =

Pembroke

Team information
- Founded: 1868
- Home ground: Sydney Parade

Pembroke Cricket Club was founded in 1868 and is located at Sydney Parade, Park Avenue, just outside the old village of Sandymount in the prosperous Dublin suburb of Ballsbridge. The grounds were part of the lands of the Pembroke Estate from which the club took its name. In 1983, the club bought out the ground from the Estate and now is the joint owner in conjunction with Monkstown Football Club.

The Club fields six men's teams in league and cup competitions. Players have included Frank Malin, bowler and first man to hold the position of chairman of the Irish Cricket Union. Harry Hill, Master of the High Court, kept wicket from 1947 to 1977. Hill held the Leinster record with 502 dismissals (292 catches and 210 stumpings), until recently surpassed by Charlie Kavanagh, also a Pembroke wicket keeper.

There are also two ladies' teams and schoolboy-league teams at under-11, -13, -15, -17 -19 age groups. The First XI have a proud record winning the Leinster Senior Cup in its inaugural year, 1935 and on twelve occasions since. It has regularly provided players to the Irish team of whom S.F. Bergin, with fifty-three caps between 1949 and 1965 is the most famous.

The club is an affiliate of the Leinster Cricket Union

== Current squad ==
- Players with international caps are listed in **bold**.
- *denotes players qualified to play for Ireland on residency or dual nationality.

Name	Nationality	Birth date	Batting Style	Bowling Style	Notes
Batsmen
**Andrew Balbirnie**	Ireland	28 December 1990 (age 35)	Right-handed	Right arm off break	
**Harry Tector**	Ireland	6 December 1999 (age 26)	Right-handed	Right arm off-break	
Jack Tector	Ireland	2 September 1996 (age 30)	Right-handed	Right arm off break	
Tim Tector	Ireland	7 March 2003 (age 23)	Right-handed	Right arm off break	
Macdara Cosgrave	Ireland	10 November 2005 (age 20)	Right-handed	Right arm off break	
All-rounders
Addison Sheriff	Australia	21 July 2006 (age 20)	Right-handed	Right arm fast-medium	Overseas Pro
Jonathan Garth	Ireland	19 December 2000 (age 25)	Right-handed	Right arm leg break	
Daniel Murray	Ireland	5 November 2007 (age 18)	Right-handed	Right arm medium	
**Barry McCarthy**	Ireland	13 September 1992 (age 34)	Right-handed	Right arm fast-medium	
**Gavin Hoey**	Ireland	5 November 2001 (age 24)	Right-handed	Right arm leg break	
Wicket-keepers
**Lorcan Tucker**	Ireland	10 September 1996 (age 30)	Right-handed	—	
Greg Hollins	England*	30 June 1991 (age 35)	Right-handed	—	
Sam Murphy	Ireland	18 September 1998 (age 27)	Left-handed	—	
Bowlers
**Josh Little**	Ireland	1 November 1999 (age 26)	Right-handed	Left arm fast-medium	
Byron McDonough	Ireland	27 September 2001 (age 24)	Right-handed	Right arm fast-medium	
Fiachra Tucker	Ireland	5 December 1997 (age 28)	Right-handed	Right arm leg break	
Paul Lawson	Ireland		Right-handed	Right arm off break	Captain
Joe Prendergast	Ireland		Right-handed	Right arm medium	
Oliver Riley	Ireland	7 November 2006 (age 19)	Right-handed	Right arm medium	
Mark Berry	Ireland		Right-handed	Right arm fast-medium	
Padraic Flanagan	Ireland	9 March 1996 (age 30)	Right-handed	Right-arm fast-medium	
Luke Murray	Ireland	5 November 2007 (age 18)	Right-handed	Right-arm medium	

== Honours ==
- Irish Senior Cup: 2
  - 2019, 2026
- Leinster Senior League: 16
  - 1923, 1938, 1946, 1951, 1954, 1957, 1967, 1968, 1969, 1973, 1994, 2002, 2019, 2024, 2025, 2026
- Leinster Senior Cup: 16
  - 1935, 1944, 1946, 1954, 1957, 1972, 1974, 1980, 1983, 1993, 1997, 1999, 2022, 2024, 2025, 2026
