= Leinster Cricket Club =

Leinster

Team information
- Founded: 1852
- Home ground: Observatory Lane

Leinster Cricket Club is an Irish cricket club which was founded in Rathgar in 1852. The Dublin sports club now hosts tennis, squash, table tennis, bowls and cricket. The Leinster Sports Club complex is situated in the Observatory Lane ground, in the heart of Rathmines. The cricket section currently has eight men's teams, three women's sides and fifteen youth sides.

In 1860, Leinster hosted the first visit to Ireland by the All-England XI on the club's field in Lord Palmerston's demesne. The club also brought W. G. Grace to Ireland for the first time in 1873. In 1875 Ireland's rugby union team played its first home game at the cricket ground as Lansdowne Road was deemed unsuitable.

Leinster hold the record for the most Leinster Senior League titles, with 23.

== Current Squad ==
- Players with international caps are listed in **bold**.
- *denotes players qualified to play for Ireland on residency or dual nationality.

Name	Nationality	Birth date	Batting Style	Bowling Style	Notes
Batsmen
Monil Patel	India*	5 May 1990 (age 35)	Right-handed	Right arm medium	
Bilal Azhar	Pakistan*	13 October 1988 (age 37)	Right-handed	Right arm off break	Capatain
Rian Cassidy	Ireland		Right-handed	—	
Luke Horgan	Ireland		Right-handed	—	
Younas Ahmadzai	Afghanistan	16 November 1995 (age 30)	Right-handed	Right arm off break	
All-rounders
Saqib Bahadur	Pakistan*		Right-handed	Right arm off break	
**Gareth Delany**	Ireland	28 April 1997 (age 28)	Right-handed	Right arm leg break	
Tom Johnson	Ireland	1 February 2004 (age 22)	Left-handed	Slow left-arm orthodox	
Thomas O'Connor	New Zealand	10 August 2004 (age 21)	Right-handed	Left arm fast-medium	Overseas Pro
Wicket-keepers
Tristen de Beer	South Africa*	21 October 2001 (age 24)	Right-handed	—	
Bowlers
Joe Carroll	Australia*	21 June 1991 (age 34)	Right-handed	Right arm fast-medium	
Devan Keenan	Ireland		Right-handed	Right arm medium	
Luke Callanan	Australia	9 September 2004 (age 21)	Right-handed	Right arm fast-medium	
Mark Tonge	Ireland		Right-handed	Right arm medium	
Jai Moondra	Ireland		Left-handed	Left arm fast-medium	

== Honours ==
- Irish Senior Cup: 2
  - 2009, 2023
- Leinster Senior League: 24
  - 1919, 1920, 1928, 1929, 1930, 1931, 1932, 1933, 1934, 1935, 1937, 1939, 1941, 1944, 1950, 1953, 1959, 1963, 1981, 1982, 1984, 1998, 2012, 2017
- Leinster Senior Cup: 10
  - 1936, 1941, 1953, 1955, 1956, 1958, 1968, 1981, 1985, 1998

== Selected current players ==
- Gareth Delany

== Selected former players ==
- David Bevan
- Louis Bookman
- Carlos Brathwaite
- Gerry Duffy
- Eddie Ingram
- Trent Johnston
- Bob Lambert
- Jack Short
