= Rush Cricket Club =

Cricket club in Ireland

Rush
Personnel
- Captain: Jarred Barnes
- Coach: Conor Armstrong

Team information
- Colours: Maroon and Gold
- Home ground: Kenure

Rush Cricket Club is a cricket club in Rush, County Dublin, Ireland. The club fielded three adult men's teams in 2021 with the first team playing in Division 2 of the Leinster Senior League. The second team are in Division 4. The third team are in Division 11. The second team won division 5 in 2019.

Notable former players include Ireland captain William Porterfield and England World Cup winning captain Eoin Morgan. The club has developed a strong youth policy with players being involved in Irish underage sides at all age groups over the winter of 2016/17. The club has won 5 underage titles from 2013 to 2018 in the U11, U13 and U15 age groups. The first team has also won the National cup on 3 occasions in 2015, 2016 and 2018. The Cricket Leinster winter training squads included 24 players from the club in the various age groups ranging from under 11 to under 17.

== Current squad ==
- Players with international caps are listed in **bold**.
- *denotes players qualified to play for Ireland on residency or dual nationality.

| Name | Nationality | Birth date | Batting Style | Bowling Style | Notes |
Batsmen
| Hashir Sultan | Ireland | 7 June 1995 (age 29) | Right-handed | Right arm medium | |
| Jack Mcgee | Ireland | | Right-handed | Right arm off break | |
| Prashanth Viswanath | Ireland | | Right-handed | Right arm off break | |
| Sean McCormack | Ireland | | Right-handed | Right arm off break | |
| Callum Armstrong | Ireland | | Right-handed | Right arm leg break | |
All-rounders
| Nathan McGuire | Ireland | 25 February 2003 (age 22) | Right-handed | Right arm off break | |
| Brandon Morris | Ireland | 15 March 2000 (age 25) | Right-handed | Right arm medium | |
Wicket-keepers
| Nathan Engelbrecht | South Africa | 30 May 2001 (age 23) | Left-handed | | |
| Finn Mcgee | Ireland | | Right-handed | | |
| Kyle Rock | Ireland | | Right-handed | — | |
Bowlers
| Conor Butterly | Ireland | | Right-handed | Right arm medium | |
| Nasir Totakhil | | 15 March 2000 (age 25) | Left-handed | Left arm leg spin | |
| Jarred Barnes | South Africa* | 9 February 1988 (age 37) | Right-handed | Right arm fast-medium | Captain |
| Alex Neary | Ireland | 21 December 2000 (age 24) | Right-handed | Left arm medium | |
| **Allan Eastwood** | Ireland | 22 October 1979 (age 45) | Right-handed | Right arm medium | |
| Asher Abbasi | Ireland | | Right-handed | Right arm medium | |
