= Phoenix Cricket Club =

Phoenix

Personnel
- Captain: Shane Getkate

Team information
- Colors: Black, Red and Green
- Founded: 1830
- Home ground: Phoenix Park

Phoenix Cricket Club is a Dublin-based club that currently fields six men's teams, two women's teams, youth teams (for both sexes) in six age bands and an over 40s "Taverners" team.

== History ==
Phoenix CC is the oldest cricket club in Ireland, founded in 1830, by John Parnell, the father of Charles Stewart Parnell. The younger Parnell, famous for bringing Irish home rule to the forefront of the political agenda, was a member for a short time. It was founded about five years before Dublin University Cricket Club

The club has been based in Dublin's Phoenix Park for nearly its entire history, apart from 1835–1838. During those years, Phoenix played their home games in fields near the current site of the Grand Canal, by Upper Baggot Street. During the 1930s, 1940s and 1970s, Phoenix was the dominant club in Leinster cricket.

=== Early years ===
Prior to 1834, the club members met and practised in the Phoenix Park, but in 1835 the club moved out of the Park and played in matches in the open fields south of the canal.

Two of the prestigious early members of the club, Lord Dunloe and Lord Clonbrock, were also on the 1833 members list at the MCC. Together with V.E. Alcock, they were mainly responsible for the club expanding and developing over its first 20 years until it reached its zenith as the "Premier Club of Ireland," a contemporaneous description by the newspapers. All the founder-members were later given "Life Membership" in recognition of their service to the club.

In February 1838, the club relocated to the Phoenix Park again. As the club continued to prosper, the membership increased each year and 20 to 25 matches were played annually. However, in 1846 the road through the Phoenix Park was widened and the club had to move again. A new ground in an adjacent area was recommended, and in view of the expense already incurred by the Club the move was financed by the "Board of Works," at a cost of £73 and Phoenix has been at its present ground since 1847.

=== International cricket ===
The first Irish tour to North America was in 1879. Of the thirteen games played against the Philadelphia cricket club, ten were won, two were drawn and one was lost. South Africa made its second visit to Ireland in 1901. At this time, a dispute arose over the method of selecting the Irish team, and as a result, two of the leading Dublin clubs withdrew their names from selection, as did the Northern clubs. The Irish team eventually selected had ten Phoenix men and Bill Harrington of Leinster. (Though Leinster was a party to the dispute, Harrington was also a member of the County Kildare Club, which had kept out of the dispute). Disputes were no uncommon at the time, a few years earlier six Phoenix men had withdrawn from an Irish team because of insufficient Phoenix representation.

By 1902, the quarrel over selecting the Irish team was over, and a squad was selected to play a trial match at the Phoenix ground in May 1902. This was selected for a short tour in England. The first match was against W. G. Grace's London County side, and the Irish team won. The third match was at Oxford, with the Irish team losing by 62 runs. The last match was against Cambridge, and Ireland won by 58 runs.

=== Leinster Senior League ===
The Leinster Senior League was formed in 1919 and, while Phoenix had a considerably reduced membership due to the Troubles, the Phoenix team was still up to par. The subconscious policy of being a club for officers and gentlemen still persisted, while the practice of electing a captain on a match-to-match basis continued up until 1932 when W. R. Allen became the first captain appointed for a whole season.

=== Centenary celebrations ===
The Phoenix centenary was celebrated without too much pomp and fuss with a match against R. H. Lambert's selected XI, though the game was rain-affected.

=== Later years ===
The years 1950–1970 were without the glory of the previous years due to an aging team. Despite 2 cups in the 1950s, the next decade was without a major trophy during the whole of that decade.

In the latter part of the 1960s one of the most cohesive and formidable teams in the history of Leinster cricket began to emerge. After 22 years, Phoenix won the John Player Senior cup in 1973. In 1974 the team won the inaugural Wiggins Teape League and the following year accomplished the Grand Slam winning all three of Leinster senior trophies. For an entire decade the Phoenix 1st XI fielded no more than fifteen players during which time it won:

1973: John Player Senior Cup

1974: Wiggins Teape Competition

1975: Leinster Senior League / John Player Senior Cup / Wiggins Teape Competition

1976: John Player Senior Cup

1977: John Player Senior Cup

1978: Leinster Senior League / John Player Senior Cup

1979: Leinster Senior League / John Player Senior Cup

By 1980, when Phoenix C.C. celebrated its 150 years jubilee, the club fielded 4 teams in Leinster men's cricket, 2 schoolboys XIs (under 13s and under 15s) and 2 Ladies XIs.

In 1975, the inaugural women's team was formed, and became the first women's cricket team in Ireland. Barbara Schmidt became the first female president of an Irish cricket club in 1989.

Fans, affectionately known as “The Flamers,” have recently adopted a reworded version of Eternal Flame by The Bangles as the club anthem.

== Honours ==
- Irish Senior Cup: 2
  - 1986, 2024
- Leinster Senior League: 15
  - 1921, 1922, 1924, 1925, 1936, 1942, 1943, 1949, 1956, 1975, 1978, 1979, 1983, 1985, 1987
- Leinster Senior Cup: 15
  - 1937, 1938, 1939, 1945, 1947, 1948, 1949, 1951, 1973, 1975, 1976, 1977, 1978, 1979, 1982

== Current squad ==
- Players with international caps are listed in **bold**.
- *denotes players qualified to play for Ireland on residency or dual nationality.

Name	Nationality	Birth date	Batting Style	Bowling Style	Notes
Batters
Ben Thompson	Ireland		Right-handed	Right arm medium	
Johit Munjal	India*		Right-handed	Right arm medium	
Levon Shields	Ireland		Right-handed	Right arm off-break	
Ashley Bain	Ireland		Right-handed	Right arm off-break	
Andrew John	Ireland		Right-handed	Right arm medium	
Eknoor Singh	Australia		Right-handed		
All-rounders
**Tyrone Kane**	Ireland	8 July 1994 (age 31)	Right-handed	Right arm medium-fast	
**Shane Getkate**	Ireland	2 October 1991 (age 34)	Right-handed	Right arm medium-fast	Captain
**George Dockrell**	Ireland	22 July 1992 (age 33)	Right-handed	Slow left-arm orthodox	
Wicket-keepers
Nicolaas Pretorius	South Africa*	8 August 1989 (age 36)	Right-handed		
Bowlers
Amish Sidhu	India*	5 October 1996 (age 29)	Right-handed	Slow left-arm orthodox	
**Ben White**	Ireland	29 August 1998 (age 27)	Right-handed	Right arm leg-break	
Ashley Bain	South Africa*		Right-handed	Right arm fast-medium	
James Maginnis	Ireland		Right-handed	Right arm medium	
Daniel Sugrue	Ireland		Left-handed	Right arm medium	
Theo Dempsey	Ireland	1 January 1995 (age 31)	Right-handed	Right arm medium-fast	

== Coaching ==
Each year the club runs a coaching programme for people at every ability level. Coaching occurs every weekday with the juniors in the afternoon and the adults in the evening. Other members and coaches from across the various teams also help in the training.

== Stadium ==
The Phoenix ground has a pavilion, a square, full nets facilities, a bar, dressing room areas and car parking.
