= Clontarf Cricket Club =

Cricket club in Dublin, Ireland

Team information
- Founded: 1876; 150 years ago
- Home ground: Clontarf Cricket Club Ground, Previously had secondary ground at Mount Temple Comprehensive School
- Official website: https://www.clontarfcricket.com/

Clontarf Cricket Club is a cricket club in Dublin, Ireland, playing in Division 1 of the Leinster Senior League. Based at Clontarf Cricket Club Ground, Castle Avenue, with a shared clubhouse, it also has playing facilities in the grounds of Mount Temple Comprehensive School.

== History ==
The club was established in 1876, with its first ground off Vernon Avenue, then one near the meeting of the Howth Road with the coast road. Clontarf Football Club, the local rugby union club, joined them in 1892, splitting the rent and with the two sports using the same field. The two clubs moved together to the present ground location, off Castle Avenue, in 1896. The club was initially solely a junior one, and won the Junior Cup final in 1898.

The club fielded its first international player in 1903, and senior status was attained in 1908. The club suspended operations for the four years from 1914. It won the Leinster Senior League in 1926. Ladies cricket was begun in 1940, ceased in the early 1960s, and resumed in the mid-1970s.

In 1947, Clontarf Cricket Club and Clontarf Football Club (the local rugby union club) jointly purchased the Castle Avenue playing grounds, and where before 1947 the clubs shared the same field, from 1947 separate pitches were designated for cricket and rugby. At first the cricket club played nearer Castle Avenue, and the rugby club further away, but they later swapped playing areas. The ground is one of just three One-Day International grounds in Ireland.

== Current squad ==
- Players with international caps are listed in **bold**.
- *denotes players qualified to play for Ireland on residency or dual nationality.

Name	Nationality	Birth date	Batting Style	Bowling Style	Notes
Batsmen
Eoghan Delany	Ireland	26 February 1989 (age 37)	Right-handed	Right arm off break	
Sam Morgan	New Zealand	17 July 2003 (age 23)	Right-handed	Right arm off break	Overseas Pro
David Vincent	Ireland	17 April 2003 (age 23)	Right-handed	Right arm off-break	Dublin University Dual Player
Mitchell Thompson	Ireland	12 November 2001 (age 24)	Right-handed	Right arm leg break	
All-rounders
**Fionn Hand**	Ireland	1 July 1998 (age 28)	Right-handed	Right arm fast-medium	Captain
John McNally	Ireland	17 April 2005 (age 21)	Left-handed	Right arm medium	
**Curtis Campher**	Ireland	20 April 1999 (age 27)	Right-handed	Right arm fast-medium	
**David Delany**	Ireland	28 December 1997 (age 28)	Left-handed	Right arm fast	Dublin University Dual Player
Ethan Marshall	Ireland		Right-handed	Right arm medium	
Wicket-keepers
**PJ Moor**	Ireland	2 February 1991 (age 35)	Right-handed	—	
Seamus Lynch	Ireland	10 August 2002 (age 24)	Right-handed		
Robert Forrest	Ireland	25 May 1993 (age 33)	Right-handed	—	
Bowlers
Reuben Wilson	Ireland	17 September 2006 (age 19)	Right-handed	Right arm fast-medium	
Cillian McDonnell	Ireland	15 October 1996 (age 29)	Left-handed	Slow left-arm orthodox	
Yash Bala	Ireland	25 November 2004 (age 21)	Right-handed	Right arm off break	Dublin University Dual Player
Luke Thompson	Ireland		Right-handed	Right arm medium	

== Notable players ==
- Louis Jacobson, batsman, played for Ireland, and was President of Clontarf from 1966 to 1968.
- Noel Mahony, player, coach and administrator, also played rugby for Clontarf F.C.
- Alec O'Riordan, former international cricketer
- Andrew Poynter, former Irish international cricketer
- Deryck Vincent, Clontarf and Irish international cricketer

== Honours ==
- Irish Senior Cup: 1
  - 2013
- Leinster Senior League: 13
  - 1926, 1961, 1972, 1991, 1992, 1995, 1996, 1999, 2000, 2007, 2009, 2015, 2016
- Leinster Senior Cup: 15
  - 1943, 1950, 1969, 1992, 1995, 2000, 2004, 2007, 2008, 2009, 2012, 2014, 2015, 2018, 2023
