= Carlisle Cricket Club Ground =

Cricket ground in Kimmage, Dublin, Ireland

Coordinates: 53.31398°N 6.30473°W

Ground information
- Location: Dublin, Ireland
- Establishment: 1970

International information
- Only WODI: 21 July 1996: Ireland v New Zealand
- As of 3 September 2020; Source: Ground profile

Carlisle Cricket Club Ground was a cricket ground in Kimmage, South Dublin, Ireland.

The grounds were built by members of the Jewish Community and finally opened in March 1954. Other sports such as Soccer, Rugby, Tennis were played on the grounds.

The first recorded senior league match on the ground was in 1970, when Carlisle joined the Senior League status.

South Leinster played North West in 1970 there also.

July 1990 saw the ground host its first International when Ireland played host to Wales for a 3 Day International Match.

The ground also hosted a single Women's One Day International match which saw Ireland women played New Zealand in 1996.

In local domestic cricket, the ground was the home ground of South Leinster, as well as Carlisle Cricket Club. Sometime after the final recorded match on the ground in 1998, the ground was sold to Ben Dunne for development as a Gym and is today called "Carlisle Gym".
