= Merrion Cricket Club =

Merrion

Personnel
- Captain: Sean Stanton
- Coach: Dominick Joyce
- Overseas player: Corne Botha
- Manager: Hussein Manack

Team information
- Colours: Lincoln green, gold and maroon
- Founded: 1906
- Home ground: Anglesea Road Cricket Ground

Merrion Cricket Club is a cricket club in Dublin, Ireland, playing in Division 1 of the Leinster Senior League.

The club was established as Merrion Wanderers and then Land Commission in 1879, moving to its present ground in 1906. Until 1919, membership of the club was restricted to civil servants. Senior status was attained in 1926.

Merrion has a large number of teams (seven men, three women, three social and boys and girls teams for all age groups) catering for all standards and interests.

== Current Squad ==
- Players with international caps are listed in **bold**.
- *denotes players qualified to play for Ireland on residency or dual nationality.

Name	Nationality	Birth date	Batting Style	Bowling Style	Notes
Batsmen
**John Anderson**	Ireland	6 October 1982 (age 43)	Right-handed	Right arm off break	
Swapnil Modgill	India*	24 November 1998 (age 27)	Right-handed	Right arm off break	Vice Captain
Jamie Forbes	Ireland	1 February 2004 (age 22)	Left-handed	Slow left-arm orthodox	Dublin University Dual Player
All-rounders
Sean Stanton	Ireland		Right-handed	Right arm medium	Captain
Seb Dijkstra	Ireland	3 July 2007 (age 18)	Right-handed	Right arm leg break	
Andrew Doheny	Ireland		Right-handed	Right arm medium	
Daniel Forkin	Ireland	10 May 2005 (age 20)	Right-handed	Slow left-arm orthodox	
Wicket-keepers
**Stephen Doheny**	Ireland	10 September 1996 (age 29)	Right-handed	—	
JJ Cassidy	Ireland		Right-handed	—	Dublin University Dual Player
Bowlers
Corne Botha	South Africa	1 February 2007 (age 19)	Right-handed	Right arm fast-medium	Overseas Pro
Tom Ford	Ireland	20 September 2006 (age 19)	Right-handed	Right arm fast-medium	
Tom Stanton	Ireland	21 September 1997 (age 28)	Right-handed	Slow left-arm orthodox	
Mikey O'Reilly	Ireland	2 July 2002 (age 23)	Left-handed	Left arm fast-medium	Dublin University Dual Player
Hugh Kennedy	Ireland		Right-handed	Right arm medium	
Melvin Christoper Devaraj	India*	31 December 2001 (age 24)	Right-handed	Right arm fast-medium	

== Honours ==
- Irish Senior Cup: 2
  - 2010, 2016
- Leinster Senior League: 7
  - 1940, 1945, 1952, 1958, 2001, 2018, 2021
- Leinster Senior League Cup: 3
  - 1940, 1960, 2011, 2021

== Home Ground ==
Merrion Cricket Club play their home games at Anglesea Road, in Ballsbridge, Dublin 4. The ground has hosted a single List-A match which saw Papua New Guinea play the United States. The ground has also hosted Women's One Day Internationals and Women's Twenty20 Internationals. It is occasionally used by the Leinster Lightning for First-class matches, and by Cricket Leinster for other Youth and Women representative teams. The ground is managed by GM by Choice.

Anglesea Road has a pavilion, a square, full nets facilities, a bar, dressing room areas and car parking.

The club's lower division, youth and women's teams occasionally use their secondary ground in Bird Avenue, Clonskeagh, which is owned by Catholic University School.
