= Irish Senior Cup (cricket) =

Fifty-over cricket competition

The Bob Kerr Irish Senior Cup, known for sponsorship reasons as the Bulters Bob Kerr Irish Senior Cup, is a 50-over cricket competition for Irish amateur clubs. It is the most important knock-out cricket club competition in Ireland, is organised by Cricket Ireland and comprises the top teams from each of Ireland's four active provincial unions (Leinster, Munster, NCU and North West). Connacht Cricket Union, the youngest, smallest and weakest provincial union, do not enter teams in their own right, but County Galway CC enters as a member club in Munster.

Matches are of 50-overs duration, though this may be reduced to as few as ten overs per side where delays or interruptions necessitate.

Each team must contain not less than nine players fully eligible to play for Ireland in all competitions.

Waringstown are the most successful club in the competition with 6 wins.

Pembroke Cricket Club are the defending champions, having defeated CSNI Cricket Club by 133 run in the 2026 final.

== Sponsorship ==
It was sponsored initially by Schweppes and then Royal Liver, RSA, Clear Currency and the current sponsor is Butlers. It was renamed in honour of Bob Kerr, who died at the 2007 Cricket World Cup.

== Summary of finalists ==
Performance Table
Team	Wins	Runners-up	Total Finals	Last Win
Waringstown	6	3	9	2018
North County	5	0	5	2008
Limavady	3	2	5	2004
North Down	3	2	5	1995
Lurgan	3	0	3	1990
Merrion	2	5	7	2016
Brigade	2	3	5	1999
Leinster	2	3	5	2023
The Hills	2	2	4	2014
Downpatrick	2	0	2	1991
Phoenix	2	0	2	2024
Donemana	1	4	5	2000
Railway Union	1	3	4	2006
North of Ireland	1	2	3	1982
Strabane	1	2	3	1998
CIYMS	1	0	1	2022
Malahide	1	0	1	2002
Clontarf	1	3	4	2013
Pembroke	1	0	1	2019
St Johnston	1	0	1	1987
Balbriggan	1	0	1	2025
Rush	0	2	2	N/A
Ballymena	0	1	1	N/A
Bready	0	1	1	N/A
Cliftonville	0	1	1	N/A
Instonians	0	1	1	N/A
Lisburn	0	1	1	N/A
Sion Mills	0	1	1	N/A

== List of finals ==
=== 1980s ===
Season	Winners	Runners-Up	Venue	Match Notes
1982	North of Ireland	Leinster	Rathmines, Dublin	North 91–4; Leinster 77–9 (S Corlett 4–26). North won by 14 runs. Match reduced to 30 overs per side.
1983	Waringstown	North of Ireland	Ormeau, Belfast	Waringstown 190–8 (D Harrison 60); North 118 all out. Waringstown won by 72 runs.
1984	Lurgan	Brigade	Rathmines, Dublin	Lurgan 257–6 (Rahul Mankad 130, P McCrum 56); Brigade 170 all out. Lurgan won by 87 runs.
1985	Downpatrick	North Down	Strangford Road, Downpatrick	North Down 79 all out; Downpatrick 85–4.Downpatrick won by 6 wickets.
1986	Phoenix	Donemana	Rathmines, Dublin	Donemana 109 all out; Phoenix 110–1 (A Masood 51). Phoenix won by 9 wickets.
1987	St Johnston	Brigade	Beechgrove, Derry	Brigade 93 all out; St Johnston 94–3. St Johnston won by 7 wickets.
1988	Lurgan	North Down	Rathmines, Dublin	Lurgan 249–6 (G Hunter 100, S Kshirasgar 61); North Down 153 all out. Lurgan won by 96 runs.
1989	North Down	Donemana	Rathmines, Dublin	Donemana 101 all out; North Down 102–6. North Down won by 4 wickets.

=== 1990s ===
Season	Winners	Runners-Up	Venue	Match Notes
1990	Lurgan	Clontarf	Rathmines, Dublin	Lurgan 251–9 (R McCollum 91, D Neill 52); Clontarf 178 all out. Lurgan won by 73 runs.
1991	Downpatrick	North of Ireland	The Green, Comber	Downpatrick 203–6 (K Merchant 60 no); North 200–8. Downpatrick won by 3 runs.
1992	Waringstown	Sion Mills	Rathmines, Dublin	Waringstown 171–5; Sion Mills 122 all out. Waringstown won by 49 runs.
1993	North Down	Brigade	Rathmines, Dublin	Brigade 155–9; North Down 156–3 (C McCrum 87). North Down won by 7 wickets.
1994	Limavady	Strabane	Woodvale Road, Eglinton	Strabane 159 all out (P Gillespie 55; Limavady 160–6 (D Curry 111 no). Limavady won by 4 wickets.
1995	North Down	Bready	The Green, Comber	North Down 227–3 (P McCrum 100 no, Robin Haire 64 no); Bready 226 all out (A Rutherford 70). North Down won by 1 run.
1996	Brigade	Leinster	Rathmines, Dublin	Leinster 199–6 (JV Byrne 56, JE Byrne 53); Brigade 201–2 (C Jeffrey 84 no, Akram Raza 67). Brigade won by 8 wickets.
1997	Limavady	Leinster	Beechgrove, Derry	Leinster 172–6 (T McDonnell 50); Limavady 174–0 (D Curry 102 no, D Cooke 64 no). Limavady won by 10 wickets.
1998	Strabane	Ballymena	Beechgrove, Derry	Strabane 189–4; Ballymena 165 all out (Mark Gillespie 5–33). Strabane won by 24 runs.
1999	Brigade	Limavady	Beechgrove, Derry	Limavady 162 all out; Brigade 163–6 (S Smyth 55). Brigade won by 4 wickets.

=== 2000s ===
Season	Winners	Runners-Up	Venue	Match Notes
2000	Donemana	Limavady	Beechgrove, Derry	Limavady 215–8 (50 overs G Harron 83 no); Donemana 219–7 (49.1 overs, W Porterfield 59); Donemana won by 3 wickets.
2001	North County	Cliftonville	The Lawn, Waringstown	North County 272–7 (A Botha 66, J Mooney 61); Cliftonville 198–9 (K McCallan 60). North County won by 74 runs.
2002	Malahide	Rush	Castle Avenue	Rush 148 all out; Malahide 149–6 (N Shaukat 4–26). Malahide won by 4 wickets.
2003	North County	Railway Union	Castle Avenue	North County 217–7 (E Morgan 70); Railway Union 146 all out (C Mullen 58, P Mooney 4–19). North County won by 71 runs.
2004	Limavady	Strabane	Woodvale Road, Eglinton	Limavady 198–6 (50 overs, I McGregor 89); Strabane 110 all out (42.1 overs). Limavady won by 88 runs.
2005	North County	Railway Union	Castle Avenue	Railway Union 182–8 (50 overs A Murphy 80); North County 185–5 (44.2 overs J Mooney 57 no). North County won by 5 wickets.
2006	Railway Union	Rush	Castle Avenue	Rush 206–7 (50 overs, S Iqbal 58); Railway Union 210–9 (43.2 overs A Murphy 50, N Mullen 4–32). Railway Union won by 1 wicket.
2007	North County	The Hills	Castle Avenue	North County 259–8 (50 overs, A Botha 84); The Hills 154 all out (B Archer 52; R Lawrence 5–38). North County won by 105 runs.
2008	North County	Donemana	Strabane	North County 165–8 (Conor Armstrong 68; Junior McBrine 4–42); Donemana 112 all out. North County won by 43 runs.
2009	Leinster	Donemana	Milverton	Leinster 265–8 (50 overs A Scholtz 75, JP O'Dwyer 61); Donemana 238 all out (48.4 overs R Kee 61, A Shafique 55, R Miley 4–46). Leinster won by 27 runs.

=== 2010s ===
Season	Winners	Runners-Up	Venue	Match Notes
2010	Merrion	Railway Union	Balrothery	Railway Union 317/3 (50 overs, Kevin O'Brien 76, Trent Johnston 71, Tom Fisher 69, Kenny Carroll 46; John Anderson 1/29, Simon Morrissey 1-41); Merrion 164/1 (26 overs, Greg Clarence 80*, Dominick Joyce 72*; Trent Johnston 1-28). Merrion won by 36 runs. (DLS par score: 128 in 26 overs)
2011	Waringstown	Instonians	The Green, Comber	Instonians 237/8 (50 overs, Andrew White 76, James Shannon 51, Gary Kidd 2/35) Waringstown 125/2 (29 overs, Simon Harrison 68, Lee Nelson 36, Neil Hamilton 1-13). Waringstown won by 21 runs (DLS par score: 104 in 29 overs).
2012	The Hills	Merrion	Castle Avenue	Merrion 153 (48 overs, Dominick Joyce 51, John Anderson 47; Naseer Shoukat 3-16) The Hills 154/2 (39.1 overs, Darryl Calder 64*, Mike Baumgart 36, Damien Poder 1-21). The Hills won by 8 wickets.
2013	Clontarf	Merrion	Malahide	Merrion 253/7 (50 overs, Brett Thompson 78, John Anderson 87, Dominick Joyce 51*, Zander van der Merwe 4-46) Clontarf 254/4 (49 overs, Andrew Poynter 102*, Eoghan Delany 42*, Andre Botha 42, Simon Morrissey 2-58); Clontarf won by 6 wickets.
2014	The Hills	Clontarf	Castle Avenue	The Hills 239 (50 overs, Cormac McLoughlin-Gavin 75, Mike Baumgart 62, Zander Van Merwe 4-30) Clontarf 230 (41 overs, Adrian D'Arcy 51, Andrew Poynter 41, Eoghan Delany 41, Naseer Shoukat 3-40); The Hills won by 9 runs.
2015	Waringstown	Merrion	The Lawn, Waringstown	Waringstown 276/7 (Greg Thompson 78, Lee Nelson 44, JP de Villiers 31, Kyle McCallan 30*, Dominick Joyce 4-62) Merrion 169 (David Langford-Smith 70, Michael Lewis 52*, JP de Villiers 4-24, Gary Kidd 2-44, Kyle McCallan 3-30); Waringstown won by 107 runs.
2016	Merrion	Waringstown	Castle Avenue	Merrion 252-9 (John Anderson 109, Dominick Joyce 67, Phil Eaglestone 3-57, Cobus Pienaar 2-39) Waringstown 196 (Lee Nelson 48, James Hall 37, David Dawson 28, Will von Behr 3-38, Tyrone Kane 2-25, David Langford-Smith 2-28); Merrion won by 51 runs.
2017	Waringstown	The Hills	Bready	The Hills 135 (Mark Donegan 40, Max Sorensen 24*, Hamid Shah 20; Kyle McCallan 3/18, Shaheen Khan 2/14, Phil Eaglestone 2/21) Waringstown 136/6 (Adam Dennison 45, Greg Thompson 24*, James Hall 22; Yaqoob Ali 4/25, Ryan Cartwright 2/33); Waringstown won by 4 wickets.
2018	Waringstown	Merrion	Stormont	Waringstown 264/7 (50 overs James Hall 73, Shaheen Khan 71*; John Anderson 3-28) Merrion 179 (42.1 overs Michael Lewis 46; Shaheen Khan 2-23, Gary Kidd 2-35); Waringstown won by 85 runs.
2019	Pembroke	Waringstown	Milverton	Pembroke 316/7 (50 overs Shaheen Khan 101, Theo Lawson 63, Haseeb Azam 2-40) Waringstown 181 (30.1 overs Greg Thompson 45, James Mitchell 29, Jack Balbirnie 4-52); Pembroke won by 135 runs.

=== 2020s ===
Season	Winners	Runners-Up	Venue	Match Notes
2020	Not played			
2021	Not played			
2022	CIYMS	Lisburn	Bready	CIYMS 321-6 (50 overs; John Matchett 94, Chris Dougherty 93; Jason van der Merwe 49, Ross Adair 32; Neil Whitworth 2-63, Mark Berry 2-65) Lisburn 96 (26.2 overs; Faiz Fazal 30, David Simpson 20; Nigel Jones 3–15, Jacob Mulder 2-8, Graham Kennedy 2-9); CIYMS won by 225 runs
2023	Leinster	Waringstown	The Lawn	Leinster 259-6 (50 overs; Joe Carroll 78, Peter Francis 74*, Saqib Bahadur 42, Gareth Delany 35; Graham Hume 2-35, Ben Snell 2-45) Waringstown 211 (45 overs; Morgan Topping 110, Patrick Botha 32; Peter Francis 3-24, Bilal Azhar 3-45, Saqib Bahudur 2-40); Leinster won by 48 runs
2024	Phoenix	Merrion	The Mardyke, Cork	Phoenix 211 (44.2 overs; Tyrone Kane 44*, Levon Shields 40, Nicolaas Pretorius 37, Jack Lalor 21; Peter Francis 3-37, Max Sorensen 2-41, Melvin Devaraj 2-61) Merrion 210 (49.5 overs; Samuel Harbinson 60, Swapnil Modgill 42, John Anderson 39; Ben White 5-34, Amish Sidhu 2-31, George Dockrell 2-40); Phoenix Cricket Club won by 1 run
2025	Balbriggan	Clontarf	Bready	Balbriggan 331-6 (50 overs; Jordan Hollard 100*, Farooq Nasr 86*, Sebastian De Oliveira 65, John McNally 4-56, David Delany 1-51, Cillian McDonnell 1-56) Clontarf 211 (45 overs; John McNally 68, Mitchell Thompson 60, Eoghan Delany 48, Jordan Hollard 2-49, Sebastian De Oliveira 2-71, Kashif Ali 1-24); Balbriggan won by 12 runs
2026	Pembroke	CSNI	Clontarf	Pembroke 306-8 (50 overs; JJ Garth 117, Andrew Balbirnie 73, Macdara Cosgrave 35, Jack Tector 20, James West 4-45, Adam Leckey 2-85, Harry Dyer 1-69) CSNI 173 (36.4 overs; Ryan Hunter 46, Stuart Thompson 32, Harry Dyer 22*, Adam Leckey 21, Paul Lawson 3-26, Addison Sherriff 2-13, Tim Tector 2-42); Pembroke won by 133 runs

== Summary of winners ==
=== By province ===
Province	Wins
Leinster	21
NCU	16
North West	8
Connacht	0
Munster	0

=== By country ===
	Wins
Northern Ireland	23
Republic of Ireland	22

== See also ==
- Leinster Senior League
- NCU Senior League
- North West Senior League
- Ulster Cup
