= North West Senior Cup (cricket) =

Provincial cricket competition in Ireland

The North West Senior Cup is the most important provincial cricket knock-out cup of the North West jurisdiction in Ireland. The competition is open to teams playing in the North West Senior League. It is sponsored by Bank of Ireland and marketed as the Bank of Ireland Senior Cup.

The competition began in 1888 as the County Londonderry Senior Cup, with twelve clubs entering the first competition in which Limavady beat Donemana in the first final at St Columb's Court, Lone Moor Road, Derry. The cup was organised on a league basis between 1894 and 1897, and there was no competition between 1898 and 1902. It became the North West Senior Cup in 2007.

== List of winners ==
=== 1880s ===
Season	Winners	Runners-up
1888	Limavady	Donemana
1889	Sion Mills	Donemana

=== 1890s ===
Season	Winners	Runners-up	Notes
1890	Sion Mills	Strabane	
1891	Ebrington	Limavady	
1892	Sion Mills	Strabane	Final not played. Strabane declined to play at the Bond's Field venue in Londonderry because the final involved two County Tyrone teams.
1893	Ebrington	Dunboe	
1894	Sion Mills		
1895	Ballymoney		
1896	Sion Mills		
1897	Ballymoney		
1898	no competition		
1899	no competition		

=== 1900s ===
Season	Winners	Runners-up
1900	no competition	
1901	no competition	
1902	no competition	
1903	Strabane	Clooney
1904	Sion Mills	Clooney
1905	Sion Mills	Clooney
1906	Clooney	Waterside
1907	Clooney	Buncrana
1908	Clooney	Idlers
1909	Clooney	Strabane

=== 1910s ===
Season	Winners	Runners-up
1910	Clooney	City of Derry
1911	Clooney	Waterside
1912	Strabane	Royal Scots Fusiliers
1913	Sion Mills	City of Derry
1914	Sion Mills	City of Derry
1915–1918	no competition	
1919	Dorsetshire Regiment	City of Derry

=== 1920s ===
Season	Winners	Runners-up
1920	City of Derry	Waterside
1921	Church Lads' Brigade	Sion Mills
1922	City of Derry	Strabane
1923	City of Derry	Sion Mills
1924	City of Derry	Waterside
1925	Strabane	Brigade
1926	Sion Mills	Killaloo
1927	City of Derry	Fawney
1928	Fawney	Waterside
1929	City of Derry	Waterside

=== 1930s ===
Season	Winners	Runners-up
1930	Brigade	Waterside
1931	Sion Mills	City of Derry
1932	City of Derry	St Johnston
1933	City of Derry	Strabane
1934	Sion Mills	Brigade
1935	Sion Mills	City of Derry
1936	Strabane	Ardmore
1937	Strabane	Brigade
1938	Strabane	Sion Mills
1939	Brigade	City of Derry

=== 1940s ===
Season	Winners	Runners-up
1940	Sion Mills	St Johnston
1941	Strabane	City of Derry
1942	no competition	
1943	Brigade	Strabane
1944	Eglinton	Strabane
1945	Sion Mills	Donemana
1946	Brigade	Eglinton
1947	Sion Mills	Brigade
1948	Eglinton	Brigade
1949	Sion Mills	Donemana

=== 1950s ===
Season	Winners	Runners-up
1950	Donemana	Sion Mills
1951	Sion Mills	Brigade
1952	Sion Mills	Strabane
1953	Eglinton	Ardmore
1954	Eglinton	Donemana
1955	Sion Mills	Eglinton
1956	Eglinton	Donemana
1957	Sion Mills	Strabane
1958	Donemana	Ardmore
1959	St Johnston	Donemana

=== 1960s ===
Season	Winners	Runners-up	Match scores
1960	Sion Mills	Brigade	Brigade 69 all out & 141 all out; Sion Mills 186 all out & 26–2. Sion Mills won by 8 wickets.
1961	Sion Mills	Limavady	Limavady 94 all out & 173 all out. Sion Mills 133 all out & 136–6. Sion Mills won by 4 wickets.
1962	Sion Mills	Limavady	Limavady 166 all out & 84 all out. Sion Mills 56–8 & 195–5. Sion Mills won by 5 wickets.
1963	Donemana	Strabane	Strabane 1st Innings 175 all out (Cunningham 5–30); 2nd Innings; Donemana 1st Innings; 2nd Innings
1964	Donemana	Brigade	Donemana 1st Innings 231 all out (J Cochrane 112; M Williamson 4–59); 2nd Innings 203 all out (D Todd 6–49). Brigade 1st Innings 148 all out; 2nd Innings 212 all out. Donemana won by 74 runs.
1965	Limavady	Donemana	
1966	Strabane	Ardmore	
1967	Donemana	Ardmore	
1968	Eglinton	Donemana	
1969	Donemana	Eglinton	

=== 1970s ===
Season	Winners	Runners-up	Match scores
1970	Sion Mills	Eglinton	
1971	Sion Mills	Strabane	
1972	Brigade	Ardmore	
1973	Brigade	Eglinton	
1974	Donemana	Waterside	
1975	St Johnston	Ardmore	
1976	Donemana	Eglinton	
1977	Brigade	Sion Mills	
1978	St Johnston	Strabane	
1979	Sion Mills	Brigade	

=== 1980s ===
Season	Winners	Runners-up	Match scores
1980	Limavady	Sion Mills	
1981	Donemana	Eglinton	
1982	St Johnston	Strabane	
1983	Sion Mills	Ardmore	
1984	Sion Mills	Brigade	
1985	Donemana	Brigade	
1986	Coleraine	Strabane	
1987	Strabane	Donemana	
1988	Donemana	Bready	
1989	Donemana	Bready	

=== 1990s ===
Season	Winners	Runners-up	Match scores
1990	Eglinton	Limavady	
1991	Brigade	Eglinton	
1992	Donemana	Bready	
1993	Strabane	Brigade	
1994	Ardmore	Eglinton	
1995	Eglinton	Crindle	Eglinton 1st Innings 285–7 (N Thompson 61); 2nd Innings 317–4 (H Wallace 144, S Smyth 100 no). Crindle 1st Innings 107 all out; 2nd Innings 236–8 (N McElwee 99). Eglinton won by 259 runs.
1996	Bready	Strabane	Strabane 1st Innings 220–8 (A Proverbs 63); 2nd Innings 140 all out (A Cilliers 5–30). Bready 1st Innings 219–8 (A Cilliers 91); 2nd Innings 143–2 (A Cilliers 52 no, B Doherty 52). Bready won by 8 wickets.
1997	Limavady	Bready	Bready 114 all out; 2nd Innings 187–9. Limavady 1st Innings 192 all out (I McGregor 72, G Cooke 51; A Cilliers 6–50, G McConnell 4–33); 2nd Innings 112–0 (D Curry 85 no). Limavady won by 10 wickets.
1998	Brigade	Ardmore	Ardmore 1st Innings 198–5 (P Brolly 94 no); 2nd Innings 17 all out (M Simpson 5–7, W Wilson 5–10). Brigade 1st Innings 134 all out (I Hussain 4–22); 2nd Innings 82–5. Brigade won by 5 wickets.
1999	Limavady	Donemana	Donemana 1st Innings 234 all out; 2nd Innings 239–7 (J McBrine 61). Limavady 1st Innings 280–6 (J Narse 135, D Curry 50); 2nd Innings 196–2 (D Curry 128 no). Limavady won by 8 wickets.

=== 2000s ===
Season	Winners	Runners-up	Match scores
2000	Limavady	Brigade	Brigade 1st Innings 154–6 (G Cooke 66 no); 2nd Innings 222 all out (D Cooke 87; R McDaid 4–50). Limavady 1st Innings 265–5 (J Narse 102); 2nd Innings 112–1. Limavady won by 9 wickets.
2001	Donemana	Limavady	Donemana 1st Innings 243–6 (A Shaffique 83, W Porterfield 57); 2nd Innings 211–9. Limavady 216–9 (D Curry 84, I Hussain 53; J McBrine 4–32; 2nd Innings 72 all out (A Shaffique 5–28, G Neely 4–29). Donemana won by 166 runs.
2002	Limavady	Bready	Limavady 1st Innings 272–8 (D Curry 108, R McDaid 58); 2nd Innings 313–7 (D Curry 108, I McGregor 54). Bready 1st Innings 214–9 (M Olphert 64, W Smit 58); 2nd Innings 192 all out. Limavady won by 180 runs.
2003	Limavady	Glendermott	Glendermott 1st Innings 147 all out (47.1 overs, J Thompson 66); 2nd Innings 219 all out (48.4 overs, V Gunawardene 85). Limavady 349–5 (50 overs, K Akmal 160, R McDaid 53, I McGregor 50); 2nd Innings 18–0 (3.5 overs). Limavady won by 10 wickets.
2004	Donemana	Strabane	Strabane 1st Innings 152 all out (49.1 overs); 2nd Innings 264–8 (50 overs, P Gillespie 87, M Gillespie 58). Donemana 1st Innings 266 all out (49.5 overs, A Shaffique 129, A McBrine 60, B Rao 4–37); 2nd Innings 154–2 (26.1 overs, A Shaffique 72, D McGerrigle 54 no). Donemana won by 8 wickets.
2005	Glendermott	Ballyspallen	Ballyspallen 1st Innings 145 all out; 2nd Innings 210 all out (M Mooney 4–24). Glendermott 208 all out (R Robinson 82); 2nd Innings 150–4 (P Mullick 96 no). Glendermott won by 6 wickets.
2006	Eglinton	Strabane	Eglinton 1st Innings 252–5 (50 overs, J Bray 102); 2nd Innings 204–7 (50 overs). Strabane 1st Innings 213–5 (50 overs, P Gillespie 72 no, P McNamee 63); 2nd Innings 148–9 (50 overs J Brown 4–18). Eglinton won by 95 runs.
2007	Limavady	Glendermott	Glendermott 1st Innings 128 all out (38.3 overs, S Dunn 5–26); 2nd Innings 268–5 (50 overs, H Raza 146 no). Limavady 1st Innings 310–5 (50 overs, I McGregor 105, D Curry 75); 2nd Innings 88–2 (22.3 overs). Limavady won by 8 wickets.
2008	Limavady	Brigade	Brigade 1st Innings 167–9 (50 overs); 2nd Innings 213–8 (50 overs I Hussain 80, R Wylie 58). Limavady 1st Innings 172–7 (50 overs R McDaid 66 no); 2nd Innings 211–7 (48.2 overs D Cooke 59 no). Limavady won by 3 wickets.
2009	Donemana	Bready	Bready 1st Innings 151–8 (50 overs); 2nd Innings 169–7 (50 overs). Donemana 1st Innings 232 all out (48.5 overs, C Young 5–53); 2nd Innings 90–5 (31.1 overs). Donemana won by 5 wickets.

=== 2010s ===
Season	Winners	Runners-up	Match scores
2010	Brigade	Strabane	Brigade 1st innings 268–7 (50 overs C Dougherty 65, N McDonnell 51); 2nd innings 270–7 (50 overs C Dougherty 83, G McKeegan 53, I Hussain 50; J Beukes 4–51). Strabane 1st innings 248–8 (50 overs P Gillespie 103, M Gillespie 65); 2nd innings 193 all out (43 overs, K Martin 82; M Simpson 4–34). Brigade won by 97 runs.
2011	Bready	Donemana	Bready 1st innings 304–7 (50 overs D Rankin 126, B Crumley 100; K Sajid 4–53); 2nd innings 251–5 (50 overs S Clarke 56. Donemana 1st innings 249–8 (50 overs K Sajid 81 no); 2nd innings 241 all out. Bready won by 69 runs.
2012	Donemana	Brigade	Brigade 248–6 (50.0 overs, G McKeegan 102, H Chappell 42, I Hussain 28, K Sajid 2–44, Jun McBrine 2–51) and 110 (39.4 overs, Jas McBrine 4–15, W McBrine 3–12, K Sajid 2–44); Donemana 255–5 (50.0 overs, K Sajid 61, RL Dougherty 54, G Boyd 26, J Thompson 2–48) and 104–5 (35.4 overs, RL Dougherty 28, J Thompson 4–32); Donemana won by 5 wickets
2013	Donemana	Brigade	Brigade 228–5 (50.0 overs, G McKeegan 83no, J Thompson 46, A Britton 36no, A McDaid 33, A McBrine 2–41) and 102 (45.5 overs, A Britton 62, K Sajid 3–22, Jun McBrine 3–25, W McBrine 2–9); Donemana 156 (A McBrine 31, G McClintock 25, RL Dougherty 25, K Sajid 24, R Hepburn 3–25, J Thompson 3–46, S Dunn 2–28) and 174–4 (39.4 overs, A McBrine 55no, G McClintock 43, J Thompson 3–51); Donemana won by 6 wickets
2014	Donemana	Brigade	Donemana 244–7 (Riddles 45, A. McBrine 51, Britton 2/40, Dunn 2/38) and 206–8 (Sajjid 70no, Britton 2/42); Brigade 141 (Hepburn 51, A. McBrine 2/28, McGonigle 4/19) and 221 (Thompson 50, Murdock 63, Sajjid 2/28, A. McBrine 3/35, W. McBrine 2/36); Donemana won by 88 runs.
2015	Donemana	Eglinton	Eglinton 114 (Frylinck 3/27, R McBrine 3/35, McGonigle 3/21) and 181 (R Wylie 62no, Frylinck 3/25); Donemana 179–9 (G McClintock 37, R L Dougherty 36, Thompson 2/24, Williams 3/32, Allen 3/20) and 117–5 (A McBrine 65no, G McClintock 37, Thompson 3/39, Williams 2/37); Donemana won by 5 wickets.
2016	Donemana	Coleraine	Coleraine 198–4 (N McDonnell 80no, S Campbell 38, D Cooke 33, J Frylinck 2/55) and 193–9 (N McDonnell 62, S Campbell 33, M Douglas 26, W McBrine 2/28, A McBrine 2/29, R McBrine 2/47); Donemana 235–9 (A Riddles 76no, R L Dougherty 43, T Riddles 25, G Cooke 3/50, J Barnes 2/30, S Campbell 2/33) and 157–4 (A McBrine 86no, A Riddles 26, J Barnes 2/30); Donemana won by 6 wickets.
2017	Donemana	Ballyspallen	Donemana 226–8 (R L Dougherty 63, A Riddles 47, D McGerrigle 28, G McClintock 20, S McCloskey 2/35, M Averill 2/56, J Martin 2/64) and 237 (I Butt 69, G McClintock 42, D McGerrigle 22, W McClintock 20, Jun McBrine 20, M Averill 4/44, J Martin 2/23, S McCloskey 2/38); Ballyspallen 129 (M Averill 32, S Kennedy 26, I Hill-Nicholl 24, C Averill 20, J McGonigle 4/21, Jun McBrine 3/22, D McGerrigle 2/40) and 101 (S Kennedy 35, D McCallum 27, J McBrine 7/13, J McGonigle 2/12); Donemana won by 233 runs.
2018	Brigade	Eglinton	Brigade 261–7 (J Thompson 57, A Britton 50 no, D Murdoch 49, R Allen 2–29) and 188–9 (N McDonnell 50, J Thompson 47; S Thompson 4–24); Eglinton 171 (J Millar 64, J Thompson 36, M Simpson 3–33, J Thompson 3–37) and 184 (J Miller 58; A Britton 7–24); Brigade won by 94 runs.
2019	Brigade	Glendermott	Brigade won by 226 runs.

=== 2020s ===
Season	Winners	Runners-up	Match scores
2020	Donemana	Brigade	Donemana 133–6 (20 overs). Brigade 119–9 (20 overs). Donemana won by 14 runs.
2021	Brigade	Eglinton	Eglinton 170–7 and 124. Brigade 218-7 and 77-4. Brigade won by 6 wickets.
2022	Fox Lodge	Newbuildings	
2023	Brigade	Newbuildings	
2024	Newbuildings	Donemana	
2025	Donemana	Newbuildings	
2026	Newbuildings	Coleraine	

== Summary of winners ==
Team	Wins
Sion Mills	29
Donemana	24
Brigade	15
Strabane	10
Eglinton	9
Limavady	9
City of Derry	8
Clooney	6
St Johnston	4
Ballymoney	2
Bready	2
Ebrington	2
Newbuildings	2
Ardmore	1
Coleraine	1
Dorsetshire Regiment	1
Fawney	1
Fox Lodge	1
Glendermott	1

== See also ==
- North West Senior League
- Ulster Cup
- NCU Senior Cup
- Leinster Senior Cup
