= 2016 World Twenty20 squads =

List of cricketers

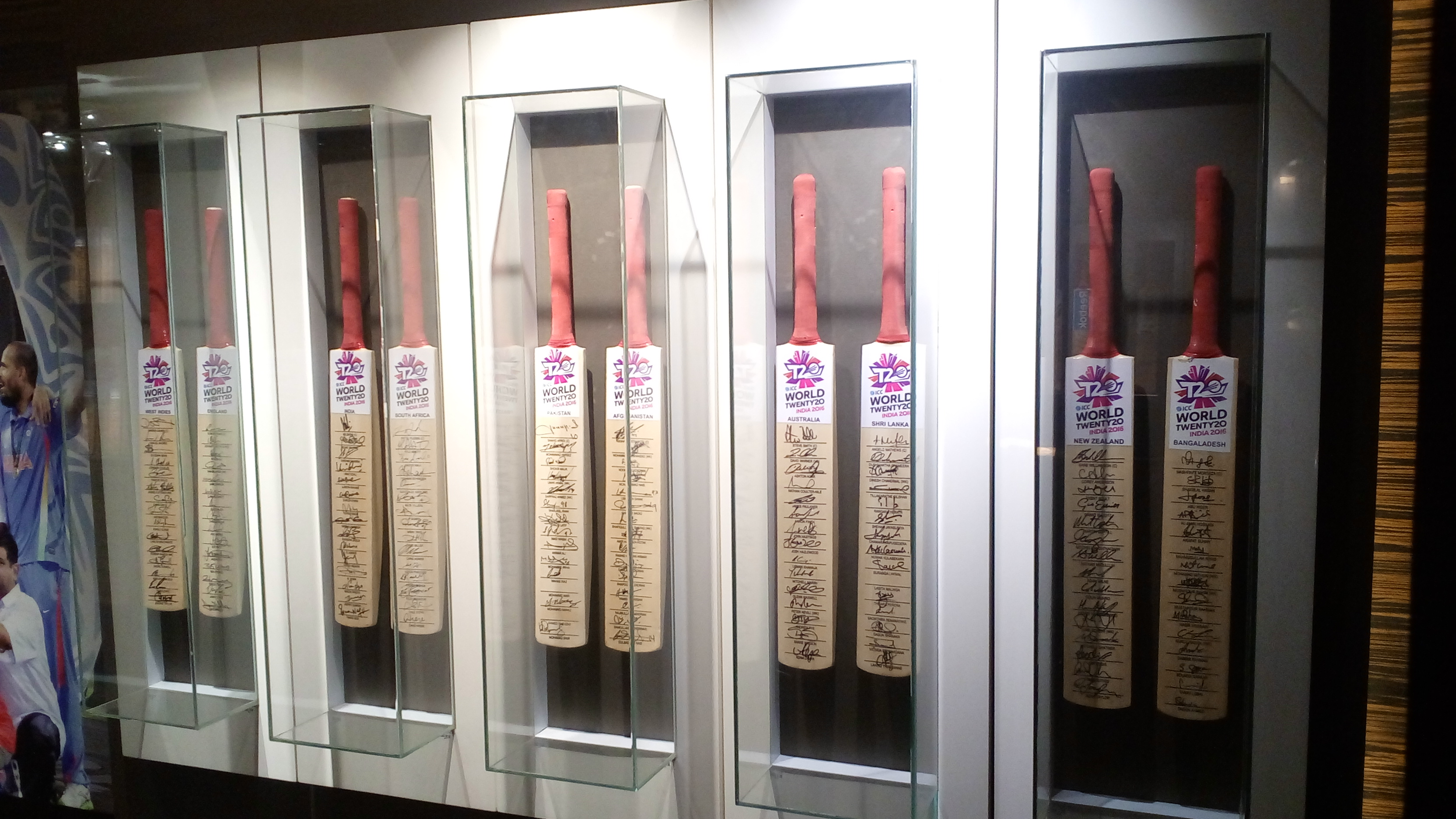
Autographed bats of teams that participated in the 2016 T20 World Cup at Blades of Glory Museum, Pune, India.

The 2016 ICC World Twenty20 was the sixth ICC World Twenty20, and the first to be hosted by India. Sri Lanka were the defending champions, having won the 2014 edition. The following squads were chosen for the tournament. The player ages are as on 8 March 2016, the opening day of the tournament, and where a player plays for more than one team in Twenty20 cricket, only their domestic team is listed (for example: at the time, Jos Buttler played for Lancashire Lightning in the T20 Blast and Mumbai Indians in the Indian Premier League).

== Afghanistan ==
Coach: (Pakistan) Inzamam-ul-Haq

No.	Player	Date of birth	Batting	Bowling style	Domestic team
44	Asghar Afghan (c)	22 February 1987 (aged 29)	Right	Right-arm fast-medium	Kabul Eagles
4	Amir Hamza	15 August 1991 (aged 24)	Left	Left-arm orthodox	Kabul Eagles
10	Dawlat Zadran	19 March 1988 (aged 27)	Right	Right-arm fast-medium	Mis Ainak Knights
14	Gulbadin Naib	16 March 1991 (aged 24)	Right	Right-arm fast-medium	Mis Ainak Knights
66	Hamid Hassan	1 June 1987 (aged 28)	Right	Right-arm fast	Speen Ghar Tigers
84	Karim Sadiq	28 February 1984 (aged 32)	Right	Right-arm off-spin	Amo Sharks
7	Mohammad Nabi	3 March 1985 (aged 31)	Right	Right-arm off-spin	Band-e-Amir Dragons
77	Mohammad Shahzad (wk)	15 July 1991 (aged 24)	Right	—	Mis Ainak Knights
1	Najibullah Zadran	18 February 1993 (aged 23)	Left	Right-arm off-spin	Boost Defenders
15	Noor Ali Zadran	10 July 1988 (aged 27)	Right	Right-arm fast-medium	Mis Ainak Knights
19	Rashid Khan	20 September 1998 (aged 17)	Right	Right-arm leg-spin	Kabul Eagles
45	Samiullah Shenwari	31 December 1987 (aged 28)	Right	Right-arm leg-spin	Speen Ghar Tigers
28	Shafiqullah Shafaq (wk)	7 August 1989 (aged 26)	Right	—	Speen Ghar Tigers
20	Shapoor Zadran	7 March 1985 (aged 31)	Left	Left-arm fast-medium	Boost Defenders
87	Usman Ghani	20 November 1996 (aged 19)	Right	—	Boost Defenders

== Australia ==
Australia announced their squad on 9 February 2016.

Coach: (Australia) Darren Lehmann

No.	Player	Date of birth	T20Is	Batting	Bowling style	Domestic team
49	Steven Smith (c)	2 June 1989 (aged 26)	23	Right	Right-arm leg break	Sydney Sixers
31	David Warner (vc)	27 October 1986 (aged 29)	54	Left	Right-arm leg break	Sunrisers Hyderabad (IPL)
33	Shane Watson (vc)	17 June 1981 (aged 34)	52	Right	Right-arm medium-fast	Sydney Thunder
46	Ashton Agar	14 October 1993 (aged 22)	1	Left	Slow left-arm orthodox	Perth Scorchers
6	Nathan Coulter-Nile	11 October 1987 (aged 28)	11	Right	Right-arm fast	Perth Scorchers
44	James Faulkner	29 April 1990 (aged 25)	13	Right	Left-arm fast-medium	Melbourne Stars
5	Aaron Finch	17 November 1986 (aged 29)	24	Right	Slow left-arm orthodox	Melbourne Renegades
41	John Hastings	4 November 1985 (aged 30)	4	Right	Right-arm fast-medium	Melbourne Stars
38	Josh Hazlewood	8 January 1991 (aged 25)	4	Left	Right-arm fast-medium	Sydney Sixers
1	Usman Khawaja	18 December 1986 (aged 29)	3	Left	Right-arm Off break bowling	Sydney Thunder
8	Mitchell Marsh	20 October 1991 (aged 24)	4	Right	Right-arm fast-medium	Perth Scorchers
32	Glenn Maxwell	14 October 1988 (aged 27)	27	Right	Right-arm off break	Melbourne Stars
20	Peter Nevill (wk)	13 October 1985 (aged 30)	3	Right	—	Melbourne Renegades
68	Andrew Tye	12 December 1986 (aged 29)	2	Right	Right-arm medium-fast	Perth Scorchers
63	Adam Zampa	31 March 1992 (aged 23)	2	Right	Right-arm leg break	Melbourne Stars

== Bangladesh ==
Bangladesh announced their squad on 3 February 2016:

Coach: (Sri Lanka) Chandika Hathurusingha

No.	Player	Date of birth	Batting	Bowling style	Domestic team
2	Mashrafe Mortaza (c)	5 October 1983 (aged 32)	Right	Right-arm fast-medium	Comilla Victorians
75	Shakib Al Hasan (vc)	24 March 1987 (aged 28)	Left	Left-arm orthodox	Rangpur Riders
14	Abu Hider	14 February 1996 (aged 20)	Right	Left-arm fast-medium	Comilla Victorians
4	Al-Amin Hossain	1 January 1990 (aged 26)	Right	Right-arm medium-fast	Barisal Bulls
30	Mahmudullah	4 February 1986 (aged 30)	Right	Right-arm off-spin	Barisal Bulls
8	Mohammad Mithun (wk)	13 February 1990 (aged 26)	Right	—	Rangpur Riders
15	Mushfiqur Rahim (wk)	9 May 1987 (aged 28)	Right	—	Sylhet Super Stars
90	Mustafizur Rahman	6 September 1995 (aged 20)	Left	Left-arm fast-medium	Dhaka Dynamites
69	Nasir Hossain	30 November 1991 (aged 24)	Right	Right-arm off-spin	Dhaka Dynamites
63	Nurul Hasan (wk)	21 November 1993 (aged 22)	Right	—	Sylhet Super Stars
1	Sabbir Rahman	22 November 1991 (aged 24)	Right	Right-arm leg-spin	Barisal Bulls
59	Soumya Sarkar	25 February 1993 (aged 23)	Left	Right-arm medium-fast	Rangpur Riders
28	Tamim Iqbal	20 March 1989 (aged 26)	Left	—	Chittagong Vikings
51	Shuvagata Hom	11 November 1986 (aged 29)	Right	Right-arm off break
9	Saqlain Sajib	1 December 1988 (aged 27)	Left	Left-arm orthodox
Withdrawn players
3	Taskin Ahmed	3 April 1995 (aged 20)	Left	Right-arm fast	Chittagong Vikings
6	Arafat Sunny	29 September 1986 (aged 29)	Left	Left-arm orthodox	Rangpur Riders

== England ==
England announced their squad on 10 February 2016:

Coach: (Australia) Trevor Bayliss

No.	Player	Date of birth	T20Is	Batting	Bowling style	Domestic team
16	Eoin Morgan (c)	10 September 1986 (aged 29)	56	Left	Right-arm medium	Middlesex
63	Jos Buttler (vc, wk)	8 September 1990 (aged 25)	42	Right	—	Lancashire Lightning
18	Moeen Ali	18 June 1987 (aged 28)	12	Left	Right-arm off break	Worcestershire
7	Sam Billings (wk)	15 June 1991 (aged 24)	6	Right	—	Kent Spitfires
83	Liam Dawson	1 March 1990 (aged 26)	0	Right	Slow left-arm orthodox	Hampshire
2	Alex Hales	3 January 1989 (aged 27)	39	Right	Right-arm medium	Nottinghamshire Outlaws
34	Chris Jordan	4 October 1988 (aged 27)	11	Right	Right-arm fast-medium	Sussex Sharks
17	Liam Plunkett	6 April 1985 (aged 30)	3	Right	Right-arm fast	Yorkshire Vikings
95	Adil Rashid	17 February 1988 (aged 28)	12	Right	Right-arm leg break	Yorkshire Vikings
66	Joe Root	30 December 1990 (aged 25)	14	Right	Right-arm off break	Yorkshire Vikings
67	Jason Roy	21 July 1990 (aged 25)	8	Right	Right-arm medium	Surrey
55	Ben Stokes	4 June 1991 (aged 24)	11	Left	Right-arm fast-medium	Durham Jets
23	Reece Topley	21 February 1994 (aged 22)	4	Right	Left-arm medium-fast	Hampshire
14	James Vince	14 March 1991 (aged 24)	3	Right	Right-arm medium	Hampshire
15	David Willey	28 February 1990 (aged 26)	5	Left	Left-arm fast-medium	Yorkshire Vikings
11	~~Steven Finn~~	4 April 1989 (aged 26)	21	Right	Right-arm fast	Middlesex

== Hong Kong ==
Hong Kong announced their squad on 28 January 2016.

Coach: (England) Simon Cook

No.	Player	Date of birth	Batting	Bowling style	Domestic team
33	Tanwir Afzal (c)	12 June 1988 (aged 27)	Right	Right-arm fast-medium	Pakistan Association
8	Mark Chapman (vc)	27 June 1994 (aged 21)	Left	Left-arm orthodox	Hong Kong CC
2	Nadeem Ahmed	28 September 1987 (aged 28)	Right	Left-arm orthodox	Little Sai Wan
–	Tanveer Ahmed	18 September 1997 (aged 18)	Right	Right-arm medium-fast	Kowloon CC
12	Haseeb Amjad	11 November 1987 (aged 28)	Right	Right-arm medium-fast	USRC
23	Jamie Atkinson (wk)	23 August 1990 (aged 25)	Right	—	Kowloon CC
73	Waqas Barkat	17 February 1990 (aged 26)	Right	Right-arm leg-spin	Kowloon CC
1	Ryan Campbell	7 February 1972 (aged 44)	Right	Right-arm off-spin	Kowloon CC
–	Christopher Carter (wk)	9 September 1997 (aged 18)	Right	—	Kowloon CC
10	Babar Hayat	5 January 1992 (aged 24)	Right	Right-arm medium	Little Sai Wan
11	Aizaz Khan	21 March 1993 (aged 22)	Right	Right-arm medium-fast	Pakistan Association
75	Nizakat Khan	8 July 1992 (aged 23)	Right	Right-arm leg-spin	Hong Kong CC
–	Waqas Khan	10 March 1999 (aged 16)	Right	Right-arm medium-fast	Little Sai Wan
13	Anshuman Rath	5 November 1997 (aged 18)	Left	Left-arm orthodox	Hong Kong CC
9	Kinchit Shah	9 December 1995 (aged 20)	Left	Right-arm off-spin	Hong Kong CC

== India ==
India announced their squad on 5 February 2016.

Team Director: (India) Ravi Shastri

No.	Player	Date of birth	Batting	Bowling	Domestic team
7	MS Dhoni (c, wk)	7 July 1981 (aged 34)	Right	Right-arm medium	Chennai Super Kings
18	Virat Kohli (vc)	5 November 1988 (aged 27)	Right	Right-arm medium	Royal Challengers Bangalore
99	Ravichandran Ashwin	17 September 1986 (aged 29)	Right	Right-arm off-spin	Chennai Super Kings
93	Jasprit Bumrah	6 December 1993 (aged 22)	Right	Right-arm fast-medium	Mumbai Indians
45	Rohit Sharma	30 April 1987 (aged 28)	Right	Right-arm off-spin	Mumbai Indians
3	Harbhajan Singh	3 July 1980 (aged 35)	Right	Right-arm off-spin	Mumbai Indians
25	Shikhar Dhawan	5 December 1985 (aged 30)	Left	Right-arm off-spin	Sunrisers Hyderabad
8	Ravindra Jadeja	6 December 1988 (aged 27)	Left	Left-arm orthodox	Chennai Super Kings
6	Pawan Negi	6 January 1993 (aged 23)	Left	Left-arm orthodox	Delhi Daredevils
64	Ashish Nehra	29 April 1979 (aged 36)	Right	Left-arm fast	Sunrisers Hyderabad
9	Manish Pandey	10 September 1989 (aged 26)	Right	Right-arm off-spin	Kolkata Knight Riders
33	Hardik Pandya	11 October 1993 (aged 22)	Right	Right arm medium-fast	Mumbai Indians
27	Ajinkya Rahane	6 June 1988 (aged 27)	Right	Right-arm medium	Rajasthan Royals
48	Suresh Raina	27 November 1986 (aged 29)	Left	Right-arm off-spin	Chennai Super Kings
11	Mohammad Shami	9 March 1990 (aged 25)	Right	Right-arm fast	Delhi Daredevils
Withdrawn players
12	Yuvraj Singh	12 December 1981 (aged 34)	Left	Left-arm orthodox	Sunrisers Hyderabad

== Ireland ==
Ireland announced their squad on 8 February 2016.

Coach: (New Zealand) John Bracewell

No.	Player	Date of birth	Batting	Bowling style	Domestic team
6	William Porterfield (c)	6 September 1984 (aged 31)	Left	Right-arm off-spin	Warwickshire
63	Andrew Balbirnie (vc)	28 December 1990 (aged 25)	Right	Right-arm off-spin	Middlesex
50	George Dockrell	22 July 1992 (aged 23)	Right	Left-arm orthodox spin	Somerset
35	Andy McBrine	30 April 1993 (aged 22)	Left	Right-arm off-spin	Donemana
34	Tim Murtagh	2 August 1981 (aged 34)	Left	Right-arm medium fast	Middlesex
22	Kevin O'Brien	4 March 1984 (aged 32)	Right	Right-arm medium fast	Leicestershire
72	Niall O'Brien (wk)	8 November 1981 (aged 34)	Left	—	Leicestershire
25	Andrew Poynter	25 April 1987 (aged 28)	Right	Right-arm off-spin	Clontarf
90	Stuart Poynter (wk)	18 October 1990 (aged 25)	Right	—	Durham
30	Boyd Rankin	5 July 1984 (aged 31)	Left	Right-arm medium fast	Warwickshire
26	Max Sorensen	18 November 1985 (aged 30)	Right	Right-arm medium fast	The Hills
1	Paul Stirling	3 September 1990 (aged 25)	Right	Right-arm off-spin	Middlesex
17	Stuart Thompson	15 August 1991 (aged 24)	Left	Right-arm medium fast	Eglinton
14	Gary Wilson (wk)	5 February 1986 (aged 30)	Right	—	Surrey
44	Craig Young	4 April 1990 (aged 25)	Right	Right-arm medium fast	Bready

== Netherlands ==
The Netherlands announced their squad on 6 February 2016.

Coach: (South Africa) Anton Roux

No.	Player	Date of birth	Batting	Bowling style	Domestic team
83	Peter Borren (c)	21 August 1983 (aged 32)	Right	Right-arm medium	VRA
8	Pieter Seelaar (vc)	2 July 1987 (aged 28)	Right	Left-arm orthodox spin	VOC Rotterdam
34	Wesley Barresi (wk)	3 May 1984 (aged 31)	Right	Right-arm off-spin	Quick Haag
7	Mudassar Bukhari	26 December 1983 (aged 32)	Right	Right-arm medium-fast	Dosti-United
32	Ben Cooper	10 February 1992 (aged 24)	Left	Right-arm medium fast	VRA
26	Tom Cooper	26 November 1986 (aged 29)	Right	Right-arm off-spin	Melbourne Renegades
23	Vivian Kingma	23 October 1994 (aged 21)	Right	Right-arm medium fast	Voorburg
17	Ahsan Malik	29 August 1989 (aged 26)	Right	Right-arm medium-fast	VOC Rotterdam
97	Stephan Myburgh	28 February 1984 (aged 32)	Left	Right-arm off-spin	Hermes DVS
4	Max O'Dowd	4 March 1994 (aged 22)	Right	Right-arm off-spin	North Holland Hurricanes
68	Michael Rippon	14 September 1991 (aged 24)	Right	Left-arm unorthodox spin
90	Logan van Beek	7 September 1990 (aged 25)	Right	Right-arm medium-fast	Canterbury
10	Timm van der Gugten	25 February 1991 (aged 25)	Right	Right-arm medium-fast	Hobart Hurricanes
52	Roelof van der Merwe	31 December 1984 (aged 31)	Right	Left-arm orthodox spin	Somerset
47	Paul van Meekeren	15 January 1993 (aged 23)	Right	Right-arm medium-fast	Rood & Wit Haarlem

== New Zealand ==
New Zealand announced their squad on 1 February 2016.

Coach: (New Zealand) Mike Hesson

No.	Player	Date of birth	Batting	Bowling style	Domestic team
22	Kane Williamson (c)	8 August 1990 (aged 25)	Right	Right-arm off-spin	Northern Knights
38	Tim Southee (vc)	11 December 1988 (aged 27)	Right	Right-arm fast-medium	Northern Knights
78	Corey Anderson	13 December 1990 (aged 25)	Left	Left-arm medium-fast	Northern Knights
18	Trent Boult	22 July 1989 (aged 26)	Right	Left-arm fast-medium	Northern Knights
88	Grant Elliott	21 March 1979 (aged 36)	Right	Right-arm medium	Wellington Firebirds
31	Martin Guptill	30 September 1986 (aged 29)	Right	Right-arm off-spin	Auckland Aces
81	Mitchell McClenaghan	11 June 1986 (aged 29)	Left	Left-arm medium-fast	Auckland Aces
15	Nathan McCullum	1 September 1980 (aged 35)	Right	Right-arm off-spin	Otago Volts
20	Adam Milne	13 April 1992 (aged 23)	Right	Right-arm fast	Central Stags
82	Colin Munro	11 March 1987 (aged 28)	Left	Right-arm medium-fast	Auckland Aces
86	Henry Nicholls (wk)	15 November 1991 (aged 24)	Left	Right-arm off-spin	Canterbury Kings
54	Luke Ronchi (wk)	23 April 1981 (aged 34)	Right	—	Wellington Firebirds
74	Mitchell Santner	5 February 1992 (aged 24)	Left	Left-arm orthodox	Northern Knights
61	Ish Sodhi	31 October 1992 (aged 23)	Right	Right-arm leg-spin	Northern Knights
3	Ross Taylor	8 March 1984 (aged 32)	Right	Right-arm off-spin	Central Stags

== Oman ==
Oman announced their squad on 13 February 2016:

Coach: (Sri Lanka) Duleep Mendis

No.	Player	Date of birth	Batting	Bowling style
7	Sultan Ahmed (c, wk)	18 June 1977 (aged 38)	Left	—
12	Zeeshan Maqsood (vc)	24 October 1987 (aged 28)	Left	Left-arm orthodox
13	Aamir Kaleem	20 November 1981 (aged 34)	Left	Left-arm orthodox
22	Amir Ali	24 November 1978 (aged 37)	Right	Right-arm off-spin
77	Ajay Lalcheta	22 October 1983 (aged 32)	Left	Left-arm orthodox
–	Arun Poulose	22 July 1986 (aged 29)	Right	Right-arm medium-fast
10	Jatinder Singh	5 March 1989 (aged 27)	Right	Right-arm off-spin
68	Khawar Ali	20 December 1985 (aged 30)	Right	Right-arm leg-spin
14	Mehran Khan	13 April 1987 (aged 28)	Right	—
–	Mohammad Nadeem	4 September 1982 (aged 33)	Right	Right-arm medium-fast
37	Munis Ansari	21 March 1979 (aged 36)	Right	Right-arm medium-fast
–	Rajeshkumar Ranpura	17 July 1983 (aged 32)	Left	Right-arm medium-fast
–	Sufyan Mehmood	21 October 1991 (aged 24)	Left	Right-arm medium-fast
–	Vaibhav Wategaonkar	30 August 1982 (aged 33)	Left	—
–	Yousuf Mahmood	28 March 1990 (aged 25)	Right	Right-arm fast-medium
–	Zeeshan Siddiqui	22 July 1979 (aged 36)	Right	Right-arm leg-spin
08	Bilal Khan	10 April 1988 (aged 27)	Left	Left-arm medium-fast
21	Adnan Ilyas	30 December 1984 (aged 31)	Right	Right-arm medium

== Pakistan ==
Pakistan announced their squad on 10 February 2016:

Coach: (Pakistan) Waqar Younis

No.	Player	Date of birth	Batting	Bowling style	Domestic team
10	Shahid Afridi (c)	1 March 1980 (aged 36)	Right	Right-arm leg-spin	Peshawar Zalmi
54	Sarfraz Ahmed (vc, wk)	22 May 1987 (aged 28)	Right	—	Quetta Gladiators
96	Umar Akmal (wk)	26 May 1990 (aged 25)	Right	—	Lahore Qalandars
48	Anwar Ali	25 November 1987 (aged 28)	Right	Right-arm medium-fast	Quetta Gladiators
5	Mohammad Amir	13 April 1992 (aged 23)	Left	Left-arm fast	Karachi Kings
8	Mohammad Hafeez	17 October 1980 (aged 35)	Right	Right-arm off-spin	Peshawar Zalmi
76	Mohammad Irfan	6 June 1982 (aged 33)	Right	Left-arm fast	Islamabad United
98	Sharjeel Khan	14 August 1989 (aged 26)	Left	Right-arm leg-spin	Islamabad United
18	Shoaib Malik	1 February 1982 (aged 34)	Right	Right-arm off-spin	Karachi Kings
19	Ahmed Shehzad	23 November 1991 (aged 24)	Right	Right-arm Leg-spin	Quetta Gladiators
51	Mohammad Nawaz	21 March 1994 (aged 21)	Left	Left-arm orthodox	Quetta Gladiators
47	Wahab Riaz	28 June 1985 (aged 30)	Right	Left-arm fast	Peshawar Zalmi
7	Mohammad Sami	24 February 1981 (aged 35)	Right	Right-arm fast	Islamabad United
9	Imad Wasim	18 December 1988 (aged 27)	Left	Left-arm orthodox	Karachi Kings
35	Khalid Latif	4 November 1985 (aged 30)	Right	Right-arm off-break	Islamabad United
Withdrawn players
56	Babar Azam	15 October 1994 (aged 21)	Right	Right-arm off-spin	Islamabad United
15	Rumman Raees	18 October 1991 (aged 24)	Right	Left-arm fast-medium	Islamabad United
95	Iftikhar Ahmed	3 October 1990 (aged 25)	Right	Right-arm off-spin	Karachi Kings
42	Khurram Manzoor	10 June 1986 (aged 29)	Right	Right-arm off-spin	Karachi Kings

== Scotland ==
Scotland announced their squad on 8 February 2016.

Coach: (New Zealand) Grant Bradburn

No.	Player	Date of birth	Batting	Bowling style	Domestic team
1	Preston Mommsen (c)	10 February 1987 (aged 29)	Right	Right-arm off break	Durham
15	Kyle Coetzer (vc)	4 February 1984 (aged 32)	Right	Right-arm medium-fast	Northamptonshire
44	Richie Berrington	4 March 1987 (aged 29)	Right	Right-arm medium-fast
13	Matthew Cross (wk)	15 October 1992 (aged 23)	Right		Nottinghamshire
38	Josh Davey	3 August 1990 (aged 25)	Right	Right-arm medium-fast	Somerset
5	Con de Lange	11 February 1981 (aged 35)	Right	Slow left-arm orthodox	Northamptonshire
45	Alasdair Evans	12 January 1989 (aged 27)	Right	Right-arm medium-fast	Derbyshire
29	Michael Leask	29 October 1990 (aged 25)	Right	Right-arm off break	Northamptonshire
14	Matt Machan	15 February 1991 (aged 25)	Left	Right-arm off break	Sussex
93	Calum MacLeod	15 November 1988 (aged 27)	Right	Right-arm medium-fast	Durham
28	Gavin Main	28 February 1995 (aged 21)	Right	Right-arm fast	Durham
93	George Munsey	21 February 1993 (aged 23)	Left	Right-arm medium-fast	Northamptonshire
50	Safyaan Sharif	24 May 1991 (aged 24)	Right	Right-arm fast-medium	Kent
42	Robert Taylor	21 December 1989 (aged 26)	Left	Left-arm medium	Leicestershire
51	Mark Watt	29 July 1996 (aged 19)	Left	Slow left-arm orthodox

== South Africa ==
South Africa announced their squad on 10 February 2016:

Coach: (South Africa) Russell Domingo

No.	Player	Date of birth	Batting	Bowling style	Domestic team
18	Faf du Plessis (c)	13 July 1984 (aged 31)	Right	Right-arm leg break	Titans
17	AB de Villiers (vc, wk)	17 February 1984 (aged 32)	Right	Right-arm medium	Titans
87	Kyle Abbott	18 June 1987 (aged 28)	Right	Right-arm fast medium	Dolphins
1	Hashim Amla	31 March 1983 (aged 32)	Right	Right-arm medium	Cape Cobras
28	Farhaan Behardien	9 October 1983 (aged 32)	Right	Right-arm medium	Titans
12	Quinton de Kock (wk)	17 December 1992 (aged 23)	Left		Titans
21	JP Duminy	14 April 1984 (aged 31)	Left	Right-arm off break	Cape Cobras
99	Imran Tahir	28 March 1979 (aged 36)	Right	Right-arm leg break	Dolphins
10	David Miller	10 June 1989 (aged 26)	Left	Right-arm off break	Dolphins
2	Chris Morris	30 April 1987 (aged 28)	Right	Right-arm medium	Titans
69	Aaron Phangiso	21 January 1984 (aged 32)	Right	Left-arm orthodox spin	Highveld Lions
25	Kagiso Rabada	25 May 1995 (aged 20)	Left	Right-arm fast	Highveld Lions
27	Rilee Rossouw	9 October 1989 (aged 26)	Left	Right-arm off break	Knights
8	Dale Steyn	23 June 1983 (aged 32)	Right	Right-arm fast	Cape Cobras
96	David Wiese	20 May 1985 (aged 30)	Right	Right-arm medium-fast	Titans

== Sri Lanka ==
Sri Lanka announced their squad on 18 February 2016:

Coach: (South Africa) Graham Ford

No.	Player	Date of birth	Batting	Bowling style	Domestic team
61	Angelo Mathews (c)	2 June 1987 (aged 28)	Right	Right-arm fast medium	CCC
36	Dinesh Chandimal (vc, wk)	18 November 1989 (aged 26)	Right	Right-arm off spin	Nondescripts
5	Dushmantha Chameera	11 January 1992 (aged 24)	Right	Right-arm fast	Nondescripts
23	Tillakaratne Dilshan	14 October 1976 (aged 39)	Right	Right-arm off spin	Tamil Union
14	Rangana Herath	19 March 1978 (aged 37)	Left	Left-arm orthodox spin	Tamil Union
31	Shehan Jayasuriya	12 September 1991 (aged 24)	Left	Right-arm off spin	Moors
16	Chamara Kapugedera	24 February 1987 (aged 29)	Right	Right-arm medium	CCC
92	Nuwan Kulasekara	22 July 1982 (aged 33)	Right	Right-arm fast medium	Colts
82	Suranga Lakmal	10 March 1987 (aged 28)	Right	Right-arm fast medium	Tamil Union
1	Thisara Perera	3 April 1989 (aged 26)	Left	Right-arm medium fast	SSC
18	Sachithra Senanayake	9 February 1985 (aged 31)	Right	Right-arm off spin	SSC
7	Dasun Shanaka	9 September 1991 (aged 24)	Right	Right-arm medium	SSC
57	Milinda Siriwardana	4 December 1985 (aged 30)	Left	Left-arm orthodox spin	Chilaw Marians
66	Lahiru Thirimanne	9 August 1989 (aged 26)	Left	Right-arm medium	Ragama
46	Jeffrey Vandersay	5 February 1990 (aged 26)	Right	Right-arm leg break	SSC
Withdrawn players
	Niroshan Dickwella (wk)	23 June 1993 (aged 22)	Left		Nondescripts
99	Lasith Malinga	28 August 1983 (aged 32)	Right	Right-arm fast	Nondescripts

== West Indies ==
The West Indian squad was announced on 29 January 2016.

Coach: (Trinidad and Tobago) Phil Simmons

No.	Player	Date of birth	Batting	Bowling style	Domestic team
88	Darren Sammy (c)	20 December 1983 (aged 32)	Right	Right-arm medium-fast	St Lucia Zouks
98	Jason Holder (vc)	5 November 1991 (aged 24)	Right	Right-arm medium-fast	Barbados Tridents
45	Chris Gayle	21 September 1979 (aged 36)	Left	Right-arm off-spin	Jamaica Tallawahs
77	Samuel Badree	9 March 1981 (aged 34)	Right	Right-arm leg-spin	Trinbago Knight Riders
62	Sulieman Benn	22 July 1981 (aged 34)	Left	Left-arm orthodox	Trinbago Knight Riders
26	Carlos Brathwaite	18 July 1988 (aged 27)	Right	Right-arm medium-fast	St Kitts and Nevis Patriots
47	Dwayne Bravo	7 October 1983 (aged 32)	Right	Right-arm medium-fast	Trinbago Knight Riders
25	Johnson Charles (wk)	14 January 1989 (aged 27)	Right	—	St Lucia Zouks
17	Evin Lewis	27 December 1991 (aged 24)	Left		St Kitts and Nevis Patriots
5	Ashley Nurse	22 December 1988 (aged 27)	Right	Right-arm off-spin	Barbados Tridents
80	Denesh Ramdin (wk)	13 March 1985 (aged 30)	Right	—	Guyana Amazon Warriors
12	Andre Russell	29 April 1988 (aged 27)	Right	Right-arm fast	Jamaica Tallawahs
7	Marlon Samuels	5 February 1981 (aged 35)	Right	Right-arm off-spin	St Kitts and Nevis Patriots
54	Lendl Simmons (wk)	25 January 1985 (aged 31)	Right	Right-arm medium-fast	Guyana Amazon Warriors
75	Jerome Taylor	22 June 1984 (aged 31)	Right	Right-arm fast	Jamaica Tallawahs
Withdrawn players
46	Darren Bravo	6 February 1989 (aged 27)	Left	Right-arm medium-fast	Trinbago Knight Riders
72	Andre Fletcher (wk)	28 November 1987 (aged 28)	Right	Right-arm leg-spin	St Lucia Zouks
74	Sunil Narine	26 May 1988 (aged 27)	Left	Right-arm off-spin	Guyana Amazon Warriors
55	Kieron Pollard	12 May 1987 (aged 28)	Right	Right-arm medium-fast	Barbados Tridents

== Zimbabwe ==
Zimbabwe announced their squad on 14 February 2016:

Coach: (Australia) Dav Whatmore

No.	Player	Date of birth	Batting	Bowling style	Domestic team
3	Hamilton Masakadza (c)	9 August 1983 (aged 32)	Right	Right-arm medium	Mountaineers
14	Sean Williams (vc)	26 September 1986 (aged 29)	Left	Left-arm orthodox	Mid West Rhinos
13	Tendai Chatara	28 February 1991 (aged 25)	Right	Right-arm fast-medium	Mountaineers
47	Elton Chigumbura	14 March 1986 (aged 29)	Right	Right-arm fast-medium	Mashonaland Eagles
88	Tendai Chisoro	12 February 1988 (aged 28)	Left	Left-arm orthodox	Mid West Rhinos
30	Graeme Cremer	19 September 1986 (aged 29)	Right	Right-arm leg-spin	Mid West Rhinos
12	Luke Jongwe	6 February 1995 (aged 21)	Right	Right-arm fast-medium	Matabeleland Tuskers
7	Neville Madziva	2 August 1991 (aged 24)	Right	Right-arm medium-fast	Mid West Rhinos
11	Wellington Masakadza	4 October 1993 (aged 22)	Left	Left-arm orthodox	Mountaineers
24	Peter Moor (wk)	2 February 1991 (aged 25)	Right	Right-arm off-spin	Mid West Rhinos
89	Richmond Mutumbami (wk)	11 June 1989 (aged 26)	Right	—	Matabeleland Tuskers
48	Tinashe Panyangara	21 October 1985 (aged 30)	Right	Right-arm fast-medium	Mid West Rhinos
24	Sikandar Raza	24 April 1986 (aged 29)	Right	Right-arm off-spin	Mashonaland Eagles
10	Vusi Sibanda	10 October 1983 (aged 32)	Right	Right-arm medium	Mountaineers
9	Malcolm Waller	28 September 1984 (aged 31)	Right	Right-arm off-spin	Mid West Rhinos
33	Chamu Chibhabha	6 September 1986 (aged 29)	Right	Right-arm medium	Mashonaland Eagles
25	Donald Tiripano	17 March 1988 (aged 27)	Right	Right-arm fast-medium	Mountaineers

== Changes ==
On 19 March, Taskin Ahmed and Arafat Sunny, members of the Bangladesh squad, were suspended from bowling in international cricket due to probable illegal bowling actions. They were replaced with Shuvagata Hom and Saqlain Sajib.

On 26 February, England's Liam Plunkett was named as the replacement for Steven Finn, who was ruled out with a calf strain.

Tom Cooper was added to the Netherlands squad on 25 February, 19 days after the squad was announced.

On 23 February, Babar Azam and Rumman Raees withdrew from the tournament due to injury. They were replaced in the Pakistan squad by Sharjeel Khan and Mohammad Sami. Khalid Latif was also added to Pakistan's squad in place of Iftikhar Ahmed. On 3 March, Ahmed Shehzad was also added to the squad in place of Khurram Manzoor.

Sri Lanka's squad was changed after the initial announcement. This new squad was named on 8 March 2016, where Jeffrey Vandersay and Niroshan Dickwella were replaced by Suranga Lakmal and Lahiru Thirimanne. Lasith Malinga stepped down from the captaincy due to his slow recovery from an injury and Angelo Mathews was appointed as the captain. On 18 March Sri Lanka Cricket announced that Malinga was ruled out of the tournament after failing to sufficiently recover from his knee injury. Jeffrey Vandersay, who was withdrawn earlier from the original squad, was named as Malinga's replacement.

After the West Indies squad was announced, Kieron Pollard, Sunil Narine and Darren Bravo withdrew before the tournament started. Pollard was replaced by Carlos Brathwaite, while Ashley Nurse replaced Narine. Bravo's replacement in the squad is Johnson Charles. Lendl Simmons was ruled out of the tournament after suffering a back injury. He was replaced with Evin Lewis. Before the semi-finals, Andre Fletcher suffered a hamstring injury and was ruled out of the rest of the tournament. Lendl Simmons, who had recovered from his back injury was called in as a replacement.

Yuvraj Singh was ruled out before semi final. Manish Pandey was called to replaced him.
