= Coleraine Cricket Club =

Cricket club in Coleraine, Northern Ireland

Coleraine
Team information
- Founded: 1958
- Home ground: Rugby Avenue

Coleraine Cricket Club is a cricket club in Coleraine, County Londonderry, Northern Ireland, playing in North West Senior League Premiership. They are affiliated with the North West Cricket Union and Cricket Ireland. The club was founded as the cricket section of Coleraine Rugby Football Club in 1958 and later merged with the University of Ulster at Coleraine team.

== History ==
Coleraine Cricket Club was formed originally as the cricket arm of Coleraine Rugby Football Club in 1921 following the Coleraine Academical Institution's success in the Ulster Schools Cup. The cricket section was dissolved for a period of time before being reformed in 1958 again as a part of the rugby club. In 1986, Coleraine defeated Strabane Cricket Club to win the North West Senior Cup in their first cup final appearance. A year later, they hosted an international first-class match between the Ireland national cricket team and the Scotland national cricket team.

In 2013, Coleraine became champions of the North West Senior League One. In 2015, Coleraine became champions of the North West Cricket Union Premiership by default, after Brigade Cricket Club declined to play the championship playoff match being held at Eglinton Cricket Club, Londonderry, on the grounds that their players would be on holiday. In 2016, they signed former Sri Lanka national cricket team player Suraj Randiv for the rest of their season. This also made him eligible to play for the North West Warriors provincial team. In 2019, Coleraine managed to avoid relegation from the Premier Division.

== Honours ==
- North West Senior League: 2
  - 2013, 2015
- Ulster Cup: 1
  - 2013
- North West Senior Cup: 1
  - 1986
