= Roy Harrison (cricketer) =

Irish cricketer

Personal information
- Born: 30 August 1939 (age 87); Lurgan, Northern Ireland
- Batting: Right-handed
- Bowling: Right-arm medium
- Relatives: Garfield Harrison (brother); Deryck Harrison (brother); Jim Harrison (brother); Jonathan Bushe (nephew); Eddie Bushe (brother-in-law)

Domestic team information
- Years: Team
- 1968: Ireland

Career statistics
Competition	First-class
Matches	1
Runs scored	16
Batting average	8.00
100s/50s	0/0
Top score	12
Catches/stumpings	2/–
- Source: Cricinfo, 30 December 2021

Roy Harrison MBE (born 30 August 1939) is an Irish former cricketer. A right-handed batsman and right-arm medium pace bowler, he played three times for the Ireland cricket team between 1967 and 1968 including one first-class match.

== Playing career ==
Harrison made his debut for Ireland against Worcestershire in Dublin in June 1967. It was very much an inauspicious debut, as he was dismissed for a duck in both innings. He returned to the Irish side in August the following year, scoring 43 against the Combined Services, his highest score for Ireland. He then played his final match for Ireland against Scotland, which was his only first-class match.

== Statistics ==
In his three matches for Ireland, he scored 59 runs at an average of 11.80.

== Post-playing career ==
Harrison has served as president of the Irish Cricket Union since 2006.

He was appointed Member of the Order of the British Empire (MBE) in the 2016 New Year Honours for voluntary service to cricket in Northern Ireland.

== Family ==
Harrison came from a cricketing family. Three of his brothers, Deryck, Garfield and Jim, all played for Ireland, as did his brother-in-law Eddie Bushe and his nephew Jonathan Bushe.
