= McBrine =

McBrine is a surname. Notable people with the surname include:

- Andy McBrine (born 1993), Irish cricketer
- James McBrine (born 1963), Irish cricketer
- Junior McBrine (born 1963), Irish cricketer

== See also ==
- McBride (surname)
- McBrien
