= Fox Lodge Cricket Club =

Coordinates: 54°51′43.01″N 7°25′37.86″W

Fox Lodge
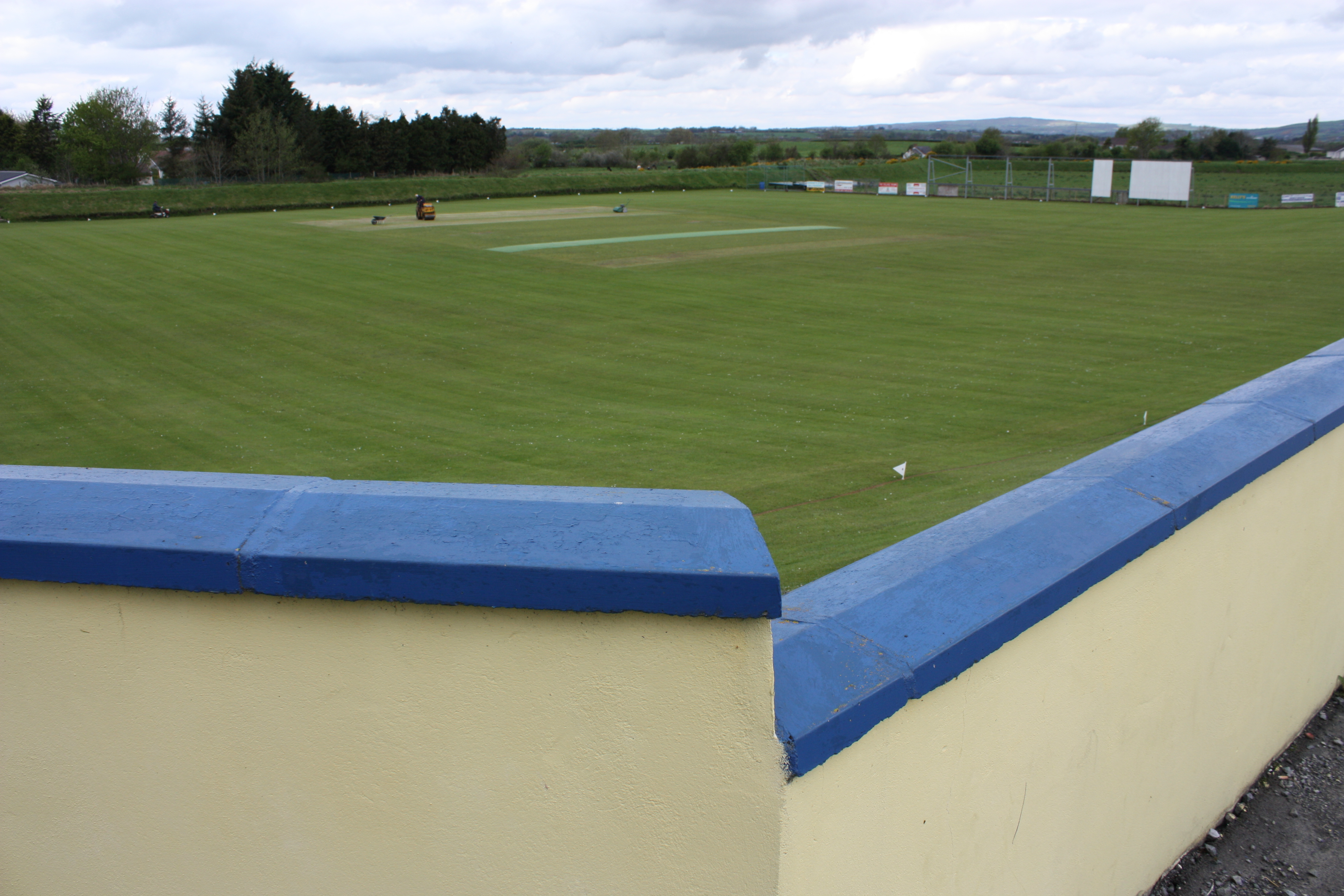
- The club's grounds in Ballymagorry

Personnel
- Captain: Aaron Heywood (as of 2022)

Team information
- City: Strabane
- Colors: Yellow and navy
- Home ground: Victoria Road, Ballymagorry

Fox Lodge Cricket Club is a cricket club in Ballymagorry, County Tyrone, Northern Ireland, playing in the North West Premiership. The club won the North West Senior Cup (in men's and women's competition) in 2022.

== Grounds ==
The club's grounds are located in Ballymagorry, County Tyrone. In 1934, the ground hosted a non first-class match between the Irish cricket team and a touring side from Marylebone Cricket Club in London. In 2002, the ground was due to host a Women's One Day International when Ireland women played India women, – however no play was possible because of rain.

== Honours ==
- North West Senior Cup (1): 2022

== See also ==
- Strabane Cricket Club
