= List of Ireland Test wicket-keepers =

A Test match is an international cricket match between two representative teams that are full members of the ICC. Both teams have two innings, and the match lasts up to five days. Wicket-keepers plays an important role in test cricket and, over time, the role has evolved into a specialist position.

Ireland were granted full membership and therefore Test status at the International Cricket Council's annual conference held on 22 June 2017, after having been one of the leading associate members for many years. Ireland played their first Test match in May 2018 against Pakistan at the Malahide Cricket Club Ground in Dublin. This is a chronological list of Irish wicket-keepers, that is, Test cricketers who have kept wicket in a match for Ireland.

This list only includes players who have played as the designated keeper for a match. On occasions, another player may have stepped in to relieve the primary wicket-keeper due to injury or the keeper bowling. Figures do not include catches made when the player was a non wicket-keeper.

No.	Player	Span	Tests	Catches	Stumpings	Total dismissals	Ref
1	Niall O'Brien	2018	1	2	0	2	
2	Stuart Poynter	2019	1	2	1	3	
3	Gary Wilson	2019	1	6	0	6	

== See also ==
- List of Irish Test cricketers
