= Ardmore Cricket Club =

Ardmore
Personnel
- Captain: Rachit Gaur

Team information
- Colors: Blue/Sky Blue
- Founded: 1879
- Home ground: The Bleach Green

History
- North West Senior Cup wins: 1
- North West Senior 2 League wins: 2

Ardmore Cricket Club is a cricket club in Ardmore, County Londonderry, Northern Ireland, playing in the Premier League of the North West Senior League.

== Playing record ==
The club has suffered relegation twice since the turn of the century in 2006 and 2008. A lone bright spot was reaching the final of the Ulster Cup only to lose to Strabane in a rain shortened match.

The club has a dubious history in the North West Senior Cup reaching the final on ten occasions. Their only victory came in 1994 helped by the performance of former Indian Test player Sanjeev Sharma, breaking a losing streak of eight finals. They also hold the record for the lowest score ever recorded in a final when they were bowled out for only 17 runs in the second innings in 1998.

== Honours ==
- North West Senior League: 1
  - 2023
- North West Senior Cup: 1
  - 1994
