= Ulster Cup (cricket) =

The Ulster Cup was a knock-out cricket competition in Ireland run jointly by the Northern Cricket Union and the North West Cricket Union. The top eight teams in the previous season's NCU Premier League and North West Senior League 1 were eligible to take part.

Matches are of 40 overs duration, but may be reduced to ten overs where delays or interruptions necessitate.

Waringstown are the current holders after they won the trophy for the first time beating Bready in the 2017 final

Brigade and Instonians are the most successful clubs in the competition with 4 wins each

The competition was discontinued after the 2017 season, and from 2021 the Ulster Cup will be played for between the winners of the NCU and NWCU T20 Cup competitions.

== List of finals ==
Season	Winners	Runners-Up	Scores	Notes
1999	Instonians			
2000	Lisburn	Donemana		
2001	Brigade	Donemana		
2002	North Down	Downpatrick		
2003	Brigade	Limavady		
2004	Donemana	Limavady		
2005	Strabane	Ardmore	(10 overs per side); Strabane 124–4 (P Gillespie 66); Ardmore 102–9 (M Gillespie 4–12). Strabane won by 22 runs.	
2006	North Down	Limavady		
2007	Instonians	North Down	North Down 206–5 (Taimur Khan 93); Instonians 210–2 (37 overs, R West 84 not out, A White 70 not out). Instonians won by 8 wickets.	
2008	Limavady	Strabane	Limavady 170–8; Strabane 166–8 (J A Beukes 71). Limavady won by 4 runs.	
2009	Civil Service North	North Down		
2010	Instonians	Limavady	Limavady 160 all out (39.5 overs, S Shannon 4–43); Instonians 161–6 (33.5 overs A White 47 not out). Instonians won by 4 wickets.	
2011	Instonians	North Down	Limavady 121 all out (36.4 overs, B Wylie 3–25); Instonians 127–6 (29.3 overs, R McCann 45 not out, I Moran 3–34). Instonians won by 4 wickets.	
2012	Brigade	Civil Service North of Ireland	Brigade won by 43 runs.	
2013	Coleraine	Waringstown	Coleraine won by 35 runs.	
2014	Bready	Waringstown	Bready 185–9 (D Barr 41, B Crumley 30, D Moore 20, M Olphert 24, J Hall 3–25, J Mitchell 2–22, J McCollum 3–28) Waringstown 91 (C Young 3–24, E Kemm 3–26, R Barr 3–23); Bready won by 94 runs.	
2015	North Down	Instonians	North Down 233–6 (A Sutherland 38, D Graham 43, P Malan 98no, A Shields 20, A White 2–37) Instonians 120–4 (23.5 overs) (N Russell 47, N Smith 36, J Mulder 2–14, M Moreland 2–28); North Down won by 10 runs (DLS) (DLS par score was 130 from 23.5 overs).	
2016	Brigade	Ardmore	Brigade 163 (R Hunter 95, I Hussain 28, Dunn 2–32, Curry 2–25) Ardmore 14–1 (5.1 overs) (abandoned); Brigade won 3–2 in a bowl-out.	
2017	Waringstown	Bready	Waringstown 158–7 (J Hall 31, G Thompson 32, M McClean 25, R Kelly 2–30, A Lucas 2–33); Bready 79 (G Kidd 3–16, L Nelson 2–11, K McCallan 2–14) Waringstown beat Bready by 79 runs.	

== Summary of winners ==
Team	Wins
Brigade	4
Instonians	4
North Down	3
Bready	1
Donemana	1
Limavady	1
Lisburn	1
Civil Service North of Ireland	1
Coleraine	1
Strabane	1
Waringstown	1

=== Summary of winners by province ===
Team	Wins
Northern	10
North Western	9

== See also ==
- Irish Senior Cup
- NCU Senior League
- North West Senior League
