= Deryck Harrison =

Irish former cricketer (born 1943)

Cricket information
- Batting: Right-handed

International information
- National side: Ireland

Career statistics
Competition	First-class	List A
Matches	2	1
Runs scored	0	11
Batting average	0.00	11.00
100s/50s	0/0	0/0
Top score	6	11
Catches/stumpings	2/–	0/–
- Source: CricketArchive, 16 November 2022

Deryck William Harrison (3 November 1943 – 20 May 2024) was an Irish cricketer. A right-handed batsman, he played eleven times for the Ireland cricket team between 1978 and 1980, including two first-class matches and one List A match.

== Playing career ==
Harrison made his debut for Ireland against Denmark in July 1978 and made his first-class debut against Scotland the following month. His next match was against FW Millett's XI in July 1979, scoring 74 not out in the Irish first innings, his highest score for Ireland.

He continued that year with matches against the MCC, Wales and Worcestershire in addition to a second, and final, first-class match against Scotland. His international career then came to an end in 1980, playing against the MCC, twice against the West Indies before his final game against Middlesex at Lord's, a Gillette Cup match that was his only List A appearance.

In relation to the Irish Premier League, Deryck continued to play for Waringstown Cricket Club up until the 1993 season ended.

== Statistics ==
In all matches for Ireland, Harrison scored 265 runs at an average of 24.09. He scored two half-centuries.

== Family ==
Harrison came from a cricketing family. His brothers Garfield, Jim and Roy all represented Ireland at cricket, as did his brother-in-law Eddie Bushe and his nephew Jonathan Bushe.
