= Jim Harrison (cricketer) =

Irish former cricketer (born 1941)

Cricket information
- Batting: Right-handed

International information
- National side: Ireland

Career statistics
Competition	First-class
Matches	8
Runs scored	309
Batting average	22.07
100s/50s	1/1
Top score	100*
Catches/stumpings	3/–
- Source: CricketArchive, 16 November 2022

James Harrison (born 3 May 1941) is an Irish former cricketer. A right-handed batsman, he played 32 times for the Ireland cricket team between 1969 and 1977, including eight first-class matches against Scotland.

== Playing career ==
Harrison made his debut for Ireland against Scotland in June 1969 in a first-class match. He followed this with two games against the West Indies, the first of which was the famous win for Ireland at Sion Mills. He played once more that year, against Wilfred Isaac's XI.

In 1970, he played five matches for Ireland, against the Combined Services, Denmark, the MCC, the Netherlands and Scotland. Four more matches followed in 1971, against Denmark, the MCC, Scotland and Wales, he played just once in 1972, against Wales.

He started 1973 with an innings of 111 not out against Wales in Dublin, his highest score for Ireland, and followed this with matches against Denmark, the MCC and Scotland, before visiting North America with the Irish side, playing against Canada and the USA.

He remained in the Irish side over the next four years, playing against Australia, the MCC, the Netherlands, Scotland, Wales and the West Indies, before scoring his only first-class century against Scotland in his final first-class match, just prior to his final match for Ireland against the MCC at Lord's.

== Statistics ==
In all matches for Ireland, he scored 1347 runs at an average of 25.42. He scored four half-centuries and two centuries.

== Family ==
Harrison came from a cricketing family. Three of his brothers, Deryck, Garfield and Roy all represented Ireland, as did his brother-in-law Eddie Bushe and his nephew Jonathan Bushe.
