= Sion Mills Cricket Club =

Sports organisation in County Tyrone, Northern Ireland

Sion Mills
Personnel
- Captain: Simon Galloway

Team information
- Colors: Navy & Blue
- Founded: 1864
- Home ground: Holm Field

Sion Mills Cricket Club is a cricket club in Sion Mills, County Tyrone, Northern Ireland, playing in Qualifying League 1 of the North West League, having dropped out of the North West Senior League before the 2015 season.

The club was founded in 1864, under the patronage of the Herdman family, the local mill owners. It has won the North West Senior League on 28 occasions and the Cup 29 times. The club is remembered internationally as the host of the famous victory by Ireland against the West Indies in 1969.

In 1947, Sion Mills entered the NCU Challenge Cup and won it at the first attempt, also doing the North West "double" of league and cup in the same season. Sion reached eleven North West cup finals between 1945 and 1962, and lost only one, also winning six league titles during the same period. During the 1940s, it was arguably the strongest club in Ireland.

In September 2019, the future of the club was put in doubt, following an arson attack.

== 150th anniversary ==
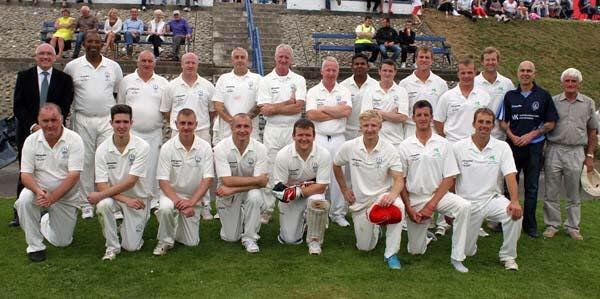
Ireland Select and Sion Select, 2016

The club celebrated its 150th anniversary by hosting a select match at the Holm Field in 2014. Sion Mills Select consisting of past names through the years and some current squad members as well as some North West stalwarts like Junior McBrine and James McBrine. Played an Ireland Select (selected by then Cricket Ireland President Joe Doherty) led by Cricket Ireland international John Mooney and backed by another Ireland International in Stuart Thompson.

Some big names from around the North West and Ireland Cricket were selected. Then Ireland head coach Phil Simmons put on a display for the Ireland Select backed up by an innings of 70 for Thompson. The Ireland Select scored 279 which they declared. Roy Silva taking 3 wickets.

Sion Select fought hard through the match and their innings was dominated by Sri Lankan North West dynamo Roy Silva. Who scored a 116 consisting of 12 sixes and 8 fours entertaining the crowd. Sion recorded a win in the last over of the game.

== Honours ==
- North West Senior League: 26 (1 shared)
  - 1904, 1907, 1909, 1911, 1913, 1919, 1920, 1923, 1925, 1926, 1927, 1928, 1929 (shared), 1933, 1938, 1940, 1947, 1953, 1954, 1955, 1957, 1958, 1962, 1964, 1975, 1978
- County Londonderry/North West Senior Cup: 29
  - 1889, 1890, 1892, 1894, 1896, 1904, 1905, 1913, 1914, 1926, 1931, 1934, 1935, 1940, 1945, 1947, 1949, 1951, 1952, 1955, 1957, 1960, 1961, 1962, 1970, 1971, 1979, 1983, 1984
- NCU Challenge Cup: 2 (1 shared)
  - 1947, 1958 (shared)
