= Irish Senior Cup =

Irish Senior Cup may refer to

- Irish Senior Cup (cricket) - knockout competition for senior men's cricket clubs in Ireland
- Irish Senior Cup (Men's Hockey) - knockout competition for senior men's hockey clubs in Ireland
- Irish Senior Cup (Ladies' Hockey) - knockout competition for senior ladies' hockey clubs in Ireland
