= NWSC =

NWSC may refer to:

- National Water and Sewerage Corporation, a water supply and sanitation company in Uganda.
- Neighbourhood and Worker's Service Centre, a pro-democracy political group in Hong Kong
- National Water Sports Centre, Holme Pierrepont, Nottingham, England
- North West Senior Cup (cricket), cricket competition in Ireland
- North West Senior Cup (football), football cup competition in Northern Ireland
