= Garfield Harrison =

Irish cricketer

Cricket information
- Batting: Left-handed
- Bowling: Right-arm off spin

International information
- National side: Ireland

Career statistics
Competition	First-class	List A
Matches	12	20
Runs scored	670	182
Batting average	41.87	9.57
100s/50s	1/3	0/0
Top score	105*	23
Balls bowled	1,562	841
Wickets	23	13
Bowling average	30.56	42.38
5 wickets in innings	2	0
10 wickets in match	0	0
Best bowling	9/113	3/42
Catches/stumpings	3/–	3/–
- Source: CricketArchive, 9 October 2022

Garfield David Harrison (born 1961) is one of four brothers to have played cricket for the Ireland cricket team. Garfield was by far the most successful of the four, playing 118 times for Ireland between 1983 and 1997, including twelve first-class matches against Scotland and 20 List A matches.

He is one of only six players to have played more than 100 times for Ireland, behind only Kyle McCallan and Alan Lewis. He started his career as an opening bowler, but switched to off spin, becoming so good at this style of bowling that he took 9/113 against Scotland in 1990, the best bowling figures in first-class cricket in the UK that year, the fourth best bowling figures in all cricket for Ireland and the second best for Ireland in first-class cricket.

== Playing career ==
=== 1980s ===
born 8 May 1961 in Lurgan, County Armagh, Northern Ireland Harrison first played for Ireland in June 1983, playing two games against Worcestershire, closely followed by his List A debut against Sussex in the NatWest Trophy in June 1983 and his first-class debut in July against Scotland. He had a successful first-class debut, scoring 86 in the Irish first innings. He also played against Gloucestershire, the MCC and Wales during his first year in the Irish team.

He retained his place in the Ireland team in 1984, playing against the MCC, Scotland, Surrey and the West Indies, though he played just once in 1985 against Scotland. He went on Ireland's tour of Zimbabwe in early 1986, playing two matches, but again played just once during the summer, again against Scotland.

He became a much more regular fixture in the Irish side in 1987, playing ten times that year, five times in 1988 and nine times in 1989, including internationals against Pakistan, Scotland and Wales.

=== 1990s ===
The first year of the decade saw his finest hour in the Irish side. After playing two matches against New Zealand and Worcestershire and a match each against the MCC, Sussex and Wales he played a first-class match against Scotland in Edinburgh. The match was drawn, but Harrison took 9/113 in the only Scottish innings, the best bowling figures in UK first-class cricket that year.

1991 saw him tour Zimbabwe once again, with games against Middlesex, Scotland and the West Indies during the summer. 1992 saw games against the MCC, Middlesex and an England Amateur XI.

1993 was an important year for Irish cricket as they gained membership of the International Cricket Council and Harrison continued to retain his place in the Irish side. That year he played against Australia, Barbados, the Netherlands and Scotland in addition to playing in that year's Triple Crown Tournament. In early 1994, he was named in Ireland's squad for the 1994 ICC Trophy, Ireland's first appearance in the tournament. The summer saw him scored his first and only century for Ireland against Scotland, in addition to playing against Leicestershire, New Zealand, Northamptonshire and in the 1994 Triple Crown Tournament.

Ireland began to play much more in 1995 and 1996, and Harrison played 24 times for them in those two years, including internationals against Scotland and the West Indies, several games against English county sides and the Triple Crown Tournament in 1995 and 1996, and the European Championship in 1996. before playing his final first-class game against Scotland in August 1996. His Ireland career finished in 1997, playing in the ICC Trophy that year, his last match coming against Scotland on 10 April.

=== Post Ireland ===
In 2003, he came out of retirement to play a match for the MCC against Ireland at Lord's in August, scoring 29 and taking 1/37.

== Statistics ==
In all matches for Ireland, he scored 2765 runs at an average of 26.08, scoring twelve half-centuries and one century. He took 140 wickets at an average of 33.67, taking five wickets in an innings three times.

== Family ==
Harrison came from a cricketing family. Three of his brothers (Derryck, Jim and Roy) all played for Ireland, as did his brother-in-law Eddie Bushe and his nephew Jonathan Bushe.
