= Eddie Bushe =

Irish cricketer (born 1951)

Personal information
- Full name: Edwin Alexander Bushe
- Born: 11 April 1951 (age 75); Lurgan, Northern Ireland
- Batting: Right-handed
- Role: Wicket-keeper
- Relatives: Garfield Harrison (brother-in-law); Deryck Harrison (brother-in-law); Jim Harrison (brother-in-law); Jonathan Bushe (son)

Domestic team information
- Years: Team
- 1979–1980: Ireland

Career statistics
Competition	First-class
Matches	2
Runs scored	14
Batting average	14.00
100s/50s	0/0
Top score	14
Catches/stumpings	7/1
- Source: Cricinfo, 30 December 2021

Edwin Alexander Bushe (born 11 April 1951) is a former Irish cricketer. A right-handed batsman and wicket-keeper, he made his debut for Ireland in July 1979 against Scotland. He went on to play for Ireland on six occasions, his last match also against Scotland in August 1980. Two of his matches had first-class status.
