= Richard McDaid =

Irish cricketer

Personal information
- Full name: Richard William McDaid
- Born: 3 November 1975 (age 51); Derry, Northern Ireland
- Batting: Right-handed
- Bowling: Right-arm medium

International information
- National side: Ireland

Career statistics
Competition	First-class
Matches	2
Runs scored	6
Batting average	–
100s/50s	–/–
Top score	6*
Balls bowled	252
Wickets	2
Bowling average	76.50
5 wickets in innings	–
10 wickets in match	–
Best bowling	1/34
Catches/stumpings	2/–
- Source: Cricinfo, 15 July 2010

Richard William McDaid (born 3 November 1975) is an Irish cricketer. McDaid is a right-handed batsman who bowls right-arm medium pace.

McDaid played two first-class matches for the Ireland cricket team in 1999, both coming against the South Africa Academy. McDaid took 2 wickets at a bowling average of 76.50, with best figures of 1/34. He represented Ireland in 16 other matches from 1999 to 2002.

McDaid continues to play club cricket for Limavady Cricket and Rugby Club, Northern Ireland.
