= Deryck Vincent =

Irish cricketer (born 1964)

Personal information
- Full name: Deryck Andrew Vincent
- Born: 16 September 1964 (age 62); Dublin, Leinster
- Batting: Left-handed
- Role: Wicket-keeper batsman
- Relatives: Stuart Poynter (nephew); Andrew Poynter (nephew)

Domestic team information
- Years: Team
- 1970-2016: Clontarf Cricket Club
- Source: ESPNcricinfo, 1 May 2016

Deryck Andrew Vincent (born 16 September 1964) is an Irish first-class cricketer who plays for Clontarf Cricket Club.

Vincent's nephews Stuart Poynter and Andrew Poynter also represented Ireland cricket team and his son, David seems to be following his footsteps.
