= Glendermott Cricket Club =

Glendermott
Team information
- Founded: 1926
- Home ground: Rectory Field

Glendermott Cricket Club is a cricket club in Derry, Northern Ireland, playing in the North West Championship.

== Honours ==
- North West Senior Cup: 1
  - 2005
