= North West Senior League =

The North West Senior League is the provincial cricket league within the North West Cricket Union jurisdiction in Ireland, which covers counties Londonderry, Fermanagh, and part of Tyrone in Northern Ireland and County Donegal in the Republic of Ireland. The league has fifteen members. The season begins with the teams divided into two groups, and after playing each other once the top four teams from each group play off as the Premier League to determine the champions, while the remaining seven clubs play a separate competition. It is sponsored by Long's Supervalu. Teams play each other twice per season, once at home and once away, each season, with two points awarded for a win and one for a tie or for “no result”.

The league began as the County Derry League from 1894 until 1897, when it stopped after only five teams entered. It resumed again in 1904.

Sectarian attacks forced the City of Derry club to withdraw from the North West League at the start of the Troubles.

== Members for 2021 season ==
Location of teams in the North West Senior League

- Ardmore
- Ballyspallen
- Bonds Glen
- Bready
- Brigade
- Burndennett
- Coleraine
- Donemana
- Eglinton
- Fox Lodge
- Glendermott
- Killyclooney
- Newbuildings
- St Johnston
- Strabane

== List of champions ==
Season	Champions
1894	unknown
1895	Ballymoney
1896	unknown
1897	Ballymoney
1898-1903	no competition
1904	Sion Mills
1905	Waterside
1906	Waterside
1907	Sion Mills
1908	Clooney
1909	Sion Mills
1910	Strabane
1911	Sion Mills
1912	Strabane
1913	Sion Mills
1914	Clooney
1915-18	no competition
1919	Sion Mills
1920	Sion Mills
1921	City of Derry
1922	City of Derry
1923	Sion Mills
1924	City of Derry
1925	Sion Mills
1926	Sion Mills
1927	Sion Mills
1928	Sion Mills
1929	Sion Mills
1930	Brigade and Sion Mills (shared)
1931	Strabane
1932	Strabane
1933	Sion Mills
1934	Strabane
1935	Strabane
1936	Brigade
1937	Brigade
1938	Sion Mills
1939	Strabane
1940	Sion Mills
1941	Strabane
1942	no competition
1943	Strabane
1944	Brigade
1945	Brigade
1946	City of Derry
1947	Sion Mills
1948	Donemana
1949	Donemana
1950	Donemana
1951	Donemana
1952	Donemana
1953	Sion Mills
1954	Sion Mills
1955	Sion Mills
1956	Eglinton
1957	Sion Mills
1958	Sion Mills
1959	Strabane
1960	Donemana
1961	Limavady
1962	Sion Mills
1963	Donemana
1964	Sion Mills
1965	Donemana
1966	Strabane
1967	Donemana
1968	Strabane
1969	Donemana
1970	Eglinton
1971	Brigade
1972	Eglinton
1973	Brigade
1974	Donemana
1975	Sion Mills
1976	Limavady
1977	Donemana
1978	Sion Mills
1979	Donemana
1980	Donemana
1981	Donemana
1982	Donemana
1983	Brigade
1984	St Johnston
1985	Donemana
1986	Donemana
1987	Donemana
1988	Donemana
1989	Donemana
1990	Donemana
1991	Donemana
1992	Donemana
1993	Donemana
1994	Limavady
1995	Limavady
1996	Limavady
1997	Limavady
1998	Limavady
1999	Limavady
2000	Limavady
2001	Brigade
2002	Brigade
2003	Donemana
2004	Brigade
2005	Donemana
2006	Brigade
2007	Brigade
2008	Donemana
2009	Limavady and Strabane (shared)
2010	Strabane
2011	Brigade
2012	Donemana
2013	Coleraine
2014	Strabane
2015	Coleraine
2016	Donemana
2017	Donemana
2018	Bready
2019	Brigade
2020	no competition (COVID19 pandemic)
2021	Bready
2022	Newbuildings
2023	Ardmore
2024	Donemana
2025	Brigade
202	Newbuildings

== Summary of winners ==
Team	Wins
Donemana	32
Sion Mills	27 (1 shared)
Brigade	16 (1 shared)
Strabane	15 (1 shared)
Limavady	10 (1 shared)
City of Derry	4
Eglinton	3
Ballymoney	2
Bready	2
Clooney	2
Coleraine	2
Newbuildings	2
Waterside	2
Ardmore	1
Eglinton	1
St Johnston	1

== See also ==
- North West Senior Cup
- Irish Senior Cup
- Leinster Senior League
- Ulster Cup
- NCU Senior League

== References for list of league champions ==
- CricketIreland Archives
- J. Clarence Hiles (2003), A History of Senior Cricket in Ulster, Comber:Hilltop Publishing Ltd
