= St Johnston Cricket Club =

St Johnston
Personnel
- Captain: Chris McCarron

Team information
- Founded: 1898
- Home ground: Boat Hole
- Official website: stjohnstoncc.hitscricket.com

St Johnston Cricket Club is a cricket club in St Johnston in the east of County Donegal in Ulster, the northern province in Ireland. The club plays in the North West Championship.

Founded in 1898, the club was the first team in the north-west of Ireland to win the Irish Senior Cup, in 1987.

== Honours ==
- Irish Senior Cup: 1
  - 1987
- North West Senior League: 1
  - 1984
- North West Senior Cup: 4
  - 1959, 1975, 1978, 1982
