= Limavady Cricket Club =

Cricket club in Northern Ireland

Limavady
Team information
- Home ground: John Hunter Grounds
- Official website: www.limavadycrfc.co.uk

Limavady Cricket Club is a cricket club in Limavady, County Londonderry, Northern Ireland, that played until 2012 in the North West Senior League.The club resigned from the league prior to the 2013 season for financial reasons and now plays junior cricket in the North West Qualifying League.

The club amalgamated with Limavady Rugby Club in 1968.

== Honours ==
- Irish Senior Cup: 3
  - 1994, 1997, 2004
- Ulster Cup:1
  - 2008
- North West Senior League: 10 (1 shared)
  - 1961, 1976, 1994, 1995, 1996, 1997, 1998, 1999, 2000, 2009 (shared)
- County Londonderry/North West Senior Cup: 10
  - 1888, 1965, 1980, 1997, 1999, 2000, 2002, 2003, 2007, 2008
