= Gary Kidd =

Irish cricketer (born 1985)

Personal information
- Full name: Gary Edward Kidd
- Born: 18 September 1985 (age 41); Craigavon, Northern Ireland
- Batting: Left-handed
- Bowling: Slow left-arm orthodox
- Role: Bowler

International information
- National side: Ireland (2004–2010)
- ODI debut (cap 21): 11 July 2007 v Netherlands
- Last ODI: 28 July 2008 v Netherlands
- Only T20I (cap 19): 3 February 2010 v Canada

Domestic team information
- Years: Team
- 2013–2018: Northern Knights

Career statistics
| Competition | ODI | T20I | FC | LA |
|---|---|---|---|---|
| Matches | 6 | 1 | 8 | 21 |
| Runs scored | 15 | 1 | 25 | 65 |
| Batting average | 15.00 | – | 4.16 | 8.12 |
| 100s/50s | 0/0 | 0/0 | 0/0 | 0/0 |
| Top score | 15 | 1* | 10 | 17* |
| Balls bowled | 216 | 18 | 1,210 | 888 |
| Wickets | 1 | 0 | 20 | 16 |
| Bowling average | 172.00 | – | 34.70 | 43.25 |
| 5 wickets in innings | 0 | – | 0 | 0 |
| 10 wickets in match | 0 | – | 0 | 0 |
| Best bowling | 1/27 | – | 3/36 | 3/31 |
| Catches/stumpings | 1/– | 0/– | 8/– | 6/– |
- Source: ESPNcricinfo, 26 August 2022

Gary Edward Kidd (born 18 September 1985) is an Irish cricketer from Northern Ireland. He is a left-handed batsman and a left-arm slow bowler. He participated in the 2004 and 2006 Under-19 World Cups for Ireland.

== Youth career (2004–2006) ==
Kidd played domestic cricket for Waringstown Cricket Club. He played for Ireland in the 2004 Under-19 Cricket World Cup in Bangladesh. He played all seven matches for Ireland and was Ireland's most economical regular bowler, bowling more overs than any other Irish bowler during the tournament. He took 8 wickets at an average of 26.37 and only conceded 3.47 runs per over. As a result of this form he was called up to make his debut for Ireland's senior team against Marylebone Cricket Club in June 2004 despite still being a schoolboy.

Kidd was young enough to again play for Ireland in the 2006 Under-19 Cricket World Cup in Sri Lanka. He was again Ireland's most economical bowler getting regular overs and he again took eight wickets. After this tournament he had played thirteen Youth One Day Internationals for Ireland with a career bowling average of 25.50.

== Senior international career (2006-2010) ==
Kidd played four games for Ireland A in the EurAsia Series in 2006. He made his List A cricket debut during the tournament against the United Arab Emirates. His form in both the Under-19 World Cup and the EurAsia series meant he was included in Ireland's squad for the ICC Intercontinental Cup for the first time in 2006, though he did not play.

Kidd was a reserve in Ireland's squad for the 2007 Cricket World Cup but was not required to play. Kidd played for MCC Young Cricketers and was then called up to play for Ireland again in the 2007 Friends Provident Trophy when their international player Jesse Ryder, from New Zealand, missed a flight. During 2007 he was also part of Ireland's Under-23s team when they defeated Scotland to become European champions. Kidd made his One Day International debut for Ireland in July against the Netherlands as part of the Quadrangular Series in Ireland in 2007.

In February 2008 Kidd went to India as part of the ICC European Cricket Academy 2008, one of four Irishmen to take part. In 2008 he made his first-class cricket debut for Ireland in the Intercontinental Cup against the Netherlands. One of his best performances for Ireland came against Norway when he took 4/25 in a comfortable eight-wicket win to kick off the 2008 European Championships.

After the European Championships Kidd had a two-year absence from Ireland's national team. In the interim he played for Ireland A and worked with the ground staff at Lord's in London before returning to Ireland to finish a university degree. In 2010 he returned to the team to play an Intercontinental Cup match against Afghanistan and played a single Twenty20 International, the first and only of his career, against Canada national cricket team in the Sri Lanka Associates T20 Series. He was then named in Ireland's squad for the 2010 ICC World Twenty20 but did not play in the tournament.
