= Beechgrove =

Cricket ground in Derry, Northern Ireland

- Location: Derry, Northern Ireland
- Country: Ireland
- Coordinates: 55°00′01.97″N 7°17′55.15″W
- End names
- Kilfennan End; Limavady Road End
- As of 12 August 2010; Source: Ground profile

Beechgrove is a cricket ground in Derry, Northern Ireland.

== Origins ==
The first first-class match on the ground was in 1963, when it hosted a match between Ireland and Scotland.

== Cricket ==
In local domestic cricket, the ground is the home of Brigade Cricket Club.
