= Eglinton Cricket Club =

Cricket club

Eglinton

Team information
- Founded: 1936
- Home ground: Woodvale Road

Eglinton Cricket Club is a cricket club in Eglinton, County Londonderry, Northern Ireland, playing in the North West Premier League.

== History ==
The club was founded in 1936. At the meeting, the chairman declared that the intent of the club was to reorganise cricket within the district with the new club and that it would have two senior teams. The club won its first trophy in 1944 by winning the North West Senior Cup. In 1984, they started to field a third senior team and also signed Sri Lankan Tony Opatha as the first overseas player within the North West Cricket Union. Eglinton regularly hosted first class cricket matches for the Ireland cricket team until 1996. They did not host another first class game again until 2009. Despite Ireland's Friends Provident Trophy match against Hampshire being called off due to the outfield not being fit, Eglinton stepped in to host Ireland for a four-day match against the Kenya national cricket team on short notice.

In 2008, Eglinton was involved in a dispute with Derry City Council. The council had constructed a nursery next to the club and demanded that they put up a fence. The club refused, citing an increase in insurance costs and argued the council should pay for it. The council declined citing it was on private land and the club stated they may have to close the club. In 2012, they were promoted after winning the North West Cricket League Two. In 2013, the club was vandalised with a liquid substance poured on the pitch. In 2024, Eglinton finished second in the North West Premier League on net run rate behind Donemana Cricket Club.

== Honours ==
- North West Senior League: 3
  - 1956, 1970, 1972
- North West Senior Cup: 9
  - 1944, 1948, 1953, 1954, 1956, 1968, 1990, 1995, 2006
