= Bob Kerr (cricket official) =

Irish cricketer and administrator

Robert James Little ('Bob') Kerr (24 August 1938 – 21 March 2007) is the former Chairman (2000–2002) and President (2004) of the Irish Cricket Union. He died as a result of a heart attack during the 2007 Cricket World Cup, days after the Irish team's historic win over Pakistan. He had been attending the event, with his wife, Hope (née Kidney).

He was born an only child in Lettin, Tempo, County Fermanagh. In January 1968, he and his wife Hope were married. They never had any children.

He was former headmaster of 'Jones Memorial Primary School', Enniskillen and Dungannon Primary School, from 1979 to 1999. He was also a former president of the Ulster Teachers Union.

A lifelong cricket enthusiast, he played into his 50s and founded the North Fermanagh Cricket Club.
