= Woodvale Road =

Cricket ground in Northern Ireland

Coordinates: 55.0278°N 7.1768°W

- Eglinton Cricket Club Ground
- Interactive map of Woodvale Road

Ground information
- Location: Eglinton, County Londonderry, Northern Ireland
- Country: Northern Ireland
- Establishment: 1936
- Capacity: 2,000
- Owner: Eglinton Cricket Club
- Operator: Cricket Ireland
- Tenants: Ireland Cricket Team
- End names
- Twaddell Avenue; McCallum Hall

International information

Team information
Eglinton Cricket Club	(1936-present)
- As of September 19, 2014; Source: espncricinfo

Woodvale Road is a cricket ground in Eglinton, Northern Ireland. The home team of the ground is Eglinton Cricket Club who were founded in 1936. It has a capacity of 2,000.

The ground has staged two first-class matches and three List A matches, a further two were abandoned without a ball bowled. It also staged a single match between Canada and the Netherlands at the 2005 ICC Trophy. The ground also hosted Ireland's opening match of the Intercontinental Cup against Kenya in 2009.

North West Cricket Union wants to make it a fully international ground as it is one of Ireland's most famous cricket venues. It has hosted a Twenty20 match, Ireland against Bangladesh A. It has also hosted North West cup finals and has seen the Australian national team take to the field.

Patrick Hughes played his last match for the Ireland cricket team here in June 1978, facing off against the MCC.
