= John Hunter Grounds =

Sports venue in Limavady, Northern Ireland

Coordinates: 55.0514°N 6.9545°W

John Hunter Memorial Grounds
Ground information
- Location: Limavady, County Londonderry, Northern Ireland
- Country: Northern Ireland
- Establishment: 1922
- Capacity: 1,000

Team information
Limavady Cricket Club

Both cricket and rugby are played at the 1,200-capacity John Hunter Grounds in Limavady, Northern Ireland.

== Team history ==
Rugby was first played in Limavady in the year 1922. On September 14th 1968 both cricket and rugby clubs in Limavady were merged. This was marked by an opening at the John Hunter Grounds, Limavady as the club's permanent home. The day is always remembered for a cricket match between the full West Indies side led by the great Sir Gary Sobers playing against an Ireland XV, and a Rugby game between an Irish XV led by Noel Murphy (former British Lions coach).

== International ==
In 2004 it hosted a 3-day match, Ireland v MCC, and in the same year they hosted a one-day match, Ireland v Bangladesh.
