= Brigade Cricket Club =

Sports club in Northern Ireland

Brigade
Personnel
- Captain: Mo Hussain
- Overseas player(s): Mo Hussain

Team information
- Founded: 1909
- Home ground: Beechgrove, Derry, County Londonderry

Brigade Cricket Club is a Northern Irish cricket club in the Waterside area of Derry, County Londonderry, Northern Ireland. They play in North West Senior Premiership. They were founded in 1909.

== History ==
Brigade Cricket Club was founded in 1909 and originally known as Church Lads' Brigade. The club adopted its current name in 1923. The club's first ground was at the Brandywell Stadium, and moved to its current ground of Beechgrove in 1921, having played for a year in 1920 in Black's Field, Glendermott Road, Waterside. Beechgrove was originally leased but Brigade purchased it outright in 1954 for £800. In 1996, Brigade won the Irish Senior Cup for the first time and repeated the success three years later in 1999. They play in the North West Premiership.

In 2022, following their 2021 All-Ireland T20 Cup victory, Brigade were selected to represent Ireland in the 2022 European Cricket League. They won their group, but in the Championship Week, they finished fourth in the group behind Spanish club Pak I Care Badalona, English club Tunbridge Wells and Italian club Brescia. They were eliminated by Brecia in the Eliminator. They also received £21,000 from the Department for Communities in that year in order to improve their facilities.

In 2023, Brigade won a North West Cricket Union cup double and finished second in the North West Senior League. They also hosted a consultation for the association football club Institute, whom were looking to build a new football stadium in the Waterside following the flooding of their Riverside Stadium, Drumahoe.

== Honours ==
- Irish Senior Cup: 2
  - 1996, 1999
- Ulster Cup: 4
  - 2001, 2003, 2012, 2016
- North West Senior League: 16 (1 shared)
  - 1930 (shared), 1936, 1937, 1944, 1945, 1971, 1973, 1983, 2001, 2002, 2004, 2006, 2007, 2011, 2019, 2020, 2025
- North West Senior Cup: 15
  - 1921, 1930, 1939, 1943, 1946, 1972, 1973, 1977, 1991, 1998, 2010, 2018, 2019, 2021, 2023
