= Andrew Poynter =

Irish cricketer (born 1987)

Personal information
- Full name: Andrew David Poynter
- Born: 25 April 1987 (age 39); Hammersmith, London, England
- Nickname: AP
- Batting: Right-handed
- Bowling: Right-arm off break
- Role: Batsman
- Relatives: Stuart Poynter (brother); Deryck Vincent (uncle)

International information
- National side: Ireland (2008–2016)
- ODI debut (cap 27): 1 July 2008 v New Zealand
- Last ODI: 12 September 2014 v Scotland
- T20I debut (cap 24): 22 March 2012 v Canada
- Last T20I: 13 March 2016 v Netherlands

Domestic team information
- Years: Team
- 2005: Middlesex

Career statistics
Competition	ODI	T20I	FC	LA
Matches	19	19	5	36
Runs scored	255	219	141	533
Batting average	19.61	19.90	28.20	18.37
100s/50s	0/2	0/1	0/1	0/4
Top score	78	57	76*	78
Balls bowled	–	–	6	30
Wickets	–	–	0	3
Bowling average	–	–	–	14.33
5 wickets in innings	–	–	–	0
10 wickets in match	–	–	–	0
Best bowling	–	–	–	2/11
Catches/stumpings	9/–	2/–	5/–	15/–
- Source: CricketArchive, 26 June 2016

Andrew David Poynter (born 25 April 1987) is an English-born Irish former cricketer.

Poynter is a right-handed batsman and off-spin bowler who was trained at the Middlesex Cricket Academy and he made his first-class debut, aged eighteen for Middlesex County Cricket Club against Cambridge UCCE at Fenner's in 2005. His uncle Deryck Vincent also represented Ireland.

== International career ==
Poynter has represented the Ireland under-19 cricket team. He played six youth ODIs, scoring 148 runs at an average of 29.60 with a top score of 76. Progressing from age group cricket, Poynter was named in the Ireland A squad to play Denmark and Marylebone Cricket Club in summer 2007. Poynter scored 78 runs against Afghanistan in a match of 2010 ICC World Cricket League Division One, where Ireland won by 39 runs and Poynter adjudged man of the match as well.

Andrew Poynter, who played in all three games at the World Twenty20 in March, announced his retirement from international and representative cricket on 2 June 2016. The 29 year-old Clontarf batsman cited family and work commitments.
