= Donemana Cricket Club =

Donemana
Team information
- Founded: 1888
- Home ground: The Holm

Donemana Cricket Club is a cricket club in Donemana, County Tyrone, Northern Ireland, playing in North West Senior League 1.

The club was founded in 1888 and won its first league title in 1948, holding on to the championship until 1955. It won nine league titles in a row between 1985 and 1993.

According to the Belfast Telegraph, Donemana is a "cricket-mad village," and :has consistently produced home-grown cricketers down the years."

== Honours ==
- Irish Senior Cup: 1
  - 2000
- Ulster Cup: 1
  - 2004
- North West Senior League: 32
  - 1948, 1949, 1950, 1951, 1952, 1960, 1963, 1965, 1967, 1969, 1974, 1977, 1979, 1980, 1981, 1982, 1985, 1986, 1987, 1988, 1989, 1990, 1991, 1992, 1993, 2003, 2005, 2008, 2012, 2016, 2017, 2024
- North West Senior Cup: 24
  - 1950, 1958, 1963, 1964, 1967, 1969, 1974, 1976, 1981, 1985, 1988, 1989, 1992, 2001, 2004, 2009, 2012, 2013, 2014, 2015, 2016, 2017, 2020, 2025
