= Bready Cricket Club =

Bready
Personnel
- Captain: David Scanlon
- Overseas player: Romano Ramoo
- Owner: Bready Cricket Club

Team information
- Colours: Maroon
- Founded: 1938; 88 years ago
- Home ground: Bready Cricket Club Ground
- Capacity: n/a

History
- Ulster Cup wins: 1
- North West Senior Cup wins: 2
- Official website: http://www.breadycricketclub.com/

Bready Cricket Club is a cricket club located in the village of Magheramason, County Tyrone, Northern Ireland, playing in North West Senior League 1. The club are the current holders of the North West Senior Cup.

Previously a successful intermediate club, the club achieved senior status in 1974.

It was selected as a venue to host matches in the 2015 ICC World Twenty20 Qualifier tournament as well as three Twenty20 International matches between Ireland and Scotland.

== Honours ==
- Ulster Cup: 1
  - 2014
- North West Senior League: 2
  - 2018, 2021
- North West Senior Cup: 2
  - 1996, 2011
