= Stuart Poynter =

English-born Irish cricketer

Personal information
- Full name: Stuart William Poynter
- Born: 18 October 1990 (age 36); Hammersmith, London, England
- Batting: Right-handed
- Role: Wicket-keeper
- Relatives: Andrew Poynter (brother); Deryck Vincent (uncle)

International information
- National side: Ireland (2011–2019)
- Only Test (cap 16): 15 March 2019 v Afghanistan
- ODI debut (cap 45): 8 September 2014 v Scotland
- Last ODI: 10 March 2019 v Afghanistan
- ODI shirt no.: 90
- T20I debut (cap 32): 18 June 2015 v Scotland
- Last T20I: 24 February 2019 v Afghanistan

Domestic team information
- Years: Team
- 2010–2011: Middlesex
- 2013: Warwickshire
- 2014–2021: Durham (squad no. 90)
- 2022: Northumberland

Career statistics
Competition	Test	ODI	FC	LA
Matches	1	21	47	47
Runs scored	1	185	1,522	581
Batting average	0.50	13.21	22.05	18.74
100s/50s	0/0	0/0	2/6	1/0
Top score	1	36	170	109
Catches/stumpings	2/1	22/1	139/4	42/3
- Source: CricketArchive, 30 May 2021

Stuart William Poynter (born 18 October 1990) is an English-born Irish cricketer who has played for Durham County Cricket Club as a wicket-keeper. He made his One Day International debut against Scotland in September 2014. He made his Twenty20 International debut against Scotland on 18 June 2015.

In December 2018, he was one of nineteen players to be awarded a central contract by Cricket Ireland for the 2019 season. In October 2019, Poynter retired from international cricket, to focus his career at Durham.

== Career ==
Poynter has represented Ireland at Under-19 and Under-17 level. He made his first-class debut against Oxford MCCU where he impressed keeping wicket, taking three catches and scoring 42 from 79 balls in a knock that included four 4's.

He has also played a first-class match for Ireland against Canada as part of the 2011–13 ICC Intercontinental Cup where he scored 31, helping Ireland to a convincing innings victory. In September 2013 he made his debut for Warwickshire due to injuries to their other keepers.

Poynter signed a deal to join Durham County Cricket Club from 2014 which Geoff Cook Durham head coach confirmed on 24 September 2013 as Durham gave Warwickshire special dispensation for Poynter to play against Derbyshire in the County Championship. Stuart Poynter marked his debut by taking six catches for Warwickshire. Poynter plays his club cricket at Sunbury CC in the Surrey Championship alongside, Toby Roland-Jones (Middlesex), Andrew Balbirnie (Ireland & Middlesex), Paul Stirling (Ireland & Middlesex) and Shane Getake (Ireland)

Poynter scored his first first-class century on 18 October 2015 in a tour match against Zimbabwe A in Harare.

In January 2019, he was named in Ireland's squad for their one-off Test against Afghanistan in India. He made his Test debut for Ireland against Afghanistan on 15 March 2019.

== Personal life ==
Poynter's uncle Deryck Vincent also represented Ireland. He is also the younger brother of retired Ireland international Andrew Poynter.
