= Waringstown Cricket Club =

Cricket club

Waringstown
Personnel
- Captain: Greg Thompson
- Coach: Lee Nelson
- Overseas player: Steve Stolk

Team information
- Colors: Red and Blue
- Founded: 1851
- Home ground: The Lawn

Waringstown Cricket Club is a cricket club in Waringstown, County Down, Northern Ireland, playing in the NCU Premier League.

The club was formed in 1851 by Captain Thomas Waring and the Henning brothers, John and George, presumably from the linen factory of John Henning & Co. in the Waringstown village. The Lawn is believed to be the second oldest cricket ground in Ulster. Waringstown was a founder member of the NCU Senior League in 1897.

== Honours ==
- Irish Senior Cup: 6
  - 1983, 1992, 2011, 2015, 2017, 2018
- All Ireland T20 Cup: 1
  - 2018
- Ulster Cup: 1
  - 2017
- NCU Senior League: 33 (6 shared)
  - 1911, 1924, 1925, 1944, 1949, 1953, 1967, 1970 (shared), 1971 (shared), 1972, 1973, 1976, 1977, 1978, 1979, 1981, 1982, 1984, 1985, 1988, 1989 (shared), 1991, 1992, 2000, 2005 (shared), 2006, 2009 (shared), 2013 (shared), 2015, 2017, 2021, 2024, 2026
- NCU Challenge Cup: 28
  - 1914, 1921, 1943, 1944, 1965, 1967, 1968, 1970, 1971, 1973, 1974, 1975, 1976, 1978, 1979, 1983, 1986, 1987, 1988, 1992, 1993, 1995, 2006, 2011, 2013, 2018, 2023, 2025.
- NCU T20 Cup: 6
  - 2007, 2012, 2016, 2017, 2018, 2023
- NCU Junior Cup: †3
  - †1997, †2002, †2024

† Won by 2nd XI
