= Stephen Smyth (cricketer) =

Irish cricketer (born 1968)

Personal information
- Full name: Stephen Gordon Smyth
- Born: 22 December 1968 (age 57); Derry, Northern Ireland
- Batting: Left-handed

Domestic team information
- Years: Team
- 1990–1999: Ireland
- 1998/99: Northern Ireland

Career statistics
Competition	First-class	List A
Matches	5	13
Runs scored	188	338
Batting average	23.50	26.00
100s/50s	0/1	0/2
Top score	70	61
Catches/stumpings	1/–	3/–
- Source: Cricinfo, 3 January 2022

Stephen Smyth (born 22 December 1968) is a former Irish cricketer. He was a left-handed batsman. He made his début for Ireland against Worcestershire in 1990, eventually playing for his country on 64 occasions, including five first-class and ten List A matches. He also represented Northern Ireland in the cricket tournament at the 1998 Commonwealth Games.

He was also a rugby union player, playing scrum-half for City of Derry R.F.C. and Ulster. Former Ireland rugby coach Murray Kidd has expressed his regret that he never selected him.
