= Strabane Cricket Club =

Sporting organisation in Northern Ireland

Strabane
Team information
- Founded: 1883
- Home ground: New Strabane Park

Strabane Cricket Club is a cricket club in Strabane, County Tyrone, Northern Ireland, playing in North West Premiership.

The club was founded in 1883, and merged with Strabane Rovers in 1903.

== Honours ==
- Irish Senior Cup: 1
  - 1998
- Ulster Cup: 1
  - 2005
- North West Senior League: 15(1 shared)
  - 1910, 1912, 1931, 1932, 1934, 1935, 1939, 1941, 1943, 1959, 1966, 1968, 2009 (shared), 2010, 2014
- North West Senior Cup: 10
  - 1903, 1912, 1925, 1936, 1937, 1938, 1941, 1966, 1987, 1993
