= Peter Gillespie =

Irish cricketer

Personal information
- Full name: Peter Gerard Gillespie
- Born: 11 May 1974 (age 52); Strabane, Northern Ireland
- Batting: Right-handed
- Bowling: Right-arm medium
- Relatives: Mark Gillespie (brother)

International information
- National side: Ireland (1995–2007)
- ODI debut (cap 3): 13 June 2006 v England
- Last ODI: 9 April 2007 v New Zealand
- ODI shirt no.: 05

Career statistics
| Competition | ODI | FC | LA |
|---|---|---|---|
| Matches | 5 | 13 | 44 |
| Runs scored | 2 | 322 | 949 |
| Batting average | 0.50 | 21.46 | 26.36 |
| 100s/50s | 0/0 | 0/2 | 0/8 |
| Top score | 2 | 53 | 74 |
| Balls bowled | – | 198 | 180 |
| Wickets | – | 5 | 2 |
| Bowling average | – | 30.60 | 84.50 |
| 5 wickets in innings | – | 0 | 0 |
| 10 wickets in match | – | 0 | 0 |
| Best bowling | – | 3/93 | 2/27 |
| Catches/stumpings | 0/– | 7/– | 5/– |
- Source: ESPNcricinfo, 2 April 2017

Peter Gerard Gillespie (born 11 May 1974) is a Northern Irish former cricketer. A right-handed batsman and right-arm medium pace bowler, he had played for the Ireland cricket team 116 times up to the start of the 2007 World Cup, including twelve first-class matches and 35 List A matches, four of which were One Day International. Only three players have played more times for Ireland.

== Playing career ==
=== Early career ===
Born 11 May 1974 in Strabane, County Tyrone, Northern Ireland, Gillespie made his debut for Ireland on 6 June 1995 against the Duchess of Norfolk's XI at Arundel Castle. He played the following day against the MCC at Lord's. Later in the month, he made his List A debut against Yorkshire in the NatWest Trophy. He then represented Ireland in the Triple Crown Tournament the following month. He played just twice for Ireland in 1996, a Benson & Hedges Cup match against Gloucestershire in May and his first-class debut against Scotland in August.

=== 1997 ICC Trophy ===
Gillespie was named in the Ireland squad for the 1997 ICC Trophy and played in nine matches. In the second round match against Hong Kong, he took 3/42, his best bowling figures in all matches for Ireland.

=== 1997 to 1999 ===
Gillespie played two more games for Ireland in 1997, both Benson & Hedges Cup games, against Middlesex and Glamorgan. In 1998, he began to become a more regular fixture in the Irish side. That year, he played against the MCC, Bangladesh, a NatWest Trophy match against Warwickshire, South Africa (twice) and Australia in addition to the Triple Crown and the European Championship. He also represented Northern Ireland in the cricket tournament at the 1998 Commonwealth Games, the only time to date that cricket has featured in the Commonwealth Games.

The following year, he played first-class matches against the South Africa Academy and Scotland and again played in the Triple Crown.

=== 2000 to 2004 ===
The 21st century started for Peter Gillespie with a trip to Zimbabwe to play in the ICC Emerging Nations tournament, highlighted by an innings of 74 against Denmark. That year he also played against the MCC, Zimbabwe and in the European Championship.

He was not selected for the Ireland squad for the 2001 ICC Trophy, but came back into the side in August, playing in the Triple Crown and in the C & G Trophy against Wiltshire and the Hampshire Cricket Board. He won the man of the match award for an innings of 66 in the match against Wiltshire.

2002 started with a C & G Trophy match against Nottinghamshire and continued with a match against West Indies A in which he scored 88, his highest score for Ireland at that time, again picking up the man of the match award. He then played in the European Championship and against the MCC and Berkshire.

2003 was a busy year, with matches against Zimbabwe, South Africa, the MCC, the Free Foresters and Hertfordshire, amongst others. In 2004, he played in Ireland's famous wins over Surrey in the C & G Trophy, which was only Ireland's second win over a first-class county and the West Indies, Ireland's third win over the West Indies, also playing in the European Championship, two matches against Bangladesh, once against the MCC and ICC Intercontinental Cup games against Scotland and the Netherlands.

=== 2005 ICC Trophy ===
Gillespie was named in the Ireland squad for the 2005 ICC Trophy and warmed up with his first century for Ireland, scoring 102 not out against the MCC in June. He played in five matches in the tournament itself, without much success until the semi-final against Canada, where he scored 64 not out to help lead Ireland to the final, winning the man of the match award in the process.

Also in 2005, he played against Loughborough UCCE, Warwickshire and Yorkshire, in addition to playing in Intercontinental Cup games against the Netherlands, Scotland, the UAE and the final against Kenya, which Ireland won.

=== 2006 and onwards ===
2006 saw Ireland gain One Day International status, and Gillespie played in the first three of Ireland's such games against England, Scotland and the Netherlands. He did not meet with much success in those games however, being dismissed for a duck in each of them. The first match saw him dismissed on the third ball, the second on the second ball, and the third on the first ball.

That year, he also played in all nine of Ireland's C & G Trophy games, against the MCC, in the European Championship and Intercontinental Cup games against Scotland and Namibia.

He was named in Ireland's squad for Division One of the World Cricket League in January/February 2007, but he only played in the match against Kenya. He then played in an Intercontinental Cup game against the UAE before being named in Ireland's squad for the 2007 World Cup.

He did not play in Ireland's first round matches as they beat Pakistan and tied against Zimbabwe to reach the Super 8 stage, and missed the first two matches in that stage before playing in the third match against New Zealand.

== Statistics ==
In all matches for Ireland up until the 2007 World Cup, Gillespie scored 2599 runs at an average of 27.65, and took 18 wickets at an average of 37.33.

== Relations ==
Gillespie comes from a cricketing family, with three other members of his family all playing for Strabane, his club side in Ireland. His brother Mark also represented Ireland internationally.
