= James McBrine =

Irish cricketer (born 1963)

Personal information
- Full name: James McBrine
- Born: 16 September 1963 (age 63); Omagh, Northern Ireland
- Batting: Right-handed
- Bowling: Right-arm medium
- Relatives: Alexander McBrine (twin brother); Andy McBrine (nephew)

Domestic team information
- Years: Team
- 1986: Ireland

Career statistics
| Competition | First-class |
|---|---|
| Matches | 1 |
| Runs scored | 29 |
| Batting average | – |
| 100s/50s | –/– |
| Top score | 27* |
| Balls bowled | 162 |
| Wickets | 0 |
| Bowling average | – |
| 5 wickets in innings | – |
| 10 wickets in match | – |
| Best bowling | – |
| Catches/stumpings | 1/– |
- Source: Cricinfo, 2 January 2022

James McBrine (born 16 September 1963 in Omagh, County Tyrone, Northern Ireland) is an Irish former cricketer. A right-handed batsman and right-arm medium pace bowler, he played just once for the Ireland cricket team, a first-class match against Scotland in August 1986. His twin brother Alexander and nephew Andy have also played cricket for Ireland.
