= Mark Gillespie (Irish cricketer) =

Irish cricketer (born 1969)

Personal information
- Full name: Mark Anthony Gillespie
- Born: 26 August 1969 (age 57); Derry, Northern Ireland
- Batting: Left-handed
- Bowling: Leg break googly
- Relatives: Peter Gillespie (brother)

Domestic team information
- Years: Team
- 2000: Ireland

Career statistics
Competition	First-class
Matches	1
Runs scored	56
Batting average	28.00
100s/50s	0/0
Top score	34
Balls bowled	146
Wickets	4
Bowling average	18.75
5 wickets in innings	0
10 wickets in match	0
Best bowling	2/34
Catches/stumpings	0/–
- Source: Cricinfo, 19 October 2021

Mark Anthony Gillespie (born 26 August 1969) is an Irish cricketer born at Derry. A left-handed batsman and leg spin bowler, he played four times for the Ireland cricket team between 2000 and 2001.

== Career ==
In 2000, he played his only first-class match, against Scotland in August. The following year, he represented Ireland in the Triple Crown Tournament.

He has not played for Ireland since, though he continues to be active in Irish club cricket, playing for Strabane. His brother Peter also represents Ireland at cricket and was named in the Ireland squad for the 2007 World Cup.
