= Junior McBrine =

Irish cricketer

Cricket information
- Batting: Right-handed
- Bowling: Slow left-arm orthodox

International information
- National side: Ireland

Career statistics
Competition	First-class	List A
Matches	4	5
Runs scored	155	59
Batting average	25.83	14.75
100s/50s	1/0	0/0
Top score	102	0
Balls bowled	594	330
Wickets	6	2
Bowling average	36.83	105.50
5 wickets in innings	0	0
10 wickets in match	0	0
Best bowling	3/64	1/22
Catches/stumpings	1/0	1/0
- Source: CricketArchive, 31 October 2021

Alexander "Junior" McBrine (born 16 September 1963) is an Irish former cricketer. A right-handed batsman and left-arm orthodox spin bowler, he played 35 times for the Ireland cricket team between 1985 and 1994, including four first-class matches against Scotland and five List A matches. His twin brother James and son Andy have also played cricket for Ireland.

== Cricket career ==
Junior McBrine made his debut for Ireland in June 1985, playing against Scotland in a first-class match. His second match, against Sussex in the NatWest Trophy, was his List A debut. He played four more times for Ireland that year, including a match against Australia and another one against the MCC at Lord's.

A tour to Zimbabwe was the first port of call for McBrine in 1986, the home season starting with two matches each against India and Yorkshire. He also played against Wales, Leicestershire, the MCC and Scotland later that year. He played several matches the following year, including internationals against Pakistan, Scotland and Wales.

After being a regular member of the side throughout his first three years, his appearances for Ireland became more sporadic starting in 1988, when he played just once, against Wales. He played twice against Northamptonshire in 1989, before a three-year break from the Irish side, returning in June 1992 for a match against Middlesex. He also played his final first-class match against Scotland that year, along with a match against Durham. His final match for Ireland was against Leicestershire in the Benson & Hedges Cup.

=== Statistics ===
In all matches for Ireland, McBrine scored 654 runs at an average of 22.55, with a top score of 102 against Scotland in July 1987, his only century for Ireland. He took 44 wickets at an average of 40.52, with best innings bowling figures of 4/38 against Matabeleland in January 1986.
