= Jonathan Bushe =

Irish cricketer

Cricket information
- Batting: Left-handed

Career statistics
Competition	First-class	List A
Matches	1	5
Runs scored	6	–
Batting average	6.00	–
100s/50s	0/0	–
Top score	4*	–
Catches/stumpings	3/1	6/2
- Source: CricketArchive, 30 December 2021

Jonathan Alexander Bushe (born 12 December 1978) is an Irish cricketer. He is a left-handed batsman and a wicket-keeper.

He played for the Ireland Under-19 team at the 1998 Under-19 World Cup, before making his debut for the Ireland senior team against Scotland in June 1998. He remained a regular member of the team for the following two years, playing a first-class match against Australia A later in 1998. He made his List A debut in the ICC Emerging Nations tournament in 2000, and played two matches against Zimbabwe later in the same year.

He returned to the Irish team in August 2003, playing against the Duke of Norfolk's XI. He remained in the team for a further year, winning his 29th and, to date, last cap against Bangladesh on 30 August 2004 in what was a Bangladeshi warm-up match for the 2004 ICC Champions Trophy.
