= List of five-wicket hauls in women's One Day International cricket =

WODI

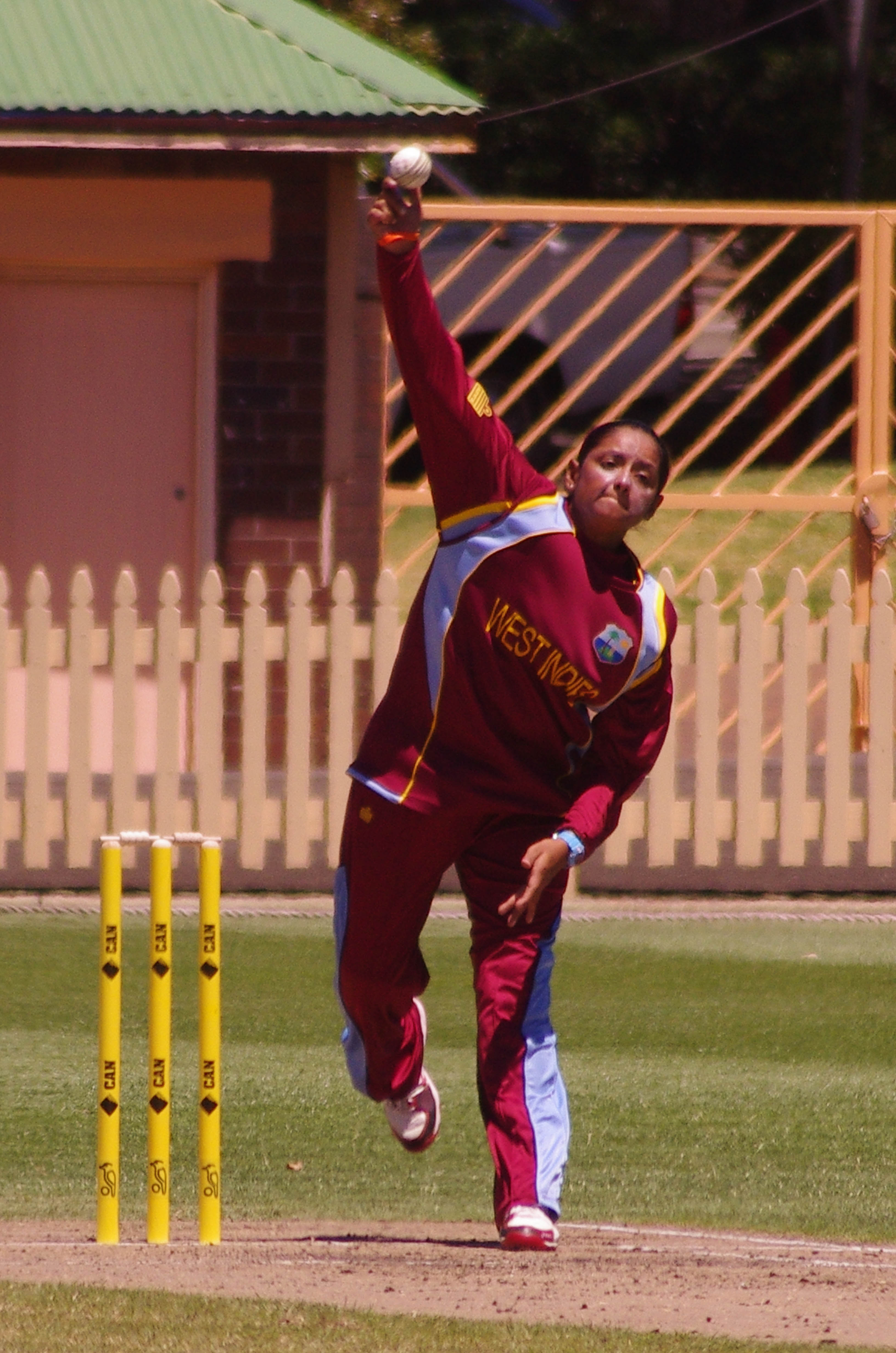
Anisa Mohammed of the West Indies is the only player to take six five-wicket hauls in WODIs.

A women's One Day International (WODI) is an international cricket match between two teams, each having WODI status, as determined by the International Cricket Council (ICC). In a WODI match, the two teams play a single innings, each of which is restricted to a maximum of 50 overs. (Note: For the first 25 years of ODI cricket the number of overs bowled in each innings varied between 35 and 60 overs.) The first WODI matches were played as part of the 1973 Women's Cricket World Cup held in England, two years after the first men's One Day International was contested between Australia and England in January 1971. A five-wicket haul (also known as a "five-for" or "fifer") refers to a bowler taking five or more wickets in a single innings. This is regarded as a notable achievement. The first two five-wicket hauls in WODIs were taken on 23 June 1973, as part of the Women's World Cup. Australia's Tina Macpherson and New Zealand's Glenys Page both achieved the feat as part of their teams' victories over Young England and Trinidad and Tobago respectively. Macpherson and Page are two of only seven players to take a five-wicket haul during their WODI debut, the others being India's Purnima Choudhary, Laura Harper and Linsey Smith of England, Felicity Leydon-Davis from New Zealand, and Zimbabwe's Kelis Ndhlovu.

Suthershini Sivanantham has taken the most economical five-wicket haul with an economy rate of just 0.21. Bowling for Sri Lanka, she took five wickets for just two runs against Pakistan at Moors Sports Club Ground in Colombo in January 2002. The least economical five-wicket haul was taken by New Zealand's Amelia Kerr with an economy rate of 6.94. There have only been 17 occurrences that did not result in a victory to the team taking the five-wicket haul.

There have been six occasions where two five-wicket hauls have been taken in the same match. The first was during the 2005 Women's Cricket World Cup in South Africa. India's Neetu David took figures of 5/32 in the first innings with Louise Milliken of New Zealand taking 5/25 to lead her side to victory. The second was during the 2007 Women's European Cricket Championship in Deventer where Annemarie Tanke of the Netherlands finished with 5/40. In reply, Ciara Metcalfe returned career best figures of 5/18 to help steer Ireland to victory. The third was the first ODI of Zimbabwe's 2023 tour of Thailand, which saw Kelis Ndhlovu (Zimbabwe, 5/22) and Thipatcha Putthawong (Thailand, 6/6) become the first players to achieve the feat for their respective countries in women's ODIs. The fourth was the first ODI of the West Indies 2024 tour of India, which saw Zaida James (West Indies, 5/45) and Renuka Singh Thakur (India, 5/29) take five-wicket hauls. The fifth was a match in the 2025 Women's Cricket World Cup Qualifier, which saw Fahima Khatun (Bangladesh, 5/21) and Jannatul Ferdus (Bangladesh, 5/7) take five-wicket hauls. The sixth was the sixth ODI of the 2025 Sri Lanka Women's Tri-Nation Series, which saw Dewmi Vihanga (Sri Lanka, 5/43) and Chloe Tryon (South Africa, 5/34) take five-wicket hauls.

Anisa Mohammed of the West Indies tops the list as the only bowler to have achieved the feat six times. She is followed by Katherine Brunt of England and South Africa's Suné Luus with five five-wicket hauls, Australian Cathryn Fitzpatrick and India's Deepti Sharma with four and New Zealand's Holly Huddleston, Alana King and Ellyse Perry of Australia, England's Kate Cross and New Zealand's Amelia Kerr with three. Fitzpatrick is also the oldest player to achieve to take a fifer, taking her final five-wicket haul seven days short of her 38th birthday. Seven bowlers have taken a seven-wicket haul in a WODI, with Pakistan's Sajjida Shah returning the best figures in the format with seven wickets for just four runs. Playing in the 2003 IWCC Trophy against Japan in their debut WODI match, Shah is also the youngest bowler, aged just 15 years and 168 days, to take five wickets in an innings. The other bowlers to take seven wickets in an innings are Jo Chamberlain of England who took 7/8 against Denmark during the 1991 European Women's Cricket Championship; Mohammed who took 7/14 in a player of the match performance to help the West Indies win the final of the 2011 Women's Cricket World Cup Qualifier tournament against Pakistan, Australia's Alana King who finished with 7/18 during the 2025 Women's Cricket World Cup against South Africa, Perry who took 7/22 in the third WODI against England during the 2019 Women's Ashes series, Australia's Shelley Nitschke who finished with 7/24 during the 2005 Women's Ashes series, and New Zealand's Amelia Kerr who took 7/34 against Zimbabwe in 2026. A further 20 players have taken a six-wicket haul.

As of October 2026, 163 five-wicket hauls have been taken by 112 different players from over 1,500 WODI matches. England lead the list with 30 five-wicket hauls, followed by Australia with 26 and New Zealand with 25. Bert Sutcliffe Oval in Lincoln, New Zealand, leads the list of where the most five-wicket hauls have been taken with nine, ahead of Derby County Cricket Ground with six and Grace Road with five.

== Key ==
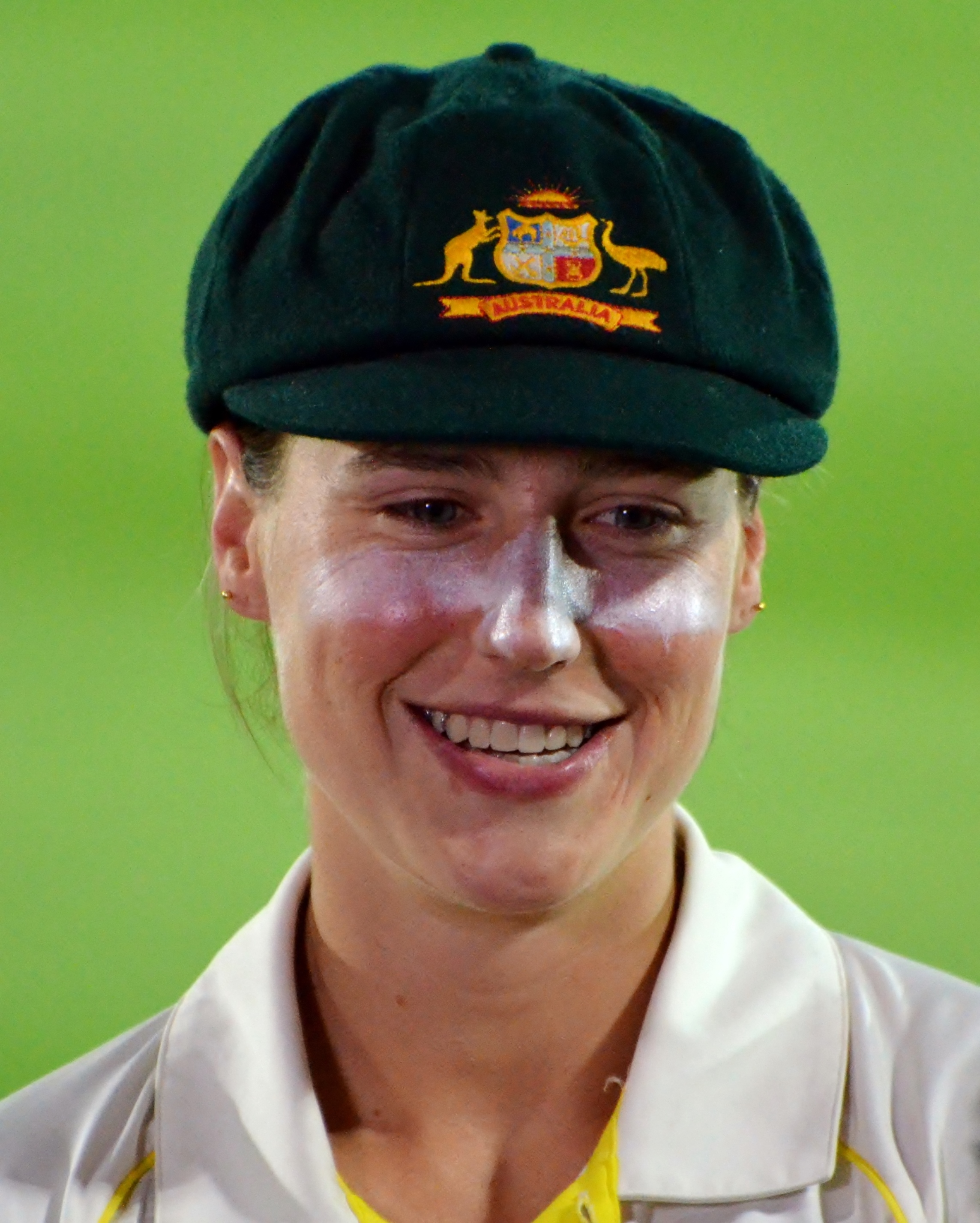
Ellyse Perry is one of seven players to have taken a WODI seven-wicket haul.

Key
| Symbol | Meaning |
|---|---|
| Bowler | The bowler who took the five-wicket haul |
| † | The bowler was player of the match |
| Wkts | Number of wickets taken |
| Runs | Number of runs conceded |
| Overs | Number of overs bowled |
| Econ | Economy rate (runs conceded per over) |
| Inn | Innings in which the five-wicket haul was taken |
| Team | The team the bowler was representing |
| Opposition | The team the bowler was playing against |
| Venue | The cricket ground where the match was played |
| Date | Day on which the match was held |
| Batters | Batters whose wickets were taken |
| Result | Result for the team for which the five-wicket haul was taken |
| | Light blue background indicates this happened during a Women's Cricket World Cup match. |

== Five-wicket hauls ==
Women's One Day International cricket five-wicket hauls
| No. | Bowler | Wkts | Runs | Overs | Econ | Inn | Team | Opposition | Venue | Date | Batters | Result | Ref |
|---|---|---|---|---|---|---|---|---|---|---|---|---|---|
| 1 | Tina Macpherson (Note: No player of the match was awarded.) | 5 | 14 | 12 | 1.16 | 1 | Australia | Young England | Dean Park Cricket Ground, Bournemouth, England | 23 June 1973 | Susan Goatman; Megan Lear; Margaret Wilks; Rosalind Heggs; Katherine Brown | Won | |
| 2 | Glenys Page | 6 | 20 | 6.2 | 3.15 | 2 | New Zealand | Trinidad and Tobago | Clarence Park, St Albans, England | 23 June 1973 | Emelda Noreiga; Jane Joseph; Joyce Demmin; Jasmine Sammy; Maureen Phillips; Janice Moses | Won | |
| 3 | Jackie Lord | 6 | 10 | 8 | 1.25 | 2 | New Zealand | India | Cornwall Park, Auckland, New Zealand | 14 January 1982 | Shantha Rangaswamy; Nilima Jogalekar; Diana Edulji; Lopamudra Bhattacharji; Sujata Sridhar; Sharmila Chakraborty | Won | |
| 4 | Lyn Fullston (1/2) | 5 | 27 | 12 | 2.25 | 2 | Australia | New Zealand | Basin Reserve, Wellington, New Zealand | 28 January 1982 | Nicki Turner; Debbie Hockley; Jackie Lord; Sue Brown; Maureen Peters | Won | |
| 5 | Jenny Owens | 5 | 29 | 10.2 | 2.80 | 2 | Australia | Ireland | College Park, Dublin, Ireland | 1 July 1987 | Mary-Pat Moore; Elizabeth Owens; Rachel Hardiman; Grainne Clancy; Susan Bray | Won | |
| 6 | Lyn Fullston (2/2) | 5 | 28 | 12 | 2.33 | 2 | Australia | Netherlands | Carey Baptist Grammar School Oval No. 2, Melbourne, Australia | 14 December 1988 | Irene Schoof; Anita van Lier; Nicola Payne; Ingrid Dulfer-Keijzer; Vanda Wesenhagen | Won | |
| 7 | Jo Chamberlain † (1/2) | 5 | 18 | 10.4 | 1.68 | 2 | England | Ireland | Nykøbing Mors Cricket Club Ground, Nykøbing Mors, Denmark | 21 July 1989 | Mary-Pat Moore; Janice Walsh; Julie Logue; Susan Bray; Anne-Marie Garth | Won | |
| 8 | Karen Gunn | 5 | 22 | 9 | 2.44 | 1 | New Zealand | Australia | Hutt Recreation Ground, Lower Hutt, New Zealand | 10 February 1990 | Belinda Haggett; Zoe Goss; Denise Annetts; Christina Matthews; Sally Moffat | Won | |
| 9 | Susan Bray | 5 | 27 | 11 | 2.45 | 2 | Ireland | Denmark | Leicester Ivanhoe Cricket Club Ground, Kirby Muxloe, England | 18 July 1990 | Vibeke Nielsen; Charlotte Smith; Betina Langerhuus; Lene Hansen; Heidi Jensen | Won | |
| 10 | Gillian Smith (1/2) | 5 | 15 | 5.3 | 2.72 | 2 | England | Denmark | John Player Ground, Nottingham, England | 19 July 1990 | Janni Jønsson; Trine Christiansen; Susanne Nielsen; Lene Hansen; Mette Frost | Won | |
| 11 | Jo Chamberlain (2/2) | 7 | 8 | 9 | 0.88 | 1 | England | Denmark | Sportpark Koninklijke HFC, Haarlem, Netherlands | 19 July 1991 | Vibeke Nielsen; Jane Jensen; Dorte Christiansen; Janni Jønsson; Charlotte Smith; Trine Christiansen; Lene Hansen | Won | |
| 12 | Joanne Broadbent | 5 | 10 | 6.2 | 1.57 | 2 | Australia | New Zealand | Oakes Oval, Lismore, Australia | 13 January 1993 | Sarah Illingworth; Karen Gunn; Sarah McLauchlan; Catherine Campbell; Julie Harris | Won | |
| 13 | Jennifer Turner | 5 | 5 | 11.2 | 0.44 | 1 | New Zealand | Netherlands | Lindfield Cricket Club Ground, Sussex, England | 25 July 1993 | Anita van Lier; Jet van Noortwijk; Ingrid Dulfer-Keijzer; Inge Kure; Saskia Melchers | Won | |
| 14 | Gillian Smith (2/2) | 5 | 30 | 12 | 2.50 | 2 | England | Australia | Woodbridge Road, Guildford, England | 26 July 1993 | Zoe Goss; Sally Griffiths; Lyn Larsen; Joanne Broadbent; Karen Brown | Won | |
| 15 | Cherry-Ann Singh | 5 | 36 | 12 | 3.00 | 2 | West Indies | Ireland | Dorking Cricket Club Ground, Dorking, England | 29 July 1993 | Janice Walsh; Mary-Pat Moore; Catherine O'Neill; Stella Owens; Miriam Grealey | Won | |
| 16 | Cheraldine Oudolf | 5 | 20 | 8 | 2.50 | 1 | Netherlands | Sri Lanka | Asgiriya Stadium, Kandy, Sri Lanka | 30 November 1997 | Dona Indralatha; Hiruka Fernando; Kalpana Liyanarachchi; Vanessa Bowen; Rasanjali Silva | Won | |
| 17 | Purnima Choudhary † | 5 | 21 | 8 | 2.62 | 2 | India | West Indies | Nahar Singh Stadium, Faridabad, India | 13 December 1997 | Marlene Needham; Roselyn Emmanuel; Ann McEwen; Desiree Luke; Ann Browne | Won | |
| 18 | Cathryn Fitzpatrick (1/4) | 5 | 47 | 10 | 4.70 | 2 | Australia | England | Lord's, London, England | 21 July 1998 | Barbara Daniels; Charlotte Edwards; Clare Connor; Susan Metcalfe; Melissa Reynard | Won | |
| 19 | Rachel Pullar (1/2) | 5 | 7 | 7 | 1.00 | 1 | New Zealand | South Africa | Seddon Park, Hamilton, New Zealand | 17 February 1999 | Cindy Eksteen; Kerri Laing; Leslie Korkie; Ally Kuylaars; Sune van Zyl | Won | |
| 20 | Clare Connor † | 5 | 49 | 10 | 4.90 | 1 | England | India | County Cricket Ground, Northampton, England | 9 July 1999 | Anju Jain; Purnima Rau; Rupanjali Shastri; Hemlata Kala; Anjum Chopra | Lost | |
| 21 | Laura Harper † | 5 | 12 | 8.4 | 1.38 | 1 | England | Netherlands | Nykøbing Mors Cricket Club Ground, Nykøbing Mors, Denmark | 19 July 1999 | Carolien Salomons; Debbie Kooij; Cheraldine Oudolf; Sandra Kottman; Elise Reynolds | Won | |
| 22 | Charmaine Mason (1/2) | 5 | 30 | 9.4 | 3.10 | 2 | Australia | England | Sydney Cricket Ground, Sydney, Australia | 30 January 2000 | Charlotte Edwards; Kathryn Leng; Karen Smithies; Laura Newton; Dawn Holden | Won | |
| 23 | Charmaine Mason (2/2) | 5 | 9 | 6 | 1.50 | 2 | Australia | England | Newcastle Number 1 Sports Ground, Newcastle, Australia | 3 February 2000 | Karen Smithies; Barbara Daniels; Charlotte Edwards; Clare Connor; Lucy Pearson | Won | |
| 24 | Sarah Collyer | 5 | 32 | 10 | 3.20 | 2 | England | Netherlands | Bert Sutcliffe Oval, Lincoln, New Zealand | 30 November 2000 | Maartje Köster; Rowan Milburn; Tessa van der Gun; Carly Verheul; Teuntje de Boer | Won | |
| 25 | Shaiza Khan † (1/2) | 5 | 35 | 10 | 3.50 | 1 | Pakistan | Netherlands | National Stadium, Karachi, Pakistan | 11 April 2001 | Helmien Rambaldo; Carolien Salomons; Pauline te Beest; Carly Verheul; Iris Jharap | Won | |
| 26 | Shaiza Khan (2/2) | 5 | 38 | 10 | 3.80 | 1 | Pakistan | Netherlands | National Stadium, Karachi, Pakistan | 14 April 2001 | Annemarie Tanke; Helmien Rambaldo; Caroline Rambaldo; Eugenie van Leeuwen; Cheraldine Oudolf | Won | |
| 27 | Cathryn Fitzpatrick (2/4) | 5 | 14 | 10 | 1.40 | 1 | Australia | Ireland | College Park, Dublin, Ireland | 14 July 2001 | Anne Linehan; Grainne Leahy; Caitriona Beggs; Nikki Squire; Isobel Joyce | Won | |
| 28 | Suthershini Sivanantham | 5 | 2 | 9.3 | 0.21 | 2 | Sri Lanka | Pakistan | Moors Sports Club Ground, Colombo, Sri Lanka | 22 January 2002 | Rabia Khan; Batool Fatima; Khursheed Jabeen; Huda Ziad; Sabeen Rezvi | Won | |
| 29 | Rachel Pullar (2/2) | 5 | 10 | 7 | 1.42 | 2 | New Zealand | India | Grainville Cricket Ground, Saint Saviour, Jersey | 11 July 2002 | Sulakshana Naik; Mithali Raj; Mamatha Maben; Sunetra Paranjpe; Deepa Marathe | Won | |
| 30 | Nooshin Al Khadeer | 5 | 14 | 6.5 | 2.04 | 1 | India | England | Bert Sutcliffe Oval, Lincoln, New Zealand | 27 January 2003 | Laura Newton; Sarah Collyer; Laura Harper; Clare Taylor; Lucy Pearson | Won | |
| 31 | Cathryn Fitzpatrick (3/4) | 5 | 27 | 9.1 | 2.94 | 1 | Australia | New Zealand | Bert Sutcliffe Oval, Lincoln, New Zealand | 6 February 2003 | Rebecca Rolls; Emily Drumm; Maia Lewis; Sara McGlashan; Rebecca Steele | Won | |
| 32 | Sandamali Dolawatta | 5 | 16 | 8 | 2.00 | 1 | Sri Lanka | West Indies | Arnos Vale Stadium, Kingstown, Saint Vincent and the Grenadines | 22 March 2003 | Glenicia James; Shane de Silva; Juliana Nero; Doris Francis; Philipa Thomas | Won | |
| 33 | Sajjida Shah | 7 | 4 | 8 | 0.50 | 2 | Pakistan | Japan | Sportpark Drieburg, Amsterdam, Netherlands | 21 July 2003 | Ema Kuribayashi; Yūko Sasaki; Maki Kenjo; Izumi Iimura; Aya Fujishiro; Momoko Saito; Ritsuko Hiroto | Won | |
| 34 | Neetu David † (1/2) | 5 | 20 | 9.4 | 2.06 | 1 | India | West Indies | Keenan Stadium, Jamshedpur, India | 29 February 2004 | Nadine George; Juliana Nero; Stephanie Power; Philipa Thomas; Doris Francis | Won | |
| 35 | Rosalie Birch † | 5 | 50 | 9.5 | 5.08 | 2 | England | South Africa | Senwes Park, Potchefstroom, South Africa | 1 March 2004 | Alison Hodgkinson; Sune van Zyl; Shafeeqa Pillay; Shandre Fritz; Ashlyn Kilowan | Won | |
| 36 | Urooj Mumtaz † (1/2) | 5 | 33 | 10 | 3.30 | 1 | Pakistan | West Indies | Asghar Ali Shah Cricket Stadium, Karachi, Pakistan | 23 March 2004 | Juliana Nero; Debbie-Ann Lewis; Philipa Thomas; Jacqueline Robinson; Doris Francis | Lost | |
| 37 | Mamatha Maben | 6 | 10 | 6.2 | 1.57 | 1 | India | Sri Lanka | Asgiriya Stadium, Kandy, Sri Lanka | 25 April 2004 | Randika Galhenage; Shashikala Siriwardene; Chamani Seneviratne; Dedunu Silva; Chamari Polgampola; Janakanthy Mala | Won | |
| 38 | Amanda Green | 5 | 15 | 9.3 | 1.57 | 2 | New Zealand | Ireland | Anglesea Road, Dublin, Ireland | 24 July 2004 | Cecelia Joyce; Heather Whelan; Barbara McDonald; Marianne Herbert; Jo Day | Won | |
| 39 | Isa Guha (1/2) | 5 | 22 | 10 | 2.20 | 2 | England | New Zealand | County Ground, Derby, England | 15 August 2004 | Maria Fahey; Maia Lewis; Haidee Tiffen; Aimee Mason; Sara McGlashan | Won | |
| 40 | Neetu David (2/2) | 5 | 32 | 10 | 3.20 | 1 | India | New Zealand | Technikon Oval, Pretoria, South Africa | 30 March 2005 | Aimee Mason; Haidee Tiffen; Helen Watson; Rachel Pullar; Sara McGlashan | Lost | |
| 41 | Louise Milliken † | 5 | 25 | 10 | 2.50 | 2 | New Zealand | India | Technikon Oval, Pretoria, South Africa | 30 March 2005 | Jaya Sharma; Anju Jain; Anjum Chopra; Jhulan Goswami; Deepa Marathe | Won | |
| 42 | Shelley Nitschke † | 7 | 24 | 7.4 | 3.13 | 2 | Australia | England | Chester Road North Ground, Kidderminster, England | 19 August 2005 | Clare Connor; Arran Brindle; Laura Newton; Lydia Greenway; Beth Morgan; Clare Taylor; Jo Watts | Won | |
| 43 | Jhulan Goswami † (1/2) | 5 | 16 | 10 | 1.60 | 1 | India | England | Satindra Mohan Dev Stadium, Silchar, India | 7 December 2005 | Charlotte Edwards; Rosalie Birch; Arran Brindle; Beth Morgan; Nicky Shaw | Won | |
| 44 | Cathryn Fitzpatrick (4/4) | 5 | 29 | 8.3 | 3.41 | 1 | Australia | India | St Peter's College, Adelaide, Australia | 25 February 2006 | Jaya Sharma; Sunetra Paranjpe; Mithali Raj; Nooshin Al Khadeer; Amita Sharma | Won | |
| 45 | Qanita Jalil | 5 | 62 | 10 | 6.20 | 1 | Pakistan | India | Sawai Mansingh Stadium, Jaipur, India | 13 December 2006 | Sulakshana Naik; Mithali Raj; Rumeli Dhar; Jhulan Goswami; Nooshin Al Khadeer | Lost | |
| 46 | Urooj Mumtaz (2/2) | 5 | 40 | 6.5 | 5.85 | 1 | Pakistan | South Africa | Harlequins, Pretoria, South Africa | 22 January 2007 | Cri-Zelda Brits; Trisha Chetty; Sunette Loubser; Susan Benade; Shabnim Ismail | Lost | |
| 47 | Annemarie Tanke | 5 | 40 | 9.5 | 4.06 | 1 | Netherlands | Ireland | Sportpark Het Schootsveld, Deventer, Netherlands | 17 August 2007 | Nicola Coffey; Isobel Joyce; Ciara Metcalfe; Elaine Nolan; Jean Carroll | Lost | |
| 48 | Ciara Metcalfe | 5 | 18 | 8.5 | 2.03 | 2 | Ireland | Netherlands | Sportpark Het Schootsveld, Deventer, Netherlands | 17 August 2007 | Jacqueline Pashley; Marijn Nijman; Caroline de Fouw; Mandy Kornet; Jolet Hartenhof | Won | |
| 49 | Beth McNeill | 6 | 32 | 10 | 3.20 | 2 | New Zealand | England | Bert Sutcliffe Oval, Lincoln, New Zealand | 24 February 2008 | Claire Taylor; Lydia Greenway; Jenny Gunn; Nicky Shaw; Rosalie Birch; Katherine Brunt | Won | |
| 50 | Alicia Smith † | 5 | 7 | 8 | 0.87 | 1 | South Africa | Pakistan | Stellenbosch University Ground No. 1, Stellenbosch, South Africa | 24 February 2008 | Bismah Maroof; Sajjida Shah; Tasqeen Qadeer; Nain Abidi; Sana Mir | Won | |
| 51 | Emma Sampson | 5 | 30 | 10 | 3.00 | 2 | Australia | New Zealand | Bert Sutcliffe Oval, Lincoln, New Zealand | 15 March 2008 | Aimee Mason; Katey Martin; Nicola Browne; Lucy Doolan; Helen Watson | Won | |
| 52 | Isa Guha (2/2) | 5 | 14 | 8 | 1.75 | 1 | England | West Indies | Haslegrave Ground, Loughborough, England | 12 July 2008 | Stafanie Taylor; Deandra Dottin; Stacy-Ann King; Juliana Nero; Chedean Nation | Won | |
| 53 | Katherine Brunt (1/5) | 5 | 25 | 10 | 2.50 | 2 | England | South Africa | Lord's, London, England | 8 August 2008 | Alicia Smith; Claire Terblanche; Olivia Anderson; Trisha Chetty; Susan Benade | Won | |
| 54 | Laura Marsh † | 5 | 15 | 10 | 1.50 | 1 | England | Pakistan | North Sydney Oval, Sydney, Australia | 12 March 2009 | Sukhan Faiz; Nain Abidi; Sajjida Shah; Sana Mir; Urooj Mumtaz | Won | |
| 55 | Eimear Richardson † | 5 | 13 | 9.4 | 1.34 | 1 | Ireland | Netherlands | The Vineyard, Dublin, Ireland | 5 August 2009 | Annemarie Tanke; Marijn Nijman; Alarda Mol; Denise Hannema; Evelien Gerrits | Won | |
| 56 | Ellyse Perry (1/3) | 5 | 31 | 9.3 | 3.26 | 1 | Australia | New Zealand | Junction Oval, Melbourne, Australia | 17 February 2010 | Aimee Watkins; Sara McGlashan; Sophie Devine; Morna Nielsen; Kate Pulford | Won | |
| 57 | Katherine Brunt (2/5) | 5 | 22 | 10 | 2.20 | 2 | England | India | M. Chinnaswamy Stadium, Bangalore, India | 21 February 2010 | Anagha Deshpande; Anjum Chopra; Priyanka Roy; Rumeli Dhar; Preeti Dimri | Won | |
| 58 | Lisa Sthalekar | 5 | 35 | 8 | 4.37 | 1 | Australia | New Zealand | Queens Park, Invercargill, New Zealand | 7 March 2010 | Sophie Devine; Sara McGlashan; Nicola Browne; Rachel Priest; Kate Pulford | Won | |
| 59 | Jenny Gunn † (1/2) | 5 | 31 | 10 | 3.10 | 1 | England | New Zealand | County Cricket Ground, Derby, England | 15 July 2010 | Lucy Doolan; Maria Fahey; Suzie Bates; Sara McGlashan; Liz Perry | Won | |
| 60 | Sana Mir | 5 | 32 | 9 | 3.55 | 2 | Pakistan | Netherlands | North West University No 2 Ground, Potchefstroom, South Africa | 9 October 2010 | Esther Lanser; Denise Hannema; Annemarie Tanke; Marloes Braat; Marijn Nijman | Won | |
| 61 | Jhulan Goswami (2/2) | 6 | 31 | 10 | 3.10 | 1 | India | New Zealand | Walker Cricket Ground, London, England | 5 July 2011 | Frances Mackay; Sara McGlashan; Lucy Doolan; Katey Martin; Nicola Browne; Kate Broadmore | Lost | |
| 62 | Katherine Brunt † (3/5) | 5 | 18 | 10 | 1.80 | 2 | England | Australia | Sir Paul Getty's Ground, Buckinghamshire, England | 7 July 2011 | Meg Lanning; Leah Poulton; Shelley Nitschke; Jess Cameron; Sarah Coyte | Won | |
| 63 | Anisa Mohammed † (1/6) | 5 | 5 | 10 | 0.50 | 1 | West Indies | Pakistan | Arnos Vale Stadium, Kingstown, Saint Vincent and the Grenadines | 28 August 2011 | Mariam Hasan; Nain Abidi; Marina Iqbal; Nida Dar; Batool Fatima | Won | |
| 64 | Anisa Mohammed † (2/6) | 5 | 7 | 10 | 0.70 | 2 | West Indies | Pakistan | Arnos Vale Stadium, Kingstown, Saint Vincent and the Grenadines | 30 August 2011 | Javeria Khan; Nain Abidi; Rabiya Shah; Bismah Maroof; Batool Fatima | Won | |
| 65 | Sunette Loubser † | 5 | 27 | 10 | 2.70 | 2 | South Africa | Sri Lanka | Khan Shaheb Osman Ali Stadium, Fatullah, Bangladesh | 14 November 2011 | Chamari Atapattu; Yashoda Mendis; Shashikala Siriwardene; Eshani Kaushalya; Chamani Seneviratne | Won | |
| 66 | Anisa Mohammed † (3/6) | 5 | 26 | 10 | 2.60 | 1 | West Indies | Pakistan | Bangladesh Krira Shikkha Protisthan No 2 Ground, Dhaka, Bangladesh | 17 November 2011 | Bismah Maroof; Sana Mir; Nida Dar; Nahida Khan; Asmavia Iqbal | Won | |
| 67 | Shabnim Ismail † (1/2) | 6 | 10 | 8.3 | 1.17 | 2 | South Africa | Netherlands | Bangladesh Krira Shikkha Protisthan No 2 Ground, Dhaka, Bangladesh | 18 November 2011 | Denise Hannema; Miranda Veringmeier; Kerry-Anne Tomlinson; Carlijn de Groot; Laura Brouwers; Esther de Lange | Won | |
| 68 | Anisa Mohammed † (4/6) | 7 | 14 | 8.3 | 1.64 | 2 | West Indies | Pakistan | Sher-e-Bangla National Cricket Stadium, Dhaka, Bangladesh | 26 November 2011 | Bismah Maroof; Qanita Jalil; Sana Mir; Asmavia Iqbal; Nain Abidi; Rabiya Shah; Sadia Yousuf | Won | |
| 69 | Ellyse Perry (2/3) | 5 | 19 | 8.1 | 2.32 | 2 | Australia | India | Wankhede Stadium, Mumbai, India | 14 March 2012 | Punam Raut; Sulakshana Naik; Anjum Chopra; Ekta Bisht; Gouher Sultana | Won | |
| 70 | Anisa Mohammed (5/6) | 5 | 34 | 9.3 | 3.57 | 2 | West Indies | Sri Lanka | Kensington Oval, Bridgetown, Barbados | 25 April 2012 | Shashikala Siriwardene; Dilani Manodara; Sripali Weerakkody; Maduri Samuddika; Inoka Ranaweera | Won | |
| 71 | Dane van Niekerk (1/2) | 5 | 28 | 7 | 4.00 | 2 | South Africa | West Indies | Warner Park Stadium, Basseterre, Saint Kitts and Nevis | 7 January 2013 | Deandra Dottin; Shemaine Campbelle; Shaquana Quintyne; Anisa Mohammed; Tremayne Smartt | Won | |
| 72 | Rachel Candy † | 5 | 19 | 10 | 1.90 | 1 | New Zealand | Pakistan | Barabati Stadium, Cuttack, India | 3 February 2013 | Javeria Khan; Sana Mir; Nain Abidi; Asmavia Iqbal; Sumaiya Siddiqi | Won | |
| 73 | Anya Shrubsole † (1/2) | 5 | 17 | 10 | 1.70 | 1 | England | South Africa | Barabati Stadium, Cuttack, India | 10 February 2013 | Yolandi Potgieter; Mignon du Preez; Trisha Chetty; Cri-Zelda Brits; Marizanne Kapp | Won | |
| 74 | Jenny Gunn † (2/2) | 5 | 22 | 10 | 2.20 | 2 | England | Pakistan | Louth Cricket Club Ground, Louth, England | 1 July 2013 | Javeria Khan; Nida Dar; Bismah Maroof; Batool Fatima; Qanita Jalil | Won | |
| 75 | Sadia Yousuf | 5 | 35 | 9 | 3.88 | 2 | Pakistan | Ireland | Claremont Road Cricket Ground, Dublin, Ireland | 19 July 2013 | Clare Shillington; Cecelia Joyce; Laura Delany; Louise McCarthy; Amy Kenealy | Won | |
| 76 | Dane van Niekerk † (2/2) | 5 | 17 | 6.4 | 2.55 | 1 | South Africa | Pakistan | West End Park International Cricket Stadium, Doha, Qatar | 15 January 2014 | Sana Mir; Bismah Maroof; Asmavia Iqbal; Qanita Jalil; Sumaiya Siddiqi | Won | |
| 77 | Holly Huddleston (1/3) | 5 | 36 | 10 | 3.60 | 2 | New Zealand | West Indies | Bert Sutcliffe Oval, Lincoln, New Zealand | 24 February 2014 | Merissa Aguilleira; Stacy-Ann King; Shemaine Campbelle; Shaquana Quintyne; Shanel Daley | Won | |
| 78 | Felicity Leydon-Davis | 5 | 18 | 8.2 | 2.16 | 2 | New Zealand | West Indies | Bert Sutcliffe Oval, Lincoln, New Zealand | 26 February 2014 | Natasha McLean; Shemaine Campbelle; Merissa Aguilleira; Vanessa Watts; Tremayne Smartt | Won | |
| 79 | Tremayne Smartt † | 5 | 24 | 10 | 2.40 | 1 | West Indies | New Zealand | Warner Park Stadium, Basseterre, Saint Kitts and Nevis | 12 September 2014 | Suzie Bates; Sara McGlashan; Sophie Devine; Rachel Priest; Lea Tahuhu | Won | |
| 80 | Shakera Selman † | 5 | 15 | 10 | 1.50 | 1 | West Indies | New Zealand | Warner Park Stadium, Basseterre, Saint Kitts and Nevis | 17 September 2014 | Samantha Curtis; Sara McGlashan; Amy Satterthwaite; Sophie Devine; Katie Perkins | Won | |
| 81 | Kate Cross † (1/3) | 5 | 24 | 10 | 2.40 | 1 | England | New Zealand | Bert Sutcliffe Oval, Lincoln, New Zealand | 26 February 2015 | Suzie Bates; Rachel Priest; Katie Perkins; Erin Bermingham; Sophie Devine | Won | |
| 82 | Suné Luus † (1/5) | 5 | 20 | 8.4 | 2.30 | 1 | South Africa | Pakistan | Sharjah Cricket Stadium, Sharjah, United Arab Emirates | 15 March 2015 | Nain Abidi; Asmavia Iqbal; Rabiya Shah; Sania Khan; Anam Amin | Won | |
| 83 | Morna Nielsen † (1/2) | 5 | 21 | 10 | 2.10 | 1 | New Zealand | Sri Lanka | Bert Sutcliffe Oval, Lincoln, New Zealand | 10 November 2015 | Nipuni Hansika; Chamari Atapattu; Sripali Weerakkody; Maduri Samuddika; Ama Kanchana | Won | |
| 84 | Deepti Sharma † (1/4) | 6 | 20 | 9.2 | 2.14 | 1 | India | Sri Lanka | JSCA International Stadium Complex, Ranchi, India | 19 February 2016 | Prasadani Weerakkody; Chamari Atapattu; Oshadi Ranasinghe; Shashikala Siriwardene; Udeshika Prabodhani; Sugandika Kumari | Won | |
| 85 | Jess Jonassen (1/2) | 5 | 50 | 9 | 5.55 | 1 | Australia | New Zealand | Bay Oval, Tauranga, New Zealand | 22 February 2016 | Suzie Bates; Sophie Devine; Katey Martin; Thamsyn Newton; Lea Tahuhu | Won | |
| 86 | Deandra Dottin † | 5 | 34 | 8.5 | 3.84 | 2 | West Indies | South Africa | Buffalo Park, East London, South Africa | 24 February 2016 | Trisha Chetty; Lizelle Lee; Dane van Niekerk; Suné Luus; Chloe Tryon | Won | |
| 87 | Heather Knight † | 5 | 26 | 8.4 | 3.00 | 1 | England | Pakistan | Grace Road, Leicester, England | 21 June 2016 (Note: Rain prevented any play taking place on 20 June, so the match was moved to the reserve day of 21 June.) | Iram Javed; Sidra Ameen; Sana Mir; Sania Khan; Asmavia Iqbal | Won | |
| 88 | Katherine Brunt (4/5) | 5 | 30 | 9.5 | 3.05 | 2 | England | Pakistan | County Ground, Taunton, England | 27 June 2016 | Nain Abidi; Sana Mir; Sadia Yousuf; Maham Tariq; Asmavia Iqbal | Won | |
| 89 | Suné Luus (2/5) | 6 | 36 | 10 | 3.60 | 2 | South Africa | Ireland | Anglesea Road Cricket Ground, Dublin, Ireland | 5 August 2016 | Catherine Dalton; Cecelia Joyce; Isobel Joyce; Laura Delany; Lucy O'Reilly; Louise McCarthy | Won | |
| 90 | Suné Luus (3/5) | 5 | 32 | 10 | 3.20 | 2 | South Africa | Ireland | Malahide Cricket Club Ground, Malahide, Ireland | 9 August 2016 | Gaby Lewis; Una Raymond-Hoey; Mary Waldron; Louise McCarthy; Ciara Metcalfe | Won | |
| 91 | Morna Nielsen (2/2) | 5 | 39 | 10 | 3.90 | 2 | New Zealand | South Africa | De Beers Diamond Oval, Kimberley, South Africa | 11 October 2016 | Lara Goodall; Lizelle Lee; Dane van Niekerk; Chloe Tryon; Marizanne Kapp | Lost | |
| 92 | Holly Huddleston † (2/3) | 5 | 25 | 10 | 2.50 | 1 | New Zealand | South Africa | De Beers Diamond Oval, Kimberley, South Africa | 13 October 2016 | Lara Goodall; Marizanne Kapp; Chloe Tryon; Ayabonga Khaka; Masabata Klaas | Won | |
| 93 | Thamsyn Newton † | 5 | 31 | 8 | 3.87 | 1 | New Zealand | Pakistan | Saxton Oval, Nelson, New Zealand | 19 November 2016 | Bismah Maroof; Javeria Khan; Nida Dar; Asmavia Iqbal; Sana Mir | Won | |
| 94 | Ekta Bisht † (1/2) | 5 | 8 | 10 | 0.80 | 1 | India | Pakistan | Paikiasothy Saravanamuttu Stadium, Colombo, Sri Lanka | 19 February 2017 | Ayesha Zafar; Nain Abidi; Sana Mir; Rabiya Shah; Sadia Yousuf | Won | |
| 95 | Holly Huddleston † (3/3) | 5 | 35 | 10 | 3.50 | 1 | New Zealand | Sri Lanka | Bristol County Ground, Bristol, England | 24 June 2017 | Chamari Polgampola; Prasadani Weerakkody; Sripali Weerakkody; Shashikala Siriwardene; Udeshika Prabodhani | Won | |
| 96 | Ekta Bisht † (2/2) | 5 | 18 | 10 | 1.80 | 2 | India | Pakistan | County Ground, Derby, England | 2 July 2017 | Ayesha Zafar; Sidra Nawaz; Iram Javed; Nashra Sandhu; Diana Baig | Won | |
| 97 | Suné Luus (4/5) | 5 | 67 | 10 | 6.70 | 1 | South Africa | Australia | County Ground, Taunton, England | 15 July 2017 | Nicole Bolton; Elyse Villani; Ellyse Perry; Alyssa Healy; Ashleigh Gardner | Lost | |
| 98 | Rajeshwari Gayakwad | 5 | 15 | 7.3 | 2.00 | 2 | India | New Zealand | County Ground, Derby, England | 15 July 2017 | Amy Satterthwaite; Sophie Devine; Hannah Rowe; Lea Tahuhu; Leigh Kasperek | Won | |
| 99 | Anya Shrubsole † (2/2) | 6 | 46 | 9.4 | 4.75 | 2 | England | India | Lord's, London, England | 23 July 2017 | Smriti Mandhana; Punam Raut; Veda Krishnamurthy; Jhulan Goswami; Deepti Sharma; Rajeshwari Gayakwad | Won | |
| 100 | Amelia Kerr (Note: No player of the match was awarded but Amelia Kerr was named player of the series.) (1/3) | 5 | 17 | 7 | 2.42 | 2 | New Zealand | Ireland | Castle Avenue, Dublin, Ireland | 13 June 2018 | Una Raymond-Hoey; Shauna Kavanagh; Amy Kenealy; Lara Maritz; Cara Murray | Won | |
| 101 | Leigh Kasperek (1/2) | 5 | 39 | 9.4 | 4.03 | 1 | New Zealand | England | Grace Road, Leicester, England | 13 July 2018 | Tammy Beaumont; Lauren Winfield; Katherine Brunt; Sophie Ecclestone; Laura Marsh | Won | |
| 102 | Khadija Tul Kubra † | 6 | 20 | 9.5 | 2.03 | 1 | Bangladesh | Pakistan | Sheikh Kamal International Stadium, Cox's Bazar, Bangladesh | 8 October 2018 | Ayesha Zafar; Nida Dar; Omaima Sohail; Javeria Khan; Sidra Nawaz; Nashra Sandhu | Won | |
| 103 | Jess Jonassen (2/2) | 5 | 27 | 8 | 3.37 | 2 | Australia | New Zealand | Karen Rolton Oval, Adelaide, Australia | 24 February 2019 | Sophie Devine; Katie Perkins; Anna Peterson; Amelia Kerr; Lea Tahuhu | Won | |
| 104 | Katherine Brunt † (5/5) | 5 | 28 | 10 | 2.80 | 1 | England | India | Wankhede Stadium, Mumbai, India | 28 February 2019 | Jemimah Rodrigues; Smriti Mandhana; Punam Raut; Mona Meshram; Mithali Raj | Won | |
| 105 | Delissa Kimmince † | 5 | 26 | 7.4 | 3.39 | 1 | Australia | England | Grace Road, Leicester, England | 4 July 2019 | Natalie Sciver; Katherine Brunt; Anya Shrubsole; Laura Marsh; Sophie Ecclestone | Won | |
| 106 | Ellyse Perry † (3/3) | 7 | 22 | 10 | 2.20 | 2 | Australia | England | St Lawrence Ground, Canterbury, England | 7 July 2019 | Amy Jones; Tammy Beaumont; Sarah Taylor; Heather Knight; Danielle Wyatt; Anya Shrubsole; Sophie Ecclestone | Won | |
| 107 | Anisa Mohammed (6/6) | 5 | 46 | 10 | 4.60 | 2 | West Indies | India | Sir Vivian Richards Stadium, Saint George Parish, Antigua and Barbuda | 1 November 2019 | Priya Punia; Mithali Raj; Deepti Sharma; Ekta Bisht; Poonam Yadav | Won | |
| 108 | Suné Luus † (5/5) | 6 | 45 | 10 | 4.50 | 1 | South Africa | New Zealand | Seddon Park, Hamilton, New Zealand | 30 January 2020 | Katie Perkins; Suzie Bates; Amelia Kerr; Hayley Jensen; Katey Martin; Jess Kerr | Won | |
| 109 | Leigh Kasperek (2/2) | 6 | 46 | 10 | 4.60 | 1 | New Zealand | Australia | Bay Oval, Tauranga, New Zealand | 7 April 2021 | Alyssa Healy; Rachael Haynes; Ashleigh Gardner; Ellyse Perry; Nicola Carey; Beth Mooney | Lost | |
| 110 | Kate Cross † (2/3) | 5 | 34 | 10 | 3.40 | 1 | England | India | County Ground, Taunton, England | 30 June 2021 | Smriti Mandhana; Jemimah Rodrigues; Harmanpreet Kaur; Deepti Sharma; Sneh Rana | Won | |
| 111 | Fatima Sana † | 5 | 39 | 7 | 5.57 | 2 | Pakistan | West Indies | Sir Vivian Richards Stadium, Saint George Parish, Antigua and Barbuda | 18 July 2021 | Deandra Dottin; Britney Cooper; Rashada Williams; Chinelle Henry; Anisa Mohammed | Won | |
| 112 | Lea Tahuhu | 5 | 37 | 10 | 3.70 | 1 | New Zealand | England | Grace Road, Leicester, England | 21 September 2021 | Tammy Beaumont; Lauren Winfield-Hill; Heather Knight; Sophia Dunkley; Charlie Dean | Won | |
| 113 | Anam Amin | 5 | 35 | 10 | 3.50 | 1 | Pakistan | West Indies | National Stadium, Karachi, Pakistan | 8 November 2021 | Rashada Williams; Deandra Dottin; Hayley Matthews; Kycia Knight; Shemaine Campbelle | Lost | |
| 114 | Nahida Akter † | 5 | 21 | 10 | 2.10 | 1 | Bangladesh | Zimbabwe | Queens Sports Club, Bulawayo, Zimbabwe | 15 November 2021 | Ashley Ndiraya; Mary-Anne Musonda; Christabel Chatonzwa; Josephine Nkomo; Tasmeen Granger | Won | |
| 115 | Ayabonga Khaka (1/2) | 5 | 26 | 8 | 3.25 | 2 | South Africa | West Indies | The Wanderers Stadium, Johannesburg, South Africa | 31 January 2022 | Kycia Knight; Deandra Dottin; Hayley Matthews; Chinelle Henry; Shamilia Connell | Tied | |
| 116 | Marizanne Kapp † (1/2) | 5 | 45 | 10 | 4.50 | 1 | South Africa | England | Bay Oval, Tauranga, New Zealand | 14 March 2022 | Danni Wyatt; Heather Knight; Katherine Brunt; Sophia Dunkley; Kate Cross | Won | |
| 117 | Hannah Rowe | 5 | 55 | 10 | 5.50 | 2 | New Zealand | Pakistan | Hagley Oval, Christchurch, New Zealand | 26 March 2022 | Bismah Maroof; Aliya Riaz; Nida Dar; Sidra Nawaz; Diana Baig | Won | |
| 118 | Sophie Ecclestone (1/2) | 6 | 36 | 8 | 4.50 | 2 | England | South Africa | Hagley Oval, Christchurch, New Zealand | 31 March 2022 | Marizanne Kapp; Chloe Tryon; Mignon du Preez; Shabnim Ismail; Masabata Klaas; Trisha Chetty | Won | |
| 119 | Shabnim Ismail † (2/2) | 5 | 8 | 8.5 | 0.90 | 2 | South Africa | Ireland | Castle Avenue, Dublin, Ireland | 17 June 2022 | Gaby Lewis; Rachel Delaney; Leah Paul; Shauna Kavanagh; Cara Murray | Won | |
| 120 | Cara Murray (1/2) | 5 | 39 | 10 | 3.90 | 2 | Ireland | Netherlands | VRA Ground, Amstelveen, Netherlands | 24 August 2022 | Juliët Post; Robine Rijke; Iris Zwilling; Frederique Overdijk; Eva Lynch | Won | |
| 121 | Ghulam Fatima † | 5 | 34 | 10 | 3.40 | 1 | Pakistan | Ireland | Gaddafi Stadium, Lahore, Pakistan | 9 November 2022 | Gaby Lewis; Amy Hunter; Orla Prendergast; Eimear Richardson; Laura Delany | Won | |
| 122 | Iris Zwilling | 5 | 25 | 9.4 | 2.58 | 1 | Netherlands | Thailand | Royal Chiangmai Golf Club, Mae Faek, Thailand | 24 November 2022 | Sornnarin Tippoch; Nannapat Koncharoenkai; Onnicha Kamchomphu; Nattaya Boochatham; Thipatcha Putthawong | Lost | |
| 123 | Kelis Ndhlovu | 5 | 22 | 9.0 | 2.44 | 1 | Zimbabwe | Thailand | Terdthai Cricket Ground, Bangkok, Thailand | 19 April 2023 | Chanida Sutthiruang; Rosenan Kanoh; Phannita Maya; Thipatcha Putthawong; Onnicha Kamchomphu | Lost | |
| 124 | Thipatcha Putthawong | 6 | 6 | 6.1 | 0.97 | 2 | Thailand | Zimbabwe | Terdthai Cricket Ground, Bangkok, Thailand | 19 April 2023 | Chipo Mugeri-Tiripano; Modester Mupachikwa; Mary-Anne Musonda; Josephine Nkomo; Loreen Tshuma; Nomvelo Sibanda | Won | |
| 125 | Oshadi Ranasinghe † | 5 | 34 | 6.0 | 5.66 | 2 | Sri Lanka | Bangladesh | Sinhalese Sports Club Ground, Colombo | 4 May 2023 | Shamima Sultana; Sobhana Mostary; Fargana Hoque; Ritu Moni; Sultana Khatun | Won | |
| 126 | Charlie Dean | 5 | 31 | 6.0 | 5.16 | 2 | England | Sri Lanka | Grace Road, Leicester | 14 September 2023 | Chamari Athapaththu; Hansima Karunaratne; Hasini Perera; Kavisha Dilhari; Udeshika Prabodhani | Won | |
| 127 | Hannah Rainey | 5 | 41 | 9.0 | 4.55 | 1 | Scotland | Ireland | Desert Springs Cricket Ground, Almería | 21 October 2023 | Gaby Lewis; Leah Paul; Rebecca Stokell; Ava Canning; Georgina Dempsey | Lost | |
| 128 | Deepti Sharma (2/4) | 5 | 38 | 10.0 | 3.80 | 1 | India | Australia | Wankhede Stadium, Mumbai | 30 December 2023 | Ellyse Perry; Beth Mooney; Tahlia McGrath; Georgia Wareham; Annabel Sutherland | Lost | |
| 129 | Cara Murray † (2/2) | 6 | 31 | 6.5 | 4.53 | 2 | Ireland | Zimbabwe | Harare Sports Club, Harare | 23 January 2024 | Mary-Anne Musonda; Kelis Ndhlovu; Loreen Tshuma; Precious Marange; Nyasha Gwanzura; Lindokuhle Mabhero | Won | |
| 130 | Sachini Nisansala † | 5 | 28 | 5.5 | 4.80 | 2 | Sri Lanka | West Indies | Mahinda Rajapaksa International Cricket Stadium, Hambantota | 21 June 2024 | Zaida James; Chinelle Henry; Afy Fletcher; Qiana Joseph; Aaliyah Alleyne | Won | |
| 131 | Sophie Ecclestone (2/2) | 5 | 25 | 9 | 2.77 | 1 | England | New Zealand | New Road, Worcester | 30 June 2024 | Sophie Devine; Brooke Halliday; Lauren Down; Izzy Gaze; Molly Penfold | Won | |
| 132 | Lauren Bell † | 5 | 37 | 9 | 4.11 | 1 | England | New Zealand | Bristol County Ground, Bristol | 3 July 2024 | Sophie Devine; Amelia Kerr; Brooke Halliday; Izzy Gaze; Lauren Down | Won | |
| 133 | Annemijn van Beuge | 5 | 37 | 9.5 | 3.76 | 1 | Netherlands | Papua New Guinea | VRA Cricket Ground, Amstelveen | 9 August 2024 | Brenda Tau; Lakshmi Rajadurai; Kevau Frank; Tanya Ruma; Isabel Toua | Won | |
| 134 | Kate Cross † (3/3) | 6 | 30 | 9.5 | 3.05 | 1 | England | Ireland | Stormont, Belfast | 7 September 2024 | Una Raymond-Hoey; Orla Prendergast; Arlene Kelly; Jane Maguire; Alice Tector; Aimee Maguire | Won | |
| 135 | Aimee Maguire † | 5 | 19 | 3.5 | 4.95 | 1 | Ireland | England | Stormont, Belfast | 11 September 2024 | Freya Kemp; Paige Scholfield; Kate Cross; Mady Villiers; Lauren Filer | Won | |
| 136 | Geetika Kodali † | 5 | 43 | 10 | 4.30 | 1 | United States | Zimbabwe | Harare Sports Club, Amstelveen | 23 October 2024 | Sharne Mayers; Chipo Mugeri-Tiripano; Runyararo Pasipanodya; Christabel Chatonzwa; Nomvelo Sibanda | Won | |
| 137 | Megan Schutt † | 5 | 19 | 6.2 | 3.00 | 1 | Australia | India | Allan Border Field, Brisbane | 5 December 2024 | Smriti Mandhana; Priya Punia; Richa Ghosh; Saima Thakor; Priya Mishra | Won | |
| 138 | Ashleigh Gardner | 5 | 30 | 10 | 3.00 | 2 | Australia | India | WACA Ground, Perth | 11 December 2024 | Smriti Mandhana; Deepti Sharma; Minnu Mani; Saima Thakor; Arundhati Reddy | Won | |
| 139 | Zaida James | 5 | 45 | 8 | 5.62 | 1 | West Indies | India | Baroda Cricket Association Stadium, Vadodara, India | 22 December 2024 | Smriti Mandhana; Jemimah Rodrigues; Saima Thakor; Titas Sadhu; Renuka Singh Thakur | Lost | |
| 140 | Renuka Singh Thakur † | 5 | 29 | 10 | 2.90 | 2 | India | West Indies | Baroda Cricket Association Stadium, Vadodara, India | 22 December 2024 | Hayley Matthews; Deandra Dottin; Aaliyah Alleyne; Shabika Gajnabi; Shemaine Campbelle | Won | |
| 141 | Deepti Sharma † (3/4) | 6 | 31 | 10 | 3.10 | 1 | India | West Indies | Baroda Cricket Association Stadium, Vadodara, India | 27 December 2024 | Shemaine Campbelle; Zaida James; Chinelle Henry; Aaliyah Alleyne; Afy Fletcher; Ashmini Munisar | Won | |
| 142 | Alana King (1/3) | 5 | 46 | 8.2 | 5.52 | 2 | Australia | England | Bellerive Oval, Hobart | 17 January 2025 | Danni Wyatt-Hodge; Amy Jones; Sophie Ecclestone; Lauren Filer; Charlie Dean | Won | |
| 143 | Fahima Khatun | 5 | 21 | 8.5 | 2.37 | 2 | Bangladesh | Thailand | Lahore City Cricket Association Ground, Lahore | 10 April 2025 | Chanida Sutthiruang; Nannapat Koncharoenkai; Nattaya Boochatham; Suleeporn Laomi; Onnicha Kamchomphu | Won | |
| 144 | Jannatul Ferdus | 5 | 7 | 5 | 1.40 | 2 | Bangladesh | Thailand | Lahore City Cricket Association Ground, Lahore | 10 April 2025 | Natthakan Chantham; Phannita Maya; Naruemol Chaiwai; Aphisara Suwanchonrathi; Sunida Chaturongrattana | Won | |
| 145 | Louise Little † | 5 | 28 | 9.1 | 3.05 | 2 | Ireland | Thailand | Lahore City Cricket Association Ground, Lahore | 15 April 2025 | Phannita Maya; Onnicha Kamchomphu; Thipatcha Putthawong; Sunida Chaturongrattana; Suwanan Khiaoto | Won | |
| 146 | Sneh Rana † | 5 | 43 | 10 | 4.30 | 2 | India | South Africa | R. Premadasa Stadium, Colombo | 29 April 2025 | Lara Goodall; Chloe Tryon; Nadine de Klerk; Annerie Dercksen; Tazmin Brits | Won | |
| 147 | Dewmi Vihanga | 5 | 43 | 9 | 4.77 | 1 | Sri Lanka | South Africa | R. Premadasa Stadium, Colombo | 9 May 2025 | Tazmin Brits; Laura Wolvaardt; Miane Smit; Lara Goodall; Sinalo Jafta | Lost | |
| 148 | Chloe Tryon † | 5 | 34 | 8 | 4.25 | 2 | South Africa | Sri Lanka | R. Premadasa Stadium, Colombo | 9 May 2025 | Hasini Perera; Vishmi Gunaratne; Dewmi Vihanga; Sugandika Kumari; Malki Madara | Won | |
| 149 | Linsey Smith | 5 | 36 | 10 | 3.60 | 2 | England | West Indies | County Ground, Derby, England | 30 May 2025 | Zaida James; Shemaine Campbelle; Mandy Mangru; Jahzara Claxton; Cherry-Ann Fraser | Won | |
| 150 | Kranti Goud | 6 | 52 | 9.5 | 5.28 | 2 | India | England | Riverside Ground, Chester-le-Street, England | 22 July 2025 | Tammy Beaumont; Amy Jones; Charlie Dean; Alice Davidson-Richards; Lauren Filer; Lauren Bell | Won | |
| 151 | Nashra Sandhu † | 6 | 26 | 9 | 2.88 | 1 | Pakistan | South Africa | Gaddafi Stadium, Lahore, Pakistan | 22 September 2025 | Suné Luus; Miané Smit; Sinalo Jafta; Anneke Bosch; Chloe Tryon; Nadine de Klerk | Won | |
| 152 | Annabel Sutherland | 5 | 40 | 9.5 | 4.06 | 1 | Australia | India | ACA–VDCA Cricket Stadium, Visakhapatnam, India | 12 October 2025 | Pratika Rawal; Richa Ghosh; Jemimah Rodrigues; Kranti Goud; Shree Charani | Won | |
| 153 | Suraksha Kotte † | 5 | 20 | 10 | 2.00 | 1 | United Arab Emirates | Papua New Guinea | Amini Park, Port Moresby, Papua New Guinea | 13 October 2025 | Brenda Tau; Henao Thomas; Erani Pokana; Hollan Doriga; Dika Lohia | Won | |
| 154 | Alana King † (2/3) | 7 | 18 | 7 | 2.57 | 1 | Australia | South Africa | Holkar Stadium, Indore, India | 25 October 2025 | Suné Luus; Marizanne Kapp; Annerie Dercksen; Chloe Tryon; Sinalo Jafta; Masabata Klaas; Nadine de Klerk | Won | |
| 155 | Marizanne Kapp (2/2) | 5 | 20 | 7 | 2.85 | 2 | South Africa | England | Assam Cricket Association Stadium, Guwahati, India | 29 October 2025 | Amy Jones; Heather Knight; Nat Sciver-Brunt; Sophia Dunkley; Charlie Dean | Won | |
| 156 | Deepti Sharma (4/4) | 5 | 39 | 9.3 | 4.10 | 2 | India | South Africa | DY Patil Stadium, Navi Mumbai, India | 2 November 2025 | Sinalo Jafta; Annerie Dercksen; Laura Wolvaardt; Chloe Tryon; Nadine de Klerk | Won | |
| 157 | Amelia Kerr † (2/3) | 7 | 34 | 9.1 | 3.70 | 1 | New Zealand | Zimbabwe | University of Otago Oval, Dunedin, New Zealand | 8 March 2026 | Chiedza Dhururu; Modester Mupachikwa; Christabel Chatonzwa; Adel Zimunu; Nyasha Gwanzura; Audrey Mazvishaya; Tendai Makusha | Won | |
| 158 | Amelia Kerr † (3/3) | 5 | 22 | 3.1 | 6.94 | 2 | New Zealand | Zimbabwe | University of Otago Oval, Dunedin, New Zealand | 11 March 2026 | Christabel Chatonzwa; Adel Zimunu; Audrey Mazvishaya; Tendai Makusha; Nomvelo Sibanda | Won | |
| 159 | Ayabonga Khaka † (2/2) | 6 | 56 | 10 | 5.60 | 1 | South Africa | New Zealand | Hagley Oval, Christchurch, New Zealand | 29 March 2026 | Amelia Kerr; Izzy Sharp; Maddy Green; Flora Devonshire; Rosemary Mair; Jess Kerr | Won | |
| 160 | Alana King † (3/3) | 5 | 19 | 10 | 1.90 | 1 | Australia | West Indies | Warner Park Sporting Complex, Basseterre, Saint Kitts and Nevis | 2 April 2026 | Hayley Matthews; Jannillea Glasgow; Realeanna Grimmond; Afy Fletcher; Karishma Ramharack | Won | |
| 161 | Rosemary Mair | 5 | 50 | 9.1 | 5.45 | 2 | New Zealand | South Africa | Basin Reserve, Wellington, New Zealand | 4 April 2026 | Tazmin Brits; Annerie Dercksen; Anneke Bosch; Chloe Tryon; Ayanda Hlubi | Won | |
| 162 | Issy Wong † | 5 | 33 | 10 | 3.30 | 1 | England | Ireland | County Ground, Derby, England | 3 September 2026 | Gaby Lewis; Leah Paul; Louise Little; Cara Murray; Amy Hunter | Won | |
| 163 | Vaishnavi Sharma † | 5 | 39 | 10 | 3.90 | 1 | India | Zimbabwe | Baroda Cricket Association Stadium, Vadodara, India | 28 October 2026 | Beloved Biza; Modester Mupachikwa; Chiedza Dhururu; Michelle Mavunga; Nyasha Gwanzura | Won | |
