= 2000 Women's Cricket World Cup squads =

Eight teams participated in the 2000 Women's Cricket World Cup in New Zealand, down from eleven at the previous edition in 1997.

== Australia ==
Player	Date of birth	Batting	Bowling style
Belinda Clark (c)	10 September 1970 (aged 30)	Right	Right-arm off-spin
Cherie Bambury	24 July 1976 (aged 24)	Left	Right-arm fast-medium
Joanne Broadbent	29 November 1965 (aged 35)	Left	Left-arm medium
Louise Broadfoot	26 February 1978 (aged 22)	Right	Right-arm leg-spin
Avril Fahey	24 June 1974 (aged 26)	Right	Right-arm off-spin
Cathryn Fitzpatrick	4 March 1968 (aged 32)	Right	Right-arm fast
Zoe Goss	6 December 1968 (aged 31)	Right	Right-arm medium-fast
Julie Hayes	2 May 1973 (aged 27)	Right	Right-arm fast
Lisa Keightley	26 August 1971 (aged 29)	Right	Right-arm medium
Olivia Magno	4 November 1972 (aged 28)	Right	Right-arm leg-spin
Charmaine Mason	20 September 1970 (aged 30)	Right	Right-arm fast
Terry McGregor	5 July 1977 (aged 23)	Right	Right-arm fast-medium
Julia Price (wk)	11 January 1972 (aged 28)	Right	—
Karen Rolton	21 November 1974 (aged 26)	Left	Left-arm medium

== England ==
Player	Date of birth	Batting	Bowling style
Clare Connor (c)	1 September 1976 (aged 24)	Right	—
Jane Cassar (wk)	24 December 1972 (aged 27)	Right	—
Sarah Collyer	3 October 1980 (aged 20)	Right	Right-arm medium
Barbara Daniels	17 December 1964 (aged 35)	Right	Right-arm medium
Charlotte Edwards	17 December 1979 (aged 20)	Right	Right-arm leg-spin
Laura Harper	22 January 1984 (aged 16)	Right	Right-arm off-spin
Dawn Holden	1 September 1980 (aged 20)	Right	Left-arm orthodox
Kathryn Leng	28 September 1973 (aged 27)	Left	Right-arm leg-spin
Lucy Pearson	19 February 1972 (aged 28)	Right	Left-arm fast
Melissa Reynard	14 March 1972 (aged 28)	Right	Left-arm medium
Nicky Shaw	30 December 1981 (aged 18)	Right	Right-arm fast-medium
Claire Taylor (wk)	25 September 1975 (aged 25)	Right	—
Clare Taylor	22 May 1965 (aged 35)	Right	Right-arm medium
Arran Thompson	23 November 1981 (aged 19)	Right	Right-arm medium

== India ==
Player	Date of birth	Batting	Bowling style
Anju Jain (c, wk)	11 August 1974 (aged 26)	Right	—
Anjum Chopra	20 May 1977 (aged 23)	Left	Right-arm medium
Neetu David	1 September 1977 (aged 23)	Right	Left-arm orthodox
Kalyani Dhokarikar	9 May 1971 (aged 29)	Right	Right-arm medium-fast
Smitha Harikrishna	6 October 1973 (aged 27)	Right	Right-arm medium
Hemlata Kala	15 August 1975 (aged 25)	Right	Right-arm medium
Chanderkanta Kaul	21 January 1971 (aged 29)	Right	—
Arundhati Kirkire (wk)	31 May 1980 (aged 20)	Right	Right-arm medium
Deepa Marathe	25 November 1972 (aged 28)	Right	Left-arm orthodox
Renu Margrate	3 July 1975 (aged 25)	Right	Right-arm medium
Mithali Raj	3 December 1982 (aged 17)	Right	Right-arm leg-spin
Purnima Rau	30 January 1967 (aged 33)	Right	Right-arm off-spin
Kavita Roy	22 June 1980 (aged 20)	Right	Right-arm medium
Rupanjali Shastri	14 November 1975 (aged 25)	Right	Right-arm off-spin
Sunita Singh	22 February 1974 (aged 26)	Right	Right-arm medium

== Ireland ==
Coach: (Ireland) John Wills

Player	Date of birth	Batting	Bowling style
Miriam Grealey (c)	27 December 1965 (aged 34)	Right	Right-arm off-spin
Caitriona Beggs	15 July 1977 (aged 23)	Right	Right-arm medium
Sandra Dawson (wk)	30 October 1962 (aged 38)	Right	—
Isobel Joyce	25 July 1983 (aged 17)	Right	Left-arm medium
Anne Linehan	7 October 1973 (aged 27)	Left	Right-arm medium
Barbara McDonald	28 May 1972 (aged 28)	Right	Right-arm medium-fast
Ciara Metcalfe	29 September 1979 (aged 21)	Left	Right-arm leg-spin
Lara Molins	28 March 1980 (aged 20)	Right	Right-arm medium
Clare O'Leary	2 June 1967 (aged 33)	Right	—
Catherine O'Neill	28 June 1970 (aged 30)	Right	Right-arm off-spin
Cliodhna Sharp	3 June 1976 (aged 24)	Right	—
Clare Shillington	8 January 1981 (aged 19)	Right	Right-arm off-spin
Nikki Squire	2 November 1967 (aged 33)	Right	—
Karen Young	6 June 1968 (aged 32)	Right	Right-arm medium
Saibh Young	5 September 1967 (aged 33)	Right	Right-arm medium

== Netherlands ==
Coach: (New Zealand) Greg Curtain

Player	Date of birth	Batting	Bowling style
Pauline te Beest (c)	13 February 1970 (aged 30)	Right	—
Teuntje de Boer	31 May 1968 (aged 32)	Right	Right-arm medium
Carolien de Fouw	12 May 1966 (aged 34)	Right	Right-arm off-spin
Iris Jharap	1 May 1970 (aged 30)	Right	Right-arm fast-medium
Leonie Hoitink	20 January 1973 (aged 27)	Right	Right-arm medium
Jiska Howard	6 September 1971 (aged 29)	Right	—
Maartje Köster	3 March 1975 (aged 25)	Right	Right-arm medium
Sandra Kottman	20 May 1967 (aged 33)	Left	Left-arm medium
Rowan Milburn (wk)	18 June 1977 (aged 23)	Right	—
Cheraldine Oudolf	4 May 1980 (aged 20)	Right	Right-arm medium-fast
Helmien Rambaldo	13 November 1980 (aged 20)	Right	Right-arm medium
Elise Reynolds	25 March 1969 (aged 31)	Right	Right-arm fast-medium
Carolien Salomons	20 July 1974 (aged 26)	Right	Right-arm off-spin
Tessa van der Gun	24 July 1982 (aged 18)	Right	Right-arm off-spin
Carly Verheul	12 January 1980 (aged 20)	Right	—

== New Zealand ==
Kate Pulford was originally named in the squad, but pulled out due to illness. She was replaced by Nicola Payne.

Player	Date of birth	Batting	Bowling style
Emily Drumm (c)	15 September 1974 (aged 26)	Right	Right-arm medium
Catherine Campbell	20 July 1963 (aged 37)	Left	Right-arm off-spin
Paula Flannery	27 May 1974 (aged 26)	Right	Right-arm off-spin
Debbie Hockley	7 November 1962 (aged 38)	Right	Right-arm medium
Katrina Keenan	24 February 1971 (aged 29)	Right	Right-arm medium-fast
Erin McDonald	25 November 1980 (aged 20)	Right	Left-arm orthodox
Clare Nicholson	20 September 1967 (aged 33)	Right	Right-arm off-spin
Nicola Payne	10 September 1969 (aged 31)	Right	Right-arm medium
Rachel Pullar	3 June 1977 (aged 23)	Right	Right-arm fast-medium
Kathryn Ramel	7 September 1973 (aged 27)	Right	Right-arm medium
Rebecca Rolls (wk)	22 August 1975 (aged 25)	Right	—
Anna Smith	12 May 1978 (aged 22)	Right	—
Haidee Tiffen	4 September 1979 (aged 21)	Right	Right-arm medium
Emily Travers (wk)	29 July 1978 (aged 22)	Right	—
Helen Watson	17 February 1972 (aged 28)	Right	Right-arm medium

== South Africa ==
Kerri Laing was originally named in the squad, but withdrew and was replaced by Hanri Strydom.

Coach: (South Africa) Rodney Willemburg

Player	Date of birth	Batting	Bowling style
Kim Price (c)	9 December 1962 (aged 37)	Right	Left-arm orthodox
Anina Burger	25 August 1967 (aged 33)	Right	—
Helen Davies	29 July 1966 (aged 34)	Right	Right-arm medium
Cindy Eksteen	21 November 1977 (aged 23)	Right	Right-arm fast-medium
Alison Hodgkinson	30 January 1977 (aged 23)	Right	Right-arm leg-spin
Ally Kuylaars	17 May 1971 (aged 29)	Right	Right-arm fast
Levona Lewis	15 November 1972 (aged 28)	Left	Left-arm fast-medium
Nolu Ndzundzu	21 December 1977 (aged 22)	Right	Right-arm medium
Linda Olivier	17 April 1965 (aged 35)	Right	Right-arm medium
Denise Reid	15 June 1967 (aged 33)	Left	Right-arm fast-medium
Hanri Strydom	7 November 1980 (aged 20)	Right	Right-arm medium
Daleen Terblanche (wk)	19 October 1969 (aged 31)	Right	—
Yulandi van der Merwe	19 December 1977 (aged 22)	Right	Right-arm medium-fast
Sune van Zyl	16 July 1977 (aged 23)	Right	Right-arm fast-medium
Sunette Viljoen	10 June 1983 (aged 17)	Right	Right-arm medium

== Sri Lanka ==
Coach: (Sri Lanka) Guy de Alwis

Player	Date of birth	Batting	Bowling style
Rasanjali Silva (c)	26 November 1971 (aged 29)	Left	Right-arm fast-medium
Hiroshi Abeysinghe	2 November 1978 (aged 22)	Right	Right-arm off-spin
Thanuga Ekanayake (wk)	24 February 1972 (aged 28)	Right	—
Hiruka Fernando	30 September 1976 (aged 24)	Left	Left-arm orthodox
Dona Indralatha	27 August 1973 (aged 27)	Right	Right-arm fast-medium
Indika Kankanange	25 September 1974 (aged 26)	Right	Right-arm fast-medium
Chandrika Lakmalee	27 October 1978 (aged 22)	Right	Right-arm leg-spin
Kalpana Liyanarachchi	4 June 1973 (aged 27)	Right	Right-arm medium
Janakanthy Mala	30 August 1968 (aged 32)	Right	Right-arm off-spin
Ramani Perera	29 August 1976 (aged 24)	Right	Right-arm leg-spin
Chamani Seneviratna	14 November 1978 (aged 22)	Right	Right-arm medium
Dedunu Silva	12 February 1978 (aged 22)	Right	Right-arm medium
Suthershini Sivanantham	20 December 1972 (aged 27)	Right	Right-arm off-spin
Champa Sugathadasa	10 November 1973 (aged 27)	Right	Right-arm medium
