= Netherlands women's cricket team in Sri Lanka in 1998–99 =

	Sri Lanka	Netherlands
- Dates: 21 – 30 March 1999
Captains	Rasanjali Silva	Pauline te Beest

One Day International series
- Results: Sri Lanka won the 5-match series 5–0
Most runs	Hiruka Fernando (161)	Jiska Howard (102)
Most wickets	Ramani Perera (12)	Carolien Salomons (4); Caroline Rambaldo (4)

The Netherlands women's national cricket team toured Sri Lanka in March 1999. They failed to win a single match in the five-match One Day International series against Sri Lanka, losing the series 5–0.

== Squads ==
Sri Lanka	Netherlands
Rasanjali Silva (c); Vanessa Bowen; Thanuga Ekanayake (wk); Hiruka Fernando; Rose Fernando; Chandrika Lakmalee; Kalpana Liyanarachchi; Gayathri Kariyawasam; Ramani Perera; Chamani Seneviratna; Suthershini Sivanantham; Champa Sugathadasa; Chaturi Thalagalage	Pauline te Beest (c) (wk); Teuntje de Boer; Martika Flieringa (wk); Jolet Hartenhof; Leonie Hoitink; Jiska Howard; Iris Jharap; Maartje Köster; Sandra Kottman; Caroline Rambaldo; Carolien Salomons; Annemarie Tanke; Eugenie van Leeuwen; Carly Verheul

== WODI Series ==
=== 1st ODI ===
21 March 1999
Scorecard

Netherlands; 84 (46.4 overs)	v	Sri Lanka; 88/3 (21.5 overs)
Jiska Howard 18 (–); Rasanjali Silva 3/13 (9 overs)		Hiruka Fernando 23 (–); Caroline Rambaldo 2/24 (5.5 overs)

Sri Lanka Women won by 7 wickets
St Thomas College Ground, Moratuwa
Umpires: Nandasena Pathirana (SL) and Ron de Bouter (Net)

- Sri Lanka Women won the toss and elected to field.
- Teuntje de Boer, Martika Flieringa, Leonie Hoitink (Net) and Champa Sugathadasa (SL) all made their WODI debuts.

=== 2nd ODI ===
23 March 1999
Scorecard

Sri Lanka; 229/5 (46 overs)	v	Netherlands; 152/8 (46 overs)
Vanessa Bowen 45 (–); Maartje Köster 1/16 (4 overs)		Jiska Howard 66 (–); Ramani Perera 2/42 (10 overs)

Sri Lanka Women won by 77 runs
Singhalese Sports Club Cricket Ground, Colombo
Umpires: Gamini Dissanayake (SL) and Ron de Bouter (Net)

- Sri Lanka Women won the toss and elected to bat.
- Match reduced to 46 overs per side due to rain.

=== 3rd ODI ===
25 March 1999
Scorecard

Netherlands; 93/7 (50 overs)	v	Sri Lanka; 95/1 (28.1 overs)
Leonie Hoitink 16 (–); Chamani Seneviratna 2/11 (8 overs)		Hiruka Fernando 41* (–); Caroline Rambaldo 1/19 (7.1 overs)

Sri Lanka Women won by 9 wickets
De Soysa Stadium, Moratuwa
Umpires: Ranmore Martinesz (SL) and Ron de Bouter (Net)

- Sri Lanka Women won the toss and elected to field.
- Iris Jharap and Carly Verheul (Net) both made their WODI debuts.

=== 4th ODI ===
29 March 1999
Scorecard

Sri Lanka; 240/8 (50 overs)	v	Netherlands; 145/8 (50 overs)
Chaturi Thalagalage 68 (–); Carolien Salomons 3/27 (10 overs)		Pauline te Beest 57 (–); Ramani Perera 4/32 (10 overs)

Sri Lanka Women won by 95 runs
R. Premadasa Stadium, Colombo
Umpires: PU Ariyawansa (SL) and Ron de Bouter (Net)

- Sri Lanka Women won the toss and elected to bat.
- Eugenie van Leeuwen (Net) made her WODI debut.

=== 5th ODI ===
30 March 1999
Scorecard

Netherlands; 162/6 (50 overs)	v	Sri Lanka; 163/3 (41.5 overs)
Maartje Köster 58* (–); Ramani Perera 3/39 (10 overs)		Hiruka Fernando 65* (–); Iris Jharap 1/20 (4 overs)

Sri Lanka Women won by 7 wickets
R. Premadasa Stadium, Colombo
Umpires: Gamini Dissanayake (SL) and Ron de Bouter (Net)

- Netherlands Women won the toss and elected to bat.
