= Netherlands women's cricket team against Denmark in Germany in 1998 =

	Denmark	Netherlands
- Dates: 25 – 26 July 1998
Captains	Janni Jonsson	Pauline te Beest

One Day International series
- Results: 2-match series drawn 1–1
Most runs	Mette Frost (52)	Pauline te Beest (43)
Most wickets	Mette Gregersen (5)	Carolien Salomons (4)

The Netherlands women's national cricket team played Denmark in Germany in a two-match One Day International series in July 1998. The series was drawn with the two sides winning one match apiece.

== Squads ==
Denmark	Netherlands
Janni Jonsson (c); Malene Brock; Eva Christensen; Mette Frost; Mette Gregersen; Henriette Hansen; Malene Iversen (wk); Karin Mikkelsen; Inger Nielsen; Susanne Nielsen; Vibeke Nielsen; Heidi Pico	Pauline te Beest (c); Jolet Hartenhof; Jiska Howard; Maartje Köster; Sandra Kottman; Cheraldine Oudolf; Nicola Payne; Caroline Rambaldo; Helmien Rambaldo; Elise Reynolds; Carolien Salomons; Maaike Schroeder (wk); Andrea van de Broeke

== WODI Series ==
=== 1st ODI ===
25 July 1998
Scorecard

Netherlands; 112 (50 overs)	v	Denmark; 78 (47.3 overs)
Pauline te Beest 34 (–); Mette Gregersen 3/14 (10 overs)		Janni Jonsson 32 (–); Carolien Salomons 3/11 (6.3 overs)

Netherlands Women won by 34 runs
Mikkelberg-Kunst-und-Cricket Center, Hattstedt

- Denmark Women won the toss and elected to field.
- Heidi Pico (Den) and Helmien Rambaldo (Net) both made their WODI debuts.

=== 2nd ODI ===
26 July 1998
Scorecard

Denmark; 137/5 (50 overs)	v	Netherlands; 75 (42.3 overs)
Mette Frost 50 (–); Cheraldine Oudolf 2/26 (10 overs)		Nicola Payne 11 (–); Janni Jonsson 2/10 (10 overs)

Denmark Women won by 62 runs
Mikkelberg-Kunst-und-Cricket Center, Hattstedt

- Denmark Women won the toss and elected to bat.
- Eva Christensen (Den), Jolet Hartenhof and Andrea van de Broeke (Net) all made their WODI debuts.
