= Netherlands women's cricket team against Denmark in Germany in 1997 =

Denmark and the Netherlands played a two-match Women's One Day International cricket series in July 1997. Netherlands won the series 2–0. The series was hosted in Germany. Both matches were played at the Mikkelberg-Kunst-und-Cricket Center, in Hattstedt.

== Series ==
5 Jul 1997
Scorecard

Netherlands; 150/6 (50 Overs)	v	Denmark; 124 (46.5 Overs)
Edmee Janss 47; Susanne Nielsen 4/18 (10 Overs)		Dorte Christiansen 29; Caroline de Fouw 2/20 (5.5 Overs)

Neth Women won by 26 runs
Mikkelberg-Kunst-und-Cricket Center
Umpires: Hans Jensen and Eddie Wright

- Malene Brock, Muriel Grunsing and Elise Reynolds made their ODI Debut

6 Jul 1997
Scorecard

Denmark; 146/8 (50 Overs)	v	Netherlands; 147/0 (38.1 Overs)
Karin Mikkelsen 42*; Nicola Payne 3/25 (10 Overs)		Nicola Payne 73

Neth Women won by 10 wickets (with 71 balls remaining)
Mikkelberg-Kunst-und-Cricket Center
Umpires: Hans Jensen and Eddie Wright

- Caroline Rambaldo, Annemarie Tanke and Inger Nielsen made their ODI Debut
