= Rambaldo =

Rambaldo is a surname. Notable people with the surname include:

- Caroline Rambaldo (born 1971), Dutch cricketer
- Helmien Rambaldo (born 1980), Dutch cricketer
- Laudadio Rambaldo, 14th-century Italian painter

== See also ==
- 9683 Rambaldo, a minor planet
