= South Africa women's cricket team in the Netherlands in 2007 =

South African women's cricket team in Netherlands in 2007
	Netherlands	South Africa
- Dates: 28 July 2007 – 5 August 2007
Captains	Helmien Rambaldo	Cri-Zelda Brits

Test series
- Result: South Africa won the 1-match series 1–0
Most runs	Violet Wattenberg – 52	Daleen Terblanche – 83
Most wickets	Jolet Hartenhof – 4	Sunette Loubser – 8

One Day International series
- Results: South Africa won the 3-match series 3–0
Most runs	Helmien Rambaldo – 60	Johmari Logtenberg – 196
Most wickets	Lotte Egging – 3 Mandy Kornet – 3 Marijn Nijman – 3	Johmari Logtenberg – 5

The South Africa national women's cricket team toured the Netherlands in 2007, playing one Test match and three women's One Day Internationals.

== Test series ==
=== Only Test ===
28–31 July 2007
Scorecard

South Africa	v	Netherlands
232 (87 overs); Daleen Terblanche 83 (203); Jolet Hartenhof 4/62 (24 overs)		108 (123.3 overs); Violet Wattenberg 49 (378); Sunette Loubser 5/37 (40.3 overs)
85/2 dec. (21.3 overs); Susan Benade 51 (64); Marloes Braat 2/11 (2.3 overs)		50 (40 overs); Helmien Rambaldo 17 (49); Sunette Loubser 3/22 (14 overs)

South African won by 159 runs
Hazelaarweg Stadion
Umpires: Ingeborg Bevers and Steve Tovey

- Netherlands won the toss and elected to field.

== One Day International series ==
=== 1st ODI ===
2 August 2007
Scorecard

South Africa; 239/6 (50 overs)	v	Netherlands; 140/9 (50 overs)
Cri-Zelda Brits 46 (69); Lotte Egging 2/51 (10 overs)		Helmien Rambaldo 34 (69); Susan Benade 2/23 (7 overs)

South Africa won by 99 runs
VRA Cricket Ground, Amstelveen
Umpires: Ingeborg Bevers and Bart Hartong

- South Africa won the toss and elected to bat.

=== 2nd ODI ===
4 August 2007
Scorecard

South Africa; 262/4 (50 overs)	v	Netherlands; 88 (48.5 overs)
Daleen Terblanche 114* (148); Annemarie Tanke 1/16 (4 overs)		Carlijn de Groot 19 (51); Johmari Logtenberg 3/6 (4.5 overs)

South Africa won by 174 runs
Kampong, Utrecht
Umpires: Willem Molenaar and Erno Ruchtie

- Netherlands won the toss and elected to field.

=== 3rd ODI ===
5 August 2007
Scorecard

South Africa; 280/3 (50 overs)	v	Netherlands; 81 (35.4 overs)
Johmari Logtenberg 153* (160); Mandy Kornet 2/70 (10 overs)		Marijn Nijman 29* (61); Johmari Logtenberg 2/1 (0.4 overs)

South Africa won by 199 runs
Sportpark Het Schootsveld, Deventer
Umpires: Bart Hartong and Willem Molenaar

- Netherlands won the toss and elected to field.
