= Mandy Kornet =

Dutch cricketer (born 1985)

Personal information
- Born: 3 February 1985 (age 41); Rotterdam, Netherlands
- Batting: Right-handed
- Bowling: Right-arm medium
- Role: Bowler
- Relatives: Mariska Kornet (sister)

International information
- National side: Netherlands (2001–2009)
- Only Test (cap 6): 28 July 2007 v South Africa
- ODI debut (cap 61): 11 August 2001 v England
- Last ODI: 5 August 2009 v Ireland
- T20I debut (cap 12): 6 July 2008 v West Indies
- Last T20I: 6 August 2009 v Ireland

Career statistics
Competition	WTest	WODI	WT20I	WLA
Matches	1	15	2	24
Runs scored	11	16	1	57
Batting average	5.50	1.33	0.50	3.16
100s/50s	0/0	0/0	0/0	0/0
Top score	6	8*	1	15
Balls bowled	90	696	48	1,046
Wickets	1	12	2	24
Bowling average	50.00	40.83	18.50	26.50
5 wickets in innings	0	0	0	0
10 wickets in match	0	0	0	0
Best bowling	1/37	3/10	1/17	3/10
Catches/stumpings	0/–	3/–	0/–	6/–
- Source: CricketArchive, 2 December 2021

Mandy Kornet (born 3 February 1985) is a Dutch former cricketer who played as a right-arm medium bowler. She appeared in one Test match, 15 One Day Internationals and two Twenty20 Internationals for the Netherlands between 2001 and 2009. She is the older sister of Mariska Kornet, who has also represented the Netherlands at cricket.

Kornet made her One Day International (ODI) debut aged 16, against England in August 2001. At the time of her debut, only Cheraldine Oudolf had debuted at a younger age for the Netherlands. Against Japan at the 2003 IWCC Trophy, Kornet took what were to be the best figures of her ODI career, 3/10 from 10 overs. However, after that tournament, she did not again appear for the Netherlands until 2007, when she played three ODIs and a single Test against the touring South Africans. The Test match was the first and only match played by the Netherlands at that level.

In July 2008, Kornet made her Twenty20 International debut, taking 1/20 against the West Indies. The following year, at the 2009 European Championship, the regular Dutch captain, Helmien Rambaldo, was unable to play, and Kornet was appointed captain in her place. The tournament had both 50-over and 20-over components, and the Netherlands won its matches against Scotland in both of those formats. However, the team did not win either of its games against Ireland, leaving Kornet without a win as captain in ODIs or T20Is. Kornet missed the 2010 season after falling pregnant, and did not return to the team after giving birth, meaning her two matches as captain were her last at international level.
