= Leonie Hoitink =

Dutch cricketer

Personal information
- Full name: Leonie Martine Hoitink
- Born: 20 January 1973 (age 53); Enschede, Netherlands
- Batting: Right-handed
- Bowling: Right-arm medium
- Role: Batter

International information
- National side: Netherlands (1999–2008)
- Only Test (cap 5): 28 July 2007 v South Africa
- ODI debut (cap 49): 21 March 1999 v Sri Lanka
- Last ODI: 24 February 2008 v Ireland

Career statistics
Competition	WTest	WODI	WLA
Matches	1	14	18
Runs scored	1	92	175
Batting average	0.50	6.57	10.29
100s/50s	0/0	0/0	0/0
Top score	1	18	34*
Catches/stumpings	0/–	0/–	0/–
- Source: CricketArchive, 3 December 2021

Leonie Martine Hoitink (born 20 January 1973) is a Dutch former cricketer who played as a right-handed batter. She appeared in one Test match and 14 One Day Internationals for the Netherlands between 1999 and 2008, including playing at the 2000 World Cup and in the Netherlands' inaugural Test match.

Hoitink was born in Enschede, Overijssel, and played club cricket for KZKC (Klein Zwitserland de Krekels Combinatie) and VOC Rotterdam. Her senior debut for the Netherlands came in March 1999, when she was selected in the squad for an ODI tour of Sri Lanka. The following year, Hoitink was selected for the World Cup in New Zealand, and played in three of a possible seven matches. She had little success, however, scoring only nine runs overall. Hoitink did not appear again at ODI level until August 2006, when the Netherlands toured Ireland. In the second ODI, she opened the batting with Cheraldine Oudolf, and made what was to be her highest ODI score, 18 runs from 35 balls. In July and August 2007, South Africa went on a tour of the Netherlands, playing three ODIs and a Test – the first (and so far only) Test match played by any Dutch team, men or women. Selected in the Test squad, Hoitink scored only a single run across her two innings, and did not bowl. Her final ODIs came the following year, at the 2008 World Cup Qualifier. Hoitink finished with an ODI career batting average of only 6.57.
