= Muriel Grunsing =

Dutch cricketer

Muriel Gunsing
Personal information
- Born: unknown

International information
- National side: Netherlands
- ODI debut (cap 38): 5 July 1997 v Denmark
- Last ODI: 6 July 1997 v Denmark

Career statistics
Competition	WODI
Matches	2
Runs scored	4
Batting average	-
100s/50s	0/0
Top score	4*
Balls bowled	36
Wickets	-
Bowling average	-
5 wickets in innings	-
10 wickets in match	-
Best bowling	-
Catches/stumpings	2/0
- Source: Cricinfo, 26 December 2017

Muriel Gunsing is a former Dutch cricketer. She made her international debut against Denmark cricket team in 1997. She has played for Dutch cricket team in 2 Women's ODIs.
