= Iris Jharap =

Dutch cricketer

Personal information
- Full name: Iris Widiawatie Jharap
- Born: 1 May 1970 (age 56); Paramaribo, Suriname
- Batting: Right-handed
- Bowling: Right-arm fast-medium
- Role: Bowler

International information
- National side: Netherlands
- ODI debut (cap 50): 25 March 1999 v Sri Lanka
- Last ODI: 21 April 2001 v Pakistan

Career statistics
Competition	WODI
Matches	12
Runs scored	7
Batting average	3.50
100s/50s	0/0
Top score	4
Balls bowled	302
Wickets	6
Bowling average	31.00
5 wickets in innings	0
10 wickets in match	0
Best bowling	1/2
Catches/stumpings	2/–
- Source: CricketArchive, 1 December 2014

Iris Widiawatie Jharap (born 1 May 1970) is a former Dutch cricketer who played twelve One Day Internationals (ODIs) for the Dutch national side, including at the 2000 World Cup.

Born in Paramaribo, Suriname, Jharap played club cricket for De Kieviten, Groen-Greel, KZKC (Klein Zwitserland de Krekels Combinatie) and HV & CV Quick before making her ODI debut for the Netherlands in March 1999. Her debut came during the Dutch side's tour of Sri Lanka, in the third ODI played against the Sri Lankan national side. A right-arm fast bowler, her first wicket came in her second match, the fifth and final ODI, when she had Sri Lanka's captain, Rasanjali Silva, caught by Carolien Salomons.

Jharap was subsequently chosen for the Dutch squad at the 2000 World Cup, hosted by New Zealand. She played in four of the Netherlands' seven matches at the tournament, with the Dutch team going winless. Against South Africa, she bowled only 1.2 overs, but took 1/2, her best figures at international level, having Hanri Strydom stumped by Rowan Milburn. Jharap's remaining matches for the Netherlands came in a seven-ODI series against Pakistan during the 2000–01 season. She played in all but the fourth game of the series, and took four wickets at an average of 26.00. Her economy rate of 3.35 runs per over ranked behind only Carolien Salomons and Helmien Rambaldo for the Dutch.
