= Teuntje =

Teuntje is a Dutch given name that is a diminutive form of the feminine names Antonia and Antoinette and masculine names Antonius, Anton, Antoon and Anthonis used in Netherlands, Suriname, South Africa, Namibia, Belgium and Indonesia. Notable people with this name include the following individuals:

- Teuntje Beekhuis (born 1995), Dutch cyclist
- Teuntje de Boer (born 1968), Dutch cricketer
