= Mariska Kornet =

Dutch international cricketer (born 1988)

Personal information
- Born: 4 March 1988 (age 38); Rotterdam, Netherlands
- Batting: Right-handed
- Bowling: Right-arm medium-fast
- Role: Bowler
- Relatives: Mandy Kornet (sister)

International information
- National side: Netherlands (2010–2018)
- ODI debut (cap 79): 11 August 2010 v Ireland
- Last ODI: 24 November 2011 v Ireland
- T20I debut (cap 20): 14 October 2010 v South Africa
- Last T20I: 14 July 2018 v UAE

Career statistics
Competition	WODI	WT20I
Matches	10	3
Runs scored	18	1
Batting average	2.57	–
100s/50s	0/0	0/0
Top score	7	1*
Balls bowled	277	72
Wickets	5	1
Bowling average	53.80	110.00
5 wickets in innings	0	0
10 wickets in match	0	0
Best bowling	2/61	1/31
Catches/stumpings	4/–	0/–
- Source: ESPNCricinfo, 14 July 2018

Mariska Kornet (born 4 March 1988) is a Dutch international cricketer who plays for the Dutch national side.

Kornet made her international debut for the Netherlands at the 2010 edition of the European Championship, with her matches at the tournament including a One Day International (ODI) match against Ireland. Later in the year, she was selected in the Dutch squad for the 2010 ICC Women's Challenge in South Africa, where she played in a further five ODIs as well as three Twenty20 International fixtures. Kornet's last ODIs before the Netherlands lost its ODI status came at the 2011 World Cup Qualifier in Bangladesh, where she played in four of her team's matches. Her final international appearances came at the 2013 World Twenty20 Qualifier. Kornet is the younger sister of Mandy Kornet, who has also played internationally for the Netherlands, with both sisters being born in Rotterdam.

In June 2018, she was named in the Netherlands' squad for the 2018 ICC Women's World Twenty20 Qualifier tournament.
