= Martika Flieringa =

Dutch cricketer (born 1978)

Personal information
- Full name: Martika Flieringa
- Born: 17 November 1978 (age 47); Haarlem, Netherlands
- Batting: Right-handed
- Role: Wicket-keeper

International information
- National side: Netherlands (1999)
- ODI debut (cap 48): 21 March 1999 v Sri Lanka
- Last ODI: 30 March 1999 v Sri Lanka

Career statistics
Competition	WODI
Matches	4
Runs scored	8
Batting average	–
100s/50s	0/0
Top score	5*
Catches/stumpings	0/0
- Source: ESPNcricinfo, 14 December 2022

Martika Flieringa (born 17 November 1978) is a Dutch former cricketer who played as a wicket-keeper and right-handed batter. She appeared for Netherlands in four One Day Internationals, all on their 1998–99 tour of Sri Lanka. She scored eight runs as Netherlands failed to win any matches.
