= List of Netherlands women Test cricketers =

This is a list of Netherlands women Test cricketers. A Test match is an international cricket match between two of the leading cricketing nations. This list contains every women to have played Test cricket for Netherlands. Their only Test was in 2007 against South Africa. The players are listed alphabetically by the surname the player was using at the time of the match.

== Key ==
General

- ‡ – Captain
- † – Wicket-keeper
- First – Year of debut
- Last – Year of latest game
- Mat – Number of matches played
- Win% – Winning percentage

Batting

- Inn – Number of innings batted
- NO – Number of innings not dismissed
- Runs – Runs scored in career
- HS – Highest score
- 100 – Centuries scored
- 50 – Half-centuries scored
- Avg – Runs scored per dismissal
- * – Batsman remained not out

Bowling

- Balls – Balls bowled in career
- Wkt – Wickets taken in career
- BBI – Best bowling in an innings
- BBM – Best bowling in a match
- Ave – Average runs per wicket

Fielding

- Ca – Catches taken
- St – Stumpings effected

== Test cricketers ==
Statistics are correct as of the Netherlands women's only Test match, against South Africa on 28 July 2007.

General					Batting							Bowling					Fielding	
Cap	Name	First	Last	Mat	Inn	NO	Runs	HS	100	50	Avg	Balls	Wkt	BBI	BBM	Ave	Ca	St
1	Marloes Braat	2007	2007	1	2	1	6	4	0	0	6.00	15	2	2/11	2/11	5.50	0	0
2	Caroline de Fouw	2007	2007	1	2	0	2	2	0	0	1.00	120	3	3/27	3/51	17.00	1	0
3	Lotte Egging	2007	2007	1	2	1	5	5*	0	0	5.00	90	1	1/28	1/28	28.00	2	0
4	Jolet Hartenhof	2007	2007	1	2	0	0	0	0	0	0.00	186	4	4/62	4/62	21.50	0	0
5	Leonie Hoitink	2007	2007	1	2	0	1	1	0	0	0.50	–	–	–	–	–	0	0
6	Mandy Kornet	2007	2007	1	2	0	11	6	0	0	5.50	90	1	1/50	1/50	50.00	0	0
7	Maartje Köster	2007	2007	1	2	0	38	29	0	0	19.00	–	–	–	–	–	1	0
8	Marijn Nijman	2007	2007	1	2	0	5	5	0	0	2.50	90	0	–	–	–	0	0
9	Helmien Rambaldo ‡	2007	2007	1	2	0	18	17	0	0	9.00	–	–	–	–	–	1	0
10	Annemarie Tanke	2007	2007	1	2	0	0	0	0	0	0.00	60	1	1/39	1/39	39.00	0	0
11	Violet Wattenberg †	2007	2007	1	2	0	52	49	0	0	26.00	–	–	–	–	–	1	2
