= Elise Reynolds =

Dutch cricketer

Personal information
- Full name: Elise Irene Reynolds
- Born: 25 March 1969 (age 57); Bridgeport, Connecticut, U.S.
- Batting: Right-handed
- Bowling: Right-arm fast-medium
- Role: Bowler

International information
- National side: Netherlands
- ODI debut (cap 39): 5 July 1997 v Denmark
- Last ODI: 16 December 2000 v Australia

Career statistics
Competition	ODI
Matches	16
Runs scored	11
Batting average	1.37
100s/50s	0/0
Top score	5*
Balls bowled	686
Wickets	10
Bowling average	33.50
5 wickets in innings	0
10 wickets in match	0
Best bowling	3/9
Catches/stumpings	5/–
- Source: CricketArchive, 6 January 2015

Elise Irene Reynolds (born 25 March 1969) is a former Dutch cricketer who played sixteen women's One Day Internationals (ODIs) for the Dutch national side, including at the 1997 and 2000 World Cups.

Born in Bridgeport, Connecticut, to Dutch-American parents, Reynolds attended school in England and the Netherlands, where she was introduced to cricket. Before debuting for the Dutch national side, she played club cricket for the VRA Amsterdam women's side, and was also involved in coaching at the club, based in Amstelveen. Reynolds made her ODI debut in July 1997 against Denmark. Her debut came at the Mikkelberg-Kunst-und-Cricket Center in Hattstedt, Germany, in the first match of the Dutch team's inaugural series against the Danish national side. A right-arm fast-medium bowler, she took 1/12 from eight overs on debut, her only wicket being Danish opener Karin Mikkelsen.

Reynolds did not play the second ODI against Denmark, but was selected for all three ODIs played during the November 1997 Dutch tour of Sri Lanka, which preceded the 1997 World Cup in India. She played in only two of the five matches that the Netherlands played at the tournament, against New Zealand and Sri Lanka, with the team reaching the quarter-finals for the first and only time. Reynolds' greatest success came at the 1999 European Cricket Championship, held in Denmark. She conceded only 49 runs from 25.2 overs at the tournament, finishing with an economy rate of 1.93 runs per over. Against Denmark, she took 3/9 from 10 overs, which included five maiden overs. Despite her efforts, the Danish team won the match by three wickets, with the Dutchwomen having earlier been bowled out for 88 runs.

At the 2000 World Cup, hosted by New Zealand, Reynolds played in six of the Netherlands' seven matches, missing only the game against Ireland. She bowled more overs than any other Dutch fast bowler, with only medium-pacer Teuntje de Boer and off-spinners Carolien Salomons and Caroline de Fouw bowling more than her. However, Reynolds failed to take a single wicket at the tournament, conceding 163 runs. The Dutch team's final match against Australia, an eventual finalist, was her last at ODI level. Outside of playing cricket, Reynolds is a freelance Dutch–English translator, and also a painter, having exhibited in several Amsterdam venues.
