= Maartje Köster =

Dutch cricketer

Personal information
- Full name: Maartje Alexandra Köster
- Born: 3 March 1975 (age 51); Utrecht, Netherlands
- Batting: Right-handed
- Bowling: Right-arm medium
- Role: Batter

International information
- National side: Netherlands (1995–2007)
- Only Test (cap 7): 28 July 2007 v South Africa
- ODI debut (cap 36): 19 July 1995 v Ireland
- Last ODI: 2 August 2007 v South Africa

Career statistics
Competition	WTest	WODI	WLA
Matches	1	46	49
Runs scored	38	539	579
Batting average	19.00	15.40	15.64
100s/50s	0/0	0/1	0/1
Top score	29	58*	58*
Balls bowled	–	338	383
Wickets	–	6	7
Bowling average	–	38.00	38.00
5 wickets in innings	–	0	0
10 wickets in match	–	0	0
Best bowling	–	1/8	1/8
Catches/stumpings	1/–	10/–	10/–
- Source: CricketArchive, 2 December 2021

Maartje Alexander Köster (born 3 March 1975) is a Dutch former cricketer who played as a right-handed batter. She appeared in one Test match and 46 One Day Internationals for the Netherlands between 1995 and 2007, including playing at the 1997 and 2000 World Cups and in the Netherlands' inaugural Test match.

Born in Utrecht, Köster made her One Day International (ODI) debut at the age of 20, playing two matches in the 1995 edition of the European Championship, hosted in Ireland. At the 1997 World Cup in India, she played in all of her team's matches, but scored only 31 runs from four innings. Köster remained a fixture in the Dutch team throughout the rest of the decade, and began to be used higher in the order, including on several occasions as an opening batter. During the Dutch tour of Sri Lanka in March 1999, she scored what was to be her only ODI half-century, making 58* from 89 balls coming in fifth in the batting order.

At the 2000 World Cup in New Zealand, Köster featured in five of a possible seven matches, scoring 65 runs. Against South Africa, she topscored with 36 from 85 balls, opening the batting with Caroline de Fouw. Outside of the European Championship, Köster's next international tournament for the Netherlands was the 2003 IWCC Trophy, the qualifier for the 2005 World Cup. At that tournament, she scored 111 runs from five innings, but was dismissed only twice. Her consequent batting average of 55.50 was the second-best overall at the tournament, behind teammate Pauline te Beest. In two matches, Köster was the top-scorer for the Netherlands, making 40* against the West Indies and 49 against Pakistan.

In July and August 2007, South Africa went on a tour of the Netherlands, playing three ODIs and a Test – the first (and so far only) Test match played by any Dutch team, men or women. Selected in the Test squad, Köster scored 29 runs from 178 balls in the first innings, and added nine more runs in the second. Her match total of 38 runs was surpassed by only wicket-keeper Violet Wattenberg, who made 52. In the ODI series, Köster played in only the first match, which was her last international game – she was selected in the squad for the 2007 European Championship, but did not play. She finished her career with 46 ODI appearances, behind only Pauline te Beest for the Netherlands, although that mark has since been equalled by Helmien Rambaldo and beaten by Carolien Salomons. Köster is one of only five Dutchwomen to pass 500 runs in ODIs.
