= Carly Verheul =

Dutch cricketer

Personal information
- Born: 12 January 1980 (age 46); Heemstede, Netherlands
- Batting: Right-handed
- Role: Batter
- Relatives: Carly Merd Sofie Verheul

International information
- National side: Netherlands (1999–2002)
- ODI debut (cap 51): 25 March 1999 v Sri Lanka
- Last ODI: 28 June 2002 v New Zealand

Career statistics
Competition	WODI
Matches	10
Runs scored	74
Batting average	9.25
100s/50s	0/0
Top score	46*
Balls bowled	18
Wickets	0
Bowling average	–
5 wickets in innings	–
10 wickets in match	–
Best bowling	–
Catches/stumpings	2/–
- Source: CricketArchive, 18 October 2015

Carly Merd Sofie Verheul (born 12 January 1980) is a former Dutch international cricketer whose career for the Dutch national side spanned from 1999 to 2002. She played in ten One Day International (ODI) matches, including at the 2000 World Cup. Her club cricket was played for Rood en Wit.

Born in Heemstede, North Holland, Verheul made her Dutch senior debut at the age of 19, when she was included in the squad for its March 1999 tour of Sri Lanka. She went on to play in the third and fourth ODIs of the series. Verheul's next appearance for the national side came at the 1999 1999 European Championship, when she played against Denmark. She made 17 runs from seventh in the batting order, which was her team's equal highest score (with Pauline te Beest) as they were bowled out for 88. At the 2000 World Cup in New Zealand, Verheul was one of her team's youngest players, and played in four of a possible seven matches. Her best innings, 46 not out from balls, came against India, and was the second-best by a Dutch player (after Rowan Milburn's 71). Verheul's next internationals came at the 2001 European Championship in England. Against Ireland, she was at the crease for 35 balls, but scored only two runs, for a strike rate of only 5.71. Verheul played one final ODI in June 2002, against the touring New Zealand team. She finished with a career batting average of 9.25.
