= Marijn Nijman =

Dutch cricketer

Personal information
- Full name: Marijn Elise Nijman
- Born: 27 August 1985 (age 41); Groningen, Netherlands
- Batting: Right-handed
- Bowling: Right-arm medium
- Role: All-rounder

International information
- National side: Netherlands (2004–2011)
- Only Test (cap 8): 28 July 2007 v South Africa
- ODI debut (cap 66): 19 August 2005 v Ireland
- Last ODI: 24 November 2011 v Ireland
- T20I debut (cap 18): 6 August 2009 v Ireland
- Last T20I: 24 April 2011 v Pakistan

Career statistics
Competition	WTest	WODI	WT20I	WLA
Matches	1	21	6	34
Runs scored	5	292	55	550
Batting average	2.50	15.36	13.75	19.64
100s/50s	0/0	0/0	0/0	0/2
Top score	5	43	29*	99
Balls bowled	90	348	–	618
Wickets	0	5	–	11
Bowling average	–	56.80	–	43.45
5 wickets in innings	–	0	–	0
10 wickets in match	–	0	–	0
Best bowling	–	1/24	–	3/10
Catches/stumpings	0/–	6/–	0/–	11/–
- Source: CricketArchive, 2 December 2021

Marijn Elise Nijman (born 27 August 1985) is a Dutch former cricketer who played as an all-rounder, batting right-handed and bowling right-arm medium. She appeared in one Test match, 21 One Day Internationals and six Twenty20 Internationals for the Netherlands between 2005 and 2011.

Nijman was born in Groningen, and played her club cricket for Schiedam's Hermes-DVS. She made her senior debut for the Netherlands in 2004, and her One Day International (ODI) debut the following year, against Ireland. In 2007, Nijman was selected in the Dutch squad for its inaugural Test match. She was a regular in the team right up until it lost its ODI status at the 2011 World Cup Qualifier, which was her final international tournament. Nijman had little success at international level, but fared better in the Women's County Championship, including in 2010 scoring 99 from 58 balls against Cornwall.
