= Laudadio Rambaldo =

Italian painter

Laudadio Rambaldo (late 14th century) was an Italian painter active in Ferrara, also known as Rambaldo di Ferrara. According to Lanzi, flourished about 1386 and painted in the Church of the Servi at Castel Tedaldo.
