= Lotte Egging =

Dutch cricketer (born 1988)

Personal information
- Full name: Lotte Egging
- Born: 8 June 1988 (age 38); Nijmegen, Netherlands
- Batting: Right-handed
- Bowling: Right-arm medium-fast
- Role: Bowler

International information
- National side: Netherlands (2005–2008)
- Only Test (cap 3): 28 July 2007 v South Africa
- ODI debut (cap 65): 19 August 2005 v Ireland
- Last ODI: 9 July 2008 v West Indies
- T20I debut (cap 4): 1 July 2008 v West Indies
- Last T20I: 12 July 2008 v West Indies

Career statistics
Competition	WTest	WODI	WT20I	WLA
Matches	1	12	2	19
Runs scored	5	23	0	27
Batting average	5.00	3.83	0.00	3.85
100s/50s	0/0	0/0	0/0	0/0
Top score	5*	7	0	7
Balls bowled	90	587	42	857
Wickets	1	12	3	17
Bowling average	28.00	40.91	17.33	41.29
5 wickets in innings	0	0	0	0
10 wickets in match	0	0	0	0
Best bowling	1/28	4/56	2/24	4/56
Catches/stumpings	2/–	6/–	1/–	8/–
- Source: CricketArchive, 3 December 2021

Lotte Egging (born 8 June 1988) is a Dutch former cricketer who played as a right-arm medium-fast bowler. She appeared in one Test match, 12 One Day Internationals and two Twenty20 Internationals for the Netherlands between 2005 and 2008. She took a hat-trick in an ODI against Pakistan at the 2008 World Cup Qualifier.
