= Jiska Howard =

Dutch cricketer

Personal information
- Born: 6 September 1971 (age 55); Delft, Netherlands
- Batting: Right-handed
- Role: Batsman

International information
- National side: Netherlands (1990–1999)
- ODI debut (cap 26): 20 July 1990 v Denmark
- Last ODI: 21 July 1999 v Denmark

Career statistics
Competition	WODI
Matches	21
Runs scored	207
Batting average	9.85
100s/50s	0/1
Top score	66
Catches/stumpings	0/–
- Source: CricketArchive, 23 August 2015

Jiska Howard (born 6 September 1971) is a Dutch former cricketer who played 21 One Day Internationals (ODIs) for the Dutch national side, including at the 1993 and 1997 World Cups.

Born in Delft, with roots in Barbados, Howard played her club cricket for USV Hercules, Kampong CC, and Country Club PW. She made her ODI debut for the Netherlands at the age of 18, against Denmark at the 1990 edition of the European Championship. She topscored in that match, making 29 runs as an opening batsman with Irene Schoof, but did not appear again until the 1993 World Cup in England. At that tournament, Howard scored only seven runs from three matches, against India, New Zealand, and Denmark.

Howard played in all three of the Netherlands' matches at the 1995 European Championship, and also played in two of the three ODIs played when the Dutch team toured Sri Lanka in November 1997. That tour was a warm-up for the 1997 World Cup, which was played in India the following month. At the World Cup, Howard played in only two matches, scoring a duck in a group stage loss to New Zealand and 12 runs in the semi-final loss to Australia. Her opening partners were Nicola Payne and Edmee Janss, respectively. Howard appeared in bilateral ODI series in both 1998 (against Denmark in Germany) and 1999 (against Sri Lanka in Sri Lanka). In the second match of the latter series, she scored 66 runs out of a team total of 152/8, her highest ODI score and only half-century. Her innings included eleven fours, and was made from fourth in the batting order.

Howard's final ODIs came during the 1999 European Championship in Denmark, at the age of 28. She finished with a batting average of only 9.85 from her 21 ODIs, and, unusually, did not record a single catch during her career.
