= Barbara Daniels (cricketer) =

English cricketer (born 1964)

Personal information
- Full name: Barbara Ann Daniels
- Born: 17 December 1964 (age 61); Middleton Priors, Shropshire, England
- Batting: Right-handed
- Bowling: Right-arm medium
- Role: Batter

International information
- National side: England (1993–2000)
- Test debut (cap 115): 17 November 1995 v India
- Last Test: 21 August 1998 v Australia
- ODI debut (cap 63): 20 July 1993 v Denmark
- Last ODI: 14 December 2000 v New Zealand

Domestic team information
- Years: Team
- 1982–1999: West Midlands
- 2000–2001: Staffordshire

Career statistics
| Competition | WTest | WODI | WFC | WLA |
|---|---|---|---|---|
| Matches | 9 | 55 | 12 | 135 |
| Runs scored | 441 | 1,309 | 522 | 4,335 |
| Batting average | 31.50 | 27.27 | 30.70 | 38.36 |
| 100s/50s | 1/0 | 1/7 | 1/0 | 6/27 |
| Top score | 160 | 142* | 160 | 156 |
| Balls bowled | 98 | – | 386 | 2,064 |
| Wickets | 3 | – | 5 | 43 |
| Bowling average | 26.33 | – | 43.00 | 29.20 |
| 5 wickets in innings | 0 | – | 0 | 1 |
| 10 wickets in match | 0 | – | 0 | 0 |
| Best bowling | 1/9 | – | 2/56 | 5/26 |
| Catches/stumpings | 4/– | 16/– | 6/– | 62/– |
- Source: CricketArchive, 14 February 2021

Barbara Ann Daniels (born 17 December 1964) is an English cricketer and former member of the English women's cricket team. She played nine Test matches and 55 One Day Internationals. She was part of England's squad that won the World Cup in 1993. She played domestic cricket for West Midlands and Staffordshire.
