= Rowan Milburn =

New Zealand cricketer (born 1977)

Personal information
- Full name: Rowan Claire Milburn
- Born: 18 June 1977 (age 49); Mosgiel, New Zealand
- Batting: Right-handed
- Role: Wicket-keeper
- Relatives: Barry Milburn (father)

International information
- National sides: Netherlands (2000); New Zealand (2007)
- ODI debut (cap 54/105): 30 November 2000; Netherlands v England
- Last ODI: 30 August 2007; New Zealand v England
- T20I debut (cap 22): 10 August 2007; New Zealand v South Africa
- Last T20I: 16 August 2007; New Zealand v England

Domestic team information
- Years: Team
- 1996/97–2001/02: Otago
- 2002/03–2008/09: Canterbury

Career statistics
Competition	WODI	WT20I	WLA	WT20
Matches	15	2	128	11
Runs scored	237	1	1,586	41
Batting average	18.23	–	17.05	20.50
100s/50s	0/1	0/0	0/3	0/0
Top score	71	1*	82	13*
Catches/stumpings	7/5	0/1	85/42	6/5
- Source: CricketArchive, 18 April 2021

Rowan Claire Milburn (born 18 June 1977) is a New Zealand former cricketer who played as a wicket-keeper and right-handed batter. She appeared in 7 One Day Internationals for the Netherlands in 2000, and 8 One Day Internationals and 2 Twenty20 Internationals for New Zealand in 2007. She played domestic cricket for Otago and Canterbury in New Zealand.

While playing in the Dutch domestic competition, she was selected to play for the Netherlands in the 2000 World Cup in New Zealand. She made the team's only fifty of the tournament when she scored 71 against Ireland.

She became a schoolteacher. She was Assistant Principal of Mountainview High School in Timaru, and as of 2024 she is Principal of Hagley College in Christchurch.

She is the daughter of former New Zealand Test cricketer Barry Milburn, who was also a wicket-keeper.
