= Annemarie Tanke =

Dutch cricketer (born 1978)

Personal information
- Full name: Anne-Maria Suzanne Tanke
- Born: 27 February 1978 (age 48); Velsen, Netherlands
- Batting: Right-handed
- Bowling: Right-arm leg break
- Role: Bowler

International information
- National side: Netherlands (1997–2010)
- Only Test (cap 10): 28 July 2007 v South Africa
- ODI debut (cap 41): 6 July 1997 v Denmark
- Last ODI: 12 October 2010 v South Africa
- T20I debut (cap 9): 1 July 2008 v West Indies
- Last T20I: 16 October 2010 v West Indies

Career statistics
Competition	WTest	WODI	WT20I	WLA
Matches	1	39	5	55
Runs scored	0	451	29	546
Batting average	0.00	12.52	5.80	12.13
100s/50s	0/0	0/1	0/0	0/1
Top score	0	61	20	61
Balls bowled	60	787	78	1,509
Wickets	1	21	1	52
Bowling average	39.00	34.04	138.00	21.53
5 wickets in innings	0	1	0	1
10 wickets in match	0	0	0	0
Best bowling	1/39	5/40	1/18	5/40
Catches/stumpings	0/–	4/–	2/–	11/–
- Source: CricketArchive, 2 December 2021

Anne-Maria Suzanne Tanke (born 27 February 1978) is a Dutch former cricketer who played primarily as a right-arm leg break bowler. She appeared in one Test match, 39 One Day Internationals and five Twenty20 Internationals for the Netherlands between 1997 and 2010.
