= Helmien Rambaldo =

Dutch cricketer (born 1980)

Personal information
- Full name: Helmien Willie Rambaldo
- Born: 13 November 1980 (age 45); The Hague, Netherlands
- Batting: Right-handed
- Bowling: Right-arm off break
- Role: All-rounder
- Relatives: Caroline Rambaldo (sister)

International information
- National side: Netherlands (1998–2011)
- Only Test (cap 9): 28 July 2007 v South Africa
- ODI debut (cap 44): 25 July 1998 v Denmark
- Last ODI: 24 November 2011 v Ireland
- T20I debut (cap 7): 1 July 2008 v West Indies
- Last T20I: 20 August 2011 v Ireland

Domestic team information
- Years: Team
- 2003/04–2006/07: Boland

Career statistics
Competition	WTest	WODI	WT20I	WLA
Matches	1	46	10	105
Runs scored	18	723	154	2,350
Batting average	9.00	15.71	19.25	24.73
100s/50s	0/0	0/1	0/0	1/10
Top score	17	67	34	106*
Balls bowled	–	440	84	580
Wickets	–	6	1	10
Bowling average	–	57.83	92.00	40.90
5 wickets in innings	–	0	0	0
10 wickets in match	–	0	0	0
Best bowling	–	2/13	1/9	2/9
Catches/stumpings	1/–	13/–	4/–	36/–
- Source: CricketArchive, 2 December 2021

Helmien Willie Rambaldo (born 13 November 1980) is a Dutch former cricketer who played as a right-handed batter and occasional right-arm off break bowler. She appeared in one Test match, 46 One Day Internationals and 10 Twenty20 Internationals for the Netherlands between 1998 and 2011. Rambaldo captained the national side between 2007 and 2011, including in the team's inaugural Test and WT20I matches. She played domestic cricket for Boland in South Africa between 2003–04 and 2006–07.

== Life and career ==
Born in The Hague, Rambaldo's older sister, Caroline Rambaldo, also played international cricket for the Netherlands. Both sisters played their club cricket for Quick Haag (nl). Helmien Rambaldo made her ODI debut in July 1998, aged only 17, scoring two runs against Denmark in what was the first ODI played in Germany (at the Mikkelberg-Kunst-und-Cricket Center). Slotting into the side as a top-order batter, her next matches in that format came at the 1999 European Championship in Denmark. Her performance there was unremarkable, with only 16 runs from three innings, but she maintained her place in the Dutch squad for its next major tournament, the 2000 World Cup in New Zealand. At the World Cup, Rambaldo was selected for only three of a possible seven matches, but top-scored with 38 against Sri Lanka, opening the batting with Maartje Köster.

When the Netherlands toured Pakistan in April 2001, Rambaldo featured in six of their seven ODIs against the Pakistani national team, and finished the tournament behind only Pauline te Beest and Carolien Salomons for runs scored. In the sixth game, as the ninth player brought on to bowl, she finished 2/13 from five overs – her first ODI wickets and what were to be her best bowling figures. In 2003, Rambaldo moved to South Africa to study sport science at Western Cape's Stellenbosch University. She continued to play for the Netherlands throughout her degree, but also played cricket for her university and for Boland in the South African provincial set-up, until graduating in 2006.

In July and August 2007, South Africa went on a tour of the Netherlands, playing three ODIs and a Test – the first (and so far only) Test match played by any Dutch team, men or women. The Test was Rambaldo's first international match as captain, with Carolien Salomons having stepped down the previous year. She would remain the side's captain until she stepped down prior to the 2012 season. At the 2008 World Cup Qualifier in South Africa, Rambaldo played a key role in helping the Netherlands to a semi-final. In a group-stage game against Bermuda, she was player of the match, scoring 59 from 55 balls opening with Violet Wattenberg, and helping the Dutch team to a 196-run win. Later in the tournament, in the semi-final against Pakistan, Rambaldo caught Pakistani number-eleven batsman Sadia Yousuf at short cover to give Lotte Egging a hat-trick, the first by a Dutchwoman.

Rambaldo only recorded one half-century in her ODI career, 67 against Sri Lanka in the 2010 Women's Cricket Challenge in South Africa. Her next-best had been 46 against Japan in the 2003 IWCC Trophy. Rambaldo finished her career with 723 runs from 46 ODIs, in both cases behind only Pauline te Beest and Carolien Salomons for the Netherlands. She captained the Netherlands in one Test, 25 ODIs, and ten T20Is, with the team winning only a single match under her captaincy in those formats – an ODI against Ireland at the 2011 European Championship, by two wickets.
