= Caroline de Fouw =

Dutch cricketer

Personal information
- Full name: Margaretha Everdine Caroline de Fouw
- Born: 12 May 1966 (age 60); The Hague, Netherlands
- Batting: Right-handed
- Bowling: Right-arm off spin
- Role: Bowler

International information
- National side: Netherlands (1986–2018)
- Only Test (cap 2): 28 July 2007 v South Africa
- ODI debut (cap 27): 16 July 1991 v Denmark
- Last ODI: 9 July 2008 v West Indies
- T20I debut (cap 2): 1 July 2008 v West Indies
- Last T20I: 12 July 2018 v Uganda

Career statistics
Competition	WTest	WODI	WT20I	WLA
Matches	1	35	6	42
Runs scored	2	163	14	196
Batting average	1.00	6.79	4.66	7.53
100s/50s	0/0	0/0	0/0	0/0
Top score	2	23	8	23
Balls bowled	120	1,099	106	1,471
Wickets	3	26	6	40
Bowling average	17.00	25.30	19.66	19.77
5 wickets in innings	0	0	0	0
10 wickets in match	0	0	0	0
Best bowling	3/27	3/23	3/31	4/14
Catches/stumpings	1/–	9/0	0/–	9/–
- Source: CricketArchive, 3 December 2021

Margaretha Everdine Caroline de Fouw (born 12 May 1966) is a Dutch former cricketer who played as a right-arm off break bowler. She appeared in one Test match, 35 One Day Internationals and 6 Twenty20 Internationals for the Netherlands between 1991 and 2018. Her tally of 26 ODI wickets has only been surpassed by Carolien Salomons and Sandra Kottman for the Netherlands.

Born in The Hague, de Fouw played club cricket for KZKC (Klein Zwitserland de Krekels Combinatie). Her Dutch national team debut came in the 1986 Women's Quadrangular Tournament in Ireland, where she played against Ireland and Denmark. De Fouw made her ODI debut aged 25, at the 1991 European Championship, which was being held in the Netherlands for the first time.

Aged 42 at the time of her last ODI, de Fouw is the oldest woman to appear in an ODI for the Netherlands, and her ODI career span of almost 17 years has only been surpassed by fourteen women worldwide.

In April 2008, de Fouw served as a coach for the ICC European Women's Academy in La Manga Club, Spain. She later gained a Level-3 coaching diploma from the England and Wales Cricket Board (ECB), and has worked in various development roles with the Koninklijke Nederlandse Cricket Bond (KNCB), the governing body for Dutch cricket.

In June 2018, she returned to international cricket for the first time since 2008, playing for the Netherlands at the 2018 ICC Women's World Twenty20 Qualifier tournament. She was at the time the oldest woman from any country to appear in a Twenty20 International.
