= Teuntje de Boer =

Dutch cricketer (born 1968)

Personal information
- Full name: Martien Louise de Boer
- Born: 31 May 1968 (age 58); Hengelo, Netherlands

International information
- National side: Netherlands
- ODI debut (cap 47): 21 March 1999 v Sri Lanka
- Last ODI: 12 August 2001 v Scotland
- Source: ESPNcricinfo, 25 October 2016

Teuntje de Boer (born 31 May 1968) is a Dutch former cricketer. She played fourteen Women's One Day International matches for the Netherlands women's national cricket team. She was part of the Netherlands squad for the 2000 Women's Cricket World Cup.
