= Jolet Hartenhof =

Dutch cricketer (born 1979)

Personal information
- Full name: Jolet Caroline Hartenhof
- Born: 23 September 1979 (age 47) s-Gravenhage, Netherlands
- Batting: Right-handed
- Bowling: Right-arm fast-medium
- Role: Bowler

International information
- National side: Netherlands (1998–2011)
- Only Test (cap 4): 28 July 2007 v South Africa
- ODI debut (cap 45): 26 July 1998 v Denmark
- Last ODI: 24 November 2011 v Ireland
- T20I debut (cap 6): 1 July 2008 v West Indies
- Last T20I: 20 August 2011 v Ireland

Career statistics
Competition	WTest	WODI	WT20I	WLA
Matches	1	28	4	46
Runs scored	0	8	–	9
Batting average	0.00	0.72	–	0.75
100s/50s	0/0	0/0	–	0/0
Top score	0	4*	–	4*
Balls bowled	186	939	76	1,665
Wickets	4	22	1	37
Bowling average	21.50	30.95	85.00	28.51
5 wickets in innings	0	0	0	0
10 wickets in match	0	0	0	0
Best bowling	4/62	3/29	1/24	3/5
Catches/stumpings	0/–	2/–	0/–	3/–
- Source: CricketArchive, 3 December 2021

Jolet Caroline Hartenhof (born 23 September 1979) is a Dutch former cricketer who played as a right-arm fast-medium bowler. She made her Test debut in July 2007, against South Africa, which remains the only Test match she has played. She also played 28 One Day Internationals and four Twenty20 Internationals for the Netherlands between 1998 and 2011.
