= Caroline Rambaldo =

Dutch cricketer

Personal information
- Full name: Caroline H. Rambaldo
- Born: 7 January 1971 (age 55)
- Batting: Left-handed
- Bowling: Right-arm medium
- Relatives: Helmien Rambaldo (sister)

International information
- National side: Netherlands (1997–2001)
- ODI debut (cap 40): 6 July 1997 v Denmark
- Last ODI: 21 April 2001 v Pakistan

Career statistics
Competition	WODI
Matches	23
Runs scored	106
Batting average	5.88
100s/50s	0/0
Top score	25
Balls bowled	896
Wickets	19
Bowling average	26.84
5 wickets in innings	0
10 wickets in match	0
Best bowling	2/10
Catches/stumpings	1/–
- Source: Cricinfo, 4 October 2015

Caroline H. Rambaldo (born 7 January 1971) is a former Dutch international cricketer whose career for the Netherlands national women's side spanned from 1997 to 2001. She played a total of 23 One Day International (ODI) matches, and appeared at the 1997 World Cup.

Rambaldo made her international debut at the relatively late age of 26, appearing in the second match of a two-ODI series against Denmark, which was played in Germany in July 1997. Later in the year, she played another three ODIs against Sri Lanka, as part of the Netherlands' preparation for the 1997 World Cup in India. A right-arm medium-pacer, Rambaldo played only three of a possible five matches at the World Cup, but saved her best performance for her team's last match, taking 2/28 in the quarter-final loss to Australia.

One of the older players in the squad, Rambaldo was a regular for the Netherlands throughout the rest of the decade (and into the first years of the 2000s), playing series against Pakistan, Sri Lanka, and Denmark, as well as the 1999 European Championship. She never took more than two wickets in a match, with her best figures being 2/10 from 10 overs against Denmark in July 1998. Despite this, Rambaldo finished her international career with 19 wickets from her 23 ODI matches. Her last international appearance came against Pakistan in April 2001, at Karachi's National Stadium. Rambaldo's younger sister, Helmien Rambaldo, also played internationally, and went on to captain the national team. Both sisters played their club cricket for Quick Haag (nl).
