= Sandra Kottman =

Dutch cricketer (born 1967)

Personal information
- Born: 20 May 1967 (age 59); Haarlem, Netherlands

International information
- National side: Netherlands
- ODI debut (cap 28): 17 July 1991 v England
- Last ODI: 26 July 2003 v Pakistan
- Source: ESPNcricinfo, 25 October 2016

Sandra Kottman (born 20 May 1967) is a Dutch former cricketer. She played 32 Women's One Day International (WODI) matches for the Netherlands women's national cricket team. She was part of the Netherlands squad for the 1997 and 2000 Women's Cricket World Cup.

She made her WODI debut against England on 17 July 1991.
