= Cheraldine Oudolf =

Dutch cricketer (born 1980)

Personal information
- Full name: Cheraldine Fredrika Francina Oudolf
- Born: 4 May 1980 (age 46); Haarlem, Netherlands
- Batting: Right-handed
- Bowling: Right-arm medium fast

International information
- National side: Netherlands (1995–2009)
- ODI debut (cap 35): 18 July 1995 v England
- Last ODI: 5 August 2009 v Ireland
- T20I debut (cap 13): 6 July 2008 v West Indies
- Last T20I: 6 August 2009 v Ireland

Career statistics
Competition	WODI	WT20I
Matches	36	2
Runs scored	165	18
Batting average	5.68	9.00
100s/50s	0/0	0/0
Top score	32	9
Balls bowled	1,188	–
Wickets	25	–
Bowling average	30.28	–
5 wickets in innings	1	–
10 wickets in match	0	–
Best bowling	5/20	–
Catches/stumpings	10/–	0/–
- Source: ESPNcricinfo, 18 March 2024

Cheraldine Oudolf (born 4 May 1980) is a Dutch former cricketer. She played 36 Women's One Day International matches for the Netherlands women's national cricket team. She played for the Netherlands at both the 1997 and 2000 World Cups. Her 5/20 against Sri Lanka in 1997 remain the best figures by a Dutch woman in ODI cricket.

She played 2 Women's Twenty20 International matches for the Netherlands women's national cricket team. She made her WT20I debut against West Indies on 6 July 2008.
