= Pauline te Beest =

Dutch cricketer (born 1970)

Personal information
- Full name: Pauline Jantina te Beest
- Born: 13 February 1970 (age 56); Haarlem, Netherlands
- Batting: Right-handed
- Role: Wicket-keeper

International information
- National side: Netherlands (1990–2008)
- ODI debut (cap 25): 18 July 1990 v England
- Last ODI: 24 February 2008 v Ireland

Career statistics
Competition	WODI
Matches	64
Runs scored	1,361
Batting average	22.31
100s/50s	2/4
Top score	142
Balls bowled	78
Wickets	3
Bowling average	25.33
5 wickets in innings	0
10 wickets in match	0
Best bowling	2/11
Catches/stumpings	24/1
- Source: ESPNcricinfo, 13 December 2021

Pauline Jantina te Beest (born 13 February 1970 in Haarlem) is a Netherlands former cricketer who played in three Women's Cricket World Cups, in England (1993), in India (1997) and in New Zealand (2000). She had one season for the Otago Sparks in the State League in New Zealand. She was the first Dutch women's cricketer to score 1,000 runs in One-Day Internationals.

== See also ==
- List of centuries in women's One Day International cricket
