= Carolien Salomons =

Dutch cricketer (born 1974)

Personal information
- Full name: Carolien Aimee Salomons
- Born: 20 July 1974 (age 52); Amsterdam, Netherlands
- Batting: Right-handed
- Bowling: Right-arm off spin
- Role: All-rounder

International information
- National side: Netherlands (1995–2011)
- ODI debut (cap 37): 20 July 1995 v Denmark
- Last ODI: 17 August 2011 v Ireland
- T20I debut (cap 8): 1 July 2008 v West Indies
- Last T20I: 20 August 2011 v Ireland

Career statistics
Competition	WODI	WT20I
Matches	51	5
Runs scored	894	59
Batting average	20.31	11.80
100s/50s	0/5	0/0
Top score	89	27
Balls bowled	1,432	—
Wickets	37	—
Bowling average	18.67	—
5 wickets in innings	0	—
10 wickets in match	0	—
Best bowling	3/11	—
Catches/stumpings	23/1	2/–
- Source: ESPNCricinfo, 19 November 2015

Carolien Aimee Salomons (born 20 July 1974) is a former Dutch international cricketer whose career for the national women's side spanned from 1995 to 2011. She played for the Netherlands at both the 1997 and 2000 World Cups, and served as the team's captain between 2001 and 2006.
