= Netherlands women's national cricket team =

Cricket team

Netherlands
- Netherlands Cricket logo
- Nickname: Lionesses
- Association: Royal Dutch Cricket Association

Personnel
- Captain: Babette de Leede
- Coach: Neil MacRae

History
- Test status acquired: 2007; 19 years ago

International Cricket Council
- ICC status: Associate member (1966; 60 years ago)
- ICC region: Europe
ICC Rankings	Current	Best-ever
ODI	13th	12th (26 Nov 2022)
T20I	15th	15th (01 Jan 2024)

Tests
- Only Test: v. South Africa at the Hazelaarweg Stadion, Rotterdam; 28–31 July 2007
Tests	Played	Won/Lost
Total	1	0/1 (0 draws)

One Day Internationals
- First ODI: v. New Zealand at Sportpark Koninklijke HFC, Haarlem; 8 August 1984
- Last ODI: v. Scotland at New Williamfield, Stirling; 31 August 2026
ODIs	Played	Won/Lost
Total	116	24/91 (0 ties, 1 no result)
This year	2	1/1 (0 ties, 0 no results)
- World Cup appearances: 4 (first in 1988)
- Best result: 5th (1988)
- Women's World Cup Qualifier appearances: 3 (first in 2003)
- Best result: 3rd (2003)

T20 Internationals
- First T20I: v. West Indies at Sportpark Maarschalkerweerd, Utrecht; 1 July 2008
- Last T20I: v. Sri Lanka at Karwan Cricket Ground, Ajman; 22 November 2026
T20Is	Played	Won/Lost
Total	121	56/59 (2 ties, 4 no results)
This year	22	10/12 (0 ties, 0 no results)
- T20 World Cup appearances: 1 (first in 2026)
- Best result: Group Stage (2026)
- T20 World Cup Qualifier appearances: 3 (first in 2013)
- Best result: 4th (2013)
ODI & T20I kit
- As of 22 November 2026

The Netherlands women's national cricket team, nicknamed the Lionesses, represents the Netherlands in international women's cricket. The team is organised by the Royal Dutch Cricket Association, which has been an associate member of the International Cricket Council (ICC) since 1966.

A Dutch women's team first played an international match in 1937, when Australia toured on its way to play a series in England. The team regularly played fixtures against English club sides over the following decades, but it was not until the early 1980s that regular international competition commenced. The Netherlands made its One Day International (ODI) debut in 1984, against New Zealand, and made its World Cup debut at the 1988 edition of the tournament, in Australia. Considered a top-level team from the late 1980s through to the early 2000s, the Netherlands participated in four consecutive World Cups between 1988 and 2000, and made the quarter-finals of the 1997 event. The Dutch side retained its ODI status until the 2011 World Cup Qualifier. In 2007, the team played a one-off Test match against South Africa, joining Ireland as the only associate member of the ICC to play at that level.

In April 2018, the ICC granted full Women's Twenty20 International (WT20I) status to all its members. Therefore, all Twenty20 matches played between the Netherlands women and another international side since 1 July 2018 have the full WT20I status. In May 2022, the ICC announced the Netherlands as one of five women's sides to gain ODI status. Papua New Guinea, Scotland, Thailand and the United States were the other four teams.

== History ==
=== Early years ===
The Netherlands took part in women's international cricket from its earliest years. As early as 1937 they hosted the Australians on the first leg of their first ever Women's Ashes tour, before visiting England late the same year.

=== 1980s ===
The Dutch team played their first ODI in 1984 against New Zealand. This was 12 years before the Dutch men's team played their first ODI. They lost that game by 67 runs, and were next seen in international cricket in 1988, playing in their first World Cup, in which they finished in last place. They finished third in the first European Championship in 1989.

=== 1990s ===
They again finished third in the European Championship in 1990, and finished fourth the following year. The 1993 World Cup was again a disappointment, with another last place finish. 1995 saw them again finish third in the European Championship.

1997 was a busy year for the Dutch team, travelling to the Mikkelberg-Kunst-und-Cricket Center in Germany to play two ODIs against Denmark, a trip they repeated in 1998. They also visited Sri Lanka for a three match ODI series against the hosts, which they won 2–1. That remains the sole ODI series victory for the Dutch team. This was followed by the World Cup, in which they reached the quarter-finals.

1999 was a year with a steep learning curve when another tour to Sri Lanka, where they suffered a 5–0 defeat in the five-match ODI series. After the European Championship in Denmark the Dutch rebuilt their squad and structure.

=== 2000s ===
2000 saw the Dutch team's fourth World Cup appearance, where they finished last. This was followed in 2001 by a tour to Pakistan. the hosts took a 4–0 lead in the seven match ODI series but the Netherlands bounced back admirably winning the final three games. Later in the year saw a third-place finish in the European Championship.

Their cricket in 2002 was a three match ODI series against New Zealand, which the Dutch were unable to win. The following year they hosted the 2003 IWCC Trophy, the inaugural edition of what is now the World Cup Qualifier. The Dutch finished third, but only the two finalists qualified for the 2005 World Cup.

Their next international engagement was the European Championship in 2005, finishing in fourth place. 2006 saw a two match ODI series against Ireland which was lost. Good news came from the ICC which announced that the top ten women's teams would have Test and ODI status. Their third-place finish in the IWCC Trophy in 2003 meant that the Dutch were included in this top ten. In February 2008 the Dutch women retained their test status for another four years by reaching the semi-final of the Women's Cricket World Cup Qualifier.

=== 2020s ===
In December 2020, the ICC announced the qualification pathway for the 2023 ICC Women's T20 World Cup. The Netherlands were named in the 2021 ICC Women's T20 World Cup Europe Qualifier regional group, alongside five other teams.

In May 2022 the ICC gave the Netherlands women ODI status together with PNG, Thailand, Scotland and the USA.

After a Netherlands women's cricket team bilateral series in Thailand, in November 2022, the team were given their first ever WODI Ranking. An ODI win over higher-ranked Thailand gave the Netherlands their best global ranking ever (12th).

In April and May the Netherlands played in the ICC T20 World Cup Global Qualifier in Abu Dhabi, missing the semi finals on net run rate.

In January 2026 the team secured its first ever T20 World Cup ticket in Kathmandu, winning five consecutive matches including those against Scotland, Thailand and USA.

== Sponsorship ==
SISAR B.V. became the official sponsor of the Dutch women's cricket team in December 2022. SISAR B.V. signed a sponsorship contract for three years with the KNCB.

In 2026 Da Vinci and Tachyon Security signed sponsorship deals with the KNCB just prior to the team's departure to the T20 World Cup Qualifier in Kathmandu.

== Squad ==
This lists all the players who have played for Netherlands for the past 12 months. Updated as of 1 July 2026.

Name	Age	Batting style	Bowling style	Forms	Notes
Batters
Sterre Kalis	27	Right-handed	Right-arm medium	ODI, T20I	
Phebe Molkenboer	21	Right-handed	Right-arm medium	ODI, T20I	
Sanya Khurana	21	Right-handed		ODI, T20I	
All-rounders
Robine Rijke	30	Right-handed	Right-arm medium	ODI, T20I	
Heather Siegers	30	Right-handed	Right-arm Offspin	ODI, T20I	
Wicket-keepers
Babette de Leede	27	Right-handed		ODI, T20I	captain
Rosalie Lawrence	19	Right-handed		ODI, T20I	
Spin Bowlers
Silver Siegers	26	Right-handed	Right-arm leg break	ODI, T20I	
Caroline de Lange	28	Right-handed	Right-arm leg break	ODI, T20I	
Pace Bowlers
Iris Zwilling	25	Right-handed	Right-arm medium	ODI, T20I	
Hannah Landheer	24	Right-handed	Right-arm medium	ODI, T20I	
Isabel van der Woning	25	Right-handed	Right-arm medium	ODI, T20I	
Myrthe van den Raad	20	Right-handend	Right-arm medium	ODI, T20I	
Lara Leemhuis	18	Right-handed	Right-arm medium	ODI, T20I	

== Tournament history ==
=== ICC Cricket World Cup ===
World Cup records
Year	Round	Position	Pld	W	L	T	NR
(England) 1973	Did not participate						
(India) 1978	Did not participate						
(New Zealand) 1982	Did not participate						
(Australia) 1988	Group stage	5th	8	0	8	0	0
(England) 1993	Group stage	8th	7	1	6	0	0
(India) 1997	Quarter finals	6th	5	1	3	0	1
(New Zealand) 2000	Group stage	8th	7	0	7	0	0
(England) 2005	Did not qualify						
(Australia) 2009	Did not qualify						
(India) 2013	Did not qualify						
(England) 2017	Did not qualify						
(New Zealand) 2022	Did not qualify						
(India) 2025	Did not qualify						
Total	4/12	0 titles	27	2	24	0	1

=== ICC Women's World T20 ===
Twenty20 World Cup records
Host Year	Round	GP	W	L	T	NR
(England) 2009	Did not qualify					
(Cricket West Indies) 2010	Did not qualify					
(Sri Lanka) 2012	Did not qualify					
(Bangladesh) 2014	Did not qualify					
(India) 2016	Did not qualify					
(Cricket West Indies) 2018	Did not qualify					
(Australia) 2020	Did not qualify					
(South Africa) 2023	Did not qualify					
(United Arab Emirates) 2024	Did not qualify					
(England) 2026	Group Stage	5	0	5	0	0
Total	0 Title	5	0	5	0	0

=== ICC Women's World Twenty20 Qualifier ===
ICC Women's World Twenty20 Qualifier records
Host Year	Round	Position	GP	W	L	T	NR
(Republic of Ireland) 2013	Group stage	4/7	5	1	4	0	0
(Thailand) 2015	Group stage	8/8	4	0	4	0	0
(Netherlands) 2018	Group stage	8/8	4	0	4	0	0
(Scotland) 2019	Group stage	6/8	4	1	3	0	0
(United Arab Emirates) 2022	Did not participate						
(United Arab Emirates) 2024	Group stage	6/10	4	2	2	0	0
(Nepal) 2026	Super 6	4/10	7	5	2	0	0
Total	6/7	0 Titles	28	9	19	0	0

=== ICC Women's T20 World Cup Europe Qualifier Division One ===
ICC Women's T20 World Cup Europe Qualifier Division One records
Host Year	Round	Position	GP	W	L	T	NR
(Spain) 2023	Runners-up	2/4	6	5	1	0	0
(Netherlands) 2025	Runners-up	2/4	6	4	2	0	0
Total	2/2	0 Titles	12	5	3	0	0

=== ICC Women's World Twenty20 Europe Qualifier ===
ICC Women's Twenty20 Qualifier Europe records
Year	Round	Position	GP	W	L	T	NR
(Spain) 2019	Round-robin	1/3	4	3	1	0	0
(Spain) 2021	Round-robin	3/5	4	2	2	0	0
Total	2/2	–	8	5	3	0	0

=== Women's European Cricket Championship/European Championship ===
Women's European Cricket Championship records
Year	Round	Position	GP	W	L	T	NR
(Denmark) 1989	Round-robin	3/4	3	1	2	0	0
(England) 1990	Round-robin	3/4	3	1	2	0	0
(Netherlands) 1991	Round-robin	4/4	3	1	2	0	0
(Republic of Ireland) 1995	Round-robin	3/4	3	1	2	0	0
(Denmark) 1999	Round-robin	4/4	3	0	3	0	0
(England) 2001	Round-robin	3/4	3	1	2	0	0
(England) 2005	Round-robin	2/2	1	0	1	0	0
(Netherlands) 2007	Round-robin	3/4	3	1	2	0	0
(Republic of Ireland) 2009	Round-robin	2/3	2	1	1	0	0
(Scotland) 2010	Round-robin	2/4	3	2	1	0	0
(Netherlands) 2011	Round-robin	Champion	2	2	0	0	0
Total	11/11	–	29	11	18	0	0

== Records and statistics ==
International Match Summary — Netherlands Women

Last updated 22 November 2026

Playing Record
Format	M	W	L	T	NR	Inaugural Match
Women's Test	1	0	1	0	0	28 July 2007
Women's One-Day Internationals	116	24	91	0	1	8 August 1984
Women's Twenty20 Internationals	121	56	59	2	4	6 August 2009

=== Women's Test cricket ===
- Highest team total: 108 v South Africa, 28 July 2007 at Hazelaarweg Stadion, Rotterdam.
- Highest individual score: 49, Violet Wattenberg v South Africa, 28 July 2007 at Hazelaarweg Stadion, Rotterdam.
- Best innings bowling: 4/62, Jolet Hartenhof v South Africa, 28 July 2007 at Hazelaarweg Stadion, Rotterdam.

Women's Test record versus other nations

Records complete to Women's Test #130. Last updated 31 July 2007.

Opponent	Matches	Won	Lost	Tied	N/R	First match	First win
ICC Full members
South Africa	1	0	1	0	0	28 July 2007	

=== Women's One-Day International ===
- Highest team total: 375/5 v Japan on 23 July 2003 at Sportpark Thurlede, Schiedam.
- Highest individual score: 142, Pauline te Beest v Japan on 23 July 2003 at Sportpark Thurlede, Schiedam.
- Best innings bowling: 5/20, Cheraldine Oudolf v Sri Lanka on 30 November 1997 at Asgiriya Stadium, Kandy.

Most ODI runs for Netherlands Women

Player	Runs	Average	Career span
Pauline te Beest	1361	22.31	1990–2008
Carolien Salomons	894	20.31	1995–2011
Helmien Rambaldo	723	15.71	1998–2011
Nicola Payne	631	18.02	1988–1998
Maartje Köster	539	15.40	1995–2007

Most ODI wickets for Netherlands Women

Player	Wickets	Average	Career span
Carolien Salomons	37	18.67	1995–2011
Sandra Kottman	31	25.54	1991–2003
Caroline de Fouw	26	25.30	1991–2008
Cheraldine Oudolf	25	30.28	1995–2009
Jet van Noortwijk	24	19.33	1989–1997

WODI record versus other nations

Records complete to WODI #1561. Last updated 31 August 2026.

Opponent	Matches	Won	Lost	Tied	N/R	First match	First win
ICC Full members
Australia	5	0	5	0	0	29 November 1988	
England	10	0	10	0	0	6 December 1988	
India	3	0	3	0	0	24 July 1993	
Ireland	25	2	23	0	0	30 November 1988	20 July 1989
New Zealand	9	0	9	0	0	8 August 1984	
Pakistan	12	4	7	0	1	9 April 2001	16 April 2001
South Africa	7	0	7	0	0	4 December 2000	
Sri Lanka	13	3	10	0	0	25 November 1997	25 November 1997
West Indies	7	1	6	0	0	21 July 1993	21 July 1993
ICC Associate members
Denmark	10	6	4	0	0	21 July 1989	20 July 1990
Japan	1	1	0	0	0	23 July 2003	23 July 2003
Papua New Guinea	2	2	0	0	0	5 August 2024	5 August 2024
Scotland	6	4	2	0	0	21 July 2003	21 July 2003
Thailand	6	1	5	0	0	20 November 2022	3 July 2023

=== Women's Twenty20 International cricket ===
- Highest team total: 255/3, v. Germany on 23 August 2025 at Hazelaarweg Stadium, Rotterdam.
- Highest individual innings: 126*, Sterre Kalis v. Germany on 27 June 2019 at La Manga Club Ground, Cartagena.
- Best innings bowling: 7/3, Frederique Overdijk v. France on 26 August 2021 at La Manga Club Ground, Cartagena.

Most WT20I runs for Netherlands Women

Player	Runs	Average	Career span
Sterre Kalis	2,053	34.79	2018–2026
Babette de Leede	1,800	22.50	2018–2026
Robine Rijke	1,497	20.22	2018–2026
Heather Siegers	1,339	19.98	2018–2026
Iris Zwilling	895	14.43	2019–2026

Most WT20I wickets for Netherlands Women

Player	Wickets	Average	Career span
Iris Zwilling	107	17.00	2019–2026
Caroline de Lange	89	18.91	2019–2026
Silver Siegers	61	26.13	2018–2026
Eva Lynch	45	17.75	2019–2025
Hannah Landheer	44	17.56	2019–2026

WT20I record versus other nations

Records complete to WT20I #3089. Last updated 22 November 2026.

Opponent	Matches	Won	Lost	Tied	N/R	First match	First win
ICC Full members
Australia	1	0	1	0	0	20 June 2026	
Bangladesh	7	2	5	0	0	8 July 2018	31 May 2026
India	1	0	1	0	0	17 June 2026	
Ireland	19	1	17	0	1	6 August 2009	30 July 2021
Pakistan	3	1	2	0	0	24 April 2011	15 November 2026
South Africa	2	0	2	0	0	14 October 2010	
Sri Lanka	2	0	1	0	1	24 April 2011	
West Indies	3	0	3	0	0	21 July 2008	
Zimbabwe	3	2	1	0	0	1 May 2024	1 May 2024
ICC Associate members
France	3	3	0	0	0	26 August 2021	26 August 2021
Germany	5	5	0	0	0	27 June 2019	27 June 2019
Hong Kong	4	4	0	0	0	17 June 2024	17 June 2024
Italy	6	6	0	0	0	8 September 2023	8 September 2023
Jersey	3	2	0	0	1	24 August 2023	24 August 2023
Namibia	7	5	2	0	0	3 September 2019	3 September 2019
Nepal	4	4	0	0	0	30 January 2025	30 January 2025
Papua New Guinea	3	0	2	0	1	10 July 2018	
Scotland	16	6	9	1	0	26 June 2019	26 June 2019
Tanzania	1	1	0	0	0	23 November 2025	23 November 2025
Thailand	15	5	10	0	0	10 August 2019	30 November 2022
Uganda	2	1	1	0	0	12 July 2018	30 November 2025
United Arab Emirates	4	1	2	1	0	7 July 2018	21 November 2025
United States	6	6	0	0	0	5 September 2019	5 September 2019
Vanuatu	1	1	0	0	0	27 April 2024	27 April 2024

== See also ==
- List of Netherlands women Test cricketers
- List of Netherlands women ODI cricketers
- List of Netherlands women Twenty20 International cricketers
