= 2011 Women's European Cricket Championship =

- Dates: 17 – 19 August 2011
- Administrator: European Cricket Council
- Cricket format: List A, One Day International
- Tournament format: Round-robin
- Host: Netherlands
- Champions: Netherlands (1st title)
- Participants: 3
- Matches: 3
- Most runs: (Netherlands) Helmien Rambaldo (144)
- Most wickets: (Netherlands) Esther Lanser (4) (Netherlands) Esther de Lange (4)

The 2011 Women's European Cricket Championship was an international cricket tournament held in Ireland from 17 to 19 August 2011. It was the eleventh edition of the Women's European Championship.

Similar to earlier editions, in this edition too, three teams participated including the hosts, Ireland, the Netherlands, and Scotland. As Scotland did not have One Day International (ODI) status at the time of the tournament, matches involving them did not have ODI status and was considered as List-A matches.

Netherlands won both of its round-robin matches to claim its first title. Similar to earlier editions, no final was played. Netherlands' Helmien Rambaldo and Esther Lanser led the tournament in runs and wickets, respectively. All the matches were played at Sportpark Maarschalkerweerd, Utrecht.

== Squads ==
| Ireland | Netherlands | Scotland |
|---|---|---|
| Isobel Joyce (c); Laura Boylan; Laura Cullen; Laura Delany; Emma Flanagan; Julie van de Flier; Kim Garth; Shauna Kavanagh; Amy Kenealy; Louise McCarthy; Rebecca Rolfe; Elena Tice; Mary Waldron (wk) | Helmien Rambaldo (c); Leonie Bennett; Laura Brouwers; Denise van Deventer; Maxime Entrop; Carlijn de Groot; Evelien Gerrits; Jolet Hartenhof; Esther de Lange; Esther Lanser; Caroline Salomons; Miranda Veringmeier; Violet Wattenberg(wk) | Kari Anderson (c); Charlotte Bascombe; Priyanaz Chatterji; Abbi Aitken-Drummond; Samantha Haggo; Lorna Jack (wk); Leigh Kasperek; Diane Pedgrift; Sahar Aslam; Catherine Smaill; Fiona Urquhart; Lois Isla Wilkinson; Kathryn White |

== Points table ==
| Team | Pld | W | L | T | NR | Pts |
|---|---|---|---|---|---|---|
| Netherlands | 2 | 2 | 0 | 0 | 0 | 4 |
| Ireland | 2 | 1 | 1 | 0 | 0 | 2 |
| Scotland | 2 | 0 | 2 | 0 | 0 | 0 |

Source: ESPNCricinfo

== Fixtures ==
17 August 2011
Scorecard

| Ireland; 116 (47.5 overs) | v | Netherlands; 117/8 (48 overs) |
| Amy Kenealy 21 (32)*; Esther Lanser 2/13 (10 overs) | | Helmien Rambaldo 38 (94); Amy Kenealy 3/17 (10 overs) |

Netherlands won by 2 wickets
Sportpark Maarschalkerweerd,Utrecht
Umpires: Charlie McElwee (Ire) and Richard Smith (Ire)

- Netherlands won the toss and elected to bowl.
- Elena Tice, Laura Boylan (Ire) and Leonie Bennett (Ned) made their WODI debut.

18 August 2011
Scorecard

| Ireland; 241/6 (50 overs) | v | Scotland; 123/8 (39 overs) |
| Isobel Joyce 85 (91); Kathryn White 1/32 (10 overs) | | Kari Anderson 43 (97)*; Kim Garth 1/12 (7 overs) |

Ireland won by 90 runs (DLS method)
Sportpark Maarschalkerweerd,Utrecht
Umpires: Charlie McElwee (Ire) and Alex Dowdalls (Sco)

- Scotland won the toss and elected to bowl.
- Scotland were set a revised target of 214 runs from 39 overs due to rain.

19 August 2011
Scorecard

| Netherlands; 246/3 (50 overs) | v | Scotland; 152 (48.5 overs) |
| Helmien Rambaldo 106 (132)*; Leigh Kasperek 1/43 (10 overs) | | Leigh Kasperek 40 (93); Evelien Gerrits 2/24 (9 overs) |

Netherlands won by 94 runs
Sportpark Maarschalkerweerd,Utrecht
Umpires: Charlie McElwee (Ire) and Alex Dowdalls (Sco)

- Netherlands won the toss and elected to bat.

== Statistics ==
=== Most runs ===
| Player | Team | Runs | Inns | Avg | Highest | 100s | 50s |
|---|---|---|---|---|---|---|---|
| Helmien Rambaldo | Netherlands | 144 | 2 | 144.00 | 106* | 0 | 1 |
| Isobel Joyce | Ireland | 89 | 2 | 44.50 | 85 | 1 | 0 |
| Caroline Salomons | Netherlands | 83 | 2 | 41.50 | 71 | 1 | 0 |

Source: ESPNCricinfo

=== Most wickets ===
| Player | Team | Overs | Wkts | Ave | SR | Econ | BBI |
|---|---|---|---|---|---|---|---|
| Esther Lanser | Netherlands | 20.0 | 4 | 10.25 | 30.00 | 2.05 | 2/13 |
| Esther de Lange | Netherlands | 20.0 | 4 | 15.50 | 30.00 | 3.10 | 2/31 |
| Amy Kenealy | Ireland | 12.0 | 3 | 8.00 | 28.00 | 1.71 | 3/17 |

Source: ESPNCricinfo
