= 2010 Women's European Cricket Championship =

- Dates: 9 – 12 August 2010
- Administrator(s): European Cricket Council
- Cricket format: List A, One Day International
- Tournament format(s): Round-robin
- Host(s): Scotland
- Champions: ECB Development XI (1st title)
- Participants: 1
- Matches: 8
- Most runs: Fran Wilson (164)
- Most wickets: kathryn Doherty (6)

The 2010 Women's European Cricket Championship was an international cricket tournament held in Stirling, Scotland from 9 to 12 August 2010. It was the eighth edition of the Women's European Championship. As Scotland did not have One Day International (ODI) status at the time of the tournament, matches involving them did not have ODI status and was considered as List-A matches.

In this edition, four teams participated including the hosts, Ireland, the Netherlands, and England. England was represented by an ECB Development Squad and matches involving them was laso did not have ODI status. There is no final. Instead the group topper was declared as champions. ECB Development XI, Netherlands and Ireland all finished on 4 points with 2 wins and 1 loss. However, ECB Development XI was declared as winner due to better Net run-rate (NRR) and Netherlands finished as runners-up.

ECB Development XI's Fran Wilson and Kathryn Doherty led the tournament in runs and wickets, respectively. All the matches were played at the two grounds of New Williamfield Oval.

== Squads ==
ECB Development XI	Ireland	Netherlands	Scotland
Jo Cook (c); Isabelle Westbury (vc); Georgia Adams; Amara Carr; Deanna Cooper; Cath Dalton (wk); Kathryn Doherty; Alex Hartley; Beth Langston; Beth MacGregor; Alice Macleod; Lucy Maxwell; Hannah Phelps; Fran Wilson	Heather Whelan (c); Isobel Joyce (vc); Emma Beamish; Laura Delany; Kim Garth; Sinead Lyons; Louise McCarthy; Carole McGuire; Ciara Metcalfe; Eimear Richardson; Melissa Scott-Hayward; Clare Shillington; Mary Waldron (wk); Jill Whelan	Helmien Rambaldo (c); Marloes Braat; Laura Brouwers; Denise van Deventer; Carlijn de Groot; Mandy Kornet; Esther de Lange; Esther Lanser; Marijn Nijman; Caroline Salomons; Annemarie Tanke; Miranda Veringmeier; Violet Wattenberg(wk)	Kari Anderson (c); Charlotte Bascombe (vc); Abbi Aitken-Drummond; Fiona Campbell; Lynne Dickson; Samantha Haggo; Lorna Jack (wk); Leigh Kasperek; Elizabeth Priddle; Catherine Smaill; Caroline Sweetman; Catherine Tams; Nadia Wheeler; Kathryn White

== Points table ==
Team	Pld	W	L	T	NR	Pts	NRR
ECB Development XI	3	2	1	0	0	4	1.691
Netherlands	3	2	1	0	0	4	0.201
Ireland	3	2	1	0	0	4	0.016
Scotland	3	0	3	0	0	0	-1.851

Source: ESPNCricinfo

== Fixtures ==
9 August 2010
Scorecard

ECB Ddevelopment XI; 244 (49.5 overs)	v	Netherlands; 245/4 (46.3 overs)
Beth MacGregor 89 (108); Marloes Braat 3/24 (9.5 overs)		Caroline Salomons 100 (98)*; Kathryn Doherty 2/42 (7 overs)

Netherlands won by 6 wickets
New Williamfield No 2 Oval,Sterling
Umpires: Alan Neil (Ire) and Brian Papworth (Sco)

- ECB Development XI won the toss and elected to bat.

9 August 2010
Scorecard

Scotland; 160/4 (50 overs)	v	Ireland; 161/5 (36.4 overs)
Kari Anderson 86 (132)*; Heather Whelan 1/25 (9 overs)		Eimear Richardson 66 (100); Abbi Aitken-Drummond 3/38 (8 overs)

Ireland won by 5 wickets
New Williamfield No 1 Oval,Sterling
Umpires: Bart Hartong (Ned) and Martin Gray (Eng)

- Ireland won the toss and elected to field.

11 August 2010
Scorecard

Netherlands; 125/9 (50 overs)	v	Ireland; 126/7 (39.1 overs)
Helmien Rambaldo 22 (53); Louise McCarthy 2/6 (5 overs)		Isobel Joyce 36 (46)*; Marloes Braat 2/30 (10 overs)

Ireland won by 3 wickets
New Williamfield No 1 Oval,Sterling
Umpires: Martin Gray (Eng) and Brian Papworth (Sco)

- Ireland won the toss and elected to field.
- Esther Lanser and Mariska Kornet (Ned) made their WODI debut.

11 August 2010
Scorecard

Scotland; 115 (47.2 overs)	v	ECB Development XI; 117/1 (19.5 overs)
Kathryn White 23 (39); Kathryn Doherty 3/15 (8 overs)		Fran Wilson 53 (58)*

ECB Development XI won by 9 wickets
New Williamfield No 2 Oval,Sterling
Umpires: Alan Neil (Ire) and Bart Hartong (Ned)

- ECB Development XI won the toss and elected to bat.

12 August 2010
Scorecard

Ireland; 105 (44.4 overs)	v	ECB Development XI; 126/7 (39.1 overs)
Laura Delany 36 (110); Alex Hartley 3/8 (5 overs)		Alice Macleod 42 (64)*; Eimear Richardson 2/24 (6 overs)

ECB Development XI won by 7 wickets
New Williamfield No 1 Oval,Sterling
Umpires: Bart Hartong (Ned) and Brian Papworth (Sco)

- Ireland won the toss and elected to bat.

12 August 2010
Scorecard

Netherlands; 250/4 (50 overs)	v	Scotland; 191/8 (50 overs)
Helmien Rambaldo 93 (131)*; Abbi Aitken-Drummond 1/39 (10 overs)		Catherine Smaill 38 (61); Esther de Lange 3/39 (10 overs)

Netherlands won by 59 runs.
New Williamfield No 2 Oval,Sterling
Umpires: Alan Neil (Ire) and Martin Gray (Eng)

- Netherlands won the toss and elected to bat.

== Statistics ==
=== Most runs ===
Player	Team	Runs	Inns	Avg	Highest	100s	50s
Fran Wilson	England	164	3	82.00	76	0	2
Helmien Rambaldo	Netherlands	159	3	79.50	93*	0	1
Marijn Nijman	Netherlands	123	3	41.00	78	0	1
Kari Anderson	Scotland	120	3	60.00	86*	0	1
Caroline Salomons	Netherlands	104	3	52.00	100*	1	0

Source: ESPNCricinfo

=== Most wickets ===
Player	Team	Overs	Wkts	Ave	SR	Econ	BBI
Kathryn Doherty	England	22.0	6	12.50	22.00	3.40	3/15
Esther de Lange	Netherlands	27.0	6	19.16	27.00	4.25	3/39
Marloes Braat	Netherlands	29.5	5	17.20	35.80	2.88	3/24
Abbi Aitken-Drummond	Scotland	20.0	4	30.00	21.25	4.25	3/38
Mariska Kornet	Netherlands	27.1	4	40.75	32.50	4.78	2/40

Source: ESPNCricinfo
