= 2009 Women's European Cricket Championship =

- Dates: 3 – 5 August 2009
- Administrator: European Cricket Council
- Cricket format: List A, One Day International
- Tournament format: Round-robin
- Host: Ireland
- Champions: Ireland (2nd title)
- Participants: 3
- Matches: 3
- Most runs: (Netherlands) Violet Wattenberg (121)
- Most wickets: (Ireland) Eimear Richardson (9)

The 2009 Women's European Cricket Championship was an international cricket tournament held in Ireland from 3 to 5 August 2009. It was the seventh edition of the Women's European Championship. As Scotland did not have One Day International (ODI) status at the time of the tournament, matches involving them did not have ODI status and was considered as List-A matches.

In this edition, three teams participated including the hosts, Ireland, the Netherlands, and Scotland. Ireland won both of its round-robin matches to claim its second title. Similar to earlier editions, no final was played, although both Netherlands and Ireland were undefeated going into their final match, making that a de facto final. Netherlands' Violet Wattenberg and Ireland's Eimear Richardson led the tournament in runs and wickets, respectively. The first two matches were played at Clontarf Cricket Club Ground, Dublin and last match took place in The Vineyard, Dublin.

== Squads ==
Ireland	Netherlands	Scotland
Heather Whelan (c); Emma Beamish; Valmai Gee (wk); Marianne Herbert; Cecelia Joyce; Isobel Joyce; Amy Kenealy; Ciara Metcalfe; Eimear Richardson; Melissa Scott-Hayward; Clare Shillington; Jill Whelan	Helmien Rambaldo (c); Marloes Braat; Denise van Deventer; Evelien Gerrits; Jolet Hartenhof; Mandy Kornet; Alarda Mol; Marijn Nijman; Cheraldine Oudolf; Annemarie Tanke; Miranda Veringmeier; Violet Wattenberg(wk)	Kari Anderson (c); Charlotte Bascombe (wk); Abbi Aitken-Drummond; Lynne Dickson; Samantha Haggo; Lorna Jack; Leigh Kasperek; Ali Ramsey; Sahar Aslam; Catherine Small; Caroline Sweetman; Fiona Urquhart; Kathryn White

== Points table ==
Team	Pld	W	L	T	NR	Pts
Ireland	2	2	0	0	0	4
Netherlands	2	1	1	0	0	2
Scotland	2	0	2	0	0	0

Source: ESPNCricinfo

== Fixtures ==
3 August 2009
Scorecard

Scotland; 85 (47.5 overs)	v	Ireland; 86/0 (14.3 overs)
Kari Anderson 29 (68); Eimear Richardson 4/10 (8 overs)		Cecelia Joyce 41 (43)*

Ireland won by 10 wickets
Clontarf Cricket Club Ground, Dublin
Umpires: Sanjeev Kad (Fin) and Ingeborg Bevers (Ned)
Player of the match: Eimear Richardson (IRE)

- Ireland won the toss and elected to bowl.

4 August 2021
Scorecard

Scotland; 228/7 (50 overs)	v	Netherlands; 229/7 (45 overs)
Kari Anderson 63 (101); Mandy Kornet 2/28 (10 overs)		Violet Wattenberg 87 (110)*; Kathryn White 1/38 (8 overs)

Netherlands won by 3 wickets
Clontarf Cricket Club Ground, Dublin
Umpires: Lee Goldsmith (Ire) and Sanjeev Kad (Fin)
Player of the match: Violet Wattenberg (NED)

- Netherlands won the toss and elected to bowl.

5 August 2021
Scorecard

Netherlands; 68 (32.4 overs)	v	Ireland; 71/0 (13.2 overs)
Violet Wattenberg 34 (77); Eimear Richardson 5/13 (9.4 overs)		Cecelia Joyce 35 (47)*

Ireland won by 10 wickets
The Vineyard, Dublin
Umpires: Lee Goldsmith (Ire) and Ingeborg Bevers (Ned)
Player of the match: Eimear Richardson (IRE)

- Netherlands won the toss and elected to bat.
- Evelien Gerrits, Alarda Mol (Ned) and Valmai Gee (Ire) made their WODI debut.

== Statistics ==
=== Most runs ===
The top five run scorers (total runs) are included in this table.

Player	Team	Runs	Inns	Avg	Highest	100s	50s
Violet Wattenberg	Netherlands	121	2	121.00	87*	0	1
Kari Anderson	Scotland	92	2	46.00	63	0	1
Cecelia Joyce	Ireland	76	2	-	41*	0	0
Leigh Kasperek	Scotland	68	2	34.00	58	0	1
Eimear Richardson	Ireland	61	2	-	33*	0	0

Source: ESPNCricinfo

=== Most wickets ===
The top five wicket takers are listed in this table, listed by wickets taken and then by bowling average.

Player	Team	Overs	Wkts	Ave	SR	Econ	BBI
Eimear Richardson	Ireland	17.4	9	2.55	11.77	1.30	5/13
Ciara Metcalfe	Ireland	9.0	4	5.25	13.50	2.33	4/21
Amy Kenealy	Ireland	8.0	2	3.00	24.00	0.75	2/6
Heather Whelan	Ireland	14.5	2	14.00	44.50	1.88	2/13
Mandy Kornet	Netherlands	13.0	2	23.50	39.00	3.61	2/28

Source: ESPNCricinfo
