= 2011 Women's Quadrangular Series =

- Cricket format: T20I
- Host: Sri Lanka
- Champions: Pakistan
- Runners-up: Netherlands
- Participants: 4
- Matches: 4
- Most runs: Javeria Khan (Pak) (29)
- Most wickets: Chamani Seneviratna (SL) (3); Evelien Gerrits (Net) (3)

The 2011 Women's Quadrangular Series were two quadrangular series that took place in Sri Lanka in April 2011. The four teams competing were Ireland, the Netherlands, Pakistan and Sri Lanka. The teams first played in a T20I series, consisting of semi-finals and a final, which was won by Pakistan. They then played in a ODI round-robin series, which was again won by Pakistan. Before the series started, Sri Lanka and Pakistan also faced each other in a one-off ODI, which was also won by Pakistan.

== Squads ==
Sri Lanka	Ireland	Netherlands	Pakistan
Dilani Manodara (c) (wk); Chamari Atapattu; Suwini de Alwis; Sandamali Dolawatte; Eshani Lokusuriyage; Chamari Polgampola; Lasanthi Madushani; Yasoda Mendis; Udeshika Prabodhani; Deepika Rasangika; Oshadi Ranasinghe (withdrawn); Sharina Ravikumar; Maduri Samuddika; Chamani Seneviratna; Shashikala Siriwardene (withdrawn); Sripali Weerakkody	Ciara Metcalfe (c); Laura Cullen; Laura Delany; Emma Flanagan; Kim Garth; Aisling Gill; Shauna Kavanagh; Amy Kenealy; Louise McCarthy; Eimear Richardson; Rebecca Rolfe; Clare Shillington; Mary Waldron (wk)	Helmien Rambaldo (c); Marloes Braat; Laura Brouwers; Carlijn de Groot; Esther de Lange; Evelien Gerrits; Denise van Deventer; Esther Lanser; Alarda Mol; Marijn Nijman; Denise Prins; Miranda Veringmeier; Violet Wattenberg (wk)	Sana Mir (c); Nain Abidi; Sidra Ameen; Nida Dar; Batool Fatima (wk); Sana Gulzar; Kainat Imtiaz; Asmavia Iqbal; Marina Iqbal; Qanita Jalil; Masooma Junaid; Nahida Khan; Javeria Khan; Bismah Maroof; Sadia Yousuf

== Only ODI: Sri Lanka v Pakistan ==
21 April 2011
Scorecard

Sri Lanka; 153 (49.3 overs)	v	Pakistan; 154/8 (48.2 overs)
Eshani Lokusuriyage 35 (52); Qanita Jalil 3/20 (9 overs)		Javeria Khan 63* (118); Eshani Lokusuriyage 3/23 (6.2 overs)

Pakistan Women won by 2 wickets
Singhalese Sports Club Cricket Ground, Colombo
Umpires: Ranmore Martinesz (SL) and Tyron Wijewardene (SL)

- Sri Lanka Women won the toss and elected to bat.
- Masooma Junaid (Pak) made her WODI debut.

== T20 Quadrangular Series ==
=== Semi-finals ===
24 April 2011
Scorecard

Ireland; 75/7 (20 overs)	v	Pakistan; 37/0 (2.7 overs)
Eimear Richardson 17 (19); Qanita Jalil 2/9 (4 overs)		Nida Dar 20* (24)

Pakistan Women won by 15 runs (D/L)
Colts Cricket Club Ground, Colombo
Umpires: Grashan Liyanage (SL) and SH Sarathkumara (SL)

- Pakistan Women won the toss and elected to field.
- When play was halted due to rain, Pakistan Women needed to have scored 23 runs to win.
- Laura Cullen, Emma Flanagan, Shauna Kavanagh, Rebecca Rolfe (Ire), Sidra Ameen and Masooma Junaid (Pak) all made their WT20I debuts.

24 April 2011
Scorecard

Netherlands; 46/8 (13 overs)	v	Sri Lanka; 14/0 (1 over)
Miranda Veringmeier 9 (8); Chamani Seneviratna 3/8 (3 overs)		Chamari Atapattu 12* (3)

No result (Netherlands Women won on toss of a coin)
Singhalese Sports Club Cricket Ground, Colombo
Umpires: Gamini Dissanayake (SL) and Prageeth Rambukwella (SL)

- Netherlands Women won the toss and elected to bat.
- Match reduced to 13 overs per side due to rain.
- Yasoda Mendis (SL) made her WT20I debut.

=== Third-Place play-off ===
24 April 2011
Scorecard

Sri Lanka	v	Ireland

Match Abandoned
Singhalese Sports Club Cricket Ground, Colombo
Umpires: Gamini Dissanayake (SL) and Prageeth Rambukwella (SL)

- No toss.
- No play possible due to rain.

=== Final ===
24 April 2011
Scorecard

Pakistan; 53/7 (9 overs)	v	Netherlands; 41/1 (9 over)
Javeria Khan 14 (8); Evelien Gerrits 3/13 (2 overs)		Miranda Veringmeier 14 (26); Sana Mir 1/4 (2 overs)

Pakistan Women won by 12 runs
Colts Cricket Club Ground, Colombo
Umpires: Grashan Liyanage (SL) and SH Sarathkumara (SL)

- Netherlands Women won the toss and elected to field.
- Match reduced to 9 overs per side due to rain.

== ODI Quadrangular Series ==
=== Points table ===
Note: P = Played, W = Wins, L = Losses, NR = No Results, Pts = Points, NRR = Net run rate.

Pos	Team	P	W	L	NR	Pts	NRR
1	Pakistan	3	2	0	1	5	+0.712
2	Sri Lanka	3	1	1	1	3	+2.172
3	Ireland	3	1	1	1	3	−0.837
4	Netherlands	3	0	2	0	1	−2.763

- Source: ESPNCricinfo

=== Fixtures ===
26 April 2011
Scorecard

Ireland; 113 (28 overs)	v	Netherlands; 112 (27.3 overs)
Shauna Kavanagh 17 (37); Esther de Lange 3/16 (6 overs)		Marijn Nijman 21 (22); Ciara Metcalfe 4/27 (6 overs)

Ireland Women won by 1 run
Colts Cricket Club Ground, Colombo
Umpires: Ranmore Martinesz (SL) and Rohita Kottahachchi (SL)

- Netherlands Women won the toss and elected to field.
- Match reduced to 28 overs per side due to rain.
- Points: Ireland Women 2, Netherlands Women 0
- Laura Cullen, Emma Flanagan, Shauna Kavanagh and Rebecca Rolfe (Ire) all made their WODI debuts.

26 April 2011
Scorecard

Sri Lanka; 68 (24.2 overs)	v	Pakistan; 69/8 (27 overs)
Eshani Lokusuriyage 23* (23); Qanita Jalil 2/7 (5 overs)		Bismah Maroof 22 (48); Suwini de Alwis 2/8 (4 overs)

Pakistan Women won by 2 wickets
Paikiasothy Saravanamuttu Stadium, Colombo
Umpires: Lyndon Hannibal (SL) and Tyron Wijewardene (SL)

- Pakistan Women won the toss and elected to field.
- Match reduced to 27 overs per side due to rain.
- Points: Pakistan Women 2, Sri Lanka Women 0
- Sidra Ameen (Pak) and Yasoda Mendis (SL) both made their WODI debuts.

28 April 2011
Scorecard

Sri Lanka; 251/5 (48 overs)	v	Ireland
Chamari Atapattu 111 (110); Laura Cullen 3/51 (7 overs)

No result
Paikiasothy Saravanamuttu Stadium, Colombo
Umpires: Lyndon Hannibal (SL) and Rohitha Kottahachchi (SL)

- Ireland Women won the toss and elected to field.
- Match reduced to 48 overs per side due to rain.
- No further play possible due to rain.
- Points: Ireland Women 1, Sri Lanka Women 1
- Maduri Samuddika (SL) made her WODI debut.

28 April 2011
Scorecard

Netherlands; 68/6 (20 overs)	v	Pakistan
Esther Lanser 18 (39); Sadia Yousuf 2/14 (4 overs)

No result
Nondescripts Cricket Club Ground, Colombo
Umpires: Gamini Dissanayake (SL) and Graham Liyanage (SL)

- Pakistan Women won the toss and elected to field.
- Match reduced to 31 overs per side due to rain.
- Match further reduced to 20 overs per side due to rain at 16 overs.
- No further play possible due to rain.
- Points: Netherlands Women 1, Pakistan Women 1
- Rabiya Shah (Pak) made her WODI debut.

29 April 2011
Scorecard

Ireland; 68 (22.1 overs)	v	Pakistan; 70/1 (13.3 overs)
Laura Delany 20 (48); Bismah Maroof 4/7 (4.1 overs)		Javeria Khan 47* (50); Amy Kenealy 1/12 (3 overs)

Pakistan Women won by 9 wickets
Thurstan College Ground, Colombo
Umpires: Prageeth Rambukwella (SL) and Tyron Wijewardene (SL)

- Pakistan Women won the toss and elected to field.
- Match reduced to 23 overs per side due to rain.
- Points: Pakistan Women 2, Ireland Women 0
- Julie van der Flier (Ire) made her WODI debut.

29 April 2011
Scorecard

Netherlands; 66 (38 overs)	v	Sri Lanka; 72/2 (8.4 overs)
Miranda Veringmeier 19 (26); Sharina Ravikumar 4/14 (10 overs)		Chamari Atapattu 32 (28); Esther de Lange 1/11 (1.4 overs)

Sri Lanka Women won by 8 wickets
Nondescripts Cricket Club Ground, Colombo
Umpires: Ranmore Martinesz (SL) and SH Sarathkumara (SL)

- Sri Lanka Women won the toss and elected to field.
- Points: Sri Lanka Women 2, Netherlands Women 0
