= Ireland women's cricket team in the Netherlands in 2011 =

| | Netherlands | Ireland |
- Date: 20 August 2011
| Captains | Helmien Rambaldo | Isobel Joyce |

Twenty20 International series
- Results: Ireland won the 2-match series 2–0
| Most runs | Esther Lanser (77) | Cecelia Joyce (64) |
| Most wickets | Esther de Lange (2) | Kim Garth (3); Elena Tice (3); Isobel Joyce (3) |

The Ireland women's cricket team toured the Netherlands in August 2011. They played the Netherlands in 2 Twenty20 Internationals, winning the series 2–0. The series followed the 2011 Women's European Championship, which was also held in the Netherlands.

== Squads ==
| Netherlands | Ireland |
|---|---|
| Helmien Rambaldo (c); Leonie Bennett; Laura Brouwers; Carlijn de Groot; Esther de Lange; Maxime Entrop; Evelien Gerrits; Denise van Deventer; Jolet Hartenhof; Esther Lanser; Carolien Salomons; Miranda Veringmeier; Violet Wattenberg (wk) | Isobel Joyce (c); Laura Boylan; Laura Cullen; Laura Delany; Emma Flanagan; Kim Garth; Cecelia Joyce (wk); Shauna Kavanagh; Amy Kenealy; Louise McCarthy; Eimear Richardson; Rebecca Rolfe; Clare Shillington; Elena Tice; Julie van der Flier; Mary Waldron; Jill Whelan |

== WT20I Series ==
=== 1st T20I ===
20 August 2011
Scorecard

| Netherlands; 106/8 (20 overs) | v | Ireland; 107/2 (17.2 overs) |
| Esther Lanser 55 (48); Kim Garth 3/6 (4 overs) | | Isobel Joyce 48* (43); Laura Brouwers 1/19 (3 overs) |

Ireland Women won by 8 wickets
Sportpark Maarschalkerweerd, Utrecht
Umpires: Ashraf Din (Net) and Bart Hartong (Net)

- Ireland Women won the toss and elected to field.

=== 2nd T20I ===
20 August 2011
Scorecard

| Ireland; 115/3 (20 overs) | v | Netherlands; 102/7 (20 overs) |
| Clare Shillington 33 (33); Esther Lanser 1/21 (4 overs) | | Violet Wattenberg 25 (44); Elena Tice 3/12 (3 overs) |

Ireland Women won by 13 runs
Sportpark Maarschalkerweerd, Utrecht
Umpires: Ashraf Din (Net) and Bart Hartong (Net)

- Ireland Women won the toss and elected to bat.
