= 2008 Women's Cricket World Cup Qualifier =

2008 Women's World Cup Qualifier
- Dates: 18 – 24 February 2008
- Administrator: International Cricket Council
- Cricket format: 50 overs (ODI)
- Host: South Africa
- Champions: South Africa (1st title)
- Participants: 8
- Matches: 20
- Player of the series: (Netherlands) Caroline de Fouw (Pakistan) Sana Mir
- Most runs: (Ireland) Cecelia Joyce (172)
- Most wickets: (South Africa) Sunette Loubser (12)

The 2008 Women's Cricket World Cup Qualifier was an eight-team tournament held in South Africa in February 2008 to decide the final two qualifiers for the 2009 Women's Cricket World Cup. South Africa and Pakistan qualified, with the hosts winning in the final against Pakistan.

== Pre-tournament ==
The 2007 tournament was due to be played in Lahore, Pakistan in November 2007 but was postponed owing to the state of emergency in Pakistan, and subsequently shifted to South Africa, where it was played in February 2008. The eight participating teams were divided into two groups. Group A featured South Africa, Bermuda, Papua New Guinea, Netherlands and Group B featured Ireland, Pakistan, Zimbabwe and Scotland.

== Regional qualification ==
Unlike in 2003, four teams had to qualify for the tournament. Ireland and South Africa qualified automatically as they had played in the previous World Cup, the Netherlands and Scotland qualified automatically as the only remaining European teams.

=== Africa ===
The African leg of qualifying was a four-team round-robin tournament played in Nairobi, Kenya in December 2006. Participating teams were Kenya, Tanzania, Uganda and Zimbabwe. Zimbabwe won all three of their games and qualified for the main tournament.

=== Americas ===
The Americas leg of qualifying was a three-match series between Bermuda and Canada, played at Beacon Hill Park in Victoria, British Columbia, Canada in September 2006. Canada won the first match, but Bermuda came back to win the remaining two and thus qualify for the main tournament.

=== Asia ===
The Asian leg of qualifying was a three-match series between Pakistan and Hong Kong, played in Lahore, Pakistan in September 2006. Pakistan won all three matches, two by over 200 runs, thus qualifying for the main tournament.

=== East-Asia/Pacific ===
The East-Asia/Pacific leg of qualifying was a three match series between Japan and Papua New Guinea, played in Port Moresby, Papua New Guinea in September 2006. Papua New Guinea won all three matches, thus qualifying for the main tournament.

=== Europe ===
Whilst Ireland, the Netherlands and Scotland are all already in the main tournament, all three teams will play against an England Development XI in the Women's European Championship in 2007, with the final group of the Netherlands and Scotland dependent on their position in this tournament.

== Teams ==
| Bermuda | Ireland | Netherlands | Pakistan |
|---|---|---|---|
| Linda Mienzer (c); Suzette Albouy; Stacy Babb; Chevonne Furbert; Maryellen Jackson; Nicole Jones; Terry-Lynn Paynter; Reuna Richardson; Stacey Simmons; Arkeita Smith; Rickelle Smith; Charlene Thompson; Shunta Todd; Wendy Woodley | Heather Whelan (c); Caitriona Beggs; Jean Carroll; Nicola Coffey; Marianne Herbert; Cecelia Joyce; Isobel Joyce; Anne Linehan; Ciara Metcalfe; Elaine Nolan; Eimear Richardson; Melissa Scott-Hayward; Clare Shillington; Jill Whelan | Helmien Rambaldo (c); Marloes Braat; Caroline de Fouw; Lotte Egging; Jolet Hartenhof; Leonie Hoitink; Mandy Kornet; Marijn Nijman; Cheraldine Oudolf; Jacqueline Pashley; Denise Prins; Annemarie Tanke; Pauline te Beest; Violet Wattenberg | Urooj Mumtaz (c); Sajjida Shah (vc); Asmavia Iqbal; Batool Fatima; Bismah Maroof; Nain Abidi; Nida Dar; Qanita Jalil; Sabahat Rasheed; Sadia Yousuf; Sana Javed; Sana Mir; Sumaiya Siddiqi; Tasqeen Qadeer |
| Papua New Guinea | Scotland | South Africa | Zimbabwe |
| Kune Amini (c); Koita Atai; Boni David; Konio Heagi; Mebo Ipi; Nao Kamea; Karo Lumis; Gari Mea; Bede Morea; Norma Ovasuru; Lucy Ovia; Ura Rigana; Henao Sam; Pauke Siaka | Fiona Urquhart (c); Abbi Aitken; Kari Anderson; Sahar Aslam; Charlotte Bascombe; Fiona Campbell; Charlotte Farr; Leigh Kasperek; Vari Maxwell; Diane Pedgrift; Paula Ritchie; Catherine Smaill; Caroline Sweetman; Kathryn White | Cri-zelda Brits (c); Claire Terblanche (vc); Olivia Anderson; Susan Benade; Trisha Chetty; Dinesha Devnarain; Shandre Fritz; Ashlyn Kilowan; Marcia Letsoalo; Sunette Loubser; Annelie Minny; Alicia Smith; Daleen Terblanche; Charlize van der Westhuizen | Julia Chibhabha (c); Yvonne Rainsford; Christabel Chatonzwa; Ruvarashe Chinyemba; Emily Jinjika; Chipo Kamchetsa; Susan Kudzibatira; Precious Marange; Sharne Mayers; Thandolwenkosi Mlilo; Sinikiwe Mpofu; Chipo Mugeri; Nonhlanhla Nyathi; Sharyce Saili |

== First round ==
=== Group A ===
| Team | Pld | W | L | T | NR | Pts |
|---|---|---|---|---|---|---|
| South Africa | 3 | 3 | 0 | 0 | 0 | 6 |
| Netherlands | 3 | 2 | 1 | 0 | 0 | 4 |
| Papua New Guinea | 3 | 1 | 2 | 0 | 0 | 2 |
| Bermuda | 3 | 0 | 0 | 3 | 0 | 0 |

18 February
(scorecard)

| Papua New Guinea; 102 (37.1 overs) | v | Netherlands; 103/2 (28.2 overs) |
| Kune Amini 32 (65); Caroline de Fouw 3/14 (10.0) | | Pauline te Beest 34* (58); Konio Heagi 1/11 (5.0) |

Netherlands won by 8 wickets
Paul Roos Gymnasium, Stellenbosch
Umpires: D van Kerwel and G von Willingh

18 February
(scorecard)

| Bermuda; 13 (18.0 overs) | v | South Africa; 15/0 (0.4 overs) |
| Maryellen Jackson 1 (7); Rickelle Smith 1 (14); Linda Mienzer 1 (48); Sunette Loubser 6/3 (4.0) | | Olivia Anderson 4 (4) |

South Africa won by 10 wickets
Stellenbosch University Ground No. 2, Stellenbosch
Umpires: R Birkenstock and M Muller

19 February
(scorecard)

| Netherlands; 281/8 (50.0 overs) | v | Bermuda; 85 (36.5 overs) |
| Helmien Rambaldo 59 (55); Maryellen Jackson 3/46 (10.0) | | Maryellen Jackson 26 (56); Annemarie Tanke 3/18 (7.0) |

Netherlands won by 196 runs
Paul Roos Gymnasium, Stellenbosch
Umpires: AM Muller and I van Schoor

19 February
(scorecard)

| South Africa; 298/7 (50.0 overs) | v | Papua New Guinea; 28 (17.2 overs) |
| Olivia Anderson 91 (119); Norma Ovasuru 2/39 (6.0) | | Boni David 7 (30); Ashlyn Kilowan 4/14 (5.0) |

South Africa won by 270 runs
Van der Stel Cricket Club Ground, Stellenbosch
Umpires: JA Hanekom and GA von Willingh

21 February
(scorecard)

| Papua New Guinea; 223/9 (50.0 overs) | v | Bermuda; 44 (30.2 overs) |
| Kune Amini 65 (102); Chevonne Furbert 3/50 (10.0) | | Maryellen Jackson 8 (27); Karo Lumis 3/10 (8.0); Mebo Ipi 3/11 (6.2) |

Papua New Guinea won by 179 runs
Stellenbosch University Ground No. 2, Stellenbosch
Umpires: D van Kerwel and RM White

21 February
Women ODI 626

| South Africa; 277/4 (50.0 overs) | v | Netherlands; 50 (41.4 overs) |
| Cri-zelda Brits 107* (130); Jolet Hartenhof 2/46 (10.0) | | Helmien Rambaldo 19 (86); Ashlyn Kilowan 3/8 (8.0) |

South Africa won by 227 runs
Stellenbosch University Ground No. 1, Stellenbosch
Umpires: RN Birkenstock and AM Muller

=== Group B ===
| Team | Pld | W | L | T | NR | Pts |
|---|---|---|---|---|---|---|
| Pakistan | 3 | 3 | 0 | 0 | 0 | 6 |
| Ireland | 3 | 2 | 1 | 0 | 0 | 4 |
| Zimbabwe | 3 | 1 | 2 | 0 | 0 | 2 |
| Scotland | 3 | 0 | 3 | 0 | 0 | 0 |

18 February
Women ODI 625

| Pakistan; 165/9 (50.0 overs) | v | Ireland; 108 (43.3 overs) |
| Tasqeen Qadeer 30 (65); Ciara Metcalfe 2/27 (10.0) | | Cecelia Joyce 36 (92); Sana Mir 2/17 (9.0) |

Pakistan won by 47 runs
Stellenbosch University Ground No. 1, Stellenbosch
Umpires: JA Hanekom and RM White

18 February
(scorecard)

| Zimbabwe; 147 (39.0 overs) | v | Scotland; 72 (31.2 overs) |
| Yvonne Rainsford 37 (42); Kathryn White 2/5 (8.0) | | Fiona Urquhart 10 (25); Yvonne Rainsford 2/7 (6.0); Emily Jinjika 2/7 (6.0) |

Zimbabwe won by 75 runs
Van der Stel Cricket Club Ground, Stellenbosch
Umpires: MA Karriem and I van Schoor

19 February
(scorecard)

| Scotland; 142/8 (50.0 overs) | v | Ireland; 143/1 (21.5 overs) |
| Kari Anderson 41 (121); Isobel Joyce 3/21 (10.0) | | Isobel Joyce 45 (33); Kari Anderson 1/34 (5.5) |

Ireland won by 9 wickets
Stellenbosch University Ground No. 2, Stellenbosch
Umpires: MA Karriem and RM White

19 February
(scorecard)

| Zimbabwe; 58 (35.3 overs) | v | Pakistan; 59/1 (13.0 overs) |
| Emily Jinjika 9 (37); Urooj Mumtaz 3/14 (7.3); Sana Mir 3/7 (6.0) | | Bismah Maroof 25 (38); Emily Jinjika 1/16 (3.0) |

Pakistan won by 9 wickets
Stellenbosch University Ground No. 1, Stellenbosch
Umpires: RN Birkenstock and D van Kerwel

21 February
(scorecard)

| Ireland; 305/5 (50.0 overs) | v | Zimbabwe; 97 (30.0 overs) |
| Isobel Joyce 70 (63); Julia Chibhabha 2/40 (10.0) | | Emily Jinjika 14 (26); Yvonne Rainsford 14 (30); Isobel Joyce 4/10 (7.0) |

Ireland won by 208 runs
Paul Roos Gymnasium, Stellenbosch
Umpires: JA Hanekom and MA Karriem

21 February
(scorecard)

| Pakistan; 278/8 (50.0 overs) | v | Scotland; 26 (28.3 overs) |
| Sajjida Shah 74 (107); Kari Anderson 5/61 (10.0) | | Charlotte Bascombe 6 (40); Sajjida Shah 3/6 (8.3) |

Pakistan won by 252 runs
Van der Stel Cricket Club Ground, Stellenbosch
Umpires: I van Schoor and GA von Willingh

== Playoffs ==
=== 5th Place Semifinals ===
22 February
(scorecard)

| Zimbabwe; 237/5 (50.0 overs) | v | Bermuda; 112 (49.5 overs) |
| Nonhlanhla Nyathi 54 (97); Terry-Lynn Paynter 1/26 (10.0) | | Terry-Lynn Paynter 25 (28); Yvonne Rainsford 2/7 (6.0) |

Zimbabwe won by 125 runs
Van der Stel Cricket Club Ground, Stellenbosch
Umpires: MA Karriem and RM White

22 February
(scorecard)

| Papua New Guinea; 117 (47.0 overs) | v | Scotland; 118/6 (36.4 overs) |
| Konio Heagi 21 (48); Kari Anderson 2/11 (10.0) | | Kari Anderson 45 (81); Karo Lumis 2/17 (10.0) |

Scotland won by 4 wickets
Paul Roos Gymnasium, Stellenbosch
Umpires: I van Schoor and GA von Willingh

=== 3rd place ===
24 February
Women ODI 630

| Ireland; 237 (49.4 overs) | v | Netherlands; 171/9 (50.0 overs) |
| Cecelia Joyce 65 (96); Caroline de Fouw 3/23 (10.0); Marloes Braat 3/39 (8.4) | | Pauline te Beest 32 (34); Heather Whelan 3/37 (9.0); Ciara Metcalfe 3/21 (10.0) |

Ireland won by 66 runs
Stellenbosch University Ground No. 2, Stellenbosch
Umpires: MA Karriem and RM White

=== 5th Place ===
24 February
(scorecard)

| Zimbabwe; 236/6 (50.0 overs) | v | Scotland; 75 (32.5 overs) |
| Yvonne Rainsford 69 (72); Fiona Campbell 2/44 (7.0) | | Kari Anderson 13 (48); Julia Chibhabha 4/16 (6.0) |

Zimbabwe won by 161 runs
Van der Stel Cricket Club Ground, Stellenbosch
Umpires: I van Schoor and GA von Willingh

=== 7th Place ===
24 February
(scorecard)

| Papua New Guinea; 119 (28.3 overs) | v | Bermuda; 74 (35.0 overs) |
| Norma Ovasuru 29 (40); Terry-Lynn Paynter 4/16 (9.0) | | Terry-Lynn Paynter 32 (43); Norma Ovasuru 4/3 (10.0); Konio Heagi 4/29 (8.0) |

Papua New Guinea won by 45 runs
Bridge House School, Franschhoek
Umpires: I van Schoor and GA von Willingh

== Semi-finals ==
22 February
Women's ODI 627

| Ireland; 107 (47.4 overs) | v | South Africa; 108/3 (27.4 overs) |
| Cecelia Joyce 43 (146); Sunette Loubser 2/12 (10.0) | | Olivia Anderson 46* (89); Isobel Joyce 2/21 (6.4) |

South Africa won by 7 wickets
Stellenbosch University Ground No. 1, Stellenbosch
Umpires: RN Birkenstock and JA Hanekom

22 February
Women's ODI 628

| Pakistan; 162 (45.5 overs) | v | Netherlands; 68 (31.2 overs) |
| Bismah Maroof 45 (77); Lotte Egging 3/23 (5.5) | | Annemarie Tanke 41 (70); Sajjida Shah 3/14 (9.2) |

Pakistan won by 94 runs
Stellenbosch University Ground No. 2, Stellenbosch
Umpires: AM Muller and D van Kerwel

- Lotte Egging (Net) took a hat-trick.

== Final ==
24 February
Women's ODI 631

| Pakistan; 61 (24.3 overs) | v | South Africa; 62/2 (13.4 overs) |
| Tasqeen Qadeer 12 (35); Alicia Smith 5/7 (8.0) | | Susan Benade 26 (30); Asmavia Iqbal 2/20 (4.0) |

South Africa won by 8 wickets
Stellenbosch University Ground No. 1, Stellenbosch
Umpires: RN Birkenstock and AM Muller
