= MEA =

MEA or Mea may refer to:

== Education ==
- Minnesota Education Association
- MEA Engineering College, Perinthalmanna
- Michigan Education Association

== Fictional characters ==
- Mea (Popotan), a maid for three sisters in the visual novel Popotan
- Mea Kurosaki, a transformation weapon in the manga series To Love Ru Darkness
- Mea 3, a representative of planet Eminiar VII in the Star Trek episode "A Taste of Armageddon"

== Organizations ==
- Manx Electricity Authority
- ME Association, a British organization providing information and support on ME/CFS
- Metropolitan Electricity Authority, responsible for supplying the Bangkok Metropolitan Region
- Middle East Airlines, the flag carrier airline of Lebanon
- Municipal Employees' Association, former British trade union

== Politics ==
- Multilateral Environmental Agreement
- Ministry of External Affairs (disambiguation), several

== Science ==
- Mea (moth), a genus of moths
- Mean electrical axis, in electrocardiography
- Means–ends analysis a paradigm for automated problem solving
- Microelectrode array, a device to record or stimulate electrophysiological activity from neurons or other cells
- Millennium Ecosystem Assessment
- Membrane electrode assembly, part of a PEM fuel cell
- Mercaptoethylamine-2 or cysteamine, an organic chemical compound
- Monoethanolamine, an organic chemical compound
- Mind Evolutionary Algorithm in statistics

== Other uses ==
- Mea language
- Malt extract agar, a selective growth medium which is a combination of yeast and mold.
- Metropolitan Employment Area, a type of division of Japan
- Line A (Rome Metro), Metropolitana A
- Minimum en route altitude, the recommended minimum altitude for a segment of an airway
- The Middle East and Africa, a variation of Europe, the Middle East and Africa
- Mughal-e-Azam, an Indian film
- Mass Effect: Andromeda, a 2017 video game

== Persons with the surname ==
- Ivan Della Mea (1940–2009), Italian singer
- Gari Mea (born 1976), Papua New Guinean cricketer
- Lara Della Mea (born 1999), Italian skier
