= Annette Drummond =

Scottish cricketer

Personal information
- Full name: Annette J. Drummond
- Born: 21 October 1984 (age 42); Meigle, Scotland
- Batting: Right-handed
- Bowling: Right-arm off spin
- Relatives: Gordon Drummond (brother); Abbi Aitken-Drummond (wife)

International information
- National side: Scotland (2002–2015)
- ODI debut (cap 15): 21 July 2003 v Netherlands
- Last ODI: 26 July 2003 v Ireland

Career statistics
Competition	ODI
Matches	5
Runs scored	9
Batting average	1.80
100s/50s	0/0
Top score	6
Catches/stumpings	1/–
- Source: Cricinfo, 29 October 2015

Annette J. Drummond (born 21 October 1984) is a Scottish international cricketer who debuted for the Scottish national side in 2002. A right-handed batsman, she has appeared in five of the eight One Day International (ODI) matches that Scotland has played to date.

Drummond was born in Meigle, a rural village in Perthshire, and played her early cricket for Meigle Cricket Club. Her older brother, Gordon Drummond, later captained the national men's team. Drummond herself made her senior debut for Scotland at the age of 17, appearing in matches against Durham (an English county team) and Wales during the 2002 season. Her first international tournament at a senior level was the 2003 IWCC Trophy in the Netherlands, where matches held ODI status. The second-youngest member of the squad, behind only Fiona Urquhart, Drummond played in all five of her team's matches. However, she scored only nine runs from five innings, which included ducks against Ireland and the Netherlands.

The 2003 IWCC Trophy is Scotland's most recent ODI tournament to date, with Drummond being only one of 17 women to have played at that level. Her next international tournament was the 2005 European Championship in Wales, where she was Scotland's equal leading runscorer with Kari Anderson. After that tournament, Drummond took a break from international cricket for several years, not appearing again until the 2014 European Championship in England. She played for Scotland in English domestic competitions in 2014 and 2015, and was selected in the national squad for the 2015 World Twenty Qualifier.

Drummond married fellow Scotland cricketer Abbi Aitken in June 2019.
