= Lanser (surname) =

Lanser is a German habitational surname of someone who can be from several places including Lans, Lanz or Lanze.

- Esther Lanser (born 1984) Dutch international cricketer
- Dyllan Lanser (born 1995) Dutch football player
- Susan S. Lanser English, Women's, Gender and Sexuality Studies and comparative literature academic
