= Kamea =

Kamea may refer to:

- Kamea, an occult magic square
- Kamea (dance company), an Israeli dance company
- Nao Kamea (born 1982), Papua New Guinean cricketer
- Semo Kamea (born 2001), Papua New Guinean cricketer
- Hamtai language, also known as the Kamea language, a Papua New Guinean language
- Kamea (2013–2025), American captive orca
