= England women's cricket team in Sri Lanka in 2010–11 =

English cricket team in Sri Lanka in 2010
	Sri Lanka	England
- Dates: 13 – 22 November 2010
Captains	Shashikala Siriwardene	Charlotte Edwards

One Day International series
- Results: England won the 2-match series 1–0
Most runs	Chamari Athapaththu (67)	Claire Taylor (80)
Most wickets	Deepika Rasangika (4)	Charlotte Edwards(6)

Twenty20 International series
- Results: England won the 3-match series 3–0
Most runs	Inoka Galagedara (43)	Jenny Gunn (82)
Most wickets	Deepika Rasangika (4)	Danielle Hazell (6)

The English women's cricket team toured Sri Lanka in 2010, playing a total of two Women's One Day Internationals and three Women's Twenty20 Internationals in the space of eight days.

== Touring party ==
England's touring party was announced in September 2010, with first-choice wicket-keeper Sarah Taylor choosing take some time off from international cricket. Katherine Brunt and Holly Colvin miss the tour as well to focus on a strength and conditioning programme and to concentrate on University studies. Lauren Griffiths, Beth MacGregor, Susie Rowe and Fran Wilson are called up.

Full touring party:

- Charlotte Edwards (captain)
- Jenny Gunn
- Lydia Greenway
- Lauren Griffiths
- Isa Guha
- Danielle Hazell
- Heather Knight
- Beth MacGregor
- Laura Marsh
- Beth Morgan
- Susie Rowe
- Anya Shrubsole
- Claire Taylor
- Fran Wilson
- Danielle Wyatt

== One Day International series ==
15 November 2010
Scorecard

England; 192 (49.4 overs)	v	Sri Lanka; 187/9 (50 overs)
Claire Taylor 73 (93); Deepika Rasangika 4/38 (8 overs)		Eshani Kaushalya 32 (42); Danielle Hazell 3/22 (10 overs)

England Women won by 5 runs
Nondescripts Cricket Club, Colombo
Umpires: Ranmore Martinesz and SH Sarathkumara
Player of the match: Claire Taylor (Eng)

17 November 2010
Scorecard

Sri Lanka; 173/8 (38 overs)	v	England; 30/1 (9.1 overs)
Chamari Athapaththu 37 (51); Charlotte Edwards 4/30 (8 overs)		Heather Knight 15* (26); Sripali Weerakkody 1/17 (5 overs)

No result
Paikiasothy Saravanamuttu Stadium, Colombo
Umpires: Ranmore Martinesz and Prageeth Rambukwella

- Match reduced to 38 overs per side due to rain.
  Rain stopped play after 9.1 overs of the second innings, no further play possible.

== Twenty20 International series ==
19 November 2010
Scorecard

Sri Lanka; 95/8 (20 overs)	v	England; 99/2 (15.4 overs)
Shashikala Siriwardene 22 (38); Charlotte Edwards 3/21 (4 overs)		Charlotte Edwards 48* (50); Deepika Rasangika 2/19 (3.4 overs)

England Women won by 8 wickets
Nondescripts Cricket Club, Colombo
Umpires: Gamini Dissanayake (SL) and Rohitha Kottahachchi (SL)
Player of the match: Charlotte Edwards (Eng)

- Sri Lanka Women won the toss and elected to bat.
- Beth MacGregor, Fran Wilson and Susie Rowe (Eng) made their WT20I debuts.

22 November 2010
Scorecard

England; 114 (19.5 overs)	v	Sri Lanka; 97 (20 overs)
Laura Marsh 30 (26); Shashikala Siriwardene 2/15 (3.5 overs)		Inoka Galagedara 28 (33); Laura Marsh 2/15 (4 overs)

England Women won by 17 runs
Nondescripts Cricket Club, Colombo
Umpires: Ranmore Martinesz (SL) and Tyron Wijewardene (SL)
Player of the match: Laura Marsh (Eng)

- Sri Lanka Women won the toss and elected to field.
- Match was scheduled to be played on 21 November 2010 but was abandoned due to rain, and replayed on 22 November 2010.
- Heather Knight (Eng) made her WT20I debut.

22 November 2010
Scorecard

England; 160/5 (20 overs)	v	Sri Lanka; 71 (18.3 overs)
Jenny Gunn 69 (46); Sripali Weerakkody 1/25 (3 overs)		Dilani Manodara 25* (38); Danielle Hazell 3/14 (4 overs)

England Women won by 89 runs
Nondescripts Cricket Club, Colombo
Umpires: Ranmore Martinesz (SL) and Tyron Wijewardene (SL)
Player of the match: Jenny Gunn (Eng)

- England Women won the toss and elected to bat.
