= Charlene Thompson =

Bermudian cricketer (born 1967)

Personal information
- Born: July 26, 1967 (age 57); Trinidad and Tobago

International information
- National side: Bermuda
- Source: Cricinfo, 1 December 2017

Charlene Thompson (born 26 July 1967) is a former Bermudian woman cricketer. She has played for Bermuda at the 2008 Women's Cricket World Cup Qualifier.
