= Stacey Simmons =

Bermudian cricketer (born 1972)

Personal information
- Born: 2 September 1972 (age 53)

International information
- National side: Bermuda
- Source: Cricinfo, 19 November 2017

Stacey Jodi Simmons (born 2 September 1972) is a former Bermudian woman cricketer. She represented Bermuda at the 2008 Women's Cricket World Cup Qualifier.
