= Reuna Richardson =

Bermudian cricketer (born 1992)

Personal information
- Born: 12 February 1992 (age 33)
- Batting: Right-handed
- Bowling: Right-arm fast medium

International information
- National side: Bermuda
- Source: Cricinfo, 8 December 2017

Reuna Richardson (born 12 February 1992) is a Bermudian woman cricketer. She played for Bermuda at the 2008 Women's Cricket World Cup Qualifier.
