= Suzette Albouy =

Bermudian cricketer (born 1965)

Personal information
- Born: January 1, 1965 (age 60)

International information
- National side: Bermuda
- Source: Cricinfo, 1 January 2018

Suzette Albouy (born 1 January 1965) is a former Bermudian woman cricketer. She made her international debut for Bermuda in the 2008 Women's Cricket World Cup Qualifier.
