= Wendy Woodley =

Bermudian cricketer (born 1968)

Personal information
- Born: February 11, 1968 (age 57)

International information
- National side: Bermuda
- Source: Cricinfo, 1 December 2017

Wendy Woodley (born 2 February 1968) is a Bermudian woman cricketer. She played for Bermuda at the 2008 Women's Cricket World Cup Qualifier.
