= Arkeita Smith =

Bermudian cricketer (born 1978)

Personal information
- Born: February 28, 1978 (age 48)

International information
- National side: Bermuda
- Source: Cricinfo, 8 December 2017

Arkeita Smith (born 28 February 1978) is a former Bermudian woman cricketer. She played for Bermuda at the 2008 Women's Cricket World Cup Qualifier.
