= Maryellen =

Maryellen is a given name. Notable people with the name include:

- MaryEllen Elia (born 1948), American educator
- Maryellen Fullerton, American lawyer and academic
- Maryellen L. Giger (born 1956), American physicist
- Maryellen Goodwin (1964–2023), American politician
- Maryellen Jackson (born 1967), Bermudian cricketer
- Maryellen MacDonald, American Professor of Psychology
- Maryellen Noreika (born 1966), American lawyer and jurist
- Maryellen O'Shaughnessy, American Democratic politician

== See also ==
- An American Girl Story – Maryellen 1955: Extraordinary Christmas, 2016 family-drama film
- 98825 Maryellen, minor planet, diameter 2.4 km
