= Chevonne Furbert =

Bermudian cricketer (born 1970)

Personal information
- Born: November 25, 1970 (age 54)
- Batting: Left-handed
- Bowling: Right-arm medium fast

International information
- National side: Bermuda
- Source: Cricinfo, 2 January 2018

Chevonne Furbert (born 25 November 1970) is a former Bermudian woman cricketer. She was a member of the Bermudian cricket team in the 2008 Women's Cricket World Cup Qualifier.
