= Stacy Babb =

Bermudian cricketer (born 1983)

Personal information
- Full name: Stacy Reena Lenita Babb
- Born: March 13, 1983 (age 43)

International information
- National side: Bermuda
- Source: Cricinfo, 11 August 2018

Stacy Reena Lenita Babb also known as Stacy Babb (born 13 March 1983) is a Bermudian woman cricketer who mainly played cricket during her career along with other sports including athletics, football and cycling. She was part of the Bermudian cricket team at the 2008 Women's Cricket World Cup Qualifier. Stacy also claimed a bronze medal in the women's U17 triple jump event during the 1998 Central American and Caribbean Junior Championships in Athletics.

She also served as a school teacher in Bermuda after her retirement from playing cricket.
