= Rickelle Smith =

Bermudian cricketer (born 1986)

Personal information
- Born: January 17, 1986 (age 40)

International information
- National side: Bermuda
- Source: Cricinfo, 1 December 2017

Rickelle Smith (born 17 January 1986) is a former Bermudian woman cricketer. She has played for Bermuda at the 2008 Women's Cricket World Cup Qualifier.
