= Lucy Ovia =

Papua New Guinean cricketer (born 1967)

Personal information
- Born: July 27, 1967 (age 58)

International information
- National side: Papua New Guinea
- Source: Cricinfo, 29 November 2017

Lucy Ovia (born 27 July 1967) is a former Papua New Guinean woman cricketer. She was also the part of the Papua New Guinea in the 2008 Women's Cricket World Cup Qualifier.
