= Charlotte Farr =

Scottish cricketer (born 1988)

Personal information
- Born: September 15, 1988 (age 36)
- Batting: Right-handed
- Bowling: Right-arm medium
- Source: Cricinfo, 14 August 2019

Charlotte Farr (born 15 September 1988) is a Scottish woman cricketer. She was part of the Scottish cricket team in the 2008 Women's Cricket World Cup Qualifier.
