= List of Papua New Guinea ODI cricketers =

The Papua New Guinea cricket team gained One Day International cricket (ODI) status in February 2014 after finishing in fourth place in the 2014 Cricket World Cup Qualifier. They played their first ODI match on 8 November 2014, against Hong Kong in Australia. They lost their ODI status in March 2018 after losing a playoff match against Nepal and finishing 9th in the 2018 Cricket World Cup Qualifier. Papua New Guinea regained ODI status on 26 April 2019, when they defeated Oman to secure a top-four finish in the 2019 ICC World Cricket League Division Two.

This list includes all players who have played at least one ODI match and is initially arranged in the order of debut appearance. Where more than one player won their first cap in the same match, their names are initially listed alphabetically at the time of debut.

== Key ==
General

- ‡ – Captain
- † – Wicket-keeper
- First – Year of debut
- Last – Year of latest game
- Mat – Number of matches played

Batting

- Runs – Runs scored in career
- HS – Highest score
- Avg – Runs scored per dismissal
- * – Batsman remained not out
- 100 – Centuries scored
- 50 – Half-centuries scored

Bowling

- Balls – Balls bowled in career
- Wkt – Wickets taken in career
- BBI – Best bowling in an innings
- Ave – Average runs per wicket
- 5WI – Five wickets or more in a match

Fielding

- Ca – Catches taken
- St – Stumpings taken

== Players ==
Statistics are correct as of 5 April 2023.

Papua New Guinea ODI cricketers
General					Batting					Bowling					Fielding		Ref
No.	Name	First	Last	Mat	Runs	HS	Avg	50	100	Balls	Wkt	BBI	Ave	5WI	Ca	St	Ref
1	Charles Amini	2014	2023	49	1,128	109	23.50	7	1	1,706	32	4/27	43.06	0	21	0	
2	Chris Amini ‡	2014	2014	2	3	3*	–	0	0	108	3	2/33	26.33	0	1	0	
3	Mahuru Dai	2014	2018	18	454	76*	28.37	3	0	954	18	3/58	37.50	0	8	0	
4	Willie Gavera	2014	2017	4	4	4*	–	0	0	192	5	3/49	32.00	0	0	0	
5	Geraint Jones	2014	2014	2	47	25	23.50	0	0	–	–	–	–	–	0	0	(Note: Geraint Jones also played One Day International cricket for England. Only his record for Papua New Guinea is given above.)
6	Vani Morea	2014	2018	13	313	65*	26.08	3	0	–	–	–	–	–	7	0	
7	Pipi Raho	2014	2014	1	–	–	–	–	–	45	2	2/32	16.00	0	1	0	
8	Lega Siaka	2014	2022	47	931	109	19.80	2	1	240	3	2/33	60.33	0	17	0	
9	Tony Ura	2014	2023	61	1,363	151	22.71	6	1	6	0	–	–	–	26	0	
10	Assad Vala ‡	2014	2023	66	2,003	104	30.81	12	1	2,388	55	3/17	28.70	0	34	0	
11	Jack Vare †	2014	2018	9	81	28	10.12	0	0	–	–	–	–	–	6	3	
12	Norman Vanua	2014	2023	57	837	60	17.08	2	0	2,402	61	4/24	34.18	0	16	0	
13	Dogodo Bau †	2016	2022	14	204	46	18.54	0	0	–	–	–	–	–	8	3	
14	Sese Bau	2016	2023	57	1,089	81*	20.16	5	0	710	10	2/35	57.60	0	20	0	
15	Hiri Hiri	2016	2023	34	454	77	15.13	1	0	102	3	1/6	37.66	0	2	0	
16	Chad Soper	2016	2023	56	751	46*	19.76	0	0	2,612	70	6/41	28.35	2	14	0	
17	John Reva	2016	2018	9	62	36	10.33	0	0	405	13	3/40	27.46	0	1	0	
18	Alei Nao	2017	2023	26	126	46	12.60	0	0	1,148	25	4/27	38.88	0	10	0	
19	Nosaina Pokana	2017	2022	21	63	11*	7.00	0	0	989	26	3/25	29.30	0	7	0	
20	Kiplin Doriga †	2017	2023	39	730	89*	20.27	4	0	–	–	–	–	–	19	6	
21	Damien Ravu	2017	2022	18	129	38*	12.90	0	0	648	8	2/19	71.75	0	2	0	
22	Jason Kila	2018	2021	13	159	36	15.90	0	0	229	6	3/27	33.33	0	3	0	
23	Simon Atai †	2019	2022	15	90	25*	10.00	0	0	48	0	–	–	–	9	1	
24	Gaudi Toka	2019	2023	22	268	29	12.76	0	0	99	3	3/18	36.66	0	7	0	
25	Riley Hekure	2019	2023	25	347	58	15.77	1	0	953	26	5/13	28.19	1	6	0	
26	Kabua Morea	2021	2023	17	73	17*	10.42	0	0	732	22	5/28	26.13	1	5	0	
27	Semo Kamea	2022	2023	22	20	5*	2.85	0	0	1,000	33	5/38	26.30	2	2	0	
28	Hila Vare †	2023	2023	6	20	7	5.00	0	0	–	–	–	–	–	7	0	
29	John Kariko	2023	2023	3	8	8	4.00	0	0	126	5	4/45	22.80	0	0	0	

== See also ==
- List of Papua New Guinean first-class cricketers
- Papua New Guinea T20I cricketers
