= Chipo Kamchetsa =

Zimbabwean cricketer (born 1984)

Personal information
- Full name: Tina Chipo Kamchetsa
- Born: October 8, 1984 (age 42)

International information
- National side: Zimbabwe
- Source: Cricinfo, 1 December 2017

Chipo Kamchetsa (born 8 October 1984) is a Zimbabwean woman cricketer. She has played for Zimbabwe at the 2008 Women's Cricket World Cup Qualifier.
