= Ed Rainsford =

Zimbabwean Zimbabwean cricket commentator (born 1984)

Personal information
- Full name: Edward Charles Rainsford
- Born: 14 December 1984 (age 41); Kadoma, Mashonaland, Zimbabwe
- Batting: Right-handed
- Bowling: Right-arm fast-medium
- Role: Bowler
- Relatives: Yvonne Rainsford (sister)

International information
- National side: Zimbabwe
- ODI debut (cap 83): 29 May 2004 v Australia
- Last ODI: 30 September 2010 v Ireland
- T20I debut (cap 26): 12 June 2010 v India
- Last T20I: 8 October 2010 v South Africa

Domestic team information
- Years: Team
- 2002–2006: Midlands
- 2007–2009: Centrals
- 2009–2011: Mid West Rhinos

Career statistics
Competition	ODI	T20I	FC	LA
Matches	39	2	56	72
Runs scored	55	1	672	164
Batting average	5.50	–	11.38	7.13
100s/50s	0/0	0/0	0/2	0/0
Top score	9*	1*	51	31*
Balls bowled	1,907	36	8,019	3,353
Wickets	45	0	180	86
Bowling average	31.13	–	20.85	29.22
5 wickets in innings	1	–	9	1
10 wickets in match	0	–	1	0
Best bowling	5/36	–	6/20	5/36
Catches/stumpings	9/–	0/–	27/–	15/–
- Source: ESPNcricinfo, 5 August 2011

Edward Charles Rainsford (born 14 December 1984) is a Zimbabwean cricket commentator and former cricketer. He has played 39 One Day Internationals and two Twenty20 Internationals for Zimbabwe. His sister, Yvonne Rainsford is a Zimbabwean cricketer who was also a member of the first Zimbabwe women's cricket team when they made their international debut in 2006.

== Career ==
=== Domestic career ===
Rainsford played two matches for the Gloucestershire Second XI in the Second XI Championship in 2008, taking five wickets at an average of 35.20, with a best of 3/56.

=== International career ===
Rainsford represented the Zimbabwe Under-19 cricket team at the 2004 Under-19 World Cup, taking four wickets in six games at an average of 38.00, with a best of 2/37.

He is primarily a right-arm medium-fast seam bowler with a 22.03 first-class average whose yorker-bowling skill is well documented.

During the 2006 Zimbabwean tour of Bangladesh, Rainsford left the tour early to fulfil a club contract in England with North London side Harefield CC. He took 33 wickets in 17 games, including a spectacular 4 wickets in 4 consecutive balls.

Edward Rainsford was ruled out of the World Cup 2011 due to an ankle injury, having to return home prematurely on that count.
