= Meigle Cricket Club =

Coordinates: 56.58605°N 3.16453°W

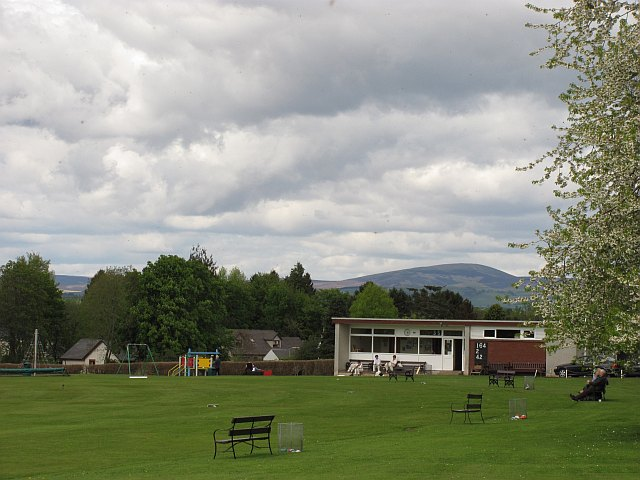
- View of Meigle's home ground, Victory Park

Team information
- Colours
- Founded: 1876
- Home ground: Victory Park

History
- SPCU 1st tier wins: 8
- Official website: Meigle CC

Meigle Cricket Club is a cricket club in Meigle, Perthshire, Scotland.

Established in 1876, it has won the Strathmore & Perthshire Cricket Union, of which it was a founder member in 1929, on eight occasions 2022, 2019, 2014, 2001, 1998, 1980, 1961 and 1954. The club was second to Brechin in the inaugural season.

The 1st XI played in the Cricket Scotland Eastern Premier League in 2021 and the club 2nd and 3rd XI play in the Strathmore & Perthshire Cricket Union lower divisions. The Union is one of three regional feeder leagues to the Cricket Scotland League set up. The club has long running rivalry with Freuchie Cricket Club from Fife from many years competing in the Scottish section of the National Village Cup which the club has won ten times, the first year of the Village Cup in 1972 and the most recent success was 2022 in a 5 wicket win over Falkland to make it three titles in a row. From the mid nineties to the late noughties the club were deemed ineligible for the competition. Meigle became eligible again in 2011 and in 2013 lost the Scottish final to Dumfries-shire side Kirkwood.

The club play at Victory Park which has a slight slope, though the other park in the Village, Belmont Park has also hosted cricket in the past. In 2001 the club, captained by Peter J. Drummond who later captained Forfarshire in the Scottish National Cricket League, played in the annual Play-Off to enter the Scottish National Cricket League but lost to Border League champions Penicuik. The 1st XI has also won the main Twenty20 cup for the North District, the Three Counties Cup (originally Forfarshire, Perthshire & Aberdeenshire) on six occasions 1951, 1980, 1983, 1984, 1998 and 2000 and have been runners up nine times, the last final appearance being in 2018 The 2001 undefeated league winning team are known as 'the invincibles', but the greatest team in the club's history is regarded by many to be the 1980 treble winning team. A short lived league cup 'The 3 D Sports Premier Trophy' was played for in 1999 and Meigle reached the final, but suffered a batting collapse and lost out to Gordonians at Guthrie Park, Brechin. Meigle had won their section with 100% record in a group with Dundee HSFP, Brechin and Cupar (Fife). The club have played in the Scottish Cup in six seasons, often qualifying by winning the Strathmore Union, or finishing in a high position.

The Meigle 2nd XI has won a 2nd XI title on five occasions; 1932, 1958, 1959, 1984 and 2018. The 2nd XI has won the Two Counties Cup on three occasions 1985, 1987 and 2000. The Strathmore Union allowed the Perthshire League to join it in 2004.

The club's greatest ever player is WB Scott, better known as Bill Scott. In 1997, in a match versus Arbroath United he became the first batsman to amass 10,000 league runs. He is also often referred to as 'the best amateur batsman never to have played for Scotland', he finished with over 13,000 runs in the Union top flight.

== Representative honours ==
The village has produced three full Scotland men's internationals: Gordon Drummond, J.R. (Ralph) Laing and JGB (Gordon) Laing. Ralph was also president of the Scottish Cricket Union, now rebranded as Cricket Scotland, in 1992. Gordon Drummond was captain of Scotland from mid 2009 to early 2013. Ryan Watson, a former club professional in the late 1990s, has also played and captained Scotland after qualifying through residency in 2002 as he is originally from Harare and was raised in South Africa. Two of the successful 2001 team also played representative cricket. Peter J Drummond played for Scotland U19 in 1998 as well as for East Coast Crusaders regional team, as it was called at that time and Iain M Stewart played for Scottish Universities in 2004 whilst playing for another club. Many players have represented the Strathmore Union select XI and its successor the Strathmore & Perthshire Union select XI such as Sandy Reid, JR Laing, Alan Pattullo, Nicol Whitelaw and Bill Scott (Senior)in the 1960s. Peter CJ Drummond and Bill Scott (Junior) in the 1980s and Denis Christie, Gordon Drummond, Peter J Drummond, Iain M Stewart, Callum Leese and Alasdair Gilmour appeared for the XI at various points from the 1998 through to 2012. Alan Neave and Matthew Farmer represented the select in 2015. Neil Kirk, while a Northern CC and Perthshire CCC player, represented Scotland U16, before becoming a productive run scorer at the top of the order for Meigle. Tom Duff played for the British Army and Scotland U17 in his younger days, before becoming a main stay of the Meigle middle order. Freddie Cox played for Scotland U15 in 2008, touring South Africa and playing in the U15 ICC Europe Championship. Cox scored his first career century for Scotland U15 in South Africa in 2008. Another revered Meigle player was Brian Reid. Brian was a highly skilled wicket keeper and handy batsman who played for Meigle in the 50's and 60's. His talents took him down south where he represented Sussex in seasons 1960 and 1961. Jamie Morrison played for the Scottish Students in a twenty20 match in June 2012, the national student representative team that was formerly called Scottish Universities up until the end of 2011. The club has also produced one full women's international cap player, Annette Drummond.
