= Gordon Drummond (cricketer) =

Scottish cricketer (born 1980)

Personal information
- Full name: Gordon David Drummond
- Born: 21 April 1980 (age 46); Meigle, Perthshire, Scotland
- Batting: Right-handed
- Bowling: Right-arm medium
- Relatives: Annette Drummond (sister); Abbi Aitken-Drummond (sister-in-law)

International information
- National side: Scotland
- ODI debut (cap 29): 12 July 2007 v West Indies
- Last ODI: 8 September 2013 v Ireland
- T20I debut (cap 14): 2 August 2008 v Ireland
- Last T20I: 5 July 2013 v Kenya

Career statistics
Competition	ODI	T20I	FC	LA
Matches	30	17	12	82
Runs scored	240	54	217	453
Batting average	18.46	7.71	13.56	10.78
100s/50s	0/0	0/0	0/1	0/0
Top score	35*	35	52	35*
Balls bowled	1,263	330	1,578	3,098
Wickets	25	16	18	59
Bowling average	37.28	23.81	31.16	43.23
5 wickets in innings	0	0	0	0
10 wickets in match	0	0	0	0
Best bowling	4/41	3/20	3/18	4/41
Catches/stumpings	5/–	2/–	6/–	16/–
- Source: Cricinfo, 26 January 2025

Gordon David Drummond (born 21 April 1980) is a former Scottish international cricketer who made his One Day International (ODI) debut at the 2007 World Cup. A right-handed all-rounder from rural Perthshire, he took over the captaincy of the national side from Gavin Hamilton in 2010, and continued in the role until resigning in May 2013, retiring from international cricket completely later in the season. His younger sister, Annette Drummond, represents the Scottish national women's team, and the pair began their careers together at Meigle Cricket Club.
