= Yvonne Rainsford =

Zimbabwean cricketer (born 1983)

Personal information
- Full name: Yvonne Belinda Rainsford
- Born: 21 March 1983 (age 43); Kadoma, Zimbabwe
- Batting: Right-handed
- Bowling: Right arm fast medium
- Relatives: Ed Rainsford (brother)

International information
- National side: Zimbabwe
- Source: Cricinfo, 21 November 2017

Yvonne Belinda Rainsford (born 21 March 1983) is a former Zimbabwean cricketer. She is the sister of Zimbabwean cricketer Ed Rainsford.

She was also the part of the Zimbabwean cricket team in its historical international debut in 2006. Rainsford made her ODI debut in the World Cup Pre-Qualifier in 2006 against Uganda. She played a crucial role in Zimbabwe's qualification to the 2008 Women's Cricket World Cup Qualifier, wherein Zimbabwe was ranked 5th.
