= Mebo Ipi =

Papua New Guinean cricketer (born 1979)

Personal information
- Full name: Mebo Pendel Ipi
- Born: September 17, 1979 (age 46)

International information
- National side: Papua New Guinea
- Source: Cricinfo, 5 December 2017

Mebo Pendel Ipi is a former Papua New Guinean woman cricketer. She played for Papua New Guinea in the 2008 Women's Cricket World Cup Qualifier.
