= Boni David =

Papua New Guinean cricketer (born 1978)

Personal information
- Born: August 4, 1978 (age 48)

International information
- National side: Papua New Guinea
Medal record
Representing Papua New Guinea
Women's Cricket
Pacific Games
Silver medal – second place	2015 Port Moresby	20 over cricket
- Source: Cricinfo, 7 December 2017

Boni David (born 4 August 1978) is a Papua New Guinean woman cricketer. She played for Papua New Guinea at the 2008 Women's Cricket World Cup Qualifier.
