= Bede Morea =

Papua New Guinean cricketer (born 1980)

Personal information
- Full name: Bede Susan Morea
- Born: December 29, 1980 (age 45)

International information
- National side: Papua New Guinea
- Source: Cricinfo, 29 November 2017

Bede Susan Morea (born 29 December 1980) is a former Papua New Guinean woman cricketer. She represented Papua New Guinea in the 2008 Women's Cricket World Cup Qualifier.
