= Charles Amini =

Papua New Guinean cricketer

Personal information
- Full name: Charles Jordan Amini
- Born: 14 April 1992 (age 34); Port Moresby, Papua New Guinea
- Batting: Left-handed
- Bowling: Right-arm leg break
- Role: All rounder
- Relatives: Kune Amini (mother); Chris Amini (brother)

International information
- National side: Papua New Guinea (2014-2026)
- ODI debut (cap 1): 8 November 2014 v Hong Kong
- Last ODI: 5 April 2023 v Canada
- T20I debut (cap 1): 15 July 2015 v Ireland
- Last T20I: 21 September 2023 v Hong Kong

Career statistics
Competition	ODI	T20I	FC	LA
Matches	49	40	2	68
Runs scored	1,128	681	39	1,365
Batting average	23.50	21.96	9.75	21.66
100s/50s	1/7	0/3	0/0	1/7
Top score	109	62	19	109
Balls bowled	1706	628	42	2,408
Wickets	32	29	0	53
Bowling average	43.06	24.65	–	35.09
5 wickets in innings	0	0	–	1
10 wickets in match	0	0	–	0
Best bowling	4/27	2/13	–	6/19
Catches/stumpings	21/–	9/–	3/–	23/–
Medal record
Representing Papua New Guinea
Men's Cricket
Pacific Games
Gold medal – first place	2019 Apia	Twenty20 International
- Source: ESPNcricinfo, 21 September 2023

Charles Jordan Alewa Amini, also known as CJ Amini, (born 14 April 1992) is a former Papua New Guinea cricketer. He is the son of Kune Amini and brother of Chris Amini, who both have also represented PNG.

== Playing career ==
Charles led Papua New Guinea's successful campaign in the ICC East Asia-Pacific Under-15 Cricket 8's in 2006/07.

He was part of the squad in the Under-19 Cricket World Cup in Malaysia in 2008, and took eight wickets in the Qualifiers for the Under-19 Cricket World Cup in New Zealand in 2010. Amini made his Twenty20 debut level for Papua New Guinea in November 2013.

In December 2013, he signed a rookie contract with the Sydney Sixers for the 2013–14 Big Bash League season.

In January 2014, he dismissed Uganda's top five batsmen and eventually finished with career best figures of 6 for 19 in 10 overs as Uganda lost 10 for 52 to be all out for 105 in 35.5 overs during the ICC Cricket World Cup Qualifiers at Pukekura Park, New Plymouth.

He made his One Day International debut on 8 November 2014 against Hong Kong in Australia. He made his Twenty20 International debut against Ireland during the 2015 ICC World Twenty20 Qualifier tournament on 15 July 2015.

In March 2018, at the 2018 Cricket World Cup Qualifier 9th/10th place playoff against Hong Kong in what was the 4,000th ODI to be played, Amini took 4 wickets for 27 runs. He had also scored 21 runs in Papua New Guinea's innings, earning the player of the match award. This was also Papua New Guinea's final One Day International before losing their ODI status.

In August 2018, he was named as the vice-captain of Papua New Guinea's squad for Group A of the 2018–19 ICC World Twenty20 East Asia-Pacific Qualifier tournament. In March 2019, he was named as the vice-captain of Papua New Guinea's squad for the Regional Finals of the 2018–19 ICC World Twenty20 East Asia-Pacific Qualifier tournament. The following month, he was named vice-captain of Papua New Guinea's squad for the 2019 ICC World Cricket League Division Two tournament in Namibia. He was named as one of the six players to watch during the tournament.

In June 2019, he was selected to represent the Papua New Guinea cricket team in the men's tournament at the 2019 Pacific Games. In September 2019, he was named as the vice-captain of Papua New Guinea's squad for the 2019 ICC T20 World Cup Qualifier tournament in the United Arab Emirates. In August 2021, Amini was named in Papua New Guinea's squad for the 2021 ICC Men's T20 World Cup.

He was in Papua New Guinea's squad for the 2023 Cricket World Cup Qualifier Play-off. He scored his maiden century in ODI cricket, on 30 March 2023, against Namibia.

In May 2024, he was named in Papua New Guinea’s squad for the 2024 ICC Men's T20 World Cup tournament.

== Personal life ==
Amini hails from a family with deep cricketing roots. His grandfather Brian and father Charles both captained Papua New Guinea's senior side, while his brother Chris was also a Papua New Guinea senior and Under-19 captain.

His mother Kune led the Papua New Guinea women's team as well, and his aunt, Cheryl Amini, also played for the women's national team.
