= Ura Rigana =

Papua New Guinean cricketer (born 1976)

Personal information
- Full name: Uranus Rigana Kwalu
- Born: June 24, 1976 (age 50)

International information
- National side: Papua New Guinea
- Source: Cricinfo, 29 November 2017

Ura Rigana Kwalu (born 24 June 1976) is a former Papua New Guinean woman cricketer. She played for Papua New Guinea in the 2008 Women's Cricket World Cup Qualifier.
