= Chris Amini =

Papua New Guinean cricketer (born 1984)

Personal information
- Full name: Christopher Ralai Amini
- Born: 12 June 1984 (age 42); Port Moresby, Papua New Guinea
- Batting: Right-handed
- Bowling: Right-arm medium
- Role: Batsman
- Relatives: Kune Amini (mother); Charles Amini (brother)

International information
- National side: Papua New Guinea (2005–2014)
- ODI debut (cap 2): 8 November 2014 v Hong Kong
- Last ODI: 9 November 2014 v Hong Kong

Career statistics
Competition	ODI	LA	T20
Matches	2	15	18
Runs scored	3	141	163
Batting average	–	17.62	23.28
100s/50s	0/0	0/0	0/0
Top score	3*	42	44
Balls bowled	108	450	356
Wickets	3	8	16
Bowling average	26.33	42.00	26.37
5 wickets in innings	0	0	0
10 wickets in match	0	0	0
Best bowling	2/33	2/25	2/15
Catches/stumpings	1/–	7/–	5/–
Medal record
Representing Papua New Guinea
Men's Cricket
Pacific Games
Silver medal – second place	2015 Port Moresby	20 over cricket
- Source: CricketArchive, 1 March 2018

Christopher Ralai Amini is a Papua New Guinean cricketer. A right-handed batsman and right-arm medium pace bowler, he has played for the Papua New Guinea national cricket team since 2005.

== Biography ==
Born in Port Moresby to Charles and Kune Amini in 1984, Amini first played for Papua New Guinea at Under-19 level in the 2002 Under-19 World Cup in New Zealand and the same tournament in Bangladesh in 2004.

Whilst he had previously played for a combined East Asia Pacific team in the Australian National Country Cricket Championships in 2004 and 2005, his debut for the senior Papua New Guinea team came when he played in the repêchage tournament of the 2005 ICC Trophy. Papua New Guinea won the tournament after beating Fiji in the final. This qualified them for the 2005 ICC Trophy in Ireland in which Amini played, making his List A debut.

He most recently represented his country at Division Three of the World Cricket League in Darwin in 2007 and has since played for an East Asia-Pacific Emerging Players team in Australia.

He made his One Day International debut for Papua New Guinea on 8 November 2014 against Hong Kong in Australia.

== Family ==
Chris Amini comes from a cricketing family. His father and grandfather both captained Papua New Guinea whilst his mother and aunt have played for the Papua New Guinea women's team. Two of his brothers have also played for the Papua New Guinea Under-19s team.
