= Henao Sam =

Papua New Guinean cricketer (born 1985)

Personal information
- Born: 20 September 1985 (age 40)

International information
- National side: Papua New Guinea
- Source: Cricinfo, 19 November 2017

Henao Sam (born 20 September 1985) is a Papua New Guinean woman cricketer. She represented Papua New Guinea in the 2008 Women's Cricket World Cup Qualifier.
