= Kune Amini =

Papua New Guinean cricketer (1964–2021)

Personal information
- Full name: Kunemo Rupa Amini
- Born: 28 November 1964; Lae, Papua New Guinea
- Died: 29 September 2021 (aged 56); Port Moresby, Papua New Guinea

International information
- National side: Papua New Guinea
- Source: Cricinfo

Kunemo Rupa Amini (28 November 1964 – 29 September 2021) was a Papua New Guinean cricketer and captain of the women's national cricket team from 2006 to 2009. She captained PNG at the 2008 Women's Cricket World Cup Qualifier, the team's first international appearance. She was one of the team's leading batters.

Amini's husband, Charles Amini and three sons CJ, Colin Amini and Chris Amini have also represented PNG in cricket. She died suddenly in Port Moresby on 29 September 2021, at the age of 56.
