= Susan Kudzibatira =

Zimbabwean cricketer (born 1985)

Personal information
- Born: September 30, 1985 (age 41)

International information
- National side: Zimbabwe
- Source: Cricinfo, 1 December 2017

Susan Kudzibatira (born 30 September 1985) is a Zimbabwean woman cricketer. She has played for Zimbabwe at the 2008 Women's Cricket World Cup Qualifier.
