= Van der Stel Cricket Club Ground =

Cricket ground

- Location: Boland, Stellenbosch
- Home club: Van der Stel Cricket Club
- Establishment: 2000–01
- Owner: Van der Stel Cricket Club
- Tenants: Western Province
- Last used: 2022–23
- As of 24 April 2023; Source: CricketArchive

Van der Stel Cricket Club Ground is a cricket ground at Boland, a region in the Stellenbosch, South Africa. It was used as the home ground for the Western Province cricket team in both men's and women's cricket. The first recorded match played on this ground was a Women's List A match between Boland and Eastern Province on 19 October 2003, in the 2003–04 CSA Women's Provincial Programme. It hosted five matches of the 2008 Women's Cricket World Cup Qualifier. One first-class match was also played on this ground on 14 January 2010, between Boland and Northerns in the 2009–10 CSA 3-Day Provincial Cup. Van der Stel Cricket Club also uses the ground for playing minor club matches.
