= Konio Heagi =

Papua New Guinean cricketer (born 1973)

Personal information
- Born: July 3, 1973 (age 51); Port Moresby, Papua New Guinea

International information
- National side: Papua New Guinea
- Source: Cricinfo, 7 December 2017

Konio Heagi (born 3 July 1973) is a Papua New Guinean woman cricketer. She played for Papua New Guinea at the 2008 Women's Cricket World Cup Qualifier.
