= Linda Mienzer =

Bermudian cricketer (born 1965)

Personal information
- Born: March 31, 1965 (age 61)

International information
- National side: Bermuda (2006–2008)
- Source: Cricinfo, 8 December 2017

Linda Mienzer (born 31 March 1965) is a Bermudian woman cricketer. She captained the Bermudian women's cricket team at the 2008 Women's Cricket World Cup Qualifier.

== See also ==
- List of LGBT sportspeople
