= Maryellen Jackson =

Bermudian cricketer (born 1967)

Personal information
- Born: 3 December 1967 (age 58)
- Batting: Right-handed
- Bowling: Right-arm off-break

International information
- National side: Bermuda
- Source: Cricinfo, 31 December 2017

Maryellen Jackson (born 3 December 1967) is a former Bermudian woman cricketer. She made her international debut for Bermuda at the 2008 Women's Cricket World Cup Qualifier.
