= Emily Jinjika =

Zimbabwean cricketer (born 1985)

Personal information
- Born: 3 December 1985 (age 40); Harare, Zimbabwe
- Batting: Right-handed
- Bowling: Right-arm medium

International information
- National side: Zimbabwe
- Source: Cricinfo, 21 November 2017

Emily Jinjika (born 3 December 1985) is a former Zimbabwean woman cricketer. She played for Zimbabwe in the 2008 Women's Cricket World Cup Qualifier.
