= Terry-Lynn Paynter =

Bermudian cricketer (born 1969)

Personal information
- Born: 3 May 1969 (age 57)
- Batting: Right-handed
- Bowling: Right-arm off break
- Source: Cricinfo, 8 December 2017

Terry-Lynn Paynter (born 3 May 1969) is a former Bermudian javelin thrower and cricketer. She is the first captain of the Womans national cricket team. She played for Bermuda at the 2008 Women's Cricket World Cup Qualifier. also played football(soccer) 1990s and fast pick softball for her country at women's world championships in St Johns Newfound land in 1994, and CAC
