= Karo Lumis =

Papua New Guinean cricketer (born 1980)

Personal information
- Born: March 4, 1980 (age 45); Port Moresby, Papua New Guinea

International information
- National side: Papua New Guinea
- Source: Cricinfo, 3 December 2017

Karo Lumis (born 4 March 1980) is a Papua New Guinean woman cricketer. She played for Papua New Guinea in the 2008 Women's Cricket World Cup Qualifier.
