= Julia Chibhabha =

Zimbabwean cricketer (born 1982)

Personal information
- Born: 17 September 1982 (age 44); Bulawayo, Zimbabwe
- Batting: Left-handed
- Bowling: Slow left-arm orthodox
- Relatives: Chamu Chibhabha (brother)

Domestic team information
- Years: Team
- 2007: Northern
- Source: ESPNcricinfo, 11 October 2020

Julia Chibhabha (born 17 September 1982) is a Zimbabwean women's cricketer and is the first captain of the Zimbabwe national women's cricket team. She is the sister of Zimbabwe's batsman Chamu Chibhabha.

In 2006, she was selected to the national team for World Cup qualifiers which was held in South Africa in 2008. She played for Africa XI in the lone Twenty20 match against Asia XI during the 2007 Afro-Asia Cup. In 2010, she returns to the national squad for the Women's World Cup Regional Qualifiers which was held in Kenya in December. She was also a scorer in men's domestic cricket in Zimbabwe, including matches in the Logan Cup and Fairweather Inter-Provincial Tournament.

She is Zimbabwe's only female accredited coach. In July 2020, she was named as the convenor of the Zimbabwean women's selection panel.
