= Ruvarashe Chinyemba =

Zimbabwean cricketer (born 1992)

Personal information
- Full name: Ruvarashe Christabel Chinyemba
- Born: March 6, 1992 (age 34); Harare, Zimbabwe
- Batting: Right-handed
- Bowling: Left-arm medium fast

International information
- National side: Zimbabwe
- Source: Cricinfo, 29 November 2017

Ruvarashe Christabel Chinyemba (born 6 March 1992) is a former Zimbabwean woman cricketer. She represented Zimbabwe in the 2008 Women's Cricket World Cup Qualifier.
