= Olivia Anderson =

South African cricketer (born 1987)

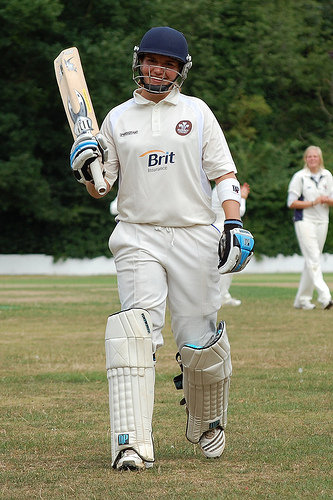
- Anderson playing for Shepperton in 2010

Personal information
- Full name: Olivia Victoria Anderson
- Born: 18 November 1987 (age 38); South Africa
- Batting: Right-handed
- Role: Wicket-keeper

International information
- National side: South Africa (2008)
- ODI debut (cap 51): 22 February 2008 v Ireland
- Last ODI: 8 August 2008 v England
- T20I debut (cap 16): 22 August 2008 v England
- Last T20I: 23 August 2008 v England

Domestic team information
- Years: Team
- 2004/05–2012/13: Western Province
- 2007/08: KwaZulu-Natal
- 2009: Devon
- 2010–2011: Surrey

Career statistics
Competition	WODI	WT20I	WLA	WT20
Matches	5	2	108	18
Runs scored	111	1	3,206	305
Batting average	37.00	0.50	36.85	20.33
100s/50s	0/0	0/0	2/20	0/0
Top score	46*	1	123	45
Catches/stumpings	0/–	0/–	54/29	5/4
- Source: CricketArchive, 23 February 2022

Olivia Victoria Anderson (born 18 November 1987) is a South African former cricketer who played as a right-handed batter and wicket-keeper. She appeared in five One Day Internationals and two Twenty20 Internationals for South Africa in 2008. She played domestic cricket for Western Province, KwaZulu-Natal, Devon and Surrey.

In the English 2010 season, she played for Shepperton, both for the ladies team, and the men's second team, in both of which she was the leading run scorer (also coming 5th in the men's league averages) as well as keeping wicket. She was Surrey's leading run-scorer in the 2010 Women's County Championship, with 370 runs.
