= Nonhlanhla Nyathi =

Zimbabwean cricketer (born 1987)

Personal information
- Born: 5 December 1987 (age 38); Bulawayo, Zimbabwe
- Batting: Right-handed
- Role: Wicket-keeper

International information
- National side: Zimbabwe
- Source: Cricinfo, 15 October 2025

Nonhlanhla Nyathi (born 5 December 1987) is a Zimbabwean cricketer. She bats right-handed and her main specialty is as a wicket-keeper, a position she has held since 2008 for the Zimbabwe women's national team. She has represented Zimbabwe in major games for the ICC Women's Qualifiers and also plays local cricket at Takashinga Cricket Club. She played for the national cricket team in the 2017 Women's Cricket World Cup Qualifier in February 2017.
