= Gari Mea =

Papua New Guinean cricketer (born 1976)

Personal information
- Born: February 11, 1976 (age 49)

International information
- National side: Papua New Guinea
- Source: Cricinfo, 29 November 2017

Gari Mea (born 11 February 1976) is a former Papua New Guinean woman cricketer. She was also a member of the Papua New Guinean cricket team during the 2008 Women's Cricket World Cup Qualifier.
