= Ministry of External Affairs =

Ministry of External Affairs may refer to:

- Ministry of External Affairs (Andorra)
- Ministry of External Affairs and Defence, Ceylon (former)
- Ministry of External Affairs (India)
- Ministry of External Affairs (Malaysia)
- Ministry of External Affairs (Rhodesia)
- Ministry of External Affairs (Romania)
- Ministry of External Affairs (Soviet Union)
- Ministry of Foreign Affairs and Trade (New Zealand), formerly the Ministry of External Affairs
- Ministry of External Affairs (Sri Lanka)

== See also ==
- Ministry of Foreign Affairs
