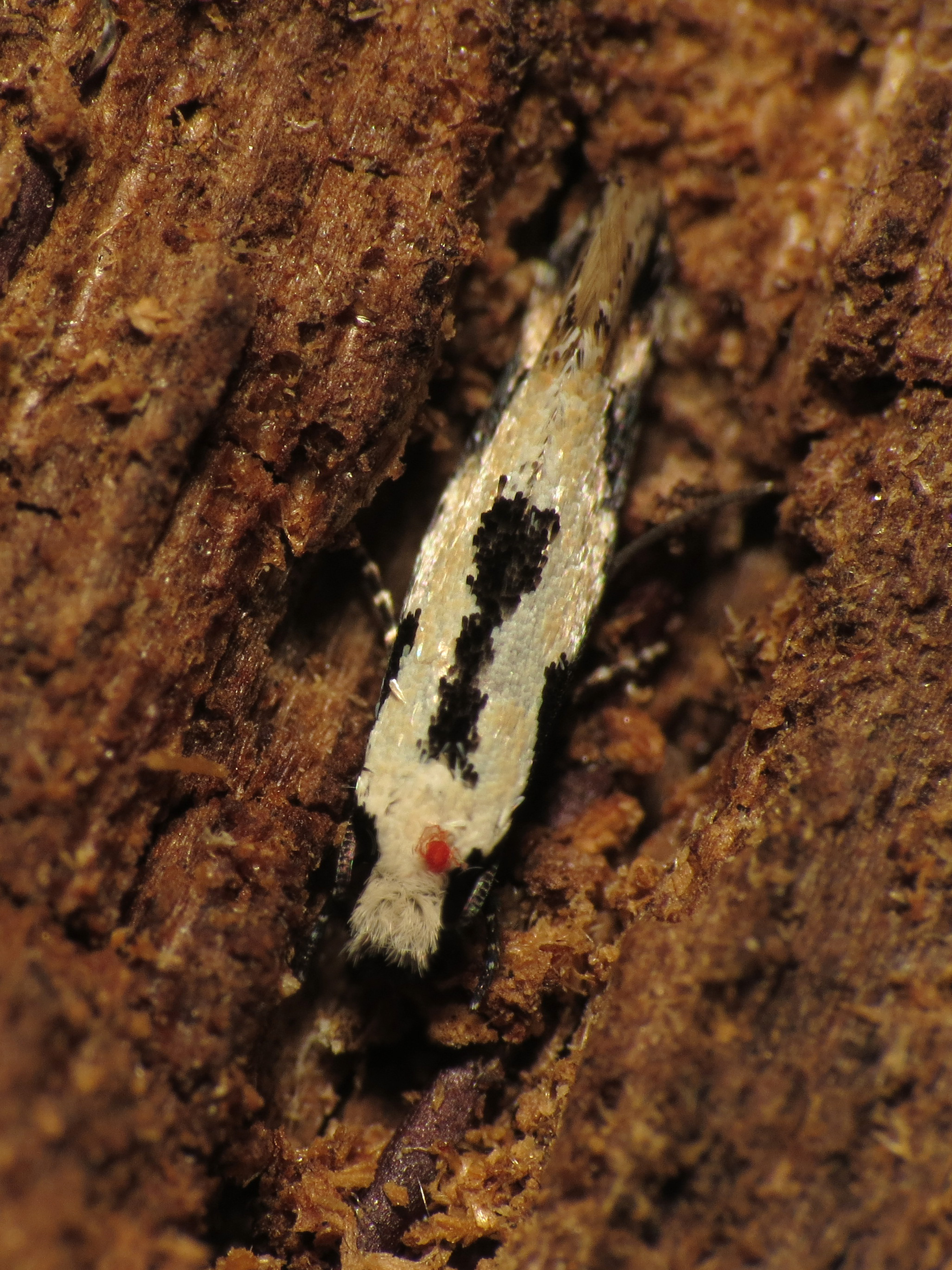
- Mea bipunctella

Scientific classification
- Kingdom: Animalia
- Phylum: Arthropoda
- Clade: Pancrustacea
- Class: Insecta
- Order: Lepidoptera
- Family: Tineidae
- Genus: Mea; Busck, 1906

Synonyms
- Progona Dietz, 1905 (preocc. Berg, 1882)

= Mea (moth) =

Genus of moths

Mea is a genus of moths belonging to the family Tineidae.

== Species ==
- Mea bipunctella Dietz, 1905
- Mea incudella Forbes, 1931
- Mea skinnerella Dietz, 1905
- Mea yunquella Forbes, 1931
