= Nao Kamea =

Papua New Guinean cricketer (born 1982)

Personal information
- Born: May 6, 1982 (age 43)

International information
- National side: Papua New Guinea
- Source: Cricinfo, 7 December 2017

Nao Kamea (born 6 May 1982) is a Papua New Guinean woman cricketer. She played for Papua New Guinea at the 2008 Women's Cricket World Cup Qualifier.
