= Sahar Aslam =

Irish cricketer

Personal information
- Full name: Sahar Aslam
- Born: 20 December 1982 (age 43); Ireland
- Batting: Right-handed
- Bowling: Right-arm slow

International information
- National side: Scotland (2003–2011)
- ODI debut (cap 17): 22 July 2003 v Pakistan
- Last ODI: 26 July 2003 v Ireland

Career statistics
Competition	ODI
Matches	3
Runs scored	0
Batting average	0.00
100s/50s	0/0
Top score	0*
Balls bowled	18
Wickets	0
Bowling average	–
5 wickets in innings	–
10 wickets in match	–
Best bowling	–
Catches/stumpings	0/–
- Source: Cricinfo, 4 October 2015

Sahar Aslam (born 20 December 1982) is a former Scottish international cricketer. Her career for the Scottish national side spanned from 2003 to 2011, and included three One Day International (ODI) matches at the 2003 IWCC Trophy.

Born in Ireland, Aslam first played representative cricket for a Scottish team in 2002, when she represented the national under-21 side on a tour of England and at the European Under-21 Championship. Her senior debut came the following year, at the age of 20, when she played in three of Scotland's five games at the IWCC Trophy in the Netherlands. All matches at the tournament, the qualifier for the 2005 World Cup, held ODI status, which meant Aslam became one of the few women to represent Scotland at that level. However, she had little influence in her appearances (against Pakistan, the West Indies, and Ireland), bowling three overs without taking a wicket and failing to score a single run from her three innings.

Aslam's next major international tournament was the 2007 edition of the European Championship, which was played in the Netherlands. Although she performed poorly there, she was included in the Scottish squad for the 2008 World Cup Qualifier in South Africa, and went on to play in all five of her team's matches. Her best performance there came against Papua New Guinea, 2/19 from ten overs in the fifth-place playoff semi-final. Later in the year, Aslam was included in Scotland's squad for its second appearance in the Women's County Championship, the English domestic competition. She remained a regular for the team until her retirement in 2011, aged 28, with her final season including matches in the County Championship, the European Championship, and the European Twenty20 Championship. Her club cricket had been played for Aberdeenshire.
