= Dyllan Lanser =

Dutch footballer

Personal information
- Date of birth: 2 March 1995 (age 31)
- Place of birth: Lelystad, Netherlands
- Height: 1.63 m (5 ft 4 in)
- Position: Left-back

Team information
- Current team: Unicum

Youth career
- SV Batavia '90
- Almere City

Senior career*
Years	Team	Apps	(Gls)
2012–2017	Almere City	15	(0)
2012–2017	Jong Almere City	73	(3)
2017–2018	De Dijk	0	(0)
2018–2019	Lelystad '67	0	(0)
2019–	Unicum	0	(0)
- * Club domestic league appearances and goals

Dyllan Lanser (born 2 March 1995) is a Dutch football player who plays as a left-back for Tweede Klasse club Unicum.

== Club career ==
He made his professional debut in the Eerste Divisie for Almere City FC on 14 September 2012 in a game against SC Cambuur.

Lanser signed with ASV De Dijk as a free agent in 2017. A year later Lanser returned to his hometown Lelystad, where he began playing for Lelystad '67. He left this club in 2019 for fellow Lelystad-club VV Unicum.
