= Fiona Urquhart =

Scottish cricketer

Personal information
- Full name: Fiona Elaine Urquhart
- Born: 20 August 1987 (age 39); Aberdeen, Scotland
- Batting: Right-handed
- Bowling: Right-arm fast-medium
- Role: All-rounder

International information
- National side: Scotland (2000–2017)
- ODI debut (cap 10): 10 August 2001 v England
- Last ODI: 26 July 2003 v Ireland

Career statistics
Competition	ODI
Matches	8
Runs scored	41
Batting average	5.85
100s/50s	0/0
Top score	16
Balls bowled	269
Wickets	4
Bowling average	54.00
5 wickets in innings	0
10 wickets in match	0
Best bowling	2/19
Catches/stumpings	0/–
- Source: Cricinfo, 22 October 2015

Fiona Elaine Urquhart (born 20 August 1987) is a Scottish former international cricketer who debuted for the Scottish national side in 2000. An all-rounder, she has appeared in all eight of the One Day International (ODI) matches that Scotland has played to date. In April 2017, she announced her retirement from international cricket.

== Early life ==
Urquhart was born in Aberdeen. She began her career at the city's Stoneywood Dyce Cricket Club.

== Career ==
She was first called up to the national squad shortly before her thirteenth birthday, playing two matches against English county teams (Durham and Yorkshire) during the 2000 season. The following year, Urquhart was selected in the Scottish squad for the 2001 European Championship, where Scotland was appearing at ODI level for the first time. She went on to play in all three of her team's matches, going runless and wicketless against England and Ireland, but taking 2/19 against the Netherlands and also scoring nine runs. At the time of her ODI debut, Urquhart was 13 years and 355 days old, making her the second-youngest debutant after Pakistan's Sajjida Shah. Two other players, Lucy O'Reilly and Elena Tice, have since played at younger ages, both representing Ireland.

At the 2003 IWCC Trophy in the Netherlands, Scotland's next major international tournament, Urquhart again appeared in all of her team's matches. She took 1/26 against Pakistan and 1/8 against Japan, but was wicketless in the other matches. Her highest score, 16 runs from fourth in the batting order, came in the opening match against the Netherlands. The IWCC Trophy is Scotland's most recent ODI tournament to date, with Urquhart being one of only three players (along with Kari Anderson and Kathryn White) to feature in every ODI played by the team. At the 2005 and 2007 European Championships, Scotland's next major events, Urquhart appeared in all but one match, although she had little success in either year.

In January 2008, aged 20, Urquhart was appointed captain of Scotland for the 2008 World Cup Qualifier in South Africa. However, at the tournament itself, a finger injury meant she was only able to appear in the matches against Ireland and Zimbabwe, with Kari Anderson taking over as skipper in the remaining games. In the Women's County Championship, where Scotland debuted later in the year, Anderson and Urquhart rotated the captaincy duties. However, Anderson was appointed sole captain for the 2009 season, and Urquhart has only since captained the team in her absence. During the 2009 County Championship, Urquhart put in some of her best bowling performances, taking 4/19 against Worcestershire and 3/30 against Staffordshire. A few years later, in 2012, she scored her maiden County Championship half-century, making 50 runs exactly against Northamptonshire.

Urquhart spent the 2013–14 Northern Hemisphere off-season playing in Australia, appearing for Campbelltown-Camden in the Sydney grade cricket competition. She returned for the 2014–15 season, but switched to the Sydney Cricket Club, which plays in the same league. Urquhart remained in Australia after the season's end, and in July 2015, it was announced that she had been appointed head coach of the club's women teams for the 2015–16 season, while continuing on as a player. Despite not having played in any of Scotland's matches in English domestic competitions, she was selected in the national squad for the 2015 World Twenty Qualifier late in the year.
