= Sharina Ravikumar =

Sri Lankan cricketer (born 1992)

Personal information
- Born: 31 March 1992 (age 34); Colombo, Sri Lanka
- Batting: Right-handed
- Bowling: Left-arm

International information
- National side: Sri Lanka
- ODI debut (cap 47): 17 November 2010 v England
- Last ODI: 13 February 2013 v South Africa
- T20I debut (cap 21): 22 November 2010 v England
- Last T20I: 24 September 2018 v India
- Source: ESPNcricinfo, 24 September 2018

Sharina Ravikumar (born 31 March 1992) is a Sri Lankan cricketer who plays for Sri Lanka's women's cricket team. She made both her One Day International (ODI) and Twenty20 International (T20I) debut against England in November 2010, where she did not get a chance to bat or bowl in the ODI, and claimed a wicket and scored 3 runs in the T20I.
