= Denise Prins =

Dutch cricketer

Personal information
- Born: 22 February 1983 (age 43); Schiedam, Netherlands
- Batting: Right-handed
- Role: Batsman

International information
- National side: Netherlands (2004–2010)
- ODI debut (cap 71): 23 August 2006 v Ireland
- Last ODI: 12 October 2010 v South Africa
- T20I debut (cap 21): 14 October 2010 v South Africa
- Last T20I: 16 October 2010 v West Indies

Career statistics
Competition	WODI	WT20I
Matches	7	2
Runs scored	15	14
Batting average	2.14	14.00
100s/50s	0/0	0/0
Top score	8	11
Catches/stumpings	1/–	0/–
- Source: CricketArchive, 19 November 2015

Denise Prins (born 22 February 1983) is a former Dutch international cricketer whose career for the Dutch national side spanned from 2004 to 2010.

Born in Schiedam, Prins played her club cricket for Hermes-DVS, which is based in the city. Her senior debut for the Netherlands came in May 2004, when she played against two English county teams (Warwickshire and Durham), but she did not play in an international until August 2006, when she featured in a One Day International (ODI) game against Ireland. Prins's first major international tournament for the Netherlands was the 2008 World Cup Qualifier in South Africa, where she played in three matches with little success. In total, she played in seven ODIs, with her final matches in the format coming at the 2010 ICC Women's Challenge. At that tournament, Prins also played the only Twenty20 International matches of her career, with the first coming against the South Africa and the second (and final) coming against the West Indies.
