= New Williamfield =

Cricket ground in Stirling, Scotland

Coordinates: 56°07′18.37″N 03°54′35.75″W

New Williamfield No. 1 Oval
- Interactive map of New Williamfield No. 1 Oval

Ground information
- Location: Stirling, Scotland
- Country: Scotland
- Home club: Stirling County Cricket Club
- Establishment: 2007

International information
- Only women's ODI: 11 August 2010: Ireland v Netherlands
- As of 16 March 2018; Source: CricketArchive

New Williamfield No. 1 Oval is a cricket ground in Stirling, Scotland. The ground is owned and used by Stirling County Cricket Club.

The first recorded match held on the ground came in 2007 when Stirling County played West Lothian. The ground was neutral host to a Women's One Day International in 2010 when Ireland Women played the Netherlands Women.

In June 2014, Stirling will become the home of Scottish cricket after an agreement between Stirling County Cricket Club, Cricket Scotland and Stirling Council. It is hoped that the redevelopment of the ground will start at end 2014 with the intention being to upgrade it to international match standards. Scotland will play the majority of their home international games at the ground, starting with the 2015 ICC World Twenty20 Qualifiers. The tournament is from 9 to 26 July across eight Ireland and Scotland venues.

The development will see a new pavilion and indoor training facility built at New Williamfield, the home of Stirling County Cricket Club, with Cricket Scotland relocating its headquarters from the National Cricket Academy at Ravelston, Edinburgh. New Williamfield No.1 Oval was the selected venue for two ODI matches of the Netherlands Women tour of Scotland in 2026.
