= Diane Pedgrift =

Scottish cricketer (born 1988)

Personal information
- Born: 10 May 1988 (age 36)
- Batting: Right-handed
- Role: Wicket-keeper

International information
- National side: Scotland
- Source: Cricinfo, 2 January 2018

Diane Pedgrift (born 10 May 1988) is a Scottish woman cricketer. She was a member of the Scottish cricket team at the 2008 Women's Cricket World Cup Qualifier. She is also a member of the Arbroath United Cricket Club.
