= Fiona Campbell (cricketer) =

Scottish cricketer (born 1981)

Personal information
- Born: 29 June 1981 (age 45); Aberdeen, Scotland
- Batting: Right-handed
- Bowling: Leg break
- Role: All-rounder

International information
- National side: Scotland (2003–2003)
- ODI debut (cap 14): 21 July 2003 v Netherlands
- Last ODI: 26 July 2003 v Ireland

Career statistics
Competition	ODI
Matches	4
Runs scored	5
Batting average	1.66
100s/50s	0/0
Top score	3
Balls bowled	102
Wickets	5
Bowling average	13.60
5 wickets in innings	0
10 wickets in match	0
Best bowling	4/25
Catches/stumpings	1/–
- Source: Cricinfo, 22 September 2020

Fiona Campbell (born 29 June 1981) is a Scottish cricketer who has represented her country in several international matches.

Campbell is a leg spin bowler who bats low down the order and has been known to keep wicket on occasion. She made her official one day international debut against the Netherlands women on 21 July 2003. She held the record for the best innings figures for the Scottish women's cricket team for five years, taking 4 for 25 against Japan on 25 July 2003 at Den Haag in the Netherlands.

Born at Aberdeen, Campbell worked as the branch manager for Enterprise vehicle hire in Aberdeen airport.
