= Beth MacGregor =

English cricketer (born 1993)

Personal information
- Full name: Elizabeth MacGregor
- Born: 5 November 1993 (age 33); Leytonstone, Greater London, England
- Batting: Left-handed
- Bowling: Left-arm medium
- Role: All-rounder

International information
- National side: England (2010)
- T20I debut (cap 26): 19 November 2010 v Sri Lanka
- Last T20I: 22 November 2010 v Sri Lanka

Domestic team information
- Years: Team
- 2008–2013: Essex

Career statistics
Competition	WT20I	WLA	WT20
Matches	3	44	19
Runs scored	0	850	186
Batting average	–	25.00	13.28
100s/50s	0/0	1/2	0/0
Top score	0*	108*	30
Balls bowled	54	1,815	281
Wickets	1	28	10
Bowling average	42.00	40.39	22.80
5 wickets in innings	0	0	0
10 wickets in match	–	–	–
Best bowling	1/18	4/1	3/6
Catches/stumpings	1/–	9/–	4/–
- Source: CricketArchive, 5 March 2021

Elizabeth "Beth" MacGregor (born 11 May 1993) is an English former cricketer who played as an all-rounder. She was a left-handed batter and left-arm medium bowler. She appeared in three Twenty20 Internationals for England, all against Sri Lanka in November 2010. She also appeared for England Academy between 2009 and 2012. She played county cricket for Essex between 2008 and 2013.

MacGregor replaced Anya Shrubsole in the England squad for the One Day International series against New Zealand in England in July 2010 having travelled with the Academy side to Bangalore in March. She was part of the England squad which toured Sri Lanka in 2010 and made her Twenty20 International debut on 19 November at Nondescripts Cricket Club Ground, Colombo.

She studied at Chigwell School.
