= Maxime Entrop =

Dutch cricketer

Personal information
- Full name: Maxime Danique Romy Entrop
- Born: 6 November 1992 (age 34); The Hague, Netherlands
- Batting: Right-handed
- Bowling: Right-arm medium

International information
- National side: Netherlands (2011–2012)
- T20I debut (cap 24): 15 August 2011 v Ireland
- Last T20I: 20 August 2011 v Ireland

Career statistics
Competition	WT20I
Matches	2
Runs scored	5
Batting average	–
100s/50s	0/0
Top score	5*
Balls bowled	6
Wickets	0
Bowling average	–
5 wickets in innings	–
10 wickets in match	–
Best bowling	–
Catches/stumpings	0/–
- Source: CricketArchive, 28 June 2015

Maxime Danique Romy Entrop (born 6 November 1992) is a former Dutch international cricketer who played for the Dutch national side between 2011 and 2012.

Born in The Hague, Entrop is the daughter of Peter Entrop, who played for the Dutch men's team at the 1979, 1982, and 1986 ICC Trophies. Her own international debut for the Netherlands came at the 2011 European T20 Championship, where she played against Scotland and Ireland. The match against Ireland held Twenty20 International (T20I) status, and Entrop also played in a second T20I match against Ireland the following month, which was not part of the tournament. She was also named in the Dutch squad for the 2011 World Cup Qualifier later in the year, playing in two of her team's six matches at the tournament (both against the United States). Entrop's final international appearances to date came at the 2012 ICC Europe T20 Qualifier.
