= Alarda Mol =

Dutch cricketer

Personal information
- Full name: Alarda Catharina Mol
- Born: 20 January 1982 (age 44); The Hague, Netherlands
- Batting: Right-handed
- Bowling: Right-arm slow

International information
- National side: Netherlands (2009–2011)
- ODI debut (cap 77): 5 August 2009 v Ireland
- Last ODI: 29 April 2011 v Sri Lanka
- T20I debut (cap 17): 6 August 2009 v Ireland
- Last T20I: 24 April 2011 v Pakistan

Career statistics
Competition	WODI	WT20I
Matches	4	3
Runs scored	9	9
Batting average	2.25	4.50
100s/50s	0/0	0/0
Top score	4	9
Catches/stumpings	1/–	0/–
- Source: CricketArchive, 19 November 2015

Alarda Catharina Mol (born 20 January 1982) is a former Dutch international cricketer whose career for the Dutch national side spanned from 2009 to 2011.

Born in The Hague, Mol made both her One Day International (ODI) and Twenty20 International debuts for the Netherlands in August 2009, against Ireland. Her only other appearances in those formats came in a four-team tournament played in Colombo, Sri Lanka, in April 2011. Mol had little success in her international career, averaging under five runs per innings in both ODIs and Twenty20 Internationals.

== See also ==
- List of Netherlands women ODI cricketers
- List of Netherlands women Twenty20 International cricketers
