= Catherine Smaill =

Scottish cricketer (born 1991)

Personal information
- Born: April 28, 1991 (age 34); Cardiff, Wales

International information
- National side: Scotland
- Source: Cricinfo, 3 December 2017

Catherine Smaill (born 28 April 1991) is a Scottish woman cricketer. She made her international cricket debut for Scotland in the 2008 Women's Cricket World Cup Qualifier at the age of 17.

Smaill is currently serving as a physiotherapist for some of the current disability cricket teams especially for the England physically disabled cricket team. She was instrumental in England's triumph in the inaugural edition of the International physical disability cricket tournament held in Dhaka, Bangladesh in 2015. She has been involved with the physically disabled cricket and deaf cricket as a physiotherapist since 2013, after a short stint with Scotland women's cricket team at the international level.
