= Melissa Scott-Hayward =

Irish cricketer (born 1990)

Personal information
- Full name: Melissa Erica Maria O'Carroll Scott-Hayward
- Born: 10 August 1990 (age 36); Dublin, Ireland
- Batting: Right-handed
- Bowling: Right-arm medium
- Role: All-rounder

International information
- National side: Ireland (2008–2014)
- ODI debut (cap 57): 24 June 2008 v West Indies
- Last ODI: 14 January 2014 v South Africa
- T20I debut (cap 10): 27 June 2008 v West Indies
- Last T20I: 3 April 2014 v Bangladesh

Domestic team information
- Years: Team
- 2015: Typhoons

Career statistics
Competition	WODI	WT20I	WLA	WT20
Matches	26	22	51	36
Runs scored	219	104	462	376
Batting average	9.52	6.11	12.15	16.34
100s/50s	0/0	0/0	0/1	0/1
Top score	23	16	57	97*
Balls bowled	224	116	660	166
Wickets	3	3	21	7
Bowling average	65.66	50.33	19.71	27.85
5 wickets in innings	0	0	1	0
10 wickets in match	0	0	0	0
Best bowling	1/27	1/16	5/12	2/8
Catches/stumpings	9/–	6/–	17/–	8/–
- Source: CricketArchive, 28 May 2021

Melissa Erica Maria O'Carroll Scott-Hayward (born 10 August 1990) is an Irish former cricketer who played as a right-handed batter and right-arm medium bowler. She appeared in 26 One Day Internationals and 22 Twenty20 Internationals for Ireland between 2008 and 2014. She played in the 2015 Women's Super 3s for Typhoons.
