= Laura Cullen =

Irish cricketer (born 1989)

Personal information
- Full name: Laura Frances Mary Cullen
- Born: 16 October 1989 (age 37); Dublin, Ireland
- Batting: Right-handed
- Bowling: Right-arm medium-fast
- Role: Bowler

International information
- National side: Ireland (2011–2012)
- ODI debut (cap 66): 26 April 2011 v Netherlands
- Last ODI: 24 June 2012 v India
- T20I debut (cap 22): 24 April 2011 v Pakistan
- Last T20I: 23 June 2012 v England

Career statistics
Competition	WODI	WT20I	WLA	WT20
Matches	6	5	15	8
Runs scored	18	–	35	–
Batting average	6.00	–	5.83	–
100s/50s	0/0	–	0/0	–
Top score	9	–	9	–
Balls bowled	180	30	442	69
Wickets	7	2	10	4
Bowling average	20.42	10.50	30.50	8.25
5 wickets in innings	0	0	0	0
10 wickets in match	0	0	0	0
Best bowling	3/51	1/10	3/51	2/4
Catches/stumpings	0/–	0/–	1/–	0/–
- Source: CricketArchive, 1 June 2021

Laura Frances Mary Cullen (born 6 October 1989) is an Irish former cricketer who played as a right-arm medium-fast bowler. She appeared in 6 One Day Internationals and 5 Twenty20 Internationals for Ireland in 2011 and 2012.
