= Kari Anderson =

Scottish cricketer

Personal information
- Full name: Kari Anderson
- Born: 21 October 1982 (age 44); Stirling, Scotland
- Batting: Right-handed
- Bowling: Right-arm medium
- Role: Bowler

International information
- National side: Scotland (2000–2015)
- ODI debut (cap 1): 10 August 2001 v England
- Last ODI: 26 July 2003 v Ireland

Career statistics
Competition	ODI
Matches	8
Runs scored	133
Batting average	16.62
100s/50s	0/0
Top score	46
Balls bowled	324
Wickets	8
Bowling average	40.05
5 wickets in innings	0
10 wickets in match	0
Best bowling	3/65
Catches/stumpings	4/–
- Source: Cricinfo, 17 February, 2016

Kari Carswell also known as Kari Anderson (born 21 October 1982) is a former Scottish cricketer and coach who was the former captain of the Scotland women's national cricket team. She had established a playing and coaching career with Scotland women's cricket team spanning for over two decades. She has received 152 caps in her professional career representing Scotland for 17 years.

She also holds the unique distinction of being part of Scotland women's first international cricket match, as well as serving as coach as well as captain of the Scotland women's cricket team simultaneously at the same time. In addition, she also served as Cricket Scotland's women's development manager. She has also coached New Zealand women at international level. As of June 2021, she is currently serving as the head of women's cricket for both MCC and Middlesex Cricket.

== Biography ==
She currently resides in New Zealand. Her husband Andrew Carswell also played professional cricket.

== Career ==
She was part of the first ever Scottish women ODI team when she made her WODI debut on 10 August 2001 against England during the 2001 Women's European Cricket Championship at the age of 18. She opened the batting in that match but only managed to score 2 runs and Scotland was bowled out for just 24. On 21 July 2003, in an ODI against Netherlands, she became the youngest ever Scottish women's cricket team captain at the age of 20 years and 373 days and also became the second youngest ever captain in WODIs. She ended up as the Scotland's joint leading runscorer at the 2005 Women's European Cricket Championship along with Annette Drummond.

She played 8 WODIs for the Scotland between 2000 and 2003. She was a right-handed batsman and right arm medium pace bowler. She took 8 wickets at 40.05 and scored 133 runs with a best of 46 in her short WODI career as Scotland had lost the ODI status which also subsequently hampered the opportunities for her to play in official matches with international status. However, she continued to play List A, T20 matches and unofficial matches for Scotland until 2017. She also played club cricket for Stirling County Cricket Club. She also became the first Scotland woman cricketer to feature in 150 professional matches. She was part of the Scottish squad which finished at 6th place at the 2008 Women's Cricket World Cup Qualifier.

She initially moved to New Zealand on a two-year work visa. However, she returned to Scotland in no time and was soon appointed as the head coach of Scotland national women's cricket team.

In 2011, she became Scotland women's first women's cricket manager and was player-cum-coach for 2015 ICC Women's World Twenty20 Qualifier where they came fourth. In January 2016, she stepped down from the role of head coach of Scotland women after serving in the position for five years and she was subsequently replaced by her successor Steven Knox as the head coach of the Scotland women's national cricket team. In addition, she worked as the head coach of the Scotland U17 women's team for a brief stint of two years. She then moved to New Zealand and joined the Northern Districts Association in September 2016 initially started off as the female pathway manager of Northern Districts side. She returned to Scottish team to play at the 2017 Women's Cricket World Cup Qualifier.

In February 2017, Anderson retired from international cricket at the age of 34, following Scotland's exit from the 2017 Women's Cricket World Cup Qualifier. In the tournament, she was the highest run-scorer for Scotland, with 111 runs.

After serving as the pathway manager of Northern Districts club she was promoted as amateur cricket manager of the club. When she was appointed as the head coach of Northern Districts and Northern Spirit, she became the first ever full-time women's domestic coach in New Zealand as well as the first female pathway manager in New Zealand. In 2020, she quit the job of coaching the Northern Districts team in order to take up the role of New Zealand women's cricket team head coach. She was also instrumental in establishing the Northern Premier League. She also coaches the New Zealand U19 women's cricket team.

In June 2021, Abbi Aitken-Drummond equalled her record as Scotland's most capped women's player at professional cricket with 151 caps. On 24 June 2021, she was appointed as the head of the women's cricket for both MCC and Middlesex Cricket.
