= Julie van der Flier =

Irish cricketer (born 1997)

Personal information
- Full name: Julie Aleida Eileen van der Flier
- Born: 24 February 1997 (age 29); Dublin, Ireland
- Batting: Right-handed
- Bowling: Right-arm medium
- Role: All-rounder; occasional wicket-keeper

International information
- National side: Ireland (2011)
- Only ODI (cap 70): 29 April 2011 v Pakistan

Career statistics
Competition	WODI	WLA
Matches	1	3
Runs scored	0	0
Batting average	–	–
100s/50s	0/0	0/0
Top score	0*	0*
Balls bowled	–	18
Wickets	–	1
Bowling average	–	7.00
5 wickets in innings	–	0
10 wickets in match	–	0
Best bowling	–	1/7
Catches/stumpings	0/–	1/0
- Source: CricketArchive, 1 June 2021

Juliana Aleida Eileen van der Flier (born 24 February 1997) is an Irish former cricketer who played as a right-handed batter, right-arm medium bowler and occasional wicket-keeper. She appeared in one One Day International for Ireland in 2011, against Pakistan at the age of 14.
