= Emma Flanagan =

Irish cricketer (born 1991)

Personal information
- Full name: Emma Louise Carolyn Flanagan
- Born: 7 January 1991 (age 35); Dublin, Ireland
- Batting: Right-handed
- Bowling: Right-arm off break
- Role: Batter

International information
- National side: Ireland (2011–2014)
- ODI debut (cap 67): 26 April 2011 v Netherlands
- Last ODI: 14 January 2014 v South Africa
- T20I debut (cap 23): 24 April 2011 v Pakistan
- Last T20I: 27 March 2014 v Australia

Domestic team information
- Years: Team
- 2015: Typhoons

Career statistics
Competition	WODI	WT20I	WLA	WT20
Matches	9	7	18	10
Runs scored	32	35	77	43
Batting average	4.00	5.00	5.13	5.37
100s/50s	0/0	0/0	0/0	0/0
Top score	12	12	21	12
Balls bowled	–	–	18	–
Wickets	–	–	1	–
Bowling average	–	–	16.00	–
5 wickets in innings	–	–	0	–
10 wickets in match	–	–	0	–
Best bowling	–	–	1/3	–
Catches/stumpings	1/–	0/–	3/–	0/–
- Source: CricketArchive, 28 May 2021

Emma Louise Carolyn Flanagan (born 7 January 1991) is an Irish former cricketer who played as a right-handed batter. She appeared in 9 One Day Internationals and 7 Twenty20 Internationals for Ireland between 2011 and 2014. She was also in the Typhoons squad for 2015 Women's Super 3s.
