= Charlotte Bascombe =

Scottish cricketer (born 1987)

Personal information
- Born: 3 January 1987 (age 39); Newcastle-under-Lyme, Staffordshire, England
- Batting: Right-handed
- Role: Wicket-keeper

International information
- National side: Scotland
- Source: Cricinfo, 19 November 2017

Charlotte Bascombe (born 3 January 1987) is a former Scottish woman cricketer. She represented Scotland in the 2008 Women's Cricket World Cup Qualifier.

Bascombe became the first woman cricketer to have played for a men's first XI team in Scotland.
