= Rebecca Rolfe (cricketer) =

Irish cricketer (born 1986)

Personal information
- Full name: Rebecca Alana Rolfe
- Born: 27 November 1986 (age 39); Dublin, Ireland
- Batting: Right-handed
- Role: Batter

International information
- National side: Ireland (2011–2014)
- ODI debut (cap 69): 26 April 2011 v Netherlands
- Last ODI: 14 January 2014 v South Africa
- T20I debut (cap 25): 24 April 2011 v Pakistan
- Last T20I: 22 January 2014 v South Africa

Domestic team information
- Years: Team
- 2017: Typhoons

Career statistics
Competition	WODI	WT20I	WLA	WT20
Matches	8	2	29	7
Runs scored	9	4	278	54
Batting average	1.28	4.00	12.63	13.50
100s/50s	0/0	0/0	0/0	0/0
Top score	4	3	48*	34
Catches/stumpings	0/–	1/–	3/–	2/–
- Source: CricketArchive, 27 May 2021

Rebecca Alana Rolfe (born 27 November 1986) is an Irish former cricketer who played as a right-handed batter. She appeared in 8 One Day Internationals and 2 Twenty20 Internationals for Ireland between 2011 and 2014. She played in the 2017 Women's Super 3s for Typhoons.
