= Caroline Sweetman =

Scottish cricketer (born 1983)

Personal information
- Full name: Caroline Jane Sweetman
- Born: 23 July 1983 (age 43); Edinburgh, Midlothian
- Batting: Right-handed
- Bowling: Right-arm slow
- Role: Batter

International information
- National side: Scotland (2001–2010)
- ODI debut (cap 9): 10 August 2001 v England
- Last ODI: 26 July 2003 v Ireland

Domestic team information
- Years: Team
- 2011: Glasgow Academicals Women

Career statistics
Competition	ODI
Matches	4
Runs scored	4
Batting average	1.33
100s/50s	0/0
Top score	4
Catches/stumpings	2/–
- Source: Cricinfo, 22 September 2020

Caroline Jane Sweetman (born 23 July 1983) is a former Scottish international cricketer whose career for the Scottish national side spanned from 2001 to 2010. She had played 4 women's one-day internationals. She was born at Edinburgh.
