= Samantha Haggo =

Scottish cricketer (born 1992)

Personal information
- Full name: Samantha Haggo
- Born: 4 November 1992 (age 34); Irvine, North Ayrshire, Scotland
- Batting: Right-handed
- Bowling: Right-arm medium

International information
- National side: Scotland
- T20I debut (cap 14): 26 June 2019 v Netherlands
- Last T20I: 15 July 2023 v Netherlands
- Source: Cricinfo, 30 May 2025

Samantha Haggo (born 4 November 1992) is a Scottish cricketer. She played in four matches for the Scotland women's national cricket team in the 2015 ICC Women's World Twenty20 Qualifier in November and December 2015. In May 2019, she was named in Scotland's squad for the 2019 ICC Women's Qualifier Europe tournament in Spain. She made her Women's Twenty20 International (WT20I) debut for Scotland against the Netherlands on 26 June 2019.
