= Carlijn de Groot =

Dutch cricketer

Personal information
- Full name: Carlijn Marjolijn de Groot
- Born: 10 September 1986 (age 40); Schiedam, Netherlands
- Batting: Right-handed
- Bowling: Right-arm medium
- Role: Batter

International information
- National side: Netherlands (2007–2012)
- ODI debut (cap 73): 4 August 2007 v South Africa
- Last ODI: 24 November 2011 v Ireland
- T20I debut (cap 3): 1 July 2008 v West Indies
- Last T20I: 20 August 2011 v Ireland

Career statistics
Competition	ODI	T20I
Matches	15	8
Runs scored	92	66
Batting average	6.13	9.42
100s/50s	0/0	0/0
Top score	21	23
Catches/stumpings	1/–	1/–
- Source: CricketArchive, 19 November 2015

Carlijn Marjolijn de Groot (born 10 September 1986) is a former Dutch international cricketer whose career for the Dutch national team spanned from 2007 to 2012.

De Groot was born in Schiedam, and played her club cricket for Hermes-DVS, which is based in the city. She made her international debut for the Netherlands in August 2007, playing two One Day International (ODI) matches against the touring South Africans. Her Twenty20 International debut came the following year, against the West Indies. In total, de Groot played fifteen ODIs and eight Twenty20 Internationals before the Netherlands lost its status in those formats in late 2011. Her final international match to date came against Ireland at the 2012 ICC Europe T20 Qualifier.
