= Abbi Aitken-Drummond =

Scottish cricketer (born 1991)

Personal information
- Born: 11 April 1991 (age 35); Dundee, Scotland
- Batting: Right-handed
- Bowling: Right-arm medium
- Role: All-rounder
- Relatives: Annette Drummond (wife); Gordon Drummond (brother-in-law)

International information
- National side: Scotland
- ODI debut (cap 35): 6 August 2024 v Papua New Guinea
- Last ODI: 12 August 2024 v Netherlands
- T20I debut (cap 1): 7 July 2018 v Uganda
- Last T20I: 16 August 2024 v Netherlands
- T20I shirt no.: 91
- Source: Cricinfo, 16 October 2024

Abbi Aitken-Drummond (née Aitken; born 11 April 1991) is a Scottish international cricketer. She plays for the Scotland Women cricket team as a right-handed batsman and right arm medium pace bowler. She was one of the youngest members of the team for ICC World Cup Qualifiers in Stellenbosch in 2008.

She was the captain of her national team. She led Scotland to 2015 ICC Women's World Twenty20 Qualifier where they came fourth. On 31 October 2017, she stood down as captain of the national team.

In June 2018, she was named in Scotland's squad for the 2018 ICC Women's World Twenty20 Qualifier tournament. She made her Women's Twenty20 International (WT20I) debut for Scotland against Uganda in the World Twenty20 Qualifier on 7 July 2018.

In August 2019, she was named in Scotland's squad for the 2019 ICC Women's World Twenty20 Qualifier tournament in Scotland. In January 2022, she was named in Scotland's team for the 2022 Commonwealth Games Cricket Qualifier tournament in Malaysia.

In September 2024 she was named in the Scotland squad for the 2024 ICC Women's T20 World Cup.

Aikten-Drumnond was part of the Scotland squad for the 2025 Women's Cricket World Cup Qualifier in Pakistan in April 2025.

== Personal life ==
Aitken-Drummond identifies as bisexual. She married former Scotland player Annette Drummond in June 2019.
