= Esther Lanser =

New Zealand cricketer (born 1984)

Personal information
- Born: 6 January 1984 (age 42); Masterton, New Zealand
- Batting: Right-handed
- Bowling: Right-arm off spin
- Role: All-rounder

International information
- National side: Netherlands (2010–2011)
- ODI debut (cap 78): 11 August 2010 v Ireland
- Last ODI: 24 November 2011 v Ireland
- T20I debut (cap 19): 14 October 2010 v South Africa
- Last T20I: 20 August 2011 v Ireland

Domestic team information
- Years: Team
- 2009–2012: Central Districts

Career statistics
Competition	WODI	WT20I
Matches	14	6
Runs scored	236	104
Batting average	18.15	20.80
100s/50s	0/1	0/1
Top score	75	55
Balls bowled	634	138
Wickets	14	2
Bowling average	28.92	80.50
5 wickets in innings	0	0
10 wickets in match	0	0
Best bowling	2/13	1/21
Catches/stumpings	3/–	0/–
- Source: ESPNCricinfo, 19 November 2015

Esther Lanser (born 6 January 1984) is a former Dutch international cricketer who played for the Dutch national side between 2010 and 2011. She was born and raised in New Zealand, and continued to play for Central Districts, a New Zealand domestic team, throughout her time with the Netherlands.

Lanser was born in Masterton, in New Zealand's Wellington Region, and attended Wairarapa College. She made her debut for Central Districts in New Zealand's State League during the 2008–09 season, and quickly established herself in the side. In 2010, Lanser was invited to play for the Netherlands in the Women's County Championship, qualifying for the team by virtue of being a Dutch passport holder. She was subsequently named in the Dutch squad for the 2010 European Championship, making her One Day International (ODI) debut against Ireland.

Later in the year, Lanser played in the 2010 ICC Women's Challenge in South Africa, where she made her Twenty20 International debut. In the team's loss to Pakistan in the ODI section of the tournament, she was named man of the match, after taking 2/22 from 10 overs and scoring 75 runs opening the batting. Lanser's second and final major international tournament for the Netherlands was the 2011 World Cup Qualifier in Bangladesh, where she played four matches.
