= Evelien Gerrits =

Dutch cricketer

Personal information
- Born: 17 January 1985 (age 41)
- Batting: Right-handed
- Bowling: Right-arm medium-fast
- Role: Bowler

International information
- National side: Netherlands (2009–2011)
- ODI debut (cap 76): 5 August 2009 v Ireland
- Last ODI: 26 April 2011 v Ireland
- T20I debut (cap 16): 6 August 2009 v Ireland
- Last T20I: 20 August 2011 v Ireland

Career statistics
Competition	WODI	WT20I
Matches	3	7
Runs scored	11	2
Batting average	11.00	–
100s/50s	0/0	0/0
Top score	6*	2*
Balls bowled	72	128
Wickets	1	3
Bowling average	51.00	54.33
5 wickets in innings	0	0
10 wickets in match	0	0
Best bowling	1/25	3/13
Catches/stumpings	0/–	0/–
- Source: CricketArchive, 19 November 2015

Evelien Gerrits (born 17 January 1985) is a former Dutch international cricketer whose career for the Dutch national side spanned from 2009 to 2011.

Gerrits made her One Day International (ODI) and Twenty20 International debuts for the Netherlands in consecutive days, with both coming against Ireland in August 2009. The following year, she played several matches at the 2010 ICC Women's Challenge, though with little success. A right-arm pace bowler, Gerrits' best performance for the Netherlands came in April 2011, in a Twenty20 International against Pakistan. Opening the bowling, she dismissed Nida Dar from the first ball of the match, and finished with figures of 3/13, the best by a Dutchwoman in a Twenty20 International. Gerrits took only one wicket across her ODI and T20I career, with her final international coming against Ireland in August 2011.
