= Marloes Braat =

Dutch cricketer (born 1990)

Personal information
- Full name: Daniëlle Marloes Braat
- Born: 6 April 1990 (age 36); Vlaardingen, Netherlands
- Batting: Right-handed
- Bowling: Right-arm medium
- Role: Bowler
- Relatives: Sebastiaan Braat (brother)

International information
- National side: Netherlands (2006–2022)
- Only Test (cap 1): 28 July 2007 v South Africa
- ODI debut (cap 68): 22 August 2006 v Ireland
- Last ODI: 29 April 2011 v Sri Lanka
- T20I debut (cap 1): 1 July 2008 v West Indies
- Last T20I: 28 June 2022 v Namibia

Career statistics
Competition	WTest	WODI	WT20I	WLA
Matches	1	19	9	50
Runs scored	6	72	18	335
Batting average	6.00	5.53	6.00	10.15
100s/50s	0/0	0/0	0/0	0/0
Top score	4	14*	10*	34
Balls bowled	15	691	129	1,977
Wickets	2	12	5	41
Bowling average	5.50	40.50	25.20	26.80
5 wickets in innings	0	0	0	0
10 wickets in match	0	0	0	0
Best bowling	2/11	3/39	2/21	4/8
Catches/stumpings	0/–	1/–	0/–	4/–
- Source: CricketArchive, 3 December 2021

Daniëlle Marloes Braat (born 6 April 1990) is a Dutch cricketer who plays as a right-arm medium bowler. She has played for the Netherlands since 2006, including appearing for the side in their only Test match. Her younger brother, Sebastiaan Braat, has represented the Dutch men's team.

She was named in the Dutch team for the 2021 Women's Cricket World Cup Qualifier tournament in Zimbabwe.
