= Kathryn White (cricketer) =

Scottish cricketer (born 1978)

Personal information
- Full name: Kathryn White
- Born: 27 July 1978 (age 48); Stirling, Scotland
- Batting: Right-handed
- Bowling: Right-arm medium-fast
- Role: All-rounder

International information
- National side: Scotland (2000–2013)
- ODI debut (cap 11): 10 August 2001 v England
- Last ODI: 26 July 2003 v Ireland

Career statistics
Competition	ODI
Matches	8
Runs scored	84
Batting average	10.50
100s/50s	0/0
Top score	23
Balls bowled	420
Wickets	5
Bowling average	44.00
5 wickets in innings	0
10 wickets in match	0
Best bowling	2/28
Catches/stumpings	1/–
- Source: Cricinfo, 22 September 2020

Kathryn White (born 27 July 1978) is a former Scottish international cricketer whose career for the Scottish national side spanned from 2001 to 2013. She had played 8 women's one-day internationals.

White was born at Stirling in 1978.
