= Denise van Deventer =

Dutch cricketer (born 1990)

Personal information
- Full name: Denise van Deventer (née Hannema)
- Born: 9 December 1990 (age 35); Amsterdam, Netherlands
- Batting: Left-handed
- Bowling: Right-arm medium
- Role: Middle order batter

International information
- National side: Netherlands (2008–2019)
- ODI debut (cap 74): 2 July 2008 v West Indies
- Last ODI: 24 November 2011 v Ireland
- T20I debut (cap 5): 1 July 2008 v West Indies
- Last T20I: 7 September 2019 v Scotland

Career statistics
Competition	WODI	WT20I	WLA	WT20
Matches	18	10	56	28
Runs scored	128	30	931	222
Batting average	10.66	7.50	22.70	15.85
100s/50s	0/0	0/0	0/4	0/0
Top score	16	12	90*	38
Balls bowled	86	42	308	128
Wickets	1	1	7	5
Bowling average	60.00	45.00	27.00	21.40
5 wickets in innings	0	0	0	0
10 wickets in match	0	0	0	0
Best bowling	1/7	1/17	4/10	2/16
Catches/stumpings	2/–	1/–	15/–	9/–
- Source: Cricinfo, 7 September 2019

Denise van Deventer (née Hannema) (born 9 December 1990) is a Dutch international cricketer who debuted for the Dutch national team in 2008, and was appointed its captain in 2015. In June 2018, she was named in the Netherlands' squad for the 2018 ICC Women's World Twenty20 Qualifier tournament. In August 2019, she was named in the Dutch squad for the 2019 ICC Women's World Twenty20 Qualifier tournament in Scotland.
