= Women's European Cricket Championship =

ICC Europe Women's Championship
- Administrator: International Cricket Council
- First edition: 1989
- Tournament format: Round Robin
- Current champion: Ireland (3rd title)
- Most successful: England (5 titles)

The Women's European Cricket Championship was a women's cricket tournament for teams representing European countries. The first edition was contested in 1989.

== History ==
The first Women's European Championship was held in Denmark in July 1989. The teams that took part were England, Ireland and the Netherlands in addition to the hosts Denmark. England won all three of their matches, with the other teams winning one match each. England thus won the tournament. All matches were official Women's One-Day Internationals and Denmark's match against Ireland was their first such game.

The second edition was held in Leicester, Nottingham and Northamptonshire in England in July 1990. The same teams as 1989 again competed, and England again won all their games. Ireland won two matches, the Netherlands one and Denmark lost all three of their games. After the initial group stage, England and Ireland played in a final, which England won by 65 runs.

The third Championship, again featuring the same four teams, was played in Haarlem in the Netherlands in July 1991. Like the 1989 event, England again won all three of their games, with the other three teams winning one each. Denmark finished second on run rate and met England in the final, which was won by England by 179 runs.

After a four-year break, the Championship returned in July 1995 in Dublin. The same teams took part as in the previous three tournaments, with England and Ireland topping the points table for the group stage. England beat Ireland by seven wickets in the final.

In 1999, the tournament returned to the venue of the first edition, again with the same four teams. England topped the table after the group stage, winning all three of their games, winning the tournament as no final was played. Denmark's game against the Netherlands is their last Women's ODI to date.

The 2001 tournament, played at Bradfield College, England saw an England Under-19 team replace England. Despite England being represented by their Under-19 team, their matches still counted as official Women's ODIs for England. Scotland replaced Denmark in the event, and their match against England was their first Women's ODI. Ireland won the event, winning all three of their games, the first time England had not won the tournament.

The 2005 event was held in Wales, and saw the first appearance of the Welsh women's team. An England development squad replaced the England Under-19 team. Only the match between Ireland and the Netherlands was an official women's ODI. England won all four of their matches, thus winning the tournament.

The tournament became biannual in 2007, when was held in Netherlands. England sent a Development team, which won the championship. Also participated Ireland, Netherlands and Scotland.

The 2009 Tournament was held in Dublín, Ireland in three grounds, in this event took part Ireland, Netherlands and Scotland. Ireland won the championship after won their two games. Also will play the first T20 European championship.

== Summary ==
Year	Host	Champion	Runner-up	Third place	Fourth place	Fifth place	Ref
1989	Denmark	England	Denmark	Netherlands	Ireland	no fifth team	
1990	England	England	Ireland	Netherlands	Denmark	no fifth team	
1991	Netherlands	England	Denmark	Ireland	Netherlands	no fifth team	
1995	Ireland	England	Ireland	Netherlands	Denmark	no fifth team	
1999	Denmark	England	Ireland	Denmark	Netherlands	no fifth team	
2001	England	Ireland	England (Note: At the 2001 edition of the tournament, England was represented by the national under-19 team.)	Netherlands	Scotland	no fifth team	
2005	Wales	England (Note: At the 2005, 2009, and 2010 editions of the tournament, England was represented by a development squad.)	Ireland	Wales	Netherlands	Scotland	
2007	Netherlands	England	Ireland	Netherlands	Scotland	no fifth team	
2009	Ireland	Ireland	Netherlands	Scotland	no fourth team	no fifth team	
2010	Scotland	England	Netherlands	Ireland	Scotland	no fifth team	
2011	Netherlands	Netherlands	Ireland	Scotland	no fourth team	no fifth team	
2014	England	Ireland	Netherlands	Scotland	no fourth team	no fifth team	

== Participations ==
Teams	1st	2nd	3rd	4th	5th
Denmark	0	2	1	2	0
England	5	0	0	0	0
England Development Squad	3	0	0	0	0
England Under-19s	0	1	0	0	0
Ireland	3	6	2	1	0
Netherlands	1	3	5	3	0
Scotland	0	0	3	3	1
Wales	0	0	1	0	0

== See also ==
- European Cricket Championship
- ICC Europe
- European Cricket Council
- Women's European Cricket Series
- European Affiliates Championship
- Central Europe Cup
- it:Campionati_europei_di_cricket_T10_femminile
- it:Campionati_europei_di_cricket_T10_maschile
