= Violet Wattenberg =

Dutch cricketer (born 1978)

Personal information
- Full name: Violet Cornelia Elizabeth Wattenberg
- Born: 5 December 1978 (age 47); Goa, India
- Batting: Right-handed
- Role: Wicket-keeper

International information
- National side: Netherlands (2007–2011)
- Only Test (cap 11): 28 July 2007 v South Africa
- ODI debut (cap 72): 2 August 2007 v South Africa
- Last ODI: 17 August 2011 v Ireland
- T20I debut (cap 11): 1 July 2008 v West Indies
- Last T20I: 20 August 2011 v Ireland

Domestic team information
- Years: Team
- 2008: Warwickshire

Career statistics
Competition	WTest	WODI	WT20I	WLA
Matches	1	19	11	43
Runs scored	52	179	146	555
Batting average	26.00	9.42	16.22	15.41
100s/50s	0/0	0/0	0/0	0/3
Top score	49	34	25	60
Catches/stumpings	1/2	12/3	3/1	30/11
- Source: CricketArchive, 2 December 2021

Violet Cornelia Elizabeth Wattenberg (born 5 December 1978) is a Dutch former cricketer who played as a right-handed batter and wicket-keeper. She appeared in one Test match, 19 One Day Internationals and 11 Twenty20 Internationals for the Netherlands between 2007 and 2011. In her only Test match, she was the team's highest scorer, including scoring 49 in the first innings. She also spent one season playing for Warwickshire in 2008.
