= Bermuda women's national cricket team =

Bermuda
- Flag of Bermuda
- Association: Bermuda Cricket Board

International Cricket Council
- ICC status: Associate member (1966)
- ICC region: Americas

International cricket
- First international: v. Canada at Victoria; 2 September 2006

One Day Internationals
- Women's World Cup Qualifier appearances: 1 (first in 2008)
- Best result: 8th (2008)

T20 Internationals
T20Is	Played	Won/Lost
Total	0	
This year	0	
- As of 26 January 2023

The Bermuda women's national cricket team represents the British overseas territory of Bermuda in international women's cricket matches. The team made its international debut in 2006 and qualified for the 2008 Women's Cricket World Cup Qualifier, but has played no international matches since 2012.

== History ==
=== Background ===
Women's cricket in Bermuda dates to the late 1930s, when Black Bermudian women excluded from white establishments like tennis clubs established a social cricket competition. In 1943 a cup was donated, but the women's cricket scene later declined. The sport underwent a revival in the 1970s due to sponsorship from local hotels, who sponsored teams made up of their employees.

=== Establishment of national team ===
A women's national squad was established by the Bermuda Cricket Board (BCB) in April 2006. The team made its international debut against Canada in September 2006, playing a three-match 50-over series for the right to represent the ICC Americas region at the 2008 Women's Cricket World Cup Qualifier. Captained by Terry-Lynn Paynter, Bermuda lost the first match by five wickets but rebounded to win the second game by 24 runs and the third by three runs to clinch qualification for the World Cup QUalifier.

At the 2008 World Cup Qualifier in South Africa, Bermuda lost all five of its matches by heavy margins. Against South Africa, Bermuda was dismissed for only 13 runs from 18 overs. Only three batters managed to score, with team captain Linda Mienzer recording one run from 48 deliveries faced, and extras accounting for ten runs. In response, South Africa took only four balls to record a ten-wicket victory.

Bermuda played five matches at the 2012 ICC America's Women's T20 Championship in Cayman Islands, winning only against Brazil. Their match against Cayman Islands was washed out.

=== Disbandment, T20I status and revival ===
By 2015, the national women's squad had been disbanded with efforts underway to re-establish a senior women's league.

In April 2018, the International Cricket Council (ICC) granted full Women's Twenty20 International (WT20I) status to all its members. Therefore, all Twenty20 matches played between Bermuda women and other ICC members after 1 July 2018 have the full WT20I status.

In 2021, the Bermuda Cricket Board (BCB) established a women's cricket development program with three club teams. The BCB announced in 2022 that it had secured sponsorship for the women's team from an insurance firm, as part of its five-year strategic plan. A national women's twenty20 league with at least four clubs was announced in 2023, one of the preconditions for Bermuda to receive invitations to ICC tournaments.

== See also ==
- Bermuda national cricket team
