= List of women's One Day International cricket grounds =

Thirty-three countries have hosted at least one match of women's One Day International cricket.

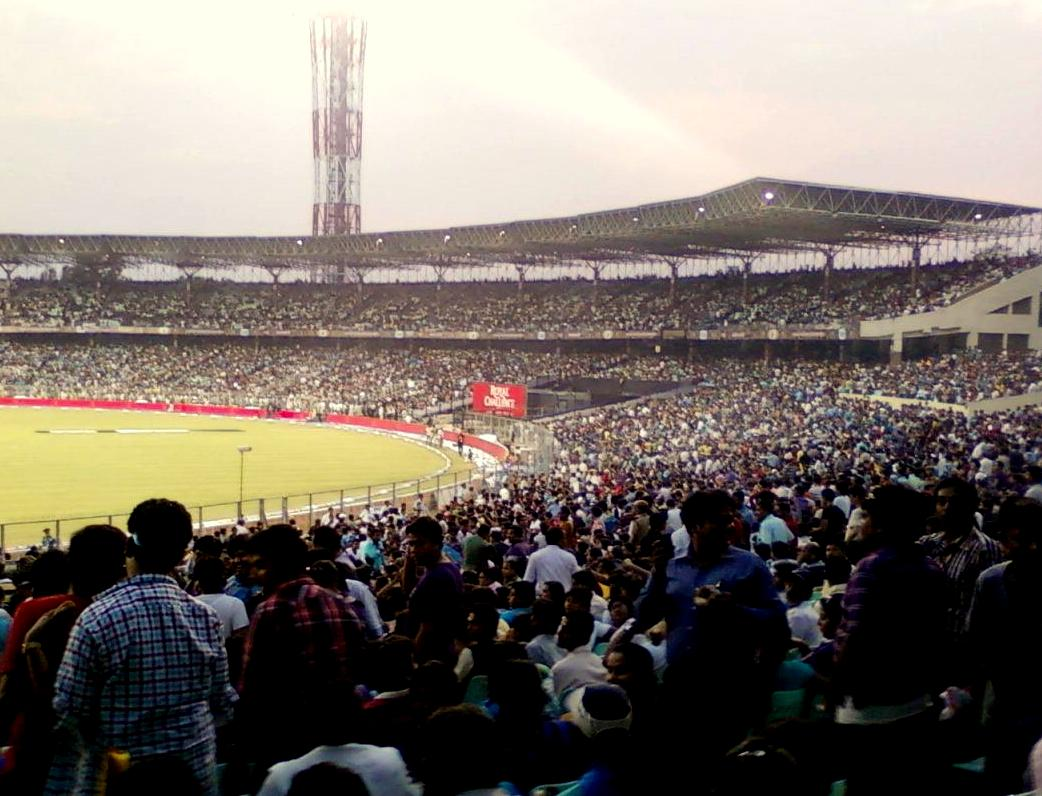
Eden Gardens, Kolkata (pictured in 2013), was the first ground in India to host a women's ODI. The ground hosted the final of the 1997 World Cup, which a crowd of almost 80,000 attended.

As of August 2026, 327 cricket grounds have hosted at least one match of women's One Day International (ODI) cricket. One Day Internationals were the second form of international women's cricket to be introduced, after Test matches. The first women's ODIs were played at the 1973 World Cup, and more than 1,550 women's ODIs have been played since. Thirty-three countries have hosted at least one women's ODI match.

== List of grounds ==
Note: venues marked with a dagger (†) have had matches played on multiple grounds within the venue, but are counted as a single ground for the purposes of this list.
As of 28 October 2026 (WODI 1573):

Ground	City	Country	First match	Last match	No. of ODIs	Refs
Dean Park	Bournemouth	England	23 June 1973	23 June 1973	1	
County Ground	Hove	England	23 June 1973	18 September 2022	8	
Clarence Park	St Albans	England	23 June 1973	23 June 1973	1	
London Road	Tring	England	30 June 1973	30 June 1973	1	
Queen's Park, Chesterfield	Chesterfield	England	30 June 1973	2 July 2011	3	
The Grove	Sittingbourne	England	30 June 1973	30 June 1973	1	
Corfton Road	London	England	4 July 1973	29 July 1993	3	
Hesketh Park	Dartford	England	7 July 1973	7 July 1973	1	
Park Avenue, Bradford	Bradford	England	7 July 1973	7 July 1973	1	
Manor Fields	Bletchley	England	7 July 1973	7 July 1973	1	
Clifton Park	York	England	11 July 1973	11 July 1973	1	
The Maer Ground	Exmouth	England	14 July 1973	14 July 1973	1	
Leicester Ivanhoe Cricket Club Ground	Leicester	England	14 July 1973	20 July 1990	3	
Fenner's Ground	Cambridge	England	14 July 1973	14 July 1973	1	
Valentines Park	London	England	18 July 1973	18 July 1973	1	
Aigburth Cricket Ground	Liverpool	England	18 July 1973	18 July 1973	1	
Danescourt	Wolverhampton	England	20 July 1973	20 July 1973	1	
St Helen's Cricket Ground	Swansea	Wales	21 July 1973	21 July 1973	1	
The Saffrons	Eastbourne	England	21 July 1973	21 July 1973	1	
Edgbaston	Birmingham	England	28 July 1973	28 July 1973	1	
St Lawrence Ground	Canterbury	England	1 August 1976	21 September 2022	8	
Lord's	London	England	4 August 1976	19 July 2025	17	
Trent Bridge	Nottingham	England	8 August 1976	22 June 2000	3	
Keenan Stadium	Jamshedpur	India	1 January 1978	29 February 2004	3	
Eden Gardens	Kolkata	India	1 January 1978	9 December 2005	4	
Moin-ul-Haq Stadium	Patna	India	5 January 1978	22 December 1997	5	
Lal Bahadur Shastri Stadium	Hyderabad	India	8 January 1978	13 December 2003	7	
Lensbury Sports Ground	London	England	6 June 1979	6 June 1979	1	
Steetley Company Ground	Worksop	England	7 July 1979	7 July 1979	1	
Eden Park & Outer Oval †	Auckland	New Zealand	10 January 1982	20 March 2022	14	
Cornwall Park	Auckland	New Zealand	10 January 1982	14 January 1982	3	
Seddon Park	Hamilton	New Zealand	14 January 1982	7 April 2024	20	
Pukekura Park	New Plymouth	New Zealand	16 January 1982	18 January 1982	3	
McLean Park	Napier	New Zealand	17 January 1982	4 March 2025	6	
Fitzherbert Park	Palmerston North	New Zealand	20 January 1982	12 February 2000	6	
Cooks Gardens	Wanganui	New Zealand	20 January 1982	20 January 1982	1	
Basin Reserve	Wellington	New Zealand	24 January 1982	4 April 2026	29	
Hutt Recreation Ground	Lower Hutt	New Zealand	28 January 1982	11 February 1990	4	
University Oval & Logan Park (Note: The ODIs from the 1982 Women's Cricket World Cup are recorded as taking place at "Logan Park". However, as the University Oval is located in Logan Park, it's unclear if they took place on another field within the park or actually at the Oval. For that reason, the two records have been combined here.) †	Dunedin	New Zealand	30 January 1982	11 March 2026	10	
Trafalgar Park	Nelson	New Zealand	31 January 1982	31 January 1982	1	
Christ's College	Christchurch	New Zealand	2 February 1982	4 February 1982	2	
Ilam University	Christchurch	New Zealand	2 February 1982	6 February 1982	3	
Dudley Park	Rangiora	New Zealand	6 February 1982	22 January 1992	2	
Lancaster Park	Christchurch	New Zealand	6 February 1982	15 February 1999	7	
Country Golf Club Ground	Faridabad	India	19 January 1984	19 January 1984	1	
Sawai Mansingh Stadium	Jaipur	India	25 January 1984	21 December 2006	9	
Nehru Stadium	Pune	India	8 February 1984	24 January 2002	4	
M. A. Chidambaram Stadium	Chennai	India	23 February 1984	5 March 2007	11	
Central Recreation Ground (Note: The Central Recreation Ground was relocated to Horntye Park in 1996 when the Central Recreation Ground was demolished. As such, CricketArchive credits this match to the Central Recreation Ground and Cricinfo credits it to Horntye Park.)	Hastings	England	24 June 1984	24 June 1984	1	
Grace Road	Leicester	England	30 June 1984	1 September 2026	20	
County Ground	Bristol	England	21 July 1984	3 July 2024	17	
Sportpark Koninklijke HFC	Haarlem	Netherlands	8 August 1984	22 July 2003	10	
South Melbourne Cricket Ground	Melbourne	Australia	31 January 1985	31 January 1985	1	
Aberfeldie Park	Melbourne	Australia	2 February 1985	10 February 1985	5	
Arun Jaitley Stadium	Delhi	India	10 February 1985	20 September 2025	3	
Nehru Stadium	Indore	India	21 February 1985	17 December 1997	2	
Maulana Azad Stadium	Jammu	India	24 March 1985	24 March 1985	1	
Thornbury Avenue, Osterley	London	England	28 June 1986	28 June 1986	1	
Recreation Ground, Banstead	London	England	27 July 1986	20 July 1993	2	
Willetton Sports Club †	Perth	Australia	18 January 1987	30 November 1988	6	
Rosalie Park	Perth	Australia	21 January 1987	21 January 1987	1	
Ormeau Cricket Ground	Belfast	Northern Ireland	28 June 1987	28 June 1987	1	
College Park	Dublin	Ireland	1 July 1987	22 July 2004	11	
North Sydney Oval †	Sydney	Australia	3 December 1988	12 January 2025	22	
Manuka Oval	Canberra	Australia	7 December 1988	3 February 2022	9	
Carey Grammar School †	Melbourne	Australia	9 December 1988	16 December 1988	7	
Albert Cricket Ground	Melbourne	Australia	10 December 1988	25 February 2004	6	
Punt Road Oval	Melbourne	Australia	11 December 1988	17 December 1988	2	
Melbourne Cricket Ground	Melbourne	Australia	18 December 1988	23 January 2014	6	
Nykøbing Mors Cricket Club	Nykøbing Mors	Denmark	19 July 1989	21 July 1999	12	
Aylestone Road	Leicester	England	18 July 1990	20 July 1990	2	
John Player Ground	Nottingham	England	19 July 1990	20 July 1993	3	
Great Oakley Cricket Club Ground	Great Oakley	England	22 July 1990	22 July 1990	1	
Castle Avenue	Dublin	Ireland	16 August 1990	28 July 2023	12	
Observatory Lane	Dublin	Ireland	17 August 1990	17 July 2017	6	
Bellerive Oval	Hobart	Australia	17 January 1991	1 March 2026	8	
Melbourne Grammar School	Melbourne	Australia	19 January 1991	19 January 1991	1	
Hagley Oval †	Christchurch	New Zealand	23 January 1992	29 March 2026	24	
Oakes Oval	Lismore	Australia	13 January 1993	13 January 1993	1	
The Gabba	Brisbane	Australia	16 January 1993	17 January 1993	2	
Walton Lea Road	Warrington	England	20 July 1993	20 July 1993	1	
Denis Compton Oval	Shenley	England	20 July 1993	14 August 2008	5	
Collingham Cricket Club	Collingham	England	21 July 1993	21 July 1993	1	
Christ Church Ground	Oxford	England	21 July 1993	21 July 1993	1	
County Ground, Beckenham	London	England	21 July 1993	25 July 1993	2	
Meir Heath Cricket Club	Meir Heath	England	21 July 1993	21 July 1993	1	
Nevill Ground	Royal Tunbridge Wells	England	24 July 1993	24 July 1993	1	
Wellington College	Crowthorne	England	24 July 1993	31 July 2008	4	
Sonning Lane	Reading	England	24 July 1993	24 July 1993	1	
Wilton Park	Beaconsfield	England	24 July 1993	11 August 2002	2	
Bank of England Ground	London	England	25 July 1993	25 July 1993	1	
Finchampstead Park	Finchampstead	England	25 July 1993	25 July 1993	1	
Lindfield Common	Lindfield	England	25 July 1993	25 July 1993	1	
Woodbridge Road	Guildford	England	26 July 1993	26 July 1993	1	
Civil Service Sports Ground	London	England	26 July 1993	26 July 1993	1	
Honor Oak Cricket Club	London	England	28 July 1993	28 July 1993	1	
Arundel Castle Cricket Ground	Arundel	England	28 July 1993	7 September 2008	3	
Pound Lane	Marlow	England	28 July 1993	28 July 1993	1	
Midland Bank Sports Ground	London	England	29 July 1993	29 July 1993	1	
Chalvey Road	Slough	England	29 July 1993	29 July 1993	1	
Dorking Cricket Club	Dorking	England	29 July 1993	29 July 1993	1	
Levin Domain	Levin	New Zealand	20 January 1995	16 February 1995	2	
Victoria Park	Wanganui	New Zealand	14 February 1995	14 February 1995	1	
Railway Union Sports Club	Dublin	Ireland	18 July 1995	23 August 2012	5	
Sydney Parade (Note: Pembroke Cricket Club is located at Sydney Parade so although these are credited to two different grounds, they are not.)	Dublin	Ireland	19 July 1995	27 July 2000	4	
Nehru Stadium	Guwahati	India	14 November 1995	4 December 2005	2	
K. D. Singh Babu Stadium	Lucknow	India	5 December 1995	1 December 2005	4	
St Peter's College	Adelaide	Australia	1 February 1996	26 February 2006	3	
Adelaide Oval	Adelaide	Australia	3 February 1996	3 February 2024	7	
Riverside Ground	Chester-le-Street	England	18 June 1996	10 May 2026	6	
Carlisle Cricket Club	Dublin	Ireland	21 July 1996	21 July 1996	1	
Wesley College	Melbourne	Australia	7 February 1997	7 February 1997	1	
Mikkelberg-Kunst-und-Cricket Center	Hattstedt	Germany	5 July 1997	26 July 1998	4	
Stormont	Belfast	Northern Ireland	5 August 1997	28 July 2025	9	
County Ground	Taunton	England	17 August 1997	7 June 2025	24	
Leicester Road	Hinckley	England	27 August 1997	27 August 1997	1	
Bankstown Oval	Sydney	Australia	5 November 1997	21 March 2009	10	
Sinhalese Sports Club	Colombo	Sri Lanka	25 November 1997	4 May 2023	14	
Asgiriya Stadium	Kandy	Sri Lanka	29 November 1997	25 April 2004	4	
Gangothri Glades Cricket Ground	Mysore	India	10 December 1997	10 December 1997	1	
Mohan Meakins Cricket Stadium	Ghaziabad	India	11 December 1997	15 December 1997	2	
Karnail Singh Stadium	Delhi	India	11 December 1997	11 December 1997	1	
M. Chinnaswamy Stadium	Bangalore	India	12 December 1997	23 June 2024	15	
Indira Gandhi Stadium	Vijayawada	India	12 December 1997	12 December 1997	1	
Nahar Singh Stadium	Faridabad	India	13 December 1997	27 November 2005	2	
Sector 16 Stadium	Chandigarh	India	13 December 1997	15 December 1997	2	
Gymkhana Ground	Secunderabad	India	14 December 1997	14 December 1997	1	
Middle Income Group Ground	Mumbai	India	16 December 1997	13 February 2013	4	
Reliance Stadium	Vadodara	India	16 December 1997	14 October 2019	11	
Jamia Millia Islamia University Ground	Delhi	India	17 December 1997	17 December 1997	1	
VCA Ground	Nagpur	India	18 December 1997	18 December 1997	1	
Nehru Stadium	Gurgaon	India	18 December 1997	18 December 1997	1	
Harbax Singh Stadium	Delhi	India	20 December 1997	24 December 1997	2	
PCA Stadium	Mohali	India	21 December 1997	21 December 1997	1	
Wankhede Stadium	Mumbai	India	23 December 1997	2 January 2024	9	
Moors Sports Club	Colombo	Sri Lanka	13 April 1998	29 January 2002	5	
North Marine Road	Scarborough	England	12 July 1998	23 August 2014	3	
County Ground	Derby	England	15 July 1998	3 September 2026	19	
County Ground	Southampton	England	19 July 1998	19 July 1998	1	
Anglesea Road	Dublin	Ireland	27 July 1998	5 August 2016	5	
John Blanck Oval	Sunshine Coast	Australia	5 February 1999	5 February 1999	1	
Allan Border Field	Brisbane	Australia	7 February 1999	14 October 2026	24	
Carisbrook	Dunedin	New Zealand	13 February 1999	13 February 1999	1	
S. Thomas' College	Colombo	Sri Lanka	21 March 1999	21 March 1999	1	
Tyronne Fernando Stadium	Colombo	Sri Lanka	25 March 1999	30 January 2002	2	
R. Premadasa Stadium	Colombo	Sri Lanka	29 March 1999	24 October 2025	31	
Campbell Park Cricket Ground	Milton Keynes	England	26 June 1999	26 June 1999	1	
Old Trafford	Manchester	England	6 July 1999	17 August 2004	2	
County Ground	Northampton	England	9 July 1999	13 May 2026	6	
Sydney Cricket Ground	Sydney	Australia	29 January 2000	12 December 2012	7	
Bradman Oval	Bowral	Australia	1 February 2000	28 November 2014	5	
No. 1 Sports Ground	Newcastle	Australia	3 February 2000	10 March 2009	3	
Junction Oval	Melbourne	Australia	9 February 2000	14 January 2025	10	
Westpac Stadium	Wellington	New Zealand	15 February 2000	15 February 2000	1	
County Ground	Chelmsford	England	20 June 2000	29 May 2024	7	
New Road	Worcester	England	1 July 2000	6 September 2026	9	
Kenure	Rush	Ireland	23 July 2000	24 July 2002	3	
Centennial Park	Oamaru	New Zealand	19 November 2000	19 November 2000	1	
Aorangi Oval	Timaru	New Zealand	21 November 2000	22 November 2000	2	
Bert Sutcliffe Oval & Lincoln Green (Note: Bert Sutcliffe Oval, Lincoln Green and Lincoln No.3 are all parts of New Zealand Cricket's High Performance Centre at Lincoln University.) †	Lincoln	New Zealand	29 November 2000	8 March 2018	71	
National Stadium	Karachi	Pakistan	9 April 2001	9 May 2026	25	
Bradfield College	Reading	England	10 August 2001	12 August 2001	6	
Guru Nanak College	Chennai	India	6 January 2002	6 January 2002	1	
P. Saravanamuttu Stadium	Colombo	Sri Lanka	20 January 2002	29 April 2023	13	
Lenasia Stadium	Johannesburg	South Africa	7 March 2002	29 February 2004	2	
JB Marks Oval	Potchefstroom	South Africa	10 March 2002	11 December 2024	27	
Centurion Park	Centurion	South Africa	13 March 2002	25 February 2026	6	
Green Point Common	Cape Town	South Africa	16 March 2002	16 March 2002	1	
Sportpark Maarschalkerweerd	Utrecht	Netherlands	25 June 2002	6 August 2024	8	
VRA Ground	Amstelveen	Netherlands	26 June 2002	12 August 2024	13	
The Village	Malahide	Ireland	3 July 2002	9 August 2016	3	
Grainville	Saint Saviour	Jersey	10 July 2002	11 July 2002	2	
The Racecourse	Durham	England	16 July 2002	17 July 2002	2	
Arnos Vale Stadium	Kingstown	Saint Vincent and the Grenadines	13 March 2003	3 September 2011	8	
National Cricket Centre	Couva	Trinidad and Tobago	16 March 2003	16 March 2003	1	
Queen's Park Oval	Port of Spain	Trinidad and Tobago	18 March 2003	3 November 2013	4	
Sportpark Het Loopveld	Amstelveen	Netherlands	21 July 2003	21 July 2003	1	
Sportpark Hofbrouckerlaan	Oegstgeest	Netherlands	21 July 2003	21 July 2003	1	
Sportpark Drieburg	Amsterdam	Netherlands	21 July 2003	21 July 2003	1	
Donkere Laan	Bloemendaal	Netherlands	22 July 2003	22 July 2003	1	
Sportpark Laag Zestienhoven	Rotterdam	Netherlands	23 July 2003	23 July 2003	1	
Sportpark Harga	Schiedam	Netherlands	23 July 2003	23 July 2003	1	
Sportpark Thurlede	Schiedam	Netherlands	23 July 2003	23 July 2003	1	
Sportpark Nieuw Hanenburg	The Hague	Netherlands	25 July 2003	25 July 2003	1	
Sportpark Klein Zwitserland	The Hague	Netherlands	25 July 2003	25 July 2003	1	
Sportpark Duivesteijn	Voorburg	Netherlands	25 July 2003	25 July 2003	1	
Sophia Gardens	Cardiff	Wales	17 August 2003	16 May 2026	2	
Brabourne Stadium	Mumbai	India	4 December 2003	17 February 2013	11	
N2 Stadium	Aurangabad	India	7 December 2003	7 December 2003	1	
Chemplast Cricket Ground	Chennai	India	16 December 2003	5 March 2007	8	
ABSA Oval	Gqeberha	South Africa	15 February 2004	15 February 2004	1	
Buffalo Park	East London	South Africa	18 February 2004	13 December 2025	7	
Laudium Oval	Pretoria	South Africa	22 February 2004	20 January 2007	6	
Tata Digwadih Stadium	Dhanbad	India	26 February 2004	26 February 2004	1	
Tau Devi Lal Stadium	Gurgaon	India	12 March 2004	12 March 2004	1	
Asghar Ali Shah Stadium	Karachi	Pakistan	23 March 2004	2 April 2004	3	
Karachi Gymkhana	Karachi	Pakistan	25 March 2004	1 January 2006	5	
Infosys Ground	Mysore	India	11 December 2004	13 December 2004	2	
Police Gymkhana Ground	Mumbai	India	16 December 2004	16 December 2004	1	
Bilakhiya Stadium	Vapi	India	19 December 2004	19 December 2004	1	
Pithwala Stadium	Surat	India	22 December 2004	22 December 2004	1	
Mayajaal Sports Village	Chennai	India	28 December 2004	28 December 2004	1	
Lilac Hill	Perth	Australia	10 March 2005	10 March 2005	1	
WACA Ground	Perth	Australia	12 March 2005	11 December 2024	7	
Manzil Park	Klerksdorp	South Africa	13 March 2005	13 March 2005	1	
Technikon Oval	Pretoria	South Africa	22 March 2005	9 April 2005	7	
Harlequins	Pretoria	South Africa	22 March 2005	22 January 2007	8	
LC de Villiers Oval	Pretoria	South Africa	24 March 2005	1 April 2005	4	
Olympia Park	Rustenburg	South Africa	26 March 2005	26 March 2005	1	
Eersterust Cricket Club	Pretoria	South Africa	26 March 2005	1 April 2005	2	
Willowmoore Park	Benoni	South Africa	28 March 2005	23 December 2023	5	
YMCA Cricket Club	Dublin	Ireland	31 July 2005	8 June 2018	7	
Cheltenham College	Cheltenham	England	15 August 2005	15 August 2005	1	
Chester Road North	Kidderminster	England	19 August 2005	19 August 2005	1	
Glyn Park	Miskin Manor	Wales	19 August 2005	19 August 2005	1	
Swans Nest Lane	Stratford-upon-Avon	England	21 August 2005	3 July 2009	2	
Colts Cricket Club	Colombo	Sri Lanka	10 November 2005	26 April 2011	2	
Satindra Mohan Dev Stadium	Silchar	India	7 December 2005	7 December 2005	1	
Woodville Oval	Adelaide	Australia	28 February 2006	28 February 2006	1	
The Vineyard	Dublin	Ireland	30 July 2006	10 June 2018	4	
Rose Bowl	Southampton	England	24 August 2006	16 July 2025	4	
Sinovich Park	Pretoria	South Africa	24 January 2007	28 January 2007	3	
Gardens Oval	Darwin	Australia	21 July 2007	28 July 2007	5	
Sportpark Het Schootsveld	Deventer	Netherlands	5 August 2007	9 July 2008	4	
Stanley Park	Blackpool	England	26 August 2007	27 August 2007	2	
Stellenbosch University Ground †	Stellenbosch	South Africa	18 February 2008	24 February 2008	6	
Rangiri Dambulla International Stadium	Dambulla	Sri Lanka	2 May 2008	24 March 2018	14	
Welagedara Stadium	Kurunegala	Sri Lanka	5 May 2008	11 May 2008	4	
Haslegrave Ground	Loughborough	England	11 July 2008	3 July 2013	4	
North Parade	Bath	England	30 August 2008	30 August 2008	1	
Hurstville Oval	Sydney	Australia	31 October 2008	13 November 2014	3	
Cobham Oval	Whangārei	New Zealand	1 February 2009	3 February 2009	2	
Shaheed Chandu Stadium	Bogra	Bangladesh	7 February 2009	7 February 2009	1	
Sheikh Abu Naser Stadium	Khulna	Bangladesh	12 February 2009	12 February 2009	1	
Sher-e-Bangla National Stadium	Dhaka	Bangladesh	17 February 2009	2 December 2024	19	
Drummoyne Oval	Sydney	Australia	12 March 2009	21 March 2009	5	
Sir Paul Getty's Ground	Chiltern Hills	England	5 July 2009	11 July 2012	3	
Boland Park	Paarl	South Africa	16 October 2009	24 October 2016	6	
Newlands	Cape Town	South Africa	18 October 2009	23 October 2009	2	
Warner Park	Basseterre	Saint Kitts and Nevis	4 November 2009	2 April 2026	18	
ACA-VDCA Stadium	Visakhapatnam	India	24 February 2010	26 October 2025	10	
Bandra Kurla Complex	Mumbai	India	1 March 2010	8 February 2013	4	
John Davies Oval	Queenstown	New Zealand	3 March 2010	12 December 2023	7	
Queen's Park	Invercargill	New Zealand	6 March 2010	7 March 2010	2	
St Paul's Sporting Complex	St Paul's	Saint Kitts and Nevis	18 April 2010	20 April 2010	2	
Kibworth Cricket Club	Kibworth	England	4 July 2010	7 July 2010	2	
Shaw Lane	Barnsley	England	17 July 2010	17 July 2010	1	
New Williamfield	Stirling	Scotland	11 August 2010	31 August 2026	2	
Absa Puk Oval †	Potchefstroom	South Africa	6 October 2010	19 May 2017	13	
Witrand Cricket Field	Potchefstroom	South Africa	6 October 2010	12 October 2010	5	
Nondescripts Cricket Club	Colombo	Sri Lanka	15 November 2010	19 February 2017	8	
Madhavrao Scindia Cricket Ground	Rajkot	India	18 January 2011	19 January 2011	2	
Thurstan College	Colombo	Sri Lanka	29 April 2011	29 April 2011	1	
John Walker's Ground	London	England	5 July 2011	5 July 2011	1	
Butt's Way	Aston Rowant	England	7 July 2011	7 July 2011	1	
Bangladesh Krira Shikkha Protisthan cricket grounds †	Dhaka	Bangladesh	14 November 2011	26 November 2011	5	
Fatullah Osmani Stadium	Fatullah	Bangladesh	14 November 2011	26 November 2011	5	
Blacktown International Sportspark	Sydney	Australia	29 January 2012	29 January 2012	1	
Narendra Modi Stadium	Ahmedabad	India	12 March 2012	29 October 2024	7	
Kensington Oval	Bridgetown	Barbados	25 April 2012	22 September 2018	4	
Windward Park	Lucas Street	Barbados	27 April 2012	29 April 2012	2	
Boscawen Park	Truro	England	8 July 2012	8 July 2012	1	
Phoenix Cricket Club	Dublin	Ireland	21 August 2012	21 August 2012	1	
Windsor Park	Roseau	Dominica	12 January 2013	15 January 2013	3	
Barabati Stadium	Cuttack	India	1 February 2013	15 February 2013	8	
DRIEMS Ground	Cuttack	India	1 February 2013	5 February 2013	3	
Louth Cricket Club	Louth	England	1 July 2013	1 July 2013	1	
Scorers	Solihull	England	10 July 2013	10 July 2013	1	
Wanderers	Johannesburg	South Africa	22 September 2013	19 December 2025	7	
Sabina Park	Kingston	Jamaica	6 October 2013	19 October 2016	6	
West End Park Stadium	Doha	Qatar	10 January 2014	17 January 2014	6	
Sheikh Kamal International Stadium	Cox's Bazar	Bangladesh	4 March 2014	8 October 2018	8	
Peter Burge Oval	Brisbane	Australia	21 August 2014	28 August 2014	4	
Sharjah Cricket Stadium	Sharjah	United Arab Emirates	9 January 2015	5 November 2017	9	
Bay Oval	Mount Maunganui	New Zealand	11 February 2015	18 March 2022	19	
Southend Club Cricket Stadium	Karachi	Pakistan	4 October 2015	5 June 2022	5	
Daren Sammy Cricket Ground	Gros Islet	Saint Lucia	16 October 2015	1 July 2023	7	
JSCA International Stadium Complex	Ranchi	India	15 February 2016	19 February 2016	3	
Shaw's Bridge Lower Ground	Belfast	Northern Ireland	9 September 2016	10 September 2016	2	
Diamond Oval	Kimberley	South Africa	8 October 2016	4 December 2024	9	
Trelawny Stadium	Trelawny	Jamaica	8 October 2016	10 October 2016	2	
ACA–KDCA Cricket Ground	Mulapadu	India	10 November 2016	16 November 2016	3	
Saxton Oval	Nelson	New Zealand	17 November 2016	9 March 2025	4	
Coffs Harbour International Stadium	Coffs Harbour	Australia	27 November 2016	29 October 2017	4	
Colombo Cricket Club	Colombo	Sri Lanka	15 February 2017	19 February 2017	3	
Brian Lara Stadium	Tarouba	Trinidad and Tobago	11 October 2017	15 October 2017	3	
Vidarbha Cricket Association Stadium	Nagpur	India	6 April 2018	12 April 2018	3	
Mangaung Oval	Bloemfontein	South Africa	14 May 2018	22 February 2026	2	
Headingley	Leeds	England	7 July 2018	7 July 2018	1	
Galle International Stadium	Galle	Sri Lanka	11 September 2018	3 July 2023	5	
Chilaw Marians Cricket Club Ground	Katunayake	Sri Lanka	16 September 2018	21 March 2019	2	
Kinrara Academy Oval	Kuala Lumpur	Malaysia	18 October 2018	14 December 2019	6	
Dubai International Cricket Stadium	Dubai	United Arab Emirates	7 February 2019	7 February 2019	1	
ICC Academy	Dubai	United Arab Emirates	9 February 2019	14 April 2024	5	
Karen Rolton Oval	Adelaide	Australia	24 February 2019	24 February 2019	1	
Mahinda Rajapaksa International Cricket Stadium	Hambantota	Sri Lanka	16 March 2019	28 July 2026	8	
Coolidge Cricket Ground	Antigua	Antigua and Barbuda	5 September 2019	13 September 2021	7	
Sir Vivian Richards Stadium	Antigua	Antigua and Barbuda	8 September 2019	9 December 2022	15	
Gaddafi Stadium	Lahore	Pakistan	2 November 2019	22 September 2025	16	
Kingsmead	Durban	South Africa	20 January 2021	1 March 2026	6	
Ekana Cricket Stadium	Lucknow	India	7 March 2021	17 March 2021	5	
Great Barrier Reef Arena	Mackay	Australia	21 September 2021	26 September 2021	3	
Harare Sports Club	Harare	Zimbabwe	5 October 2021	30 September 2026	18	
Queens Sports Club	Bulawayo	Zimbabwe	10 November 2021	2 October 2025	17	
Old Hararians	Harare	Zimbabwe	21 November 2021	23 November 2021	2	
Sunrise Sports Club	Harare	Zimbabwe	27 November 2021	27 November 2021	1	
Pallekele International Cricket Stadium	Pallekele	Sri Lanka	1 July 2022	7 July 2022	3	
Sportpark Westvliet	The Hague	Netherlands	26 August 2022	26 August 2022	1	
Royal Chiangmai Golf Club	Chiang Mai	Thailand	20 November 2022	26 November 2022	4	
Terdthai Cricket Ground	Bangkok	Thailand	19 April 2023	23 April 2023	3	
City Oval	Pietermaritzburg	South Africa	28 September 2023	28 September 2023	1	
Desert Springs Cricket Ground	Almería	Spain	17 October 2023	21 October 2023	3	
Baroda Cricket Association Stadium	Vadodara	India	21 December 2024	28 October 2026	6	
Niranjan Shah Stadium	Rajkot	India	10 January 2025	15 January 2025	3	
Lahore City Cricket Association Ground	Lahore	Pakistan	9 April 2025	19 April 2025	7	
Grand Prairie Stadium	Dallas	United States	1 May 2025	3 May 2025	2	
Three Ws Oval	Bridgetown	Barbados	11 June 2025	17 June 2025	3	
Maharaja Yadavindra Singh International Cricket Stadium	Mullanpur	India	14 September 2025	17 September 2025	2	
Barsapara Cricket Stadium	Guwahati	India	30 September 2025	29 October 2025	5	
Holkar Stadium	Holkar	India	1 October 2025	25 October 2025	5	
Amini Park	Port Moresby	Papua New Guinea	13 October 2025	17 August 2026	7	
DY Patil Stadium	Navi Mumbai	India	20 October 2025	2 November 2025	5	
St George's Park	Gqeberha	South Africa	16 December 2025	16 December 2025	1	
National Cricket Stadium	St. George's	Grenada	20 February 2026	25 February 2026	3	
Shaheed Qamaruzzaman Stadium	Rajshahi	Bangladesh	20 April 2026	25 April 2026	3	
Bready Cricket Club Ground	Bready	Northern Ireland	10 July 2026	15 July 2026	3	
Titwood	Glasgow	Scotland	28 August 2026	28 August 2026	1	

== Grounds by country ==
Last updated: 28 October 2026 (WODI 1573) (Note: Cricinfo groups together the individual countries of the West Indies together, but these have been separated for this list. ESPNcricinfo also counts Welsh and Jersey grounds under England and grounds from the Republic of Ireland and Northern Ireland together under Ireland; these have also been separated for this list. ESPNcricinfo counts pre-1995 Ireland grounds under England and these have also been separated and added to the ROI or NI for this list.)

Country	No. of Grounds	First ground used	City	Date of first match	No. of ODIs
Antigua and Barbuda	2	Coolidge Cricket Ground	Osbourn	5 September 2019	22
Australia	35	South Melbourne Cricket Ground	Melbourne	31 January 1984	183
Bangladesh	7	Shaheed Chandu Stadium	Bogra	7 February 2009	42
Barbados	3	Kensington Oval	Bridgetown	25 April 2012	9
Denmark	1	Nykøbing Mors Cricket Club	Nykøbing Mors	19 July 1989	12
Dominica	1	Windsor Park	Roseau	12 January 2013	3
England	82	County Ground	Hove	23 June 1973	255
Germany	1	Mikkelberg-Kunst-und-Cricket Center	Hattstedt	5 July 1997	4
Grenada	1	National Cricket Stadium	St. George's	20 February 2026	3
India	57	Keenan Stadium	Jamshedpur	1 January 1978	214
Ireland	12	College Park	Dublin	1 July 1987	57
Jamaica	2	Sabina Park	Kingston	6 October 2013	8
Jersey	1	Grainville	Saint Saviour	10 July 2002	2
Malaysia	1	Kinrara Academy Oval	Kuala Lumpur	18 October 2018	6
Netherlands	15	Sportpark Koninklijke HFC	Haarlem	8 August 1984	46
New Zealand	20	Eden Park	Auckland	10 January 1982	248
Northern Ireland	4	Ormeau Cricket Ground	Belfast	28 July 1987	15
Pakistan	6	National Stadium	Karachi	9 April 2001	61
Papua New Guinea	1	Amini Park	Port Moresby	13 October 2025	7
Qatar	1	West End Park Stadium	Doha	10 January 2014	6
Saint Kitts and Nevis	2	Warner Park	Basseterre	4 November 2009	20
Saint Lucia	1	Darren Sammy National Cricket Stadium	Gros Islet	16 October 2015	7
Saint Vincent	1	Arnos Vale Stadium	Kingstown	13 March 2003	8
Scotland	2	New Williamfield	Stirling	11 August 2010	3
South Africa	26	Lenasia Stadium	Johannesburg	7 March 2002	139
Spain	1	Desert Springs Cricket Ground	Almería	17 October 2023	3
Sri Lanka	17	Sinhalese Sports Club	Colombo	25 November 1997	120
Thailand	2	Royal Chiangmai Golf Club	Chiang Mai	20 November 2022	7
Trinidad and Tobago	3	National Cricket Centre	Couva	16 March 2003	8
United Arab Emirates	3	Sharjah Cricket Stadium	Sharjah	9 January 2015	15
United States	1	Grand Prairie Stadium	Dallas	1 May 2025	2
Wales	3	St Helen's Cricket Ground	Swansea	21 July 1973	4
Zimbabwe	4	Harare Sports Club	Harare	5 October 2021	28

== See also ==
- List of Test cricket grounds
- List of women's Test cricket grounds
- List of One Day International cricket grounds
- List of Twenty20 International cricket grounds
- List of women's Twenty20 International cricket grounds
