= Cricket in the Netherlands =

- Country: Netherlands
- Governing body: Royal Dutch Cricket Association
- National team: Netherlands
- Nickname: Dutch
- First played: 1881
- Registered players: 6,400 (approx)

National competitions
- Topklasse; Hoofdklasse; Dutch Twenty20 Cup

Club competitions
- Euro T20 Slam

International competitions
- Cricket World Cup; ICC World Twenty20; ICC Champions Trophy

Cricket has been played in the Netherlands since at least the 19th century, and in the 1860s was considered a major sport in the country. The sport is governed by the Royal Dutch Cricket Association.

Other sports (notably football) have long since surpassed cricket in popularity amongst the Dutch but today there are around 6,500 cricketers in the Netherlands and recent developments show that cricket is growing in Netherlands. The first national association, the forerunner of today's KNCB, was formed in 1883, and the Netherlands achieved associate membership of the ICC in 1966.

The Dutch national side has qualified for the World Cup on five occasions (1996, 2003, 2007, 2011 and 2023) and the ICC World Twenty20 on five occasions (2009, 2014, 2016, 2019 and 2022). The team previously had One Day International (ODI) status, but lost that status at the 2014 World Cup Qualifier, at which it failed to qualify for the 2015 World Cup. They regained the One Day International (ODI) status after clinching the ICC World Cricket League Championship title in 2017.

The popularity of cricket in the Netherlands has also influenced the sport's development in both former Dutch colonies and current members of the Kingdom of the Netherlands. Cricket in Indonesia was introduced by the Dutch, Sint Maarten is a member of the West Indies Cricket Board, and Suriname is an associate member of the ICC.

== History ==
The popularity of cricket in the Netherlands has also influenced the sport's development in former Dutch colonies, including current members of the Kingdom of the Netherlands. Suriname is an associate member of the ICC, and Sint Maarten is a member of the West Indies Cricket Board, which has full membership.

In 2005 the Dutch team beat the UAE to finish fifth in the ICC Trophy, a slightly disappointing result but one which qualified them for the 2007 World Cup; they enjoyed full One Day International status from 1 January 2006 until the 2009 ICC Trophy.

2001 finally saw the Netherlands win the ICC Trophy, beating Namibia in the final in Toronto. They thus qualified for the 2003 World Cup. They again failed to progress beyond the first round in the tournament, but recorded their first one-day international win over Namibia during the tournament. Feiko Kloppenburg (with 121) and Klaas-Jan van Noortwijk (134 not out) scored the first two One Day International centuries in the side's history.

In the 2005 ICC Trophy, the Netherlands finished 5th, qualifying for the 2007 Cricket World Cup, and gaining one-day International status until the 2009 ICC World Cup Qualifier. Their first one-day international with this new status was scheduled to be against Kenya in March 2006; however this match was cancelled due to a Kenyan tour of Bangladesh. Instead their first ODI with this status (and their twelfth overall) came against Sri Lanka; this was their first ODI at home. Sri Lanka won the two-match series 2–0, scoring a record ODI score of 443–9 in one of the two matches.

The Dutch played their first Intercontinental Cup match of 2006 against Kenya in Nairobi in March. The game was drawn, but the Netherlands gained six points for a first innings lead. In August, the Netherlands competed in Division One of the European Championship. They beat Denmark and Italy, but lost to Scotland and their game against Ireland was rained off. They finished third in the tournament.

In November, the Dutch travelled to South Africa. They first played an Intercontinental Cup match against Bermuda: David Hemp achieved what was then a competition record score of 247 not out in the drawn match. This was followed by a triangular series against Bermuda and Canada, which they won. Their final game of 2006, also in South Africa, was an Intercontinental Cup game against Canada. They won the match by 7 wickets, with Ryan ten Doeschate setting a new competition record individual score of 259 not out.

In early 2007, they travelled to Nairobi, Kenya to take part in Division One of the World Cricket League, finishing third out of six. This was followed by the 2007 World Cup in the West Indies, where they were eliminated in the first round, though they did beat Scotland along the way.

Following the World Cup, they underwent a period of transformation. Captain Luuk van Troost retired, as did Tim de Leede and their coach Peter Cantrell. Daan van Bunge also opted to take a break from international cricket, and the new coach opted not to retain the services of bowling coach Ian Pont.

In June 2007, they visited Canada, first winning an Intercontinental Cup match against Canada in King City, Ontario. They then won the first ODI by 117 runs, with the second one being abandoned. They then played a quadrangular series in Ireland, losing by ten wickets to the West Indies, and by one run to Ireland, with the game against Scotland being abandoned due to rain.

In August 2008, The Netherlands participated in the 2009 ICC World Twenty20 Qualifier. This was their debut playing Twenty20 International matches. They finished in first place in Group B, based on their run-rate. After beating Scotland in the Semi-Finals, the final was abandoned due to rain and the trophy was shared between The Netherlands and Ireland.

The Netherlands caused a sensation in the cricketing world by beating England in the opening match of the ICC World Twenty20 2009, whilst being 500/1 outsiders. They lost their second match to the eventual winners Pakistan and did not qualify for the super 8 stage based on run rate.

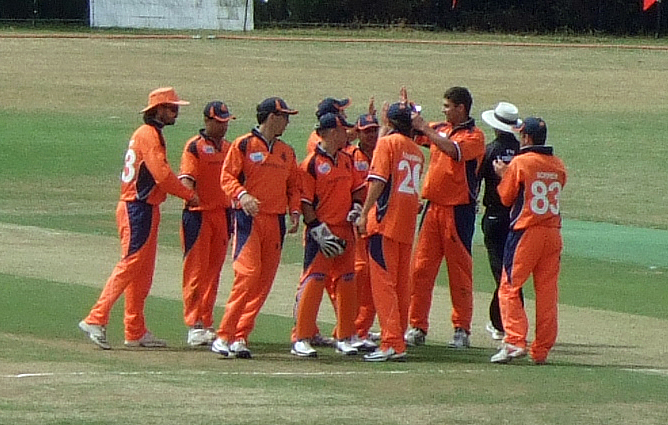
Netherlands national cricket team at Rotterdam, ICC WCL Division One in 2010

In July 2010, The Netherlands beat a full-member nation for the first time in an ODI. In a one-off match shortened by rain to 30 overs a side, they beat Bangladesh by 6 wickets. The win in combination with their winning percentage against other associate and affiliate nations resulted in The Netherlands being included in ICC's official ODI-rankings.

In February 2011, The Netherlands posted their highest ever total against a full-member nation, scoring 292 against England, batting first at the 2011 Cricket World Cup. Ryan Ten Doeschate top scored with 119 from 110 balls. However, the Netherlands were unable to defend their strong total and failed to pull off a huge shock, England winning by 6 wickets with 2 overs to spare. They eventually failed to win any of their group matches and were last in their Group.

In September 2011, Netherlands whitewashed Kenya in a short two-match ODI series held at home.

In January 2014, World Cup Qualifier saw Netherlands failed to qualify for the World Cup and lose their ODI status till 2018 although the Netherlands did qualify for 2014 ICC World Twenty20 instead of Scotland. It gained their ODI status back after winning the 2015–17 ICC World Cricket League Championship.

In the 2014 ICC World Twenty20, Netherlands had one win and one loss before their final game. In order to go through on net run rate against Zimbabwe and Ireland, they needed to chase down Ireland's score in 14.2 overs or less. As Ireland scored 189, this seemed unlikely.

However, strong and aggressive batting enabled them to score 193/4 in 13.5 overs, securing passage to the 2014 ICC World Twenty20 Super 10s. Although they lost their first three games in the group, including a 39 all out against Sri Lanka, they pulled off an upset against England in their last game.

== Governing body ==
The Koninklijke Nederlandse Cricket Bond (Royal Dutch Cricket Board) is the governing body of cricket in the Netherlands. It was formed in 1883 and received a Royal charter in 1958. The Netherlands achieved Associate Membership of the ICC in 1966.

The KNCB has been an associate member of the International Cricket Council since 1966. There are a few cricket grounds in the Netherlands which are officially sanctioned by the ICC to host ODIs such as Amsterdam, Amstelveen and Voorburg. It hosted some of the matches of the 1999 Cricket World Cup, though the Dutch did not participate in that tournament.

The Dutch participated in the 1996 Cricket World Cup, 2003 Cricket World Cup, 2007 Cricket World Cup, and 2011 Cricket World Cup. In their debut campaign, they lost all of their matches badly barring a respectable performance against England. They qualified for the 2003 edition after winning the 2001 ICC Trophy, with their only win of the World Cup tournament coming against fellow qualifier Namibia. It was around this time that stars and excellent cricketers like Roland Lefebvre and Ryan ten Doeschate started emerging to make Dutch cricket much more strong.

Before 1958 it was known as the Nederlandse Cricket Bond or the Dutch Cricket Board. After receiving a Royal charter in 1958, a "Royal" was added before the board's name known simply as Koninklijke in Dutch. The following names have been for the board in their history:-

- Nederlandse Cricket Bond (Dutch Cricket Board)
- Koninklijke Nederlandse Cricket Bond (Royal Dutch Cricket Board)

== Domestic competitions ==
The main cricket division is called Topklasse, in which eight teams compete for the national championships.
Other important competitions are: Hoofdklasse, Eerste Klasse, and the Twenty20 Cup.

- Topklasse,

Topklasse known before as Hoofdklasse is the highest domestic cricket competition in the Netherlands.
Eight teams are playing in the regular competition; the finalists being decided during a play-off stage.

=== Previous champions ===
1997 – Excelsior '20
1998 – VRA
1999 – VRA
2000 – Excelsior '20
2001 – VRA
2002 – VCC
2003 – VRA
2004 – Excelsior '20
2005 – VRA
2006 – VRA
2007 – VRA
2008 – HCC
2009 – Excelsior '20
2010 – VRA
2011 – VRA
2012 – Excelsior '20
2013 – Quick Haag

=== Teams ===
A total of 8 teams are taking part in the league

| Club | Location | Venue |
|---|---|---|
| ACC | Amstelveen | Sportpark 't Loopveld |
| Dosti CC | Amsterdam | Sportpark Drieburg |
| HBS | The Hague | Sportpark Craeyenhout |
| HCC | The Hague | Sportpark De Diepput |
| Hermes D.V.S. | Schiedam | Sportpark Harga |
| H.V. & C.V. QUICK | The Hague | Sportpark Nieuw Hanenburg |
| Excelsior'20 | Schiedam | Sportpark Thurlede |
| VRA | Amstelveen | Sportpark Amsterdamse Bos |

=== Twenty20 cricket ===
The first season of the European T20 league, a Twenty20 franchise-based tournament, is scheduled to start in August 2019.

== Grounds ==
There are numerous club grounds throughout Netherlands. Over 14 grounds have been used for First-class, List A and Twenty20 cricket matches. Additionally, some of the List-A matches have come in the form of One Day Internationals. Some grounds have hosted Women's One Day Internationals and Women's Twenty20 Internationals.

| Official name (known as) | City or town | Capacity | Notes | Ref |
|---|---|---|---|---|
| Hazelaarweg Stadion | Rotterdam | 10,000 | Has held ten One Day Internationals, a Women's Test match between Netherlands Women and South Africa Women in 2007, two first-class matches and fourteen List A matches | |
| Sportpark Duivesteijn† | Voorburg | Unknown | Held a Women's One Day International in 2003 between Pakistan Women and West Indies Women. Now defunct and last used for cricket in 2005 | |
| Sportpark Harga | Schiedam | Unknown | Has held a single Women's One Day International between Netherlands Women and Japan Women in 2003 | |
| Sportpark Het Loopveld | Amstelveen | Unknown | Has held a single Women's One Day International between Ireland Women and West Indies Women in 2003 | |
| Sportpark Hofbrouckerlaan | Oegstgeest | Unknown | Has held a single Women's One Day International between Netherlands Women and Scotland Women in 2003 | |
| Sportpark Het Schootsveld | Deventer | Unknown | Has held four Women's One Day Internationals, three first-class matches and three List A matches | |
| Sportpark Klein Zwitserland | The Hague | Unknown | Has held a single Women's One Day International between Japan Women and Scotland Women in 2003 | |
| Sportpark Koninklijke HFC | Haarlem | Unknown | Has held ten Women's One Day Internationals | |
| Sportpark Laag Zestienhoven | Rotterdam | Unknown | Has held a single Women's One Day International between Ireland Women and Pakistan Women in 2003 | |
| Sportpark Maarschalkerweerd | Utrecht | Unknown | Has held six Women's One Day Internationals, five Women's Twenty20 Internationals and a single first-class match | |
| Sportpark Nieuw Hanenburg | The Hague | Unknown | Has held a single Women's One Day International between Netherlands Women and Ireland Women in 2003 | |
| Sportpark Thurlede | Schiedam | Unknown | Has held two One Day Internationals, Women's One Day International and four List A matches | |
| Sportpark Westvliet | Voorburg | Unknown | Has held four One Day Internationals, which includes the four List A matches held there | |
| VRA Cricket Ground | Amstelveen | 4,000 | Has held sixteen One Day Internationals, five Women's One Day Internationals, four first-class matches and 25 List A matches | |

== National team ==
The Netherlands national cricket team qualified for the Cricket World Cup on 5 occasions; 1996, 2003, 2007, 2011, 2023 Also qualified for 2009 ICC World Twenty20. The country has been considered one of the stronger "minnow" nations for some time. Netherlands beat England in the 2009 ICC World Twenty20 which is one of the biggest wins in Dutch cricket history. One year later they recorded their first ODI win against a full ICC member when they beat Bangladesh. Although the sport is sustained by a small player base, some have won professional contracts in England. Netherlands is ranked within the top 15 teams in the world and has co-hosted the ICC Cricket World Cup in 1999.

In February 2011, The Netherlands posted their highest ever total against a full-member nation, scoring 292 against England, batting first at the 2011 Cricket World Cup. Ryan Ten Doeschate top scored 119 from 110 balls. However, the Netherlands were unable to defend their strong total and failed to pull off a huge shock, England winning by 6 wickets with 2 overs to spare. They eventually failed to win any of their group matches and were last in their Group.

In September 2011, Netherlands whitewashed Kenya in a short two-match ODI series held at home.

In January 2014, World Cup Qualifier saw Netherlands failed to qualify for the World Cup and lose their ODI status till 2018 although the Netherlands did qualify for 2014 ICC World Twenty20 instead of Scotland.

== National women's team ==
The Dutch women's cricket team represents the Netherlands in international women's cricket matches. Unlike their male counterparts, they currently have both Test and ODI status.

== Under-19 cricket team ==
Netherlands Under-19 cricket team represents the Netherlands in Under-19 international cricket.

The team has been playing in international youth tournaments since 1979 but have only participated in one U-19 World Cup in 2000. They most recently participated in 2010 European U-19 Championship where they finished fourth, thus missing out on a chance for World Cup qualification.

== Famous players ==
Several Dutch cricketers have also played at first-class level elsewhere, the most successful of these probably being

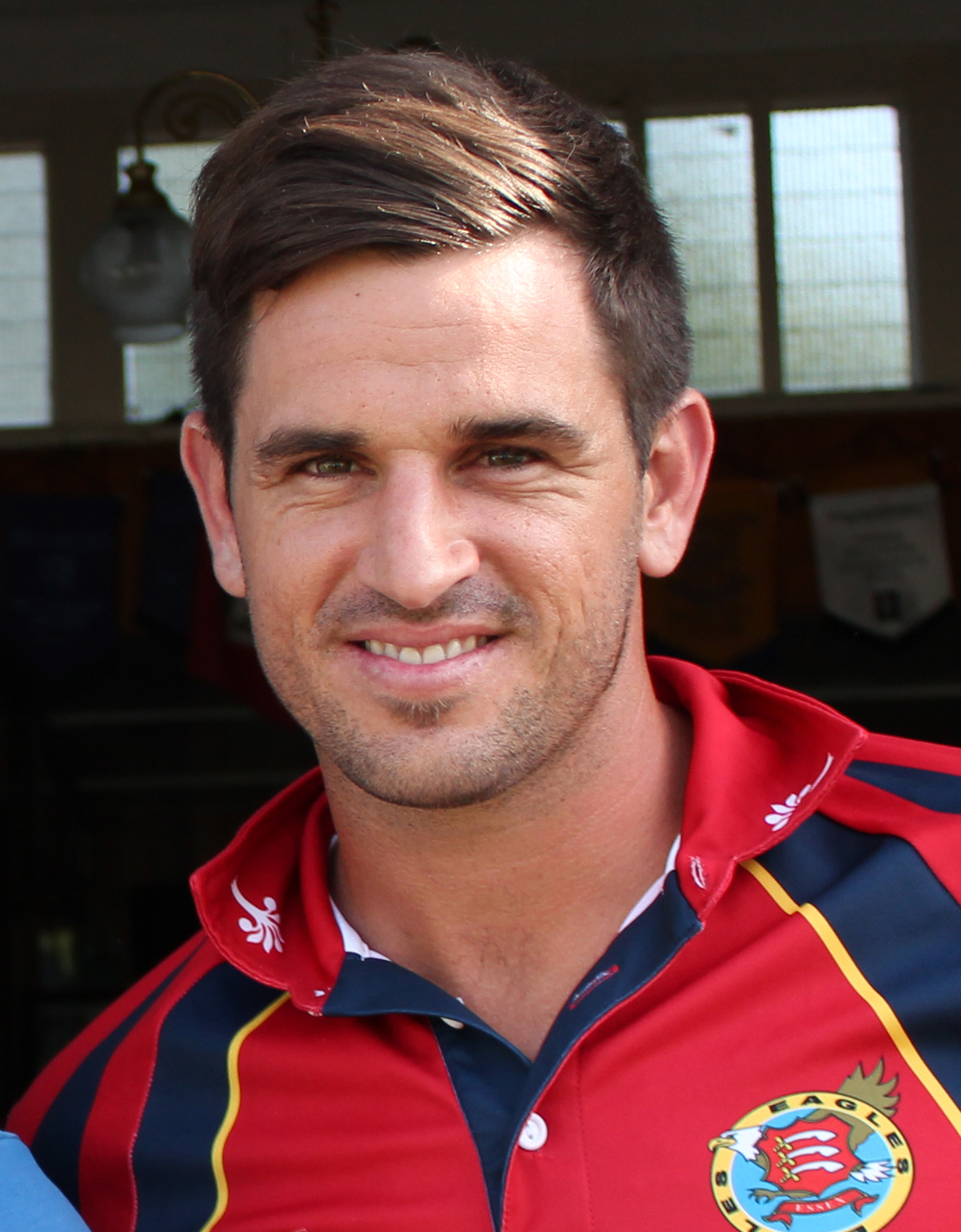
Ten Doeschate

- Alexei Kervezee is the only current member of the Dutch team to be playing county cricket for Worcestershire
- Andre van Troost – who played for Somerset from 1991 to 1998, and for Griqualand West in the 1994/95 season in South Africa.
- Bas Zuiderent – who played for Sussex from 2001 to 2003.
- Carst Posthuma – who played five first class games for London County Cricket Club in 1903.
- Bill Glerum – who played one first class game for the Free Foresters in 1957.
- Dirk Nannes – who played for Victoria in Australia, for Delhi Daredevils in India and also for the Australian National Cricket Team.
- Daan van Bunge – who played for Middlesex in 2004 and was the unfortunate victim as Herschelle Gibbs set a new ODI record by scoring 36 runs (six sixes from six balls) from Van Bunge's fourth over in 2007 World Cup
- Feiko Kloppenburg – made 121 to become the first Dutch cricketer to score an ODI century, just ahead of teammate Klaas-Jan van Noortwijk who also passed three figures in the match and with whom he put on 228 for the second wicket, a Dutch record for any wicket any only the sixth player to score a hundred and take four wickets in the same ODI.
- Klaas-Jan van Noortwijk – once van Noortwijk holds the record for the highest individual score for the Netherlands in a One Day International, having scored an unbeaten 134 against Namibia at the 2003 World Cup. But he will also be remembered for his 64 runs against England during the 2003 World Cup.
- Logan van Beek – he also represented New Zealand at the World Under-19 Basketball Championships in 2009 and was the New Zealand squad for the Under-19 World Cup in 2010, van Beek is the grandson of Sammy Guillen, who played Test cricket for both West Indies and New Zealand.
- Michael Swart – formerly played for Western Australia in Australian domestic matches.
- Nolan Clarke – who played for Barbados from 1969/70 until 1976/77.
- Paul-Jan Bakker – who played for Hampshire from 1986 until 1992.
- Peter Borren – represented his native New Zealand in Under 19 World Cup in 2002 and former captain of the Netherlands cricket team
- Roland Lefebvre who played for Somerset and Glamorgan in English county cricket as well as for Canterbury in New Zealand
- Stephan Myburgh – holds record of second fastest fifty in Twenty20 International with Paul Stirling of Ireland
- Ryan ten Doeschate – Playing for Essex, Otago Volts and Kolkata Knight Riders
- Timm van der Gugten – Playing for New South Wales.
- Tom Cooper – who currently plays first class cricket for South Australia
- Wesley Barresi – is a former South African first class player who Represented Easterns Cricket at Under-15s, Under-19s, Under-23s level before making his first class debut in 2003 against Titans.

== See also ==
- Sport in the Netherlands
