= List of cricket grounds in the Netherlands =

This is a list of cricket grounds in the Netherlands. The grounds included in this list have held first-class and List-A matches. Additionally, some of the List-A matches have come in the form of One Day Internationals. Some grounds have hosted Women's One Day Internationals and Women's Twenty20 Internationals.

== List of grounds ==
Official name (known as)	City or town	Capacity	Notes	Ref.
Donkerelaan	Bloemendaal	Unknown	Has held a single Women's One Day International between the Scotland Women and Pakistan Women on 22 July at the 2003 IWCC Trophy.	
Hazelaarweg Stadion	Rotterdam	3,500	Has held ten One Day Internationals, a Women's Test match between Netherlands Women and Pakistan Women in 2007, two first-class matches and fourteen List A matches	
Sportpark Duivesteijn^{†}	Voorburg	Unknown	Held a Women's One Day International in 2003 between Pakistan Women and West Indies Women. Now defunct. Last used for cricket in 2005 by Voorburg Cricket Club until they moved to Sportpark Westvliet.	
Sportpark Harga	Schiedam	Unknown	Has held a single Women's One Day International between Netherlands Women and Japan Women in 2003	
Sportpark Het Loopveld	Amstelveen	Unknown	Has held a single Women's One Day International between Ireland Women and West Indies Women in 2003	
Sportpark Hofbrouckerlaan	Oegstgeest	Unknown	Has held a single Women's One Day International between Netherlands Women and Scotland Women in 2003	
Sportpark Het Schootsveld	Deventer	Unknown	Has held four Women's One Day Internationals, three first-class matches and three List A matches	
Sportpark Klein Zwitserland	The Hague	Unknown	Has held a single Women's One Day International between Japan Women and Scotland Women in 2003	
Sportpark Koninklijke HFC	Haarlem	Unknown	Has held ten Women's One Day Internationals	
Sportpark Laag Zestienhoven	Rotterdam	Unknown	Has held a single Women's One Day International between Ireland Women and Pakistan Women in 2003	
Sportpark Maarschalkerweerd	Utrecht	Unknown	Has held six Women's One Day Internationals, five Women's Twenty20 Internationals and a single first-class match	
Sportpark Nieuw Hanenburg	The Hague	Unknown	Has held a single Women's One Day International between Netherlands Women and Ireland Women in 2003	
Sportpark Thurlede	Schiedam	Unknown	Has held two One Day Internationals, Women's One Day International and four List A matches	
Sportpark Westvliet	Voorburg	Unknown	Has held four One Day Internationals, which includes the four List A matches held there	
VRA Cricket Ground	Amstelveen	Unknown	Has held sixteen One Day Internationals, five Women's One Day Internationals, four first-class matches and 25 List A matches	

† = Defunct venue for internationals.
