= List of women's Twenty20 International cricket grounds =

A total of 85 countries have hosted at least one match of women's Twenty20 International cricket.

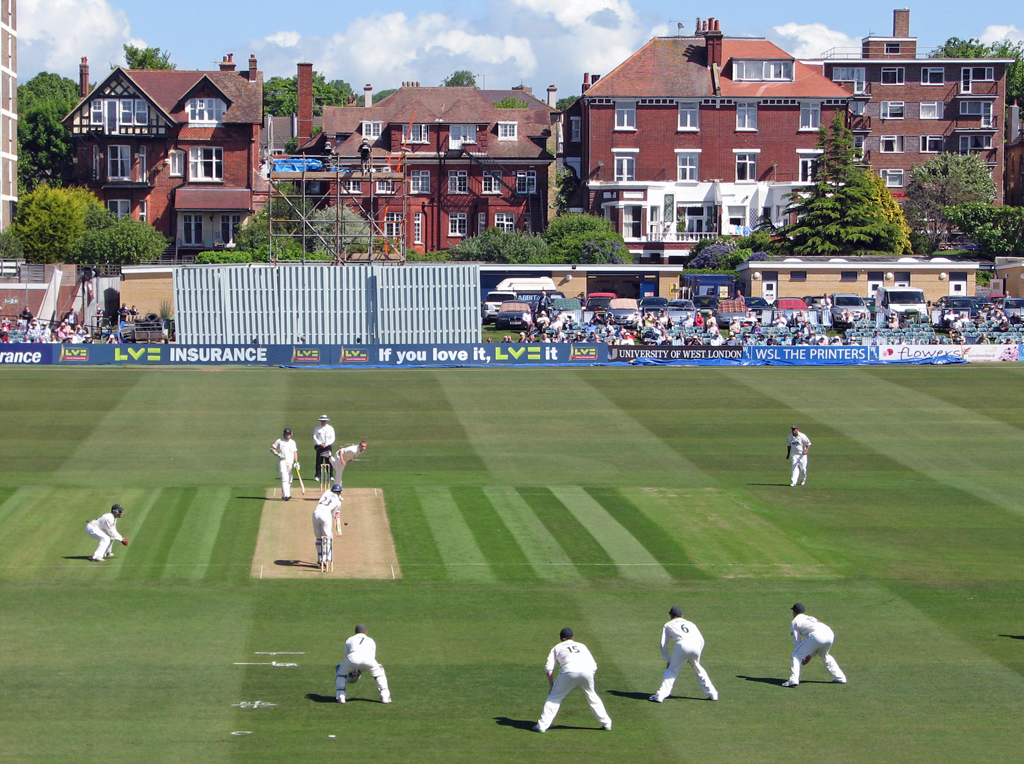
The County Ground, Hove (pictured above), located in the English county of Sussex, hosted the first women's Twenty20 International in 2004.

In total, 270 cricket grounds have hosted at least one women's Twenty20 International (WT20I) cricket match. A total of 85 countries have hosted at least one women's T20I match. England have provided the most venues (27). There have also been numerous venues used in countries outside of the traditional cricket playing nations since the ICC announced that all Twenty20 matches between women's international teams of member nations would be eligible for have the WT20I status. The venue that has hosted the most Women's Twenty20 Internationals is the Gahanga International Cricket Stadium in Kigali, which has hosted 157 matches across its two grounds.

== List of grounds ==
Note: Grounds marked with a dagger (†) have had matches played on multiple fields within the venue, but are counted as a single ground for the purposes of this list.

Last updated: 22 November 2026 (WT20I 3091).

Ground	City	Country	First match	Last match	No. of T20Is	Refs
County Ground	Hove	England	5 August 2004	25 May 2026	11	
County Ground	Taunton	England	2 September 2005	2 June 2026	23	
County Ground	Derby	England	5 August 2006	20 May 2026	11	
Allan Border Field	Brisbane	Australia	18 October 2006	24 September 2024	10	
Gardens Oval	Darwin	Australia	19 July 2007	19 July 2007	1	
Bath Cricket Club Ground	Bath	England	12 August 2007	13 August 2007	2	
Melbourne Cricket Ground	Melbourne	Australia	1 February 2008	8 March 2020	8	
Bert Sutcliffe Oval	Lincoln	New Zealand	6 March 2008	24 February 2015	2	
Kenure	Rush	Ireland	27 June 2008	27 June 2008	1	
Sportpark Maarschalkerweerd	Utrecht	Netherlands	1 July 2008	13 June 2025	34	
Sportpark Het Schootsveld	Deventer	Netherlands	6 July 2008	14 August 2019	13	
Wellington College	Crowthorne	England	1 August 2008	1 August 2008	1	
County Ground	Northampton	England	22 August 2008	17 May 2024	8	
Hurstville Oval	Sydney	Australia	28 October 2008	28 October 2008	1	
Sydney Cricket Ground	Sydney	Australia	15 February 2009	15 February 2026	5	
The Vineyard	Dublin	Ireland	25 May 2009	25 May 2009	1	
The Village	Malahide	Ireland	28 May 2009	30 July 2021	5	
Observatory Lane	Dublin	Ireland	29 May 2009	6 August 2009	2	
Trent Bridge	Nottingham	England	18 June 2009	28 June 2025	2	
The Oval	London	England	19 June 2009	2 July 2026	7	
Lord's	London	England	21 June 2009	5 July 2026	7	
Boland Bank Park	Paarl	South Africa	25 October 2009	7 December 2025	10	
Newlands Cricket Ground	Cape Town	South Africa	26 October 2009	5 December 2025	18	
Warner Park	Basseterre	Saint Kitts and Nevis	9 November 2009	31 January 2025	19	
Bellerive Oval	Hobart	Australia	21 February 2010	30 January 2024	6	
Wellington Regional Stadium	Wellington	New Zealand	22 February 2010	22 March 2026	8	
Lancaster Park	Christchurch	New Zealand	28 February 2010	28 February 2010	1	
Bandra Kurla Complex Ground	Mumbai	India	4 March 2010	8 March 2010	3	
St Mary's Park	Cayon	Saint Kitts and Nevis	21 April 2010	24 April 2010	3	
Darren Sammy National Cricket Stadium	Gros Islet	Saint Lucia	13 May 2010	8 July 2023	17	
Kensington Oval	Bridgetown	Barbados	16 May 2010	22 December 2022	18	
County Ground	Chelmsford	England	29 June 2010	28 May 2026	15	
Rose Bowl	Southampton	England	1 July 2010	20 June 2026	11	
Absa Puk Oval †	Potchefstroom	South Africa	14 October 2010	16 October 2010	8	
Witrand Cricket Field	Potchefstroom	South Africa	16 October 2010	16 October 2010	1	
Nondescripts Cricket Club Ground	Colombo	Sri Lanka	19 November 2010	30 March 2018	5	
Saxton Oval	Nelson	New Zealand	30 December 2010	24 March 2024	6	
Adelaide Oval	Adelaide	Australia	12 January 2011	21 February 2026	8	
Manuka Oval	Canberra	Australia	16 January 2011	19 February 2026	18	
Sardar Patel Stadium	Ahmedabad	India	22 January 2011	24 January 2011	3	
Queen's Park	Invercargill	New Zealand	18 February 2011	5 March 2014	7	
Colts Cricket Club Ground	Colombo	Sri Lanka	24 April 2011	21 September 2018	5	
Singhalese Sports Club Cricket Ground	Colombo	Sri Lanka	24 April 2011	12 May 2023	7	
Toby Howe Cricket Ground	Billericay	England	23 June 2011	23 June 2011	1	
County Ground	Bristol	England	25 June 2011	27 June 2026	14	
Clifton College Close Ground	Bristol	England	25 June 2011	25 June 2011	1	
Taunton Vale Sports Club Ground	Taunton	England	26 June 2011	26 June 2011	1	
Officers Club Services Ground	Aldershot	England	27 June 2011	27 June 2011	1	
Progress Park	Grenville	Grenada	6 September 2011	7 September 2011	2	
Providence Stadium	Providence	Guyana	10 September 2011	20 November 2019	16	
Senwes Park	Potchefstroom	South Africa	27 October 2011	10 February 2026	12	
North Sydney Oval	Sydney	Australia	20 January 2012	22 October 2026	15	
Stadium Australia	Sydney	Australia	1 February 2012	9 November 2014	3	
Sir Vivian Richards Stadium	St. John's	Antigua and Barbuda	18 February 2012	11 December 2022	16	
Seddon Park	Hamilton	New Zealand	19 February 2012	17 March 2026	9	
Eden Park	Auckland	New Zealand	22 February 2012	20 March 2026	5	
Windsor Park	Roseau	Dominica	22 February 2012	23 February 2012	2	
ACA-VDCA Stadium	Visakhapatnam	India	18 March 2012	23 December 2025	8	
Queen's Park Oval	Port of Spain	Trinidad and Tobago	6 May 2012	9 May 2012	3	
Haslegrave Ground	Loughborough	England	23 June 2012	5 July 2013	6	
St Lawrence Ground	Canterbury	England	26 June 2012	23 May 2026	4	
Castle Avenue	Dublin	Ireland	28 August 2012	3 June 2026	13	
Riverside Ground	Chester-le-Street	England	8 September 2012	10 September 2022	3	
Old Trafford	Manchester	England	10 September 2012	26 June 2026	7	
Sher-e-Bangla National Stadium	Dhaka	Bangladesh	11 September 2012	4 April 2024	12	
Arundel Castle Cricket Ground	Arundel	England	16 September 2012	16 September 2012	1	
Galle International Stadium	Galle	Sri Lanka	26 September 2012	1 October 2012	12	
Moors Sports Club Ground	Colombo	Sri Lanka	3 October 2012	3 October 2012	1	
R. Premadasa Stadium	Colombo	Sri Lanka	4 October 2012	26 May 2015	11	
Guanggong International Cricket Stadium	Guangzhou	China	28 October 2012	31 October 2012	4	
Junction Oval	Melbourne	Australia	22 January 2013	2 March 2020	12	
Reliance Stadium	Vadodara	India	2 April 2013	5 April 2013	3	
Scorers	Solihull	England	8 July 2013	10 September 2014	5	
Claremont Road	Dublin	Ireland	16 July 2013	26 May 2019	11	
Anglesea Road	Dublin	Ireland	27 July 2013	27 July 2013	1	
West End Park International Cricket Stadium	Doha	Qatar	19 January 2014	14 February 2026	27	
Dr PVG Raju ACA Sports Complex	Vizianagaram	India	25 January 2014	26 January 2014	2	
Bay Oval	Mount Maunganui	New Zealand	8 March 2014	15 March 2026	7	
Sheikh Kamal International Stadium	Cox's Bazar	Bangladesh	8 March 2014	6 October 2018	8	
Sylhet International Cricket Stadium †	Sylhet	Bangladesh	23 March 2014	2 May 2026	58	
Kerrydale Oval	Gold Coast	Australia	30 August 2014	5 September 2014	4	
Edgbaston	Birmingham	England	7 September 2014	17 June 2026	24	
Arnos Vale Stadium	Kingstown	Saint Vincent and the Grenadines	23 September 2014	23 March 2026	6	
Mercantile Cricket Association Ground	Colombo	Sri Lanka	26 October 2014	26 October 2014	1	
M. Chinnaswamy Stadium	Bangalore	India	30 November 2014	28 March 2016	8	
Sharjah Cricket Stadium	Sharjah	United Arab Emirates	15 January 2015	18 October 2024	21	
Cobham Oval	Whangārei	New Zealand	19 February 2015	20 February 2015	2	
Sophia Gardens	Cardiff	Wales	31 August 2015	31 August 2015	1	
Southend Club Cricket Stadium	Karachi	Pakistan	30 September 2015	28 May 2022	8	
National Cricket Stadium	St. George's	Grenada	29 October 2015	3 March 2026	6	
Hagley Oval	Christchurch	New Zealand	15 November 2015	25 March 2026	5	
Terdthai Cricket Ground	Bangkok	Thailand	5 December 2015	14 February 2026	73	
Wanderers Stadium	Johannesburg	South Africa	21 February 2016	25 April 2026	6	
JSCA International Stadium Complex	Ranchi	India	22 February 2016	26 February 2016	3	
Basin Reserve	Wellington	New Zealand	28 February 2016	29 March 2024	6	
Pukekura Park	New Plymouth	New Zealand	4 March 2016	20 March 2018	2	
Kingsmead	Durban	South Africa	4 March 2016	19 April 2026	6	
Feroz Shah Kotla	Delhi	India	15 March 2016	30 March 2016	6	
MA Chidambaram Stadium	Chennai	India	16 March 2016	9 July 2024	7	
PCA Stadium	Mohali	India	18 March 2016	27 March 2016	3	
VCA Stadium	Nagpur	India	18 March 2016	21 March 2016	2	
HPCA Stadium	Dharamshala	India	22 March 2016	24 March 2016	2	
Wankhede Stadium	Mumbai	India	31 March 2016	10 December 2023	4	
Eden Gardens	Kolkata	India	3 April 2016	3 April 2016	1	
Bready Cricket Club	Magheramason	Northern Ireland	5 September 2016	23 July 2022	6	
ACA–KDCA Cricket Ground	Mulapadu	India	18 November 2016	22 November 2016	3	
Asian Institute of Technology Ground	Bangkok	Thailand	26 November 2016	30 November 2025	46	
Simonds Stadium	Victoria	Australia	19 February 2017	19 February 2017	1	
Coolidge Cricket Ground	Saint George Parish	Antigua and Barbuda	19 October 2017	2 July 2021	4	
Buffalo Park	East London	South Africa	16 February 2018	24 November 2024	11	
Centurion Park	Centurion	South Africa	21 February 2018	30 November 2024	3	
Brabourne Stadium	Mumbai	India	22 March 2018	20 December 2022	10	
Diamond Oval	Kimberley	South Africa	17 May 2018	8 December 2023	3	
Mangaung Oval	Bloemfontein	South Africa	19 May 2018	20 May 2018	2	
Kinrara Academy Oval	Kuala Lumpur	Malaysia	3 June 2018	25 June 2022	39	
Selangor Turf Club	Kuala Lumpur	Malaysia	3 June 2018	6 June 2026	21	
Sydney Parade (Note: Pembroke Cricket Club is located at Sydney Parade so although these are credited to two different grounds, they are not.)	Dublin	Ireland	1 July 2018	23 July 2025	11	
VRA Cricket Ground	Amstelveen	Netherlands	7 July 2018	16 August 2024	16	
Selangor Turf Club	Kuala Lumpur	Malaysia	9 August 2018	12 December 2024	20	
UKM-YSD Cricket Oval	Bangi	Malaysia	12 August 2018	10 June 2026	46	
Botswana Cricket Association Ovals †	Gaborone	Botswana	20 August 2018	11 April 2026	139	
Los Pinos Polo Club †	Bogotá	Colombia	23 August 2018	26 August 2018	7	
Free Trade Zone Sports Complex	Katunayake	Sri Lanka	19 September 2018	25 September 2018	2	
Colombo Cricket Club Ground	Colombo	Sri Lanka	22 September 2018	24 September 2018	2	
Brian Lara Stadium	San Fernando	Trinidad and Tobago	28 September 2018	6 October 2018	3	
Yeonhui Cricket Ground	Incheon	South Korea	3 November 2018	13 October 2024	23	
Sparta Recreational Club	Walvis Bay	Namibia	5 January 2019	10 January 2019	5	
National Stadium	Abuja	Nigeria	26 January 2019	29 January 2019	5	
Barsapara Cricket Stadium	Guwahati	India	4 March 2019	9 March 2019	3	
P. Sara Oval	Colombo	Sri Lanka	24 March 2019	12 July 2023	6	
United Ground	Windhoek	Namibia	1 April 2019	2 May 2023	18	
Lugogo Stadium	Kampala	Uganda	6 April 2019	26 October 2025	18	
Kyambogo Cricket Oval	Kampala	Uganda	7 April 2019	7 April 2019	2	
Indian Association Ground	Singapore	Singapore	18 April 2019	26 August 2023	11	
Udayana Cricket Ground	Jimbaran	Indonesia	23 April 2019	12 April 2025	27	
Las Caballerizas	Mexico City	Mexico	26 April 2019	17 November 2024	3	
Takashinga Sports Club	Harare	Zimbabwe	5 May 2019	7 October 2026	14	
Old Hararians	Harare	Zimbabwe	5 May 2019	11 May 2019	8	
Independence Park †	Port Vila	Vanuatu	6 May 2019	10 May 2019	15	
Harare Sports Club	Harare	Zimbabwe	12 May 2019	2 April 2024	9	
LC de Villiers Oval	Pretoria	South Africa	15 May 2019	15 May 2019	1	
Central Broward Regional Park Stadium	Lauderhill	United States	17 May 2019	19 May 2019	3	
City Oval	Pietermaritzburg	South Africa	18 May 2019	19 May 2019	2	
Willowmoore Park	Benoni	South Africa	22 May 2019	27 April 2026	10	
College Field	St Peter Port	Guernsey	31 May 2019	31 May 2019	1	
Gahanga International Cricket Stadium †	Kigali	Rwanda	18 June 2019	20 June 2026	157	
La Manga Club †	Murcia	Spain	26 June 2019	30 August 2021	16	
Faleata Oval †	Apia	Samoa	9 July 2019	13 July 2019	14	
Cricket Ground, Parc du Grand Blottereau	Nantes	France	31 July 2019	3 August 2019	12	
Lochlands	Arbroath	Scotland	31 August 2019	7 September 2019	10	
Forthill	Dundee	Scotland	31 August 2019	7 September 2019	10	
Lalabhai Contractor Stadium	Surat	India	24 September 2019	4 October 2019	4	
Lima Cricket and Football Club	Lima	Peru	3 October 2019	6 October 2019	11	
Gaddafi Stadium	Lahore	Pakistan	26 October 2019	16 November 2019	6	
Saint Andrews International High School	Blantyre	Malawi	6 November 2019	10 November 2019	7	
Pokhara Rangasala	Pokhara	Nepal	2 December 2019	7 December 2019	4	
Los Reyes Polo Club	Guácima	Costa Rica	13 December 2019	26 April 2026	9	
Friendship Oval	Dasmariñas	Philippines	21 December 2019	29 December 2023	7	
Oman Cricket Academy Ground †	Muscat	Oman	4 February 2020	7 February 2026	46	
Sydney Showground Stadium	Sydney	Australia	21 February 2020	3 March 2020	4	
WACA Ground	Perth	Australia	22 February 2020	24 February 2020	5	
Seebarn Cricket Ground	Lower Austria	Austria	12 August 2020	9 June 2024	31	
Ekana Cricket Stadium	Lucknow	India	20 March 2021	23 March 2021	3	
McLean Park	Napier	New Zealand	30 March 2021	30 March 2021	1	
Stormont	Belfast	Northern Ireland	24 May 2021	27 May 2021	4	
Bayer Uerdingen Cricket Ground	Krefeld	Germany	8 July 2021	28 July 2024	16	
Roma Cricket Ground	Rome	Italy	9 August 2021	29 May 2025	17	
Guttsta Wicked Cricket Ground	Kolsva	Sweden	29 August 2021	29 May 2022	7	
Carrara Oval	Gold Coast	Australia	7 October 2021	10 October 2021	3	
Reforma Athletic Club	Naucalpan	Mexico	18 October 2021	16 November 2024	14	
ICC Academy Ground †	Dubai	United Arab Emirates	22 November 2021	3 October 2023	22	
John Davies Oval	Queenstown	New Zealand	9 February 2022	9 December 2023	3	
Tafawa Balewa Square Cricket Oval	Lagos	Nigeria	28 March 2022	28 March 2026	40	
Trans Namib Ground	Windhoek	Namibia	20 April 2022	26 April 2022	10	
Malek Cricket Ground	Ajman	United Arab Emirates	27 April 2022	30 April 2022	4	
Dreux Sport Cricket Club	Dreux	France	5 May 2022	8 May 2022	8	
Tribhuvan University International Cricket Ground	Kirtipur	Nepal	16 May 2022	1 February 2026	29	
IPRC Cricket Ground	Kigali	Rwanda	9 June 2022	15 June 2023	20	
Rangiri Dambulla International Stadium	Dambulla	Sri Lanka	23 June 2022	4 August 2026	21	
Grainville Cricket Ground	St Saviour	Jersey	25 June 2022	14 June 2026	13	
Sportpark Harga	Schiedam	Netherlands	28 June 2022	30 May 2024	4	
Sportpark Westvliet	The Hague	Netherlands	30 June 2022	1 July 2022	3	
New Road	Worcester	England	23 July 2022	23 July 2022	1	
Enjabulweni Cricket Ground	Manzini	Eswatini	29 July 2022	31 July 2022	6	
Moara Vlasiei Cricket Ground	Ilfov County	Romania	27 August 2022	18 October 2026	48	
The Grange	Edinburgh	Scotland	5 September 2022	4 June 2026	8	
Sheikh Zayed Cricket Stadium †	Abu Dhabi	United Arab Emirates	18 September 2022	7 May 2024	43	
Vanuatu Cricket Ground †	Port Vila	Vanuatu	3 October 2022	8 September 2023	35	
Sao Fernando Polo and Cricket Club	Itaguaí	Brazil	13 October 2022	16 October 2022	4	
Kaizuka Cricket Ground	Kaizuka	Japan	27 October 2022	30 October 2022	4	
Desert Springs Cricket Ground	Almería	Spain	11 November 2022	24 October 2023	24	
Royal Chiangmai Golf Club	Chiang Mai	Thailand	29 November 2022	3 December 2022	4	
University Oval	Dunedin	New Zealand	4 December 2022	18 March 2025	5	
DY Patil Stadium	Navi Mumbai	India	9 December 2022	19 December 2024	8	
Gymkhana Club Ground	Nairobi	Kenya	13 December 2022	21 December 2022	14	
ISF Sports Ground	Phnom Penh	Cambodia	21 December 2022	23 December 2022	6	
Morodok Techo National Stadium	Phnom Penh	Cambodia	8 February 2023	12 February 2023	5	
St George's Park	Gqeberha	South Africa	14 February 2023	20 February 2023	5	
Albert Park †	Suva	Fiji	11 March 2023	15 September 2025	32	
AZ Group Cricket Oval	Phnom Penh	Cambodia	30 April 2023	15 May 2023	11	
Zhejiang University of Technology Cricket Field	Hangzhou	China	25 May 2023	24 August 2026	39	
FB Playing Fields	St Clement	Jersey	29 May 2023	2 June 2023	7	
Mission Road Ground	Mong Kok	Hong Kong	14 June 2023	11 May 2026	16	
Poços Oval	Poços de Caldas	Brazil	17 June 2023	25 September 2026	15	
King George V Sports Ground	Castel	Guernsey	24 June 2023	5 July 2025	4	
Bayuemas Oval	Pandamaran	Malaysia	22 August 2023	22 November 2026	65	
Kerava National Cricket Ground	Kerava	Finland	25 August 2023	20 July 2025	9	
Tikkurila Cricket Ground	Vantaa	Finland	25 August 2023	27 August 2023	4	
Turf City B Cricket Ground	Singapore	Singapore	26 August 2023	26 August 2023	1	
National Stadium	Karachi	Pakistan	1 September 2023	15 May 2026	11	
Woodley Cricket Field	Los Angeles	United States	4 September 2023	10 September 2023	12	
Marina Ground	Gouvia	Greece	5 September 2023	10 May 2026	27	
Dubai International Cricket Stadium	Dubai	United Arab Emirates	26 September 2023	13 September 2026	32	
St Albans Club	Buenos Aires	Argentina	13 October 2023	17 March 2025	15	
Zohur Ahmed Chowdhury Stadium	Chittagong	Bangladesh	25 October 2023	29 October 2023	3	
Hong Kong Cricket Club	Wong Nai Chung Gap	Hong Kong	15 November 2023	19 November 2023	8	
Entebbe Cricket Oval	Entebbe	Uganda	9 December 2023	14 November 2026	43	
Lloyd Elsmore Park †	Auckland	New Zealand	17 January 2024	21 January 2024	12	
Johor Cricket Academy Oval	Johor Bahru	Malaysia	4 February 2024	6 February 2024	3	
Achimota Oval †	Accra	Ghana	7 March 2024	13 March 2024	11	
The Sevens Stadium	Dubai	United Arab Emirates	18 April 2024	18 April 2024	1	
Europa Sports Park	Gibraltar	Gibraltar	20 April 2024	16 December 2024	5	
Norman Edwards Memorial Ground	Winchester	England	5 May 2024	6 May 2024	3	
Royal Brussels Cricket Club	Waterloo	Belgium	19 May 2024	20 May 2024	4	
Headingley	Leeds	England	19 May 2024	23 June 2026	6	
Vinoř Cricket Ground	Prague	Czech Republic	14 June 2024	6 September 2026	31	
Happy Valley Ground †	Episkopi	Cyprus	17 June 2024	20 June 2026	29	
Mahinda Rajapaksa International Cricket Stadium	Hambantota	Sri Lanka	24 June 2024	28 June 2024	3	
Ekeberg Cricket Ground †	Oslo	Norway	10 August 2024	11 August 2024	6	
Marsa Sports Club	Marsa	Malta	17 August 2024	5 May 2025	12	
Wanderers Cricket Ground	Windhoek	Namibia	6 September 2024	14 September 2024	9	
Sikh Union Club Ground	Nairobi	Kenya	10 September 2024	14 September 2024	5	
Køge Cricket Club †	Køge	Denmark	14 September 2024	15 September 2024	8	
Lisicji Jarak Cricket Ground	Belgrade	Serbia	14 September 2024	6 September 2026	12	
Multan Cricket Stadium	Multan	Pakistan	16 September 2024	20 September 2024	3	
Great Barrier Reef Arena	Mackay	Australia	22 September 2024	19 September 2024	2	
Simar Cricket Ground	Rome	Italy	28 September 2024	29 May 2025	11	
Sano International Cricket Ground †	Sano	Japan	1 October 2024	13 September 2026	17	
National Stadium	Singapore	Singapore	21 October 2024	30 November 2025	23	
Mladost Cricket Ground	Zagreb	Croatia	26 October 2024	27 October 2024	4	
Gelephu International Cricket Ground	Gelephu	Bhutan	21 December 2024	29 January 2026	13	
N'Du Stadium	Nouméa	New Caledonia	10 March 2025	14 March 2025	8	
Santarem Cricket Ground	Santarém	Portugal	7 April 2025	9 April 2025	3	
High Performance Oval	Windhoek	Namibia	8 April 2025	30 July 2026	30	
Grand Prairie Stadium	Dallas	United States	25 April 2025	29 April 2025	3	
Estonian National Cricket and Rugby Field †	Tallinn	Estonia	15 May 2025	25 July 2026	11	
Stars Arena	Hofstade	Belgium	28 May 2025	29 May 2025	4	
Amini Park	Port Moresby	Papua New Guinea	15 June 2025	11 August 2026	8	
Three Ws Oval	Bridgetown	Barbados	20 June 2025	23 June 2025	3	
Vasil Levski National Sports Academy	Sofia	Bulgaria	7 July 2025	28 June 2026	12	
Hazelaarweg Stadium	Rotterdam	Netherlands	20 August 2025	27 August 2025	12	
Ishoj Cricket Club	Ishøj	Denmark	29 August 2025	31 August 2025	5	
Albertslund Cricket Club	Albertslund	Denmark	29 August 2025	28 June 2026	9	
Namibia Cricket Ground	Windhoek	Namibia	31 August 2025	6 September 2025	10	
New Farnley Cricket Club	Leeds	England	31 August 2025	4 September 2025	5	
Pierre Werner Cricket Ground	Walferdange	Luxembourg	12 September 2025	23 August 2026	9	
Queens Sports Club	Bulawayo	Zimbabwe	5 October 2025	19 September 2026	7	
Gymkhana Club Ground	Dar es Salaam	Tanzania	4 November 2025	6 November 2025	4	
The Sports Hub	Thiruvananthapuram	India	26 December 2025	30 December 2025	3	
Mulpani International Cricket Ground	Kageshwari-Manohara	Nepal	18 January 2026	1 February 2026	14	
Kolej Tuanku Ja’afar Cricket Oval	Mantin	Malaysia	15 May 2026	6 June 2026	8	
Sport and Swimming Club	Karlsruhe	Germany	10 July 2026	12 July 2026	5	
Embrach Cricket Ground	Embrach	Switzerland	27 July 2026	31 July 2026	10	
St. George's College Ground	Quilmes	Argentina	29 July 2026	2 August 2026	7	
GelsenTrabPark	Gelsenkirchen	Germany	28 August 2026	30 August 2026	5	
Kōrogi Sports Park	Nisshin	Japan	17 September 2026	22 September 2026	7	
Shaheed Veer Narayan Singh International Cricket Stadium	Raipur	India	16 October 2026	20 October 2026	3	
Texcoco Municipal Baseball Complex	Texcoco de Mora	Mexico	24 October 2026	25 October 2026	3	
Karwan Cricket Ground	Ajman	United Arab Emirates	12 November 2026	22 November 2026	14	
Seven Districts Ground	Ajman	United Arab Emirates	12 November 2026	22 November 2026	12	

== Grounds by country ==
Last updated: 22 November 2026 (WT20I 3091). (Note: Cricinfo groups the individual countries of the West Indies together, but these have been separated for this list. ESPNcricinfo also counts Welsh grounds under England and grounds from the Republic of Ireland and Northern Ireland together under Ireland; these have also been separated for this list.)

Country	No. of Grounds	First ground used	City	Date of first match	No. of T20Is
Antigua and Barbuda	2	Sir Vivian Richards Stadium	St. John's	18 February 2012	20
Argentina	2	St Albans Club	Buenos Aires	13 October 2023	22
Australia	17	Allan Border Field	Brisbane	18 October 2006	106
Austria	1	Seebarn Cricket Ground	Lower Austria	12 August 2020	31
Bangladesh	4	Sher-e-Bangla National Stadium	Dhaka	11 September 2012	81
Barbados	2	Kensington Oval	Bridgetown	16 May 2010	21
Belgium	2	Royal Brussels Cricket Club	Waterloo	19 May 2024	8
Bhutan	1	Gelephu International Cricket Ground	Gelephu	21 December 2024	13
Botswana	1	Botswana Cricket Association Oval	Gaborone	20 August 2018	139
Brazil	2	Sao Fernando Polo and Cricket Club	Itaguaí	13 October 2022	19
Bulgaria	1	Vasil Levski National Sports Academy	Sofia	7 July 2025	12
Cambodia	3	ISF Sports Ground	Phnom Penh	21 December 2022	22
China	2	Guanggong Cricket Stadium	Guangzhou	28 October 2012	43
Colombia	1	Los Pinos Polo Club	Bogotá	23 August 2018	7
Costa Rica	1	Los Reyes Polo Club	Guácima	13 December 2013	9
Croatia	1	Mladost Cricket Ground	Zagreb	26 October 2024	4
Cyprus	1	Happy Valley Ground	Episkopi	17 June 2024	29
Czech Republic	1	Vinoř Cricket Ground	Prague	26 June 2026	31
Denmark	3	Køge Cricket Club	Køge	14 September 2024	22
Dominica	1	Windsor Park	Roseau	22 February 2012	2
England	27	County Ground	Hove	5 August 2004	181
Estonia	1	Estonian National Cricket and Rugby Field	Tallinn	15 May 2025	11
Eswatini	1	Enjabulweni Cricket Ground	Manzini	29 July 2022	6
Fiji	1	Albert Park	Suva	11 March 2023	32
Finland	2	Kerava National Cricket Ground	Kerava	25 August 2023	13
France	2	Cricket Ground, Parc du Grand Blottereau	Nantes	31 July 2019	20
Germany	3	Bayer Uerdingen Cricket Ground	Krefeld	8 July 2021	26
Ghana	1	Achimota Oval	Accra	7 March 2024	11
Gibraltar	1	Europa Sports Park	Gibraltar	20 April 2024	5
Greece	1	Marina Ground	Gouvia	5 September 2022	27
Grenada	2	Progress Park	Grenville	6 September 2011	8
Guernsey	2	College Field	St Peter Port	31 May 2019	5
Guyana	1	Guyana National Stadium	Providence	10 September 2011	16
Hong Kong	2	Mission Road Ground	Mong Kok	14 June 2023	24
India	22	Bandra Kurla Complex Ground	Mumbai	4 March 2010	92
Indonesia	1	Udayana Cricket Ground	Jimbaran	23 May 2019	27
Ireland	9	Kenure	Rush	27 June 2008	45
Italy	2	Roma Cricket Ground	Rome	9 August 2021	28
Japan	3	Kaizuka Cricket Ground	Kaizuka	27 October 2022	28
Jersey	2	Grainville Cricket Ground	St Saviour	25 June 2022	20
Kenya	2	Gymkhana Club Ground	Nairobi	13 December 2022	19
Luxembourg	1	Pierre Werner Cricket Ground	Walferdange	12 September 2025	9
Malawi	1	Saint Andrews International High School	Blantyre	6 November 2019	7
Malaysia	7	Kinrara Academy Oval	Kuala Lumpur	3 June 2018	202
Malta	1	Marsa Sports Club	Marsa	17 August 2024	12
Mexico	3	Las Caballerizas	Mexico City	26 April 2019	20
Namibia	6	Sparta Recreational Club	Walvis Bay	5 January 2019	82
Nepal	3	Pokhara Rangasala	Pokhara	2 December 2019	47
Netherlands	6	Sportpark Maarschalkerweerd	Utrecht	1 July 2008	82
New Caledonia	1	N'Du Stadium	Nouméa	10 March 2025	8
New Zealand	15	Bert Sutcliffe Oval	Lincoln	6 March 2008	81
Nigeria	2	National Stadium	Abuja	26 January 2019	45
Northern Ireland	2	Bready Cricket Club	Magheramason	5 September 2016	10
Norway	1	Ekeberg Cricket Ground	Oslo	10 August 2024	6
Oman	1	Oman Cricket Academy Ground	Muscat	4 February 2020	46
Pakistan	4	Southend Club Cricket Stadium	Karachi	30 September 2015	28
Papua New Guinea	1	Amini Park	Port Moresby	15 June 2025	8
Peru	1	Lima Cricket and Football Club	Lima	4 October 2019	11
Philippines	1	Friendship Oval	Dasmariñas	21 December 2019	7
Portugal	1	Santarem Cricket Ground	Santarém	7 April 2025	3
Qatar	1	West End Park Stadium	Doha	19 January 2014	27
Romania	1	Moara Vlasiei Cricket Ground	Ilfov County	27 August 2022	48
Rwanda	2	Gahanga International Cricket Stadium	Kigali	18 June 2019	177
Saint Kitts and Nevis	2	Warner Park	Basseterre	9 November 2009	22
Saint Lucia	1	Daren Sammy Cricket Ground	Gros Islet	13 May 2010	17
Saint Vincent and the Grenadines	1	Arnos Vale Stadium	Kingstown	23 September 2014	6
Samoa	1	Faleata Oval	Apia	8 July 2019	14
Scotland	3	Lochlands	Arbroath	31 August 2019	28
Serbia	1	Lisicji Jarak Cricket Ground	Belgrade	14 September 2024	12
Singapore	3	Indian Association Ground	Singapore	23 April 2019	35
South Africa	15	Boland Bank Park	Paarl	25 October 2009	98
South Korea	1	Yeonhui Cricket Ground	Incheon	3 November 2018	23
Spain	2	La Manga Club	Murcia	26 June 2019	40
Sri Lanka	12	Nondescripts Cricket Club	Colombo	19 November 2010	76
Sweden	1	[uttsta Wicked Cricket Ground	Kolsva	29 August 2021	7
Switzerland	1	Embrach Cricket Ground	Embrach	27 July 2026	10
Tanzania	1	Gymkhana Club Ground	Dar es Salaam	4 November 2025	4
Thailand	3	Thailand Cricket Ground	Bangkok	5 December 2015	123
Trinidad and Tobago	2	Queen's Park Oval	Port of Spain	6 May 2012	6
Uganda	3	Lugogo Cricket Oval	Kampala	6 April 2019	63
United Arab Emirates	8	Sharjah Cricket Stadium	Sharjah	15 January 2015	149
United States	3	Central Broward Regional Park Stadium	Lauderhill	17 May 2019	18
Vanuatu	2	Independence Park	Port Vila	6 May 2019	50
Wales	1	Sophia Gardens	Cardiff	31 August 2015	1
Zimbabwe	4	Takashinga Sports Club	Harare	5 May 2019	38

== See also ==
- List of Test cricket grounds
- List of women's Test cricket grounds
- List of One Day International cricket grounds
- List of women's One Day International cricket grounds
- List of Twenty20 International cricket grounds
