= De Regt =

De Regt is a Dutch surname meaning "the righteous, the just". Notable people with this name are:

- Ferry de Regt (born 1988), Dutch footballer
- Gyan de Regt (born 2003), Dutch footballer
- Merel de Regt (born 1981), Dutch cricketer
- Rutger de Regt (born 1979), Dutch designer
