= Miskin =

Coordinates: 51.520°N 3.374°W

Miskin: Welsh: Meisgyn
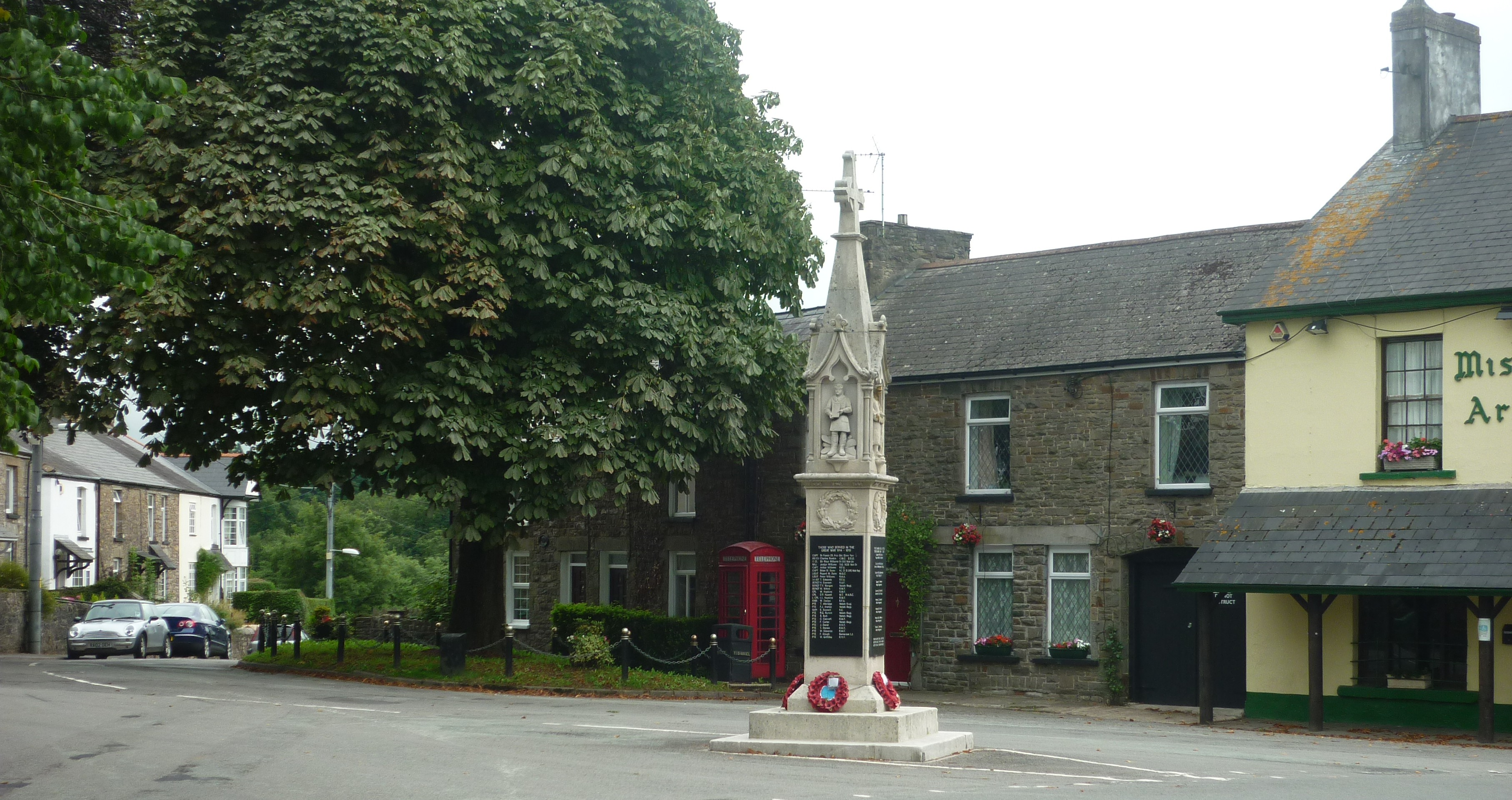
- Village centre with local pub and war memorial

- Location within Rhondda Cynon Taf
- OS grid reference: ST047810
- Principal area: Rhondda Cynon Taf
- Preserved county: Mid Glamorgan
- Country: Wales
- Sovereign state: United Kingdom
- Post town: PONTYCLUN
- Postcode district: CF72
- Dialling code: 01443
- Police: South Wales
- Fire: South Wales
- Ambulance: Welsh
- UK Parliament: Cardiff West
- Senedd Cymru – Welsh Parliament: Pontypridd

Miskin (Welsh: Meisgyn) is a village approximately 2 miles (3 km) south of Llantrisant in the county borough of Rhondda Cynon Taf, Wales.

The origin of the village was a small hamlet known as New Mill, which grew up around New Mill farm. Miskin is part of the Pontyclun electoral ward.

== History ==
The 1841 census records the settlement (originally a small hamlet by the name of New Inn) as having a population of 31. The opening of the Bute and Mwyndy iron ore mines in nearby Talbot Green, in 1852 and 1853 respectively, had a huge impact on the small hamlet of New Mill. The census of 1861 shows that New Mill had become a village, its population now 83 people in 17 households, and of these residents 17 were iron ore miners. By the early 1870s New Mill had become the village of Miskin, with the village centre being based around the inn, which is now The Miskin Arms pub.

The name change from New Mill to Miskin was brought about by Judge Gwilym Williams, and was taken from the medieval commote of Miskin. Williams, a staunch Welsh patriot, lived at Miskin Manor (built 1864), a Victorian L-plan mansion in a neo-Tudor style.

By the 1870s several ironstone mines are evident to the north of the village, and the village's population continued to grow, as skilled miners rather than heavy labourers were needed to extract the ore. The 1871 census records the village's population as 144, with more than half of the miners being immigrants from the depressed copper mining county of Cornwall.

Just off Hensol Road, outside Miskin and between Caergwanafuchaf and Ceulan farms, lie the remains of a Roman auxiliary fort.

The fort was constructed and occupied during the early Flavian period, as part of the Roman military consolidation of South Wales. It would have housed between 500 and 1,000 soldiers, depending on whether the garrison comprised an infantry unit, a part-mounted infantry unit, or, more rarely, a cavalry unit.

The defences consisted of an earthen rampart (vallum), typically faced on both the inner and outer sides with turf and timber. Beyond the rampart were at least two defensive ditches. In its earliest phase, the fort would have featured a timber breastwork and wall-walk atop the rampart, with timber gateways and towers positioned around the circuit.

Within the fort were a range of standard military buildings, including the central headquarters building (principia), the commanding officer’s residence (praetorium), granaries, barrack blocks, stables, workshops and storehouses.

The site is of national importance due to its potential to enhance understanding of the early Roman military presence in Wales, particularly in Glamorgan, where such evidence is limited. Its significance is further increased by its apparent association with large-scale ironworking, which probably began during the fort’s occupation and continued into the late third and early fourth centuries AD. Evidence of close links between Roman military activity and industrial production is rare in Wales.

Approximately 300 metres to the west, near Ty Isaf Farm, is a small “practice fort” measuring around 25 metres square. A further possible practice fort lies about 175 metres to the north of this feature. Source Pontyclun website

== Religion ==
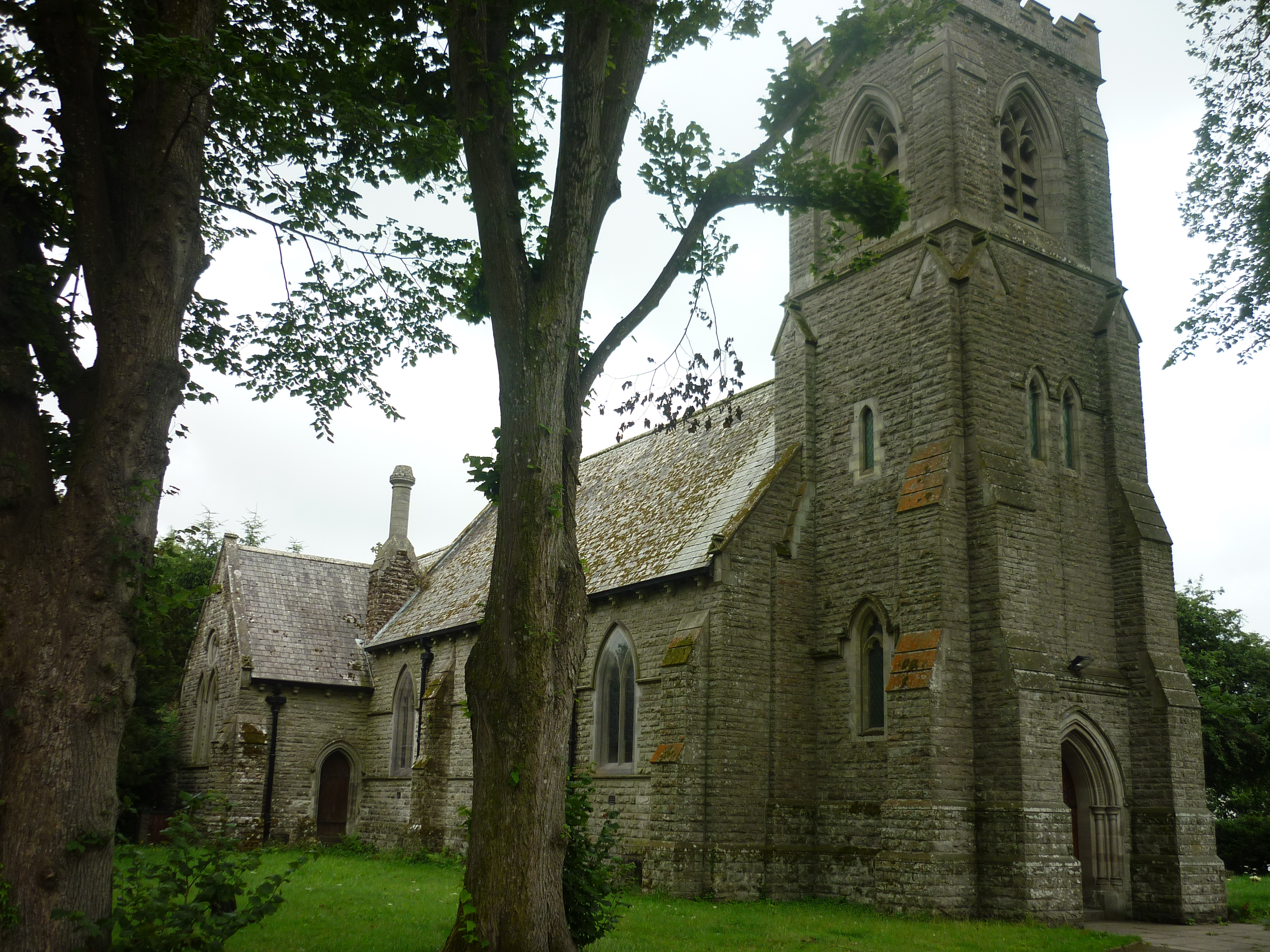
St David's Church, 2010

A church has stood on the site of the current St David's church since 1878. Originally of corrugated iron construction, it was replaced by the current stone church in 1906–07. The land on which the church was built was owned by the Williams family.

Funds for the building of the church were raised by public donations and events, notably the Grand Fete at Miskin Manor which raised over £1,000, with the majority of the funds coming from Emma Eleanor Williams, Gwilym Williams' widow. The church was licensed on 23 December 1907 and consecrated by Right Rev Timothy Rees, Bishop of Llandaff, on Sunday 23 April 1933.

St David's Church was designed by local architect E. M. Bruce Vaughan and has been described as 'earnestly handsome'. The church has an over-buttressed square tower, and is faced with green Quarella stone outside and in. Of note are three stained glass windows by Jessie Bayes, to members of the Williams family.

There is also a large Roman Catholic church, All Hallows, on the outskirts of the village.

== Miskin Mill ==
The Miskin Mill site has been the location of a water-driven corn mill for most of the last 400 years. Since 1929 it has been used by the Scouting movement for camping and training.

== Transport ==
The nearest railway station is at Pontyclun.
