= List of women's Test cricket grounds =

Ten countries have hosted at least one match of women's Test cricket.

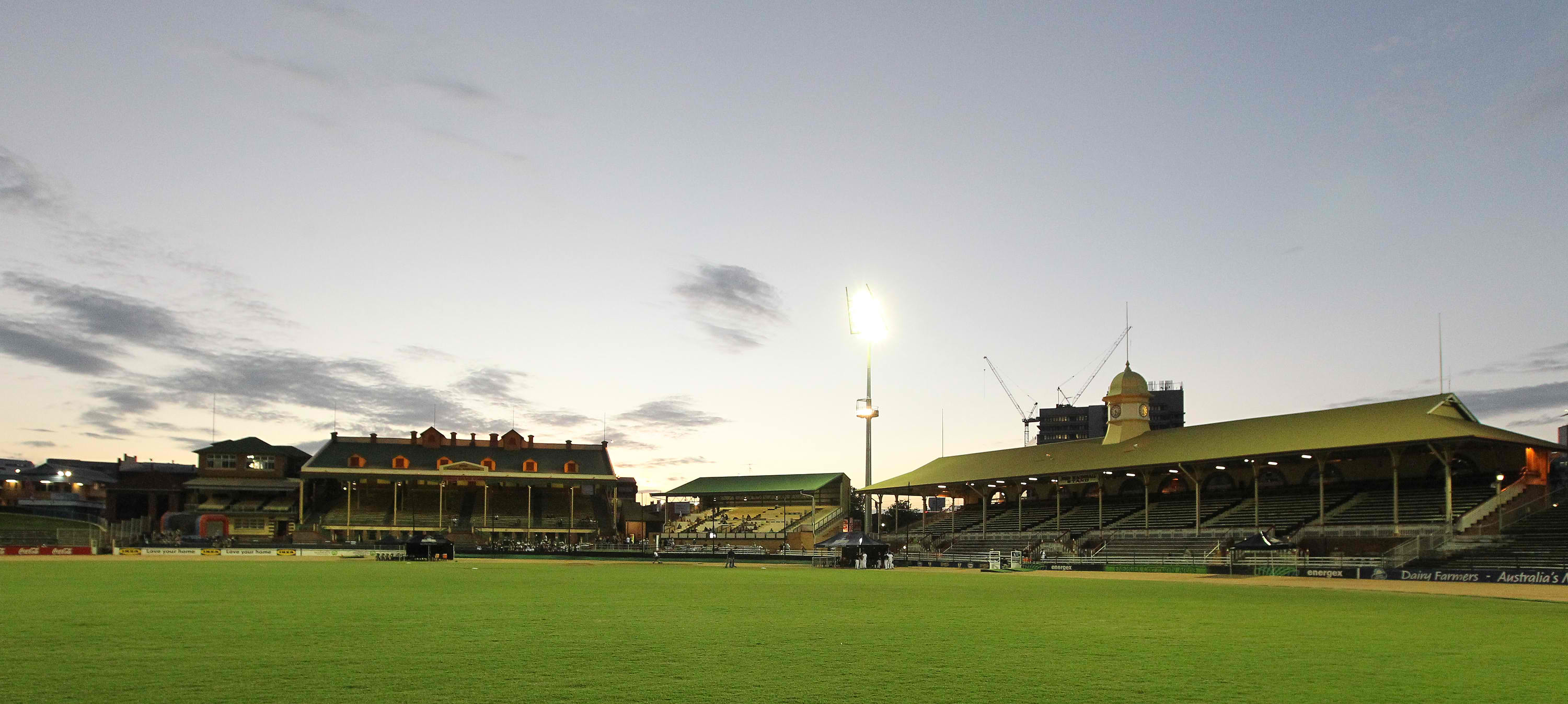
The Brisbane Exhibition Ground (pictured in 2011), located in the Australian city of Brisbane, hosted the inaugural women's Test in 1934, but is no longer used for cricket.

In total, 80 cricket grounds have hosted at least one match of women's Test cricket.

Ten countries have hosted at least one women's Test match, which corresponds to the number of teams that have played at least one Test. However, four of those countries – Ireland, the Netherlands, Pakistan and Sri Lanka – have hosted only a single match, while Jamaica have hosted only two. Consequently, the vast majority of Test venues have been located in only four countries – Australia, England, India and New Zealand. Australian and English venues alone make up over half of the list. Most of the grounds have hosted only a single Test match, with multiple Tests at one venue being the exception rather than the rule. Only four venues have hosted more than four Tests, all located in England – Worcester's New Road ground has hosted nine games, London's Kennington Oval has hosted six, and Scarborough's North Marine Road and the County Ground in Taunton ground have hosted five.

== List of grounds ==
Last updated: 10 July 2025 (Test #153):

No.	Ground	City	Country	First match	Last match	No. of Tests	Refs.
1	Brisbane Exhibition Ground	Brisbane	Australia	28 December 1934	28 December 1934	1	
2	Sydney Cricket Ground	Sydney	Australia	4 January 1935	19 February 1949	2	
3	Melbourne Cricket Ground	Melbourne	Australia	18 January 1935	30 January 2025	3	
4	Lancaster Park	Christchurch	New Zealand	16 February 1935	29 November 1957	2	
5	County Ground	Northampton	England	12 June 1937	12 June 1937	1	
6	Stanley Park	Blackpool	England	26 June 1937	3 July 1986	2	
7	The Oval	London	England	12 July 1937	24 July 1976	6	
8	Basin Reserve	Wellington	New Zealand	20 March 1948	26 January 1990	4	
9	Adelaide Oval	Adelaide	Australia	15 January 1949	18 February 2006	4	
10	Eden Park	Auckland	New Zealand	26 March 1948	27 December 1957	2	
11	North Marine Road Ground	Scarborough	England	16 June 1951	21 August 2004	5	
12	New Road	Worcester	England	30 June 1951	10 July 2009	9	
13	Headingley	Leeds	England	12 June 1954	6 July 2001	3	
14	King's College Oval	Adelaide	Australia	18 January 1957	18 January 1957	1	
15	Junction Oval	Melbourne	Australia	21 February 1958	5 February 1972	3	
16	WACA Ground	Perth	Australia	21 March 1958	6 March 2026	5	
17	St George's Oval	Gqeberha	South Africa	2 December 1960	2 December 1960	1	
18	Wanderers	Johannesburg	South Africa	17 December 1960	24 March 1972	2	
19	Kingsmead	Durban	South Africa	31 December 1960	10 March 1972	2	
20	Newlands	Cape Town	South Africa	13 January 1961	25 February 1972	2	
21	Carisbrook	Dunedin	New Zealand	17 March 1961	8 January 1977	2	
22	Edgbaston	Birmingham	England	15 June 1963	1 July 1979	4	
23	Barton Oval	Adelaide	Australia	27 December 1969	27 December 1969	1	
24	North Sydney Oval	Sydney	Australia	25 January 1969	9 November 2017	3	
25	Hagley Oval	Christchurch	New Zealand	7 March 1969	28 February 1995	3	
26	Cornwall Park	Auckland	New Zealand	28 March 1969	11 January 1992	3	
27	Jarrett Park	Montego Bay	Jamaica	7 May 1976	7 May 1976	1	
28	Sabina Park	Kingston	Jamaica	14 May 1976	14 May 1976	1	
29	Old Trafford	Manchester	England	19 June 1976	19 June 1976	1	
30	M. Chinnaswamy Stadium	Bangalore	India	31 October 1976	31 October 1976	1	
31	M. A. Chidambaram Stadium	Chennai	India	7 November 1976	28 June 2024	2	
32	Feroz Shah Kotla	Delhi	India	12 November 1976	21 January 1984	2	
33	Moin-ul-Haq Stadium	Patna	India	17 November 1976	17 November 1976	1	
34	K. D. Singh Babu Stadium	Lucknow	India	21 November 1976	14 January 2002	4	
35	Maulana Azad Stadium	Jammu	India	27 November 1976	27 November 1976	1	
36	Hale School	Perth	Australia	15 January 1977	15 January 1977	1	
37	University Oval	Sydney	Australia	12 January 1979	12 January 1979	1	
38	Unley Oval	Adelaide	Australia	19 January 1979	19 January 1979	1	
39	Albert Cricket Ground	Melbourne	Australia	26 January 1979	26 January 1979	1	
40	St Lawrence Ground	Canterbury	England	16 June 1979	11 August 2015	3	
41	Trent Bridge	Nottingham	England	23 June 1979	22 June 2023	2	
42	Sardar Vallabhbhai Patel Stadium	Ahmedabad	India	3 February 1984	23 February 1985	2	
43	Wankhede Stadium	Mumbai	India	10 February 1984	21 December 2023	2	
44	The Gabba	Brisbane	Australia	1 January 1985	15 February 2003	2	
45	Central Coast Stadium	Gosford	Australia	12 January 1985	12 January 1985	1	
46	Queen Elizabeth II Oval	Bendigo	Australia	25 January 1985	25 January 1985	1	
47	Barabati Stadium	Cuttack	India	7 March 1985	7 March 1985	1	
48	Harewood Road	Collingham	England	26 June 1986	21 August 1987	2	
49	County Ground	Hove	England	29 August 1987	9 August 2005	2	
50	St Peter's College	Adelaide	Australia	2 February 1991	2 February 1991	1	
51	Punt Road Oval	Melbourne	Australia	9 February 1991	9 February 1991	1	
52	Cooks Gardens	Wanganui	New Zealand	6 February 1992	6 February 1992	1	
53	Pukekura Park	New Plymouth	New Zealand	12 February 1992	12 February 1992	1	
54	Trafalgar Park	Nelson	New Zealand	7 February 1995	7 February 1995	1	
55	Calcutta Cricket and Football Club	Kolkata	India	17 November 1995	17 November 1995	1	
56	Keenan Stadium	Jamshedpur	India	24 November 1995	24 November 1995	1	
57	Lal Bahadur Shastri Stadium	Hyderabad	India	10 December 1995	10 December 1995	1	
58	Arden Street Oval	Melbourne	Australia	8 February 1996	8 February 1996	1	
59	Woodbridge Road	Guildford	England	12 July 1996	6 August 1998	2	
60	Colts Cricket Club Ground	Colombo	Sri Lanka	17 April 1998	17 April 1998	1	
61	St George's Road	Harrogate	England	11 August 1998	11 August 1998	1	
62	Denis Compton Oval	Shenley	England	15 July 1999	7 August 2003	3	
63	College Park	Dublin	Ireland	30 July 2000	30 July 2000	1	
64	Boland Bank Park	Paarl	South Africa	19 March 2002	19 March 2002	1	
65	County Ground	Taunton	England	14 August 2002	27 July 2022	5	
66	Bankstown Oval	Sydney	Australia	22 February 2003	22 January 2011	2	
67	Bilakhiya Stadium	Vapi	India	27 November 2003	27 November 2003	1	
68	National Stadium	Karachi	Pakistan	15 March 2004	15 March 2004	1	
69	Jamia Millia Ground	Delhi	India	21 November 2005	21 November 2005	1	
70	Grace Road	Leicester	England	8 August 2006	8 August 2006	1	
71	Hazelaarweg Stadion	Rotterdam	Netherlands	28 July 2007	28 July 2007	1	
72	Bradman Oval	Bowral	Australia	15 February 2008	15 February 2008	1	
73	Sir Paul Getty's Ground	Wormsley Park	England	11 August 2013	13 August 2014	2	
74	Gangothri Glades Cricket Ground	Mysore	India	16 November 2014	16 November 2014	1	
75	Bristol County Ground	Bristol	England	16 June 2021	16 June 2021	1	
76	Carrara Stadium	Gold Coast	Australia	30 September 2021	30 September 2021	1	
77	Manuka Oval	Canberra	Australia	27 January 2022	27 January 2022	1	
78	DY Patil Stadium	Navi Mumbai	India	14 December 2023	14 December 2023	1	
79	Mangaung Oval	Bloemfontein	South Africa	15 December 2024	15 December 2024	1	
80	Lord's	London	England	10 July 2026	10 July 2026	1	

== Grounds by country ==
List of number of grounds by country up to 10 July 2026 (Test #153):

Country	Grounds	First ground used	City	Date of first match	No. of Tests
Australia	23	Exhibition Ground	Brisbane	28 December 1934	39
England	20	County Ground	Northampton	12 January 1937	56
India	16	M. Chinnaswamy Stadium	Bangalore	31 October 1976	23
Ireland	1	College Park	Dublin	30 July 2000	1
Jamaica	2	Jarrett Park	Montego Bay	7 May 1976	2
Netherlands	1	Hazelaarweg Stadion	Rotterdam	28 July 2007	1
New Zealand	9	Lancaster Park	Christchurch	16 February 1935	19
Pakistan	1	National Stadium	Karachi	15 March 2004	1
South Africa	6	St George's Oval	Gqeberha	2 December 1960	9
Sri Lanka	1	Colts Cricket Club Ground	Colombo	17 April 1998	1

== See also ==
- List of Test cricket grounds
- List of One Day International cricket grounds
- List of women's One Day International cricket grounds
- List of Twenty20 International cricket grounds
- List of women's Twenty20 International cricket grounds
