= Miskin Manor =

Victorian House in mid-19th century in Miskin, south wales

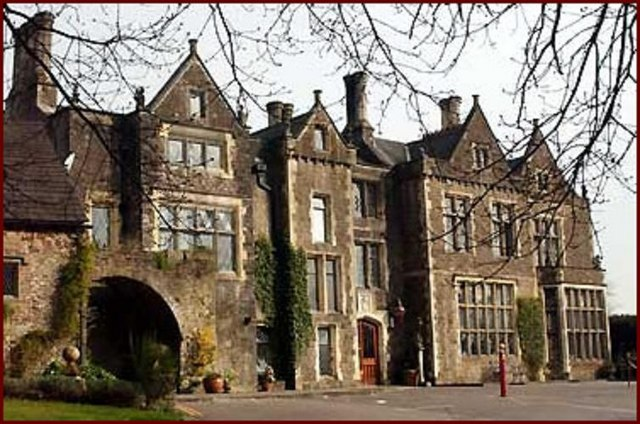

- Location within Wales

General information
- Location: Miskin, Wales, United Kingdom
- Coordinates: 51°30′48″N 3°21′37″W

Miskin Manor is a Victorian manor house built in 1864 in a Tudor style, situated in the village of Miskin in Rhondda Cynon Taf, south Wales. The estate was owned by the Williams family including Rhys Rhys-Williams for many years who were descended from the Welsh bard David Williams. Previously used as a hotel and venue for wedding receptions, it is now currently closed following a period of financial difficulties. It was once filmed for the Doctor Who series 5 finale The Big Bang.

The manor is a Grade II listed building. The gardens and park attached to the house are designated Grade II on the Cadw/ICOMOS Register of Parks and Gardens of Special Historic Interest in Wales.

The Miskin Manor Cricket Club Ground, historically known as Glyn Park in Miskin, Pontyclun, is famous for its setting by the River Ely, originating from the historic Miskin Manor estate, and is considered a prime South Wales cricket venue.

== Gallery ==
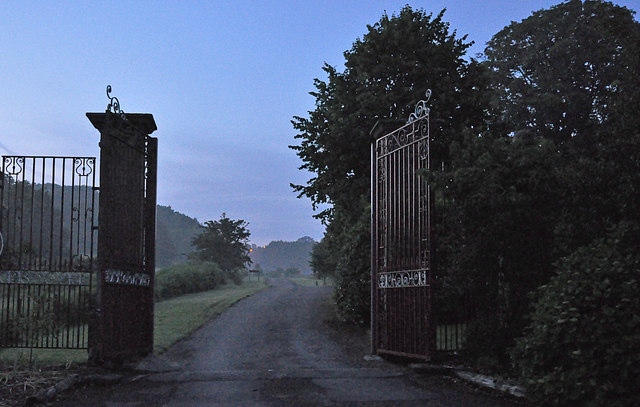

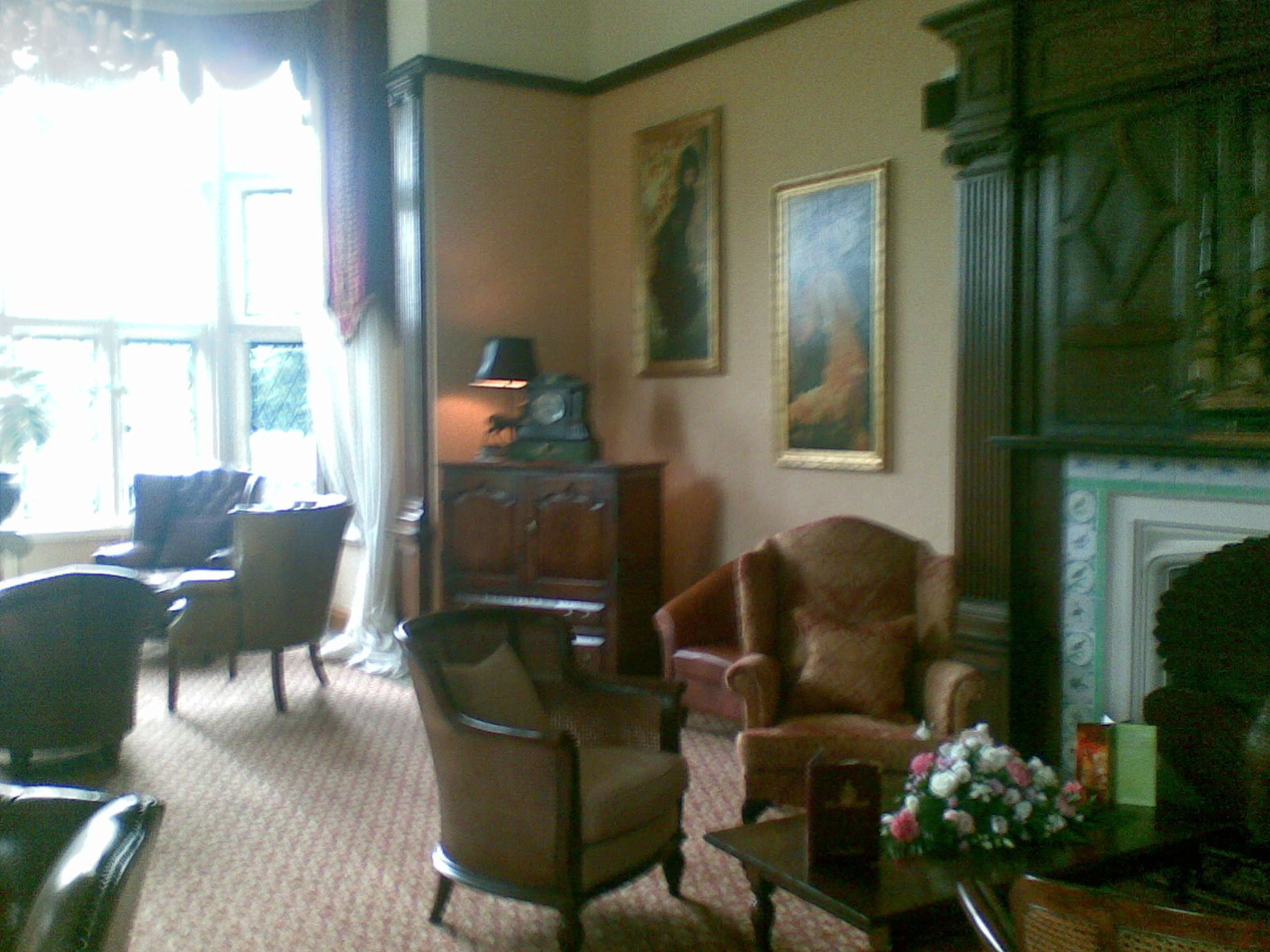

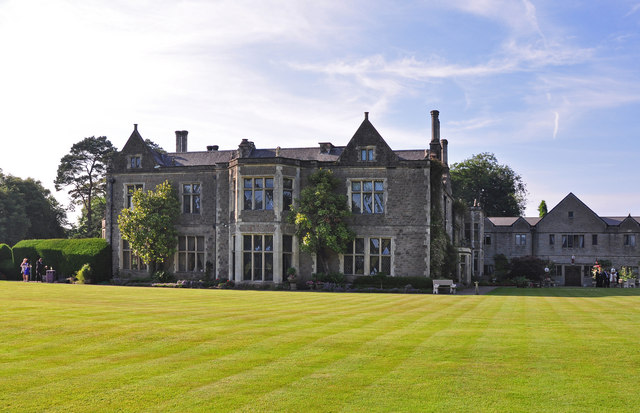
