= Miskin Manor Cricket Club Ground =

Coordinates: 51.51566°N 3.36612°W

Ground information
- Location: Miskin Manor, Glamorgan
- Establishment: 1949

International information
- Only WODI: 9 August 2005: Ireland v Netherlands
- As of 31 August 2020; Source: Ground profile

Miskin Manor Cricket Club Ground is a cricket ground in Miskin Manor, Glamorgan. The first recorded match on the ground was in 1949, when Miskin Manor played Glamorgan Club and Ground.

The ground held a single Women's One Day International during the 2005 Women's European Championship when Ireland women played the Netherlands women.

In local domestic cricket, the ground is the home venue of Miskin Manor Cricket Club.
