= Rutger de Regt =

Rutger de Regt (28 November 1979) born in Zoetermeer is a Dutch designer.

== Biography ==
Rutger de Regt is a furniture design graduate since 2011 at the Royal Academy of Fine Arts in The Hague. This is where he lives and started his design studio. It was also in 2011 when he made his international debut at Ventura Lambrate in Milan with two remarkable collections: The Happy Misfits and the Make&Mold series.

== Work ==
The Happy Misfits concept is based on the process of manipulating the skin by flexible shaping. Make&Mold is a furniture series for which Rutger invented a process to use industrial plastic mold techniques. This chair received a nomination for the Thonet Mart Stam prize, the jury members were Ed Annink, Maarten Baas, Ramin Visch and Harm Tilman. In 2012 Rutger is working on the first prototypes of the Excavate series, elaborating on the technique he developed for the 'Chair for Charity'.

== Projects ==
October 2012 Design Auction : Chair for Charity Rutger de Regt was one of the 14 designers who designed a 'Chair for Charity' for the Venduehuis in The Hague, the Netherlands. The revenue of this chair went to The National MS Foundation, a foundation that fights for people with multiple sclerosis. His chair and many other pieces of among others the designers Maarten Baas, Piet Hein Eek, Marcel Wanders, Ineke Hans and Richard Hutten had been put up for auction. 'Chair for Charity' by Rutger de Regt in collaboration with Marlies van Putten. They studied the way in which the separate parts of the chair connect to form a whole. To achieve this effect, the chair was poured into a mould with flexible polyurethane rubber. The result is a piece of furniture with a structure reminiscent of a honeycomb.

October 2012 Dutch Design Week : Hal2 meets Dutch Design On this occasion, Hal2 Ruimtevormgevers invited Rutger de Regt to present pieces of the Happy Misfits, Make&Mold, Make&Mold Pewter and a series of small stools and tables called Tabouret.

5 December - 10 March 2013 Triennale Design Museum Milan: "KAMA. Sex&Design" The Triennale Design Museum in Milan will present the red Happy Misfits chair of Rutger de Regt in their exhibition "KAMA. Sex & Design". The exhibition investigates the relationship between Eros and design. The exhibition, curated by Silvana Annicchiarico, contains more than 200 objects from historical drawing and archeological finds with mythic roots, to modern furniture and artworks by international artists and designers.
