= Bill Glerum =

Dutch cricketer

Personal information
- Full name: Herman Wilhelm Glerum
- Born: 28 August 1911; Amsterdam, Netherlands
- Died: 24 August 2002 (aged 90); Amsterdam, Netherlands
- Height: 5 ft 9 in (1.75 m)
- Batting: Right-handed
- Bowling: Right-arm off break; Right-arm medium
- Role: All-rounder

International information
- National side: Netherlands

Domestic team information
- Years: Team
- 1957: Free Foresters

Career statistics
Competition	First-class
Matches	1
Runs scored	1
Batting average	0.50
100s/50s	0/0
Top score	1
Balls bowled	66
Wickets	3
Bowling average	10.66
5 wickets in innings	0
10 wickets in match	0
Best bowling	2/16
Catches/stumpings	0/–
- Source: CricketArchive, 17 January 2011

Herman Wilhelm "Bill" Glerum (28 August 1911 – 24 August 2002) was a Dutch cricketer.

An all-rounder, Glerum batted right-handed and bowled right-arm medium as well as off-break. He played one first-class game for the Free Foresters in 1957 against Oxford University. He took 2/16 and 1/16 bowling, and scored one run in the match. He captained VRA Amsterdam and the All Holland XI, and during some years in South America he played for Brazil XI and South America XI.

He died aged 90 in 2002 at Amsterdam.
