= Dutch Twenty20 Cup =

The Dutch Twenty20 Cup is a Twenty20 cricket league in the Netherlands, run by the Koninklijke Nederlandse Cricket Bond (Royal Dutch Cricket Board) since 2007. Currently, the league consists of 16 teams, divided into two divisions of five teams and one division of six teams.

== Teams ==
Club	Location	Home ground	Group
H.V. & C.V. QUICK	The Hague	Sportpark Nieuw Hanenburg	A
HBS	The Hague	Sportpark Craeyenhout	A
VCC	Voorburg	Sportpark Westvliet	A
HCC	The Hague	Sportpark De Diepput	A
SV Kampong Cricket	Utrecht	Sportpark Maarschalkerweerd	A
Excelsior'20	Schiedam	Sportpark Thurlede	B
HERMES D.V.S.	Schiedam	Sportpark Harga	B
VOC	Rotterdam	Schiebroekse Park	B
Sparta Cricket 1888	Capelle aan den IJssel	Sportpark Schollebos	B
Punjab Cricket Club	Rotterdam	Zuiderparkweg	B
VRA	Amstelveen	Sportpark Amsterdamse Bos	C
ACC	Amstelveen	Sportpark 't Loopveld	C
Bloemendaal	Bloemendaal	Sportpark CC Bloemendaal	C
Rood en Wit	Haarlem	Sportpark Spanjaardslaan	C
Dosti CC	Amsterdam	Sportpark Drieburg	C
United Cricket Club	Haarlem	Sportpark United Davo	C

== Dutch Domestic T20 Champions ==
Dutch Domestic T20 Cup Winners (2007–2022)
Year	Winner	Total Titles (After This Win)
2007	Quick Haag	1
2008	HCC	1
2009	Excelsior'20	1
2010	VRA	1
2011	VRA	2
2012	VRA	3
2013	Dosti	1
2014	Dosti	2
2015	VRA	4
2016	ACC	1
2017	ACC	2
2018	HBS	1
2019	VOC	1
2020	VRA	5
2021	VOC	2
2022	VOC	3

== Title Count by Club ==
Club	Titles
VRA	5
VOC	3
Dosti	2
ACC	2
Quick Haag	1
HCC	1
Excelsior'20	1
HBS	1

== Finals ==
24/07/2018 - HBS 139/7 (20 overs) (Barresi 26) beat ACC 108 a.o. (17.3 overs) (Saqib 26, Navjit Singh 4-7) by 21 runs.
