= Sportpark Nieuw Hanenburg =

Cricket ground in The Hague, the Netherlands

Coordinates: 52°04′20.29″N 04°14′39.48″E

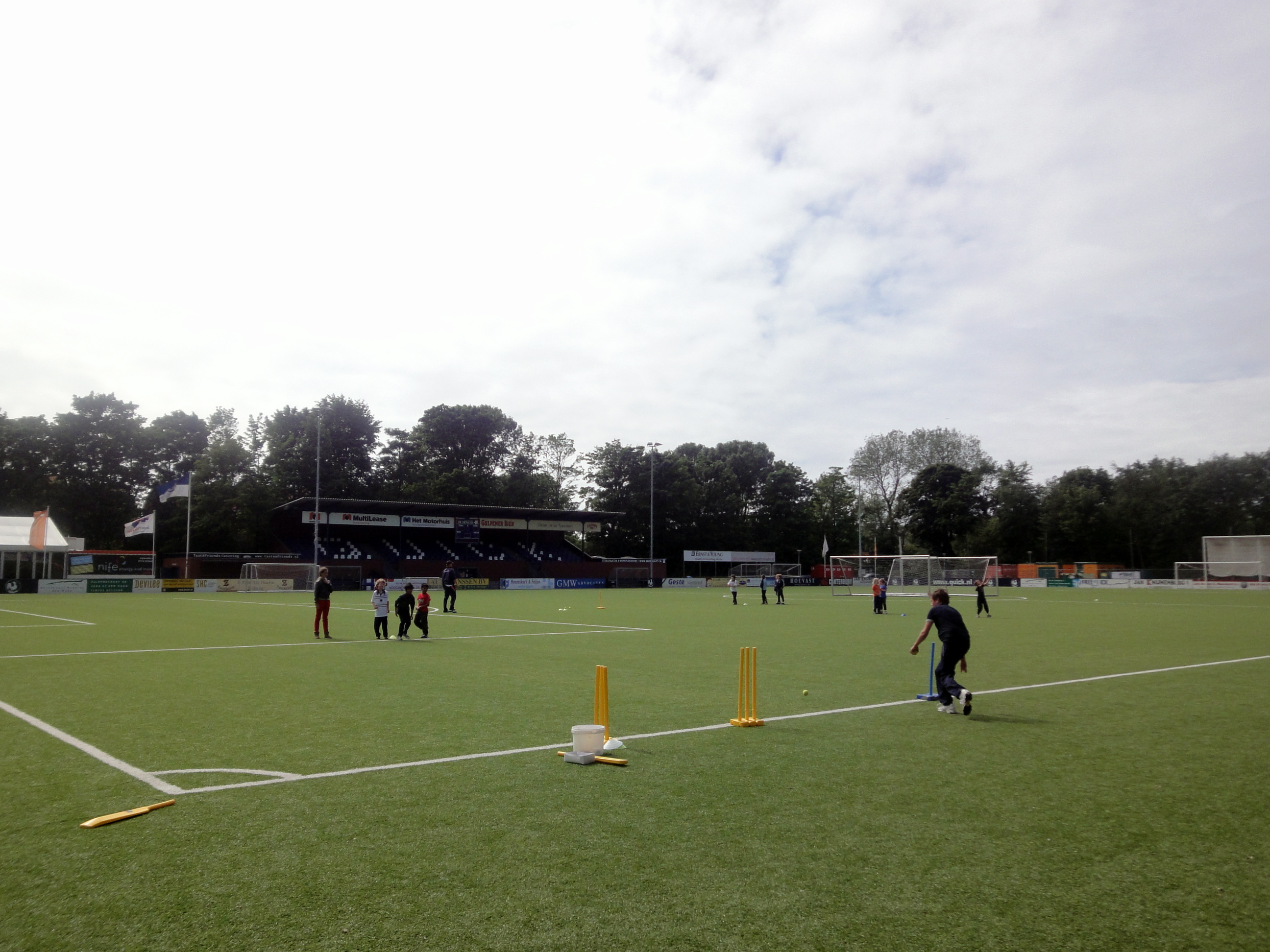

Ground information
- Location: The Hague, Netherlands
- Establishment: 1966 (first recorded match)
- Capacity: Unknown

International information
- Only WODI: 25 July 2003: Netherlands v Ireland
- As of 3 September 2020; Source: Ground profile

Sportpark Nieuw Hanenburg is a cricket ground in The Hague, the Netherlands. The first recorded match on the ground was in 1966 when the Netherlands played Oxford University. Over the next three decades it hosted a number of touring teams, as well as the 1998 European Cricket Championships. The Netherlands Women later played a Women's One Day International there in 2003 against Ireland Women in the IWCC Trophy.

The ground is used by Quick Haag Cricket Club.
