= Sportpark Laag Zestienhoven =

Cricket ground in Rotterdam, Netherlands

Coordinates: 51°56′14.50″N 04°27′19.52″E

Ground information
- Location: Rotterdam, Netherlands
- Establishment: 1963 (first recorded match)
- Capacity: Unknown

International information
- Only WODI: 23 July 2003: Ireland v Pakistan
- As of 20 October 2011; Source: Ground profile

Sportpark Laag Zestienhoven is a cricket ground in Rotterdam, the Netherlands. The first recorded match on the ground came in 1963 when RG Inglese's XI played The Forty Club. The ground later held six matches in the 1990 ICC Trophy. The ground held a single Women's One Day International in 2003 when Ireland Women played Pakistan Women.

The ground is used by VOC Cricket Club.
