= Sportpark Het Loopveld =

Cricket ground in the Netherlands

Coordinates: 52°19′06.61″N 04°53′01.98″E

- Interactive map of Sportpark Het Loopveld

Ground information
- Location: Amstelveen, Netherlands
- Country: Netherlands
- Establishment: 2003 (only recorded match)
- Capacity: Unknown

International information
- Only women's ODI: 21 July 2003: Ireland v West Indies
- As of 3 September 2020; Source: Ground profile

Sportpark Het Loopveld is a cricket ground in Amstelveen, Netherlands. The first and to date only recorded match on the ground came in 2003, when the ground held a Women's One Day International between Ireland Women and the West Indies Women in the IWCC Trophy.

The ground is used by ACC.
