= Sportpark Hofbrouckerlaan =

Cricket ground in Oegstgeest, Netherlands

Coordinates: 52°11′05.95″N 04°29′15.99″E

Ground information
- Location: Oegstgeest, Netherlands
- Country: Netherlands
- Establishment: 2003 (only recorded match)
- Capacity: Unknown

International information
- Only WODI: 21 July 2003: Netherlands v Scotland
- As of 3 September 2020; Source: Ground profile

Sportpark Hofbrouckerlaan is a cricket ground in Oegstgeest, Netherlands. The first and to date only recorded match on the ground came in 2003, when the ground held a Women's One Day International between the Netherlands Women and Scotland Women at the 2003 IWCC Trophy.

The ground is used by Ajax Cricket Club and Leidse Studenten Cricket Club.
