= Sportpark Harga =

Cricket ground

Coordinates: 51°55′21.55″N 04°22′29.51″E

Ground information
- Location: Schiedam, Netherlands
- Establishment: 1968 (first recorded match)
- Capacity: Unknown

International information
- Only WODI: 23 July 2003: Netherlands v Japan
- First WT20I: 28 June 2022: Netherlands v Namibia
- Last WT20I: 30 May 2024: Netherlands v Italy

Team information
Netherlands Women	(2003–Present)
Netherlands	(1990)
- As of 30 May 2024; Source: Ground profile

Sportpark Harga is a cricket ground in Schiedam, Netherlands. The first recorded match on the ground came in 1968 when the Netherlands Under-23s played the Marylebone Cricket Club. The ground hosted various touring international sides in the 1980s, while in 1990 it held seven matches in the ICC Trophy. In 2003, the ground held a Women's One Day International when the Netherlands Women played Japan Women at the IWCC Trophy. In September 2020, a turf ground was installed, giving the facility a total of six pitches, with the aim to host One Day International (ODI) matches in the future.
