= 2003 IWCC Trophy =

- Dates: 21 – 26 July 2003
- Administrator: IWCC
- Cricket format: 50 overs (ODI)
- Tournament format: Round-robin
- Host: Netherlands
- Champions: Ireland (1st title)
- Participants: 6
- Matches: 15
- Player of the series: (Ireland) Barbara McDonald
- Most runs: (Netherlands) Pauline te Beest (317)
- Most wickets: (Pakistan) Sajjida Shah (12)

The 2003 IWCC Trophy was an international women's cricket tournament held in the Netherlands from 21 to 26 July 2003. Organised by the International Women's Cricket Council (IWCC), it was the inaugural edition of what is now the World Cup Qualifier.

The tournament featured six teams and was played using a round-robin format. The top two teams, Ireland and the West Indies, qualified for the 2005 World Cup in South Africa. All matches held One Day International (ODI) status, with Japan making its debut in that format and Scotland playing only its second ODI tournament. Ireland's Barbara McDonald was named the player of the tournament, while the leading runscorer and leading wicket taker, respectively, were Pauline te Beest of the Netherlands and Pakistan's 15-year-old off spinner, Sajjida Shah.

== Background and qualification ==
At all prior editions of the World Cup, participation had been determined by invitation only. The creation of a qualifying tournament, to be known as the IWCC Trophy, was proposed at the 1997 meeting of the IWCC committee in Calcutta, India. It was initially suggested that the inaugural tournament be held in 2002 for the planned 2004 World Cup, but the dates for both the IWCC Trophy and the World Cup were later shifted forward by one year. Six teams participated in the inaugural IWCC Trophy:

- Ireland (7th place at 2000 World Cup)
- Japan (invitee)
- Netherlands (8th place at 2000 World Cup)

- Pakistan (invitee)
- Scotland (invitee)
- West Indies (invitee)

Ireland and the Netherlands qualified for the tournament based on their performance at the 2000 World Cup in New Zealand, where they were the bottom two teams. Of the other four teams, Pakistan and the West Indies had participated at the 1997 World Cup in India, while Scotland (one of the IWCC's newest members) had played in only one prior international tournament, the 2001 European Championship. Japan was making its international debut in women's cricket, with the sport having only popularised among women in the preceding decade.

== Squads ==
Ireland	Japan	Netherlands
Clare Shillington (c); Emma Beamish; Caitriona Beggs; Una Budd; Nicola Coffey; Miriam Grealey; Cecelia Joyce; Isobel Joyce; Anne Linehan; Barbara McDonald; Clare O'Leary; Catherine O'Neill; Heather Whelan; Karen Young	Kaori Kato (c); Aya Fujishiro; Ritsuko Hiroto; Izumi Iimura; Masumi Ishiyama; Maki Kenjo; Michiko Kono; Shizuka Kubota; Ema Kuribayashi; Ayako Miyazaki; Momoko Saito; Eriko Sakata; Yuko Sasaki; Keiko Uchibori	Carolien Salomons (c); Merel de Regt; Jolet Hartenhof; Debbie Kooij; Mandy Kornet; Maartje Köster; Sandra Kottman; Inge Leurs; Marjolijn Molenaar; Helmien Rambaldo; Annemarie Tanke; Pauline te Beest; Eugenie van Leeuwen; Birgit Viguurs
Pakistan	Scotland	West Indies
Shaiza Khan (c); Batool Fatima; Huda Ziad; Khursheed Jabeen; Kiran Baluch; Mariam Butt; Maryam Butt; Nazia Nazir; Sadia Butt; Sajjida Shah; Shabana Latif; Zehmarad Afzal	Kari Anderson (c); Sahar Aslam; Fiona Campbell; Annette Drummond; Aileen Galvin; Shona McIntyre; Sara MacLean; Vari Maxwell; Jenny Mudie; Ali Ramsay; Linda Spence; Caroline Sweetman; Fiona Urquhart; Kathryn White	Stephanie Power (c); Candacy Atkins; Felicia Cummings; Shane de Silva; Verena Felicien; Doris Francis; Nadine George; Indomatie Goordial-John; Debbie-Ann Lewis; Anisa Mohammed; Juliana Nero; Philipa Thomas; Envis Williams; Nelly Williams

== Venues ==
Twelve venues hosted matches at the 2003 IWCC Trophy:
- Sportpark Het Loopveld, Amstelveen – one match
- Sportpark Drieburg, Amsterdam – one match
- Sportpark Hofbrouckerlaan, Oegstgeest – one match
- Sportpark Koninklijke HFC, Haarlem – two matches
- Donkerelaan, Bloemendaal – one match
- Sportpark Laag Zestienhoven, Rotterdam – one match
- Sportpark Harga, Schiedam – one match
- Sportpark Thurlede, Schiedam – one match
- Sportpark Klein Zwitserland, The Hague – one match
- Sportpark Nieuw Hanenburg, The Hague – one match
- Sportpark Duivesteijn, Voorburg – one match
- VRA Ground, Amstelveen – three matches

== Group stage ==
Team	Pld	W	L	T	NR	Pts	NRR
Ireland	5	5	0	0	0	10	+1.718
West Indies	5	4	1	0	0	8	+1.198
Netherlands	5	3	2	0	0	6	+2.127
Pakistan	5	2	3	0	0	4	+0.155
Scotland	5	1	4	0	0	2	–2.042
Japan	5	0	5	0	0	0	–3.637

21 July
Scorecard

Ireland; 84 (44.3 overs)	v	West Indies; 52 (24 overs)

Ireland won by 32 runs
Sportpark Het Loopveld, Amstelveen

- Ireland won the toss and elected to bat.

21 July
Scorecard

Pakistan; 181/6 (50 overs)	v	Japan; 28 (34 overs)

Pakistan won by 153 runs
Sportpark Drieburg, Amsterdam

- Pakistan won the toss and elected to bat.
- Pakistan's Sajjida Shah took 7/4 from her eight overs, setting a record for the best bowling figures in women's ODIs that is yet to be broken. The previous record had been set by England's Jo Chamberlain, who took 7/8 against Denmark in 1991.

21 July
Scorecard

Netherlands; 300/5 (50 overs)	v	Scotland; 81/8 (46 overs)

Netherlands won by 208 runs (D/L)
Sportpark Hofbrouckerlaan, Oegstgeest

- Scotland won the toss and elected to bowl.
- Scotland's target was 290 runs in 46 overs.
- The Dutch total of 300/5 set a new women's ODI record for the Netherlands, although it was broken two days later against Japan.

22 July
Scorecard

Japan; 62 (50 overs)	v	Ireland; 63/1 (9.5 overs)

Ireland won by 9 wickets
Sportpark Koninklijke HFC, Haarlem

- Ireland won the toss and elected to bowl.

22 July
Scorecard

Netherlands; 125/8 (50 overs)	v	West Indies; 126/3 (37.1 overs)

West Indies won by 7 wickets
Sportpark Koninklijke HFC, Haarlem

- West Indies won the toss and elected to bowl.

22 July
Scorecard

Pakistan; 164/9 (50 overs)	v	Scotland; 126 (49.5 overs)

Pakistan won by 38 runs
Donkerelaan, Bloemendaal

- Pakistan won the toss and elected to bat.

23 July
Scorecard

Pakistan; 143/7 (50 overs)	v	Ireland; 144/2 (35.5 overs)

Ireland won by 8 wickets
Sportpark Laag Zestienhoven, Rotterdam

- Pakistan won the toss and elected to bat.

23 July
Scorecard

Netherlands; 375/5 (50 overs)	v	Japan; 74 (43.4 overs)

Netherlands won by 301 runs
Sportpark Harga, Schiedam

- Japan won the toss and elected to bowl.
- The Dutch total of 375/5 set a new women's ODI record for the Netherlands, surpassing the previous mark (300/5) that the Netherlands had set two days earlier against Scotland.

23 July
Scorecard

Scotland; 74 (35.1 overs)	v	West Indies; 75/0 (8.5 overs)

West Indies won by 10 wickets
Sportpark Thurlede, Schiedam

- Scotland won the toss and elected to bat.
- Scotland's first five batters to be dismissed were all run out.

25 July
Scorecard

Scotland; 142 (45.1 overs)	v	Japan; 85 (46.2 overs)

Scotland won by 57 runs
Sportpark Klein Zwitserland, The Hague

- Scotland won the toss and elected to bat.

25 July
Scorecard

Ireland; 156 (49.5 overs)	v	Netherlands; 87/8 (41 overs)

Ireland won by 46 runs (D/L)
Sportpark Nieuw Hanenburg, The Hague

- Netherlands won the toss and elected to bowl.
- The Netherlands' target was 134 runs in 41 overs.

25 July
Scorecard

Pakistan; 93 (50 overs)	v	West Indies; 94/3 (34 overs)

West Indies won by 7 wickets
Sportpark Duivesteijn, Voorburg

- West Indies won the toss and elected to bowl.

26 July
Scorecard

Ireland; 239/5 (50 overs)	v	Scotland; 98 (31.2 overs)

Ireland won by 141 runs
VRA Ground, Amstelveen

- Ireland won the toss and elected to bat.

26 July
Scorecard

Japan; 62 (49.2 overs)	v	West Indies; 63/0 (9 overs)

West Indies won by 10 wickets
VRA Ground, Amstelveen

- Japan won the toss and elected to bat.
- Anisa Mohammed (WI) made her women's One Day International debut.

26 July
Scorecard

Netherlands; 179 (49.1 overs)	v	Pakistan; 107/9 (50 overs)

Netherlands won by 72 runs
VRA Ground, Amstelveen

- Netherlands won the toss and elected to bat.

== Statistics ==
=== Most runs ===
The top five tournament batsmen are included in this table, ordered by runs scored and then by batting average.

Player	Team	Runs	Inns	Avg	Highest	100s	50s
Pauline te Beest	Netherlands	317	5	63.40	142	2	0
Carolien Salomons	Netherlands	140	5	28.00	60	0	1
Debbie Kooij	Netherlands	115	4	28.75	78	0	1
Nadine George	West Indies	114	5	38.00	40	0	0
Miriam Grealey	Ireland	112	4	37.33	61*	0	1

Source: CricketArchive

=== Most wickets ===
The top five tournament bowlers are listed in this table, listed by wickets taken and then by bowling average.

Player	Team	Overs	Wkts	Ave	SR	Econ	BBI
Sajjida Shah	Pakistan	41.0	12	8.00	20.50	2.34	7/4
Barbara McDonald	Ireland	43.0	11	5.54	23.45	1.41	4/13
Catherine O'Neill	Ireland	45.0	11	9.00	24.54	2.20	4/15
Indomatie Goordial-John	West Indies	32.1	8	7.37	24.12	1.83	4/17
Verena Felicien	West Indies	46.3	8	7.62	34.87	1.31	3/8

Source: CricketArchive
