= Netherlands women's cricket team in Pakistan in 2000–01 =

	Pakistan	Netherlands
- Dates: 9 – 21 April 2001
Captains	Shaiza Khan	Pauline te Beest

One Day International series
- Results: Pakistan won the 7-match series 4–3
Most runs	Sajjida Shah (134)	Pauline te Beest (283)
Most wickets	Shaiza Khan (22)	Carolien Salomons (13)

The Netherlands women's national cricket team toured Pakistan in April 2001. They lost the seven-One Day International series to Pakistan 4–3.

== Squads ==
Pakistan	Netherlands
Shaiza Khan (c); Zehmarad Afzal; Kiran Baluch; Batool Fatima; Uzma Gondal (wk); Khursheed Jabeen; Mahewish Khan; Rabia Khan; Sharmeen Khan; Meher Minwalla; Sajjida Shah; Huda Ziad	Pauline te Beest (c) (wk); Jolet Hartenhof; Iris Jharap; Maartje Köster; Marjolijn Molenaar; Cheraldine Oudolf; Caroline Rambaldo; Helmien Rambaldo; Carolien Salomons; Annemarie Tanke; Minou Toussaint (wk); Claudine van de Kieft; Eugenie van Leeuwen; Birgit Viguurs

== WODI Series ==
=== 1st ODI ===
9 April 2001
Scorecard

Netherlands; 156/8 (50 overs)	v	Pakistan; 160/9 (49.2 overs)
Cheraldine Oudolf 21 (36); Shaiza Khan 3/26 (10 overs)		Sajjida Shah 28* (112); Carolien Salomons 3/13 (10 overs)

Pakistan Women won by 1 wicket
National Stadium, Karachi
Umpires: Afzaal Ahmed (Pak) and Shakeel Khan (Pak)
Player of the match: Sajjida Shah (Pak)

- Netherlands Women won the toss and elected to bat.
- Minou Toussaint, Birgit Viguurs (Net), Batool Fatima, Rabia Khan and Huda Ziad (Pak) all made their WODI debuts.

=== 2nd ODI ===
11 April 2001
Scorecard

Netherlands; 160/9 (50 overs)	v	Pakistan; 161/6 (48.3 overs)
Birgit Viguurs 58* (124); Shaiza Khan 5/35 (10 overs)		Kiran Baluch 29 (60); Carolien Salomons 2/23 (9 overs)

Pakistan Women won by 4 wickets
National Stadium, Karachi
Umpires: Junaid Ghafoor (Pak) and Masroor Ali (Pak)
Player of the match: Shaiza Khan (Pak)

- Pakistan Women won the toss and elected to field.
- Marjolijn Molenaar and Claudine van de Kieft (Net) both made their WODI debuts.

=== 3rd ODI ===
12 April 2001
Scorecard

Netherlands; 166 (48.3 overs)	v	Pakistan; 167/8 (49.5 overs)
Maartje Köster 34 (57); Sajjida Shah 4/22 (10 overs)		Shaiza Khan 28 (48); Claudine van de Kieft 2/33 (10 overs)

Pakistan Women won by 2 wickets
National Stadium, Karachi
Umpires: Muzaffar Shah (Pak) and Riazuddin (Pak)
Player of the match: Shaiza Khan (Pak)

- Pakistan Women won the toss and elected to field.

=== 4th ODI ===
14 April 2001
Scorecard

Netherlands; 204/8 (50 overs)	v	Pakistan; 208/5 (47.1 overs)
Carolien Salomons 89 (101); Shaiza Khan 5/38 (10 overs)		Mahewish Khan 69 (72); Jolet Hartenhof 2/51 (9 overs)

Pakistan Women won by 5 wickets
National Stadium, Karachi
Umpires: Riazuddin (Pak) and Sadiq Khan (Pak)
Player of the match: Mahewish Khan (Pak)

- Pakistan Women won the toss and elected to field.

=== 5th ODI ===
16 April 2001
Scorecard

Netherlands; 205/3 (50 overs)	v	Pakistan; 148 (40.5 overs)
Pauline te Beest 80 (121); Khursheed Jabeen 1/30 (10 overs)		Zehmarad Afzal 27 (71); Eugenie van Leeuwen 2/12 (7 overs)

Netherlands Women won by 57 runs
National Stadium, Karachi
Umpires: Javed Qamar (Pak) and Riazuddin (Pak)
Player of the match: Pauline te Beest (Net)

- Pakistan Women won the toss and elected to field.

=== 6th ODI ===
18 April 2001
Scorecard

Pakistan; 156 (49.4 overs)	v	Netherlands; 157/4 (39.5 overs)
Sajjida Shah 22 (85); Pauline te Beest 2/11 (3 overs)		Pauline te Beest 90 (117); Shaiza Khan 2/59 (10 overs)

Netherlands Women won by 6 wickets
National Stadium, Karachi
Umpires: Rashid Khan (Pak) and Tahir Hasan (Pak)
Player of the match: Pauline te Beest (Net)

- Pakistan Women won the toss and elected to bat.

=== 7th ODI ===
21 April 2001
Scorecard

Netherlands; 204/7 (50 overs)	v	Pakistan; 185 (48.5 overs)
Carolien Salomons 79 (85); Khursheed Jabeen 2/40 (10 overs)		Shaiza Khan 38 (62); Carolien Salomons 3/21 (9 overs)

Netherlands Women won by 19 runs
National Stadium, Karachi
Umpires: Atiq Khan (Pak) and Riazuddin (Pak)
Player of the match: Carolien Salomons (Net)

- Pakistan Women won the toss and elected to field.
