= Cricket in Japan =

Cricket is a growing sport in Japan. It was introduced to Japan by the British, with the first match played in 1863 and the first club formed in 1868, both in Yokohama. Until the 1980s, it was played almost exclusively by expatriates. The sport's governing body is the Japan Cricket Association (JCA), which was formed in 1984 and has been a member of the International Cricket Council (ICC) since 1989, initially as an affiliate member and as an associate member since 2005.

== History ==
The first cricket match in Japan was played on 25 June 1863. British merchants at the foreign settlement in Yokohama (a treaty port) challenged sailors on a Royal Navy ship to a game. The invitation was a ploy to ensure that the merchant community would be protected in the case of an ambush from local samurai, as they had been warned of a planned attack on that date. The participants in the match carried revolvers and rifles to ensure their safety, although no attack eventuated. The first cricket club in Japan was the Yokohama Cricket Club, which was formed in 1868 by a Scotsman, James Mollison. For a time, cricket was one of the common sports in Japan's foreign settlements, being played alongside baseball by both American and British expatriates; however, as was taking place in America around the same time, baseball managed to greatly overtake cricket in popularity in Japan by the turn of the 20th century, with first-class cricket's longer playing duration and requirement for a specially prepared playing surface working against it, and American interactions with Japan supporting the rise of baseball as a trans-Pacific pastime.

Throughout most of the 20th century, the only cricket played in Japan was between the expatriate communities in Yokohama and Kobe. However, in the 1980s, cricket was introduced into several universities, by Japanese students who had learnt the game in other countries. The Japan Cricket Association (JCA) was formed in 1984, and became an affiliate member of the International Cricket Council (ICC) in 1989, and an affiliate member of the International Women's Cricket Council (IWCC) in 1995. The first major international tournament for the national men's team was the 1996 ACC Trophy in Malaysia, while the national women's team made its debut at the 2003 IWCC Trophy in the Netherlands. Club cricket in Japan was originally played over two days, with limited-overs league only being established in 1999.

The qualification for the U-19 Cricket World Cup was a major milestone for the country and their first big tournament.

== Venues ==
The headquarters of the Japan Cricket Association (JCA) are in Sano, a city in Tochigi Prefecture, Honshu. The Sano International Cricket Ground is the primary venue for cricket in Japan, and regularly hosts men's and women's international tournaments. In March 2016, plans were announced to bring the ground up to the standards required to host One Day International (ODI) matches, with the installation of floodlights, the construction of a new pavilion. Outside of Sano, the Fujigawa Green Park Cricket Ground in Fuji, Shizuoka Prefecture, hosted the 2004 East Asia-Pacific Cricket Challenge (part of the 2007 World Cup qualifying process), which featured the national teams of Japan, Fiji, Indonesia, and Tonga.

== Demographics ==
Until the 1980s, almost all cricket in Japan was played by foreigners. In July 2016, it was estimated that cricket was played in Japan by 3,000 people across 200 teams.

== Notable players ==
Fourteen women have represented Japan in One Day International (ODI) cricket, all at the 2003 IWCC Trophy. The national men's team is yet to play the format.

At least four male first-class cricketers are known to have been born in Japan, all of whom were of British descent:

- Tom Colverd (born 1996), born in Tokyo, played first-class cricket for Cambridge MCC University
- Frank Gillingham (1875–1953), born in Tokyo, played first-class cricket for Essex
- Greg Kennis (born 1974), born in Yokohama, played first-class cricket for Surrey and Somerset.
- William Maundrell (1876–1958), born in Nagasaki, played first-class cricket for Hampshire

== See also ==
- Japan Cricket Association
- Sano International Cricket Ground
- Japan men's national cricket team
- Japan women's national cricket team
- ICC East Asia-Pacific
- Asian Cricket Council
- 2020 Japan Premier League
