= 2001 Women's European Cricket Championship =

- Dates: 10 – 12 August 2001
- Administrator: European Cricket Council
- Cricket format: ODI (50-over)
- Tournament format: Round-robin
- Host: England
- Champions: Ireland (1st title)
- Participants: 4
- Matches: 6
- Most runs: (England) Laura Harper (93)
- Most wickets: (Ireland) Isobel Joyce (8)

The 2001 Women's European Cricket Championship was an international cricket tournament held in England from 10 to 12 August 2001. It was the sixth edition of the Women's European Championship, and, for the final time, all matches at the tournament held One Day International (ODI) status.

Four teams participated, with the hosts, England, joined by Ireland, the Netherlands, and Scotland. Denmark, which had participated in every prior edition, did not send a team, while Scotland was making both its tournament debut and its ODI debut. England, the winner of the past five editions of the tournament, selected only players under the age of 19 in its squad, although all the team's matches were granted official status. Ireland won all of its round-robin matches to claim its first title. As at the previous tournament in 1999, no final was played, although both England and Ireland were undefeated going into their final match, making that a de facto final. England's Laura Harper and Ireland's Isobel Joyce led the tournament in runs and wickets, respectively. All matches at the tournament were played at Bradfield College, Reading.

== Squads ==
England	Ireland	Netherlands	Scotland
Arran Thompson (c); Sarah Clarke; Leanne Davis; Clare Gough; Isa Guha; Laura Harper; Laura Joyce; Kate Oakenfold; Ebony Rainford-Brent; Nicki Shaw; Laura Spragg; Alexia Walker	Nikki Squire (c); Caitriona Beggs; Aoife Budd; Miriam Grealey; Cecelia Joyce; Isobel Joyce; Grainne Leahy; Anne Linehan; Barbara McDonald; Ciara Metcalfe; Lara Molins; Clare O'Leary; Saibh Young	Carolien Salomons (c); Teuntje de Boer; Caroline Hes; Mandy Kornet; Maartje Köster; Marjolijn Molenaar; Cheraldine Oudolf; Annemarie Tanke; Pauline te Beest; Minou Toussaint; Eugenie van Leeuwen; Carly Verheul; Birgit Viguurs	Linda Spence (c); Kari Anderson; Aileen Galvin; Sara MacLean; Vari Maxwell; Shona McIntyre; Denise Newlove; Pamela Quin; Ali Ramsay; Liz Smith; Caroline Sweetman; Fiona Urquhart; Kathryn White

== Points table ==
Team	Pld	W	L	T	NR	Pts	NRR
Ireland	3	3	0	0	0	6	+1.575
England	3	2	1	0	0	4	+2.266
Netherlands	3	1	2	0	0	2	–1.206
Scotland	3	0	3	0	0	0	–2.599

Source: CricketArchive

== Fixtures ==
10 August
Scorecard

England; 262/7 (50 overs)	v	Scotland; 24 (21.3 overs)

England won by 238 runs
Bradfield College, Reading

- Scotland won the toss and elected to bowl.

10 August
Scorecard

Netherlands; 99/9 (50 overs)	v	Ireland; 100/3 (30 overs)

Ireland won by 7 wickets
Bradfield College, Reading

- Ireland won the toss and elected to bowl.

11 August
Scorecard

Netherlands; 74 (43.2 overs)	v	England; 76/1 (18.2 overs)

England won by 9 wickets
Bradfield College, Reading

- England won the toss and elected to bowl.

11 August
Scorecard

Scotland; 88 (48.4 overs)	v	Ireland; 91/4 (25.1 overs)

Ireland won by 6 wickets
Bradfield College, Reading

- Ireland won the toss and elected to bowl.

12 August
Scorecard

Ireland; 116 (34.1 overs)	v	England; 60 (27 overs)

Ireland won by 56 runs
Bradfield College, Reading

- England won the toss and elected to bowl.
- Ireland's Saibh Young took a hat-trick, becoming the first Irishwoman and fifth woman overall to do so in an ODI.

12 August
Scorecard

Scotland; 123/6 (50 overs)	v	Netherlands; 124/6 (36.2 overs)

Netherlands won by 4 wickets
Bradfield College, Reading

- Netherlands won the toss and elected to bowl.

== Statistics ==
=== Most runs ===
The top five run scorers (total runs) are included in this table.

Player	Team	Runs	Inns	Avg	Highest	100s	50s
Laura Harper	England	93	3	46.50	41	0	0
Pauline te Beest	Netherlands	90	3	45.00	43*	0	0
Caitriona Beggs	Ireland	83	3	41.50	39*	0	0
Sarah Clarke	England	66	2	66.00	66*	0	1
Arran Brindle	England	62	3	31.00	38*	0	0

Source: CricketArchive

=== Most wickets ===
The top five wicket takers are listed in this table, listed by wickets taken and then by bowling average.

Player	Team	Overs	Wkts	Ave	SR	Econ	BBI
Isobel Joyce	Ireland	22.0	8	5.50	16.50	2.00	4/20
Isa Guha	England	20.2	7	3.85	17.42	1.32	3/5
Laura Spragg	England	11.0	5	4.00	13.20	1.81	3/8
Laura Harper	England	14.3	5	9.60	17.40	3.31	4/5
Lara Molins	Ireland	13.0	4	3.75	19.50	1.15	2/5

Source: CricketArchive
