= List of Scotland women ODI cricketers =

Overall, seventeen players have represented the Scottish national women's cricket team in One Day International (ODI) cricket. Scotland made its ODI debut at the 2001 edition of the European Championship, becoming the sixteenth team to appear at that level. The team also played ODIs at the 2003 IWCC Trophy (now called the World Cup Qualifier), but at its next major international tournament, the 2005 European Championship, Scotland lost its ODI status, which it is yet to regain. In total, Scotland played eight ODI matches between 2001 and 2003, winning only a single match – against Japan in 2003.

In May 2022, the ICC announced Scotland as one of five women's sides to gain ODI status.

== Key ==
General

- ‡ – Captain
- † – Wicket-keeper
- First – Year of debut
- Last – Year of latest game
- Mat – Number of matches played

Batting

- Runs – Runs scored in career
- HS – Highest score
- Avg – Runs scored per dismissal
- * – Batsman remained not out

Bowling

- Wkt – Wickets taken in career
- BBI – Best bowling in an innings
- Ave – Average runs per wicket

Fielding

- Ca – Catches taken
- St – Stumpings affected

== List of players ==
Last updated 30 August 2026. This list includes all players who have played at least one ODI match and is initially arranged in the order of debut appearance. Where more than one player won their first cap in the same match, those players are initially listed alphabetically at the time of debut.

Scotland WODI cricketers
| General | | | | | Batting | | | | | Bowling | | | | Fielding | | Ref |
| No. | Name | First | Last | Mat | Runs | HS | Avg | 50 | 100 | Balls | Wkt | BBI | Ave | Ca | St | Ref |
|---|---|---|---|---|---|---|---|---|---|---|---|---|---|---|---|---|
| 1 | Kari Anderson‡ | 2001 | 2003 | 8 | 133 | 46 | 16.62 | 0 | 0 | 324 | 8 | 3/64 | 21.75 | 4 | 0 | |
| 2 | Aileen Galvin† | 2001 | 2003 | 6 | 4 | 3* | 1.00 | 0 | 0 | – | – | – | – | 1 | 0 | |
| 3 | Sara MacLean | 2001 | 2003 | 6 | 67 | 23 | 11.16 | 0 | 0 | 104 | 3 | 2/39 | 24.33 | 0 | 0 | |
| 4 | Vari Maxwell | 2001 | 2003 | 7 | 45 | 15 | 6.42 | 0 | 0 | 234 | 7 | 4/38 | 23.71 | 4 | 0 | |
| 5 | Denise Newlove | 2001 | 2001 | 3 | 1 | 1* | 1.00 | 0 | 0 | – | – | – | – | 0 | 0 | |
| 6 | Ali Ramsay† | 2001 | 2003 | 7 | 59 | 26 | 9.83 | 0 | 0 | 48 | 1 | 1/10 | 53.00 | 1 | 0 | |
| 7 | Liz Smith | 2001 | 2001 | 3 | 0 | 0 | 0.00 | 0 | 0 | – | – | – | – | 0 | 0 | |
| 8 | Linda Spence‡ | 2001 | 2003 | 6 | 78 | 23 | 13.00 | 0 | 0 | 61 | 3 | 2/29 | 21.00 | 2 | 0 | |
| 9 | Caroline Sweetman | 2001 | 2003 | 4 | 4 | 4 | 1.33 | 0 | 0 | – | – | – | – | 2 | 0 | |
| 10 | Fiona Urquhart | 2001 | 2003 | 8 | 41 | 16 | 5.85 | 0 | 0 | 269 | 4 | 2/19 | 54.00 | 0 | 0 | |
| 11 | Kathryn White | 2001 | 2003 | 8 | 84 | 23 | 10.50 | 0 | 0 | 420 | 5 | 2/28 | 44.00 | 1 | 0 | |
| 12 | Shona McIntyre | 2001 | 2003 | 6 | 28 | 11* | 7.00 | 0 | 0 | 194 | 3 | 2/15 | 42.33 | 0 | 0 | |
| 13 | Pamela Quin | 2001 | 2001 | 1 | – | – | – | – | – | – | – | – | – | 0 | 0 | |
| 14 | Fiona Campbell | 2003 | 2003 | 4 | 5 | 3 | 1.66 | 0 | 0 | 102 | 5 | 4/25 | 13.60 | 1 | 0 | |
| 15 | Annette Drummond | 2003 | 2003 | 5 | 9 | 6 | 1.80 | 0 | 0 | – | – | – | – | 1 | 0 | |
| 16 | Jenny Mudie | 2003 | 2003 | 3 | 0 | 0* | 0.00 | 0 | 0 | 126 | 2 | 1/13 | 49.00 | 0 | 0 | |
| 17 | Sahar Aslam | 2003 | 2003 | 3 | 0 | 0 | 0.00 | 0 | 0 | 0 | – | – | – | 0 | 0 | |
| 18 | Olivia Bell | 2023 | 2024 | 6 | 32 | 15* | 10.66 | 0 | 0 | 288 | 3 | 1/15 | 53.33 | 1 | 0 | |
| 19 | Kathryn Bryce‡ | 2023 | 2025 | 10 | 594 | 131* | 66.00 | 6 | 1 | 360 | 11 | 3/49 | 26.72 | 2 | 0 | |
| 20 | Sarah Bryce† | 2023 | 2026 | 11 | 368 | 84 | 36.80 | 3 | 0 | – | – | – | – | 15 | 5 | |
| 21 | Darcey Carter | 2023 | 2026 | 12 | 262 | 86 | 23.81 | 1 | 0 | 484 | 11 | 3/20 | 31.63 | 5 | 0 | |
| 22 | Priyanaz Chatterji | 2023 | 2025 | 14 | 236 | 61 | 16.85 | 1 | 0 | 473 | 8 | 2/19 | 51.62 | 5 | 0 | |
| 23 | Lorna Jack-Brown | 2023 | 2024 | 8 | 113 | 35* | 16.14 | 0 | 0 | – | – | – | – | 0 | 0 | |
| 24 | Ailsa Lister | 2023 | 2025 | 9 | 213 | 47 | 23.66 | 0 | 0 | – | – | – | – | 6 | 0 | |
| 25 | Abtaha Maqsood‡ | 2023 | 2026 | 15 | 39 | 19 | 5.57 | 0 | 0 | 686 | 28 | 4/30 | 18.00 | 4 | 0 | |
| 26 | Megan McColl | 2023 | 2026 | 13 | 242 | 57 | 20.16 | 1 | 0 | 54 | 0 | – | – | 1 | 0 | |
| 27 | Hannah Rainey | 2023 | 2025 | 6 | 22 | 8* | 5.50 | 0 | 0 | 194 | 10 | 5/41 | 19.10 | 1 | 0 | |
| 28 | Ellen Watson | 2023 | 2026 | 10 | 55 | 16 | 6.87 | 0 | 0 | – | – | – | – | 1 | 3 | |
| 29 | Maryam Faisal | 2023 | 2026 | 4 | 53 | 26 | 13.25 | 0 | 0 | – | – | – | – | 0 | 0 | |
| 30 | Nayma Sheikh | 2023 | 2024 | 2 | 10 | 10 | 10.00 | 0 | 0 | 60 | 1 | 1/8 | 25.00 | 0 | 0 | |
| 31 | Katherine Fraser | 2024 | 2026 | 11 | 229 | 74* | 28.62 | 1 | 0 | 552 | 18 | 3/28 | 20.66 | 7 | 0 | |
| 32 | Saskia Horley | 2024 | 2024 | 5 | 276 | 100 | 69.00 | 2 | 1 | 132 | 9 | 4/24 | 8.88 | 1 | 0 | |
| 33 | Rachel Slater | 2024 | 2025 | 5 | 90 | 61* | 90.00 | 1 | 0 | 184 | 7 | 3/9 | 19.42 | 0 | 0 | |
| 34 | Chloe Abel | 2024 | 2025 | 9 | 18 | 9 | 3.60 | 0 | 0 | 342 | 12 | 2/20 | 21.16 | 2 | 0 | |
| 35 | Abbi Aitken-Drummond | 2024 | 2025 | 8 | 78 | 22 | 9.75 | 0 | 0 | – | – | – | – | 1 | 0 | |
| 36 | Gabriella Fontenla | 2024 | 2026 | 4 | 11 | 10* | 11.00 | 0 | 0 | 151 | 2 | 1/18 | 69.00 | 1 | 0 | |
| 37 | Pippa Sproul | 2025 | 2026 | 6 | 107 | 79 | 21.40 | 1 | 0 | – | – | – | – | 0 | 0 | |
| 38 | Maisie Maceira | 2026 | 2026 | 2 | 3 | 3 | 3.00 | 0 | 0 | 78 | 1 | 1/37 | 76.00 | 1 | 0 | |
| 39 | Rebecca McCrossan | 2026 | 2026 | 2 | 5 | 5 | 5.00 | 0 | 0 | – | – | – | – | 0 | 0 | |
| 40 | Niamh Robertson-Jack | 2026 | 2026 | 1 | 0 | 0 | 0.00 | 0 | 0 | 60 | 0 | – | – | 0 | 0 | |
| 41 | Ammy Baldie | 2026 | 2026 | 1 | – | – | – | – | – | 36 | 0 | – | – | 1 | 0 | |

== See also ==
- List of Scotland women Twenty20 International cricketers
