= Budd (surname) =

Budd is an English surname. Notable people with the surname include:

- Alan Budd (born 1937), British economist
- Aoife Budd (born 1980), Irish cricketer
- Barbara Budd (born 1953), Canadian actress
- Brian Budd (born 1952), Canadian professional soccer player
- Bryan Budd (1977–2006), British soldier posthumously awarded the Victoria Cross
- Christopher Budd (mathematician) (born 1960), British mathematician
- Christopher Budd (cricketer) (born 1978), English cricketer
- Christopher Budd (bishop) (born 1937), British Roman Catholic prelate
- Colin Budd (born 1945), British civil servant and diplomat
- Dave Budd (born 1938), American basketball player
- Edward G. Budd (1870–1946), American inventor and businessman
- Eric Budd (1924–2006), English cricket administrator
- Frank Budd (born 1939), American football player
- Gardner Budd (1904–1976), Irish judge and senator
- Grace Budd (died 1928), American murder victim
- Harold Budd (1936–2020), American ambient/avant-garde composer
- Herbert Ashwin Budd (1881–1950), British painter
- James Budd (1851–1908), American lawyer and Democratic politician
- Jo Budd (born 1961), British textile artist
- Louis J. Budd (1921–2010), American literary critic and historian
- Nellie Moyer Budd (1860–1944), American music teacher
- Ralph Budd (1879–1962), American railroad executive
- Rick Budd (1920–1988), American politician from Nebraska
- Ruth Budd (1924–2021), Canadian bassist and member of the Symphony Six
- Roy Budd (1947–93), British jazz musician and film composer
- Sibylla Budd (born before 1999), Australian actress
- Ted Budd (born 1971), American politician
- Wayne Budd (born 1941), American executive and attorney
- Una Budd (born 1975), Irish cricketer
- Zola Budd (born 1966), South African-born British track and field athlete who competed in the Summer Olympic Games

Fictional characters

- Title character of Herman Melville's novella Billy Budd, first published 1924
- David Budd, main character of Bodyguard (UK TV series)
