= Sara MacLean =

English-born Scottish cricketer

Sara Maclean
Personal information
- Full name: Sara Jeanne Maclean
- Born: 25 September 1963 (age 63); Clapham, London, England
- Batting: Right-handed
- Bowling: Right-arm

International information
- National side: Scotland (2000–2003)
- ODI debut (cap 3): 10 August 2001 v England
- Last ODI: 25 July 2003 v Japan

Domestic team information
- Years: Team
- 1998: Northumberland

Career statistics
| Competition | WODI |
|---|---|
| Matches | 6 |
| Runs scored | 67 |
| Batting average | 11.16 |
| 100s/50s | 0/0 |
| Top score | 23 |
| Balls bowled | 104 |
| Wickets | 3 |
| Bowling average | 24.33 |
| 5 wickets in innings | 0 |
| 10 wickets in match | 0 |
| Best bowling | 2/39 |
| Catches/stumpings | 0/– |
- Source: Cricinfo, 19 November 2015

Sara Jeanne Maclean (born 25 September 1963) is a former Scottish international cricketer whose career for the Scottish national side spanned from 2000 to 2003.

Maclean was born in England rather than Scotland, in Clapham, London. She made her debut for Scotland in June 2000, in a friendly match against Northumberland. Before a separate Scottish team began to compete, she and another future international, Linda Spence, had played for Northumberland for a brief period, it being one of the closest English counties to Scotland.

In 2001, Maclean was selected in the Scottish squad for the 2001 European Championship, where matches held One Day International (ODI) status. The tournament was Scotland's first at ODI level, and Maclean played in all three of her team's matches, against England, Ireland, and the Netherlands. On debut against England, she topscored with eight runs from 71 balls (out of a team total of only 24 runs), and took 2/39 from her ten overs. The third-oldest member of the squad (after Liz Smith and Pamela Quin), McLean was 37 years and 319 days old on her debut, becoming the ninth-oldest ODI debutant for any team.

The next international tournament for Scotland was the 2003 IWCC Trophy in the Netherlands, which served as a qualifier for the 2005 World Cup. Maclean played in only three of her team's five matches at the event, against Pakistan, the West Indies, and Japan. In her final match, against Japan, she made her highest ODI score, 23 runs from fifth in the batting order. In that match, which was her final international appearance, she was almost 40 years old – only Liz Smith has appeared in an ODI for Scotland at an older age. Maclean had balanced the final years of her playing career for Scotland with a position as marketing and communications manager for Cricket Scotland.
