= Aileen Galvin =

Personal information
- Full name: Aileen Martina Galvin
- Born: 22 July 1968 (age 58); Dublin, Ireland
- Batting: Right-handed
- Role: Wicket-keeper

International information
- National side: Scotland (2000–2006)
- ODI debut (cap 2): 10 August 2001 v England
- Last ODI: 23 July 2003 v West Indies

Career statistics
Competition	ODI
Matches	6
Runs scored	4
Batting average	1.00
100s/50s	0/0
Top score	3*
Catches/stumpings	1/0
- Source: Cricinfo, 15 July 2015

Aileen Martina Galvin (born 22 July 1968) is a former Scottish international cricketer whose career for the Scottish national side spanned from 2000 to 2006.

Galvin was born in Dublin, Ireland, but played all of her international cricket for Scotland. She made her debut for the team in June 2000, against Cumbria (an English county team). The following year, Galvin was selected in the Scottish squad for the 2001 European Championship, where matches held One Day International (ODI) status. The tournament was Scotland's first at ODI level, and Galvin played as wicket-keeper in all three of her team's matches, against England, Ireland, and the Netherlands.

The next international tournament for Scotland was the 2003 IWCC Trophy in the Netherlands, which served as a qualifier for the 2005 World Cup. Galvin played in first three matches of the tournament, against the Netherlands, Pakistan, and the West Indies, but for the final two matches (against Japan and Ireland) was replaced as wicket-keeper by Ali Ramsay. She continued to make sporadic appearances for Scotland over the next few years, including at the 2005 European Championship. Her final recorded match coming against Durham in May 2006, aged 37. Unusually for a modern-day wicket-keeper, Galvin regularly came in last in the batting order, batting eleventh in four out of her six ODIs. Her five ODI innings yielded only four runs in total, and including three ducks.
