= Kaori Kato =

Japanese cricketer

Personal information
- Full name: Kaori Kato
- Born: 26 July 1977 (age 49); Japan
- Batting: Right-handed
- Bowling: Right-arm medium-fast
- Role: All-rounder

International information
- National side: Japan
- ODI debut (cap 4): 21 July 2003 v Pakistan
- Last ODI: July 26 2003 v West Indies

Career statistics
Competition	WODI
Matches	5
Runs scored	16
Batting average	8.00
100s/50s	0/0
Top score	8*
Balls bowled	239
Wickets	5
Bowling average	32.00
5 wickets in innings	0
10 wickets in match	0
Best bowling	2/23
Catches/stumpings	0/0
- Source: ESPNcricinfo, 25 September 2011

Kaori Kato (born 26 July 1977) is a Japanese former cricketer who played five Women's One Day International matches for the Japan national women's cricket team in 2003. She captained the side during the 2003 IWCC Trophy, which served as a qualification competition for the 2005 World Cup.
