= Uchibori =

Uchibori is a Japanese surname. Notable people with the surname include:

- Katsuji Uchibori (fl. 1997–2015), Japanese curler
- Keiko Uchibori (born 1976), Japanese cricketer
- Masao Uchibori (born 1964), Japanese politician
