= Iimura =

Iimura (written: 飯村) is a Japanese surname. Notable people with the surname include:

- Izumi Iimura (born 1980), Japanese women's cricketer
- Jo Iimura (飯村 穣; 1888–1976), Japanese general
- Rikiya Iimura, Japanese karateka
- Iimura Takahiko (飯村 隆彦; 1937–2022), Japanese film director
