= Debbie Kooij =

Dutch cricketer (born 1968)

Personal information
- Born: 27 December 1968 (age 57); Nijmegen, Netherlands
- Batting: Right-handed
- Role: Batsman

International information
- National side: Netherlands (1999–2003)
- ODI debut (cap 53): 19 July 1999 v England
- Last ODI: 26 July 2003 v Pakistan

Career statistics
Competition	WODI
Matches	7
Runs scored	123
Batting average	17.57
100s/50s	0/1
Top score	78
Catches/stumpings	2/–
- Source: CricketArchive, 18 October 2015

Debbie Kooij (born 27 December 1968) is a former Dutch cricketer whose international career for the Dutch national side spanned from 1999 to 2003. A right-handed batsman, she played in seven One Day International (ODI) matches.

Born in Nijmegen, Kooij made her ODI debut aged 21, appearing in three matches at the 1999 edition of the European Championship in Denmark. She scored a duck on debut against England, and also performed poorly in her two other matches, scoring five runs against Ireland and three against Denmark. Kooij did not play another international until 2003, when she was selected in the Dutch squad for the 2003 IWCC Trophy (the qualifier for the 2005 World Cup). At that tournament, she scored 115 runs from her four matches, placing her behind only Pauline te Beest and Carolien Salomons both for the Netherlands and for overall runs. Kooij's best innings, 78 from 138 balls, came in the opening match against Scotland, where she opened the batting with Eugenie van Leeuwen. Her innings included a 224-run stand with Pauline te Beest, which set a new record for the highest second-wicket partnership in ODIs (broken in 2009), and at the time was also the third-highest partnership overall (for any wicket). The IWCC Trophy was Kooij's final tournament for the Netherlands, with her last ODI coming in the final match, against Pakistan.
