= Merel de Regt =

Dutch cricketer (born 1981)

Personal information
- Full name: Merel A de Regt
- Born: 14 December 1981 (age 44) s-Gravenhage, The Hague, Netherlands
- Role: Wicket-keeper

International information
- National side: Netherlands (2003)
- ODI debut (cap 63): 21 July 2003 v Scotland
- Last ODI: 25 July 2003 v Ireland

Career statistics
Competition	WODI
Matches	3
Runs scored	6
Batting average	6.00
100s/50s	0/0
Top score	6
Catches/stumpings	4/2
- Source: ESPNcricinfo, 20 November 2017

Merel A de Regt (born 14 December 1981) is a Dutch former cricketer who played as a wicket-keeper. She appeared for Netherlands in three One Day Internationals, all at the 2003 IWCC Trophy in her home country. The tournament was the inaugural edition of what is now the Women's Cricket World Cup Qualifier. She scored six runs, took four catches and made two stumpings as her side won three of their five matches but failed to qualify.
