= Denise Newlove =

New Zealand-born Scottish cricketer

Personal information
- Full name: Denise Marie Newlove
- Born: 2 February 1968 (age 58); Pātea, New Zealand
- Batting: Right-handed
- Role: Batsman

International information
- National side: Scotland (2000–2001)
- ODI debut (cap 5): 10 August 2001 v England
- Last ODI: 12 August 2001 v Netherlands

Career statistics
| Competition | ODI |
|---|---|
| Matches | 3 |
| Runs scored | 1 |
| Batting average | 1.00 |
| 100s/50s | 0/0 |
| Top score | 1* |
| Catches/stumpings | 0/0 |
- Source: Cricinfo, 22 November 2015

Denise Marie Newlove (born 2 February 1973) is a former Scottish international cricketer. Born in Pātea, a small town in the Taranaki region of New Zealand, she debuted for the Scottish national side in June 2000. Newlove's One Day International (ODI) debut came the following year, at the 2001 European Championship. The tournament was Scotland's first at ODI level, and Newlove played in all three of her team's matches, against England, Ireland, and the Netherlands. She scored only a single runs from three innings, in what were her only international appearances.
