= The High School, Dublin =

Private secondary school in Dublin, Ireland

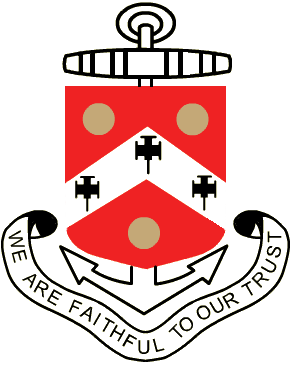

Location
- Zion Road, Rathgar; Dublin, County Dublin, D06YR68; Ireland; 53.305872°N 6.272937°W

Information
- Type: Private secondary school
- Motto: We are faithful to our trust
- Religious affiliation: Church of Ireland
- Established: 1870; 156 years ago
- Oversight: The Erasmus Smith Trust
- Principal: V Connolly (Acting)
- Website: www.highschooldublin.com

The High School, Dublin is a 12–18 co-educational, Church of Ireland, private secondary school in Rathgar, Dublin, Ireland.

It was established in 1870 at Harcourt Street before moving to Rathgar in 1971. It amalgamated with The Diocesan School for Girls in 1974, becoming co-educational. The school offers a range of sports including badminton, cricket, cross country, hockey, rugby and tennis, and extracurricular activities including model United Nations, junior and senior debating, chess, LEGO and robotics, choir and orchestra, junior and senior drama, radio, film, literary and poetry societies and student government. In 2009, it was noted as the school with the highest rate of progression to third-level education. It is owned and overseen by the Erasmus Smith Trust.

== Buildings ==
The school hosts the W. B. Yeats Library, named for the former pupil, and the Reynolds Hall gathering centre, named for former principal Ralph Reynolds. The modern site in Rathgar was built on the Danum estate, purchased by Ernest Bewley of the Bewley family in 1904. The site has an all weather rugby pitch, two full size hockey pitches, six basketball courts, an apiary, a croquet lawn and land suitable for tennis, athletics, badminton and shotput. The all weather pitch was a donation from former pupil Denis O'Brien.

The new school building in Rathgar on the Bewley estate was formally opened on the 26th of November, 1971, by then Taoiseach Jack Lynch and dedicated by Reverend Alan Buchanan. The schools's Technical and Crafts Building ("T Block"), Pavilion, Music Centre ("M Block") and the Archive of the Erasmus Smith Trust were opened on the 26th of April 2002 by former Taoiseach Garret Fitzgerald. Plaques in the school offices commemorate both events. In 2021 the school constructed Prefabs ("P Block") at the back of the building. The school has three storeys, known as the A Floor, B Floor and C Floor respectively. Inside the building the school hosts multiple large student murals, a Demonstration Theatre, a large gymasium and sports centre, a canteen, student and staff common rooms, a photography dark room, a sensory room, two art studios, two woodworking labs, six science labs, four official meeting rooms and an infirmary. Two computer labs were replaced with classrooms in 2024.

== Zion Parish ==
The High School has strong ties with Zion Parish, where school services are hosted at Easter and Christmas. Annual parish fêtes from both Zion and Rathfarnham Parish are held on school grounds.

== Feeder schools ==
The High School's primary feeder schools include Zion Parish N.S., as well as Rathfarnham Parish N.S., Booterstown N.S., Rathmichael N.S., Taney, Monkstown, Dalkey and others. The High School itself is a feeder school to many third-level education institutions in both Ireland and the United Kingdom.

== Yearbook ==
The school's yearbook, The Erasmian and Dioscean Times, is an annual publication that has been in operation since 1899. It is named to honor both the roots of the High School with Erasmus Smith and the incorporated girls' school, The Diocesan School for Girls. The 1937 edition marked the first public publication of the poem 'What Then?' by former pupil W.B. Yeats. In the 1916 edition students published an opinion piece on the Easter Rising, which they described as "inconvenient" when trying to travel to school.

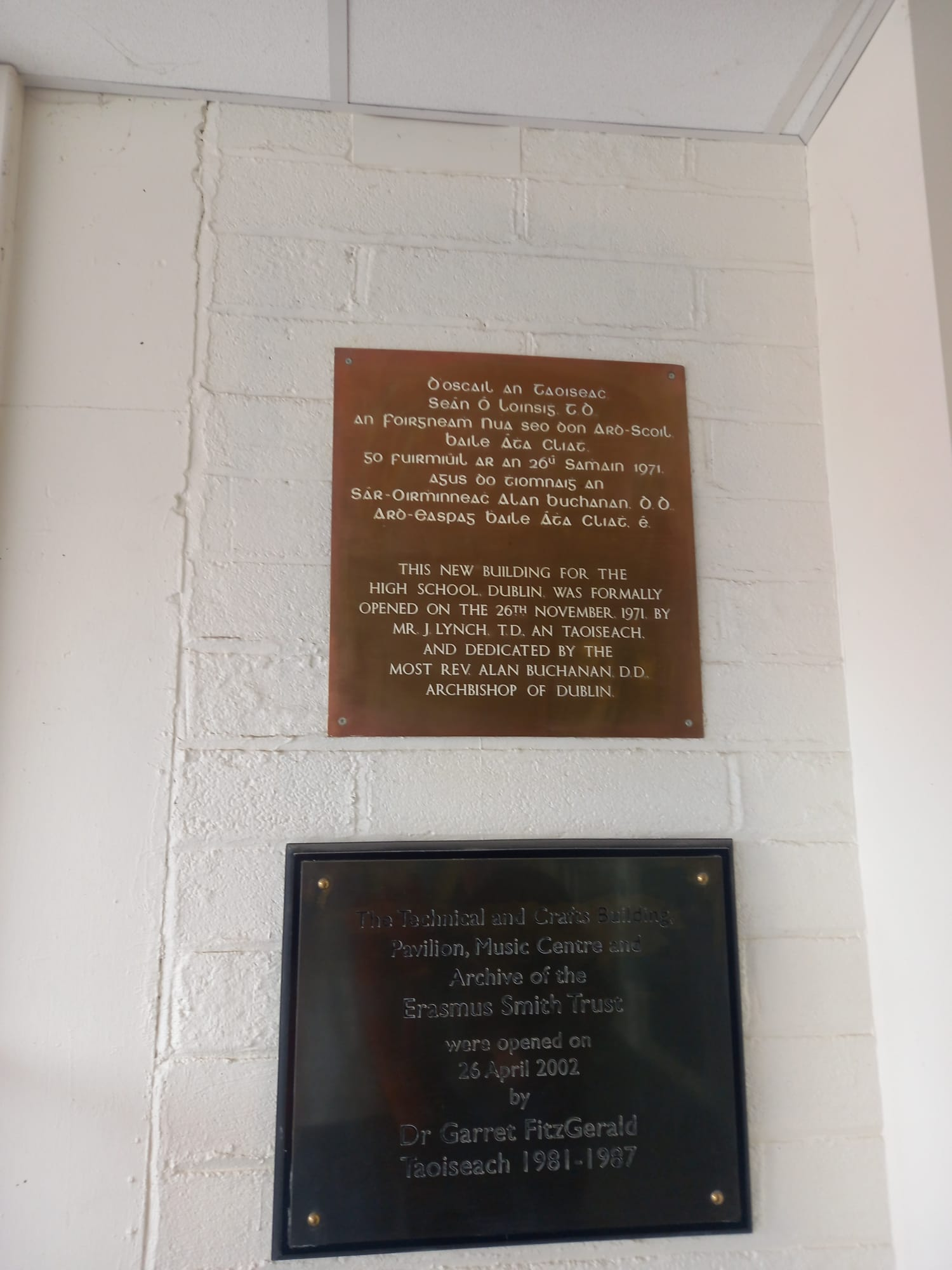
Plaques in the A Floor Reception detailing the openings of the Reynolds Hall, TecBlock, Music Block and Erasmus Smith Archive

== Notable former pupils ==
- Lenny Abrahamson, film director and screenwriter
- Ernest Alton, university professor, independent Teachta Dála and Senator
- Nicola Daly, hockey player
- Charles D'Arcy, bishop
- John Duggan, bishop
- Jonathan Garth, cricketer
- C. G. Grey, editor and writer
- A. Norman Jeffares, literary critic and academic
- Howard Kilroy, accountant and businessman
- F. S. L. Lyons, historian and academic
- William Kirkpatrick Magee, author, editor, and librarian
- Brian McCracken, judge
- Roly Meates, former Ireland national rugby union team coach
- Alison Meeke, hockey player
- Robert William D'Estcourt Ashe, assassinated colonial government official in South India. A plaque in the building commemorates his death.
- Greg Molins, cricketer
- Jason Molins, cricketer
- J. Alec Motyer, biblical scholar
- Annalise Murphy, sailor
- William Noblett, priest and author
- David Norris, scholar, independent Senator and civil rights activist
- Denis O'Brien, businessman
- Shane O'Donoghue, field hockey player
- Caoimhín Ó Raghallaigh, fiddler
- Philip Orr BIL, rugby union player
- John Robbie BIL, rugby union player
- Trevor Sargent, politician and priest
- Alan Shatter, politician
- Roland Shortt, cricketer
- John Thorpe, priest
- William Thrift, university professor and independent Teachta Dála
- Jack Butler Yeats, artist and Olympic medallist
- William Butler Yeats, poet and dramatist

== See also ==
- Pearse Street, Dublin
