= Roland Shortt =

Irish cricketer

Personal information
- Full name: Roland Henry Shortt
- Born: 7 August 1898; Dublin, Ireland
- Died: 8 August 1963 (aged 65); Dublin, Leinster, Ireland
- Batting: Right-handed
- Bowling: Right-arm medium

Domestic team information
- Years: Team
- 1934: Ireland

Career statistics
Competition	First-class
Matches	1
Runs scored	0
Batting average	0.00
100s/50s	–/–
Top score	0
Balls bowled	156
Wickets	3
Bowling average	22.00
5 wickets in innings	–
10 wickets in match	–
Best bowling	3/22
Catches/stumpings	–/–
- Source: Cricinfo, 2 November 2018

Roland Henry Shortt (7 August 1898 – 8 August 1963) was an Irish first-class cricketer.

Shortt was born at Dublin in August 1898, where he was educated in the city at The High School, Dublin. Shortt first played club cricket in Dublin for Merrion Cricket Club, before leaving to play for Pembroke in 1922. Shortt later made a single appearance in first-class cricket for Ireland against the Marylebone Cricket Club (MCC) at Dublin in 1934. Batting twice in the match, Shortt was dismissed without scoring in Ireland's first-innings by Denijs Morkel, while in their second-innings he was once again dismissed without scoring, this time by Reginald Butterworth. He bowled 18 wicket-less overs for 44 runs in the MCC first-innings, while in their second-innings he dismissed Morkel, Brian Belle and Erroll Tremlett, finishing with figures of 3 for 22 from 8 overs. He did not appear for Ireland after this match, but did continue to play club cricket for Pembroke until 1949, after which he joined YMCA. Outside of cricket, he worked as a dentist. He died at Dublin in August 1963, the day after his 65th birthday.
