= Mark Bott =

English cricketer

Personal information
- Full name: Mark Daniel Bott
- Born: 13 May 1986 (age 40); Nottingham, Nottinghamshire, England
- Batting: Right-handed

Domestic team information
- Years: Team
- 2009: Bedfordshire
- 2007: Cambridgeshire
- 2009–2009: Cambridge University

Career statistics
Competition	First-class
Matches	7
Runs scored	84
Batting average	8.40
100s/50s	–
Top score	27
Balls bowled	–
Wickets	–
Bowling average	–
5 wickets in innings	–
10 wickets in match	–
Best bowling	–
Catches/stumpings	9/–
- Source: Cricinfo, 28 May 2011

Mark Daniel Bott (born 13 May 1986) is an English first-class cricketer. He was born in Nottingham, England and is Jewish.

== Playing career ==
His batting style is right-hand bat. Among other teams, he has played for Cambridge University Centre of Cricketing Excellence (Main FC: 2006–09); Bedfordshire County Cricket Club (Minor Counties Championship: 2009); Cambridgeshire County Cricket Club (Minor Counties Trophy: 2007); and Bedfordshire (Minor Counties Trophy: 2009).

In 2008, Bott was named along with Jason Molins and Darren Gerard to the Maccabi GB cricket team to represent the United Kingdom at the 2009 Maccabiah Games.

He won a silver medal with Great Britain at the 2017 Maccabiah Games.

== See also ==
- List of select Jewish cricketers
