= Huda Ziad =

Pakistani cricketer (born 1983)

Personal information
- Full name: Huda Ziad
- Born: 6 May 1983 (age 43); Karachi, Pakistan
- Batting: Right-handed
- Bowling: Right-arm leg break
- Role: Batter

International information
- National side: Pakistan (2001–2003)
- ODI debut (cap 28): 9 April 2001 v Netherlands
- Last ODI: 23 July 2003 v Ireland

Career statistics
Competition	WODI
Matches	15
Runs scored	4
Batting average	0.80
100s/50s	0/0
Top score	2*
Catches/stumpings	0/–
- Source: CricketArchive, 8 January 2022

Huda Ziad (born 6 May 1983) is a Pakistani former cricketer who played as a right-handed batter. She appeared in 15 One Day Internationals for Pakistan between 2001 and 2003, including playing at the inaugural edition of the Women's Cricket World Cup Qualifier in 2003.
