= Maki Kenjo =

Japanese cricketer

Personal information
- Full name: Maki Kenjo
- Born: 28 November 1970 (age 55); Japan
- Batting: Right-handed
- Bowling: Right-arm slow

International information
- National side: Japan
- ODI debut (cap 5): 21 July 2003 v Pakistan
- Last ODI: 25 July 2003 v Scotland

Career statistics
Competition	WODI
Matches	3
Runs scored	0
Batting average	0.00
100s/50s	0/0
Top score	0
Balls bowled	102
Wickets	0
Bowling average	–
5 wickets in innings	–
10 wickets in match	–
Best bowling	–
Catches/stumpings	0/–
- Source: ESPNcricinfo, 25 September 2011

Maki Kenjo (born 28 November 1970) is a Japanese former cricketer who played three Women's One Day International cricket matches for Japan national women's cricket team, all of them in July 2003.
