= Caroline Hes =

Dutch cricketer (born 1982)

Personal information
- Full name: Caroline Myrtle Willemijn Hes
- Born: November 11, 1982 (age 44); The Hague, Netherlands
- Batting: Right-handed
- Bowling: Right-arm medium-fast

International information
- National side: Netherlands
- ODI debut (cap 60): 10 August 2001 v Ireland
- Last ODI: 11 August 2001 v England

Career statistics
Competition	WODI
Matches	2
Runs scored	–
Batting average	–
100s/50s	–
Top score	–
Balls bowled	24
Wickets	1
Bowling average	10.00
5 wickets in innings	0
10 wickets in match	0
Best bowling	1/10
Catches/stumpings	0/–
- Source: Cricinfo, 28 December 2017

Caroline Myrtle Willemijn Hes (born 11 November 1982) is a Dutch woman cricketer. She made her international debut at the 2001 Women's European Cricket Championship. Caroline has played in 2 Women's ODIs.
