= Darren Gerard =

English cricketer

Medal record

Representing United Kingdom

Cricket

Maccabiah Games
Bronze medal – third place	2005 Maccabiah	Cricket

Darren Charles Gerard (born 17 April 1984) is a cricketer who represented Oxford University in matches against Cambridge University in 2004 and 2006.

== Early and personal life ==
Gerard was born in Barnet, Hertfordshire, England, and is Jewish. He attended Lochinver House School, Haileybury College, and St Edmund Hall, Oxford.

== Cricket career ==
In the 2004 contest at Lord's he took 5/29 as Oxford won by eight wickets. Gerard was used as a net bowler by England during their tour of South Africa in 2004/05.

Gerard led the Great Britain cricket squad at the 2005 Maccabiah Games in Israel, where they gained a bronze medal, their first in over 12 years at the Games.

In 2006 he made his first-class debut, taking 2/25.

In 2008, he was named along with Mark Bott and Jason Molins to the Maccabi GB cricket team to represent the United Kingdom at the 2009 Maccabiah Games.

In 2016, Gerard made his debut on the US Cricket team with a loss to the British Army.

== See also ==
- List of select Jewish cricketers
