= Sportpark Klein Zwitserland =

Sports grounds in The Hague, Netherlands

Coordinates: 52°06′20.73″N 04°18′29.50″E

Ground information
- Location: The Hague, Netherlands
- Establishment: 1987 (first recorded match)
- Capacity: Unknown

International information
- Only WODI: 25 July 2003: Japan v Scotland
- As of 3 September 2020; Source: Ground profile

Sportpark Klein Zwitserland is a field hockey and cricket ground in The Hague, the Netherlands. The first recorded cricket match held on the ground came in 1987 when the Netherlands Women played the visiting Ireland Women. The ground later held six ICC Trophy matches in the 1990. The ground held a Women's One Day International in 2003 between Japan Women and Scotland Women in the IWCC Trophy.
