= Lara Molins =

Irish cricketer

Personal information
- Full name: Lara Deborah Molins
- Born: 28 March 1980 (age 46); Dublin, Ireland
- Batting: Right-handed
- Bowling: Right-arm medium
- Role: Bowler
- Relatives: Jason Molins (cousin); GL Molins (cousin)

International information
- National side: Ireland
- ODI debut (cap 40): 26 June 1999 v India
- Last ODI: 12 August 2001 v England

Career statistics
| Competition | WODI |
|---|---|
| Matches | 7 |
| Runs scored | 13 |
| Batting average | 2.60 |
| 100s/50s | 0/0 |
| Top score | 8 |
| Balls bowled | 168 |
| Wickets | 6 |
| Bowling average | 14.33 |
| 5 wickets in innings | 0 |
| 10 wickets in match | 0 |
| Best bowling | 2/5 |
| Catches/stumpings | 2/– |
- Source: CricketArchive, 6 January 2015

Lara Molins Caplin (born Lara Deborah Molins; 28 March 1980) is an Irish cricketer who played at One Day International (ODI) level for the Irish national side between 1999 and 2001, including at the 2000 World Cup.

== Biography ==
Born to a Jewish family in Dublin, Molins is the cousin of two brothers, Jason and Greg Molins, who both played for the Irish men's team (though not at ODI level). Playing school cricket for Wesley College and club cricket for Railway Union, she made her under-23 debut for Ireland at the age of 16, at the 1996 European Under-23 Championship. Molins made her ODI debut for Ireland in June 1999, in a one-off game played while India were touring England. She was one of two debutants for Ireland in the match, the other being Isobel Joyce. Molins went wicketless, as did every other Irish bowler, as the two Indian opening batsmen (Reshma Gandhi and Mithali Raj) both scored unbeaten centuries. She was next selected for an ODI in July 2000, when Pakistan toured to play five ODIs and a single Test (to date, Ireland's only Test against any country). Her sole match in that series was the third ODI, when she took 2/34 from 10 overs to help Ireland win by 150 runs.

At the 2000 World Cup, played in New Zealand in December 2000, Molins once again played only a single match, against Australia in Christchurch. She had no opportunity to bowl, as Australia required only 20 overs to chase down Ireland's target of 90. Her next ODI was also against Australia, in Dublin in July 2001, and she again did not bowl, as the match was interrupted by rain. The following month, Molins appeared at the 2001 European Championship, playing in matches against England, the Netherlands, and Scotland. She took four wickets while conceding just 15 runs, and consequently led the tournament's bowling averages. Her best figures came against England (in what was to be her final ODI), when she took 2/5 from two overs to help bowl out England for only 60 (at the time its lowest ODI total). Earlier in the tournament, against Scotland, Molins had taken the remarkable figures of 1/0 from five overs, bowling 30 balls without conceding a run. Only New Zealand's Debbie Hockley has bowled more overs without conceding a run (six, against Ireland in 1988).
