= Khursheed Jabeen =

Pakistani cricketer (born 1979)

Personal information
- Full name: Khursheed Jabeen
- Born: 17 October 1979 (age 47); Karachi, Pakistan
- Batting: Left-handed
- Bowling: Slow left-arm orthodox
- Role: Bowler

International information
- National side: Pakistan (2000–2006)
- Test debut (cap 14): 30 July 2000 v Ireland
- Last Test: 15 March 2004 v West Indies
- ODI debut (cap 23): 23 July 2000 v Ireland
- Last ODI: 14 December 2006 v Sri Lanka

Domestic team information
- Years: Team
- 2005/06–2010/11: Karachi

Career statistics
Competition	WTest	WODI	WLA
Matches	2	30	37
Runs scored	46	117	132
Batting average	15.33	5.85	6.28
100s/50s	0/0	0/0	0/0
Top score	20*	16	16
Balls bowled	150	1,364	1,640
Wickets	1	26	30
Bowling average	68.00	28.88	30.30
5 wickets in innings	0	0	0
10 wickets in match	0	0	0
Best bowling	1/6	3/2	3/2
Catches/stumpings	0/–	5/–	6/–
- Source: CricketArchive, 13 July 2021

Khursheed Jabeen (17 October 1979) is a Pakistani former cricketer who played as a slow left-arm orthodox bowler. She appeared in two Test matches and 30 One Day Internationals for Pakistan between 2000 and 2006. She played domestic cricket for Karachi.

In April 2001, Jabeen took three wickets in Pakistan's first ever international win, over the Netherlands.

As of September 2025, Jabeen continues to hold for over two decades the world record for the best economy rate in a WODIs innings. She achieved the feat when she conceded only 2 runs in 10 overs, while also taking three wickets, against Japan on 21 July 2003.
