= Eriko Sakata =

Japanese cricketer

Personal information
- Full name: Eriko Sakata
- Born: 20 June 1981 (age 45); Japan
- Batting: Right-handed
- Bowling: Right-arm slow

International information
- National side: Japan
- ODI debut (cap 14): 22 July 2003 v Ireland
- Last ODI: 23 July 2003 v Netherlands

Career statistics
Competition	WODI
Matches	2
Runs scored	0
Batting average	0.00
100s/50s	0/0
Top score	0
Balls bowled	66
Wickets	0
Bowling average	–
5 wickets in innings	–
10 wickets in match	–
Best bowling	–
Catches/stumpings	1/0
- Source: ESPNcricinfo, 25 September 2011

Eriko Sakata (born 20 June 1981) is a Japanese former cricketer who played two Women's One Day International cricket matches for Japan national women's cricket team in 2003.
