= Greg Molins =

Irish cricketer

Personal information
- Full name: Gregory Lee Molins
- Born: 19 March 1976 (age 50); Dublin, Ireland
- Batting: Right-handed
- Bowling: Slow left-arm orthodox
- Relatives: Jason Molins (brother); Lara Molins (cousin)

International information
- National side: Ireland (1996–1999)

Career statistics
Competition	First-class	List A
Matches	4	4
Runs scored	3	10
Batting average	1.50	3.33
100s/50s	0/0	0/0
Top score	2*	10
Balls bowled	551	162
Wickets	8	3
Bowling average	37.50	48.66
5 wickets in innings	0	0
10 wickets in match	0	0
Best bowling	3/62	2/44
Catches/stumpings	1/–	3/–
- Source: CricketArchive, 11 June 2015

Gregory Lee Molins (born 19 March 1976) is a former Irish cricketer. A left-arm orthodox spinner, he represented the Irish national side between 1996 and 1999, including at the 1997 ICC Trophy.

Molins is part of a prominent Irish cricketing family, with his older brother, Jason, and cousin, Lara, also representing Ireland internationally. He was born in Dublin, and attended The High School there, playing for the school team. He first came to prominence at the 1993 under-18 interprovincial tournament, taking three five-wicket hauls for Leinster to be named player of the tournament. Molins made his senior interprovincial debut in 1994, and the following year debuted for the Irish under-19 team. His first senior match for Ireland came in a friendly against Wales in June 1996. Later in the year, in August, he made his first-class debut, in what was then the annual fixture against Scotland.

At the 1997 ICC Trophy, Molins played in three of Ireland's matches, against Gibraltar, the United States, and Kenya, but took only two wickets. His 1997 season also included limited-overs games for Ireland in two English competitions (the Benson & Hedges Cup and the NatWest Trophy), and also in the Triple Crown Tournament. Molins' last capped game for Ireland came in 1999, when he was only 23. He continued playing interprovincial matches into the 2000s and Leinster Senior League matches into the 2010s, and toured Namibia with the Marylebone Cricket Club (MCC) in 2001. In 2008, Molins and his brother, both of Jewish extraction, were selected for an Israeli composite side which played against India A to celebrate the 60th anniversary of Israel's independence. The team also included various other Jewish players from around the world (including Adam Bacher, Steven Herzberg, Michael Klinger, and Bensiyon Songavkar), and two non-Jewish guest players (Roland Lefebvre and Jonty Rhodes). In April 2015, Molins was appointed a selector for the Irish national team.
