= Masumi Ishiyama =

Japanese cricketer

Personal information
- Full name: Masumi Ishiyama
- Born: 22 June 1981 (age 45); Japan
- Batting: Right-handed
- Bowling: Right-arm slow

International information
- National side: Japan
- ODI debut (cap 12): 22 July 2003 v Ireland
- Last ODI: 26 July 2003 v West Indies

Career statistics
Competition	WODI
Matches	3
Runs scored	6
Batting average	2.00
100s/50s	0/0
Top score	3
Balls bowled	18
Wickets	0
Bowling average	–
5 wickets in innings	–
10 wickets in match	–
Best bowling	–
Catches/stumpings	0/–
- Source: ESPNcricinfo, 25 September 2011

Masumi Ishiyama (born 22 June 1981) is a former Japanese cricketer who played three Women's One Day International cricket matches for Japan national women's cricket team, all in July 2003.
