= Willem Molenaar =

Dutch cricket umpire (born 1945)

Personal information
- Born: 20 August 1945
- Died: August 30, 2022 (aged 77)
- Relatives: Marjolijn Molenaar (daughter)

Umpiring information
- WODIs umpired: 4 (1984–2008)
- LA umpired: 4 (1999–2010)
- Source: CricketArchive, 29 August 2015

Joseph Pieter Anne Willem Molenaar (20 September 1945 – 30 August 2022) was a Dutch cricket umpire whose international career spanned from the early 1980s through to the early 2010s.

Molenaar first umpired an international match in 1983, when he officiated a match between the Dutch and Irish women's teams at the one-off Centenary Tournament in Utrecht. The following year, he umpired a women's One Day International (ODI) between the Netherlands and New Zealand, which was the Dutch team's first ODI. Molenaar's first major men's tournament was the 1990 ICC Trophy, which was hosted by the Netherlands. He officiated several group-stage matches and the semi-final between Bangladesh and Zimbabwe, and returned for the 1994 edition in Kenya.

Outside of Hoofdklasse (top-class) league matches, Molenaar regularly umpired matches between Dutch sides and touring international sides throughout the 1990s and 2000s. He made his umpiring debut in list-A matches during the 1999 NatWest Trophy season, officiating a game between the Netherlands and Durham at the VRA Ground in Amstelveen. Molenaar also umpired games at the 2003 and 2004 editions of the competition (renamed the C&G Trophy), though neither of those games involved the Netherlands. In March 2007, he was appointed to ICC Europe's inaugural European Umpire Panel, as one of five Dutch umpires.

In August 2007, after a gap of almost 23 years since his first women's ODI, Molenaar umpired two more matches, during the South African tour of the Netherlands. Later in the month, when Bermuda toured, he was also reserve umpire for two men's ODIs. Molenaar's last women's ODI to date came in July 2008, when the West Indian team toured. In September 2009, when Afghanistan toured, he was the third umpire for one of the men's ODIs. His final list-A match as an umpire (to date) came in July 2010, a one-day match between the Netherlands and a Zimbabwe XI that preceded an Intercontinental Cup fixture. Molenaar's daughter, Marjolijn Molenaar, has played at ODI level for the Netherlands.
