= Aya Fujishiro =

Japanese cricketer

Personal information
- Full name: Aya Fujishiro
- Born: 6 November 1974 (age 52); Japan
- Batting: Right-handed
- Bowling: Right-arm medium-fast
- Role: Wicket-keeper

International information
- National side: Japan
- ODI debut (cap 1): 26 July 2003 v Pakistan
- Last ODI: 26 July 2003 v West Indies

Career statistics
Competition	WODI
Matches	4
Runs scored	6
Batting average	1.50
100s/50s	0/0
Top score	3
Catches/stumpings	0/0
- Source: ESPNcricinfo, 25 September 2011

Aya Fujishiro (born 6 November 1974) is a Japanese former cricketer who played four Women's One Day International cricket matches for Japan national women's cricket team in 2003.
