= List of Japan women ODI cricketers =

A One Day International (ODI) is an international cricket match between two teams, each having ODI status, as determined by the International Cricket Council. The women's variant of the game is similar to the men's version, with minor modifications to umpiring and pitch requirements. The first women's ODI was played in 1973, between England and Australia. Japan have played five ODIs, all as part of the 2003 IWCC Trophy, which served as a qualification competition for the 2005 World Cup. They lost all five matches, and did not compete in the subsequent 2008 World Cup Qualifier, but did reappear at the 2011 World Cup Qualifier (where matches did not have ODI status).

Five players have appeared in all of Japan's ODI matches; Kaori Kato, Shizuka Kubota, Ema Kuribayashi, Momoko Saito and Keiko Uchibori. Kubota and Kuribayashi have scored 27 runs each in those games, making them Japan women's most prolific batters in the format, although Kato's 16 runs were scored at a superior average. Kato, who captained Japan in all of their ODI matches, is also the nation's leading wicket-taker, having taken five wickets. Yuko Sasaki, who only appeared in three of their matches, has the best bowling average, 27.00, and the best bowling performance in an innings, taking two wickets for only six runs against Scotland.

In the team's five matches, 14 women represented Japan in One Day International cricket. This list includes all players who have played at least one ODI match and is initially arranged in the order of debut appearance. Where more than one player won their first cap in the same match, their surnames are initially listed alphabetically.

== Key ==
General

- ‡ – Captain
- † – Wicket-keeper
- Mat – Number of matches played

Batting

- Inn – Number of innings batted
- NO – Number of innings not out
- Runs – Runs scored in career
- HS – Highest score
- Avg – Runs scored per dismissal
- * – Batsman remained not out

Bowling

- Balls – Balls bowled in career
- Wkt – Wickets taken in career
- BBI – Best bowling in an innings
- Ave – Average runs per wicket

Fielding

- Ca – Catches taken
- St – Stumpings effected

== List of players ==
Statistics are correct as on 26 July 2003, the date of Japan's last women's ODI (Japan Women are not currently active in Women's One Day International cricket). This list includes all players who have played at least one ODI match and is initially arranged in the order of debut appearance. Where more than one player won their first cap in the same match, those players are initially listed alphabetically.

No.	Name	First	Last	Mat	Batting					Bowling				Fielding		Ref
No.	Name	First	Last	Mat	Inn	NO	Runs	HS	Avg	Balls	Wkt	BBI	Ave	Ca	St	Ref
1	Aya Fujishiro †	2003	2003	4	4	0	6	3	1.50	–	–	–	–	0	0	
2	Ritsuko Hiroto	2003	2003	4	4	2	0	0*	0.00	144	1	1/43	143.00	1	0	
3	Izumi Iimura †	2003	2003	3	3	0	5	5	1.66	–	–	–	–	0	1	
4	Kaori Kato ‡	2003	2003	5	5	3	16	8*	8.00	239	5	2/23	32.00	0	0	
5	Maki Kenjo	2003	2003	3	3	0	0	0	0.00	102	0	–	–	0	0	
6	Michiko Kono	2003	2003	4	4	0	2	1	0.50	108	2	2/22	39.00	0	0	
7	Shizuka Kubota	2003	2003	5	5	0	27	14	5.40	–	–	–	–	1	0	
8	Ema Kuribayashi †	2003	2003	5	5	0	27	18	5.40	–	–	–	–	1	1	
9	Momoko Saito	2003	2003	5	5	0	18	8	3.60	–	–	–	–	1	0	
10	Yūko Sasaki	2003	2003	3	3	0	10	6	3.33	73	3	2/6	27.00	1	0	
11	Keiko Uchibori	2003	2003	5	5	0	3	3	0.60	150	2	1/33	65.50	0	0	
12	Masumi Ishiyama	2003	2003	3	3	0	6	3	2.00	–	–	–	–	0	0	
13	Ayako Miyazaki	2003	2003	4	4	0	23	9	5.75	60	1	1/41	57.00	0	0	
14	Eriko Sakata	2003	2003	2	1	0	0	0	0.00	66	0	–	–	1	0	
