= Eugenie van Leeuwen =

Dutch cricketer (born 1970)

Personal information
- Born: 1 August 1970 (age 56); The Hague, Netherlands
- Batting: Left-handed
- Bowling: Right-arm medium
- Role: Bowler

International information
- National side: Netherlands
- ODI debut (cap 52): 29 March 1999 v Sri Lanka
- Last ODI: 26 July 2003 v Pakistan

Career statistics
Competition	WODI
Matches	17
Runs scored	103
Batting average	14.71
100s/50s	0/0
Top score	18
Balls bowled	678
Wickets	17
Bowling average	23.17
5 wickets in innings	0
10 wickets in match	0
Best bowling	2/11
Catches/stumpings	2/–
- Source: ESPNcricinfo, 26 October 2017

Eugenie van Leeuwen (born 1 August 1970) is a former Dutch cricketer who represented the Netherlands women's national cricket team.

A bowler, Van Leeuwen played in 17 women's One Day Internationals (WODI) between 1999 and 2003. She made her international debut for the Netherlands in their fourth WODI against Sri Lanka in 1999, taking the wicket of opener Hiruka Fernando. She played in six games of the seven-match WODI tour of Pakistan in 2001, taking five wickets at an average of 30. Four month later, she played in all three Dutch matches of the Women's European Cricket Championship in England. She took just one wicket in the tournament – that of Linda Spence, the Scottish captain in the Netherlands' sole match victory.

In June 2002, she played her first WODI series at home against the touring New Zealand side. Playing in the opening and last games, she took two wickets in the three match series that was swept by the White Ferns. Van Leeuwen played in her final WODIs during the 2003 IWCC Trophy in the Netherlands. Playing five matches in six days, she took eight wickets at an average of 12.62, including career best figures of 2/11 against Japan.
