= Momoko Saito (cricketer) =

Japanese cricketer

Personal information
- Full name: Momoko Saito
- Born: 8 September 1981 (age 45); Japan
- Batting: Right-handed
- Bowling: Right-arm medium-fast

International information
- National side: Japan
- ODI debut (cap 9): 21 July 2003 v Pakistan
- Last ODI: 26 July 2003 v West Indies

Career statistics
Competition	WODI
Matches	5
Runs scored	18
Batting average	3.60
100s/50s	0/0
Top score	8
Catches/stumpings	1/–
- Source: ESPNcricinfo, 25 September 2011

Momoko Saito (born 8 September 1981) is a former Japanese cricketer who played five Women's One Day International cricket matches for Japan national women's cricket team, all in July 2003.
