= Michiko Kono =

Japanese cricketer

Personal information
- Full name: Michiko Kono
- Born: 17 September 1974 (age 52); Japan
- Batting: Right-handed
- Bowling: Right-arm medium-fast

International information
- National side: Japan
- ODI debut (cap 6): 21 July 2003 v Pakistan
- Last ODI: 26 July 2003 v West Indies

Career statistics
Competition	WODI
Matches	4
Runs scored	2
Batting average	0.50
100s/50s	0/0
Top score	1
Balls bowled	108
Wickets	2
Bowling average	39.00
5 wickets in innings	0
10 wickets in match	0
Best bowling	2/22
Catches/stumpings	0/–
- Source: ESPNcricinfo, 25 September 2011

Michiko Kono (born 17 September 1974) is a former Japanese cricketer who played four Women's One Day International cricket matches for Japan national women's cricket team, all within a six-day period in July 2003.
