= Ritsuko Hiroto =

Japanese cricketer

Personal information
- Full name: Ritsuko Hiroto
- Born: 26 July 1981 (age 45); Japan
- Batting: Right-handed
- Bowling: Right-arm medium-fast

International information
- National side: Japan
- ODI debut (cap 2): 21 July 2003 v Pakistan
- Last ODI: 26 July 2003 v West Indies

Career statistics
Competition	WODI
Matches	4
Runs scored	0
Batting average	0.00
100s/50s	0/0
Top score	0*
Balls bowled	144
Wickets	1
Bowling average	143.00
5 wickets in innings	0
10 wickets in match	0
Best bowling	1/43
Catches/stumpings	1/–
- Source: Cricinfo, 25 September 2011

Ritsuko Hiroto (born 26 July 1981) is a former Japanese cricketer who played four Women's One Day International cricket matches for Japan national women's cricket team in 2003.
