= Jason Molins =

Irish cricketer (born 1974)

Personal information
- Full name: Jason Adam Max Molins
- Born: 4 December 1974 (age 51); Dublin, Ireland
- Batting: Right-handed
- Bowling: Slow left-arm orthodox
- Relatives: Greg Molins (brother); Lara Molins (cousin)

International information
- National side: Ireland (1995–2006)

Career statistics
Competition	First-class	List A
Matches	11	23
Runs scored	435	466
Batting average	25.58	20.26
100s/50s	0/4	0/3
Top score	73	84
Balls bowled	6	1
Wickets	1	–
Bowling average	12.00	–
5 wickets in innings	0	–
10 wickets in match	0	–
Best bowling	1/12	–
Catches/stumpings	3/–	7/–
- Source: CricketArchive, 11 June 2015

Jason Adam Max Molins (born 4 December 1974) is an Irish former cricketer. He played as a right-handed batsman, with his career for the Irish national side spanning from 1995 to 2006, which included a spell as the captain of the team.

== Early and personal life ==
Molins was born in Dublin, and is Jewish. His father is Rodney Molins. His brother, Greg, and cousin, Lara Molins, also played for Ireland.

He was initially educated in Ireland and then finished his studies in England. He attended secondary school Wesley College and Dublin High School. He studied for an economics degree at University College Dublin, and then completed his post-graduate diploma at the University of Oxford in 1997. Following this, he moved to London where he worked as a fixed income analyst for an investment management company following a number of other roles in the City including corporate finance. Molins married Aoife Mulholland, a West End actress from Galway, in 2009. In 2015 he relocated back to Ireland with his wife and two boys (Max and Brody), to start a career as an Equity Analyst at Goodbody Stockbrokers. They now reside in Dublin with their three boys.

== Cricket career ==
He debuted at first-class level for Ireland in 1998 and while studying at Keble College, Oxford, received his Oxford Blue in 1998, scoring a half century in the Varsity match at Lords. He participated in the 2001 and 2005 ICC Trophy tournaments, and aided them to that year's finals, where they lost against Scotland. He captained Ireland between 2001 and 2005, and was instrumental in the victories over Zimbabwe (scoring 107 not out), Surrey (scoring 56), and the West Indies (scoring 66). He is Ireland's most successful captain, having captained Ireland on no fewer than 45 occasions, and has a win ratio of over 60%.

Despite his prior role as captain, Molins was not selected for Ireland at the 2007 World Cup, and never played at One Day International (ODI) level. In 2008, he was named along with Mark Bott and Darren Gerard to the Maccabi GB cricket team to represent the United Kingdom at the 2009 Maccabiah Games.

== See also ==
- List of select Jewish cricketers
