= Minou Toussaint =

Dutch cricketer (born 1983)

Personal information
- Born: 7 October 1983 (age 43); Deventer, Netherlands
- Role: Wicket-keeper

International information
- National side: Netherlands
- ODI debut (cap 56): 9 April 2001 v Pakistan
- Last ODI: 28 June 2002 v New Zealand

Career statistics
Competition	WODI
Matches	9
Runs scored	22
Batting average	5.50
100s/50s	0/0
Top score	7
Catches/stumpings	5/1
- Source: Cricinfo, 28 December 2017

Minou Toussaint (7 October 1983) is a former Dutch woman cricketer. She has played for Netherlands in 9 Women's ODIs. Minou was a member of the Dutch cricket team in the 2001 Women's European Cricket Championship.
