= William Maundrell =

Japanese-born English cricketer

Personal information
- Full name: William Herbert Maundrell
- Born: 5 November 1876; Nagasaki, Kyūshū, Empire of Japan
- Died: 17 June 1958 (aged 81); Deal, Kent, England
- Batting: Right-handed

Domestic team information
- Years: Team
- 1900: Hampshire

Career statistics
Competition	First-class
Matches	1
Runs scored	0
Batting average	0.00
100s/50s	–/–
Top score	0
Catches/stumpings	–/–
- Source: Cricinfo, 28 December 2009

William Herbert Maundrell (5 November 1876 — 17 June 1958) was an English first-class cricketer and clergyman, spending nearly twenty years as a chaplain with the Royal Navy Chaplaincy Service.

== Life and ecclesiastical duties ==
The son of Herbert Mandrell, who was an archdeacon in Japan, he was born at Nagasaki in November 1876. He was educated in England at The King's School in Canterbury, before matriculating to Corpus Christi College, Cambridge. There he excelled in athletics, gaining a blue in hurdling. While studying for his master's degree, he made a single appearance in first-class cricket for Hampshire against Derbyshire at Derby in the 1900 County Championship. Batting once in the match, he was dismissed without scoring by John Hulme. After graduating from Cambridge, Maundrell became an assistant-master at The King's School in 1904, a post he would hold until 1907. The year after taking up his teaching post, he was ordained as a deacon at Canterbury Cathedral and became a priest in 1906.

In December 1907, Maundrell joined the Royal Navy Chaplaincy Service (RNCS). His first appointment as chaplain was aboard HMS Monmouth, and from later in 1908 to 1910 he was aboard HMS Bedford. He survived Bedford's running aground in the East China Sea in the early hours of 21 August 1910 and was rescued by Monmouth. He led the memorial service for the 18 seamen killed in the accident, with the hymns "Rock of Ages" and "Abide with Me" being sung. He was reassigned aboard HMS Neptune the following year, serving aboard her until 1914. During 1914, he served aboard both HMS Iron Duke and HMS Majestic. Maundrell continued to serve during the First World War, firstly aboard HMS Prince George until 1916, and then for the remainder of the war at the shore establishment Royal Naval College, Osborne. Following the war, he continued to serve at shore establishments. He was chaplain at H.M. Dockyard at British Malta from 1919 to 1921, before returning to England, where he was chaplain at the Royal Marines Barracks in Portsmouth. His final appointment came in 1927, when he was appointed chaplain at the Royal Marine Depot, Deal. He retired from the RNCS in 1931, becoming reverend at Ringwould in Kent until 1940. During the Second World War, he was the assistant-secretary to The Mission to Seafarers. Maundrell died in June 1958 at Deal, Kent.
