= Aoife Budd =

Irish cricketer

Personal information
- Full name: Aoife Maud Budd
- Born: 10 May 1980 (age 46); Dublin, Ireland
- Batting: Right-handed
- Bowling: Right-arm medium
- Role: Batter
- Relatives: Una Budd (sister)

International information
- National side: Ireland (2000–2001)
- ODI debut (cap 43): 25 July 2000 v Pakistan
- Last ODI: 12 August 2001 v England

Career statistics
| Competition | WODI |
|---|---|
| Matches | 4 |
| Runs scored | 10 |
| Batting average | 5.00 |
| 100s/50s | 0/0 |
| Top score | 4* |
| Balls bowled | 24 |
| Wickets | 0 |
| Bowling average | – |
| 5 wickets in innings | 0 |
| 10 wickets in match | 0 |
| Best bowling | – |
| Catches/stumpings | 1/– |
- Source: ESPNcricinfo, 30 October 2020

Aoife Maud Budd (born 10 May 1980) is an Irish former cricketer who represented the Irish national team between 2000 and 2001. Her sister Una also represented Ireland between 1998 and 2005. Budd made her Women's One Day International debut in 2000 in a match against Pakistan women; she made 4*, her highest score in an ODI, and took 0/8 from 3 overs. Her last ODI appearance was in 2001, although in 2005, Budd was selected in a preliminary 18-person training squad for the 2005 Women's Cricket World Cup. She did not make the final squad, and was instead a reserve player for the tournament.

In 2001, Budd was in the Ireland under-19 squad for the 2001 Women's European Cricket Championship. In 2002, Budd was awarded a cricket scholarship by Trinity College, Dublin.
