= Gregor Kennis =

English cricketer

Personal information
- Full name: Gregor John Kennis
- Born: 9 March 1974 (age 52); Yokohama, Japan
- Batting: Right-handed
- Bowling: Right-arm off break
- Role: Batsman; Somerset Assistant Coach

Domestic team information
- Years: Team
- 1994–1997: Surrey
- 1998–2000: Somerset
- FC debut: 11 June 1994; Surrey v Oxford University
- Last FC: 25 June 1999; Somerset v New Zealanders
- LA debut: 2 May 1994 Surrey v New Zealanders
- Last LA: 25 June 2000 Somerset v Zimbabweans

Career statistics
Competition	FC	LA
Matches	12	4
Runs scored	436	39
Batting average	19.81	13.00
100s/50s	1/0	0/0
Top score	175	27
Balls bowled	24	–
Wickets	0	–
Bowling average	–	–
5 wickets in innings	–	–
10 wickets in match	–	n/a
Best bowling	–	–
Catches/stumpings	13/–	1/–
- Source: ESPNcricinfo, 8 April 2018

Gregor John Kennis (born 9 March 1974) played first-class and List A cricket for Surrey between 1994 and 1997 and for Somerset between 1998 and 2000. He was born in Yokohama, Japan.

Kennis was a right-handed batsman who opened the innings in some matches, but in others batted as low as No 8 in the batting order. He also bowled four overs of right-arm off-spin in his first-class cricket career. He was an occasional first-class cricketer: one first-class match in each of his first three seasons from 1994 to 1996, all of them for Surrey, and then three in each of his final three first-class seasons, 1997 to 1999, the first of those seasons for Surrey, the final two for Somerset. His limited-overs cricket career was just as spasmodic: one match for Surrey in both 1994 and 1995; one match for Somerset in both 1999 and 2000. He was a more regular second eleven player for Surrey from 1993, and in 1998, he appeared for four different second teams in the Second Eleven Championship: Surrey, Worcestershire, Middlesex and Somerset.

Kennis had limited success in both first-class and limited-overs cricket as a batsman until his very last first-class match. His highest score in his six games for Surrey was his 29 against Kent in 1995 and he did not reach double figures in List A cricket for Surrey. Playing for Somerset in 1998, he scored 49 in the match against Derbyshire, but made only 22 runs in five other innings that season. He was having no greater success in 1999 until picked for the match against the New Zealand touring team when, opening the innings, he made 175, hitting 35 fours. In the innings, however, Kennis injured his back and in the second innings he batted at No 9. He was unable to play again in the 1999 season and returned for only a single List A match in 2000 against the Zimbabweans, in which he made his highest limited-overs score of 27.
