= 2020 Japan Premier League =

Japan Premier League

- Dates: 23 July – 26 July 2020
- Administrator: Japan Cricket Association (JCA)
- Cricket format: Twenty20
- Tournament format(s): Single Round-robin and Finals
- Host: Japan
- Champions: South Kanto, Super Kings (4th title)
- Runners-up: East Kanto, Sunrisers
- Participants: 5
- Matches: 10
- Player of the series: Sabaorish Ravichandran (South Kanto, Super Kings) (100 runs and 3 wickets)
- Most runs: Sabaorish Ravichandran (South Kanto, Super Kings) (100)
- Most wickets: Kouhei Kubota (South Kanto, Super Kings) (6); Naveen Negi (East Kanto, Sunrisers) (6)
- Official website: cricket.or.jp/en/archives/competition/japan-premier-league

The 2020 Japan Premier League was the 4th season of the Japan Premier League, the highest level of domestic cricket in Japan. It was won by South Kanto, Super Kings, who won their 4th title.

== Teams ==
Region	Team
East Kanto	Sunrisers
North Kanto	Lions
South Kanto	Super Kings
West Kanto	Hurricanes
Kansai	Chargers
