= Keiko Uchibori =

Japanese cricketer

Personal information
- Full name: Keiko Uchibori
- Born: 13 October 1976 (age 50); Japan
- Batting: Right-handed
- Bowling: Right-arm medium-fast

International information
- National side: Japan
- ODI debut (cap 11): 21 July 2003 v Pakistan
- Last ODI: 26 July 2003 v West Indies

Career statistics
Competition	WODI
Matches	5
Runs scored	3
Batting average	0.60
100s/50s	0/0
Top score	3
Balls bowled	150
Wickets	2
Bowling average	65.50
5 wickets in innings	0
10 wickets in match	0
Best bowling	1/33
Catches/stumpings	0/–
- Source: ESPNcricinfo, 25 September 2011

Keiko Uchibori (born 13 October 1976) is a Japanese former cricketer who played five Women's One Day International cricket matches for Japan national women's cricket team, all of them in July 2003.
