= List of Japan women Twenty20 International cricketers =

This is a list of Japan women Twenty20 International cricketers. A Twenty20 International is an international cricket match between two representative teams, each having Twenty20 International status, as determined by the International Cricket Council (ICC). A Twenty20 International is played under the rules of Twenty20 cricket.

This list includes all players who have played at least one T20I match for Japan and is initially arranged in the order of debut appearance. Where more than one player won their first cap in the same match, those players are initially listed alphabetically at the time of debut.

== Key ==
General

- ‡ – Captain
- † – Wicket-keeper
- First – Year of debut
- Last – Year of latest game
- Mat – Number of matches played

Batting

- Runs – Runs scored in career
- HS – Highest score
- Avg – Runs scored per dismissal
- * – Batsman remained not out

Bowling

- Wkt – Wickets taken in career
- BBI – Best bowling in an innings
- Ave – Average runs per wicket

Fielding

- Ca – Catches taken
- St – Stumpings affected

== Players ==
Statistics are correct as of 18 September 2026.

Japan women T20I cricketers
General					Batting				Bowling				Fielding		Ref
No.	Name	First	Last	Mat	Runs	HS	Avg	50	Balls	Wkt	BBI	Ave	Ca	St	Ref
1	Rio Endo	2019	2019	8	33	13	5.50	0	79	6	2/14	17.00	1	0	
2	Erika Oda	2019	2026	52	807	52*	17.93	1	–	–	–	–	8	0	
3	Eri Iko	2019	2019	4	36	22	9.00	0	–	–	–	–	2	0	
4	Miho Kanno	2019	2019	9	82	21*	10.25	0	150	6	2/14	22.66	0	0	
5	Akari Nishimura†	2019	2026	52	392	54	10.31	1	–	–	–	–	15	10	
6	Akari Kitayama	2019	2019	9	90	63	10.00	1	–	–	–	–	1	0	
7	Shizuka Miyaji	2019	2022	13	173	47	21.62	0	272	8	2/19	28.50	1	0	
8	Kasumi Nanno	2019	2019	5	5	5*	5.00	0	54	4	3/19	16.50	2	0	
9	Madoka Shiraishi	2019	2019	6	17	7	3.40	0	–	–	–	–	1	0	
10	Nao Tokizawa	2019	2019	9	80	28	11.42	0	167	6	3/6	21.33	1	0	
11	Mai Yanagida‡	2019	2026	62	777	67	15.85	3	521	27	4/8	15.62	11	0	
12	Ayaka Kanada	2019	2022	8	37	29*	6.16	0	41	1	1/8	45.00	2	0	
13	Ruan Kanai	2019	2023	10	18	7	4.50	0	66	3	1/10	20.33	2	0	
14	Kotone Taniguchi†	2019	2019	3	4	3	2.00	0	–	–	–	–	1	0	
15	Kiyo Fujikawa	2019	2024	12	16	5*	4.00	0	140	5	2/4	19.60	1	0	
16	Ahilya Chandel	2022	2026	49	407	36*	12.33	0	987	41	4/8	19.12	9	0	
17	Hinase Goto†	2022	2026	45	305	45	9.24	0	18	0	–	–	6	4	
18	Haruna Iwasaki	2022	2026	42	429	50	10.72	0	–	–	–	–	20	0	
19	Shimako Kato	2022	2026	37	320	30	12.30	0	698	23	3/8	23.95	7	0	
20	Mako Munakata	2022	2022	1	3	3*	–	0	–	–	–	–	0	0	
21	Minami Yoshioka	2022	2023	10	43	17	7.16	0	–	–	–	–	0	0	
22	Ayumi Fujikawa	2022	2026	34	105	17	11.66	0	564	29	4/4	17.86	5	0	
23	Meg Ogawa	2022	2026	9	26	17	13.00	0	57	2	1/13	40.50	0	0	
24	Elena Kusuda-Nairn	2023	2026	25	13	10*	3.25	0	380	13	2/10	27.15	3	0	
25	Kurumi Ota	2023	2026	38	241	57*	12.68	1	538	26	3/13	19.73	9	0	
26	Nonoha Yasumoto	2023	2026	37	18	7	3.00	0	690	35	4/11	13.82	2	0	
27	Seika Sumi	2023	2026	33	198	26*	9.90	0	30	0	–	–	5	0	
28	Yukino Nakayama	2023	2023	1	–	–	–	–	–	–	–	–	0	0	
29	Erika Toguchi-Quinn	2023	2025	32	44	8	3.66	0	543	35	5/6	12.97	11	0	
30	Shrunali Ranade	2023	2024	4	0	0	0.00	0	48	4	3/10	10.50	0	0	
31	Palak Gundecha	2023	2024	2	1	1*	–	0	30	2	1/23	24.00	0	0	
32	Rino Morita	2024	2025	4	23	17	7.66	0	6	0	–	–	0	0	
33	Ayaka Kato-Stafford	2025	2026	10	346	84	43.25	2	198	13	4/4	11.30	8	0	
34	Mamta Kaswan	2025	2026	6	2	2*	0	2.00	114	6	3/12	15.00	1	0	
35	Bianca Shino Dyson	2026	2026	1	0	0*	0	0	–	–	–	–	0	0	
