= Una Budd =

Irish cricketer

Personal information
- Full name: Una Grace Budd
- Born: 28 October 1975 (age 51); Merrion, Dublin, Ireland
- Batting: Right-handed
- Role: Batter
- Relatives: Aoife Budd (sister)

International information
- National side: Ireland (2003–2005)
- ODI debut (cap 49): 26 July 2003 v Scotland
- Last ODI: 1 April 2005 v Australia

Career statistics
Competition	WODI	WLA
Matches	8	10
Runs scored	79	124
Batting average	13.16	15.50
100s/50s	0/0	0/0
Top score	33*	33*
Balls bowled	–	18
Wickets	–	0
Bowling average	–	–
5 wickets in innings	–	0
10 wickets in match	–	0
Best bowling	–	–
Catches/stumpings	0/–	0/–
- Source: CricketArchive, 23 April 2022

Una Grace Budd (born 28 October 1975) is an Irish former cricketer who played as a right-handed batter. She appeared in three One Day Internationals for Ireland between 2003 and 2005.

Budd was born in Dublin. Her younger sister, Aoife Budd, also played international cricket for Ireland. Budd made her debut for Ireland in 1998, on a tour of England. However, her international debut came over five years later, when she played an ODI match against Scotland at the 2003 IWCC Trophy in the Netherlands. She scored 33* on debut, which was to be the highest score of her ODI career. Budd made her final appearances for Ireland at the 2005 World Cup in South Africa. She played in all six of her team's matches, making 43 runs from five innings.
