= Birgit Viguurs =

Dutch cricketer (born 1972)

Personal information
- Born: 24 June 1972 (age 54); Vught, Netherlands

International information
- National side: Netherlands
- ODI debut (cap 59): 9 April 2001 v Pakistan
- Last ODI: 19 August 2005 v Ireland

Career statistics
Competition	WODI
Matches	13
Runs scored	108
Batting average	9.81
100s/50s	0/1
Top score	58*
Balls bowled	316
Wickets	10
Bowling average	19.70
5 wickets in innings	0
10 wickets in match	0
Best bowling	3/7
Catches/stumpings	0/0
- Source: Cricinfo, 20 November 2017

Birgit Viguurs (born 24 June 1972) is a former Dutch woman cricketer. She has played for Dutch cricket team in 13 Women's ODIs. Birgit was also the member of the Netherlands cricket team in the inaugural edition of the Women's Cricket World Cup Qualifier in 2003.
