= Eric Budd =

English cricket administrator

Eric B Budd (21 June 1924 - 29 March 2006) was a leading English cricket administrator.

Eric Budd was born in Exeter, Devon. He served The Cricket Society and Surrey County Cricket Club with distinction. He joined the Society in 1982 and became Meetings Convenor in 1984. He succeeded Eric Rice as the General Secretary of the Cricket Society in 1987 and became vice-chairman in 2000. He managed the Oval Shop, with his late second wife Joy for Surrey CCC for a long period. He retired to the Netherlands following his third marriage, before returning to Britain. He died in Exeter, after a long illness.
