= Izumi Iimura =

Japanese cricketer

Personal information
- Full name: Izumi Iimura
- Born: 2 December 1980 (age 45); Japan
- Batting: Right-handed
- Bowling: Right-arm slow
- Role: Wicket-keeper

International information
- National side: Japan
- ODI debut (cap 3): 21 July 2003 v Pakistan
- Last ODI: 26 July 2003 v West Indies

Career statistics
Competition	WODI
Matches	3
Runs scored	5
Batting average	1.66
100s/50s	0/0
Top score	5
Catches/stumpings	0/1
- Source: ESPNcricinfo, 25 September 2011

Izumi Iimura (born 2 December 1980) is a former Japanese cricketer who played three Women's One Day International cricket matches for Japan national women's cricket team in July 2003.
