= Claudine van de Kieft =

Dutch cricketer

Personal information
- Full name: Claudine van de Kieft
- Born: 14 July 1972 (age 54); Netherlands
- Role: Bowler

International information
- National side: Netherlands (2001)
- ODI debut (cap 59): 11 April 2001 v Pakistan
- Last ODI: 18 April 2001 v Pakistan

Career statistics
Competition	WODI
Matches	5
Runs scored	3
Batting average	2.50
100s/50s	0/0
Top score	4
Balls bowled	174
Wickets	4
Bowling average	25.50
5 wickets in innings	0
10 wickets in match	0
Best bowling	2/21
Catches/stumpings	0/–
- Source: CricketArchive, 11 June 2021

Claudine van de Kieft (born 14 July 1972) is a Dutch former cricketer who played as a bowler. She appeared in 5 One Day Internationals for the Netherlands in 2001, all against Pakistan.

Her ODI best bowling figures came in the Netherlands' first win of the series, taking 2/21 from 6 overs as her side won by 57 runs.
