= Yūko Sasaki =

Japanese cricketer

Personal information
- Full name: Yūko Sasaki
- Born: 18 September 1982 (age 44); Saitama, Japan
- Batting: Right-handed
- Bowling: Right-arm medium-fast
- Role: Wicket-keeper

International information
- National side: Japan
- ODI debut (cap 10): 21 July 2003 v Pakistan
- Last ODI: 26 July 2003 v West Indies

Career statistics
Competition	ODI	LA
Matches	3	8
Runs scored	10	19
Batting average	3.33	2.37
100s/50s	0/0	0/0
Top score	6	7
Balls bowled	73	73
Wickets	3	3
Bowling average	27.00	27.00
5 wickets in innings	0	0
10 wickets in match	0	0
Best bowling	2/6	2/6
Catches/stumpings	1/0	3/1
- Source: CricketArchive, 12 December 2023

Yūko Sasaki (佐々木 優子, Sasaki Yūko; born 18 September 1982), also known as Yūko Saito, is a Japanese former cricketer who played for the national women's team in 2003 in three One Day International matches. Born in Saitama in 1982, she was primarily a wicket-keeper.
