= Jenny Mudie =

Scottish cricketer (born 1984)

Jennifer Mudie
Personal information
- Full name: Jennifer Mudie
- Born: 13 January 1984 (age 42); Forfar, Angus
- Batting: Right-handed
- Bowling: Left-arm medium-fast
- Role: Batsman

International information
- National side: Scotland (2003–2003)
- ODI debut (cap 16): 21 July 2003 v Netherlands
- Last ODI: 26 July 2003 v Ireland

Career statistics
Competition	ODI
Matches	3
Runs scored	–
Batting average	–
100s/50s	–
Top score	–
Balls bowled	126
Wickets	2
Bowling average	49.00
5 wickets in innings	0
10 wickets in match	0
Best bowling	1/13
Catches/stumpings	0/–
- Source: Cricinfo, 22 September 2020

Jennifer Mudie (born 13 January 1984) is a former Scottish international cricketer whose career for the Scottish national side spanned from 2003 to 2005. She had played 3 women's one-day internationals
