= Pamela Quin =

Scottish cricketer (born 1962)

Personal information
- Full name: Pamela Anne Quin
- Born: 18 October 1962 (age 64); Edinburgh, Midlothian
- Batting: Right-handed
- Bowling: Right-arm medium-fast
- Role: Wicket-keeper

International information
- National side: Scotland
- Only ODI (cap 13): 12 August 2001 v Netherlands
- Source: Cricinfo, 22 September 2020

Pamela Anne Quin (born 18 October 1962) is a former Scottish international cricketer whose career for the Scottish national side spanned from 2000 to 2001. She had played a women's one-day internationals She was born at Edinburgh.
