= Shona McIntyre =

Scottish cricketer (born 1980)

Personal information
- Full name: Shona Rachel McIntyre
- Born: 20 December 1980 (age 45); Edinburgh, Midlothian
- Batting: Right-handed
- Bowling: Right-arm medium-fast
- Role: Bowler

International information
- National side: Scotland (2001–2003)
- ODI debut (cap 12): 11 August 2001 v Ireland
- Last ODI: 26 July 2003 v Ireland

Career statistics
Competition	ODI
Matches	6
Runs scored	28
Batting average	7.00
100s/50s	0/0
Top score	11*
Balls bowled	194
Wickets	3
Bowling average	42.33
5 wickets in innings	0
10 wickets in match	0
Best bowling	2/15
Catches/stumpings	0/–
- Source: Cricinfo, 22 September 2020

Shona Rachel McIntyrey (born 16 December 1980) is a former Scottish international cricketer whose career for the Scottish national side spanned from 2001 to 2004. She had played 4 women's one-day internationals.

McIntyre was born at Edinburgh.
