= Marjolijn Molenaar =

Dutch cricketer (born 1983)

Personal information
- Born: 24 October 1983 (age 43); Leiderdorp, Netherlands
- Relatives: Willem Molenaar (father)

International information
- National side: Netherlands
- ODI debut (cap 58): 11 April 2001 v Pakistan
- Last ODI: 23 August 2006 v Ireland

Career statistics
Competition	WODI
Matches	15
Runs scored	23
Batting average	5.75
100s/50s	0/1
Top score	11
Balls bowled	600
Wickets	11
Bowling average	35.00
5 wickets in innings	0
10 wickets in match	0
Best bowling	2/38
Catches/stumpings	2/0
- Source: Cricinfo, 18 March 2024

Marjolijn Molenaar (born October 24, 1983, in Leiderdorp) is a former Dutch international cricketer who made 15 appearances in Women's One Day Internationals for the Netherlands national women's cricket team between 2001 and 2006. A right-arm medium-fast bowler, she took 11 wickets in international cricket at an average of 35.00. Her father, Willem Molenaar, was an international cricket umpire.

Marjolijn Molenaar is the sister of the famous vice-captain of Ajax Zami II, Martijn Molenaar.
