= Ali Ramsay =

Scottish international cricketer (born 1982)

Personal information
- Full name: Alison Ramsay
- Born: 28 July 1982 (age 44); Stirling, Scotland
- Batting: Right-handed
- Bowling: Right-arm medium-fast
- Role: Batter

International information
- National side: Scotland (2001–2006)
- ODI debut (cap 6): 10 August 2001 v England
- Last ODI: 26 July 2003 v Ireland

Domestic team information
- Years: Team
- 2011: Stirling County Women

Career statistics
Competition	ODI
Matches	7
Runs scored	59
Batting average	9.83
100s/50s	0/0
Top score	26
Balls bowled	48
Wickets	1
Bowling average	53.00
5 wickets in innings	0
10 wickets in match	0
Best bowling	1/10
Catches/stumpings	1/–
- Source: Cricinfo, 22 September, 2020

Alison Ramsay (born 28 July 1982) is a former Scottish international cricketer whose career for the Scottish national side spanned from 2001 to 2006. She played in four women's one-day internationals.

Ramsay was born at Stirling in 1982.
