= Women's Cricket World Cup Qualifier =

International cricket tournament

- Administrator: International Cricket Council
- Format: Women's One Day International
- First edition: 2003
- Latest edition: 2025
- Current champion: Pakistan (1st title)
- Most successful: India; Ireland; West Indies; South Africa; Pakistan (1 each)

The ICC Women's Cricket World Cup Qualifier is an international cricket tournament that serves as the final step of the qualification process for the Women's Cricket World Cup.

The Women's World Cup was first held in 1973, and for the first seven editions participation was determined solely by invitation, issued at the discretion of the International Women's Cricket Council (IWCC). A qualification tournament was first held in 2003 (for the 2005 World Cup), which was hosted by the Netherlands and won by Ireland. Subsequent tournaments have been held in 2008, hosted by South Africa and won by Pakistan; in 2011, hosted by Bangladesh and won by the West Indies; in 2017, hosted by Sri Lanka and won by India; the abandoned 2021 edition hosted by Zimbabwe; and the 2025 edition hosted by Pakistan.

The inaugural event in 2003 was organised by the IWCC and branded as the IWCC Trophy. The IWCC was subsumed by the International Cricket Council (ICC) in 2005, and all other editions have been known simply as the World Cup Qualifier. The number of teams and qualifying places has varied at each tournament – in 2003, six teams competed for two qualifying spots, while at the next edition (in 2008) eight teams contested two qualifying spots. The 2011 event, as well as 2021, saw ten teams compete for three qualifying places, and the 2017 tournament featured ten teams and four qualifying places. The 2011 and 2017 editions were also used to determine Women's ODI status, and the 2021 edition was originally intended to also decide entry to an expanded ICC Women's Championship; due to its abandonment, it was ultimately decided by rankings instead. The 2025 edition reverted to the same format as the 2003 edition.

== Results ==
Year	Host(s)	Final venue	Final		
Year	Host(s)	Final venue	Winner	Result	Runner-up
2003	Netherlands	no final	Ireland; 10 points	Ireland won on points table	West Indies; 8 points
2008	South Africa	Stellenbosch	South Africa; 62/2 (13.4 overs)	South Africa won by 8 wickets scorecard	Pakistan; 61 (24.3 overs)
2011	Bangladesh	Dhaka	West Indies; 250/5 (50 overs)	West Indies won by 130 runs scorecard	Pakistan; 120 (37.3 overs)
2017	Sri Lanka	Colombo	India; 245/9 (50 overs)	India won by 1 wicket scorecard	South Africa; 244 (49.4 overs)
2021	Zimbabwe	Harare	Tournament abruptly ended due to COVID-19 pandemic		
2025	Pakistan	no final	Pakistan; 10 points	Pakistan won on points table	Bangladesh; 6 points

== Performance by team ==
Legend

- 1st – Champions
- 2nd – Runners-up
- 3rd – Third place
- Q – Qualified
- § – Team qualified for tournament, but withdrew or disqualified later
- × – Did not participate, already qualified for World Cup
- ×× – No further participation due to COVID-19
- — Hosts
- Teams that qualified for the World Cup in a particular year are underlined

Team	(Netherlands) 2003 (6)	(South Africa) 2008 (8)	(Bangladesh) 2011 (10)	(Sri Lanka) 2017 (10)	(Zimbabwe) 2021 (10)	(Pakistan) 2025 (6)	Total
Africa
South Africa	×	1st	4th	2nd	×	×	3
Zimbabwe	—	5th	10th	8th	××	—	4
Americas
Bermuda	—	8th	—	—	—	—	1
United States	—	—	8th	—	××	—	2
West Indies	2nd	×	1st	×	××	3rd	3
Asia
Bangladesh	—	—	5th	5th	××	2nd	3
India	×	×	×	1st	×	×	1
Pakistan	4th	2nd	2nd	4th	××	1st	4
Sri Lanka	×	×	3rd	3rd	××	×	3
Thailand	—	—	—	9th	××	6th	2
Europe
Ireland	1st	3rd	6th	6th	××	5th	5
Netherlands	3rd	4th	7th	—	××	—	4
Scotland	5th	6th	—	7th	—	4th	3
East Asia - Pacific
Japan	6th	—	9th	—	—	—	2
Papua New Guinea	—	7th	—	10th	§	—	3

== See also ==
- Cricket World Cup Qualifier (men's)
- Women's World Twenty20 Qualifier
