= Linda Spence =

Irish-born Scottish cricketer (born 1966)

Personal information
- Full name: Linda Isobel Spence
- Born: 21 July 1966 (age 60); Dublin, Ireland
- Batting: Right-handed
- Bowling: Right-arm offbreak
- Role: All-rounder

International information
- National side: Scotland (2001–2003)
- ODI debut (cap 8): 10 August 2001 v England
- Last ODI: 23 July 2003 v West Indies

Domestic team information
- Years: Team
- 1998: Northumberland Women

Career statistics
Competition	ODI
Matches	6
Runs scored	78
Batting average	13.00
100s/50s	0/0
Top score	23
Balls bowled	61
Wickets	3
Bowling average	21.00
5 wickets in innings	0
10 wickets in match	0
Best bowling	2/29
Catches/stumpings	2/–
- Source: Cricinfo, 22 September 2020

Linda Isobel Spence (born 21 July 1966) is a former Irish born Scottish international cricketer whose career for the Scottish national side spanned from 2001 to 2003. She had played 6 women's one-day internationals.

Spence was born in Dublin in 1966.
