= Japan women's national cricket team =

Japan
- Association: Japan Cricket Association

International Cricket Council
- ICC status: Associate member (2005); Affiliate member (1989)
- ICC region: Asia / East Asia-Pacific
ICC Rankings	Current	Best-ever
T20I	41st	26th (7 October 2019)

One Day Internationals
- First ODI: v Pakistan at Sportpark Drieburg, Amsterdam; 21 July 2003
- Last ODI: v West Indies at VRA Cricket Ground, Amstelveen; 26 July 2003
ODIs	Played	Won/Lost
Total	5	0/5 (0 ties, 0 no results)
- Women's World Cup Qualifier appearances: 2 (first in 2003)
- Best result: 6th (2003)

T20 Internationals
- First T20I: v Indonesia at Independence Park, Port Vila; 6 May 2019
- Last T20I: v India at Kōrogi Athletic Park, Nisshin; 18 September 2026
T20Is	Played	Won/Lost
Total	62	29/32 (1 tie, 0 no results)
This year	8	4/4 (0 ties, 0 no results)
- T20 World Cup Qualifier appearances: 1 (first in 2013)
- Best result: 7th (2013)
T20I first kit
T20I second kit
- As of 18 September 2026

The Japan women's national cricket team represents Japan in international women's cricket matches.

In April 2018, the International Cricket Council (ICC) decided to grant full Women's Twenty20 International (WT20I) status to all its members. Therefore, all Twenty20 matches played between Japan women and other ICC members since 1 July 2018 have the full WT20I status.

== History ==
Japan's women's national team made their international debut at the 2003 IWCC Trophy in the Netherlands. These were the first One Day International (ODI) matches played by any Japanese team, with the Japanese men's team yet to play at that level. They did not meet with much success though, losing all five matches and giving away an incredible 104 extras in their match against The Netherlands. They were bowled out for just 28 against Pakistan in that competition, with 20 of those runs coming in extras and just 8 from the bat, with the openers top scoring with 3 runs apiece. They are yet to play any WODI after this tournament.

Their return to international level did not come until September 2006 when they faced Papua New Guinea in a three-match one-day series to decide which country would represent the East Asia/Pacific region in the World Cup Qualifier in Ireland in 2007. Japan showed some improvement from the IWCC Trophy, but still lost all three games. However, these matches were also not considered as WODIs.

In December 2020, the ICC announced the qualification pathway for the 2023 ICC Women's T20 World Cup. Japan were named in the 2021 ICC Women's T20 World Cup EAP Qualifier regional group, alongside seven other teams.

In January 2023 it was announced that Japan and Indonesia would be included in Asian Cricket Council (ACC) pathway events, while remaining in the ICC East Asia-Pacific development region.

== Tournament history ==
=== ICC Women's World Cup ===
World Cup record
Year	Round	Position	GP	W	L	T	NR
(England) 1973	Did not qualify						
(India) 1978	Did not qualify						
(New Zealand) 1982	Did not qualify						
(Australia) 1988	Did not qualify						
(England) 1993	Did not qualify						
(India) 1997	Did not qualify						
(New Zealand) 2000	Did not qualify						
(South Africa) 2005	Did not qualify						
(Australia) 2009	Did not qualify						
(India) 2013	Did not qualify						
(England) 2017	Did not qualify						
(New Zealand) 2022	Did not qualify						
(India) 2025	Did not qualify						
Total	0/12	0 Titles	0	0	0	0	0

=== ICC Women's World T20 ===
ICC Women's T20 World Cup records
Year	Round	Position	GP	W	L	T	NR
(England) 2009	Did not qualify						
(Cricket West Indies) 2010	Did not qualify						
(Sri Lanka) 2012	Did not qualify						
(Bangladesh) 2014	Did not qualify						
(India) 2016	Did not qualify						
(Cricket West Indies) 2018	Did not qualify						
(Australia) 2020	Did not qualify						
(South Africa) 2023	Did not qualify						
(United Arab Emirates) 2024	Did not qualify						
(England) 2026	Did not qualify						
Total	0/10	0 Titles	0	0	0	0	0

=== ICC Women's Cricket World Cup Qualifier ===
ICC Women's Cricket World Cup Qualifier records
Host Year	Round	Position	GP	W	L	T	NR
(Netherlands) 2003	Round-robin	5/6	5	0	5	0	0
(South Africa) 2008	Did not participate						
(Bangladesh) 2011	Did not qualify	9/10	4	0	4	0	0
(Sri Lanka) 2017	Did not qualify in to the qualifiers round						
(Zimbabwe) 2021	Did not qualify in to the qualifiers round						
(Pakistan) 2025	Did not qualify in to the qualifiers round						
Total	2/6	0 Title	9	0	9	0	0

=== ICC Women's T20 World Cup Global Qualifier ===
ICC Women's T20 World Cup Qualifier records
Year	Round	Position	GP	W	L	T	NR
(Republic of Ireland) 2013	Group stages	7/8	5	0	4	0	1
(Thailand) 2015	Did not qualify into the qualifiers round						
(Netherlands) 2018	Did not qualify into the qualifiers round						
(Scotland) 2019	Did not qualify into the qualifiers round						
(United Arab Emirates) 2022	Did not qualify into the qualifiers round						
(United Arab Emirates) 2024	Did not qualify into the qualifiers round						
(Nepal) 2026	Did not qualify into the qualifiers round						
Total	1/7	0 Title	5	0	4	0	1

=== ICC Women's Twenty20 World Cup East Asia Pacific Qualifier ===
EAP Women's Twenty20 World Cup Qualifier records
Year	Round	Position	GP	W	L	T	NR
(Vanuatu) 2019	Runners-up	5/6	5	1	4	0	0
(Samoa) 2021	The tournament had been cancelled due to the COVID-19 pandemic						
(Vanuatu) 2023	Round-robin	4/7	6	3	3	0	0
(Fiji) 2025	4th-place	4/8	5	2	3	0	0
Total	3/3	0 Titles	16	6	10	0	0

=== Cricket at Summer Olympics Games ===
Cricket at Summer Olympics records
Host Year	Round	Position	GP	W	L	T	NR
(United States) 2028	To be determined						
(Australia) 2032	To be determined						
Total	–	0 Title	0	0	0	0	0

=== ICC Women's T20 Champions Trophy ===
ICC Women's T20 Champions Trophy records
Host Year	Round	Position	GP	W	L	T	NR
(Sri Lanka) 2027	To be determined						
2031	To be determined						
Total	–	0 Title	0	0	0	0	0

=== Asian Games ===
Cricket at the Asian Games records
Year	Round	Position	GP	W	L	T	NR
(China) 2010	Bronze medal	(bronze) 3rd	5	3	2	0	0
(South Korea) 2014	Quarter-finals	5th	1	0	1	0	0
(China) 2022	Did not participate						
(Japan) 2026	To be determined						
Total	2/3	0 Titles	6	3	3	0	0

=== ACC Women's Premier Cup ===
ACC Women's Premier Cup record
Year	Round	Position	GP	W	L	T	NR
2024 (Malaysia)	Quarter-finals	–	4	2	2	0	0
Total	1/1	0 Titles	4	2	2	0	0

=== Women's Twenty20 East Asia Cup ===
Women's Twenty20 East Asia Cup record
Year	Round	Position	GP	W	L	T	NR
(South Korea) 2015	3rd place	3/4	4	2	2	0	0
(Hong Kong) 2017	Runners-up	2/4	4	2	1	0	1
(South Korea) 2019	3rd place	3/4	4	3	1	0	0
(South Korea) 2022	Round-robin	–	4	0	4	0	0
(China) 2023	3rd place	3/3	4	1	3	0	0
(South Korea) 2024	Runner-up	2/5	5	3	2	0	0
Total	6/6	0 Titles	25	11	13	0	1

== Honours ==
=== Others ===
- Asian Games
  - Bronze Medal (1): 2010

== Records ==
International Match Summary – Japan women

Last updated 18 September 2026

Playing Record
Format	M	W	L	T	NR	Inaugural Match
One Day Internationals	5	0	5	0	0	21 July 2003
Twenty20 Internationals	62	29	32	1	0	6 May 2019

=== Women's One-Day International ===
- Highest team total: 85 v Scotland on 25 July 2003 at Sportpark Klein Zwitserland, The Hague.
- Highest individual innings: 18, Ema Kuribayashi v Scotland on 25 July 2003 at Sportpark Klein Zwitserland, The Hague.
- Best innings bowling: 2/6, Yūko Sasaki v Scotland on 25 July 2003 at Sportpark Klein Zwitserland, The Hague.

ODI record versus other nations

Records complete to WODI #450. Last updated 26 July 2003.

Opponent	M	W	L	T	NR	First match	First win
ICC Full members
Ireland	1	0	1	0	0	22 July 2003	
Pakistan	1	0	1	0	0	21 July 2003	
West Indies	1	0	1	0	0	26 July 2003	
ICC Associate members
Netherlands	1	0	1	0	0	23 July 2003	
Scotland	1	0	1	0	0	25 July 2003	

=== Women's Twenty20 International ===
- Highest team total: 158/4 v. Philippines on 12 September 2025 at Albert Park Ground 2, Suva.
- Highest individual innings: 67, Mai Yanagida v. Indonesia on 15 September 2025 at Albert Park Ground 2, Suva.
- Best innings bowling: 5/6, Erika Toguchi-Quinn v. Fiji on 6 September 2025 at Albert Park Ground 1, Suva.

Most T20I runs for Japan Women

Player	Runs	Average	Career span
Erika Oda	807	17.93	2019–2026
Mai Yanagida	777	15.85	2019–2026
Haruna Iwasaki	429	10.72	2022–2026
Ahilya Chandel	407	12.33	2022–2026
Akari Nishimura	392	10.31	2019–2026

Most T20I wickets for Japan Women

Player	Wickets	Average	Career span
Ahilya Chandel	41	19.12	2022–2026
Erika Toguchi-Quinn	35	12.97	2022–2026
Nonoha Yasumoto	35	13.82	2023–2026
Ayumi Fujikawa	29	17.86	2022–2026
Mai Yanagida	27	15.62	2019–2026

T20I record versus other nations

Records complete to WT20I #3021. Last updated 18 September 2026.

Opponent	M	W	L	T	NR	First match	First win
ICC Full members
India	1	0	1	0	0	18 September 2026	
ICC Associate members
Bahrain	1	1	0	0	0	7 June 2026	7 June 2026
China	6	4	2	0	0	21 September 2019	26 May 2023
Cook Islands	1	1	0	0	0	1 September 2023	1 September 2023
Fiji	4	4	0	0	0	9 May 2019	9 May 2019
Hong Kong	13	2	10	1	0	20 September 2019	20 September 2019
Indonesia	3	0	3	0	0	6 May 2019	
Malaysia	3	1	2	0	0	14 February 2024	13 September 2026
Mongolia	2	2	0	0	0	11 October 2024	11 October 2024
Myanmar	1	1	0	0	0	6 June 2026	6 June 2026
Nepal	2	0	2	0	0	18 November 2023	
Oman	1	1	0	0	0	10 February 2024	10 February 2024
Papua New Guinea	3	0	3	0	0	9 May 2019	
Philippines	2	2	0	0	0	7 June 2025	7 June 2025
Samoa	3	2	1	0	0	7 May 2019	2 September 2023
Singapore	5	5	0	0	0	1 October 2024	1 October 2024
South Korea	3	3	0	0	0	19 September 2019	19 September 2019
Tanzania	1	0	1	0	0	16 November 2023	
Thailand	1	0	1	0	0	9 June 2026	
United Arab Emirates	1	0	1	0	0	13 February 2024	
Vanuatu	5	0	5	0	0	10 May 2019	

== Current squad ==
Updated on 14 February 2024.

This lists all the players who were part of the 2024 ACC Women's Premier Cup squad.

Name	Age	Batting style	Bowling style	Notes
Batters
Mai Yanagida	33	Right-handed	Right-arm off break	Captain
Erika Oda	39	Right-handed		
Hinase Goto	21	Right-handed	Right-arm medium	
Haruna Iwasaki	24	Right-handed	Right-arm medium	
Seika Sumi		Right-handed	Right-arm medium	
All-rounders
Ahilya Chandel	23	Left-handed	Left-arm medium	
Kurumi Ota	39	Left-handed	Right-arm medium	
Shimako Kato	23	Right-handed	Right-arm medium	
Meg Ogawa	24	Right-handed	Right-arm medium	
Wicketkeeper
Akari Nishimura	28	Right-handed	-	
Spin Bowler
Erika Toguchi-Quinn	25	Right-handed	Right-arm leg break	
Pace Bowlers
Nonoha Yasumoto		Left-handed	Left-arm medium	
Ayumi Fujikawa	22	Right-handed	Right-arm medium	
Elena Kusuda-Nairn	31	Right-handed	Right-arm medium	

== See also ==
- List of Japan women ODI cricketers
- List of Japan women Twenty20 International cricketers
- Cricket in Japan
