= 2005 Women's Cricket World Cup squads =

Eight teams participated in the 2005 Women's Cricket World Cup in South Africa, the same as at the previous edition in 2000. The only change in composition was that the West Indies qualified in place of the Netherlands.

== Key ==
Table headings
Bowling styles
Player notes
- Bat – Handedness when batting
- Bowl – Bowling style
- GP – Games played
- R – Runs scored
- A – Batting average
- W – Wickets taken
- E – Economy rate
- C – Catches
- S – Stumpings
- LM – Left-arm medium
- LF – Left-arm fast
- LFM – Left-arm fast-medium
- LMF – Left-arm medium-fast
- LB – Leg break
- LBG – Leg break googly
- RM – Right-arm medium
- RF – Right-arm fast
- RFM – Right-arm fast-medium
- RMF – Right-arm medium-fast
- SLA – Slow left-arm orthodox
- OB – Off break
- (c) – Captain
- (vc) – Vice-captain
- † – Wicket-keeper
- ^{W} – Withdrawn player (non-sortable)

== Australia ==
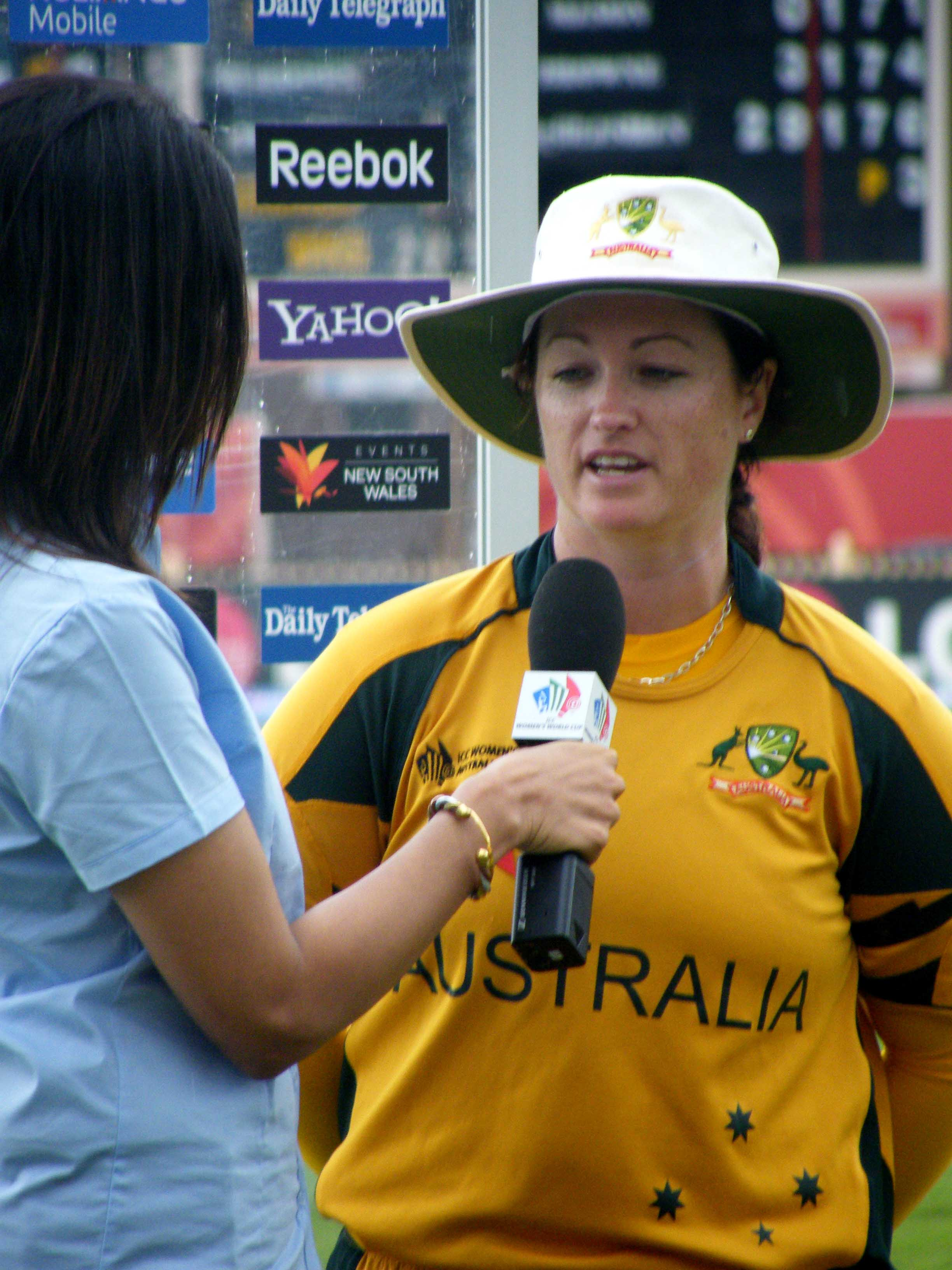
Karen Rolton was Australia's leading run-scorer during the competition, accruing 246 runs.

Australian squad for the 2005 Women's Cricket World Cup
Player	Date of birth	Bat	Bowl	GP	R	A	W	E	C	S
Alex Blackwell	31 August 1983 (aged 21)	Right	RM	7	67	33.50	1	4.00	0	0
Kate Blackwell	31 August 1983 (aged 21)	Right	RM	3	5	5.00	–	–	2	0
Louise Broadfoot	26 February 1978 (aged 27)	Right	LBG	2	21	21.00	2	1.81	0	0
Belinda Clark (c)	10 September 1970 (aged 34)	Right	OB	7	156	31.20	–	–	2	0
Cathryn Fitzpatrick	4 March 1968 (aged 37)	Right	RF	7	62	31.00	10	2.55	0	0
Julie Hayes	2 May 1973 (aged 31)	Right	RM	7	5	5.00	8	2.71	0	0
Mel Jones	11 August 1972 (aged 32)	Right	RM	7	82	16.40	–	–	1	0
Lisa Keightley	26 August 1971 (aged 33)	Right	RM	7	198	33.00	0	5.50	1	0
Emma Liddell	30 March 1980 (aged 24)	Right	LM	6	0	–	7	2.96	1	0
Shelley Nitschke	3 December 1976 (aged 28)	Left	SLA	6	1	1.00	11	2.06	4	0
Julia Price †	11 January 1972 (aged 33)	Right	–	8	27	27.00	–	–	6	4
Karen Rolton	21 November 1974 (aged 30)	Left	LM	7	246	61.50	10	2.46	3	0
Clea Smith	6 January 1979 (aged 26)	Right	RM	6	1	–	4	1.86	2	0
Lisa Sthalekar	13 August 1979 (aged 25)	Right	OB	8	165	41.25	8	3.39	1	0

== England ==
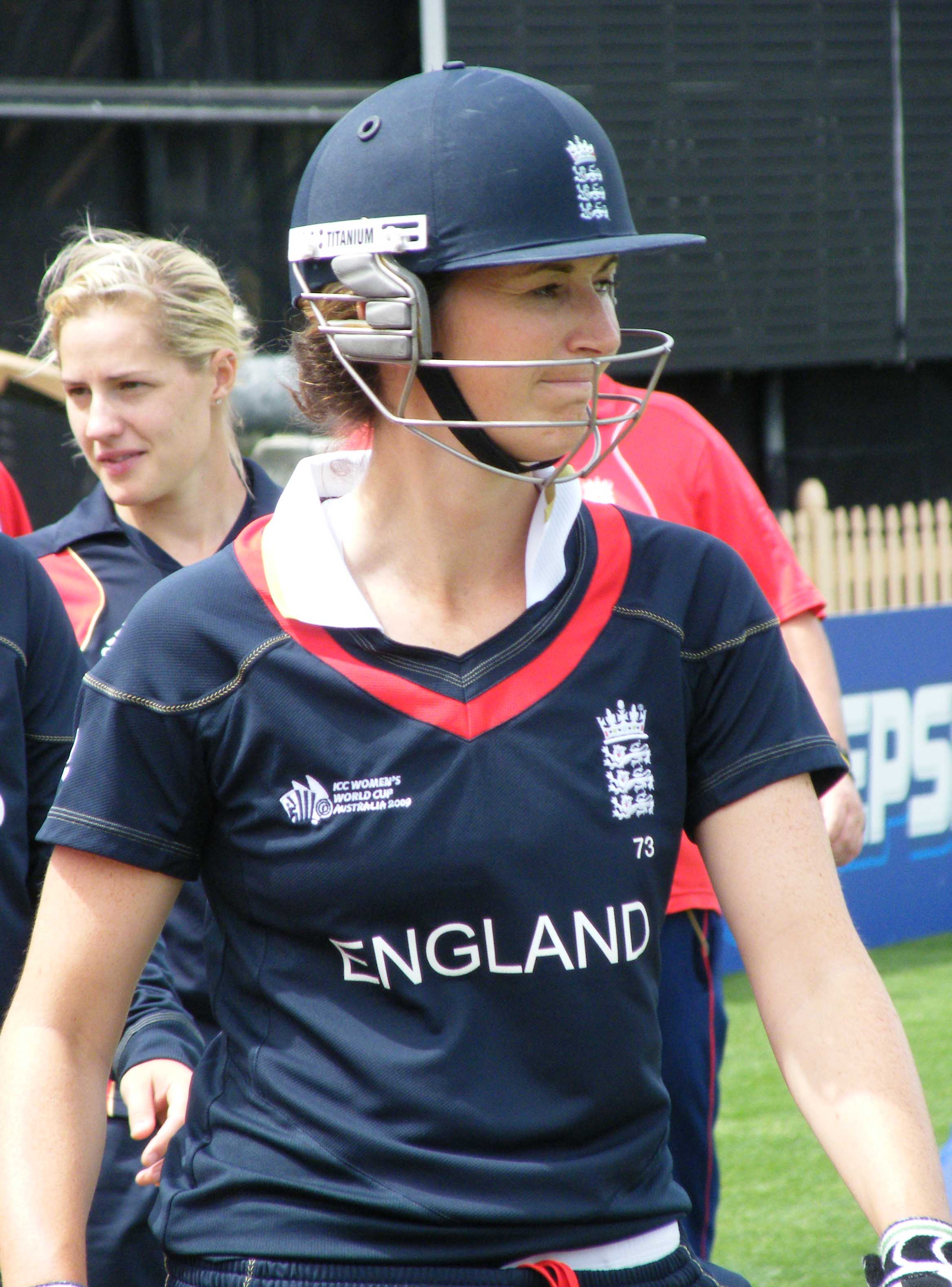
Charlotte Edwards was the leading run-scorer during the competition, accruing 280 runs.

English squad for the 2005 Women's Cricket World Cup
Player	Date of birth	Bat	Bowl	GP	R	A	W	E	C	S
Rosalie Birch	6 December 1983 (aged 21)	Right	OB	6	36	9.00	3	3.35	0	0
Arran Brindle	23 November 1981 (aged 23)	Right	RM	6	186	62.00	0	4.00	3	0
Katherine Brunt	2 July 1985 (aged 19)	Right	RMF	5	10	10.00	2	3.06	0	0
Clare Connor (c)	1 September 1976 (aged 28)	Right	SLA	7	186	37.20	4	2.37	0	0
Charlotte Edwards	17 December 1979 (aged 25)	Right	LB	6	280	46.66	–	–	2	0
Lydia Greenway	6 August 1985 (aged 19)	Left	OB	4	29	9.66	–	–	0	0
Isa Guha	21 May 1985 (aged 19)	Right	RFM	4	13	13.00	4	2.95	1	0
Jenny Gunn	9 May 1986 (aged 18)	Right	RMF	6	58	29.00	5	3.55	0	0
Beth Morgan	27 September 1981 (aged 23)	Right	RMF	0	–	–	–	–	–	–
Laura Newton	27 November 1977 (aged 27)	Right	RM	7	105	15.00	–	–	0	0
Lucy Pearson	19 February 1972 (aged 33)	Right	LF	6	1	1.00	6	2.61	0	0
Nicky Shaw	30 December 1981 (aged 23)	Right	RFM	5	25	6.25	3	3.44	1	0
Jane Smit †	24 December 1972 (aged 32)	Right	–	7	15	7.50	–	–	4	2
Claire Taylor †	25 September 1975 (aged 29)	Right	–	6	265	53.00	–	–	1	0
Clare Taylor	22 May 1965 (aged 39)	Right	RM	2	29	29.00	2	2.20	0	0

== India ==
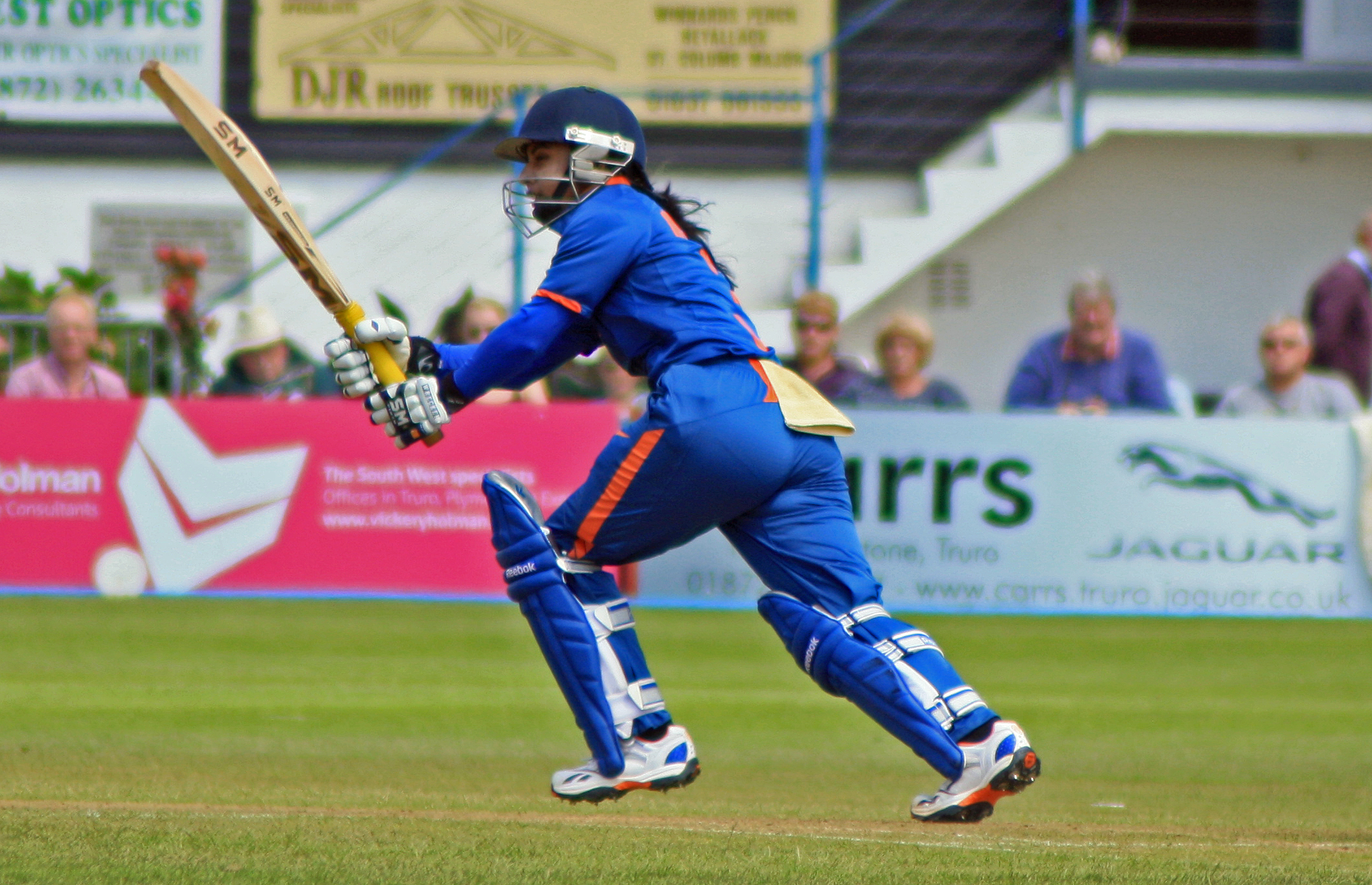
Mithali Raj was India's leading run-scorer during the competition, accruing 199 runs.

Indian squad for the 2005 Women's Cricket World Cup
Player	Date of birth	Bat	Bowl	GP	R	A	W	E	C	S
Nooshin Al Khadeer	13 February 1981 (aged 24)	Right	OB	8	3	3.00	11	3.02	1	0
Anjum Chopra	20 May 1977 (aged 27)	Left	RM	8	180	36.00	–	–	2	0
Neetu David	1 September 1977 (aged 27)	Right	SLA	8	1	0.50	20	2.54	1	0
Rumeli Dhar	9 December 1983 (aged 21)	Right	RM	8	101	33.66	3	3.63	5	0
Jhulan Goswami	25 November 1982 (aged 22)	Right	RM	8	34	17.00	13	2.74	2	0
Anju Jain †	11 August 1974 (aged 30)	Right	–	8	155	31.00	–	–	9	8
Karu Jain †	9 September 1985 (aged 19)	Right	–	0	–	–	–	–	–	–
Hemlata Kala	15 August 1975 (aged 29)	Right	RM	8	39	13.00	–	–	0	0
Arundhati Kirkire †	31 May 1980 (aged 24)	Right	RM	0	–	–	–	–	–	–
Reema Malhotra	17 October 1980 (aged 24)	Right	LB	0	–	–	–	–	–	–
Deepa Marathe	25 November 1972 (aged 32)	Right	SLA	8	8	4.00	6	2.70	1	0
Mithali Raj (c)	3 December 1982 (aged 22)	Right	LB	8	199	49.75	–	–	1	0
Amita Sharma	12 September 1982 (aged 22)	Right	RMF	8	27	9.00	14	3.17	1	0
Jaya Sharma	17 September 1980 (aged 24)	Left	RM	8	68	9.71	–	–	1	0

== Ireland ==
Irish squad for the 2005 Women's Cricket World Cup
Player	Date of birth	Bat	Bowl	GP	R	A	W	E	C	S
Emma Beamish	29 November 1982 (aged 22)	Right	RMF	5	18	4.50	–	–	0	0
Caitriona Beggs †	15 July 1977 (aged 27)	Right	RM	6	78	19.50	–	–	0	0
Una Budd	28 October 1975 (aged 29)	Right	–	6	43	8.60	–	–	0	0
Nicola Coffey	27 May 1982 (aged 22)	Right	LMF	6	18	3.60	2	5.63	1	0
Jo Day †	4 September 1975 (aged 29)	Right	–	0	–	–	–	–	–	–
Miriam Grealey	27 December 1965 (aged 39)	Right	OB	6	85	17.00	2	4.53	0	0
Marianne Herbert	2 December 1981 (aged 23)	Right	RMF	2	0	0.00	0	5.66	0	0
Cecelia Joyce	25 July 1983 (aged 21)	Right	LB	4	45	15.00	0	9.00	0	0
Anne Linehan †	7 October 1973 (aged 31)	Left	RM	4	25	8.33	–	–	5	1
Barbara McDonald	28 May 1972 (aged 32)	Right	RMF	6	18	6.00	4	3.34	0	0
Clare Shillington (c)	8 January 1981 (aged 24)	Right	OB	6	39	7.80	–	–	1	0
Jillian Smythe	19 December 1985 (aged 19)	Right	RMF	4	13	4.33	0	5.59	0	0
Heather Whelan	8 October 1977 (aged 27)	Right	RMF	6	14	14.00	4	4.47	0	0
Jill Whelan	28 December 1986 (aged 18)	Right	RM	5	2	–	3	4.10	0	0

== New Zealand ==
New Zealand squad for the 2005 Women's Cricket World Cup
Player	Date of birth	Bat	Bowl	GP	R	A	W	E	C	S
Nicola Browne	14 September 1983 (aged 21)	Right	RM	7	31	7.75	4	3.22	3	0
Sarah Burke	2 January 1982 (aged 23)	Right	RM	1	–	–	0	2.00	0	0
Anna Corbin	24 October 1980 (aged 24)	Right	OB	5	14	7.00	3	2.57	0	0
Emily Drumm	15 September 1974 (aged 30)	Right	RM / LB	2	42	42.00	–	–	0	0
Maria Fahey	5 March 1984 (aged 21)	Left	OB	6	114	38.00	–	–	0	0
Maia Lewis (c)	20 July 1970 (aged 34)	Right	–	7	189	31.50	–	–	2	0
Aimee Mason	11 October 1982 (aged 22)	Left	OB	4	93	31.00	0	3.93	2	0
Sara McGlashan †	28 March 1982 (aged 22)	Right	–	6	120	30.00	–	–	2	0
Louise Milliken	19 September 1983 (aged 21)	Right	RFM	6	7	3.50	11	3.43	4	0
Rachel Pullar	3 June 1977 (aged 27)	Right	RFM	6	51	10.20	10	2.37	0	0
Rebecca Rolls †	22 August 1975 (aged 29)	Right	–	7	121	20.16	–	–	13	1
Natalee Scripps	9 December 1978 (aged 26)	Right	RM	3	–	–	4	3.06	0	0
Rebecca Steele	2 January 1985 (aged 20)	Right	LM / SLA	4	6	6.00	3	2.04	0	0
Haidee Tiffen	4 September 1979 (aged 25)	Right	RM	7	89	17.80	–	–	1	0
Helen Watson	17 February 1972 (aged 33)	Right	RM	6	44	14.66	6	3.49	2	0

== South Africa ==
South African squad for the 2005 Women's Cricket World Cup
Player	Date of birth	Bat	Bowl	GP	R	A	W	E	C	S
Susan Benade	16 February 1982 (aged 23)	Right	RMF	2	21	10.50	–	–	1	0
Cri-Zelda Brits	20 November 1983 (aged 21)	Right	RMF	6	206	34.33	5	5.19	1	0
Lonell de Beer	12 June 1980 (aged 24)	Right	LB	4	5	2.50	1	3.73	0	0
Shandre Fritz	21 July 1985 (aged 19)	Right	RM	6	114	19.00	2	4.90	3	0
Alison Hodgkinson (c)	30 January 1977 (aged 28)	Right	LB	6	78	15.60	–	–	1	0
Ashlyn Kilowan	19 December 1982 (aged 22)	Left	LM	6	48	16.00	2	4.45	0	0
Johmari Logtenberg	22 February 1989 (aged 16)	Right	RM	6	98	16.33	2	5.50	0	0
Nolu Ndzundzu	21 December 1977 (aged 27)	Right	RM	2	4	–	0	3.62	0	0
Shafeeqa Pillay †	11 February 1985 (aged 20)	Left	RM	4	16	8.00	–	–	3	0
Tamara Reeves	17 April 1982 (aged 22)	Right	RM	2	6	3.00	–	–	1	0
Alicia Smith	13 March 1984 (aged 21)	Right	RFM	6	63	10.50	9	3.08	0	0
Angelique Taai	31 March 1987 (aged 17)	Right	RMF	2	3	1.50	0	2.47	0	0
Claire Terblanche	20 October 1984 (aged 20)	Right	OB	4	62	31.00	–	–	1	0
Daleen Terblanche	19 October 1969 (aged 35)	Right	OB	4	68	17.00	–	–	0	0
Charlize van der Westhuizen	17 February 1984 (aged 21)	Right	SLA	6	37	9.25	3	3.00	2	0

== Sri Lanka ==
Sri Lankan squad for the 2005 Women's Cricket World Cup
Player	Date of birth	Bat	Bowl	GP	R	A	W	E	C	S
Suwini de Alwis	17 May 1975 (aged 29)	Left	SLA	6	86	14.33	5	4.80	1	0
Sandamali Dolawatta (c)	10 February 1983 (aged 22)	Right	LB	6	18	3.00	1	3.81	1	0
Thanuga Ekanayake †	26 September 1974 (aged 30)	Right	–	6	5	2.50	–	–	1	1
Hiruka Fernando	30 September 1976 (aged 28)	Left	SLA	6	155	31.00	–	–	0	0
Inoka Galagedara	17 July 1977 (aged 27)	Right	RFM	5	3	0.60	1	5.00	1	0
Thalika Gunaratne	9 March 1975 (aged 30)	Right	SLA	2	1	1.00	0	9.00	0	0
Janakanthy Mala	1 June 1984 (aged 20)	Right	OB	6	26	4.33	2	3.25	1	0
Eshani Kaushalya	1 June 1984 (aged 20)	Right	RM	6	20	3.33	1	4.92	0	0
Chamari Polgampola	20 March 1981 (aged 24)	Left	RMF	6	31	5.16	0	4.57	0	0
Michel Pereira †	12 August 1982 (aged 22)	Left	–	0	–	–	–	–	–	–
Dedunu Silva	12 February 1978 (aged 27)	Right	RM	5	22	4.40	–	–	0	0
Shashikala Siriwardene	14 February 1985 (aged 20)	Right	OB	6	105	17.50	1	4.03	1	0
Praba Udawatte	4 October 1980 (aged 24)	Right	RM	6	19	3.16	5	3.36	2	0
Sripali Weerakkody	7 January 1986 (aged 19)	Left	RM	0	–	–	–	–	–	–

== West Indies ==
West Indian squad for the 2005 Women's Cricket World Cup
Player	Date of birth	Bat	Bowl	GP	R	A	W	E	C	S
Felicia Cummings	20 February 1968 (aged 37)	Right	SLA	3	1	–	2	3.62	0	0
Shane de Silva	22 September 1972 (aged 32)	Left	SLA	6	40	13.33	2	6.10	1	0
Verena Felicien	12 November 1964 (aged 40)	Right	OB	6	42	14.00	9	3.35	0	0
Nadine George †	15 October 1968 (aged 36)	Left	–	6	72	12.00	–	–	1	0
Indomatie Goordial-John	9 August 1985 (aged 19)	Right	OB	1	8	8.00	1	5.28	0	0
Cordel Jack	22 February 1982 (aged 23)	Right	OB	2	1	1.00	1	3.00	0	0
Pamela Lavine	12 March 1969 (aged 36)	Right	RF	6	145	48.33	2	3.90	0	0
Debbie-Ann Lewis	7 August 1969 (aged 35)	Right	RM	6	3	1.00	6	3.31	3	0
Anisa Mohammed	7 August 1988 (aged 16)	Right	OB	1	–	–	1	2.50	0	0
Juliana Nero	14 June 1979 (aged 25)	Right	RM	6	197	49.25	–	–	3	0
Stephanie Power (c)†	19 April 1957 (aged 47)	Right	–	6	14	4.66	–	–	5	3
Philipa Thomas	20 September 1968 (aged 36)	Right	RF	6	23	23.00	7	3.59	2	0
Envis Williams	8 October 1962 (aged 42)	Right	RM	5	37	12.33	5	3.37	1	0
Nelly Williams	16 October 1980 (aged 24)	Right	RM	6	121	24.20	–	–	1	0
