= West Indies women's cricket team in India and Pakistan in 2003–04 =

West Indies women's cricket team in India in 2003–04
	India	West Indies
- Dates: 26 February – 12 March 2004
Captains	Mamatha Maben	Stephanie Power

One Day International series
- Results: India won the 5-match series 5–0
Most runs	Jaya Sharma (223)	Nadine George (129)
Most wickets	Neetu David (15)	Philipa Thomas (6)

The West Indies women's cricket team toured India and Pakistan between February and April 2004. They played India in five One Day Internationals, which India won 5–0. They played Pakistan in one Test match and seven One Day Internationals, with the Test ending as a draw and the West Indies winning the ODI series 5–2. The Test match was the last Test played by both Pakistan and the West Indies. Pakistan batter Kiran Baluch scored the highest ever score in Women's Test cricket, with 242 in the first innings of the Test match, which the West Indies managed to draw after being asked to follow on.

== Tour of India ==
=== Squads ===
India	West Indies
Mamatha Maben (c); Nooshin Al Khadeer; Anjum Chopra; Diana David; Neetu David; Anju Jain (wk); Karu Jain (wk); Hemlata Kala; Arundhati Kirkire; Deepa Marathe; Sunetra Paranjpe; Mithali Raj; Amita Sharma; Jaya Sharma	Stephanie Power (c) (wk); Candacy Atkins; Felicia Cummings; Verena Felicien; Doris Francis; Nadine George; Indomatie Goordial-John; Geneille Greaves; Debbie-Ann Lewis; Anisa Mohammed; Juliana Nero; Jacqueline Robinson; Philipa Thomas; Envis Williams; Nelly Williams

=== WODI Series ===
==== 1st ODI ====
26 February 2004
Scorecard

India; 298/2 (50 overs)	v	West Indies; 193 (49.5 overs)
Jaya Sharma 97 (97); Felicia Cummings 1/48 (10 overs)		Nadine George 53 (35); Neetu David 4/21 (9.5 overs)

India Women won by 105 runs
Tata Digwadih Stadium, Dhanbad
Player of the match: Jaya Sharma (Ind)

- West Indies Women won the toss and elected to field.
- Diana David (Ind) made her WODI debut.

==== 2nd ODI ====
29 February 2004
Scorecard

West Indies; 161 (49.4 overs)	v	India; 164/3 (41.3 overs)
Nadine George 48 (39); Neetu David 5/20 (9.4 overs)		Jaya Sharma 78 (127); Philipa Thomas 2/30 (9.3 overs)

India Women won by 7 wickets
Keenan Stadium, Jamshedpur
Umpires: Abdul Azim (Ind) and Ravi Shankar (Ind)
Player of the match: Neetu David (Ind)

- West Indies Women won the toss and elected to bat.

==== 3rd ODI ====
3 March 2004
Scorecard

India; 207/7 (50 overs)	v	West Indies; 135 (47.5 overs)
Anjum Chopra 36 (85); Philipa Thomas 3/35 (10 overs)		Nelly Williams 41 (103); Nooshin Al Khadeer 4/22 (10 overs)

India Women won by 72 runs
Eden Gardens, Kolkata
Umpires: Aniruddha Banerjee (Ind) and Aloke Bhattacharjee (Ind)
Player of the match: Nooshin Al Khadeer (Ind)

- India Women won the toss and elected to bat.

==== 4th ODI ====
6 March 2004
Scorecard

India; 236/3 (50 overs)	v	West Indies; 127 (47.4 overs)
Mithali Raj 88 (78); Indomatie Goordial-John 1/31 (8 overs)		Verena Felicien 24 (58); Neetu David 3/32 (10 overs)

India Women won by 109 runs
K. D. Singh Babu Stadium, Lucknow
Umpires: RP Singh (Ind) and Satish Gupta (Ind)
Player of the match: Mithali Raj (Ind)

- India Women won the toss and elected to bat.
- Karu Jain (Ind) made her WODI debut.

==== 5th ODI ====
12 March 2004
Scorecard

India; 256/4 (50 overs)	v	West Indies; 86 (35.4 overs)
Arundhati Kirkire 106 (118); Jacqueline Robinson 2/53 (8 overs)		Verena Felicien 19 (71); Mamantha Maben 4/23 (6 overs)

India Women won by 170 runs
Tau Devi Lal Stadium, Gurgaon
Umpires: Arun Bharadwaj (Ind) and Rajan Seth (Ind)
Player of the match: Arundhati Kirkire (Ind)

- India Women won the toss and elected to bat.

== Tour of Pakistan ==
West Indies women's cricket team in Pakistan in 2003–04
	Pakistan	West Indies
- Dates: 15 March – 2 April 2004
Captains	Shaiza Khan	Stephanie Power

Test series
- Result: 1-match series drawn 0–0
Most runs	Kiran Baluch (264)	Nadine George (140)
Most wickets	Shaiza Khan (13)	Felicia Cummings (4)

One Day International series
- Results: West Indies won the 7-match series 5–2
Most runs	Kiran Baluch (242)	Verena Felicien (167)
Most wickets	Urooj Mumtaz (11)	Verena Felicien (14)

=== Squads ===
Pakistan	West Indies
Shaiza Khan (c); Zehmarad Afzal; Mariam Agha; Mariam Anwar; Kiran Baluch; Maryam Butt; Sadia Butt; Batool Fatima (wk); Khursheed Jabeen; Shabana Latif; Urooj Mumtaz; Nazia Nazir; Sajjida Shah	Stephanie Power (c) (wk); Candacy Atkins; Felicia Cummings; Verena Felicien; Doris Francis; Nadine George; Indomatie Goordial-John; Geneille Greaves; Debbie-Ann Lewis; Anisa Mohammed; Juliana Nero; Jacqueline Robinson; Philipa Thomas; Envis Williams; Nelly Williams

=== Only Test ===
15 – 18 March 2004
Scorecard

Pakistan	v	West Indies
426/7d (166 overs); Kiran Baluch 242 (488); Felicia Cummings 4/54 (24 overs)		147 (56 overs); Verena Felicien 47 (–); Shaiza Khan 7/59 (16 overs)
58/2 (23 overs); Kiran Baluch 22 (–); Envis Williams 1/8 (4 overs)		440 (146 overs) (f/o); Nadine George 118 (185); Shaiza Khan 6/167 (55 overs)

Match drawn
National Stadium, Karachi
Umpires: Arif Ali (Pak) and Riazuddin (Pak)

- West Indies Women won the toss and elected to field.
- Mariam Anwar, Mariam Butt, Batool Fatima, Urooj Mumtaz, (Pak) Candacy Atkins, Felicia Cummings, Verena Felicien, Doris Francis, Nadine George, Indomatie Goordial-John, Geneille Greaves, Juliana Nero, Stephanie Power, Jacqueline Robinson and Envis Williams (WI) all made their WTest debuts.
- Kiran Baluch's 242 is the highest score in Women's Test cricket.

=== WODI Series ===
==== 1st ODI ====
21 March 2004
Scorecard

Pakistan; 142/8 (50 overs)	v	West Indies; 143/3 (37 overs)
Batool Fatima 36 (92); Philipa Thomas 2/30 (10 overs)		Nelly Williams 53 (112); Khursheed Jabeen 1/11 (3 overs)

West Indies Women won by 7 wickets
National Stadium, Karachi
Umpires: Islam Khan (Pak) and Shakeel Khan (Pak)

- West Indies Women won the toss and elected to field.
- Mariam Agha, Mariam Anwar and Urooj Mumtaz (Pak) all made their WODI debuts.

==== 2nd ODI ====
23 March 2004
Scorecard

West Indies; 194 (49.5 overs)	v	Pakistan; 134 (43.2 overs)
Nadine George 44 (54); Urooj Mumtaz 5/33 (10 overs)		Kiran Baluch 34 (46); Verena Felicien 3/23 (7 overs)

West Indies Women won by 60 runs
Asghar Ali Shah Cricket Stadium, Karachi
Umpires: Islam Khan (Pak) and Mohammad Dars (Pak)
Player of the match: Urooj Mumtaz (Pak)

- West Indies Women won the toss and elected to bat.

==== 3rd ODI ====
25 March 2004
Scorecard

Pakistan; 160/9 (50 overs)	v	West Indies; 140 (47.2 overs)
Shaiza Khan 30* (41); Envis Williams 2/24 (10 overs)		Nadine George 34 (47); Shaiza Khan 4/24 (9 overs)

Pakistan Women won by 20 runs
Karachi Gymkhana, Karachi
Umpires: Feroze Butt (Pak) and Rooh-ul-Hasan (Pak)
Player of the match: Shaiza Khan (Pak)

- West Indies Women won the toss and elected to field.

==== 4th ODI ====
27 March 2004
Scorecard

Pakistan; 163/7 (50 overs)	v	West Indies; 159 (49.1 overs)
Kiran Baluch 47 (80); Indomatie Goordial-John 1/23 (8 overs)		Envis Williams 26 (37); Urooj Mumtaz 2/21 (6 overs)

Pakistan Women won by 4 runs
Asghar Ali Shah Cricket Stadium, Karachi
Umpires: Junaid Ghafoor (Pak) and Khalid Mahmood (Pak)
Player of the match: Kiran Baluch (Pak)

- Pakistan Women won the toss and elected to bat.

==== 5th ODI ====
29 March 2004
Scorecard

West Indies; 186 (49.4 overs)	v	Pakistan; 140 (50 overs)
Verena Felicien 49 (99); Kiran Baluch 2/36 (9.4 overs)		Kiran Baluch 41 (97); Verena Felicien 4/21 (8 overs)

West Indies Women won by 46 runs
Karachi Gymkhana, Karachi
Umpires: Feroze Butt (Pak) and Khalid Mahmood (Pak)
Player of the match: Verena Felicien (WI)

- West Indies Women won the toss and elected to bat.

==== 6th ODI ====
31 March 2004
Scorecard

Pakistan; 100 (45.1 overs)	v	West Indies; 102/5 (42.5 overs)
Batool Fatima 27 (101); Envis Williams 3/9 (5.1 overs)		Verena Felicien 30* (111); Shaiza Khan 3/28 (10 overs)

West Indies Women won by 5 wickets
Karachi Gymkhana, Karachi
Umpires: Afzaal Ahmed (Pak) and Mohammad Ashgar (Pak)
Player of the match: Verena Felicien (WI)

- Pakistan Women won the toss and elected to bat.

==== 7th ODI ====
2 April 2004
Scorecard

Pakistan; 139/8 (50 overs)	v	West Indies; 143/6 (47.1 overs)
Kiran Baluch 61 (84); Verena Felicien 3/25 (8 overs)		Nelly Williams 30 (90); Kiran Baluch 2/21 (10 overs)

West Indies Women won by 4 wickets
Asghar Ali Shah Cricket Stadium, Karachi
Umpires: Feroze Butt (Pak) and Junaid Ghafoor (Pak)
Player of the match: Kiran Baluch (WI)

- Pakistan Women won the toss and elected to bat.
