= West Indies women's cricket team in South Africa in 2004–05 =

West Indian women's cricket team in South Africa in 2004–05
	South Africa	West Indies
- Dates: 5 April 2005 – 9 April 2005
Captains	Alison Hodgkinson	Stephanie Power

One Day International series
- Results: West Indies won the 3-match series 2–1
Most runs	Cri-Zelda Brits 117	Nelly Williams 128
Most wickets	Alicia Smith 7	Debbie-Ann Lewis 4

The West Indies women's cricket team toured South Africa in 2004–05, playing three women's One Day Internationals after both teams were eliminated from the 2005 Women's Cricket World Cup.

== One Day International series ==
=== 1st ODI ===
5 April 2005
Scorecard

South Africa; 206/8 (50 overs)	v	West Indies; 207/7 (29.1 overs)
Daleen Terblanche 68 (77); Debbie-Ann Lewis 2/28 (8 overs)		Nelly Williams 82 (146); Alicia Smith 3/46 (10 overs)

West Indies won by 3 wickets
Technikon Oval, Pretoria
Umpires: Adriaan Crafford and Brad White

- West Indies won the toss and elected to field.

=== 2nd ODI ===
7 April 2005
Scorecard

South Africa; 134 (40.4 overs)	v	West Indies; 135/3 (31.5 overs)
Daleen Terblanche 33 (61); Felicia Cummings 3/30 (8.4 overs)		Pamela Lavine 50* (48); Lonell de Beer 1/16 (6 overs)

West Indies won by 7 wickets
Technikon Oval, Pretoria
Umpires: Adriaan Crafford and Brad White

- West Indies won the toss and elected to field.

=== 3rd ODI ===
9 April 2005
Scorecard

West Indies; 90 (34.4 overs)	v	South Africa; 91/0 (24.4 overs)
Nadine George 22 (63); Lonell de Beer 3/10 (7.4 overs)		Cri-Zelda Brits 62* (87)

South Africa won by 10 wickets
Technikon Oval, Pretoria
Umpires: Duma Ntuli and Brad White

- South Africa won the toss and elected to field.
