= List of women's One Day International cricket records =

This is a list of Women's One-Day International cricket records, that is, record team and individual performances in Women's One Day International matches.

== Key ==
Team notation

- (300/3) indicates that a team scored 300 runs for three wickets and the innings was closed, either due to a successful run chase or if no overs remained (or are able) to be bowled. * (300) indicates that a team scored 300 runs and was all out, either by losing all ten wickets or by having one or more batters unable to bat and losing the remaining wickets.

Batting notation

- (100) indicates that a batter scored 100 runs and was out.
- (100*) indicates that a batter scored 100 runs and was not out.

Bowling notation

- (5/100) indicates that a bowler has captured five wickets while giving away 100 runs.

Current players

- Current international cricket players have their names in **bold text**

World Cup records

Records set at a World Cup have a light blue background

== Team records ==
=== Team wins, losses and ties ===
==== Results summary ====
Team	Span	Matches	Won	Lost	Tied	NR	% Won*
Australia	1973–2026	397	319	69	2	7	82.05
Bangladesh	2011–2026	90	26	56	2	6	32.73
Denmark	1989–1999	33	6	27	0	0	18.18
England	1973–2026	424	251	156	2	15	61.61
India	1978–2026	348	191	150	2	5	55.97
International XI	1973–1982	18	3	14	0	1	17.64
Ireland	1987–2026	201	56	137	1	7	29.12
Jamaica	1973–1973	5	1	4	0	0	20.00
Japan	2003–2003	5	0	5	0	0	0.00
Netherlands	1984–2026	116	24	91	0	1	20.86
New Zealand	1973–2026	409	197	197	3	12	49.87
Pakistan	1997–2026	233	70	153	3	7	31.63
Papua New Guinea	2024–2026	16	3	13	0	0	18.75
Scotland	2001–2026	24	10	14	0	0	41.66
South Africa	1997–2026	276	144	116	5	11	54.90
Sri Lanka	1997–2026	213	74	128	0	11	36.63
Thailand	2022–2026	17	11	6	0	0	64.70
Trinidad and Tobago	1973–1973	6	2	4	0	0	33.33
United Arab Emirates	2025–2025	8	4	4	0	0	50.00
United States	2024–2025	9	3	6	0	0	33.33
West Indies	1979–2026	250	108	130	3	9	45.85
Young England	1973–1973	6	1	5	0	0	16.66
Zimbabwe	2021–2026	42	11	30	1	0	27.38
*The win percentage excludes no results and counts ties as half a win if there was no tiebreaker (otherwise the tiebreker determines a win or loss). Last updated: 28 October 2026

==== Most consecutive wins ====
Wins	Team	First win	Last win
26	Australia	India at Reliance Stadium, Vadodara on 12 March 2018	India at Great Barrier Reef Arena, Mackay on 24 September 2021
17	Australia	South Africa at M. Chinnaswamy Stadium, Bengaluru on 12 December 1997	South Africa at Allan Border Field, Brisbane on 7 February 1999
16	Australia	New Zealand at Basin Reserve, Wellington on 25 February 1999	South Africa at Bert Sutcliffe Oval, Lincoln on 18 December 2000
16	India	Australia at Bellerive Oval, Hobart on 7 February 2016	Ireland at Senwes Park, Potchefstroom on 15 May 2017
15	Australia	England at Adelaide Oval, Adelaide on 3 February 2022	Pakistan at North Sydney Oval, Sydney on 21 January 2023
Last updated: 29 July 2023.

==== Most consecutive defeats ====
Losses	Team	First loss	Last loss
22	Netherlands	Ireland at Miskin Manor Cricket Club Ground, Glamorgan on 19 August 2005	Ireland at Colts Cricket Club Ground, Colombo on 26 April 2011
20	Netherlands	Denmark at Mikkelberg-Kunst-und-Cricket Center, Hattstedt on 26 July 1998	Pakistan at National Stadium, Karachi on 14 April 2001
19	Sri Lanka	West Indies at R. Premadasa Stadium, Colombo on 18 May 2015	India at P Sara Oval, Colombo on 7 February 2017
15	Pakistan	New Zealand at Hagley Oval, Christchurch on 28 January 1997	Ireland at College Park, Dublin on 1 August 2000
15	Pakistan	West Indies at Karachi Gymkhana, Karachi on 29 March 2004	South Africa at Sinovich Park, Pretoria on 26 January 2007
Last updated: 9 October 2019.

==== Tied matches ====
#	Date	First innings	Second innings	Venue	Ref
1	10 January 1982	New Zealand 147/9 (60 overs)	England 147/8 (60 overs)	Cornwall Park, Auckland	
2	2 February 1982	England 167/8 (60 overs)	Australia 167/10 (60 overs)	Christ's College, Christchurch	
3	17 December 1997	New Zealand 176/9 (50 overs)	India 176/10 (49.1 overs)	Nehru Stadium, Indore	
4	23 October 2009	South Africa 180/6 (50 overs)	West Indies 180/8 (50 overs)	Newlands, Cape Town	
5	27 November 2016	Australia 242/10 (49.5 overs)	South Africa 242/10 (50 overs)	Coffs Harbour International Stadium, Coffs Harbour	
6	12 May 2019	South Africa 265/6 (50 overs)	Pakistan 265/9 (50 overs)	Willowmoore Park, Benoni	
7	19 September 2021	West Indies 192/5 (50 overs) ♠	South Africa 192/7 (50 overs)	Sir Vivian Richards Stadium, North Sound	
8	31 January 2022	South Africa 160 (40.4 overs)	West Indies 160 (37.4 overs) ♠	The Wanderers Stadium, Johannesburg	
9	22 July 2023	Bangladesh 225/4 (50 overs)	India 225 (49.3 overs)	Sher-e-Bangla National Cricket Stadium, Mirpur	
10	7 November 2023	Bangladesh 169/9 (50 overs) ♠	Pakistan 169 (49.5 overs)	Sher-e-Bangla National Cricket Stadium, Mirpur	
11	18 December 2023	New Zealand 251/8 (50 overs)	Pakistan 251/9 (50 overs) ♠	Hagley Oval, Christchurch	
12	21 January 2024	Zimbabwe 227/9 (50 overs)	Ireland 202/9 (43 overs)	Harare Sports Club, Harare	
♠ indicates that the team won a Super Over. Last updated 8 February 2024.

=== Team scoring records ===
==== Highest innings totals ====
Score	Batting team	Opposition	Venue	Date	Ref.
491/4 (50 overs)	New Zealand	Ireland	YMCA Cricket Club, Dublin	8 June 2018	
455/5 (50 overs)	New Zealand	Pakistan	Hagley Oval, Christchurch	29 January 1997	
440/3 (50 overs)	New Zealand	Ireland	Castle Avenue, Dublin	13 June 2018	
435/5 (50 overs)	India	Ireland	Niranjan Shah Stadium, Rajkot	15 January 2025	
418 (49.5 overs)	New Zealand	Ireland	The Vineyard, Dublin	10 June 2018	
Last updated: 15 January 2025.

==== Highest aggregate runs in a single match ====
Runs	Teams	Venue	Date	Ref.
781/20	Australia (412/10) v India (369/10)	Arun Jaitley Cricket Stadium, New Delhi	20 September 2025	
706/18	South Africa (361/8) v Pakistan (345)	Centurion Park, Centurion	25 February 2026	
696/14	South Africa (346/6) v New Zealand (350/8)	Basin Reserve, Wellington	1 April 2026	
679/15	Australia (338/10) v India (341/5)	DY Patil Stadium, Navi Mumbai	30 October 2025	
678/14	England (373/5) v South Africa (305/9)	County Ground, Bristol	5 July 2017	
Updated: 1 April 2026

==== Greatest win margin (by runs) ====
Margin	Teams	Venue	Date	Ref.
408 runs	New Zealand (455/5) beat Pakistan (47) (23 overs)	Hagley Oval, Christchurch	29 January 1997	
374 runs	Australia (397/4) beat Pakistan (23) (24.1 overs)	Wesley Cricket Ground, Melbourne	7 February 1997	
363 runs	Australia (412/3) beat Denmark (49) (25.5 overs)	Middle Income Group Club Ground, Bandra, Mumbai	16 December 1997	
347 runs	New Zealand (491/4) beat Ireland (144) (35.3 overs)	YMCA Cricket Club, Dublin	8 June 2018	
306 runs	New Zealand (418) beat Ireland (112) (35.3 overs)	The Vineyard, Dublin	10 June 2018	
Last updated: 29 July 2023.

==== Highest successful chases ====
Target	Score	Batting team	Opposition	Venue	Date	Ref.
347	350/8 (49.4 overs)	New Zealand	South Africa	Basin Reserve, Wellington	1 April 2026	
339	341/5 (48.3 overs)	India	Australia	DY Patil Stadium, Navi Mumbai	30 October 2025	
331	331/7 (49 overs)	Australia	India	ACA–VDCA Cricket Stadium, Visakhapatnam	12 October 2025	
302	305/4 (44.3 overs)	Sri Lanka	South Africa	JB Marks Oval, Potchefstroom	17 April 2024	
289	289/6 (46.4 overs)	Australia	New Zealand	North Sydney Oval, Sydney	14 December 2012	
Updated: 1 April 2026

==== Lowest innings totals ====
Score	Batting team	Opposition	Venue	Date	Ref.
22 (23.4 overs)	Netherlands	West Indies	Sportpark Het Schootsveld, Deventer	9 July 2008	
23 (24.1 overs)	Pakistan	Australia	Wesley College, Melbourne	7 February 1997	
24 (21.3 overs)	Scotland	England	Bradfield College, Reading	10 August 2001	
26 (19.1 overs)	India	New Zealand	Grainville Cricket Ground, Saint Saviour	11 July 2002	
27 (13.4 overs)	Pakistan	Australia	Lal Bahadur Shastri Stadium, Hyderabad	14 December 1997	
Updated: 1 August 2019

== Batting records ==
=== Most career runs ===
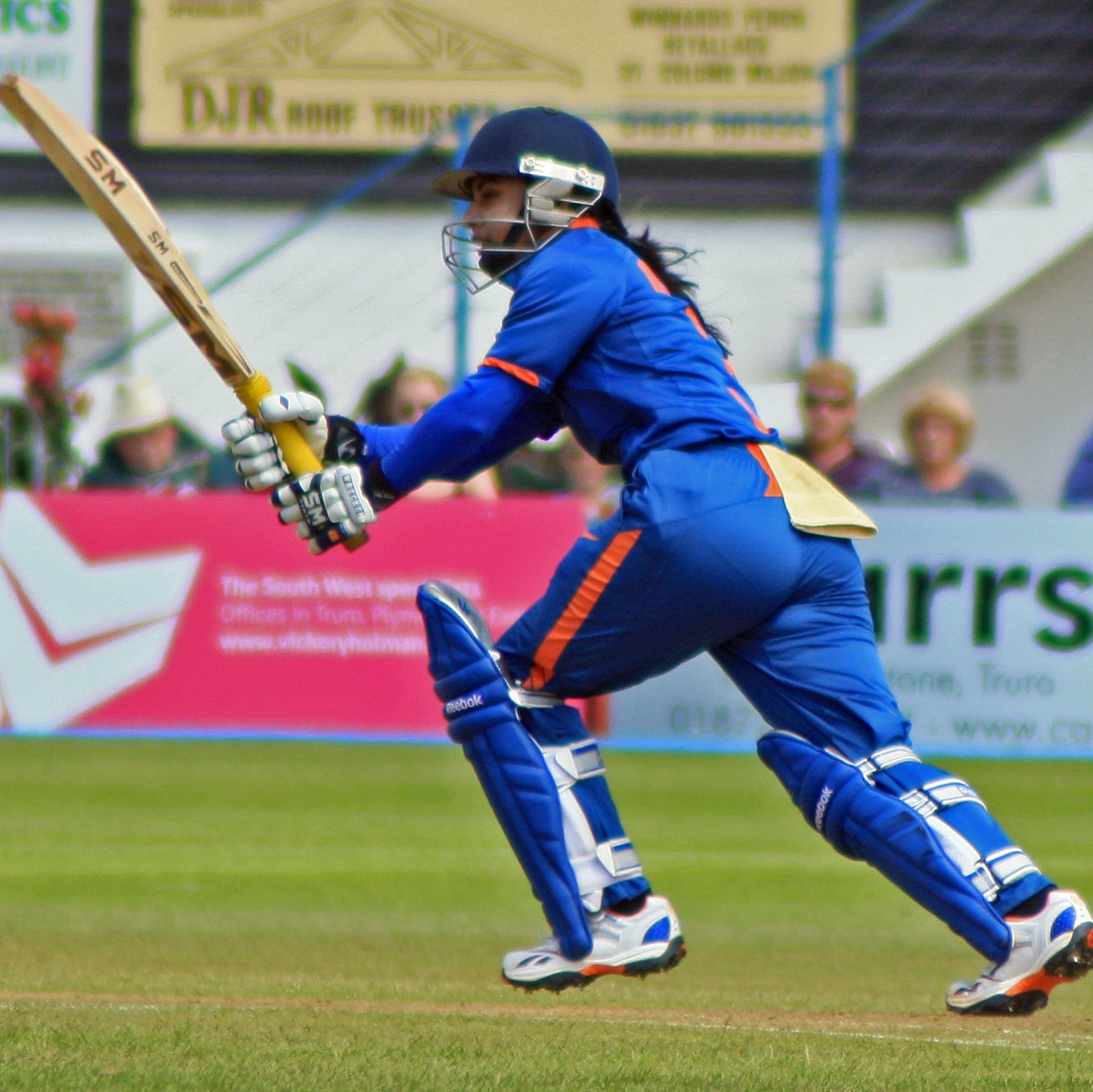
Mithali Raj is the leading run-scorer in ODIs.

Rank	Runs	Batter	Innings	Average	100s	50s	Period
1	7,805	(India) Mithali Raj	211	50.68	7	64	1999–2022
2	6,396	(Cricket West Indies) **Stafanie Taylor**	175	43.21	10	42	2008–2026
3	5,992	(England) Charlotte Edwards	180	38.16	9	46	1997–2016
4	5,982	(New Zealand) Suzie Bates	174	37.86	13	37	2006–2026
5	5,695	(South Africa) **Laura Wolvaardt**	127	51.30	13	40	2016–2026
6	5,443	(India) **Smriti Mandhana**	122	47.33	14	35	2013–2026
7	4,844	(Australia) Belinda Clark	114	47.49	5	30	1991–2005
8	4,814	(Australia) Karen Rolton	132	48.14	8	33	1995–2009
9	4,738	(England) Tammy Beaumont	130	40.49	12	24	2009–2025
10	4,691	(Australia) **Ellyse Perry**	143	49.37	3	38	2007–2026
Last updated: 25 October 2026

=== Most runs in each batting position ===
Batting Position	Batter	Innings	Runs	Period	Ref.
Opener	(South Africa) **Laura Wolvaardt**	127	5,695	2016-2026	
Number 3	(India) Mithali Raj	96	3,758	2000–2022	
Number 4	(India) Mithali Raj	95	3,358	2000–2022	
Number 5	(South Africa) **Marizanne Kapp**	60	1,730	2010–2025	
Number 6	(Australia) **Ashleigh Gardner**	36	1,136	2019–2026	
Number 7	(South Africa) **Chloe Tryon**	40	966	2013–2026	
Number 8	(New Zealand) Nicola Browne	21	441	2003–2013	
Number 9	(India) Jhulan Goswami	32	329	2002–2022	
Number 10	(Cricket West Indies) Anisa Mohammed	31	228	2003–2022	
Number 11	(Cricket West Indies) **Shamilia Connell**	27	104	2014–2024	
Last updated: 4 April 2026

=== Highest scores ===
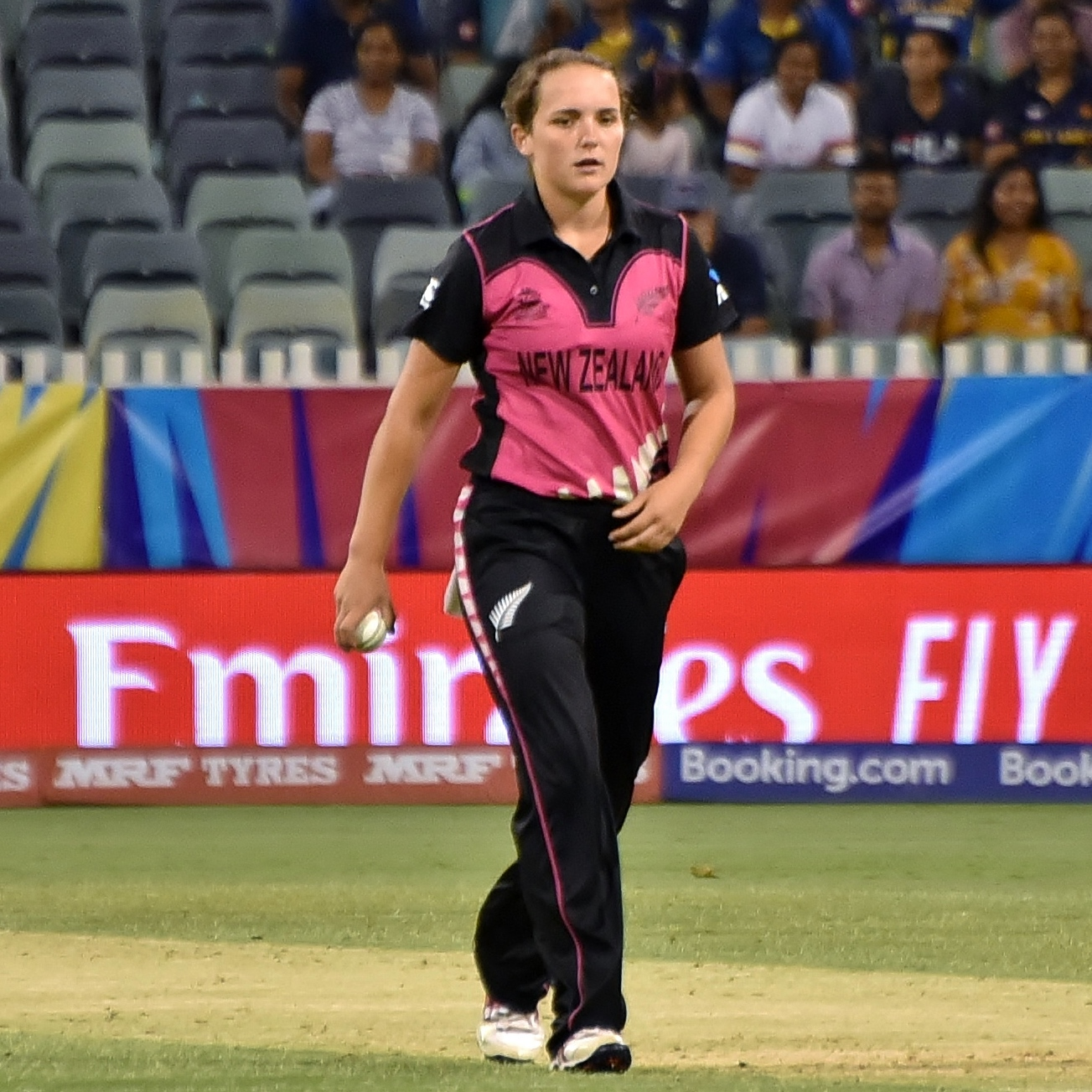
Amelia Kerr holds the record for the highest score made in a single ODI.

Runs	Batter	Opposition	Venue	Date	Ref.
232*	(New Zealand) **Amelia Kerr**	Ireland	YMCA Cricket Club, Dublin	13 June 2018	
229*	(Australia) Belinda Clark	Denmark	Middle Income Group Club Ground, Mumbai	16 December 1997	
195*	(Sri Lanka) **Chamari Athapaththu**	South Africa	JB Marks Oval, Potchefstroom	17 April 2024	
188	(India) **Deepti Sharma**	Ireland	JB Marks Oval, Potchefstroom	15 May 2017	
184*	(South Africa) **Laura Wolvaardt**	Sri Lanka	JB Marks Oval, Potchefstroom	17 April 2024	
Last updated: 18 April 2024.

==== Progression of the high score record ====
Runs	Player	Opponent	Date	Ref.
134	(England) Lynne Thomas	International XI	23 June 1973	
138*	(England) Janette Brittin	International XI	14 January 1982	
143*	(Australia) Lindsay Reeler	Netherlands	29 November 1988	
156*	(Australia) Lisa Keightley	Pakistan	7 February 1997	
229*	(Australia) Belinda Clark	Denmark	16 December 1997	
232*	(New Zealand) **Amelia Kerr**	Ireland	13 June 2018	
Last updated: 29 July 2023.

=== High scores by batting positions ===
Position	Player	Runs	Opposition	Venue	Date	Ref.
Openers	(New Zealand) Amelia Kerr	232*	Ireland	YMCA Cricket Club, Dublin	13 June 2018	
Position 3	(New Zealand) Amelia Kerr	179*	South Africa	Basin Reserve, Wellington	1 April 2026	
Position 4	(India) Harmanpreet Kaur	171*	Australia	County Ground, Derby	20 July 2017	
Position 5	(England) Nat Sciver-Brunt	129	New Zealand	County Ground, Derby	12 July 2017	
Position 6	(Australia) Ashleigh Gardner	115	New Zealand	Holkar Stadium, Indore	1 October 2025	
Position 7	(Cricket West Indies) Shemaine Campbelle	105	Sri Lanka	Rangiri Dambulla International Stadium, Dambulla	24 February 2013	
Position 8	(India) Richa Ghosh	94	South Africa	ACA–VDCA Cricket Stadium, Visakhapatnam	9 October 2025	
Position 9	(India) Pooja Vastrakar	62*	Australia	Wankhede Stadium, Mumbai	28 December 2023	
Position 10	(Australia) Alana King	51*	Pakistan	R. Premadasa Stadium, Colombo	8 October 2025	
Position 11	(Zimbabwe) Josephine Nkomo	31*	Thailand	Terdthai Cricket Ground, Bangkok	21 April 2023	
Last updated: 1 April 2026

=== Most runs in a calendar year ===
Runs	Batter	Innings	Year
1,362	(India) Smriti Mandhana	23	2025
1,174	(South Africa) Laura Wolvaardt	21	2025
976	(India) Pratika Rawal	20	2025
970	(Australia) Belinda Clark	14	1997
937	(South Africa) Tazmin Brits	21	2025
Last updated: 19 December 2025

=== Most runs against each opponent ===
Opposition	Player	Runs	Innings	Period	Ref.
Australia	(New Zealand) Debbie Hockley	1,664	51	1982–2000	
Bangladesh	(South Africa) Lizelle Lee	712	14	2013–2018	
England	(India) Mithali Raj	2,005	54	1999–2022	
India	(England) Charlotte Edwards	1,102	39	1999–2014	
Ireland	(South Africa) **Laura Wolvaardt**	775	12	2016–2025	
Netherlands	(Thailand) **Natthakan Chantam**	396	6	2022–2023	
New Zealand	(Australia) Belinda Clark	2,272	53	1991–2005	
Pakistan	(Cricket West Indies) **Stafanie Taylor**	1,287	28	2009–2025	
South Africa	(England) Charlotte Edwards	1,318	31	1997–2016	
Scotland	(Ireland) **Leah Paul**	182	4	2023–2025	
Sri Lanka	(India) Mithali Raj	1,103	22	2004–2018	
Thailand	(Netherlands) **Babette de Leede**	164	6	2022–2023	
West Indies	(New Zealand) Suzie Bates	736	20	2009–2022	
United Arab Emirates	(Zimbabwe) **Loryn Phiri**	134	4	2025–2025	
United States	(Zimbabwe) **Chipo Mugeri-Tiripano**	249	7	2024–2025	
United States	(Zimbabwe) **Modester Mupachikwa**	249	7	2024–2025	
Zimbabwe	(Ireland) **Gaby Lewis**	473	9	2021–2025	
Last Updated: 19 December 2025

=== Most career centuries ===
No.of Centuries	Player	Innings	Period
15	(Australia) Meg Lanning	102	2011–2023
14	(Cricket West Indies) **Hayley Matthews**	108	2014–2026
14	(India) **Smriti Mandhana**	122	2013–2026
13	(South Africa) **Laura Wolvaardt**	127	2016–2026
13	(New Zealand) Suzie Bates	174	2006–2026
Last updated: 30 September 2026

=== Most 50+ scores ===
50+ score	Player	Innings	100s	50s	Period
71	(India) Mithali Raj	211	7	64	1999–2022
55	(England) Charlotte Edwards	180	9	46	1997–2016
53	(South Africa) **Laura Wolvaardt**	127	13	40	2016–2026
52	(Cricket West Indies) **Stafanie Taylor**	172	10	42	2008–2026
50	(New Zealand) Suzie Bates	174	13	37	2006–2026
Last updated: 15 July 2026

=== Highest career batting average ===
Average	Player	Innings	Runs	NO	Period
58.45	(England) Rachael Heyhoe Flint	20	643	9	1973–1982
57.44	(Australia) Lindsay Reeler	23	1,034	5	1984–1988
54.19	(India) **Pratika Rawal**	29	1,409	3	2024–2026
53.51	(Australia) Meg Lanning	102	4,602	16	2011–2023
53.40	(Australia) Bronwyn Calver	21	534	11	1991–1998
Qualification: 20 innings Last updated: 28 October 2026

=== Highest strike rates ===
Strike rate	Player	Runs	Balls faced	Period
116.20	(Australia) **Georgia Voll**	710	611	2024–2026
110.46	(Australia) **Ashleigh Gardner**	1,699	1,538	2017–2026
107.04	(England) **Maia Bouchier**	729	681	2023–2026
102.45	(India) **Richa Ghosh**	1,215	1,188	2021–2026
101.05	(South Africa) **Chloe Tryon**	2,431	2,403	2011–2026
Qualification: 500 balls faced. Last updated: 25 October 2026

=== Highest batting average in each position ===
Batting Position	Batter	Average	Innings	Runs	Period	Ref.
Opener	(New Zealand) Debbie Hockley	54.54	54	2,400	1987–2000	
Number 3	(Australia) Meg Lanning	61.66	70	3,453	2012–2023	
Number 4	(Australia) **Ellyse Perry**	59.87	52	1,976	2008–2023	
Number 5	(South Africa) **Marizanne Kapp**	39.31	60	1,730	2010–2025	
Number 6	(India) **Deepti Sharma**	44.68	36	983	2015–2026	
Number 7	(South Africa) **Chloe Tryon**	28.41	40	966	2013–2026	
Number 8	(New Zealand) Nicola Browne	33.92	21	441	2003–2013	
Number 9	(India) Jhulan Goswami	19.35	32	329	2002–2022	
Number 10	(Cricket West Indies) Anisa Mohammed	15.20	31	228	2003–2022	
Number 11	(Cricket West Indies) **Shamilia Connell**	10.40	27	104	2014–2024	
Qualification: 20 innings Last updated: 28 October 2026

=== Most career sixes ===
Sixes	Batter	Innings	Period
92	(Cricket West Indies) **Deandra Dottin**	148	2008–2026
80	(South Africa) **Chloe Tryon**	108	2011–2026
75	(New Zealand) Sophie Devine	144	2006–2025
74	(India) **Smriti Mandhana**	120	2013–2026
70	(South Africa) Lizelle Lee	99	2013–2022
Last updated: 4 April 2026

=== Most career fours ===
Fours	Batter	Innings	Period
805+	(India) Mithali Raj	211	1999–2022
693	(New Zealand) Suzie Bates	174	2006–2026
686+	(England) Charlotte Edwards	180	1997–2016
657	(India) **Smriti Mandhana**	122	2013–2026
656	(South Africa) **Laura Wolvaardt**	127	2016–2026
Last updated: 25 October 2026

=== Most ducks in career ===
Ducks	Player	Innings	Period
18	(India) Jhulan Goswami	121	2002–2022
16	(England) Charlotte Edwards	180	1997–2016
14	(England) Lucy Pearson	32	1998–2005
14	(New Zealand) Sara McGlashan	125	2002–2016
13	(Pakistan) Qanita Jalil	59	2005–2015
13	(Pakistan) Batool Fatima	67	2001–2014
13	(Cricket West Indies) Anisa Mohammed	91	2003–2022
Last updated: 13 February 2023.

=== Most runs without scoring a century ===
Runs	Player	High Score	Period
3,369	(Pakistan) **Bismah Maroof**	99	2006–2024
2,703	(South Africa) Trisha Chetty	95	2007–2022
2,438	(New Zealand) Sara McGlashan	97*	2002–2016
2,431	(South Africa) **Chloe Tryon**	92	2011–2026
2,029	(Sri Lanka) Shashikala Siriwardene	68	2003–2019
Last updated: 4 April 2026

== Bowling records ==
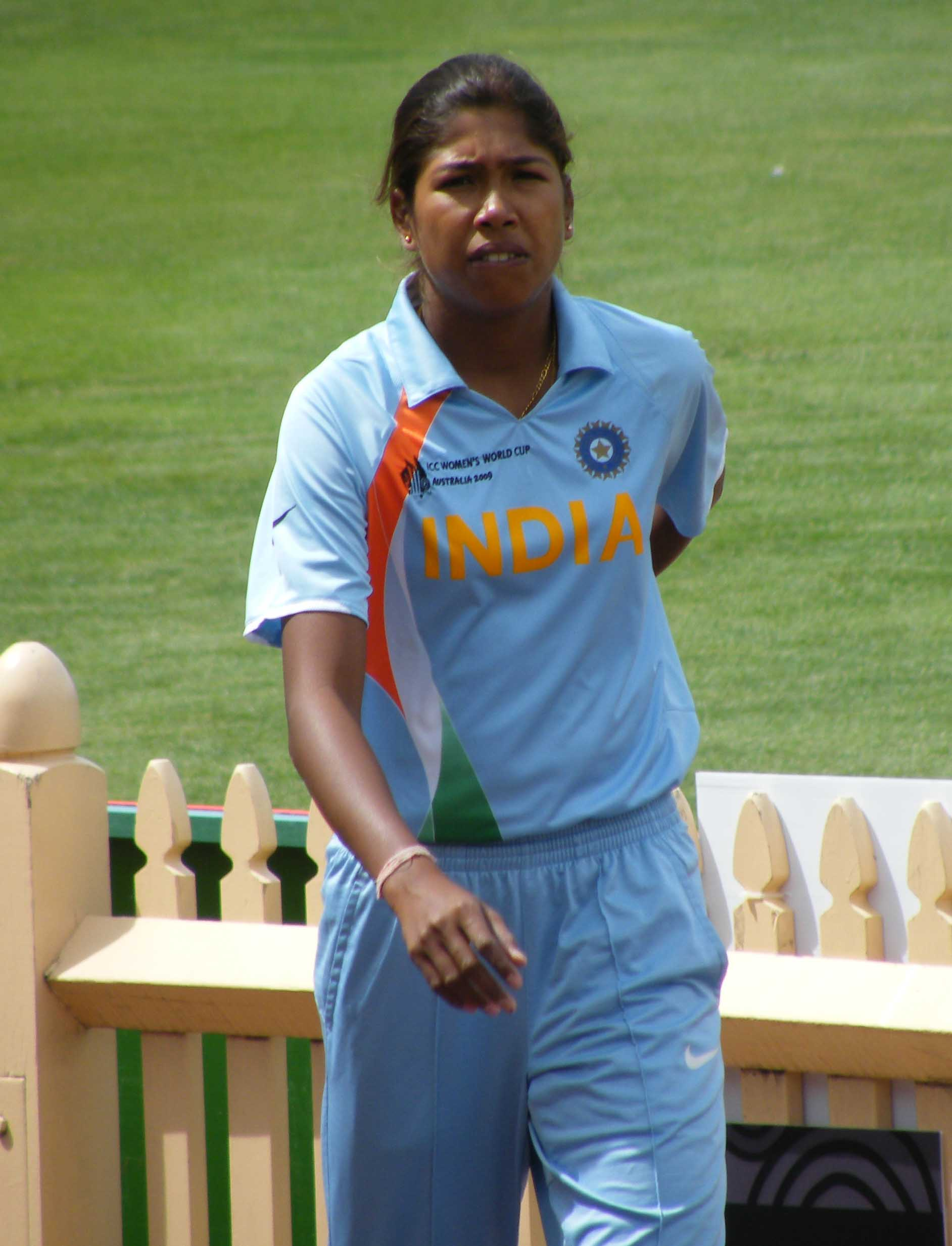
Jhulan Goswami is the leading wicket-taker in ODIs.

=== Most career wickets ===
Wickets	Bowler	Innings	Average	Strike rate	Period
255	(India) Jhulan Goswami	203	22.04	39.23	2002–2022
191	(South Africa) Shabnim Ismail	126	19.95	32.30	2007–2022
181	(South Africa) **Marizanne Kapp**	152	24.24	37.85	2009–2025
180	(Australia) Cathryn Fitzpatrick	109	16.79	33.42	1993–2007
180	(Cricket West Indies) Anisa Mohammed	134	20.75	34.73	2003–2022
171	(India) **Deepti Sharma**	125	27.33	36.88	2014–2026
170	(England) Katherine Sciver-Brunt	139	24.00	40.27	2005–2022
167	(Australia) **Ellyse Perry**	140	25.46	34.94	2007–2026
158	(Australia) **Megan Schutt**	114	23.07	32.70	2012–2026
157	(Cricket West Indies) **Stafanie Taylor**	139	22.14	37.07	2008–2026
Last updated: 25 October 2026

=== Best bowling figures in a match ===
Figures	Bowler	Opposition	Venue	Date	Ref.
7/4 (8.0 overs)	(Pakistan) Sajjida Shah	Japan	Sportpark Drieburg, Amsterdam	21 July 2003	
7/8 (9.0 overs)	(England) Jo Chamberlain	Denmark	Sportpark Koninklijke, Haarlem	19 July 1991	
7/14 (8.3 overs)	(Cricket West Indies) Anisa Mohammed	Pakistan	Sher-e-Bangla National Cricket Stadium, Dhaka	26 November 2011	
7/22 (10.0 overs)	(Australia) Ellyse Perry	England	St Lawrence Ground, Canterbury	7 July 2019	
7/24 (7.4 overs)	(Australia) Shelley Nitschke	England	Chester Road North Ground, Kidderminster	19 August 2005	
Last updated: 29 July 2023.

=== Most wickets in a calendar year ===
Wickets	Bowler	Innings	Year
39	(India) Deepti Sharma	23	2025
37	(Cricket West Indies) Anisa Mohammed	13	2011
37	(South Africa) Shabnim Ismail	16	2022
37	(South Africa) Suné Luus	22	2016
36	(Australia) Charmaine Mason	15	2000
Updated: 2 November 2025

=== Most four-wicket hauls ===
4+	Bowler	Innings	Period
13	(Cricket West Indies) Anisa Mohammed	134	2003–2022
11	(Australia) Cathryn Fitzpatrick	109	1993–2007
10	(New Zealand) **Amelia Kerr**	86	2016–2026
9	(India) Jhulan Goswami	203	2002–2022
8	(Australia) **Jess Jonassen**	92	2012–2023
8	(South Africa) **Dane van Niekerk**	103	2009–2025
8	(South Africa) **Suné Luus**	107	2012–2026
8	(Pakistan) Sana Mir	118	2005–2019
8	(South Africa) Shabnim Ismail	126	2007–2022
8	(England) Katherine Sciver-Brunt	139	2005–2022
Last updated: 11 March 2026

=== Most five-wicket hauls ===
5+	Bowler	Innings	Period
6	(Cricket West Indies) Anisa Mohammed	134	2003–2022
5	(South Africa) **Suné Luus**	106	2012–2026
5	(England) Katherine Sciver-Brunt	139	2005–2022
4	(Australia) Cathryn Fitzpatrick	109	1993–2007
4	(India) **Deepti Sharma**	122	2014–2026
Last updated: 2 November 2025

=== Best bowling average ===
Average	Bowler	Wickets	Runs	Period
12.53	(England) Gillian Smith	41	514	1986–1993
13.26	(Australia) Lyn Fullston	73	968	1982–1988
13.85	(Australia) Charmaine Mason	83	1,150	1997–2001
13.92	(Australia) Denise Martin	27	376	1982–1987
14.41	(Sri Lanka) Rose Fernando	43	620	1997–2009
Qualification: 1,000 balls bowled. Last updated: 30 January 2020.

=== Best bowling strike rate ===
Strike rate	Bowler	Wickets	Balls bowled	Period
27.30	(Australia) **Alana King**	86	2,348	2022–2026
27.66	(Australia) **Annabel Sutherland**	69	1,909	2020–2026
28.50	(Australia) Charmaine Mason	83	2,366	1997–2001
29.17	(England) Rosalie Birch	46	1,342	2003–2008
29.29	(New Zealand) Leigh Kasperek	65	1,904	2015–2021
Qualification: 1,000 balls bowled Last updated: 14 October 2026

=== Best economy rate ===
Economy rate	Bowler	Runs	Overs bowled	Period
1.81	(New Zealand) Sue Brown	308	170.0	1982–1986
1.86	(Australia) Sharon Tredrea	521	280.0	1973–1988
1.96	(Australia) Raelee Thompson	448	228.0	1973–1988
1.97	(New Zealand) Brigit Legg	394	199.4	1987–1990
2.02	(England) Gill Smith	514	253.3	1986–1993
Qualification: 1,000 balls bowled Last updated: 9 September 2023.

=== Most maiden overs ===
Maidens	Bowler	Overs	Innings	Period
265	(India) Jhulan Goswami	1,667.3	203	2002–2022
205	(England) Clare Taylor	856.4	104	1988–2005
189	(India) Neetu David	815.2	97	1995–2008
188	(Australia) Cathryn Fitzpatrick	1,002.5	109	1993–2007
157	(England) Katherine Sciver-Brunt	1,141.1	139	2005–2022
Last updated: 9 September 2023.

== Fielding records ==
=== Most catches by a fielder ===
Catches	Fielder	Innings	Ct/Inn	Period
94	(New Zealand) Suzie Bates	181	0.519	2006–2026
73	(Cricket West Indies) **Stafanie Taylor**	179	0.407	2008–2026
69	(India) Jhulan Goswami	203	0.339	2002–2022
68	(India) **Harmanpreet Kaur**	166	0.409	2009–2026
67	(South Africa) **Suné Luus**	149	0.449	2012–2026
The list excludes catches made as wicket-keeper. Last updated: 28 September 2026

== Wicketkeeping records ==
=== Most dismissals ===
Dismissals	Wicket-keeper	Innings	Catches	Stumpings	Dis/Inn	Period
182	(South Africa) Trisha Chetty	131	131	51	1.389	2007–2022
136	(England) Sarah Taylor	116	85	51	1.172	2006–2019
133	(New Zealand) Rebecca Rolls	101	89	44	1.316	1997–2007
119	(Australia) Alyssa Healy	117	81	38	1.017	2010–2025
114	(England) Jane Smit	106	69	45	1.075	1993–2007
Innings refers to when the player was the designated keeper. All figures exclude catches not made as a wicketkeeper. Last updated: 30 November 2025.

=== Most catches as wicketkeeper ===
Catches	Wicket-keeper	Innings	Period
131	(South Africa) Trisha Chetty	131	2007–2022
89	(New Zealand) Rebecca Rolls	101	1997–2007
85	(England) **Amy Jones**	92	2013–2026
85	(England) Sarah Taylor	116	2006–2019
81	(Australia) Alyssa Healy	117	2010–2026
Innings refers to when the player was the designated keeper. All figures exclude catches not made as a wicketkeeper. Last updated: 16 May 2026

=== Most stumpings ===
Stumpings	Wicket-keeper	Innings	Period
51	(India) Anju Jain	62	1993–2005
51	(England) Sarah Taylor	116	2006–2019
51	(South Africa) Trisha Chetty	131	2007–2022
46	(Pakistan) Batool Fatima	68	2001–2014
45	(England) Jane Smit	106	1993–2007
Innings refers to when the player was the designated keeper. Last updated: 22 July 2023

=== Most stumpings in an innings ===
Stumpings	Wicket-keeper	Opponent	Date	Ref.
5	(India) Venkatacher Kalpana	Denmark	29 July 1993	
5	(India) Karu Jain	New Zealand	13 March 2006	
4	(India) Anju Jain	West Indies	26 February 2004	
4	(Pakistan) Batool Fatima	West Indies	23 March 2004	
4	(Ireland) Jean Carroll	Netherlands	24 February 2008	
4	(Pakistan) Najiha Alvi	Bangladesh	7 November 2023	
Last updated: 8 February 2024.

== Partnership records ==
=== Most partnership runs (by a pair) ===
Runs	Batters	Batting team	Innings	Highest	Average	100s	50s	Period
3,339	Belinda Clark & Lisa Keightley	Australia	67	219	52.17	10	16	1995–2005
2,637	Deandra Dottin & Stafanie Taylor	West Indies	65	151*	45.46	6	12	2008–2026
2,513	Lizelle Lee & Laura Wolvaardt	South Africa	55	169	46.53	7	15	2016–2022
2,482	Tazmin Brits & Laura Wolvaardt	South Africa	53	260	47.73	8	10	2021–2026
2,425	Suzie Bates & Amy Satterthwaite	New Zealand	53	174*	49.48	9	11	2007–2022
An asterisk (*) signifies an unbroken partnership (i.e. neither of the batter was dismissed before either the end of the allotted overs or the required score being reached). Last updated: 15 July 2026

=== Highest partnerships (by runs) ===
Runs	Wicket	First player	Second player	Team	Opposition	Date	Ref.
320	1st	Deepti Sharma	Punam Raut	India	Ireland	15 May 2017	
295	2nd	Amelia Kerr	Leigh Kasperek	New Zealand	Ireland	13 June 2018	
275	2nd	Tammy Beaumont	Sarah Taylor	England	South Africa	5 May 2017	
268	1st	Sarah Taylor	Caroline Atkins	England	South Africa	8 August 2008	
262	2nd	Haidee Tiffen	Suzie Bates	New Zealand	Pakistan	19 March 2009	
Last updated: 27 July 2023.

=== Highest partnerships (by wicket) ===
Wicket	Runs	First Player	Second Player	Team	Opposition	Date	Refs.
1st	320	Deepti Sharma	Punam Raut	India	Ireland	15 May 2017	
2nd	295	Amelia Kerr	Leigh Kasperek	New Zealand	Ireland	13 June 2018	
3rd	244	Karen Rolton	Lisa Sthalekar	Australia	Ireland	31 July 2005	
4th	224*	Johmari Logtenberg	Mignon du Preez	South Africa	Netherlands	5 August 2007	
5th	188*	Claire Taylor	Jane Smit	England	Sri Lanka	12 December 2000	
6th	142	Suné Luus	Chloe Tryon	South Africa	Ireland	5 August 2016	
7th	130*	Amy Jones	Charlie Dean	England	New Zealand	1 April 2024	
8th	115	Priyanaz Chatterji	Rachel Slater	Scotland	Bangladesh	15 April 2025	
9th	106	Beth Mooney	Alana King	Australia	Pakistan	8 October 2025	
10th	76	Alex Blackwell	Kristen Beams	Australia	India	20 July 2017	
Updated: 8 October 2025

== All-rounder ==
=== List of players to make 1000 runs, 50 wickets and 50 catches ===
Player	Matches	Runs	Wickets	Catches	Period
(England) Charlotte Edwards	191	5,992	54	52	1997–2016
(India) Jhulan Goswami	204	1,228	255	69	2002–2022
(New Zealand) Suzie Bates	184	5,982	83	94	2006–2026
(New Zealand) Amy Satterthwaite	145	4,639	50	57	2007–2022
(Australia) **Ellyse Perry**	168	4,581	166	56	2007–2026
(Cricket West Indies) **Stafanie Taylor**	180	6,341	157	73	2008–2026
(South Africa) **Dane van Niekerk**	110	2,273	138	57	2009–2025
(England) Heather Knight	160	4,372	56	51	2010–2026
(South Africa) **Suné Luus**	151	3,141	128	67	2012–2026
(England) **Nat Sciver-Brunt**	129	4,354	88	53	2013–2025
(Cricket West Indies) **Hayley Matthews**	109	3,748	142	65	2014–2026
Last updated: 24 September 2026

== Other individual records ==
=== Most matches played ===
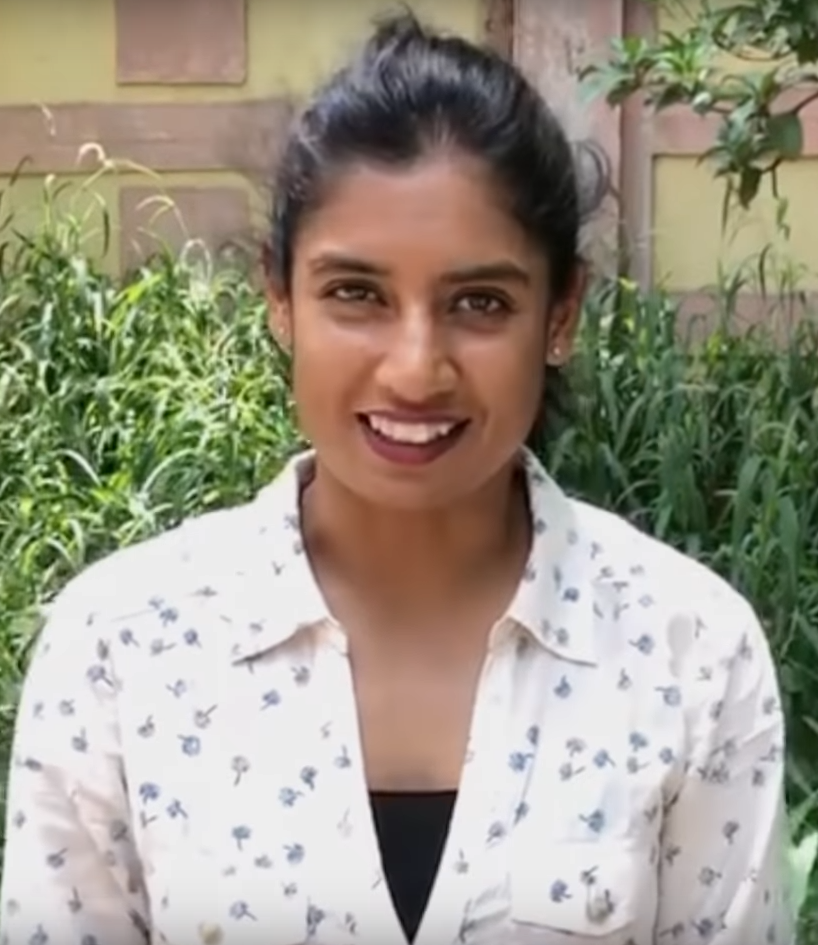
Mithali Raj, the player to play in more ODI matches than any other and with the most matches as captain.

Rank	Matches	Name	Runs	Wkts	Period
1	232	(India) Mithali Raj	7,805	8	1999–2022
2	204	(India) Jhulan Goswami	1,228	255	2002–2022
3	191	(England) Charlotte Edwards	5,992	54	1997–2016
4	184	(New Zealand) Suzie Bates	5,982	83	2006–2026
5	180	(Cricket West Indies) **Stafanie Taylor**	6,341	157	2008–2026
Last updated: 24 September 2026

=== Most consecutive career matches ===
Matches	Player	Period
109	(India) Mithali Raj	2004–2013
106	(England) Tammy Beaumont	2016–2025
101	(South Africa) Mignon du Preez	2009–2018
88	(Sri Lanka) Chamari Athapaththu	2015–2026
87	(India) Harmanpreet Kaur	2010–2019
[*] indicates a streak in progress. Last updated: 25 February 2026

=== Youngest players ===
Age	Player	Date	Ref.
12 years, 171 days	(Pakistan) Sajjida Shah	23 July 2000	
13 years, 243 days	(Ireland) Lucy O'Reilly	10 July 2013	
13 years, 274 days	(Ireland) Elena Tice	17 August 2011	
13 years, 355 days	(Scotland) Fiona Urquhart	10 August 2001	
13 years, 360 days	(Ireland) Louise Little	11 May 2017	
Last updated: 9 September 2023.

=== Oldest players ===
Age	Player	Date	Ref.
47 years, 355 days	(Cricket West Indies) Stephanie Power	9 April 2005	
45 years, 296 days	(England) Kay Green	18 July 1973	
43 years, 86 days	(New Zealand) Ann McKenna	21 January 1987	
42 years, 241 days	(England) Rachael Heyhoe Flint	7 February 1982	
42 years, 183 days	(Cricket West Indies) Envis Williams	9 April 2005	
ESPNcricinfo incorrectly has Ethna Rouse's birthdate as 1930 rather than 1937. Last updated: 9 September 2023.

=== Most matches as captain ===
Matches	Player	Won	Lost	Tied	NR	Won%	Period
155	(India) Mithali Raj	89	63	0	3	58.55	2004–2022
117	(England) Charlotte Edwards	72	38	0	7	65.45	2005–2016
101	(Australia) Belinda Clark	83	17	0	1	83.00	1994–2005
94	(England) Heather Knight	62	29	0	3	68.13	2016–2025
79	(New Zealand) Suzie Bates	42	35	0	2	54.54	2011–2025
Last updated: 17 January 2025.

=== Most player-of-the-match awards ===
No. of Awards	Player	Matches	Period
29	(Cricket West Indies) **Stafanie Taylor**	179	2008–2026
20	(India) Mithali Raj	232	1999–2022
19	(Cricket West Indies) **Hayley Matthews**	111	2014–2026
18	(India) **Smriti Mandhana**	122	2013–2026
17	(Australia) **Ellyse Perry**	171	2007–2026
17	(England) Charlotte Edwards	191	1997–2016
Last updated: 14 October 2026

=== Most player-of-the-series awards ===
No. of Awards	Player	Period
7	(Cricket West Indies) **Stafanie Taylor**	2008–2026
5	(New Zealand) **Amelia Kerr**	2016–2026
5	(Cricket West Indies) **Hayley Matthews**	2014–2026
5	(Australia) Karen Rolton	1995–2009
4	(South Africa) **Suné Luus**	2012–2026
4	(Australia) **Ellyse Perry**	2007–2026
Last updated: 14 October 2026

== See also ==
- List of women's Test cricket records
- List of women's Twenty20 International records
- List of men's Twenty20 International records
