= Emma Beamish =

Irish cricketer

Personal information
- Full name: Emma Alice Beamish
- Born: 29 November 1982 (age 43); Merrion, Dublin, Ireland
- Batting: Right-handed
- Bowling: Right-arm medium
- Role: Batter

International information
- National side: Ireland (2003–2010)
- ODI debut (cap 48): 25 July 2003 v Netherlands
- Last ODI: 11 August 2010 v Netherlands
- T20I debut (cap 1): 27 June 2008 v West Indies
- Last T20I: 6 August 2009 v Netherlands

Domestic team information
- Years: Team
- 1999–2000: Surrey

Career statistics
Competition	WODI	WT20I	WLA	WT20
Matches	18	6	31	10
Runs scored	131	33	271	116
Batting average	8.18	8.25	10.03	23.20
100s/50s	0/0	0/0	0/0	0/1
Top score	40	14	40	83*
Balls bowled	–	–	78	–
Wickets	–	–	1	–
Bowling average	–	–	37.00	–
5 wickets in innings	–	–	0	–
10 wickets in match	–	–	0	–
Best bowling	–	–	1/9	–
Catches/stumpings	4/–	0/–	4/–	0/–
- Source: CricketArchive, 1 June 2021

Emma Alice Beamish (born 29 November 1982) is an Irish former cricketer who played as a right-handed batter. She appeared in 18 One Day Internationals (ODIs) and 6 Twenty20 Internationals (T20Is) for Ireland between 2003 and 2010. She also played domestic cricket for Surrey, mainly representing their Second XI in the 1999 and 2000 County Championships.

Beamish was born in Dublin. She made her international debut at the 2003 IWCC Trophy, playing ODI matches against the Netherlands and Scotland. Against Scotland, she scored 40 runs at number five in the batting order, which remained the highest score of her career. At the 2005 World Cup in South Africa, Beamish played in five of her team's six matches, but had little success. In her last two matches of the tournament, against Australia and New Zealand, she was used as an opener, partnering Jillian Smythe. After the World Cup, Beamish made regular appearances in Ireland's line-up for several more seasons, both in ODIs and in T20Is. Her last matches for Ireland came in August 2012, in a European tournament that was part of the qualification process for the 2014 World Twenty20.

Beamish also has epilepsy and lives with the anxiety of never knowing when it may strike again and is prescribed sodium valproate.
