= Doris Francis =

Dominican cricketer

Personal information
- Born: 6 October 1969 (age 57); Dominica
- Batting: Right-handed
- Bowling: Right-arm medium
- Role: Bowler

International information
- National sides: West Indies (2003–2004); United States (2009–2011)
- Only Test (cap 22): 15 March 2004; West Indies v Pakistan
- ODI debut (cap 37): 13 March 2003; West Indies v Sri Lanka
- Last ODI: 2 April 2004; West Indies v Pakistan

Domestic team information
- Years: Team
- 1996–2002: Dominica
- 2003–2004: Saint Lucia
- 2009–2011: United States

Career statistics
Competition	WTest	WODI	WLA
Matches	1	17	38
Runs scored	46	81	503
Batting average	46.00	7.36	18.62
100s/50s	0/0	0/0	0/2
Top score	46*	17	91*
Balls bowled	132	716	1,162
Wickets	0	13	27
Bowling average	–	29.30	26.88
5 wickets in innings	0	0	0
10 wickets in match	0	0	0
Best bowling	–	2/16	3/31
Catches/stumpings	1/–	5/–	5/–
- Source: Cricinfo, 25 April 2024

Doris Francis (born 6 October 1969) is a Dominican former cricketer who played primarily as a right-arm medium bowler. She appeared in one Test match and 17 One Day Internationals for the West Indies between in 2003 and 2004. She also played for the United States between 2009 and 2011. She played domestic cricket for Dominica and Saint Lucia.

== Domestic career ==
She made her List A debut for Dominica against Trinidad and Tobago on 20 May 1996 in Caribbean Women's Cricket Federation Championships. Later she List A debut for Saint Lucia against Jamaica on 20 June 2003.

She also featured for New York Warriors and Tristate Lynx in 2010 and 2013 respectively in US Open Women’s T20 cricket.

== International career ==
=== Career in West Indies ===
Francis made her One Day International (ODI) debut on 13 March 2003, in a series against Sri Lanka. Later in the year, she also featured in the 2003 IWCC Trophy. She made her Test debut against Pakistan on 15 March 2004. In the second innings of the Test, she made unbeaten 46 from ninth in the batting order, putting on 105 runs for the eighth wicket with Jacqueline Robinson.

=== Career in United States ===
She continued playing cricket after moving to the United States, and made her debut for the US national team at the 2009 ICC Women's Americas Championship. She was one of three former West Indies internationals in the side, the others being Candacy Atkins and Roselyn Emmanuel. In the first match of the tournament, against Brazil, Francis took 2/9 and scored 10*, for which she was named player of the match. She returned for the tournament's 2010 ICC Women's Americas Championship, taking 3/16 against Canada.

In 2011, she won the best bowler and Most Valuable Player (MVP) award in USACA Women's tournament. In the following year she appointed as captain of United States women's cricket team in 2011 Women's Cricket World Cup Qualifier. She made her international (List A) debut for United States against South Africa on 15 November 2011 in that tournament. Francis made her final international appearances at the 2011 World Cup Qualifier.
