= Mariam Agha =

Pakistani cricketer

Personal information
- Full name: Mariam Agha

International information
- National side: Pakistan
- ODI debut (cap 34): 21 March 2004 v West Indies
- Last ODI: 25 March 2004 v West Indies

Career statistics
| Competition | WODI |
|---|---|
| Matches | 3 |
| Runs scored | 5 |
| Batting average | 1.66 |
| 100s/50s | 0/0 |
| Top score | 2 |
| Balls bowled | 5 |
| Wickets | 0 |
| Bowling average | – |
| 5 wickets in innings | 0 |
| 10 wickets in match | 0 |
| Best bowling | 1/46 |
| Catches/stumpings | 0/– |
- Source: Cricinfo, 29 March 2024

Mariam Agha is a Pakistani former cricketer who played as a right-hand batter. She appeared in three One Day Internationals for Pakistan, all on West Indies tour of India and Pakistan in 2004. She made her Women's One Day International (WODI) debut against West Indies on 21 March 2004.
