= Saint Lucia women's national cricket team =

Saint Lucia

Team information
- Founded: First recorded match: 1988
- Dissolved: 2014

History
- First-class debut: Jamaica in 1988 at Queen's Park Oval, Port of Spain
- S50 wins: 2
- T20 Blaze wins: 0

The Saint Lucia women's national cricket team is the women's representative cricket team of the country of Saint Lucia. They competed in the West Indies women's domestic cricket structure between 1988 and 2014, after which they were replaced by the Windward Islands.

== History ==
Saint Lucia joined the West Indies domestic structure in 1988, playing in the Federation Championships. The full results of the season are not recorded. The side's most successful period came between 1994 and 2004, when they won two titles and finished as runners-up six times. In 1994, they lost the final of the knockout section of the tournament to Trinidad and Tobago women's national cricket team before missing out to the same team in the league section in 1996. The following season, 1998, brought Saint Lucia's first title as they beat Trinidad and Tobago in the final of the knockout section of the Championships by 1 wicket. They finished as runners-up again in 1999 before winning the league section of the tournament in 2002, with 5 wins from 6 matches. The side were runners-up in both league and knockout sections of the Championships in 2003, and lost the final of the knockout section in 2004.

Saint Lucia continued competing in the Championships until 2014, with less success. They also competed in the first two seasons of the Twenty20 Blaze in 2012 and 2013, finishing 7th in 2012 and bottom of their group in 2013. After 2014 Saint Lucia no longer competed in the domestic structure, with North Windward Islands and South Windward Islands competing in 2015 and a unified Windward Islands team, including Saint Lucia, competing from 2016 onwards.

== Players ==
=== Notable players ===
Players who played for Saint Lucia and played internationally are listed below, in order of first international appearance (given in brackets):

- (Cricket West Indies) Eugena Gregg (1993)
- (Cricket West Indies) Patricia Felicien (1993)
- (Cricket West Indies) Verena Felicien (1997)
- (Cricket West Indies) Roselyn Emmanuel (1997)
- (Cricket West Indies) Pamela Alfred (2003)
- (Cricket West Indies) Doris Francis (2003)
- (Cricket West Indies) Nadine George (2003)
- (Cricket West Indies) Glenicia James (2003)
- (Cricket West Indies) Philipa Thomas (2003)
- (Cricket West Indies) Qiana Joseph (2017)
- (Cricket West Indies) Nerissa Crafton (2024)

== Honours ==
- Women's Super50 Cup:
  - Winners (2): 1998, 2002 (League)
- Twenty20 Blaze:
  - Winners (0):
  - Best finish: 7th (2012)

== See also ==
- Windward Islands women's cricket team
- Saint Lucia national cricket team
