= Laudium Oval =

Cricket ground in Laudium, Gauteng, South Africa

Ground information
- Location: Pretoria, Laudium, Gauteng

International information
- First WODI: 22 February 2004: South Africa v England
- Last WODI: 20 January 2007: South Africa v Pakistan
- As of 7 September 2020; Source: CricketArchive

Laudium Oval is a cricket ground in Laudium, Gauteng, South Africa. The ground was used during the 2005 Women's Cricket World Cup, hosting five group-stage matches. It has also hosted two other women's One Day Internationals.
