= Jacqueline Robinson =

West Indian cricketer (1966–2005)

Personal information
- Full name: Jacqueline Robinson
- Born: 30 January 1966; Clarendon, Jamaica
- Died: 9 October 2005 (aged 39); Jamaica
- Batting: Right-handed
- Bowling: Right-arm medium-fast
- Role: All-rounder

International information
- National side: West Indies (1993–2004)
- Only Test (cap 28): 15 March 2004 v Pakistan
- ODI debut (cap 22): 20 July 1993 v India
- Last ODI: 2 April 2004 v Pakistan

Domestic team information
- Years: Team
- 1994–2004: Jamaica

Career statistics
Competition	WTest	WODI	WFC	WLA
Matches	1	16	3	30
Runs scored	65	127	68	454
Batting average	32.50	9.76	34.00	19.73
100s/50s	0/1	0/0	0/1	0/2
Top score	57	25	57	72*
Balls bowled	162	644	318	995
Wickets	0	7	3	20
Bowling average	–	52.71	60.66	28.95
5 wickets in innings	0	0	0	0
10 wickets in match	0	0	0	0
Best bowling	–	2/11	2/62	3/16
Catches/stumpings	0/–	3/–	0/–	4/–
- Source: CricketArchive, 15 December 2021

Jacqueline Robinson (30 January 1966 – 9 October 2005) was a Jamaican cricketer who played as an all-rounder, batting right-handed and bowling right-arm medium-fast. She appeared in one Test match and 16 One Day Internationals for the West Indies, appearing in 7 ODIs at the 1993 World Cup before playing the rest of her international matches in 2004, on a tour of India and Pakistan. She played domestic cricket for Jamaica.

She died aged 39 in October 2005. She had been hospitalized a month prior to her death before being discharged and returning to hospital again. A cause of death was not reported.
