= 2005 Women's Cricket World Cup =

Tournament in South Africa

- Dates: 22 March – 10 April 2005
- Administrator: International Women's Cricket Council
- Cricket format: Women's One Day International (50 overs)
- Tournament format(s): Round-robin and Knockout
- Host: South Africa
- Champions: Australia (5th title)
- Runners-up: India
- Participants: 8
- Matches: 31
- Player of the series: (Australia) Karen Rolton
- Most runs: (England) Charlotte Edwards (280)
- Most wickets: (India) Neetu David (20)

The 2005 Women's Cricket World Cup was the eighth Women's Cricket World Cup, held in South Africa from 22 March to 10 April 2005. It was the first edition of the tournament to be hosted by South Africa.

The World Cup was the final tournament organised by the International Women's Cricket Council before it was merged with the International Cricket Council. Australia won the tournament, their fifth title, comfortably beating India in the final, by 98 runs. England and New Zealand (the defending champion) were the losing semi-finalists, while the other four teams that competed were Ireland, South Africa, Sri Lanka and West Indies. Karen Rolton was named the Player of the Tournament after scoring 107* in the final of the tournament. Charlotte Edwards was the leading run-scorer in the tournament, Neetu David the leading wicket-taker and Karen Rolton the player of the series.

== Group stage ==
Pos	Team	Pld	W	L	T	NR	BP	Pts
1	Australia	7	5	0	0	2	4	35
2	India	7	4	1	0	2	4	30
3	New Zealand	7	4	1	0	2	3	29
4	England	7	3	2	0	2	5	26
5	West Indies	7	2	3	0	2	3	19
6	Sri Lanka	7	1	4	0	2	1	12
7	South Africa	7	1	4	0	2	0	11
8	Ireland	7	0	5	0	2	0	6

Source: ESPNCricinfo

=== Round 1 ===
22 March 2005
(scorecard)

England; 169/7 (50.0 overs)	v	Australia
Jenny Gunn 40 (50); Julie Hayes 2/32 (10.0)

No Result
Technikon Oval, Pretoria
Umpires: ZTA Ndamane and BM White

22 March 2005
(scorecard)

Sri Lanka; 116 (46.5 overs)	v	India; 4/0 (2.0 overs)
Shashikala Siriwardene 29 (63); Neetu David 3/17 (7.5)		Jaya Sharma 3 (6)

No Result
Laudium Oval, Pretoria
Umpires: SW Liebisch and D Ntuli

22 March 2005
Scorecard – ESPNcricinfo

South Africa; 204/7 (48.0 overs)	v	Ireland {{{score2}}}

No result
SuperSport Park, Centurion
Umpires: BN Harrison and GH Pienaar

22 March 2005
(scorecard)

New Zealand; 178/8 (50.0 overs)	v	West Indies; 18/2 (3.4 overs)
Maia Lewis 77 (144); Philipa Thomas 2/19 (7.0)		Nelly Williams 10 (9); Louise Milliken 1/4 (2.0)

No Result
Harlequins, Pretoria
Umpires: S George and DJ Smith

=== Round 2 ===
24 March 2005
(scorecard)

Australia; 174/7 (50.0 overs)	v	New Zealand; 142 (49.3 overs)
Alex Blackwell 53 (65); Rachel Pullar 2/30 (10.0)		Rebecca Rolls 60 (80); Karen Rolton 3/22 (10.0)

Australia won by 32 runs
LC de Villiers Oval, Pretoria
Umpires: BN Harrison and GH Pienaar

24 March 2005
(scorecard)

England; 284/4 (50.0 overs)	v	Sri Lanka; 70 (26.0 overs)
Claire Taylor 136 (128); Praba Udawatte 3/38 (10.0)		Praba Udawatte 8 (49); Lucy Pearson 3/26 (6.0)

England won by 214 runs
Harlequins, Pretoria
Umpires: SW Liebisch and S Zoutendyk

24 March 2005
(scorecard)

Ireland; 65 (42.1 overs)	v	India; 68/1 (17.2 overs)
Miriam Grealey 38 (88); Amita Sharma 3/12 (8.0)		Anju Jain 32* (60); Heather Whelan 1/17 (6.0)

India won by 9 wickets
Harlequins, Pretoria
Umpires: LM Engelbrecht and S George

24 March 2005
(scorecard)

South Africa; 169 (49.0 overs)	v	West Indies; 168 (49.4 overs)
Cri-Zelda Brits 72 (120); Philipa Thomas 4/42 (10.0)		Juliana Nero 41 (93); Cri-Zelda Brits 4/37 (9.4)

South Africa won by 1 run
Laudium Oval, Pretoria
Umpires: A Crafford and BM White

=== Round 3 ===
26 March 2005
(scorecard)

Australia; 230 (49.2 overs)	v	West Indies; 151 (48.3 overs)
Karen Rolton 69 (82); Envis Williams 3/38 (8.2)		Juliana Nero 40 (64); Lisa Sthalekar 2/16 (4.0)

Australia won by 79 runs
Olympia Park, Rustenburg
Umpires: ZTA Ndamane and DJ Smith

26 March 2005
(scorecard)

England; 221/6 (50.0 overs)	v	Ireland; 93/8 (50.0 overs)
Clare Connor 82 (114); Barbara McDonald 1/22 (10.0)		Clare Shillington 17 (48); Claire Taylor 2/13 (10.0)

England won by 128 runs
Eesterust Cricket Club Ground, Pretoria
Umpires: D Ntuli and BM White

26 March 2005
(scorecard)

South Africa; 80 (34.3 overs)	v	India; 81/6 (25.5 overs)
Johmari Logtenberg 26 (54); Deepa Marathe 4/1 (6.0)		Rumeli Dhar 33* (41); Alicia Smith 4/19 (10.0)

India won by 4 wickets
Technikon Oval, Pretoria
Umpires: S George and BN Harrison

26 March 2005
(scorecard)

Sri Lanka; 58 (34.3 overs)	v	New Zealand; 59/3 (18.4 overs)
Hiruka Fernando 16 (25); Helen Watson 2/0 (2.3)		Maia Lewis 20 (39); Praba Udawatte 2/27 (7.0)

New Zealand won by 7 wickets
Harlequins, Pretoria
Umpires: SW Liebisch and JEP Ostrom

=== Round 4 ===
28 March 2005
(scorecard)

Australia; 256/5 (50.0 overs)	v	South Africa; 159/9 (49.0 overs)
Lisa Keightley 103 (153); Johmari Logtenberg 2/38 (8.0)		Cri-Zelda Brits 49 (75); Shelley Nitschke 2/32 (8.0)

Australia won by 97 runs
LC de Villiers Oval, Pretoria
Umpires: LM Engelbrecht and JEP Ostrom

28 March 2005
(scorecard)

England; 139 (49.3 overs)	v	India; 141/3 (45.5 overs)
Charlotte Edwards 58 (121); Jhulan Goswami 4/27 (9.3)		Anjum Chopra 64 (119); Katherine Brunt 1/17 (7.5)

India won by 7 wickets
Laudium Oval, Pretoria
Umpires: A Crafford and EC Hendrikse

28 March 2005
(scorecard)

Ireland; 91 (49.0 overs)	v	New Zealand; 95/1 (18.2 overs)
Caitriona Beggs 30 (102); Helen Watson 3/19 (10.0)		Aimee Mason 49* (47); Heather Whelan 1/18 (5.0)

New Zealand won by 9 wickets
Harlequins, Pretoria
Umpires: GH Pienaar and S Zoutendyk

28 March 2005
(scorecard)

Sri Lanka; 152 (48.1 overs)	v	West Indies; 156/2 (39.2 overs)
Shashikala Siriwardene 52 (60); Verena Felicien 2/13 (8.0)		Nelly Williams 70 (124); Eshani Kaushalya 1/14 (3.2)

West Indies won by 8 wickets
Willowmoore Park, Benoni
Umpires: S George and BM White

=== Round 5 ===
30 March 2005
(scorecard)

Sri Lanka; 57 (38.2 overs)	v	Australia; 58/2 (16.4 overs)
Shashikala Siriwardene 14 (40); Shelley Nitschke 3/5 (6.0)		Lisa Keightley 23 (48); Shashikala Siriwardene 1/10 (3.0)

Australia won by 8 wickets
LC de Villiers Oval, Pretoria
Umpires: A Crafford and DJ Smith

30 March 2005
(scorecard)

South Africa; 174/6 (50.0 overs)	v	England; 180/2 (39.5 overs)
Cri-Zelda Brits 46 (104); Lucy Pearson 2/23 (10.0)		Charlotte Edwards 99 (133); Alicia Smith 2/35 (10.0)

England won by 8 wickets
Harlequins, Pretoria
Umpires: S George and BM White

30 March 2005
(scorecard)

New Zealand; 184/9 (50.0 overs)	v	India; 168/9 (50.0 overs)
Sara McGlashan 57 (73); Neetu David 5/32 (10.0)		Mithali Raj 52 (102); Louise Milliken 5/25 (10.0)

New Zealand won by 16 runs
Technikon Oval, Pretoria
Umpires: ZTA Ndamane and GH Pienaar

30 March 2005
(scorecard)

Ireland; 159/6 (50.0 overs)	v	West Indies; 163/2 (36.3 overs)
Cecelia Joyce 37 (75); Verena Felicien 2/22 (10.0)		Juliana Nero 71 (92); Heather Whelan 1/31 (8.0)

West Indies won by 8 wickets
Laudium Oval, Pretoria
Umpires: LM Engelbrecht and D Ntuli

=== Round 6 ===
1 April 2005
(scorecard)

Ireland; 66/8 (50.0 overs)	v	Australia; 68/0 (14.0 overs)
Miriam Grealey 21 (68); Cathryn Fitzpatrick 2/9 (10.0)		Belinda Clark 35* (44)

Australia won by 10 wickets
Eesterust Cricket Club Ground, Pretoria
Umpires: D Ntuli and BM White

1 April 2005
(scorecard)

England; 179/6 (50.0 overs)	v	New Zealand; 180/5 (48.5 overs)
Claire Taylor 46 (72); Louise Milliken 1/11 (4.0)		Haidee Tiffen 43 (65); Nicki Shaw 2/22 (5.0)

New Zealand won by 5 wickets
LC de Villiers Oval, Pretoria
Umpires: LM Engelbrecht and ZTA Ndamane

1 April 2005
(scorecard)

West Indies; 135 (47.4 overs)	v	India; 139/2 (33.0 overs)
Pamela Lavine 43 (77); Jhulan Goswami 4/16 (9.0)		Anju Jain 68 (92); Verena Felicien 2/31 (9.0)

India won by 8 wickets
Harlequins, Pretoria
Umpires: SW Liebisch and DJ Smith

1 April 2005
(scorecard)

Sri Lanka; 158 (47.4 overs)	v	South Africa; 126 (43.4 overs)
Hiruka Fernando 78* (137); Charlize van der Westhuizen 2/26 (10.0)		Johmari Logtenberg 39 (57); Suwini de Alwis 3/19 (6.4)

Sri Lanka won by 32 runs
Technikon Oval, Pretoria
Umpires: A Crafford and JEP Ostrom

=== Round 7 ===
3 April 2005
(scorecard)

India	v	Australia

Abandoned without a ball bowled
Laudium Oval, Pretoria
Umpires: SW Liebisch and GH Pienaar

3 April 2005
(scorecard)

England	v	West Indies

Abandoned without a ball bowled
Harlequins, Pretoria
Umpires: EC Hendrikse and JEP Ostrom

3 April 2005
Scorecard – ESPNcricinfo

Ireland {{{score1}}}	v	Sri Lanka {{{score2}}}

Abandoned without a ball bowled
Technikon Oval, Pretoria
Umpires: LM Engelbrecht and DJ Smith

3 April 2005
(scorecard)

South Africa	v	New Zealand

Abandoned without a ball bowled
LC de Villiers Oval, Pretoria
Umpires: ZTA Ndamane and BM White

== Knockout stage ==
=== Bracket ===
Semi-finals
4	England	158 (49.4 overs)
1	Australia	159/5 (47 overs)
2	India	204/6 (50 overs)
3	New Zealand	163 (43.4 overs)

Final
Australia	215/4 (50 overs)
India	117 (46 overs)

=== Semi-finals ===
5 April 2005
(scorecard)

England; 158 (49.4 overs)	v	Australia; 159/5 (47 overs)
Clare Connor 35 (74); Cathryn Fitzpatrick 3/27 (10 overs)		Belinda Clark 62 (105); Clare Connor 1/24 (10 overs)

Australia won by 5 wickets
Sedgars Park, Potchefstroom
Umpires: Zed Ndamane (SA) and Gerrie Pienaar (SA)
Player of the match: Belinda Clark (Aus)

- Australia won the toss and elected to field.

7 April 2005
(scorecard)

India; 204/6 (50 overs)	v	New Zealand; 164 (43.4 overs)
Mithali Raj 91* (104); Rachel Pullar 4/39 (10 overs)		Maria Fahey 73* (94); Amita Sharma 3/24 (9 overs)

India won by 40 runs
Sedgars Park, Potchefstroom
Umpires: Shaun George (SA) and Dennis Smith (SA)
Player of the match: Mithali Raj (Ind)

- New Zealand won the toss and elected to field.

=== Final ===
10 April 2005
(scorecard)

Australia; 215/4 (50 overs)	v	India; 117 (46 overs)
Karen Rolton 107* (128); Rumeli Dhar 1/34 (6 overs)		Anju Jain 29 (52); Shelley Nitschke 2/14 (9 overs)

Australia won by 98 runs
SuperSport Park, Centurion
Umpires: Shaun George (SA) and Zed Ndamane (SA)
Player of the match: Karen Rolton (Aus)

- Australia won the toss and elected to bat.

== Statistics ==
=== Most runs ===
The top five run-scorers are included in this table, ranked by runs scored, then by batting average, then alphabetically by surname.

Player	Team	Runs	Inns	Avg	Highest	100s	50s
Charlotte Edwards	England	280	6	46.66	99	0	3
Claire Taylor	England	265	6	53.00	136	1	1
Karen Rolton	Australia	246	5	61.50	107*	1	1
Cri-zelda Brits	South Africa	206	6	34.33	72	0	1
Mithali Raj	India	199	7	49.75	91*	0	2

Source: ESPNCricinfo

=== Most wickets ===
The top five wicket-takers are listed in this table, ranked by wickets taken and then by bowling average.

Player	Team	Overs	Wkts	Ave	SR	Econ	BBI
Neetu David	India	65.4	20	8.35	19.7	2.54	5/32
Amita Sharma	India	65.3	14	14.85	28.0	3.17	3/12
Jhulan Goswami	India	64.1	13	13.53	29.6	2.74	4/16
Shelley Nitschke	Australia	44.0	11	8.27	24.0	2.06	3/5
Louise Milliken	New Zealand	44.0	11	13.72	24.0	3.43	5/25

Source: ESPNCricinfo
