= Candacy Atkins =

Guyanese cricketer (born 1984)

Personal information
- Full name: Candacy Atkins
- Born: 13 February 1984 (age 42); New Amsterdam, Guyana
- Batting: Right-handed
- Bowling: Right-arm medium
- Role: Bowler

International information
- National sides: West Indies (2003–2004); United States (2019–present)
- Only Test (cap 19): 15 March 2004; West Indies v Pakistan
- ODI debut (cap 44): 16 March 2003; West Indies v Sri Lanka
- Last ODI: 2 April 2004; West Indies v Pakistan
- Only T20I (cap 12): 19 May 2019; United States v Canada

Domestic team information
- Years: Team
- 2002–2005: Guyana

Career statistics
Competition	WTest	WODI	WT20I	WLA
Matches	1	11	1	21
Runs scored	7	62	1	248
Batting average	7.00	10.33	1.00	17.71
100s/50s	0/0	0/0	0/0	0/0
Top score	6	19	1	47
Balls bowled	150	292	–	334
Wickets	1	4	–	8
Bowling average	56.00	42.75	–	29.75
5 wickets in innings	0	0	–	0
10 wickets in match	0	0	–	0
Best bowling	1/49	2/30	–	2/16
Catches/stumpings	1/–	0/–	0/–	0/2
- Source: CricketArchive, 9 June 2021

Candacy Atkins (born 13 February 1984) is a Guyanese cricketer who has represented the West Indies and the United States, playing primarily as a right-arm medium bowler. She represented the West Indies in one Test match and 11 One Day Internationals in 2003 and 2004, and played domestic cricket for Guyana between 2002 and 2005. In March 2019, she was named in the United States team for the 2019 ICC Women's Qualifier Americas tournament against Canada. She made her WT20I debut for the United States against Canada in the Americas Qualifier on 19 May 2019.

In February 2021, she was named in the Women's National Training Group by the USA Cricket Women's National Selectors ahead of the 2021 Women's Cricket World Cup Qualifier and the 2021 ICC Women's T20 World Cup Americas Qualifier tournaments.
