= Jillian Smythe =

Irish cricketer (born 1985)

Personal information
- Full name: Jillian Laura Weymouth Smythe
- Born: 19 December 1985 (age 40); Dublin, Ireland
- Batting: Right-handed
- Bowling: Right-arm medium
- Role: Bowler

International information
- National side: Ireland (2005–2006)
- ODI debut (cap 52): 24 March 2005 v India
- Last ODI: 29 July 2006 v India

Career statistics
| Competition | WODI | WLA |
|---|---|---|
| Matches | 7 | 11 |
| Runs scored | 39 | 50 |
| Batting average | 6.50 | 5.55 |
| 100s/50s | 0/0 | 0/0 |
| Top score | 21 | 21 |
| Balls bowled | 104 | 132 |
| Wickets | 0 | 2 |
| Bowling average | – | 69.50 |
| 5 wickets in innings | 0 | 0 |
| 10 wickets in match | 0 | 0 |
| Best bowling | – | 2/7 |
| Catches/stumpings | 0/– | 0/– |
- Source: CricketArchive, 22 April 2022

Jillian Laura Weymouth Smythe (born 19 December 1985) is an Irish former cricketer who played as a right-arm medium bowler. She appeared in seven One Day Internationals for Ireland in 2005 and 2006, including playing at the 2005 World Cup.
