= Verena Felicien =

Saint Lucian cricketer (born 1964)

Personal information
- Full name: Verena Marcelle Felicien
- Born: 12 November 1964 (age 62); Saint Lucia
- Batting: Right-handed
- Bowling: Right-arm off break
- Role: All-rounder

International information
- National side: West Indies (1997–2005)
- Only Test (cap 21): 15 March 2004 v Pakistan
- ODI debut (cap 29): 11 December 1997 v Sri Lanka
- Last ODI: 9 April 2005 v South Africa

Domestic team information
- Years: Team
- 1994–2012: Saint Lucia

Career statistics
| Competition | WTest | WODI | WLA | WT20 |
|---|---|---|---|---|
| Matches | 1 | 36 | 76 | 8 |
| Runs scored | 102 | 436 | 1,295 | 52 |
| Batting average | 51.00 | 17.44 | 27.55 | 10.40 |
| 100s/50s | 0/1 | 0/0 | 0/4 | 0/0 |
| Top score | 55 | 49 | 95* | 11* |
| Balls bowled | 222 | 1,791 | 2,679 | 150 |
| Wickets | 2 | 41 | 92 | 7 |
| Bowling average | 49.50 | 21.07 | 15.35 | 21.42 |
| 5 wickets in innings | 0 | 0 | 1 | 0 |
| 10 wickets in match | 0 | 0 | 0 | 0 |
| Best bowling | 1/16 | 4/21 | 5/12 | 2/10 |
| Catches/stumpings | 0/– | 3/– | 5/– | 1/– |
- Source: CricketArchive, 15 December 2021

Verena Marcelle Felicien (born 12 November 1964) is a Saint Lucian former cricketer who played as an all-rounder, batting right-handed and bowling right-arm off break. She appeared in one Test match and 36 One Day Internationals for the West Indies between 1997 and 2005, including playing at the 1997 World Cup in India and the 2005 World Cup in South Africa. She played domestic cricket for Saint Lucia.

Currently an employee of the National Insurance Corporation in Saint Lucia, Felicien started playing in 1982. A member of the club Toughest Wrecking Crew in her community of Ti Rocher, Castries, she led Saint Lucia to regional women's cricket titles from 1998 to 2003, and captained West Indies between 1998 and 2003. She was retained in the side which toured India and Pakistan in 2004, and remained part of the team until 2005. Felicien made scores of 55 and 47 in her sole Test, against Pakistan at Karachi in 2004.

Feleicien was named Saint Lucia's Sportswoman of the Year 1996 and 1998. Up to 2019, she remained active in cricket in Saint Lucia.

Her niece, Patricia Felicien, also played for the West Indies.
