= Nadine George =

West Indian cricketer

Nadine George MBE
Personal information
- Full name: Nadine Andrea Julietta George
- Born: 15 October 1968 (age 58); Jamaica
- Batting: Left-handed
- Role: Wicket-keeper

International information
- National side: West Indies (2003–2008)
- Only Test (cap 23): 15 March 2004 v Pakistan
- ODI debut (cap 38): 13 March 2003 v Sri Lanka
- Last ODI: 12 November 2008 v Sri Lanka
- T20I debut (cap 3): 27 June 2008 v Ireland
- Last T20I: 6 July 2008 v Netherlands

Domestic team information
- Years: Team
- 1994–2008: Saint Lucia
- 2010–2011: Trinidad and Tobago

Career statistics
| Competition | WTest | WODI | WT20I | WLA |
|---|---|---|---|---|
| Matches | 1 | 41 | 3 | 59 |
| Runs scored | 140 | 622 | 32 | 1,270 |
| Batting average | 70.00 | 16.81 | 10.66 | 24.90 |
| 100s/50s | 1/0 | 0/1 | 0/0 | 0/8 |
| Top score | 118 | 53 | 31 | 90 |
| Catches/stumpings | 1/0 | 8/1 | 0/4 | 11/1 |
- Source: CricketArchive, 1 June 2021

Nadine Andrea Julietta George MBE (born 15 October 1968) is a Jamaican former cricketer who played as a left-handed batter and wicket-keeper. She appeared in 1 Test match, 41 One Day Internationals and 3 Twenty20 Internationals for the West Indies between 2003 and 2008. She was the first West Indian woman cricketer to score a hundred in a Test match, scoring 118 on Test debut against Pakistan in Karachi in the third innings of the only Test on the tour. George was awarded an MBE for her contributions to sport. She played domestic cricket for Saint Lucia and Trinidad and Tobago.

George also kept wicket in her one Test match, where Pakistan notched up a 247-run first-innings lead and asked the West Indies to follow on. George's 118 helped her team to a second-innings total of 440, however, and Pakistan chose not to attempt the chase of 162 in 23 overs as the match was drawn.

George made her ODI debut aged 34 against Sri Lanka, opening the batting and making 16 in a 27-run loss. She played five of the six ODIs in the series, which the West Indies lost 0–6 – with 82 runs, she was the West Indies' third-best batswoman by runs and fifth-best by average.

She was retained for the 2003 IWCC Trophy, played in the Netherlands in July 2003, and made 114 runs at a batting average of 38 as the West Indies won four of five matches and qualified for the 2005 Women's Cricket World Cup. She made a new career highest score of 40 in the group match against Netherlands, in which the West Indians got what the Wisden Cricketers' Almanack described as a "surprise victory". With a loss in that match, and all other results equal, the West Indies would have finished third in the tournament and thus not qualified for the World Cup. With 114 runs, she made the most runs for the West Indies in that tournament.

George has played every ODI for West Indies since then, playing 12 on tour of the Indian subcontinent in 2003–04 – a tour which included a career highest score of 53, and George made 269 runs at an average of 22.41 on tour. In the 2005 World Cup, she was no longer the highest-scoring batter – her 72 runs came at an average of 12, behind Juliana Nero (197 runs), Pamela Lavine (145 runs) and Nelly Williams (121 runs) – but she could still celebrate two victories, over Sri Lanka (their first win over the Lankans, in their eighth attempt) and Ireland (to get revenge for the loss at the 2003 IWCC Trophy, when George got a duck and the West Indies were bowled out for 52 chasing 85 to win). The West Indies finished fifth – their best position at a World Cup ever – to qualify for the 2009 World Cup, and also beat South Africa 2–1 in an ODI series immediately following the World Cup. George made a combined total of 10 runs in the two wins, but was the only one to make it into double figures in the third ODI.

== Records ==
She is the oldest captain to play in WT20I history (at the age of 39 years and 265 days).

She is also the oldest captain to make captaincy debut in Women's T20I history (at the age of 39 years and 256 days).

She was also the first woman cricketer to keep wicket and to open the batting as captain in Women's Twenty20 International history.
