= Felicia Cummings =

Trinidadian cricketer (born 1968)

Personal information
- Full name: Felicia Gail Cummings
- Born: 20 February 1968 (age 58); Trinidad
- Batting: Right-handed
- Bowling: Slow left-arm orthodox
- Role: Bowler

International information
- National side: West Indies (2003–2005)
- Only Test (cap 20): 15 March 2004 v Pakistan
- ODI debut (cap 20): 21 June 2003 v Ireland
- Last ODI: 7 April 2005 v South Africa

Domestic team information
- Years: Team
- 1999–2005: Trinidad and Tobago

Career statistics
Competition	WTest	WODI	WLA
Matches	1	14	26
Runs scored	11	17	21
Batting average	5.50	4.25	3.50
100s/50s	0/0	0/0	0/0
Top score	6	7*	7*
Balls bowled	156	582	918
Wickets	4	12	33
Bowling average	15.00	28.83	18.36
5 wickets in innings	0	0	0
10 wickets in match	0	0	0
Best bowling	4/54	3/30	4/16
Catches/stumpings	1/–	1/–	2/–
- Source: CricketArchive, 7 June 2021

Felicia Gail Cummings (born 20 February 1968) is a Trinidadian former cricketer who played as a slow left-arm orthodox bowler. She appeared in 1 Test match and 14 One Day Internationals for the West Indies, and was part of their squad at the 2005 Women's Cricket World Cup. She played domestic cricket for Trinidad and Tobago.
