= Feroze Butt =

Pakistani cricket umpire (1942–2014)

Personal information
- Full name: Ferozeuddin Butt
- Born: 27 January 1942; Delhi, India
- Died: 5 September 2014 (aged 72); Karachi, Pakistan

Umpiring information
- Tests umpired: 1 (1990)
- ODIs umpired: 4 (1985–1994)
- WODIs umpired: 3 (2004)
- Source: ESPNcricinfo, 6 July 2013

Feroze Butt (27 January 1942 – 5 September 2014) was a Pakistani cricket umpire. He mainly umpired at the first-class level in domestic fixtures. He stood in one Test match, between Pakistan and New Zealand, in 1990 and four ODI games from 1985 to 1994.

== See also ==
- List of Test cricket umpires
- List of One Day International cricket umpires
