= Praba Udawatte =

Sri Lankan cricketer (born 1980)

Personal information
- Full name: Praba Malkanthi Udawatte
- Born: 4 October 1980 (age 46); Kandy, Sri Lanka
- Batting: Right-handed
- Bowling: Right-arm medium-fast
- Role: All-rounder

International information
- National side: Sri Lanka
- Source: Cricinfo, 11 May 2016

Praba Malkanthi Udawatte (born 4 October 1980 in Kandy, Sri Lanka) is a Sri Lankan former cricketer. She was a right-handed batsman as well as a right-arm medium-fast bowler.
