= Lonell de Beer =

South African cricketer (born 1980)

Personal information
- Full name: Lonell de Beer
- Born: 12 June 1980 (age 46); Pretoria, Transvaal, South Africa
- Batting: Right-handed
- Bowling: Right-arm leg break
- Role: Bowler

International information
- National side: South Africa (2005–2007)
- ODI debut (cap 41): 13 March 2005 v England
- Last ODI: 5 August 2007 v Netherlands

Domestic team information
- Years: Team
- 2003: Lancashire
- 2003/04–2007/08: Northerns
- 2004: Staffordshire

Career statistics
Competition	WODI	WLA
Matches	11	56
Runs scored	11	333
Batting average	3.66	10.74
100s/50s	0/0	0/0
Top score	6	41
Balls bowled	400	2,422
Wickets	9	62
Bowling average	25.55	19.22
5 wickets in innings	0	0
10 wickets in match	0	0
Best bowling	3/10	4/7
Catches/stumpings	4/–	20/–
- Source: CricketArchive, 11 April 2021

Lonell de Beer (born 12 June 1980) is a South African former cricketer who played as a right-arm leg break bowler. She appeared in 11 One Day Internationals for South Africa between 2005 and 2007. She played domestic cricket for Northerns, as well as stints with Lancashire and Staffordshire.
