= Philipa Thomas =

West Indies cricketer (born 1968)

Philipa Thomas-Eudovic
Personal information
- Full name: Philipa Thomas-Eudovic
- Born: 20 September 1968 (age 58); Saint Lucia
- Batting: Right-handed
- Bowling: Right-arm medium
- Role: Bowler

International information
- National side: West Indies (2003–2005)
- ODI debut (cap 46): 16 March 2003 v Sri Lanka
- Last ODI: 9 April 2005 v South Africa

Domestic team information
- Years: Team
- 2002–2011: Saint Lucia

Career statistics
Competition	WODI	WLA
Matches	26	49
Runs scored	173	367
Batting average	15.72	14.11
100s/50s	0/0	0/1
Top score	38	62
Balls bowled	1,167	1,728
Wickets	22	60
Bowling average	31.36	17.98
5 wickets in innings	0	1
10 wickets in match	0	0
Best bowling	4/42	6/24
Catches/stumpings	7/–	8/–
- Source: CricketArchive, 8 June 2021

Philipa Thomas-Eudovic (née Thomas; born 20 September 1968) is a Saint Lucian former cricketer who played primarily as a right-arm medium bowler. She appeared in played 26 One Day Internationals for the West Indies between 2003 and 2005, claiming 22 career WODI wickets. She played domestic cricket for Saint Lucia.
