= Pamela Lavine =

West Indies cricketer (born 1969)

Personal information
- Full name: Pamela Yvonne Lavine
- Born: 12 March 1969 (age 57); Barbados
- Batting: Right-handed
- Bowling: Right-arm medium-fast
- Role: All-rounder

International information
- National side: West Indies (2005–2010)
- ODI debut (cap 52): 22 March 2005 v New Zealand
- Last ODI: 20 April 2010 v Sri Lanka
- T20I debut (cap 17): 11 June 2009 v South Africa
- Last T20I: 14 May 2010 v New Zealand

Domestic team information
- Years: Team
- 2004–2013: Barbados

Career statistics
Competition	WODI	WT20I	WLA	WT20
Matches	24	15	52	28
Runs scored	548	202	1,428	385
Batting average	27.40	15.53	35.70	16.04
100s/50s	0/3	0/1	2/10	0/2
Top score	66*	61	109	64*
Balls bowled	836	190	1,185	419
Wickets	19	7	36	18
Bowling average	28.21	29.85	20.55	19.72
5 wickets in innings	0	0	0	0
10 wickets in match	0	0	0	0
Best bowling	4/17	4/21	4/17	4/21
Catches/stumpings	5/–	2/–	9/–	3/–
- Source: CricketArchive, 1 June 2021

Pamela Yvonne Lavine (born 12 March 1969) is a Barbadian former cricketer who played as an all-rounder, batting right-handed and bowling right-arm medium-fast. She appeared in 24 One Day Internationals and 15 Twenty20 Internationals for the West Indies between 2005 and 2010. She played domestic cricket for Barbados.
