= Stephanie Power =

West Indies cricketer

Personal information
- Full name: Stephanie Judith Power
- Born: 19 April 1957 (age 69); Trinidad
- Batting: Right-handed
- Role: Wicket-keeper

International information
- National side: West Indies (1993–2005)
- Only Test (cap 27): 15 March 2004 v Pakistan
- ODI debut (cap 28): 24 July 1993 v Australia
- Last ODI: 9 April 2005 v South Africa

Domestic team information
- Years: Team
- 1982–2005: Trinidad and Tobago

Career statistics
Competition	WTest	WODI	WFC	WLA
Matches	1	34	3	48
Runs scored	76	183	129	373
Batting average	38.00	8.31	32.25	13.32
100s/50s	0/1	0/0	0/1	0/1
Top score	57	28	57	62
Balls bowled	–	6	–	212
Wickets	–	0	–	6
Bowling average	–	–	–	9.50
5 wickets in innings	–	–	–	0
10 wickets in match	–	–	–	0
Best bowling	–	–	–	3/11
Catches/stumpings	0/–	18/11	0/–	22/17
- Source: CricketArchive, 15 December 2021

Stephanie Judith Power (born 19 April 1957) is a Trinidadian former cricketer who played as a wicket-keeper and right-handed batter West Indies cricketer. She appeared in one Test match and 34 One Day Internationals for the West Indies between 1993 and 2005, and captained the side between 2003 and 2005. She played domestic cricket for Trinidad and Tobago.

She also served as a member of the board of director for Copos Credit Union. In October 2015, she was inducted to the US Cricket Hall of Fame and became the first female inductee as well as first female international cricketer to be inducted to the US Cricket Hall of Fame.

== Biography ==
Stephanie started playing cricket since the age of eight while pursuing her primary education at the Hokett Baptist Primary School. During her childhood, she was considered as a tomboy. She also played for the girls' school team when she was studying at the St. Francis Girls' College. She is divorced and has one child. She teaches physical education at the San Juan North Secondary School for about 37 years. She also took a three-year break from cricket after giving birth to his only son Stephan in 1986. She received the honorary prestigious membership of the Atlantis Cricket Club in New York.

== International career ==
Stephanie was picked in the West Indies squad for the 1993 Women's Cricket World Cup as a second choice wicketkeeper. She subsequently made her WODI debut against Australia on 24 July 1993 during the World Cup tournament replacing first-choice wicketkeeper who was injured after the first match of the tournament. She became the captain of West Indies cricket team in 2003 at the age of 46 and became the oldest ever international captain on captaincy debut in any format. She captained the side in the 2003 World Cup qualifiers and under her captaincy West Indies emerged as runners-up to Ireland during the tournament. Subsequently, West Indies had also qualified for the 2005 Women's Cricket World Cup after missing out on 2000 Women's Cricket World Cup.

She made her test debut on 15 March 2004 in a one-off test match against Pakistan in Karachi at the age of 46 years and 334 days. She became the oldest ever player to feature in a women's test match. She subsequently captained the side on her test debut and went onto become the oldest ever woman to make her captaincy debut in a women's test match. She went onto register her maiden test fifty on her debut and since then she had never played another test match in her career.

She captained the West Indies national team for the first time in a World Cup tournament during the 2005 edition at the age of 47, which also marked her final World Cup tournament for West Indies in international cricket. Under her captaincy, West Indies finished at fifth place and she retired from international cricket after the 2005 World Cup. In 2006, she retired as the captain of Trinidad and Tobago team from domestic cricket.

Stephanie Power is the oldest player to play in WODI history when she achieved it during the 2005 World Cup match against hosts South Africa which was also incidentally her last ever international appearance for the West Indies (at the age of 47 years 355 days) and also became the oldest ever player to have appeared in a One Day International being either male or female surpassing the previous record of 47 years and 257 days held by Nolan Clarke.

She held the world record for being the oldest ever woman cricketer to have appeared in international cricket for 13 years until being surpassed by Caroline de Fouw of Netherlands who returned to Dutch national side after 10 years at the age of 52 during a match against the United Arab Emirates as part of the 2018 ICC Women's T20 World Cup qualifier.

== Coaching career ==
She is a certified Level II qualified coach and trainer for Level I and Level II coaches.

She had coaching stints in Trinidad and Tobago, Bermuda, Fort Lauderdale and New Jersey in 2008 and then in the United States of America in 2009. She has also conducted numerous coaching education programs in USA, Canada and in the Caribbean.

In 2009, she was appointed by the West Indies Women's Cricket Federation as the assistant coach of the West Indies women's cricket team for which Sherwin Campbell served as the head coach.

In August 2018, she also coached the Secondary Schools Cricket League girls' team in a tour of Canada.

She became the first and only female cricket trainer/tutor in the Americas region of the International Cricket Council.
