= Envis Williams =

West Indian cricketer (born 1962)

Personal information
- Full name: Envis Rebecca Williams
- Born: 8 October 1962 (age 64); Tobago
- Batting: Right-handed
- Bowling: Right-arm medium
- Role: Bowler

International information
- National side: West Indies (1997–2005)
- Only Test (cap 29): 15 March 2004 v Pakistan
- ODI debut (cap 33): 11 December 1997 v Sri Lanka
- Last ODI: 9 April 2005 v South Africa

Domestic team information
- Years: Team
- 1999–2005: Trinidad and Tobago

Career statistics
Competition	WTest	WODI	WLA
Matches	1	21	39
Runs scored	24	120	288
Batting average	12.00	10.00	15.15
100s/50s	0/0	0/0	0/0
Top score	13	28	45
Balls bowled	168	1,047	1,407
Wickets	2	18	45
Bowling average	25.50	28.22	16.51
5 wickets in innings	0	0	0
10 wickets in match	0	0	0
Best bowling	2/51	3/9	3/7
Catches/stumpings	0/—	7/—	8/–
- Source: CricketArchive, 14 December 2021

Envis Rebecca Williams (born 8 October 1962) is a Trinidadian former cricketer who played as a right-arm medium bowler. She appeared in one Test match and 21 One Day Internationals for the West Indies between 1997 and 2005. She played domestic cricket for Trinidad and Tobago.
