= Nelly Williams =

Trinidadian former cricketer (born 1980)

Personal information
- Full name: Nelly Andrea Williams
- Born: 16 August 1980 (age 46); Trinidad, Trinidad and Tobago
- Batting: Right-handed
- Bowling: Right-arm medium
- Role: Batter

International information
- National side: West Indies (2003–2005)
- ODI debut (cap 43): 13 March 2003 v Sri Lanka
- Last ODI: 9 April 2005 v South Africa

Domestic team information
- Years: Team
- 2001–2008: Trinidad and Tobago
- 2004: Lancashire

Career statistics
Competition	WODI	WLA
Matches	30	53
Runs scored	620	1,192
Batting average	25.83	29.07
100s/50s	0/3	0/9
Top score	82*	82*
Balls bowled	90	138
Wickets	3	4
Bowling average	29.33	33.00
5 wickets in innings	0	0
10 wickets in match	0	0
Best bowling	3/43	3/43
Catches/stumpings	5/—	9/–
- Source: CricketArchive, 11 April 2021

Nelly Andrea Williams (born 16 August 1980) is a Trinidadian former cricketer who played as a right-handed batter. She appeared in 30 One Day Internationals matches for the West Indies between 2003 and 2005. She played domestic cricket for Trinidad and Tobago, as well as spending one season with Lancashire.
