= West Indies women's cricket team =

West Indies women's national cricket team

West Indies
- Nickname: Windies
- Association: Cricket West Indies

Personnel
- Captain: Hayley Matthews
- Coach: Shane Deitz

International Cricket Council
- ICC status: Full member (1926)
- ICC region: Americas
ICC Rankings	Current	Best-ever
ODI	9th	5th (1 Oct 2015)
T20I	6th	5th

Tests
- First Test: v Australia at Jarrett Park, Montego Bay; 7–9 May 1976
- Last Test: v Pakistan at the National Stadium, Karachi; 15–18 March 2004
Tests	Played	Won/Lost
Total	12	1/3 (8 draws)
This year	0	0/0 (0 draws)

One Day Internationals
- First ODI: v England at Lensbury Sports Ground, London; 6 June 1979
- Last ODI: v Zimbabwe at Harare Sports Club, Harare; 30 September 2026
ODIs	Played	Won/Lost
Total	250	108/130 (3 ties, 9 no results)
This year	12	6/6 (0 ties, 0 no results)
- World Cup appearances: 6 (first in 1993)
- Best result: Runners-up (2013)
- Women's World Cup Qualifier appearances: 2 (first in 2003)
- Best result: Champions (2011)

T20 Internationals
- First T20I: v Ireland at Kenure, Dublin; 27 June 2008
- Last T20I: v Zimbabwe at Takashinga Cricket Club, Harare; 7 October 2026
T20Is	Played	Won/Lost
Total	209	104/94 (6 ties, 5 no results)
This year	19	8/9 (0 ties, 2 no results)
- T20 World Cup appearances: 8 (first in 2009)
- Best result: Champions (2016)
Test kit
ODI kit
T20I kit
- As of 7 October 2026

The West Indies women's cricket team, nicknamed the Windies, is a combined team of players from various countries in the Caribbean that competes in international women's cricket. The team is organised by the West Indies Cricket Board (WICB), a full member of the International Cricket Council (ICC), which represents fifteen countries and territories that once formed the British West Indies.

On 25 May 1973, the Caribbean Women’s Cricket Federation (CWCF) was founded, with Monica Taylor as the first president and Jean Carmino as General Secretary. Later in the same year, at the inaugural edition of the World Cup, two teams that now compete as part of the West Indies, Jamaica and Trinidad and Tobago, competed separately.

A combined West Indian women's team made its Test debut in 1976 (almost 50 years after its male counterpart), and its One Day International (ODI) in 1979.

In 1998, the CWCF changed its name to the West Indies Women’s Cricket Federation (WIWCF). On 16 January 2004, representatives of the WIWCF met with the president of the West Indies Cricket Board and agreed to a merger between the two organisations.

In 2005, the International Women's Cricket Council (IWCC), which had been the global governing body of women's cricket since 1958, merged with the ICC to form one unified body for men's and women's cricket. This saw West Indies women formally become a member of the ICC.

The West Indies currently competes in the ICC Women's Championship, the highest level of the sport, and has participated in five of the ten editions of the Women's Cricket World Cup held to date. At the 2013 World Cup, the team made the tournament's final for the first time, but lost to Australia. The Windies Women later reached the semifinals of the 2022 Women's Cricket World Cup.

At the ICC World Twenty20, the side only got to the semi-finals in the 2010, 2012, 2014, 2018 editions of the competition. The Windies Women eventually won their first title at the 2016 ICC Women's World Twenty20.

== History ==
=== Test history ===
The first Test series played by the West Indies was at home to Australia in 1975–76, when both the three-day matches were drawn. In 1976–77 the same team then played a six Test series away to India. They lost the fourth and then won the sixth Test by over an innings to level the series. The remaining games were drawn.

1979 then saw the Windies play their third Test series, this time away to England. However, they fared poorly, losing the first and third Tests and drawing the second to go down 2–0.

Finally, in 2003–04, after a 24-year wait, the West Indies resumed Test cricket with a one-off match away to Pakistan, this time played over 4 days. The result was a draw.

The ICC's Women’s Future Tours Programme for 2025-29 revealed that West Indies are set to play Test matches against Australia (in March 2026), England (April 2027) and South Africa (December 2028). These will be the first women's Test matches played by West Indies since the merger of the ICC and IWCC.

=== One-Day International history ===
When the first World Cup was played in 1973, the West Indies did not compete as an individual unit. Instead a separate team represented Jamaica, and another side represented Trinidad and Tobago. Additionally, three West Indian players participated in an International XI side that also competed in the 1973 World Cup. None of the teams fared well, however, with the International XI finishing in fourth place out of seven with a record of won three, lost two and one no result; Trinidad and Tobago finishing fifth with two wins and four losses; and Jamaica finishing sixth with one win, four losses and one match abandoned.

The first one-day internationals (ODIs) played by a combined West Indian side were two games away to England during their 1979 tour. Three ODIs were planned, but the second ODI was washed out without a ball being bowled. In the first ODI, England won comfortably by eight wickets, and in the third ODI the West Indies levelled the series with a two wicket win.

1993 saw West Indian players compete in a World Cup for the second time, this time as part of a combined team. They finished seventh, with only Denmark and the Netherlands below them, after winning only two and losing five of their seven matches. Their next games were in the 1997–98 World Cup, where they finished in ninth place, above only Denmark and Pakistan. The only match they won was the 9th place play-off game against the Danes.

2002–03 saw the Sri Lankan women's cricket team tour the West Indies and play a six-match ODI series, which the Sri Lankan's won six-nil. The closest match was the fourth, where the Windies went down by only 9 runs. 2003 saw the Windies greatest cricketing success, when they finished second in the International Women's Cricket Council Trophy, after winning four and losing one of their five games. The Trophy was competed for by the weaker ODI sides – Ireland, Windies, the Netherlands, Pakistan, Scotland and Japan.

2003–04 saw the Windies play five ODIs in India followed by a seven ODI and one Test tour to Pakistan. All five games against India were lost comfortably. As expected, the tour to Pakistan was more successful and the ODI series was won five-two.

They finished fifth in the 2004–05 World Cup, ahead of Sri Lanka, South Africa and Ireland, but behind Australia, India, New Zealand and India. They won two and lost three games, with one no result and one abandoned match. After being eliminated from the World Cup, the team stayed on to play three ODIs against South Africa and won the series two-nil.

== Tournament history ==
A red box around the year indicates tournaments played within West Indies

Key
Champions
Runners-up
Semi-finals

=== Women's Cricket World Cup ===
World Cup record
Year	Round	Position	Played	Won	Lost	Tie	NR
(England) 1973	Did not participate						
(India) 1978	Did not participate						
(New Zealand) 1982	Did not participate						
(Australia) 1988	Did not participate						
(England) 1993	Group Stage	6/8	7	2	5	0	0
(India) 1997	Group Stage	10/11	4	0	3	0	1
(New Zealand) 2000	Did not participate						
(South Africa) 2005	Group Stage	5/8	7	2	3	0	2
(Australia) 2009	Super 6s	6/8	8	1	7	0	0
(India) 2013	Runners-up	2/8	9	5	4	0	0
(England) 2017	Group Stage	6/8	7	2	5	0	0
(New Zealand) 2022	Semi-final	4/8	8	3	4	0	1
(India) 2025	Did not qualify						
Total	0 Title	-	50	15	31	0	4

=== ICC Women's World Twenty20 ===
T20 World Cup record
Year	Round	Position	Played	Won	Lost	Tie	NR
(England) 2009	Group Stage	5/8	3	1	2	0	0
(Cricket West Indies) 2010	Semi-final	4/8	4	2	2	0	0
(Sri Lanka) 2012	Semi-final	3/8	4	2	2	0	0
(Bangladesh) 2014	Semi-final	4/10	5	3	2	0	0
(India) 2016	Champions	1/10	6	5	1	0	0
(Cricket West Indies) 2018	Semi-final	3/10	5	4	1	0	0
(Australia) 2020	Group Stage	6/10	4	1	2	0	1
(South Africa) 2023	Group Stage	6/10	4	2	2	0	0
(United Arab Emirates) 2024	Semi-final	4/10	5	4	1	0	0
(England) 2026							
Total	1 Title	-	40	24	15	0	1

=== ICC Women's Cricket Challenge ===
- 2010: 1st place

== Honours ==
- Women's World Cup:
  - Runners-up (1): 2013
- Women's T20 World Cup:
  - Champions (1): 2016

== Squad ==
This lists all the active players who have either played for West Indies in the past 12 months, was named in the most recent ODI or T20I squad, or is Centrally contracted by Cricket West Indies.

Uncapped players are listed in italics.

Name	Age	Batting style	Bowling style	Contract	Forms	Notes
Batters
(Jamaica) Chedean Nation	40	Right-handed	-	Retainer	ODI, T20I	
(Trinidad and Tobago) Djenaba Joseph	22	Right-handed	Right-arm medium		ODI, T20I	
(Guyana) Mandy Mangru	27	Right-handed	Right-arm off break	Developmental	ODI, T20I	
All-rounders
(Barbados) Hayley Matthews	28	Right-handed	Right-arm off break	Retainer	ODI, T20I	Captain
(Jamaica) Chinelle Henry	31	Right-handed	Right-arm medium-fast	Retainer	ODI, T20I	
(Barbados) Aaliyah Alleyne	32	Right-handed	Right-arm medium	Retainer	ODI, T20I	
(Jamaica) Stafanie Taylor	35	Right-handed	Right-arm off break	Retainer	ODI, T20I	
(Guyana) Shabika Gajnabi	26	Right-handed	Right-arm medium	Retainer	ODI, T20I	
(Saint Lucia) Zaida James	22	Left-handed	Slow left arm orthodox		ODI, T20I	
Wicket-keepers
(Jamaica) Rashada Williams	29	Right-handed		Developmental	ODI, T20I	
(Guyana) Shemaine Campbelle	34	Right-handed	-	Retainer	ODI, T20I	Vice-captain
(Barbados) Kycia Knight	34	Left-handed	-		ODI, T20I	
(Trinidad and Tobago) Shunelle Sawh	22	Right-handed	-		ODI	
Spin Bowlers
(Grenada) Afy Fletcher	39	Right-handed	Right-arm leg break	Retainer	ODI, T20I	
(Trinidad and Tobago) Karishma Ramharack	31	Left-handed	Right-arm off break	Retainer	ODI, T20I	
(Trinidad and Tobago) Anisa Mohammed	38	Right-handed	Right-arm off break	Retainer		
(Guyana) Kaysia Schultz	29	Right-handed	Slow left arm orthodox	Developmental		
(Saint Lucia) Qiana Joseph	25	Left-handed	Slow left arm orthodox		ODI, T20I	
(Guyana) Ashmini Munisar	22	Right-handed	Right-arm off break		ODI, T20I	
Pace Bowlers
(Barbados) Shamilia Connell	34	Right-handed	Right-arm fast	Retainer	ODI, T20I	
(Barbados) Shakera Selman	37	Right-handed	Right-arm medium-fast	Retainer	ODI	
(Guyana) Cherry-Ann Fraser	27	Left-handed	Right-arm fast-medium	Developmental	ODI, T20I	
(Saint Vincent and the Grenadines) Jannillea Glasgow		Left-handed	Right-arm medium	Developmental		

Updated as on 8 July 2023

Note - Deandra Dottin is also awarded a central contract.

== Coaching staff ==
- Team Manager: Evril Betty Lewis
- Head coach: Shane Deitz
- Assistant coach: Courtney Walsh
- Assistant coach: Rayon Griffith
- Physiotherapist: Marita Marshall
- Strength and conditioning Coach: Shayne Cooper (coach)|Shayne Cooper
- Team Psychologist: Olivia Rose Esperance
- Team Analyst: Gary Belle
- Team Media Officer: Nassira Mohammed

== Records ==
=== Test cricket ===
- Highest team total: 440 v Pakistan, 15 March 2004 at National Stadium, Karachi, Pakistan
- Highest individual innings: 118, Nadine George v Pakistan, 15 March 2004 at National Stadium, Karachi, Pakistan
- Best innings bowling: 5/48, Vivalyn Latty-Scott v Australia, 7 May 1976 at Montego Bay, Jamaica
- Best match bowling: 5/26, Peggy Fairweather v India, 27 November 1976 at Jammu, India

=== ODI cricket ===
- Highest team total: 368/8 v Sri Lanka, 3 February 2013 at Mumbai, India
- Highest individual innings: 171, Stafanie Taylor v Sri Lanka, 3 February 2013 at Mumbai, India
- Best innings bowling: 5/36, Cherry-Ann Singh v Ireland, 29 July 1993 at Dorking, England

=== T20I cricket ===
- Highest team total: 191/4 v Netherlands, 16 October 2010 at Potchefstroom, South Africa

== See also ==
- Women's cricket
- List of West Indies women Test cricketers
- List of West Indies women ODI cricketers
- List of West Indies women Twenty20 International cricketers
- West Indian men's cricket team
