= Pakistan women's cricket team in Sri Lanka in 1997–98 =

| | Sri Lanka | Pakistan |
- Dates: 11 – 17 April 1998
| Captains | Rasanjali Silva | Shaiza Khan |

Test series
- Result: Sri Lanka won the 1-match series 1–0
| Most runs | Chamani Seneviratna (148) | Kiran Baluch (84) |
| Most wickets | Rasanjali Silva (8) | Shaiza Khan (6) |

One Day International series
- Results: Sri Lanka won the 3-match series 3–0
| Most runs | Vasanthi Ratnayake (103) | Asma Farzand (110) |
| Most wickets | Gayathri Kariyawasam (6) | Shaiza Khan (5) |

The Pakistan women's national cricket team toured Sri Lanka in April 1998. They played Sri Lanka in three One Day Internationals and one Test match, losing all four matches. The Test match was the first ever played in the format by either side, and the only one that has ever been played by Sri Lanka.

== Squads ==
| Sri Lanka | Pakistan |
|---|---|
| Rasanjali Silva (c); Vanessa Bowen; Thanuga Ekanayake (wk); Hiruka Fernando; Rose Fernando; Dedunu Gunaratne; Gayathri Kariyawasam; Chandrika Lakmalee; Kalpana Liyanarachchi (wk); Ramani Perera; Vasanthi Ratnayake; Chamani Seneviratna; Chaturi Thalagalage | Shaiza Khan (c); Kiran Baluch; Sadia Butt; Asma Farzand (wk); Shazia Hassan; Mahewish Khan; Muqudos Khan; Sharmeen Khan; Nazia Nazir; Nazia Sadiq; Deebah Sherazi |

== WODI Series ==
=== 1st ODI ===
11 April 1998
Scorecard

| Pakistan; 135 (34.4 overs) | v | Sri Lanka; 136/3 (25.4 overs) |
| Asma Farzand 30 (–); Rose Fernando 4/17 (9.4 overs) | | Vasanthi Ratnayake 48 (75); Deebah Sherazi 1/12 (2 overs) |

Sri Lanka Women won by 7 wickets
Singhalese Sports Club Cricket Ground, Colombo
Umpires: Christy Silva (SL) and Garth Cuddumbey (SA)

- Sri Lanka Women won the toss and elected to field.
- Mahewish Khan, Muqudos Khan (Pak), Chandrika Lakmalee and Chaturi Thalagalage (SL) all made their WODI debuts.

=== 2nd ODI ===
13 April 1998
Scorecard

| Pakistan; 157 (49.1 overs) | v | Sri Lanka; 158/6 (35.1 overs) |
| Nazia Sadiq 37 (90); Gayathri Kariyawasam 3/26 (11 overs) | | Dedunu Gunaratne 57* (98); Shaiza Khan 4/46 (10 overs) |

Sri Lanka Women won by 4 wickets
Moors Sports Club Ground, Colombo
Umpires: Somasiri Dissanayake (SL) and Tissa Kudahetti (SL)

- Pakistan Women won the toss and elected to bat.

=== 3rd ODI ===
15 April 1998
Scorecard

| Pakistan; 120/6 (31 overs) | v | Sri Lanka; 121/4 (26.2 overs) |
| Asma Farzand 60 (73); Chamani Seneviratna 2/17 (6 overs) | | Vasanthi Ratnayake 47 (40); Nazia Nazir 1/10 (3 overs) |

Sri Lanka Women won by 6 wickets
Moors Sports Club Ground, Colombo
Umpires: BK Ramachandra (SL) and DWJ Boteju (SL)

- Pakistan Women won the toss and elected to bat.
- Match reduced to 31 overs per side due to rain.

== Only WTest ==
17 – 20 April 1998
Scorecard

| Sri Lanka | v | Pakistan |
| 305/9d (96.1 overs); Vanessa Bowen 78 (–); Sharmeen Khan 3/23 (8.1 overs) | | 171 (82 overs); Kiran Baluch 76 (–); Chamani Seneviratna 5/31 (24 overs) |
| 275/8d (68 overs); Chamani Seneviratna 105* (–); Nazia Nazir 4/66 (15 overs) | | 100 (49.5 overs); Asma Farzand 20 (–); Rasanjali Silva 4/27 (22 overs) |

Sri Lanka Women won by 309 runs
Colts Cricket Club Ground, Colombo
Umpires: Bennet Gunawardene (SL) and PU Ariyawansa (SL)

- Sri Lanka Women won the toss and elected to bat.
- Shaiza Khan, Kiran Baluch, Sadia Butt, Asma Farzand, Shazia Hassan, Mahewish Khan, Muqudos Khan, Sharmeen Khan, Nazia Nazir, Nazia Sadiq, Deebah Sherazi (Pak), Rasanjali Silva, Vanessa Bowen, Thanuga Ekanayake, Rose Fernando, Dedunu Gunaratne, Chandrika Lakmalee, Kalpana Liyanarachchi, Ramani Perera, Vasanthi Ratnayake, Chamani Seneviratna and Chaturi Thalagalage (SL) all made their WTest debuts.
