= Netherlands women's cricket team in Sri Lanka in 1997–98 =

	Sri Lanka	Netherlands
- Dates: 25 November – 30 November 1997
Captains	Vanessa Bowen	Pauline te Beest

One Day International series
- Results: Netherlands won the 3-match series 2–1
Most runs	Vanessa Bowen (54)	Nicola Payne (69)
Most wickets	Rasanjali Silva (6)	Cheraldine Oudolf (5)

The Netherlands women's national cricket team toured Sri Lanka in November 1997. They played Sri Lanka in 3 One Day Internationals, winning the series 2–1. These were the first ever international matches played by the Sri Lanka women's cricket team.

== Squads ==
Sri Lanka	Netherlands
Vanessa Bowen (c); Ganga de Silva; Thanuga Ekanayake (wk); Hiruka Fernando; Rose Fernando; Thalika Gunaratne; Dona Indralatha; Kalpana Liyanarachchi; Gayathri Kariyawasam; Ramani Perera; Vasanthi Ratnayake; Chamani Seneviratna; Rasanjali Silva; Suthershini Sivanantham	Pauline te Beest (c); Caroline de Fouw; Jiska Howard; Edmee Janss; Maartje Köster; Sandra Kottman; Cheraldine Oudolf; Nicola Payne; Caroline Rambaldo; Elise Reynolds; Carolien Salomons; Maaike Schroeder (wk); Ariette van Noortwijk; Kirsten Zorab

== WODI Series ==
=== 1st ODI ===
25 November 1997
Scorecard

Netherlands; 132/9 (45 overs)	v	Sri Lanka; 113 (40 overs)
Ariette van Noortwijk 23 (–); Chamani Seneviratna 2/23 (8 overs)		Vanessa Bowen 27 (–); Caroline de Fouw 3/25 (9 overs)

Netherlands Women won by 19 runs
Singhalese Sports Club Cricket Ground, Colombo
Umpires: Somasiri Dissanayake (SL) and Tissa Kudahetti (SL)

- Netherlands Women won the toss and elected to bat.
- Match reduced to 45 overs per side due to rain.
- Maaike Schroeder (Net), Vanessa Bowen, Thanuga Ekanayake, Hiruka Fernando, Thalika Gunaratne, Dona Indralatha, Gayathri Kariyawasam, Ramani Perera, Vasanthi Ratnayake, Chamani Seneviratna, Rasanjali Silva and Suthershini Sivanantham (SL) all made their WODI debuts.

=== 2nd ODI ===
29 November 1997
Scorecard

Netherlands; 87 (38.1 overs)	v	Sri Lanka; 88/5 (42.5 overs)
Nicola Payne 11 (–); Rasanjali Silva 4/16 (8 overs)		Chamani Seneviratna 30* (–); Sandra Kottman 2/8 (5 overs)

Sri Lanka Women won by 5 wickets
Asgiriya Stadium, Kandy

- Sri Lanka Women won the toss and elected to field.
- Kalpana Liyanarachchi (SL) made her WODI debut.

=== 2nd ODI ===
30 November 1997
Scorecard

Sri Lanka; 65 (43.5 overs)	v	Netherlands; 66/0 (21.5 overs)
Dona Indralatha 10 (–); Cheraldine Oudolf 5/20 (8 overs)		Nicola Payne 45* (–)

Netherlands Women won by 10 wickets
Asgiriya Stadium, Kandy

- Netherlands Women won the toss and elected to field.
- Kirsten Zorab (Net), Ganga de Silva and Rose Fernando (SL) all made their WODI debuts.
