= Pakistan women's cricket team in Sri Lanka in 2001–02 =

	Sri Lanka	Pakistan
- Dates: 20 – 30 January 2002
Captains	Suthershini Sivanantham	Shaiza Khan

One Day International series
- Results: Sri Lanka won the 6-match series 6–0
Most runs	Vasanthi Ratnayake (239)	Sajjida Shah (91)
Most wickets	Rose Fernando (13)	Sharmeen Khan (8)

The Pakistan women's national cricket team toured Sri Lanka in January 2002. They played Sri Lanka in six One Day Internationals, with Sri Lanka winning the series 6–0.

== Squads ==
Sri Lanka	Pakistan
Suthershini Sivanantham (c); Hiroshi Abeysinghe; Sandamali Dolawatte; Thanuga Ekanayake (wk); Hiruka Fernando; Rose Fernando; Inoka Galagedara; Randika Galhenage; Indika Kankanange; Gayathri Kariyawasam; Janakanthy Mala; Ramani Perera; Lalana Priyadarshani; Vasanthi Ratnayake; Chamani Seneviratna	Shaiza Khan (c); Kiran Baluch; Batool Fatima; Uzma Gondal (wk); Khursheed Jabeen; Rabia Khan; Sharmeen Khan; Nazia Nazir; Sabeen Rezvi; Sajjida Shah; Huda Ziad

== WODI Series ==
=== 1st ODI ===
20 January 2002
Scorecard

Sri Lanka; 192/5 (45 overs)	v	Pakistan; 69 (38.4 overs)
Hiroshi Abeysinghe 57 (65); Sharmeen Khan 3/42 (9 overs)		Kiran Baluch 14 (56); Rose Fernando 4/3 (8.4 overs)

Sri Lanka Women won by 123 runs
Paikiasothy Saravanamuttu Stadium, Colombo
Umpires: Somasiri Dissanayake (SL) and Thassim Junkeer (SL)

- Sri Lanka Women won the toss and elected to bat.
- Match reduced to 45 overs per side due to rain.
- Sabeen Rezvi (Pak) and Sandamali Dolawatte (SL) both made their WODI debuts.

=== 2nd ODI ===
22 January 2002
Scorecard

Sri Lanka; 182/8 (50 overs)	v	Pakistan; 78 (43.3 overs)
Suthershini Sivanantham 36 (51); Shaiza Khan 3/42 (10 overs)		Rabia Khan 16 (32); Suthershini Sivanantham 5/2 (9.3 overs)

Sri Lanka Women won by 104 runs
Moors Sports Club Ground, Colombo
Umpires: MCS Salgado (SL) and S Hewavitharana (SL)

- Sri Lanka Women won the toss and elected to bat.

=== 3rd ODI ===
23 January 2002
Scorecard

Sri Lanka; 217/3 (50 overs)	v	Pakistan; 88 (46 overs)
Vasanthi Ratnayake 88 (130); Nazia Nazir 1/20 (5 overs)		Kiran Baluch 22 (57); Rose Fernando 4/15 (10 overs)

Sri Lanka Women won by 129 runs
Moors Sports Club Ground, Colombo
Umpires: JG Pushparajah (SL) and Karunaratne Boteju (SL)

- Pakistan Women won the toss and elected to field.
- Randika Galhenage and Lalana Priyadarshani (SL) both made their WODI debuts.

=== 4th ODI ===
27 January 2002
Scorecard

Sri Lanka; 216/5 (50 overs)	v	Pakistan; 61 (35.4 overs)
Hiroshi Abeysinghe 71* (103); Rabia Khan 1/8 (2 overs)		Sajjida Shah 29* (80); Ramani Perera 4/18 (7.4 overs)

Sri Lanka Women won by 155 runs
Asgiriya Stadium, Kandy
Umpires: K Lalith (SL) and NB Eriyagama (SL)

- Sri Lanka Women won the toss and elected to bat.

=== 5th ODI ===
29 January 2002
Scorecard

Sri Lanka; 119 (39.2 overs)	v	Pakistan; 77 (32.4 overs)
Vasanthi Ratnayake 27 (42); Rabia Khan 3/13 (8 overs)		Nazia Nazir 30 (55); Janakanthy Mala 4/3 (3 overs)

Sri Lanka Women won by 42 runs
Moors Sports Club Ground, Colombo
Umpires: Philip Mendis (SL) and Thassim Junkeer (SL)

- Sri Lanka Women won the toss and elected to bat.
- Match reduced to 40 overs per side due to rain.
- Inoka Galagedara (SL) made her WODI debut.

=== 6th ODI ===
30 January 2002
Scorecard

Pakistan; 86/7 (40 overs)	v	Sri Lanka; 87/3 (22.1 overs)
Sajjida Shah 36 (121); Indika Kankanange 2/15 (6 overs)		Vasanthi Ratnayake 51 (59); Nazia Nazir 1/2 (2.1 overs)

Sri Lanka Women won by 7 wickets
De Soysa Stadium, Moratuwa
Umpires: Dilshan de Silva (SL) and SH Sarathkumara (SL)

- Pakistan Women won the toss and elected to bat.
- Match reduced to 40 overs per side due to rain.
