= Sri Lanka women's cricket team in the West Indies in 2002–03 =

	West Indies	Sri Lanka
- Dates: 11 – 23 March 2003
Captains	Verena Felicien	Suthershini Sivanantham

One Day International series
- Results: Sri Lanka won the 6-match series 6–0
Most runs	Glenicia James (116)	Vasanthi Ratnayake (161)
Most wickets	Verena Felicien (8)	Suthershini Sivanantham (15)

The Sri Lanka women's cricket team toured the West Indies in March 2003. They played the West Indies in six One Day Internationals, winning all six to take the series 6–0.

== Squads ==
West Indies	Sri Lanka
Verena Felicien (c); Pamela Alfred; Candacy Atkins; Shane de Silva; Doris Francis; Nadine George (wk); Geneille Greaves; Clea Hoyte; Glenicia James; Debbie-Ann Lewis; Juliana Nero (wk); Stephanie Power; Susan Redhead; Brenda Solzano-Rodney (wk); Philipa Thomas; Nelly Williams	Suthershini Sivanantham (c); Hiroshi Abeysinghe; Sandamali Dolawatte; Thanuga Ekanayake (wk); Hiruka Fernando; Rose Fernando; Randika Galhenage; Dona Indralatha; Indika Kankanange; Gayathri Kariyawasam; Vasanthi Ratnayake; Chamani Seneviratna; Shashikala Siriwardene

== Tour Matches ==
=== 50-over match: Saint Vincent and the Grenadines v Sri Lanka ===
11 March 2003
Scorecard

Sri Lanka; 199/9 (50 overs)	v	Saint Vincent and the Grenadines; 131 (43.1 overs)
Hiroshi Abeysinghe 43 (–); Jennifer Charles 4/25 (9.5 overs)		Geneille Greaves 28 (–); Suthershini Sivanantham 5/21 (10 overs)

Sri Lanka Women won by 68 runs
Arnos Vale Playing Field, Arnos Vale, Saint Vincent
Umpires: S Holder (WI) and I Williams (WI)

- Saint Vincent and the Grenadines Women won the toss and elected to field.

=== 50-over match: Trinidad and Tobago v Sri Lanka ===
15 March 2003
Scorecard

Sri Lanka; 226/4 (50 overs)	v	Trinidad and Tobago; 115 (37 overs)
Vasanthi Ratnayake 77 (–); Shane de Silva 2/25 (7 overs)		Rona Rajkumar 25* (–); Sandamali Dolawatte 5/29 (9 overs)

Sri Lanka Women won by 111 runs
Penal, Trinidad
Umpires: Annemarie Dookie-Dowlath (WI) and Feroza Shah (WI)

- Sri Lanka Women won the toss and elected to bat.

== WODI Series ==
=== 1st ODI ===
13 March 2003
Scorecard

Sri Lanka; 193/9 (50 overs)	v	West Indies; 166/8 (50 overs)
Chamani Seneviratna 37 (–); Nelly Williams 3/43 (9 overs)		Shane de Silva 38* (–); Shashikala Siriwardene 2/20 (8 overs)

Sri Lanka Women won by 27 runs
Arnos Vale Playing Field, Arnos Vale, Saint Vincent and the Grenadines
Umpires: L Grant (WI) and O Nanton (WI)

- Sri Lanka Women won the toss and elected to bat.
- Shashikala Siriwardene (SL), Pamela Alfred, Shane de Silva, Doris Francis, Nadine George, Glenicia James, Debbie-Ann Lewis, Juliana Nero and Nelly Williams (WI) all made their WODI debuts.

=== 2nd ODI ===
16 March 2003
Scorecard

West Indies; 153 (49.3 overs)	v	Sri Lanka; 154/3 (41.4 overs)
Glenicia James 46 (–); Sandamali Dolawatte 4/25 (10 overs)		Hiruka Fernando 42* (–); Verena Felicien 1/20 (9 overs)

Sri Lanka Women won by 7 wickets
National Cricket Centre, Couva, Trinidad
Umpires: AMD Dowlat (WI) and D Ali (WI)

- West Indies Women won the toss and elected to bat.
- Candacy Atkins, Susan Redhead and Philipa Thomas (WI) all made their WODI debuts.

=== 3rd ODI ===
18 March 2003
Scorecard

Sri Lanka; 214 (49.2 overs)	v	West Indies; 176/9 (50 overs)
Chamani Seneviratna 40 (–); Juliana Nero 3/25 (4 overs)		Pamela Alfred 40 (–); Suthershini Sivanantham 3/26 (10 overs)

Sri Lanka Women won by 38 runs
Queen's Park Oval, Port of Spain, Trinidad
Umpires: D Joseph (WI) and Z Khan (WI)

- Sri Lanka Women won the toss and elected to bat.
- Geneille Greaves (WI) made her WODI debut.

=== 4th ODI ===
20 March 2003
Scorecard

Sri Lanka; 147 (48.3 overs)	v	West Indies; 138 (43 overs)
Hiruka Fernando 35 (–); Shane de Silva 2/17 (5.3 overs)		Shane de Silva 30 (–); Rose Fernando 3/18 (10 overs)

Sri Lanka Women won by 9 runs
Arnos Vale Playing Field, Arnos Vale, Saint Vincent and the Grenadines
Umpires: CM Donald (WI) and I Williams (WI)

- Sri Lanka Women won the toss and elected to bat.
- Clea Hoyte (WI) made her WODI debut.

=== 5th ODI ===
22 March 2003
Scorecard

West Indies; 77 (36.2 overs)	v	Sri Lanka; 80/2 (22 overs)
Glenicia James 27 (–); Sandamali Dolawatte 5/16 (8 overs)		Hiruka Fernando 39* (–); Doris Francis 1/13 (3 overs)

Sri Lanka Women won by 8 wickets
Arnos Vale Playing Field, Arnos Vale, Saint Vincent and the Grenadines
Umpires: Gary White (WI) and Selwyn Allen (WI)

- West Indies Women won the toss and elected to bat.

=== 6th ODI ===
23 March 2003
Scorecard

West Indies; 141/9 (50 overs)	v	Sri Lanka; 142/3 (34.3 overs)
Brenda Solzano-Rodney 42 (–); Suthershini Sivanantham 3/30 (10 overs)		Vasanthi Ratnayake 67* (–); Verena Felicien 2/39 (10 overs)

Sri Lanka Women won by 7 wickets
Arnos Vale Playing Field, Arnos Vale, Saint Vincent and the Grenadines
Umpires: O Nanton (WI) and S Holder (WI)

- Sri Lanka Women won the toss and elected to field.
