= England women's cricket team in India and Sri Lanka in 2005–06 =

English women's cricket team in Sri Lanka in 2005–06
| | Sri Lanka | England |
- Dates: 10 – 12 November 2005
| Captains | Sandamali Dolawatte | Charlotte Edwards |

One Day International series
- Results: England won the 2-match series 2–0
| Most runs | Suwini de Alwis (33) | Laura Newton (119) |
| Most wickets | Praba Udawatte (4) | Rosalie Birch (8) |

The English women's cricket team toured Sri Lanka and India in November and December 2005. Against Sri Lanka, they played two One Day Internationals, winning the series 2–0. Against India, they played one Test match and 5 ODIs. The Test match was drawn, whilst India won the ODI series 4–1.

== Tour of Sri Lanka ==
=== Squads ===
| Sri Lanka | England |
|---|---|
| Sandamali Dolawatte (c); Hiroshi Abeysinghe; WA Chandrawathi; Suwini de Alwis; Dumila Dedunu (wk); Sumudu Fernando; Inoka Galagedara; Randika Galhenage (wk); Dona Indralatha; Eshani Lokusuriyage; Janakanthy Mala; Chamari Polgampola; Dedunu Silva; Praba Udawatte | Charlotte Edwards (c); Caroline Atkins; Rosalie Birch; Arran Brindle; Katherine Brunt; Lydia Greenway; Isa Guha; Jenny Gunn; Laura Harper; Beth Morgan; Laura Newton; Nicky Shaw; Jane Smit (wk); Claire Taylor; Jo Watts |

=== WODI Series ===
==== 1st ODI ====
10 November 2005
Scorecard

| England; 224/4 (50 overs) | v | Sri Lanka; 61 (29.4 overs) |
| Arran Brindle 64* (57); Praba Udawatte 2/27 (10 overs) | | Hiroshi Abeysinghe 19* (68); Rosalie Birch 4/14 (9 overs) |

England Women won by 163 runs
Colts Cricket Club Ground, Colombo
Umpires: CBC Rodrigo (SL) and Philip Mendis (SL)

- England Women won the toss and elected to bat.
- Sumudu Fernando (SL) made her WODI debut.

==== 2nd ODI ====
12 November 2005
Scorecard

| England; 206/9 (50 overs) | v | Sri Lanka; 107 (41 overs) |
| Laura Newton 60 (80); Suwini de Alwis 3/38 (10 overs) | | Suwini de Alwis 29 (65); Rosalie Birch 4/22 (7 overs) |

England Women won by 99 runs
R. Premadasa Stadium, Colombo
Umpires: JG Pushparajah (SL) and P Athukorale (SL)

- Sri Lanka Women won the toss and elected to field.
- Dumila Dedunu and WA Chandrawathi (SL) both made their WODI debuts.

== Tour of India ==
English women's cricket team in India in 2005–06
| | India | England |
- Dates: 17 November – 9 December 2005
| Captains | Mithali Raj | Charlotte Edwards |

Test series
- Result: 1-match series drawn 0–0
| Most runs | Mithali Raj (130) | Arran Brindle (83) |
| Most wickets | Jhulan Goswami (6) | Laura Harper (6) |

One Day International series
- Results: India won the 5-match series 4–1
| Most runs | Karu Jain (180) | Charlotte Edwards (164) |
| Most wickets | Jhulan Goswami (10) | Laura Harper (4) |
- Player of the series: Jhulan Goswami (Ind)

=== Squads ===
| India | England |
|---|---|
| Mithali Raj (c); Nooshin Al Khadeer; Anjum Chopra; Neetu David; Rumeli Dhar; Jhulan Goswami; Karu Jain (wk); Arundhati Kirkire (wk); Reema Malhotra; Sravanthi Naidu; Varsha Raffel; Asha Rawat; Amita Sharma; Jaya Sharma; Monica Sumra | Charlotte Edwards (c); Caroline Atkins; Rosalie Birch; Arran Brindle; Katherine Brunt; Lydia Greenway; Isa Guha; Jenny Gunn; Laura Harper; Beth Morgan; Laura Newton; Nicky Shaw; Jane Smit (wk); Claire Taylor; Jo Watts |

=== Tour Matches ===
==== 50-over match: India Under-21s v England ====
17 November 2005
Scorecard

| India Under-21s; 147/7 (50 overs) | v | England; 149/0 (22.2 overs) |
| Diana David 40* (62); Laura Harper 3/16 (10 overs) | | Charlotte Edwards 91* (71) |

England Women won by 10 wickets
Kailash Prakash Stadium, Meerut
Umpires: Kamlesh Sharma (Ind) and Manoj Pundir (Ind)
Player of the match: Charlotte Edwards (Eng)

- India Under-21s Women won the toss and elected to bat.

==== 50-over match: India Under-21s v England ====
18 November 2005
Scorecard

| England; 182/8 (50 overs) | v | India Under-21s; 145 (49.4 overs) |
| Rosalie Birch 30 (69); Diana David 2/33 (9 overs) | | Karu Jain 48 (91); Rosalie Birch 6/24 (9.4 overs) |

England Women won by 37 runs
Kailash Prakash Stadium, Meerut
Umpires: Kamlesh Sharma (Ind) and Manoj Pundir (Ind)

- England Women won the toss and elected to bat.

=== Only Test ===
21 – 24 November 2005
Scorecard

| India | v | England |
| 289 (126.5 overs); Mithali Raj 78 (160); Laura Harper 5/66 (40 overs) | | 154 (97.4 overs); Arran Brindle 37 (139); Jhulan Goswami 5/25 (20 overs) |
| 175/4d (61 overs); Karu Jain 35 (83); Rosalie Birch 2/14 (6 overs) | | 210/6 (113 overs); Charlotte Edwards 46 (94); Nooshin Al Khadeer 3/30 (32 overs) |

Match drawn
Jamia Millia Cricket Ground, Delhi
Umpires: Des Raj (Ind) and Rameshwar Singh (Ind)

- India Women won the toss and elected to bat.
- Rumeli Dhar, Karu Jain, Sravanthi Naidu, Asha Rawat and Monica Sumra (Ind) all made their WTest debuts.

=== WODI Series ===
==== 1st ODI ====
27 November 2005
Scorecard

| England; 188/7 (50 overs) | v | India; 168/9 (50 overs) |
| Charlotte Edwards 68 (122); Neetu David 4/48 (10 overs) | | Monica Sumra 59 (114); Laura Harper 4/33 (8 overs) |

England Women won by 20 runs
Nahar Singh Stadium, Faridabad
Umpires: Devinder Sharma (Ind) and Dharmesh Bhardwaj (Ind)
Player of the match: Charlotte Edwards (Eng)

- India Women won the toss and elected to field.

==== 2nd ODI ====
1 December 2005
Scorecard

| England; 162/8 (50 overs) | v | India; 163/6 (49.2 overs) |
| Caroline Atkins 34 (61); Amita Sharma 3/27 (9 overs) | | Anjum Chopra 71 (132); Beth Morgan 2/27 (7.2 overs) |

India Women won by 4 wickets
K. D. Singh Babu Stadium, Lucknow
Umpires: Arun Bharadwaj (Ind) and Satish Gupta (Ind)
Player of the match: Anjum Chopra (Ind)

- India Women won the toss and elected to field.

==== 3rd ODI ====
4 December 2005
Scorecard

| England; 215/7 (50 overs) | v | India; 216/2 (40.4 overs) |
| Charlotte Edwards 66 (112); Nooshin Al Khadeer 3/46 (10 overs) | | Mithali Raj 65* (81); Arran Brindle 1/18 (3 overs) |

India Women won by 8 wickets
Nehru Stadium, Guwahati
Umpires: Devinder Sharma (Ind) and Dharmesh Bhardwaj (Ind)
Player of the match: Karu Jain (Ind)

- England Women won the toss and elected to bat.

==== 4th ODI ====
4 December 2005
Scorecard

| England; 50 (30.4 overs) | v | India; 51/0 (14.5 overs) |
| Jenny Gunn 13 (53); Jhulan Goswami 5/16 (10 overs) | | Jaya Sharma 29* (49) |

India Women won by 10 wickets
SM Dev Stadium, Silchar
Umpires: Devinder Sharma (Ind) and Dharmesh Bhardwaj (Ind)
Player of the match: Jhulan Goswami (Ind)

- India Women won the toss and elected to field.

==== 5th ODI ====
9 December 2005
Scorecard

| India; 243/4 (50 overs) | v | England; 205 (46.5 overs) |
| Karu Jain 103 (147); Arran Brindle 1/49 (9 overs) | | Arran Brindle 52 (66); Amita Sharma 2/31 (8.5 overs) |

India Women won by 38 runs
Eden Gardens, Kolkata
Umpires: A Das (Ind) and Premdip Chatterjee (Ind)
Player of the match: Karu Jain (Ind)

- England Women won the toss and elected to field.
- Sravanthi Naidu (Ind) made her WODI debut.
