= 2004 Women's Asia Cup =

Cricket tournament in Sri Lanka

Women's One Day International Asia Cup
- Dates: 17 – 29 April 2004
- Administrator: Asian Cricket Council
- Cricket format: One Day International
- Host: Sri Lanka
- Champions: India (1st title)
- Runners-up: Sri Lanka
- Participants: 2
- Matches: 5
- Player of the series: (India) Anjum Chopra
- Most runs: (India) Anju Jain (231)
- Most wickets: (India) Mamatha Maben (10)

The 2004 Women's One-Day Internationals Asia Cup was the inaugural edition of the Asian Cricket Council Women's One Day International cricket tournament. The two teams which took part were India and Sri Lanka in a tournament held in Sri Lanka, from 17 to 29 April 2004. The matches were played at the Sinhalese Sports Club Ground and Kandy Cricket Club. India won the inaugural edition against Sri Lanka 5–0.

== Squads ==
Squads
India	Sri Lanka
Mamatha Maben (c)	Thanuga Ekanayake (c) & (wk)
Anju Jain (wk)	Inoka Galagedara
Jaya Sharma	Randika Galhenage
Anjum Chopra	Indika Kankanange
Mithali Raj	Chamani Seneviratne
Arundhati Kirkire	Hiruka Fernando
Jhulan Goswami	Shashikala Siriwardene
Neetu David	Rose Fernando
Deepa Marathe	Thalika Gunaratne
Nooshin Al Khadeer	Dona Indralatha
Amita Sharma	Gayathri Kariyawasam
Hemlata Kala	Dedunu Silva
Sunetra Paranjpe	Janakanthy Mala
Karu Jain	Sandamali Dolawatte
Diana David	Kodupulle Indrani
–	Chamari Polgampola

== Match summary ==
17 April
Scorecard

India; 217/4 (45 overs)	v	Sri Lanka; 94/9 (45 overs)
Anju Jain 90 (115); Hiruka Fernando 2/16 (9 overs)		Hiruka Fernando 31* (80); Deepa Marathe 2/13 (8 overs)

India won by 123 runs
Sinhalese Sports Club Ground, Colombo
Umpires: KK Jayaweera and T Junkeer

- Sri Lanka won the toss and elected to field.

19 April
Scorecard

India; 189/5 (50 overs)	v	Sri Lanka; 84 (44.3 overs)
Mithali Raj 48* (61); Hiruka Fernando 2/47 (9 overs)		Chamani Seneviratne 16 (67); Arundhati Kirkire 3/13 (4 overs)

India won by 105 runs
Sinhalese Sports Club Ground, Colombo
Umpires: SSK Gallage and S Gunaratne

- India won the toss and elected to bat.

21 April
Scorecard

Sri Lanka; 89 (39.3 overs)	v	India; 90/4 (24.4 overs)
Hiruka Fernando 24 (64); Nooshin Al Khadeer 4/15 (8.3 overs)		Anjum Chopra 22* (55); Janakanthy Mala 2/19 (7 overs)

India won by 6 wickets
Sinhalese Sports Club Ground, Colombo
Umpires: RSSK Perera and WCC Rodrigo

- Sri Lanka won the toss and elected to bat.
- Kodupulle Indrani (Sri Lanka) made her ODI debut.

25 April
Scorecard

Sri Lanka; 66 (28.2 overs)	v	India; 69/0 (17.2 overs)
Shashikala Siriwardene 28 (53); Mamatha Maben 6/10 (6.2 overs)		Anju Jain 36* (57); Janakanthy Mala 0/10 (6.2 overs)

India won by 10 wickets
Kandy Cricket Club
Umpires: W Gunawansa and BPJ Mendis

- Sri Lanka won the toss and elected to bat.
- Chamari Polgampola (Sri Lanka) made her ODI debut.

29 April
Scorecard

India; 178/5 (50 overs)	v	Sri Lanka; 84 (45.2 overs)
Anju Jain 64 (86); Shashikala Siriwardene 2/34 (10 overs)		Hiruka Fernando 26(66); Deepa Marathe 3/3 (10 overs)

India won by 94 runs
Sinhalese Sports Club Ground, Colombo
Umpires: MWDP de Silva and MSK Nandiweera
Player of the match: Anju Jain (Ind)

- Sri Lanka won the toss and elected to field.
