= List of Sri Lanka women ODI cricketers =

This is a list of Sri Lankan women's One-day international cricketers. Overall, 77 Sri Lankan women have played in at least one women's one-day international for their country. A One Day International, or an ODI, is an international cricket match between two representative teams, each having ODI status. An ODI differs from test matches in that the number of overs per team is limited, and that each team has only one innings. The list is arranged in the order in which each player won her first ODI cap. Where more than one player won her first ODI cap in the same match, their names are listed alphabetically by surname.

== Key ==
General

- † – Wicket-keeper
- First – Year of debut
- Last – Year of latest game
- Mat – Number of matches played

Batting

- Runs – Runs scored in career
- HS – Highest score
- Avg – Runs scored per dismissal
- * – Batsman remained not out
- 50 – Number of half centuries
- 100 – Centuries scored

Bowling

- Balls – Balls bowled in career
- Wkt – Wickets taken in career
- BBI – Best bowling in an innings
- Ave – Average runs per wicket

Fielding

- Ca – Catches taken
- St – Stumpings taken

== Players ==
Statistics are correct as on 25 April 2026.

General					Batting					Bowling				Fielding	
Cap	Name	First	Last	Mat	Runs	HS	Avg	100	50	Balls	Wkt	BBI	Ave	Ca	St
1	Vanessa Bowen	1997	1999	13	291	51*	32.33	0	2	60	0	—	—	3	0
2	Thanuga Ekanayake†	1997	2005	43	83	13	5.53	0	0	—	—	—	—	22	17
3	Hiruka Fernando	1997	2010	60	1015	78*	21.14	0	3	444	12	3/14	23.75	9	0
4	Thalika Gunaratne	1997	2005	13	29	6*	4.83	0	0	400	10	4/6	23.70	1	0
5	Dona Indralatha	1997	2006	23	124	32	6.88	0	0	687	12	2/10	34.08	5	0
6	Gayathri Kariyawasam	1997	2004	17	6	3	2.00	0	0	534	12	3/26	24.00	5	0
7	Ramani Perera	1997	2002	19	83	13*	8.30	0	0	506	23	4/18	12.26	10	0
8	Vasanthi Ratnayake	1997	2003	22	558	88	26.57	0	3	90	0	—	—	4	0
9	Chamani Seneviratna	1997	2013	80	832	56	14.85	0	1	3291	72	4/23	26.11	27	0
10	Rasanjali Silva	1997	2000	22	256	53	14.22	0	1	1093	23	4/16	23.08	6	0
11	Suthershini Sivanantham	1997	2003	27	86	36	8.60	0	0	1135	35	5/2	14.54	14	0
12	Kalpana Liyanarachchi	1997	2000	16	63	19	4.84	0	0	36	0	—	—	1	0
13	Ganga De Silva	1997	1997	2	12	6	6.00	0	0	—	—	—	—	0	0
14	Rose Fernando	1997	2009	37	176	27*	10.35	0	0	1631	43	4/3	14.41	10	0
15	Chandrika Lakmalee	1998	2000	10	28	21	5.60	0	0	234	3	2/19	56.66	0	0
16	Chaturi Thalagalage	1998	1999	6	126	68	31.50	0	1	—	—	—	—	2	0
17	Dedunu Gunaratne	1998	1998	2	72	57*	72.00	0	1	—	—	—	—	0	0
18	Champa Sugathadasa	1999	2000	8	68	22	9.71	0	0	60	0	—	—	0	0
19	Hiroshi Abeysinghe	2000	2006	31	499	71*	22.68	0	4	342	8	2/17	28.50	11	0
20	Janakanthy Mala	2000	2008	27	91	11	3.95	0	0	1038	15	4/3	40.66	2	0
21	Dedunu Silva	2000	2010	42	884	78	21.04	0	6	—	—	—	—	8	0
22	Indika Kankanange	2000	2004	17	205	58	14.64	0	1	490	9	3/14	27.55	4	0
23	Sandamali Dolawatte	2002	2013	53	431	74	12.31	0	1	870	25	5/16	23.36	13	0
24	Lalana Priyadarshani	2002	2002	1	—	—	—	—	—	42	0	—	—	0	0
25	Randika Galhenage	2002	2006	15	117	34	9.00	0	0	—	—	—	—	2	0
26	Inoka Galagedara	2002	2012	40	239	50	7.02	0	1	39	2	1/2	15.00	13	0
27	Shashikala Siriwardene	2003	2019	118	2029	68	18.44	0	7	5449	124	4/11	28.84	41	0
28	Kodupulle Indrani	2004	2004	1	2	2	2.00	0	0	6	0	—	—	0	0
29	Chamari Polgampola	2004	2018	75	1083	68*	15.47	0	3	1758	34	4/26	33.11	18	0
30	Suwini de Alwis	2005	2011	49	604	73	14.38	0	1	2103	58	4/21	21.65	14	0
31	Eshani Lokusuriyage	2005	2017	89	1219	65*	15.62	0	5	2095	49	3/23	30.42	13	0
32	Praba Udawatte	2005	2006	13	104	30	8.66	0	0	510	10	3/38	27.20	4	0
33	Sumudu Fernando	2005	2006	3	5	5	2.50	0	0	42	0	—	—	0	0
34	WA Chandrawathi	2005	2006	5	32	10	8.00	0	0	81	2	1/19	31.00	0	0
35	Dumila Dedunu†	2005	2006	4	9	6*	—	0	0	—	—	—	—	4	3
36	Dilani Manodara†	2006	2019	97	1363	84	18.93	0	3	24	0	—	—	47	24
37	Sripali Weerakkody	2006	2018	89	722	29*	12.66	0	0	3046	58	3/19	35.62	13	0
38	Sanduni Abeywickrema	2006	2015	10	64	18	8.00	0	0	60	1	1/23	29.00	1	0
39	Nirosha Kumari	2006	2006	2	3	2	1.50	0	0	66	0	—	—	1	0
40	Deepika Rasangika	2008	2014	31	473	84	18.19	0	2	102	4	4/38	20.50	9	0
41	Chamika Bandara	2008	2008	1	3	3	3.00	0	0	—	—	—	—	0	0
42	Chandi Wickramasinghe	2008	2010	8	50	27	16.66	0	0	188	5	2/23	22.20	3	0
43	Udeshika Prabodhani	2009	2025	73	238	21	6.80	0	0	2679	41	3/35	46.87	8	0
44	Chamari Athapaththu	2010	2026	129	4253	195*	34.57	9	21	2627	61	4/42	37.44	32	0
45	Lasanthi Madushani	2010	2016	13	121	23	10.08	0	0	12	0	—	—	0	0
46	Dharshani Dharmasiri	2010	2012	3	6	4	3.00	0	0	108	2	1/15	35.50	0	0
47	Sharina Ravikumar	2010	2013	11	18	8	6.00	0	0	381	14	4/14	18.21	2	0
48	Yashoda Mendis	2011	2017	33	635	56	19.24	0	3	—	—	—	—	6	0
49	Maduri Samuddika	2011	2015	23	130	21*	10.83	0	0	906	17	2/10	33.05	7	0
50	Prasadani Weerakkody†	2011	2024	57	987	69	17.62	0	2	—	—	—	—	39	16
51	Oshadi Ranasinghe	2011	2024	41	367	51*	13.10	0	1	1469	40	5/34	31.75	7	0
52	Inoka Ranaweera	2012	2026	95	221	32*	7.89	0	0	4300	101	4/39	31.90	17	0
53	Chandima Gunaratne	2012	2017	15	44	13*	8.80	0	0	672	10	4/41	43.80	2	0
54	Nipuni Hansika	2013	2018	34	544	50*	16.48	0	1	—	—	—	—	5	0
55	Nobet Ida	2013	2013	1	0	0	0.00	0	0	18	0	—	—	0	0
56	Niluka Karunaratne	2013	2013	2	17	13	8.50	0	0	—	—	—	—	0	0
57	Rebeca Vandort†	2013	2018	7	73	34	10.42	0	0	—	—	—	—	1	2
58	Anushka Sanjeewani†	2014	2026	54	586	55	14.65	0	1	—	—	—	—	29	11
59	Ama Kanchana	2014	2024	34	345	47*	12.77	0	0	975	26	3/26	34.11	15	0
60	Hasini Perera	2014	2026	69	1350	95	22.13	0	4	—	—	—	—	16	0
61	Sugandika Kumari	2015	2026	51	229	27	9.54	0	0	2062	45	4/39	38.53	12	0
62	Chathurani Gunawardene	2015	2015	2	12	9*	12.00	0	0	90	3	2/25	33.66	0	0
63	Nilakshi de Silva	2015	2026	63	1224	63	29.14	0	4	396	4	1/27	92.75	24	0
64	Achini Kulasuriya	2015	2025	31	99	17	5.21	0	0	1122	21	3/35	43.95	9	0
65	Hansima Karunaratne	2016	2025	23	309	54	15.45	0	1	162	1	1/40	152.00	5	0
66	Inoshi Priyadharshani	2016	2025	15	28	12*	4.66	0	0	564	16	3/21	23.06	5	0
67	Imalka Mendis	2016	2018	3	17	12	5.66	0	0	—	—	—	—	1	0
68	Harshitha Samarawickrama	2016	2026	54	1620	105	35.21	2	9	24	0	—	—	22	0
69	Malsha Shehani	2017	2017	1	11	11	11.00	0	0	30	0	—	—	0	0
70	Kavisha Dilhari	2018	2026	50	900	84	27.27	0	3	1759	43	4/20	33.79	14	0
71	Umesha Thimashini	2019	2019	1	2	2	2.00	0	0	—	—	—	—	1	0
72	Tharika Sewwandi	2019	2019	1	1	1	1.00	0	0	12	0	—	—	0	0
73	Sachini Nisansala	2022	2025	7	20	17*	6.66	0	0	299	9	5/28	26.33	1	0
74	Rashmi Silva	2022	2022	2	25	18	12.50	0	0	72	2	2/53	41.50	0	0
75	Vishmi Gunaratne	2022	2026	37	927	132	27.26	2	3	—	—	—	—	9	0
76	Imesha Dulani	2023	2026	7	142	56	23.66	0	2	—	—	—	—	2	0
77	Kawya Kavindi	2023	2024	5	17	15	8.50	0	0	94	1	1/28	107.00	0	0
78	Manudi Nanayakkara	2025	2025	3	14	13	4.66	0	0	24	1	1/40	40.00	2	0
79	Chethana Vimukthi	2025	2026	6	7	4*	7.00	0	0	180	4	3/36	42.75	0	0
80	Malki Madara	2025	2026	15	15	9	3.00	0	0	557	14	4/50	34.57	4	0
81	Piumi Wathsala	2025	2025	4	18	9	6.00	0	0	35	0	—	—	1	0
82	Dewmi Vihanga	2025	2026	12	63	16	7.87	0	0	600	17	5/43	27.47	4	0
83	Nimasha Meepage	2026	2026	4	0	0*	–	0	0	198	5	2/29	23.40	1	0
84	Kaushini Nuthyangana†	2026	2026	6	29	18	7.25	0	0	—	—	—	—	6	3
85	Rashmika Sewwandi	2026	2026	2	—	—	—	—	—	60	0	—	—	2	0
