= Gunaratne =

Gunaratne ගුණරත්න
- Pronunciation: Guṇaratna
- Language: Sinhala

Origin
- Region of origin: Sri Lanka

Other names
- Alternative spelling: Goonaratne; Gunaratna

Gunaratne or Goonaratne (Sinhala: ගුණරත්න, romanized: Guṇaratna) is both a given name and a surname. Notable people with the name include:

== Given name ==
- Gunaratna Weerakoon, Sri Lankan politician

== Surname ==
- Anil Goonaratne, Sri Lankan judge and lawyer
- Asela Gunaratne (born 1986), Sri Lankan cricketer
- C. V. Gunaratne, Sri Lankan Minister of Industries Development
- Chandima Gunaratne (born 1982), Sri Lankan cricketer
- Chathura Gunaratne (born 1982), Sri Lankan association football midfielder
- D. Shelton A. Gunaratne, Sri Lankan American professor of mass communications
- Dedunu Gunaratne, Sri Lankan cricketer
- Dilesh Gunaratne, Sri Lankan cricketer
- K. D. Goonaratne, Sri Lankan schoolteacher and politician
- Kamal Gunaratne, Sri Lankan military general
- M. H. Gunaratne, Sri Lankan military officer
- Nimal Gunaratne, Director of Health Services of the Sri Lanka Air Force
- Pulasthi Gunaratne (born 1973), Sri Lankan cricketer
- R. D. Gunaratne, Sri Lankan chess player and scientist
- Rohan Gunaratna (born 1961), Singaporean analyst on security affairs
- Sarath Kumara Gunaratna, Sri Lankan politician
- Thalika Gunaratne (born 1975), Sri Lankan cricketer
- Tilak Goonaratne, Sri Lankan civil servant and diplomat
- Tudor Gunaratne (born 1966), Sri Lankan cricketer
- Yasmine Gooneratne, Sri Lankan writer
