= Gooneratne =

Gooneratne (Sinhala: ගුණරත්න, romanized: Guṇaratna) is a Sinhalese surname. Notable people with the surname include:

- Anil Goonaratne, Sri Lankan puisne justice of the Supreme Court
- Brendon Gooneratne (1938–2021), Sri Lankan scholar and physician
- Chandra Dharma Sena Gooneratne (1899–1981), Sri Lankan social activist, historian, poet, diplomat and military officer
- Edmund Rowland Gooneratne (1845–1914), Ceylonese British colonial-era administrator and scholar
- L. V. Gooneratne (1894–1971), Sri Lankan politician
- Nelson Gooneratne (born 1934), Sri Lankan cricket umpire
- Shiran Gooneratne, Sri Lankan puisne justice of the Supreme Court
- Yasmine Gooneratne (1935–2024), Sri Lankan poet, short story writer, university professor and essayist

== See also ==
- Gunaratne
