= List of Pakistan women Test cricketers =

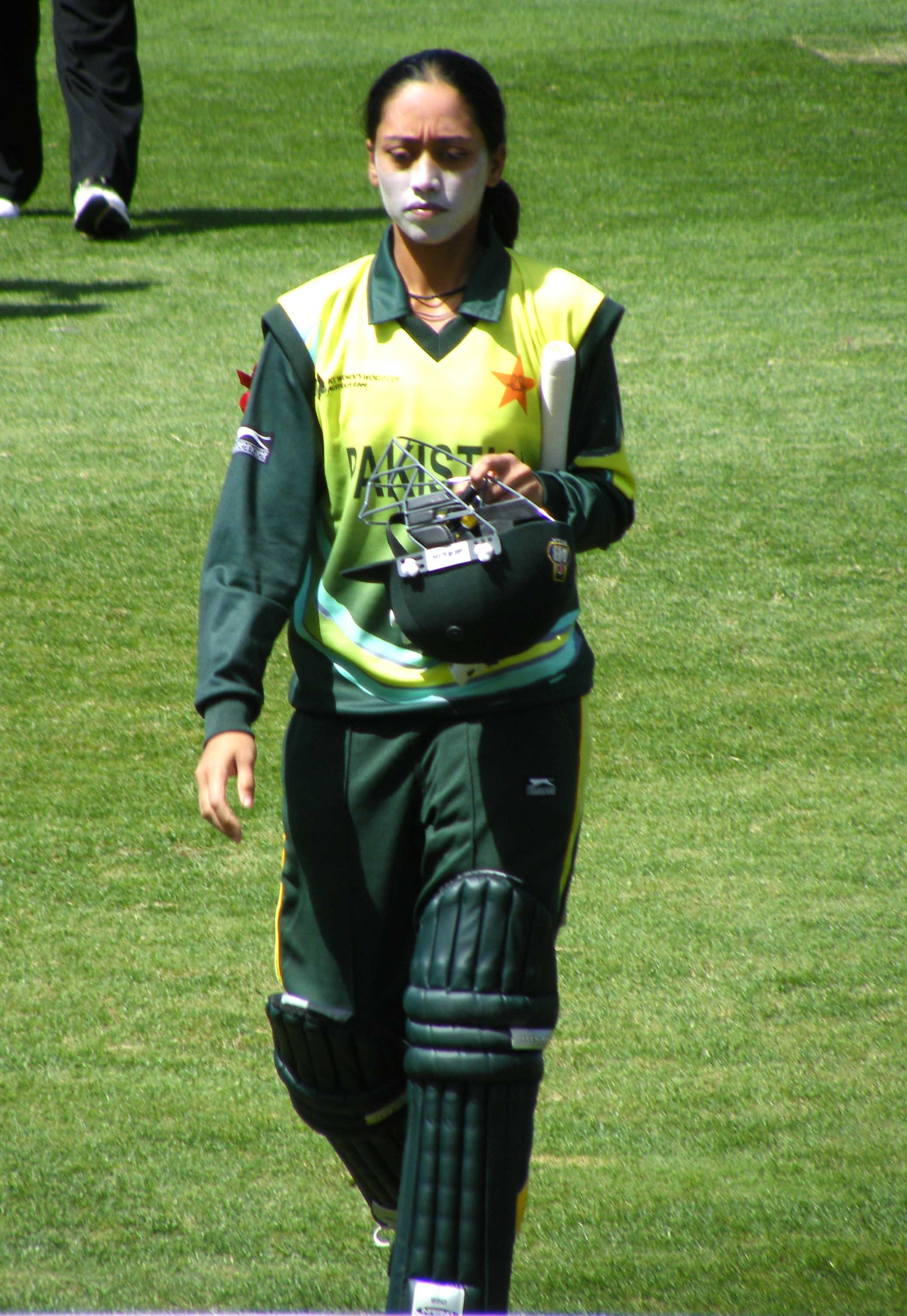
Batool Fatima has taken the most Test cricket dismissals for Pakistan.

A women's Test match is an international four-innings cricket match held over a maximum of four days between two of the ten leading cricketing nations. The first women's Test was played between England and Australia in 1934. As of 2014, the Pakistan women's team have played three Test matches since their first appearance in 1998, against Sri Lanka at the Colts Cricket Club. Pakistan have lost two matches, while one resulted in a draw. Twenty women have played Test matches for Pakistan.

As of 2014, four players have made the most appearances for Pakistan in Women's Test cricket, playing in all the three matches. Five players have appeared in two matches each, and eleven have played in one match each. Shaiza Khan has captained the side in all the three matches. Kiran Baluch has scored the most runs in total, making 360 from 6 innings. Her score of 242, made against West Indies in March 2004, is the highest total by any batsman in Women's Test cricket as of 2014. Khan has taken more wickets than any other Pakistani bowler in this format of the game, dismissing 19 batsmen over 3 matches. She has the best bowling figures in an innings among Pakistani bowlers, 7 wickets for 59 runs. Her 13 wickets for 226 runs in a match is the best performance by any bowler in the format. Khan, Urooj Mumtaz, and Batool Fatima have taken the most catches with three each. Fatima holds the record for the most Test cricket dismissals for Pakistan with five.

The first list comprises all members of the Pakistan Women's cricket team who have played at least one Test match. It is initially arranged in the order in which each player won her first Test cap. Where more than one player won her first Test cap in the same match, those players are listed alphabetically by surname. The second lists those who have represented Pakistan as captain.

== Key ==
General

- ‡ – Captain
- † – Wicket-keeper
- First – Year of debut
- Last – Year of latest game
- Mat – Number of matches played
- Win% – Winning percentage

Batting

- Inn – Number of innings batted
- NO – Number of innings not out
- Runs – Runs scored in career
- HS – Highest score
- 100 – Centuries scored
- 50 – Half-centuries scored
- Avg – Average runs scored per dismissal
- * – Batsman remained not out

Bowling

- Balls – Balls bowled in career
- Wkt – Wickets taken in career
- BBI – Best bowling in an innings
- BBM – Best bowling in a match
- Ave – Average runs per wicket

Fielding

- Ca – Catches taken
- St – Stumpings effected

== Test cricketers ==
Statistics are correct as of the Pakistan women's most recent Test match, against West Indies on 15 March 2004.

No.	Name	First	Last	Mat	Batting							Bowling					Fielding		Ref
No.	Name	First	Last	Mat	Inn	NO	Runs	HS	100	50	Avg	Balls	Wkt	BBI	BBM	Ave	Ca	St	Ref
1	Kiran Baluch	1998	2004	3	6	0	360	242	1	1	60.00	300	2	2/41	2/56	76.50	1	0	
2	Sadia Butt	1998	2004	3	6	2	34	10	0	0	8.50	156	0	—	—	—	2	0	
3	Asma Farzand †	1998	1998	1	2	0	35	20	0	0	17.50	—	—	—	—	—	0	2	
4	Shazia Hassan	1998	1998	1	2	0	7	6	0	0	3.50	12	0	—	—	—	0	0	
5	Mahewish Khan	1998	2000	2	4	0	28	17	0	0	7.00	168	1	1/65	1/65	75.00	0	0	
6	Muqudos Khan	1998	1998	1	2	2	11	11*	0	0	—	—	—	—	—	—	0	0	
7	Shaiza Khan ‡	1998	2004	3	5	0	69	35	0	0	13.80	864	19	7/59	13/226	24.05	3	0	
8	Sharmeen Khan	1998	2000	2	4	0	29	19	0	0	7.25	211	5	3/23	4/99	25.80	1	0	
9	Nazia Nazir	1998	2004	3	6	0	8	5	0	0	1.33	270	7	4/66	4/66	22.85	2	0	
10	Nazia Sadiq	1998	1998	1	2	0	13	13	0	0	6.50	—	—	—	—	—	2	0	
11	Deebah Sherazi	1998	2000	2	4	0	18	12	0	0	4.50	72	1	1/35	1/35	35.00	1	0	
12	Zehmarad Afzal	2000	2000	1	2	0	45	25	0	0	25.28	—	—	—	—	—	0	0	
13	Uzma Gondal †	2000	2000	1	2	2	0	0*	0	0	0.00	—	—	—	—	—	0	1	
14	Khursheed Jabeen	2000	2004	2	4	1	46	20*	0	0	15.33	72	1	1/35	1/35	35.00	1	0	
15	Sajjida Shah	2000	2004	2	3	0	100	98	0	1	33.33	6	0	—	—	—	0	0	
16	Mariam Butt	2004	2004	1	—	—	—	—	—	—	—	—	—	—	—	—	0	0	
17	Maryam Butt	2004	2004	1	1	1	27	27*	0	0	—	72	1	1/19	1/19	19.00	1	0	
18	Batool Fatima †	2004	2004	1	1	0	0	0	0	0	0.00	—	—	—	—	—	3	2	
19	Shabana Latif	2004	2004	1	—	—	—	—	—	—	—	—	—	—	—	—	0	0	
20	Urooj Mumtaz	2004	2004	1	1	0	0	0	0	0	0.00	198	2	1/24	2/97	48.50	1	0	

== Test captains ==
No.	Name	First	Last	Mat	Won	Lost	Tied	Draw	Win%
1	Shaiza Khan	1998	2004	3	0	2	0	1	0
