= Mohamed Azary =

Sri Lankan cricketer (born 1972)

Mohamed Azary (born 19 November 1972, in Kandy) was a Sri Lankan cricketer. He was a right-handed batsman and right-arm off-break bowler who played for Kandy.

== Career ==
Azary made a single first-class appearance for the side, during the 2001–02 season, against Ragama. From the tailend, he scored 0 in the first innings in which he batted, and 0 not out in the second. He bowled 12 overs during the match, taking 1 wicket.
