= Munidasa =

Munidasa is a surname. Notable people with the surname include:

- Dharshan Munidasa (born 1970), Sri Lankan chef-restaurateur
- Kumaratunga Munidasa (1887–1944), Sri Lankan linguist
- Pradeep Munidasa (born 1978), Sri Lankan cricketer
