= Shabana Latif =

Pakistani cricketer (born 1981)

Personal information
- Born: 15 May 1981 (age 45); Attock, Punjab, Pakistan
- Batting: Right-handed

International information
- National side: Pakistan (2003–2004)
- Only Test (cap 19): 15 March 2004 v West Indies
- ODI debut (cap 33): 25 July 2003 v West Indies
- Last ODI: 29 March 2004 v West Indies
- Source: CricketArchive, 19 March 2024

Shabana Latif (born 15 May 1981) is a former Pakistani cricketer who played as a right-handed batter. She appeared in one Test match and 4 One Day Internationals for Pakistan in 2003 and 2004.

She made her One Day International (WODI) debut in 2003 IWCC Trophy, against West Indies on 25 July 2003. She made her Test debut against West Indies on 15 March 2004.
