= Muqudos Khan =

Pakistani cricketer (born 1981)

Personal information
- Full name: Shazia Muqudos Khan
- Born: 4 January 1981 (age 45); Gujranwala, Pakistan
- Role: Batter

International information
- National side: Pakistan (1998)
- Only Test (cap 6): 17 April 1998 v Sri Lanka
- ODI debut (cap 22): 11 April 1998 v Sri Lanka
- Last ODI: 15 April 1998 v Sri Lanka

Career statistics
Competition	WTest	WODI
Matches	1	3
Runs scored	11	1
Batting average	–	1.00
100s/50s	0/0	0/0
Top score	11*	1
Catches/stumpings	0/–	0/–
- Source: CricketArchive, 14 December 2021

Shazia Muqudos Khan (born 4 January 1981) is a Pakistani former cricketer who played as a batter. She appeared in one Test match and three One Day Internationals for Pakistan in 1998, all on the side's tour of Sri Lanka.
