= Priyadarshani =

Priyadarshani is a surname. Notable people with the surname include:

- Charitha Priyadarshani (born 1967), Sri Lankan singer
- Deepika Priyadarshani (fl. 1986), Sri Lankan singer
- Lalana Priyadarshani (born 1980), Sri Lankan cricketer
