= Rezvi =

Rezvi is both a given name and a surname. Notable people with the name include:

- Rezvi Sheriff (1948/49–2026), Sri Lankan nephrologist
- Sabeen Rezvi (born 1984), Pakistani former cricketer
