= List of Sri Lanka women Test cricketers =

This is a list of Sri Lankan women Test cricketers. A Test match is an international cricket match between two of the leading cricketing nations. The list is arranged in the order in which each player won her Test cap. Where more than one player won her first Test cap in the same Test match, the surname the player was using at the time of the match is listed alphabetically. To date, Sri Lanka have played just a single Women's Test match, against Pakistan in 1998.

== Key ==
General

- ‡ – Captain
- † – Wicket-keeper
- First – Year of debut
- Last – Year of latest game
- Mat – Number of matches played
- Win% – Winning percentage

Batting

- Runs – Runs scored in career
- HS – Highest score
- Avg – Runs scored per dismissal
- * – Batsman remained not out

Bowling

- Balls – Balls bowled in career
- Wkt – Wickets taken in career
- BBI – Best bowling in an innings
- Ave – Average runs per wicket

Fielding

- Ca – Catches taken
- St – Stumpings taken

== List of players ==
Statistics are correct as of Sri Lanka women's only Test match, against Pakistan on 17 April 1998.

General					Batting			Bowling				Fielding		Ref
Cap	Name	First	Last	Mat	Runs	HS	Avg	Balls	Wkt	BBI	Ave	Ca	St	Ref
1	Vanessa Bowen	1998	1998	1	141	78	70.50	12	0	–	–	1	0	
2	Thanuga Ekanayake	1998	1998	1	0	0	–	0	–	–	–	2	0	
3	Rose Fernando	1998	1998	1	52	44	52.00	174	4	3/28	17.25	11	0	
4	Dedunu Gunaratne	1998	1998	1	55	29	27.50	0	–	–	–	0	0	
5	Chandrika Lakmalee	1998	1998	1	27	14*	27.00	66	0	–	–	1	0	
6	Kalpana Liyanarachchi †	1998	1998	1	20	20	20.00	66	0	–	–	2	0	
7	Ramani Perera	1998	1998	1	27	23	13.50	0	–	–	–	0	0	
8	Vasanthi Ratnayake	1998	1998	1	18	13	9.00	0	–	–	–	0	0	
9	Chamani Seneviratne	1998	1998	1	148	105*	148.00	209	7	5/31	8.42	0	0	
10	Rasanjali Silva ‡	1998	1998	1	26	26	13.00	264	8	4/27	7.12	2	0	
11	Chaturi Thalagalage	1998	1998	1	16	11	8.00	0	–	–	–	0	0	
