= Mahewish Khan =

Pakistani cricketer (born 1981)

Personal information
- Full name: Mahewish Shahid Khan
- Born: 12 August 1981 (age 45); Karachi, Pakistan
- Batting: Right-handed
- Bowling: Right-arm medium
- Role: All-rounder

International information
- National sides: Pakistan (1998–2001); Canada (2019)
- Test debut (cap 5): 17 April 1998; Pakistan v Sri Lanka
- Last Test: 30 July 2000; Pakistan v Ireland
- ODI debut (cap 21): 11 April 1998; Pakistan v Sri Lanka
- Last ODI: 21 April 2001; Pakistan v Netherlands
- T20I debut (cap 6): 17 May 2019; Canada v United States
- Last T20I: 19 May 2019; Canada v United States

Career statistics
Competition	WTest	WODI	WT20I	WT20
Matches	2	14	3	4
Runs scored	28	136	17	17
Batting average	7.00	10.46	5.66	4.25
100s/50s	0/0	0/1	0/0	0/0
Top score	17	69	8	8
Balls bowled	168	294	54	66
Wickets	1	4	3	3
Bowling average	75.00	48.00	15.33	18.33
5 wickets in innings	0	0	0	0
10 wickets in match	0	0	0	0
Best bowling	1/65	1/10	2/11	2/11
Catches/stumpings	0/–	1/–	0/–	1/–
- Source: CricketArchive, 14 December 2021

Mahewish Shahid Khan (Urdu: مہوش شاہد خان) (born 12 August 1981) is a Pakistani-Canadian former cricketer who played as a right-arm medium-fast bowler and right-handed batter. She appeared in two Test matches and 14 One Day Internationals for Pakistan between 1998 and 2001 before moving to play for Canada, appearing in 3 Twenty20 Internationals for the side in 2019.

In May 2019, she was named as the captain of Canada's squad for the 2019 ICC Women's Qualifier Americas tournament against the United States. She made her WT20I debut against the United States in the Americas Qualifier on 17 May 2019.
