= Asma Farzand =

Pakistani cricketer (born 1981)

Personal information
- Full name: Asma Qureshi Farzand
- Born: 1 January 1981 (age 45); Lahore, Pakistan
- Batting: Right-handed
- Role: Wicket-keeper

International information
- National side: Pakistan (1997–1998)
- Only Test (cap 3): 17 April 1998 v Sri Lanka
- ODI debut (cap 13): 10 December 1997 v Denmark
- Last ODI: 15 April 1998 v Sri Lanka

Career statistics
| Competition | WTest | WODI |
|---|---|---|
| Matches | 1 | 8 |
| Runs scored | 35 | 134 |
| Batting average | 17.50 | 19.14 |
| 100s/50s | 0/0 | 0/1 |
| Top score | 20 | 60 |
| Catches/stumpings | 0/2 | 1/7 |
- Source: CricketArchive, 14 December 2021

Asma Qureshi Farzand (born 1 January 1981) is a Pakistani former cricketer who played as a wicket-keeper and right-handed batter. Asma made her debut in international cricket in a One Day International (ODI) against Denmark on 10 December 1997.

She appeared in one Test match and eight ODIs for Pakistan in 1997 and 1998.
