= Tudor Gunaratne =

Sri Lankan cricketer (born 1966)

Personal information
- Born: 31 March 1966 (age 60); Kandy, Sri Lanka
- Source: Cricinfo, 10 February 2016

Tudor Gunaratne (born 31 March 1966) is a Sri Lankan former first-class cricketer who played for Kandy Cricket Club and Kandy Youth Cricket Club.
