= Deebah Sherazi =

Pakistani cricketer (born 1980)

Personal information
- Full name: Deebah Farzah Sherazi
- Born: 20 February 1980 (age 46)
- Batting: Right-handed
- Role: All-rounder

International information
- National side: Pakistan (1997–2000)
- Test debut (cap 11): 17 April 1998 v Sri Lanka
- Last Test: 30 July 2000 v Ireland
- ODI debut (cap 19): 12 December 1997 v England
- Last ODI: 1 August 2000 v Ireland

Career statistics
Competition	WTest	WODI
Matches	2	9
Runs scored	18	35
Batting average	4.50	5.00
100s/50s	0/0	0/0
Top score	12	6
Balls bowled	72	56
Wickets	1	1
Bowling average	35.00	55.00
5 wickets in innings	0	0
10 wickets in match	0	0
Best bowling	1/35	1/12
Catches/stumpings	1/–	0/–
- Source: CricketArchive, 12 December 2021

Deebah Farzah Sherazi (born 20 February 1980) is a Pakistani former cricketer who played as an all-rounder.

Deebah made her debut in international cricket in a One Day International (ODI) against England on 12 December 1997. She appeared in two Test matches and nine ODIs for Pakistan between 1997 and 2000.
