= Glenicia James =

Saint Lucian cricketer (born 1974)

Personal information
- Full name: Glenicia James
- Born: 16 June 1974 (age 52); Saint Lucia
- Batting: Right-handed
- Role: Batter

International information
- National side: West Indies (2003)
- ODI debut (cap 39): 13 March 2003 v Sri Lanka
- Last ODI: 22 March 2003 v Sri Lanka

Domestic team information
- Years: Team
- 1994–2003: Saint Lucia

Career statistics
Competition	WODI	WFC	WLA
Matches	5	1	15
Runs scored	116	40	297
Batting average	23.20	40.00	22.84
100s/50s	0/0	0/0	0/0
Top score	46	40	46
Catches/stumpings	0/–	0/–	0/–
- Source: CricketArchive, 15 March 2022

Glenicia James (born 16 June 1974) is a Saint Lucian former cricketer who played as a right-handed batter. She appeared in five One Day Internationals for the West Indies in 2003, all against Sri Lanka. She played domestic cricket for Saint Lucia.
