= Chandrika Lakmalee =

Sri Lankan cricketer (born 1978)

Personal information
- Full name: Kaththri Achige Dona Chandrika Lakmalee
- Born: 27 October 1978 (age 48); Colombo, Sri Lanka
- Batting: Right-handed
- Bowling: Right-arm leg break
- Role: Bowler

International information
- National side: Sri Lanka (1998–2000)
- Only Test (cap 5): 17 April 1998 v Pakistan
- ODI debut (cap 15): 11 April 1998 v Pakistan
- Last ODI: 12 December 2000 v England

Domestic team information
- Years: Team
- 2000: Colts Cricket Club

Career statistics
Competition	WTest	WODI
Matches	1	10
Runs scored	27	28
Batting average	27.00	5.60
100s/50s	0/0	0/0
Top score	14*	21
Balls bowled	66	234
Wickets	0	3
Bowling average	–	56.66
5 wickets in innings	0	0
10 wickets in match	0	0
Best bowling	–	2/19
Catches/stumpings	1/–	0/–
- Source: CricketArchive, 9 December 2021

Kaththri Achige Dona Chandrika Lakmalee (born 27 October 1978) is a Sri Lankan former cricketer who played as a right-arm leg break bowler. She appeared in one Test match and 10 One Day Internationals for Sri Lanka between 1998 and 2000. She was also part of Sri Lanka's squad at the 2000 Women's Cricket World Cup. She played domestic cricket for Colts Cricket Club.
