= N. Rambadagalla =

Sri Lankan cricketer

N. Rambadagalla (full name and details unknown) was a Sri Lankan cricketer who played for Kandy.

Rambadagalla made a single first-class appearance for the side, during the 1992–93 season, against Panadura. From the tailend, he scored 4 runs in the first innings in which he batted, and a duck in the second.

Rambadagalla bowled 7 overs in the match, conceding 24 runs.
