= Kodupulle Indrani =

Sri Lankan cricketer (born 1969)

Personal information
- Full name: Kodupulle Mudiyansalage Indrani
- Born: June 15, 1969 (age 57)

International information
- National side: Sri Lanka
- ODI debut (cap 28): 21 April 2004 v India

Career statistics
Competition	WODI
Matches	1
Runs scored	2
Batting average	2.00
100s/50s	0/0
Top score	2
Balls bowled	6
Wickets	0
Bowling average	–
5 wickets in innings	–
10 wickets in match	–
Best bowling	–
Catches/stumpings	0/0
- Source: Cricinfo, 15 December 2017

Kodupulle Mudiyansalage Indrani (born 15 June 1969) is a former Sri Lankan cricketer. She has played for Sri Lanka in a solitary WODI as a part of the 2004 Women's Asia Cup.
