= Chaturi Thalagalage =

Sri Lankan cricketer

Personal information
- Full name: Chaturi Thalagalage
- Role: Batter

International information
- National side: Sri Lanka (1998–1999)
- Only Test (cap 11): 17 April 1998 v Pakistan
- ODI debut (cap 16): 11 April 1998 v Pakistan
- Last ODI: 30 March 1999 v Netherlands

Domestic team information
- Years: Team
- 2002–2003: Colts Cricket Club

Career statistics
Competition	WTest	WODI
Matches	1	6
Runs scored	16	126
Batting average	8.00	31.50
100s/50s	0/0	0/1
Top score	11	68
Catches/stumpings	0/–	2/–
- Source: CricketArchive, 4 December 2021

Chaturi Thalagalage is a Sri Lankan former cricketer who played as a batter. She appeared in one Test match and six One Day Internationals for Sri Lanka in 1998 and 1999. She played domestic cricket for Colts Cricket Club.

Thalagalage made her One Day International debut on 11 April 1998, playing against Pakistan in Colombo. She scored 19* in the match, which Sri Lanka won by seven wickets. In two further ODIs during that tour, she scored eleven and nought. She played her only Test match during the same tour, scoring eleven and five in a 309-run victory for Sri Lanka over Pakistan. She played one further series: three ODIs against the Netherlands in 1999. In between scores of 21* and 7, she reached her highest total, and only half-century, in international cricket: 68 runs. She did not appear again for Sri Lanka after 1999, and completed her international career with 126 runs in One Day International cricket, at an average of 31.50, and 16 runs in Test cricket, at an average of 8.00.
