= Sadia Butt =

Pakistani cricketer (born 1975)

Personal information
- Full name: Sadia Bano Butt
- Born: 2 March 1975 (age 51); Gujranwala, Pakistan
- Batting: Right-handed
- Bowling: Right-arm medium-fast
- Role: Bowler

International information
- National side: Pakistan (1997–2004)
- Test debut (cap 2): 17 April 1998 v Sri Lanka
- Last Test: 15 March 2004 v West Indies
- ODI debut (cap 17): 10 December 1997 v Denmark
- Last ODI: 2 April 2004 v West Indies

Domestic team information
- Years: Team
- 2005/06–2010/11: Sialkot

Career statistics
Competition	WTest	WODI	WLA
Matches	3	24	35
Runs scored	34	81	153
Batting average	8.50	5.06	5.66
100s/50s	0/0	0/0	0/0
Top score	10	14	29
Balls bowled	156	240	540
Wickets	0	4	9
Bowling average	–	40.25	39.55
5 wickets in innings	0	0	0
10 wickets in match	0	0	0
Best bowling	–	2/23	2/23
Catches/stumpings	2/–	2/–	5/–
- Source: CricketArchive, 14 December 2021

Sadia Bano Butt (born 2 March 1975) is a Pakistani former cricketer who played primarily as a right-arm medium-fast bowler. She appeared in three Test matches and 24 One Day Internationals (ODIs) for Pakistan between 1997 and 2004. She played domestic cricket for Sialkot.

Sadia made her debut in international cricket in an ODI against Denmark on 10 December 1997.

She captained Pakistan in one ODI, against Scotland on 22 July 2003, which Pakistan won by 38 runs.
