= Shazia Hassan =

Pakistani cricketer (born 1980)

Personal information
- Full name: Shazia Abdul Hassan
- Born: 10 November 1980 (age 46); Lahore, Pakistan
- Batting: Right-handed
- Role: Bowler

International information
- National side: Pakistan (1997–1998)
- Only Test (cap 4): 17 April 1998 v Sri Lanka
- ODI debut (cap 18): 10 December 1997 v Denmark
- Last ODI: 15 April 1998 v Sri Lanka

Career statistics
Competition	WTest	WODI
Matches	1	4
Runs scored	7	3
Batting average	3.50	1.00
100s/50s	0/0	0/0
Top score	6	2
Balls bowled	12	6
Wickets	0	0
Bowling average	–	–
5 wickets in innings	0	0
10 wickets in match	0	0
Best bowling	–	–
Catches/stumpings	0/–	0/–
- Source: CricketArchive, 14 December 2021

Shazia Abdul Hassan (born 10 November 1980) is a Pakistani former cricketer who played as a bowler.

Shazia made her debut in international cricket in a One Day International (ODI) against Denmark on 10 December 1997. She appeared in one Test match and four One Day Internationals for Pakistan in 1997 and 1998.
