= Dedunu Gunaratne =

Sri Lankan cricketer

Personal information
- Full name: Dedunu Gunaratne
- Batting: Right-handed
- Role: Batter
- Relatives: Thalika Gunaratne (sister)

International information
- National side: Sri Lanka (1998)
- Only Test (cap 4): 17 April 1998 v Pakistan
- ODI debut (cap 17): 13 April 1998 v Pakistan
- Last ODI: 15 April 1998 v Pakistan

Career statistics
Competition	WTest	WODI
Matches	1	2
Runs scored	55	72
Batting average	27.50	72.00
100s/50s	0/0	0/1
Top score	29	57*
Catches/stumpings	0/–	0/–
- Source: CricketArchive, 9 December 2021

Dedunu Gunaratne is a Sri Lankan former cricketer who played as a right-handed batter. She appeared in one Test match and two One Day Internationals for Sri Lanka in 1998.

She played all three of her international matches against Pakistan, on their tour in 1998. She scored 55 runs in her two Test innings, and 72 in her two ODIs. She made her ODI debut in the second match of the one-day series against Pakistan, opening the batting. Her score of 57* helped Sri Lanka to a 4-wicket victory.
