= Pamela Alfred =

Saint Lucian cricketer (born 1978)

Personal information
- Full name: Pamela Alfred
- Born: 28 September 1978 (age 48); Saint Lucia
- Batting: Right-handed
- Bowling: Right-arm medium
- Role: All-rounder

International information
- National side: West Indies (2003)
- ODI debut (cap 36): 13 March 2003 v Sri Lanka
- Last ODI: 20 March 2003 v Sri Lanka

Domestic team information
- Years: Team
- 1999–2008: Saint Lucia

Career statistics
Competition	WODI	WLA
Matches	4	19
Runs scored	53	418
Batting average	13.25	34.83
100s/50s	0/0	0/2
Top score	40	57
Balls bowled	156	222
Wickets	3	12
Bowling average	30.33	17.37
5 wickets in innings	0	0
10 wickets in match	0	0
Best bowling	2/32	4/?
Catches/stumpings	2/–	2/–
- Source: CricketArchive, 15 March 2022

Pamela Alfred (born 28 September 1978) is a Saint Lucian former cricketer who played as a right-handed batter and right-arm medium bowler. She appeared in four One Day Internationals for the West Indies in 2003, all against Sri Lanka. She played domestic cricket for Saint Lucia.
