= Guy de Alwis =

Sri Lankan cricketer (1959–2013)

Personal information
- Born: 15 February 1959; Colombo, Sri Lanka
- Died: 12 January 2013 (aged 53); Colombo, Sri Lanka
- Batting: Right-handed
- Relatives: Rasanjali Silva (spouse)

International information
- National side: Sri Lanka (1983–1988)
- Test debut (cap 13): 4 March 1983 v England
- Last Test: 12 February 1988 v Australia
- ODI debut (cap 29): 2 March 1983 v New Zealand
- Last ODI: 31 March 1988 v New Zealand

Career statistics
Competition	Test	ODI
Matches	11	31
Runs scored	152	401
Batting average	8.00	21.10
100s/50s	0/0	0/2
Top score	28	59*
Catches/stumpings	21/2	27/3
- Source: Cricinfo, 9 February 2016

Ronald Guy de Alwis (15 February 1959 – 12 January 2013) was a Sri Lankan cricketer who played in 11 Test matches and 31 One Day Internationals from 1983 to 1988.

De Alwis was married to Sri Lankan Women's cricketer Rasanjali Silva.
