= Vanessa Bowen =

Sri Lankan cricketer (born 1974)

Personal information
- Full name: Vanessa Bowen
- Born: 26 September 1974 (age 52); Colombo, Sri Lanka
- Batting: Right-handed
- Bowling: Right-arm medium
- Role: Batsman

International information
- National side: Sri Lanka (1997–1999)
- Only Test (cap 1): 17 April 1998 v Pakistan
- ODI debut (cap 1): 25 November 1997 v Netherlands
- Last ODI: 30 March 1999 v Netherlands

Domestic team information
- Years: Team
- 2000: Colts Cricket Club

Career statistics
Competition	WTest	WODI
Matches	1	13
Runs scored	141	291
Batting average	70.50	32.33
100s/50s	0/2	0/2
Top score	78	51*
Balls bowled	12	60
Wickets	0	0
Bowling average	–	–
5 wickets in innings	0	0
10 wickets in match	0	0
Best bowling	–	–
Catches/stumpings	1/–	3/–
- Source: CricketArchive, 10 December 2021

Vanessa Bowen (born 26 September 1974) is a Sri Lankan former cricketer who played as a right-handed batter. She appeared in one Test match and 13 One Day Internationals for Sri Lanka between 1997 and 1999, including captaining the side during their 1997 series against the Netherlands and at the 1997 World Cup. She played domestic cricket for Colts Cricket Club.

In Sri Lanka's only Test match, she scored 78 in the first innings and 63 in the second innings, becoming the first and only Sri Lankan woman cricketer to score twin fifties on Test debut.
