= Shane de Silva =

Trinidadian cricketer and football referee

Personal information
- Full name: Shane Calisa de Silva
- Born: 22 September 1972 (age 54); Trinidad
- Batting: Left-handed
- Bowling: Slow left-arm orthodox
- Role: All-rounder

International information
- National side: West Indies (2003–2005)
- ODI debut (cap 42): 13 March 2003 v Sri Lanka
- Last ODI: 9 April 2005 v South Africa

Domestic team information
- Years: Team
- 2001–2004: Trinidad and Tobago

Career statistics
Competition	WODI	WLA
Matches	18	29
Runs scored	173	434
Batting average	15.72	24.11
100s/50s	0/0	0/2
Top score	38*	69*
Balls bowled	243	327
Wickets	7	12
Bowling average	27.00	22.72
5 wickets in innings	0	0
10 wickets in match	0	0
Best bowling	2/17	2/17
Catches/stumpings	2/–	4/–
- Source: CricketArchive, 9 June 2021

Shane Calisa de Silva (born 22 September 1972) is a Trinidadian former cricketer and FIFA-certified football referee.

As a cricketer, she played as a left-handed batter and slow left-arm orthodox bowler. She appeared in 18 One Day Internationals for the West Indies between 2003 and 2005, making her debut at the age of 31. She played domestic cricket for Trinidad and Tobago.

She is a FIFA licensed referee, registered in Trinidad and Tobago since 2002.
