= Ganga de Silva =

Sri Lankan cricketer

Personal information
- Full name: P Ganga N de Silva

International information
- National side: Sri Lanka
- ODI debut (cap 13): 30 November 1997 v Netherlands
- Last ODI: 11 December 1997 v West Indies

Career statistics
Competition	WODI
Matches	2
Runs scored	12
Batting average	6.00
100s/50s	0/0
Top score	6
Catches/stumpings	0/0
- Source: Cricinfo, 31 December 2021

Ganga de Silva is a Sri Lankan woman cricketer. She has played for Sri Lanka in 2 Women's ODIs.
