= Kalpana Liyanarachchi =

Sri Lankan cricketer (born 1973)

Personal information
- Full name: Kalpana Harshani Liyanarachchi
- Born: 4 June 1973 (age 53); Colombo, Sri Lanka
- Nickname: Kalpi
- Batting: Right-handed
- Bowling: Right-arm medium
- Role: All-rounder

International information
- National side: Sri Lanka (1997–2000)
- Only Test (cap 6): 17 April 1998 v Pakistan
- ODI debut (cap 12): 29 November 1997 v Netherlands
- Last ODI: 12 December 2000 v England

Domestic team information
- Years: Team
- 2000: Slimline Sports Club

Career statistics
Competition	WTest	WODI
Matches	1	16
Runs scored	20	63
Batting average	10.00	4.84
100s/50s	0/0	0/0
Top score	20	19
Balls bowled	66	36
Wickets	0	0
Bowling average	–	–
5 wickets in innings	0	0
10 wickets in match	0	0
Best bowling	–	–
Catches/stumpings	2/–	1/–
- Source: CricketArchive, 8 December 2021

Kalpana Harshani Liyanarachchi (born 4 June 1973) is a Sri Lankan former cricketer who played as a right-handed batter and right-arm medium bowler. She appeared in one Test match and 16 One Day Internationals for Sri Lanka between 1997 and 2000, including being part of their squads at the 1997 and 2000 World Cups. She played domestic cricket for Slimline Sports Club.
