= Devinder Sharma =

Indian cricket umpire (born 1950)

Personal information
- Born: 20 January 1950 (age 76)

Umpiring information
- ODIs umpired: 1 (2001)
- WODIs umpired: 4 (1997–2005)
- Source: ESPNcricinfo, 30 May 2014

Devinder Dutt Sharma (born 20 January 1950) is a former Indian cricket umpire. In his international umpiring career, he stood in only a single ODI game, in 2001.

== See also ==
- List of One Day International cricket umpires
