= Maaike Schroeder =

Dutch cricketer

Maaike Schröeder
Personal information
- Born: 1971 (age 54–55)
- Batting: Right-handed
- Role: Wicket-keeper

International information
- National side: Netherlands (1997–1998)
- ODI debut (cap 42): 25 November 1997 v Sri Lanka
- Last ODI: 26 July 1998 v Denmark

Career statistics
Competition	WODI
Matches	9
Runs scored	21
Batting average	3.50
100s/50s	0/0
Top score	11
Catches/stumpings	3/1
- Source: CricketArchive, 18 October 2015

Maaike Schröeder-Bink (born 1971) is a former Dutch international cricketer whose career for the Dutch national women's side spanned from 1997 to 1998. A wicket-keeper and right-handed batsman, she played in nine One Day International (ODI) matches, including at the 1997 World Cup.

Schroeder made her ODI debut for the Netherlands in November 1997, playing three matches against Sri Lanka. The tour was a warm-up for the World Cup in India the following month, where she had been selected as the only wicket-keeper in the squad. At the World Cup, Schroeder scored only six runs from her three innings. In her first match, against New Zealand, she came in seventh in the batting order, but she was later demoted to ninth. Schroeder's last ODI matches came in July 1998, when she played both games of a two-match series against Denmark. In the second match, she recorded the only stumping of her international career, dismissing Danish opener Mette Frost from the bowling of Nicola Payne. Schroeder's replacement as wicket-keeper was Martika Flieringa, who played only four ODIs before herself being replaced.

Schröeder's main sport is field hockey and she played in the first team for HDM and won the Euro Hockeymasters Tournament with the Dutch 40+ team in London in 2015. She is a marketing manager and spokesperson for the Sea Life Scheveningen Aquarium.
