= Chandra Dharma Sena Gooneratne =

Sri Lankan philosopher and academic (1899–1981)

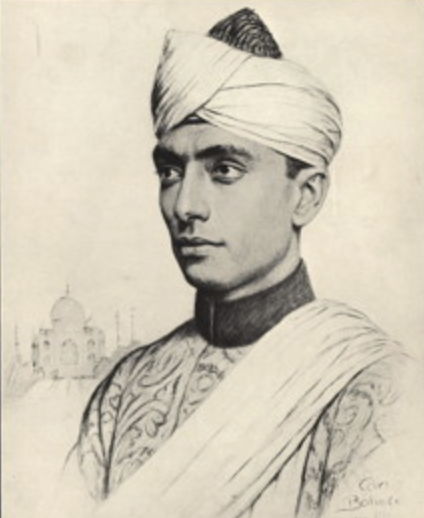
- Gooneratne in a 1920s pamphlet promoting his "lectures on India"

Personal details
- Born: 1899 Colombo, British Ceylon
- Died: September 8, 1981 (aged 81–82) Colombo, Sri Lanka
- Education: Edinburgh University; University of Chicago (PhB, 1927; MA, 1928; PhD, 1933); Trinity College, Cambridge
- Occupation: Indologist; poet; diplomat; military officer
- Nickname: Tan Stranger

Military service
- Allegiance: United Kingdom
- Years of service: 1917–1918; 1939–1946
- Rank: Captain
- Battles/wars: World War I World War II

Chandra Dharma Sena Gooneratne (1899 – September 8, 1981), also known as the Tan Stranger, was a Sri Lankan Indologist, poet, diplomat, and military officer. During the 1920s and 1930s, he was a lecturer situated in America, specializing in Indology.

A believer in the principle of liberty, Gooneratne was an outspoken advocate for the Indian independence movement, as well as anti-casteism. Later in his life, during the 1950s, he worked in the U.S. Embassy in his home country as an advisor.

== Background ==
Chandra Dharma Sena Gooneratne was born in 1899 in Colombo, British Ceylon (present-day Sri Lanka), to Sinhalese Baptist parents, J. W. and Ellen Gooneratne. He had three sisters, namely H. A. and W. A. Goonetilleke and F. W. Gunaskare. The family was described along the lines of "old" and "high-caste," owning "several landed estates."

Little is known about Gooneratne's childhood, aside from the fact that he attended the local school Trinity College, Kandy.

== Military service ==
=== World War I ===
Sometime in the 1910s, Gooneratne had moved to Britain, enlisting in the military during World War I as a welfare officer, ultimately earning the captain rank honorarily. He reportedly went to a variety of places during the conflict, including Mesopotamia (present-day Iraq), Persia (present-day Iran), and Flanders, Belgium. Upon his discharge, he was said to have attended Edinburgh University.

=== World War II ===
During World War II, Gooneratne was a welfare officer for the British Expeditionary Force, as he was in World War I years prior. He worked alongside Gate Mudaliyar A. C. G. S. Amarasekara, a prominent Sri Lankan painter—together, they were stationed in Paris. It was reported that Gooneratne demonstrated "a few Sinhala tricks" to the Nazis he encountered there. One day, Amarasekera went missing in the city; they, nonetheless, found him in a church, "admiring the frescoes and the paintings." Gooneratne and his search party were said to have been "greatly relieved" upon being ensured of his safety.

== Academic pursuits & public engagements in America ==
=== University of Chicago ===
The 1920s saw him relocate yet again, this time to America, where he would obtain three degrees at the University of Chicago. His inaugural degree was in comparative religion, and he was said to have studied under Eustace Haydon, a historian and theologian, known for his involvement in the humanist movement.

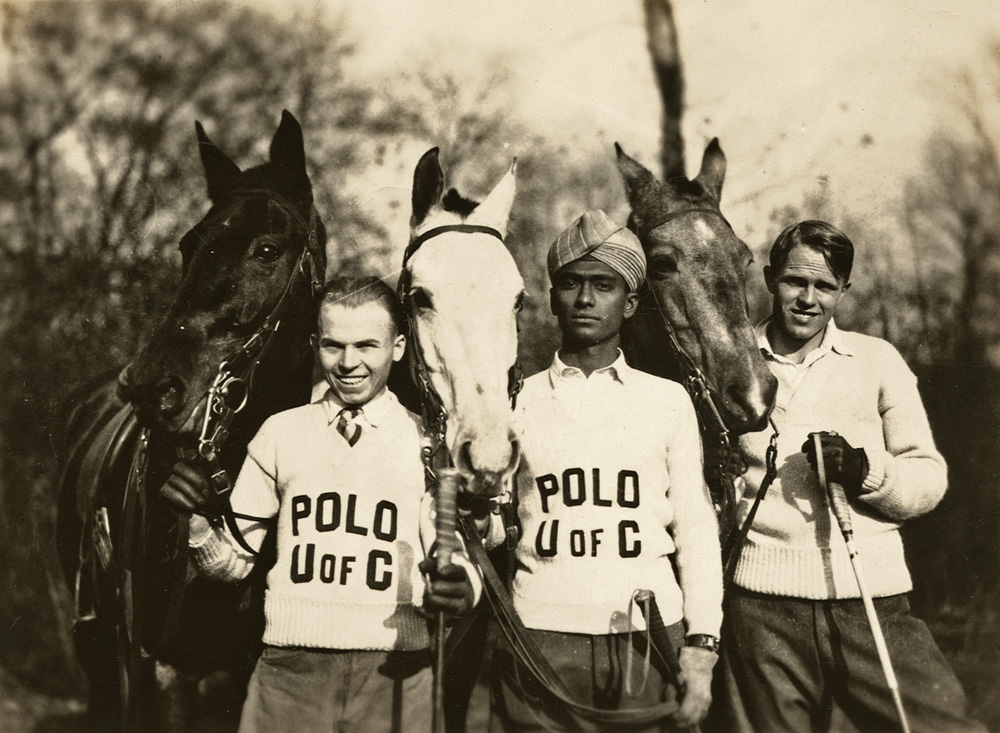
Gooneratne, positioned among his university polo teammates, c. 1926

He would establish himself in the academy as a competent orator, participating in local radio shows and delivering public talks on current events and cultural topics in India—a country that he noted is home to "one-fifth of the human race." Inspired by Mahatma Gandhi and Rabindranath Tagore, Gooneratne called for an end to British rule two decades before Indian independence. He wrote once that "No nation ever rose to greatness by allotting to certain of its members fixed positions in the social scheme." He spoke against the caste system as well.

Gooneratne was also a voracious polo player, captaining his university's team, and was said to have broken his back during a game.

=== Nationwide public lecture tour ===
In the summer of 1928, he lectured on the Chautauqua circuit, visiting small towns in Iowa, Minnesota, Wisconsin, and Michigan. A flyer for his talks stated his mission: "to bring to Americans a true idea of India as she is today; as she has been in the past; as she hopes to be in the future." His work was said to have been similar to that of other South Asian speakers touring the U.S. during that time, as noted in the book Desi Divas.

==== Confrontation of Jim Crow segregation ====
He later traveled to the American South during his tour, where he encountered Jim Crow segregation, purportedly wearing a turban to circumvent discrimination. He was quoted as saying, "any Asiatic can evade the whole issue of color in America by winding a few yards of linen around his head—a turban makes anyone an Indian."

When he boarded the "southbound" train, he sat in the colored train coach. However, the conductor had recognized that Gooneratne was in fact not a black man, and suggested that he sit in the coach designated for whites, which Gooneratne declined, inquiring, "Are the seats better up there?—Softer? Deeper? You must have better seats up there. Otherwise, why would you have mentioned my changing."

=== Authorship ===
In 1933, he wrote a book on the political history of India, titled The Development of Political Consciousness in India, 1757–1931, wherein he explores the evolution of political awareness and the emergence of a national consciousness in British India from the mid-18th century until the early 20th century.

A year later, Gooneratne won a scholarship at Trinity College, Cambridge.

== Diplomacy ==
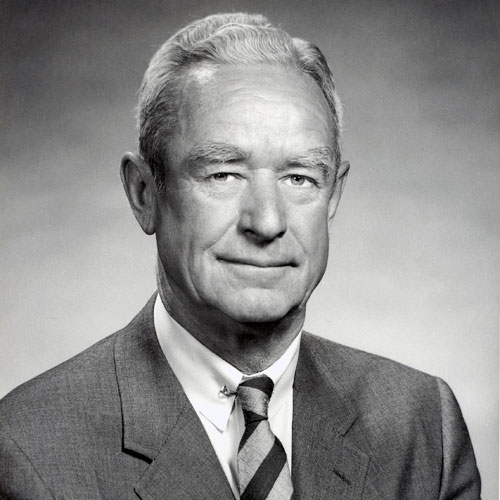
Philip K. Crowe, c. 1969–1973, United States Ambassador to Ceylon from 1953 to 1957

In 1949, Gooneratne took on the role of advisor to the U.S. Embassy in Colombo, serving in that position for a total of eight years. During this time, he became an avid hunter, once shooting "two brace of succulent pigeons" with John Friar, an attaché of the Embassy. Due to his expertise, he was elected vice president of the Ceylon Hunting Club. He also formed a friendship with Philip K. Crowe, who served as the ambassador to Ceylon from 1953 to 1957.

== Personal life ==
In the 1940s, while still a bachelor serving in the British forces during World War II, he met an English woman named Margaret, whom he later married. He died on September 8, 1981, in Colombo, Sri Lanka; soon after, his wife retired and remigrated to Britain.
