= Rasanjali Silva =

Sri Lankan cricketer (born 1971)

Personal information
- Full name: Sendapperuma Archchige Rasanjali Chandima Silva
- Born: 26 November 1971 (age 54); Colombo, Ceylon
- Batting: Left-handed
- Bowling: Right-arm medium
- Role: All-rounder
- Relatives: Guy de Alwis (husband)

International information
- National side: Sri Lanka (1997–2000)
- Only Test (cap 10): 17 April 1998 v Pakistan
- ODI debut (cap 10): 25 November 1997 v Netherlands
- Last ODI: 15 December 2000 v India

Domestic team information
- Years: Team
- 2000: Slimline Sports Club

Career statistics
Competition	WTest	WODI
Matches	1	22
Runs scored	26	256
Batting average	13.00	14.22
100s/50s	0/0	0/1
Top score	26	53
Balls bowled	264	1,093
Wickets	8	23
Bowling average	7.12	23.08
5 wickets in innings	0	0
10 wickets in match	0	0
Best bowling	4/27	4/16
Catches/stumpings	2/–	6/–
- Source: CricketArchive, 4 December 2021

Sendapperuma Archchige Rasanjali Chandima de Alwis (née Silva; born 26 November 1971) is a Sri Lankan former cricketer who played as a left-handed batter and right-arm medium bowler. She appeared in one Test match and 22 One Day Internationals for Sri Lanka between 1997 and 2000. She was also part of the team that represented Sri Lanka at the 1997 and 2000 World Cups. She played domestic cricket for Slimline Sports Club.

Silva later married Sri Lankan cricketer Guy de Alwis, becoming the second married couple to have both played Test cricket.
