= Sabeen Rezvi =

Pakistani cricketer (born 1984)

Sabeen Rezvi, Mishi's Khala
Personal information
- Full name: Sabeen Rezvi
- Born: 10 December 1984 (age 41); Karachi, Sindh, Pakistan
- Batting: Right-handed
- Bowling: Right-arm off break
- Role: Bowler

International information
- National side: Pakistan (2002)
- ODI debut (cap 30): 20 January 2002 v Sri Lanka
- Last ODI: 30 January 2002 v Sri Lanka

Career statistics
Competition	WODI
Matches	6
Runs scored	3
Batting average	0.75
100s/50s	0/0
Top score	2
Balls bowled	18
Wickets	0
Bowling average	–
5 wickets in innings	0
10 wickets in match	0
Best bowling	–
Catches/stumpings	0/–
- Source: CricketArchive, 8 January 2022

Sabeen Rezvi (born 10 December 1984) is a Pakistani former cricketer who played as a right-arm off break bowler. She appeared in six One Day Internationals for Pakistan in 2002, all against Sri Lanka in 2002.
