= Pradeep Munidasa =

Sri Lankan cricketer (born 1978)

Pradeep Munidasa (full name Puwakdandawe Katuwanagamage Nishantha Pradeep Munidasa; born 12 August 1978) was a Sri Lankan cricketer. He was a right-handed batsman and right-arm medium-pace bowler who played for Kandy Cricket Club. He was born in Kandy.

Munidasa made a single first-class appearance for the side, during the 2002–03 season, against Kurunegala Youth Cricket Club. From the tailend, he scored 3 not out in the first innings in which he batted, and 5 runs in the second.

He bowled 6 overs in the match, conceding 36 runs.
