= Kirsten Zorab =

Dutch cricketer

Personal information
- Born: 1974 (age 51–52)
- Batting: Right-handed
- Bowling: Right-arm slow
- Role: Bowler

International information
- National side: Netherlands (1997–2002)
- ODI debut (cap 43): 30 November 1997 v Sri Lanka
- Last ODI: 28 June 2002 v New Zealand

Career statistics
Competition	WODI
Matches	5
Runs scored	2
Batting average	0.66
100s/50s	0/0
Top score	2
Balls bowled	198
Wickets	0
Bowling average	–
5 wickets in innings	–
10 wickets in match	–
Best bowling	–
Catches/stumpings	0/–
- Source: CricketArchive, 20 October 2015

Kirsten Zorab (born 1974) is a former Dutch cricketer whose international career for the Dutch national side spanned from 1997 to 2002. She played in five One Day International (ODI) matches, including a single game at the 1997 World Cup.

Zorab made her senior debut for the Netherlands in November 1997, playing a single ODI against Sri Lanka in Kandy. That tour of Sri Lanka was part of the Dutch team's preparation for the World Cup, which was held in India the following month. At the World Cup, Zorab was selected in only one match, the quarter-final against Australia, where she conceded 23 runs from three overs without taking a wicket. She did not appear in another fixture for the national team until June 2002, when New Zealand toured the Netherlands for a three-match ODI series. Zorab opened the bowling in the first two matches, partnering first with Eugenie van Leeuwen and then with Jolet Hartenhof, but went wicketless as her team twice slumped to heavy defeats. In the third match, the last of her career, she took 0/31 from seven overs, consequently finishing her international career without a single wicket.
