= Rabia Khan =

Pakistani cricketer (born 1985)

Personal information
- Full name: Rabia Khan
- Born: 5 June 1985 (age 41); Peshawar, North-West Frontier Province, Pakistan
- Batting: Right-handed
- Bowling: Right-arm medium
- Role: All-rounder

International information
- National side: Pakistan (2001–2002)
- ODI debut (cap 29): 9 April 2001 v Netherlands
- Last ODI: 30 January 2002 v Sri Lanka

Career statistics
Competition	WODI
Matches	13
Runs scored	162
Batting average	12.46
100s/50s	0/0
Top score	26
Balls bowled	198
Wickets	5
Bowling average	22.20
5 wickets in innings	0
10 wickets in match	0
Best bowling	3/13
Catches/stumpings	9/–
- Source: CricketArchive, 8 January 2022

Rabia Khan (born 5 June 1985) is a Pakistani former cricketer who played as an all-rounder, batting right-handed and bowling right-arm medium. She appeared in 13 One Day Internationals for Pakistan in 2001 and 2002.
