= Brenda Solzano-Rodney =

West Indian cricketer (born 1962)

Personal information
- Full name: Brenda Solzano-Rodney
- Born: 22 October 1962 (age 64); Trinidad
- Batting: Right-handed
- Bowling: Right-arm off break
- Role: Batter; occasional wicket-keeper

International information
- National side: West Indies (1997–2003)
- ODI debut (cap 32): 11 December 1997 v Sri Lanka
- Last ODI: 23 March 2003 v Sri Lanka

Domestic team information
- Years: Team
- 1991–2005: Trinidad and Tobago

Career statistics
Competition	WODI	WFC	WLA
Matches	6	2	30
Runs scored	54	46	791
Batting average	9.00	46.00	34.39
100s/50s	0/0	0/0	0/3
Top score	42	25	79*
Balls bowled	–	–	30
Wickets	–	–	2
Bowling average	–	–	27.00
5 wickets in innings	–	–	0
10 wickets in match	–	–	0
Best bowling	–	–	1/27
Catches/stumpings	1/1	0/–	2/1
- Source: CricketArchive, 27 March 2022

Brenda Solzano-Rodney (née Solzano; born 22 October 1962) is a Trinidadian former cricketer who played as a right-handed batter and occasional wicket-keeper. She appeared in six One Day Internationals for the West Indies between 1997 and 2003. She played domestic cricket for Trinidad and Tobago.
