= Nimal Gunaratne =

Air Vice Marshal (Dr) Nimal Herat-Gunaratne
- Born: Colombo, Sri Lanka
- Military career
- Allegiance: Sri Lanka
- Branch: Sri Lanka Air Force
- Service years: 34
- Rank: Air Vice Marshal
- Commands: Director Health Services
- Conflicts: Sri Lankan Civil War
- Awards: Vishista Seva Vibhushanaya, Uttama Seva Padakkama

Air Vice Marshal Nimal Herat-Gunaratne, VSV, USP, SLAF was the Director Health Services of the Sri Lanka Air Force from 1992 to 2011 (19 years).

Educated at the Royal College, Colombo, he graduated with a MBBS degree from the University of Colombo. Thereafter, he joined the Sri Lanka Air Force as a direct entry officer in the Medical Branch. After successful completion of basic training, he was commissioned as a Flight Lieutenant. He holds a Diploma in Family Medicine and two Diplomas in Aviation medicine from the Bangalore University and the Royal College of Physicians. He is a member of the special panel of medical examiners of the Civil Aviation Authority of Sri Lanka

Air Vice Marshal Gunaratne has been awarded the service medals Vishista Seva Vibhushanaya, Uttama Seva Padakkama and Sri Lanka Armed Services Long Service Medal.
