= Nazia Nazir =

Pakistani cricketer (born 1978)

Personal information
- Full name: Nazia Tabassum Nazir
- Born: 9 January 1978 (age 48); Gujranwala, Pakistan
- Batting: Right-handed
- Bowling: Right-arm medium
- Role: All-rounder

International information
- National side: Pakistan (1997–2004)
- Test debut (cap 9): 17 April 1998 v Sri Lanka
- Last Test: 15 March 2004 v West Indies
- ODI debut (cap 14): 10 December 1997 v Denmark
- Last ODI: 2 April 2004 v West Indies

Domestic team information
- Years: Team
- 2005/06–2011/12: Sialkot

Career statistics
Competition	WTest	WODI	WLA	WT20
Matches	3	30	47	10
Runs scored	8	342	842	77
Batting average	1.33	11.79	20.04	12.83
100s/50s	0/0	0/0	0/4	0/0
Top score	5	30	91*	34*
Balls bowled	270	681	1,315	113
Wickets	7	14	33	6
Bowling average	22.85	33.35	27.96	16.66
5 wickets in innings	0	0	0	0
10 wickets in match	0	0	0	0
Best bowling	4/66	3/35	4/20	2/4
Catches/stumpings	2/–	3/2	10/2	1/–
- Source: CricketArchive, 12 December 2021

Nazia Tabassum Nazir (born 9 January 1978) is a Pakistani former cricketer who played as an all-rounder, batting right-handed and bowling right-arm medium.

Nazia made her debut in international cricket in a One Day International (ODI) against Denmark on 10 December 1997.

She appeared in three Test matches and 30 ODIs for Pakistan between 1997 and 2004. She played domestic cricket for Sialkot.
