= Ramani Perera =

Sri Lankan cricketer (born 1976)

Personal information
- Full name: Kurunegalage Ramani Perera
- Born: 29 August 1976 (age 50); Colombo, Sri Lanka
- Batting: Right-handed
- Bowling: Right-arm leg break
- Role: All-rounder

International information
- National side: Sri Lanka (1997–2002)
- Only Test (cap 7): 17 April 1998 v Pakistan
- ODI debut (cap 7): 25 November 1997 v Netherlands
- Last ODI: 30 January 2002 v Pakistan

Domestic team information
- Years: Team
- 2000–2002: Slimline Sports Club
- 2012/13: Colts Cricket Club

Career statistics
Competition	WTest	WODI	WLA
Matches	1	19	26
Runs scored	27	83	112
Batting average	13.50	8.30	7.00
100s/50s	0/0	0/0	0/0
Top score	23	13*	14*
Balls bowled	–	506	523
Wickets	–	23	25
Bowling average	–	12.26	11.84
5 wickets in innings	–	0	0
10 wickets in match	–	0	0
Best bowling	–	4/18	4/18
Catches/stumpings	0/–	10/–	12/–
- Source: CricketArchive, 8 December 2021

Kurunegalage Ramani Perera (born 29 August 1976) is a Sri Lankan former cricketer who played as a right-arm leg break bowler and right-handed batter. She appeared in one Test match and 19 Women's One Day Internationals for Sri Lanka between 1997 and 2002. She was also part of the team that represented Sri Lanka at the 1997 and 2000 World Cups. She played domestic cricket for Slimline Sports Club and Colts Cricket Club.
