= Anil Goonaratne =

Puisne Justice of the Supreme Court of Sri Lanka
- In office 30 January 2015 – 30 May 2018

Judge of the Court of Appeal of Sri Lanka
- In office 27 January 2007 – 30 January 2015

Personal details
- Education: University of Exeter, Colombo Law College, Royal College Colombo

Anil Goonaratne is a Sri Lankan judge and lawyer. He is a former judge of the Supreme Court of Sri Lanka, having served as a judge of the Court of Appeal and Additional Solicitor General.

Born to A. W. Gooneratne, a former High Court Judge, he was educated at Royal College Colombo. Goonaratne studied law at the Ceylon Law College and took oaths as an Attorney at Law in 1978. Having started his legal practice in the unofficial bar, he joined the Attorney General's Department as a State Counsel in 1979 and later gained an LLM form the University of Exeter. He was thereafter promoted to Senior States Counsel, Deputy Solicitor General and Additional Solicitor General before being appointed to the Court of Appeal as a Judge in January 2007. Former President Mahinda Rajapaksa overlooked him several times for the post of President of the Court of Appeal as he was a member of the bench which issued a certiorari quashing the report of the Parliamentary Select Committee on the impeachment against the then Chief Justice Shirani Bandaranayake. In January 2015, as the most senior Appeal Court Judge, he was appointed to the Supreme Court. He retired from judiciary in December 2017. In February 2018, he was appointed as head of the Presidential Commission of Inquiry appointed to probe the management of SriLankan Airlines and Mihin Lanka during the period of January 2006 to January 2018.

He was married to the late Ruwani Gooneratne, they had a son and a daughter. Their son Rajin Wickrama Gooneratne is a States Counsel in the Attorney General's Department.
