= Hiroshi Abeysinghe =

Sri Lankan cricketer

Personal information
- Born: 2 November 1978 (age 48); Colombo, Sri Lanka
- Batting: Right-handed
- Bowling: Right-arm off-spin
- Role: Bowler

International information
- National side: Sri Lanka (2000–2006)
- ODI debut (cap 19): 1 December 2000 v Australia
- Last ODI: 21 December 2006 v India
- Source: CricketArchive, 20 August 2016

Amathagodage Don Hiroshi Abeysinghe (born 2 November 1978) is a former Sri Lankan international cricketer and internationally qualified cricket coach.

== International playing career ==
As a player, Abeysinghe represented the Sri Lankan national team between 1999 and 2006. An all-rounder, Abeysinghe batted right-handed and bowled right-arm off-spin.

She was a member of the Sri Lanka Women's cricket team for the visiting Pakistan team, and for the tour of India in 1999.

Abeysinghe made her international debut at the 2000 Women's World Cup in New Zealand. She played in all seven of her team's matches, and made 186 runs to finish as Sri Lanka's leading run-scorer. Her highest score, 57 runs from 116 balls, came against England, while she also made 52 runs from 112 balls against Ireland.

After the World Cup, Abeysinghe next played at One Day International (ODI) level in January 2002, in a series against Pakistan. She equaled her personal best in the first match of the series, making 57 runs from 65 balls, and in the fourth match made what was to be the highest score of her ODI career, 71 not out from 103 balls. Also in 2002, she toured New Zealand in 2002 for the Indoor Cricket World Cup Tournament.

In 2003, she toured West Indies for the International Women's Cricket Tournament.

Abeysinghe was Vice Captain for the Sri Lanka Women's Cricket Team when they played the touring England Team in Sri Lanka in 2005. She was also part of the national team that toured Pakistan for the Women's Cricket Asia Cup in December 2005.

Hiroshi Abeysinghe finished her international career after the 2006 Women's Asia Cup in India, having played 31 ODIs in total.

== Coaching career ==
Since retiring from playing international cricket, Abeysinghe has qualified as a cricket coach. She has held positions such as:

Assistant Coach for the Sri Lanka National Women's cricket team for the Women's Cricket Asia Cup held in 2008.

Liaison Officer for the Sri Lanka National Women's cricket team to various visiting teams, including Pakistan, South Africa, West Indies and England teams between 2012 and 2015.

Manager of the Sri Lanka National Women's cricket team for visiting Australian team in September 2016 and the England team in November 2016.

Head Coach of Sri Lanka Navy Women's cricket team winning the domestic Sri Lanka Women's Championship five times (2011 to 2015, twice unbeaten in 2011 and 2012), and the Sri Lanka Women's Defense Cricket League twice (2012 and 2013) with the first team.

As of 2017, she is coaching an Abu Dhabi women's cricket team and part of the coaching staff at Abu Dhabi Cricket.

== Early life ==
Abeysinghe was born in Colombo.

== Playing honours and achievements ==
A women's cricket world record of an unbroken second wicket partnership of 384 runs with Sandamali Dolawatta

Awarded ‘Best Female Cricketer in Sri Lanka’, 2000

Best Sri Lankan batting performance in World Cup, New Zealand 2000

== Coaching qualifications ==
In 2008, Abeysinghe became the first female cricketer from Sri Lanka to be awarded a Scholarship to study for a Certificate of Higher Education in Sports Coaching (Cricket) at Newcastle College in United Kingdom.

Accredited as a qualified ICC level 2 cricket coach (UKCC 2) in England & Wales Cricket Board

Accredited as a qualified ICC level 1 cricket coach (UKCC 1) in England & Wales Cricket Board

Member of England and Wales Cricket Board Coaching Association

Umpiring (Law of Cricket) conducted by the Board of Control for Cricket in Sri Lanka
