= Dumila Dedunu =

Sri Lankan cricketer (born 1979)

Personal information
- Born: 1 March 1979 (age 47)
- Role: wicketkeeper

International information
- National side: Sri Lanka

Career statistics
| Competition | WODI |
|---|---|
| Matches | 4 |
| Runs scored | 9 |
| Batting average | – |
| 100s/50s | 0/0 |
| Top score | 6* |
| Catches/stumpings | 4/3 |
- Source: Cricinfo, 10 December 2017

Ramma Waduge Dumila Dedunu (born 1 March 1979) is a former Sri Lankan cricketer. She has played for Sri Lanka in four Women's One Day Internationals.
