= Suthershini Sivanantham =

Sri Lankan and Canadian cricketer

Personal information
- Full name: Suthershini Sivanantham
- Born: 20 December 1973 (age 52); Colombo, Sri Lanka
- Batting: Right-handed
- Bowling: Right-arm off-spin

International information
- National sides: Sri Lanka (1997/98–2002/03); Canada (2010–2013)
- ODI debut (cap 11): 25 November 1997; Sri Lanka v Netherlands
- Last ODI: 23 March 2003; Sri Lanka v West Indies

Career statistics
Competition	ODI
Matches	27
Runs scored	86
Batting average	8.60
100s/50s	0/0
Top score	36
Balls bowled	1,130
Wickets	35
Bowling average	14.54
5 wickets in innings	1
10 wickets in match	0
Best bowling	5/2
Catches/stumpings	14/–
- Source: CricketArchive, 14 May 2016

Suthershini Sivanantham (Tamil: ஸுதர்ஷிநி ஶிவநாதம்; born 20 December 1973) is a former cricketer who played international cricket for and captained Sri Lanka and Canada, and played domestic cricket for Colts Women. Sivanantham was an off-spin bowler.

== Sri Lanka career ==
Sivanantham made her Women's One Day International cricket debut for Sri Lanka in a 1997/8 match against The Netherlands, taking 1/16 from 8 overs, and making 10*. She played three matches in the 1997 Women's Cricket World Cup, taking 4 wickets; only Thalika Gunaratne took more wickets for Sri Lanka in the tournament. Sivanantham was vice-captain of the Sri Lankan team for the 2000 Women's Cricket World Cup, and was the captain of the team for a 2001/02 series against Pakistan. In January 2002, she recorded bowling figures of 5 wickets for 2 runs in a match against Pakistan; these are the best bowling figures for a Sri Lankan bowler in Women's ODIs.

== Canada career ==
Sivanantham moved to Canada in 2008, and her first recorded match for Canada was in July 2010 against the United States. Sivanantham took 1/46 from 10 overs. A few days later, Sivanantham captained the team in a Twenty20 match against the United States, making 31*. She also captained the team in the 2012 Americas T20 Championship in the Cayman Islands, a pre-qualifying tournament for the 2014 ICC Women's World Twenty20. Canada qualified for the 2013 World T20 Qualifier tournament; in the first match, they were bowled out for 44, with Sivanantham top scorer with 13. Canada won their final group game against Japan, with Sivanantham scoring 32 from 41 balls.
