= Wickramasinghe Archchilage Chandrawathi =

Sri Lankan cricketer (born 1981)

Wickramasinghe Chandrawathi
Personal information
- Full name: Wickramasinghe Archchilage Chandrawathi
- Born: 27 May 1981 (age 45)

International information
- National side: Sri Lanka

Career statistics
Competition	WODI
Matches	5
Runs scored	32
Batting average	8.00
100s/50s	0/0
Top score	10
Balls bowled	81
Wickets	2
Bowling average	31.00
5 wickets in innings	0
10 wickets in match	0
Best bowling	1/19
Catches/stumpings	0/0
- Source: Cricinfo, 12 December 2017

Wickramasinghe Archchilage Chandrawathi, known as WA Chandrawathi, (born 27 May 1981) is a former Sri Lankan cricketer. She has played for Sri Lanka in five women's One Day Internationals.
