= Sumudu Fernando =

Sri Lankan cricketer (born 1981)

Personal information
- Full name: Warnakula Jayasuriya Gunawardene Sellaperumage Sumudu Isari Fernando
- Born: 8 February 1981 (age 45); Colombo, Sri Lanka

International information
- National side: Sri Lanka

Career statistics
Competition	WODI
Matches	3
Runs scored	5
Batting average	2.50
100s/50s	0/0
Top score	5
Balls bowled	42
Wickets	0
Bowling average	–
5 wickets in innings	–
10 wickets in match	–
Best bowling	–
Catches/stumpings	0/–
- Source: Cricinfo, 12 December 2017

Warnakula Jayasuriya Gunawardene Sellaperumage Sumudu Isari Fernando (born 8 February 1981) is a Sri Lankan cricketer. She has played for Sri Lanka in three women's ODIs. She was a member of the Sri Lankan team during the 2009 ICC Women's World Twenty20.
