= Kandy Cricket Club =

- One Day name: Kandy Cricket Club

Personnel
- Captain: (Sri Lanka)
- Coach: (Sri Lanka)

History
- Premier Trophy wins: none
- Premier Limited Overs Tournament wins: none
- Inter-Provincial Twenty20#Twenty20 Tournament wins: none

The Kandy Cricket Club, also known as Kandy CC, is a cricket club based in Kandy, Sri Lanka which plays in divisional cricket tournaments organized by the Kandy District Cricket Association (KDCA) and Sri Lanka Cricket.

== History ==
Cricket has been played in Kandy since 1863. The first club to play was Kandy Dancing, Boating & Rowing Club. In 1896 it became the Kandy SC. Ceylon's first unofficial test was played at Bogambara Grounds in 1889. In 1946, the Kandy District Cricket Association and there after the Central Province Cricket Association was formed. During the 1970s Kandy SC was unable to complete their quota of matches and were suspended which led to some of their keen cricketers forming the Kandy CC.

== Honours ==
- Premier Trophy (0) -

== Notable people ==
- Pradeep Munidasa, 2002–03 season cricketer
- N. Rambadagalla, 1992–93 season cricketer

== Bibliography ==
- Wisden Cricketers Almanack (annual)
