= Vasanthi Ratnayake =

Sri Lankan cricketer

Personal information
- Full name: Liyanage Don Vasanthi Ratnayake
- Born: 30 November 1973 (age 52); Wellawatte, Colombo, Sri Lanka
- Batting: Right-handed
- Bowling: Right-arm medium
- Role: Batter

International information
- National side: Sri Lanka (1997–2003)
- Only Test (cap 8): 17 April 1998 v Pakistan
- ODI debut (cap 8): 25 November 1997 v Netherlands
- Last ODI: 23 March 2003 v West Indies

Career statistics
Competition	WTest	WODI	WLA
Matches	1	22	27
Runs scored	18	558	692
Batting average	9.00	26.57	26.61
100s/50s	0/0	0/3	0/4
Top score	13	88	88
Balls bowled	–	90	204
Wickets	–	0	0
Bowling average	–	–	–
5 wickets in innings	–	0	0
10 wickets in match	–	0	0
Best bowling	–	–	–
Catches/stumpings	0/–	4/–	5/–
- Source: CricketArchive, 7 December 2021

Liyanage Don Vasanthi Ratnayake (born 30 November 1973) is a Sri Lankan former cricketer who played primarily as a right-handed batter. She appeared in one Test match and 22 One Day Internationals for Sri Lanka between 1997 and 2003.

Ratnayake made her international debut in 1997, in an ODI between Sri Lanka and the Netherlands, in Colombo. Opening the batting in that match, she scored just one run. She made her only Test match appearance in 1998, playing against Pakistan, scoring five and thirteen in the two innings. She scored an international half-century for the first time in 2002, also against Pakistan, when she scored 88. This remained her highest score in international cricket, and remained the highest individual score in WODIs by any Sri Lankan player other than Chamari Athapaththu until the team's tour of Ireland in 2024, in which Vishmi Gunaratne and Harshitha Samarawickrama both scored centuries. She scored two further half-centuries; 51 later in that same series against Pakistan, and 67 not out on her final appearance in international cricket, against the West Indies in 2003. In total, Ratnayake played 22 ODIs, scoring 558 runs at an average of 26.57. In her only Test appearance, she scored 18 runs at an average of 9.00. She bowled 90 balls in ODI cricket, but did not take a wicket.
