= Lalana Priyadarshani =

Sri Lankan cricketer (born 1980)

Personal information
- Full name: Lalana Bulathshenal Araggelage Priyadarshani
- Born: 1 September 1980 (age 46)
- Batting: Right-handed
- Bowling: Right-arm fast-medium

International information
- National side: Sri Lanka

Career statistics
Competition	WODI
Matches	1
Runs scored	–
Batting average	–
100s/50s	–
Top score	–
Balls bowled	42
Wickets	0
Bowling average	–
5 wickets in innings	–
10 wickets in match	–
Best bowling	–
Catches/stumpings	0/–
- Source: Cricinfo, 11 December 2017

Lalana Bulathshenal Araggelage Priyadarshani (born 1 September 1980) is a Sri Lankan former cricketer. She has played for Sri Lanka in a solitary Women's ODI.
