= Randika Galhenage =

Sri Lankan cricketer

Personal information
- Full name: Galhenage Randika Chandimali Samanthi
- Born: 14 August 1978 (age 48); Colombo, Sri Lanka
- Batting: Right handed
- Role: Wicket-keeper

International information
- National side: Sri Lanka
- ODI debut (cap 25): 23 January 2002 v Pakistan
- Last ODI: 18 December 2006 v India

Domestic team information
- Years: Team
- 2000–2003 2012: Colts Cricket Club

Career statistics
Competition	WODI	List A
Matches	15	20
Runs scored	117	150
Batting average	9.00	9.37
100s/50s	0/0	0/0
Top score	34	34
Catches/stumpings	2/–	5/2
- Source: CricketArchive, 6 January 2017

Galhenage Randika Chandimali Samanthi (born 14 August 1978), known as Randika Galhenage is a former cricketer who represented Sri Lanka.

A wicket-keeper, Samanthi played in 15 women's One Day Internationals between 2002 and 2006.
