= Indika Kankanange =

Sir Lankan cricketer (born 1974)

Personal information
- Full name: Kanattakankanamlage Jayamali Indika Kankanange
- Born: September 25, 1974 (age 52); Mahamodara, Sri Lanka

International information
- National side: Sri Lanka

Domestic team information
- Years: Team
- Colts Cricket Club

Career statistics
Competition	WODI
Matches	17
Runs scored	205
Batting average	14.64
100s/50s	0/1
Top score	58
Balls bowled	490
Wickets	9
Bowling average	27.55
5 wickets in innings	0
10 wickets in match	0
Best bowling	3/14
Catches/stumpings	4/–
- Source: Cricinfo, 12 December 2017

Kanattakankanamlage Jayamali Indika Kankanange (born 25 September 1974) is a former Sri Lankan cricketer. She was a member of the Sri Lankan cricket team at the 2000 Women's Cricket World Cup
