= Chamani Seneviratne =

Sri Lankan cricketer (born 1978)

Personal information
- Full name: Chamani Roshini Seneviratne
- Born: 14 November 1978 (age 47); Anuradhapura, Sri Lanka
- Batting: Right-handed
- Bowling: Right-arm medium
- Role: All-rounder

International information
- National sides: Sri Lanka (1997–2013); United Arab Emirates (2018–2022)
- Only Test (cap 9): 17 April 1998; Sri Lanka v Pakistan
- ODI debut (cap 9): 25 November 1997; Sri Lanka v Netherlands
- Last ODI: 17 February 2009; Sri Lanka v Pakistan
- T20I debut (cap 15/10): 21 April 2010; Sri Lanka v West Indies
- Last T20I: 29 April 2022; UAE v Hong Kong

Domestic team information
- Years: Team
- 2007–2008/09: Slimline Sports Club
- 2009/10–2010/11: Colts Cricket Club
- 2012/13–2014: Sri Lanka Air Force Sports Club

Career statistics
Competition	WTest	WODI	WT20I	WLA
Matches	1	80	55	136
Runs scored	148	832	493	1,688
Batting average	148.00	14.85	13.32	20.83
100s/50s	1/0	0/1	0/2	1/6
Top score	105*	56	63	105*
Balls bowled	209	3,289	977	5,352
Wickets	7	72	56	143
Bowling average	8.42	26.08	13.75	18.26
5 wickets in innings	1	0	1	1
10 wickets in match	0	0	0	0
Best bowling	5/31	4/23	5/3	5/15
Catches/stumpings	0/–	27/–	17/–	40/–
- Source: CricketArchive, 12 November 2022

Chamani Roshini Seneviratne (born 14 November 1978) is a Sri Lankan-born cricketer who currently plays for the United Arab Emirates as a right-arm medium bowler and right-handed batter. She has the distinction of representing two nations in international cricket, having previously played internationally for Sri Lanka between 1997 and 2013, appearing in one Test match, 80 One Day Internationals and 32 Twenty20 Internationals.

She scored Sri Lanka's only century in women's Test cricket, with 105* against Pakistan in April 1998. She also became the eighth batter to score a Test hundred on debut, and achieved the record for the highest score made by a woman when batting at number 8 or lower in women's Tests. Her 148 runs overall on debut was also the fifth-highest by a woman on Test debut. She retired from Sri Lankan cricket in January 2014, with immediate effect after refusing to attend a practice session in December 2013.

In May 2018, she was named in the United Arab Emirates squad for the 2018 ICC Women's World Twenty20 Qualifier tournament. She made her Women's Twenty20 International (WT20I) debut for the UAE against the Netherlands in the World Twenty20 Qualifier on 7 July 2018.

On 19 February 2019, in the 2019 ICC Women's Qualifier Asia match against Kuwait, she took her first five-wicket haul in WT20Is. In June 2020, Seneviratne was stranded in the UAE, after losing her coaching job in Abu Dhabi due to the COVID-19 pandemic.
