= Thanuga Ekanayake =

Sri Lankan cricketer (born 1972)

Personal information
- Full name: Ekanayake Mudiyanselage Thanuga Priyadarshani Ekanayake
- Born: 24 February 1972 (age 54); Colombo, Sri Lanka
- Batting: Right-handed
- Role: Wicket-keeper

International information
- National side: Sri Lanka (1997–2005)
- Only Test (cap 2): 17 April 1998 v Pakistan
- ODI debut (cap 2): 25 November 1997 v Netherlands
- Last ODI: 1 April 2005 v South Africa

Domestic team information
- Years: Team
- 2000–2003: Slimline Sports Club

Career statistics
Competition	WTest	WODI	WLA
Matches	1	43	48
Runs scored	–	83	110
Batting average	–	5.53	6.47
100s/50s	–	0/0	0/0
Top score	–	13	14*
Balls bowled	–	–	42
Wickets	–	–	0
Bowling average	–	–	–
5 wickets in innings	–	–	0
10 wickets in match	–	–	0
Best bowling	–	–	–
Catches/stumpings	2/0	22/17	24/19
- Source: CricketArchive, 10 December 2021

Ekanayake Mudiyanselage Thanuga Priyadarshani Ekanayake (born 24 February 1972) is a Sri Lankan former cricketer who played as a wicket-keeper and right-handed batter for the national side. She appeared in one Test match and 43 One Day Internationals for Sri Lanka between 1997 and 2005. She played domestic cricket for Slimline Sports Club.
