= Thalika Gunaratne =

Sri Lankan cricketer (born 1975)

Personal information
- Full name: BA Thalika Nilimi Gunaratne
- Born: 9 March 1975 (age 51); Anuradhapura, Sri Lanka
- Batting: Right-handed
- Bowling: Slow left-arm orthodox
- Relatives: Dedunu Gunaratne (sister)

International information
- National side: Sri Lanka
- ODI debut (cap 4): 25 November 1997 v Netherlands
- Last ODI: 25 March 2005 v England
- Source: ESPNcricinfo, 15 May 2020

Thalika Gunaratne (born 9 March 1975) is a Sri Lankan former cricketer. She played 13 Women's One Day International (WODI) matches for Sri Lanka women's national cricket team.

Gunaratne made her WODI debut against the Netherlands on 25 November 1997. She was part of Sri Lanka's squad for the 2005 Women's Cricket World Cup. She played her last WODI against England, in March 2005.
