= Dona Indralatha =

Sri Lankan cricketer (born 1973)

Personal information
- Full name: Appukutti Arachchige Dona Indralatha
- Born: 27 August 1973 (age 53); Colombo
- Batting: Right-handed
- Bowling: Right-arm medium-fast
- Role: Allrounder

International information
- National side: Sri Lanka

Domestic team information
- Years: Team
- 2001–2003: Colts Cricket Club women's
- 2000: Colombo Young Women Cricket Club
- Source: Cricinfo, May 11, 2014

Appukutti Arachchige Dona Indralatha (born August 27, 1973, in Colombo, Sri Lanka) is a Sri Lankan former cricketer. She was a right-handed batsman as well as right-arm medium-fast bowler.
