= Gayathri Kariyawasam =

Sri Lankan cricketer (born 1976)

Personal information
- Full name: Gayathri Lanka Kariyawasam
- Born: 25 December 1976 (age 49); Colombo, Sri Lanka
- Batting: Right-handed
- Bowling: Right arm fast

International information
- National side: Sri Lanka

Domestic team information
- Years: Team
- Colts Cricket Club
- Slimline Sports Club

Career statistics
Competition	WODI
Matches	17
Runs scored	6
Batting average	2.00
100s/50s	0/0
Top score	3
Balls bowled	534
Wickets	12
Bowling average	24.00
5 wickets in innings	0
10 wickets in match	0
Best bowling	3/26
Catches/stumpings	5/0
- Source: Cricinfo, 14 December 2017

Gayathri Kariyawasam (born 25 December 1976) is a former Sri Lankan women's cricketer. She was part of the Sri Lankan cricket team that played the 2009 Women's Cricket World Cup.
