= Sandamali Dolawatte =

Sri Lankan cricketer (born 1983)

Personal information
- Full name: Sandamali Kumuduni Dolawatte
- Born: 10 February 1983 (age 43); Colombo, Sri Lanka
- Bowling: Legbreak

Career statistics
Competition	WODI	WT20I
Matches	53	24
Runs scored	431	97
Batting average	12.31	6.46
100s/50s	0/1	0/0
Top score	74	17*
Balls bowled	870	133
Wickets	25	5
Bowling average	23.36	26.20
5 wickets in innings	1	0
10 wickets in match	–	–
Best bowling	5/16	3/0
Catches/stumpings	13/0	2/0

Sadamali Kumuduni Dolawatte (born 10 February 1983, Colombo) is a Sri Lankan cricketer who has captained the Sri Lankan women's team in eight one-day internationals, six of them at the 2005 Women's Cricket World Cup. She has batted in positions from opening to number 10, but her highest score in women's ODI cricket is still the 10 she managed against England in 2005–06. She regularly used to bowl leg breaks before captaining the side, but in her eight matches as captain she has not bowled more than five overs in any game.
