= Women's Test cricket =

Longest form of cricket

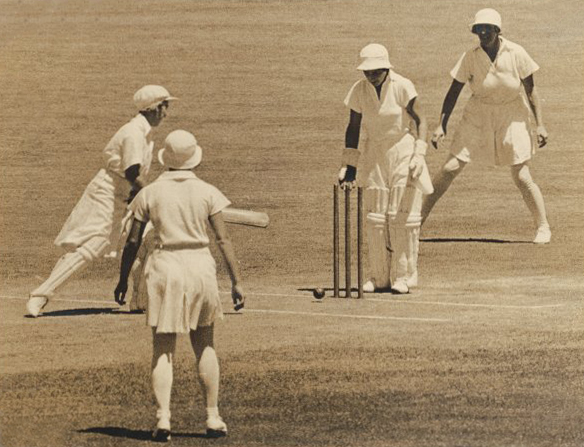
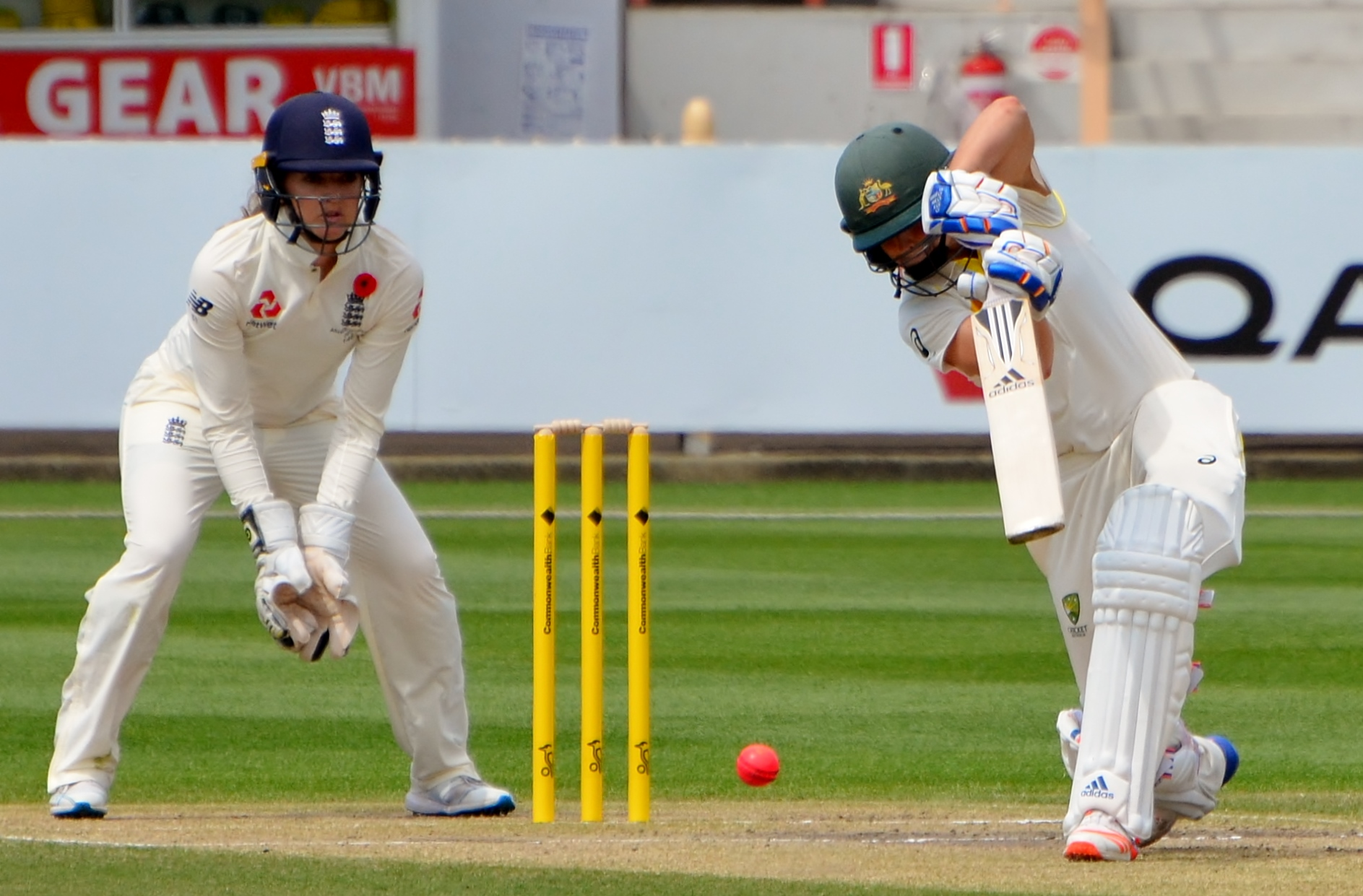
- The first women's Test match was played between England and Australia in 1934–35 England's Sarah Taylor (left) and Australia's Ellyse Perry (right) during the Women's Ashes Test match played in 2017–18
- Highest governing body: International Cricket Council
- First played: 28 December 1934

Characteristics
- Team members: Full members
- Mixed-sex: No
- Type: Outdoor Game
- Equipment: Ball, Bat, Stumps, Cricket Helmet, Thigh Guard, Batting Pads, Abdominal Guard, Gloves, etc
- Venue: Cricket Stadium

Presence
- Country or region: Worldwide

Women's Test cricket is the longest format of women's cricket and is the female equivalent to men's Test cricket. Matches comprise four-innings and are held over a maximum of four days between two of the leading cricketing nations. The rules governing the format differ little from those for the men's game, with differences generally being technicalities surrounding umpiring and field size.

The first women's Test match was played by England women and Australia women in December 1934, a three-day contest held in Brisbane which England won by nine wickets. A total of 153 Women's Test matches have been played. Far fewer matches are played each year in favour of Women's One Day Internationals and Women's Twenty20 Internationals, with the international calendar revolving around the shorter formats of the game.

== Playing conditions ==
Women's Test cricket is subject to the Laws of cricket, with a number of variations and refinements, which are set out in the ICC's "Women's Test match playing conditions" document. For the most part, these playing conditions are very similar to those set out for men's Test cricket. Matches are played between two teams of eleven players, across up to four innings. Test cricket can have three results: a draw, a tie, or one team wins.

The primary, and most noticeable, difference from the men's game is that women's Test matches are typically played over four days, rather than five. However, the players are expected to fit more overs in per hour in the women's game than the men's: 17 as opposed to 15, and so a full day's play in a women's Test match should include 100 overs, rather than 90. The cricket field has smaller dimensions; the boundaries must be between 55 and 70 yards (50.29 and 64.01 m), in contrast to the 65 to 90 yards (59.44 to 82.30 m) required in men's Tests. As well as playing on a smaller field, the women use a smaller and lighter ball than their male counterparts; the Laws of cricket dictate that women should use a ball that is between 4 15/16 and 5 5/16 ounces (139.98 and 150.61 grams); which could be up to 13/16 ounces (23.03 grams) lighter than the ball used by the men. The Decision Review System (UDRS) is now available in women's Test matches, also umpires are permitted to ask the third umpire to check television replays in certain cases.

As women's tests are often played over four days, the minimum lead to impose a follow-on is 150 runs, as opposed to a 200 run lead when played over five days. This is consistent with four/five day men's test matches.

== Nations ==
In all, ten national women's teams have competed in Test cricket. The England team's tour of Australia and New Zealand in the 1934–35 season established the first three sides, and it is those three teams that have competed in Test cricket most frequently; each having played at least 45 matches. South Africa were the next side to play the format, contesting their first match in 1960. However, due to their exclusion from international sport due to the nation's apartheid policy, they have only played in thirteen Test matches, fewer than India. Four sides — Pakistan, Ireland, the Netherlands and Sri Lanka — have competed in fewer than five Test matches.

The nations with men's and women's test teams do not entirely overlap. Of full members with men's test teams, Afghanistan, Bangladesh and Zimbabwe do not have women's test teams. Netherlands, while not a test team in the men's game, are a test playing nation in the women's game. Ireland, while having both men's and women's test teams, unusually played a women's test match, their only one to date, seventeen years before their first men's test match - on both test debuts, the opponent was Pakistan. The eight other full members, including Pakistan, have played men's, and then women's, test cricket.

The teams with Test status (with the date of each team's Test debut) are:

1. Australia (28 December 1934)
2. England (28 December 1934)
3. New Zealand (16 February 1935)
4. South Africa (2 December 1960)
5. West Indies (7 May 1976)
6. India (31 October 1976)
7. Pakistan (17 April 1998)
8. Sri Lanka (17 April 1998)
9. Ireland (30 July 2000)
10. Netherlands (28 July 2007)

== Recent developments ==
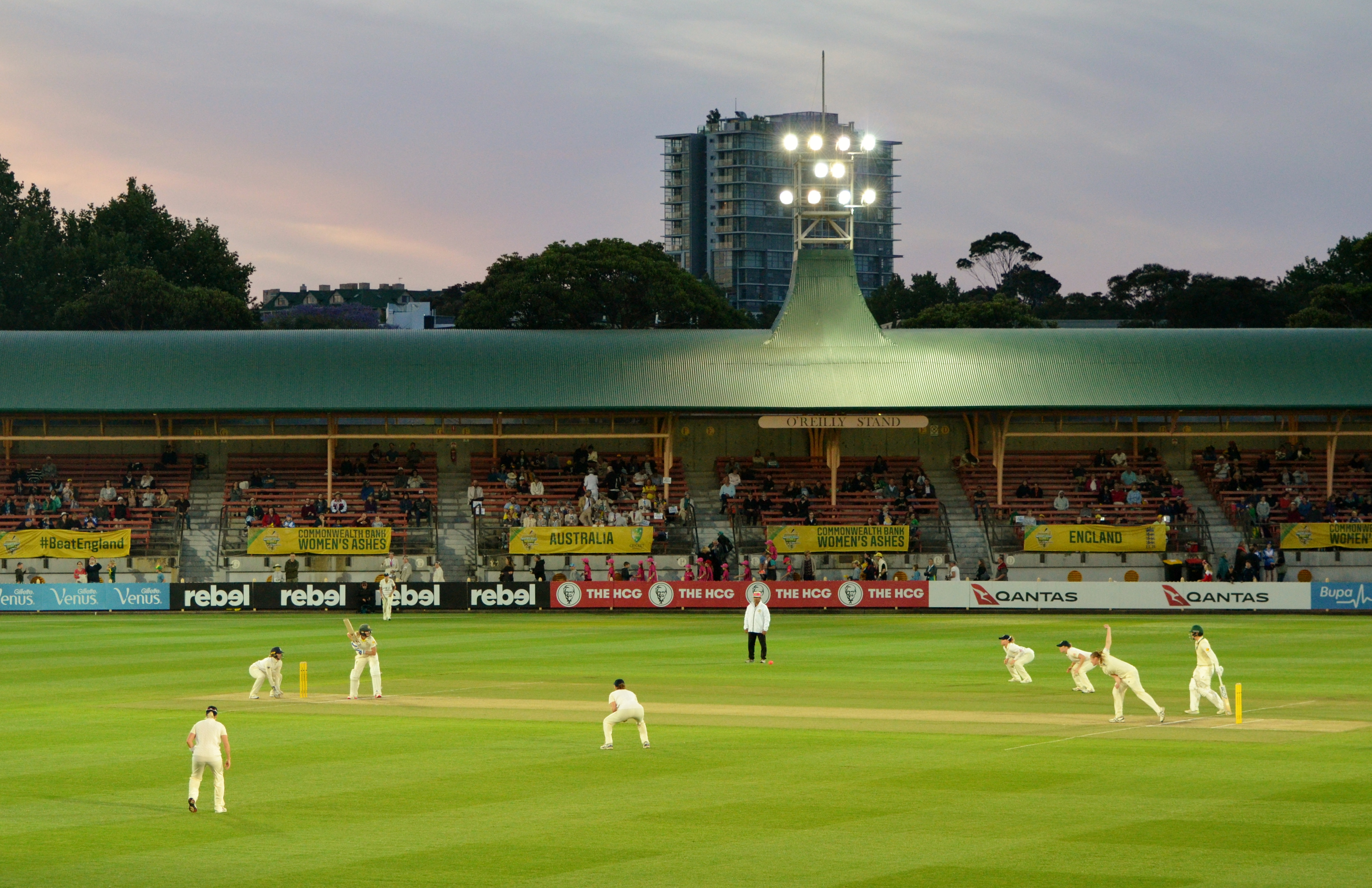
The first-ever women's day/night Test was played at North Sydney Oval in 2017.

As of April 2019, there had only been one Women's Test match in the previous three years, and only two teams other than England and Australia had played in a Women's Test in the previous ten years. Australia's captain, Meg Lanning, expressed her interest in more Women's Test matches being played. In July 2019, following the conclusion of the one-off Women's Ashes Test in England, the question was raised about whether Women's Test matches should be played across five days, instead of four. The match had two sessions washed out and finished in a draw.

In December 2019, New Zealand's Sophie Devine requested that administrators arrange a Women's Test match between New Zealand and Australia, following a strong performance in the Women's Big Bash League. New Zealand's women last played in a Test match in 2004, and their last encounter against Australia in the format was in 1996. In June 2020, during an ICC webinar, Devine and India's Jemimah Rodrigues both supported the idea of a multi-format series for women's cricket.

In April 2021, the ICC awarded permanent Test and One Day International (ODI) status to all full member women's teams.

On International Women's Day 2021, it was announced that India and England would play a one-off Test later in the year. The Test was played at Bristol County Ground, between 16 and 19 June 2021. Additionally, the Board of Control for Cricket in India was said to be in talks with Cricket Australia about a possible Test match between India and Australia.

Between 2000 and June 2021, only thirty women's Test matches were played, with fourteen of those being Ashes Tests between Australia and England.

On 20 May 2021, Cricket Australia confirmed that an Australia versus India Test match would be played at the WACA Ground, Perth, between 30 September and 3 October 2021. Due to COVID-19 lockdowns and restrictions, the match was later moved to Metricon Stadium on the Gold Coast in Queensland. Another Test match, between Australia and England, was played at Manuka Oval, Canberra, between 27 and 30 January 2022, as part of the 2021–22 Women's Ashes series. Both of these matches ended in a draw.

In an interview on the BBC Test Match Special radio programme during the 1st Test of the New Zealand men's tour of England in early June 2022, Greg Barclay, Chair of the International Cricket Council (ICC), asserted that women's Test cricket will not be "part of the landscape moving forward to any real extent". The assertion generated significant controversy, and also calls from former women's Test cricketers and others for the ICC to return control of the women's game to women's cricket associations.

At the end of June 2022, England and South Africa played their first women's Test match against each other since 2003. The match was South Africa's first women's Test since November 2014. It was played at the County Ground, Taunton, England, and was the first stage of a multi-format South African tour of England.

Women's Test cricket teams
Team	First	Latest	Matches	Won	Lost	Drawn
Australia	1934	2026	81	24	11	46
England	1934	2026	103	21	18	64
India	1976	2026	43	9	6	27
Ireland	2000	2000	1	1	0	0
Netherlands	2007	2007	1	0	1	0
New Zealand	1935	2004	45	2	10	33
Pakistan	1998	2004	3	0	2	1
South Africa	1960	2024	16	1	8	7
Sri Lanka	1998	1998	1	1	0	0
West Indies	1976	2004	12	1	3	8

== Records ==
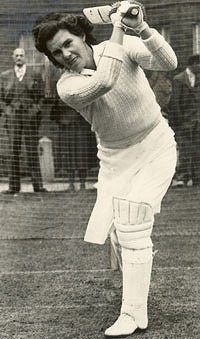
Betty Wilson was the first player (man or woman) to take 10 wickets and score a century in the same Test, including the first Women's Test hat-trick.

Due to the infrequent playing of women's Test cricket outside of Australia, England and New Zealand, cumulative records, such as the most runs during a career, are dominated by players from those three nations. England's Jan Brittin has scored the most runs during her career, totalling 1,935 during her 27 matches, and 18 of the top twenty players come from either Australia, England or New Zealand. The Australian batsman Denise Annetts, who is 15th on that list, has the highest batting average, 81.90, from her ten matches. Annetts was also involved in the largest partnership in women's Test cricket, sharing a stand of 309 runs with Lindsay Reeler in 1987. Ten women have scored double centuries in Test cricket; the highest of these was the 242 runs scored by Pakistan's Kiran Baluch against the West Indies in 2004.

Mary Duggan, who played for England between 1949 and 1963 is the leading wicket-taker in women's Test cricket, claiming 77 wickets from 17 matches. The next most prolific bowler is Australia's Betty Wilson, who claimed her 68 wickets at the lowest bowling average, 11.80 and the first hat-trick in Women's Test cricket. Both of the players with the best bowling figures, in an innings and in a match, are from the Indian subcontinent; India's Neetu David holds the record for the best figures in an innings, having taken eight second innings wickets against England in 1995, while Pakistan's Shaiza Khan took thirteen wickets in a match against the West Indies in 2004.

Amongst wicket-keepers, Christina Matthews has taken the most dismissals in her career, accumulating 46 catches and 12 stumpings during her 20 matches for Australia. Lisa Nye holds the record for the most dismissals in a single innings, having been responsible for eight of the ten wickets for England against New Zealand in 1992. Only two players have achieved the all-rounders double of scoring a century and taking ten wickets in the same match; Betty Wilson did it against England in 1958, while Enid Bakewell managed it for England against the West Indies in 1979. Wilson's performance was the first time such a feat had been achieved in Men's or Women's Tests and also included the first hat-trick in Women's Tests.

== See also ==
- List of women's Test cricket grounds
- The Women's Ashes
- Women's One Day International cricket
- Women's Twenty20 International
