= List of sports venues named after individuals =

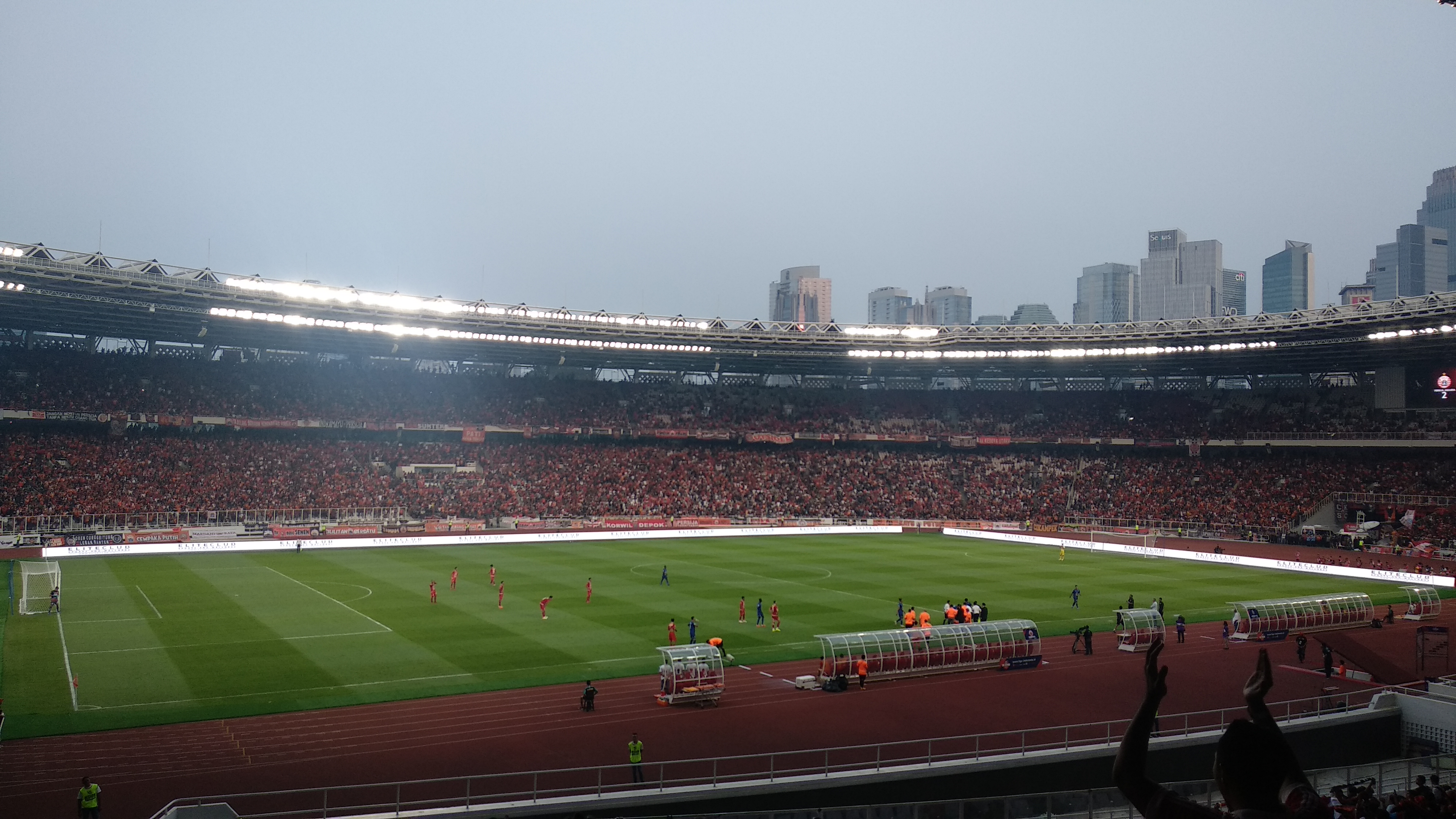
Stadion Utama Gelora Bung Karno in Indonesia.

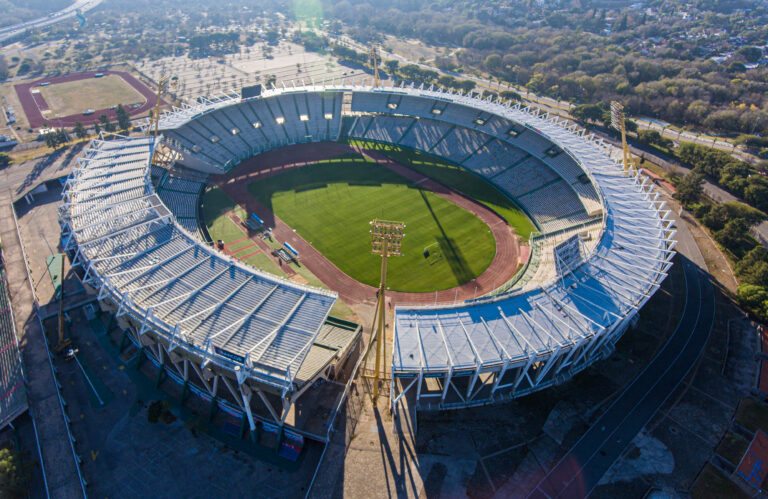
The Estadio Mario Alberto Kempes in Argentina.

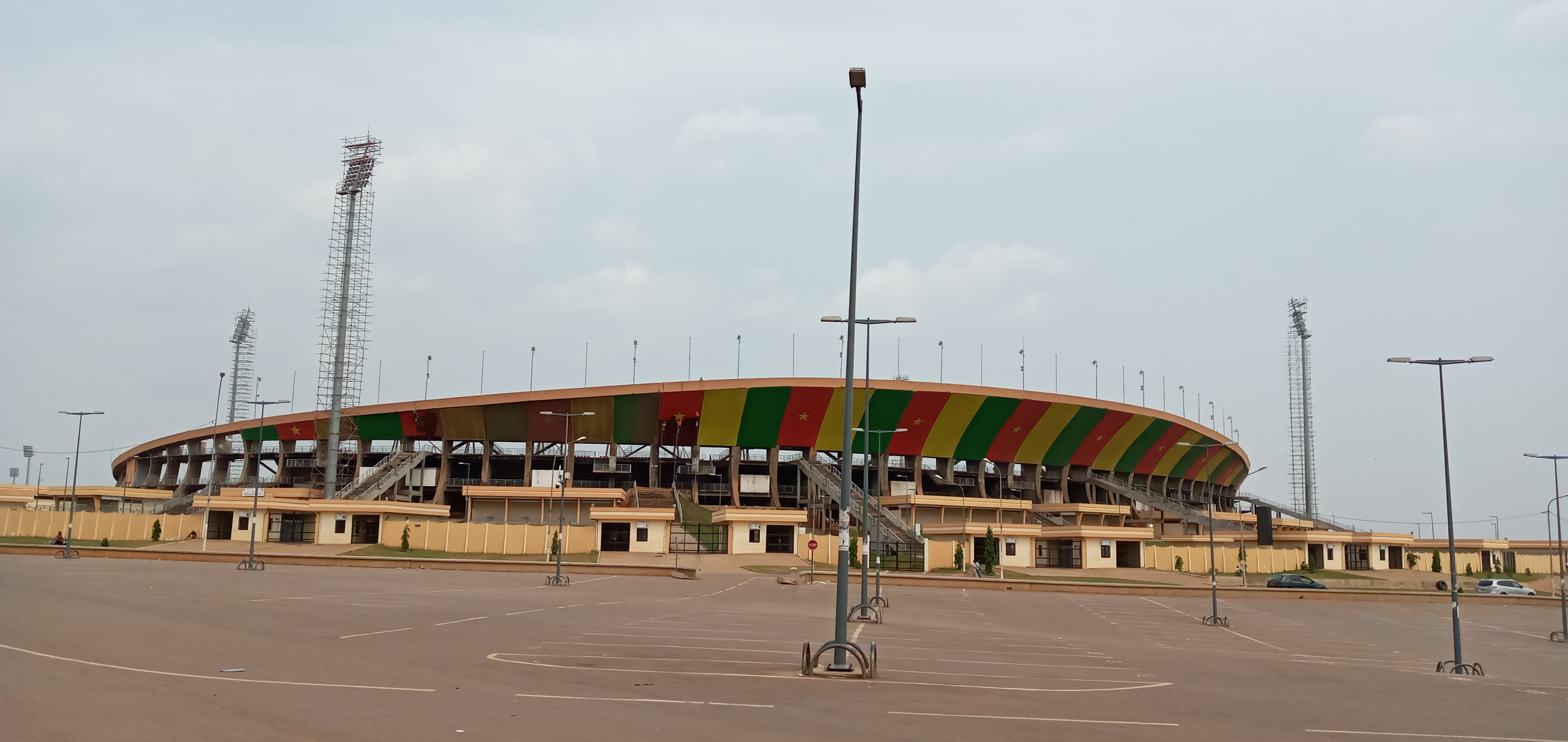
The Stade Ahmadou Ahidjo in Cameroon.

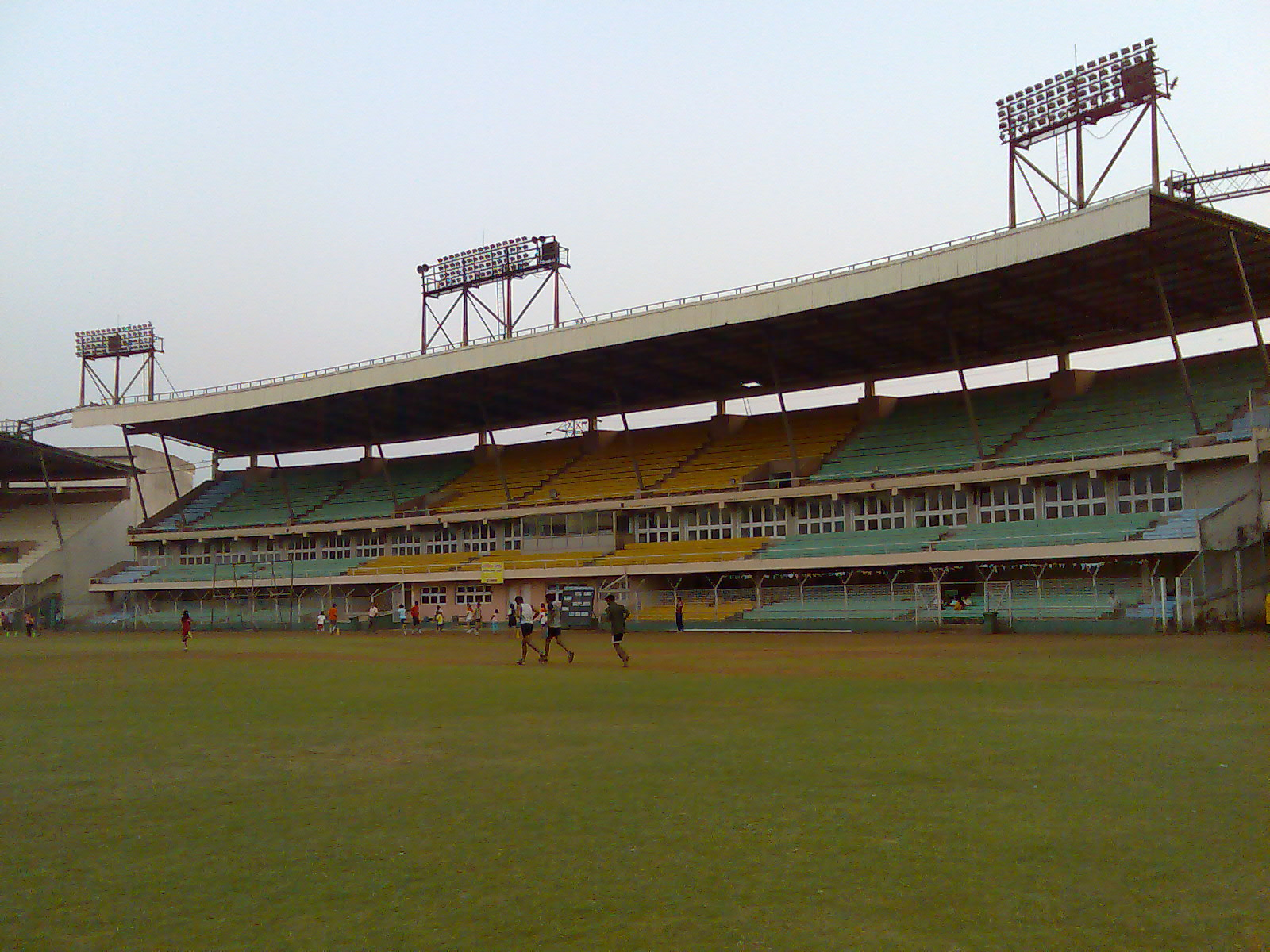
The Dadoji Konddev Stadium in India.

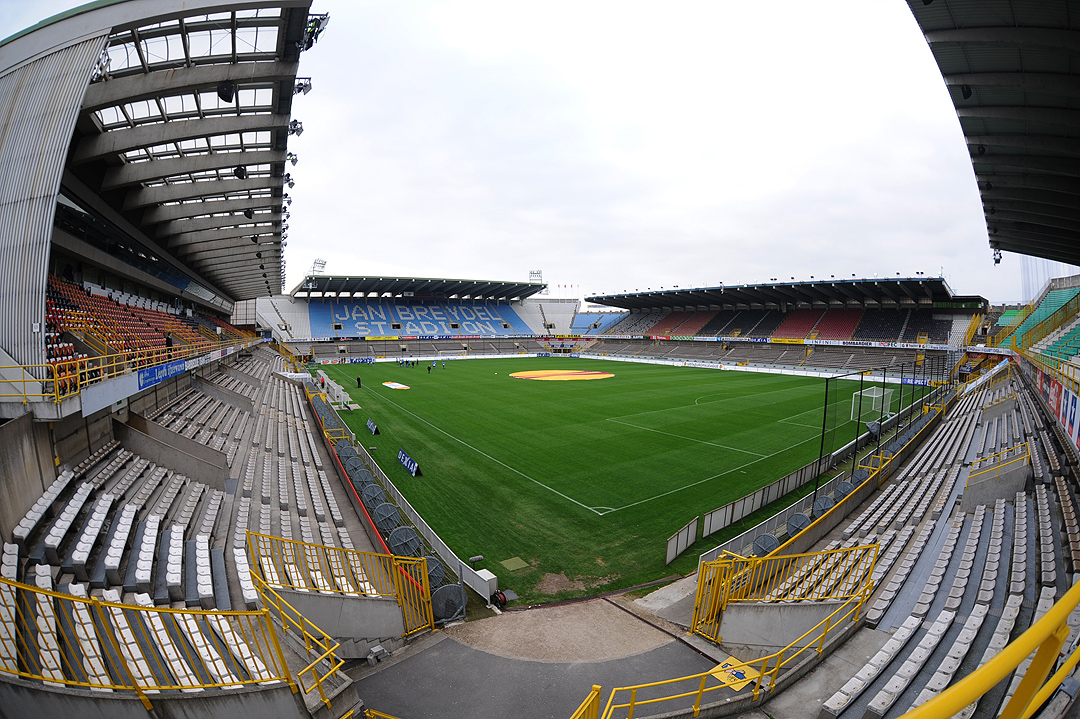
The Jan Breydelstadion in Belgium.

The following is a list of sports venues named after individuals:

== Albania ==
- Qemal Stafa Stadium in Tirana
- Loro Boriçi Stadium in Shkodër
- Ruzhdi Bizhuta Stadium in Elbasan
- Selman Stërmasi Stadium in Tirana
- Niko Dovana Stadium in Durrës
- Roza Haxhiu Stadium in Lushnjë
- Adush Muça Stadium in Ballsh
- Loni Papuçiu Stadium in Fier

== Algeria ==
- Stade Ahmed Kaïd in Tiaret

== Antigua ==
- Stanford Cricket Ground in St. John's
- Sir Vivian Richards Stadium in North Sound

== Argentina ==
Alphabetized by family name of the stadium's namesake.

- José Amalfitani Stadium in Buenos Aires
- Estadio Alberto J. Armando (aka La Bombonera) in Buenos Aires
- Estadio Marcelo Bielsa in Rosario
- Estadio Raúl Conti in Puerto Madryn
- Estadio Monumental José Fierro in Tucumán
- Autódromo Juan y Oscar Gálvez in Buenos Aires
- Estadio Mario Alberto Kempes in Córdoba
- Estadio Monumental Antonio V. Liberti (aka El Monumental) in Buenos Aires
- Estadio Brigadier General Estanislao López in Santa Fe
- Estadio Diego Armando Maradona in Buenos Aires
- Estadio Padre Ernesto Martearena in Salta
- Estadio José María Minella in Mar del Plata

== Aruba ==
- Trinidad Stadium in Oranjestad

== Austria ==
- Arnold Schwarzenegger-Stadion, Graz – has since been renamed
- Ernst-Happel-Stadion in Vienna

== Australia ==
- Allan Border Field in Albion
- Andy Caldecott Park in Keith
- Bill Lawry Oval
- Andrew "Boy" Charlton Pool
- Bradman Oval in Bowral
- Doone Kennedy Hobart Aquatic Centre
- Dawn Fraser Swimming Pool
- Cazalys Stadium in Cairns
- Eric Weissel Oval
- Gillon Oval in Melbourne
- Harold Holt Memorial Swimming Centre
- Ian Thorpe Aquatic Centre
- John Cain Arena
- John Grant International Raceway in Moorebank, New South Wales
- Queen Elizabeth Oval in Bendigo – named after Queen Elizabeth II
- Pat Rafter Arena in Brisbane
- Rod Laver Arena in Melbourne
- Margaret Court Arena in Melbourne – named after Margaret Court
- Lathlain Park was indirectly named for Sir William Lathlain, the Lord Mayor of Perth from 1918 to 1923. The ground was named after the suburb of Lathlain, which was named after the Lord Mayor.
- Roy Henzell Oval in Caloundra
- Tony Ireland Stadium in Townsville

== Azerbaijan ==
- Anatoliy Banishevskiy Stadium in Masally
- Heydar Aliyev Stadium in Imishli
- Ismat Gayibov Stadium in Bakikhanov
- Nariman Narimanov Stadium in Neftchala
- Tofiq Bahramov Stadium in Baku
- Yashar Mammadzade Stadium in Mingachevir

== Bahamas ==
- Thomas Robinson Stadium in Nassau
- Roscow A. L. Davies Soccer Field in Nassau

== Belgium ==
- Stade Charles Tondreau in Mons
- Constant Vanden Stock Stadium in Anderlecht, Brussels
- Edmond Machtens Stadium in Molenbeek-Saint-Jean
- Jan Breydel Stadium in Brugge
- Stade Joseph Marien in Brussels
- King Baudouin Stadium in Brussels
- Stade Maurice Dufrasne in Liège

== Belize ==
- Marion Jones Sports Complex in Belize City

== Benin ==
- Stade Charles de Gaulle in Porto-Novo

== Bolivia ==
- Estadio Hernando Siles in La Paz

== Bosnia and Herzegovina ==
- Asim Ferhatović Hase Stadium in Sarajevo

== Brazil ==
- Estádio Eduardo José Farah in São Paulo
- Estádio Mané Garrincha in Brasília
- Estádio Olímpico Nilton Santos in Rio de Janeiro – formerly Estádio Olímpico João Havelange
- Estádio Rei Pelé in Maceió
- Emerson Fittipaldi Speedway in Rio de Janeiro
- Autódromo José Carlos Pace in São Paulo
- Autódromo Internacional Nelson Piquet in Rio de Janeiro
- Autódromo Internacional Nelson Piquet in Brasília
- Autódromo Internacional Ayrton Senna in Caruaru
- Autódromo Internacional Ayrton Senna in Goiânia
- Autódromo Internacional Ayrton Senna in Londrina
- Mini Autodromo Zeca Elias in Americana City

== Brunei ==
- Sultan Hassanal Bolkiah Stadium in Bandar Seri Begawan

== Bulgaria ==
- Georgi Asparuhov Stadium in Sofia
- Vasil Levski National Stadium in Sofia

== Burundi ==
- Prince Louis Rwagasore Stadium in Bujumbura

== Cameroon ==
- Ahmadou Ahidjo Stadium in Yaoundé

== Canada ==
- Aréna Dave Keon in Rouyn-Noranda, Quebec
- Art Hauser Centre in Prince Albert, Saskatchewan
- Bill Copeland Sports Centre in Burnaby, British Columbia
- Arena Bill Durnan in Montreal, Quebec
- Centre Georges Vézina in Chicoutimi, Quebec
- Charles V. Keating Millennium Centre in Antigonish, Nova Scotia
- Dave Andreychuk Mountain Arena & Skating Centre in Hamilton, Ontario
- Arena Doug Harvey in Montreal, Quebec
- Father David Bauer Olympic Arena in Calgary, Alberta
- Frank Crane Arena in Nanaimo, British Columbia
- Circuit Gilles Villeneuve in Montreal, Quebec
- Grant Fuhr Arena in Spruce Grove, Alberta
- Centre Henry-Leonard in Baie-Comeau, Quebec
- Arena Howie Morentz in Montreal, Quebec
- Jack Gatecliff Arena in St. Catharines, Ontario
- Aréna Jacques Plante in Shawinigan, Quebec
- Colisée Jean Béliveau in Longueuil, Quebec
- Aréna Leonard Grondin in Granby, Quebec
- Aréna Marcel-Bédard in Beauport, Quebec
- Centre Marcel Dionne in Drummondville, Quebec
- Centre Mario Gosselin in Thetford Mines, Quebec
- Arena Martin Brodeur in Montreal, Quebec
- Maurice Richard Arena in Montreal, Quebec
- Max Bell Centre in Calgary, Alberta
- John Labatt Centre in London, Ontario
- K. C. Irving Regional Centre in Bathurst, New Brunswick
- Paul Sauvé Arena in Montreal, Quebec
- Centre Pierre Charbonneau in Montreal, Quebec
- Ray Twinney Complex in Newmarket, Ontario
- Robert Guertin Centre in Gatineau, Quebec
- Arena Roberto Luongo in Montreal, Quebec
- Saputo Stadium in Montréal, Québec (named after the Saputo family, not the company that it controls)
- Steve Yzerman Arena in Nepean, Ontario
- Nat Bailey Stadium in Vancouver, British Columbia
- Morgan Firestone Arena in Ancaster, Ontario
- Al Palladini Community Center in Woodbridge, Ontario

== Cayman Islands ==
- Truman Bodden Stadium in George Town

== Central African Republic ==
- Barthelemy Boganda Stadium in Bangui

== Chile ==
- Estadio Carlos Dittborn in Arica

== China ==
- Ying Tung Natatorium in Beijing

== Colombia ==
- Estadio General Santander in Cúcuta
- Estadio Metropolitano Roberto Meléndez in Barranquilla
- Estadio Olímpico Pascual Guerrero in Cali

== Comoros ==
- Stade Said Mohamed Cheikh in Moroni

== Costa Rica ==
- Estadio Ricardo Saprissa Aymá in San Jose

== Côte d'Ivoire ==
- Stade Félix Houphouët-Boigny in Abidjan

== Croatia ==
- Dražen Petrović Basketball Hall in Zagreb

== Cuba ==
- Estadio Augusto César Sandino in Santa Clara
- Estadio Guillermón Moncada in Santiago

== Czech Republic ==
- Stadion Evžena Rošického in Prague
- Masaryk Circuit in Brno

== Democratic Republic of the Congo ==
- Stade Tata Raphaël in Kinshasa

== Dominican Republic ==
- Estadio Julián Javier in San Francisco de Macorís
- Estadio Tetelo Vargas in San Pedro de Macorís
- Estadio Francisco Micheli in La Romana

== Ecuador ==
- Estadio Modelo Alberto Spencer Herrera in Guayaquil

== Egypt ==
- Osman Ahmed Osman Stadium in Cairo

== El Salvador ==
- Estadio Jorge "Mágico" González in San Salvador

== Ethiopia ==
- Abebe Bikila Stadium in Addis Abeda

== Finland ==
- Arto Tolsa Areena in Kotka
- Paavo Nurmi Stadion in Turku

== France ==
- Bugatti Circuit, Le Mans
- Circuit Paul Ricard, Le Castellet, Var
- Court Philippe Chatrier, Paris
- Mini Circuit Patrick Depailler, Clermont-Ferrand
- Stade Marcel-Michelin, Clermont-Ferrand
- Stade de l'Abbé-Deschamps, Auxerre
- Stade Aimé Giral, Perpignan
- Stade Amédée-Domenech, Brive-la-Gaillarde
- Stade Auguste-Bonal, Montbéliard
- Stade Chaban-Delmas, Bordeaux
- Stade Ernest-Wallon, Toulouse
- Stade Félix-Bollaert, Lens
- Stade Geoffroy-Guichard, Saint-Étienne
- Stade Gilbert Brutus, Perpignan
- Stade Guy Boniface, Mont-de-Marsan
- Stade Jean-Bouin, Paris
- Jean-Bouin Stadium, Angers
- Stade Jean-Pierre Papin, Lesquin
- Circuit Louis Rosier, Clermont-Ferrand
- Stade Mayol, Toulon
- Stade Arsène Wenger, Duppigheim
- Stade Olympique Yves-du-Manoir, Colombes
- Stade Yves-du-Manoir, Montpellier

== Gabon ==
- Stade Omar Bongo in Libreville

== Georgia ==
- Boris Paichadze Stadium, Tbilisi
- Mikheil Meskhi Stadium, Tbilisi

== Germany ==
- Carl-Benz-Stadion in Mannheim
- Dietmar-Hopp-Stadion in Sinsheim
- Fritz-Walter-Stadion in Kaiserslautern
- Gottlieb-Daimler-Stadion in Stuttgart
- Gunda Niemann-Stirnemann Halle in Efurt
- Max-Schmeling-Halle in Berlin
- Motorsportarena Stefan Bellof in Buseck

== Ghana ==
- Ohene Djan Stadium in Accra

== Greece ==
- Georgios Karaiskakis Stadium in Athens
- Grigoris Lamprakis Stadium in Athens
- Georgios Kamaras Stadium in Athens
- Stavros Mavrothalassitis Stadium in Athens
- Spiros Louis Stadium in Athens
- Theodoros Vardinogiannis Stadium in Heraklion
- Anthi Karagianni Stadium in Kavala
- Kostas Davourlis Stadium in Patras
- Theodoros Kolokotronis Stadium in Tripoli
- Kaftanzoglio Stadium in Thessaloniki
- Kleanthis Vikelidis Stadium in Thessaloniki

== Guadeloupe ==
- Stade René Serge Nabajoth in Les Abymes

== Guatemala ==
- Estadio Mateo Flores in Guatemala City

== Haiti ==
- Stade Sylvio Cator in Port-au-Prince

== Honduras ==
- Estadio Francisco Morazán in San Pedro Hula

== Hong Kong ==
- Queen Elizabeth Stadium in Morrison Hill

== Hungary ==
- Ferenc Puskás Stadium in Budapest

== India ==
- Atal Bihari Vajpayee Stadium in Nadaun
- Anna Stadium in Tiruchirappalli
- Baichung Stadium in Namchi
- Bakhshi Stadium in Srinagar
- Barkatullah Khan Stadium in Jodhpur
- Bhim Rao Ambedkar International Sports Stadium in Lucknow
- Basawan Singh Indoor Stadium in Hajipur
- Bhamashah Stadium in Meerut
- Bhausaheb Bandodkar Ground in Margao
- Bilakhiya Stadium in Vapi
- Birsa Munda Athletics Stadium in Ranchi
- Birsa Munda Football Stadium in Ranchi
- Birsa Munda Hockey Stadium in Ranchi
- Brabourne Stadium in Mumbai
- Buddh International Circuit in Noida
- CN Annadurai Stadium (proposed) in Coimbatore
- Captain Roop Singh Stadium in Gwalior
- CB Patel International Cricket Stadium in Surat
- Chandrasekharan Nair Stadium in Thiruvananthapuram
- Chatrapati Shivaji Stadium in Karad
- Chaudhary Bansi Lal Cricket Stadium in Rohtak
- Dadaji Kondadev Stadium in Thane
- Dhyan Chand National Stadium in New Delhi
- Dhyan Chand Astroturf Stadium in Lucknow
- Dhruve Pandove Stadium in Patiala
- Dilip Tirkey Stadium in Rourkela
- Dr. Amdekar Stadium in Bijapur
- Dr. Akhilesh Das Stadium in Lucknow
- Dr. Bhupen Hazarika Cricket Stadium in Guwahati
- Dr. Karni Singh Shooting Range in Delhi
- Dr. Nagendra Jha Stadium in Darbhanga
- Dr. Rajendra Prasad Stadium in Margao
- Dr. Sampurnanda Stadium in Varanasi
- Dr. S.P. Mukherjee Swimming Stadium in Delhi
- Dr. Y.S. Rajasekhara Reddy ACA-VDCA Cricket Stadium in Visakhapatnam
- DY Patil Stadium in Navi Mumbai
- Eklavya Sports Stadium in Agra
- Feroz Shah Kotla in Delhi
- Gandhi Sports Complex Ground in Amritsar
- Gandhi Stadium in Amritsar
- Gandhi Ground in Udaipur
- G. M. C. Balayogi Athletic Stadium in Hyderabad
- Guru Gobind Singh Stadium in Jalandhar
- Guru Nanak Stadium in Ludhiana
- Harbax Singh Stadium in Delhi
- Holkar Cricket Stadium in Indore
- Indira Gandhi International Sports Stadium in Haldwani
- Indira Gandhi Athletic Stadium in Guwahati
- Indira Gandhi Arena in Delhi
- Indira Gandhi Stadium in Orai
- Indira Gandhi Stadium in Vijayawada
- Indira Gandhi Stadium in Una
- Indira Priyadarshini Stadium in Visakhapatnam
- Irwin Stadium in Delhi
- Jawahar Municipal Stadium in Kannur
- Jawaharlal Stadium in Chennai
- Jawaharlal Stadium in Dhanbad
- Jawaharlal Stadium in Guwahati
- Jawaharlal Stadium in Kochi
- Jawaharlal Stadium in New Delhi
- Jawaharlal Stadium in Pune
- Jawaharlal Stadium in Shillong
- Jawaharlal Stadium in Tiruchirappalli
- Jawaharlal Navoday Vidhyalay Stadium in Una
- Jimmy George Indoor Stadium in Thiruvananthapuram
- JRD Tata Sports Complex in Jamshedpur
- Kari Motor Speedway in Chennai
- Karnail Singh Stadium in Delhi
- K. D. Singh Babu Stadium in Barabanki
- K. D. Singh Babu Stadium in Lucknow
- Keenan Stadium in Jamshedpur
- Kotla Vijay Bhaskar Reddy Indoor Stadium in Hyderabad
- Lal Bahadur Shastri Stadium in Hyderabad
- Lal Bahadur Shastri Stadium in Kollam
- Lalabhai Contractor Stadium in Surat
- M. Chinnaswamy Stadium in Bangalore
- M. A. Chidambaram Stadium in Chennai
- Madhavrao Scindia Cricket Ground in Rajkot
- Madan Mohan Malviya Stadium in Allahabad
- Mahabir Stadium in Hissar
- Maharaja Bir Bikram College Stadium in Agartala
- Maharaja Aggarsain Stadium in Rohtak
- Maharaja Lakshman Sen Memorial College Ground in Sundar Nagar
- Maharana Pratap Khel Gaon in Udaipur
- Mahatma Gandhi Stadium in Salem
- Maulana Azad Stadium in Jammu
- Mayor Radhakrishnan Stadium in Chennai
- MGR Race Course Stadium in Madurai
- Mohan Kumar Mangalam Stadium in Bokaro Steel City
- Moin-ul-Haq Stadium in Patna
- Narendra Modi Stadium in Ahmedabad
- Narendra Mohan Sports Stadium in Mohan Nagar
- Neelam Sanjeeva Reddy Stadium in Anantapur
- Nehru Smarak Stadium in Bhagalpur
- Nahar Singh Stadium in Faridabad
- Nehru Stadium in Coimbatore
- Nehru Stadium in Durgapur
- Nehru Stadium in Indore
- Nehru Stadium in Kottayam
- Nehru Stadium in Margao
- Nehru Stadium in Gurgaon
- Netaji Indoor Stadium in Kolkata
- NTR Stadium in Gudivada
- NTR Stadium in Hyderabad
- Pandit Deendayal Upadhyay Indoor Stadium in Surat
- Punjab Cricket Association IS Bindra Stadium in Mohali
- Rabindra Sarobar Stadium in Kolkata
- Rajarathinam Stadium in Chennai
- Rajendra Stadium in Siwan
- Rajarshi Shahu Stadium in Kolhapur
- Rajiv Gandhi International Cricket Stadium in Dehradun
- Rajiv Gandhi International Cricket Stadium in Hyderabad
- Rajiv Gandhi Stadium Mualpui in Aizawl
- Ravi Shankar Shukla Stadium in Jabalpur
- R.K. Khanna Tennis Complex in Delhi
- Sardar Vallabhbhai Patel Indoor Stadium in Mumbai
- Sardar Patel Stadium, Motera in Ahmedabad
- Sardar Vallabhbhai Patel Stadium, Navrangpura in Ahmedabad
- Sardar Vallabhbhai Patel Stadium in Valsad
- Satindra Mohan Dev Stadium in Silchar
- Sawai Mansingh Stadium in Jaipur
- SDNR Wadeyar Stadium in Maysor
- Shah Satnam Ji Stadium in Sirsa
- Shaheed Veer Narayan Singh International Cricket Stadium in Naya Raipur
- Shaheed Krishan Chand Memorial Stadium in Mandi
- Shivaji Stadium in Delhi
- Shree Shiv Chhatrapati Sports Complex in Pune
- Shri Chhatrapati Shivaji Stadium in Kolhapur
- SPM Swimming Pool Complex in New Delhi
- Subrata Roy Sahara Stadium in Pune. Now Maharashtra Cricket Association Cricket Stadium
- Sumant Moolgaokar Stadium in Jamshedpur
- Surjit Hockey Stadium in Jalandhar
- Swami Vivekananda Stadium in Agartala
- Tau Devi Lal Stadium in Gurgaon
- Tilak Maidan Stadium in Vasco da Gama
- V.K.N. Menon Indoor Stadium in Thrissur
- VO Chidambaram Pillai Municipal Park Ground in Erode
- Wankhede Stadium in Mumbai
- Yashwant Stadium in Nagpur
- YS Raja Reddy Stadium in Cuddapah

== Indonesia ==
- Andi Mattalata Sports Complex in Makassar
  - Andi Mattalata Stadium
  - Andi Mattalatta Swimming Pool
- Baharoeddin Siregar Stadium in Deli Serdang
- Barnabas Youwe Stadium in Jayapura
- Diponegoro Stadium in Banyuwangi
- Gelora B.J. Habibie Sports Complex in Parepare
  - Gelora B.J. Habibie Stadium
  - Gelora B.J. Habibie Sport Hall
- Gelora Bumi Kartini Stadium in Jepara
- Gelora Bung Karno Sports Complex in Jakarta
  - Gelora Bung Karno Stadium
  - Gelora Bung Karno Madya Stadium
  - Istora Gelora Bung Karno
  - Gelora Bung Karno Aquatic Stadium
  - Gelora Bung Karno Tennis Indoor Stadium
  - Gelora Bung Karno Tennis Outdoor Stadium
  - Gelora Bung Karno Tennis Court
  - Gelora Bung Karno Baseball Stadium
  - Gelora Bung Karno Softball Field
  - Gelora Bung Karno Basketball Hall
  - Gelora Bung Karno Squash Stadium
  - Gelora Bung Karno Archery Field
  - Gelora Bung Karno Rugby Field
  - Gelora Bung Karno Arena
  - Gelora Bung Karno Gateball Court
- Gelora Bung Tomo Sports Complex in Surabaya
  - Gelora Bung Tomo Stadium
  - Gelora Bung Tomo Sport Hall
  - Gelora Bung Tomo Circuit
- Gelora Haji Agus Salim Stadium in Padang
- Hoegeng Stadium in Pekalongan
- Kaharuddin Nasution Rumbai Stadium in Pekanbaru
- Kapten I Wayan Dipta Stadium in Gianyar
- Lukas Enembe Sports Complex in Jayapura
  - Lukas Enembe Stadium
  - Istora Lukas Enembe
  - Lukas Enembe Aquatic Stadium
  - Lukas Enembe Shooting Arena
- Munaip Saleh Velodrome in Cimahi
- Ngurah Rai Stadium in Denpasar
- Rudy Hartono Badminton Hall in Jakarta
- Sasana Emas Greysia-Apriyani in Jakarta
- Soemantri Brodjonegoro Sports Complex in Jakarta
  - Soemantri Brodjonegoro Stadium
  - Soemantri Brodjonegoro Sport Hall
  - Soemantri Brodjonegoro Swimming Pool
  - Soemantri Brodjonegoro Tennis Court
- Sultan Agung Stadium in Bantul, Yogyakarta
- Susi Susanti Sport Hall in Tasikmalaya
- Taufik Hidayat Arena in Jakarta

== Iran ==
- Ali Daei Stadium in Ardabil

== Iraq ==
- Franso Hariri Stadium in Arbil

== Ireland ==
- Croke Park, Dublin
- Fitzgerald Stadium, Killarney
- MacHale Park, Castlebar
- Páirc Uí Chaoimh, Cork
- Semple Stadium, Thurles

== Israel ==
- Teddy Kollek Memorial Stadium in Jerusalem

== Italy ==
- PalaSojourner in Rieti
- Stadio Marc'Antonio Bentegodi in Verona
- Palasport Primo Carnera in Udine
- Circuito Internazionale L.Collari in Cassino
- L.Collari RC Raceway in Bologna
- Autodromo Enzo e Dino Ferrari in Imola
- Stadio Artemio Franchi in Florence
- Stadio Artemio Franchi – Montepaschi Arena in Siena
- Stadio Giuseppe Meazza (aka San Siro) in Milan
- Pista Olimpica di bob Eugenio Monti in Cortina d'Ampezzo
- Ongaroring in Sacile
- Autodromo Riccardo Paletti in Varano de' Melegari
- Stadio Armando Picchi in Livorno
- Road Race Riccione RC Circuit Marco Simoncelli in Riccione
- Mini Autodromo Jody Scheckter in Fiorano
- Miniautodromo Internazionale M. Rosati in Gubbio
- Stadio Ennio Tardini in Parma
- Autodromo Vallelunga Piero Taruffi in Campagnano di Roma
- Piscina Felice Scandone in Naples
- PalaBarbuto in Naples
- PalaArgento (obsolete) in Naples
- Stadio Diego Armando Maradona (formerly San Paolo) in Naples
- PalaStadera in Naples
- Stadio Partenopeo (obsolete), (aka Stadio Giorgio Ascarelli) in Naples
- Stadio Arturo Collana in Naples

== Jordan ==
- King Abdullah Stadium in Amman

== Kosovo ==
- Adem Jashari Olympic Stadium in Kosovska Mitrovica
- Fadil Vokrri Stadium in Prishtina

== Kuwait ==
- Jaber Al-Ahmad International Stadium in Kuwait City

== Lebanon ==
- Camille Chamoun Sports City Stadium in Beirut

== Libya ==
- Stad Hugo Chávez in Benina (became Martyrs of February Stadium following the uprising and civil war)

== Lithuania ==
- S. Darius and S. Girėnas Stadium in Kaunas

== Luxembourg ==
- Stade Josy Barthel in Luxembourg City

== Macedonia ==
- Boris Trajkovski Sports Center in Skopje
- Toše Proeski Arena in Skopje

== Malaysia ==
- Darul Aman Stadium in Alor Star
- Darul Makmur Stadium in Pahang
- Hang Jebat Stadium in Malacca City
- Sultan Ismail Nasiruddin Shah Stadium in Kuala Terengganu
- Sultan Mohammad IV Stadium in Kota Bharu
- Sultan Mizan Zainal Abidin Stadium in Kuala Terengganu
- Tan Sri Dato Haji Hassan Yunos Stadium in Johor
- Tuanku Abdul Rahman Stadium in Paroi

== Mali ==
- Stade Modibo Kéïta in Bamako

== Mexico ==
- Autódromo Hermanos Rodríguez in Mexico City
- Autódromo Miguel E. Abed in Amozoc, Puebla
- Estadio de Béisbol Alberto Romo Chávez in Aguascalientes
- Estadio de Béisbol Beto Ávila in Cancún
- Eduardo Vasconcelos Stadium in Oaxaca
- Estadio de Béisbol Francisco I. Madero in Saltillo
- Estadio de Béisbol Hermanos Serdán in Puebla
- Estadio Adolfo López Mateos in Reynosa
- Estadio Benito Juárez in Oaxaca
- Estadio Emilio Ibarra Almada in Los Mochis
- Estadio Nelson Barrera in Campeche
- Estadio Alfonso Lastras in San Luis
- Estadio Carlos Iturralde in Mérida
- Estadio Coruco Díaz in Zacatepec
- Estadio Francisco Villa in Zacatecas
- Estadio Francisco Zarco in Durango
- Estadio Héroe de Nacozari in Hermosillo
- Estadio Corregidora in Querétaro
- Estadio Luis de la Fuente in Veracruz
- Estadio Marte R. Gómez in Ciudad Victoria
- Estadio Miguel Alemán in Celaya
- Estadio Nemesio Díez in Toluca
- Estadio Olímpico Benito Juárez in Ciudad Juárez
- Estadio Sergio León Chávez in Irapuato
- Estadio Víctor Manuel Reyna in Tuxtla Gutierrez
- Auditorio Benito Juárez in Los Mochis
- Auditorio Benito Juárez in Veracruz
- Auditorio Fausto Gutierrez Moreno in Tijuana
- Gimnasio Miguel Hidalgo in Puebla
- Gimnasio Olímpico Juan de la Barrera in Mexico City
- Gymnasio Manuel Bernardo Aguirre in Chihuahua
- Polifórum Benito Juárez in Cancún
- Trióvalo Bernardo Obregón in Guadalajara

== Monaco ==
- Stade Louis II in Fontvieille

== Morocco ==
- Stade Mohamed V in Casablanca
- Stade Larbi Benbarek in Casablanca

== Myanmar ==
- Bogyoke Aung San Stadium in Yangon

== Namibia ==
- Hage Geingob Rugby Stadium in Windhoek
- J. Stephanus Stadium in Keetmanshoop
- Oscar Norich Stadium in Tsumeb
- Sam Nujoma Stadium in Katutura

== Netherlands ==
- Abe Lenstra Stadion in Heerenveen
- Fanny Blankers-Koen Stadion in Hengelo
- Ireen Wüst IJsbaan in Tilburg
- Jaap Edenbaan in Amsterdam
- Johan Cruijff Arena in Amsterdam

== Netherlands Antilles ==
- Ergilio Hato Stadium in Willemstad

== New Zealand ==
- Bert Sutcliffe Oval in Lincoln
- Cobham Oval in Whangarei
- Harry Barker Reserve in Te Hapara
- Owen Delany Park in Taupo
- Queen Elizabeth II Park in Christchurch

== Nicaragua ==
- Dennis Martínez National Stadium in Managua

== Niger ==
- Général Seyni Kountché Stadion in Niamey

== Nigeria ==
- Sani Abacha Stadium in Kano
- MKO Abiola Stadium in Abeojuta
- Adokiye Amiesimaka Stadium in POrt Harcourt
- Dan Anyiam Stadium in Owerri
- Teslim Balogun Stadium in Lagos
- Samuel Ogbemudia Stadium in Benin City
- Samson Siasia Sports Stadium in Yenegoa

== North Korea ==
- Kim Il-sung Stadium in Pyongyang

== Oman ==
- Sultan Qaboos Sports Complex in Muscat

== Pakistan ==
- Arbab Niaz Stadium in Peshawar
- Asghar Ali Shah Cricket Stadium in Karachi
- Ayub National Stadium in Quetta
- Bahawal Stadium in Bahawalpur
- Bagh-e-Jinnah in Lahore
- Gaddafi Hockey Stadium in Karachi
- Gaddafi Stadium in Lahore
- Iqbal Stadium in Faisalabad
- Jinnah Sports Stadium in Islamabad
- Jinnah Stadium in Gujranwala
- Jinnah Stadium in Sialkot
- Niaz Stadium in Hyderabad
- Qayyum Stadium in Peshawar
- Quaid-e-Azam Stadium in Mirpur
- Shaheed Mohtarama Benazir Bhutto International Cricket Stadium in Garhi Khuda Bakhsh
- Zafar Ali Stadium in Sahiwal
- Zamir Jaffri Cricket Stadium in Jhelum

== Panama ==
- Estadio Rommel Fernández in Panama City

== Papua New Guinea ==
- Hubert Murray Stadium in Port Morseby

== Paraguay ==
- Estadio General Pablo Rojas in Asunción

== Peru ==
- Estadio Jorge Basadre in Tacna

== Philippines ==
- Marcos Stadium in Laogag
- Rizal Memorial Sports Complex in Manila
  - Ninoy Aquino Stadium
  - Rizal Memorial Baseball Stadium
  - Rizal Memorial Coliseum
  - Rizal Memorial Stadium

== Poland ==
- Stadion Jana Pawla II in Kraków

== Portugal ==
- Estádio D. Afonso Henriques in Guimarães
- Estádio José Alvalade in Lisbon
- Estádio Dr. Magalhães Pessoa in Leiria
- Estádio Municipal Sérgio Conceição in Coimbra

== Puerto Rico ==
- Hiram Bithorn Stadium in San Juan
- Roberto Clemente Stadium in Carolina

== Qatar ==
- Abdullah bin Khalifa Stadium in Doha
- Ahmed bin Ali Stadium in Al Rayyan
- Hamad bin Khalifa Stadium in Doha
- Khalifa International Stadium in Doha
- Jassim Bin Hamad Stadium in Doha
- Suheim Bin Hamad Stadium in Doha
- Saoud bin Abdulrahman Stadium in Al Wakrah
- Thani bin Jassim Stadium in Doha

== Republic of the Congo ==
- Stade Omnisport Marien Ngouabi d'Owando in Owando

== Romania ==
- Present day stadiums:
  - Stadionul Viorel Mateianu in Baia Mare
  - Stadionul Dan Păltinişanu in Timişoara
  - Stadionul Anghel Iordănescu in Voluntari
  - Stadionul Cătălin Hîldan in Brăneşti
  - Stadionul Cornel Negoescu in Buzău
  - Baza Sportivă Dan Anca in Cluj-Napoca
  - Stadionul Dr. Constantin Rădulescu in Cluj-Napoca
  - Stadionul Nicolae Rainea in Galați
  - Stadionul Dumitru Mătărău in Ștefăneștii de Jos
  - Stadionul Emil Alexandrescu in Iaşi
  - Stadionul Eugen Popescu in Târgoviște
  - Stadionul Florea Dumitrache in Bucharest
  - Stadionul Francisc Matei in Beiuș
  - Stadionul Francisc von Neuman in Arad
  - Stadionul Giulești-Valentin Stănescu in Bucharest
  - Stadionul Jean Pădureanu in Bistrița
  - Stadionul Iftimie Ilisei in Medgidia
  - Stadionul Ion Comșa in Călărași
  - Stadionul Ion Oblemenco in Craiova
  - Stadionul Iuliu Bodola in Oradea
  - Stadionul Ladislau Bölöni in Târgu Mureș
  - Stadionul Constantin Anghelache in Bacău
  - Stadionul Marin Anastasovici in Giurgiu
  - Stadionul Mihai Adam in Câmpia Turzii
  - Stadionul Michael Klein in Hunedoara
  - Stadionul Mircea Chivu in Reșița
  - Stadionul Nicolae Dobrin in Pitești
  - Stadionul Daniel Prodan in Satu Mare
  - Stadionul Otto Greffner in Șiria
  - Stadionul Vasile Enache in Modelu
  - Stadionul Silviu Ploeșteanu in Brașov
  - Stadionul Tudor Vladimirescu in Târgu Jiu
  - Baza Sportivă Zoltan David in Galați
- Former stadiums:
  - Stadionul Ion Moina in Cluj-Napoca
  - Stadionul Lia Manoliu in Bucharest

== Russia ==
- Eduard Streltsov Stadium in Moscow
- Grigory Fedotov Stadium in Moscow

== St. Lucia ==
- George Odlum Stadium in Vieux Fort

== Saudi Arabia ==
- King Abdul Aziz Stadium in Meccah
- King Fahd International Stadium in Riyadh
- Prince Mohamed bin Fahd Stadium in Dammam

== Senegal ==
- Stade Leopold Senghor in Dakar

== Serbia ==
- Stadion Kralj Petar I in Belgrade
- Rajko Mitić Stadium in Belgrade
- Karađorđe Stadium in Novi Sad

== Slovakia ==
- Štadión Antona Malatinského in Trnava

== South Africa ==
- Chatsworth Stadium in Durban
- Charles Mopeli Stadium in Phuthaditjhaba
- Ellis Park Stadium in Johannesburg
- Harry Gwala Stadium in Pietermaritzburg
- HM Pitje Stadium in Pretoria
- King Zwelithini Stadium in Durban
- Jan Smuts Ground in East London
- Jan Smuts Stadium in East London
- Moses Mabhida Stadium in Durban
- Loftus Versfeld Stadium in Pretoria
- Lucas Moripe Stadium in Pretoria
- Peter Mokaba Stadium in Polokwane
- Princess Magogo Stadium in Durban
- Seisa Ramabodu Stadium in Bloemfontein
- SJ Smith Stadium in Durban
- Themba Senamela Stadium in Witbank

== South Korea ==
- Guus Hiddink Stadium in Gwangju

== Spain ==
- Camp Municipal Narcís Sala in Barcelona
- Coliseum Alfonso Pérez in Getafe
- Estadio Carlos Belmonte in Albacete
- Carlos Tartiere Stadium in Oviedo
- Fernando Buesa Arena in Vitoria-Gasteiz
- Estadio Fernando Torres in Fuenlabrada
- Estadio Heliodoro Rodríguez López in Tenerife
- Estadio Luis Casanova (formerIy) in Valencia
- José María Martín Carpena Arena in Málaga
- Estadio Lluis Sitjar in Palma de Mallorca
- Estadi Olímpic Lluís Companys in Barcelona
- Estadio Manuel Ruiz de Lopera in Sevilla
- Estadio Ramón Sánchez Pizjuán in Sevilla
- Estadio José Zorrilla in Valladolid
- Estadio José Rico Pérez in Alicante
- Estadio Príncipe Felipe in Cáceres
- Estadio Francisco de la Hera in Almendralejo
- Estadio Román Suárez Puerta in Avilés
- Estadio Hermanos Antuña in Mieres
- Estadio Alfonso Murube in Ceuta
- Estadio Municipal Álvarez Claro in Melilla
- Estadio El Molinón-Enrique Castro "Quini" in Gijón
- Estadio Verónica Boquete de San Lázaro in Santiago de Compostela
- Ricardo Tormo Circuit in Valencia
- Johan Cruyff Stadium in Sant Joan Despí
- Pabellón Príncipe Felipe in Zaragoza
- Pabellón Pedro Ferrándiz in Alicante
- Pabellón Jorge Garbajosa in Torrejón de Ardoz
- Pabellón Insular Santiago Martín in San Cristóbal de La Laguna
- Palacio de los Deportes Carolina Marín in Huelva
- Polideportivo Fernando Martín in Fuenlabrada
- Estadio Santiago Bernabéu in Madrid
- Vicente Calderón Stadium in Madrid

== Suriname ==
- Ronnie Brunswijkstadion in Moengo

== Sri Lanka ==
- Asgiriya Stadium in Kandy
- Mahinda Rajapaksa International Stadium in Hambantota
- Paikiasothy Saravanamuttu Stadium in Colombo
- R. Premadasa Stadium in Colombo
- Sugathadasa Stadium in Colombo
- Tyronne Fernando Stadium in Moratuwa
- Welagedara Stadium in Kurunegala

== Sweden ==
- Avicii Arena in Stockholm

== Syria ==
- Khalid ibn al-Walid Stadium in Homs

== Tanzania ==
- Amaan Stadium in Zanzibar
- Benjamin Mkapa National Stadium in Dar es Salaam
- Sheikh Amri Abeid Memorial Stadium in Arusha

== Thailand ==
- Bira Circuit in Pattaya

== Togo ==
- Stade Général Eyadema in Lome

== Trinidad and Tobago ==
- Ato Boldon Stadium in Couva
- Brian Lara Stadium in Tarouba
- Dwight Yorke Stadium in Bacolet
- Hasely Crawford Stadium in Port of Spain
- Larry Gomes Stadium in Malabar
- Manny Ramjohn Stadium in Marabella
- Marvin Lee Stadium in Tunapuna

== Turkey ==
- Abdi Ipekçi Arena in Istanbul
- Ali Sami Yen Stadium in Istanbul
- Atatürk Olympic Stadium in Istanbul
- Hamdi Akın Sports Hall in Istanbul
- BJK İnönü Stadium in Istanbul
- İzmir Atatürk Stadium in İzmir
- Kayseri Atatürk Stadium in Kayseri
- Şükrü Saracoğlu Stadium in Istanbul

== Uganda ==
- Mandela National Stadium in Kampala It is named after the former South African president, the late Nelson Mandela.
- Muteesa II Stadium in Kampala. It is named after Mutesa II of Buganda.

== United Arab Emirates ==
- Hamdan Sports Complex in Dubai
- Hazza bin Zayed Stadium in Al Ain
- Khalid bin Mohammed Stadium in Sharjah
- Mohammed bin Zayed Stadium in Abu Dhabi
- Maktoum bin Rashid Al Maktoum Stadium in Dubai
- Sheikh Zayed Cricket Stadium in Abu Dhabi
- Sheikh Khalifa International Stadium in Al Ain
- Tahnoun bin Mohammed Stadium in Al Ain
- Zayed Sports City Stadium in Abu Dhabi

== United Kingdom ==
- Adams Park in High Wycombe, England
- Amaechi Basketball Centre in Manchester, England
- Sir Chris Hoy Velodrome in Dalmarnock, Glasgow, Scotland – named after Sir Chris Hoy
- Roger Bannister running track in Oxford, England
- John Charles Centre for Sport in Leeds, England
- Fenner's in Cambridge, England
- Linford Christie Stadium in London, England
- Ludwig Guttmann Sports Centre for the Disabled in Stoke Mandeville, England
- Harvey Hadden Stadium in Bilborough, Nottingham, England
- Redgrave Pinsent Rowing Lake in Oxfordshire, England
- Sharron Davies Centre in Plymouth, England
- Paula Radcliffe Athletics Stadium in Loughborough, England – named after Paula Radcliffe
- Shanaze Reade BMX Track in Crewe, England – named after Shanaze Reade
- Kassam Stadium in Oxford, England
- Madejski Stadium in Reading, England
- Casement Park in Belfast, Northern Ireland
- Queen Elizabeth Olympic Park in London, England – named after Elizabeth II

== United States ==
=== Future named Major League (MLB, NFL, NBA, NHL, MLS) venues ===
==== Full names ====
- Rickey Henderson Field, in Oakland, California. Originally Oakland–Alameda County Coliseum
  - Oakland Athletics named the Coliseum field "Rickey Henderson Field" on Opening Day, April 3, 2017. Henderson also serves as a Special Assistant to the President.

=== Presently named Major League (MLB, NFL, NBA, NHL, MLS) venues ===
==== Full names ====
- Robert F. Kennedy Memorial Stadium in Washington, D.C.

==== Surname only ====
- Lambeau Field in Green Bay, Wisconsin
- Kauffman Stadium in Kansas City
- BMO Harris Bradley Center in Milwaukee
- Turner Field in Atlanta
- Busch Memorial Stadium in St. Louis
  - August Busch named the stadium after himself after the original name, Budweiser Stadium, was vetoed by Major League Baseball. Since then, breweries have been allowed to directly name stadiums, and Anheuser-Busch owns the naming rights to the current Busch Stadium. The current name can be interpreted as either the family name or that of Busch Beer.
- Wrigley Field in Chicago

=== Formerly named Major League (MLB, NFL, NBA, NHL, MLS) venues ===
==== Full names ====
- Brendan Byrne Arena in East Rutherford, New Jersey. Later Continental Airlines Arena and Izod Center, now the non-sponsored Meadowlands Arena.
- Hubert H. Humphrey Metrodome in Minneapolis. Demolished in 2014.
- Joe Louis Arena in Detroit, Michigan. Demolished in 2020
- John F. Kennedy Stadium in Philadelphia. Demolished in 1992.
- Jack Murphy Stadium in San Diego. Later known as Qualcomm Stadium and SDCCU Stadium before reverting to its original name of San Diego Stadium and being demolished in 2021.
- Joe Robbie Stadium in Miami Gardens. Now named Hard Rock Stadium.
- Ralph Wilson Stadium in Orchard Park, New York. Originally Rich Stadium, it became New Era Field in 2016. After New Era chose to exit its sponsorship contract early, the stadium became Bills Stadium in 2020 before becoming Highmark Stadium in 2021.
- Paul Brown Stadium in Cincinnati, Ohio. The stadium name was changed to Paycor Stadium on August 9, 2022, prior to the first preseason home game in 2022.

==== Surname only ====
- Jacobs Field in Cleveland, now Progressive Field.
- Kiel Center in St. Louis, later Savvis Center and Scottrade Center, now Enterprise Center.
- Wrigley Field in Chicago, Illinois
- Shibe Park, also known as Connie Mack Stadium, in Philadelphia
- Crosley Field in Cincinnati
- Comiskey Park and New Comiskey Park in Chicago. The latter is now Rate Field.
- Ebbets Field in Brooklyn, New York
- Forbes Field in Pittsburgh
- Griffith Stadium in Washington, D.C.
- Muehlebach Field aka Ruppert Stadium (aka Municipal Stadium) in Kansas City
- Navin Field aka Briggs Stadium aka Tiger Stadium in Detroit
- Sick's Stadium in Seattle
- Robison Field in St. Louis
- Shea Stadium in Flushing, Queens, New York

=== Presently named Minor League, and other significant sports venues ===
==== Full name ====
===== Indoor =====
- Bryce Jordan Center in University Park, Pennsylvania
- Bud Walton Arena in Fayetteville, Arkansas
- Cam Henderson Center in Huntington, West Virginia
- Charlotte Y. Martin Centre in Spokane, Washington
- Dean E. Smith Student Activities Center in Chapel Hill, North Carolina
- Donald L. Tucker Center in Tallahassee, Florida
- Harry A. Gampel Pavilion in Storrs, Connecticut
- James H. Hilton Coliseum in Ames, Iowa
- John F. Kennedy Civic Arena in Rome, New York
- Joseph J. Gentile Arena in Chicago
- Lawrence Joel Veterans Memorial Coliseum in Winston-Salem, North Carolina
- The Sandy and John Black Pavilion at Ole Miss in Oxford, Mississippi
- Tsongas Center in Lowell, Massachusetts
- Pete Maravich Assembly Center in Baton Rouge, Louisiana
- Silvio O. Conte Forum in Newton, Massachusetts
- William D. Mullins Memorial Center in Amherst, Massachusetts
- Winfield Dunn Center in Clarksville, Tennessee

===== Outdoor =====
- Arthur W. Perdue Stadium in Salisbury, Maryland
- Ben Hill Griffin Stadium in Gainesville, Florida
- Bob Ford Field in Albany, New York (set to open in 2013)
- Bobby Bowden Field at Doak Campbell Stadium in Tallahassee, Florida
- Boone Pickens Stadium in Stillwater, Oklahoma
- C. O. Brown Stadium in Battle Creek, Michigan
- Calvin Falwell Field in Lynchburg, Virginia
- Cliff Hagan Stadium in Lexington, Kentucky
- Daniel S. Frawley Stadium in Wilmington, Delaware
- David Booth Kansas Memorial Stadium in Lawrence, Kansas
- Davis Wade Stadium in Starkville, Mississippi
- Dr. Mark & Cindy Lynn Stadium in Louisville, Kentucky
- E.J. Block Athletic Field in East Chicago, Indiana
- Ed Smith Stadium in Sarasota, Florida
- Edward A. LeLacheur Park in Lowell, Massachusetts
- Ernie Shore Field in Winston-Salem, North Carolina
- G. Richard Pfitzner Stadium in Woodbridge, Virginia
- George M. Steinbrenner Field in Tampa, Florida
- H. P. Hunnicutt Field in Princeton, West Virginia
- Hank Aaron Stadium in Mobile, Alabama
- Harry C. Pohlman Field in Beloit, Wisconsin
- Harry Grove Stadium in Frederick, Maryland
- Herschel Greer Stadium in Nashville, Tennessee
- Homer Stryker Field in Kalamazoo, Michigan
- Howard J. Lamade Stadium in South Williamsport, Pennsylvania
- Hunter Wright Stadium in Kingsport, Tennessee
- Jack Trice Stadium in Ames, Iowa
- Jackie Robinson Ballpark in Daytona Beach, Florida
- Jerry Kindall Field at Frank Sancet Stadium in Tucson, Arizona
- Jim Patterson Stadium in Louisville, Kentucky
- Joan C. Edwards Stadium in Huntington, West Virginia
- Joe O'Brien Field in Elizabethton, Tennessee
- Joe W. Davis Stadium in Huntsville, Alabama
- John O'Donnell Stadium in Davenport, Iowa
- John Thurman Field in Modesto, California
- Joker Marchant Stadium in Lakeland, Florida
- Joseph L. Bruno Stadium in Troy, New York
- Joseph P. Riley Jr. Park in Charleston, South Carolina
- Kinnick Stadium in Iowa City, Iowa
- Maimonides Park in Brooklyn, New York – While it received its current name via a sponsorship deal with the local Maimonides Medical Center, the hospital was named after the famed medieval philosopher and rabbi Moses ben Maimon, known to the Western world as Maimonides.
- Alex Rodriguez Park at Mark Light Field in Coral Gables, Florida
- Nelson W. Wolff Municipal Stadium in San Antonio, Texas
- Philip B. Elfstrom Stadium in Geneva, Illinois
- Roger Dean Stadium in Jupiter, Florida
- Sam Lynn Ballpark in Bakersfield, California
- Stanley Coveleski Regional Stadium in South Bend, Indiana
- Senator Thomas J. Dodd Memorial Stadium in Norwich, Connecticut
- Tom Tellez Track at Carl Lewis International Complex in Houston, Texas
- Tony and Nancy Moye Football and Lacrosse Complex in Macon, Georgia
- Wendell & Vickie Bell Soccer Complex in Lexington, Kentucky

==== Surname only ====
===== Indoor =====
- Alfond Arena in Orono, Maine
- Allen Fieldhouse in Lawrence, Kansas
- Beasley Performing Arts Coliseum in Pullman, Washington
- Breslin Student Events Center in East Lansing, Michigan
- Carver–Hawkeye Arena in Iowa City, Iowa
- Crisler Center in Ann Arbor, Michigan
- Finneran Pavilion in Villanova, Pennsylvania
- Galen Center in Los Angeles, California
- Huff Hall in Champaign, Illinois
- The Liacouras Center in Philadelphia, Pennsylvania
- McCarthey Athletic Center in Spokane, Washington
- McLeod Center in Cedar Falls, Iowa
- Neville Arena in Auburn, Alabama
- Pauley Pavilion in Los Angeles, California
- Resch Center in Green Bay, Wisconsin
- Rupp Arena in Lexington, Kentucky
- St. John Arena in Columbus, Ohio
- Thompson–Boling Arena in Knoxville, Tennessee
- Yost Ice Arena in Ann Arbor, Michigan

===== Outdoor =====
- Alfond Stadium in Orono, Maine
- Beaver Stadium in State College, Pennsylvania
- Blair Field in Long Beach, California
- Bosse Field in Evansville, Indiana
- Bowman Field in Williamsport, Pennsylvania
- Breese Stevens Field in Madison, Wisconsin
- Bryant–Denny Stadium in Tuscaloosa, Alabama
- Calfee Park in Pulaski, Virginia
- Campanelli Stadium in Brockton, Massachusetts
- Cashman Field in Las Vegas
- Cheney Stadium in Tacoma, Washington
- Cobb Field in Billings, Montana
- Cohen Stadium in El Paso, Texas
- Cooper Stadium in Columbus, Ohio (slated to be replaced in 2008)
- Damaschke Field in Oneonta, New York
- DeVault Memorial Stadium in Bristol, Virginia
- Dickey-Stephens Park in North Little Rock, Arkansas
- Disch–Falk Field in Austin, Texas
- Doubleday Field in Cooperstown, New York
- Dwyer Stadium in Batavia, New York
- Elliot Ballpark in Storrs, Connecticut
- Evans Diamond in Berkeley, California
- Fleming Stadium in Wilson, North Carolina
- Foster Field in San Angelo, Texas
- Fraser Field in Lynn, Massachusetts
- Frawley Stadium in Wilmington, Delaware
- Goodwin Field in Fullerton, California
- Goss Stadium at Coleman Field in Corvallis, Oregon
- Grayson Stadium in Savannah, Georgia
- Growden Memorial Park in Fairbanks, Alaska
- Hadlock Field in Portland, Maine
- Hammond Stadium in South Fort Myers, Florida
- Hammons Field in Springfield, Missouri
- Holman Stadium in Nashua, New Hampshire
- Holman Stadium in Vero Beach, Florida
- Jordan–Hare Stadium in Auburn, Alabama
- Kenan Memorial Stadium in Chapel Hill, North Carolina
- Kindrick Legion Field in Helena, Montana
- Kinnick Stadium in Iowa City, Iowa
- Lawrence–Dumont Stadium in Wichita, Kansas
- McColl–Richardson Field in Charlotte, North Carolina
- McCormick Field in Asheville, North Carolina
- McCoy Stadium in Pawtucket, Rhode Island
- Miller Motorsports Park, Tooele, Utah
- Neyland Stadium in Knoxville, Tennessee
- O'Brate Stadium in Stillwater, Oklahoma
- O'Brien Field in Peoria, Illinois
- Packard Stadium in Tempe, Arizona
- Raley Field in Sacramento, California
- Rentschler Field in East Hartford, Connecticut
- Rice-Eccles Stadium in Salt Lake City
- Ripken Stadium in Aberdeen, Maryland
- Roebling Road Raceway in Effingham County, Georgia
- Sanford Stadium in Athens, Georgia
- Vaught–Hemingway Stadium in Oxford, Mississippi
- Williams-Brice Stadium in Columbia, South Carolina
- Yulman Stadium in New Orleans, Louisiana

==== Full name and surname only ====
These venues bear the full name of at least one person and the surname only of at least one different person. This most often occurs when a university adds the name of a new donor or other significant figure to an existing venue.

===== Outdoor =====
- Bobby Dodd Stadium at Historic Grant Field in Atlanta, Georgia
- Dudy Noble Field, Polk–DeMent Stadium in Starkville, Mississippi
- Phil Hurd Raceway in Savannah, Georgia

=== Formerly named minor league and other significant use sports venues ===
- Al Lopez Field in Tampa (spring training)
- Calvin Griffith Park in Charlotte, North Carolina
- Crutcher Scott Field in Abilene, Texas
- Dillon Stadium in Hartford, Connecticut
- Jerry Uht Park in Erie, Pennsylvania
- Jim Crockett Memorial Park in Charlotte, North Carolina
- Johnny Rosenblatt Stadium in Omaha, Nebraska
- John Eleuthère du Pont Pavilion in Villanova, Pennsylvania
- Louis J. Tullio Arena in Erie, Pennsylvania
- Ralph Munroe Marine Stadium in Miami
- Ray Winder Field in Little Rock, Arkansas
- Robert B. Sutton Stadium in Tulsa, Oklahoma
- Tim McCarver Stadium in Memphis, Tennessee
- Thorp Raceway in Pomona, California

== Uruguay ==
- Estadio Luis Franzini in Montevideo
- Jardines del Hipódromo María Mincheff de Lazaroff Stadium in Montevideo

== Venezuela ==
- Estadio Luis Aparicio El Grande in Maracaibo
- Estadio Alfonso Chico Carrasquel in Puerto la Cruz

== Zambia ==
- Arthur Davies Stadium in Kitwe
- Dag Hammarskjöld Stadium in Ndola
- Edwin Imboela Stadium in Lusaka
- Levy Mwanawasa Stadium in Ndola

== See also ==
- Lists of sports venues
- Lists of stadiums
