= 2016–17 Santosh Trophy qualification =

Tournament details
- Country: India

The 2016–17 Santosh Trophy qualifiers are the qualifiers for the 2016–17 Santosh Trophy. All the teams participating in the qualifiers are divided into five zones based on where they are based and each zone is divided into two groups each.

== Format ==
Each team is put into five zones; each zone has two groups. The leaders of every group qualify for the tournament proper.

== North Zone ==
=== Group A ===
Pos	Team	Pld	W	D	L	GF	GA	GD	Pts	Qualification
1	Chandigarh	3	3	0	0	7	1	+6	9	Advance to Final Round
2	Himachal Pradesh	3	2	0	1	6	7	−1	6	
3	Uttar Pradesh	3	1	0	2	4	6	−2	3	
4	Delhi	3	0	0	3	0	3	−3	0	

Updated to match(es) played on 1 January 2017. Source:
Rules for classification: 1) points; 2) goal difference; 3) goals scored; 4) head-to-head result.

27 December 2016	Himachal Pradesh	1–4	Chandigarh	Sundar Nagar
	Tenzin	Report	Jatinder 49'; Girik 56', 84'; Singh 89'	Stadium: Maharaja Lakshman Sen Memorial College Ground

27 December 2016	Delhi	0–1	Uttar Pradesh	Sundar Nagar
		Report	Sanyog Yadav	Stadium: Maharaja Lakshman Sen Memorial College Ground

29 December 2016	Chandigarh	1–0	Delhi	Sundar Nagar
	A. Singh	Report		Stadium: Maharaja Lakshman Sen Memorial College Ground

29 December 2016	Uttar Pradesh	3–4	Himachal Pradesh	Sundar Nagar
	Chaudhary; Vivek; Ballu	Report	Bali; Hemant; Tshepel; Midhun	Stadium: Maharaja Lakshman Sen Memorial College Ground

31 December 2016	Chandigarh	2–0	Uttar Pradesh	Sundar Nagar
	Girik Khosla; Gagandeep Singh			Stadium: Maharaja Lakshman Sen Memorial College Ground

31 December 2016	Himachal Pradesh	1–0	Delhi	Sundar Nagar
	Gagandeep Bali			Stadium: Maharaja Lakshman Sen Memorial College Ground

=== Group B ===
Pos	Team	Pld	W	D	L	GF	GA	GD	Pts	Qualification
1	Punjab	3	3	0	0	5	0	+5	9	Advance to Final Round
2	Jammu and Kashmir	3	1	1	1	2	2	0	4	
3	Uttarakhand	3	1	0	2	1	0	+1	3	
4	Haryana	3	0	1	2	1	3	−2	1	

Rules for classification: 1) points; 2) goal difference; 3) goals scored; 4) head-to-head result.

28 December 2016	Punjab	3–0	Uttarakhand	Sundar Nagar
	R. Singh 17', 74'; B. Singh 32'	Report		Stadium: Maharaja Lakshman Sen Memorial College Ground

28 December 2016	Jammu and Kashmir	1–1	Haryana	Sundar Nagar
	Hanan 87'	Report	Amarjeet 18'	Stadium: Maharaja Lakshman Sen Memorial College Ground

30 December 2016	Uttarakhand	0–1	Jammu and Kashmir	Sundar Nagar
		Report	Hanan Mir	Stadium: Maharaja Lakshman Sen Memorial College Ground

30 December 2016	Haryana	0–1	Punjab	Sundar Nagar
		Report	B. Singh 48'	Stadium: Maharaja Lakshman Sen Memorial College Ground

1 January 2017	Uttarakhand	1–0	Haryana	Sundar Nagar
	Anuj Rawat 71'	Report		Stadium: Maharaja Lakshman Sen Memorial College Ground

1 January 2017	Punjab	1–0	Jammu and Kashmir	Sundar Nagar
	Rajbir Singh 77'	Report		Stadium: Maharaja Lakshman Sen Memorial College Ground

== South Zone ==
=== Group A ===
Pos	Team	Pld	W	D	L	GF	GA	GD	Pts	Qualification
1	Kerala	3	2	1	0	6	0	+6	7	Advance to Final Round
2	Karnataka	3	1	1	1	5	3	+2	4	
3	Andhra Pradesh	3	1	1	1	5	4	+1	4	
4	Pondicherry	3	0	1	2	0	7	−7	1	

Updated to match(es) played on 9 January 2017. Source:
Rules for classification: 1) points; 2) goal difference; 3) goals scored; 4) head-to-head result.

5 January 2017	Andhra Pradesh	3–1	Karnataka	EMS Stadium, Kozhikode
	S.Varun 37', 76'; K.Rohan 84'	Report	Vignesh 25'

5 January 2017	Kerala	3–0	Pondicherry	EMS Stadium, Kozhikode
	Jobby Justin 3'; P. Usman 57', 66'	Report

7 January 2017	Karnataka	4–0	Pondicherry	EMS Stadium, Kozhikode
	Anto Xavier 28', 36'; S. Suman 40' (o.g.) A. Don Bosco 94'	Report

7 January 2017	Kerala	3–2	Andhra Pradesh	EMS Stadium, Kozhikode
	P. Usman 2'; Sahal Abdul Samad 22'; Lijo 28'	Report	S.Varun 13', 39'

9 January 2017	Andhra Pradesh	0–0	Pondicherry	EMS Stadium, Kozhikode
		Report

9 January 2017	Kerala	0–0	Karnataka	EMS Stadium, Kozhikode
		Report

=== Group B ===
Pos	Team	Pld	W	D	L	GF	GA	GD	Pts	Qualification
1	Services	3	3	0	0	13	1	+12	9	Advance to Final Round
2	Tamil Nadu	3	2	0	1	7	2	+5	6	
3	Lakshadweep	3	1	0	2	1	6	−5	3	
4	Telangana	3	0	0	3	0	12	−12	0	

Updated to match(es) played on 10 January 2017. Source:
Rules for classification: 1) points; 2) goal difference; 3) goals scored; 4) head-to-head result.

6 January 2017	Services	7–0	Telangana	EMS Stadium, Kozhikode
	Jain 45+3' Irshad 47'; Arjun Tudu 62', 90+3'; Mandeep 86', 90+2'; Bharath (90 o. g.)	Report

6 January 2017	Tamil Nadu	2–0	Lakshadweep	EMS Stadium, Kozhikode
	S. Shinu 9'; Irshad 90+5'	Report

8 January 2017	Services	4–0	Lakshadweep	EMS Stadium, Kozhikode
	Arshad 8'; Saroj Rai 25', 56'; Tudu 90+4'	Report Archived 2024-12-28 at the Wayback Machine(subscription required)

8 January 2017	Tamil Nadu	4–0	Telangana	EMS Stadium, Kozhikode
	A. Raegan 15', 23', 79'; S. Nanda Kumar 38'	Report

10 January 2017	Tamil Nadu	1–2	Services	EMS Stadium, Kozhikode
	A. Jacksan Dhas 32'	Report	Arjun Tudu 52'; Britto 71'

10 January 2017	Lakshadweep	1–0	Telangana	EMS Stadium, Kozhikode
	K. P. Ummer 54'	Report

== East Zone ==
=== Group A ===
Pos	Team	Pld	W	D	L	GF	GA	GD	Pts	Qualification
1	West Bengal	2	2	0	0	4	1	+3	6	Advance to Final Round
2	Orissa	2	1	0	1	5	3	+2	3	
3	Chhattisgarh	2	0	0	2	2	7	−5	0	

Rules for classification: 1) points; 2) goal difference; 3) goals scored; 4) head-to-head result.

29 December 2016	West Bengal	2–1	Chhattisgarh	Bokaro Steel City
				Stadium: Mohan Kumar Mangalam Stadium

31 December 2016	Chhattisgarh	1–5	Orissa	Bokaro Steel City
	Harkit Singh 39'		Sheikh Shahbaaz Alam 6'; Bijaya Ghallan 21'; Sheikh Mustakim 45+2', 72'; Rajak Nag 90+3'	Stadium: Mohan Kumar Mangalam Stadium

2 January 2017	Orissa	0–2	West Bengal	Bokaro Steel City
			77'; 80'	Stadium: Mohan Kumar Mangalam Stadium

=== Group B ===
Pos	Team	Pld	W	D	L	GF	GA	GD	Pts	Qualification
1	Railways	3	3	0	0	10	1	+9	9	Advance to Final Round
2	Jharkhand	3	1	1	1	3	3	0	4	
3	Sikkim	3	1	1	1	3	3	0	4	
4	Bihar	3	0	0	3	0	9	−9	0	

Rules for classification: 1) points; 2) goal difference; 3) goals scored; 4) head-to-head result.

28 December 2016	Jharkhand	0–0	Sikkim	Bokaro Steel City
				Stadium: Mohan Kumar Mangalam Stadium

28 December 2016	Railways	4–0	Bihar	Bokaro Steel City
				Stadium: Mohan Kumar Mangalam Stadium

30 December 2016	Sikkim	0–3	Railways	Bokaro Steel City
				Stadium: Mohan Kumar Mangalam Stadium

30 December 2016	Bihar	0–2	Jharkhand	Bokaro Steel City
				Stadium: Mohan Kumar Mangalam Stadium

1 January 2017	Sikkim	3–0	Bihar	Bokaro Steel City
				Stadium: Mohan Kumar Mangalam Stadium

1 January 2017	Jharkhand	1–3	Railways	Bokaro Steel City
				Stadium: Mohan Kumar Mangalam Stadium

== West Zone ==
=== Group A ===
Pos	Team	Pld	W	D	L	GF	GA	GD	Pts	Qualification
1	Goa	2	2	0	0	12	0	+12	6	Advance to Final Round
2	Madhya Pradesh	2	1	0	1	7	4	+3	3	
3	Daman & Diu	2	0	0	2	0	15	−15	0	

Rules for classification: 1) points; 2) goal difference; 3) goals scored; 4) head-to-head result.

3 January 2017	Madhya Pradesh	7–0	Daman & Diu	Waidhan
				Stadium: Rajmata Chunkumari Stadium

6 January 2017	Daman & Diu	0–8	Goa	Waidhan
				Stadium: Rajmata Chunkumari Stadium

7 January 2017	Goa	4–0	Madhya Pradesh	Waidhan
				Stadium: Rajmata Chunkumari Stadium

=== Group B ===
Pos	Team	Pld	W	D	L	GF	GA	GD	Pts	Qualification
1	Maharashtra	2	2	0	0	8	0	+8	6	Advance to Final Round
2	Rajasthan	2	1	0	1	1	4	−3	3	
3	Gujarat	2	0	0	2	0	5	−5	0	

Rules for classification: 1) points; 2) goal difference; 3) goals scored; 4) head-to-head result.

4 January 2017	Maharashtra	4–0	Rajasthan	Waidhan
				Stadium: Rajmata Chunkumari Stadium

6 January 2017	Rajasthan	1–0	Gujarat	Waidhan
				Stadium: Rajmata Chunkumari Stadium

8 January 2017	Gujarat	0–4	Maharashtra	Waidhan
		Report	Aaron D'Costa 2'; Shravan Shetty 16', 30'; Vaibhav Shirley 90+1'	Stadium: Rajmata Chunkumari Stadium

== NorthEast Zone santosh trophy team list 2016-17 ==
=== Group A ===
Pos	Team	Pld	W	D	L	GF	GA	GD	Pts	Qualification
1	Meghalaya	2	2	0	0	8	0	+8	6	Advance to Final Round
2	Assam	2	1	0	1	2	2	0	3	
3	Arunachal Pradesh	2	0	0	2	0	8	−8	0	

Rules for classification: 1) points; 2) goal difference; 3) goals scored; 4) head-to-head result.

5 January 2017	Meghalaya	6–0	Arunachal Pradesh	Shillong
				Stadium: Jawaharlal Nehru Stadium

7 January 2017	Assam	0–2	Meghalaya	Shillong
				Stadium: Jawaharlal Nehru Stadium

9 January 2017	Arunachal Pradesh	0–2	Assam	Shillong
				Stadium: Jawaharlal Nehru Stadium

=== Group B ===
Pos	Team	Pld	W	D	L	GF	GA	GD	Pts	Qualification
1	Mizoram	2	2	0	0	8	1	+7	6	Advance to Final Round
2	Manipur	2	1	0	1	5	2	+3	3	
3	Tripura	2	0	0	2	0	10	−10	0	

Updated to match(es) played on 4 January 2017. Source:
Rules for classification: 1) points; 2) goal difference; 3) goals scored; 4) head-to-head result.

4 January 2017	Mizoram	6–0	Tripura	Shillong
				Stadium: Jawaharlal Nehru Stadium

6 January 2017	Tripura	0–4	Manipur	Shillong
				Stadium: Jawaharlal Nehru Stadium

8 January 2017	Manipur	1–2	Mizoram	Shillong
				Stadium: Jawaharlal Nehru Stadium
