= 2017–18 Indian Women's League preliminary round =

Indian Women's League preliminary round
Tournament details
- Country: India
- Dates: 25 November – 8 December 2017
- Teams: 13

Tournament statistics
- Matches played: 31
- Goals scored: 146 (4.71 per match)

The 2017–18 Indian Women's League preliminary round is the qualifying round that decided the two teams out of the participating thirteen that to enter the final round of the Indian Women's League. The thirteen teams are split into two groups and the top-ranked team from each group will qualify for the final rounds.

== Teams ==
Group A	State/UT	Group B	State/UT
Sethu FC	Tamil Nadu	Chandney Sporting Club	West Bengal
Indira Gandhi AS&E	Pondicherry	United Warriors Sporting Club	Punjab
Capital Complex Sporting Club	Arunachal Pradesh	Hans Women’s Football Club	Delhi
Baroda Football Academy	Gujarat	Rush Soccer	Maharashtra
Rising Student Club	Odisha	KRYPHSA	Manipur
J&K State Sports Council	Jammu and Kashmir	Eastern Sporting Union	Manipur
		SAI Women Football Team	

== Group A ==
=== Table ===
Pos	Team	Pld	W	D	L	GF	GA	GD	Pts	Qualification
1	Rising Student Club	4	3	1	0	26	2	+24	10	Final round
2	Indira Gandhi AS&E	4	3	0	1	23	4	+19	9	Final round
3	Sethu FC	4	2	1	1	19	6	+13	7	Final round
4	J&K State Sports Council	4	1	0	3	2	12	−10	3	
5	Baroda Football Academy	4	0	0	4	0	46	−46	0	
6	Capital Complex Sporting Club	0	0	0	0	0	0	0	0	Withdrew (Note: Withdrew from the league due to unknown reasons.)

Source: AIFF
Rules for classification: 1) points; 2) goal difference; 3) goals scored; 4) head-to-head result .

=== Fixtures and results ===
25 November 2017
09:00 IST

Baroda Football Academy	0–16	Sethu FC
	Report

Rajarshi Shahu Stadium, Kolhapur

25 November 2017
02:00 IST

Rising Student Club	8–0	J&K State Sports Council
	Report

Rajarshi Shahu Stadium, Kolhapur

27 November 2017
IST

J&K State Sports Council	0–2	Sethu FC
	Report

Rajarshi Shahu Stadium, Kolhapur

27 November 2017
IST

Indira Gandhi AS&E	15–0	Baroda Football Academy
	Report

Rajarshi Shahu Stadium, Kolhapur

29 November 2017
IST

Baroda Football Academy	0–2	J&K State Sports Council
	Report

Rajarshi Shahu Stadium, Kolhapur

29 November 2017
IST

Rising Student Club	4–1	Indira Gandhi AS&E
	Report

Rajarshi Shahu Stadium, Kolhapur

1 December 2017
IST

Indira Gandhi AS&E	5–0	Sethu FC
	Report

Rajarshi Shahu Stadium, Kolhapur

1 December 2017
IST

Rising Student Club	13–0	Baroda Football Academy
	Report

Rajarshi Shahu Stadium, Kolhapur

3 December 2017
IST

Sethu FC	1–1	Rising Student Club
	Report

Rajarshi Shahu Stadium, Kolhapur

3 December 2017
IST

Indira Gandhi AS&E	2–0	J&K State Sports Council
	Report

Rajarshi Shahu Stadium, Kolhapur

== Group B ==
=== Table ===
Pos	Team	Pld	W	D	L	GF	GA	GD	Pts	Qualification
1	Eastern Sporting Union	6	5	1	0	20	2	+18	16	Final round
2	KRYPHSA	6	4	1	1	12	5	+7	13	Final round
3	United Warriors Sporting Club	6	4	0	2	15	10	+5	12	
4	Chandney Sporting Club	6	2	1	3	8	15	−7	7	
5	Hans Women’s Football Club	6	1	2	3	7	11	−4	5	
6	Rush Soccer	6	1	1	4	5	14	−9	4	Final round
7	SAI Women′s Football Team	6	1	0	5	2	19	−17	3	

Source: AIFF
Rules for classification: 1) points; 2) goal difference; 3) goals scored; 4) head-to-head result .

=== Fixtures and results ===
26 November 2017
09:00 IST

Hans Women’s Football Club	4–0	SAI Women′s Football Team
	Report

Rajarshi Shahu Stadium, Kolhapur

26 November 2017
IST

United Warriors Sporting Club	1–5	KRYPHSA
	Report

Rajarshi Shahu Stadium, Kolhapur

26 November 2017
IST

Rush Soccer	0–2	Eastern Sporting Union
	Report

Rajarshi Shahu Stadium, Kolhapur

28 November 2017
IST

Chandney Sporting Club	3–0	SAI Women′s Football Team
	Report

Rajarshi Shahu Stadium, Kolhapur

28 November 2017
IST

United Warriors Sporting Club	3–0	Hans Women’s Football Club
	Report

Rajarshi Shahu Stadium, Kolhapur

28 November 2017
IST

KRYPHSA	4–0	Rush Soccer
	Report

Rajarshi Shahu Stadium, Kolhapur

30 November 2017
IST

Eastern Sporting Union	2–0	United Warriors Sporting Club
	Report

Rajarshi Shahu Stadium, Kolhapur

30 November 2017
IST

SAI Women′s Football Team	0–5	KRYPHSA
	Report

Rajarshi Shahu Stadium, Kolhapur

30 November 2017
IST

Hans Women’s Football Club	1–1	Chandney Sporting Club
	Report

Rajarshi Shahu Stadium, Kolhapur

2 December 2017
IST

Eastern Sporting Union	6–0	Chandney Sporting Club
	Report

Rajarshi Shahu Stadium, Kolhapur

2 December 2017
IST

Rush Soccer	0–2	SAI Women′s Football Team
	Report

Rajarshi Shahu Stadium, Kolhapur

2 December 2017
IST

KRYPHSA	3–1	Hans Women’s Football Club
	Report

Rajarshi Shahu Stadium, Kolhapur

4 December 2017
IST

Hans Women’s Football Club	1–4	Eastern Sporting Union
	Report

Rajarshi Shahu Stadium, Kolhapur

4 December 2017
IST

Rush Soccer	2–5	United Warriors Sporting Club
	Report

Rajarshi Shahu Stadium, Kolhapur

4 December 2017
IST

Chandney Sporting Club	2–1	KRYPHSA
	Report

Rajarshi Shahu Stadium, Kolhapur

6 December 2017
IST

SAI Women′s Football Team	0–2	United Warriors Sporting Club
	Report

Rajarshi Shahu Stadium, Kolhapur

6 December 2017
IST

Chandney Sporting Club	1–3	Rush Soccer
	Report

Rajarshi Shahu Stadium, Kolhapur

6 December 2017
IST

Eastern Sporting Union	1–1	KRYPHSA
	Report

Rajarshi Shahu Stadium, Kolhapur

8 December 2017
IST

United Warriors Sporting Club	4–1	Chandney Sporting Club

Rajarshi Shahu Stadium, Kolhapur

8 December 2017
IST

SAI Women′s Football Team	0–5	Eastern Sporting Union

Rajarshi Shahu Stadium, Kolhapur

8 December 2017
IST

Rush Soccer	0–0	Hans Women’s Football Club

Rajarshi Shahu Stadium, Kolhapur
