= Khasbag Wrestling Stadium =

Stadium in Kolhapur, Maharashtra, India

Coordinates: 16°41′33″N 74°13′34″E

Rajarshi Shahu Khasbag Wrestling Stadium
- Khasbag
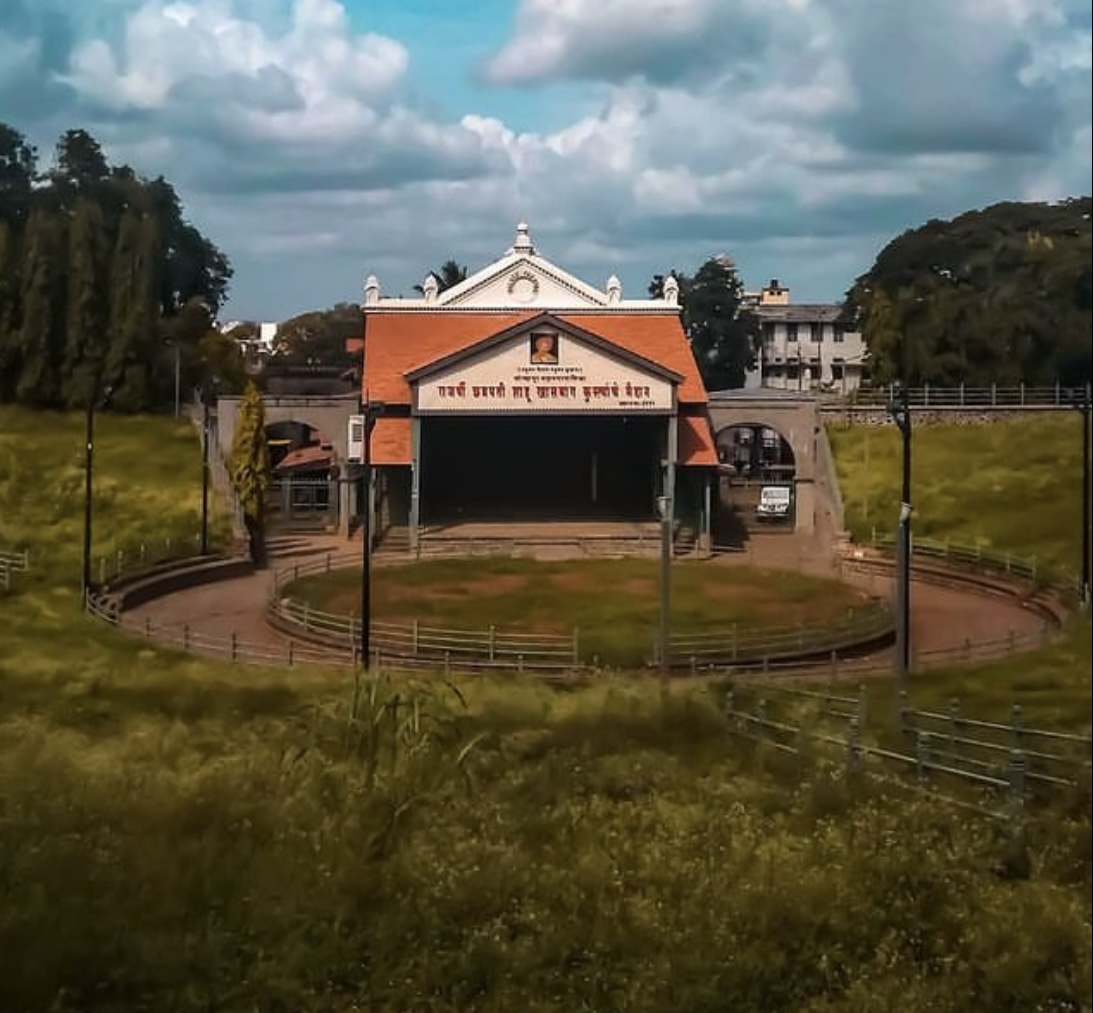
- Interactive map of Rajarshi Shahu Khasbag Wrestling Stadium
- Full name: Rajarshi Shahu Khasbaug Maidan
- Former names: Khasbaug Maidan
- Location: Kolhapur, Maharashtra, India
- Owner: Kolhapur Municipal Corporation
- Operator: Kolhapur Municipal Corporation
- Capacity: 30,000
- Surface: Malt

Khasbag Stadium is a national wrestling stadium in Kolhapur city, Maharashtra, India. This is a biggest wrestling stadium in India. The stadium was built in the time of Rajarshi Shahu Maharaj and is almost a hundred-year-old stadium. And this is heritage site also.

Khasbag stadium, also known as Khasbaug Maidan (Ground), is 1 kilometre South-East to Mahalaxmi Temple and 8 Kilometers South-West to Central Bus Stand of Kolhapur. The structure flaunts a seating arrangement for about 30,000 people around a Wrestling Ring also called "Houd". Special seating is available for the members of the royal family of Kolhapur on the east side of the wrestling ring.

In 2012, it was the venue for the '46th Hind Kesari wrestling championship'. It was held to mark the centenary of Khasbag wrestling arena.

== See also ==
- Rajarshi Shahu Stadium
- Shri Chhatrapati Shivaji Stadium
