= Roy Henzell Oval =

Cricket ground in Caloundra, Queensland

Coordinates: 26°48′03.45″S 153°07′34.79″E

Ground information
- Location: Caloundra, Australia
- Establishment: 1981 (first recorded match)
- Capacity: 10,000

Team information
Queensland	(1993)
- As of 21 October 2011; Source: Ground profile

Roy Henzell Oval is a cricket ground in Caloundra, Queensland, Australia. The first recorded match on the ground came in 1981 when Queensland Country played the touring West Indians. It held its only first-class match in 1993 when Queensland played the touring England A side, with the match ending in a draw. Three Youth One Day Internationals were played there in 2007 between Australia Under-19s and Pakistan Under-19.

== See also ==
- List of sports venues named after individuals
