= Shri Chhatrapati Shivaji Stadium =

Multi-purpose stadium in Kolhapur, India

Coordinates: 16°41′35″N 74°13′43″E

Ground information
- Location: Kolhapur, Maharashtra
- Country: India
- Establishment: 1952
- Capacity: 50,000
- Owner: Kolhapur Cricket Association

Team information
Maharashtra cricket team

Shri Chhatrapati Shivaji Stadium or Kolhapur Cricket Association Ground is a multi-purpose stadium in Kolhapur, Maharashtra. The stadium has hosted many of first-class and List A matches for Maharashtra cricket team. It also hosted the Santosh Trophy matches. The stadium is owned and managed by Kolhapur Cricket Association. It is named after a great Maratha warrior Shivaji who ruled Maharashtra for many years. Till date the stadium has hosted 14 first-class matches from 1952 to 2006 as well as one List A match in 1990 when Maharashtra cricket team took on in 18 run defeat over Wills' XI.

== See also ==
- Rajarshi Shahu Stadium
- Khasbag Wrestling Stadium
