= Maharaja Lakshman Sen Memorial College Ground =

Cricket ground in Sundar Nagar, India

Coordinates: 31°30′28.37″N 76°53′06.52″E

- Interactive map of Maharaja Lakshman Sen Memorial College Ground

Ground information
- Location: Sundar Nagar, India
- Country: India
- Establishment: 1991 (first recorded match)

Team information
Himachal Pradesh	(1997)
- As of 29 October 2011; Source: Ground profile

Maharaja Lakshman Sen Memorial College Ground is a cricket ground in Sundar Nagar, Himachal Pradesh, India. The first recorded match held on the ground came in 1991 when Himachal Pradesh Under-19s played Delhi Under-19s. The ground later held a List A match in 1997 when Himachal Pradesh played the Services in the 1997/98 Ranji Trophy one-day competition. Following this match, a first-class match was played there between the two sides in the Ranji Trophy.
