= Chhatrapati Shahu Stadium =

Historic football stadium in Kolhapur, India

Coordinates: 16°41′35″N 74°13′49″E

- Shahu Maidan
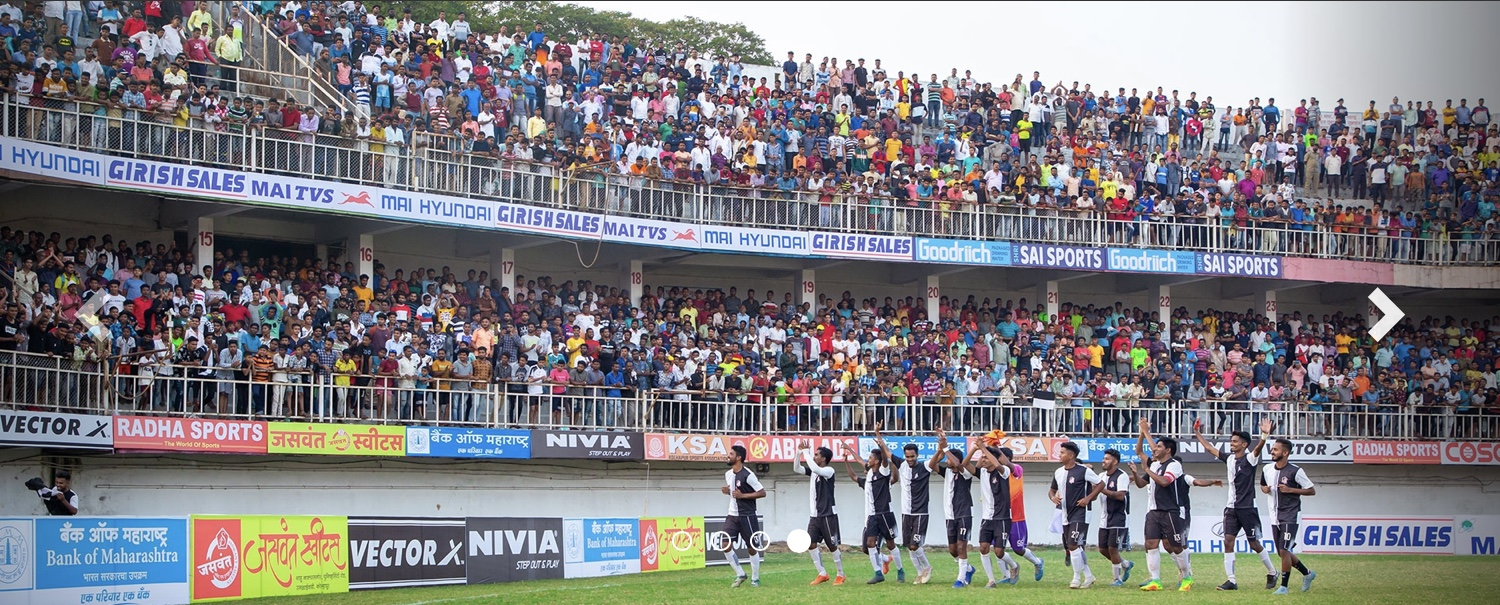
- Interactive map of Chhatrapati Shahu Stadium
- Location: Subhash Road, Kolhapur, Maharashtra, India
- Owner: Government of Maharashtra
- Operator: Kolhapur Sports Association
- Capacity: 18000
- Surface: Grass
- Field size: 106 m × 70 m (348 ft × 230 ft)

Construction
- Opened: 1960

Tenants
- All Kolhapur District Football Clubs; Maharashtra (Santosh Trophy Team)

Chhatrapati Shahu Football Stadium is a historic football stadium in Kolhapur, Maharashtra, India.

== Name ==
The stadium is named after Chhatrapati Shahu Maharaj, the Maharaja of the Indian princely state of Kolhapur Who has built this Stadium.

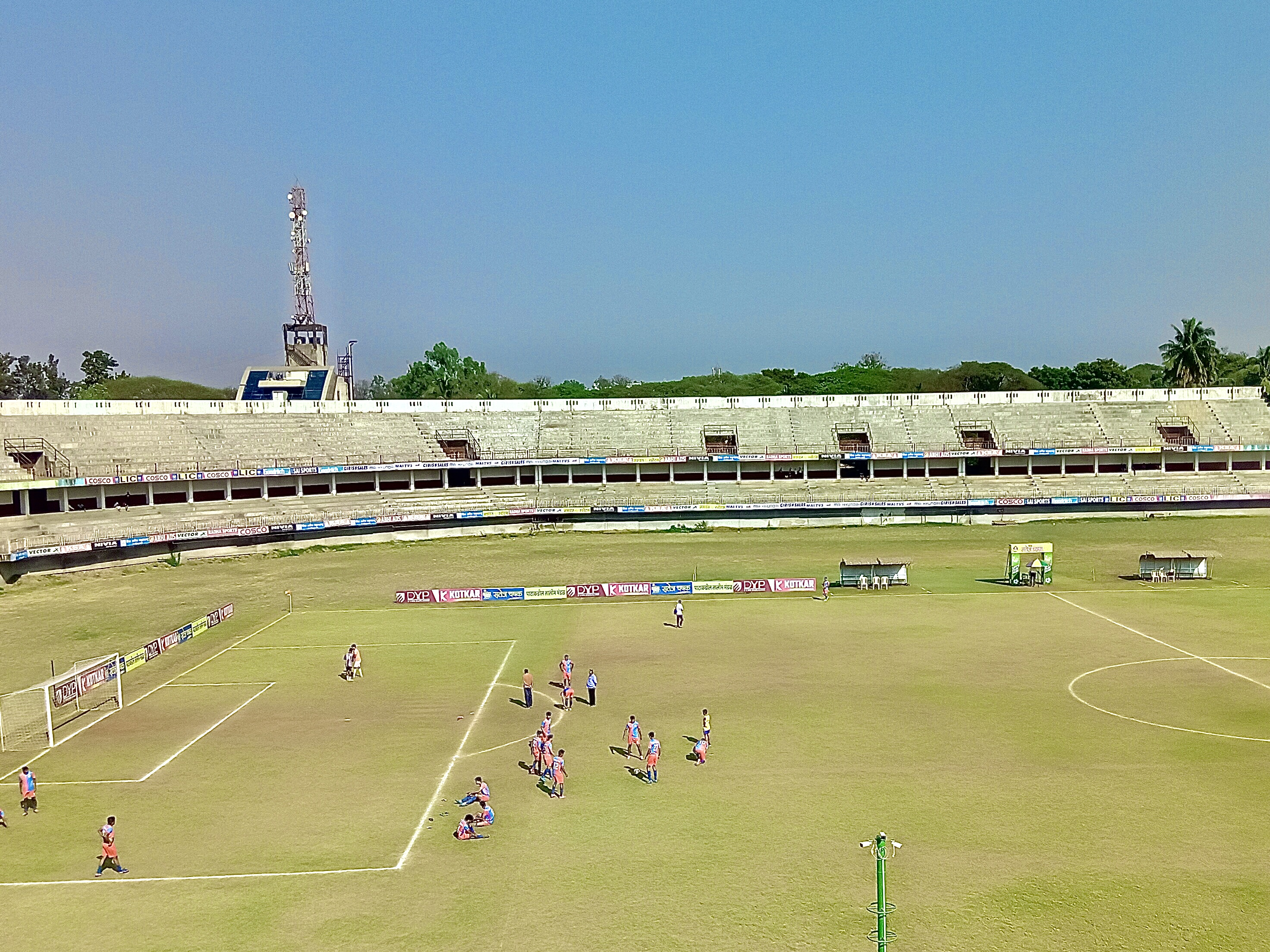
Shahu Stadium in Kolhapur

== Usage ==
Santosh Trophy matches of 2022–23 season took place here. The clubs of KSA district leagues use the stadium. The leagues are conducted by the Kolhapur Sports Association. It also serves as the home stadium for FC Kolhapur City.

== See also ==
- Shri Chhatrapati Shivaji Stadium
- Khasbag Wrestling Stadium
