= Mohan Kumar Mangalam Stadium =

Sports stadium in Bokaro Steel City, Jharkhand, India

Mohan Kumar Manglam Stadium
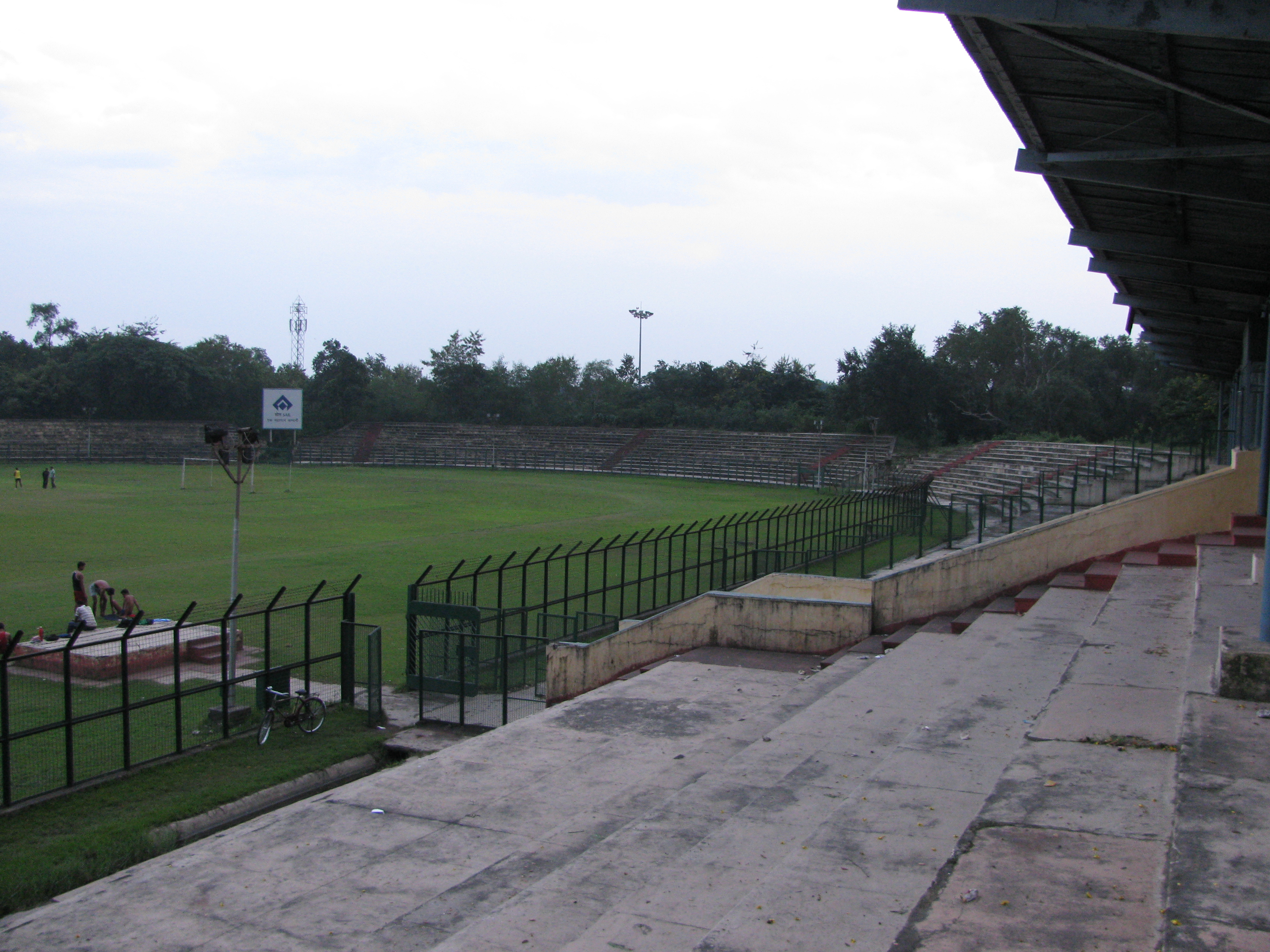
- Interactive map of Mohan Kumar Manglam Stadium

Ground information
- Location: Bokaro Steel City
- Country: India
- Coordinates: 23°40′3″N 86°9′23″E
- Capacity: 30,000
- Owner: Bokaro Steel Plant
- Operator: Bokaro Steel Plant
- End names
- n/a

Team information
Jharkhand FC	(2017-)
- As of February 2013

Mohan Kumar Mangalam Stadium is a sports stadium located in Bokaro Steel City, Jharkhand, India. The stadium is situated in heart of the city, in sector 4. The stadium is managed by Bokaro Steel Plant and hosts sporting events in city. The capacity of the stadium is 30,000 with a corporate gallery for VIPs. The stadium hosts National and State football leagues. It has an athletics track. Jharkhand FC will host I-League 2nd Division games.

The stadium is the headquarters of SAIL Football Academy. The SAIL Football Academy students' team has three Subroto Cups to its credit.
