= Sundar Nagar =

Town in Himachal Pradesh, India

- Town
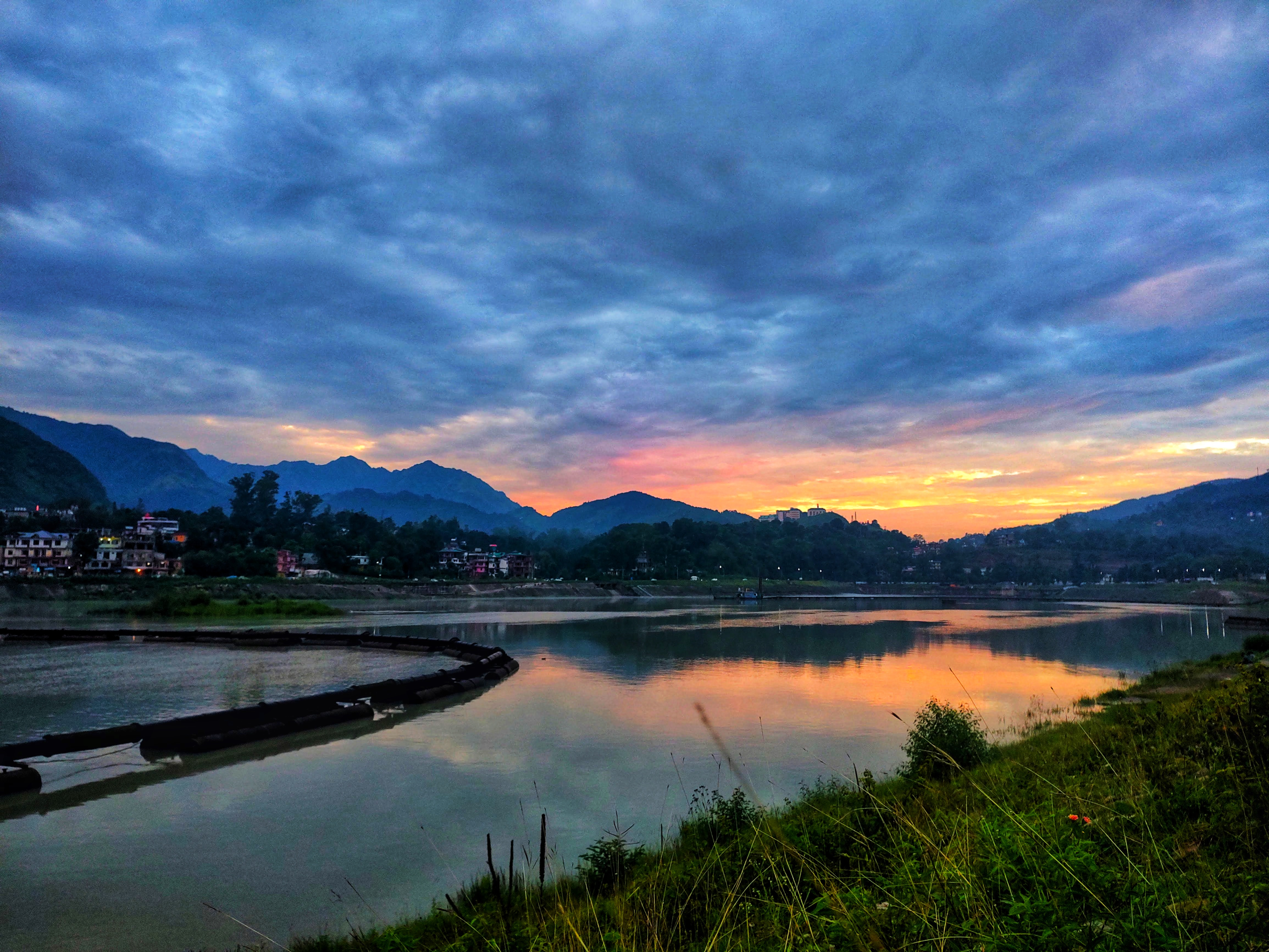
- Sunder Nagar Lake
- Nickname: Suket
- Location in Himachal Pradesh, India Sundar Nagar (India)
- Coordinates: 31.53°N 76.88°E
- Country: India
- State: Himachal Pradesh
- District: Mandi

Government
  - Type: Union government

Area
  - Total: 432 km^{2} (167 sq mi)
- Elevation: 900 m (3,000 ft)

Population (2011)
  - Total: 24,344
  - Rank: 8 in HP
  - Density: 56.4/km^{2} (146/sq mi)

Languages
  - Official: Hindi
  - Native: Mandeali
- Time zone: UTC+5:30 (IST)
- PIN: 175018
- Telephone code: 91-1907
- Vehicle registration: HP- HP-31
- Climate: Cwa
- Website: https://hpmandi.nic.in/tourist-place/sundernagar/

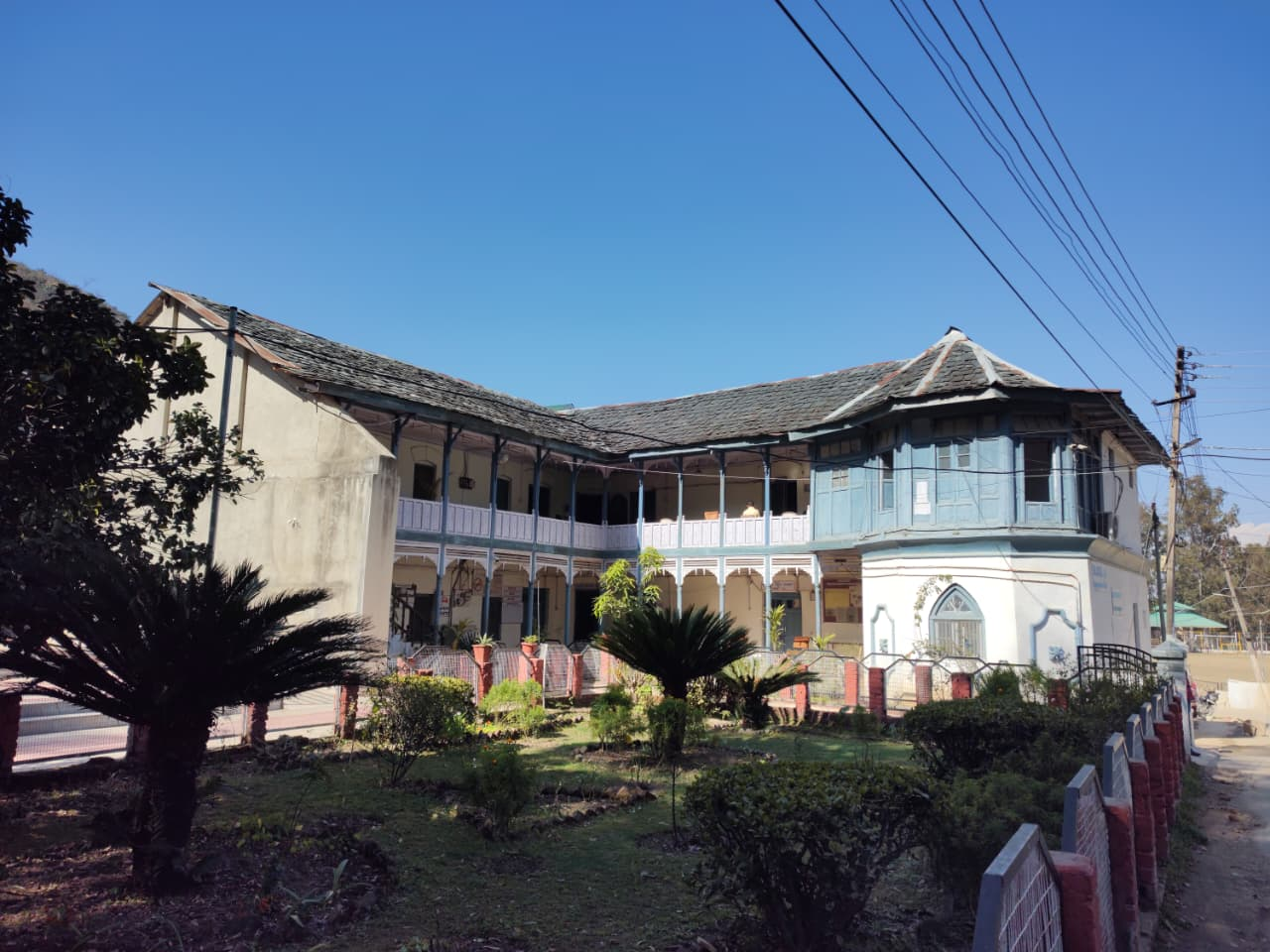
MLSM College Sunder Nagar

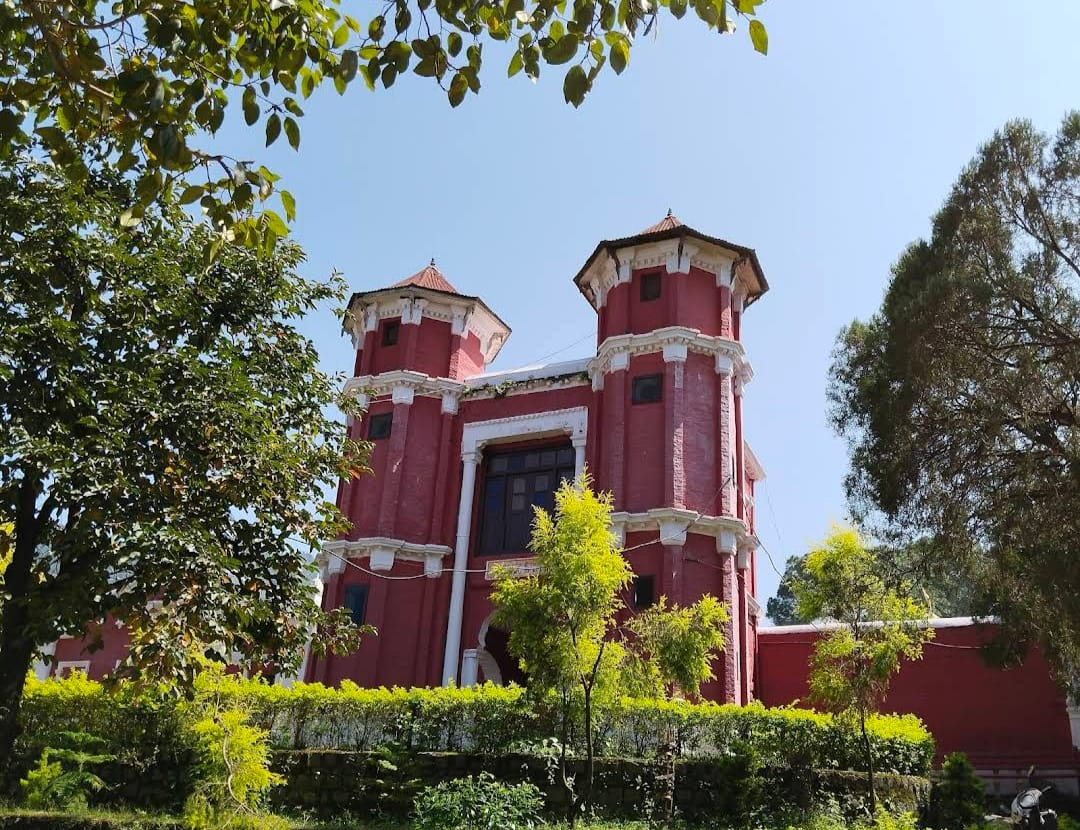
Mahamaya Temple Sunder Nagar

Sundar Nagar (also spelled as Sundernagar) is a town and a municipal council in Mandi district in the Indian state of Himachal Pradesh. It was formerly a princely state, known as Suket.

== History ==
Sunder Nagar was formerly the seat of princely state, known as Suket State.

== Geo-climatic ==
=== Geography ===
Sundar Nagar is located in Mandi, Himachal Pradesh, India. Its geographical coordinates are 31° 32' 0" North, 76° 53' 0" East and its original name (with diacritics) is Sundar Nagar. The city has an average elevation of 900 metres (3,000 ft).

=== Climate ===
Climate data for Arogyavaram (1991–2020, extremes 1999–present)
Month	Jan	Feb	Mar	Apr	May	Jun	Jul	Aug	Sep	Oct	Nov	Dec	Year
Record high °C (°F)	27.7 (81.9)	30.5 (86.9)	35.0 (95.0)	39.9 (103.8)	41.4 (106.5)	42.1 (107.8)	39.2 (102.6)	35.1 (95.2)	35.1 (95.2)	33.6 (92.5)	31.2 (88.2)	26.8 (80.2)	42.1 (107.8)
Mean daily maximum °C (°F)	18.0 (64.4)	20.4 (68.7)	25.4 (77.7)	30.5 (86.9)	34.2 (93.6)	33.9 (93.0)	31.0 (87.8)	30.3 (86.5)	30.5 (86.9)	29.0 (84.2)	24.6 (76.3)	20.1 (68.2)	27.3 (81.1)
Mean daily minimum °C (°F)	2.7 (36.9)	5.4 (41.7)	9.0 (48.2)	13.0 (55.4)	16.9 (62.4)	20.0 (68.0)	21.9 (71.4)	21.6 (70.9)	18.8 (65.8)	11.9 (53.4)	6.3 (43.3)	2.7 (36.9)	12.5 (54.5)
Record low °C (°F)	−2.7 (27.1)	−1.9 (28.6)	−0.4 (31.3)	0.5 (32.9)	9.6 (49.3)	11.4 (52.5)	16.5 (61.7)	15.1 (59.2)	10.2 (50.4)	5.4 (41.7)	1.0 (33.8)	−2.4 (27.7)	−2.7 (27.1)
Average rainfall mm (inches)	62.7 (2.47)	76.6 (3.02)	69.4 (2.73)	48.9 (1.93)	82.0 (3.23)	187.2 (7.37)	346.1 (13.63)	337.9 (13.30)	138.7 (5.46)	24.0 (0.94)	12.2 (0.48)	25.3 (1.00)	1,411 (55.55)
Average rainy days	4.2	5.4	5.1	3.8	6.3	9.8	15.3	13.9	7.1	1.4	1.1	1.6	75.2
Average relative humidity (%) (at 17:30 IST)	56	50	42	37	38	52	74	78	70	57	57	59	56
Source: India Meteorological Department

== Demography ==
According to 2011 Census of India, the town's population stood at 24,344. Males constitute 53% of the population and females 47%. Sundar Nagar has an average literacy rate of 82%, higher than the national average of 59.5%. Male literacy is 85%, and Female literacy is 78%. In Sundar Nagar, 10% of the population is under 6 years of age.

== Transport ==
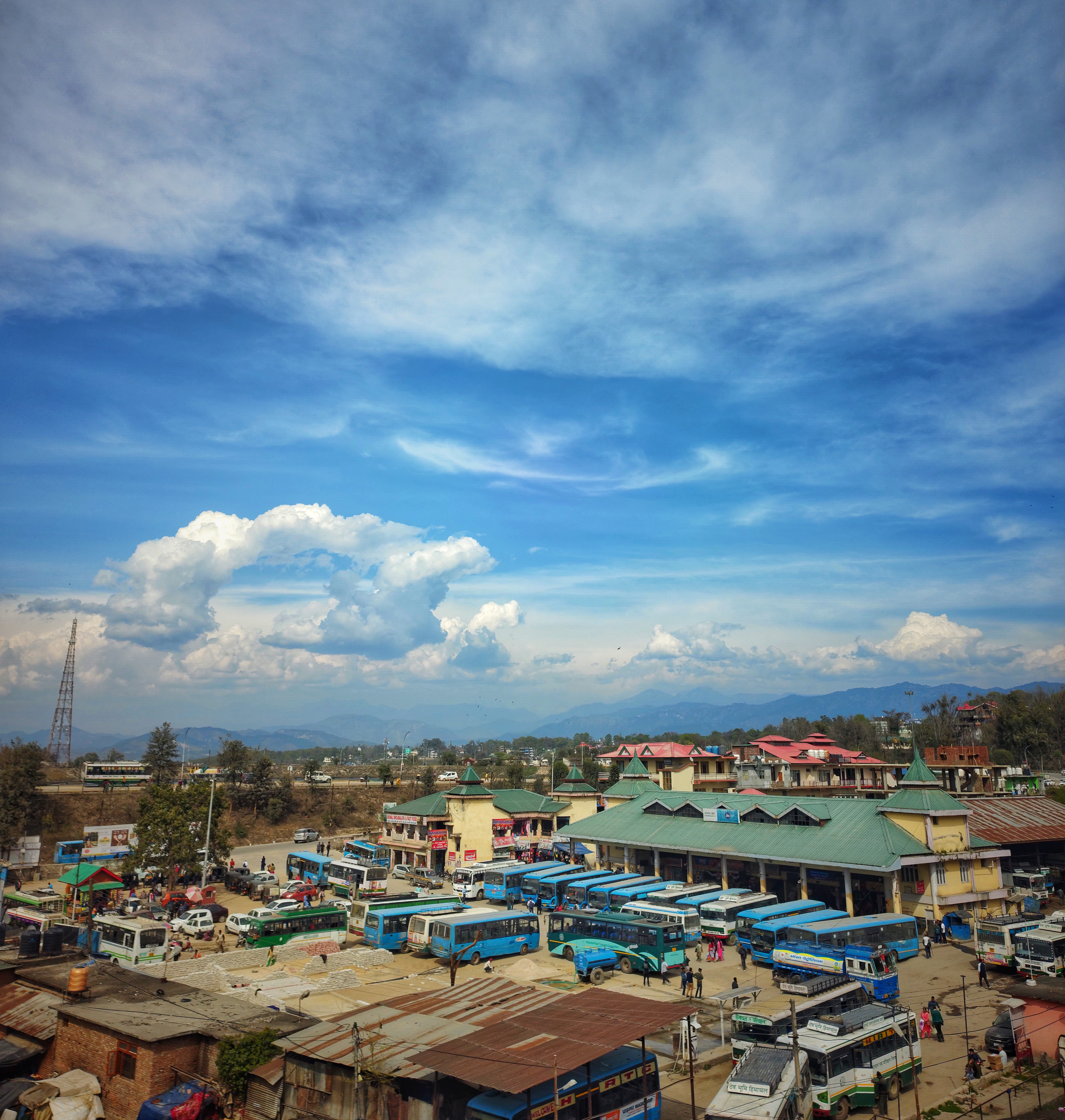
Sunder Nagar Bus Stand

=== Airport ===
The nearest airport is Bhuntar, near Kullu, which is about 82 km from the town.

A greenfield "Sundar Nagar International Airport", in Balh Valley, has been in planning since long. In 2013, the Government of Himachal Pradesh (GoHP) had sent a proposal to the Government of India (GoI) to construct this airport, which was estimated to cost Rs 700 crore at 2013 prices. The proposed airport will have facilities for the wide-bodied larger aircraft. The techno-economic feasibility study of the identified site were already completed. The site, near Sunder Nagar, lies nearly in the center of the state. The state has three existing small airports at Kangra (146 km (91 mi) northwest), Kullu (79 km (49 mi) north) and Shimla (125 km (78 mi) southeast). A satellite survey of the site was conducted in 2018 and 698 acres land in the Ner Chowk area in Balh Valley was identified. In 2019, GoI had granted the approval for the airport, Airports Authority of India (AAI) was preparing a "detailed project report" (DPR) and GoHP was speeding up the land acquisition process.

=== Rail and roads ===
The nearest broad-gauge railway station is Kiratpur Sahib which is about 105 km. Another broad-gauge railhead is at Pathankot, a distance of 210 km. From Pathankot, the narrow gauge railway connects to Joginder Nagar which is 80-km from Sundar Nagar.

=== Roads ===
Sundar Nagar is situated on NH-154 (previously named NH21), 22 km from Mandi, and is well-connected by road to other places. Frequent bus services are available from Chandigarh, Delhi, Shimla, and Jammu for Sundar Nagar. The main bus stand is just above an open playing field, where the National Highway 21 continues along the left bank of the river to Pandoh.

From	Distance
Delhi	416 km
Manali	125 km
Shimla	140 km
Joginder Nagar	85 km
Chandigarh	175 km
Dharamshala	218 km
Palampur	115 km
Mandi	25 km

== Public facilities ==
=== e-Governance Services Delivery Center ===
A "Common Services Center" (CSC) or Department of Electronics and Information Technology of Government Of India is near New Manali Sweets & Bakers, HRTC Bus Stand on NH-21 Chandigarh-Mandi-Manali route.

=== Education ===
Government colleges:

- Jawaharlal Nehru Government Engineering College
- Shri Lal Bahadur Shastri Government Medical College
- Government Polytechnic College, Sundernagar
- Government Sanskrit College, Sundernagar
- Maharaja Laxman Sen Memorial College

Private colleges:

- Gayatri College of Education
- Himalayan College of Education
- Jagriti College
- Nandini College of Nursing
- Shri Sai School of Nursing
- Abhilashi Group of Institution
- Sirda Group of Institution

Schools (Public and Private sectors)

- King George Royal Public School, Sunder Nagar
- St. Mary's High School, Sunder Nagar
- D.A.V Public School, Sunder Nagar
- Senior Secondary Boys School, Sunder Nagar

== Places to Visit ==
=== Sunder Nagar Lake ===
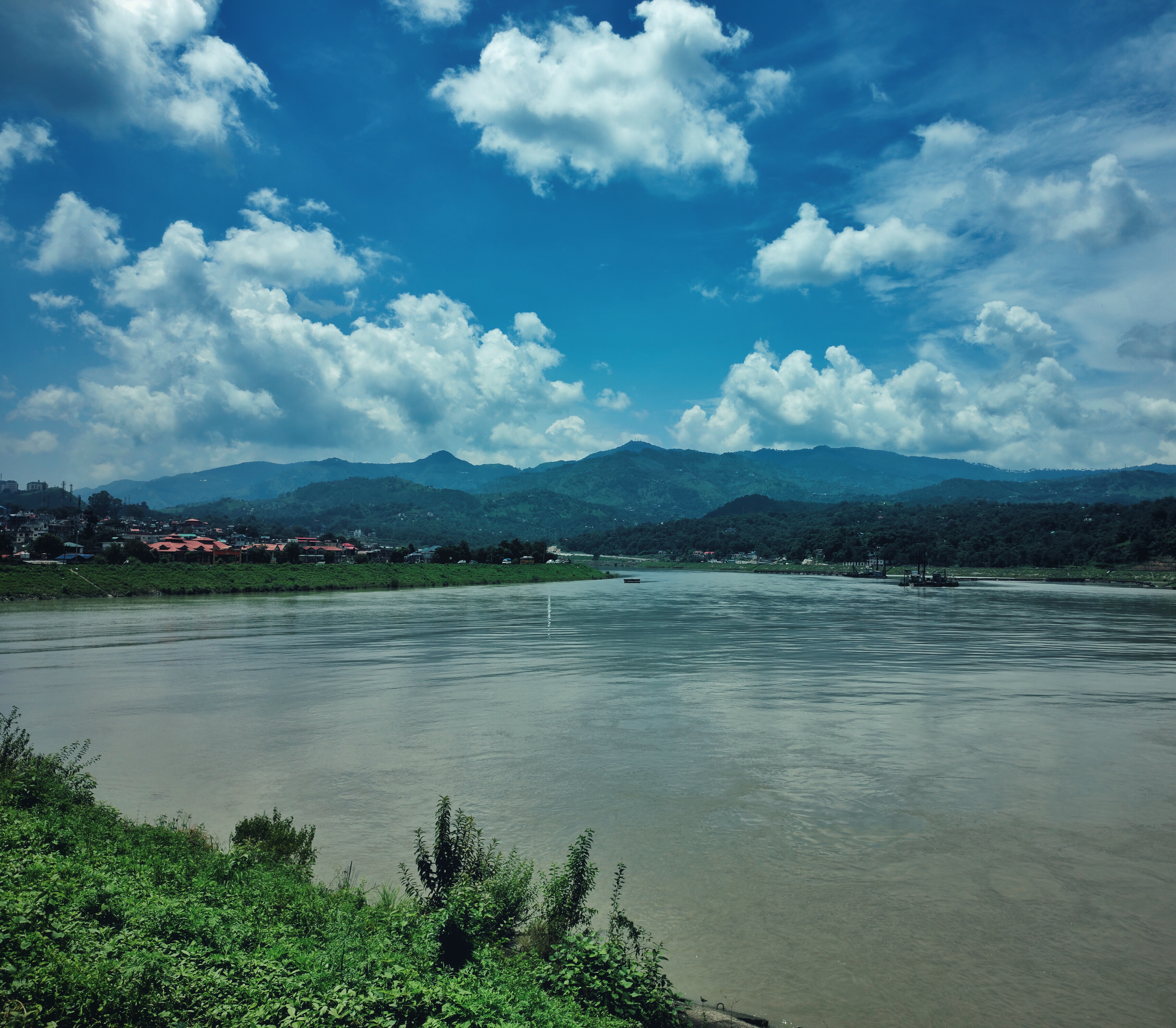
Sunder Nagar Lake

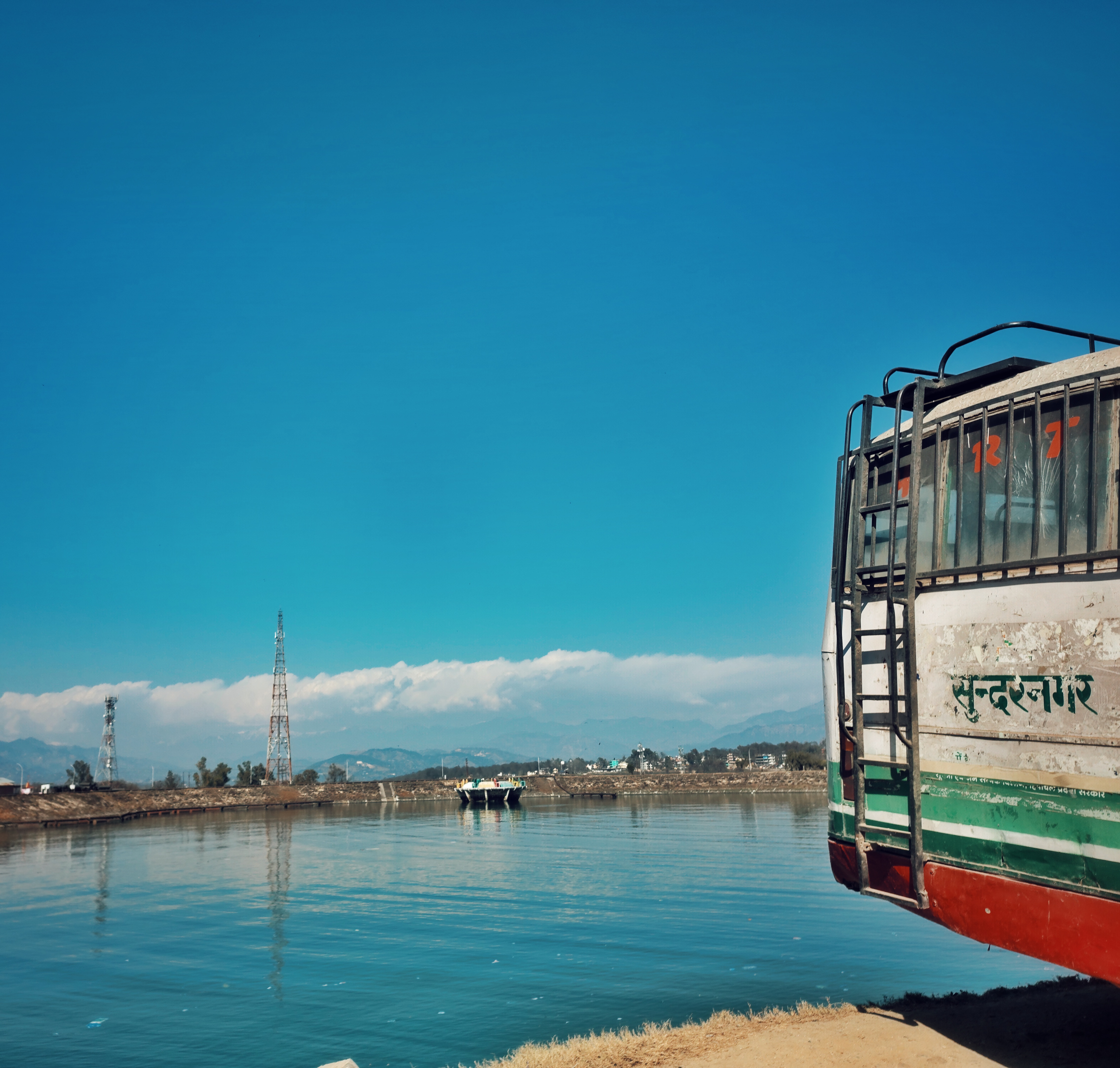
Sunder Nagar Lake View with HRTC Sunder Nagar Depot

=== Sukhdev Vatika ( Park ) ===
Sukhdev Vatika

Old Structure of Suket near Lalit Chowk
