= 1997 Women's Cricket World Cup =

Cricket tournament in India

- Dates: 9 – 29 December 1997
- Administrator: International Women's Cricket Council
- Cricket format: Women's One Day International
- Tournament format(s): Round robin and Knockout
- Host: India
- Champions: Australia (4th title)
- Runners-up: New Zealand
- Participants: 11
- Matches: 33
- Most runs: (New Zealand) Debbie Hockley (456)
- Most wickets: (New Zealand) Katrina Keenan (13)

The 1997 Women's Cricket World Cup, also known as the Hero Honda Women's World Cup, was the sixth edition of the Women's Cricket World Cup, held in India. With 32 matches involving a record 11 teams across 25 cricket grounds, England, Australia, New Zealand and India reached the semi-finals, with Australia and New Zealand progressing to the final match, which was played on 29 December 1997. Australia defeated New Zealand by five wickets to win their fourth championship title.

The 1997 World Cup also set a number of records for the tournament. In their match against Denmark, Australia scored the highest team score in a World Cup, 412/3, and achieved the largest winning margin in a World Cup, 363 runs. In the same match, Australia's Belinda Clark scored 229*, the highest individual score in a World Cup. Australia also bowled out Pakistan for 27 in 82 balls, the shortest completed innings in a Women's One Day International.

== Venues ==
1997 Women's Cricket World Cup venues
Venue	City	Matches	Map
Eden Gardens	Kolkata	1	Venue locations within India
Eklavya Sports Stadium	Agra	1	Venue locations within India
Feroz Shah Kotla	Delhi	1	Venue locations within India
Gangothri Glades Cricket Ground	Mysore	1	Venue locations within India
Gymkhana Ground	Secunderabad	1	Venue locations within India
Harbaksh Stadium	Delhi	2	Venue locations within India
Indira Gandhi Stadium	Vijayawada	1	Venue locations within India
Jamia Millia Islamia University Ground	New Delhi	1	Venue locations within India
K.D.Singh Babu Stadium	Lucknow	1	Venue locations within India
Karnail Singh Stadium	Delhi	1	Venue locations within India
Lal Bahadur Shastri Stadium	Hyderabad	2	Venue locations within India
M.Chinnaswamy Stadium	Bangalore	1	Venue locations within India
MA Chidambaram Stadium	Chennai	2	Venue locations within India
Middle Income Group Club Ground	Mumbai	1	Venue locations within India
Moin-ul-Haq Stadium	Patna	1	Venue locations within India
Nahar Singh Stadium	Faridabad	1	Venue locations within India
Mohan Meakins Cricket Stadium	Ghaziabad	1	Venue locations within India
Nehru Stadium	Gurgaon	1	Venue locations within India
Nehru Stadium	Indore	1	Venue locations within India
Nehru Stadium	Pune	2	Venue locations within India
Punjab C.A. Stadium	Chandigarh	1	Venue locations within India
Reliance Stadium	Vadodara	2	Venue locations within India
Sector 16 Stadium	Chandigarh	2	Venue locations within India
Vidarbha C.A. Ground	Nagpur	1	Venue locations within India
Wankhede Stadium	Mumbai	1	Venue locations within India
Inderjit Singh Bindra Stadium	Mohali	1	Venue locations within India
Gymkhana Ground	Hyderabad	1	Venue locations within India

== Group stage ==
The competition began with twenty-five matches between 11 teams, the highest participation of any Women's Cricket World Cup to date. After these matches, Australia, England, the Netherlands, Sri Lanka, India, South Africa, Ireland and New Zealand reached the quarter finals stage, while Denmark, Pakistan and the West Indies were eliminated. The first three matches of this stage were rained off without a ball being bowled, due to torrential storms on 9 and 10 December.

=== Group A ===
==== Table ====
Team	Pld	W	L	T	NR	Pts
Australia	5	4	0	0	1	27
England	5	4	1	0	0	24
South Africa	5	3	2	0	0	18
Ireland	5	2	2	0	1	15
Denmark	5	1	4	0	0	6
Pakistan	5	0	5	0	0	0

==== Fixtures ====
10 December 1997
Scorecard

Australia	v	Ireland

Match Abandoned
M. A. Chidambaram Stadium, Chennai
Umpires: S. V. Ramani and T. R. Kashyappan

- No toss.
- No play possible due to rain.
- Points: Australia Women 3, Ireland Women 3

10 December 1997
Scorecard

Pakistan; 65 (30.4 overs)	v	Denmark; 66/2 (29.3 overs)
Maliha Hussain 13 (52); Susanne Nielsen 4/9 (10 overs)		Malene Iversen 21 (73); Kiran Baluch 2/13 (7 overs)

Denmark Women won by 8 wickets
Gangotri Glades Cricket Ground, Mysore
Umpires: Shavir Tarapore and V Mouli
Player of the match: Susanne Nielsen (Den)

- Denmark Women won the toss and elected to field.
- Sadia Butt, Asma Farzand, Shazia Hassan, Ruksana Khan, Nazia Nazir and Nazia Sadiq (Pak) all made their WODI debuts.
- Points: Denmark Women 6, Pakistan Women 0

10 December 1997
Scorecard

England; 94/7 (20 overs)	v	South Africa; 87/9 (20 overs)
Charlotte Edwards 38 (50); Kim Price 2/17 (4 overs)		Kim Price 15* (12); Charlotte Edwards 3/15 (3 overs)

England Women won by 7 runs
Lal Bahadur Shastri Stadium, Hyderabad
Umpires: Chandra Kumar and O. Krishna
Player of the match: Charlotte Edwards (Eng)

- South Africa Women won the toss and elected to field.
- Match reduced to 20 overs per side due to rain.
- Elizabeth Akehurst (SA) made her WODI debut.
- Points: England Women 6, South Africa Women 0

12 December 1997
Scorecard

South Africa; 163/9 (50 overs)	v	Australia; 167/0 (28.5 overs)
Linda Olivier 51 (92); Charmaine Mason 2/22 (10 overs)		Belinda Clark 93* (98)

Australia Women won by 10 wickets
M. Chinnaswamy Stadium, Bangalore
Umpires: Sadanand Viswanath and Salemohammad Yusuf
Player of the match: Belinda Clark (Aus)

- South Africa Women won the toss and elected to bat.
- Belinda Dermota (SA) made her WODI debut.
- Points: Australia Women 6, South Africa Women 0

12 December 1997
Scorecard

Denmark; 56/7 (23 overs)	v	Ireland; 57/1 (19.1 overs)
Jette Philipsen 10 (43); Barbara McDonald 3/12 (5 overs)		Nikki Squire 21* (62); Janni Jonsson 1/18 (5 overs)

Ireland Women won by 9 wickets
M. A. Chidambaram Stadium, Chennai
Umpires: KR Shankar and S Balachandran
Player of the match: Barbara McDonald (Ire)

- Denmark Women won the toss and elected to bat.
- Match reduced to 23 overs per side due to rain.
- Heather Whelan (Ire) made her WODI debut.
- Points: Ireland Women 6, Denmark Women 0

12 December 1997
Scorecard

England; 376/2 (50 overs)	v	Pakistan; 146/3 (47 overs)
Barbara Daniels 142* (103); Shaiza Khan 1/64 (9 overs)		Sharmeen Khan 41 (68); Melissa Reynard 2/36 (10 overs)

England Women won by 230 runs
Indira Gandhi Stadium, Vijayawada
Umpires: G. A. Pratapkumar and Surya Prakash Rao
Player of the match: Jan Brittin (Eng)

- Pakistan Women won the toss and elected to field.
- Pakistan Women were penalised three overs for a slow over rate.
- Deebah Sherazi (Pak) made her WODI debut.
- Points: England Women 6, Pakistan Women 0

14 December 1997
Scorecard

Pakistan; 27 (13.4 overs)	v	Australia; 28/1 (6.1 overs)
Kiran Ahtazaz 11* (12); Olivia Magno 3/0 (1.4 overs)		Michelle Goszko 18* (25)

Australia Women won by 9 wickets
Lal Bahadur Shastri Stadium, Hyderabad
Umpires: K. Parthasarathy and Ramesh Jadhav
Player of the match: Olivia Magno (Aus)

- Pakistan Women won the toss and elected to bat.
- Kiran Ahtazaz (Pak) made her WODI debut.
- Points: Australia Women 6, Pakistan Women 0
- Pakistan Women's 27 all out in 82 balls is the shortest completed innings in a Women's One Day International.

14 December 1997
Scorecard

England; 301/4 (50 overs)	v	Denmark; 107/7 (50 overs)
Helen Plimmer 87 (104); Susanne Nielsen 2/51 (10 overs)		Karin Mikkelsen 39* (82); Clare Taylor 2/12 (10 overs)

England Women won by 194 runs
Gymkhana Ground, Hyderabad
Umpires: Ivaturi Shivram and V. K. Ramaswamy
Player of the match: Helen Plimmer (Eng)

- Denmark Women won the toss and elected to field.
- Points: England Women 6, Denmark Women 0

14 December 1997
Scorecard

Ireland; 155 (43.1 overs)	v	South Africa; 156/1 (27.5 overs)
Miriam Grealey 57 (–); Denise Reid 3/27 (7.1 overs)		Linda Olivier 78* (–); Catherine O'Neill 1/43 (10 overs)

South Africa Women won by 9 wickets
Nehru Stadium, Pune
Player of the match: Linda Olivier (SA)

- South Africa Women won the toss and elected to field.
- Points: South Africa Women 6, Ireland Women 0

16 December 1997
Scorecard

Australia; 412/3 (50 overs)	v	Denmark; 49 (25.5 overs)
Belinda Clark 229* (155); Dorte Christiansen 2/77 (10 overs)		Dorte Christiansen 9 (57); Karen Rolton 3/9 (3.5 overs)

Australia Women won by 363 runs
Middle Income Group Club Ground, Mumbai
Umpires: M. R. Singh and S. K. Sharma
Player of the match: Belinda Clark (Aus)

- Australia Women won the toss and elected to bat.
- Points: Australia Women 6, Denmark Women 0
- Belinda Clark's 229* is the highest individual score in a Women's Cricket World Cup.
- Australia Women's 412/3 is the highest team score in a Women's Cricket World Cup.
- Australia Women's winning margin of 363 runs is the largest winning margin in a Women's Cricket World Cup.

16 December 1997
Scorecard

England; 324/3 (50 overs)	v	Ireland; 116 (41.1 overs)
Charlotte Edwards 173* (155); Catherine O'Neill 1/34 (10 overs)		Caitriona Beggs 49 (110); Melissa Reynard 4/6 (4.1 overs)

England Women won by 208 runs
Nehru Stadium, Pune
Player of the match: Charlotte Edwards (Eng)

- England Women won the toss and elected to bat.
- Points: England Women 6, Ireland Women 0

16 December 1997
Scorecard

South Africa; 258/7 (50 overs)	v	Pakistan; 109 (40 overs)
Ally Kuylaars 74* (63); Ruksana Khan 2/43 (8 overs)		Sharmeen Khan 48 (77); Kerri Laing 3/4 (2 overs)

South Africa Women won by 149 runs
IPCL Sports Complex Ground, Vadodara
Umpires: C. R. Mohite and Ravi Deshmukh
Player of the match: Ally Kuylaars (SA)

- South Africa Women won the toss and elected to bat.
- Anne Stears and Karin Swart (SA) both made their WODI debuts.
- Points: South Africa Women 6, Pakistan Women 0

18 December 1997
Scorecard

England; 95 (49.4 overs)	v	Australia; 96/2 (26.5 overs)
Barbara Daniels 23 (46); Olivia Magno 4/10 (9 overs)		Michelle Goszko 51* (74); Clare Taylor 1/20 (9 overs)

Australia Women won by 8 wickets
Vidarbha Cricket Association Ground, Nagpur
Umpires: Deepak Kumar Kar and Suhas Phadkar
Player of the match: Olivia Magno (Aus)

- England Women won the toss and elected to bat.
- Points: Australia Women 6, England Women 0

18 December 1997
Scorecard

South Africa; 213/6 (50 overs)	v	Denmark; 114 (46.2 overs)
Linda Olivier 51 (92); Mette Gregersen 2/30 (5 overs)		Mette Frost 29 (96); Ally Kuylaars 2/15 (6.2 overs)

South Africa Women won by 99 runs
IPCL Sports Complex Ground, Vadodara
Umpires: C. R. Mohite and Dilip Kamath
Player of the match: Cindy Eksteen (SA)

- Denmark Women won the toss and elected to field.
- Points: South Africa Women 6, Denmark Women 0

18 December 1997
Scorecard

Ireland; 242/7 (50 overs)	v	Pakistan; 60 (30.3 overs)
Miriam Grealey 62 (66); Shaiza Khan 3/42 (10 overs)		Maliha Hussain 11 (69); Catherine O'Neill 4/10 (10 overs)

Ireland Women won by 182 runs
Nehru Stadium, Gurgaon
Umpires: Des Raj and S. K. Bansal
Player of the match: Catherine O'Neill (Ire)

- Pakistan Women won the toss and elected to field.
- Tracey Skoyles (Ire) made her WODI debut.
- Points: Ireland Women 6, Pakistan Women 0

=== Group B ===
==== Table ====
Team	Pld	W	L	T	NR	Pts
New Zealand	4	3	0	1	0	21
India	4	2	0	1	1	18
Netherlands	4	1	2	0	1	9
Sri Lanka	4	1	2	0	1	9
West Indies	4	0	3	0	1	3

==== Fixtures ====
9 December 1997
Scorecard

India	v	Sri Lanka

Match Abandoned
Feroz Shah Kotla Ground, Delhi
Umpires: Des Raj and Raman Sharma

- No toss.
- No play possible due to rain.
- Points: India Women 3, Sri Lanka Women 3

9 December 1997
Scorecard

Netherlands	v	West Indies

Match Abandoned
Eklavya Sports Stadium, Agra
Umpires: Devinder Sharma and Kamal Juneja

- No toss.
- No play possible due to rain.
- Points: Netherlands Women 3, West Indies Women 3

11 December 1997
Scorecard

Netherlands; 48/8 (20 overs)	v	New Zealand; 49/2 (8.1 overs)
Pauline te Beest 20 (35); Katrina Keenan 2/6 (4 overs)		Debbie Hockley 20 (12); Nicola Payne 2/26 (4 overs)

New Zealand Women won by 8 wickets
Mohan Meakins Cricket Stadium, Ghaziabad
Umpires: R. P. Singh and Vijay Chopra

- New Zealand Women won the toss and elected to field.
- Match reduced to 20 overs per side due to rain.
- Points: New Zealand Women 6, Netherlands Women 0

11 December 1997
Scorecard

West Indies; 79 (29.4 overs)	v	Sri Lanka; 81/4 (30.3 overs)
Eugena Gregg 16 (23); Thalika Gunaratne 4/6 (5.4 overs)		Vasanthi Ratnayake 24 (37); Desiree Luke 2/12 (10 overs)

Sri Lanka Women won by 6 wickets
Karnail Singh Stadium, Delhi
Umpires: M. S. Mahal and Rajan Seth
Player of the match: Thalika Gunaratne (SL)

- Sri Lanka Women won the toss and elected to field.
- Verena Felicien, Ann McEwen, Gwen Smith, Brenda Solzano-Rodney and Envis Williams (WI) all made their WODI debuts.
- Points: Sri Lanka Women 6, West Indies Women 0

13 December 1997
Scorecard

India; 145/7 (40 overs)	v	West Indies; 83 (33.2 overs)
Anju Jain 42 (101); Carol-Ann James 2/14 (8 overs)		Carol-Ann James 24 (70); Purnima Choudhary 5/21 (8 overs)

India Women won by 62 runs
Nahar Singh Stadium, Faridabad
Umpires: Maninder Singh and Yashpal Sharma
Player of the match: Purnima Choudhary (Ind)

- West Indies Women won the toss and elected to field.
- Match reduced to 40 overs per side due to rain.
- Purnima Choudhary, Deepa Marathe (Ind) and Roselyn Emmanuel (WI) all made their WODI debuts.
- Points: India Women 6, West Indies Women 0

13 December 1997
Scorecard

New Zealand; 236/3 (50 overs)	v	Sri Lanka; 71 (47.4 overs)
Debbie Hockley 100* (147); Dona Indralatha 1/42 (9 overs)		Rasanjali Silva 19 (31); Kelly Brown 2/8 (7.4 overs)

New Zealand Women won by 165 runs
Sector 16 Stadium, Chandigarh
Umpires: Jasbir Singh and Harnarain Sekhon
Player of the match: Debbie Hockley (NZ)

- Sri Lanka Women won the toss and elected to field.
- Points: New Zealand Women 6, Sri Lanka Women 0

15 December 1997
Scorecard

India; 175/8 (40 overs)	v	Netherlands; 82/9 (40 overs)
Anju Jain 35 (78); Ariette van Noortwijk 4/25 (8 overs)		Maartje Köster 18 (54); Purnima Rau 2/4 (5 overs)

India Women won by 93 runs
Mohan Meakins Cricket Stadium, Ghaziabad
Umpires: Satish Gupta and Subhash Mathur
Player of the match: Ariette van Noortwijk (Net)

- Netherlands Women won the toss and elected to field.
- Match reduced to 40 overs per side due to rain.
- Points: India Women 6, Netherlands Women 0

15 December 1997
Scorecard

New Zealand; 253/9 (50 overs)	v	West Indies; 55 (28.3 overs)
Debbie Hockley 100 (112); Desiree Luke 3/57 (10 overs)		Carol-Ann James 18* (58); Katrina Keenan 4/5 (10 overs)

New Zealand Women won by 198 runs
Sector 16 Stadium, Chandigarh
Umpires: Jasbir Singh and Harnarain Sekhon
Player of the match: Debbie Hockley (NZ)

- West Indies Women won the toss and elected to field.
- Lorna McKoy (WI) made her WODI debut.
- Points: New Zealand Women 6, West Indies Women 0

17 December 1997
Scorecard

New Zealand; 176/9 (50 overs)	v	India; 176 (49.1 overs)
Emily Drumm 69 (98); Purnima Rau 3/35 (10 overs)		Anju Jain 61 (119); Clare Nicholson 2/21 (10 overs)

Match Tied
Nehru Stadium, Indore
Umpires: Narendra Menon and Sudhir Asnani
Player of the match: Anju Jain (Ind)

- New Zealand Women won the toss and elected to bat.
- Points: India Women 3, New Zealand Women 3

17 December 1997
Scorecard

Netherlands; 138 (45.3 overs)	v	Sri Lanka; 91 (45.2 overs)
Nicola Payne 55 (102); Suthershini Sivanantham 4/18 (7.3 overs)		Dona Indralatha 32 (64); Sandra Kottman 4/24 (10 overs)

Netherlands Women won by 47 runs
Jamia Millia Islamia University Ground, Delhi
Umpires: Arun Bharadwaj and Surya Prakash Rao

- Sri Lanka Women won the toss and elected to field.
- Points: Netherlands Women 6, Sri Lanka 0

== Knockout stage ==
=== 9th-place play-off ===
20 December 1997
Scorecard

West Indies; 229/5 (45 overs)	v	Denmark; 128 (40 overs)
Carol-Ann James 99* (95); Malene Brock 2/38 (9 overs)		Mette Frost 37 (59); Carol-Ann James 3/16 (9 overs)

West Indies Women won by 101 runs
Harbax Singh Stadium, Delhi
Umpires: Devinder Sharma and Krishna Hariharan
Player of the match: Carol-Ann James (WI)

- Denmark Women won the toss and elected to field.
- Match reduced to 45 overs per side due to rain.

=== Quarter-finals ===
20 December 1997
Scorecard

Australia; 223/4 (50 overs)	v	Netherlands; 108/6 (50 overs)
Bronwyn Calver 76 (108); Caroline Rambaldo 2/28 (8 overs)		Ariette van Noortwijk 17 (54); Bronwyn Calver 1/3 (4 overs)

Australia Women won by 115 runs
K. D. Singh Babu Stadium, Lucknow
Umpires: Satish Gupta and Subhash Mathur
Player of the match: Bronwyn Calver (Aus)

- Australia Women won the toss and elected to bat.

21 December 1997
Scorecard

Sri Lanka; 104 (43.2 overs)	v	England; 105/1 (22.1 overs)
Vanessa Bowen 38 (100); Charlotte Edwards 3/21 (7 overs)		Charlotte Edwards 57 (65); Dona Indralatha 1/17 (4 overs)

England Women won by 9 wickets
Punjab Cricket Association Stadium, Mohali
Umpires: Jasbir Singh and HS Sekhon
Player of the match: Charlotte Edwards (Eng)

- Sri Lanka Women won the toss and elected to bat.
- Match was reduced to 46 overs per side due to rain.

22 December 1997
Scorecard

South Africa; 80 (43.1 overs)	v	India; 81/5 (28 overs)
Daleen Terblanche 25 (56); Deepa Marathe 2/4 (9.1 overs)		Purnima Rau 24 (40); Kim Price 2/3 (5 overs)

India Women won by 5 wickets
Moin-ul-Haq Stadium, Patna

- South Africa Women won the toss and elected to bat.

23 December 1997
Scorecard

New Zealand; 244/3 (50 overs)	v	Ireland; 105/9 (50 overs)
Debbie Hockley 70 (118); Clare Shillington 1/33 (8 overs)		Adele Spence 18* (35); Kelly Brown 2/12 (9 overs)

New Zealand won by 139 runs
Wankhede Stadium, Mumbai
Umpires: Sameer Bandekar and Borni Jamula
Player of the match: Debbie Hockley (NZ)

- New Zealand Women won the toss and elected to bat.

=== Semi-finals ===
24 December 1997
Scorecard

Australia; 123/7 (32 overs)	v	India; 104/9 (30 overs)
Joanne Broadbent 33 (77); Pramila Bhatt 3/25 (7 overs)		Chanderkanta Kaul 48 (78); Cathryn Fitzpatrick 3/18 (7 overs)

Australia Women won by 19 runs
Harbax Singh Stadium, Delhi
Umpires: Des Raj and Yashpal Sharma
Player of the match: Cathryn Fitzpatrick (Aus)

- India Women won the toss and elected to field.
- Bad light reduced the match to 32 overs a side.
- India were penalised by two overs for a slow over rate.

India and Australia both qualified for the semi-finals, and faced each other on Christmas Eve at Delhi. The start of the match was delayed by two hours and 15 minutes due to bad light, and as a result each side was given 32 overs to bat. India won the toss, and captain Pramila Bhatt chose to field first. Australia, put into bat, began well with an opening partnership of 66 between captain Belinda Clark (31) and Joanne Broadbent (33). Bhatt herself broke the partnership, reducing Australia from 66/0 to 83/3, claiming the wickets of Mel Jones (5) and Michelle Goszko (0), and ending with figures of 3/25. A knock of 23 from Karen Rolton and support from Bronwyn Calver (11) saw Australia past 100, however both Olivia Magno and Charmaine Mason were stumped by Anju Jain off the bowling of Neetu David for ducks, and Australia managed 123 from their 32 overs. For slow bowling, two overs were deducted from India's batting innings.

India's reply did not begin well, falling to 24/2 with both Jain and Anjum Chopra out cheaply for 18 and two, respectively. Chanderkanta Kaul scored 48, however only two other players reached double figures, and together with Smitha Harikrishna and Renu Margrate (both scoring one) they were all run out. Bhatt hit six runs before she was bowled by Cathryn Fitzpatrick, who took 3/18. India's last three players all failed to score. The hosts fell 19 runs short by the end of their 30 overs on 104/9.

26 December 1997
Scorecard

New Zealand; 175/6 (50 overs)	v	England; 155 (47.5 overs)
Debbie Hockley 43 (104); Karen Smithies 3/40 (10 overs)		Jan Brittin 32 (88); Clare Nicholson 2/29 (10 overs)

New Zealand Women won by 20 runs
M. A. Chidambaram Stadium, Chepauk
Umpires: N Muralidaran and P Venkatesan
Player of the match: Debbie Hockley (NZ)

- New Zealand women won the toss and elected to bat.

On Boxing Day, the defending champions England, and New Zealand faced each other in the second semi final at Chepauk, in Chennai. New Zealand won the toss, and captain Maia Lewis chose to bat first. New Zealand lost the early wicket of Emily Drumm for four, however they went on to a score of 93 before another wicket fell. Debbie Hockley top scored with 43, and Shelley Fruin (29), Katrina Keenan (35) and 28 extras took New Zealand to 175/6 from their 50 overs. England's bowlers bowled economically, with three going at economy rates of under 2.90, and medium-pacer Karen Smithies took 3/40.

England, set 176 runs from 49 overs, having been fined one over for their own slow over rate, reached 100 for the loss of four wickets, with Charlotte Edwards scoring 25, Jan Brittin 32 and Barbara Daniels 30. Only two other players reached double figures, however, as England slumped from 100/4 to 155 all out from 47.5 overs. Clare Nicholson took 2/29 for New Zealand, with Katrina Keenan, Hockley, Catherine Campbell and Sarah McLauchlan taking one wicked each, and the remaining four England players being run out. This gave New Zealand a 20 run victory, and they progressed to the finals.

=== Final ===
29 December 1997
Scorecard

New Zealand; 164 (49.3 overs)	v	Australia; 165/5 (47.4 overs)
Debbie Hockley 79 (121); Bronwyn Calver 2/29 (10 overs)		Belinda Clark 52 (81); Katrina Keenan 2/23 (10 overs)

Australia Women won by 5 wickets
Eden Gardens, Calcutta
Umpires: Aloke Bhattacharjee and S Choudhary
Player of the match: Debbie Hockley (NZ)

- New Zealand Women won the toss and elected to bat.

The final between Australia and New Zealand took place on 29 December at Eden Gardens in Calcutta, in front of an estimated crowd of at least 50–60,000 spectators. New Zealand won the toss, with captain Maia Lewis choosing to bat first. New Zealand began poorly, losing Emily Drumm, Shelley Fruin and Katrina Keenan for six, eight and five respectively, reaching 49/3. Debbie Hockley, New Zealand's opener, scored 79 (48%) of her team score, as New Zealand eventually reached 164 all out from 49.3 overs. Hockley was one of only three New Zealand players to score in double figures, captain Lewis and wicket-keeper Rebecca Rolls scoring 10 and 18 respectively.

Australia bowled well, Bronwyn Calver, Karen Rolton and Charmaine Mason taking two wickets each, with Cathryn Fitzpatrick taking 1/22 off ten overs, including that of Hockley's wicket. Australia were set 165 runs to win, and began solidly, reaching 107/2 with Belinda Clark reaching 52 before being caught and bowled by Catherine Campbell. Knocks of 37 from Michelle Goszko and Karen Rolton's 24 enabled Australia to reach 165/5 from 47.4 overs, three minutes quicker than the New Zealand innings of 176 minutes. The New Zealand bowlers shared two wickets each between Keenan and Kathryn Ramel, with the former the most economical, taking 2/23 at 2.30 an over, however they could not prevent Australia's victory.

== Records and statistics ==
=== Batting records ===
- Highest totals: Australia 412/3.
- Most runs: Debbie Hockley (NZ) 456 runs.
- Highest score: Belinda Clark (Aus) 229*.
- Highest average: Belinda Clark (Aus) 148.33.
- Most hundreds: Debbie Hockley (NZ) Two.
- Most fifties: Debbie Hockley (NZ) Two.
- Most ducks: Thanuga Ekanayake (SL) Three.

=== Bowlings records ===
- Most wickets: Katrina Keenan (NZ) 13.
- Best bowling figures in an innings: Purnima Choudhary (IND) 5/21.
- Best averages: Jodi Dannatt (Aus) 7.25.
- Best economy rate: Sangita Dabir (IND) 1.5.
- Best strike rate: Denise Reid (SA) 14.3.
- Most four-wickets-in-an-innings: Suthershini Sivanantham (SL) One.
- Most five-wickets-in-an-innings: Purnima Choudhary (IND) One.
- Best economy rates in an innings: Avril Fahey (AUS) 0.2. (5 overs)
- Best strike rate in an innings: Olivia Magno (AUS) 3.3.
- Most runs conceded in an innings: Susanne Nielsen (DEN) 77 (10 overs).

=== Wicket-keeping records ===
- Most dismissals: Jane Smit (ENG) 13.
- Most dismissals in an innings: Jane Smit (ENG) Four.

=== Fielding records ===
- Most catches: Nicola Payne (NZ) Six.
- Most catches in an innings: Kathryn Ramel (NZ) Three.

=== Partnership records ===
- Highest partnership: Janette Brittin and Barbara Daniels (ENG) 203.
