= List of international cricket grounds in India =

Locations of active international stadiums in India

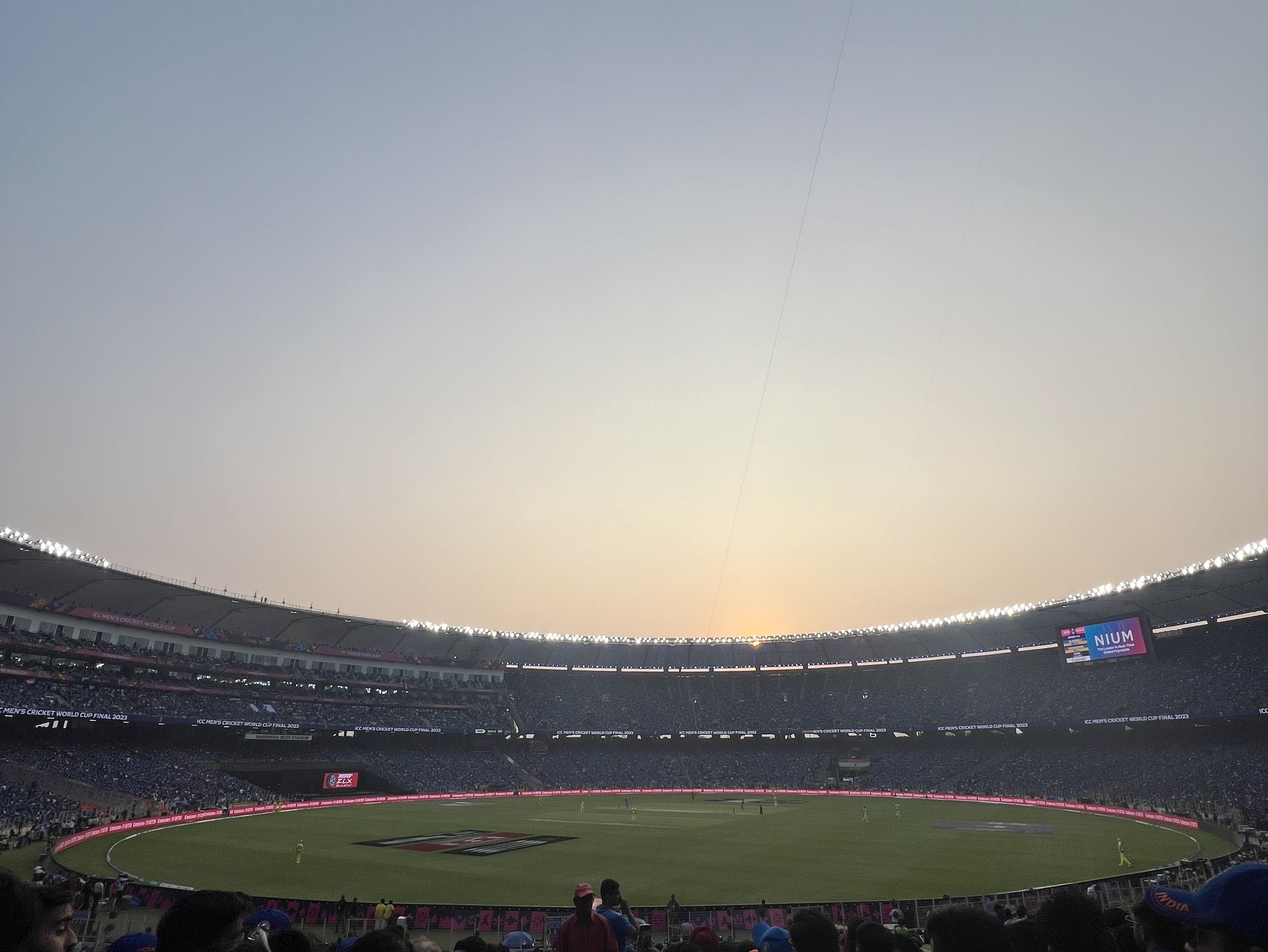
The Narendra Modi Stadium in Ahmedabad is the largest cricket stadium by capacity in the world.

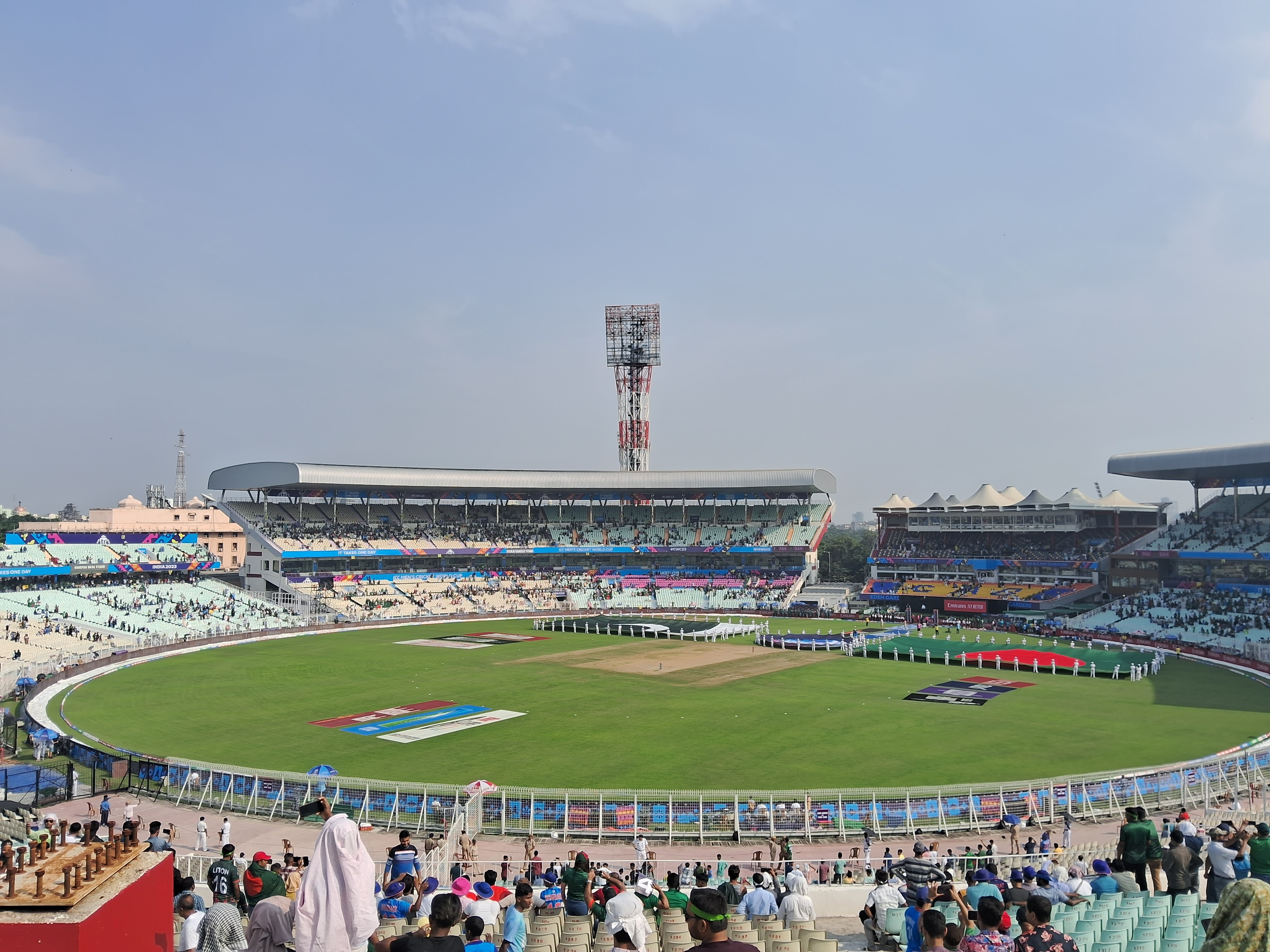
The Eden Gardens in Kolkata is the second-largest cricket stadium by capacity in India.

This is a list of international cricket grounds in India that have hosted at least one international cricket match. A cricket ground is a large grass field on which the game of cricket is played which are generally oval in shape with no fixed dimensions. A boundary rope usually demarcates the perimeter of the field and a cricket pitch, an area close to the centre of the field is where the batter hits the bowled ball and run between the wickets to score runs, while the fielding team tries to return the ball to either wicket to prevent this.

Board of Control for Cricket in India (BCCI) is the national governing body of cricket in India. The BCCI was established on 1 December 1928 at Madras and joined the Imperial Cricket Conference in 1926 which later became the International Cricket Council. BCCI is a consortium of state cricket associations who own and operate most of the stadiums along with the respective state governments.

International cricket was held in India for the first time on 15 December 1933 when the Gymkhana Ground in Bombay hosted the only test match during England's tour of India. India recorded its first win in fifth test of home series against England on 10 February 1952 at the M. A. Chidambaram Stadium in Madras. The first ODI match in India was hosted by the Sardar Vallabhbhai Patel Stadium, Ahmedabad during the series against England on 25 November 1981. India played the first T20I match in India at the Brabourne Stadium in Mumbai on 20 October 2007 against the visiting Australian team.

The first women's test match hosted by India began on 31 October 1976 with India playing West Indies at M. Chinnaswamy Stadium at Bangalore. The first WODI was hosted during the 1978 Women's Cricket World Cup with Australia playing New Zealand on 1 January 1978 at Keenan Stadium in Jamshedpur. India played its first WODI against England on the same day at Eden Gardens in Calcutta. The first WT20I played in India was hosted on 4 March 2010 by Bandra Kurla Complex Ground in Mumbai against England.

As of June 2026, 83 cricket venues have hosted an international match, the most in any country.

== Active stadiums ==
Any stadium that has hosted an international match in the last Seven years have been listed as active unless the stadium has been deliberately closed.

Last updated: 6 June 2026

Name	City	Capacity	No. of matches						First match	Last match
Name	City	Capacity	Test	ODI	T20I	WTest	WODI	WT20I	First match	Last match
Eden Gardens	Kolkata	68,000	43	36	19	0	4	1	5 January 1934	4 March 2026
M. A. Chidambaram Stadium	Chennai	38,200	35	28	10	1	11	4	10 February 1934	26 February 2026
Arun Jaitley Cricket Stadium	Delhi	35,200	36	31	14	2	3	6	10 November 1948	1 March 2026
Brabourne Stadium	Mumbai	50,000	18	9	1	0	11	10	9 December 1948	20 December 2022
Green Park Stadium	Kanpur	32,000	24	15	1	0	0	0	12 January 1952	27 September 2024
M. Chinnaswamy Stadium	Bengaluru	40,000	25	31	10	1	12	8	22 November 1974	20 October 2024
Wankhede Stadium	Mumbai	33,100	27	28	17	2	9	4	23 January 1975	5 March 2026
Barabati Stadium	Cuttack	45,000	2	19	4	1	8	0	27 January 1982	9 December 2025
Sawai Mansingh Stadium	Jaipur	30,000	1	19	1	0	9	0	2 October 1983	17 November 2021
Narendra Modi Stadium (Note: The existing stadium was opened in 2020. Earlier matches were hosted by Sardar Patel Stadium at the same location which was torn down in 2015.)	Ahmedabad	132,000	16	32	15	0	7	3	12 November 1983	8 March 2026
I. S. Bindra Stadium	Mohali	27,000	14	26	7	0	1	3	22 November 1993	11 January 2024
Reliance Stadium	Vadodara	20,000	0	10	0	0	11	3	16 December 1997	14 October 2019
ACA–VDCA Cricket Stadium	Visakhapatnam	27,500	3	11	5	0	10	8	5 April 2005	28 January 2026
Rajiv Gandhi Stadium	Hyderabad	55,000	6	10	3	0	0	0	16 November 2005	12 October 2024
Holkar Stadium	Indore	30,000	3	8	4	0	5	0	15 April 2006	18 January 2026
VCA Stadium	Nagpur	45,000	7	9	14	0	3	2	6 November 2008	21 January 2026
DY Patil Stadium	Navi Mumbai	45,300	0	0	0	1	5	8	11 November 2009	2 November 2025
MCA Stadium	Pune	42,700	3	12	5	0	0	0	20 December 2012	31 January 2025
Niranjan Shah Stadium	Rajkot	28,000	3	5	6	0	3	0	11 January 2013	15 January 2026
JSCA Stadium	Ranchi	50,000	3	7	4	0	3	3	19 January 2013	30 November 2025
HPCA Stadium	Dharamshala	21,200	2	9	11	0	0	2	27 January 2013	14 December 2025
SVSP Complex	Greater Noida	8,000	0	5	6	0	0	0	8 March 2017	10 March 2020
ACA Stadium	Guwahati	46,000	1	2	5	0	5	3	10 October 2017	25 January 2026
The Sports Hub	Thiruvananthapuram	50,000	0	2	5	0	0	3	7 November 2017	31 January 2026
Rajiv Gandhi Stadium	Dehradun	25,000	1	5	6	0	0	0	3 June 2018	15 March 2019
Ekana Cricket Stadium	Lucknow	50,000	1	9	6	0	0	0	6 November 2018	3 November 2023
Lalabhai Contractor Stadium	Surat	7,000	0	0	0	0	0	4	24 September 2019	4 October 2019
Veer Narayan Singh Stadium	Raipur	65,000	0	2	2	0	0	0	21 January 2023	23 January 2026
Shrimant Madhavrao Scindia Cricket Stadium	Gwalior	50,000	0	0	1	0	0	0	6 October 2024	6 October 2024
Maharaja Yadavindra Singh International Cricket Stadium	New Chandigarh	38,000	1	1	1	0	2	0	14 September 2025	6 June 2026
Baroda Cricket Association Stadium	Vadodara	40,000	0	1	0	0	0	3	22 December 2024	11 January 2026

=== Former stadiums ===
Name	City	Capacity	No. of matches						First match	Last match
Name	City	Capacity	Test	ODI	T20I	WTest	WODI	WT20I	First match	Last match
Gymkhana Ground	Mumbai	15,000	1	0	0	0	1	0	15 December 1933	15 December 1933
University Ground	Lucknow	n/a	1	0	0	0	0	0	23 October 1952	23 October 1952
Lal Bahadur Shastri Stadium	Hyderabad	25,000	3	14	0	1	7	0	19 November 1955	15 November 2003
Jawaharlal Nehru Stadium	Chennai	40,000	9	0	0	0	0	0	6 January 1956	27 February 1965
VCA Ground	Nagpur	40,000	9	14	0	0	1	0	3 October 1969	14 October 2007
Sardar Vallabhbhai Patel Stadium	Ahmedabad	50,000	0	1	0	0	0	0	25 November 1981	25 November 1981
Gandhi Stadium	Jalandhar	16,000	3	0	0	0	0	0	20 December 1981	20 February 1994
Gandhi Sports Complex Ground	Amritsar	16,000	0	2	0	0	0	0	12 September 1982	18 November 1995
Sher-i-Kashmir Stadium	Srinagar	12,000	0	2	0	0	0	0	13 October 1983	9 September 1986
Moti Bagh Stadium	Vadodara	18,000	0	3	0	0	0	0	9 November 1983	17 December 1988
Nehru Stadium	Indore	25,000	0	9	0	0	2	0	1 December 1983	31 March 2001
Keenan Stadium	Jamshedpur	19,000	0	10	0	1	3	0	7 December 1983	12 April 2006
Nehru Stadium	Guwahati	25,000	0	14	0	0	2	0	17 December 1983	28 November 2010
Country Golf Club Ground	Faridabad	n/a	0	0	0	0	1	0	19 January 1984	19 January 1984
Jawaharlal Nehru Stadium	Delhi	60,000	0	2	0	0	0	0	28 September 1984	14 November 1991
University Stadium	Trivandrum	20,000	0	2	0	0	0	0	1 October 1984	25 January 1988
Nehru Stadium	Pune	25,000	0	11	0	0	4	0	5 December 1984	3 November 2005
Sector 16 Stadium	Chandigarh	30,000	1	5	0	0	2	0	27 January 1985	8 October 2007
Maulana Azad Stadium	Jammu	20,000	0	0	0	1	1	0	24 March 1985	24 March 1985
Madhavrao Scindia Cricket Ground	Rajkot	15,000	0	12	0	0	2	0	7 October 1986	15 December 2009
Nahar Singh Stadium	Faridabad	25,000	0	8	0	0	2	0	19 January 1988	31 March 2006
Captain Roop Singh Stadium	Gwalior	18,000	0	12	0	0	0	0	22 January 1988	24 February 2010
Indira Priyadarshini Stadium	Visakhapatnam	25,000	0	5	0	0	0	0	10 December 1988	3 April 2001
Nehru Stadium	Fatorda	19,000	0	7	0	0	0	0	25 October 1989	14 February 2007
K. D. Singh Babu Stadium	Lucknow	25,000	1	1	0	4	4	0	27 October 1989	18 January 1994
Moin-ul-Haq Stadium	Patna	25,000	0	3	0	1	5	0	15 November 1993	27 February 1996
Calcutta Cricket and Football Club	Kolkata	15,000	0	0	0	1	0	0	17 November 1995	17 November 1995
Gangothri Glades Cricket Ground	Mysore	15,000	0	0	0	1	1	0	10 December 1997	10 December 1997
Karnail Singh Stadium	Delhi	5,000	0	0	0	0	1	0	11 December 1997	11 December 1997
Mohan Meakins Cricket Stadium	Ghaziabad	n/a	0	0	0	0	2	0	11 December 1997	15 December 1997
Gymkhana Ground	Secunderabad	n/a	0	0	0	0	1	0	14 December 1997	14 December 1997
Middle Income Group Ground	Mumbai	n/a	0	0	0	0	4	0	16 December 1997	13 February 2013
JMU Ground	Delhi	n/a	0	0	0	1	1	0	17 December 1997	17 December 1997
Nehru Stadium	Gurgaon	25,000	0	0	0	0	1	0	18 December 1997	18 December 1997
Harbax Singh Stadium	Delhi	n/a	0	0	0	0	2	0	20 December 1997	24 December 1997
Jawaharlal Nehru Stadium	Kochi	25,000	0	9	0	0	4	0	1 April 1998	8 October 2014
Barkatullah Khan Stadium	Jodhpur	30,000	0	2	0	0	0	0	8 December 2000	21 November 2002
Guru Nanak College Ground	Chennai	n/a	0	0	0	0	1	0	6 January 2002	6 January 2002
Indira Gandhi Stadium	Vijayawada	25,000	0	1	0	0	1	0	24 November 2002	24 November 2002
N2 Stadium	Aurangabad	20,000	0	0	0	0	1	0	7 December 2003	7 December 2003
Chemplast Cricket Ground	Chennai	n/a	0	0	0	0	8	0	16 December 2003	5 March 2007
Tata Digwadih Stadium	Dhanbad	n/a	0	0	0	0	1	0	26 February 2004	26 February 2004
Tau Devi Lal Stadium	Gurgaon	7,000	0	0	0	0	1	0	12 March 2004	12 March 2004
Infosys Ground	Mysore	n/a	0	0	0	0	2	0	11 December 2004	13 December 2004
Bilakhiya Stadium	Vapi	n/a	0	0	0	1	1	0	19 December 2004	19 December 2004
Pithwala Stadium	Surat	n/a	0	0	0	0	1	0	22 December 2004	22 December 2004
Mayajaal Ground	Chennai	n/a	0	0	0	0	1	0	28 December 2004	28 December 2004
Satindra Mohan Dev Stadium	Silchar	30,000	0	0	0	0	1	0	7 December 2005	7 December 2005
Bandra Kurla Complex Ground	Mumbai	n/a	0	0	0	0	4	3	1 March 2010	8 February 2013
DRIEMS Ground	Cuttack	n/a	0	0	0	0	3	0	1 February 2013	5 February 2013
Dr PVG Raju ACA Sports Complex	Vizianagaram	50,000	0	0	0	0	0	2	25 January 2014	26 January 2014
ACA–KDCA Cricket Ground	Mulapadu	n/a	0	0	0	0	3	3	10 November 2016	22 November 2016

== See also ==
- List of cricket grounds in India
- List of stadiums in India
- Cricket in India
- Lists of stadiums
