= Zimbabwean cricket team in India in 2001–02 =

International cricket tour

Zimbabwe's tour of India in 2001-02
	India	Zimbabwe
- Dates: 15 February – 19 March 2002
Captains	Sourav Ganguly	Stuart Carlisle

Test series
- Result: India won the 2-match series 2–0
Most runs	Sachin Tendulkar (254)	Stuart Carlisle (142)
Most wickets	Anil Kumble (16)	Ray Price (10)
- Player of the series: Anil Kumble (Ind)

One Day International series
- Results: India won the 5-match series 3–2
Most runs	Dinesh Mongia (263)	Alistair Campbell (251)
Most wickets	Harbhajan Singh (10); Zaheer Khan (10)	Douglas Hondo (7)
- Player of the series: Dinesh Mongia (Ind)

The Zimbabwe cricket team toured India from 15 February to 19 March 2002 to play the India cricket team. The tour included two Tests and five One Day Internationals. India won the Test series 2–0 and the ODI series 3–2.

== Tour match ==
15–17 February
Scorecard

Indian Board President's XI	v	Zimbabwe
361/3 (97 overs); Gautam Gambhir 218 (284); Raymond Price 2/102 (26 overs)		340 (117.3 overs); Andy Flower 94 (158); Amit Mishra 6/95 (29.3 overs)
154/1 (42 overs); Abhijit Kale 90 (127); Travis Friend 1/39 (11 overs)

Match drawn
Indira Gandhi Stadium, Vijayawada
Umpires: O. Krishna and K. R. Shankar

- Indian Board President's XI won the toss and choose to bat.

== Test series ==
=== 1st Test ===
21 February 2002
Scorecard

Zimbabwe	v	India
287 (103.5 overs); Stuart Carlisle 77 (204); Anil Kumble 4/82 (33.5 overs)		570/7d (184.5 overs); Sachin Tendulkar 176 (316); Ray Price 5/182 (68 overs)
182 (88.4 overs); Trevor Gripper 60 (211); Anil Kumble 5/63 (37 overs)

India won by an innings and 101 runs
Vidarbha Cricket Association Ground, Nagpur
Umpires: David Shepherd (Eng) and S. Venkataraghavan (Ind)
Player of the match: Anil Kumble (Ind)

- Zimbabwe won the toss and decided to bat.
- Travis Friend (Zim) was banned from bowling in the India first innings (for beamers).

=== 2nd Test ===
28 February 2002
Scorecard

Zimbabwe	v	India
329 (110.5 overs); Dion Ebrahim 94 (203); Anil Kumble 3/88 (34 overs)		354 (129.2 overs); Sourav Ganguly 136 (284); Heath Streak 4/92 (37.2 overs)
146 (67.3 overs); Grant Flower 49 (118); Harbhajan Singh 6/62 (31 overs)		126/6 (45.5 overs); Sachin Tendulkar 42 (52); Grant Flower 2/22 (6 overs)

India won by 4 wickets
Feroz Shah Kotla, Delhi
Umpires: Asoka de Silva (SL) and Arani Jayaprakash (Ind)
Player of the match: Harbhajan Singh (Ind)

- Zimbabwe won the toss and decided to bat.
- Anil Kumble reached 750 wickets in first-class matches when he dismissed Dion Ebrahim in the Zimbabwe second innings.

== ODI series ==
=== 1st ODI ===
7 March 2002
Scorecard

India; 274/6 (50 overs)	v	Zimbabwe; 277/9 (49.4 overs)
VVS Laxman 75 (99); Heath Streak 2/53 (10 overs)		Alistair Campbell 84 (113); Zaheer Khan 4/47 (10 overs)

Zimbabwe won by 1 wicket
Mayur Stadium, Faridabad
Umpires: Subroto Porel (Ind) and Ivaturi Shivram (Ind)
Player of the match: Douglas Marillier (Zim)

- India won the toss and decided to bat.
- Douglas Marillier (Zim) recorded the first half-century by a number 10 batsman, and the quickest for Zimbabwe in ODIs, in terms of balls faced (21).

=== 2nd ODI ===
10 March 2002 (D/N)
Scorecard

India; 319/6 (50 overs)	v	Zimbabwe; 255 (43.3 overs)
Sourav Ganguly 86 (83); Gary Brent 2/60 (9 overs)		Travis Friend 63 (59); Dinesh Mongia 3/31 (6 overs)

India won by 64 runs
Punjab Cricket Association Stadium, Mohali
Umpires: Aloke Bhattacharjee (Ind) and Shavir Tarapore (Ind)
Player of the match: Sourav Ganguly (Ind)

- India won the toss and decided to bat.

=== 3rd ODI ===
13 March 2002
Scorecard

India; 191 (48.3 overs)	v	Zimbabwe; 197/4 (44.2 overs)
Mohammad Kaif 56 (78); Douglas Hondo 4/37 (8.3 overs)		Alistair Campbell 71 (119); Ajit Agarkar 2/28 (10 overs)

Zimbabwe won by 6 wickets
Nehru Stadium, Kochi
Umpires: Vijay Chopra (Ind) and Devendra Sharma (Ind)
Player of the match: Douglas Hondo (Zim)

- India won the toss and decided to bat.
- Alistair Campbell passed 5,000 runs in ODI matches when he reached 60.

=== 4th ODI ===
16 March 2002 (D/N)
Scorecard

Zimbabwe; 240/8 (50 overs)	v	India; 244/5 (48.1 overs)
Andrew Flower 89 (107); Ajit Agarkar 4/32 (10 overs)		Yuvraj Singh 80* (60); Travis Friend 2/42 (8.1 overs)

India won by 5 wickets
Lal Bahadur Shastri Stadium, Hyderabad
Umpires: Satish Gupta (Ind) and Krishna Hariharan (Ind)
Player of the match: Yuvraj Singh (Ind)

- Zimbabwe won the toss and decided to bat.
- Murali Kartik (Ind) made his debut in ODIs.
- Grant Flower (Zim) passed 1,000 runs against India in ODIs.

=== 5th ODI ===
19 March
Scorecard

India; 333/6 (50 overs)	v	Zimbabwe; 232 (42.1 overs)
Dinesh Mongia 159* (147); Douglas Hondo 2/56 (10 overs)		Grant Flower 48 (47); Harbhajan Singh 4/33 (9.1 overs)

India won by 101 runs
Nehru Stadium, Guwahati
Umpires: Sameer Bandekar (Ind) and K. G. Lakshminarayan (Ind)
Player of the match: Dinesh Mongia (Ind)

- India won the toss and chose to bat.
- Zaheer Khan (Ind) claimed his 50th wicket in ODIs.
