= Zinzan Brooke =

Zinzan Brooke MNZM
- Born: 14 February 1965 (age 61) Waiuku, New Zealand
- Height: 1.90 m (6 ft 3 in)
- Weight: 102 kg (16 st 1 lb)
- School: Mahurangi College
- Notable relatives: Lucas Brooke (son); Robin Brooke (brother)

Rugby union career
- Position(s): Number 8 Flanker
Senior career
Years	Team	Apps	(Points)
1986–1992	Lazio		
1992–1993	Casale		
1997–2001	Harlequins		
2001–2003	Coventry		
Provincial / State sides
Years	Team	Apps	(Points)
1986–1997	Auckland		
Super Rugby
Years	Team	Apps	(Points)
1996–1997	Auckland Blues		
International career
Years	Team	Apps	(Points)
1987–1997	New Zealand	58	(89)

Zinzan Valentine Brooke MNZM (born Murray Zinzan Brooke on 14 February 1965) is a former New Zealand rugby union footballer who played at number eight.

Brooke played 58 tests for New Zealand, and 42 non-international matches for the All Blacks. He captained Auckland Blues to Super 12 championships in 1996 and 1997 and was an influential figure in Auckland's dominance in the National Provincial Championship during the late 1980s and 1990s. He scored 17 tries in test matches, then a world record for a forward. He also played for New Zealand Māori.

== Rugby career ==
Brooke was a founding player of the Southerners Sports Club (Bangkok), playing in the inaugural side in 1994 against Taradale RFC. In 1995 he published his autobiography Zinny: The Zinzan Brooke story, written with Alex Veysey.

Brooke is considered one of the best number eights to have ever played for the All Blacks. He had the running and kicking skills of a backline player which made him extremely mobile and agile as a forward. He once kicked a 48-metre drop goal during a 1995 Rugby World Cup match, one of three he scored in test matches.

In the 1997 New Year Honours, Brooke was appointed a Member of the New Zealand Order of Merit, for services to rugby.

Brooke scored his third drop goal during the All Blacks' impressive 42–7 win against Wales at Wembley Stadium on 29 November 1997, giving him the rare distinction of being the only rugby player to have "scored a goal at Wembley". He also set up a try for Christian Cullen.

In 2007, former England centre and captain Will Carling published his list of the '50 Greatest Rugby players' in The Daily Telegraph, and ranked Brooke the ninth greatest player of all time, stating:

"For a forward his skills were outrageous. As comfortable playing sevens as 15s, he had better kicking and handling skills than some fly-halves playing international rugby. You align that with his strength and ability as a forward to read the game – he was unique."

== Retirement ==
In 1997 he retired from international rugby union and moved to England to play for Harlequins, and later coach it. During the 2002/03 season he played for Coventry in National Division One. He now plays amateur rugby union for Windsor Rugby Club in Berkshire, England.

In 2011, while back in New Zealand for the 2011 Rugby World Cup, Brooke was inducted into the TVNZ This Is Your Life wall of fame. His family joined him from England at the Auckland Viaduct for the live show. Special guests included his four brothers, Buck Shelford and Michael Jones.

Brooke ran Frances Lodge, a boutique bed and breakfast in Windsor, Berkshire, with his wife. However, it closed when both Brooke and his wife were declared bankrupt in the UK in August 2012.

Brooke suffered head trauma in May 2007 while falling out of a taxi in the Spanish town of Elche, though the circumstances are unclear.

During the COVID-19 outbreak, Brooke began advocating online against the use of face masks and posting support for alternative treatments such as Ivermectin and Hydroxychloroquine. These claims were criticised by New Zealand scientists such as Michael Baker and Siouxsie Wiles calling on Brooke to engage with scientists and to seek out "reputable sources".

== Name and family ==
Zinzan Brooke's unusual first name has a long history in the Brooke family, though its origins are uncertain. It has been suggested that it may be an anglicised Italian or Albanian name. The name links Brooke's family with another notable New Zealand sporting family, that of cricketer Zin Harris (full name Parke Gerald Zinzan Harris) and his sons Chris Zinzan Harris and Ben Zinzan Harris, all of whom are distant relatives of the Brookes.

He has two other brothers who also played rugby at representative level: Marty, who played for Auckland and Southland; and Robin, who played lock for Auckland and New Zealand.

Brooke is a member of the Ngāpuhi iwi.

His son Lucas Brooke is also a rugby union player in England.

== Honours ==
International Rugby Board awards

- World Rugby Hall of Fame Inductee Number 177: 2026

== Bibliography ==
- Quinn, Keith (1999). A Century of Rugby Greats. Auckland: Celebrity Books. ISBN 0-9583729-8-5.

Awards
Preceded by John Timu	Tom French Memorial; Māori rugby union player of the year 1992; 1994	Succeeded by Arran Pene
Preceded by Arran Pene	Tom French Memorial; Māori rugby union player of the year 1992; 1994	Succeeded by Robin Brooke
