= Sri Lanka women's national cricket team record by opponent =

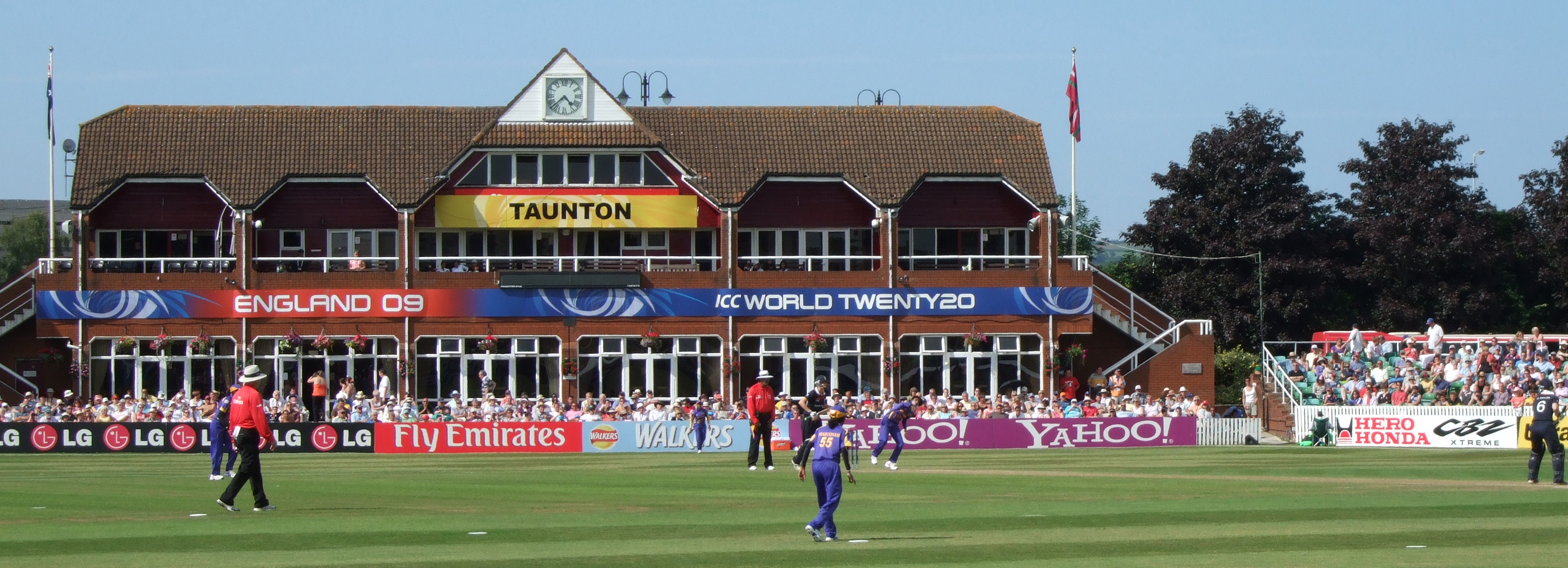
Sri Lanka playing against England at the 2009 ICC Women's World T20.

The Sri Lanka women's national cricket team represents Sri Lanka in international women's cricket. A full member of the International Cricket Council (ICC), the team is governed by Sri Lanka Cricket. Sri Lanka played in its first and only Test match to date in April 1998, defeating Pakistan by 309 runs.Sri Lanka made its One Day International (ODI) debut in 1997, against the Netherlands, and later in the year participated in the 1997 World Cup in India. As of July 2023, they have played 178 WODIs matches against 10 opponents. They have participated in six editions of the Women's Cricket World Cup, reaching the quarter-finals in 1997.

Since their first Women's Twenty20 International (WT20I) against Pakistan in 2009, Sri Lanka have played 128 matches. They have been most successful against Pakistan with 6 wins against them. They have participated in all editions of the Women's T20 World Cup, never progressing past the group stage.

== Key ==
- M – Denotes the number of matches played
- W – Denotes the number of wins for Sri Lanka against the listed opponent
- L – Denotes the number of losses for Sri Lanka against the listed opponent
- T – Denotes the number of ties between Sri Lanka and the listed opponent
- D – Denotes the number of draws between Sri Lanka and the listed opponent
- NR – Denotes the number of no results between Sri Lanka and the listed opponent
- Tie+W – Number of matches tied and then won in a tiebreaker such as a bowl-out or Super Over
- Tie+L – Number of matches tied and then lost in a tiebreaker such as a bowl-out or Super Over
- Win% – Win percentage (in ODI and T20I cricket, a tie counts as half a win, and no results are disregarded)
- Loss% – Loss percentage
- Draw% – Draw percentage
- First – Year of the first match between Sri Lanka and the listed opponent
- Last – Year of the latest match between Sri Lanka and the listed opponent

== Test cricket ==
Sri Lanka women Test cricket record by opponent
Opponent	M	W	L	D	Win%	Loss%	Draw%	First	Last
Pakistan	1	1	0	0	100.00	0.00	0.00	1998	1998
Total	1	1	0	0	100.00	0.00	0.00	1998	1998

== One Day International ==
Sri Lanka women One Day International record by opponent
Opponent	M	W	L	T	NR	Win%	First	Last
Australia	11	0	11	0	0	0.00	2000	2019
Bangladesh	3	2	0	0	1	100.00	2017	2023
Denmark	1	1	0	0	0	100.00	2017	2017
England	17	1	15	0	1	6.25	1997	2019
India	32	2	29	0	1	6.25	2000	2022
Ireland	4	3	0	0	1	100.00	2000	2017
Netherlands	13	10	3	0	0	76.92	1997	2011
New Zealand	13	2	11	0	0	15.38	1997	2023
Pakistan	33	22	11	0	0	66.66	1998	2022
South Africa	20	4	14	0	2	22.22	2000	2019
West Indies	32	14	18	0	0	43.75	1997	2017
Total	178	60	112	0	6	33.70	1997	2023

== Twenty20 International ==
Sri Lanka women Twenty20 International record by opponent
Opponent	M	W	L	T	Tie+W	Tie+L	NR	Win%	First	Last
Australia	7	0	7	0	0	0	0	0.00	2016	2023
Bangladesh	12	8	3	0	0	0	0	75.00	2012	2023
England	12	2	10	0	0	0	0	16.66	2009	2023
India	23	4	18	0	0	0	1	17.39	2009	2022
Ireland	3	3	0	0	0	0	0	100.00	2010	2016
Kenya	1	1	0	0	0	0	0	100.00	2022	2022
Malaysia	3	3	0	0	0	0	0	100.00	2018	2022
Netherlands	1	0	0	0	0	0	1	-	2011	2011
New Zealand	13	1	12	0	0	0	0	7.69	2010	2023
Pakistan	18	7	10	0	0	0	1	38.88	2009	2022
Scotland	1	1	0	0	0	0	0	100.00	2022	2022
South Africa	14	4	10	0	0	0	0	28.57	2012	2023
Thailand	2	1	1	0	0	0	0	50.0	2018	2022
United Arab Emirates	1	1	0	0	0	0	0	100.00	2022	2022
West Indies	23	4	18	0	0	0	1	18.18	2010	2018
Total	134	41	89	0	0	0	4	30.59	2009	2023
