= M. A. Chidambaram Stadium =

Cricket stadium in Chennai, India

- Chepauk Stadium
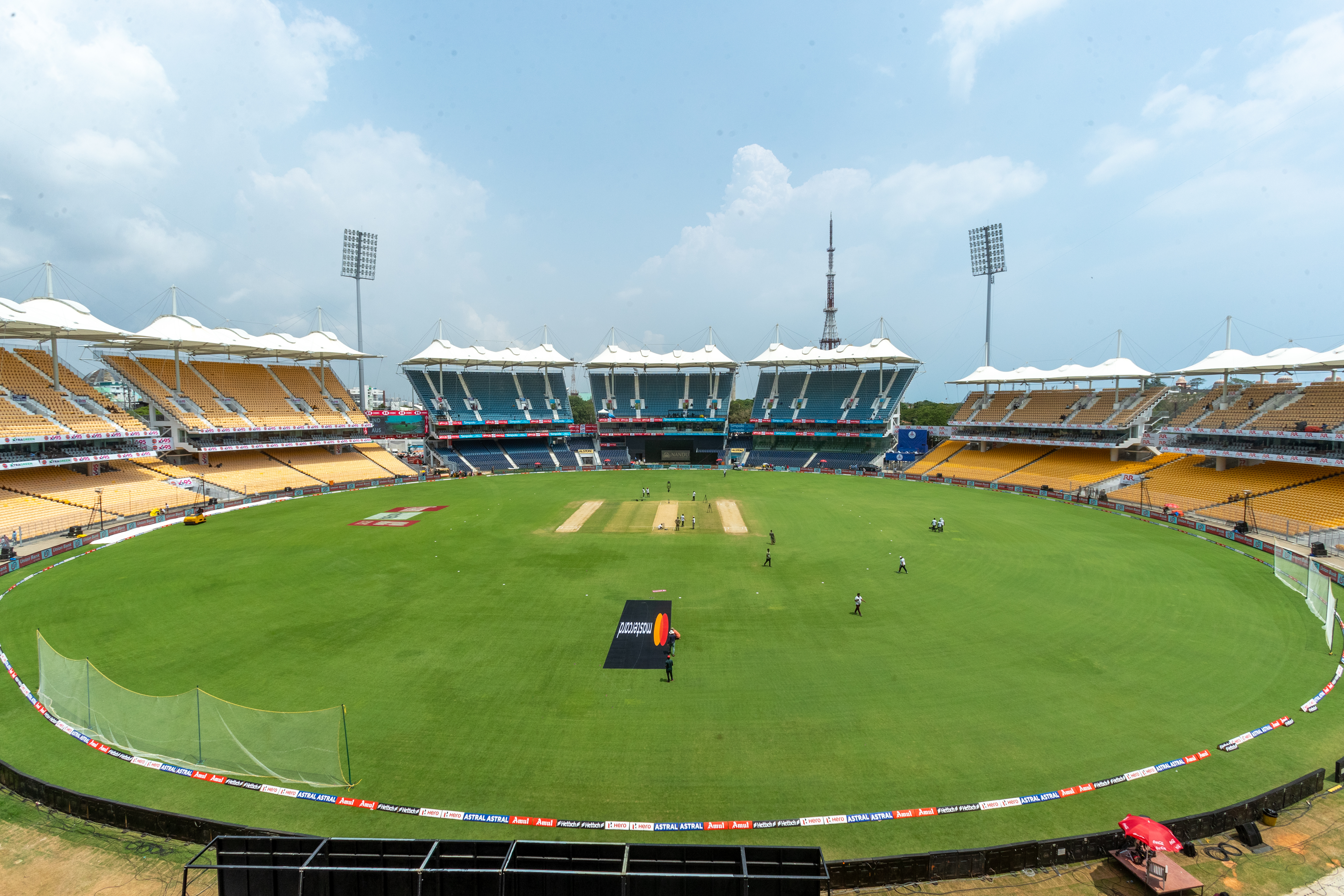
- M. A. Chidambaram Stadium in 2023
- Interactive map of M. A. Chidambaram Stadium

Ground information
- Location: Chepauk, Chennai, India
- Country: India
- Coordinates: 13°03′46″N 80°16′46″E
- Establishment: 1916; 110 years ago
- Capacity: 38,200
- Architect: East Coast Constructions; Hopkins Architects
- Operator: Tamil Nadu Cricket Association
- End names
- V. Pattabhiraman gate end Anna pavilion End

International information
- First men's Test: 10–13 February 1934: India v England
- Last men's Test: 19–23 September 2024: India v Bangladesh
- First men's ODI: 9 October 1987: India v Australia
- Last men's ODI: 20 June 2026: India v Afghanistan
- First men's T20I: 11 September 2012: India v New Zealand
- Last men's T20I: 26 February 2026: India v Zimbabwe
- First women's Test: 7–9 November 1976: India v West Indies
- Last women's Test: 28 June – 1 July 2024: India v South Africa
- First women's ODI: 23 February 1984: India v Australia
- Last women's ODI: 7 March 2007: Australia v New Zealand
- First women's T20I: 23 March 2016: South Africa v Ireland
- Last women's T20I: 9 July 2024: India v South Africa

Team information
India cricket team	(1934–)
India women's cricket team	(1997–)
Tamil Nadu cricket team	(1916–)
Tamil Nadu women's cricket team	(2006–)
Chennai Super Kings	(2008–)
Tamil Nadu Premier League	(2016–)
- As of 11 July 2026; Source: ESPNcricinfo

M. A. Chidambaram Stadium, commonly known as the Chepauk Stadium, is a cricket stadium in Chepauk, Chennai. It is named after M. A. Chidambaram, a former president of the Board of Control for Cricket in India, and managed by the Tamil Nadu Cricket Association (TNCA). It was established in 1916 and is the second oldest international cricket stadium in the country after Eden Gardens, which is still being used to host Test cricket.

The stadium hosts matches of the Indian cricket team and the Indian women's cricket team apart from conducting matches during major international cricketing events organised by the International Cricket Council. It serves as the home ground of the Tamil Nadu cricket team and Tamil Nadu women's cricket team for domestic matches. The Indian Premier League (IPL) team Chennai Super Kings plays its home matches at the stadium and the venue hosted the finals of the IPL in 2011, 2012, and 2024. It is also used as a venue for the Tamil Nadu Premier League, a Twenty20 tournament organised by the TNCA.

Chepauk hosted its first cricket match in February 1934, when India played a Test match against England during the latter's tour of India. It subsequently hosted the first match of the inaugural Ranji Trophy in November of the same year. The Indian cricket team recorded its first ever Test victory at the venue in a match against England in 1952. The venue was also the host of the second-ever tied Test in the history of the game during Australia's tour of India in 1986.

The Indian women's team played its second-ever Test match against the West Indies in November 1976 at Chepauk. The stadium hosted its first One Day International during the 1987 Cricket World Cup match between India and Australia. It subsequently served as one of the venues when India hosted the Cricket World Cup in 1996, 2011, 2023, as well as the 1997 Women's Cricket World Cup, and the 2026 Men's T20 World Cup. As of December 2025, the ground has hosted more than 85 international cricket matches.

== History ==
=== Early years ===
In 1846, a cricket ground designed by Henry Irwin was established by Alexander Arbuthnot in the Chepauk palace grounds. In 1859, the Madras Presidency acquired the Chepauk palace from the Nawab of Carnatic. In 1865, a new pavilion was constructed and it became the home of the Madras Cricket Club (MCC). The original Chisholm pavilion located in the southwestern corner of the ground was badly damaged in a cyclone in 1889, and a new pavilion was constructed to replace it in 1892. The new Irwin pavilion was built using Anglo-Indian architecture. The venue hosted a match between the touring Europeans and the Indian Presidency team in 1908. The stadium was formally established in 1916 when the Presidency matches were planned as an annual event.

=== International venue ===
Chepauk hosted its first Test cricket match in February 1934 during England's tour of India, which the visiting team won. It is the second oldest international cricket stadium in India that is still in use after Eden Gardens in Kolkata. It subsequently hosted the first match of the inaugural Ranji Trophy between Madras and Mysore in November of the same year. In 1946, the first attempts to build a larger stadium were made by Anthony De Mello. The proposal was accepted by the MCC subject to the approval of the Indian government. The stadium played host to the fifth Test of the series when England toured India in 1951-52. In February 1952, India recorded its first-ever Test win when it beat England by an innings and eight runs.

When M. A. Chidambaram became the president of the Madras Cricket Association (MCA) in 1956, the association wanted to occupy the ground permanently. However, the MCC was reluctant to loan the use of the ground, fearing that regular use would lead to deterioration of the facilities. Hence, after India's first Test victory in 1952, Test matches in Madras were hosted at the Corporation Stadium till January 1967. When the 30-year lease of the stadium held by the MCC ended in 1966, the MCA obtained the lease from the Madras government.

=== Permanent structure and renaming ===
The MCA changed its name to the Tamil Nadu Cricket Association (TNCA), after the state was renamed from Madras to Tamil Nadu. The TNCA wanted to build a permanent structure as the stadium. The foundation stone for the new stadium was laid in 1971. The Government of Tamil Nadu gave ₹1.5 million (US$16,000), Chidambaram donated a similar amount from his wealth, and the Madras Race Club donated ₹0.5 million (US$5,200). The remaining amount of ₹14 million (US$150,000) was borrowed from banks. The construction was completed in 1981.

From the late 1960s till the late 1980s, the stadium hosted a Test match in the second week of January, which was termed the Pongal Test, as it coincided with the Pongal harvest festival. The Indian women's team played their second-ever women's Test in November 1976 against the West Indies at Chepauk. The stadium was renamed from Madras Cricket Club Ground to M. A. Chidambaram Stadium in 1986. The venue was the host of the second-ever tied Test match in the history of the game during Australia's tour in 1986. The stadium hosted its first One Day International match between India and Australia during the 1987 Cricket World Cup. It further hosted matches during the subsequent 1996 Cricket World Cup and 1997 Women's Cricket World Cup.

=== Major venue and further upgrades ===
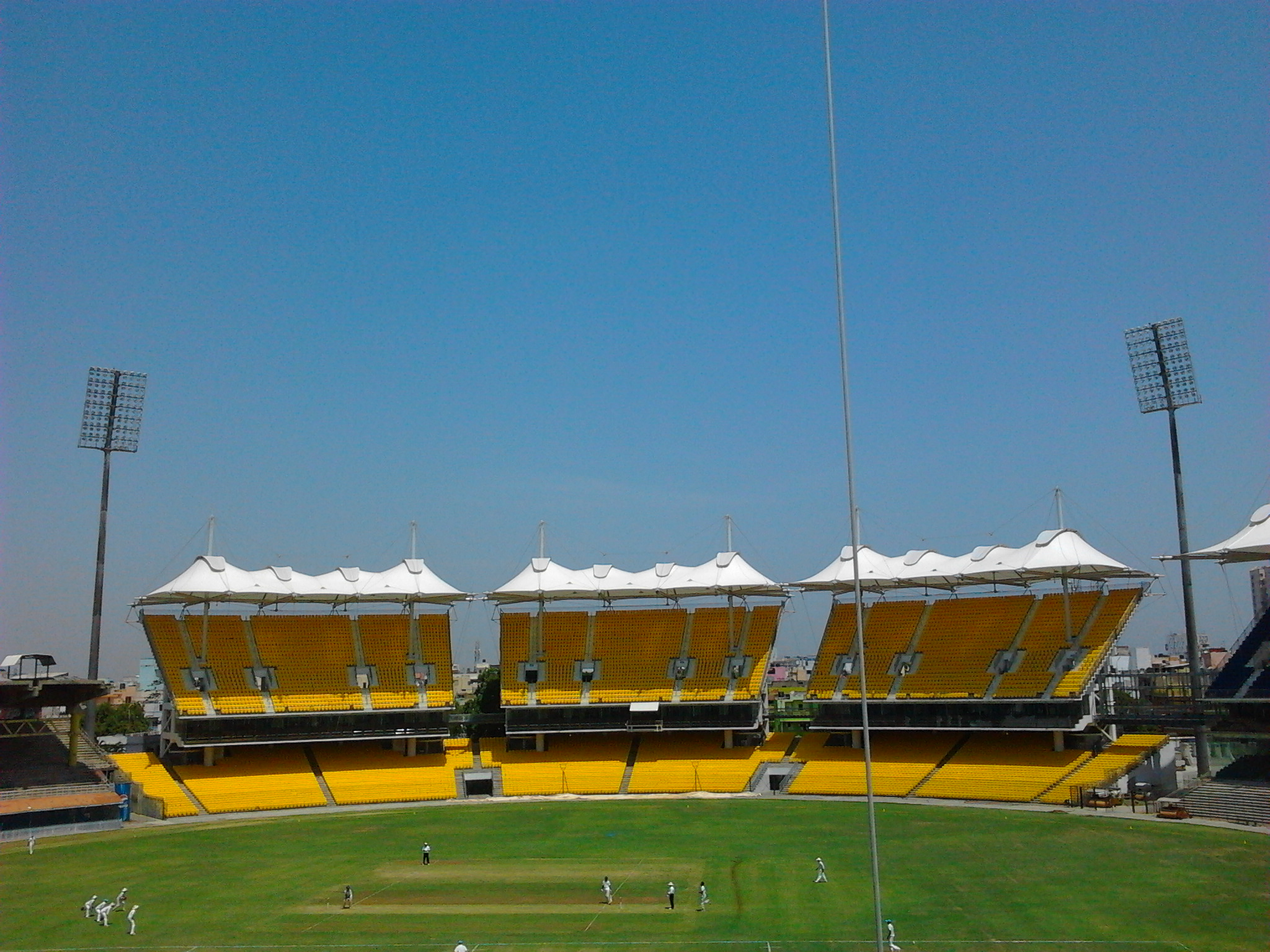
Renovated stands with fabric roofs

A major reconstruction project was undertaken at the cost of ₹1.75 billion (equivalent to ₹4.3 billion or US$44 million in 2026) in 2010, ahead of the 2011 Cricket World Cup. The plan consisted of constructing three new reinforced concrete stands which would accommodate an additional 12,000 spectators and add 24 hospitality boxes. The renovation also included the construction of translucent PTFE roofs to replace the roofs supported by pillars that blocked the view. The stadium hosted four matches during the 2011 Cricket World Cup, which was won by India.

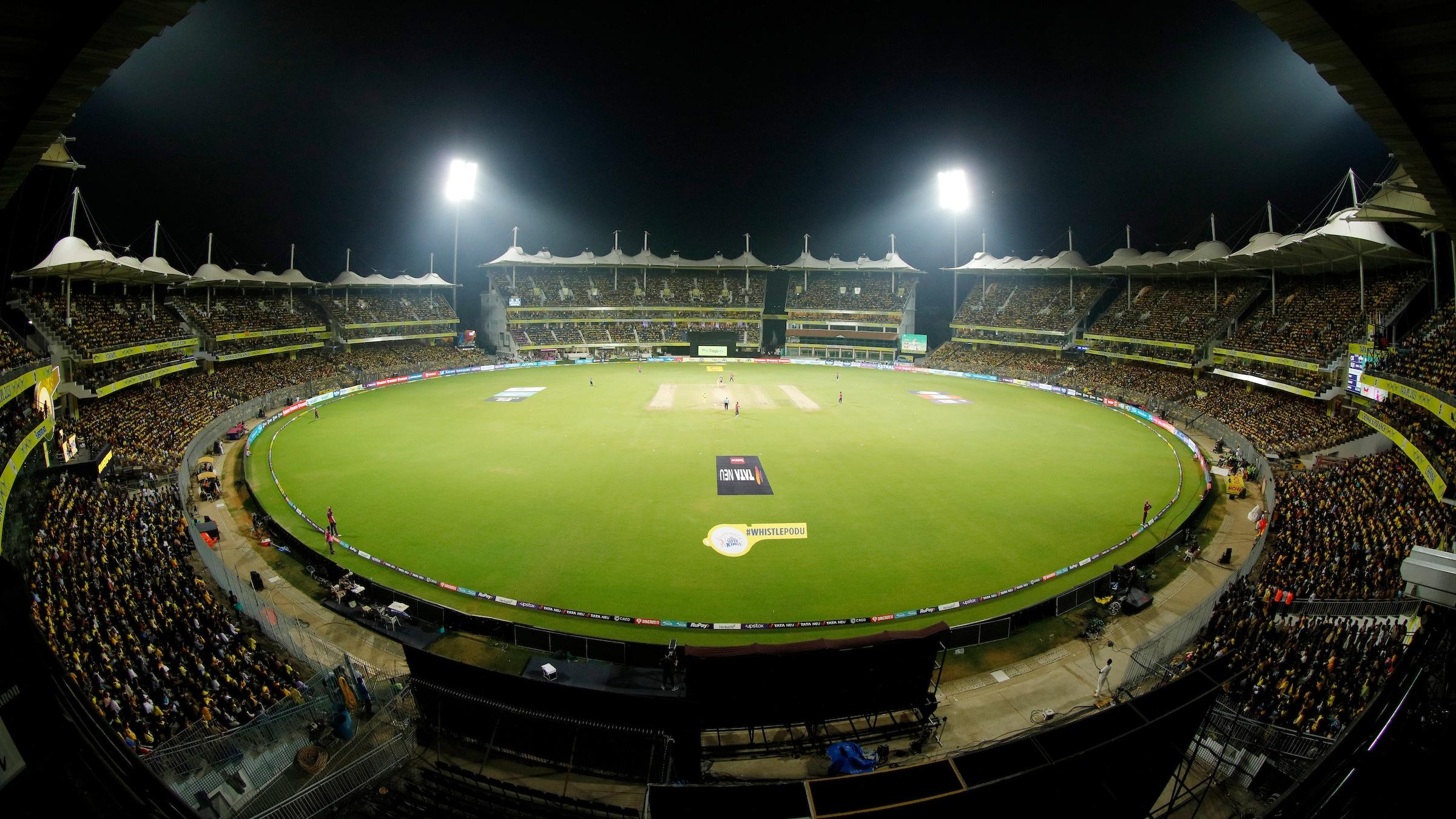
View of the stadium in 2023

On 31 March 2015, the Supreme Court of India ruled that the renovation violated regulations related to public safety. The court further ruled that parts of the renovation must be demolished and ordered the new stands to be sealed. The MCC gymnasium had to be demolished to adhere to the safety regulations laid down by the Greater Chennai Corporation. After the lease agreement between the government and the TNCA ended in 2016, the agreement was renewed in 2019 with revised conditions. The stands were finally de-sealed and opened in March 2020.

Further renovation works were planned in 2021, ahead of the 2023 Cricket World Cup. In December, the old Anna pavilion, some of the stands and the MCC clubhouse were demolished. The demolition temporarily reduced the capacity to 31,140. The renovations were done at a cost of ₹1.39 billion (US$14 million) and following its completion, the seating capacity was expanded to 38,000. The new stand which housed the Anna Pavilion was named after former chief minister M. Karunanidhi and was inaugurated on 17 March 2023. The stadium hosted five matches during the 2023 Cricket World Cup. In late 2025, the grass surface and the pitch were relaid as a part of planned renovation before the 2026 Men's T20 World Cup. The stadium was the venue for seven matches during the World Cup held in February 2026.

== Location and access ==
The stadium is located close to Marina Beach and can be accessed from Wallajah Road in the north, Bells Road in the west, and by Victoria Hostel Road, which runs parallel to the Buckingham Canal in the east. The Chennai MRTS line abuts the stadium and the Chepauk MRTS Railway Station is located to the south-east. Government Estate is the nearest station of the Chennai Metro.

== Notable records ==
- The stadium was one of the venues of India's first-ever home series against England in 1934.
- The first match of the inaugural Ranji Trophy was held on 4 November 1934 between Madras and Mysore at Chepauk.
- India recorded their first Test victory against England at Chepauk in February 1952.
- Sunil Gavaskar scored 30th Test century against West Indies in 1983, breaking the record for most centuries in Test cricket held by Don Bradman.
- The second-ever tied Test was played here between India and Australia in 1986.
- Narendra Hirwani took 8 wickets for 61 runs against the West Indies in January 1988, which are the best bowling figures by an Indian on Test debut, and the third best overall. His match figures of 16 wickets for 136 runs in the match are a record for any bowler on debut.
- Saeed Anwar of Pakistan scored 194 against India in 1997, then the highest individual score in ODIs.
- On 15 October 2004, Shane Warne surpassed Muttiah Muralitharan's tally of 532 Test wickets to become the highest wicket-taker during the time.
- Virender Sehwag scored 319 runs off 278 balls against South Africa in the home series in April 2008, the fastest triple century in Test history. He became only the third batsman to score two triple centuries in Test cricket. He scored 257 runs the third day of the match, the most scored by an individual batsman on a single day of a Test match since 1954. Rahul Dravid completed 10,000 Test runs in the same match.
- Sachin Tendulkar has scored the most Test runs of any other venue in India in Chepauk with 876 runs in nine Tests, at an average of 87.60.
- India scored 387/4 in the fourth innings of the first Test against England in December 2008, its second-highest run chase in Test cricket.
- In the final of the 2011 Indian Premier League (IPL) held at the venue, Chennai Super Kings defeated Royal Challengers Bengaluru to become the first team to win an IPL final at their home ground, and successfully defend an IPL title.
- M S Dhoni scored 224 in the first Test of the 2012–13 Border–Gavaskar Trophy against Australia on 24 February 2013. He became the first Indian wicket-keeper to score a double century in Test cricket.
- India scored 759 runs in their first innings of the fifth Test against England in the home series in December 2016, with Karun Nair scoring 303 not out. This was India's highest total in Test cricket, and Nair became the second Indian to score a triple century.
- Joe Root scored 218 runs in the first Test against India during England's tour of India in February 2021, which was the highest score by an English cricketer in India, and the highest score in the 100th Test of any individual.

== Statistics ==
=== Overall ===
Men's Test matches
Team	Pld	W	L	T	D
India	35	16	7	1	11
England	11	4	6	0	1
Australia	7	1	3	1	2
West Indies	7	1	4	0	2
Pakistan	4	1	1	0	2
New Zealand	2	0	1	0	1
Sri Lanka	2	0	0	0	2
South Africa	1	0	0	0	1
Bangladesh	1	0	0	1	0

Men's ODI matches
Team	Pld	W	L	T	NR
India	15	8	6	0	1
West Indies	7	2	5	0	0
Australia	7	5	2	0	0
New Zealand	6	3	2	0	1
England	3	2	1	0	0
Pakistan	4	2	2	0	0
Kenya	2	1	1	0	0
South Africa	3	1	2	0	0
Bangladesh	2	0	2	0	0
Afghanistan	2	1	1	0	0
Zimbabwe	1	0	1	0	0
Asia XI	2	2	0	0	0
Africa XI	2	0	2	0	0

Men's T20I matches
Team	Pld	W	L	T	NR
New Zealand	4	4	0	0	0
India	3	2	1	0	0
England	1	0	1	0	0
West Indies	1	0	1	0	0
Afghanistan	1	0	1	0	0
United Arab Emirates	1	0	1	0	0
United States	1	1	0	0	0
Netherlands	1	0	1	0	0
Canada	1	0	1	0	0

Women's Test Matches
Team	Pld	W	L	T	D
India	2	1	0	0	1
West Indies	1	0	0	0	1
South Africa	1	0	1	0	0

Women's ODI matches
Team	Pld	W	L	T	NR
India	8	4	4	0	0
Australia	4	3	1	0	0
New Zealand	4	3	1	0	0
England	4	0	4	0	0
Ireland	1	1	0	0	0
Denmark	1	0	1	0	0

Women's T20I matches
Team	Pld	W	L	T	NR
South Africa	4	2	1	0	1
India	3	1	1	0	1
Pakistan	2	0	2	0	0
West Indies	2	2	0	0	0
Bangladesh	1	0	1	0	0
England	1	1	0	0	0
Ireland	1	0	1	0	0

=== Individual ===
Most Test runs
Runs	Player	Period
1018	(India) Sunil Gavaskar	1973–1987
970	(India) Sachin Tendulkar	1993–2013
785	(India) Gundappa Viswanath	1969–1982
729	(India) Virender Sehwag	2002–2013
708	(India) Kapil Dev	1979–1993

Highest individual scores in Tests
Runs	Player	Opposition	Year
319	(India) Virender Sehwag	South Africa	2008
303*	(India) Karun Nair	England	2016
236*	(India) Sunil Gavaskar	West Indies	1983
224	(India) MS Dhoni	Australia	2013
222	(India) Gundappa Viswanath	England	1982

Most Test wickets
Wickets	Player	Period
48	(India) Anil Kumble	1993–2008
42	(India) Harbhajan Singh	2001–2013
40	(India) Kapil Dev	1979–1993
36	(India) Ravichandran Ashwin	2013–2024
36	(India) Erapalli Prasanna	1967–1977

Best individual figures in Tests
Figures	Player	Opposition	Year
8/55	(India) Vinoo Mankad	England	1952
8/61	(India) Narendra Hirwani	West Indies	1988
8/75	(India) Narendra Hirwani	West Indies	1988
8/84	(India) Harbhajan Singh	Australia	2001
7/48	(India) Anil Kumble	Australia	2004

== Notable matches ==
This stadium has hosted 12 men's one-day matches across four Cricket World Cups, a single WODI match during the 1997 Women's Cricket World Cup, and seven T20I matches during the 2026 Men's T20 World Cup.

=== Cricket World Cup ===
==== 1987 Cricket World Cup ====
9 October 1987
Scorecard

Australia; 270/6 (50 overs)	v	India; 269 (49.5 overs)
Geoff Marsh 110 (141); Manoj Prabhakar 2/47 (10 overs)		Navjot Sidhu 73 (79); Craig McDermott 4/56 (10 overs)

Australia won by 1 run
Umpires: David Archer and Dickie Bird
Player of the match: Geoff Marsh

13 October 1987
Scorecard

Australia; 235/9 (50 overs)	v	Zimbabwe; 139 (49.4 overs)
Allan Border 67 (88); Kevin Curran 2/29 (8 overs)		Kevin Curran 30 (38); Simon O'Donnell 4/39 (9.4 overs)

Australia won by 96 runs
Umpires: Khizer Hayat and David Shepherd
Player of the match: Steve Waugh

==== 1996 Cricket World Cup ====
11 March 1996
Scorecard

New Zealand; 286/9 (50 overs)	v	Australia; 289/4 (47.5 overs)
Chris Harris 130 (124); Glenn McGrath 2/50 (9 overs)		Mark Waugh 110 (112); Dion Nash 1/44 (9 overs)

Australia won by 6 wickets
Umpires: Cyril Mitchley and S. Venkataraghavan
Player of the match: Mark Waugh

==== 2011 Cricket World Cup ====
20 February 2011
Scorecard

Kenya; 69 (23.5 overs)	v	New Zealand; 72/0 (8 overs)
Rakep Patel 16 (23); Hamish Bennett 4/16 (5 overs)		Martin Guptill 39* (32); Thomas Odoyo 0/25 (3 overs)

New Zealand won by 10 wickets
Umpires: Marais Erasmus and Rod Tucker
Player of the match: Hamish Bennett

6 March 2011
Scorecard

England; 171 (45.4 overs)	v	South Africa; 165 (47.4 overs)
Ravi Bopara 60 (98); Imran Tahir 4/38 (8.4 overs)		Hashim Amla 42 (51); Stuart Broad 4/15 (6.4 overs)

England won by 6 runs
Umpires: Simon Taufel and Amiesh Saheba
Player of the match: Ravi Bopara

17 March 2011 (D/N)
Scorecard

England; 243 (48.4 overs)	v	West Indies; 225 (44.4 overs)
Jonathan Trott 47 (38); Andre Russell 4/49 (8 overs)		Andre Russell 49 (46); James Tredwell 4/48 (10 overs)

England won by 18 runs
Umpires: Bruce Oxenford and Steve Davis
Player of the match: James Tredwell

20 March 2011 (D/N)
Scorecard

India; 268 (49.1 overs)	v	West Indies; 188 (43 overs)
Yuvraj Singh 113 (123); Ravi Rampaul 5/51 (10 overs)		Devon Smith 81 (97); Zaheer Khan 3/26 (6 overs)

India won by 80 runs
Umpires: Simon Taufel and Steve Davis
Player of the match: Yuvraj Singh

==== 2023 Cricket World Cup ====
8 October 2023
14:00 (D/N)
Scorecard

Australia; 199 (49.3 overs)	v	India; 201/4 (41.2 overs)
Steve Smith 46 (71); Ravindra Jadeja 3/28 (10 overs)		KL Rahul 97* (115); Josh Hazlewood 3/38 (9 overs)

India won by 6 wickets
Umpires: Chris Gaffaney (NZ) and Richard Kettleborough (Eng)
Player of the match: KL Rahul (Ind)

- Australia won the toss and elected to bat first

13 October 2023
14:00 (D/N)
Scorecard

Bangladesh; 245/9 (50 overs)	v	New Zealand; 248/2 (42.5 overs)
Mushfiqur Rahim 66 (75); Lockie Ferguson 3/49 (10 overs)		Daryl Mitchell 89* (67); Mustafizur Rahman 1/36 (10 overs)

New Zealand won by 8 wickets
Umpires: Kumar Dharmasena (SL) and Nitin Menon (Ind)
Player of the match: Lockie Ferguson (NZ)

- New Zealand won the toss and elected to field first

18 October 2023
14:00 (D/N)
Scorecard

New Zealand; 288/6 (50 overs)	v	Afghanistan; 139 (34.4 overs)
Glenn Phillips 71 (80); Naveen-ul-Haq 2/48 (8 overs)		Rahmat Shah 36 (62); Lockie Ferguson 3/19 (7 overs)

New Zealand Won by 149 runs
Umpires: Joel Wilson (WI) and Paul Wilson (Aus)
Player of the match: Glenn Phillips (NZ)

- Afghanistan won the toss and elected to field.

23 October 2023
14:00 (D/N)
Scorecard

Pakistan; 282/7 (50 overs)	v	Afghanistan; 286/2 (49 overs)
Babar Azam 74 (92); Noor Ahmad 3/49 (10 overs)		Ibrahim Zadran 87 (113); Hasan Ali 1/44 (10 overs)

Afghanistan Won by 8 Wickets
Umpires: Paul Reiffel (Aus) and Rod Tucker (Aus)
Player of the match: Ibrahim Zadran (Afg)

- Pakistan won the toss and elected to bat.
- This was Afghanistan's first win against Pakistan in international cricket.

27 October 2023
14:00 (D/N)
Scorecard

Pakistan; 270 (46.4 overs)	v	South Africa; 271/9 (47.2 overs)
Saud Shakeel 52 (52); Tabraiz Shamsi 4/60 (10 overs)		Aiden Markram 91 (93); Shaheen Afridi 3/45 (10 overs)

South Africa won by 1 wicket
Umpires: Paul Reiffel (Aus) and Alex Wharf (Eng)
Player of the match: Tabraiz Shamsi (SA)

- Pakistan won the toss and elected to bat.
- Usama Mir (Pak) replaced Shadab Khan as a concussion substitute during the second innings of the match.

=== Women's Cricket World Cup ===
==== 1997 Women's Cricket World Cup ====
26 December 1997
Scorecard

New Zealand; 175/6 (50 overs)	v	England; 155 (47.5 overs)
Debbie Hockley 43 (104); Karen Smithies 3/40 (10 overs)		Janette Brittin 32 (88); Clare Nicholson 2/29 (10 overs)

New Zealand Women won by 20 runs
Umpires: N Muralidaran and P Venkatesan
Player of the match: Debbie Hockley (NZ)

- New Zealand women won the toss and elected to bat

=== Men's T20 World Cup ===
==== 2026 Men's T20 World Cup ====
8 February 2026
11:00
Scorecard

Afghanistan; 182/6 (20 overs)	v	New Zealand; 183/5 (17.5 overs)
Gulbadin Naib 63 (35); Lockie Ferguson 2/40 (4 overs)		Tim Seifert 65 (42); Mujeeb Ur Rahman 2/31 (4 overs)

New Zealand won by 5 wickets
Umpires: Langton Rusere (Zim) and Alex Wharf (Eng)
Player of the match: Tim Seifert (NZ)

- Afghanistan won the toss and elected to bat.
- Gulbadin Naib (Afg) scored his 1,000th run in T20Is.
- Tim Seifert (NZ) scored his 2,000th run in T20Is.
- This was New Zealand's highest run chase in the T20 World Cup.

10 February 2026
15:00 (D/N)
Scorecard

United Arab Emirates; 173/6 (20 overs)	v	New Zealand; 175/0 (15.2 overs)
Muhammad Waseem 66* (45); Matt Henry 2/37 (4 overs)		Tim Seifert 89* (42)

New Zealand won by 10 wickets
Umpires: Paul Reiffel (Aus) and Roland Black (Ire)
Player of the match: Tim Seifert (NZ)

- United Arab Emirates won the toss and elected to bat.
- This was the UAE's highest innings total in the T20 World Cup (173).
- Tim Seifert and Finn Allen (NZ) both hit their 100th six in T20Is.
- Tim Seifert and Finn Allen's 175-run partnership was the highest partnership ever in the T20 World Cup.
- This was New Zealand's fourth 10-wicket win in T20Is and the seventh overall in T20 World Cups.

13 February 2026
19:00 (N)
Scorecard

United States; 196/6 (20 overs)	v	Netherlands; 103 (15.5 overs)
Saiteja Mukkamalla 79 (51); Bas de Leede 3/37 (4 overs)		Bas de Leede 23 (17); Harmeet Singh Baddhan 4/21 (4 overs)

United States won by 93 runs
Umpires: K. N. Ananthapadmanabhan (Ind) and Nitin Menon (Ind)
Player of the match: Harmeet Singh Baddhan (USA)

- Netherlands won the toss and elected to field.
- This was the largest winning margin in a T20 World Cup match by an associate member.

15 February 2026
15:00 (D/N)
Scorecard

United States; 199/4 (20 overs)	v	Namibia; 168/6 (20 overs)
Sanjay Krishnamurthi 68* (33); Willem Myburgh 2/22 (4 overs)		Louren Steenkamp 58 (39); Shadley van Schalkwyk 2/30 (4 overs)

United States won by 31 runs
Umpires: K. N. Ananthapadmanabhan (Ind) and Sharfuddoula (Ban)
Player of the match: Sanjay Krishnamurthi (USA)

- United States won the toss and elected to bat.
- Monank Patel (USA) became the first player for the United States to score 1000 runs in T20Is.
- Zane Green (Nam) became the first player to be retired out in the 2026 tournament and second overall in the T20 World Cup history.

17 February 2026
11:00
Scorecard

Canada; 173/4 (20 overs)	v	New Zealand; 176/2 (15.1 overs)
Yuvraj Samra 110 (65); Jacob Duffy 1/25 (4 overs)		Glenn Phillips 76* (36); Saad Bin Zafar 1/29 (3 overs)

New Zealand won by 8 wickets
Umpires: Jayaraman Madanagopal (Ind) and Sharfuddoula (Ban)
Player of the match: Glenn Phillips (NZ)

- Canada won the toss and elected to bat.
- This was the first time Canada and New Zealand faced each other in T20Is.
- Yuvraj Samra and Dilpreet Bajwa's 116-run partnership is the highest for any wicket for Canada in the T20 World Cup.
- Yuvraj Samra became the youngest player to score a century in the history of the Men's T20 World Cup and the first player from an associate nation to score a century in a T20 World Cup.

19 February 2026
19:00 (N)
Scorecard

Afghanistan; 200/4 (20 overs)	v	Canada; 118/8 (20 overs)
Ibrahim Zadran 95* (56); Jaskaran Singh 3/52 (4 overs)		Harsh Thaker 30 (24); Mohammad Nabi 4/7 (4 overs)

Afghanistan won by 82 runs
Umpires: Nitin Menon (Ind) and Gazi Sohel (Ban)
Player of the match: Ibrahim Zadran (Afg)

- Canada won the toss and elected to field.

26 February 2026
19:00 (N)
Scorecard

India; 256/4 (20 overs)	v	Zimbabwe; 184/6 (20 overs)
Abhishek Sharma 55 (30); Sikandar Raza 1/29 (3 overs)		Brian Bennett 97* (59); Arshdeep Singh 3/24 (4 overs)

India won by 72 runs
Umpires: Richard Kettleborough (Eng) and Alex Wharf (Eng)
Player of the match: Hardik Pandya (Ind)

- Zimbabwe won the toss and elected to field.
- Suryakumar Yadav (Ind) completed 4,000 international runs during the match.
- India recorded its highest total and the second highest total ever in T20 World Cups.
- India recorded the highest T20I total at the M.A. Chidambaram Stadium.

== See also ==
- List of international cricket grounds in India
- List of stadiums in India
- List of cricket grounds by capacity
