= Ruksana Khan =

Pakistani cricketer (born 1981)

Personal information
- Full name: Ruksana Parveen Khan
- Born: 4 January 1981 (age 45); Pakistan
- Role: Bowler

International information
- National side: Pakistan (1997)
- ODI debut (cap 16): 10 December 1997 v Denmark
- Last ODI: 18 December 1997 v Ireland

Career statistics
Competition	WODI
Matches	5
Runs scored	1
Batting average	0.25
100s/50s	0/0
Top score	1
Balls bowled	54
Wickets	2
Bowling average	25.50
5 wickets in innings	0
10 wickets in match	0
Best bowling	2/43
Catches/stumpings	1/–
- Source: CricketArchive, 8 January 2022

Ruksana Parveen Khan (born 4 January 1981) is a Pakistani former cricketer who played as a bowler. She appeared in 5 Women's One Day Internationals (WODIs) for Pakistan, all at the 1997 World Cup. She made her WODI debut against Denmark on 10 December 1997.

Against South Africa, she bowled eight overs and took 2 wickets for 43 runs, her only WODI wickets.
