= Southerners Sports Club =

Southerners Sports Club logo featuring a Kiwi, Springbok and Kangaroo

The Southerners Sports Club is an informal, non-commercial Bangkok-based club of expats and Thais. The Southerners field teams in Bangkok's local rugby, netball, touch rugby (men's, women's and mixed) and cricket competitions, and also tour to neighbouring countries for regional-based sports tournaments.

The club aims to provide a relaxed atmosphere in both sporting and social contexts.

== History ==
In October 1994, New Zealand Rugby side Taradale RFC were looking to tour Thailand and play in a four-way rugby sevens tournament alongside teams from Thailand, Guam and Taiwan. A group of Australians and New Zealanders, on seeing they could field a sevens side, agreed to help organize the tournament, entering a Thailand team they decided to call "The Southerners".

Former New Zealand All Black Zinzan Brooke, who was in Bangkok doing a TV commercial for Thai Airways, was co-opted by the fledgling Southerners team to compete in the inaugural game. Coincidentally, Taradale RFC also featured All Black Dallas Seymour in their team list. The competition proved a success with Taradale edging out the Southerners to win the tournament.

The Southerners were later officially established on 3 November 1994 when the Club's registration was accepted by the Thai Rugby Union and were approved to enter the British Council Cup Competition (Division 1).

In September 2005, the Ambassadors to Thailand of Australia, New Zealand, South Africa and the United Kingdom sponsored the 'Ambassadors Cup', a three-match rugby series between the Southerners Sports Club and the British Club.

The Southerners Sports Club has been sponsored by Crown Worldwide Group since 2001.

== Club milestones ==
- 3 November 1994 - Southerners officially established with registration by the Thai Rugby Union
- October 1995 - 140 Southerners members
- August 1996 - Southerners enter the Thai Cricket League
- March 1997 - Southerners conduct first overseas tour to Hong Kong 7's rugby tournament
- June 1997 - Southerners touch rugby section formed
- March 1998 - Club constitution is approved by members
- August 2002 - Southerners enter Bangkok Netball League
- September 2005 - Inaugural Ambassador's Cup rugby match played against the Bangkok British Club
- August 2014 - Signed Matt Waugh, future immortal. (Rugby)
- 2017 - Signed William Dennis, Luxembourg International Test Player (15 caps)
- 2021 - Signed Corry McCarthy (Bective Rangers IRL & part of the infamous Edenderry 13)

== Rugby section ==
The foundation team for the Southerners Sports Club, the rugby section has become a magnet for both experienced players, as well as non-players and those with backgrounds in Gaelic and Australian Rules Football, rugby league and wrestling.

Southerners compete yearly in the Thailand Rugby Union competition, as well as in local and international rugby tournaments spanning 7's, 10's and 15's formats. The Southerners recently competed in the 2008 Bangkok International 7s and 2009 Bangkok International 10's Rugby competitions.

== Netball section ==
The Southerners netball section competes in the Bangkok Netball League, having had strong success in the League, as well as in local and international tournaments and the Thai National Championships.

== Touch rugby section ==
Sporting women's, men's and mixed teams, the Southerners touch rugby section competes in local and international touch rugby tournaments and holds intra-club touch rugby games most weekends in Bangkok.

The original Southerners touch team was known as the "Southern Soul Sisters".

== Cricket section ==
The Southerners currently field two teams, one in each of the two Bangkok Cricket League grades, as well as a third team for ad-hoc social matches.

Southerners' cricket section competes in approximately ten to twelve games in a season, played during the cooler, drier months of November–April, with the final series played around March–April.

== Diversity ==
Membership of the Southerners has included players from Thailand, Germany, Japan, Ireland, Switzerland, the UK, USA, Australia, France, the Netherlands, New Zealand, South Africa and Canada.

== Results & achievements ==
=== Rugby ===
- October 2015 - Champions, Cup and Plate, Asia Rugby League 9's - Southerners and Southerners Stars (Phuket)
- October 2015 - Champions, Thai National Rugby League 9's (Bangkok)
- May 2015 - Champions, Chris Kays Memorial Rugby Tournament - Pattaya 10s
- January 2015 - Champions, Laos 10s
- November 2014 - Champions, Angkor 10s, Dis is Kamboj
- June 2011 - Champions, Byron Kelleher Charity 7's, Bangkok
- October 2009 - Runners up, Angkor 10s, Cambodia
- July 2009 - Semi-finalists, Thailand Rugby Union competition
- January 2009 - Semi-finalists, Bangkok RBSC 7's
- January 2009 - Semi-finalists (undefeated), Laos international 10's tournament
- November 2008 - Semi-finalists, Thailand Rugby Union competition
- April 2008 - 2nd, Pattaya 10s tournament
- February 2007 - 2nd, Bangkok International 10s

=== Netball ===
- 2009 - Runners Up, Round 1/ Division 1, Bangkok Netball League (Southerners Black)
- 2008 - Runners Up, Southerners SE Asian Invitational Tournament, Bangkok
- 2008 - Champions, Round 2/ Division 1, Bangkok Netball League (Southerners Black)
- 2008 - Runners up, Round 2/ Division 2, Bangkok Netball League (Southerners White)
- 2007 - Runners Up, Round 1/ Division 1, Bangkok Netball League (Southerners Black)
- 2006 - Runners Up, Thailand Nationals Competition (Southerners Black)
- 2006 - Champions, Division 1, Bangkok Netball League (Southerners Black)
- 2006 - Runners up, Division 2, Bangkok Netball League (Southerners White)

=== Touch rugby ===
- 2010 - Champions, Asian Touch Tournament, Hanoi
- 2007 - Champions, Pattaya Women's Touch
- 2005 - Mixed Team Champions, Bangkok Touch League

=== Cricket ===
- October 2008 - Winners (Plate), Thailand International Cricket Sixes Tournament
- 2004 - Tied Winners (Plate), Chiang Mai International Cricket Sixes. Both Southerners and Ashwell Crusaders scored 2/74 (the first ever tie at the Chiang Mai Sixes).
- 1998-1999 - Champions, Thailand Cricket League 50-over competition

== Social ==
The Southerners are known in Bangkok expat circles as being an inclusive, relaxed and extremely social club. In addition to regular weekend gatherings and local and international sports tours, the Southerners hold organised annual events including the Southerners Ball, Khao San Road Tour and Southerners Race Day.

== Founding members ==
- First Rugby coach Kiwi, Peter Fox
- First Rugby captain Aussie, Paul Cummins
- First Cricket captain Aussie, David Dufall
- First Touch captain Kiwi, John Kowalczeck
- First Netball captain Kiwi, Emma Perry

== Prominent current and former club members ==
- Rayner Blitz, Former English first-class cricketer
- Damian Hoo, Former QLD Reds rugby & Australian Big Brother 2002 first evictee
- Zinzan Brooke, New Zealand All Black and Captain
- Chris Doherty, Former Thailand National Rugby representative
- Pete Murray, Australian singer-songwriter and former QLD rugby sevens representative

== Club houses ==
The Southerners' first club house was located in the upstairs area of the Moonshine Bar. Due to the location of the Moonshine Bar, the Southerners changed their base to Delaney's Pub, then changed again to 'The Bat Cave' in The Londoner Brew Pub on Sukhumvit Soi 33. The Southerners recently signed a new sponsorship deal with The Clubhouse on Sukhumvit Soi 23 that has meant this is our new home.
