= Eklavya Sports Stadium =

Cricket stadium in India

- Interactive map of Eklavya Sports Stadium
- Full name: Eklavya Sports Stadium
- Location: Agra, Uttar Pradesh
- Coordinates: 27.1608°N 78.0087°E
- Owner: Agra Municipal Corporation
- Operator: Agra Municipal Corporation
- Capacity: 5,000

Construction
- Groundbreaking: 1990
- Opened: 1990

Website
- ESPNcricinfo

Eklavya Sports Stadium is cricket stadium located in Agra, Uttar Pradesh state of India. The stadium is named after very famous student of India at the time of "Mahabharata", Eklavya.

The ground has floodlights so that the stadium can host day-night matches. It is made considering all norms of BCCI so that Ranji Trophy matches can be played. The stadium was established in 2008 when they hosted a match of Vijay Merchant Trophy between Uttar Pradesh Under-16s and Rajasthan Under-16s.

The stadium has hosted a Women's ODI match between Netherlands women's national cricket team and West Indies women's cricket team in Hero Honda Women's World Cup 1997. But the match was abandoned match in which no play was possible.

== One Day International Hosted ==
The stadium has hosted following ODI matches till date.

Team (A)	Team (B)	Winner	Margin	Year	Note
Netherlands	West Indies	Abandoned		1997	
