= Lucas Brooke =

English rugby union player

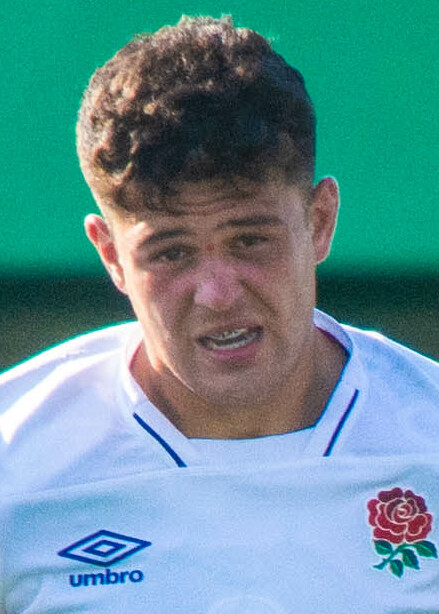
- Brooke in 2022
- Born: 18 January 2002 (age 24)
- Height: 184 cm (6 ft 0 in)
- Weight: 98 kg (216 lb)
- School: Wellington College, Berkshire
- University: Exeter University
- Notable relatives: Zinzan Brooke (father); Robin Brooke (uncle)

Rugby union career
- Position: Back row
Amateur team(s)
| Years | Team | Apps | (Points) |
| – | Exeter University RFC | | |
Senior career
| Years | Team | Apps | (Points) |
| 2020- | London Irish | | |
| 2022 | Rams RFC (loan) | | |
| 2023 | Richmond F.C. (loan) | | |
International career
| Years | Team | Apps | (Points) |
| 2021- | England U20 | | |

Lucas Brooke (born 18 January 2002) is a rugby union player who played for London Irish, before the club collapsed. He is currently studying at Exeter University, and playing for Exeter Uni RFC with the hope of following the pathway and playing for Exeter Chiefs. He can play across the back row.

== Early life ==
Brooke, grew up in England and attended St Johns Beaumont then Wellington College. He played rugby for Berkshire at county level.

== Career ==
Brooke joined the London Irish Academy aged 13. He also played in youth rugby teams for Windsor Rugby Club from the age of five years-old where his father was a rugby coach. He signed a professional contract with London Irish in May 2020.

=== 2021–22 ===
During the 2021-22 season, Brooke made his London Irish senior debut when he started against Leicester Tigers in the Premiership Rugby Cup, scoring a try in a 41-26 defeat.

=== 2022–23 ===
In 2022, he went on loan to National League 1 side Rams RFC, making his debut on November 11 against Plymouth Albion. In 2023, he went on loan to Richmond RFC, making his debut on March 8, 2023 against Ealing Trailfinders. Between the loans, he also played for London Irish against Bath Rugby in January 2023.

== International career ==
He made his England national under-20 rugby union team debut in the 2021 Under-20 Six Nations. He scored a debut try in a 38-22 win over France under-20s on June 19, 2021. He continued to be selected by the England U20 side in 2022.

== Personal life ==
Born in England, to Alison Brooke, cheerleader for Auckland Blues when younger . He is the son of acclaimed New Zealand rugby union international Zinzan Brooke and nephew of fellow former international player Robin Brooke.
