= Robin Brooke =

New Zealand rugby union player

- Born: Robin Matthew Brooke; 10 December 1966 (age 59) Warkworth, New Zealand
- Height: 1.97 m (6 ft 5 1/2 in)
- Weight: 109 kg (17 st 2 lb)
- School: Mahurangi College
- Notable relatives: Zinzan Brooke (brother); Lucas Brooke (nephew)

Rugby union career
- Position: Lock
Provincial / State sides
Years	Team	Apps	(Points)
1987–2001	Auckland		
- Correct as of pdate
Super Rugby
Years	Team	Apps	(Points)
1996–2001	Blues		
International career
Years	Team	Apps	(Points)
1992–99	New Zealand	62	(20)
–	New Zealand Māori		

Robin Matthew Brooke (born 10 December 1966 in Warkworth, New Zealand) is a former New Zealand rugby player. He played for the New Zealand national rugby union team in the 1990s, playing many tests alongside brother Zinzan Brooke.

== Career ==
Brooke played representative rugby for Auckland, and made his All Blacks debut in June 1992 against Ireland.

Brooke was selected as one of the "Five promising players" from the 1987 season, in the 1988 Rugby Almanack of New Zealand and as one of the “Five players of the year” for the 1995 season, in the 1996 Rugby Almanack.

He played 69 games for the New Zealand national rugby union team, 62 of them tests, and scored 4 tries, all in tests. Brooke captained the Blues in the Super 12 of 2000 and 2001 and was in the Auckland NPC sides in those two seasons before retiring at the end of the 2001 season.

== Personal life ==
Born in Warkworth, Brooke attended Mahurangi College. His older brothers Zinzan Brooke and Marty Brooke were also notable rugby players.

As of 2010, he owned a New World supermarket in Warkworth, New Zealand.

In 2010, Brooke made a televised apology for allegedly groping a 15-year-old girl and grabbing her male friend by the throat whilst on holiday in Fiji. As part of a settlement he also made a contribution to charity and agreed to attend alcohol counselling.

Awards
Preceded by Zinzan Brooke	Tom French Memorial; Māori rugby union player of the year 1995	Succeeded by Errol Brain
