= Zin Harris =

New Zealand cricketer

- Zin Harris in 1961–62

Personal information
- Full name: Parke Gerald Zinzan Harris
- Born: 18 July 1927; Christchurch, Canterbury
- Died: 1 December 1991 (aged 64); Christchurch, Canterbury
- Batting: Right-handed
- Bowling: Right-arm medium
- Role: Batsman
- Relatives: Ben Harris (son); Chris Harris (son)

International information
- National side: New Zealand (1955–1965)
- Test debut (cap 72): 13 October 1955 v Pakistan
- Last Test: 29 January 1965 v Pakistan

Domestic team information
- Years: Team
- 1949/50–1963/64: Canterbury

Career statistics
Competition	Test	First-class
Matches	9	69
Runs scored	378	3,126
Batting average	22.23	28.16
100s/50s	1/1	5/13
Top score	101	118
Balls bowled	42	1,818
Wickets	0	21
Bowling average	–	30.80
5 wickets in innings	–	0
10 wickets in match	–	0
Best bowling	–	3/8
Catches/stumpings	6/–	37/–
- Source: CricInfo, 17 October 2015

Parke Gerald Zinzan "Zin" Harris (18 July 1927 – 1 December 1991) was a New Zealand cricketer who played in nine Test matches between 1955 and 1965.

Harris was a member of the New Zealand team that toured South Africa in 1961–62 and drew the series two-all. He was New Zealand's top scorer, with 101 and 30, in the Third Test at Cape Town, which was New Zealand's first overseas Test victory.

Harris had two sons who played first-class cricket: Chris Harris, who went on to represent New Zealand, and Ben Harris who played for Canterbury and Otago. The unusual name of Zinzan – thought to be of Indian origin – is shared by several members of the Harris and related families: both Chris and Ben Harris have Zinzan as a middle name.
