= Ben Harris (cricketer) =

New Zealand cricketer

Personal information
- Full name: Ben Zinzan Harris
- Born: 20 February 1964 (age 62); Christchurch, Canterbury, New Zealand
- Batting: Right-handed
- Bowling: Right-arm medium
- Role: Batsman
- Relatives: Zin Harris (father); Chris Harris (brother)

Domestic team information
- Years: Team
- 1988/89: Canterbury
- 1989/90–1990/91: Otago
- 1991/92–1994/95: Canterbury
- FC debut: 29 January 1989 Canterbury v Pakistanis
- Last FC: 14 December 1995 Canterbury v Northern Districts
- LA debut: 31 December 1991 Canterbury v Northern Districts
- Last LA: 18 December 1994 Canterbury v Northern Districts

Career statistics
Competition	First-class	List A
Matches	35	15
Runs scored	1,577	163
Batting average	22.72	20.37
100s/50s	3/5	0/1
Top score	141*	55*
Balls bowled	536	138
Wickets	6	8
Bowling average	48.83	58.00
5 wickets in innings	0	0
10 wickets in match	0	0
Best bowling	3/13	2/19
Catches/stumpings	28/–	2/–
- Source: CricInfo, 8 May 2009

Ben Zinzan Harris (born 20 February 1964) is a New Zealand former cricketer. He played first class cricket for Canterbury and Otago between the 1988–89 season and 1994–95. A right-handed batsman and right-arm medium bowler, Harris played 35 first-class matches and 15 List A matches, scoring over 1,500 first-class runs at a batting average of 26.72 runs per inning, including scoring three centuries.

Harris was born at Christchurch in 1964 and educated at Waitaki Boys' High School. His father, Zin Harris, played Test cricket for New Zealand, as did his brother, Chris Harris. After playing Second XI matches for Canterbury during the 1987–88 season, Harris made his representative debut the following season. He made three first-class appearances for the team before moving to play for Otago the following season.

After two seasons in Otago, in which he played 18 first-class matches and scored over 800 runs, including his highest first-class score of 141 not out, Harris moved back to Canterbury in 1991–92. He played until the end of the 1994–95 season, after which he began a radio broadcasting career at More FM. He has since worked as a manager for the station and as an auctioneer for Baileys Real Estate in Christchurch. He has also acted as a selector for the Canterbury team.
