= Mohan Meakins Cricket Stadium =

Cricket ground

- Interactive map of Mohan Meakins Cricket Stadium

Ground information
- Location: Ghaziabad, Uttar Pradesh
- Country: India
- Coordinates: 28.67703°N 77.38434°E
- Establishment: 1971
- Capacity: 200
- Owner: Government of Uttar Pradesh
- Operator: Government of Uttar Pradesh

International information
- First women's ODI: 11 December 1997: Netherlands v New Zealand
- Last women's ODI: 15 December 1997: India v Netherlands

Mohan Meakins Cricket Stadium or Narendra Mohan Sports Stadium is a cricket ground in Ghaziabad, India. The stadium has hosted 12 Ranji Trophy matches from 1977 when home team Uttar Pradesh cricket team and Baroda cricket team played other. The ground was also host 1977/78 Ranji Trophy finals featuring Uttar Pradesh cricket team and Karnataka cricket team.

The stadium one of 25 venue for 1997 Women's Cricket World Cup and hosted two matches between Netherlands Women's and New Zealand Women's and again between India Women's and Netherlands Women's.
