= Harbax Singh Stadium =

Sports stadium in New Delhi, India

Harbaksh Stadium
- Interactive map of Harbaksh Stadium

Ground information
- Location: Polo Road, Delhi Cantonment, New Delhi, 110010
- Country: India
- Coordinates: 28°59′13″N 77°13′35″E
- Owner: Delhi & District Cricket Association
- Operator: Delhi & District Cricket Association

International information
- First WODI: 20 December 1997: Denmark v West Indies
- Last WODI: 24 December 1997: India v Australia
- As of 9 December 2019; Source: ESPNcricinfo

Harbaksh Stadium is a sports stadium in Delhi Cantonment, New Delhi, Delhi, India, which hosts cricket matches, including part of the 1997 Women's Cricket World Cup.

== See also ==
- Delhi
- List of Test cricket grounds
- List of stadiums in India
- Sport in India
