= Purnima Choudhary =

Indian cricketer (born 1971)

Personal information
- Born: 15 October 1971 (age 55); Calcutta, India
- Batting: Right-handed
- Bowling: Right-arm medium fast

International information
- National side: India
- ODI debut (cap 53): 13 December 1997 v West Indies
- Last ODI: 24 December 1997 v Australia

Career statistics
Competition	WODI
Matches	5
Runs scored	20
Batting average	20.00
100s/50s	0/0
Top score	11*
Balls bowled	150
Wickets	6
Bowling average	10.66
5 wickets in innings	5
10 wickets in match	0
Best bowling	5/21
Catches/stumpings	0/–
- Source: CricketArchive, 8 May 2020

Purnima Choudhary (born 15 October 1971) is a former One Day International cricketer who represented India. She played as a right-hand batsman and bowled right-arm medium pace. She played five ODIs for India and scored 20 runs, and took six wickets including a five-wicket haul on debut.
