= Nehru Stadium, Gurgaon =

Cricket stadium in eastern India

Jawaharlal Nehru Stadium
- Nehru Stadium

Ground information
- Location: Gurgaon, Haryana, India
- Country: India
- Establishment: 1987
- Capacity: 25,000
- Owner: Gurgaon Municipal Corporation
- Operator: Gurgaon Municipal Corporation
- Tenants: n/a
- End names
- n/a

International information
- Only WODI: 18 December 1997: Ireland v Pakistan
- As of 9 December 2019; Source: Nehru Stadium, ESPNcricinfo

Nehru Stadium or Dronacharya Stadium is a cricket stadium in Gurgaon, India. Nehru Stadium which is designed for football and athletics. The stadium is home ground for Haryana cricket team. Presently it is named after first Prime Minister of India Jawaharlal Nehru. Stadium has hosted an international match between Ireland women's cricket team and Pakistan women's national cricket team in 1997 Women's Cricket World Cup where Ireland women's cricket team won by 182 runs.

== Women's One Day International cricket ==
The stadium has hosted following Women's ODI matches till date.

Team (A)	Team (B)	Winner	Margin	Year
Ireland	Pakistan	Ireland	By 132 runs	1997

== See also ==
- Dominence of Haryana in sports
