= Chris Harris (cricketer) =

New Zealand cricketer

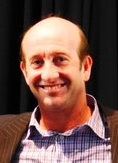

Personal information
- Full name: Chris Zinzan Harris
- Born: 20 November 1969 (age 56); Christchurch, Canterbury
- Batting: Left-handed
- Bowling: Right-arm slow
- Role: All-rounder
- Relatives: Zin Harris (father); Ben Harris (brother)

International information
- National side: New Zealand (1990–2004)
- Test debut (cap 181): 27 November 1992 v Sri Lanka
- Last Test: 28 June 2002 v West Indies
- ODI debut (cap 72): 29 November 1990 v Australia
- Last ODI: 8 December 2004 v Australia
- ODI shirt no.: 5

Domestic team information
- Years: Team
- 1989/90–2009/10: Canterbury
- 2003: Gloucestershire
- 2003: Derbyshire

Career statistics
Competition	Test	ODI	FC	LA
Matches	23	250	131	449
Runs scored	777	4,379	7,377	9,584
Batting average	20.44	29.00	45.53	34.35
100s/50s	0/5	1/16	15/41	3/47
Top score	71	130	251*	130
Balls bowled	2,560	10,667	14,887	20,244
Wickets	15	203	160	396
Bowling average	73.12	37.50	35.75	34.09
5 wickets in innings	0	1	0	1
10 wickets in match	0	0	0	0
Best bowling	2/16	5/42	4/22	5/42
Catches/stumpings	14/–	96/–	120/0	197/–
Medal record
Men's cricket
Representing New Zealand
ICC Champions Trophy
Winner	2000 Kenya
Commonwealth Games
Third place	1998 Kuala Lumpur
- Source: ESPNcricinfo, 1 May 2017

Chris Zinzan Harris (born 20 November 1969) is a former New Zealand cricketer who became, over the course of the 1990s, a folk-hero in New Zealand cricket. Harris was a member of the New Zealand team that won the 2000 ICC KnockOut Trophy.

A left-handed middle-order batsman and deliverer of right-arm slow-medium deliveries, Harris rescued the New Zealand team's batting on numerous occasions and his deceptive looping bowling often restricted the run rates of opposition batting line-ups.

== Personal life ==
Harris's father Zin Harris was also a New Zealand international player, and his brother Ben Harris has played at first-class level. All three of these players share the family traditional name of "Zinzan", also shared by a distant relation, former All Black Zinzan Brooke.

== Domestic career ==
In first-class cricket Harris has played 128 matches and scored over 7000 runs at an average of over 45, including 13 centuries with a highest score of 251*. He has taken over 120 wickets at an average of 38, with best figures of 4/22. However, his test career was limited to just 23 Tests, where his average with the bat was only around 20, and he took only 16 wickets at 73 runs apiece.

In 2007 Harris played for Bacup in the Lancashire League and finished the season as the League's highest wicket-taker with 82 at 13.08. Harris was the captain of the Indian Cricket League's Hyderabad Heroes.

Harris is also a sensation at the indoor version of the game and represented Canterbury and New Zealand at will and is also involved in the coaching of Canterbury youth indoor cricket teams.

During the 2012–13 season, Harris played club cricket as a player/coach for Papatoetoe Cricket Club, Auckland, New Zealand.

Since the 2013–14 season, Harris has joined the Sydenham Cricket Club, Christchurch, New Zealand and was selected as the club's Player of the Year. Harris became the Premier teams Player/Coach at the start of the 2014–15 season. In the 2015/16 season, Harris led the Sydenham Premier team to win their first 2 Day Championship title in 30 years, culminating in winning the Canterbury Metropolitan Cricket Association's "Men’s Club Cricket Player of the Year" award.

Harris stepped down as Sydenham Player/Coach at the start of the 2019–20 season, being replaced by another former Black Cap Matthew Bell. Harris still played for the Premier team in the 1-Day competition.

== After cricket ==
Chris Harris presenting a pitch report for Sky Sport before a Super Smash game at the Basin Reserve.

Harris become one of many high-profile international cricketers to move to Zimbabwe to be involved in the country's cricket, and was in charge of the national U-19 side. He also was a cricket commentator for Sky Sport and since 2023 has been part of SENZ cricket commentary team. Since 2024, he is a second umpire for the annual Team Cricket vs. Team Rugby Black Clash.
