= Surya Prakash Rao =

Indian cricket umpire (born 1948)

Personal information
- Born: 3 October 1948 (age 78); Machilipatnam, India

Umpiring information
- ODIs umpired: 1 (1996)
- WODIs umpired: 2 (1997)
- Source: Cricinfo, 27 May 2014

B Surya Prakash Rao (born 3 October 1948) is a former Indian cricket umpire. In his international umpiring career, he has only officiated in a single ODI game, in 1996.

== See also ==
- List of One Day International cricket umpires
