= Des Raj =

Indian cricket umpire (1944–2013)

Personal information
- Born: 1 January 1944; Shakargarh, Pakistan
- Died: 4 August 2013 (aged 69)

Umpiring information
- ODIs umpired: 1 (1998)
- WTests umpired: 1 (2005)
- WODIs umpired: 3 (1995–1997)
- Source: ESPNcricinfo, 27 May 2014

Des Raj (1 January 1944 – 4 August 2013) was an Indian cricket umpire. He only stood in one international fixture, a One Day International in 1998.

== See also ==
- List of One Day International cricket umpires
