= Malene Brock =

Danish cricketer

Personal information
- Full name: Malene Brock

International information
- National side: Denmark
- ODI debut (cap 28): 5 July 1997 v Netherlands
- Last ODI: 26 July 1998 v Netherlands

Career statistics
Competition	WODI
Matches	8
Runs scored	27
Batting average	6.75
100s/50s	0/0
Top score	8*
Balls bowled	390
Wickets	4
Bowling average	65.25
5 wickets in innings	0
10 wickets in match	0
Best bowling	2/38
Catches/stumpings	1/0
- Source: ESPNcricinfo, 28 September 2020

Malene Brock is a Danish former cricketer. She played eight Women's One Day International matches for Denmark women's national cricket team between 1997 and 1998. Brock made her One Day International debut against the Netherlands on 5 July 1997.
