= O. Krishna =

Indian cricket umpire

Personal information
- Full name: O. Krishna

Umpiring information
- ODIs umpired: 1 (1998)
- WODIs umpired: 2 (1997–2003)
- Source: ESPNcricinfo, 25 May 2014

O. Krishna is a former Indian cricket umpire. At the international level, he stood in a single One Day International in 1998.

== See also ==
- List of One Day International cricket umpires
