= Vijay Chopra =

Indian cricketer and umpire (born 1948)

Personal information
- Born: 5 July 1948 (age 78); Delhi, India

Umpiring information
- ODIs umpired: 6 (1996–2002)
- WODIs umpired: 1 (1997)
- Source: Cricinfo, 17 May 2014

Vijay Chopra (born 5 July 1948) is a former Indian cricketer and umpire. He played in 65 first-class matches from 1974 to 1984. He later umpired in numerous first class matches. He also officiated in six One Day International (ODI) matches from 1996 to 2002.

== See also ==
- List of One Day International cricket umpires
