= Satish Gupta =

Indian cricket umpire (born 1951)

Personal information
- Born: 5 September 1951 (age 75)

Umpiring information
- ODIs umpired: 5 (1999–2002)
- WODIs umpired: 4 (1997–2005)
- Source: Cricinfo, 18 May 2014

Satish Chandra Gupta (born 5 September 1951) is an Indian former cricket umpire. Having mainly umpired at the first-class level, Gupta stood in five One Day Internationalmatches between 1999 and 2002.

== See also ==
- List of One Day International cricket umpires
