= List of Jersey women Twenty20 International cricketers =

This is a list of Jersey women Twenty20 International cricketers. A Twenty20 International is an international cricket match between two representative teams, each having Twenty20 International status, as determined by the International Cricket Council (ICC). A Twenty20 International is played under the rules of Twenty20 cricket.

This list includes all players who have played at least one T20I match and is initially arranged in the order of debut appearance. Where more than one player won their first cap in the same match, those players are initially listed alphabetically at the time of debut.

== Key ==
General

- ‡ – Captain
- † – Wicket-keeper
- First – Year of debut
- Last – Year of latest game
- Mat – Number of matches played

Batting

- Runs – Runs scored in career
- HS – Highest score
- Avg – Runs scored per dismissal
- * – Batsman remained not out
- 50 – Number of half centuries

Bowling

- Wkt – Wickets taken in career
- BBI – Best bowling in an innings
- Ave – Average runs per wicket

Fielding

- Ca – Catches taken
- St – Stumpings affected

== List of players ==
Statistics are correct as of 29 July 2026.

Jersey women T20I cricketers
General					Batting				Bowling				Fielding		Ref
No.	Name	First	Last	Mat	Runs	HS	Avg	50	Balls	Wkt	BBI	Ave	Ca	St	Ref
1	Florrie Copley	2019	2024	11	39	39*	39.00	0	207	12	3/12	11.75	1	0	
2	Tea Brocklesby	2019	2022	2	–	–	–	–	–	–	–	–	0	0	
3	Erin Gouge	2019	2026	33	88	19*	9.77	0	466	18	3/6	22.16	11	0	
4	Chloe Greechan‡	2019	2026	51	293	28*	14.65	0	1107	64	5/4	10.07	13	0	
5	Lily Greig	2019	2026	28	284	36	15.77	0	78	2	2/19	36.50	5	0	
6	Rosa Hill‡	2019	2023	10	13	7*	–	0	180	12	4/16	11.91	1	0	
7	Mia Maguire†	2019	2026	49	209	44*	13.93	0	–	–	–	–	15	13	
8	Georgia Mallet†	2019	2025	28	88	23	17.60	0	352	23	4/5	14.86	8	1	
9	Analise Merritt‡	2019	2026	48	964	77	24.71	7	845	35	4/22	23.62	15	0	
10	Florence Tanguy	2019	2026	33	157	26	8.26	0	678	40	3/11	14.80	10	0	
11	Grace Wetherall	2019	2026	50	766	85*	27.35	5	589	29	4/17	20.13	8	0	
12	Nia Greig	2019	2025	14	1	1	0.33	0	–	–	–	–	3	0	
13	Maria Da Rocha	2019	2026	26	211	46	11.72	0	120	4	2/25	26.25	4	0	
14	Rose Heaney	2019	2019	2	0	0*	–	0	24	0	–	–	0	0	
15	Taci Alker	2019	2019	3	–	–	–	–	–	–	–	–	0	0	
16	Erin Duffy	2022	2026	21	45	23*	22.50	0	393	18	2/15	20.22	1	0	
17	Charlie Miles	2022	2024	18	330	68	25.38	2	12	0	–	–	7	0	
18	Trinity Smith	2022	2026	43	510	59*	21.25	2	132	7	2/18	19.85	13	0	
19	Olive Smith	2022	2022	1	–	–	–	–	18	1	1/19	19.00	0	0	
20	Aimee Aikenhead	2023	2026	38	744	85	27.55	6	12	0	–	–	3	0	
21	Sophia Hanson	2023	2024	4	7	4	3.50	0	75	5	3/7	11.20	2	0	
22	Rosemary Bowley	2023	2024	6	12	5	2.40	0	–	–	–	–	1	0	
23	Olivia Bastin	2024	2026	21	3	3*	1.50	0	282	14	3/2	21.07	9	0	
24	Hannah Rigby	2025	2025	3	2	2*	–	0	–	–	–	–	0	0	
25	Tallulah Spry	2025	2025	8	0	0	0.00	0	–	–	–	–	0	0	
26	Annabel Mossop	2025	2026	13	139	43*	34.75	0	42	2	1/14	36.50	2	0	
27	Kate Follain	2025	2026	3	1	1*	1.00	0	–	–	–	–	0	0	
28	Daisy Pearce	2025	2026	2	–	–	–	–	12	0	–	–	0	0	
29	Daisy Fisher	2026	2026	2	–	–	–	–	24	1	1/10	17.00	0	0	
30	Jemma Wery	2026	2026	1	–	–	–	–	–	–	–	–	0	0	

== Details ==
The following are details on players that do not have articles on Wikipedia. For players with articles on Wikipedia, see links in the table above.

=== Florrie Copley ===
Florrie Copley is a retired cricketer who played for the Jersey women's cricket team. She was one of only two players to feature in both the first inter-insular women's cricket match between Jersey and Guernsey and Jersey's inaugural WT20I.

Copley played in the first inter-insular women's cricket match between Jersey and Guernsey in September 2009.

Almost a decade later she was on the field as the two teams met in both countries' first officially recognised WT20I which was contested for the 2019 T20 Inter-Insular Cup at College Field, Saint Peter Port, on 31 May 2019. Batting at number three, Copley top-scored for her side with 39 runs off 45 balls including six boundaries as well as recording bowling figures of 0/15 from her four overs.

It was three years until her next WT20I outing, when she was among the Jersey squad which took part in the 2022 France Women's T20I Quadrangular Series.

Copley made her first home WT20I appearances in the newly expanded three-match 2022 Women's Inter-Insular Cup against Guernsey at Grainville Cricket Ground. She took 2/10 in the first game and then claimed two wickets in the space of four balls to finish with identical figures in the third contest, although the latter was not an official WT20I.

She played in two of Jersey's five matches at the 2023 ICC Women's T20 World Cup Europe Qualifier, taking 2/13 in the win over Turkey and 2/1 from 1.3 overs in a 108-run victory against Sweden.

Later that year, Copley took a to-date career-best three wickets for 12 runs in the opening match of the 2023 WT20I Inter-Insular Cup against Guernsey at King George V Sports Ground in Castel.

Having announced her intention to retire after the match, Copley made her final appearance for Jersey against Guernsey in the 2024 Inter-insular Cup at Grainville Cricket Ground in St Saviour, taking 3/15 as the islanders' retained the trophy for a third successive year with a 104 run win.

=== Erin Gouge ===
Erin Gouge (born 23 October 2006) is a cricketer who plays for the Jersey women's cricket team.

Aged 12, Gouge played in Jersey's first officially recognised WT20I against neighbours Guernsey for the 2019 T20 Inter-Insular Cup at College Field, Saint Peter Port, on 31 May 2019. She did not bat but bowled one over which went for 11 runs.

Later that year she was in the Jersey team that finished second at the France Women's T20I Quadrangular Series.

Gouge was among the Jersey squad which went one better and lifted the trophy at the 2022 France Women's T20I Quadrangular Series, taking two wickets and bowling with a miserly economy rate of 4.16 across the tournament.

She made her first home international appearances in the newly expanded three-match 2022 Women's Inter-Insular Cup against Guernsey at Grainville Cricket Ground.

Gouge was part of the Jersey squad which finished third at the 2023 ICC Women's T20 World Cup Europe Qualifier, with her personal tournament highlight being taking three wickets for six runs in a player of the match winning performance against Turkey.

=== Lily Greig ===
Lily Greig (born 12 January 2005) is a cricketer who plays for the Jersey women's cricket team.

Aged 14, Greig played in Jersey's first officially recognised WT20I against neighbours Guernsey for the 2019 T20 Inter-Insular Cup at College Field, Saint Peter Port, on 31 May 2019. Batting at number five, she scored four runs off 16 balls.

Later that year she was in the Jersey team that finished runners-up at the France Women's T20I Quadrangular Series. Greig was the side's top run-scorer and the second highest overall among the four teams at the event. Playing alongside her was her younger sister, Nia, whose appearance aged 11 years and 40 days, made her the youngest person to play international cricket.

Greig was among the Jersey squad which went one better and lifted the trophy at the 2022 France Women's T20I Quadrangular Series.

She made her first home international appearances in the newly expanded three-match 2022 Women's Inter-Insular Cup against Guernsey at Grainville Cricket Ground. Greig top scored for Jersey in both the first and second matches with 29 not out and 23 respectively as the islanders swept the series.

Greig was part of the Jersey contingent which contested the 2023 ICC Women's T20 World Cup Europe Qualifier.

Later that year, she made 26 not out as Jersey successfully chased 85 in just 12 overs to defeat Guernsey in the second match of the 2023 WT20I Inter-Insular Cup and clinch the trophy with a game to spare.

=== Mia Maguire ===
Mia Maguire (born 16 January 2007) is a cricketer who plays as a wicket-keeper for the Jersey women's cricket team.

Aged 12, Maguire played in Jersey's first officially recognised WT20I against neighbours Guernsey for the 2019 T20 Inter-Insular Cup at College Field, Saint Peter Port, on 31 May 2019, although she neither batted nor kept wicket.

Later that year she was in the Jersey team that finished second at the France Women's T20I Quadrangular Series.

Maguire was among the Jersey squad which went one better and lifted the trophy at the 2022 France Women's T20I Quadrangular Series with her personal tournament highlight being a score of 44 off 48 balls in an unbeaten 119-run fifth wicket partnership with Trinity Smith against Spain.

She made her first home international appearances in the newly expanded three-match 2022 Women's T20I Inter-Insular Series against Guernsey at Grainville Cricket Ground.

Maguire was part of the Jersey squad which finished third at the 2023 ICC Women's T20 World Cup Europe Qualifier.

During the 2023 WT20I Inter-Insular Cup, Maguire was joint top scorer in the first match, making 26 not out, as Jersey went on to sweep Guernsey 3–0 in the series.

=== Georgia Mallet ===
Georgia Mallet (Note: Mallet is spelled Mallett in some sources but the official Jersey Cricket website, ESPNcricinfo and the Jersey Evening Post all spell the name as Mallet.) (born 12 January 2005) is a cricketer who plays for the Jersey women's cricket team.

Aged 14, Mallet played as wicket-keeper in Jersey's first officially recognised WT20I against neighbours Guernsey for the 2019 T20 Inter-Insular Cup at College Field, Saint Peter Port, on 31 May 2019. She also opened the batting, scoring 23 off 14 balls including hitting five 4s.

Later that year, and having relinquished the wicket-keeping gloves, she was in the Jersey team that finished second at the France Women's T20I Quadrangular Series.

Now operating as a seam-bowler, Mallet was among the Jersey squad which went one better and lifted the trophy at the 2022 France Women's T20I Quadrangular Series taking three wickets for 15 runs against Austria.

She made her first home international appearance in the final match of the newly-expanded three-game 2022 Women's Inter-Insular Cup against Guernsey at Grainville Cricket Ground, taking one wicket for the cost of just four runs in her two overs, although the contest was not an official WT20I.

Mallet was part of the Jersey squad which finished third at the 2023 ICC Women's T20 World Cup Europe Qualifier with her personal tournament highlight being figures of 4/5 off three overs in the islanders' opening match against Italy. Two of her overs were maidens and the performance earned her player of the match honours.

=== Analise Merritt ===
Analise Merritt (born 13 August 2006) is a cricketer who plays for the Jersey women's cricket team.

Aged 12, Merritt played in Jersey's first officially recognised WT20I against neighbours Guernsey for the 2019 T20 Inter-Insular Cup at College Field, Saint Peter Port on 31 May 2019. Opening the batting, she faced the islanders' first WT20I delivery and went on to score 17 off 28 balls, as well as bowling 2.5 overs recording figures of 0/33.

Later that year she won the best young player award as Jersey finished second at the France Women's T20I Quadrangular Series.

Merritt was part of the squad which represented Jersey in the 2023 ICC Women's T20 World Cup Europe Qualifier. Her personal tournament highlight was smashing six boundaries on the way to making 45 not out off 35 balls against Germany in an unbroken partnership of 101 with Grace Wetherall, which was a new WT20I record for a seventh wicket stand.

She made her first WT20I half-century against Guernsey in the third match of the 2023 WT20I Inter-Insular Cup, hitting nine boundaries in a score of 58 as Jersey sealed a 3–0 series victory.

=== Florence Tanguy ===
Florence Tanguy (born 4 May 2006) is a cricketer who plays for the Jersey women's cricket team.

Less than four weeks after her 13th birthday, Tanguy played in Jersey's first officially recognised WT20I against neighbours Guernsey for the 2019 T20 Inter-Insular Cup at College Field, Saint Peter Port, on 31 May 2019. Batting at number four, she scored three runs off 10 balls before recording team-best bowling figures of 1/19 from her three overs.

Later that year she was in the Jersey team that finished runners-up at the France Women's T20I Quadrangular Series. During the tournament, Tanguy contributed with both bat and ball, most notably taking 2/22 and then scoring 26 as the islanders won their second match with France and recording figures of 2/13 in a nine-wicket victory over Austria.

After a gap of almost four years, Tanguy returned to the Jersey set-up for the 2023 WT20I Inter-Insular Cup. She was not included in the side for the opening contest but took 1/12 in the second match before bagging 2/7 and scoring six not out in the final game as the islanders swept the series 3–0.

=== Maria Da Rocha ===
Maria Da Rocha (born 12 January 2000) is a cricketer who plays for the Jersey women's cricket team.

Da Rocha was part of the Jersey squad for the 2019 France Women's T20I Quadrangular Series, featuring in all the team's six matches as they finished runners-up behind the hosts.

She was among the Jersey squad which went one better and lifted the trophy at the 2022 France Women's T20I Quadrangular Series, scoring 20 off 22 balls in the islanders' win over France in their opening game and then hitting 46 from 45 balls in their victory against Austria.

Da Rocha made her first home WT20I appearance in the newly expanded 2022 Women's Inter-Insular Cup against Guernsey at Grainville Cricket Ground, scoring 23 not out in an unbroken 69-run partnership with Lily Greig as Jersey successfully chased 71 to win the first of the three-match series by nine wickets.

She was a member of the Jersey squad that contested the 2023 ICC Women's T20 World Cup Europe Qualifier.

Later that year Da Rocha made 26 as Jersey successfully chased a target of 85 in just 12 overs to defeat Guernsey in the second match of the 2023 WT20I Inter-Insular Cup and clinch the trophy with a game to spare.

=== Erin Duffy ===
Erin Duffy (born 20 June 2007) is a cricketer who plays for the Jersey women's cricket team.

Duffy got her first call-up to the Jersey WT20I squad for the 2022 France Women's T20I Quadrangular Series.

She made her debut in the event's opening contest against the hosts taking one wicket for 16 runs from her four overs.

Duffy was then the pick of the Jersey bowlers in the tournament final when the French were again the opposition, registering figures of 1/22 as the islanders' won by six wickets to claim the trophy. She finished the event at the top of the overall bowling economy rate standings with an average of 4.09 runs coming off each of her overs throughout the competition.

Later that season she made her first home international appearance in the 2022 Women's Inter-Insular Cup against Guernsey at Grainville Cricket Ground.

Duffy was part of the Jersey squad which finished third at the 2023 ICC Women's T20 World Cup Europe Qualifier with her personal tournament highlight being taking two wickets for 15 runs against Turkey.

Having taken 2/31 in the first match of a bilateral series against the Netherlands at Sportpark Maarschalkerweerd in Utrecht on 24 August 2023, Duffy went on to make her highest international score with the bat in the second contest later the same day, compiling 23 not out off 27 balls.

=== Aimee Aikenhead ===
Aimee Aikenhead (born 22 June 2006) is a cricketer who plays for the Jersey women's cricket team.

Aikenhead was a member of the Jersey squad that came third at the 2023 ICC Women's T20 World Cup Europe Qualifier, narrowly missing out on qualification for the next stage. Having been dismissed without scoring against France, she scored her first international runs in the islanders' final match against Sweden, making 13 as the team ended the tournament on a high with a 108-run win.

She compiled her first WT20I half-century against Guernsey in the third match of the 2023 Inter-Insular Cup at King George V Sports Ground in Castel. Opening the batting, Aikenhead hit seven boundaries in a score of 57 not out off 53 balls as Jersey sealed a 3–0 series victory.

Aikenhead was in the Jersey squad for a bilateral series against the Netherlands at Sportpark Maarschalkerweerd in Utrecht in August 2023. She opened the batting for the islanders in both completed matches scoring a total of 12 runs as the team struggled against higher-ranked opposition.

She was one of four players shortlisted for the 2023 Jersey Cricket Women's Cricketer of the Year.
