= Trinity Smith =

Jersey cricketer (born 2004)

Personal information
- Born: 2 August 2004 (age 22)
- Batting: Right-handed
- Bowling: Right-arm Medium fast
- Role: All-rounder

International information
- National side: Jersey (2022–present)
- T20I debut (cap 18): 5 May 2022 v France
- Last T20I: 29 July 2026 v Switzerland

Career statistics
Competition	WT20I
Matches	43
Runs scored	510
Batting average	21.25
100s/50s	–/2
Top score	59*
Balls bowled	132
Wickets	7
Bowling average	19.85
5 wickets in innings	0
10 wickets in match	0
Best bowling	2/18
Catches/stumpings	13/–
- Source: Cricinfo, 29 July 2026

Trinity Smith (born 2 August 2004) is a cricketer who plays for the Jersey women's cricket team. She is the first Jersey woman to score a half-century in a WT20I. Smith is also the first player from the island - male or female - to be nominated for an ICC Player of the Month Award.

== Career ==
Three years after first taking up cricket, Smith made her international debut at the 2022 France Women's T20I Quadrangular Series on 5 May 2022 in a match against the host nation during which she took a wicket. The following day she became the first Jersey woman to score a WT20I half-century when she hit 59 not out off 43 balls including eight fours as Jersey beat Spain with Smith named player of the match.

In the tournament final against the French she smashed a 40-ball 56 not out as Jersey successfully chased a target of 126 with 3.2 overs to spare, again earning herself player of the match honours.

At the start of June 2022, Smith was nominated for the ICC Women's Player of the Month Award. Shortlisted alongside the Pakistan duo of Tuba Hassan and Bismah Maroof, it was the first time any cricketer from Jersey - male or female - had been put up for an ICC monthly best player award.

Later that month she was named in the Jersey squad for the Women's T20I Inter-Insular Cup at home against neighbours Guernsey.

Smith was among the Jersey contingent which finished third at the 2023 ICC Women's T20 World Cup Europe Qualifier, with her personal highlight being a knock of 23 in a 108-run win against Sweden.

She got her first taste of captaining the national side when she led the squad on a tour of Northern Ireland which included two T20 matches against Ireland Women’s U19 Academy in June 2024.

The following month, Smith made 22 and shared a 79-run partnership with Charlie Miles as Jersey retained the 2024 WT20I Inter-insular Cup for the third successive year with a 104-run win over Guernsey at Grainville Cricket Ground in St Saviour.

In August 2024, Smith was among the British and Irish Roses squad selected to take on Team Europe in the inaugural Meltl Shield, a nine-match T10 competition, held at Roma Cricket Ground in Rome, Italy.

Smith was named in the Jersey squad for the T10 European Cricket Championship (ECC) in Spain and a two-match T20 series against Gibraltar in December 2024. At the ECC event, she top-scored for the islanders' in their group stage wins over Germany and Austria with knocks of 28 not out and 21 respectively.

She was part of the Jersey squad for the 2025 Women's T20 World Cup Europe Qualifier Division Two in Rome. Smith made 44 off 40 balls, including hitting five 4s, and shared in a sixth-wicket partnership of 74 in 9.4 overs with captain Chloe Greechan as the islanders defeated the Isle of Man in their fourth match.
