= Charlie Miles =

Jersey cricketer (born 2001)

Personal information
- Born: 14 August 2001 (age 25)
- Batting: Right-handed
- Bowling: Right-arm Medium fast
- Role: Batter

International information
- National side: Jersey (2022–2024)
- T20I debut (cap 17): 5 May 2022 v Guernsey
- Last T20I: 27 July 2024 v Italy

Career statistics
Competition	WT20I
Matches	18
Runs scored	330
Batting average	25.38
100s/50s	–/2
Top score	68
Balls bowled	12
Wickets	0
Bowling average	–
5 wickets in innings	0
10 wickets in match	0
Best bowling	–
Catches/stumpings	7/–
- Source: Cricinfo, 16 November 2024

Charlie Miles (born 14 August 2001) is a former cricketer who played for the Jersey women's national team.

== Career ==
Miles made her debut for Jersey at the 2022 France Women's T20I Quadrangular Series on 5 May 2022 in a player-of-the-match performance against the host nation, making an unbeaten 39 off 32 balls including five boundaries opening the batting as the islanders successfully chased 88 in 12.3 overs.

She compiled her first WT20I half-century with a score of 57 off 59 balls against Austria in Jersey's third match of the event as she again won player of the match in a 70-run victory.

In the tournament final against France she hit 33 off 39 balls, anchoring the innings as Jersey successfully chased 126 inside 17 overs to clinch the trophy.

Miles made her first home international appearances in the three-match 2022 Women's Inter-Insular Cup against neighbours Guernsey at Grainville Cricket Ground, scoring an unbeaten 78 in the third match, which was not an official WT20I.

She was part of the squad which represented the island in the 2023 ICC Women's T20 World Cup Europe Qualifier, making 22 not out off 21 balls in the opening match win against Italy and then top scoring with 23 in a nine-wicket success over Turkey.

Fresh off being a member of Jersey's touring party to Northern Ireland in June 2024 for fixtures against Ireland Women’s U19 Academy and NCU Knights, Miles top-scored with 68 off 42 balls, including nine boundaries, as the islanders retained the WT20I Inter-insular Cup for a third year in row, defeating Guernsey in a one-off match at Grainville Cricket Ground in St Saviour on 15 July by 104-runs.

In August 2024, Miles was among the British and Irish Roses squad selected to take on Team Europe in the inaugural Meltl Shield, a nine-match T10 competition, held at Roma Cricket Ground in Rome, Italy.

== Personal life ==
Miles attended Jersey College for Girls. In 2017 she was awarded an Arkwright Scholarship after impressing the judges at the University of Bath with her design for a buggy to mark the boundaries on cricket fields.
