= Nia Greig =

Jersey cricketer (born 2008)

Personal information
- Full name: Nia Charlotte Greig
- Born: 21 June 2008 (age 18)
- Batting: Right-handed
- Bowling: Right-arm medium

International information
- National side: Jersey (2019–present)
- T20I debut (cap 12): 31 July 2019 v France
- Last T20I: 29 May 2025 v Sweden

Career statistics
Competition	WT20I
Matches	14
Runs scored	1
Batting average	0.33
100s/50s	–/–
Top score	1
Catches/stumpings	3/–
- Source: Cricinfo, 29 May 2025

Nia Charlotte Greig (born 21 June 2008) is cricketer from Jersey. Having made her debut for the Jersey women's cricket team aged just 11 years and 40 days old, she holds the world record for being the youngest person to play international cricket.

== Career ==
Greig was among 13 players who represented Jersey at the 2019 France Women's T20I Quadrangular Series held in Nantes from 31 July to 3 August 2019, which also featured the host nation, Norway and Austria.

When she stepped on the field for the event's opening fixture against France she became the youngest player - male or female - to take part in an international cricket match aged 11 years and 40 days. Greig did not bat or bowl in the game although her 14-year-old sister, Lily, top scored with 36 as France won by seven wickets.

She went on to feature in four of Jersey's five other matches in the tournament, only being left out of their contest with Norway on day two, albeit she again neither batted or bowled in any of the games as the islanders finished second.

In November 2020, the sport's global governing body, the International Cricket Council, introduced a new rule that barred anyone aged under 15 from playing international cricket. While the ICC said countries can apply for special dispensation if they can prove "the player’s playing experience and mental development and wellbeing demonstrates that they would be capable of coping with the demands of international cricket," the change in regulations means Greig is likely to never see her record broken.

Having now passed the new age requirements, Greig was named in the Jersey squad for the 2025 Women's T20 World Cup Europe Qualifier Division Two in Rome.
