= Grace Wetherall =

Jersey cricketer (born 2006)

Personal information
- Born: 11 November 2006 (age 20)
- Batting: Right-handed
- Bowling: Right-arm Medium fast
- Role: All-rounder

International information
- National side: Jersey (2019–present)
- T20I debut (cap 11): 31 May 2019 v Guernsey
- Last T20I: 29 July 2026 v Switzerland

Career statistics
Competition	WT20I
Matches	50
Runs scored	766
Batting average	27.35
100s/50s	–/5
Top score	85*
Balls bowled	589
Wickets	29
Bowling average	20.13
5 wickets in innings	0
10 wickets in match	0
Best bowling	4/17
Catches/stumpings	8/–
- Source: Cricinfo, 29 July 2026

Grace Wetherall (born 11 November 2006) is a cricketer who plays for the Jersey women's cricket team. She is the first player to score a WT20I half-century batting at number eight. As of October 2026 she remains the only person to achieve this feat.

== Cricket career ==
Aged 12, Wetherall played in Jersey's first officially recognised WT20I against neighbours Guernsey for the 2019 T20 Inter-Insular Cup on 31 May 2019, although she neither batted nor bowled in the match at College Field, Saint Peter Port.

Later that year she was in the Jersey team that finished second at the France Women's T20I Quadrangular Series.

Wetherall was among the Jersey contingent which went one better and lifted the trophy at the 2022 France Women's T20I Quadrangular Series.

She was part of the squad which represented the island in the 2023 ICC Women's T20 World Cup Europe Qualifier. During the tournament Wetherall made her first WT20I half-century, scoring 57 not out against Germany in an unbroken partnership of 101 with Analise Merritt, which was a new world record for a seventh wicket stand in the format. Wetherall's innings came off 40 balls and featured nine 4s and a 6 and made her the first player batting at number eight to score a WT20I 50. She also took WT20I career-best bowling figures of 3/15 against France as Jersey finished third in the six-team event, narrowly missing out on progressing to the next stage of qualification.

At the three-match 2023 WT20I Inter-Insular Cup with Guernsey, Wetherall played a key role as Jersey swept to a 3–0 victory. She made 21 in first game, took 2/8 from three overs in the second and then scored 48 off just 30 balls in the third contest.

During Jersey's tour of Northern Ireland in June 2024, Wetherall registered bowling figures of 6/18 in the second of two T20 matches against Ireland Women’s U19 Academy.

In August 2024, Wetherall was among the British and Irish Roses squad selected to take on Team Europe in the inaugural Meltl Shield, a nine-match T10 competition, held at Roma Cricket Ground in Rome, Italy.

Wetherall was named in the Jersey squad for the T10 European Cricket Championship (ECC) in Spain and a two-match T20 series against Gibraltar in December 2024. At the ECC event, she scored 15 not out to steer the islanders to a seven-wicket win over Spain in the group stage. In the first match of the Gibraltar series, Wetherall took 2/9 off her four overs.

She was part of the Jersey squad for the 2025 Women's T20 World Cup Europe Qualifier Division Two in Rome. Wetherall recorded her career-best figures of 4/17 in the islanders' second match of the tournament against Germany.

Wetherall was named player of the match at the annual WT20I Inter-Insular Cup on 5 July 2025, after scoring 68 off 43 balls including three 6s and seven 4s as Jersey defeated Guernsey to retain the trophy at the King George V Sports Ground in Castel.

She spent the 2025/26 winter season playing grade cricket in Australia for North Sydney Bears. In February 2026, Wetherall was named the 2025 Jersey Women's Cricketer of the Year. The following month she was picked to be part of a European team to play against the Marylebone Cricket Club at Lord's on 17 April 2026.

Opening the batting, Wetherall scored 85 not out from 43 balls, including hitting one 6 and 14 4s, as Jersey defeated hosts Switzerland by seven wickets in the first match of the Switzerland Women's T20I Quadrangular Series in Embrach on 27 July 2026.

In August 2026, she was selected by the Vancouver Anchors for the Canada Super60, a 10-over per side franchise tournament to take place in September and October that year. During the first innings of her team's opening match against the Vancouver Warriors, Wetherall sustained a dislocated shoulder while diving in an attempt to prevent a boundary and was subsequently ruled out of the rest of the event.

== Hockey ==
Away from the cricket field, Wetherall has also represented Jersey in hockey including playing in the islanders' win over Guernsey in the 2024 inter-insular women's Big Stick match.
