= 2023 Women's T20I Inter-Insular Series =

International cricket tour

	Guernsey	Jersey
- Dates: 24 – 25 June 2023
Captains	Krista De La Mare	Chloe Greechan

Twenty20 International series
- Results: Jersey won the 3-match series 3–0
Most runs	Francesca Bulpitt (31); Rosie Davis (31)	Grace Wetherall (84)
Most wickets	Emily Merrien (5)	Chloe Greechan (4)

The 2023 Women's T20I Inter-Insular Series, consisting of three Twenty20 International (T20I) matches, took place in Guernsey in June 2022. The venue for the matches was the King George V Sports Ground in Castel. Jersey were the defending champions, having won the 2022 series in June 2022.

Jersey again won the series by a margin of 3–0, scoring their highest total in a T20I (196/3) and recording their biggest winning margin (157 runs) in the third match of the series.

== Squads ==
Guernsey	Jersey
Krista De La Mare (c, wk); Eva Bourgaize; Francesca Bulpitt (wk); Alice Davis; Rosie Davis; Hannah Mechem; Rebecca Hubbard; Claire Jennings; Emily Merrien; Elise Millington; Olivia Morgan; Molly Robinson; Philippa Stahelin; Elizabeth Wilcocks	Chloe Greechan (c); Aimee Aikenhead; Florrie Copley; Maria Da Rocha; Florence Tanguy; Erin Gouge; Lily Greig; Rosa Hill; Mia Maguire (wk); Georgia Mallet (wk); Analise Merritt; Trinity Smith; Grace Wetherall

== T20I series ==
=== 1st T20I ===
24 June 2023
11:00
Scorecard

Jersey; 139/6 (20 overs)	v	Guernsey; 78/9 (20 overs)
Mia Maguire 26* (37); Emily Merrien 3/24 (3 overs)		Krista De La Mare 23 (27); Florrie Copley 3/12 (4 overs)

Jersey won by 61 runs
King George V Sports Ground, Castel
Umpires: Stuart Hodgson (Jer) and Mike Kinder (Gue)
Player of the match: Chloe Greechan (Jer)

- Guernsey won the toss and elected to field.
- Alice Davis, Rosie Davis, Krista De La Mare and Elise Millington (Gue) all made their T20I debuts.

=== 2nd T20I ===
24 June 2023
15:00
Scorecard

Guernsey; 84/8 (20 overs)	v	Jersey; 85/2 (12 overs)
Rosie Davis 22 (45); Grace Wetherall 2/8 (3 overs)		Lily Greig 26* (40); Francesca Bulpitt 1/14 (3 overs)

Jersey won by 8 wickets
King George V Sports Ground, Castel
Umpires: Stuart Hodgson (Jer) and Mike Kinder (Gue)
Player of the match: Rosie Davis (Gue)

- Guernsey won the toss and elected to bat.

=== 3rd T20I ===
25 June 2023
12:30
Scorecard

Jersey; 196/3 (20 overs)	v	Guernsey; 38 (13 overs)
Analise Merritt 58 (32); Molly Robinson 1/17 (2 overs)		Rosie Davis 9 (10); Rosa Hill 2/4 (2 overs)

Jersey won by 158 runs
King George V Sports Ground, Castel
Umpires: Stuart Hodgson (Jer) and Chris Hurley (Gue)
Player of the match: Analise Merritt (Jer)

- Guernsey won the toss and elected to field.
- Eva Bourgaize (Gue) made her T20I debut.

== See also ==
- Inter-Insular cricket
