= Ines McKeon =

French cricketer

Personal information
- Full name: Ines Yvonne McKeon
- Born: 19 April 2007 (age 19); Australia
- Batting: Right-handed
- Bowling: Right-arm medium
- Role: Wicket-keeper
- Relatives: Gustav McKeon (brother)

International information
- National side: France (2023)
- T20I debut (cap 28): 5 May 2023 v Austria
- Last T20I: 12 September 2023 v Scotland

Domestic team information
- Years: Team
- 2023/24–present: Western Australia

Career statistics
Competition	WT20I	WLA	WT20
Matches	16	4	20
Runs scored	354	5	418
Batting average	23.60	5.00	–
100s/50s	0/2	0/0	0/2
Top score	94	5	94
Balls bowled	51	–	51
Wickets	2	–	2
Bowling average	30.00	–	30.00
5 wickets in innings	0	–	0
10 wickets in match	0	–	0
Best bowling	1/19	–	1/19
Catches/stumpings	0/–	2/–	1/–
- Source: CricketArchive, 4 February 2024

Ines Yvonne McKeon (born 19 April 2007) is a French-Australian cricketer. She plays for Western Australia and the Melbourne Stars in Australian domestic cricket and has represented the France women's national cricket team in international cricket. She plays primarily as a right-handed batter and wicket-keeper.

== Domestic career ==
In January 2024, McKeon was added to the Western Australia squad for their upcoming Women's National Cricket League matches. She made her debut for the side on 5 January 2024, against Australian Capital Territory.

In October 2024, McKeon signed a two-year contract with Melbourne Stars in the Women's Big Bash League (WBBL).

== International career ==
McKeon was born in Australia but qualifies for France through family connections, as with her brother Gustav McKeon. She made her Twenty20 International debut for the France women's national cricket team in May 2023, during their series against Austria. She scored her maiden half-century later that month, with 94 from 65 deliveries against Sweden in the 2023 ICC Women's T20 World Cup Europe Division 2 Qualifier. She went on to score another half-century against Scotland at the Division 1 Qualifier in September 2023, with 56 from 40 deliveries.
