= Chloe Greechan =

Jersey cricketer and bowls player (born 2000)

Personal information
- Full name: Chloe May Greechan
- Born: 22 September 2000 (age 26)
- Batting: Right-handed
- Bowling: Left-arm medium
- Role: All-rounder

International information
- National side: Jersey (2019–present)
- T20I debut (cap 4): 31 May 2019 v Guernsey
- Last T20I: 29 July 2026 v Switzerland

Career statistics
| Competition | WT20I |
|---|---|
| Matches | 51 |
| Runs scored | 293 |
| Batting average | 14.65 |
| 100s/50s | 0/0 |
| Top score | 28* |
| Balls bowled | 1,107 |
| Wickets | 64 |
| Bowling average | 10.07 |
| 5 wickets in innings | 1 |
| 10 wickets in match | 0 |
| Best bowling | 5/4 |
| Catches/stumpings | 13/– |
- Source: Cricinfo, 29 July 2026

Chloe Greechan
Sport
- Sport: Bowls
Medal record
Representing Jersey
Indoor bowls
IIBC Championships
| Gold medal – first place | 2015 | Mixed Pairs |
| Gold medal – first place | 2016 | Mixed Pairs |
European Championships
| Bronze medal – third place | 2024 Ayr | Women's Pairs |

Chloe May Greechan (born 22 September 2000) is an international cricketer and lawn and indoor bowler from Jersey. She plays for the Jersey women's cricket team, for which she has been captain since 2020, and is the first player from the island to take a five-wicket haul in Women's T20I. Greechan is also a two-time world champion in indoor bowls.

== Cricket career ==
Having represented Jersey since she was 13-years-old, Greechan played in the island's first officially recognised WT20I against neighbours Guernsey for the 2019 T20 Inter-Insular Cup on 31 May 2019. Batting at number six, she scored 4 not out in her side's innings before taking the new ball and sending down Jersey's first-ever WT20I delivery, going on to take one wicket for 20 runs in her four overs.

Later that year she won the best fielder award as Jersey finished second at the France Women's T20I Quadrangular Series.

Appointed captain of the national team in 2020, Greechan won the Jersey Cricket Women's Cricketer of the Year award in 2021 and again in 2022, the latter coming after she led the islanders to victory at the 2022 France Women's T20I Quadrangular Series and a 3–0 sweep in the newly expanded Women's Inter-Insular Cup.

At the 2023 ICC Women's T20 World Cup Europe Qualifier division two tournament, Greechan finished as the competition's leading wicket-taker with 11 dismissals to her name. That total included figures of 5/4 in a 108-run win against Sweden with three of her four overs being maidens. This made Greechan the first Jersey player to take a five-wicket haul in WT20Is.

Greechan had a trial at English professional club Sunrisers in 2023.

During the 2024 WT20I Inter-insular Cup, which had reverted to a one-off match, Greechan conceded just two runs from her three overs and scored 14 not out as Jersey defeated Guernsey by 104 runs to retain the title for the third successive year at Grainville Cricket Ground in St Saviour.

In August 2024, Greechan was among the British and Irish Roses squad selected to take on Team Europe in the inaugural Meltl Shield, a nine-match T10 competition, held at Roma Cricket Ground in Rome, Italy.

Greechan was named captain of the Jersey squad for the T10 European Cricket Championship (ECC) in Spain and a two-match T20 series against Gibraltar in December 2024. At the ECC event, which the islanders won, she took 2/2 in the group match victory over the Czech Republic. In the first contest of the Gibraltar series, Greechan took 2/2 off her four overs, two of which were maidens, and was named player of the match.

In April 2025, Greechan captained Jersey to victory at the Cyprus WT20I Quadrangular Series, winning all six of their matches against the hosts, Denmark and the Isle of Man. Individually she took 10 wickets across the tournament.

The following month she was named as captain of the Jersey squad for the 2025 Women's T20 World Cup Europe Qualifier Division Two in Rome. Greechan made 28 not out and shared in a sixth-wicket partnership of 74 in 9.4 overs with Trinity Smith as the islanders defeated the Isle of Man in their fourth match. She took 4/13, with all four wickets coming in her final over including a hat-trick, against Sweden in her team's last match of the tournament.

Greechan took two wickets for six runs from three overs as Jersey won the annual WT20I Inter-Insular Cup against Guernsey at the King George V Sports Ground in Castel on 5 July 2025.

== Bowls career ==
In April 2015, aged just 14, Greechan won the IIBC Championships Mixed Pairs world title with her father, Thomas. She retained the crown a year later alongside Malcolm De Sousa.

Greechan won the 2023 Channel Islands Indoor Bowls Championship women's pairs title with Megan Kivlin, defeating Guernsey duo Alison Merrien and Shirley Petit in the final.

In May 2024, she was selected to represent Jersey at the 2024 European Bowls Championships, held in September in Ayr, Scotland. At the competition in September that year, she won a bronze medal in the pairs with her mother Lindsey, winning four of their five group matches before losing in the semi-finals to England and defeating hosts Scotland in the third-place playoff.

== See also ==
- The Greechans
