= 2023 T20I Inter-Insular Series =

The 2023 T20I Inter-Insular Series can refer to:

- 2023 Women's T20I Inter-Insular Series, a bilateral cricket series held in June 2023 between the women's national teams of Guernsey and Jersey
- 2023 Men's T20I Inter-Insular Series, a bilateral cricket series held in July 2023 between the men's national teams of Guernsey and Jersey
