= 2022 France Women's T20I Quadrangular Series =

International cricket tournament

- Dates: 5 – 8 May 2022
- Cricket format: Twenty20 International
- Tournament format: Round-robin
- Host: France
- Champions: Jersey
- Runners-up: France
- Participants: 4
- Matches: 8
- Player of the series: (Austria) Mahadewa Pathirannehelage
- Most runs: (Spain) Elspeth Fowler (141)
- Most wickets: (Austria) Mahadewa Pathirannehelage (8)

The 2022 France Women's T20I Quadrangular Series was a Twenty20 International (T20I) cricket tournament that was held in Dreux, France, from 5 to 8 May 2022. The participants were the women's national sides of France, Austria, Jersey and Spain. Spain played their first official women's T20I matches during the tournament. Jersey won the series, after they went unbeaten in all four of their matches. France finished in second place, edging out Austria on net run rate, with Spain finishing fourth.

== Squads ==
Austria	France	Jersey	Spain
Gandhali Bapat (c, wk); Jo-Antoinette Stiglitz (vc); Rezarta Avdylaj; Valentina Avdylaj; Harjivan Bhullar; Bangalore Chamundaiah; Smriti Kohli; Anisha Nookala; Mahadewa Pathirannehelage; Priya Sabu; Ashmaan Saifee; Hannah Simpson-Parker; Raphaela Trobinger; Busra Uca	Marie Violleau (c); Lara Armas; Lena Armas; Sabine Baron; Cindy Bretéché; Tara Britton; Alix Brodin; Maëlle Cargouët (wk); Krystal Lemoine; Louise Lestavel; Poppy McGeown; Magali Marchello-Nizia; Beatrice Pierre; Ganesh Pooja; Blandine Verdon; Lydia Wykes-Templeman	Chloe Greechan (c); Charlie Miles (vc); Tea Brocklesby; Florrie Copley; Erin Duffy; Rosa Hill; Maria Da Rocha; Erin Gouge; Lily Greig; Mia Maguire (wk); Georgia Mallet; Olive Smith; Trinity Smith; Grace Wetherall	Elspeth Fowler (c); Samaia Basharat; Amy Brown-Carrera; Hifsa Butt; Rabia Iqbal; Zenab Iqbal; Jaspreet Kaur; Simranjit Kaur; Wania Malik; Tashiba Mirza (wk); Rabia Mushtaq; Muskan Naseeb; Memoona Riaz; Aliza Saleem (wk); Uswa Syed

== Points Table ==
Pos	Team	Pld	W	L	NR	Pts	NRR
1	Jersey	4	4	0	0	8	2.855
2	France	4	2	2	0	4	0.688
3	Austria	4	2	2	0	4	−0.575
4	Spain	4	0	4	0	0	−2.700

Source: ESPNcricinfo

== Fixtures ==
5 May 2022
11:00
Scorecard

France; 87/5 (20 overs)	v	Jersey; 90/3 (12.3 overs)
Ganesh Pooja 21 (36); Chloe Greechan 2/13 (4 overs)		Charlie Miles 39* (32); Marie Violleau 2/23 (3.3 overs)

Jersey won by 7 wickets
Dreux Sport Cricket Club, Dreux
Umpires: Hamza Niaz (Fra) and Ammar Zahir (Fra)
Player of the match: Charlie Miles (Jer)

- Jersey won the toss and elected to field.
- Ganesh Pooja, Blandine Verdon, Lydia Wykes-Templeman (Fra), Erin Duffy, Charlie Miles and Trinity Smith (Jer) all made their T20I debuts.

5 May 2022
15:00
Scorecard

Austria; 127/7 (20 overs)	v	Spain; 92 (18.5 overs)
Jo-Antoinette Stiglitz 29 (22); Rabia Iqbal 3/25 (2.3 overs)		Elspeth Fowler 26 (36); Mahadewa Pathirannehelage 5/16 (4 overs)

Austria won by 35 runs
Dreux Sport Cricket Club, Dreux
Umpires: Subbaraju Rajendran (Fra) and Ammar Zahir (Fra)
Player of the match: Mahadewa Pathirannehelage (Aut)

- Austria won the toss and elected to bat.
- Amy Brown-Carrera, Elspeth Fowler, Rabia Iqbal, Zenab Iqbal, Jaspreet Kaur, Simranjit Kaur, Tashiba Mirza, Rabia Mushtaq, Muskan Naseeb, Aliza Saleem and Uswa Syed (Esp) all made their T20I debuts.
- Mahadewa Pathirannehelage became the first cricketer for Austria to take a five-wicket haul in women's T20Is.

6 May 2022
11:00
Scorecard

Jersey; 175/4 (20 overs)	v	Spain; 108/6 (20 overs)
Trinity Smith 59* (43); Uswa Syed 1/20 (4 overs)		Elspeth Fowler 29 (46); Trinity Smith 2/18 (4 overs)

Jersey won by 67 runs
Dreux Sport Cricket Club, Dreux
Umpires: Hamza Niaz (Fra) and Mohammad Nisar (Fra)
Player of the match: Trinity Smith (Jer)

- Spain won the toss and elected to field.
- Olive Smith (Jer), Hifsa Butt, Wania Malik and Memoona Riaz (Esp) all made their T20I debuts.

6 May 2022
15:00
Scorecard

Jersey; 167/2 (20 overs)	v	Austria; 97/7 (20 overs)
Charlie Miles 57* (59); Mahadewa Pathirannehelage 1/21 (4 overs)		Gandhali Bapat 24 (32); Georgia Mallet 3/14 (3 overs)

Jersey won by 70 runs
Dreux Sport Cricket Club, Dreux
Umpires: Subbaraju Rajendran (Fra) and Ammar Zahir (Fra)
Player of the match: Charlie Miles (Jer)

- Jersey won the toss and elected to bat.

7 May 2022
11:00
Scorecard

France; 125/5 (20 overs)	v	Jersey; 126/4 (16.4 overs)
Poppy McGeown 50* (57); Erin Duffy 1/22 (4 overs)		Trinity Smith 56* (40); Cindy Bretéché 2/18 (3.4 overs)

Jersey won by 6 wickets
Dreux Sport Cricket Club, Dreux
Umpires: Subbaraju Rajendran (Fra) and Ammar Zahir (Fra)
Player of the match: Trinity Smith (Jer)

- Jersey won the toss and elected to field.

7 May 2022
15:00
Scorecard

Austria; 165/6 (20 overs)	v	Spain; 117/2 (20 overs)
Mahadewa Pathirannehelage 49 (51); Memoona Riaz 2/12 (3 overs)		Elspeth Fowler 44 (50); Valentina Avdylaj 1/14 (4 overs)

Austria won by 48 runs
Dreux Sport Cricket Club, Dreux
Umpires: Hamza Niaz (Fra) and Mohammad Nisar (Fra)
Player of the match: Mahadewa Pathirannehelage (Aut)

- Spain won the toss and elected to field.

8 May 2022
11:00
Scorecard

France; 163/5 (20 overs)	v	Spain; 97/3 (20 overs)
Ganesh Pooja 32* (40); Wania Malik 3/18 (2 overs)		Elspeth Fowler 42* (58); Lydia Wykes-Templeman 1/15 (4 overs)

France won by 66 runs
Dreux Sport Cricket Club, Dreux
Umpires: Hamza Niaz (Fra) and Mohammad Nisar (Fra)
Player of the match: Ganesh Pooja (Fra)

- Spain Women won the toss and elected to field.
- Louise Lestavel (Fra) made her T20I debut.

8 May 2022
15:00
Scorecard

France; 167/2 (20 overs)	v	Austria; 108 (20 overs)
Tara Britton 68* (63); Mahadewa Pathirannehelage 1/24 (4 overs)		Mahadewa Pathirannehelage 20 (18); Poppy McGeown 2/18 (4 overs); Lydia Wykes-Templeman 2/18 (4 overs)

France won by 59 runs
Dreux Sport Cricket Club, Dreux
Umpires: Subbaraju Rajendran (Fra) and Ammar Zahir (Fra)
Player of the match: Tara Britton (Fra)

- France won the toss and elected to bat.
- Krystal Lemoine (Fra) made her T20I debut.
