= Jersey women's cricket team =

Cricket team

Jersey
- Flag of Jersey
- Association: Jersey Cricket Board

Personnel
- Captain: Chloe Greechan
- Coach: Darren Thomas

International Cricket Council
- ICC status: Associate member (2007); Affiliate member (2005)
- ICC region: Europe
ICC Rankings	Current	Best-ever
T20I	29th	24th (22 Dec 2022)

T20 Internationals
- First T20I: Guernsey at College Field, Saint Peter Port; 31 May 2019
- Last T20I: Switzerland at Embrach Cricket Ground, Embrach; 29 July 2026
T20Is	Played	Won/Lost
Total	52	34/17 (0 ties, 1 no result)
This year	6	5/1 (0 ties, 0 no results)
- As of 29 July 2026

The Jersey women's cricket team represents the Crown dependency of Jersey in international women's cricket matches. They became an affiliate member of the International Cricket Council (ICC) in 2005, and an associate member in 2007.

== History ==
In 2012, Jersey won the European Women's Cricket Festival hosted in Utrecht, defeating Germany in the final.

In April 2018, the ICC granted full Women's Twenty20 International (WT20I) status to all its members. Therefore, all Twenty20 matches played between Jersey women and other ICC members after 1 July 2018 have the full WT20I status.

Jersey played their first WT20I on 31 May 2019, losing to neighbours Guernsey by seven wickets in the 2019 T20 Inter-Insular Cup at College Field, Saint Peter Port.

They got their first WT20I win later that year when they defeated Norway by seven wickets on 1 August on day two of the 2019 France Women's T20I Quadrangular Series held in Nantes. With four victories and two defeats, Jersey finished second behind hosts France in the tournament which also included Austria. Jersey's squad at the event featured several players still at school including Nia Greig who, aged just 11 years and 40 days, became the youngest-ever international cricketer when she played in the islanders' opening match against the French.

Trinity Smith scored the first WT20I half-century for Jersey on 6 May 2022, hitting 59 not out off 43 balls against Spain at the 2022 France Women's T20I Quadrangular Series. Unbeaten throughout, Jersey won the tournament in Dreux which also included France and Austria.

The following month, Jersey won the newly-expanded Women's T20I Inter-Insular Cup winning all three matches at home against Guernsey.

In January 2023, it was announced that Jersey had been chosen to host the inaugural 2023 ICC Women's T20 World Cup Europe Qualifier division two tournament to be staged in May and June.

At the event, the islanders finished third out of six teams to narrowly miss out on progressing to the next stage of qualification. During the competition, Chloe Greechan became the first Jersey woman to take a five-wicket haul in WT20Is when she bagged 5/4 in a 108-run win against Sweden on 2 June 2023.

Later that month, Jersey played Guernsey in the 2023 edition of the Women's T20I Inter-Insular Cup at King George V Sports Ground in Castel. For the second successive year they swept the contest 3-0 with the highlight being the third match where they scored their highest total in a WT20I to date - 196/3 - before dismissing the hosts for 39 to win by 157 runs which was a new record for their biggest winning margin.

Jersey retained the WT20I Inter-insular Cup for a third year in a row in 2024, winning a one-off match at Grainville Cricket Ground in St Saviour by 104 runs. Put into bat, the islanders' scored 157 all out with Charlie Miles making 68 off 42 balls, before they dismissed Guernsey for just 53 as Sophia Hanson took 3/7.

In December 2024, Jersey won the inaugural T10 European Cricket Championship Challenger Division, going unbeaten throughout the competition in Spain and defeating Germany by 15 runs in the final. They followed this success up by sweeping a two-match WT20I series against Gibraltar at Europa Sports Park, with winning margins of eight-wickets and nine-wickets respectively.

In April 2025, Jersey won the Cyprus WT20I Quadrangular Series, topping the table with six victories from six matches at the event which also included the hosts, Denmark and the Isle of Man.

In May 2025, Jersey finished third at the 2025 Women's T20 World Cup Europe Qualifier Division Two in Rome, recording two wins from their five matches to once again miss out on progressing to the next stage of the competition.

On 5 July 2025, Jersey defeated Guernsey by 89 runs under the DLS method in a rain-affected match in Castel to claim the WT20I Inter-Insular Cup for a fourth successive year.

Jersey retained the WT20I Inter-Insular Cup for the fifth year in a row on 14 June 2026, defeating Guernsey 2–0 with both matches ending in wins by 100 runs.

== Records and statistics ==
International Match Summary — Jersey Women

Last updated 29 July 2026

Playing Record
Format	M	W	L	T	NR	Inaugural Match
Twenty20 Internationals	52	34	17	0	1	31 May 2019

=== Twenty20 International ===
- Highest team total: 214/4 v Denmark on 18 April 2025 at Happy Valley Ground, Episkopi.
- Highest individual score: 85, Aimee Aikenhead v Guernsey on 14 June 2026 at Grainville Cricket Ground, Saint Saviour and 85*, Grace Wetherall v Switzerland at Embrach Cricket Ground, Embrach on 27 July 2026.
- Best individual bowling figures: 5/4, Chloe Greechan v Sweden on 2 June 2023 at FB Playing Fields, St Clement.

T20I record versus other nations

Records complete to WT20I #2934. Last updated 29 July 2026.

Opponent	M	W	L	T	NR	First match	First win
ICC Associate members
Austria	3	2	1	0	0	1 August 2019	3 August 2019
Brazil	3	0	3	0	0	3 September 2025	
Cyprus	2	2	0	0	0	18 April 2025	18 April 2025
Denmark	2	2	0	0	0	18 April 2025	18 April 2025
France	5	3	2	0	0	31 July 2019	2 August 2019
Germany	4	1	3	0	0	30 May 2023	27 July 2024
Gibraltar	2	2	0	0	0	15 December 2024	15 December 2024
Guernsey	10	9	1	0	0	31 May 2019	25 June 2022
Isle of Man	4	3	1	0	0	19 April 2025	19 April 2025
Italy	4	1	3	0	0	29 May 2023	29 May 2023
Netherlands	3	0	2	0	1	24 August 2023	
Norway	2	2	0	0	0	1 August 2019	1 August 2019
Spain	3	3	0	0	0	6 May 2022	6 May 2022
Sweden	2	1	1	0	0	2 June 2023	2 June 2023
Switzerland	2	2	0	0	0	27 July 2026	27 July 2026
Turkey	1	1	0	0	0	30 May 2023	30 May 2023

== Tournament history ==
=== ICC Women's World Cup ===
World Cup record
Year	Round	Position	GP	W	L	T	NR
(England) 1973	Did not qualify/No women's ODI status						
(India) 1978	Did not qualify/No women's ODI status						
(New Zealand) 1982	Did not qualify/No women's ODI status						
(Australia) 1988	Did not qualify/No women's ODI status						
(England) 1993	Did not qualify/No women's ODI status						
(India) 1997	Did not qualify/No women's ODI status						
(New Zealand) 2000	Did not qualify/No women's ODI status						
(South Africa) 2005	Did not qualify/No women's ODI status						
(Australia) 2009	Did not qualify/No women's ODI status						
(India) 2013	Did not qualify/No women's ODI status						
(England) 2017	Did not qualify/No women's ODI status						
(New Zealand) 2022	Did not qualify/No women's ODI status						
(India) 2025	Did not qualify/No women's ODI status						
Total	0/13	0 Titles	0	0	0	0	0

=== ICC Women's World T20 ===
Twenty20 World Cup Record
Year	Round	Position	GP	W	L	T	NR
(England) 2009	Did not qualify						
(Cricket West Indies) 2010	Did not qualify						
(Sri Lanka) 2012	Did not qualify						
(Bangladesh) 2014	Did not qualify						
(India) 2016	Did not qualify						
(Cricket West Indies) 2018	Did not qualify						
(Australia) 2020	Did not qualify						
(South Africa) 2023	Did not qualify						
(United Arab Emirates) 2024	Did not qualify						
(England) 2026	Did not qualify						
Total	0/10	0 Titles	0	0	0	0	0

=== ICC Women's World Twenty20 Europe Qualifier ===
ICC Women's Twenty20 Qualifier Europe records
Year	Round	Position	GP	W	L	T	NR
(Spain) 2019	Did not participate						
(Spain) 2021	Did not participate						
(Jersey) 2023	DNQ	–	5	3	2	0	0
(Italy) 2025	DNQ	–	5	2	3	0	0
Total	2/4	0 Title	10	5	5	0	0

=== Women's European Cricket Championship ===
Women's European Cricket Championship records
Year	Round	Position	GP	W	L	T	NR
(Denmark) 1989	Did not participate						
(England) 1990	Did not participate						
(Netherlands) 1991	Did not participate						
(Republic of Ireland) 1995	Did not participate						
(Denmark) 1999	Did not participate						
(England) 2001	Did not participate						
(Wales) 2005	Did not participate						
(Netherlands) 2007	Did not participate						
(Republic of Ireland) 2009	Did not participate						
(Scotland) 2010	Did not participate						
(Netherlands) 2011	Did not participate						
(England) 2014	Did not participate						
Total	0/12	0 Title	0	0	0	0	0

=== Cricket at Summer Olympics Games ===
Cricket at Summer Olympics records
Host Year	Round	Position	GP	W	L	T	NR
(United States) 2028	To be determined						
(Australia) 2032	To be determined						
Total	–	0 Title	0	0	0	0	0

=== ICC Women's T20 Champions Trophy ===
ICC Women's T20 Champions Trophy records
Host Year	Round	Position	GP	W	L	T	NR
(Sri Lanka) 2027	To be determined						
2031	To be determined						
Total	–	0 Title	0	0	0	0	0

== See also ==
- Jersey Cricket Board
- List of Jersey cricketers
- List of Jersey women Twenty20 International cricketers
