= College Field =

College Field may refer to:

- College Field (Michigan State), the original name for the football stadium used by Michigan State University that is now known as Spartan Stadium
- College Field (North Carolina), a defunct football stadium at Appalachian State University
- College Field (Oregon), the original name of defunct Bell Field at Oregon State University
- College Field, Saint Peter Port, a cricket ground
