= 2022 Women's T20I Inter-Insular Series =

International cricket tour

	Jersey	Guernsey
- Date: 25 June 2022 (Note: The series was played from 25–26 June; only the two matches played on 25 June had official WT20I status. Jersey won the three-match series 3–0.)
Captains	Chloe Greechan	Hannah Mechem

Twenty20 International series
- Results: Jersey won the 2-match series 2–0
Most runs	Lily Greig (52)	Rebecca Hubbard (49)
Most wickets	Chloe Greechan (3)	Emily Merrien (2); Claire Jennings (2)
- Player of the series: Chloe Greechan (Jer)

The 2022 Women's T20I Inter-Insular Series, consisting of two Women's Twenty20 International (WT20I) matches, took place in Jersey in June 2022. The series was originally scheduled to consist of three WT20I matches, but the third match was later changed to an unofficial contest. The venue for the matches was the Grainville Cricket Ground in St Saviour. The women's Inter-Insular competition was last contested in 2019, when Guernsey won a single WT20I match. The series followed the 2022 Men's T20I Inter-Insular Series which took place in Guernsey in May 2022. Jersey Women won all three matches in the series.

== Squads ==
Jersey	Guernsey
Chloe Greechan (c); Tea Brocklesby; Florrie Copley; Maria Da Rocha; Erin Duffy; Erin Gouge; Lily Greig; Rosa Hill; Mia Maguire (wk); Georgia Mallet (wk); Analise Merritt; Charlie Miles (wk); Trinity Smith; Grace Wetherall	Hannah Mechem (c); Eva Bourgaize; Francesca Bulpitt (wk); Rebecca Hubbard; Claire Jennings; Annie Le Ray; Marianne Le Ray; Emily Merrien; Charlotte Milner; Olivia Morgan; Molly Robinson; Jeanette Savage; Philippa Stahelin

== WT20I series ==
=== 1st WT20I ===
25 June 2022
11:00
Scorecard

Guernsey; 70/6 (20 overs)	v	Jersey; 71/1 (10.2 overs)
Rebecca Hubbard 34* (52); Florrie Copley 2/10 (4 overs)		Lily Greig 29* (37); Claire Jennings 1/7 (2 overs)

Jersey won by 9 wickets
Grainville Cricket Ground, St Saviour
Umpires: Jane Carpenter (Jer) and Mark Savage (Gue)

- Jersey won the toss and elected to field.
- Hannah Mechem, Marianne Le Ray, Emily Merrien, Charlotte Milner, Olivia Morgan and Molly Robinson (Gue) all made their WT20I debuts.

=== 2nd WT20I ===
25 June 2022
15:00
Scorecard

Jersey; 136/4 (20 overs)	v	Guernsey; 67/7 (20 overs)
Lily Greig 23 (30); Emily Merrien 2/13 (4 overs)		Rebecca Hubbard 15 (23); Rosa Hill 2/9 (2 overs)

Jersey won by 69 runs
Grainville Cricket Ground, St Saviour
Umpires: Michael Carpenter (Jer) and Mark Savage (Gue)
Player of the match: Emily Merrien (Gue)

- Guernsey won the toss and elected to field.

=== 3rd WT20I (unofficial) ===
26 June 2022
11:00
Scorecard

Jersey; 155/4 (20 overs)	v	Guernsey; 55/8 (20 overs)
Charlie Miles 73* (64); Molly Robinson 1/12 (20 overs)		Rebecca Hubbard 16 (32); Chloe Greechan 2/7 (4 overs)

Jersey won by 100 runs
Grainville Cricket Ground, St Saviour

- Jersey won the toss and elected bat.

== See also ==
- Inter-Insular cricket
- 2019 T20 Inter-Insular Cup
