= List of Turkey women Twenty20 International cricketers =

This is a list of Turkey women Twenty20 International cricketers. A Women's Twenty20 International (WT20I) is an international cricket match between two representative teams. A T20I is played under the rules of Twenty20 cricket. In April 2018, the International Cricket Council (ICC) granted full international status to Twenty20 women's matches played between member sides from 1 July 2018 onwards. Turkey women played their first WT20I on 29 May 2023 against Sweden during the 2023 ICC Women's T20 World Cup Europe Qualifier in Jersey.

The list is arranged in the order in which each player won her first Twenty20 cap. Where more than one player won her first Twenty20 cap in the same match, those players are listed alphabetically by surname.

== Key ==
General

- ‡ – Captain
- † – Wicket-keeper
- First – Year of debut
- Last – Year of latest game
- Mat – Number of matches played

Batting

- Runs – Runs scored in career
- HS – Highest score
- Avg – Runs scored per dismissal
- * – Batsman remained not out
- 50 – Number of half centuries
- 100 – Centuries scored

Bowling

- Balls – Balls bowled in career
- Wkt – Wickets taken in career
- BBI – Best bowling in an innings
- Ave – Average runs per wicket

Fielding

- Ca – Catches taken
- St – Stumpings affected

== Players ==
Statistics are correct as of 30 August 2026.

Turkey women T20I cricketers
General					Batting					Bowling				Fielding		Ref
No.	Name	First	Last	Mat	Runs	HS	Avg	50	100	Balls	Wkt	BBI	Ave	Ca	St	Ref
1	Goksu Ayan‡	2023	2026	14	79	30	7.18	0	0	211	9	2/28	25.66	2	0	
2	Kubra Canavarci‡	2023	2026	13	112	28	8.61	0	0	219	11	3/5	22.00	1	0	
3	Gulce Cengiz	2023	2025	10	116	54	16.57	1	0	102	3	1/7	46.66	2	0	
4	Ozlem Essiz	2023	2023	5	20	8	4.00	0	0	–	–	–	–	1	0	
5	Ezgi Nur Kilic	2023	2026	16	108	25	9.00	0	0	294	21	3/5	11.76	1	0	
6	Yaprak Karadogan†	2023	2023	3	1	1	0.50	0	0	–	–	–	–	0	0	
7	Gulhatun Keles	2023	2026	16	125	54*	12.50	1	0	–	–	–	–	2	0	
8	Hatice Okcu	2023	2023	5	16	12*	4.00	0	0	–	–	–	–	0	0	
9	Rabia Sahan	2023	2023	5	18	7*	6.00	0	0	30	1	1/13	27.00	1	0	
10	Rumeysa Alp	2023	2023	3	3	2*	3.00	0	0	24	0	–	–	1	0	
11	Burcu Taylan‡	2023	2023	5	56	36	11.20	0	0	72	1	1/26	76.00	0	0	
12	Havva Karaduman†	2023	2023	2	4	4	2.00	0	0	–	–	–	–	0	0	
13	Merve Sert	2023	2023	2	1	1	0.50	0	0	–	–	–	–	0	0	
14	Zehra Akpinar	2025	2025	2	14	9	7.00	0	0	–	–	–	–	0	0	
15	Melike Bayram	2025	2026	11	135	39	16.87	0	0	–	–	–	–	0	0	
16	Hacer Celik	2025	2026	12	120	54	30.00	0	0	225	19	4/6	9.94	5	0	
17	Ruveyda Cenik†	2025	2026	10	53	29*	10.60	0	0	–	–	–	–	0	1	
18	Saliha Ozkunduz	2025	2026	10	39	15	9.75	0	0	120	4	3/13	35.75	0	0	
19	Suzan Turan	2025	2026	11	105	26*	15.00	0	0	90	5	2/13	13.20	0	0	
20	Sila Yildrim	2025	2025	6	97	59	32.33	1	0	40	4	2/2	5.75	0	0	
21	Duygu Tekyildrim	2025	2026	10	101	40*	25.25	0	0	84	6	2/3	12.16	1	0	
22	Hanim Kavasoglu	2025	2025	2	0	0	0.00	0	0	–	–	–	–	1	0	
23	Zehra Ender	2025	2026	7	54	21	18.00	0	0	24	1	1/13	29.00	0	0	
24	Reyyan Aliusta	2026	2026	3	1	1	1.00	0	0	24	3	3/25	11.00	0	0	
25	Merve Ercin†	2026	2026	2	–	–	–	–	–	–	–	–	–	1	0	
26	Suheda Hancer	2026	2026	2	0	0	0.00	0	0	24	0	–	–	1	0	
