= Channel Islands cricket team =

The Channel Islands cricket team was a cricket team which was formed from the combined Jersey and Guernsey cricket teams and was representative of the Channel Islands. The team played Minor Counties cricket when it played in the MCCA Knockout Trophy in 2001 and 2002. The team played seven matches, with one scheduled match abandoned due to rain. It lost all of the matches which it played. The team played home matches on Grainville Cricket Ground at Saint Saviour, Jersey.

A combined Channel Islands team previously played minor matches against a United All-England Eleven in 1866, 1867 and 1869. It later appeared again in 1951 against the nomadic Arabs Cricket Club.
