= 2019 France Women's T20I Quadrangular Series =

- Dates: 31 July – 3 August 2019
- Cricket format: Women's Twenty20 International
- Tournament format: Double round-robin
- Host: France
- Champions: France
- Runners-up: Jersey
- Participants: 4
- Matches: 12
- Most runs: (Austria) Andrea-Mae Zepeda (125)
- Most wickets: (France) Emmanuelle Brelivet (10)

The 2019 France Women's T20I Quadrangular Series was a women's Twenty20 International (WT20I) cricket tournament held in Nantes, France, from 31 July to 3 August. The participants were the women's national sides of France, Austria, Jersey and Norway. Matches in the series were recognised as official WT20I games as per ICC's announcement that full WT20I status would apply to all the matches played between women's teams of associate members after 1 July 2018. Jersey Women were the only side of the four to have previously played a WT20I (against Guernsey Women on 31 May 2019). The matches were played at the Cricket Ground, Parc du Grand Blottereau in Nantes. France won the tournament after winning 5 of their 6 matches.

== Squads ==
Austria	France	Jersey	Norway
Andrea-Mae Zepeda (c); Albulena Avdylaj; Elvira Avdylaj; Rezarta Avdylaj; Valentina Avdylaj; Harjivan Bhullar; Harjot Dhaliwal (wk); Büsra Uca (wk); Sylvia Kailath; Tugce Kazanci (vc); Doris Kumar; Anisha Nookala; Priya Sabu	Emmanuelle Brelivet (c); Isabelle Costaz-Puyou (vc); Cindy Bretéché; Maëlle Cargouët (wk); Emma Chancé; Emmanuelle Chauveau; Jennifer King; Sabine Lieury; Magali Marchello-Nizia; Sophie Pécaud; Béatrice Pierre; Tracy Rodriguez; Irma Vrignaud (wk)	Rosa Hill (c); Chloe Greechan (vc); Taci Alker; Maria Da Rocha; Erin Gouge; Lily Greig; Nia Greig; Rose Heaney; Mia Maguire (wk); Georgia Mallet; Analise Merritt; Florence Tanguy; Grace Wetherall	Razia Ali Zade (c); Farial Zia Safdar (vc); Seemab Ahmed; Nayab Alizai; Mutaiba Ansar; Kiran Bhatti; Hina Hussain; Saira Ifzal; Ramya Immadi; Sangeerthana Raveendrakumar; Paw Shee; Say Shee; Aysha Waheed (wk)

== Points table ==
Team	P	W	L	T	NR	Pts	NRR
France (H)	6	5	1	0	0	10	+1.485
Jersey	6	4	2	0	0	8	+0.740
Austria	6	2	4	0	0	4	–0.774
Norway	6	1	5	0	0	2	–1.249

== Matches ==
31 July 2019
10:00
Scorecard

Jersey; 89/3 (20 overs)	v	France; 90/3 (13 overs)
Lily Greig 36 (64); Sophie Pécaud 1/12 (4 overs)		Isabelle Costaz-Puyou 34* (31); Chloe Greechan 1/21 (4 overs)

France won by 7 wickets
Cricket Ground, Parc du Grand Blottereau, Nantes
Umpires: Peter de Boeck (Fra) and Shezad Kanwal (Fra)

- France won the toss and elected to field.
- Emmanuelle Brelivet, Maëlle Cargouët, Emma Chancé, Emmanuelle Chauveau, Isabelle Costaz-Puyou, Jennifer King, Sabine Lieury, Magali Marchello-Nizia, Sophie Pécaud, Tracy Rodriguez, Irma Vrignaud (Fra), Maria Da Rocha and Nia Greig (Jer) all made their WT20I debuts.
- At the age of 11 years and 40 days, Nia Greig (Jer) became the youngest cricketer, male or female, to play in a T20I match.

31 July 2019
13:30
Scorecard

Norway; 120/9 (20 overs)	v	Austria; 104 (19.3 overs)
Mutaiba Ansar 41* (57); Doris Kumar 4/14 (4 overs)		Priya Sabu 14 (21); Farial Zia Safdar 3/10 (4 overs)

Norway won by 16 runs
Cricket Ground, Parc du Grand Blottereau, Nantes
Umpires: Jane Carpenter (Jer) and Shezad Kanwal (Fra)

- Norway won the toss and elected to bat.
- Elvira Avdylaj, Rezarta Avdylaj, Valentina Avdylaj, Harjivan Bhullar, Büsra Uca, Harjot Dhaliwal, Tugce Kazanci, Doris Kumar, Anisha Nookala, Priya Sabu, Andrea-Mae Zepeda (Aut), Nayab Alizai, Mutaiba Ansar, Kiran Bhatti, Hina Hussain, Saira Ifzal, Ramya Immadi, Shangeerthana Raveendrakumar, Farial Zia Safdar, Say Shee, Aysha Waheed, and Razia Ali Zade (Nor) all made their WT20I debuts.

31 July 2019
17:00 (D/N)
Scorecard

Norway; 70 (14.2 overs)	v	France; 71/2 (13.5 overs)
Kiran Bhatti 9 (13); Isabelle Costaz-Puyou 3/14 (3.2 overs)		Emmanuelle Chauveau 32* (44); Razia Ali Zade 1/13 (3 overs)

France won by 8 wickets
Cricket Ground, Parc du Grand Blottereau, Nantes
Umpires: Jane Carpenter (Jer) and Peter de Boeck (Fra)

- France won the toss and elected to field.
- Cindy Bretéché (Fra) and Paw Shee (Nor) both made their WT20I debuts.

1 August 2019
10:00
Scorecard

Austria; 98/3 (20 overs)	v	Jersey; 95/7 (20 overs)
Tugce Kazanci 17* (23); Florence Tanguy 1/14 (4 overs)		Analise Merritt 18 (29); Andrea-Mae Zepeda 3/18 (4 overs)

Austria won by 3 runs
Cricket Ground, Parc du Grand Blottereau, Nantes

- Austria won the toss and elected to bat.
- Sylvia Kailath (Aut) and Rose Heaney (Jer) both made their WT20I debuts.

1 August 2019
13:30
Scorecard

Austria; 76/9 (20 overs)	v	France; 79/2 (12.2 overs)
Andrea-Mae Zepeda 36* (58); Emmanuelle Brelivet 5/14 (4 overs)		Emmanuelle Brelivet 38* (38); Tugce Kazanci 1/12 (2 overs)

France won by 8 wickets
Cricket Ground, Parc du Grand Blottereau, Nantes
Umpires: Peter de Boeck (Fra) and Shezad Kanwal (Fra)

- France won the toss and elected to field
- Albulena Avdylaj (Aut) made her WT20I debut.

1 August 2019
17:00 (D/N)
Scorecard

Norway; 63 (19.1 overs)	v	Jersey; 64/3 (14.1 overs)
Farial Zia Safdar 20 (26); Analise Merritt 3/9 (4 overs)		Analise Merritt 17 (29); Farial Zia Safdar 2/15 (4 overs)

Jersey won by 7 wickets
Cricket Ground, Parc du Grand Blottereau, Nantes
Umpires: Jane Carpenter (Jer) and Shezad Kanwal (Fra)

- Norway won the toss and elected to bat.

2 August 2019
10:00
Scorecard

Norway; 78/4 (20 overs)	v	France; 79/2 (14.1 overs)
Farial Zia Safdar 19* (47); Jennifer King 2/9 (4 overs)		Emmanuelle Brelivet 19* (21); Hina Hussain 1/13 (3 overs)

France won by 8 wickets
Cricket Ground, Parc du Grand Blottereau, Nantes
Umpires: Mobashar Ashraf (Fra) and Peter de Boeck (Fra)

- Norway won the toss and elected to bat.

2 August 2019
13:30
Scorecard

France; 122/4 (20 overs)	v	Jersey; 123/5 (18.3 overs)
Irma Vrignaud 40 (49); Florence Tanguy 2/22 (4 overs)		Analise Merritt 34 (50); Tracy Rodriguez 2/19 (2.3 overs)

Jersey won by 5 wickets
Cricket Ground, Parc du Grand Blottereau, Nantes
Umpires: Peter de Boeck (Fra) and Iqbal Mudassar (Fra)

- Jersey won the toss and elected to field.
- Taci Alker (Jer) made her WT20I debut.

2 August 2019
17:00 (D/N)
Scorecard

Norway; 99/5 (20 overs)	v	Austria; 100/4 (17.4 overs)
Nayab Alizai 21 (35); Valentina Avdylaj 2/18 (4 overs)		Andrea-Mae Zepeda 43* (43); Farial Zia Safdar 1/11 (4 overs)

Austria won by 6 wickets
Cricket Ground, Parc du Grand Blottereau, Nantes
Umpires: Shezad Kanwal (Fra) and Iqbal Mudassar (Fra)

- Norway won the toss and elected to field.

3 August 2019
09:30
Scorecard

Austria; 77/6 (20 overs)	v	Jersey; 78/1 (15 overs)
Sylvia Kailath 15 (26); Florence Tanguy 2/13 (4 overs)		Lily Greig 31* (43); Andrea-Mae Zepeda 1/11 (4 overs)

Jersey won by 9 wickets
Cricket Ground, Parc du Grand Blottereau, Nantes
Umpires: Mobashar Ashraf (Fra) and Peter de Boeck (Fra)

- Austria won the toss and elected to bat.

3 August 2019
13:00
Scorecard

Norway; 33 (12.1 overs)	v	Jersey; 34/1 (8.4 overs)
Farial Zia Safdar 6 (9); Rosa Hill 4/16 (4 overs)		Lily Greig 18* (27); Hina Hussain 1/10 (3 overs)

Jersey won by 9 wickets
Cricket Ground, Parc du Grand Blottereau, Nantes
Umpires: Peter de Boeck (Fra) and Shezad Kanwal (Fra)

- Norway won the toss and elected to bat.

3 August 2019
16:30 (D/N)
Scorecard

Austria; 99/6 (20 overs)	v	France; 101/3 (17 overs)
Andrea-Mae Zepeda 27 (44); Isabelle Costaz-Puyou 2/16 (4 overs)		Jennifer King 46* (51); Andrea-Mae Zepeda 2/8 (4 overs)

France won by 7 wickets
Cricket Ground, Parc du Grand Blottereau, Nantes
Umpires: Shezad Kanwal (Fra) and Iqbal Mudassar (Fra)

- France won the toss and elected to field.
