= 2023 Women's T20 World Cup Europe Qualifier =

International cricket tournament

The 2023 ICC Women's T20 World Cup Europe Qualifier was a cricket tournament that formed part of the qualification process for the 2024 ICC Women's T20 World Cup. In an expanded qualification pathway for women's cricket in Europe, this was the first time that a second division was included. The first stage of the tournament was Division Two, held in Jersey in May and June 2023. Six teams played in Division Two, with the top two sides progressing to Division One, which was played in Spain in September 2023. The top two teams in Division One advanced to the 2024 ICC Women's T20 World Cup Qualifier along with Ireland, Sri Lanka and six other regional qualifiers.

France and Italy advanced from Division Two. Scotland and Netherlands were the top two sides in Division One and therefore advanced to the global qualifier. Scotland won the event on net run rate, but Netherlands' Iris Zwilling was named player of the tournament.

In November 2023, following the conclusion of the qualifier, it was reported that the Association France Cricket may have fabricated data about women's cricket activities in the country in order to meet ICC eligibility requirements for participation in the World Cup qualification process.

== Teams ==
Division Two	Division One
France; Germany; Italy; Jersey; Sweden; Turkey	France; Italy; Netherlands; Scotland

== Division Two ==
2023 ICC Women's T20 World Cup Europe Qualifier Division Two
- Dates: 29 May – 2 June 2023
- Administrator: ICC Europe
- Cricket format: Twenty20 International
- Tournament format: Round-robin
- Host: Jersey
- Champions: France
- Runners-up: Italy
- Participants: 6
- Matches: 15
- Most runs: (Germany) Christina Gough (250)
- Most wickets: (Jersey) Chloe Greechan (11)

=== Squads ===
France	Germany	Italy	Jersey	Sweden	Turkey
Marie Violleau (c); Lara Armas; Anika Bester; Emmanuelle Brelivet; Tara Britton (wk); Thea Graham; Prabhashi Mahawattage; Poppy McGeown; Ines McKeon (wk); Emma Patel; Ganesh Pooja; Amy Seddon; Blandine Verdon; Lydie Wykes-Templeman	Anuradha Doddaballapur (c); Ashwini Balaji; Emma Bargna; Milena Beresford; Anne Bierwisch; Christina Gough; Asmita Kohli; Shravya Kolcharam; Sharmaine Mannan; Suzanne McAnanama-Brereton; Sabeena Noor; Sharanya Sadarangani (wk); Rameesha Shahid; Karthika Vijayaraghavan (wk)	Kumudu Peddrick (c); Sharon Withanage (vc); Emilia Bartram; Gayathri Batagoda; Nimesha Ekanayake; Kirandeep Kaur; Chathurika Mahamalage; Sadalee Malwatta; Dilaisha Nanayakkara; Methnara Rathnayake (wk); Dishani Samarawickrama; Regina Suddahazai; Sonia Toffoletto; Anne Warnakulasuriya	Chloe Greechan (c); Aimee Aikenhead; Florrie Copley; Maria Da Rocha; Erin Duffy; Erin Gouge; Lily Greig; Sophia Hanson; Mia Maguire (wk); Georgia Mallet (wk); Analise Merritt; Charlie Miles (wk); Trinity Smith; Grace Wetherall	Gunjan Shukla (c); Kanchan Rana (vc); Meghana Alugunoolla (wk); Eman Asim; Saanvi Bhanushali; Ekaterina Bogdanova; Hareer Chamto; Sofie Elmesioo; Imali Jayasooriya; Signe Lundell (wk); Surya Ravuri; Rashmi Somashekhar; Elsa Thelander; Anya Vaidya	~~Basak Cosgun~~ (c); Burcu Taylan (c); Rumeysa Alp; Goksu Ayan; Kubra Canavarci; Gulce Cengiz; Ozlem Essiz; Yaprak Karadogan (wk); Havva Karaduman (wk); Gulhatun Keles; Ezgi Nur Kilic; Hatice Okcu; Rabia Sahan; Merve Sert

=== Points table ===
Pos	Team	Pld	W	L	NR	Pts	NRR	Qualification
1	France	5	4	1	0	8	1.736	Advanced to Division One
2	Italy	5	4	1	0	8	0.833	Advanced to Division One
3	Jersey	5	3	2	0	6	2.674	
4	Germany	5	3	2	0	6	0.939	
5	Sweden	5	1	4	0	2	−1.408	
6	Turkey	5	0	5	0	0	−5.507	

Source: ESPNcricinfo

=== Fixtures ===
29 May 2023
11:00
Scorecard

Italy; 42 (11.4 overs)	v	Jersey; 46/3 (7.2 overs)
Methnara Rathnayake 14 (13); Georgia Mallet 4/5 (3 overs)		Charlie Miles 22* (21); Chathurika Mahamalage 1/26 (4 overs)

Jersey won by 7 wickets
Grainville Cricket Ground, St Saviour
Umpires: Anna Harris (Eng) and David McLean (Sco)
Player of the match: Georgia Mallet (Jer)

- Italy won the toss and elected to bat.
- Aimee Aikenhead (Jer) and Regina Suddahazai (Ita) both made their T20I debuts.

29 May 2023
11:00
Scorecard

Turkey; 51/8 (20 overs)	v	Sweden; 52/0 (7 overs)
Gulhatun Keles 8 (20); Surya Ravuri 3/7 (4 overs)		Signe Lundell 22* (20)

Sweden won by 10 wickets
FB Playing Fields, St Clement
Umpires: Jareth McCready (Ire) and Jasmine Naeem (Eng)
Player of the match: Surya Ravuri (Swe)

- Sweden won the toss and elected to field.
- Hareer Chamto, Saanvi Bhanushali (Swe), Rumeysa Alp, Goksu Ayan, Kubra Canavarci, Gulce Cengiz, Ozlem Essiz, Yaprak Karadogan, Gulhatun Keles, Ezgi Nur Kilic, Hatice Okcu, Rabia Sahan and Burcu Taylan (Tur) all made their T20I debuts.

29 May 2023
16:00
Scorecard

France; 104/8 (20 overs)	v	Italy; 105/4 (15.4 overs)
Marie Violleau 22 (31); Dilaisha Nanayakkara 2/16 (4 overs)		Emilia Bartram 44* (31); Thea Graham 2/11 (3.4 overs)

Italy won by 6 wickets
Grainville Cricket Ground, St Saviour
Umpires: Anna Harris (Eng) and Heath Kearns (Jer)
Player of the match: Emilia Bartram (Ita)

- France won the toss and elected to bat.
- Prabhashi Mahawattage (Fra) made her T20I debut.

29 May 2023
16:00
Scorecard

Turkey; 57 (18.1 overs)	v	Germany; 58/0 (7 overs)
Gulce Cengiz 11* (26); Asmita Kohli 2/5 (4 overs)		Anne Bierwisch 24* (22)

Germany won by 10 wickets
FB Playing Fields, St Clement
Umpires: Ryan Milne (Sco) and Jasmine Naeem (Eng)
Player of the match: Asmita Kohli (Ger)

- Germany won the toss and elected to field.
- Rameesha Shahid (Ger) made her T20I debut.

30 May 2023
11:00
Scorecard

Jersey; 121/6 (20 overs)	v	Germany; 122/1 (18.4 overs)
Grace Wetherall 57* (40); Anuradha Doddaballapur 3/12 (4 overs)		Christina Gough 70* (69); Chloe Greechan 1/16 (3.4 overs)

Germany won by 9 wickets
Grainville Cricket Ground, St Saviour
Umpires: David McLean (Sco) and Ryan Milne (Sco)
Player of the match: Christina Gough (Ger)

- Germany won the toss and elected to field.
- The unbroken partnership (101) between Analise Merritt and Grace Wetherall (Jer) was a record for the seventh wicket in T20Is.

30 May 2023
11:00
Scorecard

France; 149/5 (20 overs)	v	Sweden; 101/8 (20 overs)
Ines McKeon 94 (65); Anya Vaidya 2/16 (4 overs)		Gunjan Shukla 31 (33); Anika Bester 2/16 (4 overs)

France won by 48 runs
FB Playing Fields, St Clement
Umpires: Heath Kearns (Jer) and Jasmine Naeem (Eng)
Player of the match: Ines McKeon (Fra)

- Sweden won the toss and elected to field.

30 May 2023
16:00
Scorecard

Turkey; 52 (18.5 overs)	v	Jersey; 54/1 (6 overs)
Hatice Okcu 12* (30); Erin Gouge 3/6 (2.5 overs)		Charlie Miles 23 (17); Goksu Ayan 1/14 (1 over)

Jersey won by 9 wickets
Grainville Cricket Ground, St Saviour
Umpires: Jareth McCready (Ire) and Ryan Milne (Sco)
Player of the match: Erin Gouge (Jer)

- Jersey won the toss and elected to field.
- Havva Karaduman and Merve Sert (Tur) both made their T20I debuts.

30 May 2023
16:00
Scorecard

Italy; 134/5 (20 overs)	v	Sweden; 98 (18.1 overs)
Chathurika Mahamalage 53* (62); Gunjan Shukla 2/12 (4 overs)		Anya Vaidya 51 (37); Sharon Withanage 2/6 (1.1 overs)

Italy won by 36 runs
FB Playing Fields, St Clement
Umpires: Anna Harris (Eng) and Heath Kearns (Jer)
Player of the match: Chathurika Mahamalage (Ita)

- Sweden won the toss and elected to field.

1 June 2023
11:00
Scorecard

Germany; 142/3 (20 overs)	v	Italy; 143/3 (19.4 overs)
Christina Gough 87* (60); Regina Suddahazai 2/22 (4 overs)		Dilaisha Nanayakkara 36 (30); Milena Beresford 1/11 (2 overs)

Italy won by 7 wickets
Grainville Cricket Ground, St Saviour
Umpires: Heath Kearns (Jer) and Ryan Milne (Sco)
Player of the match: Christina Gough (Ger)

- Italy won the toss and elected to field.

1 June 2023
11:00
Scorecard

France; 169/4 (20 overs)	v	Turkey; 41 (11.4 overs)
Poppy McGeown 58* (48); Ezgi Nur Kilic 3/35 (4 overs)		Kubra Canavarci 9 (18); Prabhashi Mahawattage 3/16 (3.4 overs)

France won by 128 runs
FB Playing Fields, St Clement
Umpires: Jareth McCready (Ire) and David McLean (Sco)
Player of the match: Poppy McGeown (Fra)

- Turkey won the toss and elected to field.

1 June 2023
16:00
Scorecard

Sweden; 139/6 (20 overs)	v	Germany; 140/3 (18.2 overs)
Signe Lundell 49 (42); Anuradha Doddaballapur 2/19 (4 overs)		Christina Gough 72* (59); Imali Jayasooriya 1/10 (2 overs)

Germany won by 7 wickets
Grainville Cricket Ground, St Saviour
Umpires: Heath Kearns (Jer) and Jasmine Naeem (Eng)
Player of the match: Christina Gough (Ger)

- Germany won the toss and elected to field.

1 June 2023
16:00
Scorecard

France; 110/8 (20 overs)	v	Jersey; 104 (19.3 overs)
Ines McKeon 35 (32); Grace Wetherall 3/15 (3 overs)		Trinity Smith 21 (29); Anika Bester 4/20 (4 overs)

France won by 6 runs
FB Playing Fields, St Clement
Umpires: Anna Harris (Eng) and Jareth McCready (Ire)
Player of the match: Anika Bester (Fra)

- France won the toss and elected to bat.
- Sophia Hanson (Jer) made her T20I debut.

2 June 2023
11:00
Scorecard

Italy; 163/5 (20 overs)	v	Turkey; 75/9 (20 overs)
Sharon Withanage 58 (50); Kubra Canavarci 2/23 (4 overs)		Burcu Taylan 36 (38); Regina Suddahazai 3/8 (4 overs)

Italy won by 88 runs
Grainville Cricket Ground, St Saviour
Umpires: Anna Harris (Eng) and David McLean (Sco)
Player of the match: Sharon Withanage (Ita)

- Turkey won the toss and elected to field.

2 June 2023
11:00
Scorecard

Jersey; 129/7 (20 overs)	v	Sweden; 21 (9.3 overs)
Chloe Greechan 27 (27); Gunjan Shukla 2/15 (4 overs)		Kanchan Rana 4 (6); Chloe Greechan 5/4 (4 overs)

Jersey won by 108 runs
FB Playing Fields, St Clement
Umpires: Jareth McCready (Ire) and Ryan Milne (Sco)
Player of the match: Chloe Greechan (Jer)

- Sweden won the toss and elected to field.
- Chloe Greechan became the first woman for Jersey to take a five-wicket haul in T20Is.

2 June 2023
16:00
Scorecard

France; 112/9 (20 overs)	v	Germany; 99/6 (20 overs)
Poppy McGeown 34 (23); Christina Gough 3/11 (4 overs)		Sharanya Sadarangani 32* (43); Thea Graham 1/11 (2 overs)

France won by 13 runs
Grainville Cricket Ground, St Saviour
Umpires: David McLean (Sco) and Jasmine Naeem (Eng)
Player of the match: Poppy McGeown (Fra)

- France won the toss and elected to bat.

== Division One ==
2023 ICC Women's T20 World Cup Europe Qualifier Division One
- Dates: 6 – 12 September 2023
- Administrator: ICC Europe
- Cricket format: Twenty20 International
- Tournament format: Double round-robin
- Host: Spain
- Champions: Scotland
- Runners-up: Netherlands
- Participants: 4
- Matches: 12
- Player of the series: (Netherlands) Iris Zwilling
- Most runs: (Scotland) Sarah Bryce (176)
- Most wickets: (Netherlands) Robine Rijke (11)

=== Squads ===
The following squads were named for the tournament.

France	Italy	Netherlands	Scotland
Marie Violleau (c); Anika Bester; Tara Britton (wk); Maëlle Cargouët; Thea Graham; Prabhashi Mahawattage; Magali Marchello-Nizia; Poppy McGeown; Ines McKeon; Emma Patel; Ganesh Pooja (wk); Amy Seddon; Blandine Verdon; Lydie Wykes-Templeman	Kumudu Peddrick (c); Emilia Bartram (vc); Gayathri Batagoda; Nimesha Ekanayake; Sewmini Kanankege; Chathurika Mahamalage; Sadalee Malwatta; Dilaisha Nanayakkara; Methnara Rathnayake (wk); Dishani Samarawickrama; Regina Suddahazai; Sonia Toffoletto; Anne Warnakulasuriya; Sharon Withanage	Heather Siegers (c, wk); Merel Dekeling; Caroline de Lange; Babette de Leede (wk); Sterre Kalis; Hannah Landheer; Eva Lynch; Phebe Molkenboer; Robine Rijke; Myrthe van den Raad; Isabel van der Woning; Carlijn van Koolwijk; Iris Zwilling; Mikkie Zwilling	Kathryn Bryce (c); Chloe Abel; ~~Abbi Aitken-Drummond~~; ~~Olivia Bell~~; Sarah Bryce (wk); Darcey Carter; Priyanaz Chatterji; Maryam Faisal; Lorna Jack; Ailsa Lister (wk); Abtaha Maqsood; Megan McColl; Hannah Rainey; Niamh Robertson-Jack; Nayma Sheikh; Ellen Watson

Ahead of the tournament, Niamh Robertson-Jack and Ellen Watson were added to Scotland's squad to replace the unavailable pair of Abbi Aitken-Drummond and Olivia Bell.

=== Points table ===
Pos	Team	Pld	W	L	NR	Pts	NRR	Qualification
1	Scotland	6	5	1	0	10	3.777	Advanced to the global qualifier
2	Netherlands	6	5	1	0	10	2.377	Advanced to the global qualifier
3	Italy	6	2	4	0	4	−1.982	
4	France	6	0	6	0	0	−4.566	

Source: ESPNcricinfo

=== Fixtures ===
6 September 2023
10:30
Scorecard

France; 83/9 (20 overs)	v	Netherlands; 84/2 (8.1 overs)
Marie Violleau 38 (39); Robine Rijke 3/15 (4 overs)		Iris Zwilling 36 (18); Thea Graham 1/12 (1 over)

Netherlands won by 8 wickets
Desert Springs Cricket Ground, Almería
Umpires: Heath Kearns (Jer) and Adnan Khan (Esp)
Player of the match: Iris Zwilling (Ned)

- Netherlands won the toss and elected to field.

6 September 2023
15:30
Scorecard

Italy; 88/7 (20 overs)	v	Scotland; 89/1 (8.3 overs)
Methnara Rathnayake 30 (26); Hannah Rainey 2/13 (4 overs)		Ailsa Lister 54* (28); Dilaisha Nanayakkara 1/10 (1 over)

Scotland won by 9 wickets
Desert Springs Cricket Ground, Almería
Umpires: Rizwan Akram (Ned) and Heath Kearns (Jer)
Player of the match: Ailsa Lister (Sco)

- Italy won the toss and elected to bat.
- Chloe Abel, Maryam Faisal and Niamh Robertson-Jack (Sco) all made their T20I debuts.

7 September 2023
10:30
Scorecard

Netherlands; 134/7 (20 overs)	v	Scotland; 99 (19 overs)
Sterre Kalis 68 (55); Hannah Rainey 2/22 (4 overs); Chloe Abel 2/22 (4 overs)		Chloe Abel 25 (16); Phebe Molkenboer 3/11 (3 overs)

Netherlands won by 35 runs
Desert Springs Cricket Ground, Almería
Umpires: Rizwan Akram (Ned) and Adnan Khan (Esp)
Player of the match: Sterre Kalis (Ned)

- Scotland won the toss and elected to field.

7 September 2023
15:30
Scorecard

Italy; 137/5 (20 overs)	v	France; 75 (17.3 overs)
Emilia Bartram 50* (44); Thea Graham 2/22 (4 overs)		Ines McKeon 14 (11); Kumudu Peddrick 4/10 (4 overs)

Italy won by 62 runs
Desert Springs Cricket Ground, Almería
Umpires: Heath Kearns (Jer) and Adnan Khan (Esp)
Player of the match: Emilia Bartram (Ita)

- Italy won the toss and elected to bat.

8 September 2023
10:30
Scorecard

Italy; 74/8 (20 overs)	v	Netherlands; 75/1 (10.1 overs)
Regina Suddahazai 26* (49); Caroline de Lange 2/10 (4 overs)		Sterre Kalis 28* (23); Kumudu Peddrick 1/20 (3 overs)

Netherlands won by 9 wickets
Desert Springs Cricket Ground, Almería
Umpires: Rizwan Akram (Ned) and Heath Kearns (Jer)
Player of the match: Iris Zwilling (Ned)

- Netherlands won the toss and elected to field.

8 September 2023
15:30
Scorecard

France; 106/7 (20 overs)	v	Scotland; 109/3 (12.4 overs)
Ines McKeon 56 (40); Kathryn Bryce 3/8 (4 overs)		Kathryn Bryce 51 (33); Anika Bester 2/23 (4 overs)

Scotland won by 7 wickets
Desert Springs Cricket Ground, Almería
Umpires: Rizwan Akram (Ned) and Adnan Khan (Esp)
Player of the match: Kathryn Bryce (Sco)

- France won the toss and elected to bat.

10 September 2023
10:30
Scorecard

Scotland; 200/6 (20 overs)	v	Italy; 83 (19.4 overs)
Sarah Bryce 67 (40); Kumudu Peddrick 2/26 (3 overs)		Chathurika Mahamalage 21 (30); Darcey Carter 3/12 (4 overs)

Scotland won by 117 runs
Desert Springs Cricket Ground, Almería
Umpires: Heath Kearns (Jer) and Adnan Khan (Esp)
Player of the match: Sarah Bryce (Sco)

- Scotland won the toss and elected to bat.

10 September 2023
15:30
Scorecard

France; 73 (20 overs)	v	Netherlands; 75/1 (6.2 overs)
Amy Seddon 26 (32); Robine Rijke 4/7 (4 overs)		Heather Siegers 47 (18); Emma Patel 1/12 (1 over)

Netherlands won by 9 wickets
Desert Springs Cricket Ground, Almería
Umpires: Rizwan Akram (Ned) and Heath Kearns (Jer)
Player of the match: Robine Rijke (Ned)

- Netherlands won the toss and elected to field.

11 September 2023
10:30
Scorecard

France; 80 (19.3 overs)	v	Italy; 81/1 (14.3 overs)
Amy Seddon 23 (26); Chathurika Mahamalage 2/5 (3 overs)		Sharon Withanage 37 (55); Prabhashi Mahawattage 1/8 (3 overs)

Italy won by 9 wickets
Desert Springs Cricket Ground, Almería
Umpires: Rizwan Akram (Ned) and Adnan Khan (Esp)
Player of the match: Chathurika Mahamalage (Ita)

- France won the toss and elected to bat.

11 September 2023
15:30
Scorecard

Scotland; 122/7 (20 overs)	v	Netherlands; 63 (15.3 overs)
Sarah Bryce 49 (43); Eva Lynch 2/21 (4 overs)		Heather Siegers 23 (12); Darcey Carter 3/11 (4 overs)

Scotland won by 59 runs
Desert Springs Cricket Ground, Almería
Umpires: Heath Kearns (Jer) and Adnan Khan (Esp)
Player of the match: Sarah Bryce (Sco)

- Netherlands won the toss and elected to field.

12 September 2023
10:30
Scorecard

Scotland; 204/4 (20 overs)	v	France; 49 (14.2 overs)
Ailsa Lister 68* (36); Emma Patel 2/40 (3 overs)		Amy Seddon 16 (20); Priyanaz Chatterji 3/7 (3 overs)

Scotland won by 155 runs
Desert Springs Cricket Ground, Almería
Umpires: Rizwan Akram (Ned) and Heath Kearns (Jer)
Player of the match: Kathryn Bryce (Sco)

- Scotland won the toss and elected to bat.

12 September 2023
15:30
Scorecard

Italy; 78/7 (20 overs)	v	Netherlands; 79/4 (10.3 overs)
Regina Suddahazai 21* (30); Robine Rijke 2/14 (4 overs)		Robine Rijke 36 (19); Emilia Bartram 2/12 (4 overs)

Netherlands won by 6 wickets
Desert Springs Cricket Ground, Almería
Umpires: Rizwan Akram (Ned) and Adnan Khan (Esp)
Player of the match: Robine Rijke (Ned)

- Italy won the toss and elected to bat.
- Myrthe van den Raad (Ned) made her T20I debut.
