= Turkey women's national cricket team =

Cricket team

Turkey
- Flag of Turkey
- Association: Turkish Cricket Board

International Cricket Council
- ICC status: Associate member (2017); Affiliate member (2008)
- ICC region: Europe
ICC Rankings	Current	Best-ever
T20I	43rd	43rd (25 Aug 2025)

T20 Internationals
- First T20I: v. Sweden at FB Playing Fields, St Clement; 29 May 2023
- Last T20I: v. Isle of Man at Moara Vlasei Cricket Ground, Ilfov County; 30 August 2026
T20Is	Played	Won/Lost
Total	17	10/7 (0 ties, 0 no results)
This year	4	4/0 (0 ties, 0 no results)
T20I home kit
T20I away kit
- As of 30 August 2026

The Turkey national women's cricket team represents Turkey in international women's cricket. In April 2018, the International Cricket Council (ICC) granted full Women's Twenty20 International (WT20I) status to all its members. Therefore, all Twenty20 matches played between Turkey women and other ICC members after 1 July 2018 are full WT20I matches.

The Turkey women's team were scheduled to make their debut at the 2021 ICC Women's T20 World Cup Europe Qualifier. However, in August 2021, they were forced to withdraw from the tournament, as they were unable to get approval to travel from the Turkish Sports Ministry because of COVID-19 restrictions.

In December 2020, the ICC announced the qualification pathway for the 2023 ICC Women's T20 World Cup and the Turkey women's team were named in Division two of the European Qualifier. Finally they made their debut during the 2023 ICC Women's T20 World Cup Europe Qualifier against Sweden on 29 May 2023.

In August 2026, Turkey won the Women's T20 Continental Cup in Romania, defeating Isle of Man by five wickets in the final.

== Records and statistics ==
International Match Summary — Turkey Women

Last updated 30 August 2026

Playing Record
Format	M	W	L	T	NR	Inaugural Match
Twenty20 Internationals	17	10	7	0	0	29 May 2023

- Highest team total: 221/4 v Bulgaria on 8 July 2025 at Vasil Levski National Sports Academy, Sofia.
- Highest individual score: 59, Sila Yildirim v Bulgaria on 8 July 2025 at Vasil Levski National Sports Academy, Sofia.
- Best individual bowling figures: 4/28, Hacer Celik v Austria on 10 October 2025 at Moara Vlasei Cricket Ground, Ilfov County.

=== Twenty20 International ===
T20I record versus other nations

Records complete to WT20I #2984. Last updated 30 August 2026.

Opponent	M	W	L	T	NR	First match	First win
ICC Associate members
Austria	2	1	1	0	0	10 October 2025	26 August 2026
Bulgaria	2	2	0	0	0	8 July 2025	8 July 2025
Czech Republic	1	1	0	0	0	27 August 2026	27 August 2026
France	1	0	1	0	0	1 June 2023	
Germany	1	0	1	0	0	29 May 2023	
Greece	2	2	0	0	0	7 July 2025	7 July 2025
Guernsey	1	1	0	0	0	26 August 2026	26 August 2026
Isle of Man	1	1	0	0	0	30 August 2026	30 August 2026
Italy	1	0	1	0	0	2 June 2023	
Jersey	1	0	1	0	0	30 May 2023	
Norway	1	0	1	0	0	11 October 2025	
Romania	1	1	0	0	0	10 October 2025	10 October 2025
Serbia	1	1	0	0	0	7 July 2025	7 July 2025
Sweden	1	0	1	0	0	29 May 2023	

== See also ==
- List of Turkey women Twenty20 International cricketers
