= List of Guernsey women Twenty20 International cricketers =

This is a list of Guernsey women Twenty20 International cricketers. A Twenty20 International is an international cricket match between two representative teams, each having Twenty20 International status, as determined by the International Cricket Council (ICC). A Twenty20 International is played under the rules of Twenty20 cricket.

This list includes all players who have played at least one T20I match and is initially arranged in the order of debut appearance. Where more than one player won their first cap in the same match, those players are initially listed alphabetically at the time of debut.

== Key ==
General

- ‡ – Captain
- † – Wicket-keeper
- First – Year of debut
- Last – Year of latest game
- Mat – Number of matches played

Batting

- Runs – Runs scored in career
- HS – Highest score
- Avg – Runs scored per dismissal
- * – Batsman remained not out
- 50 – Number of half centuries

Bowling

- Balls – Balls bowled in career
- Wkt – Wickets taken in career
- BBI – Best bowling in an innings
- Ave – Average runs per wicket

Fielding

- Ca – Catches taken
- St – Stumpings affected

== List of players ==
Statistics are correct as of 29 August 2026.

Guernsey women T20I cricketers
General					Batting				Bowling				Fielding		Ref
No.	Name	First	Last	Mat	Runs	HS	Avg	50	Balls	Wkt	BBI	Ave	Ca	St	Ref
1	Francesca Bulpitt‡†	2019	2026	18	164	23	9.11	0	192	8	2/14	21.37	2	0	
2	Carrie Eddie†	2019	2019	1	–	–	–	–	–	–	–	–	0	0	
3	Katrina Guilbert	2019	2019	1	–	–	–	–	18	0	–	–	0	0	
4	Rebecca Hubbard	2019	2024	16	263	51*	26.30	1	176	6	1/4	30.00	2	0	
5	Claire Jennings	2019	2025	17	13	6	3.25	0	335	19	3/19	16.36	1	0	
6	Leigh Le Page	2019	2019	1	–	–	–	–	–	–	–	–	0	0	
7	Lucy Le Page	2019	2019	1	–	–	–	–	6	0	–	–	0	0	
8	Jeanette Savage	2019	2022	3	–	–	–	–	–	–	–	–	0	0	
9	Philippa Stahelin	2019	2026	17	157	56*	10.46	1	2	0	–	–	6	0	
10	Katie Watson	2019	2019	1	13	13	13.00	0	24	2	2/15	7.50	0	0	
11	Elizabeth Willcocks	2019	2023	5	15	9	3.75	0	–	–	–	–	0	0	
12	Emily Merrien	2022	2024	16	30	10	3.75	0	300	16	3/24	16.56	1	0	
13	Hannah Mechem‡	2022	2024	16	157	31	10.46	0	279	19	6/6	15.00	8	0	
14	Marianne Le Ray	2022	2025	4	3	1*	3.00	0	–	–	–	–	0	0	
15	Charlotte Milner	2022	2023	5	14	11	4.66	0	36	0	–	–	0	0	
16	Olivia Morgan	2022	2026	6	4	4*	–	–	66	3	256	42.00	0	0	
17	Molly Robinson	2022	2026	15	137	40*	19.57	0	270	15	4/15	17.86	4	0	
18	Alice Davis	2023	2024	7	9	6	2.25	0	54	2	1/17	51.00	0	0	
19	Krista De La Mare‡†	2023	2026	20	142	30*	10.14	0	–	–	–	–	11	8	
20	Elise Millington	2023	2026	15	69	26	7.66	0	199	5	1/9	43.60	2	0	
21	Rosie Davis	2023	2024	14	210	39*	17.50	0	12	0	–	–	6	0	
22	Eva Bourgaize	2023	2026	13	6	2*	1.50	0	120	5	2/16	35.20	2	0	
23	Annie Le Ray	2024	2026	12	44	13	6.28	0	238	11	2/13	20.54	0	0	
24	Hana Atkinson	2024	2026	7	46	26*	9.20	0	–	–	–	–	4	0	
25	Rachel Merrien	2024	2026	5	10	8	3.33	0	–	–	–	–	2	0	
26	Rosie Home	2025	2026	2	3	2*	3.00	0	18	0	–	–	0	0	
27	Katie Robert	2026	2026	5	63	35	15.75	0	90	9	3/31	10.33	1	0	
28	Mollie Watson	2026	2026	5	1	1	0.50	0	78	0	–	–	0	0	
29	Claire Elmore	2026	2026	3	0	0	0.00	0	30	4	2/12	6.25	0	0	

== See also ==
- List of Guernsey cricketers
