= France Cricket =

Sports governing body

- Sport: Cricket
- Founded: 1998
- Affiliation: International Cricket Council
- Regional affiliation: ICC Europe
- Location: Saint-Maurice, Val-de-Marne, France

Official website
- www.francecricket.com
- (France)

France Cricket is the official governing body of the sport of cricket in France. Its headquarters is currently based in Saint-Maurice, Val-de-Marne, France. France Cricket is France's representative at the International Cricket Council and is an associate member and has been a member of that body since 1998. It is also a member of the ICC Europe (earlier the European Cricket Council).

Most of the top level players in France are immigrants from India, Pakistan, Sri Lanka or the West Indies.

== History ==
There is documented evidence of cricket games played in France as early as 1864. By the end of the 19th century, there were about 12 club teams in France. France participated in the Olympic Games in Paris in 1900, the only Olympics that has included cricket, and won the silver medal (although many of the players on the French team were English expatriates).

In November 2023, France 24 reported that France Cricket had allegedly provided fabricated data to the International Cricket Council (ICC) in order to access additional funding. An investigation by France 24 found that France Cricket had reported results from "ghost matches" which did not actually take place, particularly between women's teams. Allegations were also made that the organisation had mismanaged funds, with former CEO Marjorie Guillaume stating that she had been refused access to the organisation's accounts and that she had been unable to verify over €100,000 in claimed expenditure on equipment.

== See also ==
- France national cricket team
- France women's national cricket team
- France national under-19 cricket team
