= Norway women's national cricket team =

Cricket team

Norway
- Flag of Norway
- Association: Norwegian Cricket Board

International Cricket Council
- ICC status: Associate member (2017); Affiliate member (2000)
- ICC region: Europe
ICC Rankings	Current	Best-ever
T20I	67th	50th (23 Dec 2022)

T20 Internationals
- First T20I: v. Austria at Parc du Grand Blottereau, Nantes; 31 July 2019
- Last T20I: v. Austria at Moara Vlasei Cricket Ground, Ilfov County; 30 August 2026
T20Is	Played	Won/Lost
Total	45	15/30 (0 ties, 0 no results)
This year	8	4/4 (0 ties, 0 no results)
T20I kit
- As of 30 August 2026

The Norway national women's cricket team represents Norway in international women's cricket. In April 2018, the International Cricket Council (ICC) granted full Women's Twenty20 International (WT20I) status to all its members. Therefore, all Twenty20 matches played between Norway women and other ICC members after 1 July 2018 have the full WT20I status.

The team played its first WT20I matches in the 2019 France Women's T20I Quadrangular Series, during July and August 2019, in Nantes.

== Records and statistics ==
International Match Summary — Norway Women

Last updated 30 August 2026

Playing Record
Format	M	W	L	T	NR	Inaugural Match
Twenty20 Internationals	45	15	30	0	0	31 July 2019

=== Twenty20 International ===
- Highest team total: 141/8 v Guernsey on 11 August 2024 at Ekeberg Cricket Ground 1, Oslo.
- Highest individual score: 54, Ayesha Hasan v Portugal on 9 April 2025 at Santarem Cricket Ground, Albergaria.
- Best individual bowling figures: 3/9, Farial Zia Safdar v Sweden on 29 August 2021 at Guttsta Wicked Cricket Ground, Kolsva.

T20I record versus other nations

Records complete to WT20I #2983. Last updated 30 August 2026.

Opponent	M	W	L	T	NR	First match	First win
ICC Associate members
Austria	5	2	3	0	0	31 July 2019	31 July 2019
Bulgaria	1	1	0	0	0	12 October 2025	12 October 2025
Czech Republic	2	0	2	0	0	27 June 2026	
Denmark	5	1	4	0	0	28 May 2022	28 May 2022
Estonia	2	2	0	0	0	26 August 2023	26 August 2023
Finland	1	1	0	0	0	30 August 2025	30 August 2025
France	2	0	2	0	0	31 July 2019	
Germany	1	0	1	0	0	30 August 2025	
Greece	1	1	0	0	0	29 August 2026	29 August 2026
Guernsey	1	0	1	0	0	11 August 2024	
Isle of Man	2	0	2	0	0	12 November 2022	
Italy	1	0	1	0	0	11 November 2022	
Jersey	2	0	2	0	0	1 August 2019	
Luxembourg	4	4	0	0	0	14 September 2024	14 September 2024
Portugal	3	1	2	0	0	7 April 2025	8 April 2025
Romania	2	1	1	0	0	11 October 2025	27 August 2026
Spain	1	0	1	0	0	13 November 2022	
Sweden	8	0	8	0	0	29 August 2021	
Turkey	1	1	0	0	0	11 October 2025	11 October 2025

== See also ==
- List of Norway women Twenty20 International cricketers
