= FB Playing Fields =

Multi-purpose stadium in Jersey, UK

- FB Fields
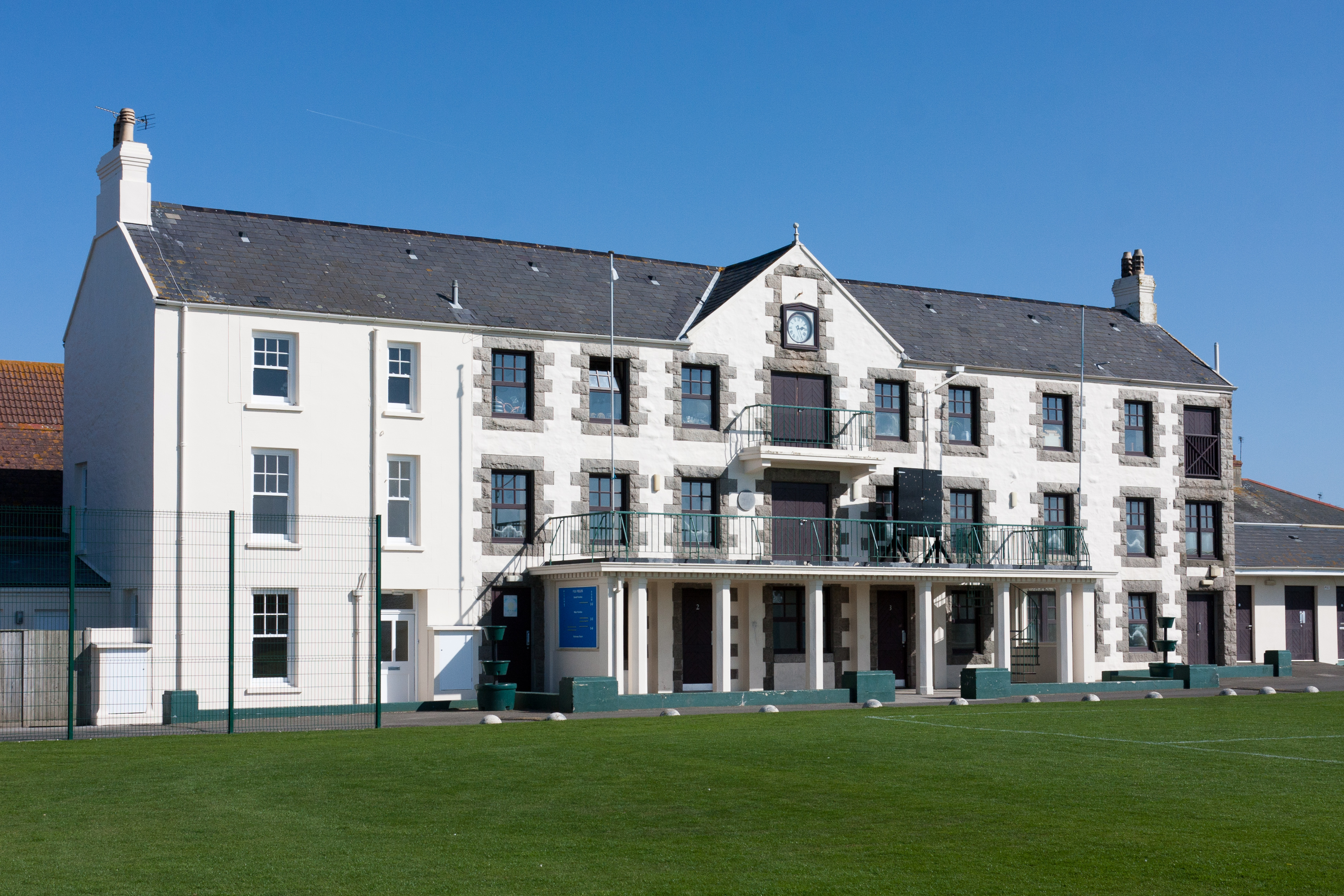
- The pavilion in 2012.
- Interactive map of FB Playing Fields
- Full name: FB Playing Fields
- Former names: FB Fields
- Location: St. Clement, Jersey
- Coordinates: 49.174083°N 2.083595°W
- Owner: States of Jersey
- Operator: Booking office: Fort Regent
- Scoreboard: Yes

Construction
- Opened: 1964

Tenant

Website
- FB playing fields

FB Playing Fields
- Interactive map of FB Playing Fields

Ground information

International information
- First women's T20I: 29 May 2023: Sweden v Turkey
- Last women's T20I: 2 June 2023: Jersey v Sweden
- As of 2 June 2023; Source: Cricinfo

FB Playing Fields or Florence Boot Fields is a multi-purpose stadium in the parish of St. Clement, Jersey. The grounds are named after benefactor Florence Boot (1863 - 1952) who was the Jersey-born wife of Jesse Boot, 1st Baron Trent.

== History ==
In 2010, Jersey cricketers won the ICC European Division one title at FB Fields. The venue hosted several events during the 2015 Island Games.

This is one of a number of facilities maintained by Education, Sport and Culture which provide a home to many of the island's sports clubs and associations. The 8-lane all weather athletics track has hosted a number of leading athletes and sportsmen both for training and competition purposes and was due to be upgraded to a Category A facility by the time of the 2015 Island Games.

Some of the jump areas will also be relocated to the outside of the track to comply with new IAAF regulations. The pavilion can be found close to the entrance of the site and houses changing facilities, toilets, a first aid room and an officials’ room. Upstairs there is a balcony and a canteen Jersey Aikido Club house the 2 top rooms where they teach traditional Aikido and run an Aiki-Fit class, they have trained at these facilities since 2002 and are the oldest Aikido Club in Jersey.

There is plenty of free parking just inside the entrance with additional parking adjacent to the Geoff Reed Table Tennis Centre.

== Facilities ==
The facilities include;

- a 400m athletics track
- Geoff Reed Table Tennis Centre
- 2 cricket pitches (during summer)
- 5 open cricket nets
- several football pitches (during winter)
- a grass hockey pitch
- a pavilion
- free car parking

== See also ==
- Springfield Stadium
