= Spain women's national cricket team =

Cricket team

Spain
- Flag of Spain
- Association: Cricket Spain

International Cricket Council
- ICC status: Associate member (2017); Affiliate member (1992)
- ICC region: Europe
ICC Rankings	Current	Best-ever
T20I	32nd	30th (30 Apr 2019)

T20 Internationals
- First T20I: v. Austria at Dreux Sport Cricket Club, Dreux; 5 May 2022
- Last T20I: v. Switzerland at Embrach Cricket Ground, Embrach; 30 July 2026
T20Is	Played	Won/Lost
Total	28	15/12 (0 ties, 1 no result)
This year	6	3/3 (0 ties, 0 no results)
T20I kit
- As of 31 July 2026

The Spain women's national cricket team represents Spain in international women's cricket matches.

In April 2018, the International Cricket Council (ICC) granted full Women's Twenty20 International (WT20I) status to all its members. Thus, all Twenty20 matches played between Espaniol women and other international sides after 1 July 2018 qualify as full WT20Is. The team played their first official WT20I matches during a quadrangular series in France in May 2022.

== Records and statistics ==
International Match Summary — Spain Women

Last updated 31 July 2026

Playing Record
Format	M	W	L	T	NR	Inaugural Match
Twenty20 Internationals	28	15	12	0	1	5 May 2022

=== Twenty20 International ===
- Highest team total: 167/3 v Croatia on 26 October 2024 at Mladost Cricket Ground, Zagreb.
- Highest individual score: 70*, Andrea Davidson-Soler v Croatia on 26 October 2024 at Mladost Cricket Ground, Zagreb.
- Best individual bowling figures: 5/6, Aliza Saleem v Croatia on 26 October 2024 at Mladost Cricket Ground, Zagreb.

T20I record versus other nations

Records complete to WT20I #2944. Last updated 31 July 2026.

Opponent	M	W	L	T	NR	First match	First win
ICC Associate members
Austria	2	0	2	0	0	5 May 2022	
Brazil	2	0	2	0	0	29 July 2026	
Croatia	4	4	0	0	0	26 October 2024	26 October 2024
France	1	0	1	0	0	8 May 2022	
Germany	1	0	1	0	0	25 May 2025	
Greece	5	4	0	0	1	20 September 2024	21 September 2024
Isle of Man	2	2	0	0	0	12 November 2022	12 November 2022
Italy	2	0	2	0	0	14 November 2022	
Jersey	3	0	3	0	0	6 May 2022	
Norway	1	1	0	0	0	13 November 2022	13 November 2022
Sweden	2	1	1	0	0	14 November 2022	14 November 2022
Switzerland	3	3	0	0	0	28 July 2026	28 July 2026

== Tournament history ==
=== ICC Women's World T20 ===
ICC Women's T20 World Cup records
Year	Round	Position	GP	W	L	T	NR
(England) 2009	Did not qualify						
(Cricket West Indies) 2010	Did not qualify						
(Sri Lanka) 2012	Did not qualify						
(Bangladesh) 2014	Did not qualify						
(India) 2016	Did not qualify						
(Cricket West Indies) 2018	Did not qualify						
(Australia) 2020	Did not qualify						
(South Africa) 2023	Did not qualify						
(United Arab Emirates) 2024	Did not qualify						
(England) 2026	Did not qualify						
Total	0/10	0 Titles	0	0	0	0	0

=== ICC Women's World Cup ===
ICC Women's Cricket World Cup records
Year	Round	Position	GP	W	L	T	NR
(England) 1973	Did not qualify/No women's ODI status						
(India) 1978	Did not qualify/No women's ODI status						
(New Zealand) 1982	Did not qualify/No women's ODI status						
(Australia) 1988	Did not qualify/No women's ODI status						
(England) 1993	Did not qualify/No women's ODI status						
(India) 1997	Did not qualify/No women's ODI status						
(New Zealand) 2000	Did not qualify/No women's ODI status						
(South Africa) 2005	Did not qualify/No women's ODI status						
(Australia) 2009	Did not qualify/No women's ODI status						
(India) 2013	Did not qualify/No women's ODI status						
(England) 2017	Did not qualify/No women's ODI status						
(New Zealand) 2022	Did not qualify/No women's ODI status						
(India) 2025	Did not qualify/No women's ODI status						
Total	0/12	0 Titles	0	0	0	0	0

=== ICC Women's T20 World Cup Europe Qualifier ===
ICC Women's T20 World Cup Europe Qualifier records
Year	Round	Position	GP	W	L	T	NR
(Spain) 2019	Did not participate						
(Spain) 2021	Did not participate						
(Jersey) (Spain) 2023	Did not participate						
(Italy) 2025	DNQ	–	5	1	4	0	0
Total	1/4	0 Title	5	1	4	0	0

=== Women's European Cricket Championship ===
Women's European Cricket Championship records
Year	Round	Position	GP	W	L	T	NR
(Denmark) 1989	Did not participate						
(England) 1990	Did not participate						
(Netherlands) 1991	Did not participate						
(Republic of Ireland) 1995	Did not participate						
(Denmark) 1999	Did not participate						
(England) 2001	Did not participate						
(Wales) 2005	Did not participate						
(Netherlands) 2007	Did not participate						
(Republic of Ireland) 2009	Did not participate						
(Scotland) 2010	Did not participate						
(Netherlands) 2011	Did not participate						
(England) 2014	Did not participate						
Total	0/12	0 Title	0	0	0	0	0

=== Cricket at Summer Olympics Games ===
Cricket at Summer Olympics records
Host Year	Round	Position	GP	W	L	T	NR
(United States) 2028	To be determined						
(Australia) 2032	To be determined						
Total	–	0 Title	0	0	0	0	0

=== ICC Women's T20 Champions Trophy ===
ICC Women's T20 Champions Trophy records
Host Year	Round	Position	GP	W	L	T	NR
(Sri Lanka) 2027	To be determined						
2031	To be determined						
Total	–	0 Title	0	0	0	0	0

== See also ==
- List of Spain women Twenty20 International cricketers
