= Jersey Cricket Board =

- Sport: Cricket
- Jurisdiction: Jersey
- Founded: 1870; 155 years ago
- Affiliation: International Cricket Council
- Affiliation date: 2005; 20 years ago
- Regional affiliation: ICC Europe
- Location: St. Helier
- Chairman: John Harris
- Secretary: Becky Walters
- Men's coach: (England) Paul Hutchison
- Women's coach: (Wales) Darren Thomas

Official website
- www.jerseycricket.je
- (Jersey)

Jersey Cricket Board is the official governing body of the sport of cricket in Jersey. Jersey Cricket Board is Jersey's representative at the International Cricket Council (ICC) and has been a member since 2005 and an associate member since 2007. It is also a member of the ICC Europe (earlier the European Cricket Council). The headquarters of Jersey Cricket Board are in St. Helier, Jersey. Its chairman is John Harris and chief executive is Sarah Gomersall.
