= College Field, Saint Peter Port =

Cricket ground in Guernsey

College Field
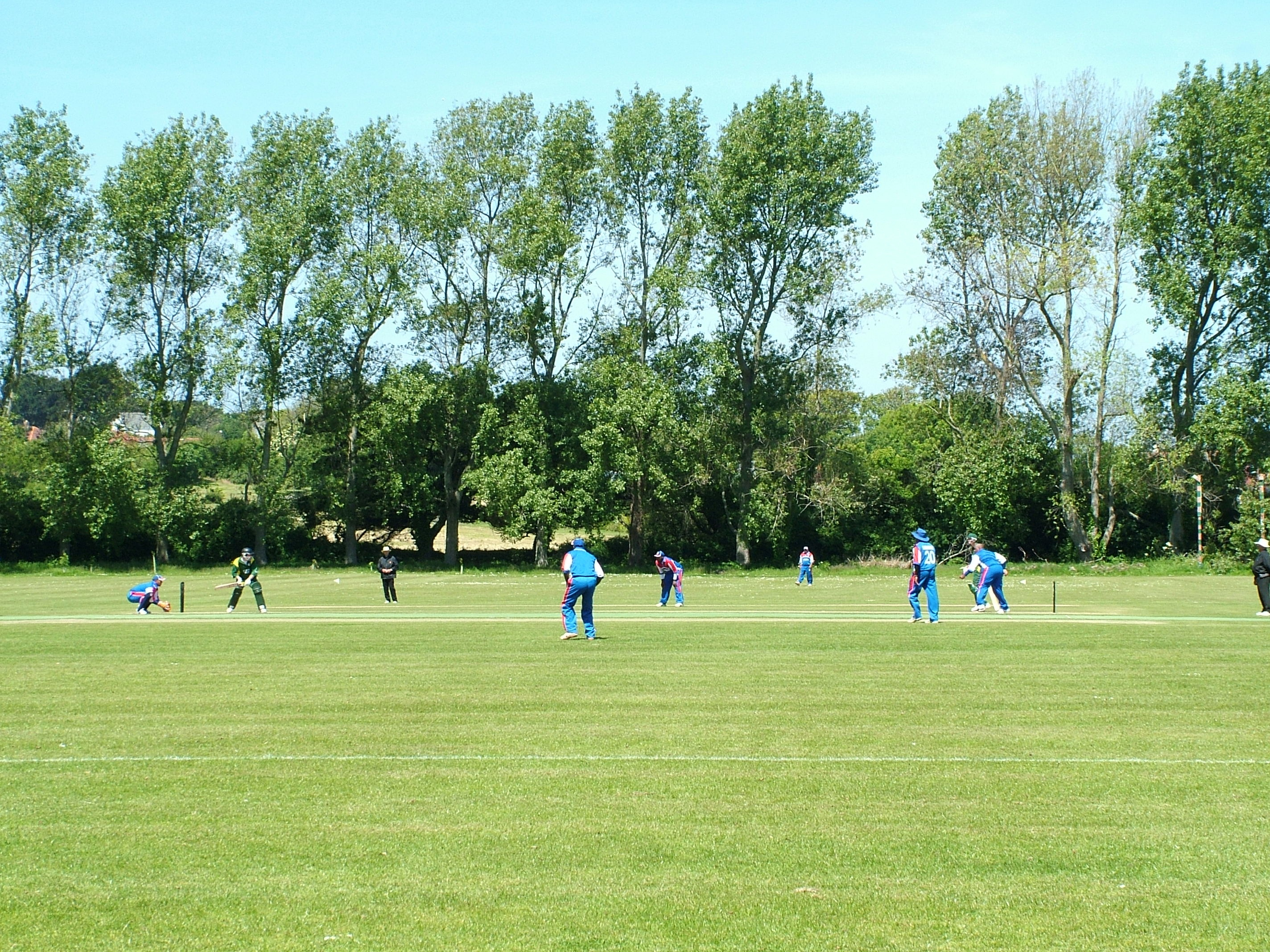

Ground information
- Location: Saint Peter Port, Guernsey

International information
- First T20I: 31 May 2019: Guernsey v Jersey
- Last T20I: 20 May 2022: Guernsey v Jersey
- First WT20I: 31 May 2019: Guernsey v Jersey
- As of 20 May 2022; Source: Cricinfo

College Field is a cricket ground in Saint Peter Port, Guernsey. The venue has hosted matches in the 2009 ICC World Cricket League Division Seven tournament, and in the Regional Finals of the 2018–19 ICC World Twenty20 Europe Qualifier tournament in June 2019.
