= Grainville Playing Fields =

Sports Grounds in Jersey, UK

- Interactive map of Grainville Playing Fields

Ground information
- Location: St Saviour, Jersey
- Country: Jersey
- Establishment: 1988 (first recorded cricket match)

International information
- First men's T20I: 6 June 2025: Jersey v Guernsey
- Last men's T20I: 7 June 2025: Jersey v Guernsey
- First women's ODI: 10 July 2002: England v India
- Last women's ODI: 11 July 2002: India v New Zealand
- First women's T20I: 25 June 2022: Jersey v Guernsey
- Last women's T20I: 14 June 2026: Jersey v Guernsey

Team information
Channel Islands	(2001–2002)
Jersey	(1988–present)
- As of 7 June 2025; Source: Cricket Archive

Grainville Playing Fields are sports grounds in St Saviour, Jersey, Channel Islands. Amenties include: cricket field, rugby pitch, bowling green, six tennis courts, pavilion, clubhouse and parking. Open to schools, clubs, associations, and the public. The rugby pitch is the home grounds of the Jersey Royals Rugby Football Club, and the cricket club is used by the Jersey Cricket Board and is also used as a venue for international competition matches.

In 1978, Queen Elizabeth II and Prince Philip, Duke of Edinburgh visited Grainville Playing Fields and met with some of the Island children as part of their Jersey tour and although it was school holidays over 5,000 children returned to their schools and attended.

== History ==
The first recorded match held on the cricket field came in 1988 when Jersey played the Hampshire Second XI. The grounds has since been the venue of a number of international tournaments, including matches in the 2008 World Cricket League Division Five which was won by Afghanistan, and the 2010 Division One European Cricket Championship, which Jersey won. The grounds have also hosted four matches for a combined Channel Islands team when it was permitted to take part in the English Minor Counties ECB 38-County Cup competition in 2001 and 2002.

The most notable matches held at the grounds came in 2002 when the England women's cricket team played a Women's One Day International tri-series against the New Zealand women's national cricket team and India women's national cricket team.
