= Sweden women's national cricket team =

Cricket team

Sweden
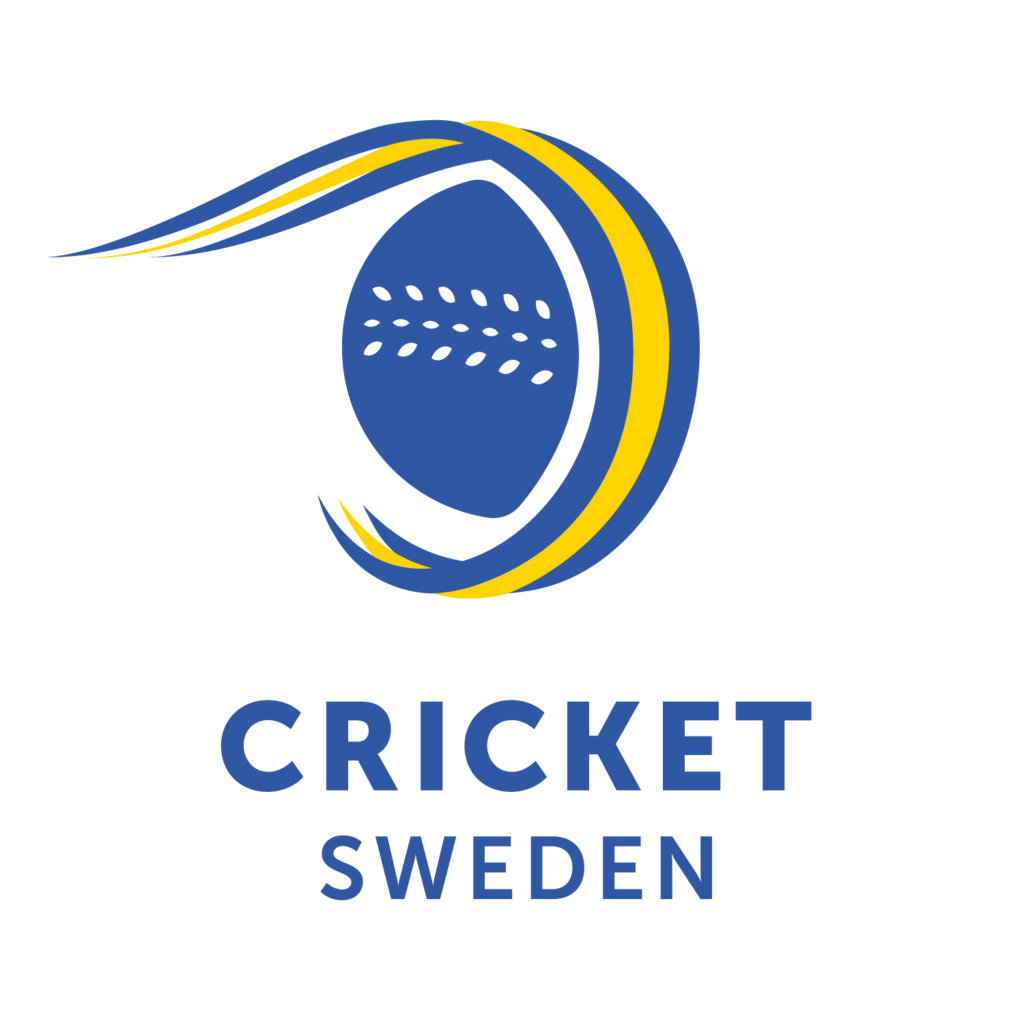
- Association: Swedish Cricket Federation

International Cricket Council
- ICC status: Associate member (2017); Affiliate member (1997)
- ICC region: Europe
ICC Rankings	Current	Best-ever
T20I	38th	27th (29 May 2022)

T20 Internationals
- First T20I: v. Norway at Guttsta Wicked Cricket Ground, Kolsva; 29 August 2021
- Last T20I: v. Austria at Moara Vlasei Cricket Ground, Ilfov County; 18 October 2026
T20Is	Played	Won/Lost
Total	41	27/13 (0 ties, 1 no result)
This year	7	6/0 (0 ties, 1 no result)
- As of 18 October 2026

The Sweden women's national cricket team represents Sweden in women's cricket matches.

In April 2018, the International Cricket Council (ICC) granted full Women's Twenty20 International (WT20I) status to all its members.

== History ==
Sweden women's team played its first WT20I match against Norway on 29 August 2021, winning by two wickets.

In 2023, it was announced Sweden would participate in the qualifying process for the ICC Women's T20 World Cup for the first time, by playing in the Europe Division Two qualifier in Jersey.

== Records and statistics ==
International Match Summary — Sweden Women

Last updated 18 October 2026

Playing Record
Format	M	W	L	T	NR	Inaugural Match
Twenty20 Internationals	41	27	13	0	1	29 August 2021

=== Twenty20 International ===
- Highest team total: 159/5 v. Denmark on 28 May 2022 at Guttsta Wicked Cricket Ground, Kolsva.
- Highest individual score: 51, Anya Vaidya v. Italy on 30 May 2023 at FB Playing Fields, St Clement.
- Best individual bowling figures: 5/7, Gunjan Shukla v. Isle of Man on 14 November 2022 at Desert Springs Cricket Ground, Almería.

T20I record versus other nations

Records complete to WT20I #3039. Last updated 18 October 2026.

Opponent	M	W	L	T	NR	First match	First win
ICC Associate members
Austria	2	2	0	0	0	15 October 2026	15 October 2026
Bulgaria	1	1	0	0	0	15 October 2026	15 October 2026
Denmark	6	6	0	0	0	28 May 2022	28 May 2022
Finland	1	1	0	0	0	31 August 2025	31 August 2025
France	1	0	1	0	0	30 May 2023	
Germany	5	1	3	0	1	1 June 2023	28 August 2026
Isle of Man	2	1	1	0	0	14 November 2022	14 November 2022
Italy	6	0	6	0	0	12 November 2022	
Jersey	2	1	1	0	0	2 June 2023	29 May 2025
Malta	3	3	0	0	0	26 September 2024	26 September 2024
Norway	8	8	0	0	0	29 August 2021	29 August 2021
Romania	1	1	0	0	0	17 October 2026	17 October 2026
Spain	2	1	1	0	0	14 November 2022	25 May 2025
Turkey	1	1	0	0	0	29 May 2023	29 May 2023

== Tournament history ==
=== ICC Women's World Cup ===
World Cup record
Year	Round	Position	GP	W	L	T	NR
(England) 1973	Did not qualify/No women's ODI status						
(India) 1978	Did not qualify/No women's ODI status						
(New Zealand) 1982	Did not qualify/No women's ODI status						
(Australia) 1988	Did not qualify/No women's ODI status						
(England) 1993	Did not qualify/No women's ODI status						
(India) 1997	Did not qualify/No women's ODI status						
(New Zealand) 2000	Did not qualify/No women's ODI status						
(South Africa) 2005	Did not qualify/No women's ODI status						
(Australia) 2009	Did not qualify/No women's ODI status						
(India) 2013	Did not qualify/No women's ODI status						
(England) 2017	Did not qualify/No women's ODI status						
(New Zealand) 2022	Did not qualify/No women's ODI status						
(India) 2025	Did not qualify/No women's ODI status						
Total	0/13	0 Titles	0	0	0	0	0

=== ICC Women's World T20 ===
Twenty20 World Cup Record
Year	Round	Position	GP	W	L	T	NR
(England) 2009	Did not qualify						
(Cricket West Indies) 2010	Did not qualify						
(Sri Lanka) 2012	Did not qualify						
(Bangladesh) 2014	Did not qualify						
(India) 2016	Did not qualify						
(Cricket West Indies) 2018	Did not qualify						
(Australia) 2020	Did not qualify						
(South Africa) 2023	Did not qualify						
(United Arab Emirates) 2024	Did not qualify						
(England) 2026	Did not qualify						
Total	0/9	0 Titles	0	0	0	0	0

=== ICC Women's World Twenty20 Europe Qualifier ===
ICC Women's Twenty20 Qualifier Europe records
Year	Round	Position	GP	W	L	T	NR
(Spain) 2019	Did not participate						
(Spain) 2021	Did not participate						
(Jersey) 2023	Did not participate						
(Italy) 2025	DNQ	–	5	2	3	0	0
Total	1/4	0 Title	5	2	3	0	0

=== Women's European Cricket Championship ===
Women's European Cricket Championship records
Year	Round	Position	GP	W	L	T	NR
(Denmark) 1989	Did not participate						
(England) 1990	Did not participate						
(Netherlands) 1991	Did not participate						
(Republic of Ireland) 1995	Did not participate						
(Denmark) 1999	Did not participate						
(England) 2001	Did not participate						
(Wales) 2005	Did not participate						
(Netherlands) 2007	Did not participate						
(Republic of Ireland) 2009	Did not participate						
(Scotland) 2010	Did not participate						
(Netherlands) 2011	Did not participate						
(England) 2014	Did not participate						
Total	0/12	0 Title	0	0	0	0	0

=== Cricket at Summer Olympics Games ===
Cricket at Summer Olympics records
Host Year	Round	Position	GP	W	L	T	NR
(United States) 2028	To be determined						
(Australia) 2032	To be determined						
Total	–	0 Title	0	0	0	0	0

=== ICC Women's T20 Champions Trophy ===
ICC Women's T20 Champions Trophy records
Host Year	Round	Position	GP	W	L	T	NR
(Sri Lanka) 2027	To be determined						
2031	To be determined						
Total	–	0 Title	0	0	0	0	0

== See also ==
- List of Sweden women Twenty20 International cricketers
