= Austria women's national cricket team =

Cricket team

Austria
- Austrian Cricket Association logo
- Association: Austrian Cricket Association

Personnel
- Captain: Jo-Antoinette Stiglitz
- Coach: Quinton Norris (2020)

International Cricket Council
- ICC status: Associate member (2017); Affiliate member (1992)
- ICC region: Europe
ICC Rankings	Current	Best-ever
T20I	54th	42nd (2 May 2022)

T20 Internationals
- First T20I: v. Norway at Parc du Grand Blottereau, Nantes; 31 July 2019
- Last T20I: v. Sweden at Moara Vlasei Cricket Ground, Ilfov County; 18 October 2026
T20Is	Played	Won/Lost
Total	69	30/39 (0 ties, 0 no results)
This year	8	5/3 (0 ties, 0 no results)
- As of 18 October 2026

The Austria national women's cricket team represents Austria in international women's cricket. In April 2018, the International Cricket Council (ICC) granted full Women's Twenty20 International (WT20I) status to all its members. Therefore, all Twenty20 matches played between Austria women and other ICC members since 1 July 2018 have been the full WT20I status.

The team played its first WT20I matches at the 2019 France Women's T20I Quadrangular Series, in July and August 2019, in Nantes.

== Squad ==
This lists all the players who played for Austria in the past 12 months or were named in the most recent squad.

Name	Age	Batting style	Bowling style	Notes
Batters
Priya Sabu	28	Right-handed	Right-arm medium	
Harjivan Bhullar	26	Right-handed	Right-arm leg spin	
Hannah Simpson-Parker	27	Right-handed	Right-arm medium	
Pravitha Ganeshan	18	Right-handed	Right-arm medium	
Prabhavathi Talloji				
Wicket-keepers
Anisha Nookala	25	Right-handed		
Emma Kirkman	39	Right-handed		
All-rounders
Jo-Antoinette Stiglitz	38	Right-handed	Right-arm off spin	Captain
Sheetal Bhardwaj	27	Right-handed	Right-arm medium	
Mallika Pushpangani	46	Right-handed	Right-arm medium	
Andrea-Mae Zepeda	30	Right-handed	Right-arm medium	
Bowlers
Sriya Komati Reddy	22	Right-handed	Right-arm medium	
Valentina Avdylaj	23	Right-handed	Right-arm medium	
Ashmaan Saifee	20	Right-handed	Right-arm medium	
Vera Poglitsch				

Updated as on 15 Sep 2024

== Records and statistics ==
International Match Summary — Austria Women

Last updated 18 October 2026

Playing Record
Format	M	W	L	T	NR	Inaugural Match
Twenty20 Internationals	69	30	39	0	0	31 July 2019

=== Twenty20 International ===
- Highest team total: 212/4 v Belgium on 25 September 2021 at Seebarn Cricket Ground, Austria.
- Highest individual score: 101, Andrea-Mae Zepeda v Belgium on 25 September 2021 at Seebarn Cricket Ground, Austria.
- Best individual bowling figures: 5/16, Mallika Pathirannehelage v Spain on 5 May 2022 at Dreux Sport Cricket Club, Dreux, France.

T20I record versus other nations

Records complete to WT20I #3039. Last updated 18 October 2026.

Opponent	M	W	L	T	NR	First match	First win
ICC Associate members
Belgium	3	3	0	0	0	25 September 2021	25 September 2021
Bulgaria	2	2	0	0	0	11 October 2025	11 October 2025
Czech Republic	6	6	0	0	0	8 June 2024	8 June 2024
Denmark	5	2	3	0	0	4 May 2024	4 May 2024
France	8	0	8	0	0	1 August 2019	
Germany	5	0	5	0	0	12 August 2020	
Gibraltar	2	2	0	0	0	11 June 2025	11 June 2025
Guernsey	5	2	3	0	0	27 August 2023	28 August 2023
Isle of Man	3	0	3	0	0	30 July 2023	
Italy	10	3	7	0	0	9 August 2021	10 August 2021
Jersey	3	1	2	0	0	1 August 2019	1 August 2019
Luxembourg	3	2	1	0	0	14 September 2024	14 September 2024
Norway	5	3	2	0	0	31 July 2019	2 August 2019
Romania	2	1	1	0	0	9 October 2025	17 October 2026
Spain	2	2	0	0	0	5 May 2022	5 May 2022
Sweden	2	0	2	0	0	15 October 2026	
Switzerland	1	0	1	0	0	13 September 2025	
Turkey	2	1	1	0	0	10 October 2025	10 October 2025

== See also ==
- Austria national cricket team
- List of Austria women Twenty20 International cricketers
