= France women's national cricket team =

Cricket team

France
- Association: Association France Cricket

Personnel
- Captain: Emmanuelle Brélivet

International Cricket Council
- ICC status: Associate member (1998); Affiliate member (1987)
- ICC region: Europe
| ICC Rankings | Current | Best-ever |
| T20I | 53rd | 30th (2 Oct 2020) |

T20 Internationals
- First T20I: Jersey at Parc du Grand Blottereau, Nantes; 31 July 2019
- Last T20I: Fiji at N'Du Stadium, Nouméa; 14 March 2025
| T20Is | Played | Won/Lost |
| Total | 39 | 16/22 (1 tie, 0 no results) |
| This year | 0 | 0/0 (0 ties, 0 no results) |
- As of 2 February 2026

The France women's national cricket team is the team that represents the country of France in international women's cricket matches. They became an associate member of the International Cricket Council (ICC) in 1998, having previously been an affiliate member since 1987.

In April 2018, the ICC granted full Women's Twenty20 International (WT20I) status to all its members. Therefore, all Twenty20 matches played between France women and another international side after 1 July 2018 were a full WT20I.

In December 2020, the ICC announced the qualification pathway for the 2023 ICC Women's T20 World Cup. The France women's team made their debut at an ICC women's event when they played in the 2021 ICC Women's T20 World Cup Europe Qualifier group.

== History ==
In May 2011, "Coupe de France Féminine" was established as part of a continuing commitment to the women's game in France. The first ever representative France women's team, les "Dames de France" played against Jersey Ladies (2011, Saumur and 2013, Jersey). Creation of an Indoor Women's National Championship is the newest development, involving four teams over four tournaments in 2013.

Older women too play in some clubs alongside their male counterparts, but efforts are now being specifically directed to involving women of all ages in the sport as part of the high priority being given to the development of women's cricket.

=== Fraud allegations and squad disbandment ===
In November 2023, France 24 reported that the Association France Cricket had allegedly overexaggerated the popularity of women's cricket to access additional funding from the ICC, including by reporting results from "ghost matches" which did not actually take place. It was also reported that France may have failed the eligibility criteria for the 2023 ICC Women's T20 World Cup Europe Qualifier, which required a minimum of eight domestic women's teams playing at least five hard-ball matches each year. An ICC spokesperson stated that "France's entry into the 2023 Women's T20 World Cup Qualifiers was determined by domestic activities that took place in 2021 and 2022 and pre-Covid", but that "members are also obliged to confirm to us that the information they provide to us is true and accurate". In response, the Nantes Cricket Club reportedly "sent a request to state prosecutors and police asking for an investigation into alleged fraudulent activity by the association".

Following the publication of the allegations by France 24, seventeen members of the French women's national squad signed an open letter calling for an official investigation into France Cricket's conduct. According to national team player Alix Brodin, some of the signatories to the letter received pressure from France Cricket not to proceed with publication. On 16 November 2023, France Cricket's sporting director Saravana Durairaj informed Tara Britton that she and her teammates would be suspended for breaching the organisation's code of conduct, which banned public criticism of the organisation. The French national team was subsequently withdrawn from the inaugural T10 Women's European Cricket Championship in December 2023. Players were asked to return their uniforms and were reportedly informed by France Cricket that they could only return to national selection if they apologised for the letter.

In April 2024, France 24 published further allegations of misconduct, documenting that three matches in division two of the women's national league supposedly held in April 2023 did not take place. It was additionally reported that, following the disbandment of the existing women's squad, that France had sought to incorporate members of the New Caledonia women's national cricket team into its national squad in order to meet eligibility requirements for the 2025 Women's Cricket World Cup qualification process.

== Tournament history ==
=== ICC Women's World Twenty20 Europe Qualifier ===
ICC Women's T20 World Cup Europe Qualifier records
| Year | Round | Position | GP | W | L | T | NR |
|---|---|---|---|---|---|---|---|
| (Spain) 2019 | Did not participate | | | | | | |
| (Spain) 2021 | Did not qualify | 5/5 | 4 | 0 | 4 | 0 | 0 |
| (Spain) 2023 | Did not qualify | 4/4 | 6 | 0 | 6 | 0 | 0 |
| Total | 2/2 | – | 10 | 0 | 10 | 0 | 0 |

=== ICC Women's World Twenty20 Europe Qualifier Division Two ===
ICC Women's T20 World Cup Europe Qualifier records
| Year | Round | Position | GP | W | L | T | NR |
|---|---|---|---|---|---|---|---|
| (Jersey) 2023 | Round robin | 1/6 | 5 | 4 | 1 | 0 | 0 |
| Total | 1/1 | – | 5 | 4 | 1 | 0 | 0 |

== Current squad ==
This lists all the players who were named in the 2023 ICC Women's T20 World Cup Europe Qualifier squad.

| Name | Age | Batting style | Bowling style | Notes |
Batters
| Ines McKeon | 19 | Right-handed | Right-arm off break | |
| Lydie Wykes-Templeman | 21 | Right-handed | Right-arm medium | |
| Ganesh Pooja | 39 | Right-handed | Right-arm off break | |
All-rounders
| Marie Violleau | 28 | Right-handed | Right-arm leg break | Captain |
| Amy Seddon | 19 | Right-handed | Right-arm medium | |
| Poppy McGeown | 34 | Right-handed | Right-arm medium | |
Wicket-keepers
| Tara Britton | 34 | Right-handed | | |
| Maëlle Cargouët | 51 | Right-handed | | |
Spin Bowler
| Prabhashi Mahawattage | 31 | Right-handed | Right-arm off break | |
Pace Bowlers
| Anika Bester | 31 | Right-handed | Right-arm medium | |
| Emma Patel | 19 | Right-handed | Right-arm medium | |
| Thea Graham | 35 | Right-handed | Right-arm medium | |
| Blandine Verdon | 26 | Left-handed | Right-arm medium | |
| Magali Marchello-Nizia | 42 | Right-handed | Right-arm medium | |

Updated on 12 Sep 2023.

== Records and statistics ==
International Match Summary — France Women

Last updated 14 March 2025

Playing Record
| Format | M | W | L | T | NR | Inaugural Match |
| Twenty20 Internationals | 39 | 16 | 22 | 1 | 0 | 31 July 2019 |

=== Twenty20 International ===
- Highest team total: 169/4 v. Turkey on 1 June 2023 at FB Playing Fields, St Clement.
- Highest individual score: 94, Ines McKeon v. Sweden on 30 May 2023 at FB Playing Fields, St Clement.
- Best individual bowling figures: 5/14, Emmanuelle Brelivet v. Austria on 1 August 2019 at Parc du Grand Blottereau, Nantes.

T20I record versus other nations

Records complete to WT20I #2206. Last updated 14 March 2025.

| Opponent | M | W | L | T | NR | First match | First win |
|---|---|---|---|---|---|---|---|
ICC Full members
| Ireland | 1 | 0 | 1 | 0 | 0 | 29 August 2021 | |
ICC Associate members
| Austria | 8 | 8 | 0 | 0 | 0 | 1 August 2019 | 1 August 2019 |
| Fiji | 2 | 0 | 1 | 1 | 0 | 13 March 2025 | |
| Germany | 7 | 1 | 6 | 0 | 0 | 8 July 2021 | 2 June 2023 |
| Italy | 3 | 0 | 3 | 0 | 0 | 29 May 2023 | |
| Jersey | 5 | 2 | 3 | 0 | 0 | 31 July 2019 | 31 July 2019 |
| Netherlands | 3 | 0 | 3 | 0 | 0 | 26 August 2021 | |
| Norway | 2 | 2 | 0 | 0 | 0 | 31 July 2019 | 31 July 2019 |
| Samoa | 1 | 0 | 1 | 0 | 0 | 12 March 2025 | |
| Scotland | 3 | 0 | 3 | 0 | 0 | 30 August 2021 | |
| Spain | 1 | 1 | 0 | 0 | 0 | 8 May 2022 | 8 May 2022 |
| Sweden | 1 | 1 | 0 | 0 | 0 | 30 May 2023 | 30 May 2023 |
| Turkey | 1 | 1 | 0 | 0 | 0 | 1 June 2023 | 1 June 2023 |
| Vanuatu | 1 | 0 | 1 | 0 | 0 | 11 March 2025 | |

== See also ==
- List of France women Twenty20 International cricketers
