= Guernsey women's cricket team =

Sports team

Guernsey
- Association: Guernsey Cricket Board

Personnel
- Captain: Krista De La Mare
- Coach: Ben Ferbrache

International Cricket Council
- ICC status: Associate member (2008); Affiliate member (2005)
- ICC region: Europe
ICC Rankings	Current	Best-ever
T20I	45th	38th (16 May 2024)

T20 Internationals
- First T20I: Jersey at College Field, Saint Peter Port; 31 May 2019
- Last T20I: Czech Republic at Moara Vlasei Cricket Ground, Ilfov County; 29 August 2026
T20Is	Played	Won/Lost
Total	23	10/13 (0 ties, 0 no results)
This year	5	1/4 (0 ties, 0 no results)
- As of 29 August 2026

The Guernsey women's cricket team represents Guernsey, a Crown dependency, in international women's cricket matches. Guernsey became an affiliate member in 2005 and an associate member of the International Cricket Council (ICC) in 2008.

== History ==
In April 2018, the ICC granted full Women's Twenty20 International (WT20I) status to all its members. Therefore, all Twenty20 matches played between Guernsey women and another international side after 1 July 2018 were eligible for full WT20I status.

Guernsey played their first WT20I on 31 May 2019, defeating neighbours Jersey by seven wickets in the 2019 T20 Inter-Insular Cup at College Field, Saint Peter Port. During the match opening batter Philippa Stahelin scored the first WT20I half-century by a Guernsey player with 56 not out from 52 balls.

On 5 May 2024, Hannah Mechem (Note: Hannah Mechem is incorrectly referred to as Hannah Eulenkamp by ESPNcricinfo in its scorecard for this match.) became the first Guernsey bowler to take a five-wicket haul in a WT20I when she bagged 6/6 against the Isle of Man in the second game of a three-match bilateral series held at the Norman Edwards Memorial Ground, Winchester, England.

In August 2024, Guernsey won three out of four matches to finish as runners-up in the 2024 Women's Nordic Cup with victories over Estonia, hosts Norway and a Finland XI while their solitary defeat came in their opening contest against eventual tournament champions Denmark by just five runs.

== Records and statistics ==
International Match Summary — Guernsey Women

Last updated 29 August 2026

Playing Record
Format	M	W	L	T	NR	Inaugural Match
Twenty20 Internationals	23	10	13	0	0	31 May 2019

=== Twenty20 International ===
- Highest team total: 142/3 (17.2 overs) v Norway on 11 August 2024 at Ekeberg Cricket Ground 1, Oslo.
- Highest individual score: 52*, Philippa Stahelin v Jersey on 31 May 2019 at College Field, Saint Peter Port.
- Best individual bowling figures: 6/6, Hannah Mechem v Isle of Man on 5 May 2024 at Norman Edwards Memorial Ground, Winchester.

T20I record versus other nations

Records complete to WT20I #2979. Last updated 29 August 2026.

Opponent	M	W	L	T	NR	First match	First win
ICC Associate members
Austria	5	3	2	0	0	27 August 2023	27 August 2023
Czech Republic	1	1	0	0	0	29 August 2026	29 August 2026
Denmark	1	0	1	0	0	10 August 2024	
Estonia	1	1	0	0	0	10 August 2024	10 August 2024
Isle of Man	3	3	0	0	0	5 May 2024	5 May 2024
Jersey	10	1	9	0	0	31 May 2019	31 May 2019
Norway	1	1	0	0	0	11 August 2024	11 August 2024
Turkey	1	0	1	0	0	28 August 2026	

== See also ==
- Guernsey cricket team
- List of Guernsey cricketers
- List of Guernsey women Twenty20 International cricketers
