= Lists of Twenty20 International cricketers =

Lists of Twenty20 International cricketers are the lists of Twenty20 International cricket players by team.

== By team ==
- List of Afghanistan Twenty20 International cricketers
- List of Argentina Twenty20 International cricketers
- List of Australia Twenty20 International cricketers
- List of Austria Twenty20 International cricketers
- List of Bahamas Twenty20 International cricketers
- List of Bahrain Twenty20 International cricketers
- List of Bangladesh Twenty20 International cricketers
- List of Belgium Twenty20 International cricketers
- List of Belize Twenty20 International cricketers
- List of Bermuda Twenty20 International cricketers
- List of Bhutan Twenty20 International cricketers
- List of Botswana Twenty20 International cricketers
- List of Brazil Twenty20 International cricketers
- List of Bulgaria Twenty20 International cricketers
- List of Cambodia Twenty20 International cricketers
- List of Cameroon Twenty20 International cricketers
- List of Canada Twenty20 International cricketers
- List of Cayman Islands Twenty20 International cricketers
- List of Chile Twenty20 International cricketers
- List of China Twenty20 International cricketers
- List of Cook Islands Twenty20 International cricketers
- List of Costa Rica Twenty20 International cricketers
- List of Croatia Twenty20 International cricketers
- List of Cyprus Twenty20 International cricketers
- List of Czech Republic Twenty20 International cricketers
- List of Denmark Twenty20 International cricketers
- List of England Twenty20 International cricketers
- List of Estonia Twenty20 International cricketers
- List of Eswatini Twenty20 International cricketers
- List of Falkland Islands Twenty20 International cricketers
- List of Fiji Twenty20 International cricketers
- List of Finland Twenty20 International cricketers
- List of France Twenty20 International cricketers
- List of Gambia Twenty20 International cricketers
- List of Germany Twenty20 International cricketers
- List of Ghana Twenty20 International cricketers
- List of Gibraltar Twenty20 International cricketers
- List of Greece Twenty20 International cricketers
- List of Guernsey Twenty20 International cricketers
- List of Hong Kong Twenty20 International cricketers
- List of Hungary Twenty20 International cricketers
- List of India Twenty20 International cricketers
- List of Indonesia Twenty20 International cricketers
- List of Iran Twenty20 International cricketers
- List of Ireland Twenty20 International cricketers
- List of Isle of Man Twenty20 International cricketers
- List of Israel Twenty20 International cricketers
- List of Italy Twenty20 International cricketers
- List of Ivory Coast Twenty20 International cricketers
- List of Japan Twenty20 International cricketers
- List of Jersey Twenty20 International cricketers
- List of Kenya Twenty20 International cricketers
- List of Kuwait Twenty20 International cricketers
- List of Lesotho Twenty20 International cricketers
- List of Luxembourg Twenty20 International cricketers
- List of Malawi Twenty20 International cricketers
- List of Malaysia Twenty20 International cricketers
- List of Maldives Twenty20 International cricketers
- List of Mali Twenty20 International cricketers
- List of Malta Twenty20 International cricketers
- List of Mexico Twenty20 International cricketers
- List of Mongolia Twenty20 International cricketers
- List of Mozambique Twenty20 International cricketers
- List of Myanmar Twenty20 International cricketers
- List of Namibia Twenty20 International cricketers
- List of Nepal Twenty20 International cricketers
- List of Netherlands Twenty20 International cricketers
- List of New Zealand Twenty20 International cricketers
- List of Nigeria Twenty20 International cricketers
- List of Norway Twenty20 International cricketers
- List of Oman Twenty20 International cricketers
- List of Pakistan Twenty20 International cricketers
- List of Panama Twenty20 International cricketers
- List of Papua New Guinea Twenty20 International cricketers
- List of Peru Twenty20 International cricketers
- List of Philippines Twenty20 International cricketers
- List of Portugal Twenty20 International cricketers
- List of Qatar Twenty20 International cricketers
- List of Romania Twenty20 International cricketers
- List of Rwanda Twenty20 International cricketers
- List of Saint Helena Twenty20 International cricketers
- List of Samoa Twenty20 International cricketers
- List of Saudi Arabia Twenty20 International cricketers
- List of Scotland Twenty20 International cricketers
- List of Serbia Twenty20 International cricketers
- List of Seychelles Twenty20 International cricketers
- List of Sierra Leone Twenty20 International cricketers
- List of Singapore Twenty20 International cricketers
- List of Slovenia Twenty20 International cricketers
- List of South Africa Twenty20 International cricketers
- List of South Korea Twenty20 International cricketers
- List of Spain Twenty20 International cricketers
- List of Sri Lanka Twenty20 International cricketers
- List of Suriname Twenty20 International cricketers
- List of Sweden Twenty20 International cricketers
- List of Switzerland Twenty20 International cricketers
- List of Tanzania Twenty20 International cricketers
- List of Thailand Twenty20 International cricketers
- List of Timor-Leste Twenty20 International cricketers
- List of Turkey Twenty20 International cricketers
- List of Turks and Caicos Islands Twenty20 International cricketers
- List of Uganda Twenty20 International cricketers
- List of United Arab Emirates Twenty20 International cricketers
- List of United States Twenty20 International cricketers
- List of Uzbekistan Twenty20 International cricketers
- List of Vanuatu Twenty20 International cricketers
- List of West Indies Twenty20 International cricketers
- List of World XI Twenty20 International cricketers
- List of Zambia Twenty20 International cricketers
- List of Zimbabwe Twenty20 International cricketers

== Women ==
- List of Argentina women Twenty20 International cricketers
- List of Australia women Twenty20 International cricketers
- List of Austria women Twenty20 International cricketers
- List of Bangladesh women Twenty20 International cricketers
- List of Bahrain women Twenty20 International cricketers
- List of Barbados women Twenty20 International cricketers
- List of Belgium women Twenty20 International cricketers
- List of Belize women Twenty20 International cricketers
- List of Bhutan women Twenty20 International cricketers
- List of Botswana women Twenty20 International cricketers
- List of Brazil women Twenty20 International cricketers
- List of Bulgaria women Twenty20 International cricketers
- List of Cambodia women Twenty20 International cricketers
- List of Cameroon women Twenty20 International cricketers
- List of Canada women Twenty20 International cricketers
- List of Cayman Islands women Twenty20 International cricketers
- List of Chile women Twenty20 International cricketers
- List of China women Twenty20 International cricketers
- List of Cook Islands women Twenty20 International cricketers
- List of Costa Rica women Twenty20 International cricketers
- List of Croatia women Twenty20 International cricketers
- List of Cyprus women Twenty20 International cricketers
- List of Czech Republic women Twenty20 International cricketers
- List of Denmark women Twenty20 International cricketers
- List of England women Twenty20 International cricketers
- List of Estonia women Twenty20 International cricketers
- List of Eswatini women Twenty20 International cricketers
- List of Fiji women Twenty20 International cricketers
- List of Finland women Twenty20 International cricketers
- List of France women Twenty20 International cricketers
- List of Gambia women Twenty20 International cricketers
- List of Germany women Twenty20 International cricketers
- List of Ghana women Twenty20 International cricketers
- List of Gibraltar women Twenty20 International cricketers
- List of Greece women Twenty20 International cricketers
- List of Guernsey women Twenty20 International cricketers
- List of Hong Kong women Twenty20 International cricketers
- List of India women Twenty20 International cricketers
- List of Indonesia women Twenty20 International cricketers
- List of Ireland women Twenty20 International cricketers
- List of Isle of Man women Twenty20 International cricketers
- List of Italy women Twenty20 International cricketers
- List of Japan women Twenty20 International cricketers
- List of Jersey women Twenty20 International cricketers
- List of Kenya women Twenty20 International cricketers
- List of Kuwait women Twenty20 International cricketers
- List of Lesotho women Twenty20 International cricketers
- List of Luxembourg women Twenty20 International cricketers
- List of Malawi women Twenty20 International cricketers
- List of Malaysia women Twenty20 International cricketers
- List of Maldives women Twenty20 International cricketers
- List of Mali women Twenty20 International cricketers
- List of Malta women Twenty20 International cricketers
- List of Mexico women Twenty20 International cricketers
- List of Mongolia women Twenty20 International cricketers
- List of Mozambique women Twenty20 International cricketers
- List of Myanmar women Twenty20 International cricketers
- List of Namibia women Twenty20 International cricketers
- List of Nepal women Twenty20 International cricketers
- List of Netherlands women Twenty20 International cricketers
- List of New Zealand women Twenty20 International cricketers
- List of Nigeria women Twenty20 International cricketers
- List of Norway women Twenty20 International cricketers
- List of Oman women Twenty20 International cricketers
- List of Pakistan women Twenty20 International cricketers
- List of Papua New Guinea women Twenty20 International cricketers
- List of Peru women Twenty20 International cricketers
- List of Philippines women Twenty20 International cricketers
- List of Portugal women Twenty20 International cricketers
- List of Qatar women Twenty20 International cricketers
- List of Romania women Twenty20 International cricketers
- List of Rwanda women Twenty20 International cricketers
- List of Samoa women Twenty20 International cricketers
- List of Saudi Arabia women Twenty20 International cricketers
- List of Scotland women Twenty20 International cricketers
- List of Serbia women Twenty20 International cricketers
- List of Sierra Leone women Twenty20 International cricketers
- List of Singapore women Twenty20 International cricketers
- List of South Africa women Twenty20 International cricketers
- List of South Korea women Twenty20 International cricketers
- List of Spain women Twenty20 International cricketers
- List of Sri Lanka women Twenty20 International cricketers
- List of Sweden women Twenty20 International cricketers
- List of Switzerland women Twenty20 International cricketers
- List of Tanzania women Twenty20 International cricketers
- List of Thailand women Twenty20 International cricketers
- List of Turkey Twenty20 International cricketers
- List of Uganda women Twenty20 International cricketers
- List of United Arab Emirates women Twenty20 International cricketers
- List of United States women Twenty20 International cricketers
- List of Vanuatu women Twenty20 International cricketers
- List of West Indies women Twenty20 International cricketers
- List of Zambia women Twenty20 International cricketers
- List of Zimbabwe women Twenty20 International cricketers

== See also ==
- Lists of Test cricketers
- Lists of One Day International cricketers
