= Lists of One Day International cricketers =

Lists of One Day International cricketers are lists of One Day International cricket players by team.

== By team ==
- List of Afghanistan ODI cricketers
- List of African XI ODI cricketers
- List of Asian XI ODI cricketers
- List of Australia ODI cricketers
- List of Bangladesh ODI cricketers
- List of Bermuda ODI cricketers
- List of Canada ODI cricketers
- List of East Africa ODI cricketers
- List of England ODI cricketers
- List of Hong Kong ODI cricketers
- List of India ODI cricketers
- List of Ireland ODI cricketers
- List of Jersey ODI cricketers
- List of Kenya ODI cricketers
- List of Namibia ODI cricketers
- List of Nepal ODI cricketers
- List of Netherlands ODI cricketers
- List of New Zealand ODI cricketers
- List of Oman ODI cricketers
- List of Pakistan ODI cricketers
- List of Papua New Guinea ODI cricketers
- List of Scotland ODI cricketers
- List of South Africa ODI cricketers
- List of Sri Lanka ODI cricketers
- List of United Arab Emirates ODI cricketers
- List of United States ODI cricketers
- List of West Indies ODI cricketers
- List of World XI ODI cricketers
- List of Zimbabwe ODI cricketers

== Women ==
- List of Australia women ODI cricketers
- List of Bangladesh women ODI cricketers
- List of Denmark women ODI cricketers
- List of England women ODI cricketers
- List of India women ODI cricketers
- List of International XI women ODI cricketers
- List of Ireland women ODI cricketers
- List of Jamaica women ODI cricketers
- List of Japan women ODI cricketers
- List of Netherlands women ODI cricketers
- List of New Zealand women ODI cricketers
- List of Pakistan women ODI cricketers
- List of Papua New Guinea women ODI cricketers
- List of Scotland women ODI cricketers
- List of South Africa women ODI cricketers
- List of Sri Lanka women ODI cricketers
- List of Trinidad and Tobago women ODI cricketers
- List of United Arab Emirates women ODI cricketers
- List of United States women ODI cricketers
- List of West Indies women ODI cricketers
- List of Young England women ODI cricketers
- List of Zimbabwe women ODI cricketers

== See also ==
- Lists of Test cricketers
- Lists of Twenty20 International cricketers
