= List of Sweden women Twenty20 International cricketers =

This is a list of Sweden women 2020 International cricketers. A Women's 2020 International (WT20I) is an international cricket match between two representative teams. A T20I is played under the rules of 2020 cricket. In April 2018, the International Cricket Council (ICC) granted full international status to 2020 women's matches played between member sides from 1 July 2018 onwards. Sweden women played their first WT20I on 29 August 2021 against Norway.

The list is arranged in the order in which each player won her first 2020 cap. Where more than one player won her first 2020 cap in the same match, those players are listed alphabetically by surname.

== Key ==
General

- ‡ – Captain
- † – Wicket-keeper
- First – Year of debut
- Last – Year of latest game
- Mat – Number of matches played

Batting

- Runs – Runs scored in career
- HS – Highest score
- Avg – Runs scored per dismissal
- * – Batsman remained not out
- 50 – Number of half centuries

Bowling

- Balls – Balls bowled in career
- Wkt – Wickets taken in career
- BBI – Best bowling in an innings
- Ave – Average runs per wicket

Fielding

- Ca – Catches taken
- St – Stumpings affected

== Players ==
Statistics are correct as of 29 August 2026.

Sweden women T20I cricketers
General					Batting				Bowling				Fielding		Ref
No.	Name	First	Last	Mat	Runs	HS	Avg	50	Balls	Wkt	BBI	Ave	Ca	St	Ref
1	Abhilasha Singh	2021	2025	15	131	43	16.37	0	–	–	–	–	1	0	
2	Meghana Alugunoolla†	2021	2023	8	27	9	4.50	0	–	–	–	–	1	0	
3	Sai Devata	2021	2021	1	4	4*	–	0	6	1	1/9	9.00	0	0	
4	Cecillia Elmesioo	2021	2021	1	0	0	0	0	–	–	–	0	0	–	
5	Sofie Elmesioo	2021	2023	13	5	2*	1.66	0	138	10	4/20	13.40	0	0	
6	Neeha Kayani	2021	2022	7	1	1	1.00	0	114	9	3/15	9.33	0	0	
7	Sienna Linden	2021	2022	9	16	7	2.66	0	114	6	2/3	18.66	0	0	
8	Signe Lundell†	2021	2024	25	248	49	19.00	0	36	2	1/3	23.50	14	0	
9	Gunjan Shukla‡	2021	2025	29	218	37	13.62	0	565	33	5/7	13.36	12	0	
10	Rashmi Somashekhar	2021	2025	21	115	18*	12.77	0	96	5	2/9	16.80	6	0	
11	Tzoulietta Zilfidou	2021	2022	3	24	24*	24.00	0	6	0	–	–	0	0	
12	Daisy Holm	2022	2022	4	–	–	–	–	66	4	2/24	13.25	0	0	
13	Kanchan Rana	2022	2026	34	551	78	22.95	2	366	11	2/12	30.36	12	0	
14	Surya Ravuri	2022	2025	17	6	3*	–	0	330	14	4/4	18.50	4	0	
15	Anya Vaidya	2022	2026	34	459	69*	19.95	2	472	25	2/6	18.60	6	0	
16	Eman Asim	2022	2026	29	444	74*	24.66	2	–	–	–	–	9	0	
17	Imali Jayasooriya	2022	2026	23	100	15	6.25	0	390	14	2/7	22.42	3	0	
18	Elsa Thelander†	2022	2026	28	345	55	20.29	2	–	–	–	–	8	6	
19	Hareer Chamto	2023	2026	26	30	8	3.33	0	390	9	2/12	35.66	3	0	
20	Saanvi Bhanushali	2023	2023	4	4	3*	2.00	0	66	4	2/34	22.25	0	0	
21	Ekaterina Bogdanova	2023	2025	6	13	11	2.16	0	–	–	–	–	0	0	
22	Dia Gangwani	2023	2023	4	26	26*	13.00	0	–	–	–	–	1	0	
23	Maria Ahsan	2023	2023	4	–	–	–	–	90	4	3/11	13.25	0	0	
24	Fatima Zahra	2023	2026	6	0	0*	–	0	92	7	5/2	11.00	0	0	
25	Ritu Raheja	2024	2024	4	18	11*	18.00	0	–	–	–	–	0	0	
26	Hariharan Shreya	2024	2026	9	0	0*	–	0	108	9	3/17	11.33	1	0	
27	Zara Mohammad	2024	2026	18	59	19	9.83	0	288	14	3/15	22.85	2	0	
28	Gaya Jayaweera	2024	2025	4	4	4	2.00	0	20	4	4/11	8.00	2	0	
29	Malyan Yusuf	2025	2026	8	10	5*	10.00	0	102	6	3/4	13.83	0	0	
30	Pearl Bilimoria	2025	2025	1	–	–	–	–	–	–	–	–	0	0	
31	Dewa Chamto	2025	2025	3	4	4	2.00	0	–	–	–	–	0	0	
32	Kaashvi Kanwar	2025	2025	3	0	0*	–	0	18	0	–	–	0	0	
33	Matilda Fred	2025	2025	1	–	–	–	–	12	1	1/10	10.00	1	0	
34	Anjali Natarajan	2026	2026	3	–	–	–	–	–	–	–	–	0	0	
34	Dipika Chhetri	2026	2026	2	–	–	–	–	6	1	1/6	6.00	0	0	
