= Lists of Test cricketers =

Lists of Test cricketers are lists of Test cricket players.

== By team ==
- List of Afghanistan Test cricketers
- List of Australia Test cricketers
- List of Bangladesh Test cricketers
- List of England Test cricketers
- List of India Test cricketers
- List of Ireland Test cricketers
- List of New Zealand Test cricketers
- List of Pakistan Test cricketers
- List of South Africa Test cricketers
- List of Sri Lanka Test cricketers
- List of West Indies Test cricketers
- List of World XI Test cricketers
- List of Zimbabwe Test cricketers

== Women ==
- List of Australia women Test cricketers
- List of England women Test cricketers
- List of India women Test cricketers
- List of Ireland women Test cricketers
- List of Netherlands women Test cricketers
- List of New Zealand women Test cricketers
- List of Pakistan women Test cricketers
- List of South Africa women Test cricketers
- List of Sri Lanka women Test cricketers
- List of West Indies women Test cricketers

== See also ==
- List of cricketers who have played 100 Tests
- Lists of One Day International cricketers
- Lists of Twenty20 International cricketers
