= List of Serbia women Twenty20 International cricketers =

This is a list of Serbia women Twenty20 International cricketers. A Women's Twenty20 International (WT20I) is an international cricket match between two representative teams. A T20I is played under the rules of Twenty20 cricket. In April 2018, the International Cricket Council (ICC) granted full international status to Twenty20 women's matches played between member sides from 1 July 2018 onwards. Serbia women played their first WT20I on 10 September 2022 against Greece during the 2022 Women's Balkan Cup in Romania.

This list includes names of players who have played at least one WT20I match for Serbia. The list is arranged in the order in which each player won her first Twenty20 cap. Where more than one player won her first Twenty20 cap in the same match, those players are listed alphabetically by surname.

== Key ==
General

- ‡ – Captain
- † – Wicket-keeper
- First – Year of debut
- Last – Year of latest game
- Mat – Number of matches played

Batting

- Runs – Runs scored in career
- HS – Highest score
- Avg – Runs scored per dismissal
- * – Batsman remained not out
- 50 – Number of half centuries

Bowling

- Balls – Balls bowled in career
- Wkt – Wickets taken in career
- BBI – Best bowling in an innings
- Ave – Average runs per wicket

Fielding

- Ca – Catches taken
- St – Stumpings affected

== Players ==
Statistics are correct as of 6 September 2026.

Serbia women T20I cricketers
| General | | | | | Batting | | | | Bowling | | | | Fielding | | Ref |
| No. | Name | First | Last | Mat | Runs | HS | Avg | 50 | Balls | Wkt | BBI | Ave | Ca | St | Ref |
|---|---|---|---|---|---|---|---|---|---|---|---|---|---|---|---|
| 1 | Jelena Batovac | 2022 | 2022 | 3 | 0 | 0 | 0.00 | 0 | 0 | 24 | 0 | – | – | 0 | 0 |
| 2 | Natalija Jovićevic† | 2022 | 2024 | 13 | 2 | 2 | 0.33 | 0 | 0 | – | – | – | – | 3 | 1 |
| 3 | Teodora Martic | 2022 | 2024 | 17 | 36 | 10 | 2.76 | 0 | 0 | 12 | 1 | 1/7 | 21.00 | 1 | 0 |
| 4 | Sladjana Matijevic‡ | 2022 | 2026 | 23 | 251 | 36* | 14.76 | 0 | 0 | 385 | 20 | 4/16 | 21.00 | 7 | 0 |
| 5 | Ana Mileusnic† | 2022 | 2023 | 8 | 50 | 19 | 8.33 | 0 | 0 | 41 | 1 | 1/30 | 63.00 | 1 | 0 |
| 6 | Mirjana Mratinkovic | 2022 | 2022 | 3 | 16 | 8 | 5.33 | 0 | 0 | 6 | 0 | – | – | 0 | 0 |
| 7 | Marija Mratinkovic | 2022 | 2024 | 4 | 0 | 0 | 0.00 | 0 | 0 | – | – | – | – | 0 | 0 |
| 8 | Magdalena Nikolic‡ | 2022 | 2025 | 21 | 173 | 24* | 12.35 | 0 | 0 | 66 | 1 | 1/33 | 65.00 | 3 | 0 |
| 9 | Nadja Nojic‡ | 2022 | 2026 | 29 | 219 | 44* | 12.88 | 0 | 0 | 617 | 28 | 3/9 | 19.78 | 1 | 0 |
| 10 | Ana Mratinkovic Petkoski | 2022 | 2022 | 3 | 3 | 2 | 1.50 | 0 | 0 | – | – | – | – | 0 | 0 |
| 11 | Tamara Trajkovic† | 2022 | 2025 | 20 | 217 | 46* | 12.17 | 0 | 0 | 267 | 16 | 3/15 | 17.81 | 2 | 0 |
| 12 | Mirsada Bislimovic | 2023 | 2023 | 5 | 2 | 0 | 0.00 | 0 | 0 | 36 | 3 | 3/31 | 15.00 | 1 | 0 |
| 13 | Vera Bislimovic | 2023 | 2023 | 4 | 11 | 9 | 3.66 | 0 | 0 | 42 | 0 | – | – | 0 | 0 |
| 14 | Jovana Burton | 2023 | 2024 | 7 | 0 | 0* | 0.00 | 0 | 0 | – | – | – | – | 2 | 0 |
| 15 | Sara Simic | 2023 | 2026 | 15 | 2 | 1* | 1.00 | 0 | 0 | 127 | 3 | 1/13 | 59.00 | 3 | 0 |
| 16 | Elena Prokic | 2023 | 2026 | 19 | 18 | 5* | 3.60 | 0 | 0 | 230 | 9 | 2/12 | 35.44 | 3 | 0 |
| 17 | Ana Mesarovic | 2024 | 2025 | 10 | 278 | 80* | 39.71 | 1 | 0 | 208 | 12 | 3/7 | 16.75 | 2 | 0 |
| 18 | Milica Perisic | 2024 | 2026 | 21 | 141 | 46 | 7.42 | 0 | 0 | 72 | 5 | 2/8 | 11.80 | 7 | 0 |
| 19 | Marija Trajkovi | 2024 | 2026 | 17 | 24 | 14 | 4.80 | 0 | 0 | 210 | 14 | 3/16 | 14.35 | 2 | 0 |
| 20 | Maja Jevdjenovic | 2024 | 2026 | 11 | 35 | 14* | 8.75 | 0 | 0 | 158 | 7 | 3/15 | 23.28 | 0 | 0 |
| 21 | Dijana Trajkovic | 2024 | 2024 | 1 | – | – | – | – | – | – | – | – | – | 0 | 0 |
| 22 | Bojana Ercegovcevic | 2024 | 2026 | 12 | 34 | 12 | 5.66 | 0 | 0 | 6 | 1 | 1/6 | 6.00 | 2 | 0 |
| 23 | Lara Jevremovic | 2024 | 2024 | 2 | – | – | – | – | – | – | – | – | – | 0 | 0 |
| 24 | Dunja Demic | 2025 | 2026 | 12 | 213 | 108* | 23.66 | 0 | 1 | 24 | 5 | 4/4 | 3.80 | 3 | 1 |
| 25 | Andjela Djordjevic | 2026 | 2026 | 6 | 0 | 0* | – | 0 | 0 | – | – | – | – | 1 | 0 |
| 26 | Bojana Radevic | 2026 | 2026 | 4 | – | – | – | 0 | 0 | – | – | – | – | 0 | 0 |
| 27 | Kristina Ristic | 2026 | 2026 | 6 | 3 | 3 | 1.50 | 0 | 0 | – | – | – | – | 5 | 0 |
| 28 | Milica Stevanovic | 2026 | 2026 | 8 | 125 | 37* | 17.85 | 0 | 0 | 168 | 7 | 2/20 | 22.00 | 1 | 0 |
| 29 | Andjelka Matovic | 2026 | 2026 | 3 | 0 | 0* | – | 0 | 0 | – | – | – | – | 0 | 0 |
| 30 | Ivana Radevic | 2026 | 2026 | 3 | – | – | – | 0 | 0 | – | – | – | – | 0 | 0 |
| 31 | Jana Majski | 2026 | 2026 | 4 | 1 | 1 | 1.00 | 0 | 0 | 96 | 8 | 4/8 | 7.37 | 0 | 0 |
| 32 | Dunja Miskovic | 2026 | 2026 | 3 | 10 | 5 | 5.00 | 0 | 0 | 96 | 8 | 4/8 | 7.37 | 0 | 0 |
