= List of Sierra Leone women Twenty20 International cricketers =

This is a list of Sierra Leone women Twenty20 International cricketers. A Twenty20 International (T20I) is an international cricket match between two representative teams, each having T20I status, as determined by the International Cricket Council (ICC). A T20I match is played under the rules of Twenty20 cricket.

This list includes all players who have played at least one T20I match and is initially arranged in the order of debut appearance. Where more than one player won their first cap in the same match, their names are initially listed alphabetically at the time of debut.

== Key ==
General

- ‡ – Captain
- † – Wicket-keeper
- First – Year of debut
- Last – Year of latest game
- Mat – Number of matches played

Batting

- Runs – Runs scored in career
- HS – Highest score
- Avg – Runs scored per dismissal
- * – Batsman remained not out
- 50 – Number of half centuries

Bowling

- Wkt – Wickets taken in career
- BBI – Best bowling in an innings
- Ave – Average runs per wicket

Fielding

- Ca – Catches taken
- St – Stumpings affected

== List of players ==
Statistics are correct as of 6 September 2025.

Sierra Leone women T20I cricketers
General					Batting				Bowling				Fielding		Ref
No.	Name	First	Last	Mat	Runs	HS	Avg	50	Balls	Wkt	BBI	Ave	Ca	St	Ref
1	Adama Kamara	2018	2021	11	91	32*	15.16	0	114	4	1/10	30.00	2	0	
2	Aminata Kamara‡	2018	2025	46	598	88*	15.33	1	700	33	3/3	19.66	6	0	
3	Festina Bangur	2018	2019	8	0	0*	–	0	114	2	1/11	72.50	0	0	
4	Linda Bull‡	2018	2025	45	230	21*	10.00	0	447	28	4/10	12.96	9	0	
5	Ann Marie Kamara	2018	2025	51	557	84*	16.38	2	949	36	3/20	22.44	8	0	
6	Zainab Kamara‡†	2018	2025	54	321	37*	11.46	0	372	24	4/7	13.66	14	1	
7	Ramatu Kassim	2018	2022	12	3	2*	–	0	72	2	1/8	45.50	3	0	
8	Mabinty King†	2018	2022	13	184	59*	23.00	1	–	–	–	–	1	0	
9	Isatu Koroma	2018	2023	12	40	12	5.71	0	18	1	1/4	15.00	3	0	
10	Janet Kowa	2018	2024	32	113	18*	8.69	0	622	32	3/7	15.53	4	0	
11	Mabinty Sankoh†	2018	2022	18	132	23	8.80	0	6	1	1/1	1.00	6	1	
12	Fatmata Parkinson‡	2018	2025	25	83	30*	8.30	0	–	–	–	–	4	0	
13	Mary Sheriff	2019	2025	13	16	6	2.66	0	66	1	1/9	63.00	4	0	
14	Nancy Squire†	2019	2025	3	0	0*	–	0	–	–	–	–	0	0	
15	Fatu Pessima‡	2021	2025	32	103	22	7.92	0	465	31	4/14	11.16	8	0	
16	Marie Turay	2021	2025	43	206	32	7.92	0	131	3	1/4	33.66	13	0	
17	Celina Bull	2023	2025	40	432	41*	12.34	0	487	21	2/3	20.28	9	0	
18	Fatu Conteh†	2023	2025	26	200	26	10.52	0	–	–	–	–	9	0	
19	Alice Fillie	2023	2025	23	17	8*	3.40	0	354	22	4/11	14.63	1	0	
20	Emma Kamara	2023	2025	34	521	71	17.96	1	486	26	4/7	16.65	12	0	
21	Fatu Kamara	2023	2023	3	5	4	2.50	0	–	–	–	–	0	0	
22	Isha Quee	2023	2023	8	2	2*	2.00	0	102	8	3/13	11.12	1	0	
23	Hassanatu Sawaneh	2023	2025	11	24	14	3.42	0	108	3	1/7	39.33	2	0	
24	Hussainatu Sawanneh	2023	2025	21	31	8*	4.42	0	–	–	–	–	3	0	
25	Ramatu Turay†	2023	2024	6	61	30	12.20	0	–	–	–	–	4	0	
26	Jane Newland	2024	2025	11	77	37*	12.83	0	42	2	2/19	32.00	2	0	
27	Theresa Tommy	2024	2024	3	0	0	0.00	0	–	–	–	–	1	0	
28	Patrica Pratt	2025	2025	20	29	6*	4.14	0	72	5	2/10	13.60	0	0	
29	Aisha Bangura	2025	2025	14	14	7	2.80	0	143	6	2/12	30.16	1	0	
