= List of Chile Twenty20 International cricketers =

This is a list of Chilean Twenty20 International cricketers. In April 2018, the ICC decided to grant full Twenty20 International (T20I) status to all its members. Therefore, all Twenty20 matches played between Chile and other ICC members after 1 January 2019 will be eligible for T20I status.

This list comprises all members of the Chile cricket team who have played at least one T20I match. It is initially arranged in the order in which each player won his first Twenty20 cap. Where more than one player won his first Twenty20 cap in the same match, they are listed alphabetically by surname. Chile played their first T20I matches during the 2019 South American Cricket Championship in October 2019.

== Key ==
General

- ‡ – Captain
- † – Wicket-keeper
- First – Year of debut
- Last – Year of latest game
- Mat – Number of matches played

Batting

- Runs – Runs scored in career
- HS – Highest score
- Avg – Runs scored per dismissal
- 50 – Number of half centuries
- * – Batsman remained not out

Bowling

- Balls – Balls bowled in career
- Wkt – Wickets taken in career
- BBI – Best bowling in an innings
- Ave – Average runs per wicket

Fielding

- Ca – Catches taken
- St – Stumpings affected

== List of players ==
Statistics are correct as of 20 October 2023.

Chile T20I cricketers
| General | | | | | Batting | | | | Bowling | | | | Fielding | | Ref |
| No. | Name | First | Last | Mat | Runs | HS | Avg | 50 | Balls | Wkt | BBI | Ave | Ca | St | Ref |
|---|---|---|---|---|---|---|---|---|---|---|---|---|---|---|---|
| 1 | Alex Carthew‡ | 2019 | 2023 | 6 | 14 | 6* | 14.00 | 0 | 30 | 2 | 1/12 | 15.50 | 0 | 0 | |
| 2 | Chris Emmott | 2019 | 2019 | 2 | 4 | 4 | 2.00 | 0 | – | – | – | – | 0 | 0 | |
| 3 | Kamlesh Gupta‡† | 2019 | 2019 | 4 | 46 | 19* | 15.33 | 0 | – | – | – | – | 3 | 1 | |
| 4 | Hardev Singh | 2019 | 2019 | 3 | 23 | 17 | 7.66 | 0 | 6 | 1 | 1/12 | 12.00 | 0 | 0 | |
| 5 | Hirenkumar Patel | 2019 | 2019 | 4 | 74 | 22 | 18.50 | 0 | 90 | 7 | 4/21 | 11.71 | 2 | 0 | |
| 6 | Irfan Mir | 2019 | 2019 | 4 | 19 | 18* | 19.00 | 0 | 90 | 1 | 1/26 | 73.00 | 0 | 0 | |
| 7 | Major Mandy | 2019 | 2019 | 4 | 54 | 32 | 13.50 | 0 | 48 | 3 | 2/19 | 14.33 | 4 | 0 | |
| 8 | Mayank Patel | 2019 | 2019 | 3 | 12 | 8 | 4.00 | 0 | – | – | – | – | 0 | 0 | |
| 9 | Shoaib Gazi Hossain | 2019 | 2019 | 4 | 2 | 2 | 2.00 | 0 | 12 | 0 | – | – | 0 | 0 | |
| 10 | Aresh Srivastav | 2019 | 2019 | 4 | 25 | 21 | 6.25 | 0 | 48 | 3 | 2/28 | 24.33 | 1 | 0 | |
| 11 | Amit Uniyal | 2019 | 2023 | 5 | 31 | 16* | 7.75 | 0 | 84 | 5 | 3/17 | 18.00 | 1 | 0 | |
| 12 | Rolando Rivas | 2019 | 2019 | 3 | 0 | 0 | 0.00 | 0 | 24 | 1 | 1/45 | 45.00 | 0 | 0 | |
| 13 | Ignacio Lisboa | 2019 | 2023 | 2 | 4 | 2 | 2.00 | 0 | 12 | 0 | – | – | 0 | 0 | |
| 14 | Michael Meade | 2019 | 2019 | 1 | 0 | 0 | 0.00 | 0 | – | – | – | – | 1 | 0 | |
| 15 | Guillermo Aburto | 2023 | 2023 | 2 | 4 | 4 | 2.00 | 0 | 24 | 1 | 1/17 | 28.00 | 0 | 0 | |
| 16 | Nelson Aburto | 2023 | 2023 | 1 | 1 | 1 | 1.00 | 0 | – | – | – | – | 0 | 0 | |
| 17 | John Bartlett | 2023 | 2023 | 2 | 6 | 5 | 3.00 | 0 | 6 | 0 | – | – | 0 | 0 | |
| 18 | Jack Inglis | 2023 | 2023 | 1 | – | – | – | – | – | – | – | – | 0 | 0 | |
| 19 | Mario Ovalle† | 2023 | 2023 | 2 | 2 | 2 | 2.00 | 0 | – | – | – | – | 1 | 0 | |
| 20 | Alfredo Puentes | 2023 | 2023 | 2 | 4 | 4* | – | 0 | 2 | 0 | – | – | 1 | 0 | |
| 21 | Anthony Roe | 2023 | 2023 | 2 | 13 | 13 | 6.50 | 0 | – | – | – | – | 0 | 0 | |
| 22 | Simon Shalders | 2023 | 2023 | 2 | 21 | 21 | 10.50 | 0 | – | – | – | – | 1 | 0 | |
| 23 | Edward Taylor | 2023 | 2023 | 2 | 17 | 14 | 8.50 | 0 | 36 | 2 | 2/24 | 20.50 | 0 | 0 | |
| 24 | Benjamin Constanzo | 2023 | 2023 | 1 | 1 | 1 | 1.00 | 0 | – | – | – | – | 0 | 0 | |
