= List of Malta women Twenty20 International cricketers =

This is a list of Malta women Twenty20 International cricketers. A Women's Twenty20 International (WT20I) is an international cricket match between two representative teams. A T20I is played under the rules of Twenty20 cricket. In April 2018, the International Cricket Council (ICC) granted full international status to Twenty20 women's matches played between member sides from 1 July 2018 onwards. Malta women played their first WT20I on 27 August 2022 against Romania during the 2022 Women's Continental Cup in Romania.

The list is arranged in the order in which each player won her first Twenty20 cap. Where more than one player won her first Twenty20 cap in the same match, those players are listed alphabetically by surname.

== Key ==
General

- ‡ – Captain
- † – Wicket-keeper
- First – Year of debut
- Last – Year of latest game
- Mat – Number of matches played

Batting

- Runs – Runs scored in career
- HS – Highest score
- Avg – Runs scored per dismissal
- * – Batsman remained not out
- 50 – Number of half centuries

Bowling

- Balls – Balls bowled in career
- Wkt – Wickets taken in career
- BBI – Best bowling in an innings
- Ave – Average runs per wicket

Fielding

- Ca – Catches taken
- St – Stumpings affected

== Players ==
Statistics are correct as of 20 June 2026.

Malta women T20I cricketers
General					Batting				Bowling				Fielding		Ref
No.	Name	First	Last	Mat	Runs	HS	Avg	50	Balls	Wkt	BBI	Ave	Ca	St	Ref
1	Anvy Vimal	2022	2022	2	–	–	–	–	12	0	–	–	0	0	
2	Donnaver Bejec	2022	2022	3	–	–	–	–	6	0	–	–	1	0	
3	Shamla Cholasseri‡†	2022	2024	18	199	38	11.70	0	148	10	4/9	13.20	7	1	
4	Katerina Demetrova	2022	2022	3	17	7	17.00	0	48	2	1/4	10.50	0	0	
5	Heila Du Toit	2022	2022	3	9	9*	–	0	12	0	–	–	3	0	
6	Charlotte Evans	2022	2022	3	1	1	0.50	0	48	2	2/10	19.00	2	0	
7	Sayeda Jahani	2022	2022	3	78	42*	78.00	0	24	1	1/9	9.00	2	0	
8	Anupama Rameshan	2022	2026	25	340	46*	18.88	0	527	28	4/20	17.50	11	0	
9	Jessica Rymer‡†	2022	2026	18	192	51*	12.80	1	–	–	–	–	9	0	
10	Thambi Kurapati	2022	2025	15	4	3	0.66	0	194	10	4/17	17.50	2	0	
11	Remya Vipin	2022	2022	3	–	–	–	–	42	2	1/20	22.00	0	0	
12	Cucku Kurian	2022	2022	1	–	–	–	–	–	–	–	–	0	0	
13	Keeranmai Mandava	2022	2022	1	–	–	–	–	–	–	–	–	0	0	
14	Prativa Bhandari	2023	2023	4	8	8	2.66	0	78	5	3/42	26.80	0	0	
15	Bibina Baby	2023	2024	10	1	1	0.50	0	24	1	1/8	42.00	1	0	
16	Tracy Calingin	2023	2023	4	0	0*	–	0	12	0	–	–	2	0	
17	Svitlana Iushchenko	2023	2025	15	29	6*	4.83	0	–	–	–	–	2	0	
18	Sushma Khatri	2023	2024	8	3	2*	1.00	0	43	1	1/8	79.00	2	0	
19	Mae Macelli	2023	2023	4	0	0*	–	0	–	–	–	–	0	0	
20	Jyoti Neupane	2023	2023	3	–	–	–	–	–	–	–	–	0	0	
21	Clarire Sammut	2023	2023	4	0	0	0.00	0	–	–	–	–	0	0	
22	Angelique las Pinas	2023	2023	1	–	–	–	–	–	–	–	–	0	0	
23	Aneeta Santhosh	2024	2024	10	88	28	9.77	0	150	4	2/24	48.50	5	0	
24	Stella Arooja	2024	2026	16	32	8	2.28	0	12	0	–	–	1	0	
25	Silvana Bandeva	2024	2026	10	0	0*	0.00	0	–	–	–	–	0	0	
26	Likhitha Yadav	2024	2026	18	129	37*	9.92	0	320	13	2/13	28.15	3	0	
27	Thanooja Sharfudheen	2024	2026	18	65	21	3.82	0	164	7	3/34	26.57	1	0	
28	Sneha Shankar	2024	2024	6	14	8	2.33	0	11	0	–	–	0	0	
29	Sandra Coelho	2024	2026	4	0	0*	0.00	0	–	–	–	–	0	0	
30	Silda Joy	2024	2026	10	26	7	2.60	0	204	12	3/13	15.66	0	0	
31	Soha Naveed	2024	2024	5	7	4	1.40	0	–	–	–	–	0	0	
32	Radhakrishnan Renjini	2024	2025	3	2	2	2.00	0	–	–	–	–	0	0	
33	Sanjana Budhathoki	2025	2025	2	2	2	2.00	0	48	5	4/13	7.00	1	0	
34	Sneha Shankari	2025	2025	2	5	5*	–	0	–	–	–	–	0	0	
35	Nicola De Bromhead	2026	2026	5	18	7	3.60	0	78	0	–	–	4	0	
36	Swetha Don	2026	2026	5	14	6	2.80	0	48	5	3/19	8.40	1	0	
37	Reshma Raghavan	2026	2026	5	7	2	1.40	0	6	0	–	–	0	0	
38	Susan George	2026	2026	5	12	7*	3.00	0	60	2	1/7	30.00	1	0	
