= List of Romania women Twenty20 International cricketers =

This is a list of Romania women Twenty20 International cricketers. A Women's Twenty20 International (WT20I) is an international cricket match between two representative teams. A T20I is played under the rules of Twenty20 cricket. In April 2018, the International Cricket Council (ICC) granted full international status to Twenty20 women's matches played between member sides from 1 July 2018 onwards. Romania women played their first WT20I on 27 August 2022 against Malta during the 2022 Women's Continental Cup in Romania.

The list is arranged in the order in which each player won her first Twenty20 cap. Where more than one player won her first Twenty20 cap in the same match, their surnames are listed alphabetically.

== Key ==
General

- ‡ – Captain
- † – Wicket-keeper
- First – Year of debut
- Last – Year of latest game
- Mat – Number of matches played

Batting

- Runs – Runs scored in career
- HS – Highest score
- Avg – Runs scored per dismissal
- * – Batsman remained not out
- 50 – Number of half centuries
- 100 – Centuries scored

Bowling

- Balls – Balls bowled in career
- Wkt – Wickets taken in career
- BBI – Best bowling in an innings
- Ave – Average runs per wicket

Fielding

- Ca – Catches taken
- St – Stumpings affected

== Players ==
Statistics are correct as of 28 August 2026.

Romania women T20I cricketers
General					Batting					Bowling				Fielding		Ref
No.	Name	First	Last	Mat	Runs	HS	Avg	50	100	Balls	Wkt	BBI	Ave	Ca	St	Ref
1	Alexandra Ciric	2022	2022	6	14	7	3.50	0	0	24	1	1/3	30.00	0	0	
2	Roxana Ciric	2022	2022	3	21	20	10.50	0	0	42	0	–	–	1	0	
3	Ashaani Durayalage	2022	2023	11	54	19	6.00	0	0	54	1	1/28	51.00	0	0	
4	Stefania Ludmila†	2022	2022	4	30	12	15.00	0	0	–	–	–	–	0	0	
5	Clara Popa‡	2022	2023	12	7	7	1.16	0	0	235	5	1/14	39.80	1	0	
6	Elena Predescu	2022	2022	7	15	11	5.00	0	0	76	5	5/9	15.60	0	0	
7	Chamila Priyadarshani	2022	2022	7	12	5*	3.00	0	0	24	2	1/0	6.00	0	0	
8	Izabela Singuran	2022	2022	6	70	36	14.00	0	0	73	1	1/14	55.00	0	0	
9	Andrea Stanacu	2022	2022	3	27	13	13.50	0	0	–	–	–	–	0	0	
10	Stefania Tudorache	2022	2023	15	42	15	3.81	0	0	186	7	3/25	23.00	0	0	
11	Andrea Vasilescu‡	2022	2022	6	3	2	1.50	0	0	35	2	1/2	28.50	0	0	
12	Emanuela Baota	2022	2022	5	40	21	10.00	0	0	78	6	4/15	11.16	0	0	
13	Rebecca Blake‡	2022	2026	20	1,224	135*	133.18	3	9	205	8	2/7	25.12	7	0	
14	Madalina Marin†	2022	2026	20	26	11	2.88	0	0	–	–	–	–	6	1	
15	Andreea Totora	2022	2022	1	–	–	–	–	–	12	0	–	–	0	0	
16	Alina Ciuciulin	2022	2022	1	–	–	–	–	–	–	–	–	–	0	0	
17	Chirila Ana	2023	2023	9	56	27	6.22	0	0	176	4	1/11	43.50	1	0	
18	Madalina Chereches	2023	2023	4	11	6	2.75	0	0	54	1	1/30	87.00	0	0	
19	Cristina Cirlig	2023	2026	14	13	8	2.60	0	0	74	3	1/7	35.33	0	0	
20	Arumadura Dineshi	2023	2023	4	5	3	1.25	0	0	6	0	–	–	0	0	
21	Sorina Moise	2023	2023	9	5	3*	2.50	0	0	16	0	–	–	0	0	
22	Iuliana Muntean	2023	2026	15	38	20	5.42	0	0	258	9	2/15	31.33	3	0	
23	Cristiana Sanda	2023	2023	1	1	1	1.00	0	0	–	–	–	–	0	0	
24	Raducu Andreea	2023	2023	8	6	4	1.50	0	0	6	0	–	–	0	0	
25	Crina Hotescu	2023	2023	5	–	–	–	–	–	–	–	–	–	0	0	
26	Florentina Radu	2023	2023	5	0	0	0.00	0	0	–	–	–	–	0	0	
27	Daniela Chirita	2023	2023	1	–	–	–	–	–	–	–	–	–	0	0	
28	Ramona Chirila	2023	2023	2	–	–	–	–	–	–	–	–	–	0	0	
29	Jennifer Chirila	2025	2025	4	30	14*	30.00	0	0	84	1	1/21	72.00	0	0	
30	Gabriela Ionita	2025	2026	6	0	0	0.00	0	0	–	–	–	–	0	0	
31	Maya Kearvell	2025	2026	7	179	40	35.80	0	0	71	3	1/8	35.66	2	0	
32	Niroshi Kuruppu	2025	2025	3	24	14	8.00	0	0	–	–	–	–	0	0	
33	Alina Lupascu	2025	2026	7	2	2	2.00	0	0	102	5	3/15	26.60	3	0	
34	Ishini Palliya	2025	2025	4	0	0	0.00	0	0	–	–	–	–	0	0	
35	Daria Tanase	2025	2026	7	0	0	0.00	0	0	96	6	4/9	16.66	0	0	
36	Stefania Slavaston	2025	2025	1	–	–	–	–	–	–	–	–	–	0	0	
37	Maria Ababi	2026	2026	3	–	–	–	–	–	42	4	2/29	14.50	0	0	
38	Mihaela Stan	2026	2026	2	–	–	–	–	–	–	–	–	–	0	0	
39	Herath Bandara	2026	2026	2	–	–	–	–	–	12	0	–	–	0	0	
40	Raisa Cristina	2026	2026	1	–	–	–	–	–	12	0	–	–	0	0	
