= List of Slovenia Twenty20 International cricketers =

This is a list of Slovenian Twenty20 International cricketers.

In April 2018, the International Cricket Council (ICC) decided to grant full Twenty20 International (T20I) status to all its members. Therefore, all Twenty20 matches played between Hungary and other ICC members after 1 January 2019 have T20I status.

This list will comprise all members of the Hungary cricket team who have played at least one T20I match. It is initially arranged in the order in which each player won his first Twenty20 cap. Where more than one player will win his first Twenty20 cap in the same match, those players are listed alphabetically by surname (according to the name format used by Cricinfo).

Slovenia played their first match with T20I status on 25 July 2022, against Austria during the 2022–23 ICC Men's T20 World Cup Europe Qualifier B.

== Key ==
General

- ‡ – Captain
- † – Wicket-keeper
- First – Year of debut
- Last – Year of latest game
- Mat – Number of matches played

Batting

- Runs – Runs scored in career
- HS – Highest score
- Avg – Runs scored per dismissal
- * – Batsman remained not out
- 50 – Half-centuries scored

Bowling

- Balls – Balls bowled in career
- Wkt – Wickets taken in career
- BBI – Best bowling in an innings
- Ave – Average runs per wicket

Fielding

- Ca – Catches taken
- St – Stumpings affected

== List of players ==
Statistics are correct as of 22 May 2026.

Slovenia T20I cricketers
General					Batting					Bowling				Fielding		Ref
No.	Name	First	Last	Mat	Runs	HS	Avg	50	100	Balls	Wkt	BBI	Ave	Ca	St	Ref
1	Awais Ikram	2022	2025	6	29	10*	7.25	0	0	90	6	2/34	28.00	3	0	
2	Ayyaz Qureshi‡	2022	2025	6	87	30	17.40	0	0	80	5	2/25	22.80	0	0	
3	Sudhakar Koppolu	2022	2025	17	212	34*	16.30	0	0	219	8	2/20	45.12	5	0	
4	Mazhar Khan†	2022	2024	5	11	7	3.66	0	0	–	–	–	–	0	0	
5	Shoaib Siddiqui	2022	2025	15	298	48	19.86	0	0	324	20	4/25	19.65	6	0	
6	Mark Oman	2022	2022	4	5	2	2.50	0	0	–	–	–	–	2	0	
7	Primoz Pustoslemsek	2022	2025	6	51	21	8.50	0	0	81	5	2/23	20.00	2	0	
8	Ramanjot Singh	2022	2024	5	103	46	20.60	0	0	18	0	–	–	1	0	
9	Shahid Arshad	2022	2026	20	221	28*	11.63	0	0	18	0	–	–	12	0	
10	Taher Muhammad	2022	2026	21	230	42	10.95	0	0	220	7	2/22	49.14	2	0	
11	Nilesh Ujawe	2022	2022	4	3	1*	3.00	0	0	54	3	2/12	19.66	1	0	
12	Waqar Khan†	2022	2026	19	155	31	10.33	0	0	60	7	3/35	18.57	7	0	
13	Bhagwant Sandhu	2022	2022	1	2	2	2.00	0	0	–	–	–	–	0	0	
14	Dileep Pallekonda†	2022	2026	17	62	17*	6.88	0	0	210	14	3/26	23.14	4	0	
15	Izaz Ali‡	2024	2026	20	369	118	18.45	1	1	365	19	4/14	28.68	13	0	
16	Junaed Mullah†	2024	2024	2	28	26	14.00	0	0	–	–	–	–	0	0	
17	Merwais Shinwari	2024	2024	6	13	12	6.50	0	0	114	8	4/31	16.87	2	0	
18	Rasheed Ali Mamadkhel†	2024	2025	16	202	37	13.46	0	0	12	0	–	–	8	0	
19	Saeed Waqar Ali	2024	2026	16	25	8	3.57	0	0	262	15	2/15	29.53	5	0	
20	Tarun Sharma	2024	2026	18	233	43	12.94	0	0	–	–	–	–	8	0	
21	Krishna Sharma	2024	2025	4	11	8*	11.00	0	0	6	0	–	–	1	0	
22	Haris Karim	2024	2025	1	1	1*	–	0	0	42	1	1/39	66.00	1	0	
23	Dinesh Matla	2024	2026	11	27	9	4.50	0	0	–	–	–	–	2	0	
24	Owen Groves	2025	2026	7	189	77*	37.80	2	0	13	0	–	–	2	0	
25	Jaka Mikulic	2025	2025	1	–	–	–	–	–	–	–	–	–	0	0	
26	Dayal Joy	2025	2025	3	12	9	4.00	0	0	36	1	1/23	63.00	2	0	
27	Rizwan Zahoor	2025	2025	2	16	15*	–	0	0	–	–	–	–	0	0	
28	Jack Kovacic	2026	2026	4	38	25	12.66	0	0	90	4	2/18	24.75	0	0	
29	Shiva Mani	2026	2026	3	6	6*	12.66	0	0	18	1	1/29	43.00	0	0	
29	Arul Kumaran	2026	2026	2	6	5	3.00	0	0	1	0	—	—	0	0	
