= List of Belgium women Twenty20 International cricketers =

This is a list of Belgium women Twenty20 International cricketers. A Women's Twenty20 International (WT20I) is an international cricket match between two representative teams. A T20I is played under the rules of Twenty20 cricket. In April 2018, the International Cricket Council (ICC) granted full international status to Twenty20 women's matches played between member sides from 1 July 2018 onwards. Belgium women played their first WT20I on 25 September 2021 against Austria during a tour of Austria.

The list is arranged in the order in which each player won her first Twenty20 cap. Where more than one player won her first Twenty20 cap in the same match, those players are listed alphabetically by surname.

== Key ==
General

- ‡ – Captain
- † – Wicket-keeper
- First – Year of debut
- Last – Year of latest game
- Mat – Number of matches played

Batting

- Runs – Runs scored in career
- HS – Highest score
- Avg – Runs scored per dismissal
- * – Batter remained not out
- 50 – Number of half centuries

Bowling

- Balls – Balls bowled in career
- Wkt – Wickets taken in career
- BBI – Best bowling in an innings
- Ave – Average runs per wicket

Fielding

- Ca – Catches taken
- St – Stumpings affected

== Players ==
Statistics are correct as of 6 September 2026.

Belgium women T20I cricketers
General					Batting				Bowling				Fielding		Ref
No.	Name	First	Last	Mat	Runs	HS	Avg	50	Balls	Wkt	BBI	Ave	Ca	St	Ref
1	Zara Amanda	2021	2021	3	14	14	14.00	0	64	0	–	–	0	0	
2	Anya Beairsto	2021	2021	3	29	13	14.50	0	72	1	1/38	102.00	0	0	
3	Rosemary Lister	2021	2026	11	28	7	3.11	0	–	–	–	–	1	0	
4	Jani Mclean	2021	2021	3	10	7	10.00	0	–	–	–	–	0	0	
5	Susan Parker	2021	2021	1	–	–	–	–	–	–	–	–	0	0	
6	Anindita Pramanik†	2021	2021	3	7	7	7.00	0	–	–	–	–	1	0	
7	Ananya Singh	2021	2024	7	30	17	7.50	0	162	4	2/28	54.75	1	0	
8	Shweta Sinha	2021	2026	12	212	63	19.27	1	242	9	3/23	32.11	2	0	
9	Nicola Thrupp‡	2021	2021	3	90	50*	90.00	1	72	1	1/22	77.00	1	0	
10	Hinduja Venigalla	2021	2021	2	–	–	–	–	–	–	–	–	0	0	
11	Nikita Verma	2021	2021	2	10	10*	–	0	8	0	–	–	0	0	
12	Shraddha Bhandari‡	2021	2025	9	16	10	3.20	0	–	–	–	–	2	0	
13	Shirin Dias	2021	2025	4	7	3*	3.50	0	4	0	–	–	0	0	
14	Aashita Gupta	2024	2025	8	28	13	5.60	0	20	3	2/2	4.33	1	0	
15	Amina Diwan Ali	2024	2025	5	2	1*	1.00	0	42	0	–	–	0	0	
16	Shamma Diwan Ali†	2024	2026	15	13	4*	1.85	0	18	0	–	–	2	0	
17	Vidhi Gangwar	2024	2024	4	3	2	0.75	0	78	2	1/7	32.00	0	0	
18	Arussa Ilahi	2024	2026	17	149	27*	10.64	0	371	13	3/7	24.92	1	0	
19	Shabana Ilahi	2024	2026	12	21	12	3.00	0	–	–	–	–	4	0	
20	Pallavi Soni	2024	2024	2	1	1*	1.00	0	–	–	–	–	0	0	
21	Tripti Gore	2024	2025	6	12	8	2.40	0	28	1	1/26	62.00	1	0	
22	Sruthi Yenamandra	2024	2026	16	52	10	4.33	0	160	5	1/13	35.60	1	0	
23	Anjali Soni	2024	2024	1	1	1*	–	0	–	–	–	–	0	0	
24	Hajra Diwan Ali	2024	2024	3	5	4	2.50	0	42	3	2/16	14.66	0	0	
25	Attia Diwan Ali	2025	2026	11	9	5	1.50	0	168	4	1/6	61.25	2	0	
26	Smriti Kaneria‡	2025	2025	4	65	34	16.25	0	91	2	1/23	45.50	0	0	
27	Veera Redkar	2025	2025	4	83	41	27.66	0	6	0	–	–	1	0	
28	Ankita Mehta	2026	2026	3	15	7*	15.00	0	34	0	–	–	0	0	
29	Alix Brodin	2026	2026	9	102	43	12.75	0	48	0	–	–	1	0	
30	Beatrice Pierre	2026	2026	9	82	37	9.11	0	98	0	–	–	1	0	
31	Irma Vrignaud	2026	2026	8	99	32	16.50	0	–	–	–	–	2	0	
32	Mamta Mishra	2026	2026	2	–	–	–	–	–	–	–	–	0	0	
33	Shonaya Mehta	2026	2026	4	4	3	4.00	0	15	0	–	–	1	0	
34	Mysha Doshi	2026	2026	2	3	3	3.00	0	6	0	–	–	0	0	
35	Payal Kothar	2026	2026	4	10	6	3.33	0	60	4	2/16	20.00	0	0	
36	Peher Modi	2026	2026	3	4	4	1.33	0	42	0	–	–	0	0	
37	Rithika Rajesh	2026	2026	5	6	5	3.00	0	84	4	2/25	22.75	1	0	
