= List of Greece women Twenty20 International cricketers =

This is a list of Greece women Twenty20 International cricketers. A Women's Twenty20 International (WT20I) is an international cricket match between two representative teams. A T20I is played under the rules of Twenty20 cricket. In April 2018, the International Cricket Council (ICC) granted full international status to Twenty20 women's matches played between member sides from 1 July 2018 onwards. Greece women played their first WT20I on 9 September 2022 against Romania during the 2022 Women's Balkan Cup in Romania.

This list includes names of players who have played at least one T20I match for Greece. The list is arranged in the order in which each player won her first Twenty20 cap. Where more than one player won her first Twenty20 cap in the same match, those players are listed alphabetically by surname.

== Key ==
General

- ‡ – Captain
- † – Wicket-keeper
- First – Year of debut
- Last – Year of latest game
- Mat – Number of matches played

Batting

- Runs – Runs scored in career
- HS – Highest score
- Avg – Runs scored per dismissal
- * – Batsman remained not out
- 50 – Number of half centuries

Bowling

- Balls – Balls bowled in career
- Wkt – Wickets taken in career
- BBI – Best bowling in an innings
- Ave – Average runs per wicket

Fielding

- Ca – Catches taken
- St – Stumpings affected

== Players ==
Statistics are correct as of 29 August 2026.

Greece women T20I cricketers
General					Batting				Bowling				Fielding		Ref
No.	Name	First	Last	Mat	Runs	HS	Avg	50	Balls	Wkt	BBI	Ave	Ca	St	Ref
1	Aggeliki-ioanna Argyropoulou‡†	2022	2026	46	606	58	18.36	2	–	–	–	–	26	10	
2	Joanna Chytiri‡	2022	2022	3	13	13	13.00	0	–	–	–	–	0	0	
3	Sofia-nefeli Georgota‡	2022	2026	45	268	33*	10.30	0	807	35	3/4	21.00	12	0	
4	Aikaterini Gisdaki	2022	2024	8	18	8*	9.00	0	36	0	–	–	0	0	
5	Adamantia Makri	2022	2026	46	475	59	13.95	1	790	36	3/16	21.36	4	0	
6	Theodora Parisi-mesimeri†	2022	2026	31	54	8	6.00	0	–	–	–	–	6	1	
7	Maria Polimeri	2022	2026	45	174	15	7.90	0	96	7	3/36	13.57	6	0	
8	Aggeliki Savvani	2022	2026	40	247	28	10.73	0	657	37	6/5	16.67	9	0	
9f	Maria Syrioti‡	2022	2026	42	544	56	20.92	1	801	45	5/20	15.04	12	0	
10	Theopoula Skordili	2022	2026	8	8	5	2.66	0	45	5	2/7	4.60	2	0	
11	Maria-afroditi Vervitsioti	2022	2026	46	104	21*	5.20	0	653	36	3/8	17.83	9	0	
12	Eleni Grammenou	2022	2022	2	–	–	–	–	–	–	–	–	0	0	
13	Chrysoula Kanta	2023	2025	8	6	6*	–	0	–	–	–	–	1	0	
14	Sofia Varzakakou	2023	2023	6	–	–	–	–	–	–	–	–	0	0	
15	Dafni Vlachopoulou	2023	2024	21	68	11	8.50	0	143	8	2/10	16.25	9	0	
16	Evangellia Grammenou	2023	2024	8	6	3*	3.00	0	6	0	–	–	0	0	
17	Zoi Grammenou	2023	2023	1	–	–	–	–	6	1	1/9	9.00	0	0	
18	Vasiliki Moulinou	2023	2024	6	–	–	–	–	–	–	–	–	0	0	
19	Myrto Tornarou	2024	2024	3	–	–	–	–	–	–	–	–	0	0	
20	Nikoleta Dolianiti	2024	2025	10	3	2	1.50	0	–	–	–	–	3	0	
21	Eirini Tzanavari	2024	2024	4	0	0	0.00	0	–	–	–	–	1	0	
22	Elpida Kallous	2024	2026	23	72	32	6.54	0	230	10	2/13	24.60	2	0	
23	Thalia Koula	2024	2025	5	0	0	0.00	0	–	–	–	–	0	0	
24	Aikaterini Paramythioti	2024	2024	2	–	–	–	–	–	–	–	–	1	0	
25	Alekcandra Kourkoulo†	2025	2026	19	26	11	2.88	0	18	0	–	–	1	0	
26	Kapsokavadi Tereza	2025	2025	8	42	10	10.50	0	60	1	1/18	83.00	0	0	
27	Maria Penna	2026	2026	11	6	2*	1.50	0	12	0	–	–	0	0	
28	Nefeli Vitsou	2026	2026	1	–	–	–	–	–	–	–	–	0	0	
29	Randima Appuhangige	2026	2026	2	6	5	0	0	–	–	–	–	0	0	
30	Kyriaki Giannola	2026	2026	1	0	0*	–	0	–	–	–	–	0	0	
31	Lydia Katsimari	2026	2026	3	9	4	4.50	0	18	1	1/21	30.00	0	0	
32	Cristina Moschou	2026	2026	2	–	–	–	0	–	–	–	–	0	0	
