= List of Portugal women Twenty20 International cricketers =

This is a list of Portugal women Twenty20 International cricketers. A Twenty20 International is an international cricket match between two representative teams, each having Twenty20 International status, as determined by the International Cricket Council (ICC). A Twenty20 International is played under the rules of Twenty20 cricket.

This list includes all players who have played at least one T20I match for Portugal and is arranged in the order of debut appearance. Where more than one player won their first cap in the same match, those players are initially listed alphabetically at the time of debut.

Portugal women's team played their first WT20I match against Norway on 7 April 2025 during their tour of Portugal.

== Key ==
General

- ‡ – Captain
- † – Wicket-keeper
- First – Year of debut
- Last – Year of latest game
- Mat – Number of matches played

Batting

- Runs – Runs scored in career
- HS – Highest score
- 50 – Number of half centuries
- Avg – Runs scored per dismissal
- * – Batter remained not out

Bowling

- Wkt – Wickets taken in career
- BBI – Best bowling in an innings
- Ave – Average runs per wicket

Fielding

- Ca – Catches taken
- St – Stumpings affected

== List of players ==
Statistics are correct as of 6 September 2026.

Portugal women T20I cricketers
| General | | | | | Batting | | | | Bowling | | | | Fielding | | Ref |
| No. | Name | First | Last | Mat | Runs | HS | Avg | 50 | Balls | Wkt | BBI | Ave | Ca | St | Ref |
|---|---|---|---|---|---|---|---|---|---|---|---|---|---|---|---|
| 1 | Afsheen Ahmed | 2025 | 2026 | 9 | 1 | 1 | 0.33 | 0 | 89 | 4 | 4/9 | 28.25 | 0 | 0 | |
| 2 | Ishreet Cheema | 2025 | 2026 | 9 | 35 | 15* | 11.66 | 0 | 138 | 6 | 3/32 | 23.83 | 1 | 0 | |
| 3 | Jade de Figueiredo | 2025 | 2025 | 3 | 1 | 1 | 1.00 | 0 | 66 | 2 | 2/14 | 24.00 | 3 | 0 | |
| 4 | Sarah Collyer‡† | 2025 | 2026 | 9 | 210 | 52* | 52.50 | 2 | – | – | – | – | 5 | 0 | |
| 5 | Joanna Child | 2025 | 2025 | 3 | 2 | 2 | 2.00 | 0 | 4 | 0 | – | – | 0 | 0 | |
| 6 | Ishmeet Kaur | 2025 | 2025 | 3 | 0 | 0* | – | 0 | – | – | – | – | 1 | 0 | |
| 7 | Sanne Gerarda Luijke | 2025 | 2026 | 8 | 116 | 59* | 16.57 | 1 | – | – | – | – | 0 | 0 | |
| 8 | Mariam Waseem | 2025 | 2025 | 3 | 1 | 1 | 1.00 | 0 | 12 | 1 | 1/24 | 24.00 | 1 | 0 | |
| 9 | Beanca Maximo | 2025 | 2025 | 3 | 0 | 0 | 0.00 | 0 | 60 | 3 | 2/35 | 26.33 | 0 | 0 | |
| 10 | Gabriella Sequeira | 2025 | 2025 | 3 | 122 | 63* | 122.00 | 2 | 70 | 5 | 3/14 | 10.2 0 | 1 | 0 | |
| 11 | Kiona Sequeira | 2025 | 2026 | 9 | 157 | 37* | 26.16 | 0 | 162 | 2 | 1/17 | 72.50 | 2 | 0 | |
| 12 | Ashmeet Bhullar | 2026 | 2026 | 6 | 4 | 4 | 2.00 | 0 | – | – | – | – | 0 | 0 | |
| 13 | Maria Buccimazza | 2026 | 2026 | 6 | 1 | 1 | 0.33 | 0 | – | – | – | – | 0 | 0 | |
| 14 | Isabel Walker | 2026 | 2026 | 6 | 104 | 46* | 52.00 | 0 | 143 | 11 | 3/10 | 8.36 | 0 | 0 | |
| 15 | Matilda James | 2026 | 2026 | 6 | 27 | 9* | 9.00 | 0 | 102 | 9 | 4/14 | 10.66 | 2 | 0 | |
| 16 | Nayantara Raghunandan | 2026 | 2026 | 6 | 102 | 47 | 17.00 | 0 | 108 | 7 | 2/5 | 13.85 | 2 | 0 | |
| 17 | Ana Faria | 2026 | 2026 | 5 | 14 | 12 | 7.00 | 0 | 24 | 0 | – | – | 2 | 0 | |
