= List of Luxembourg women Twenty20 International cricketers =

This is a list of Luxembourg women Twenty20 International cricketers. A Twenty20 International (T20I) is an international cricket match between two representative teams. A Twenty20 International is played under the rules of Twenty20 cricket. In April 2018, the International Cricket Council (ICC) granted full international status to Twenty20 women's matches played between member sides from 1 July 2018 onwards.

The list is arranged in the order in which each player won her first Twenty20 cap. Where more than one player won her first Twenty20 cap in the same match, those players are listed alphabetically by surname.

== Key ==
General

- ‡ – Captain
- † – Wicket-keeper
- First – Year of debut
- Last – Year of latest game
- Mat – Number of matches played

Batting

- Runs – Runs scored in career
- HS – Highest score
- Avg – Runs scored per dismissal
- * – Batsman remained not out
- 50 – Number of half centuries

Bowling

- Balls – Balls bowled in career
- Wkt – Wickets taken in career
- BBI – Best bowling in an innings
- Ave – Average runs per wicket

Fielding

- Ca – Catches taken
- St – Stumpings affected

== List of players ==
Statistics are correct as of 23 August 2026.

Luxembourg women T20I cricketers
General					Batting				Bowling				Fielding		Ref
No.	Name	First	Last	Mat	Runs	HS	Avg	50	Balls	Wkt	BBI	Ave	Ca	St	Ref
1	Aarti Priya‡	2023	2026	25	131	21*	7.70	0	514	28	4/19	17.32	11	0	
2	Ashni Trivedi	2023	2024	4	0	0	0.00	0	–	–	–	–	0	0	
3	Georgia Brealey	2023	2026	15	206	54	15.84	1	258	7	2/19	39.42	4	0	
4	Francesca Ellingworth	2023	2024	8	18	10	4.50	0	78	0	–	–	0	0	
5	Vanajakshi Jagadeesh†	2023	2023	2	–	–	–	–	–	–	–	–	1	0	
6	Jagrat Dubey	2023	2026	25	133	33*	12.09	0	494	17	3/13	28.23	3	0	
7	Kerry Fraser‡	2023	2026	17	97	25*	10.17	0	157	7	2/17	26.14	3	0	
8	Khusboo Kandpal	2023	2026	21	125	25*	9.61	0	336	8	2/20	37.25	2	0	
9	Siofra Lawlor	2023	2026	21	348	62	18.31	1	162	8	2/8	18.75	4	0	
10	Navneet Bamrah	2023	2024	11	17	6	2.83	0	35	3	2/3	15.00	0	0	
11	Shivani Sati	2023	2026	21	29	7*	2.63	0	183	8	2/17	26.62	1	0	
12	Divya Kandpal	2023	2026	18	10	4*	2.00	0	166	6	2/6	28.83	1	0	
13	Maria Serfioti†	2023	2026	11	7	4*	7.00	0	–	–	–	–	2	1	
14	Pooja Agarwal†	2024	2026	20	202	65*	14.42	1	–	–	–	–	6	4	
15	Purnima Dhar	2024	2026	6	0	0*	–	0	–	–	–	–	0	0	
16	Katarina Mikjel	2024	2024	4	0	0	0.00	0	–	–	–	–	1	0	
17	Surbhi Sati	2024	2024	4	0	0	0.00	0	–	–	–	–	0	0	
18	Mounica Chowdary	2024	2025	6	10	4	2.00	0	60	0	–	–	0	0	
19	Elena Gehard	2025	2026	12	303	75*	33.66	3	21	0	–	–	2	0	
20	Penelope Neighbour	2025	2026	5	39	22*	39.00	0	96	6	3/38	28.66	0	0	
21	Sanah Abbas	2026	2026	8	10	5	5.00	0	–	–	–	–	0	0	
22	Sonal Sengar	2026	2026	5	–	–	–	–	12	0	–	–	0	0	
23	Stella Wykes-Templeman	2026	2026	3	–	–	–	–	5	–	–	–	0	0	
24	Clea Bultot	2026	2026	3	5	4	5.00	0	–	–	–	–	0	0	
