= List of Uzbekistan Twenty20 International cricketers =

This is a list of Uzbekistani Twenty20 International cricketers.

In April 2018, the ICC decided to grant full Twenty20 International (T20I) status to all its members. Therefore, all Twenty20 matches played between Uzbekistan and other ICC members after 1 January 2019 will have T20I status.

This list will comprise all members of the Uzbekistan cricket team who have played at least one T20I match. It is initially arranged in the order in which each player won his first Twenty20 cap. Where more than one player will win his first Twenty20 cap in the same match, those players will be listed alphabetically by surname (according to the name format used by Cricinfo).

Uzbekistan played their first match with T20I status on 22 June 2026 against Singapore during the 2026 Asia Pacific Cricket Champions Trophy.

== Key ==
General

- ‡ – Captain
- † – Wicket-keeper
- First – Year of debut
- Last – Year of latest game
- Mat – Number of matches played
- Win% – Winning percentage

Batting

- Runs – Runs scored in career
- HS – Highest score
- 100 – Centuries scored
- 50 – Half-centuries scored
- Avg – Runs scored per dismissal
- * – Batsman remained not out

Bowling

- Balls – Balls bowled in career
- Wkt – Wickets taken in career
- BBI – Best bowling in an innings
- Ave – Average runs per wicket

Fielding

- Ca – Catches taken
- St – Stumpings taken

== Players ==
Statistics are correct as of 26 June 2026.

Uzbekistan T20I cricketers
| General | | | | | Batting | | | | | Bowling | | | | Fielding | | Ref |
| No. | Name | First | Last | Mat | Runs | HS | Avg | 50 | 100 | Balls | Wkt | BBI | Ave | Ca | St | Ref |
|---|---|---|---|---|---|---|---|---|---|---|---|---|---|---|---|---|
| 1 | Luqman Hussan | 2026 | 2026 | 4 | 25 | 12 | 6.25 | 0 | 0 | 58 | 0 | – | – | 1 | 0 | |
| 2 | Amirxon Khakimov† | 2026 | 2026 | 3 | 19 | 15 | 6.33 | 0 | 0 | – | – | – | – | 0 | 0 | |
| 3 | Azizjon Khasanov | 2026 | 2026 | 4 | 0 | 0 | 0.00 | 0 | 0 | 60 | 2 | 2/20 | 53.00 | 1 | 0 | |
| 4 | Asadbek Musaev‡ | 2026 | 2026 | 4 | 17 | 9* | 8.50 | 0 | 0 | 36 | 1 | 1/15 | 74.00 | 0 | 0 | |
| 5 | Javohir Mustafoev | 2026 | 2026 | 4 | 1 | 1 | 1.00 | 0 | 0 | 54 | 3 | 2/39 | 27.66 | 0 | 0 | |
| 6 | Nikhil† | 2026 | 2026 | 4 | 60 | 35* | 20.00 | 0 | 0 | 18 | 1 | 1/26 | 26.00 | 0 | 0 | |
| 7 | Saif Ullah | 2026 | 2026 | 4 | 45 | 15 | 11.25 | 0 | 0 | – | – | – | – | 3 | 0 | |
| 8 | Shermukhammad Shermatov | 2026 | 2026 | 4 | 64 | 53 | 16.00 | 1 | 0 | 6 | 0 | – | – | 0 | 0 | |
| 9 | Syed Ahzamul Haq | 2026 | 2026 | 4 | 70 | 55* | 70.00 | 1 | 0 | 36 | 2 | 1/23 | 30.50 | 2 | 0 | |
| 10 | Golib Tuychiev | 2026 | 2026 | 2 | – | – | – | – | – | – | – | – | – | 0 | 0 | |
| 11 | Ulugbek Tuychiev | 2026 | 2026 | 3 | 0 | 0 | 0.00 | 0 | 0 | 12 | 1 | 1/10 | 25.00 | 2 | 0 | |
| 12 | Oybek Qudratov | 2026 | 2026 | 2 | 1 | 1* | 1.00 | 0 | 0 | 18 | 3 | 3/39 | 13.00 | 0 | 0 | |
| 13 | Kamron Xolmuradov | 2026 | 2026 | 1 | – | – | – | – | – | 12 | 0 | – | – | 0 | 0 | |
| 14 | Zain Amir | 2026 | 2026 | 1 | 0 | 0 | 0.00 | 0 | 0 | – | – | – | – | 0 | 0 | |
