= List of Norway women Twenty20 International cricketers =

This is a list of Norway women Twenty20 International cricketers. A Women's Twenty20 International (WT20I) is an international cricket match between two representative teams. A T20I is played under the rules of Twenty20 cricket. In April 2018, the International Cricket Council (ICC) granted full international status to Twenty20 women's matches played between member sides from 1 July 2018 onwards. Norway women played their first WT20I on 31 July against Austria during the 2019 France Women's T20I Quadrangular Series.

The list is arranged in the order in which each player won her first Twenty20 cap. Where more than one player won her first Twenty20 cap in the same match, those players are listed alphabetically by surname.

== Key ==
General

- ‡ – Captain
- † – Wicket-keeper
- First – Year of debut
- Last – Year of latest game
- Mat – Number of matches played

Batting

- Runs – Runs scored in career
- HS – Highest score
- Avg – Runs scored per dismissal
- * – Batsman remained not out
- 50 – Number of half centuries

Bowling

- Balls – Balls bowled in career
- Wkt – Wickets taken in career
- BBI – Best bowling in an innings
- Ave – Average runs per wicket

Fielding

- Ca – Catches taken
- St – Stumpings affected

== Players ==
Statistics are correct as of 30 August 2026.

Norway women T20I cricketers
General					Batting				Bowling				Fielding		Ref
No.	Name	First	Last	Mat	Runs	HS	Avg	50	Balls	Wkt	BBI	Ave	Ca	St	Ref
1	Aysha Waheed†	2019	2019	6	22	9	4.40	0	–	–	–	–	1	0	
2	Kiran Bhatti	2019	2019	6	25	9	4.16	0	–	–	–	–	0	0	
3	Farial Zia Safdar‡	2019	2022	15	88	20	6.28	0	310	15	3/9	15.26	2	0	
4	Hina Hussain	2019	2022	15	24	5	2.66	0	221	8	2/21	27.37	2	0	
5	Ramya Immadi‡	2019	2026	44	369	33	9.46	0	686	29	4/15	26.10	4	0	
6	Mutaiba Ansar‡	2019	2022	11	78	41*	9.75	0	72	3	2/26	26.33	2	0	
7	Nayab Alizai	2019	2024	12	99	27	8.25	0	–	–	–	–	4	0	
8	Shankeerthana Raveendrakumar	2019	2026	17	104	24*	10.40	0	125	3	1/1	43.00	3	0	
9	Razia Ali Zade‡	2019	2019	6	6	2	1.50	0	83	2	1/13	39.50	2	0	
10	Saira Ifzal	2019	2022	5	1	1	0.50	0	18	1	1/7	25.00	0	0	
11	Say Shee	2019	2019	5	0	0*	0.00	0	–	–	–	–	0	0	
12	Paw Shee	2019	2019	5	2	1	0.66	0	–	–	–	–	0	0	
13	Ayesha Hasan	2021	2026	37	520	54	16.25	1	48	2	1/26	42.50	3	0	
14	Amna Dastgir	2021	2022	4	9	5*	3.00	0	–	–	–	–	0	0	
15	Dulmini Gamage	2021	2024	9	20	7	4.00	0	102	2	1/15	68.00	0	0	
16	Anushka Gorad†	2021	2026	34	392	38	12.25	0	102	2	1/18	59.50	5	0	
17	Samruddhi Jadhav	2021	2021	1	3	3	3.00	0	–	–	–	–	0	0	
18	Pooja Kumari‡	2021	2023	13	49	12	4.45	0	205	10	3/10	17.20	2	0	
19	Paridhi Agrawal	2022	2025	21	22	6*	2.75	0	420	25	3/11	13.20	2	0	
20	Kristina Pirtskhalava	2022	2022	2	0	0	0.00	0	–	–	–	–	0	0	
21	Farima Safi	2022	2023	7	30	21	6.00	0	60	2	2/16	30.00	1	0	
22	Misbah Ifzal	2022	2026	5	3	3	1.00	0	–	–	–	–	0	0	
23	Bijeyata Kumari†	2022	2026	29	262	68*	10.48	1	–	–	–	–	6	4	
24	Sagana Kunaratnam	2022	2023	7	13	5*	4.33	0	–	–	–	–	1	0	
25	Lopamudra	2022	2026	24	29	12	2.41	0	272	7	2/15	43.71	2	0	
26	Mirab Razwan‡	2022	2026	33	79	13	4.15	0	557	33	6/7	17.42	9	0	
27	Raksha Jangir	2022	2022	1	0	0	0.00	0	–	–	–	–	0	0	
28	Mahnoor Akram	2022	2024	5	16	8	4.00	0	–	–	–	–	1	0	
29	Ananya Rautela	2022	2025	9	22	11	4.40	0	–	–	–	–	0	0	
30	Prachi Kumari	2023	2026	19	14	4	2.00	0	244	10	4/18	26.80	0	0	
31	Alina Aslam	2024	2026	25	101	23	7.76	0	539	22	3/23	23.00	4	0	
32	Nayab Razwan	2024	2026	19	127	18	7.47	0	128	5	2/2	28.20	2	0	
33	Vidya Viyala	2024	2026	21	99	12*	7.61	0	234	8	2/11	32.12	4	0	
34	Meenu Dhiman	2024	2024	1	2	2	2.00	0	–	–	–	–	0	0	
35	Purvi Kumari	2024	2025	4	9	7*	–	–	12	0	–	–	0	0	
36	Mirab Sajjad	2024	2026	10	64	27*	8.00	0	6	0	–	–	0	0	
37	Archana Vishwakarma	2025	2025	1	0	0	0.00	0	–	–	–	–	0	0	
38	Lizzie Stanfergin	2025	2026	3	4	3	2.00	0	16	0	–	–	0	0	
39	Nisha Kataria	2026	2026	1	–	–	–	–	–	–	–	–	0	0	
