= List of Turkey Twenty20 International cricketers =

This is a list of Turkish Twenty20 International cricketers.

In April 2018, the ICC decided to grant full Twenty20 International (T20I) status to all its members. Therefore, all Twenty20 matches played between Turkey and other ICC members after 1 January 2019 will be eligible for T20I status.

This list comprises all members of the Turkey cricket team who have played at least one T20I match. It is initially arranged in the order in which each player won his first Twenty20 cap. Where more than one player won his first Twenty20 cap in the same match, those players are listed alphabetically by surname (according to the name format used by Cricinfo).

Turkey played their first match with T20I status on 29 August 2019 against Luxembourg during the 2019 Romania T20 Cup.

== Key ==
General

- ‡ – Captain
- † – Wicket-keeper
- First – Year of debut
- Last – Year of latest game
- Mat – Number of matches played

Batting

- Runs – Runs scored in career
- HS – Highest score
- 50 – Half-centuries scored
- 100 – Centuries scored
- Avg – Runs scored per dismissal
- * – Batsman remained not out

Bowling

- Balls – Balls bowled in career
- Wkt – Wickets taken in career
- BBI – Best bowling in an innings
- Ave – Average runs per wicket

Fielding

- Ca – Catches taken
- St – Stumpings affected

== List of players ==
Statistics are correct as of 29 July 2026.

Turkey T20I cricketers
General					Batting					Bowling				Fielding		Ref
No.	Name	First	Last	Mat	Runs	HS	Avg	50	100	Balls	Wkt	BBI	Ave	Ca	St	Ref
1	Cengiz Akyüz	2019	2019	1	0	0	0.00	0	0	–	–	–	–	0	0	
2	Hasan Alta	2019	2019	3	1	1*	0.33	0	0	–	–	–	–	0	0	
3	Ahmet Dursak	2019	2019	4	4	3	1.00	0	0	52	0	–	–	2	0	
4	Hasan Helva	2019	2019	4	12	7	3.00	0	0	–	–	–	–	0	0	
5	Serdar Kansoy	2019	2019	4	2	2	0.50	0	0	6	0	–	–	0	0	
6	Serkan Kizilkaya	2019	2019	4	17	8	4.25	0	0	54	4	2/9	18.50	0	0	
7	Ali Köse	2019	2019	4	15	15	3.75	0	0	48	3	2/62	38.66	0	0	
8	Mehmat Sert	2019	2019	4	42	16	14.00	0	0	60	3	2/38	31.00	0	0	
9	Tunahan Turan	2019	2024	7	2	1	0.33	0	0	54	2	1/32	57.50	0	0	
10	Tunahan Ulutuna	2019	2022	6	5	4	1.25	0	0	6	0	–	–	0	0	
11	Recep Ulutuna†‡	2019	2019	4	3	1	0.75	0	0	6	0	–	–	2	0	
12	Osman Göker	2019	2019	1	1	1*	–	0	0	–	–	–	–	0	0	
13	Mehmet Koç	2019	2019	3	4	4*	2.00	0	0	–	–	–	–	0	0	
14	Gokhan Alta‡	2022	2025	12	126	28	10.50	0	0	203	10	3/25	33.50	1	0	
15	Cagri Bayraktar	2022	2022	3	26	12	8.66	0	0	–	–	–	–	0	0	
16	Ishak Elec	2022	2026	16	144	52	10.28	2	0	126	7	4/31	21.00	3	0	
17	Ilyas Ataullah	2022	2026	20	311	86	18.29	1	0	251	11	4/17	33.81	6	0	
18	Emi̇n Kuyumcu	2022	2022	3	17	10	5.66	0	0	18	0	–	–	0	0	
19	Romeo Nath†	2022	2024	12	158	38	15.80	0	0	–	–	–	–	5	0	
20	Shamsullah Ehsan	2022	2024	8	71	39	8.87	0	0	42	3	2/32	22.00	2	0	
21	Ali Turkmen‡	2022	2026	20	281	51*	21.61	2	0	390	14	3/21	33.57	10	0	
22	Mecit Ozturk‡	2022	2026	16	104	21	8.66	0	0	299	17	3/22	24.23	5	0	
23	Zafer Durmaz	2022	2025	8	69	49	9.85	0	0	66	3	2/20	26.00	4	0	
24	Hasan Cakir	2022	2022	2	0	0*	0.00	0	0	6	1	1/5	5.00	0	0	
25	Deniz Mutu	2022	2022	1	0	0*	–	0	0	–	–	–	–	0	0	
26	Muhammed Turkmen	2023	2024	6	39	23	9.75	0	0	60	3	3/7	24.33	0	0	
27	Muhammet Bicer	2023	2026	11	6	5	2.00	0	0	46	2	2/9	38.50	1	0	
28	Muhammet Kursat	2023	2023	4	0	0	0.00	0	0	30	2	2/17	17.50	0	0	
29	Murat Ipek	2023	2023	4	1	1	0.50	0	0	6	0	–	–	2	0	
30	Murat Yilmaz	2023	2026	13	25	6	2.77	0	0	113	5	2/24	36.80	7	0	
31	Batuhan Sahin†	2023	2023	3	6	5	3.00	0	0	–	–	–	–	0	0	
32	Cihan Altun	2023	2023	3	4	4	4.00	0	0	–	–	–	–	0	0	
33	Abdullah Khan Lodhi†	2024	2026	7	111	36	15.85	0	0	–	–	–	–	1	1	
34	Ibrahim Kursad Dalyan	2024	2026	12	152	44	16.88	0	0	174	5	1/11	48.80	3	0	
35	Serdar Burak Emir	2024	2026	11	54	42	5.40	0	0	126	6	2/17	42.50	1	0	
36	Hasan Yanar†	2025	2025	4	16	7*	16.00	0	0	–	–	–	–	2	0	
37	Ilyas Cetin	2025	2025	4	13	7	6.75	0	0	21	2	1/19	31.00	3	0	
38	Muhammad Fahad	2025	2026	12	380	120	31.66	2	1	216	10	3/33	26.50	3	0	
39	Mustafa Atmaca	2025	2026	5	11	5	5.50	0	0	79	1	1/14	156.00	0	0	
40	Esref Yaver	2025	2025	4	17	17	5.66	0	0	–	–	–	–	0	0	
41	Mustafa Balkis	2025	2026	8	105	35	13.12	0	0	8	0	–	–	0	0	
42	Ibrahim Altinoluk	2025	2025	2	0	0	0.00	0	0	–	–	–	–	0	0	
43	Furkan Tuskan	2026	2026	6	37	21	6.16	0	0	72	3	1/19	37.00	1	0	
44	Mertcan Filiz	2026	2026	7	11	7*	3.66	0	0	–	–	–	–	2	0	
45	Mertcan Donmez	2026	2026	6	40	14	13.33	0	0	–	–	–	–	0	0	
46	Omer Kutuk	2026	2026	5	24	9	24.00	0	0	–	–	–	–	0	0	
47	Gurkan Tuskan	2026	2026	5	25	12	6.25	0	0	72	4	2/20	24.25	0	0	
48	Abdulsamet Kanogullari	2026	2026	4	0	0	0.00	0	0	–	–	–	–	1	0	
49	Kayra Tetik	2026	2026	2	0	0*	–	0	0	2	0	–	–	0	0	

Note: The following match includes one or more missing catchers in the Cricinfo scorecard and hence statistics (as of 30 August 2019):

- vs. Romania (29 August 2019); 1 missing catcher
