= List of South Korea women Twenty20 International cricketers =

This is a list of South Korea women Twenty20 International cricketers. A Twenty20 International (T20I) is an international cricket match between two representative teams, each having Twenty20 International status, as determined by the International Cricket Council (ICC). A T20I is played under the rules of Twenty20 cricket.

This list includes all players who have played at least one T20I match and is initially arranged in the order of debut appearance. Where more than one player won their first cap in the same match, their names are initially listed alphabetically at the time of debut.

== Key ==
General

- ‡ – Captain
- † – Wicket-keeper
- First – Year of debut
- Last – Year of latest game
- Mat – Number of matches played

Batting

- Runs – Runs scored in career
- HS – Highest score
- Avg – Runs scored per dismissal
- * – Batsman remained not out
- 50 – Number of half centuries

Bowling

- Wkt – Wickets taken in career
- BBI – Best bowling in an innings
- Ave – Average runs per wicket

Fielding

- Ca – Catches taken
- St – Stumpings affected

== Players ==
Statistics are correct as of 13 October 2024.

South Korea women T20I cricketers
| General | | | | | Batting | | | | Bowling | | | | Fielding | | Ref |
| No. | Name | First | Last | Mat | Runs | HS | Avg | 50 | Balls | Wkt | BBI | Ave | Ca | St | Ref |
|---|---|---|---|---|---|---|---|---|---|---|---|---|---|---|---|
| 1 | Haliam Kwon | 2018 | 2024 | 12 | 18 | 6 | 2.00 | 0 | 96 | 3 | 1/14 | 47.00 | 4 | 0 | |
| 2 | Hee Jung Lee | 2018 | 2024 | 9 | 9 | 5 | 1.50 | 0 | 30 | 1 | 1/12 | 45.00 | 0 | 0 | |
| 3 | Hyejin Park | 2018 | 2024 | 10 | 17 | 13 | 2.83 | 0 | 81 | 4 | 2/14 | 25.50 | 1 | 0 | |
| 4 | Hyeji Jeong | 2018 | 2018 | 2 | 9 | 9 | 9.00 | 0 | – | – | – | – | 0 | 0 | |
| 5 | Kang Choi | 2018 | 2019 | 7 | 42 | 16 | 7.00 | 0 | – | – | – | – | 1 | 0 | |
| 6 | Mina Baek | 2018 | 2019 | 7 | 109 | 51* | 21.80 | 1 | 144 | 12 | 4/17 | 10.41 | 0 | 0 | |
| 7 | Seri Chang | 2018 | 2019 | 12 | 72 | 26 | 6.54 | 0 | 241 | 5 | 2/14 | 51.00 | 0 | 0 | |
| 8 | Seungmin Song‡ | 2018 | 2024 | 12 | 195 | 53 | 19.50 | 1 | 258 | 4 | 2/14 | 51.40 | 2 | 0 | |
| 9 | Sinae Kim† | 2018 | 2024 | 12 | 104 | 25 | 9.45 | 0 | – | – | – | – | 0 | 3 | |
| 10 | So Hyeon Park | 2018 | 2018 | 3 | – | – | – | – | 24 | 0 | – | – | 0 | 0 | |
| 11 | Su Jin Kim | 2018 | 2024 | 10 | 23 | 8 | 4.60 | 0 | – | – | – | – | 1 | 0 | |
| 12 | Jiyeon Park Jr | 2018 | 2024 | 11 | 3 | 1* | 1.00 | 0 | – | – | – | – | 0 | 0 | |
| 13 | Jiyeon Park | 2018 | 2024 | 11 | 67 | 17 | 7.44 | 0 | 217 | 5 | 2/25 | 37.20 | 3 | 0 | |
| 14 | Yebin Ka | 2018 | 2018 | 1 | – | – | – | – | – | – | – | – | 0 | 0 | |
| 15 | Han Won | 2024 | 2024 | 4 | 3 | 2* | 3.00 | 0 | – | – | – | – | 0 | 0 | |
| 16 | Jeon Myeong | 2024 | 2024 | 2 | – | – | – | – | 30 | 1 | 1/18 | 40.00 | 0 | 0 | |
| 17 | Kim Rang | 2024 | 2024 | 4 | 16 | 7 | 4.00 | 0 | 66 | 3 | 2/30 | 28.66 | 0 | 0 | |
| 18 | Jang Jin | 2024 | 2024 | 2 | 1 | 1 | 1.00 | 0 | – | – | – | – | 0 | 0 | |
| 19 | Lee Ra | 2024 | 2024 | 1 | 1 | 1 | 1.00 | 0 | – | – | – | – | 0 | 0 | |
