= List of Myanmar women Twenty20 International cricketers =

This is a list of Myanmar women Twenty20 International cricketers. A Twenty20 International is an international cricket match between two representative teams. A Twenty20 International is played under the rules of Twenty20 cricket. In April 2018, the International Cricket Council (ICC) granted full international status to Twenty20 women's matches played between member sides from 1 July 2018 onwards.

The list is arranged in the order in which each player won her first Twenty20 cap. Where more than one player won her first Twenty20 cap in the same match, their surnames are listed alphabetically.

== Key ==
General

- ‡ – Captain
- † – Wicket-keeper
- First – Year of debut
- Last – Year of latest game
- Mat – Number of matches played

Batting

- Runs – Runs scored in career
- HS – Highest score
- Avg – Runs scored per dismissal
- * – Batsman remained not out

Bowling

- Wkt – Wickets taken in career
- BBI – Best bowling in an innings
- Ave – Average runs per wicket

Fielding

- Ca – Catches taken
- St – Stumpings affected

== Players ==
Statistics are correct as of 9 June 2026.

Myanmar T20I cricketers
General					Batting				Bowling				Fielding		Ref
No.	Name	First	Last	Mat	Runs	HS	Avg	50	Balls	Wkt	BBI	Ave	Ca	St	Ref
1	Htet Aung	2019	2026	47	56	15	3.11	0	276	6	2/14	38.16	12	0	
2	Thae Thae Aung†	2019	2026	54	360	46	12.00	0	210	11	2/0	15.81	14	1	
3	Lin Lin Tun†‡	2019	2026	55	284	38	7.67	0	814	34	3/7	18.32	9	0	
4	Zin Kyaw	2019	2025	49	282	30	8.54	0	480	19	3/8	24.00	3	0	
5	Aye Moe†‡	2019	2024	13	5	3	1.00	0	6	0	–	–	0	0	
6	Khin Myat†	2019	2026	50	678	68*	16.95	2	48	6	4/11	5.16	4	1	
7	May San	2019	2026	56	323	47*	8.07	0	584	23	3/12	19.30	6	0	
8	Theint Soe‡	2019	2026	56	480	38	10.66	0	981	47	3/17	15.14	10	0	
9	Zar Thoon	2019	2025	20	56	17*	8.00	0	357	18	3/6	12.16	2	0	
10	Zar Win‡†	2019	2026	57	294	27*	7.53	0	836	38	3/14	15.89	12	2	
11	Zon Lin	2019	2026	55	843	58	20.56	2	649	36	6/10	15.50	14	0	
12	Htwe Neaung	2019	2023	10	4	3	1.33	0	–	–	–	–	0	0	
13	Yu Yu Mar	2019	2019	2	–	–	–	–	–	–	–	–	0	0	
14	Shwe Yee Win	2019	2026	25	10	10*	3.33	0	270	19	4/18	11.42	5	0	
15	Pan Ei Phyu	2023	2026	21	16	11*	5.33	0	214	9	4/13	21.66	2	0	
16	Thae Thae Po†	2023	2025	33	68	22	8.50	0	6	0	–	–	14	8	
17	Wa Thone Nadi	2023	2026	8	8	8*	8.00	0	126	9	4/13	8.33	2	0	
18	San Nyo Htwe	2023	2023	2	1	1*	–	0	6	0	–	–	0	0	
19	Thiri Sandar Shwe	2025	2026	6	4	4	1.33	0	–	–	–	–	1	0	
20	Moe Ei Phyu	2025	2026	8	37	20*	9.25	0	7	0	–	–	1	0	
