= List of Chile women Twenty20 International cricketers =

This is a list of Chilean women Twenty20 International cricketers. A Twenty20 International is an international cricket match between two representative teams, each having Twenty20 International status, as determined by the International Cricket Council (ICC). A Twenty20 International is played under the rules of Twenty20 cricket.

This list includes the names of all players who have played at least one T20I match and is initially arranged in the order of debut appearance. Where more than one player won their first cap in the same match, those players are initially listed alphabetically at the time of debut.

== Key ==
General

- ‡ – Captain
- † – Wicket-keeper
- First – Year of debut
- Last – Year of latest game
- Mat – Number of matches played

Batting

- Runs – Runs scored in career
- HS – Highest score
- Avg – Runs scored per dismissal
- * – Batsman remained not out
- 50 – Number of half centuries

Bowling

- Wkt – Wickets taken in career
- BBI – Best bowling in an innings
- Ave – Average runs per wicket

Fielding

- Ca – Catches taken
- St – Stumpings affected

== List of players ==
Statistics are correct as of 25 September 2026.

Chile women T20I cricketers
General					Batting				Bowling				Fielding		Ref
No.	Name	First	Last	Mat	Runs	HS	Avg	50	Balls	Wkt	BBI	Ave	Ca	St	Ref
1	Nicole Conejeros	2018	2019	9	99	30	14.14	0	168	9	2/8	17.88	0	0	
2	Janice Espinoza	2018	2018	5	1	1	0.50	0	96	2	1/12	60.50	2	0	
3	Francisca Galvez	2018	2019	9	16	10*	4.00	0	12	0	–	–	1	0	
4	Jeannette Gonzalez‡	2018	2019	9	35	13	5.00	0	169	4	1/5	38.25	0	0	
5	Juliette Guardia	2018	2019	7	10	8	2.00	0	–	–	–	–	0	0	
6	Jessica Miranda	2018	2026	16	137	32*	10.53	0	320	16	4/11	18.43	3	0	
7	Francisca Riquelme	2018	2018	5	18	10	3.60	0	–	–	–	–	0	0	
8	Yaritza Rodriguez†	2018	2026	14	65	14	4.64	0	82	4	3/23	28.75	1	0	
9	Maria Saavedra	2018	2019	5	3	3	1.50	0	42	1	1/37	47.00	1	0	
10	Ariel Tapia	2018	2018	2	1	1	1.00	0	–	–	–	–	0	0	
11	Arlet Uribe	2018	2018	4	7	7*	3.50	0	60	2	1/17	43.50	0	0	
12	Franchesca Moya†	2018	2026	15	100	32	7.69	0	–	–	–	–	3	1	
13	Tiara Pueye	2018	2026	8	24	9	4.00	0	–	–	–	–	0	0	
14	Marisol Cea	2018	2018	1	–	–	–	–	–	–	–	–	0	0	
15	Constanza Oyarce	2019	2026	12	17	11	1.70	0	174	7	1/7	45.85	1	0	
16	Camila Valdes‡	2019	2026	10	6	2	0.75	0	132	5	1/7	56.20	1	0	
17	Magdelena Pino	2019	2019	1	–	–	–	–	–	–	–	–	1	0	
18	Emilia Toro	2023	2023	3	1	1	0.50	0	24	0	–	–	0	0	
19	Florencia Martinez	2023	2026	8	3	2	0.37	0	94	0	–	–	0	0	
20	Yadhira Nunez†	2023	2023	3	0	0	0.00	0	–	–	–	–	1	0	
21	Esperanza Rubio	2023	2023	3	1	1	0.33	0	72	2	2/48	84.00	0	0	
22	Maria Salazar	2023	2026	6	11	10	1.83	0	–	–	–	–	0	0	
23	Sofia Araya	2023	2026	8	0	0*	0.00	0	23	1	1/25	42.00	0	0	
24	Constanza Vergara	2023	2023	2	0	0*	0.00	0	6	0	–	–	0	0	
25	Sofia Mardones	2023	2026	7	16	11	2.66	0	88	3	2/37	44.66	1	0	
26	Monserrat Montero	2026	2026	5	17	10	3.40	0	–	–	–	–	0	0	
27	Vanesa Pavez	2026	2026	1	0	0	0.00	0	–	–	–	–	0	0	
28	Nataly Perez	2026	2026	3	0	0*	0.00	0	–	–	–	–	0	0	
29	Ivonne Vildosola	2026	2026	2	0	0	0.00	0	–	–	–	–	0	0	
30	Alejandra Lagos	2026	2026	1	–	–	–	–	–	–	–	–	0	0	
31	Paz Ravanal	2026	2026	2	0	0*	–	0	–	–	–	–	0	0	
32	Alejandra Zuniga	2026	2026	2	0	0	0.00	0	12	0	–	–	0	0	
