= List of Mozambique women Twenty20 International cricketers =

This is a list of Mozambique women Twenty20 International cricketers. A Twenty20 International (T20I) is an international Twenty20 cricket match between two representative teams. A T20I is played under the rules of Twenty20 cricket. In April 2018, the International Cricket Council (ICC) granted full international status to Twenty20 women's matches played between member sides from 1 July 2018 onwards.

The list is arranged in the order in which each player won her first Twenty20 cap. Where more than one player won their first Twenty20 cap in the same match, their surnames are listed alphabetically.

== Key ==
General

- † – Wicket-keeper
- First – Year of debut
- Last – Year of latest game
- Mat – Number of matches played

Batting

- Runs – Runs scored in career
- HS – Highest score
- Avg – Average runs scored per dismissal
- 50 – Number of half centuries
- * – Batsman remained not out

Bowling

- Balls – Balls bowled in career
- Wkt – Wickets taken in career
- BBI – Best bowling in an innings
- Ave – Average runs conceded per wicket

Fielding

- Ca – Catches taken
- St – Stumpings taken

== Players ==
Statistics are correct as of 11 April 2026.

Mozambique women T20I cricketers
General					Batting				Bowling				Fielding		Ref
No.	Name	First	Last	Mat	Runs	HS	Avg	50	Balls	Wkt	BBI	Ave	Ca	St	Ref
1	Ameliana Arroz	2018	2018	2	1	1*	–	0	6	1	1/16	16.00	0	0	
2	Isabel Chuma	2018	2026	54	421	45*	11.69	0	415	24	4/21	16.41	3	0	
3	Palmira Cuinica‡	2018	2026	44	661	80*	16.94	3	756	35	3/4	18.22	16	0	
4	Fatima Guirrugo‡	2018	2022	15	181	68*	25.85	2	145	8	2/1	16.37	4	0	
5	Cristina Magaia‡†	2018	2026	57	496	52	11.27	1	364	35	4/24	8.00	13	2	
6	Maria Matine†‡	2018	2019	10	57	15	5.70	0	–	–	–	–	2	0	
7	Olga Matsolo‡	2018	2025	32	83	33*	5.92	0	553	26	4/13	19.69	5	0	
8	Eulalia Moiane‡	2018	2019	10	150	48	16.66	0	36	2	2/9	15.00	4	0	
9	Olga Mondlane†	2018	2026	37	389	71	10.51	1	318	16	2/7	14.06	4	0	
10	Cecelia Murrombe†	2018	2021	22	88	19*	4.88	0	135	7	4/4	26.42	3	0	
11	Angelica Salomao‡	2018	2026	44	110	27*	5.00	0	751	32	3/15	20.06	13	0	
12	Alcinda Cossa	2018	2021	18	95	54*	11.87	1	217	11	3/26	23.45	6	0	
13	Rosalia Haiong	2019	2026	40	149	18	5.73	0	173	6	1/3	25.00	2	0	
14	Jessica Sainda	2019	2019	8	20	9	4.00	0	–	–	–	–	1	0	
15	Paula Mazuze	2019	2021	9	27	14	3.37	0	150	12	5/19	10.50	1	0	
16	Atalia Monjane	2019	2019	7	39	17*	13.00	0	–	–	–	–	0	0	
17	Dalmira Tivane†	2019	2019	6	2	1	0.66	0	–	–	–	–	0	0	
18	Laura Chipanga	2019	2026	25	39	18	3.54	0	444	21	4/20	12.80	3	0	
19	Tania Chiracheque	2021	2021	5	22	13	4.40	0	–	–	–	–	0	0	
20	Alda Mangue	2021	2026	6	4	4	1.33	0	36	1	1/33	71.00	0	0	
21	Ofelia Moiane	2021	2021	5	7	3	1.75	0	–	–	–	–	0	0	
22	Helena Ponja	2021	2021	4	0	0*	0.00	0	–	–	–	–	1	0	
23	Sheila Guambe	2021	2022	6	15	15	15.00	0	–	–	–	–	3	0	
24	Dalciesia Duvane	2022	2022	6	29	11*	14.50	0	106	9	3/9	6.33	2	0	
25	Raquel Duvane†	2022	2023	9	17	12	5.66	0	–	–	–	–	8	–	
26	Abelina Moiane	2022	2026	23	108	27	6.00	0	6	0	–	–	1	0	
27	Irene Mulhovo	2022	2026	28	176	24	7.04	0	–	–	–	–	8	0	
28	Ruth Liasse	2022	2022	3	0	0	0.00	0	–	–	–	–	0	0	
29	Isabel Mabunda	2022	2023	6	24	11*	6.00	0	0	0	–	–	1	0	
30	Amelia Mundundo‡	2022	2026	30	183	45	8.31	0	347	23	3/7	12.39	2	0	
31	Fernanda Zavala	2022	2025	14	101	24	8.41	0	–	–	–	–	0	0	
32	Sochana Mujovo	2022	2022	1	–	–	–	–	18	2	2/17	8.50	0	0	
33	Regina Mazumba	2023	2026	17	67	17*	8.37	0	190	14	4/6	11.78	1	0	
34	Josefina Sonia	2024	2024	1	–	–	–	–	18	0	–	–	0	0	
35	Wisley Bucuane†	2025	2026	19	124	32	7.29	0	–	–	–	–	8	1	
36	Yudney Murrure	2025	2025	12	24	8	4.80	0	196	3	2/14	51.00	1	0	
37	Leonor Mandhate	2025	2025	2	–	–	–	–	30	2	1/9	16.00	1	0	
38	Delerosa Navingo	2025	2025	1	–	–	–	–	–	–	–	–	0	0	
