= Norway women's cricket team in Sweden in 2021 =

	Sweden	Norway
- Date: 29 August 2021 (Note: The series was played from 28–29 August, but only the third game had official T20I status. Sweden won the three-match series 3–0. The leading run-scorer for Sweden was Gunjan Shukla (32) and their leading wicket-taker was Neeha Kayani (7). The leading run-scorer for Norway was Farial Zia Safdar (31) and their leading wicket-takers were Faria Zia Safdar and Pooja Kumari (4 each).)
Captains	Gunjan Shukla	Pooja Kumari

Twenty20 International series
- Results: Sweden won the 1-match series 1–0
Most runs	Gunjan Shukla (15)	Ayesha Hasan (11)
Most wickets	Neeha Kayani (3)	Farial Zia Safdar (3); Pooja Kumari (3)

The Norway women's cricket team toured Sweden in August 2021 to play a three-match bilateral Twenty20 series, with the last of the matches having official Twenty20 International (T20I) status. The matches were played at the Guttsta Wicked Cricket Ground in Kolsva, and the T20I match was the first played by Sweden. On the first day of the tour, both teams shared a training day with Sweden's head coach Jonty Rhodes. Sweden won all three games in the series, including a low-scoring 2-wicket victory in their maiden women's T20I.

== Squads ==
Sweden	Norway
Gunjan Shukla (c); Meghana Alugunoolla (wk); Sai Devata; Cecillia Elmesioo; Sofie Elmesioo; Tuva Elmesioo; Daisy Holm; Johanna Jonsson (wk); Neeha Kayani; Sienna Linden; Signe Lundell; Kanchan Rana; Abhilasha Singh; Rashmi Somashekhar; Tzoulietta Zilfidou	Pooja Kumari (c); Paridhi Agrawal; Mutaiba Ansar; Amna Dastgir; Dulmini Gamage; Anushka Gorad (wk); Ayesha Hasan; Hina Hussain; Saira Ifzal; Ramya Immadi; Samruddhi Jadhav; Bijeyata Kumari (wk); Sangeerthana Raveendrakumar; Farial Zia Safdar

== 20-over series ==
=== 1st 20-over match ===
28 August 2021
11:00
Scorecard

Norway; 48/9 (20 overs)	v	Sweden; 49/4 (10.5 overs)
Bijeyata Kumari 8 (23); Rashmi Somashekhar 3/8 (3 overs)		Kanchan Rana 16 (16); Shangeerthana Raveendrakumar 3/7 (3 overs)

Sweden won by 6 wickets
Guttsta Wicked Cricket Ground, Kolsva
Umpires: Anukool Korde (Swe) and Nasir Rizvi (Swe)
Player of the match: Gunjan Shukla (Swe)

- Sweden won the toss and elected to field.

=== 2nd 20-over match ===
28 August 2021
14:00
Scorecard

Norway; 92/7 (20 overs)	v	Sweden; 93/4 (14.5 overs)
Farial Zia Safdar 29* (63); Neeha Kayani 2/11 (4 overs); Kanchan Rana 2/11 (4 overs)		Rashmi Somashekhar 21* (33); Hina Hussain 1/12 (2 overs)

Sweden won by 6 wickets
Guttsta Wicked Cricket Ground, Kolsva
Umpires: Anukool Korde (Swe) and Nasir Rizvi (Swe)
Player of the match: Kanchan Rana (Swe)

- Sweden won the toss and elected to field.

== Only T20I ==
29 August 2021
10:30
Scorecard

Norway; 52 (12 overs)	v	Sweden; 53/8 (12.1 overs)
Farial Zia Safdar 11* (28); Neeha Kayani 3/15 (3 overs)		Gunjan Shukla 15 (16); Farial Zia Safdar 3/9 (3.1 overs)

Sweden won by 2 wickets
Guttsta Wicked Cricket Ground, Kolsva
Umpires: Anukool Korde (Swe) and Nasir Rizvi (Swe)
Player of the match: Neeha Kayani (Swe)

- Sweden won the toss and elected to field.
- Meghana Alugunoolla, Sai Devata, Cecillia Elmesioo, Sofie Elmesioo, Neeha Kayani, Sienna Linden, Signe Lundell, Gunjan Shukla, Abhilasha Singh, Rashmi Somashekhar, Tzoulietta Zilfidou (Swe), Amna Dastgir, Dulmini Gamage, Anushka Gorad, Ayesha Hasan, Samruddhi Jadhav and Pooja Kumari (Nor) all made their T20I debuts.
