= List of France women Twenty20 International cricketers =

This is a list of France women Twenty20 International cricketers. A Women's Twenty20 International (WT20I) is an international cricket match between two representative teams. A T20I is played under the rules of Twenty20 cricket. In April 2018, the International Cricket Council (ICC) granted full international status to Twenty20 women's matches played between member sides from 1 July 2018 onwards. France women played their first WT20I on 31 July 2019 against Jersey during the 2019 France Women's T20I Quadrangular Series.

The list is arranged in the order in which each player won her first Twenty20 cap. Where more than one player won her first Twenty20 cap in the same match, those players are listed alphabetically by surname.

== Key ==
General

- ‡ – Captain
- † – Wicket-keeper
- First – Year of debut
- Last – Year of latest game
- Mat – Number of matches played

Batting

- Runs – Runs scored in career
- HS – Highest score
- Avg – Runs scored per dismissal
- * – Batsman remained not out
- 50 – Number of half centuries

Bowling

- Balls – Balls bowled in career
- Wkt – Wickets taken in career
- BBI – Best bowling in an innings
- Ave – Average runs per wicket

Fielding

- Ca – Catches taken
- St – Stumpings affected

== Players ==
Statistics are correct as of 14 March 2025.

France women T20I cricketers
| General | | | | | Batting | | | | Bowling | | | | Fielding | | Ref |
| No. | Name | First | Last | Mat | Runs | HS | Avg | 50 | Balls | Wkt | BBI | Ave | Ca | St | Ref |
|---|---|---|---|---|---|---|---|---|---|---|---|---|---|---|---|
| 1 | Emmanuelle Brelivet‡ | 2019 | 2023 | 17 | 66 | 38* | 7.33 | 0 | 138 | 10 | 5/14 | 10.60 | 5 | 0 | |
| 2 | Maëlle Cargouët† | 2019 | 2022 | 17 | 14 | 11 | 2.00 | 0 | – | – | – | – | 2 | 2 | |
| 3 | Emma Chancé | 2019 | 2021 | 12 | 15 | 5 | 3.00 | 0 | 114 | 1 | 1/13 | 125.00 | 3 | 0 | |
| 4 | Emmanuelle Chauveau | 2019 | 2019 | 6 | 72 | 32* | 36.00 | 0 | 12 | 1 | 1/14 | 14.00 | 2 | 0 | |
| 5 | Isabelle Costaz-Puyou | 2019 | 2019 | 5 | 54 | 34* | – | 0 | 116 | 7 | 3/14 | 11.57 | 1 | 0 | |
| 6 | Jennifer King | 2019 | 2021 | 15 | 188 | 46* | 17.09 | 0 | 126 | 7 | 2/7 | 12.71 | 5 | 0 | |
| 7 | Sabine Lieury | 2019 | 2019 | 5 | 15 | 10 | 7.50 | 0 | – | – | – | – | 0 | 0 | |
| 8 | Magali Marchello-Nizia | 2019 | 2022 | 11 | 9 | 4* | 9.00 | 0 | 42 | 0 | – | – | 2 | 0 | |
| 9 | Sophie Pécaud | 2019 | 2021 | 7 | 21 | 16 | 7.00 | 0 | 66 | 6 | 3/20 | 8.16 | 3 | 0 | |
| 10 | Tracy Rodriguez | 2019 | 2021 | 10 | 29 | 10* | 5.80 | 0 | 27 | 2 | 2/19 | 14.00 | 1 | 0 | |
| 11 | Irma Vrignaud† | 2019 | 2021 | 10 | 47 | 40 | 11.75 | 0 | – | – | – | – | 2 | 3 | |
| 12 | Cindy Bretéché | 2019 | 2022 | 17 | 3 | 3 | 0.75 | 0 | 309 | 13 | 2/16 | 18.61 | 3 | 0 | |
| 13 | Tara Britton | 2021 | 2023 | 29 | 235 | 68* | 11.19 | 1 | 34 | 1 | 1/18 | 48.00 | 9 | 0 | |
| 14 | Alix Brodin | 2021 | 2023 | 14 | 118 | 32 | 8.42 | 0 | 48 | 1 | 1/7 | 72.00 | 3 | 0 | |
| 15 | Thea Graham | 2021 | 2023 | 24 | 49 | 12 | 3.76 | 0 | 338 | 15 | 3/22 | 24.13 | 7 | 0 | |
| 16 | Poppy McGeown | 2021 | 2023 | 27 | 422 | 61* | 21.10 | 3 | 272 | 9 | 2/9 | 22.00 | 3 | 0 | |
| 17 | Marie Violleau‡ | 2021 | 2023 | 29 | 251 | 38 | 10.45 | 0 | 337 | 11 | 2/11 | 32.36 | 4 | 0 | |
| 18 | Sabine Baron | 2021 | 2021 | 1 | 1 | 1 | 1.00 | 0 | 6 | 0 | – | – | 0 | 0 | |
| 19 | Béatrice Pierre | 2021 | 2022 | 2 | – | – | – | – | – | – | – | – | 0 | 0 | |
| 20 | Lara Armas | 2021 | 2023 | 7 | 47 | 39 | 9.40 | 0 | – | – | – | – | 2 | 0 | |
| 21 | Ganesh Pooja | 2022 | 2023 | 16 | 136 | 32* | 12.36 | 0 | 24 | 1 | 1/28 | 28.00 | 5 | 0 | |
| 22 | Lydie Wykes-Templeman | 2022 | 2023 | 17 | 103 | 27 | 6.86 | 0 | 86 | 5 | 2/18 | 16.39 | 4 | 0 | |
| 23 | Blandine Verdon | 2022 | 2023 | 9 | 4 | 3* | 2.00 | 0 | 66 | 2 | 2/3 | 28.50 | 1 | 0 | |
| 24 | Louise Lestavel | 2022 | 2022 | 1 | – | – | – | – | – | – | – | – | 0 | 0 | |
| 25 | Krystal Lemoine | 2022 | 2022 | 1 | – | – | – | – | – | – | – | – | 0 | 0 | |
| 26 | Anika Bester | 2023 | 2023 | 16 | 85 | 17 | 7.72 | 0 | 299 | 20 | 4/20 | 12.05 | 5 | 0 | |
| 27 | Emma Patel | 2023 | 2023 | 16 | 69 | 19* | 6.90 | 0 | 216 | 12 | 2/12 | 19.41 | 0 | 0 | |
| 28 | Ines McKeon† | 2023 | 2023 | 16 | 354 | 94 | 23.60 | 2 | 51 | 2 | 1/19 | 30.00 | 0 | 0 | |
| 29 | Amy Seddon | 2023 | 2023 | 16 | 224 | 47* | 24.88 | 0 | 281 | 6 | 1/6 | 43.66 | 4 | 0 | |
| 30 | Prabhashi Mahawattage | 2023 | 2023 | 11 | 15 | 5* | 15.00 | 0 | 196 | 7 | 3/16 | 24.85 | 0 | 0 | |
| 31 | Fiona Cagnewa | 2025 | 2025 | 3 | 46 | 21 | 15.33 | 0 | – | – | – | – | 0 | 0 | |
| 32 | Nasheng Ihmeling | 2025 | 2025 | 3 | 14 | 13 | 4.66 | 0 | 12 | 0 | – | – | 0 | 0 | |
| 33 | Glenda Jaine† | 2025 | 2025 | 4 | 5 | 4* | 1.66 | 0 | – | – | – | – | 1 | 2 | |
| 34 | Vincente Kai | 2025 | 2025 | 4 | 19 | 8 | 6.33 | 0 | 78 | 0 | – | – | 1 | 0 | |
| 35 | Nyiatre Kaqea | 2025 | 2025 | 3 | 6 | 3 | 2.00 | 0 | – | – | – | – | 2 | 0 | |
| 36 | Armonie Konhu | 2025 | 2025 | 4 | 24 | 8 | 6.00 | 0 | 36 | 1 | 1/24 | 40.00 | 0 | 0 | |
| 37 | Kamea Moingoto | 2025 | 2025 | 4 | 18 | 14 | 4.50 | 0 | 79 | 4 | 2/10 | 13.25 | 1 | 0 | |
| 38 | Nellie Qaeze | 2025 | 2025 | 4 | 3 | 2 | 0.75 | 0 | 22 | 2 | 2/15 | 10.50 | 3 | 0 | |
| 39 | Stephanie Rokuad | 2025 | 2025 | 3 | 7 | 4* | 3.50 | 0 | 48 | 3 | 3/10 | 14.00 | 1 | 0 | |
| 40 | Rose Siwa | 2025 | 2025 | 3 | 3 | 3* | 1.50 | 0 | 26 | 1 | 1/13 | 27.00 | 0 | 0 | |
| 41 | Louise Wahmowe‡ | 2025 | 2025 | 4 | 5 | 3 | 1.66 | 0 | 84 | 9 | 3/24 | 9.22 | 0 | 0 | |
| 42 | Laurencia Fainicka | 2025 | 2025 | 2 | 0 | 0 | 0.00 | 0 | – | – | – | – | 0 | 0 | |
| 43 | Hmadren Wenehoua | 2025 | 2025 | 2 | 2 | 2 | 1.00 | 0 | – | – | – | – | 0 | 0 | |
| 44 | Virginie Nehoume | 2025 | 2025 | 1 | 0 | 0 | 0.00 | 0 | – | – | – | – | 0 | 0 | |
