= List of Tanzania women Twenty20 International cricketers =

This is a list of Tanzanian women Twenty20 International cricketers. A Twenty20 International (T20I) is an international cricket match between two representative teams, each having T20I status, as determined by the International Cricket Council (ICC). A T20I is played under the rules of Twenty20 cricket.

This list includes all players who have played at least one T20I match and is initially arranged in the order of debut appearance. Where more than one player won their first cap in the same match, those players are initially listed alphabetically at the time of debut.

== Key ==
General

- ‡ – Captain
- † – Wicket-keeper
- First – Year of debut
- Last – Year of latest game
- Mat – Number of matches played

Batting

- Runs – Runs scored in career
- HS – Highest score
- Avg – Runs scored per dismissal
- * – Batsman remained not out
- 50 – Half-centuries scored
- 100 – Centuries scored

Bowling

- Wkt – Wickets taken in career
- BBI – Best bowling in an innings
- Ave – Average runs per wicket

Fielding

- Ca – Catches taken
- St – Stumpings affected

== List of players ==
Statistics are correct as of 30 July 2026.

Tanzania women T20I cricketers
General					Batting					Bowling				Fielding		Ref
No.	Name	First	Last	Mat	Runs	HS	Avg	50	100	Balls	Wkt	BBI	Ave	Ca	St	Ref
1	Zinaida Jeremiah	2019	2022	19	19	8*	19.00	0	0	324	17	4/14	14.64	4	0	
2	Perice Kamunya	2019	2026	82	512	34*	10.89	0	0	1,719	96	4/7	12.35	24	0	
3	Fatuma Kibasu‡	2019	2025	69	1,623	127*	28.47	6	3	427	22	4/13	18.13	17	0	
4	Shufaa Mohamedi†	2019	2025	55	217	36	8.68	0	0	–	–	–	–	16	19	
5	Getrude Mushi	2019	2025	11	72	19	18.00	0	0	–	–	–	–	0	0	
6	Hudaa Omary‡	2019	2026	78	1,120	64	21.53	4	0	12	0	–	–	18	0	
7	Tabu Omary	2019	2025	27	99	33*	12.37	0	0	430	33	4/8	7.69	14	0	
8	Monica Pascal	2019	2023	30	471	61*	23.55	3	0	53	4	2/20	13.50	8	0	
9	Neema Pius‡	2019	2026	71	887	77*	17.3	2	0	307	14	2/6	19.71	30	0	
10	Nasra Saidi†	2019	2026	57	344	53*	12.74	1	0	1046	61	5/0	13.37	15	1	
11	Nuru Tindo	2019	2019	9	1	1*	–	0	0	188	12	4/8	11.66	1	0	
12	Saum Mtae	2019	2026	78	1,482	86*	22.45	6	0	119	7	1/3	14.42	25	0	
13	Tatu Shabani	2019	2022	3	3	3	3.00	0	0	90	3	2/10	15.00	3	0	
14	Winfrida Kevin	2019	2019	1	4	4*	–	0	0	6	0	–	–	0	0	
15	Catherine Kibuge†	2019	2019	2	–	–	–	–	–	–	–	–	–	0	0	
16	Nasra Mohamedi	2019	2025	16	114	27	11.40	0	0	6	0	–	–	3	0	
17	Sophia Jerome	2021	2026	50	117	25	9.75	0	0	861	48	4/13	13.02	6	0	
18	Linda Massawe†	2021	2026	13	36	26*	12.00	0	0	–	–	–	–	5	6	
19	Mwanaiddi Shakim	2021	2021	4	10	6	5.00	0	0	48	2	1/9	20.00	0	0	
20	Mwanaidi Swedy	2021	2024	25	193	87*	16.08	1	0	6	0	–	–	12	0	
21	Mwanamvua Ushanga	2021	2025	39	48	12	4.00	0	0	659	35	3/1	14.85	8	0	
22	Agnes Qwele	2022	2026	51	280	32	11.20	0	0	907	53	4/7	13.60	9	0	
23	Aisha Mohamed	2022	2026	32	198	21*	11.00	0	0	361	18	2/9	19.77	5	0	
24	Sheila Kizito	2022	2026	31	20	6*	2.22	0	0	578	14	2/11	35.64	7	0	
25	Josephine Ulrik	2022	2023	3	0	0	0.00	0	0	36	2	2/14	15.00	0	0	
26	Rahima Yahaya	2022	2022	3	0	0	0.00	0	0	12	1	1/11	11.00	0	0	
27	Mwapwani Mohamedi	2023	2023	3	–	–	–	–	–	36	1	1/29	34.00	0	0	
28	Sonia Muya	2023	2023	1	–	–	–	–	–	6	0	–	–	0	0	
29	Saumu Hussein†	2023	2026	18	34	11	3.77	0	0	–	–	–	–	6	4	
30	Mwajabu Salum	2023	2023	1	0	0*	–	0	0	18	2	2/6	3.00	0	0	
31	Saum Borakambi	2023	2026	11	3	3*	–	0	0	98	4	2/17	28.25	2	0	
32	Saidat Mbaki†	2024	2024	4	0	0	0.00	0	0	–	–	–	–	0	2	
33	Jenifer Kimaro	2025	2025	18	79	23	7.90	0	0	174	9	3/14	18.77	4	0	
34	Maria Massawe	2026	2026	6	0	0*	–	0	0	144	2	1/25	80.00	1	0	
