= List of Denmark women Twenty20 International cricketers =

This is a list of Denmark women Twenty20 International cricketers. A Women's Twenty20 International (WT20I) is an international cricket match between two representative teams. A T20I is played under the rules of Twenty20 cricket. In April 2018, the International Cricket Council (ICC) granted full international status to Twenty20 women's matches played between member sides from 1 July 2018 onwards. Denmark women played their first WT20I on 28 May 2022 against Sweden during the 2022 Nordic Cup.

The list is arranged in the order in which each player won her first Twenty20 cap. Where more than one player won their first Twenty20 cap in the same match, their names are listed alphabetically by surname.

== Key ==
General

- ‡ – Captain
- † – Wicket-keeper
- First – Year of debut
- Last – Year of latest game
- Mat – Number of matches played

Batting

- Runs – Runs scored in career
- HS – Highest score
- Avg – Runs scored per dismissal
- * – Batsman remained not out
- 50 – Number of half centuries

Bowling

- Balls – Balls bowled in career
- Wkt – Wickets taken in career
- BBI – Best bowling in an innings
- Ave – Average runs per wicket

Fielding

- Ca – Catches taken
- St – Stumpings affected

== Players ==
Statistics are correct as of 30 August 2026.

Denmark women T20I cricketers
General					Batting				Bowling				Fielding		Ref
No.	Name	First	Last	Mat	Runs	HS	Avg	50	Balls	Wkt	BBI	Ave	Ca	St	Ref
1	Ane Andersen	2022	2023	6	27	12	4.50	0	57	3	2/7	18.33	1	0	
2	Sigrid Buchwaldt	2022	2022	3	3	2*	3.00	0	66	2	1/19	28.50	0	0	
3	Luise Christensen	2022	2024	7	17	8	4.25	0	98	4	2/25	27.00	3	0	
4	Nita Dalgaard	2022	2026	41	326	34	11.64	0	732	34	3/10	17.58	4	0	
5	Tine Erichsen‡	2022	2026	23	276	40	13.14	0	54	4	3/41	20.75	4	0	
6	Divya Golechha	2022	2026	29	53	11	5.30	0	626	28	3/11	15.89	2	0	
7	Maria Karlsen†	2022	2026	37	256	30	9.48	0	–	–	–	–	13	4	
8	Annette Lyngby	2022	2022	2	11	10	5.50	0	–	–	–	–	0	0	
9	Ronja Nielsen	2022	2023	5	37	24	12.33	0	–	–	–	–	0	0	
10	Sofie Petersen	2022	2022	2	0	0	0.00	0	48	0	–	–	0	0	
11	Anne-Sofie Slebsager	2022	2026	33	140	23	10.00	0	416	22	4/16	23.95	9	0	
12	Natasha Holmgaard	2022	2022	2	3	3*	3.00	0	16	0	–	–	0	0	
13	Kristine Mosumgaard	2022	2022	2	0	0*	–	–	–	–	–	–	0	0	
14	Charlotte Pallesen	2022	2022	1	–	–	–	–	–	–	–	–	0	0	
15	Kathrine Brock-Nielsen‡	2023	2026	27	126	18*	6.63	0	155	5	2/25	42.60	8	0	
16	Emma Brogaard	2023	2023	1	–	–	–	–	–	–	–	–	0	0	
17	Signe Brunsgaard	2023	2023	3	27	21	9.00	0	36	2	2/13	19.50	0	0	
18	Line Leisner‡†	2023	2026	27	300	34*	13.04	0	–	–	–	–	8	1	
19	Sofie Ostergaard	2023	2026	34	96	13*	6.40	0	393	21	3/23	20.80	4	0	
20	Samanvita Vijay	2023	2024	2	0	0	0.00	0	–	–	–	–	0	0	
21	Camilla Ostergaard	2024	2026	29	91	23*	11.37	0	536	25	3/24	19.08	6	0	
22	Line Ostergaard‡	2024	2026	35	412	49*	14.20	0	630	29	4/10	19.00	15	0	
23	Kiaya Pandya	2024	2026	19	128	21*	8.53	0	–	–	–	–	3	0	
24	Luise Holmgaard	2024	2026	20	26	9*	8.66	0	140	7	2/4	19.00	6	0	
25	Filippa Molsgaard	2024	2024	1	–	–	–	–	–	–	–	–	1	0	
26	Anne Ostergaard	2024	2026	17	263	54	18.78	1	130	3	1/19	45.00	0	0	
27	Camilla Madsen	2024	2026	8	23	11*	11.50	0	132	3	1/15	79.33	0	0	
28	Sarah Hojholt†	2025	2026	15	172	30*	13.23	0	–	–	–	–	3	2	
29	Farhat Afroz	2025	2026	7	30	13	4.28	0	–	–	–	–	2	0	
30	Emilia Brock-Nielsen	2026	2026	2	–	–	–	–	–	–	–	–	0	0	
31	Sughra Ahmed	2026	2026	1	3	3	3.00	0	–	–	–	–	–	0	0
32	Samvida Munagala	2026	2026	4	1	1*	–	0	84	7	4/11	10.28	0	0	
33	Frida Larsen	2026	2026	3	59	45*	29.50	0	54	5	3/17	10.40	0	0	
34	Thea Larsen	2026	2026	3	40	26	13.33	0	66	3	2/27	21.66	1	0	
