= List of Malta Twenty20 International cricketers =

This is a list of Maltese Twenty20 International cricketers.

In April 2018, the ICC decided to grant full Twenty20 International (T20I) status to all its members. Therefore, all Twenty20 matches played between Malta and other ICC members after 1 January 2019 will be eligible for T20I status.

This list comprises all members of the Malta cricket team who have played at least one T20I match. It is initially arranged in the order in which each player won his first Twenty20 cap. Where more than one player won his first Twenty20 cap in the same match, those players are listed alphabetically by surname.

== Key ==
General

- ‡ – Captain
- † – Wicket-keeper
- First – Year of debut
- Last – Year of latest game
- Mat – Number of matches played

Batting

- Runs – Runs scored in career
- HS – Highest score
- Avg – Runs scored per dismissal
- * – Batsman remained not out
- 50 – Half-centuries scored
- 100 – Centuries scored

Bowling

- Balls – Balls bowled in career
- Wkt – Wickets taken in career
- BBI – Best bowling in an innings
- Ave – Average runs per wicket

Fielding

- Ca – Catches taken
- St – Stumpings affected

== List of players ==
Statistics are correct as of 23 May 2026.

Malta T20I cricketers
General					Batting					Bowling				Fielding		Ref
No.	Name	First	Last	Mat	Runs	HS	Avg	50	100	Balls	Wkt	BBI	Ave	Ca	St	Ref
1	George Agius	2019	2019	2	3	3	1.50	0	0	30	0	–	–	1	0	
2	Sujesh Appu	2019	2019	4	8	6	2.66	0	0	54	3	1/21	24.66	0	0	
3	Samuel Aquilina‡†	2019	2021	16	54	24	9.00	0	0	–	–	–	–	4	6	
4	Bikram Arora‡	2019	2024	56	826	66*	19.66	3	0	747	29	3/20	34.51	11	0	
5	Haroon Mughal	2019	2021	15	149	33	13.54	0	0	18	1	1/17	31.00	2	0	
6	Hasheem Shahzad	2019	2019	2	5	5	2.50	0	0	24	0	–	–	0	0	
7	Jurg Hirschi	2019	2019	4	37	13	9.25	0	0	66	3	2/13	30.33	0	0	
8	Niraj Khanna	2019	2023	24	238	37*	14.00	0	0	24	1	1/26	47.00	9	0	
9	Nowell Khosla‡	2019	2019	4	84	27	21.00	0	0	–	–	–	–	1	0	
10	David Marks	2019	2025	19	42	10	14.00	0	0	404	17	3/29	34.94	3	0	
11	Sumair Khan	2019	2019	1	7	7	7.00	0	0	–	–	–	–	0	0	
12	Michael Nazir	2019	2019	1	0	0	0.00	0	0	–	–	–	–	0	0	
13	Sean Byrne	2019	2019	2	3	3	1.50	0	0	–	–	–	–	0	0	
14	Gopal Chaturvedi	2019	2022	19	215	33	12.64	0	0	–	–	–	–	8	0	
15	Michael Goonetilleke	2019	2021	3	0	0*	0.00	0	0	–	–	–	–	1	0	
16	Ravinder Singh	2019	2021	7	57	34	14.25	0	0	36	1	1/36	72.00	1	0	
17	Waseem Abbas	2019	2025	61	180	28	8.57	0	0	1,272	75	5/37	22.52	16	0	
18	Suhrid Roy	2019	2021	2	4	2*	–	0	0	36	1	1/44	63.00	0	0	
19	Noshair Akhter	2020	2020	3	–	–	–	–	–	48	4	3/35	15.00	0	0	
20	Amar Sharma‡	2020	2025	42	228	34*	13.41	0	0	807	31	3/23	35.70	9	0	
21	Henrich Gericke†	2020	2022	21	541	91	27.05	4	0	–	–	–	–	8	1	
22	Salu Kanakalil	2020	2020	3	13	13*	–	0	0	48	4	4/31	18.50	1	0	
23	Samuel Stanislaus	2020	2024	40	627	62	20.22	1	0	19	1	1/4	30.00	8	0	
24	Varun Thamotharam‡	2020	2025	66	1,445	104*	26.27	9	1	933	44	3/22	28.34	17	0	
25	Zeeshan Khan‡	2020	2026	50	1086	115	23.10	5	1	–	–	–	–	16	0	
26	Bilal Muhammad	2021	2022	31	220	35*	14.66	0	0	710	40	4/10	19.65	7	0	
27	Ashok Bishnoi	2021	2023	12	11	4*	2.75	0	0	203	12	4/35	25.50	1	0	
28	Justin Shaju	2021	2024	23	14	4*	2.80	0	0	464	28	4/17	23.10	5	0	
29	Basil George	2021	2024	34	724	103*	22.62	3	1	93	1	1/18	159.00	8	0	
30	Aaftab Alam Khan†	2021	2025	29	293	71*	14.65	1	0	–	–	–	–	18	2	
31	Kalki Kumar	2021	2021	2	0	0*	–	0	0	30	0	–	–	0	0	
32	Deon Vosloo	2021	2021	2	38	23*	38.00	0	0	–	–	–	–	1	0	
33	Zoheb Malik	2021	2021	1	–	–	–	–	–	18	0	–	–	1	0	
34	Jojo Thomas	2021	2021	1	1	1	1.00	0	0	–	–	–	–	0	0	
35	Jaison Jerome	2022	2023	9	5	3	1.66	0	0	150	1	1/56	253.00	2	0	
36	Imran Ameer	2022	2026	35	367	46*	19.31	0	0	635	30	3/17	25.00	5	0	
37	Divyes Kumar	2022	2022	1	–	–	–	–	–	–	–	–	–	0	0	
38	Jitesh Patel	2022	2022	4	1	1	1.00	0	0	88	3	1/29	39.00	0	0	
39	Ryan Bastiansz	2022	2023	5	88	46	17.60	0	0	–	–	–	–	6	0	
40	Fanyan Mughal	2023	2024	24	279	56	13.28	1	0	459	22	3/15	26.40	6	0	
41	Fazil Rahman	2023	2023	6	7	6*	2.33	0	0	131	13	4/15	12.15	1	0	
42	Jaspal Singh	2023	2026	45	728	68*	21.41	4	0	193	6	1/8	42.66	22	0	
43	Darshit Patankar†	2023	2026	27	314	54	13.65	1	0	–	–	–	–	9	0	
44	Yash Singh	2023	2023	6	3	3	3.00	0	0	108	5	1/16	28.40	1	0	
45	Eldhose Mathew	2023	2025	27	219	46	11.52	0	0	341	19	4/39	24.42	11	0	
46	Chanjal Sudarsanan†	2023	2025	29	125	23*	10.41	0	0	12	0	–	–	32	2	
47	Waqas Ahmad	2023	2023	15	161	53*	20.12	1	0	345	23	5/11	17.95	7	0	
48	Gopal Thakur	2023	2024	13	224	62	22.40	1	0	–	–	–	–	2	0	
49	Jaswinder Singh	2023	2026	24	79	23*	6.07	0	0	268	18	3/17	21.11	5	0	
50	Vidusha Arachchige	2024	2024	4	5	5*	–	0	0	54	2	1/7	41.50	1	0	
51	Rockey Dianish†	2024	2026	24	408	58	18.54	1	0	18	1	1/15	23.00	8	0	
52	Sobu George	2025	2025	3	53	27	2650	0	0	6	0	–	–	1	0	
53	Niyas Pullariyil	2025	2025	2	17	15*	–	0	0	–	–	–	–	1	0	
54	Pintu Ghosh	2025	2025	1	–	–	–	–	–	6	0	–	–	0	0	
55	Mehboob Ali	2025	2026	20	519	93	25.95	3	0	371	19	3/9	25.84	4	0	
56	Shrijay Patel	2025	2026	20	158	31	11.28	0	0	–	–	–	–	8	0	
57	Priyan Pushparajan	2025	2026	21	604	103	31.78	4	1	289	13	3/34	28.23	13	0	
58	Jamsheed Kunnanchirakkal	2025	2025	4	4	2	2.00	0	0	–	–	–	–	3	0	
59	Muhammad Ajmal	2025	2026	14	60	17*	8.57	0	0	168	7	4/6	26.85	3	0	
60	Muhammad Qasim	2025	2026	12	311	84	31.10	2	0	282	17	3/13	17.23	4	0	
61	Gaurav Maithani	2025	2025	2	30	23*	30.00	0	0	–	–	–	–	0	0	
62	Ajin Soman	2026	2026	9	48	14	9.60	0	0	111	8	3/20	19.62	3	0	
63	Flynn Zahra†	2026	2026	11	88	24*	12.57	0	0	–	–	–	–	7	3	
64	Salman Sharjeel	2026	2026	5	3	3*	3.00	0	0	78	6	2/22	20.33	1	0	
65	Adil Latheef	2026	2026	3	–	–	–	–	–	54	2	1/11	28.50	1	0	
66	Jais Mathew	2026	2026	2	1	1*	–	0	0	36	3	2/23	14.00	2	0	
67	Michael Das	2026	2026	4	33	17	16.50	0	0	–	–	–	–	0	0	
68	Adnan Anwar	2026	2026	1	5	5*	–	0	0	–	–	–	–	0	0	
