= List of Eswatini Twenty20 International cricketers =

This is a list of Eswatini Twenty20 International cricketers. A Twenty20 International (T20I) is an international cricket match between two representative teams played under the rules of Twenty20 cricket.

In April 2018, the ICC decided to grant full T20I status to all its members. Therefore, all Twenty20 matches played between Eswatini and other ICC members after 1 January 2019 have the T20I status. Eswatini played their first T20I against Lesotho on 16 October 2021 during the 2021 ICC Men's T20 World Cup Africa Qualifier.

This list comprises names of all members of the Eswatini cricket team who have played at least one T20I match. It is initially arranged in the order in which each player won his first Twenty20 cap. Where more than one player won his first Twenty20 cap in the same match, those players are listed alphabetically by surname.

== Key ==
General

- ‡ – Captain
- † – Wicket-keeper
- First – Year of debut
- Last – Year of latest game
- Mat – Number of matches played

Batting

- Runs – Runs scored in career
- HS – Highest score
- Avg – Runs scored per dismissal
- * – Batsman remained not out
- 50 – Number of half centuries
- 100 – Number of centuries

Bowling

- Balls – Balls bowled in career
- Wkt – Wickets taken in career
- BBI – Best bowling in an innings
- Ave – Average runs per wicket

Fielding

- Ca – Catches taken
- St – Stumpings affected

== List of players ==
Statistics are correct as of 7 June 2026.

Eswatini T20I cricketers
General					Batting					Bowling				Fielding		Ref
No.	Name	First	Last	Mat	Runs	HS	Avg	50	100	Balls	Wkt	BBI	Ave	Ca	St	Ref
1	Frederick Chester	2021	2021	4	0	0*	0.00	0	0	30	2	2/33	25.50	0	0	
2	Christiaan Forbes	2021	2023	15	190	31	13.57	0	0	–	–	–	–	1	0	
3	Juber Ghadiyali	2021	2021	6	86	27*	17.20	0	0	74	5	3/24	14.60	0	0	
4	Junain Hansrod†	2021	2021	4	10	7	3.33	0	0	–	–	–	–	1	0	
5	Siphesihle Kubheka	2021	2026	17	35	8*	8.75	0	0	90	1	1/8	138.00	2	0	
6	Melusi Magagula‡	2021	2026	38	205	21*	10.25	0	0	634	42	4/10	20.09	4	0	
7	Muhammad Amin	2021	2024	13	169	80	14.08	2	0	84	1	1/21	118.00	2	0	
8	Naeem Gull‡†	2021	2022	13	189	63*	15.75	1	0	–	–	–	–	3	0	
9	Shehzad Patel†	2021	2023	9	95	30*	13.57	0	0	–	–	–	–	1	0	
10	Umair Qasim	2021	2026	40	303	50*	10.82	1	0	686	34	3/14	25.47	17	0	
11	Joseph Wright	2021	2024	6	32	19*	8.00	0	0	34	0	–	–	1	0	
12	Mancoba Jele	2021	2026	42	139	16	5.79	0	0	551	31	3/23	25.58	11	0	
13	Lindinkosi Zulu†	2021	2022	6	30	20	6.00	0	0	–	–	–	–	1	0	
14	Buhle Dlamini	2022	2024	6	14	10	2.80	0	0	–	–	–	–	0	0	
15	Loyiso Dlamini	2022	2024	9	27	14	6.75	0	0	12	0	–	–	0	0	
16	Eric Phiri	2022	2026	23	168	44*	8.84	0	0	–	–	–	–	2	0	
17	Delisa Malinga	2022	2022	3	4	3	1.33	0	0	36	5	4/28	11.20	0	0	
18	Musa Twala†	2022	2022	5	4	2*	2.00	0	0	12	0	–	–	2	1	
19	Hamilton Nyakatawa	2022	2022	6	78	29	13.00	0	0	–	–	–	–	–	–	
20	Haris Rashid	2022	2025	20	239	38	14.05	0	0	317	12	2/26	34.66	6	0	
21	Tahir Patel	2022	2022	6	41	15	8.20	0	0	122	2	1/20	70.00	3	0	
22	Wandile Dlamini	2022	2022	8	30	12	4.28	0	0	36	1	1/20	70.00	0	0	
23	Adil Butt‡	2022	2026	36	1,355	88*	41.06	10	3	678	40	3/4	22.20	11	0	
24	Dinesh Polpitiya	2022	2022	6	0	0	0.00	0	0	84	4	3/15	28.00	0	0	
25	Tarun Sandeep†	2022	2026	27	566	68	24.60	3	0	–	–	–	–	15	3	
26	Phumlani Sibiya	2022	2022	1	3	3*	–	0	0	–	–	–	–	0	0	
27	Mohammed Alamgir	2022	2026	23	199	33	19.90	0	0	113	8	2/12	22.37	0	0	
28	Faizalmahmed Patel	2023	2026	7	14	7*	14.00	0	0	84	2	1/18	71.00	0	0	
29	Hujeifa Jangariya†	2023	2026	12	241	54	24.10	1	0	–	–	–	–	5	2	
30	Wesley Landman	2023	2023	3	9	5	3.00	0	0	24	2	2/37	24.50	0	0	
31	Safwan Barediya	2023	2023	2	19	17	9.50	0	0	–	–	–	–	1	0	
32	Aadil Bhaiyat†	2024	2024	5	31	21	6.20	0	0	–	–	–	–	4	0	
33	Benele Mngoma	2024	2026	4	5	3*	5.00	0	0	34	2	1/1	24.00	0	0	
34	Rohan Sandeep	2024	2026	18	115	24	10.45	0	0	254	6	2/3	40.33	2	0	
35	Het Patel	2024	2026	5	1	1*	1.00	0	0	–	–	–	–	2	0	
36	Thandolwethu Dlamini	2024	2024	5	–	–	–	–	–	12	0	–	–	1	0	
37	Maaz Patel	2024	2024	1	–	–	–	–	–	–	–	–	–	0	0	
38	Sibusiso Jele	2024	2026	12	40	16	6.66	0	0	–	–	–	–	2	0	
39	Minhaz Khojbariya	2024	2026	21	190	46*	12.66	0	0	354	18	4/17	24.94	5	0	
40	Javid Suleman	2024	2024	5	53	35	13.25	0	0	–	–	–	–	1	0	
41	Minhaj Kulfiwala	2025	2025	3	22	21	7.33	0	0	5	2	2/1	0.50	0	0	
42	Kamrul Hasan	2025	2025	3	59	49	19.66	0	0	–	–	–	–	0	0	
43	Saqib Anwar	2026	2026	11	9	4	1.50	0	0	198	10	3/29	23.00	4	0	
44	Banele Mngomezulu	2026	2026	2	–	–	–	–	–	6	0	–	–	0	0	
45	Muhammad Farooq	2026	2026	6	211	63	35.16	1	0	126	4	2/15	27.00	2	0	
46	Sufyan Naseeb	2026	2026	7	55	38	9.16	0	0	–	–	–	–	8	0	
47	Jihad Hossain	2026	2026	3	–	–	–	–	–	15	3	2/15	8.33	1	0	
