= List of Mali women Twenty20 International cricketers =

This is a list of Mali women Twenty20 International cricketers. A Twenty20 International (T20I) is an international cricket match between two representative teams played under the rules of Twenty20 cricket. In April 2018, the International Cricket Council (ICC) granted full international status to Twenty20 women's matches played between member sides from 1 July 2018 onwards. The Mali women's team made their T20I debut on 18 June 2019 against Rwanda in Kigali during the 2019 Kwibuka Women's T20 Tournament.

The list is arranged in the order in which each player won her first Twenty20 cap. Where more than one player won her first Twenty20 cap in the same match, those players are listed alphabetically by surname.

== Key ==
General

- ‡ – Captain
- † – Wicket-keeper
- First – Year of debut
- Last – Year of latest game
- Mat – Number of matches played

Batting

- Runs – Runs scored in career
- HS – Highest score
- Avg – Runs scored per dismissal
- * – Batsman remained not out
- 50 – Number of half centuries

Bowling

- Wkt – Wickets taken in career
- BBI – Best bowling in an innings
- Ave – Average runs per wicket

Fielding

- Ca – Catches taken
- St – Stumpings affected

== Players ==
Statistics are correct as of 23 June 2019.

General					Batting				Bowling				Fielding		Ref
No.	Name	First	Last	Mat	Runs	HS	Avg	50	Balls	Wkt	BBI	Ave	Ca	St	Ref
1	Ramata Cisse	2019	2019	6	3	2	0.50	0	18	0	–	–	0	0	
2	Balkissa Coulibaly	2019	2019	6	2	1	0.40	0	60	0	–	–	0	0	
3	Maimouna Coulibaly	2019	2019	5	7	4	1.40	0	–	–	–	–	0	0	
4	Sirantou Kagnassy	2019	2019	6	2	1	0.33	0	–	–	–	–	0	0	
5	Tenin Konate	2019	2019	6	8	4	1.60	0	80	0	–	–	0	0	
6	Aicha Kon	2019	2019	6	1	1	0.20	0	78	2	1/26	66.50	0	0	
7	Mariam Samake	2019	2019	6	16	9*	4.00	0	–	–	–	–	0	0	
8	Aissata Sangare†	2019	2019	6	2	1	0.33	0	–	–	–	–	0	0	
9	Youma Sangare‡	2019	2019	6	0	0*	0.00	0	76	1	1/54	151.00	0	0	
10	Oumou Sow	2019	2019	6	3	3	0.66	0	42	0	–	–	0	0	
11	Nafoutouma Traore	2019	2019	1	0	0	0.00	0	–	–	–	–	0	0	
12	Coumba Diarra	2019	2019	3	0	0	0.00	0	–	–	–	–	0	0	
13	Mala Djiguiba	2019	2019	2	1	1	0.50	0	24	0	–	–	0	0	
14	Mariam Sidibe	2019	2019	1	0	0	0.00	0	–	–	–	–	0	0	
