= List of Malawi women Twenty20 International cricketers =

This is a list of Malawi women Twenty20 International cricketers. A Twenty20 International is an international cricket match between two representative teams, each having Twenty20 International status, as determined by the International Cricket Council (ICC). A Twenty20 International is played under the rules of Twenty20 cricket.

This list includes all players who have played at least one T20I match and is initially arranged in the order of debut appearance. Where more than one player won their first cap in the same match, those players are initially listed alphabetically at the time of debut.

== Key ==
General

- ‡ – Captain
- † – Wicket-keeper
- First – Year of debut
- Last – Year of latest game
- Mat – Number of matches played

Batting

- Runs – Runs scored in career
- HS – Highest score
- Avg – Runs scored per dismissal
- * – Batsman remained not out
- 50 – Number of half centuries

Bowling

- Wkt – Wickets taken in career
- BBI – Best bowling in an innings
- Ave – Average runs per wicket

Fielding

- Ca – Catches taken
- St – Stumpings affected

== Players ==
Statistics are correct as of 17 June 2026.

General					Batting				Bowling				Fielding		Ref
No.	Name	First	Last	Mat	Runs	HS	Avg	50	Balls	Wkt	BBI	Ave	Ca	St	Ref
1	Tricia Chabila	2018	2024	11	0	0*	0.00	0	114	2	2/22	69.00	0	0	
2	Meria Dailesi†	2018	2019	12	78	26	9.75	0	–	–	–	–	6	0	
3	Dalida Dzimau	2018	2019	12	61	14	8.71	0	147	10	4/27	12.50	1	0	
4	Shalon Dzimau†	2018	2019	13	42	10	3.81	0	49	1	1/25	63.00	3	0	
5	Nellie Gamaliyele	2018	2023	9	23	13	7.66	0	96	4	2/13	28.25	1	0	
6	Shahida Hussein‡	2018	2019	13	120	34*	12.00	0	270	14	3/13	16.07	3	0	
7	Thandi Katunga	2018	2019	4	1	1*	1.00	0	6	0	–	–	0	0	
8	Triphonia Luka†	2018	2025	33	238	41*	7.67	0	216	18	5/16	10.94	8	1	
9	Mary Mabvuka‡†	2018	2018	6	48	17	8.00	0	48	4	2/13	10.50	1	0	
10	Tadala Mpandakwaya	2018	2025	20	135	34	11.25	0	57	2	1/8	38.50	3	0	
11	Brenda Ndipo	2018	2019	12	30	11	4.28	0	168	8	2/23	18.37	2	0	
12	Dalitso Ndipo	2018	2018	5	60	21*	30.00	0	–	–	–	–	1	0	
13	Vanessa Phiri‡	2018	2026	27	30	9*	3.33	0	381	28	4/9	12.75	2	0	
14	Sarah Tambala	2018	2018	1	0	0	0.00	0	–	–	–	–	0	0	
15	Chimwemwe Juma	2019	2019	7	5	3	0.83	0	126	7	2/6	15.00	2	0	
16	Promise Chiwaya	2019	2019	4	6	4	2.00	0	–	–	–	–	0	0	
17	Dyna Rice	2019	2019	5	29	19	5.80	0	18	1	1/19	36.00	1	0	
18	Lekeleni Mbendera	2019	2019	4	28	22	7.00	0	–	–	–	–	1	0	
19	Sophina Chinawa	2023	2026	34	313	33*	9.78	0	95	5	2/6	17.00	10	0	
20	Ketrina Chingaipe‡	2023	2025	19	55	10	4.58	0	298	15	3/16	17.60	1	0	
21	Lidia Dimba‡	2023	2025	26	370	74*	16.81	1	455	23	3/15	16.08	9	0	
22	Sugeni Kananji	2023	2026	35	491	51	17.53	1	602	38	3/7	12.34	14	0	
23	Mercy Kudimba†	2023	2024	10	58	16*	11.60	0	–	–	–	–	3	1	
24	Febbe Malefula	2023	2025	15	177	62*	14.75	1	–	–	–	–	5	0	
25	Lucy Malino	2023	2026	33	24	8	2.66	0	724	41	4/3	14.34	3	0	
26	Allinafe Alfonso	2024	2026	18	37	11*	3.36	0	24	1	1/15	15.00	5	0	
27	Praise Maziya	2024	2026	31	251	29*	10.91	0	473	28	3/2	14.46	8	0	
28	Christina Bwanali	2025	2026	21	16	5*	1.77	0	152	8	2/7	16.75	1	0	
29	Euless Chiralile‡†	2025	2026	20	117	20*	6.88	0	–	–	–	–	6	6	
30	Esther Richard	2025	2025	8	20	7	5.00	0	80	4	2/5	21.00	2	0	
31	Eva Kabwere	2025	2025	11	8	3	2.00	0	216	14	4/21	12.57	2	0	
32	Angela Lumbe†	2025	2026	11	101	42	10.10	0	–	–	–	–	4	1	
33	Lucy Bigula	2025	2025	3	31	24	10.33	0	36	1	1/23	37.00	0	0	
34	Bridget Kasinja	2026	2026	12	2	1*	1.00	0	192	5	2/7	29.80	1	0	
35	Caroleen Mangulama	2026	2026	8	9	3	2.25	0	–	–	–	–	0	0	
36	Elizabeth Mapisa	2026	2026	3	–	–	–	–	12	1	1/14	14.00	0	0	
37	Monica Ndipo	2026	2026	6	17	8	3.40	0	–	–	–	–	0	0	
38	Winnie Matabwa	2026	2026	3	1	1	0.50	0	42	1	1/8	58.00	0	0	
39	Lucy Wesley	2026	2026	7	15	6	3.75	0	28	3	1/3	16.00	1	0	
40	Sphiwe Frank	2026	2026	3	1	1	0.50	0	–	–	–	–	0	0	
41	Alinafe Kawirawira	2026	2026	3	5	4*	–	0	–	–	–	–	1	0	
