= Associate international cricket in 2022 =

International cricket season

The 2022 Associate international cricket season was from approximately May to September 2022. All official twenty over matches between Associate members of the ICC were eligible to have full Twenty20 International (T20I) or Women's Twenty20 International (WT20I) status, as the International Cricket Council (ICC) granted T20I status to matches between all of its members from 1 July 2018 (women's teams) and 1 January 2019 (men's teams). The season included all T20I/WT20I cricket series mostly involving ICC Associate members, that were played in addition to series covered in International cricket in 2022. In July 2022, Cambodia, the Ivory Coast and Uzbekistan were all awarded Associate Membership of the ICC.

== Season overview ==
Men's international tours
Start date	Home team	Away team	Results [Matches]
Start date	Home team	Away team	T20I
7 May 2022	Denmark	Finland	2–1 [3]
20 May 2022	Guernsey	Jersey	0–3 [3]
4 June 2022	Austria	Hungary	1–1 [3]
11 June 2022	Belgium	Malta	3–0 [3]
11 June 2022	Luxembourg	Switzerland	1–1 [2]
19 June 2022	Finland	Estonia	2–0 [2]
24 June 2022	Bulgaria	Serbia	4–0 [4]
28 June 2022	Singapore	Malaysia	1–2 [3]
2 July 2022	Singapore	Papua New Guinea	1–1 [3]
8 July 2022	Serbia	Bulgaria	2–1 [3]
29 July 2022	Eswatini	Mozambique	0–6 [6]
11 August 2022	(Oman) Bahrain	Kuwait	1–4 [5]
25 August 2022	Kenya	Nepal	2–3 [5]
Men's international tournaments
Start date	Tournament		Winners
29 April 2022	2022 Spain Tri-Nation Series		Spain
10 May 2022	(Malta) 2022 Valletta Cup		Romania
9 June 2022	2022 Germany Tri-Nation Series		Germany
28 June 2022	(Belgium) 2022 ICC Men's T20 World Cup Europe Qualifier C		Denmark
29 June 2022 (Note: The series was played without official T20I status.)	2022 Namibia T20 Tri-Nation Series		Namibia
2 July 2022	2022 Malaysia Quadrangular Series		Malaysia
8 July 2022	(Czech Republic) 2022 Central Europe Cup		Czech Republic
11 July 2022	(Zimbabwe) 2022 ICC Men's T20 World Cup Global Qualifier B		Zimbabwe
12 July 2022	(Finland) 2022 ICC Men's T20 World Cup Europe Qualifier A		Italy
24 July 2022	(Finland) 2022 ICC Men's T20 World Cup Europe Qualifier B		Austria
13 August 2022 (Note: Matches that were played at the Baltic Cup 2022 did not have T20I status as only Estonia were members of the ICC.)	(Estonia) 2022 Baltic Cup		Latvia
20 August 2022	(Oman) 2022 Asia Cup Qualifier		Hong Kong

Women's international tours
Start date	Home team	Away team	Results [Matches]
Start date	Home team	Away team	WT20I
16 May 2022	Nepal	Uganda	2–3 [5]
25 June 2022 (Note: Jersey also won an unofficial T20 after the two WT20I matches.)	Jersey	Guernsey	2–0 [2]
27 June 2022	Netherlands	Namibia	3–2 [6]
2 July 2022	Germany	Namibia	0–3 [3]
8 July 2022	Singapore	Malaysia	0–3 [3]
29 July 2022	Eswatini	Mozambique	0–6 [6]
17 August 2022	Austria	Italy	0–5 [5]
27 August 2022	Romania	Malta	0–3 [3]
Women's international tournaments
Start date	Tournament		Winners
5 May 2022	2022 France Women's T20I Quadrangular Series		Jersey
27 May 2022	(Sweden) 2022 Women's Nordic Cup		Sweden
9 June 2022	(Rwanda) 2022 Kwibuka Women's T20 Tournament		Tanzania
17 June 2022	(Malaysia) 2022 ACC Women's T20 Championship		United Arab Emirates
9 September 2022	(Romania) 2022 Women's Balkan Cup		Greece

== April ==
=== 2022 Spain Tri-Nation Series ===
Pos	Team	Pld	W	L	NR	Pts	NRR
1	Spain	4	3	1	0	6	1.597
2	Guernsey	4	2	2	0	4	−0.678
3	Norway	4	1	3	0	2	−0.916

Source: ESPN Cricinfo

Round-robin
No.	Date	Team 1	Captain 1	Team 2	Captain 2	Venue	Result
T20I 1513	29 April	Guernsey	Josh Butler	Norway	Khizer Ahmed	Desert Springs Cricket Ground, Almería	Norway by 37 runs
T20I 1514	30 April	Spain	Christian Munoz-Mills	Norway	Khizer Ahmed	Desert Springs Cricket Ground, Almería	Spain by 51 runs
T20I 1515	30 April	Guernsey	Josh Butler	Norway	Khizer Ahmed	Desert Springs Cricket Ground, Almería	Guernsey by 8 wickets
T20I 1516	30 April	Spain	Lorne Burns	Guernsey	Josh Butler	Desert Springs Cricket Ground, Almería	Spain by 8 wickets
T20I 1517	1 May	Spain	Lorne Burns	Guernsey	Josh Butler	Desert Springs Cricket Ground, Almería	Guernsey by 8 wickets
T20I 1518	1 May	Spain	Lorne Burns	Norway	Khizer Ahmed	Desert Springs Cricket Ground, Almería	Spain by 41 runs

== May ==
=== 2022 France Women's Quadrangular Series ===
Pos	Team	Pld	W	L	NR	Pts	NRR
1	Jersey	4	4	0	0	8	2.855
2	France	4	2	2	0	4	0.688
3	Austria	4	2	2	0	4	−0.575
4	Spain	4	0	4	0	0	−2.700

Source: ESPN Cricinfo

Round-robin
No.	Date	Team 1	Captain 1	Team 2	Captain 2	Venue	Result
WT20I 1068	5 May	France	Marie Violleau	Jersey	Chloe Greechan	Dreux Sport Cricket Club, Dreux	Jersey by 7 wickets
WT20I 1069	5 May	Austria	Gandhali Bapat	Spain	Elspeth Fowler	Dreux Sport Cricket Club, Dreux	Austria by 35 runs
WT20I 1070	6 May	Jersey	Chloe Greechan	Spain	Elspeth Fowler	Dreux Sport Cricket Club, Dreux	Jersey by 67 runs
WT20I 1071	6 May	Austria	Gandhali Bapat	Jersey	Chloe Greechan	Dreux Sport Cricket Club, Dreux	Jersey by 70 runs
WT20I 1072	7 May	France	Marie Violleau	Jersey	Chloe Greechan	Dreux Sport Cricket Club, Dreux	Jersey by 6 wickets
WT20I 1073	7 May	Austria	Jo-Antoinette Stiglitz	Spain	Elspeth Fowler	Dreux Sport Cricket Club, Dreux	Austria by 48 runs
WT20I 1074	8 May	France	Marie Violleau	Spain	Elspeth Fowler	Dreux Sport Cricket Club, Dreux	France by 66 runs
WT20I 1075	8 May	France	Marie Violleau	Austria	Jo-Antoinette Stiglitz	Dreux Sport Cricket Club, Dreux	France by 59 runs

=== Finland in Denmark ===
Nordic Cup – T20I series
No.	Date	Home captain	Away captain	Venue	Result
T20I 1519	7 May	Frederik Klokker	Nathan Collins	Svanholm Park, Brøndby	Finland by 3 wickets
T20I 1520	7 May	Frederik Klokker	Nathan Collins	Svanholm Park, Brøndby	Denmark by 138 runs
T20I 1521	8 May	Frederik Klokker	Nathan Collins	Svanholm Park, Brøndby	Denmark by 53 runs

=== 2022 Valletta Cup ===
Pos	Team	Pld	W	L	NR	Pts	NRR
1	Malta	5	5	0	0	10	1.014
2	Romania	5	3	2	0	6	1.498
3	Czech Republic	5	3	2	0	6	1.237
4	Hungary	5	3	2	0	6	−0.251
5	Gibraltar	5	1	4	0	2	−1.439
6	Bulgaria	5	0	5	0	0	−2.115

Source: ESPN Cricinfo

Round-robin
No.	Date	Team 1	Captain 1	Team 2	Captain 2	Venue	Result
T20I 1522	10 May	Malta	Bikram Arora	Gibraltar	Avanish Pai	Marsa Sports Club, Marsa	Malta by 5 wickets
T20I 1523	10 May	Malta	Bikram Arora	Hungary	Abhijeet Ahuja	Marsa Sports Club, Marsa	Malta by 45 runs
T20I 1524	10 May	Gibraltar	Avanish Pai	Hungary	Abhijeet Ahuja	Marsa Sports Club, Marsa	Hungary by 4 wickets
T20I 1525	11 May	Malta	Bikram Arora	Romania	Ramesh Satheesan	Marsa Sports Club, Marsa	Malta by 5 wickets
T20I 1526	11 May	Czech Republic	Arun Ashokan	Gibraltar	Avanish Pai	Marsa Sports Club, Marsa	Czech Republic by 40 runs
T20I 1527	11 May	Bulgaria	Prakash Mishra	Hungary	Abhijeet Ahuja	Marsa Sports Club, Marsa	Hungary by 5 runs
T20I 1528	12 May	Malta	Amar Sharma	Czech Republic	Arun Ashokan	Marsa Sports Club, Marsa	Malta by 2 runs
T20I 1529	12 May	Bulgaria	Prakash Mishra	Czech Republic	Arun Ashokan	Marsa Sports Club, Marsa	Czech Republic by 88 runs
T20I 1530	12 May	Hungary	Abhijeet Ahuja	Romania	Ramesh Satheesan	Marsa Sports Club, Marsa	Hungary by 6 wickets
T20I 1531	13 May	Bulgaria	Prakash Mishra	Gibraltar	Avanish Pai	Marsa Sports Club, Marsa	Gibraltar by 21 runs
T20I 1532	13 May	Czech Republic	Arun Ashokan	Romania	Ramesh Satheesan	Marsa Sports Club, Marsa	Romania by 26 runs
T20I 1533	13 May	Bulgaria	Prakash Mishra	Romania	Ramesh Satheesan	Marsa Sports Club, Marsa	Romania by 8 wickets
T20I 1534	14 May	Czech Republic	Arun Ashokan	Hungary	Abhijeet Ahuja	Marsa Sports Club, Marsa	Czech Republic by 7 wickets
T20I 1535	14 May	Gibraltar	Avanish Pai	Romania	Ramesh Satheesan	Marsa Sports Club, Marsa	Romania by 8 wickets
T20I 1536	14 May	Malta	Bikram Arora	Bulgaria	Prakash Mishra	Marsa Sports Club, Marsa	Malta by 6 wickets
Play-offs
No.	Date	Team 1	Captain 1	Team 2	Captain 2	Venue	Result
T20I 1537	15 May	Bulgaria	Prakash Mishra	Gibraltar	Avanish Pai	Marsa Sports Club, Marsa	Bulgaria by 5 wickets
T20I 1538	15 May	Czech Republic	Arun Ashokan	Hungary	Abhijeet Ahuja	Marsa Sports Club, Marsa	Czech Republic by 70 runs
T20I 1539	15 May	Malta	Bikram Arora	Romania	Ramesh Satheesan	Marsa Sports Club, Marsa	Romania by 9 runs

=== Uganda women in Nepal ===
WT20I series
No.	Date	Home captain	Away captain	Venue	Result
WT20I 1076	16 May	Rubina Chhetry	Concy Aweko	Tribhuvan University International Cricket Ground, Kirtipur	Uganda by 12 runs
WT20I 1077	17 May	Rubina Chhetry	Concy Aweko	Tribhuvan University International Cricket Ground, Kirtipur	Uganda by 1 wicket
WT20I 1078	19 May	Rubina Chhetry	Concy Aweko	Tribhuvan University International Cricket Ground, Kirtipur	Uganda by 6 wickets
WT20I 1079	20 May	Rubina Chhetry	Concy Aweko	Tribhuvan University International Cricket Ground, Kirtipur	Nepal by 15 runs
WT20I 1080	21 May	Rubina Chhetry	Concy Aweko	Tribhuvan University International Cricket Ground, Kirtipur	Nepal by 33 runs

=== Jersey in Guernsey ===
Inter-Insular T20I series
No.	Date	Home captain	Away captain	Venue	Result
T20I 1542	20 May	Josh Butler	Charles Perchard	College Field, Saint Peter Port	Jersey by 37 runs
T20I 1543	21 May	Josh Butler	Charles Perchard	King George V Sports Ground, Castel	Jersey by 60 runs
T20I 1545	21 May	Josh Butler	Charles Perchard	King George V Sports Ground, Castel	Jersey by 37 runs

=== 2022 Women's Nordic Cup ===
Pos	Team	Pld	W	L	NR	Pts	NRR
1	Sweden	5	5	0	0	10	3.341
2	Norway	4	1	3	0	2	−2.594
3	Denmark	3	0	3	0	0	−2.350

Source: ESPN Cricinfo

Round-robin
No.	Date	Team 1	Captain 1	Team 2	Captain 2	Venue	Result
WT20I 1083	27 May	Sweden	Gunjan Shukla	Norway	Mutaiba Ansar	Guttsta Wicked Cricket Ground, Kolsva	Sweden by 8 wickets
WT20I 1084	27 May	Sweden	Gunjan Shukla	Norway	Mutaiba Ansar	Guttsta Wicked Cricket Ground, Kolsva	Sweden by 9 wickets
WT20I 1085	28 May	Sweden	Gunjan Shukla	Denmark	Tine Erichsen	Guttsta Wicked Cricket Ground, Kolsva	Sweden by 71 runs
WT20I 1087	28 May	Denmark	Tine Erichsen	Norway	Mutaiba Ansar	Guttsta Wicked Cricket Ground, Kolsva	Norway by 34 runs
WT20I 1088	29 May	Sweden	Gunjan Shukla	Denmark	Tine Erichsen	Guttsta Wicked Cricket Ground, Kolsva	Sweden by 5 wickets
WT20I 1089	29 May	Sweden	Gunjan Shukla	Norway	Mutaiba Ansar	Guttsta Wicked Cricket Ground, Kolsva	Sweden by 9 wickets

== June ==
=== Hungary in Austria ===
T20I series
No.	Date	Home captain	Away captain	Venue	Result
T20I 1548	4 June	Razmal Shigiwal	Khaibar Deldar	Seebarn Cricket Ground, Lower Austria	Austria by 105 runs
T20I 1549	4 June	Razmal Shigiwal	Khaibar Deldar	Seebarn Cricket Ground, Lower Austria	No result
T20I 1550	5 June	Razmal Shigiwal	Khaibar Deldar	Seebarn Cricket Ground, Lower Austria	Hungary by 4 wickets

=== 2022 Kwibuka Women's T20 Tournament ===
Pos	Team	Pld	W	L	NR	Pts	NRR
1	Tanzania	7	7	0	0	14	2.415
2	Kenya	7	6	1	0	12	1.366
3	Uganda	7	5	2	0	10	3.097
4	Rwanda	7	4	3	0	8	0.529
5	Nigeria	7	3	4	0	6	−0.474
6	Brazil	7	2	5	0	4	−2.576
7	Botswana	7	1	6	0	2	−1.448
8	Germany	7	0	7	0	0	−2.782

Source: ESPN Cricinfo

Round-robin
No.	Date	Team 1	Captain 1	Team 2	Captain 2	Venue	Result
WT20I 1093	9 June	Rwanda	Marie Bimenyimana	Uganda	Concy Aweko	Gahanga International Cricket Stadium, Kigali	Uganda by 6 wickets
WT20I 1094	9 June	Botswana	Laura Mophakedi	Kenya	Queentor Abel	IPRC Cricket Ground, Kigali	Kenya by 35 runs
WT20I 1095	9 June	Brazil	Roberta Moretti Avery	Nigeria	Blessing Etim	Gahanga International Cricket Stadium, Kigali	Nigeria by 8 wickets
WT20I 1096	10 June	Kenya	Queentor Abel	Uganda	Concy Aweko	Gahanga International Cricket Stadium, Kigali	Kenya by 3 wickets
WT20I 1097	10 June	Botswana	Laura Mophakedi	Tanzania	Fatuma Kibasu	IPRC Cricket Ground, Kigali	Tanzania by 57 runs
WT20I 1098	10 June	Rwanda	Marie Bimenyimana	Brazil	Roberta Moretti Avery	Gahanga International Cricket Stadium, Kigali	Rwanda by 36 runs
WT20I 1099	10 June	Germany	Anuradha Doddaballapur	Nigeria	Blessing Etim	IPRC Cricket Ground, Kigali	Nigeria by 5 wickets
WT20I 1100	11 June	Brazil	Roberta Moretti Avery	Germany	Anuradha Doddaballapur	Gahanga International Cricket Stadium, Kigali	Brazil by 8 runs
WT20I 1101	11 June	Tanzania	Fatuma Kibasu	Uganda	Concy Aweko	IPRC Cricket Ground, Kigali	Tanzania by 5 wickets
WT20I 1102	11 June	Rwanda	Marie Bimenyimana	Kenya	Queentor Abel	Gahanga International Cricket Stadium, Kigali	Kenya by 4 wickets
WT20I 1103	11 June	Botswana	Laura Mophakedi	Nigeria	Blessing Etim	IPRC Cricket Ground, Kigali	Nigeria by 7 wickets
WT20I 1104	12 June	Kenya	Queentor Abel	Tanzania	Fatuma Kibasu	Gahanga International Cricket Stadium, Kigali	Tanzania by 38 runs
WT20I 1105	12 June	Rwanda	Marie Bimenyimana	Germany	Janet Ronalds	IPRC Cricket Ground, Kigali	Rwanda by 52 runs
WT20I 1106	12 June	Botswana	Laura Mophakedi	Brazil	Roberta Moretti Avery	Gahanga International Cricket Stadium, Kigali	Brazil by 5 wickets
WT20I 1107	12 June	Nigeria	Blessing Etim	Uganda	Concy Aweko	IPRC Cricket Ground, Kigali	Uganda by 9 wickets
WT20I 1108	13 June	Germany	Christina Gough	Tanzania	Fatuma Kibasu	Gahanga International Cricket Stadium, Kigali	Tanzania by 58 runs
WT20I 1109	14 June	Kenya	Queentor Abel	Nigeria	Blessing Etim	Gahanga International Cricket Stadium, Kigali	Kenya by 42 runs
WT20I 1110	14 June	Rwanda	Marie Bimenyimana	Tanzania	Fatuma Kibasu	IPRC Cricket Ground, Kigali	Tanzania by 5 wickets
WT20I 1111	14 June	Botswana	Laura Mophakedi	Germany	Christina Gough	Gahanga International Cricket Stadium, Kigali	Botswana by 17 runs
WT20I 1112	14 June	Brazil	Roberta Moretti Avery	Uganda	Concy Aweko	IPRC Cricket Ground, Kigali	Uganda by 84 runs
WT20I 1113	15 June	Rwanda	Marie Bimenyimana	Botswana	Laura Mophakedi	Gahanga International Cricket Stadium, Kigali	Rwanda by 6 wickets
WT20I 1114	15 June	Germany	Christina Gough	Uganda	Concy Aweko	IPRC Cricket Ground, Kigali	Uganda by 167 runs
WT20I 1115	15 June	Nigeria	Blessing Etim	Tanzania	Fatuma Kibasu	Gahanga International Cricket Stadium, Kigali	Tanzania by 7 wickets
WT20I 1116	15 June	Brazil	Roberta Moretti Avery	Kenya	Queentor Abel	IPRC Cricket Ground, Kigali	Kenya by 102 runs
WT20I 1117	16 June	Botswana	Laura Mophakedi	Uganda	Concy Aweko	Gahanga International Cricket Stadium, Kigali	Uganda by 9 wickets
WT20I 1118	16 June	Rwanda	Marie Bimenyimana	Nigeria	Blessing Etim	IPRC Cricket Ground, Kigali	Rwanda by 23 runs
WT20I 1119	16 June	Germany	Christina Gough	Kenya	Queentor Abel	Gahanga International Cricket Stadium, Kigali	Kenya by 44 runs
WT20I 1120	16 June	Brazil	Roberta Moretti Avery	Tanzania	Fatuma Kibasu	IPRC Cricket Ground, Kigali	Tanzania by 10 wickets
Play-offs
No.	Date	Team 1	Captain 1	Team 2	Captain 2	Venue	Result
WT20I 1125	17 June	Botswana	Laura Mophakedi	Germany	Christina Gough	Gahanga International Cricket Stadium, Kigali	Germany by 6 wickets
WT20I 1126	17 June	Brazil	Roberta Moretti Avery	Nigeria	Blessing Etim	Gahanga International Cricket Stadium, Kigali	Nigeria by 30 runs
WT20I 1131	18 June	Rwanda	Marie Bimenyimana	Uganda	Concy Aweko	Gahanga International Cricket Stadium, Kigali	Uganda by 8 wickets
WT20I 1132	18 June	Kenya	Queentor Abel	Tanzania	Fatuma Kibasu	Gahanga International Cricket Stadium, Kigali	Tanzania by 44 runs

=== 2022 Germany Tri-Nation Series ===
Pos	Team	Pld	W	L	NR	Pts	NRR
1	Germany	4	3	1	0	6	0.781
2	Austria	4	3	1	0	6	−0.152
3	Sweden	4	0	4	0	0	−0.626

Source: ESPN Cricinfo

Round-robin
No.	Date	Team 1	Captain 1	Team 2	Captain 2	Venue	Result
T20I 1553	9 June	Germany	Venkatraman Ganesan	Austria	Razmal Shigiwal	Bayer Uerdingen Cricket Ground, Krefeld	Germany by 54 runs
T20I 1555	9 June	Germany	Venkatraman Ganesan	Sweden	Abhijit Venkatesh	Bayer Uerdingen Cricket Ground, Krefeld	Germany by 4 wickets
T20I 1556	10 June	Germany	Venkatraman Ganesan	Austria	Razmal Shigiwal	Bayer Uerdingen Cricket Ground, Krefeld	Austria by 38 runs
T20I 1557	10 June	Austria	Razmal Shigiwal	Sweden	Abhijit Venkatesh	Bayer Uerdingen Cricket Ground, Krefeld	Austria by 3 runs
T20I 1560	11 June	Austria	Razmal Shigiwal	Sweden	Abhijit Venkatesh	Bayer Uerdingen Cricket Ground, Krefeld	Austria by 1 run
T20I 1565	11 June	Germany	Venkatraman Ganesan	Sweden	Abhijit Venkatesh	Bayer Uerdingen Cricket Ground, Krefeld	Germany by 29 runs
Final
T20I 1567	12 June	Germany	Venkatraman Ganesan	Austria	Razmal Shigiwal	Bayer Uerdingen Cricket Ground, Krefeld	Germany by 3 wickets

=== Malta in Belgium ===
T20I series
No.	Date	Home captain	Away captain	Venue	Result
T20I 1558	11 June	Sheraz Sheikh	Bikram Arora	Ghent Oval, Ghent	Belgium by 111 runs
T20I 1562	11 June	Sheraz Sheikh	Bikram Arora	Ghent Oval, Ghent	Belgium by 84 runs
T20I 1566	12 June	Sheraz Sheikh	Bikram Arora	Royal Brussels Cricket Club, Waterloo	Belgium by 122 runs

=== Switzerland in Luxembourg ===
T20I series
No.	Date	Home captain	Away captain	Venue	Result
T20I 1559	11 June	Joost Mees	Faheem Nazir	Pierre Werner Cricket Ground, Walferdange	Luxembourg by 18 runs
T20I 1563	11 June	Joost Mees	Faheem Nazir	Pierre Werner Cricket Ground, Walferdange	Switzerland by 78 runs

=== 2022 ACC Women's T20 Championship ===
Pos	Team	Pld	W	L	NR	Pts	NRR
1	United Arab Emirates	4	3	0	1	7	5.713
2	Malaysia	4	3	1	0	6	2.383
3	Qatar	4	2	2	0	4	−1.419
4	Singapore	4	1	3	0	2	−3.777
5	Oman	4	0	3	1	1	−2.058

Source: ESPN Cricinfo

Pos	Team	Pld	W	L	NR	Pts	NRR
1	Hong Kong	4	4	0	0	8	1.532
2	Nepal	4	3	1	0	6	1.094
3	Kuwait	4	1	2	1	3	−0.777
4	Bhutan	4	1	3	0	2	0.122
5	Bahrain	4	0	3	1	1	−3.024

Source: ESPN Cricinfo

Round-robin
No.	Date	Team 1	Captain 1	Team 2	Captain 2	Venue	Result
WT20I 1121	17 June	Bhutan	Yeshey Choden	Nepal	Rubina Chhetry	UKM-YSD Cricket Oval, Bangi	Nepal by 50 runs
WT20I 1122	17 June	Malaysia	Winifred Duraisingam	Singapore	Shafina Mahesh	Kinrara Academy Oval, Kuala Lumpur	Malaysia by 117 runs
WT20I 1123	17 June	Bahrain	Deepika Rasangika	Kuwait	Amna Tariq	Kinrara Academy Oval, Kuala Lumpur	No result
WT20I 1124	17 June	Oman	Vaishali Jesrani	United Arab Emirates	Chaya Mughal	UKM-YSD Cricket Oval, Bangi	No result
WT20I 1127	18 June	Bhutan	Yeshey Choden	Hong Kong	Kary Chan	UKM-YSD Cricket Oval, Bangi	Hong Kong by 14 runs
WT20I 1128	18 June	Singapore	Shafina Mahesh	United Arab Emirates	Chaya Mughal	Kinrara Academy Oval, Kuala Lumpur	United Arab Emirates by 10 wickets
WT20I 1129	18 June	Kuwait	Amna Tariq	Nepal	Rubina Chhetry	Kinrara Academy Oval, Kuala Lumpur	Nepal by 25 runs
WT20I 1130	18 June	Malaysia	Winifred Duraisingam	Qatar	Aysha	UKM-YSD Cricket Oval, Bangi	Malaysia by 10 wickets
WT20I 1133	19 June	Bahrain	Deepika Rasangika	Hong Kong	Kary Chan	Kinrara Academy Oval, Kuala Lumpur	Hong Kong by 8 wickets
WT20I 1134	19 June	Oman	Vaishali Jesrani	Qatar	Aysha	UKM-YSD Cricket Oval, Bangi	Qatar by 7 wickets
WT20I 1135	20 June	Bahrain	Deepika Rasangika	Nepal	Rubina Chhetry	Kinrara Academy Oval, Kuala Lumpur	Nepal by 8 wickets
WT20I 1136	20 June	Malaysia	Winifred Duraisingam	United Arab Emirates	Chaya Mughal	UKM-YSD Cricket Oval, Bangi	United Arab Emirates by 31 runs
WT20I 1137	20 June	Oman	Vaishali Jesrani	Singapore	Shafina Mahesh	Kinrara Academy Oval, Kuala Lumpur	Singapore by 5 wickets
WT20I 1138	21 June	Bhutan	Yeshey Choden	Kuwait	Amna Tariq	Kinrara Academy Oval, Kuala Lumpur	Kuwait by 3 wickets
WT20I 1139	21 June	Qatar	Aysha	Singapore	Shafina Mahesh	UKM-YSD Cricket Oval, Bangi	Qatar by 5 wickets
WT20I 1140	21 June	Hong Kong	Kary Chan	Nepal	Rubina Chhetry	Kinrara Academy Oval, Kuala Lumpur	Hong Kong by 7 wickets
WT20I 1141	22 June	Hong Kong	Kary Chan	Kuwait	Amna Tariq	UKM-YSD Cricket Oval, Bangi	Hong Kong by 30 runs
WT20I 1142	22 June	Malaysia	Winifred Duraisingam	Oman	Vaishali Jesrani	Kinrara Academy Oval, Kuala Lumpur	Malaysia by 53 runs
WT20I 1143	22 June	Bahrain	Deepika Rasangika	Bhutan	Yeshey Choden	UKM-YSD Cricket Oval, Bangi	Bhutan by 63 runs
WT20I 1144	22 June	Qatar	Aysha	United Arab Emirates	Chaya Mughal	Kinrara Academy Oval, Kuala Lumpur	United Arab Emirates by 153 runs
Play-offs
No.	Date	Team 1	Captain 1	Team 2	Captain 2	Venue	Result
WT20I 1146	24 June	Nepal	Rubina Chhetry	United Arab Emirates	Chaya Mughal	Kinrara Academy Oval, Kuala Lumpur	No result
WT20I 1147	24 June	Malaysia	Winifred Duraisingam	Hong Kong	Kary Chan	Kinrara Academy Oval, Kuala Lumpur	Malaysia by 12 runs
WT20I 1148	25 June	Malaysia	Winifred Duraisingam	United Arab Emirates	Chaya Mughal	Kinrara Academy Oval, Kuala Lumpur	United Arab Emirates by 5 wickets

=== Estonia in Finland ===
T20I series
No.	Date	Home captain	Away captain	Venue	Result
T20I 1573	19 June	Nathan Collins	Arslan Amjad	Kerava National Cricket Ground, Kerava	Finland by 23 runs
T20I 1574	19 June	Nathan Collins	Arslan Amjad	Kerava National Cricket Ground, Kerava	Finland by 11 runs

=== Serbia in Bulgaria ===
Sofia Twenty20 – T20I series
No.	Date	Home captain	Away captain	Venue	Result
T20I 1576	24 June	Prakash Mishra	Robin Vitas	National Sports Academy, Sofia	Bulgaria by 6 wickets
T20I 1577	25 June	Prakash Mishra	Robin Vitas	National Sports Academy, Sofia	Bulgaria by 5 wickets
T20I 1578	25 June	Hristo Lakov	Robin Vitas	National Sports Academy, Sofia	Bulgaria by 40 runs (DLS)
T20I 1579	26 June	Prakash Mishra	Robin Vitas	National Sports Academy, Sofia	Bulgaria by 6 wickets

=== Guernsey women in Jersey ===
Inter-Insular WT20I series
No.	Date	Home captain	Away captain	Venue	Result
WT20I 1150	25 June	Chloe Greechan	Hannah Mechem	Grainville Cricket Ground, Saint Saviour	Jersey by 9 wickets
WT20I 1151	25 June	Chloe Greechan	Hannah Mechem	Grainville Cricket Ground, Saint Saviour	Jersey by 69 runs

=== Namibia women in the Netherlands ===
WT20I series
No.	Date	Home captain	Away captain	Venue	Result
WT20I 1152a	27 June	Heather Siegers	Irene van Zyl	Sportpark Harga, Schiedam	Match abandoned
WT20I 1153	28 June	Heather Siegers	Irene van Zyl	Sportpark Harga, Schiedam	Namibia by 3 wickets
WT20I 1154	28 June	Heather Siegers	Irene van Zyl	Sportpark Harga, Schiedam	Netherlands by 70 runs
WT20I 1155	30 June	Heather Siegers	Irene van Zyl	Sportpark Westvliet, Voorburg	Namibia by 3 wickets
WT20I 1156	30 June	Heather Siegers	Irene van Zyl	Sportpark Westvliet, Voorburg	Netherlands by 5 runs (DLS)
WT20I 1157	1 July	Babette de Leede	Irene van Zyl	Sportpark Westvliet, Voorburg	Netherlands by 2 runs

=== 2022 ICC T20 World Cup Europe Qualifier C ===
Pos	Team	Pld	W	L	NR	Pts	NRR
1	Belgium	3	3	0	0	6	1.445
2	Denmark	3	2	1	0	4	3.467
3	Gibraltar	3	1	2	0	2	−3.560
4	Hungary	3	0	3	0	0	−1.617

Source: ESPN Cricinfo

Pos	Team	Pld	W	L	NR	Pts	NRR
1	Spain	3	3	0	0	6	2.682
2	Portugal	3	2	1	0	4	−0.281
3	Malta	3	1	2	0	2	−0.094
4	Israel	3	0	3	0	0	−1.870

Source: ESPN Cricinfo

Group stage
No.	Date	Team 1	Captain 1	Team 2	Captain 2	Venue	Result
T20I 1581	28 June	Belgium	Sheraz Sheikh	Gibraltar	Avinash Pai	Ghent Oval, Ghent	Belgium by 7 wickets
T20I 1582	28 June	Malta	Bikram Arora	Spain	Christian Munoz-Mills	Royal Brussels Cricket Club, Waterloo	Spain by 6 wickets
T20I 1584	28 June	Denmark	Frederik Klokker	Hungary	Abhijeet Ahuja	Ghent Oval, Ghent	Denmark by 88 runs
T20I 1585	28 June	Israel	Josh Evans	Portugal	Najjam Shahzad	Royal Brussels Cricket Club, Waterloo	Portugal by 46 runs
T20I 1587	29 June	Denmark	Frederik Klokker	Gibraltar	Avinash Pai	Royal Brussels Cricket Club, Waterloo	Denmark by 132 runs
T20I 1588	29 June	Malta	Bikram Arora	Portugal	Najjam Shahzad	Ghent Oval, Ghent	Portugal by 11 runs
T20I 1590	29 June	Belgium	Sheraz Sheikh	Hungary	Abhijeet Ahuja	Royal Brussels Cricket Club, Waterloo	Belgium by 2 wickets
T20I 1591	29 June	Israel	Josh Evans	Spain	Christian Munoz-Mills	Ghent Oval, Ghent	Spain by 7 wickets
T20I 1593	1 July	Gibraltar	Avinash Pai	Hungary	Abhijeet Ahuja	Royal Brussels Cricket Club, Waterloo	Gibraltar by 4 wickets
T20I 1594	1 July	Portugal	Najjam Shahzad	Spain	Christian Munoz-Mills	Ghent Oval, Ghent	Spain by 8 wickets
T20I 1595	1 July	Belgium	Sheraz Sheikh	Denmark	Hamid Shah	Royal Brussels Cricket Club, Waterloo	Belgium by 12 runs
T20I 1596	1 July	Israel	Josh Evans	Malta	Bikram Arora	Ghent Oval, Ghent	Malta by 16 runs
Play-offs
No.	Date	Team 1	Captain 1	Team 2	Captain 2	Venue	Result
T20I 1598	2 July	Belgium	Sheraz Sheikh	Portugal	Najjam Shahzad	Royal Brussels Cricket Club, Waterloo	Portugal by 8 wickets
T20I 1598a	2 July	Gibraltar	Avinash Pai	Israel	Josh Evans	Ghent Oval, Ghent	Match abandoned
T20I 1600	2 July	Denmark	Frederik Klokker	Spain	Christian Munoz-Mills	Royal Brussels Cricket Club, Waterloo	Denmark by 41 runs
T20I 1600a	2 July	Hungary	Abhijeet Ahuja	Malta	Bikram Arora	Ghent Oval, Ghent	Match abandoned
T20I 1604	3 July	Hungary	Abhijeet Ahuja	Israel	Josh Evans	Royal Brussels Cricket Club, Waterloo	Israel by 12 runs
T20I 1606	3 July	Gibraltar	Avinash Pai	Malta	Bikram Arora	Royal Brussels Cricket Club, Waterloo	Malta by 7 wickets
T20I 1610	4 July	Belgium	Sheraz Sheikh	Spain	Christian Munoz-Mills	Royal Brussels Cricket Club, Waterloo	Belgium by 5 wickets
T20I 1611	4 July	Denmark	Hamid Shah	Portugal	Najjam Shahzad	Royal Brussels Cricket Club, Waterloo	Denmark by 9 wickets

=== Malaysia in Singapore ===
Stan Nagaiah Trophy – T20I series
No.	Date	Home captain	Away captain	Venue	Result
T20I 1583	28 June	Amjad Mahboob	Ahmad Faiz	Indian Association Ground, Singapore	Singapore by 4 wickets
T20I 1589	29 June	Amjad Mahboob	Ahmad Faiz	Indian Association Ground, Singapore	Malaysia by 23 runs
T20I 1592	30 June	Amjad Mahboob	Ahmad Faiz	Indian Association Ground, Singapore	Malaysia by 5 wickets

=== 2022 Namibia T20 Tri-Nation Series ===
Pos	Team	Pld	W	L	NR	Pts	NRR
1	Namibia	4	4	0	0	8	1.596
2	United States	4	2	2	0	4	0.552
3	Jersey	4	0	4	0	0	−2.130

Source: ESPN Cricinfo

Round-robin
No.	Date	Team 1	Captain 1	Team 2	Captain 2	Venue	Result
1st Match	29 June	Namibia	Gerhard Erasmus	Jersey	Dominic Blampied	United Cricket Club Ground, Windhoek	Namibia by 65 runs
2nd Match	30 June	Namibia	Gerhard Erasmus	United States	Monank Patel	United Cricket Club Ground, Windhoek	Namibia by 6 wickets
3rd Match	1 July	Namibia	Gerhard Erasmus	United States	Monank Patel	United Cricket Club Ground, Windhoek	Namibia by 9 wickets
4th Match	1 July	Namibia	JJ Smit	Jersey	Charles Perchard	United Cricket Club Ground, Windhoek	Namibia by 3 wickets
5th Match	2 July	Jersey	Charles Perchard	United States	Monank Patel	United Cricket Club Ground, Windhoek	United States by 50 runs
6th Match	3 July	Jersey	Dominic Blampied	United States	Monank Patel	United Cricket Club Ground, Windhoek	United States by 7 wickets

== July ==
=== 2022 Malaysia Quadrangular Series ===
Pos	Team	Pld	W	L	NR	Pts	NRR
1	Malaysia	6	6	0	0	12	5.495
2	Bhutan	6	4	2	0	8	−1.356
3	Maldives	6	2	4	0	4	−0.665
4	Thailand	6	0	6	0	0	−2.484

Source: ESPN Cricinfo

Round-robin
No.	Date	Team 1	Captain 1	Team 2	Captain 2	Venue	Result
T20I 1597	2 July	Malaysia	Virandeep Singh	Bhutan	Jigme Singye	UKM-YSD Cricket Oval, Bangi	Malaysia by 155 runs
T20I 1602	3 July	Maldives	Azyan Farhath	Thailand	Chanchai Pengkumta	UKM-YSD Cricket Oval, Bangi	Maldives by 7 wickets
T20I 1603	3 July	Malaysia	Virandeep Singh	Bhutan	Jigme Singye	UKM-YSD Cricket Oval, Bangi	Malaysia by 39 runs
T20I 1608	4 July	Malaysia	Ahmad Faiz	Thailand	Chanchai Pengkumta	UKM-YSD Cricket Oval, Bangi	Malaysia by 9 wickets
T20I 1609	4 July	Bhutan	Jigme Singye	Maldives	Azyan Farhath	UKM-YSD Cricket Oval, Bangi	Bhutan by 6 runs
T20I 1612	6 July	Bhutan	Jigme Singye	Thailand	Chanchai Pengkumta	UKM-YSD Cricket Oval, Bangi	Bhutan by 6 wickets
T20I 1613	6 July	Malaysia	Ahmad Faiz	Maldives	Azyan Farhath	UKM-YSD Cricket Oval, Bangi	Malaysia by 8 wickets (DLS)
T20I 1614	7 July	Bhutan	Jigme Singye	Maldives	Azyan Farhath	UKM-YSD Cricket Oval, Bangi	Bhutan by 2 runs
T20I 1615	7 July	Malaysia	Ahmad Faiz	Thailand	Chanchai Pengkumta	UKM-YSD Cricket Oval, Bangi	Malaysia by 9 wickets
T20I 1618	8 July	Maldives	Azyan Farhath	Thailand	Chanchai Pengkumta	UKM-YSD Cricket Oval, Bangi	Maldives by 41 runs
T20I 1622	9 July	Malaysia	Ahmad Faiz	Maldives	Azyan Farhath	UKM-YSD Cricket Oval, Bangi	Malaysia by 94 runs
T20I 1623	9 July	Bhutan	Jigme Singye	Thailand	Chanchai Pengkumta	UKM-YSD Cricket Oval, Bangi	Bhutan by 28 runs
Final
T20I 1632	11 July	Malaysia	Ahmad Faiz	Bhutan	Jigme Singye	UKM-YSD Cricket Oval, Bangi	Malaysia by 9 wickets

=== Papua New Guinea in Singapore ===
T20I series
No.	Date	Home captain	Away captain	Venue	Result
T20I 1599	2 July	Amjad Mahboob	Assad Vala	Indian Association Ground, Singapore	Singapore by 18 runs
T20I 1605	3 July	Amjad Mahboob	Assad Vala	Indian Association Ground, Singapore	Papua New Guinea by 3 wickets
T20I 1611a	5 July	Amjad Mahboob	Assad Vala	Indian Association Ground, Singapore	Match abandoned

=== Namibia women in Germany ===
WT20I series
No.	Date	Home captain	Away captain	Venue	Result
WT20I 1158	2 July	Anuradha Doddaballapur	Irene van Zyl	Bayer Uerdingen Cricket Ground, Krefeld	Namibia by 10 wickets
WT20I 1159	3 July	Anuradha Doddaballapur	Irene van Zyl	Bayer Uerdingen Cricket Ground, Krefeld	Namibia by 150 runs
WT20I 1160	3 July	Anuradha Doddaballapur	Irene van Zyl	Bayer Uerdingen Cricket Ground, Krefeld	Namibia by 82 runs

=== 2022 Central Europe Cup ===
Pos	Team	Pld	W	L	NR	Pts	NRR
1	Czech Republic	4	3	1	0	12	1.020
2	Austria	4	3	1	0	12	0.860
3	Luxembourg	4	0	4	0	0	−2.037

Source: ESPN Cricinfo

T20I series
No.	Date	Team 1	Captain 1	Team 2	Captain 2	Venue	Result
T20I 1619	8 July	Austria	Razmal Shigiwal	Luxembourg	Joost Mees	Vinoř Cricket Ground, Prague	Austria by 5 wickets
T20I 1620	8 July	Czech Republic	Arun Ashokan	Luxembourg	Joost Mees	Vinoř Cricket Ground, Prague	Czech Republic by 5 wickets
T20I 1624	9 July	Czech Republic	Arun Ashokan	Austria	Razmal Shigiwal	Vinoř Cricket Ground, Prague	Austria by 4 wickets
T20I 1626	9 July	Austria	Razmal Shigiwal	Luxembourg	Joost Mees	Vinoř Cricket Ground, Prague	Austria by 35 runs (DLS)
T20I 1629	10 July	Czech Republic	Arun Ashokan	Luxembourg	Joost Mees	Vinoř Cricket Ground, Prague	Czech Republic by 36 runs
T20I 1630	10 July	Czech Republic	Arun Ashokan	Austria	Razmal Shigiwal	Vinoř Cricket Ground, Prague	Czech Republic by 6 wickets

=== Malaysia women in Singapore ===
Saudari Cup – WT20I series
No.	Date	Home captain	Away captain	Venue	Result
WT20I 1161	8 July	Shafina Mahesh	Winifred Duraisingam	Indian Association Ground, Singapore	Malaysia by 6 wickets
WT20I 1162	9 July	Shafina Mahesh	Winifred Duraisingam	Indian Association Ground, Singapore	Malaysia by 75 runs
WT20I 1163	10 July	Shafina Mahesh	Winifred Duraisingam	Indian Association Ground, Singapore	Malaysia by 79 runs

=== Bulgaria in Serbia ===
T20I series
No.	Date	Home captain	Away captain	Venue	Result
T20I 1621	8 July	Robin Vitas	Prakash Mishra	Lisicji Jarak Cricket Ground, Belgrade	Serbia by 7 wickets
T20I 1625	9 July	Robin Vitas	Prakash Mishra	Lisicji Jarak Cricket Ground, Belgrade	Serbia by 8 wickets
T20I 1627	9 July	Mark Pavlovic	Prakash Mishra	Lisicji Jarak Cricket Ground, Belgrade	Bulgaria by 95 runs

=== 2022 ICC T20 World Cup Global Qualifier B ===
Pos	Team	Pld	W	L	NR	Pts	NRR
1	Zimbabwe	3	3	0	0	6	3.000
2	United States	3	2	1	0	4	1.779
3	Jersey	3	1	2	0	2	−0.484
4	Singapore	3	0	3	0	0	−4.267

Source: ESPN Cricinfo

Pos	Team	Pld	W	L	NR	Pts	NRR
1	Netherlands	3	3	0	0	6	3.473
2	Papua New Guinea	3	1	2	0	2	−0.419
3	Hong Kong	3	1	2	0	2	−0.898
4	Uganda	3	1	2	0	2	−1.996

Source: ESPN Cricinfo

Group stage
No.	Date	Team 1	Captain 1	Team 2	Captain 2	Venue	Result
T20I 1633	11 July	Jersey	Charles Perchard	United States	Monank Patel	Bulawayo Athletic Club, Bulawayo	United States by 8 wickets
T20I 1634	11 July	Zimbabwe	Craig Ervine	Singapore	Amjad Mahboob	Queens Sports Club, Bulawayo	Zimbabwe by 111 runs
T20I 1635	11 July	Hong Kong	Nizakat Khan	Uganda	Kenneth Waiswa	Bulawayo Athletic Club, Bulawayo	Uganda by 2 wickets
T20I 1636	11 July	Netherlands	Scott Edwards	Papua New Guinea	Assad Vala	Queens Sports Club, Bulawayo	Netherlands by 52 runs
T20I 1637	12 July	Singapore	Amjad Mahboob	United States	Monank Patel	Bulawayo Athletic Club, Bulawayo	United States by 132 runs
T20I 1638	12 July	Zimbabwe	Craig Ervine	Jersey	Charles Perchard	Queens Sports Club, Bulawayo	Zimbabwe by 23 runs
T20I 1641	12 July	Hong Kong	Nizakat Khan	Netherlands	Scott Edwards	Queens Sports Club, Bulawayo	Netherlands by 7 wickets
T20I 1642	12 July	Papua New Guinea	Assad Vala	Uganda	Kenneth Waiswa	Bulawayo Athletic Club, Bulawayo	Papua New Guinea by 8 wickets
T20I 1649	14 July	Hong Kong	Nizakat Khan	Papua New Guinea	Assad Vala	Bulawayo Athletic Club, Bulawayo	Hong Kong by 2 wickets
T20I 1650	14 July	Netherlands	Scott Edwards	Uganda	Kenneth Waiswa	Queens Sports Club, Bulawayo	Netherlands by 97 runs
T20I 1651	14 July	Jersey	Charles Perchard	Singapore	Amjad Mahboob	Bulawayo Athletic Club, Bulawayo	Jersey by 13 runs
T20I 1652	14 July	Zimbabwe	Craig Ervine	United States	Monank Patel	Queens Sports Club, Bulawayo	Zimbabwe by 46 runs
Play-offs
No.	Date	Team 1	Captain 1	Team 2	Captain 2	Venue	Result
T20I 1653	15 July	Hong Kong	Nizakat Khan	Singapore	Amjad Mahboob	Bulawayo Athletic Club, Bulawayo	Hong Kong by 7 wickets
T20I 1654	15 July	Jersey	Charles Perchard	Uganda	Kenneth Waiswa	Queens Sports Club, Bulawayo	Uganda by 5 runs
T20I 1657	15 July	Netherlands	Scott Edwards	United States	Monank Patel	Bulawayo Athletic Club, Bulawayo	Netherlands by 7 wickets
T20I 1658	15 July	Zimbabwe	Craig Ervine	Papua New Guinea	Assad Vala	Queens Sports Club, Bulawayo	Zimbabwe by 27 runs
T20I 1665	17 July	Hong Kong	Nizakat Khan	Uganda	Kenneth Waiswa	Queens Sports Club, Bulawayo	Uganda by 4 runs
T20I 1666	17 July	Jersey	Charles Perchard	Singapore	Amjad Mahboob	Bulawayo Athletic Club, Bulawayo	Jersey by 6 wickets
T20I 1667	17 July	Papua New Guinea	Assad Vala	United States	Aaron Jones	Bulawayo Athletic Club, Bulawayo	Papua New Guinea by 5 runs
T20I 1668	17 July	Zimbabwe	Craig Ervine	Netherlands	Scott Edwards	Queens Sports Club, Bulawayo	Zimbabwe by 37 runs

=== 2022 ICC T20 World Cup Europe Qualifier A ===
Pos	Team	Pld	W	L	NR	Pts	NRR
1	Italy	4	4	0	0	8	4.517
2	Finland	4	3	1	0	6	1.008
3	Sweden	4	2	2	0	4	0.848
4	Croatia	4	1	3	0	2	−3.733
5	Greece	4	0	4	0	0	−2.648

Source: ESPN Cricinfo

Pos	Team	Pld	W	L	NR	Pts	NRR
1	Isle of Man	4	4	0	0	8	3.238
2	Cyprus	4	2	2	0	4	1.451
3	Romania	4	2	2	0	4	0.136
4	Serbia	4	2	2	0	4	−0.826
5	Turkey	4	0	4	0	0	−3.754

Source: ESPN Cricinfo

Group stage
No.	Date	Team 1	Captain 1	Team 2	Captain 2	Venue	Result
T20I 1639	12 July	Cyprus	Gurpratap Singh	Isle of Man	Matthew Ansell	Kerava National Cricket Ground, Kerava	Isle of Man by 8 wickets
T20I 1640	12 July	Greece	Anastasios Manousis	Italy	Gareth Berg	Tikkurila Cricket Ground, Vantaa	Italy by 9 wickets
T20I 1643	12 July	Finland	Nathan Collins	Sweden	Abhijit Venkatesh	Tikkurila Cricket Ground, Vantaa	Finland by 12 runs
T20I 1644	12 July	Romania	Ramesh Satheesan	Turkey	Gokhan Alta	Kerava National Cricket Ground, Kerava	Romania by 51 runs
T20I 1645	13 July	Croatia	Jeffrey Grzinic	Sweden	Abhijit Venkatesh	Kerava National Cricket Ground, Kerava	Sweden by 8 wickets
T20I 1646	13 July	Cyprus	Gurpratap Singh	Romania	Ramesh Satheesan	Tikkurila Cricket Ground, Vantaa	Cyprus by 20 runs
T20I 1647	13 July	Finland	Nathan Collins	Italy	Gareth Berg	Kerava National Cricket Ground, Kerava	Italy by 5 wickets
T20I 1648	13 July	Isle of Man	Matthew Ansell	Serbia	Robin Vitas	Tikkurila Cricket Ground, Vantaa	Isle of Man by 68 runs
T20I 1655	15 July	Italy	Gareth Berg	Sweden	Abhijit Venkatesh	Tikkurila Cricket Ground, Vantaa	Italy by 91 runs
T20I 1656	15 July	Serbia	Robin Vitas	Turkey	Gokhan Alta	Kerava National Cricket Ground, Kerava	Serbia by 7 wickets
T20I 1659	15 July	Croatia	Jeffrey Grzinic	Greece	Anastasios Manousis	Tikkurila Cricket Ground, Vantaa	Croatia by 3 runs
T20I 1660	15 July	Isle of Man	Matthew Ansell	Romania	Ramesh Satheesan	Kerava National Cricket Ground, Kerava	Isle of Man by 8 wickets
T20I 1661	16 July	Finland	Nathan Collins	Greece	Anastasios Manousis	Kerava National Cricket Ground, Kerava	Finland by 37 runs
T20I 1662	16 July	Romania	Ramesh Satheesan	Serbia	Robin Vitas	Tikkurila Cricket Ground, Vantaa	Romania by 31 runs
T20I 1663	16 July	Croatia	Jeffrey Grzinic	Italy	Gian-Piero Meade	Kerava National Cricket Ground, Kerava	Italy by 166 runs
T20I 1664	16 July	Cyprus	Gurpratap Singh	Turkey	Gokhan Alta	Tikkurila Cricket Ground, Vantaa	Cyprus by 135 runs
T20I 1669	18 July	Cyprus	Gurpratap Singh	Serbia	Mark Pavlovic	Kerava National Cricket Ground, Kerava	Serbia by 4 wickets
T20I 1670	18 July	Greece	Anastasios Manousis	Sweden	Abhijit Venkatesh	Tikkurila Cricket Ground, Vantaa	Sweden by 107 runs
T20I 1671	18 July	Finland	Nathan Collins	Croatia	Jeffrey Grzinic	Tikkurila Cricket Ground, Vantaa	Finland by 5 wickets
T20I 1672	18 July	Isle of Man	Matthew Ansell	Turkey	Gokhan Alta	Kerava National Cricket Ground, Kerava	Isle of Man by 74 runs
Play-offs
No.	Date	Team 1	Captain 1	Team 2	Captain 2	Venue	Result
T20I 1674	19 July	Croatia	Jeffrey Grzinic	Serbia	Mark Pavlovic	Tikkurila Cricket Ground, Vantaa	Croatia by 3 wickets
T20I 1675	19 July	Finland	Nathan Collins	Cyprus	Gurpratap Singh	Kerava National Cricket Ground, Kerava	Finland by 11 runs
T20I 1676	19 July	Isle of Man	Matthew Ansell	Italy	Gareth Berg	Kerava National Cricket Ground, Kerava	Italy by 7 wickets
T20I 1677	19 July	Romania	Ramesh Satheesan	Sweden	Abhijit Venkatesh	Tikkurila Cricket Ground, Vantaa	Sweden by 8 wickets

=== 2022 ICC T20 World Cup Europe Qualifier B ===
Pos	Team	Pld	W	L	NR	Pts	NRR
1	Austria	4	4	0	0	8	4.249
2	Guernsey	4	3	1	0	6	2.200
3	Luxembourg	4	2	2	0	4	−0.391
4	Bulgaria	4	1	3	0	2	−3.341
5	Slovenia	4	0	4	0	0	−3.457

Source: ESPN Cricinfo

Pos	Team	Pld	W	L	NR	Pts	NRR
1	Norway	4	3	1	0	6	3.197
2	France	4	3	1	0	6	1.151
3	Switzerland	4	2	2	0	4	−0.006
4	Czech Republic	4	2	2	0	4	−1.417
5	Estonia	4	0	4	0	0	−2.419

Source: ESPN Cricinfo

Group stage
No.	Date	Team 1	Captain 1	Team 2	Captain 2	Venue	Result
T20I 1680	24 July	Austria	Razmal Shigiwal	Luxembourg	Joost Mees	Tikkurila Cricket Ground, Vantaa	Austria by 36 runs
T20I 1681	24 July	Estonia	Arslan Amjad	Norway	Ali Saleem	Kerava National Cricket Ground, Kerava	Norway by 10 wickets
T20I 1682	24 July	Bulgaria	Prakash Mishra	Guernsey	Josh Butler	Tikkurila Cricket Ground, Vantaa	Guernsey by 52 runs (DLS method)
T20I 1683	24 July	Czech Republic	Arun Ashokan	France	Noman Amjad	Kerava National Cricket Ground, Kerava	France by 51 runs
T20I 1684	25 July	Austria	Razmal Shigiwal	Slovenia	Ayyaz Qureshi	Kerava National Cricket Ground, Kerava	Austria by 141 runs
T20I 1685	25 July	Czech Republic	Arun Ashokan	Norway	Ali Saleem	Tikkurila Cricket Ground, Vantaa	Norway by 120 runs
T20I 1686	25 July	France	Noman Amjad	Switzerland	Faheem Nazir	Tikkurila Cricket Ground, Vantaa	Switzerland by 1 wicket
T20I 1687	25 July	Guernsey	Josh Butler	Luxembourg	Joost Mees	Kerava National Cricket Ground, Kerava	Guernsey by 17 runs
T20I 1688	27 July	Austria	Razmal Shigiwal	Guernsey	Josh Butler	Tikkurila Cricket Ground, Vantaa	Austria by 2 wickets
T20I 1689	27 July	Estonia	Arslan Amjad	Switzerland	Faheem Nazir	Kerava National Cricket Ground, Kerava	Switzerland by 31 runs
T20I 1690	27 July	Bulgaria	Prakash Mishra	Slovenia	Ayyaz Qureshi	Tikkurila Cricket Ground, Vantaa	Bulgaria by 3 wickets
T20I 1691	27 July	France	Noman Amjad	Norway	Ali Saleem	Kerava National Cricket Ground, Kerava	France by 11 runs
T20I 1694	28 July	Bulgaria	Prakash Mishra	Luxembourg	Joost Mees	Kerava National Cricket Ground, Kerava	Luxembourg by 21 runs (DLS method)
T20I 1695	28 July	Norway	Ali Saleem	Switzerland	Faheem Nazir	Tikkurila Cricket Ground, Vantaa	Norway by 12 runs (DLS method)
T20I 1696	28 July	Czech Republic	Arun Ashokan	Estonia	Arslan Amjad	Tikkurila Cricket Ground, Vantaa	Czech Republic by 42 runs
T20I 1697	28 July	Guernsey	Josh Butler	Slovenia	Ayyaz Qureshi	Kerava National Cricket Ground, Kerava	Guernsey by 9 wickets
T20I 1704	30 July	Austria	Razmal Shigiwal	Bulgaria	Prakash Mishra	Tikkurila Cricket Ground, Vantaa	Austria by 158 runs
T20I 1705	30 July	Czech Republic	Arun Ashokan	Switzerland	Faheem Nazir	Kerava National Cricket Ground, Kerava	Czech Republic by 7 wickets
T20I 1708	30 July	Luxembourg	Joost Mees	Slovenia	Ayyaz Qureshi	Tikkurila Cricket Ground, Vantaa	Luxembourg by 5 runs
T20I 1709	30 July	Estonia	Arslan Amjad	France	Noman Amjad	Kerava National Cricket Ground, Kerava	France by 25 runs (DLS method)
Play-offs
No.	Date	Team 1	Captain 1	Team 2	Captain 2	Venue	Result
T20I 1711	31 July	Bulgaria	Prakash Mishra	Czech Republic	Arun Ashokan	Tikkurila Cricket Ground, Vantaa	Czech Republic by 4 wickets
T20I 1712	31 July	France	Noman Amjad	Guernsey	Josh Butler	Kerava National Cricket Ground, Kerava	Guernsey by 56 runs
T20I 1715	31 July	Austria	Razmal Shigiwal	Norway	Ali Saleem	Kerava National Cricket Ground, Kerava	Austria by 9 wickets (DLS method)
T20I 1716	31 July	Luxembourg	Joost Mees	Switzerland	Faheem Nazir	Tikkurila Cricket Ground, Vantaa	Luxembourg by 7 runs

=== Mozambique in Eswatini ===
T20I series
No.	Date	Home captain	Away captain	Venue	Result
T20I 1699	29 July	Melusi Magagula	Filipe Cossa	Malkerns Country Club Oval, Malkerns	Mozambique by 8 wickets
T20I 1700	29 July	Melusi Magagula	Filipe Cossa	Malkerns Country Club Oval, Malkerns	Mozambique by 7 wickets
T20I 1703	30 July	Melusi Magagula	Filipe Cossa	Malkerns Country Club Oval, Malkerns	Mozambique by 8 wickets
T20I 1707	30 July	Melusi Magagula	Filipe Cossa	Malkerns Country Club Oval, Malkerns	Mozambique by 95 runs
T20I 1710	31 July	Melusi Magagula	Filipe Cossa	Malkerns Country Club Oval, Malkerns	Mozambique by 94 runs
T20I 1714	31 July	Melusi Magagula	Filipe Cossa	Malkerns Country Club Oval, Malkerns	Mozambique by 43 runs

=== Mozambique women in Eswatini ===
WT20I series
No.	Date	Home captain	Away captain	Venue	Result
WT20I 1172	29 July	Ntombizonke Mkhatshwa	Palmira Cuinica	Enjabulweni Cricket Ground, Manzini	Mozambique by 128 runs
WT20I 1174	29 July	Ntombizonke Mkhatshwa	Palmira Cuinica	Enjabulweni Cricket Ground, Manzini	Mozambique by 9 wickets
WT20I 1176	30 July	Ntombizonke Mkhatshwa	Palmira Cuinica	Enjabulweni Cricket Ground, Manzini	Mozambique by 105 runs
WT20I 1178	30 July	Ntombizonke Mkhatshwa	Palmira Cuinica	Enjabulweni Cricket Ground, Manzini	Mozambique by 107 runs (DLS method)
WT20I 1180	31 July	Ntombizonke Mkhatshwa	Palmira Cuinica	Enjabulweni Cricket Ground, Manzini	Mozambique by 3 wickets
WT20I 1182	31 July	Ntombizodwa Mkhatshwa	Amelia Mundundo	Enjabulweni Cricket Ground, Manzini	Mozambique by 7 wickets

== August ==
=== Bahrain against Kuwait in Oman ===
T20I series
No.	Date	Home captain	Away captain	Venue	Result
T20I 1730	11 August	Sarfaraz Ali	Mohammed Aslam	Oman Cricket Academy Ground Turf 1, Muscat	Match tied (Bahrain won S/O)
T20I 1733	13 August	Sarfaraz Ali	Mohammed Aslam	Oman Cricket Academy Ground Turf 1, Muscat	Kuwait by 20 runs
T20I 1734	14 August	Haider Butt	Mohammed Aslam	Oman Cricket Academy Ground Turf 1, Muscat	Kuwait by 5 wickets
T20I 1737	16 August	Haider Butt	Mohammed Aslam	Oman Cricket Academy Ground Turf 1, Muscat	Kuwait by 4 wickets
T20I 1739	17 August	Haider Butt	Mohammed Aslam	Oman Cricket Academy Ground Turf 1, Muscat	Kuwait by 102 runs

=== 2022 Baltic Cup ===
Matches played at the Baltic Cup did not have T20I status as only Estonia were members of the ICC.

Pos	Team	Pld	W	L	NR	Pts	NRR
1	Latvia	3	3	0	0	6	2.383
2	Estonia	3	2	1	0	4	−0.013
3	Estonia A	3	1	2	0	2	0.833
4	Lithuania	3	0	3	0	0	−3.200

Source: CricHeroes

Round-robin
No.	Date	Team 1	Captain 1	Team 2	Captain 2	Venue	Result
1st Match	13 August	Estonia	Kalle Vislapuu	Lithuania	Ranjit Singh	National Cricket Field 1, Tallinn	Estonia by 16 runs
2nd Match	13 August	Estonia A	Anurag Singh	Latvia	Mehdi Abbas	National Cricket Field 2, Tallinn	Latvia by 55 runs
3rd Match	13 August	Estonia	Arslan Amjad	Estonia A	Ashish Rana	National Cricket Field 1, Tallinn	Estonia by 9 wickets
4th Match	13 August	Latvia	Mehdi Abbas	Lithuania	Ranjit Singh	National Cricket Field 2, Tallinn	Latvia by 54 runs
5th Match	14 August	Estonia	Arslan Amjad	Latvia	Mehdi Abbas	National Cricket Field 1, Tallinn	Latvia by 34 runs
6th Match	14 August	Estonia A	Adithyavishnu Vaikkath	Lithuania	Ranjit Singh	National Cricket Field 2, Tallinn	Estonia A by 122 runs

=== Italy women in Austria ===
WT20I series
No.	Date	Home captain	Away captain	Venue	Result
WT20I 1194	17 August	Gandhali Bapat	Kumudu Peddrick	Seebarn Cricket Ground, Lower Austria	Italy by 8 wickets
WT20I 1195	18 August	Gandhali Bapat	Kumudu Peddrick	Seebarn Cricket Ground, Lower Austria	Italy by 106 runs
WT20I 1196	18 August	Gandhali Bapat	Kumudu Peddrick	Seebarn Cricket Ground, Lower Austria	Italy by 3 wickets
WT20I 1197	19 August	Gandhali Bapat	Kumudu Peddrick	Seebarn Cricket Ground, Lower Austria	Italy by 4 wickets
WT20I 1198	20 August	Gandhali Bapat	Kumudu Peddrick	Seebarn Cricket Ground, Lower Austria	Italy by 7 wickets

=== 2022 Asia Cup Qualifier ===
Pos	Team	Pld	W	L	T	NR	Pts	NRR
1	Hong Kong	3	3	0	0	0	6	0.641
2	Kuwait	3	2	1	0	0	4	1.627
3	United Arab Emirates	3	1	2	0	0	2	0.538
4	Singapore	3	0	3	0	0	0	−2.684

Source: ESPNcricinfo

Advanced to Asia Cup

T20I series
No.	Date	Team 1	Captain 1	Team 2	Captain 2	Venue	Result
T20I 1740	20 August	Hong Kong	Nizakat Khan	Singapore	Amjad Mahboob	Oman Cricket Academy Ground Turf 1, Muscat	Hong Kong by 8 runs
T20I 1741	21 August	Kuwait	Mohammed Aslam	United Arab Emirates	Chundangapoyil Rizwan	Oman Cricket Academy Ground Turf 1, Muscat	Kuwait by 1 wicket
T20I 1742	22 August	Singapore	Amjad Mahboob	United Arab Emirates	Chundangapoyil Rizwan	Oman Cricket Academy Ground Turf 1, Muscat	United Arab Emirates by 47 runs
T20I 1743	23 August	Hong Kong	Nizakat Khan	Kuwait	Mohammed Aslam	Oman Cricket Academy Ground Turf 1, Muscat	Hong Kong by 8 wickets
T20I 1744	24 August	Kuwait	Mohammed Aslam	Singapore	Amjad Mahboob	Oman Cricket Academy Ground Turf 1, Muscat	Kuwait by 6 wickets
T20I 1745	24 August	Hong Kong	Nizakat Khan	United Arab Emirates	Chundangapoyil Rizwan	Oman Cricket Academy Ground Turf 1, Muscat	Hong Kong by 8 wickets

=== Nepal in Kenya ===
T20I series
No.	Date	Home captain	Away captain	Venue	Result
T20I 1746	25 August	Shem Ngoche	Sandeep Lamichhane	Gymkhana Club Ground, Nairobi	Nepal by 5 wickets
T20I 1747	26 August	Shem Ngoche	Sandeep Lamichhane	Gymkhana Club Ground, Nairobi	Kenya by 18 runs
T20I 1749	28 August	Shem Ngoche	Sandeep Lamichhane	Gymkhana Club Ground, Nairobi	Nepal by 4 wickets
T20I 1751	29 August	Shem Ngoche	Sandeep Lamichhane	Gymkhana Club Ground, Nairobi	Kenya by 7 runs
T20I 1752	30 August	Shem Ngoche	Sandeep Lamichhane	Gymkhana Club Ground, Nairobi	Nepal by 31 runs

=== Malta women in Romania ===
Women's Continental Cup – WT20I series
No.	Date	Home captain	Away captain	Venue	Result
WT20I 1199	27 August	Andreea Vasilescu	Shamla Cholasseri	Moara Vlasiei Cricket Ground, Ilfov County	Malta by 32 runs
WT20I 1200	28 August	Clara Popa	Shamla Cholasseri	Moara Vlasiei Cricket Ground, Ilfov County	Malta by 6 wickets
WT20I 1201	28 August	Clara Popa	Shamla Cholasseri	Moara Vlasiei Cricket Ground, Ilfov County	Malta by 8 wickets

== September ==
=== 2022 Women's Balkan Cup ===
Pos	Team	Pld	W	L	NR	Pts	NRR
1	Greece	2	2	0	0	4	3.050
2	Romania	2	1	1	0	2	3.004
3	Serbia	2	0	2	0	0	−6.748

Source: ESPN Cricinfo

Round-robin
No.	Date	Team 1	Captain 1	Team 2	Captain 2	Venue	Result
WT20I 1204	9 September	Romania	Rebecca Blake	Greece	Joanna Chytiri	Moara Vlasiei Cricket Ground, Ilfov County	Greece by 8 wickets
WT20I 1205	10 September	Greece	Joanna Chytiri	Serbia	Magdalena Nikolic	Moara Vlasiei Cricket Ground, Ilfov County	Greece by 10 wickets
WT20I 1207	10 September	Romania	Rebecca Blake	Serbia	Magdalena Nikolic	Moara Vlasiei Cricket Ground, Ilfov County	Romania by 145 runs
Play-offs
No.	Date	Team 1	Captain 1	Team 2	Captain 2	Venue	Result
WT20I 1210	11 September	Romania	Ashaani Durayalage	Serbia	Nadja Nojic	Moara Vlasiei Cricket Ground, Ilfov County	Romania by 7 wickets
WT20I 1211	11 September	Romania	Rebecca Blake	Greece	Joanna Chytiri	Moara Vlasiei Cricket Ground, Ilfov County	Greece by 10 wickets

== See also ==
- International cricket in 2022
