= Mark Simpson-Parker =

Austrian cricketer

Personal information
- Full name: Mark Simpson-Parker
- Born: 30 April 1997 (age 29)
- Batting: Right-handed
- Role: Bowling all-rounder

International information
- National side: Austria
- T20I debut (cap 11): 29 August 2019 v Romania
- Last T20I: 31 July 2022 v Norway
- Source: Cricinfo, 13 December 2022

Mark Simpson-Parker (born 30 April 1997) is an Austrian cricketer who plays internationally for the Austrian national cricket team.

== Career ==
Parker made his T20I debut for the Austrian national team on August 29, 2019, against Romania in the 2019 Continental Cup. Parker went on to take 3 wickets throughout the tournament, despite having scored no runs.

Parker would not play cricket throughout 2020 due to personal commitments and the COVID-19 pandemic but returned to play cricket in the 2021 Central Europe Cup. Parker would go on to become the second-highest run scorer of the cup with 160 runs, along with taking a wicket. He was then selected in Austria's squad for their tour of Belgium, in which he would score 30 runs and take no wickets in a 2–1 series defeat.

Parker was selected in June 2022 for Austria's squad in their home series against Hungary and in their away tri-nation series in Germany. Parker goes on to score 56 and 16 runs respectively and takes no wickets throughout the two series. He was then selected to play for in the 2022 Central Europe Cup in July, in which he scored 26 runs and took no wickets. He was then cleared to play in the 2022-23 ICC Men's T20 World Cup Europe Qualifier, wherein he made 36 runs with no additional wickets. Austria's performance in the qualifier granted them a spot in the Regional Final for a spot in the 2024 ICC Men's T20 World Cup.
