= 2022 Central Europe Cup =

International cricket tournament

- Dates: 8 – 10 July 2022
- Administrator: Czech Cricket Union
- Cricket format: Twenty20 International
- Host: Czech Republic
- Champions: Czech Republic (3rd title)
- Participants: 3
- Matches: 6
- Player of the series: (Czech Republic) Naveed Ahmed
- Most runs: (Czech Republic) Sabawoon Davizi (210)
- Most wickets: (Czech Republic) Naveed Ahmed (6) (Luxembourg) Pankaj Malav (6) (Austria) Aqib Iqbal (6)

The 2022 Central Europe Cup was a Twenty20 International (T20I) cricket tournament that was played in Prague from 8 to 10 July 2022. The participating teams were the hosts Czech Republic, along with Austria and Luxembourg – the same sides that competed in the previous edition of the tournament. The tournament was played in a double round-robin format. This was the eighth edition of the Central Europe Cup, with Austria the defending champions after having won on their debut at the Central Europe Cup in 2021.

== Squads ==
Austria	Czech Republic	Luxembourg
Razmal Shigiwal (c); Habib Ahmadzai; Mirza Ahsan; Abdullah Akbarjan; Mehar Cheema (wk); Itibarshah Deedar; Aqib Iqbal; Osman Khan; Shahil Momin; Jaweed Sadran; Umair Tariq; Mark Simpson-Parker; Navin Wijesekera; Sahel Zadran	Arun Ashokan (c); Naveed Ahmed; Sazib Bhuiyan; Sonny Clephane; Sabawoon Davizi; Tripurari Lal; Smit Patel; Divyendra Singh (wk); Dylan Steyn; Ushan Thenannahelage (wk); Ritik Tomar; Kranthi Venkataswamy; Sameera Waththage; Sudesh Wickramasekara	Joost Mees (c, wk); Vikram Vijh (vc); James Barker; Timothy Barker (wk); William Cope; Amit Dhingra; Mohit Dixit; Shiv Gill; Pankaj Malav; Ankush Nanda; Anoop Orsu; Anshuman Bhadauria; Ansh Trivedi; Girish Venkateswaran

Czech Republic named Vyshakh Jagannivasan and Sharan Ramakrishnan as reserves.

== Points Table ==
Pos	Team	Pld	W	L	NR	Pts	NRR
1	Czech Republic	4	3	1	0	12	1.020
2	Austria	4	3	1	0	12	0.860
3	Luxembourg	4	0	4	0	0	−2.037

Source: ESPN Cricinfo

== Fixtures ==
8 July 2022
10:00
Scorecard

Luxembourg; 119/5 (20 overs)	v	Austria; 123/5 (16.2 overs)
Shiv Gill 28* (30); Jaweed Sadran 3/17 (4 overs)		Razmal Shigiwal 65 (45); Shiv Gill 2/14 (2 overs)

Austria won by 5 wickets
Scott Page Field, Vinoř Cricket Ground, Prague
Umpires: Richard Eames (Lux) and Chris Tebb (Cze)
Player of the match: Razmal Shigiwal (Aut)

- Austria won the toss and elected to field.

8 July 2022
15:00
Scorecard

Luxembourg; 112/7 (20 overs)	v	Czech Republic; 115/5 (16.3 overs)
Shiv Gill 27 (32); Sazib Bhuiyan 3/24 (4 overs)		Sabawoon Davizi 40 (27); Pankaj Malav 2/25 (4 overs)

Czech Republic won by 5 wickets
Scott Page Field, Vinoř Cricket Ground, Prague
Umpires: Richard Eames (Lux) and Sunil Gowda (Ger)
Player of the match: Sazib Bhuiyan (Cze)

- Luxembourg won the toss and elected to bat.
- Sonny Clephane, Ushan Thenannahelage (Cze) and Anshuman Bhadauria (Lux) all made their T20I debuts.

9 July 2022
10:00
Scorecard

Czech Republic; 182/6 (20 overs)	v	Austria; 183/6 (19.4 overs)
Sabawoon Davizi 111* (71); Abdullah Akbarjan 2/28 (4 overs); Aqib Iqbal 2/28 (4 overs)		Mirza Ahsan 57 (28); Naveed Ahmed 2/22 (4 overs)

Austria won by 4 wickets
Scott Page Field, Vinoř Cricket Ground, Prague
Umpires: Richard Eames (Lux) and Chris Tebb (Cze)
Player of the match: Shahil Momin (Aut)

- Austria won the toss and elected to field.
- Tripurari Lal (Cze) made his T20I debut.

9 July 2022
15:00
Scorecard

Austria; 115/3 (12.1 overs)	v	Luxembourg; 84/4 (10 overs)
Razmal Shigiwal 48* (23); Pankaj Malav 2/19 (3 overs)		Joost Mees 23* (16); Aqib Iqbal 2/7 (2 overs)

Austria won by 35 runs (DLS method)
Scott Page Field, Vinoř Cricket Ground, Prague
Umpires: Sunil Gowda (Ger) and Chris Tebb (Cze)
Player of the match: Razmal Shigiwal (Aut)

- Luxembourg won the toss and elected to field.
- Luxembourg were set a revised target of 120 runs from 10 overs due to rain.

10 July 2022
10:00
Scorecard

Czech Republic; 209/6 (20 overs)	v	Luxembourg; 173/9 (20 overs)
Dylan Steyn 64 (44); Pankaj Malav 2/31 (4 overs)		James Barker 44 (36); Arun Ashokan 3/32 (4 overs)

Czech Republic won by 36 runs
Scott Page Field, Vinoř Cricket Ground, Prague
Umpires: Sunil Gowda (Ger) and Chris Tebb (Cze)
Player of the match: Sudesh Wickramasekara (Cze)

- Czech Republic won the toss and elected to bat.
- Kranthi Venkataswamy (Cze) and Ansh Trivedi (Lux) both made their T20I debuts.

10 July 2022
15:00
Scorecard

Austria; 146/8 (20 overs)	v	Czech Republic; 150/4 (18.4 overs)
Aqib Iqbal 40 (42); Naveed Ahmed 1/12 (4 overs)		Sabawoon Davizi 56 (43); Aqib Iqbal 1/23 (4 overs)

Czech Republic won by 6 wickets
Scott Page Field, Vinoř Cricket Ground, Prague
Umpires: Richard Eames (Lux) and Sunil Gowda (Ger)
Player of the match: Arun Ashokan (Cze)

- Czech Republic won the toss and elected to field.
- Osman Khan (Aut) made his T20I debut.
