= Austrian cricket team in Belgium in 2021 =

International cricket tour

Austria cricket team in Belgium in 2021
	Belgium	Austria
- Dates: 24 – 25 July 2021
Captains	Sheraz Sheikh	Razmal Shigiwal

Twenty20 International series
- Results: Belgium won the 3-match series 2–1
Most runs	Saber Zakhil (135)	Razmal Shigiwal (98)
Most wickets	Shagharai Sefat (4)	Aqib Iqbal (8)

The Austria cricket team toured Belgium in July 2021 to play three Twenty20 International (T20I) matches at the Royal Brussels Cricket Club in Waterloo. The series was originally due to be held in May 2021, but was postponed due to the COVID-19 pandemic.

Belgium head coach Corey Rutgers resigned shortly before the series after a selection dispute resulted in ten of the players who toured Malta earlier in July either being dropped or later withdrawing from the squad to face Austria.

Belgium won the series 2–1.

== Squads ==
Belgium	Austria
Sheraz Sheikh (c); Maqsood Ahmad; Saqlain Ali; Murid Ekrami; Mamoon Latif; Faisal Mehmood; Sherul Mehta; Aziz Mohammad; Muhammad Muneeb; Burhan Niaz; Abdul Rashid; Ali Raza (wk); Adnan Razzaq; Shagharai Sefat; Saber Zakhil	Razmal Shigiwal (c); Abdullah Akbarjan; Arsalan Arif; Imran Asif; Abrar Bilal (wk); Iqbal Hossain; Aqib Iqbal; Lakmal Kasturiarachchige; Shahil Momin; Amit Nathwani; Mark Simpson-Parker; Umair Tariq; Sahel Zadran; Waqar Zalmai

== T20I series ==
=== 1st T20I ===
24 July 2021
10:00
Scorecard

Austria; 195/7 (20 overs)	v	Belgium; 196/3 (18 overs)
Shahil Momin 61 (41); Shagharai Sefat 3/33 (4 overs)		Muhammad Muneeb 70* (53); Sahel Zadran 2/28 (3 overs)

Belgium won by 7 wickets
Royal Brussels Cricket Club, Waterloo
Umpires: Rehman Hussain (Bel) and Jahan Gir Jhan (Bel)

- Belgium won the toss and elected to field.
- Maqsood Ahmad, Faisal Mehmood, Ali Raza, Shagharai Sefat (Bel), Iqbal Hossain, Shahil Momin and Waqar Zalmai (Aut) all made their T20I debuts.

=== 2nd T20I ===
24 July 2021
15:00
Scorecard

Belgium; 146/8 (20 overs)	v	Austria; 37/3 (6.1 overs)
Saber Zakhil 100* (47); Aqib Iqbal 5/5 (4 overs)		Razmal Shigiwal 17* (14); Murid Ekrami 2/18 (3 overs)

Belgium won by 12 runs (DLS method)
Royal Brussels Cricket Club, Waterloo
Umpires: Shashidhar Gunna (Bel) and Steve Tripp (Bel)

- Austria won the toss and elected to field.
- No further play was possible due to rain.
- Aqib Iqbal became the first bowler for Austria to take a five-wicket haul in T20Is.
- Saber Zakhil (Bel) scored his first century in T20Is.
- Saber Zakhil (Bel) also became the first cricketer batting at number 8 to score a century in T20Is.
- The 132-run partnership between Saber Zakhil and Saqlain Ali in the Belgium innings was a record for the ninth wicket in T20Is.

=== 3rd T20I ===
25 July 2021
10:00
Scorecard

Belgium; 103/9 (20 overs)	v	Austria; 104/4 (17.2 overs)
Ali Raza 31* (23); Aqib Iqbal 3/25 (4 overs)		Abrar Bilal 27* (20); Aziz Mohammad 1/13 (3 overs)

Austria won by 6 wickets
Royal Brussels Cricket Club, Waterloo
Umpires: Steve Tripp (Bel) and Jahan Gir Jhan (Bel)

- Belgium won the toss and elected to bat.
- Adnan Razzaq (Bel) made his T20I debut.
