= 2021 Central Europe Cup =

International cricket tournament

- Dates: 21 – 23 May 2021
- Administrator: Czech Cricket Union
- Cricket format: Twenty20 International
- Host: Czech Republic
- Champions: Austria (1st title)
- Participants: 3
- Matches: 6
- Most runs: (Czech Republic) Sabawoon Davizi (162)
- Most wickets: (Luxembourg) Vikram Vijh (6) (Czech Republic) Paul Taylor (6)

The 2021 Central Europe Cup was a Twenty20 International (T20I) cricket tournament played in Prague from 21 to 23 May 2021. The participating teams were the hosts Czech Republic, along with Austria and Luxembourg. Malta were also due to take part, but were forced to withdraw on 6 May due to COVID-19 restrictions. The tournament was played in a double round-robin format, with all matches hosted at the Vinoř Cricket Ground in Prague.

This was the seventh edition of the Central Europe Cup and the first to have T20I status. These were the first official T20I matches to be played in the Czech Republic since the International Cricket Council (ICC) granted full T20I status to all competitive matches between its members from 1 January 2019. The 2020 edition would have had T20I status but was cancelled due to the COVID-19 pandemic. The Czechs were the defending champions, having defeated Hungary in the final of the 2019 edition. Austria won the tournament on their debut at the Central Europe Cup, winning three of their four matches.

== Squads ==
| Austria | Czech Republic | Luxembourg |
|---|---|---|
| Razmal Shigiwal (c); Rayhaan Ahmed (wk); Mirza Ahsan; Zeshan Arif; Imran Asif; Aman Habibullah; Zabiullah Ibrahimkhel; Aqib Iqbal; Kunal Joshi; Lakmal Kasturiarachchige; Jaweed Sadran; Mark Simpson-Parker; Umair Tariq; Navin Wijesekera; Sahel Zadran; Bilal Zalmai | Sudesh Wickramasekara (c); Kushalkumar Mendon (vc); Hilal Ahmad (wk); Naveed Ahmed; Arun Ashokan; Sabawoon Davizi; ~~Abul Farhad~~; Sahil Grover (wk); Edward Knowles (wk); Sagar Madhireddy; ~~Zahid Mahmood~~; Smit Patel; Paul Taylor; Satyajit Sengupta; Ali Waqar; Sameera Waththage | Joost Mees (c, wk); James Barker; Timothy Barker; William Cope; Mohit Dixit; Atif Kamal; Pankaj Malav; Ankush Nanda; Aanand Pandey; Shameek Vats; Girish Venkateswaran; Vikram Vijh; Roshan Vishwanath; Tony Whiteman |

The Czech squad was announced on 21 April 2021 with some notable omissions including all-rounder Honey Gori, fast bowler Kyle Gilham and opening batter Sumit Pokhriyal, due to a lack of availability. On 18 May 2021, the Czechs announced changes to their squad due to players originally selected becoming unavailable; Abul Farhad and Zahid Mahmood were replaced by Sagar Madhireddy and Smit Patel.

== Points table ==
| Team | P | W | L | T | NR | Pts | NRR |
|---|---|---|---|---|---|---|---|
| Austria | 4 | 3 | 1 | 0 | 0 | 12 | +1.370 |
| Luxembourg | 4 | 2 | 2 | 0 | 0 | 8 | –0.015 |
| Czech Republic | 4 | 1 | 3 | 0 | 0 | 4 | –1.151 |

== Fixtures ==
21 May 2021
10:00
Scorecard

| Luxembourg; 126/5 (20 overs) | v | Czech Republic; 127/1 (18.2 overs) |
| Timothy Barker 60 (42); Paul Taylor 2/19 (4 overs) | | Sabawoon Davizi 57 (33); Vikram Vijh 1/21 (4 overs) |

Czech Republic won by 9 wickets
Scott Page Field, Vinoř Cricket Ground, Prague
Umpires: Steve Tripp (Bel) and Peter Vincent (Cze)

- Czech Republic won the toss and elected to field.
- Sahil Grover, Smit Patel, Satyajit Sengupta, Ali Waqar (Cze) and Aanand Pandey (Lux) all made their T20I debuts.

21 May 2021
14:30
Scorecard

| Luxembourg; 143/5 (20 overs) | v | Austria; 59/3 (7.3 overs) |
| Timothy Barker 35 (32); Razmal Shigiwal 2/28 (4 overs) | | Mark Simpson-Parker 23 (19); Vikram Vijh 2/8 (1.3 overs) |

Austria won by 5 runs (DLS method)
Scott Page Field, Vinoř Cricket Ground, Prague
Umpires: Joe Foster (Cze) and Peter Vincent (Cze)

- Luxembourg won the toss and elected to bat.
- No further play was possible due to rain.
- Rayhaan Ahmed, Zabiullah Ibrahimkhel, Lakmal Kasturiarachchige, Jaweed Sadran, Navin Wijesekera and Sahel Zadran (Aut) all made their T20I debuts.

22 May 2021
10:00
Scorecard

| Austria; 162/6 (20 overs) | v | Czech Republic; 84 (18.1 overs) |
| Mirza Ahsan 52* (22); Ali Waqar 1/19 (4 overs) | | Naveed Ahmed 21 (26); Jaweed Sadran 2/8 (2.1 overs) |

Austria won by 78 runs
Scott Page Field, Vinoř Cricket Ground, Prague
Umpires: Joe Foster (Cze) and Steve Tripp (Bel)

- Czech Republic won the toss and elected to field.

22 May 2021
14:30
Scorecard

| Czech Republic; 161/7 (20 overs) | v | Luxembourg; 165/4 (18.4 overs) |
| Sabawoon Davizi 48 (31); Atif Kamal 3/23 (4 overs) | | Timothy Barker 47 (30); Paul Taylor 2/29 (3 overs) |

Luxembourg won by 6 wickets
Scott Page Field, Vinoř Cricket Ground, Prague
Umpires: Steve Tripp (Bel) and Peter Vincent (Cze)

- Luxembourg won the toss and elected to field.

23 May 2021
10:00
Scorecard

| Austria; 179/5 (20 overs) | v | Luxembourg; 180/5 (19.4 overs) |
| Razmal Shigiwal 70 (49); Vikram Vijh 3/30 (4 overs) | | Joost Mees 42 (31); Bilal Zalmai 1/29 (4 overs) |

Luxembourg won by 5 wickets
Scott Page Field, Vinoř Cricket Ground, Prague
Umpires: Joe Foster (Cze) and Peter Vincent (Lux)

- Austria won the toss and elected to bat.

23 May 2021
14:30
Scorecard

| Czech Republic; 156/4 (17 overs) | v | Austria; 161/6 (16.2 overs) |
| Sabawoon Davizi 57 (36); Bilal Zalmai 2/26 (4 overs) | | Mark Simpson-Parker 65* (36); Sabawoon Davizi 2/13 (3 overs) |

Austria won by 4 wickets (DLS method)
Scott Page Field, Vinoř Cricket Ground, Prague
Umpires: Joe Foster (Cze) and Steve Tripp (Bel)

- Czech Republic won the toss and elected to bat.
- Austria were set a revised target of 159 runs from 17 overs due to rain.
- Imran Asif and Umair Tariq (Aut) both made their T20I debuts.
