= Croatia women's national cricket team =

Cricket team

Croatia
- Association: Croatian Cricket Federation

Personnel
- Captain: Erin Vukusic

International Cricket Council
- ICC status: Associate member (2017)
- ICC region: Europe
ICC Rankings	Current	Best-ever
T20I	53rd	51st (15 May 2025)

T20 Internationals
- First T20I: v Czech Republic at Vinoř Cricket Ground, Prague; 14 June 2024
- Last T20I: v Serbia at Lisicji Jarak Cricket Ground, Belgrade; 6 September 2026
T20Is	Played	Won/Lost
Total	14	7/7 (0 ties, 0 no results)
This year	4	4/0 (0 ties, 0 no results)
- As of 6 September 2026

The Croatia national women's cricket team is the team that represents Croatia in international women's cricket. In April 2018, the International Cricket Council (ICC) granted full Women's Twenty20 International (WT20I) status to all its members. Therefore, all Twenty20 matches that will be played between Croatia women and other ICC members after 1 July 2018 have been eligible for full WT20I status.

In July 2019, the International Cricket Council (ICC) suspended the Croatian Cricket Federation, with the team barred from taking part in ICC events. However, in July 2021, Croatian Cricket Federation's frozen status was lifted by ICC, upon the receipt of appropriate paperwork. This enables Croatia to take part in ICC events from now on.

== Records and statistics ==
International Match Summary — Croatia Women

Last updated 6 September 2026

Playing Record
Format	M	W	L	T	NR	Inaugural Match
Twenty20 Internationals	14	7	7	0	0	14 June 2024

=== Twenty20 International ===
- Highest team total: 191/1 v Czech Republic on 14 June 2024 at Vinoř Cricket Ground, Prague, Czech Republic.
- Highest individual score: 85*, Erin Vukusic v Czech Republic on 14 June 2024 at Vinoř Cricket Ground, Prague, Czech Republic.
- Best individual bowling figures: 3/27, Erin Vukusic v Gibraltar on 15 June 2024 at Vinoř Cricket Ground, Prague, Czech Republic.

T20I record versus other nations

Records complete to WT20I #3004. Last updated 6 September 2026.

Opponent	M	W	L	T	NR	First match	First win
ICC Associate members
Bulgaria	2	2	0	0	0	4 September 2026	4 September 2026
Czech Republic	2	2	0	0	0	14 June 2024	14 June 2024
Gibraltar	2	1	1	0	0	15 June 2024	15 June 2024
Malta	2	0	2	0	0	5 May 2025	
Serbia	2	2	0	0	0	4 September 2026	4 September 2026
Spain	4	0	4	0	0	26 October 2024	

== Tournament history ==
=== ICC Women's World Cup ===
World Cup record
Year	Round	Position	GP	W	L	T	NR
(England) 1973	Did not qualify/No women's ODI status						
(India) 1978	Did not qualify/No women's ODI status						
(New Zealand) 1982	Did not qualify/No women's ODI status						
(Australia) 1988	Did not qualify/No women's ODI status						
(England) 1993	Did not qualify/No women's ODI status						
(India) 1997	Did not qualify/No women's ODI status						
(New Zealand) 2000	Did not qualify/No women's ODI status						
(South Africa) 2005	Did not qualify/No women's ODI status						
(Australia) 2009	Did not qualify/No women's ODI status						
(India) 2013	Did not qualify/No women's ODI status						
(England) 2017	Did not qualify/No women's ODI status						
(New Zealand) 2022	Did not qualify/No women's ODI status						
(India) 2025	Did not qualify/No women's ODI status						
Total	0/12	0 Titles	0	0	0	0	0

=== ICC Women's World T20 ===
Twenty20 World Cup Record
Year	Round	Position	GP	W	L	T	NR
(England) 2009	Did not qualify						
(Cricket West Indies) 2010	Did not qualify						
(Sri Lanka) 2012	Did not qualify						
(Bangladesh) 2014	Did not qualify						
(India) 2016	Did not qualify						
(Cricket West Indies) 2018	Did not qualify						
(Australia) 2020	Did not qualify						
(South Africa) 2023	Did not qualify						
(United Arab Emirates) 2024	Did not qualify						
(England) 2026	Did not qualify						
Total	0/10	0 Titles	0	0	0	0	0

=== ICC Women's World Twenty20 Europe Qualifier ===
ICC Women's Twenty20 Qualifier Europe records
Year	Round	Position	GP	W	L	T	NR
(Spain) 2019	Did not participate						
(Spain) 2021	Did not participate						
(Jersey) 2023	Did not participate						
(Italy) 2025	Did not participate						
Total	0/4	0 Title	0	0	0	0	0

=== Women's European Cricket Championship ===
Women's European Cricket Championship records
Year	Round	Position	GP	W	L	T	NR
(Denmark) 1989	Did not participate						
(England) 1990	Did not participate						
(Netherlands) 1991	Did not participate						
(Republic of Ireland) 1995	Did not participate						
(Denmark) 1999	Did not participate						
(England) 2001	Did not participate						
(Wales) 2005	Did not participate						
(Netherlands) 2007	Did not participate						
(Republic of Ireland) 2009	Did not participate						
(Scotland) 2010	Did not participate						
(Netherlands) 2011	Did not participate						
(England) 2014	Did not participate						
Total	0/12	0 Title	0	0	0	0	0

=== Cricket at Summer Olympics Games ===
Cricket at Summer Olympics records
Host Year	Round	Position	GP	W	L	T	NR
(United States) 2028	To be determined						
(Australia) 2032	To be determined						
Total	–	0 Title	0	0	0	0	0

=== ICC Women's T20 Champions Trophy ===
ICC Women's T20 Champions Trophy records
Host Year	Round	Position	GP	W	L	T	NR
(Sri Lanka) 2027	To be determined						
2031	To be determined						
Total	–	0 Title	0	0	0	0	0

== See also ==
- List of Croatia women Twenty20 International cricketers
