= Hungarian cricket team in Austria in 2022 =

International cricket tour

	Austria	Hungary
- Dates: 4 – 5 June 2022
Captains	Razmal Shigiwal	Khaibar Deldar

Twenty20 International series
- Results: 3-match series drawn 1–1
Most runs	Razmal Shigiwal (137)	Zeeshan Kukikhel (162)
Most wickets	Shahil Momin (8)	Sandeep Mohandas (3); Ali Yalmaz (3)

The Hungary cricket team toured Austria from 4 to 5 June 2022, to play a three-match Twenty20 International (T20I) bilateral series against hosts Austria. The venue for all of the matches was Seebarn Cricket Ground. The series provided both teams with preparation for the 2022–23 ICC Men's T20 World Cup Europe Qualifier subregional tournaments. The series finished 1–1 with Austria winning the first game by 105 runs, the second game ending in a no result, and Hungary winning the final match by 4 wickets.

== Squads ==
Austria	Hungary
Razmal Shigiwal (c); Mirza Ahsan; Abdullah Akbarjan; Arsalan Arif (wk); Mehar Cheema (wk); Itibarshah Deedar; Iqbal Hossain; Shahil Momin; Amit Nathwani; Jaweed Sadran; Mark Simpson-Parker; Umair Tariq; Ahsan Yousuf; Sahel Zadran	Khaibar Deldar (c); Bhavani Adapaka; Abhishek Ahuja (wk); Kalum Akurugoda; Satyadeep Ashwathnarayana; Ali Farasat; Mark Fontaine; Zeeshan Kukikhel; Akramullah Malikzada; Harshvardhan Mandhyan; Sandeep Mohandas; Ali Yalmaz

== T20I series ==
=== 1st T20I ===
4 June 2022
11:30
Scorecard

Austria; 201/5 (20 overs)	v	Hungary; 96 (17.3 overs)
Mirza Ahsan 49 (19); Mark Fontaine 1/17 (2 overs)		Abhishek Ahuja 23 (21); Shahil Momin 4/19 (3.3 overs)

Austria won by 105 runs
Seebarn Cricket Ground, Lower Austria
Umpires: Shubh Anand (Hun) and Aravindan Ganeshan (Aut)
Player of the match: Mirza Ahsan (Aut)

- Austria won the toss and elected to bat.
- Mehar Cheema, Ahsan Yousuf (Aut) and Kalum Akurugoda (Hun) all made their T20I debuts.

=== 2nd T20I ===
4 June 2022
15:30
Scorecard

Hungary; 89 (16 overs)	v	Austria
Satyadeep Ashwathnarayana 15 (19); Shahil Momin 4/22 (4 overs)

No result
Seebarn Cricket Ground, Lower Austria
Umpires: Aravindan Ganeshan (Aut) and Gursewak Singh (Aut)

- Austria won the toss and elected to field.
- No further play was possible due to rain.
- Itibarshah Deedar (Aut) made his T20I debut.

=== 3rd T20I ===
5 June 2022
11:30
Scorecard

Austria; 196/6 (20 overs)	v	Hungary; 197/6 (19 overs)
Razmal Shigiwal 95* (47); Sandeep Mohandas 3/26 (4 overs)		Zeeshan Kukikhel 137 (49); Abdullah Akbarjan 1/19 (3 overs)

Hungary won by 4 wickets
Seebarn Cricket Ground, Lower Austria
Umpires: Shubh Anand (Hun) and Aravindan Ganeshan (Aut)
Player of the match: Zeeshan Kukikhel (Hun)

- Austria won the toss and elected to bat.
- Zeeshan Kukikhel became the first player for Hungary to score a century in T20Is.
- Zeeshan Kukikhel (Hun) achieved the record score for a batter in the second innings of a T20I.
