= Central Europe Cup =

International cricket tournament

- Administrator: Czech Cricket Union
- Format: Twenty20 (since 2019)
- First edition: 2014
- Latest edition: 2023
- Current champion: Czech Republic (4th title)
- Most successful: Czech Republic (4 titles)

The Central Europe Cup is an international men's cricket tournament played annually in Prague, Czech Republic, between invited teams from across central Europe. Organized by the Czech Cricket Union, and played at the Vinoř Cricket Ground, the tournament was first held in 2014 as a 50-over tournament and retained this format until it was changed to Twenty20 in 2019.

Poland won the inaugural event in 2014, finishing ahead of Switzerland on the basis of their head-to-head record after the two teams ended the tournament level on points. The Poles retained the title in 2015. The 2016 tournament featured only three teams, with Poland not featuring, and was won by the hosts for the first time. Poland returned in 2017 and won the tournament for a third time. Switzerland claimed the title in 2018 winning all three of their matches.

The Czechs won the 2019 edition, defeating Hungary in the final. The 2020 edition was scheduled to take place in September and would have been the first to have official Twenty20 International (T20I) status since the International Cricket Council granted this status to all eligible matches played between its Members from January 2019. The 2020 edition would also have included more teams that previous editions, with six national teams taking part – Austria, Belgium, Hungary, Luxembourg, Malta, and the hosts Czech Republic. However, the tournament was cancelled on 14 September 2020 due to a worsening of the COVID-19 pandemic in the region.

The 2021 edition was played in Prague between 21 and 23 May 2021. The participating teams were the hosts Czech Republic, along with Austria and Luxembourg. Malta were also due to take part, but were forced to withdraw due to COVID-19 restrictions. This was the seventh edition of the Central Europe Cup and the first to have T20I status. Austria won the tournament for the first time. Despite the original intent to expand the tournament to 6 teams for this 7th edition, the Central Europe Cup has always been contested with 3 teams since the 2021 edition.

== Results ==
Year	Result				Refs
Year	Winner	Runner-up	Third	Fourth	Refs
2014	Poland	Switzerland	Czech Republic	Luxembourg	
2015	Poland	Sweden	Malta	Czech Republic	
2016	Czech Republic	Switzerland	Estonia	N/A	
2017	Poland	Luxembourg	Czech Republic	Switzerland	
2018	Switzerland	(Czech Republic) Czech Eagles	Czech Republic	Luxembourg	
2019	Czech Republic	Hungary	Switzerland	Latvia	
2021	Austria	Luxembourg	Czech Republic	N/A	
2022	Czech Republic	Austria	Luxembourg	N/A	
2023	Czech Republic	Hungary	N/A	N/A	
2025	Austria	Norway	Czech Republic	N/A	

== Performance by team ==
Legend

- 1st – Champions
- 2nd – Runners-up
- 3rd – Third place
- Q – Qualified

Team	2014	2015	2016	2017	2018	2019	2021	2022	2023	2025	Total 10
Austria	—	—	—	—	—	—	1st	2nd	—	1st	3
Czech Republic	3rd	4th	1st	3rd	3rd	1st	3rd	1st	1st	3rd	10
(Czech Republic) Czech Eagles	—	—	—	—	2nd	—	—	—	—	—	1
Estonia	—	—	3rd	—	—	—	—	—	—	—	1
Hungary	—	—	—	—	—	2nd	—	—	2nd	—	2
Latvia	—	—	—	—	—	4th	—	—	—	—	1
Luxembourg	4th	—	—	2nd	4th	—	2nd	3rd	—	—	5
Malta	—	3rd	—	—	—	—	—	—	—	—	1
Norway	—	—	—	—	—	—	—	—	—	2nd	1
Poland	1st	1st	—	1st	—	—	—	—	—	—	3
Sweden	—	2nd	—	—	—	—	—	—	—	—	1
Switzerland	2nd	—	2nd	4th	1st	3rd	—	—	—	—	5
