= List of Croatia women Twenty20 International cricketers =

This is a list of Croatia women Twenty20 International cricketers. A Women's Twenty20 International (WT20I) is an international cricket match between two representative teams. A T20I is played under the rules of Twenty20 cricket. In April 2018, the International Cricket Council (ICC) granted full international status to Twenty20 women's matches played between member sides from 1 July 2018 onwards. Croatia women played their first WT20I on 14 June 2024 against Czech Republic.

The list is arranged in the order in which each player won her first Twenty20 cap. Where more than one player won her first Twenty20 cap in the same match, those players are listed alphabetically by surname.

== Key ==
General

- ‡ – Captain
- † – Wicket-keeper
- First – Year of debut
- Last – Year of latest game
- Mat – Number of matches played

Batting

- Runs – Runs scored in career
- HS – Highest score
- Avg – Runs scored per dismissal
- * – Batsman remained not out
- 50 – Half-centuries scored
- 100 – Centuries scored

Bowling

- Balls – Balls bowled in career
- Wkt – Wickets taken in career
- BBI – Best bowling in an innings
- Ave – Average runs per wicket

Fielding

- Ca – Catches taken
- St – Stumpings affected

== Players ==
Statistics are correct as of 6 September 2026.

General					Batting				Bowling				Fielding		Ref
No.	Name	First	Last	Mat	Runs	HS	Avg	50	Balls	Wkt	BBI	Ave	Ca	St	Ref
1	Anushka Charles	2024	2024	3	1	1	1.00	0	6	0	–	–	0	0	
2	Yevheniia Korniienko	2024	2024	3	6	6*	–	0	6	0	–	–	0	0	
3	Lidija Krvaric	2024	2026	14	185	57*	15.41	1	273	14	3/15	14.35	2	0	
4	Sema Kucuksucu	2024	2025	9	4	3*	0.66	0	108	1	1/38	139.00	0	0	
5	Helen Leko	2024	2026	14	148	30*	12.33	0	299	14	4/4	15.42	3	0	
6	Morana Modric	2024	2026	14	41	25	4.55	0	56	1	1/38	81.00	0	0	
7	Valentina Romani	2024	2026	12	7	3*	1.16	0	12	0	–	–	2	0	
8	Sili Sebastian†	2024	2026	10	4	2*	1.00	0	–	–	–	–	5	0	
9	Pavla Senjug	2024	2026	14	100	27	8.33	0	281	5	2/33	54.50	1	0	
10	Erin Vukusic‡	2024	2024	4	197	85*	98.50	2	72	4	3/27	13.25	2	0	
11	Ivana Zigante	2024	2024	7	17	12*	4.25	0	–	–	–	–	1	0	
12	Priyanka Reddy	2024	2024	3	0	0	0.00	0	–	–	–	–	0	0	
13	Suzanna Filipi	2024	2024	4	0*	0	0.00	0	–	–	–	–	0	0	
14	Sanja Peles	2024	2026	8	14	6	2.33	0	12	0	–	–	0	0	
15	Anita Skoric	2024	2024	4	2	2	0.50	0	–	–	–	–	0	0	
16	Helena Bosnic	2025	2026	5	29	14	14.50	0	–	–	–	–	0	0	
17	Mia Durdevac	2025	2026	6	111	68*	55.50	1	111	5	3/14	18.40	0	0	
18	Ines Majdancic†	2025	2026	6	35	22	11.66	0	–	–	–	–	1	0	
19	Dora Pavelic	2025	2026	6	39	29	13.00	0	126	12	3/16	8.91	2	0	
20	Lada Sviben	2025	2025	2	4	4	4.00	0	–	–	–	–	0	0	
21	Ilonka Smotara	2025	2025	1	0	0	0.00	0	30	0	–	–	0	0	
22	Tea Males	2026	2026	3	1	1*	–	0	–	–	–	–	0	0	
23	Ilonka Smotara	2026	2026	2	–	–	–	–	–	–	–	–	0	0	
