= List of Czech Republic women Twenty20 International cricketers =

This is a list of Czech Republic women Twenty20 International cricketers. A Women's Twenty20 International (WT20I) is an international cricket match between two representative teams. A T20I is played under the rules of Twenty20 cricket. In April 2018, the International Cricket Council (ICC) granted full international status to Twenty20 women's matches played between member sides from 1 July 2018 onwards. Czech Republic women played their first WT20I on 8 June 2024 against Austria.

The list is arranged in the order in which each player won her first Twenty20 cap. Where more than one player won her first Twenty20 cap in the same match, those players are listed alphabetically by surname.

== Key ==
General

- ‡ – Captain
- † – Wicket-keeper
- First – Year of debut
- Last – Year of latest game
- Mat – Number of matches played

Batting

- Runs – Runs scored in career
- HS – Highest score
- Avg – Runs scored per dismissal
- * – Batsman remained not out
- 50 – Half-centuries scored
- 100 – Centuries scored

Bowling

- Balls – Balls bowled in career
- Wkt – Wickets taken in career
- BBI – Best bowling in an innings
- Ave – Average runs per wicket

Fielding

- Ca – Catches taken
- St – Stumpings affected

== Players ==
Statistics are correct as of 6 September 2026.

General					Batting				Bowling				Fielding		Ref
No.	Name	First	Last	Mat	Runs	HS	Avg	50	Balls	Wkt	BBI	Ave	Ca	St	Ref
1	Kristyna Bulirova	2024	2024	2	2	2	1.00	0	18	0	–	–	0	0	
2	Sarka Kolcunova	2024	2025	18	22	8	3.14	0	336	11	4/17	38.81	1	0	
3	Tereza Kolcunova‡	2024	2026	17	163	52	10.86	1	322	5	1/11	77.80	4	0	
4	Erika Kuncova	2024	2026	31	248	37	11.80	0	552	21	3/11	28.09	8	0	
5	Anushree Kshirsagar	2024	2024	7	23	7	4.60	0	132	4	2/24	45.00	0	0	
6	Magda Martincova†	2024	2024	3	3	2	3.00	0	12	1	1/12	21.00	0	0	
7	Rachel Pavlickova†	2024	2026	27	195	30	7.80	0	353	9	2/21	48.66	2	0	
8	Katerina Tesarikova‡	2024	2026	27	385	67*	16.73	2	6	0	–	–	4	0	
9	Zuzana Tumpachova	2024	2024	3	1	1	0.50	0	54	2	2/23	41.00	0	0	
10	Magdalena Ulmanova	2024	2024	5	5	5	2.50	0	78	4	2/22	26.00	1	0	
11	Vlasti Volfova	2024	2025	7	19	8*	4.75	0	6	0	–	–	0	0	
12	Pratibha Choudhary†	2024	2026	11	26	10*	2.88	0	–	–	–	–	0	0	
13	Zuzana Flamikova	2024	2024	2	0	0	0.00	0	–	–	–	–	0	0	
14	Zuzana Franova†	2024	2026	25	157	34	9.23	0	–	–	–	–	6	1	
15	Jana Kominkova	2024	2026	24	136	22	7.55	0	150	4	2/23	52.25	1	0	
16	Vina Wadini	2024	2024	1	–	–	–	–	–	–	–	–	0	0	
17	Avaniben Joshi	2024	2024	2	11	9*	11.00	0	30	0	–	–	0	0	
18	Romana Mikulaskova	2024	2025	3	5	3*	0.00	0	–	–	–	–	0	0	
19	Bara Pavlinakova	2024	2024	2	2	2*	–	0	–	–	–	–	0	0	
20	Olga Hamrikova	2025	2025	9	20	8	2.50	0	–	–	–	–	0	0	
21	Klara Kisova	2025	2026	18	1	1	0.14	0	24	0	–	–	1	0	
22	Divya Mehtani	2025	2026	7	4	3	1.00	0	–	–	–	–	2	0	
23	Eva Konasova	2025	2026	10	4	4*	0.80	0	60	2	2/25	41.50	0	0	
24	Mansi Parmar	2025	2026	9	18	14	3.60	0	52	1	1/26	60.00	1	0	
25	Josephine Souckova	2025	2026	14	64	29*	8.00	0	6	0	–	–	2	0	
26	Sowjanya Talamarla	2025	2026	14	103	38	11.44	0	287	16	3/12	16.18	2	0	
27	Adela Pavlickova	2025	2026	4	1	1	1.00	0	–	–	–	–	0	0	
28	Michaela Trejbalova†	2025	2025	4	2	1*	4.00	0	–	–	–	–	2	0	
29	Karolina Hruskova	2025	2025	2	1	1	0.50	0	–	–	–	–	0	0	
30	Desika Marikova-Moodley	2026	2026	12	16	11*	5.33	0	202	13	3/14	15.53	3	0	
31	Viola Komeda	2026	2026	12	39	16*	7.80	0	241	22	5/14	9.09	1	0	
32	Farwa Baber	2026	2026	7	118	28*	23.60	0	84	1	1/11	79.00	1	0	
33	Veronika Nevolova	2026	2026	2	2	2	2.00	0	–	–	–	–	0	0	
