= Czech Republic women's national cricket team =

Cricket team

Czech Republic
- Flag of the Czech Republic
- Association: Czech Cricket Union

Personnel
- Captain: Tereza Kolcunova

International Cricket Council
- ICC status: Associate member (2017)
- ICC region: Europe
| ICC Rankings | Current | Best-ever |
| T20I | 72nd | 72nd (15 May 2025) |

T20 Internationals
- First T20I: v. Austria at Seebarn Cricket Ground, Lower Austria; 8 June 2024
- Last T20I: v. Portugal at Vinoř Cricket Ground, Prague; 6 September 2026
| T20Is | Played | Won/Lost |
| Total | 31 | 8/23 (0 ties, 0 no results) |
| This year | 12 | 8/4 (0 ties, 0 no results) |
- As of 6 September 2026

The Czech Republic national women's cricket team is the team that represents Czech Republic in international women's cricket. In April 2018, the International Cricket Council (ICC) granted full Women's Twenty20 International (WT20I) status to all its members. Therefore, all Twenty20 matches that will be played between Czech Republic women and other ICC members after 1 July 2018 have been eligible for full WT20I status. Czech Republic played their first ever WT20I on 8 June 2024 against Austria.

== Records and statistics ==
International Match Summary — Czech Republic Women

Last updated 6 September 2026

Playing Record
| Format | M | W | L | T | NR | Inaugural Match |
| Twenty20 Internationals | 31 | 8 | 23 | 0 | 0 | 8 June 2024 |

=== Twenty20 International ===
- Highest team total: 120/6 v Croatia on 14 June 2024 at Vinoř Cricket Ground, Prague, Czech Republic.
- Highest individual score: 52, Tereza Kolcunova v Croatia on 15 June 2024 at Vinoř Cricket Ground, Prague, Czech Republic.
- Best individual bowling figures: 4/17, Sarka Kolcunova v Austria on 9 June 2024 at Seebarn Cricket Ground, Austria.

T20I record versus other nations

Records complete to WT20I #3005. Last updated 6 September 2026.

| Opponent | M | W | L | T | NR | First match | First win |
|---|---|---|---|---|---|---|---|
ICC Associate members
| Austria | 6 | 0 | 6 | 0 | 0 | 8 June 2024 | |
| Belgium | 2 | 2 | 0 | 0 | 0 | 4 September 2026 | 4 September 2026 |
| Croatia | 2 | 0 | 2 | 0 | 0 | 14 June 2024 | |
| Cyprus | 5 | 0 | 5 | 0 | 0 | 2 May 2025 | |
| Estonia | 3 | 0 | 3 | 0 | 0 | 6 September 2025 | |
| Gibraltar | 4 | 0 | 4 | 0 | 0 | 14 June 2024 | |
| Guernsey | 1 | 0 | 1 | 0 | 0 | 29 August 2026 | |
| Luxembourg | 2 | 2 | 0 | 0 | 0 | 26 June 2026 | 26 June 2026 |
| Norway | 2 | 2 | 0 | 0 | 0 | 27 June 2026 | 27 June 2026 |
| Portugal | 3 | 2 | 1 | 0 | 0 | 4 September 2026 | 4 September 2026 |
| Turkey | 1 | 0 | 1 | 0 | 0 | 27 August 2026 | |

== See also ==
- List of Czech Republic women Twenty20 International cricketers
