= Vinoř =

- Municipal District of Prague
- Prague-Vinoř
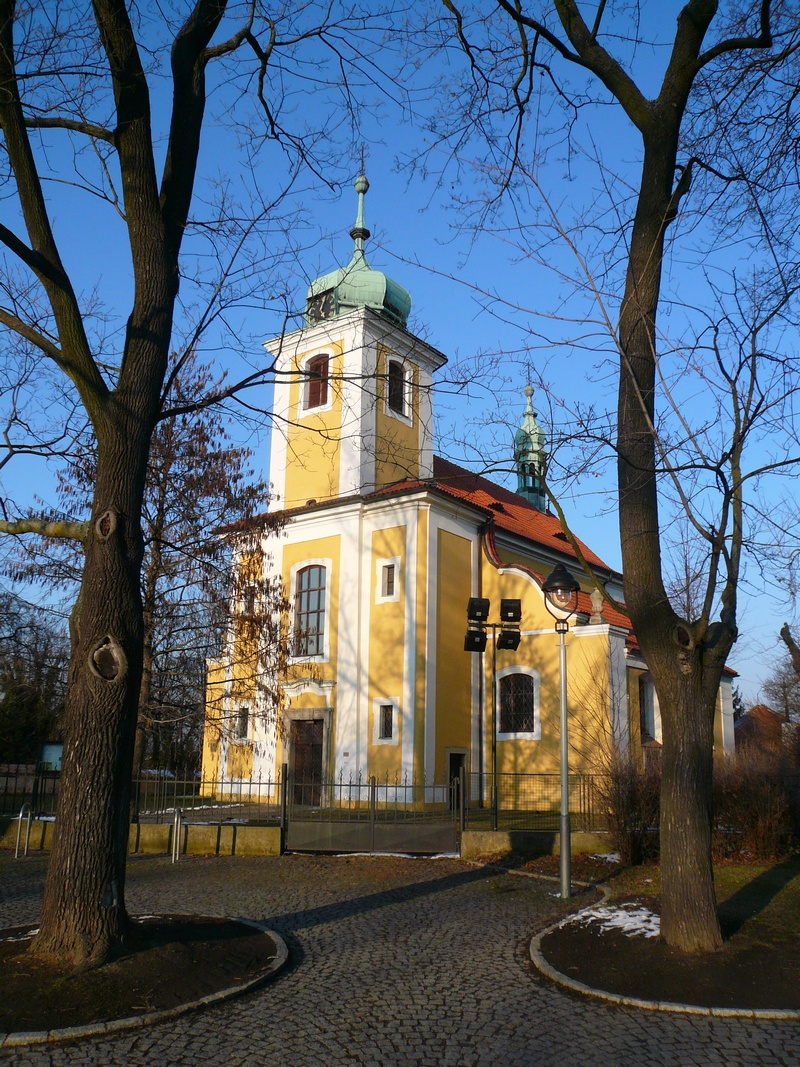
- Church of the Exaltation of the Holy Cross

- Flag Coat of arms
- Interactive map of Vinoř
- Coordinates: 50°8′47″N 14°34′43″E
- Country: Czech Republic
- Region: Prague
- District: Prague 19

Area
  - Total: 6 km^{2} (2.3 sq mi)

Population (2021)
  - Total: 4,528
  - Density: 750/km^{2} (2,000/sq mi)
- Time zone: UTC+1 (CET)
  - Summer (DST): UTC+2 (CEST)

Vinoř, officially Prague-Vinoř, is a municipal district (městská část) in Prague, Czech Republic.

== Demographics ==
As of the 2021 census, the population is 4,528, up 16% from 3,894 in 2011.

Historical population
Year	Pop.	±%
1869	906	—
1880	1,065	+17.5%
1890	1,167	+9.6%
1900	1,163	−0.3%
1910	1,090	−6.3%
1921	1,213	+11.3%
1930	1,496	+23.3%
1950	1,666	+11.4%
1961	1,907	+14.5%
1970	1,894	−0.7%
1980	1,959	+3.4%
1991	1,851	−5.5%
2001	2,542	+37.3%
2011	3,894	+53.2%
2021	4,528	+16.3%
Source: Censuses

== See also ==
- Vinoř Cricket Ground
