= Czech Cricket =

Governing body of cricket in the Czech Republic

Czech Cricket Union
- Českomoravský kriketový svaz
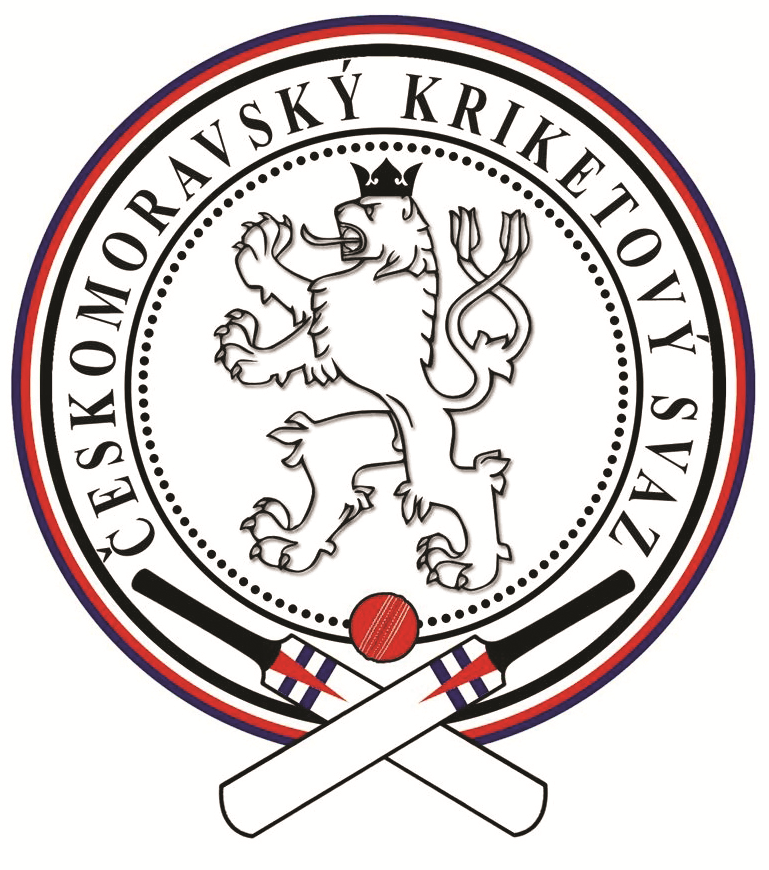
- Sport: Cricket
- Jurisdiction: National
- Abbreviation: ČMKS
- Founded: 2000; 26 years ago
- Affiliation: International Cricket Council
- Affiliation date: 2000; 26 years ago
- Regional affiliation: ICC Europe
- Headquarters: Rybná 716/24, 11000 Staré Město
- Location: Prague, Czech Republic
- President: Prakash Sadasivan
- Chairperson: Michael Londesborough
- CEO: Klara Kišová
- Secretary: Pratibha Choudhary

Official website
- www.czechcricket.cz
- (Czech Republic)

Czech Cricket Union (Czech: Českomoravský kriketový svaz; ČMKS) is the official governing body of the sport of cricket in the Czech Republic. Its current headquarters is in the national capital Prague. Czech Cricket Union is the Czech Republic's representative at the International Cricket Council and is an associate member and has been a member of that body since 2000. It is also a member of the ICC Europe (earlier the European Cricket Council).

== History ==
The first cricket match in the Czech Republic was played in 1997, and the ČMKS was set up in 2000 to drive forward the development of the game. The ČMKS runs Domestic leagues and operates a cricket-dedicated facility at the Vinoř Cricket Ground, with two fields, which has been in operation since 2012.

Their development partner, KAČR, delivers introduction to cricket programmes in Czech schools, runs soft ball and hard ball clubs and tournaments at U10, U12, U14 and U16 level for boys and girls.

On June 8 to June 13, 2025, Prague's Vinoř Cricket Ground hosted the Central Europe Cup, an international Twenty cricket tournament organized by the Czech Cricket Union. This year's event features national teams from Austria, Norway, Gibraltar, and the Czech Republic competing in a round-robin format. The tournament aims to elevate the profile of cricket in Central Europe, attracting growing interest across the region.

== Administration ==
The ČMKS is a member-based organisation; clubs that join the association become members with full voting rights. The operations of the ČMKS are carried out by the chief executive officer who is responsible for implementing the mission of the ČMKS and its strategic plan. The mission of the ČMKS is set out in its constitution while the strategic plan is decided by the executive committee, which is elected by the member clubs. The current committee is:

- President – Prakash Sadasivan
- Chairman – Michael Londesborough
- Secretary – Pratibha Choudhary
- Treasurer – Mansi Parmar
- Marketing Officer – Venkatesh Marghashayam
- Development Officer – Pratap Jagtap
- National Team Manager – Kranthi Venkataswamy
- Women's Officer – Desika Moodley
- Chief Executive Officer – Klara Kišová

== Leagues and Cups ==
Pro40 league – 12 Teams in 2 Divisions

T20 league – 18 teams in 3 Divisions

T10 league – 10 Teams in 1 Division

Indoor League – 18 teams in 3 Divisions

Scott Page Cup – Annual charity game

== Clubs and Associated Members ==
- Bohemian Cricket Club
- Brno Cricket Club
- Budějovice Barracudas CC
- Kriketová Akademie ČR z.s. (KAČR)
- Moravian Cricket Club
- Olomouc Cricket Club
- Prague Barbarians Cricket Club
- Prague Tigers Cricket Club
- Prague Spartans Cricket Club
- Prague Cricket Club
- Praha Dominators Club
- United Cricket Club
- Vinohrady Cricket Club

== Men's national Cricket Team ==
Czech Republic national cricket team

== See also ==
- Czech Republic national cricket team
- Czech Republic women's national cricket team
- Czech Republic national under-19 cricket team
- Czech Republic women's national under-19 cricket team
