= Czech Republic national cricket team =

Czech Republic
- Nickname: Lions
- Association: Czech Cricket Union

Personnel
- Captain: Sahil Grover
- Coach: Kushal Mendon
- Manager: Kranthi Venkataswamy

International Cricket Council
- ICC status: Associate member (2017)
- ICC region: Europe
ICC Rankings	Current	Best-ever
T20I	64th	52nd (2 May 2023)

International cricket
- First international: v. Austria at Vienna, Austria, 29 July 2006

T20 Internationals
- First T20I: v. Austria at Moara Vlasiei Cricket Ground, Moara Vlăsiei, 30 August 2019
- Last T20I: v. Bulgaria at Tikkurila Cricket Ground, Vantaa; 21 August 2026
T20Is	Played	Won/Lost
Total	58	29/28 (1 tie, 0 no results)
This year	9	5/4 (0 ties, 0 no results)
T20I kit
- As of 21 August 2026

The Czech national cricket team, nicknamed the Lions, represents the Czech Republic in international cricket. The team is organised by the Czech Cricket Union which became an affiliate member of the International Cricket Council (ICC) in 2000 and an associate member in 2017. The national side did not debut until 2006, when it played a series against Austria. It made its international tournament debut in 2008, at a Twenty20 tournament in Wales, and has since participated regularly in international events, including some organised by the European Cricket Council.

== History ==
=== 2008–2017 ===
In June 2008, an unofficial national team from the Czech Republic came second in an ICC supported Euro Twenty 20 tournament which took place at the Carmel & District Cricket Club in Wales. They were beaten by Estonia with 3 balls remaining in the final over after beating Russia and a Cricket Board of Wales team in the group stage, and a team representing Poland in the semi-final.

In August 2008, the Czech Republic hosted the Prague International Twenty 20 cricket cup at their former Vypich ground. Teams from Russia, Hungary, Romania and Bulgaria joined a team representing the Czech Republic in this 2-day Twenty 20 event. The team from Belarus was unable to attend due to visa complications and their place was filled by a Czech B team.

=== 2009: First official tournament ===
In September 2009, the Czech Republic participated for the first time in the ICC European Division 5 Championship in Corfu, finishing a respectable third (defeating Bulgaria, Turkey and Estonia) behind Sweden and the tournament winners, Greece.

In May 2011, the team took part in the ICC Europe Division 3 Championship in the newly structured format. They lost narrowly to Bulgaria but three wickets apiece from Brigham Smith and Scott Page restricted Estonia to 100 all out, which the Czech team chased down thanks to an unbeaten 33 from wicket-keeper Mik Starý. Turkey and tournament winners Sweden beat the Czech team in the next two matches, but a 23-run victory over tournament hosts Slovenia in the last match helped the Czech team to finish fourth overall.

The highlight of 2012 was a trip to Budapest, Hungary, to face their central European rivals on Hungary's impressive cricket ground. The Czech team were comprehensively beaten in the Saturday 40-over friendly, but they came back well to win the 20-over friendly on Sunday by four runs, with young bowler Damian Kyselý taking three wickets in an impressive display. Captain Scott Page stepped up and bowled an ideal final over to seal the win. In 2013, a plan to host Hungary at the Vinoř Cricket Ground in Vinoř, Prague, was abandoned due to bad weather. The team played one T20 in Vienna, losing by 87 runs to Austria.

2014 saw an increase in fixtures, with trips to Vienna and Dresden as well as hosting the Central Europe Cup, with T20 matches against Poland, Switzerland and Luxembourg. The match in Austria finished in another crushing defeat, this time to Austria's U25s. The trip to Dresden saw the team pick up a two-wicket win in a 50-over friendly against Dresden's 1st XI. Young bowler Oliver Matoušek picked up five wickets in his representative debut for the Lions, and Suditha Udugalage and Rahul Subash batted well to see the team home.

The Central Europe Cup ended with the team finishing bottom of the table, but the Czech team were the only team to beat champions Poland, and the Czech Republic also gave Switzerland a good run for their money before rain affected play, with Switzerland capitalising to take victory. A lacklustre Czech team then lost to a resurgent Luxembourg team on Sunday morning.

The Czech team were awarded the tournament's Spirit of Cricket award for wanting to play out the full match against Switzerland, despite being ahead on the Duckworth–Lewis method at the time. Opening batsmen Sudhir Gladson and Hilal Ahmad received man of the match awards for their performances against Poland and Switzerland, respectively.

2016- Played Central Europe Cup in Prague and traveled to Poland to play one-day tri-series with Poland, Hungary national teams. "Czech National Team Winner OD tri-series cup 2016".

2017- In 2017 a number of reforms regarding Associate Members and pathways to ICC tournaments were announced and due to the progress we have made in our domestic leagues the Czech Republic will return to ICC tournament cricket in August 2018 at the ICC. World T20 Europe Qualifiers in The Netherlands. Czech National Team played CE cup in Czech Republic, Euro T20 cup in Warsaw Poland.

=== 2018–Present ===
In April 2018, the ICC decided to grant full Twenty20 International (T20I) status to all its members. Therefore, all Twenty20 matches played between Czech Republic and other ICC members after 1 January 2019 will be a full T20I.

Czech Republic played their first T20I match against Austria on 30 August 2019 during the 2019 Continental Cup in Romania.

30 August 2019
09:00
Scorecard

Czech Republic; 125/7 (20 overs)	v	Austria; 126/2 (14.4 overs)
Sudesh Wickramasekara 52 (33); Abdullah Akbarjan 2/20 (4 overs)		Bilal Zalmai 45 (23); Arshad Hayat 2/15 (3 overs)

Austria won by 8 wickets
Moara Vlasiei Cricket Ground, Ilfov County
Umpires: Mark Jameson (Ger) and Thomas Kentorp (Den)

- Austria won the toss and elected to field.
- First ever T20I match for Czech Republic.

== Current squad ==
This lists all the players who were named in the most recent squad. Updated as of 28 August 2024.

Name	Age	Batting style	Bowling style	Notes
Batters
Dylan Steyn	31	Left-handed	Right-arm off break	Captain
Sahil Grover	37	Right-handed	Right-arm medium	
Martin Worndl	30	Left-handed	Right-arm medium	
Sabawoon Davizi	29	Left-handed	Right-arm medium	
All-rounders
Sazib Bhuiyan	33	Right-handed	Right-arm medium	
Ritik Tomar	34	Right-handed	Right-arm medium	
Muralidhara Vandrasi	35	Right-handed	Right-arm leg break	
Wicketkeepers
Divyendra Singh	40	Right-handed		
Spin Bowler
Naveed Ahmed	41	Right-handed	Right-arm off break	
Pace Bowlers
Abul Farhad	36	Right-handed	Right-arm medium	
Rahat Ali	40	Right-handed	Right-arm medium	
Shubhranshu Chaudhary	34	Right-handed	Right-arm medium	
Riaz Afridi	34	Right-handed	Right-arm medium	
Neeraj Tyagi	40	Right-handed	Right-arm medium	

== International grounds ==
Locations of all stadiums which have hosted an international cricket match within the Czech Republic

Ground	City	Region	Capacity	Matches hosted	Notes
Vinor Cricket Ground	Prague	Central Bohemian Region	1,000	T20Is, ICC Europe events	Czech Republic's main international venue; host of ECN & ICC events
Scott Page Field	Prague	Central Bohemian Region	500	T10s, development matches	Adjacent ground to Vinor; used for domestic and ECS tournaments

== Records ==
International Match Summary — Czech Republic

Last updated 21 August 2026.

Playing Record
Format	M	W	L	T	NR	Inaugural Match
Twenty20 Internationals	58	29	28	1	0	29 August 2019

=== Twenty20 International ===
- Highest team total: 278/4 v. Turkey on 30 August 2019 at Moara Vlasiei Cricket Ground, Moara Vlăsiei.
- Highest individual score: 123, Ratul Khan v. Serbia on 27 June 2026 at Vinoř Cricket Ground, Prague.
- Best individual bowling figures: 5/15, Sudesh Wickramasekara v. Bulgaria on 31 July 2022 at Tikkurila Cricket Ground, Vantaa.

Most T20I runs for Czech Republic

Player	Runs	Average	Career span
Sabawoon Davizi	1,373	35.20	2019–2026
Sudesh Wickramasekara	871	28.09	2019–2026
Arun Ashokan	655	27.29	2019–2023
Sazib Bhuiyan	579	18.67	2022–2026
Dylan Steyn	568	27.04	2022–2024

Most T20I wickets for Czech Republic

Player	Wickets	Average	Career span
Sazib Bhuiyan	42	19.78	2022–2026
Naveed Ahmed	34	22.35	2019–2025
Sudesh Wickramasekara	31	26.19	2019–2026
Sabawoon Davizi	23	12.26	2019–2026
Arun Ashokan	20	29.00	2019–2023

T20I record versus other nations

Records complete to T20I #4094. Last updated 21 August 2026.

Opponent	M	W	L	T	NR	First match	First win
vs Associate Members
Austria	8	1	7	0	0	30 August 2019	10 July 2022
Belgium	2	0	2	0	0	29 August 2020	
Bulgaria	4	4	0	0	0	4 September 2021	4 September 2021
Cyprus	1	1	0	0	0	25 August 2024	25 August 2024
Denmark	1	0	1	0	0	21 August 2024	
Estonia	2	1	1	0	0	28 July 2022	28 July 2022
France	1	0	1	0	0	24 July 2022	
Germany	1	0	1	0	0	14 August 2026	
Gibraltar	1	1	0	0	0	11 May 2022	11 May 2022
Greece	2	2	0	0	0	27 August 2024	27 August 2024
Hungary	6	4	1	1	0	2 September 2021	14 May 2022
Israel	1	0	1	0	0	18 August 2026	
Luxembourg	9	6	3	0	0	1 September 2019	1 September 2019
Malta	3	2	1	0	0	18 October 2019	18 October 2019
Norway	3	0	3	0	0	25 July 2022	
Portugal	1	0	1	0	0	20 August 2026	
Romania	7	3	4	0	0	31 August 2019	31 August 2019
Serbia	2	2	0	0	0	27 June 2026	27 June 2026
Spain	1	0	1	0	0	22 August 2024	
Switzerland	1	1	0	0	0	30 July 2022	30 July 2022
Turkey	1	1	0	0	0	30 August 2019	30 August 2019

== See also ==
- List of Czech Republic Twenty20 International cricketers
