= Royal Brussels Cricket Club =

Cricket ground

Coordinates: 50.69674°N 4.44975°E

- RBCC

Ground information
- Location: Lasne, Walloon Brabant, Wallonia, Belgium
- Country: Belgium
- Establishment: 1885
- Capacity: 1500
- End names
- Far End; Golf Course End

International information
- First T20I: 11 May 2019: Belgium v Germany
- Last T20I: 9 June 2024: Belgium v Guernsey
- First WT20I: 19 May 2024: Belgium v Luxembourg
- Last WT20I: 20 May 2024: Belgium v Luxembourg
- As of 9 June 2024; Source: Ground Profile

The Royal Brussels Cricket Club is a cricket club located in Lasne, Belgium, close to the city of Waterloo. In February 2019, it was announced that the club ground would host three Twenty20 International (T20I) matches in May 2019, between Belgium and Germany.
