= Vinoř Cricket Ground =

Cricket ground

Coordinates: 50°08′38″N 14°33′53″E

- Scott Page Field
- Interactive map of Vinoř Cricket Ground

Ground information
- Location: Vinoř, Prague, Czech Republic
- Establishment: 2012

International information
- First T20I: 21 May 2021: Czech Republic v Luxembourg
- Last T20I: 11 June 2023: Czech Republic v Hungary
- First WT20I: 14 June 2024: Czech Republic v Gibraltar
- Last WT20I: 16 June 2024: Czech Republic v Gibraltar
- As of 16 June 2024; Source: Cricinfo

Vinoř Cricket Ground
- Banks Field
- Interactive map of Vinoř Cricket Ground

Ground information
- Location: Vinoř, Prague, Czech Republic
- Establishment: 2014

International information
- As of 11 June 2023; Source: Cricinfo

The Vinoř Cricket Ground (Czech: Kriketové hřiště Vinoř) is a cricket ground in Vinoř, Prague, the first cricket ground in the Czech Republic. The ground opened in 2012, with a second pitch being added in 2014 due to funding from the International Cricket Council (ICC). In April 2021, the ground was confirmed as the venue for the 2021 Central Europe Cup, a Twenty20 International (T20I) cricket tournament.
