= List of Austria Twenty20 International cricketers =

This is a list of Austrian Twenty20 International cricketers.

In April 2018, the ICC decided to grant full Twenty20 International (T20I) status to all its members. Therefore, all Twenty20 matches played between Austria and other ICC members after 1 January 2019 have the T20I status.

This list comprises names of all members of the Austria cricket team who have played at least one T20I match. It is initially arranged in the order in which each player won his first Twenty20 cap. Where more than one player won his first Twenty20 cap in the same match, those players are listed alphabetically by surname (according to the name format used by Cricinfo).

Austria played their first match with T20I status on 29 August 2019 against Romania during the 2019 Romania T20 Cup.

== Key ==
General

- ‡ – Captain
- † – Wicket-keeper
- First – Year of debut
- Last – Year of latest game
- Mat – Number of matches played

Batting

- Runs – Runs scored in career
- HS – Highest score
- Avg – Runs scored per dismissal
- * – Batsman remained not out
- 50 – Half-centuries scored
- 100 – Centuries scored

Bowling

- Balls – Balls bowled in career
- Wkt – Wickets taken in career
- BBI – Best bowling in an innings
- Ave – Average runs per wicket

Fielding

- Ca – Catches taken
- St – Stumpings affected

== List of players ==
Statistics are correct as of 30 July 2026.

Austria T20I cricketers
General					Batting					Bowling				Fielding		Ref
No.	Name	First	Last	Mat	Runs	HS	Avg	50	100	Balls	Wkt	BBI	Ave	Ca	St	Ref
1	Abdullah Akbarjan	2019	2024	35	90	29	6.92	0	0	658	45	4/11	15.86	15	0	
2	Abrar Bilal†	2019	2024	19	238	37	21.63	0	0	–	–	–	–	18	9	
3	Aqib Iqbal‡	2019	2026	94	1,297	66*	24.01	5	0	1,957	103	5/5	21.66	36	0	
4	Bilal Zalmai	2019	2026	74	1,904	111*	29.75	13	1	1,619	85	4/12	21.94	29	0	
5	Habib Ahmadzai	2019	2022	10	125	39	15.62	0	0	24	4	4/12	6.25	3	0	
6	Kunal Joshi	2019	2021	8	62	32*	20.66	0	0	–	–	–	–	0	0	
7	Anthony Lark	2019	2019	5	110	43	27.50	0	0	66	4	3/20	13.75	3	0	
8	Mirza Ahsan	2019	2023	30	443	70*	21.09	4	0	–	–	–	–	3	0	
9	Amit Nathwani	2019	2023	29	27	7*	9.00	0	0	546	34	3/14	18.47	3	0	
10	Razmal Shigiwal‡	2019	2025	55	1,301	95*	31.73	8	0	48	2	2/28	27.00	15	0	
11	Mark Simpson-Parker†	2019	2025	41	640	65*	22.06	5	0	42	4	2/6	14.50	23	1	
12	Abdul Rahman	2019	2019	3	–	–	–	–	–	60	4	2/37	18.00	0	0	
13	Zeshan Arif	2019	2026	39	417	61	18.95	1	0	77	7	4/10	15.00	15	0	
14	Arsalan Arif†	2019	2025	16	97	27	19.40	0	0	–	–	–	–	9	1	
15	Jaweed Sadran	2021	2023	20	81	18*	9.00	0	0	303	13	3/17	31.92	3	0	
16	Lakmal Kasturiarachchige	2021	2021	5	5	5*	–	0	0	96	3	2/18	43.33	2	0	
17	Rayhaan Ahmed†	2021	2021	4	–	–	–	–	–	–	–	–	–	1	1	
18	Sahel Zadran	2021	2025	48	163	22*	9.58	0	0	890	40	5/13	26.90	16	0	
19	Navin Wijesekera	2021	2023	10	92	28	11.50	0	0	–	–	–	–	3	0	
20	Zabiullah Ibrahimkhel	2021	2021	1	–	–	–	–	–	–	–	–	–	0	0	
21	Imran Asif	2021	2026	29	456	102	1,855	0	1	110	8	2/13	19.62	10	0	
22	Umair Tariq	2021	2026	58	151	32	10.06	0	0	789	65	5/32	16.61	30	0	
23	Iqbal Hossain	2021	2023	25	532	71	25.33	3	0	78	6	3/22	15.16	7	0	
24	Shahil Momin	2021	2023	24	358	61	21.05	1	0	501	29	4/19	18.37	13	0	
25	Waqar Zalmai	2021	2026	50	231	23*	12.83	0	0	855	49	5/17	24.83	7	0	
26	Ahsan Yousuf	2022	2022	3	30	23	15.00	0	0	66	5	3/24	19.60	0	0	
27	Mehar Cheema†	2022	2026	30	167	33	11.13	0	0	–	–	–	–	14	3	
28	Itibarshah Deedar	2022	2025	12	9	5*	9.00	0	0	154	4	2/15	55.50	3	0	
29	Armaan Randhawa	2022	2026	44	613	78*	20.43	3	0	–	–	–	–	17	0	
30	Osman Khan	2022	2022	1	–	–	–	–	–	6	0	–	–	1	0	
31	Daniel Eckstein	2023	2023	1	–	–	–	–	–	–	–	–	–	1	0	
32	Amar Naeem†	2024	2026	34	395	66	17.95	1	0	–	–	–	–	20	1	
33	Baseer Khan	2024	2026	51	275	45*	14.47	0	0	456	28	4/10	18.82	17	0	
34	Karanbir Singh	2024	2026	65	2,616	164	45.89	20	4	481	40	4/42	16.37	33	0	
35	Shadnan Khan	2024	2026	17	217	80	18.08	1	0	129	9	4/34	15.66	5	2	
36	Adeel Tariq	2024	2024	2	–	–	–	–	–	12	1	1/13	13.00	2	0	
37	Janan Ghelzai	2025	2025	8	27	17	6.75	0	0	6	0	–	–	4	0	
38	Hamid Safi	2025	2026	29	275	58*	25.00	1	0	58	6	3/15	15.00	10	0	
39	Hekmatullah Khogiyani	2025	2026	18	126	41	15.75	0	0	289	9	2/17	42.22	7	0	
40	Qadargul Utmanzai	2025	2025	1	6	6	6.00	0	0	–	–	–	–	0	0	
41	Kumud Jha	2025	2026	21	101	30	7.76	0	0	168	10	2/7	22.60	6	0	
42	Mansoor Safi†	2025	2026	16	195	80	17.72	1	0	–	–	–	–	10	0	
43	Zeeshan Goraya	2025	2026	12	47	18	7.83	0	0	178	11	2/5	21.90	4	0	
44	Ziaurahman Shinwari	2025	2025	9	0	0	0.00	0	0	131	9	4/22	18.33	5	0	
45	Saad Cheema	2025	2026	20	25	21*	6.25	0	0	234	24	5/27	12.37	5	0	
46	Ebrahim Naseri	2025	2025	2	–	–	–	–	–	18	0	–	–	1	0	
47	Ranjit Singh	2025	2025	8	82	51	16.40	1	0	–	–	–	–	8	0	
48	Irfan Safi	2025	2026	25	182	20*	15.16	0	0	230	16	5/28	25.06	10	0	
49	Nageebullah Sultanzai	2026	2026	8	27	13*	6.75	0	0	–	–	–	–	1	0	
50	Faridullah Shams	2026	2026	6	11	6	5.50	0	0	78	6	3/16	17.66	2	0	
51	Abidullah Kotwa	2026	2026	3	93	93*	–	1	0	30	3	2/11	16.33	3	0	
52	Maiwand Momand	2026	2026	5	6	3*	3.00	0	0	72	4	3/33	22.50	0	0	
53	Akshay Wagh	2026	2026	5	25	16	8.33	0	0	8	7	5/17	14.71	0	0	

Note: The following match includes one or more missing catchers in the ESPNcricinfo scorecard and hence statistics (as of 1 September 2019):

- vs. Czech Republic (1 September 2019); 1 missing catcher
