= Austria national cricket team =

Austria
- Austrian Cricket Association logo
- Association: Austrian Cricket Association

Personnel
- Captain: Aqib Iqbal (2024)
- Coach: Daniel Eckstein

International Cricket Council
- ICC status: Associate member (2017)
- ICC region: Europe
ICC Rankings	Current	Best-ever
T20I	43rd	36th (2-May-2019)

International cricket
- First international: v Guernsey at Castel, Guernsey, 21 May 1990

T20 Internationals
- First T20I: v Romania at Moara Vlasiei Cricket Ground, Moara Vlăsiei; 29 August 2019
- Last T20I: v Romania at Moara Vlasei Cricket Ground, Ilfov County; 30 July 2026
T20Is	Played	Won/Lost
Total	108	67/38 (0 ties, 3 no results)
This year	24	12/12 (0 ties, 0 no results)
- T20 World Cup Qualifier appearances: 1 (Note: From 2023 edition onwards, T20 World Cup Qualifier refers to the Regional Final of the ICC Europe region.) (first in 2023)
- Best result: 7th place (2023)
T20I kit
- As of 30 July 2026

The Austria national cricket team (German: Österreichische Cricketnationalmannschaft) is the men's team that represents the Republic of Austria in international cricket. The team is organised by the Austrian Cricket Association (ACA), which became an affiliate member of the International Cricket Council (ICC) in 1992 and an associate member in 2017.

The Austria national team made its international debut in 1990, at the European Cricketer Cup in Guernsey. It has since regularly competed in European Cricket Council tournaments, usually in the lower divisions, and also often plays bilateral series against other European sides.

== History ==
Cricket was played by English gardeners, tradesmen and bank staff working in Vienna at the end of the 19th century. In 1894, the Vienna Cricket and Football-Club was founded. However cricket then disappeared in Austria until after the Second World War, when it was played recreationally by British occupying troops.

The modern era of Austrian cricket began in May 1975, when the Australian Kerry Tattersall introduced the game to his pupils at the Wiener Handelsakademie (Viennese Commercial Academy) where he was teaching English, and formed the Vienna Cricket Club. Early opponents came from the United Nations (United Nations CC) and diplomatic services (Five Continents CC), and these founder clubs survive to this day.

Cricket in Austria predominantly remains Vienna-based: 11 of the 18 member clubs are based in Vienna. CC Velden '91 is the oldest non-Viennese club, operating since 1991. The latest addition to the ACA is ASKÖ Steyr CC from Upper Austria.

=== 2018–present ===
In April 2018, the ICC decided to grant full Twenty20 International (T20I) status to all its members. Therefore, all Twenty20 matches played between Austria and other ICC members since 1 January 2019 have the full T20I status.

Austria played its first T20I match against Romania on 29 August 2019 during the 2019 Continental Cup in Romania.

29 August 2019
09:00
Scorecard

Romania; 137/7 (20 overs)	v	Austria; 106 (19.4 overs)
Ijaz Hussain 35 (36); Bilal Zalmai 4/12 (4 overs)		Anthony Lark 30 (41); Ramesh Satheesan 3/14 (4 overs)

Romania won by 31 runs
Moara Vlasiei Cricket Ground, Ilfov County
Umpires: Mark Jameson (Ger) and Thomas Kentorp (Den)

- Austria won the toss and elected to field.
- First ever T20I match for Austria.

== Tournament history ==
=== T20 World Cup Europe Regional Final ===
ICC T20 World Cup Europe Regional Final records
Year	Round	Position	GP	W	L	T	NR
(Guernsey) 2019	Did not qualify						
(Jersey) 2021	Did not qualify						
(Scotland) 2023	Round-robin	7/7	6	0	5	0	1
(Netherlands) 2025	Did not qualify						
Total	1/4	0 Title	6	0	5	0	1

=== Other tournaments ===
T20 World Cup Europe Sub-regional Qualifiers	European Cricket Championship	European T20 Championship
2019 (Group A): 3rd place; 2023: Winners (Advanced to regional final); 2024: 3rd place	2002 (Division Two): 6th place; 2009 (Division Four): 3rd place; 2017 (Division One): 4th place	2011: Div 2: Runners-up; Div 1: 8th place; 2013 (Division One): 6th place; 2014 (Division Two): 3rd place

The Austria national team has participated in a considerable number of international tournaments, including hosting three tournaments since 2000:

Year	Event and location	Participating nations	No.
2000	ECC (European Cricket Council) Representative Festival	Norway, Slovenia, Croatia, Finland, Austria	5
2001	ECC Trophy in Seebarn and Velden	Sweden, Malta, Portugal, Spain, Switzerland, Greece, Belgium, Austria, Croatia, Finland	10
2002	ECC European Cricket Championships, B Division in Northern Ireland	Austria, France, Germany, Gibraltar, Israel, Portugal	6
2003	ECC Notts Sport Trophy in Seebarn and Markomannenstrasse	Malta, Portugal, Spain, Luxembourg, Switzerland, Greece, Belgium, Croatia, Finland, Austria, Norway	11

Austria have been placed in Division Five of the newly expanded European Championship from 2008.

== Grounds ==
Location of international cricket matches played in Austria

== Current squad ==
Updated as of 23 August 2025.

This lists all the players who were part of the Austrian squad for the 2025 home series against Belgium.

Name	Age	Batting style	Bowling style	Last T20I	Notes
Batters
Armaan Randhawa	31	Right-handed	—N/a	(Norway) 2025	
Zeshan Arif	28	Right-handed	Leg break	(Belgium) 2025	
All-rounder
Aqib Iqbal	29	Right-handed	Right-arm medium	(Belgium) 2025	Captain
Bilal Zalmai	37	Right-handed	Right-arm off break	(Belgium) 2025	
Ranjit Singh	36	Right-handed	Right-arm medium	(Belgium) 2025	
Karanbir Singh	31	Right-handed	Right-arm medium	(Belgium) 2025	
Zeeshan Goraya	42	Right-handed	Right-arm medium	(Belgium) 2025	
Wicket-keeper
Amar Naeem	47	Right-handed	—N/a	(Belgium) 2025	
Mehar Cheema	32	Right-handed	—N/a	(Belgium) 2025	
Pace Bowlers
Hamid Safi	25	Right-handed	Right-arm medium	(Belgium) 2025	
Saad Cheema	22	Right-handed	Right-arm medium	(Belgium) 2025	
Baseer Khan	30	Right-handed	Right-arm medium	(Belgium) 2025	
Sahel Zadran	36	Right-handed	Right-arm medium	(Belgium) 2025	
Umair Tariq	28	Right-handed	Right-arm medium	(Belgium) 2025	
Waqar Zalmai	35	Right-handed	Right-arm medium	(Belgium) 2025	
Ziaurahman Shinwari	24	Right-handed	Right-arm medium	(Belgium) 2025	

== Club cricket ==
There are three club competitions within Austria: the ACA (Austrian Cricket Association) League, and ACA Trophy (north & south).

The ACA League comprises (in 2006) 14 teams, 10 of which are based in Vienna. The ACA Trophy sometimes includes teams from outside Austria, for example from Poland and the Czech Republic.

== Records ==
International Match Summary — Austria

Last updated 30 July 2026.

Playing Record
Format	M	W	L	T	NR	Inaugural Match
Twenty20 Internationals	108	67	38	0	3	29 August 2019

=== Twenty20 International ===
- Highest team total: 322/7 v Hungary, 28 June 2026 at GB Oval, Sződliget
- Highest individual score: 164, Karanbir Singh v Hungary, 28 June 2026 at GB Oval, Sződliget
- Best individual bowling figures: 5/5, Aqib Iqbal v Belgium, 24 July 2021 at Royal Brussels Cricket Club, Waterloo

Most T20I runs for Austria

Player	Runs	Average	Career span
Karanbir Singh	2,616	45.89	2024–2026
Bilal Zalmai	1,904	29.75	2019–2026
Razmal Shigiwal	1,301	31.73	2019–2025
Aqib Iqbal	1,297	24.01	2019–2026
Mark Simpson-Parker	640	22.06	2019–2025

Most T20I wickets for Austria

Player	Wickets	Average	Career span
Aqib Iqbal	103	21.66	2019–2026
Bilal Zalmai	85	21.94	2019–2026
Umair Tariq	65	16.61	2021–2026
Waqar Zalmai	49	24.83	2021–2026
Abdullah Akbarjan	45	15.86	2019–2024

T20I record versus other nations

Records complete to T20I #4053. Last updated 30 July 2026.

Opponent	M	W	L	T	NR	First match	First win
v. Full members
Ireland	1	0	1	0	0	23 July 2023	
vs Associate Members
Belgium	12	8	4	0	0	24 July 2021	25 July 2021
Bulgaria	1	1	0	0	0	30 July 2022	30 July 2022
Croatia	1	1	0	0	0	23 May 2026	
Cyprus	2	1	1	0	0	14 March 2026	16 March 2026
Czech Republic	8	7	1	0	0	30 August 2019	30 August 2019
Denmark	1	0	1	0	0	24 July 2023	
Finland	1	0	1	0	0	11 June 2026	
France	3	2	1	0	0	16 June 2024	16 June 2024
Germany	11	2	9	0	0	9 June 2022	10 June 2022
Guernsey	2	1	1	0	0	27 July 2022	27 July 2022
Hungary	11	8	2	0	1	4 June 2022	4 June 2022
Isle of Man	3	0	2	0	1	9 July 2023	
Israel	2	2	0	0	0	10 June 2024	10 June 2024
Jersey	1	0	1	0	0	20 July 2023	
Luxembourg	7	6	1	0	0	31 August 2019	31 August 2019
Malta	4	3	1	0	0	3 February 2025	3 February 2025
Norway	7	5	2	0	0	31 July 2022	31 July 2022
Portugal	1	1	0	0	0	12 June 2024	12 June 2024
Romania	11	5	5	0	1	29 August 2019	25 July 2025
Scotland	1	0	1	0	0	25 July 2023	
Slovenia	6	6	0	0	0	25 July 2022	25 July 2022
Switzerland	4	3	1	0	0	30 May 2025	30 May 2025
Sweden	5	3	2	0	0	10 June 2022	10 June 2022
Turkey	2	2	0	0	0	31 August 2019	31 August 2019

== See also ==
- List of Austria Twenty20 International cricketers
- Austria women's national cricket team
- List of International Cricket Council members
