= Associate international cricket in 2023 =

International cricket season

The 2023 Associate international cricket season included series starting from April to September 2023. All official twenty-over matches between Associate members of the ICC were eligible to have full men's Twenty International or women's Twenty20 International (T20I) status, as the International Cricket Council (ICC) granted T20I status to matches between all of its members from 1 July 2018 (women's teams) and 1 January 2019 (men's teams). The season included all T20I cricket series mostly involving ICC Associate members, that were played in addition to series covered in International cricket in 2023.

== Season overview ==
Men's international tours
Start date	Home team	Away team	Results [Matches]	
Start date	Home team	Away team	T20I	
9 June 2023	Germany	Belgium	4–0 [4]	
10 June 2023	Czech Republic	Hungary	3–0 [3]	
24 June 2023	Luxembourg	Switzerland	1–1 [2]	
29 June 2023	(Netherlands) Austria	Germany	0–2 [2]	
7 July 2023	Jersey	Guernsey	2–0 [3]	
9 July 2023	Isle of Man	Austria	2–0 [3]	
5 August 2023	Hungary	Croatia	2–0 [3]	
14 August 2023	(Netherlands) Germany	Guernsey	1–2 [3]	
Men's international tournaments
Start date	Tournament			Winners
1 May 2023	(Cambodia) 2023 Southeast Asian Games			Cambodia
4 May 2023	2023 Gibraltar Tri-Nation Series			Portugal
18 May 2023	(Denmark) 2023 Nordic Cup			Denmark
27 May 2023	(South Africa) 2023 Southern Africa Cup			Botswana
9 June 2023	(Kenya) 2023 Continent Cup T20 Africa			Uganda
23 June 2023	2023 Bulgaria Quadrangular Series			Serbia
10 July 2023	(Malta) 2023 Mdina Cup			France
12 July 2023	(Malta) 2023 Valletta Cup			Switzerland
20 July 2023	(Scotland) 2022–23 ICC Men's T20 World Cup Europe Qualifier			Scotland
22 July 2023	(Papua New Guinea) 2022–23 ICC Men's T20 World Cup East Asia-Pacific Qualifier			Papua New Guinea
26 July 2023	(Malaysia) 2023 ICC Men's T20 World Cup Asia Qualifier B			Malaysia
18 August 2023	(Romania) 2023 Men's Continental Cup			Romania
20 August 2023	(Rwanda) 2023 East Africa T20 Cup			Uganda
15 September 2023	(Qatar) 2023 Men's Gulf T20I Championship			Oman
19 September 2023	2023 Malaysia Tri-Nation Series			Papua New Guinea

Women's international tours
Start date	Home team	Away team	Results [Matches]
Start date	Home team	Away team	WT20I
5 May 2023	Austria	France	0–5 [5]
29 May 2023	Malaysia	Nepal	2–3 [5]
17 June 2023	Brazil	Argentina	5–0 [5]
24 June 2023	Guernsey	Jersey	0–3 [3]
30 July 2023	Austria	Isle of Man	0–3 [3]
24 August 2023	Netherlands	Jersey	2–0 [3]
24 August 2023	Singapore	Myanmar	0–3 [3]
27 August 2023	Austria	Guernsey	1–3 [4]
28 August 2023	Vanuatu	Japan	2–0 [2]
Women's international tournaments
Start date	Tournament		Winners
30 April 2023	(Cambodia) 2023 Southeast Asian Games		Thailand
25 May 2023	(China) 2023 Women's Twenty20 East Asia Cup		Hong Kong
29 May 2023	(Jersey) 2023 ICC Women's T20 World Cup Europe Division Two		France
10 June 2023	(Rwanda) 2023 Kwibuka Women's T20 Tournament		Rwanda
12 June 2023	(Hong Kong) 2023 ACC Women's T20 Emerging Teams Asia Cup		India A
10 July 2023	2023 Netherlands Women's Tri-Nation Series		Thailand
4 August 2023	(Romania) 2023 Women's Continental Cup		Isle of Man
22 August 2023	2023 Malaysia Women's Quadrangular Series		Nepal
25 August 2023	(Finland) 2023 Women's T20I Nordic Cup		Sweden
31 August 2023	(Malaysia) 2023 ICC Women's T20 World Cup Asia Qualifier		United Arab Emirates
1 September 2023	(Vanuatu) 2023 ICC Women's T20 World Cup EAP Qualifier		Vanuatu
2 September 2023	(Botswana) 2023 ICC Women's T20 World Cup Africa Division Two		Kenya
4 September 2023	(United States) 2023 ICC Women's T20 World Cup Americas Qualifier		United States
5 September 2023	2023 Greece Women's Quadrangular Series		Greece
6 September 2023	(Spain) 2023 ICC Women's T20 World Cup Europe Division One		Scotland

== May ==
=== 2023 Southeast Asian Games ===
==== Men's T20 Tournament ====
Pos	Team	Pld	W	L	NR	Pts	NRR
1	Malaysia	2	2	0	0	4	4.135
2	Indonesia	2	1	1	0	2	−1.550
3	Thailand	2	0	2	0	0	−2.187

Source: ESPNcricinfo

Pos	Team	Pld	W	L	NR	Pts	NRR
1	Cambodia	2	2	0	0	4	0.575
2	Singapore	2	1	1	0	2	1.800
3	Philippines	2	0	2	0	0	−2.375

Source: ESPNcricinfo

Group stage
No.	Date	Team 1	Captain 1	Team 2	Captain 2	Venue	Result
T20I 2050	1 May	Indonesia	Kadek Gamantika	Thailand	Nopphon Senamontree	AZ Group Cricket Oval, Phnom Penh	Indonesia by 32 runs
T20I 2051	2 May	Indonesia	Kadek Gamantika	Malaysia	Ahmad Faiz	AZ Group Cricket Oval, Phnom Penh	Malaysia by 94 runs
T20I 2052	3 May	Philippines	Daniel Smith	Singapore	Rezza Gaznavi	AZ Group Cricket Oval, Phnom Penh	Singapore by 87 runs
T20I 2053	4 May	Malaysia	Ahmad Faiz	Thailand	Nopphon Senamontree	AZ Group Cricket Oval, Phnom Penh	Malaysia by 8 wickets
T20I 2054	4 May	Cambodia	Luqman Butt	Singapore	Rezza Gaznavi	AZ Group Cricket Oval, Phnom Penh	Cambodia by 15 runs
T20I 2064	10 May	Cambodia	Luqman Butt	Philippines	Daniel Smith	AZ Group Cricket Oval, Phnom Penh	Cambodia by 8 runs
Medal matches
No.	Date	Team 1	Captain 1	Team 2	Captain 2	Venue	Result
T20I 2065	11 May	Indonesia	Kadek Gamantika	Singapore	Rezza Gaznavi	AZ Group Cricket Oval, Phnom Penh	Singapore by 15 runs
T20I 2066	11 May	Cambodia	Luqman Butt	Malaysia	Ahmad Faiz	AZ Group Cricket Oval, Phnom Penh	Cambodia by 12 runs

==== Women's T20 Tournament ====
Pos	Team	Pld	W	L	NR	Pts	NRR
1	Thailand	3	3	0	0	6	2.460
2	Malaysia	3	2	1	0	4	2.367
3	Myanmar	3	1	2	0	2	−1.934
4	Philippines	3	0	3	0	0	−6.310

Source: ESPNcricinfo

Pos	Team	Pld	W	L	NR	Pts	NRR
1	Indonesia	2	2	0	0	4	3.967
2	Singapore	2	1	1	0	2	0.300
3	Cambodia	2	0	2	0	0	−4.471

Source: ESPNcricinfo

Group stage
No.	Date	Team 1	Captain 1	Team 2	Captain 2	Venue	Result
WT20I 1421	30 April	Cambodia	Pen Samon	Singapore	Shafina Mahesh	AZ Group Cricket Oval, Phnom Penh	Singapore by 64 runs
WT20I 1424	1 May	Philippines	Josie Arimas	Thailand	Nannapat Koncharoenkai	AZ Group Cricket Oval, Phnom Penh	Thailand by 10 wickets
WT20I 1425	1 May	Indonesia	Ni Wayan Sariani	Singapore	Shafina Mahesh	AZ Group Cricket Oval, Phnom Penh	Indonesia by 52 runs
WT20I 1429	4 May	Malaysia	Winifred Duraisingam	Thailand	Naruemol Chaiwai	AZ Group Cricket Oval, Phnom Penh	Thailand by 12 runs
WT20I 1432	6 May	Malaysia	Winifred Duraisingam	Philippines	Josie Arimas	AZ Group Cricket Oval, Phnom Penh	Malaysia by 10 wickets
WT20I 1436	8 May	Cambodia	Pen Samon	Indonesia	Ni Wayan Sariani	AZ Group Cricket Oval, Phnom Penh	Indonesia by 9 wickets
WT20I 1438	9 May	Myanmar	Zar Win	Thailand	Naruemol Chaiwai	AZ Group Cricket Oval, Phnom Penh	Thailand by 10 wickets
WT20I 1440	11 May	Myanmar	Zar Win	Philippines	Josie Arimas	AZ Group Cricket Oval, Phnom Penh	Myanmar by 6 wickets
WT20I 1442	14 May	Malaysia	Winifred Duraisingam	Myanmar	Zar Win	AZ Group Cricket Oval, Phnom Penh	Malaysia by 82 runs
Medal matches
No.	Date	Team 1	Captain 1	Team 2	Captain 2	Venue	Result
WT20I 1443	15 May	Malaysia	Winifred Duraisingam	Singapore	Shafina Mahesh	AZ Group Cricket Oval, Phnom Penh	Malaysia by 8 wickets
WT20I 1444	15 May	Indonesia	Ni Wayan Sariani	Thailand	Naruemol Chaiwai	AZ Group Cricket Oval, Phnom Penh	Thailand by 40 runs

=== 2023 Gibraltar Tri-Nation Series ===
Pos	Team	Pld	W	L	NR	Pts	NRR
1	Portugal	6	6	0	0	12	2.400
2	Gibraltar	6	2	4	0	4	0.024
3	Malta	6	1	5	0	2	−2.215

Source: ESPNcricinfo

T20I series
No.	Date	Team 1	Captain 1	Team 2	Captain 2	Venue	Result
T20I 2055	4 May	Malta	Varun Thamotharam	Portugal	Najjam Shahzad	Europa Sports Park, Gibraltar	Portugal by 84 runs
T20I 2056	4 May	Gibraltar	Avinash Pai	Portugal	Najjam Shahzad	Europa Sports Park, Gibraltar	Portugal by 7 wickets
T20I 2057	5 May	Malta	Varun Thamotharam	Portugal	Najjam Shahzad	Europa Sports Park, Gibraltar	Portugal by 17 runs
T20I 2058	5 May	Gibraltar	Avinash Pai	Malta	Varun Thamotharam	Europa Sports Park, Gibraltar	Gibraltar by 43 runs
T20I 2059	6 May	Gibraltar	Avinash Pai	Malta	Varun Thamotharam	Europa Sports Park, Gibraltar	Gibraltar by 80 runs
T20I 2060	6 May	Gibraltar	Avinash Pai	Portugal	Najjam Shahzad	Europa Sports Park, Gibraltar	Portugal by 9 wickets
T20I 2061	6 May	Malta	Varun Thamotharam	Portugal	Najjam Shahzad	Europa Sports Park, Gibraltar	Portugal by 7 wickets
T20I 2062	7 May	Gibraltar	Iain Latin	Portugal	Najjam Shahzad	Europa Sports Park, Gibraltar	Portugal by 1 wicket
T20I 2063	7 May	Gibraltar	Iain Latin	Malta	Varun Thamotharam	Europa Sports Park, Gibraltar	Malta by 1 run

=== France women in Austria ===
WT20I series
No.	Date	Home captain	Away captain	Venue	Result
WT20I 1430	5 May	Jo-Antoinette Stiglitz	Marie Violleau	Seebarn Cricket Ground, Lower Austria	France by 43 runs
WT20I 1431	5 May	Jo-Antoinette Stiglitz	Marie Violleau	Seebarn Cricket Ground, Lower Austria	France by 62 runs
WT20I 1433	6 May	Jo-Antoinette Stiglitz	Marie Violleau	Seebarn Cricket Ground, Lower Austria	France by 99 runs
WT20I 1434	6 May	Jo-Antoinette Stiglitz	Marie Violleau	Seebarn Cricket Ground, Lower Austria	France by 4 wickets (DLS)
WT20I 1435	7 May	Jo-Antoinette Stiglitz	Marie Violleau	Seebarn Cricket Ground, Lower Austria	France by 8 wickets

=== 2023 Nordic Cup ===
Pos	Team	Pld	W	L	NR	Pts	NRR
1	Denmark	4	3	1	0	6	1.981
2	Norway	5	3	2	0	6	0.457
3	Sweden	5	2	3	0	4	0.052
4	Finland	6	2	4	0	4	−1.572

Source: ESPNcricinfo

T20I series
No.	Date	Team 1	Captain 1	Team 2	Captain 2	Venue	Result
T20I 2067	18 May	Denmark	Hamid Shah	Norway	Ali Saleem	Svanholm Park, Brøndby	Denmark by 9 wickets
T20I 2068	18 May	Denmark	Hamid Shah	Finland	Nathan Collins	Svanholm Park, Brøndby	Denmark by 72 runs
T20I 2069	18 May	Norway	Ali Saleem	Sweden	Shahzeb Choudhry	Solvangs Park, Glostrup	Norway by 75 runs
T20I 2070	19 May	Denmark	Hamid Shah	Sweden	Shahzeb Choudhry	Svanholm Park, Brøndby	Sweden by 10 wickets
T20I 2071	19 May	Finland	Nathan Collins	Norway	Ali Saleem	Solvangs Park, Glostrup	Norway by 30 runs
T20I 2072	19 May	Denmark	Hamid Shah	Finland	Nathan Collins	Svanholm Park, Brøndby	Denmark by 8 wickets
T20I 2073	19 May	Norway	Ali Saleem	Sweden	Shahzeb Choudhry	Solvangs Park, Glostrup	Sweden by 53 runs
T20I 2074	20 May	Finland	Nathan Collins	Sweden	Shahzeb Choudhry	Svanholm Park, Brøndby	Finland by 7 runs
9th Match	20 May	Denmark A	Taranjit Bharaj	Sweden A	Sami Rahmani	Svanholm Park, Brøndby	Denmark A by 66 runs
T20I 2075	20 May	Finland	Amjad Sher	Norway	Ali Saleem	Solvangs Park, Glostrup	Norway by 7 wickets
11th Match	21 May	Denmark A	Taranjit Bharaj	Norway A	Muhammad Butt	Svanholm Park, Brøndby	Denmark A by 8 wickets
T20I 2076	21 May	Finland	Nathan Collins	Sweden	Shahzeb Choudhry	Solvangs Park, Glostrup	Match tied (Finland won S/O)

=== 2023 Women's Twenty20 East Asia Cup ===
Pos	Team	Pld	W	L	NR	Pts	NRR
1	Hong Kong	4	3	1	0	6	0.223
2	China	4	2	2	0	4	0.893
3	Japan	4	1	3	0	2	−1.141

Source: ESPNcricinfo

Round-robin
No.	Date	Team 1	Captain 1	Team 2	Captain 2	Venue	Result
WT20I 1445	25 May	China	Huang Zhuo	Hong Kong	Kary Chan	ZJUT Cricket Field, Hangzhou	Hong Kong by 2 wickets
WT20I 1446	25 May	Hong Kong	Kary Chan	Japan	Mai Yanagida	ZJUT Cricket Field, Hangzhou	Hong Kong by 6 wickets
WT20I 1447	26 May	China	Huang Zhuo	Japan	Mai Yanagida	ZJUT Cricket Field, Hangzhou	Japan by 11 runs
WT20I 1448	26 May	China	Huang Zhuo	Hong Kong	Kary Chan	ZJUT Cricket Field, Hangzhou	China by 55 runs
WT20I 1449	27 May	Hong Kong	Kary Chan	Japan	Mai Yanagida	ZJUT Cricket Field, Hangzhou	Hong Kong by 47 runs
WT20I 1450	27 May	China	Huang Zhuo	Japan	Mai Yanagida	ZJUT Cricket Field, Hangzhou	China by 35 runs
Final
No.	Date	Team 1	Captain 1	Team 2	Captain 2	Venue	Result
WT20I 1451	28 May	China	Huang Zhuo	Hong Kong	Kary Chan	ZJUT Cricket Field, Hangzhou	Match tied (Hong Kong won S/O)

=== 2023 Southern Africa Cup ===
Pos	Team	Pld	W	L	NR	Pts	NRR
1	Botswana	4	4	0	0	8	3.731
2	Malawi	4	3	1	0	6	0.650
3	Mozambique	4	1	3	0	2	−1.213
4	Mauritius	4	1	3	0	2	−1.382
5	Eswatini	4	1	3	0	2	−1.602

Source: ESPNcricinfo

T20I series
No.	Date	Team 1	Captain 1	Team 2	Captain 2	Venue	Result
1st Match	27 May	Mauritius	Mark Segers	Mozambique	Filipe Cossa	Willowmoore Park, Benoni	Mauritius by 3 wickets
T20I 2077	27 May	Eswatini	Adil Butt	Malawi	Moazzam Baig	Willowmoore Park, Benoni	Malawi by 53 runs
3rd match	28 May	Botswana	Karabo Motlhanka	Mauritius	Mark Segers	Willowmoore Park, Benoni	Botswana by 7 wickets
T20I 2078	28 May	Malawi	Moazzam Baig	Mozambique	Filipe Cossa	Willowmoore Park, Benoni	Malawi by 9 wickets
T20I 2079	29 May	Botswana	Karabo Motlhanka	Eswatini	Adil Butt	Willowmoore Park, Benoni	Botswana by 107 runs
6th Match	29 May	Malawi	Moazzam Baig	Mauritius	Abdul Tunda	Willowmoore Park, Benoni	Malawi by 45 runs
T20I 2080	30 May	Botswana	Karabo Motlhanka	Malawi	Moazzam Baig	Willowmoore Park, Benoni	Botswana by 100 runs
T20I 2081	30 May	Eswatini	Adil Butt	Mozambique	Filipe Cossa	Willowmoore Park, Benoni	Mozambique by 6 wickets
T20I 2082	1 June	Botswana	Karabo Motlhanka	Mozambique	Filipe Cossa	Willowmoore Park, Benoni	Botswana by 7 wickets
10th Match	1 June	Eswatini	Adil Butt	Mauritius	Mark Segers	Willowmoore Park, Benoni	Eswatini by 5 wickets

=== Nepal women in Malaysia ===
WT20I series
No.	Date	Home captain	Away captain	Venue	Result
WT20I 1452	29 May	Mas Elysa	Rubina Chhetry	UKM-YSD Cricket Oval, Bangi	Malaysia by 5 wickets
WT20I 1457	30 May	Mas Elysa	Rubina Chhetry	UKM-YSD Cricket Oval, Bangi	Nepal by 7 wickets
WT20I 1462	1 June	Mas Elysa	Rubina Chhetry	UKM-YSD Cricket Oval, Bangi	Nepal by 27 runs
WT20I 1470	3 June	Mas Elysa	Rubina Chhetry	UKM-YSD Cricket Oval, Bangi	Malaysia by 4 wickets
WT20I 1471	4 June	Mas Elysa	Rubina Chhetry	UKM-YSD Cricket Oval, Bangi	Nepal by 3 wickets

=== 2023 ICC Women's T20 World Cup Europe Qualifier Division Two ===
Pos	Team	Pld	W	L	NR	Pts	NRR
1	France	5	4	1	0	8	1.736
2	Italy	5	4	1	0	8	0.833
3	Jersey	5	3	2	0	6	2.674
4	Germany	5	3	2	0	6	0.939
5	Sweden	5	1	4	0	2	−1.408
6	Turkey	5	0	5	0	0	−5.507

Source: ESPNcricinfo

WT20I series
No.	Date	Team 1	Captain 1	Team 2	Captain 2	Venue	Result
WT20I 1453	29 May	Jersey	Chloe Greechan	Italy	Kumudu Peddrick	Grainville Cricket Ground, St Saviour	Jersey by 7 wickets
WT20I 1454	29 May	Sweden	Gunjan Shukla	Turkey	Burcu Taylan	FB Playing Fields, St Clement	Sweden by 10 wickets
WT20I 1455	29 May	France	Marie Violleau	Italy	Kumudu Peddrick	Grainville Cricket Ground, St Saviour	Italy by 6 wickets
WT20I 1456	29 May	Germany	Anuradha Doddaballapur	Turkey	Burcu Taylan	FB Playing Fields, St Clement	Germany by 10 wickets
WT20I 1458	30 May	Jersey	Chloe Greechan	Germany	Anuradha Doddaballapur	Grainville Cricket Ground, St Saviour	Germany by 9 wickets
WT20I 1459	30 May	France	Marie Violleau	Sweden	Gunjan Shukla	FB Playing Fields, St Clement	France by 48 runs
WT20I 1460	30 May	Jersey	Chloe Greechan	Turkey	Burcu Taylan	Grainville Cricket Ground, St Saviour	Jersey by 9 wickets
WT20I 1461	30 May	Italy	Kumudu Peddrick	Sweden	Gunjan Shukla	FB Playing Fields, St Clement	Italy by 36 runs
WT20I 1463	1 June	Germany	Anuradha Doddaballapur	Italy	Kumudu Peddrick	Grainville Cricket Ground, St Saviour	Italy by 7 wickets
WT20I 1464	1 June	France	Marie Violleau	Turkey	Burcu Taylan	FB Playing Fields, St Clement	France by 128 runs
WT20I 1465	1 June	Germany	Anuradha Doddaballapur	Sweden	Gunjan Shukla	Grainville Cricket Ground, St Saviour	Germany by 7 wickets
WT20I 1466	1 June	Jersey	Chloe Greechan	France	Marie Violleau	FB Playing Fields, St Clement	France by 6 runs
WT20I 1467	2 June	Italy	Kumudu Peddrick	Turkey	Burcu Taylan	Grainville Cricket Ground, St Saviour	Italy by 88 runs
WT20I 1468	2 June	Jersey	Chloe Greechan	Sweden	Gunjan Shukla	FB Playing Fields, St Clement	Jersey by 108 runs
WT20I 1469	2 June	France	Marie Violleau	Germany	Anuradha Doddaballapur	Grainville Cricket Ground, St Saviour	France by 13 runs

== June ==
=== 2023 Continent Cup T20 Africa ===
Pos	Team	Pld	W	L	NR	Pts	NRR
1	Uganda	9	8	1	0	16	2.483
2	Kenya	9	6	3	0	12	0.970
3	Botswana	9	2	7	0	4	−1.570
4	Rwanda	9	2	7	0	4	−1.815

Source: ESPNcricinfo

Round-robin
No.	Date	Team 1	Captain 1	Team 2	Captain 2	Venue	Result
T20I 2083	9 June	Kenya	Rakep Patel	Rwanda	Clinton Rubagumya	Gymkhana Club Ground, Nairobi	Kenya by 3 wickets
T20I 2084	9 June	Botswana	Karabo Motlhanka	Uganda	Brian Masaba	Gymkhana Club Ground, Nairobi	Uganda by 6 wickets
T20I 2086	10 June	Botswana	Karabo Motlhanka	Rwanda	Clinton Rubagumya	Gymkhana Club Ground, Nairobi	Botswana by 33 runs
T20I 2088	10 June	Kenya	Rakep Patel	Uganda	Brian Masaba	Gymkhana Club Ground, Nairobi	Kenya by 88 runs
T20I 2091	11 June	Kenya	Rakep Patel	Botswana	Karabo Motlhanka	Gymkhana Club Ground, Nairobi	Kenya by 8 wickets
T20I 2094	11 June	Rwanda	Clinton Rubagumya	Uganda	Riazat Ali Shah	Gymkhana Club Ground, Nairobi	Uganda by 8 wickets
T20I 2096	13 June	Botswana	Karabo Motlhanka	Rwanda	Clinton Rubagumya	Gymkhana Club Ground, Nairobi	Rwanda by 27 runs
T20I 2097	13 June	Kenya	Rakep Patel	Uganda	Brian Masaba	Gymkhana Club Ground, Nairobi	Uganda by 47 runs
T20I 2098	14 June	Botswana	Karabo Motlhanka	Uganda	Brian Masaba	Gymkhana Club Ground, Nairobi	Uganda by 64 runs
T20I 2099	14 June	Kenya	Rakep Patel	Rwanda	Clinton Rubagumya	Gymkhana Club Ground, Nairobi	Kenya by 7 wickets
T20I 2100	15 June	Rwanda	Clinton Rubagumya	Uganda	Brian Masaba	Gymkhana Club Ground, Nairobi	Uganda by 7 wickets
T20I 2101	15 June	Kenya	Rakep Patel	Botswana	Karabo Motlhanka	Gymkhana Club Ground, Nairobi	Botswana by 30 runs
T20I 2102	17 June	Botswana	Karabo Motlhanka	Uganda	Riazat Ali Shah	Gymkhana Club Ground, Nairobi	Uganda by 7 wickets
T20I 2103	17 June	Kenya	Rakep Patel	Rwanda	Clinton Rubagumya	Gymkhana Club Ground, Nairobi	Kenya by 7 wickets
T20I 2104	18 June	Botswana	Karabo Motlhanka	Rwanda	Clinton Rubagumya	Gymkhana Club Ground, Nairobi	Rwanda by 7 wickets
T20I 2105	18 June	Kenya	Rakep Patel	Uganda	Riazat Ali Shah	Gymkhana Club Ground, Nairobi	Uganda by 5 wickets
T20I 2106	19 June	Kenya	Rakep Patel	Botswana	Karabo Motlhanka	Gymkhana Club Ground, Nairobi	Kenya by 6 wickets
T20I 2107	19 June	Rwanda	Clinton Rubagumya	Uganda	Brian Masaba	Gymkhana Club Ground, Nairobi	Uganda by 94 runs
Play-offs
No.	Date	Team 1	Captain 1	Team 2	Captain 2	Venue	Result
T20I 2108	21 June	Kenya	Rakep Patel	Uganda	Brian Masaba	Gymkhana Club Ground, Nairobi	Uganda by 1 run

=== Belgium in Germany ===
T20I series
No.	Date	Home captain	Away captain	Venue	Result
T20I 2085	9 June	Venkatraman Ganesan	Sheraz Sheikh	Bayer Uerdingen Cricket Ground, Krefeld	Germany by 6 runs
T20I 2087	10 June	Venkatraman Ganesan	Sheraz Sheikh	Bayer Uerdingen Cricket Ground, Krefeld	Germany by 5 wickets
T20I 2090	10 June	Venkatraman Ganesan	Sheraz Sheikh	Bayer Uerdingen Cricket Ground, Krefeld	Germany by 4 wickets
T20I 2093	11 June	Venkatraman Ganesan	Sheraz Sheikh	Bayer Uerdingen Cricket Ground, Krefeld	Germany by 8 wickets

=== 2023 Kwibuka Women's T20 Tournament ===
Pos	Team	Pld	W	L	NR	Pts	NRR
1	Uganda	8	7	1	0	14	1.197
2	Rwanda	8	5	3	0	10	0.442
3	Nigeria	8	5	3	0	10	−0.019
4	Kenya	8	2	6	0	4	−0.794
5	Botswana	8	1	7	0	2	−0.817

Source: ESPNcricinfo

Round-robin
No.	Date	Team 1	Captain 1	Team 2	Captain 2	Venue	Result
WT20I 1472	10 June	Rwanda	Marie Bimenyimana	Botswana	Laura Mophakedi	Gahanga International Cricket Stadium, Kigali	Rwanda by 20 runs
WT20I 1473	10 June	Botswana	Laura Mophakedi	Uganda	Concy Aweko	IPRC Cricket Ground, Kigali	Uganda by 28 runs
WT20I 1474	10 June	Rwanda	Marie Bimenyimana	Nigeria	Blessing Etim	Gahanga International Cricket Stadium, Kigali	Nigeria by 6 wickets
WT20I 1475	11 June	Rwanda	Marie Bimenyimana	Kenya	Esther Wachira	IPRC Cricket Ground, Kigali	Rwanda by 8 wickets
WT20I 1476	11 June	Botswana	Laura Mophakedi	Nigeria	Blessing Etim	Gahanga International Cricket Stadium, Kigali	Nigeria by 6 wickets
WT20I 1477	11 June	Rwanda	Marie Bimenyimana	Uganda	Concy Aweko	IPRC Cricket Ground, Kigali	Uganda by 7 wickets
WT20I 1478	11 June	Kenya	Esther Wachira	Nigeria	Blessing Etim	Gahanga International Cricket Stadium, Kigali	Nigeria by 3 wickets
WT20I 1479	12 June	Nigeria	Blessimg Etim	Uganda	Concy Aweko	Gahanga International Cricket Stadium, Kigali	Uganda by 5 wickets
WT20I 1480	12 June	Botswana	Laura Mophakedi	Kenya	Esther Wachira	Gahanga International Cricket Stadium, Kigali	Kenya by 8 wickets
WT20I 1481	13 June	Kenya	Esther Wachira	Uganda	Concy Aweko	Gahanga International Cricket Stadium, Kigali	Uganda by 13 runs
WT20I 1483	14 June	Botswana	Laura Mophakedi	Uganda	Concy Aweko	IPRC Cricket Ground, Kigali	Uganda by 6 wickets
WT20I 1484	14 June	Kenya	Esther Wachira	Nigeria	Blessing Etim	Gahanga International Cricket Stadium, Kigali	Nigeria by 22 runs
WT20I 1485	14 June	Kenya	Esther Wachira	Uganda	Concy Aweko	IPRC Cricket Ground, Kigali	Uganda by 37 runs
WT20I 1486	14 June	Rwanda	Marie Bimenyimana	Nigeria	Blessing Etim	Gahanga International Cricket Stadium, Kigali	Rwanda by 9 wickets
WT20I 1487	15 June	Rwanda	Marie Bimenyimana	Uganda	Concy Aweko	IPRC Cricket Ground, Kigali	Uganda by 10 wickets
WT20I 1488	15 June	Botswana	Laura Mophakedi	Kenya	Esther Wachira	Gahanga International Cricket Stadium, Kigali	Match tied (Kenya won S/O)
WT20I 1489	15 June	Rwanda	Marie Bimenyimana	Kenya	Esther Wachira	IPRC Cricket Ground, Kigali	Rwanda by 7 wickets
WT20I 1490	15 June	Botswana	Laura Mophakedi	Nigeria	Blessing Etim	Gahanga International Cricket Stadium, Kigali	Botswana by 23 runs
WT20I 1491	16 June	Rwanda	Marie Bimenyimana	Botswana	Laura Mophakedi	Gahanga International Cricket Stadium, Kigali	Rwanda by 3 wickets
WT20I 1492	16 June	Nigeria	Blessing Etim	Uganda	Concy Aweko	Gahanga International Cricket Stadium, Kigali	Nigeria by 3 wickets
Play-offs
No.	Date	Team 1	Captain 1	Team 2	Captain 2	Venue	Result
WT20I 1493	17 June	Kenya	Esther Wachira	Nigeria	Blessing Etim	Gahanga International Cricket Stadium, Kigali	Kenya by 48 runs
WT20I 1494	17 June	Rwanda	Marie Bimenyimana	Uganda	Concy Aweko	Gahanga International Cricket Stadium, Kigali	Rwanda by 6 wickets

=== Hungary in Czech Republic ===
Central Europe Cup T20I series
No.	Date	Home captain	Away captain	Venue	Result
T20I 2089	10 June	Arun Ashokan	Abhijeet Ahuja	Vinoř Cricket Ground, Prague	Czech Republic by 9 runs
T20I 2092	11 June	Arun Ashokan	Abhijeet Ahuja	Vinoř Cricket Ground, Prague	Match tied (Czech Republic won S/O)
T20I 2095	11 June	Arun Ashokan	Abhijeet Ahuja	Vinoř Cricket Ground, Prague	Czech Republic by 3 wickets

=== Argentina women in Brazil ===
WT20I series
No.	Date	Home captain	Away captain	Venue	Result
WT20I 1495	17 June	Roberta Moretti Avery	Alison Stocks	Poços Oval, Poços de Caldas	Brazil by 10 wickets
WT20I 1496	17 June	Roberta Moretti Avery	Alison Stocks	Poços Oval, Poços de Caldas	Brazil by 85 runs
WT20I 1497	18 June	Roberta Moretti Avery	Alison Stocks	Poços Oval, Poços de Caldas	Brazil by 119 runs
WT20I 1498	19 June	Roberta Moretti Avery	Alison Stocks	Poços Oval, Poços de Caldas	Brazil by 89 runs
WT20I 1499	19 June	Roberta Moretti Avery	Alison Stocks	Poços Oval, Poços de Caldas	Brazil by 45 runs

=== 2023 Bulgaria Quadrangular Series ===
Pos	Team	Pld	W	L	NR	Pts	NRR
1	Serbia	3	3	0	0	6	3.054
2	Bulgaria	3	2	1	0	4	2.645
3	Turkey	3	1	2	0	2	0.125
4	Croatia	3	0	3	0	0	−7.576

Source: ESPNcricinfo

Round-robin
No.	Date	Team 1	Captain 1	Team 2	Captain 2	Venue	Result
T20I 2109	23 June	Serbia	Mark Pavlovic	Turkey	Mecit Ozturk	National Sports Academy, Sofia	Serbia by 70 runs
T20I 2110	23 June	Bulgaria	Dimo Nikolov	Croatia	Vedran Zanko	National Sports Academy, Sofia	Bulgaria by 9 wickets
T20I 2111	23 June	Bulgaria	Dimo Nikolov	Serbia	Mark Pavlovic	National Sports Academy, Sofia	Serbia by 5 wickets
T20I 2112	24 June	Croatia	Vedran Zanko	Turkey	Mecit Ozturk	National Sports Academy, Sofia	Turkey by 8 wickets
T20I 2114	24 June	Croatia	Vedran Zanko	Serbia	Mark Pavlovic	National Sports Academy, Sofia	Serbia by 9 wickets
T20I 2115	24 June	Bulgaria	Dimo Nikolov	Turkey	Mecit Ozturk	National Sports Academy, Sofia	Bulgaria by 8 wickets
Play-offs
No.	Date	Team 1	Captain 1	Team 2	Captain 2	Venue	Result
T20I 2116	25 June	Croatia	Vedran Zanko	Turkey	Mecit Ozturk	National Sports Academy, Sofia	No result
T20I 2118	25 June	Bulgaria	Dimo Nikolov	Serbia	Mark Pavlovic	National Sports Academy, Sofia	No result

=== Switzerland in Luxembourg ===
T20I series
No.	Date	Home captain	Away captain	Venue	Result
T20I 2113	24 June	Vikram Vijh	Ali Nayyer	Pierre Werner Cricket Ground, Walferdange	Luxembourg by 3 wickets
T20I 2117	25 June	Vikram Vijh	Ali Nayyer	Pierre Werner Cricket Ground, Walferdange	Switzerland by 8 wickets

=== Jersey women in Guernsey ===
Inter-Insular WT20I series
No.	Date	Home captain	Away captain	Venue	Result
WT20I 1500	24 June	Krista De La Mare	Chloe Greechan	King George V Sports Ground, Castel	Jersey by 61 runs
WT20I 1501	24 June	Krista De La Mare	Chloe Greechan	King George V Sports Ground, Castel	Jersey by 8 wickets
WT20I 1502	25 June	Krista De La Mare	Chloe Greechan	King George V Sports Ground, Castel	Jersey by 158 runs

=== Austria against Germany in the Netherlands ===
T20I series
No.	Date	Home captain	Away captain	Venue	Result
T20I 2119	29 June	Razmal Shigiwal	Venkatraman Ganesan	Sportpark Het Schootsveld, Deventer	Germany by 6 wickets
T20I 2120	30 June	Razmal Shigiwal	Venkatraman Ganesan	Sportpark Het Schootsveld, Deventer	Germany by 8 wickets

== July ==
=== Guernsey in Jersey ===
Inter-Insular T20I series
No.	Date	Home captain	Away captain	Venue	Result
T20I 2121	7 July	Charles Perchard	Josh Butler	Farmers Cricket Club Ground, St Martin	Jersey by 7 wickets
T20I 2122	8 July	Charles Perchard	Matthew Stokes	Farmers Cricket Club Ground, St Martin	Jersey by 4 wickets
T20I 2122a	8 July	Charles Perchard	Josh Butler	Farmers Cricket Club Ground, St Martin	Match abandoned

=== Austria in Isle of Man ===
T20I series
No.	Date	Home captain	Away captain	Venue	Result
T20I 2123	9 July	Matthew Ansell	Razmal Shigiwal	King William's College, Castletown	Isle of Man by 6 wickets
T20I 2124	9 July	Matthew Ansell	Razmal Shigiwal	King William's College, Castletown	Isle of Man by 5 wickets
T20I 2127	10 July	Matthew Ansell	Razmal Shigiwal	King William's College, Castletown	No result

=== 2023 Netherlands Women's Tri-Nation Series ===
Pos	Team	Pld	W	L	T	NR	Pts	NRR
1	Thailand	4	2	2	0	0	4	0.767
2	Netherlands	4	2	2	0	0	4	−0.148
3	Scotland	4	2	2	0	0	4	−0.593

Source: ESPNcricinfo

Round-robin
No.	Date	Team 1	Captain 1	Team 2	Captain 2	Venue	Result
WT20I 1512	10 July	Scotland	Abtaha Maqsood	Thailand	Naruemol Chaiwai	Sportpark Maarschalkerweerd, Utrecht	Thailand by 8 wickets
WT20I 1514	11 July	Netherlands	Heather Siegers	Thailand	Naruemol Chaiwai	Sportpark Maarschalkerweerd, Utrecht	Netherlands by 6 wickets
WT20I 1516	12 July	Netherlands	Heather Siegers	Scotland	Abtaha Maqsood	Sportpark Maarschalkerweerd, Utrecht	Scotland by 6 runs
WT20I 1518	13 July	Scotland	Kathryn Bryce	Thailand	Naruemol Chaiwai	Sportpark Maarschalkerweerd, Utrecht	Scotland by 6 wickets
WT20I 1519	14 July	Netherlands	Heather Siegers	Thailand	Naruemol Chaiwai	Sportpark Maarschalkerweerd, Utrecht	Thailand by 8 wickets
WT20I 1520	15 July	Netherlands	Heather Siegers	Scotland	Kathryn Bryce	Sportpark Maarschalkerweerd, Utrecht	Netherlands by 7 wickets

=== 2023 Mdina Cup ===
Pos	Team	Pld	W	L	NR	Pts	NRR
1	France	4	3	1	0	6	1.536
2	Malta	4	2	2	0	4	0.450
3	Luxembourg	4	1	3	0	2	−2.147

Source: ESPNcricinfo

T20I series
No.	Date	Team 1	Captain 1	Team 2	Captain 2	Venue	Result
T20I 2125	10 July	Malta	Bikram Arora	France	Noman Amjad	Marsa Sports Club, Marsa	France by 9 runs
T20I 2126	10 July	Malta	Varun Thamotharam	France	Noman Amjad	Marsa Sports Club, Marsa	Malta by 4 runs
T20I 2128	11 July	Malta	Varun Thamotharam	Luxembourg	Joost Mees	Marsa Sports Club, Marsa	Malta by 42 runs
T20I 2129	11 July	France	Noman Amjad	Luxembourg	Joost Mees	Marsa Sports Club, Marsa	France by 51 runs
T20I 2130	12 July	Malta	Varun Thamotharam	Luxembourg	Joost Mees	Marsa Sports Club, Marsa	Luxembourg by 4 wickets
T20I 2131	12 July	France	Noman Amjad	Luxembourg	Joost Mees	Marsa Sports Club, Marsa	France by 9 wickets

=== 2023 Valletta Cup ===
Pos	Team	Pld	W	L	NR	Pts	NRR
1	Switzerland	4	4	0	0	8	1.174
2	France	4	2	2	0	4	1.282
3	Malta	4	2	2	0	4	−0.070
4	Luxembourg	4	2	2	0	4	−0.226
5	Romania	4	0	4	0	0	−2.234

Source: ESPNcricinfo

Round-robin
No.	Date	Team 1	Captain 1	Team 2	Captain 2	Venue	Result
T20I 2132	12 July	Malta	Varun Thamotharam	France	Noman Amjad	Marsa Sports Club, Marsa	France by 30 runs
T20I 2133	13 July	Malta	Varun Thamotharam	Luxembourg	Joost Mees	Marsa Sports Club, Marsa	Malta by 6 wickets
T20I 2134	13 July	Romania	Ramesh Satheesan	Switzerland	Ali Nayyer	Marsa Sports Club, Marsa	Switzerland by 6 wickets
T20I 2135	13 July	France	Noman Amjad	Romania	Ramesh Satheesan	Marsa Sports Club, Marsa	France by 88 runs
T20I 2136	14 July	Luxembourg	Joost Mees	Switzerland	Ali Nayyer	Marsa Sports Club, Marsa	Switzerland by 8 wickets
T20I 2137	14 July	Malta	Varun Thamotharam	Romania	Ramesh Satheesan	Marsa Sports Club, Marsa	Malta by 41 runs
T20I 2139	14 July	France	Noman Amjad	Switzerland	Ali Nayyer	Marsa Sports Club, Marsa	Switzerland by 6 wickets
T20I 2140	15 July	Luxembourg	Vikram Vijh	Romania	Ramesh Satheesan	Marsa Sports Club, Marsa	Luxembourg by 7 wickets
T20I 2141	15 July	Malta	Varun Thamotharam	Switzerland	Ali Nayyer	Marsa Sports Club, Marsa	Switzerland by 6 wickets
T20I 2142	15 July	France	Noman Amjad	Luxembourg	Vikram Vijh	Marsa Sports Club, Marsa	Luxembourg by 4 wickets
Play-offs
No.	Date	Team 1	Captain 1	Team 2	Captain 2	Venue	Result
T20I 2143	16 July	Malta	Varun Thamotharam	France	Noman Amjad	Marsa Sports Club, Marsa	Malta by 7 wickets
T20I 2144	16 July	Luxembourg	Vikram Vijh	Romania	Ramesh Satheesan	Marsa Sports Club, Marsa	Romania by 7 wickets
T20I 2146	16 July	Malta	Varun Thamotharam	Switzerland	Ali Nayyer	Marsa Sports Club, Marsa	Switzerland by 6 wickets

=== 2022–23 ICC Men's T20 World Cup Europe Qualifier ===
Pos	Team	Pld	W	L	NR	Pts	NRR
1	Scotland	6	6	0	0	12	4.110
2	Ireland	6	4	1	1	9	2.716
3	Italy	6	3	2	1	7	−0.965
4	Jersey	6	3	3	0	6	0.431
5	Germany	6	2	3	1	5	−0.440
6	Denmark	6	1	5	0	2	−0.894
7	Austria	6	0	5	1	1	−5.885

Source: ESPNcricinfo

T20I series
No.	Date	Team 1	Captain 1	Team 2	Captain 2	Venue	Result
T20I 2147	20 July	Austria	Razmal Shigiwal	Jersey	Charles Perchard	The Grange Club, Edinburgh	Jersey by 8 wickets
T20I 2148	20 July	Ireland	Paul Stirling	Italy	Gareth Berg	Goldenacre Sports Ground, Edinburgh	Ireland by 7 runs
T20I 2149	20 July	Scotland	Richie Berrington	Germany	Venkatraman Ganesan	Goldenacre Sports Ground, Edinburgh	Scotland by 72 runs (DLS)
T20I 2150	21 July	Denmark	Taranjit Bharaj	Ireland	Paul Stirling	The Grange Club, Edinburgh	Ireland by 9 wickets
T20I 2151	21 July	Austria	Razmal Shigiwal	Germany	Venkatraman Ganesan	Goldenacre Sports Ground, Edinburgh	Germany by 9 wickets
T20I 2152	21 July	Scotland	Richie Berrington	Jersey	Charles Perchard	The Grange Club, Edinburgh	Scotland by 14 runs
T20I 2157	23 July	Austria	Razmal Shigiwal	Ireland	Paul Stirling	The Grange Club, Edinburgh	Ireland by 128 runs
T20I 2158	23 July	Italy	Gareth Berg	Jersey	Charles Perchard	Goldenacre Sports Ground, Edinburgh	Italy by 25 runs
T20I 2159	23 July	Denmark	Taranjit Bharaj	Germany	Venkatraman Ganesan	The Grange Club, Edinburgh	Germany by 6 wickets
T20I 2160	24 July	Scotland	Richie Berrington	Italy	Gareth Berg	The Grange Club, Edinburgh	Scotland by 155 runs
T20I 2161	24 July	Austria	Razmal Shigiwal	Denmark	Taranjit Bharaj	Goldenacre Sports Ground, Edinburgh	Denmark by 8 wickets
T20I 2162	24 July	Ireland	Paul Stirling	Jersey	Charles Perchard	Goldenacre Sports Ground, Edinburgh	Ireland by 9 wickets
T20I 2165	25 July	Denmark	Taranjit Bharaj	Italy	Gareth Berg	The Grange Club, Edinburgh	Italy by 26 runs
T20I 2166	25 July	Scotland	Richie Berrington	Austria	Razmal Shigiwal	Goldenacre Sports Ground, Edinburgh	Scotland by 166 runs
T20I 2167	25 July	Germany	Venkatraman Ganesan	Jersey	Charles Perchard	The Grange Club, Edinburgh	Jersey by 51 runs
T20I 2174	27 July	Scotland	Richie Berrington	Denmark	Hamid Shah	The Grange Club, Edinburgh	Scotland by 33 runs
T20I 2174a	27 July	Germany	Venkatraman Ganesan	Ireland	Paul Stirling	Goldenacre Sports Ground, Edinburgh	Match abandoned
T20I 2174b	27 July	Austria	Razmal Shigiwal	Italy	Gareth Berg	Goldenacre Sports Ground, Edinburgh	Match abandoned
T20I 2178	28 July	Germany	Venkatraman Ganesan	Italy	Gareth Berg	The Grange Club, Edinburgh	Italy by 4 wickets
T20I 2179	28 July	Denmark	Hamid Shah	Jersey	Charles Perchard	Goldenacre Sports Ground, Edinburgh	Jersey by 28 runs
T20I 2180	28 July	Scotland	Richie Berrington	Ireland	Paul Stirling	The Grange Club, Edinburgh	Scotland by 8 runs

=== 2022–23 ICC Men's T20 World Cup East Asia-Pacific Qualifier ===
Pos	Team	Pld	W	L	NR	Pts	NRR
1	Papua New Guinea	6	6	0	0	12	4.189
2	Japan	6	3	3	0	6	0.105
3	Vanuatu	6	2	4	0	4	−1.170
4	Philippines	6	1	5	0	2	−2.697

Source: ESPNcricinfo

T20I series
No.	Date	Team 1	Captain 1	Team 2	Captain 2	Venue	Result
T20I 2153	22 July	Japan	Kendel Kadowaki-Fleming	Philippines	Daniel Smith	Amini Park, Port Moresby	Japan by 53 runs
T20I 2154	22 July	Papua New Guinea	Assad Vala	Vanuatu	Patrick Matautaava	Amini Park, Port Moresby	Papua New Guinea by 9 wickets
T20I 2155	23 July	Japan	Kendel Kadowaki-Fleming	Vanuatu	Patrick Matautaava	Amini Park, Port Moresby	Japan by 21 runs
T20I 2156	23 July	Papua New Guinea	Assad Vala	Philippines	Daniel Smith	Amini Park, Port Moresby	Papua New Guinea by 117 runs
T20I 2163	25 July	Philippines	Daniel Smith	Vanuatu	Patrick Matautaava	Amini Park, Port Moresby	Philippines by 6 wickets
T20I 2164	25 July	Papua New Guinea	Assad Vala	Japan	Kendel Kadowaki-Fleming	Amini Park, Port Moresby	Papua New Guinea by 6 wickets
T20I 2168	26 July	Papua New Guinea	Assad Vala	Vanuatu	Patrick Matautaava	Amini Park, Port Moresby	Papua New Guinea by 39 runs
T20I 2170	26 July	Japan	Kendel Kadowaki-Fleming	Philippines	Daniel Smith	Amini Park, Port Moresby	Japan by 33 runs
T20I 2175	28 July	Japan	Kendel Kadowaki-Fleming	Vanuatu	Ronald Tari	Amini Park, Port Moresby	Vanuatu by 5 wickets
T20I 2177	28 July	Papua New Guinea	Assad Vala	Philippines	Daniel Smith	Amini Park, Port Moresby	Papua New Guinea by 100 runs
T20I 2181	29 July	Philippines	Daniel Smith	Vanuatu	Ronald Tari	Amini Park, Port Moresby	Vanuatu by 3 wickets
T20I 2182	29 July	Papua New Guinea	Assad Vala	Japan	Kendel Kadowaki-Fleming	Amini Park, Port Moresby	Papua New Guinea by 6 wickets

=== 2023 ICC Men's T20 World Cup Asia Qualifier B ===
Pos	Team	Pld	W	L	NR	Pts	NRR
1	Malaysia	4	4	0	0	8	5.986
2	Thailand	4	3	1	0	6	2.927
3	Bhutan	4	2	2	0	4	−0.085
4	China	4	1	3	0	2	−3.537
5	Myanmar	4	0	4	0	0	−4.196

Source: ESPNcricinfo

T20I series
No.	Date	Team 1	Captain 1	Team 2	Captain 2	Venue	Result
T20I 2169	26 July	Malaysia	Ahmad Faiz	China	Wang Qi	Bayuemas Oval, Pandamaran	Malaysia by 8 wickets
T20I 2171	26 July	Bhutan	Suprit Pradhan	Myanmar	Thuya Aung	Bayuemas Oval, Pandamaran	Bhutan by 31 runs
T20I 2172	27 July	China	Wang Qi	Thailand	Akshaykumar Yadav	Bayuemas Oval, Pandamaran	Thailand by 9 wickets
T20I 2173	27 July	Malaysia	Ahmad Faiz	Bhutan	Suprit Pradhan	Bayuemas Oval, Pandamaran	Malaysia by 75 runs
T20I 2176	28 July	Myanmar	Thuya Aung	Thailand	Akshaykumar Yadav	Bayuemas Oval, Pandamaran	Thailand by 101 runs
T20I 2183	30 July	Bhutan	Suprit Pradhan	China	Wang Qi	Bayuemas Oval, Pandamaran	Bhutan by 95 runs (DLS)
T20I 2184	30 July	Malaysia	Ahmad Faiz	Myanmar	Thuya Aung	Bayuemas Oval, Pandamaran	Malaysia by 184 runs
T20I 2185	31 July	Bhutan	Suprit Pradhan	Thailand	Akshaykumar Yadav	Bayuemas Oval, Pandamaran	Thailand by 8 wickets
T20I 2186	31 July	China	Wang Qi	Myanmar	Thuya Aung	Bayuemas Oval, Pandamaran	China by 5 wickets
T20I 2187	1 August	Malaysia	Ahmad Faiz	Thailand	Akshaykumar Yadav	Bayuemas Oval, Pandamaran	Malaysia by 7 wickets

=== Isle of Man women in Austria ===
WT20I series
No.	Date	Home captain	Away captain	Venue	Result
WT20I 1521	30 July	Jo-Antoinette Stiglitz	Alanya Thorpe	Seebarn Cricket Ground, Lower Austria	Isle of Man by 7 wickets
WT20I 1522	30 July	Jo-Antoinette Stiglitz	Alanya Thorpe	Seebarn Cricket Ground, Lower Austria	Isle of Man by 2 wickets
WT20I 1523	31 July	Jo-Antoinette Stiglitz	Alanya Thorpe	Seebarn Cricket Ground, Lower Austria	Isle of Man by 8 wickets

== August ==
=== 2023 Women's Continental Cup ===
Pos	Team	Pld	W	L	NR	Pts	NRR
1	Isle of Man	3	3	0	0	6	7.660
2	Greece	3	2	1	0	4	1.450
3	Romania	3	1	2	0	2	−3.403
4	Malta	3	0	3	0	0	−3.923

Source: ESPNcricinfo

Round-robin
No.	Date	Team 1	Captain 1	Team 2	Captain 2	Venue	Result
WT20I 1524	4 August	Greece	Sofia-nefeli Georgota	Isle of Man	Alanya Thorpe	Moara Vlasiei Cricket Ground, Ilfov County	Isle of Man by 10 wickets
WT20I 1525	4 August	Greece	Sofia-nefeli Georgota	Malta	Jessica Rymer	Moara Vlasiei Cricket Ground, Ilfov County	Greece by 9 wickets
WT20I 1526	4 August	Romania	Rebecca Blake	Isle of Man	Alanya Thorpe	Moara Vlasiei Cricket Ground, Ilfov County	Isle of Man by 10 wickets
WT20I 1527	5 August	Romania	Rebecca Blake	Greece	Sofia-nefeli Georgota	Moara Vlasiei Cricket Ground, Ilfov County	Greece by 82 runs
WT20I 1528	5 August	Isle of Man	Alanya Thorpe	Malta	Jessica Rymer	Moara Vlasiei Cricket Ground, Ilfov County	Isle of Man by 7 wickets
WT20I 1529	5 August	Romania	Rebecca Blake	Malta	Jessica Rymer	Moara Vlasiei Cricket Ground, Ilfov County	Romania by 35 runs
Play-offs
No.	Date	Team 1	Captain 1	Team 2	Captain 2	Venue	Result
WT20I 1530	6 August	Romania	Rebecca Blake	Malta	Jessica Rymer	Moara Vlasiei Cricket Ground, Ilfov County	Malta by 7 wickets
WT20I 1531	6 August	Greece	Sofia-nefeli Georgota	Isle of Man	Alanya Thorpe	Moara Vlasiei Cricket Ground, Ilfov County	Isle of Man by 9 wickets

=== Croatia in Hungary ===
T20I series
No.	Date	Home captain	Away captain	Venue	Result
T20I 2189	5 August	Vinoth Ravindran	Vedran Zanko	GB Oval, Sződliget	Hungary by 145 runs
T20I 2189a	6 August	Vinoth Ravindran	Vedran Zanko	GB Oval, Sződliget	Match abandoned
T20I 2190	6 August	Vinoth Ravindran	Vedran Zanko	GB Oval, Sződliget	Hungary by 7 wickets

=== Germany against Guernsey in the Netherlands ===
T20I series
No.	Date	Home captain	Away captain	Venue	Result
T20I 2195	14 August	Venkatraman Ganesan	Matthew Stokes	Sportpark Het Schootsveld, Deventer	Germany by 9 wickets
T20I 2196	14 August	Venkatraman Ganesan	Matthew Stokes	Sportpark Het Schootsveld, Deventer	Guernsey by 5 wickets
T20I 2197	15 August	Venkatraman Ganesan	Matthew Stokes	Sportpark Het Schootsveld, Deventer	Guernsey by 10 runs

=== 2023 Men's Continental Cup ===
During the first match on 20 August, Malta's Fanyan Mughal became the first player in recorded international cricket to be dismissed for hitting the ball twice.

T20I series
No.	Date	Team 1	Captain 1	Team 2	Captain 2	Venue	Result
1st Match	18 August	Romania A	Aftab Kayani	Malta	Zeeshan Khan	Moara Vlasiei Cricket Ground, Ilfov County	Malta by 7 wickets
2nd Match	18 August	Romania	Vasu Saini	Romania A	Aftab Kayani	Moara Vlasiei Cricket Ground, Ilfov County	Romania by 5 wickets
T20I 2199	18 August	Romania	Ramesh Satheesan	Malta	Varun Thamotharam	Moara Vlasiei Cricket Ground, Ilfov County	Malta by 8 wickets
T20I 2201	19 August	Romania	Ramesh Satheesan	Malta	Varun Thamotharam	Moara Vlasiei Cricket Ground, Ilfov County	Malta by 4 wickets
5th Match	19 August	Romania	Sharat Kishore	Romania A	Aftab Kayani	Moara Vlasiei Cricket Ground, Ilfov County	Romania A by 78 runs
T20I 2202	19 August	Romania	Ramesh Satheesan	Malta	Bikram Arora	Moara Vlasiei Cricket Ground, Ilfov County	Romania by 3 wickets
T20I 2204	20 August	Romania	Ramesh Satheesan	Malta	Varun Thamotharam	Moara Vlasiei Cricket Ground, Ilfov County	Romania by 9 wickets
T20I 2206	20 August	Romania	Ramesh Satheesan	Malta	Varun Thamotharam	Moara Vlasiei Cricket Ground, Ilfov County	Romania by 6 runs

=== 2023 East Africa T20 Cup ===
Pos	Team	Pld	W	L	NR	Pts	NRR
1	Uganda	12	11	1	0	22	2.272
2	Tanzania	12	6	6	0	12	−0.125
3	Rwanda	12	1	11	0	2	−2.163

Source: ESPNcricinfo

T20I series
No.	Date	Team 1	Captain 1	Team 2	Captain 2	Venue	Result
T20I 2205	20 August	Rwanda	Clinton Rubagumya	Uganda	Brian Masaba	Gahanga International Cricket Stadium, Kigali	Uganda by 40 runs
T20I 2207	20 August	Tanzania	Abhik Patwa	Uganda	Brian Masaba	Gahanga International Cricket Stadium, Kigali	Uganda by 6 wickets
T20I 2210	21 August	Rwanda	Didier Ndikubwimana	Tanzania	Abhik Patwa	Gahanga International Cricket Stadium, Kigali	Rwanda by 7 wickets
T20I 2211	21 August	Tanzania	Abhik Patwa	Uganda	Brian Masaba	Gahanga International Cricket Stadium, Kigali	Tanzania by 3 wickets
T20I 2212	22 August	Rwanda	Clinton Rubagumya	Uganda	Brian Masaba	Gahanga International Cricket Stadium, Kigali	Uganda by 61 runs
T20I 2213	22 August	Rwanda	Clinton Rubagumya	Tanzania	Abhik Patwa	Gahanga International Cricket Stadium, Kigali	Tanzania by 7 wickets
T20I 2214	24 August	Rwanda	Clinton Rubagumya	Uganda	Brian Masaba	Gahanga International Cricket Stadium, Kigali	Uganda by 86 runs
T20I 2215	24 August	Tanzania	Abhik Patwa	Uganda	Brian Masaba	Gahanga International Cricket Stadium, Kigali	Uganda by 60 runs
T20I 2216	25 August	Rwanda	Clinton Rubagumya	Tanzania	Abhik Patwa	Gahanga International Cricket Stadium, Kigali	Tanzania by 1 wicket
T20I 2217	25 August	Tanzania	Abhik Patwa	Uganda	Brian Masaba	Gahanga International Cricket Stadium, Kigali	Uganda by 19 runs
T20I 2218	27 August	Rwanda	Clinton Rubagumya	Tanzania	Abhik Patwa	Gahanga International Cricket Stadium, Kigali	Tanzania by 9 runs
T20I 2219	27 August	Rwanda	Clinton Rubagumya	Uganda	Brian Masaba	Gahanga International Cricket Stadium, Kigali	Uganda by 6 wickets
T20I 2220	28 August	Tanzania	Abhik Patwa	Uganda	Brian Masaba	Gahanga International Cricket Stadium, Kigali	Uganda by 59 runs
T20I 2221	28 August	Rwanda	Clinton Rubagumya	Uganda	Kenneth Waiswa	Gahanga International Cricket Stadium, Kigali	Uganda by 8 wickets
T20I 2222	30 August	Tanzania	Abhik Patwa	Uganda	Brian Masaba	Gahanga International Cricket Stadium, Kigali	Uganda by 19 runs
T20I 2223	30 August	Rwanda	Clinton Rubagumya	Tanzania	Abhik Patwa	Gahanga International Cricket Stadium, Kigali	Tanzania by 59 runs
T20I 2226	31 August	Rwanda	Clinton Rubagumya	Uganda	Kenneth Waiswa	Gahanga International Cricket Stadium, Kigali	Uganda by 8 wickets
T20I 2227	31 August	Rwanda	Clinton Rubagumya	Tanzania	Abhik Patwa	Gahanga International Cricket Stadium, Kigali	Tanzania by 49 runs

=== 2023 Malaysia Women's Quadrangular Series ===
Pos	Team	Pld	W	L	NR	Pts	NRR
1	Nepal	3	2	1	0	4	0.853
2	Hong Kong	3	2	1	0	4	0.193
3	Malaysia	3	2	1	0	4	0.007
4	Kuwait	3	0	3	0	0	−1.244

Source: ESPNcricinfo

Round-robin
No.	Date	Team 1	Captain 1	Team 2	Captain 2	Venue	Result
WT20I 1535	22 August	Malaysia	Mas Elysa	Kuwait	Amna Tariq	Bayuemas Oval, Pandamaran	Malaysia by 8 wickets
WT20I 1536	22 August	Hong Kong	Kary Chan	Nepal	Rubina Chhetry	Bayuemas Oval, Pandamaran	Nepal by 6 wickets
WT20I 1537	23 August	Malaysia	Mas Elysa	Hong Kong	Kary Chan	Bayuemas Oval, Pandamaran	Hong Kong by 10 wickets (DLS)
WT20I 1538	23 August	Kuwait	Amna Tariq	Nepal	Rubina Chhetry	Bayuemas Oval, Pandamaran	Nepal by 34 runs
WT20I 1542	25 August	Hong Kong	Kary Chan	Kuwait	Amna Tariq	Bayuemas Oval, Pandamaran	Hong Kong by 16 runs
WT20I 1543	25 August	Malaysia	Mas Elysa	Nepal	Rubina Chhetry	Bayuemas Oval, Pandamaran	Malaysia by 6 wickets (DLS)
Play-offs
No.	Date	Team 1	Captain 1	Team 2	Captain 2	Venue	Result
WT20I 1547	26 August	Malaysia	Mas Elysa	Kuwait	Amna Tariq	Bayuemas Oval, Pandamaran	Malaysia by 35 runs
WT20I 1548	26 August	Hong Kong	Kary Chan	Nepal	Rubina Chhetry	Bayuemas Oval, Pandamaran	Nepal by 13 runs (DLS)

=== Jersey women in the Netherlands ===
WT20I series
No.	Date	Home captain	Away captain	Venue	Result
WT20I 1539	24 August	Heather Siegers	Chloe Greechan	Sportpark Maarschalkerweerd, Utrecht	Netherlands by 69 runs
WT20I 1541	24 August	Heather Siegers	Chloe Greechan	Sportpark Maarschalkerweerd, Utrecht	Netherlands by 50 runs
WT20I 1545	25 August	Heather Siegers	Chloe Greechan	Sportpark Maarschalkerweerd, Utrecht	No result

=== Myanmar women in Singapore ===
WT20I series
No.	Date	Home captain	Away captain	Venue	Result
WT20I 1540	24 August	Shafina Mahesh	Zar Win	Indian Association Ground, Singapore	Myanmar by 4 wickets
WT20I 1551	26 August	Shafina Mahesh	Zar Win	Indian Association Ground, Singapore	Myanmar by 2 wickets
WT20I 1553	27 August	Shafina Mahesh	Zar Win	Turf City B Cricket Ground, Singapore	Myanmar by 9 wickets

=== 2023 Women's T20I Nordic Cup ===
Pos	Team	Pld	W	L	NR	Pts	NRR
1	Sweden	5	5	0	0	10	4.852
2	Finland XI	5	2	1	2	6	2.000
3	Denmark	5	1	2	2	4	−2.054
4	Norway	6	1	4	1	3	−1.588
5	Estonia	3	0	2	1	1	−4.945

Source: ESPNcricinfo

Round-robin
No.	Date	Team 1	Captain 1	Team 2	Captain 2	Venue	Result
1st Match	25 August	Finland XI	Traijila Mulepati	Sweden	Gunjan Shukla	Tikkurila Cricket Ground, Vantaa	Sweden by 76 runs (DLS)
WT20I 1544	25 August	Denmark	Line Leisner	Norway	Ramya Immadi	Kerava National Cricket Ground, Kerava	Denmark by 6 wickets
WT20I 1546	25 August	Denmark	Line Leisner	Sweden	Gunjan Shukla	Tikkurila Cricket Ground, Vantaa	Sweden by 9 wickets
4th Match	25 August	Finland XI	Traijila Mulepati	Norway	Ramya Immadi	Kerava National Cricket Ground, Kerava	Finland XI by 55 runs
WT20I 1549	26 August	Estonia	Janika Horn	Norway	Ramya Immadi	Tikkurila Cricket Ground, Vantaa	Norway by 9 wickets
WT20I 1550	26 August	Denmark	Line Leisner	Sweden	Gunjan Shukla	Kerava National Cricket Ground, Kerava	Sweden by 10 wickets
7th Match	26 August	Finland XI	Traijila Mulepati	Estonia	Janika Horn	Kerava National Cricket Ground, Kerava	Finland XI by 127 runs
WT20I 1552	26 August	Norway	Ramya Immadi	Sweden	Gunjan Shukla	Tikkurila Cricket Ground, Vantaa	Sweden by 6 wickets
9th Match	27 August	Finland XI	Traijila Mulepati	Estonia	Janika Horn	Tikkurila Cricket Ground, Vantaa	Match abandoned
WT20I 1553a	27 August	Denmark	Line Leisner	Norway	Ramya Immadi	Kerava National Cricket Ground, Kerava	Match abandoned
WT20I 1555	27 August	Norway	Ramya Immadi	Sweden	Signe Lundell	Tikkurila Cricket Ground, Vantaa	Sweden by 4 wickets
12th Match	27 August	Finland XI	Traijila Mulepati	Denmark	Line Leisner	Kerava National Cricket Ground, Kerava	No result

=== Guernsey women in Austria ===
WT20I series
No.	Date	Home captain	Away captain	Venue	Result
WT20I 1554	27 August	Jo-Antoinette Stiglitz	Krista De La Mare	Seebarn Cricket Ground, Lower Austria	Guernsey by 5 wickets
WT20I 1556	27 August	Jo-Antoinette Stiglitz	Krista De La Mare	Seebarn Cricket Ground, Lower Austria	Guernsey by 8 runs
WT20I 1558	28 August	Jo-Antoinette Stiglitz	Krista De La Mare	Seebarn Cricket Ground, Lower Austria	Austria by 15 runs
WT20I 1559	28 August	Jo-Antoinette Stiglitz	Krista De La Mare	Seebarn Cricket Ground, Lower Austria	Guernsey by 28 runs

=== Japan women in Vanuatu ===
WT20I series
No.	Date	Home captain	Away captain	Venue	Result
WT20I 1557	28 August	Selina Solman	Mai Yanagida	Vanuatu Cricket Ground, Port Vila	Vanuatu by 8 wickets
WT20I 1560	30 August	Selina Solman	Mai Yanagida	Vanuatu Cricket Ground, Port Vila	Vanuatu by 15 runs

=== 2023 ICC Women's T20 World Cup Asia Qualifier ===
Pos	Team	Pld	W	L	NR	Pts	NRR
1	United Arab Emirates	5	4	0	1	9	3.339
2	Nepal	5	4	0	1	9	2.184
3	Malaysia	5	2	2	1	5	0.647
4	Bhutan	5	1	3	1	3	−1.306
5	Bahrain	5	1	3	1	3	−2.773
6	Qatar	5	0	4	1	1	−1.647

Source: ESPNcricinfo

Pos	Team	Pld	W	L	NR	Pts	NRR
1	Thailand	4	3	0	1	7	3.558
2	Hong Kong	4	3	1	0	6	0.999
3	Kuwait	4	2	1	1	5	−0.239
4	China	4	1	3	0	2	−1.147
5	Myanmar	4	0	4	0	0	−2.550

Source: ESPNcricinfo

Group stage
No.	Date	Team 1	Captain 1	Team 2	Captain 2	Venue	Result
WT20I 1561	31 August	Malaysia	Winifred Duraisingam	Nepal	Rubina Chhetry	Bayuemas Oval, Pandamaran	Nepal by 5 runs
WT20I 1562	31 August	Bahrain	Deepika Rasangika	Qatar	Aysha	UKM-YSD Cricket Oval, Bangi	Bahrain by 5 wickets
WT20I 1563	31 August	Bhutan	Dechen Wangmo	United Arab Emirates	Chaya Mughal	Selangor Turf Club, Seri Kembangan	United Arab Emirates by 9 wickets
WT20I 1564	31 August	China	Han Lili	Kuwait	Amna Tariq	Bayuemas Oval, Pandamaran	Kuwait by 30 runs
WT20I 1565	31 August	Hong Kong	Kary Chan	Myanmar	Zar Win	UKM-YSD Cricket Oval, Bangi	Hong Kong by 10 wickets
WT20I 1568	1 September	Myanmar	Zar Win	Thailand	Naruemol Chaiwai	Bayuemas Oval, Pandamaran	Thailand by 100 runs
WT20I 1569	1 September	China	Han Lili	Hong Kong	Kary Chan	Selangor Turf Club, Seri Kembangan	Hong Kong by 5 wickets
WT20I 1572	1 September	Bhutan	Dechen Wangmo	Qatar	Aysha	Bayuemas Oval, Pandamaran	Bhutan by 8 wickets
WT20I 1573	1 September	Malaysia	Winifred Duraisingam	United Arab Emirates	Chaya Mughal	UKM-YSD Cricket Oval, Bangi	United Arab Emirates by 7 wickets
WT20I 1574	1 September	Bahrain	Deepika Rasangika	Nepal	Rubina Chhetry	Selangor Turf Club, Seri Kembangan	Nepal by 10 wickets
WT20I 1583	3 September	Malaysia	Winifred Duraisingam	Bahrain	Deepika Rasangika	Bayuemas Oval, Pandamaran	Malaysia by 46 runs
WT20I 1584	3 September	Bhutan	Dechen Wangmo	Nepal	Rubina Chhetry	UKM-YSD Cricket Oval, Bangi	Nepal by 7 wickets
WT20I 1585	3 September	Qatar	Aysha	United Arab Emirates	Chaya Mughal	Selangor Turf Club, Seri Kembangan	United Arab Emirates by 51 runs
WT20I 1586	3 September	Hong Kong	Kary Chan	Kuwait	Amna Tariq	Bayuemas Oval, Pandamaran	Hong Kong by 8 wickets
WT20I 1587	3 September	China	Han Lili	Thailand	Naruemol Chaiwai	UKM-YSD Cricket Oval, Bangi	Thailand by 9 wickets
WT20I 1595	4 September	Bahrain	Deepika Rasangika	United Arab Emirates	Chaya Mughal	Bayuemas Oval, Pandamaran	United Arab Emirates by 69 runs (DLS)
WT20I 1596	4 September	Nepal	Rubina Chhetry	Qatar	Aysha	UKM-YSD Cricket Oval, Bangi	Nepal by 9 wickets
WT20I 1597	4 September	Malaysia	Winifred Duraisingam	Bhutan	Dechen Wangmo	Selangor Turf Club, Seri Kembangan	Malaysia by 8 wickets
WT20I 1600	4 September	China	Han Lili	Myanmar	Zar Win	UKM-YSD Cricket Oval, Bangi	China by 9 wickets
WT20I 1601	4 September	Kuwait	Amna Tariq	Thailand	Naruemol Chaiwai	Selangor Turf Club, Seri Kembangan	No result
WT20I 1616a	6 September	Malaysia	Winifred Duraisingam	Qatar	Aysha	Bayuemas Oval, Pandamaran	Match abandoned
WT20I 1616b	6 September	Bahrain	Deepika Rasangika	Bhutan	Dechen Wangmo	UKM-YSD Cricket Oval, Bangi	Match abandoned
WT20I 1616c	6 September	United Arab Emirates	Chaya Mughal	Nepal	Rubina Chhetry	Selangor Turf Club, Seri Kembangan	Match abandoned
WT20I 1617	6 September	Kuwait	Amna Tariq	Myanmar	Zar Win	Bayuemas Oval, Pandamaran	Kuwait by 7 runs
WT20I 1618	6 September	Hong Kong	Kary Chan	Thailand	Naruemol Chaiwai	UKM-YSD Cricket Oval, Bangi	Thailand by 43 runs
Play-offs
No.	Date	Team 1	Captain 1	Team 2	Captain 2	Venue	Result
WT20I 1638	8 September	Hong Kong	Kary Chan	United Arab Emirates	Chaya Mughal	Bayuemas Oval, Pandamaran	United Arab Emirates by 57 runs
WT20I 1639	8 September	Nepal	Rubina Chhetry	Thailand	Naruemol Chaiwai	UKM-YSD Cricket Oval, Bangi	Thailand by 46 runs
WT20I 1650	9 September	Thailand	Naruemol Chaiwai	United Arab Emirates	Chaya Mughal	Bayuemas Oval, Pandamaran	United Arab Emirates won by 6 runs

== September ==
=== 2023 ICC Women's T20 World Cup East Asia-Pacific Qualifier ===
Pos	Team	Pld	W	L	NR	Pts	NRR
1	Vanuatu	6	6	0	0	12	2.401
2	Papua New Guinea	6	5	1	0	10	3.623
3	Indonesia	6	4	2	0	8	1.071
4	Japan	6	3	3	0	6	−0.036
5	Samoa	6	1	5	0	2	−2.003
6	Cook Islands	6	1	5	0	2	−2.199
7	Fiji	6	1	5	0	2	−2.964

Source: ESPNcricinfo

WT20I series
No.	Date	Team 1	Captain 1	Team 2	Captain 2	Venue	Result
WT20I 1567	1 September	Cook Islands	June George	Japan	Mai Yanagida	Vanuatu Cricket Ground, Port Vila	Japan by 30 runs
WT20I 1570	1 September	Fiji	Ilisapeci Waqavakatoga	Samoa	Taofi Lafai	Vanuatu Cricket Ground (Oval 2), Port Vila	Fiji by 18 runs
WT20I 1571	1 September	Vanuatu	Selina Solman	Papua New Guinea	Kaia Arua	Vanuatu Cricket Ground, Port Vila	Vanuatu by 5 wickets
WT20I 1576	2 September	Cook Islands	June George	Papua New Guinea	Kaia Arua	Vanuatu Cricket Ground, Port Vila	Papua New Guinea by 100 runs
WT20I 1577	2 September	Japan	Mai Yanagida	Samoa	Taofi Lafai	Vanuatu Cricket Ground (Oval 2), Port Vila	Japan by 48 runs
WT20I 1593	4 September	Vanuatu	Selina Solman	Cook Islands	June George	Vanuatu Cricket Ground (Oval 2), Port Vila	Vanuatu by 8 wickets
WT20I 1594	4 September	Papua New Guinea	Kaia Arua	Samoa	Taofi Lafai	Vanuatu Cricket Ground, Port Vila	Papua New Guinea by 9 wickets
WT20I 1598	4 September	Cook Islands	June George	Indonesia	Ni Wayan Sariani	Vanuatu Cricket Ground, Port Vila	Indonesia by 66 runs
WT20I 1599	4 September	Fiji	Ilisapeci Waqavakatoga	Japan	Mai Yanagida	Vanuatu Cricket Ground (Oval 2), Port Vila	Japan by 8 wickets
WT20I 1605	5 September	Japan	Mai Yanagida	Papua New Guinea	Kaia Arua	Vanuatu Cricket Ground, Port Vila	Papua New Guinea by 9 wickets
WT20I 1606	5 September	Fiji	Ilisapeci Waqavakatoga	Indonesia	Ni Wayan Sariani	Vanuatu Cricket Ground (Oval 2), Port Vila	Indonesia by 10 wickets
WT20I 1607	5 September	Vanuatu	Selina Solman	Fiji	Ilisapeci Waqavakatoga	Vanuatu Cricket Ground, Port Vila	Vanuatu by 128 runs
WT20I 1608	5 September	Indonesia	Ni Wayan Sariani	Samoa	Taofi Lafai	Vanuatu Cricket Ground (Oval 2), Port Vila	Indonesia by 10 wickets
WT20I 1625	7 September	Indonesia	Ni Wayan Sariani	Japan	Mai Yanagida	Vanuatu Cricket Ground, Port Vila	Indonesia by 9 wickets
WT20I 1626	7 September	Fiji	Ilisapeci Waqavakatoga	Papua New Guinea	Kaia Arua	Vanuatu Cricket Ground (Oval 2), Port Vila	Papua New Guinea by 9 wickets
WT20I 1627	7 September	Cook Islands	June George	Samoa	Taofi Lafai	Vanuatu Cricket Ground, Port Vila	Samoa by 39 runs
WT20I 1628	7 September	Vanuatu	Selina Solman	Indonesia	Ni Wayan Sariani	Vanuatu Cricket Ground (Oval 2), Port Vila	Vanuatu by 20 runs
WT20I 1636	8 September	Vanuatu	Selina Solman	Samoa	Taofi Lafai	Vanuatu Cricket Ground, Port Vila	Vanuatu by 7 wickets
WT20I 1637	8 September	Cook Islands	June George	Fiji	Ilisapeci Waqavakatoga	Vanuatu Cricket Ground (Oval 2), Port Vila	Cook Islands by 8 wickets
WT20I 1640	8 September	Indonesia	Ni Wayan Sariani	Papua New Guinea	Kaia Arua	Vanuatu Cricket Ground, Port Vila	Papua New Guinea by 37 runs
WT20I 1641	8 September	Vanuatu	Selina Solman	Japan	Mai Yanagida	Vanuatu Cricket Ground (Oval 2), Port Vila	Vanuatu by 21 runs

=== 2023 ICC Women's T20 World Cup Africa Qualifier Division Two ===
Pos	Team	Pld	W	L	NR	Pts	NRR
1	Kenya	3	3	0	0	6	6.719
2	Botswana	3	2	1	0	4	1.117
3	Malawi	3	1	2	0	2	1.445
4	Lesotho	3	0	3	0	0	−8.617

Source: ESPNcricinfo

Pos	Team	Pld	W	L	NR	Pts	NRR
1	Sierra Leone	3	3	0	0	6	6.195
2	Cameroon	3	2	1	0	4	0.587
3	Mozambique	3	1	2	0	2	0.140
4	Eswatini	3	0	3	0	0	−5.183

Source: ESPNcricinfo

Group stage
No.	Date	Team 1	Captain 1	Team 2	Captain 2	Venue	Result
WT20I 1578	2 September	Botswana	Laura Mophakedi	Kenya	Esther Wachira	Botswana Cricket Association Oval 1, Gaborone	Kenya by 111 runs
WT20I 1579	2 September	Lesotho	Maneo Nyabela	Malawi	Vanessa Phiri	Botswana Cricket Association Oval 2, Gaborone	Malawi by 136 runs
WT20I 1580	2 September	Eswatini	Ntombizonke Mkhatshwa	Mozambique	Palmira Cuinica	Botswana Cricket Association Oval 1, Gaborone	Mozambique by 102 runs
WT20I 1581	2 September	Cameroon	Michele Ekani	Sierra Leone	Fatmata Parkinson	Botswana Cricket Association Oval 2, Gaborone	Sierra Leone by 7 wickets
WT20I 1588	3 September	Kenya	Esther Wachira	Malawi	Vanessa Phiri	Botswana Cricket Association Oval 1, Gaborone	Kenya by 7 wickets
WT20I 1589	3 September	Botswana	Laura Mophakedi	Lesotho	Maneo Nyabela	Botswana Cricket Association Oval 2, Gaborone	Botswana by 173 runs
WT20I 1590	3 September	Mozambique	Palmira Cuinica	Sierra Leone	Fatmata Parkinson	Botswana Cricket Association Oval 1, Gaborone	Sierra Leone by 10 wickets
WT20I 1591	3 September	Cameroon	Michele Ekani	Eswatini	Ntombizonke Mkhatshwa	Botswana Cricket Association Oval 2, Gaborone	Cameroon by 62 runs
WT20I 1610	5 September	Cameroon	Michele Ekani	Mozambique	Palmira Cuinica	Botswana Cricket Association Oval 1, Gaborone	Cameroon by 33 runs
WT20I 1611	5 September	Eswatini	Ntombizonke Mkhatshwa	Sierra Leone	Fatmata Parkinson	Botswana Cricket Association Oval 2, Gaborone	Sierra Leone by 147 runs
WT20I 1612	5 September	Botswana	Laura Mophakedi	Malawi	Vanessa Phiri	Botswana Cricket Association Oval 1, Gaborone	Botswana by 5 runs
WT20I 1613	5 September	Kenya	Esther Wachira	Lesotho	Maneo Nyabela	Botswana Cricket Association Oval 2, Gaborone	Kenya by 208 runs
Play-offs
No.	Date	Team 1	Captain 1	Team 2	Captain 2	Venue	Result
WT20I 1619	6 September	Botswana	Laura Mophakedi	Sierra Leone	Fatmata Parkinson	Botswana Cricket Association Oval 1, Gaborone	Botswana by 17 runs
WT20I 1621	6 September	Cameroon	Michele Ekani	Kenya	Esther Wachira	Botswana Cricket Association Oval 1, Gaborone	Kenya by 118 runs
WT20I 1643	8 September	Cameroon	Michele Ekani	Sierra Leone	Fatmata Parkinson	Botswana Cricket Association Oval 1, Gaborone	Sierra Leone by 7 wickets
WT20I 1645	8 September	Botswana	Laura Mophakedi	Kenya	Esther Wachira	Botswana Cricket Association Oval 1, Gaborone	Kenya by 9 wickets

=== 2023 ICC Women's T20 World Cup Americas Qualifier ===
Pos	Team	Pld	W	L	NR	Pts	NRR
1	United States	6	6	0	0	12	2.674
2	Canada	6	4	2	0	8	1.508
3	Brazil	6	2	4	0	4	−0.903
4	Argentina	6	0	6	0	0	−3.170

Source: ESPNcricinfo

Round-robin
No.	Date	Team 1	Captain 1	Team 2	Captain 2	Venue	Result
WT20I 1603	4 September	United States	Sindhu Sriharsha	Argentina	Alison Stocks	Woodley Cricket Field, Los Angeles	United States by 79 runs
WT20I 1604	4 September	Brazil	Roberta Moretti Avery	Canada	Divya Saxena	Woodley Cricket Field, Los Angeles	Canada by 53 runs
WT20I 1615	5 September	United States	Sindhu Sriharsha	Brazil	Roberta Moretti Avery	Woodley Cricket Field, Los Angeles	United States by 39 runs
WT20I 1616	5 September	Argentina	Alison Stocks	Canada	Divya Saxena	Woodley Cricket Field, Los Angeles	Canada by 86 runs
WT20I 1634	7 September	United States	Sindhu Sriharsha	Canada	Divya Saxena	Woodley Cricket Field, Los Angeles	United States by 25 runs
WT20I 1635	7 September	Argentina	Alison Stocks	Brazil	Roberta Moretti Avery	Woodley Cricket Field, Los Angeles	Brazil by 78 runs
WT20I 1648	8 September	Brazil	Roberta Moretti Avery	Canada	Divya Saxena	Woodley Field, Los Angeles	Canada by 60 runs
WT20I 1649	8 September	United States	Sindhu Sriharsha	Argentina	Alison Stocks	Woodley Cricket Field, Los Angeles	United States by 72 runs
WT20I 1655	10 September	Argentina	Alison Stocks	Canada	Divya Saxena	Woodley Cricket Field, Los Angeles	Canada by 37 runs
WT20I 1656	10 September	United States	Sindhu Sriharsha	Brazil	Roberta Moretti Avery	Woodley Cricket Field, Los Angeles	United States by 10 wickets
WT20I 1659	11 September	Argentina	Alison Stocks	Brazil	Roberta Moretti Avery	Woodley Cricket Field, Los Angeles	Brazil by 9 wickets
WT20I 1660	11 September	United States	Sindhu Sriharsha	Canada	Divya Saxena	Woodley Cricket Field, Los Angeles	United States by 30 runs

=== 2023 Greece Women's Quadrangular Series ===
Pos	Team	Pld	W	L	NR	Pts	NRR
1	Greece	3	3	0	0	6	2.857
2	Luxembourg	3	2	1	0	4	1.703
3	Romania	3	1	2	0	2	−0.570
4	Serbia	3	0	3	0	0	−4.633

Source: ESPNcricinfo

Group stage
No.	Date	Team 1	Captain 1	Team 2	Captain 2	Venue	Result
WT20I 1609	5 September	Luxembourg	Kerry Fraser	Serbia	Magdalena Nikolic	Marina Ground, Gouvia	Luxembourg by 9 wickets
WT20I 1614	5 September	Greece	Sofia-nefeli Georgota	Romania	Rebecca Blake	Marina Ground, Gouvia	Greece by 8 wickets
WT20I 1622	6 September	Greece	Sofia-nefeli Georgota	Luxembourg	Kerry Fraser	Marina Ground, Gouvia	Greece by 17 runs (DLS)
WT20I 1629	7 September	Romania	Rebecca Blake	Serbia	Magdalena Nikolic	Marina Ground, Gouvia	Romania by 15 runs
WT20I 1631	7 September	Luxembourg	Kerry Fraser	Romania	Rebecca Blake	Marina Ground, Gouvia	Luxembourg by 8 wickets
WT20I 1632	7 September	Greece	Sofia-nefeli Georgota	Serbia	Magdalena Nikolic	Marina Ground, Gouvia	Greece by 10 wickets
Play-offs
No.	Date	Team 1	Captain 1	Team 2	Captain 2	Venue	Result
WT20I 1642	8 September	Greece	Sofia-nefeli Georgota	Serbia	Magdalena Nikolic	Marina Ground, Gouvia	Greece by 6 wickets
WT20I 1646	8 September	Luxembourg	Kerry Fraser	Romania	Rebecca Blake	Marina Ground, Gouvia	Romania by 7 runs
WT20I 1651	9 September	Luxembourg	Kerry Fraser	Serbia	Magdalena Nikolic	Marina Ground, Gouvia	Luxembourg by 63 runs
WT20I 1652	9 September	Greece	Sofia-nefeli Georgota	Romania	Rebecca Blake	Marina Ground, Gouvia	Greece by 9 wickets

=== 2023 ICC Women's T20 World Cup Europe Qualifier Division One ===
Pos	Team	Pld	W	L	NR	Pts	NRR
1	Scotland	6	5	1	0	10	3.777
2	Netherlands	6	5	1	0	10	2.377
3	Italy	6	2	4	0	4	−1.982
4	France	6	0	6	0	0	−4.566

Source: ESPNcricinfo

Round-robin
No.	Date	Team 1	Captain 1	Team 2	Captain 2	Venue	Result
WT20I 1620	6 September	France	Marie Violleau	Netherlands	Heather Siegers	Desert Springs Cricket Ground, Almería	Netherlands by 8 wickets
WT20I 1623	6 September	Italy	Kumudu Peddrick	Scotland	Abtaha Maqsood	Desert Springs Cricket Ground, Almería	Scotland by 9 wickets
WT20I 1630	7 September	Netherlands	Heather Siegers	Scotland	Kathryn Bryce	Desert Springs Cricket Ground, Almería	Netherlands by 35 runs
WT20I 1633	7 September	France	Marie Violleau	Italy	Kumudu Peddrick	Desert Springs Cricket Ground, Almería	Italy by 62 runs
WT20I 1644	8 September	Italy	Kumudu Peddrick	Netherlands	Heather Siegers	Desert Springs Cricket Ground, Almería	Netherlands by 9 wickets
WT20I 1647	8 September	France	Marie Violleau	Scotland	Kathryn Bryce	Desert Springs Cricket Ground, Almería	Scotland by 7 wickets
WT20I 1653	10 September	Italy	Kumudu Peddrick	Scotland	Kathryn Bryce	Desert Springs Cricket Ground, Almería	Scotland by 117 runs
WT20I 1654	10 September	France	Marie Violleau	Netherlands	Heather Siegers	Desert Springs Cricket Ground, Almería	Netherlands by 9 wickets
WT20I 1657	11 September	France	Marie Violleau	Italy	Kumudu Peddrick	Desert Springs Cricket Ground, Almería	Italy by 9 wickets
WT20I 1658	11 September	Netherlands	Heather Siegers	Scotland	Kathryn Bryce	Desert Springs Cricket Ground, Almería	Scotland by 59 runs
WT20I 1661	12 September	France	Marie Violleau	Scotland	Kathryn Bryce	Desert Springs Cricket Ground, Almería	Scotland by 155 runs
WT20I 1662	12 September	Italy	Kumudu Peddrick	Netherlands	Heather Siegers	Desert Springs Cricket Ground, Almería	Netherlands by 6 wickets

=== 2023 Men's Gulf T20I Championship ===
Pos	Team	Pld	W	L	NR	Pts	NRR
1	United Arab Emirates	5	4	1	0	8	1.592
2	Oman	5	3	2	0	6	1.110
3	Qatar	5	3	2	0	6	−0.503
4	Bahrain	5	3	2	0	6	−0.518
5	Kuwait	5	2	3	0	4	−0.391
6	Saudi Arabia	5	0	5	0	0	−1.292

Source: ESPNcricinfo

Round-robin
No.	Date	Team 1	Captain 1	Team 2	Captain 2	Venue	Result
T20I 2233	15 September	Kuwait	Mohammed Aslam	Saudi Arabia	Hisham Sheikh	West End Park International Cricket Stadium, Doha	Kuwait by 5 wickets
T20I 2234	15 September	Qatar	Muhammad Murad	Bahrain	Umer Toor	West End Park International Cricket Stadium, Doha	Qatar by 19 runs (DLS)
T20I 2235	16 September	Oman	Aqib Ilyas	United Arab Emirates	Muhammad Waseem	West End Park International Cricket Stadium, Doha	United Arab Emirates by 22 runs
T20I 2236	16 September	Bahrain	Umer Toor	Kuwait	Mohammed Aslam	West End Park International Cricket Stadium, Doha	Kuwait by 8 wickets
T20I 2237	17 September	Qatar	Muhammad Murad	Oman	Ayaan Khan	West End Park International Cricket Stadium, Doha	Oman by 19 runs
T20I 2238	17 September	Saudi Arabia	Hisham Sheikh	United Arab Emirates	Muhammad Waseem	West End Park International Cricket Stadium, Doha	United Arab Emirates by 8 wickets
T20I 2239	18 September	Qatar	Muhammad Murad	Kuwait	Mohammed Aslam	West End Park International Cricket Stadium, Doha	Qatar by 1 run
T20I 2240	18 September	Bahrain	Umer Toor	Saudi Arabia	Hisham Sheikh	West End Park International Cricket Stadium, Doha	Bahrain by 6 wickets
T20I 2242	19 September	Kuwait	Mohammed Aslam	United Arab Emirates	Muhammad Waseem	West End Park International Cricket Stadium, Doha	United Arab Emirates by 31 runs
T20I 2243	19 September	Bahrain	Umer Toor	Oman	Aqib Ilyas	West End Park International Cricket Stadium, Doha	Bahrain by 1 run
T20I 2245	20 September	Qatar	Muhammad Murad	United Arab Emirates	Muhammad Waseem	West End Park International Cricket Stadium, Doha	United Arab Emirates by 60 runs
T20I 2246	20 September	Oman	Aqib Ilyas	Saudi Arabia	Hisham Sheikh	West End Park International Cricket Stadium, Doha	Oman by 47 runs
T20I 2248	21 September	Qatar	Muhammad Murad	Saudi Arabia	Hisham Sheikh	West End Park International Cricket Stadium, Doha	Qatar by 7 wickets
T20I 2250	22 September	Bahrain	Umer Toor	United Arab Emirates	Muhammad Waseem	West End Park International Cricket Stadium, Doha	Bahrain by 3 runs
T20I 2251	22 September	Kuwait	Mohammed Aslam	Oman	Aqib Ilyas	West End Park International Cricket Stadium, Doha	Oman by 68 runs
Final
No.	Date	Team 1	Captain 1	Team 2	Captain 2	Venue	Result
T20I 2253	23 September	Oman	Aqib Ilyas	United Arab Emirates	Muhammad Waseem	West End Park International Cricket Stadium, Doha	Oman by 5 wickets

=== 2023 Malaysia Tri-Nation Series ===
Pos	Team	Pld	W	L	NR	Pts	NRR
1	Papua New Guinea	4	4	0	0	8	1.482
2	Malaysia	4	2	2	0	4	0.819
3	Hong Kong	4	0	4	0	0	−1.974

Source: ESPNcricinfo

T20I series
No.	Date	Team 1	Captain 1	Team 2	Captain 2	Venue	Result
T20I 2241	19 September	Malaysia	Ahmad Faiz	Hong Kong	Nizakat Khan	Bayuemas Oval, Pandamaran	Malaysia by 102 runs
T20I 2244	20 September	Malaysia	Ahmad Faiz	Papua New Guinea	Assad Vala	Bayuemas Oval, Pandamaran	Papua New Guinea by 45 runs (DLS)
T20I 2247	21 September	Hong Kong	Nizakat Khan	Papua New Guinea	Assad Vala	Bayuemas Oval, Pandamaran	Papua New Guinea by 22 runs
T20I 2249	22 September	Malaysia	Ahmad Faiz	Hong Kong	Nizakat Khan	Bayuemas Oval, Pandamaran	Malaysia by 23 runs
T20I 2252	23 September	Malaysia	Ahmad Faiz	Papua New Guinea	Assad Vala	Bayuemas Oval, Pandamaran	Papua New Guinea by 4 wickets
T20I 2254	24 September	Hong Kong	Nizakat Khan	Papua New Guinea	Assad Vala	Bayuemas Oval, Pandamaran	Papua New Guinea by 1 wicket

== See also ==
- International cricket in 2023
