= Valletta Cup =

- Countries: Malta
- Administrator: Malta Cricket Association
- Format: Twenty20 International, Women's Twenty20 International
- First edition: 2019
- Latest edition: 2024
- Current trophy holder: Isle of Man

The Valletta Cup is a recurring Twenty20 International cricket tournament for associate members of the International Cricket Council in Europe. It is organised by the Malta Cricket Association, with the format being round-robin matches followed by a final; all matches are played at the Marsa Sports Club in Marsa, Malta. The first edition was held in 2019.

== 2019 ==
The 2019 Valletta Cup was held between 17 and 20 October 2019. Four teams were involved: Malta, the Czech Republic, Iceland and a Hungary XI. Only matches played between Malta and the Czech Republic had official Twenty20 International (T20I) status. Czech Republic beat the Hungarian XI in the final.

== 2021 ==
The 2021 tournament was held between 21 and 24 October 2021. The four teams were Malta, Bulgaria, Gibraltar and Switzerland. Malta defeated Switzerland in the final, while Bulgaria defeated Gibraltar in the third-place playoff.

== 2022 ==
In 2022, the competition was expanded to six teams: Malta, Bulgaria, Czech Republic, Gibraltar, Hungary and Romania. It was held between 10 and 15 May 2022, and Romania defeated Malta in the final.

== 2023 ==
In 2023, the tournament was contested by Malta, France, Luxembourg, Romania and Switzerland between 12 and 16 July. Switzerland won all of their matches in the round-robin stage before defeating Malta in the final.

== 2024 ==
In 2024 the tournament was contested by women's teams for the first time. Malta, Greece, Isle of Man and Serbia were joined by a team from the MCC for the competition held between 21 and 24 August. MCC topped the group stages after winning all their matches but waived their place in the final which was instead contested by second place Isle of Man and third place Greece. Isle of Man won by seven wickets to claim the trophy.
