= Rebecca Blake =

English-Romanian cricketer (born 1998)

Personal information
- Full name: Rebecca Layla Blake
- Born: 13 November 1998 (age 27); Romania
- Batting: Right-handed
- Bowling: Right-arm offbreak

International information
- National sides: France (2011–c. 2016); Romania (2022–)
- T20I debut (cap 13): 9 September 2022; Romania v Greece
- Last T20I: 11 October 2025; Romania v Norway

Career statistics
| Competition | T20I |
|---|---|
| Matches | 17 |
| Runs scored | 1,027 |
| Batting average | 128.37 |
| 100s/50s | 3/7 |
| Top score | 135* |
| Balls bowled | 205 |
| Wickets | 8 |
| Bowling average | 25.12 |
| 5 wickets in innings | 0 |
| 10 wickets in match | 0 |
| Best bowling | 2/7 |
| Catches/stumpings | 7/0 |
- Source: Cricinfo, 23 June 2026

Rebecca Layla Blake (born 13 November 1998) is a Romanian cricketer and sport scientist who plays for the Romanian women's national cricket team as a right handed batter and offbreak bowler. She is presently the captain of the Romanian team, and has also captained the French national team.

On 9 September 2022, she captained Romania in her Twenty20 International (T20I) debut, against Greece. The following day, in a T20I against Serbia, she became the first woman to score a T20I century for Romania.

Off the field, she works as a laboratory technician at Solent University in Southampton, England, and as a sport scientist for the GB Speedway Team.

== Early life and education ==
Blake was born in Romania, to a Romanian mother, Greta, and an English father, John. She was raised in Romania, where she lived until she was nine years old, and in France. At the age of 11, she was introduced to cricket, in the form of an impromptu France v Rest of the World game at a picnic.

As a child, Blake also enjoyed horse riding, but had little time for it after starting high school. Additionally, she played basketball and handball with friends. However, she preferred cricket: "It is both a collective and individual discipline," she told Le Saumur Kiosque in 2014.

In her mid-teens, Blake lived in the tiny village of Miremont, between Thouars and Bressuire in the Deux-Sèvres department, western France, and attended Lycée Aliénor d'Aquitaine in Poitiers.

Between 2017 and 2020, she studied at Solent University in Southampton, England, for a Bachelor of Science with honours in Applied Sport Science. In 2021, she completed a Master of Science in Sport Science and Performance Coaching from the same university. She also has an England and Wales Cricket Board (ECB) Level 2 cricket coaching qualification and is qualified as a gym instructor.

In early 2022, she was said to be "in the process of organising a doctorate".

== Domestic career ==
Inspired by her introduction to cricket as an 11 year old, Blake joined the Saumur Cricket Club. She soon became the youngest and only girl player, and a regular, in the club's only team, which was otherwise a men's team. Later, she played for the Nantes Cricket Club.

In 2017, she moved to the Hursley Park Cricket Club in Hampshire, England, for which she played initially in the Women's 2nd XI, alongside Shami Mosweu, captain of the Botswana national team. In September 2019, she was a member of the Hursley Park team led by Emily Windsor that won the inaugural Summer Smash T10 tournament at The Oval in South London.

As of her international debut in September 2022, she was still a member of the Hursley Park club.

== International career ==
=== France ===
Blake's batting and bowling feats for Saumur soon came to the attention of the French national squad's selectors. In August 2011, aged 12, she played her first two matches for the French national team, against Jersey; the two contests were also the first matches ever played by the team, of which she was the youngest member. In the first match, Blake and the team did not do well, but in the second, she took two wickets and was given the best bowler award. Once again, she soon became a team regular.

By August 2014, when the then 15-year-old Blake played in that year's annual European women's cricket tournament at the Olympic Stadium in Berlin, she had become one of her team's vice-captains, and was being described as "the French teen star". The previous month, she had scored her maiden international half century, against Belgium.

At the tournament, contested by seven teams, Blake opened her account with 30* in France's defeat by host team Germany. In her final match, against Gibraltar, she contributed 31 runs to a "comfortable victory" by her team. France bagged a total of three 'upset' wins, against Jersey, Denmark and Gibraltar, and finished "an unexpected third", behind Italy and Germany. Along the way, Blake made 94 runs and took six wickets in six matches; she was also named as the tournament's leading Emerging Player, and was ranked sixth Most Valuable Player among more than 90 participants.

In an interview with The Deux-Sèvres Monthly published shortly after the tournament, Blake said:

"Quite simply, I'd like to be the best I can possibly be. I'd love to captain the French national side. My first ambition is to play at English county level with a view to someday playing for England if I'm good enough. Professional cricket is definitely something I'm looking into but for now I'm not sure what I want to do."

In 2016, Blake was appointed captain of the French team, replacing Sharon Whiting, who had retired. At that time, she was hailed as having "perfect knowledge of the game". In August 2016, aged seventeen and a half, she led France, and was "star de l'équipe" (transl. "star of the team"), in the annual European tournament, held in Herning, Denmark, against Belgium, Denmark, Germany, Italy and Norway. In five tournament matches, France went through undefeated, including against favourites Germany and Italy, and thus achieved "... the unthinkable by winning the gold medal".

When Blake moved to England in 2017, she ceased to be eligible for selection in the French team.

=== Romania ===
Blake was always eligible to play cricket for Romania, but for a long time that country had no women's team. Eventually, she was informed through Facebook that Cricket Romania was setting up such a team and wanted to discuss the team's plans with her. About a year later, she was playing cricket in Romania.

On 9 September 2022, Blake made her Twenty20 International (T20I) debut, as captain of the Romanian team against Greece, in the first match of the three team Women's Balkan Cup 2022 tournament at the Moara Vlasiei Cricket Ground, Ilfov County, Romania. Although she was top scorer for the match with 38 runs in 40 balls, Greece emerged as the victor, by eight wickets.

The following day, in a T20I against Serbia, Blake became the first woman to score a T20I century for Romania when she made 110* in 61 balls, with 17 fours, to lead the team to its first ever victory, by 145 runs. She was also named as player of the match. Romania was involved in two matches on the next day, 11 September 2022. In the first match, a playoff against Serbia for third place in the tournament, the team won by seven wickets, with Blake taking 2/7 and scoring 20*. In the second match, the tournament final, Blake made 49 in 34 balls, in Romania's defeat by Greece by 10 wickets.

As of the end of the tournament, Blake had played four T20Is, and had a batting average of 108.50 at a strike rate of 148.63. During an interview for a podcast in October 2022, she said that she was hoping to play more matches for Romania.

Between the 4th and the 6th of August 2023 she captained the Romanian team in the Women's Continental Cup held in Romania involving teams from the Isle of Man, Malta and Greece.

Blake became the fastest cricketer to score 1,000 runs in women's T20Is in the terms of innings (17), when she scored unbeaten 67 runs against Norway on 11 October 2025 in the 2025 Women's Continental Cup.

== Playing style ==
Blake is a right handed batter and offbreak bowler.

== Off the field ==
Blake is known to her friends and fellow cricketers as "Becky" or "Becks".

She has worked as a part-time cricket coach for Game Changers Coaching, a private coaching business, and for Sandroyd School in Wiltshire, England.

Since 2020, she has been a part time sport scientist for the GB Speedway Team. In that capacity, she monitors the progress, and assists with the development, of speedway riders; in particular, she collects, analyses and reports on telemetric data with the objective of maximising riders' performance.

In 2021–22, she was a full-time student hub advisor for the University of Southampton, England. In October 2022, she commenced working full time as a Laboratory Technician (Sport Science) at Solent University.

== See also ==
- List of centuries in women's Twenty20 International cricket
- List of Romania women Twenty20 International cricketers
