= Switzerland national cricket team =

Switzerland
- Association: Cricket Switzerland

Personnel
- Captain: Faheem Nazir
- Coach: Chris Lodge

International Cricket Council
- ICC status: Associate member (2021); Affiliate member (1985)
- ICC region: Europe
ICC Rankings	Current	Best-ever
T20I	49th	45th (1 May 2024)

International cricket
- First international: Switzerland v. Greece (Castel, Guernsey; 21 May 1990)

T20 Internationals
- First T20I: v Gibraltar at Marsa Sports Club, Marsa; 22 October 2021
- Last T20I: v Romania at Moara Vlasiei Cricket Ground, Moara Vlăsiei; 21 June 2026
T20Is	Played	Won/Lost
Total	44	24/18 (0 ties, 2 no results)
This year	9	4/5 (0 ties, 0 no results)
T20I kit
- As of 21 June 2026

The Switzerland national cricket team represents Switzerland in international cricket.

== History ==
Cricket has been played in Switzerland since at least 1817.

The association (renamed to Cricket Switzerland in 2014), became an affiliate member of the International Cricket Council in 1985. They hosted the first tournament for European affiliate members in Zuoz in 1997, the European Nations Cup, where they came fifth in the seven team tournament. They then played in the successor tournament, the European Cricket Council Trophy in 1999, 2001 and 2003, their best result coming in 1999 when they reached the semi-finals. They then played in the European Representative Championship in Slovenia in 2004, where they came third in the six team tournament.

They played in Division Four of the European Championship in 2009 having been promoted from Division Five, playing Austria, Cyprus, Finland, Luxembourg and Slovenia.

Switzerland was ranked to participate in ICC European Division II, Belgium 2011, but internal differences meant Switzerland were forced to withdraw from the tournament and hence was demoted to Division III.

These internal differences resulted from two rival governing bodies attempting to govern cricket in Switzerland, and this along with various breaches of membership regulations of the International Cricket Council led to Switzerland being expelled from the council.

With these governance issues resolved, an application to rejoin the ICC was submitted in October 2020. Switzerland were granted associate ICC Membership on 23 July 2021.

There are currently more than 30 clubs playing in Switzerland.

22 October 2021
10:00
Scorecard

Gibraltar; 133/9 (20 overs)	v	Switzerland; 134/1 (14.4 overs)
Louis Bruce 31 (27); Aidan Andrews 3/21 (4 overs)		Osama Mahmood 58* (46); Charles Harrison 1/19 (2 overs)

Switzerland won by 9 wickets
Marsa Sports Club, Marsa
Umpires: Tony Slater (Mlt) and Tim Wheeler (Mlt)
Player of the match: Osama Mahmood (Sui)

- Gibraltar won the toss and elected to bat.
- First ever T20I match for Switzerland.

== Tournament history ==
=== Valletta Cup ===
- 2019: Did not enter
- 2021: 2nd
- 2022: Did not enter
- 2023: Champions

== Current Squad ==
Last updated on 9 March 2026.

Name	Age	Batting style	Bowling style	Last T20I	Note(s)
Batters
Asad Mahmood	34	Right-handed	Right-arm offbreak	(Guernsey) 2025	
Grant Cupido	41	Right-handed	Right arm medium	(Guernsey) 2025	
Idrees Ul Haque	39	Right-handed	—N/a	(Estonia) 2025	
Jai Tiwari	19	Right-handed	Right arm medium	(Guernsey) 2025	
Numan Ahmadzai	21	Left-handed	Left arm medium	(Guernsey) 2025	
Qateel Zabiullah	23	Right-handed	Right arm medium	(Estonia) 2025	
All-rounders
Aneesh Kumar	42	Left-handed	Slow left-arm orthodox spin	(Estonia) 2025	
Harsha Deshan	32	Right-handed	Right arm medium	(Guernsey) 2025	Captain
Faheem Nazir	42	Left-handed	Right arm medium	(Guernsey) 2025	
Diyon Johnson	29	Left-handed	Right arm medium	(Guernsey) 2025	
Sheraz Sarwari	27	Right-handed	Right arm medium	(Luxembourg) 2025	
Malyar Stanikzai	25	Right-handed	Right arm medium	(Guernsey) 2025	
Isaac Stewart	18	Left-handed	Slow left-arm orthodox spin	(Guernsey) 2025	
Wicketkeeper batters
Ahmed Hassan	30	Left-handed	—N/a	(Guernsey) 2025	
Pace bowlers
Ashwin Vinod	28	Right-handed	Right arm medium-fast	(Estonia) 2025	
Hugo Elder	18	Right-handed	Right arm medium	(Luxembourg) 2025	
Kenardo Fletcher	36	Left-handed	Left arm medium-fast	(Estonia) 2025	
Jai Sinh	27	Right-handed	Right arm medium-fast	(Guernsey) 2025	
Spin Bowlers
Khalid Niazi	20	Right-handed	Right-arm offbreak	(Estonia) 2025	

== Records and statistics ==
International Match Summary — Switzerland

Last updated 21 June 2026

Playing Record
Format	M	W	L	T	NR	Inaugural Match
Twenty20 Internationals	44	24	18	0	2	22 October 2021

=== Twenty20 International ===
- Highest team total: 235/6 v. Estonia on 3 August 2025 at Estonian National Cricket and Rugby Field, Tallinn.
- Highest individual score: 113, Faheem Nazir v. Czech Republic on 20 July 2022 at Kerava National Cricket Ground, Kerava.
- Best individual bowling figures: 5/23, Jai Sinh v. Luxembourg on 31 July 2022 at Tikkurila Cricket Ground, Vantaa.

T20I record versus other nations

Records complete to T20I #3973. Last updated 21 June 2026.

Opponent	M	W	L	T	NR	First match	First win
vs Associate Members
Austria	4	1	3	0	0	30 May 2025	31 May 2025
Belgium	2	0	2	0	0	7 July 2024	
Bulgaria	1	1	0	0	0	22 October 2021	22 October 2021
Croatia	2	1	1	0	0	13 July 2024	13 July 2024
Cyprus	1	1	0	0	0	20 May 2026	20 May 2026
Czech Republic	1	0	1	0	0	30 July 2022	
Estonia	4	4	0	0	0	27 July 2022	27 July 2022
France	3	2	1	0	0	25 July 2022	25 July 2022
Gibraltar	1	1	0	0	0	22 October 2021	22 October 2021
Guernsey	3	0	1	0	2	30 August 2025	
Hungary	1	1	0	0	0	19 June 2026	19 June 2026
Jersey	2	0	2	0	0	9 July 2024	
Luxembourg	9	5	4	0	0	11 June 2022	11 June 2022
Malta	5	4	1	0	0	23 October 2021	23 October 2021
Norway	1	0	1	0	0	28 July 2022	
Romania	3	2	1	0	0	13 July 2023	13 July 2023
Serbia	1	1	0	0	0	11 July 2024	11 July 2024

== See also ==
- List of Switzerland Twenty20 International cricketers
