= Marsa Sports Club =

Cricket ground

Ground information
- Location: Marsa, Malta
- Country: Malta
- Coordinates: 35°52′32.6″N 14°29′15.5″E
- Establishment: 1902

International information
- First T20I: 18 October 2019: Malta v Czech Republic
- Last T20I: 5 February 2025: Austria v Hungary
- First WT20I: 17 August 2024: Malta v Isle of Man
- Last WT20I: 25 August 2024: Isle of Man v Greece
- As of 5 February 2025; Source: Cricinfo

The Marsa Sports Club is a sports ground in Marsa, Malta. Address: Sqaq ta' Ċeppuna, Marsa, MRS, Malta.

== History ==
Marsa Sports Club was inaugurated by the British Armed Forces in 1902. The membership to Maltese people was highly restricted until 1971. The ground was originally known as the United Services Sports Club.

The cricket stadium has a grass outfield and a matting wicket. It has hosted all matches for the three editions of the Valletta Cup.

== List of centuries ==
=== Twenty20 Internationals ===
No.	Score	Player	Team	Balls	Inns.	Opposing team	Date	Result
1	101	Sabawoon Davizi (1/2)	Czech Republic	68	1	Malta	20 October 2019	Won
2	115*	Sabawoon Davizi (2/2)	Czech Republic	59	1	Bulgaria	12 May 2022	Won
3	106	Dylan Steyn	Czech Republic	55	1	Bulgaria	12 May 2022	Won
4	115	Zeeshan Khan	Malta	64	1	Luxembourg	11 July 2023	Won

== See also ==
- Malta national cricket team
- Malta women's national cricket team
