= Isle of Man women's cricket team =

Cricket team

Isle of Man
- Flag of Isle of Man
- Association: Isle of Man Cricket Association

Personnel
- Captain: Alanya Thorpe
- Coach: Sally Green

International Cricket Council
- ICC status: Associate member (2017); Affiliate member (2004)
- ICC region: Europe
ICC Rankings	Current	Best-ever
T20I	37th	33rd (8 Sep 2023)

T20 Internationals
- First T20I: v Norway at Desert Springs Cricket Ground, Almería; 12 November 2022
- Last T20I: v Turkey at Moara Vlasei Cricket Ground, Ilfov County; 30 August 2026
T20Is	Played	Won/Lost
Total	39	23/16 (0 ties, 0 no results)
This year	4	3/1 (0 ties, 0 no results)
- As of 30 August 2026

The Isle of Man women's cricket team is a team which represents the Isle of Man in international cricket matches.

== History ==
In April 2018, the International Cricket Council (ICC) granted full Twenty20 International (T20I) status to all of its members. Therefore, all Twenty20 (T20) matches played between Isle of Man and other ICC members since 1 July 2018 have been eligible for full official international status.

The Isle of Man Cricket Association formed its first women's national team in November 2020. They played their inaugural WT20I against Norway at Desert Springs Cricket Ground in Almería, Spain, on 12 November 2022, successfully chasing a target of 47 in just 4.3 overs to win by 10 wickets. The match was part of the 2022 Spain Women's Pentangular Series also involving the host nation, Italy and Sweden. All-rounder Lucy Barnett made the first WT20I half-century by an Isle of Man player in the game against Italy, finishing with 64 from 64 balls in a losing effort as the team ended the competition in fourth place.

Isle of Man swept a three-match bilateral series with Austria in July 2023. The following month, they won the 2023 Women's T20 Continental Cup at Moara Vlasiei Cricket Ground in Romania. In an event also featuring Romania, Malta and Greece, the Isle of Man went unbeaten as they finished top of the group stage before defeating the Greeks by nine wickets in the final.

On 18 August 2024, Joanne Hicks became the first Isle of Man player to take a WT20I five-wicket haul when she claimed 5/10, including a hat-trick, against Malta in the second of a three-match bilateral series at Marsa Sports Club, Marsa, Malta. Later that month, the Isle of Man won the Valletta Cup, defeating Greece by seven wickets in the final of the tournament which also featured hosts Malta, Serbia and a team from the MCC.

In April 2025, Isle of Man were runners-up at the Cyprus WT20I Quadrangular Series, winning three of their six matches at the event which also included the hosts, Denmark and champions Jersey.

In May 2025, the team took part in a Women's T20 World Cup event for the first time at the 2025 Europe Qualifier Division Two in Rome. Having lost their opening fixture against hosts Italy, the Isle of Man claimed their first victory at this level in their second match against Sweden, successfully chasing a target of 123 in just 11.3 overs to win by seven wickets. They finished the event in sixth place with a record of one win and four losses.

In August 2026, the Isle of Man took part in the Women's T20 Continental Cup in Romania. In their second group match against Greece, Joanne Hicks, aged 51 years and 171 days old, took 5/10 to become the oldest cricketer, male or female, to claim a five-wicket haul in an international match. More history followed in their third group match against Norway when Lucy Barnett scored 123 not out, becoming the first Isle of Man player to make a WT20I century. Having won all three of their matches to finish top of their group, the team faced Turkey in the final, losing by five wickets.

== Records and statistics ==
International match summary — Isle of Man

Last updated 30 August 2026

Playing Record
Format	M	W	L	T	NR	Inaugural Match
Twenty20 Internationals	39	23	16	0	0	9 September 2022

=== Twenty20 International ===
- Highest team total: 267/3 v Serbia on 23 August 2024 at Marsa Sports Club, Marsa.
- Highest individual score: 123*, Lucy Barnett v Norway on 29 August 2026 at Moara Vlasei Cricket Ground, Ilfov County
- Best individual bowling figures: 5/10, Joanne Hicks v Malta on 18 August 2024 at Marsa Sports Club, Marsa, and v Greece on 27 August 2026 at Moara Vlasei Cricket Ground, Ilfov County.

T20I record against other nations

Records complete to WT20I #2984. Last updated 30 August 2026.

Matches against ICC associate members
Opponent	M	W	L	T	NR	First match	First win
Austria	3	3	0	0	0	30 July 2023	30 July 2023
Brazil	2	0	2	0	0	31 August 2025	
Cyprus	2	2	0	0	0	18 April 2025	18 April 2025
Denmark	2	1	1	0	0	18 April 2025	18 April 2025
Germany	1	0	1	0	0	29 May 2025	
Greece	5	5	0	0	0	4 August 2023	4 August 2023
Guernsey	3	0	3	0	0	5 May 2024	
Italy	2	0	2	0	0	13 November 2022	
Jersey	4	1	3	0	0	19 April 2025	2 September 2025
Malta	5	5	0	0	0	5 August 2023	5 August 2023
Norway	2	2	0	0	0	12 November 2022	12 November 2022
Romania	2	2	0	0	0	4 August 2023	4 August 2023
Serbia	1	1	0	0	0	23 August 2024	23 August 2024
Spain	2	0	2	0	0	12 November 2022	
Sweden	2	1	1	0	0	14 November 2022	26 May 2025
Turkey	1	0	1	0	0	30 August 2026	

== Tournament history ==
=== ICC Women's World Cup ===
World Cup record
Year	Round	Position	GP	W	L	T	NR
(England) 1973	Did not qualify/No women's ODI status						
(India) 1978	Did not qualify/No women's ODI status						
(New Zealand) 1982	Did not qualify/No women's ODI status						
(Australia) 1988	Did not qualify/No women's ODI status						
(England) 1993	Did not qualify/No women's ODI status						
(India) 1997	Did not qualify/No women's ODI status						
(New Zealand) 2000	Did not qualify/No women's ODI status						
(South Africa) 2005	Did not qualify/No women's ODI status						
(Australia) 2009	Did not qualify/No women's ODI status						
(India) 2013	Did not qualify/No women's ODI status						
(England) 2017	Did not qualify/No women's ODI status						
(New Zealand) 2022	Did not qualify/No women's ODI status						
(India) 2025	Did not qualify						
Total	0/12	0 Titles	0	0	0	0	0

=== ICC Women's World T20 ===
Twenty20 World Cup Record
Year	Round	Position	GP	W	L	T	NR
(England) 2009	Did not qualify						
(Cricket West Indies) 2010	Did not qualify						
(Sri Lanka) 2012	Did not qualify						
(Bangladesh) 2014	Did not qualify						
(India) 2016	Did not qualify						
(Cricket West Indies) 2018	Did not qualify						
(Australia) 2020	Did not qualify						
(South Africa) 2023	Did not qualify						
(United Arab Emirates) 2024	Did not qualify						
(England) 2026	Did not qualify						
Total	0/8	0 Titles	0	0	0	0	0

=== ICC Women's World Twenty20 Europe Qualifier ===
ICC Women's Twenty20 Qualifier Europe records
Year	Round	Position	GP	W	L	T	NR
(Spain) 2019	Did not participate						
(Spain) 2021	Did not participate						
(Jersey) 2023	Did not participate						
(Italy) 2025	DNQ	–	5	1	4	0	0
Total	1/4	0 Title	5	1	4	0	0

=== Women's European Cricket Championship ===
Women's European Cricket Championship records
Year	Round	Position	GP	W	L	T	NR
(Denmark) 1989	Did not participate						
(England) 1990	Did not participate						
(Netherlands) 1991	Did not participate						
(Republic of Ireland) 1995	Did not participate						
(Denmark) 1999	Did not participate						
(England) 2001	Did not participate						
(Wales) 2005	Did not participate						
(Netherlands) 2007	Did not participate						
(Republic of Ireland) 2009	Did not participate						
(Scotland) 2010	Did not participate						
(Netherlands) 2011	Did not participate						
(England) 2014	Did not participate						
Total	0/12	0 Title	0	0	0	0	0

=== Cricket at Summer Olympics Games ===
Cricket at Summer Olympics records
Host Year	Round	Position	GP	W	L	T	NR
(United States) 2028	To be determined						
(Australia) 2032	To be determined						
Total	–	0 Title	0	0	0	0	0

=== ICC Women's T20 Champions Trophy ===
ICC Women's T20 Champions Trophy records
Host Year	Round	Position	GP	W	L	T	NR
(Sri Lanka) 2027	To be determined						
2031	To be determined						
Total	–	0 Title	0	0	0	0	0

== See also ==
- List of Isle of Man women Twenty20 International cricketers
