= ICC Women's ODI and T20I Team Rankings =

International cricket ODI and T20I team rankings

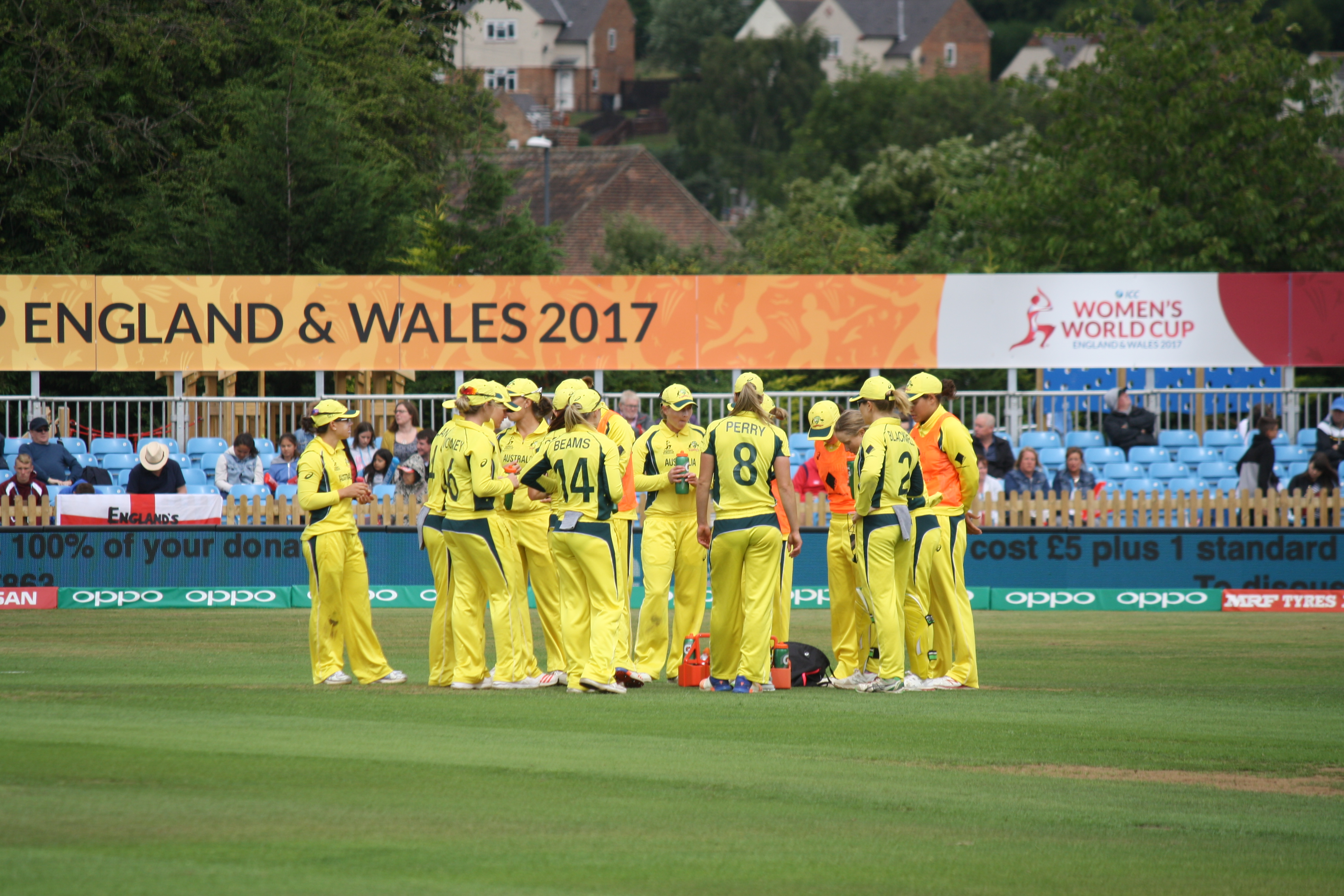
Australia women's national cricket team is currently the number 1 team in ODIs and T20Is

The ICC women's rankings were launched on 1 October 2015 covering all three formats of women's cricket. The ranking system gives equal weight to results of Test, ODI, and T20 matches. It was designed by statistician and ICC Cricket Committee member David Kendix and utilizes the same methodology as men's cricket rankings. Each team scores points based on the results of their matches over the last 3–4 years − all matches played in the 12–24 months since the first of October before last, plus all the matches played in the 24 months before that, for which the matches played and points earned both count half.

On 1 October of every year, the matches and points earned between 3 and 4 years ago are removed, and the matches and points earned between 1 and 2 years ago switch from 100% weighting to 50% weighting. For example, on 1 October 2014, the matches played between October 2010 and September 2011 were removed, and the matches played between October 2012 and September 2013 switched to 50% weighting.

In October 2018 following the ICC's decision to award T20 International status to all members, the Women's rankings were split into separate ODI (for Full Members & Associate Members with ODI status) and T20I lists.

== ODI rankings ==
ICC Women's ODI Team Rankings
Team	Matches	Points	Rating
Australia	31	5,085	164
England	29	3,653	126
India	33	4,114	125
South Africa	36	3,614	100
New Zealand	24	2,312	96
Sri Lanka	24	2,133	89
Pakistan	26	1,902	73
West Indies	29	2,085	72
Bangladesh	24	1,725	72
Ireland	25	1,120	45
Scotland	9	393	44
Netherlands	5	208	42
Thailand	7	248	35
Zimbabwe	25	349	14
United Arab Emirates	8	81	10
Papua New Guinea	12	37	3
Source: ICC Women's ODI Team Rankings, 28 October 2026

== T20I rankings ==
ICC Women's T20I Team Rankings
Team	Matches	Points	Rating
Australia	30	8,753	292
England	38	10,504	276
India	52	13,779	265
New Zealand	34	8,444	248
South Africa	43	10,588	246
Sri Lanka	51	12,198	239
West Indies	36	8,572	238
Pakistan	47	9,857	210
Ireland	48	9,726	203
Bangladesh	47	9,043	192
Scotland	44	7,415	169
Thailand	69	10,404	151
Netherlands	55	7,949	145
Papua New Guinea	36	5,008	139
United Arab Emirates	53	7,266	137
Zimbabwe	52	6,350	122
Uganda	61	6,878	113
Namibia	53	5,675	107
Tanzania	38	3,607	95
United States	35	3,316	95
Nepal	51	4,673	92
Indonesia	46	4,139	90
Hong Kong	63	5,634	89
Rwanda	65	5,779	89
Italy	31	2,603	84
Nigeria	36	2,689	75
Brazil	41	2,909	71
Malaysia	56	3,741	67
Vanuatu	27	1,762	65
Germany	33	2,130	65
Kenya	24	1,534	64
Jersey	27	1,639	61
Spain	15	867	58
Sweden	23	1,269	55
Oman	34	1,708	50
Cyprus	22	1,080	49
China	39	1,898	49
Isle of Man	24	1,137	47
Japan	34	1,529	45
Turkey	15	643	43
Switzerland	27	1,146	42
Canada	20	841	42
Myanmar	32	1,344	42
Denmark	29	1,194	41
Argentina	21	855	41
Costa Rica	7	267	38
Sierra Leone	26	989	38
Bhutan	21	771	37
France	10	349	35
Botswana	32	1,010	32
Gibraltar	12	378	32
Kuwait	27	842	31
Croatia	10	306	31
Samoa	16	472	30
Austria	30	816	27
Portugal	8	197	25
Guernsey	13	267	21
Norway	23	433	19
Malawi	31	556	18
Fiji	15	263	18
Serbia	19	291	15
Czech Republic	28	403	14
Greece	31	439	14
Estonia	21	283	13
Qatar	24	299	12
Finland	11	136	12
Romania	16	165	10
Mozambique	22	221	10
Malta	15	136	9
Cameroon	18	158	9
Luxembourg	19	157	8
Mexico	7	51	7
Bulgaria	27	114	4
Lesotho	17	50	3
Mongolia	20	42	2
Philippines	22	40	2
Singapore	29	11	0
Eswatini	10	0	0
Saudi Arabia	8	0	0
Cook Islands	12	0	0
Chile	7	0	0
Belgium	15	0	0
Bahrain	24	0	0
Source: ICC Women's T20I Team Rankings, 22 November 2026

== See also ==
- ICC Men's Test Team Rankings
- ICC Men's ODI Team Rankings
- ICC Men's T20I Team Rankings
- International cricket
