= Romania women's national cricket team =

Cricket team

Romania
- Flag of Romania
- Association: Cricket Romania

International Cricket Council
- ICC status: Associate member (2017); Affiliate member (2013)
- ICC region: Europe
ICC Rankings	Current	Best-ever
T20I	58th	50th (4 August 2023)

T20 Internationals
- First T20I: v. Malta at Moara Vlasiei Cricket Ground, Ilfov County; 27 August 2022
- Last T20I: v. Bulgaria at Moara Vlasei Cricket Ground, Ilfov County; 18 October 2026
T20Is	Played	Won/Lost
Total	27	9/18 (0 ties, 0 no results)
This year	7	1/6 (0 ties, 0 no results)
- As of 18 October 2026

The Romania national women's cricket team represents Romania in international women's cricket. In April 2018, the International Cricket Council (ICC) granted full Women's Twenty20 International (WT20I) status to all its members. Therefore, all Twenty20 matches that have been played between Romania women and other ICC members after 1 July 2018 have the full WT20I status.

== Records and statistics ==
International Match Summary — Romania Women

Last updated 18 October 2026

Playing Record
Format	M	W	L	T	NR	Inaugural Match
Twenty20 Internationals	27	9	18	0	0	27 August 2022

=== Twenty20 International ===
- Highest team total: 198/1 v Bulgaria on 10 October 2025 at Moara Vlasiei Cricket Ground, Ilfov County, Romania.
- Highest individual score: 135*, Rebecca Blake v Malta on 5 August 2023 at Moara Vlasiei Cricket Ground, Ilfov County, Romania.
- Best individual bowling figures: 5/9, Elena Predescu v Serbia on 22 September 2022 at Moara Vlasiei Cricket Ground, Ilfov County, Romania.

T20I record versus other nations

Records complete to WT20I #3041. Last updated 18 October 2026.

Opponent	M	W	L	T	NR	First match	First win
ICC Associate members
Austria	2	1	1	0	0	9 October 2025	9 October 2025
Bulgaria	3	1	2	0	0	10 October 2025	10 October 2025
Greece	6	1	5	0	0	9 September 2022	28 August 2026
Isle of Man	2	0	2	0	0	4 August 2023	
Luxembourg	2	1	1	0	0	7 September 2023	8 September 2023
Malta	5	1	4	0	0	27 August 2022	5 August 2023
Norway	2	1	1	0	0	11 October 2025	11 October 2025
Serbia	3	3	0	0	0	10 September 2022	10 September 2022
Sweden	1	0	1	0	0	17 October 2026	
Turkey	1	0	1	0	0	10 October 2025	

== See also ==
- List of Romania women Twenty20 International cricketers
