= Malta national cricket team =

Malta
- Association: Malta Cricket Association

Personnel
- Captain: Mehboob Ali
- Coach: Subhas Roy

International Cricket Council
- ICC status: Associate member (2017)
- ICC region: Europe
ICC Rankings	Current	Best-ever
T20I	65th	51st (8 July 2021)

International cricket
- First international: v England at the Naval Ground, Malta; 9 October 1891

T20 Internationals
- First T20I: v Spain at La Manga Club, Cartagena; 29 March 2019
- Last T20I: v Switzerland at Happy Valley Ground 2, Episkopi; 23 May 2026
T20Is	Played	Won/Lost
Total	94	38/53 (2 ties, 1 no result)
This year	11	7/3 (1 tie, 0 no results)
T20I kit
- As of 23 May 2026

The Malta national cricket team represents the Republic of Malta in international cricket. The team is organised by the Malta Cricket Association, which became an affiliate member of the International Cricket Council (ICC) in 1998. and an associate member in 2017. A Maltese national team first played as early as 1891, when an XVIII of Malta played an English team on its way to a tour of Australia. The team was not revived until 1990, when it participated in the European Cricketer Cup in Guernsey. Since then, Malta has appeared regularly in European Cricket Council tournaments, generally in the lower divisions.

== History ==
=== 2018-Present ===
In April 2018, the ICC decided to grant full Twenty20 International (T20I) status to all its members. Therefore, all Twenty20 matches played between Malta and other ICC members after 1 January 2019 will be a full T20I.

Malta played its first official T20I against, Spain, on 29 March 2019 during the 2019 Spain Triangular T20I Series. The match was played at La Manga Club, Murcia, Spain.

29 March 2019
15:30
Scorecard

Malta; 98/9 (20 overs)	v	Spain; 99/3 (12.1 overs)
Bikram Arora 28 (25); Tom Vine 4/28 (4 overs)		Yasir Ali 57 (40); Jurg Hirschi 1/15 (2 overs)

Spain won by 7 wickets
La Manga Club, Murcia
Umpires: Adnan Khan (Esp) and Harmit Phull (Esp)

- Malta won the toss and elected to bat.
- First ever T20I match for Malta.

== International competition ==
Malta competed in every edition of the European Affiliates Championship from 1999 to 2005, their best result coming in 2001 when they reached the semi-finals. They competed in the tournament predecessor, the European Nations Cup in 1997, and competed in its successor, Division Three of the European Championship in 2007, 2009, 2011 and 2012.

In October 2013, Malta hosted an International Tournament, inviting the International Cricket Associations of the Czech Republic, Hungary and Russia. Malta played their games from 4 to 6 October. Khosla captained the side to 3 wins out of 3, culminating in a final day victory over Hungary where the latter could've also won the tournament with a victory. The winning runs were scored on a wide delivery with Haroon Majeed facing the ball.

Malta followed up their success with a second successive International Tournament victory in Budapest, Hungary. Malta defeated the UAE in the final in a tournament compromising of Hungary, Poland, Austria, Czech Republic, UAE and Malta. Bikram Arora hit the winning runs with a drive to the leg-side which made it to the boundary. Malta's Christopher Chellew won the Player of the Tournament and also scored the most runs in tournament.

Malta competed in a third International Tournament along with Sweden, Poland and Czech Republic, hosted by the latter in Prague. Malta had their 7 match unbeaten run ended by Sweden, when Malta fell 5 runs short of the Swedes' first innings target of 198 runs. Heavy rain and poor weather conditions all round caused Malta's game with Czech Republic to first be suspended and then abandoned in the 2nd innings after Malta were bowled out for 122. Malta got their first and only win of the tournament by successfully chasing 140 runs against Poland, who had already wrapped up the Tournament for themselves the previous day. This left Malta third in the table, level on points on Sweden but behind them on net run rate.

In September of the same year, Malta hosted Hungary in a 3-match series. The first two games were T20s with the first game being a decisive Malta victory while the second saw Hungary become the first National Cricket Team to win in Malta. The final game was a 50-Over Match. Hungary batted first and were bowled out for 121 runs. Chellew scored a half-century to inspire Malta to victory and a series win.

== Domestic cricket ==
Malta boasts a climate that enables cricket to be played all year round and encourages visiting teams to come and play on the island. There are two grounds: Marsa Cricket Ground, in existence for over a century and Hal Safi Cricket Ground, which is rarely used. Twelve clubs contested the T20 2020 Summer League: Knight Kings, Super Kings, Southern Crusaders, Power Hitters, Swieqi United, Bugibba Blasters, Marsa, Msida Warriors, Overseas, American University of Malta, Paola Boys and Mater Dei. The 2019–20 Winter League took the form of a 50-overs Marsa Federations Cup, featuring five regional teams: Birkirkara Blues, Mellieha Stars, Rabat Titans, Sliema Riders and Valletta Vikings.

== Grounds ==
Locations of grounds which have hosted international cricket matches within Malta

== Current squad ==
This lists all the players who have played for Malta in the past 12 months or has been part of the latest T20I squad. Uncapped players are listed in italics.

Name	Age	Batting style	Bowling style	Notes
Batters
Zeeshan Khan	37	Right-handed	Right-arm leg break	
Samuel Stanislaus	45	Right-handed	Right-arm off break	
Basil George	28	Right-handed	Right-arm medium	
Jaspal Singh	40	Right-handed	Right-arm medium	
Darshit Patankar	28	Right-handed		
Gopal Thakur	32	Right-handed	Right-arm medium	
All-rounders
Varun Thamotharan	37	Left-handed	Left-arm medium-fast	Captain
Alex Hudson	20	Left-handed	Right-arm medium	
Bikram Arora	43	Right-handed	Right-arm leg break	Vice-captain
Fanyan Mughal	40	Right-handed	Left-arm medium	
Imran Ameer	38	Right-handed	Right-arm off break	
Priyan Pushparajan	35	Right-handed	Right-arm medium	
Indika Perera	44	Right-handed	Right-arm medium	
Wicket-keepers
Aaftab Alam Khan	40	Right-handed		
Chanjal Sudarsanan	32	Right-handed		
John Grima	67	Right-handed		
Spin Bowler
Amar Sharma	48	Right-handed	Right-arm off break	
Pace Bowlers
Waseem Abbas	36	Right-handed	Right-arm fast	
Waqas Ahmad	31	Right-handed	Right-arm medium	
Eldhose Mathew	32	Right-handed	Right-arm medium	
Jaswinder Singh	34	Right-handed	Right-arm medium	
Muhammad Ajmal	55	Left-handed	Left-arm medium	

Updated as on 20 August 2023

== Records and statistics ==
International Match Summary — Malta

Last updated 23 May 2026

Playing Record
Format	M	W	L	T	NR	Inaugural Match
Twenty20 Internationals	94	38	53	2	1	29 March 2019

=== Twenty20 International ===
- Highest team total: 231/4 v. Gibraltar, 7 May 2026 at Marsa Sports Club, Marsa.
- Highest individual score: 115, Zeeshan Khan v. Luxembourg, 11 July 2023 at Marsa Sports Club, Malta.
- Best individual bowling figures: 5/11, Waqas Ahmad v. France, 16 July 2023 at Marsa Sports Club, Malta.

Most T20I runs for Malta

Player	Runs	Average	Career span
Varun Thamotharam	1,445	26.27	2020–2025
Zeeshan Khan	1,086	23.10	2020–2026
Bikram Arora	826	19.66	2019–2024
Jaspal Singh	728	21.48	2023–2026
Basil George	724	22.62	2021–2024

Most T20I wickets for Malta

Player	Wickets	Average	Career span
Waseem Abbas	75	22.52	2019–2025
Varun Thamotharam	44	28.34	2020–2025
Bilal Muhammad	40	19.65	2021–2022
Amar Sharma	31	35.70	2020–2025
Imran Amir	30	25.00	2022–2026

T20I record versus other nations

Records complete to T20I #3899. Last updated 23 May 2026.

Opponent	M	W	L	T	NR	First match	First win
vs Associate Members
Austria	4	1	3	0	0	3 February 2025	29 June 2025
Belgium	13	2	11	0	0	8 July 2021	8 July 2021
Bulgaria	7	6	0	0	1	23 September 2020	23 September 2020
Cyprus	1	0	1	0	0	28 August 2024	
Czech Republic	3	1	2	0	0	18 October 2019	12 May 2022
Estonia	4	2	2	0	0	27 August 2024	6 May 2025
Finland	1	0	1	0	0	21 August 2024	
France	7	3	4	0	0	10 July 2023	10 July 2023
Gibraltar	15	11	2	2	0	20 August 2021	20 August 2021
Guernsey	2	0	2	0	0	22 August 2024	
Hungary	4	1	3	0	0	5 September 2021	10 May 2022
Israel	1	1	0	0	0	1 July 2022	1 July 2022
Luxembourg	4	2	2	0	0	2 September 2021	11 July 2023
Portugal	8	0	8	0	0	19 August 2021	
Romania	10	5	5	0	0	4 September 2021	11 May 2022
Slovenia	1	1	0	0	0	22 May 2026	22 May 2026
Spain	3	0	3	0	0	29 March 2019	
Sweden	1	1	0	0	0	20 May 2026	20 May 2026
Switzerland	5	1	4	0	0	23 October 2021	24 October 2021

== See also ==
- List of Malta Twenty20 International cricketers
