= Serbia women's national cricket team =

Cricket team

Serbia
- Flag of Serbia
- Association: Serbian Cricket Federation

International Cricket Council
- ICC status: Associate member (2017); Affiliate member (2015)
- ICC region: Europe
ICC Rankings	Current	Best-ever
T20I	60th	62nd (1 May 2024)

T20 Internationals
- First T20I: v. Greece at Moara Vlasiei Cricket Ground, Ilfov County; 10 September 2022
- Last T20I: v. Bulgaria at Lisicji Jarak Cricket Ground, Belgrade; 6 September 2026
T20Is	Played	Won/Lost
Total	29	11/18 (0 ties, 0 no results)
This year	8	5/3 (0 ties, 0 no results)
- As of 6 September 2026

The Serbia national women's cricket team represents Serbia in international women's cricket. In April 2018, the International Cricket Council (ICC) granted full Women's Twenty20 International (WT20I) status to all its members. Therefore, all Twenty20 played between Serbia women and other ICC members after 1 July 2018 have WT20I status.

== Records and statistics ==
International Match Summary — Serbia Women

Last updated 6 September 2026

Playing Record
Format	M	W	L	T	NR	Inaugural Match
Twenty20 Internationals	29	11	18	0	0	10 September 2022

=== Twenty20 International ===
T20I record versus other nations

Records complete to WT20I #3006. Last updated 6 September 2026.

Opponent	M	W	L	T	NR	First match	First win
ICC Associate members
Bulgaria	12	11	1	0	0	12 October 2024	12 October 2024
Croatia	2	0	2	0	0	4 September 2026	
Cyprus	2	0	2	0	0	14 September 2024	
Greece	5	0	5	0	0	10 September 2022	
Isle of Man	1	0	1	0	0	23 August 2024	
Luxembourg	2	0	2	0	0	5 September 2023	
Malta	1	0	1	0	0	24 August 2024	
Romania	3	0	3	0	0	10 September 2022	
Turkey	1	0	1	0	0	7 July 2025	

== See also ==
- List of Serbia women Twenty20 International cricketers
