= Malta women's national cricket team =

Cricket team

Malta
- Flag of Malta
- Association: Malta Cricket Association

International Cricket Council
- ICC status: Associate member (2017); Affiliate member (1998)
- ICC region: Europe
ICC Rankings	Current	Best-ever
T20I	62nd	44th (8 Sep 2023)

T20 Internationals
- First T20I: v. Romania at Moara Vlasiei Cricket Ground, Ilfov County; 27 August 2022
- Last T20I: v. Cyprus at Happy Valley Ground, Episkopi; 20 June 2026
T20Is	Played	Won/Lost
Total	25	7/18 (0 ties, 0 no results)
This year	5	0/5 (0 ties, 0 no results)
- As of 20 June 2026

The Malta national women's cricket team is the team that represents Malta in international women's cricket. In April 2018, the International Cricket Council (ICC) granted full Women's Twenty20 International (WT20I) status to all its members. Therefore, all Twenty20 matches to be played between Malta women and other ICC members after 1 July 2018 have been eligible for full WT20I status.

== Records and statistics ==
International Match Summary — Malta Women

Last updated 20 June 2026

Playing Record
Format	M	W	L	T	NR	Inaugural Match
Twenty20 Internationals	24	7	17	0	0	27 August 2022

=== Twenty20 International ===
- Highest team total: 162/1 v. Romania on 5 August 2023 at Moara Vlasiei Cricket Ground, Ilfov County, Romania.
- Highest individual score: 51*, Jessica Rymer v. Romania on 5 August 2023 at Moara Vlasiei Cricket Ground, Ilfov County, Romania.
- Best individual bowling figures: 4/9, Shamla Cholasseri v. Romania on 6 August 2023 at Moara Vlasiei Cricket Ground, Ilfov County, Romania.

T20I record versus other nations

Records complete to WT20I #2876. Last updated 20 June 2026.

Opponent	M	W	L	T	NR	First match	First win
ICC Associate members
Croatia	2	2	0	0	0	5 May 2025	5 May 2025
Cyprus	5	0	5	0	0	18 June 2026	
Greece	2	0	2	0	0	4 August 2023	
Isle of Man	5	0	5	0	0	5 August 2023	
Italy	2	0	2	0	0	26 September 2024	
Romania	5	4	1	0	0	27 August 2022	27 August 2022
Serbia	1	1	0	0	0	24 August 2024	24 August 2024
Sweden	3	0	3	0	0	26 September 2024	

== See also ==
- List of Malta women Twenty20 International cricketers
