= Moara Vlasiei Cricket Ground =

Cricket ground

- Interactive map of Moara Vlasiei Cricket Ground

Ground information
- Location: Moara Vlăsiei, Ilfov County, Romania
- Country: Romania
- Coordinates: 44.6480°N 26.2163°E

International information
- First men's T20I: 29 August 2019: Romania v Austria
- Last men's T20I: 24 May 2024: Romania v Bulgaria
- First women's T20I: 27 August 2022: Romania v Malta
- Last women's T20I: 6 August 2023: Greece v Isle of Man
- As of 24 May 2024; Source: ESPNcricinfo

The Moara Vlasiei Cricket Ground is a cricket ground in Moara Vlăsiei, Ilfov County, Romania. The venue, started in 2011 and completed in 2013, is the only turf ground in Romania. It hosted the 2019 Continental Cup, a five-team Twenty20 International (T20I) cricket tournament. In 2026, the ground hosted a Women’s Continental Cup 2026 featuring eight teams.

== List of centuries ==
=== Twenty20 Internationals ===
No.	Score	Player	Team	Balls	Inns.	Opposing team	Date	Result
1	105*	Sivakumar Periyalwar	Romania	40	1	Turkey	29 August 2019	Won
2	104*	Sudesh Wickramasekara	Czech Republic	36	1	Turkey	30 August 2019	Won
3	111*	Bilal Zalmai	Austria	58	1	Czech Republic	1 September 2019	Won

== List of five-wicket hauls ==
=== Twenty20 Internationals ===
No.	Bowler	Date	Team	Opposing team	Inn	Overs	Runs	Wkts	Econ	Result
1	Ankush Nanda	29 August 2019	Luxembourg	Turkey	1	2.3	6	5	2.40	Won

== See also ==
- Romania national cricket team
- Romania women's national cricket team
