= Greece women's national cricket team =

Cricket team

Greece
- Flag of Greece
- Association: Hellenic Cricket Federation

International Cricket Council
- ICC status: Associate member (2017); Affiliate member (1995)
- ICC region: Europe
ICC Rankings	Current	Best-ever
T20I	50th	31st (8 Sep 2023)

T20 Internationals
- First T20I: v. Romania at Moara Vlasiei Cricket Ground, Ilfov County; 9 September 2022
- Last T20I: v. Norway at Moara Vlasei Cricket Ground, Ilfov County; 29 August 2026
T20Is	Played	Won/Lost
Total	46	20/24 (0 ties, 2 no results)
This year	13	2/10 (0 ties, 1 no result)
- As of 29 August 2026

The Greece national women's cricket team represents Greece in international women's cricket. In April 2018, the International Cricket Council (ICC) granted full Women's Twenty20 International (WT20I) status to all its members. Therefore, all Twenty20 matches played between Greece women and other ICC members after 1 July 2018 have the WT20I status.

== Records and statistics ==
International Match Summary — Greece Women

Last updated 29 August 2026

Playing Record
Format	M	W	L	T	NR	Inaugural Match
Twenty20 Internationals	46	20	24	0	2	9 September 2022

=== Twenty20 International ===
- Highest team total: 154/4 v Romania on 5 August 2023 at Moara Vlasiei Cricket Ground, Ilfov County, Romania.
- Highest individual score: 56, Maria Syrioti v Romania on 5 August 2023 at Moara Vlasiei Cricket Ground, Ilfov County, Romania.
- Best individual bowling figures: 6/5, Aggeliki Savvani v Romania on 5 August 2023 at Moara Vlasiei Cricket Ground, Ilfov County, Romania.

T20I record versus other nations

Records complete to WT20I #2977. Last updated 29 August 2026.

Opponent	M	W	L	T	NR	First match	First win
ICC Associate members
Bulgaria	5	5	0	0	0	26 October 2024	26 October 2024
Cyprus	6	1	4	0	1	3 April 2026	5 April 2026
Denmark	4	1	3	0	0	9 May 2026	9 May 2026
Germany	4	0	4	0	0	10 May 2025	
Isle of Man	5	0	5	0	0	4 August 2023	
Luxembourg	1	1	0	0	0	6 September 2023	6 September 2023
Malta	2	2	0	0	0	4 August 2023	4 August 2023
Norway	1	0	1	0	0	29 August 2026	
Romania	6	5	1	0	0	9 September 2022	9 September 2022
Serbia	5	4	0	0	0	10 September 2022	10 September 2022
Spain	4	0	4	0	1	20 September 2024	
Turkey	2	0	2	0	0	7 July 2025	

== See also ==
- Greece national cricket team
- List of Greece women Twenty20 International cricketers
