= Kathryn Bryce =

Scottish cricketer (born 1997)

Personal information
- Full name: Kathryn Emma Bryce
- Born: 17 November 1997 (age 29); Edinburgh, Scotland
- Batting: Right-handed
- Bowling: Right-arm medium
- Role: All-rounder
- Relatives: Sarah Bryce (sister)

International information
- National side: Scotland
- ODI debut (cap 19): 17 October 2023 v Ireland
- Last ODI: 18 April 2025 v Ireland
- T20I debut (cap 2): 7 July 2018 v Uganda
- Last T20I: 13 October 2024 v England
- T20I shirt no.: 17

Domestic team information
- Years: Team
- 2011–present: Scotland
- 2017–2019: Warwickshire
- 2017–2019: Scotland A
- 2019: Loughborough Lightning
- 2020–present: The Blaze
- 2021: Lincolnshire
- 2021–2022: Trent Rockets
- 2022–present: Derbyshire
- 2023–present: Manchester Originals
- 2024–present: Gujarat Giants

Career statistics
Competition	WODI	WT20I	WLA	WT20
Matches	10	49	102	210
Runs scored	594	1,273	2,990	3,971
Batting average	66.00	37.44	35.17	31.02
100s/50s	1/6	0/10	5/20	0/29
Top score	131*	73*	162	79*
Balls bowled	360	949	4,028	3,405
Wickets	11	48	112	176
Bowling average	26.72	15.14	24.09	18.89
5 wickets in innings	0	0	2	1
10 wickets in match	0	0	0	0
Best bowling	3/49	4/8	5/29	5/13
Catches/stumpings	2/–	27/–	45/–	74/–
- Source: CricketArchive, 24 November 2025

Kathryn Emma Bryce (born 17 November 1997) is a Scottish cricketer and the current captain of the national women's cricket team. An all-rounder, she plays at the domestic level for the Watsonian cricket club, and for English teams The Blaze (formerly known as Lightning) and Derbyshire; she has also been drafted by Manchester Originals. Previously, she has taken the field for English teams Warwickshire, Loughborough Lightning, Lincolnshire and Trent Rockets. She also plays for the Warriors team in FairBreak Invitational T20 tournaments.

In December 2020, Bryce was named the ICC Associate Cricketer of the Decade. In June 2021, she became the first cricketer for Scotland, male or female, to make it into the top ten of the ICC Player Rankings. Her younger sister, Sarah, also plays international cricket for Scotland.

== Early life, family and education ==
Bryce was born in Edinburgh, into a cricket-loving family, and, together with her sister Sarah, developed an enthusiasm for all sports at an early age. "We played pretty much every sport growing up, throwing every sort of ball around in the garden," she told Cricinfo in 2021.

Bryce's earliest memory of watching cricket is watching the 2005 Men's Ashes series, during which the whole of her family would gather in front of the television, while Bryce and her sister would play cricket. As well as playing "a lot of hockey and tennis", Bryce joined a girls' cricket team at her school, George Watson's College. At the age of nine, she received a standard form letter from former Scotland international player Liz Smith, who was setting up the girls' team; after signing up immediately, she went through her first-ever experience of organised cricket training. Bryce does not know whether she would have taken up cricket if there had not been a girls' team at her school, and is thankful to Smith for introducing her to the game.

At that time, Edinburgh had no other girls' school teams, and so Bryce's school played against many University teams, made up of similarly inexperienced players. In 2015 and again in 2016, the girls' first XI team, with Bryce as a member, won the senior-level Women's Scottish Cup tournament.

Bryce's cricketing talent was evident from early on; she was later the first girl to take the field for the school's boys first XI. She also joined Watsonian cricket club: "... I was playing for the girls' first XI, basically as a fielder but having a great time." In 2019, she told The Scotsman:

"I grew up playing with boys but you do learn a lot from that, because they hit the ball a lot harder, etc. But if we had more women’s teams, that would help the overall standard improve.

A lot of girls don't enjoy playing with men when they're younger. It can be intimidating. You lose people from the sport and the best thing is to keep girls involved for longer."

Bryce left school in 2015, and has since been included in the school's sporting Wall of Fame. Becoming a full-time professional cricketer in Scotland was not an option for her. In 2017, after taking a gap year, she therefore moved to Loughborough University in Leicestershire, England. At Loughborough, where she studied Sport and Exercise Science, she was able to improve her cricket full-time in a high-performance programme, although she was only an unpaid student, and participating only during the academic year. She credits the university for supporting her in balancing her studies with playing sport at a high level.

Bryce's sister later joined her at Loughborough University. The two sisters have also usually played cricket for the same team. Bryce has described their relationship as 'probably quite unique'. She has also said:

"Most sisters probably aren't at the same uni, doing the same sport. I think to be able to share it with someone so close is special.

You might be feeling down and don't want to show it to the group. But Sarah knows me really well and [it takes her] just one little sentence to realise, and then get you back on track."

At Scotland, Bryce has been team captain since April 2018, and her sister is her deputy. However, the two sisters have sometimes played for opposing teams, both in English domestic competitions, and in FairBreak Invitational T20 tournaments.

Bryce finished her sport science degree in June 2021. By then, there was sufficient professionalism in women's cricket for her to be able to make a living as a Scottish international cricketer, without having to have another job as well.

== Domestic career ==
=== Scotland ===
In 2017, after leaving school, Bryce won the third of a hat-trick of Women's Scottish Cup winner's medals with the GWC girls' 1st XI team. She has also played women's club cricket for the Watsonian club for many years. As she has explained to the Edinburgh Evening News, she appears for the club when around and available to play; she continued:

"It is a shame that the Scotland girls cannot play more club cricket on Saturdays, but often they are travelling down south at weekends to play English counties with the national team.

I think it would help some of the girls to continue to learn and improve if they were exposed to more club cricket."

In July 2019, Bryce played and enjoyed her first match for Watsonians men's first XI, when she took the field in an CSL Eastern Premier Division clash with Stoneywood-Dyce at Myreside. She had previously turned out for the men's second XI. Although she scored 25 runs and took a wicket in her maiden first XI match, Watsonians were defeated by six wickets.

=== England: County cricket ===
Bryce's first taste of county cricket was as a very young player for the Scotland team, which participated in the Women's County Championship.

In 2015, Bryce played only three matches in that year's Women's County Championship, in which Scotland finished last in Division 2 and was relegated to Division 3. In the 2015 Women's Twenty20 Cup, by contrast, she played in all eight of Scotland's matches. In five innings, she was dismissed only once, and made an aggregate of 141 runs at an average of 141.00, with a top score of 53 against Buckinghamshire; she also took a total of 8/130, with a best performance of 3/11 against Oxfordshire.

In the 2016 Women's County Championship, Bryce played in all eight of Scotland's matches, and recorded the sixth-highest aggregate in Division 3, with 184 runs at 36.80, including a top score of 73*. In the 2016 Women's Twenty20 Cup, she similarly played in all eight of Scotland's matches, and took an aggregate of 8/79, including 4/5 against Devon, as the team went undefeated to win Division 3 and achieve promotion to Division 2.

In 2017, when Bryce first relocated to England to attend Loughborough University, Warwickshire's Division One county team captain Marie Kelly was also a student there. Bryce joined Kelly at Warwickshire for three seasons.

During the 2017 Women's County Championship, Bryce opened the batting for Warwickshire with Amy Jones, which she felt really helped her game. She scored 241 runs at 30.13 including a half-century against Nottinghamshire, as Warwickshire powered its way to third place in Division One. In the T20 Cup Division 1, her best performance for Warwickshire was a 49-ball 73* against Surrey. She also played four T20 Cup Division 2 matches for Scotland A, scoring a total of 114 runs with a top score of 50*.

In 2018, Bryce again played for Scotland A in the Women's Twenty20 Cup Division 2. In eight Division 2 matches, she scored 202 runs at 40.40, with a top score of 41*.

The Women's County Championship was last held in 2019. That year, Bryce yet again played for Scotland A in the Women's Twenty20 Cup Division 2, and she made fewer than 100 runs in six matches. The next season, 2020, the Women's Twenty20 Cup was not held, due to the COVID-19 pandemic. Ahead of the following season, 2021, Bryce joined Lincolnshire. In six matches in the East Midlands Group of that season's Women's Twenty20 Cup, she scored an aggregate of 141 runs for her new County team, including the highest individual score in the Group's matches, 65* against Leicestershire; additionally, she recorded the Group's best individual bowling performance, of 4/8, also against Leicestershire.

Bryce then moved to Derbyshire for 2022. In four matches for the county in Group 1 of that season's Women's Twenty20 Cup, she scored an aggregate of 133 with a high score of 79* against Lancashire.

=== England: Regional cricket ===
In 2019, Bryce was added to the Loughborough Lightning squad for the final season of the Women's Cricket Super League regional franchise competition. She was described by Women's CricZone as a "good find". Ahead of that competition, the England and Wales Cricket Board amended the tournament's regulations to allow Scotland players to appear without having to register as overseas players. Over a six-week period that year, Bryce took advantage of the amendment to become a regular opening bowler in the competition, and took a total of eight wickets.

Even at the start of the next season, 2020, Bryce was still something of an unknown quantity, after having played just one season in the then newly defunct Super League. However, she was appointed as captain of Loughborough's replacement team, Lightning, which covered a larger area, the East Midlands, and her sister, who had not yet played for a regional team, was recruited to play alongside her.

The sisters were signed on the basis that they would be released for international duty with Scotland as required; both were already ranked in the top 20 in the world in T20 internationals.

Bryce then took 14 wickets for Lightning (including best figures of 5/29), with an economy of 3.88, in six matches in the inaugural 50-over Rachael Heyhoe Flint Trophy competition. These were the most wickets bagged by any of her team's players in the competition, and the second-highest number taken overall; as a batter, she finished third in her team, with 141 runs.

The standout performance from Bryce that season was during Lightning's RHF Trophy match against Northern Diamonds at Durham. Bryce claimed a 5-wicket haul, and made 71*, but even that effort was not enough to overcome very strong opponents.

In December 2020, Bryce and her sister were awarded full-time contracts by Lightning, in recognition of their highly successful performances that year; of the 41 players nationally who were given a full-time regional contract, they were the only ones from an ICC Associate member nation.

As was observed by Emerging Cricket at the time, the full time contracts not only "... supported [the Bryce sisters] financially...", but also gave them "... increased access and opportunities to develop their game as professional cricketers beyond their lives as students and without having to potentially sacrifice representing their nation to earn a living overseas." Bryce herself had told Women's CricZone in September 2020 that playing domestic cricket professionally made it "... more of a possibility to be able to play regional cricket, but also be able to play for Scotland at the same time."

The following year, 2021, Bryce excelled in the second RHF Trophy. As well as being the second-highest run-scorer overall, with 353 runs at 50.42 including her List A high score of 162 against Central Sparks, she took 10 wickets and was named Player of the Year.

In that year's inaugural Charlotte Edwards Cup Twenty20 competition, she was much less successful with the bat, making only 29 runs in three appearances, but also took five wickets.

In the 2022 RHF Trophy, Bryce scored a more modest aggregate of 233 runs in five appearances, but at a higher average of 58.25. She was also the only player in that season's RHF Trophy to score two centuries, 109* against Thunder and 104 against Sunrisers in what turned out to be Lightning's only wins. In the Charlotte Edwards Cup, she made 129 runs including a half century, and took seven wickets, in six appearances.

Late in 2022, the Lightning team parted company from Loughborough University, was rebadged as The Blaze, and was relocated to Trent Bridge, Nottingham, to become the East Midlands' new regional side. Both Bryce and her sister remained as contracted members of the squad.

=== England: The Hundred ===
Bryce was recruited by Trent Rockets for The Hundred in 2021. In April 2022, she was re-signed by the Rockets ahead of the 2022 season. She did not play a prominent role in either season.

For the 2023 season, Bryce was drafted by Manchester Originals.

=== Australia ===
During the 2015–16 Australian season, Bryce spent three months at the Darren Lehmann Academy in Adelaide, South Australia, and played for Southern Districts in Adelaide's Premier Cricket league.

In November 2016, ahead of the WBBL|02 edition of Australia's Women's Big Bash League Twenty20 competition, Bryce was selected to be the Associate Rookie for Melbourne Stars under the ICC Associate Rookie programme. As an Associate Rookie, she was able to train for a fortnight alongside ICC Full Member international players including Meg Lanning, Jess Duffin, Danielle Hazell and Nat Sciver. She later said:

"It helped me a lot to be around top players in a big tournament, understanding how they prepare for each game and varying what they do."

The following Australian season, 2017–18, she returned Down Under for a second Associate Rookie stint, for a different team, Adelaide Strikers, during WBBL|03. Simultaneously, her sister was Associate Rookie for a third WBBL team, Hobart Hurricanes.

== International career ==
=== 2011–2017: Early years ===
Bryce made her international debut for Scotland's national team in 2011 at just 13 years of age, in a Women's County Championship match. Her call-up was sudden:

"Scotland were playing in Stirling nearby and one of the girls broke her thumb in the game before and they had a double header. So, I just got the call, asking if I could come along and play. So, that's how I made my debut for Scotland. It's probably a big learning experience being able to play at that level at such a young age."

For five years, she also took the field for the Scotland U17s team, and for nearly four of those years she captained the team. In her U17s international career, her most notable achievement was 173* against Lincolnshire Under 17s in 2015, during an unbroken partnership of 336 with her sister Sarah, and with their parents watching on. In 2020, in reminiscing to Women's CricZone about that partnership, she said:

"That was probably the big step in not just putting in good performances but putting in great performances at Under-17 level ...

We've played with each other for a number of years now, so we're really comfortable when we’re out batting together in the middle, but we also try and challenge each other and try and beat each other at the same time, make it a bit competitive. But also, when we're struggling, we know each other so well, so it's easy to know what to say and to help each other through that."

Bryce played regularly for the senior team throughout the 2010s, including in the 2015 ICC Women's World Twenty20 Qualifier in Thailand, the 2017 Women's Cricket World Cup Qualifier in Colombo, Sri Lanka, in February 2017, and the 2017 ICC Women's Qualifier Europe/Americas in Stirling, Scotland, which Scotland narrowly won from the Netherlands on net run rate, with Bryce and Lorna Jack forming a decisive opening duo. Also in 2017, she became the vice captain of the Scotland team.

=== 2018–2020: Captain, and Associate Cricketer of the Decade ===
Bryce was named as Scotland's new captain in April 2018, replacing Abbi Aitken. She had a few nerves in taking the reins, but was able to draw on her considerable experience as captain of the U17s, and also call for advice from her predecessor, who remained in the squad.

In July 2018, Bryce led the Scottish team at the 2018 ICC Women's World Twenty20 Qualifier tournament in the Netherlands. During the event, on 7 July 2018, she made her Women's Twenty20 International (WT20I) debut for Scotland against Uganda. In that match, which was also Scotland's first ever WT20I, Bryce took a wicket and two catches, and was batting in partnership with her sister when Scotland reached its nine wicket victory.

Over the course of the tournament as a whole, Bryce racked up the third highest aggregate number of runs, with 129, behind only her sister in second place, and Sterre Kalis of the Netherlands in first place. Additionally, she was named Player of the Match in two of the matches. Against Thailand, she scored 39* and took two wickets and a catch in a 27 run victory, and in a playoff against Papua New Guinea, she made 51* in leading her team to a 10 wicket victory and third place overall.

In July 2018, in recognition of her performance in the qualifier, she was selected in the ICC Women's Global Development Squad.

The following season, in June 2019, Bryce captained Scotland in the three team 2019 ICC Women's Qualifier Europe tournament in Spain. The other two competing teams were Germany and the Netherlands. Both Scotland and the Netherlands won three of their four matches, with Bryce finishing second on the aggregate run scorers table. Bryce also guided Scotland to victory in her team's second matches against the Netherlands (in a super over thriller) and Germany, with 34 and 65 runs, respectively. The Netherlands ultimately won the qualifier by recording a better net run rate, but Scotland, as the host of the next qualifying stage of the 2022 Women's Cricket World Cup, also qualified for that stage.

Scotland, the Netherlands, Ireland and Thailand then combined to participate in a quadrangular tournament in the Netherlands in August 2019, ahead of the 2019 ICC Women's World Twenty20 Qualifier tournament in Scotland. Bryce had to miss that tournament, due to commitments with Loughborough Lightning in the English domestic Super League competition. In her absence, her sister captained the Scottish side.

In late August/early September 2019, Bryce resumed the Scotland captaincy for the 2019 ICC Women's World Twenty20 Qualifier tournament. She was the leading run-scorer in the tournament, with 168 runs in five matches. Additionally, she was Player of the Match for scoring 29* and taking 2/6 in Scotland's Group A victory over the United States. She also later top scored with 73* in Scotland's defeat of the Netherlands in the playoff for fifth place, but was pipped by her sister for Player of the Match in that contest.

Bryce's score of 73* was influential in her substantial rise in the ICC Women's T20I Rankings when they were next updated on 10 September 2019. She jumped 16 positions to no. 21 in the batters rankings, and 11 places to no. 17 in the all-rounders list.

The COVID-19 pandemic then intervened. In September 2020, Bryce told Women's CricZone that in the last few years the Scotland team had been rebuilding after losing several senior players. However, the pandemic had made the immediate future uncertain:

"Unfortunately, we've not been able to play much this summer. It's a bit more difficult to know when we'll be able to get away and play some international fixtures. But it was looking really promising in 2018 when T20 international status gave a bit of a boost to the willingness of other teams to play more international cricket, which is really exciting."

In November 2020, Bryce and her sister were both nominated for the ICC Women's Associate Cricketer of the Decade award. Commenting on the two nominations, Bryce told Emerging Cricket:

"You don't really expect it, and I think it just shows how consistent we've been over the last few years and that's paid off. But it's one of those things that you don't really think about when you're actually playing. So it's really nice to have that and I hope it raises the profile of cricket in Scotland as three of the men's players have been nominated too which I think it shines a bright light on Scottish cricket which is awesome."

At the end of December 2020, the ICC announced that Bryce had won the award.

=== 2021–present ===
In April 2021, Bryce and her sister were members of an England academy team that played two pre-season T20s. The following month, they told ESPNcricinfo that it would be an agonising decision if they were asked to be part of England's national set-up.

Also in May 2021, Bryce led Scotland in the team's post-COVID-19 return to international competition, in a bilateral series against Ireland at Stormont in Belfast. After winning the first of the four matches by 11 runs, Scotland lost the series 1–3; Bryce made a total of 96 runs overall (second only to Gaby Lewis of Ireland), with her best individual performances being 2/8 in the first match, 45* in the third, and 2/23 in the fourth.

The following month, Bryce was named the ICC Women's Player of the Month for May 2021 for her performance in the series against Ireland. She was the first Associate woman to be nominated and the first Associate player to win the award. Also in June 2021, she became the first cricketer for Scotland, male or female, to make it into the top ten of the ICC Player Rankings, when she reached 10th position among batters. Additionally, she moved up to third in the T20I women's all-rounder rankings, behind only Sophie Devine of New Zealand and Nat Sciver of England.

Bryce then led Scotland to victory in the 2021 ICC Women's T20 World Cup Europe Qualifier, which was originally scheduled to take place in Scotland, but later moved to the La Manga Club, Spain, due to the COVID-19 pandemic, and held in August 2021. Scotland won all four of its matches, and therefore qualified for the 2022 ICC Women's T20 World Cup Qualifier. Bryce's high point in the tournament was in her team's contest against Ireland, in which she was named Player of the Match after scoring 46* in 58 balls to help Scotland overcome 89 on a challenging dry and uneven pitch.

In January 2022, Bryce captained Scotland's team in the 2022 Commonwealth Games Cricket Qualifier tournament in Malaysia, and finished second in the tournament's table of wicket takers, with 7 wickets. In both of Scotland's wins in the five-team qualifier, against Malaysia and Kenya, she was named Player of the Match, for top-scoring with 62* and 27, respectively. However, Scotland lost its two other matches, against eventual qualifier winners Sri Lanka, and Bangladesh, respectively, and eventually finished third in a tournament in which only the first placed team qualified.

Bryce then missed Scotland's next matches, during a home bilateral series against Ireland in September 2022; her sister stood-in as captain.

At the end of that month, Bryce returned to the team and resumed the captaincy for the 2022 ICC Women's T20 World Cup Qualifier in Abu Dhabi, United Arab Emirates. In her five innings in that tournament, she made the third highest number of runs, an aggregate of 153 including two half centuries, behind only Tanya Ruma of Papua New Guinea and Nigar Sultana of Bangladesh.

Scotland's final match of the qualifier was a playoff against Papua New Guinea for fifth place. The match was also Bryce's 100th for her country, and as well as having her sister alongside her in the team, she had her parents in the crowd. She also top scored for Scotland, with 63* in a total of 168-6, but Papua New Guinea, led by Ruma who scored a matching 63*, then overcame that total, to relegate Scotland to sixth place in the qualifier.

At the 2024 ICC Women's T20 World Cup Qualifier in Abu Dhabi, Bryce captained Scotland to their maiden qualification for the finals to be held in Bangladesh later in the year, scoring the game-winning runs and earning player of the match honors in the deciding match against Ireland.

In September 2024 she was named as captain of the Scotland squad for the 2024 ICC Women's T20 World Cup.

Bryce captained the Scotland squad for the 2025 Women's Cricket World Cup Qualifier in Pakistan in April 2025. During their final match of the tournament against Ireland, she scored her maiden ODI century, making 131 not out.

== FairBreak career ==
Bryce has played for the Warriors team in two FairBreak Invitational T20 competitions. She had previously played in a match organised by FairBreak Global in England in July 2019. At the inaugural Invitational tournament, held in Dubai in May 2022, she did not feature prominently, making only 31 runs at 15.50 and taking 2 wickets.

During the second tournament, in Hong Kong in April 2023, she was much more successful. Early in that tournament, she helped the Warriors to victory in matches against South Coast Sapphires, in which she took 3/25, and against the Falcons, for which she was named Player of the Match after taking the important wickets of Chamari Athapaththu and Marizanne Kapp, and a catch to dismiss Falcons captain Suzie Bates. Later, in a match against Barmy Army, she took 2/29, and then scored 45 runs in 26 balls, but Barmy Army won that match, by 17 runs.

In the first semi final, against Spirit, Bryce was named Player of the Match for scoring 26 in 18 balls, and taking 2/6, to guide the Warriors to victory. In the final against the Falcons, from which the Warriors emerged as the winner, she finished on 52* from 20 balls, and took 3/16, but was pipped for Player of the Match by Hayley Matthews, who made 123 in 52 balls. She also topped the tournament's wicket tally, with 13 wickets overall.

== Playing style and personality ==
Bryce is an all-rounder who bowls swinging right-arm medium pacers and bats right-handed. According to ESPNcricinfo, she "... finds prodigious inswing with a new white ball ... and is an improving batter ..."

Matt Roller wrote for ESPNcricinfo in May 2021 that Bryce's outstanding performance in Lightning's Rachael Heyhoe Flint Trophy match against Northern Diamonds the previous season:

"... epitomised Kathryn as a player: an anchoring No. 3 at domestic level who can manipulate the field and score heavily down the ground after getting set, and a new-ball bowler with the ability to swing the ball prodigiously into the right-handers. She is a swing bowler rather than an out-and-out quick - to the extent that [her sister] Sarah stands up to the stumps while keeping to her, but manages to get the ball tailing late."

Cricket Scotland has observed that Bryce has quite often opened the bowling and batted at 3 for the national squad, and has also praised her as "... an excellent fielder." Referring to her captaincy, The Cricketer has described her as "level-headed".

Aside from cricket, Bryce's passion in life is music. She achieved Grade 8 in both clarinet and violin, was a member of several orchestras and sang in choirs.

== Honours ==
=== Team ===
- FairBreak Invitational T20 champion: 2023 Hong Kong

=== Individual ===
- ICC Associate Cricketer of the Decade: 2011–2020
- ICC Women's Player of the Month: May 2021
- Rachael Heyhoe Flint Trophy Player of the Year: 2021
- Professional Cricketers' Association 2024 Women's Player of the Year.
- Female Athlete of the Year (Cricket): 2024
