= 2023 FairBreak Invitational T20 Hong Kong =

Invitational women's cricket competition

- Dates: 3 – 16 April 2023
- Administrator(s): FairBreak Global; Cricket Hong Kong
- Cricket format: Twenty20
- Tournament format(s): Round-robin and knockouts
- Champions: Warriors (1st title)
- Participants: 6
- Matches: 20
- Most runs: Chamari Athapaththu (281)
- Most wickets: Kathryn Bryce (13)

The 2023 FairBreak Invitational T20 was the second edition of the FairBreak Invitational T20, a women's Twenty20 cricket competition, which was held from 3 to 16 April 2023 at the Kowloon Cricket Club in Hong Kong. The tournament, sanctioned by the ICC, was being privately run by FairBreak Global, a company that aims to promote gender equality. A total of 90 players from 28 countries were spread across six teams. The tournament was won by Warriors, who beat Falcons in the final by 94 runs.

An additional tournament for 2023, staged in collaboration with USA Cricket, will be played in Houston, Texas, USA, between 15 and 30 September 2023.

== Competition format ==
Teams played each other team once, with two matches taking place on most days. The top four teams in the group advanced to the semi-finals. All matches took place at Kowloon Cricket Club.

The group worked on a points system with positions being based on total points. Points were awarded as follows:

Win: 3 points.
Tie: 2 points.
Loss: 0 points.
Abandoned/No Result: 2 points.
Bonus Point: 1 point awarded to the team with the highest score after 10 overs of the batting innings.

== Teams ==
Barmy Army Coach: Michael Bates	Falcons Coach: Joanne Broadbent	South Coast Sapphires Coach: Shane Deitz
(England) Lauren Winfield-Hill (c); (Bangladesh) Rumana Ahmed; (Cricket West Indies) Shemaine Campbelle; (Brazil) Laura Cardoso; (Nepal) Rubina Chhetry; (Cricket West Indies) Deandra Dottin; (United Arab Emirates) Kavisha Egodage; (Hong Kong) Keenu Gill; (Brazil) Roberta Moretti Avery; (United States) Tara Norris; (Hong Kong) Iqra Sahar; (Pakistan) Fatima Sana; (Bangladesh) Nigar Sultana; (Hong Kong) Ruchitha Venkatesh; (South Africa) Laura Wolvaardt	(New Zealand) Suzie Bates (c); (Bangladesh) Jahanara Alam; (Papua New Guinea) Kaia Arua; (Sri Lanka) Chamari Athapaththu; (Malaysia) Mas Elysa; (Germany) Christina Gough; (Bhutan) Anju Gurung; (Hong Kong) Mariko Hill; (South Africa) Marizanne Kapp; (Thailand) Nannapat Koncharoenkai; (Hong Kong) Marina Lamplough; (United Arab Emirates) Theertha Satish; (Sweden) Gunjan Shukla; (Thailand) Sornnarin Tippoch; (England) Danni Wyatt	(Pakistan) Sana Mir (c); (United States) Jivana Aras; (Australia) Erin Burns; (Hong Kong) Kary Chan; (United States) Aditi Chudasama; (Netherlands) Babette de Leede; (England) Tash Farrant; (South Africa) Shabnim Ismail; (Papua New Guinea) Sibona Jimmy; (United States) Geetika Kodali; (Ireland) Gaby Lewis; (Australia) Katie Mack; (Kuwait) Maryam Omar; (England) Katherine Sciver-Brunt; (Hong Kong) Pull To
Spirit Coach: Damien Wright	Tornadoes Coach: Anju Jain	Warriors Coach: Julia Price
(Australia) Nicola Carey (c); (United States) Gargi Bhogle; (Thailand) Nattaya Boochatham; (Scotland) Sarah Bryce; (Thailand) Naruemol Chaiwai; (Hong Kong) Betty Chan; (Thailand) Natthakan Chantam; (Hong Kong) Yasmin Daswani; (England) Sophia Dunkley; (United Arab Emirates) Mahika Gaur; (South Africa) Ayabonga Khaka; (Pakistan) Bismah Maroof; (Japan) Shizuka Miyaji; (New Zealand) Nensi Patel; (New Zealand) Kerry-Anne Tomlinson	(Cricket West Indies) Stafanie Taylor (c); (Pakistan) Diana Baig; (Hong Kong) Maryam Bibi; (England) Ariana Dowse; (Malaysia) Winifred Duraisingam; (Netherlands) Sterre Kalis; (South Africa) Suné Luus; (Nepal) Sita Magar; (Hong Kong) Natasha Miles; (Zimbabwe) Mary-Anne Musonda; (Japan) Akari Kano; (Pakistan) Aliya Riaz; (Thailand) Chanida Sutthiruang; (South Africa) Dane van Niekerk; (Austria) Andrea-Mae Zepeda	(United States) Sindhu Sriharsha (c); (Scotland) Kathryn Bryce; (Cricket West Indies) Shamilia Connell; (South Africa) Mignon du Preez; (Australia) Ellie Johnston; (New Zealand) Jess Kerr; (Namibia) Yasmeen Khan; (Australia) Phoebe Litchfield; (Argentina) Mariana Martinez; (Cricket West Indies) Hayley Matthews; (United Arab Emirates) Esha Oza; (Papua New Guinea) Tanya Ruma; (Hong Kong) Shanzeen Shahzad; (Hong Kong) Alison Sui; (Australia) Amanda-Jade Wellington

Source: FairBreak

== Points table ==
Team	Pld	W	L	T	A	BP	NRR	Pts
Warriors (Q)	5	3	1	0	1	3	+1.308	15
Barmy Army (Q)	5	4	1	0	0	1.5	+1.093	13.5
Falcons (Q)	5	3	2	0	0	3	+1.160	13
Spirit (Q)	5	3	2	0	0	2.5	+0.173	11.5
South Coast Sapphires	5	1	4	0	0	2	-0.735	5
Tornadoes	5	0	4	0	1	0	-2.500	2

Advanced to knockout stage

Source: ESPN Cricinfo

== Fixtures ==
Source: FairBreak

=== Group stage ===
3 April 2023
14:00
Scorecard

Falcons; 150/6 (20 overs)	v	Tornadoes; 109/9 (20 overs)
Theertha Satish 57 (40); Winifred Duraisingam 2/34 (4 overs)		Suné Luus 48 (35); Marizanne Kapp 3/4 (3 overs)

Falcons won by 41 runs
Kowloon Cricket Club, Kowloon, Hong Kong
Umpires: Jacqueline Williams (WI) and Viswanadan Kalidas (Mal)
Player of the match: Theertha Satish (Falcons)

- Tornadoes won the toss and elected to field.
- Points: Falcons 4, Tornadoes 0

4 April 2023
10:00
Scorecard

South Coast Sapphires; 111/7 (20 overs)	v	Warriors; 115/3 (12.4 overs)
Babette De Leede 24 (36); Kathryn Bryce 3/25 (4 overs)		Phoebe Litchfield 77 (37); Katherine Sciver-Brunt 1/13 (2 overs)

Warriors won by 7 wickets
Kowloon Cricket Club, Kowloon, Hong Kong
Umpires: Jacqueline Williams (WI) and Tabarak Dar (HKG)
Player of the match: Phoebe Litchfield (Warriors)

- Warriors won the toss and elected to field.
- Points: Warriors 4, South Coast Sapphires 0

4 April 2023
14:00
Scorecard

Barmy Army; 135/5 (20 overs)	v	Spirit; 138/6 (18.2 overs)
Shemaine Campbelle 33* (25); Betty Chan 2/15 (3 overs)		Nicola Carey 40* (30); Rumana Ahmed 2/21 (4 overs)

Spirit won by 4 wickets
Kowloon Cricket Club, Kowloon, Hong Kong
Umpires: Anna Harris (Eng) and Shivani Mishra (Qat)
Player of the match: Mahika Gaur (Spirit)

- Spirit won the toss and elected to field.
- Points: Spirit 4, Barmy Army 0

5 April 2023
10:00
Scorecard

Warriors; 84/3 (12 overs)	v	Tornadoes
Phoebe Litchfield 27 (21); Aliya Riaz 1/12 (2 overs)

No result
Kowloon Cricket Club, Kowloon, Hong Kong
Umpires: Sarika Prasad (Sin) and Shivani Mishra (Qat)

- Tornadoes won the toss and elected to field.
- No further play possible due to rain.
- Points: Warriors 2, Tornadoes 2

5 April 2023
14:00
Scorecard

Barmy Army; 143/6 (20 overs)	v	Falcons; 134/9 (20 overs)
Lauren Winfield-Hill 54 (35); Chamari Athapaththu 4/17 (4 overs)		Chamari Athapaththu 44 (33); Kavisha Egodage 3/17 (4 overs)

Barmy Army won by 9 runs
Kowloon Cricket Club, Kowloon, Hong Kong
Umpires: John Prakash (HKG) and Simon Taufel (Aus)
Player of the match: Laura Cardoso (Barmy Army)

- Falcons won the toss and elected to field.
- Points: Barmy Army 3, Falcons 1

7 April 2023
10:00
Scorecard

Spirit; 121/8 (20 overs)	v	South Coast Sapphires; 109/9 (20 overs)
Nicola Carey 52 (34); Katherine Sciver-Brunt 2/20 (4 overs)		Katherine Sciver-Brunt 47 (29); Ayabonga Khaka 4/13 (4 overs)

Spirit won by 12 runs
Kowloon Cricket Club, Kowloon, Hong Kong
Umpires: Claire Polosak (Aus) and Lauren Agenbag (SA)
Player of the match: Ayabonga Khaka (Spirit)

- South Coast Sapphires won the toss and elected to field.
- Points: Spirit 3.5, South Coast Sapphires 0.5

7 April 2023
14:00
Scorecard

Falcons; 133/8 (20 overs)	v	Warriors; 134/5 (17.4 overs)
Theertha Satish 45 (37); Yasmeen Khan 2/9 (2 overs)		Ellie Johnston 38 (27); Mariko Hill 3/11 (2.4 overs)

Warriors won by 5 wickets
Kowloon Cricket Club, Kowloon, Hong Kong
Umpires: Anna Harris (Eng) and Sarika Prasad (Sin)
Player of the match: Kathryn Bryce (Warriors)

- Falcons won the toss and elected to bat.
- Points: Warriors 4, Falcons 0

8 April 2023
10:00
Scorecard

Tornadoes; 160/4 (20 overs)	v	Barmy Army; 162/0 (15.4 overs)
Suné Luus 65* (43); Fatima Sana 1/24 (4 overs)		Lauren Winfield-Hill 120* (64)

Barmy Army won by 10 wickets
Kowloon Cricket Club, Kowloon, Hong Kong
Umpires: Lauren Agenbag (SA) and Simon Taufel (Aus)
Player of the match: Lauren Winfield-Hill (Barmy Army)

- Barmy Army won the toss and elected to field.
- Points: Barmy Army 4, Tornadoes 0

8 April 2023
14:00
Scorecard

Warriors; 118 (17.4 overs)	v	Spirit; 115/8 (20 overs)
Ellie Johnston 40 (24); Sophia Dunkley 3/26 (3.4 overs)		Bismah Maroof 66* (60); Amanda-Jade Wellington 3/27 (4 overs)

Warriors won by 3 runs
Kowloon Cricket Club, Kowloon, Hong Kong
Umpires: Jacqueline Williams (WI) and Viswanadan Kalidas (Mal)
Player of the match: Amanda-Jade Wellington (Warriors)

- Spirit won the toss and elected to field.
- Points: Warriors 4, Spirit 0

9 April 2023
10:00
Scorecard

South Coast Sapphires; 95/2 (7 overs)	v	Tornadoes; 59/5 (7 overs)
Tash Farrant 36* (18); Diana Baig 2/23 (2 overs)		Suné Luus 13 (6); Tash Farrant 3/11 (2 overs)

South Coast Sapphires won by 36 runs
Kowloon Cricket Club, Kowloon, Hong Kong
Umpires: Shivani Mishra (Qat) and Tabarak Dar (HK)
Player of the match: Tash Farrant (South Coast Sapphires)

- Tornadoes won the toss and elected to field.
- Match reduced to 7 overs per side due to rain.
- Points: South Coast Sapphires 4, Tornadoes 0

9 April 2023
14:00
Scorecard

Barmy Army; 163/6 (20 overs)	v	Warriors; 146 (20 overs)
Deandra Dottin 69 (48); Kathryn Bryce 2/29 (4 overs)		Kathryn Bryce 45 (26); Deandra Dottin 2/9 (3 overs)

Barmy Army won by 17 runs
Kowloon Cricket Club, Kowloon, Hong Kong
Umpires: Humaira Farah (Pak) and Claire Polosak (Aus)
Player of the match: Deandra Dottin (Barmy Army)

- Warriors won the toss and elected to field.
- Points: Barmy Army 3, Warriors 1

11 April 2023
10:00
Scorecard

South Coast Sapphires; 131 (20 overs)	v	Falcons; 133/1 (13.3 overs)
Kary Chan 32 (26); Marizanne Kapp 3/15 (4 overs)		Chamari Athapaththu 75* (44); Sana Mir 1/10 (2 overs)

Falcons won by 9 wickets
Kowloon Cricket Club, Kowloon, Hong Kong
Umpires: Humaira Farah (Pak) and John Prakash (HKG)
Player of the match: Chamari Athapaththu (Falcons)

- Falcons won the toss and elected to field.
- Points: Falcons 4, South Coast Sapphires 0

11 April 2023
14:00
Scorecard

Tornadoes; 150/4 (20 overs)	v	Spirit; 155/4 (15.4 overs)
Stafanie Taylor 61* (48); Sophia Dunkley 2/20 (4 overs)		Nicola Carey 84* (28); Aliya Riaz 2/15 (3 overs)

Spirit won by 6 wickets
Kowloon Cricket Club, Kowloon, Hong Kong
Umpires: Simon Taufel (Aus) and Viswanadan Kalidas (Mal)
Player of the match: Nicola Carey (Spirit)

- Tornadoes won the toss and elected to bat.
- Points: Spirit 4, Tornadoes 0

12 April 2023
10:00
Scorecard

Barmy Army; 168/8 (20 overs)	v	South Coast Sapphires; 107 (15.5 overs)
Laura Wolvaardt 49 (32); Jivana Aras 4/32 (4 overs)		Tash Farrant 32 (32); Rubina Chhetry 5/11 (4 overs)

Barmy Army won by 61 runs
Kowloon Cricket Club, Kowloon, Hong Kong
Umpires: Anna Harris (Eng) and Sarika Prasad (Sin)
Player of the match: Rubina Chhetry (Barmy Army)

- South Coast Sapphires won the toss and elected to field.
- Points: Barmy Army 3.5, South Coast Sapphires 0.5

12 April 2023
14:00
Scorecard

Spirit; 137/9 (20 overs)	v	Falcons; 140/1 (14.2 overs)
Kerry-Anne Tomlinson 65 (46); Chamari Athapaththu 3/9 (4 overs)		Danni Wyatt 76* (41); Nensi Patel 1/6 (2 overs)

Falcons won by 9 wickets
Kowloon Cricket Club, Kowloon, Hong Kong
Umpires: John Prakash (HKG) and Lauren Agenbag (SA)
Player of the match: Chamari Athapaththu (Falcons)

- Spirit won the toss and elected to bat.
- Points: Falcons 4, Spirit 0

=== Knockout stage ===
==== Fifth-place play-off ====
14 April 2023
10:00
Scorecard

Tornadoes; 115/5 (20 overs)	v	South Coast Sapphires; 60 (14.2 overs)
Stafanie Taylor 24 (17); Shabnim Ismail 2/8 (4 overs)		Katie Mack 11 (13); Winifred Duraisingam 3/8 (2.2 overs)

Tornadoes won by 55 runs
Kowloon Cricket Club, Kowloon, Hong Kong
Umpires: Humaira Farah (Pak) and Shivani Mishra (Qat)
Player of the match: Chanida Sutthiruang (Tornadoes)

- South Coast Sapphires won the toss and elected to field.

==== Semi-finals ====
15 April 2023
10:00
Scorecard

Spirit; 73 (17.4 overs)	v	Warriors; 74/6 (13.1 overs)
Natthakan Chantham 26 (34); Jess Kerr 3/11 (2.4 overs)		Kathryn Bryce 26 (18); Sophia Dunkley 3/16 (3 overs)

Warriors won by 4 wickets
Kowloon Cricket Club, Kowloon, Hong Kong
Umpires: Lauren Agenbag (SA) and Tabarak Dar (HGK)
Player of the match: Kathryn Bryce (Warriors)

- Warriors won the toss and elected to field.

15 April 2023
14:00
Scorecard

Barmy Army; 158/8 (20 overs)	v	Falcons; 161/4 (18.1 overs)
Fatima Sana 45* (30); Marizanne Kapp 3/18 (4 overs)		Chamari Athapaththu 78 (50); Rubina Chhetry 2/41 (4 overs)

Falcons won by 6 wickets
Kowloon Cricket Club, Kowloon, Hong Kong
Umpires: Anna Harris (Eng) and Viswanadan Kalidas (Mal)
Player of the match: Chamari Athapaththu (Falcons)

- Falcons won the toss and elected to field.

==== Third-place play-off ====
16 April 2023
10:00
Scorecard

Barmy Army; 147/4 (20 overs)	v	Spirit; 125/6 (20 overs)
Deandra Dottin 75 (38); Mahika Gaur 1/12 (4 overs)		Kerry-Anne Tomlinson 33 (40); Laura Cardoso 2/31 (4 overs)

Barmy Army won by 22 runs
Kowloon Cricket Club, Kowloon, Hong Kong
Umpires: John Prakash (HKG) and Sarika Prasad (Sin)
Player of the match: Deandra Dottin (Barmy Army)

- Spirit won the toss and elected to field.

==== Final ====
16 April 2023
14:00
Scorecard

Warriors; 230/4 (20 overs)	v	Falcons; 137/8 (20 overs)
Hayley Matthews 123 (52); Anju Gurung 2/43 (4 overs)		Chamari Athapaththu 29 (17); Kathryn Bryce 3/16 (4 overs)

Warriors won by 94 runs
Kowloon Cricket Club, Kowloon, Hong Kong
Umpires: Claire Polosak (Aus) and Jacqueline Williams (WI)
Player of the match: Hayley Matthews (Warriors)

- Falcons won the toss and elected to field.

== Final standings ==
Position	Team
1st	Warriors
2nd	Falcons
3rd	Barmy Army
4th	Spirit
5th	Tornadoes
6th	South Coast Sapphires

== Statistics ==
=== Most runs ===
Player	Team	Matches	Innings	Runs	Average	HS	100s	50s
(Sri Lanka) Chamari Athapaththu	Falcons	7	7	281	46.83	78	0	2
(England) Lauren Winfield-Hill	Barmy Army	7	7	213	42.60	120*	1	1
(Cricket West Indies) Deandra Dottin	Barmy Army	5	5	201	40.20	75	0	2
(Australia) Nicola Carey	Spirit	7	7	200	40.00	84*	0	2
(United Arab Emirates) Theertha Satish	Falcons	7	6	172	34.40	57	0	1

Source: ESPNcricinfo

=== Most wickets ===
Player	Team	Overs	Wickets	Average	BBI	5w
(Scotland) Kathryn Bryce	Warriors	23.0	13	9.07	3/16	0
(Sri Lanka) Chamari Athapaththu	Falcons	25.0	12	13.75	4/17	0
(South Africa) Marizanne Kapp	Falcons	18.0	9	8.33	3/4	0
(Thailand) Sornnarin Tippoch	Falcons	21.0	9	17.00	3/13	0
(Hong Kong) Mariko Hill	Falcons	12.4	8	11.00	3/11	0
(Nepal) Rubina Chhetry	Barmy Army	17	8	12.50	5/11	1

Source: ESPNcricinfo
