= ICC Players of the Month =

- Previous: October 2026; 13 November 2026; Next: November 2026
- Awarded for: top performers in all forms of international cricket in the preceding calendar month
- Site: men's (voting) women's (voting)
- Established: 27 January 2021
- First award: 8 February 2021 (for January 2021)
- Recent winners (October 2026): (South Africa) Marco Jansen (India) Deepti Sharma

Highlights
- Most wins: (India) Shubman Gill (5) (Cricket West Indies) Hayley Matthews (5)
- Total: 70 (men's); 69 (women's)

The ICC Players of the Month are awarded monthly by the International Cricket Council (ICC), in recognition of the top performers in all forms of international cricket in the preceding calendar month. Three nominees are shortlisted each month for both genders and the winners are determined through a hybrid voting process.

As of October 2026 awards, 70 men's awards and 69 women's awards have been awarded. India's Shubman Gill (5) and West Indies' Hayley Matthews (5) have won the award most times in each gender respectively.

== Selection process ==
On 27 January 2021, the International Cricket Council (ICC) announced a new monthly award to recognise the top performers in all forms of international cricket in each calendar month. At the start of each month, three nominees are shortlisted for each gender by the ICC Awards Nominations Committee based on their on-field and overall performances in tour matches and tournaments in the preceding month. An Independent Voting Academy (IVA) composed of former players, broadcasters, and journalists have 90% vote-share, while registered fans have a 10% vote-share. The IVA forwards their vote via emails to the Nominations Committee, while registered fans can vote via icc-cricket.com.

== Men's awards ==
Winners and nominees for ICC Men's Player of the Month
Month	Winners	Other nominees		Dates (Note: Announcement dates of nominees and winners respectively.)	Ref.
January 2021	(India) Rishabh Pant	National cricket team	National cricket team		
February 2021	(India) Ravichandran Ashwin	National cricket team	National cricket team		
March 2021	(India) Bhuvneshwar Kumar	National cricket team	National cricket team		
April 2021	(Pakistan) Babar Azam	National cricket team	National cricket team		
May 2021	(Bangladesh) Mushfiqur Rahim	National cricket team	National cricket team		
June 2021	(New Zealand) Devon Conway	National cricket team	National cricket team		
July 2021	(Bangladesh) Shakib Al Hasan	National cricket team	National cricket team		
August 2021	(England) Joe Root	National cricket team	National cricket team		
September 2021	(Nepal) Sandeep Lamichhane	National cricket team	National cricket team		
October 2021	(Pakistan) Asif Ali	National cricket team	National cricket team		
November 2021	(Australia) David Warner	National cricket team	National cricket team		
December 2021	(New Zealand) Ajaz Patel	National cricket team	National cricket team		
January 2022	(South Africa) Keegan Petersen	National cricket team	National cricket team		
February 2022	(India) Shreyas Iyer	National cricket team	National cricket team		
March 2022	(Pakistan) Babar Azam (2)	National cricket team	National cricket team		
April 2022	(South Africa) Keshav Maharaj	National cricket team	National cricket team		
May 2022	(Sri Lanka) Angelo Mathews	National cricket team	National cricket team		
June 2022	(England) Jonny Bairstow	National cricket team	National cricket team		
July 2022	(Sri Lanka) Prabath Jayasuriya	National cricket team	National cricket team		
August 2022	(Zimbabwe) Sikandar Raza	National cricket team	National cricket team		
September 2022	(Pakistan) Mohammad Rizwan	National cricket team	National cricket team		
October 2022	(India) Virat Kohli	National cricket team	National cricket team		
November 2022	(England) Jos Buttler	National cricket team	National cricket team		
December 2022	(England) Harry Brook	National cricket team	National cricket team		
January 2023	(India) Shubman Gill	National cricket team	National cricket team		
February 2023	(England) Harry Brook (2)	National cricket team	National cricket team		
March 2023	(Bangladesh) Shakib Al Hasan (2)	National cricket team	National cricket team		
April 2023	(Pakistan) Fakhar Zaman	National cricket team	National cricket team		
May 2023	(Ireland) Harry Tector	National cricket team	National cricket team		
June 2023	(Sri Lanka) Wanindu Hasaranga	National cricket team	National cricket team		
July 2023	(England) Chris Woakes	National cricket team	National cricket team		
August 2023	(Pakistan) Babar Azam (3)	National cricket team	National cricket team		
September 2023	(India) Shubman Gill (2)	National cricket team	National cricket team		
October 2023	(New Zealand) Rachin Ravindra	National cricket team	National cricket team		
November 2023	(Australia) Travis Head	National cricket team	National cricket team		
December 2023	(Australia) Pat Cummins	National cricket team	National cricket team		
January 2024	(Cricket West Indies) Shamar Joseph	National cricket team	National cricket team		
February 2024	(India) Yashasvi Jaiswal	National cricket team	National cricket team		
March 2024	(Sri Lanka) Kamindu Mendis	National cricket team	National cricket team		
April 2024	(United Arab Emirates) Muhammad Waseem	National cricket team	National cricket team		
May 2024	(Cricket West Indies) Gudakesh Motie	National cricket team	National cricket team		
June 2024	(India) Jasprit Bumrah	National cricket team	National cricket team		
July 2024	(England) Gus Atkinson	National cricket team	National cricket team		
August 2024	(Sri Lanka) Dunith Wellalage	National cricket team	National cricket team		
September 2024	(Sri Lanka) Kamindu Mendis (2)	National cricket team	National cricket team		
October 2024	(Pakistan) Noman Ali	National cricket team	National cricket team		
November 2024	(Pakistan) Haris Rauf	National cricket team	National cricket team		
December 2024	(India) Jasprit Bumrah (2)	National cricket team	National cricket team		
January 2025	(Cricket West Indies) Jomel Warrican	National cricket team	National cricket team		
February 2025	(India) Shubman Gill (3)	National cricket team	National cricket team		
March 2025	(India) Shreyas Iyer (2)	National cricket team	National cricket team		
April 2025	(Bangladesh) Mehidy Hasan Miraz	National cricket team	National cricket team		
May 2025	(United Arab Emirates) Muhammad Waseem (2)	National cricket team	National cricket team		
June 2025	(South Africa) Aiden Markram	National cricket team	National cricket team	14 July 2025	
July 2025	(India) Shubman Gill (4)	National cricket team	National cricket team	6 August 2025; 12 August 2025	
August 2025	(India) Mohammed Siraj	National cricket team	National cricket team	8 September 2025; 15 September 2025	
September 2025	(India) Abhishek Sharma	National cricket team	National cricket team	7 October 2025; 16 October 2025	
October 2025	(South Africa) Senuran Muthusamy	National cricket team	National cricket team	6 November 2025; 12 November 2025	
November 2025	(South Africa) Simon Harmer	National cricket team	National cricket team	5 December 2025; 15 December 2025	
December 2025	(Australia) Mitchell Starc	National cricket team	National cricket team	8 January 2026; 15 January 2026	
January 2026	(New Zealand) Daryl Mitchell	National cricket team	National cricket team	21 February 2026; 28 February 2026	
February 2026	(Pakistan) Sahibzada Farhan	National cricket team	National cricket team	16 March 2026; 23 March 2026	
March 2026	(India) Sanju Samson	National cricket team	National cricket team	6 April 2026; 14 April 2026	
April 2026	(Bangladesh) Nahid Rana	National cricket team	National cricket team	8 May 2026; 14 May 2026	
May 2026	(Bangladesh) Mushfiqur Rahim (2)	National cricket team	National cricket team	10 June 2026; 22 June 2026	
June 2026	(New Zealand) Nathan Smith	National cricket team	National cricket team	13 July 2026; 20 July 2026	
July 2026	(Cricket West Indies) Justin Greaves	(England) Harry Brook	(Bangladesh) Tanzid Hasan	10 August 2026; 18 August 2026	
August 2026	(Sri Lanka) Sonal Dinusha	(England) Ollie Robinson	(Bangladesh) Hasan Mahmud	10 September 2026; 17 September 2026	
September 2026	(India) Shubman Gill (5)	(India) Abhishek Sharma	(Zimbabwe) Sikandar Raza	6 October 2026; 13 October 2026	
October 2026	(South Africa) Marco Jansen	(Pakistan) Arafat Minhas	(Cricket West Indies) Shai Hope	5 November 2026; 13 November 2026	

== Women's awards ==
Winners and nominees for ICC Women's Player of the Month
Month	Winners	Other nominees		Dates	Ref.
January 2021	(South Africa) Shabnim Ismail	Women's national cricket team	Women's national cricket team		
February 2021	(England) Tammy Beaumont	Women's national cricket team	Women's national cricket team		
March 2021	(South Africa) Lizelle Lee	Women's national cricket team	Women's national cricket team		
April 2021	(Australia) Alyssa Healy	Women's national cricket team	Women's national cricket team		
May 2021	(Scotland) Kathryn Bryce	Women's national cricket team	Women's national cricket team		
June 2021	(England) Sophie Ecclestone	Women's national cricket team	Women's national cricket team		
July 2021	(Cricket West Indies) Stafanie Taylor	Women's national cricket team	Women's national cricket team		
August 2021	(Ireland) Eimear Richardson	Women's national cricket team	Women's national cricket team		
September 2021	(England) Heather Knight	Women's national cricket team	Women's national cricket team		
October 2021	(Ireland) Laura Delany	Women's national cricket team	Women's national cricket team		
November 2021	(Cricket West Indies) Hayley Matthews	Women's national cricket team	Women's national cricket team		
December 2021	—N/a (Note: No women's award was awarded for December 2021, as no women's international match took place that month.)				
January 2022	(England) Heather Knight (2)	Women's national cricket team	Women's national cricket team		
February 2022	(New Zealand) Amelia Kerr	Women's national cricket team	Women's national cricket team		
March 2022	(Australia) Rachael Haynes	Women's national cricket team	Women's national cricket team		
April 2022	(Australia) Alyssa Healy (2)	Women's national cricket team	Women's national cricket team		
May 2022	(Pakistan) Tuba Hassan	Women's national cricket team	Women's national cricket team		
June 2022	(South Africa) Marizanne Kapp	Women's national cricket team	Women's national cricket team		
July 2022	(England) Emma Lamb	Women's national cricket team	Women's national cricket team		
August 2022	(Australia) Tahlia McGrath	Women's national cricket team	Women's national cricket team		
September 2022	(India) Harmanpreet Kaur	Women's national cricket team	Women's national cricket team		
October 2022	(Pakistan) Nida Dar	Women's national cricket team	Women's national cricket team		
November 2022	(Pakistan) Sidra Ameen	Women's national cricket team	Women's national cricket team		
December 2022	(Australia) Ashleigh Gardner	Women's national cricket team	Women's national cricket team		
January 2023	(England) Grace Scrivens	Women's national cricket team	Women's national cricket team		
February 2023	(Australia) Ashleigh Gardner (2)	Women's national cricket team	Women's national cricket team		
March 2023	(Rwanda) Henriette Ishimwe	Women's national cricket team	Women's national cricket team		
April 2023	(Thailand) Naruemol Chaiwai	Women's national cricket team	Women's national cricket team		
May 2023	(Thailand) Thipatcha Putthawong	Women's national cricket team	Women's national cricket team		
June 2023	(Australia) Ashleigh Gardner (3)	Women's national cricket team	Women's national cricket team		
July 2023	(Australia) Ashleigh Gardner (4)	Women's national cricket team	Women's national cricket team		
August 2023	(Ireland) Arlene Kelly	Women's national cricket team	Women's national cricket team		
September 2023	(Sri Lanka) Chamari Athapaththu	Women's national cricket team	Women's national cricket team		
October 2023	(Cricket West Indies) Hayley Matthews (2)	Women's national cricket team	Women's national cricket team		
November 2023	(Bangladesh) Nahida Akter	Women's national cricket team	Women's national cricket team		
December 2023	(India) Deepti Sharma	Women's national cricket team	Women's national cricket team		
January 2024	(Ireland) Amy Hunter	Women's national cricket team	Women's national cricket team		
February 2024	(Australia) Annabel Sutherland	Women's national cricket team	Women's national cricket team		
March 2024	(England) Maia Bouchier	Women's national cricket team	Women's national cricket team		
April 2024	(Cricket West Indies) Hayley Matthews (3)	Women's national cricket team	Women's national cricket team		
May 2024	(Sri Lanka) Chamari Athapaththu (2)	Women's national cricket team	Women's national cricket team		
June 2024	(India) Smriti Mandhana	Women's national cricket team	Women's national cricket team		
July 2024	(Sri Lanka) Chamari Athapaththu (3)	Women's national cricket team	Women's national cricket team		
August 2024	(Sri Lanka) Harshitha Samarawickrama	Women's national cricket team	Women's national cricket team		
September 2024	(England) Tammy Beaumont (2)	Women's national cricket team	Women's national cricket team		
October 2024	(New Zealand) Amelia Kerr (2)	Women's national cricket team	Women's national cricket team		
November 2024	(England) Danni Wyatt-Hodge	Women's national cricket team	Women's national cricket team		
December 2024	(Australia) Annabel Sutherland (2)	Women's national cricket team	Women's national cricket team		
January 2025	(Australia) Beth Mooney	Women's national cricket team	Women's national cricket team		
February 2025	(Australia) Alana King	Women's national cricket team	Women's national cricket team		
March 2025	(Australia) Georgia Voll	Women's national cricket team	Women's national cricket team		
April 2025	(Scotland) Kathryn Bryce	Women's national cricket team	Women's national cricket team		
May 2025	(South Africa) Chloe Tryon	Women's national cricket team	Women's national cricket team		
June 2025	(Cricket West Indies) Hayley Matthews (4)	Women's national cricket team	Women's national cricket team		
July 2025	(England) Sophia Dunkley	Women's national cricket team	Women's national cricket team		
August 2025	(Ireland) Orla Prendergast	Women's national cricket team	Women's national cricket team		
September 2025	(India) Smriti Mandhana (2)	Women's national cricket team	Women's national cricket team		
October 2025	(South Africa) Laura Wolvaardt	Women's national cricket team	Women's national cricket team		
November 2025	(India) Shafali Verma	Women's national cricket team	Women's national cricket team		
December 2025	(South Africa) Laura Wolvaardt (2)	Women's national cricket team	Women's national cricket team		
January 2026	(Bangladesh) Sobhana Mostary	Women's national cricket team	Women's national cricket team		
February 2026	(India) Arundhati Reddy	Women's national cricket team	Women's national cricket team		
March 2026	(New Zealand) Amelia Kerr (3)	Women's national cricket team	Women's national cricket team		
April 2026	(South Africa) Laura Wolvaardt (3)	Women's national cricket team	Women's national cricket team		
May 2026	(England) Lauren Bell	Women's national cricket team	Women's national cricket team		
June 2026	(England) Danni Wyatt-Hodge (2)	Women's national cricket team	Women's national cricket team		
July 2026	(Cricket West Indies) Hayley Matthews (5)	Women's national cricket team	Women's national cricket team		
August 2026	(Isle of Man) Lucy Barnett	Women's national cricket team	Women's national cricket team		
September 2026	(India) Shafali Verma (2)	Women's national cricket team	Women's national cricket team		
October 2026	(India) Deepti Sharma (2)	Women's national cricket team	Women's national cricket team		

== See also ==
- ICC Awards
- ICC Awards of the Decade
