= Sarah Bryce =

Scottish cricketer (born 2000)

Personal information
- Full name: Sarah Jennifer Bryce
- Born: 8 January 2000 (age 26); Edinburgh, Scotland
- Batting: Right-handed
- Role: Wicket-keeper-batter
- Relatives: Kathryn Bryce (sister)

International information
- National side: Scotland
- ODI debut (cap 20): 17 October 2023 v Ireland
- Last ODI: 18 April 2025 v Ireland
- T20I debut (cap 3): 7 July 2018 v Uganda
- Last T20I: 30 November 2025 v Thailand
- T20I shirt no.: 6

Domestic team information
- Years: Team
- 2015–present: Scotland
- 2017–2019: Scotland A
- 2019: Nottinghamshire
- 2020–2023: Kent
- 2023–present: The Blaze
- 2021: Oval Invincibles
- 2022–present: Welsh Fire
- 2025: Delhi Capitals

Career statistics
Competition	WODI	WT20I	WLA	WT20
Matches	10	68	89	215
Runs scored	298	1,475	2,411	3,832
Batting average	29.80	28.92	30.13	26.98
100s/50s	0/2	0/4	1/17	1/16
Top score	84	67	136*	101*
Catches/stumpings	12/6	38/33	61/32	92/93
- Source: CricketArchive, 1 December 2025

Sarah Jennifer Bryce (born 8 January 2000) is a Scottish cricketer who plays for the national cricket team as a wicket-keeper-batter. At the domestic level, she plays for the Watsonian cricket club, for English teams The Blaze (formerly known as Lightning) and Kent, and for Welsh Fire.

Previously, she has taken the field for English teams Nottinghamshire and Oval Invincibles.

Bryce is best known as a batter who has represented Scotland at cricket since she was fifteen years old. However, she is also an accomplished wicket keeper. Her older sister, Kathryn, similarly plays international cricket for Scotland.

== Early life, family and education ==
Bryce was born in Edinburgh into a cricket-mad family. She and her sister developed an enthusiasm for all sports at an early age.

With the encouragement of their parents, Bryce and her sister played hockey and tennis, and her sister joined a cricket club and took the field for its girls 1st XI team. Bryce always went to the club cricket matches, started watching them, and eventually joined in.

According to Bryce, her father played a "huge role" in exposing her to cricket. She has said that he was full of enthusiasm for the game every time the family played it, either in the back garden or on the beach, or watched it on television. That enthusiasm fuelled her own love of the game.

The Bryce sisters also played girls' cricket at their school, George Watson's College. Bryce joined the girls' 1st XI team when she was about nine years old, and a boys XI when she was about 12. At that time, Edinburgh had no other girls' school teams, and so the GWC girls' 1st XI team played against many University teams, made up of similarly inexperienced players.

In 2015 and 2016, the GWC girls' 1st XI team, with the sisters as members, won the senior-level Women's Scottish Cup tournament; Bryce co-captained the team in the latter year.

Bryce also played for the GWC 1st XI hockey team. However:

"I always felt that I had more potential with cricket. I was involved in the U17 Scotland program from 11 years old and then made my debut for the women’s team when I was 15. I loved playing hockey at school but never played much club hockey. There was never an active decision choosing cricket over hockey, it just kind of happened."

When not playing sport, Bryce learned to play the violin and piano, and was also involved in several choirs, bands and orchestras. She particularly enjoyed piano playing as "... an opportunity to switch off from cricket."

Upon leaving school, Bryce did not consider becoming a professional cricketer to be a viable option, but wanted to take the game as far as she could. She therefore began a maths degree at Loughborough University in England, where her sister was already combining the study of sports science with playing cricket as a professional. She completed the degree in 2022.

Bryce and her sister have done more than just study at the same university and play the same sport. They have also usually played for the same team. Bryce's sister has described their relationship as 'probably quite unique'. Bryce herself has said:

"I think it's always like having a best friend with you all the time ...

... [as] Kathryn was older and better than me, I always wanted to be as good as her and beat her.

You always have that target of what you're striving to be like. That definitely pushed me on."

Bryce's sister has been Scotland's captain since April 2018, and Bryce is her deputy. However, the two sisters have also sometimes played for opposing teams, both in English domestic competitions, and in FairBreak Invitational T20 tournaments.

== Domestic career ==
=== Scotland ===
Bryce plays club cricket for the Watsonian Cricket Club, which is based in Edinburgh. She joined the club as a young girl, and played initially in a boys' team as there was no girls' team at that time.

As of 2020, Bryce was still playing club cricket alongside many of the same boys with whom she had played while growing up. She has said that the club, since even before it started fielding a women's team, has always been "hugely supportive" of her and her sister.

=== England: County cricket ===
Bryce made her English County cricket debut for the Scotland team in 2015, against Somerset. In the 2016 Women's County Championship, she played five matches for Scotland in Division 3, and made 72 runs at 14.40, with a top score of 22. During the 2016 Women's Twenty20 Cup, Bryce scored the most runs of any of Scotland's players, and recorded the fourth-highest aggregate in Division 3, as Scotland went undefeated in eight matches to win the Division and achieve promotion to Division 2. In those eight matches, she made 191 runs at 27.29, with a top score of 62.

In the 2017 Women's Twenty20 Cup, Bryce played eight Division 2 matches for Scotland A, and scored 96 runs at 19.20, with a top score of 37*.

During the 2018 Women's County Championship, Bryce, playing for Scotland in Division 3 Group A, scored the most runs of any player in the Group. In six matches, she made 258 runs at 64.50, with a top score of 81*, against Durham. In the 2018 Women's Twenty20 Cup, Bryce took the field for Scotland A in eight Division 2 matches, and made 203 runs at 40.60, with a top score of 53.

In 2019, Bryce played for Nottinghamshire in the Women's County Championship, and was the fourth-highest run-maker for the team. In six County Championship matches, she scored 175 runs, took 10 catches and achieved four stumpings. In that season's Women's County T20 Division 1, she played six further matches for Notts, scoring a total of 175 runs at 29.17, with a top score of 60. She also played six matches for Scotland A in the Women's County T20 Division 2, making 272 runs at 90.70, including 101* against Cheshire.

Bryce signed for Kent in 2020. By then, the final edition of the Women's County Championship had already taken place, and in 2020 the Women's Twenty20 Cup was not held, due to the COVID-19 pandemic. However, Kent did take part in the inaugural 50-over Women's London Championship (WLC), which was organised as "... the start of the county comeback." In two innings in the WLC, Bryce scored 78 runs at a strike rate of 93.98, including 51* in Kent's 10-wicket victory against Essex, which was enough for her to place fourth in the overall run chart, and be named as Kent's Batter of the Year and Women's Player of the Year.

The next season, 2021, Bryce played six matches for Kent in the South East Group of that year's Women's Twenty20 Cup, which Kent won. She scored an aggregate of 165 runs at 41.25, with two half centuries including 63* opening the batting against Middlesex, and was Kent's T20 Player of the Tournament. Additionally, she played in the 2021 WLC, from which Kent similarly emerged victorious. In the first of that season's WLC matches, she also captained Kent for the first time, in a 46-run win against Essex.

In April 2022, Bryce was awarded Kent Women Cap 55. However, she played only four matches for Kent in that season's Women's Twenty20 Cup, Group 6; she scored 74 runs in all at 24.67, with a highest score of 45* against Hampshire.

=== England: Regional cricket ===
In June 2020, Bryce and her sister were signed to play for the East Midlands Regional Hub, which was then based at Loughborough University and was due to field the team Lightning in England's new regionally based women's elite domestic competitions.

The Bryce sisters were recruited on the basis that they would be released for international duty with Scotland as required; both were already ranked in the world's top 20 in T20 internationals. Even so, neither of them was well known in England at that time; Bryce had never played in the then newly defunct Women's Cricket Super League regional franchise competition, and her sister had played in that league for just one season.

In that year's inaugural 50-over Rachael Heyhoe Flint Trophy, Bryce ended up as the competition's second-highest run scorer. with 395 runs in six games at 79.00. Her innings included four successive half centuries culminating in a share in a partnership with Bethan Ellis of 148 runs in 33 overs against Central Sparks (a new record partnership for any wicket in the RHF Trophy), and then, a week later, a List A career-best 136* in her team's final match, also against Central Sparks.

In December 2020, Lightning awarded the two sisters full-time contracts, in recognition of their highly successful performances that year; of the 41 players nationally who were given a full-time regional contract, they were the only ones from an ICC Associate member nation.

As was observed by Emerging Cricket at the time, the full time contracts not only "... supported [Bryce and her sister] financially...", but also gave them "... increased access and opportunities to develop their game as professional cricketers beyond their lives as students and without having to potentially sacrifice representing their nation to earn a living overseas."

In the ensuing season, 2021, Bryce played a much less prominent role in the second RHF Trophy, recording only 202 runs in seven matches at 28.85, with a highest score of 90. The following year, she made five appearances in the 2022 RHF Trophy and scored 115 runs at 23.

Late in 2022, the Lightning team parted company from Loughborough University, was rebadged as The Blaze, and was relocated to Trent Bridge, Nottingham, to become the East Midlands' new regional side. Both Bryce and her sister remained as contracted members of the squad.

=== England: The Hundred ===
In 2021, Bryce was drafted by Oval Invincibles ahead of the inaugural season of The Hundred. In her 10 matches for the competition-winning Invincibles team that season, including a match in which, unusually, her sister was in the opposing team, she scored only 32 runs in four innings with a top score of 29. On the other hand, she headed the overall figures for wicketkeeper dismissals by taking eight catches and completing three stumpings.

Bryce was then signed by the Welsh Fire for the 2022 tournament. Her batting performance in that year's Hundred turned out to be much more satisfactory; amongst her teammates, she finished with an aggregate second only to Tammy Beaumont and an average second only to Hayley Matthews. However, the team as a whole ended up coming last in the competition.

In May 2023, Bryce was re-signed by Welsh Fire ahead of the 2023 season.

=== Australia ===
In the WBBL|03 edition of the Women's Big Bash League Twenty20 competition, held during the 2017–18 Australian season, Bryce was the Associate Rookie for Hobart Hurricanes under the ICC Associate Rookie programme.

== International career ==
=== 2011–2017: Early years ===
Bryce became involved in Scotland's U17 program at the age of 11 years. A highlight of her U17 career for Scotland was an unbroken partnership of 336 with her sister, against Lincolnshire U17s in 2015. Bryce's contribution to that partnership was a score of 132*, her first ever century. Reminiscing to Female Cricket in 2020 about the occasion, she said:

"It was a really special day as both our parents were there watching. I've always really enjoyed batting with Kathryn as we know each other's games so well and are both pretty relaxed at the crease ... It was also my first century for Scotland U17s ... and it was nice to have Kathryn ... out there in the middle with me to share the moment ..."

Additionally, the partnership helped her to believe that if she kept working hard, it would be possible for her to make a debut for Scotland's senior women's team. Even though she had previously started training with the senior squad, she had found it overwhelming, and had felt that she was not good enough to be where she was.

Later in 2015, Bryce made her debut for the senior team, against Somerset in a county match. The same year, she was awarded her first international cap, against Papua New Guinea, in the ICC Women's World Twenty20 Qualifier in Thailand. During the latter match, which Scotland won by eight wickets with 26 balls remaining, she participated in two run outs of PNG players, but was not required to bat.

In July 2016, Bryce scored 109 runs and was "a very handy wicket-keeper" in the Europe qualifier tournament for the 2017 Women's Cricket World Cup in Essex, England. Only two teams, Scotland and the Netherlands, participated in the tournament. Scotland won all three of that tournament's matches, and thereby qualified for the 2017 Women's Cricket World Cup Qualifier, held in Sri Lanka in February 2017, in which Bryce also played. In the latter Qualifier, Scotland finished fourth in the five-team Group B.

=== 2018–2020: WT20I player ===
In June 2018, Bryce was selected in Scotland's squad ahead of the 2018 ICC Women's World Twenty20 Qualifier tournament. Her sister had recently been appointed as Scotland's new captain, replacing Abbi Aitken. She made her Women's Twenty20 International (WT20I) debut for Scotland in a match against Uganda in that tournament on 7 July 2018.

During that match, which was also Scotland's first ever WT20I, Bryce carried out a stumping, took a catch, and then top scored with 36* in Scotland's nine wicket victory. She later told Female Cricket that "[i]t was really special sharing that first T20I cap moment with the whole team." She also finished the tournament as Scotland's leading run-scorer, with 162 runs at an average of 81 across five matches, and was named by the International Cricket Council (ICC) as the rising star in Scotland's squad. Her individual achievements during the qualifier were summarised by the ICC as follows:

"In the first low-scoring match against Uganda, she made almost 77% of the team's total of 43, scoring 36*. She missed out on a fifty against Ireland, finishing unbeaten on 49 off 55 balls. In the semi-final against Bangladesh, she made 31 off 44. To go with that, she had five catches and four stumpings in the tournament."

On the other hand, as Bryce put it herself in an interview published in September 2020, "... it was definitely mixed emotions at the end of the tournament as we’d been one win away from going to the World Cup so that was disappointing."

Bryce's final international cricket activities for 2018 were as a member of the inaugural ICC Women's Global Development Squad, which played five matches in mid-July 2018 against English Super League teams; her sister was also a member of that squad.

In June 2019, Bryce was again selected in Scotland's squad, this time for the three team 2019 ICC Women's Qualifier Europe tournament in Spain. The other two competing teams were Germany and the Netherlands.

Both Scotland and the Netherlands won three of their four matches in that qualifier, with Bryce finishing sixth (and also third for Scotland) on the aggregate run scorers table. Bryce also featured prominently in Scotland's victory in its second match against the Netherlands; in a super over thriller, she and her sister combined to rack up an unbroken match-winning super over partnership.

The Netherlands ultimately won the qualifier by recording a better net run rate, but Scotland, as the host of the next qualifying stage of the 2022 Women's Cricket World Cup, also qualified for that stage. Bryce later told Female Cricket:

"It was a disappointing tournament for us on the whole – we didn’t achieve what we set out to do and we didn’t play our best cricket. I think we were able to learn quite a lot about ourselves though."

Scotland, the Netherlands, Ireland and Thailand then combined to participate in a quadrangular tournament in the Netherlands in August 2019, ahead of the 2019 ICC Women's World Twenty20 Qualifier tournament in Scotland. In the absence of her sister, who had commitments with Loughborough Lightning in the English domestic Super League competition, Bryce was appointed to captain the Scottish side.

After an initial loss to Thailand in the quadrangular's opening round of fixtures, Bryce led Scotland to four consecutive wins, including Scotland's first defeat of Ireland since 2011, and a victory against Thailand that ended that team's record-breaking 17 WT20I wins in a row.

Bryce later described the defeat of Ireland as her 'favourite match'. "It was only the second win against Ireland in our history, and the first time for all but one in our squad," she told Cricket Scotland in 2020. In Scotland's victory over Thailand, she scored 63*, including a four to seal the win off the final ball of the match. The following day, she made 41 in 19 balls in leading her team to another win, against the Netherlands. However, her top score of 49 for Scotland in its final match of the tournament, another contest against Ireland, was not enough to prevent a nine wicket loss.

In late August/early September 2019, the Scotland captaincy reverted to Bryce's sister, but Bryce was selected in Scotland's squad, for the 2019 ICC Women's World Twenty20 Qualifier. Bryce was the third highest run-scorer in that tournament, with 121 runs in five matches. She was also twice awarded Player of the Match, the first time for top scoring with 37* in 30 balls in a play-off semi-final against Namibia, and secondly for making 65 in 48 balls and completing four stumpings in Scotland's defeat of the Netherlands in the playoff for fifth place.

When the ICC Women's T20I Rankings were next updated on 10 September 2019, Bryce jumped five positions to no. 14 in the batters rankings, with a career-high rating of 605 points. In the 20 WT20I matches she had played up to that date, she had scored two half centuries, against Thailand and the Netherlands, respectively, had achieved an average of just under 40 at over a run a ball, and had claimed 14 catches and 15 stumpings.

In October 2019, Bryce was selected in the Women's Global Development Squad, ahead of a six-match series in Australia. The COVID-19 pandemic then intervened, and the Scotland team was left facing an uncertain future after several years of progress and rebuilding.

In November 2020, Bryce and her sister were both nominated for the ICC Women's Associate Cricketer of the Decade award. At the end of the following month, the ICC announced that her sister had won the award.

=== 2021–present ===
In April 2021, Bryce and her sister were members of an England academy team that played two pre-season T20s. The following month, they told ESPNcricinfo that it would be an agonising decision if they were asked to be part of England's national set-up.

Also in May 2021, Bryce played for Scotland in the team's post-COVID-19 return to international competition, in a bilateral series against Ireland at Stormont in Belfast. Scotland won the first of the four matches by 11 runs, with Bryce completing four stumpings. Bryce also bagged two stumpings and a catch in the third match, but Scotland ended up losing the series 1–3.

Bryce then played for Scotland in the 2021 ICC Women's T20 World Cup Europe Qualifier, which was originally scheduled to take place in Scotland, but later moved to the La Manga Club, Spain, due to the COVID-19 pandemic, and held in August 2021. Scotland won all four of its matches, and therefore qualified for the 2022 ICC Women's T20 World Cup Qualifier. Bryce's high point in the tournament was in her team's opening contest, against the Netherlands, in which she was Player of the Match for scoring 46 in 36 balls to guide Scotland to a six wicket victory. She also top scored in Scotland's 10 wicket win over Germany.

In January 2022, Bryce was part of Scotland's team in the five-team 2022 Commonwealth Games Cricket Qualifier tournament in Malaysia, and was the team's second highest run scorer, after her sister. Scotland won the first two of its four matches, lost the other two, and eventually finished third in a tournament in which only the first placed team qualified. Bryce's best performance in the qualifier was her top score of 29 for her team in its final-match loss to Bangladesh; earlier, she had scored a less important 30 runs in the team's first-up victory over Malaysia, in which her sister had been Player of the Match.

Bryce then stood in as captain for Scotland's next two matches, during a home bilateral series against Ireland in September 2022, as her sister was absent. Ireland won both matches; a third contest had to be abandoned due to rain.

Bryce's next appearances for Scotland were at the 2022 ICC Women's T20 World Cup Qualifier in Abu Dhabi, United Arab Emirates. In her five innings in that tournament, she made the fourth highest number of runs, with an aggregate of 152, just one run fewer than her sister. She was also awarded Player of the Match for scoring 45 in 32 balls in her team's victory over the United States, and top scored for the team with 49 in its loss to Ireland. Scotland finished the qualifier in sixth place.

In September 2024 she was named in the Scotland squad for the 2024 ICC Women's T20 World Cup.

Bryce was part of the Scotland squad for the 2025 Women's Cricket World Cup Qualifier in Pakistan in April 2025.

== FairBreak career ==
Bryce has played for the Spirit team in two FairBreak Invitational T20 competitions.

During the inaugural Invitational, held in Dubai in May 2022, she participated in all seven of Spirit's matches, made an aggregate of 145 runs at 20.71 with a top score of 39, took two catches and achieved four stumpings.

At the second tournament, in Hong Kong in April 2023, her fortunes were more mixed. Although in six matches for Spirit she scored only 45 runs at 7.50 with a highest score of 25, she also took six catches and made two stumpings.

== Playing style ==
Bryce is a wicket-keeper-batter who bats right-handed in the top order. She has told Female Cricket that she always fancied being a wicket-keeper; she appreciated that it was a "bit different" from the roles of every other player, and that wicket-keepers are "always in the game".

ESPNcricinfo observes that Bryce is a "... powerful cutter of the ball ... strong down the ground against spin ... [and] ... also a superb wicketkeeper ..." In May 2021, Matt Roller wrote for ESPNcricinfo that she:

"... is slightly taller [than her sister Kathryn] and particularly strong playing cut shots, though she uses her feet to hit spinners through mid-on and mid-off too. While [one of her former coaches] jokes that she would be well served by "having another word or two with the batters from behind the stumps", her ability with the gloves was demonstrated by four stumpings in Scotland's T20I against Ireland this week - the second consecutive T20I in which she had achieved the feat."

The Cricketer describes her as "a seasoned international ... [who] offers consistency and steadfastness", and also comments that she "... is highly respected by all her teammates not only for her cricketing ability, but also for the positivity and charisma she brings to her teams."

Bryce's role models, particularly in relation to wicket-keeping, are James Foster and Sarah Taylor. She also credits former Scotland international player Kari Carswell, who has coached and played alongside her, as having had a "massive impact".

== Off the field ==
Aside from cricket, Bryce continues to play the piano, and is also a golfer. While in quarantine ahead of the 2022 Commonwealth Games Cricket Qualifier in Malaysia, she passed the time by practising her putting.

== Honours ==
=== Team ===
- The Hundred champion: 2021
- Women's Twenty20 Cup South East Group champion: 2021

=== Individual ===
- Kent Women Player of the Year: 2020
- Kent Batter of the Year: 2020
- Kent Women's Twenty20 Cup Player of the Tournament: 2021
