= Saskia Horley =

Australian cricketer (born 2000)

Personal information
- Full name: Saskia Meg Horley
- Born: 23 February 2000 (age 26); St Leonards, New South Wales, Australia
- Batting: Right-handed
- Bowling: Right-arm off break
- Role: All-rounder

International information
- National side: Scotland
- ODI debut (cap 32): 12 April 2024 v Papua New Guinea
- Last ODI: 12 August 2024 v Netherlands
- T20I debut (cap 21): 5 September 2022 v Ireland
- Last T20I: 7 May 2024 v Sri Lanka
- T20I shirt no.: 13

Domestic team information
- Years: Team
- 2019/20–present: New South Wales
- 2019/20: Sydney Thunder
- 2022–present: Middlesex
- 2022/23–present: Sydney Thunder
- 2023: Sunrisers

Career statistics
Competition	WT20I	WLA	WT20
Matches	17	25	26
Runs scored	323	694	399
Batting average	20.18	7.50	23.11
100s/50s	0/2	1/5	0/2
Top score	61*	100	61*
Balls bowled	120	469	126
Wickets	6	13	6
Bowling average	23.66	27.38	25.33
5 wickets in innings	0	0	0
10 wickets in match	0	0	0
Best bowling	3/13	4/24	3/13
Catches/stumpings	1/–	1/–	1/–
- Source: CricketArchive, 30 September 2022

Saskia Meg Horley (born 23 February 2000) is an Australian cricketer who plays for Scotland, New South Wales and Sydney Thunder. She played in four matches for Sydney Thunder in the 2019–20 Women's Big Bash League season. In 2022, she played for Middlesex in the Women's Twenty20 Cup.

In August 2022, Horley was named in Scotland's squad for their series against Ireland in September 2022. She qualifies for Scotland through her mother, who was born in Edinburgh, and she holds a British passport. In March 2023, it was announced that she had signed for Sunrisers for the first five rounds of the 2023 Rachael Heyhoe Flint Trophy.

In September 2024 she was named in the Scotland squad for the 2024 ICC Women's T20 World Cup.

Horley was among the four player shortlist for the ICC Women's Emerging Cricketer of the Year 2024.
