= South Coast Sapphires =

Cricket team

- League: FairBreak Invitational T20

Personnel
- Captain: Sana Mir
- Coach: Shane Deitz

Team information
- City: South Coast
- Colours: Blue
- Founded: 2022

History
- FBI wins: 0

South Coast Sapphires are a women's cricket team that compete in the FairBreak Invitational T20. The team is geographically based in South Coast, Australia. The team was founded in 2022. They are currently captained by Sana Mir of Pakistan and coached by Shane Deitz.

== History ==
Sapphires were formed in January 2022 to compete in the inaugural edition of the FairBreak Invitational T20, a multi-national women's Twenty20 cricket tournament. This was the first time that the team participated in any cricket competition at a professional level. In May 2022, the tournament was sanctioned by the ICC. The team represents the South Coast region of New South Wales, Australia. The franchise is made up of some of the best women players as well as emerging players from different countries of the world.

South Coast Sapphires were captained by Pakistani cricketer Sana Mir, and coached by Mohtashim Rasheed in the 2022 edition. The side had a disappointing campaign, as they finished fifth in the league with just two wins from five matches. They played their first ever match on 5 May 2022, against the Tornadoes, which they lost by 17 runs.

Sapphires took part in the 2023 season under the leadership of Sana Mir, with Shane Deitz being named as the coach of the team. They again had a disappointing season, winning only one out of their five matches in the league stage. They acquired the last position in the tournament, by losing the fifth-place play-off against the Tornadoes by 55 runs.

== Current squad ==
Based on squad announced for the 2023 season.

Name	Nationality	Birth date	Batting style	Bowling style	Notes
Batters
Katie Mack	Australia	14 September 1993 (age 32)	Right-handed	Right-arm leg break	
Maryam Omar	Kuwait	8 March 1993 (age 32)	Right-handed	Right-arm off break	
Yee Shan To	Hong Kong	2 September 1993 (age 32)	Right-handed	–	
All-rounders
Sana Mir	Pakistan	5 January 1986 (age 39)	Right-handed	Right-arm off break	Captain
Jivana Aras	United States	27 March 2004 (age 21)	Left-handed	Right-arm medium	
Erin Burns	Australia	22 June 1988 (age 37)	Right-handed	Right-arm off break	
Kary Chan	Hong Kong	13 March 1997 (age 28)	Left-handed	Left-arm wrist spin	
Aditiba Chudasama	United States	26 May 2006 (age 19)	Right-handed	Right-arm off break	
Sibona Jimmy	Papua New Guinea	29 December 1992 (age 32)	Left-handed	Right-arm off break	
Geetika Kodali	United States	7 June 2004 (age 21)	Right-handed	Right-arm medium	
Gaby Lewis	Ireland	27 March 2001 (age 24)	Right-handed	Right-arm leg break	
Wicket-keepers
Babette de Leede	Netherlands	8 October 1999 (age 25)	Right-handed	–	
Bowlers
Tash Farrant	England	29 May 1996 (age 29)	Left-handed	Left-arm fast medium	
Shabnim Ismail	South Africa	5 October 1988 (age 36)	Left-handed	Right-arm fast	
Katherine Sciver-Brunt	England	2 July 1985 (age 40)	Right-handed	Right-arm medium fast	

== Coaching staff ==
The following coaching panel was formed ahead of the 2023 season.

Position	Name
Team manager	(Scotland) Sue Strachan
Head coach	(Australia) Shane Deitz
Assistant coach	(Australia) Hannah Trethewy
Physiotherapist	(Netherlands) Lara Nicod

== Seasons ==
Season	League standings							Position	Notes	Ref
Season	P	W	L	T	A	NRR	Pts	Position	Notes	Ref
2022	5	2	3	0	0	–0.300	8	5th		
2023	5	1	4	0	0	–1.789	5	6th		
