= 2023 FairBreak Invitational T20 USA =

Invitational women's cricket competition

- Dates: 15 September 2023 – 30 September 2023
- Administrator(s): FairBreak Global; USA Cricket
- Cricket format: Twenty20
- Tournament format(s): Round-robin and knockouts
- Participants: 6

The 2023 FairBreak Invitational T20 USA was a women's Twenty20 cricket competition that was due to be held between 15 and 30 September 2023 in Houston, Texas, USA.

The tournament, sanctioned by the ICC, was to have been privately run in collaboration with USA Cricket by FairBreak Global, a company that aims to promote gender equality.

In June 2023, FairBreak Global announced that it had decided to postpone the event until 2024.
