= 2022 FairBreak Invitational T20 =

Invitational women's cricket competition

- Dates: 4 – 15 May 2022
- Administrator(s): FairBreak Global; Cricket Hong Kong
- Cricket format: Twenty20
- Tournament format(s): Round-robin and knockouts
- Champions: Tornadoes (1st title)
- Participants: 6
- Matches: 19
- Most runs: Chamari Athapaththu (313)
- Most wickets: Sophie Ecclestone (17)

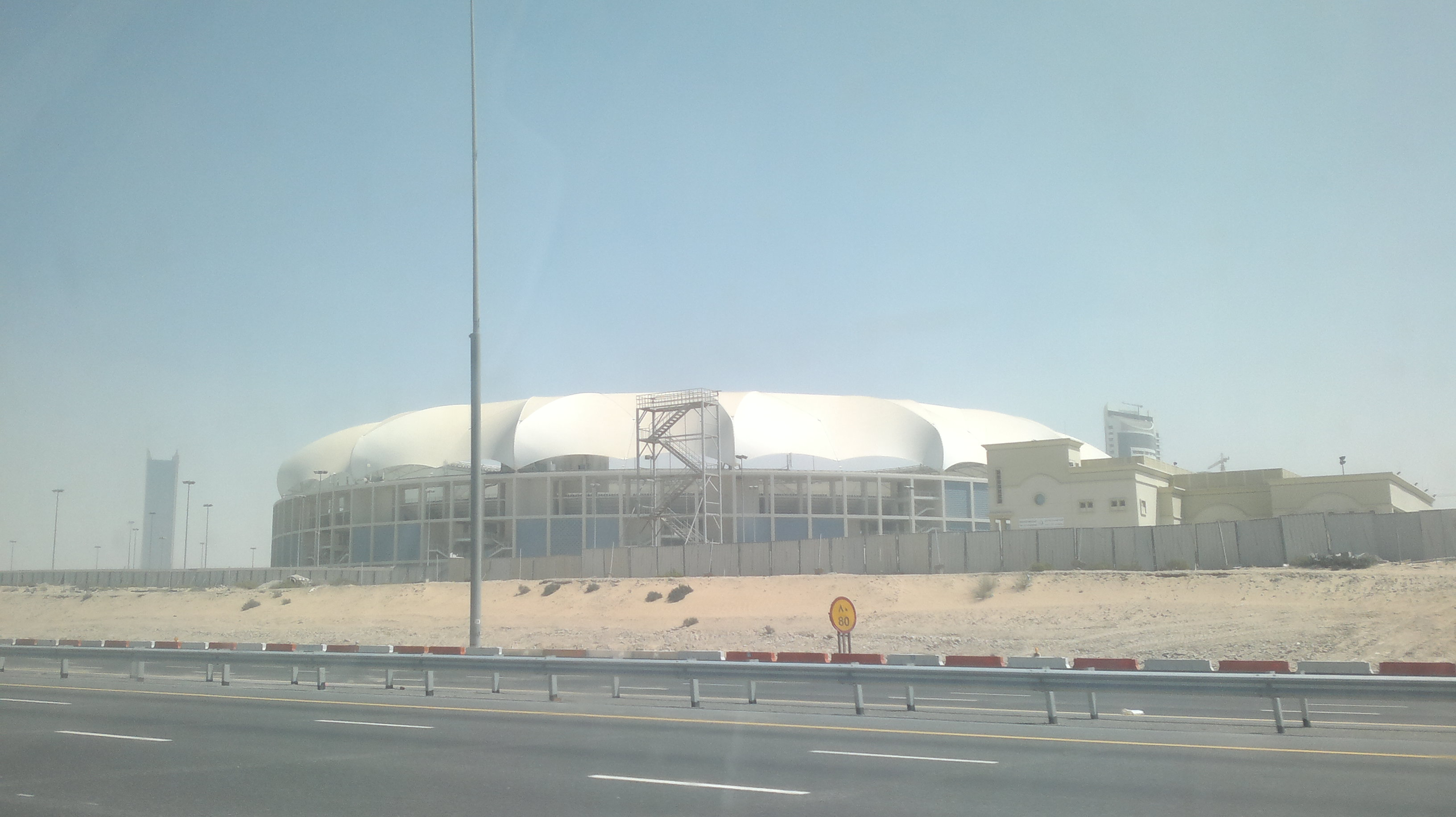
All matches took place at the Dubai International Cricket Stadium.

The 2022 FairBreak Invitational T20 was a women's Twenty20 cricket competition which took place from 4 to 15 May 2022 in Dubai. The tournament, sanctioned by the ICC, was privately-run by FairBreak Global, a company that aims to promote gender equality. Players from 35 countries were spread across six teams. The tournament was won by Tornadoes, who beat Falcons in the final by 8 wickets.

== Competition format ==
Each team played every other team once, with two matches taking place per day. The top four teams in the group advanced to the semi-finals. All matches took place at the Dubai International Cricket Stadium.

The group worked on a points system with positions being based on the total points. Points were awarded as follows:

Win: 3 points.
Tie: 1 point.
Loss: 0 points.
Abandoned/No Result: 1 point.
Bonus Point: 1 point awarded to the team with the highest score after 10 overs of the batting innings.

== Teams ==
Barmy Army Coach: Lydia Greenway	Falcons Coach: Joanne Broadbent	South Coast Sapphires Coach: Mohtashim Rasheed
(England) Heather Knight (c); (Bangladesh) Rumana Ahmed; (Cricket West Indies) Shemaine Campbelle; (Brazil) Laura Cardoso; (Nepal) Rubina Chhetry; (Cricket West Indies) Deandra Dottin; (United Arab Emirates) Kavisha Egodage; (Rwanda) Henriette Ishimwe; (Brazil) Roberta Moretti Avery; (United States) Tara Norris; (Hong Kong) Iqra Sahar; (Pakistan) Fatima Sana; (Vanuatu) Selina Solman; (Hong Kong) Ruchitha Venkatesh; (South Africa) Laura Wolvaardt	(New Zealand) Suzie Bates (c); (Bangladesh) Jahanara Alam; (Papua New Guinea) Kaia Arua; (Sri Lanka) Chamari Athapaththu; (Cricket West Indies) Britney Cooper; (Germany) Christina Gough; (Bhutan) Anju Gurung; (Hong Kong) Mariko Hill; (South Africa) Marizanne Kapp; (Thailand) Nannapat Koncharoenkai; (Hong Kong) Marina Lamplough; (United Arab Emirates) Theertha Satish; (Sweden) Gunjan Shukla; (Thailand) Sornnarin Tippoch; (England) Danni Wyatt	(Pakistan) Sana Mir (c); (Australia) Jade Allen; (United States) Shebani Bhaskar; (Hong Kong) Kary Chan; (Netherlands) Babette de Leede; (England) Tash Farrant; (Ireland) Kim Garth; (Australia) Grace Harris; (South Africa) Shabnim Ismail; (United States) Geetika Kodali; (Hong Kong) Emma Lai; (Ireland) Gaby Lewis; (Philippines) Christine Lovino; (Kuwait) Maryam Omar; (Australia) Elyse Villani
Spirit Coach: Erin Osborne	Tornadoes Coach: Anju Jain	Warriors Coach: Julia Price
(Australia) Nicola Carey (c); (Thailand) Nattaya Boochatham; (Scotland) Sarah Bryce; (Hong Kong) Betty Chan; (Thailand) Natthakan Chantam; (Hong Kong) Yasmin Daswani; (Germany) Anuradha Doddaballapur; (England) Sophia Dunkley; (England) Sophie Ecclestone; (Singapore) Diviya G K; (South Africa) Ayabonga Khaka; (Tanzania) Fatuma Kibasu; (Pakistan) Bismah Maroof; (Japan) Shizuka Miyaji; (United Arab Emirates) Chaya Mughal	(Cricket West Indies) Stafanie Taylor (c); (Pakistan) Diana Baig; (Hong Kong) Maryam Bibi; (New Zealand) Sophie Devine; (Malaysia) Winifred Duraisingam; (Netherlands) Sterre Kalis; (South Africa) Suné Luus; (Nepal) Sita Magar; (New Zealand) Katey Martin; (Hong Kong) Natasha Miles; (Zimbabwe) Mary-Anne Musonda; (Pakistan) Aliya Riaz; (Canada) Divya Saxena; (Thailand) Chanida Sutthiruang; (Austria) Andrea-Mae Zepeda	(United States) Sindhu Sriharsha (c); (Philippines) Jennifer Alumbro; (Scotland) Kathryn Bryce; (Cricket West Indies) Shamilia Connell; (South Africa) Mignon du Preez; (Namibia) Yasmeen Khan; (Argentina) Mariana Martinez; (Cricket West Indies) Hayley Matthews; (Botswana) Shameelah Mosweu; (United Arab Emirates) Esha Oza; (Hong Kong) Bella Poon; (Sri Lanka) Udeshika Prabodani; (Ireland) Celeste Raack; (Australia) Georgia Redmayne; (Hong Kong) Shanzeen Shahzad

== Points table ==
Team	Pld	W	L	T	A	BP	NRR	Pts
Spirit (Q)	5	4	1	0	0	3	+1.740	15
Barmy Army (Q)	5	3	2	0	0	2	+0.132	11
Tornadoes (Q)	5	3	2	0	0	2	–0.706	11
Falcons (Q)	5	2	3	0	0	4	–0.317	10
South Coast Sapphires	5	2	3	0	0	2	–0.300	8
Warriors	5	1	4	0	0	2	–0.575	5

Advanced to knockout stages

Source: ESPNcricinfo

== Fixtures ==
=== Group stage ===
4 May 2022
20:00 (D/N)
Scorecard

Warriors; 177/2 (20 overs)	v	Falcons; 178/2 (18.4 overs)
Georgia Redmayne 80* (61); Mariko Hill 1/23 (2 overs)		Chamari Athapaththu 107* (55); Hayley Matthews 1/23 (4 overs)

Falcons won by 8 wickets
Dubai International Cricket Stadium, Dubai
Umpires: Kim Cotton and Lauren Agenbag
Player of the match: Chamari Athapaththu (Falcons)

- Falcons won the toss and elected to field.
- Points: Falcons 4, Warriors 0

5 May 2022
16:00 (D/N)
Scorecard

Tornadoes; 119/7 (20 overs)	v	South Coast Sapphires; 102/8 (20 overs)
Sterre Kalis 32 (29); Shabnim Ismail 3/20 (4 overs)		Babette de Leede 24 (14); Diana Baig 2/15 (4 overs)

Tornadoes won by 17 runs
Dubai International Cricket Stadium, Dubai
Umpires: Tabarak Dar and Jasmine Naeem
Player of the match: Sterre Kalis (Tornadoes)

- South Coast Sapphires won the toss and elected to field.
- Points: Tornadoes 4, South Coast Sapphires 0

5 May 2022
20:00 (D/N)
Scorecard

Barmy Army; 125/6 (20 overs)	v	Spirit; 75/9 (20 overs)
Laura Wolvaardt 38 (33); Sophie Ecclestone 3/15 (4 overs)		Natthakan Chantham 21* (29); Tara Norris 2/17 (4 overs)

Barmy Army won by 50 runs
Dubai International Cricket Stadium, Dubai
Umpires: Claire Polosak and John Prakash
Player of the match: Heather Knight (Barmy Army)

- Spirit won the toss and elected to field.
- Points: Barmy Army 4, Spirit 0

6 May 2022
16:00 (D/N)
Scorecard

Barmy Army; 152/3 (20 overs)	v	Falcons; 156/2 (17.3 overs)
Deandra Dottin 80* (59); Gunjan Shukla 1/12 (2 overs)		Danni Wyatt 76* (49); Ruchitha Venkatesh 1/21 (2 overs)

Falcons won by 8 wickets
Dubai International Cricket Stadium, Dubai
Umpires: Akbar Ali and Simon Taufel
Player of the match: Danni Wyatt (Falcons)

- Falcons won the toss and elected to field.
- Points: Falcons 4, Barmy Army 0

6 May 2022
20:00 (D/N)
Scorecard

Tornadoes; 152/3 (20 overs)	v	Warriors; 139/6 (20 overs)
Sterre Kalis 58 (57); Hayley Matthews 2/33 (4 overs)		Georgia Redmayne 48 (46); Winifred Duraisingam 3/24 (4 overs)

Tornadoes won by 13 runs
Dubai International Cricket Stadium, Dubai
Umpires: John Prakash and Shubhda Bhosle
Player of the match: Winifred Duraisingam (Tornadoes)

- Warriors won the toss and elected to field.
- Points: Tornadoes 3, Warriors 1

7 May 2022
16:00 (D/N)
Scorecard

Spirit; 147/3 (20 overs)	v	Falcons; 120/9 (20 overs)
Sophia Dunkley 51 (30); Chamari Athapaththu 1/17 (4 overs)		Chamari Athapaththu 42 (28); Shizuka Miyaji 4/18 (4 overs)

Spirit won by 27 runs
Dubai International Cricket Stadium, Dubai
Umpires: Jacqueline Williams and Tabarak Dar
Player of the match: Shizuka Miyaji (Spirit)

- Falcons won the toss and elected to field.
- Points: Spirit 3, Falcons 1

7 May 2022
20:00 (D/N)
Scorecard

Warriors; 129/5 (20 overs)	v	South Coast Sapphires; 133/0 (17.5 overs)
Georgia Redmayne 33 (39); Geetika Kodali 2/10 (2 overs)		Elyse Villani 62* (51)

South Coast Sapphires won by 10 wickets
Dubai International Cricket Stadium, Dubai
Umpires: Jasmine Naeem and Kim Cotton
Player of the match: Gaby Lewis (South Coast Sapphires)

- Warriors won the toss and elected to bat.
- Points: South Coast Sapphires 4, Warriors 0

8 May 2022
16:00 (D/N)
Scorecard

Spirit; 156/4 (20 overs)	v	South Coast Sapphires; 101 (19.4 overs)
Nicola Carey 70 (43); Shabnim Ismail 1/14 (4 overs)		Jade Allen 33* (41); Ayabonga Khaka 5/9 (4 overs)

Spirit won by 55 runs
Dubai International Cricket Stadium, Dubai
Umpires: Claire Polosak and Simon Taufel
Player of the match: Ayabonga Khaka (Spirit)

- Spirit won the toss and elected to bat.
- Points: Spirit 4, South Coast Sapphires 0

8 May 2022
20:00 (D/N)
Scorecard

Tornadoes; 150/2 (20 overs)	v	Barmy Army; 153/2 (15.5 overs)
Stafanie Taylor 78* (54)		Deandra Dottin 56* (40); Sita Magar 1/24 (2 overs)

Barmy Army won by 8 wickets
Dubai International Cricket Stadium, Dubai
Umpires: Jasmine Naeem and Shivani Mishra
Player of the match: Stafanie Taylor (Tornadoes)

- Barmy Army won the toss and elected to field.
- Points: Barmy Army 4, Tornadoes 0

10 May 2022
16:00 (D/N)
Scorecard

Spirit; 167/4 (20 overs)	v	Warriors; 100/8 (20 overs)
Natthakan Chantham 72 (57); Esha Oza 1/22 (4 overs)		Yasmeen Khan 27 (28); Sophie Ecclestone 2/8 (3 overs)

Spirit won by 67 runs
Dubai International Cricket Stadium, Dubai
Umpires: Shivani Mishra and Shubhda Bhosle
Player of the match: Natthakan Chantham (Spirit)

- Warriors won the toss and elected to field.
- Points: Spirit 4, Warriors 0

10 May 2022
20:00 (D/N)
Scorecard

Barmy Army; 148/8 (20 overs)	v	South Coast Sapphires; 142/7 (20 overs)
Laura Wolvaardt 65 (45); Grace Harris 5/22 (4 overs)		Grace Harris 31 (20); Rumana Ahmed 3/22 (4 overs)

Barmy Army won by 6 runs
Dubai International Cricket Stadium, Dubai
Umpires: Jacqueline Williams and Jasmine Naeem
Player of the match: Grace Harris (South Coast Sapphires)

- South Coast Sapphires won the toss and elected to field.
- Points: Barmy Army 3, South Coast Sapphires 1

11 May 2022
16:00 (D/N)
Scorecard

South Coast Sapphires; 152/3 (20 overs)	v	Falcons; 122/7 (20 overs)
Elyse Villani 71* (54); Chamari Athapaththu 1/23 (2 overs)		Chamari Athapaththu 30 (34); Sana Mir 4/15 (4 overs)

South Coast Sapphires won by 30 runs
Dubai International Cricket Stadium, Dubai
Umpires: Akbar Ali and Lauren Agenbag
Player of the match: Babette de Leede (South Coast Sapphires)

- Falcons won the toss and elected to field.
- Points: South Coast Sapphires 3, Falcons 1

11 May 2022
20:00 (D/N)
Scorecard

Spirit; 156/4 (20 overs)	v	Tornadoes; 81 (16.1 overs)
Nicola Carey 53* (26); Chanida Sutthiruang 1/21 (2 overs)		Suné Luus 34 (33); Sophie Ecclestone 5/8 (3.1 overs)

Spirit won by 75 runs
Dubai International Cricket Stadium, Dubai
Umpires: Jacqueline Williams and Kim Cotton
Player of the match: Sophie Ecclestone (Spirit)

- Tornadoes won the toss and elected to field.
- Points: Spirit 4, Tornadoes 0

12 May 2022
16:00 (D/N)
Scorecard

Falcons; 138/4 (20 overs)	v	Tornadoes; 141/3 (19.2 overs)
Suzie Bates 41* (31); Winifred Duraisingam 1/17 (3 overs)		Sophie Devine 52 (29); Gunjan Shukla 2/32 (4 overs)

Tornadoes won by 7 wickets
Dubai International Cricket Stadium, Dubai
Umpires: Akbar Ali and Claire Polosak
Player of the match: Sophie Devine (Tornadoes)

- Falcons won the toss and elected to bat.
- Points: Tornadoes 4, Falcons 0

12 May 2022
20:00 (D/N)
Scorecard

Warriors; 156/6 (20 overs)	v	Barmy Army; 102/8 (20 overs)
Mignon du Preez 75* (54); Deandra Dottin 1/11 (2 overs)		Fatima Sana 34 (34); Hayley Matthews 2/5 (3 overs)

Warriors won by 54 runs
Dubai International Cricket Stadium, Dubai
Umpires: Jacqueline Williams and Shivani Mishra
Player of the match: Mignon du Preez (Warriors)

- Barmy Army won the toss and elected to field.
- Points: Warriors 4, Barmy Army 0

=== Knockout stages ===
==== Semi-finals ====
14 May 2022
16:00 (D/N)
Scorecard

Falcons; 172/5 (20 overs)	v	Spirit; 147/5 (20 overs)
Danni Wyatt 83 (48); Nicola Carey 2/30 (4 overs)		Sophia Dunkley 45 (30); Anju Gurung 2/26 (4 overs)

Falcons won by 25 runs
Dubai International Cricket Stadium, Dubai
Umpires: Akbar Ali and Claire Polosak
Player of the match: Danni Wyatt (Falcons)

- Falcons won the toss and elected to bat.

14 May 2022
20:00 (D/N)
Scorecard

Barmy Army; 141/6 (20 overs)	v	Tornadoes; 142/6 (19.4 overs)
Rumana Ahmed 35* (15); Diana Baig 2/32 (4 overs)		Sophie Devine 37 (26); Rumana Ahmed 3/23 (4 overs)

Tornadoes won by 4 wickets
Dubai International Cricket Stadium, Dubai
Umpires: Jasmine Naeem and Tabarak Dar
Player of the match: Rumana Ahmed (Barmy Army)

- Tornadoes won the toss and elected to field.

==== Third-place play-off ====
15 May 2022
16:00 (D/N)
Scorecard

Barmy Army; 182/6 (20 overs)	v	Spirit; 183/4 (18.5 overs)
Deandra Dottin 111 (53); Sophie Ecclestone 3/24 (4 overs)		Sophia Dunkley 123* (73); Tara Norris 2/32 (4 overs)

Spirit won by 6 wickets
Dubai International Cricket Stadium, Dubai
Umpires: Lauren Agenbag and Tabarak Dar
Player of the match: Sophia Dunkley (Spirit)

- Barmy Army won the toss and elected to bat.

==== Final ====
15 May 2022
20:00 (D/N)
Scorecard

Falcons; 151/4 (20 overs)	v	Tornadoes; 152/2 (19.1 overs)
Marizanne Kapp 67* (37); Chanida Sutthiruang 2/19 (3 overs)		Sophie Devine 51 (35); Sornnarin Tippoch 1/30 (4 overs)

Tornadoes won by 8 wickets
Dubai International Cricket Stadium, Dubai
Umpires: Jacqueline Williams and Kim Cotton
Player of the match: Marizanne Kapp (Falcons)

- Tornadoes won the toss and elected to field.

== Statistics ==
=== Most runs ===
Player	Team	Matches	Innings	Runs	Average	HS	100s	50s
(Sri Lanka) Chamari Athapaththu	Falcons	7	7	313	52.16	107*	1	1
(Cricket West Indies) Deandra Dottin	Barmy Army	7	6	289	72.25	111	1	2
(England) Sophia Dunkley	Spirit	7	7	263	43.83	123*	1	1
(Netherlands) Sterre Kalis	Tornadoes	7	7	225	32.14	58	0	2
(England) Danni Wyatt	Falcons	6	6	216	43.20	83	0	2

Source: ESPNcricinfo

=== Most wickets ===
Player	Team	Overs	Wickets	Average	BBI	5w
(England) Sophie Ecclestone	Spirit	24.5	17	7.64	5/8	1
(South Africa) Ayabonga Khaka	Spirit	25.0	9	14.44	5/9	1
(Australia) Grace Harris	South Coast Sapphires	15.0	7	14.85	5/22	1
(Bangladesh) Rumana Ahmed	Barmy Army	23.0	7	20.00	3/22	0
(Malaysia) Winifred Duraisingam	Tornadoes	25.0	7	24.42	3/24	0

Source: ESPNcricinfo
