= Scotland women's cricket team in Ireland in 2021 =

International cricket tour

| | Ireland women | Scotland women |
- Dates: 24 – 27 May 2021
| Captains | Laura Delany | Kathryn Bryce |

Twenty20 International series
- Results: Ireland women won the 4-match series 3–1
| Most runs | Gaby Lewis (116) | Kathryn Bryce (96) |
| Most wickets | Leah Paul (9) | Katie McGill (7) |
- Player of the series: Leah Paul (Ire)

The Ireland women's cricket team played the Scotland women's cricket team in May 2021. The tour consisted of four Women's Twenty20 International (WT20I) matches. The teams last played international cricket during the 2019 ICC Women's World Twenty20 Qualifier in August and September 2019. The matches all took place at Stormont in Belfast, and was the first time since 1997 that women's international cricket was played at the venue.

The series was originally scheduled to start on 23 May 2021. However, the opening fixture was abandoned due to rain and moved back to the reserve day.

Scotland won the first match by eleven runs to take a 1–0 lead in the series. Ireland then won the next two matches, by 61 runs and 41 runs respectively, to go 2–1 up with one match left to play. Ireland won the final match by six wickets to win the series 3–1. Ireland's Leah Paul was named player of the series.

== Squads ==
| Ireland | Scotland |
|---|---|
| Laura Delany (c); Ava Canning; Rachel Delaney; Georgina Dempsey; Amy Hunter; Shauna Kavanagh; Gaby Lewis; Jane Maguire; Lara Maritz; Cara Murray; Leah Paul; Orla Prendergast; Celeste Raack; Jenny Sparrow; Rebecca Stokell | Kathryn Bryce (c); Sarah Bryce (vc); Abbi Aitken-Drummond; Priyanaz Chatterji; Ikra Farooq; Katherine Fraser; Becky Glen; Samantha Haggo; Lorna Jack; Ailsa Lister; Abtaha Maqsood; Megan McColl; Katie McGill; Ellen Watson |

== WT20I series ==
=== 1st WT20I ===
24 May 2021
11:00
Scorecard

| Scotland; 87/9 (20 overs) | v | Ireland; 76 (19.3 overs) |
| Katie McGill 20 (22); Celeste Raack 3/15 (4 overs) | | Leah Paul 18 (21); Katie McGill 3/18 (4 overs) |

Scotland Women won by 11 runs
Stormont, Belfast
Umpires: Jareth McCready (Ire) and Alan Neill (Ire)
Player of the match: Katie McGill (Sco)

- Scotland Women won the toss and elected to bat.
- Ava Canning, Amy Hunter (Ire) and Ailsa Lister (Sco) all made their WT20I debuts.

=== 2nd WT20I ===
25 May 2021
13:00
Scorecard

| Ireland; 137/4 (20 overs) | v | Scotland; 76 (16.4 overs) |
| Gaby Lewis 47 (39); Katie McGill 2/26 (4 overs) | | Katie McGill 19 (23); Leah Paul 4/16 (4 overs) |

Ireland Women won by 61 runs
Stormont, Belfast
Umpires: Jareth McCready (Ire) and Alan Neill (Ire)
Player of the match: Gaby Lewis (Ire)

- Ireland Women won the toss and elected to bat.

=== 3rd WT20I ===
26 May 2021
13:00
Scorecard

| Ireland; 134/8 (20 overs) | v | Scotland; 93 (19 overs) |
| Shauna Kavanagh 37 (30); Megan McColl 2/16 (2 overs) | | Kathryn Bryce 45* (42); Cara Murray 3/18 (3 overs) |

Ireland Women won by 41 runs
Stormont, Belfast
Umpires: Roland Black (Ire) and Alan Neill (Ire)
Player of the match: Orla Prendergast (Ire)

- Ireland Women won the toss and elected to bat.

=== 4th WT20I ===
27 May 2021
11:00
Scorecard

| Scotland; 99/7 (20 overs) | v | Ireland; 101/4 (13.5 overs) |
| Megan McColl 30* (29); Leah Paul 3/12 (3 overs) | | Gaby Lewis 49 (40); Kathryn Bryce 2/13 (3 overs) |

Ireland Women won by 6 wickets
Stormont, Belfast
Umpires: Roland Black (Ire) and Alan Neill (Ire)
Player of the match: Gaby Lewis (Ire)

- Scotland Women won the toss and elected to bat.
- Georgina Dempsey (Ire) made her WT20I debut.
