= Ireland women's cricket team in Scotland in 2022 =

International cricket tour

	Scotland women	Ireland women
- Dates: 5 – 8 September 2022
Captains	Kathryn Bryce (Note: Sarah Bryce captained Scotland Women in the first and second WT20Is.)	Laura Delany

Twenty20 International series
- Results: Ireland women won the 3-match series 2–0
Most runs	Saskia Horley (96)	Orla Prendergast (92)
Most wickets	Katherine Fraser (2)	Arlene Kelly (3)

The Ireland women's cricket team toured Scotland in September 2022 to play three Women's Twenty20 International (WT20I) matches. This was the first time that The Grange Club in Edinburgh hosted a full women's international match.

Sarah Bryce captained Scotland in the first two matches of the series, in the absence of her older sister Kathryn. Ireland won the first match by 8 wickets, Orla Prendergast top-scoring with an unbeaten 75. Rain caused a delayed start to the second game and returned after 5 overs of Ireland's run chase, resulting in a 16-run DLS win for the visitors who clinched the series. The third game was abandoned due to rain, meaning that Ireland won the series 2–0.

== Squads ==
Scotland	Ireland
Kathryn Bryce (c); Sarah Bryce (vc, wk); Abbi Aitken-Drummond; Olivia Bell; Priyanaz Chatterji; Katherine Fraser; Saskia Horley; Lorna Jack; Ailsa Lister; Abtaha Maqsood; Megan McColl; Katie McGill; Hannah Rainey; Rachel Slater; Ellen Watson	Laura Delany (c); Georgina Dempsey; Amy Hunter; Shauna Kavanagh; Arlene Kelly; Gaby Lewis; Sophie MacMahon; Jane Maguire; Cara Murray; Leah Paul; Orla Prendergast; Eimear Richardson; Rebecca Stokell; Mary Waldron (wk)

== WT20I series ==
=== 1st WT20I ===
5 September 2022
13:00
Scorecard

Scotland; 133/6 (20 overs)	v	Ireland; 137/2 (16.2 overs)
Saskia Horley 52 (42); Arlene Kelly 2/12 (4 overs)		Orla Prendergast 75* (45); Katherine Fraser 2/31 (4 overs)

Ireland Women won by 8 wickets
The Grange Club, Edinburgh
Umpires: David McLean (Sco) and Sue Redfern (Eng)
Player of the match: Orla Prendergast (Ire)

- Ireland Women won the toss and elected to field.
- Saskia Horley (Sco) made her WT20I debut.

=== 2nd WT20I ===
6 September 2022
13:00
Scorecard

Scotland; 126/8 (20 overs)	v	Ireland; 44/1 (5 overs)
Saskia Horley 44 (33); Cara Murray 2/20 (3 overs)		Orla Prendergast 17* (8); Rachel Slater 1/14 (2 overs)

Ireland Women won by 16 runs (DLS method)
The Grange Club, Edinburgh
Umpires: David McLean (Sco) and Sue Redfern (Eng)
Player of the match: Saskia Horley (Sco)

- Ireland Women won the toss and elected to field.
- No further play was possible due to rain.

=== 3rd WT20I ===
8 September 2022
13:00
Scorecard

Scotland	v	Ireland

Match abandoned
The Grange Club, Edinburgh
Umpires: David McLean (Sco) and Sue Redfern (Eng)

- No toss.
- No play was possible due to rain.
