= FairBreak Invitational T20 =

Women's cricket tournament

- Administrator: FairBreak Global; Cricket Hong Kong
- Format: Twenty20
- First edition: 2022
- Latest edition: 2023 (Hong Kong)
- Next edition: 2023 (USA)
- Tournament format: Round-robin and knockouts
- Number of teams: 6
- Current champion: Warriors (1st title)
- Most successful: Tornadoes (1 title); Warriors (1 title)
- Website: FairBreak

The FairBreak Invitational T20 is a women's Twenty20 cricket competition. The tournament, sanctioned by the ICC, is privately-run by FairBreak Global, a company that aims to promote gender equality. Players from around the world play in the tournament, spread across six teams.

The inaugural tournament took place in Dubai in 2022. The second edition of the tournament took place in April 2023, in Hong Kong, with a further tournament scheduled in 2023 in the USA.

== History ==
The tournament was set up by FairBreak Global, with the aim of improving differences in pay, quality of play, and opportunity between men and women in cricket. Starting in 2013, FairBreak teams were fielded in exhibition matches. The first FairBreak Invitational T20 took place in 2022: run in conjunction with Cricket Hong Kong, the tournament was originally scheduled to take place in Hong Kong, but was moved to Dubai due to COVID-19 restrictions in Hong Kong. The inaugural tournament saw players from 35 countries take part, spread across six teams. The tournament was won by Tornadoes, who beat Falcons in the final by 8 wickets.

The second edition of the tournament took place in April 2023, at Kowloon Cricket Club in Hong Kong, which was won by Warriors. The third edition of the tournament is due to take place in September 2023, in Houston, Texas, USA.

== Teams ==
Team	Titles	Runners-up
Barmy Army	0	0
Falcons	0	2
South Coast Sapphires	0	0
Spirit	0	0
Tornadoes	1	0
Warriors	1	0

== Tournament results ==
Year	Hosts	Final			Leading run-scorer	Leading wicket-taker	Notes
Year	Hosts	Winners	Result	Runners-up	Leading run-scorer	Leading wicket-taker	Notes
2022	(United Arab Emirates) Dubai	Tornadoes; 152/2 (19.1 overs)	Tornadoes won by 8 wickets Scorecard	Falcons; 151/4 (20 overs)	Chamari Athapaththu (Falcons) 313	Sophie Ecclestone (Spirit) 17	
2023	Hong Kong	Warriors; 230/4 (20 overs)	Warriors won by 93 runs Scorecard	Falcons; 137/8 (20 overs)	Chamari Athapaththu (Falcons) 281	Kathryn Bryce (Falcons) 13	
2023	(United States) Houston	To be decided					

== Broadcasters ==
Territory	Years	Channels & Live Streaming
Australia	(2023–present)	Fox Cricket
Bangladesh	(2023–present)	Sony Sports Network
Bhutan	(2023–present)	Sony Sports Network
Caribbean	(2023–present)	SportsMax
Canada	(2023–present)	Willow TV
Hong Kong and East Asia	(2023–present)	SPOTV
India	(2023–present)	Sony Sports Network
Nepal	(2023–present)	Sony Sports Network
Sri Lanka	(2023–present)	Sony Sports Network
Pakistan	(2023–present)	A Sports
South Africa	(2023–present)	SuperSport
United Arab Emirates	(2023–present)	Switch TV
Saudi Arabia	(2023–present)	Switch TV
United Kingdom	(2023–present)	Viaplay Sports
Ireland	(2023–present)	Viaplay Sports
Middle East and North Africa	(2023–present)	Starzplay
Continental Europe	(2023–present)	Recast
Pacific Islands	(2023–present)	TVWan
