= Falcons (women's cricket) =

Cricket team

- League: FairBreak Invitational T20

Personnel
- Captain: Suzie Bates
- Coach: Joanne Broadbent
- Manager: Saba Nasim

Team information
- Colours: Orange
- Founded: 2022

History
- FBI wins: 0

Falcons is a women's franchise cricket team, which was founded in 2022, and competes in the FairBreak Invitational T20. The team has no geographical base. They are currently being captained by Suzie Bates and coached by Joanne Broadbent. The rights and sponsorship of the franchise is currently acquired by K-Man Ventures.

== History ==
Falcons were formed in April 2022 to compete in the inaugural edition of the FairBreak Invitational T20, a multi-national women's Twenty20 cricket tournament, with Saba Nasim as the team manager. This was the first time that the team participated in any cricket competition at professional level. In May 2022, the all the tournament matches including the matches played by Falcons were sanctioned by the ICC. The team is made up of some of the best women players as well as emerging players from different countries of the world.

Falcons were captained by New Zealand cricketer Suzie Bates, and coached by Joanne Broadbent in the 2022 edition. They played their first ever WT20 match on 4 May 2022 against Warriors. They had a good start to their campaign by winning the opening match by 8 wickets, with Chamari Athapaththu hitting a century. They finished fourth in the league stage, winning two out of five matches. Although they lost all of their last three matches, they gained enough points to qualify for the knockout stage. They became the first team to qualify for the final by defeating Spirit by 25 runs. However, they finished as the runners-up of the tournament, losing the final match against Tornadoes by 8 wickets. Chamari Athapaththu was the leading run-scorer in the tournament with 313 runs.

In March 2023, K-Man Ventures bought the rights to the franchise and became the sponsor of the team ahead of the 2023 season. Falcons took part in the 2023 season again under the leadership of Suzie Bates, with Joanne Broadbent remaining as the coach. They won three out of their five league matches, and advanced to the knockout stage by beating Falcons by 9 wickets in the last league match. Falcons won the semi-final match against Barmy Army by 6 wickets and thus qualified for the final of the tournament. However, they again became the runners-up by losing the final by 94 runs in reply to Warriors' target of 204 runs.

== Current squad ==
Name	Nationality	Role
Suzie Bates	(New Zealand)	Batter
Chamari Athapaththu	(Sri Lanka)	Batter
Mas Elysa	(Malaysia)	Batter
Danni Wyatt	(England)	Batter
Christina Gough	(Germany)	Allrounder
Mariko Hill	(Hong Kong)	Allrounder
Marizanne Kapp	(South Africa)	Allrounder
Marina Lamplough	(Hong Kong)	Allrounder
Sornnarin Tippoch	(Thailand)	All-rounder
Jahanara Alam	(Bangladesh)	Bowler
Kaia Arua	(Papua New Guinea)	Bowler
Anju Gurung	(Bhutan)	Bowler
Gunjan Shukla	(Sweden)	Bowler
Nannapat Koncharoenkai	(Thailand)	Wicket-keeper
Theertha Satish	(United Arab Emirates)	Wicket-keeper

== Coaching staff ==
The following coaching panel was formed ahead of the 2023 season.

Position	Name
Team manager	(England) Saba Nasim
Head coach	(Australia) Joanne Broadbent
Assistant coach	(Hong Kong) Jasmine Titmuss
Physiotherapist	(Australia) Emily Boulton Smith

== Seasons ==
Season	League standings								Notes	Ref
Season	P	W	L	T	A	NRR	Pts	Pos	Notes	Ref
2022	5	2	3	0	0	–0.317	10	2nd	Runners-up	
2023	5	3	2	0	0	+1.160	13	3rd	Runners-up	
