= Babette de Leede =

Dutch cricketer

Personal information
- Full name: Babette Johanna Adriana de Leede
- Born: 8 October 1999 (age 27); Leidschendam, Netherlands
- Batting: Right-handed
- Role: Wicket-keeper
- Relatives: Tim de Leede (uncle); Bas de Leede (cousin)

International information
- National side: Netherlands
- ODI debut (cap 84): 22 August 2022 v Ireland
- Last ODI: 24 November 2022 v Thailand
- T20I debut (cap 26): 7 July 2018 v UAE
- Last T20I: 27 June 2026 v Pakistan

Domestic team information
- Years: Team
- 2021/22–2024/25): Western Province
- 2025/26: Boland
- 2026/27: South Western Districts

Career statistics
Competition	WT20I	WODI
Matches	89	13
Runs scored	1,552	289
Batting average	21.56	22.23
100s/50s	0/7	0/2
Top score	82*	76
Catches/stumpings	32/23	13/4
- Source: ESPNcricinfo, 5 October 2024

Babette Johanna Adriana de Leede (born 8 October 1999) is a Dutch cricketer who plays as a wicket-keeper and right-handed batter.

== Career ==
=== International cricket ===
She played for the Netherlands women's national cricket team in the 2015 ICC Women's World Twenty20 Qualifier in November 2015.

She was a member of the Netherlands squad for the 2018 ICC Women's World Twenty20 Qualifier tournament. She made her Women's Twenty20 International (WT20I) debut against United Arab Emirates in the World Twenty20 Qualifier on 7 July 2018. In July 2018, she was named in the ICC Women's Global Development Squad.

In May 2019, she was named in Netherlands' squad for the 2019 ICC Women's Qualifier Europe tournament in Spain. In August 2019, she was named in the Dutch squad for the 2019 ICC Women's World Twenty20 Qualifier tournament in Scotland. In October 2021, she was named in the Dutch team for the 2021 Women's Cricket World Cup Qualifier tournament in Zimbabwe.

During that Qualifier she made 78 runs against Sri Lanka on November 23, 2021. On August 26, 2022, she made 76 in a One Day International against Ireland at her home ground, Sportpark Westvliet.

In November 2022 De Leede made 33, 37, 30 and 59 in four consecutive ODIs against Thailand in Chiangmai, propelling her to the 46th spot in the ICC One Day International rankings.

In October 2024 De Leede took over the captaincy of the Dutch national team from Heather Siegers.

In February 2025 Babette led the Dutch women's team to four victories in six T20I matches in Kathmandu, Nepal: three against the host nation and one against Thailand.

In January 2026 Babette led the Dutch women's team to five consecutive victories, securing a ticket for the T20 World Cup in England and Wales in June 2026.

=== T20 World Cup 2026 ===
In June 2026 Babette made 50, 28, and 56 not out in her first three T20 World Cup appearances.

=== Club cricket ===
In May 2022, de Leede played five matches for the Sapphires team at the 2022 FairBreak Invitational T20 in Dubai, United Arab Emirates. During the Invitational, she scored a total of 85 runs, took one catch, and achieved seven stumpings. In her team's match against the Falcons team, she made 45 runs, racked up a world record of five stumpings, and was awarded player of the match.

Of the experience of playing at the FairBreak tournament, she has since said:

"For me, it offers the opportunity to compete with the world's best and to make some money, so that I can postpone an office job a bit and continue to play cricket for the Netherlands."

In March 2022 Babette made 75 for Western Province Women against Eastern Cape at Newlands.

In August 2022 she top scored with 122* for her team Voorburg CC against Quick in the Dutch domestic 40-over league.

On March 1, 2025 Babette top scored for Western Province with a maiden First Class century in South Africa at the highest level, 106 against Dolphins Women at Durban.

On May 20, 2025 it was announced that Babette would leave Western Province to join Boland.
