= Hayley Matthews =

Barbadian sportswoman

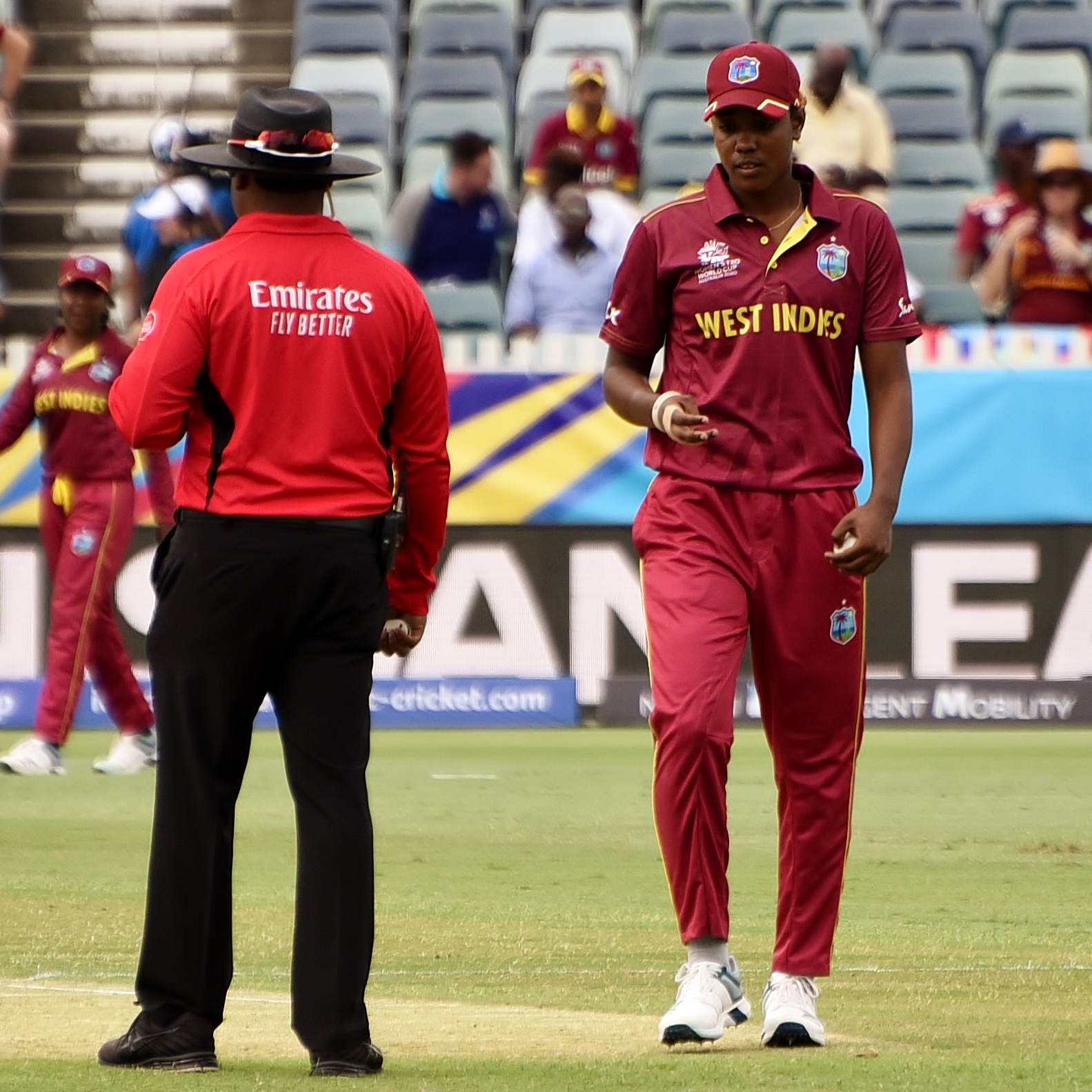
- Matthews in 2020 ICC Women's T20 World Cup

Personal information
- Full name: Hayley Kristen Matthews
- Born: 19 March 1998 (age 28); Barbados
- Batting: Right-handed
- Bowling: Right-arm off break
- Role: All-rounder

International information
- National sides: West Indies (2014–present); Barbados (2022)
- ODI debut (cap 81): 11 November 2014; West Indies v Australia
- Last ODI: 30 September 2026; West Indies v Zimbabwe
- T20I debut (cap 34/8): 27 September 2014; West Indies v New Zealand
- Last T20I: 30 June 2026; West Indies v Australia
- T20I shirt no.: 50

Domestic team information
- Years: Team
- 2010–present: Barbados
- 2015/16: Tasmania
- 2015/16–2020/21: Hobart Hurricanes
- 2016: Lancashire Thunder
- 2017: Southern Vipers
- 2019: Velocity
- 2019: Loughborough Lightning
- 2021–present: Welsh Fire
- 2022: Trailblazers
- 2022–present: Barbados Royals
- 2022/23: Melbourne Renegades
- 2023-present: Mumbai Indians

Career statistics
Competition	WODI	WT20I
Matches	111	127
Runs scored	3,892	3,382
Batting average	38.15	29.15
100s/50s	14/8	3/21
Top score	182	132
Balls bowled	4,976	2,396
Wickets	142	130
Bowling average	24.07	18.97
5 wickets in innings	0	0
10 wickets in match	0	0
Best bowling	4/15	4/10
Catches/stumpings	66/–	44/–
- Source: ESPNcricinfo, 1 October 2026

Hayley Kristen Matthews (born 19 March 1998) is a Barbadian sportswoman. She plays international cricket for the West Indies and Mumbai Indians as an all-rounder, batting right-handed and bowling right-arm off break. She plays domestic cricket for Barbados, Barbados Royals and Melbourne Renegades, and has previously played for Tasmania, Lancashire Thunder, Southern Vipers, Loughborough Lightning, Velocity and Hobart Hurricanes. She has also represented Barbados in the javelin throw at several international track and field competitions. In June 2022, Matthews was named as the captain of the West Indies women's cricket team, taking over from Stafanie Taylor.

== Early life and education ==
Matthews was born in Barbados and raised in Bridgetown, its capital and largest city. Her father, Mike, batted at no. 4 and bowled off-breaks for Pickwick Cricket Club, one of the island's leading clubs. Previously, he had played in the Barbados Under-19 team.

After Matthews started attending People's Cathedral Primary School, which was next door to her home, an opportunity arose for her to play the game formally. At the age of eight or nine, she asked the school's boys' team coach whether she could be a member of the team. Her request was granted. By the time she was 11 years old, she had become the team's captain.

At the end of her primary school years, Matthews did well enough in Barbados's controversial Common Entrance examinations to be accepted into the island's most prestigious secondary school, Harrison College, which was founded as an all-boys school in 1733. Although the college has charged no fees since the 1960s, and has been co-educational since 1980, it is often referred to as the 'Eton College of Barbados'. Its many sporting alumni include Sir Pelham ("Plum") Warner, the "Grand Old Man" of English cricket, and Sir Clyde Walcott.

Soon after starting at Harrison College, Matthews joined the school's previously all-boys' Under-13 team as an opening batter. With her assistance, the team immediately won a tournament. In her final year as an Under-13 player, she captained the team, the first female to do so.

Matthews recommends that talented young female cricketers play in boys' teams. She believes that her experiences in such teams assisted her with facing fast bowling, and improved her fielding. At the age of 18, she had already played in the Men's First Division for the Pickwick Club, alongside male players including West Indies batter Shai Hope. As of 2022, she was still in contact with most of the male players she used to captain in her Under-13 team.

== Domestic cricket career ==
=== West Indies / Barbados ===
Matthews made her debut for the Barbadian cricket team at the age of 12.

In July 2022, she was named as the captain of the Barbados team for the cricket tournament at the 2022 Commonwealth Games in Birmingham, England.

=== Australia: Women's Big Bash League ===
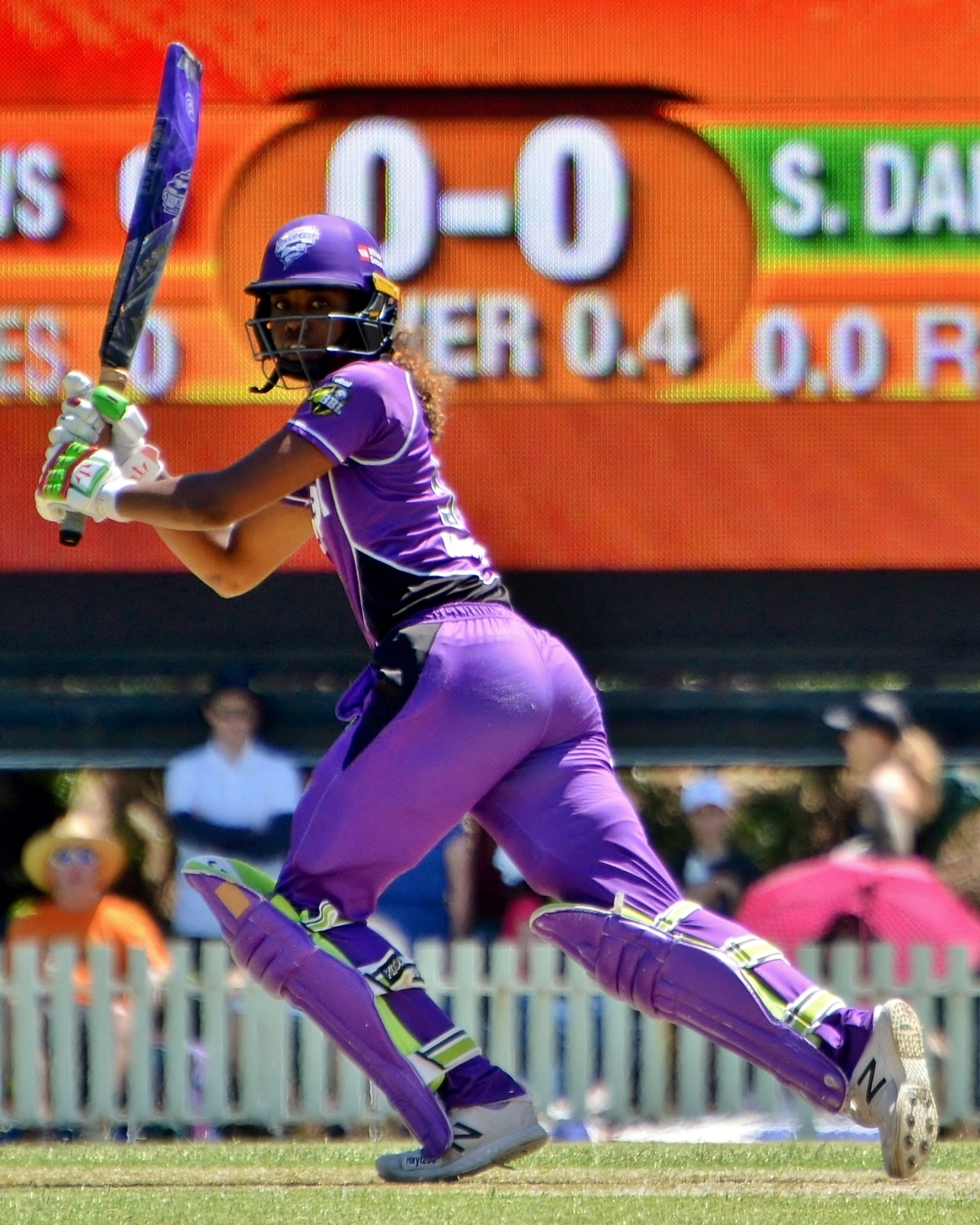
Matthews batting for Hobart Hurricanes during WBBL|03

Matthews spent the 2015–16 season playing domestic cricket in Australia, representing the Tasmanian Roar in the Women's National Cricket League and the Hobart Hurricanes in the inaugural season of the Women's Big Bash League. In one WBBL match against the Melbourne Stars, she scored 77 runs from 51 balls.

In November 2018, she was named in the Hobart Hurricanes' squad for the 2018–19 Women's Big Bash League season.

=== England and Wales: The Hundred ===
In 2021, Matthews was drafted by Welsh Fire for the inaugural season of The Hundred.

In April 2022, she was bought by the Welsh Fire for the 2022 season of The Hundred in England and Wales.

=== India ===
In March 2023, Matthews was selected to play for the Mumbai Indians in the 2023 Women's Premier League. She scored 271 runs and picked up 16 wickets in that league, helping her team to clinch the WPL title. She became the leading wicket-taker winning the Purple Cap, and was awarded the player of the tournament for her all-round performance.

== International cricket career ==
Matthews' international debut for the West Indies came at the age of 16, in a Twenty20 International against New Zealand in September 2014. Matthews made her One Day International (ODI) debut a few months later, scoring 55 runs from 86 balls in the first game of a four-ODI series against Australia. In the second game, she scored 89 runs from 108 balls, and in the third game, 60 runs from 81 balls.

Matthews has been a regular for the West Indies since her debut, and was a key member of the team that won the 2016 World Twenty20, scoring 66 runs from 45 balls in the final.

In October 2018, Cricket West Indies (CWI) awarded her a women's contract for the 2018–19 season. Later the same month, she was named in the West Indies' squad for the 2018 ICC Women's World Twenty20 tournament in the West Indies. Ahead of the tournament, she was named as the player to watch in the team, and was appointed vice-captain of the team.

In January 2020, she was named in West Indies' squad for the 2020 ICC Women's T20 World Cup in Australia. In September 2020, in the third match against England, Matthews took her 50th wicket in WT20Is.

In May 2021, Matthews was awarded with a central contract from Cricket West Indies. In October 2021, she was named in the West Indies team for the 2021 Women's Cricket World Cup Qualifier tournament in Zimbabwe. In February 2022, she was named in the West Indies team for the 2022 Women's Cricket World Cup in New Zealand.

On April 15, 2024 Matthews was named Wisden's Leading Twenty20 Cricketer in 2023

She was named as captain of the West Indies squad for the 2024 ICC Women's T20 World Cup. Matthews played in her 100th WT20I in the final group match against England, scoring 52 off 38 balls as West Indies clinched a semi-final place with a six-wicket win.

Matthews was captain was of the West Indies squad for the 2025 Women's Cricket World Cup Qualifier in Pakistan in April 2025.

During the 2nd ODI against Ireland, Matthews hit a career best score of 159* as West Indies chased down a target of 270 in 38.4 overs. In the same match Matthews and Realeanna Grimmond also formed the largest opening partnership in West Indies women's ODI history.

Hayley scored her 14th Women's ODI century in the third ODI against Zimbabwe in Harare, scoring 118 runs from 113 balls and finishing the three-match series with 326 runs at an average of 108.66

== International centuries ==
On 22 September 2018, Matthews scored her maiden ODI hundred against South Africa in front of her home crowd at Bridgetown. She had scored a duck in the opening match of the series and, after a wash-out in the second ODI, she hit 17 fours in her 146-ball 117.

Centuries by opponents
Opponent	WODI	WT20I	Total
Australia	–	1	1
Bangladesh	1	–	1
England	–	1	1
India	1	–	1
Ireland	3	1	4
New Zealand	1	–	1
Pakistan	3	–	3
South Africa	1	–	1
Scotland	1	–	1
Sri Lanka	1	–	1
Zimbabwe	2	–	–
Total	14	3	17

=== Key ===
- * – Remained not out
- ‡ – Captain of West Indies in that match
- † – Player of the match

One Day International centuries
No.	Runs	Match	Against	Pos.	Inn.	S/R	City, country	Venue	H/A/N	Year	Result	Ref
1	117 †	39	South Africa	1	1	80.13	Bridgetown, Barbados	Kensington Oval	Home	2018	Won	
2	100* †	46	Pakistan	1	2	81.96	North Sound, Antigua	Sir Vivian Richards Stadium	Home	2021	Won	
3	119 †	53	New Zealand	2	1	92.96	Mount Maunganui, New Zealand	Bay Oval	Away	2022	Won	
4	109 † ‡	76	Ireland	1	1	102.83	Gros Islet, Saint Lucia	Daren Sammy Cricket Ground	Home	2023	Won	
5	140* † ‡	81	Pakistan	1	1	93.33	Karachi, Pakistan	National Stadium	Away	2024	Won	
6	141 † ‡	83	Pakistan	1	1	94.63	Karachi, Pakistan	National Stadium	Away	2024	Won	
7	106 ‡	86	India	1	2	97.24	Vadodara, India	Kotambi Stadium	Away	2024	Lost	
8	104* † ‡	88	Bangladesh	1	2	111.82	Basseterre, Saint Kitts	Warner Park	Home	2025	Won	
9	114* † ‡	91	Scotland	1	2	100.88	Lahore, Pakistan	Lahore City Cricket Association Ground	Away	2025	Lost	
10	100 † ‡	102	Sri Lanka	1	2	84.03	St. George's, Grenada	National Cricket Stadium	Home	2026	Won	
11	159* † ‡	106	Ireland	1	2	129.26	Magheramason, Northern Ireland	Bready Cricket Club Ground	Away	2026	Won	
12	100 † ‡	107	Ireland	1	2	106.38	Magheramason, Northern Ireland	Bready Cricket Club Ground	Away	2026	Won	
13	182 † ‡	109	Zimbabwe	1	1	116.66	Harare, Zimbabwe	Harare Sports Club	Away	2026	Won	
14	118 † ‡	111	Zimbabwe	1	1	104.42	Harare, Zimbabwe	Harare Sports Club	Away	2026	Won	

Twenty20 International centuries
No.	Runs	Match	Against	Pos.	Inn.	S/R	City, country	Venue	H/A/N	Year	Result	Ref
1	107* †	41	Ireland	1	1	172.58	Dublin, Ireland	Sydney Parade	Away	2019	Won	
2	132 † ‡	87	Australia	1	2	206.25	Sydney, Australia	North Sydney Oval	Away	2023	Won	
3	100* † ‡	107	England	2	1	149.25	Canterbury, England	St Lawrence Ground	Away	2025	Lost	

== FairBreak career ==
Matthews has played for the Warriors team in two FairBreak Invitational T20 competitions. At the inaugural Invitational, held in Dubai in May 2022, she took 5/123 in five matches and made 153 runs at 30.60 including two half centuries: 58 against the Falcons and 52 against Barmy Army.

During the second Invitational, in Hong Kong in April 2023, Matthews took 5/88 and made an aggregate of 168 runs in four matches. Most of those runs were scored in the final, in which she was named Player of the Match after hitting 123 in 52 balls and then taking 2/14 to guide her team to victory in the match, and therefore also the tournament.

== Athletics career ==
As an athlete, Matthews competed in the javelin throw, and represented Barbados in a number of international meets and competitions. She won silver medals at the 2013 and 2014 CARIFTA Games, competing in the under-17 and under-18 categories, respectively. At the 2014 Central American and Caribbean Junior Championships in Athletics, held in Mexico, she won a bronze medal in the under-18 category, while at the 2015 CARIFTA Games she won her first gold medal, again competing in the under-18 category.

== Personal life ==
Matthews has type 1 diabetes. She was diagnosed with the condition at the age of 12, after displaying symptoms during a family vacation. Her father, also a diabetic, was the first to make sense of her symptoms. The diabetes is a challenge for Matthews' sporting career, but she controls it with good management. Her team mates are aware of it, and of what to expect.

Matthews is also a fan of English Premier League team Arsenal FC.

== Honours ==
=== Team ===
- ICC Women's World Twenty20 champion: 2016
- Women's Premier League champion: 2023
- FairBreak Invitational T20 champion: 2023 Hong Kong

=== Individual ===
- Women's Premier League Player of the Tournament: 2023
- Women's Premier League Purple Cap: 2023
