= FairBreak Global =

Company

- Formerly: Women's International Cricket League (WICL)
- Company type: Private
- Industry: Cricket; Gender equality
- Founded: 2013; 12 years ago
- Founders: Lisa Sthalekar, Shaun Martyn
- Key people: Shaun Martyn, Geoff Lawson
- Brands: FairBreak Invitational T20
- Services: Promotion of gender equality; Sport management
- Website: fairbreak.net

FairBreak Global is an Australian company that aims to improve gender equality, especially in relation to the game of cricket. In particular, it seeks to improve the financial gap between men's and women's cricket, along with differences in quality of play and available opportunities for women.

The company's main activity is the organisation and management of a women's cricket competition, the FairBreak Invitational T20 tournament.

== Objectives ==
FairBreak's vision is "[a] world where people have fair and equal access to opportunities that enable them to succeed in their chosen endeavor, independent of gender or geographical location." Its mission statement is "to create opportunities that progress gender equality on a truly global scale, using cricket as our primary vehicle".

== History ==
=== Foundation ===
FairBreak was founded in 2013 by Lisa Sthalekar, a former captain of the Australian women's cricket team, and her then manager, Shaun Martyn. Known initially as the Women's International Cricket League (WICL), the company came into existence in the aftermath of Sthalekar's retirement from international cricket, on the day Australia won the Women's Cricket World Cup in February 2013.

Sthalekar and Martyn had been introduced to each other about a decade earlier, by former Australian men's team fast bowler Geoff Lawson, as Martyn had been looking for a female guest speaker for a function. Martyn had later become Sthalekar's manager, the first for any female cricketer. Their management contract terms were unusual, because Sthalekar, although expected to train and perform like a professional athlete, was being paid very little for her work as an international cricketer, and thus was not being rewarded in any way similar to that of her male counterparts.

Even though Sthalekar, as of 2013, was the highest paid female cricketer in the world, her annual earnings as such were only A$15,000. She therefore also needed to have another, full-time, job to survive.

As Sthalekar's manager, Martyn helped her write her autobiography, which was published in 2012. Sthalekar then retired from international cricket. Meanwhile, Martyn and Sthalekar were considering the quality of women's cricket, the extent to which it had improved, and also what they felt was the potential worldwide audience for the women's form of the game. As the outcome of those thoughts, they established the company, with the objective of creating opportunity, education and performance for women.

=== Early activities ===
==== Women's International Cricket League ====
Soon after its establishment, the company developed a proposal for a Women's International Cricket League (WICL), as a counterpart to the Indian Premier League for male cricketers. Its aim was to attract the world's best women cricketers and thus provide more opportunities and improved remuneration for female players.

By late April 2014, the proposal was that a six-team women's Twenty20 (WT20) competition would be staged in Singapore over 10 to 12 days. "Some of our tier-one players for the tournament will earn A$30,000 to A$40,000," Martyn told Fairfax Media, "And that's only in year one. We have to move that salary cap up each year as we grow the business ..." A number of well known names in cricket, including Lawson, Clive Lloyd, and Paul Marsh, the then CEO of the Australian Cricketers' Association, were said to be supportive of the proposal.

At about that time, the WICL proposal was discussed by the International Cricket Council (ICC), but was not supported by either the ICC or any of its members. In early June 2014, Clare Connor, the then head of women's cricket at the England Cricket Board (ECB) and chair of the ICC women's committee, said that "... from an ECB perspective this competition is not on our agenda." The following day, Pat Howard, the then Executive General Manager of Team Performance at Cricket Australia (CA), confirmed that "... CA has not endorsed the [WICL] competition in any way." In 2013, CA had restructured its contracting system for female international and state cricketers, and in May 2014, the ECB had announced that 18 women would be given upgraded contracts.

As of August 2015, the proposed WICL competition had become a two-week long Twenty20 championship, and the company was partnering with Edinburgh Business School, Hindustan Institute of Technology and Science and the University of Western Australia to create scholarship opportunities for leading players. That month, Martyn told Sports Business Journal that the company had been "working very hard" with cricket boards and the ICC in an effort to find "the appropriate window in the calendar". He also said that "It's about, 'How can we help develop women's cricket globally?'".

For approximately a couple of years, Martyn told The Guardian in 2022, the ICC would send the company off to partner with one of its member boards in organising a cricket tournament, the board would later send the company back to the ICC to obtain permission, and the process "... just became a bit of a revolving door." Meanwhile, CA set up the Women's Big Bash League and the ECB established the Kia Super League, in what The Guardian claimed in 2022 "... was partly a deliberate attempt to take the wind out of Martyn's sails."

==== Other initiatives ====
By 2016, the company had dropped the WICL proposal and had started to focus on other, more modest, initiatives. That year, in partnership with Pymble Ladies College (PLC) of Sydney, Australia, the company held a FairBreak South Pacific training and development camp at King's College, Auckland, New Zealand, for 12 female cricketers from South Pacific nations and Singapore. Sthalaker had been inspired to initiate the training camp by a documentary about the all-female-crewed Team SCA's involvement in the 2014–15 Volvo Ocean Race; the coaches at the camp included Lawson, Sthalaker, and Martyn. In 2017, the company, again in partnership with PLC, started an ongoing program of training a number of PLC students in the use of social media for business purposes.

The same year, the company also began working with an Australian charity, SolarBuddy, to install solar lights in off-the-grid communities in Africa, India and Papua New Guinea. The purpose of the SolarBuddy collaboration was to replace kerosene lamps, which, especially when malfunctioning, produce fumes hazardous to the impoverished families that use them.

The first cricket match to be organised by the company, a WT20 exhibition and charity event on what was billed as the Day of Gender Equality, was staged at the Wormsley Cricket Ground in Buckinghamshire, England, on 30 May 2018. The event began with a "Gender Equality summit", after which a Sir Paul Getty XI captained by Charlotte Edwards defeated a Suzie Bates-led FairBreak XI by 24 runs. The FairBreak XI squad included players from 11 different countries, and the match was livestreamed online.

Between then and the onset of the COVID-19 pandemic, the company, under its new name FairBreak, staged two further cricketing events. In July 2019, a FairBreak team of 14 players from 10 countries went on a four-game tour of the United Kingdom. One of the players, Stephanie Frohnmayer, a practising gynaecologist from Germany, flew back to her home town, Munich, on the team's weekend off to deliver four babies, and then returned to London to play the MCC in back to back T20 matches. In February 2020, a FairBreak Global XI including players from eight countries played a Bradman Women's XI captained by Alex Blackwell at the Bradman Oval in Bowral, Australia. The match generated some unexpected publicity when the Australian government initially denied Botswanan player Shameelah Mosweu a visa to enter the country, but that decision was swiftly reversed in time for Mosweu to travel to Bowral and take the field.

== Ongoing activities ==
=== FairBreak Invitational T20 ===
Since the abatement of the COVID-19 pandemic, FairBreak's primary activity has been the organisation and management, in conjunction with Cricket Hong Kong, of the FairBreak Invitational T20 tournament, a competition sanctioned by the ICC.

The inaugural invitational, held in May 2022, was originally scheduled to be played in Hong Kong, but was moved to Dubai due to COVID-19 restrictions. Players from 35 countries were distributed between six teams.

Martyn has claimed that in staging the Invitational, which he says is "global", FairBreak is not seeking to compete with domestic women's cricket franchise tournaments. His vision has shifted, and is now centred on players from ICC Associate Member nations, who he felt were missing from the domestic franchise leagues. According to Arab News, the Invitational:

"... provides a welcome opportunity for associate players to play against and alongside some of the world’s best female cricketers. It also enables players from Full Member countries to gain an understanding of the challenges faced by associate players, as well as appreciating their skill sets.

Most national cricket boards have been delighted to allow their players to take part."

In another article commenting on the inaugural Invitational, Cricket Europe praised the event as 'an undoubted success', and as 'doing a great job'. However, The Guardian was more cautious, commenting that "... there remain question marks over whether the enterprise is financially sustainable over the longer term," and suggesting that "[t]he idea that [Martyn] would be no threat to the ICC," if he were to achieve his goal for the Invitational "... seems naive at best."

The second Invitational took place at Kowloon Cricket Club in Hong Kong from the 3rd to the 16th of April 2023. An additional tournament for 2023, staged in collaboration with USA Cricket, will be played in Houston, Texas, USA, between 15 and 30 September 2023.

In 2024, Martyn announced that he would be stepping back from the operational role at the FairBreak.

=== Other projects ===
At the inaugural Invitational, a researcher and a physiotherapist from Breast Research Australia, based at the University of Wollongong, held consultations with participating cricketers focusing on breast pain, injuries or any breast support issues. The consultation was intended to be a model of future care for physiotherapists and professional female athletes across all sports. Breast Research Australia aims to promote breast health awareness to women around the world, and has developed an online Sports Bra app to help women choose a correctly fitting sports bra design.

FairBreak has also continued its collaboration with SolarBuddy in distributing solar lights. After bushfires burnt out large areas of the South Coast region of New South Wales over the Australian summer of 2019–20, Martyn, who resides in Narooma, New South Wales, arranged for 5,000 solar lights to be supplied to people in towns between Bega and Nowra who had been cut off from the electricity grid.

Later in 2020, following discussions between Martyn and Sydney Sixers men's team coach Greg Shipperd, FairBreak branded its collaboration with SolarBuddy as "Captain's Cause" and, together with Shipperd, recruited national cricket team captains from around the world to endorse the collaboration. The company also set two goals for the Captain's Cause initiative: to donate six million solar lights by 2030 to children living in extreme energy poverty, and to educate six million people globally about the extreme energy poverty issue.

FairBreak also supports the Sri Ayyappan School in Bangalore, India, with solar lights, cricket equipment, and regular visits from ambassadors and players.
