= 2025 Women's Emerging Nations Trophy =

International cricket tournament

- Dates: 20 – 30 November 2025
- Administrator: International Cricket Council
- Cricket format: Twenty20 International
- Tournament format: Round-robin
- Host: Thailand
- Champions: Thailand (1st title)
- Runners-up: United Arab Emirates
- Participants: 8
- Matches: 28
- Player of the series: (United Arab Emirates) Esha Oza
- Most runs: (Scotland) Darcey Carter (248)
- Most wickets: (Thailand) Thipatcha Putthawong (15) (United Arab Emirates) Vaishnave Mahesh (15)

The 2025 ICC Women's Emerging Nations Trophy was the inaugural edition of the ICC Women's Emerging Nations Trophy, a Twenty20 International (T20I) cricket tournament that took place from 20 to 30 November 2025 in Thailand. The competition was launched to support the ICC's strategy to promote women's cricket and expand worldwide participation.

The tournament was contested by the top eight associate member teams, including the five teams with ODI status and the three other highest-ranked teams in ICC Women's T20I Team Rankings as of 1 May 2025.

Thailand won the tournament on net run rate, after four teams tied with five wins each.

== Teams and qualification ==
Means of qualification	Berth(s)	Qualified
Teams with ODI status	5	Netherlands
Teams with ODI status	5	Papua New Guinea
Teams with ODI status	5	Scotland
Teams with ODI status	5	Thailand
Teams with ODI status	5	United Arab Emirates
ICC Women's T20I Team Rankings	3	Namibia
ICC Women's T20I Team Rankings	3	Tanzania
ICC Women's T20I Team Rankings	3	Uganda
Total	8	

== Squads ==
Namibia	Netherlands	Papua New Guinea	Scotland
Sune Wittmann (c); Naomi Benjamin; Jurriene Diergaardt; Merczerly Gorases; Kayleen Green; Victoria Hamunyela; Eveleen Kejarukua; Yasmeen Khan (wk); Bianca Manuel; Mekelaye Mwatile; Wilka Mwatile; Sylvia Shihepo; Edelle Van Zyl; Leigh-Marie Visser	Babette de Leede (c, wk); Merel Dekeling; Caroline de Lange; Sterre Kalis; Sanya Khurana; Hannah Landheer; Lara Leemhuis; Phebe Molkenboer; Frederique Overdijk; Robine Rijke; Silver Siegers; Myrthe van den Raad; Isabel van der Woning; Iris Zwilling	Brenda Tau (c, wk); Pauke Siaka (vc); Hollan Doriga; Brenda Elly; Dika Lohia; Konio Oala; Erani Pokana; Miria Raio; Lakshmi Rajadurai; Hane Tau; Henao Thomas; Geua Tom; Mairi Tom; Isabel Toua; Naoani Vare	Sarah Bryce (c, wk); Chloe Abel; Olivia Bell; Darcey Carter; Priyanaz Chatterji; Katherine Fraser; Ailsa Lister (wk); Abtaha Maqsood; Megan McColl; Mollie Parker; Hannah Rainey; Niamh Robertson-Jack; Rachel Slater; Ellen Watson
Tanzania	Thailand	Uganda	United Arab Emirates
Neema Pius (c); Saum Borakambi; Saumu Hussein (wk); Sophia Jerome; Perice Kamunya; Fatuma Kibasu; Jenifer Kimaro; Sheila Kizito; Nasra Mohamedi; Shufaa Mohamedi (wk); Saum Mtae; Hudaa Omary; Nasra Saidi; Mwanamvua Ushanga	Naruemol Chaiwai (c, wk); Nattaya Boochatham; Nannaphat Chaihan; Natthakan Chantham; Sunida Chaturongrattana; Onnicha Kamchomphu; Rosenanee Kanoh; Suwanan Khiaoto; Nannapat Koncharoenkai (wk); Suleeporn Laomi; Phannita Maya; Thipatcha Putthawong; Chanida Sutthiruang; Aphisara Suwanchonrathi	Janet Mbabazi (c); Rita Musamali (vc); Sarah Akiteng; Prosscovia Alako; Naume Amongin; Kevin Amuge; Malisa Ariokot; Concy Aweko; Kevin Awino (wk); Esther Iloku (wk); Irene Mutoni; Immaculate Nakisuuyi; Stephani Nampiina; Teddy Oyella	Esha Oza (c); Michelle Botha; Samaira Dharnidharka; Udeni Dona; Siya Gokhale; Heena Hotchandani; Al Maseera Jahangir; Lavanya Keny; Suraksha Kotte; Vaishnave Mahesh; Indhuja Nandakumar; Rinitha Rajith; Theertha Satish (wk); Athige Silva

== Quadrangular series ==
Thailand Women's Quadrangular Series
- Dates: 14 – 17 November 2025
- Administrator: Cricket Association of Thailand
- Cricket format: Twenty20 International
- Tournament format: Round-robin
- Host: Thailand
- Champions: Scotland
- Runners-up: Thailand
- Participants: 4
- Matches: 6
- Most runs: (Scotland) Darcey Carter (119)
- Most wickets: (Thailand) Onnicha Kamchomphu (5)

A quadrangular tournament was played before the Emerging Nations Trophy.

=== Points table ===
Pos	Team	Pld	W	L	NR	Pts	NRR
1	Scotland	3	3	0	0	6	1.584
2	Thailand	3	2	1	0	4	0.755
3	Papua New Guinea	3	1	2	0	2	−0.945
4	Namibia	3	0	3	0	0	−1.252

Source: ESPNcricinfo

==== Fixtures ====
14 November 2025
09:00
Scorecard

Scotland; 146/4 (20 overs)	v	Papua New Guinea; 91/8 (20 overs)
Darcey Carter 71* (59); Geua Tom 1/22 (2 overs)		Konio Oala 25 (21); Niamh Robertson-Jack 3/17 (4 overs)

Scotland won by 55 runs
Terdthai Cricket Ground, Bangkok
Umpires: Samad Akbar (Tha) and KB Suresh (Tha)
Player of the match: Darcey Carter (Sco)

- Papua New Guinea won the toss and elected to field.

14 November 2025
13:30
Scorecard

Thailand; 124/5 (20 overs)	v	Namibia; 85 (18.3 overs)
Nannapat Koncharoenkai 46* (43); Sylvia Shihepo 3/25 (3 overs)		Sune Wittmann 30 (34); Onnicha Kamchomphu 5/18 (4 overs)

Thailand won by 39 runs
Terdthai Cricket Ground, Bangkok
Umpires: Sanjeev Jeyasooriyam (Tha) and KB Suresh (Tha)
Player of the match: Onnicha Kamchomphu (Tha)

- Thailand won the toss and elected to bat.
- Onnicha Kamchomphu (Tha) took her first five-wicket haul in T20Is.

15 November 2025
09:00
Scorecard

Namibia; 74 (19.4 overs)	v	Papua New Guinea; 75/4 (19.1 overs)
Yasmeen Khan 23 (29); Dika Lohia 2/14 (2 overs)		Brenda Tau 27* (34); Wilka Mwatile 2/7 (4 overs)

Papua New Guinea won by 6 wickets
Terdthai Cricket Ground, Bangkok
Umpires: Samad Akbar (Tha) and KB Suresh (Tha)
Player of the match: Mairi Tom (PNG)

- Namibia won the toss and elected to bat.

15 November 2025
13:30
Scorecard

Thailand; 136/5 (20 overs)	v	Scotland; 137/8 (20 overs)
Nannapat Koncharoenkai 31 (27); Priyanaz Chatterji 2/11 (2 overs)		Sarah Bryce 31 (21); Thipatcha Putthawong 3/18 (4 overs)

Scotland won by 2 wickets
Terdthai Cricket Ground, Bangkok
Umpires: Sanjeev Jeyasooriyam (Tha) and KB Suresh (Tha)
Player of the match: Rachel Slater (Sco)

- Thailand won the toss and elected to bat.

17 November 2025
09:30
Scorecard

Namibia; 81/9 (20 overs)	v	Scotland; 82/3 (14.2 overs)
Kayleen Green 42 (56); Rachel Slater 3/11 (4 overs)		Ellen Watson 30 (34); Sune Wittmann 1/6 (1 over)

Scotland won by 7 wickets
Terdthai Cricket Ground, Bangkok
Umpires: Samad Akbar (Tha) and Sanjeev Jeayasooriyam (Tha)
Player of the match: Rachel Slater (Sco)

- Namibia won the toss and elected to bat.

17 November 2025
13:45
Scorecard

Papua New Guinea; 109/4 (20 overs)	v	Thailand; 110/3 (19 overs)
Naoani Vare 55* (55); Phannita Maya 2/29 (4 overs)		Natthakan Chantham 45* (38); Pauke Siaka 1/10 (4 overs)

Thailand won by 7 wickets
Terdthai Cricket Ground, Bangkok
Umpires: Samad Akbar (Tha) and KB Suresh (Tha)
Player of the match: Natthakan Chantham (Tha)

- Papua New Guinea won the toss and elected to bat.

== Points table ==
Pos	Team	Pld	W	L	Pts	NRR
1	Thailand	7	5	2	10	1.362
2	United Arab Emirates	7	5	2	10	1.278
3	Netherlands	7	5	2	10	0.987
4	Scotland	7	5	2	10	0.359
5	Papua New Guinea	7	4	3	8	0.026
6	Uganda	7	2	5	4	−1.040
7	Namibia	7	1	6	2	−1.345
8	Tanzania	7	1	6	2	−1.649

Source: ESPNcricinfo

== Fixtures ==
20 November 2025
09:00
Scorecard

Thailand; 117/7 (20 overs)	v	Netherlands; 94 (18.5 overs)
Natthakan Chantham 39 (36); Silver Siegers 2/11 (4 overs)		Babette de Leede 25 (16); Suleeporn Laomi 2/11 (4 overs)

Thailand won by 23 runs
Terdthai Cricket Ground, Bangkok
Umpires: Tina Semmens (NZ) and Rokeya Sultana (Ban)
Player of the match: Suleeporn Laomi (Tha)

- Netherlands won the toss and elected to field.

20 November 2025
09:00
Scorecard

Papua New Guinea; 94/5 (20 overs)	v	United Arab Emirates; 95/2 (15.2 overs)
Brenda Tau 53 (55); Samaira Dharnidharka 2/17 (4 overs)		Theertha Satish 45 (41); Henao Thomas 1/16 (2 overs)

United Arab Emirates won by 8 wickets
Asian Institute of Technology Ground, Bangkok
Umpires: Ankita Guha (Ind) and Dedunu Silva (SL)
Player of the match: Theertha Satish (UAE)

- United Arab Emirates won the toss and elected to field.

20 November 2025
12:45
Scorecard

Scotland; 115/9 (20 overs)	v	Uganda; 100/6 (20 overs)
Darcey Carter 54* (50); Janet Mbabazi 3/17 (3 overs)		Immaculate Nakisuuyi 36 (42); Abtaha Maqsood 2/20 (4 overs)

Scotland won by 15 runs
Terdthai Cricket Ground, Bangkok
Umpires: Saleema Imtiaz (Pak) and Dolly Rani (Ban)
Player of the match: Darcey Carter (Sco)

- Scotland won the toss and elected to bat.
- Mollie Parker (Sco) made her T20I debut.

20 November 2025
12:45
Scorecard

Namibia; 118/5 (20 overs)	v	Tanzania; 119/2 (17 overs)
Sune Wittmann 53 (50); Mwanamvua Ushanga 2/27 (3 overs)		Saum Mtae 55* (45); Jurriene Diergaardt 1/11 (2 overs)

Tanzania won by 8 wickets
Asian Institute of Technology Ground, Bangkok
Umpires: Maria Abbott (WI) and Champa Chakma (Ban)
Player of the match: Saum Mtae (Tan)

- Namibia won the toss and elected to bat.

21 November 2025
09:00
Scorecard

Papua New Guinea; 92/9 (20 overs)	v	Thailand; 84/8 (20 overs)
Isabel Toua 25 (25); Suleeporn Laomi 3/14 (4 overs)		Naruemol Chaiwai 44 (40); Pauke Siaka 4/12 (4 overs)

Papua New Guinea won by 8 runs
Terdthai Cricket Ground, Bangkok
Umpires: Saleema Imtiaz (Pak) and Tina Semmens (NZ)
Player of the match: Pauke Siaka (PNG)

- Papua New Guinea won the toss and elected to bat.

21 November 2025
09:00
Scorecard

United Arab Emirates; 93 (17.4 overs)	v	Netherlands; 94/6 (18.5 overs)
Heena Hotchandani 30 (39); Robine Rijke 2/11 (2 overs)		Sterre Kalis 40 (43); Vaishnave Mahesh 3/22 (4 overs)

Netherlands won by 4 wickets
Asian Institute of Technology Ground, Bangkok
Umpires: Ankita Guha (Ind) and Dolly Rani (Ban)
Player of the match: Sterre Kalis (Ned)

- Netherlands won the toss and elected to field.

21 November 2025
12:45
Scorecard

Namibia; 83/8 (20 overs)	v	Uganda; 71/7 (20 overs)
Kayleen Green 21 (37); Sarah Akiteng 2/10 (4 overs)		Immaculate Nakisuuyi 17 (27); Leigh-Marie Visser 3/10 (4 overs)

Namibia won by 12 runs
Terdthai Cricket Ground, Bangkok
Umpires: Champa Chakma (Ban) and Rokeya Sultana (Ban)
Player of the match: Leigh-Marie Visser (Nam)

- Uganda won the toss and elected to field.
- Leigh-Marie Visser (Nam) made her T20I debut.

21 November 2025
12:45
Scorecard

Scotland; 153/5 (20 overs)	v	Tanzania; 148/8 (20 overs)
Darcey Carter 76* (62); Perice Kamunya 2/33 (4 overs)		Hudaa Omary 38* (34); Darcey Carter 3/23 (4 overs)

Scotland won by 5 runs
Asian Institute of Technology Ground, Bangkok
Umpires: Maria Abbott (WI) and Tina Semmens (NZ)
Player of the match: Darcey Carter (Sco)

- Scotland won the toss and elected to bat.

23 November 2025
09:30
Scorecard

Uganda; 117/4 (20 overs)	v	Papua New Guinea; 113/7 (20 overs)
Janet Mbabazi 60* (58); Dika Lohia 1/9 (2 overs)		Pauke Siaka 39 (23); Janet Mbabazi 2/21 (2 overs)

Uganda won by 4 runs
Terdthai Cricket Ground, Bangkok
Umpires: Ankita Guha (Ind) and Rokeya Sultana (Ban)
Player of the match: Janet Mbabazi (Uga)

- Uganda won the toss and elected to bat.

23 November 2025
09:30
Scorecard

Tanzania; 62 (19.4 overs)	v	Netherlands; 63/3 (12.2 overs)
Hudaa Omary 14 (18); Iris Zwilling 3/13 (4 overs)		Sterre Kalis 24 (29); Sophia Jerome 2/19 (4 overs)

Netherlands won by 7 wickets
Asian Institute of Technology Ground, Bangkok
Umpires: Maria Abbott (WI) and Saleema Imtiaz (Pak)
Player of the match: Iris Zwilling (Ned)

- Netherlands won the toss and elected to field.

23 November 2025
13:45
Scorecard

United Arab Emirates; 93/8 (20 overs)	v	Scotland; 94/0 (14.5 overs)
Samaira Dharnidharka 17 (19); Katherine Fraser 2/12 (4 overs)		Darcey Carter 54* (56)

Scotland won by 10 wickets
Terdthai Cricket Ground, Bangkok
Umpires: Dolly Rani (Ban) and Dedunu Silva (SL)
Player of the match: Darcey Carter (Sco)

- United Arab Emirates won the toss and elected to bat.

23 November 2025
13:45
Scorecard

Thailand; 115/6 (20 overs)	v	Namibia; 88/8 (20 overs)
Natthakan Chantham 58* (56); Naomi Benjamin 2/16 (4 overs)		Yasmeen Khan 27 (34); Sunida Chaturongrattana 3/19 (4 overs)

Thailand won by 27 runs
Asian Institute of Technology Ground, Bangkok
Umpires: Champa Chakma (Ban) and Tina Semmens (NZ)
Player of the match: Sunida Chaturongrattana (Tha)

- Namibia won the toss and elected to field.

25 November 2025
09:30
Scorecard

Thailand; 110/6 (20 overs)	v	Tanzania; 59 (19 overs)
Nannapat Koncharoenkai 28 (40); Sheila Kizito 2/18 (4 overs)		Nasra Saidi 15 (30); Sunida Chaturongrattana 3/4 (4 overs)

Thailand won by 51 runs
Terdthai Cricket Ground, Bangkok
Umpires: Champa Chakma (Ban) and Ankita Guha (Ind)
Player of the match: Sunida Chaturongrattana (Tha)

- Tanzania won the toss and elected to field.

25 November 2025
09:30
Scorecard

Uganda; 75/8 (20 overs)	v	United Arab Emirates; 76/0 (8.2 overs)
Janet Mbabazi 16 (26); Vaishnave Mahesh 3/21 (4 overs)		Esha Oza 48* (30)

United Arab Emirates won by 10 wickets
Asian Institute of Technology Ground, Bangkok
Umpires: Dolly Rani (Ban) and Tina Semmens (NZ)
Player of the match: Esha Oza (UAE)

- United Arab Emirates won the toss and elected to field.

25 November 2025
13:45
Scorecard

Papua New Guinea; 126/2 (20 overs)	v	Netherlands; 118/9 (20 overs)
Naoani Vare 45* (55); Caroline de Lange 1/20 (4 overs)		Sterre Kalis 40 (38); Pauke Siaka 3/22 (4 overs)

Papua New Guinea won by 8 runs
Terdthai Cricket Ground, Bangkok
Umpires: Saleema Imtiaz (Pak) and Rokeya Sultana (Ban)
Player of the match: Henao Thomas (PNG)

- Papua New Guinea won the toss and elected to bat.

25 November 2025
13:45
Scorecard

Namibia; 74 (16.2 overs)	v	Scotland; 76/3 (8.4 overs)
Mekelaye Mwatile 15* (32); Katherine Fraser 3/9 (4 overs)		Sarah Bryce 36* (17); Naomi Benjamin 2/15 (2.4 overs)

Scotland won by 7 wickets
Asian Institute of Technology Ground, Bangkok
Umpires: Maria Abbott (WI) and Dedunu Silva (SL)
Player of the match: Katherine Fraser (Sco)

- Scotland won the toss and elected to field.

26 November 2025
09:30
Scorecard

Tanzania; 46 (16.5 overs)	v	United Arab Emirates; 50/3 (7.1 overs)
Neema Pius 10 (18); Vaishnave Mahesh 3/7 (4 overs)		Esha Oza 28 (16); Perice Kamunya 2/12 (2.1 overs)

United Arab Emirates won by 7 wickets
Terdthai Cricket Ground, Bangkok
Umpires: Champa Chakma (Ban) and Saleema Imtiaz (Pak)
Player of the match: Vaishnave Mahesh (UAE)

- Tanzania won the toss and elected to bat.

26 November 2025
09:30
Scorecard

Uganda; 55 (19.3 overs)	v	Thailand; 58/2 (9 overs)
Stephani Nampiina 22 (42); Thipatcha Putthawong 5/6 (3.3 overs)		Nannapat Koncharoenkai 28* (23); Concy Aweko 1/21 (4 overs)

Thailand won by 8 wickets
Asian Institute of Technology Ground, Bangkok
Umpires: Dolly Rani (Ban) and Dedunu Silva (SL)
Player of the match: Thipatcha Putthawong (Tha)

- Thailand won the toss and elected to field.

26 November 2025
13:45
Scorecard

Netherlands; 164/6 (20 overs)	v	Namibia; 113 (16.2 overs)
Sterre Kalis 47 (38); Sylvia Shihepo 1/12 (1 over)		Yasmeen Khan 41 (15); Frederique Overdijk 4/18 (3.2 overs)

Netherlands won by 51 runs
Terdthai Cricket Ground, Bangkok
Umpires: Ankita Guha (Ind) and Tina Semmens (NZ)
Player of the match: Frederique Overdijk (Ned)

- Namibia won the toss and elected to field.

26 November 2025
13:45
Scorecard

Papua New Guinea; 118/8 (20 overs)	v	Scotland; 121/4 (19.5 overs)
Hollan Doriga 63 (51); Chloe Abel 5/13 (4 overs)		Sarah Bryce 39* (29); Isabel Toua 1/24 (4 overs)

Scotland won by 6 wickets
Asian Institute of Technology Ground, Bangkok
Umpires: Maria Abbott (WI) and Rokeya Sultana (Ban)
Player of the match: Chloe Abel (Sco)

- Papua New Guinea won the toss and elected to bat.
- Chloe Abel (Sco) took her first five-wicket haul in T20Is.

28 November 2025
09:30
Scorecard

United Arab Emirates; 80 (20 overs)	v	Thailand; 73 (19.3 overs)
Michelle Botha 18 (32); Sunida Chaturongrattana 2/9 (4 overs)		Suwanan Khiaoto 24 (24); Vaishnave Mahesh 4/10 (4 overs)

United Arab Emirates won by 7 runs
Terdthai Cricket Ground, Bangkok
Umpires: Saleema Imtiaz (Pak) and Rokeya Sultana (Ban)
Player of the match: Vaishnave Mahesh (UAE)

- Thailand won the toss and elected to field.

28 November 2025
09:30
Scorecard

Tanzania; 54 (19.5 overs)	v	Uganda; 55/3 (12.3 overs)
Fatuma Kibasu 10 (16); Immaculate Nakisuuyi 2/12 (4 overs)		Esther Iloku 28* (41); Jenifer Kimaro 1/4 (2 overs)

Uganda won by 7 wickets
Asian Institute of Technology Ground, Bangkok
Umpires: Ankita Guha (Ind) and Dolly Rani (Ban)
Player of the match: Immaculate Nakisuuyi (Uga)

- Uganda won the toss and elected to field.

28 November 2025
13:45
Scorecard

Papua New Guinea; 94/7 (20 overs)	v	Namibia; 93/7 (20 overs)
Brenda Tau 30 (29); Sune Wittmann 2/10 (2 overs)		Yasmeen Khan 30* (36); Pauke Siaka 3/15 (4 overs)

Papua New Guinea won by 1 run
Asian Institute of Technology Ground, Bangkok
Umpires: Maria Abbott (WI) and Tina Semmens (NZ)
Player of the match: Pauke Siaka (PNG)

- Namibia won the toss and elected to field.

28 November 2025
13:45
Scorecard

Netherlands; 148/7 (20 overs)	v	Scotland; 121/8 (20 overs)
Sterre Kalis 55* (44); Rachel Slater 3/22 (4 overs)		Katherine Fraser 39 (32); Iris Zwilling 3/19 (4 overs)

Netherlands won by 27 runs
Terdthai Cricket Ground, Bangkok
Umpires: Champa Chakma (Ban) and Dedunu Silva (SL)
Player of the match: Sterre Kalis (Ned)

- Netherlands won the toss and elected to bat.

30 November 2025
09:30
Scorecard

Uganda; 111/6 (20 overs)	v	Netherlands; 112/4 (14.5 overs)
Prosscovia Alako 34 (29); Silver Siegers 2/12 (4 overs)		Robine Rijke 36* (31); Kevin Amuge 2/13 (3 overs)

Netherlands won by 6 wickets
Terdthai Cricket Ground, Bangkok
Umpires: Dedunu Silva (SL) and Rokeya Sultana (Ban)
Player of the match: Robine Rijke (Ned)

- Netherlands won the toss and elected to field.

30 November 2025
09:30
Scorecard

United Arab Emirates; 153/3 (20 overs)	v	Namibia; 125/7 (20 overs)
Esha Oza 68 (49); Mekelaye Mwatile 1/2 (1 over)		Wilka Mwatile 54* (34); Vaishnave Mahesh 2/13 (4 overs)

United Arab Emirates won by 28 runs
Asian Institute of Technology Ground, Bangkok
Umpires: Ankita Guha (Ind) and Dolly Rani (Ban)
Player of the match: Esha Oza (UAE)

- United Arab Emirates won the toss and elected to bat.

30 November 2025
13:45
Scorecard

Papua New Guinea; 100 (20 overs)	v	Tanzania; 80/8 (20 overs)
Henao Thomas 47 (57); Saum Borakambi 2/17 (4 overs)		Perice Kamunya 27 (29); Pauke Siaka 3/10 (4 overs)

Papua New Guinea won by 20 runs
Terdthai Cricket Ground, Bangkok
Umpires: Champa Chakma (Ban) and Tina Semmens (NZ)
Player of the match: Henao Thomas (PNG)

- Papua New Guinea won the toss and elected to bat.
- Brenda Elly (PNG) made her T20I debut.

30 November 2025
13:45
Scorecard

Scotland; 63 (15.1 overs)	v	Thailand; 65/7 (11.4 overs)
Priyanaz Chatterji 9 (7); Thipatcha Putthawong 4/17 (4 overs)		Naruemol Chaiwai 17* (21); Olivia Bell 5/8 (4 overs)

Thailand won by 3 wickets
Asian Institute of Technology Ground, Bangkok
Umpires: Ankita Guha (Ind) and Saleema Imtiaz (Pak)
Player of the match: Thipatcha Putthawong (Tha)

- Scotland won the toss and elected to bat.
- Olivia Bell (Sco) took her first five-wicket haul in T20Is.
