= 2023 Netherlands Women's Tri-Nation Series =

The 2023 Netherlands Women's Tri-Nation Series was a Twenty20 International (T20I) series which took place in the Netherlands in July 2023. The series was contested by Netherlands, Scotland and Thailand. All the matches of the series were played at Sportpark Maarschalkerweerd in Utrecht. Thailand won the tri-series on net run rate after all three sides earned two wins and two defeats.

Ahead of the tri-nation series, Netherlands and Thailand played a three-match bilateral One Day International (ODI) series at the VRA Cricket Ground in Amstelveen. The second match was abandoned due to rain, and the ODI series was tied 1–1.

== Bilateral ODI series ==
Thailand women's cricket team in the Netherlands in 2023
	Netherlands	Thailand
- Dates: 3 July 2023 – 7 July 2023
Captains	Heather Siegers	Naruemol Chaiwai

One Day International series
- Results: 3-match series drawn 1–1
Most runs	Robine Rijke (86)	Natthakan Chantam (129)
Most wickets	Iris Zwilling (5)	Onnicha Kamchomphu (5)

=== Squads ===
Netherlands	Thailand
Heather Siegers (c); Caroline de Lange; Babette de Leede (wk); Merel Dekeling; Sterre Kalis; Hannah Landheer; Eva Lynch; Phebe Molkenboer; Frederique Overdijk; Robine Rijke; Isabel van der Woning; Robyn van Oosterom; Jolien van Vliet (wk); Iris Zwilling; Mikkie Zwilling	Naruemol Chaiwai (c, wk); Nattaya Boochatham; Nanthita Boonsukham; Natthakan Chantam; Sunida Chaturongrattana; Onnicha Kamchomphu; Rosenanee Kanoh; Suwanan Khiaoto (wk); Nannapat Koncharoenkai (wk); Banthida Leephatthana (wk); Phannita Maya; Thipatcha Putthawong; Chanida Sutthiruang; Sornnarin Tippoch

=== ODI series ===
==== 1st ODI ====
3 July 2023
11:00
Scorecard

Netherlands; 204 (48.1 overs)	v	Thailand; 147 (36.4 overs)
Robine Rijke 83 (78); Nattaya Boochatham 2/25 (9 overs)		Natthakan Chantam 65 (93); Iris Zwilling 3/22 (9.4 overs)

Netherlands won by 57 runs
VRA Cricket Ground, Amstelveen
Umpires: Nitin Bathi (Ned) and Jacques Westerberg (Ned)
Player of the match: Robine Rijke (Ned)

- Thailand won the toss and elected to field.
- Phebe Molkenboer (Ned) made her ODI debut.

==== 2nd ODI ====
5 July 2023
11:00
Scorecard

Netherlands	v	Thailand

Match abandoned
VRA Cricket Ground, Amstelveen
Umpires: Rizwan Akram (Ned) and Jacques Westerberg (Ned)

- No toss.
- No play was possible due to rain.

==== 3rd ODI ====
7 July 2023
11:00
Scorecard

Thailand; 187/9 (50 overs)	v	Netherlands; 63 (27.5 overs)
Natthakan Chantam 64 (115); Eva Lynch 3/29 (8 overs)		Iris Zwilling 32 (63); Onnicha Kamchomphu 3/2 (2.5 overs)

Thailand won by 124 runs
VRA Cricket Ground, Amstelveen
Umpires: Rizwan Akram (Ned) and Pim van Liemt (Ned)
Player of the match: Onnicha Kamchomphu (Tha)

- Netherlands won the toss and elected to field.
- Suwanan Khiaoto (Tha) made her ODI debut.

== Tri-Nation T20I series ==
2023 Netherlands T20I Tri-Nation Series
- Date: 10 July 2023 – 15 July 2023
- Location: Netherlands
- Result: Thailand won the series
Teams
Netherlands	Scotland	Thailand
Captains
Heather Siegers	Kathryn Bryce (Note: Abtaha Maqsood captained Scotland in their first two matches of the series.)	Naruemol Chaiwai
Most runs
Heather Siegers (101)	Darcey Carter (85)	Suwanan Khiaoto (75)
Most wickets
Robine Rijke (8)	Kathryn Bryce (5); Abtaha Maqsood (5)	Thipatcha Putthawong (8)

=== Squads ===
Netherlands	Scotland	Thailand
Heather Siegers (c); Caroline de Lange; Babette de Leede (wk); Sterre Kalis; Hannah Landheer; Eva Lynch; Phebe Molkenboer; Frederique Overdijk; Robine Rijke; Annemijn Thomson; Isabel van der Woning; Robyn van Oosterom; Jolien van Vliet (wk); Iris Zwilling; Mikkie Zwilling	Kathryn Bryce (c); Sarah Bryce (vc, wk); Chloe Abel; ~~Olivia Bell~~; Darcey Carter; Priyanaz Chatterji; ~~Katherine Fraser~~; Samantha Haggo; Lorna Jack; Ailsa Lister (wk); Abtaha Maqsood; Megan McColl; Hannah Rainey; Nayma Sheikh; Rachel Slater; Emma Walsingham; Ellen Watson	Naruemol Chaiwai (c, wk); Nattaya Boochatham; Nanthita Boonsukham; Natthakan Chantam; Sunida Chaturongrattana; Onnicha Kamchomphu; Rosenanee Kanoh; Suwanan Khiaoto (wk); Nannapat Koncharoenkai (wk); Banthida Leephatthana (wk); Phannita Maya; Thipatcha Putthawong; Chanida Sutthiruang; Sornnarin Tippoch

Olivia Bell and Katherine Fraser were ruled out of Scotland's squad before the start of the series due to injuries, with Nayma Sheikh and Emma Walsingham being named as their replacements.

=== Points table ===
Pos	Team	Pld	W	L	T	NR	Pts	NRR
1	Thailand	4	2	2	0	0	4	0.767
2	Netherlands	4	2	2	0	0	4	−0.148
3	Scotland	4	2	2	0	0	4	−0.593

Source: ESPNcricinfo

=== Fixtures ===
10 July 2023
14:00
Scorecard

Scotland; 65 (19.1 overs)	v	Thailand; 66/2 (10.2 overs)
Ailsa Lister 21 (13); Chanida Sutthiruang 3/3 (3.1 overs)		Natthakan Chantam 26 (24); Abtaha Maqsood 1/8 (1 over)

Thailand won by 8 wickets
Sportpark Maarschalkerweerd, Utrecht
Umpires: Nitin Bathi (Ned) and Maulik Prabhudesai (Ned)
Player of the match: Chanida Sutthiruang (Tha)

- Thailand won the toss and elected to field.
- Darcey Carter and Nayma Sheikh (Sco) both made their T20I debuts.

11 July 2023
14:00
Scorecard

Thailand; 92 (19.5 overs)	v	Netherlands; 95/4 (18.1 overs)
Nannapat Koncharoenkai 18 (17); Iris Zwilling 2/13 (4 overs)		Heather Siegers 49* (51); Thipatcha Putthawong 1/14 (4 overs)

Netherlands won by 6 wickets
Sportpark Maarschalkerweerd, Utrecht
Umpires: Rizwan Akram (Ned) and Martin Hancock (Ned)
Player of the match: Heather Siegers (Ned)

- Netherlands won the toss and elected to field.
- Phebe Molkenboer (Ned) made her T20I debut.

12 July 2023
14:00
Scorecard

Scotland; 110/8 (20 overs)	v	Netherlands; 104/8 (20 overs)
Darcey Carter 53* (52); Eva Lynch 2/13 (4 overs)		Sterre Kalis 29 (28); Hannah Rainey 3/15 (4 overs)

Scotland won by 6 runs
Sportpark Maarschalkerweerd, Utrecht
Umpires: Nitin Bathi (Ned) and Maulik Prabhudesai (Ned)
Player of the match: Darcey Carter (Sco)

- Netherlands won the toss and elected to field.

13 July 2023
14:00
Scorecard

Thailand; 102/6 (20 overs)	v	Scotland; 106/4 (17.4 overs)
Nannapat Koncharoenkai 28 (32); Kathryn Bryce 3/21 (4 overs)		Sarah Bryce 36 (34); Thipatcha Putthawong 2/16 (4 overs)

Scotland won by 6 wickets
Sportpark Maarschalkerweerd, Utrecht
Umpires: Rizwan Akram (Ned) and Maulik Prabhudesai (Ned)
Player of the match: Kathryn Bryce (Sco)

- Scotland won the toss and elected to field.

14 July 2023
14:00
Scorecard

Netherlands; 75 (17.5 overs)	v	Thailand; 76/2 (13.3 overs)
Sterre Kalis 51* (49); Thipatcha Putthawong 5/8 (3.5 overs)		Suwanan Khiaoto 28 (30); Mikkie Zwilling 1/11 (1 overs)

Thailand won by 8 wickets
Sportpark Maarschalkerweerd, Utrecht
Umpires: Nitin Bathi (Ned) and Pim van Liemt (Ned)
Player of the match: Thipatcha Putthawong (Tha)

- Thailand won the toss and elected to field.
- Thipatcha Putthawong (Tha) took her first hat-trick (including four wickets in four balls) and five-wicket haul in T20Is.

15 July 2023
14:00
Scorecard

Scotland; 79 (18.5 overs)	v	Netherlands; 80/3 (17 overs)
Darcey Carter 24 (22); Robine Rijke 4/11 (4 overs)		Heather Siegers 40* (49); Kathryn Bryce 2/14 (4 overs)

Netherlands won by 7 wickets
Sportpark Maarschalkerweerd, Utrecht
Umpires: Rizwan Akram (Ned) and Martin Hancock (Ned)
Player of the match: Robine Rijke (Ned)

- Netherlands won the toss and elected to field.
