= Netherlands women's cricket team in Scotland in 2026 =

International cricket tour

	Scotland	Netherlands
- Dates: 28 August – 1 September 2026
Captains	Abtaha Maqsood; Sarah Bryce	Babette de Leede

One Day International series
- Results: 3-match series drawn 1–1
Most runs	Pippa Sproul (79)	Babette de Leede (127)
Most wickets	Abtaha Maqsood (4)	Silver Siegers (3)

The Netherlands women's cricket team toured Scotland in August 2026 to play three One Day International (ODI) matches. The fixtures were confirmed by Cricket Scotland (CS) on 12 August 2026.

This was the first bilateral series between the two teams. Netherlands women had last toured Scotland in 2026, as part of the 2026 Scotland Women's Tri-Nation Series.

== Squads ==
Scotland	Netherlands
Ammy Baldie; Sarah Bryce (wk); Darcey Carter (wk); Maryam Faisal; Gabriella Fontenla; Katherine Fraser; Maisie Maceira; Abtaha Maqsood; Megan McColl; Rebecca McCrossan; Charlotte Nevard; Niamh Robertson-Jack; Nayma Sheikh; Pippa Sproul (wk); Ellen Watson; Isabella Watson	Babette de Leede (c, wk); Merel Dekeling; Caroline de Lange; Sanya Khurana; Hannah Landheer; Rosalie Ann Lawrence (wk); Lara Leemhuis; Noa Mais; Phebe Molkenboer; Frederique Overdijk; Robine Rijke; Silver Siegers; Myrthe van den Raad; Carlijn Van Koolwijk; Iris Zwilling

== ODI series ==
=== 1st ODI ===
28 August 2026
11:00
Scorecard

Netherlands; 270/4 (50 overs)	v	Scotland; 212 (48.5 overs)
Phebe Molkenboer 106 (144); Abtaha Maqsood 3/35 (10 overs)		Pippa Sproul 79 (102); Silver Siegers 3/42 (10 overs)

Netherlands won by 58 runs
Titwood, Glasgow
Umpires: Mark Jameson (Ger) and Iain McDonald (Sco)

- Scotland won the toss and elected to field.
- Maisie Maceira, Rebecca McCrossan, Charlotte Nevard, Niamh Robertson-Jack (Sco), Sanya Khurana and Myrthe van den Raad (Ned) all made their ODI debuts.
- Phebe Molkenboer (Ned) scored her first century in ODIs.

=== 2nd ODI ===
30–31 August 2026
11:00
Scorecard

Netherlands; 129/9 (32 overs)	v	Scotland; 130/1 (16.2 overs)
Babette de Leede 58 (64); Abtaha Maqsood 3/17 (6 overs)		Sarah Bryce 70* (59); Myrthe van den Raad 1/21 (2 overs)

Scotland won by 9 wickets
New Williamfield, Stirling
Umpires: Mark Jameson (Ger) and Srinidhi Ravindra (Fin)

- Scotland won the toss and elected to field.
- Reserve day used due to rain.
- The match was reduced to 32 overs per side due to wet outfield.
- Ammy Baldie (Sco), Merel Dekeling, Rosalie Ann Lawrence and Lara Leemhuis (Ned) all made their ODI debuts.

=== 3rd ODI ===
1 September 2026
11:00
Scorecard

Scotland	v	Netherlands

Match abandoned
New Williamfield, Stirling
Umpires: Iain McDonald (Sco) and Srinidhi Ravindra (Fin)

- No toss.
- No play was possible due to rain.
