= Ireland women's cricket team in the Netherlands in 2022 =

International cricket tour

| | Netherlands women | Ireland women |
- Dates: 22 – 26 August 2022
| Captains | Babette de Leede | Laura Delany |

One Day International series
- Results: Ireland women won the 3-match series 3–0
| Most runs | Frederique Overdijk (86) | Leah Paul (173) |
| Most wickets | Iris Zwilling (4) | Cara Murray (8) |

The Ireland women's cricket team toured the Netherlands to play against the Netherlands women's cricket team in August 2022. The series consisted of three Women's One Day Internationals (WODIs), with two matches played at the VRA Ground in Amstelveen and one match at Sportpark Westvliet in The Hague. These were the first WODI matches played by the Netherlands Women since 2011, after the International Cricket Council granted them ODI status in May 2022.

Ireland won the first match of the series after bowling the hosts out for just 84 runs. Ireland dominated the second game of the series, setting Irish WODI records including highest total (337/8), highest partnership (236 between Leah Paul and Laura Delany), highest individual score (137 for Leah Paul) and highest margin of victory (210 runs). Ireland wrapped up a clean sweep of the series, winning the final game by 8 wickets.

== Squads ==
| Netherlands | Ireland |
|---|---|
| Babette de Leede (c, wk); Gwen Bloemen; Caroline de Lange; Eva Lynch; Phebe Molkenboer; Frederique Overdijk; Juliët Post; Robine Rijke; Silver Siegers; Annemijn Thomson; Annemijn van Beuge; Isabel van der Woning; Robyn van Oosterom; Jolien van Vliet; Iris Zwilling; Mikkie Zwilling | Laura Delany (c); Rachel Delaney; Georgina Dempsey; Amy Hunter; Shauna Kavanagh; Arlene Kelly; Gaby Lewis; Louise Little; Sophie MacMahon; Kate McEvoy; Cara Murray; Leah Paul; Orla Prendergast; Mary Waldron (wk) |

== WODI series ==
=== 1st WODI ===
22 August 2022
11:00
Scorecard

| Netherlands; 84 (32.5 overs) | v | Ireland; 87/5 (19.3 overs) |
| Frederique Overdijk 38* (65); Arlene Kelly 3/9 (7 overs) | | Gaby Lewis 25 (32); Silver Siegers 2/10 (3 overs) |

Ireland Women won by 5 wickets
VRA Ground, Amstelveen
Umpires: Martin Hancock (Ned) and Adriaan van den Dries (Ned)

- Ireland Women won the toss and elected to field.
- Gwen Bloemen, Babette de Leede, Eva Lynch, Frederique Overdijk, Juliët Post, Robine Rijke, Silver Siegers, Annemijn van Beuge, Isabel van der Woning, Jolien van Vliet and Iris Zwilling (Ned) all made their WODI debuts.

=== 2nd WODI ===
24 August 2022
11:00
Scorecard

| Ireland; 337/8 (50 overs) | v | Netherlands; 127 (33.2 overs) |
| Leah Paul 137 (138); Frederique Overdijk 2/57 (9 overs) | | Annemijn van Beuge 26 (18); Cara Murray 5/39 (10 overs) |

Ireland Women won by 210 runs
VRA Ground, Amstelveen
Umpires: Nitin Bathi (Ned) and Martin Hancock (Ned)

- Netherlands Women won the toss and elected to field.
- Caroline de Lange (Ned) made her WODI debut.
- Ireland's total of 337/8 was their highest in WODIs.
- Leah Paul and Laura Delany (Ire) both scored their first century in a WODI, with Paul's 137 setting a new record for highest individual score for Ireland.
- The partnership between Paul and Delany (236) was a record for Ireland and the second highest third-wicket partnership in all WODIs.
- Ireland's victory by 210 runs was their highest winning margin (by runs) in WODIs.

=== 3rd WODI ===
26 August 2022
11:00
Scorecard

| Netherlands; 185 (47.2 overs) | v | Ireland; 188/2 (35.3 overs) |
| Babette de Leede 76 (98); Laura Delany 3/26 (10 overs) | | Gaby Lewis 92 (98); Frederique Overdijk 1/24 (5 overs) |

Ireland Women won by 8 wickets
Sportpark Westvliet, The Hague
Umpires: Maulik Prabhudesai (Ned) and Adriaan van den Dries (Ned)

- Netherlands Women won the toss and elected to bat.
- Robyn van Oosterom (Ned) made her WODI debut.
- Gaby Lewis played her 100th international match for Ireland.
