= Netherlands women's cricket team in Ireland in 2021 =

International cricket tour

	Ireland women	Netherlands women
- Dates: 26 – 30 July 2021
Captains	Laura Delany	Heather Siegers

Twenty20 International series
- Results: Ireland women won the 4-match series 2–1
Most runs	Laura Delany (115)	Miranda Veringmeier (122)
Most wickets	Lara Maritz (4)	Eva Lynch (3); Frederique Overdijk (3); Silver Siegers (3)
- Player of the series: Miranda Veringmeier (Ned)

The Ireland women's cricket team played the Netherlands women's cricket team in July 2021. The tour consisted of four Women's Twenty20 International (WT20I) matches, with all the fixtures being played at Malahide Cricket Ground, Dublin. Ireland's last international matches were in May 2021 against Scotland, while the Netherlands last played an international match in August 2019. Heather Siegers was named as the captain of the Dutch team for the series, replacing Juliët Post.

Ireland won the first match of the series by 28 runs. The second match of the series was originally scheduled to take place on 27 July 2021, but was moved to the reserve day after no play was possible due to rain. However, no play was possible on the reserve day either, with the match being abandoned due to the weather. Ireland won the third match by six wickets to win the series with a game to play. In the match, Ireland's Laura Delany broke the captaincy record for her team, leading them for the 63rd time, passing Isobel Joyce's record of 62 matches as captain. The Netherlands won the fourth match by seven wickets, to record their first ever win against Ireland in WT20I cricket, with Ireland winning the series 2–1.

== Squads ==
WT20Is
Ireland	Netherlands
Laura Delany (c); Ava Canning; Rachel Delaney; Georgina Dempsey; Shauna Kavanagh; Gaby Lewis; Lara Maritz; Sophie MacMahon; Leah Paul; Orla Prendergast; Celeste Raack; Eimear Richardson; Rebecca Stokell; Mary Waldron	Heather Siegers (c); Babette de Leede (vc); Julia Corder; Hannah Landheer; Eva Lynch; Frederique Overdijk; Juliët Post; Robine Rijke; Silver Siegers; Annemijn Thomson; Annemijn van Beuge; Isabel van der Woning; Miranda Veringmeier; Iris Zwilling

Amy Hunter was also named in Ireland's squad as a COVID-19 reserve.

== WT20I series ==
=== 1st WT20I ===
26 July 2021
16:00
Scorecard

Ireland; 160/6 (20 overs)	v	Netherlands; 132/7 (20 overs)
Laura Delany 61 (43); Eva Lynch 2/14 (3 overs)		Miranda Veringmeier 33 (15); Lara Maritz 3/13 (3 overs)

Ireland Women won by 28 runs
Malahide Cricket Ground, Dublin
Umpires: Azam Baig (Ire) and Jareth McCready (Ire)
Player of the match: Laura Delany (Ire)

- Netherlands Women won the toss and elected to field.
- Isabel van der Woning (Ned) made her WT20I debut.

=== 2nd WT20I ===
27–28 July 2021
16:00
Scorecard

Ireland	v	Netherlands

Match abandoned
Malahide Cricket Ground, Dublin
Umpires: Azam Baig (Ire) and Aidan Seaver (Ire)

- No toss.
- No play was possible due to rain.

=== 3rd WT20I ===
29 July 2021
16:00
Scorecard

Netherlands; 109/5 (20 overs)	v	Ireland; 110/4 (11.2 overs)
Miranda Veringmeier 60 (50); Orla Prendergast 2/14 (4 overs)		Gaby Lewis 52* (29); Silver Siegers 2/24 (3 overs)

Ireland Women won by 6 wickets
Malahide Cricket Ground, Dublin
Umpires: Jareth McCready (Ire) and Aidan Seaver (Ire)
Player of the match: Gaby Lewis (Ire)

- Netherlands Women won the toss and elected to bat.

=== 4th WT20I ===
30 July 2021
16:00
Scorecard

Ireland; 101/2 (15 overs)	v	Netherlands; 119/3 (13.3 overs)
Rebecca Stokell 48 (43); Hannah Landheer 1/21 (2 overs)		Babette de Leede 62* (35); Celeste Raack 1/8 (1 over)

Netherlands Women won by 7 wickets (DLS method)
The Village, Dublin
Umpires: Azam Baig (Ire) and Aidan Seaver (Ire)
Player of the match: Babette de Leede (Ned)

- Netherlands Women won the toss and elected to field.
- Netherlands Women were set a revised target of 118 runs from 15 overs due to rain.
