= United States women's cricket team in the Netherlands in 2025 =

International cricket tour

	Netherlands	United States
- Dates: 7 – 13 June 2025
Captains	Babette de Leede	Aditiba Chudasama

Twenty20 International series
- Results: Netherlands won the 5-match series 4–0
Most runs	Sterre Kalis (142)	Aditiba Chudasama (72)
Most wickets	Silver Siegers (6)	Ritu Singh (6)

The United States women's cricket team toured the Netherlands in June 2025 to play the Netherlands women's cricket team. The tour consisted of five Twenty20 International (T20I) matches. In April 2025, the Royal Dutch Cricket Association (KNCB) confirmed the fixtures for the tour. It was the first ever bilateral series between the two sides.

== Squads ==
Netherlands	United States
Babette de Leede (c, wk); Caroline de Lange; Merel Dekeling; Lilli Hamilton; Sterre Kalis; Sanya Khurana; Hannah Landheer; Phebe Molkenboer; Frederique Overdijk; Robine Rijke; Heather Siegers (wk); Silver Siegers; Myrthe van den Raad; Isabel van der Woning; Iris Zwilling	Aditiba Chudasama (c); Chetna Pagydyala (vc); Jivana Aras; Gargi Bhogle; Disha Dhingra; Pooja Ganesh (wk); Saanvi Immadi; Geetika Kodali; Maahi Madhavan; Mitali Patwardhan (wk); Lekha Shetty; Ritu Singh; Suhani Thadani; Jessica Willathgamuwa

== Tour matches ==
3 June 2025
12:00
Scorecard

Netherlands XI; 133/6 (20 overs)	v	United States XI; 114 (19.3 overs)
Robine Rijke 47 (42); Lekha Shetty 2/14 (2 overs)		Ritu Singh 41 (41); Caroline de Lange 3/18 (4 overs)

Netherlands XI won by 19 runs
VRA Cricket Ground, Amstelveen
Umpires: Martin Hancock (Ned) and Danial Louw (Ned)

- Netherlands XI won the toss and elected to bat.

5 June 2025
12:00
Scorecard

Netherlands XI; 83/5 (17 overs)	v	United States XI
Rosalie Lawrence 31 (43); Suhani Thadani 3/13 (3 overs)

No result
VRA Cricket Ground, Amstelveen
Umpires: Martin Hancock (Ned) and Marieke Hommels (Ned)

- United States XI won the toss and elected to field.
- No further play was possible due to rain.

== T20I series ==
=== 1st T20I ===
7 June 2025
12:00
Scorecard

Netherlands	v	United States

Match abandoned
VRA Cricket Ground, Amstelveen
Umpires: Pim van Liemt (Ned) and Jacques Westerberg (Ned)

- No toss.
- No play was possible due to rain.

=== 2nd T20I ===
9–10 June 2025
12:00
Scorecard

Netherlands; 87/2 (10 overs)	v	United States; 71/5 (10 overs)
Babette de Leede 52* (35); Aditiba Chudasama 1/15 (2 overs)		Disha Dhingra 28 (26); Silver Siegers 2/13 (2 overs)

Netherlands won by 16 runs
Sportpark Maarschalkerweerd, Utrecht
Umpires: Maulik Prabhudesai (Ned) and Pim van Liemt (Ned)
Player of the match: Babette de Leede (Ned)

- United States won the toss and elected to field.
- No play was possible on 9 June and the match was reduced to 10 overs per side due to rain.
- Lilli Hamilton (Ned) and Lekha Shetty (USA) both made their T20I debuts.

=== 3rd T20I ===
11 June 2025
12:00
Scorecard

Netherlands; 128/4 (20 overs)	v	United States; 75 (16.3 overs)
Heather Siegers 54 (43); Ritu Singh 3/20 (4 overs)		Geetika Kodali 17 (12); Lilli Hamilton 3/13 (4 overs)

Netherlands won by 53 runs
Sportpark Maarschalkerweerd, Utrecht
Umpires: Jnanesh Kolli (Ned) and Maulik Prabhudesai (Ned)
Player of the match: Heather Siegers (Ned)

- United States won the toss and elected to field.

=== 4th T20I ===
12 June 2025
12:00
Scorecard

Netherlands; 164/5 (20 overs)	v	United States; 112/5 (20 overs)
Sterre Kalis 81* (60); Jivana Aras 3/18 (4 overs)		Aditiba Chudasama 60* (54); Iris Zwilling 2/17 (4 overs)

Netherlands won by 52 runs
Sportpark Maarschalkerweerd, Utrecht
Umpires: Pim van Liemt (Ned) and Jacques Westerberg (Ned)
Player of the match: Sterre Kalis (Ned)

- United States won the toss and elected to field.

=== 5th T20I ===
13 June 2025
12:00
Scorecard

Netherlands; 149/7 (20 overs)	v	United States; 74 (18 overs)
Babette de Leede 43 (33); Geetika Kodali 2/23 (3 overs)		Pooja Ganesh 17 (25); Iris Zwilling 3/11 (4 overs)

Netherlands won by 75 runs
Sportpark Maarschalkerweerd, Utrecht
Umpires: Maulik Prabhudesai (Ned) and Pim van Liemt (Ned)
Player of the match: Iris Zwilling (Ned)

- Netherlands won the toss and elected to bat.
- Mitali Patwardhan (USA) made her T20I debut.
