= 2019 Netherlands Women's Quadrangular Series =

International cricket tournament

- Dates: 8 – 14 August 2019
- Administrator: International Cricket Council
- Cricket format: WT20I
- Tournament format: Double round-robin
- Host: Netherlands
- Champions: Thailand
- Runners-up: Scotland
- Participants: 4
- Matches: 12
- Most runs: (Ireland) Gaby Lewis (180)
- Most wickets: (Thailand) Onnicha Kamchomphu (9) (Thailand) Nattaya Boochatham (9) (Scotland) Katherine Fraser (9)

The 2019 Netherlands Women's Quadrangular Series was a Women's Twenty20 International (WT20I) cricket tournament that was held in Deventer, Netherlands, from 8 to 14 August 2019. It took place ahead of the 2019 ICC Women's World Twenty20 Qualifier tournament in Scotland. The series was contested between the teams of Ireland, the Netherlands, Scotland and Thailand. All the matches took place at the Sportpark Het Schootsveld. Thailand won the series, after winning five of their six matches, with Scotland finishing second.

== Summary ==
The opening round of fixtures saw Ireland beat the Netherlands by 79 runs and Thailand beat Scotland by 74 runs. On the second day, both matches were affected by rain, and were decided by the Duckworth–Lewis–Stern (DLS) method. Scotland beat the Netherlands by five runs, to leave the hosts without a win from their first two matches. Thailand's match against Ireland was initially reduced to 14 overs, before another delay with the bowler's run-up reduced the game to 10 overs per side. Thailand eventually won the match, beating Ireland by four runs. The first Ireland-Scotland encounter saw Scotland win by eleven runs in a close match. It was Scotland's first win against Ireland since 2011. Thailand beat the Netherlands by eight wickets to remain unbeaten in the tournament ahead of the rest day, with the hosts winless from their three matches. Thailand's win was their 17th win in a row, breaking the previous record of 16 consecutive wins in WT20I cricket set by Australia.

The first match after the rest day was between Scotland and Thailand, with Scotland ending Thailand's unbeaten streak. Scotland's captain, Sarah Bryce, scored four runs off the final ball of the match, to beat Thailand by five wickets. In Ireland's match against the Netherlands, Ireland scored 213/4, their highest total in a WT20I match. However, the match ended in a no result, with rain during the Netherlands' run chase. The penultimate round of matches saw Scotland beat the Netherlands by 62 runs, by the DLS method, to win their fourth consecutive match. Thailand beat Ireland by seven wickets, in another rain-affected match. Onnicha Kamchomphu became the first bowler for Thailand to take a hat-trick in a WT20I match, finishing with three wickets for twelve runs from the two overs she bowled. The final day of fixtures started with Ireland beating Scotland by nine wickets, with Gaby Lewis and Kim Garth setting a new record for the highest partnership for any wicket by Ireland in a WT20I match, with an unbeaten 113 runs. The last match of the tournament saw Thailand beat the Netherlands by 93 runs, after the hosts only scored 40 runs in their run chase.

== Squads ==
Ireland	Netherlands	Scotland	Thailand
Laura Delany (c); Kim Garth; Shauna Kavanagh; Gaby Lewis; Louise Little; Hannah Little; Sophie MacMahon; Lara Maritz; Leah Paul; Orla Prendergast; Celeste Raack; Una Raymond-Hoey; Eimear Richardson; Rebecca Stokell; Mary Waldron (wk)	Juliët Post (c); Frederique van Arkel; Annemijn van Beuge; Leonie Bennett; Gwen Bloemen; Denise van Deventer; Sterre Kalis; Lisa Klokgieters; Caroline de Lange; Babette de Leede (wk); Eva Lynch; Frederique Overdijk; Robine Rijke; Silver Siegers; Annemijn Thomson; Miranda Veringmeier; Iris Zwilling; Mikkie Zwilling	Sarah Bryce (c, wk); Abbi Aitken; Priyanaz Chatterji; Katherine Fraser; Becky Glen; Samantha Haggo; Rachel Hawkins; Abbie Hogg; Lorna Jack; Megan McColl; Katie McGill; Hannah Rainey; Charis Scott; Ellen Watson; Ruth Willis	Sornnarin Tippoch (c); Nattaya Boochatham; Naruemol Chaiwai; Natthakan Chantam; Onnicha Kamchomphu; Nannapat Koncharoenkai (wk); Suleeporn Laomi; Soraya Lateh; Wongpaka Liengprasert; Ratanaporn Padunglerd; Chanida Sutthiruang

== Points table ==
Pos	Team	Pld	W	L	T	NR	Pts	NRR
1	Thailand	6	5	1	0	0	10	2.509
2	Scotland	6	4	2	0	0	8	−0.385
3	Ireland	6	2	3	0	1	5	1.320
4	Netherlands (H)	6	0	5	0	1	1	−4.113

(H) Host

== Fixtures ==
8 August 2019
11:00
Scorecard

Ireland; 169/5 (20 overs)	v	Netherlands; 90/7 (20 overs)
Eimear Richardson 63* (41); Annemijn van Beuge 2/19 (4 overs)		Babette de Leede 50 (51); Eimear Richardson 2/7 (3 overs)

Ireland Women won by 79 runs
Sportpark Het Schootsveld, Deventer
Umpires: Ryan Milne (Sco) and Paul Reynolds (Ire)

- Netherlands Women won the toss and elected to field.
- Frederique van Arkel, Frederique Overdijk, Annemijn Thomson (Ned), Hannah Little, Leah Paul and Orla Prendergast (Ire) all made their WT20I debuts.

8 August 2019
15:30 (D/N)
Scorecard

Thailand; 129/3 (20 overs)	v	Scotland; 55 (15.4 overs)
Natthakan Chantam 60* (49); Katie McGill 2/28 (4 overs)		Lorna Jack 12 (16); Onnicha Kamchomphu 4/8 (3 overs)

Thailand Women won by 74 runs
Sportpark Het Schootsveld, Deventer
Umpires: Adriaan van den Dries (Ned) and Paul Reynolds (Ire)

- Thailand Women won the toss and elected to bat.

9 August 2019
11:00
Scorecard

Netherlands; 86/6 (16 overs)	v	Scotland; 41/0 (7 overs)
Robine Rijke 39 (35); Katherine Fraser 3/17 (4 overs)		Lorna Jack 28* (26)

Scotland Women won by 5 runs (DLS method)
Sportpark Het Schootsveld, Deventer
Umpires: Huub Jansen (Ned) and Paul Reynolds (Ire)

- Netherlands Women won the toss and elected to bat.
- Scotland Women were set a revised target of 37 runs from 7 overs due to rain.
- Mikkie Zwilling (Ned) and Ellen Watson (Sco) both made their WT20I debuts.

9 August 2019
15:30 (D/N)
Scorecard

Thailand; 54/4 (10 overs)	v	Ireland; 50/7 (10 overs)
Nannapat Koncharoenkai 18* (15); Eimear Richardson 1/4 (2 overs)		Shauna Kavanagh 12 (19); Nattaya Boochatham 3/18 (2 overs)

Thailand Women won by 4 runs (DLS method)
Sportpark Het Schootsveld, Deventer
Umpires: Huub Jansen (Ned) and Ryan Milne (Sco)

- Ireland Women won the toss and elected to field.
- Ireland Women were set a revised target of 55 runs from 10 overs due to rain.

10 August 2019
11:00
Scorecard

Netherlands; 54 (17.5 overs)	v	Thailand; 55/2 (8 overs)
Leonie Bennett 16 (25); Nattaya Boochatham 3/3 (2.5 overs)		Natthakan Chantam 42* (31); Iris Zwilling 2/10 (2 overs)

Thailand Women won by 8 wickets
Sportpark Het Schootsveld, Deventer
Umpires: Ryan Milne (Sco) and Paul Reynolds (Ire)

- Netherlands Women won the toss and elected to bat.
- Gwen Bloemen (Ned) made her WT20I debut.

10 August 2019
15:30 (D/N)
Scorecard

Scotland; 105/6 (20 overs)	v	Ireland; 94/7 (20 overs)
Lorna Jack 32 (55); Eimear Richardson 3/14 (4 overs)		Kim Garth 30 (37); Katherine Fraser 1/12 (4 overs)

Scotland Women won by 11 runs
Sportpark Het Schootsveld, Deventer
Umpires: Pim van Liemt (Ned) and Ryan Milne (Sco)

- Scotland Women won the toss and elected to bat.

12 August 2019
11:00
Scorecard

Thailand; 123/7 (20 overs)	v	Scotland; 126/5 (20 overs)
Chanida Sutthiruang 35 (36); Katherine Fraser 3/14 (4 overs)		Sarah Bryce 63* (57); Nattaya Boochatham 2/22 (4 overs)

Scotland Women won by 5 wickets
Sportpark Het Schootsveld, Deventer
Umpires: Ryan Milne (Sco) and Adriaan van den Dries (Ned)

- Scotland Women won the toss and elected to field.

12 August 2019
15:30 (D/N)
Scorecard

Ireland; 213/4 (20 overs)	v	Netherlands; 18/1 (2.4 overs)
Gaby Lewis 71 (41); Leonie Bennett 3/22 (4 overs)		Sterre Kalis 9 (9); Eimear Richardson 1/5 (0.4 overs)

No result
Sportpark Het Schootsveld, Deventer
Umpires: Adriaan van den Dries (Ned) and Paul Reynolds (Ire)

- Ireland Women won the toss and elected to bat.
- Rain during the Netherlands innings prevented any further play.

13 August 2019
11:00
Scorecard

Ireland; 87/8 (16.5 overs)	v	Thailand; 67/3 (10.2 overs)
Laura Delany 22 (25); Sornnarin Tippoch 3/10 (4 overs)		Natthakan Chantam 24* (27); Sophie MacMahon 2/13 (2 overs)

Thailand Women won by 7 wickets (DLS method)
Sportpark Het Schootsveld, Deventer
Umpires: Pim van Liemt (Ned) and Ryan Milne (Sco)

- Ireland Women won the toss and elected to bat.
- Thailand Women were set a revised target of 64 runs from 11 overs due to rain.
- Onnicha Kamchomphu (Tha) took a hat-trick.

13 August 2019
15:30 (D/N)
Scorecard

Scotland; 148/4 (20 overs)	v	Netherlands; 60/8 (13.3 overs)
Lorna Jack 54* (55); Leonie Bennett 1/24 (4 overs)		Sterre Kalis 12 (16); Megan McColl 3/22 (4 overs)

Scotland Women won by 62 runs (DLS method)
Sportpark Het Schootsveld, Deventer
Umpires: Pim van Liemt (Ned) and Paul Reynolds (Ire)

- Netherlands Women won the toss and elected to field.
- Netherlands Women were set a revised target of 123 run from 13.3 overs due to rain.

14 August 2019
10:30
Scorecard

Scotland; 126/7 (20 overs)	v	Ireland; 130/1 (13.1 overs)
Sarah Bryce 49 (41); Lara Maritz 3/4 (3 overs)		Gaby Lewis 65* (39); Katie McGill 1/16 (2.1 overs)

Ireland Women won by 9 wickets
Sportpark Het Schootsveld, Deventer
Umpires: Ryan Milne (Sco) and Paul Reynolds (Ire)

- Scotland Women won the toss and elected to bat.
- Abbie Hogg (Sco) made her WT20I debut.

14 August 2019
15:00 (D/N)
Scorecard

Thailand; 133/8 (20 overs)	v	Netherlands; 40 (12 overs)
Nannapat Koncharoenkai 57 (43); Mikkie Zwilling 3/8 (2 overs)		Robine Rijke 15 (16); Ratanaporn Padunglerd 3/5 (3 overs)

Thailand Women won by 93 runs
Sportpark Het Schootsveld, Deventer
Umpires: Adriaan van den Dries (Ned) and Huub Jansen (Ned)

- Netherlands Women won the toss and elected to field.
