= Ireland women's cricket team in the Netherlands in 2023 =

International cricket tour

| | Netherlands | Ireland |
- Dates: 14 – 17 August 2023
| Captains | Heather Siegers | Laura Delany |

Twenty20 International series
- Results: Ireland won the 3-match series 3–0
| Most runs | Iris Zwilling (71) | Amy Hunter (95) |
| Most wickets | Robine Rijke (4) | Arlene Kelly (10) |

The Ireland women's cricket team toured the Netherlands in August 2023 to play three Twenty20 International (T20I) matches. Cricket Ireland (CI) confirmed their summer schedule in March 2023, including the dates of this tour. All the matches of the series took place at the VRA Cricket Ground in Amstelveen.

Ireland won the series 3–0.

== Squads ==
| Netherlands | Ireland |
|---|---|
| Heather Siegers (c); Caroline de Lange; Babette de Leede (wk); Merel Dekeling; Hannah Landheer; Eva Lynch; Phebe Molkenboer; Frederique Overdijk; Robine Rijke; Isabel van der Woning; Carlijn van Koolwijk; Fenna Vermeire; Mikkie Zwilling; Iris Zwilling | Laura Delany (c); Ava Canning; Georgina Dempsey; Amy Hunter (wk); Shauna Kavanagh (wk); Arlene Kelly; Gaby Lewis; Louise Little; Sophie MacMahon; ~~Aimee Maguire~~; Jane Maguire; Cara Murray; Orla Prendergast; Freya Sargent; Rebecca Stokell |

Ireland added Sophie MacMahon to their squad after the first T20I, replacing Aimee Maguire who was ruled out due to an injury.

== T20I series ==
=== 1st T20I ===
14 August 2023
14:00
Scorecard

| Netherlands; 92/9 (20 overs) | v | Ireland; 96/0 (13.1 overs) |
| Robine Rijke 38 (35); Arlene Kelly 5/12 (4 overs) | | Amy Hunter 49* (42) |

Ireland won by 10 wickets
VRA Cricket Ground, Amstelveen
Umpires: Pim van Liemt (Ned) and Jacques Westerberg (Ned)
Player of the match: Arlene Kelly (Ire)

- Ireland won the toss and elected to field.
- Merel Dekeling, Carlijn van Koolwijk (Ned) and Freya Sargent (Ire) all made their T20I debuts.
- Arlene Kelly became the first cricketer for Ireland to take a five-wicket haul in women's T20Is.

=== 2nd T20I ===
16 August 2023
14:00
Scorecard

| Ireland; 148/6 (20 overs) | v | Netherlands; 82 (15.5 overs) |
| Amy Hunter 36 (34); Robine Rijke 3/37 (4 overs) | | Babette de Leede 21 (26); Laura Delany 3/5 (3 overs) |

Ireland won by 66 runs
VRA Cricket Ground, Amstelveen
Umpires: Rizwan Akram (Ned) and Pim van Liemt (Ned)
Player of the match: Laura Delany (Ire)

- Netherlands won the toss and elected to field.

=== 3rd T20I ===
17 August 2023
14:00
Scorecard

| Netherlands; 116/6 (20 overs) | v | Ireland; 119/4 (19.1 overs) |
| Iris Zwilling 56 (58); Arlene Kelly 2/20 (4 overs) | | Rebecca Stokell 33* (37); Robine Rijke 1/14 (3.1 overs) |

Ireland won by 6 wickets
VRA Cricket Ground, Amstelveen
Umpires: Rizwan Akram (Ned) and Jacques Westerberg (Ned)
Player of the match: Rebecca Stokell (Ire)

- Netherlands won the toss and elected to bat.
