= Charis Scott =

Scottish cricketer (born 2002)

Personal information
- Full name: Charis Mary Scott
- Born: 14 May 2002 (age 24); Galashiels, Selkirkshire, Scotland
- Batting: Right-handed
- Bowling: Right-arm offbreak

International information
- National side: Scotland
- T20I debut (cap 16): 29 June 2019 v Germany
- Last T20I: 23 January 2022 v Bangladesh
- Source: Cricinfo, 23 January 2022

Charis Scott (born 14 May 2002) is a Scottish cricketer. In May 2019, she was named in Scotland's squad for the 2019 ICC Women's Qualifier Europe tournament in Spain. She made her Women's Twenty20 International (WT20I) debut for Scotland against Germany on 29 June 2019. In August 2019, she was named in Scotland's squad for the 2019 Netherlands Women's Quadrangular Series. She played in Scotland's first match of the series, against Thailand on 8 August 2019.

In January 2022, she was named in Scotland's team for the 2022 Commonwealth Games Cricket Qualifier tournament in Malaysia.
