= 2022 Commonwealth Games Cricket Qualifier =

International Cricket tournament

2022 Commonwealth Games Qualifier
- Dates: 18 – 24 January 2022
- Cricket format: Women's Twenty20 International
- Tournament format: Round-robin
- Host: Malaysia
- Champions: Sri Lanka
- Runners-up: Bangladesh
- Participants: 5
- Matches: 10
- Player of the series: (Sri Lanka) Chamari Athapaththu
- Most runs: (Sri Lanka) Chamari Athapaththu (221)
- Most wickets: (Bangladesh) Nahida Akter (10)

The 2022 Commonwealth Games Qualifier was a cricket tournament played in Malaysia in January 2022. Five national teams competed for one place in the cricket tournament at the 2022 Commonwealth Games, in Birmingham, England, from July to August 2022. Matches in the qualification tournament were played as Women's Twenty20 Internationals (WT20Is).

In November 2020, the ICC announced the qualification process for the 2022 Commonwealth Games tournament. England automatically qualified as the hosts, and were joined by the six highest ranked sides as of 1 April 2021. The final place was decided by the Commonwealth Games Qualifier tournament.

Sri Lanka and Bangladesh both won their first three matches to set up a winner-takes-all contest on the last day of the event. Sri Lanka defeated Bangladesh by 22 runs to claim a place at the Commonwealth Games tournament. Sri Lankan captain Chamari Athapaththu was named as player of the series.

== Squads ==
Bangladesh	Kenya	Malaysia	Scotland	Sri Lanka
Nigar Sultana (c, wk); Rumana Ahmed; Sharmin Akhter; Nahida Akter; Sanjida Akter Meghla; Suraiya Azmin; Fargana Hoque; Fahima Khatun; Murshida Khatun; Salma Khatun; Lata Mondal; Ritu Moni; Sobhana Mostary; Shamima Sultana (wk); Fariha Trisna	Margaret Ngoche (c); Queentor Abel; Veronica Abuga; Ruth Achando (wk); Lavendah Idambo; Sharon Juma (wk); Sylvia Kinyua; Mary Mwangi; Monicah Ndhambi; Daisy Njoroge; Mercyline Ochieng; Flavia Odhiambo; Venasa Ooko; Jane Otieno; Esther Wachira; Sarah Wetoto	Winifred Duraisingam (c); Nik Nur Atiela; Sasha Azmi; Aisya Eleesa; Mas Elysa; Ainna Hamizah Hashim; Jamahidaya Intan; Wan Julia (wk); Dhanusri Muhunan; Nurilyaa Natasya; Nur Arianna Natsya; Amalin Sorfina; Nur Dania Syuhada; Yusrina Yaakop; Wan Nor Zulaika	Kathryn Bryce (c); Abbi Aitken-Drummond; Sarah Bryce (wk); Priyanaz Chatterji; Katherine Fraser; Lorna Jack; Ailsa Lister; Abtaha Maqsood; Megan McColl; Katie McGill; Hannah Rainey; Charis Scott; Rachel Slater; Ellen Watson	Chamari Athapaththu (c); Harshitha Samarawickrama (vc); Nilakshi de Silva; Kavisha Dilhari; Vishmi Gunaratne; Ama Kanchana; Achini Kulasuriya; Sugandika Kumari; Sachini Nisansala; Hasini Perera; Udeshika Prabodhani; Oshadi Ranasinghe; Inoka Ranaweera; Anushka Sanjeewani (wk); Tharika Sewwandi; Prasadani Weerakkody

Scotland also named Orla Montgomery as a non-travelling reserve player. Sri Lanka also named Madushika Methtananda, Kawya Kavindi, Imesha Dulani and Sathya Sandeepani as standby players. Bangladesh named Jahanara Alam, Nuzhat Tasnia, Khadija Tul Kubra as standby players.

== Warm-up matches ==
15 January 2022
09:30
Scorecard

Scotland; 187/4 (20 overs)	v	Malaysia; 62 (17.1 overs)
Sarah Bryce 81 (41); Ainna Hamizah Hashim 1/2 (1 over)		Nurilyaa Natasya 17 (36); Abbi Aitken-Drummond 3/16 (3 overs)

Scotland won by 125 runs
Kinrara Academy Oval, Kuala Lumpur

- Scotland won the toss and elected to bat.

16 January 2022
09:30
Scorecard

Sri Lanka; 166/7 (20 overs)	v	Malaysia; 82/7 (20 overs)
Vishmi Gunaratne 35 (29); Wan Nor Zulaika 1/18 (3 overs)		Mas Elysa 32 (30); Inoka Ranaweera 2/3 (2 overs)

Sri Lanka won by 84 runs
Kinrara Academy Oval, Kuala Lumpur
Umpires: Viswanadan Kalidas (Mas) and Shiju Sam (UAE)

- Sri Lanka won the toss and elected to bat.

16 January 2022
13:15
Scorecard

Bangladesh; 148/5 (20 overs)	v	Scotland; 136/7 (20 overs)
Nigar Sultana 30 (26); Katherine Fraser 2/16 (4 overs)		Kathryn Bryce 56 (43); Rumana Ahmed 3/18 (4 overs)

Bangladesh won by 12 runs
Kinrara Academy Oval, Kuala Lumpur
Umpires: Viswanadan Kalidas (Mas) and Shiju Sam (UAE)

- Scotland won the toss and elected to field.

== Points table ==
Pos	Team	Pld	W	L	NR	Pts	NRR
1	Sri Lanka	4	4	0	0	8	3.924
2	Bangladesh	4	3	1	0	6	2.005
3	Scotland	4	2	2	0	4	−1.393
4	Malaysia	4	1	3	0	2	−2.521
5	Kenya	4	0	4	0	0	−2.651

Source: ESPN Cricinfo

Advanced to the Commonwealth Games cricket tournament

== Fixtures ==
18 January 2022
09:30
Scorecard

Malaysia; 49/9 (20 overs)	v	Bangladesh; 53/2 (8 overs)
Winifred Duraisingam 12 (31); Rumana Ahmed 2/4 (4 overs)		Shamima Sultana 28 (19); Nur Arianna Natsya 2/14 (2 overs)

Bangladesh won by 8 wickets
Kinrara Academy Oval, Kuala Lumpur
Umpires: Vinod Babu (Oma) and Shiju Sam (UAE)
Player of the match: Rumana Ahmed (Ban)

- Bangladesh won the toss and elected to field.
- Nurilyaa Natasya, Nur Dania Syuhada (Mas) and Suraiya Azmin (Ban) all made their WT20I debuts.

18 January 2022
13:15
Scorecard

Sri Lanka; 182/4 (20 overs)	v	Scotland; 73 (12.1 overs)
Chamari Athapaththu 86 (45); Katie McGill 1/4 (1 over)		Ellen Watson 30* (26); Sachini Nisansala 2/10 (2.1 overs)

Sri Lanka won by 109 runs
Kinrara Academy Oval, Kuala Lumpur
Umpires: Viswanadan Kalidas (Mas) and Shiju Sam (UAE)
Player of the match: Chamari Athapaththu (SL)

- Sri Lanka won the toss and elected to bat.
- Vishmi Gunaratne, Sachini Nisansala (SL) and Rachel Slater (Sco) all made their WT20I debuts.

19 January 2022
09:30
Scorecard

Bangladesh; 125/6 (20 overs)	v	Kenya; 45 (12.4 overs)
Ritu Moni 39* (34); Queentor Abel 3/14 (4 overs)		Sharon Juma 24 (20); Nahida Akter 5/12 (3.4 overs)

Bangladesh won by 80 runs
Kinrara Academy Oval, Kuala Lumpur
Umpires: Vinod Babu (Oma) and Viswanadan Kalidas (Mas)
Player of the match: Nahida Akter (Ban)

- Kenya won the toss and elected to field.
- Nahida Akter (Ban) took her first five-wicket haul in WT20Is.
- The unbeaten 75-run partnership between Salma Khatun and Ritu Moni for Bangladesh was the highest seventh wicket partnership in WT20Is.

19 January 2022
13:15
Scorecard

Scotland; 148/5 (20 overs)	v	Malaysia; 117/8 (20 overs)
Kathryn Bryce 62* (46); Nik Nur Atiela 2/25 (3 overs)		Jamahidaya Intan 24 (31); Katherine Fraser 4/19 (4 overs)

Scotland won by 31 runs
Kinrara Academy Oval, Kuala Lumpur
Umpires: Vinod Babu (Oma) and Shiju Sam (UAE)
Player of the match: Kathryn Bryce (Sco)

- Scotland won the toss and elected to bat.

20 January 2022
09:30
Scorecard

Kenya; 87/6 (20 overs)	v	Sri Lanka; 89/1 (9.3 overs)
Queentor Abel 33 (53); Chamari Athapaththu 1/10 (3 overs)		Chamari Athapaththu 57 (29); Esther Wachira 1/4 (1 over)

Sri Lanka won by 9 wickets
Kinrara Academy Oval, Kuala Lumpur
Umpires: Viswanadan Kalidas (Mas) and Shiju Sam (UAE)
Player of the match: Chamari Athapaththu (SL)

- Sri Lanka won the toss and elected to field.
- Tharika Sewwandi (SL) made her WT20I debut.

22 January 2022
09:30
Scorecard

Scotland; 70/3 (8 overs)	v	Kenya; 54/3 (8 overs)
Kathryn Bryce 26 (19); Lavendah Idambo 1/8 (1 over)		Sarah Wetoto 24* (16); Katherine Fraser 2/17 (2 overs)

Scotland won by 16 runs
Kinrara Academy Oval, Kuala Lumpur
Umpires: Narayanan Janani (Ind) and Viswanadan Kalidas (Mas)
Player of the match: Kathryn Bryce (Sco)

- Kenya won the toss and elected to field.
- The match was reduced to 8 overs per side due to rain.

22 January 2022
13:15
Scorecard

Sri Lanka; 175/3 (20 overs)	v	Malaysia; 82/7 (20 overs)
Harshitha Samarawickrama 65* (42); Nik Nur Atiela 1/21 (2 overs)		Winifred Duraisingam 42* (54); Sugandika Kumari 2/12 (4 overs)

Sri Lanka won by 93 runs
Kinrara Academy Oval, Kuala Lumpur
Umpires: Narayanan Janani (Ind) and Shiju Sam (UAE)
Player of the match: Harshitha Samarawickrama (SL)

- Malaysia won the toss and elected to field.

23 January 2022
09:30
Scorecard

Scotland; 77 (17.3 overs)	v	Bangladesh; 78/1 (15.2 overs)
Sarah Bryce 29 (32); Salma Khatun 2/9 (3 overs)		Murshida Khatun 50* (55); Kathryn Bryce 1/12 (4 overs)

Bangladesh won by 9 wickets
Kinrara Academy Oval, Kuala Lumpur
Umpires: Narayanan Janani (Ind) and Viswanadan Kalidas (Mas)
Player of the match: Murshida Khatun (Ban)

- Scotland won the toss and elected to bat.

23 January 2022
13:15
Scorecard

Kenya; 88/6 (20 overs)	v	Malaysia; 89/5 (18.2 overs)
Mary Mwangi 23 (37); Mas Elysa 2/19 (4 overs)		Mas Elysa 37 (26); Flavia Odhiambo 1/9 (1.2 overs)

Malaysia won by 5 wickets
Kinrara Academy Oval, Kuala Lumpur
Umpires: Vinod Babu (Oma) and Narayanan Janani (Ind)
Player of the match: Mas Elysa (Mas)

- Kenya won the toss and elected to bat.

24 January 2022
09:30
Scorecard

Sri Lanka; 136/6 (20 overs)	v	Bangladesh; 114/5 (20 overs)
Chamari Athapaththu 48 (28); Nahida Akter 2/34 (4 overs)		Murshida Khatun 36 (36); Chamari Athapaththu 3/17 (4 overs)

Sri Lanka won by 22 runs
Kinrara Academy Oval, Kuala Lumpur
Umpires: Vinod Babu (Oma) and Shiju Sam (UAE)
Player of the match: Chamari Athapaththu (SL)

- Sri Lanka won the toss and elected to bat.
