= Abbie Hogg =

Scottish cricketer (born 2002)

Personal information
- Full name: Abbie Hogg
- Born: 22 August 2002 (age 24); Scotland
- Batting: Left-handed
- Bowling: Slow left-arm orthodox

International information
- National side: Scotland
- Only T20I (cap 18): 14 August 2019 v Ireland
- Source: Cricinfo, 15 August 2019

Abbie Hogg (born 22 August 2002) is a Scottish cricketer. In August 2019, she was named in the Scotland Women's Twenty20 International (WT20I) squad for the 2019 Netherlands Women's Quadrangular Series. She made her WT20I debut for Scotland, against Ireland, on 14 August 2019.
