= Nayma Sheikh =

Scottish cricketer (born 2006)

Personal information
- Full name: Nayma Mughis Sheikh
- Born: 4 March 2006 (age 20); Glasgow, Scotland
- Batting: Left-handed
- Bowling: Right-arm medium fast, leg break
- Role: All-rounder

International information
- National side: Scotland
- ODI debut (cap 30): 21 October 2023 v Ireland
- Last ODI: 12 April 2024 v Papua New Guinea
- T20I debut (cap 24): 10 July 2023 v Thailand
- Last T20I: 16 August 2024 v Netherlands

Career statistics
Competition	WODI	WT20I
Matches	2	7
Runs scored	10	6
Batting average	10.00	–
100s/50s	0/0	0/0
Top score	10	5*
Balls bowled	60	102
Wickets	1	6
Bowling average	25.00	13.66
5 wickets in innings	0	0
10 wickets in match	0	0
Best bowling	1/8	4/14
Catches/stumpings	0/–	0/–
- Source: Cricinfo, 16 April 2025

Nayma Mughis Sheikh (born 4 March 2006) is a Scottish cricketer who plays as an all-rounder for the national women's team.

== Early and personal life ==
She started her cricket career at the age of 12 years for the Western Warriors under-16 girls squad. She, her mother Moon Mughis Shaikh and her Father are involved in East Kilbride Cricket Club (EKCC). She was also a BA student with (Hons.) Accountancy at Glasgow Caledonian University (GCU). In 2023, she was received Young Scot Awards 2023 at Sunday Mail.

== International career ==
Sheikh was selected for the Scotland under-19 team at the 2023 Under-19 Women's T20 World Cup in South Africa, as part of the first Scotland squad to qualify for the tournament. She took Shafali Verma's wicket, it was the highlight of the tournament for her.

Sheikh made her Women's Twenty20 International debut for Scotland against Thailand in the 2023 Netherlands Women's Tri-Nation Series on 10 July 2023. In August 2023, she was selected for the 2023 Women's T20 World Cup Europe Qualifier. She then made her Women's One Day International debut during Scotland's series against Ireland, on 21 October 2023.

In March 2024, Sheikh was selected the national squad for the 2024 Women's T20 World Cup Qualifier. She took 4 wickets in a 27 runs win against Netherlands in a T20I match and got Player of the Match award 2024 Netherlands Women's Tri-Nation Series on 16 August 2024.

In December 2024, she was selected for the Scotland under-19 team at the 2025 Under-19 Women's T20 World Cup in Malaysia. In March 2025, she was selected for the Scotland squad for the 2025 Women's Cricket World Cup Qualifier in Pakistan.

She has not been picked for the National team as of recent, due to poor performances.
