= Suraiya Azmin =

Bangladeshi cricketer (born 1999)

Personal information
- Full name: Suraiya Azmin
- Born: 29 May 1999 (age 27); Joypurhat, Rajshahi, Bangladesh
- Batting: Right-handed
- Bowling: Right-arm medium
- Role: Bowler

International information
- National side: Bangladesh
- ODI debut (cap 26): 11 February 2017 v South Africa
- Last ODI: 14 May 2018 v South Africa
- T20I debut (cap 32): 18 January 2022 v Malaysia
- Last T20I: 24 January 2022 v Sri Lanka

Domestic team information
- Years: Team
- 2017–2017/18: Chittagong Division

Career statistics
Competition	WODI	WT20I
Matches	3	4
Runs scored	0	–
Batting average	0.00	–
100s/50s	0/0	–
Top score	0	–
Balls bowled	44	66
Wickets	2	6
Bowling average	28.50	6.00
5 wickets in innings	0	0
10 wickets in match	0	0
Best bowling	1/18	2/7
Catches/stumpings	1/–	1/–
- Source: Cricinfo, 7 April 2022

Suraiya Azmin (Bengali: সুরাইয়া আজমিন; born 29 May 1999) is a Bangladeshi cricketer who plays as a right-arm medium bowler. She made her Women's One Day International (WODI) debut against South Africa in the 2017 Women's Cricket World Cup Qualifier on 10 February 2017. In January 2022, she was named in Bangladesh's team for the 2022 Commonwealth Games Cricket Qualifier tournament in Malaysia. She made her Women's Twenty20 International (WT20I) debut on 18 January 2022, against Malaysia in the qualifier tournament. Later the same month, she was named in Bangladesh's team for the 2022 Women's Cricket World Cup in New Zealand.

She is married and gave birth to a baby in 2026.
