= Leine Loman =

Dutch cricketer

Madeleine Loman
Personal information
- Full name: Madeleine Leonore Loman
- Born: 27 January 1967 (age 59); Hilversum, Netherlands
- Batting: Right-handed
- Bowling: Slow left-arm orthodox
- Relatives: Dorine Loman (sister); Annemijn Thomson (first cousin once removed)

International information
- National side: Netherlands (1985–1989)
- ODI debut (cap 21): 19 July 1989 v England
- Last ODI: 21 July 1989 v Denmark

Career statistics
Competition	WODI
Matches	2
Runs scored	11
Batting average	11.00
100s/50s	0/0
Top score	11
Catches/stumpings	0/–
- Source: CricketArchive, 18 October 2015

Madeleine Leonore "Leine" Loman (born 27 January 1967) is a former Dutch international cricketer whose career for the Dutch national side spanned from 1985 to 1989. Her career included two One Day International (ODI) matches.

Born in Hilversum, North Holland, Loman appeared for a Young Netherlands team at the 1983 Centenary Tournament in Utrecht, which also featured the senior teams of Denmark, Ireland, and the Netherlands. Her own senior debut came in August 1985, aged 18, during a tour of England. The following year, Loman played for the Netherlands in the 1986 Women's Quadrangular in Ireland, which featured Denmark, Ireland, and England A. Her two ODI matches came at the 1989 European Championship in Denmark, where she played against England and Denmark. Despite being in the team primarily for her left-arm spin, Loman was not afforded the opportunity to bowl in either match. Against England, she was listed tenth in the batting order, but was not required. However, against Denmark, she was surprisingly promoted to opening batsman (alongside Edmee Janss), and went on to make 11 runs. Loman did not play again for the Netherlands after that match. Her older sister, Dorine Loman, also represented the Netherlands, but the sisters never played together at ODI level.
