= Katie McGill =

Scottish cricketer (born 1992)

Personal information
- Full name: Kathleen McGill
- Born: 13 January 1992 (age 34); Brighton, England
- Batting: Right-handed
- Bowling: Right-arm medium

International information
- National side: Scotland
- T20I debut (cap 9): 7 July 2018 v Uganda
- Last T20I: 25 September 2022 v Papua New Guinea
- Source: Cricinfo, 30 September 2022

Katie McGill (born 13 January 1992) is a Scottish cricketer. She played for the Scotland women's national cricket team in the 2017 Women's Cricket World Cup Qualifier in February 2017.

In June 2018, she was named in Scotland's squad for the 2018 ICC Women's World Twenty20 Qualifier tournament. She made her Women's Twenty20 International (WT20I) debut for Scotland against Uganda in the World Twenty20 Qualifier on 7 July 2018.

In May 2019, she was named in Scotland's squad for the 2019 ICC Women's Qualifier Europe tournament in Spain. In August 2019, she was named in Scotland's squad for the 2019 ICC Women's World Twenty20 Qualifier tournament in Scotland. In October 2019, she was named in the Women's Global Development Squad, ahead of a five-match series in Australia.

In January 2022, she was named in Scotland's team for the 2022 Commonwealth Games Cricket Qualifier tournament in Malaysia.
