= Frederique van Arkel =

Dutch cricketer (born 2000)

Personal information
- Full name: Frederique van Arkel
- Born: 7 January 2000 (age 26)
- Batting: Left-handed

International information
- National side: Netherlands
- T20I debut (cap 42): 8 August 2019 v Ireland
- Last T20I: 10 August 2019 v Thailand
- Source: Cricinfo, 10 August 2019

Frederique van Arkel (born 7 January 2000) is a Dutch cricketer. In August 2019, she was named in the Dutch Women's Twenty20 International (WT20I) squad for the 2019 Netherlands Women's Quadrangular Series. She made her WT20I debut for the Netherlands, against Ireland, on 8 August 2019.
