= Annemijn van Beuge =

Dutch cricketer (born 2001)

Personal information
- Born: 25 September 2001 (age 25)
- Batting: Right-handed
- Bowling: Right-arm medium

International information
- National side: Netherlands
- ODI debut (cap 90): 22 August 2022 v Ireland
- Last ODI: 12 August 2024 v Scotland
- T20I debut (cap 38): 27 June 2019 v Germany
- Last T20I: 16 August 2024 v Scotland
- Source: Cricinfo, 6 October 2024

Annemijn van Beuge (born 25 September 2001) is a Dutch cricketer. She made her WT20I debut for the Netherlands, against Germany, on 27 June 2019 in the 2019 ICC Women's Qualifier Europe tournament.

In August 2019, she was named in the Dutch squad for the 2019 Netherlands Women's Quadrangular Series. She played in the opening match of the series, against Ireland. Her One Day International debut came in 2022 against Ireland.
