= Rachel Slater =

Scottish cricketer (born 2001)

Personal information
- Full name: Rachel Elizabeth Slater
- Born: 20 November 2001 (age 24); Glens Falls, New York, U.S.
- Batting: Right-handed
- Bowling: Left-arm medium
- Role: Bowler

International information
- National side: Scotland (2022–present)
- ODI debut (cap 33): 14 April 2024 v United States
- Last ODI: 11 April 2025 v Pakistan
- T20I debut (cap 20): 18 January 2022 v Sri Lanka
- Last T20I: 3 October 2024 v Bangladesh
- T20I shirt no.: 72

Domestic team information
- Years: Team
- 2019–present: Yorkshire
- 2020–2024: Northern Diamonds
- 2021–2022: Northern Superchargers
- 2024–present: Oval Invincibles

Career statistics
Competition	WODI	WT20I	WLA	WT20
Matches	5	42	19	66
Runs scored	90	117	54	88
Batting average	90.00	6.88	18.00	4.40
100s/50s	0/1	0/0	0/0	0/0
Top score	61	21*	18*	15*
Balls bowled	184	743	626	1,002
Wickets	7	40	13	45
Bowling average	19.43	20.38	35.53	25.55
5 wickets in innings	0	1	0	1
10 wickets in match	0	0	0	0
Best bowling	3/9	5/17	2/24	5/17
Catches/stumpings	0/–	0/–	1/–	5/–
- Source: CricketArchive, 17 October 2024

Rachel Elizabeth Slater (born 20 November 2001) is a Scottish cricketer who currently plays for Yorkshire. She plays primarily as a left-arm medium bowler. She made her international debut for the Scotland women's cricket team in January 2022. She has previously played for Northern Diamonds and Northern Superchargers and Oval Invincibles.

== Early life ==
Slater was born on 20 November 2001 in Glens Falls, New York. She is a triplet, and her mother is from Giffnock in Scotland. Her parents moved from Leeds to New York due to her father's job before she was born, with the family moving back to Leeds when she was young.

== Domestic career ==
Slater made her county debut in 2019, for Yorkshire against Lancashire. She went on to take 2 wickets at an average of 22.00 in the County Championship that season. She only appeared in one match for the side in 2021, which was curtailed by rain. She took four wickets for Yorkshire in the 2022 Women's Twenty20 Cup, at an average of 23.00.

In 2020, Slater was named in the Northern Diamonds squad for the Rachael Heyhoe Flint Trophy, but did not play a match. In 2021, she was added to the Northern Superchargers squad for The Hundred as an injury replacement player, and appeared in one match, against Southern Brave. She was also retained in the Northern Diamonds squad for the 2021 season, and made her debut for the side on 28 August 2021, in a Charlotte Edwards Cup match against Western Storm, taking 2/16. She went on to take five wickets overall in the Charlotte Edwards Cup at an average of 14.00, as well as two wickets in the Rachael Heyhoe Flint Trophy. At the end of the 2021 season, it was announced that Slater had signed a professional contract with Northern Diamonds. She played eight matches for Northern Diamonds in 2022, across the Charlotte Edwards Cup and the Rachael Heyhoe Flint Trophy, taking three wickets. She also played two matches for Northern Superchargers in The Hundred. She played one match for Northern Diamonds in 2023. In 2024, she played 17 matches for Northern Diamonds, across the Rachael Heyhoe Flint Trophy and the Charlotte Edwards Cup, taking 18 wickets.

== International career ==
In January 2022, Slater was named in Scotland's squad for the 2022 Commonwealth Games Qualifier in Malaysia. She made her Women's Twenty20 International (WT20I) debut on 18 January 2022, for Scotland against Sri Lanka in the qualifier tournament. She played all four matches for Scotland in the tournament, but did not take a wicket. In September 2022, she played for Scotland during their series against Ireland and at the 2022 ICC Women's T20 World Cup Qualifier. In July 2023, she played for Scotland in a tri-series in the Netherlands, taking one wicket in her four matches.

In September 2024 she was named in the Scotland squad for the 2024 ICC Women's T20 World Cup.

Slater was part of the Scotland squad for the 2025 Women's Cricket World Cup Qualifier in Pakistan in April 2025.
