= Gwen Bloemen =

Dutch cricketer

Personal information
- Full name: Gwendoly Delphine Maria Octavia Bloemen
- Born: 24 July 2003 (age 23); Amsterdam, Netherlands
- Batting: Right-handed
- Bowling: Right-arm medium

International information
- National side: Netherlands
- ODI debut (cap 83): 22 August 2022 v Ireland
- Last ODI: 26 November 2022 v Thailand
- Only T20I (cap 44): 10 August 2019 v Thailand
- Source: Cricinfo, 22 August 2022

Gwen Bloemen is a Dutch cricketer. In August 2019, she was named in the Dutch Women's Twenty20 International (WT20I) squad for the 2019 Netherlands Women's Quadrangular Series. She made her WT20I debut for the Netherlands, against Thailand, on 10 August 2019.

In October 2021, she was named in the Dutch team for the 2021 Women's Cricket World Cup Qualifier tournament in Zimbabwe.
