= Chloe Abel =

Australia-born Scottish cricketer

Personal information
- Full name: Chloe Grace Abel
- Born: 3 December 2003 (age 22); Hobart, Tasmania, Australia
- Batting: Right-handed
- Bowling: Right-arm medium

International information
- National side: Scotland
- ODI debut (cap 34): 14 April 2024 v United States
- Last ODI: 12 August 2024 v Netherlands
- T20I debut (cap 25): 6 September 2023 v Italy
- Last T20I: 7 May 2024 v Sri Lanka
- T20I shirt no.: 22

Domestic team information
- Years: Team
- 2023–present: Middlesex

Career statistics
Competition	WODI	WT20I
Matches	5	10
Runs scored	9	58
Batting average	4.50	29.00
100s/50s	0/0	0/0
Top score	9	25
Balls bowled	144	139
Wickets	5	8
Bowling average	18.80	15.75
5 wickets in innings	0	0
10 wickets in match	0	0
Best bowling	2/20	3/14
Catches/stumpings	1/–	1/–
- Source: CricketArchive, 9 May 2024

Chloe Grace Abel (born 3 December 2003) is an Australian cricketer, who plays for Scotland as a right-arm medium bowler. She also plays for Middlesex.

== Personal life ==
She born in Hobart, Tasmania in Australia. She studied bachelor's degree in nursing at the University of Tasmania. She played for home town club New Town in Hobart, where she was the first grade captain. Her mother was a club golfer.

== Domestic career ==
In 2020, she was selected as replacement player for the Hobart Hurricanes in the 2019–20 Women's Big Bash League season.

In 2023, she played for Middlesex in the Women's Twenty20 Cup and in the London Cup. She also played a friendly match for Sunrisers against Essex on 15 August 2023.

== International career ==
In June 2023, she was earned maiden call-up for national team in T20I squad for the Netherlands Women's Tri-Nation Series. In August 2023, she was named in 2023 ICC Women's T20 World Cup Europe Qualifier. She made her Twenty20 International (T20I) debut for Scotland against Italy, on 6 September 2023.

In March 2024, she was named in ODI squad for the 2024 United Arab Emirates women's Tri-Nation Series. She made her One Day International (ODI) debut against United States, on 14 April 2024. In the same month she was selected for the 2024 ICC Women's T20 World Cup Qualifier. She made her Women's T20 World Cup Global Qualifier debut against Uganda on 25 April 2024.

In September 2024 she was named in the Scotland squad for the 2024 ICC Women's T20 World Cup.

Abel was part of the Scotland squad for the 2025 Women's Cricket World Cup Qualifier in Pakistan in April 2025.
