= Nurilyaa Natasya =

Malaysian cricketer (born 2002)

Personal information
- Full name: Nurilyaa Natasya Mohamad Asri
- Born: 1 January 2002 (age 24)
- Batting: Right-handed
- Role: Wicket-keeper

International information
- National side: Malaysia
- T20I debut (cap 30): 18 January 2022 v Bangladesh
- Last T20I: 8 October 2022 v Sri Lanka

Career statistics
Competition	WT20I
Matches	4
Runs scored	8
Batting average	4.00
100s/50s	0/0
Top score	8*
Catches/stumpings	1/–
- Source: Cricinfo, 29 January 2023

Nurilyaa Natasya Mohamad Asri (born 1 January 2002) is a Malaysian cricketer. She made her T20I debut on 18 January 2022, against Bangladesh. In October 2022, she played a few T20Is against Test-playing teams in the Women's Asia Cup.
