= Dolly Rani =

Bangladeshi cricketer and umpire (born 1989)

Personal information
- Full name: Dolly Rani Sarkar
- Born: 5 July 1989 (age 37); Naogaon, Bangladesh
- Nickname: Dolly
- Height: 4 ft 11 in (1.50 m)
- Batting: Right-handed
- Bowling: Right-arm off break
- Role: Bowling all-rounder; Umpire

Domestic team information
- Years: Team
- 2012/13: Rangpur Division

Umpiring information
- WT20Is umpired: 8 (2024–2025)

Career statistics
| Competition | LA |
|---|---|
| Matches | 6 |
| Runs scored | 17 |
| Batting average | – |
| 100s/50s | 0/0 |
| Top score | 8* |
| Balls bowled | 282 |
| Wickets | 15 |
| Bowling average | 8.06 |
| 5 wickets in innings | 2 |
| 10 wickets in match | 0 |
| Best bowling | 5/9 |
| Catches/stumpings | 3/– |
- Source: ESPNcricinfo, 21 November 2025

Dolly Rani Sarkar (Bengali: ডলি রানী সরকার) (born 5 July 1989) is a Bangladeshi cricket umpire and former cricketer. She is also one of the first Bangladeshi women umpires to join the ICC International Panel.

== Career ==
Rani played six List A matches for Rangpur Division in domestic cricket. In March 2024, Rani was selected for the ICC Development Panel of Umpires, along with Shathira Jakir, Mishu Chowdhury and Champa Chakma. On 7 December 2024, she officiated her first international as an on-field umpire in a women's T20I match between Bangladesh and Ireland, alongside Sue Redfern.
