= Lisa Klokgieters =

Dutch cricketer (born 1998)

Personal information
- Full name: Liesbeth Klokgieters
- Born: 28 March 1998 (age 28)
- Batting: Right-handed
- Bowling: Right-arm medium

International information
- National side: Netherlands
- T20I debut (cap 28): 7 July 2018 v UAE
- Last T20I: 14 August 2019 v Thailand
- Source: ESPNcricinfo, 14 August 2019

Lisa Klokgieters (born 28 March 1998) is a Dutch cricketer. She played for the Netherlands women's national cricket team in the 2015 ICC Women's World Twenty20 Qualifier in November 2015.

In June 2018, she was named in the Netherlands' squad for the 2018 ICC Women's World Twenty20 Qualifier tournament. She made her Women's Twenty20 International (WT20I) debut for the Netherlands against the United Arab Emirates in the World Twenty20 Qualifier on 7 July 2018.
