= Jolien van Vliet =

Dutch cricketer (born 1998)

Personal information
- Full name: Jolien van Vliet
- Born: 24 July 1998 (age 28)
- Batting: Right-handed

International information
- National side: Netherlands
- ODI debut (cap 92): 22 August 2022 v Ireland
- Last ODI: 22 November 2022 v Thailand
- T20I debut (cap 32): 7 July 2018 v UAE
- Last T20I: 15 July 2023 v Scotland
- Source: Cricinfo, 6 October 2024

Jolien van Vliet (born 24 July 1998) is a Dutch cricketer. In July 2018, she was named in the Netherlands' squad for the 2018 ICC Women's World Twenty20 Qualifier tournament. She made her Women's Twenty20 International (WT20I) debut for the Netherlands against United Arab Emirates in the World Twenty20 Qualifier on 7 July 2018.

In May 2019, she was named in Netherlands' squad for the 2019 ICC Women's Qualifier Europe tournament in Spain. In October 2021, she was named in the Dutch team for the 2021 Women's Cricket World Cup Qualifier tournament in Zimbabwe.
