= Darcey Carter =

English-born Scottish cricketer

Personal information
- Full name: Darcey Elizabeth Morris Carter
- Born: 31 May 2005 (age 21); Bexley, Greater London, England
- Batting: Right-handed
- Bowling: Right-arm off break
- Role: Bowler

International information
- National side: Scotland
- ODI debut (cap 21): 17 October 2023 v Ireland
- Last ODI: 9 April 2025 v West Indies
- T20I debut (cap 23): 10 July 2023 v Thailand
- Last T20I: 1 February 2026 v USA
- T20I shirt no.: 11

Domestic team information
- Years: Team
- 2022–2024: Kent
- 2023: South East Stars
- 2024: → North West Thunder (on loan)
- 2025–: Lancashire

Career statistics
Competition	WODI	WT20I	WLA	WT20
Matches	10	38	20	59
Runs scored	225	791	272	856
Batting average	22.50	26.36	15.11	25.17
100s/50s	0/1	0/7	0/1	0/7
Top score	86	76*	86	76*
Balls bowled	394	312	736	647
Wickets	8	19	15	35
Bowling average	34.37	16.36	39.06	17.54
5 wickets in innings	0	0	0	0
10 wickets in match	0	0	0	0
Best bowling	3/20	3/11	3/20	3/11
Catches/stumpings	5/–	21/–	8/–	27/–
- Source: CricketArchive, 5 May 2026

Darcey Elizabeth Morris Carter (born 31 May 2005) is a Scottish cricketer who currently plays for Lancashire. She plays as a right-arm off break bowler.

She made her international debut for Scotland in July 2023, in a Twenty20 International against Thailand. Ranked third among all-time run scorers in Scotland Women’s cricket, behind Kathryn Bryce and Sarah Bryce.

== Early life ==
Carter was born on 31 May 2005 in Bexley, Greater London.

== Domestic career ==
Carter made her county debut in 2022, for Kent against Hampshire, in which she took 2/12 from her 2 overs. Overall, she took six wickets at an average of 16.50 in the 2022 Women's Twenty20 Cup. She played two matches in the 2023 Women's Twenty20 Cup, taking two wickets at an average of 8.50.

Carter was named in the South East Stars Academy squad between 2021 and 2023. She was promoted to the senior squad in June 2023. She made her debut for the side on 2 July 2023, against Northern Diamonds in the Rachael Heyhoe Flint Trophy, taking 2/31 from 5 overs.

Carter was named in the South East Stars Academy squad for 2024. In August 2024, it was announced that Carter had gone on loan from South East Stars to North West Thunder for the remainder of the season.

== International career ==
In August 2022, Carter played for Scotland Under-19s in the Europe Qualifier for the 2023 ICC Under-19 Women's T20 World Cup against the Netherlands. In the third match of the series, she scored 103* from 55 balls.

In December 2022, Carter was selected in the Scotland Under-19 squad for the 2023 ICC Under-19 Women's T20 World Cup. She played all four matches for the side at the tournament, scoring 54 runs at an average of 13.50.

In July 2023, she received her first call-up to the senior side, for a Tri-Nation Series in the Netherlands. She made her Twenty20 International debut in the first match of the series, against Thailand on 10 July 2023. She made her One Day International debut on 17 October 2023, against Ireland.

In September 2024 she was named in the Scotland squad for the 2024 ICC Women's T20 World Cup.

Carter was part of the Scotland squad for the 2025 Women's Cricket World Cup Qualifier in Pakistan in April 2025. She scored 25 off 48 balls and took a wicket in her team's win against the West Indies in their opening match, but also suffered an injury which ruled her out of the rest of the tournament.
