= Lorna Jack-Brown =

Scottish cricketer (born 1992)

Personal information
- Full name: Lorna Jack-Brown
- Born: 24 November 1992 (age 33); Paisley, Renfrewshire, Scotland
- Batting: Right-handed
- Role: Wicket-keeper

International information
- National side: Scotland (2018–2024)
- ODI debut (cap 23): 17 October 2023 v Ireland
- Last ODI: 12 August 2024 v Netherlands
- T20I debut (cap 7): 7 July 2018 v Uganda
- Last T20I: 13 October 2024 v England
- T20I shirt no.: 10
- Source: Cricinfo, 16 October 2024

Lorna Jack-Brown (born 24 November 1992) is a Scottish former cricketer. She played for the Scotland women's national cricket team in the 2017 Women's Cricket World Cup Qualifier in February 2017.

== Early life ==
She studied for her bachelor's degree in sports coaching at the University of the West of Scotland. She spent time in the US and later joined the police. She has a wife (Christina Brown) and a daughter (Isla McPherson) who is taken care of by her partner during her overseas commitments.

== International career ==
In June 2018, she was named in Scotland's squad for the 2018 ICC Women's World Twenty20 Qualifier tournament. She made her Women's Twenty20 International (WT20I) debut for Scotland against Uganda in the World Twenty20 Qualifier on 7 July 2018. In 2018, she retired from her position as wicketkeeper as act as a batter and fielder for Scotland's women's team. In May 2019, she was named in Scotland's squad for the 2019 ICC Women's Qualifier Europe tournament in Spain. In August 2019, she was named in Scotland's squad for the 2019 ICC Women's World Twenty20 Qualifier tournament in Scotland. In January 2022, she was named in Scotland's team for the 2022 Commonwealth Games Cricket Qualifier tournament in Malaysia. In September 2024 she was named in the Scotland squad for the 2024 ICC Women's T20 World Cup.

In October 2024, she announced her retirement from international cricket.
