= Mikkie Zwilling =

Dutch cricketer (born 1999)

Personal information
- Full name: Mikkie Martine Heleen Zwilling
- Born: 31 October 1999 (age 27); The Hague, Netherlands
- Batting: Left-handed
- Bowling: Left-arm medium
- Relatives: Iris Zwilling (sister)

International information
- National side: Netherlands (2019–present)
- T20I debut (cap 43): 9 August 2019 v Scotland
- Last T20I: 12 September 2023 v Italy
- Source: Cricinfo, 5 October 2024

Mikkie Zwilling (born 31 October 1999) is a cricketer who plays for the Netherlands. In August 2019, she was named in the Dutch Women's Twenty20 International (WT20I) squad for the 2019 Netherlands Women's Quadrangular Series. She made her WT20I debut against Scotland, on 9 August 2019.
