= Katherine Fraser (cricketer) =

Scottish cricketer (born 2005)

Personal information
- Full name: Katherine Fraser
- Born: 9 April 2005 (age 21); Edinburgh, Midlothian, Scotland
- Batting: Right-handed
- Bowling: Right-arm offbreak
- Role: All-rounder

International information
- National side: Scotland
- ODI debut (cap 31): 12 April 2024 v Papua New Guinea
- Last ODI: 12 August 2024 v Netherlands
- T20I debut (cap 15): 29 June 2019 v Germany
- Last T20I: 25 November 2025 v Namibia
- T20I shirt no.: 70

Domestic team information
- Years: Team
- 2023–present: Northern Diamonds

Career statistics
Competition	WODI	WT20I
Matches	6	41
Runs scored	152	92
Batting average	38.00	6.57
100s/50s	0/1	0/0
Top score	74*	14*
Balls bowled	237	706
Wickets	7	42
Bowling average	20.71	14.41
5 wickets in innings	0	0
10 wickets in match	9	0
Best bowling	2/20	4/19
Catches/stumpings	3/–	8/–
- Source: Cricinfo, 16 October 2024

Katherine Fraser (born 9 April 2005) is a Scottish cricketer. In May 2019, she was named in Scotland's squad for the 2019 ICC Women's Qualifier Europe tournament in Spain. She made her Women's Twenty20 International (WT20I) debut for Scotland against Germany on 29 June 2019. At the age of 14 years and 81 days, she was the youngest female cricketer to represent Scotland in a WT20I match. At the time of her international debut, Fraser was a third-year pupil at The Mary Erskine School in Edinburgh.

In August 2019, she was named in Scotland's squad for the 2019 Netherlands Women's Quadrangular Series. She played in Scotland's first match of the series, against Thailand on 8 August 2019. She finished the tournament as the joint-leading wicket-taker, with nine dismissals from six matches. Later the same month, she was named in Scotland's squad for the 2019 ICC Women's World Twenty20 Qualifier tournament in Scotland. On her selection for the tournament, Fraser said it was "really really exciting" and "a great opportunity".

In January 2022, she was named in Scotland's team for the 2022 Commonwealth Games Cricket Qualifier tournament in Malaysia. In April 2022, it was announced that she would be training with Northern Diamonds for the upcoming season. Fraser is captaining the Scotland under-19 team at the 2023 ICC Under-19 Women's T20 World Cup in South Africa during January 2023.

In September 2024 she was named in the Scotland squad for the 2024 ICC Women's T20 World Cup.

Fraser was chosen to captain a Scotland XI at the T10 European Cricket Championship in Spain in December 2024.

She was part of the Scotland squad for the 2025 Women's Cricket World Cup Qualifier in Pakistan in April 2025.
