= Annemijn Thomson =

Dutch cricketer (born 1996)

Personal information
- Born: 26 January 1996 (age 30)
- Batting: Right-handed
- Bowling: Right-arm leg break
- Relatives: Dorine Loman (first cousin once removed); Madeleine Loman (first cousin once removed)

International information
- National side: Netherlands
- ODI debut (cap 99): 24 November 2022 v Thailand
- Last ODI: 5 August 2024 v Papua New Guinea
- T20I debut (cap 41): 8 August 2019 v Ireland
- Last T20I: 30 May 2024 v Italy
- Source: Cricinfo, 6 October 2024

Annemijn Thomson (born 26 January 1996) is a Dutch cricketer. She has played for the Netherlands women's national cricket team in the 2015 ICC Women's World Twenty20 Qualifier in December 2015.

In June 2018, she was named in the Netherlands squad for the 2018 ICC Women's World Twenty20 Qualifier tournament. In August 2019, her name was included in the Dutch Women's Twenty20 International (WT20I) squad for the 2019 Netherlands Women's Quadrangular Series. She made her WT20I debut against Ireland, on 8 August 2019.
