= Eva Lynch =

Dutch cricketer (born 2000)

Personal information
- Full name: Eva Nynke Lynch
- Born: 16 January 2000 (age 26)
- Batting: Right-handed
- Bowling: Right-arm off-break

International information
- National side: Netherlands
- ODI debut (cap 85): 22 August 2022 v Ireland
- Last ODI: 12 August 2024 v Scotland
- T20I debut (cap 39): 29 June 2019 v Germany
- Last T20I: 31 January 2025 v Thailand
- Source: ESPNCricinfo, 31 May 2025

Eva Lynch (born 16 January 2000) is a Dutch cricketer. She made her Women's Twenty20 International (WT20I) debut for the Netherlands, against Germany, on 29 June 2019 in the 2019 ICC Women's Qualifier Europe tournament.

In August 2019, she was named in the Dutch squad for the 2019 Netherlands Women's Quadrangular Series. She played in the opening match of the series, against Ireland. Later the same month, she was named in the Dutch squad for the 2019 ICC Women's World Twenty20 Qualifier tournament in Scotland. In October 2021, she was named in the Dutch team for the 2021 Women's Cricket World Cup Qualifier tournament in Zimbabwe.
