= Ellen Watson (cricketer) =

Scottish cricketer (born 2000)

Personal information
- Full name: Ellen Lily Watson
- Born: 10 March 2000 (age 26); Irvine, North Ayrshire Scotland
- Batting: Right-handed
- Role: Wicket-keeper

International information
- National side: Scotland
- ODI debut (cap 28): 17 October 2023 v Ireland
- Last ODI: 19 October 2023 v Ireland
- T20I debut (cap 17): 9 August 2019 v Netherlands
- Last T20I: 19 September 2022 v Bangladesh

Domestic team information
- Years: Team
- 2019: Berkshire
- 2025: Leicestershire

Career statistics
Competition	WT20I	WLA	WT20
Matches	10	13	24
Runs scored	72	71	124
Batting average	18.00	7.88	10.33
100s/50s	0/0	0/0	0/0
Top score	30*	35	30*
Catches/stumpings	3/–	1/1	6/0
- Source: CricketArchive, 30 September 2022

Ellen Lily Watson (born 10 March 2000) is a Scottish cricketer who plays as a right-handed batter and wicket-keeper. In July 2018, she was named in Scotland's squad for the 2018 ICC Women's World Twenty20 Qualifier tournament.

In August 2019, she was named in Scotland's squad for the 2019 Netherlands Women's Quadrangular Series. She made her WT20I debut for Scotland, against the Netherlands, on 9 August 2019. Later the same month, she was named in Scotland's squad for the 2019 ICC Women's World Twenty20 Qualifier tournament in Scotland. In January 2022, she was named in Scotland's squad for the 2022 Commonwealth Games Cricket Qualifier in Malaysia.

She played four matches in the 2019 Women's County Championship for Berkshire, scoring 13 runs in three innings.
