= Juliët Post =

Dutch cricketer

Personal information
- Born: 26 December 1997 (age 28)
- Batting: Right-handed
- Bowling: Right-arm medium

International information
- National side: Netherlands
- ODI debut (cap 87): 22 August 2022 v Ireland
- Last ODI: 24 August 2022 v Ireland
- T20I debut (cap 34): 14 July 2018 v UAE
- Last T20I: 30 June 2022 v Namibia
- Source: Cricinfo, 24 August 2022

Juliët Post (born 26 December 1997) is a Dutch former cricketer and a former captain of the Netherlands women's national cricket team.

== Career ==
She played for the Netherlands women's cricket team in the 2015 ICC Women's World Twenty20 Qualifier in November 2015.

In June 2018, she was named in the Netherlands' squad for the 2018 ICC Women's World Twenty20 Qualifier tournament. She made her Women's Twenty20 International (WT20I) debut for the Netherlands in that tournament, against the United Arab Emirates on 14 July 2018.

In May 2019, she was named as the captain of the Netherlands' squad for the 2019 ICC Women's Qualifier Europe tournament in Spain. In August 2019, she was named as the captain of the Dutch squad for the 2019 ICC Women's World Twenty20 Qualifier tournament in Scotland. In October 2021, she was named in the Dutch team for the 2021 Women's Cricket World Cup Qualifier tournament in Zimbabwe.
