= Abtaha Maqsood =

Scottish cricketer

Personal information
- Full name: Abtaha Mahin Maqsood
- Born: 11 June 1999 (age 27); Glasgow, Scotland
- Batting: Right-handed
- Bowling: Right-arm leg break
- Role: Bowler

International information
- National side: Scotland
- ODI debut (cap 25): 17 October 2023 v Ireland
- Last ODI: 18 April 2025 v Ireland
- T20I debut (cap 8): 7 July 2018 v Uganda
- Last T20I: 13 October 2024 v England
- T20I shirt no.: 9

Domestic team information
- Years: Team
- 2021–2023: Birmingham Phoenix
- 2022-2024: Sunrisers
- 2023: Middlesex
- 2025: Essex

Career statistics
Competition	WODI	WT20I	WLA	WT20
Matches	13	57	51	127
Runs scored	20	38	87	78
Batting average	3.33	4.75	3.78	3.90
100s/50s	0/0	0/0	0/0	0/0
Top score	6*	9	14	9
Balls bowled	584	1040	1876	2116
Wickets	24	54	64	103
Bowling average	18.70	17.64	21.14	20.53
5 wickets in innings	0	0	1	0
10 wickets in match	0	0	0	0
Best bowling	4/30	3/8	5/30	3/8
Catches/stumpings	4/–	15/–	11/–	27/–
- Source: CricketArchive, 6 June 2025

Abtaha "Abbie" Maqsood (born 11 June 1999) is a Scottish cricketer who currently plays for Essex and Scotland as a right-arm leg break bowler. She has also previously played for Middlesex, Sunrisers and Birmingham Phoenix.

== Early and personal life ==
The daughter of immigrants from Pakistan, Maqsood was educated at Eastwood High School, Newton Mearns, and played club cricket for Poloc, having joined them at the age of 11. She plays cricket wearing a hijab. She has a black belt in taekwondo and was a flag bearer at the 2014 Commonwealth Games in Glasgow.

== Career ==
After only four months at Poloc, Maqsood was called up to the Scotland under-17 squad and debuted for them aged 12. Maqsood played for the Scotland women's national cricket team in the 2017 Women's Cricket World Cup Qualifier in February 2017.

In June 2018, she was named in Scotland's squad for the 2018 ICC Women's World Twenty20 Qualifier tournament. She made her Women's Twenty20 International (WT20I) debut for Scotland against Uganda in the World Twenty20 Qualifier on 7 July 2018.

In May 2019, she was named in Scotland's squad for the 2019 ICC Women's Qualifier Europe tournament in Spain. In August 2019, she was named in Scotland's squad for the 2019 ICC Women's World Twenty20 Qualifier tournament in Scotland. Ahead of the inaugural season of The Hundred, Maqsood was signed by the Birmingham Phoenix, and played for the side again in 2022. In January 2022, she was named in Scotland's team for the 2022 Commonwealth Games Cricket Qualifier tournament in Malaysia. In March 2022, it was announced that Maqsood has signed for Sunrisers for the first part of the 2022 season. Ahead of the 2023 season, it was announced that Maqsood was returning to Sunrisers, this time signing a professional contract with the side. On 22 April 2023, she took her maiden five-wicket haul in Women's List A cricket, helping her team to defeat Southern Vipers by 126 runs. She also appeared for Middlesex in the 2023 Women's Twenty20 Cup.

In September 2024 she was named in the Scotland squad for the 2024 ICC Women's T20 World Cup.

In October 2024, she signed for Essex Women ahead of the 2025 women's domestic cricket restructure.

Maqsood was part of the Scotland squad for the 2025 Women's Cricket World Cup Qualifier in Pakistan in April 2025.
