= Iris Zwilling =

Dutch cricketer (born 2001)

Personal information
- Full name: Iris Jeane Regine Zwilling
- Born: 8 September 2001 (age 25)
- Batting: Right-handed
- Bowling: Right-arm medium
- Role: All-rounder
- Relatives: Mikkie Zwilling (sister)

International information
- National side: Netherlands (2019–present)
- ODI debut (cap 93): 22 August 2022 v Ireland
- Last ODI: 12 August 2024 v Scotland
- T20I debut (cap 37): 26 June 2019 v Scotland
- Last T20I: 14 June 2026 v Bangladesh

Domestic team information
- Years: Team
- 2018–2023: Voorburg Cricket Club
- 2024–present: Haagsche Cricket Club

Career statistics
Competition	WODI	WT20I
Matches	13	94
Runs scored	145	884
Batting average	11.15	14.98
100s/50s	0/0	0/2
Top score	32	56
Balls bowled	703	1914
Wickets	27	101
Bowling average	14.92	16.45
5 wickets in innings	1	0
10 wickets in match	0	0
Best bowling	5/25	3/6
Catches/stumpings	4/–	29/–
- Source: Cricinfo, 13 June 2026

Iris Jeane Regine Zwilling (born 8 September 2001) is a Dutch international cricketer who plays as an all-rounder for the Netherlands women's national cricket team. She is a right-handed batter and a right-arm medium-pace bowler. In domestic cricket, she plays for Haagsche Cricket Club (HCC) in the KNCB women's competitions.

== Personal life ==
Zwilling was born on 8 September 2001, in the Netherlands. She grew up alongside her older sister, Mikkie Zwilling, who is also a professional cricketer representing the Dutch national team.

== International career ==
=== 2019: Early debuts ===
Zwilling earned her first international cap for the senior team on June 26, 2019, playing against the Scotland during the 2019 ICC Women's Qualifier Europe tournament. Later that summer, she was selected for both the local Quadrangular series and the official 2019 ICC Women's T20 World Cup Qualifier.

=== 2021–2023: WODI Status & Progression ===
In October 2021, she traveled with the national squad to compete in the Women's Cricket World Cup Qualifier held in Zimbabwe. Following the ICC's decision to grant permanent ODI status to associate nations, Zwilling made her official Women's One Day International (WODI) debut on August 22, 2022, during a home series against the Ireland women's cricket team. During Ireland's return tour the following year, she struck a career-high Women's Twenty20 International (WT20I) score of 56 runs off 58 balls at the VRA Cricket Ground in Amstelveen.

== Records ==
=== T20I ===
- On 3 June 2026, she became the 1st Dutch player (male or female) to record 100 wickets in T20I.
