= Sterre Kalis =

Dutch cricketer

Personal information
- Full name: Sterre Laurien Kalis
- Born: 30 August 1999 (age 27); The Hague, Netherlands
- Batting: Right-handed
- Bowling: Right-arm medium
- Role: Batter

International information
- National side: Netherlands (2014–present)
- ODI debut (cap 96): 20 November 2022 v Thailand
- Last ODI: 3 July 2023 v Thailand
- T20I debut (cap 27): 7 July 2018 v UAE
- Last T20I: 8 September 2023 v Italy

Domestic team information
- Years: Team
- 2016–2018: Essex
- 2020–present: Northern Diamonds
- 2021: Northern Superchargers
- 2022–present: North East Warriors
- 2022–present: Birmingham Phoenix

Career statistics
| Competition | WODI | WT20I | WLA | WT20 |
|---|---|---|---|---|
| Matches | 5 | 62 | 64 | 88 |
| Runs scored | 106 | 1,893 | 1,673 | 1,968 |
| Batting average | 21.20 | 36.40 | 32.17 | 28.11 |
| 100s/50s | 0/1 | 1/11 | 0/10 | 1/8 |
| Top score | 54 | 126* | 87 | 126* |
| Balls bowled | – | 66 | 248 | 180 |
| Wickets | – | 4 | 2 | 8 |
| Bowling average | – | 13.75 | 90.50 | 21.00 |
| 5 wickets in innings | – | 0 | 0 | 0 |
| 10 wickets in match | – | 0 | 0 | 0 |
| Best bowling | – | 2/11 | 1/20 | 2/11 |
| Catches/stumpings | 2/– | 9/– | 20/– | 35/– |
- Source: CricketArchive, 4 October 2023

Sterre Laurien Kalis (born 30 August 1999) is a Dutch cricketer who plays for the national cricket team as a right-handed batter. At domestic level, she plays for the English teams Northern Diamonds, Birmingham Phoenix and North East Warriors, and has previously played for Essex and Northern Superchargers. She has also taken the field for other domestic teams in the Netherlands and Australia.

== Career ==
Kalis played for the Netherlands in the 2015 ICC Women's World Twenty20 Qualifier in November 2015.

In June 2018, Kalis was named in the Netherlands squad for the 2018 ICC Women's World Twenty20 Qualifier tournament. She made her Women's Twenty20 International (WT20I) debut against the United Arab Emirates in the World Twenty20 Qualifier on 7 July 2018. She was the leading run-scorer for the tournament, with 231 runs in five matches. Following the conclusion of the tournament, she was named as the rising star of the Netherlands' squad by the International Cricket Council (ICC).

In July 2018, she was named in the ICC Women's Global Development Squad. In November 2018, she was again named in the Women's Global Development Squad, to play fixtures against Women's Big Bash League (WBBL) clubs.

In May 2019, she was named in Netherlands' squad for the 2019 ICC Women's Qualifier Europe tournament in Spain. On 27 June 2019, in the match against Germany, Kalis scored her first century in WT20Is, and equalled the record for the highest score in a WT20I, with 126 not out. She was the leading run-scorer in the tournament, with 158 runs in four matches.

In August 2019, she was named in the Dutch squad for the 2019 ICC Women's World Twenty20 Qualifier tournament in Scotland. She was the leading run-scorer for the Netherlands in the tournament, with 117 runs in five matches.

In November 2020, Kalis was nominated for the ICC Women's Associate Cricketer of the Decade award. In October 2021, she was named in the Dutch team for the 2021 Women's Cricket World Cup Qualifier tournament in Zimbabwe.

In April 2022, she was bought by the Birmingham Phoenix for the 2022 season of The Hundred in England. Later that month, she was announced in the North East Warriors squad for the 2022 Women's Twenty20 Cup.

In May 2022, Kalis played seven matches for the tournament-winning Tornadoes team at the 2022 FairBreak Invitational T20 in Dubai, United Arab Emirates. During the Invitational, she scored a total of 225 runs, the fifth-highest of any player, including two fifties, and two other scores in excess of 40. She was also awarded player of the match for top scoring with 32 in her team's first match, against the Sapphires team.
