= Hannah Landheer =

Dutch cricketer (born 2002)

Personal information
- Full name: Hannah Wilhelmina Adriana Landheer
- Born: 20 October 2002 (age 24)
- Batting: Right-handed
- Bowling: Right-arm medium

International information
- National side: Netherlands
- ODI debut (cap 97): 20 November 2022 v Thailand
- Last ODI: 12 August 2024 v Scotland
- T20I debut (cap 36): 26 June 2019 v Scotland
- Last T20I: 16 August 2024 v Scotland
- Source: Cricinfo, 6 October 2024

Hannah Landheer (born 20 October 2002) is a Dutch cricketer. She made her Women's Twenty20 International (WT20I) debut for the Netherlands women's cricket team on 26 June 2019, against Scotland, in the 2019 ICC Women's Qualifier Europe tournament.

In August 2019, she was included in the Netherlands squad for the 2019 ICC Women's World Twenty20 Qualifier tournament in Scotland. In October 2021, she was named in the Dutch team for the 2021 Women's Cricket World Cup Qualifier tournament in Zimbabwe.
