= Caroline de Lange =

Dutch cricketer (born 1998)

Personal information
- Born: 27 July 1998 (age 28)
- Batting: Right-handed
- Bowling: Right-arm Legbreak Googly

International information
- National side: Netherlands
- ODI debut (cap 94): 24 August 2022 v Ireland
- Last ODI: 12 August 2024 v Scotland
- T20I debut (cap 35): 26 June 2019 v Scotland
- Last T20I: 16 August 2024 v Scotland
- Source: Cricinfo, 6 October 2024

Caroline de Lange (born 27 July 1998) is a Dutch cricketer. She made her Women's Twenty20 International (WT20I) debut for the Netherlands, against Scotland, on 26 June 2019 in the 2019 ICC Women's Qualifier Europe tournament.

In August 2019, she was named in the Dutch squad for the 2019 Netherlands Women's Quadrangular Series. She played in the opening match of the series, against Ireland. Later the same month, de Lange was named in the Dutch squad for the 2019 ICC Women's World Twenty20 Qualifier tournament in Scotland. In October 2021, she was named in the Dutch team for the 2021 Women's Cricket World Cup Qualifier tournament in Zimbabwe.
