= Silver Siegers =

Dutch cricketer (born 2000)

Personal information
- Full name: Silver Naara Louise Siegers
- Born: 14 February 2000 (age 26); Haarlem, Netherlands
- Batting: Right-handed
- Bowling: Right-arm leg break
- Relatives: Heather Siegers (sister)

International information
- National side: Netherlands
- ODI debut (cap 89): 22 August 2022 v Ireland
- Last ODI: 12 August 2024 v Scotland
- T20I debut (cap 33): 8 July 2018 v Bangladesh
- Last T20I: 16 August 2024 v Scotland
- Source: Cricinfo, 6 October 2024

Silver Naara Louise Siegers (born 14 February 2000) is a Dutch cricketer. In July 2018, she was named in the Netherlands' squad for the 2018 ICC Women's World Twenty20 Qualifier tournament. She made her Women's Twenty20 International (WT20I) debut for the Netherlands against Bangladesh in the World Twenty20 Qualifier on 8 July 2018.

In May 2019, she was named in Netherlands' squad for the 2019 ICC Women's Qualifier Europe tournament in Spain. In August 2019, she was named in the Dutch squad for the 2019 ICC Women's World Twenty20 Qualifier tournament in Scotland. In October 2021, she was named in the Dutch team for the 2021 Women's Cricket World Cup Qualifier tournament in Zimbabwe.

Having an elder sister Heather Siegers already playing cricket, Silver was inspired to do well and compete at the highest level with her sister, right since she was in school.
