= List of Netherlands women Twenty20 International cricketers =

Overall, 53 players have represented the Dutch national women's cricket team in Twenty20 International (T20I) cricket. The Netherlands made its Twenty20 International debut in July 2008, when the team played two T20Is against the West Indies in Utrecht. However, at the 2011 World Cup Qualifier, the Netherlands failed to make the top six teams, thus losing both its ODI and T20I status. Between 2008 and 2011, the Netherlands played in a total of eleven T20I fixtures, including three matches at the 2010 ICC Women's Challenge. In April 2018, the International Cricket Council (ICC) granted full international status to Twenty20 women's matches played between member sides from 1 July 2018 onwards. This list includes all players who have played at least one T20I match and is initially arranged in the order of debut appearance. Where more than one player won their first cap in the same match, those players are initially listed alphabetically at the time of debut.

== Key ==
General

- ‡ – Captain
- † – Wicket-keeper
- First – Year of debut
- Last – Year of latest game
- Mat – Number of matches played

Batting

- Runs – Runs scored in career
- HS – Highest score
- Avg – Runs scored per dismissal
- * – Batsman remained not out

Bowling

- Wkt – Wickets taken in career
- BBI – Best bowling in an innings
- Ave – Average runs per wicket

Fielding

- Ca – Catches taken
- St – Stumpings affected

== List of players ==
Statistics are correct as of 27 June 2026.

General					Batting					Bowling				Fielding		Ref
No.	Name	First	Last	Mat	Runs	HS	50	100	Avg	Balls	Wkt	BBI	Ave	Ca	St	Ref
1	Marloes Braat	2008	2022	10	18	10*	0	0	6.00	141	7	2/11	19.57	0	0	
2	Caroline de Fouw	2008	2018	6	14	8	0	0	4.66	106	6	3/31	19.66	0	0	
3	Carlijn de Groot	2008	2011	8	66	23	0	0	9.42	–	–	–	–	1	0	
4	Lotte Egging	2008	2008	2	0	0	0	0	0.00	42	3	2/24	17.33	1	0	
5	Denise van Deventer	2008	2019	25	307	40	0	0	19.18	42	1	1/17	45.00	5	0	
6	Jolet Hartenhof	2008	2011	4	–	–	–	–	–	76	1	1/24	85.00	0	0	
7	Helmien Rambaldo‡	2008	2011	10	154	34	0	0	19.25	84	1	1/9	92.00	4	0	
8	Carolien Salomons	2008	2011	5	59	27	0	0	11.80	–	–	–	–	2	0	
9	Annemarie Tanke	2008	2010	5	29	20	0	0	5.80	78	1	1/18	138.00	2	0	
10	Miranda Veringmeier	2008	2021	22	367	60	0	2	19.31	30	2	2/10	11.50	7	0	
11	Violet Wattenberg†	2008	2011	11	146	25	0	0	16.22	–	–	–	–	3	1	
12	Mandy Kornet‡	2008	2009	2	1	1	0	0	0.50	48	2	1/17	18.50	0	0	
13	Cheraldine Oudolf	2008	2009	2	18	9	0	0	9.00	–	–	–	–	0	0	
14	Jacqueline Pashley	2008	2008	1	3	3*	0	0	–	–	–	–	–	0	0	
15	Laura Brouwers	2009	2011	8	12	5*	0	0	12.00	124	1	1/19	137.00	1	0	
16	Evelien Gerrits	2009	2011	7	2	2*	0	0	–	128	3	3/13	54.33	0	0	
17	Alarda Mol	2009	2011	3	9	9	0	0	4.50	–	–	–	–	0	0	
18	Marijn Nijman	2009	2011	6	55	29*	0	0	13.75	–	–	–	–	0	0	
19	Esther Lanser	2010	2011	6	104	55	0	1	20.80	138	2	1/21	80.50	0	0	
20	Mariska Kornet	2010	2018	8	2	1*	0	0	1.00	156	2	1/31	106.00	1	0	
21	Denise Prins	2010	2010	2	14	11	0	0	14.00	–	–	–	–	0	0	
22	Esther de Lange	2010	2011	6	17	14*	0	0	4.25	102	4	1/5	28.25	0	0	
23	Leonie Bennett	2011	2019	10	27	16	0	0	5.40	132	6	3/22	21.66	1	0	
24	Maxime Entrop	2011	2011	2	5	5*	0	0	–	6	0	–	–	0	0	
25	Esther Corder	2018	2018	5	0	0	0	0	0.00	54	0	–	–	0	0	
26	Babette de Leede‡†	2018	2026	102	1,800	82*	0	9	22.50	–	–	–	–	55	37	
27	Sterre Kalis	2018	2026	69	2,053	126*	1	11	34.79	66	4	2/11	13.75	36	0	
28	Lisa Klokgieters	2018	2018	4	9	8	0	0	4.50	66	3	3/34	31.00	1	0	
29	Robine Rijke	2018	2026	102	1,497	84*	3	0	20.22	546	31	4/7	15.77	32	0	
30	Heather Siegers‡†	2018	2026	76	1,339	106*	3	1	19.98	817	41	3/27	20.29	26	1	
31	Cher van Slobbe	2018	2018	5	15	6*	0	0	7.50	99	5	2/4	16.80	2	0	
32	Jolien van Vliet	2018	2023	7	5	2*	0	0	5.00	–	–	–	–	3	0	
33	Silver Siegers	2018	2026	82	69	12*	0	0	4.92	1,551	61	2/7	26.13	10	0	
34	Juliët Post‡	2018	2022	27	101	20*	0	0	7.76	6	0	–	–	6	0	
35	Caroline de Lange	2019	2026	92	126	21*	0	0	6.00	1,880	89	4/6	18.91	17	0	
36	Hannah Landheer	2019	2026	61	77	14*	0	0	5.50	754	44	3/10	17.56	7	0	
37	Iris Zwilling	2019	2026	98	895	56	2	0	14.43	2,010	107	3/6	17.00	32	0	
38	Annemijn van Beuge	2019	2024	14	21	5*	0	0	7.00	210	9	2/4	22.44	3	0	
39	Eva Lynch	2019	2025	50	121	19*	0	0	6.05	942	45	4/24	17.75	19	0	
40	Frederique Overdijk	2019	2026	70	414	36	0	0	9.20	703	43	7/3	18.06	9	0	
41	Annemijn Thomson	2019	2024	17	41	9*	0	0	5.12	–	–	–	–	2	0	
42	Frederique van Arkel	2019	2019	2	3	3	0	0	1.50	–	–	–	–	0	0	
43	Mikkie Zwilling	2019	2023	6	0	0	0	0	0.00	60	5	3/8	12.80	3	0	
44	Gwen Bloemen	2019	2019	1	0	0*	0	0	–	12	0	–	–	0	0	
45	Isabel van der Woning	2021	2026	37	13	5*	0	0	2.60	438	20	4/14	27.85	1	0	
46	Robyn van Oosterom	2022	2023	3	0	0	0	0	0.00	–	–	–	–	0	0	
47	Phebe Molkenboer	2023	2026	59	795	91*	2	0	18.06	228	12	3/11	14.33	10	0	
48	Merel Dekeling	2023	2026	27	37	9	0	0	5.28	180	6	2/15	31.16	3	0	
49	Carlijn van Koolwijk	2023	2025	18	49	11	0	0	5.44	18	1	1/8	21.00	5	0	
50	Fenna Vermeire†	2023	2023	1	–	–	–	–	–	–	–	–	–	1	1	
51	Myrthe van den Raad	2023	2026	23	63	20	0	0	7.00	66	2	1/16	57.50	4	0	
52	Sanya Khurana	2024	2026	28	214	43*	0	0	16.46	12	1	1/10	10.00	5	0	
53	Madison Landsman	2024	2024	1	36	36	0	0	36.00	24	2	2/12	6.00	2	0	
54	Lilli Hamilton	2025	2025	4	–	–	–	–	–	78	4	3/13	15.50	1	0	
55	Lara Leemhuis	2025	2025	2	–	–	–	–	–	18	1	1/13	28.00	2	0	
56	Rosalie Ann Lawrence	2026	2026	1	1	1	0	0	1.00	–	–	–	–	0	0	

== See also ==
- List of Netherlands women Test cricketers
- List of Netherlands women ODI cricketers
