= Frederique Overdijk =

Dutch cricketer (born 2000)

Personal information
- Full name: Frederique CJ Overdijk
- Born: 12 April 2000 (age 26); Netherlands
- Batting: Right-handed
- Bowling: Right arm medium

International information
- National side: Netherlands (2019–present)
- ODI debut (cap 86): 22 August 2022 v Ireland
- Last ODI: 12 August 2024 v Scotland
- T20I debut (cap 40): 8 August 2019 v Ireland
- Last T20I: 16 August 2024 v Scotland

Career statistics
Competition	WODI	WT20I
Matches	13	37
Runs scored	224	162
Batting average	20.36	7.72
100s/50s	0/0	0/0
Top score	47*	25
Balls bowled	288	393
Wickets	9	27
Bowling average	28.00	14.66
5 wickets in innings	0	1
10 wickets in match	0	0
Best bowling	3/39	7/3
Catches/stumpings	2/–	6/–
- Source: Cricinfo, 22 August 2024

Frederique CJ Overdijk (born 12 April 2000) is a Dutch cricketer. She is best known for her right-arm medium bowling.

== Career ==
In August 2019, Overdijk was named in the Dutch Women's Twenty20 International (WT20I) squad for the 2019 Netherlands Women's Quadrangular Series. Overdijk made her WT20I debut for the Netherlands, against Ireland, on 8 August 2019. Later the same month, Overdijk was named in the Dutch squad for the 2019 ICC Women's World Twenty20 Qualifier tournament in Scotland.

In August 2021, Overdijk was named in the Dutch squad for the 2021 ICC Women's T20 World Cup Europe Qualifier. In the Netherlands' second match of the tournament, against France, Overdijk became the first bowler, male or female, to take seven wickets in a T20I match, taking seven wickets for three runs in the four overs she bowled. Her record breaking figures were equalled in October 2022, by Alison Stocks for Argentina against Peru.

In October 2021, she was named in the Dutch team for the 2021 Women's Cricket World Cup Qualifier tournament in Zimbabwe.
