= Robine Rijke =

Dutch cricketer

Personal information
- Born: 1 September 1996 (age 30); The Hague, Netherlands
- Batting: Right-handed
- Bowling: Right-arm medium
- Role: Bowler

International information
- National side: Netherlands
- ODI debut (cap 88): 22 August 2022 v Ireland
- Last ODI: 12 August 2024 v Scotland
- T20I debut (cap 29): 7 July 2018 v UAE
- Last T20I: 16 August 2024 v Scotland
- Source: ESPNcricinfo, 5 October 2024

Robine Rijke (born 1 September 1996) is a Dutch cricketer. She played for the Netherlands women's national cricket team in the 2015 ICC Women's World Twenty20 Qualifier in November 2015.

In June 2018, she was named in the Netherlands' squad for the 2018 ICC Women's World Twenty20 Qualifier tournament. She made her Women's Twenty20 International (WT20I) debut for the Netherlands against the United Arab Emirates in the World Twenty20 Qualifier on 7 July 2018. However, two days later she was suspended from bowling in international matches, after her bowling action was deemed to be illegal.

In May 2019, she was named in Netherlands' squad for the 2019 ICC Women's Qualifier Europe tournament in Spain. In August 2019, she was named in the Dutch squad for the 2019 ICC Women's World Twenty20 Qualifier tournament in Scotland. However, on 31 August 2019, the International Cricket Council (ICC) announced that her bowling action was illegal, and she was suspended from bowling in international cricket matches. In November 2021, the ICC declared that Rijke's action was now legal following a re-assessment.

In October 2021, she was named in the Dutch team for the 2021 Women's Cricket World Cup Qualifier tournament in Zimbabwe.

Rijke was named MVP of the first edition of the Women's European Cricket Championship in December 2023.

== Outside cricket ==
Rijke combines playing international cricket with working for SISAR B.V., the sponsor of the Dutch women's cricket team.
