= Scotland women's national cricket team =

Cricket team

Scotland
- Association: Cricket Scotland

Personnel
- Captain: Kathryn Bryce
- Coach: Craig Wallace

International Cricket Council
- ICC status: Associate member (1994)
- ICC region: Europe
ICC Rankings	Current	Best-ever
T20I	12th	11th (11 Oct 2018)

One Day Internationals
- First ODI: v England at Bradfield College, Bradfield; 10 August 2001
- Last ODI: v Netherlands at New Williamfield, Stirling; 31 August 2026
ODIs	Played	Won/Lost
Total	24	10/14 (0 ties, 0 no results)
This year	2	1/1 (0 ties, 0 no results)
- Women's World Cup Qualifier appearances: 4 (first in 2003)
- Best result: Champions (2003)

T20 Internationals
- First T20I: v. Uganda at VRA Cricket Ground, Amstelveen; 7 July 2018
- Last T20I: v. Pakistan at Seven Districts Ground, Ajman; 22 November 2026
T20Is	Played	Won/Lost
Total	95	55/39 (1 ties, 0 no results)
This year	22	12/10 (0 ties, 0 no results)
- T20 World Cup Qualifier appearances: 3 (first in 2015)
- Best result: 3rd (2018)
- Official website: www.cricketscotland.com
ODI kit
T20I kit
- As of 22 November 2026

The Scotland national cricket team represents Scotland in international women's cricket. The team is organised by Cricket Scotland, an associate member of the International Cricket Council (ICC).

Scotland was involved in the first international women's cricket match, when they played against England in August 1932. The team played sporadically throughout the remainder of the 20th century, with regular competition beginning only in 2000. Scotland's first international tournament was the 2001 European Championship, where matches held One Day International (ODI) status.

In April 2018, the ICC granted full Women's Twenty20 International (WT20I) status to all its members. Therefore, all Twenty20 matches played between Scotland women and another international side after 1 July 2018 have the full WT20I status. In May 2022, the ICC announced Scotland as one of five women's sides to gain ODI status. Netherlands, Papua New Guinea, Thailand and the United States are the other four teams. In 2024, Scotland created history by reaching their first ever senior global tournament, as they qualified for the 2024 ICC Women's T20 World Cup.

== History ==
In August 1932 (94 years ago), a Scottish women's team played England at New Road, Worcester, in what was the first international women's cricket fixture. Four members of the inaugural Scottish women's side – Betty Snowball, Myrtle Maclagan, Joy Liebert, and Betty Archdale – later played in Test matches for England. After 1932, a Scottish women's team was not raised again until 1979, when a fixture was played against a Junior England team at Malvern College, Worcestershire.

Scotland made their international tournament debut at the 2001 edition of the Women's European Championship. They lost all three games, finishing last in the four-team tournament. Two years later, they played in the 2003 IWCC Trophy, the inaugural edition of what is now known simply as the World Cup Qualifier. They finished fifth in the six-team tournament, which was hosted by the Netherlands, with their only win coming against Japan.

They again played in the European Championship in 2005, but again went without a win and finished last. In 2008 they competed in the Women's World Cup qualifier in South Africa, finishing sixth in the tournament.

In 2014, Scotland was promoted to Division 2 of the Women's County Championship after losing only one game throughout the season. However, they suffered relegation the following season. In 2015, Scotland participated in the ICC Women's World Twenty20 Qualifiers for the first time, finishing fourth at the tournament in Thailand.

In April 2018, Kathryn Bryce was named the captain of the team. In July 2018, Scotland played its first official T20 international match against Uganda in the 2018 ICC Women's World Twenty20 Qualifier in the Netherlands.

In December 2020, the ICC announced the qualification pathway for the 2023 ICC Women's T20 World Cup. Scotland was named in the 2021 ICC Women's T20 World Cup Europe Qualifier regional group, alongside five other teams.

Mark Coles resigned as head coach in January 2022. He was replaced by Peter Ross on an interim basis in March 2022, through to the end of the 2022 ICC Women's T20 World Cup Qualifier in the UAE.

In October 2024, Scotland made their first appearance at a Women's T20 World Cup thanks to reaching the final of the 10-team global qualifier, defeating higher-ranked teams such as Thailand and Ireland en route to the final. They were knocked out in the group stages of the World Cup, after defeats to Bangladesh, West Indies, South Africa and England.

== Tournament history ==
=== ICC Women's Cricket World Cup Qualifier ===
ICC Women's Cricket World Cup Qualifier records
Host Year	Round	Position	GP	W	L	T	NR
(Netherlands) 2003	Group stage	–	5	1	4	0	0
(South Africa) 2008	Group stage	–	3	0	3	0	0
(Bangladesh) 2011	Did not qualify to the global qualifiers tournament						
(Sri Lanka) 2017	Group stage	–	4	1	3	0	0
~~(Zimbabwe) 2021~~	Tournament postponed due to COVID-19 pandemic						
(Pakistan) 2025	Round-robin	–	5	2	3	0	0
2029	To be determined						
Total	4/6	0 Title	17	4	13	0	0

=== ICC Women's T20 World Cup ===
Twenty20 World Cup Record
Year	Round	Position	GP	W	L	T	NR
(England) 2009	Did not qualify						
(Cricket West Indies) 2010	Did not qualify						
(Sri Lanka) 2012	Did not qualify						
(Bangladesh) 2014	Did not qualify						
(India) 2016	Did not qualify						
(Cricket West Indies) 2018	Did not qualify						
(Australia) 2020	Did not qualify						
(South Africa) 2023	Did not qualify						
(United Arab Emirates) 2024	Group stages	–	4	0	4	0	0
(England) 2026	To be determined						
Total	1/9	0 Title	4	0	4	0	0

=== ICC Women's T20 World Cup Qualifier ===
ICC Women's World Twenty20 Qualifier records
Year	Round	Position	GP	W	L	T	NR
(Republic of Ireland) 2013	Did not qualify						
(Thailand) 2015	Did not qualify	4/8	5	2	3	0	0
(Netherlands) 2018	Did not qualify	3/8	5	3	2	0	0
(Scotland) 2019	Did not qualify	5/8	5	3	2	0	0
(United Arab Emirates) 2022	Did not qualify	6/8	5	2	3	0	0
(United Arab Emirates) 2024	Qualified	2/10	6	4	2	0	0
(Nepal) 2025	To be determined						
Total	5/6	0 Title	26	14	12	0	0

=== ICC Women's Twenty20 World Cup Europe Qualifiers ===
ICC Women's World Twenty20 Qualifiers records
Host/Year	Round	Position	GP	W	L	T	NR
(Spain) 2019	Runners-up; Advanced to Global Qualifiers	2/3	4	3	1	0	0
(Spain) 2021	Champion; Advanced to Global Qualifiers	1/5	4	4	0	0	0
Total	2/2	1 Title	8	7	1	0	0

=== ICC Women's Twenty20 World Cup Europe Qualifiers Division One ===
ICC Women's Twenty20 World Cup Europe Qualifiers Division One records
Host/Year	Round	Position	GP	W	L	T	NR
(Scotland) 2023	Champion; Advanced to Global Qualifiers	1/4	6	5	1	0	0
(Netherlands) 2025	Did not participate						
Total	1/2	1 Title	6	5	1	0	0

=== Commonwealth Games Qualifier ===
- 2022: 3rd (DNQ)

=== European Championship ===
- 1989 to 1999: Did not participate
- 2001: 4th place
- 2005: 5th place
- 2007: 4th place
- 2012: 3rd place
- 2014: 3rd place
- 2016: 1st place

== Records and statistics ==
International Match Summary — Scotland Women

Last updated 22 November 2026

Playing record
Format	M	W	L	T	NR	Inaugural match
One Day Internationals	24	10	14	0	0	10 August 2001
Twenty20 Internationals	95	55	39	1	0	12 July 2018

=== Women's One Day International ===
- Highest team total: 268/7 (50 overs) v. Ireland on 18 April 2025 at Gaddafi Stadium, Lahore.
- Highest individual innings: 131*, Kathryn Bryce v. Ireland on 18 April 2025 at Gaddafi Stadium, Lahore.
- Best innings bowling: 5/41, Hannah Rainey v. Ireland on 21 October 2023 at Desert Springs Cricket Ground, Almería.

ODI record versus other nations

Records complete to Women ODI #1561. Last updated 31 August 2026.

Opponent	M	W	L	T	NR	First match	First win
ICC Full members
Bangladesh	1	0	1	0	0	15 April 2025	
England	1	0	1	0	0	10 August 2001	
Ireland	6	1	5	0	0	11 August 2001	17 October 2023
Pakistan	2	0	2	0	0	22 July 2003	
West Indies	2	1	1	0	0	23 July 2003	9 April 2025
ICC Associate members
Japan	1	1	0	0	0	25 July 2003	25 July 2003
Netherlands	6	2	4	0	0	12 August 2001	12 August 2024
Papua New Guinea	3	3	0	0	0	12 April 2024	12 April 2024
Thailand	1	1	0	0	0	13 April 2025	13 April 2025
United States	1	1	0	0	0	14 April 2024	14 April 2024

=== Women's Twenty20 International ===
- Highest team total: 204/4 v. France on 12 September 2023 at Desert Springs Cricket Ground, Almería.
- Highest individual innings: 73*, Kathryn Bryce v. Netherlands on 7 September 2019 at Lochlands Park, Arbroath.
- Best innings bowling: 5/3, Megan McColl v. France on 30 August 2021 at La Manga Club, Cartagena.

Most T20I runs for Scotland Women

Player	Runs	Average	Career span
Sarah Bryce	1,888	30.45	2018–2026
Kathryn Bryce	1,650	34.37	2018–2026
Darcey Carter	1,080	28.42	2023–2026
Ailsa Lister	807	16.81	2021–2026
Priyanaz Chatterji	645	14.33	2018–2026

Most T20I wickets for Scotland Women

Player	Wickets	Average	Career span
Kathryn Bryce	73	15.12	2018–2026
Abtaha Maqsood	73	17.72	2018–2026
Katherine Fraser	69	16.04	2019–2026
Priyanaz Chatterji	48	21.62	2018–2026
Rachel Slater	40	20.37	2022–2026

T20I record versus other nations

Records complete to WT20I #3090. Last updated 22 November 2026.

Opponent	M	W	L	T	NR	First match	First win
ICC Full members
Bangladesh	8	1	7	0	0	12 July 2018	30 May 2026
England	2	0	2	0	0	13 October 2024	
Ireland	17	8	9	0	0	8 July 2018	10 August 2019
New Zealand	1	0	1	0	0	23 June 2026	
Pakistan	1	0	1	0	0	22 November 2026	
South Africa	1	0	1	0	0	9 October 2024	
Sri Lanka	5	0	5	0	0	18 January 2022	
West Indies	2	0	2	0	0	6 October 2024	
Zimbabwe	1	1	0	0	0	22 January 2026	22 January 2026
ICC Associate members
France	3	3	0	0	0	30 August 2021	30 August 2021
Germany	3	3	0	0	0	26 June 2019	26 June 2019
Italy	2	2	0	0	0	6 September 2023	6 September 2023
Kenya	1	1	0	0	0	22 January 2022	22 January 2022
Malaysia	1	1	0	0	0	19 January 2022	19 January 2022
Namibia	3	3	0	0	0	5 September 2019	5 September 2019
Nepal	1	1	0	0	0	26 January 2026	26 January 2026
Netherlands	16	9	6	1	0	26 June 2019	9 August 2019
Papua New Guinea	7	5	2	0	0	14 July 2018	14 July 2018
Tanzania	1	1	0	0	0	21 November 2025	21 November 2025
Thailand	9	6	3	0	0	10 July 2018	10 July 2018
Uganda	3	3	0	0	0	7 July 2018	7 July 2018
United Arab Emirates	3	3	0	0	0	23 September 2022	23 September 2022
United States	4	4	0	0	0	31 August 2019	31 August 2019

Note: Scotland won a Super Over after the tied match against Netherlands.

== Current squad ==
This lists all the players who played for Scotland in the past 12 months or were named in the most recent ODI or T20I squad.

Name	Age	Batting style	Bowling style	Forms	Notes
Batters
Lorna Jack	33	Right-handed	-	ODI & T20I	
Ailsa Lister	22	Right-handed	-	ODI & T20I	
Saskia Horley	26	Right-handed	Right-arm off break	ODI & T20I	
Abbi Aitken-Drummond	35	Right-handed	Right-arm medium	ODI & T20I	
All-rounders
Priyanaz Chatterji	33	Right-handed	Right-arm medium	ODI & T20I	
Darcey Carter	21	Right-handed	Right-arm off break	ODI & T20I	
Megan McColl	26	Right-handed	Right-arm medium	ODI & T20I	
Kathryn Bryce	29	Right-handed	Right-arm medium	ODI & T20I	Captain
Katherine Fraser	21	Right-handed	Right-arm off break	ODI & T20I	
Wicket-keepers
Ellen Watson	26	Right-handed	-	ODI	
Sarah Bryce	26	Right-handed	-	ODI & T20I	Vice-captain
Spin Bowlers
Abtaha Maqsood	27	Right-handed	Right-arm leg break	ODI & T20I	
Olivia Bell	23	Right-handed	Right-arm off break	ODI & T20I	
Pace Bowlers
Chloe Abel	25	Right-handed	Right-arm medium	ODI & T20I	
Hannah Rainey	29	Right-handed	Right-arm medium	ODI & T20I	
Rachel Slater	25	Right-handed	Left-arm medium	T20I	
Gabriella Fontenla	18	Right-handed	Right-arm medium	ODI	

Updated as on 13 Oct 2024

== See also ==
- List of Scotland women ODI cricketers
- List of Scotland women Twenty20 International cricketers
