= 2022 Kwibuka Women's T20 Tournament =

International cricket tournament

- Dates: 9 – 18 June 2022
- Administrator: Rwanda Cricket Association
- Cricket format: Women's Twenty20 International
- Tournament format(s): Round-robin and play-offs
- Host: Rwanda
- Champions: Tanzania (2nd title)
- Runners-up: Kenya
- Participants: 8
- Matches: 32
- Player of the series: (Kenya) Queentor Abel
- Most runs: (Uganda) Kevin Awino (253)
- Most wickets: (Tanzania) Nasra Saidi (15)

The 2022 Kwibuka Women's T20 Tournament was a women's T20I (WT20I) cricket tournament that was held in Rwanda from 9 to 18 June 2022. This was the eighth edition of the annual Kwibuka T20 Tournament, first played in 2014 in remembrance of the victims of the 1994 genocide against the Tutsi. Matches were played at two venues in the city of Kigali – the Gahanga International Cricket Stadium and the IPRC Cricket Ground. Kenya were the defending champions, having won the 2021 edition. This was the fourth time that Kenya had won the tournament.

Eleven teams were originally announced to participate this year, compared to five in 2021, highlighting the continued growth in size and reputation of the Kwibuka tournament. Teams originally confirmed to take part were hosts Rwanda, defending champions Kenya, previous winners Tanzania and Uganda, as well as Botswana, Nigeria and, making their first appearances at the Kwibuka tournament, Brazil, Germany, Ghana, Sierra Leone and Zimbabwe. However, the tournament was later reduced to eight teams. This was the first edition of the Kwibuka tournament to feature teams from outside of Africa.

After the first three days of action, Kenya and Nigeria were unbeaten with three wins each. On day four, Tanzania maintained their 100% record by defeating the Kenyans, and moved top of the table after Nigeria tasted their first defeat after being bowled out for only 43 runs by Uganda. After the round-robin stage was completed, Kenya and the undefeated Tanzania qualified for the final, while the hosts progressed to the third-place play-off against Uganda.

On the first day of the play-offs, Germany beat Botswana to finish in seventh place, and Nigeria beat Brazil to finish fifth overall. On the final day of the competition, Uganda beat Rwanda to finish in third place, and Tanzania defeated Kenya in the final to win the tournament for a second time. Tanzania had won the tournament in their only previous appearance in 2019, but had been unable to defend the title in 2021 due to the COVID-19 pandemic.

== Squads ==
Botswana	Brazil	Germany	Kenya
Laura Mophakedi (c, wk); Olebogeng Batisani; Onneile Keitsemang; Oratile Kgeresi; Thandiwe Legabile; Amantle Letuba; Goabilwe Matome; Thapelo Modise; Shameelah Mosweu; Tebogo Motlhabaphuti; Katlego Mpuang; Mimmie Ramafifi; Florence Samanyika; Tuelo Shadrack	Roberta Moretti Avery (c); Laura Agatha; Marianne Artur; Laura Cardoso; Evelyn de Souza (wk); Renata de Sousa; Lara Moises; Nicole Monteiro; Carolina Nascimento; Maria Ribeiro; Maria Silva; Daniella Staddon; Lindsay Vilas Boas	Anuradha Doddaballapur (c); Milena Beresford; Stephanie Frohnmayer; Christina Gough; Wilhelmina Hornero-Garcia; Asmita Kohli; Shravya Kolcharam; Sharmaine Mannan; Suzanne McAnanama-Brereton; Antonia Meyenborg; Janet Ronalds; Sharanya Sadarangani (wk); Karthika Vijayaraghavan (wk); Peris Wadenpohl	Queentor Abel (c); Sharon Juma (vc, wk); Veronica Abuga; Josephine Abwom; Lavendah Idambo; Melvin Khagoitsa; Mary Mwangi; Monicah Ndhambi; Daisy Njoroge; Mercyline Ochieng; Flavia Odhiambo; Kelvia Ogola; Venasa Ooko; Esther Wachira; Sarah Wetoto
Nigeria	Rwanda	Tanzania	Uganda
Blessing Etim (c); Favour Eseigbe (vc); Kehinde Abdulquadri; Taiwo Abdulqadri; Rukayat Abdulrasak; Omonye Asika; Sarah Etim (wk); Chinyenum George; Abigail Igbobie (wk); Miracle Imimole; Agatha Obulor; Racheal Samson; Esther Sandy; Salome Sunday; Lillian Udeh	Marie Bimenyimana (c); Sifa Ingabire; Alice Ikuzwe; Flora Irakoze; Gisele Ishimwe; Henriette Ishimwe; Immaculee Muhawenimana; Belise Murekatete; Josiane Nyirankundineza; Cathia Uwamahoro; Clarisse Uwase; Merveille Uwase (wk); Sarah Uwera (wk); Margueritte Vumiliya	Fatuma Kibasu (c); Nasra Saidi (vc); Zinaida Jeremiah; Sophia Jerome; Perice Kamunya; Linda Massawe (wk); Shufaa Mohamedi (wk); Saum Mtae; Hudaa Omary; Tabu Omary; Neema Pius; Agnes Qwele; Tatu Shabani; Mwanaidi Swedy	Concy Aweko (c); Janet Mbabazi (vc); Sarah Akiteng; Evelyn Anyipo; Kevin Awino (wk); Leona Babirye; Naome Bagenda; Susan Kakai; Phiona Kulume; Patricia Malemikia; Rita Musamali; Gloria Obukor; Shakirah Sadick; Sarah Walaza

== Round-robin ==
=== Points table ===
Pos	Team	Pld	W	L	NR	Pts	NRR
1	Tanzania	7	7	0	0	14	2.415
2	Kenya	7	6	1	0	12	1.366
3	Uganda	7	5	2	0	10	3.097
4	Rwanda	7	4	3	0	8	0.529
5	Nigeria	7	3	4	0	6	−0.474
6	Brazil	7	2	5	0	4	−2.526
7	Botswana	7	1	6	0	2	−1.448
8	Germany	7	0	7	0	0	−2.782

Source: ESPN Cricinfo

Advanced to the final
Advanced to the third-place play-off
Advanced to the fifth-place play-off
Advanced to the seventh-place play-off

=== Fixtures ===
==== Day one ====
9 June 2022
09:30
Scorecard

Rwanda; 68 (19.1 overs)	v	Uganda; 69/4 (14 overs)
Margueritte Vumiliya 16 (11); Concy Aweko 2/12 (4 overs)		Gloria Obukor 34* (45); Belise Murekatete 1/9 (2 overs)

Uganda won by 6 wickets
Gahanga International Cricket Stadium, Kigali
Umpires: John Mayeku (Uga) and Itangishaka Olivier (Rwa)
Player of the match: Concy Aweko (Uga)

- Rwanda won the toss and elected to bat.

9 June 2022
09:30
Scorecard

Kenya; 137/6 (20 overs)	v	Botswana; 102/7 (20 overs)
Sarah Wetoto 33 (20); Florence Samanyika 2/15 (4 overs)		Thapelo Modise 61* (59); Mary Mwangi 3/18 (3 overs)

Kenya won by 35 runs
IPRC Cricket Ground, Kigali
Umpires: Eric Dusabemungu (Rwa) and Temitope Onikoyi (Nga)
Player of the match: Mary Mwangi (Ken)

- Kenya won the toss and elected to bat.
- Oratile Kgeresi (Bot) made her WT20I debut.
- Mary Mwangi became the first bowler for Kenya to take a hat-trick in WT20Is.

9 June 2022
13:30
Scorecard

Brazil; 53 (15.2 overs)	v	Nigeria; 56/2 (10.5 overs)
Evelyn de Souza 12 (22); Rukayat Abdulrasak 4/9 (3.2 overs)		Salome Sunday 22* (17); Nicole Monteiro 1/4 (3 overs)

Nigeria won by 8 wickets
Gahanga International Cricket Stadium, Kigali
Umpires: Gaston Niyibizi (Rwa) and Vicky Prajapati (Rwa)
Player of the match: Favour Eseigbe (Nga)

- Nigeria won the toss and elected to field.
- Carolina Nascimento, Maria Silva (Bra) and Rukayat Abdulrasak (Nga) all made their WT20I debuts.

==== Day two ====
10 June 2022
09:30
Scorecard

Uganda; 96/8 (20 overs)	v	Kenya; 97/7 (19.4 overs)
Leona Babirye 20 (36); Lavendah Idambo 3/13 (4 overs)		Veronica Abuga 29 (44); Evelyn Anyipo 3/13 (4 overs); Patricia Malemikia 3/13 (4 overs)

Kenya won by 3 wickets
Gahanga International Cricket Stadium, Kigali
Umpires: Eric Dusabemungu (Rwa) and John Mayeku (Uga)
Player of the match: Lavendah Idambo (Ken)

- Uganda won the toss and elected to bat.

10 June 2022
09:30
Scorecard

Tanzania; 119/4 (20 overs)	v	Botswana; 62 (16 overs)
Fatuma Kibasu 44 (51); Florence Samanyika 2/20 (4 overs)		Thandiwe Legabile 12* (14); Zinaida Jeremiah 4/14 (4 overs)

Tanzania won by 57 runs
IPRC Cricket Ground, Kigali
Umpires: Gaston Niyibizi (Rwa) and Vicky Prajapati (Rwa)
Player of the match: Zinaida Jeremiah (Tan)

- Tanzania won the toss and elected to bat.
- Agnes Qwele (Tan) made her WT20I debut.

10 June 2022
13:30
Scorecard

Rwanda; 124/6 (20 overs)	v	Brazil; 88/8 (20 overs)
Henriette Ishimwe 29* (36); Maria Ribeiro 3/28 (4 overs)		Evelyn de Souza 35 (54); Margueritte Vumiliya 2/17 (4 overs)

Rwanda won by 36 runs
Gahanga International Cricket Stadium, Kigali
Umpires: Eric Dusabemungu (Rwa) and Temitope Onikoyi (Nga)
Player of the match: Henriette Ishimwe (Rwa)

- Brazil won the toss and elected to field.
- Clarisse Uwase (Rwa) made her WT20I debut.

10 June 2022
13:30
Scorecard

Germany; 78/6 (20 overs)	v	Nigeria; 79/5 (13.4 overs)
Christina Gough 28 (49); Rachael Samson 4/13 (4 overs)		Salome Sunday 32 (40); Asmita Kohli 4/16 (3 overs)

Nigeria won by 5 wickets
IPRC Cricket Ground, Kigali
Umpires: Itangishaka Olivier (Rwa) and Vicky Prajapati (Rwa)
Player of the match: Rachael Samson (Nga)

- Nigeria won the toss and elected to field.
- Wilhelmina Hornero-Garcia and Shravya Kolcharam (Ger) both made their WT20I debuts.

==== Day three ====
11 June 2022
09:30
Scorecard

Brazil; 117/8 (20 overs)	v	Germany; 109/9 (20 overs)
Daniella Staddon 29 (43); Suzanne McAnanama-Brereton 3/12 (3 overs)		Asmita Kohli 31 (36); Renata de Sousa 1/13 (4 overs)

Brazil won by 8 runs
Gahanga International Cricket Stadium, Kigali
Umpires: Eric Dusabemungu (Rwa) and Itangishaka Olivier (Rwa)
Player of the match: Renata de Sousa (Bra)

- Germany won the toss and elected to field.
- Sharmaine Mannan (Ger) made her WT20I debut.

11 June 2022
09:30
Scorecard

Uganda; 106/6 (20 overs)	v	Tanzania; 107/5 (17.3 overs)
Kevin Awino 55* (69); Nasra Saidi 2/12 (4 overs)		Saum Mtae 26 (27); Sarah Akiteng 3/23 (4 overs)

Tanzania won by 5 wickets
IPRC Cricket Ground, Kigali
Umpires: John Mayeku (Uga) and Gaston Niyibizi (Rwa)
Player of the match: Perice Kamunya (Tan)

- Uganda won the toss and elected to bat.

11 June 2022
13:30
Scorecard

Rwanda; 113/4 (20 overs)	v	Kenya; 114/6 (19.4 overs)
Gisele Ishimwe 56* (56); Queentor Abel 1/11 (3 overs)		Venasa Ooko 57* (55); Henriette Ishimwe 2/19 (4 overs)

Kenya won by 4 wickets
Gahanga International Cricket Stadium, Kigali
Umpires: Itangishaka Olivier (Rwa) and Temitope Onikoyi (Nga)
Player of the match: Venasa Ooko (Ken)

- Rwanda won the toss and elected to bat.

11 June 2022
13:30
Scorecard

Botswana; 88/5 (20 overs)	v	Nigeria; 89/3 (15.2 overs)
Tuelo Shadrack 26* (29); Favour Eseigbe 2/8 (4 overs)		Omonye Asika 33* (50); Shameelah Mosweu 2/13 (4 overs)

Nigeria won by 7 wickets
IPRC Cricket Ground, Kigali
Umpires: John Mayeku (Uga) and Vicky Prajapati (Rwa)
Player of the match: Favour Eseigbe (Nga)

- Botswana won the toss and elected to bat.
- Sarah Etim (Nga) made her WT20I debut.

==== Day four ====
12 June 2022
09:30
Scorecard

Tanzania; 153/4 (20 overs)	v	Kenya; 115 (20 overs)
Saum Mtae 44 (29); Queentor Abel 3/21 (4 overs)		Queentor Abel 44 (37); Agnes Qwele 2/13 (3 overs

Tanzania won by 38 runs
Gahanga International Cricket Stadium, Kigali
Umpires: John Mayeku (Uga) and Vicky Prajapati (Rwa)
Player of the match: Nasra Saidi (Tan)

- Kenya won the toss and elected to field.

12 June 2022
09:30
Scorecard

Rwanda; 130/6 (20 overs)	v	Germany; 78/7 (20 overs)
Marie Bimenyimana 35 (44); Stephanie Frohnmayer 2/16 (3 overs)		Christina Gough 26 (30); Henriette Ishimwe 3/16 (4 overs)

Rwanda won by 52 runs
IPRC Cricket Ground, Kigali
Umpires: Gaston Niyibizi (Rwa) and Temitope Onikoyi (Nga)
Player of the match: Henriette Ishimwe (Rwa)

- Germany won the toss and elected to field.

12 June 2022
13:30
Scorecard

Botswana; 113 (19.2 overs)	v	Brazil; 116/5 (19 overs)
Shameelah Mosweu 22 (34); Maria Ribeiro 3/14 (3.2 overs)		Roberta Moretti Avery 52* (31); Thandiwe Legabile 2/20 (2 overs)

Brazil won by 5 wickets
Gahanga International Cricket Stadium, Kigali
Umpires: Eric Dusabemungu (Rwa) and Vicky Prajapati (Rwa)
Player of the match: Roberta Moretti Avery (Bra)

- Brazil won the toss and elected to field.

12 June 2022
13:30
Scorecard

Nigeria; 43 (16.4 overs)	v	Uganda; 44/1 (8.4 overs)
Favour Eseigbe 11 (30); Patricia Malemikia 5/6 (4 overs)		Janet Mbabazi 26* (30); Rukayat Abdulrasak 1/14 (4 overs)

Uganda won by 9 wickets
IPRC Cricket Ground, Kigali
Umpires: Gaston Niyibizi (Rwa) and Itangishaka Olivier (Rwa)
Player of the match: Patricia Malemikia (Uga)

- Uganda won the toss and elected to field.
- Patricia Malemikia (Uga) took her first five-wicket haul in WT20Is.

==== Day five ====
13 June 2022
09:30
Scorecard

Tanzania; 147/7 (20 overs)	v	Germany; 89/7 (20 overs)
Fatuma Kibasu 51 (43); Christina Gough 2/25 (3 overs)		Christina Gough 41 (50); Zinaida Jeremiah 2/8 (4 overs)

Tanzania won by 58 runs
Gahanga International Cricket Stadium, Kigali
Umpires: Eric Dusabemungu (Rwa) and Temitope Onikoyi (Nga)
Player of the match: Nasra Saidi (Tan)

- Germany won the toss and elected to field.

==== Day six ====
14 June 2022
09:30
Scorecard

Kenya; 119/5 (20 overs)	v	Nigeria; 77/4 (20 overs)
Queentor Abel 47 (50); Rukayat Abdulrasak 2/23 (4 overs)		Salome Sunday 36* (47); Sarah Wetoto 1/18 (4 overs)

Kenya won by 42 runs
Gahanga International Cricket Stadium, Kigali
Umpires: Eric Dusabemungu (Rwa) and Itangishaka Olivier (Rwa)
Player of the match: Sarah Wetoto (Ken)

- Nigeria won the toss and elected to field.
- Kelvia Ogola (Ken) made her WT20I debut.

14 June 2022
09:30
Scorecard

Rwanda; 93/7 (20 overs)	v	Tanzania; 94/5 (15.1 overs)
Marie Bimenyimana 32* (39); Tabu Omary 4/8 (4 overs)		Hudaa Omary 34* (31); Gisele Ishimwe 2/11 (3.1 overs)

Tanzania won by 5 wickets
IPRC Cricket Ground, Kigali
Umpires: John Mayeku (Uga) and Temitope Onikoyi (Nga)
Player of the match: Tabu Omary (Tan)

- Rwanda won the toss and elected to bat.

14 June 2022
13:30
Scorecard

Botswana; 92 (19.2 overs)	v	Germany; 75 (14 overs)
Oratile Kgeresi 16 (14); Sharanya Sadarangani 3/8 (4 overs)		Janet Ronalds 12 (17); Onneile Keitsemang 4/21 (4 overs)

Botswana won by 17 runs
Gahanga International Cricket Stadium, Kigali
Umpires: Gaston Niyibizi (Rwa) and Itangishaka Olivier (Rwa)
Player of the match: Onneile Keitsemang (Bot)

- Germany won the toss and elected to field.

14 June 2022
13:30
Scorecard

Uganda; 141/6 (20 overs)	v	Brazil; 57 (17.5 overs)
Kevin Awino 69 (63); Nicole Monteiro 4/46 (4 overs)		Lindsay Vilas Boas 31 (46); Janet Mbabazi 3/8 (3.5 overs)

Uganda won by 84 runs
IPRC Cricket Ground, Kigali
Umpires: Temitope Onikoyi (Nga) and Vicky Prajapati (Rwa)
Player of the match: Kevin Awino (Uga)

- Brazil won the toss and elected to field.

==== Day seven ====
15 June 2022
09:30
Scorecard

Botswana; 91/7 (20 overs)	v	Rwanda; 93/4 (16.4 overs)
Laura Mophakedi 22 (21); Gisele Ishimwe 2/14 (4 overs)		Cathia Uwamahoro 27 (28); Tuelo Shadrack 1/7 (1 over)

Rwanda won by 6 wickets
Gahanga International Cricket Stadium, Kigali
Umpires: John Mayeku (Uga) and Vicky Prajapati (Rwa)
Player of the match: Gisele Ishimwe (Rwa)

- Botswana won the toss and elected to bat.

15 June 2022
09:30
Scorecard

Uganda; 213/1 (20 overs)	v	Germany; 46 (18.5 overs)
Kevin Awino 95* (61); Christina Gough 1/16 (1.4 overs)		Asmita Kohli 9 (11); Sarah Akiteng 4/3 (4 overs)

Uganda won by 167 runs
IPRC Cricket Ground, Kigali
Umpires: Gaston Niyibizi (Rwa) and Itangishaka Olivier (Rwa)
Player of the match: Sarah Akiteng (Uga)

- Germany won the toss and elected to field.

15 June 2022
13:30
Scorecard

Nigeria; 62 (19.5 overs)	v	Tanzania; 63/3 (12.2 overs)
Esther Sandy 16 (25); Tabu Omary 2/7 (4 overs)		Fatuma Kibasu 33 (34); Racheal Samson 1/11 (2 overs)

Tanzania won by 7 wickets
Gahanga International Cricket Stadium, Kigali
Umpires: Eric Dusabemungu (Rwa) and John Mayeku (Uga)
Player of the match: Tabu Omary (Tan)

- Nigeria won the toss and elected to bat.

15 June 2022
13:30
Scorecard

Kenya; 184/3 (20 overs)	v	Brazil; 82 (18.3 overs)
Queentor Abel 51 (35); Carolina Nascimento 1/29 (2 overs)		Renata de Sousa 26 (38); Mercyline Ochieng 3/11 (4 overs)

Kenya won by 102 runs
IPRC Cricket Ground, Kigali
Umpires: Gaston Niyibizi (Rwa) and Temitope Onikoyi (Nga)
Player of the match: Sarah Wetoto (Ken)

- Kenya won the toss and elected to bat.

==== Day eight ====
16 June 2022
09:30
Scorecard

Botswana; 35 (18.5 overs)	v	Uganda; 36/1 (7.3 overs)
Thandiwe Legabile 7* (18); Concy Aweko 3/5 (3.5 overs)		Kevin Awino 18* (20); Florence Samanyika 1/15 (2 overs)

Uganda won by 9 wickets
Gahanga International Cricket Stadium, Kigali
Umpires: Gaston Niyibizi (Rwa) and Vicky Prajapati (Rwa)
Player of the match: Janet Mbabazi (Uga)

- Uganda Women won the toss and elected to field.
- Amantle Letuba (Bot) made her WT20I debut.

16 June 2022
09:30
Scorecard

Rwanda; 91/7 (20 overs)	v	Nigeria; 68/6 (20 overs)
Sarah Uwera 32 (42); Chinyenum George 3/18 (4 overs)		Blessing Etim 29* (47); Marie Bimenyimana 2/17 (4 overs)

Rwanda won by 23 runs
IPRC Cricket Ground, Kigali
Umpires: Itangishaka Olivier (Rwa) and Temitope Onikoyi (Nga)
Player of the match: Marie Bimenyimana (Rwa)

- Nigeria Women won the toss and elected to field.

16 June 2022
13:30
Scorecard

Kenya; 119/5 (20 overs)	v	Germany; 75/4 (20 overs)
Queentor Abel 24 (24); Sharanya Sadarangani 1/17 (4 overs)		Christina Gough 47* (51); Queentor Abel 1/16 (4 overs)

Kenya won by 44 runs
Gahanga International Cricket Stadium, Kigali
Umpires: Eric Dusabemungu (Rwa) and Vicky Prajapati (Rwa)
Player of the match: Queentor Abel (Ken)

- Kenya won the toss and elected to bat.
- Josephine Abwom (Ken) made her WT20I debut.

16 June 2022
13:30
Scorecard

Brazil; 57 (19.1 overs)	v	Tanzania; 58/0 (7.3 overs)
Laura Cardoso 17 (18); Tabu Omary 3/9 (3.1 overs)		Shufaa Mohamedi 24* (22)

Tanzania won by 10 wickets
IPRC Cricket Ground, Kigali
Umpires: John Mayeku (Uga) and Itangishaka Olivier (Rwa)
Player of the match: Tabu Omary (Tan)

- Brazil won the toss and elected to bat.

== Play-offs ==
=== 7th-place play-off ===
17 June 2022
09:30
Scorecard

Botswana; 107/4 (20 overs)	v	Germany; 108/4 (16.1 overs)
Florence Samanyika 41 (61); Stephanie Frohnmayer 2/19 (4 overs)		Wilhelmina Hornero-Garcia 38* (35); Florence Samanyika 2/20 (4 overs)

Germany won by 6 wickets
Gahanga International Cricket Stadium, Kigali
Umpires: John Mayeku (Uga) and Temitope Onikoyi (Nga)
Player of the match: Stephanie Frohnmayer (Ger)

- Botswana won the toss and elected to bat.

=== 5th-place play-off ===
17 June 2022
13:30
Scorecard

Nigeria; 113/4 (20 overs)	v	Brazil; 83/7 (20 overs)
Salome Sunday 32 (29); Carolina Nascimento 1/15 (4 overs)		Laura Cardoso 31* (43); Racheal Samson 1/5 (4 overs)

Nigeria won by 30 runs
Gahanga International Cricket Stadium, Kigali
Umpires: Eric Dusabemungu (Rwa) and Gaston Niyibizi (Rwa)
Player of the match: Chinyenum George (Nga)

- Nigeria won the toss and elected to bat.

=== 3rd-place play-off ===
18 June 2022
09:00
Scorecard

Rwanda; 50 (17.2 overs)	v	Uganda; 54/2 (9.4 overs)
Henriette Ishimwe 12 (16); Concy Aweko 3/7 (3 overs)		Rita Musamali 17* (26); Belise Murekatete 2/20 (4 overs)

Uganda won by 8 wickets
Gahanga International Cricket Stadium, Kigali
Umpires: Temitope Onikoyi (Nga) and Vicky Prajapati (Rwa)
Player of the match: Concy Aweko (Uga)

- Uganda won the toss and elected to field.

=== Final ===
18 June 2022
13:00
Scorecard

Tanzania; 114 (20 overs)	v	Kenya; 70 (20 overs)
Perice Kamunya 29 (24); Queentor Abel 2/19 (4 overs)		Esther Wachira 17 (34); Nasra Saidi 3/12 (4 overs)

Tanzania won by 44 runs
Gahanga International Cricket Stadium, Kigali
Umpires: John Mayeku (Uga) and Itangishaka Olivier (Rwa)
Player of the match: Perice Kamunya (Tan)

- Tanzania won the toss and elected to bat.
