= 2025 Women's T20 World Cup Europe Qualifier =

Women's international cricket tournament

The 2025 ICC Women's T20 World Cup Europe Qualifier was a cricket tournament that formed part of the qualification process for the 2026 Women's T20 World Cup. The first stage of the tournament was Division Two which took place in Italy from 25 to 29 May 2025. Six teams competed in Division Two, with the top two sides progressing to Division One, which was held in the Netherlands from 20 to 27 August 2025. Isle of Man competed in the women's qualifier for the first time. The Division Two match between Jersey and Sweden was the first time two bowlers from opposite teams – Chloe Greechan and Gaya Jayaweera – had taken hat-tricks in the same international match, across all formats and genders.

The top two teams in Division One advanced to the Global Qualifier. Ireland and Netherlands secured the qualification places.

== Teams ==
Division Two	Division One
Germany; Isle of Man; Italy; Jersey; Spain; Sweden	Germany; Ireland; Italy; Netherlands

== Division Two ==
2025 ICC Women's T20 World Cup Europe Qualifier Division Two
- Dates: 25 – 29 May 2025
- Administrator: ICC Europe
- Cricket format: Twenty20 International
- Tournament format: Round-robin
- Host: Italy
- Champions: Italy
- Runners-up: Germany
- Participants: 6
- Matches: 15
- Most runs: (Italy) Dilaisha Nanayakkara (173)
- Most wickets: (Spain) Uswa Syed (9) (Jersey) Grace Wetherall (9)

=== Squads ===
Germany	Isle of Man	Italy	Jersey	Spain	Sweden
Asmita Kohli (c); Karthika Vijayaraghavan (vc, wk); Ashwini Balaji; Milena Beresford; Anne Bierwisch; Iris Edwards; Christina Gough; Wilhelmina Hornero-Garcia; Ameya Kanukuntla; Nicole Kingsley; Shravya Kolcharam; Janet Ronalds; Sharanya Sadarangani; Rameesha Shahid	Alanya Thorpe (c); Lucy Barnett; Kim Carney; Clare Crowe; Georgina Ford; Sam Hassall; Caitlin Henery; Joanne Hicks; Lola Hornby-Wheeler; Danielle Murphy; Rachel Overman; Catherine Perry; Rebecca Webster (wk)	Emilia Bartram (c); Dilaisha Nanayakkara (vc); Teshani Araliya; Nimesha Ekanayake; Ishara Jayamannage; Pasindi Kanankege; Alexia Kontopirakis; Chathurika Mahamalage; Emma Moore; Kumudu Peddrick; Chloe Piparo; Methnara Rathnayake (wk); Ilenia Sims; Annie Wikman	Chloe Greechan (c); Aimee Aikenhead; Olivia Bastin; Kate Follain; Lily Greig; Nia Greig; Mia Maguire (wk); Georgia Mallet; Analise Merritt; Annabel Mossop; Trinity Smith; Tallulah Spry; Florence Tanguy; Grace Wetherall	Elspeth Fowler (c); Samaia Basharat; Amy Brown-Carrera; Payal Chilongia; Andrea Davidson-Soler; Alexis Hartley; Naomi Hillman-Bermejo; Amelia Jones (wk); Tashiba Mirza (wk); Mardiya Mohammad; Rabia Mushtaq; Muskan Naseeb; Memoona Riaz; Uswa Syed	Kanchan Rana (c); Eman Asim; Hareer Chamto; Imali Jayasooriya; Gaya Jayaweera; Zara Mohammad; Surya Ravuri; Hariharan Shreya; Gunjan Shukla; Abhilasha Singh; Rashmi Somashekhar; Elsa Thelander (wk); Anya Vaidya; Malyun Yusuf

=== Points table ===
Pos	Team	Pld	W	L	NR	Pts	NRR	Qualification
1	Italy	5	5	0	0	10	2.273	Advanced to Division One
2	Germany	5	4	1	0	8	0.540	Advanced to Division One
3	Jersey	5	2	3	0	4	0.781	
4	Sweden	5	2	3	0	4	−1.318	
5	Spain	5	1	4	0	2	−1.032	
6	Isle of Man	5	1	4	0	2	−1.164	

Source: ESPNcricinfo

=== Fixtures ===
25 May 2025
10:15
Scorecard

Jersey; 162/9 (20 overs)	v	Italy; 163/3 (19 overs)
Analise Merritt 77 (56); Kumudu Peddrick 3/28 (4 overs)		Dilaisha Nanayakkara 86 (54); Florence Tanguy 2/26 (4 overs)

Italy won by 7 wickets
Roma Cricket Ground, Rome
Umpires: Mark Jameson (Ger) and David McLean (Sco)
Player of the match: Dilaisha Nanayakkara (Ita)

- Italy won the toss and elected to field.
- Alexia Kontopirakis, Chloe Piparo, Annie Wikman (Ita) and Annabel Mossop (Jer) all made their T20I debuts.

25 May 2025
10:15
Scorecard

Sweden; 104/7 (20 overs)	v	Spain; 91/8 (20 overs)
Eman Asim 30 (50); Uswa Syed 2/21 (4 overs)		Naomi Hillman-Bermejo 34* (38); Zara Mohammad 2/21 (4 overs)

Sweden won by 13 runs
Simar Cricket Ground, Rome
Umpires: Shanaka Fernando (Ita) and Stuart Hodgson (Jer)
Player of the match: Eman Asim (Swe)

- Sweden won the toss and elected to bat.
- Amelia Jones (Esp) and Gaya Jayaweera (Swe) both made their T20I debuts.

25 May 2025
15:00
Scorecard

Isle of Man; 88 (14.5 overs)	v	Italy; 89/2 (9.4 overs)
Caitlin Henery 19 (15); Chathurika Mahamalage 3/19 (4 overs)		Emilia Bartram 37* (22); Lucy Barnett 2/24 (4 overs)

Italy won by 8 wickets
Roma Cricket Ground, Rome
Umpires: David McLean (Sco) and Maulik Prabhudesai (Ned)
Player of the match: Emilia Bartram (Ita)

- Isle of Man won the toss and elected to bat.

25 May 2025
15:00
Scorecard

Germany; 139/4 (20 overs)	v	Spain; 111/3 (20 overs)
Christina Gough 30* (27); Rabia Mushtaq 2/33 (3 overs)		Amelia Jones 39* (66); Asmita Kohli 1/19 (4 overs)

Germany won by 28 runs
Simar Cricket Ground, Rome
Umpires: Stuart Hodgson (Jer) and Iain McDonald (Sco)
Player of the match: Christina Gough (Ger)

- Spain won the toss and elected to field.

26 May 2025
10:15
Scorecard

Germany; 106/6 (20 overs)	v	Jersey; 99/8 (20 overs)
Janet Ronalds 35 (44); Grace Wetherall 4/17 (4 overs)		Analise Merritt 25 (21); Asmita Kohli 2/15 (4 overs)

Germany won by 7 runs
Roma Cricket Ground, Rome
Umpires: Mark Jameson (Ger) and Iain McDonald (Sco)
Player of the match: Janet Ronalds (Ger)

- Germany won the toss and elected to bat.

26 May 2025
10:15
Scorecard

Sweden; 123/3 (20 overs)	v	Isle of Man; 124/3 (11.3 overs)
Eman Asim 29 (34); Alanya Thorpe 1/12 (3 overs)		Lucy Barnett 77 (47); Surya Ravuri 1/8 (1 over)

Isle of Man won by 7 wickets
Simar Cricket Ground, Rome
Umpires: Stuart Hodgson (Jer) and Maulik Prabhudesai (Ned)
Player of the match: Lucy Barnett (IoM)

- Sweden won the toss and elected to bat.

26 May 2025
15:00
Scorecard

Spain; 94/7 (20 overs)	v	Jersey; 95/3 (11 overs)
Alexis Hartley 41 (38); Olivia Bastin 1/13 (4 overs)		Aimee Aikenhead 32* (34); Payal Chilongia 1/19 (2 overs)

Jersey won by 7 wickets
Roma Cricket Ground, Rome
Umpires: Shanaka Fernando (Ita) and Iain McDonald (Sco)
Player of the match: Aimee Aikenhead (Jer)

- Jersey won the toss and elected to field.

26 May 2025
15:00
Scorecard

Sweden; 118/5 (20 overs)	v	Italy; 120/0 (11.2 overs)
Eman Asim 58 (56); Emilia Bartram 1/11 (3 overs)		Dilaisha Nanayakkara 58* (43)

Italy won by 10 wickets
Simar Cricket Ground, Rome
Umpires: David McLean (Sco) and Maulik Prabhudesai (Ned)
Player of the match: Dilaisha Nanayakkara (Ita)

- Sweden won the toss and elected to bat.

28 May 2025
10:15
Scorecard

Italy; 148/6 (20 overs)	v	Germany; 114/6 (20 overs)
Chloe Piparo 74* (55); Janet Ronalds 2/24 (4 overs)		Christina Gough 28 (37); Emilia Bartram 1/13 (3 overs); Pasindi Kanankege 1/13 (3 overs)

Italy won by 34 runs
Roma Cricket Ground, Rome
Umpires: Iain McDonald (Sco) and Maulik Prabhudesai (Ned)
Player of the match: Chloe Piparo (Ita)

- Germany won the toss and elected to field.

28 May 2025
10:15
Scorecard

Isle of Man; 86 (19.2 overs)	v	Spain; 87/2 (15.5 overs)
Ellan Cleator 33 (51); Naomi Hillman-Bermejo 4/10 (3.2 overs)		Alexis Hartley 46* (42); Caitlin Henery 1/3 (1 over)

Spain won by 8 wickets
Simar Cricket Ground, Rome
Umpires: Shanaka Fernando (Ita) and Mark Jameson (Ger)
Player of the match: Naomi Hillman-Bermejo (Esp)

- Isle of Man won the toss and elected to bat.

28 May 2025
15:00
Scorecard

Germany; 138/7 (20 overs)	v	Sweden; 99/9 (20 overs)
Christina Gough 43 (40); Zara Mohammad 2/19 (4 overs)		Kanchan Rana 26 (29); Ashwini Balaji 3/13 (4 overs)

Germany won by 39 runs
Roma Cricket Ground, Rome
Umpires: Iain McDonald (Sco) and Maulik Prabhudesai (Ned)
Player of the match: Janet Ronalds (Ger)

- Germany won the toss and elected to bat.

28 May 2025
15:00
Scorecard

Jersey; 140/6 (20 overs)	v	Isle of Man; 91 (17.1 overs)
Trinity Smith 44 (40); Alanya Thorpe 3/25 (4 overs)		Clare Crowe 25 (32); Analise Merritt 4/22 (4 overs)

Jersey won by 49 runs
Simar Cricket Ground, Rome
Umpires: Shanaka Fernando (Ita) and David McLean (Sco)
Player of the match: Analise Merritt (Jer)

- Isle of Man won the toss and elected to field.

29 May 2025
10:15
Scorecard

Italy; 121/9 (20 overs)	v	Spain; 92/6 (20 overs)
Methnara Rathnayake 30 (33); Uswa Syed 2/17 (4 overs)		Naomi Hillman-Bermejo 35 (46); Chathurika Mahamalage 3/14 (3 overs)

Italy won by 29 runs
Roma Cricket Ground, Rome
Umpires: Mark Jameson (Ger) and David McLean (Sco)
Player of the match: Methnara Rathnayake (Ita)

- Italy won the toss and elected to bat.

29 May 2025
10:15
Scorecard

Sweden; 128/8 (20 overs)	v	Jersey; 110 (18 overs)
Eman Asim 45 (40); Chloe Greechan 4/13 (4 overs)		Aimee Aikenhead 58* (53); Gaya Jayaweera 4/11 (2 overs)

Sweden won by 18 runs
Simar Cricket Ground, Rome
Umpires: Shanaka Fernando (Ita) and Maulik Prabhudesai (Ned)
Player of the match: Gaya Jayaweera (Swe)

- Sweden won the toss and elected to bat.
- Kate Follain (Jer) and Malyun Yusuf (Swe) both made their T20I debuts.
- Chloe Greechan (Jer) took a hat-trick.
- Gaya Jayaweera became the first player for Sweden to take a hat-trick in women's T20Is.
- This was the first time two bowlers from opposite teams had taken hat-tricks in the same international match, across all formats and genders.

29 May 2025
15:00
Scorecard

Isle of Man; 139/5 (20 overs)	v	Germany; 140/2 (18 overs)
Lucy Barnett 54 (47); Janet Ronalds 2/25 (4 overs)		Shravya Kolcharam 50* (31); Lucy Barnett 1/12 (3 overs)

Germany won by 8 wickets
Roma Cricket Ground, Rome
Umpires: Mark Jameson (Ger) and Iain McDonald (Sco)
Player of the match: Shravya Kolcharam (Ger)

- Germany won the toss and elected to field.

== Division One ==
2025 ICC Women's T20 World Cup Europe Qualifier Division One
- Dates: 20 – 27 August 2025
- Administrator: ICC Europe
- Cricket format: Twenty20 International
- Tournament format: Double round-robin
- Host: Netherlands
- Champions: Ireland
- Runners-up: Netherlands
- Participants: 4
- Matches: 12
- Most runs: (Ireland) Amy Hunter (241)
- Most wickets: (Ireland) Arlene Kelly (10) (Netherlands) Iris Zwilling (10)

=== Squads ===
Germany	Ireland	Italy	Netherlands
Asmita Kohli (c); Karthika Vijayaraghavan (vc, wk); Ashwini Balaji; Iris Edwards; Christina Gough; Wilhelmina Hornero-Garcia; Ameya Kanukuntla; Nicole Kingsley; Aishani Kishore; Shravya Kolcharam; Antonia Meyenborg; Janet Ronalds; Rameesha Shahid; Verena Stolle	Gaby Lewis (c); Orla Prendergast (vc); Ava Canning; Christina Coulter Reilly (wk); Alana Dalzell; Laura Delany; Amy Hunter (wk); Arlene Kelly; Jane Maguire; Lara McBride; Cara Murray; Leah Paul; Freya Sargent; Rebecca Stokell	Emilia Bartram (c); Dilaisha Nanayakkara (vc); Teshani Araliya; Nimesha Ekanayake; Ishara Jayamannage; Pasindi Kanankege; Alexia Kontopirakis; Chathurika Mahamalage; Sadalee Malwatta; Emma Moore; Kumudu Peddrick; Chloe Piparo; Amaya Rajapaksha; Methnara Rathnayake (wk); Ilenia Sims; Annie Wikman	Babette de Leede (c, wk); Merel Dekeling; Caroline de Lange; Sanya Khurana; Hannah Landheer; Lara Leemhuis; Phebe Molkenboer; Frederique Overdijk; Robine Rijke; Heather Siegers (wk); Silver Siegers; Myrthe van den Raad; Isabel van der Woning; Iris Zwilling

=== Points table ===
Pos	Team	Pld	W	L	NR	Pts	NRR	Qualification
1	Ireland	6	6	0	0	12	3.309	Advanced to the global qualifier
2	Netherlands	6	4	2	0	8	2.833	Advanced to the global qualifier
3	Italy	6	2	4	0	4	−0.906	
4	Germany	6	0	6	0	0	−5.611	

Source: ESPNcricinfo

=== Fixtures ===
20 August 2025
11:00
Scorecard

Netherlands; 157/7 (20 overs)	v	Italy; 114/8 (20 overs)
Babette de Leede 52 (42); Emma Moore 2/33 (4 overs)		Annie Wikman 37 (29); Isabel van der Woning 2/19 (3 overs)

Netherlands won by 43 runs
Hazelaarweg Stadium, Rotterdam
Umpires: Jesper Jensen (Den) and Aidan Seaver (Ire)
Player of the match: Babette de Leede (Ned)

- Italy won the toss and elected to field.
- Amaya Rajapaksha (Ita) made her T20I debut.
- This was the first women's T20I to be played at this venue.
- Iris Zwilling (Ned) took her 100th wicket in international cricket.

20 August 2025
15:45
Scorecard

Germany; 62 (18.2 overs)	v	Ireland; 63/0 (7.3 overs)
Christina Gough 28 (39); Laura Delany 4/9 (2.2 overs)		Amy Hunter 31* (23)

Ireland won by 10 wickets
Hazelaarweg Stadium, Rotterdam
Umpires: Rizwan Akram (Ned) and Jesper Jensen (Den)
Player of the match: Laura Delany (Ire)

- Germany won the toss and elected to bat.
- Amy Hunter (Ire) played in her 50th T20I match.

21 August 2025
11:00
Scorecard

Netherlands; 137/6 (20 overs)	v	Ireland; 141/2 (19.2 overs)
Heather Siegers 27 (24); Laura Delany 2/19 (3 overs)		Gaby Lewis 66* (52); Caroline de Lange 1/19 (4 overs)

Ireland won by 8 wickets
Hazelaarweg Stadium, Rotterdam
Umpires: Rizwan Akram (Ned) and Jesper Jensen (Den)
Player of the match: Gaby Lewis (Ire)

- Netherlands won the toss and elected to bat.

21 August 2025
15:45
Scorecard

Germany; 113/6 (20 overs)	v	Italy; 117/6 (15.4 overs)
Shravya Kolcharam 35 (30); Ilenia Sims 3/8 (4 overs)		Chloe Piparo 37 (22); Iris Edwards 3/13 (3 overs)

Italy won by 4 wickets
Hazelaarweg Stadium, Rotterdam
Umpires: Jesper Jensen (Den) and Aidan Seaver (Ire)
Player of the match: Emilia Bartram (Ita)

- Italy won the toss and elected to field.

23 August 2025
11:00
Scorecard

Ireland; 166/4 (20 overs)	v	Italy; 103/7 (20 overs)
Gaby Lewis 42 (37); Ilenia Sims 2/26 (4 overs)		Chloe Piparo 29 (23); Arlene Kelly 3/7 (4 overs)

Ireland won by 63 runs
Hazelaarweg Stadium, Rotterdam
Umpires: Rizwan Akram (Ned) and Jesper Jensen (Den)
Player of the match: Arlene Kelly (Ire)

- Italy won the toss and elected to field.

23 August 2025
15:45
Scorecard

Netherlands; 255/3 (20 overs)	v	Germany; 53 (17.2 overs)
Heather Siegers 106* (55); Antonia Meyenborg 1/20 (2 overs)		Rameesha Shahid 14 (15); Iris Zwilling 3/6 (3 overs)

Netherlands won by 202 runs
Hazelaarweg Stadium, Rotterdam
Umpires: Rizwan Akram (Ned) and Aidan Seaver (Ire)
Player of the match: Heather Siegers (Ned)

- Germany won the toss and elected to field.
- Heather Siegers (Ned) scored her first century and also scored her 1,000th run in T20Is.
- Netherlands scored their highest total in T20Is.

24 August 2025
11:00
Scorecard

Ireland; 223/1 (20 overs)	v	Germany; 44/8 (20 overs)
Amy Hunter 114* (67); Rameesha Shahid 1/30 (3 overs)		Ameya Kanukuntla 9 (39); Leah Paul 2/4 (3 overs)

Ireland won by 179 runs
Hazelaarweg Stadium, Rotterdam
Umpires: Jesper Jensen (Den) and Aidan Seaver (Ire)
Player of the match: Amy Hunter (Ire)

- Ireland won the toss and elected to bat.
- Aishani Kishore (Ger) made her T20I debut.
- Ireland scored their highest total in T20Is.

24 August 2025
15:45
Scorecard

Italy; 86/9 (20 overs)	v	Netherlands; 90/3 (15.1 overs)
Emilia Bartram 29* (35); Iris Zwilling 3/14 (4 overs)		Robine Rijke 35* (31); Pasindi Kanankege 1/13 (3 overs)

Netherlands won by 7 wickets
Hazelaarweg Stadium, Rotterdam
Umpires: Rizwan Akram (Ned) and Jesper Jensen (Den)
Player of the match: Iris Zwilling (Ned)

- Italy won the toss and elected to bat.

26 August 2025
11:00
Scorecard

Germany; 108/4 (20 overs)	v	Italy; 109/2 (14 overs)
Ameya Kanukuntla 27* (41); Ilenia Sims 2/13 (4 overs)		Annie Wikman 38* (31); Ameya Kanukuntla 1/11 (3 overs)

Italy won by 8 wickets
Hazelaarweg Stadium, Rotterdam
Umpires: Rizwan Akram (Ned) and Aidan Seaver (Ire)
Player of the match: Ilenia Sims (Ita)

- Italy won the toss and elected to field.

26 August 2025
15:45
Scorecard

Netherlands; 110 (18.5 overs)	v	Ireland; 111/3 (19.1 overs)
Robine Rijke 25 (27); Arlene Kelly 5/14 (3.5 overs)		Gaby Lewis 56 (55); Hannah Landheer 2/17 (4 overs)

Ireland won by 7 wickets
Hazelaarweg Stadium, Rotterdam
Umpires: Jesper Jensen (Den) and Aidan Seaver (Ire)
Player of the match: Arlene Kelly (Ire)

- Netherlands won the toss and elected to bat.

27 August 2025
11:00
Scorecard

Netherlands; 175/4 (20 overs)	v	Germany; 110/1 (20 overs)
Phebe Molkenboer 91* (66); Rameesha Shahid 2/27 (4 overs)		Wilhelmina Hornero-Garcia 51* (57); Hannah Landheer 1/19 (4 overs)

Netherlands won by 65 runs
Hazelaarweg Stadium, Rotterdam
Umpires: Rizwan Akram (Ned) and Aidan Seaver (Ire)
Player of the match: Phebe Molkenboer (Ned)

- Netherlands won the toss and elected to bat.
- Lara Leemhuis (Ned) made her T20I debut.

27 August 2025
15:45
Scorecard

Ireland; 175/6 (20 overs)	v	Italy; 142 (18.3 overs)
Laura Delany 91 (57); Ilenia Sims 2/22 (3 overs)		Annie Wikman 53 (29); Freya Sargent 3/38 (4 overs)

Ireland won by 33 runs
Hazelaarweg Stadium, Rotterdam
Umpires: Rizwan Akram (Ned) and Jesper Jensen (Den)
Player of the match: Laura Delany (Ire)

- Ireland won the toss and elected to bat.
- Arlene Kelly captained Ireland for the first time in T20Is.
