= Emma Bargna =

German cricketer (born 2004)

Personal information
- Full name: Emma Catherine Bargna
- Born: 24 November 2004 (age 21); Munich, Bavaria, Germany
- Batting: Right-handed
- Bowling: Right-arm spin
- Role: Bowler

International information
- National side: Germany (2019–present)
- T20I debut (cap 1): 26 June 2019 v Scotland
- Last T20I: 28 July 2024 v Italy

Domestic team information
- Years: Team
- Munich

Career statistics
Competition	WT20I
Matches	25
Runs scored	2
Batting average	2.00
100s/50s	0/0
Top score	1*
Balls bowled	460
Wickets	23
Bowling average	17.95
5 wickets in innings	1
10 wickets in match	0
Best bowling	2/9
Catches/stumpings	0/0
- Source: Cricinfo, 7 October 2024

Emma Catherine Bargna (born 24 November 2004) is a German cricketer who plays for the national cricket team as a bowler. She was the first player, male or female, to take a five-wicket haul for Germany in a Twenty20 International.

== Early life and career ==
Bargna was born in Munich, but was raised partially in Wylam, Northumberland, England, where she played for the women's cricket team. After returning to Munich, she went on to play for the Bavarian Cricket Academy.

Bargna's playing role is as a spin bowler. In 2019, aged just 14, she was chosen as Germany's young cricketer of the year. The following year, she was named Germany U23's bowler of the year, and captain of the year.

== International career ==
On 26 June 2019, Bargna made her WT20I debut for Germany against Scotland at the La Manga Club Ground, Murcia, Spain, in the first match of the 2019 ICC Women's Qualifier Europe, which was also Germany's first ever WT20I. She opened the bowling, and took two wickets in her first two overs.

In February 2020, Bargna participated in a bilateral series between Germany and Oman at the Al Amerat Cricket Stadium, Muscat. She was selected to play in three of the four WT20I matches despite having broken a finger in training just two weeks earlier.

During Germany's next bilateral series, a five-WT20I contest with Austria at the Seebarn Cricket Ground near Vienna in August 2020, Bargna opened the bowling in all matches except the third one, in which she was rested due to injury. In the first match, held on 12 August 2020, she starred with 3/13 in Germany's 82-run victory. The following day, in the second match, she became the first player, male or female, to bag a five-wicket haul for Germany in a T20I. After taking wickets with the first and third balls of her first over before any run had been scored, she finished with 5/9 from four overs. Germany won the match by 138 runs, and eventually won the series 5–0. Bargna's overall figures for the series were 10/36, from 15 overs.

In July 2021, in Germany's next bilateral series, against France at the Bayer Uerdingen Cricket Ground, Krefeld, Bargna opened the bowling in four of the matches, and achieved an economy rate of 3.42, but did not take any wickets. The following month, Bargna played in one of Germany's matches in the 2021 ICC Women's T20 World Cup Europe Qualifier.

== See also ==
- List of five-wicket hauls in women's Twenty20 International cricket
- List of Germany women Twenty20 International cricketers
