= German women's cricket team in Austria in 2020 =

Germany women's cricket team in Austria in 2020
	Austria women	Germany women
- Dates: 12 – 15 August 2020
Captains	Andrea-Mae Zepeda	Anuradha Doddaballapur

Twenty20 International series
- Results: Germany women won the 5-match series 5–0
Most runs	Andrea-Mae Zepeda (77)	Christina Gough (239)
Most wickets	Soujanya Chamundaiah (2)	Emma Bargna (10)

The Germany women's cricket team toured Austria in August 2020 to play a five-match bilateral Women's Twenty20 International (WT20I) series. The matches were played at the Seebarn Cricket Ground in the Seebarn subdivision of Harmannsdorf, Lower Austria.

The series was the first women's international cricket to be played since the 2020 ICC Women's T20 World Cup Final on 8 March 2020, following widespread disruption caused by the COVID-19 pandemic. Austria had last played a match in a quadrangular series in France in August 2019, and Germany had last played an international match during their visit to Oman in February 2020.

Germany won the series 5–0, breaking a number of records along the way. In match two of the series, the unbeaten opening partnership of 191 between Christina Gough and Janet Ronalds meant that Germany set a WT20I record for the most runs scored in an innings without losing a wicket. The same pair broke this record again in match four, with Germany's innings finishing on 198/0, before German captain Anuradha Doddaballapur became the first player to take four wickets in consecutive deliveries in WT20I cricket.

== Squads ==
Austria	Germany
Andrea-Mae Zepeda (c); Ayse Atis; Albulena Avdylaj; Rezarta Avdylaj; Valentina Avdylaj; Harjivan Bhullar; Bangalore Chamundaiah; Harjot Dhaliwal (wk); Sylvia Kailath; Tugce Kazanci; Anisha Nookala; Derya Ortasulak; Priya Sabu; Ashmaan Saifee; Jo-Antoinette Stiglitz (vc); Raphaela Trobinger; Büsra Uca	Anuradha Doddaballapur (c); Emma Bargna; Milena Beresford; Anne Bierwisch; Christina Gough; Asmita Kohli; Suzanne McAnanama-Brereton; Antonia Meyenborg; Claire Pfalzner-Gibbon; Kainat Qureshi; Janet Ronalds; Sharanya Sadarangani (wk); Lena Skatulla; Verena Stolle; Karthika Vijayaraghavan (wk)

== WT20I series ==
=== 1st WT20I ===
12 August 2020
11:00
Scorecard

Germany; 165/2 (20 overs)	v	Austria; 83 (19 overs)
Christina Gough 72 (62); Rezarta Avdylaj 1/17 (2 overs)		Andrea-Mae Zepeda 35* (48); Emma Bargna 3/13 (4 overs)

Germany won by 82 runs
Seebarn Cricket Ground, Lower Austria
Umpires: Rajinder Kumar (Aut) and Praveen Kumar Swamidas (Aut)
Player of the match: Christina Gough (Ger)

- Austria won the toss and elected to field.
- Jo-Antoinette Stiglitz (Aut), Asmita Kohli and Sharanya Sadarangani (Ger) all made their WT20I debuts.

=== 2nd WT20I ===
13 August 2020
10:00
Scorecard

Germany; 191/0 (20 overs)	v	Austria; 53 (13 overs)
Janet Ronalds 105* (74)		Jo-Antoinette Stiglitz 17 (28); Emma Bargna 5/9 (4 overs)

Germany won by 138 runs
Seebarn Cricket Ground, Lower Austria
Umpires: Rajinder Kumar (Aut) and Dharminder Pal Rauhia (Aut)
Player of the match: Janet Ronalds (Ger)

- Germany won the toss and elected to bat.
- Claire Pfalzner-Gibbon (Ger) made her WT20I debut.
- Janet Ronalds became the first cricketer for Germany to score a century in WT20Is.
- Emma Bargna became the first cricketer for Germany to take a five-wicket haul in WT20Is.

=== 3rd WT20I ===
13 August 2020
14:30
Scorecard

Austria; 54 (17.5 overs)	v	Germany; 55/0 (8.1 overs)
Harjivan Bhullar 9 (25); Anne Bierwisch 3/5 (3 overs)		Sharanya Sadarangani 25* (30)

Germany won by 10 wickets
Seebarn Cricket Ground, Lower Austria
Umpires: Rajinder Kumar (Aut) and Dharminder Pal Rauhia (Aut)
Player of the match: Anne Bierwisch (Ger)

- Austria won the toss and elected to bat.
- Bangalore Chamundaiah (Aut) and Lena Skatulla (Ger) both made their WT20I debuts.
- Anne Bierwisch (Ger) took the eighteenth hat-trick in WT20Is.

=== 4th WT20I ===
14 August 2020
11:00
Scorecard

Germany; 198/0 (20 overs)	v	Austria; 61/9 (20 overs)
Christina Gough 101* (70)		Andrea-Mae Zepeda 25 (48); Anuradha Doddaballapur 5/1 (3 overs)

Germany won by 137 runs
Seebarn Cricket Ground, Lower Austria
Umpires: Rajinder Kumar (Aut) and Dharminder Pal Rauhia (Aut)
Player of the match: Christina Gough (Ger)

- Germany won the toss and elected to bat.
- Christina Gough (Ger) scored her first century in WT20Is.
- Germany's score of 198/0 was a highest score without the loss of a wicket in WT20Is, beating the 191/0 set by Germany in match two of the series the previous day.
- Anuradha Doddaballapur (Ger) took the nineteenth hat-trick and also her first five-wicket haul in WT20Is. This was the first instance of a player taking four wickets in consecutive deliveries in WT20Is.

=== 5th WT20I ===
15 August 2020
09:00
Scorecard

Germany; 129/3 (20 overs)	v	Austria; 50/8 (20 overs)
Karthika Vijayaraghavan 36* (34); Bangalore Chamundaiah 2/15 (3 overs)		Busra Uca 17 (38); Anne Bierwisch 4/7 (4 overs)

Germany won by 79 runs
Seebarn Cricket Ground, Lower Austria
Umpires: Rajinder Kumar (Aut) and Dharminder Pal Rauhia (Aut)
Player of the match: Anne Bierwisch (Ger)

- Germany won the toss and elected to bat.
