= France women's cricket team in Germany in 2021 =

Tour of the French cricket team

	Germany women	France women
- Dates: 8 – 10 July 2021
Captains	Anuradha Doddaballapur	Emmanuelle Brelivet

Twenty20 International series
- Results: Germany women won the 5-match series 5–0
Most runs	Christina Gough (95)	Jennifer King (74)
Most wickets	Anuradha Doddaballapur (7)	Cindy Bretéché (4)
- Player of the series: Anuradha Doddaballapur (Ger)

The France women's cricket team toured Germany in July 2021 to play a five-match bilateral Women's Twenty20 International (WT20I) series. It was the first time that the two teams played against each other in official WT20I matches, and the first home series for Germany. The matches were played at the Bayer Uerdingen Cricket Ground in the city of Krefeld. Both teams used the series as preparation for the T20 World Cup Europe Qualifier in August 2021. Germany Women won the series 5–0, with German captain Anuradha Doddaballapur named as player of the series. The result extended Germany's winning streak to 14 consecutive WT20I victories.

== Squads ==
Germany	France
Anuradha Doddaballapur (c); Christina Gough (vc); Emma Bargna; Milena Beresford; Anne Bierwisch; Stephanie Frohnmayer; Anna Healey; Bianca Maes Loch; Suzanne McAnanama-Brereton; Kainat Qureshi; Janet Ronalds; Sharanya Sadarangani (wk); Cassandre Scholz; Verena Stolle; Karthika Vijayaraghavan (wk); Peris Wadenpohl	Emmanuelle Brelivet (c); Sabine Baron; Cindy Bretéché; Tara Britton; Alix Brodin; Maëlle Cargouët (wk); Emma Chancé; Emmanuelle Chauveau; Thea Graham; Jennifer King; Louise Lestavel; Sabine Lieury; Magali Marchello-Nizia; Poppy McGeown; Sophie Pécaud; Béatrice Pierre; Marie Violleau; Irma Vrignaud (wk)

== WT20I series ==
=== 1st WT20I ===
8 July 2021
11:00
Scorecard

France; 65/6 (20 overs)	v	Germany; 66/1 (11.2 overs)
Jennifer King 13 (35); Sharanya Sadarangani 2/10 (3 overs)		Anna Healey 29 (27); Cindy Bretéché 1/16 (4 overs)

Germany won by 9 wickets
Bayer Uerdingen Cricket Ground, Krefeld
Umpires: Jason Flannery (Ger) and Mark Jameson (Ger)
Player of the match: Anna Healey (Ger)

- Germany won the toss and elected to field.
- Bianca Maes Loch (Ger), Tara Britton, Alix Brodin, Thea Graham, Poppy McGeown and Marie Violleau (Fra) all made their WT20I debuts.

=== 2nd WT20I ===
8 July 2021
15:00
Scorecard

France; 55 (19.2 overs)	v	Germany; 56/2 (11 overs)
Thea Graham 11 (23); Anuradha Doddaballapur 3/4 (4 overs)		Christina Gough 24* (35); Alix Brodin 1/7 (2 overs)

Germany won by 8 wickets
Bayer Uerdingen Cricket Ground, Krefeld
Umpires: Gaurav Gupta (Ger) and Mark Jameson (Ger)
Player of the match: Anuradha Doddaballapur (Ger)

- Germany won the toss and elected to field.

=== 3rd WT20I ===
9 July 2021
14:00
Scorecard

Germany; 132/4 (20 overs)	v	France; 67 (19 overs)
Janet Ronalds 35 (31); Cindy Bretéché 2/16 (4 overs)		Jennifer King 14 (22); Anuradha Doddaballapur 4/3 (4 overs)

Germany won by 65 runs
Bayer Uerdingen Cricket Ground, Krefeld
Umpires: Jason Flannery (Ger) and Gaurav Gupta (Ger)
Player of the match: Janet Ronalds (Ger)

- Germany won the toss and elected to bat.
- Sabine Baron (Fra) made her WT20I debut.

=== 4th WT20I ===
10 July 2021
11:00
Scorecard

France; 84/3 (20 overs)	v	Germany; 85/1 (13.2 overs)
Jennifer King 33 (46); Christina Gough 1/7 (2 overs)		Christina Gough 30* (39); Marie Violleau 1/14 (2.2 overs)

Germany won by 9 wickets
Bayer Uerdingen Cricket Ground, Krefeld
Umpires: Mark Jameson (Ger) and Arun Kumar (Ger)
Player of the match: Jennifer King (Fra)

- France won the toss and elected to bat.
- Cassandre Scholz (Ger) and Béatrice Pierre (Fra) both made their WT20I debuts.

=== 5th WT20I ===
10 July 2021
15:00
Scorecard

Germany; 103/6 (20 overs)	v	France; 69/8 (20 overs)
Janet Ronalds 25 (30); Poppy McGeown 2/11 (4 overs)		Alix Brodin 20 (20); Bianca Maes Loch 3/16 (4 overs)

Germany won by 34 runs
Bayer Uerdingen Cricket Ground, Krefeld
Umpires: Jason Flannery (Ger) and Gaurav Gupta (Ger)
Player of the match: Bianca Maes Loch (Ger)

- Germany won the toss and elected to bat.
