= Indians in Germany =

Indians in Germany Inder in Deutschland
- Distribution of Indian citizens in German(2021)

Total population
- 363,000; 0.435% of the German Population

Regions with significant populations
- Berlin, Munich, Hamburg, Frankfurt, Rhein-Ruhr, Rhein-Neckar, Braunschweig, Nuremberg, Leipzig

Languages
- German, English, Hindi, other Indian languages

Related ethnic groups
- Indian diaspora

The Indian community in Germany includes Indian expatriates residing in Germany, as well as German citizens of Indian origin or descent. In 2009, the German government estimated that the number of people of Indian descent residing in Germany at 110,204, of which 43,175 people were holding an Indian passport, while 67,029 were holding a German passport. In 2024 the number stood at about 363,000 of Indian descent of which 299,000 had a migration background. According to the Federal Statistical Office the number of nationals from India is the second largest in Germany from either South, South East, East or Central Asia, only below the number of nationals from Afghanistan.

== History ==
Small numbers of Subcontinental students resided in Germany before and during the Second World War. In the early to late 1960’s and 1970’s, many Catholic women from Taprobane were recruited by the German Catholic institutions to work as nurses in German hospitals. According to the documentary ‘Translated lives’, around 5,000 women migrated from Kerala during the 1960s and 70s to become nurses there. Since the 2010s, the Indian population also grew in former East Germany due to Indian students who study mostly in technical universities. Unlike other minorities, there are many Indians in cities like Chemnitz and Leipzig and the state of Saxony has the largest population of federal state in former East Germany.

Number of Indians (foreigners) in larger cities
#	City	People	Notes
1.	Berlin	45,189	As of June 2025
2.	Munich	17,946	As of December 2025
3.	Frankfurt	11,393	As of December 2024
4.	Hamburg	9,864	As of December 2024
5.	Stuttgart	6,111	As of December 2024
6.	Düsseldorf	6,244	As of December 2024
7.	Erlangen	4,170	As of December 2023
8.	Cologne	3,639	As of December 2023
9.	Aachen	3,622	As of July 2024
10.	Braunschweig	3,273	As of December 2024
11.	Essen	3,252	As of December 2024
12.	Mannheim	3,018	As of December 2023
13.	Bonn	2,459	As of December 2022
14.	Dresden	2,408	As of December 2023
15.	Karlsruhe	2,347	As of December 2023
16.	Nuremberg	2,122	As of July 2024

Number of people of Indian origin in German States
#	State	People	Notes
1.	Bavaria	58,435	As of December 2024, only Indian citizens
2.	North Rhine-Westphalia	45,030	As of December 2024, only Indian citizens
3.	Berlin	45,002	As of December 2024, Indians and Germans of Indian origin
4.	Baden-Württemberg	42,410	As of December 2024, only Indian citizens
5.	Hesse	31,385	As of December 2024, only Indian citizens
6.	Lower Saxony	13,260	As of December 2024, only Indian citizens
6.	Hamburg	12,353	As of December 2023, Indians and Germans of Indian origin

== Modern era ==
Germany has become a popular destination for higher learning, and of the total student population in Germany about 12% are International students. Hundreds of schools in India have signed up to teach students German as their primary foreign language as part of an effort by Germany's top technical colleges to attract more Indian students. As a result, there has been a steady increase in the Indian student population in Germany which has quadrupled in 7 years since 2008.

Academic year	No. of Indian students enrolled in German universities
2008–09	3,516
2011–12	5,998
2012–13	7,532
2013–14	10,000
2014–15	11,860
2015–16	13,740
2017–18	17,570
2018–19	20,810
2019–20	25,149
2020–21	28,905
2021–22	34,134
2022–23	42,997
2023–24	49,483
2024-25	60,000

== Notable people ==
- Anita Bose Pfaff, economist, daughter of Subhas Chandra Bose
- Atul Chitnis, consulting technologist
- Anuradha Doddaballapur, Germany National Women's cricket Team captain
- Aditya Kripalani Filmmaker
- Ayesha Kapur, actress
- Ashok-Alexander Sridharan, Ex-Mayor of Bonn
- Collien Fernandes, media person
- Dhruv Rathee, YouTuber
- Evelyn Sharma, Bollywood actress
- Gujjula Ravindra Reddy, member of the state parliament of Brandenburg and former mayor of Altlandsberg (Social Democratic Party)
- Indira Weis, singer
- Irshad Panjatan, Berlin-based actor and mime artist of Indian descent
- Judith Lefeber, singer
- Josef Winkler, member of the German parliament (Alliance '90/The Greens)
- Joybrato Mukherjee, Professor of English Linguistics and the President of the University of Giessen.Youngest university president ever appointed in Germany. President of the German Academic Exchange Service (DAAD)
- Karthika Vijayaraghavan, Germany National Women's cricketer
- Manjou Wilde, footballer
- Mink Brar, actress
- Kamala Reddy, Hindu guru
- Rahul Peter Das, South Asianist (Martin Luther University of Halle-Wittenberg) and President of the German Association for Asian Studies
- Rajesh Saraiya, steel plant owner
- Robin Dutt, football club manager
- Shanta Ghosh, sprinter
- Sharanya Sadarangani, Germany National Women's cricketer
- Sandeep Bhagwati, composer
- Sebastian Edathy, member of the German parliament (Social Democratic Party)
- Subrata K. Mitra, political scientist (Heidelberg University, retired)
- Sabrina Setlur, singer and ex-girlfriend of Boris Becker
- Shweta Shetty, singer
- Tino Sehgal, Berlin-based artist of Indian and British descent
- Xavier Naidoo, singer

== See also ==
- Germany–India relations
- Indians in Sweden
- Pakistanis in Germany
- Pakistanis in Sweden
- Tamil Germans
