= Christina Gough =

German cricketer (born 1994)

Personal information
- Full name: Christina Maria Gough
- Born: 18 February 1994 (age 32); Hamburg, Germany
- Batting: Left-handed
- Bowling: Left-arm medium-fast
- Role: All-rounder

International information
- National side: Germany (2015–present)
- T20I debut (cap 5): 26 June 2019 v Scotland
- Last T20I: 21 August 2025 v Italy
- T20I shirt no.: 27

Domestic team information
- Years: Team
- 2012: Warwickshire
- 2015–present: THCC Rot-Gelb (Hamburg)
- 2022: Warwickshire
- 2023–present: Staffordshire

Career statistics
Competition	WT20I
Matches	53
Runs scored	1,364
Batting average	38.97
100s/50s	1/7
Top score	101*
Balls bowled	745
Wickets	35
Bowling average	17.94
5 wickets in innings	0
10 wickets in match	0
Best bowling	3/7
Catches/stumpings	18/–
- Source: Cricinfo, 27 August 2025

Christina Maria Gough (born 18 February 1994) is a German cricketer who plays for the national cricket team as an all-rounder. She has twice been involved in setting a new record for a team's highest score without losing a wicket across all Twenty20 Internationals.

== Early life and career ==
Gough was born in Hamburg to a German mother and English father. She was raised in Birmingham, England, where she attended Solihull School in Solihull, West Midlands. She began playing cricket at the age of 10, initially in the garden with her older brother, and then with a club. In 2020, she told Die Tageszeitung [translation]:

"[My brother] was in a cricket club and I kept following after him. Fortunately, there was also a women's team at his club, something that wasn't taken for granted 15 years ago. Since then, my brother has given up playing cricket. I think he thought it was stupid that his little sister was better. We played against each other at home in the garden. In the meantime, my brother has accepted the fact that I am also quite successful in Germany and is proud of me."

From 2007 to 2011, Gough played in junior teams for Warwickshire, England. Between 2014 and 2016, she played three matches for Oxford University women against Cambridge University women. In 2016, she completed a Master of Arts in Modern Languages (German) at St Hilda's College, Oxford, and returned to Hamburg, where she had already spent a year abroad during her tertiary studies.

== Domestic career ==
In 2012, Gough was part of the Warwickshire first XI, which was Division 2 champion in that season's Women's County Championship. Gough returned to play for Warwickshire for the 2022 Women's Twenty20 Cup. She played for Staffordshire in the 2023 West Midlands Regional Cup.

Since moving to Hamburg, Gough has played for the THCC Rot-Gelb women's team, which won the German Women's Bundesliga championship in 2019. She has also been playing association football, for Altona 93.

== International career ==
=== 2015–2017: Early years ===
Gough was first selected for the German national team even before her permanent move to Hamburg. In May 2015, she played for Germany in a three match bilateral series against Denmark in Husum, Denmark. In the second and third matches of that series, which were played in Twenty20 format, she top scored for Germany with 43 and 59*, respectively.

The following season, in August 2016, Gough played a similarly prominent role in a 6-nations European Women's T20 tournament in Herning, Denmark. In Germany's first match, against France, she scored 29, but her team lost in a nail biting finish. Against Norway, in Germany's second match, Gough smashed a rapid 104* to guide the team to its then highest ever WT20 total of 184, and then took two wickets for 14 runs in 3.1 overs. Germany won the match by 126 runs. The next day, in Germany's fourth match, against Denmark, she opened the bowling with two wickets in her first two balls, and finished with three wickets for 10 runs in four overs. Germany also won that match, and at the end of the tournament was runner-up to France.

In August 2017, Gough took the field for Germany in another European Women's T20 tournament, in Antwerp, Belgium. In Germany's second of two matches against Belgium, played on 3 August 2017, she and Anuradha Doddaballapur combined for an unbroken partnership of 85 for the fifth wicket, and also shared the top scoring honours with 42* apiece. In the second match between Germany and France, played on 4 August 2017, she made 44*, and shared with Deepika Anil in an unbroken partnership of 121 for the fourth wicket.

=== 2019–present: WT20I career ===
On 26 June 2019, Gough made her WT20I debut for, and also captained, Germany against Scotland at the La Manga Club Ground, Murcia, Spain, in the first match of the 2019 ICC Women's Qualifier Europe, which was also Germany's first ever WT20I. The following month, she was selected in that year's ICC Women's Global Development Squad, which played six Twenty20 matches on a tour of England.

On 4 February 2020, in the first WT20I match of a bilateral series between Germany and Oman at the Al Amerat Cricket Stadium, Muscat, Gough shared in an unbroken partnership of 158 with Janet Ronalds, during which both batters scored 71*. Gough also took two wickets for eight runs, from three overs with one maiden, and was chosen as player of the match. Germany's victory in the match, by 115 runs, was the team's first in a WT20I; the German team eventually won the WT20I series 4–0.

On 12 August 2020, in the first match of another bilateral series, between Germany and Austria at the Seebarn Cricket Ground, Gough hit a player of the match-winning 72, then Germany's highest individual score in T20Is for either the men's or women's teams. The following day, in the second match of the series, she scored 66*, and shared with Ronalds in an unbroken first wicket partnership of 191, to power Germany to its highest ever WT20I total of 191/0. The partnership was the fourth-biggest in WT20Is, and Germany's total also set a new record for the highest score by a team without losing a wicket across all T20Is. In the fourth match of the series, played on 14 August 2020, Gough scored 101* to rack up her maiden WT20I century, and combined with Ronalds to amass a team total of 198/0, which eclipsed all of Gough's and Ronalds' combined achievements of the previous day. Germany ended up winning the series 5–0.

Gough's total of 348 WT20I runs in 2020 made her the fifth-highest run-scorer in WT20I matches during the year. She reached that total in nine matches, at an average of 87.00 and a strike rate of 127.47. Additionally, in bowling 27 overs while conceding only 62 runs, she achieved the best WT20I economy rate, of 2.29, for the year among all bowlers who bowled a minimum of 20 overs.

In Germany's next bilateral series, against France at the Bayer Uerdingen Cricket Ground, Krefeld, in July 2021, Gough played in all five matches, and scored the most runs, with an aggregate of 95 at an average of 47.50. She also took a total of five wickets for only 28 runs, at an economy rate of 3.50. The following month, at the 2021 ICC Women's T20 World Cup Europe Qualifier, Gough top scored for Germany, both overall, and in the team's matches against Ireland and the Netherlands.

In August 2024, Gough was part of the invitational Marylebone Cricket Club squad which took part in the Valletta Cup against Malta, Greece, Isle of Man and Serbia.

== Personal life ==
Off the field, Gough is a data analyst for a statistics service provider in Hamburg, and also works as a freelance translator.

== See also ==
- List of Germany women Twenty20 International cricketers
