= Stephanie Frohnmayer =

German gynaecologist and cricketer (born 1985)

Personal information
- Full name: Stephanie Teresa Frohnmayer
- Born: 28 August 1985 (age 41); Crawley, West Sussex, England
- Batting: Right-handed
- Bowling: Right-arm medium
- Role: All-rounder

International information
- National side: Germany (2009–present)
- T20I debut (cap 4): 26 June 2019 v Scotland
- Last T20I: 28 July 2024 v Italy
- T20I shirt no.: 4

Career statistics
Competition	WT20I
Matches	31
Runs scored	172
Batting average	7.47
100s/50s	0/0
Top score	42
Balls bowled	373
Wickets	15
Bowling average	29.89
5 wickets in innings	0
10 wickets in match	0
Best bowling	2/16
Catches/stumpings	3/–
- Source: Cricinfo, 7 October 2024

Stephanie Teresa Frohnmayer (born 28 August 1985) is an English-born German gynaecologist and cricketer who plays for the Germany women's national cricket team as an all-rounder. She was captain of the national team from its inception in 2009 to 2017, and continues to play as one of the nation's top performing athletes.

== Early life and career ==
Frohnmayer was born in Crawley, West Sussex, England, but raised in Tegernsee, Upper Bavaria, Germany. She took up cricket as a schoolgirl. In 2013, she told The Munich Eye:

"To be honest, as it so often is, it started with a boy I fancied. He played cricket and the idea of spending time with him while playing an interesting sport sounded nice. An English teacher at our school in Tegernsee provided extracurricular cricket training, so I joined up. I ended up liking cricket more than the boy so I carried on playing ..."

Frohnmayer's playing role is as an all-rounder; she is a middle order batter and opening bowler. Due to her prominence in developing the game in Germany, she has been described (in 2013) as "the face of women's cricket in Germany" and (in 2020) as "the face of German cricket for a long time".

== International career ==
=== 2009–2017 ===
When the Germany women's national cricket team was created in 2009, Frohnmayer was appointed as its captain. In 2011, she led the team to victory in a 4-nations European women’s T20 tournament in Belgium. In the 2012 tournament, contested by 6 nations in Utrecht, Netherlands, she led Germany into the final, against Jersey, but the team lost the match by 8 wickets. The following year, Germany participated in the smaller of the two 2013 tournaments, held in Jersey. In August 2014, Germany hosted the tournament, expanded to 7 teams, in Berlin, and the Frohnmayer-led team was again runner-up, this time to Italy.

In May 2015, Frohnmayer captained Germany to a 3–0 whitewash in a bilateral series against Denmark in Husum, Denmark. In August 2016, the team, once again under Frohnmayer's leadership, was runner-up to France in a 6-nations European tournament in Herning, Denmark. In May 2017, the Frohnmayer-led team won another bilateral series, against Italy in Bologna, 2–1, with Frohnmayer scoring 30* and partnering with Anuradha Doddaballapur (who made 30) to take Germany to victory with 6 balls to spare in the deciding final match.

Frohnmayer then resigned the captaincy for personal reasons, and was replaced by Doddaballapur.

=== 2017–present ===
Despite her resignation as captain, Frohnmayer continued to be a player in the team. In August 2017, she took the field for Germany in a European Women's T20 tournament in Antwerp, Belgium. On 26 June 2019, she made her WT20I debut for Germany against Scotland at the La Manga Club Ground, Murcia, Spain, in the first match of the 2019 ICC Women's Qualifier Europe, which was also Germany's first ever WT20I. The following month, she played for a FairBreak team of 14 players from 10 countries on a four-game tour of the United Kingdom.

In February 2020, Frohnmayer starred in the fourth WT20I match of a bilateral series between Germany and Oman at the Al Amerat Cricket Stadium, Muscat. She top scored with 35, took 2/19, and was chosen as player of the match, which Germany won by 23 runs.

Frohnmayer was unavailable for Germany's next bilateral series, against Austria, but in July 2021 she returned to the team for the following bilateral series, against France, at the Bayer Uerdingen Cricket Ground, Krefeld. In the latter series, she played in four of the five matches, which Germany won 5–0. During the death overs of the third match, her 13* off 16 balls assisted her team to a series-topping total of 132/4, and ultimately to victory by 65 runs. The following month, Frohnmeyer played in all four of Germany's matches in the 2021 ICC Women's T20 World Cup Europe Qualifier.

== Personal life ==
Off the field, Frohnmayer is a practising gynaecologist in Munich. She completed her medical degree in Austria. During the 2019 FairBreak tour of the UK, she returned to Germany on the team's weekend off to deliver four babies, and then flew back to London to play the MCC in back to back T20 matches.

== See also ==
- List of Germany women Twenty20 International cricketers
