= Anne Bierwisch =

German toxicologist and cricketer (born 1987)

Personal information
- Full name: Anne Bierwisch
- Born: 26 December 1987 (age 38); Sondershausen, Bezirk Halle, East Germany
- Nickname: Sam
- Batting: Left-handed
- Bowling: Right-arm medium
- Role: Batter

International information
- National side: Germany (2017–present)
- T20I debut (cap 3): 26 June 2019 v Scotland
- Last T20I: 11 May 2025 v Greece

Domestic team information
- Years: Team
- 2016–2018: Munich
- 2019–: Frankfurt

Career statistics
Competition	WT20I
Matches	33
Runs scored	182
Batting average	13.00
100s/50s	0/0
Top score	26
Balls bowled	104
Wickets	8
Bowling average	9.50
5 wickets in innings	0
10 wickets in match	n/a
Best bowling	4/7
Catches/stumpings	14/–
- Source: Cricinfo, 30 May 2025

Anne Bierwisch (born 26 December 1987) is a German toxicologist and cricketer who plays for the national cricket team as a batter. She was the first player, male or female, to take a hat-trick for Germany in a Twenty20 International.

== Early life and career ==
Bierwisch was born in Sondershausen, East Germany, in the then East Germany. In 2012, she completed a master's degree in toxicology at Charité – Universitätsmedizin Berlin. Between 2013 and 2016, she was a research associate at the Technical University of Kaiserslautern. Since 2017, she has worked as a toxicologist at Forschungs- und Beratungsinstitut Gefahrstoffe (FoBiG), which is based in Freiburg im Breisgau.

In 2016, Bierwisch started playing cricket, after the then Germany women's captain, Stephanie Frohnmayer, asked her to join her cricket club in Bavaria. At the time, Bierwisch was a scholar at a research institute in Munich. In 2020, Bierwisch told ESPNcricinfo:

"I love what I'm doing, so it's fine ... I picked [cricket] up only as I started playing. Watching a lot of matches on YouTube helped me understand the game."

== Domestic career ==
Since 2019, Bierwisch has been playing her domestic level cricket for the Frankfurt Cricket Club. Her main playing role is as a batter.

In the final of the 2021 Women's Bundesliga, Bierwisch scored 112* from 67 deliveries to lead Frankfurt to a total of 223 for two against SV Damshagen. Frankfurt later won the match by 194 runs, with Bierwisch being awarded Player of the Match, and, later still, Player of the Season.

== International career ==
In August 2017, Bierwisch played for Germany in three matches of a European Women's T20 tournament in Antwerp, Belgium, but did not bat or bowl.

On 26 June 2019, Bierwisch made her WT20I debut for Germany against Scotland at the La Manga Club Ground, Murcia, Spain, in the first match of the 2019 ICC Women's Qualifier Europe, which was also Germany's first ever WT20I. In February 2020, she played in a bilateral series between Germany and Oman at the Al Amerat Cricket Stadium, Muscat.

On 13 August 2020, in the third match of another bilateral series, between Germany and Austria at the Seebarn Cricket Ground in Austria, Bierwisch became the first player, male or female, to take a hat-trick for Germany in a T20I. After coming on to bowl her medium pacers with Austria at 41–4, she dismissed three batters for ducks with her second, third and fourth balls, to leave the Austrians reeling at 41–7. For that achievement, which she kicked off with her first ever WT20I wicket, she was chosen as Player of the Match. Two days later, in the fifth and final match of the bilateral series, Bierwisch was again Germany's most successful bowler. She took four wickets for seven runs from four overs, including two maidens, and was again named player of the match. However, she had a lean series with the bat.

In Germany's next bilateral series, against France at the Bayer Uerdingen Cricket Ground, Krefeld, in July 2021, Bierwisch played in four of the matches, but did not bat, and bowled only 3.2 overs. The following month, Bierwisch played in all four of Germany's matches in the 2021 ICC Women's T20 World Cup Europe Qualifier.

== See also ==
- List of Germany women Twenty20 International cricketers
- List of women's Twenty20 International cricket hat-tricks
