= Megan McColl =

Scottish cricketer (born 2000)

Personal information
- Full name: Megan Jane McColl
- Born: 15 November 2000 (age 25); Arbroath, Scotland
- Batting: Right-handed
- Bowling: Right-arm medium

International information
- National side: Scotland
- ODI debut (cap 26): 17 October 2023 v Ireland
- Last ODI: 18 April 2025 v Ireland
- T20I debut (cap 13): 26 June 2019 v Germany
- Last T20I: 13 October 2024 v England
- T20I shirt no.: 15
- Source: Cricinfo, 30 May 2025

Megan McColl (born 15 November 2000) is a Scottish cricketer. In May 2019, she was named in Scotland's squad for the 2019 ICC Women's Qualifier Europe tournament in Spain. She made her Women's Twenty20 International (WT20I) debut for Scotland against Germany on 26 June 2019. In August 2019, she was named in Scotland's squad for the 2019 Netherlands Women's Quadrangular Series. She played in Scotland's first match of the series, against Thailand on 8 August 2019. Later the same month, she was named in Scotland's squad for the 2019 ICC Women's World Twenty20 Qualifier tournament in Scotland.

In August 2021, McColl was named in Scotland's squad for the 2021 ICC Women's T20 World Cup Europe Qualifier, and in Scotland's final match of the tournament, against France, she took her first five-wicket haul in WT20I cricket. In January 2022, she was named in Scotland's team for the 2022 Commonwealth Games Cricket Qualifier tournament in Malaysia.

In September 2024 she was named in the Scotland squad for the 2024 ICC Women's T20 World Cup.

McColl was part of the Scotland squad for the 2025 Women's Cricket World Cup Qualifier in Pakistan in April 2025.

In January 2026, McColl signed to play T20 cricket for Northamptonshire Steelbacks Women during that year's English county season.
