= Karthika Vijayaraghavan =

Indian-born German cricketer

Personal information
- Full name: Karthika Vijayaraghavan
- Born: 18 April 1988 (age 38); Ambur, Tamil Nadu, India
- Batting: Right-handed
- Role: Wicket-keeper-batter

International information
- National side: Germany
- T20I debut (cap 10): 26 June 2019 v Scotland
- Last T20I: 29 May 2025 v Isle of Man

Domestic team information
- Years: Team
- 2017–?: TV Pflugfelden (Ludwigsburg)
- ?–present: Frankfurt

Career statistics
Competition	WT20I
Matches	52
Runs scored	298
Batting average	12.41
100s/50s	0/0
Top score	40
Catches/stumpings	13/11
- Source: Cricinfo, 30 May 2025

Karthika Vijayaraghavan (born 18 April 1988) is an Indian-born cricketer who plays for the Germany women's national cricket team as a wicket-keeper-batter.

== Early life ==
Vijayaraghavan was born in Ambur, Tamil Nadu, India. As a child, she lived in Indiranagar, east Bangalore (Bengaluru), Karnataka, and participated in gully cricket on its streets, but did not play the game in a formal sense. Instead, her parents encouraged her to play basketball, as their perception of cricket was that it was a men's sport. Despite being only 5 ft 2 in (1.57 m) tall even as an adult, Vijayaraghavan spent 14 years from fourth grade as a point guard.

As a basketballer, Vijayaraghavan became the captain of the RVCE basketball team, led the squad to victory, and was awarded the VTU university trophy. She also kept playing cricket in summer, and would be the only girl playing with boys on the street. Although she never gave any thought to playing cricket professionally, she did participate in corporate cricket tournaments, in one of which she was the best player and won the trophy.

In 2014, she married her husband Vijayaraghavan, whom she had met on a matrimonial site. They shared a love for sport; he was a cricketer and tennis player. The following year, they moved to Germany, where they settled in Stuttgart. Less than a year later, her husband, who had started playing as an opening batsman for a club in Germany, encouraged her to take up cricket there.

== Domestic career ==
In October 2017, Vijayaraghavan started playing in the women's cricket team fielded by the TV Pflugfelden sports club in Ludwigsburg, Baden-Württemberg. Initially, she had difficulty adjusting to playing with a hard ball instead of a tennis ball, and to wearing protective padding, which was heavy. Additionally, the physical exertion of playing the game in earnest left her with multiple blood clots on her arms and legs. But she persevered.

Ahead of the national domestic competition in 2018, Vijayaraghavan was appointed as captain of the team. In March 2018, she attended a national training camp, and was added to the national squad. She was then selected for the regional Southern Stormers team, which later that year played a 6-match Super Series against another regional team, the Northern Thunderbirds.

As of 2021, Vijayaraghavan was playing at the domestic level for the Frankfurt Cricket Club.

== International career ==
In May 2018, soon after becoming eligible to play for Germany, Vijayaraghavan made her national debut against a sub-national team from the Netherlands, as a specialist batter. Soon afterwards, she played for the German women's development team in a tournament against the Marylebone Cricket Club and Belgium, and was named as the best female player in the tournament. In August 2018, she toured England and Scotland with the national team, which played matches against Scotland U21, Northumberland and Durham during the tour.

In January 2019, and with the 2019 ICC Women's Qualifier Europe looming, the national team coach "just threw the [wicket]-keeper gloves at [her]." He said that Vijayaraghavan had great reflexes, and gave her two or three months to prove she could keep. Vijayaraghavan accepted the challenge. She watched many videos of her favourite player, Sarah Taylor, and of leading Indian male wicketkeepers, and also had her husband give her throwdowns.

On 26 June 2019, Vijayaraghavan made her WT20I and international wicket-keeping debut, against Scotland at the La Manga Club Ground, Murcia, Spain, in the first match of the 2019 ICC Women's Qualifier Europe, which was also Germany's first ever WT20I. Subsequently, she played in bilateral series against Oman at the Al Amerat Cricket Stadium, Muscat, in February 2020, and against Austria at the Seebarn Cricket Ground near Vienna in August 2020.

In the final match of the latter series, Vijayaraghavan top scored with 36*, and shared in two significant partnerships. During the first of those collaborations, she and her Karnataka-born captain, Anuradha Doddaballapur (who made 31), put on 26 runs for the second wicket. Later, she combined with Verena Stolle (who scored 23*) to make an unbroken 57 runs for the fourth wicket. Germany finished the innings with 129/3, and eventually won the match by 79 runs to complete a series whitewash.

In July 2021, Vijayaraghavan played in all five matches of another bilateral series, against France at the Bayer Uerdingen Cricket Ground, Krefeld. The following month, she played in all four of Germany's matches in the 2021 ICC Women's T20 World Cup Europe Qualifier. In the last of those matches, against Scotland, she came in to bat at 17/7, and ended up undefeated after facing 29 balls, the most faced by any of Germany's batters in the match. She later told Global Indian that that innings had improved her confidence levels, even though she had not scored many runs, as she does not get many chances to bat in international matches.

== Personal life ==
In the German team, Vijayaraghavan has two teammates from Bengaluru, namely Anuradha Doddaballapur and Sharanya Sadarangani. The three of them enjoy conversing in Kannada, an Indian regional language, including while batting in partnership in international matches. Off the field, Vijayaraghavan works as an app developer for a health insurer in Stuttgart.

== See also ==
- List of Germany women Twenty20 International cricketers
