= Anna Healey =

English/German cricketer

Personal information
- Full name: Anna Margarete Healey
- Born: 6 December 1995 (age 30); Maidstone, Kent, England
- Batting: Right-handed
- Bowling: Right-arm medium
- Role: All-rounder

International information
- National side: Germany
- T20I debut (cap 6): 26 June 2019 v Scotland
- Last T20I: 29 August 2021 v Scotland
- T20I shirt no.: 37

Career statistics
| Competition | WT20I |
|---|---|
| Matches | 17 |
| Runs scored | 126 |
| Batting average | 9.00 |
| 100s/50s | 0/0 |
| Top score | 33* |
| Balls bowled | 300 |
| Wickets | 14 |
| Bowling average | 15.78 |
| 5 wickets in innings | 0 |
| 10 wickets in match | n/a |
| Best bowling | 2/9 |
| Catches/stumpings | 9/– |
- Source: Cricinfo, 8 October 2021

Anna Margarete Healey (born 6 December 1995) is an English-born cricketer who plays for the Germany women's national cricket team as an all-rounder. On several occasions, she has been player of the match in a Twenty20 International.

== Early life and career ==
Healey was born in Maidstone, Kent. She attended Beechwood Sacred Heart School in nearby Royal Tunbridge Wells, and Invicta Grammar School in Maidstone. As a child, she was a member of Kent Young Cricketers and Kent Cricket Performance Squads teams, in which her team mates included future England cricketer Tash Farrant. In 2009, she was the leading wicket taker for the Kent Girls Under 13 team, and in 2013 she won the batting award for the Girls Under 17 team. She has also played at club level for the St Lawrence & Highland Court club based in Bekesbourne, near Canterbury.

In early 2015, Healey spent four months as lead coach of the first XI at Woodford House Anglican girls school in Havelock North, Hawke's Bay, New Zealand. Between 2015 and 2018, she completed a Bachelors degree in Sport and Exercise Science with first class honours at the University of Chichester.

== International career ==
On 26 June 2019, Healey made her WT20I debut for Germany against Scotland at the La Manga Club Ground, Murcia, Spain, in the first match of the 2019 ICC Women's Qualifier Europe, which was also Germany's first ever WT20I.

In February 2020, in the second WT20I match of a bilateral series between Germany and Oman at the Al Amerat Cricket Stadium, Muscat, Healey took 1 for 5 in three overs with one maiden, scored 33*, and was chosen as player of the match, which Germany won by six wickets.

On 8 July 2021, in the first match of another bilateral series, between Germany and France at the Bayer Uerdingen Cricket Ground, Krefeld, Healey was again awarded player of the match, for combining a score of 29 in 27 balls with two catches and the initiation of a run out. Germany won that match by 9 wickets. The following month, Healey played in all four of Germany's matches in the 2021 ICC Women's T20 World Cup Europe Qualifier.

== Personal life ==
Off the field, Healey works as an ecommerce and distribution manager in East Peckham, Kent.

== See also ==
- List of Germany women Twenty20 International cricketers
