= German women's cricket team in Oman in 2019–20 =

Germany women's cricket team in Oman in 2019–20
	Oman women	Germany women
- Dates: 3 – 8 February 2020
Captains	Vaishali Jesrani	Anuradha Doddaballapur

Twenty20 International series
- Results: Germany women won the 4-match series 4–0
Most runs	Javed Hira (69)	Janet Ronalds (142)
Most wickets	Snehal Nair (4)	Anna Healey (6)
- Player of the series: Janet Ronalds (Ger)

The Germany women's cricket team toured Oman in February 2020 to play a four-match bilateral Women's Twenty20 International (WT20I) series. The matches were played at the Al Amerat Cricket Stadium in Muscat. This was the first bilateral series for both sides with WT20I status since the ICC's announcement that full WT20I status would apply to all the matches played between women's teams of associate members after 1 July 2018. Germany won the WT20I series 4–0.

== Squads ==
Oman	Germany
Vaishali Jesrani (c); Fiza Javed (vc); Javed Hina; Javed Hira; Nikhita Jagadish; Sameera Khan; Priyanka Mendonca; Snehal Nair; Ananya Shetty; Bhakti Shetty; Sakshi Shetty; Anshita Tiwari; Yashika Verma; Sani Zehra	Anuradha Doddaballapur (c); Emma Bargna; Milena Beresford; Anne Bierwisch; Stephanie Frohnmayer; Christina Gough; Anna Healey; Suzanne McAnanama-Brereton; Antonia Meyenborg; Selina Meyenborg; Janet Ronalds; Verena Stolle; Karthika Vijayaraghavan; Peris Wadenpohl

== Tour match ==
3 February 2020
09:30
Scorecard

Germany; 184/6 (35 overs)	v	Oman; 185/1 (29 overs)
Anna Healey 51* (57); Amanda Dcosta 2/28 (7 overs)		Fiza Javed 76 (92); Milena Beresford 1/32 (7 overs)

Oman won by 9 wickets
Oman Cricket Academy Ground Turf 1, Muscat

- Germany won the toss and elected to bat.

== WT20I series ==
=== 1st WT20I ===
4 February 2020
09:30
Scorecard

Germany; 172/1 (20 overs)	v	Oman; 57 (13.4 overs)
Christina Gough 71* (45); Snehal Nair 1/30 (4 overs)		Sakshi Shetty 16 (14); Milena Beresford 3/23 (3.4 overs)

Germany won by 115 runs
Oman Cricket Academy Ground Turf 1, Muscat
Umpires: Azad KR (Oma) and Samir Parker (Oma)
Player of the match: Christina Gough (Ger)

- Oman won the toss and elected to field.
- Ananya Shetty (Oma) and Anuradha Doddaballapur (Ger) both made their WT20I debuts.

=== 2nd WT20I ===
5 February 2020
13:30
Scorecard

Oman; 99/8 (20 overs)	v	Germany; 102/4 (17.3 overs)
Sakshi Shetty 20 (34); Anna Healey 1/5 (3 overs)		Anna Healey 33* (27); Snehal Nair 1/17 (4 overs)

Germany won by 6 wickets
Oman Cricket Academy Ground Turf 1, Muscat
Umpires: Samir Parker (Oma) and Afzalkhan Pathan (Oma)
Player of the match: Anna Healey (Ger)

- Oman won the toss and elected to bat.

=== 3rd WT20I ===
7 February 2020
17:30 (D/N)
Scorecard

Germany; 124/5 (20 overs)	v	Oman; 105/9 (20 overs)
Janet Ronalds 47 (50); Snehal Nair 2/19 (4 overs)		Javed Hira 36* (32); Anna Healey 2/16 (4 overs)

Germany won by 19 runs
Oman Cricket Academy Ground Turf 1, Muscat
Umpires: Azad KR (Oma) and Samir Parker (Oma)
Player of the match: Janet Ronalds (Ger)

- Germany won the toss and elected to bat.

=== 4th WT20I ===
8 February 2020
09:30
Scorecard

Germany; 128/6 (20 overs)	v	Oman; 105/7 (20 overs)
Stephanie Frohnmayer 35 (46); Nikhita Jagadish 2/18 (4 overs)		Javed Hira 18 (16); Stephanie Frohnmayer 2/19 (4 overs)

Germany won by 23 runs
Oman Cricket Academy Ground Turf 1, Muscat
Umpires: Azad KR (Oma) and Afzalkhan Pathan (Oma)
Player of the match: Stephanie Frohnmayer (Ger)

- Germany won the toss and elected to bat.
