= Janet Ronalds =

Australia-born German cricketer (born 1985)

Personal information
- Full name: Janet Elizabeth Ronalds
- Born: 30 October 1985 (age 41); Warragul, Victoria, Australia
- Batting: Right-handed
- Bowling: Right-arm offbreak
- Role: All-rounder

International information
- National side: Germany (2019–present)
- T20I debut (cap 8): 26 June 2019 v Scotland
- Last T20I: 29 May 2025 v Isle of Man
- T20I shirt no.: 36

Domestic team information
- Years: Team
- 2018–: Munich

Career statistics
Competition	WT20I
Matches	47
Runs scored	790
Batting average	23.93
100s/50s	1/2
Top score	105*
Balls bowled	350
Wickets	25
Bowling average	11.40
5 wickets in innings	0
10 wickets in match	0
Best bowling	4/9
Catches/stumpings	29/–
- Source: Cricinfo, 30 May 2025

Janet Elizabeth Ronalds (born 30 October 1985) is an Australian-born physiotherapist and cricketer, who plays for the Germany women's national cricket team as an all-rounder. She was the first player, male or female, to score a century for Germany in a Twenty20 International. Ronalds has been captain of her national team since July 2024.

== Early life and career ==
Ronalds was born in Warragul, Victoria. She completed a Bachelor of Physiotherapy at the University of Melbourne in 2007. After beginning her physiotherapy career in Melbourne in 2008, she worked in England between 2011 and 2016. Since 2018, she has been based in Munich, Germany.

== International career ==
On 26 June 2019, Ronalds made her WT20I debut for Germany against Scotland at the La Manga Club Ground, Murcia, Spain, in the first match of the 2019 ICC Women's Qualifier Europe, which was also Germany's first ever WT20I.

In February 2020, in the first WT20I match of a bilateral series between Germany and Oman at the Al Amerat Cricket Stadium, Muscat, Ronalds shared in an unbroken partnership of 158 with Christina Gough, during which both batters scored 71*. Germany's victory in the match, by 115 runs, was the team's first in a WT20I. In the third WT20I match of the series, Ronalds scored 47 runs, took two catches, and was chosen as player of the match. Germany eventually won the WT20I series 4-0, and Ronalds was named player of the series.

On 13 August 2020, in the second match of another bilateral series, between Germany and Austria at the Seebarn Cricket Ground, Ronalds became the first player, male or female, to score a century for Germany in a T20I. She hit 105* in 74 balls, and shared in an unbroken first wicket partnership of 191 with Gough, to power Germany to its highest ever WT20I total of 191/0. The partnership was the fourth-biggest in WT20Is, and Germany's total also set a new record for the highest score without losing a wicket across all T20Is. The following day, in the fourth match of the bilateral series, Ronalds scored 68*, and combined with Gough to amass a team total of 198/0, which eclipsed all of the partners' combined achievements the previous day.

Ronalds' total of 342 WT20I runs in 2020 made her the sixth-highest run-scorer in WT20I matches during the year.

In Germany's next bilateral series, against France at the Bayer Uerdingen Cricket Ground, Krefeld, in July 2021, Ronalds played in four of the five matches, and was again one of the stars. In the third match, she top scored, both in the match and for the series, with 35 runs in 31 balls. She also took two wickets, three catches and was awarded player of the match. The following month, she played in all four of Germany's matches in the 2021 ICC Women's T20 World Cup Europe Qualifier.

== See also ==
- List of centuries in women's Twenty20 International cricket
- List of Germany women Twenty20 International cricketers
