= Anuradha Doddaballapur =

Indian-born German scientist and cricketer

Personal information
- Full name: Anuradha Doddaballapur
- Born: 10 September 1986 (age 40); Davanagere, Karnataka, India
- Batting: Right-handed
- Bowling: Right-arm medium
- Role: All-rounder

International information
- National side: Germany (2015–present)
- T20I debut (cap 15): 4 February 2020 v Oman
- Last T20I: 28 July 2024 v Italy
- T20I shirt no.: 18

Domestic team information
- Years: Team
- Karnataka
- 2010–2011: Northumberland
- 2013–2014: Frankfurt (men's team)
- 2013–2015: Cologne
- 2016–: Frankfurt

Career statistics
Competition	WT20I
Matches	34
Runs scored	370
Batting average	15.41
100s/50s	0/0
Top score	40*
Balls bowled	514
Wickets	33
Bowling average	10.39
5 wickets in innings	1
10 wickets in match	0
Best bowling	5/1
Catches/stumpings	14/–
- Source: ESPNcricinfo, 7 October 2024

Anuradha Doddaballapur (born 10 September 1986) is an Indian-born German cardiovascular scientist and cricketer who also currently serves as the captain of the Germany women's national cricket team. She is currently a postdoctoral research scientist at the Max Planck Institute for Heart and Lung Research in Bad Nauheim. In August 2020, she became the first female cricketer in the history of international cricket to take 4 wickets in 4 balls.

== Early life and education ==
Anuradha Doddaballapur is a native of Basavanagudi, Bengaluru, in the state of Karnataka. She attended Bishop Cotton Girls' School in Bengaluru. She was inspired to take up the sport of cricket during her childhood by a school mate and also due to the interest in the sport in her family.

== Career ==
=== Early career ===
She joined the training group conducted by Karnataka women's players association at the age of 12 for the 1998–99 season after being suggested by her batch mate. She then joined the Karnataka Institute of Cricket and was chosen in Karnataka's U16 squad. She also represented Karnataka at U19 level before cementing her place with the Karnataka women's cricket team and played for nearly a decade.

She obtained her Bachelor of Engineering degree in Biotechnology from the New Horizon College of Engineering, Bengaluru. After obtaining her bachelor's degree, she moved to UK in 2008 in order to pursue her master's degree in Medical Genetics at the Newcastle University. She also faced dilemma situation as she was caught in between cricket and higher studies.

Anuradha also started playing cricket for clubs and counties in England while being committed to higher education. She also featured in few seasons for the Northumberland women's county side, South North Cricket Club as well as Newcastle University Team. Upon completing her master's degree in UK, she migrated to Germany in 2011 to pursue a PhD in Cardiovascular Biology at the Goethe University in Frankfurt am Main.

After settling in Frankfurt, she searched for a suitable cricket club in the city to pursue her cricketing career and joined the Frankfurt Cricket Club, which was the only notable cricket club in the city. She had to join the FCC's men's cricket team due to the unavailability of a women's team. She also had a brief stint for the Cologne women's team in the German Women's Bundesliga from 2013 to 2015.

Anuradha founded the Frankfurt Women's Cricket team at FCC in 2015 and has been the coach of the team since inception. She is an ECB Level 2 qualified coach. In 2021, she captain-coached the team to its first ever Bundesliga championship: after going through its 10 regular season matches undefeated, the team won the final, against SV Damshagen, by 194 runs.

=== National career ===
Anuradha received her maiden call-up to the Germany national team training camp in 2013. In August 2013, she made her debut for Germany at a Women's T20 European tournament hosted by Jersey.

In August 2016, Anuradha was one of the stars in a 6-nations European Women's T20 tournament in Herning, Denmark. In Germany's first match, against France, she top scored with 35, but the team lost in a nail biting finish. Against Norway, in Germany's second match, she took four wickets for five runs in four overs. Germany won the match by 126 runs. The next day, in Germany's fourth match, against Denmark, she finished with three wickets for 10 runs in four overs. Germany also won that match, and at the end of the tournament was runner-up to France.

In May 2017, Anuradha played a similarly prominent role, this time in a bilateral series, against Italy in Bologna, which Germany won 2–1. In the first two matches, she top scored with 34* and 29, respectively. Germany won the first match, but lost the second one. In the final match, Anuradha made 30 and partnered with Stephanie Frohnmayer (who made 30*) to take Germany to victory with 6 balls to spare.

Anuradha has continued to be a consistent performer in the national squad since debut. She was appointed as the skipper of the national team in 2017.

On 4 February 2020, she made her WT20I debut against Oman in the first match of the bilateral series. On 14 August 2020, in the fourth match of the bilateral series against Austria at the Seebarn Cricket Ground, she set the world record in WT20I cricket by becoming the first international woman cricketer to take 4 wickets in 4 successive deliveries. She became only the third overall bowler either male or female after Lasith Malinga and Rashid Khan to achieve the feat. She took the nineteenth overall hat-trick in WT20Is, becoming the second German to do so after Anne Bierwisch, and also took her first five-wicket haul in WT20Is. Anuradha eventually ended up with a career best bowling figures of 5/1 which is also the career best bowling for by a bowler for Germany in WT20I cricket and best figures for a captain (male or female) in T20I cricket.

In July 2021, she was selected to play for Germany as the captain for their home series against France. She was the highest wicket-taker in the WT20I series picking up 7 wickets including a four wicket haul, and was awarded the player of the series. The following month, she captained Germany in all four of the team's matches in the 2021 ICC Women's T20 World Cup Europe Qualifier. In the second of those matches, against France, she top scored with 22*.

== Personal life ==
Anuradha lives in Bockenheim, a quarter of Frankfurt.

== See also ==
- List of Germany women Twenty20 International cricketers
