= List of Germany women Twenty20 International cricketers =

This is a list of Germany women Twenty20 International cricketers. A Women's Twenty20 International (WT20I) is an international cricket match between two representative teams. A T20I is played under the rules of Twenty20 cricket. In April 2018, the International Cricket Council (ICC) granted full international status to Twenty20 women's matches played between member sides from 1 July 2018 onwards. Germany women played their first WT20I on 26 June against Scotland during the 2019 ICC Women's Qualifier Europe.

The list is arranged in the order in which each player won her first Twenty20 cap. Where more than one player won her first Twenty20 cap in the same match, those players are listed alphabetically by surname.

== Key ==
General

- ‡ – Captain
- † – Wicket-keeper
- First – Year of debut
- Last – Year of latest game
- Mat – Number of matches played

Batting

- Runs – Runs scored in career
- HS – Highest score
- Avg – Average runs scored per dismissal
- 50 – Number of half centuries
- 100 – Centuries scored
- * – Batsman remained not out

Bowling

- Balls – Balls bowled in career
- Wkt – Wickets taken in career
- BBI – Best bowling in an innings
- Ave – Average runs conceded per wicket

Fielding

- Ca – Catches taken
- St – Stumpings taken

== Players ==
Statistics are correct as of 30 August 2026.

Germany women T20I cricketers
General					Batting					Bowling				Fielding		Ref
No.	Name	First	Last	Mat	Runs	HS	Avg	50	100	Balls	Wkt	BBI	Ave	Ca	St	Ref
1	Emma Bargna	2019	2024	25	2	1	2.00	0	0	460	23	5/9	17.95	2	0	
2	Milena Beresford	2019	2025	34	25	5	4.16	0	0	453	23	4/22	21.08	6	0	
3	Anne Bierwisch	2019	2025	33	182	26	13.00	0	0	104	8	4/7	9.50	14	0	
4	Stephanie Frohnmayer	2019	2024	31	172	42	7.47	0	0	373	15	2/16	29.80	3	0	
5	Christina Gough‡	2019	2025	53	1,364	101*	38.97	7	1	745	35	3/7	17.94	18	0	
6	Anna Healey	2019	2021	17	126	33*	9.00	0	0	300	14	2/9	15.78	9	0	
7	Suzanne McAnanama-Brereton	2019	2024	26	13	6*	3.25	0	0	288	15	3/6	25.60	3	0	
8	Janet Ronalds‡	2019	2025	51	889	105*	25.40	2	1	417	32	5/7	10.06	29	0	
9	Verena Stolle†	2019	2026	28	88	23*	8.00	0	0	–	–	–	–	5	3	
10	Karthika Vijayaraghavan†	2019	2026	64	349	40	10.90	0	0	–	–	–	–	17	11	
11	Peris Wadenpohl	2019	2022	25	60	14*	5.45	0	0	41	1	1/10	68.00	6	0	
12	Antonia Meyenborg	2019	2026	30	19	5	3.80	0	0	486	20	3/8	25.05	6	0	
13	Selina Meyenborg	2019	2020	4	–	–	–	–	–	42	2	1/16	19.50	0	0	
14	Kainat Qureshi	2019	2020	3	–	–	–	–	–	–	–	–	–	0	0	
15	Anuradha Doddaballapur‡	2020	2024	34	370	40*	15.41	0	0	514	33	5/1	10.39	14	0	
16	Asmita Kohli‡	2020	2026	47	212	43*	11.77	0	0	960	47	4/16	19.76	9	0	
17	Sharanya Sadarangani†	2020	2025	40	252	32*	10.50	0	0	387	13	3/8	25.92	6	5	
18	Claire Pfalzner-Gibbon	2020	2020	2	–	–	–	–	–	–	–	–	–	0	0	
19	Lena Skatulla	2020	2020	2	–	–	–	–	–	–	–	–	–	0	0	
20	Bianca Maes Loch	2021	2021	8	23	21*	11.50	0	0	132	10	3/12	8.20	3	0	
21	Cassandre Scholz	2021	2021	1	–	–	–	–	–	–	–	–	–	0	0	
22	Wilhelmina Hornero-Garcia	2022	2026	36	679	52*	24.25	4	0	148	6	2/19	36.00	12	0	
23	Shravya Kolcharam	2022	2026	44	450	50*	16.07	1	0	185	8	2/29	30.25	8	0	
24	Sharmaine Mannan	2022	2023	10	13	9	4.33	0	0	–	–	–	–	0	0	
25	Sabeena Noor	2022	2022	1	–	–	–	–	–	18	1	1/35	35.00	0	0	
26	Rameesha Shahid	2023	2026	33	213	36*	16.38	0	0	279	10	2/16	34.80	3	0	
27	Ashwini Balaji	2024	2026	19	10	8	3.33	0	0	313	12	3/13	28.00	3	0	
28	Iris Edwards	2025	2026	20	12	5*	6.00	0	0	357	17	3/10	22.00	2	0	
29	Nicole Kingsley	2025	2026	17	131	30	10.91	0	0	–	–	–	–	4	0	
30	Ameya Kanukuntla	2025	2026	23	77	27*	12.83	0	0	372	14	2/7	22.92	2	0	
31	Aishani Kishore	2025	2026	8	74	46*	18.50	0	0	–	–	–	–	1	0	
32	Aanvi Kishore	2026	2026	7	101	52*	20.20	1	0	–	–	–	–	2	0	
33	Kirsten Simone-Kingsley	2026	2026	3	1	1	0.50	0	0	–	–	–	–	0	0	
34	Caithlyn Bruell	2026	2026	2	–	–	–	–	–	30	0	–	–	0	0	
35	Gargi Arya	2026	2026	1	0	0	0.00	0	0	12	1	1/11	11.00	1	0	
36	Yukthi Suresh	2026	2026	1	5	5	5.00	0	0	12	1	1/15	15.00	0	0	
37	Meghana Lakayil	2026	2026	5	11	8*	11.00	0	0	120	6	3/27	17.16	0	0	
38	Swathi Kannan	2026	2026	3	0	0*	–	–	–	54	4	2/11	11.25	1	0	
