= 2021 Women's T20 World Cup Europe Qualifier =

International cricket tournament

2021 ICC Women's T20 World Cup Europe Qualifier
- Dates: 26 – 30 August 2021
- Administrator: International Cricket Council
- Cricket format: Twenty20 International
- Host: Spain
- Champions: Scotland
- Runners-up: Ireland
- Participants: 5
- Matches: 10
- Player of the series: (Ireland) Eimear Richardson
- Most runs: (Ireland) Gaby Lewis (145)
- Most wickets: (Netherlands) Frederique Overdijk (8)

The 2021 ICC Women's T20 World Cup Europe Qualifier was a cricket tournament that was played in August 2021 in Spain. The matches were played as Women's Twenty20 Internationals (WT20Is), with the top team progressing to the 2022 ICC Women's T20 World Cup Qualifier tournament. Originally scheduled to take place in Scotland, the tournament was moved to the La Manga Club, Spain, due to the COVID-19 pandemic.

France and Turkey were both scheduled to make their debuts at an ICC women's event. However, on 25 August 2021, the International Cricket Council (ICC) confirmed that Turkey had withdrawn from the tournament, as they were unable to get approval to travel from the Turkish Sports Ministry.

On the opening day of the tournament, Dutch cricketer Frederique Overdijk became the first bowler, male or female, to take seven wickets in a T20I match. Scotland won the tournament, winning all four of their matches, and progressed to the Women's World Twenty20 Qualifier tournament. Ireland finished in second place, after beating the Netherlands in their final match, with Ireland's Eimear Richardson being named the player of the tournament. Ireland may still advance to the Women's World Twenty20 Qualifier tournament via the place available to the highest ranked non-qualified team.

During the tournament, questions were raised about the quality of the pitch at La Manga. This resulted in the ICC moving the European 2022 Under-19 Cricket World Cup qualification matches from La Manga to the Desert Springs Cricket Ground in Almeria.

== Squads ==
The following teams and squads were named for the tournament:

France	Germany	Ireland	Netherlands	Scotland
Emmanuelle Brelivet (c); Jennifer King (vc); Lara Armas; Cindy Bretéché; Tara Britton; Alix Brodin; Maëlle Cargouët (wk); Emma Chancé; Thea Graham; Magali Marchello-Nizia; Poppy McGeown; Tracy Rodriguez; Marie Violleau; Irma Vrignaud	Anuradha Doddaballapur (c); Emma Bargna; Milena Beresford; Anne Bierwisch; Stephanie Frohnmayer; Christina Gough; Anna Healey; Bianca Loch; Suzanne McAnanama-Brereton; Antonia Meyenborg; Janet Ronalds; Sharanya Sadarangani; Karthika Vijayaraghavan; Peris Wadenpohl	Laura Delany (c); Ava Canning; Georgina Dempsey; Amy Hunter; ~~Shauna Kavanagh~~; Gaby Lewis; Louise Little; Sophie MacMahon; Lara Maritz; Cara Murray; Leah Paul; Orla Prendergast; Eimear Richardson; Rebecca Stokell; Mary Waldron	Heather Siegers (c); Marloes Braat; Hannah Landheer; Babette de Leede; Caroline de Lange; Eva Lynch; Frederique Overdijk; Robine Rijke; Juliët Post; Silver Siegers; Annemijn Thomson; Isabel van der Woning; Miranda Veringmeier; Iris Zwilling	Kathryn Bryce (c); Sarah Bryce (vc); Abbi Aitken-Drummond; Priyanaz Chatterji; Katherine Fraser; Becky Glen; Samantha Haggo; Lorna Jack; Ailsa Lister; Abtaha Maqsood; Megan McColl; Katie McGill; Hannah Rainey; Charis Scott

On 23 August 2021, Shauna Kavanagh was ruled out of Ireland's squad following a positive test for COVID-19. Amy Hunter was named as her replacement.

== Points table ==
Pos	Team	Pld	W	L	NR	Pts	NRR
1	Scotland	4	4	0	0	8	2.842
2	Ireland	4	3	1	0	6	3.743
3	Netherlands	4	2	2	0	4	0.870
4	Germany	4	1	3	0	2	−3.188
5	France	4	0	4	0	0	−5.647

Updated to match(es) played on completed. Source: ESPN Cricinfo

advanced to the global qualifier

== Fixtures ==
The fixtures for the Europe Qualifier were confirmed on 16 August 2021.

26 August 2021
10:30
Scorecard

Netherlands; 98/5 (20 overs)	v	Scotland; 99/4 (16.3 overs)
Robine Rijke 43 (47); Katie McGill 1/11 (2 overs)		Sarah Bryce 46 (36); Caroline de Lange 4/17 (4 overs)

Scotland won by 6 wickets
La Manga Club (Top Ground), Cartagena
Umpires: Rizwan Akram (Ned) and David McLean (Sco)
Player of the match: Sarah Bryce (Sco)

- Scotland won the toss and elected to field.

26 August 2021
10:30
Scorecard

Ireland; 196/2 (20 overs)	v	Germany; 32/3 (20 overs)
Gaby Lewis 105* (60); Bianca Loch 1/21 (3 overs)		Christina Gough 14 (58); Eimear Richardson 2/5 (3 overs)

Ireland won by 164 runs
La Manga Club (Bottom Ground), Cartagena
Umpires: Alex Dowdalls (Sco) and Adnan Khan (Esp)
Player of the match: Gaby Lewis (Ire)

- Germany won the toss and elected to field.
- Gaby Lewis became the first cricketer for Ireland to score a century in WT20Is.

26 August 2021
15:30
Scorecard

France; 33 (17.3 overs)	v	Netherlands; 34/1 (3.3 overs)
Poppy McGeown 8 (21); Frederique Overdijk 7/3 (4 overs)		Robine Rijke 21* (12); Thea Graham 1/11 (2 overs)

Netherlands won by 9 wickets
La Manga Club (Top Ground), Cartagena
Umpires: Alex Dowdalls (Sco) and Mark Jameson (Ger)
Player of the match: Frederique Overdijk (Ned)

- France won the toss and elected to bat.
- Frederique Overdijk (Ned) took her first five-wicket haul in WT20Is.

27 August 2021
10:30
Scorecard

France; 45 (15 overs)	v	Germany; 46/1 (9.3 overs)
Thea Graham 12 (25); Bianca Loch 3/12 (4 overs)		Anuradha Doddaballapur 22* (40); Thea Graham 1/12 (3 overs)

Germany won by 9 wickets
La Manga Club (Bottom Ground), Cartagena
Umpires: Adnan Khan (Esp) and David McLean (Sco)
Player of the match: Bianca Loch (Ger)

- France won the toss and elected to bat.
- Lara Armas (Fra) made her WT20I debut.

27 August 2021
10:30
Scorecard

Ireland; 89/9 (20 overs)	v	Scotland; 92/5 (19 overs)
Rebecca Stokell 21 (34); Katherine Fraser 3/14 (4 overs)		Kathryn Bryce 46* (58); Ava Canning 2/5 (4 overs)

Scotland won by 5 wickets
La Manga Club (Top Ground), Cartagena
Umpires: Rizwan Akram (Ned) and Adriaan van den Dries (Ned)
Player of the match: Kathryn Bryce (Sco)

- Ireland won the toss and elected to bat.

27 August 2021
15:30
Scorecard

Germany; 71/6 (20 overs)	v	Netherlands; 72/3 (15 overs)
Christina Gough 34 (47); Eva Lynch 2/7 (3 overs)		Babette de Leede 32 (37); Anna Healey 1/11 (4 overs)

Netherlands won by 7 wickets
La Manga Club (Bottom Ground), Cartagena
Umpires: Rizwan Akram (Ned) and Mark Jameson (Ger)
Player of the match: Babette de Leede (Ned)

- Netherlands won the toss and elected to field.

29 August 2021
10:30
Scorecard

Germany; 36 (19 overs)	v	Scotland; 38/0 (5 overs)
Karthika Vijayaraghavan 7* (29); Katherine Fraser 3/6 (4 overs)		Sarah Bryce 23* (21)

Scotland won by 10 wickets
La Manga Club (Top Ground), Cartagena
Umpires: Adriaan van den Dries (Ned) and David McLean (Sco)
Player of the match: Katherine Fraser (Sco)

- Scotland won the toss and elected to field.

29 August 2021
10:30
Scorecard

France; 24 (16.1 overs)	v	Ireland; 25/0 (2.4 overs)
Tracy Rodriguez 3 (12); Eimear Richardson 2/0 (2 overs)		Louise Little 12* (7)

Ireland won by 10 wickets
La Manga Club (Bottom Ground), Cartagena
Umpires: Rizwan Akram (Ned) and Adnan Khan (Esp)
Player of the match: Eimear Richardson (Ire)

- Ireland won the toss and elected to field.

30 August 2021
10:30
Scorecard

Ireland; 111/9 (20 overs)	v	Netherlands; 87/9 (20 overs)
Eimear Richardson 53 (49); Eva Lynch 4/24 (4 overs)		Robine Rijke 32 (36); Cara Murray 3/9 (3 overs)

Ireland won by 24 runs
La Manga Club (Top Ground), Cartagena
Umpires: Mark Jameson (Ger) and David McLean (Sco)
Player of the match: Eimear Richardson (Ire)

- Netherlands won the toss and elected to field.

30 August 2021
10:30
Scorecard

France; 24 (17.4 overs)	v	Scotland; 25/3 (2.2 overs)
Jennifer King 8 (24); Megan McColl 5/3 (4 overs)		Sarah Bryce 9 (4); Marie Violleau 2/11 (1 over)

Scotland won by 7 wickets
La Manga Club (Bottom Ground), Cartagena
Umpires: Rizwan Akram (Ned) and Adriaan van den Dries (Ned)
Player of the match: Megan McColl (Sco)

- Scotland won the toss and elected to field.
- Megan McColl (Sco) took her first five-wicket haul in WT20Is.
