= 2019 Women's T20 World Cup Europe Qualifier =

Cricket tournament

2019 ICC Women's Qualifier Europe
- Dates: 26 – 29 June 2019
- Administrator: International Cricket Council
- Cricket format: Twenty20 International
- Tournament format: Double round-robin
- Host: Spain
- Champions: Netherlands
- Runners-up: Scotland
- Participants: 3
- Matches: 6
- Most runs: (Netherlands) Sterre Kalis (158)
- Most wickets: (Netherlands) Heather Siegers (7)

The 2019 ICC Women's Qualifier Europe was a cricket tournament that was held in Spain in June 2019. The matches in the tournament were played as Women's Twenty20 Internationals (WT20Is), with the top team progressing to both the 2019 ICC Women's World Twenty20 Qualifier and the 2021 Women's Cricket World Cup Qualifier tournaments.

In March 2019, Scotland was confirmed as the host nation for the Women's World Twenty20 Qualifier tournament. Therefore, if Scotland won the Europe Qualifier group, the next highest positioned team would also progress to the 2019 ICC Women's World Twenty20 Qualifier tournament. On 31 May 2019, the International Cricket Council (ICC) confirmed all of the squads for the tournament.

On 26 June 2019, in the opening fixture of the tournament, Germany played their first ever WT20I match. The following day, the match between Scotland and the Netherlands ended in a tie, with Scotland winning the Super Over. Ahead of the final day of fixtures, all three teams were still in contention to win the qualifier. On the final day of the qualifier, both Scotland and the Netherlands won their match against Germany. Therefore, the Netherlands won the tournament, after finishing ahead of Scotland on net run rate.

== Teams ==
The following teams competed in the tournament:

- Germany
- Netherlands
- Scotland

== Points table ==
Pos	Team	Pld	W	L	T	NR	Pts	NRR	
1	Netherlands	4	3	1	0	0	6	2.899	Advanced to qualifying tournament (Note: Scotland advance automatically as host of the qualifying tournament)
2	Scotland	4	3	1	0	0	6	2.371	Advanced to qualifying tournament
3	Germany	4	0	4	0	0	0	−5.967	

== Fixtures ==
26 June 2019
10:30
Scorecard

Germany; 37/8 (20 overs)	v	Scotland; 38/2 (6 overs)
Suzanne McAnanama-Brereton 5 (14); Priyanaz Chatterji 3/5 (4 overs)		Sarah Bryce 19* (16); Emma Bargna 2/21 (3 overs)

Scotland Women won by 8 wickets
La Manga Club, Murcia
Umpires: Rakbir Hasan (Ita) and Pim van Liemt (Ned)

- Scotland Women won the toss and elected to field.
- Emma Bargna, Milena Beresford, Anne Bierwisch, Stephanie Frohnmayer, Christina Gough, Anna Healey, Suzanne McAnanama-Brereton, Janet Ronalds, Verena Stolle, Karthika Vijayaraghavan, Peris Wadenpohl (Ger) and Megan McColl (Sco) all made their WT20I debuts.

26 June 2019
15:30 (D/N)
Scorecard

Netherlands; 123/8 (20 overs)	v	Scotland; 116/8 (20 overs)
Denise van Deventer 35 (33); Katie McGill 2/9 (2 overs)		Priyanaz Chatterji 26* (26); Heather Siegers 2/10 (4 overs)

Netherlands Women won by 7 runs
La Manga Club, Murcia
Umpires: Alex Dowdalls (Sco) and Pim van Liemt (Ned)

- Scotland Women won the toss and elected to field.
- Hannah Landheer, Caroline de Lange, Iris Zwilling (Ned) and Samantha Haggo (Sco) all made their WT20I debuts.

27 June 2019
10:30
Scorecard

Netherlands; 196/3 (20 overs)	v	Germany; 65/7 (20 overs)
Sterre Kalis 126* (76); Stephanie Frohnmayer 1/28 (4 overs)		Christina Gough 22 (33); Annemijn van Beuge 2/4 (4 overs)

Netherlands Women won by 131 runs
La Manga Club, Murcia
Umpires: Alex Dowdalls (Sco) and Rakbir Hasan (Ita)

- Germany Women won the toss and elected to field.
- Annemijn van Beuge (Ned) made her WT20I debut.
- Sterre Kalis (Ned) scored her first century in WT20Is and equaled the record for the highest score in a WT20I, which was broken one month later.

27 June 2019
15:30 (D/N)
Scorecard

Scotland; 96 (18.5 overs)	v	Netherlands; 96/7 (20 overs)
Kathryn Bryce 34 (39); Caroline de Lange 3/10 (4 overs)		Babette de Leede 27* (26); Kathryn Bryce 2/4 (3 overs)

Match tied
(Scotland Women won the Super Over)
La Manga Club, Murcia
Umpires: Alex Dowdalls (Sco) and Pim van Liemt (Ned)

- Netherlands Women won the toss and elected to field.

29 June 2019
10:30
Scorecard

Scotland; 168/7 (20 overs)	v	Germany; 61/7 (20 overs)
Kathryn Bryce 65 (46); Christina Gough 3/32 (4 overs)		Christina Gough 17 (22); Katie McGill 3/13 (4 overs)

Scotland Women won by 107 runs
La Manga Club, Murcia
Umpires: Rakbir Hasan (Ita) and Pim van Liemt (Ned)

- Scotland Women won the toss and elected to bat.
- Antonia Meyenborg, Selina Meyenborg (Ger), Katherine Fraser and Charis Scott (Sco) all made their WT20I debuts.

29 June 2019
15:30 (D/N)
Scorecard

Germany; 63/9 (20 overs)	v	Netherlands; 64/1 (7 overs)
Janet Ronalds 22 (38); Eva Lynch 2/4 (4 overs)		Heather Siegers 36* (26); Stephanie Frohnmayer 1/19 (2 overs)

Netherlands Women won by 9 wickets
La Manga Club, Murcia
Umpires: Alex Dowdalls (Sco) and Rakbir Hasan (Ita)

- Germany Women won the toss and elected to bat.
- Kainat Qureshi (Ger) and Eva Lynch (Ned) both made their WT20I debuts.
