= Sharanya Sadarangani =

Indian-born German cricketer

Personal information
- Full name: Sharanya Sadarangani
- Born: 3 July 1995 (age 31); Bengaluru, India
- Batting: Right-handed
- Bowling: Right-arm spin
- Role: Wicket-keeper-batter

International information
- National side: Germany
- T20I debut (cap 17): 12 August 2020 v Austria
- Last T20I: 28 May 2025 v Sweden

Domestic team information
- Years: Team
- 2014: Essex

Career statistics
Competition	WT20I
Matches	40
Runs scored	252
Batting average	10.50
100s/50s	0/0
Top score	32*
Balls bowled	387
Wickets	13
Bowling average	25.92
5 wickets in innings	0
10 wickets in match	0
Best bowling	3/8
Catches/stumpings	6/5
- Source: Cricinfo, 30 May 2025

Sharanya "Sharu" Sadarangani (born 3 July 1995) is an Indian-born cricketer who plays for the Germany women's national cricket team as a wicket-keeper-batter, and sometimes as a bowler. Previously, she has played internationally for Denmark, and in English county cricket for Essex. In 2020, she became the first female cricketer to play in the European Cricket Series.

== Early life and career ==
Sadarangani began playing cricket as a young child in her hometown of Bengaluru, India. When she was in elementary school, was the only girl who played on the boy's cricket team and was required to obtain special permission from the national association to do so. A gifted child she also excelled creatively writing complex, novel-length stories while in elementary school. She also benefited from coaching at the Karnataka Institute of Cricket (KIOC), and played several times for the U-16 and U-19 Karnataka women's cricket teams, including a few matches under the stewardship of later Indian women's team cricketer Veda Krishnamurthy.

After completing a Pre-University degree at Jain College in Bengaluru, Sadarangani moved to Essex in England to study for a bachelor's degree in Liberal Arts. There, she also played for the Essex women's cricket team. A couple of years later, she relocated to Germany to pursue another educational degree, and began teaching English and coaching young cricketers. She also started playing the game for a club team in neighbouring Denmark.

== International career ==
In June 2017, Sadarangani was selected for the Denmark national team squad. Two months later, in August 2017, she played for Denmark as a wicket-keeper-batter, in a European Women's T20 tournament in Antwerp, Belgium.

In the first match of a bilateral series between Germany and Austria held on 12 August 2020 at the Seebarn Cricket Ground near Vienna, Sadarangani made her debut for Germany, and also in Women's Twenty20 Internationals (WT20Is), as a specialist batter. In the third match of that series, held on 13 August 2020, she top scored for Germany with 25*, and also kept wicket for the first time in a WT20I.

On 8 July 2021, Sadarangani bowled for the first time in a WT20I, in the first match of another bilateral series, between Germany and France at the Bayer Uerdingen Cricket Ground, Krefeld. She also recorded her team's best bowling figures of 2 wickets for 10 runs. In the fifth and final match of that series, played on 10 July 2021, she was even more successful as a bowler, with figures of 2 for 6. The following month, she played in all four of Germany's matches in the 2021 ICC Women's T20 World Cup Europe Qualifier.

== Personal life ==
Sadarangani worked in Germany as an English teacher for three years and is now doing public relations work for the national association. She met her husband Finn after moving to Germany; they live in Sasel, a suburb of Hamburg.

== See also ==
- List of Germany women Twenty20 International cricketers
