= Alex Dowdalls =

Cricket umpire

Personal information
- Full name: Alex Dowdalls
- Born: 30 January 1960 (age 66)
- Role: Umpire

Umpiring information
- ODIs umpired: 8 (2017–2019)
- T20Is umpired: 6 (2017–2018)
- WT20Is umpired: 7 (2011–2021)
- Source: Cricinfo, 21 August 2019

Alex Dowdalls (born 30 January 1960) is a Scottish cricket umpire and sports journalist focusing mainly on football.

Alex began umpiring in 1993 with his first appointment with the European Cricket Council coming in 1999, an ICC under-19 World Cup qualifier in Penicuik between Ireland and Denmark.

He stood in matches during the 2016 ICC World Cricket League Division Five tournament in Jersey.

On 15 January 2017 he made his Twenty20 International (T20I) umpiring debut in a match between Oman and the Netherlands in the 2017 Desert T20 Challenge. His first One Day International (ODI) match as an umpire was between the United Arab Emirates and Hong Kong on 26 January 2017. He was one of the eight on-field umpires for the 2019 ICC World Cricket League Division Two tournament in Namibia.

In August 2019, during the 2019 Scotland Tri-Nation Series match between Scotland and Papua New Guinea, Dowdalls umpired in his 250th international match, the most by any Scottish umpire.

In 2002 Dowdalls was convicted of a road rage incident when he grabbed and shouted at a female driver on the M8 motorway after her car bumped into his.

== See also ==
- List of One Day International cricket umpires
- List of Twenty20 International cricket umpires
