= Italy women's national cricket team =

Cricket team

Italy
- Italian Cricket Federation logo
- Association: Italian Cricket Federation

International Cricket Council
- ICC status: Associate member (1995); Affiliate member (1984)
- ICC region: Europe
ICC Rankings	Current	Best-ever
T20I	23rd	23rd (21 Aug 2025)

International cricket
- First international: v Belgium at Bologna; 16 August 2013

T20 Internationals
- First T20I: v. Austria at Roma Cricket Ground, Rome; 9 August 2021
- Last T20I: v. Nepal at Gahanga B Ground, Kigali; 1 May 2026
T20Is	Played	Won/Lost
Total	57	38/19 (0 ties, 0 no results)
This year	8	3/5 (0 ties, 0 no results)
- As of 1 May 2026

The Italy women's national cricket team is the team that represents the country of Italy in international women's cricket matches. They have been an associate member of the International Cricket Council (ICC) since 1995, having previously been an affiliate member since 1984. The Italian women's national cricket team is administered by the Italian Cricket Federation.

In April 2018, the ICC granted full Women's Twenty20 International (WT20I) status to all its members. Therefore, all Twenty20 matches played between Italy women and other ICC members after 1 July 2018 will have the full WT20I status.

== History ==
The Italian Cricket Federation (FCI) established a domestic tournament for women in 2001. It was abandoned after two years and resumed in 2009, featuring up to seven teams before it was again abandoned in 2017. The national team made its debut in 2013, hosting a five-team tournament in Bologna that also featured Belgium, Denmark, Estonia and Gibraltar.

A new six-team national women's league was announced in 2020 and began play in 2021. Italy made its Twenty20 International debut against Austria in August 2021, hosting a five-match series. Prior to the series the FCI organised training camps in the north and south of the country before selecting a 20-woman squad. Austria won the series 3–2.

In 2023, it was announced Italy would participate in the qualifying process for the ICC Women's T20 World Cup for the first time, by playing in the Europe Division Two qualifier in Jersey.

== Current Squad ==
Updated on 28 July 2024.

This lists all the players who have played for Italy in the past 12 months or were part of the most recent squad.

Name	Age	Batting style	Bowling style	Notes
Batter
Sharon Withanage	45	Right-handed	Right-arm off break	
All-rounders
Kumudu Peddrick	43	Right-handed	Right-arm medium	
Dilaisha Nanayakkara	29	Right-handed	Right-arm off break	
Chathurika Mahamalage	39	Right-handed	Right-arm medium	
Emilia Bartram	32	Left-handed	Right-arm medium	Captain
Regina Suddahazai	21	Right-handed	Right-arm off break	
Sadalee Malwatta	21	Right-handed	Right-arm medium	
Ilenia Sims	24	Right-handed	Right-arm off break	
Wicketkeepers
Methnara Rathnayake	20	Right-handed	-	
Ishara Jayamannage	40	Right-handed	-	
Spin Bowlers
Teshani Araliya	35	Left-handed	Slow left-arm orthodox	
Luana Sims	21	Right-handed	Right-arm off break	
Pace Bowlers
Nimesha Ekanayake	32	Right-handed	Right-arm medium-fast	
Pasindi Kanankege	20	Right-handed	Right-arm medium	
Emma Moore	17	Right-handed	Right-arm medium	
Himanshi Daluwatta	20	Right-handed	Right-arm medium	

== Records and statistics ==
International Match Summary — Italy Women

Last updated 1 May 2026

Playing Record
Format	M	W	L	T	NR	Inaugural Match
Twenty20 Internationals	57	38	19	0	0	9 August 2021

=== Twenty20 International ===
- Highest team total: 163/4 v. Austria on 20 August 2022 at Seebarn Cricket Ground, Lower Austria.
- Highest individual score: 86, Dilaisha Nanayakkara v. Jersey on 25 May 2025 at Roma Cricket Ground, Rome.
- Best individual bowling figures: 4/10, Kumudu Peddrick v. France on 7 September 2023 at Desert Springs Cricket Ground, Almería.

T20I record versus other nations

Records complete to WT20I #2753. Last updated 1 May 2026.

Opponent	M	W	L	T	NR	First match	First win
v. Full Members
Ireland	2	0	2	0	0	23 August 2025	
ICC Associate members
Austria	10	7	3	0	0	9 August 2021	9 August 2021
France	3	3	0	0	0	29 May 2023	29 May 2023
Germany	8	8	0	0	0	1 June 2023	1 June 2023
Isle of Man	2	2	0	0	0	13 November 2022	13 November 2022
Jersey	4	3	1	0	0	29 May 2023	26 July 2024
Malta	2	2	0	0	0	26 September 2024	26 September 2024
Nepal	2	0	2	0	0	19 April 2026	
Netherlands	6	0	6	0	0	8 September 2023	
Norway	1	1	0	0	0	11 November 2022	11 November 2022
Rwanda	2	1	1	0	0	18 April 2026	18 April 2026
Scotland	2	0	2	0	0	6 September 2023	
Spain	2	2	0	0	0	14 November 2022	14 November 2022
Sweden	6	6	0	0	0	12 November 2022	12 November 2022
Turkey	1	1	0	0	0	2 June 2023	2 June 2023
United States	2	0	2	0	0	24 April 2026	
Vanuatu	2	2	0	0	0	21 April 2026	21 April 2026

== Tournament history ==
=== ICC Women's World T20 ===
Twenty20 World Cup Record
Year	Round	Position	GP	W	L	T	NR
(England) 2009	Did not qualify						
(Cricket West Indies) 2010	Did not qualify						
(Sri Lanka) 2012	Did not qualify						
(Bangladesh) 2014	Did not qualify						
(India) 2016	Did not qualify						
(Cricket West Indies) 2018	Did not qualify						
(Australia) 2020	Did not qualify						
(South Africa) 2023	Did not qualify						
(United Arab Emirates) 2024	Did not qualify						
(England) 2026	To be determined						
Total	0/9	0 Titles	0	0	0	0	0

=== ICC Women's World Cup ===
World Cup record
Year	Round	Position	GP	W	L	T	NR
(England) 1973	Did not qualify/No women's ODI status						
(India) 1978	Did not qualify/No women's ODI status						
(New Zealand) 1982	Did not qualify/No women's ODI status						
(Australia) 1988	Did not qualify/No women's ODI status						
(England) 1993	Did not qualify/No women's ODI status						
(India) 1997	Did not qualify/No women's ODI status						
(New Zealand) 2000	Did not qualify/No women's ODI status						
(South Africa) 2005	Did not qualify/No women's ODI status						
(Australia) 2009	Did not qualify/No women's ODI status						
(India) 2013	Did not qualify/No women's ODI status						
(England) 2017	Did not qualify/No women's ODI status						
(New Zealand) 2022	Did not qualify/No women's ODI status						
(India) 2025	Did not qualify/No women's ODI status						
Total	0/12	0 Titles	0	0	0	0	0

=== ICC Women's T20 World Cup Europe Qualifier ===
ICC Women's T20 World Cup Europe Qualifier records
Year	Round	Position	GP	W	L	T	NR
(Spain) 2019	Did not participate						
(Spain) 2021	Did not participate						
Total	0/2	0 Title	0	0	0	0	0

=== ICC Women's T20 World Cup Europe Qualifier Division One ===
ICC Women's T20 World Cup Europe Qualifier Division One records
Host Year	Round	Position	GP	W	L	T	NR
(Spain) 2023	Runners-up	3/4	6	2	4	0	0
(Netherlands) 2025	Runners-up	3/4	6	2	4	0	0
Total	2/2	0 Titles	12	4	8	0	0

=== ICC Women's T20 World Cup Europe Qualifier Division Two ===
ICC Women's T20 World Cup Europe Qualifier Division Two records
Host Year	Round	Position	GP	W	L	T	NR
(Jersey) 2023	Runners-up	2/6	5	4	1	0	0
(Italy) 2025	Champion	1/6	5	5	0	0	0
Total	2/2	0 Titles	10	9	1	0	0

=== Women's European Cricket Championship ===
Women's European Cricket Championship records
Year	Round	Position	GP	W	L	T	NR
(Denmark) 1989	Did not participate						
(England) 1990	Did not participate						
(Netherlands) 1991	Did not participate						
(Republic of Ireland) 1995	Did not participate						
(Denmark) 1999	Did not participate						
(England) 2001	Did not participate						
(Wales) 2005	Did not participate						
(Netherlands) 2007	Did not participate						
(Republic of Ireland) 2009	Did not participate						
(Scotland) 2010	Did not participate						
(Netherlands) 2011	Did not participate						
(England) 2014	Did not participate						
Total	0/12	0 Title	0	0	0	0	0

=== Cricket at Summer Olympics Games ===
Cricket at Summer Olympics records
Host Year	Round	Position	GP	W	L	T	NR
(United States) 2028	To be determined						
(Australia) 2032	To be determined						
Total	–	0 Title	0	0	0	0	0

=== ICC Women's T20 Champions Trophy ===
ICC Women's T20 Champions Trophy records
Host Year	Round	Position	GP	W	L	T	NR
(Sri Lanka) 2027	To be determined						
2031	To be determined						
Total	–	0 Title	0	0	0	0	0

== See also ==
- List of Italy women Twenty20 International cricketers
