= Germany women's national cricket team =

Germany
- German Cricket Federation logo
- Nickname: Golden Eagles
- Association: German Cricket Federation

Personnel
- Captain: Asmita Kohli

International Cricket Council
- ICC status: Associate member (1999); Affiliate member (1991)
- ICC region: Europe
ICC Rankings	Current	Best-ever
T20I	34th	24th (29 Aug 2021)

T20 Internationals
- First T20I: v. Scotland at La Manga Club Ground, Cartagena; 26 June 2019
- Last T20I: v. Denmark at GelsenTrabPark, Gelsenkirchen; 30 August 2026
T20Is	Played	Won/Lost
Total	72	37/34 (0 ties, 1 no result)
This year	9	5/3 (0 ties, 1 no result)
- As of 30 August 2026

The Germany woman's national cricket team represents the country of Germany in international women's cricket matches. The team is organised by German Cricket Federation and has been an associate member of the International Cricket Council (ICC) since 1999. Germany was previously an affiliate member from 1991 to 1999.

== History ==
In 2011 Germany finished runner-up to Jersey in the European Women's Cricket Festival hosted in Utrecht, Netherlands.

In April 2018, the ICC granted full Women's Twenty20 International (WT20I) status to all its members. Therefore, all Twenty20 matches played between Germany women and other ICC members after 1 July 2018 have the full WT20I status. On 26 June 2019, in the opening fixture of the 2019 ICC Women's Qualifier Europe tournament, Germany played their first ever WT20I match, against Scotland.

Germany was invited to the 2022 Kwibuka Women's T20 Tournament in Rwanda, becoming one of the first two non-African teams to participate in the tournament along with Brazil. Germany lost seven consecutive matches in the round-robin stage of the tournament, before defeating Botswana in the seventh-place play-off.

== Tournament history ==
=== ICC Women's World Cup ===
World Cup record
Year	Round	Position	GP	W	L	T	NR
(England) 1973	Did not qualify/No women's ODI status						
(India) 1978	Did not qualify/No women's ODI status						
(New Zealand) 1982	Did not qualify/No women's ODI status						
(Australia) 1988	Did not qualify/No women's ODI status						
(England) 1993	Did not qualify/No women's ODI status						
(India) 1997	Did not qualify/No women's ODI status						
(New Zealand) 2000	Did not qualify/No women's ODI status						
(South Africa) 2005	Did not qualify/No women's ODI status						
(Australia) 2009	Did not qualify/No women's ODI status						
(India) 2013	Did not qualify/No women's ODI status						
(England) 2017	Did not qualify/No women's ODI status						
(New Zealand) 2022	Did not qualify/No women's ODI status						
(India) 2025	Did not qualify/No women's ODI status						
Total	0/12	0 Titles	0	0	0	0	0

=== ICC Women's World T20 ===
Twenty20 World Cup Record
Year	Round	Position	GP	W	L	T	NR
(England) 2009	Did not qualify						
(Cricket West Indies) 2010	Did not qualify						
(Sri Lanka) 2012	Did not qualify						
(Bangladesh) 2014	Did not qualify						
(India) 2016	Did not qualify						
(Cricket West Indies) 2018	Did not qualify						
(Australia) 2020	Did not qualify						
(South Africa) 2023	Did not qualify						
(United Arab Emirates) 2024	Did not qualify						
(England) 2026	To be determined						
Total	0/8	0 Titles	0	0	0	0	0

=== ICC Women's World Twenty20 Europe Qualifier ===
ICC Women's Twenty20 Qualifier Europe records
Year	Round	Position	GP	W	L	T	NR
(Spain) 2019	Did not qualify	3/3	4	0	4	0	0
(Spain) 2021	Did not qualify	4/5	4	1	3	0	0
Total	2/2	0 Title	8	1	7	0	0

=== ICC Women's T20 World Cup Europe Qualifier Division One ===
ICC Women's T20 World Cup Europe Qualifier Division One records
Host Year	Round	Position	GP	W	L	T	NR
(Spain) 2023	Did not qualify						
(Netherlands) 2025	DNQ	4/4	6	0	6	0	0
Total	1/2	0 Titles	6	0	6	0	0

=== ICC Women's T20 World Cup Europe Qualifier Division Two ===
ICC Women's T20 World Cup Europe Qualifier Division Two records
Host Year	Round	Position	GP	W	L	T	NR
(Jersey) 2023	DNQ	4/6	5	3	2	0	0
(Italy) 2025	Qualified/Runners-up	2/6	5	4	1	0	0
Total	2/2	0 Titles	10	7	3	0	0

=== Women's European Cricket Championship ===
Women's European Cricket Championship records
Year	Round	Position	GP	W	L	T	NR
(Denmark) 1989	Did not participate						
(England) 1990	Did not participate						
(Netherlands) 1991	Did not participate						
(Republic of Ireland) 1995	Did not participate						
(Denmark) 1999	Did not participate						
(England) 2001	Did not participate						
(Wales) 2005	Did not participate						
(Netherlands) 2007	Did not participate						
(Republic of Ireland) 2009	Did not participate						
(Scotland) 2010	Did not participate						
(Netherlands) 2011	Did not participate						
(England) 2014	Did not participate						
Total	0/12	0 Title	0	0	0	0	0

=== Cricket at Summer Olympics Games ===
Cricket at Summer Olympics records
Host Year	Round	Position	GP	W	L	T	NR
(United States) 2028	To be determined						
(Australia) 2032	To be determined						
Total	–	0 Title	0	0	0	0	0

=== ICC Women's T20 Champions Trophy ===
ICC Women's T20 Champions Trophy records
Host Year	Round	Position	GP	W	L	T	NR
(Sri Lanka) 2027	To be determined						
2031	To be determined						
Total	–	0 Title	0	0	0	0	0

== Records and statistics ==
International Match Summary — Germany Women

Last updated 30 August 2026

Playing Record
Format	M	W	L	T	NR	Inaugural Match
Twenty20 Internationals	72	37	34	0	1	26 June 2019

=== Twenty20 International ===
- Highest team total: 198/0 v. Austria on 14 August 2020 at Seebarn Cricket Ground, Lower Austria.
- Highest individual score: 105*, Janet Ronalds v. Austria on 13 August 2020 at Seebarn Cricket Ground, Lower Austria.
- Best individual bowling figures: 5/1, Anuradha Doddaballapur v. Austria on 14 August 2020 at Seebarn Cricket Ground, Lower Austria.

Most T20I runs for Germany Women

Player	Runs	Average	Career span
Christina Gough	1,364	38.97	2019–2025
Janet Ronalds	889	25.40	2019–2025
Wilhelmina Hornero-Garcia	679	24.25	2022–2026
Shravya Kolcharam	450	16.07	2022–2026
Anuradha Doddaballapur	370	15.41	2020–2024

Most T20I wickets for Germany Women

Player	Wickets	Average	Career span
Asmita Kohli	47	19.76	2020–2026
Christina Gough	35	17.94	2019–2025
Anuradha Doddaballapur	33	10.39	2020–2024
Janet Ronalds	32	10.06	2019–2025
Emma Bargna	23	17.95	2019–2024
Milena Beresford	23	21.08	2019–2025

T20I record versus other nations

Records complete to WT20I #2985. Last updated 30 August 2026.

Opponent	M	W	L	T	NR	First match	First win
ICC Full members
Ireland	3	0	3	0	0	26 August 2021	
ICC Associate members
Austria	5	5	0	0	0	12 August 2020	12 August 2020
Botswana	2	1	1	0	0	14 June 2022	17 June 2022
Brazil	1	0	1	0	0	11 June 2022	
Denmark	3	2	1	0	0	31 August 2025	31 August 2025
Finland	1	1	0	0	0	29 August 2025	29 August 2025
France	7	6	1	0	0	8 July 2021	8 July 2021
Greece	4	4	0	0	0	10 May 2025	10 May 2025
Isle of Man	1	1	0	0	0	29 May 2025	29 May 2025
Italy	8	0	8	0	0	1 June 2023	
Jersey	4	3	1	0	0	30 May 2023	30 May 2023
Kenya	1	0	1	0	0	16 June 2022	
Namibia	3	0	3	0	0	2 July 2022	
Netherlands	5	0	5	0	0	27 June 2019	
Nigeria	1	0	1	0	0	10 June 2022	
Norway	1	1	0	0	0	30 August 2025	30 August 2025
Oman	4	4	0	0	0	4 February 2020	4 February 2020
Rwanda	1	0	1	0	0	12 June 2022	
Scotland	3	0	3	0	0	26 June 2019	
Spain	1	1	0	0	0	25 May 2025	25 May 2025
Sweden	5	3	1	0	1	1 June 2023	1 June 2023
Switzerland	5	4	1	0	0	10 July 2026	10 July 2026
Tanzania	1	0	1	0	0	13 June 2022	
Turkey	1	1	0	0	0	29 May 2023	29 May 2023
Uganda	1	0	1	0	0	15 June 2022	

== Squad ==
This lists all the players who played for Germany in the past 12 months or were named in the most recent squad. Updated on 28 Jul 2024.

Name	Age	Batting style	Bowling style	Notes
Batters
Anne Bierwisch	38	Left-handed	Right-arm medium	
Christina Gough	32	Left-handed	Left-arm medium	
Rameesha Shahid	33	Right-handed	Left-arm medium	
Janet Ronalds	40	Right-handed	Right-arm off break	Captain
Sharmaine Mannan	38	Left-handed	Left-arm medium	
Wilhelmina Hornero-Garcia	21	Right-handed	Right-arm medium	
All-rounders
Anuradha Doddaballapur	40	Right-handed	Right-arm medium	Vice-captain
Sharanya Sadarangani	31	Right-handed	Right-arm medium	
Stephanie Frohnmayer	41	Right-handed	Right-arm medium	
Ashwini Balaji	21	Right-handed	Right-arm medium	
Wicket-keeper
Karthika Vijayaraghavan	38	Right-handed		
Spin Bowlers
Milena Beresford	30	Right-handed	Right-arm off break	
Asmita Kohli	26	Left-handed	Right-arm off break	
Pace Bowlers
Shravya Kolcharam	31	Right-handed	Right-arm medium	
Emma Bargna	21	Right-handed	Right-arm medium	
Suzanne McAnanama-Brereton	42	Left-handed	Right-arm medium	
Antonia Meyenborg	24	Right-handed	Right-arm medium	

== See also ==
- Germany national cricket team
- List of Germany women Twenty20 International cricketers
