= Bayer Uerdingen Cricket Ground =

Cricket ground

Coordinates: 51.36535°N 6.63056°E

- National Cricket Performance Centre, Krefeld Cricket Ground
- Interactive map of Bayer Uerdingen Cricket Ground

Ground information
- Location: Krefeld, Germany
- Country: Germany
- Establishment: 2021
- End names
- n/a n/a

International information
- First men's T20I: 5 August 2021: Germany v Norway
- Last men's T20I: 3 May 2026: Germany v Austria
- First women's T20I: 8 July 2021: Germany v France
- Last women's T20I: 28 July 2024: Germany v Italy
- As of 2 July 2026; Source: Cricinfo

The Bayer Uerdingen Cricket Ground is a cricket ground in Krefeld, Germany. Built to international standards, it is part of Germany's national cricket performance centre, which includes a three lane indoor training net facility.

The performance centre, a joint venture between the German Cricket Federation and SC Bayer 05 Uerdingen (since renamed to SC Krefeld 05), a local sports club, forms part of the Covestro Sportpark that also includes the Stadion am Löschenhofweg. The cricket ground was constructed over the winter of 2020–21.

In July 2021, the ground was the venue for the first ever Women's Twenty20 Internationals to be held in Germany, when Germany's women's team hosted a touring French women's team in a five-match bilateral series. Early the following month, the ground hosted the first Twenty20 Internationals to be held in Germany, when the German Cricket Federation staged a trilateral series there between Germany, Norway and France.

In July 2024 the ground held the sub-regional European qualifier B for the 2026 ICC Men's T20 World Cup, the first ICC event hosted by the German Cricket Federation.
