= Seebarn Cricket Ground =

Cricket ground

Coordinates: 48°22′59.55″N 16°23′19.53″E

- Interactive map of Seebarn Cricket Ground

Ground information
- Location: Seebarn, Austria
- Country: Austria
- Establishment: 1995

International information
- First T20I: 4 June 2022: Austria v Hungary
- Last T20I: 5 June 2022: Austria v Hungary
- First WT20I: 12 August 2020: Austria v Germany
- Last WT20I: 9 June 2024: Austria v Czech Republic

Team information
Austria national cricket team
Vienna Cricket Club
- As of 9 June 2024; Source: Ground profile

Seebarn Cricket Ground is a cricket ground in Seebarn, Austria. It was opened in 1995 as the first dedicated Cricket Ground in Austria. In 2000 a permanent sight screen was added to the ground and in 2001 a pavilion.

The ground is the home base of Austria's national cricket team as well as the Vienna Cricket Club and has hosted a number of international tournaments.

Between 2001 and 2004 there was a second ground adjacent to the remaining ground.
