= List of cricket grounds in the West Indies =

This is a list of cricket grounds in the West Indies that have been used for first-class, List A and Twenty20 cricket matches.

== Structure of cricket in the West Indies ==
The West Indies Cricket Board and the West Indies cricket team are made up of representatives from 15 mainly English-speaking countries in the Caribbean, which are:

- Anguilla (Note: dependency of the United Kingdom) (Note: plays as part of the Leeward Islands cricket team.)
- Antigua and Barbuda
- Barbados
- British Virgin Islands
- Dominica (Note: plays as part of the Windward Islands cricket team.)
- Grenada
- Guyana
- Jamaica
- Montserrat
- Saint Kitts and Nevis (Note: separate cricket associations exist for both Saint Kitts and Nevis.)
- Saint Lucia
- Saint Vincent and the Grenadines
- Sint Maarten (Note: constituent country of the Kingdom of the Netherlands)
- Trinidad and Tobago
- U.S. Virgin Islands (Note: unincorporated organized territory of the United States)
Location of all stadia which have hosted an international cricket match within Antigua and Barbuda
Location of all stadia which have hosted an international cricket match within Barbados
Location of all stadia which have hosted an international cricket match within Dominica
Location of all stadia which have hosted an international cricket match within Grenada
Location of all stadia which have hosted an international cricket match within Guyana
Locations of all stadia which have hosted an international cricket match within Jamaica
Location of all stadia which have hosted an international cricket match within Saint Kitts and Nevis
Location of all stadia which have hosted an international cricket match within Saint Lucia
Location of all stadia which have hosted an international cricket match within Saint Vincent and the Grenadines
Location of all stadia which have hosted an international cricket match within Trinidad & Tobago

== Test grounds ==
Name	City	Country (constituent island)	Capacity	First used	Tests	ODIs	T20Is	Notes
Kensington Oval	Bridgetown	Barbados	28,000	1930	53	35	17	
Queen's Park Oval	Port of Spain	Trinidad and Tobago	20,000	1930	61	68	6	
Bourda	Georgetown	Guyana	25,000	1930	30	11	0	
Sabina Park	Kingston	Jamaica	15,600	1930	50	37	3	
Antigua Recreation Ground	St. John's	Antigua and Barbuda	12,000	1981	22	11	0	
Arnos Vale Stadium	Kingstown	Saint Vincent and the Grenadines	18,000	1997	3	23	2	
National Cricket Stadium	St. George's	Grenada	20,000	2002	3	21	0	
Daren Sammy Cricket Ground	Gros Islet	Saint Lucia	15,000	2003	6	29	12	
Warner Park	Basseterre	Saint Kitts and Nevis	8,000	2006	3	17	5	
Providence Stadium	Providence	Guyana	15,000	2008	2	19	6	
Sir Vivian Richards Stadium	North Sound	Antigua and Barbuda	10,000	2009	6	17	4	
Windsor Park	Roseau	Dominica	12,000	2011	6	4	2	
Test grounds list of West Indies

== ODI Grounds ==
Name	City	Country (constituent island)	Capacity	First match	Tests	ODIs	T20Is	Notes
Albion Sports Complex	Albion	Guyana	15,000	1977	—	5	0	
Mindoo Phillip Park	Castries	Saint Lucia	n/a	1978	—	2	0	
Queen's Park (Old)	St. George's	Grenada	20,000	1983	—	1	0	

== Grounds listed by Country ==
- Grounds that have hosted international matches are listed in **bold**.

=== Anguilla ===
Name	City	Country (constituent island)	First used	Last used	F/C	LA	T20	Notes
Ronald Webster Park	The Valley	Anguilla	1995	2009	14	6	0	

=== Antigua and Barbuda ===
Name	City	Country (constituent island)	First used	Last used	F/C	LA	T20	Notes
Coolidge Cricket Ground	Osbourn	Antigua and Barbuda (Antigua)	2002	2008	2	0	46	Hosted the Stanford 20/20 tournaments and the 2008 Stanford Super Series.
**Antigua Recreation Ground**	St. John's	Antigua and Barbuda (Antigua)	1960	2009	63	46	0	Hosted 22 Tests and 11 ODIs.
**Sir Vivian Richards Stadium**	North Sound	Antigua and Barbuda (Antigua)	2007	2022	5	10	16	Hosted two Tests, 10 ODIs and 2 Twenty20 Internationals.

=== Barbados ===
Name	City	Country (constituent island)	First used	Last used	F/C	LA	T20	Notes
Desmond Haynes Oval	Black Rock	Barbados	2005	2014	2	5	0	Formerly known as Carlton Cricket Club Ground
Bay Pasture	Bridgetown	Barbados	1883	1891	5	0	0	
Garrison Savannah	Bridgetown	Barbados	1865	1865	1	0	0	Hosted the first first-class match in the West Indies in 1865 when Barbados played British Guiana.
**Kensington Oval**	Bridgetown	Barbados	1895	2022	321	126	84	Hosted 55 Tests, 42 ODIs and 23 Twenty20 Internationals.
3Ws Oval	Cave Hill	Barbados	2003	2020	30	28	1	
Mount Gay North Stars Cricket Ground	Crab Hill	Barbados	2003	2009	8	2	0	
Windward Park	Lucas Street	Barbados	2000	2018	6	17	0	Lucas Street is the name of a village, not the name of a street
Foursquare Park	Saint Philip	Barbados	2010	2010	2	0	0	
Police Sports Club Ground	Bridgetown	Barbados	2005	2009	1	2	0	This ground is also known as Weymouth Playing Field
Banks Holding Sports and Cultural Club Ground	Wildey	Barbados	2005	2005	0	2	0	The ground was also known as the Brewery Ground
Cable and Wireless Sports Club Ground	Wildey	Barbados	2005	2005	0	3	0	This ground is also known as LIME Sports Club Ground

=== British Virgin Islands ===
Name	City	Country (constituent island)	First used	Last used	F/C	LA	T20	Notes
A.O. Shirley Recreation Ground	Road Town	British Virgin Islands (Tortola)	2002	2002	1	0	0	

=== Dominica ===
Name	City	Country (constituent island)	First used	Last used	F/C	LA	T20	Notes
Benjamin's Park	Portsmouth	Dominica	2007	2007	1	1	0	
Botanical Gardens	Roseau	Dominica	1970	2004	8	0	0	
**Windsor Park**	Roseau	Dominica	1965	2022	35	7	2	Hosted 5 Tests, 4 ODIs and 2 T20Is

=== Grenada ===
Name	City	Country (constituent island)	First used	Last used	F/C	LA	T20	Notes
Progress Park	Grenville	Grenada	2009	2010	2	2	1	
**National Cricket Stadium**	St. George's	Grenada	1959	2022	59	41	10	Hosted 4 Tests, 25 ODIs and 6 T20Is. Stadium was rebuilt in 2004 after Hurricane Ivan, and is now known as National Stadium, having previously been known as Queen's Oval.
Tanteen Recreation Ground	St. George's	Grenada	1997	2007	5	1	0	

=== Guyana ===
Name	City	Country (constituent territory)	First used	Last used	F/C	LA	T20	Notes
**Albion Sports Complex**	Albion	Guyana	1977	2010	28	21	0	Hosted five ODIs.
Blairmont Sports Club Ground	Blairmont, Guyana	Guyana	1960	2008	4	8	0	
Enmore Recreation Ground	Enmore	Guyana	1993	2009	4	18	0	
**Bourda**	Georgetown	Guyana	1887	2011	187	48	0	Hosted 32 Tests and 13 ODIs.
Camp Ayanganna	Georgetown	Guyana	1987	1987	1	0	0	
Diamond Community Ground	Diamond, Guyana	Guyana	2001	2001	0	1	0	
Everest Cricket Club Ground	Georgetown	Guyana	1997	2011	5	9	0	
Parade Ground	Georgetown	Guyana	1865	1882	4	0	0	
Kayman Sankar Cricket Ground	Hampton Court	Guyana	1980	2005	5	11	0	
**Providence Stadium**	Providence	Guyana	2007	2022	46	48	42	Hosted two Tests, 22 ODIs and 10 Twenty20 Internationals.
Welfare Centre Ground	Rose Hall	Guyana	1961	1986	10	0	0	
Port Mourant Cricket Club	Port Mourant	Guyana	1916	2026	0	0	0	Important historic club ground of over 100 years— birthplace of various West Indies greats (Rohan Kanhai, Basil Butcher, Joe Solomon, Alvin Kallicharran, John Trim, Clive Lloyd, Ivan Madray, Randolph Ramnarace, Mahendra Nagamootoo, etc.)
Skeldon Community Centre	Skeldon	Guyana	1972	1995	3	1	0	
Uitvlugt Community Centre Ground	Uitvlugt	Guyana	1997	2009	3	12	0	

=== Jamaica ===
Name	City	Country (constituent island)	First used	Last used	F/C	LA	T20	Notes
Alcoa Sports Club Ground	Halse Hall	Jamaica	1985	2003	0	2	0	Previously known as the Jamalco Sports Club Ground
Kaiser Sports Club Ground	Discovery Bay	Jamaica	1978	2010	5	26	0	This ground is currently known as Port Rhoades Sports Club Ground
Trelawny Stadium	Trelawny	Jamaica	2008	2020	8	4	4	
Kensington Park	Kingston	Jamaica	1909	2010	7	11	0	
Melbourne Park	Kingston	Jamaica	1909	1962	23	0	0	No longer exists.
**Sabina Park**	Kingston	Jamaica	1895	2022	255	101	31	Hosted 54 Tests, 41 ODIs and 3 T20Is.
Sir Frank Worrell Cricket Ground	Kingston	Jamaica	2002	2004	1	2	0	Previously known as the University of the West Indies Ground
Jarrett Park	Montego Bay	Jamaica	1965	2010	18	5	0	
Alpart Sports Club Ground	Nain	Jamaica	1981	2011	14	15	0	
Old Harbour Road	Port Esquivel	Jamaica	2003	2004	0	2	0	
Chedwin Park	Spanish Town	Jamaica	1977	2011	13	16	0	

=== Montserrat ===
Name	City	Country (constituent island)	First used	Last used	F/C	LA	T20	Notes
Sturge Park	Plymouth	Montserrat	1967	1994	6	5	0	The city of Plymouth was destroyed after the 1995 eruption of the Soufrière Hills volcano.
Salem Oval	Salem	Montserrat	2003	2008	3	0	0	

=== Saint Kitts and Nevis ===
Name	City	Country (constituent island)	First used	Last used	F/C	LA	T20	Notes
**Warner Park**	Basseterre	Saint Kitts and Nevis (Saint Kitts)	1962	2026	69	42	84	Hosted three Tests, 18 ODIs and 10 T20Is.
St Mary's Park	Cayon	Saint Kitts and Nevis (Saint Kitts)	2007	2007	1	1	0	
Elquemedo Willett Park	Charlestown	Saint Kitts and Nevis (Nevis)	1977	2010	21	6	0	
Edgar Gilbert Sporting Complex	Molyneaux	Saint Kitts and Nevis (Saint Kitts)	2001	2005	5	0	0	
Conaree Sports Club	Basseterre	Saint Kitts and Nevis (Saint Kitts)	2007	2024	2	10	0	

=== Saint Lucia ===
Name	City	Country (constituent island)	First used	Last used	F/C	LA	T20	Notes
**Mindoo Philip Park**	Castries	Saint Lucia	1966	2006	27	13	0	Hosted two ODIs.
**Daren Sammy Cricket Ground**	Gros Islet	Saint Lucia	2002	2026	34	45	59	Hosted 9 Tests, 30 ODIs and 18 T20Is.

=== Saint Vincent and the Grenadines ===
Name	City	Country (constituent island)	First used	Last used	F/C	LA	T20	Notes
**Arnos Vale Stadium**	Kingstown	Saint Vincent and the Grenadines (Saint Vincent)	1972	2020	60	38	4	Hosted 3 Tests and 23 ODIs and 2 T20Is.

=== Sint Maarten ===
Name	City	Country (constituent island)	First used	Last used	F/C	LA	T20	Notes
Carib Lumber Ball Park	Philipsburg	Sint Maarten	2004	2009	6	1	0	

=== Trinidad & Tobago ===
Name	City	Country (constituent island)	First used	Last used	F/C	LA	T20	Notes
**Brian Lara Cricket Academy**	Tarouba	Trinidad and Tobago (Trinidad)	2016	2026	15	14	31	
Princess Royal Park	Arima	Trinidad and Tobago (Trinidad)	1971	1976	2	0	0	
Gilbert Park	California	Trinidad and Tobago (Trinidad)	1971	1979	14	0	0	
National Cricket Centre	Couva	Trinidad and Tobago (Trinidad)	2003	2016	11	4	0	
Wilson Road Recreation Ground	Penal	Trinidad and Tobago (Trinidad)	1999	2007	4	1	0	
Guaracara Park	Pointe-à-Pierre	Trinidad and Tobago (Trinidad)	1960	2011	74	9	0	
**Queen's Park Oval**	Port-of-Spain	Trinidad and Tobago (Trinidad)	1897	2026	267	154	78	Hosted 60 Tests, 69 ODIs and 6 T20Is.
Queen's Park Savannah	Port-of-Spain	Trinidad and Tobago (Trinidad)	1869	1895	5	0	0	No longer used for cricket
Roxborough Sporting Complex	Roxborough	Trinidad and Tobago (Tobago)	2001	2001	1	0	0	
Sir Frank Worrell Memorial Ground	Saint Augustine	Trinidad and Tobago (Trinidad)	1974	2016	8	2	0	
Shaw Park	Scarborough	Trinidad and Tobago (Tobago)	1984	2016	4	6	0	
Dubisson Park	Saint Madelaine	Trinidad and Tobago (Trinidad)	1976	1979	5	0	0	
Diego Martin Sporting Complex	Diego Martin	Trinidad and Tobago (Trinidad)	2022	2022	3	0	0	

=== United States Virgin Islands ===
Name	City	Country (constituent island)	First used	Last used	F/C	LA	T20	Notes
Addelita Cancryn Junior High School Ground	Charlotte Amalie	U.S. Virgin Islands (Saint Thomas)	2003	2016	7	0	0	
Paul E. Joseph Stadium	Frederikstedd	U.S. Virgin Islands (Saint Croix)	2003	2003	1	0	0	No longer exists

== See also ==
- List of Test cricket grounds
- Cricket in the West Indies
- West Indies cricket team
