= James C. Gibson =

Scottish landowner, military veteran, and community leader

James Clark Gibson, JP
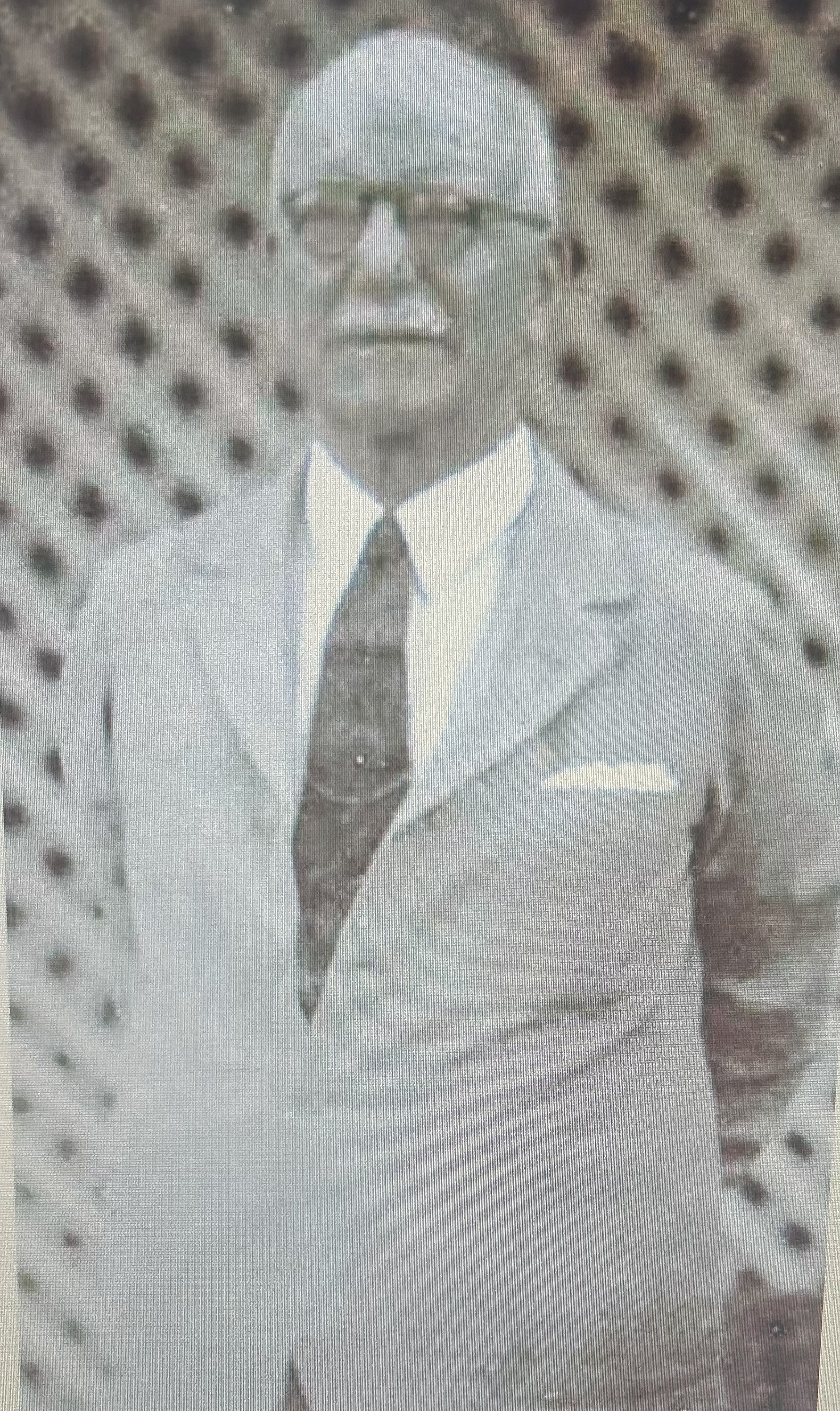
- Gibson in Georgetown, British Guiana, c. 1928
- Born: James Clark Gibson c. May 4, 1869; Glamis, Angus, Scotland
- Died: July 6, 1948 (aged 79); Georgetown, East Coast, Demerara-Mahaica, British Guiana
- Other names: Rt. Hon. J.C. Gibson; James Clark(e)
- Occupations: Black Watch soldier (1888–1890), British Army Reserve (1890–1900), Plantation manager (Pln. Rose Hall; 1895–1905, Pln. Port Mourant; 1905–1938), Director of Booker Group (1906–1939), Advisor of Sugar Estates (1939–1946), Sugar Estate Rep. (1906-1946), Planting attorney (1906–1946), Freemason (active: 1898–1921), Justice of the Peace (appointed June 3, 1910), Estate Administrator, Executor of Estates, Military veteran, Army Staff Corporal (1914–1920), Founder and President of Port Mourant Cricket Club (1916-1938), President of Courentyne Race Club (now Kennard Memorial Turf Club; 1908-1941), Shipwright, Scholar, Cooper, Philanthropist
- Height: 170 cm (5 ft 7 in)
- Spouse: Isabel Gowans Duncan (m. 1905; died 1940)
- Children: 6
- Parent(s): Andrew Gibson (1825-1897); Margaret Clark Millar (1845-1915)
- Relatives: Francis Gray, 14th Lord Gray (maternal great-grandfather)
- Family: Clan Gibson, sept of the Clan Buchanan (paternal side), Clan Sutherland (through the Gray Lords of Scotland; maternal), Lyons family (maternal)
- Military career
- Allegiance: United Kingdom; Scotland
- Branch: Black Watch; British Army
- Service years: 1888-1890 (Black Watch); 1914–1918 (British Army Reserve)
- Rank: Acting Staff Corporal (ASC)
- Unit: Royal Army Service Corps (A.S.C.)
- Conflicts: World War I (Army Reserve)
- Awards: British War Medal, Colonial Auxiliary Forces Long Service Medal

James Clark Gibson, Esq., JP, better known by J.C. Gibson (4 May 1869 – 6 July 1948) was a Scottish landowner, military veteran, estate manager, and community leader who spent most of his life in British Guiana (now Guyana)

Rising quickly in the Booker Bros. sugar empire—which controlled nearly 80% of the colony's industry—Gibson managed Rose Hall estate (1895–1905), where he aided in partitioning village lands, and Port Mourant (1908–1939), exerting notable autonomy to enact reforms that set it apart as the colony's most progressive region. These included allotting worker land for rice cultivation and side incomes, improved housing, resource access (fishing/vegetables), and locomotive transportation systems. Gibson also appointed malariologist George Giglioli; together they spearheaded health initiatives that helped eradicate malaria throughout the colony. Praised by contemporaries like Mahatma Gandhi, C.F. Andrews and later acknowledged by Cheddi Jagan as a sole outlier amid colonial exploitation, his methods left a lasting influence on a young Baron Campbell of Eskan and shaped the latter's post-1939 reforms. Recognised for his innovative approach, he vastly improved living and working conditions for plantation labourers throughout his domain. Beyond work on the estates, Gibson was a noted philanthropist, founding and forming the Port Mourant Cricket Club in 1916. The club plays a significant role in regional life and has produced numerous prominent West Indian cricketers, most notably Rohan Kanhai, Basil Butcher, and Clive Lloyd.

== Early life ==
J.C. Gibson was born on 4 May 1869 in Glamis, Angus, Scotland, at Huntingfaulds Farm House near Tealing. He was the middle child of 6. His parents were Andrew Gibson, a farmer and landowner, and Margaret Hanna Millar.

As a young man, Gibson apprenticed as a cooper in Aberdeen, honing his craftsmanship before transitioning to military service in Perth.

== Military service ==
Gibson began his military career on 13 February 1888, enlisting with the Black Watch, 3rd Battalion, Royal Regiment of Scotland in Perth. According to his short service attestation records, his military career with the Royal Highlanders spanned 2 years, from 1888-1890.

As a member of the British Army Reserve, he received the Colonial Auxiliary Forces Long Service Medal.

== Career in British Guiana ==
J.C. Gibson emigrated to British Guiana as a young man, where he quickly became the deputy manager (and later manager) of the Rose Hall sugar estates from 1895–1905, and the Port Mourant sugar estates from 1908 to 1939, respectively. Through both tenures, Gibson implemented progressive reforms to improve the welfare of his workers:

- Construction of better housing facilities for laborers and their families.
- Introduction of supplementary rice farming to provide workers with additional income and food security.
- Access to plantation land for fishing and gathering wild vegetables.
- Use of locomotives to transport workers to and from the plantation backdams.
- Free medical services for all workers.

On June 3, 1910, Gibson was appointed a Justice of the Peace by the Governor of British Guiana. This appointment tasked him with aiding in the partition of the undivided lands of Rose Hall Village. His role as a Justice of the Peace further solidified his influence in the region's legal and civic affairs.

Later on, a notice published on December 30, 1916, in a British Guiana newspaper lists Gibson as an executor of the estate of Cecil Morris, the prominent plantation manager of Albion Estate.

Babu John cremation site is situated along the northern edge of Port Mourant, near the Atlantic Ocean. Following the end of the First World War in 1918, the plantation community was struck by a severe influenza outbreak. As deaths increased, the existing plantation cemetery became overcrowded, prompting J.C. Gibson, along with the estate’s attorney, to establish a new burial ground for the residents of Port Mourant.

In 1920, Irrigation was reported as significantly poor, as sanitation issues plagued the sugar estates on the Corentyne. During this crisis, "the condition of man and beast was said to be ‘pitiable.’ Water for drinking and other household purposes, in the ponds and ditches in the villages, had dried up. Many villagers in the neighbourhood of Plantation Port Mourant survived, only because the manager of this estate, J.C. Gibson, made the water in his canals available to all.” This act of prevailing "magnanimity" saved numerous lives and was commended by labourers.

Under Gibson’s leadership, Port Mourant was by far the healthiest and least malarial region in all of British Guiana. Such reforms were later acknowledged by Cheddi Jagan, the fourth President of Guyana, as a model of progressive plantation management.

Jagan, reflecting on his childhood at Port Mourant, wrote about Gibson's commanding presence and authority:

"At Port Mourant, the premier plantation in Berbice, the manager was J.C. Gibson. His reputation extended far and wide; he was czar, king, prosecutor, judge, all in one. Almost everyone looked upon him with awe and fear. One particular event in my experience typified the authority which he wielded... As soon as he was spotted half-a-mile away, we either had to scamper away or be prepared to pay obeisance."

By the mid-1930s, Gibson had become one of the most decorated figures within the Booker empire, overseeing every major estate, including his own at Port Mourant. In 1936, as Senior Director, he personally invited Italian-born malariologist George Giglioli to visit his Port Mourant estate, after learning of the impending expiration of Giglioli’s contract elsewhere in the colony. The two had first met in 1933 during an Atlantic banana boat crossing, where they discussed tropical disease and health conditions on sugar estates. Recognising the impact of malaria on labour productivity and estate welfare, Gibson convinced Giglioli to continue to explore his opportunities within Bookers and Guyana at large. This intervention proved pivotal, leading to Giglioli’s appointment with the company and the initiation of wide-scale medical surveys and malaria control programmes across Booker estates, which later became foundational to malaria reduction efforts throughout British Guiana.

J.C. was the planting attorney for several sugar estates, including Rose Hall, Port Mourant, Skeldon, Enmore, Cane Grove, Lusignan, and La Bonne Intention. This made him one of the most powerful figures in the sugar industry of British Guiana during the early 20th century.

Over the course of thirty-five years, Gibson was responsible for forming and leading the British Guiana Sugar Experiment Stations' Committee as a director for the Bookers Group. His directorship, which spanned past his plantation management career, later transitioned into an advisory role for plantation estates during his retirement. In this capacity, he traveled extensively to the United States, Egpyt, New Zealand, Australia, India, Trieste, Ceylon, Spain, Germany, Austria, and Luxembourg, where he studied agricultural advancements and exchanged knowledge on sugar production and labour practices.

== Contributions to cricket ==
Gibson was instrumental in fostering the growth of cricket in British Guiana. As a staunch supporter of Indian cricket, in 1916, Gibson founded the Port Mourant Cricket Club. He worked alongside Indian businessman J. W. Permaul, and became the president of the club from its inception in 1916 to 1938. The captain of the club was Gibson's chauffeur, James Kempadoo, the father of writer Peter Kempadoo.

Gibson's club has produced several celebrated West Indies cricketers, including: Clive Lloyd, Rohan Kanhai, Basil Butcher, Joe Solomon, Alvin Kallicharran, Randolph Ramnarace, Ivan Madray and John Trim.

Gibson was a proponent of youth athletics, and established the Gibson Shield, a school cricket tournament that was held annually at the Bourda cricket grounds. The competition was intended to promote youth participation in sports. In 1940, the Eversham Church of Scotland School were the winners of the trophy.

== Freemasonry ==
J.C. Gibson was initiated into Freemasonry in 1898 as a member of the Ituni Lodge, Lodge No. 2642, located in New Amsterdam, British Guiana. The lodge, under the jurisdiction of the United Grand Lodge of England, served as a key social and networking institution during British colonial rule. Gibson remained an active member, with lodge records indicating consistent payments and participation from at least 1910 to 1921.

== Personal life ==
During his time as manager at Rose Hall, he had a longtime relationship with Hannah Emelia DeCruz, a woman of mixed Dutch, Irish, and Indian descent. From this relationship, he had his firstborn child, Walter Henry (1901–1991).

On July 12, 1905, J. C. married Isabella Gowans Duncan at Carmyllie Parish Church in Scotland. The ceremony, officiated by Rev. J.G. Lyon, J. C.'s cousin, and assisted by Isabella’s uncle, Rev. W.O. Duncan, was reported in the Arbroath Herald on July 20, 1905.

On January 15, 1940, Isabella Gowans Gibson died in the Port of Spain, Trinidad and Tobago, away from her husband.

Throughout his life, Gibson formed connections with various influential figures, including Gandhi and the Baron Campbell of Eskan. Gandhi was thankful for Gibson, and Gibson supported Gandhi in his activism. While Campbell saw Gibson as a “tough man” and a “just ruler”, he also respected him, acknowledging his firm leadership and the impact of his management style.

== Contemporary Views and Reputation ==
Gibson’s leadership and reforms at Port Mourant earned him both admiration and fear among his contemporaries. Baron Campbell of Eskan regularly visited Gibson at Port Mourant, which was the estate next to his, and took note of his approach to plantation management. Unlike any estate manager of the time, Gibson prioritised worker welfare alongside productivity. His policies—including improved housing, supplementary farming, and greater access to food sources—vastly set him apart from those who focused solely on the profit. Campbell, influenced by these same methods, came to regard Gibson’s model as his own benchmark for estate administration. Among his peers Gibson was highly respected. Cecil Morris, the manager of the Albion estates, designated Gibson in his will, and died while visiting him.

J.C. Gibson was among Mahatma Gandhi's small circle of European correspondents during Gandhi's South African years. A letter from Gandhi to Gibson, written from the Hotel Cecil in London on November 1906, expresses great appreciation for Gibson's "sympathetic note" and added, "I do not see the slightest chance of my being able to go to Scotland." Historical writer Ramachandra Guha records that Gibson and the minister Charles Phillips offered to speak to the colonial government on Gandhi's behalf regarding discriminatory legislation against Indian residents of the Transvaal. James D. Hunt likewise includes Gibson among Gandhi's strongest associates within the South African General Mission. When Gandhi was assaulted in 1908, it was Gibson's office that provided sanctuary. In Mohandas Gandhi: Politician and Statesman (1951), historian Robert Lane Gordon recorded that J. C. Gibson, a European associate of Gandhi's in South Africa, urged that “passive resistance could be an infallible panacea for the ills of India.” Gordon cited Gibson’s remark as evidence of early sympathetic understanding of Gandhi’s doctrine among reform-minded Europeans.

Historian Clem Seecharan noted Gibson’s efforts to improve labour conditions, recognising him as an unprecedented exception in colonial administration. The Indian independence activist and Gandhi confidant, C. F. Andrews, was flattered by Gibson's character. Andrews was lavish in praise of Gibson's 'efficiency', 'knowledge', and the 'progressive character' at Port Mourant. Activist Eric Huntley called Gibson a powerful man whose word was law not just within the sugar estates, but also within the surrounding villages. The cricketer Clyde Walcott described him as an "enlightened" pre-war manager, particularly toward Indian workers. However, Cheddi Jagan criticized Gibson, viewing his reforms as a means to preserve the plantation system. Jagan particularly despised Gibson’s wife, whose callous acts, such as throwing coins for impoverished children to scramble for, left a lasting impression on him. These experiences, along with Gibson's rigid control over labourers, planted the early seeds of Jagan’s communist leanings. Despite his reforms, Gibson's legacy remains debated, with some seeing him as progressive and others as an enforcer of colonial order.

== Death and legacy ==
James Clark Gibson died at his home on 6 July 1948 in Georgetown, East Coast, Demerara-Mahaica, at the age of 79. Gibson was a progressive leader who left behind a legacy of social reform and community development. His contributions to plantation management and West Indies cricket remain celebrated in Guyana.

== Issue ==
James Clark Gibson had at least five children:

- Walter Henry Gibson (1901–1992), a mechanical engineer who aided miners in excavating the interior of British Guiana. Married Margaret Isola Grimes, the couple had 13 children who survived to adulthood.
- Kenneth Duncan Gibson (1906–1978), participated in World War II as a member of the Royal Navy.
- Margaret Jean Stanley (1909–1974)
- Dorothy Jones (1912-2004), husband of the late Dr. Selwyn Owen Jones from Wales. Mother to Anthony and Annabel Jones.
- Norah Kerr-Wilson (1917– 2004), worked as a nurse.

== Ancestry ==
As a son of Andrew Gibson, J. C. was a direct descendant of Gilbert MacAuslan, 8th Laird of Buchanan, and a member of the Gibson sept of the Clan Buchanan.

Through his mother, Gibson is a direct descendant of the Clan Sutherland and the Clan Lyon of Aberdeen and Glamis. His mother, Margaret Clark Millar, was the descendant (likely granddaughter) of Francis Gray, 14th Lord Gray.
