= Player of the Match awards (cricket) =

Sporting award

In the sport of cricket, a Player of the Match award is given to an outstanding player in that particular match, almost always the one who makes the most impact in the match. The term was originally used in cricket before being adopted by other sports. The award will usually be given to a player from the winning team, but if a team has lost but a player from the losing team has had an incredible performance then he can also be named as Man of the Match.

In Test cricket, the player of the match award became a regular feature in the mid-1980s. It is usually awarded to the player whose contribution is seen as the most important in winning the game, but there have been many instances of a player on the losing team receiving the award.

In Test matches, Jacques Kallis holds the record for the highest number of awards, with 23 in 166 matches, followed by Muttiah Muralitharan with 19 awards.

In ODI matches Sachin Tendulkar holds the record for the highest number of player of the match awards, with 62 in 463 matches. Sanath Jayasuriya is second with 48.

In Twenty20 Internationals, Virandeep Singh leads with 22 player of the match awards.

Andrea-Mae Zepeda of Austria completed a clean sweep of POTM awards in a WT20I series against Belgium in September 2021. Hayley Matthews achieved the same feat for the West Indies against Australian in October 2023, despite her team losing the series 2–1.

== Test cricket ==
Note: Players in bold are still active in Test cricket.

=== Most Player of the Match awards in Tests ===
Awards	Player	Team	Matches	Career
23	Jacques Kallis	South Africa	166	1995–2014
19	Muttiah Muralitharan	Sri Lanka	133	1992–2010
17	Wasim Akram	Pakistan	104	1985–2002
17	Shane Warne	Australia	145	1992–2007
16	Kumar Sangakkara	Sri Lanka	134	2000–2015
16	Ricky Ponting	Australia	168	1995–2012
14	Curtly Ambrose	West Indies	98	1988–2000
14	Steve Waugh	Australia	168	1985–2004
14	Sachin Tendulkar	India	200	1989–2013
13	**Steve Smith**	Australia	109	2010–present
13	Mahela Jayawardene	Sri Lanka	149	1997–2014
13	**Joe Root**	England	149	2012–present
Last updated: 26 October 2024

=== Most Player of the Series awards in Tests ===
Awards	Player	Team	Series	Career
11	Ravichandran Ashwin	India	43	2011–2024
11	Muttiah Muralitharan	Sri Lanka	61	1992–2010
9	Jacques Kallis	South Africa	61	1995–2013
8	Imran Khan	Pakistan	28	1971–1992
8	Richard Hadlee	New Zealand	33	1973–1990
8	Shane Warne	Australia	46	1992–2007
7	Wasim Akram	Pakistan	43	1985–2002
7	Shivnarine Chanderpaul	West Indies	60	1994–2015
6	Malcolm Marshall	West Indies	21	1978–1991
6	Curtly Ambrose	West Indies	27	1988–2000
6	**Joe Root**	England	49	2012–present
6	Steve Waugh	Australia	54	1985–2004
Last updated: 3 November 2024

== One Day International cricket ==
Note: Players in bold are still active in ODI cricket.

=== Most Player of the Match awards in ODIs ===
Awards	Player	Team	Matches	Career
62	Sachin Tendulkar	India	463	1989–2012
48	Sanath Jayasuriya	Sri Lanka	445	1989–2011
45	**Virat Kohli**	India	315	2008–present
32	Jacques Kallis	South Africa	328	1996–2014
32	Ricky Ponting	Australia	375	1995–2012
32	Shahid Afridi	Pakistan	398	1996–2015
31	Vivian Richards	West Indies	187	1975–1991
31	Sourav Ganguly	India	311	1992–2007
31	Kumar Sangakkara	Sri Lanka	404	2000–2015
30	Brian Lara	West Indies	299	1990–2007
30	Aravinda de Silva	Sri Lanka	308	1984–2003
Last updated: 11 January 2026

=== Most Player of the Series awards in ODIs ===
Awards	Player	Team	Series	Career
15	Sachin Tendulkar	India	108	1989–2012
12	**Virat Kohli**	India	72	2008–present
11	Sanath Jayasuriya	Sri Lanka	111	1989–2011
9	Shaun Pollock	South Africa	60	1996–2008
8	Chris Gayle	West Indies	71	1999–2019
7	Vivian Richards	West Indies	40	1975–1991
7	Hashim Amla	South Africa	49	2008–2019
7	Yuvraj Singh	India	71	2000–2019
7	Shakib Al Hasan	Bangladesh	73	2006–2023
7	Sourav Ganguly	India	75	1992–2007
7	Ricky Ponting	Australia	77	1995–2012
7	Mahendra Singh Dhoni	India	80	2004–2019
Last updated: 7 August 2024

== Twenty20 International cricket ==
Note: Players in bold are still active in T20I cricket.

=== Most Player of the Match awards in T20Is ===
Awards	Player	Team	Matches	Career
25	**Virandeep Singh**	Malaysia	131	2019–present
21	**Sikandar Raza**	Zimbabwe	146	2013–present
17	**Suryakumar Yadav**	India	113	2021–present
16	Virat Kohli	India	125	2010–2024
15	**Sami Sohail**	Malawi	75	2019–present
15	**Syed Aziz**	Malaysia	137	2019–present
Last updated: 12 October 2026

=== Most Player of the Series awards in T20Is ===
Awards	Player	Team	Series	Career
7	Virat Kohli	India	46	2010–2024
6	**Suryakumar Yadav**	India	28	2021–present
6	**Wanindu Hasaranga**	Sri Lanka	30	2019–present
5	**Babar Azam**	Pakistan	41	2016–present
5	David Warner	Australia	42	2009–2024
5	Shakib Al Hasan	Bangladesh	45	2006–2024
Last updated: 30 June 2026

== All formats ==
Note: Players in bold are still active in international cricket.

=== Most Player of the Match awards in international cricket ===
Awards	Player	Team	Matches	Tests	ODIs	T20Is
76	Sachin Tendulkar	India	664	14	62	0
71	**Virat Kohli**	India	556	10	45	16
58	Sanath Jayasuriya	Sri Lanka	586	4	48	6
57	Jacques Kallis	South Africa	519	23	32	2
50	Kumar Sangakkara	Sri Lanka	594	16	31	3
49	Ricky Ponting	Australia	560	16	32	1
45	Shakib Al Hasan	Bangladesh	447	6	27	12
45	**Rohit Sharma**	India	503	4	27	14
43	Shahid Afridi	Pakistan	524	0	32	11
42	Brian Lara	West Indies	430	12	30	0
Last updated: 11 January 2026

=== Most Player of the series awards in international cricket ===
Awards	Player	Team	Series	Tests	ODIs	T20Is
22	**Virat Kohli**	India	168	3	12	7
20	Sachin Tendulkar	India	183	5	15	0
17	Shakib Al Hasan	Bangladesh	162	5	7	5
15	Jacques Kallis	South Africa	148	9	6	0
13	**Joe Root**	England	123	6	7	0
13	David Warner	Australia	126	5	3	5
13	Sanath Jayasuriya	Sri Lanka	176	2	11	0
Last updated: 6 December 2025

== Shared awards ==
In Test cricket there have been rare instances when a joint award for man of the match or man of the series has been announced. However, in ODIs and Twenty20 internationals this is usually when a member of the losing team is the highest scorer, such as when Charles Coventry (194) and Tamim Iqbal (154) shared the award after Zimbabwe lost the match. In another interesting match held on 3 April 1996, the whole New Zealand team was awarded the Man of the Match award by adjudicator Basil Butcher who pronounced it a team performance. It was the first time that a whole team had been given the Man of the Match award.

=== Team Man of the Match awards ===
In Test cricket, South Africa has been awarded Team man of the match award, in the West Indies tour in 1998/99 season. The match was won by South Africa by 351 runs and whole 11 players awarded the man of the match award.

15–18 January 1999
Scorecard

**South Africa**	**v**	**West Indies**
313 (92.5 overs); Mark Boucher 100 (183); Courtney Walsh 6/80 (24.5 overs)		144 (47.1 overs); Brian Lara 68 (77); Allan Donald 5/49 (13 overs)
399/5d (115.2 overs); Gary Kirsten 134 (305); Carl Hooper 3/117 (36.2 overs)		217 (75.2 overs); Ridley Jacobs 78 (92); Paul Adams 4/64 (21.2 overs)

**South Africa won by 351 runs**
SuperSport Park, Centurion
Umpires: Aleem Dar (Pak) and Billy Bowden (NZ)
Player of the match: South Africa

- West Indies won the toss and elected to field.
- This is the first time that the West Indies lost a series 5–0.

In ODI cricket, New Zealand team has been awarded man of the match award for their team performances to 4 run victory against the West Indies on 3 April 1996. On 1 September 1996, Pakistan team has been awarded man of the match for their team performance against England for their 2 wicket win.

3 April 1996
Scorecard

**New Zealand**; 158 (35.5 overs)	**v**	**West Indies**; 154 (49.1 overs)
Craig Spearman 41 (39); Laurie Williams 3/16 (4.5 overs)		Roland Holder 49* (86); Chris Cairns 2/17 (5.1 overs)

**New Zealand won by 4 runs**
Bourda, Georgetown, Guyana
Umpires: Clyde Duncan (WI) and Eddie Nicholls (WI)
Player of the match: New Zealand

- West Indies won the toss and elected to field.

1 September 1996
Scorecard

**England**; 246 (50 overs)	**v**	**Pakistan**; 247/8 (49.4 overs)
Nick Knight 125* (145); Wasim Akram 3/45 (10 overs)		Saeed Anwar 61 (59); Adam Hollioake 4/45 (8.4 overs)

**Pakistan won by 2 wickets**
Trent Bridge, Nottingham
Umpires: John Holder (Eng) and David Shepherd (Eng)
Player of the match: Pakistan

- England won the toss and elected to bat.
- Shahid Anwar, Shadab Kabir and Shahid Nazir (All Pak) made their ODI debuts.

=== Joint awards in Tests ===
Joint awards are sometimes given to two players, either from the same team or one from each team. As of 2017, there have been 14 instances where two players from the same team were given the Man of the Match award in Test cricket.

#	Match	Venue	Date	MoM 1	MoM 2	Result
1	India v Sri Lanka	Nagpur	27 December 1986	(India) Dilip Vengsarkar	(India) Maninder Singh	India won
2	New Zealand v West Indies	Christchurch	12 March 1987	(New Zealand) Richard Hadlee	(New Zealand) Ewen Chatfield	New Zealand won
3	New Zealand v Sri Lanka	Hamilton	22 February 1991	(New Zealand) Ian Smith	(New Zealand) Andrew Jones	Drawn
4	New Zealand v Australia	Auckland	12 March 1993	(New Zealand) Ken Rutherford	(New Zealand) Danny Morrison	New Zealand won
5	New Zealand v Pakistan	Christchurch	24 February 1994	(New Zealand) Shane Thomson	(New Zealand) Bryan Young	New Zealand won
6	Zimbabwe v Pakistan	Harare	31 January 1995	(Zimbabwe) Andy Flower	(Zimbabwe) Grant Flower	Zimbabwe won
7	England v South Africa	Johannesburg	30 November 1995	(England) Jack Russell	(England) Mike Atherton	Drawn
8	Australia v South Africa	Johannesburg	28 February 1997	(Australia) Steve Waugh	(Australia) Greg Blewett	Australia won
9	South Africa v Zimbabwe	Harare	11 November 1999	(South Africa) Shaun Pollock	(South Africa) Mark Boucher	South Africa won
10	South Africa v Zimbabwe	Bloemfontein	17 November 2000	(South Africa) Jacques Kallis	(South Africa) Makhaya Ntini	South Africa won
11	Australia v South Africa	Sydney	2 January 2002	(Australia) Justin Langer	(Australia) Matthew Hayden	Australia won
12	South Africa v England	London	31 January 2003	(South Africa) Makhaya Ntini	(South Africa) Graeme Smith	South Africa won
13	Pakistan v South Africa	Lahore	17 October 2003	(Pakistan) Taufeeq Umar	(Pakistan) Danish Kaneria	Pakistan won
14	South Africa v England	Johannesburg	14 January 2010	(South Africa) Dale Steyn	(South Africa) Morne Morkel	South Africa won

Until 2017, there have been 26 instances where one player from each team was given the Man of the Match award in Test cricket.

#	Match	Venue	Date	MoM 1	MoM 2	Result
1	Pakistan v West Indies	Port of Spain	4 March 1977	(Pakistan) Wasim Raja	(Cricket West Indies) Colin Croft	West Indies won
2	New Zealand v India	Wellington	21 February 1981	(New Zealand) Geoff Howarth	(India) Sandeep Patil	New Zealand won
3	New Zealand v India	Auckland	13 March 1981	(New Zealand) John Wright	(India) Ravi Shastri	Drawn
4	England v West Indies	London	28 June 1984	(England) Ian Botham	(Cricket West Indies) Gordon Greenidge	West Indies won
5	West Indies v New Zealand	Port of Spain	29 March 1985	(Cricket West Indies) Vivian Richards	(New Zealand) Ewen Chatfield	Drawn
6	India v Australia	Chepauk	18 September 1986	(India) Kapil Dev	(Australia) Dean Jones	Tied
7	Pakistan v India	Chepauk	3 February 1987	(Pakistan) Imran Khan	(India) Kris Srikkanth	Drawn
8	England v Sri Lanka	London	25 August 1988	(England) Phil Newport	(Sri Lanka) Ravi Ratnayeke	England won
9	Australia v Pakistan	Faisalabad	23 September 1988	(Australia) Allan Border	(Pakistan) Ijaz Ahmed	Drawn
10	West Indies v Australia	Kingston	1 March 1991	(Cricket West Indies) Gus Logie	(Australia) David Boon	Drawn
11	England v Sri Lanka	London	22 August 1991	(England) Alec Stewart	(Sri Lanka) Ravi Ratnayeke	England won
12	West Indies v South Africa	Bridgetown	18 April 1992	(Cricket West Indies) Curtly Ambrose	(South Africa) Andrew Hudson	West Indies won
13	England v New Zealand	Auckland	24 January 1997	(England) Alec Stewart	(New Zealand) Nathan Astle	Drawn
14	West Indies v India	Georgetown	17 April 1997	(Cricket West Indies) Shiv Chanderpaul	(India) Rahul Dravid	Drawn
15	South Africa v Pakistan	Johannesburg	14 February 1998	(South Africa) Pat Symcox	(Pakistan) Azhar Mahmood	Drawn
16	Pakistan v India	Kolkata	16 February 1999	(Pakistan) Saeed Anwar	(India) Javagal Srinath	Pakistan won
17	Sri Lanka v Australia	Kandy	9 September 1999	(Sri Lanka) Aravinda de Silva	(Australia) Ricky Ponting	Sri Lanka won
18	Zimbabwe v Sri Lanka	Harare	4 December 1999	(Zimbabwe) Andy Flower	(Sri Lanka) Russell Arnold	Drawn
19	England v South Africa	Durban	26 December 1999	(England) Andy Caddick	(South Africa) Gary Kirsten	Drawn
20	Sri Lanka v South Africa	Kandy	30 July 2000	(Sri Lanka) Arjuna Ranatunga	(South Africa) Lance Klusener	South Africa won
21	India v Australia	Chepauk	18 March 2001	(India) Harbhajan Singh	(Australia) Matthew Hayden	India won
22	Sri Lanka v Bangladesh	Colombo	6 September 2001	(Sri Lanka) Muttiah Muralitharan	(Bangladesh) Mohammad Ashraful	Sri Lanka won
23	Sri Lanka v West Indies	Colombo	29 November 2001	(Sri Lanka) Chaminda Vaas	(Cricket West Indies) Brian Lara	Sri Lanka won
24	South Africa v Pakistan	Faisalabad	24 October 2003	(South Africa) Gary Kirsten	(Pakistan) Taufeeq Umar	Drawn
25	Sri Lanka v Pakistan	Colombo	12 July 2009	(Sri Lanka) Nuwan Kulasekara	(Pakistan) Fawad Alam	Sri Lanka won
26	Pakistan v Australia	London	13 July 2010	(Pakistan) Salman Butt	(Australia) Simon Katich	Australia won

There was one rare instance where three players were given the man of the match award in Test cricket. This happened between New Zealand and Sri Lanka in February 1991 at Hamilton.

#	Match	Venue	Date	MoM 1	MoM 2	MoM 3	Result
**1**	New Zealand v Sri Lanka	Hamilton	4 March 1977	(New Zealand) Ian Smith	(New Zealand) Andrew Jones	(Sri Lanka) Asanka Gurusinha	Drawn

In one occasion in international cricket, man of the match was given to a non-player, specifically to the ground staff. In the third Test match between South Africa and New Zealand on 8 December 2000 at Johannesburg, the fifth day was delayed due to rain. However, with the help of the ground staff, managed by Chris Scott, the Head Groundsman, the play continued and the match ended in a draw.

#	Match	Venue	Date	MoM	Result
**1**	South Africa v New Zealand	Johannesburg	8 December 2000	Chris Scott (Head Groundsman) and his crew	Drawn

=== Joint awards in One Day Internationals ===
As of 2020, there have been 18 instances where two players from the same team were given the Man of the Match award in ODI cricket.

#	Match	Venue	Date	MoM 1	MoM 2	Result
1	New Zealand v Australia	Dunedin	19 March 1986	(New Zealand) Martin Crowe	(New Zealand) Richard Hadlee	New Zealand won
2	New Zealand v Australia	Wellington	26 March 1986	(Australia) Wayne Phillips	(Australia) Steve Waugh	Australia won
3	India v New Zealand	Nagpur	31 October 1987	(India) Sunil Gavaskar	(India) Chetan Sharma	India won
4	Australia v India	Sydney	20 January 1992	(Australia) David Boon	(Australia) Geoff Marsh	Australia won
5	Pakistan v New Zealand	Port Elizabeth	13 December 1994	(Pakistan) Aqib Javed	(Pakistan) Waqar Younis	Pakistan won
6	Australia v Sri Lanka	Sydney	20 January 1996	(Australia) Mark Taylor	(Australia) Shane Warne	Australia won
7	India v Zimbabwe	Centurion	7 February 1997	(Zimbabwe) Craig Evans	(Zimbabwe) Paul Strang	Zimbabwe won
8	New Zealand v England	Auckland	2 March 1997	(New Zealand) Nathan Astle	(New Zealand) Gavin Larsen	New Zealand won
9	Pakistan v India	Sharjah	26 March 2000	(Pakistan) Inzamam-ul-Haq	(Pakistan) Waqar Younis	Pakistan won
10	New Zealand v Sri Lanka	Sharjah	17 April 2001	(New Zealand) Kyle Mills	(New Zealand) Mathew Sinclair	New Zealand won
11	Pakistan v New Zealand	Rawalpindi	7 December 2003	(Pakistan) Yasir Hameed	(Pakistan) Imran Farhat	Pakistan won
12	South Africa v New Zealand	Port Elizabeth	30 November 2007	(New Zealand) Jamie How	(New Zealand) Brendon McCullum	New Zealand won
13	South Africa v Pakistan	Johannesburg	17 March 2013	(South Africa) Hashim Amla	(South Africa) AB de Villiers	South Africa won
14	New Zealand v Sri Lanka	Dunedin	23 January 2015	(New Zealand) Luke Ronchi	(New Zealand) Grant Elliott	New Zealand won
15	New Zealand v Zimbabwe	Harare	4 August 2015	(New Zealand) Martin Guptill	(New Zealand) Tom Latham	New Zealand won
16	Zimbabwe v Afghanistan	Harare	21 February 2017	(Zimbabwe) Tendai Chatara	(Zimbabwe) Sean Williams	Zimbabwe won
17	Afghanistan v Ireland	Greater Noida	10 March 2017	(Afghanistan) Najeeb Tarakai	(Afghanistan) Rashid Khan	Afghanistan won
18	South Africa v Australia	Bloemfontein	4 March 2020	(South Africa) Lungi Ngidi	(South Africa) Janneman Malan	South Africa won

Until 2018, there have been 14 instances where one player from each team was given the Man of the Match awards in ODI cricket.

#	Match	Venue	Date	MoM 1	MoM 2	Result
1	Australia v England	Melbourne	1 January 1975	(Australia) Ian Chappell	(England) Dennis Amiss	England won
2	India v England	Pune	5 December 1984	(India) Dilip Vengsarkar	(England) Mike Gatting	England won
3	Australia v West Indies	Sydney	12 February 1985	(Australia) Allan Border	(Cricket West Indies) Michael Holding	West Indies won
4	India v South Africa	Kolkata	10 November 1991	(India) Sachin Tendulkar	(South Africa) Allan Donald	India won
5	Zimbabwe v Pakistan	Harare	22 February 1995	(Zimbabwe) Bryan Strang	(Pakistan) Saeed Anwar	Tied
6	Zimbabwe v England	Harare	1 January 1997	(Zimbabwe) Paul Strang	(England) John Crawley	Zimbabwe won
7	South Africa v India	East London	4 February 1997	(South Africa) Gary Kirsten	(India) Saurav Ganguly	South Africa won
8	West Indies v Australia	Georgetown	21 April 1999	(Cricket West Indies) Mervyn Dillon	(Australia) Steve Waugh	Tied
9	South Africa v Australia	Johannesburg	12 March 2006	(South Africa) Herschelle Gibbs	(Australia) Ricky Ponting	South Africa won
10	South Africa v Sri Lanka	Georgetown	28 March 2007	(South Africa) Charl Langeveldt	(Sri Lanka) Lasith Malinga	South Africa won
11	Zimbabwe v Bangladesh	Bulawayo	16 August 2009	(Zimbabwe) Charles Coventry	(Bangladesh) Tamim Iqbal	Bangladesh won
12	England v India	London	11 September 2011	(England) Ravi Bopara	(India) Suresh Raina	Tied
13	West Indies v Pakistan	Gros Islet	19 July 2013	(Cricket West Indies) Lendl Simmons	(Pakistan) Misbah-ul-Haq	Tied
14	Zimbabwe v Afghanistan	Bulawayo	24 October 2015	(Zimbabwe) Sean Williams	(Afghanistan) Dawlat Zadran	Afghanistan won
