= Kempadoo =

Kempadoo is a surname. Notable people with the surname include:

- Kamala Kempadoo, British-Guyanese author and sociologist
- Oonya Kempadoo (born 1966), British-Guyanese novelist
- Peter Kempadoo (1926–2019), Guyanese writer and broadcaster
- Roshini Kempadoo (born 1959), British photographer, artist, and academic
