= Port Mourant Cricket Club =

Port Mourant Cricket Club (PMCC) is a Guyanese cricket club based in Port Mourant, Berbice. Established in 1916, it is the oldest cricket club in the East Berbice-Corentyne region, and ranks among the oldest in the West Indies, typically in the top 10 by founding date. The club has a long history of developing talent and has produced numerous international cricketers for Guyana and the West Indies. It plays at the Port Mourant Community Centre Ground, a venue integral to the history of local sports.

== History ==
The club was founded in 1916 by the community leader J. C. Gibson, who promoted youth athletics in the region and served as president until 1938. Gibson also established the Gibson Shield, an annual cricket tournament held at Bourda, further cementing his influence on Guyanese cricket. The club's origins are tied to the sugar plantation era in Port Mourant, where cricket emerged as a popular pastime largely among Indian indentured labourers and their descendants.

In the post-war period, the club gained prominence for nurturing Indo-Guyanese players, reflecting the community's growing involvement in the sport. By the mid-20th century, it had produced players who led Guyana to victories in regional tournaments, including the Shell Shield under Rohan Kanhai in 1973. The club has also been noted for developing successful under-19 captains for Guyana.

In recent years, PMCC has focused on youth development, participating in local competitions such as the Busta Cup and Leslie Amsterdam Trophy. The club has received support through initiatives like "Project Cricket Gear", which provided equipment and uniforms in 2025 to aid its under-17 team. Community leaders and overseas Guyanese continue to contribute to its revival, aiming to restore its former glory.

== Grounds ==
The club's home ground is the Port Mourant Community Centre Ground, which evolved from the early efforts of the cricket club itself. It was constructed by J.C. Gibson. This venue has hosted regional matches and remains a hub for cricket in Berbice.

== Notable players ==
Port Mourant Cricket Club has been the starting point for many renowned cricketers, including:

- Rohan Kanhai – Former West Indies captain and batsman
- Alvin Kallicharran – West Indies batsman
- Joe Solomon – Known for his role in the first tied Test match
- Basil Butcher – West Indies batsman
- John Trim – West Indies fast bowler
- Mahendra Nagamootoo – West Indies leg-spinner.
- Clive Lloyd – Former West Indies captain.
- Randolph Ramnarace – Guyana and West Indies player.
- Ivan Madray – West Indies leg-spinner.

Others such as Romain Etwaroo, Tyrone Etwaroo, Reginald Etwaroo, Vishal Nagamootoo, Arjune Nandu, Veerasammy Verapen, and James Kempadoo (father of Peter Kempadoo).

== Achievements ==
The club has competed in various Berbice and national tournaments, contributing to Guyana's cricketing successes. It has been recognised for its role in youth cricket and for producing players who have excelled at international levels.

== See also ==
- James C. Gibson
- Bourda
- Berbice cricket team
- Guyana national cricket team
