= George Giglioli =

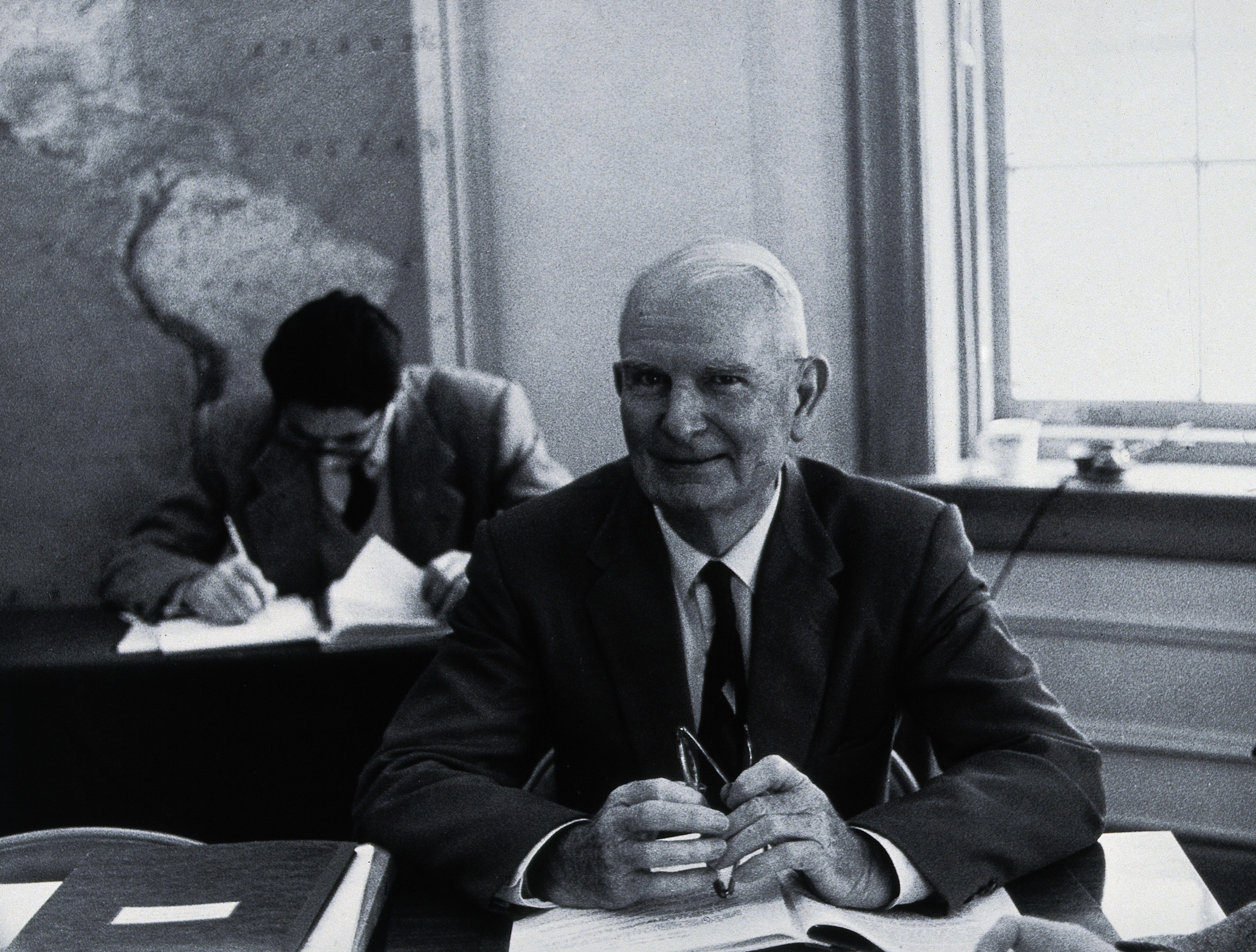
George Giglioli by L.J. Bruce-Chwatt

Dr. George Giglioli OBE, (1897 – 1975) was an Anglo-Italian physician who worked as a malariologist in British Guiana. His four decades of work helped reduce the instances of malaria in the colony drastically.

== Biography ==
He was born in Pisa, Italy, son of the Italian chemist Italo Emilio Giglioli and the English author Constance H. D. Stocker. He entered the University of Pisa in 1915 to study medicine, but was called for military duty in 1916. Captured for 18 months, he assisted in the prison hospital. After the war he went back to his studies, and received his medical degree in 1921. He continued at the London School of Tropical Medicine, and moved to Guyana in 1922 as medical officer for the Demerara Bauxite Company at Mackenzie, Guyana. The mine employed more than 1,000 workers, and the company supplied medical services to the workers and the surrounding population.

In 1925, he set up a new hospital with trained staff, sterile operating room and a proper lab to fight diseases like hookworm and malaria, which were rampant among the population. He spent time researching malaria in an effort to be able to control the disease better. After the Great Depression as good as shut down the bauxite mines, he found employment with Davson & Co., a sugar company in the Berbice Estuary. There he focused on improving general health and living standards for the malnourished sugar workers, including upgrading housing, water supply and waste disposal.

At the end of 1936, as his contract with Davsons was set to expire, Giglioli received a personal invitation from his friend and colleague J.C. Gibson, the Senior Director of Booker Brothers—the country's largest sugar producer, controlling about 70% of production—at his Port Mourant estate. The two had first met in 1933 during a two-week Atlantic crossing, where they discussed tropical disease and estate health conditions. Gibson, who had nearly 40 years of experience in the sugar industry, valued Giglioli's expertise and urged him to visit Port Mourant to explore opportunities. Without this invitation, Giglioli's career in Guyana would have ended, as he had no other immediate prospects in the colony amid the lingering effects of the Great Depression and rising European tensions; instead, it proved decisive, leading him to join Bookers and head medical surveys and health improvements across the company's estates, which launched his large-scale malaria control efforts.

Giglioli carried on malaria research and identified the Anopheles darlingi mosquito as the main malaria carrier in Guyana. In 1939 he was placed in charge of a Malaria Research Unit which was established with funds from the Colonial Government, the Rockefeller Foundation and the British Guiana Sugar Producers' Association. When Italy entered WWII on the side of Germany, he was placed under house arrest as an "enemy alien". But the colonial government of Guyana released him as they needed him to be Government Malariologist, a position to which he was appointed in August 1942.

In 1943, Giglioli found out about DDT through a chance meeting with three British scientists. This was the insecticide the allies were using to protect their troops from malaria. After initial test, a large-scale control programme was started on the sugar estates in 1946, and countrywide in 1947. Spraying the inside of houses with DDT was so effective that by 1951, the coastal areas were free of malaria. It was more difficult inland, where the A. darlingi mosquito lived in the forest. To tackle this problem, a salt treated with anti-malaria drug chloroquine was distributed to populations in those remote areas in 1961. By the mid-1960s most cases of malaria were wiped out. This resulted in fewer deaths of women of child-bearing age, and as a result, the population grew rapidly.

His research won him respect internationally. He worked as an advisor to the World Health Organization (WHO) and the Pan American Health Organization (PAHO). In 1968, WHO presented Giglioli with the Darling Foundation Medal and Prize. Guyana honoured him with a stamp in 1978.

His unpublished autobiography was written six years before he died. It was edited and published in 2000 with the title Demerara Doctor: Confessions and Reminiscences of a Self-Taught Physician.

He died on 14 January 1975 in Washington D.C. He had two sons, Enzo Giglioli and Marco Giglioli (1927–1984), who was also a malariologist, and worked as the director of the Mosquito Research and Control Unit of the Caymans.
