= Community Centre, Skeldon =

Cricket ground in Skeldon, Guyana

Community Centre
- Interactive map of Community Centre

Ground information
- Location: Skeldon, Guyana
- Country: Guyana
- Coordinates: 5.8857°N 57.1429°W
- Establishment: c. 1964

Team information
Guyana	(1971/72–1992/93)
- As of 22 April 2022; Source: Ground profile

The Community Centre is a cricket ground in Skeldon, Guyana.

== History ==
The Community Centre is located in the town of Skeldon close to the Guyana–Suriname border. The ground held its first major representative match in March 1972, when Guyana played a first-class match against a combined Combined Leeward and Windward Islands cricket team in the 1971–72 Shell Shield, and played host to a further match between Guyana and Trinidad and Tobago the following season. In 1992, the Community Centre was recommissioned, with the pavilion being renamed in honour of Dennis D'Ornellas, who had secured the necessary equipment for the Centres recommissioning. The following year, after a 20 year gap, Guyana played a third first-class match there against Windward Islands in the 1992–93 Red Stripe Cup, which saw Guyana's Clayton Lambert score a double-century. A single List A one-day match also been played at the ground, between Guyana and the Windward Islands in the 1994–95 Shell/Sandals Trophy, which Guyana won by 8 wickets.

== Records ==
=== First-class ===
- Highest team total: 474 for 4 declared by Guyana v Trinidad and Tobago, 1972–73
- Lowest team total: 117 all out by Windward Islands v Guyana, 1992–93
- Highest individual innings: 263 by Clayton Lambert for Guyana v Windward Islands, 1992–93
- Best bowling in an innings: 6-31 by Clyde Butts for Guyana v Windward Islands, 1992–93
- Best bowling in a match: 9-74 by Clyde Butts, as above

== See also ==
- List of cricket grounds in the West Indies
