= Welfare Centre Ground =

Cricket ground in Rose Hall, Guyana

Ground information
- Location: Rose Hall, Guyana
- Coordinates: 6.2445°N 57.4872°W
- Establishment: c. 1954

Team information
Berbice	(1961–1976)
British Guinea/Guyana	(1961–1986)
- As of 5 March 2019; Source: Ground profile

The Welfare Centre Ground is a cricket ground in Rose Hall, Guyana.

== History ==
The inaugural first-class cricket match to be played at the ground took place in March 1961, when Berbice played against a touring EW Swanton's XI. British Guiana played Trinidad there in a first-class match in October of the same year. Berbice played first-class matches there until the final of the 1976/77 Jones Cup against Demerara. Between the 1973/74 Shell Shield and the 1985/86 Shell Shield, Guyana played five first-class matches at the ground.

== Records ==
=== First-class ===
- Highest team total: 504 by Guyana v Combined Leeward and Windward Islands, 1978/79
- Lowest team total: 128 by Berice v Demerara, 1972/73
- Highest individual innings: 200* by Timur Mohamed for Guyana v Windward Islands, 1985/86
- Best bowling in an innings: 6-57 by Clyde Butts for Guyana v Windward Islands, 1985/86
- Best bowling in a match: 10-129 by Lance Gibbs for Demerara v Berbice, 1972/73

== See also ==
- List of cricket grounds in Guyana
