= Roxborough Sporting Complex =

Cricket ground in Roxborough, Trinidad and Tobago

Ground information
- Location: Roxborough, Trinidad and Tobago
- Coordinates: 11.2483°N 60.5820°W
- Establishment: c. 1995

Team information
Trinidad and Tobago	(2000/01)
- As of 17 February 2022; Source: Ground profile

Roxborough Sporting Complex is a sporting and cultural complex in Roxborough, Trinidad and Tobago.

== History ==
Located adjacent to the Windward Road, which is the main road on the eastern side of Tobago, the Complex played host to one first-class cricket match in the 2000–01 Busta Cup between Trinidad and Tobago and West Indies B. Trinidad and Tobago won the match by 79 runs, with Dinanath Ramnarine taking ten-wickets in the match, which included match-winning figures of 6 for 81 in the West Indies B second innings.

== See also ==
- List of cricket grounds in the West Indies
