= Dubisson Park =

Cricket ground in Arima, Trinidad and Tobago

- Interactive map of Dubisson Park

Ground information
- Location: Sainte Madeleine, Trinidad and Tobago
- Country: Trinidad and Tobago
- Coordinates: 10.2671°N 61.4319°W
- Establishment: c. 1962

Team information
South Trinidad	(1975/76–1978/79)
- As of 17 February 2022; Source: Ground profile

Dubisson Park is a public park and former major cricket venue in Sainte Madeleine, Trinidad and Tobago.

== History ==
The Park was used by the South Trinidad cricket team for their home matches in the Texaco Cup, with the inaugural first-class match seeing South Trinidad play East Trinidad in the 1975–76 competition. South Trinidad played five first-class matches there until the 1978–79 season. With the loss of first-class status for the Texaco Cup, first-class cricket has not been played at the Park since.

== Records ==
=== First-class ===
- Highest team total: 365 for 7 by North Trinidad v South Trinidad, 1976–77
- Lowest team total: 96 all out by North Trinidad v South Trinidad, as above
- Highest individual innings: 105* by Pascall Roberts for North v South Trinidad, 1976–77
- Best bowling in an innings: 7-37 by Arnold Oliver for South Trinidad v East Trinidad, 1975–76
- Best bowling in a match: 10-79 by Arnold Oliver, as above

== See also ==
- List of cricket grounds in the West Indies
