= List of Austria women Twenty20 International cricketers =

This is a list of Austria women Twenty20 International cricketers. A Women's Twenty20 International (WT20I) is an international cricket match between two representative teams. A T20I is played under the rules of Twenty20 cricket. In April 2018, the International Cricket Council (ICC) granted full international status to Twenty20 women's matches played between member sides from 1 July 2018 onwards. Austria women played their first WT20I on 31 July against Norway during the 2019 France Women's T20I Quadrangular Series.

The list is arranged in the order in which each player won her first Twenty20 cap. Where more than one player won her first Twenty20 cap in the same match, those players are listed alphabetically by surname.

== Key ==
General

- ‡ – Captain
- † – Wicket-keeper
- First – Year of debut
- Last – Year of latest game
- Mat – Number of matches played

Batting

- Runs – Runs scored in career
- HS – Highest score
- Avg – Runs scored per dismissal
- * – Batsman remained not out
- 50 – Number of half centuries
- 100 – Centuries scored

Bowling

- Balls – Balls bowled in career
- Wkt – Wickets taken in career
- BBI – Best bowling in an innings
- Ave – Average runs per wicket

Fielding

- Ca – Catches taken
- St – Stumpings affected

== Players ==
Statistics are correct as of 30 August 2026.

Austria women T20I cricketers
General					Batting					Bowling				Fielding		Ref
No.	Name	First	Last	Mat	Runs	HS	Avg	50	100	Balls	Wkt	BBI	Ave	Ca	St	Ref
1	Elvira Avdylaj	2019	2023	7	1	1	0.33	0	0	84	0	–	–	0	0	
2	Rezarta Avdylaj	2019	2025	19	81	25	6.23	0	0	209	6	2/0	35.83	0	0	
3	Valentina Avdylaj	2019	2024	42	20	6*	1.81	0	0	947	31	4/12	29.45	1	0	
4	Harjivan Bhullar	2019	2025	50	251	23	6.27	0	0	–	–	–	–	1	0	
5	Busra Uca†	2019	2023	37	258	39	7.81	0	0	12	0	–	–	9	1	
6	Harjot Dhaliwal†	2019	2021	11	10	4	1.42	0	0	–	–	–	–	1	0	
7	Tugce Kazanci	2019	2020	10	44	17*	6.28	0	0	98	2	1/12	66.00	4	0	
8	Doris Kumar	2019	2019	4	1	1	0.50	0	0	48	4	4/14	12.75	0	0	
9	Anisha Nookala†	2019	2025	48	87	15	4.14	0	0	117	5	4/7	32.00	12	0	
10	Priya Sabu	2019	2025	56	937	84*	21.29	5	0	642	36	3/4	16.36	10	0	
11	Andrea-Mae Zepeda‡	2019	2026	49	1,358	101	38.80	6	1	900	33	4/14	21.06	14	0	
12	Sylvia Kailath	2019	2021	13	31	15	3.44	0	0	132	6	2/28	30.83	0	0	
13	Albulena Avdylaj	2019	2019	2	1	1*	–	0	0	–	–	–	–	0	0	
14	Jo-Antoinette Stiglitz‡	2020	2025	48	617	49*	19.28	0	0	492	16	2/1	36.18	5	0	
15	Bangalore Chamundaiah	2020	2023	23	20	9*	10.00	0	0	412	9	2/15	49.00	3	0	
16	Gandhali Bapat‡†	2021	2022	16	218	41*	21.80	0	0	–	–	–	–	7	4	
17	Mahadewa Pathirannehelage	2021	2026	49	458	49	14.31	0	0	1059	53	5/16	15.01	13	0	
18	Ashmaan Saifee	2021	2026	23	3	1	0.75	0	0	190	10	3/21	24.60	1	0	
19	Komati Reddy	2021	2026	35	210	47*	17.50	0	0	651	27	4/2	21.00	7	0	
20	Priyadharshini Ponraj	2021	2022	4	0	0	0.00	0	0	42	1	1/34	63.00	0	0	
21	Raphaela Trobinger	2021	2021	1	–	–	–	–	–	6	0	–	–	0	0	
22	Saafiya Mohideen	2022	2022	2	–	–	–	–	–	18	1	1/21	41.00	0	0	
23	Hannah Simpson-Parker	2022	2025	23	131	28	7.27	0	0	49	0	–	–	1	0	
24	Hadia Siddiqui	2023	2026	21	25	9	2.77	0	0	240	6	2/15	35.66	4	0	
25	Sushma Kittimani	2023	2023	5	37	17	7.40	0	0	71	3	2/25	24.33	0	0	
26	Sheetal Bhardwaj	2023	2026	31	131	22	5.45	0	0	310	18	2/4	16.05	2	0	
27	Emma Kirkman†	2023	2025	13	59	24*	8.42	0	0	–	–	–	–	6	3	
28	Pravitha Ganeshan	2023	2025	18	11	4	2.75	0	0	12	0	–	–	0	0	
29	Prabhavathi Talloji	2024	2025	7	3	2	1.50	0	0	–	–	–	–	0	0	
30	Damini Kaul	2024	2024	1	–	–	–	–	–	–	–	–	–	0	0	
31	Vera Poglitsch	2024	2026	11	3	3	1.00	0	0	7	0	–	–	2	0	
32	Prithaa Ganeshan	2025	2026	9	1	1*	1.00	0	0	–	–	–	–	0	0	
33	Smriti Kohli	2025	2025	1	–	–	–	–	–	–	–	–	–	0	0	
34	Ashi Chopla	2025	2025	7	3	2*	1.50	0	0	107	2	1/17	60.50	0	0	
35	Shalika Ariyasinghage	2025	2025	4	1	1	0.33	0	0	6	0	–	–	0	0	
36	Anjuman Hira	2026	2026	1	0	0	0.00	0	0	–	–	–	–	0	0	
37	Florence Hira	2026	2026	2	–	–	–	–	–	–	–	–	–	0	0	
38	Jennifer Hira	2026	2026	2	–	–	–	–	–	–	–	–	–	0	0	
