= Port Mourant =

- Town
- Location in Guyana
- Coordinates: 6°15′N 57°20′W
- Country: Guyana
- Region: East Berbice/Corentyne

Population (2012)
  - Total: 1,136
- Time zone: UTC-4
- Climate: Af

Port Mourant is a town on the Atlantic coast in East Berbice-Corentyne, Guyana. It is the birthplace of the late president Cheddi Jagan as well as many of Guyana's most famous cricketers. Port Mourant was originally a sugar estate. Many residents are self-employed, but the sugar industry continues to be a source of employment.

Port Mourant is made up of 15 areas including Free Yard, Bound Yard, Portuguese Quarter, Bangladesh, Ankerville, Clifton, Tain, Miss Phoebe and John's. Bound Yard was named for the indentured labourers who lived there, and when their contracts were finished, they moved to Free Yard. Neighboring areas include Rose Hall town and Bloomfield village. Port Mourant is named after Stephen Mourant, who founded the cotton plantation that later became the Port Mourant Sugar Estate.

== History ==
The Port Mourant sugar estate was situated in what was historically called the Corantyne district. Through the progressive reforms of J.C. Gibson, by the mid 20th century, this district was considered the more prosperous of the sugar-growing regions, the largest producer of rice, and the five estates also supported a wider array of services independent from the sugar industry which were all centered at Port Mourant. Residents were mostly Indo-Guyanese, with a small number of Afro-Guyanese people. The town had its own factory for processing sugar cane until it closed in 1955.

== Education ==
The village has nursery schools at Tain, Ankerville and Port Mourant. Primary schools are in Tain and Port Mourant (formerly Anglican Elementary).

Secondary schools include Joseph Chamberlain Chandisingh Secondary (formerly Corentyne High School, Est.1938), Port Mourant Secondary (formerly Roman Catholic Elementary), and Corentyne Comprehensive High School (formerly 'Compre'/Rudra Nath High).

Tertiary education includes an extension of the University of Guyana at Tain since November 2000, and the GuySuCo Apprentice Training Centre.

RN Persaud High School (Sideline Dam), now defunct, was the first secondary school in Berbice.

== Health care ==
- Port Mourant Hospital - A 53-bed facility located in Ankerville, for primary health care, pediatrics, and minor surgical services. The emergency center was upgraded in 2012 and a triage building was built in 2019 with international donations.
- National Ophthalmology Centre - opened July 25, 2009 provides services for Guyana and neighboring country Suriname.
- Guysuco Dispensary at Side Line Dam
- Johns's Settlement Senior Citizens Home

== Commerce ==
Port Mourant has two majors markets; the Port Mourant Market, which is one of the largest markets in Guyana, and the Tain Market. Both are mainly farmers' markets, and the market at Port Mourant also offers a wide variety of other goods for sale, including overseas imports. The village also has "fast-food outlets, a supermarket, small restaurants, rum shops, a gas station, travel service, a barber’s shop, lumber yard, Skye Communication, E-Networks and various other businesses."

Guyana Bank for Trade and Industry has a Port Mourant branch.

=== Entertainment ===
The Port Mourant Community Center Ground is a major cricket venue, and the Port Mourant Cricket Club is a major regional team. Founded through the support of J.C. Gibson in 1916, the Port Mourant Cricket Club served as the foundation from which the Community Center Ground later emerged. Port Mourant also has a volleyball team.

Port Mourant Racetrack features horse racing.

The former Roopmahal Cinema in Miss Phoebe was one of the oldest cinemas in the Berbice area until it was replaced with a shopping mall in 2013.

== Places of interest ==
The Babu John Cemetery is the location of the cremation of the late Dr. Cheddi Jagan and his wife Janet Jagan. The site was established by J.C. Gibson after World War I in response to the influenza outbreak affecting Port Mourant. Babu John, a sugar planter from De Keneren, was the cemetery's caretaker and it was named for him when he died.

== Religious institutions ==
Hindu temples include the Miss Phoebe North Kali Temple, Free Yard Hindu Mandir, Shri Krishna Mandir (Miss Phoebe north), Vishnu Saanaatan Mandir, Maha Kali Mandir (Portuguese quarter north), Miss Phoebe Hindu Mandir, Sideline Shiva Mandir, and the Tain Hindu Mandir.

Other denominational services are at God of the Change International Church Haswell, Tain Bible Church, Tain Living Water Assembly, Tain Seven Day Adventist, St. Joseph Anglican Church and St Francis Xavier Roman Catholic Church.

Islamic organizations include the Jama masjid in Ankerville, Miss Phoebe masjid and an Islamic school at Train line.

Charitable organizations include the Guyana Hindu Dharmic Sabha (Bal Nivas) and the New Jersey Arya Samaj Mission Center.

== Notable residents ==
- Cheddi Jagan - late president of Guyana, Recipient of the Order of the Liberator
- J.C. Gibson - Scottish landowner, progressive manager of Port Mourant, and director of Booker Group
- Lionel Luckhoo - politician and lawyer
- Peter Kempadoo - writer and radio broadcaster
- Deborah Persaud - virologist
- Cricketers: Clive Lloyd, Rohan Kanhai, Basil Butcher, Joe Solomon, Alvin Kallicharran, Randolph Ramnarace, Ivan Madray and John Trim.
