= Austria women's cricket team in Italy in 2021 =

	Italy women	Austria women
- Dates: 9 – 12 August 2021
Captains	Kumudu Peddrick	Gandhali Bapat

Twenty20 International series
- Results: Austria women won the 5-match series 3–2
Most runs	Kumudu Peddrick (125)	Andrea-Mae Zepeda (111)
Most wickets	Sharon Withanage (7)	Valentina Avdylaj (8)

The Austria women's cricket team toured Italy in August 2021 to play a five-match bilateral Women's Twenty20 International (WT20I) series. The matches were played at the Roma Cricket Ground in the Spinaceto area of Rome, and were the first official WT20I matches played by Italy. A tri-nation series including Jersey had been scheduled, but they were unable to take part due to COVID-19 travel restrictions.

In July 2021, the Italian Cricket Federation organised training camps in the north and south of the country and selected a squad to represent these two areas in warm-up matches, after which a 20-player squad (including reserves) was selected. The Italians won the series opener, which was their first official WT20I match. After levelling the series on day two, Austria gained an unassailable lead by winning a double-header on the fourth day. Italy gained a consolation victory by a single run in the final match, while Austria won the series 3–2.

== Squads ==
Italy	Austria
Kumudu Peddrick (c); Teshani Araliya; Rashini Aththidi (wk); Gayathri Batagoda; Niroshni Diminguwarige; Sewmini Kanankege; Sadalee Malwatta; Dilaisha Nanayakkara; Nipuni Ponnanperumage; Sarah Sabelli; Dayana Samarasunghe; Dishani Samarawickrama; Francesca Vaccarella; Sharon Withanage (wk)	Gandhali Bapat (c, wk); Valentina Avdylaj; Harjivan Bhullar; Bangalore Chamundaiah; Harjot Dhaliwal; Sylvia Kailath; Anisha Nookala; Mahadewa Pathirannehelage; Priyadharshini Ponraj; Komati Reddy; Priya Sabu; Ashmaan Saifee; Jo-Antoinette Stiglitz; Busra Uca; Andrea-Mae Zepeda

== WT20I series ==
=== 1st WT20I ===
9 August 2021
09:00
Scorecard

Austria; 107/3 (20 overs)	v	Italy; 108/2 (16.1 overs)
Andrea-Mae Zepeda 33 (60); Dishani Samarawickrama 1/14 (4 overs)		Kumudu Peddrick 47* (47); Valentina Avdylaj 2/9 (3.1 overs)

Italy won by 8 wickets
Roma Cricket Ground, Rome
Umpires: Claudio Fabbri (Ita) and Shanaka Fernando (Ita)

- Austria won the toss and elected to bat.
- Teshani Araliya, Rashini Aththidi, Gayathri Batagoda, Niroshni Diminguwarige, Sewmini Kanankege, Sadalee Malwatta, Dilaisha Nanayakkara, Kumudu Peddrick, Dayana Samarasunghe, Dishani Samarawickrama, Sharon Withanage (Ita), Gandhali Bapat, Mahadewa Pathirannehelage and Ashmaan Saifee (Aut) all made their WT20I debuts.

=== 2nd WT20I ===
10 August 2021
09:00
Scorecard

Italy; 98/6 (20 overs)	v	Austria; 99/3 (19.1 overs)
Dishani Samarawickrama 33 (38); Sylvia Kailath 1/11 (2 overs)		Gandhali Bapat 19 (35); Dishani Samarawickrama 1/12 (4 overs)

Austria won by 7 wickets
Roma Cricket Ground, Rome
Umpires: Claudio Fabbri (Ita) and Muhammad Shahid (Ita)

- Italy won the toss and elected to bat.
- Komati Reddy (Aut) made her WT20I debut.

=== 3rd WT20I ===
11 August 2021
09:00
Scorecard

Austria; 120/5 (20 overs)	v	Italy; 113/3 (20 overs)
Andrea-Mae Zepeda 43 (44); Sharon Withanage 3/32 (4 overs)		Kumudu Peddrick 50* (66); Sylvia Kailath 1/18 (2 overs)

Austria won by 7 runs
Roma Cricket Ground, Rome
Umpires: Shanaka Fernando (Ita) and Muhammad Shahid (Ita)

- Italy won the toss and elected to field.
- Sarah Sabelli (Ita) made her WT20I debut.

=== 4th WT20I ===
11 August 2021
16:00
Scorecard

Italy; 73 (17.1 overs)	v	Austria; 74/4 (12.1 overs)
Rashini Aththidi 8* (18); Valentina Avdylaj 4/12 (4 overs)		Jo-Antoinette Stiglitz 14 (14); Sharon Withanage 2/22 (4 overs)

Austria won by 6 wickets
Roma Cricket Ground, Rome
Umpires: Ali Hassan (Ita) and Muhammad Shahid (Ita)

- Italy won the toss and elected to bat.
- Francesca Vaccarella (Ita) made her WT20I debut.

=== 5th WT20I ===
12 August 2021
16:00
Scorecard

Italy; 99/5 (20 overs)	v	Austria; 98/8 (20 overs)
Kumudu Peddrick 28 (37); Sylvia Kailath 1/4 (1 over)		Gandhali Bapat 37 (36); Dishani Samarawickrama 2/9 (4 overs)

Italy won by 1 run
Roma Cricket Ground, Rome
Umpires: Shanaka Fernando (Ita) and Ali Hassan (Ita)

- Italy won the toss and elected to bat.
- Nipuni Ponnanperumage (Ita) made her WT20I debut.
