= Roshini Kempadoo =

Photographer, media artist and academic (born 1959)

- Born: 1959 (age 66–67); Crawley, Sussex, England
- Education: University of Derby
- Occupations: Photographer, media artist and academic
- Parent(s): Rosemary Kempadoo (mother); Peter Kempadoo (father)
- Relatives: Oonya Kempadoo and Kamala Kempadoo (sisters)
- Website: https://roshinikempadoo.com/

Roshini Kempadoo (born Crawley, Sussex, England, 1959) is a British photographer, media artist, and academic. For more than 20 years she has been a lecturer and researcher in photography, digital media production, and cultural studies in a variety of educational institutions, and is currently a professor in Photography and Visual Culture at the University of Westminster.

Her photography has been concerned with women's issues and issues of representation, particularly of black people. In her research, multimedia, and photographic projects, which explore the visual representation of the Caribbean, she combines "factual and fictional re-imaginings of contemporary experiences with history and memory ...[and] her recent work as a digital image artist includes photographs and screen-based interactive art installations that fictionalize Caribbean archive material, objects, and spaces."

== Early life and education ==
Roshini Kempadoo was born in Crawley, Sussex, England, having spent a decade of her childhood in the Caribbean, from where her family originates. As she describes her background,

"You could say my parents were part of the 'Windrush Generation'. My father (Peter Kempadoo) arrived in London in the 1950s, but my family moved back and forth between the UK and the Caribbean. I was born in England and returned to the Caribbean as a child. I spent my formative years, between the ages of 11-18, in Jamaica and Guyana. I had the good fortune of knowing the Caribbean very well through my experiences growing up in Barbados, Trinidad, Jamaica and Guyana."

She attended St. Rose's High School in Georgetown, Guyana, and returned to the UK for her university education in 1977 (her family relocated to Saint Lucia shortly afterwards). She studied Visual Communications at undergraduate level, specializing in Photography in her final year, and subsequently earning a master's degree in Photographic Studies at the University of Derby.

== Career ==
Kempadoo joined Format, the women's photographic agency conceived by Maggie Murray and Val Wilmer, and was also involved in establishing the first Black British photographic association, Autograph ABP, together with Monika Baker, Sunil Gupta, Rotimi Fani-Kayode and Armet Francis. She pursued a photographic career from the 1980s and '90s onwards:

it was a period of time in which we were re-defining representations of the black subject. It was an exciting period of time where photography and film moved away from traditional visual arts studies and became more radically linked to cultural studies and criticism. Photography of this kind became situated outside fine art studies, and this broader interdisciplinary field allowed me to consider photography in relation to notions of psychoanalysis, post-colonialism and feminist studies, drawing on the seminal texts of Stuart Hall, Susan Sontag, Laura Mulvey and John Berger to think about photography.

She also counts among her influences colleagues such as John Akomfrah, Sunil Gupta, Ingrid Pollard and Keith Piper, in addition to those involved with publishing the international independent photographic magazine Ten.8, among them Derek Bishton, Rhonda Wilson (with whom she co-edited the Spectrum Women's Photography Festival exhibition catalogue, published as a special supplement to issue 30 of the magazine) and John Taylor.

She has exhibited regularly internationally, including in Trinidad, Toronto (curated by Sheila Petty, University of Regina), New York and the Netherlands. A major retrospective of her photographic and digital art, Roshini Kempadoo: Works 1990 – 2004, opened at the PM Gallery and House in 2004 and subsequently toured.

Her work has been acquired by the National Portrait Gallery, London, and Autograph ABP, London, and is in the collections of other institutions and individuals, including Yale Center for British Art, Connecticut, US, and the Birmingham Museum and Libraries Collection UK.

She is the author of the book Creole in the Archive: Imagery, Presence and the Location of the Caribbean Figure (2016).

== Personal life ==
She is the daughter of artist Rosemary Kempadoo. who had been taught by Guyanese painter Stanley Greaves and was part of a network of artists in Georgetown in the 1970s that included Aubrey Williams. Her father is the writer Peter Kempadoo. She is from a family of nine children. One of her sisters is the sexology professor Kamala Kempadoo, and her youngest sister is the novelist Oonya Kempadoo. She lives with her husband and long term companion Paul Wilcox in London.

== Selected exhibitions ==
=== Solo ===
- 2001: Virtual Exiles. Lighthouse Media Arts Centre, Wolverhampton, UK (January) and Galeria Moderna, Ljubljana, Slovenia, for Mesto Zensk, City of Women festival (October).
- 2004: Roshini Kempadoo: Works 1990 – 2004. Tour included a new commission "endless prospects" at Pitzhanger Manor and Gallery, London, UK (July–September)
- 2005: Roshini Kempadoo: Works 1990 – 2004. Russell-Cotes Art Gallery and Museum, Bournemouth (October–November)

=== Group ===
- 1990 Autoportraits, curated by Autograph, Camerawork, London, with Monika Baker, Allan deSouza, Rotimi Fani-Kayode, Joy Gregory, Sunil Gupta, Mumtaz Karimjee, and Roshini Kempadoo.
- 2000–01: Reflections in Black, curated by Deborah Willis, at the Anacostia at the Smithsonian Museum, Washington DC (March)
- 2002: Artwork commission Back Routes CD-Rom for the exhibition Travelogue: Views of Britain by seven contemporary artists, curated by Mary Griffiths for Whitworth Art Gallery, Manchester, UK (June–September).
- 2003: Global Detail, curated by Wim Melis for the Nooderlicht PhotoFestival, 2003, Groningen, Netherlands.
- 2004: A Place Called Home, curated by Zayd Minty for NSA Gallery, Durban, South Africa (June–July). South African National Gallery (SANG), Cape Town (September–November)
- 2005: Racing the Cultural Interface: African Diasporic Identities in the Digital Age. MSVU Art Gallery, Mount Saint Vincent University, Halifax, Canada (January–March)
- 2006–07: Latitudes 2006 - Terres de Amazonie, Hotel de Ville, Paris (included a selection from the series Virtual Exiles). Curated by Regine Cuzin (December–January 2007)
- 2007: Art & Emancipation In Jamaica: Isaac Mendes Belisario and His Worlds, Yale Center for British Art, New Haven‚ Connecticut (September–December)*2009: 7th Encuentro: Staging Citizenship: Cultural Rights in the Americas, Hemispheric Institute of Performance and Politics, Museo de Artes, National University of Colombia, Bogotá (August)
  - Liminal: A Question of Position, inIVA, Rivington Place, London (March–April)
- 2010: Format Photography Agency 1983–2003, National Portrait Gallery, London, Room 38a (January–July).
- 2011: About Change (Part 1), a joint project of the World Bank, the Art Museum of the Americas, the Organization of American States, and the Cultural Center of the Inter-American Development Bank. World Bank Art Program, Washington DC, USA (May–July).
  - Wrestling with the Image: Caribbean Interventions, Art Museum of the Americas, Washington DC. USA (January–May)
  - Rester et Partir / Staying and Leaving / Toso any ka take (2011), Point Sud, Bamako, Mali (February)
- 2015: Ghosts: Keith Piper/Roshini Kempadoo, curated by Paul Goodwin, Central Saint Martins Lethaby Gallery (27 November–11 December).
- 2016: What We Have Overlooked, curated by Mirjam Westen, Museum Arnhem (30 June–21 August).

== Bibliography ==
- Creole in the Archive: Imagery, Presence and the Location of the Caribbean Figure, Rowman & Littlefield International, 2016. ISBN 978-1783482207.

=== Contributions to publications ===
- 2007: "Back Routes: Historical articulation in Multimedia Production", in Grossman, A., and A. O'Brien (eds), Projecting Migration: Transcultural Documentary Practice. London: Wallflower Press, pp. 199–215. ISBN 190567404X.
- 2007: "Digital media practice as critique: Roshini Kempadoo's installations Ghosting and endless prospects (2004)", in Arana, V. (ed.), "Black" British Aesthetics Today. Newcastle upon Tyne, UK: Cambridge Scholars Publishing, pp. 283–296. ISBN 1-84718-116-3.
- 2008: "Photographing Here/There", in Into the Open: Ania Dabrowska & John Nassari. London, Four Corners Gallery. pp. 38–39.
- 2010: "Interpolating screen bytes: Critical commentary in multimedia artworks", Journal of Media Practice, 11(1), 59–80.
