= Belgium women's cricket team in Austria in 2021 =

International cricket tour

Belgium women's cricket team in Austria in 2021–22
	Austria women	Belgium women
- Dates: 25 – 26 September 2021
Captains	Gandhali Bapat	Nicola Thrupp

Twenty20 International series
- Results: Austria women won the 3-match series 3–0
Most runs	Andrea-Mae Zepeda (250)	Nicola Thrupp (90)
Most wickets	Ashmaan Saifee (2); Bangalore Chamundaiah (2)	Shweta Sinha (4)

The Belgium women's cricket team toured Austria in September 2021 to play a three-match bilateral Women's Twenty20 International (WT20I) series. The matches were played at the Seebarn Cricket Ground in Lower Austria, and were the first official WT20I matches played by Belgium. Austria won the series 3–0.

== Squads ==
Austria	Belgium
Gandhali Bapat (c, wk); Valentina Avdylaj; Harjivan Bhullar; Bangalore Chamundaiah; Harjot Dhaliwal; Tugce Kazanci; Anisha Nookala; Mahadewa Pathirannehelage; Priyadharshini Ponraj; Komati Reddy; Priya Sabu; Ashmaan Saifee; Jo-Antoinette Stiglitz; Raphaela Trobinger; Busra Uca; Andrea-Mae Zepeda	Nicola Thrupp (c); Zara Amanda; Anya Beairsto; Shraddha Bhandari; Shirin Dias; Rosemary Lister; Jani Mclean; Susan Parker; Anindita Pramanik (wk); Ananya Singh; Shweta Sinha; Hinduja Venigalla; Nikita Verma

== WT20I series ==
=== 1st WT20I ===
25 September 2021
10:00
Scorecard

Austria; 197/2 (20 overs)	v	Belgium; 79/3 (20 overs)
Andrea-Mae Zepeda 101 (63); Anya Beairsto 1/22 (4 overs); Nicola Thrupp 1/22 (4 overs)		Zara Amanda 14 (52); Bangalore Chamundaiah 2/23 (4 overs)

Austria won by 118 runs
Seebarn Cricket Ground, Lower Austria
Umpires: Dharminder Pal Rauhia (Aut) and Allala Santosh (Aut)
Player of the match: Andrea-Mae Zepeda (Aut)

- Belgium won the toss and elected to field.
- Zara Amanda, Anya Beairsto, Rosemary Lister, Jani Mclean, Susan Parker, Anindita Pramanik, Ananya Singh, Shweta Sinha, Nicola Thrupp, Hinduja Venigalla and Nikita Verma (Bel) all made their WT20I debuts.
- Andrea-Mae Zepeda became the first player for Austria to score a century in WT20Is.
- 10 penalty runs were added to Austria's total due to a slow over rate.

=== 2nd WT20I ===
25 September 2021
14:30
Scorecard

Austria; 212/4 (20 overs)	v	Belgium; 100/3 (20 overs)
Andrea-Mae Zepeda 65 (46); Shweta Sinha 2/32 (4 overs)		Nicola Thrupp 50* (59)

Austria won by 112 runs
Seebarn Cricket Ground, Lower Austria
Umpires: Dharminder Pal Rauhia (Aut) and Allala Santosh (Aut)
Player of the match: Andrea-Mae Zepeda (Aut)

- Austria won the toss and elected to bat.
- Shraddha Bhandari and Shirin Dias (Bel) both made their WT20I debuts.
- 15 penalty runs were added to Austria's total due to a slow over rate.

=== 3rd WT20I ===
26 September 2021
10:00
Scorecard

Austria; 188/2 (20 overs)	v	Belgium; 114/5 (20 overs)
Andrea-Mae Zepeda 84* (59); Shweta Sinha 2/26 (4 overs)		Nicola Thrupp 35* (29); Ashmaan Saifee 2/17 (2 overs)

Austria won by 74 runs
Seebarn Cricket Ground, Lower Austria
Umpires: Dharminder Pal Rauhia (Aut) and Allala Santosh (Aut)
Player of the match: Andrea-Mae Zepeda (Aut)

- Austria won the toss and elected to bat.
- Priyadharshini Ponraj and Raphaela Trobinger (Aut) both made their WT20I debuts.
