= Kamala Kempadoo =

Guyanese author and sexology professor

- Born: England
- Education: Ohio State University (Master's); University of Amsterdam (BA and Doctorandus); University of Colorado-Boulder (PhD)
- Employer: York University
- Known for: Writing and teaching about sexual labour and anti-trafficking.
- Father: Peter Kempadoo
- Relatives: Oonya Kempadoo and Roshini Kempadoo (sisters)

Kamala Kempadoo is a British-Guyanese author and sociology professor who lives in Barbados and Canada. She has written multiple books about sex work and human trafficking and won awards from the Caribbean Studies Association and the Society for the Scientific Study of Sexuality for her distinguished and lifetime achievements.

== Early life and education ==
Kempadoo was born in England to Guyanese parents Rosemary Read Kempadoo (teacher and part-time writer) and Peter Kempadoo (development worker and writer). She is the second oldest of nine siblings. Her seven sisters include Oonya Kempadoo and Roshini Kempadoo; she has one younger brother.

Kempadoo has a BA and a doctorandus degree in social sciences from the University of Amsterdam, a master’s degree in Black Studies from Ohio State University, and a Ph.D in sociology from the University of Colorado-Boulder.

== Career ==
Kempadoo has worked in research since the early 1990s with an initial focus on sexual labour in the Caribbean, before shifting to focus on sex work in general and anti-trafficking in low income countries.

She joined York University in 2002, where she worked as professor to advance the understanding and promote the study of sex work, Caribbean studies and Black radical thought. At York University, she has held academic appointments in social science, political science; gender, feminist and women’s studies; social and political thought; and development studies.

Kempadoo has had academic affiliations with the Sir Arthur Lewis Institute of Social and Economic Studies at the University of the West Indies at Cave Hill in Barbados and the Institute for Gender and Development Studies.

In 2018, she was awarded the Society for the Scientific Study of Sexuality's Distinguished Scientific Achievement Award for her contributions to the field of sexuality studies. She was also awarded the Lifetime Achievement Award from the Caribbean Studies Association (CSA) in the same year. The CSA said that Kempadoo is "one of the most important scholars and influential thinkers on the global sex trade, sex work, human trafficking, and sexual-economic relations."

== Views ==
Kempadoo is proponent for the decriminalisation of sex work and has spoken about how shadism affects the earning potential of sex workers in Curacao.

== Personal life ==
Kempadoo has previously lived in the UK, Netherlands, United States, and throughout the Caribbean. Since 2002, she has been based in Canada and since 2005 lives part of the year in Barbados.

== Selected publications ==
- The white man’s burden revisited, OpenDemocracy, 2015

=== Books ===
- Trafficking and Prostitution Reconsidered, Paradigm, 2005/2012
- Sexing the Caribbean: Gender, Race and Sexual Labour, New York, Routledge, 2004
- Sun, Sex and Gold: Tourism and Sex Work in the Caribbean, Boulder, Colorado, Rowman and Littlefield, 1999
- Kamala Kempadoo and Jo Doezema Global Sex Workers: Rights, Resistance and Redefinition, New York, Routledge, 1998
- Kamala Kempadoo, Jyoti Sanghera, and Bandana Pattanaik Trafficking and Prostitution Reconsidered: New Perspectives on Migration, Sex Work, and Human Rights. Boulder, Colorado, Paradigm Publishers, 2005 & 2012

=== Papers ===
- Kamala Kempadoo, Halimah DeShong, and Charmaine Crawford, Caribbean Feminist Research Methods for Gender and Sexuality Studies, Special issue of the Caribbean Review of Gender Studies 7 (Dec 2013) http://sta.uwi.edu/crgs/
- Kamala Kempadoo and Darya Davydova, From Bleeding Hearts to Critical Thinking: Exploring the Issue of Human Trafficking. Toronto Centre for Feminist Research, York University, 2012. http://cfr.info.yorku.ca/fbh/
