= Andrea-Mae Zepeda =

Austrian cricketer (born 1995)

Personal information
- Full name: Andrea-Mae Zepeda
- Born: 24 October 1995 (age 31)
- Batting: Right-handed
- Bowling: Right-arm medium
- Role: All-rounder

International information
- National side: Austria (2019–present)
- T20I debut (cap 11): 31 July 2019 v Norway
- Last T20I: 12 October 2025 v Norway

Domestic team information
- Years: Team
- Austria Cricket Club, Vienna

Career statistics
Competition	WT20I
Matches	47
Runs scored	1,312
Batting average	37.48
100s/50s	1/6
Top score	101
Balls bowled	852
Wickets	27
Bowling average	24.85
5 wickets in innings	0
10 wickets in match	0
Best bowling	4/16
Catches/stumpings	14/–
- Source: Cricinfo, 12 October 2025

Andrea-Mae Zepeda (born 24 October 1995) is an Austrian cricketer and medical doctor. She plays for her national cricket team as an all-rounder. In 2019, she captained the team in its first ever Women's Twenty20 International (WT20I). In 2021, she became the first player to score a century for Austria in a WT20I. In January 2022, Zepeda was named as the ICC Women's Associate Cricketer of the Year by the International Cricket Council (ICC).

== Early life and career ==
Zepeda recalls that when she was 7 years old, she had a cricket lesson at school. However, she did not become involved in cricket until two years later, when her younger brother started playing the game. The two of them would play together. In her home city, there was only one cricket pitch, and during her youth, very few girls played cricket. Zepeda therefore usually trained and played cricket with boys.

After having played cricket for a while, Zepeda realised that she wanted to play in a women's team. In 2015, she took the field for a Continental Women's XI in two matches against a Netherlands Invitation XI played in Utrecht. The Continental XI was made up of players from Austria, Belgium, Denmark, France, Gibraltar and Hungary. The following year, 2016, Zepeda was involved in the setting up of women's cricket in Austria.

== Domestic career ==
At the domestic level, Zepeda plays for Austria Cricket Club of Vienna.

== International career ==
On 31 July 2019, Zepeda made her WT20I debut for, and also captained, Austria in the team's first ever WT20I, a match against Norway at the Parc du Grand Blottereau, Nantes, France. Norway won that match, which was part of a T20I quadrangular series also involving France and Jersey. However, Austria then defeated Jersey by 3 runs, with Zepeda taking 3/18 in 4 overs, and also later won a second match against Norway, with Zepeda recording the top score, of 43* in 43 balls. Overall, Austria finished third in the series, and Zepeda scored the most runs, with 125.

In August 2020, Zepeda captained Austria in a five match bilateral series between Austria and Germany, at the Seebarn Cricket Ground near Vienna. Although she top scored for Austria in the first and fourth matches of the series, with 35* and 25, respectively, Germany comfortably won the series 5–0.

Twelve months later, in August 2021, Austria played another five match bilateral series, against Italy at the Roma Cricket Club, Spinaceto. This time, Austria was captained by Gandhali Bapat, who had not previously played for the team. In the first match of that series, Zepeda top scored for Austria with 33 runs in 60 balls, but Italy, playing in its first ever WT20I, won the match by 8 wickets. Austria then took the series by winning the next three matches in a row, with Zepeda achieving a top score of 43 in 44 balls in the third match. Austria also emerged as 3–2 series victors when Italy won the fifth match.

The following month, Austria, again captained by Bapat, hosted Belgium for a shorter bilateral series, of three matches, at Seebarn Cricket Ground. In the first match of the series, which was also Belgium's first ever WT20I, Zepeda scored 101 in 63 balls to become the first player to score a century for Austria in a WT20I. She was also named player of the match, which Austria won by 118 runs. In the second and third matches, Austria won by 112 and 74 runs, respectively, and Zepeda again top scored, with 65 and 84*, respectively. She was also named as player of the match in both matches, and thus achieved a clean sweep of the player of the match awards for the series.

In May 2022, Zepeda played in the privately run 2022 FairBreak Invitational T20 in Dubai, United Arab Emirates. She was allocated to the Tornadoes team.

== Off the field ==
When not playing cricket, Zepeda works full time as a medical doctor.

== See also ==
- List of centuries in women's Twenty20 International cricket
- List of Austria women Twenty20 International cricketers
