= Peter Kempadoo =

Guyanese novelist and broadcaster (1926–2019)

- Born: 1926; Guyana
- Died: 24 August 2019 (aged 92); London, England
- Occupations: Writer and broadcaster
- Notable work: Guiana Boy (1960); Old Thom's Harvest (1965)
- Children: Manganita, Kamala, Shamanee, Roshini, Malasula, Oonya, Sanjhevi, Valmiki, Anoushka

Peter "Lauchmonen" Kempadoo (1926 – 24 August 2019) was a writer and broadcaster from Guyana. He also worked as a development worker in the Caribbean, Africa and Asia. He moved in 1953 to the UK, where he built a career in print journalism as well as radio and television broadcasting, and published two novels, Guiana Boy in 1960 — the first novel by a Guyanese of Indian descent — and Old Thom's Harvest in 1965, before returning to Guyana in 1970. He died in London, England, aged 92.

== Biography ==
He was born on the Port Mourant sugar estate to James Kempadoo, aka Lauchmonen, and Priscilla Alemeloo Tambran, both Tamils. Peter Kempadoo was educated first at St. Joseph Anglican School, then went on, at the age of 10, to attend Port Mourant Roman Catholic School. There, he passed the Junior and Senior Cambridge examinations, before becoming a pupil-teacher at Port Mourant and, at 17, a certified teacher. Moving in 1947 to Georgetown, he trained as a nurse at Georgetown Public Hospital, and reported on hospital matters for the Daily Argosy until he was invited to join the staff.

Having married in 1952, Kempadoo migrated the following year with his family to England, where he worked for the BBC, and the Central Office of Information.

During this time he wrote his first novel, Guiana Boy. Published in 1960 (re-issued as Guyana Boy in 2002 by Peepal Tree Press), this was the first novel by a Guyanese of Indian descent. The Caribbean Review of Books described the novel as "an intimate, clear-eyed portrait of Indo-Guyanese rural life", in which the author "channels the spirits of dignified misfits to dismantle the rigid hierarchies governing former plantation societies, all while honouring the polyglot traditions their descendants have elected to preserve."

In addition to Guyana Boy, he was the author of another novel, Old Thom's Harvest (1965), which focuses on religious and ethnic practices in the life of a rural family. Kempadoo's work has been anthologised in The Sun's Eye (ed. Anne Walmsley) and My Lovely Native Land (ed. A. J. Seymour). He has also co-authored with his wife a booklet entitled A–Z of Guyanese Words.

In 1970, Kempadoo returned with his family to Guyana, where he produced local radio programmes such as Rural Life Guyana, We the People, Our Kind of Folk and Jarai (with Marc Matthews).

Kempadoo also lived for some years in Barbados, but was mainly based in the UK.

In 2016, as part of activities held to celebrate the 50th anniversary of Guyana's independence, Kempadoo was honoured at the Jubilee Literary Festival at the University of Guyana. In 2018, he was honoured with a Windrush Lifetime Service Award.

He died in London on 24 August 2019.

== Family life ==
Kempadoo's father was James Kempadoo, the chauffeur of J. C. Gibson and captain of the Port Mourant Cricket Club. Kempadoo married Rosemary Read in 1952 and Mayrose Abbensetts in 1992. He was the father of Manghanita, sexology professor Kamala, Shamanee, photographer Roshini , Malasula, Valmiki, novelist Oonya, Sanjhevi, and Anoushka. Kempadoo lived in London, England.

In about 1969, at 11 years of age, Kempadoo’s daughter Manghanita Kempadoo wrote the short epistolary story Letters of Thanks: A Christmas Tale, a comic riff on the Christmas carol "The Twelve Days of Christmas", which was published with illustrations by Helen Oxenbury (Great Britain: Collins Publishers, 1969; New York: Simon & Schuster, 1986, ISBN 0-671-62794-5).

== Bibliography ==
- Guiana Boy (Crawley, Sussex: New Literature). Reissued as Guyana Boy, Peepal Tree Press, 2002. ISBN 9781900715560
- Old Thom's Harvest (London: Eyre and Spottiswoode, 1965).
