= Bourda =

Cricket ground in Georgetown, Guyana

Coordinates: 6°48′29.40″N 58°8′59.54″W

- Georgetown Cricket Club
- Interactive map of Bourda

Ground information
- Location: Georgetown, Guyana
- Country: West Indies
- Establishment: 1884
- Capacity: 10,000
- Owner: Government of Guyana
- Operator: Guyana Cricket Board
- Tenants: Guyana cricket team
- End names
- Regent Street End; North Road End

International information
- First men's Test: 21–26 March 1930: West Indies v England
- Last men's Test: 31 March – 4 April 2005: West Indies v South Africa
- First men's ODI: 30 March 1988: West Indies v Pakistan
- Last men's ODI: 7 May 2006: West Indies v Zimbabwe

Team information
Georgetown Cricket Club	(1884–present)
Guyana cricket team	(1884–present)
- As of 16 October 2015; Source: Cricinfo

Bourda, or officially Georgetown Cricket Club Ground, is a cricket ground in Georgetown, Guyana, used by the Guyanese cricket team for matches with other nations in the Caribbean as well as some Test matches involving the West Indies. The ground is one of the two cricket stadiums in the South American mainland and is uniquely surrounded by a moat for flood-prevention and drainage purposes.

== History ==
The stadium is located in Bourda in Georgetown, Guyana between Regent Street and North Road, and is home to the Georgetown Cricket Club (GCC). The ground is reminiscent of old baseball stadiums, due to its cantilever stands. The ground was dubbed "The Cornerstone" in 1930 after a game against visiting England.

The longtime community leader of Port Mourant, J.C. Gibson, was instrumental in developing youth athletics in Guyana. Notably, he established the Port Mourant Cricket Club (PMCC) and the Gibson Shield, a cricket tournament held annually at the grounds. In 1940, the Eversham Church of Scotland School won the tournament.

There would be a similar incident in 1999, when the West Indies hosted Australia at the ground, with Australia needing 3 to tie and 4 to win off the last ball of the match. There was a full scale pitch invasion with Australian captain Steve Waugh's bat almost being stolen from his grasp and the match deemed a tie, after the West Indies could not effect a run out, due to the stumps having been stolen after Shane Warne had made his ground on the second run. Due to the volatile nature of the crowd, the result was not announced until after the players had left the venue.

It has hosted 30 Test matches and 10 One Day International. Four of the last five Tests at the ground have ended in draws. The ground, which has a capacity of around 10,000, opened in 1884, has seen Test cricket since 1930, and is the only cricket stadium in the world to be situated below sea level. The ground has a moat round it to protect the pitch from flooding. It is the oldest ground in the Caribbean.

The ground did not host matches for the 2007 Cricket World Cup, as a new stadium, the Providence Stadium, was built.

== See also ==
- List of Test cricket grounds
