= Rose Hall, Guyana =

Rose Hall
- Town
- Location in Guyana
- Coordinates: 6.25323°N 57.35712°W
- Country: Guyana
- Region: East Berbice-Corentyne

Population (2012)
  - Total: 4,433
- Time zone: UTC-4
- Climate: Af

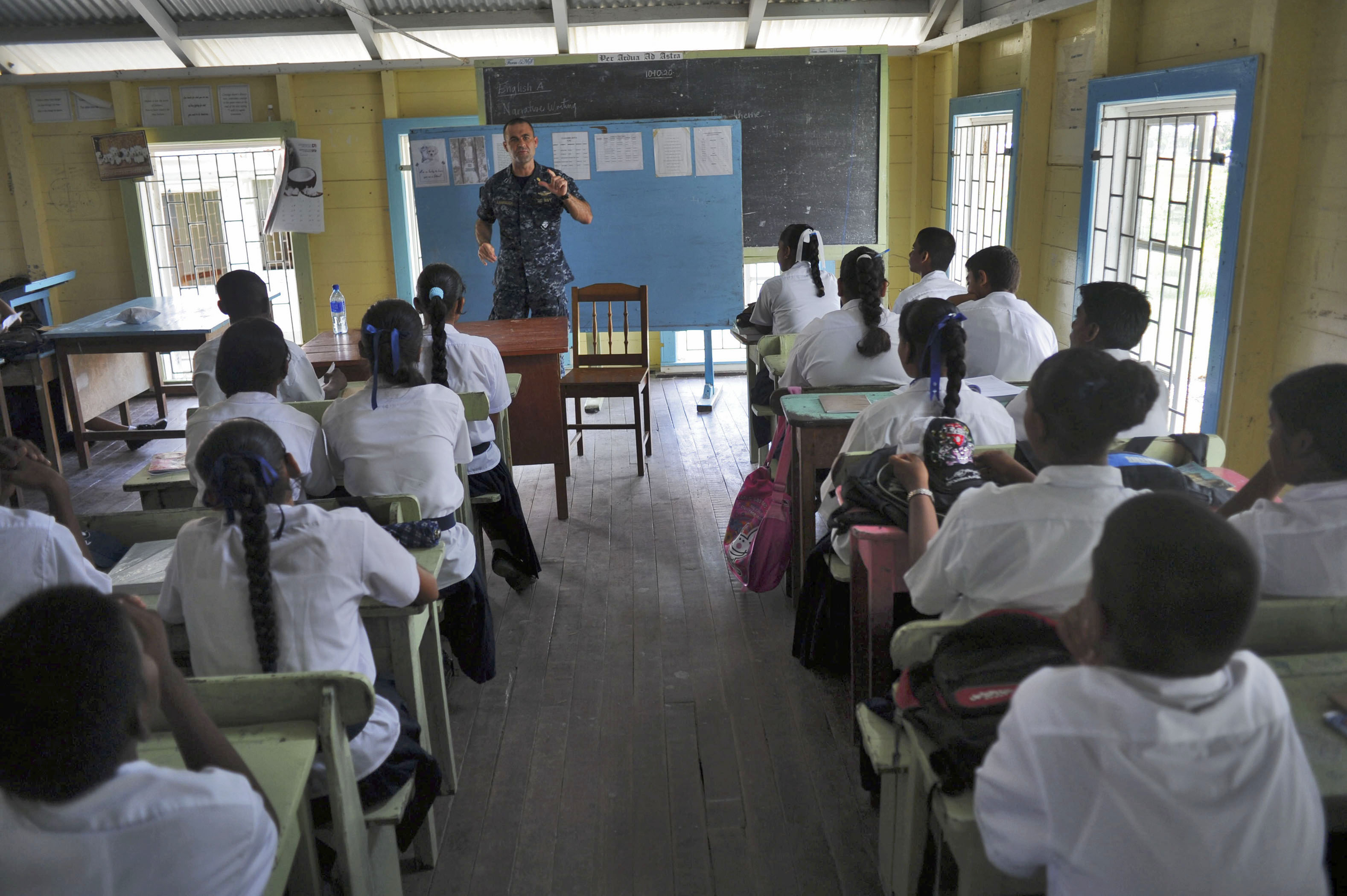
Public health lecture in Rose Hall, Guyana (Oct. 21, 2010)

Rose Hall is a community in the East Berbice-Corentyne Region of Guyana. Rose Hall is 23 kilometres (14 mi) east of New Amsterdam.

== History ==
Rose Hall began as land owned by Dutch planters; it was purchased by former slaves in 1842 and became a village in 1908. During the period after its establishment as a village, the lands of Rose Hall were formally surveyed and divided to normalise ownership among residents. This process was conducted on June 3, 1910, by J.C. Gibson, Esq., acting under governor Frederick Mitchell Hodgson. In 1970, it became a town, celebrating its 50th anniversary on September 21, 2020. It has three wards: Middle Rose Hall, East Rose Hall and Williamsburg, and an area of 13 km^{2} (5 sq mi). Rose hall serves a population of roughly 17,000.

== Points of interest ==
Rose Hall is a hub for the surrounding areas where people buy raw materials for clothing and grocery in the Berbice region. Two banks and stores lined the main public roads. Most of the stores are clothing stores and grocery stores. The Welfare Centre Ground is a cricket ground that formerly held first-class cricket matches.

== Notable residents ==
- J.C. Gibson (1869-1948), Scottish-born estate manager and justice of the peace, associated with founding Port Mourant Cricket Club, and known to have divided Rose Hall village. Manager of the Rose Hall sugar estates from (1895-1905).
- Nezam Hafiz (1969–2001), Guyanese-American cricketer, killed in the September 11, 2001 attacks on New York City.
- Godfrey Edwards (born 1959), Dutch cricketer of Guyanese origin.
- Assad Fudadin Guyanese West Indies cricket player.
