= Oonya Kempadoo =

British-Guyanese novelist (born 1966)

- Born: 1966 (age 59–60); Sussex, England
- Occupation: Novelist
- Writing career
- Language: English
- Notable works: Buxton Spice (1998); Tide Running (2001); All Decent Animals (2013); Naniki (2024)
- Notable awards: Casa de las Américas Prize (2002)
- Website: oonyakempadoo.com

Oonya Kempadoo (born 1966) is a novelist who was born in the United Kingdom of Guyanese parentage, her father being the writer Peter Kempadoo. She is the author of four well received novels: Buxton Spice (1998); Tide Running (2001); All Decent Animals (2013); and Naniki (2024). She is a winner of the Casa de las Américas Prize.

== Biography ==
Oonya Kempadoo was born in Sussex, England. From the age of five, she was raised in Guyana with a culturally Caribbean upbringing. In addition, Oonya is of mixed Indian, African, Scottish, and Amerindian descent, so she was exposed and invited to identify with a wide range of cultures. She has lived in numerous places, primarily residing in Caribbean spaces such as Trinidad, St. Lucia, and Tobago. In St. George’s, Grenada, is where she currently lives.

Rosemary Read and Peter Kempadoo are Oonya’s parents. Notably, Peter Kempadoo was a novelist, known for impactful writing about Guyanese culture. "Hearing him typing away in the night, even though it was no longer fiction he was writing, encouraged me to write and keep writing," Oonya once mentioned in an interview after his passing in 2019. Oonya has eight siblings, Manganta, Kamala Kempadoo, Shamaine, Roshini Kempadoo, Natash, Sanjavie, Valmiki, and Annushka, who was adopted.

In regards to education, Oonya has experience at multiple universities and other rigorous academic programs:

- Studies in Arts in Amsterdam, 1990
- Participation in the International Writing Program's, Fall Residency at the University of Iowa, 2011
- Honorary Degree of Associates in Arts at Connecticut State Colleges & Universities, 2014

== Career ==
Kempadoo began writing in 1997 and her first novel, Buxton Spice, a semi-autobiographical rural coming-of-age story, was published 1998. The New York Times described it as "superb, and superbly written". Her second book, Tide Running (Picador, 2001), set in Plymouth, Tobago, is the story of young brothers Cliff and Ossie. Tide Running won the Casa de las Américas Prize for best English or Creole novel.

Both of these books were nominated for International Dublin Literary Awards, the first in 2000 and the second in 2003. She was named a Great Talent for the Twenty-First Century by the Orange Prize judges and is a winner of the Casa de las Américas Prize.

In 2011, Kempadoo participated in the International Writing Program's Fall Residency at the University of Iowa in Iowa City, IA.

Her third novel All Decent Animals (Farrar, Straus and Giroux, 2013) was recommended on Oprah's 2013 Summer Reading List by Karen Russell, who said: "How am I only now finding out about this writer? It's as if she's inventing her own language, which is incantatory, dense, and lush. The authority and blood pulse of it seduced me."

Naniki was shortlisted for the Governor General's Award for English-language fiction at the 2024 Governor General's Awards.

Over the years, Oonya Kempadoo has accumulated career experience that led her to become, as of 2025, a successful Caribbean woman writer and manager of several projects.

In early 2025, Oonya worked as a part-time researcher for "Little Scooter Media". The company helped sponsor a collaboration with "The Period Purse", a non-profit charity aiming to establish menstrual equity through monetary and period product donations, educational outreach, and other activist methods. Oonya contributed to the organization by taking on the role of the researcher for "The Period Purse's" mini-series, "Historical Periods", an educational segment for the public. At this same time, Oonya was an active consultant of "Little Scooter Media," who was in charge of the media produced.

== Awards and honours ==
=== Literary awards ===
- 2002 – Casa de las Américas Prize for best English or Creole novel, for Tide Running.

=== Nominations and shortlists ===
- 2000 – Nominated for the International Dublin Literary Award for Buxton Spice.
- 2003 – Nominated for the International Dublin Literary Award for Tide Running.
- 2024 – Shortlisted for the Governor General's Award for English-language fiction for Naniki.

=== Other honours ===
- Named a "Great Talent for the 21st Century" by the Orange Prize judges.
- 2014 – Honorary Associate in Arts degree, Connecticut State Colleges & Universities.

== Bibliography ==
- Buxton Spice. W&N, 1998. ISBN 9781861591449 paperback 1st
- Tide Running. Picador, 2001; ISBN 9780330482523 hardcover
- All Decent Animals. Farrar, Straus & Giroux, 2013; ISBN 9780374299712 hardcover 1st
- Naniki. Rare Machines, 2024. ISBN 9781459751491 paperback 1st

== Relevant academic studies ==
- Niles, Glenda. "Translation of Creole in Caribbean English Literature: The Case of Oonya Kempadoo." Translation and Translanguaging in Multilingual Contexts 2, no. 2 (2016): 220-240.
