= Clyde Butts =

West Indian cricketer (1957–2023)

Personal information
- Born: 8 July 1957; Perseverance, British Guiana
- Died: 8 December 2023 (aged 66) near Eccles, Guyana
- Batting: Right-handed
- Bowling: Right-arm off break

International information
- National side: West Indies (1985–1988)
- Test debut: 6 April 1985 v New Zealand
- Last Test: 11 January 1988 v India

Domestic team information
- Years: Team
- 1980/81–1993/94: Guyana
- 1981/82–1989/90: Demerara

Career statistics
Competition	Test	FC	LA
Matches	7	87	32
Runs scored	108	1,431	216
Batting average	15.42	15.90	16.61
100s/50s	0/0	0/2	0/0
Top score	38	57*	37*
Balls bowled	1,554	22,295	1,728
Wickets	10	348	32
Bowling average	59.50	24.19	27.21
5 wickets in innings	0	23	0
10 wickets in match	0	2	0
Best bowling	4/73	7/29	4/25
Catches/stumpings	2/–	42/–	8/–
- Source: Cricinfo, 9 December 2023

Clyde Godfrey Butts (8 July 1957 – 8 December 2023) was a Guyanese cricketer who batted right-handed and bowled off breaks. Later, he became a team selector. In a career spanning 14 seasons, he played 87 first class games, including seven Test matches for the West Indies between 1985 and 1988. He also served as the chairman of West Indies Cricket Board Selection Panel for a brief stint.

== Biography ==
Clyde Godfrey Butts was born in a village called Perseverance as the tenth and last child in his family. "On the rest day of his Test debut in April 1985, [Butts] got married, though arguably, for an offspinner in that fearsome West Indies attack, most days were a rest day."

Butts died in a road accident in Eccles, East Bank Demerara, on 8 December 2023, at age 66. On 9 December 2023, during the third ODI between the West Indies and England, West Indies players wore black armbands to mourn the deaths of Clyde Butts and Joe Solomon.

== Career ==
The West Indies rarely selected spin bowlers when Butts was active – choosing instead to back their four fast bowlers and even ESPN Cricinfo has described the fate of being a West Indian spinner in the 1980s, by comparing it with a trained opera singer in a boy band. He was often sidelined from the West Indies Test team due to the seam bowling attack coupled with the consistent performance of offspinner Roger Harper who was often considered as the first-choice spin bowler for the West Indies test side. He finally received the opportunity to make his test debut during the second Test of the home series against New Zealand on 6 April 1985 and he endured a tough outing with the ball on debut, conceding 113 runs by bowling 47 overs without taking any wicket.

Butts did play five matches on the Indian subcontinent, where teams traditionally select spin bowlers as the pitches are believed to suit them more. It was on the subcontinent that Butts registered his best bowling figures, with four for 73 against Pakistan during the third Test of the series which was played at Karachi in November 1986. He also took the prized wicket of the Pakistani captain and all-rounder Imran Khan and finished with six for 95 in the match, but could not prevent a drawn match and a drawn series. In his next tour of the subcontinent, to India the following season (at the end of December 1986), Butts played three Tests and managed to take only two wickets in the series, and that eventually turned out to be his last series. He also captained Guyana in domestic cricket during the 1980s and predominantly played first-class cricket representing Guyana.

Butts was appointed the head coach of the West Indies under-19 cricket team for the 2004 Under-19 Cricket World Cup. In July 2008, he was appointed a national selector and headed the selection panel of Cricket West Indies. During his stint as the chairman of selectors for Cricket West Indies, West Indies emerged triumphant in the final of the 2012 ICC World Twenty20. He also occasionally spent his career as a commentator in regional and domestic matches in Guyana.
