= John Trim (cricketer) =

West Indian cricketer (1915–1960)

Personal information
- Born: 25 January 1915; Port Mourant, Berbice, British Guiana
- Died: 12 November 1960 (aged 45); New Amsterdam, Berbice, British Guiana
- Batting: Right-handed
- Bowling: Right-arm fast-medium
- Relatives: W.B. Stuger (cousin)

International information
- National side: West Indies
- Test debut (cap 63): 3 March 1948 v England
- Last Test: 31 December 1951 v Australia

Domestic team information
- Years: Team
- 1943/44–1952/53: British Guiana

Career statistics
Competition	Tests	First-class
Matches	4	34
Runs scored	21	386
Batting average	5.25	11.69
100s/50s	0/0	0/1
Top score	12	78*
Balls bowled	794	5898
Wickets	18	95
Bowling average	16.16	30.32
5 wickets in innings	1	4
10 wickets in match	0	1
Best bowling	5/34	7/80
Catches/stumpings	2/0	17/0
- Source: CricInfo, 31 March 2014

John Trim (25 January 1915 – 12 November 1960) was a Guyanese cricketer who played in four Tests from 1948 to 1952 for West Indies. A barrel-chested right-arm fast-medium bowler and right-handed lower-order batsman from Berbice, British Guiana, Trim's brief international career yielded 18 wickets at one of the lowest bowling averages of any completed career – 16.16 runs per wicket. In his first class career from 1944 to 1953 he played 34 matches, mostly for British Guiana, taking 96 wickets and making a solitary half-century with the bat.

Trim's Test debut came during the 1947–48 tour of the West Indies by Gubby Allen's England team. Trim took two wickets for an economical six runs in his first outing, with a further wicket in England's second innings. It was Trim's only match of the series, but he would tour India in January 1949, taking 4/48 and 3/28 in Chennai and 3/69 in Mumbai. He was then selected for the West Indian tour of Australia 1951–52 and took his career-best figures: a maiden five wicket haul of 5/35 at the Melbourne Cricket Ground. His omission from the 1950 touring party to England created “an almighty row” and almost led to the British Guiana Cricket Association boycotting the tour.

Trim was the first Berbician to play Test cricket. He continued to play cricket in the Caribbean until 1953. He died in New Amsterdam, Berbice.

== Sources ==
- George, M. (2012) A time in our history: Berbice Cricket from 1939 to 2012, Lulu.com.
