= Joe Solomon =

West Indian cricketer (1930–2023)

- Solomon in 2016

Personal information
- Full name: Joseph Stanislaus Solomon
- Born: 24 August 1930; Port Mourant, Berbice, British Guiana
- Died: 8 December 2023 (aged 93); Richmond Hill, Queens, New York City, New York, U.S.
- Batting: Right-handed
- Bowling: Leg-break

International information
- National side: West Indies
- Test debut: 12 December 1958 v India
- Last Test: 5 May 1965 v Australia

Career statistics
Competition	Test	First-class
Matches	27	104
Runs scored	1,326	5,318
Batting average	34.00	41.54
100s/50s	1/9	12/27
Top score	100*	201*
Balls bowled	702	3,659
Wickets	4	51
Bowling average	67.00	38.23
5 wickets in innings	0	0
10 wickets in match	0	0
Best bowling	1/20	4/28
Catches/stumpings	13/–	46/–
- Source: ESPNcricinfo, 14 January 2017

Joseph Stanislaus Solomon, AA (26 August 1930 – 8 December 2023) was a Guyanese cricketer who played 27 Test matches for the West Indies from 1958 to 1965, scoring 1,326 runs, mainly from number six and seven in the batting line-up. He also bowled occasional leg-breaks but was best known as a brilliant fieldsman. He was best remembered for his role in the famous Tied Test match between the West Indies and Australia in 1960 at the Gabba, where he was involved in two direct hit runout dismissals.

== Career ==
=== First-class breakthrough and Test debut ===
Solomon began playing first-class cricket late in his career at the age of 26 and made his first-class debut in the 1956/57 season against Jamaica. He scored a century on his first-class debut by notching up an unbeaten knock of 114 against Jamaica. He followed it up with two more centuries in his next two first-class innings against Barbados and against a touring Pakistan side. He was the first player in first-class cricket history (the only player in first-class cricket history to this date) to score hundreds in his first three innings, playing for British Guiana in 1956–57 and 1957–58.

He was selected to tour India in 1958–59 with the West Indies team following his impressive performances at first-class level. He made his Test debut on 12 December 1958 during the Indian tour, in the second Test of the series which was played in Kanpur. He had a memorable Test debut by scoring 45 runs in the first innings and following it up with a knock of 86 in the second innings before being run out and the West Indies secured a victory by a margin of 203 runs. He eventually missed out on an opportunity to score a Test century on debut and missed out on creating a unique record of being one of the few players to achieve the double of reaching centuries on both first-class and Test match debuts. He scored his maiden Test century in the fifth Test of the series at Delhi and finished his debut Test series on a high note with an aggregate of 351 runs at an average of 117.00. His highest first-class score was 201 not out for Berbice against the touring MCC in March 1960, when he added an unbroken partnership of 290 with Basil Butcher.

=== Tied Test 1960 and beyond ===
Solomon was less successful in later series, but he often batted steadily when the need was greatest.

During the first Test match of the series between the West Indies and Australia at Brisbane in December 1960, he played an instrumental role in engineering the first ever tied Test. He scored 65 in West Indies first innings batting at number six position and also scored a vital innings of 47 in West Indies second innings. Australia were set a target of 233 and Australia were poised for a victorious occasion, especially after posting a mammoth 505 runs on the board in the first innings in reply to West Indies first innings total of 453. However, the match came down to the wire and at one stage, Australia were all set for a possible victory when they needed to score five runs in the final eight-ball over with three wickets remaining in the innings. Australia's hopes began to fade away at the critical juncture of the match, when both Richie Benaud and Wally Grout fell in quick succession. Australia were left with a precarious situation where they had to score one run off the last two balls with only one wicket to spare and on the other hand, Wes Hall bowled the penultimate over of the match. Australia's tail-ender batsman Lindsay Kline walked to bat as the last batsman to score the winning run and he nudged the first delivery he faced towards the square leg with the intention to sneak a quick single. The ball went into the safe hands of Joe Solomon who grabbed the ball to effect a pickup throw from square leg, and his throw hit the stumps directly to run out Ian Meckiff, as the latter was going for the winning run by charging down towards the wicket-keeper's end. In the next Test played at Melbourne, he was promoted to open the batting, but he fell cheaply in both innings of the match and he was dismissed out hit wicket off the bowling of Richie Benaud after his cap fell on the stumps as it happened during the second innings.

Solomon continued to serve Guyanese cricket in various capacities after he retired from playing, including the presidency of the Guyana Cricket Board and several years as a selector. He was awarded the Golden Arrow of Achievement (AA) by the Government of Guyana. He and his wife Betty had six children. He lived in New York from 1984, travelling back to Guyana once a year.

== Personal life ==
Solomon was born in Port Mourant, Berbice, British Guiana (now Guyana) on 24 August 1930. He died in Richmond Hill Queens, New York, USA on 8 December 2023, at the age of 93. Until his death he was the oldest living West Indies Test cricketer. On 9 December 2023, during the third ODI between West Indies and England, West Indies players wore black armbands to mourn the deaths of Joe Solomon and Clyde Butts and a minute's silence was observed prior to the start of the match.
