= Randolph Ramnarace =

Guyanese cricketer

Personal information
- Born: 25 July 1941 (age 85); Skeldon, Berbice, British Guiana
- Batting: Right-handed
- Bowling: Right-arm medium-pace

Domestic team information
- Years: Team
- 1960-61 to 1973-74: Berbice
- 1965-66 to 1972-73: Guyana

Career statistics
Competition	First-class
Matches	28
Runs scored	972
Batting average	22.60
100s/50s	0/6
Top score	71
Balls bowled	4926
Wickets	75
Bowling average	31.14
5 wickets in innings	1
10 wickets in match	0
Best bowling	6/101
Catches/stumpings	15/–
- Source: Cricket Archive, 17 January 2016

Randolph Ramnarace (born 25 July 1941) is a former first-class cricketer from Berbice who played mostly for Guyana.

Ramnarace, a middle-order batsman and medium-paced bowler, was a regular member of the British Guiana/Guyana team from 1965–66 to 1972–73. He never quite made enough runs or took enough wickets to warrant selection for the West Indies Test team, although he played for the Rest of the World team that made a short tour of England in 1968, when he also played regularly for the International Cavaliers as well as taking 59 wickets at an average of 14.42 to lead the Surrey Second XI attack to the Second XI Championship.

He played Lancashire League cricket as the professional for Colne in 1969. He was the leading bowler in the Worsley Cup, which Colne won, taking 19 wickets at an average of 8.57.

Ramnarace's highest first-class score was 71, Guyana's highest score in the match, against Jamaica during the 1968–69 Shell Shield season. His best first-class bowling figures were 6 for 101 for Berbice against Demerara in the Jones Cup in 1971–72.
