= Ivan Madray =

West Indian cricketer (1934–2009)

Cricket information
- Batting: Right-handed
- Bowling: Legbreak

International information
- National side: West Indies
- Test debut: 5 February 1958 v Pakistan
- Last Test: 13 March 1958 v Pakistan

Career statistics
Competition	Test	First-class
Matches	2	6
Runs scored	3	73
Batting average	1.00	9.12
100s/50s	0/0	0/0
Top score	2	28
Balls bowled	210	1,304
Wickets	0	16
Bowling average	–	38.87
5 wickets in innings	–	0
10 wickets in match	–	0
Best bowling	–	4/61
Catches/stumpings	2/–	5/–
- Source: CricInfo, 30 October 2022

Ivan Samuel Madray (2 July 1934 – 23 April 2009) was a West Indian cricketer who played in two Test matches in 1958.

A leg-spinner, Madray made his first-class debut for British Guiana against the visiting Australians in 1954–55 at the age of 20, taking 3 for 122 (the wickets of Neil Harvey, Peter Burge and Ron Archer) in 23 overs.

He played two matches in 1956–57, taking 4 for 168 off 84 overs against Jamaica, then 4 for 61 and 1 for 18 against Barbados in the final of the Quadrangular Tournament.

His next first-class match was his Test debut in the Second Test against Pakistan in Port of Spain in February 1958, when he and the off-spinner Lance Gibbs (who was also from British Guiana) both played their first Tests. Madray bowled only 18 overs and took no wickets, and made 1 and 0, but West Indies won. He was left out of the Third Test, which West Indies also won, but he took four wickets (including Hanif Mohammad and Saeed Ahmed) against the Pakistanis when they played British Guiana, and returned for the Fourth Test on his home ground in Georgetown. He bowled 16 overs for no wickets and made 2 in his only innings, and that was the end of his first-class career.

He played local cricket for Penzance in Cornwall in 1959 and Minor Counties cricket for Lincolnshire from 1963 to 1967, where he was more prominent as a batsman, with a top score of 154 (but no wickets) in a victory over Cambridgeshire in 1964.

In 1960 Madray moved to Grimsby, Lincolnshire as signed as the overseas professional for Ross Sports Group. In the 7 seasons he played for Ross he had much success, winning the batting award in the first season of the Lincolnshire County Cricket League in 1963 and repeating the feat in 1964. He scored over 4,000 runs for Ross Sports in the 7 seasons, with 11 centuries.

In the 4 years he played for Lincolnshire he scored 2329 runs in 55 matches with 6 centuries and 1 5 wicket haul.

In the 1968 Madray moved to Shropshire but still continued to come back to Lincolnshire once a year to play in the annual "Cavailiers" match.

He later lived in the United States.
