= Basil Butcher =

West Indian cricketer

Personal information
- Full name: Basil Fitzherbert Butcher
- Born: 3 September 1933; Port Mourant, Berbice, British Guiana
- Died: 16 December 2019 (aged 86); Florida, United States
- Batting: Right-handed
- Bowling: Leg break
- Role: Batsman

International information
- National side: West Indies
- Test debut (cap 103): 28 November 1958 v India
- Last Test: 10 July 1969 v England

Domestic team information
- Years: Team
- 1955–1966: British Guiana
- 1960–1971: Berbice
- 1967–1971: Guyana

Career statistics
Competition	Test	First-class
Matches	44	169
Runs scored	3,104	11,628
Batting average	43.11	49.90
100s/50s	7/16	31/54
Top score	209*	209*
Balls bowled	256	2,252
Wickets	5	40
Bowling average	18.00	30.42
5 wickets in innings	1	1
10 wickets in match	0	0
Best bowling	5/34	5/34
Catches/stumpings	15/–	67/–
- Source: CricketArchive, 29 December 2017

Basil Fitzherbert Butcher (3 September 1933 – 16 December 2019) was a Guyanese cricketer who played for the West Indies cricket team. He was regarded as a reliable right-handed middle-order batsman in the star-studded West Indian batting line-up of the 1960s. Australian cricketer and media personality Richie Benaud regarded him as the most difficult of the West Indian batsmen to dismiss.

== Early life ==
Butcher was born and raised on a sugar estate just outside the village of Port Mourant, in what was then British Guiana. Although Port Mourant was a small village, it produced a number of notable cricketers. Butcher was a neighbour of Alvin Kallicharran's family, while future Test teammates Rohan Kanhai and Joe Solomon lived nearby. He left Corentyne High School without completing his education and worked in a variety of jobs, including as a teacher, a clerk in the Public Works Department, an insurance salesman and a welfare officer, while playing cricket for Port Mourant Sports Club. Butcher's father was from Barbados and was of Indo-Trinidadian descent through his grandmother, who was East Indian.

== Test career ==
Butcher was selected for the 1958–59 tour to India and made his Test debut along with Wes Hall in the first Test at Brabourne Stadium. He scored 28 and 64 not out, batting with Kanhai as a runner and sharing a 134-run stand with Garfield Sobers before the West Indies declared. The match ended in a draw. Butcher scored his maiden Test century in the third Test at Eden Gardens, which the West Indies won by an innings and 336 runs. He was one of three batsmen to score a century in the West Indies innings, finishing with 103 in three hours with 15 fours, and sharing a 217-run partnership with Kanhai which lasted just over three hours. He backed up with a second consecutive century in the Fourth Test at Madras, scoring 142 in just over five-and-a-half hours with 10 fours, playing a key role in the West Indies' series-clinching victory. He finished the series with 486 runs at an average of 69.42.

He struggled until the 1963 tour of England, where he rediscovered his form by making 383 runs which included an innings of 133 from a team total of just 229, helping the West Indies to a draw at Lord's. The innings became legendary because during the interval he had received news through a letter that his wife had had a miscarriage back home in Guyana. He made his highest Test score at Trent Bridge in 1966. West Indies trailed England by 90 on the first innings, but Butcher made 209 not out in the second, adding 173 in two hours with Sobers, who then declared, and West Indies went on to win by 139 runs.

Butcher was an occasional leg-spinner. He took five Test wickets, which all came in the one innings, 5 for 34 against England at Port-of-Spain in 1967–68. He was West Indies' highest scorer in the series in England in 1969, with 238 runs at an average of 39.66, and was made a Wisden Cricketer of the Year in 1970. He retired after the series.

== Life after cricket ==
Butcher worked as a Public Relations Officer at Guymine, a bauxite company in Guyana.

Butcher died in Florida, United States, on 16 December 2019, after a long period of illness. His son wrote on Facebook:

With a heavy heart I announce our Dad, Husband, Brother, Grandfather, Great-Grandfather and former Guyana and West Indies batting star Basil Butcher Sr. passed earlier this evening in Florida after a long illness.

— Basil Butcher Jr,

Cricket West Indies tweeted:

Sad news for the West Indies Cricket Family. Former Guyana and West Indies batsman Basil Butcher died earlier today (Monday) in Florida, according to his son Basil Butcher jr.,

— Cricket West Indies,
