= Associate international cricket in 2025 =

International cricket season

The 2025 Associate international cricket season included series starting from April to September 2025. All official 20-over matches between associate members of the ICC were eligible to have full men's Twenty20 International or women's Twenty20 International (T20I) status, as the International Cricket Council (ICC) granted T20I status to matches between all of its members from 1 July 2018 (women's teams) and 1 January 2019 (men's teams). The season included all T20I cricket series mostly involving ICC Associate members, that were played in addition to series covered in International cricket in 2025.

== Season overview ==
=== Men's events ===
International tours
| Start date | Home team | Away team | Results [Matches] |
| Start date | Home team | Away team | T20I |
|---|---|---|---|
| 7 April 2025 | Portugal | Norway | 2–1 [3] |
| 6 May 2025 | Malta | Estonia | 2–1 [3] |
| 13 May 2025 | Japan | Cook Islands | 2–0 [2] |
| 17 May 2025 | Austria | Slovenia | 4–0 [4] |
| 30 May 2025 | Austria | Switzerland | 3–1 [4] |
| 6 June 2025 | Jersey | Guernsey | 2–1 [3] |
| 7 June 2025 | Serbia | Slovenia | 3–0 [3] |
| 11 June 2025 | Indonesia | Cambodia | 2–5 [8] |
| 15 June 2025 | (Denmark) Finland | Norway | 1–0 [1] |
| 21 June 2025 | Hungary | Slovenia | 3–0 [3] |
| 21 June 2025 | Luxembourg | Switzerland | 1–2 [3] |
| 18 July 2025 | Qatar | Saudi Arabia | 3–2 [5] |
| 25 July 2025 | Estonia | Finland | 1–2 [3] |
| 2 August 2025 | Estonia | Switzerland | 0–3 [3] |
| 7 August 2025 | Croatia | Cyprus | 0–4 [4] |
| 14 August 2025 | Guernsey | Papua New Guinea | 0–1 [1] |
| 21 August 2025 | Romania | Czech Republic | 2–2 [4] |
| 23 August 2025 | Austria | Belgium | 4–0 [4] |
| 30 August 2025 | Guernsey | Switzerland | 1–0 [3] |
| 6 September 2025 | Isle of Man | Sweden | 0–2 [4] |
| 12 September 2025 | Eswatini | Mozambique | 4–0 [5] |
International tournaments
| Start date | Tournament | | Winners |
| 9 April 2025 | 2025 Hong Kong Quadrangular Series | | Kuwait |
| 17 April 2025 | (Panama) 2025 Men's Central American Championship | | Panama; Mexico |
| 19 April 2025 | (Cayman Islands) 2025 North American Cup | | United States |
| 24 April 2025 | 2025 Malaysia Open T20I Quadrangular Series | | Malaysia |
| 7 May 2025 | (Japan) 2025 Men's Sano City International Tri-Series | | Thailand |
| 30 May 2025 | (Belgium) 2025 Men's Mdina Cup | | Belgium |
| 8 June 2025 | (Czech Republic) 2025 Men's Central Europe Cup | | Austria |
| 11 June 2025 | (Canada) 2025 No Frills T20I series | | —N/a |
| 13 June 2025 | (Denmark) 2025 Men's Nordic Cup | | Denmark |
| 15 June 2025 | 2025 Scotland T20I Tri-Nation Series | | Scotland |
| 15 June 2025 | (Canada) 2025 Men's T20 World Cup Americas Regional Final | | Canada |
| 26 June 2025 | (Romania) 2025 Men's Continental Cup | | Malta |
| 5 July 2025 | (Netherlands) 2025 Men's T20 World Cup Europe Regional Final | | Netherlands |
| 5 July 2025 | 2025 Malawi Quad Nations T20 Cup | | Tanzania |
| 6 July 2025 | (Indonesia) 2025 Rising Asia Tri-Series | | Philippines |
| 10 July 2025 | 2025 Bulgaria Tri-Nation Series | | Bulgaria |
| 17 July 2025 | (Uganda) 2025 Pearl of Africa T20 Series | | Uganda |
| 18 July 2025 | (Singapore) 2025 Asia Pacific Cricket Champions Trophy | | Malaysia |
| 18 July 2025 | 2025 Rwanda Tri-Nation Series | | Bahrain |
| 25 July 2025 | (Hungary) 2025 Budapest Cup | | Austria |
| 26 July 2025 | (Estonia) 2025 Baltic Cup | | Estonia |
| 7 August 2025 | (Sweden) 2025 Viking Cup | | Austria |
| 17 August 2025 | 2025 Norway Tri-Nation Series | | Norway |
| 29 August 2025 | (Hungary) 2025 Eastern Europe Cup | | Hungary |

=== Women's events ===
International tours
| Start date | Home team | Away team | Results [Matches] |
| Start date | Home team | Away team | WT20I |
|---|---|---|---|
| 7 April 2025 | Portugal | Norway | 2–1 [3] |
| 8 April 2025 | Namibia | Uganda | 3–3 [6] |
| 2 May 2025 | Oman | Bahrain | 3–0 [3] |
| 2 May 2025 | Czech Republic | Cyprus | 0–5 [5] |
| 5 May 2025 | Malta | Croatia | 2–0 [2] |
| 10 May 2025 | Greece | Germany | 0–4 [4] |
| 15 May 2025 | Estonia | Bulgaria | 3–0 [3] |
| 28 May 2025 | Belgium | Switzerland | 0–4 [4] |
| 7 June 2025 | Netherlands | United States | 4–0 [5] |
| 2 July 2025 | Singapore | Indonesia | 0–2 [3] |
| 5 July 2025 | Guernsey | Jersey | 0–1 [1] |
| 2 August 2025 | Estonia | Gibraltar | 1–2 [3] |
| 13 August 2025 | Singapore | Cambodia | 3–0 [3] |
| 5 September 2025 | Fiji | Japan | 0–2 [2] |
| 6 September 2025 | Estonia | Czech Republic | 3–0 [3] |
International tournaments
| Start date | Tournament | | Winners |
| 9 April 2025 | (Indonesia) 2025 Kartini Cup | | Indonesia |
| 18 April 2025 | 2025 Cyprus Women's Quadrangular Series | | Jersey |
| 26 April 2025 | (Botswana) 2025 Kalahari Women's Tournament | | Sierra Leone |
| 3 May 2025 | 2025 Thailand Women's Quadrangular Series | | Thailand |
| 9 May 2025 | (Thailand) 2025 Women's T20 World Cup Asia Qualifier | | Thailand |
| 25 May 2025 | (Italy) 2025 Women's T20 World Cup Europe Qualifier Division Two | | Italy |
| 3 June 2025 | (Japan) 2025 Women's Sano City International Trophy | | Japan |
| 3 June 2025 | (Rwanda) 2025 Kwibuka Women's T20 Tournament | | Tanzania |
| 11 June 2025 | (Czech Republic) 2025 Women's Central Europe Cup | | Austria |
| 15 June 2025 | (Papua New Guinea) 2025 Women's PacificAus Sports Invitational | | Papua New Guinea |
| 7 July 2025 | 2025 Bulgaria Women's Quadrangular Series | | Turkey |
| 18 July 2025 | 2025 Finland Women's Tri-Series | | Switzerland |
| 20 July 2025 | (Botswana) 2025 Women's T20 World Cup Africa Qualifier Division Two | | Rwanda |
| 20 August 2025 | (Netherlands) 2025 Women's T20 World Cup Europe Qualifier Division One | | Ireland |
| 29 August 2025 | (Denmark) 2025 Women's Nordic Cup | | Germany |
| 31 August 2025 | (Namibia) 2025 Women's T20 World Cup Africa Qualifier Division One | | Zimbabwe |
| 31 August 2025 | (England) 2025 UK Women's Tri-Nation Series | | Brazil |
| 9 September 2025 | (Fiji) 2025 Women's T20 World Cup EAP Qualifier | | Papua New Guinea |
| 12 September 2025 | 2025 Luxembourg Women's Tri-Nation Series | | Switzerland |

== April ==
=== Norway women in Portugal ===
WT20I series
| No. | Date | Venue | Result |
|---|---|---|---|
| WT20I 2223 | 7 April | Santarem Cricket Ground, Albergaria | Portugal by 16 runs |
| WT20I 2224 | 8 April | Santarem Cricket Ground, Albergaria | Norway by 5 wickets |
| WT20I 2227 | 9 April | Santarem Cricket Ground, Albergaria | Portugal by 9 wickets |

=== Norway in Portugal ===
T20I series
| No. | Date | Venue | Result |
|---|---|---|---|
| T20I 3129 | 7 April | Santarem Cricket Ground, Albergaria | Norway by 39 runs |
| T20I 3130 | 8 April | Santarem Cricket Ground, Albergaria | Portugal by 4 wickets |
| T20I 3133 | 9 April | Santarem Cricket Ground, Albergaria | Portugal by 54 runs |

=== Uganda women in Namibia ===
WT20I series
| No. | Date | Venue | Result |
|---|---|---|---|
| WT20I 2225 | 8 April | High Performance Oval, Windhoek | Uganda by 2 runs |
| WT20I 2228 | 9 April | High Performance Oval, Windhoek | Uganda by 5 runs |
| WT20I 2231 | 11 April | High Performance Oval, Windhoek | Namibia by 23 runs |
| WT20I 2233 | 12 April | High Performance Oval, Windhoek | Namibia by 21 runs |
| WT20I 2234 | 14 April | High Performance Oval, Windhoek | Namibia by 1 run |
| WT20I 2235 | 15 April | High Performance Oval, Windhoek | Uganda by 5 wickets |

=== 2025 Kartini Cup ===
| Pos | Team | Pld | W | L | T | NR | Pts | NRR |
|---|---|---|---|---|---|---|---|---|
| 1 | Indonesia | 3 | 3 | 0 | 0 | 0 | 6 | 3.501 |
| 2 | Cook Islands | 3 | 2 | 1 | 0 | 0 | 4 | 0.421 |
| 3 | AIWCA | 3 | 1 | 2 | 0 | 0 | 2 | −0.670 |
| 4 | Philippines | 3 | 0 | 3 | 0 | 0 | 0 | −2.252 |

Source: CricClubs

Round-robin
| No. | Date | Team 1 | Team 2 | Venue | Result |
|---|---|---|---|---|---|
| WT20I 2226 | 9 April | Indonesia | Cook Islands | Udayana Cricket Ground, Jimbaran | Indonesia by 8 wickets |
| 2nd Match | 9 April | AIWCA | Philippines | Udayana Cricket Ground, Jimbaran | AIWCA won by 8 wickets |
| WT20I 2229 | 10 April | Indonesia | Philippines | Udayana Cricket Ground, Jimbaran | Indonesia by 76 runs |
| 4th Match | 10 April | AIWCA | Cook Islands | Udayana Cricket Ground, Jimbaran | Cook Islands by 35 runs |
| 5th Match | 11 April | Indonesia | AIWCA | Udayana Cricket Ground, Jimbaran | Indonesia by 8 wickets |
| WT20I 2230 | 11 April | Cook Islands | Philippines | Udayana Cricket Ground, Jimbaran | Cook Islands by 38 runs |
Third-place play-off
| 7th Match | 12 April | AIWCA | Philippines | Udayana Cricket Ground, Jimbaran | AIWCA won by 69 runs |
Final
| WT20I 2232 | 12 April | Indonesia | Cook Islands | Udayana Cricket Ground, Jimbaran | Indonesia by 3 wickets |

=== 2025 Hong Kong Quadrangular Series ===
| Pos | Team | Pld | W | L | NR | Pts | NRR |
|---|---|---|---|---|---|---|---|
| 1 | Nepal | 3 | 2 | 0 | 1 | 5 | 1.088 |
| 2 | Kuwait | 3 | 2 | 1 | 0 | 4 | 1.797 |
| 3 | Hong Kong | 3 | 1 | 1 | 1 | 3 | 1.377 |
| 4 | Qatar | 3 | 0 | 3 | 0 | 0 | −3.437 |

Source: ESPNcricinfo

Round-robin
| No. | Date | Team 1 | Team 2 | Venue | Result |
|---|---|---|---|---|---|
| T20I 3131 | 9 April | Nepal | Qatar | Mission Road Ground, Mong Kok | Nepal by 8 wickets |
| T20I 3132 | 9 April | Hong Kong | Kuwait | Mission Road Ground, Mong Kok | Kuwait by 4 wickets |
| T20I 3134 | 10 April | Kuwait | Nepal | Mission Road Ground, Mong Kok | Nepal by 6 wickets |
| T20I 3135 | 10 April | Hong Kong | Qatar | Mission Road Ground, Mong Kok | Hong Kong by 68 runs |
| T20I 3136 | 12 April | Kuwait | Qatar | Mission Road Ground, Mong Kok | Kuwait by 6 wickets |
| T20I 3137 | 12 April | Hong Kong | Nepal | Mission Road Ground, Mong Kok | No result |
Third-place play-off
| T20I 3138 | 13 April | Hong Kong | Qatar | Mission Road Ground, Mong Kok | Hong Kong by 1 run |
Final
| T20I 3139 | 13 April | Kuwait | Nepal | Mission Road Ground, Mong Kok | Kuwait by 3 runs |

=== 2025 Men's Central American Championship ===
| Pos | Team | Pld | W | L | NR | Pts | NRR |
|---|---|---|---|---|---|---|---|
| 1 | Panama | 3 | 3 | 0 | 0 | 6 | 1.991 |
| 2 | Mexico | 3 | 2 | 1 | 0 | 4 | 2.693 |
| 3 | Turks and Caicos Islands | 3 | 1 | 2 | 0 | 2 | −0.267 |
| 4 | Costa Rica | 3 | 0 | 3 | 0 | 0 | −5.185 |

Source: ESPNcricinfo

Round-robin
| No. | Date | Team 1 | Team 2 | Venue | Result |
|---|---|---|---|---|---|
| T20I 3140 | 17 April | Costa Rica | Mexico | Clayton, Panama City | Mexico by 124 runs |
| T20I 3141 | 17 April | Panama | Turks and Caicos Islands | Clayton, Panama City | Panama by 49 runs |
| T20I 3142 | 18 April | Panama | Costa Rica | Clayton, Panama City | Panama by 9 wickets |
| T20I 3143 | 18 April | Mexico | Turks and Caicos Islands | Clayton, Panama City | Mexico by 8 wickets |
| T20I 3145 | 19 April | Costa Rica | Turks and Caicos Islands | Clayton, Panama City | Turks and Caicos Islands by 10 wickets |
| T20I 3147 | 19 April | Panama | Mexico | Clayton, Panama City | Panama by 6 runs |
Third-place play-off
| T20I 3149 | 20 April | Costa Rica | Turks and Caicos Islands | Clayton, Panama City | Costa Rica by 21 runs (DLS) |
Final
| T20I 3150a | 20 April | Panama | Mexico | Clayton, Panama City | Match abandoned |

=== 2025 Cyprus Women's Quadrangular Series ===
| Pos | Team | Pld | W | L | NR | Pts | NRR |
|---|---|---|---|---|---|---|---|
| 1 | Jersey | 6 | 6 | 0 | 0 | 12 | 5.364 |
| 2 | Isle of Man | 6 | 3 | 3 | 0 | 6 | 0.485 |
| 3 | Denmark | 6 | 3 | 3 | 0 | 6 | −1.706 |
| 4 | Cyprus | 6 | 0 | 6 | 0 | 0 | −3.382 |

Source: ESPNcricinfo

Round-robin
| No. | Date | Team 1 | Team 2 | Venue | Result |
|---|---|---|---|---|---|
| WT20I 2236 | 18 April | Cyprus | Jersey | Happy Valley Ground, Episkopi | Jersey by 8 wickets |
| WT20I 2237 | 18 April | Denmark | Isle of Man | Happy Valley Ground 2, Episkopi | Isle of Man by 3 wickets |
| WT20I 2238 | 18 April | Denmark | Jersey | Happy Valley Ground, Episkopi | Jersey by 145 runs |
| WT20I 2239 | 18 April | Cyprus | Isle of Man | Happy Valley Ground 2, Episkopi | Isle of Man by 106 runs |
| WT20I 2240 | 19 April | Isle of Man | Jersey | Happy Valley Ground 2, Episkopi | Jersey by 8 wickets |
| WT20I 2241 | 19 April | Cyprus | Denmark | Happy Valley Ground, Episkopi | Denmark by 7 wickets |
| WT20I 2242 | 19 April | Cyprus | Jersey | Happy Valley Ground, Episkopi | Jersey by 76 runs |
| WT20I 2243 | 19 April | Denmark | Isle of Man | Happy Valley Ground 2, Episkopi | Denmark by 3 wickets |
| WT20I 2244 | 20 April | Denmark | Jersey | Happy Valley Ground 2, Episkopi | Jersey by 8 wickets |
| WT20I 2245 | 20 April | Cyprus | Isle of Man | Happy Valley Ground, Episkopi | Isle of Man by 61 runs |
| WT20I 2246 | 20 April | Isle of Man | Jersey | Happy Valley Ground, Episkopi | Jersey by 9 wickets |
| WT20I 2247 | 20 April | Cyprus | Denmark | Happy Valley Ground 2, Episkopi | Denmark by 3 wickets |

=== 2025 North American Cup ===
| Pos | Team | Pld | W | L | T | NR | Pts | NRR | Qualification |
|---|---|---|---|---|---|---|---|---|---|
| 1 | Canada | 4 | 4 | 0 | 0 | 0 | 8 | 3.291 | Semi-finals |
| 2 | United States | 4 | 3 | 1 | 0 | 0 | 6 | 4.399 | Semi-finals |
| 3 | Bermuda | 4 | 2 | 2 | 0 | 0 | 4 | 0.052 | Semi-finals |
| 4 | Cayman Islands (H) | 4 | 1 | 3 | 0 | 0 | 2 | −1.550 | Semi-finals |
| 5 | Bahamas | 4 | 0 | 4 | 0 | 0 | 0 | −6.131 | |

Source: ESPNcricinfo
(H) Host

Round-robin
| No. | Date | Team 1 | Team 2 | Venue | Result |
|---|---|---|---|---|---|
| T20I 3144 | 19 April | Cayman Islands | United States | Jimmy Powell Oval, George Town | United States by 79 runs |
| T20I 3146 | 19 April | Bermuda | Canada | Jimmy Powell Oval, George Town | Canada by 5 wickets |
| T20I 3148 | 20 April | Bahamas | United States | Jimmy Powell Oval, George Town | United States by 149 runs |
| T20I 3150 | 20 April | Cayman Islands | Bermuda | Jimmy Powell Oval, George Town | Bermuda by 30 runs |
| T20I 3151 | 21 April | Bahamas | Canada | Jimmy Powell Oval, George Town | Canada by 10 wickets |
| T20I 3152 | 21 April | Bermuda | United States | Jimmy Powell Oval, George Town | United States by 10 wickets |
| T20I 3153 | 23 April | Cayman Islands | Canada | Jimmy Powell Oval, George Town | Canada by 94 runs |
| T20I 3154 | 23 April | Bahamas | Bermuda | Jimmy Powell Oval, George Town | Bermuda by 10 wickets |
| T20I 3157 | 24 April | Cayman Islands | Bahamas | Jimmy Powell Oval, George Town | Cayman Islands by 79 runs |
| T20I 3158 | 24 April | Canada | United States | Jimmy Powell Oval, George Town | Canada by 17 runs |
Semi-finals
| T20I 3163 | 26 April | Cayman Islands | Canada | Jimmy Powell Oval, George Town | Canada by 10 wickets |
| T20I 3164 | 26 April | Bermuda | United States | Jimmy Powell Oval, George Town | United States by 10 wickets |
Final
| T20I 3165 | 27 April | Canada | United States | Jimmy Powell Oval, George Town | United States by 6 wickets |

=== 2025 Malaysia Open T20I Quadrangular Series ===
| Pos | Team | Pld | W | L | NR | Pts | NRR |
|---|---|---|---|---|---|---|---|
| 1 | Saudi Arabia | 6 | 5 | 1 | 0 | 10 | 2.264 |
| 2 | Malaysia | 6 | 4 | 1 | 1 | 9 | 1.569 |
| 3 | Singapore | 6 | 1 | 3 | 2 | 4 | −2.172 |
| 4 | Thailand | 6 | 0 | 5 | 1 | 1 | −2.650 |

Source: ESPNcricinfo

Round-robin
| No. | Date | Team 1 | Team 2 | Venue | Result |
|---|---|---|---|---|---|
| T20I 3155 | 24 April | Malaysia | Singapore | Bayuemas Oval, Pandamaran | Malaysia by 28 runs |
| T20I 3156 | 24 April | Saudi Arabia | Thailand | Bayuemas Oval, Pandamaran | Saudi Arabia by 66 runs |
| T20I 3159 | 25 April | Malaysia | Thailand | Bayuemas Oval, Pandamaran | Malaysia by 7 wickets |
| T20I 3160 | 25 April | Saudi Arabia | Singapore | Bayuemas Oval, Pandamaran | Saudi Arabia by 96 runs |
| T20I 3161 | 26 April | Malaysia | Saudi Arabia | Bayuemas Oval, Pandamaran | Malaysia by 5 wickets |
| T20I 3162 | 26 April | Singapore | Thailand | Bayuemas Oval, Pandamaran | Singapore by 10 runs |
| T20I 3166 | 28 April | Saudi Arabia | Thailand | Bayuemas Oval, Pandamaran | Saudi Arabia by 39 runs |
| T20I 3167 | 28 April | Malaysia | Singapore | Bayuemas Oval, Pandamaran | No result |
| T20I 3168 | 29 April | Malaysia | Thailand | Bayuemas Oval, Pandamaran | Malaysia by 70 runs |
| T20I 3169 | 29 April | Saudi Arabia | Singapore | Bayuemas Oval, Pandamaran | Saudi Arabia by 7 wickets |
| T20I 3170 | 30 April | Malaysia | Saudi Arabia | Bayuemas Oval, Pandamaran | Saudi Arabia by 7 wickets |
| T20I 3170a | 30 April | Singapore | Thailand | Bayuemas Oval, Pandamaran | Match abandoned |
Third-place play-off
| T20I 3171 | 2 May | Singapore | Thailand | Bayuemas Oval, Pandamaran | Singapore by 30 runs |
Final
| T20I 3172 | 2 May | Malaysia | Saudi Arabia | Bayuemas Oval, Pandamaran | Malaysia by 18 runs |

=== 2025 Kalahari Women's Tournament ===
| Pos | Team | Pld | W | L | NR | Pts | NRR |
|---|---|---|---|---|---|---|---|
| 1 | Sierra Leone | 6 | 6 | 0 | 0 | 12 | 3.033 |
| 2 | Botswana | 6 | 4 | 2 | 0 | 8 | 2.635 |
| 3 | Mozambique | 6 | 2 | 4 | 0 | 4 | −1.244 |
| 4 | Eswatini | 6 | 0 | 6 | 0 | 0 | −4.489 |

Source: ESPNcricinfo

Round-robin
| No. | Date | Team 1 | Team 2 | Venue | Result |
|---|---|---|---|---|---|
| WT20I 2249 | 26 April | Botswana | Eswatini | Botswana Cricket Association Oval 1, Gaborone | Botswana by 122 runs |
| WT20I 2250 | 26 April | Mozambique | Sierra Leone | Botswana Cricket Association Oval 2, Gaborone | Sierra Leone by 7 wickets |
| WT20I 2251 | 26 April | Eswatini | Sierra Leone | Botswana Cricket Association Oval 1, Gaborone | Sierra Leone by 10 wickets |
| WT20I 2252 | 26 April | Botswana | Mozambique | Botswana Cricket Association Oval 2, Gaborone | Botswana by 75 runs |
| WT20I 2253 | 27 April | Botswana | Sierra Leone | Botswana Cricket Association Oval 1, Gaborone | Sierra Leone by 6 runs |
| WT20I 2254 | 27 April | Eswatini | Mozambique | Botswana Cricket Association Oval 2, Gaborone | Mozambique by 16 runs |
| WT20I 2255 | 27 April | Botswana | Mozambique | Botswana Cricket Association Oval 1, Gaborone | Botswana by 58 runs |
| WT20I 2256 | 27 April | Eswatini | Sierra Leone | Botswana Cricket Association Oval 2, Gaborone | Sierra Leone by 150 runs |
| WT20I 2258 | 29 April | Mozambique | Sierra Leone | Botswana Cricket Association Oval 1, Gaborone | Sierra Leone by 6 wickets |
| WT20I 2259 | 29 April | Botswana | Eswatini | Botswana Cricket Association Oval 2, Gaborone | Botswana by 9 wickets |
| WT20I 2260 | 29 April | Botswana | Sierra Leone | Botswana Cricket Association Oval 1, Gaborone | Sierra Leone by 5 wickets |
| WT20I 2261 | 29 April | Eswatini | Mozambique | Botswana Cricket Association Oval 2, Gaborone | Mozambique by 58 runs |
Third-place play-off
| WT20I 2263 | 30 April | Eswatini | Mozambique | Botswana Cricket Association Oval 1, Gaborone | Mozambique by 52 runs |
Final
| WT20I 2264 | 30 April | Botswana | Sierra Leone | Botswana Cricket Association Oval 1, Gaborone | Sierra Leone by 39 runs |

== May ==
=== Bahrain women in Oman ===
WT20I series
| No. | Date | Venue | Result |
|---|---|---|---|
| WT20I 2265 | 2 May | Oman Cricket Academy Ground Turf 2, Al Amarat | Oman by 5 wickets |
| WT20I 2269 | 3 May | Oman Cricket Academy Ground Turf 1, Al Amarat | Oman by 57 runs |
| WT20I 2276 | 5 May | Oman Cricket Academy Ground Turf 1, Al Amarat | Oman by 5 wickets |

=== Cyprus women in Czech Republic ===
WT20I series
| No. | Date | Venue | Result |
|---|---|---|---|
| WT20I 2266 | 2 May | Vinoř Cricket Ground, Prague | Cyprus by 114 runs |
| WT20I 2267 | 2 May | Vinoř Cricket Ground, Prague | Cyprus by 67 runs |
| WT20I 2271 | 3 May | Vinoř Cricket Ground, Prague | Cyprus by 9 wickets |
| WT20I 2272 | 3 May | Vinoř Cricket Ground, Prague | Cyprus by 9 wickets |
| WT20I 2275 | 4 May | Vinoř Cricket Ground, Prague | Cyprus by 10 wickets |

=== 2025 Thailand Women's Quadrangular Series ===
| Pos | Team | Pld | W | L | NR | Pts | NRR |
|---|---|---|---|---|---|---|---|
| 1 | Thailand | 3 | 3 | 0 | 0 | 6 | 1.483 |
| 2 | United Arab Emirates | 3 | 2 | 1 | 0 | 4 | 1.183 |
| 3 | Hong Kong | 3 | 1 | 2 | 0 | 2 | −0.217 |
| 4 | Kuwait | 3 | 0 | 3 | 0 | 0 | −2.544 |

Source: ESPNcricinfo

Round-robin
| No. | Date | Team 1 | Team 2 | Venue | Result |
|---|---|---|---|---|---|
| WT20I 2268 | 3 May | Hong Kong | United Arab Emirates | Terdthai Cricket Ground, Bangkok | United Arab Emirates by 6 runs |
| WT20I 2270 | 3 May | Thailand | Kuwait | Terdthai Cricket Ground, Bangkok | Thailand by 6 wickets |
| WT20I 2273 | 4 May | Thailand | Hong Kong | Terdthai Cricket Ground, Bangkok | Thailand by 32 runs |
| WT20I 2274 | 4 May | Kuwait | United Arab Emirates | Terdthai Cricket Ground, Bangkok | United Arab Emirates by 81 runs |
| WT20I 2279 | 6 May | Hong Kong | Kuwait | Terdthai Cricket Ground, Bangkok | Hong Kong by 25 runs |
| WT20I 2280 | 6 May | Thailand | United Arab Emirates | Terdthai Cricket Ground, Bangkok | Thailand by 16 runs |

=== Croatia women in Malta ===
WT20I series
| No. | Date | Venue | Result |
|---|---|---|---|
| WT20I 2277 | 5 May | Marsa Sports Club, Marsa | Malta by 4 wickets |
| WT20I 2278 | 5 May | Marsa Sports Club, Marsa | Malta by 8 wickets |

=== Estonia in Malta ===
T20I series
| No. | Date | Venue | Result |
|---|---|---|---|
| T20I 3173 | 6 May | Marsa Sports Club, Marsa | Malta by 26 runs |
| T20I 3174 | 6 May | Marsa Sports Club, Marsa | Estonia by 4 wickets |
| T20I 3176 | 7 May | Marsa Sports Club, Marsa | Malta by 101 runs |

=== 2025 Men's Sano City International Tri-Series ===
| Pos | Team | Pld | W | L | NR | Pts | NRR |
|---|---|---|---|---|---|---|---|
| 1 | Japan | 4 | 2 | 0 | 2 | 6 | 2.375 |
| 2 | Thailand | 4 | 1 | 2 | 1 | 3 | −0.578 |
| 3 | Cook Islands | 4 | 1 | 2 | 1 | 3 | −1.128 |

Source: ESPNcricinfo

Round-robin
| No. | Date | Team 1 | Team 2 | Venue | Result |
|---|---|---|---|---|---|
| T20I 3175 | 7 May | Cook Islands | Thailand | Sano International Cricket Ground, Sano | Cook Islands by 3 wickets |
| T20I 3177 | 8 May | Japan | Thailand | Sano International Cricket Ground, Sano | Japan by 61 runs |
| T20I 3178 | 9 May | Cook Islands | Thailand | Sano International Cricket Ground, Sano | Thailand by 8 wickets |
| T20I 3179 | 9 May | Japan | Cook Islands | Sano International Cricket Ground, Sano | Japan by 34 runs |
| T20I 3179a | 10 May | Japan | Thailand | Sano International Cricket Ground, Sano | Match abandoned |
| T20I 3179b | 10 May | Japan | Cook Islands | Sano International Cricket Ground, Sano | Match abandoned |
Final
| T20I 3180 | 11 May | Japan | Thailand | Sano International Cricket Ground, Sano | Thailand by 6 wickets |

=== 2025 Women's T20 World Cup Asia Qualifier ===
| Pos | Team | Pld | W | L | T | NR | Pts | NRR | Qualification |
|---|---|---|---|---|---|---|---|---|---|
| 1 | Thailand | 4 | 2 | 0 | 0 | 2 | 6 | 4.642 | Advanced to the Super Three |
| 2 | Kuwait | 4 | 1 | 2 | 0 | 1 | 3 | −0.476 | |
| 3 | Bhutan | 4 | 1 | 2 | 0 | 1 | 3 | −1.774 | |

Source: ESPNcricinfo

| Pos | Team | Pld | W | L | T | NR | Pts | NRR | Qualification |
|---|---|---|---|---|---|---|---|---|---|
| 1 | United Arab Emirates | 4 | 2 | 0 | 0 | 2 | 6 | 6.998 | Advanced to the Super Three |
| 2 | Malaysia | 4 | 1 | 1 | 0 | 2 | 4 | 3.059 | |
| 3 | Qatar | 4 | 0 | 2 | 0 | 2 | 2 | −7.843 | |

Source: ESPNcricinfo

| Pos | Team | Pld | W | L | T | NR | Pts | NRR | Qualification |
|---|---|---|---|---|---|---|---|---|---|
| 1 | Nepal | 4 | 2 | 1 | 0 | 1 | 5 | 0.830 | Advanced to the Super Three |
| 2 | Hong Kong | 4 | 1 | 0 | 0 | 3 | 5 | 0.867 | |
| 3 | Bahrain | 4 | 0 | 2 | 0 | 2 | 2 | −1.800 | |

Source: ESPNcricinfo

Round-robin
| No. | Date | Team 1 | Team 2 | Venue | Result |
|---|---|---|---|---|---|
| WT20I 2281 | 9 May | Thailand | Kuwait | Terdthai Cricket Ground, Bangkok | Thailand by 8 wickets |
| WT20I 2282a | 9 May | Hong Kong | Nepal | Asian Institute of Technology Ground, Bangkok | Match abandoned |
| WT20I 2282 | 9 May | Malaysia | United Arab Emirates | Asian Institute of Technology Ground, Bangkok | United Arab Emirates by 9 wickets |
| WT20I 2283 | 10 May | Bahrain | Nepal | Terdthai Cricket Ground, Bangkok | Nepal by 9 wickets |
| WT20I 2283a | 10 May | Thailand | Bhutan | Asian Institute of Technology Ground, Bangkok | Match abandoned |
| WT20I 2284 | 10 May | Qatar | United Arab Emirates | Terdthai Cricket Ground, Bangkok | United Arab Emirates by 163 runs |
| WT20I 2289 | 12 May | Bhutan | Kuwait | Terdthai Cricket Ground, Bangkok | Kuwait by 35 runs |
| WT20I 2290 | 12 May | Bahrain | Hong Kong | Terdthai Cricket Ground, Bangkok | No result |
| WT20I 2290a | 12 May | Malaysia | Qatar | Asian Institute of Technology Ground, Bangkok | Match abandoned |
| WT20I 2290b | 13 May | Thailand | Kuwait | Terdthai Cricket Ground, Bangkok | Match abandoned |
| WT20I 2291 | 13 May | Hong Kong | Nepal | Asian Institute of Technology Ground, Bangkok | Hong Kong by 7 wickets |
| WT20I 2291a | 13 May | Malaysia | United Arab Emirates | Terdthai Cricket Ground, Bangkok | Match abandoned |
| WT20I 2292 | 15 May | Thailand | Bhutan | Terdthai Cricket Ground, Bangkok | Thailand by 45 runs |
| WT20I 2294 | 15 May | Bahrain | Nepal | Terdthai Cricket Ground, Bangkok | Nepal by 6 wickets (DLS) |
| WT20I 2294a | 15 May | Qatar | United Arab Emirates | Asian Institute of Technology Ground, Bangkok | Match abandoned |
| WT20I 2296 | 16 May | Bhutan | Kuwait | Terdthai Cricket Ground, Bangkok | Bhutan by 4 wickets |
| WT20I 2297a | 16 May | Bahrain | Hong Kong | Asian Institute of Technology Ground, Bangkok | Match abandoned |
| WT20I 2298 | 16 May | Malaysia | Qatar | Terdthai Cricket Ground, Bangkok | Malaysia by 10 wickets (DLS) |

| Pos | Team | Pld | W | L | T | NR | Pts | NRR | Qualification |
|---|---|---|---|---|---|---|---|---|---|
| 1 | Thailand | 6 | 4 | 0 | 0 | 2 | 10 | 3.808 | Qualified for the global qualifier |
| 2 | Nepal | 6 | 3 | 2 | 0 | 1 | 7 | −1.136 | Qualified for the global qualifier |
| 3 | United Arab Emirates | 6 | 2 | 2 | 0 | 2 | 6 | 1.869 | |

Source: ESPNcricinfo

Super Three
| No. | Date | Team 1 | Team 2 | Venue | Result |
|---|---|---|---|---|---|
| WT20I 2299 | 18 May | Thailand | United Arab Emirates | Terdthai Cricket Ground, Bangkok | Thailand by 54 runs |
| WT20I 2300 | 19 May | Nepal | United Arab Emirates | Terdthai Cricket Ground, Bangkok | Nepal by 5 wickets |
| WT20I 2301 | 20 May | Thailand | Nepal | Terdthai Cricket Ground, Bangkok | Thailand by 78 runs |

=== Germany women in Greece ===
WT20I series
| No. | Date | Venue | Result |
|---|---|---|---|
| WT20I 2285 | 10 May | Marina Ground, Gouvia | Germany by 105 runs |
| WT20I 2286 | 10 May | Marina Ground, Gouvia | Germany by 66 runs |
| WT20I 2287 | 11 May | Marina Ground, Gouvia | Germany by 89 runs |
| WT20I 2288 | 11 May | Marina Ground, Gouvia | Germany by 10 wickets |

=== Cook Islands in Japan ===
T20I series
| No. | Date | Venue | Result |
|---|---|---|---|
| T20I 3181 | 13 May | Sano International Cricket Ground, Sano | Japan by 2 wickets |
| T20I 3182 | 14 May | Sano International Cricket Ground, Sano | Japan by 42 runs |

=== Bulgaria women in Estonia ===
WT20I series
| No. | Date | Venue | Result |
|---|---|---|---|
| WT20I 2293 | 15 May | Estonian National Cricket and Rugby Field, Tallinn | Estonia by 8 wickets |
| WT20I 2295 | 15 May | Estonian National Cricket and Rugby Field, Tallinn | Estonia by 6 wickets |
| WT20I 2297 | 16 May | Estonian National Cricket and Rugby Field, Tallinn | Estonia by 6 runs |

=== Slovenia in Austria ===
T20I series
| No. | Date | Venue | Result |
|---|---|---|---|
| T20I 3183 | 17 May | Velden Cricket Ground, Latschach | Austria by 75 runs |
| T20I 3184 | 17 May | Velden Cricket Ground, Latschach | Austria by 110 runs |
| T20I 3186 | 18 May | Ballpark Ground, Graz | Austria by 5 wickets |
| T20I 3187 | 18 May | Ballpark Ground, Graz | Austria by 168 runs |

=== 2025 Women's T20 World Cup Europe Qualifier Division Two ===
| Pos | Team | Pld | W | L | NR | Pts | NRR | Qualification |
|---|---|---|---|---|---|---|---|---|
| 1 | Italy | 5 | 5 | 0 | 0 | 10 | 2.273 | Advanced to Division One |
| 2 | Germany | 5 | 4 | 1 | 0 | 8 | 0.540 | Advanced to Division One |
| 3 | Jersey | 5 | 2 | 3 | 0 | 4 | 0.781 | |
| 4 | Sweden | 5 | 2 | 3 | 0 | 4 | −1.318 | |
| 5 | Spain | 5 | 1 | 4 | 0 | 2 | −1.032 | |
| 6 | Isle of Man | 5 | 1 | 4 | 0 | 2 | −1.164 | |

Source: ESPNcricinfo

Round-robin
| No. | Date | Team 1 | Team 2 | Venue | Result |
|---|---|---|---|---|---|
| WT20I 2304 | 25 May | Italy | Jersey | Roma Cricket Ground, Rome | Italy by 7 wickets |
| WT20I 2305 | 25 May | Spain | Sweden | Simar Cricket Ground, Rome | Sweden by 13 runs |
| WT20I 2306 | 25 May | Italy | Isle of Man | Roma Cricket Ground, Rome | Italy by 8 wickets |
| WT20I 2307 | 25 May | Germany | Spain | Simar Cricket Ground, Rome | Germany by 28 runs |
| WT20I 2308 | 26 May | Germany | Jersey | Roma Cricket Ground, Rome | Germany by 7 runs |
| WT20I 2309 | 26 May | Isle of Man | Sweden | Simar Cricket Ground, Rome | Isle of Man by 7 wickets |
| WT20I 2310 | 26 May | Jersey | Spain | Roma Cricket Ground, Rome | Jersey by 7 wickets |
| WT20I 2311 | 26 May | Italy | Sweden | Simar Cricket Ground, Rome | Italy by 10 wickets |
| WT20I 2314 | 28 May | Italy | Germany | Roma Cricket Ground, Rome | Italy by 34 runs |
| WT20I 2315 | 28 May | Isle of Man | Spain | Simar Cricket Ground, Rome | Spain by 8 wickets |
| WT20I 2317 | 28 May | Germany | Sweden | Roma Cricket Ground, Rome | Germany by 39 runs |
| WT20I 2318 | 28 May | Isle of Man | Jersey | Simar Cricket Ground, Rome | Jersey by 49 runs |
| WT20I 2320 | 29 May | Italy | Spain | Roma Cricket Ground, Rome | Italy by 29 runs |
| WT20I 2321 | 29 May | Jersey | Sweden | Simar Cricket Ground, Rome | Sweden by 18 runs |
| WT20I 2323 | 29 May | Germany | Isle of Man | Roma Cricket Ground, Rome | Germany by 8 wickets |

=== Switzerland women in Belgium ===
WT20I series – Women's Mdina Cup
| No. | Date | Venue | Result |
|---|---|---|---|
| WT20I 2313 | 28 May | Stars Arena, Hofstade | Switzerland by 7 wickets |
| WT20I 2316 | 28 May | Stars Arena, Hofstade | Switzerland by 7 wickets |
| WT20I 2319 | 29 May | Stars Arena, Hofstade | Switzerland by 8 wickets |
| WT20I 2322 | 29 May | Stars Arena, Hofstade | Switzerland by 80 runs |

=== 2025 Men's Mdina Cup ===
| Pos | Team | Pld | W | L | NR | Pts | NRR |
|---|---|---|---|---|---|---|---|
| 1 | Portugal | 4 | 4 | 0 | 0 | 8 | 2.428 |
| 2 | Belgium | 4 | 2 | 2 | 0 | 4 | 1.116 |
| 3 | Malta | 4 | 0 | 4 | 0 | 0 | −3.318 |

Source: ESPNcricinfo

Round-robin
| No. | Date | Team 1 | Team 2 | Venue | Result |
|---|---|---|---|---|---|
| T20I 3191 | 30 May | Belgium | Malta | Stars Arena, Hofstade | Belgium by 6 wickets |
| T20I 3192 | 30 May | Malta | Portugal | Stars Arena, Hofstade | Portugal by 8 wickets |
| T20I 3195 | 30 May | Belgium | Portugal | Stars Arena, Hofstade | Portugal by 5 wickets |
| T20I 3196 | 31 May | Belgium | Malta | Stars Arena, Hofstade | Belgium by 103 runs |
| T20I 3198 | 31 May | Malta | Portugal | Stars Arena, Hofstade | Portugal by 8 wickets |
| T20I 3200 | 31 May | Belgium | Portugal | Stars Arena, Hofstade | Portugal by 5 wickets |
Final
| T20I 3202 | 1 June | Belgium | Portugal | Stars Arena, Hofstade | Belgium by 44 runs |

=== Switzerland in Austria ===
T20I series
| No. | Date | Venue | Result |
|---|---|---|---|
| T20I 3193 | 30 May | Velden Cricket Ground, Latschach | Austria by 29 runs |
| T20I 3197 | 31 May | Velden Cricket Ground, Latschach | Austria by 17 runs |
| T20I 3199 | 31 May | Velden Cricket Ground, Latschach | Switzerland by 3 wickets |
| T20I 3201 | 1 June | Velden Cricket Ground, Latschach | Austria by 17 runs |

== June ==
=== 2025 Women's Sano City International Trophy ===
| Pos | Team | Pld | W | L | NR | Pts | NRR |
|---|---|---|---|---|---|---|---|
| 1 | Hong Kong | 4 | 2 | 0 | 2 | 6 | 2.866 |
| 2 | Japan | 4 | 2 | 1 | 1 | 5 | 1.306 |
| 3 | China | 4 | 2 | 1 | 1 | 5 | 0.690 |
| 4 | Philippines | 4 | 1 | 2 | 1 | 3 | 0.649 |
| 5 | Mongolia | 4 | 0 | 3 | 1 | 1 | −4.292 |

Source: ESPNcricinfo

Round-robin
| No. | Date | Team 1 | Team 2 | Venue | Result |
|---|---|---|---|---|---|
| WT20I 2323a | 3 June | Japan | Mongolia | Sano International Cricket Ground, Sano | Match abandoned |
| WT20I 2323b | 3 June | China | Hong Kong | Sano International Cricket Ground, Sano | Match abandoned |
| WT20I 2327 | 4 June | Japan | Hong Kong | Sano International Cricket Ground, Sano | Hong Kong by 19 runs |
| WT20I 2328 | 4 June | China | Philippines | Sano International Cricket Ground, Sano | China by 5 wickets |
| WT20I 2332a | 5 June | Hong Kong | Philippines | Sano International Cricket Ground, Sano | Match abandoned |
| WT20I 2333 | 5 June | China | Mongolia | Sano International Cricket Ground, Sano | China by 7 wickets |
| WT20I 2337 | 6 June | Japan | China | Sano International Cricket Ground, Sano | Japan by 24 runs |
| WT20I 2338 | 6 June | Mongolia | Philippines | Sano International Cricket Ground, Sano | Philippines by 118 runs |
| WT20I 2342 | 7 June | Japan | Philippines | Sano International Cricket Ground, Sano | Japan by 59 runs |
| WT20I 2343 | 7 June | Hong Kong | Mongolia | Sano International Cricket Ground, Sano | Hong Kong by 7 wickets |
Third-place play-off
| WT20I 2347 | 8 June | China | Philippines | Sano International Cricket Ground, Sano | China by 7 wickets |
Final
| WT20I 2348 | 8 June | Japan | Hong Kong | Sano International Cricket Ground, Sano | Japan by 22 runs |
Fourth-place play-off
| WT20I 2349 | 8 June | Mongolia | Philippines | Sano International Cricket Ground 2, Sano | Philippines by 9 wickets |

=== 2025 Kwibuka Women's T20 Tournament ===
| Pos | Team | Pld | W | L | NR | Pts | NRR |
|---|---|---|---|---|---|---|---|
| 1 | Rwanda | 8 | 7 | 1 | 0 | 14 | 1.387 |
| 2 | Uganda | 8 | 6 | 2 | 0 | 12 | 1.696 |
| 3 | Zimbabwe XI | 8 | 6 | 2 | 0 | 12 | 1.414 |
| 4 | Tanzania | 8 | 5 | 3 | 0 | 10 | 2.403 |
| 5 | Nigeria | 8 | 5 | 3 | 0 | 10 | 0.518 |
| 6 | Brazil | 8 | 4 | 4 | 0 | 8 | 0.012 |
| 7 | Malawi | 8 | 1 | 7 | 0 | 2 | −1.341 |
| 8 | Sierra Leone | 8 | 1 | 7 | 0 | 2 | −2.260 |
| 9 | Cameroon | 8 | 1 | 7 | 0 | 2 | −3.933 |

Source: ESPNcricinfo

Round-robin
| No. | Date | Team 1 | Team 2 | Venue | Result |
|---|---|---|---|---|---|
| WT20I 2324 | 3 June | Rwanda | Cameroon | Gahanga International Cricket Stadium, Kigali | Rwanda by 91 runs |
| 2nd Match | 3 June | Nigeria | Zimbabwe XI | Gahanga B Ground, Kigali | Zimbabwe XI by 6 runs |
| WT20I 2325 | 3 June | Sierra Leone | Tanzania | Gahanga International Cricket Stadium, Kigali | Tanzania by 105 runs |
| WT20I 2326 | 3 June | Brazil | Malawi | Gahanga B Ground, Kigali | Brazil by 7 wickets |
| WT20I 2329 | 4 June | Rwanda | Sierra Leone | Gahanga International Cricket Stadium, Kigali | Rwanda by 55 runs |
| WT20I 2330 | 4 June | Cameroon | Uganda | Gahanga B Ground, Kigali | Uganda by 10 wickets |
| WT20I 2331 | 4 June | Brazil | Nigeria | Gahanga International Cricket Stadium, Kigali | Brazil by 5 runs (DLS) |
| WT20I 2332 | 4 June | Malawi | Tanzania | Gahanga B Ground, Kigali | Tanzania by 8 runs (DLS) |
| 9th Match | 5 June | Uganda | Zimbabwe XI | Gahanga International Cricket Stadium, Kigali | Uganda by 4 runs |
| WT20I 2334 | 5 June | Cameroon | Sierra Leone | Gahanga B Ground, Kigali | Cameroon by 23 runs |
| WT20I 2335 | 5 June | Rwanda | Malawi | Gahanga International Cricket Stadium, Kigali | Rwanda by 49 runs |
| WT20I 2336 | 5 June | Nigeria | Tanzania | Gahanga B Ground, Kigali | Nigeria by 2 wickets |
| 13th Match | 6 June | Brazil | Zimbabwe XI | Gahanga International Cricket Stadium, Kigali | Zimbabwe XI by 62 runs |
| WT20I 2339 | 6 June | Sierra Leone | Uganda | Gahanga B Ground, Kigali | Uganda by 10 wickets |
| WT20I 2340 | 6 June | Cameroon | Malawi | Gahanga International Cricket Stadium, Kigali | Malawi by 6 wickets |
| WT20I 2341 | 6 June | Rwanda | Nigeria | Gahanga B Ground, Kigali | Rwanda by 40 runs |
| WT20I 2344 | 7 June | Brazil | Uganda | Gahanga International Cricket Stadium, Kigali | Uganda by 7 wickets |
| WT20I 2345 | 7 June | Malawi | Sierra Leone | Gahanga B Ground, Kigali | Sierra Leone by 4 wickets |
| 19th Match | 7 June | Tanzania | Zimbabwe XI | Gahanga International Cricket Stadium, Kigali | Zimbabwe XI by 9 wickets (DLS) |
| WT20I 2346 | 7 June | Cameroon | Nigeria | Gahanga B Ground, Kigali | Nigeria by 38 runs (DLS) |
| WT20I 2350 | 8 June | Malawi | Uganda | Gahanga International Cricket Stadium, Kigali | Uganda by 50 runs |
| WT20I 2351 | 8 June | Brazil | Tanzania | Gahanga B Ground, Kigali | Tanzania by 9 wickets |
| WT20I 2352 | 8 June | Nigeria | Sierra Leone | Gahanga International Cricket Stadium, Kigali | Nigeria by 36 runs |
| 24th Match | 8 June | Rwanda | Zimbabwe XI | Gahanga B Ground, Kigali | Rwanda by 6 wickets |
| WT20I 2354 | 10 June | Tanzania | Uganda | Gahanga International Cricket Stadium, Kigali | Uganda by 20 runs |
| WT20I 2355 | 10 June | Malawi | Nigeria | Gahanga B Ground, Kigali | Nigeria by 46 runs |
| 27th Match | 10 June | Cameroon | Zimbabwe XI | Gahanga International Cricket Stadium, Kigali | Zimbabwe XI by 88 runs |
| WT20I 2356 | 10 June | Rwanda | Brazil | Gahanga B Ground, Kigali | Rwanda by 8 runs |
| WT20I 2357 | 11 June | Nigeria | Uganda | Gahanga International Cricket Stadium, Kigali | Nigeria by 4 runs |
| WT20I 2358 | 11 June | Rwanda | Tanzania | Gahanga B Ground, Kigali | Tanzania by 7 wickets |
| WT20I 2361 | 11 June | Brazil | Cameroon | Gahanga International Cricket Stadium, Kigali | Brazil by 112 runs |
| 32nd Match | 11 June | Sierra Leone | Zimbabwe XI | Gahanga B Ground, Kigali | Zimbabwe XI by 9 wickets |
| WT20I 2363 | 12 June | Cameroon | Tanzania | Gahanga International Cricket Stadium, Kigali | Tanzania by 119 runs |
| WT20I 2364 | 12 June | Rwanda | Uganda | Gahanga B Ground, Kigali | Rwanda by 5 wickets |
| 35th Match | 12 June | Malawi | Zimbabwe XI | Gahanga International Cricket Stadium, Kigali | Zimbabwe XI by 30 runs |
| WT20I 2367 | 12 June | Brazil | Sierra Leone | Gahanga B Ground, Kigali | Brazil by 8 wickets |
Semi-finals
| WT20I 2369 | 13 June | Rwanda | Tanzania | Gahanga International Cricket Stadium, Kigali | Tanzania by 16 runs |
| 2nd Semi-final | 13 June | Uganda | Zimbabwe XI | Gahanga B Ground, Kigali | Zimbabwe XI by 1 run |
Third-place play-off
| WT20I 2373 | 14 June | Rwanda | Uganda | Gahanga B Ground, Kigali | Uganda by 20 runs |
Final
| Final | 14 June | Tanzania | Zimbabwe XI | Gahanga International Cricket Stadium, Kigali | Tanzania by 32 runs |

=== Guernsey in Jersey ===
Inter-Insular – T20I series
| No. | Date | Venue | Result |
|---|---|---|---|
| T20I 3204 | 6 June | Grainville Cricket Ground, Saint Saviour | Guernsey by 13 runs (DLS) |
| T20I 3207 | 7 June | Grainville Cricket Ground, Saint Saviour | Jersey by 7 wickets (DLS) |
| T20I 3209 | 7 June | Grainville Cricket Ground, Saint Saviour | Jersey by 3 runs |

=== Slovenia in Serbia ===
T20I series (Adria Cup)
| No. | Date | Venue | Result |
|---|---|---|---|
| T20I 3206 | 7 June | Lisicji Jarak Cricket Ground, Belgrade | Serbia by 3 runs |
| T20I 3208 | 7 June | Lisicji Jarak Cricket Ground, Belgrade | Serbia by 9 wickets |
| T20I 3211 | 8 June | Lisicji Jarak Cricket Ground, Belgrade | Serbia by 24 runs |

=== United States women in the Netherlands ===
WT20I series
| No. | Date | Venue | Result |
|---|---|---|---|
| WT20I 2345a | 7 June | VRA Cricket Ground, Amstelveen | Match abandoned |
| WT20I 2353 | 9–10 June | Sportpark Maarschalkerweerd, Utrecht | Netherlands by 16 runs |
| WT20I 2360 | 11 June | Sportpark Maarschalkerweerd, Utrecht | Netherlands by 53 runs |
| WT20I 2366 | 12 June | Sportpark Maarschalkerweerd, Utrecht | Netherlands by 52 runs |
| WT20I 2371 | 13 June | Sportpark Maarschalkerweerd, Utrecht | Netherlands by 75 runs |

=== 2025 Men's Central Europe Cup ===
| Pos | Team | Pld | W | L | NR | Pts | NRR |
|---|---|---|---|---|---|---|---|
| 1 | Austria | 4 | 3 | 1 | 0 | 6 | 3.614 |
| 2 | Norway | 4 | 3 | 1 | 0 | 6 | 0.622 |
| 3 | Czech Republic | 4 | 0 | 4 | 0 | 0 | −4.483 |

Source: ESPNcricinfo

Round-robin
| No. | Date | Team 1 | Team 2 | Venue | Result |
|---|---|---|---|---|---|
| T20I 3210 | 8 June | Czech Republic | Austria | Vinoř Cricket Ground, Prague | Austria by 10 wickets |
| T20I 3212 | 8 June | Czech Republic | Norway | Vinoř Cricket Ground, Prague | Norway by 37 runs |
| T20I 3214 | 9 June | Austria | Norway | Vinoř Cricket Ground, Prague | Norway by 22 runs |
| T20I 3215 | 9 June | Czech Republic | Austria | Vinoř Cricket Ground, Prague | Austria by 161 runs |
| T20I 3216 | 10 June | Czech Republic | Norway | Vinoř Cricket Ground, Prague | Norway by 41 runs |
| T20I 3217 | 10 June | Austria | Norway | Vinoř Cricket Ground, Prague | Austria by 9 wickets |

=== Cambodia in Indonesia ===
T20I series
| No. | Date | Venue | Result |
|---|---|---|---|
| T20I 3219 | 11 June | Udayana Cricket Ground, Jimbaran | Cambodia by 8 wickets |
| T20I 3221 | 12 June | Udayana Cricket Ground, Jimbaran | Cambodia by 5 wickets |
| T20I 3222 | 12 June | Udayana Cricket Ground, Jimbaran | Cambodia by 6 wickets |
| T20I 3228 | 14 June | Udayana Cricket Ground, Jimbaran | Indonesia by 9 wickets |
| T20I 3229 | 14 June | Udayana Cricket Ground, Jimbaran | No result |
| T20I 3234 | 15 June | Udayana Cricket Ground, Jimbaran | Cambodia by 9 wickets |
| T20I 3235 | 15 June | Udayana Cricket Ground, Jimbaran | Cambodia by 10 wickets |
| T20I 3242 | 16 June | Udayana Cricket Ground, Jimbaran | Indonesia by 4 wickets |

=== 2025 Women's Central Europe Cup ===
| Pos | Team | Pld | W | L | NR | Pts | NRR |
|---|---|---|---|---|---|---|---|
| 1 | Austria | 4 | 4 | 0 | 0 | 8 | 3.541 |
| 2 | Gibraltar | 4 | 2 | 2 | 0 | 4 | 0.700 |
| 3 | Czech Republic | 4 | 0 | 4 | 0 | 0 | −4.588 |

Round-robin
| No. | Date | Team 1 | Team 2 | Venue | Result |
|---|---|---|---|---|---|
| WT20I 2359 | 11 June | Czech Republic | Gibraltar | Vinoř Cricket Ground, Prague | Gibraltar by 51 runs |
| WT20I 2362 | 11 June | Austria | Gibraltar | Vinoř Cricket Ground, Prague | Austria by 55 runs |
| WT20I 2365 | 12 June | Austria | Gibraltar | Vinoř Cricket Ground, Prague | Austria by 17 runs |
| WT20I 2368 | 12 June | Czech Republic | Austria | Vinoř Cricket Ground, Prague | Austria by 10 wickets |
| WT20I 2370 | 13 June | Czech Republic | Gibraltar | Vinoř Cricket Ground, Prague | Gibraltar by 77 runs |
| WT20I 2372 | 13 June | Czech Republic | Austria | Vinoř Cricket Ground, Prague | Austria by 8 wickets |

=== 2025 No Frills T20I series ===
T20I series
| No. | Date | Team 1 | Team 2 | Venue | Result |
|---|---|---|---|---|---|
| T20I 3220 | 11 June | Bahamas | Cayman Islands | Maple Leaf North-East Ground, King City | Cayman Islands by 5 wickets |
| T20I 3223 | 12 June | Canada | Bahamas | Maple Leaf North-East Ground, King City | Canada by 107 runs |
| T20I 3224 | 12 June | Bermuda | Cayman Islands | Maple Leaf North-East Ground, King City | Bermuda by 30 runs |
| T20I 3226 | 13 June | Bahamas | Bermuda | Maple Leaf North-East Ground, King City | Bermuda by 18 runs |
| T20I 3227 | 13 June | Canada | Cayman Islands | Maple Leaf North-East Ground, King City | Canada by 126 runs |

=== 2025 Men's Nordic Cup ===
| Pos | Team | Pld | W | L | NR | Pts | NRR |
|---|---|---|---|---|---|---|---|
| 1 | Denmark | 3 | 2 | 1 | 0 | 4 | 2.006 |
| 2 | Norway | 3 | 2 | 1 | 0 | 4 | 0.189 |
| 3 | Sweden | 3 | 1 | 2 | 0 | 2 | 0.833 |
| 4 | Finland | 3 | 1 | 2 | 0 | 2 | −3.017 |

Source: ESPNcricinfo

Round-robin
| No. | Date | Team 1 | Team 2 | Venue | Result |
|---|---|---|---|---|---|
| T20I 3225 | 13 June | Denmark | Finland | Ishoj Cricket Club, Ishøj | Denmark by 121 runs |
| T20I 3230 | 14 June | Finland | Norway | Ishoj Cricket Club, Ishøj | Finland by 11 runs |
| T20I 3231 | 14 June | Denmark | Sweden | Koge Cricket Club, Køge | Denmark by 18 runs |
| T20I 3232 | 14 June | Denmark | Norway | Koge Cricket Club, Køge | Norway by 9 wickets |
| T20I 3233 | 14 June | Finland | Sweden | Ishoj Cricket Club, Ishøj | Sweden by 71 runs |
| T20I 3236 | 15 June | Norway | Sweden | Ishoj Cricket Club, Ishøj | Norway by 2 wickets |

=== 2025 Women's PacificAus Sports Invitational ===
| Pos | Team | Pld | W | L | NR | Pts | NRR |
|---|---|---|---|---|---|---|---|
| 1 | Papua New Guinea | 6 | 5 | 1 | 0 | 10 | 1.646 |
| 2 | Australian Indigenous | 6 | 5 | 1 | 0 | 10 | 1.422 |
| 3 | Vanuatu | 6 | 1 | 4 | 1 | 3 | −1.140 |
| 4 | Samoa | 6 | 0 | 5 | 1 | 1 | −2.502 |

Source: Cricclubs

Round-robin
| No. | Date | Team 1 | Team 2 | Venue | Result |
|---|---|---|---|---|---|
| 1st Match | 15 June | Papua New Guinea | (Australia) Australian Indigenous | Amini Park, Port Moresby | Australian Indigenous by 8 wickets |
| WT20I 2374 | 15 June | Samoa | Vanuatu | Amini Park, Port Moresby | No result |
| 3rd Match | 16 June | (Australia) Australian Indigenous | Samoa | Amini Park, Port Moresby | Australian Indigenous by 46 runs |
| WT20I 2375 | 16 June | Papua New Guinea | Vanuatu | Amini Park, Port Moresby | Papua New Guinea by 35 runs |
| WT20I 2376 | 17 June | Papua New Guinea | Samoa | Amini Park, Port Moresby | Papua New Guinea by 4 wickets |
| 6th Match | 17 June | (Australia) Australian Indigenous | Vanuatu | Amini Park, Port Moresby | Australian Indigenous by 6 wickets |
| 7th Match | 19 June | Papua New Guinea | (Australia) Australian Indigenous | Amini Park, Port Moresby | Papua New Guinea by 2 wickets |
| WT20I 2377 | 19 June | Samoa | Vanuatu | Amini Park, Port Moresby | Vanuatu by 9 runs |
| WT20I 2378 | 20 June | Papua New Guinea | Vanuatu | Amini Park, Port Moresby | Papua New Guinea by 31 runs |
| 10th Match | 20 June | (Australia) Australian Indigenous | Samoa | Amini Park, Port Moresby | Australian Indigenous by 7 wickets |
| 11th Match | 21 June | (Australia) Australian Indigenous | Vanuatu | Amini Park, Port Moresby | Australian Indigenous by 8 wickets |
| WT20I 2380 | 21 June | Papua New Guinea | Samoa | Amini Park, Port Moresby | Papua New Guinea by 94 runs |

=== Finland against Norway in Denmark ===
T20I match
| No. | Date | Venue | Result |
|---|---|---|---|
| T20I 3237 | 15 June | Ishoj Cricket Club, Ishøj | Finland by 22 runs |

=== 2025 Scotland T20I Tri-Nation Series ===
| Pos | Team | Pld | W | L | NR | Pts | NRR |
|---|---|---|---|---|---|---|---|
| 1 | Scotland | 4 | 2 | 2 | 0 | 4 | 0.672 |
| 2 | Nepal | 4 | 2 | 2 | 0 | 4 | −0.291 |
| 3 | Netherlands | 4 | 2 | 2 | 0 | 4 | −0.385 |

Source: Cricinfo

Round-robin
| No. | Date | Team 1 | Team 2 | Venue | Result |
|---|---|---|---|---|---|
| T20I 3239 | 15 June | Scotland | Netherlands | Titwood, Glasgow | Scotland by 39 runs |
| T20I 3243 | 16 June | Netherlands | Nepal | Titwood, Glasgow | Match tied (Netherlands won third S/O) |
| T20I 3246 | 17 June | Scotland | Nepal | Titwood, Glasgow | Nepal by 2 wickets |
| T20I 3247 | 18 June | Scotland | Netherlands | Titwood, Glasgow | Netherlands by 17 runs |
| T20I 3250 | 19 June | Netherlands | Nepal | Titwood, Glasgow | Nepal by 6 wickets |
| T20I 3253 | 20 June | Scotland | Nepal | Titwood, Glasgow | Scotland by 34 runs |

=== 2025 Men's T20 World Cup Americas Regional Final ===
Final standings
| Pos | Team | Pld | W | L | NR | Pts | NRR | Qualification |
|---|---|---|---|---|---|---|---|---|
| 1 | Canada (H) | 6 | 6 | 0 | 0 | 12 | 4.843 | Qualified for the 2026 Men's T20 World Cup |
| 2 | Bermuda | 6 | 3 | 3 | 0 | 6 | 0.186 | Eliminated |
| 3 | Cayman Islands | 6 | 3 | 3 | 0 | 6 | −0.705 | Eliminated |
| 4 | Bahamas | 6 | 0 | 6 | 0 | 0 | −4.234 | Eliminated |

Source: ESPNcricinfo
(H) Host

Round-robin
| No. | Date | Team 1 | Team 2 | Venue | Result |
|---|---|---|---|---|---|
| T20I 3240 | 15 June | Canada | Bermuda | Maple Leaf North-West Ground, King City | Canada by 110 runs |
| T20I 3241 | 15 June | Bahamas | Cayman Islands | Maple Leaf North-West Ground, King City | Cayman Islands by 38 runs |
| T20I 3244 | 16 June | Canada | Cayman Islands | Maple Leaf North-West Ground, King City | Canada by 50 runs |
| T20I 3245 | 16 June | Bahamas | Bermuda | Maple Leaf North-West Ground, King City | Bermuda by 7 wickets |
| T20I 3248 | 18 June | Bermuda | Cayman Islands | Maple Leaf North-West Ground, King City | Bermuda by 7 wickets |
| T20I 3249 | 18 June | Canada | Bahamas | Maple Leaf North-West Ground, King City | Canada by 10 wickets (DLS) |
| T20I 3251 | 19 June | Bahamas | Bermuda | Maple Leaf North-West Ground, King City | Bermuda by 26 runs |
| T20I 3252 | 19 June | Canada | Cayman Islands | Maple Leaf North-West Ground, King City | Canada by 43 runs |
| T20I 3258 | 21 June | Canada | Bahamas | Maple Leaf North-West Ground, King City | Canada by 7 wickets |
| T20I 3259 | 21 June | Bermuda | Cayman Islands | Maple Leaf North-West Ground, King City | Cayman Islands by 9 wickets |
| T20I 3262 | 22 June | Bahamas | Cayman Islands | Maple Leaf North-West Ground, King City | Cayman Islands by 49 runs |
| T20I 3263 | 22 June | Canada | Bermuda | Maple Leaf North-West Ground, King City | Canada by 6 wickets |

=== Slovenia in Hungary ===
T20I series
| No. | Date | Venue | Result |
|---|---|---|---|
| T20I 3254 | 21 June | GB Oval, Sződliget | Hungary by 122 runs |
| T20I 3256 | 21 June | GB Oval, Sződliget | Hungary by 62 runs |
| T20I 3260 | 22 June | GB Oval, Sződliget | Hungary by 9 wickets |

=== Switzerland in Luxembourg ===
T20I series
| No. | Date | Venue | Result |
|---|---|---|---|
| T20I 3255 | 21 June | Pierre Werner Cricket Ground, Walferdange | Switzerland by 57 runs |
| T20I 3257 | 21 June | Pierre Werner Cricket Ground, Walferdange | Switzerland by 11 runs |
| T20I 3261 | 22 June | Pierre Werner Cricket Ground, Walferdange | Luxembourg by 7 wickets |

=== 2025 Men's Continental Cup ===
| Pos | Team | Pld | W | L | NR | Pts | NRR |
|---|---|---|---|---|---|---|---|
| 1 | Romania | 2 | 2 | 0 | 0 | 4 | 5.475 |
| 2 | Austria | 2 | 1 | 1 | 0 | 2 | −0.502 |
| 3 | Hungary | 2 | 0 | 2 | 0 | 0 | −6.375 |

Source: ESPNcricinfo

| Pos | Team | Pld | W | L | NR | Pts | NRR |
|---|---|---|---|---|---|---|---|
| 1 | Belgium | 2 | 2 | 0 | 0 | 4 | 2.025 |
| 2 | Malta | 2 | 1 | 1 | 0 | 2 | −0.471 |
| 3 | France | 2 | 0 | 2 | 0 | 0 | −1.761 |

Source: ESPNcricinfo

Round-robin
| No. | Date | Team 1 | Team 2 | Venue | Result |
|---|---|---|---|---|---|
| T20I 3264 | 26 June | France | Malta | Moara Vlasiei Cricket Ground, Ilfov County | Malta by 6 wickets |
| T20I 3265 | 26 June | Romania | Austria | Moara Vlasiei Cricket Ground, Ilfov County | Romania by 6 wickets |
| T20I 3266 | 26 June | Belgium | Malta | Moara Vlasiei Cricket Ground, Ilfov County | Belgium by 65 runs |
| T20I 3267 | 27 June | Austria | Hungary | Moara Vlasiei Cricket Ground, Ilfov County | Austria by 8 wickets |
| T20I 3268 | 27 June | Belgium | France | Moara Vlasiei Cricket Ground, Ilfov County | Belgium by 16 runs |
| T20I 3269 | 27 June | Romania | Hungary | Moara Vlasiei Cricket Ground, Ilfov County | Romania by 7 wickets |
Semi-Finals
| T20I 3270 | 28 June | Austria | Belgium | Moara Vlasiei Cricket Ground, Ilfov County | Austria by 4 wickets |
| T20I 3271 | 28 June | Romania | Malta | Moara Vlasiei Cricket Ground, Ilfov County | Malta by 13 runs (DLS) |
3rd Place Play-off
| T20I 3272 | 29 June | Romania | Belgium | Moara Vlasiei Cricket Ground, Ilfov County | Belgium by 63 runs |
Final
| T20I 3273 | 29 June | Austria | Malta | Moara Vlasiei Cricket Ground, Ilfov County | Malta by 47 runs |
5th Place Play-off
| T20I 3274 | 29 June | France | Hungary | Moara Vlasiei Cricket Ground, Ilfov County | Hungary by 52 runs |

== July ==
=== Indonesia women in Singapore ===
WT20I series (Indo Singa Friendship Cup)
| No. | Date | Venue | Result |
|---|---|---|---|
| WT20I 2385 | 2 July | Singapore National Cricket Ground, Singapore | No result |
| WT20I 2386 | 3 July | Singapore National Cricket Ground, Singapore | Indonesia by 9 wickets |
| WT20I 2388 | 5 July | Singapore National Cricket Ground, Singapore | Indonesia by 18 runs (DLS) |

=== 2025 Men's T20 World Cup Europe Regional Final ===
Final standings
| Pos | Team | Pld | W | L | NR | Pts | NRR | Qualification |
|---|---|---|---|---|---|---|---|---|
| 1 | Netherlands (H) | 4 | 3 | 1 | 0 | 6 | 1.281 | Qualified for the 2026 Men's T20 World Cup |
| 2 | Italy | 4 | 2 | 1 | 1 | 5 | 0.612 | Qualified for the 2026 Men's T20 World Cup |
| 3 | Jersey | 4 | 2 | 1 | 1 | 5 | 0.306 | Eliminated |
| 4 | Scotland (Note: Although Scotland were eliminated in the qualifier; they qualified for the tournament based on ICC Rankings to replace Bangladesh after the latter's withdrawal.) | 4 | 1 | 2 | 1 | 3 | −0.117 | Qualified for the 2026 Men's T20 World Cup |
| 5 | Guernsey | 4 | 0 | 3 | 1 | 1 | −2.517 | Eliminated |

Source: Cricinfo
(H) Host

Round-robin
| No. | Date | Team 1 | Team 2 | Venue | Result |
|---|---|---|---|---|---|
| T20I 3275 | 5 July | Netherlands | Jersey | Sportpark Westvliet, Voorburg | Netherlands by 7 wickets |
| T20I 3277 | 5 July | Guernsey | Italy | Sportpark Westvliet, Voorburg | Italy by 7 wickets |
| T20I 3279a | 6 July | Guernsey | Scotland | Sportpark Westvliet, Voorburg | Match abandoned |
| T20I 3280a | 6 July | Italy | Jersey | Sportpark Westvliet, Voorburg | Match abandoned |
| T20I 3286 | 8 July | Guernsey | Jersey | Sportpark Westvliet, Voorburg | Jersey by 22 runs |
| T20I 3288 | 8 July | Netherlands | Scotland | Sportpark Westvliet, Voorburg | Scotland by 6 runs |
| T20I 3291 | 9 July | Italy | Scotland | Sportpark Westvliet, Voorburg | Italy by 12 runs |
| T20I 3292 | 9 July | Netherlands | Guernsey | Sportpark Westvliet, Voorburg | Netherlands by 73 runs |
| T20I 3301 | 11 July | Jersey | Scotland | Sportpark Westvliet, Voorburg | Jersey by 1 wicket |
| T20I 3303 | 11 July | Netherlands | Italy | Sportpark Westvliet, Voorburg | Netherlands by 9 wickets |

=== 2025 Malawi Quad Nations T20 Cup ===
| Pos | Team | Pld | W | L | NR | Pts | NRR |
|---|---|---|---|---|---|---|---|
| 1 | Bahrain | 6 | 4 | 1 | 1 | 9 | 2.607 |
| 2 | Tanzania | 6 | 3 | 2 | 1 | 7 | 0.667 |
| 3 | Germany | 6 | 2 | 3 | 1 | 5 | −0.413 |
| 4 | Malawi | 6 | 1 | 4 | 1 | 3 | −2.615 |

Source: ESPNcricinfo

Round-robin
| No. | Date | Team 1 | Team 2 | Venue | Result |
|---|---|---|---|---|---|
| T20I 3276 | 5 July | Malawi | Germany | TCA Oval, Blantyre | Germany by 5 wickets |
| T20I 3279 | 6 July | Malawi | Tanzania | TCA Oval, Blantyre | Tanzania by 72 runs |
| T20I 3280 | 6 July | Bahrain | Germany | TCA Oval, Blantyre | Bahrain by 48 runs |
| T20I 3283 | 7 July | Germany | Tanzania | TCA Oval, Blantyre | Germany by 4 wickets |
| T20I 3284 | 7 July | Malawi | Bahrain | TCA Oval, Blantyre | Bahrain by 7 wickets |
| T20I 3287 | 8 July | Bahrain | Tanzania | TCA Oval, Blantyre | Tanzania by 6 wickets |
| T20I 3290a | 9 July | Malawi | Tanzania | TCA Oval, Blantyre | Match abandoned |
| T20I 3291a | 9 July | Bahrain | Germany | TCA Oval, Blantyre | Match abandoned |
| T20I 3296 | 10 July | Bahrain | Tanzania | TCA Oval, Blantyre | Bahrain by 6 wickets |
| T20I 3298 | 10 July | Malawi | Germany | TCA Oval, Blantyre | Malawi by 8 runs |
| T20I 3307 | 12 July | Malawi | Bahrain | TCA Oval, Blantyre | Bahrain by 10 wickets |
| T20I 3309 | 12 July | Germany | Tanzania | TCA Oval, Blantyre | Tanzania by 5 wickets |
Third-place play-off
| T20I 3313 | 13 July | Malawi | Germany | TCA Oval, Blantyre | Germany by 37 runs |
Final
| T20I 3314 | 13 July | Bahrain | Tanzania | TCA Oval, Blantyre | Tanzania by 10 wickets |

=== Jersey women in Guernsey ===
Inter-Insular – WT20I series
| No. | Date | Venue | Result |
|---|---|---|---|
| WT20I 2389 | 5 July | King George V Sports Ground, Castel | Jersey by 90 runs (DLS) |

=== 2025 Rising Asia Tri-Series ===
| Pos | Team | Pld | W | L | NR | Pts | NRR |
|---|---|---|---|---|---|---|---|
| 1 | Philippines | 8 | 6 | 2 | 0 | 12 | 2.201 |
| 2 | Indonesia | 8 | 4 | 4 | 0 | 8 | 0.832 |
| 3 | South Korea | 8 | 2 | 6 | 0 | 4 | −3.047 |

Source: ESPNcricinfo

Round-robin
| No. | Date | Team 1 | Team 2 | Venue | Result |
|---|---|---|---|---|---|
| T20I 3278 | 6 July | Indonesia | Philippines | Udayana Cricket Ground, Jimbaran | Philippines by 53 runs |
| T20I 3281 | 7 July | Philippines | South Korea | Udayana Cricket Ground, Jimbaran | Philippines by 7 wickets |
| T20I 3282 | 7 July | Indonesia | Philippines | Udayana Cricket Ground, Jimbaran | Indonesia by 45 runs |
| T20I 3285 | 8 July | Indonesia | South Korea | Udayana Cricket Ground, Jimbaran | Indonesia by 52 runs |
| T20I 3289 | 9 July | Philippines | South Korea | Udayana Cricket Ground, Jimbaran | South Korea by 39 runs |
| T20I 3290 | 9 July | Indonesia | South Korea | Udayana Cricket Ground, Jimbaran | Indonesia by 10 wickets |
| T20I 3293 | 10 July | Indonesia | Philippines | Udayana Cricket Ground, Jimbaran | Philippines by 9 wickets |
| T20I 3294 | 10 July | Philippines | South Korea | Udayana Cricket Ground, Jimbaran | Philippines by 112 runs |
| T20I 3304 | 12 July | Indonesia | South Korea | Udayana Cricket Ground, Jimbaran | South Korea by 3 wickets |
| T20I 3305 | 12 July | Philippines | South Korea | Udayana Cricket Ground, Jimbaran | Philippines by 85 runs |
| T20I 3310 | 13 July | Indonesia | Philippines | Udayana Cricket Ground, Jimbaran | Philippines by 6 wickets |
| T20I 3311 | 13 July | Indonesia | South Korea | Udayana Cricket Ground, Jimbaran | Indonesia by 7 wickets |

=== 2025 Bulgaria Women's Quadrangular Series ===
| Pos | Team | Pld | W | L | NR | Pts | NRR |
|---|---|---|---|---|---|---|---|
| 1 | Turkey | 3 | 3 | 0 | 0 | 6 | 3.850 |
| 2 | Greece | 3 | 2 | 1 | 0 | 4 | 0.775 |
| 3 | Serbia | 3 | 1 | 2 | 0 | 2 | −0.631 |
| 4 | Bulgaria | 3 | 0 | 3 | 0 | 0 | −4.207 |

Source: ESPNcricinfo

Round-robin
| No. | Date | Team 1 | Team 2 | Venue | Result |
|---|---|---|---|---|---|
| WT20I 2390 | 7 July | Greece | Turkey | Vasil Levski National Sports Academy, Sofia | Turkey by 2 runs |
| WT20I 2391 | 7 July | Bulgaria | Serbia | Vasil Levski National Sports Academy, Sofia | Serbia by 8 wickets |
| WT20I 2392 | 7 July | Serbia | Turkey | Vasil Levski National Sports Academy, Sofia | Turkey by 63 runs |
| WT20I 2393 | 8 July | Bulgaria | Greece | Vasil Levski National Sports Academy, Sofia | Greece by 44 runs |
| WT20I 2394 | 8 July | Greece | Serbia | Vasil Levski National Sports Academy, Sofia | Greece by 1 wicket |
| WT20I 2395 | 8 July | Bulgaria | Turkey | Vasil Levski National Sports Academy, Sofia | Turkey by 166 runs |
Third-place play-off
| WT20I 2396 | 9 July | Bulgaria | Serbia | Vasil Levski National Sports Academy, Sofia | Serbia by 8 wickets |
Final
| WT20I 2397 | 9 July | Greece | Turkey | Vasil Levski National Sports Academy, Sofia | Turkey by 10 runs |

=== 2025 Bulgaria Tri-Nation Series ===
| Pos | Team | Pld | W | L | NR | Pts | NRR |
|---|---|---|---|---|---|---|---|
| 1 | Gibraltar | 4 | 3 | 1 | 0 | 6 | 0.224 |
| 2 | Bulgaria | 4 | 2 | 2 | 0 | 4 | 0.728 |
| 3 | Turkey | 4 | 1 | 3 | 0 | 2 | −0.715 |

Source: ESPNcricinfo

Round-robin
| No. | Date | Team 1 | Team 2 | Venue | Result |
|---|---|---|---|---|---|
| T20I 3295 | 10 July | Bulgaria | Gibraltar | Vasil Levski National Sports Academy, Sofia | Gibraltar by 6 wickets |
| T20I 3297 | 10 July | Bulgaria | Turkey | Vasil Levski National Sports Academy, Sofia | Bulgaria by 8 wickets |
| T20I 3300 | 11 July | Gibraltar | Turkey | Vasil Levski National Sports Academy, Sofia | Gibraltar by 7 wickets |
| T20I 3302 | 11 July | Bulgaria | Gibraltar | Vasil Levski National Sports Academy, Sofia | Bulgaria by 6 wickets |
| T20I 3306 | 12 July | Bulgaria | Turkey | Vasil Levski National Sports Academy, Sofia | Turkey by 59 runs |
| T20I 3308 | 12 July | Gibraltar | Turkey | Vasil Levski National Sports Academy, Sofia | Gibraltar by 5 wickets |
Final
| T20I 3312 | 13 July | Bulgaria | Gibraltar | Vasil Levski National Sports Academy, Sofia | Bulgaria by 8 wickets |

=== 2025 Pearl of Africa T20 Series ===
| Pos | Team | Pld | W | L | NR | Pts | NRR |
|---|---|---|---|---|---|---|---|
| 1 | Uganda | 6 | 6 | 0 | 0 | 12 | 1.458 |
| 2 | United Arab Emirates | 6 | 4 | 2 | 0 | 8 | 2.032 |
| 3 | Kenya | 6 | 2 | 4 | 0 | 4 | −0.855 |
| 4 | Nigeria | 6 | 0 | 6 | 0 | 0 | −2.734 |

Updated to match(es) played on complete (Matches involving Namibia A are not included in the points table). Source: ESPNcricinfo

Round-robin
| No. | Date | Team 1 | Team 2 | Venue | Result |
|---|---|---|---|---|---|
| 1st Match | 17 July | Uganda A | Namibia A | Entebbe Cricket Oval, Entebbe | Namibia A by 2 runs |
| T20I 3319 | 17 July | Kenya | Nigeria | Entebbe Cricket Oval, Entebbe | Kenya by 20 runs |
| T20I 3322 | 18 July | Uganda | Nigeria | Entebbe Cricket Oval, Entebbe | Uganda by 77 runs (DLS) |
| T20I 3323 | 18 July | Kenya | United Arab Emirates | Entebbe Cricket Oval, Entebbe | United Arab Emirates by 40 runs |
| 5th Match | 19 July | Namibia A | Nigeria | Entebbe Cricket Oval, Entebbe | Namibia A by 8 wickets |
| T20I 3330 | 19 July | Uganda | United Arab Emirates | Entebbe Cricket Oval, Entebbe | Uganda by 6 runs |
| T20I 3340 | 21 July | Nigeria | United Arab Emirates | Entebbe Cricket Oval, Entebbe | United Arab Emirates by 7 wickets |
| T20I 3341 | 21 July | Uganda | Kenya | Entebbe Cricket Oval, Entebbe | Uganda by 28 runs |
| 9th Match | 22 July | Kenya | Namibia A | Entebbe Cricket Oval, Entebbe | Kenya by 3 wickets (DLS) |
| T20I 3346 | 22 July | Uganda | Nigeria | Entebbe Cricket Oval, Entebbe | Uganda by 38 runs |
| T20I 3354 | 23 July | Kenya | United Arab Emirates | Entebbe Cricket Oval, Entebbe | United Arab Emirates by 7 wickets |
| 12th Match | 23 July | Uganda A | Namibia A | Entebbe Cricket Oval, Entebbe | Uganda A by 3 runs |
| T20I 3363 | 25 July | Uganda | Kenya | Entebbe Cricket Oval, Entebbe | Uganda by 6 wickets |
| 14th Match | 25 July | Namibia A | Nigeria | Entebbe Cricket Oval, Entebbe | Nigeria by 6 runs |
| T20I 3372 | 26 July | Nigeria | United Arab Emirates | Entebbe Cricket Oval, Entebbe | United Arab Emirates by 53 runs |
| 16th Match | 26 July | Kenya | Namibia A | Entebbe Cricket Oval, Entebbe | Kenya by 3 runs |
| T20I 3380 | 27 July | Kenya | Nigeria | Entebbe Cricket Oval, Entebbe | Kenya by 6 wickets |
| T20I 3382 | 27 July | Uganda | United Arab Emirates | Entebbe Cricket Oval, Entebbe | Uganda by 8 runs |

=== 2025 Asia Pacific Cricket Champions Trophy ===
| Pos | Team | Pld | W | L | NR | Pts | NRR |
|---|---|---|---|---|---|---|---|
| 1 | Malaysia | 6 | 6 | 0 | 0 | 12 | 3.173 |
| 2 | Hong Kong | 6 | 4 | 2 | 0 | 8 | 0.872 |
| 3 | Singapore | 6 | 2 | 4 | 0 | 4 | −1.643 |
| 4 | Samoa | 6 | 0 | 6 | 0 | 0 | −1.977 |

Source: ESPNcricinfo

Round-robin
| No. | Date | Team 1 | Team 2 | Venue | Result |
|---|---|---|---|---|---|
| T20I 3320 | 18 July | Hong Kong | Malaysia | Singapore National Cricket Ground, Singapore | Malaysia by 5 wickets |
| T20I 3321 | 18 July | Singapore | Samoa | Singapore National Cricket Ground, Singapore | Singapore by 52 runs |
| T20I 3327 | 19 July | Singapore | Malaysia | Singapore National Cricket Ground, Singapore | Malaysia by 6 wickets |
| T20I 3328 | 19 July | Hong Kong | Samoa | Singapore National Cricket Ground, Singapore | Hong Kong by 54 runs |
| T20I 3333 | 20 July | Singapore | Hong Kong | Singapore National Cricket Ground, Singapore | Hong Kong by 52 runs |
| T20I 3334 | 20 July | Malaysia | Samoa | Singapore National Cricket Ground, Singapore | Malaysia by 6 wickets |
| T20I 3343 | 22 July | Hong Kong | Malaysia | Singapore National Cricket Ground, Singapore | Malaysia by 7 wickets |
| T20I 3344 | 22 July | Singapore | Samoa | Singapore National Cricket Ground, Singapore | Singapore by 3 wickets |
| T20I 3352 | 23 July | Hong Kong | Samoa | Singapore National Cricket Ground, Singapore | Hong Kong by 3 wickets |
| T20I 3353 | 23 July | Singapore | Malaysia | Singapore National Cricket Ground, Singapore | Malaysia by 65 runs |
| T20I 3358 | 24 July | Malaysia | Samoa | Singapore National Cricket Ground, Singapore | Malaysia by 6 wickets |
| T20I 3359 | 24 July | Singapore | Hong Kong | Singapore National Cricket Ground, Singapore | Hong Kong by 52 runs |
Final
| T20I 3370 | 26 July | Hong Kong | Malaysia | Singapore National Cricket Ground, Singapore | Malaysia by 10 wickets |

=== 2025 Rwanda Tri-Nation Series ===
| Pos | Team | Pld | W | L | NR | Pts | NRR |
|---|---|---|---|---|---|---|---|
| 1 | Bahrain | 8 | 8 | 0 | 0 | 16 | 2.602 |
| 2 | Malawi | 8 | 2 | 6 | 0 | 4 | −0.964 |
| 3 | Rwanda | 8 | 2 | 6 | 0 | 4 | −1.635 |

Source: ESPNcricinfo

Round-robin
| No. | Date | Team 1 | Team 2 | Venue | Result |
|---|---|---|---|---|---|
| T20I 3325 | 18 July | Rwanda | Bahrain | Gahanga International Cricket Stadium, Kigali | Bahrain by 8 wickets |
| T20I 3329 | 19 July | Bahrain | Malawi | Gahanga International Cricket Stadium, Kigali | Bahrain by 9 wickets |
| T20I 3331 | 19 July | Rwanda | Malawi | Gahanga International Cricket Stadium, Kigali | Rwanda by 6 wickets |
| T20I 3335 | 20 July | Bahrain | Malawi | Gahanga International Cricket Stadium, Kigali | Bahrain by 9 wickets |
| T20I 3337 | 20 July | Rwanda | Bahrain | Gahanga International Cricket Stadium, Kigali | Bahrain by 7 wickets |
| T20I 3345 | 22 July | Rwanda | Malawi | Gahanga International Cricket Stadium, Kigali | Rwanda by 4 wickets |
| T20I 3348 | 22 July | Rwanda | Bahrain | Gahanga International Cricket Stadium, Kigali | Bahrain by 112 runs |
| T20I 3355 | 23 July | Rwanda | Malawi | Gahanga International Cricket Stadium, Kigali | Malawi by 6 wickets |
| T20I 3356 | 23 July | Bahrain | Malawi | Gahanga International Cricket Stadium, Kigali | Bahrain by 45 runs |
| T20I 3364 | 25 July | Rwanda | Bahrain | Gahanga International Cricket Stadium, Kigali | Bahrain by 114 runs |
| T20I 3366 | 25 July | Bahrain | Malawi | Gahanga International Cricket Stadium, Kigali | Bahrain by 8 wickets |
| T20I 3375 | 26 July | Rwanda | Malawi | Gahanga International Cricket Stadium, Kigali | Malawi by 9 wickets |
Final
| T20I 3383 | 27 July | Bahrain | Malawi | Gahanga International Cricket Stadium, Kigali | Bahrain by 94 runs |

=== 2025 Finland Women's Tri-Nation Series ===
| Pos | Team | Pld | W | L | NR | Pts | NRR |
|---|---|---|---|---|---|---|---|
| 1 | Switzerland | 4 | 4 | 0 | 0 | 8 | 1.688 |
| 2 | Finland | 4 | 1 | 3 | 0 | 2 | −0.771 |
| 3 | Estonia | 4 | 1 | 3 | 0 | 2 | −1.055 |

Source: ESPNcricinfo

Round-robin
| No. | Date | Team 1 | Team 2 | Venue | Result |
|---|---|---|---|---|---|
| WT20I 2400 | 18 July | Finland | Switzerland | Kerava National Cricket Ground, Kerava | Switzerland by 7 wickets |
| WT20I 2401 | 18 July | Estonia | Switzerland | Kerava National Cricket Ground, Kerava | Switzerland by 5 wickets |
| WT20I 2402 | 19 July | Finland | Estonia | Kerava National Cricket Ground, Kerava | Finland by 7 wickets |
| WT20I 2403 | 19 July | Finland | Switzerland | Kerava National Cricket Ground, Kerava | Switzerland by 9 wickets |
| WT20I 2404 | 19 July | Estonia | Switzerland | Kerava National Cricket Ground, Kerava | Switzerland by 76 runs |
| WT20I 2405 | 20 July | Finland | Estonia | Kerava National Cricket Ground, Kerava | Estonia by 33 runs |
Final
| WT20I 2408 | 20 July | Finland | Switzerland | Kerava National Cricket Ground, Kerava | Switzerland by 10 wickets |

=== Saudi Arabia in Qatar ===
T20I series
| No. | Date | Venue | Result |
|---|---|---|---|
| T20I 3326 | 18 July | West End Park International Cricket Stadium, Doha | Qatar by 1 run |
| T20I 3332 | 19 July | West End Park International Cricket Stadium, Doha | Saudi Arabia by 4 wickets |
| T20I 3342 | 21 July | West End Park International Cricket Stadium, Doha | Qatar by 4 wickets |
| T20I 3350 | 22 July | West End Park International Cricket Stadium, Doha | Qatar by 32 runs |
| T20I 3357 | 23 July | West End Park International Cricket Stadium, Doha | Match tied (Saudi Arabia won S/O) |

=== 2025 Women's T20 World Cup Africa Qualifier Division Two ===
| Pos | Team | Pld | W | L | NR | Pts | NRR | Qualification |
|---|---|---|---|---|---|---|---|---|
| 1 | Rwanda | 3 | 3 | 0 | 0 | 6 | 4.915 | Advanced to the semi-finals |
| 2 | Malawi | 3 | 2 | 1 | 0 | 4 | 1.283 | Advanced to the semi-finals |
| 3 | Cameroon | 3 | 1 | 2 | 0 | 2 | −0.875 | Advanced to the play-offs |
| 4 | Lesotho | 3 | 0 | 3 | 0 | 0 | −4.591 | Advanced to the play-offs |

Source: ESPNcricinfo

| Pos | Team | Pld | W | L | NR | Pts | NRR | Qualification |
|---|---|---|---|---|---|---|---|---|
| 1 | Sierra Leone | 3 | 3 | 0 | 0 | 6 | 4.587 | Advanced to the semi-finals |
| 2 | Botswana | 3 | 2 | 1 | 0 | 4 | 2.837 | Advanced to the semi-finals |
| 3 | Mozambique | 3 | 1 | 2 | 0 | 2 | −1.026 | Advanced to the play-offs |
| 4 | Eswatini | 3 | 0 | 3 | 0 | 0 | −5.800 | Advanced to the play-offs |

Source: ESPNcricinfo

Group stage
| No. | Date | Team 1 | Team 2 | Venue | Result |
|---|---|---|---|---|---|
| WT20I 2406 | 20 July | Lesotho | Rwanda | Botswana Cricket Association Oval 1, Gaborone | Rwanda by 10 wickets |
| WT20I 2407 | 20 July | Botswana | Eswatini | Botswana Cricket Association Oval 2, Gaborone | Botswana by 111 runs |
| WT20I 2409 | 20 July | Cameroon | Malawi | Botswana Cricket Association Oval 1, Gaborone | Malawi by 38 runs |
| WT20I 2410 | 20 July | Mozambique | Sierra Leone | Botswana Cricket Association Oval 2, Gaborone | Sierra Leone by 77 runs |
| WT20I 2412 | 21 July | Botswana | Mozambique | Botswana Cricket Association Oval 1, Gaborone | Botswana by 8 wickets |
| WT20I 2413 | 21 July | Malawi | Rwanda | Botswana Cricket Association Oval 2, Gaborone | Rwanda by 67 runs |
| WT20I 2414 | 21 July | Eswatini | Sierra Leone | Botswana Cricket Association Oval 1, Gaborone | Sierra Leone by 149 runs |
| WT20I 2415 | 21 July | Cameroon | Lesotho | Botswana Cricket Association Oval 2, Gaborone | Cameroon by 55 runs |
| WT20I 2417 | 23 July | Lesotho | Malawi | Botswana Cricket Association Oval 1, Gaborone | Malawi by 106 runs |
| WT20I 2418 | 23 July | Eswatini | Mozambique | Botswana Cricket Association Oval 2, Gaborone | Mozambique by 88 runs |
| WT20I 2419 | 23 July | Botswana | Sierra Leone | Botswana Cricket Association Oval , Gaborone | Sierra Leone by 5 wickets |
| WT20I 2420 | 23 July | Cameroon | Rwanda | Botswana Cricket Association Oval 2, Gaborone | Rwanda by 10 wickets |
5th Place Play-off Semi-finals
| WT20I 2423 | 24 July | Cameroon | Eswatini | Botswana Cricket Association Oval 2, Gaborone | Cameroon by 140 runs |
| WT20I 2424 | 24 July | Lesotho | Mozambique | Botswana Cricket Association Oval 2, Gaborone | Mozambique by 3 wickets |
Semi-finals
| WT20I 2422 | 24 July | Botswana | Rwanda | Botswana Cricket Association Oval 1, Gaborone | Rwanda by 35 runs |
| WT20I 2425 | 24 July | Malawi | Sierra Leone | Botswana Cricket Association Oval 1, Gaborone | Sierra Leone by 6 wickets |
3rd Place Play-off
| WT20I 2426 | 26 July | Botswana | Malawi | Botswana Cricket Association Oval 1, Gaborone | Botswana by 65 runs |
7th Place Play-off
| WT20I 2427 | 26 July | Eswatini | Lesotho | Botswana Cricket Association Oval 2, Gaborone | Lesotho by 48 runs |
5th Place Play-off
| WT20I 2428 | 26 July | Cameroon | Mozambique | Botswana Cricket Association Oval 2, Gaborone | Cameroon by 2 wickets |
Final
| WT20I 2429 | 26 July | Rwanda | Sierra Leone | Botswana Cricket Association Oval 1, Gaborone | Rwanda by 51 runs |

=== 2025 Budapest Cup ===
| Pos | Team | Pld | W | L | NR | Pts | NRR |
|---|---|---|---|---|---|---|---|
| 1 | Austria | 3 | 3 | 0 | 0 | 6 | 2.559 |
| 2 | Romania | 3 | 2 | 1 | 0 | 4 | 1.739 |
| 3 | Hungary | 3 | 1 | 2 | 0 | 2 | −0.596 |
| 4 | Luxembourg | 3 | 0 | 3 | 0 | 0 | −3.017 |

Source: ESPNcricinfo

Round-robin
| No. | Date | Team 1 | Team 2 | Venue | Result |
|---|---|---|---|---|---|
| T20I 3362 | 25 July | Austria | Romania | GB Oval, Sződliget | Austria by 7 wickets |
| T20I 3365 | 25 July | Hungary | Romania | GB Oval, Sződliget | Romania by 10 wickets |
| T20I 3368 | 25 July | Hungary | Luxembourg | GB Oval, Sződliget | Hungary by 70 runs |
| T20I 3371 | 26 July | Luxembourg | Romania | GB Oval, Sződliget | Romania by 45 runs |
| T20I 3373 | 26 July | Hungary | Austria | GB Oval, Sződliget | Austria by 4 wickets |
| T20I 3377 | 26 July | Austria | Luxembourg | GB Oval, Sződliget | Austria by 66 runs |
Third-place play-off
| T20I 3379 | 27 July | Hungary | Luxembourg | GB Oval, Sződliget | Hungary by 37 runs |
Final
| T20I 3381 | 27 July | Austria | Romania | GB Oval, Sződliget | No result |

=== Finland in Estonia ===
T20I series
| No. | Date | Venue | Result |
|---|---|---|---|
| T20I 3367 | 25 July | Estonian National Cricket and Rugby Field, Tallinn | Finland by 16 runs |
| T20I 3376 | 26 July | Estonian National Cricket and Rugby Field, Tallinn | Estonia by 4 wickets |
| T20I 3384 | 27 July | Estonian National Cricket and Rugby Field, Tallinn | Finland by 5 wickets |

=== 2025 Baltic Cup ===
| Pos | Team | Pld | W | L | NR | Pts | NRR |
|---|---|---|---|---|---|---|---|
| 1 | Estonia | 3 | 3 | 0 | 0 | 6 | 3.738 |
| 2 | Finland | 3 | 2 | 1 | 0 | 4 | 1.721 |
| 3 | Latvia | 3 | 1 | 2 | 0 | 2 | 0.700 |
| 4 | Lithuania | 3 | 0 | 3 | 0 | 0 | −6.000 |

Source: Cricheroes

Round-robin
| No. | Date | Team 1 | Team 2 | Venue | Result |
|---|---|---|---|---|---|
| 1st Match | 26 July | Estonia | Lithuania | Estonian National Cricket and Rugby Field, Tallinn | Estonia by 154 runs |
| 2nd Match | 26 July | Finland | Latvia | Estonian National Cricket and Rugby Field 2, Tallinn | Finland by 4 runs |
| T20I 3376 | 26 July | Estonia | Finland | Estonian National Cricket and Rugby Field, Tallinn | Estonia by 4 wickets |
| 4th Match | 26 July | Latvia | Lithuania | Estonian National Cricket and Rugby Field 2, Tallinn | Latvia by 90 runs |
| 5th Match | 27 July | Estonia | Latvia | Estonian National Cricket and Rugby Field, Tallinn | Estonia by 44 runs |
| 6th Match | 27 July | Finland | Lithuania | Estonian National Cricket and Rugby Field 2, Tallinn | Finland by 116 runs |

== August ==
=== Gibraltar women in Estonia ===
WT20I series
| No. | Date | Venue | Result |
|---|---|---|---|
| WT20I 2430 | 2 August | Estonian National Cricket and Rugby Field 2, Tallinn | Estonia by 26 runs |
| WT20I 2431 | 2 August | Estonian National Cricket and Rugby Field 2, Tallinn | Gibraltar by 7 wickets |
| WT20I 2432 | 3 August | Estonian National Cricket and Rugby Field 2, Tallinn | Gibraltar by 34 runs |

=== Switzerland in Estonia ===
T20I series
| No. | Date | Venue | Result |
|---|---|---|---|
| T20I 3387 | 2 August | Estonian National Cricket and Rugby Field, Tallinn | Switzerland by 72 runs |
| T20I 3389 | 3 August | Estonian National Cricket and Rugby Field, Tallinn | Switzerland by 15 runs |
| T20I 3390 | 3 August | Estonian National Cricket and Rugby Field, Tallinn | Switzerland by 41 runs |

=== Cyprus in Croatia ===
T20I series
| No. | Date | Venue | Result |
|---|---|---|---|
| T20I 3392 | 7 August | Mladost Cricket Ground, Zagreb | Cyprus by 58 runs |
| T20I 3394 | 7 August | Mladost Cricket Ground, Zagreb | Cyprus by 7 wickets |
| T20I 3396 | 8 August | Mladost Cricket Ground, Zagreb | Cyprus by 3 wickets |
| T20I 3398 | 8 August | Mladost Cricket Ground, Zagreb | Cyprus by 52 runs |

=== 2025 Viking Cup ===
| Pos | Team | Pld | W | L | NR | Pts | NRR |
|---|---|---|---|---|---|---|---|
| 1 | Austria | 3 | 3 | 0 | 0 | 6 | 0.904 |
| 2 | Norway | 3 | 2 | 1 | 0 | 4 | 0.310 |
| 3 | Sweden | 3 | 1 | 2 | 0 | 2 | −0.101 |
| 4 | France | 3 | 0 | 3 | 0 | 0 | −1.077 |

Source: ESPNcricinfo

Round-robin
| No. | Date | Team 1 | Team 2 | Venue | Result |
|---|---|---|---|---|---|
| T20I 3393 | 7 August | Austria | Norway | Botkyrka Cricket Center, Stockholm | Austria by 4 wickets |
| T20I 3395 | 7 August | Sweden | France | Botkyrka Cricket Center, Stockholm | Sweden by 34 runs |
| T20I 3397 | 8 August | France | Norway | Botkyrka Cricket Center, Stockholm | Norway by 22 runs |
| T20I 3399 | 8 August | Sweden | Austria | Botkyrka Cricket Center, Stockholm | Austria by 4 wickets |
| T20I 3400 | 9 August | Sweden | Norway | Botkyrka Cricket Center, Stockholm | Norway by 23 runs |
| T20I 3401 | 9 August | Austria | France | Botkyrka Cricket Center, Stockholm | Austria by 6 wickets |
3rd place play-off
| T20I 3402 | 10 August | Sweden | France | Botkyrka Cricket Center, Stockholm | France by 2 wickets |
Final
| T20I 3404 | 10 August | Austria | Norway | Botkyrka Cricket Center, Stockholm | Austria by 8 wickets |

=== Cambodia women in Singapore ===
WT20I series (Women's Friendship Cup)
| No. | Date | Venue | Result |
|---|---|---|---|
| WT20I 2436 | 13 August | Singapore National Cricket Ground, Singapore | Singapore by 125 runs |
| WT20I 2437 | 14 August | Singapore National Cricket Ground, Singapore | Singapore by 114 runs |
| WT20I 2438 | 16 August | Singapore National Cricket Ground, Singapore | Singapore by 102 runs |

=== Papua New Guinea in Guernsey ===
T20I match
| No. | Date | Venue | Result |
|---|---|---|---|
| T20I 3406 | 14 August | King George V Sports Ground, Castel | Papua New Guinea by 6 wickets |

=== 2025 Norway Tri-Nation Series ===
| Pos | Team | Pld | W | L | NR | Pts | NRR |
|---|---|---|---|---|---|---|---|
| 1 | Norway | 2 | 2 | 0 | 0 | 4 | 1.126 |
| 2 | Sweden | 2 | 1 | 1 | 0 | 2 | 1.695 |
| 3 | Hungary | 2 | 0 | 2 | 0 | 0 | −2.775 |

Source: European Cricket Network

Round-robin
| No. | Date | Team 1 | Team 2 | Venue | Result |
|---|---|---|---|---|---|
| T20I 3408 | 17 August | Norway | Sweden | Stubberudmyra Cricket Ground, Oslo | Norway by 3 wickets |
| T20I 3409 | 17 August | Hungary | Sweden | Stubberudmyra Cricket Ground, Oslo | Sweden by 79 runs |
| T20I 3410 | 17 August | Norway | Hungary | Stubberudmyra Cricket Ground, Oslo | Norway by 32 runs |

=== 2025 Women's T20 World Cup Europe Qualifier Division One ===
| Pos | Team | Pld | W | L | NR | Pts | NRR | Qualification |
|---|---|---|---|---|---|---|---|---|
| 1 | Ireland | 6 | 6 | 0 | 0 | 12 | 3.309 | Advanced to the global qualifier |
| 2 | Netherlands | 6 | 4 | 2 | 0 | 8 | 2.833 | Advanced to the global qualifier |
| 3 | Italy | 6 | 2 | 4 | 0 | 4 | −0.906 | |
| 4 | Germany | 6 | 0 | 6 | 0 | 0 | −5.611 | |

Source: ESPNcricinfo

Round-robin
| No. | Date | Team 1 | Team 2 | Venue | Result |
|---|---|---|---|---|---|
| WT20I 2439 | 20 August | Netherlands | Italy | Hazelaarweg Stadium, Rotterdam | Netherlands by 43 runs |
| WT20I 2440 | 20 August | Germany | Ireland | Hazelaarweg Stadium, Rotterdam | Ireland by 10 wickets |
| WT20I 2441 | 21 August | Netherlands | Ireland | Hazelaarweg Stadium, Rotterdam | Ireland by 8 wickets |
| WT20I 2442 | 21 August | Germany | Italy | Hazelaarweg Stadium, Rotterdam | Italy by 4 wickets |
| WT20I 2443 | 23 August | Ireland | Italy | Hazelaarweg Stadium, Rotterdam | Ireland by 63 runs |
| WT20I 2444 | 23 August | Netherlands | Germany | Hazelaarweg Stadium, Rotterdam | Netherlands by 202 runs |
| WT20I 2445 | 24 August | Germany | Ireland | Hazelaarweg Stadium, Rotterdam | Ireland by 179 runs |
| WT20I 2446 | 24 August | Netherlands | Italy | Hazelaarweg Stadium, Rotterdam | Netherlands by 7 wickets |
| WT20I 2447 | 26 August | Germany | Italy | Hazelaarweg Stadium, Rotterdam | Italy by 8 wickets |
| WT20I 2448 | 26 August | Netherlands | Ireland | Hazelaarweg Stadium, Rotterdam | Ireland by 7 wickets |
| WT20I 2449 | 27 August | Netherlands | Germany | Hazelaarweg Stadium, Rotterdam | Netherlands by 65 runs |
| WT20I 2450 | 27 August | Ireland | Italy | Hazelaarweg Stadium, Rotterdam | Ireland by 33 runs |

=== Czech Republic in Romania ===
T20I series
| No. | Date | Venue | Result |
|---|---|---|---|
| T20I 3411 | 21 August | Moara Vlasiei Cricket Ground, Ilfov County | Czech Republic by 18 runs |
| T20I 3412 | 21 August | Moara Vlasiei Cricket Ground, Ilfov County | Romania by 18 runs |
| T20I 3413 | 22 August | Moara Vlasiei Cricket Ground, Ilfov County | Romania by 25 runs |
| T20I 3414 | 22 August | Moara Vlasiei Cricket Ground, Ilfov County | Czech Republic by 4 wickets |

=== Belgium in Austria ===
T20I series
| No. | Date | Venue | Result |
|---|---|---|---|
| T20I 3415 | 23 August | Velden Cricket Ground, Latschach | Austria by 6 wickets |
| T20I 3416 | 23 August | Velden Cricket Ground, Latschach | Austria by 38 runs (DLS) |
| T20I 3417 | 24 August | Velden Cricket Ground, Latschach | Austria by 4 wickets |
| T20I 3418 | 24 August | Velden Cricket Ground, Latschach | Austria by 4 wickets |

=== 2025 Eastern Europe Cup ===
| Pos | Team | Pld | W | L | NR | Pts | NRR |
|---|---|---|---|---|---|---|---|
| 1 | Serbia | 4 | 4 | 0 | 0 | 8 | 1.826 |
| 2 | Hungary | 4 | 1 | 2 | 1 | 3 | −0.562 |
| 3 | Croatia | 4 | 0 | 3 | 1 | 1 | −1.722 |

Source: ESPNcricinfo

Round-robin
| No. | Date | Team 1 | Team 2 | Venue | Result |
|---|---|---|---|---|---|
| T20I 3419 | 29 August | Hungary | Serbia | GB Oval, Sződliget | Serbia by 6 wickets |
| T20I 3420 | 29 August | Hungary | Croatia | GB Oval, Sződliget | Hungary by 4 wickets |
| T20I 3422 | 30 August | Croatia | Serbia | GB Oval, Sződliget | Serbia by 84 runs |
| T20I 3423 | 30 August | Hungary | Serbia | GB Oval, Sződliget | Serbia by 5 runs (DLS) |
| T20I 3425a | 30 August | Hungary | Croatia | GB Oval, Sződliget | Match abandoned |
| T20I 3428 | 31 August | Croatia | Serbia | GB Oval, Sződliget | Serbia by 8 wickets |
Final
| T20I 3430 | 31 August | Hungary | Serbia | GB Oval, Sződliget | Hungary by 34 runs |

=== 2025 Women's Nordic Cup ===
| Pos | Team | Pld | W | L | NR | Pts | NRR |
|---|---|---|---|---|---|---|---|
| 1 | Germany | 4 | 4 | 0 | 0 | 8 | 3.453 |
| 2 | Sweden | 4 | 3 | 1 | 0 | 6 | 1.250 |
| 3 | Denmark | 4 | 2 | 2 | 0 | 4 | −0.180 |
| 4 | Norway | 4 | 1 | 3 | 0 | 2 | −2.514 |
| 5 | Finland | 4 | 0 | 4 | 0 | 0 | −2.161 |

Source: ESPNcricinfo

Round-robin
| No. | Date | Team 1 | Team 2 | Venue | Result |
|---|---|---|---|---|---|
| WT20I 2451 | 29 August | Finland | Germany | Ishoj Cricket Club, Ishøj | Germany by 8 wickets |
| WT20I 2452 | 29 August | Norway | Sweden | Albertslund Cricket Club, Albertslund | Sweden by 94 runs |
| WT20I 2453 | 30 August | Finland | Norway | Ishoj Cricket Club, Ishøj | Norway by 1 wicket |
| WT20I 2454 | 30 August | Denmark | Sweden | Albertslund Cricket Club, Albertslund | Sweden by 7 runs |
| WT20I 2455 | 30 August | Denmark | Finland | Albertslund Cricket Club, Albertslund | Denmark by 7 wickets |
| WT20I 2456 | 30 August | Germany | Norway | Ishoj Cricket Club, Ishøj | Germany by 78 runs |
| WT20I 2459 | 31 August | Denmark | Norway | Albertslund Cricket Club, Albertslund | Denmark by 7 wickets |
| WT20I 2460 | 31 August | Germany | Sweden | Ishoj Cricket Club, Ishøj | Germany by 74 runs |
| WT20I 2463 | 31 August | Finland | Sweden | Albertslund Cricket Club, Albertslund | Sweden by 73 runs |
| WT20I 2464 | 31 August | Denmark | Germany | Ishoj Cricket Club, Ishøj | Germany by 64 runs |

=== Switzerland in Guernsey ===
T20I series
| No. | Date | Venue | Result |
|---|---|---|---|
| T20I 3424 | 30 August | King George V Sports Ground, Castel | No result |
| T20I 3427 | 30 August | King George V Sports Ground, Castel | No result |
| T20I 3429 | 31 August | King George V Sports Ground, Castel | Guernsey by 7 wickets |

=== 2025 Women's T20 World Cup Africa Qualifier Division One ===
| Pos | Team | Pld | W | L | NR | Pts | NRR | Qualification |
|---|---|---|---|---|---|---|---|---|
| 1 | Zimbabwe | 3 | 3 | 0 | 0 | 6 | 2.173 | Advanced to the semi-finals |
| 2 | Namibia | 3 | 2 | 1 | 0 | 4 | 3.377 | Advanced to the semi-finals |
| 3 | Nigeria | 3 | 1 | 2 | 0 | 2 | 0.040 | Advanced to the play-offs |
| 4 | Sierra Leone | 3 | 0 | 3 | 0 | 0 | −5.442 | Advanced to the play-offs |

Source: ESPNcricinfo

| Pos | Team | Pld | W | L | NR | Pts | NRR | Qualification |
|---|---|---|---|---|---|---|---|---|
| 1 | Tanzania | 3 | 3 | 0 | 0 | 6 | 0.817 | Advanced to the semi-finals |
| 2 | Uganda | 3 | 2 | 1 | 0 | 4 | 0.536 | Advanced to the semi-finals |
| 3 | Rwanda | 3 | 1 | 2 | 0 | 2 | −0.545 | Advanced to the play-offs |
| 4 | Kenya | 3 | 0 | 3 | 0 | 0 | −0.795 | Advanced to the play-offs |

Source: ESPNcricinfo

Group stage
| No. | Date | Team 1 | Team 2 | Venue | Result |
|---|---|---|---|---|---|
| WT20I 2457 | 31 August | Nigeria | Sierra Leone | Namibia Cricket Ground, Windhoek | Nigeria by 96 runs |
| WT20I 2458 | 31 August | Kenya | Rwanda | High Performance Oval, Windhoek | Rwanda by 6 wickets |
| WT20I 2461 | 31 August | Namibia | Zimbabwe | Namibia Cricket Ground, Windhoek | Zimbabwe by 32 runs |
| WT20I 2462 | 31 August | Tanzania | Uganda | High Performance Oval, Windhoek | Tanzania by 1 run |
| WT20I 2466 | 1 September | Sierra Leone | Zimbabwe | Namibia Cricket Ground, Windhoek | Zimbabwe by 10 wickets |
| WT20I 2467 | 1 September | Kenya | Tanzania | High Performance Oval, Windhoek | Tanzania by 30 runs |
| WT20I 2469 | 1 September | Namibia | Nigeria | Namibia Cricket Ground, Windhoek | Namibia by 8 wickets |
| WT20I 2470 | 1 September | Rwanda | Uganda | High Performance Oval, Windhoek | Uganda by 8 wickets |
| WT20I 2472 | 3 September | Rwanda | Tanzania | Namibia Cricket Ground, Windhoek | Tanzania by 18 runs |
| WT20I 2473 | 3 September | Namibia | Sierra Leone | High Performance Oval, Windhoek | Namibia by 152 runs |
| WT20I 2474 | 3 September | Kenya | Uganda | Namibia Cricket Ground, Windhoek | Uganda by 8 wickets |
| WT20I 2475 | 3 September | Nigeria | Zimbabwe | High Performance Oval, Windhoek | Zimbabwe by 10 wickets |
Semi-finals
| WT20I 2477 | 4 September | Uganda | Zimbabwe | Namibia Cricket Ground, Windhoek | Zimbabwe by 5 wickets |
| WT20I 2480 | 4 September | Namibia | Tanzania | Namibia Cricket Ground, Windhoek | Namibia by 8 wickets |
5th–8th place semi-finals
| WT20I 2478 | 4 September | Kenya | Nigeria | High Performance Oval, Windhoek | Kenya by 7 runs |
| WT20I 2481 | 4 September | Rwanda | Sierra Leone | High Performance Oval, Windhoek | Rwanda by 50 runs |
7th Place play-off
| WT20I 2484 | 6 September | Nigeria | Sierra Leone | High Performance Oval, Windhoek | Nigeria by 85 runs |
5th Place play-off
| WT20I 2487 | 6 September | Kenya | Rwanda | High Performance Oval, Windhoek | Rwanda by 6 runs |
3rd Place play-off
| WT20I 2485 | 6 September | Tanzania | Uganda | Namibia Cricket Ground, Windhoek | Tanzania by 6 runs |
Final
| WT20I 2488 | 6 September | Namibia | Zimbabwe | Namibia Cricket Ground, Windhoek | Zimbabwe by 9 wickets |

=== 2025 UK Women's Tri-Nation Series ===
| Pos | Team | Pld | W | L | NR | Pts | NRR |
|---|---|---|---|---|---|---|---|
| 1 | Brazil | 5 | 4 | 0 | 1 | 9 | 4.617 |
| 2 | Isle of Man | 4 | 1 | 2 | 1 | 3 | −3.307 |
| 3 | Jersey | 5 | 0 | 3 | 2 | 2 | −2.687 |

Source: ESPNcricinfo

Round-robin
| No. | Date | Team 1 | Team 2 | Venue | Result |
|---|---|---|---|---|---|
| WT20I 2465 | 31 August | Brazil | Isle of Man | New Farnley Cricket Club, Leeds | Brazil by 10 wickets |
| WT20I 2468 | 1 September | Brazil | Isle of Man | New Farnley Cricket Club, Leeds | Brazil by 105 runs |
| WT20I 2470a | 1 September | Isle of Man | Jersey | New Farnley Cricket Club, Leeds | Match abandoned |
| WT20I 2471 | 2 September | Isle of Man | Jersey | New Farnley Cricket Club, Leeds | Isle of Man by 7 wickets |
| WT20I 2473a | 3 September | Brazil | Jersey | New Farnley Cricket Club, Leeds | Match abandoned |
| WT20I 2476 | 3 September | Brazil | Jersey | New Farnley Cricket Club, Leeds | Brazil by 20 runs (DLS) |
| WT20I 2479 | 4 September | Brazil | Jersey | New Farnley Cricket Club, Leeds | Brazil by 8 wickets |

== September ==
=== Japan women in Fiji ===
WT20I series
| No. | Date | Venue | Result |
|---|---|---|---|
| WT20I 2482 | 5 September | Albert Park Ground 1, Suva | Japan by 23 runs |
| WT20I 2483 | 6 September | Albert Park Ground 1, Suva | Japan by 104 runs |

=== Czech Republic women in Estonia ===
WT20I series
| No. | Date | Venue | Result |
|---|---|---|---|
| WT20I 2486 | 6 September | Estonian National Cricket and Rugby Ground, Tallinn | Estonia by 1 wicket |
| WT20I 2489 | 6 September | Estonian National Cricket and Rugby Ground, Tallinn | Estonia by 115 runs |
| WT20I 2490 | 7 September | Estonian National Cricket and Rugby Ground, Tallinn | Estonia by 7 wickets |

=== Sweden in Isle of Man ===
T20I series
| No. | Date | Venue | Result |
|---|---|---|---|
| T20I 3438 | 6 September | Cronkbourne Sports and Social Club Ground, Tromode | Sweden by 10 wickets |
| T20I 3440 | 6 September | Cronkbourne Sports and Social Club Ground, Tromode | Sweden by 3 wickets |
| T20I 3440a | 7 September | Cronkbourne Sports and Social Club Ground, Tromode | Match abandoned |
| T20I 3441a | 7 September | Cronkbourne Sports and Social Club Ground, Tromode | Match abandoned |

=== 2025 Women's T20 World Cup EAP Qualifier ===
| Pos | Team | Pld | W | L | NR | Pts | NRR | Qualification |
|---|---|---|---|---|---|---|---|---|
| 1 | Papua New Guinea | 3 | 2 | 1 | 0 | 4 | 3.333 | Advanced to the semi-finals |
| 2 | Japan | 3 | 2 | 1 | 0 | 4 | 2.283 | Advanced to the semi-finals |
| 3 | Samoa | 3 | 2 | 1 | 0 | 4 | 0.156 | Advanced to the play-offs |
| 4 | Philippines | 3 | 0 | 3 | 0 | 0 | −6.756 | Advanced to the play-offs |

Source: ESPNcricinfo

| Pos | Team | Pld | W | L | NR | Pts | NRR | Qualification |
|---|---|---|---|---|---|---|---|---|
| 1 | Vanuatu | 3 | 3 | 0 | 0 | 6 | 2.254 | Advanced to the semi-finals |
| 2 | Indonesia | 3 | 2 | 1 | 0 | 4 | 2.583 | Advanced to the semi-finals |
| 3 | Fiji | 3 | 1 | 2 | 0 | 2 | −1.953 | Advanced to the play-offs |
| 4 | Cook Islands | 3 | 0 | 3 | 0 | 0 | −3.052 | Advanced to the play-offs |

Source: ESPNcricinfo

Group stage
| No. | Date | Team 1 | Team 2 | Venue | Result |
|---|---|---|---|---|---|
| WT20I 2491 | 9 September | Fiji | Cook Islands | Albert Park Ground 1, Suva | Fiji by 9 wickets |
| WT20I 2492 | 9 September | Japan | Papua New Guinea | Albert Park Ground 2, Suva | Papua New Guinea by 46 runs |
| WT20I 2493 | 9 September | Indonesia | Vanuatu | Albert Park Ground 1, Suva | Vanuatu by 7 runs |
| WT20I 2494 | 9 September | Philippines | Samoa | Albert Park Ground 2, Suva | Samoa by 9 wickets |
| WT20I 2495 | 10 September | Japan | Samoa | Albert Park Ground 1, Suva | Japan by 71 runs |
| WT20I 2496 | 10 September | Fiji | Indonesia | Albert Park Ground 2, Suva | Indonesia by 42 runs |
| WT20I 2497 | 10 September | Papua New Guinea | Philippines | Albert Park Ground 1, Suva | Papua New Guinea by 168 runs |
| WT20I 2498 | 10 September | Cook Islands | Vanuatu | Albert Park Ground 2, Suva | Vanuatu by 7 wickets |
| WT20I 2499 | 12 September | Cook Islands | Indonesia | Albert Park Ground 1, Suva | Indonesia by 120 runs |
| WT20I 2500 | 12 September | Japan | Philippines | Albert Park Ground 2, Suva | Japan by 111 runs |
| WT20I 2501 | 12 September | Fiji | Vanuatu | Albert Park Ground 1, Suva | Vanuatu by 89 runs |
| WT20I 2502 | 12 September | Papua New Guinea | Samoa | Albert Park Ground 2, Suva | Samoa by 13 runs |
5th–8th place semi-finals
| WT20I 2504 | 13 September | Cook Islands | Samoa | Albert Park Ground 1, Suva | Samoa by 62 runs |
| WT20I 2505 | 13 September | Fiji | Philippines | Albert Park Ground 2, Suva | Fiji by 8 wickets |
Semi-finals
| WT20I 2506 | 13 September | Indonesia | Papua New Guinea | Albert Park Ground 1, Suva | Papua New Guinea by 5 wickets |
| WT20I 2507 | 13 September | Japan | Vanuatu | Albert Park Ground 2, Suva | Vanuatu by 22 runs |
7th Place play-off
| WT20I 2512 | 15 September | Cook Islands | Philippines | Albert Park Ground 2, Suva | Philippines by 4 wickets |
5th Place play-off
| WT20I 2513 | 15 September | Fiji | Samoa | Albert Park Ground 1, Suva | Fiji by 5 wickets |
3rd Place play-off
| WT20I 2514 | 15 September | Indonesia | Japan | Albert Park Ground 2, Suva | Indonesia by 8 wickets |
Final
| WT20I 2515 | 15 September | Papua New Guinea | Vanuatu | Albert Park Ground 1, Suva | Papua New Guinea by 9 wickets |

=== Mozambique in Eswatini ===
T20I series
| No. | Date | Venue | Result |
|---|---|---|---|
| T20I 3447 | 12 September | Malkerns Country Club Oval, Malkerns | Eswatini by 31 runs |
| T20I 3448 | 12 September | Malkerns Country Club Oval, Malkerns | Eswatini by 5 runs |
| T20I 3451 | 13 September | Malkerns Country Club Oval, Malkerns | Eswatini by 74 runs |
| T20I 3452 | 13 September | Malkerns Country Club Oval, Malkerns | Match tied (Eswatini won S/O) |
| T20I 3454 | 14 September | Malkerns Country Club Oval, Malkerns | No result |

=== 2025 Luxembourg Women's Tri-Nation Series ===
| Pos | Team | Pld | W | L | NR | Pts | NRR |
|---|---|---|---|---|---|---|---|
| 1 | Switzerland | 2 | 2 | 0 | 0 | 4 | 1.907 |
| 2 | Austria | 2 | 1 | 1 | 0 | 2 | 1.368 |
| 3 | Luxembourg | 2 | 0 | 2 | 0 | 0 | −3.368 |

Source: ESPNcricinfo

Round-robin
| No. | Date | Team 1 | Team 2 | Venue | Result |
|---|---|---|---|---|---|
| WT20I 2503 | 12 September | Luxembourg | Switzerland | Pierre Werner Cricket Ground, Walferdange | Switzerland by 74 runs |
| WT20I 2508 | 13 September | Luxembourg | Austria | Pierre Werner Cricket Ground, Walferdange | Austria by 54 runs (DLS) |
| WT20I 2509 | 13 September | Austria | Switzerland | Pierre Werner Cricket Ground, Walferdange | Switzerland by 6 wickets |
Third-place play-off
| WT20I 2510 | 14 September | Luxembourg | Austria | Pierre Werner Cricket Ground, Walferdange | Luxembourg by 8 wickets (DLS) |
Final
| WT20I 2511 | 14 September | Luxembourg | Switzerland | Pierre Werner Cricket Ground, Walferdange | Switzerland by 8 wickets |

== See also ==
- International cricket in 2025
