= List of Switzerland women Twenty20 International cricketers =

This is a list of Switzerland women Twenty20 International cricketers. A Twenty20 International is an international cricket match between two representative teams, each having Twenty20 International status, as determined by the International Cricket Council (ICC). A Twenty20 International is played under the rules of Twenty20 cricket.

This list includes all players who have played at least one T20I match for Switzerland and is arranged in the order of debut appearance. Where more than one player won their first cap in the same match, those players are initially listed alphabetically at the time of debut.

Switzerland women's team played their first WT20I match against Belgium on 28 May 2025 during their tour of Belgium.

== Key ==
General

- ‡ – Captain
- † – Wicket-keeper
- First – Year of debut
- Last – Year of latest game
- Mat – Number of matches played

Batting

- Runs – Runs scored in career
- HS – Highest score
- 50 – Number of half centuries
- Avg – Runs scored per dismissal
- * – Batter remained not out

Bowling

- Wkt – Wickets taken in career
- BBI – Best bowling in an innings
- Ave – Average runs per wicket

Fielding

- Ca – Catches taken
- St – Stumpings affected

== List of Players ==
Statistics are correct as of 31 July 2026

Switzerland women T20I cricketers
General					Batting				Bowling				Fielding		Ref
No.	Name	First	Last	Mat	Runs	HS	Avg	50	Balls	Wkt	BBI	Ave	Ca	St	Ref
1	Natalie Clarke	2025	2026	20	97	36	12.12	0	192	4	2/17	64.75	1	0	
2	Samiha Dabholkar	2025	2026	19	47	10	7.83	0	355	16	2/27	20.25	7	0	
3	Metty Fernandes	2025	2025	8	–	–	–	–	102	6	2/4	16.00	0	0	
4	Milly Holmes	2025	2025	5	12	9*	12.00	0	36	1	1/4	37.00	6	0	
5	Saranya Kotha	2025	2026	11	0	0	0.00	0	92	10	3/4	7.60	3	0	
6	Franziska Kuenburg†	2025	2026	16	324	49	32.40	0	–	–	–	–	5	1	
7	Danashi Medagoda‡	2025	2026	26	170	32*	15.45	0	231	7	2/11	40.42	8	0	
8	Laila Pickard	2025	2026	20	295	73*	17.35	1	–	–	–	–	5	0	
9	Meghna Rajan	2025	2026	26	812	95	58.00	6	495	24	3/2	17.08	18	0	
10	Ananya Srinivasan†	2025	2026	20	43	28*	8.60	0	–	–	–	–	12	3	
11	Sejal Vinod	2025	2026	17	30	18	6.00	0	282	18	3/11	18.44	2	0	
12	Jacqui Edmiston	2025	2025	5	22	22*	–	0	24	1	1/18	38.00	0	0	
13	Ramya Krishnamurthy	2025	2025	3	46	40	23.00	0	–	–	–	–	0	0	
14	Naina Saju	2025	2026	24	32	9	4.57	0	402	21	4/22	22.71	2	0	
15	Sreekumar Divya	2025	2026	11	40	12	6.66	0	–	–	–	–	4	0	
16	Mundra Parinitha	2025	2026	11	1	1	1.00	0	180	13	2/13	13.38	2	0	
17	Fulton Elizabet	2025	2025	3	9	5	4.50	0	–	–	–	–	2	0	
18	Amrita Sasidharan	2025	2026	15	293	63	19.53	2	–	–	–	–	5	0	
19	Shilpa Shankar†	2025	2025	1	–	–	–	–	–	–	–	–	1	0	
20	Samiha Konuganti	2026	2026	12	22	10	7.33	0	262	11	3/43	28.54	1	0	
21	Vani Dhanuka	2026	2026	9	221	58	27.62	1	163	9	2/18	14.00	4	0	
22	Melissa Pienaar	2026	2026	7	33	10	6.60	0	–	–	–	–	0	0	
23	Sunishka Gowda	2026	2026	2	1	1*	–	0	18	0	–	–	0	0	
