= Hofstade =

Hofstade can refer to:

- Hofstade (East Flanders), a sub-municipality of the city of Aalst, Belgium
- Hofstade (Flemish Brabant), a sub-municipality of Zemst, Belgium
