= Portugal women's national cricket team =

Cricket team

Portugal
- Flag of Portugal
- Association: Portuguese Cricket Federation

Personnel
- Captain: Sarah Foo-Ryland

International Cricket Council
- ICC status: Associate member (2005); Affiliate member (1995)
- ICC region: Europe

T20 Internationals
- First T20I: v. Norway at Santarem Cricket Ground, Albergaria; 7 April 2025
- Last T20I: v. Czech Republic at Vinoř Cricket Ground, Prague; 6 September 2026
T20Is	Played	Won/Lost
Total	9	6/3 (0 ties, 0 no results)
This year	6	4/2 (0 ties, 0 no results)
- As of 6 September 2026

The Portugal women's national cricket team represents Portugal in international women's cricket matches. Although Portugal has been an associate member of the International Cricket Council (ICC) since 2017, the women's team only made their debut in 2025.

== History ==
In April 2018, the International Cricket Council (ICC) granted full Women's Twenty20 International (WT20I) status to all its members. Therefore, all Twenty20 matches played between Uganda women and another international side since 1 July 2018 have been full WT20I matches.

Portugal women played their first Women's Twenty20 International (WT20I) game in 2025 against Norway at home, in a 3-match series. The team won the first match of series to claim the first ever win in international cricket. They went on to take the series 2–1.

7 April 2025
09:30
Scorecard

Portugal; 109/9 (20 overs)	v	Norway; 93 (16.4 overs)
Kiona Sequiera 37* (39); Ramya Immadi 3/24 (4 overs)		Anushka Gorad 11 (11); Gabriella Sequeira 3/14 (3.4 overs)

Portugal won by 16 runs
Santarem Cricket Ground, Santarem
Player of the match: Kiona Sequiera (Por)

- Portugal won the toss and elected to bat.
- First ever WT20I match for Portugal.

== Records and statistics ==
International Match Summary — Portugal Women

Last updated 6 September 2026

Playing Record
Format	M	W	L	T	NR	Inaugural Match
Twenty20 Internationals	9	6	3	0	0	7 April 2025

T20I record versus other nations

Records complete to T20I #3005. Last updated 6 September 2026.

Opponent	M	W	L	T	NR	First match	First win
ICC Associate members
Belgium	3	3	0	0	0	4 September 2026	4 September 2026
Czech Republic	3	1	2	0	0	4 September 2026	6 September 2026
Norway	3	2	1	0	0	7 April 2025	7 April 2025

== See also ==
- List of Portugal women Twenty20 International cricketers
- Portugal national cricket team
