= Switzerland women's national cricket team =

Cricket team

Switzerland
- Flag of Switzerland
- Association: Cricket Switzerland

International Cricket Council
- ICC status: Associate member (2021); Affiliate member (1985)
- ICC region: Europe
ICC Rankings	Current	Best-ever
T20I	28th	28th (14-Sep-2025)

T20 Internationals
- First T20I: v. Belgium at Stars Arena, Hofstade; 28 May 2025
- Last T20I: v. Switzerland at Embrach Cricket Ground, Embrach; 31 July 2026
T20Is	Played	Won/Lost
Total	27	14/13 (0 ties, 0 no results)
This year	15	2/13 (0 ties, 0 no results)
- As of 31 July 2026

The Switzerland women's national cricket team represents the country of Switzerland in women's cricket matches.

In April 2018, the International Cricket Council (ICC) granted full Women's Twenty20 International (WT20I) status to all its members.

== History ==
Switzerland women's team played its first T20 international match against Belgium on 28 May 2025 at Stars Arena, Hofstade.

28 May 2025
10:00
Scorecard

Belgium; 99/6 (20 overs)	v	Switzerland; 100/3 (12.1 overs)
Veera Redkar 41 (60); Meghna Rajan 3/6 (4 overs)		Franziska Kuenburg 40 (31); Arussa Illahi 2/20 (4 overs)

Switzerland won by 7 wickets
Stars Arena, Hofstade
Umpires: Abdul Rahman (Mlt) and Adnan Razzaq (Bel)
Player of the match: Franziska Kuenburg (Sui)

- Belgium won the toss and elected to bat.
- First ever T20I match for Switzerland.

== Records and statistics ==
International Match Summary — Switzerland Women

Last updated 31 July 2026

Playing Record
Format	M	W	L	T	NR	Inaugural Match
Twenty20 Internationals	27	14	13	0	0	28 May 2025

=== Twenty20 International ===
T20I record versus other nations

Records complete to WT20I #2944. Last updated 31 July 2026.

Opponent	M	W	L	T	NR	First match	First win
ICC Associate members
Austria	1	1	0	0	0	13 September 2025	13 September 2025
Belgium	4	4	0	0	0	28 May 2025	28 May 2025
Brazil	1	0	1.	0	0	29 July 2026	
Denmark	4	1	3	0	0	27 June 2026	27 June 2026
Estonia	2	2	0	0	0	18 July 2025	18 July 2025
Finland	3	3	0	0	0	18 July 2025	18 July 2025
Germany	5	1	4.	0	0	10 July 2026	12 July 2026
Jersey	2	0	2	0	0	27 July 2026	
Luxembourg	2	2	0	0	0	12 September 2025	12 September 2025
Spain	3	0	3	0	0	28 July 2026	

== See also ==
- List of Switzerland women Twenty20 International cricketers
