= Estonia women's national cricket team =

Estonia
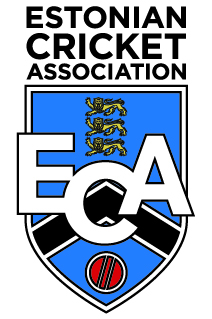
- Estonian Cricket Association logo
- Association: Estonian Cricket Association

International Cricket Council
- ICC status: Associate member (2017); Affiliate member (2008)
- ICC region: Europe
ICC Rankings	Current	Best-ever
T20I	58th	58th (1 Jan 2026)

T20 Internationals
- First T20I: v. Norway at Tikkurila Cricket Ground, Vantaa; 26 August 2023
- Last T20I: v. Finland at Estonian National Cricket and Rugby Field, Tallinn; 25 July 2026
T20Is	Played	Won/Lost
Total	28	8/19 (0 ties, 1 no result)
This year	2	0/2 (0 ties, 0 no results)
T20I kit
- As of 25 July 2026

The Estonia women's national cricket team represents the country of Estonia in women's cricket matches. The team is organised by the Estonian Cricket Association, an associate member of the International Cricket Council (ICC).

In April 2018, the International Cricket Council (ICC) granted full Women's Twenty20 International (WT20I) status to all its members. Therefore, all Twenty20 matches played between Estonia women and other ICC members since 1 July 2018 have the full WT20I status.

== History ==
Sometime in 2012, Finland visited Estonia for a cricket tour. The venue for this cricket trip was Tallinn, Estonia.

In July 2012, Estonia played in a T20 European Tournament at Sportpark Maarschalkerweerd in Utrecht against Belgium, Germany, Gibraltar, Jersey, and a Netherlands Invitation XI side. Jersey defeated Germany in the final.

In August 2013, Estonia participated in a five-team tournament in Bologna (along with Denmark, Gibraltar, Italy and Belgium), with Italy winning the tournament.

On the 26 August 2023, the side played its first T20I, as part of the Women's Nordic Cup, losing to Norway by 9 wickets. Later that year they played a 4 match ECI (T10) series in Malta, losing the series 0 – 4.

The Malta Women's Cricket team travelled to Estonia for a 5 match ECI (T10) series, broadcast on the European Cricket Network, Estonia won the series 4 – 1.

On the 20th and 21 April 2024, Estonia visited Gibrlatar and played a 3 match T20i series, they lost all 3 games.

In June 2024 they went to Cyprus to play a 5 game ECI (T10) series and 6 T20i's. Cyprus won the ECI's 4 – 1 and the T20i's 4 – 0. A match was abandoned due to a dangerous pitch.

== Players ==
The current squad is:

- Maret Valner – All Rounder
- Liina Sõrmus – All Rounder
- Laima Dalbina – All Rounder
- Vikroria Frey – All Rounder
- Ragne Hallik – Batter
- Beenish Wani – All Rounder
- Natalia Tykhonravova – Batter
- Sirli Pattenden – Bowler
- Milvi Pugi – Bowler
- Svetla Gocheva – Batter
- Asma Shifa – Wicket Keeper
- Mirjam Frey – Batter
- Amy Pattenden – Bowler
- Natallia Zholudz – Batter
- Egelin Ellermaa – Batter
- Helena Kerge – Batter
- Annemari Vessik – All Rounder

== Staff ==
- Head Coach – Terry O'Connor
- Manager – Medha Gooch
- Assistant Coach – Georgina Sockett
- Strength and Conditioning Coach – Chris Wallace

== Records and statistics ==
International Match Summary — Estonia Women

Last updated 25 July 2026

Playing Record
Format	M	W	L	T	NR	Inaugural match
Twenty20 Internationals	28	8	19	0	1	26 August 2023

=== Twenty20 International ===
- Highest team total: 132/4 v Switzerland on 18 July 2025 at Kerava National Cricket Ground, Kerava.
- Highest individual score: 49*, Viktoria Frey v Switzerland on 18 July 2025 at Kerava National Cricket Ground, Kerava.
- Best individual bowling figures: 5/12, Annemari Vessik v Norway on 10 August 2024 at Ekeberg Cricket Ground 1, Oslo, Norway.

T20I record versus other nations

Records complete to WT20I #2925. Last updated 25 July 2026.

Opponent	M	W	L	T	NR	First match	First win
ICC Associate members
Bulgaria	3	3	0	0	0	15 May 2025	15 May 2025
Cyprus	6	0	5	0	1	17 June 2024	
Czech Republic	3	3	0	0	0	6 September 2025	6 September 2025
Denmark	1	0	1	0	0	11 August 2024	
Finland	4	1	3	0	0	19 July 2025	20 July 2025
Gibraltar	6	1	5	0	0	20 April 2024	2 August 2025
Guernsey	1	0	1	0	0	10 August 2024	
Norway	2	0	2	0	0	26 August 2023	
Switzerland	2	0	2	0	0	18 July 2025	

== See also ==
- Estonia national cricket team
- List of Estonia women Twenty20 International cricketers
