= Sződliget =

- Flag Coat of arms

- Location of Sződliget in Hungary
- Coordinates: 47°43′48.43″N 19°8′45.74″E
- Country: Hungary
- Region: Central Hungary
- County: Pest
- Subregion: Váci
- Rank: Village

Area
  - Total: 7.29 km^{2} (2.81 sq mi)
- Time zone: UTC+1 (CET)
  - Summer (DST): UTC+2 (CEST)
- Postal code: 2133
- Area code: +36 27
- Website: www.szodliget.hu

Sződliget is a small town in Pest county, Hungary.

Sződliget has around 4500 inhabitants and is situated on the east bank of the Danube surrounded by agricultural land. Sződliget acts as a commuter town for Budapest (27 km to the south), and to some extent for Vác (7 km to the north) with good train and road links to both. It is also home to some small businesses and farming families. There has been a shift in demographic since the 1980s when there were older and less mobile residents - now the village is seeing more families with children staying and a sense of community is more evident. A new cycling path, also suitable for walkers, passes along the Danube bank at Sződliget, linking Dunakeszi to Vác. Flooding has occasionally affected low-lying land in the village. Sződliget faces an uninhabited part of the Szentendre Island across a 90m stretch of the Danube.

== Cricket at Sződliget ==
In 2009, the Hungarian Cricket Association (HCA) identified the playing fields of the lapsed Sződliget football club 25 km north of Budapest as a potential site for the building of Hungary's first full-sized cricket ground. The land was bought privately and, after one or two false starts, landscaping and the building of a pavilion were started in autumn 2010. The pitch was initially the home ground of the now lapsed Spartans CC.

An artificial wicket was installed and the landscaping was completed in June 2011. Around 30 matches were played at Sződliget in its first season, culminating in the EuroTwenty20 tournament week in mid August 2011. That tournament saw the Hungarian Senior Men's XI defend their title by beating Bulgaria in the final of an eight team knock-out cup. League and cup double-winners in 2011 were the Budapest Falcons CC.

Matches are usually played at Sződliget on Saturdays and Sundays between mid-April and late September.

The cricket pitch's boundary is 73m at its longest (from centre to boundary) and 63m at its shortest, making it one of Central Europe's largest cricket pitches. Mowing the whole pitch involves a journey of around 19 km on the tractor-mower.

2012 saw many cricket matches played at Sződliget's GB Oval pitch, either top league games, international friendlies or other fixtures and training sessions. Very few local people come to watch matches, which is a pity since matches are free to watch, are often tense but good-humoured and the cricketing fraternity would be only too happy to try to explain the game to any visitor (who has the requisite time, patience and language skills).

In autumn 2012 and spring 2013, surface repairs were made to several worn-out areas of the pitch. Despite late snow and plenty of rain, matches organised by the HCA resumed at the ground in April 2013. The season saw 20-25 league and cup matches on Saturdays and Sundays, including matches for juniors and women's teams, as well as various training sessions and some tour matches and international friendly matches played at Sződliget. The HCA warmly invites all visitors to come and watch matches free of charge. The highlight of the 2013 Sződliget season was arguably the triangular International Cricket weekend on September 28/29, which saw decent matches between Hungary, Poland and Croatia. Domestic Cup winners 2013 were the Falcons and 40-over winners were the Tigers.

Flooding in June 2013 *** The whole cricket pitch was under Danube flood-water for 11 days in early June 2013, the field only being 3.5m above the usual level of the river, which is 1500m to the west. 80% of the grass was lost. Matches continued on the damaged but playable surface from July 12, 2013 onwards. Re-seeding started in late October and will be completed in March/April 2014.

=== Naturewatch at the GB Oval ===
On the south side of the pitch there is a drainage stream. There, and elsewhere at the cricket pitch's borders, the following wildlife has been seen: kingfishers, buzzards, herons, lapwings, egrets, sticklebacks and other small fish, common frogs, toads, fresh-water shrimps up to 12 cm long, "Sikló" non-venomous water snakes, grass-snakes, ducks, wagtails, ravens and jackdaws, both common woodpeckers, finches, pheasants, bees, voles, foxes, several species of butterfly, various cycadas, dragonflies, much insect life, spiders, grey squirrels, wild mint, thyme, orchids, rushes, laurel and perhaps an eagle - moles are less welcome but are also in residence. (running total: 36)
