= List of Estonia women Twenty20 International cricketers =

This is a list of Estonian women Twenty20 International cricketers. A Twenty20 International (T20I) is an international cricket match between two representative teams. A Twenty20 International is played under the rules of Twenty20 cricket. In April 2018, the International Cricket Council (ICC) granted full international status to Twenty20 women's matches played between member sides from 1 July 2018 onwards.

The list is arranged in the order in which each player won her first Twenty20 cap. Where more than one player won her first Twenty20 cap in the same match, those players are listed alphabetically by surname.

== Key ==
General

- ‡ – Captain
- † – Wicket-keeper
- First – Year of debut
- Last – Year of latest game
- Mat – Number of matches played

Batting

- Runs – Runs scored in career
- HS – Highest score
- Avg – Runs scored per dismissal
- * – Batsman remained not out
- 50 – Number of half centuries

Bowling

- Balls – Balls bowled in career
- Wkt – Wickets taken in career
- BBI – Best bowling in an innings
- Ave – Average runs per wicket

Fielding

- Ca – Catches taken
- St – Stumpings affected

== List of players ==
Statistics are correct as of 25 July 2026.

Estonia women T20I cricketers
General					Batting				Bowling				Fielding		Ref
No.	Name	First	Last	Mat	Runs	HS	Avg	50	Balls	Wkt	BBI	Ave	Ca	St	Ref
1	Asma Shifa†	2023	2025	15	28	12	3.11	0	–	–	–	–	4	1	
2	Laima Dalbina	2023	2024	10	66	26	13.20	0	191	3	1/12	69.00	1	0	
3	Viktoria Frey	2023	2025	26	250	49*	11.90	0	471	25	5/13	20.56	0	0	
4	Svetla Gocheva	2023	2023	1	0	0	0.00	0	–	–	–	–	0	0	
5	Janika Horn‡	2023	2023	1	1	1*	–	0	12	0	–	–	0	0	
6	Sirli Pattenden	2023	2026	19	7	2*	1.16	0	115	2	2/17	82.50	3	0	
7	Milvi Pugi	2023	2024	2	1	1	0.50	0	–	–	–	–	0	0	
8	Ragne Hallik†	2023	2025	15	102	32	8.50	0	174	7	2/3	2,814	0	0	
9	Liina Sormus	2023	2025	25	103	20*	5.72	0	240	8	2/21	32.50	4	0	
10	Natalia Tykhonravova†	2023	2025	14	29	9	2.63	0	–	–	–	–	2	1	
11	Maret Valner‡	2023	2026	28	77	12	4.05	0	552	31	4/10	14.67	7	0	
12	Mirjam Frey	2024	2025	14	30	14	3.33	0	–	–	–	–	1	0	
13	Helena Kerge†	2024	2026	26	74	22	4.62	0	–	–	–	–	4	0	
14	Beenish Wani	2024	2025	12	53	18	5.88	0	54	1	1/29	72.00	3	0	
15	Natalia Zholudz	2024	2024	12	36	12	3.27	0	–	–	–	–	0	0	
16	Egelin Ellermaa	2024	2026	23	27	5	2.07	0	–	–	–	–	3	0	
17	Annemari Vessik‡	2024	2026	24	181	40	9.52	0	474	20	5/12	18.40	4	0	
18	Amy Pattenden	2024	2024	2	1	1	1.00	–	12	0	–	–	0	0	
19	Chamali Lokuge	2025	2026	15	119	23	9.15	0	241	13	4/10	16.84	6	0	
20	Geethma Madanayake	2025	2026	15	129	21	8.60	0	229	10	3/26	21.50	2	0	
21	Angelis Heidov	2025	2025	1	–	–	–	–	–	–	–	–	1	0	
22	Aryaa Kulkarni	2026	2026	2	0	0	0.00	0	21	1	1/10	22.00	0	0	
23	Kadri Just	2026	2026	1	0	0	0.00	0	–	–	–	–	0	0	
24	Laura-Anette Taei	2026	2026	2	2	2*	–	0	–	–	–	–	0	0	
25	Nisha Kulkarni	2026	2026	1	0	0*	–	0	–	–	–	–	0	0	
