= Santarem Cricket Ground =

Cricket ground

- Interactive map of Santarem Cricket Ground

Ground information
- Location: Gucherre, Santarém, Portugal
- Country: Portugal
- Coordinates: 39°14′0.7″N 8°50′55.5″W
- Establishment: 2021

International information
- First men's T20I: 19 August 2021: Portugal v Malta
- Last men's T20I: 9 April 2025: Portugal v Norway
- First women's T20I: 7 April 2025: Portugal v Norway
- Last women's T20I: 9 April 2025: Portugal v Norway
- As of 9 April 2025; Source: ESPNcricinfo

The Santarem Cricket Ground, also known as the Gucherre Cricket Ground, is a cricket ground located in Gucherre, close to the city of Santarém in Portugal.

In August 2021, the ground was the venue for the first ever Twenty20 International (T20I) matches to be held in Portugal, when the Portugal men's team hosted a tri-nation series against Malta and Gibraltar from 19 to 22 August 2021. These were the first official T20I matches to be played in Portugal since the International Cricket Council (ICC) granted full T20I status to all competitive matches between its members from 1 January 2019.
