= Belgium women's national cricket team =

Belgium
- Association: Belgian Cricket Federation

International Cricket Council
- ICC status: Associate member (2005); Affiliate member (1991)
- ICC region: Europe
ICC Rankings	Current	Best-ever
T20I	---	44th (6 Feb 2019)

T20 Internationals
- First T20I: v. Austria at Seebarn Cricket Ground, Lower Austria; 25 September 2021
- Last T20I: v. Portugal at Vinoř Cricket Ground, Prague; 6 September 2026
T20Is	Played	Won/Lost
Total	20	1/19 (0 ties, 0 no results)
This year	9	1/8 (0 ties, 0 no results)
- As of 6 September 2026

The Belgium women's national cricket team represents Belgium in women's cricket matches. It is governed by the Belgian Cricket Federation and takes part in international cricket competitions.

== History ==
In 2011 Belgium hosted a four-team tournament also featuring Germany, Hungary and Netherlands. The following year it participated in the European Women's Cricket Festival in Utrecht, Netherlands.

In 2013 Belgium participated in a five-team tournament in Bologna that also featured Italy, Denmark, Estonia and Gibraltar.

In April 2018, the International Cricket Council (ICC) granted full Women's Twenty20 International (WT20I) status to all its members. Therefore, all Twenty20 matches played between Belgium women and other ICC members after 1 July 2018 are eligible to have full WT20I status.

== Records and statistics ==
International Match Summary — Belgium Women

Last updated 6 September 2026

Playing Record
Format	M	W	L	T	NR	Inaugural Match
Twenty20 Internationals	20	1	19	0	0	25 September 2021

=== Twenty20 International ===
T20I record versus other nations

Records complete to WT20I #3003. Last updated 6 September 2026.

Opponent	M	W	L	T	NR	First match	First win
ICC Associate members
Austria	3	0	3	0	0	25 September 2021	
Czech Republic	2	0	2	0	0	4 September 2026	
Luxembourg	8	1	7	0	0	19 May 2024	22 August 2026
Portugal	3	0	3	0	0	4 September 2026	
Switzerland	4	0	4	0	0	28 May 2025	

== See also ==
- EUT20 Belgium
- List of Belgium women Twenty20 International cricketers
