= Hofstade (East Flanders) =

Village in Belgium

Coordinates: 50°57′40″N 4°02′00″E

Coat of Arms of Hofstade

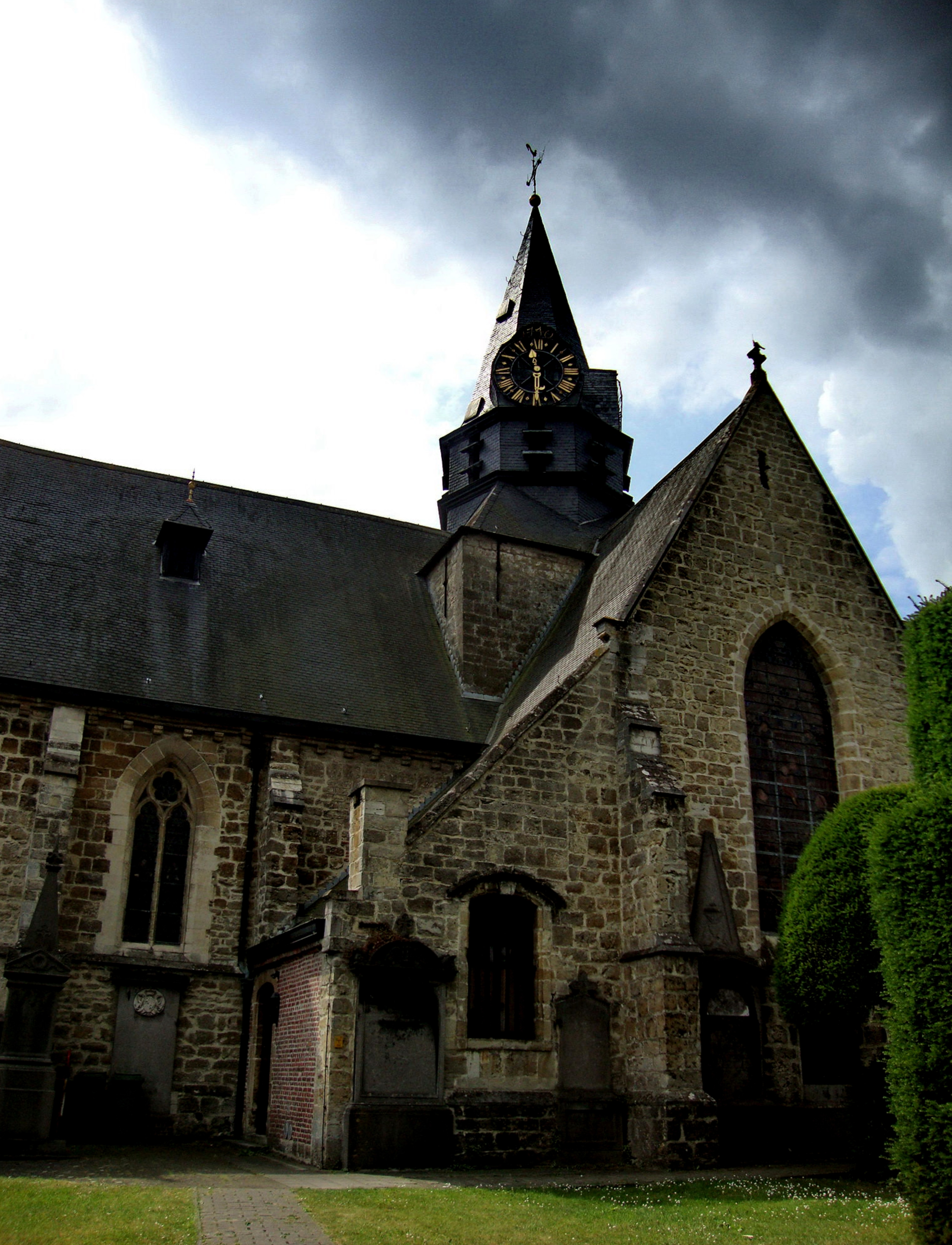
Church of Hofstade

Hofstade is a village in the Belgian province of East Flanders and is a submunicipality of Aalst. It was an independent municipality until the municipal reorganization of 1977. Hofstade is located in the Denderstreek north of Aalst. The total area is 660 ha, and the number of inhabitants is over 5000. In Hofstade the Molenbeek-Ter Erpenbeek flows into the Dender.

== History ==
The foundations of a Roman building and pottery were found in Hofstade, dating from 70–100 BC. Hofstade was first mentioned in 1069, when Forest Abbey had many possessions here. The Lords of Hofstade had a lordship that later became the personal property of the Count of Flanders and in 1630 went to the Baron of Lede, Willem Bette.
