= Associate international cricket in 2026 =

International cricket season

The 2026 Associate international cricket season includes series starting from approximately April to September 2026. All official 20-over matches between associate members of the ICC are eligible to have full men's Twenty20 International or women's Twenty20 International (T20I) status, as the International Cricket Council (ICC) granted T20I status to matches between all of its members from 1 July 2018 (women's teams) and 1 January 2019 (men's teams). The season includes all T20I cricket series mostly involving ICC Associate members, that are played in addition to series covered in International cricket in 2026.

In June 2026, the International Cricket Council (ICC) updated the Classification of Official Cricket regulations, confirming that teams competing in the 2024–2026 Cricket World Cup Challenge League framework will be eligible to play other sanctioned, non-tournament 50-over games with official List A status during their competition cycle.

== Season overview ==
=== Men's events ===
International tours
| Start date | Home team | Away team | Results [Matches] |
| Start date | Home team | Away team | T20I |
|---|---|---|---|
| 7 April 2026 | Indonesia | Sweden | 1–7 [8] |
| 15 April 2026 | Namibia | Scotland | 1–2 [3] |
| 20 April 2026 | Nepal | United Arab Emirates | 1–1 [2] |
| 1 May 2026 | Malaysia | Indonesia | 4–0 [4] |
| 1 May 2026 | Germany | Austria | 4–1 [5] |
| 2 May 2026 | Guernsey | Isle of Man | 2–0 [3] |
| 7 May 2026 | Malta | Gibraltar | 5–1 [6] |
| 8 May 2026 | Cyprus | Finland | 1–3 [4] |
| 8 May 2026 | Romania | Bulgaria | 4–0 [5] |
| 18 June 2026 | Denmark | Germany | 3–1 [4] |
| 27 June 2026 | Hungary | Austria | 0–3 [3] |
| 1 July 2026 | Sweden | Portugal | 0–3 [3] |
| 3 July 2026 | Finland | Portugal | 0–2 [5] |
| 31 July 2026 | Kenya | Bahrain | 1–1 [2] |
| 11 August 2026 | Finland | Germany | 0–1 [1] |
| 14 September 2026 | Malaysia | United Arab Emirates | 0–3 [3] |
| 19 September 2026 | Japan | Hong Kong | 0–1 [2] |
International tournaments
| Start date | Tournament | | Winners |
| 2 April 2026 | (Mexico) 2026 Men's Central American Championship | | Brazil |
| 5 April 2026 | 2026 Portugal Tri-Nation Series | | Portugal |
| 8 May 2026 | (Japan) 2026 Men's T20 World Cup East Asia-Pacific Sub-regional Qualifier | | Papua New Guinea |
| 16 May 2026 | (Cyprus) 2026 Men's T20 World Cup Europe Sub-regional Qualifier A | | Jersey |
| 23 May 2026 | (Botswana) 2026 Men's T20 World Cup Africa Sub-regional Qualifier A | | Rwanda |
| 31 May 2026 | (Singapore) 2026 Asian Games Men's Qualifier | | Nepal |
| 2 June 2026 | (Eswatini) 2026 Ubuntu Tri-Nation Series | | Eswatini |
| 10 June 2026 | (Singapore) 2026 ACC Men's Challenger Cup | | Malaysia |
| 11 June 2026 | (Sweden) 2026 Viking Cup | | Sweden |
| 18 June 2026 | 2026 Namibia Tri-Nation Series | | Namibia |
| 19 June 2026 | (Romania) 2026 Men's Continental Cup | | Belgium |
| 21 June 2026 | (Bermuda) 2026 Men's T20 World Cup Americas Sub-regional Qualifier A | | Bermuda |
| 22 June 2026 | (Singapore) 2026 Asia Pacific Cricket Champions Trophy | | Singapore |
| 26 June 2026 | (Czech Republic) 2026 Men's Central Europe Cup | | Czech Republic |
| 8 July 2026 | (Denmark) 2026 Men's T20 World Cup Europe Sub-regional Qualifier B | | Denmark |
| 25 July 2026 | (Romania) 2026 ECA Men's European Cup | | France |
| 6 August 2026 | (Colombia) 2026 Men's South American Championship | | Brazil |
| 11 August 2026 | 2026 Malawi Tri-Nation Series | | Rwanda |
| 14 August 2026 | (Finland) 2026 Men's T20 World Cup Europe Sub-regional Qualifier C | | Portugal |
| 8 September 2026 | (Rwanda) 2026 Africa Continental Cup | | Kenya |
| 21 September 2026 | 2026 Nigeria Quadrangular Series | | Nigeria A |
| 23 September 2026 | (Cayman Islands) 2026 North American Cup | | Bermuda |

=== Women's events ===
International tours
| Start date | Home team | Away team | Results [Matches] |
| Start date | Home team | Away team | T20I |
|---|---|---|---|
| 3 April 2026 | Cyprus | Greece | 4–1 [6] |
| 24 April 2026 | Costa Rica | Chile | 3–0 [3] |
| 9 May 2026 | Greece | Denmark | 1–3 [4] |
| 15 May 2026 | Malaysia | Indonesia | 0–2 [2] |
| 20 May 2026 | Malaysia | Nepal | 0–2 [2] |
| 29 May 2026 | (Malaysia) Bahrain | Oman | 0–2 [2] |
| 30 May 2026 | (Malaysia) Kuwait | Myanmar | 1–1 [2] |
| 14 June 2026 | Jersey | Guernsey | 2–0 [2] |
| 18 June 2026 | Cyprus | Malta | 5–0 [5] |
| 26 June 2026 | Bulgaria | Serbia | 1–3 [4] |
| 27 June 2026 | Denmark | Switzerland | 3–1 [4] |
| 10 July 2026 | Germany | Switzerland | 4–1 [5] |
| 25 July 2026 | Estonia | Finland | 0–2 [2] |
| 29 July 2026 | Switzerland | Jersey | 0–1 [1] |
| 29 July 2026 | Argentina | Canada | 5–1 [7] |
| 31 July 2026 | Switzerland | Spain | 0–1 [1] |
| 22 August 2026 | Luxembourg | Belgium | 3–1 [4] |
| 11 September 2026 | Japan | Malaysia | 1–1 [3] |
International tournaments
| Start date | Tournament | | Winners |
| 6 April 2026 | (Botswana) 2026 Kalahari Women's Tournament | | Brazil |
| 18 April 2026 | (Rwanda) 2026 Women's Challenge Trophy | | United States |
| 7 May 2026 | 2026 Hong Kong Women's Tri-Nation Series | | Hong Kong |
| 26 May 2026 | (Malaysia) 2026 Asian Games Women's Qualifier | | Thailand |
| 3 June 2026 | (Malaysia) 2026 ACC Women's Premier Cup | | Thailand |
| 10 June 2026 | (Rwanda) 2026 Kwibuka Women's T20 Tournament | | Zimbabwe XI |
| 26 June 2026 | (Czech Republic) 2026 Women's Central Europe Cup | | Czech Republic |
| 21 July 2026 | (Namibia) 2026 Capricorn Women's Quadrangular Series | | Uganda |
| 27 July 2026 | 2026 Switzerland Women's Quadrangular Series | | Brazil |
| 20 August 2026 | (China) 2026 Women's Belt and Road Trophy | | China |
| 26 August 2026 | (Romania) 2026 Women's Continental Cup | | Turkey |
| 28 August 2026 | (Germany) 2026 Women's Nordic Cup | | Sweden |
| 4 September 2026 | (Czech Republic) 2026 Falling Wickets Cup | | Portugal |
| 4 September 2026 | (Serbia) 2026 Balkan Cup | | Croatia |
| 23 September 2026 | (Brazil) 2026 Women's South American Championship | | Brazil A |

== April ==
=== 2026 Men's Central American Championship ===
| Pos | Team | Pld | W | L | NR | Pts | NRR |
|---|---|---|---|---|---|---|---|
| 1 | Mexico | 4 | 4 | 0 | 0 | 8 | 3.623 |
| 2 | Brazil | 4 | 2 | 2 | 0 | 4 | 1.699 |
| 3 | Costa Rica | 4 | 0 | 4 | 0 | 0 | −5.712 |

Source: Cricinfo

Round-robin
| No. | Date | Team 1 | Team 2 | Venue | Result |
|---|---|---|---|---|---|
| T20I 3793 | 2 April | Mexico | Brazil | Reforma Athletic Club, Naucalpan | Mexico by 23 runs |
| T20I 3794 | 2 April | Mexico | Costa Rica | Reforma Athletic Club, Naucalpan | Mexico by 124 runs |
| T20I 3795 | 3 April | Brazil | Costa Rica | Reforma Athletic Club, Naucalpan | Brazil by 10 wickets |
| T20I 3796 | 3 April | Mexico | Brazil | Reforma Athletic Club, Naucalpan | Mexico by 16 runs |
| T20I 3797 | 4 April | Brazil | Costa Rica | Reforma Athletic Club, Naucalpan | Brazil by 69 runs |
| T20I 3798 | 4 April | Mexico | Costa Rica | Reforma Athletic Club, Naucalpan | Mexico by 8 wickets |
Final
| T20I 3801 | 5 April | Mexico | Brazil | Reforma Athletic Club, Naucalpan | Brazil by 7 wickets |

=== Greece women in Cyprus ===
Aphrodite Cup (WT20I series)
| No. | Date | Venue | Result |
|---|---|---|---|
| WT20I 2695 | 3 April | Happy Valley Ground 2, Episkopi | Cyprus by 8 runs |
| WT20I 2696 | 3 April | Happy Valley Ground 2, Episkopi | Cyprus by 15 runs |
| WT20I 2697 | 4 April | Happy Valley Ground 2, Episkopi | Cyprus by 34 runs |
| WT20I 2698 | 4 April | Happy Valley Ground 2, Episkopi | No result |
| WT20I 2699 | 5 April | Happy Valley Ground 2, Episkopi | Cyprus by 7 runs (DLS) |
| WT20I 2700 | 5 April | Happy Valley Ground 2, Episkopi | Greece by 8 wickets |

=== 2026 Portugal Tri-Nation Series ===
| Pos | Team | Pld | W | L | NR | Pts | NRR |
|---|---|---|---|---|---|---|---|
| 1 | Portugal | 6 | 4 | 1 | 1 | 9 | 1.846 |
| 2 | France | 6 | 3 | 3 | 0 | 6 | −0.411 |
| 3 | Norway | 6 | 1 | 4 | 1 | 3 | −1.135 |

Source: Cricinfo

Round-robin
| No. | Date | Team 1 | Team 2 | Venue | Result |
|---|---|---|---|---|---|
| T20I 3799 | 5 April | France | Norway | Santarem Cricket Ground, Santarém | Norway by 10 runs |
| T20I 3800 | 5 April | Portugal | France | Santarem Cricket Ground, Santarém | Portugal by 6 wickets |
| T20I 3802 | 6 April | Portugal | Norway | Santarem Cricket Ground, Santarém | Portugal by 12 runs |
| T20I 3803 | 6 April | Portugal | France | Santarem Cricket Ground, Santarém | Portugal by 28 runs (DLS) |
| T20I 3806 | 7 April | France | Norway | Santarem Cricket Ground, Santarém | France by 7 runs |
| T20I 3806a | 7 April | Portugal | Norway | Santarem Cricket Ground, Santarém | Match abandoned |
| T20I 3807 | 8 April | Portugal | France | Santarem Cricket Ground, Santarém | France by 2 wickets |
| T20I 3808 | 8 April | Portugal | Norway | Santarem Cricket Ground, Santarém | Portugal by 83 runs |
| T20I 3811 | 9 April | France | Norway | Santarem Cricket Ground, Santarém | France by 4 wickets |
Final
| T20I 3812 | 9 April | Portugal | France | Santarem Cricket Ground, Santarém | Portugal by 30 runs |

=== 2026 Kalahari Women's Tournament ===
On 9 April 2026, Brazil's Laura Cardoso set a record for the best bowling figures in a T20I when she took 9/4 against Lesotho. Cardoso took five wickets in consecutive deliveries.

| Pos | Team | Pld | W | L | NR | Pts | NRR |
|---|---|---|---|---|---|---|---|
| 1 | Brazil | 5 | 5 | 0 | 0 | 10 | 6.969 |
| 2 | Botswana | 5 | 3 | 2 | 0 | 6 | 2.360 |
| 3 | Mozambique | 5 | 3 | 2 | 0 | 6 | 1.152 |
| 4 | Malawi | 5 | 3 | 2 | 0 | 6 | −0.337 |
| 5 | Lesotho | 5 | 1 | 4 | 0 | 2 | −4.571 |
| 6 | Zambia | 5 | 0 | 5 | 0 | 0 | −6.681 |

Source: Cricinfo

Round-robin
| No. | Date | Team 1 | Team 2 | Venue | Result |
|---|---|---|---|---|---|
| WT20I 2701 | 6 April | Botswana | Brazil | Botswana Cricket Association Oval 1, Gaborone | Brazil by 83 runs |
| WT20I 2702 | 6 April | Lesotho | Malawi | Botswana Cricket Association Oval 2, Gaborone | Malawi by 9 wickets |
| WT20I 2703 | 6 April | Mozambique | Zambia | Botswana Cricket Association Oval 1, Gaborone | Mozambique by 144 runs |
| WT20I 2704 | 6 April | Botswana | Lesotho | Botswana Cricket Association Oval 2, Gaborone | Botswana by 161 runs |
| WT20I 2705 | 7 April | Brazil | Malawi | Botswana Cricket Association Oval 1, Gaborone | Brazil by 136 runs |
| WT20I 2706 | 7 April | Botswana | Mozambique | Botswana Cricket Association Oval 2, Gaborone | Mozambique by 23 runs |
| WT20I 2707 | 7 April | Lesotho | Zambia | Botswana Cricket Association Oval 1, Gaborone | Lesotho by 8 wickets |
| WT20I 2708 | 7 April | Brazil | Mozambique | Botswana Cricket Association Oval 2, Gaborone | Brazil by 9 wickets |
| WT20I 2709 | 8 April | Botswana | Malawi | Botswana Cricket Association Oval 1, Gaborone | Botswana by 23 runs |
| WT20I 2710 | 8 April | Brazil | Zambia | Botswana Cricket Association Oval 2, Gaborone | Brazil by 174 runs |
| WT20I 2711 | 8 April | Lesotho | Mozambique | Botswana Cricket Association Oval 1, Gaborone | Mozambique by 32 runs |
| WT20I 2712 | 8 April | Botswana | Zambia | Botswana Cricket Association Oval 2, Gaborone | Botswana by 158 runs |
| WT20I 2713 | 9 April | Malawi | Mozambique | Botswana Cricket Association Oval 1, Gaborone | Malawi by 7 wickets |
| WT20I 2714 | 9 April | Brazil | Lesotho | Botswana Cricket Association Oval 2, Gaborone | Brazil by 189 runs |
| WT20I 2715 | 9 April | Malawi | Zambia | Botswana Cricket Association Oval 1, Gaborone | Malawi by 5 wickets |

| Pos | Team | Pld | W | L | NR | Pts | NRR |
|---|---|---|---|---|---|---|---|
| 1 | Brazil | 2 | 2 | 0 | 0 | 4 | 4.882 |
| 2 | Botswana | 2 | 1 | 1 | 0 | 2 | 1.100 |
| 3 | Mozambique | 2 | 0 | 2 | 0 | 0 | −5.248 |

Source: Cricinfo

Super League
| No. | Date | Team 1 | Team 2 | Venue | Result |
|---|---|---|---|---|---|
| WT20I 2716 | 10 April | Botswana | Brazil | Botswana Cricket Association Oval 1, Gaborone | Brazil by 8 wickets |
| WT20I 2718 | 10 April | Brazil | Mozambique | Botswana Cricket Association Oval 1, Gaborone | Brazil by 9 wickets |
| WT20I 2720 | 11 April | Botswana | Mozambique | Botswana Cricket Association Oval 1, Gaborone | Botswana by 81 runs |

| Pos | Team | Pld | W | L | NR | Pts | NRR |
|---|---|---|---|---|---|---|---|
| 1 | Malawi | 2 | 2 | 0 | 0 | 4 | 2.793 |
| 2 | Lesotho | 2 | 1 | 1 | 0 | 2 | 0.164 |
| 3 | Zambia | 2 | 0 | 2 | 0 | 0 | −2.525 |

Source: Cricinfo

Plate League
| No. | Date | Team 1 | Team 2 | Venue | Result |
|---|---|---|---|---|---|
| WT20I 2717 | 10 April | Lesotho | Malawi | Botswana Cricket Association Oval 2, Gaborone | Malawi by 9 wickets |
| WT20I 2719 | 10 April | Malawi | Zambia | Botswana Cricket Association Oval 2, Gaborone | Malawi by 53 runs |
| WT20I 2721 | 11 April | Lesotho | Zambia | Botswana Cricket Association Oval 2, Gaborone | Lesotho by 48 runs |

Play-offs
| No. | Date | Team 1 | Team 2 | Venue | Result |
3rd Place play-off
| WT20I 2722 | 11 April | Malawi | Mozambique | Botswana Cricket Association Oval 2, Gaborone | Malawi by 1 wicket |
Final
| WT20I 2723 | 11 April | Botswana | Brazil | Botswana Cricket Association Oval 1, Gaborone | Brazil by 3 wickets |

=== Sweden in Indonesia ===
T20I series
| No. | Date | Venue | Result |
|---|---|---|---|
| T20I 3804 | 7 April | Udayana Cricket Ground, Jimbaran | Sweden by 4 wickets |
| T20I 3805 | 7 April | Udayana Cricket Ground, Jimbaran | Sweden by 4 wickets |
| T20I 3809 | 9 April | Udayana Cricket Ground, Jimbaran | Sweden by 5 wickets |
| T20I 3810 | 9 April | Udayana Cricket Ground, Jimbaran | Sweden by 10 runs |
| T20I 3813 | 11 April | Udayana Cricket Ground, Jimbaran | Sweden by 5 wickets |
| T20I 3814 | 11 April | Udayana Cricket Ground, Jimbaran | Sweden by 87 runs |
| T20I 3815 | 13 April | Udayana Cricket Ground, Jimbaran | Indonesia by 4 wickets |
| T20I 3816 | 13 April | Udayana Cricket Ground, Jimbaran | Sweden by 18 runs |

=== Scotland in Namibia ===
T20I series
| No. | Date | Venue | Result |
|---|---|---|---|
| T20I 3817 | 15 April | Namibia Cricket Ground, Windhoek | Scotland by 7 wickets |
| T20I 3818 | 17 April | Namibia Cricket Ground, Windhoek | Scotland by 19 runs |
| T20I 3819 | 18 April | Namibia Cricket Ground, Windhoek | Namibia by 4 wickets |

=== 2026 Women's Challenge Trophy ===
| Pos | Team | Pld | W | L | NR | Pts | NRR | Result |
|---|---|---|---|---|---|---|---|---|
| 1 | United States | 8 | 6 | 1 | 1 | 13 | 2.353 | Champions |
| 2 | Nepal | 8 | 5 | 3 | 0 | 10 | 0.615 | Runners-up |
| 3 | Rwanda | 8 | 4 | 3 | 1 | 9 | −0.048 | |
| 4 | Italy | 8 | 3 | 5 | 0 | 6 | −1.231 | |
| 5 | Vanuatu | 8 | 1 | 7 | 0 | 2 | −1.595 | |

Source: Cricinfo

Round-robin
| No. | Date | Team 1 | Team 2 | Venue | Result |
|---|---|---|---|---|---|
| WT20I 2725 | 18 April | Rwanda | Italy | Gahanga International Cricket Stadium, Kigali | Italy by 16 runs (DLS) |
| WT20I 2726 | 18 April | Nepal | United States | Gahanga International Cricket Stadium, Kigali | United States by 44 runs |
| WT20I 2727 | 19 April | Rwanda | Vanuatu | Gahanga B Ground, Kigali | Rwanda by 41 runs |
| WT20I 2728 | 19 April | Italy | Nepal | Gahanga B Ground, Kigali | Nepal by 50 runs |
| WT20I 2730 | 21 April | Rwanda | United States | Gahanga International Cricket Stadium, Kigali | Rwanda by 1 run |
| WT20I 2731 | 21 April | Italy | Vanuatu | Gahanga International Cricket Stadium, Kigali | Italy by 4 wickets |
| WT20I 2732 | 22 April | Rwanda | Nepal | Gahanga B Ground, Kigali | Nepal by 2 wickets |
| WT20I 2733 | 22 April | United States | Vanuatu | Gahanga B Ground, Kigali | United States by 53 runs |
| WT20I 2735 | 24 April | Nepal | Vanuatu | Gahanga International Cricket Stadium, Kigali | Vanuatu by 22 runs |
| WT20I 2736 | 24 April | Italy | United States | Gahanga International Cricket Stadium, Kigali | United States by 72 runs |
| WT20I 2740 | 26 April | Rwanda | Vanuatu | Gahanga B Ground, Kigali | Rwanda by 3 runs |
| WT20I 2741 | 26 April | Nepal | United States | Gahanga B Ground, Kigali | United States by 7 wickets |
| WT20I 2743 | 27 April | Rwanda | Italy | Gahanga International Cricket Stadium, Kigali | Rwanda by 6 wickets |
| WT20I 2744 | 27 April | United States | Vanuatu | Gahanga International Cricket Stadium, Kigali | United States by 72 runs |
| WT20I 2746 | 28 April | Rwanda | Nepal | Gahanga B Ground, Kigali | Nepal by 38 runs |
| WT20I 2748 | 28 April | Italy | Vanuatu | Gahanga B Ground, Kigali | Italy by 8 runs (DLS) |
| WT20I 2749 | 30 April | Italy | United States | Gahanga International Cricket Stadium, Kigali | United States by 9 wickets |
| WT20I 2751 | 30 April | Nepal | Vanuatu | Gahanga International Cricket Stadium, Kigali | Nepal by 83 runs |
| WT20I 2752 | 1 May | Rwanda | United States | Gahanga B Ground, Kigali | No result |
| WT20I 2753 | 1 May | Italy | Nepal | Gahanga B Ground, Kigali | Nepal by 8 wickets |

=== United Arab Emirates in Nepal ===
T20I series
| No. | Date | Venue | Result |
|---|---|---|---|
| T20I 3820 | 20 April | Tribhuvan University International Cricket Ground, Kirtipur | United Arab Emirates by 6 wickets (DLS) |
| T20I 3821 | 21 April | Tribhuvan University International Cricket Ground, Kirtipur | Nepal by 8 wickets |

=== Chile women in Costa Rica ===
Women's Central American Championship (WT20I series)
| No. | Date | Venue | Result |
|---|---|---|---|
| WT20I 2737 | 24 April | Los Reyes Polo Club, Guácima | Costa Rica by 8 wickets |
| WT20I 2738 | 25 April | Los Reyes Polo Club, Guácima | Costa Rica by 8 wickets |
| WT20I 2742 | 26 April | Los Reyes Polo Club, Guácima | Costa Rica by 9 wickets |

== May ==
=== Indonesia in Malaysia ===
T20I series
| No. | Date | Venue | Result |
|---|---|---|---|
| T20I 3823 | 1 May | Bayuemas Oval, Pandamaran | Malaysia by 6 wickets |
| T20I 3826 | 2 May | Bayuemas Oval, Pandamaran | Malaysia by 12 runs |
| T20I 3834 | 4 May | Bayuemas Oval, Pandamaran | Malaysia by 104 runs |
| T20I 3835 | 5 May | Bayuemas Oval, Pandamaran | Malaysia by 5 wickets |

=== Austria in Germany ===
T20I series
| No. | Date | Venue | Result |
|---|---|---|---|
| T20I 3824 | 1 May | Bayer Uerdingen Cricket Ground, Krefeld | Germany by 162 runs |
| T20I 3825 | 1 May | Bayer Uerdingen Cricket Ground, Krefeld | Germany by 4 wickets |
| T20I 3828 | 2 May | Bayer Uerdingen Cricket Ground, Krefeld | Austria by 7 wickets |
| T20I 3830 | 2 May | Bayer Uerdingen Cricket Ground, Krefeld | Germany by 43 runs (DLS) |
| T20I 3831 | 3 May | Bayer Uerdingen Cricket Ground, Krefeld | Germany by 5 wickets |

=== Isle of Man in Guernsey ===
T20I series
| No. | Date | Venue | Result |
|---|---|---|---|
| T20I 3829 | 2 May | King George V Sports Ground, Castel | Guernsey by 7 wickets |
| T20I 3832 | 3 May | King George V Sports Ground, Castel | Guernsey by 40 runs |
| T20I 3833 | 3 May | King George V Sports Ground, Castel | No result |

=== 2026 Hong Kong Women's Tri-Nation Series ===
| Pos | Team | Pld | W | L | NR | Pts | NRR |
|---|---|---|---|---|---|---|---|
| 1 | Hong Kong | 4 | 4 | 0 | 0 | 8 | 2.363 |
| 2 | Malaysia | 4 | 1 | 3 | 0 | 2 | −1.162 |
| 3 | China | 4 | 1 | 3 | 0 | 2 | −1.200 |

Source: Cricinfo

Round-robin
| No. | Date | Team 1 | Team 2 | Venue | Result |
|---|---|---|---|---|---|
| WT20I 2755 | 7 May | China | Malaysia | Mission Road Ground, Mong Kok | Malaysia by 26 runs |
| WT20I 2756 | 7 May | Hong Kong | Malaysia | Mission Road Ground, Mong Kok | Hong Kong by 31 runs |
| WT20I 2757 | 8 May | China | Malaysia | Mission Road Ground, Mong Kok | Match tied (China won S/O) |
| WT20I 2758 | 8 May | Hong Kong | China | Mission Road Ground, Mong Kok | Hong Kong by 9 runs |
| WT20I 2761 | 10 May | Hong Kong | Malaysia | Mission Road Ground, Mong Kok | Hong Kong by 88 runs |
| WT20I 2762 | 10 May | Hong Kong | China | Mission Road Ground, Mong Kok | Hong Kong by 61 runs |
Final
| WT20I 2765 | 11 May | Hong Kong | Malaysia | Mission Road Ground, Mong Kok | Hong Kong by 28 runs |

=== Gibraltar in Malta ===
T20I series
| No. | Date | Venue | Result |
|---|---|---|---|
| T20I 3836 | 7 May | Marsa Sports Club, Marsa | Malta by 50 runs |
| T20I 3837 | 7 May | Marsa Sports Club, Marsa | Malta by 65 runs |
| T20I 3841 | 8 May | Marsa Sports Club, Marsa | Malta by 7 wickets |
| T20I 3843 | 8 May | Marsa Sports Club, Marsa | Malta by 50 runs |
| T20I 3850 | 9 May | Marsa Sports Club, Marsa | Malta by 7 wickets |
| T20I 3853 | 9 May | Marsa Sports Club, Marsa | Match tied (Gibraltar won S/O) |

=== 2026 Men's T20 World Cup East Asia-Pacific Sub-regional Qualifier ===
Group 1 standings
| Pos | Team | Pld | W | L | NR | Pts | NRR | Qualification |
|---|---|---|---|---|---|---|---|---|
| 1 | Japan (H) | 2 | 2 | 0 | 0 | 4 | 3.113 | Advanced to the Super six |
| 2 | Vanuatu | 2 | 1 | 1 | 0 | 2 | 2.275 | Advanced to the Super six |
| 3 | Fiji | 2 | 0 | 2 | 0 | 0 | −5.932 | Eliminated |

Source: ESPNcricinfo
(H) Host

Group 2 standings
| Pos | Team | Pld | W | L | NR | Pts | NRR | Qualification |
|---|---|---|---|---|---|---|---|---|
| 1 | Samoa | 2 | 2 | 0 | 0 | 4 | 4.780 | Advanced to the Super six |
| 2 | Indonesia | 2 | 1 | 1 | 0 | 2 | −1.695 | Advanced to the Super six |
| 3 | Philippines | 2 | 0 | 2 | 0 | 0 | −2.675 | Eliminated |

Source: ESPNcricinfo

Group 3 standings
| Pos | Team | Pld | W | L | NR | Pts | NRR | Qualification |
|---|---|---|---|---|---|---|---|---|
| 1 | Papua New Guinea | 2 | 2 | 0 | 0 | 4 | 4.625 | Advanced to the Super six |
| 2 | Cook Islands | 2 | 1 | 1 | 0 | 2 | 1.995 | Advanced to the Super six |
| 3 | South Korea | 2 | 0 | 2 | 0 | 0 | −7.273 | Eliminated |

Source: ESPNcricinfo

Group stage
| No. | Date | Team 1 | Team 2 | Venue | Result |
|---|---|---|---|---|---|
| T20I 3838 | 8 May | Indonesia | Philippines | Sano International Cricket Ground, Sano | Indonesia by 11 runs |
| T20I 3839 | 8 May | Fiji | Vanuatu | Kōrogi Sports Park, Nisshin | Vanuatu by 121 runs |
| T20I 3840 | 8 May | Cook Islands | South Korea | Kōrogi Sports Park, Nisshin | Cook Islands by 9 wickets |
| T20I 3846 | 9 May | Indonesia | Samoa | Sano International Cricket Ground, Sano | Samoa by 9 wickets |
| T20I 3847 | 9 May | Japan | Vanuatu | Kōrogi Sports Park, Nisshin | Japan by 30 runs |
| T20I 3848 | 9 May | Papua New Guinea | South Korea | Kōrogi Sports Park, Nisshin | Papua New Guinea by 136 runs |
| T20I 3855 | 10 May | Philippines | Samoa | Sano International Cricket Ground, Sano | Samoa by 96 runs |
| T20I 3856 | 10 May | Japan | Fiji | Kōrogi Sports Park, Nisshin | Japan by 8 wickets |
| T20I 3857 | 10 May | Cook Islands | Papua New Guinea | Kōrogi Sports Park, Nisshin | Papua New Guinea by 49 runs |

Super six standings
| Pos | Team | Pld | W | L | NR | Pts | NRR | Qualification |
|---|---|---|---|---|---|---|---|---|
| 1 | Papua New Guinea | 5 | 4 | 1 | 0 | 8 | 2.110 | Advanced to the regional final |
| 2 | Japan (H) | 5 | 4 | 1 | 0 | 8 | 1.481 | Advanced to the regional final |
| 3 | Samoa | 5 | 3 | 2 | 0 | 6 | 1.117 | Advanced to the regional final |
| 4 | Cook Islands | 5 | 3 | 2 | 0 | 6 | −0.509 | Advanced to the regional final |
| 5 | Vanuatu | 5 | 1 | 4 | 0 | 2 | −2.553 | Eliminated |
| 6 | Indonesia | 5 | 0 | 5 | 0 | 0 | −2.139 | Eliminated |

Source: ESPNcricinfo
(H) Host

Super six
| No. | Date | Team 1 | Team 2 | Venue | Result |
|---|---|---|---|---|---|
| T20I 3859 | 12 May | Samoa | Vanuatu | Sano International Cricket Ground, Sano | Samoa by 9 wickets |
| T20I 3860 | 12 May | Japan | Indonesia | Sano International Cricket Ground, Sano | Japan by 41 runs |
| T20I 3862 | 13 May | Papua New Guinea | Samoa | Sano International Cricket Ground, Sano | Papua New Guinea by 2 wickets |
| T20I 3864 | 13 May | Cook Islands | Vanuatu | Sano International Cricket Ground, Sano | Cook Islands by 11 runs (DLS) |
| T20I 3865 | 14 May | Indonesia | Papua New Guinea | Sano International Cricket Ground, Sano | Papua New Guinea by 38 runs |
| T20I 3867 | 14 May | Japan | Cook Islands | Sano International Cricket Ground, Sano | Cook Islands by 3 wickets |
| T20I 3868 | 16 May | Indonesia | Vanuatu | Sano International Cricket Ground, Sano | Vanuatu by 1 run |
| T20I 3869 | 16 May | Japan | Samoa | Sano International Cricket Ground, Sano | Japan by 9 wickets |
| T20I 3875 | 17 May | Cook Islands | Indonesia | Sano International Cricket Ground, Sano | Cook Islands by 50 runs |
| T20I 3877 | 17 May | Papua New Guinea | Vanuatu | Sano International Cricket Ground, Sano | Papua New Guinea by 147 runs |
| T20I 3882 | 18 May | Cook Islands | Samoa | Sano International Cricket Ground, Sano | Samoa by 9 wickets |
| T20I 3883 | 18 May | Japan | Papua New Guinea | Sano International Cricket Ground, Sano | Japan by 26 runs |

| Pos | Team | Pld | W | L | NR | Pts | NRR |
|---|---|---|---|---|---|---|---|
| 1 | South Korea | 4 | 3 | 1 | 0 | 6 | 1.105 |
| 2 | Philippines | 4 | 3 | 1 | 0 | 6 | 0.319 |
| 3 | Fiji | 4 | 0 | 4 | 0 | 0 | −1.440 |

Source: ESPNcricinfo

Tri-nation series
| No. | Date | Team 1 | Team 2 | Venue | Result |
|---|---|---|---|---|---|
| T20I 3861 | 12 May | Philippines | South Korea | Sano International Cricket Ground 2, Sano | Philippines by 23 runs |
| T20I 3863 | 13 May | Fiji | South Korea | Sano International Cricket Ground 2, Sano | South Korea by 6 wickets |
| T20I 3866 | 14 May | Fiji | Philippines | Sano International Cricket Ground 2, Sano | Philippines by 4 wickets |
| T20I 3870 | 16 May | Philippines | South Korea | Sano International Cricket Ground 2, Sano | South Korea by 8 wickets |
| T20I 3876 | 17 May | Fiji | South Korea | Sano International Cricket Ground 2, Sano | South Korea by 7 wickets |
| T20I 3884 | 18 May | Fiji | Philippines | Sano International Cricket Ground 2, Sano | Philippines by 9 wickets |

=== Finland in Cyprus ===
T20I series
| No. | Date | Venue | Result |
|---|---|---|---|
| T20I 3842 | 8 May | Happy Valley Ground, Episkopi | Cyprus by 26 runs |
| T20I 3845 | 8 May | Happy Valley Ground, Episkopi | Finland by 7 wickets |
| T20I 3851 | 9 May | Happy Valley Ground, Episkopi | Finland by 138 runs |
| T20I 3854 | 9 May | Happy Valley Ground, Episkopi | Finland by 38 runs |

=== Bulgaria in Romania ===
T20I series
| No. | Date | Venue | Result |
|---|---|---|---|
| T20I 3844 | 8 May | Moara Vlasiei Cricket Ground, Ilfov County | Romania by 31 runs |
| T20I 3849 | 9 May | Moara Vlasiei Cricket Ground, Ilfov County | Romania by 38 runs |
| T20I 3852 | 9 May | Moara Vlasiei Cricket Ground, Ilfov County | Romania by 17 runs (DLS) |
| T20I 3857a | 10 May | Moara Vlasiei Cricket Ground, Ilfov County | Match abandoned |
| T20I 3858 | 10 May | Moara Vlasiei Cricket Ground, Ilfov County | Romania by 30 runs |

=== Denmark women in Greece ===
WT20I series
| No. | Date | Venue | Result |
|---|---|---|---|
| WT20I 2759 | 9 May | Marina Ground, Corfu | Greece by 3 runs |
| WT20I 2760 | 9 May | Marina Ground, Corfu | Denmark by 71 runs |
| WT20I 2763 | 10 May | Marina Ground, Corfu | Denmark by 7 wickets |
| WT20I 2764 | 10 May | Marina Ground, Corfu | Denmark by 7 wickets |

=== Indonesia women in Malaysia ===
WT20I series
| No. | Date | Venue | Result |
|---|---|---|---|
| WT20I 2768 | 15 May | Kolej Tuanku Ja'afar Cricket Oval, Mantin | Indonesia by 7 wickets |
| WT20I 2770 | 17 May | Kolej Tuanku Ja'afar Cricket Oval, Mantin | Indonesia by 38 runs |

=== 2026 Men's T20 World Cup Europe Sub-regional Qualifier A ===
Group A standings
| Pos | Team | Pld | W | L | NR | Pts | NRR | Qualification |
|---|---|---|---|---|---|---|---|---|
| 1 | Jersey | 4 | 4 | 0 | 0 | 8 | 4.352 | Advanced to the final |
| 2 | France | 4 | 3 | 1 | 0 | 6 | 1.537 | Advanced to the 3rd place play-off |
| 3 | Croatia | 4 | 2 | 2 | 0 | 4 | −2.100 | Advanced to the 5th place play-off |
| 4 | Switzerland | 4 | 1 | 3 | 0 | 2 | −1.333 | Advanced to the 7th place play-off |
| 5 | Cyprus (H) | 4 | 0 | 4 | 0 | 0 | −1.829 | Eliminated |

Source: ESPNcricinfo
(H) Host

Group B standings
| Pos | Team | Pld | W | L | NR | Pts | NRR | Qualification |
|---|---|---|---|---|---|---|---|---|
| 1 | Guernsey | 4 | 4 | 0 | 0 | 8 | 2.286 | Advanced to the final |
| 2 | Sweden | 4 | 2 | 2 | 0 | 4 | 0.422 | Advanced to the 3rd place play-off |
| 3 | Austria | 4 | 2 | 2 | 0 | 4 | 0.284 | Advanced to the 5th place play-off |
| 4 | Malta | 4 | 2 | 2 | 0 | 4 | −0.084 | Advanced to the 7th place play-off |
| 5 | Slovenia | 4 | 0 | 4 | 0 | 0 | −3.181 | Eliminated |

Source: ESPNcricinfo

Group stage
| No. | Date | Team 1 | Team 2 | Venue | Result |
|---|---|---|---|---|---|
| T20I 3871 | 16 May | Cyprus | France | Happy Valley Ground, Episkopi | France by 8 wickets |
| T20I 3872 | 16 May | Guernsey | Sweden | Happy Valley Ground 2, Episkopi | Guernsey by 12 runs |
| T20I 3873 | 16 May | Jersey | Switzerland | Happy Valley Ground, Episkopi | Jersey by 9 wickets |
| T20I 3874 | 16 May | Austria | Malta | Happy Valley Ground 2, Episkopi | Austria by 7 wickets |
| T20I 3878 | 17 May | Guernsey | Malta | Happy Valley Ground, Episkopi | Guernsey by 6 wickets |
| T20I 3879 | 17 May | Croatia | France | Happy Valley Ground 2, Episkopi | France by 82 runs |
| T20I 3880 | 17 May | Austria | Slovenia | Happy Valley Ground, Episkopi | Austria by 2 wickets |
| T20I 3881 | 17 May | Cyprus | Jersey | Happy Valley Ground 2, Episkopi | Jersey by 53 runs |
| T20I 3885 | 19 May | France | Jersey | Happy Valley Ground, Episkopi | Jersey by 8 wickets |
| T20I 3886 | 19 May | Slovenia | Sweden | Happy Valley Ground 2, Episkopi | Sweden by 7 wickets |
| T20I 3887 | 19 May | Croatia | Switzerland | Happy Valley Ground, Episkopi | Croatia by 17 runs |
| T20I 3888 | 19 May | Austria | Guernsey | Happy Valley Ground 2, Episkopi | Guernsey by 46 runs |
| T20I 3889 | 20 May | Guernsey | Slovenia | Happy Valley Ground, Episkopi | Guernsey by 4 wickets |
| T20I 3890 | 20 May | Cyprus | Switzerland | Happy Valley Ground 2, Episkopi | Switzerland by 25 runs |
| T20I 3891 | 20 May | Malta | Sweden | Happy Valley Ground, Episkopi | Malta by 6 wickets |
| T20I 3892 | 20 May | Croatia | Jersey | Happy Valley Ground 2, Episkopi | Jersey by 109 runs |
| T20I 3893 | 22 May | France | Switzerland | Happy Valley Ground, Episkopi | France by 8 runs |
| T20I 3894 | 22 May | Austria | Sweden | Happy Valley Ground 2, Episkopi | Sweden by 3 wickets |
| T20I 3895 | 22 May | Cyprus | Croatia | Happy Valley Ground, Episkopi | Croatia by 7 runs |
| T20I 3896 | 22 May | Malta | Slovenia | Happy Valley Ground 2, Episkopi | Malta by 9 wickets |
7th Place play-off
| T20I 3899 | 23 May | Malta | Switzerland | Happy Valley Ground 2, Episkopi | Switzerland by 3 wickets |
5th Place play-off
| T20I 3902 | 23 May | Austria | Croatia | Happy Valley Ground 2, Episkopi | Austria by 5 wickets |
3rd Place play-off
| T20I 3898 | 23 May | France | Sweden | Happy Valley Ground, Episkopi | Sweden by 6 wickets |
Final
| T20I 3903 | 23 May | Guernsey | Jersey | Happy Valley Ground, Episkopi | Jersey by 4 wickets |

=== Nepal women in Malaysia ===
WT20I series
| No. | Date | Venue | Result |
|---|---|---|---|
| WT20I 2771 | 20 May | Bayuemas Oval, Pandamaran | Nepal by 2 wickets |
| WT20I 2773 | 22 May | Bayuemas Oval, Pandamaran | Nepal by 7 wickets |

=== 2026 Men's T20 World Cup Africa Sub-regional Qualifier A ===
Qualifier A standings
| Pos | Team | Pld | W | L | NR | Pts | NRR | Qualification |
|---|---|---|---|---|---|---|---|---|
| 1 | Rwanda | 6 | 6 | 0 | 0 | 12 | 3.870 | Advanced to the regional final |
| 2 | Kenya | 6 | 5 | 1 | 0 | 10 | 4.828 | Advanced to the regional final |
| 3 | Botswana (H) | 6 | 4 | 2 | 0 | 8 | 3.785 | Eliminated |
| 4 | Cameroon | 6 | 3 | 3 | 0 | 6 | 0.904 | Eliminated |
| 5 | Sierra Leone | 6 | 2 | 4 | 0 | 4 | −0.377 | Eliminated |
| 6 | Mali | 6 | 1 | 5 | 0 | 2 | −4.817 | Eliminated |
| 7 | Ivory Coast | 6 | 0 | 6 | 0 | 0 | −9.065 | Eliminated |

Source: ESPNcricinfo
(H) Host

Group stage
| No. | Date | Team 1 | Team 2 | Venue | Result |
|---|---|---|---|---|---|
| T20I 3897 | 23 May | Cameroon | Rwanda | Botswana Cricket Association Oval 1, Gaborone | Rwanda by 7 wickets |
| T20I 3900 | 23 May | Botswana | Sierra Leone | Botswana Cricket Association Oval 1, Gaborone | Botswana by 70 runs |
| T20I 3901 | 23 May | Kenya | Mali | Botswana Cricket Association Oval 2, Gaborone | Kenya by 172 runs |
| T20I 3904 | 24 May | Ivory Coast | Rwanda | Botswana Cricket Association Oval 1, Gaborone | Rwanda by 271 runs |
| T20I 3905 | 24 May | Botswana | Mali | Botswana Cricket Association Oval 1, Gaborone | Botswana by 10 wickets |
| T20I 3906 | 24 May | Cameroon | Sierra Leone | Botswana Cricket Association Oval 2, Gaborone | Cameroon by 1 wicket |
| T20I 3907 | 25 May | Kenya | Rwanda | Botswana Cricket Association Oval 1, Gaborone | Rwanda by 2 wickets |
| T20I 3908 | 25 May | Botswana | Cameroon | Botswana Cricket Association Oval 2, Gaborone | Botswana by 71 runs |
| T20I 3909 | 25 May | Ivory Coast | Mali | Botswana Cricket Association Oval 2, Gaborone | Mali by 6 wickets |
| T20I 3910 | 26 May | Mali | Rwanda | Botswana Cricket Association Oval 2, Gaborone | Rwanda by 8 wickets |
| T20I 3911 | 26 May | Kenya | Sierra Leone | Botswana Cricket Association Oval 1, Gaborone | Kenya by 38 runs |
| T20I 3912 | 26 May | Cameroon | Ivory Coast | Botswana Cricket Association Oval 2, Gaborone | Cameroon by 153 runs |
| T20I 3913 | 28 May | Botswana | Ivory Coast | Botswana Cricket Association Oval 1, Gaborone | Botswana by 231 runs |
| T20I 3914 | 28 May | Rwanda | Sierra Leone | Botswana Cricket Association Oval 2, Gaborone | Rwanda by 8 wickets |
| T20I 3915 | 28 May | Cameroon | Kenya | Botswana Cricket Association Oval 1, Gaborone | Kenya by 10 wickets |
| T20I 3916 | 29 May | Cameroon | Mali | Botswana Cricket Association Oval 1, Gaborone | Cameroon by 90 runs |
| T20I 3917 | 29 May | Ivory Coast | Sierra Leone | Botswana Cricket Association Oval 2, Gaborone | Sierra Leone by 9 wickets |
| T20I 3918 | 29 May | Botswana | Kenya | Botswana Cricket Association Oval 2, Gaborone | Kenya by 62 runs |
| T20I 3919 | 30 May | Mali | Sierra Leone | Botswana Cricket Association Oval 1, Gaborone | Sierra Leone by 6 wickets |
| T20I 3920 | 30 May | Ivory Coast | Kenya | Botswana Cricket Association Oval 2, Gaborone | Kenya by 9 wickets |
| T20I 3921 | 30 May | Botswana | Rwanda | Botswana Cricket Association Oval 1, Gaborone | Rwanda by 2 runs |

=== 2026 Asian Games Women's Qualifier ===
| Pos | Team | Pld | W | L | NR | Pts | NRR | Qualification |
|---|---|---|---|---|---|---|---|---|
| 1 | Thailand | 2 | 2 | 0 | 0 | 4 | 3.771 | Advanced to semi-finals |
| 2 | Malaysia (H) | 2 | 1 | 1 | 0 | 2 | −0.113 | Advanced to semi-finals |
| 3 | Hong Kong | 2 | 0 | 2 | 0 | 0 | −3.075 | Eliminated |

Source: Cricinfo
(H) Host

| Pos | Team | Pld | W | L | NR | Pts | NRR | Qualification |
|---|---|---|---|---|---|---|---|---|
| 1 | Nepal | 2 | 2 | 0 | 0 | 4 | 0.576 | Advanced to semi-finals |
| 2 | China | 2 | 1 | 1 | 0 | 2 | −0.430 | Advanced to semi-finals |
| 3 | Indonesia | 2 | 0 | 2 | 0 | 0 | −0.133 | Eliminated |

Source: Cricinfo

Group stage
| No. | Date | Team 1 | Team 2 | Venue | Result |
|---|---|---|---|---|---|
| WT20I 2776 | 26 May | Hong Kong | Thailand | Bayuemas Oval, Pandamaran | Thailand by 89 runs |
| WT20I 2777 | 26 May | China | Indonesia | Bayuemas Oval, Pandamaran | China by 3 wickets |
| WT20I 2778 | 27 May | Malaysia | Thailand | Bayuemas Oval, Pandamaran | Thailand by 7 wickets |
| WT20I 2779 | 27 May | China | Nepal | Bayuemas Oval, Pandamaran | Nepal by 19 runs |
| WT20I 2780 | 28 May | Malaysia | Hong Kong | Bayuemas Oval, Pandamaran | Malaysia by 34 runs |
| WT20I 2781 | 28 May | Indonesia | Nepal | Bayuemas Oval, Pandamaran | Nepal by 4 wickets |
Semi-finals
| WT20I 2787 | 30 May | China | Thailand | Bayuemas Oval, Pandamaran | Thailand by 84 runs |
| WT20I 2790 | 30 May | Malaysia | Nepal | Bayuemas Oval, Pandamaran | Malaysia by 2 wickets |
3rd-place play-off
| WT20I 2793 | 31 May | China | Nepal | Bayuemas Oval, Pandamaran | China by 5 wickets (DLS) |
Final
| WT20I 2795 | 31 May | Malaysia | Thailand | Bayuemas Oval, Pandamaran | Thailand by 9 wickets |

=== Bahrain against Oman women in Malaysia ===
WT20I series
| No. | Date | Venue | Result |
|---|---|---|---|
| WT20I 2785 | 29 May | Selangor Turf Club, Kuala Lumpur | Oman by 9 wickets |
| WT20I 2788 | 30 May | Selangor Turf Club, Kuala Lumpur | Oman by 118 runs |

=== Kuwait against Myanmar women in Malaysia ===
WT20I series
| No. | Date | Venue | Result |
|---|---|---|---|
| WT20I 2789 | 30 May | UKM-YSD Cricket Oval, Bangi | Kuwait by 7 wickets |
| WT20I 2794 | 31 May | UKM-YSD Cricket Oval, Bangi | Myanmar by 20 runs |

=== 2026 Asian Games Men's Qualifier ===
| Pos | Team | Pld | W | L | NR | Pts | NRR | Qualification |
|---|---|---|---|---|---|---|---|---|
| 1 | Nepal | 2 | 2 | 0 | 0 | 4 | 9.700 | Advanced to semi-finals |
| 2 | Malaysia | 2 | 1 | 1 | 0 | 2 | −2.041 | Advanced to semi-finals |
| 3 | China | 2 | 0 | 2 | 0 | 0 | −9.899 | Eliminated |

Source: Cricinfo

| Pos | Team | Pld | W | L | NR | Pts | NRR | Qualification |
|---|---|---|---|---|---|---|---|---|
| 1 | Hong Kong | 3 | 3 | 0 | 0 | 6 | 6.260 | Advanced to semi-finals |
| 2 | Oman | 3 | 2 | 1 | 0 | 4 | −2.309 | Advanced to semi-finals |
| 3 | Bahrain | 3 | 1 | 2 | 0 | 2 | −1.011 | Eliminated |
| 4 | Singapore (H) | 3 | 0 | 3 | 0 | 0 | −2.738 | Eliminated |

Source: Cricinfo
(H) Host

Group stage
| No. | Date | Team 1 | Team 2 | Venue | Result |
|---|---|---|---|---|---|
| T20I 3922 | 31 May | China | Nepal | Singapore National Cricket Ground, Singapore | Nepal by 221 runs |
| T20I 3923 | 1 June | Singapore | Oman | Singapore National Cricket Ground, Singapore | Oman by 7 runs (DLS) |
| T20I 3924 | 1 June | Bahrain | Hong Kong | Singapore National Cricket Ground, Singapore | Hong Kong by 8 wickets |
| T20I 3925 | 2 June | China | Malaysia | Singapore National Cricket Ground, Singapore | Malaysia by 9 wickets |
| T20I 3928 | 3 June | Bahrain | Oman | Singapore National Cricket Ground, Singapore | Oman by 20 runs |
| T20I 3929 | 3 June | Singapore | Hong Kong | Singapore National Cricket Ground, Singapore | Hong Kong by 9 wickets |
| T20I 3932 | 4 June | Malaysia | Nepal | Singapore National Cricket Ground, Singapore | Nepal by 167 runs |
| T20I 3935 | 5 June | Singapore | Bahrain | Singapore National Cricket Ground, Singapore | Bahrain by 2 runs |
| T20I 3936 | 5 June | Hong Kong | Oman | Singapore National Cricket Ground, Singapore | Hong Kong by 154 runs |
Semi-finals
| T20I 3939 | 7 June | Nepal | Oman | Singapore National Cricket Ground, Singapore | Nepal by 8 wickets |
| T20I 3940 | 7 June | Hong Kong | Malaysia | Singapore National Cricket Ground, Singapore | Hong Kong by 6 wickets |
3rd place play-off
| T20I 3943 | 8 June | Malaysia | Oman | Singapore National Cricket Ground, Singapore | Malaysia by 8 wickets |
Final
| T20I 3944 | 8 June | Hong Kong | Nepal | Singapore National Cricket Ground, Singapore | Nepal by 19 runs (DLS) |

== June ==
=== 2026 Ubuntu Tri-Nation Series ===
| Pos | Team | Pld | W | L | NR | Pts | NRR |
|---|---|---|---|---|---|---|---|
| 1 | Eswatini | 6 | 4 | 2 | 0 | 8 | 1.575 |
| 2 | Mozambique | 6 | 4 | 2 | 0 | 8 | 1.572 |
| 3 | Lesotho | 6 | 1 | 5 | 0 | 2 | −3.125 |

Source: Cricinfo

Round-robin
| No. | Date | Team 1 | Team 2 | Venue | Result |
|---|---|---|---|---|---|
| T20I 3926 | 2 June | Eswatini | Mozambique | Malkerns Country Club Oval, Malkerns | Eswatini by 44 runs |
| T20I 3927 | 2 June | Lesotho | Mozambique | Malkerns Country Club Oval, Malkerns | Mozambique by 110 runs |
| T20I 3930 | 3 June | Eswatini | Lesotho | Malkerns Country Club Oval, Malkerns | Eswatini by 85 runs |
| T20I 3931 | 3 June | Eswatini | Mozambique | Malkerns Country Club Oval, Malkerns | Mozambique by 5 wickets |
| T20I 3933 | 4 June | Lesotho | Mozambique | Malkerns Country Club Oval, Malkerns | Mozambique by 22 runs |
| T20I 3934 | 4 June | Eswatini | Lesotho | Malkerns Country Club Oval, Malkerns | Eswatini by 7 wickets |
| T20I 3937 | 6 June | Eswatini | Mozambique | Malkerns Country Club Oval, Malkerns | Eswatini by 3 wickets |
| T20I 3938 | 6 June | Lesotho | Mozambique | Malkerns Country Club Oval, Malkerns | Mozambique by 49 runs |
| T20I 3941 | 7 June | Eswatini | Lesotho | Malkerns Country Club Oval, Malkerns | Lesotho by 18 runs |
Final
| T20I 3942 | 7 June | Eswatini | Mozambique | Malkerns Country Club Oval, Malkerns | Eswatini by 6 wickets |

=== 2026 ACC Women's Premier Cup ===
Group A standings
| Pos | Team | Pld | W | L | NR | Pts | NRR | Qualification |
|---|---|---|---|---|---|---|---|---|
| 1 | Thailand | 4 | 4 | 0 | 0 | 8 | 5.348 | Advanced to the knockout stage |
| 2 | Japan | 4 | 3 | 1 | 0 | 6 | 1.675 | Advanced to the knockout stage |
| 3 | Myanmar | 4 | 2 | 2 | 0 | 4 | 0.874 | Eliminated |
| 4 | Mongolia | 4 | 1 | 3 | 0 | 2 | −3.968 | Eliminated |
| 5 | Bahrain | 4 | 0 | 4 | 0 | 0 | −3.141 | Eliminated |

Source: ESPNcricinfo

Group C standings
| Pos | Team | Pld | W | L | NR | Pts | NRR | Qualification |
|---|---|---|---|---|---|---|---|---|
| 1 | Indonesia | 3 | 3 | 0 | 0 | 6 | 2.315 | Advanced to the knockout stage |
| 2 | Malaysia (H) | 3 | 2 | 1 | 0 | 4 | 0.663 | Advanced to the knockout stage |
| 3 | Kuwait | 3 | 1 | 2 | 0 | 2 | −0.745 | Eliminated |
| 4 | Singapore | 3 | 0 | 3 | 0 | 0 | −2.232 | Eliminated |

Source: ESPNcricinfo
(H) Hosts

Group B standings
| Pos | Team | Pld | W | L | NR | Pts | NRR | Qualification |
|---|---|---|---|---|---|---|---|---|
| 1 | United Arab Emirates | 4 | 4 | 0 | 0 | 8 | 7.923 | Advanced to the knockout stage |
| 2 | Oman | 4 | 3 | 1 | 0 | 6 | 1.161 | Advanced to the knockout stage |
| 3 | China | 4 | 1 | 2 | 1 | 3 | 0.100 | Eliminated |
| 4 | Philippines | 4 | 1 | 3 | 0 | 2 | −1.332 | Eliminated |
| 5 | Saudi Arabia | 4 | 0 | 3 | 1 | 1 | −8.964 | Eliminated |

Source: ESPNcricinfo

Group D standings
| Pos | Team | Pld | W | L | NR | Pts | NRR | Qualification |
|---|---|---|---|---|---|---|---|---|
| 1 | Hong Kong | 3 | 3 | 0 | 0 | 6 | 2.767 | Advanced to the knockout stage |
| 2 | Nepal | 3 | 2 | 1 | 0 | 4 | 0.428 | Advanced to the knockout stage |
| 3 | Bhutan | 3 | 1 | 2 | 0 | 2 | −0.947 | Eliminated |
| 4 | Qatar | 3 | 0 | 3 | 0 | 0 | −2.666 | Eliminated |

Source: ESPNcricinfo

Group stage
| No. | Date | Team 1 | Team 2 | Venue | Result |
|---|---|---|---|---|---|
| WT20I 2801 | 3 June | Malaysia | Kuwait | Bayuemas Oval, Pandamaran | Malaysia by 9 runs |
| WT20I 2802 | 3 June | Saudi Arabia | United Arab Emirates | UKM-YSD Cricket Oval, Bangi | United Arab Emirates by 10 wickets |
| WT20I 2803 | 3 June | Mongolia | Thailand | Selangor Turf Club, Kuala Lumpur | Thailand by 10 wickets |
| WT20I 2804 | 3 June | Nepal | Qatar | Kolej Tuanku Ja'afar Cricket Oval, Mantin | Nepal by 8 wickets |
| WT20I 2805 | 3 June | Bahrain | Myanmar | Bayuemas Oval, Pandamaran | Myanmar by 8 wickets |
| WT20I 2806 | 3 June | China | Oman | UKM-YSD Cricket Oval, Bangi | Oman by 16 runs |
| WT20I 2807 | 3 June | Indonesia | Singapore | Selangor Turf Club, Kuala Lumpur | Indonesia by 8 wickets |
| WT20I 2808 | 3 June | Bhutan | Hong Kong | Kolej Tuanku Ja'afar Cricket Oval, Mantin | Hong Kong by 14 runs |
| WT20I 2811 | 4 June | Malaysia | Singapore | Bayuemas Oval, Pandamaran | Malaysia by 40 runs |
| WT20I 2812 | 4 June | Bahrain | Thailand | UKM-YSD Cricket Oval, Bangi | Thailand by 10 wickets |
| WT20I 2813 | 4 June | Oman | United Arab Emirates | Selangor Turf Club, Kuala Lumpur | United Arab Emirates by 9 wickets |
| WT20I 2814 | 4 June | Bhutan | Nepal | Kolej Tuanku Ja'afar Cricket Oval, Mantin | Nepal by 51 runs |
| WT20I 2815 | 4 June | Japan | Mongolia | Bayuemas Oval, Pandamaran | Japan by 116 runs |
| WT20I 2816 | 4 June | Philippines | Saudi Arabia | UKM-YSD Cricket Oval, Bangi | Philippines by 133 runs |
| WT20I 2817 | 4 June | Indonesia | Kuwait | Selangor Turf Club, Kuala Lumpur | Indonesia by 10 wickets |
| WT20I 2818 | 4 June | Hong Kong | Qatar | Kolej Tuanku Ja'afar Cricket Oval, Mantin | Hong Kong by 83 runs |
| WT20I 2820 | 6 June | Malaysia | Indonesia | Bayuemas Oval, Pandamaran | Indonesia by 6 wickets |
| WT20I 2821 | 6 June | China | Philippines | UKM-YSD Cricket Oval, Bangi | China by 8 wickets |
| WT20I 2822 | 6 June | Japan | Myanmar | Selangor Turf Club, Kuala Lumpur | Japan by 12 runs |
| WT20I 2823 | 6 June | Bhutan | Qatar | Kolej Tuanku Ja'afar Cricket Oval, Mantin | Bhutan by 5 wickets |
| WT20I 2824 | 6 June | Bahrain | Mongolia | Bayuemas Oval, Pandamaran | Mongolia by 3 wickets |
| WT20I 2825 | 6 June | Oman | Saudi Arabia | UKM-YSD Cricket Oval, Bangi | Oman by 10 wickets |
| WT20I 2826 | 6 June | Kuwait | Singapore | Selangor Turf Club, Kuala Lumpur | Kuwait by 10 wickets |
| WT20I 2827 | 6 June | Hong Kong | Nepal | Kolej Tuanku Ja'afar Cricket Oval, Mantin | Hong Kong by 69 runs |
| WT20I 2828 | 7 June | Myanmar | Thailand | Bayuemas Oval, Pandamaran | Thailand by 10 wickets |
| WT20I 2829 | 7 June | China | United Arab Emirates | UKM-YSD Cricket Oval, Bangi | United Arab Emirates by 18 runs |
| WT20I 2830 | 7 June | Bahrain | Japan | Bayuemas Oval, Pandamaran | Japan by 48 runs |
| WT20I 2831 | 7 June | Oman | Philippines | UKM-YSD Cricket Oval, Bangi | Oman by 44 runs |
| WT20I 2832 | 9 June | Japan | Thailand | Bayuemas Oval, Pandamaran | Thailand by 42 runs |
| WT20I 2833 | 9 June | Mongolia | Myanmar | UKM-YSD Cricket Oval, Bangi | Myanmar by 102 runs |
| WT20I 2834 | 9 June | Philippines | United Arab Emirates | Bayuemas Oval, Pandamaran | United Arab Emirates by 149 runs |
| WT20I 2835 | 9 June | China | Saudi Arabia | UKM-YSD Cricket Oval, Bangi | No result |
Quarter-finals
| WT20I 2836 | 10 June | Nepal | Thailand | Bayuemas Oval, Pandamaran | Thailand by 56 runs |
| WT20I 2837 | 10 June | Hong Kong | Japan | UKM-YSD Cricket Oval, Bangi | Hong Kong by 41 runs |
| WT20I 2838 | 10 June | Malaysia | United Arab Emirates | Bayuemas Oval, Pandamaran | United Arab Emirates by 52 runs |
| WT20I 2839 | 10 June | Indonesia | Oman | UKM-YSD Cricket Oval, Bangi | Indonesia by 113 runs |
Semi-finals
| WT20I 2840 | 12 June | Indonesia | Thailand | Bayuemas Oval, Pandamaran | Thailand by 6 wickets |
| WT20I 2841 | 12 June | Hong Kong | United Arab Emirates | Bayuemas Oval, Pandamaran | United Arab Emirates by 10 wickets |
3rd-place play-off
| WT20I 2843 | 13 June | Hong Kong | Indonesia | Bayuemas Oval, Pandamaran | Indonesia by 6 wickets |
Final
| WT20I 2844 | 13 June | Thailand | United Arab Emirates | Bayuemas Oval, Pandamaran | Thailand by 6 wickets |

=== 2026 ACC Men's Challenger Cup ===
Group A standings
| Pos | Team | Pld | W | L | NR | Pts | NRR | Qualification |
|---|---|---|---|---|---|---|---|---|
| 1 | Malaysia | 1 | 1 | 0 | 0 | 2 | 3.532 | Advanced to the knockout stage |
| 2 | China | 1 | 0 | 1 | 0 | 0 | −3.532 | Advanced to the knockout stage |

Source: Asian Cricket Council

Group B standings
| Pos | Team | Pld | W | L | NR | Pts | NRR | Qualification |
|---|---|---|---|---|---|---|---|---|
| 1 | Singapore (H) | 2 | 1 | 0 | 1 | 3 | 2.388 | Advanced to the knockout stage |
| 2 | Maldives | 2 | 1 | 1 | 0 | 2 | 1.692 | Advanced to the knockout stage |
| 3 | Myanmar | 2 | 0 | 1 | 1 | 1 | −4.420 | Eliminated |

Source: Asian Cricket Council
(H) Hosts

Group C standings
| Pos | Team | Pld | W | L | NR | Pts | NRR | Qualification |
|---|---|---|---|---|---|---|---|---|
| 1 | Thailand | 1 | 0 | 0 | 1 | 1 | — | Advanced to the knockout stage |
| 2 | Bhutan | 1 | 0 | 0 | 1 | 1 | — | Advanced to the knockout stage |

Source: Asian Cricket Council

Group D standings
| Pos | Team | Pld | W | L | NR | Pts | NRR | Qualification |
|---|---|---|---|---|---|---|---|---|
| 1 | Indonesia | 2 | 2 | 0 | 0 | 4 | 6.620 | Advanced to the knockout stage |
| 2 | Uzbekistan | 2 | 1 | 1 | 0 | 2 | −6.620 | Advanced to the knockout stage |
| 3 | Cambodia | 2 | 0 | 2 | 0 | 0 | — | Eliminated |

Source: Asian Cricket Council

Group stage
| No. | Date | Team 1 | Team 2 | Venue | Result |
|---|---|---|---|---|---|
| 1st Match | 10 June | China | Malaysia | Singa Oval, Singapore | Malaysia by 7 wickets |
| 2nd Match | 10 June | Singapore | Maldives | Singapore National Cricket Ground, Singapore | Singapore by 6 wickets |
| 3rd Match | 11 June | Bhutan | Thailand | Singa Oval, Singapore | Match abandoned |
| 4th Match | 11 June | Cambodia | Indonesia | Singapore National Cricket Ground, Singapore | Indonesia by forfeit |
| 5th Match | 12 June | Cambodia | Uzbekistan | Singa Oval, Singapore | Uzbekistan by forfeit |
| 6th Match | 12 June | Singapore | Myanmar | Singapore National Cricket Ground, Singapore | No result |
| 7th Match | 13 June | Indonesia | Uzbekistan | Singa Oval, Singapore | Indonesia by 321 runs |
| 8th Match | 13 June | Maldives | Myanmar | Singapore National Cricket Ground, Singapore | Maldives by 221 runs |
Quarter-finals
| 9th Match | 15 June | Malaysia | Uzbekistan | Singa Oval, Singapore | Malaysia by 9 wickets |
| 10th Match | 15 June | China | Indonesia | Singapore National Cricket Ground, Singapore | Indonesia by 8 wickets |
| 11th Match | 16 June | Maldives | Thailand | Singa Oval, Singapore | Thailand by 95 runs |
| 12th Match | 16 June | Bhutan | Singapore | Singapore National Cricket Ground, Singapore | Singapore by 116 runs |
Semi-finals
| 13th Match | 18 June | Malaysia | Thailand | Singa Oval, Singapore | Malaysia by 218 runs |
| 14th Match | 18 June | Indonesia | Singapore | Singapore National Cricket Ground, Singapore | Singapore by 6 wickets |
3rd-place play-off
| 15th Match | 20 June | Thailand | Indonesia | Singa Oval, Singapore | Match tied (Thailand won S/O) |
Final
| 16th Match | 20 June | Singapore | Malaysia | Singapore National Cricket Ground, Singapore | Malaysia by 6 wickets |

=== 2026 Kwibuka Women's T20 Tournament ===
| Pos | Team | Pld | W | L | NR | Pts | NRR |
|---|---|---|---|---|---|---|---|
| 1 | Rwanda | 8 | 6 | 2 | 0 | 12 | 1.422 |
| 2 | Zimbabwe XI | 8 | 6 | 2 | 0 | 12 | 1.268 |
| 3 | Brazil | 8 | 5 | 3 | 0 | 10 | −0.318 |
| 4 | Nigeria | 8 | 3 | 5 | 0 | 6 | 0.357 |
| 5 | Malawi | 8 | 0 | 8 | 0 | 0 | −2.773 |

Source: Cricinfo

Round-robin
| No. | Date | Team 1 | Team 2 | Venue | Result |
|---|---|---|---|---|---|
| 1st Match | 10 June | Rwanda | Zimbabwe XI | Gahanga International Cricket Stadium, Kigali | Zimbabwe XI by 3 wickets |
| WT20I 2840 | 10 June | Malawi | Nigeria | Gahanga B Ground, Kigali | Nigeria by 52 runs |
| 3rd Match | 10 June | Brazil | Zimbabwe XI | Gahanga International Cricket Stadium, Kigali | Zimbabwe XI by 47 runs |
| WT20I 2841 | 11 June | Brazil | Nigeria | Gahanga International Cricket Stadium, Kigali | Brazil by 7 wickets |
| WT20I 2842 | 11 June | Rwanda | Malawi | Gahanga B Ground, Kigali | Rwanda by 66 runs |
| 6th Match | 11 June | Nigeria | Zimbabwe XI | Gahanga International Cricket Stadium, Kigali | Nigeria by 7 wickets |
| WT20I 2845 | 12 June | Rwanda | Nigeria | Gahanga International Cricket Stadium, Kigali | Rwanda by 2 runs |
| WT20I 2846 | 12 June | Brazil | Malawi | Gahanga B Ground, Kigali | Brazil by 42 runs |
| 9th Match | 12 June | Brazil | Zimbabwe XI | Gahanga International Cricket Stadium, Kigali | Zimbabwe XI by 3 wickets |
| 10th Match | 14 June | Malawi | Zimbabwe XI | Gahanga International Cricket Stadium, Kigali | Zimbabwe XI by 27 runs |
| WT20I 2853 | 14 June | Rwanda | Brazil | Gahanga B Ground, Kigali | Rwanda by 58 runs |
| WT20I 2856 | 14 June | Malawi | Nigeria | Gahanga International Cricket Stadium, Kigali | Nigeria by 5 wickets |
| 13th Match | 15 June | Rwanda | Zimbabwe XI | Gahanga International Cricket Stadium, Kigali | Rwanda by 33 runs |
| WT20I 2859 | 15 June | Brazil | Nigeria | Gahanga B Ground, Kigali | Brazil by 7 wickets |
| WT20I 2860 | 15 June | Rwanda | Malawi | Gahanga International Cricket Stadium, Kigali | Rwanda by 68 runs |
| 16th Match | 17 June | Nigeria | Zimbabwe XI | Gahanga International Cricket Stadium, Kigali | Zimbabwe XI by 37 runs |
| WT20I 2864 | 17 June | Brazil | Malawi | Gahanga International Cricket Stadium, Kigali | Brazil by 11 runs |
| WT20I 2868 | 18 June | Rwanda | Brazil | Gahanga B Ground, Kigali | Match tied (Brazil won S/O) |
| 19th Match | 18 June | Malawi | Zimbabwe XI | Gahanga B Ground, Kigali | Zimbabwe XI by 105 runs |
| WT20I 2872 | 19 June | Rwanda | Nigeria | Gahanga B Ground, Kigali | Rwanda by 11 runs |
3rd-place play-off
| WT20I 2875 | 20 June | Brazil | Nigeria | Gahanga International Cricket Stadium, Kigali | Nigeria by 2 wickets |
Final
| 22nd Match | 20 June | Rwanda | Zimbabwe XI | Gahanga International Cricket Stadium, Kigali | Zimbabwe XI by 1 run |

=== 2026 Viking Cup ===
| Pos | Team | Pld | W | L | NR | Pts | NRR |
|---|---|---|---|---|---|---|---|
| 1 | Finland | 3 | 3 | 0 | 0 | 6 | 1.386 |
| 2 | Sweden | 3 | 2 | 1 | 0 | 4 | 1.363 |
| 3 | Norway | 3 | 1 | 2 | 0 | 2 | 0.458 |
| 4 | Austria | 3 | 0 | 3 | 0 | 0 | −3.190 |

Source: Cricinfo

Round-robin
| No. | Date | Team 1 | Team 2 | Venue | Result |
|---|---|---|---|---|---|
| T20I 3945 | 11 June | Sweden | Norway | Botkyrka Cricket Center, Stockholm | Sweden by 5 wickets |
| T20I 3946 | 11 June | Austria | Finland | Botkyrka Cricket Center, Stockholm | Finland by 6 wickets |
| T20I 3948 | 12 June | Sweden | Finland | Botkyrka Cricket Center, Stockholm | Finland by 1 wicket |
| T20I 3949 | 12 June | Austria | Norway | Botkyrka Cricket Center, Stockholm | Norway by 78 runs |
| T20I 3950 | 13 June | Finland | Norway | Botkyrka Cricket Center, Stockholm | Finland by 36 runs |
| T20I 3951 | 13 June | Sweden | Austria | Botkyrka Cricket Center, Stockholm | Sweden by 75 runs |
3rd-place play-off
| T20I 3953 | 14 June | Austria | Norway | Botkyrka Cricket Center, Stockholm | Austria by 15 runs (DLS) |
Final
| T20I 3954 | 14 June | Sweden | Finland | Botkyrka Cricket Center, Stockholm | Sweden by 9 wickets |

=== Guernsey women in Jersey ===
Inter-Insular (WT20I series)
| No. | Date | Venue | Result |
|---|---|---|---|
| WT20I 2855 | 14 June | Grainville Cricket Ground, Saint Saviour | Jersey by 100 runs |
| WT20I 2858 | 14 June | Grainville Cricket Ground, Saint Saviour | Jersey by 100 runs |

=== Malta women in Cyprus ===
WT20I series
| No. | Date | Venue | Result |
|---|---|---|---|
| WT20I 2867 | 18 June | Happy Valley Ground, Episkopi | Cyprus by 24 runs |
| WT20I 2869 | 18 June | Happy Valley Ground, Episkopi | Cyprus by 82 runs |
| WT20I 2871 | 19 June | Happy Valley Ground, Episkopi | Cyprus by 5 wickets |
| WT20I 2873 | 19 June | Happy Valley Ground, Episkopi | Cyprus by 28 runs |
| WT20I 2876 | 20 June | Happy Valley Ground, Episkopi | Cyprus by 51 runs |

=== 2026 Namibia Tri-Nation Series ===
| Pos | Team | Pld | W | L | NR | Pts | NRR |
|---|---|---|---|---|---|---|---|
| 1 | Namibia | 4 | 4 | 0 | 0 | 8 | 2.901 |
| 2 | Hong Kong | 4 | 2 | 2 | 0 | 4 | 0.313 |
| 3 | Nigeria | 4 | 0 | 4 | 0 | 0 | −3.292 |

Source: Cricinfo

Round-robin
| No. | Date | Team 1 | Team 2 | Venue | Result |
|---|---|---|---|---|---|
| T20I 3957 | 18 June | Hong Kong | Nigeria | Namibia Cricket Ground, Windhoek | Hong Kong by 8 wickets |
| T20I 3963 | 19 June | Namibia | Hong Kong | Namibia Cricket Ground, Windhoek | Namibia by 7 wickets |
| T20I 3969 | 20 June | Namibia | Nigeria | Namibia Cricket Ground, Windhoek | Namibia by 90 runs |
| T20I 3974 | 21 June | Hong Kong | Nigeria | Namibia Cricket Ground, Windhoek | Hong Kong by 6 wickets |
| T20I 3978 | 22 June | Namibia | Hong Kong | Namibia Cricket Ground, Windhoek | Namibia by 30 runs |
| T20I 3983 | 23 June | Namibia | Nigeria | Namibia Cricket Ground, Windhoek | Namibia by 93 runs |

=== Germany in Denmark ===
T20I series
| No. | Date | Venue | Result |
|---|---|---|---|
| T20I 3958 | 18 June | Svanholm Park, Brøndby | Germany by 2 wickets |
| T20I 3961 | 19 June | Svanholm Park, Brøndby | Denmark by 7 wickets |
| T20I 3964 | 19 June | Svanholm Park, Brøndby | Denmark by 5 wickets |
| T20I 3967 | 20 June | Svanholm Park, Brøndby | Denmark by 5 wickets |

=== 2026 Men's Continental Cup ===
| Pos | Team | Pld | W | L | NR | Pts | NRR |
|---|---|---|---|---|---|---|---|
| 1 | Belgium | 3 | 3 | 0 | 0 | 6 | 0.767 |
| 2 | Switzerland | 3 | 2 | 1 | 0 | 4 | 0.067 |
| 3 | Romania | 3 | 1 | 2 | 0 | 2 | 0.159 |
| 4 | Hungary | 3 | 0 | 3 | 0 | 0 | −1.038 |

Source: Cricinfo

Round-robin
| No. | Date | Team 1 | Team 2 | Venue | Result |
|---|---|---|---|---|---|
| T20I 3959 | 19 June | Romania | Belgium | Moara Vlasei Cricket Ground, Ilfov County | Belgium by 20 runs |
| T20I 3962 | 19 June | Romania | Switzerland | Moara Vlasei Cricket Ground, Ilfov County | Switzerland by 4 wickets |
| T20I 3965 | 19 June | Hungary | Switzerland | Moara Vlasei Cricket Ground, Ilfov County | Switzerland by 3 wickets |
| T20I 3966 | 20 June | Romania | Hungary | Moara Vlasei Cricket Ground, Ilfov County | Romania by 5 wickets |
| T20I 3968 | 20 June | Belgium | Hungary | Moara Vlasei Cricket Ground, Ilfov County | Belgium by 10 runs |
| T20I 3970 | 20 June | Belgium | Switzerland | Moara Vlasei Cricket Ground, Ilfov County | Belgium by 16 runs |
Semi-finals
| T20I 3971 | 21 June | Belgium | Hungary | Moara Vlasei Cricket Ground, Ilfov County | Belgium by 87 runs |
| T20I 3973 | 21 June | Romania | Switzerland | Moara Vlasei Cricket Ground, Ilfov County | Romania by 51 runs |
Final
| T20I 3975 | 21 June | Romania | Belgium | Moara Vlasei Cricket Ground, Ilfov County | Belgium by 8 runs |

=== 2026 Men's T20 World Cup Americas Sub-regional Qualifier A ===
Qualifier A standings
| Pos | Team | Pld | W | L | NR | Pts | NRR | Qualification |
|---|---|---|---|---|---|---|---|---|
| 1 | Bermuda (H) | 4 | 3 | 0 | 1 | 7 | 7.776 | Advanced to the regional final |
| 2 | Bahamas | 4 | 2 | 1 | 1 | 5 | 0.255 | Advanced to the regional final |
| 3 | Panama | 4 | 2 | 1 | 1 | 5 | −0.170 | Eliminated |
| 4 | Belize | 4 | 1 | 2 | 1 | 3 | −1.087 | Eliminated |
| 5 | Brazil | 4 | 0 | 4 | 0 | 0 | −3.134 | Eliminated |

Source: ESPNcricinfo
(H) Host

Round-robin
| No. | Date | Team 1 | Team 2 | Venue | Result |
|---|---|---|---|---|---|
| T20I 3974a | 21 June | Belize | Panama | White Hill Field, Sandys Parish | Match abandoned |
| T20I 3976 | 21 June | Bermuda | Bahamas | White Hill Field, Sandys Parish | No result |
| T20I 3979 | 22 June | Bermuda | Belize | White Hill Field, Sandys Parish | Bermuda by 10 wickets (DLS) |
| T20I 3980 | 22 June | Brazil | Panama | White Hill Field, Sandys Parish | Panama by 69 runs |
| T20I 3984 | 24 June | Bahamas | Panama | White Hill Field, Sandys Parish | Panama by 4 wickets |
| T20I 3985 | 24 June | Belize | Brazil | White Hill Field, Sandys Parish | Belize by 8 wickets |
| T20I 3988 | 25 June | Bermuda | Panama | White Hill Field, Sandys Parish | Bermuda by 10 wickets |
| T20I 3989 | 25 June | Bahamas | Brazil | White Hill Field, Sandys Parish | Bahamas by 6 wickets |
| T20I 3998 | 27 June | Bahamas | Belize | White Hill Field, Sandys Parish | Bahamas by 22 runs |
| T20I 3999 | 27 June | Bermuda | Brazil | White Hill Field, Sandys Parish | Bermuda by 146 runs |

=== 2026 Asia Pacific Cricket Champions Trophy ===
| Pos | Team | Pld | W | L | NR | Pts | NRR |
|---|---|---|---|---|---|---|---|
| 1 | Singapore | 3 | 3 | 0 | 0 | 6 | 5.479 |
| 2 | Thailand | 3 | 1 | 1 | 1 | 3 | 0.189 |
| 3 | Indonesia | 3 | 1 | 1 | 1 | 3 | −0.100 |
| 4 | Uzbekistan | 3 | 0 | 3 | 0 | 0 | −7.731 |

Source: Cricinfo

Round-robin
| No. | Date | Team 1 | Team 2 | Venue | Result |
|---|---|---|---|---|---|
| T20I 3976a | 22 June | Indonesia | Thailand | Singapore National Cricket Ground, Singapore | Match abandoned |
| T20I 3977 | 22 June | Singapore | Uzbekistan | Singapore National Cricket Ground, Singapore | Singapore by 52 runs |
| T20I 3981 | 23 June | Indonesia | Uzbekistan | Singapore National Cricket Ground, Singapore | Indonesia by 119 runs |
| T20I 3982 | 23 June | Singapore | Thailand | Singapore National Cricket Ground, Singapore | Singapore by 88 runs |
| T20I 3986 | 25 June | Thailand | Uzbekistan | Singapore National Cricket Ground, Singapore | Thailand by 8 wickets |
| T20I 3987 | 25 June | Singapore | Indonesia | Singapore National Cricket Ground, Singapore | Singapore by 123 runs |
3rd-place play-off
| T20I 3990 | 26 June | Indonesia | Uzbekistan | Singapore National Cricket Ground, Singapore | Indonesia by 97 runs |
Final
| T20I 3992 | 26 June | Singapore | Thailand | Singapore National Cricket Ground, Singapore | Singapore by 6 wickets |

=== 2026 Men's Central Europe Cup ===
| Pos | Team | Pld | W | L | NR | Pts | NRR |
|---|---|---|---|---|---|---|---|
| 1 | Czech Republic | 4 | 3 | 1 | 0 | 6 | 2.061 |
| 2 | Luxembourg | 4 | 3 | 1 | 0 | 6 | 1.216 |
| 3 | Serbia | 4 | 0 | 4 | 0 | 0 | −3.518 |

Source: Cricinfo

Round-robin
| No. | Date | Team 1 | Team 2 | Venue | Result |
|---|---|---|---|---|---|
| T20I 3991 | 26 June | Luxembourg | Serbia | Vinoř Cricket Ground (Scott Page Field), Prague | Luxembourg by 6 wickets |
| T20I 3994 | 26 June | Czech Republic | Luxembourg | Vinoř Cricket Ground (Scott Page Field), Prague | Luxembourg by 2 wickets |
| T20I 3995 | 27 June | Czech Republic | Serbia | Vinoř Cricket Ground (Scott Page Field), Prague | Czech Republic by 104 runs |
| T20I 3997 | 27 June | Luxembourg | Serbia | Vinoř Cricket Ground (Scott Page Field), Prague | Luxembourg by 8 wickets |
| T20I 4001 | 28 June | Czech Republic | Luxembourg | Vinoř Cricket Ground (Scott Page Field), Prague | Czech Republic by 37 runs |
| T20I 4003 | 28 June | Czech Republic | Serbia | Vinoř Cricket Ground (Scott Page Field), Prague | Czech Republic by 7 wickets |

=== 2026 Women's Central Europe Cup ===
| Pos | Team | Pld | W | L | NR | Pts | NRR |
|---|---|---|---|---|---|---|---|
| 1 | Czech Republic | 4 | 4 | 0 | 0 | 8 | 2.745 |
| 2 | Norway | 4 | 2 | 2 | 0 | 4 | 0.217 |
| 3 | Luxembourg | 4 | 0 | 4 | 0 | 0 | −3.063 |

Source: Cricinfo

Round-robin
| No. | Date | Team 1 | Team 2 | Venue | Result |
|---|---|---|---|---|---|
| WT20I 2888 | 26 June | Luxembourg | Norway | Vinoř Cricket Ground (Banks Field), Prague | Norway by 13 runs |
| WT20I 2890 | 26 June | Czech Republic | Luxembourg | Vinoř Cricket Ground (Banks Field), Prague | Czech Republic by 10 wickets |
| WT20I 2894 | 27 June | Czech Republic | Norway | Vinoř Cricket Ground (Banks Field), Prague | Czech Republic by 33 runs |
| WT20I 2897 | 27 June | Luxembourg | Norway | Vinoř Cricket Ground (Banks Field), Prague | Norway by 45 runs |
| WT20I 2903 | 28 June | Czech Republic | Luxembourg | Vinoř Cricket Ground (Banks Field), Prague | Czech Republic by 8 wickets |
| WT20I 2905 | 28 June | Czech Republic | Norway | Vinoř Cricket Ground (Banks Field), Prague | Czech Republic by 6 wickets |

=== Serbia women in Bulgaria ===
Balkan Cup (WT20I series)
| No. | Date | Venue | Result |
|---|---|---|---|
| WT20I 2889 | 26 June | Vasil Levski National Sports Academy, Sofia | Serbia by 5 wickets |
| WT20I 2892 | 27 June | Vasil Levski National Sports Academy, Sofia | Bulgaria by 7 runs |
| WT20I 2896 | 27 June | Vasil Levski National Sports Academy, Sofia | Serbia by 84 runs |
| WT20I 2901 | 28 June | Vasil Levski National Sports Academy, Sofia | Serbia by 5 wickets |

=== Switzerland women in Denmark ===
WT20I series
| No. | Date | Venue | Result |
|---|---|---|---|
| WT20I 2893 | 27 June | Albertslund Cricket Club, Albertslund | Denmark by 44 runs |
| WT20I 2898 | 27 June | Albertslund Cricket Club, Albertslund | Switzerland by 6 wickets |
| WT20I 2902 | 28 June | Albertslund Cricket Club, Albertslund | Denmark by 14 runs |
| WT20I 2906 | 28 June | Albertslund Cricket Club, Albertslund | Denmark by 9 runs |

=== Austria in Hungary ===
T20I series
| No. | Date | Venue | Result |
|---|---|---|---|
| T20I 3996 | 27 June | GB Oval, Sződliget | Austria by 8 wickets |
| T20I 4000 | 28 June | GB Oval, Sződliget | Austria by 9 wickets |
| T20I 4002 | 28 June | GB Oval, Sződliget | Austria by 157 runs |

== July ==
=== Portugal in Sweden ===
T20I series
| No. | Date | Venue | Result |
|---|---|---|---|
| T20I 4005 | 1 July | Botkyrka Cricket Center, Stockholm | Portugal by 12 runs |
| T20I 4006 | 1 July | Botkyrka Cricket Center, Stockholm | Portugal by 7 wickets |
| T20I 4008 | 2 July | Botkyrka Cricket Center, Stockholm | Match tied (Portugal won S/O) |

=== Portugal in Finland ===
T20I series
| No. | Date | Venue | Result |
|---|---|---|---|
| T20I 4009 | 3 July | Kerava National Cricket Ground, Kerava | Portugal by 32 runs |
| T20I 4010 | 4 July | Kerava National Cricket Ground, Kerava | No result |
| T20I 4011 | 4 July | Kerava National Cricket Ground, Kerava | Portugal by 8 runs |
| T20I 4012a | 5 July | Kerava National Cricket Ground, Kerava | Match abandoned |
| T20I 4012b | 5 July | Kerava National Cricket Ground, Kerava | Match abandoned |

=== 2026 Men's T20 World Cup Europe Sub-regional Qualifier B ===
Group A standings
| Pos | Team | Pld | W | L | NR | Pts | NRR | Qualification |
|---|---|---|---|---|---|---|---|---|
| 1 | Romania | 3 | 3 | 0 | 0 | 6 | 1.319 | Advanced to the final |
| 2 | Belgium | 3 | 2 | 1 | 0 | 4 | 1.494 | Advanced to the 3rd place play-off |
| 3 | Gibraltar | 3 | 1 | 2 | 0 | 2 | −0.562 | Advanced to the 5th place play-off |
| 4 | Serbia | 3 | 0 | 3 | 0 | 0 | −2.392 | Advanced to the 7th place play-off |

Source: ESPNcricinfo

Group B standings
| Pos | Team | Pld | W | L | NR | Pts | NRR | Qualification |
|---|---|---|---|---|---|---|---|---|
| 1 | Denmark (H) | 4 | 4 | 0 | 0 | 8 | 3.925 | Advanced to the final |
| 2 | Hungary | 4 | 3 | 1 | 0 | 6 | −0.585 | Advanced to the 3rd place play-off |
| 3 | Norway | 4 | 2 | 2 | 0 | 4 | 1.568 | Advanced to the 5th place play-off |
| 4 | Estonia | 4 | 1 | 3 | 0 | 2 | −1.963 | Advance to the 7th place play-off |
| 5 | Turkey | 4 | 0 | 4 | 0 | 0 | −4.318 | Eliminated |

Source: ESPNcricinfo
(H) Host

Group stage
| No. | Date | Team 1 | Team 2 | Venue | Result |
|---|---|---|---|---|---|
| T20I 4014 | 8 July | Denmark | Estonia | Svanholm Park, Brøndby | Denmark by 108 runs |
| T20I 4015 | 8 July | Belgium | Gibraltar | Koge Cricket Club, Køge | Belgium by 7 wickets |
| T20I 4016 | 8 July | Hungary | Norway | Svanholm Park, Brøndby | Hungary by 2 runs |
| T20I 4017 | 8 July | Romania | Serbia | Koge Cricket Club, Køge | Romania by 8 wickets |
| T20I 4018 | 9 July | Denmark | Turkey | Koge Cricket Club, Køge | Denmark by 86 runs |
| T20I 4019 | 9 July | Estonia | Norway | Koge Cricket Club, Køge | Norway by 2 wickets |
| T20I 4021 | 10 July | Gibraltar | Romania | Svanholm Park, Brøndby | Romania by 1 wicket |
| T20I 4022 | 10 July | Estonia | Hungary | Koge Cricket Club, Køge | Hungary by 6 runs |
| T20I 4023 | 10 July | Belgium | Serbia | Svanholm Park, Brøndby | Belgium by 64 runs |
| T20I 4024 | 10 July | Norway | Turkey | Koge Cricket Club, Køge | Norway by 7 wickets |
| T20I 4026 | 12 July | Denmark | Norway | Svanholm Park, Brøndby | Denmark by 54 runs |
| T20I 4027 | 12 July | Belgium | Romania | Koge Cricket Club, Køge | Romania by 2 wickets |
| T20I 4028 | 12 July | Hungary | Turkey | Svanholm Park, Brøndby | Hungary by 20 runs (DLS) |
| T20I 4029 | 12 July | Gibraltar | Serbia | Koge Cricket Club, Køge | Gibraltar by 2 wickets |
| T20I 4030 | 13 July | Denmark | Hungary | Svanholm Park, Brøndby | Denmark by 66 runs |
| T20I 4031 | 13 July | Estonia | Turkey | Svanholm Park, Brøndby | Estonia by 6 wickets |
7th Place play-off
| T20I 4033 | 14 July | Estonia | Serbia | Koge Cricket Club, Køge | Estonia by 6 wickets |
5th Place play-off
| T20I 4034 | 14 July | Gibraltar | Norway | Koge Cricket Club, Køge | Norway by 24 runs |
3rd Place play-off
| T20I 4032 | 14 July | Belgium | Hungary | Svanholm Park, Brøndby | Belgium by 10 wickets |
Final
| T20I 4035 | 14 July | Denmark | Romania | Svanholm Park, Brøndby | Denmark by 6 runs |

=== Switzerland women in Germany ===
WT20I series
| No. | Date | Venue | Result |
|---|---|---|---|
| WT20I 2911 | 10 July | Sport and Swimming Club, Karlsruhe | Germany by 2 runs |
| WT20I 2912 | 10 July | Sport and Swimming Club, Karlsruhe | Germany by 10 wickets |
| WT20I 2913 | 11 July | Sport and Swimming Club, Karlsruhe | Germany by 13 runs |
| WT20I 2914 | 11 July | Sport and Swimming Club, Karlsruhe | Germany by 4 runs |
| WT20I 2915 | 12 July | Sport and Swimming Club, Karlsruhe | Switzerland by 25 runs |

=== 2026 Capricorn Women's Quadrangular Series ===
| Pos | Team | Pld | W | L | NR | Pts | NRR |
|---|---|---|---|---|---|---|---|
| 1 | Namibia | 6 | 6 | 0 | 0 | 12 | 1.406 |
| 2 | Uganda | 6 | 4 | 2 | 0 | 8 | 0.310 |
| 3 | Hong Kong | 6 | 2 | 4 | 0 | 4 | −0.515 |
| 4 | Tanzania | 6 | 0 | 6 | 0 | 0 | −1.259 |

Source: Cricinfo

Round-robin
| No. | Date | Team 1 | Team 2 | Venue | Result |
|---|---|---|---|---|---|
| WT20I 2916 | 21 July | Hong Kong | Uganda | High Performance Oval, Windhoek | Uganda by 6 wickets |
| WT20I 2917 | 21 July | Namibia | Tanzania | High Performance Oval, Windhoek | Namibia by 9 wickets |
| WT20I 2918 | 22 July | Namibia | Uganda | High Performance Oval, Windhoek | Match tied (Namibia won S/O) |
| WT20I 2919 | 22 July | Hong Kong | Tanzania | High Performance Oval, Windhoek | Hong Kong by 16 runs |
| WT20I 2920 | 24 July | Tanzania | Uganda | High Performance Oval, Windhoek | Uganda by 5 runs |
| WT20I 2921 | 24 July | Namibia | Hong Kong | High Performance Oval, Windhoek | Namibia by 5 wickets |
| WT20I 2922 | 25 July | Namibia | Tanzania | High Performance Oval, Windhoek | Namibia by 9 wickets |
| WT20I 2924 | 25 July | Hong Kong | Uganda | High Performance Oval, Windhoek | Uganda by 2 wickets |
| WT20I 2926 | 27 July | Hong Kong | Tanzania | High Performance Oval, Windhoek | Hong Kong by 9 wickets |
| WT20I 2928 | 27 July | Namibia | Uganda | High Performance Oval, Windhoek | Namibia by 6 wickets |
| WT20I 2930 | 28 July | Namibia | Hong Kong | High Performance Oval, Windhoek | Namibia by 8 wickets |
| WT20I 2933 | 28 July | Tanzania | Uganda | High Performance Oval, Windhoek | Uganda by concession |
3rd place play-off
| WT20I 2938 | 30 July | Hong Kong | Tanzania | High Performance Oval, Windhoek | Tanzania by 7 wickets |
Final
| WT20I 2940 | 30 July | Namibia | Uganda | High Performance Oval, Windhoek | Uganda by 17 runs |

=== 2026 ECA Men's European Cup ===
| Pos | Team | Pld | W | L | NR | Pts | NRR |
|---|---|---|---|---|---|---|---|
| 1 | France | 4 | 3 | 1 | 0 | 6 | 3.165 |
| 2 | Romania | 4 | 3 | 1 | 0 | 6 | 2.230 |
| 3 | Austria | 4 | 3 | 1 | 0 | 6 | 1.894 |
| 4 | Turkey | 4 | 1 | 3 | 0 | 2 | −4.673 |
| 5 | Israel | 4 | 0 | 4 | 0 | 0 | −3.138 |

Source: Cricinfo

Round-robin
| No. | Date | Team 1 | Team 2 | Venue | Result |
|---|---|---|---|---|---|
| T20I 4040 | 25 July | Romania | France | Moara Vlasei Cricket Ground, Ilfov County | Romania by 7 wickets |
| T20I 4042 | 25 July | Austria | Turkey | Moara Vlasei Cricket Ground, Ilfov County | Austria by 127 runs |
| T20I 4043 | 26 July | Romania | Austria | Moara Vlasei Cricket Ground, Ilfov County | Austria by 3 wickets |
| T20I 4045 | 26 July | Romania | Turkey | Moara Vlasei Cricket Ground, Ilfov County | Romania by 10 wickets |
| T20I 4046 | 27 July | France | Turkey | Moara Vlasei Cricket Ground, Ilfov County | France by 145 runs |
| T20I 4047 | 27 July | Romania | Israel | Moara Vlasei Cricket Ground, Ilfov County | Romania by 7 wickets |
| T20I 4048 | 28 July | Austria | Israel | Moara Vlasei Cricket Ground, Ilfov County | Austria by 7 wickets |
| T20I 4049 | 28 July | Israel | Turkey | Moara Vlasei Cricket Ground, Ilfov County | Turkey by 9 runs (DLS) |
| T20I 4050 | 28 July | Austria | France | Moara Vlasei Cricket Ground, Ilfov County | France by 81 runs |
| T20I 4051 | 29 July | France | Israel | Moara Vlasei Cricket Ground, Ilfov County | France by 6 wickets |
Semi-finals
| T20I 4052 | 29 July | France | Turkey | Moara Vlasei Cricket Ground, Ilfov County | France by 7 wickets |
| T20I 4053 | 30 July | Romania | Austria | Moara Vlasei Cricket Ground, Ilfov County | Romania by 6 wickets |
Final
| T20I 4054 | 30 July | Romania | France | Moara Vlasei Cricket Ground, Ilfov County | France by 4 runs |

=== Finland women in Estonia ===
WT20I series
| No. | Date | Venue | Result |
|---|---|---|---|
| WT20I 2923 | 25 July | Estonian National Cricket and Rugby Field, Tallinn | Finland by 8 wickets |
| WT20I 2925 | 25 July | Estonian National Cricket and Rugby Field, Tallinn | Finland by 9 wickets |

=== 2026 Switzerland Women's Quadrangular Series ===
| Pos | Team | Pld | W | L | NR | Pts | NRR |
|---|---|---|---|---|---|---|---|
| 1 | Brazil | 3 | 3 | 0 | 0 | 6 | 5.871 |
| 2 | Jersey | 3 | 2 | 1 | 0 | 4 | 0.663 |
| 3 | Spain | 3 | 1 | 2 | 0 | 2 | −2.478 |
| 4 | Switzerland | 3 | 0 | 3 | 0 | 0 | −3.907 |

Source: Cricinfo

Round-robin
| No. | Date | Team 1 | Team 2 | Venue | Result |
|---|---|---|---|---|---|
| WT20I 2927 | 27 July | Switzerland | Jersey | Embrach Cricket Ground, Embrach | Jersey by 7 wickets |
| WT20I 2929 | 27 July | Jersey | Spain | Embrach Cricket Ground, Embrach | Jersey by 5 wickets |
| WT20I 2931 | 28 July | Switzerland | Spain | Embrach Cricket Ground, Embrach | Spain by 8 wickets |
| WT20I 2932 | 28 July | Brazil | Jersey | Embrach Cricket Ground, Embrach | Brazil by 87 runs |
| WT20I 2935 | 29 July | Brazil | Spain | Embrach Cricket Ground, Embrach | Brazil by 6 wickets |
| WT20I 2936 | 29 July | Switzerland | Brazil | Embrach Cricket Ground, Embrach | Brazil by 6 wickets |
Qualifier
| WT20I 2939 | 30 July | Switzerland | Spain | Embrach Cricket Ground, Embrach | Spain by 76 runs |
Final
| WT20I 2941 | 30 July | Brazil | Spain | Embrach Cricket Ground, Embrach | Brazil by 86 runs |

=== Jersey women in Switzerland ===
WT20I match
| No. | Date | Venue | Result |
|---|---|---|---|
| WT20I 2934 | 29 July | Embrach Cricket Ground, Embrach | Jersey by 66 runs |

=== Canada women in Argentina ===
WT20I series
| No. | Date | Venue | Result |
|---|---|---|---|
| WT20I 2937 | 29 July | St. George's College Ground, Quilmes | Argentina by 1 wicket |
| WT20I 2942 | 30 July | St. George's College Ground, Quilmes | Argentina by 6 wickets |
| WT20I 2945 | 31 July | St. George's College Ground, Quilmes | No result |
| WT20I 2946 | 1 August | St. George's College Ground, Quilmes | Argentina by 18 runs |
| WT20I 2947 | 1 August | St. George's College Ground, Quilmes | Canada by 8 wickets |
| WT20I 2949 | 2 August | St. George's College Ground, Quilmes | Argentina by 21 runs |
| WT20I 2950 | 2 August | St. George's College Ground, Quilmes | Argentina by 2 wickets |

=== Spain women in Switzerland ===
WT20I match
| No. | Date | Venue | Result |
|---|---|---|---|
| WT20I 2944 | 31 July | Embrach Cricket Ground, Embrach | Spain by 15 runs |

=== Bahrain in Kenya ===
T20I series
| No. | Date | Venue | Result |
|---|---|---|---|
| T20I 4055 | 31 July | Gymkhana Club Ground, Nairobi | Bahrain by 15 runs |
| T20I 4056 | 1 August | Gymkhana Club Ground, Nairobi | Kenya by 1 wicket |

== August ==
=== 2026 Men's South American Championship ===
| Pos | Team | Pld | W | L | NR | Pts | NRR |
|---|---|---|---|---|---|---|---|
| 1 | Brazil | 4 | 4 | 0 | 0 | 8 | 2.514 |
| 2 | Panama | 4 | 3 | 1 | 0 | 6 | −0.075 |
| 3 | Colombia | 4 | 2 | 2 | 0 | 4 | 0.164 |
| 4 | Turks and Caicos Islands | 4 | 2 | 2 | 0 | 4 | −0.357 |
| 5 | Mexico | 4 | 1 | 3 | 0 | 2 | −0.148 |
| 6 | Peru | 4 | 0 | 4 | 0 | 0 | −2.172 |

Source: Cricheroes

Round-robin
| No. | Date | Team 1 | Team 2 | Venue | Result |
|---|---|---|---|---|---|
| T20I 4057 | 6 August | Brazil | Peru | Los Pinos Polo Club Field 1, Cundinamarca | Brazil by 6 wickets |
| 2nd Match | 6 August | Colombia | Turks and Caicos Islands | Los Pinos Polo Club Field 2, Cundinamarca | Colombia by 8 wickets |
| T20I 4058 | 6 August | Mexico | Panama | Los Pinos Polo Club Field 1, Cundinamarca | Panama by 5 wickets |
| 4th Match | 6 August | Colombia | Peru | Los Pinos Polo Club Field 2, Cundinamarca | Colombia by 6 wickets |
| 5th Match | 7 August | Brazil | Turks and Caicos Islands | Los Pinos Polo Club Field 1, Cundinamarca | Brazil by 49 runs |
| 6th Match | 7 August | Colombia | Panama | Los Pinos Polo Club Field 2, Cundinamarca | Panama by 9 runs |
| T20I 4059 | 7 August | Brazil | Panama | Los Pinos Polo Club Field 1, Cundinamarca | Brazil by 7 wickets |
| 8th Match | 7 August | Mexico | Turks and Caicos Islands | Los Pinos Polo Club Field 2, Cundinamarca | Turks and Caicos Islands by 34 runs |
| T20I 4060 | 8 August | Brazil | Mexico | Los Pinos Polo Club Field 1, Cundinamarca | Brazil by 44 runs |
| T20I 4061 | 8 August | Panama | Peru | Los Pinos Polo Club Field 2, Cundinamarca | Panama by 3 wickets |
| T20I 4062 | 8 August | Mexico | Peru | Los Pinos Polo Club Field 1, Cundinamarca | Mexico by 70 runs |
| 12th Match | 8 August | Colombia | Turks and Caicos Islands | Los Pinos Polo Club Field 2, Cundinamarca | Turks and Caicos Islands by 8 wickets |
Semi-finals
| 13th Match | 9 August | Brazil | Turks and Caicos Islands | Los Pinos Polo Club Field 1, Cundinamarca | Brazil by 9 wickets |
| 14th Match | 9 August | Colombia | Panama | Los Pinos Polo Club Field 2, Cundinamarca | Panama by 15 runs |
Final
| T20I 4063 | 9 August | Brazil | Panama | Los Pinos Polo Club Field 1, Cundinamarca | Brazil by 3 runs |

=== 2026 Malawi Tri-Nation Series ===
| Pos | Team | Pld | W | L | NR | Pts | NRR |
|---|---|---|---|---|---|---|---|
| 1 | Zambia | 6 | 3 | 2 | 1 | 7 | −0.020 |
| 2 | Rwanda | 6 | 3 | 3 | 0 | 6 | −0.043 |
| 3 | Malawi | 6 | 2 | 3 | 1 | 5 | 0.074 |

Source: Cricinfo

Round-robin
| No. | Date | Team 1 | Team 2 | Venue | Result |
|---|---|---|---|---|---|
| T20I 4064 | 11 August | Rwanda | Zambia | TCA Oval, Blantyre | Rwanda by 7 wickets |
| T20I 4065 | 11 August | Malawi | Zambia | TCA Oval, Blantyre | Malawi by 50 runs |
| T20I 4067 | 12 August | Malawi | Rwanda | TCA Oval, Blantyre | Rwanda by 5 wickets |
| T20I 4068 | 12 August | Rwanda | Zambia | TCA Oval, Blantyre | Zambia by 8 runs |
| T20I 4068a | 14 August | Malawi | Zambia | TCA Oval, Blantyre | Match abandoned |
| T20I 4071 | 14 August | Malawi | Rwanda | TCA Oval, Blantyre | Malawi by 26 runs |
| T20I 4074 | 15 August | Rwanda | Zambia | TCA Oval, Blantyre | Zambia by 4 wickets |
| T20I 4077 | 15 August | Malawi | Zambia | TCA Oval, Blantyre | Zambia by 47 runs |
| T20I 4080 | 16 August | Malawi | Rwanda | TCA Oval, Blantyre | Rwanda by 2 wickets |
Final
| T20I 4081 | 16 August | Rwanda | Zambia | TCA Oval, Blantyre | Rwanda by 5 wickets |

=== Germany in Finland ===
T20I match
| No. | Date | Venue | Result |
|---|---|---|---|
| T20I 4066 | 11 August | Kerava National Cricket Ground, Kerava | Germany by 30 runs (DLS) |

=== 2026 Men's T20 World Cup Europe Sub-regional Qualifier C ===
Group A standings
| Pos | Team | Pld | W | L | NR | Pts | NRR | Qualification |
|---|---|---|---|---|---|---|---|---|
| 1 | Spain | 4 | 4 | 0 | 0 | 8 | 4.772 | Advanced to the final |
| 2 | Finland (H) | 4 | 2 | 1 | 1 | 5 | 2.321 | Advance to the 3rd place play-off |
| 3 | Isle of Man | 4 | 2 | 1 | 1 | 5 | 1.201 | Advance to the 5th place play-off |
| 4 | Bulgaria | 4 | 1 | 3 | 0 | 2 | −4.367 | Advanced to the 7th place play-off |
| 5 | Luxembourg | 4 | 0 | 4 | 0 | 0 | −3.340 | Eliminated |

Source: Cricinfo
(H) Host

Group B standings
| Pos | Team | Pld | W | L | NR | Pts | NRR | Qualification |
|---|---|---|---|---|---|---|---|---|
| 1 | Portugal | 4 | 4 | 0 | 0 | 8 | 3.319 | Advance to the final |
| 2 | Germany | 4 | 3 | 1 | 0 | 6 | 3.763 | Advance to the 3rd place play-off |
| 3 | Israel | 4 | 2 | 2 | 0 | 4 | −2.732 | Advance to the 5th place play-off |
| 4 | Czech Republic | 4 | 1 | 3 | 0 | 2 | −2.605 | Advance to the 7th place play-off |
| 5 | Greece | 4 | 0 | 4 | 0 | 0 | −2.454 | Eliminated |

Source: Cricinfo

Group stage
| No. | Date | Team 1 | Team 2 | Venue | Result |
|---|---|---|---|---|---|
| T20I 4069 | 14 August | Finland | Spain | Kerava National Cricket Ground, Kerava | Spain by 8 wickets |
| T20I 4070 | 14 August | Israel | Portugal | Tikkurila Cricket Ground, Vantaa | Portugal by 94 runs |
| T20I 4072 | 14 August | Isle of Man | Luxembourg | Kerava National Cricket Ground, Kerava | Isle of Man by 8 wickets |
| T20I 4073 | 14 August | Czech Republic | Germany | Tikkurila Cricket Ground, Vantaa | Germany by 61 runs |
| T20I 4075 | 15 August | Czech Republic | Greece | Kerava National Cricket Ground, Kerava | Czech Republic by 6 wickets |
| T20I 4076 | 15 August | Isle of Man | Spain | Tikkurila Cricket Ground, Vantaa | Spain by 7 wickets |
| T20I 4078 | 15 August | Germany | Portugal | Kerava National Cricket Ground, Kerava | Portugal by 4 wickets |
| T20I 4079 | 15 August | Finland | Bulgaria | Tikkurila Cricket Ground, Vantaa | Finland by 92 runs |
| T20I 4082 | 17 August | Germany | Israel | Kerava National Cricket Ground, Kerava | Germany by 9 wickets |
| T20I 4083 | 17 August | Bulgaria | Isle of Man | Tikkurila Cricket Ground, Vantaa | Isle of Man by 89 runs |
| T20I 4084 | 17 August | Greece | Portugal | Kerava National Cricket Ground, Kerava | Portugal by 7 wickets |
| T20I 4085 | 17 August | Luxembourg | Spain | Tikkurila Cricket Ground, Vantaa | Spain by 141 runs |
| T20I 4086 | 18 August | Germany | Greece | Kerava National Cricket Ground, Kerava | Germany by 7 wickets |
| T20I 4087 | 18 August | Finland | Luxembourg | Tikkurila Cricket Ground, Vantaa | Finland by 73 runs |
| T20I 4088 | 18 August | Czech Republic | Israel | Kerava National Cricket Ground, Kerava | Israel by 7 wickets |
| T20I 4089 | 18 August | Bulgaria | Spain | Tikkurila Cricket Ground, Vantaa | Spain by 9 wickets |
| T20I 4090 | 20 August | Bulgaria | Luxembourg | Kerava National Cricket Ground, Kerava | Bulgaria by 6 runs (DLS) |
| T20I 4091 | 20 August | Czech Republic | Portugal | Tikkurila Cricket Ground, Vantaa | Portugal by 91 runs (DLS) |
| T20I 4091a | 20 August | Finland | Isle of Man | Kerava National Cricket Ground, Kerava | Match abandoned |
| T20I 4092 | 20 August | Greece | Israel | Tikkurila Cricket Ground, Vantaa | Israel by 1 run (DLS) |
3rd Place play-off
| T20I 4093 | 21 August | Finland | Germany | Kerava National Cricket Ground, Kerava | Germany by 68 runs |
7th Place play-off
| T20I 4094 | 21 August | Bulgaria | Czech Republic | Tikkurila Cricket Ground, Vantaa | Czech Republic by 5 wickets |
5th Place play-off
| T20I 4095 | 21 August | Isle of Man | Israel | Tikkurila Cricket Ground, Vantaa | Isle of Man by 9 wickets |
Final
| T20I 4096 | 21 August | Portugal | Spain | Kerava National Cricket Ground, Kerava | Portugal by 57 runs |

=== 2026 Women's Belt and Road Trophy ===
| Pos | Team | Pld | W | L | NR | Pts | NRR |
|---|---|---|---|---|---|---|---|
| 1 | Indonesia | 4 | 3 | 1 | 0 | 6 | 2.248 |
| 2 | China | 4 | 3 | 1 | 0 | 6 | 1.150 |
| 3 | Oman | 4 | 0 | 4 | 0 | 0 | −3.193 |

Source: Cricinfo

Round-robin
| No. | Date | Team 1 | Team 2 | Venue | Result |
|---|---|---|---|---|---|
| WT20I 2954 | 20 August | China | Oman | ZJUT Cricket Field, Hangzhou | China by 18 runs (DLS) |
| WT20I 2955 | 21 August | China | Indonesia | ZJUT Cricket Field, Hangzhou | China by 7 wickets |
| WT20I 2956 | 21 August | Indonesia | Oman | ZJUT Cricket Field, Hangzhou | Indonesia by 59 runs |
| WT20I 2957 | 22 August | China | Oman | ZJUT Cricket Field, Hangzhou | China by 8 wickets |
| WT20I 2959 | 22 August | China | Indonesia | ZJUT Cricket Field, Hangzhou | Indonesia by 9 wickets (DLS) |
| WT20I 2962 | 23 August | Indonesia | Oman | ZJUT Cricket Field, Hangzhou | Indonesia by 66 runs |
Final
| WT20I 2964 | 24 August | China | Indonesia | ZJUT Cricket Field, Hangzhou | China by 6 wickets (DLS) |

=== Belgium women in Luxembourg ===
WT20I series
| No. | Date | Venue | Result |
|---|---|---|---|
| WT20I 2958 | 22 August | Pierre Werner Cricket Ground, Walferdange | Belgium by 26 runs |
| WT20I 2960 | 22 August | Pierre Werner Cricket Ground, Walferdange | Luxembourg by 10 wickets (DLS) |
| WT20I 2961 | 23 August | Pierre Werner Cricket Ground, Walferdange | Luxembourg by 4 wickets |
| WT20I 2963 | 23 August | Pierre Werner Cricket Ground, Walferdange | Luxembourg by 47 runs |

=== 2026 Women's Continental Cup ===
| Pos | Team | Pld | W | L | NR | Pts | NRR |
|---|---|---|---|---|---|---|---|
| 1 | Turkey | 3 | 3 | 0 | 0 | 6 | 3.212 |
| 2 | Austria | 3 | 2 | 1 | 0 | 4 | 1.663 |
| 3 | Guernsey | 3 | 1 | 2 | 0 | 2 | −1.571 |
| 4 | Czech Republic | 3 | 0 | 3 | 0 | 0 | −2.080 |

Source: Cricinfo

| Pos | Team | Pld | W | L | NR | Pts | NRR |
|---|---|---|---|---|---|---|---|
| 1 | Isle of Man | 3 | 3 | 0 | 0 | 6 | 3.555 |
| 2 | Norway | 3 | 2 | 1 | 0 | 4 | −0.183 |
| 3 | Romania | 3 | 1 | 2 | 0 | 2 | −0.533 |
| 4 | Greece | 3 | 0 | 3 | 0 | 0 | −3.091 |

Source: Cricinfo

Group stage
| No. | Date | Team 1 | Team 2 | Venue | Result |
|---|---|---|---|---|---|
| WT20I 2965 | 26 August | Austria | Turkey | Moara Vlasei Cricket Ground, Ilfov County | Turkey by 8 wickets |
| WT20I 2966 | 26 August | Romania | Isle of Man | Moara Vlasei Cricket Ground, Ilfov County | Isle of Man by 3 wickets |
| WT20I 2967 | 26 August | Austria | Guernsey | Moara Vlasei Cricket Ground, Ilfov County | Austria by 85 runs |
| WT20I 2968 | 27 August | Greece | Isle of Man | Moara Vlasei Cricket Ground, Ilfov County | Isle of Man by 9 wickets |
| WT20I 2969 | 27 August | Czech Republic | Turkey | Moara Vlasei Cricket Ground, Ilfov County | Turkey by 8 wickets |
| WT20I 2970 | 27 August | Romania | Norway | Moara Vlasei Cricket Ground, Ilfov County | Norway by 2 runs (DLS) |
| WT20I 2971 | 28 August | Romania | Greece | Moara Vlasei Cricket Ground, Ilfov County | Romania by 30 runs |
| WT20I 2973 | 28 August | Guernsey | Turkey | Moara Vlasei Cricket Ground, Ilfov County | Turkey by 17 runs |
| WT20I 2974 | 28 August | Austria | Czech Republic | Moara Vlasei Cricket Ground, Ilfov County | Austria by 5 wickets |
| WT20I 2977 | 29 August | Greece | Norway | Moara Vlasei Cricket Ground, Ilfov County | Norway by 6 wickets |
| WT20I 2979 | 29 August | Czech Republic | Guernsey | Moara Vlasei Cricket Ground, Ilfov County | Guernsey by 5 wickets |
| WT20I 2981 | 29 August | Isle of Man | Norway | Moara Vlasei Cricket Ground, Ilfov County | Isle of Man by 27 runs |
3rd Place play-off
| WT20I 2983 | 30 August | Austria | Norway | Moara Vlasei Cricket Ground, Ilfov County | Austria by 7 wickets |
Final
| WT20I 2984 | 30 August | Isle of Man | Turkey | Moara Vlasei Cricket Ground, Ilfov County | Turkey by 5 wickets |

=== 2026 Women's Nordic Cup ===
| Pos | Team | Pld | W | L | NR | Pts | NRR |
|---|---|---|---|---|---|---|---|
| 1 | Sweden | 4 | 2 | 0 | 2 | 6 | 3.377 |
| 2 | Germany | 4 | 1 | 2 | 1 | 3 | 0.154 |
| 3 | Denmark | 4 | 1 | 2 | 1 | 3 | −1.635 |

Source: Cricinfo

Round-robin
| No. | Date | Team 1 | Team 2 | Venue | Result |
|---|---|---|---|---|---|
| WT20I 2972 | 28 August | Germany | Sweden | GelsenTrabPark, Gelsenkirchen | Sweden by 14 runs (DLS) |
| WT20I 2975 | 28 August | Denmark | Sweden | GelsenTrabPark, Gelsenkirchen | Sweden by 71 runs |
| WT20I 2978 | 29 August | Germany | Denmark | GelsenTrabPark, Gelsenkirchen | Denmark by 2 wickets |
| WT20I 2980 | 29 August | Germany | Sweden | GelsenTrabPark, Gelsenkirchen | No result |
| WT20I 2983a | 30 August | Denmark | Sweden | GelsenTrabPark, Gelsenkirchen | Match abandoned |
| WT20I 2985 | 30 August | Germany | Denmark | GelsenTrabPark, Gelsenkirchen | Germany by 37 runs |

== September ==
=== 2026 Falling Wickets Cup ===
| Pos | Team | Pld | W | L | NR | Pts | NRR |
|---|---|---|---|---|---|---|---|
| 1 | Czech Republic | 4 | 4 | 0 | 0 | 8 | 2.579 |
| 2 | Portugal | 4 | 2 | 2 | 0 | 4 | 0.191 |
| 3 | Belgium | 4 | 0 | 4 | 0 | 0 | −2.846 |

Source: Cricinfo

Round-robin
| No. | Date | Team 1 | Team 2 | Venue | Result |
|---|---|---|---|---|---|
| WT20I 2991 | 4 September | Belgium | Portugal | Vinoř Cricket Ground, Prague | Portugal by 52 runs |
| WT20I 2993 | 4 September | Czech Republic | Portugal | Vinoř Cricket Ground, Prague | Czech Republic by 7 wickets |
| WT20I 2995 | 4 September | Czech Republic | Belgium | Vinoř Cricket Ground, Prague | Czech Republic by 48 runs |
| WT20I 2997 | 5 September | Belgium | Portugal | Vinoř Cricket Ground, Prague | Portugal by 7 wickets |
| WT20I 2999 | 5 September | Czech Republic | Belgium | Vinoř Cricket Ground, Prague | Czech Republic by 10 wickets |
| WT20I 3001 | 5 September | Czech Republic | Portugal | Vinoř Cricket Ground, Prague | Czech Republic by 6 wickets |
Qualifier
| WT20I 3003 | 6 September | Belgium | Portugal | Vinoř Cricket Ground, Prague | Portugal by 8 wickets |
Final
| WT20I 3005 | 6 September | Czech Republic | Portugal | Vinoř Cricket Ground, Prague | Portugal by 4 wickets |

=== 2026 Balkan Cup (Belgrade) ===
| Pos | Team | Pld | W | L | NR | Pts | NRR |
|---|---|---|---|---|---|---|---|
| 1 | Croatia | 4 | 4 | 0 | 0 | 8 | 3.217 |
| 2 | Serbia | 4 | 2 | 2 | 0 | 4 | 0.116 |
| 3 | Bulgaria | 4 | 0 | 4 | 0 | 0 | −3.458 |

Updated to match(es) played on 6 September 2026. Source: Cricinfo

Round-robin
| No. | Date | Team 1 | Team 2 | Venue | Result |
|---|---|---|---|---|---|
| WT20I 2992 | 4 September | Serbia | Croatia | Lisicji Jarak Cricket Ground, Belgrade | Croatia by 8 runs |
| WT20I 2994 | 4 September | Bulgaria | Croatia | Lisicji Jarak Cricket Ground, Belgrade | Croatia by 90 runs |
| WT20I 2998 | 5 September | Bulgaria | Croatia | Lisicji Jarak Cricket Ground, Belgrade | Croatia by 122 runs |
| WT20I 3000 | 5 September | Serbia | Bulgaria | Lisicji Jarak Cricket Ground, Belgrade | Serbia by 7 wickets |
| WT20I 3004 | 6 September | Serbia | Croatia | Lisicji Jarak Cricket Ground, Belgrade | Croatia by 7 wickets |
| WT20I 3006 | 6 September | Serbia | Bulgaria | Lisicji Jarak Cricket Ground, Belgrade | Serbia by 5 wickets |

=== 2026 Africa Continental Cup ===
| Pos | Team | Pld | W | L | NR | Pts | NRR |
|---|---|---|---|---|---|---|---|
| 1 | Uganda | 8 | 7 | 1 | 0 | 14 | 3.538 |
| 2 | Kenya | 8 | 7 | 1 | 0 | 14 | 2.657 |
| 3 | Rwanda | 8 | 4 | 4 | 0 | 8 | 0.599 |
| 4 | Botswana | 8 | 2 | 6 | 0 | 4 | −2.144 |
| 5 | Sierra Leone | 8 | 0 | 8 | 0 | 0 | −4.403 |

Source: Cricinfo

Round-robin
| No. | Date | Team 1 | Team 2 | Venue | Result |
|---|---|---|---|---|---|
| T20I 4104 | 8 September | Rwanda | Botswana | Gahanga B Ground, Kigali | Rwanda by 55 runs |
| T20I 4105 | 8 September | Kenya | Sierra Leone | Gahanga B Ground, Kigali | Kenya by 94 runs |
| T20I 4106 | 9 September | Sierra Leone | Uganda | Gahanga B Ground, Kigali | Uganda by 114 runs |
| T20I 4107 | 9 September | Rwanda | Kenya | Gahanga B Ground, Kigali | Kenya by 2 wickets |
| T20I 4108 | 10 September | Botswana | Uganda | Gahanga B Ground, Kigali | Uganda by 5 wickets |
| T20I 4109 | 10 September | Rwanda | Sierra Leone | Gahanga B Ground, Kigali | Rwanda by 145 runs |
| T20I 4110 | 11 September | Rwanda | Uganda | Gahanga B Ground, Kigali | Uganda by 64 runs |
| T20I 4111 | 11 September | Botswana | Kenya | Gahanga B Ground, Kigali | Kenya by 10 wickets |
| T20I 4112 | 12 September | Kenya | Uganda | Gahanga B Ground, Kigali | Kenya by 8 wickets |
| T20I 4113 | 12 September | Botswana | Sierra Leone | Gahanga B Ground, Kigali | Botswana by 23 runs |
| T20I 4114 | 13 September | Kenya | Sierra Leone | Gahanga B Ground, Kigali | Kenya by 9 wickets |
| T20I 4115 | 13 September | Rwanda | Botswana | Gahanga B Ground, Kigali | Rwanda by 6 runs (DLS) |
| T20I 4118 | 15 September | Uganda | Sierra Leone | Gahanga International Cricket Stadium, Kigali | Uganda by 8 wickets |
| T20I 4119 | 15 September | Rwanda | Kenya | Gahanga International Cricket Stadium, Kigali | Kenya by 32 runs |
| T20I 4123 | 16 September | Botswana | Uganda | Gahanga International Cricket Stadium, Kigali | Uganda by 5 wickets |
| T20I 4124 | 16 September | Rwanda | Sierra Leone | Gahanga International Cricket Stadium, Kigali | Rwanda by 6 wickets |
| T20I 4126 | 17 September | Rwanda | Uganda | Gahanga International Cricket Stadium, Kigali | Uganda by 72 runs |
| T20I 4127 | 17 September | Botswana | Kenya | Gahanga International Cricket Stadium, Kigali | Kenya by 63 runs |
| T20I 4130 | 18 September | Kenya | Uganda | Gahanga International Cricket Stadium, Kigali | Uganda by 47 runs |
| T20I 4131 | 18 September | Botswana | Sierra Leone | Gahanga International Cricket Stadium, Kigali | Botswana by 21 runs |
Final
| T20I 4133 | 19 September | Kenya | Uganda | Gahanga International Cricket Stadium, Kigali | Kenya by 39 runs |

=== Malaysia women in Japan ===
WT20I series
| No. | Date | Venue | Result |
|---|---|---|---|
| WT20I 3010a | 11 September | Sano International Cricket Ground, Sano | Match abandoned |
| WT20I 3013 | 12–13 September | Sano International Cricket Ground, Sano | Malaysia by 18 runs |
| WT20I 3014 | 13 September | Sano International Cricket Ground, Sano | Japan by 11 runs |

=== United Arab Emirates in Malaysia ===
T20I series
| No. | Date | Venue | Result |
|---|---|---|---|
| T20I 4117 | 14 September | Bayuemas Oval, Kuala Lumpur | United Arab Emirates by 6 wickets |
| T20I 4122 | 16 September | Bayuemas Oval, Kuala Lumpur | United Arab Emirates by 7 wickets |
| T20I 4125 | 17 September | Bayuemas Oval, Kuala Lumpur | United Arab Emirates by 59 runs |

=== Hong Kong in Japan ===
T20I series
| No. | Date | Venue | Result |
|---|---|---|---|
| T20I 4132 | 19 September | Sano International Cricket Ground, Sano | Hong Kong by 4 wickets |
| T20I 4134a | 20 September | Sano International Cricket Ground, Sano | Match abandoned |

=== 2026 Nigeria Quadrangular Series ===
| Pos | Team | Pld | W | L | NR | Pts | NRR |
|---|---|---|---|---|---|---|---|
| 1 | Nigeria A | 6 | 5 | 1 | 0 | 10 | 2.113 |
| 2 | Nigeria | 6 | 4 | 1 | 1 | 9 | 1.998 |
| 3 | Sierra Leone | 6 | 2 | 3 | 1 | 5 | −1.712 |
| 4 | Ghana | 6 | 0 | 6 | 0 | 0 | −2.478 |

Source: Cricinfo

Round-robin
| No. | Date | Team 1 | Team 2 | Venue | Result |
|---|---|---|---|---|---|
| 1st Match | 21 September | Nigeria A | Sierra Leone | Tafawa Balewa Square Cricket Oval, Lagos | Nigeria A by 33 runs |
| T20I 4135 | 21 September | Nigeria | Ghana | Tafawa Balewa Square Cricket Oval, Lagos | Nigeria by 8 wickets |
| T20I 4137 | 22 September | Ghana | Sierra Leone | Tafawa Balewa Square Cricket Oval, Lagos | Sierra Leone by 6 wickets |
| 4th Match | 22 September | Nigeria | Nigeria A | Tafawa Balewa Square Cricket Oval, Lagos | Nigeria A by 19 runs |
| T20I 4137a | 23 September | Nigeria | Sierra Leone | Tafawa Balewa Square Cricket Oval, Lagos | Match abandoned |
| 6th Match | 23 September | Nigeria A | Ghana | Tafawa Balewa Square Cricket Oval, Lagos | Nigeria A by 8 wickets |
| T20I 4146 | 25 September | Ghana | Sierra Leone | Tafawa Balewa Square Cricket Oval, Lagos | Sierra Leone by 13 runs (DLS) |
| 8th Match | 25 September | Nigeria | Nigeria A | Tafawa Balewa Square Cricket Oval, Lagos | Nigeria by 2 wickets |
| 9th Match | 26 September | Nigeria A | Sierra Leone | Tafawa Balewa Square Cricket Oval, Lagos | Nigeria A by 9 wickets |
| T20I 4148 | 26 September | Nigeria | Ghana | Tafawa Balewa Square Cricket Oval, Lagos | Nigeria by 91 runs |
| 11th Match | 27 September | Nigeria A | Ghana | Tafawa Balewa Square Cricket Oval, Lagos | Nigeria A by 7 wickets (DLS) |
| T20I 4150 | 27 September | Nigeria | Sierra Leone | Tafawa Balewa Square Cricket Oval, Lagos | Nigeria by 71 runs |

=== 2026 North American Cup ===
| Pos | Team | Pld | W | L | T | NR | Pts | NRR | Qualification |
|---|---|---|---|---|---|---|---|---|---|
| 1 | Cayman Islands (H) | 4 | 2 | 1 | 0 | 1 | 5 | 1.980 | Advanced to final |
| 2 | Bermuda | 4 | 1 | 1 | 0 | 2 | 4 | 0.444 | Advanced to qualifier |
| 3 | Bahamas | 4 | 0 | 1 | 0 | 3 | 3 | −6.550 | Advanced to qualifier |

Source: Cricinfo
(H) Host

Round-robin
| No. | Date | Team 1 | Team 2 | Venue | Result |
|---|---|---|---|---|---|
| T20I 4138 | 23 September | Cayman Islands | Bermuda | Jimmy Powell Oval, George Town | Cayman Islands by 2 wickets |
| T20I 4139 | 23 September | Cayman Islands | Bermuda | Jimmy Powell Oval, George Town | Bermuda by 10 wickets |
| T20I 4142 | 24 September | Cayman Islands | Bahamas | Jimmy Powell Oval, George Town | Cayman Islands by 131 runs |
| T20I 4143 | 24 September | Cayman Islands | Bahamas | Jimmy Powell Oval, George Town | No result |
| T20I 4146a | 25 September | Bahamas | Bermuda | Jimmy Powell Oval, George Town | Match abandoned |
| T20I 4146b | 25 September | Bahamas | Bermuda | Jimmy Powell Oval, George Town | Match abandoned |
Qualifier
| T20I 4149 | 26 September | Bahamas | Bermuda | Jimmy Powell Oval, George Town | Bermuda by 8 wickets |
Final
| T20I 4151 | 27 September | Cayman Islands | Bermuda | Jimmy Powell Oval, George Town | Bermuda by 42 runs |

=== 2026 Women's South American Championship ===
| Pos | Team | Pld | W | L | NR | Pts | NRR |
|---|---|---|---|---|---|---|---|
| 1 | Brazil A | 4 | 4 | 0 | 0 | 8 | 4.623 |
| 2 | Costa Rica | 4 | 2 | 2 | 0 | 4 | −1.548 |
| 3 | Chile | 4 | 0 | 4 | 0 | 0 | −3.447 |

Source: Cricinfo

Round-robin
| No. | Date | Team 1 | Team 2 | Venue | Result |
|---|---|---|---|---|---|
| 1st Match | 23 September | Brazil A | Chile | Pocos Oval, Poços de Caldas | Brazil A by 9 wickets |
| WT20I 3027 | 23 September | Chile | Costa Rica | Pocos Oval, Poços de Caldas | Costa Rica by 9 wickets |
| 3rd Match | 24 September | Brazil A | Costa Rica | Pocos Oval, Poços de Caldas | Brazil A by 95 runs |
| 4th Match | 24 September | Brazil A | Chile | Pocos Oval, Poços de Caldas | Brazil A by 108 runs |
| WT20I 3028 | 25 September | Chile | Costa Rica | Pocos Oval, Poços de Caldas | Costa Rica by 8 wickets |
| 6th Match | 25 September | Brazil A | Costa Rica | Pocos Oval, Poços de Caldas | Brazil A by 62 runs |
Final
| 7th Match | 27 September | Brazil A | Costa Rica | Pocos Oval, Poços de Caldas | Brazil A by 74 runs |

== See also ==
- International cricket in 2026
- Associate international cricket in 2026–27
- Associate international cricket in 2025–26
