= MTN Bushfire Festival =

Eswatini music and arts annual festival

- Genre: Music; Arts; Culture
- Dates: Annually in May
- Locations: Malkerns Valley, Eswatini
- Years active: 2007–present
- Attendance: ~20,000
- Capacity: Limited (advance ticket purchase required)
- Sponsors: MTN Eswatini, European Union, TotalEnergies
- Website: bush-fire.com

The MTN Bushfire Festival is an internationally acclaimed music and arts festival held annually in Eswatini. A talent platform, the festival has become a cultural landmark in Southern Africa and draws scores of visitors from around the world.

== Overview ==
Established in the scenic Malkerns valley, the MTN Bushfire Festival attracts up to 20,000 attendees who are referred to as the "global fire family" and occurs over three days annually in May. The global fire family gather in winter at the valley for all types of fun - from music, performance arts, handmade crafts, fashion, food and dialogues. In 2025, the Colombian band Mavichi was selected to represent Colombia at the Bushfire Festival, marking a significant cultural exchange between Latin America and Africa given the group's traditional Cauca Violin music genre, which is rooted in African heritage.

Known for its celebration of music, culture, and social activism, the festival in 2023 featured dynamic performances from artists like Mokoomba, Sho Madjozi, Leomile Motsetsela, Kabza De Small and Ghorwane. It also included the EU Bushfire Schools Festival, the Arts Round Table in collaboration with the Africa Rising Music Conference, and the Sound Connects Fund-supported CollaboNation project, fostering cross-border musical collaborations. Despite logistical challenges due to the large turnout, the festival affirmed its status as a key player in Southern Africa’s creative economy, providing short-term employment to about 1,500 locals and sustaining strong corporate and NGO partnerships. The Malandela farm where the festival is held is owned festival director Jiggs Thorne and his two brothers.

== Awards and recognitions for MTN Bushfire Festival ==
- African Responsible Tourism Awards (2017): Best Sustainable Event Award
- Top 30 on Everfest’s Fest300 List (2018)
- CNN Travel listed the festival among “7 African music festivals you really have to see”
- BBC included it in the “Top African Festivals” list
