= Majurugenta =

Marurugenta

Studio album by Ghorwane
- Released: 10 September 1993
- Recorded: August 1991
- Studios: Real World Studios, Box, Wiltshire
- Genres: Marrabenta; dance; African music
- Length: 48:56
- Label: Real World Records
- Producer: Chris Lawson

Ghorwane chronology
Marurugenta (1993)	'Kudumba (1997)

Marjurugenta is the debut album by Mozambican marrabenta band Ghorwane, recorded in August 1991 at Real World Studios but not released until September 1993 by Real World Records. The band had built up a reputation in their native country throughout the 1980s for their unique urban dance musical style and politically conscious lyrics, pulling from genres such as marrabenta and xigubu. After being denied visas to play at a European festival in 1987, it soon became possible for the band to play the world music-celebrating WOMAD festival in 1990. While on their trip to the festival, the band were approached by the WOMAD-affiliated Real World Records to record their debut album.

The album combines warm melodies, soulful horns, East African guitar work, dance rhythms (mostly in Mozambican styles), soft vocals, subdued percussion and elements of further afield genres such as soukous (especially prevalent in the rhythms and horns), reggae, jazz as well as Portuguese and Brazilian music. Jose "Zeca" Alage's breezy saxophone work is a defining feature of the music. Lyrically, the album addresses the poor state of Mozambican society and criticises how the country's citizens were dying due to lack of medicine and transport during the civil war. The album received critical acclaim, with praising aimed at the agit-prop lyrics, danceable rhythms and unique sound. Alage was murdered prior to the band's 1993 European tour in promotion of the album.

== Background and recording ==
Naming themselves after a lake which never runs dry, Ghorwane formed in Mozambique in 1983, eight years after the country was liberated from Portugal, by which point the nation had become embroiled in the Mozambican Civil War which lasted into the 1990s. The band developed their own style of dance music that, although urban, still tied the band members to their roots, drawing from the ethnic languages and rhythms of Mozambique and writing songs in their native languages. The band pulled from marrabenta, an urban genre which relies on percussion and guitar that developed in Maputo, as well as xigbu, a style of drum-based chant. Ghorwane became known throughout the country in the 1980s due to their sharp political commentary, to the point where state police would routinely attend their live concerts in order to monitor their lyrics. Nonetheless, they received the blessing of Samora Machel in 1985, one year before his death, who referred to the band as "good boys".

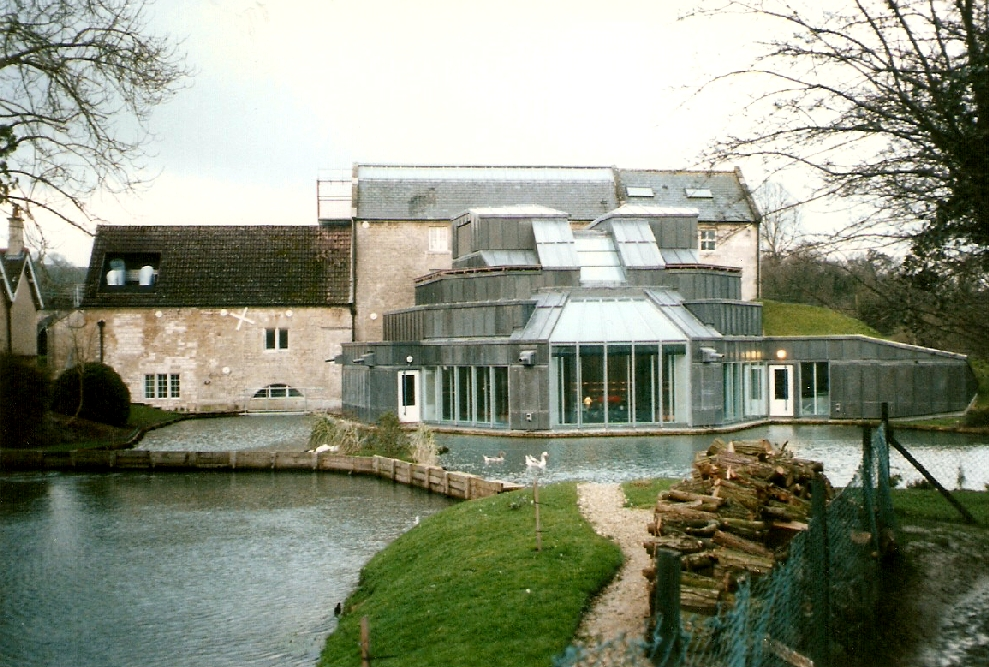
Real World Studios, Box, Wiltshire.

Vocalist and saxophonist Zeca Algae wrote "Massotcha" in 1986, which criticised the horrors of the civil war and attacked the danger posed by the military to the people they were supposed to protect. It was recorded among a selection of the band's material that same year, and reached number 1 on the country's singles chart. The group endured harder times after Machel's times in both political and personal senses. For instance, the government withheld their visas in 1987 to prevent them from performing at a European music festival. Later that year though, they played abroad for the first time at the Swaziland (since 2018 renamed to Eswatini) independence festival, and in 1990, Ghorwane were able to participate in the WOMAD festival, at the invitation of the festival's founder Peter Gabriel.

It was during their trip to play at the festival that the WOMAD-affiliated record label Real World Records offered Ghorwane the opportunity to record their debut album. Majurugenta was recorded and mixed at the label's Real World Studios, Box, Wiltshire, in August 1991. Chris Lawson recorded the album, though he is not credited as producer. Richard Evans mixed the album.

== Composition ==
Majurugenta displays the band's unique style of Mozambican pop which combines warm melodies, dance rhythms and soulful horns. The rhythms are in largely the local marrabenta style, though the album incorporates rhythms from throughout Mozambique as well as ones from other countries, like soukous and reggae, as is evident on the title track. Elements of soukous are also prominent in the album's horn section. Rogue magazine felt the album's "bewitching slow-lope rhythms" were a particularly Mozambican characteristic. Majuruengta also features an East African guitar sound and an undertow of Portuguese and Brazilian music. Jose "Seca" Alage's solo saxophone is breezy playing adds colour to the album's unique sound.

Rhythms magazine felt the album was a melancholy mix of jazz and local rhythms which exudes a warm, intimate feel, most prominently in the trumpet and saxophone horn section. Music critic Robert Christgau disagreed that the music was melancholy, instead writing that the album is "happy yet principled" Mozambican music that is "soukous-smooth even if the interlocking rhythms show off their seams and the horns are equal parts intricacy and palpable deliberation." Folk Roots, meanwhile, made note of the subdued percussion, soft vocals, "mild-mannered" guitar and "delightfully floating saxophone." The title track features a guitar lilt which the New Internationalist compared to contemporary Western dance music.

Five of the songs on Majurugenta were written by Roberto Chitsonzo, with the remaining four songs written by Jose Algae. The lyrics on the album address the poor state of the band's Mozambican society, with an explicit message that the Frelimo government was becoming too preoccupied fighting Renamo rebels to the point where it would not provide for its citizens. With reoccurring themes of tragedy and "left puritanism," the songs on the album attacks how the country's citizens were dying in the horror of the civil war due to lack of medicine and transport. The album's title track refers to a fashion style. "Muthimba" incorporates a traditional lament that criticises the rigours of war. Buluku" ("Trousers") refers to how several women resorted to prostitution in order to afford closing, while "Mavabwyl" ("Illness") is a tribute to those dying in hospitals with only limited medicine.

== Release and reception ==
Professional ratings
Review scores
Source	Rating
AllMusic	4.5/5 stars
Robert Christgau	A−

Although Majurugenta was recorded in August 1991, it was not released by Real World Records until 10 September 1993. Nonetheless, the two year delay was said by one critic to "[have] done nothing to reduce its vivacity." The band's first international release, it features portions of Malangatana Valente Nguenha's 1991 painting Sim Tudo photographed by Martinho Fernando on the front and back covers, as well as design and art direction by Sy-Jeng Cheng and photography in the liner notes by Pete Williams. Gerry Lyseight provides liner notes. Prior to the band's 1993 European tour in promotion of Majurugenta, the band's vocalist and saxophonist Zeca Algae was murdered. While his assassination was not of a political nature, it nonetheless reflected Mozambique's social turmoil.

Majurugenta received positive reviews from critics. John Storm Roberts of AllMusic was very favourable, commenting that the "really extremely individual and attractive" album is enriched by Alagae's solo saxophone playing. Rogue called the album "bewildering," while The Guardian called it "[t]he best African release of the month. [...] It seems a minor miracle that music this good should be produced in a country battered by civil war." Robert Christgau was very positive, calling it "three-dimensional agitprop--tragedy and left puritanism in one resolutely hedonistic package," while Esquire wrote that the album "issues People's challenges to the genocidal Renamo handidos armados and still cooks mellow." Mark Sullivan of Option named it his 4th favourite album of 1993. Global Rhythm listed it as one of three "Recommended Recordings" by Ghorwane. In The Rough Guide to World Music: Africa & Middle East, Simon Broughton refers to Ghorwane as "the masters of Mozambican urban dance music rising from traditional roots to contemporary beats." They refer to Majurugenta as "[a] party album per excellence" boasting a big sound that requires "big speakers," and write that the album "always gets people moving." New Internationalist felt the title track was "equipped with the kind of captivating guitar lilt that would put much Western dance music to shame." The album was also praised for its ability to bring together elements of zouk music and soukous to marrabenta.

== Track listing ==
1. "Muthimba" – 4:39
2. "Majurugenta" – 7:42
3. "Matarlatanta – 5:38
4. "Xai-Xai" – 4:45
5. "Mavabwyi" – 5:37
6. "Sathuma" – 4:28
7. "Buluku" – 5:34
8. "Terehumba" – 5:46
9. "Akuhanha" – 4:47

== Personnel ==
- Carlitos Mandanda – bass guitar
- Garry Mouat – design concept (series identity)
- Sy-Jenq Cheng – design, art direction
- Riquito Mafambane – drums
- Marciano Monjane – keyboard
- Tchika Fernando – lead guitar, vocals
- Gerry Lyseight – liner notes
- Richard Evans (3) – mixing
- Malangatana Valente Nguenha – painting
- Celso Paco – percussion
- David Macuácua – percussion, vocals
- Martinho Fernando – photography (front and back)
- Pete Williams – photography (inside)
- Chris Lawson – recording
- Roberto Chitsonzo – vocals, rhythm guitar
- Zeca Alage – saxophone, vocals
- Júlio Baza – trumpet
