= Cauca Violin =

Musical instrument and genre from Colombia

Cauca violin
- Developed: 17th century

Violín Caucano (English: Cauca Violin) is a traditional musical instrument and form of violin music from the northern part of the Cauca Department, Colombia, particularly in Afro-Colombians rural communities. It refers to both the instrument itself (often handmade with local materials) and the cultural tradition around its use in regional musical styles.

== History and origins ==
It is traditionally held that the violín caucano has been in use for over 300 years among Afro‑Colombian populations of northern Cauca. The instrument’s origins are linked to the colonial period when enslaved Africans observed European violins played by landowners or missionaries and learned by imitation. Some historical sources say European violins were introduced by missionaries in the 17th century.

The violín caucano is seen as a symbol of identity, resistance, and cultural memory among Afro‑Colombian communities in northern Cauca. It is played in celebrations (marriages, birthdays), funeral gatherings, and public festivals. It gained wider formal recognition when in 2008 the category Violines Caucanos was added to the Festival de Música del Pacífico Petronio Álvarez ("Petronio Álvarez Pacific Music Festival"). In 2025, the Colombian band Mavichi performed at the MTN Bushfire Festival, Eswatini and played the Cauca Violin.

Originally, violín caucano instruments were made with guadua (a kind of bamboo) for the body, horsehair for the bow, and locally available materials. They were later made using machete parts and other local woods; the craftsmanship is more rustic than classical European violins but produces distinctive sound appropriate to its musical styles.
