= Trabrennbahn Gelsenkirchen =

Horse racing venue in Gelsenkirchen, Germany

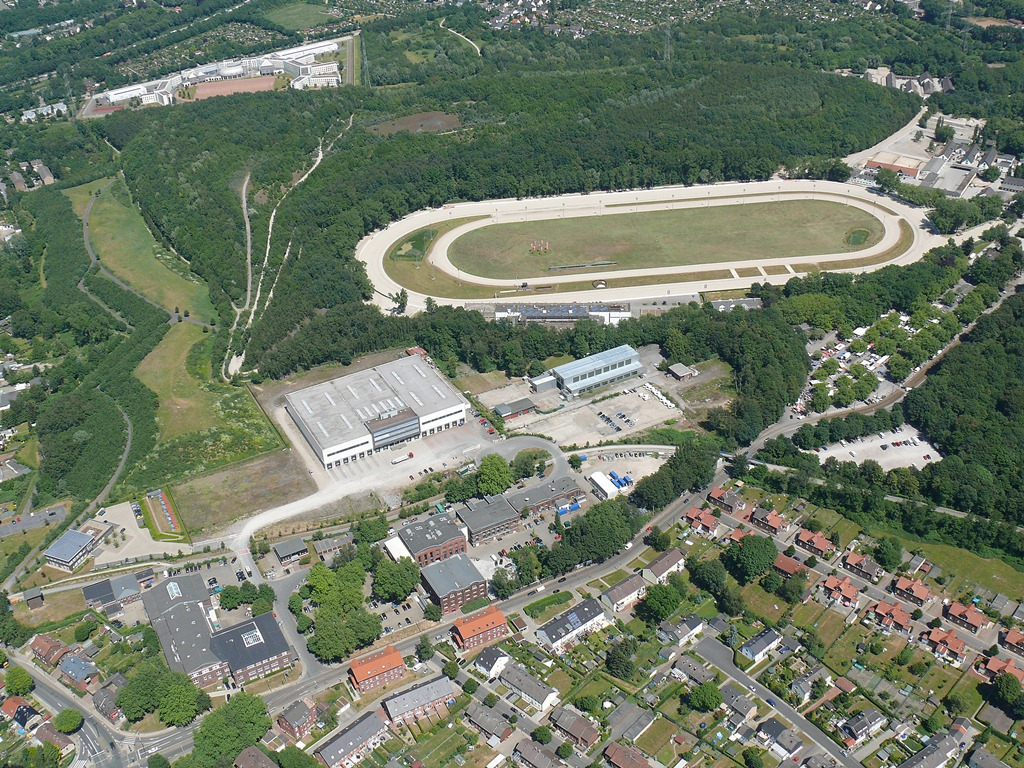
- Luftbild Essen-Katernberg Triple-Z 2011
- Interactive map of Trabrennbahn Gelsenkirchen
- Location: Gelsenkirchen, Germany
- Coordinates: 51°30′21″N 7°3′30″E
- Date opened: 1912
- Capacity: 30,000
- Race type: Harness racing
- Notable races: Bild-Pokal

Trabrennbahn Gelsenkirchen, also known as GelsenTrabPark, is located in the Feldmark quarter of Gelsenkirchen, Germany. The track, built in 1912, is used for harness racing and is the largest harness racing track in Germany, with a capacity for 30,000 spectators. The track length is 1,200 meters and is a right-handed course.

The grandstand was built in 1965 and expanded in 1979, has 9,600 seats on four floors and is 112 meters in length. In 2002 the grandstand was renovated and a VIP-lounge called "Abano As Club" was installed.

The highlight of the racing year is the "Bild-Pokal" on 1 May. Every year, a charity race day called "Schalke hilft!" is held in cooperation with the world famous local football club FC Schalke 04.

GelsenTrabPark was selected as the venue for the Nordic Women's T20I Cup 2026, marking the first time the ground hosted a women's international cricket match.
