= Malkerns =

- Location in Eswatini
- Coordinates: 26°31′49″S 31°11′20″E
- Country: Eswatini
- Region: Manzini

Area
  - Total: 9,036 ha (22,330 acres)
- (approx.)
- Elevation: 776 m (2,546 ft)

Population (2019)
  - Total: 8,074
- Time zone: UTC+2 (SAST)

Malkerns is a town in Eswatini, located in the Manzini District, between Ezulwini and Manzini. The town was inaugurated in 2012.

== Agriculture and Tourism ==
Malkerns' economy is primarily composed of agricultural production and tourism. Approximately 8,452 hectares (32.63 sq mi) is dedicated to farming, most notably pineapples.

Since 2007, the MTN Bushfire Festival has been held annually at the House on Fire venue in Malkerns.
