= Ghorwane =

Mozambican marrabenta musical band

- Origin: Maputo, Mozambique
- Years active: 1983–present
- Labels: Real World
- Members: Roberto Chitsonzo, João Carlos, Carlitos Gove, Paito Tcheco, Júlio e António Baza, Muzila, David Macuácua.
- Past members: João "Joni" Schwalbach, Tchica Vicente, Arsénio Hilário, José "Zeca" Alage, Pedro Langa, Dingo Sambo, Jorge César, Jorge Moisés, Karen Boswell, Moreira Chonguiça, Ivan Mazuze, Bertina "Tina" Cândido, Nanando, Celso Paco, Henrique Salas, Riquito Mafambane, Benjamim Canda, Costa Neto, César Reis.

Ghorwane is a Mozambican marrabenta musical band who have primarily used guitars, saxophones, and percussion instruments. It was founded in 1983. The band derived its name from the lake of the same name in the province of Gaza. This name was given by President Samora Machel during a festival to celebrate the ten years of independence in 1985. Samora has declared that "It's prohibited to lie in the People's Republic of Mozambique" and cites Ghorwane as an example. Ghorwane is the Shangaan term for "Good Boys". Their style is a combination of traditional Mozambique music, Afropop, and fusion. Ghorwane's music is sung in local languages, including Shangaan, Ronga and Chope. The band's composer and saxophonist, Jose "Zeca" Alage, was murdered in 1993. Their 2005 album VANA VA NDOTA was dedicated to Zeca Alage (1959–1993) and Pedro Langa (1959–2001).

Later that same year, Ghorwane started a music co-operative, the first of its kind in Mozambique, with the intention of promoting Mozambican music, improving working conditions for local musicians and protecting composers rights.

== Discography ==
(May not be complete)

- Majurugenta (1993)
1. Muthimba
2. Majurugenta
3. Matarlatanta
4. Xai-Xai
5. Mavabwyi
6. Sathuma
7. Buluku
8. Terehumba
9. Akuhanha
- Não é preciso empurrar (Soundtrack) (1994)
- Kudumba (1997)
1. U Yo Mussiya Kwini
2. Txongola
3. Salabude
4. Vhory
5. Massotcha
6. Pim-Pam-Pum
7. Xizambiza
8. Progresso
9. Sathani
10. Mamba Ya Malepfu
- Mozambique Relief (a compilation, fundraising album (2000)
1. Mayvavo - Ghorwane
2. Matxutxubanga
3. Wavitika - Ghorwane
4. Golheani - José Mucavele
5. Tiyisselane - Zebra
6. Xitarato
7. Lanixlamalissa - José Mucavele
8. Kadivae Mono - Stewart Sukuma
9. Danca Marrabenta - Gito Baloi
10. As Tuas Trancas - José Mucavele
11. Mayvavo LL - Ghorwane
- VANA VA NDOTA (2005)
1. Beijinhos
2. Vana-Va-Ndota
3. Nudez
4. Xindzavane
5. Kadinfuna
6. Tlhanga
7. Ubiwilitolo
8. Tlhary
9. Ndzava
10. Guidema
11. Livengo
12. Xitchukete
13. Tlhivhi

== References and external links ==
1. Ghorwane was featured in episode 5 of the BBC production The African Rock 'n' Roll Years
2. Ghorwane in Real World Records website
