= Associate international cricket in 2020 =

International cricket season

The 2020 Associate international cricket season was from May to August 2020. All official twenty over matches between Associate members of the ICC were eligible to have full Twenty20 International (T20I) or Women's Twenty20 International (WT20I) status, as the International Cricket Council (ICC) granted T20I status to matches between all of its members from 1 July 2018 (women's teams) and 1 January 2019 (men's teams). The season included all T20I/WT20I cricket series mostly involving ICC Associate members, that were played in addition to series covered in International cricket in 2020. On 24 March, ICC announced that all qualifying events scheduled to take place before 30 June had been postponed due to the ongoing COVID-19 pandemic, including the 2020 ICC T20 World Cup Europe Qualifiers and the 2020 ICC T20 World Cup Asia Eastern Region Qualifier.

== Season overview ==
International tours
Start date	Home team	Away team	Results [Matches]
Start date	Home team	Away team	T20I
2 May 2020 (Note: The tour was postponed due to the COVID-19 pandemic.)	Belgium	Romania	[3]
21 August 2020 (Note: The teams contested a single official T20I, which was the first of a three-match T20 series that was won 3–0 by Guernsey.)	Guernsey	Isle of Man	1–0 [1]
International tournaments
Start date	Tournament		Winners
26 June 2020 (Note: The tournament was postponed due to the COVID-19 pandemic.)	(Malaysia) 2020 ICC Men's T20 World Cup Asia Qualifier B		Postponed
16 August 2020 (Note: The tournament was postponed due to the COVID-19 pandemic.)	(Canada) 2020 ICC Men's T20 World Cup Americas Qualifier		Postponed
25 August 2020 (Note: The tournament was cancelled due to the COVID-19 pandemic.)	(Denmark) 2020 T20I Nordic Cup		Cancelled
28 August 2020	2020 Luxembourg T20I Trophy		Belgium
August 2020 (Note: The tournament was postponed due to the COVID-19 pandemic.)	(Spain) 2020 ICC Men's T20 World Cup Europe Qualifier A		Postponed
August 2020 (Note: The tournament was postponed due to the COVID-19 pandemic.)	(Finland) 2020 ICC Men's T20 World Cup Europe Qualifier B		Postponed
August 2020 (Note: The tournament was postponed due to the COVID-19 pandemic.)	(Belgium) 2020 ICC Men's T20 World Cup Europe Qualifier C		Postponed
August 2020 (Note: The tournament was postponed due to the COVID-19 pandemic.)	(Malaysia) 2020 Asia Cup Qualifier		Postponed

Women's International tours
Start date	Home team	Away team	Results [Matches]	
Start date	Home team	Away team	WT20I	
12 August 2020	Austria	Germany	0–5 [5]	
Women's international tournaments
Start date	Tournament			Winners
1 May 2020 (Note: The tournament was cancelled due to the COVID-19 pandemic.)	(Belize) 2020 Central American Championship			Cancelled
June 2020	(Malaysia) 2020 Women's Twenty20 Asia Cup Qualifier			Postponed

== May ==
=== 2020 Women's Central American Cricket Championship ===
The tournament was cancelled due to the COVID-19 pandemic.

=== Romania in Belgium ===
The series was postponed in March 2020 due to the COVID-19 pandemic.

== June ==
=== 2020 ICC T20 World Cup Asia Qualifier B ===
The tournament was postponed due to the COVID-19 pandemic.

=== 2020 Women's Twenty20 Asia Cup Qualifier ===
This tournament was postponed due to the COVID-19 pandemic.

== August ==
=== Germany women in Austria ===
WT20I series
No.	Date	Home captain	Away captain	Venue	Result
WT20I 867	12 August	Andrea-Mae Zepeda	Anuradha Doddaballapur	Seebarn Cricket Ground, Lower Austria	Germany by 82 runs
WT20I 868	13 August	Andrea-Mae Zepeda	Anuradha Doddaballapur	Seebarn Cricket Ground, Lower Austria	Germany by 138 runs
WT20I 869	13 August	Andrea-Mae Zepeda	Anuradha Doddaballapur	Seebarn Cricket Ground, Lower Austria	Germany by 10 wickets
WT20I 870	14 August	Andrea-Mae Zepeda	Anuradha Doddaballapur	Seebarn Cricket Ground, Lower Austria	Germany by 137 runs
WT20I 871	15 August	Andrea-Mae Zepeda	Anuradha Doddaballapur	Seebarn Cricket Ground, Lower Austria	Germany by 79 runs

=== 2020 ICC T20 World Cup Americas Qualifier ===
This tournament was postponed due to the COVID-19 pandemic.

=== Isle of Man in Guernsey ===
T20I series
No.	Date	Home captain	Away captain	Venue	Result
T20I 1085	21 August	Josh Butler	Matthew Ansell	College Field, Saint Peter Port	Guernsey by 8 wickets

=== 2020 T20I Nordic Cup ===
The Nordic Cup was cancelled a week before it was due to begin due to travel restrictions resulting from increasing COVID-19 infection rates in Denmark.

=== 2020 Luxembourg T20I Trophy ===
Team	P	W	L	T	NR	Pts	NRR
Belgium	4	4	0	0	0	8	+2.738
Luxembourg	4	1	3	0	0	2	–0.449
Czech Republic	4	1	3	0	0	2	–2.426

No.	Date	Team 1	Captain 1	Team 2	Captain 2	Venue	Result
T20I 1086	28 August	Luxembourg	Joost Mees	Czech Republic	Edward Knowles	Pierre Werner Cricket Ground, Walferdange	Luxembourg by 63 runs (DLS)
T20I 1088	29 August	Luxembourg	Joost Mees	Czech Republic	Edward Knowles	Pierre Werner Cricket Ground, Walferdange	Czech Republic by 5 wickets
T20I 1089	29 August	Luxembourg	Joost Mees	Belgium	Shaheryar Butt	Pierre Werner Cricket Ground, Walferdange	Belgium by 37 runs
T20I 1090	29 August	Belgium	Shaheryar Butt	Czech Republic	Edward Knowles	Pierre Werner Cricket Ground, Walferdange	Belgium by 46 runs
T20I 1091	30 August	Belgium	Shaheryar Butt	Czech Republic	Edward Knowles	Pierre Werner Cricket Ground, Walferdange	Belgium by 87 runs
T20I 1092	30 August	Luxembourg	Joost Mees	Belgium	Shaheryar Butt	Pierre Werner Cricket Ground, Walferdange	Belgium by 49 runs

=== 2020 ICC T20 World Cup Europe Qualifier A ===
This tournament was postponed due to the COVID-19 pandemic.

=== 2020 ICC T20 World Cup Europe Qualifier B ===
This tournament was postponed due to the COVID-19 pandemic.

=== 2020 ICC T20 World Cup Europe Qualifier C ===
This tournament was postponed due to the COVID-19 pandemic.

=== 2020 Asia Cup Qualifier ===
The 2020 Asia Cup was postponed to June 2021, and the qualifier to an unknown date, due to the COVID-19 pandemic.

== See also ==
- International cricket in 2020
- Impact of the COVID-19 pandemic on cricket
