= Luxembourg women's national cricket team =

Cricket team

Luxembourg
- Association: Luxembourg Cricket Federation

Personnel
- Captain: Aarti Priya
- Coach: Chaithanya Raju Balaraju

International Cricket Council
- ICC status: Associate member (2017)
- ICC region: Europe
ICC Rankings	Current	Best-ever
T20I	66th	66th (01 Aug 2025)

T20 Internationals
- First T20I: v. Serbia at Marina Ground, Gouvia; 5 September 2023
- Last T20I: v. Belgium at Pierre Werner Cricket Ground, Walferdange; 23 August 2026
T20Is	Played	Won/Lost
Total	25	11/14 (0 ties, 0 no results)
This year	8	3/5 (0 ties, 0 no results)
- As of 23 August 2026

The Luxembourg national women's cricket team is the team that represents Luxembourg in international women's cricket. The Luxembourg Cricket Federation became an affiliate member of the International Cricket Council (ICC) in 1998 and an associate member in 2017.

== History ==
In April 2018, the International Cricket Council (ICC) granted full Women's Twenty20 International (WT20I) status to all its members. Therefore, all Twenty20 matches that played between Luxembourg women and other ICC members after 1 July 2018 have been eligible for full WT20I status.

Luxembourg women national team played their first T20I match against Serbia on 5 September 2023 during the 2023 Greece Women's Quadrangular Series in Greece.

5 September 2023
10:00
Scorecard

Serbia; 93/5 (20 overs)	v	Luxembourg; 94/1 (11.2 overs)
Magdalena Nikolic 15 (41); Aarti Priya 2/22 (4 overs)		Siofra Lawlor 30* (36); Sladjana Matijevidc 1/27 (3 overs)

Luxembourg won by 9 wickets
Marina Ground, Gouvia

- Luxembourg won the toss and elected to bat.

== Records ==
International Match Summary — Luxembourg

Last updated 23 August 2026.

Playing Record
Format	M	W	L	T	NR	Inaugural Match
Twenty20 Internationals	25	11	14	0	0	5 September 2023

=== Twenty20 International ===
- Highest team total: 194/0 (20 overs) v Belgium, 23 August 2026 at Pierre Werner Cricket Ground, Walferdange, Luxembourg
- Highest individual score: 75*, Elena Gebhard v. Luxembourg on 23 August 2026 iat Pierre Werner Cricket Ground, Walferdange, Luxembourg
- Best individual bowling figures: 4/19, Aarti Priya v. Belgium on 19 May 2024 at Waterloo Ground, Belgium
- Highest partnership: 194*, Elena Gebhard and Pooja Agrawal for the first wicket v Belgium, 23 August 2026.

T20I record versus other nations

Records complete to WT20I #2963. Last updated 23 August 2026.

Opponent	M	W	L	T	NR	First match	First win
vs Associate Members
Austria	3	1	2	0	0	14 September 2024	14 September 2025
Belgium	8	7	1	0	0	19 May 2024	19 May 2024
Czech Republic	2	0	2	0	0	26 June 2026	
Denmark	1	0	1	0	0	15 September 2024	
Greece	1	0	1	0	0	6 September 2023	
Norway	4	0	4	0	0	14 September 2024	
Romania	2	1	1	0	0	7 September 2023	7 September 2023
Serbia	2	2	0	0	0	5 September 2023	5 September 2023
Switzerland	2	0	2	0	0	12 September 2025	

== See also ==
- Cricket in Luxembourg
- Luxembourg Cricket Federation
- List of Luxembourg women Twenty20 International cricketers
- Optimists Cricket Club
