= Swiss cricket team in Luxembourg in 2022 =

International cricket tour

Switzerland cricket team in Luxembourg in 2022
	Luxembourg	Switzerland
- Date: 11 June 2022
Captains	Joost Mees	Faheem Nazir

Twenty20 International series
- Results: 2-match series drawn 1–1
Most runs	Timothy Barker (49)	Faheem Nazir (75)
Most wickets	William Cope (4); Amit Dhingra (4)	Arjun Vinod (6)

The Switzerland cricket team toured Luxembourg in June 2022 to play two Twenty20 International (T20I) matches at the Pierre Werner Cricket Ground in Walferdange. A friendly match was played the following day after the T20Is. The series provided both sides with preparation for the 2022 ICC Men's T20 World Cup Europe sub-regional qualifier tournaments.

Luxembourg won the first T20I by 18 runs, before Switzerland won the second game by 78 runs, with the series therefore shared 1–1.

== Squads ==
Luxembourg	Switzerland
Joost Mees (c, wk); James Barker; Timothy Barker; Anshuman Bhadauria; William Cope; Amit Dhingra; Mohit Dixit; Shiv Gill; Amit Halbhavi; Atif Kamal; Pankaj Malav; Advyth Manepalli (wk); Ankush Nanda; Anoop Orsu; Girish Venkateswaran; Vikram Vijh	Faheem Nazir (c); Noorkhan Ahmedi; Aidan Andrews; Ahmed Hassan; Nicolas Henderson (wk); Bernhar Kruger; Aneesh Kumar; Asad Mahmood; Osama Mahmood; Anser Mehmood; Ali Nayyer; Jai Sinh; Idrees Ul Haque (wk); Arjun Vinod; Ashwin Vinod

== T20I series ==
=== 1st T20I ===
11 June 2022
10:00
Scorecard

Luxembourg; 133/7 (20 overs)	v	Switzerland; 115/7 (20 overs)
Timothy Barker 32 (25); Arjun Vinod 3/16 (4 overs)		Aidan Andrews 30* (33); Amit Dhingra 2/26 (4 overs)

Luxembourg won by 18 runs
Pierre Werner Cricket Ground, Walferdange
Umpires: Richard Eames (Lux) and Sri Kolla (Lux)

- Luxembourg won the toss and elected to bat.
- Shiv Gill, Anoop Orsu (Lux) and Faheem Nazir (Sui) all made their T20I debuts.

=== 2nd T20I ===
11 June 2022
15:00
Scorecard

Switzerland; 158/9 (20 overs)	v	Luxembourg; 80 (15.1 overs)
Faheem Nazir 65 (45); William Cope 3/39 (4 overs)		Timothy Barker 17 (14); Arjun Vinod 3/17 (4 overs)

Switzerland won by 78 runs
Pierre Werner Cricket Ground, Walferdange
Umpires: Sri Kolla (Lux) and Steve Tripp (Bel)

- Luxembourg won the toss and elected to field.
