= Sport in Luxembourg =

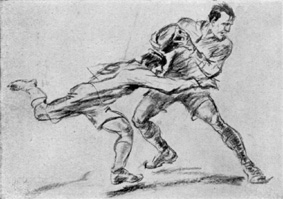
The drawing Rugby by Luxembourgeois painter Jean Jacoby, which earned him a gold medal in the 1928 Olympic art competition

Unlike in most countries in Europe, sports in Luxembourg are not concentrated upon a particular national sport, but encompasses a number of sports, both team and individual. Despite the lack of a central sporting focus, over 100,000 people in Luxembourg, which has a total population of only 610,000, are licensed members of one sports federation or another.

== Individual sports ==
=== Athletics ===
There are many athletics clubs in Luxembourg representing most of the country's main towns. The largest club is CAL Spora Luxembourg, with a membership of 400 members. At an organisational level, the same clubs are often affiliated to both the Luxembourg Athletics Federation (FLA) and the Luxembourg Triathlon Federation, the governing bodies for athletics and triathlon, respectively.

Luxembourg's sole Olympic gold medalist was an athlete. Josy Barthel won the men's 1500 metres at the 1952 Summer Olympics in Helsinki. Another Luxembourgish athlete, Michel Théato, won the marathon at the 1900 Summer Olympics in Paris, but, as his nationality was only proven to be Luxembourgish after his death, his medal is credited to France, where he lived.

More recently, David Fiegen became the first Luxembourgish athlete to win a medal at the European Athletics Championships when he took the silver in the 800 metres in the 2006 Championships in Gothenburg, the country's first international championship medal in athletics since Barthel's Olympic win. In 2025 Patrizia van der Weken took bronze medals in the 60 metres in the European and World Indoor Championships, the latter being the first world championship athletics medal won by Luxembourg.

One of the world's foremost cross-country running competitions takes place in Diekirch, the IAAF permit meeting Eurocross.

=== Cycling ===
Cycling is the sport in which Luxembourg has had most success at a professional level, and is one of the main participatory sports amongst the general population. The country's flat terrain lends itself to the sport, with the Tour de Luxembourg being run around the country on an annual basis as a prelude to the Tour de France.

Famous Luxembourgish cyclists of the past include Nicolas Frantz, Charly Gaul, François Faber, Andy Schleck and Benoît Joachim of whom the first four won the Tour de France (Frantz having done so twice). Altogether, Luxembourgish cyclists have won the Tour de France five times, ranking Luxembourg fifth overall. Currently, there are three Luxembourgish cyclists on the UCI World Tour, who are Bob Jungels, Kevin Geniets, and Alex Kirsch.

Among female cyclists, Elsy Jacobs is notable as the first ever women's road racing world champion in 1958, and as a holder of the women's world hour record. Other Luxembourgish riders include Christine Majerus and Marie Schreiber. Hess Cycling Team is a women's road cycling team which was registered in Luxembourg during 2023.

=== Tennis ===
Tennis is a popular sport, as it is across western Europe. There are 53 tennis clubs in the country, the oldest of which (TC Diekirch) was founded in 1902. The governing body is the Luxembourg Tennis Federation. The Fortis Championships Luxembourg are held in Luxembourg each year, and are ranked as a Tier III tournament on the WTA Tour.

Luxembourgers have had little success in professional tennis. Gilles Müller, considered the best men's player the country has ever produced, reached the quarter-finals of the 2008 U.S. Open and also of the 2017 Wimbledon Championships. He has a career high ranking of 21st. Women's players that have reached the top fifty include Anne Kremer (18th) and Claudine Schaul (41st). The Luxembourg Davis Cup team competes in Group II. The Luxembourg Fed Cup team competes in Group I.

== Team sports ==
=== Cricket ===
Cricket is a minority sport in Luxembourg, played predominantly within the British expatriate community located in and around Luxembourg City; very few native Luxembourgers play the sport. The game's governing body is the Luxembourg Cricket Federation, whose primary purpose is to promote the game to the non-British population.

The dominant club is the Optimists Cricket Club, which plays in the Belgian league, which it has won on three occasions. The Optimists serve as an auxiliary governing body to the LCF, organising the small domestic Luxembourgish league. The club fields multiple subsidiary teams in the domestic league, but the focus is on the Belgian league.

The sport's domestic received a boost from the patronage of Pierre Werner, former Prime Minister of Luxembourg, who served as President of the OCC and after whom the main cricket ground in Luxembourg is named the Pierre Werner Cricket Ground in Walferdange.

=== Football (soccer) ===
Football is the most popular sport in Luxembourg. The top-flight National Division is the premier domestic sports league in the country. Luxembourg was amongst the first countries in the world to be introduced to football, with the National Division being established in 1909. The men's national team played its first match in 1911, with the women's national team only playing their first match in 2006.

The game is more popular in the south of the country, having developed earliest in the industrial Red Lands and Luxembourg City. Historically, Jeunesse Esch has been the most successful domestic club, having won the National Division on 28 occasions (out of a total of 110). Since 2000, the league has been dominated by F91 Dudelange, which has won the league on sixteen occasions. Dudelange also became the first Luxembourgish team to compete in the Group Stage of the Europa League during the 2018–19 season.

The national team, nicknamed D'Rout Léiwen ('The Red Lions'), was one of the weakest in the world, having not ranked above 150th in the world since 2002. They have since reached a record high of 82 in September 2018. While not appearing at any European Championship Finals, the team did progress to the Qualifying Quarter Finals for the 1964 tournament, and to the Qualifying Play-offs for the 2024 tournament.

The most famous Luxembourgish footballer is Jeff Strasser, who has made a successful career in the French and German leagues. Luxembourg's most famous past players include Louis Pilot and Guy Hellers, both of whom also coached the national team after ending their playing careers.

=== Rugby union ===
Rugby union is a minor but growing sport in Luxembourg, with participation numbers having drastically increased over the past decade, now residing at 2,370 licences. Club Rugby in Luxembourg is successful at both junior and senior level. Rugby Club Luxembourg's first 15 plays in Bundesliga 1, with Walferdange Rugby and RCL II competing in lower German leagues. Walferdange also sports the nation's only female 15s side, which plays in the second Belgium division, competing for promotion. CSCE and Rugby Club Terre Rouge only have youth-sides which compete in Belgium and France. A fifth club, the Rugby Eagles Luxembourg, was founded in 2019 and became an official Member of the Luxembourg Rugby Federation in June 2020. This club is exclusively a child-centered rugby project.

The Senior Men National 15s is one of the highest ranked national teams among all team sports in Luxembourg, currently sitting at 64th place, making it one of Luxembourg's most successful national teams. Having gained promotion to a higher league in the European Championships for the 2018-2019 season, the ambition is to further rise in the ranking. This success has been fuelled by the junior national sides, which compete in the European National Championships at U18 and U20 level, in both Rugby 15s and 7s.

=== Field Hockey ===
Hockey in Luxembourg

Field hockey is a growing sport in Luxembourg, gaining traction particularly with the establishment of the Luxembourg Hockey Federation. The sport is primarily played in and around Luxembourg City, with participation steadily increasing in recent years, partly due to the increasing success of the sport in neighbouring countries.

Luxembourg Hockey Federation

The Luxembourg Hockey Federation serves as the governing body for field hockey in the country. Its primary objective is to promote the sport of field hockey and oversee the development of the sport at all levels, from grassroots to elite competition. Additionally, the federation is responsible for coordinating the participation of Luxembourg's national teams in international tournaments, aiming to raise the profile of field hockey within the country.

Luxembourg Hockey Club

At present, Luxembourg Hockey Club stands as the sole field hockey club in Luxembourg. Founded in 1976.

The club's youth section participates in Belgian regional competitions and engages in local initiatives with neighboring hockey clubs, fostering the growth and development of young players.

== Olympic Games ==
Luxembourg made its first appearance at the Summer Olympic Games in 1900, and the Grand Duchy has been represented as a total twenty-one Games, including every one since 1936. However, despite the country's long tradition of competing at the Summer Olympics, Luxembourg has won only two medals in all events:

- Joseph Alzin won the silver medal in the 82.5 kg+ 3 events weightlifting at the 1920 Summer Olympics in Antwerp.
- Josy Barthel won the gold medal in the 1500 m at the 1952 Summer Olympics in Helsinki.

In addition, Luxembourger Michel Théato won the gold medal in the marathon at the 1900 Summer Olympics in Paris. However, at the time, it was assumed that Théato was French, so the medal is officially credited to France.

At the Winter Olympic Games, Luxembourg has been less active. Despite competing at the second Winter Olympics, in 1928, the country has taken part in only seven in total. They have won two medals, both by Austria-born Marc Girardelli, an eleven-time world champion alpine skier, who won silver in the Super G and Giant Slalom at the 1992 Winter Olympics.

== Sports venues ==
The Stade de Luxembourg, situated in Gasperich, southern Luxembourg City, is the country's national stadium and largest sports venue in the country with a capacity of 9,386 for sporting events, including football and rugby union, and 15,000 for concerts. The largest indoor venue in the country is d'Coque, Kirchberg, north-eastern Luxembourg City, which has a capacity of 8,300. The arena is used for basketball, handball, gymnastics, and volleyball, including the final of the 2007 Women's European Volleyball Championship.

Ten largest sports venues in Luxembourg
Name	Location	Capacity	Sports
Stade de Luxembourg	Luxembourg City	9,386 (sporting events), 15,000 (concerts)	Football, rugby
d'Coque	Luxembourg City	8,300	Basketball, handball, gymnastics, volleyball
Stade Josy Barthel (due for demolition)	Luxembourg City	8,054	Football, rugby, athletics
Stade du Thillenberg	Differdange	7,150	Football
Stade Achille Hammerel	Luxembourg City	5,814	Football
Stade de la Frontière	Esch-sur-Alzette	5,400	Football
Stade rue Henri Dunant	Luxembourg City	4,830	Football
Stade Émile Mayrisch	Esch-sur-Alzette	4,830	Football, athletics
Stade Jos Nosbaum	Dudelange	4,650	Football
Op Flohr Stadion	Grevenmacher	4,000	Football
Stade Alphonse Theis	Hesperange	3,500	Football
Kockelscheuer Sport Centre	Luxembourg City	2,500	Tennis
Pierre Werner Cricket Ground	Walferdange	1,000	Cricket
Patinoire de Kockelscheuer	Luxembourg City	768	Ice Hockey, Ice skating
