= Luxembourg Cricket Federation =

Sports governing body in Luxembourg

Luxembourg Cricket Federation is the official governing body of the sport of cricket in Luxembourg. Luxembourg Cricket Federation is Luxembourg's representative at the International Cricket Council and is an associate member and has been a member of that body since 1998. It is responsible for selection and organisation of the Luxembourg national cricket team as well as organising and running the domestic cricket league.

The Optimists Cricket Club, being the largest club in Luxembourg and the only one with its own ground the Pierre Werner Cricket Ground named after the late Pierre Werner, a former Prime Minister of Luxembourg (1959–74, 1979–84), in Walferdange, works in close cooperation with the Luxembourg Cricket Federation to help organise cricket in the Grand Duchy.

Past and present Presidents; Tony Dunning, Adrian Wykes, Stephen Evans, Madhu Ramachandran.

== See also ==
- Cricket in Luxembourg
- Luxembourg national cricket team
