= International cricket in 2020 =

International cricket season

The 2020 international cricket season took place from May to September 2020. 15 Test matches, 49 One Day Internationals (ODIs) and 40 Twenty20 International (T20Is) were scheduled to be played during this period, as well as 8 Women's One Day Internationals (WODIs) and 9 Women's Twenty20 Internationals (WT20Is). Additionally, a number of other T20I/WT20I matches were also scheduled to be played in minor series involving associate nations. The season started with Australia leading the Test cricket rankings, England leading the ODI rankings and Australia leading the Twenty20 rankings.

The COVID-19 pandemic continued to impact on international cricket fixtures. Bangladesh's matches against Ireland were postponed on 21 March 2020. On 24 March 2020, the International Cricket Council (ICC) confirmed that all ICC qualifying events scheduled to take place before 30 June 2020 had been postponed. On 9 April 2020, Australia's tour to Bangladesh was postponed. On 20 April 2020, South Africa's tour to Sri Lanka was also postponed. On 22 April 2020, the Dutch government announced that it had banned all events in the country, both sports and cultural, until 1 September 2020. Two days later, the England and Wales Cricket Board (ECB) confirmed that no professional cricket would be played in England before 1 July 2020, with tours by the West Indies and India's women both being postponed. On 12 May 2020, the ICC confirmed that the 2020 Women's Cricket World Cup Qualifier, scheduled to take place in Sri Lanka, had also been postponed. The ICC announced that the qualifier had been moved back to 2021. Two days later, Cricket Scotland and Cricket Ireland confirmed the cancellation of summer fixtures, including New Zealand's tour against both sides and Pakistan's visit to Ireland.

June and July saw further disruption to international cricket due to the pandemic. The ICC confirmed that the Scotland Tri-Nation Series and the Uganda Cricket World Cup Challenge League B tournament had both been postponed. The Board of Control for Cricket in India (BCCI) confirmed that it had called off their tours to Zimbabwe and Sri Lanka. Scotland's one-off T20I match against Australia was cancelled, New Zealand's tour to Bangladesh to play two Test matches was postponed, and Bangladesh's tour to Sri Lanka to play three Test matches were all postponed. The latter was later rescheduled to be played in October 2020. On 30 June, Cricket Australia confirmed that their planned home series against Zimbabwe had also been postponed due to the virus. On 8 August 2020, Afghanistan's planned tour to Zimbabwe for five T20I matches was called off. Also in August 2020, the Netherlands tour to Zimbabwe was postponed, and India's tour to South Africa was cancelled due to a clash with the rescheduled 2020 Indian Premier League. Finally, the last scheduled series to be cancelled was the South Africa women's tour to England, which was due to take place in September 2020.

In June 2020, the ICC made several interim changes to the Playing Conditions due to the pandemic. A substitute could be used for any player showing symptoms of COVID-19, but only in a Test match. Players were banned from using saliva to shine the ball, with five penalty runs being awarded to the opposition for repeated transgressions. The requirement to use neutral match officials was temporarily lifted, along with an increase to the number of DRS reviews a team can use, due to having less experienced umpires in a match.

International men's cricket started with the first Test between England and the West Indies on 8 July 2020, with the West Indies winning by four wickets. New Zealand's tour of the West Indies, also scheduled to start on 8 July 2020, was postponed after it clashed with the rescheduling of the West Indies tour of England. South Africa's tour of the West Indies was also postponed due to the rescheduling of the England-West Indies series. Ireland's tour of England, originally scheduled in September, was brought forward to 30 July 2020, after the ECB gave the go ahead for the series. The fixture was also the first match in the 2020–2023 ICC Cricket World Cup Super League tournament, with England beating Ireland by six wickets. The ICC began the use of technology to monitor front-foot no-balls for all matches in the World Cup Super League. The ICC also started to trial the technology for the first time in a Test match, during Pakistan's Test series against England. Australia's tour to England, originally scheduled to take place in July, was moved back to September, following the rearranged series between England and Ireland. The only women's international cricket to take place was a five-match WT20I series between England and the West Indies. England Women won all of the matches, the first time they had won a bilateral series 5–0.

== Season overview ==
Men's international tours
Start date	Home team	Away team	Results [Matches]		
Start date	Home team	Away team	Test	ODI	T20I
14 May 2020 (Note: The tour was cancelled due to the COVID-19 pandemic.)	(England) Ireland	Bangladesh	—	[3]	[4]
10 June 2020	Scotland	New Zealand	—	[1]	[1]
11 June 2020	Bangladesh	Australia	[2]	—	—
15 June 2020	Netherlands	New Zealand	—	—	[1]
19 June 2020	Ireland	New Zealand	—	[3]	[3]
29 June 2020	Scotland	Australia	—	—	[1]
June 2020	Sri Lanka	South Africa	—	[3]	[3]
4 July 2020	Netherlands	Pakistan	—	[3]	—
8 July 2020 (Note: The tour was initially cancelled due to the COVID-19 pandemic, but was later rescheduled.)	England	West Indies	2–1 [3]	—	—
8 July 2020 (Note: The tour was cancelled due to a fixture clash following the rescheduling of the West Indies tour to England.)	West Indies	New Zealand	—	[3]	[3]
12 July 2020	Ireland	Pakistan	—	—	[2]
23 July 2020	(United States) West Indies	South Africa	[2]	—	[5]
30 July 2020	England	Ireland	—	2–1 [3]	—
July 2020	Netherlands	West Indies	—	[3]	—
July 2020	Zimbabwe	Afghanistan	—	—	[5]
5 August 2020	England	Pakistan	1–0 [3]	—	1–1 [3]
9 August 2020	Australia	Zimbabwe	—	[3]	—
August 2020	Bangladesh	New Zealand	[2]	—	—
August 2020 (Note: The tour was cancelled due to a fixture clash following the rescheduling of the 2020 Indian Premier League.)	South Africa	India	—	—	[3]
August 2020	Zimbabwe	India	—	[3]	—
August 2020	Sri Lanka	India	—	[3]	[3]
4 September 2020 (Note: The tour was originally scheduled to take place in July, but was rescheduled to September due to the COVID-19 pandemic.)	England	Australia	—	1–2 [3]	2–1 [3]
9 September 2020	Zimbabwe	Netherlands	—	[3]	—
Men's international tournaments
Start date	Tournament				Winners
9 June 2020 (Note: The ODI series was scheduled to take place, but was cancelled due to the COVID-19 pandemic.)	2020 Papua New Guinea Tri-Nation Series				—
18 June 2020	2020 Netherlands Quadrangular Series				—
4 July 2020	2020 Scotland Tri-Nation Series				—
3 August 2020 (Note: The List A series was scheduled to take place, but was cancelled due to the COVID-19 pandemic.)	2020 Uganda Cricket World Cup Challenge League B				—

Women's international tours
Start date	Home team	Away team	Results [Matches]		
Start date	Home team	Away team	WTest	WODI	WT20I
25 June 2020	England	India	—	[4]	[2]
1 September 2020	England	South Africa	—	[4]	[2]
21 September 2020	England	West Indies	—	—	5–0 [5]

== Rankings ==
The following were the rankings at the beginning of the season.

ICC Men's Test Team Rankings 1 May 2020
Rank	Team	Matches	Points	Rating
1	Australia	26	3,028	116
2	New Zealand	21	2,406	115
3	India	27	3,085	114
4	England	33	3,466	105
5	Sri Lanka	27	2,454	91
6	South Africa	23	2,076	90
7	Pakistan	16	1,372	86
8	West Indies	18	1,422	79
9	Afghanistan	3	170	57
10	Bangladesh	17	939	55
11	Zimbabwe	8	144	18
12	Ireland	0	0	0

ICC Men's ODI Team Rankings 1 May 2020
Rank	Team	Matches	Points	Rating
1	England	38	4,820	127
2	India	49	5,819	119
3	New Zealand	32	3,716	116
4	South Africa	31	3,345	108
5	Australia	33	3,518	107
6	Pakistan	32	3,254	102
7	Bangladesh	34	2,989	88
8	Sri Lanka	39	3,297	85
9	West Indies	43	3,285	76
10	Afghanistan	28	1,549	55
11	Ireland	21	1,039	49
12	Netherlands	5	222	44
13	Oman	12	479	40
14	Zimbabwe	24	935	39
15	Scotland	16	419	26
16	Nepal	9	161	18
Only the top 16 teams are shown

ICC Men's T20I Team Rankings 1 May 2020
Rank	Team	Matches	Points	Rating
1	Australia	19	5,285	278
2	England	17	4,564	268
3	India	35	9,319	266
4	Pakistan	21	5,470	260
5	South Africa	17	4,380	258
6	New Zealand	23	5,565	242
7	Sri Lanka	23	5,293	230
8	Bangladesh	20	4,583	229
9	West Indies	24	5,499	229
10	Afghanistan	17	3,882	228
11	Zimbabwe	18	3,442	191
12	Ireland	29	5,513	190
13	United Arab Emirates	23	4,288	186
14	Scotland	17	3,096	182
15	Nepal	23	4,148	180
16	Papua New Guinea	21	3,769	179
Only the top 16 teams are shown

ICC Women's ODI Rankings 1 May 2020
Rank	Team	Matches	Points	Rating
1	Australia	26	3,945	152
2	India	30	3,747	125
3	England	29	3,568	123
4	New Zealand	26	2,533	110
5	South Africa	36	3,626	101
6	West Indies	24	1,979	82
7	Pakistan	25	1,835	73
8	Sri Lanka	22	1,208	55
9	Bangladesh	10	542	54
10	Ireland	6	110	18

ICC Women's T20I Rankings 1 May 2020
Rank	Team	Matches	Points	Rating
1	Australia	36	10,471	291
2	England	33	9,175	278
3	New Zealand	26	7,046	271
4	India	43	11,404	265
5	South Africa	32	7,881	246
6	West Indies	30	7,371	246
7	Pakistan	34	7,795	229
8	Sri Lanka	26	5,235	201
9	Bangladesh	33	6,344	192
10	Ireland	22	3,622	165
11	Thailand	44	7,033	160
12	Zimbabwe	20	3,153	158
13	Scotland	19	2,759	145
14	Nepal	20	2,576	129
15	Papua New Guinea	23	2,894	126
16	United Arab Emirates	19	2,326	122
Only the top 16 teams are shown

=== On-going tournaments ===
The following were the rankings at the beginning of the season.

2019–2021 ICC World Test Championship
Rank	Team	Series	Points
1	India	4	360
2	Australia	3	296
3	New Zealand	3	180
4	England	2	146
5	Pakistan	3	140
6	Sri Lanka	2	80
7	South Africa	2	24
8	West Indies	1	0
9	Bangladesh	2	0
Full Table

2017–20 ICC Women's Championship
Rank	Team	Matches	Points
1	Australia	18	34
2	England	21	29
3	South Africa	18	22
4	India	18	20
5	Pakistan	18	16
6	New Zealand	18	14
7	West Indies	21	13
8	Sri Lanka	18	2
Full Table

2019–2023 ICC Cricket World Cup League 2
Rank	Team	Matches	Points
1	Oman	10	16
2	United States	12	12
3	Scotland	8	9
4	Namibia	7	8
5	United Arab Emirates	7	7
6	Nepal	4	4
7	Papua New Guinea	8	0
Full Table

2019–22 ICC Cricket World Cup Challenge League
League A
Rank	Team	Matches	Points
1	Canada	5	8
2	Singapore	5	8
3	Qatar	5	6
4	Denmark	5	4
5	Malaysia	5	2
6	Vanuatu	5	2
Full Table

2019–22 ICC Cricket World Cup Challenge League
League B
Rank	Team	Matches	Points
1	Uganda	5	10
2	Hong Kong	5	7
3	Italy	5	5
4	Jersey	5	4
5	Kenya	5	3
6	Bermuda	5	1
Full Table

== May ==
=== Bangladesh in Ireland and England ===
The tour was postponed in March 2020 due to the COVID-19 pandemic, and later rescheduled to take place in May 2022.

2020–2023 ICC Cricket World Cup Super League – ODI series
No.	Date	Home captain	Away captain	Venue	Result
1st ODI	14 May			Stormont, Belfast	
2nd ODI	16 May			Stormont, Belfast	
3rd ODI	19 May			Stormont, Belfast	
T20I series
No.	Date	Home captain	Away captain	Venue	Result
[1st T20I]	22 May			The Oval, London	
[2nd T20I]	24 May			County Ground, Chelmsford	
[3rd T20I]	27 May			County Ground, Bristol	
[4th T20I]	29 May			Edgbaston, Birmingham	

== June ==
=== 2020 Papua New Guinea Tri-Nation Series ===
The ODI series was postponed in March 2020 due to the COVID-19 pandemic.

2019–2023 ICC Cricket World Cup League 2 – Tri-series
No.	Date	Team 1	Captain 1	Team 2	Captain 2	Venue	Result
[1st ODI]	9 June					Amini Park, Port Moresby	
[2nd ODI]	10 June					Amini Park, Port Moresby	
[3rd ODI]	12 June					Amini Park, Port Moresby	
[4th ODI]	13 June					Amini Park, Port Moresby	
[5th ODI]	15 June					Amini Park, Port Moresby	
[6th ODI]	16 June					Amini Park, Port Moresby	

=== New Zealand in Scotland ===
The tour was postponed in May 2020 due to the COVID-19 pandemic.

Only T20I
No.	Date	Home captain	Away captain	Venue	Result
Only T20I	10 June			The Grange Club, Edinburgh	
Only ODI
No.	Date	Home captain	Away captain	Venue	Result
Only ODI	12 June			The Grange Club, Edinburgh	

=== Australia in Bangladesh ===
The tour was postponed in April 2020 due to the COVID-19 pandemic.

2019–2021 ICC World Test Championship – Test series
No.	Date	Home captain	Away captain	Venue	Result
1st Test	11–15 June			Zohur Ahmed Chowdhury Stadium, Chittagong	
2nd Test	19–23 June			Sher-e-Bangla National Cricket Stadium, Dhaka	

=== New Zealand in the Netherlands ===
The match was postponed in April 2020 due to the COVID-19 pandemic.

Only T20I
No.	Date	Home captain	Away captain	Venue	Result
Only T20I	15 June			Hazelaarweg Stadion, Rotterdam	

=== 2020 Netherlands Quadrangular Series ===
The series was postponed in April 2020 due to the COVID-19 pandemic.

=== New Zealand in Ireland ===
The tour was postponed in May 2020 due to the COVID-19 pandemic.

T20I series
No.	Date	Home captain	Away captain	Venue	Result
1st T20I	19 June			Bready Cricket Club Ground, Magheramason	
2nd T20I	21 June			Bready Cricket Club Ground, Magheramason	
3rd T20I	23 June			Bready Cricket Club Ground, Magheramason	
2020–2023 ICC Cricket World Cup Super League – ODI series
No.	Date	Home captain	Away captain	Venue	Result
1st ODI	27 June			Stormont, Belfast	
2nd ODI	30 June			Stormont, Belfast	
3rd ODI	2 July			Stormont, Belfast	

=== India women in England ===
The tour was postponed in April 2020 due to the COVID-19 pandemic.

WT20I series
No.	Date	Home captain	Away captain	Venue	Result
[1st WT20I]	25 June			County Ground, Taunton	
[2nd WT20I]	27 June			Bristol County Ground, Bristol	
WODI series
No.	Date	Home captain	Away captain	Venue	Result
[1st WODI]	1 July			New Road, Worcester	
[2nd WODI]	4 July			County Cricket Ground, Chelmsford	
[3rd WODI]	6 July			St Lawrence Ground, Canterbury	
[4th WODI]	9 July			County Cricket Ground, Hove	

=== South Africa in Sri Lanka ===
The tour was postponed in April 2020 due to the COVID-19 pandemic. It was rescheduled in July 2021, to take place in September 2021.

2020–2023 ICC Cricket World Cup Super League – ODI series
No.	Date	Home captain	Away captain	Venue	Result
[1st ODI]					
[2nd ODI]					
[3rd ODI]					
T20I series
No.	Date	Home captain	Away captain	Venue	Result
[1st T20I]					
[2nd T20I]					
[3rd T20I]					

=== Australia in Scotland ===
The match was cancelled in June 2020 due to the COVID-19 pandemic.

Only T20I
No.	Date	Home captain	Away captain	Venue	Result
Only T20I	29 June			The Grange Club, Edinburgh	

== July ==
=== Pakistan in the Netherlands ===
The tour was postponed in April 2020 due to the COVID-19 pandemic.

2020–2023 ICC Cricket World Cup Super League – ODI series
No.	Date	Home captain	Away captain	Venue	Result
1st ODI	4 July			VRA Cricket Ground, Amstelveen	
2nd ODI	7 July			VRA Cricket Ground, Amstelveen	
3rd ODI	9 July			VRA Cricket Ground, Amstelveen	

=== 2020 Scotland Tri-Nation Series ===
The ODI series was postponed in June 2020 due to the COVID-19 pandemic.

2019–2023 ICC Cricket World Cup League 2 – Tri-series
No.	Date	Team 1	Captain 1	Team 2	Captain 2	Venue	Result
[1st ODI]	4 July						
[2nd ODI]	5 July						
[3rd ODI]	7 July						
[4th ODI]	8 July						
[5th ODI]	10 July						
[6th ODI]	11 July						

=== West Indies in England ===
The tour was postponed in April 2020 due to the COVID-19 pandemic. In June 2020, a revised schedule was confirmed. The Test matches took place at the Rose Bowl and Old Trafford in July 2020.

2019–2021 ICC World Test Championship – Test series
No.	Date	Home captain	Away captain	Venue	Result
Test 2388	8–12 July	Ben Stokes	Jason Holder	Rose Bowl, Southampton	West Indies by 4 wickets
Test 2389	16–20 July	Joe Root	Jason Holder	Old Trafford, Manchester	England by 113 runs
Test 2390	24–28 July	Joe Root	Jason Holder	Old Trafford, Manchester	England by 269 runs

=== New Zealand in West Indies ===
The tour was postponed due to a fixture clash following the rescheduling of the West Indies tour to England.

2020–2023 ICC Cricket World Cup Super League – ODI series
No.	Date	Home captain	Away captain	Venue	Result
1st ODI	8 July			Sir Vivian Richards Stadium, Antigua	
2nd ODI	10 July			Sir Vivian Richards Stadium, Antigua	
3rd ODI	13 July			Windsor Park, Dominica	
T20I series
No.	Date	Home captain	Away captain	Venue	Result
1st T20I	15 July			Windsor Park, Dominica	
2nd T20I	18 July			Guyana National Stadium, Guyana	
3rd T20I	19 July			Guyana National Stadium, Guyana	

=== Pakistan in Ireland ===
The tour was postponed in May 2020 due to the COVID-19 pandemic, with the fixtures rescheduled for the following year.

T20I series
No.	Date	Home captain	Away captain	Venue	Result
1st T20I	12 July			The Village, Dublin	
2nd T20I	14 July			The Village, Dublin	

=== South Africa in West Indies and United States ===
The tour was postponed due to a fixture clash following the rescheduling of the West Indies tour to England, and was rescheduled for June 2021.

2019–2021 ICC World Test Championship – Test series
No.	Date	Home captain	Away captain	Venue	Result
1st Test	23–27 July			Queen's Park Oval, Trinidad and Tobago	
2nd Test	31 July – 4 August			Daren Sammy Cricket Ground, Saint Lucia	
T20I series
No.	Date	Home captain	Away captain	Venue	Result
1st T20I	8 August			Central Broward Regional Park, Lauderhill	
2nd T20I	9 August			Central Broward Regional Park, Lauderhill	
3rd T20I	12 August			Sabina Park, Jamaica	
4th T20I	15 August			Sabina Park, Jamaica	
5th T20I	16 August			Sabina Park, Jamaica	

=== West Indies in Netherlands ===
The tour was postponed in April 2020 due to the COVID-19 pandemic, and was rescheduled for June 2022.

2020–2023 ICC Cricket World Cup Super League – ODI series
No.	Date	Home captain	Away captain	Venue	Result
[1st ODI]					
[2nd ODI]					
[3rd ODI]					

=== Ireland in England ===
2020–2023 ICC Cricket World Cup Super League – ODI series
No.	Date	Home captain	Away captain	Venue	Result
ODI 4256	30 July	Eoin Morgan	Andrew Balbirnie	Rose Bowl, Southampton	England by 6 wickets
ODI 4257	1 August	Eoin Morgan	Andrew Balbirnie	Rose Bowl, Southampton	England by 4 wickets
ODI 4258	4 August	Eoin Morgan	Andrew Balbirnie	Rose Bowl, Southampton	Ireland by 7 wickets

=== Afghanistan in Zimbabwe ===
The tour was postponed in August 2020 due to the COVID-19 pandemic.

T20I series
No.	Date	Home captain	Away captain	Venue	Result
[1st T20I]					
[2nd T20I]					
[3rd T20I]					
[4th T20I]					
[5th T20I]					

== August ==
=== 2020 Uganda Cricket World Cup Challenge League B ===
The List A series was postponed in June 2020 due to the COVID-19 pandemic.

=== Pakistan in England ===
2019–2021 ICC World Test Championship – Test series
No.	Date	Home captain	Away captain	Venue	Result
Test 2391	5–9 August	Joe Root	Azhar Ali	Old Trafford, Manchester	England by 3 wickets
Test 2392	13–17 August	Joe Root	Azhar Ali	Rose Bowl, Southampton	Match drawn
Test 2393	21–25 August	Joe Root	Azhar Ali	Rose Bowl, Southampton	Match drawn
T20I series
No.	Date	Home captain	Away captain	Venue	Result
T20I 1087	28 August	Eoin Morgan	Babar Azam	Old Trafford, Manchester	No result
T20I 1093	30 August	Eoin Morgan	Babar Azam	Old Trafford, Manchester	England by 5 wickets
T20I 1094	1 September	Eoin Morgan	Babar Azam	Old Trafford, Manchester	Pakistan by 5 runs

=== Zimbabwe in Australia ===
The tour was postponed in June 2020 due to the COVID-19 pandemic.

2020–2023 ICC Cricket World Cup Super League – ODI series
No.	Date	Home captain	Away captain	Venue	Result
1st ODI	9 August				
2nd ODI	12 August				
3rd ODI	15 August			Riverway Stadium, Townsville	

=== New Zealand in Bangladesh ===
The tour was postponed in June 2020 due to the COVID-19 pandemic.

2019–2021 ICC World Test Championship – Test series
No.	Date	Home captain	Away captain	Venue	Result
[1st Test]					
[2nd Test]					

=== India in South Africa ===
The tour was postponed in August 2020 due to a fixture clash with the rescheduled 2020 Indian Premier League.

T20I series
No.	Date	Home captain	Away captain	Venue	Result
[1st T20I]					
[2nd T20I]					
[3rd T20I]					

=== India in Zimbabwe ===
The tour was postponed in June 2020 due to the COVID-19 pandemic.

2020–2023 ICC Cricket World Cup Super League – ODI series
No.	Date	Home captain	Away captain	Venue	Result
[1st ODI]					
[2nd ODI]					
[3rd ODI]					

=== India in Sri Lanka ===
The tour was postponed in June 2020 due to the COVID-19 pandemic, and was rescheduled for July 2021.

2020–2023 ICC Cricket World Cup Super League – ODI series
No.	Date	Home captain	Away captain	Venue	Result
[1st ODI]					
[2nd ODI]					
[3rd ODI]					
T20I series
No.	Date	Home captain	Away captain	Venue	Result
[1st T20I]					
[2nd T20I]					
[3rd T20I]					

== September ==
=== South Africa women in England ===
The tour was postponed in August 2020 due to the COVID-19 pandemic.

WT20I series
No.	Date	Home captain	Away captain	Venue	Result
[1st WT20I]	1 September			County Cricket Ground, Derby	
[2nd WT20I]	4 September			County Cricket Ground, Derby	
WODI series
No.	Date	Home captain	Away captain	Venue	Result
[1st WODI]	8 September			County Cricket Ground, Derby	
[2nd WODI]	11 September			County Cricket Ground, Derby	
[3rd WODI]	13 September			County Cricket Ground, Derby	
[4th WODI]	16 September			County Cricket Ground, Derby	

=== Australia in England ===
T20I series
No.	Date	Home captain	Away captain	Venue	Result
T20I 1095	4 September	Eoin Morgan	Aaron Finch	Rose Bowl, Southampton	England by 2 runs
T20I 1096	6 September	Eoin Morgan	Aaron Finch	Rose Bowl, Southampton	England by 6 wickets
T20I 1097	8 September	Moeen Ali	Aaron Finch	Rose Bowl, Southampton	Australia by 5 wickets
2020–2023 ICC Cricket World Cup Super League – ODI series
No.	Date	Home captain	Away captain	Venue	Result
ODI 4259	11 September	Eoin Morgan	Aaron Finch	Old Trafford, Manchester	Australia by 19 runs
ODI 4260	13 September	Eoin Morgan	Aaron Finch	Old Trafford, Manchester	England by 24 runs
ODI 4261	16 September	Eoin Morgan	Aaron Finch	Old Trafford, Manchester	Australia by 3 wickets

=== Netherlands in Zimbabwe ===
The tour was postponed in August 2020 due to the COVID-19 pandemic.

2020–2023 ICC Cricket World Cup Super League – ODI series
No.	Date	Home captain	Away captain	Venue	Result
[1st ODI]	9 September			Harare Sports Club, Harare	
[2nd ODI]	11 September			Harare Sports Club, Harare	
[3rd ODI]	13 September			Harare Sports Club, Harare	

=== West Indies women in England ===
WT20I series
No.	Date	Home captain	Away captain	Venue	Result
WT20I 872	21 September	Heather Knight	Stafanie Taylor	County Cricket Ground, Derby	England by 47 runs
WT20I 873	23 September	Heather Knight	Stafanie Taylor	County Cricket Ground, Derby	England by 47 runs
WT20I 875	26 September	Heather Knight	Stafanie Taylor	County Cricket Ground, Derby	England by 20 runs
WT20I 877	28 September	Heather Knight	Stafanie Taylor	County Cricket Ground, Derby	England by 44 runs
WT20I 879	30 September	Heather Knight	Stafanie Taylor	County Cricket Ground, Derby	England by 3 wickets

== See also ==
- Associate international cricket in 2020
- Impact of the COVID-19 pandemic on cricket
