= Australian cricket team in England in 2020 =

International cricket tour

| | England | Australia |
- Dates: 4 – 16 September 2020
| Captains | Eoin Morgan (Note: Moeen Ali captained England for the third T20I.) | Aaron Finch |

One Day International series
- Results: Australia won the 3-match series 2–1
| Most runs | Jonny Bairstow (196) | Glenn Maxwell (186) |
| Most wickets | Jofra Archer (7) | Adam Zampa (10) |
- Player of the series: Glenn Maxwell (Aus)

Twenty20 International series
- Results: England won the 3-match series 2–1
| Most runs | Dawid Malan (129) | Aaron Finch (125) |
| Most wickets | Adil Rashid (6) | Ashton Agar (5) |
- Player of the series: Jos Buttler (Eng)

The Australia cricket team toured England to play three One Day International (ODI) and three Twenty20 International (T20I) matches in September 2020. The ODI matches formed part of the inaugural 2020–2023 ICC Cricket World Cup Super League. Originally, the matches were scheduled to take place in July 2020, but were moved back to September 2020, due to the COVID-19 pandemic. On 14 August 2020, Cricket Australia named a touring squad of 21 players, after gaining government exemptions to travel to the United Kingdom. The T20Is were played at the Rose Bowl in Southampton, the ODIs were played at Old Trafford in Manchester, with all the fixtures played behind closed doors.

England won the first two T20I matches, winning the series with an unassailable lead. For the third T20I fixture, Moeen Ali captained England for the first time in an international match, after Eoin Morgan suffered a hand injury in the second T20I. Australia went on to win the match by five wickets, with England winning the series 2–1. With their win in the third T20I, Australia finished at the top of the ICC T20I Championship rankings. Australia won the ODI series 2–1. It was the first time in five years that England had lost an ODI series at home, after Australia beat them 3–2 in September 2015.

== Background ==
In May 2020, it was suggested that the dates for the series were moved back to September, to accommodate the rescheduling of the ODI fixtures against Ireland due to the pandemic. Later the same month, Kevin Roberts, the then CEO of Cricket Australia, said that there was still a chance that the series would take place. On 17 June 2020, Cricket Scotland confirmed that their one-off T20I match against Australia had been cancelled. At the time of the cancellation, new dates for Australia's matches against England were in discussion, with both cricket boards working out a revised schedule for September 2020. On 6 July 2020, the England and Wales Cricket Board (ECB) confirmed discussions were still ongoing to host the series. On 16 July 2020, Cricket Australia named a 26-man preliminary squad to begin training ahead of the planned tour to England. On 14 August 2020, Cricket Australia named a squad of 21 players to tour England, with the team departing from Perth on 23 August 2020.

== Squads ==
| England | | Australia |
| ODIs | T20Is | ODIs and T20Is |
|---|---|---|
| Eoin Morgan (c); Moeen Ali; Jofra Archer; Jonny Bairstow (wk); Tom Banton; Sam Billings; Jos Buttler (wk); Sam Curran; Tom Curran; Adil Rashid; Joe Root; Jason Roy; Chris Woakes; Mark Wood | Eoin Morgan (c); Moeen Ali; Jofra Archer; Jonny Bairstow (wk); Tom Banton; Sam Billings; Jos Buttler (wk); Sam Curran; Tom Curran; Joe Denly; Chris Jordan; Dawid Malan; Adil Rashid; Mark Wood | Aaron Finch (c); Pat Cummins (vc); Sean Abbott; Ashton Agar; Alex Carey (wk); Josh Hazlewood; Marnus Labuschagne; Nathan Lyon; Mitchell Marsh; Glenn Maxwell; Riley Meredith; Josh Philippe; Daniel Sams; Kane Richardson; Steve Smith; Mitchell Starc; Marcus Stoinis; Andrew Tye; Matthew Wade; David Warner; Adam Zampa |

Australia did not name individual squads for the ODI and T20I matches, opting instead to name a combined squad of 21 players for the tour.

Joe Denly and Saqib Mahmood were named as reserve players for England's ODI squad, with Liam Livingstone and Saqib Mahmood named as reserve players for the T20I squad. On 6 September 2020, Phil Salt was added to England's list of reserve players for the ODI matches. Jos Buttler ruled himself out of England's squad for the third T20I match for personal reasons. On 9 September 2020, Jason Roy was added to England's ODI squad, with Dawid Malan named as a reserve player for the matches.

== Practice matches ==
Prior to the international matches, Australia trained at the County Cricket Ground in Derby. The team then travelled to Southampton to play intra-squad practice matches at the Rose Bowl. Aaron Finch and Pat Cummins were named as the captains of the two teams, with a cricketer from Hampshire County Cricket Club also included to make the full complement of 22 players. The first warm-up match was scheduled to be 50 overs per side, but was reduced to a 20-over game, after rain was forecast for later in the day. The rain did end the first match early, after 5.5 overs were bowled in the second innings. Conversely, the next practice match was scheduled to be played as a 20-over match, but was changed to a 50-over game. Finally, Australia's squad played two 20-over matches on 1 September 2020, with Aaron Finch's team winning both matches.

28 August 2020
10:30
Scorecard

| Finch XI; 150 (20 overs) | v | Cummins XI; 60/0 (5.5 overs) |
| David Warner 42 (35); Adam Zampa 2/18 (3 overs) | | Matthew Wade 36* (18) |

No result
Rose Bowl, Southampton

- Rain during Cummins XI's innings prevented any further play.

30 August 2020
Scorecard

| Finch XI; 249 (48.4 overs) | v | Cummins XI; 250/8 (41.3 overs) |
| Andrew Tye 59 (50); Marcus Stoinis 4/31 (7 overs) | | Glenn Maxwell 108 (114); Nathan Lyon 3/47 (9.3 overs) |

Cummins XI won by 2 wickets
Rose Bowl, Southampton

1 September 2020
Scorecard

| Finch XI; 166/8 (20 overs) | v | Cummins XI; 143/6 (20 overs) |
| Aaron Finch 53 (37); Ashton Agar 3/26 (4 overs) | | Alex Carey 50* (43); Andrew Tye 2/15 (3 overs) |

Finch XI won by 23 runs
Rose Bowl, Southampton

1 September 2020
Scorecard

| Finch XI; 229/3 (20 overs) | v | Cummins XI; 197 (20 overs) |
| Alex Carey 107 (60); Kane Richardson 1/34 (3 overs) | | Marcus Stoinis 68 (37); Nathan Lyon 4/29 (4 overs) |

Finch XI won by 32 runs
Rose Bowl, Southampton

== T20I series ==
=== 1st T20I ===
4 September 2020
18:00 (N)
Scorecard

| England; 162/7 (20 overs) | v | Australia; 160/6 (20 overs) |
| Dawid Malan 66 (43); Kane Richardson 2/13 (3 overs) | | David Warner 58 (47); Adil Rashid 2/29 (4 overs) |

England won by 2 runs
Rose Bowl, Southampton
Umpires: Martin Saggers (Eng) and Alex Wharf (Eng)
Player of the match: Dawid Malan (Eng)

- Australia won the toss and elected to field.
- Chris Jordan (Eng) played in his 50th T20I.

=== 2nd T20I ===
6 September 2020
14:15
Scorecard

| Australia; 157/7 (20 overs) | v | England; 158/4 (18.5 overs) |
| Aaron Finch 40 (33); Chris Jordan 2/40 (4 overs) | | Jos Buttler 77* (54); Ashton Agar 2/27 (4 overs) |

England won by 6 wickets
Rose Bowl, Southampton
Umpires: Mike Burns (Eng) and David Millns (Eng)
Player of the match: Jos Buttler (Eng)

- Australia won the toss and elected to bat.
- Jonny Bairstow became the first batsman for England to be dismissed by hitting his own wicket in T20Is.

=== 3rd T20I ===
8 September 2020
18:00 (N)
Scorecard

| England; 145/6 (20 overs) | v | Australia; 146/5 (19.3 overs) |
| Jonny Bairstow 55 (44); Adam Zampa 2/34 (4 overs) | | Aaron Finch 39 (26); Adil Rashid 3/21 (4 overs) |

Australia won by 5 wickets
Rose Bowl, Southampton
Umpires: Martin Saggers (Eng) and Alex Wharf (Eng)
Player of the match: Mitchell Marsh (Aus)

- Australia won the toss and elected to field.
- Moeen Ali captained England for the first time in T20Is.

== ODI series ==
=== 1st ODI ===
11 September 2020
13:00 (D/N)
Scorecard

| Australia; 294/9 (50 overs) | v | England; 275/9 (50 overs) |
| Glenn Maxwell 77 (59); Mark Wood 3/54 (10 overs) | | Sam Billings 118 (110); Adam Zampa 4/55 (10 overs) |

Australia won by 19 runs
Old Trafford, Manchester
Umpires: Richard Kettleborough (Eng) and David Millns (Eng)
Player of the match: Josh Hazlewood (Aus)

- England won the toss and elected to field.
- This was the 150th ODI match between England and Australia.
- Sam Billings (Eng) scored his maiden century in ODIs.
- World Cup Super League points: Australia 10, England 0.

=== 2nd ODI ===
13 September 2020
13:00 (D/N)
Scorecard

| England; 231/9 (50 overs) | v | Australia; 207 (48.4 overs) |
| Eoin Morgan 42 (52); Adam Zampa 3/36 (10 overs) | | Aaron Finch 73 (105); Chris Woakes 3/32 (10 overs) |

England won by 24 runs
Old Trafford, Manchester
Umpires: Michael Gough (Eng) and Martin Saggers (Eng)
Player of the match: Jofra Archer (Eng)

- England won the toss and elected to bat.
- World Cup Super League points: England 10, Australia 0.

=== 3rd ODI ===
16 September 2020
13:00 (D/N)
Scorecard

| England; 302/7 (50 overs) | v | Australia; 305/7 (49.4 overs) |
| Jonny Bairstow 112 (126); Adam Zampa 3/51 (10 overs) | | Glenn Maxwell 108 (90); Joe Root 2/46 (8 overs) |

Australia won by 3 wickets
Old Trafford, Manchester
Umpires: Richard Illingworth (Eng) and Alex Wharf (Eng)
Player of the match: Glenn Maxwell (Aus)

- England won the toss and elected to bat.
- Jonny Bairstow (Eng) scored his 10th century in ODIs.
- Glenn Maxwell (Aus) became the fastest batsman, in terms of balls faced, to score 3,000 runs in ODIs (2,440).
- Alex Carey (Aus) scored his maiden century in ODIs.
- Carey and Maxwell also made the highest sixth-wicket partnership for Australia in ODIs with 212 runs.
- World Cup Super League points: Australia 10, England 0.
