= Quidditch Benelux =

- Abbreviation: QuidBenelux, QBenelux
- Formation: June 1, 2014
- Legal status: Informal Council
- Headquarters: Brussels, Rotterdam, Luxembourg City
- Location: Belgium, Netherlands, Luxembourg
- Council Members: President & VP External of BMQ, President & VP External of MQN, President & VP External of the FLQ
- Main organ: International Quidditch Association

Quidditch Benelux is the informal organization of quidditch within the Benelux, consisting of the three member organizations of Belgium Muggle Quidditch, Muggle Quidditch Nederland and the Luxembourgish Quidditch Federation. QBenelux represents these three organizations at the international level in the International Quidditch Association and is a liaison between the three organizations, acting as a bridge and central aide for all international events occurring within the region. Its founding was in 2014 at the creation of BMQ and MQN.

== Structure ==
QBenelux consists of the heads of the three member organizations: BMQ, MQN and the FLQ. Each organization sends their President and VP (External) to represent their country. The QBenelux Council, or the Council, meets every several months to discuss changes and events within the tri-nation region and plans the next several months before the next meeting. The primary goal of QBenelux is to provide a space of consistent contact between the three organizations as well as be a resource for all international events happening within its borders. Moreover, QBenelux is the owner of the yearly Benelux Cup where the host organization of that year is the organizer.

Its de facto, working language is English, but its official languages are: English, French, Dutch, German and Luxembourgish, offering at any time translation or interpretation services when needed.

== Benelux Cup ==
The Benelux Cup is the yearly, culminating competition for the Benelux. As the IQA is going through its reorganization, it is unknown what the tournament structure for the 2014/2015 season and beyond will be, but it is speculated that there will be an invite-only European Championship where the Benelux Cup will be one of the qualifying tournaments.

== See also ==
- Quadball
- International Quidditch Association
- Sport in the Netherlands
- Sport in Belgium
- Sport in Luxembourg
