= 2020 Luxembourg T20I Trophy =

International cricket tournament

- Date: 28–30 August 2020
- Location: Luxembourg
- Result: Belgium won the series
Teams
Belgium	Czech Republic	Luxembourg
Captains
Shaheryar Butt	Edward Knowles	Joost Mees
Most runs
Shaheryar Butt (236)	Honey Gori (106)	Joost Mees (124)
Most wickets
Ashiqullah Said (7)	Kushalkumar Mendon (5)	Marcus Cope (7)

The 2020 Luxembourg T20I Trophy was a Twenty20 International (T20I) cricket tournament that was played in Luxembourg from 28 to 30 August 2020. The participating teams were the hosts Luxembourg, along with Belgium and Czech Republic. The matches were played at the Pierre Werner Cricket Ground in Walferdange. These were the first official T20I matches to be played in Luxembourg since the International Cricket Council announced that all matches played between Associate Members from 1 January 2019 would be eligible for T20I status. The series was organised to provide players with some international cricket after the postponement of the 2019 T20 World Cup Europe Qualifier. Belgium won the series with a game to spare, ending with a perfect record of four victories.

== Squads ==
Belgium	Czech Republic	Luxembourg
Shaheryar Butt (c); Khalid Ahmadi; Saqlain Ali; Murid Ekrami; Sazzad Hosen; Syed Jamil (wk); Mamoon Latif; Nemish Mehta (vc); Sherul Mehta (wk); Muhammad Muneeb; Ashiqullah Said; Gurnam Singh; Wahidullah Usmani; Saber Zakhil	Edward Knowles (c) (wk); Hilal Ahmad; Naveed Ahmed; Arun Ashokan; Sabawoon Davizi; Abul Farhad; Shripal Gajjar (wk); Kyle Gilham; Honey Gori; Siddarth Goud; Kushalkumar Mendon; Sumit Pokhriyal; Shoumyadeep Rakshit; Surya Rengarajan; Sudesh Wickramasekara	Joost Mees (c) (wk); James Barker; Scott Browne; Marcus Cope; William Cope; Mohit Dixit; Reinhardt Heyns; Saransh Kushretha; Pankaj Malav; Advyth Manepalli (wk); Ankush Nanda; Shameek Vats; Vikram Vijh; Tony Whiteman

== Points table ==
Team	P	W	L	T	NR	Pts	NRR
Belgium	4	4	0	0	0	8	+2.738
Luxembourg	4	1	3	0	0	2	–0.449
Czech Republic	4	1	3	0	0	2	–2.426

== Fixtures ==
28 August 2020
16:00 (D/N)
Scorecard

Luxembourg; 164/7 (20 overs)	v	Czech Republic; 89/9 (16.5 overs)
Joost Mees 40 (24); Arun Ashokan 1/12 (2 overs)		Honey Gori 38 (27); Marcus Cope 3/16 (4 overs)

Luxembourg won by 63 runs (DLS method)
Pierre Werner Cricket Ground, Walferdange
Umpires: Jahan Gir Jhan (Bel) and Adriaan van den Dries (Ned)

- Luxembourg won the toss and elected to bat.
- No further play was possible due to rain.
- Scott Browne, William Cope, Saransh Kushretha, Pankaj Malav, Advyth Manepalli (Lux), Shripal Gajjar and Kyle Gilham (Cze) all made their T20I debuts.

29 August 2020
09:30
Scorecard

Luxembourg; 112 (18.5 overs)	v	Czech Republic; 115/5 (18.5 overs)
James Barker 27 (29); Naveed Ahmed 3/10 (1 over)		Honey Gori 35 (21); Vikram Vijh 2/24 (3.5 overs)

Czech Republic won by 5 wickets
Pierre Werner Cricket Ground, Walferdange
Umpires: Ben Lougheed (Lux) and Peter Vincent (Cze)

- Luxembourg won the toss and elected to bat.
- Surya Rengarajan (Cze) made his T20I debut.

29 August 2020
13:00
Scorecard

Belgium; 165/8 (20 overs)	v	Luxembourg; 128/8 (20 overs)
Shaheryar Butt 81* (45); William Cope 2/22 (4 overs)		Tony Whiteman 36 (22); Khalid Ahmadi 3/14 (4 overs)

Belgium won by 37 runs
Pierre Werner Cricket Ground, Walferdange
Umpires: Jahan Gir Jhan (Bel) and Adriaan van den Dries (Ned)

- Belgium won the toss and elected to bat.
- Reinhardt Heyns (Lux), Khalid Ahmadi, Sazzad Hosen, Nemish Mehta, Muhammad Muneeb and Wahidullah Usmani (Bel) all made their T20I debuts.

29 August 2020
16:00 (D/N)
Scorecard

Belgium; 197/6 (20 overs)	v	Czech Republic; 151/8 (20 overs)
Shaheryar Butt 125* (50); Honey Gori 2/22 (4 overs)		Sudesh Wickramasekara 60 (36); Ashiqullah Said 3/15 (4 overs)

Belgium won by 46 runs
Pierre Werner Cricket Ground, Walferdange
Umpires: Jahan Gir Jhan (Bel) and Ben Lougheed (Lux)

- Belgium won the toss and elected to bat.
- Shaheryar Butt became the first batsman for Belgium to score a century in T20Is.
- Shaheryar Butt also became the first cricketer to score a fifty and a century in two T20I matches on the same day.

30 August 2020
10:00
Scorecard

Belgium; 161/6 (20 overs)	v	Czech Republic; 74/7 (20 overs)
Wahidullah Usmani 72 (50); Kushalkumar Mendon 1/14 (4 overs)		Arun Ashokan 23 (30); Saber Zakhil 3/20 (4 overs)

Belgium won by 87 runs
Pierre Werner Cricket Ground, Walferdange
Umpires: Jahan Gir Jhan (Bel) and Peter Vincent (Cze)

- Belgium won the toss and elected to bat.

30 August 2020
14:00
Scorecard

Belgium; 184/8 (20 overs)	v	Luxembourg; 135/3 (20 overs)
Saber Zakhil 44 (16); William Cope 4/18 (4 overs)		Joost Mees 67* (55); Khalid Ahmadi 2/19 (4 overs)

Belgium won by 49 runs
Pierre Werner Cricket Ground, Walferdange
Umpires: Ben Lougheed (Lux) and Adriaan van den Dries (Ned)

- Belgium won the toss and elected to bat.
- Shameek Vats (Lux) and Sherul Mehta (Bel) both made their T20I debuts.
