= Raschpëtzer Qanat =

Coordinates: 49°40′8.26″N 6°8′33.83″E

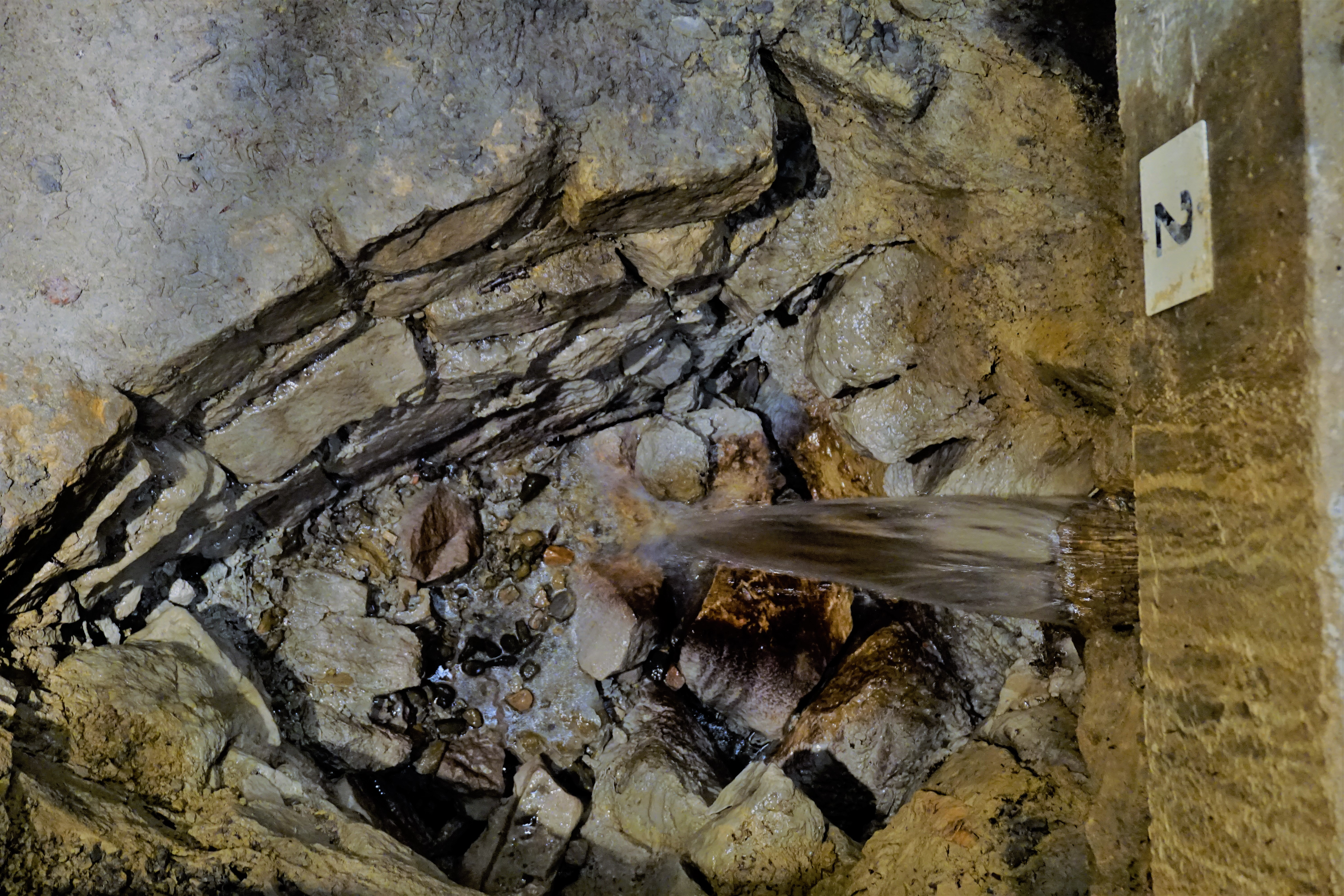
Raschpëtzer Qanat

The Raschpëtzer is a qanat located north-east of Helmsange, in the commune of Walferdange, in southern Luxembourg.

It is a particularly well preserved example of a qanat and is probably the most extensive system of its kind north of the Alps. It has been under systematic excavation for the past 40 years. To date some 330 metres (1,080 ft) of the total tunnel length of 600 metres (2,000 ft) have been explored. Thirteen of the 20 to 25 shafts have been discovered.

The qanat appears to have provided water for a large Roman villa on the slopes of the Alzette valley. It was built during the Gallo-Roman period, probably around the year 150 and functioned for about 120 years thereafter.
