= Cricket in Luxembourg =

Cricket in Luxembourg is dominated by the British and Indian expatriate communities, and remains a minor sport amongst native Luxembourgers.

Luxembourg City, home to 1,800 Britons, is the centre of the sport, and all of Luxembourg's club sides are situated in the city's metropolitan area.

The dominant club has been the Optimists Cricket Club, which plays in the Belgian league, and has won that country's league title on three occasions (1991, 1994, 1995). The Optimists, being the largest club in Luxembourg and the only one with its own ground, works in close cooperation with the Luxembourg Cricket Federation to help organise cricket in the Grand Duchy. The Optimists also organise other teams, which, whilst they play against the main side in the domestic tournament, will often pool their players with the Optimists' for matches against foreign opponents. The club plays at the Pierre Werner Cricket Ground, in Walferdange. The ground is named after the late Pierre Werner, a former Prime Minister of Luxembourg (1959–74, 1979–84). Werner had fallen in love with cricket when living in London in 1930, and went on to become the Honorary President of the OCC, which had been established when he was Prime Minister. Werner opened the OCC's new ground when it was opened in 1992. Widely viewed as one of the best cricket grounds in mainland Europe (outside of the Netherlands) the ground lies in a picturesque setting just ten minutes from Luxembourg City centre. It boasts a large outfield, four practice bays, a clubhouse with catering facilities, a cricket/tennis pavilion and various other amenities.

Luxembourgish cricket's governing body is the Luxembourg Cricket Federation (French: Fédération Luxembourgeoise de Cricket), which was established in 1993 to organise the game in Luxembourg and to promote it to the non-British population.

The national team has competed in the forty-over European Cricket Council Division Four Championship. They came 11th in Vienna in 2003 (captained by Madhu Ramachandran), and gained a first victory (over Bulgaria) in Ljubljana in 2004 (captained by Adrian Wykes). In 2006 (captained by Romesh Paul) they narrowly missed out on promotion, having beaten Finland but then losing in the last over to Cyprus. In the corresponding tournament in Cyprus in September 2009, Luxembourg ended fourth out of six.

In recent years Luxembourg has had both a regular Men’s and an Under 15 (mixed) international team.

== See also ==
- Sport in Luxembourg
- Luxembourg national cricket team
