= Walferdange railway station =

Railway station in Walferdange, Luxembourg

Walferdange Walfer
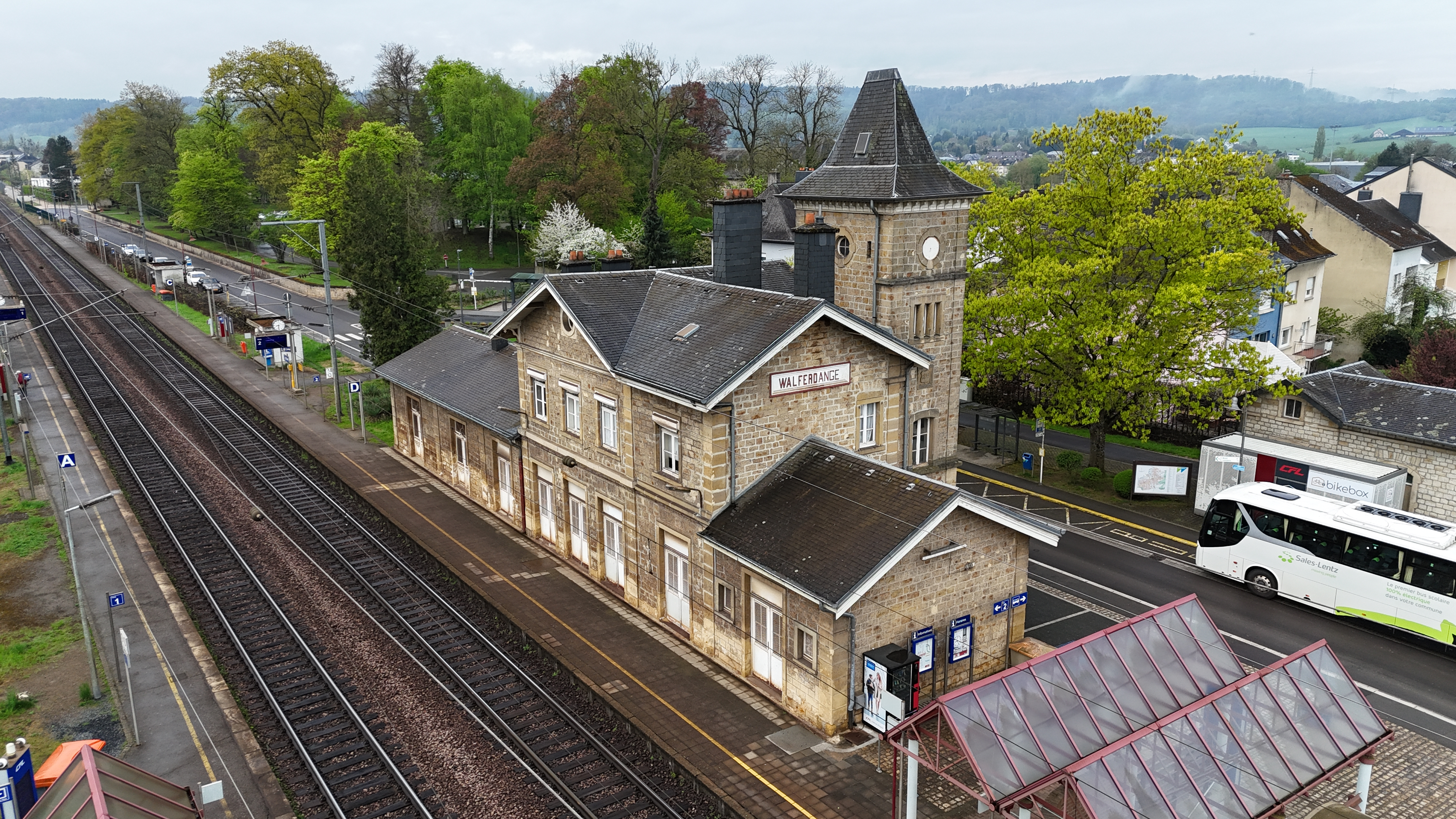

General information
- Location: Rue de la Station L-7226 Walferdange
- Coordinates: 49°39′43″N 06°08′10″E
- Operator: CFL
- Line: CFL Line 10
- Platforms: 2
- Tracks: 2
- Train operators: CFL
- Connections: AVL bus line 11

Construction
- Cycle facilities: 16 mBox cycle spaces; 7 cycle spaces

Other information
- Website: CFL

History
- Opened: 21 July 1862

Passengers
- 2022: 274,238
- Rank: 22 of 60

Services
| Preceding station | CFL | Following station |
|---|---|---|
| Dommeldange towards Luxembourg | Line 10 | Mersch towards Troisvierges |
| Dommeldange towards Luxembourg | Line 10 | Heisdorf towards Diekirch |
Location

Walferdange railway station (Luxembourgish: Gare Walfer, French: Gare de Walferdange, German: Bahnhof Walferdingen) is a railway station serving Walferdange, in central Luxembourg. It is operated by Chemins de Fer Luxembourgeois, the state-owned railway company.

The station is situated on Line 10, which connects Luxembourg City to the centre and north of the country.
