= Bereldange =

Town in Luxembourg

Coordinates: 49°39′N 6°08′E

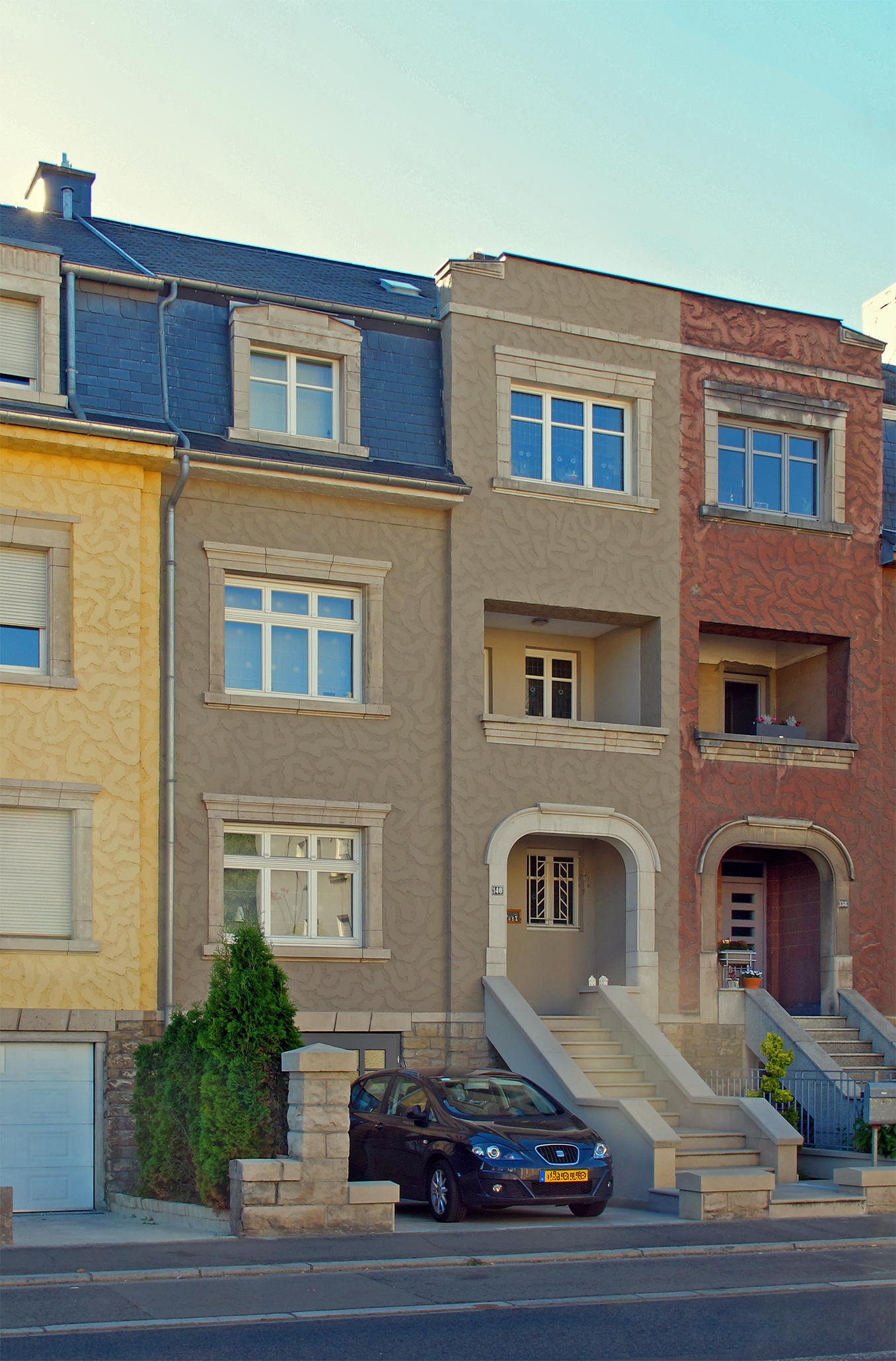
Buildings in Bereldange

Bereldange (Luxembourgish: Bäreldeng [ˈbɛːʀəldeŋ]; German: Bereldingen [ˈbeːʁəldɪŋən]) is a town in the commune of Walferdange, in central Luxembourg. As of 2026, the town has a population of 4,874.

Bereldange was part of the commune of Steinsel until 1 January 1851.
