= Dommeldange railway station =

Railway station in Luxembourg City, Luxembourg

Dommeldange Dummeldeng
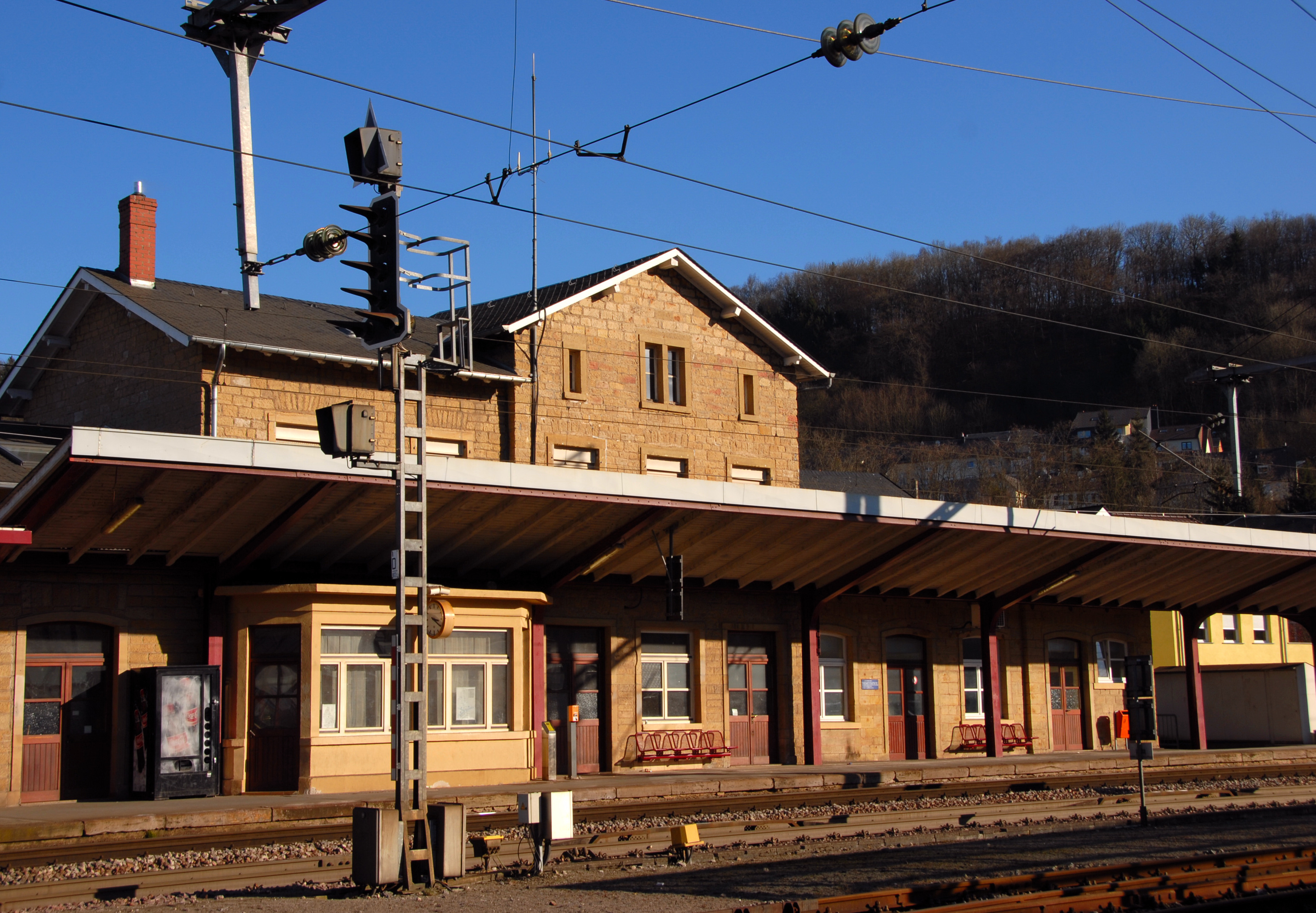

General information
- Location: Rue de la Station L-2552 Luxembourg
- Coordinates: 49°38′02″N 06°08′12″E
- Operator: CFL
- Line: CFL Line 10
- Platforms: 2
- Tracks: 2
- Train operators: CFL
- Connections: AVL bus lines 25, 32

Other information
- Website: CFL

History
- Opened: 21 July 1862

Passengers
- 2022: 399,035
- Rank: 17

Services
Preceding station	CFL	Following station
Pfaffenthal-Kirchberg towards Luxembourg	Line 10	Walferdange towards Troisvierges or Diekirch
Location

Dommeldange railway station (Luxembourgish: Gare Dummeldeng, French: Gare de Dommeldange, German: Bahnhof Dommeldingen) is a railway station serving Dommeldange, a district in the north of Luxembourg City, in southern Luxembourg. It is operated by Chemins de Fer Luxembourgeois, the state-owned railway company.

The station is situated on Line 10, which connects Luxembourg City to the centre and north of the country. It is the second stop north out of Luxembourg station, which is located 4.5 kilometres (2.8 mi) to the south, on the other side of the Ville Haute.
