= List of Luxembourg Twenty20 International cricketers =

In April 2018, the ICC decided to grant full Twenty20 International (T20I) status to all its members. Therefore, all Twenty20 matches played between Luxembourg and other ICC members after 1 January 2019 will be eligible for T20I status.

This list comprises all members of the Luxembourg cricket team who have played at least one T20I match. It is initially arranged in the order in which each player won his first Twenty20 cap. Where more than one player won his first Twenty20 cap in the same match, those players are listed alphabetically by surname (according to the name format used by Cricinfo).

Luxembourg played their first match with T20I status on 29 August 2019 against Turkey during the 2019 Continental Cup.

== Key ==
General

- ‡ – Captain
- † – Wicket-keeper
- First – Year of debut
- Last – Year of latest game
- Mat – Number of matches played

Batting

- Runs – Runs scored in career
- HS – Highest score
- 50 – Half-centuries scored
- Avg – Runs scored per dismissal
- * – Batsman remained not out

Bowling

- Balls – Balls bowled in career
- Wkt – Wickets taken in career
- BBI – Best bowling in an innings
- Ave – Average runs per wicket

Fielding

- Ca – Catches taken
- St – Stumpings affected

== List of players ==
Statistics are correct as of 20 August 2026.

Luxembourg T20I cricketers
General					Batting				Bowling				Fielding		Ref
No.	Name	First	Last	Mat	Runs	HS	Avg	50	Balls	Wkt	BBI	Ave	Ca	St	Ref
1	Atif Kamal	2019	2022	15	44	12	5.50	0	276	15	3/15	20.46	6	0	
2	Timothy Barker	2019	2026	52	1052	78	20.62	4	–	–	–	–	26	0	
3	Chris Fry	2019	2019	3	2	2	2.00	0	42	1	1/3	62.00	1	0	
4	Joost Mees‡†	2019	2024	40	709	85	22.15	3	–	–	–	–	20	2	
5	Ankush Nanda	2019	2025	34	71	21*	6.45	0	644	36	5/6	23.02	13	0	
6	Richard Neale	2019	2019	3	1	1	0.50	0	18	1	1/30	30.00	0	0	
7	Suhail Sadiq	2019	2019	2	7	7*	–	0	36	3	2/13	15.00	0	0	
8	Girish Venkateswaran	2019	2026	29	452	59	18.83	1	194	7	2/28	47.00	4	0	
9	Vikram Vijh‡	2019	2026	57	1031	64*	21.93	2	1007	56	4/19	23.71	8	0	
10	Roshan Vishwanath	2019	2023	6	15	5	5.00	0	–	–	–	–	0	0	
11	Tony Whiteman‡	2019	2021	14	241	55*	34.42	1	22	1	1/24	38.00	3	0	
12	James Barker	2019	2024	36	519	48	23.59	0	–	–	–	–	14	0	
13	Marcus Cope	2019	2026	14	46	15*	11.50	0	286	19	3/16	21.89	10	0	
14	Mohit Dixit	2019	2023	28	149	38	10.64	0	485	20	3/19	31.15	7	0	
15	Scott Browne	2020	2020	4	41	21	10.25	0	–	–	–	–	5	0	
16	William Cope	2020	2026	41	361	51	12.44	1	378	20	4/18	24.50	15	0	
17	Saransh Kushretha	2020	2024	13	62	28	8.85	0	288	16	3/20	18.37	5	0	
18	Pankaj Malav	2020	2024	28	41	10*	5.12	0	519	28	3/22	23.00	6	0	
19	Advyth Manepalli†	2020	2025	15	207	57	15.92	1	–	–	–	–	15	0	
20	Reinhardt Heyns	2020	2020	2	20	20	20.00	0	–	–	–	–	2	0	
21	Shameek Vats	2020	2025	7	–	–	–	–	114	3	3/54	64.33	0	0	
22	Aanand Pandey	2020	2021	3	15	15	15.00	0	–	–	–	–	0	0	
23	Amit Halbhavi†	2021	2025	20	240	48	12.00	0	–	–	–	–	4	0	
24	Amit Dhingra	2021	2023	18	9	5*	3.00	0	339	18	2/26	24.94	2	0	
25	Anoop Orsu	2022	2026	28	304	58*	16.88	1	30	1	1/15	53.00	6	0	
26	Shiv Gill	2022	2026	44	935	67*	23.37	3	239	11	2/14	27.45	18	0	
27	Anshuman Bhadauria	2022	2022	2	40	21	20.00	0	–	–	–	–	1	0	
28	Ansh Trivedi	2022	2022	1	–	–	–	–	6	0	–	–	0	0	
29	Eliyas Jabarkhel	2023	2026	11	41	16*	6.83	0	232	9	3/25	33.44	3	0	
30	Thomas Martin	2023	2024	6	119	35	19.83	0	30	2	1/23	24.50	3	0	
31	Milad Momend	2023	2026	19	14	6	2.33	0	402	28	4/38	21.10	6	0	
32	Harpal Virdee	2023	2023	1	1	1*	–	0	12	1	1/26	26.00	1	0	
33	Jigyasu Pant	2023	2023	1	40	40	40.00	0	–	–	–	–	0	0	
34	Benjamin Embleton	2025	2026	5	37	26	12.33	0	–	–	–	–	2	0	
35	Kamal Soukhiya	2025	2026	13	39	12	3.90	0	300	17	4/26	23.17	3	0	
36	Mayank Nagayach	2025	2026	11	90	31	10.00	0	234	3	2/26	99.66	5	0	
37	Sareer Shah	2025	2026	7	2	1*	1.00	0	133	4	2/21	51.00	3	0	
38	Vivek Dixit	2025	2026	6	32	15*	8.00	0	78	4	2/30	31.25	1	0	
39	Asghar Ali Khan	2026	2026	8	215	88*	35.83	1	–	–	–	–	1	0	
40	Jatin Madan	2026	2026	8	35	16*	17.50	0	162	10	3/27	26.80	6	0	
41	Edmund Packard	2026	2026	4	28	16*	–	0	95	5	2/26	24.60	0	0	
42	Navieen Pugalendhi	2026	2026	1	–	–	–	–	18	0	–	–	0	0	
