= Quidditch Nederland =

Governing body quidditch in the Netherlands

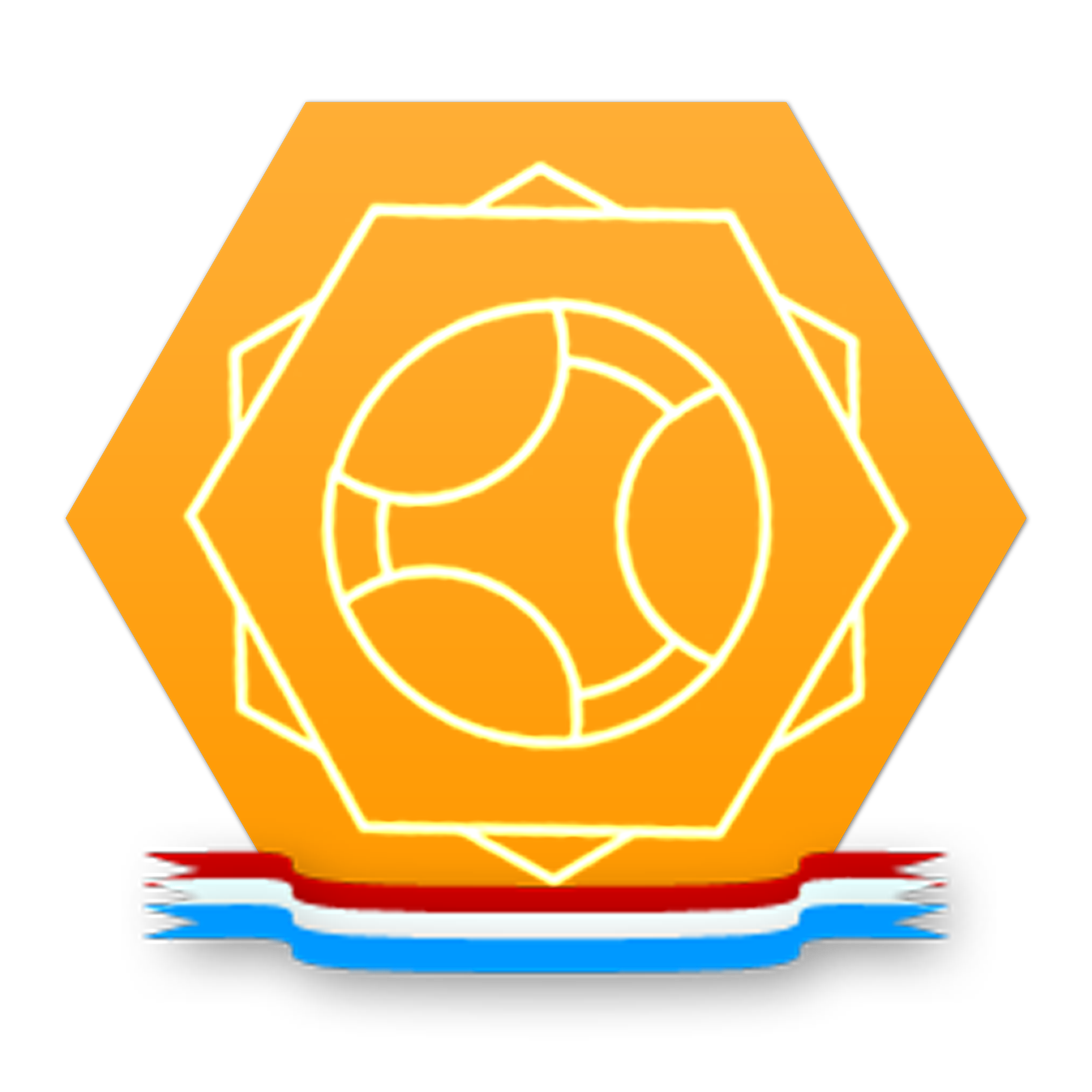
- Abbreviation: QNL
- Formation: 5 January 2014 (12 years ago)
- Type: National governing body (NGB)
- Legal status: Nonprofit, in process
- Headquarters: Wageningen, Netherlands
- Members: 6 teams
- President: Marit Epskamp
- Vice President: Jori Noordenbos
- Secretary: Kevin Prins
- Parent organization: International Quidditch Association
- Website: QNL Official Website

Quidditch Nederland, formerly known as Muggle Quidditch Nederland, is the official governing body of the sport quidditch in the Netherlands, and affiliated with the International Quidditch Association and its European Committee. Quidditch is a sport which combines elements of handball, dodgeball, and rugby, and is derived from the fictional sport of the same name from the Harry Potter series. Its current president is Marit Epskamp, and the vice-president is Jori Noordenbos. Quidditch Nederland, then Muggle Quidditch Nederland, was founded in 2014 by Jerona van der Gevel and Bram Vries as part of Quidditch Benelux.

== History ==
QNL discussion began before and during the 2014 IQA European Championships where ideas from Belgium Muggle Quidditch were shared. Earlier that year, WizardWear had planned a Harry Potter-themed Quidditch tournament at the Netherlands' largest fantasy fair, Elfia. Through a series of discussions with WizardWear staff and QNL heads, it was decided that instead of a series of cosplay Quidditch matches, Elfia would include a fantasy tournament, invited quidditch players and non-quidditch players alike to sign up. Only one team was an official team: the Deurne Dodo's, whereas the other teams consisted of players from Belgium, the UK and France as well as from across the Netherlands. After the two-day tournament, where the Dodo's won with the fantasy black team coming into a close second place, interested parties came together to plan the creation of teams in Rotterdam, Amsterdam and Utrecht amongst other cities. Currently, there are about four active teams in the Netherlands, overseen by Quidditch Nederland, with another three to six in the process of creation. As of June 1, 2014, Quidditch Nederland began its transition to a nonprofit with the opening of applications for its executive and administrative staff.

== Structure ==
QNL's day-to-day governance is handled by the QNL Board, which is elected by its membership. The board consists of at least four individuals, containing at least a President, Secretary, and Treasurer. Furthermore, the Secretary, Treasurer, or one of the other boardmembers will be named vice-president.

The President additionally holds seats on the International Quidditch Association's Congress, as well as seats in the IQA's European Committee (also known as Quidditch Europe).

=== Current board (2020/2021) ===
- President: Marit Epskamp
- Vice-president: Jori Noordenbos
- Treasurer: Anna Bakker
- Secretary: Kevin Prins
- Public Relations: combined function filled by the board
- Gameplay Director: Lennard Hommel

=== QNL board 2019/2020 ===
- President: Laurent Lardenois
- Vice-president: Yuri Vissers
- Treasurer: Kyra Rombouts
- Secretary: Kevin Prins
- Public Relations: Marit Epskamp
- Gameplay Director: Lennard Hommel

=== QNL board 2018/19 ===
- President: Laurent Lardenois
- Vice-president: Anna Bakker
- Treasurer: Kyra Rombouts
- Secretary: Max van Veen
- Public Relations: Kevin Prins
- Gameplay Director: Gaëlle Pelupessy

=== Presidents over the years ===
- 2020–present Marit Epskamp
- 2018-2020 Laurent Lardenois
- 2017-2018 Robin Mier
- 2016-2017 Chula Bruggeling
- 2014-2016 Jerona van der Gevel

== Tournaments and events ==
The Netherlands organises several quidditch tournaments of varying scales, and participates in multiple international tournaments.

=== Dutch Quidditch Cup ===
The main tournament of the season is the Dutch Quidditch Cup, in which QNL teams face each other to compete for the Dutch title. Over the years, the date of the tournament within the season has moved around, from November in the 2015/2016 season to January in the 2016/2017 season and to May in the 2017/2018 season As an organisation, Quidditch Nederland has not yet set a formalised, structural date at which the tournament is supposed to be held.

List of Dutch Quidditch Cups:

Season	Date	Hosting city	Winner
2015-2016	November 21, 2015	Wageningen	North Sea Nargles
2016-2017	January 22, 2017	Utrecht	Dom Tower Dementors
2017-2018	May 26/27 2018	Enschede	Twentse Thestrals

=== Dutch Quidditch League ===
The 2016/2017 season saw the creation of the Dutch Quidditch League, an attempt to create a more formalised, season-long competitive structure. Interested QNL teams sign up for the league at the start of the season, and will meet each other several times over the course of the season, culminating in a season-wide ranking at the end based on all games played. In the beginning of this tournament there would be 2 leagues each year. An Autumn edition and a Spring edition. Both would see all teams play each other twice. After Lumos Eindhoven joined the competition as the sixth team this would prove unpractical, resulting in the 2018–2019 season to be the first with only one league.

The current standings of the Dutch Quidditch League 2018-2019 are as follows:

Place	Team	Played	Wins	Wins out of SWIM	PD
1	Twentse Thestrals	4	4	3	330
2	Rotterdam Ravens	3	2	2	150
3	Domtower Dementors	4	2	0	-30
4	Wageningen Werewolves	4	1	1	-220
5	Lumos Eindhoven	3	0	0	-230

∗North Sea Nargles have played 2 matches, but disbanded during the season. All matches from the Nargels have been removed from the league standings

The final result of the Dutch Quidditch League 2018 (spring) are as follows:

Place	Team	Wins	PD	QPD
1	Rotterdam Ravens	6	380	260
2	Twentse Thestrals	5	60	0
3	North Sea Nargles	4	-10	-40
4	Wageningen Werewolves	3	0	120
5	Dom Tower Dementors	2	-430	-340

∗In case of a tie, the first tiebreaker are head-to-head results

The past winners of the Dutch Quidditch League are:

Season	Winner
Autumn 2016	Dom Tower Dementors
Spring 2017	Dom Tower Dementors
Autumn 2017	North Sea Nargles
Spring 2018	Rotterdam Ravens

=== Open Dutch Summer Cup ===
In 2016 the first Open Dutch Summer Cup was held in Utrecht. The tournament is open to official teams from both the Netherlands and abroad, as well as unofficial and so-called merc teams (teams consisting of players not formally part of the same team).

=== Benelux Cup ===
The Benelux Cup made its debut in the 2014/2015 season with the introduction of the new IQA. It is a yearly event that features teams from Belgium, the Netherlands and Luxembourg. The event was originally meant as the culminating tournament for the Benelux League, the competitive season shared amongst Quidditch Nederland (then Muggle Quidditch Nederland), the Belgian Quidditch Federation (then Belgium Muggle Quidditch) and Luxembourg Muggle Quidditch.

=== International tournaments ===
As an official member of Quidditch Europe and the International Quidditch Association, Quidditch Nederland participates in several major international tournaments: the European Quidditch Cup for club teams, and the European Games and IQA World Cup for national teams.

The Netherlands first attended the European Quidditch Cup on 18–19 April 2015 in Oxford, UK, represented by the North Sea Nargles and the Wageningen Werewolves.

The Dutch national quidditch team, nicknamed the Flying Dutchmen, has attended the European Games since its inaugural event on 25–26 July 2015 in Sarteano, Italy. It has attended the IQA World Cup since its rebranding under the current name on 23–24 July 2016 in Frankfurt, Germany.

=== Fantasy tournaments ===
QNL first tournament was a fantasy tournament held during Elfia, the Netherlands' biggest fantasy fair, on April 20 and 21, 2014. It featured players from France, Germany, the UK, Belgium and the Netherlands.

== Official teams ==
Teams in the Netherlands pay a yearly subscription fee to QNL to be official. Currently, the competitive teams within the country are:

- Utrecht: Dom Tower Dementors
- Rotterdam: Rotterdam Ravens
- Wageningen: Wageningen Werewolves
- Enschede: Twentse Thestrals
- Eindhoven: Lumos Eindhoven

Official developing teams within the country are:

- Maastricht: Mosasaurs
- Amsterdam: Amsterdam Manticores

Former teams

- Leiden: North Sea Nargles

=== National team ===
Besides club teams, QNL also hosts a national team, nicknamed the Flying Dutchmen. The team made its debut at the 2015 European Games in Sarteano, Italy. The team trains from roughly February until that seasons main international tournament, which is either the IQA World Cup or the European Games, depending on the year. Players can be scouted and invited to join by the team's coaches during the previous months.

== See also ==
- Muggle quidditch
- International Quidditch Association
- Sport in the Netherlands
