= Kevin Roberts (cricketer) =

Australian cricketer (born 1972)

Personal information
- Born: 25 July 1972 (age 54); Sydney, Australia
- Source: ESPNcricinfo, 23 January 2017

Kevin Roberts (born 25 July 1972) is an Australian cricketer. He played 23 first-class and 18 List A matches for New South Wales between 1994/95 and 1997/98. In October 2018, he was named as the CEO of Cricket Australia, replacing James Sutherland.

In June 2020, he resigned from his position of CEO, after immense media scrutiny following his response to the COVID-19 pandemic. His decision to lay off 80 per cent of CA staff from 27 April 2020, was considered a key reason for his dismissal. However former Australian cricketer Allan Border defended him by saying "Roberts is not alone responsible for the board's financial crisis".

== See also ==
- List of New South Wales representative cricketers
