= Helmsange =

Coordinates: 49°39′N 6°08′E

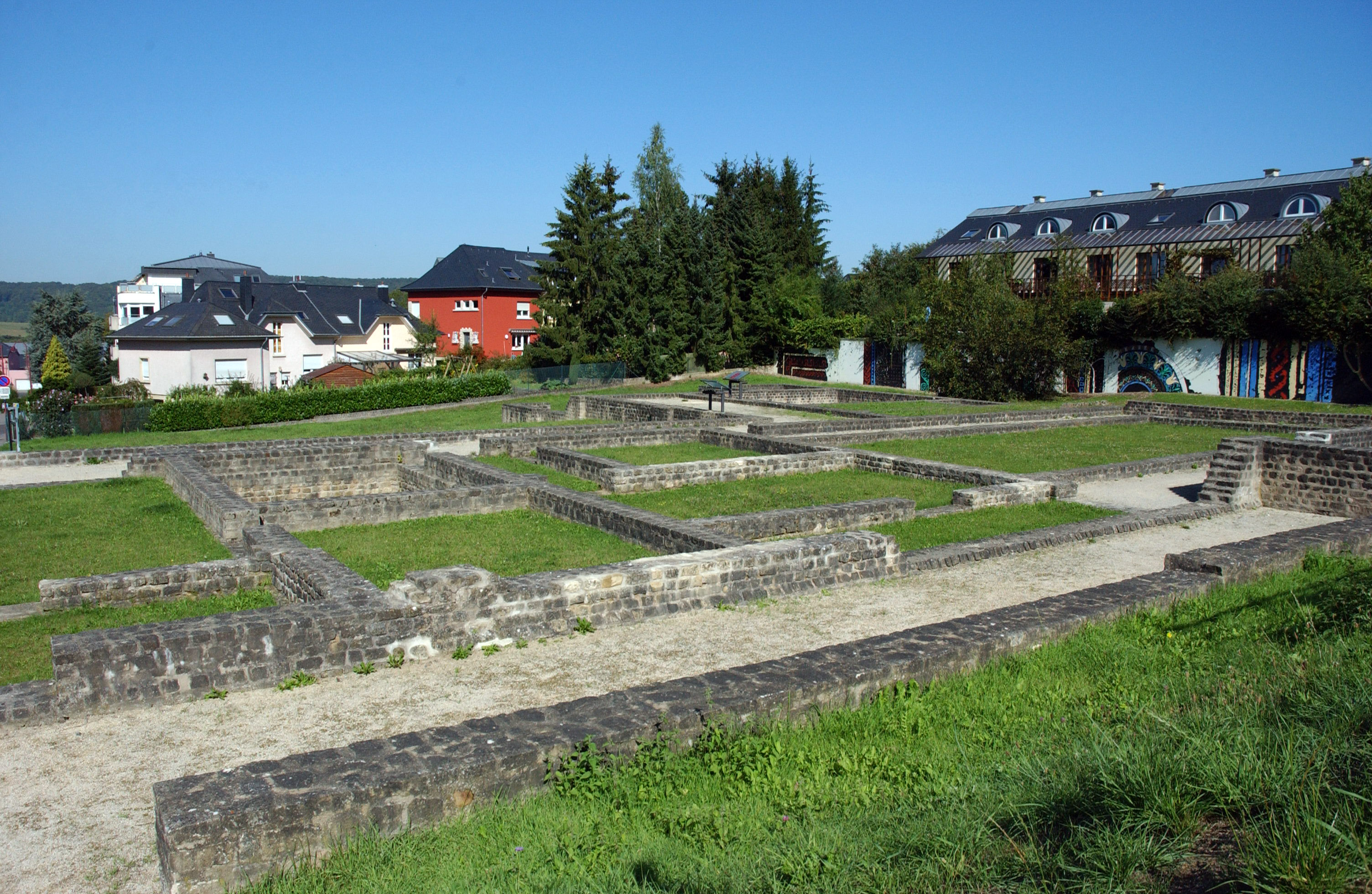
Roman villa of Helmsange

Helmsange (Luxembourgish: Helsem, German: Helmsingen) is a town in the commune of Walferdange, in central Luxembourg. It has a population of 3,435 as of 2026.
