= Indian cricket team in South Africa in 2020 =

International cricket tour

The India cricket team were scheduled to tour South Africa in August 2020 to play three Twenty20 International (T20I) matches. The tour was not part of the Future Tours Programme, and was aimed at kickstarting the economy of both cricket boards due to the COVID-19 pandemic. The series would have taken place in a "bio-bubble" environment in empty stadiums. Cricket South Africa also made a contingency of playing the T20I matches as late as March 2021, if it is not possible to play them at the start of their summer season.

South Africa were scheduled to play three One Day International (ODI) matches against India in March 2020. However, after the first match was washed out, the remaining two matches were cancelled due to the pandemic.

However, in August 2020, the tour was cancelled due to a clash with the rescheduled 2020 Indian Premier League.
