= Luxembourg national cricket team =

Cricket team

Luxembourg
- Association: Luxembourg Cricket Federation

Personnel
- Captain: Shiv Gill

International Cricket Council
- ICC status: Associate member (2017)
- ICC region: Europe
ICC Rankings	Current	Best-ever
T20I	79th	40th (2-May-2019)

International cricket
- First international: v France at Saint Peter Port, Guernsey; 21 May 1990

T20 Internationals
- First T20I: v Turkey at Moara Vlasiei Cricket Ground, Moara Vlăsiei; 29 August 2019
- Last T20I: v Bulgaria at Kerava National Cricket Ground, Kerava; 20 August 2026
T20Is	Played	Won/Lost
Total	60	21/39 (0 ties, 0 no results)
This year	8	3/5 (0 ties, 0 no results)
T20I kit
- As of 20 August 2026

The Luxembourg national cricket team represents Luxembourg in international cricket. The Luxembourg Cricket Federation became an affiliate member of the International Cricket Council (ICC) in 1998 and an associate member in 2017.

== Ground ==
Luxembourg's home ground is at the Pierre Werner Cricket Ground, in Walferdange which belongs to the country's largest club, the Optimists Cricket Club. The ground is named after the late Pierre Werner, a former Prime Minister of Luxembourg (1959–74, 1979–84). Werner had fallen in love with cricket when living in London in 1930, and went on to become the Honorary President of the OCC, which had been established when he was Prime Minister. Werner opened the OCC's new ground in 1992. Widely viewed as one of the best cricket grounds in mainland Europe (excluding grounds in the Netherlands), the ground lies in the picturesque setting just ten minutes from Luxembourg City center. It boasts a large outfield (with two tracks laid on different bases), four practice bays, a clubhouse with catering facilities, a cricket/tennis pavilion and various other amenities.

== History ==
Luxembourg men's international debut came at the 1990 European Cricketer Cup, a European Cricket Council tournament. Outside of occasional matches against Belgium, the team did not return to international level until 2003, when they finished last in the ECC Trophy, an eleven-team tournament for ICC affiliate members. The following year, they took part in the ECC Representative Championship in Slovenia, finishing in fifth place, nearly upsetting Croatia, and completing their first international win, against Bulgaria.

In 2006, Luxembourg took part in Division Four of the European Championship in Belgium, beating Finland, losing narrowly to Slovenia, and losing in the last over against Cyprus. Having narrowly missed out on promotion in 2006, they would play in Division Four again in 2009.

In 2009, Luxembourg again participated in Division Four of the ICC European Championship in Limassol, Cyprus. It won two games, against Slovenia and Finland, and lost three, finishing 4th out of six competing nations. The Luxembourg team won the Spirit of Cricket award.

In 2011, following a restructuring of the ICC European Divisions, Luxembourg participated in the ICC Europe Division 2 (T20) Championship, which took place in Belgium and involved 11 teams. Following a victory over Cyprus in the group stage, Luxembourg advanced to the 5th–8th place play-off where they eventually finished 8th. Belgium beat Austria in the final and both teams were promoted to ICC Europe Division 1.

=== 2018-Present ===
In April 2018, the ICC decided to grant full Twenty20 International (T20I) status to all its members. Therefore, all Twenty20 matches played between Luxembourg and other ICC members after 1 January 2019 will be a full T20I. Luxembourg played their first T20I match against Turkey on 29 August 2019 during the 2019 Continental Cup in Romania.

29 August 2019
12:15
Scorecard

Turkey; 28 (11.3 overs)	v	Luxembourg; 29/2 (3.1 overs)
Hasan Helva 7 (15); Ankush Nanda 5/6 (2.3 overs)		Vikram Vijh 11* (3); Serkan Kizilkaya 2/9 (1 over)

Luxembourg won by 8 wickets
Moara Vlasiei Cricket Ground, Ilfov County
Umpires: Mark Jameson (Ger) and Thomas Kentorp (Den)

- Turkey won the toss and elected to bat.
- First ever T20I match for Luxembourg.

== Tournament history ==
T20 World Cup Europe Sub-regional Qualifiers	European Cricket Championship	European T20 Championship
(Netherlands) 2018: Did not participate; (Finland) 2022: 5th place; (Italy) 2024: 8th place	(Belgium) 2006 (Division four): 3rd place — remained; (Cyprus) 2009 (Division four): 4th place	(Belgium) (Netherlands) 2011 (Division two): 8th place; (Greece) 2012 (Division two): 9th place

ECC Trophy	ECC Representative Tournament
(Austria) 2003: 11th place	(Slovenia) 2004: 5th place

== Current squad ==
Updated as of 25 July 2025.

This lists all the players who were part of the Luxembourg's squad for the 2025 Budapest Cup.

Name	Age	Batting style	Bowling style	Last T20I	Notes
Batters
Vivek Dixit	32	Right-handed	Right-arm off break	(Austria) 2025	
Mayank Nagayach	33	Left-handed	Slow left-arm orthodox	(Hungary) 2025	
Girish Venkateswaran	37	Right-handed	Right-arm medium	(Hungary) 2025	
Anoop Orsu	35	Right-handed	Right-arm medium-fast	(Hungary) 2025	
Timothy Barker	31	Left-handed	—N/a	(Hungary) 2025	
Benjamin Embleton	40	Right-handed	—N/a	(Switzerland) 2025	
All-rounder
Vikram Vijh	39	Left-handed	Right-arm medium-fast	(Hungary) 2025	
Shiv Gill	41	Right-handed	Right-arm medium	(Hungary) 2025	Captain
Wicket-keeper
Amit Halbhavi	36	Right-handed	—N/a	(Hungary) 2025	
Advyth Manepalli	38	Right-handed	—N/a	(Hungary) 2025	
Pace Bowlers
Kamal Soukhiya	33	Right-handed	Right-arm medium	(Hungary) 2025	
Ankush Nanda	40	Right-handed	Right-arm medium-fast	(Switzerland) 2025	
Sareer Shah	33	Left-handed	Left-arm medium	(Hungary) 2025	
Milad Momend	23	Right-handed	Right-arm medium	(Hungary) 2025	
Shameek Vats	35	Right-handed	Right-arm medium-fast	(Austria) 2025	

== Records ==
International Match Summary — Luxembourg

Last updated 20 August 2026.

Playing Record
Format	M	W	L	T	NR	Inaugural Match
Twenty20 Internationals	60	21	39	0	0	29 August 2019

=== Twenty20 International ===
- Highest team total: 197/4 (15.4 overs) v. Serbia on 26 June 2026 at Vinoř Cricket Ground, Prague
- Highest individual score: 88*, Asghar Ali Khan v. Serbia on 26 June 2026 at Vinoř Cricket Ground, Prague
- Best individual bowling figures: 5/6, Ankush Nanda v. Turkey on 29 August 2019 at Moara Vlasiei Cricket Ground, Moara Vlăsiei

Most T20I runs for Luxembourg

Player	Runs	Average	Career span
Timothy Barker	1,052	20.62	2019–2026
Vikram Vijh	1,031	21.93	2019–2026
Shiv Gill	935	23.37	2022–2026
Joost Mees	709	22.15	2019–2024
James Barker	519	23.59	2019–2024

Most T20I wickets for Luxembourg

Player	Wickets	Average	Career span
Vikram Vijh	56	23.71	2019–2026
Ankush Nanda	36	23.02	2019–2025
Milad Momend	28	21.10	2023–2026
Pankaj Malav	28	23.00	2020–2024
William Cope	20	24.50	2020–2026
Mohit Dixit	20	31.15	2019–2023

T20I record versus other nations

Records complete to T20I #4090. Last updated 20 August 2026.

Opponent	M	W	L	T	NR	First match	First win
vs Associate Members
Austria	7	1	6	0	0	31 August 2019	23 May 2021
Belgium	2	0	2	0	0	29 August 2020	
Bulgaria	3	2	1	0	0	2 September 2021	2 September 2021
Czech Republic	9	3	6	0	0	1 September 2019	28 August 2020
Finland	1	0	1	0	0	18 August 2026	
France	4	1	3	0	0	11 July 2023	15 July 2023
Gibraltar	2	1	1	0	0	15 October 2023	15 October 2023
Guernsey	1	0	1	0	0	25 July 2022	
Hungary	3	1	2	0	0	4 September 2021	4 September 2021
Isle of Man	2	0	2	0	0	15 June 2024	
Israel	1	0	1	0	0	16 June 2024	
Italy	1	0	1	0	0	9 June 2024	
Malta	4	2	2	0	0	2 September 2021	2 September 2021
Romania	5	1	4	0	0	30 August 2019	15 July 2023
Serbia	2	2	0	0	0	26 June 2026	26 June 2026
Slovenia	1	1	0	0	0	30 July 2022	30 July 2022
Spain	1	0	1	0	0	17 August 2026	
Switzerland	9	4	5	0	0	11 June 2022	11 June 2022
Turkey	2	2	0	0	0	29 August 2019	29 August 2019

== See also ==
- Cricket in Luxembourg
- Luxembourg Cricket Federation
- List of Luxembourg Twenty20 International cricketers
- Optimists Cricket Club
