= Optimists Cricket Club =

The Optimists Cricket Club, known simply as the Optimists or abbreviated to OCC, is a cricket club based in Walferdange, in central Luxembourg. The Optimists play matches in various formats and competitions and, being the largest club in Luxembourg and the only one with its own ground, works in close cooperation with the Luxembourg Cricket Federation to help organise cricket in the Grand Duchy.

== History ==
The Optimists are the oldest cricket club in Luxembourg, having been founded in 1976 by British expatriates, whose ranks had been swollen by Luxembourg City's growth as a financial centre and by the UK's entry into the European Economic Community.

The Optimists participate in both the Belgian Cricket League and the Luxembourg Cricket League but its main competitive focus is in the Belgian cricket league, which it won on three occasions in the early 1990s (1991, 1994, 1995). The Optimists 1st XI have won the 2nd division of this competition five times in the last seven seasons (2015, 2016, 2017, 2018 and 2021) but are currently prohibited from promotion to the top division due to the Belgian Sports Ministry's policy on clubs situated outside Belgian territory. The Optimists 2nd XI re-entered the Belgian cricket league in 2018 and either won and/or gained promotion from the division it was competing in each season.

== Ground ==
The club plays at the Pierre Werner Cricket Ground, in Walferdange. The ground is named after the late Pierre Werner, a former Prime Minister of Luxembourg (1959–74, 1979–84). Werner had fallen in love with cricket when living in London in 1930, and went on to become the Honorary President of the OCC, which had been established when he was Prime Minister. Werner opened the OCC's new ground when it was opened in 1992. Widely viewed as the best cricket grounds in mainland Europe (excluding grounds in the Netherlands), the ground lies in the picturesque setting just ten minutes from Luxembourg City center. It boasts a large outfield, four practice bays, a clubhouse with catering facilities, a cricket/tennis pavilion and various other amenities.

== Facts ==
The club is currently captained by Mohit Dixit and Joost Mees is the chairman of the club's committee.

The club's sponsors have included New Delhi Restaurant, Citco, Brasserie Nationale, Citadel, Dresdner Bank, Schroders, as well as support from the commune of Walferdange.

== See also ==
- Cricket in Luxembourg
