= Pierre Werner Cricket Ground =

Sports ground in central Luxembourg

Coordinates: 49.6644°N 6.1276°E

- Walferdange Cricket Ground
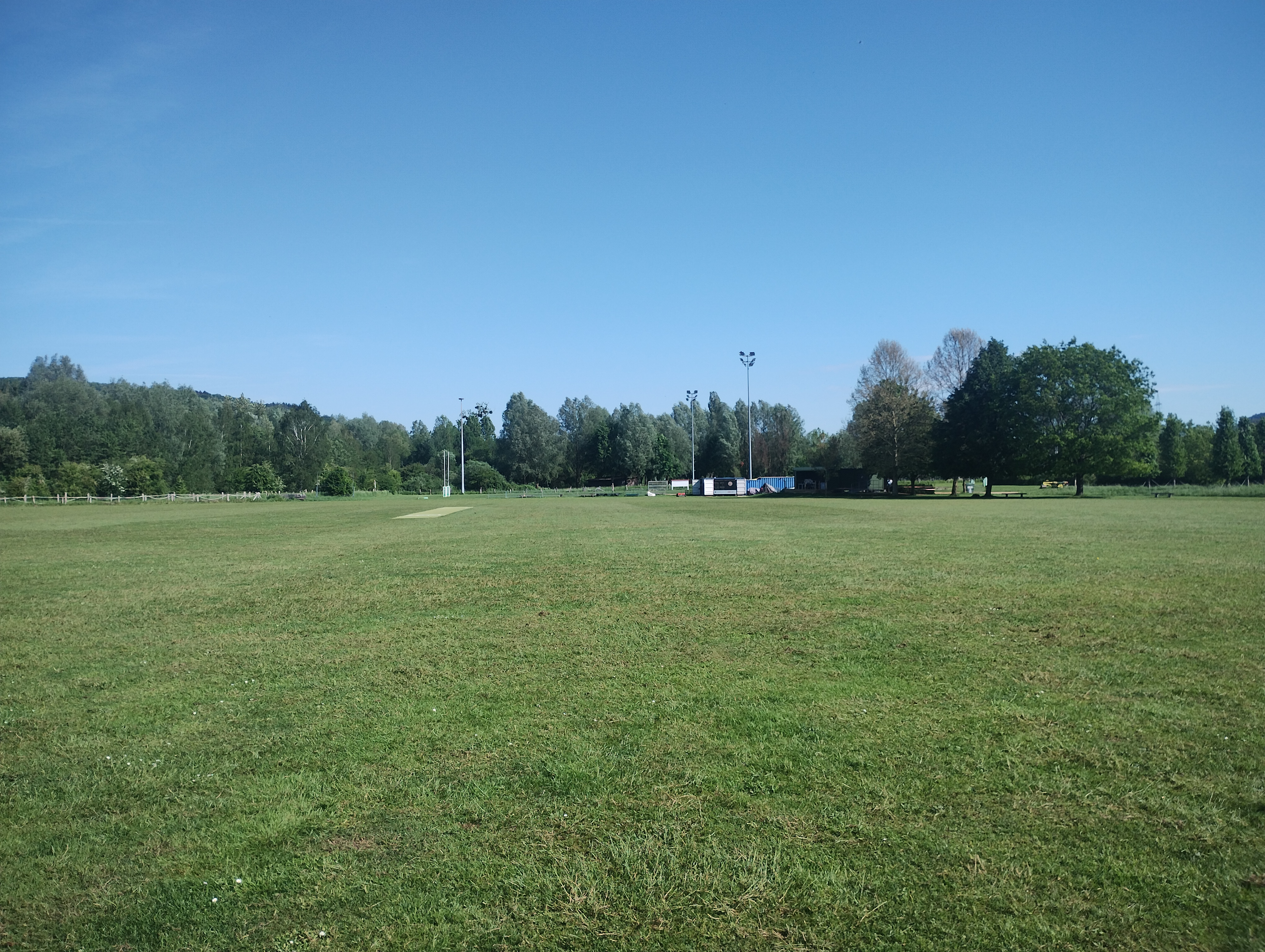
- Pierre Werner Cricket Ground in 2024
- Interactive map of Pierre Werner Cricket Ground

Ground information
- Location: rue de l'Alzette, Walferdange, Luxembourg
- Establishment: 1991
- Capacity: 1,000
- Owner: Optimists Cricket Club
- Operator: Optimists Cricket Club
- Tenants: Optimists Cricket Club; Luxembourg national team
- End names
- Bridge End; Pavilion End

International information
- First men's T20I: 28 August 2020: Luxembourg v Czech Republic
- Last men's T20I: 25 June 2023: Luxembourg v Switzerland
- First women's T20I: 12 September 2025: Luxembourg v Switzerland
- Last women's T20I: 14 September 2025: Luxembourg v Switzerland
- As of 25 June 2023; Source: Cricinfo

The Pierre Werner Cricket Ground, also known as the Walferdange Cricket Ground, is a cricket ground in Walferdange, in central Luxembourg. It is the premier cricket venue in Luxembourg, being the home ground of the country's top club, the Optimists Cricket Club, which plays in the Belgian Cricket League, and of the Luxembourg national team.

The ground was opened in 1991. In 2002 the ground was given its present name to commemorate Pierre Werner (1913–2002), formerly Prime Minister of Luxembourg and honorary president of Optimists Cricket Club. The ground was established on land donated by the Walferdange commune, adjacent to the Alzette river.

The ground has hosted matches between the Luxembourg national team and various other teams, including the Belgium national team and the MCC. The heavy use of the ground is illustrated by the programme in 2003, when it "was in use almost every day between mid-April and early October". That year two internationals against France and one against Belgium were played on the ground (though one of the games against France was rained off). A six-a-side tournament was hosted in 2007.

The ground is the only outdoor venue regularly used for cricket in Luxembourg, with the only other venue being Robert Schuman Oval, located 300 m (980 ft) over the French border in Évrange. The ground's pitch is artificial matting on concrete.

The ground hosts a one-week junior training academy each July. In 2010 this was attended by forty boys and girls of all ages, who were coached by a Level 3 coach from the UK and benefited from the ground's "excellent facilities".

In August 2020, the ground was selected to host the 2020 Luxembourg T20I Trophy, a tri-series between Luxembourg, Belgium and the Czech Republic. In 2026, the ground hosted a Women's T20 series between Luxembourg and Belgium.

== List of International Centuries ==
=== Twenty20 Internationals ===
This is the list of centuries scored at the ground in Twenty20 Internationals.

No.	Score	Player	Team	Balls	Inns.	Opposing team	Date	Result
1	125*	Shaheryar Butt	Belgium	50	1	Czech Republic	29 August 2020	Won
