= Walferdange =

Walferdange Walfer (Luxembourgish)
- Commune
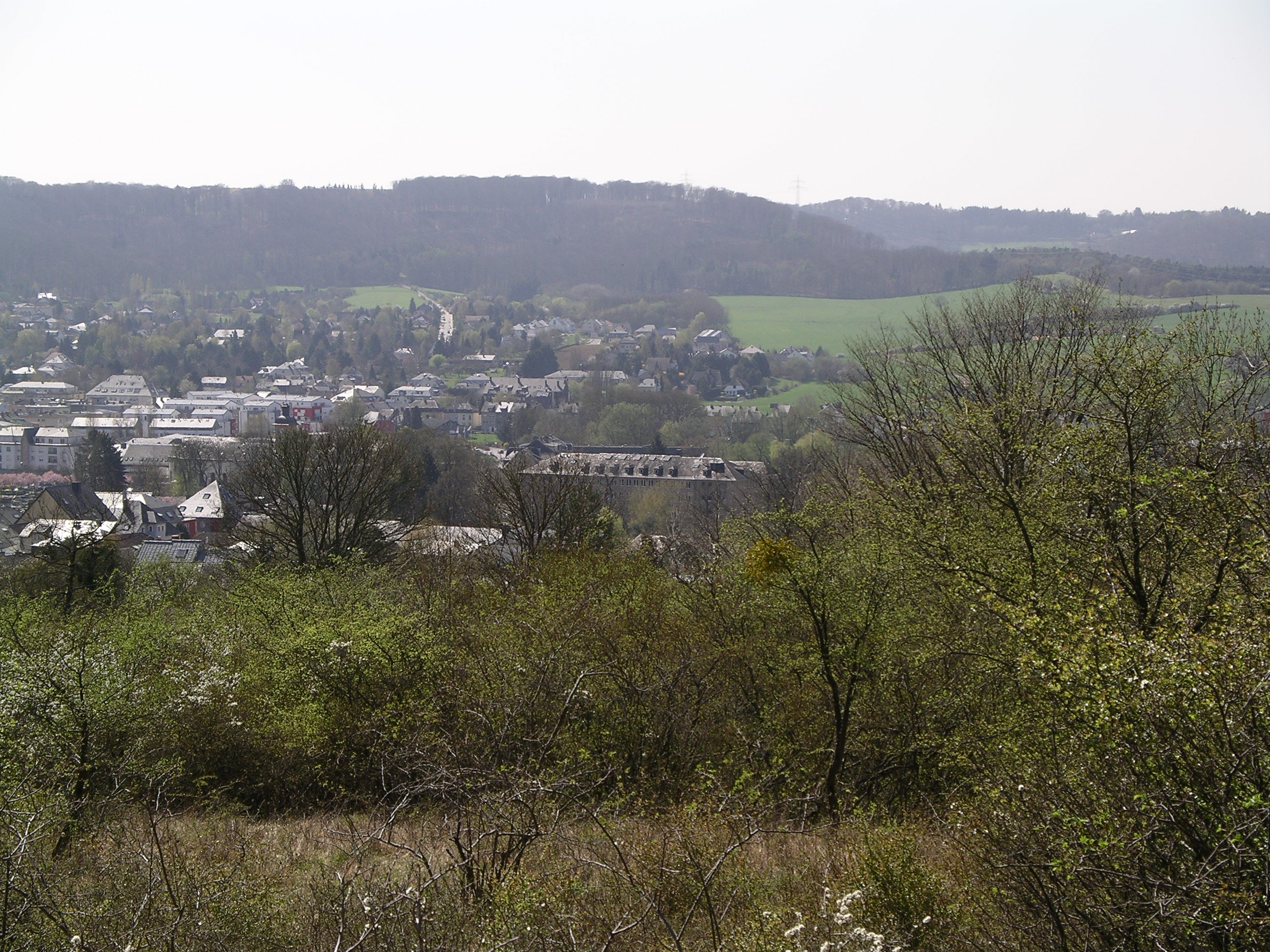
- View from Sonnebierg

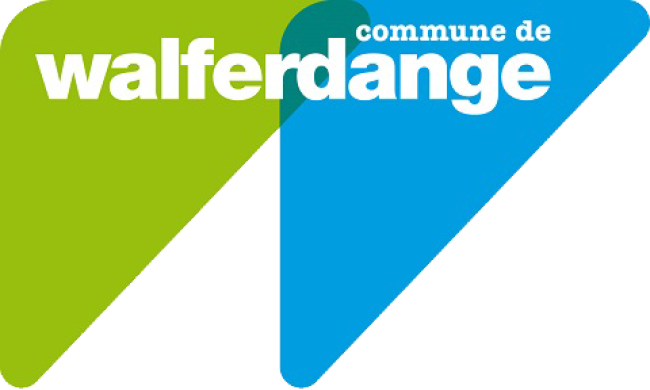
- Coat of arms Brandmark

- Map of Luxembourg with Walferdange highlighted in orange, and the canton in dark red
- Coordinates: 49.6628°N 6.1333°E
- Country: Luxembourg
- Canton: Luxembourg

Government
  - Mayor: François Sauber (CSV)

Area
  - Total: 7.06 km^{2} (2.73 sq mi)
  - Rank: 100th of 100
- Highest elevation: 405 m (1,329 ft)
  - Rank: 46th of 100
- Lowest elevation: 228 m (748 ft)
  - Rank: 41st of 100

Population (2026)
  - Total: 9,415
  - Rank: 17th of 100
  - Density: 1,330/km^{2} (3,450/sq mi)
  - Rank: 6th of 100
- Time zone: UTC+1 (CET)
  - Summer (DST): UTC+2 (CEST)
- LAU 2: LU0000310
- Website: walfer.lu

Walferdange (French pronunciation: [valfɛʁdɑ̃ʒ]; Luxembourgish: Walfer [ˈvɑlfɐ]; German: Walferdingen [ˈvalfɐdɪŋən]) is a commune and small town in central Luxembourg.

== Geography ==
The commune of Walferdange is located north of Luxembourg City in the valley of the Alzette. It is part of the canton Luxembourg.

The town of Walferdange, which has a population of 1106 as of September 2026, lies in the center of the commune. Other towns within the commune include Helmsange and Bereldange.

== History ==
The commune of Walferdange was formed on 1 January 1851, when it was detached from the commune of Steinsel. The law forming Walferdange was passed on 25 November 1850.

Although the commune first came into existence in 1851, there is evidence of prehistoric settlement as well as remains of a very large Roman villa. The Raschpëtzer Qanat, an underground aqueduct near Helmsange was built in the 1st century AD during the Roman occupation. It is said to be the longest qanat north of the Alps.

Walferdange church was built between 1845 and 1852; the main features of its classical facade are two large statues of Père Kolbe and Thérèse de Lisieux, added at a later date. Before official unification of the commune, and even before this church was built, it was religion that pulled the villages of Heisdorf, Helmsange, Bereldange and Walferdange together.

Recognition of Walferdange as an important town came in 1850, when Prince Henry, brother of Grand Duke William III and Regent of Luxembourg, chose Walferdange as his seat of residence. After the independence of the Grand Duchy of Luxembourg in 1867, the Walferdange Castle was assigned to Grand Duke Adolphe according to the constitution. As an engaged winemaker, he enthusiastically served his guests wine from his own production. The palace was later vacated by the Grand Ducal family.

On 26 March 1943, during the German occupation of Luxembourg, Nazi authorities merged the commune of Walferdange into Luxembourg City, alongside Strassen and parts of Hesperange. This enlargement of city boundaries only lasted until the liberation of Luxembourg on 10 September 1944, when the previous boundaries were restored and Walferdange once again became a separate commune.

== Places of interest ==
Sights include the Roman villa and the underground aqueduct Raschpëtzer Qanat, as well as the Walferdange Castle. Until 2015 the residential palace housed the Faculty of Languages and Literature, Humanities, Art and Behavioral Sciences of the University of Luxembourg.

== Sports ==
Walferdange is home for to sport clubs, including BBC Résidence (basketball), RSR Walfer (volleyball), De Renert (rugby union), FC Résidence Walferdange (football), Tennis Club Résidence Walfer (tennis) a Optimists Cricket Club (cricket), and Karate Club Walferdange (karate).

=== Cricket ===
The Pierre Werner Cricket Ground, also known as the Walferdange Cricket Ground, is situated in Helmsange next to the Alzette river. The cricket ground is the premier cricket venue in Luxembourg, being the home ground of the country's top club, the Optimists Cricket Club (OCC). It is named after the Pierre Werner, former Prime Minister of Luxembourg (1959–74, 1979–84). Werner had fallen in love with cricket when living in London in 1930, and went on to become the Honorary President of the OCC, which had been established when he was Prime Minister. Werner opened the OCC's new ground in 1992.

=== Pidal ===
Walferdange is home to PIDAL (Piscine intercommunale de l’Alzette), a swimming pool that includes a spa area, a sauna, a fitness room and a restaurant.

The facility is managed by the communes of Lorentzweiler, Steinsel and Walferdange.

== Culture ==
The Harmonie Grand-Ducale Marie-Adélaïde (Walfer Musek), named after Marie-Adélaïde, Grand Duchess of Luxembourg, has been founded in 1912.

== Population ==
According to the website of the municipality, Walferdange has about 8,600 inhabitants at the beginning of 2025. More than 51% are foreigners of about 103 different nationalities.

Historical population

Year	Pop.	±%
1821	594	—
1851	854	+43.8%
1900	941	+10.2%
1910	1,015	+7.9%
1922	1,121	+10.4%
1935	1,726	+54.0%

Year	Pop.	±%
1947	2,132	+23.5%
1960	3,008	+41.1%
1970	4,279	+42.3%
1981	5,300	+23.9%
1990	5,853	+10.4%
2000	6,459	+10.4%

Year	Pop.	±%
2005	6,639	+2.8%
2010	7,291	+9.8%
2015	7,819	+7.2%
2020	8,424	+7.7%
2021	8,418	−0.1%
2022	8,552	+1.6%

Source data

Population by canton and municipality 1821 - 2015 filtered for Walferdange
Specification	1821	1851	1871	1880	1890	1900	1910	1922	1930	1935	1947	1960	1970	1981	1990	2000	2010	2011	2012	2013	2014	2015
Grand Duchy of Luxembourg	134082	194719	204028	210507	211481	236125	259027	261643	299872	296913	290992	314889	339841	364597	379300	435479	502066	512353	524853	537039	549680	562958
Walferdange	594	854	1020	885	892	941	1015	1121	1500	1726	2132	3008	4279	5300	5853	6459	7291	7240	7404	7563	7715	7819

== Transport ==
The commune is served by Walferdange railway station on CFL Line 10, by the N7 national road, and several buslines, including the city of Luxembourg buslines (AVL) 11 and 10.

The commune also has its own mini-bus service known as "Walfy-Flexibus".

== Twin towns ==
Walferdange is twinned with:

- Schmitshausen, Germany
- Longuyon, France
- Limana, Italy
