= List of Twenty20 cricket records =

This is a list of Twenty20 men's cricket records, that is a record team or individual performances in Twenty20 cricket (T20). The records only include top-level T20 games: those played in officially recognized tournaments in ICC Full-member countries or any Twenty20 International.

== Team records ==
=== Highest total ===
Rank	Score	Team	Opponent	Venue	Date
1	349/5	(India) Baroda	(India) Sikkim	Emerald High School Ground, Indore, India	5 December 2024
2	344/4	Zimbabwe	Gambia	Ruaraka Sports Club Ground, Nairobi, Kenya	23 October 2024
3	322/7	Austria	Hungary	GB Oval, Sződliget, Hungary	28 June 2026
4	314/3	Nepal	Mongolia	Zhejiang University of Technology Cricket Field, Hangzhou, China	27 September 2023
5	313/2	Nepal	China	Singapore National Cricket Ground, Singapore	31 May 2026
Source: ESPNcricinfo updated 28 June 2026

=== Lowest innings totals ===
Completed innings only.

Rank	Score	Team	Opponent	Venue	Date
1	7	Ivory Coast	Nigeria	Tafawa Balewa Square Cricket Oval, Lagos	24 November 2024
2	10	Mongolia	Singapore	UKM-YSD Cricket Oval, Bangi, Malaysia	5 September 2024
2	10	Isle of Man	Spain	La Manga Club Ground, Cartagena, Spain	26 February 2023
4	12	Mongolia	Japan	Sano International Cricket Ground, Sano, Japan	8 May 2024
5	13	Mongolia	Thailand	Bayuemas Oval, Kuala Lumpur, Malaysia	9 October 2026
Source: ESPNcricinfo updated 9 October 2026.

=== Highest winning margin (by runs) ===
Rank	Winner	Margin	Target	Opponent	Venue	Date
1	Zimbabwe	290 runs	344	Gambia	Ruaraka Sports Club Ground, Nairobi, Kenya	23 October 2024
2	Nepal	273 runs	315	Mongolia	Zhejiang University of Technology Cricket Field, Hangzhou, China	27 September 2023
3	Rwanda	271 runs	289	Ivory Coast	Botswana Cricket Association Oval 1, Gaborone, Botswana	24 May 2026
4	Nigeria	264 runs	272	Ivory Coast	Tafawa Balewa Square Cricket Oval, Lagos	24 November 2024
5	(India) Baroda	263 runs	350	(India) Sikkim	Emerald High School Ground, Indore, India	5 December 2024
Source: ESPNcricinfo updated 24 May 2026

=== Highest winning margin (by wickets) ===
As of October 2026, there have been 269 instances of a team winning by 10 wickets.

=== Highest match aggregate ===
Rank	Score	Teams	Venue	Date
1	549/10 (40 overs)	(India) Sunrisers Hyderabad (287/3) v (India) Royal Challengers Bengaluru (262/7)	M. Chinnaswamy Stadium, Bengaluru, India	15 April 2024
2	536/13 (38.4 overs)	(United States) MI New York (266/9) v (United States) Washington Freedom (270/4)	Oakland Coliseum, Oakland, United States	15 July 2026
3	529/6 (38.5 overs)	(India) Delhi Capitals (264/2) v (India) Punjab Kings (265/4)	Arun Jaitley Stadium, Delhi, India	25 April 2026
4	528/12 (40 overs)	(India) Sunrisers Hyderabad (286/6) v (India) Rajasthan Royals (242/6)	Rajiv Gandhi International Cricket Stadium, Hyderabad, India	23 March 2025
5	523/8 (38.4 overs)	(India) Kolkata Knight Riders (261/6) v (India) Punjab Kings (262/2)	Eden Gardens, Kolkata, India	26 April 2024
5	523/8 (40 overs)	(India) Sunrisers Hyderabad (277/3) v (India) Mumbai Indians (246/5)	Rajiv Gandhi International Cricket Stadium, Hyderabad, India	27 March 2024
Source: ESPNcricinfo Updated 15 July 2026

=== Most sixes in an innings ===
Rank	Sixes	Batting Team	Opposition	Venue	Date	Scorecard
1	37	(India) Baroda	(India) Sikkim	Emerald High School Ground, Indore, India	5 December 2024	Scorecard
2	29	Spain	Croatia	La Manga Club Top Ground, Cartagena, Spain	7 December 2025	Scorecard
2	29	Nepal	China	Singapore National Cricket Ground, Singapore	31 May 2026	Scorecard
2	29	(United States) MI New York	(United States) Washington Freedom	Oakland Coliseum, Oakland, United States	15 July 2026	Scorecard
5	28	(United States) San Francisco Unicorns	(United States) Washington Freedom	Oakland Coliseum, Oakland, United States	12 June 2025	Scorecard
5	28	(India) Punjab	(India) Bengal	Gymkhana Ground, Hyderabad, India	30 November 2025	Scorecard
Updated: 15 July 2026

=== Most fours in an innings ===
Rank	Fours	Batting Team	Opposition	Venue	Date	Scorecard
1	34	(India) Sunrisers Hyderabad	(India) Rajasthan Royals	Rajiv Gandhi International Cricket Stadium, Hyderabad, India	23 March 2025	Scorecard
2	33	(England) Middlesex	(England) Surrey	Kennington Oval, London, England	22 June 2023	Scorecard
3	32	Czech Republic	Serbia	Vinoř Cricket Ground (Scott Page Field), Prague, Czech Republic	27 June 2026	Scorecard
4	31	5 occasions				
Updated: 27 June 2026

=== Most sixes in a match ===
Rank	Sixes	Teams	Venue	Date	Scorecard
1	51	(United States) MI New York (29) v (United States) Washington Freedom (22)	Oakland Coliseum, Oakland, United States	15 July 2026	Scorecard
2	42	(India) Punjab Kings (24) v (India) Kolkata Knight Riders (18)	Eden Gardens, Kolkata, India	26 April 2024	Scorecard
2	42	(Cricket West Indies) Guyana Amazon Warriors (23) v (Cricket West Indies) St Kitts and Nevis Patriots (19)	Warner Park, Basseterre, St Kitts and Nevis	4 September 2024	Scorecard
4	41	Bulgaria (23) v Gibraltar (18)	Vasil Levski National Sports Academy, Sofia, Bulgaria	11 July 2025	Scorecard
4	41	(India) Punjab (28) v (India) Bengal (13)	Gymkhana Ground, Hyderabad, India	30 November 2025	Scorecard
Updated: 15 July 2026

=== Most fours in a match ===
Rank	Fours	Teams	Venue	Date	Scorecard
1	55	(England) Somerset (31) v (England) Glamorgan (24)	Sophia Gardens, Cardiff, England	18 June 2003	Scorecard
1	55	(India) Mumbai (30) v (India) Haryana (25)	D Y Patil Academy, Ambi, Pune, India	14 December 2025	Scorecard
3	54	(Pakistan) Quetta Gladiators (30) v (Pakistan) Peshawar Zalmi (24)	Rawalpindi Cricket Stadium, Rawalpindi, Pakistan	8 March 2023	Scorecard
4	53	(India) Delhi (27) v (India) Services (26)	Arun Jaitley Cricket Stadium, Delhi, India	16 January 2018	Scorecard
5	52	(England) Middlesex (33) v (England) Surrey (19)	The Oval, London, England	22 June 2023	Scorecard
5	52	(Pakistan) Multan Sultans (27) v (Pakistan) Islamabad United (25)	Rawalpindi Cricket Stadium, Rawalpindi, Pakistan	10 March 2024	Scorecard
5	52	(India) Goa (30) v (India) Mumbai (22)	Gymkhana Ground, Hyderabad, India	23 November 2024	Scorecard
Updated: 14 December 2025

== Individual records (batting) ==
=== Most career runs ===
Rank	Runs	Innings	Player	Average	100	50	4s	6s	Period
1	15,062	498	(England) Jos Buttler†	35.60	9	108	1,370	661	2009–2026
2	14,999	671	(Cricket West Indies) Kieron Pollard†	31.71	2	71	939	1,013	2006–2026
3	14,581	531	(England) Alex Hales†	29.69	7	93	1,567	604	2009–2026
4	14,562	455	(Cricket West Indies) Chris Gayle	36.22	22	88	1,132	1,056	2005–2022
5	14,284	438	(Australia) David Warner†	37.29	10	118	1,464	505	2007–2026
Source: ESPNcricinfo, Last updated: 19 September 2026

=== Most runs in each batting position ===
Batting position	Batsman	Innings	Runs	Average	Span	Ref
Number 1	(England) Jason Roy†	309	8,575	28.96	2011–2026	
Number 2	(England) Alex Hales†	399	11,084	30.28	2009–2026	
Number 3	(India) Suresh Raina	247	7,164	33.63	2008–2021	
Number 4	(Pakistan) Shoaib Malik	246	6,912	38.18	2005–2025	
Number 5	(South Africa) David Miller†	228	5,571	38.68	2008–2026	
Number 6	(Cricket West Indies) Kieron Pollard†	223	5,342	35.37	2008–2026	
Number 7	(Cricket West Indies) Andre Russell†	130	2,708	28.80	2010–2026	
Number 8	(Afghanistan) Rashid Khan†	169	1,565	14.9	2016–2026	
Number 9	(Pakistan) Wahab Riaz	52	418	12.29	2006–2023	
Number 10	(England) Adil Rashid†	43	237	12.47	2009–2026	
Number 11	(South Africa) Imran Tahir†	45	185	13.21	2006–2026	
Last updated: 7 October 2026.

=== Highest individual score ===
Rank	Runs	Player	Team	Opponent	Venue	Date
1	188*	(South Africa) Lhuan-dre Pretorius	Titans	Knights	Mangaung Oval, Bloemfontein, South Africa	2 October 2026
2	175*	(Cricket West Indies) Chris Gayle	Royal Challengers Bangalore	Pune Warriors India	M. Chinnaswamy Stadium, Bengaluru, India	23 April 2013
3	172	(Australia) Aaron Finch	Australia	Zimbabwe	Harare Sports Club, Harare, Zimbabwe	3 July 2018
4	164*	(Rwanda) Hamza Khan	Rwanda	Ivory Coast	Botswana Cricket Association Oval 1, Gaborone, Botswana	24 May 2026
4	164	(Austria) Karanbir Singh	Austria	Hungary	GB Oval, Sződliget, Hungary	28 June 2026
Source: ESPNcricinfo Last Updated: 3 October 2026.

=== Highest individual score (Progression of Record) ===
Runs	Batsman	Batting team	Opposition	Venue	Date	Scorecard
70 (52)	(England) Keith Dutch	Somerset	Warwickshire	County Ground, Taunton, England	13 June 2003	Scorecard
97 (61)	(Australia) Brad Hodge	Leicestershire	Yorkshire	Grace Road, Leicester, England	16 June 2003	Scorecard
100* (50)	(Australia) Ian Harvey	Gloucestershire	Warwickshire	Edgbaston Cricket Ground, Edgbaston, England	23 June 2003	Scorecard
112 (43)	(Australia) Andrew Symonds	Kent	Middlesex	Mote Park, Maidstone, England	2 July 2004	Scorecard
116* (57)	(England) Ian Thomas	Glamorgan	Somerset	County Ground, Taunton, England	5 July 2004	Scorecard
116* (65)	(England) Graeme Hick	Worcestershire	Northamptonshire	Wardown Park, Luton, England	5 July 2004	Scorecard
116* (53)	(Australia) Cameron White	Somerset	Gloucestershire	County Ground, Taunton, England	27 June 2006	Scorecard
141* (70)	(Australia) Cameron White	Somerset	Worcestershire	New Road, Worcester, England	9 July 2006	Scorecard
158* (73)	(New Zealand) Brendon McCullum	Kolkata Knight Riders	Royal Challengers Bangalore	M. Chinnaswamy Stadium, Bengaluru, India	18 April 2008	Scorecard
175* (66)	(Cricket West Indies) Chris Gayle	Royal Challengers Bangalore	Pune Warriors	M. Chinnaswamy Stadium, Bengaluru, India	23 April 2013	Scorecard
188* (79)	(South Africa) Lhuan-dre Pretorius	Titans	Knights	Mangaung Oval, Bloemfontein, South Africa	2 October 2026	Scorecard
Updated: 2 October 2026

=== Highest individual score (by batting position) ===
Position	Runs	Batsman	Batting team	Opposition	Venue	Date	Scorecard
Openers	188*	(South Africa) Lhuan-dre Pretorius	Titans	Knights	Mangaung Oval, Bloemfontein, South Africa	2 October 2026	
Position 3	152*	(England) Graham Napier	Essex	Sussex	County Cricket Ground, Chelmsford, England	24 June 2008	
Position 4	146*	(India) Puneet Bisht	Meghalaya	Mizoram	Guru Nanak College Ground, Chennai, India	13 January 2021	
Position 5	129	(Australia) Dan Christian	Middlesex	Kent	St Lawrence Ground, Canterbury, England	6 June 2014	
Position 6	125*	(Belgium) Shaheryar Butt	Belgium	Czech Republic	Pierre Werner Cricket Ground, Walferdange, Luxembourg	29 August 2020	
Position 7	121*	(Cricket West Indies) Andre Russell	Jamaica Tallawahs	Trinbago Knight Riders	Queen's Park Oval, Port of Spain, Trinidad and Tobago	10 August 2018	
Position 8	100*	(Belgium) Saber Zakhil	Belgium	Austria	Royal Brussels Cricket Club, Waterloo, Belgium	24 July 2021	
Position 9	79*	(England) Craig Overton	Somerset	Yorkshire	Headingley Cricket Ground, Leeds, England	15 July 2026	
Position 10	58	(Sri Lanka) Manjula Jayawardene	Police Sports Club	Colts Cricket Club	Moors Sports Club Ground, Colombo, Sri Lanka	15 February 2019	
Position 11	35*	(England) Danny Briggs	Adelaide Strikers	Hobart Hurricanes	Bellerive Oval, Hobart, Australia	13 December 2020	
Updated: 3 October 2026

=== Most 50+ scores ===
Rank	50+	Player	Innings	100	50	Runs	Period
1	128	(Australia) David Warner†	438	10	118	14,284	2007–2026
2	120	(India) Virat Kohli†	413	10	110	14,218	2007–2026
3	117	(England) Jos Buttler†	498	9	108	15,062	2009–2026
4	114	(Pakistan) Babar Azam†	346	13	101	12,493	2012–2026
5	110	(Cricket West Indies) Chris Gayle	455	22	88	14,562	2005–2022
Last Updated: 5 October 2026

=== Most half-centuries in career ===
Rank	Half-centuries	Player	Innings	Runs	Period
1	118	(Australia) David Warner†	438	14,284	2007–2026
2	110	(India) Virat Kohli†	413	14,218	2007–2026
3	108	(England) Jos Buttler†	498	15,062	2009–2026
4	101	(Pakistan) Babar Azam†	346	12,493	2012–2026
5	93	(England) Alex Hales†	531	14,581	2009–2026
Source: ESPNcricinfo.com, Last updated: 19 September 2026

=== Most centuries in a career ===
Rank	Centuries	Player	Innings	Runs	Period
1	22	(Cricket West Indies) Chris Gayle	455	14,562	2009–2022
2	13	(Pakistan) Babar Azam†	346	12,493	2012–2026
3	11	(India) Abhishek Sharma†	216	6,606	2018–2026
4	10	(India) Virat Kohli†	413	14,218	2007–2026
4	10	(Australia) David Warner†	438	14,284	2007–2026
4	10	(South Africa) Quinton de Kock†	449	13,046	2011–2026
Source: ESPNcricinfo.com, Last updated: 27 October 2026

=== Fastest 100 ===
Rank	Balls	Player	Team	Opposition	Venue	Date
1	27	(Estonia) Sahil Chauhan	Estonia	Cyprus	Happy Valley Ground, Episkopi, Cyprus	17 June 2024
2	28	(India) Urvil Patel	Gujarat	Tripura	Emerald High School, Indore, India	27 November 2024
2	28	(India) Abhishek Sharma	Punjab	Meghalaya	Niranjan Shah Stadium, Rajkot, India	5 December 2024
4	29	(Turkey) Muhammad Fahad	Turkey	Bulgaria	Vassil Levski National Sports Academy, Sofia, Bulgaria	12 July 2025
5	30	(Cricket West Indies) Chris Gayle	Royal Challengers Bangalore	Pune Warriors India	M. Chinnaswamy Stadium, Bengaluru, India	23 April 2013
5	30	(India) Abhishek Sharma	India	Afghanistan	Arun Jaitley Cricket Stadium, New Delhi, India	17 September 2026
Source: ESPNcricinfo.com, last updated 17 September 2026

=== Fastest 50 ===
Rank	Balls	Player	Team	Opposition	Venue	Date
1	9	(Nepal) Dipendra Singh Airee	Nepal	Mongolia	Zhejiang University of Technology Cricket Field, Hangzhou, China	27 September 2023
2	11	(India) Ashutosh Sharma	Railways	Arunachal Pradesh	JSCA International Stadium Complex, Ranchi, India	17 October 2023
3	12	(India) Yuvraj Singh	India	England	Kingsmead Cricket Ground, Durban, South Africa	19 September 2007
3	12	(Cricket West Indies) Chris Gayle	Melbourne Renegades	Adelaide Strikers	Docklands Stadium, Melbourne, Australia	18 January 2016
3	12	(Afghanistan) Hazratullah Zazai	Kabul Zwanan	Balkh Legends	Sharjah Cricket Stadium, Sharjah, United Arab Emirates	14 October 2018
3	12	(Estonia) Sahil Chauhan	Estonia	Cyprus	Happy Valley Ground, Episkopi, Cyprus	17 June 2024
3	12	(India) Abhishek Sharma	(India) Punjab	(India) Bengal	Gymkhana Ground, Hyderabad, India	30 November 2025
3	12	(Austria) Abidullah Kotwa	Austria	Hungary	GB Oval, Sződliget, Hungary	28 June 2026
Source: ESPNcricinfo.com, last updated 27 July 2026

=== Fastest to multiples of 1000 runs ===
Runs	Batsman	Match	Innings	Record Date	Time	Reference
1,000	(Australia) Brad Hodge	23	23	9 July 2006	3y 23d	
1,000	(Australia) Shaun Marsh	23	23	20 June 2008	2y 166d	
2,000	(Austria) Karanbir Singh	46	45	2 May 2026	1y 342d	
3,000	(India) Sai Sudharsan	79	78	16 May 2026	4y 193d	
4,000	(Cricket West Indies) Chris Gayle	109	107	30 June 2012	6y 289d	
5,000	(Cricket West Indies) Chris Gayle	135	132	16 April 2013	7y 213d	
6,000	(Cricket West Indies) Chris Gayle	165	162	28 April 2014	8y 225d	
7,000	(Pakistan) Babar Azam	196	187	3 October 2021	8y 306d	
8,000	(Cricket West Indies) Chris Gayle	217	213	7 July 2015	9y 295d	
9,000	(Pakistan) Babar Azam	254	245	16 March 2023	10y 105d	
10,000	(Pakistan) Babar Azam	281	271	21 February 2024	11y 82d	
11,000	(Pakistan) Babar Azam	309	298	13 December 2024	12y 12d	
12,000	(Pakistan) Babar Azam	351	338	9 April 2026	13y 129d	
13,000	(Cricket West Indies) Chris Gayle	388	381	15 September 2019	14y 0d	-
14,000	(India) Virat Kohli	426	409	13 May 2026	19y 40d	-
15,000	(England) Jos Buttler	528	497	17 September 2026	16y 334d	-
Last updated: 19 September 2026

=== Highest career strike rate ===
Qualification: 1,000 balls.

Rank	Strike rate	Player	Runs Scored	Balls faced	Period
1	181.30	(Australia) Mitchell Owen†	1,813	1,000	2021–2026
2	179.26	(India) Abhishek Sharma†	6,606	3,685	2018–2026
3	175.57	(New Zealand) Finn Allen†	6,161	3,509	2017–2026
4	174.28	(Austria) Karanbir Singh†	2,616	1,501	2024–2026
5	173.66	(Saudi Arabia) Faisal Khan†	1,794	1,033	2019–2026
Source: ESPNcricinfo, last updated: 27 October 2026

=== Highest strike rates in an innings ===
Rank	Strike rate	Player	Score	Team	Opposition	Venue	Date
1	533.33	(Sri Lanka) Seekkuge Prasanna	32* (6)	Colombo Stars	Kandy Warriors	R Premadasa Stadium, Colombo, Sri Lanka	14 December 2021
2	520.00	(Nepal) Dipendra Singh Airee	52* (10)	Nepal	Mongolia	Zhejiang University of Technology Cricket Field, Hangzhou, China	27 September 2023
3	500.00	(South Africa) Dewald Brevis	30* (6)	St Kitts and Nevis Patriots	Trinbago Knight Riders	Providence Stadium, Georgetown, Guyana	22 September 2022
3	500.00	(Belgium) Ahmad Khalid Ahmadzai	30* (6)	Belgium	Romania	Moara Vlasiei Cricket Ground, Ilfov County, Romania	19 June 2026
3	500.00	(South Africa) Wayne Parnell	25* (5)	KwaZulu-Natal Inland	Lions	Wanderers Stadium, Johannesburg, South Africa	8 November 2025
Qualification: Minimum 25 runs scored. Last Updated: 20 June 2026

=== Highest career average ===
Qualification: 2,000 runs.

Rank	Average	Player	Innings	Runs	Not outs	100s	50s	Period
1	45.89	(Austria) Karanbir Singh†	64	2,616	7	4	20	2024–2026
2	43.63	(India) Sai Sudharshan†	82	3,185	9	4	23	2021–2026
3	42.98	(Malawi) Sami Sohail†	71	2,192	20	0	14	2019–2026
4	42.78	(Pakistan) Babar Azam†	346	12,493	54	13	101	2012–2026
5	42.73	(India) KL Rahul†	240	8,718	36	8	73	2013–2026
Source: ESPNcricinfo, Last updated: 28 August 2026

=== Highest batting average in each batting position ===
Batting position	Batsman	Innings	Runs	Average	Span	Ref
Number 1	(India) Sai Sudharsan†	39	1,863	51.75	2022–2026	
Number 2	(India) Virat Kohli†	86	3,490	49.15	2008–2026	
Number 3	(Australia) Michael Hussey	29	979	48.95	2003–2016	
Number 4	(Pakistan) Hassan Nawaz†	31	1,227	51.12	2025–2026	
Number 5	(South Africa) JP Duminy	58	1,538	51.26	2004–2019	
Number 6	(Namibia) JJ Smit†	29	646	43.06	2015–2026	
Number 7	(South Africa) Vernon Philander	35	501	35.78	2005–2019	
Number 8	(South Africa) Ryan McLaren	25	227	37.83	2005–2017	
Number 9	(England) Craig Overton†	26	362	27.84	2014–2026	
Number 10	(India) Dhawal Kulkarni	26	150	15.00	2008–2021	
Number 11	(Australia) Dirk Nannes	28	33	16.50	2007–2015	
Qualification: 25 Innings. Last updated: 10 September 2026.

=== Most career sixes ===
Rank	Sixes	Player	Innings	Sixes Per Innings	Runs	Period
1	1,056	(Cricket West Indies) Chris Gayle	455	2.32	14,562	2005–2022
2	1,001	(Cricket West Indies) Kieron Pollard†	663	1.50	14,803	2006–2026
3	792	(Cricket West Indies) Andre Russell†	517	1.53	9,776	2010–2026
4	773	(Cricket West Indies) Nicholas Pooran†	446	1.73	11,161	2013–2026
5	650	(England) Jos Buttler†	492	1.32	14,833	2009–2026
Source: Cricinfo.com, Last updated: 27 July 2026

=== Most sixes in an innings ===
Rank	Sixes	Player	Team	Opponent	Venue	Date
1	19	(New Zealand) Finn Allen	San Francisco Unicorns	Washington Freedom	Oakland Coliseum, Oakland, United States	12 June 2025
2	18	(Cricket West Indies) Chris Gayle	Rangpur Riders	Dhaka Dynamites	Sher-e-Bangla National Cricket Stadium, Mirpur, Bangladesh	12 December 2017
2	18	(Estonia) Sahil Chauhan	Estonia	Cyprus	Happy Valley Ground, Episkopi, Cyprus	17 June 2024
4	17	(Cricket West Indies) Chris Gayle	Royal Challengers Bangalore	Pune Warriors India	M. Chinnaswamy Stadium, Bangalore, India	23 April 2013
4	17	(India) Puneet Bisht	Meghalaya	Mizoram	Guru Nanak College Ground, Chennai, India	13 January 2021
4	17	(Spain) Mohammad Ihsan	Spain	Croatia	La Manga Club Top Ground, Cartagena	7 December 2025
Source: Cricinfo.com, Last updated: 7 December 2025

=== Most career fours ===
Rank	Fours	Player	Innings	Fours Per Innings	Period
1	1,579	(England) James Vince†	486	3.24	2010–2026
2	1,564	(England) Alex Hales†	529	2.95	2009–2026
3	1,464	(Australia) David Warner†	438	3.34	2007–2026
4	1,351	(England) Jos Buttler†	495	2.72	2009–2026
5	1,305	(Pakistan) Babar Azam†	346	3.77	2012–2026
Source: Cricinfo.com, Last updated: 5 September 2026

=== Most fours in an innings ===
Rank	Fours	Player	Team	Opponent	Venue	Date
1	22	(Australia) Glenn Maxwell	Melbourne Stars	Hobart Hurricanes	Melbourne Cricket Ground, Melbourne, Australia	19 January 2022
2	20	(Pakistan) Ahmed Shehzad	Lahore Lions	Bahawalpur Stags	Gaddafi Stadium, Lahore, Pakistan	8 December 2012
2	20	(England) Adam Lyth	Yorkshire	Northamptonshire	Headingley Cricket Ground, Leeds, England	17 August 2017
2	20	(England) Jason Roy	Quetta Gladiators	Peshawar Zalmi	Rawalpindi Cricket Stadium, Rawalpindi, Pakistan	8 March 2023
5	19	(India) Paul Valthaty	Kings XI Punjab	Chennai Super Kings	Punjab Cricket Association Stadium, Mohali, India	13 April 2011
5	19	(South Africa) AB de Villiers	Royal Challengers Bangalore	Mumbai Indians	Wankhede Stadium, Mumbai, India	10 May 2015
5	19	(Zimbabwe) Brendan Taylor	Mid West Rhinos	Mashonaland Eagles	Old Hararians, Harare, Zimbabwe	13 April 2021
Source: Cricinfo.com, Last updated: 9 March 2023

=== Most career boundaries ===
Rank	Boundaries	Player	Innings	Fours	Sixes	Boundaries Per Innings	Period
1	2,188	(Cricket West Indies) Chris Gayle	455	1,132	1,056	4.80	2005–2022
2	2,171	(England) Alex Hales†	531	1,567	604	4.08	2009–2026
3	2,022	(England) Jos Buttler†	497	1,348	650	4.06	2009–2026
4	1,969	(Australia) David Warner†	438	1,464	505	4.49	2007–2026
5	1,963	(England) James Vince†	490	1,595	368	4.00	2010–2026
Source: Cricinfo.com, Last updated: 19 September 2026

=== Most runs in a calendar year ===
Rank	Runs	Player	Matches	Innings	Average	100s/50s	Year
1	2,331	(Cricket West Indies) Nicholas Pooran	76	74	40.89	1/15	2024
2	2,036	(Pakistan) Mohammad Rizwan	48	45	56.55	1/18	2021
3	1,970	(South Africa) Reeza Hendricks	71	69	32.29	1/17	2024
4	1,946	(England) Alex Hales	61	61	34.14	0/17	2022
5	1,918	(Cricket West Indies) Nicholas Pooran	63	61	39.95	1/15	2025
Source:, Last updated: 31 December 2025

=== Most runs in a series ===
Rank	Runs	Batsman	Team	Matches	Innings	Series
1	973	(India) Virat Kohli	Royal Challengers Bangalore	16	16	2016 Indian Premier League
2	890	(India) Shubman Gill	Gujarat Titans	17	17	2023 Indian Premier League
3	863	(England) Jos Buttler	Rajasthan Royals	17	17	2022 Indian Premier League
4	848	(Australia) David Warner	Sunrisers Hyderabad	17	17	2016 Indian Premier League
5	776	(India) Vaibhav Sooryavanshi	Rajasthan Royals	16	16	2026 Indian Premier League
Source: ESPNcricinfo.com, Last updated: 31 May 2024

=== Most ducks in career ===
Rank	Ducks	Player	Matches	Innings	Period
1	54	(Cricket West Indies) Sunil Narine†	607	387	2011–2026
2	49	(Afghanistan) Rashid Khan†	544	320	2015–2026
3	46	(England) Alex Hales†	528	523	2009–2026
4	41	(Australia) Glenn Maxwell†	518	481	2010–2026
5	38	(South Africa) Rilee Rossouw†	412	396	2008–2026
Source: ESPNcricinfo.com, last updated 27 July 2026

=== Most consecutive innings without a duck ===
Rank	Innings	Player	From	Until
1	145	(Cricket West Indies) Chris Gayle	10 February 2012	5 February 2016
2	112*	(Australia) Hilton Cartwright†	13 January 2019	18 July 2026
3	110	(South Africa) Matthew Breetzke	7 February 2022	28 June 2026
4	109	(England) Jack Taylor	12 June 2015	13 July 2025
5	108	(India) MS Dhoni	22 May 2015	29 October 2020
Updated: 21 July 2026

=== No ducks in career ===
Rank	Innings	Player	Span
1	76	(South Africa) Mark Boucher	2004–2012
2	63*	(India) Rajat Paliwal†	2013–2024
3	52	(England) Jonathan Batty	2003–2012
4	51*	(Pakistan) Tayyab Tahir†	2015–2025
5	48*	(Botswana) Vinoo Balakrishnan†	2019–2026
Source: ESPNcricinfo.com, last updated: 22 April 2026

=== Most Innings before first duck ===
Rank	Innings	Player	Match Date
1	95	(England) Ben Cox	21 September 2019
2	89	(Pakistan) Shoaib Malik	10 September 2012
3	79	(Australia) Alex Carey	14 July 2021
4	74	(Nepal) Dipendra Singh Airee	13 April 2025
5	73	(South Africa) Donovan Ferreira	27 October 2024
Source: ESPNcricinfo.com, last updated 14 April 2025

== Individual records (bowling) ==
=== Most career wickets ===
Rank	Wickets	Player	Matches	Innings	Average	Strike rate	4 Wkts	5 Wkts	Period
1	736	(Afghanistan) Rashid Khan†	547	542	18.72	16.8	19	5	2015–2026
2	653	(Cricket West Indies) Sunil Narine†	614	604	21.88	21.3	12	1	2011–2026
3	631	(Cricket West Indies) Dwayne Bravo	582	546	24.40	17.7	11	2	2006–2024
4	583	(South Africa) Imran Tahir†	457	440	19.55	16.8	13	5	2006–2026
5	535	(Cricket West Indies) Andre Russell†	607	538	25.57	17.3	10	1	2010–2026
Last updated: 1 September 2026

=== Best figures in a match ===
Rank	Bowling	Player	Team	Opponent	Venue	Date
1	8/7	(Bhutan) Sonam Yeshey	Bhutan	Myanmar	Gelephu International Cricket Ground, Gelephu	26 December 2025
2	7/7	(Kenya) Sachin Gill	Kenya	Cameroon	Botswana Cricket Association Oval 1, Gaborone	28 May 2026
3	7/8	(Malaysia) Syazrul Idrus	Malaysia	China	Bayuemas Oval, Kuala Lumpur, Malaysia	26 July 2023
4	7/18	(Netherlands) Colin Ackermann	Leicestershire	Warwickshire	Grace Road, Leicester, England	7 August 2019
5	7/19	(Bangladesh) Taskin Ahmed	Durbar Rajshahi	Dhaka Capitals	Sher-e-Bangla National Cricket Stadium, Mirpur, Bangladesh	2 January 2025
5	7/19	(Bahrain) Ali Dawood	Bahrain	Bhutan	Gelephu International Cricket Ground, Gelephu	11 December 2025
Last updated: 28 May 2026

=== Best career bowling average ===
Rank	Average	Player	Wickets	Runs	Balls	Period
1	11.33	(Uganda) Alpesh Ramjani†	103	1,168	1,441	2022–2025
2	13.00	(Thailand) Jandre Coetzee†	123	1,600	1,620	2008–2025
3	13.48	(Malaysia) Virandeep Singh†	125	1,686	1,893	2019–2025
4	14.37	(Sri Lanka) Malinda Pushpakumara†	113	1,624	1,498	2012–2026
5	14.74	(Bahrain) Ali Dawood†	120	1,769	1,696	2023–2026
Qualification: 100 wickets Last Updated: 1 September 2026

=== Best career strike rate ===
Rank	Strike rate	Player	Wickets	Runs	Balls	Period
1	13.1	(Thailand) Jandre Coetzee†	123	1,600	1,620	2008–2026
2	13.2	(Sri Lanka) Malinda Pushpakumara†	113	1,624	1,498	2012–2026
3	13.3	(Pakistan) Mohammad Ali†	107	1,927	1,432	2022–2026
4	13.7	(India) Yash Thakur†	114	2,138	1,563	2019–2026
4	13.7	(Pakistan) Abbas Afridi†	132	2,770	1,821	2021–2026
Qualification: 100 wickets Last Updated: 1 September 2026

=== Best career economy rate ===
Rank	Economy rate	Player	Runs	Balls	Wickets	Period
1	4.86	(Uganda) Alpesh Ramjani†	1,168	1,441	103	2022–2025
2	5.45	(Uganda) Henry Ssenyondo†	2,095	2,305	137	2010–2025
3	5.57	(Malaysia) Virandeep Singh†	1,529	1,647	109	2019–2025
4	5.95	(Thailand) Jandre Coetzee†	1,565	1,578	119	2008–2025
5	5.95	(Malaysia) Pavandeep Singh†	1,840	1,853	100	2019–2025
Qualification: 100 wickets Last Updated: 26 January 2026

=== Most four-wickets-in-an-innings (and over) in a career ===
Rank	4+ Wkts	Bowler	Matches	Innings	Wkts	Period
1	23	(Afghanistan) Rashid Khan†	546	541	731	2015–2026
2	18	(South Africa) Imran Tahir†	453	436	577	2006–2026
3	17	(Bangladesh) Shakib Al Hasan†	481	472	518	2006–2026
4	16	(Pakistan) Hasan Ali†	250	248	369	2014–2026
5	15	(Sri Lanka) Lasith Malinga	295	289	390	2004–2020
5	15	(Pakistan) Shadab Khan†	367	348	409	2016–2026
5	15	(Cricket West Indies) Jason Holder†	367	360	402	2010–2026
Last updated: 2 August 2026

=== Most five-wicket hauls in a career ===
Rank	5+ Wkts	Bowler	Matches	Innings	Wkts	Period
1	7	(Namibia) David Wiese†	430	381	353	2008–2026
2	6	(South Africa) Imran Tahir†	461	444	589	2006–2026
3	5	(Pakistan) Shaheen Afridi†	267	266	371	2018–2026
3	5	(Sri Lanka) Lasith Malinga	295	289	390	2004–2020
3	5	(India) Bhuvneshwar Kumar†	332	331	363	2009–2026
3	5	(Bangladesh) Shakib Al Hasan†	483	474	521	2006–2026
3	5	(Afghanistan) Rashid Khan†	547	542	736	2015–2026
Last updated: 10 September 2026

=== Fastest to multiples of 100 wickets ===
Wickets	Bowler	Match	Innings	Record Date	Time	Reference
100						
200						
300	Wanindu Hasaranga	208		23 January 2025		
400	Rashid Khan	289				
500	Rashid Khan	371				
600	Rashid Khan	441		30 July 2024		
700	Rashid Khan	518	513	16 February 2026		

=== Most maidens in a career ===
Rank	Maidens	Bowler	Matches	Innings	Period
1	37	(Cricket West Indies) Sunil Narine†	617	607	2011–2026
2	28	(Pakistan) Mohammad Amir†	378	371	2008–2026
2	28	(Bangladesh) Shakib Al Hasan†	483	474	2006–2026
4	26	(India) Bhuvneshwar Kumar†	332	331	2009–2026
5	23	(India) Jasprit Bumrah†	288	285	2013–2026
Last updated: 7 October 2026

=== Most Wickets in a calendar year ===
Rank	Wickets	Player	Matches	Average	SR	Year
1	97	(Cricket West Indies) Jason Holder	69	21.42	15.4	2025
2	96	(Afghanistan) Rashid Khan	61	15.46	14.6	2018
3	87	(Cricket West Indies) Dwayne Bravo	72	24.47	17.7	2016
4	86	(Afghanistan) Noor Ahmad	62	19.73	15.8	2025
5	81	(Afghanistan) Rashid Khan	66	20.00	18.9	2022
Last updated: 31 December 2025

=== Most runs conceded in a match ===
Rank	Figures	Player	Overs	Bowling Team	Opposition	Venue	Date
1	0/93	(The Gambia) Musa Jobarteh	4.0	Gambia	Zimbabwe	Ruaraka Sports Club Ground, Nairobi, Kenya	23 October 2024
2	0/82	(England) Mattie McKiernan	4.0	Derbyshire	Somerset	County Ground, Taunton, England	9 July 2022
3	0/81	(Pakistan) Sarmad Anwar	4.0	Sialkot Stallions	Lahore Lions	Iqbal Stadium, Faisalabad, Pakistan	25 June 2011
3	0/81	(Republic of Ireland) Liam McCarthy	4.0	Ireland	West Indies	Bready Cricket Club, Bready, Ireland	15 June 2025
3	2/81	(India) Roshan Kumar	4.0	Sikkim	Baroda	Emerald High School Ground, Indore, India	5 December 2024
Last updated: 17 June 2025

=== Most wickets in a series ===
Rank	Wickets	Bowler	Team	Matches	Bowling Average	Series
1	33	(England) David Payne	Gloucestershire	17	12.75	2024 T20 Blast
1	33	(South Africa) Alfonso Thomas	Somerset	19	13.93	2010 Friends Provident t20
3	32	(India) Harshal Patel	Royal Challengers Bangalore	15	14.34	2021 Indian Premier League
3	32	(Cricket West Indies) Dwayne Bravo	Chennai Super Kings	18	15.53	2013 Indian Premier League
5	31	(New Zealand) Matt Henry	Somerset	14	13.25	2023 T20 Blast
5	31	(England) Pat Brown	Worcestershire	16	13.35	2018 Vitality Blast
5	31	(England) Danny Briggs	Hampshire	19	14.35	2010 Friends Provident t20
Last updated: 15 September 2024

== Individual records (wicket-keeping) ==
=== Most dismissals in career as wicket keeper ===
Only dismissals and innings played as wicketkeeper counted, some of the players have also taken catches as fielders.

Rank	Dismissals	Innings	Player	Catches	Stumpings	Diss/Inn	Period
1	370	399	(South Africa) Quinton de Kock†	306	64	0.927	2011–2026
2	317	392	(India) MS Dhoni†	225	92	0.808	2006–2025
3	297	339	(England) Jos Buttler†	240	57	0.876	2009–2026
4	290	349	(India) Dinesh Karthik†	218	72	0.830	2006–2025
5	274	281	(Pakistan) Kamran Akmal	172	102	0.975	2005–2022
Last updated: 8 July 2026

=== Most catches in career by wicket keeper ===
Rank	Catches	Innings	Player	Period
1	306	399	(South Africa) Quinton de Kock†	2011–2026
2	240	339	(England) Jos Buttler†	2009–2026
3	225	392	(India) MS Dhoni†	2006–2025
4	218	349	(India) Dinesh Karthik†	2006–2025
5	190	287	(England) Sam Billings†	2011–2026
Last updated: 8 July 2026

=== Most stumpings in career ===
Rank	Stumpings	Innings	Player	Period
1	102	281	(Pakistan) Kamran Akmal	2005–2022
2	92	392	(India) MS Dhoni†	2006–2025
3	70	349	(India) Dinesh Karthik†	2006–2025
4	63	396	(South Africa) Quinton de Kock†	2011–2026
5	62	173	(Afghanistan) Mohammad Shahzad†	2010–2025
Last updated: 29 June 2026

=== Most dismissals in series as wicket keeper ===
Rank	Dismissals	Innings	Player	Catches	Stumpings	Diss/Inn	Series
1	26	17	(England) Jos Buttler	25	1	1.529	2026 Indian Premier League
2	24	16	(India) Rishabh Pant	18	6	1.500	2019 Indian Premier League
3	22	16	(South Africa) Quinton de Kock	18	4	1.375	2020 Indian Premier League
4	21	15	(England) Alex Davies	16	5	1.400	2022 Vitality Blast
5	20	12	(Pakistan) Mohammad Rizwan	18	2	1.666	2020 Pakistan Super League
5	20	15	(India) Jitesh Sharma	19	1	1.333	2025 Indian Premier League
5	20	16	(England) Lewis McManus	20	0	1.250	2025 T20 Blast
Last updated: 1 June 2026

=== Most dismissals in year as wicket keeper ===
Rank	Dismissals	Innings	Player	Catches	Stumpings	Diss/Inn	Year
1	53	47	(England) Jos Buttler†	43	10	1.127	2026
2	52	54	(South Africa) Quinton de Kock	48	4	0.962	2022
3	51	52	(Cricket West Indies) Nicholas Pooran	42	9	0.980	2024
4	47	45	(Pakistan) Mohammad Rizwan	41	6	1.044	2021
5	41	42	(South Africa) Quinton de Kock	33	8	0.976	2026
5	41	49	(South Africa) Quinton de Kock	40	1	0.836	2025
Last updated: 19 September 2026

== Individual records (fielding) ==
=== Most catches in career by fielder ===
Rank	Catches	Player	Matches	Innings	Ct/Inn	Period
1	414	(Cricket West Indies) Kieron Pollard†	753	741	0.558	2006–2026
2	346	(South Africa) David Miller†	579	573	0.603	2008–2026
3	280	(Australia) Glenn Maxwell†	524	521	0.537	2010–2026
4	276	(England) James Vince†	498	490	0.563	2010–2026
5	275	(Cricket West Indies) Dwayne Bravo	582	573	0.479	2006–2024
Last updated: 10 September 2026 Note:The list excludes catches made as wicket-keeper

=== Most catches in series as fielder ===
Rank	Catches	Player	Matches	Innings	Series
1	22	(England) Craig Overton	14	14	2023 T20 Blast
2	19	(South Africa) AB de Villiers	16	16	2016 Indian Premier League
3	18	(Australia) Jordan Silk	16	16	2022–23 Big Bash League
4	17	(Bangladesh) Imrul Kayes	11	11	2021-22 Bangladesh Premier League
4	17	(England) Calvin Harrison	14	14	2025 T20 Blast
4	17	(England) Craig Overton	15	15	2025 T20 Blast
4	17	(India) Ruturaj Gaikwad	16	16	2023 Indian Premier League
4	17	(England) David Willey	16	16	2025 T20 Blast
4	17	(India) Riyan Parag	17	17	2022 Indian Premier League
Last updated: 20 December 2025

=== Most catches in year by fielder ===
Rank	Catches	Player	Matches	Innings	Ct/Inn	Year
1	55	(Australia) Tim David	73	72	0.763	2022
2	46	(Cricket West Indies) Shimron Hetmyer	65	65	0.707	2025
3	43	(Australia) Glenn Maxwell	39	38	1.131	2025
4	42	(England) James Vince	57	57	0.736	2025
5	41	(United Arab Emirates) Muhammad Waseem	45	45	0.911	2024
5	41	(Cricket West Indies) Rovman Powell	73	71	0.577	2024
Last updated: 29 December 2025 Note:The list excludes catches made as wicket-keeper

== Individual records (other) ==
=== Most matches played ===
Rank	Matches	Player	Runs	Wickets	Period
1	754	(Cricket West Indies) Kieron Pollard†	14,999	341	2006–2026
2	617	(Cricket West Indies) Sunil Narine†	5,000	658	2011–2026
3	608	(Cricket West Indies) Andre Russell†	9,929	536	2010–2026
4	583	(South Africa) David Miller†	12,397	0	2008–2026
5	582	(Cricket West Indies) Dwayne Bravo	6,970	631	2006–2024
Last updated: 15 September 2026

=== Most matches as captain ===
Rank	Matches	Player	Won	Lost	Tied	NR	Win %	Period
1	331	(India) MS Dhoni	192	133	2	4	59.02	2007–2025
2	251	(England) James Vince†	122	117	5	7	51.02	2014–2026
3	235	(South Africa) Faf du Plessis†	119	103	2	11	53.57	2012–2026
4	225	(India) Rohit Sharma	140	80	5	0	63.33	2013–2024
5	212	(Cricket West Indies) Kieron Pollard†	100	99	2	11	50.24	2013–2026
Last updated: 19 September 2026

=== Most matches won as captain ===
Rank	Won	Player	Matches	Lost	Tied	NR	Win %	Period
1	192	(India) MS Dhoni	331	133	2	4	59.02	2007–2025
2	140	(India) Rohit Sharma	225	80	5	0	63.33	2013–2024
3	113	(England) James Vince†	236	111	5	7	50.43	2014–2026
4	110	(South Africa) Faf du Plessis†	216	94	2	10	53.88	2012–2026
5	104	(Cricket West Indies) Daren Sammy	208	97	2	5	51.72	2006–2020
Last updated: 14 February 2026

=== Most runs as a captain ===
Rank	Runs	Innings	Player	Average	100	50	Period
1	7,227	241	(England) James Vince†	33.45	5	54	2014–2026
2	7,038	216	(South Africa) Faf du Plessis†	36.09	9	47	2012–2026
3	6,564	188	(India) Virat Kohli	43.19	5	50	2011–2023
4	6,283	289	(India) MS Dhoni	37.39	0	23	2007–2025
5	6,064	224	(India) Rohit Sharma	30.01	3	39	2013–2024
Source: ESPNcricinfo.com, last updated: 12 July 2026

=== Most wickets as a captain ===
Rank	Wickets	Player	Matches	Innings	Average	Strike rate	Period
1	190	(Bangladesh) Shakib Al Hasan	145	145	18.36	16.6	2009–2023
2	148	(Afghanistan) Rashid Khan†	110	108	17.87	16.7	2017–2026
3	127	(Bangladesh) Mashrafe Mortaza	145	138	27.44	22.8	2010–2024
4	123	(Pakistan) Shadab Khan†	108	102	22.73	17.6	2019–2026
5	122	(Cricket West Indies) Dwayne Bravo	99	93	22.92	15.7	2007–2022
Last updated: 2 August 2026

=== Most Player of the Match Awards ===
Rank	Number of Awards	Player	Matches	Period
1	60	(Cricket West Indies) Chris Gayle	463	2005–2022
2	51	(Australia) Glenn Maxwell†	530	2010–2026
3	49	(Cricket West Indies) Kieron Pollard†	754	2006–2026
4	48	(Afghanistan) Rashid Khan†	550	2015–2026
5	46	(Bangladesh) Shakib Al Hasan†	483	2009–2026
5	46	(Cricket West Indies) Sunil Narine†	617	2011–2026
Last updated: 21 September 2026

=== Most Player of the Series Awards ===
Rank	Number of Awards	Player	Matches	Period
1	8	(Bangladesh) Shakib Al Hasan†	470	2006–2026
2	7	(Sri Lanka) Wanindu Hasaranga†	243	2017–2026
2	7	(India) Virat Kohli†	414	2007–2025
4	6	(England) Sam Curran†	324	2015–2026
4	6	(India) Suryakumar Yadav†	353	2010–2025
4	6	(South Africa) Quinton de Kock†	433	2011–2026
Last updated: 13 February 2026

== Partnership records ==
=== Record wicket partnerships ===
Partnership	Runs	Batsmen		Team	Opponent	Venue	Date
1st wicket	258*	Lachlan Yamamoto-Lake	Kendel Kadowaki-Fleming	Japan	China	Mission Road Ground, Mong Kok, Hong Kong	15 February 2024
2nd wicket	233	Jos Buttler	Harry Brook	England	India	Rose Bowl, Southampton, England	11 July 2026
3rd wicket	241	Steve Smith	Andries Gous	Washington Freedom	MI New York	Oakland Coliseum, Oakland, United States of America	15 July 2026
4th wicket	208*	Girin Gune	Manpreet Singh	Singapore	Indonesia	Singapore National Cricket Ground, Singapore	25 June 2026
5th wicket	192*	Shakib Al Hasan	Iftikhar Ahmed	Fortune Barishal	Rangpur Riders	Zahur Ahmed Chowdhury Stadium, Chattogram, Bangladesh	19 January 2023
6th wicket	161	Kennar Lewis	Andre Russell	Jamaica Tallawahs	Trinbago Knight Riders	Queen's Park Oval, Port of Spain, Trinidad and Tobago	10 August 2018
7th wicket	112*	Thisara Perera	Chaturanga de Silva	Dhaka Capitals	Khulna Tigers	Sher-e-Bangla National Cricket Stadium, Dhaka, Bangladesh	3 January 2025
8th wicket	134	Marques Ackerman	Eathan Bosch	Dolphins	North West	Absa Puk Oval, Potchefstroom, South Africa	7 April 2024
9th wicket	132*	Saber Zakhil	Saqlain Ali	Belgium	Austria	Royal Brussels Cricket Club, Waterloo, Belgium	24 July 2021
10th wicket	63	Grant Elliott	Zulfiqar Babar	Quetta Gladiators	Peshawar Zalmi	Sharjah Cricket Stadium, Sharjah, United Arab Emirates	14 February 2016
Source: Cricinfo.com, Last updated: 21 July 2026

- Note: An asterisk (*) signifies an unbroken partnership (i.e. neither of the batsmen were dismissed before either the end of the allotted overs or when they reached their required score).

=== Highest partnerships (any wicket) ===
Rank	Wicket	Runs	Players	Batting team	Opposition	Venue	Date
1	1st wicket	258*	Lachlan Yamamoto-Lake & Kendel Kadowaki-Fleming	Japan	China	Mission Road Ground, Mong Kok, Hong Kong	15 February 2024
2	1st wicket	241	Litton Das & Tanzid Hasan	Dhaka Capitals	Durbar Rajshahi	Sylhet International Cricket Stadium, Sylhet, Bangladesh	12 January 2025
2	3rd wicket	241	Steve Smith & Andries Gous	Washington Freedom	MI New York	Oakland Coliseum, Oakland, United States of America	15 July 2026
4	1st wicket	238	Ben Kohler-Cadmore & Musaddiq Ahmed	Germany	Austria	Bayer Uerdingen Cricket Ground, Krefeld, Germany	1 May 2026
5	1st wicket	236	Hazratullah Zazai & Usman Ghani	Afghanistan	Ireland	Rajiv Gandhi International Cricket Stadium, Dehradun, India	23 February 2019
An asterisk (*) signifies an unbroken partnership (i.e. neither of the batsmen was dismissed before either the end of the allotted overs or the required score being reached). Last updated: 21 July 2026

=== Highest overall partnership runs by a pair ===
Rank	Runs	Innings	Players	Highest	Average	100	50	Span
1	3,373	75	Babar Azam & Mohammad Rizwan †	203*	46.20	10	15	2018–2024
2	3,175	77	AB de Villiers & Virat Kohli	229	44.09	10	12	2011–2020
3	3,035	63	Chris Gayle & Virat Kohli	204*	53.24	10	13	2011–2017
4	2,966	49	Sai Sudharsan & Shubman Gill †	210	63.1	11	11	2021–2026
5	2,834	78	Daniel Bell-Drummond & Joe Denly †	207	36.33	5	15	2011–2026
An asterisk (*) signifies an unbroken partnership (i.e. neither of the batsmen was dismissed before either the end of the allotted overs or the required score being reached). Last updated: 1 June 2026

== Individual Records (Officials) ==
=== Most matches as an umpire ===
Rank	Matches	Umpire	Country	Span
1	270	Richard Illingworth	England	2005–2026
2	258	Ahsan Raza	Pakistan	2006–2026
3	254	David Millns	England	2009–2025
4	241	Anil Chaudhary	India	2007–2024
5	231	Rob Bailey	England	2005–2025
5	231	Michael Gough	England	2009–2025
Updated: 14 February 2026

== See also ==
- Twenty20
