= List of Cyprus Twenty20 International cricketers =

This is a list of Cypriot Twenty20 International cricketers.

In April 2018, the ICC decided to grant full Twenty20 International (T20I) status to all its members. Therefore, all Twenty20 matches played between Cyprus and other ICC members after 1 January 2021 will be eligible for T20I status. Cyprus played their first T20Is in a bilateral series against the Estonia on 5 October 2021, followed by the 2021 Cyprus T20I Cup featuring Estonia and Isle of Man.

This list comprises all members of the Cyprus cricket team who have played at least one T20I match. It is initially arranged in the order in which each player won his first Twenty20 cap. Where more than one player will win his first Twenty20 cap in the same match, those players are listed alphabetically by surname (according to the name format used by Cricinfo).

== Key ==
General

- ‡ – Captain
- † – Wicket-keeper
- First – Year of debut
- Last – Year of latest game
- Mat – Number of matches played

Batting

- Runs – Runs scored in career
- HS – Highest score
- Avg – Runs scored per dismissal
- * – Batsman remained not out
- 50 – Half-centuries scored

Bowling

- Balls – Balls bowled in career
- Wkt – Wickets taken in career
- BBI – Best bowling in an innings
- Ave – Average runs per wicket

Fielding

- Ca – Catches taken
- St – Stumpings affected

== List of players ==
Statistics are correct as of 22 May 2026.

Cyprus T20I cricketers
General					Batting				Bowling				Fielding		Ref
No.	Name	First	Last	Mat	Runs	HS	Avg	50	Balls	Wkt	BBI	Ave	Ca	St	Ref
1	Chamal Sadun	2021	2025	21	315	52*	19.68	1	279	10	4/1	31.20	9	0	
2	Gurpratap Singh‡	2021	2022	11	212	54	19.27	1	222	16	4/35	15.37	6	0	
3	BLCS Kumara	2021	2021	2	3	3	1.50	0	–	–	–	–	1	0	
4	Michalis Kyriacou‡	2021	2021	6	60	44*	20.00	0	21	0	–	–	2	0	
5	Roman Mazumder	2021	2026	38	858	80*	27.67	5	12	0	–	–	9	0	
6	Sachithra Pathirana†	2021	2026	20	54	16*	7.72	0	–	–	–	–	6	2	
7	Qasim Anwar	2021	2021	4	7	6	5.50	0	78	5	3/15	14.80	0	0	
8	Tejwinder Singh	2021	2022	11	97	22	12.12	0	227	14	3/11	16.35	3	0	
9	Neeraj Tiwari	2021	2024	17	194	46	14.92	0	317	18	3/14	19.83	6	0	
10	Waqar Ali	2021	2026	18	4	2*	4.00	0	407	37	4/13	9.51	2	0	
11	Yasir Mehmood	2021	2021	4	55	31*	–	0	72	4	3/32	20.75	2	0	
12	Iftekar Jaman	2021	2022	5	50	22	16.66	0	6	0	–	–	3	0	
13	Scott Austin	2021	2025	29	375	46	16.30	0	78	7	3/19	11.57	27	0	
14	Zeeshan Sarwar†	2021	2021	4	116	61	29.00	1	–	–	–	–	0	0	
15	Rajwinder Brar	2021	2024	5	3	2*	1.50	0	24	0	–	–	0	0	
16	Murtaza Yamin	2021	2021	1	0	0*	–	0	18	0	–	–	1	0	
17	Ruwan Arachchilage	2022	2022	4	6	6	6.00	0	30	0	–	–	1	0	
18	Akila Kalugala	2022	2026	18	281	49	15.61	0	48	2	1/10	28.00	7	0	
19	Riyaz Kajalwala	2022	2022	2	1	1	1.00	0	3	0	–	–	0	0	
20	Shoaib Ahmed	2022	2022	5	90	30	18.00	0	108	6	2/8	17.83	2	0	
21	Muhammad Farooq	2022	2022	1	5	5	5.00	0	6	1	1/2	2.00	0	0	
22	Syed Hussain	2022	2022	1	–	–	–	–	–	–	–	–	0	0	
23	Scott Burdekin‡	2024	2025	14	191	59	14.69	1	166	15	4/22	14.06	1	0	
24	James Chialoufas	2024	2024	10	147	37	16.33	0	24	1	1/16	28.00	4	0	
25	Mangala Gunasekara	2024	2026	30	621	70	23.00	4	316	15	3/20	26.60	8	0	
26	Buddika Mahesh	2024	2024	6	16	8	5.33	0	84	3	1/21	37.33	0	0	
27	Arjun Shahi	2024	2026	24	222	44	13.87	0	411	27	3/20	20.22	14	0	
28	Roshan Siriwardena	2024	2026	18	55	18*	11.00	0	171	18	4/27	15.27	4	0	
29	Taranjit Singh	2024	2026	25	301	55	17.70	1	417	26	4/15	19.11	10	0	
30	Kamal Raiz	2024	2025	3	5	5	5.00	0	60	4	2/13	11.25	2	0	
31	Preetaj Deol	2024	2024	3	17	8	5.66	0	24	0	–	–	1	0	
32	Vimal Khanduri	2024	2024	4	9	6	4.50	0	72	5	2/19	19.80	1	0	
33	Adam Senn	2025	2026	20	324	66*	24.92	2	408	22	4/18	20.04	12	0	
34	Hardeep Singh	2025	2025	4	4	4*	–	0	77	2	1/25	58.00	2	0	
35	Lovedeep Singh	2025	2026	11	4	2*	1.33	0	198	10	2/15	24.20	2	0	
36	Alexander Senn	2025	2026	20	422	61*	23.44	2	24	2	2/15	7.50	13	0	
37	Sachithra Tharanga†	2025	2026	11	37	14	9.25	0	–	–	–	–	5	0	
38	Aminul Islam	2025	2025	4	7	7*	–	0	18	2	2/14	7.00	0	0	
39	Ashish Bam	2025	2026	10	40	26*	13.33	0	–	–	–	–	8	0	
40	Karan Singh	2026	2026	10	41	13	5.85	0	180	5	2/26	43.80	6	0	
41	Aaron Frame	2026	2026	1	1	1	1.00	0	21	0	–	–	0	0	
42	Ruel Brathwaite	2026	2026	8	36	11	6.00	0	77	3	2/32	43.00	4	0	
43	Subbareddy Alavala	2026	2026	2	0	0*	0.00	0	24	2	2/34	17.00	0	0	
