= List of Estonia Twenty20 International cricketers =

This is a list of Estonian Twenty20 International cricketers.

In April 2018, the ICC decided to grant full Twenty20 International (T20I) status to all its members. Therefore, all Twenty20 matches played between Estonia and other ICC members after 1 January 2019 will be eligible for T20I status. Estonia played their first T20Is in a bilateral series against the Cyprus on 5 October 2021, followed by the 2021 Cyprus T20I Cup featuring Cyprus and Isle of Man.

This list comprises all members of the Estonia cricket team who have played at least one T20I match. It is initially arranged in the order in which each player won his first Twenty20 cap. Where more than one player won his first Twenty20 cap in the same match, those players are listed alphabetically by surname.

== Key ==
General

- ‡ – Captain
- † – Wicket-keeper
- First – Year of debut
- Last – Year of latest game
- Mat – Number of matches played

Batting

- Runs – Runs scored in career
- HS – Highest score
- Avg – Runs scored per dismissal
- * – Batsman remained not out
- 50 – Number of half centuries
- 100 – Centuries scored

Bowling

- Balls – Balls bowled in career
- Wkt – Wickets taken in career
- BBI – Best bowling in an innings
- Ave – Average runs per wicket

Fielding

- Ca – Catches taken
- St – Stumpings affected

== List of players ==
Statistics are correct as of 14 July 2026.

Estonia T20I cricketers
General					Batting					Bowling				Fielding		Ref
No.	Name	First	Last	Mat	Runs	HS	Avg	50	100	Balls	Wkt	BBI	Ave	Ca	St	Ref
1	Ali Masood	2021	2025	26	446	69*	17.84	2	0	288	23	3/19	17.04	9	0	
2	Ashish Rana	2021	2022	5	13	8*	13.00	0	0	54	4	3/14	17.25	0	0	
3	Tim Cross	2021	2021	2	5	5	3.00	0	0	30	1	1/35	44.00	0	0	
4	Timothy Filer	2021	2021	5	50	38	10.00	0	0	38	4	3/18	10.25	0	0	
5	Habib Khan	2021	2026	31	746	90	25.72	5	0	662	45	4/16	17.84	15	0	
6	Stuart Hook†	2021	2025	33	418	69*	19.00	2	0	–	–	–	–	14	1	
7	Maidul Islam	2021	2022	12	173	49	14.41	0	0	–	–	–	–	1	0	
8	Murali Obili	2021	2022	12	47	18	11.40	0	0	234	7	2/24	40.28	4	0	
9	Moshiur Rahman	2021	2022	4	11	5	11.00	0	0	4	0	–	–	1	0	
10	Marko Vaik‡†	2021	2025	22	90	23*	9.00	0	0	–	–	–	–	15	2	
11	Kalle Vislapuu	2021	2026	22	17	12*	3.40	0	0	347	15	3/29	33.00	4	0	
12	Ali Raza	2021	2022	5	23	17*	11.50	0	0	–	–	–	–	1	0	
13	Ashraful Shuvo	2021	2026	8	9	5	4.50	0	0	156	8	4/33	20.75	0	0	
14	Ayush Ummat	2021	2021	1	0	0	0.00	0	0	–	–	–	–	0	0	
15	Saqib Naveed	2021	2022	4	7	4*	7.00	0	0	54	1	1/40	125.00	0	0	
16	Malcolm Sedgwick	2021	2021	3	–	–	–	0	–	6	0	–	–	0	0	
17	Arslan Amjad‡	2022	2026	33	515	64	16.61	3	0	152	14	3/26	20.21	27	0	
18	Vimal Dwivedi	2022	2022	2	12	7	12.00	0	0	30	1	1/28	35.00	1	0	
19	Elias Hasan	2022	2025	11	51	11	8.50	0	0	156	4	1/24	62.50	1	0	
20	Md Shoyaib	2022	2022	2	17	17	17.00	0	0	6	0	–	–	0	0	
21	Aditya Paul	2022	2026	21	31	14*	6.20	0	0	250	16	3/25	22.43	14	0	
22	Ramesh Tanna	2022	2022	1	2	2*	–	0	0	–	–	–	–	0	0	
23	Aditya Panwar	2023	2026	10	125	62	25.00	1	0	83	6	3/3	20.33	2	0	
24	Ben Jones	2023	2023	1	40	40	40.00	0	0	–	–	–	–	0	0	
25	Bilal Masud	2023	2026	24	519	82	28.83	2	0	187	9	2/18	28.11	10	0	
26	Pranay Gheewala	2023	2025	15	16	7*	4.00	0	0	252	14	3/22	25.07	2	0	
27	Dave Robson	2023	2024	13	29	19*	7.25	0	0	311	13	2/18	24.15	2	0	
28	Sahil Chauhan	2023	2026	27	526	144*	25.04	1	1	77	8	4/19	11.87	8	0	
29	Ram Krishnan	2023	2023	1	–	–	–	–	–	6	0	–	–	0	0	
30	Steffan Gooch	2024	2026	20	556	72*	32.70	5	0	318	24	3/20	16.29	8	0	
31	Richard Parkin	2024	2024	4	4	4	2.00	0	0	66	2	2/10	46.00	0	0	
32	Rudesh Sekaran†	2024	2026	10	16	9*	16.00	0	0	–	–	–	–	5	4	
33	Shayan Khan	2024	2024	1	–	–	–	–	–	12	1	1/17	17.00	0	0	
34	Rupam Baruah	2025	2025	7	76	48	19.00	0	0	60	4	3/13	22.25	1	0	
35	Zeeshan Ali	2025	2026	11	130	27	14.44	0	0	198	14	3/20	17.71	4	0	
36	Muhammad Usman	2025	2025	5	45	43	11.25	0	0	107	3	2/22	40.00	0	0	
37	Vimukthi Hettiarachchi	2025	2025	1	1	1	1.00	0	0	6	0	–	–	0	0	
38	Harri Aggarwal	2026	2026	5	37	21	12.33	0	0	84	4	2/12	26.00	2	0	
39	Rohan Aggarwal	2026	2026	1	0	0	0.00	0	0	24	0	–	–	2	0	
40	Henri Pattenden	2026	2026	4	30	21*	–	0	0	48	0	–	–	2	0	
