= Sahil Chauhan =

Estonian cricketer

Personal information
- Born: 19 February 1992 (age 34); Pinjore , Haryana, India
- Batting: Right-handed
- Bowling: Right-arm medium

International information
- National side: Estonia (2023-present)
- T20I debut (cap 28): 30 September 2023 v Gibraltar
- Last T20I: 3 August 2025 v Switzerland

Career statistics
Competition	T20I	T20
Matches	22	22
Runs scored	479	479
Batting average	29.93	29.93
100s/50s	1/1	1/1
Top score	144*	144*
Balls bowled	72	72
Wickets	6	6
Bowling average	14.00	14.00
5 wickets in innings	0	0
10 wickets in match	0	0
Best bowling	4/19	4/19
Catches/stumpings	7/–	7/–
- Source: Cricinfo, 7 September 2025

Sahil Chauhan is an Estonian cricketer. He currently holds the record of fastest century in Twenty20 International.

== Personal life ==
Sahil completed his schooling from DAV Senior Public School, Surajpur. then, he did his graduation from Panjab University, and later, he completed his postgraduation from a private university, in Mohali.

He currently works as a manager in a chain of restaurants, in Estonia.

== Career ==
=== International career ===
Sahil made his international debut against Gibraltar in September, 2023. After early failures, he scored a blistering knock of unbeaten 144 runs off 41 balls against Cyprus, when his team was struggling to chase a mammoth total of 192. Through his marathon innings, he broke multiple records. He registered the century in 27 balls, which is the fastest century in T20 cricket, broke the record of fastest century in T20Is and T20 cricket which previously held by Jan Nicol Loftie-Eaton and Chris Gayle respectively. His 18 sixes in this innings is the highest for any batter in T20Is and joint-highest in T20 cricket.

=== Domestic career ===
Sahil represents Tallinn United in ECS Estonia T10 league tournament. He has hit a consecutive six sixes in an over, in the same T10 league competition.
