= Strike rate =

Statistics in cricket

Strike rate refers to two different statistics in the sport of cricket. Batting strike rate is a measure of how quickly a batter achieves the primary goal of batting, namely scoring runs, measured in runs per 100 balls; higher is better. Bowling strike rate is a measure of how quickly a bowler achieves the primary goal of bowling, namely taking wickets (i.e. getting batters out), measured in balls per wicket; lower is better. For bowlers, economy rate is a more frequently discussed statistic in limited overs cricket and bowling average in Tests.

Both strike rates are relatively new statistics, having only been invented and considered of importance after the introduction of One Day International cricket in the 1970s.

== Batting strike rate ==
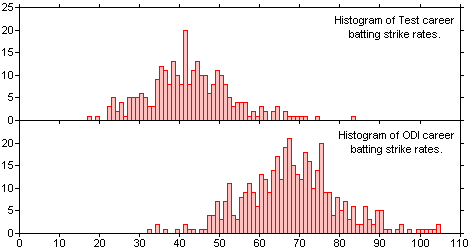
International batting strike rates as of January 2004

Batting strike rate (s/r) is defined for a batter as the average number of runs scored per 100 balls faced. The higher the strike rate, the more effective a batter is at scoring quickly.

In Test cricket, a batter's strike rate is of secondary importance to ability to score runs without getting out. This means a Test batter's most important statistic is generally considered to be batting average, rather than strike rate.

In limited overs cricket, strike rates are of considerably more importance. Since each team only faces a limited number of balls in an innings, the faster a batter scores, the more runs the team will be able to accumulate. Strike rates of over 150 are becoming common in Twenty20 cricket. Strike rate is probably considered by most as the key factor in a batter in one day cricket. Accordingly, the batters with higher strike rates, especially in Twenty20 matches, are more valued than those with a lesser strike rate. Strike rate is also used to compare a batter’s ability to score runs against differing forms of bowling (eg spin bowling, fast bowling), often giving an indication to the bowling team as to how successfully to limit a batter's ability to score.

=== Highest career strike rate (T20I) ===
Strike rate	Batter	Team	Runs scored	Balls faced	Span
196.36	Abhishek Sharma †	India	2,268	1,155	2024–2026
183.39	Mehboob Ali †	Malta	519	283	2025–2026
176.78	Olipa Gerald †	Uganda	495	280	2026–2026
175.91	Sahil Chauhan †	Estonia	526	299	2023–2026
174.32	Mohammad Ihsan †	Spain	903	518	2022–2026
Qualification: 250 balls. Updated: 1 November 2026

=== Highest career strike rate (ODI) ===
Men's One Day Internationals:

Rank	Strike rate	Player	Team	Runs	Balls faced	Period
1	130.22	Andre Russell	West Indies	1,034	794	2011–2019
2	126.70	Glenn Maxwell	Australia	3,990	3,149	2012–2025
3	117.06	Lionel Cann	Bermuda	590	504	2006–2009
4	117.05	Heinrich Klaasen	South Africa	2,141	1,829	2018–2025
5	117.00	Shahid Afridi	Pakistan	8,064	6,892	1996–2015
Last updated: 4 March 2025
Qualification: Faced at least 500 balls.

Women's One Day Internationals:

Strike rate	Player	Runs	Balls faced	Period
116.20	(Australia) Georgia Voll	710	611	2024–2026
110.46	(Australia) Ashleigh Gardner	1,699	1,538	2017–2026
107.04	(England) Maia Bouchier	729	681	2023–2026
102.45	(India) Richa Ghosh	1,215	1,188	2021–2026
101.05	(South Africa) Chloe Tryon	2,431	2,403	2011–2026
Qualification: 500 balls faced. Last updated: 25 October 2026

== Bowling strike rate ==
Bowling strike rate is defined for a bowler as the average number of balls bowled per wicket taken. The lower the strike rate, the more effective a bowler is at taking wickets quickly.

Although introduced as a statistic complementary to the batting strike rate during the ascension of one-day cricket in the 1980s, bowling strike rates are arguably of more importance in Test cricket than One-day Internationals. This is because the primary goal of a bowler in Test cricket is to take wickets, whereas in a one-day match it is often sufficient to bowl economically - giving away as few runs as possible even if this means taking fewer wickets.

=== Best career strike rate (Tests) ===
Retired players (Men)
Strike rate	Player	Country	Balls	Wickets
34.19	George Lohmann	England	3830	112
37.73	J. J. Ferris	Australia / England	2302	61
38.75	Shane Bond	New Zealand	3372	87
41.65	Sydney Barnes	England	7873	189
42.38	Dale Steyn	South Africa	18608	439
Qualification: 2,000 balls Last updated: 27 July 2023

Retired players (Women)
Strike rate	Player	Country	Balls	Wickets
38.72	Julia Greenwood	England	1,123	29
42.42	Betty Wilson	Australia	2,885	68
48.49	Mary Duggan	England	3,734	77
50.40	Patricia Whittaker	West Indies	1,260	25
51.19	Katherine Sciver-Brunt	England	2,611	51
Qualification: 1,000 balls Last updated: 27 July 2023

Active players (Men)
Strike rate	Player	Country	Balls	Wickets
38.06	Kuldeep Yadav	India	2,893	76
38.29	Marco Jansen	South Africa	3,408	89
38.84	Duanne Olivier	South Africa	2,292	59
38.91	Scott Boland	Australia	3,191	82
39.10	Gus Atkinson	England	2,698	69
Qualification: 2,000 balls

Active players (Women)
Strike rate	Player	Country	Balls	Wickets
46.50	Ashleigh Gardner	Australia	1,302	28
52.84	Ellyse Perry	Australia	2,061	39
58.56	Kate Cross	England	1,464	25
62.72	Sophie Ecclestone	England	2,509	40
Qualification: 1000 balls Last updated: 31 December 2025
