= Cyprus Cricket Association =

Governing body of cricket in Cyprus

- Sport: Cricket
- Abbreviation: CCA
- Affiliation: International Cricket Council
- Regional affiliation: ICC Europe
- Location: Limassol, Cyprus
- Chairman: Muhammad Husain
- Secretary: Richard Boxall

Official website
- www.cypruscricket.com
- (Cyprus)

The Cyprus Cricket Association (CCA) (Greek: Σύνδεσμος Κρίκετ Κύπρου) (Turkish: Kıbrıs Kriket Federasyonu) is the governing body of cricket in Cyprus. It is a member of the ICC Europe (earlier the European Cricket Council) and an associate member of the International Cricket Council since 1999. It organises the Cyprus cricket league which has 23 participating teams including some from the British military bases of Akrotiri, Episkopi, and Dekhelia. It is also responsible for the Cyprus National Cricket team.

Cricket has been played in Cyprus for many years, but has mainly been confined to the British Army bases. Moufflons Cricket Club was the first ever Cyprus based cricket club established in 1987.

The European Cricket Council, given the task of promoting cricket throughout Europe, encouraged Cyprus Cricket to form its own organisation, the Cyprus Cricket Association, with its own committee and constitution.

From 2003 the CCA have been organising cricket on the island, extending the game into the towns, setting up a league, starting youth cricket in the schools, and forming a national team to enter European competitions. The European Cricket Council provides the CCA with funds to promote youth cricket and train coaches to go out into the schools.

The British Army has been helpful to the CCA, giving them access to its facilities, and entering teams into the newly formed league. In fact the 2005 league champions were a military side, WSBA.

== See also ==
- Cyprus national cricket team
- Cyprus women's national cricket team
