= Estonian Cricket Association =

Sports governing body in Estonia

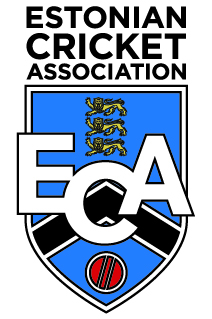

Estonia Cricket Association is the official governing body of the sport of cricket in Estonia. Its current headquarters is in Tallinn, Estonia. Estonia Cricket Association is Estonia's representative at the International Cricket Council and is an associate member and has been a member of that body since 2008. It is also a member of the ICC Europe (earlier the European Cricket Council).

== See also ==
- Estonia national cricket team
- Estonia women's national cricket team
- Estonia national under-19 cricket team
- Estonia women's national under-19 cricket team
- Estonian Cricket League
