= Cyprus women's national cricket team =

Cyprus

Personnel
- Captain: Iresha Chathurani

International Cricket Council
- ICC status: Associate member (2017)
- ICC region: Europe
ICC Rankings	Current	Best-ever
T20I	42nd	42nd (2 Aug 2025)

T20 Internationals
- First T20I: v. Estonia at Happy Valley Ground 2, Episkopi; 17 June 2024
- Last T20I: v. Malta at Happy Valley Ground, Episkopi; 20 June 2026
T20Is	Played	Won/Lost
Total	30	21/7 (0 ties, 2 no results)
This year	11	9/1 (0 ties, 1 no result)
- As of 20 June 2026

The Cyprus national women's cricket team is the team that represents Cyprus in international women's cricket. In April 2018, the International Cricket Council (ICC) granted full Women's Twenty20 International (WT20I) status to all its members. Therefore, all Twenty20 matches that will be played between Czech Republic women and other ICC members after 1 July 2018 have been eligible for full WT20I status. Cyprus played their first ever WT20I on 17 June 2024 against Estonia.

== Records and statistics ==
International Match Summary — Cyprus Women

Last updated 20 June 2026

Playing Record
Format	M	W	L	T	NR	Inaugural Match
Twenty20 Internationals	30	21	7	0	2	17 June 2024

=== Twenty20 International ===
- Highest team total: 201/0 v Czech Republic on 2 May 2025 at Vinoř Cricket Ground, Prague.
- Highest individual score: 68*, Iresha Chathurani v Estonia on 19 June 2024 at Happy Valley Ground, Episkopi.
- Best individual bowling figures: 4/20, Samanthi Dunukedeniya v Denmark on 20 April 2025 at Happy Valley Ground, Episkopi.

T20I record versus other nations

Records complete to WT20I #2876. Last updated 20 June 2026.

Opponent	M	W	L	T	NR	First match	First win
ICC Associate members
Czech Republic	5	5	0	0	0	2 May 2025	2 May 2025
Denmark	2	0	2	0	0	19 April 2025	
Estonia	6	5	0	0	1	17 June 2024	17 June 2024
Greece	6	4	1	0	1	3 April 2026	3 April 2026
Isle of Man	2	0	2	0	0	18 April 2025	
Jersey	2	0	2	0	0	18 April 2025	
Malta	5	5	0	0	0	18 June 2026	18 June 2026
Serbia	2	2	0	0	0	14 September 2024	14 September 2024

== See also ==
- List of Cyprus women Twenty20 International cricketers
