= Estonian Cricket League =

Organization based in Estonia

The Estonian Cricket League was formed in 2007 and takes place in Tallinn, Estonia.

The league consisted of four teams in one division. The four teams are as follows:

- Kalev Cricket Club' Captain: Andres Burget.
- Rocca Al Mare Rocks Cricket Club Captain: Andrew Meek.
- Tallinn Hippos Cricket Club Captain: Rob Brookes.
- Pikk Hermann Cricket Club Captain: Shivalingam Arunachalam.

The four teams are all based in Tallinn and played each other in a round robin format over the course of the Estonian cricket season.

Between 2013 and 2021 the Estonian domestic cricket league expanded to 12 teams competing across 2 competitions, T20 and 40 overs.

In 2021 the 12 teams competing are:

- Tallinn Hippos
- Tallinn United
- Tallinn Strikers
- Tallinn Stallions
- Eesti Tigers
- Viking Stars
- Tartu KK
- Tartu Wolves
- Tallinn Riders
- Tallinn United Falcons
- eFP Eagles
- Tallinn Rising Stars

Players from the Estonian Cricket League are picked to play international cricket for the Estonia national cricket team. Players must be attached to a club team before they are eligible for selection to the national side. Being such a young cricket playing country, most of the players qualify for national selection under the ICC rules. The Estonian Cricket League has many players from many nationalities, but the majority have all lived in Estonia for four years or more.

The formation of an Estonian cricket league was an essential requirement for acceptance to ICC affiliate member status.

== See also ==
- Estonia Cricket Association
