= 2021 Cyprus T20I Cup =

International cricket tournament

Estonian cricket team in Cyprus in 2021–22
	Cyprus	Estonia
- Date: 5 October 2021
Captains	Michalis Kyriacou	Marko Vaik

Twenty20 International series
- Results: Cyprus won the 2-match series 2–0
Most runs	Gurpratap Singh (54)	Habib Khan (62)
Most wickets	Yasir Mehmood (4)	Ali Masood (4)

The 2021 Cyprus T20I Cup was a Twenty20 International (T20I) cricket tournament that took place in Cyprus in October 2021. The participating teams were the hosts Cyprus along with Estonia and Isle of Man. On 5 October, Cyprus and Estonia played a two-match bilateral series, which were the first official T20I matches for both sides, before the tri-nation Cyprus T20I Cup began on 6 October. The venue for the matches was the Happy Valley Ground in Episkopi, within the Cypriot district of Limassol.

Cyprus defeated Estonia 2–0 in their bilateral series, before the Isle of Man won the tri-nation tournament with a 100% record. Individual awards were won by Adam McAuley (Isle of Man, batting), Waqar Ali (Cyprus, bowling), Carl Hartmann (Isle of Man, fielding), Ali Masood (Estonia, most valuable player).

== Squads ==
Cyprus	Estonia	Isle of Man
Michalis Kyriacou (c); Waqar Ali; Qasim Anwar; Scott Austin (wk); Rajwinder Brar; Iftekar Jaman; BLCS Kumara; Roman Mazumder; Yasir Mehmood; Sachithra Pathirana (wk); Chamal Sadun; Zeeshan Sarwar (wk); Gurpratap Singh; Tejwinder Singh; Neeraj Tiwari; Murtaza Yamin	Marko Vaik (c, wk); Tim Cross; Timothy Filer; Stuart Hook (wk); Maidul Islam; Habib Khan; Ali Masood; Saqib Naveed; Murali Obili; Moshiur Rahman; Ashish Rana; Ali Raza; Malcolm Sedgwick; Ashraful Shuvo; Ayush Ummat; Kalle Vislapuu	Matthew Ansell (c); Edward Beard; George Burrows; Joseph Burrows; Jacob Butler; Fraser Clarke; Josh Clough; Carl Hartmann (wk); Dollin Jansen; Nathan Knights; Chris Langford; Adam McAuley; Conor Smith; Alex Stokoe; Edward Walker

Cyprus named Michalis Kyriacou as captain of an initial squad of 22 players, which was reduced to 16 ahead of the matches.

== Bilateral series ==
=== 1st T20I ===
5 October 2021
10:00
Scorecard

Estonia; 102/8 (20 overs)	v	Cyprus; 105/6 (18.1 overs)
Maidul Islam 49 (37); Tejwinder Singh 3/11 (4 overs)		Michalis Kyriacou 44* (47); Habib Khan 3/18 (4 overs)

Cyprus won by 4 wickets
Happy Valley Ground, Episkopi
Umpires: Steve Ross (Eng) and Suleman Saeed (Pak)
Player of the match: Tejwinder Singh (Cyp)

- Cyprus won the toss and elected to field.
- Waqar Ali, Qasim Anwar, BLCS Kumara, Michalis Kyriacou, Roman Mazumder, Yasir Mehmood, Sachithra Pathirana, Chamal Sadun, Gurpratap Singh, Tejwinder Singh, Neeraj Tiwari (Cyp), Tim Cross, Timothy Filer, Stuart Hook, Maidul Islam, Habib Khan, Ali Masood, Murali Obili, Moshiur Rahman, Ashish Rana, Marko Vaik and Kalle Vislapuu (Est) all made their T20I debuts.

=== 2nd T20I ===
5 October 2021
14:00
Scorecard

Estonia; 130/6 (20 overs)	v	Cyprus; 131/2 (14.1 overs)
Habib Khan 60 (53); Yasir Mehmood 3/32 (4 overs)		Gurpratap Singh 54 (25); Ali Masood 2/19 (3 overs)

Cyprus won by 8 wickets
Happy Valley Ground, Episkopi
Umpires: Tim Heath (Est) and Steve Ross (Eng)
Player of the match: Gurpratap Singh (Cyp)

- Estonia won the toss and elected to bat.
- Scott Austin, Iftekar Jaman (Cyp), Saqib Naveed, Ali Raza, Malcolm Sedgwick, Ashraful Shuvo and Ayush Ummat (Est) all made their T20I debuts.

== Tri-nation series ==
2021 Cyprus T20I Cup
- Date: 6–8 October 2021
- Location: Cyprus
- Result: Isle of Man won the tournament
- Player of the series: (Estonia) Ali Masood
Teams
Cyprus	Estonia	Isle of Man
Captains
Michalis Kyriacou	Marko Vaik	Matthew Ansell
Most runs
Zeeshan Sarwar (116)	Maidul Islam (87)	Adam McAuley (119)
Most wickets
Waqar Ali (9)	Ali Masood (7)	Jacob Butler (8)

=== Points table ===
Team	P	W	L	T	NR	Pts	NRR
Isle of Man	4	4	0	0	0	8	+2.541
Cyprus	4	2	2	0	0	4	+0.719
Estonia	4	0	4	0	0	0	−3.228

=== Fixtures ===
6 October 2021
10:00
Scorecard

Cyprus; 92 (19.2 overs)	v	Isle of Man; 93/2 (11.5 overs)
Neeraj Tiwari 33 (37); Joseph Burrows 4/10 (4 overs)		George Burrows 33 (27); Tejwinder Singh 1/21 (2.5 overs)

Isle of Man won by 8 wickets
Happy Valley Ground, Episkopi
Umpires: Tim Heath (Est) and Tom Smith (Eng)
Player of the match: Joseph Burrows (IoM)

- Cyprus won the toss and elected to bat.
- Zeeshan Sarwar (Cyp), Edward Beard, Conor Smith and Alex Stokoe (IoM) all made their T20I debuts.

6 October 2021
14:00
Scorecard

Estonia; 118/7 (20 overs)	v	Isle of Man; 122/4 (15.4 overs)
Maidul Islam 43 (47); Conor Smith 3/15 (4 overs)		Carl Hartmann 34* (28); Ashish Rana 3/14 (3 overs)

Isle of Man won by 6 wickets
Happy Valley Ground, Episkopi
Umpires: Suleman Saeed (Pak) and Tom Smith (Eng)
Player of the match: Conor Smith (IoM)

- Estonia won the toss and elected to bat.
- Dollin Jansen (IoM) made his T20I debut.

7 October 2021
10:00
Scorecard

Cyprus; 149/7 (20 overs)	v	Isle of Man; 151/7 (19.3 overs)
Zeeshan Sarwar 46 (25); Matthew Ansell 2/16 (4 overs)		Adam McAuley 45 (32); Waqar Ali 3/22 (4 overs)

Isle of Man won by 3 wickets
Happy Valley Ground, Episkopi
Umpires: Tim Heath (Est) and Steve Ross (Eng)
Player of the match: Gurpratap Singh (Cyp)

- Isle of Man won the toss and elected to field.

7 October 2021
14:00
Scorecard

Cyprus; 187/8 (20 overs)	v	Estonia; 108 (18.5 overs)
Roman Mazumder 53 (38); Ali Masood 3/19 (4 overs)		Timothy Filer 38 (38); Waqar Ali 4/14 (3.5 overs)

Cyprus won by 79 runs
Happy Valley Ground, Episkopi
Umpires: Steve Ross (Eng) and Suleman Saeed (Pak)
Player of the match: Waqar Ali (Cyp)

- Cyprus won the toss and elected to bat.

8 October 2021
10:00
Scorecard

Cyprus; 160/9 (20 overs)	v	Estonia; 121/6 (20 overs)
Zeeshan Sarwar 61 (39); Timothy Filer 3/18 (4 overs)		Habib Khan 50 (40); Tejwinder Singh 2/16 (4 overs)

Cyprus won by 39 runs
Happy Valley Ground, Episkopi
Umpires: Steve Ross (Eng) and Tom Smith (Eng)
Player of the match: Zeeshan Sarwar (Cyp)

- Cyprus won the toss and elected to bat.
- Rajwinder Brar and Murtaza Yamin (Cyp) both made their T20I debuts.

8 October 2021
14:00
Scorecard

Estonia; 71 (17.1 overs)	v	Isle of Man; 72/2 (8.2 overs)
Stuart Hook 23 (21); Jacob Butler 4/12 (4 overs)		George Burrows 19* (15); Ali Masood 1/25 (3 overs)

Isle of Man won by 8 wickets
Happy Valley Ground, Episkopi
Umpires: Steve Ross (Eng) and Tom Smith (Eng)
Player of the match: Jacob Butler (IoM)

- Isle of Man won the toss and elected to field.
