= 2019 Spain Triangular T20I Series =

- Date: 29–31 March 2019
- Location: Spain
- Result: Spain won the series
Teams
| Estonia XI | Malta | Spain |
Captains
| Tim Heath | Nowell Khosla | Christian Munoz-Mills |
Most runs
| Timothy Filer (55) | Bikram Arora (101) | Awais Ahmed (102) |
Most wickets
| Kalle Vislapuu (4) | Niraj Khanna (4) | Faran Afzal (7) |

The 2019 Spain Triangular T20I Series was a cricket tournament held in Spain from 29 to 31 March 2019. The tournament featured the national teams of Spain and Malta, as well as an Estonia XI. All matches were played at La Manga Club, near the city of Cartagena in the Region of Murcia.

The matches played between Spain and Malta had Twenty20 International (T20I) status, with both teams making their debuts in the format after the International Cricket Council announced that all matches played between Associate Members from 1 January 2019 would have T20I status. The Estonian XI was not an official national side. Spain won the series after all three games on the final day were abandoned with no play possible due to rain.

== Squads ==
| Estonia XI | Malta | Spain |
|---|---|---|
| Tim Heath (c); Travis Beswick; Akash Chandrashekaran; Tim Cross; Timothy Filer; Sachin HM; Stuart Hook; Ashish Rana; Malcolm Sedgwick; Ashraful Shuvo; Mart Tammoja; Marko Vaik; Kalle Vislapuu; Moshiur Rahman | Nowell Khosla (c); George Aguis; Sujesh Appu; Samuel Aquilina; Bikram Arora; Luke Bradley; Jurg Hirschi; Sumair Khan; Niraj Khanna; David Marks; Haroon Mughal; Michael Nazir; Hasheem Shahzad | Christian Munoz-Mills (c); Faran Afzal; Adam Algar; Awais Ahmed; Yasir Ali; Muhammad Asjed; Hamza Dar; Zulqarnain Haider; Paul Hennessy; Tauqeer Hussain; Kuldeep Lal; Vinod Kumar; Atif Mehmood; Ravi Panchal; Mukhtiar Singh; Tom Vine |

== Points table ==
| | P | W | L | T | NR | Pts | NRR |
|---|---|---|---|---|---|---|---|
| Spain | 6 | 4 | 0 | 0 | 2 | 10 | +4.880 |
| Malta | 6 | 2 | 2 | 0 | 2 | 6 | –0.689 |
| Estonia XI | 6 | 0 | 4 | 0 | 2 | 2 | –3.721 |

== Fixtures ==
29 March 2019
09:30
Scorecard

| Malta; 125/6 (20 overs) | v | Estonia XI; 112/9 (20 overs) |
| Niraj Khanna 51 (42); Kalle Vislapuu 2/14 (4 overs) | | Stuart Hook 25 (22); Niraj Khanna 3/8 (2 overs) |

Malta won by 13 runs
La Manga Club, Cartagena
Umpires: Harmit Dhull (Esp) and John Howden (Esp)

- Malta won the toss and elected to bat.

29 March 2019
12:30
Scorecard

| Estonia XI; 86/7 (20 overs) | v | Spain; 88/0 (8.5 overs) |
| Tim Heath 15 (20); Faran Afzal 2/5 (4 overs) | | Faran Afzal 58* (33) |

Spain won by 10 wickets
La Manga Club, Cartagena
Umpires: John Howden (Esp) and Adnan Khan (Esp)

- Spain won the toss and elected to field.

29 March 2019
15:30
Scorecard

| Malta; 98/9 (20 overs) | v | Spain; 99/3 (12.1 overs) |
| Bikram Arora 28 (25); Tom Vine 4/28 (4 overs) | | Yasir Ali 57 (40); Jurg Hirschi 1/15 (2 overs) |

Spain won by 7 wickets
La Manga Club, Cartagena
Umpires: Harmit Dhull (Esp) and Adnan Khan (Esp)

- Malta won the toss and elected to bat.
- Faran Afzal, Awais Ahmed, Yasir Ali, Zulqarnain Haider, Tauqeer Hussain, Kuldeep Lal, Atif Mehmood, Christian Munoz-Mills, Ravi Panchal, Mukhtiar Singh, Tom Vine (Esp), George Aguis, Sujesh Appu, Samuel Aquilina, Bikram Arora, Jurg Hirschi, Sumair Khan, Niraj Khanna, Nowell Khosla, David Marks, Haroon Mughal and Hasheem Shahzad (Mlt) all made their T20I debuts.

30 March 2019
09:30
Scorecard

| Spain; 183/4 (20 overs) | v | Estonia XI; 84/8 (20 overs) |
| Vinod Kumar 40* (27); Travis Beswick 2/39 (4 overs) | | Stuart Hook 17 (24); Christian Munoz-Mills 2/7 (3 overs) |

Spain won by 99 runs
La Manga Club, Cartagena
Umpires: John Howden (Esp) and Adnan Khan (Esp)

- Spain won the toss and elected to bat.

30 March 2019
12:30
Scorecard

| Spain; 206/2 (20 overs) | v | Malta; 97 (19.5 overs) |
| Awais Ahmed 102* (64); Sujesh Appu 1/21 (2 overs) | | Nowell Khosla 27 (23); Faran Afzal 3/11 (4 overs) |

Spain won by 109 runs
La Manga Club, Cartagena
Umpires: Harmit Dhull (Esp) and Adnan Khan (Esp)

- Spain won the toss and elected to bat.
- Muhammad Asjed, Paul Hennessy (Esp) and Michael Nazir (Mlt) all made their T20I debuts.
- Awais Ahmed became the first batsman for Spain to score a century in T20Is.

30 March 2019
15:30
Scorecard

| Malta; 157/4 (20 overs) | v | Estonia XI; 63 (16.4 overs) |
| Bikram Arora 42* (31); Tim Heath 1/18 (4 overs) | | Tim Heath 17 (20); George Aguis 2/6 (3 overs) |

Malta won by 94 runs
La Manga Club, Cartagena
Umpires: Harmit Dhull (Esp) and John Howden (Esp)

- Malta won the toss and elected to bat.

31 March 2019
10:00
Scorecard

| Spain | v | Malta |

Match abandoned
La Manga Club, Cartagena
Umpires: Harmit Dhull (Esp) and Adnan Khan (Esp)

- No toss.
- No play was possible due to rain.

31 March 2019
13:00
Scorecard

| Estonia XI | v | Malta |

Match abandoned
La Manga Club, Cartagena
Umpires: Harmit Dhull (Esp) and John Howden (Esp)

- No toss.
- No play was possible due to rain.

31 March 2019
16:00
Scorecard

| Spain | v | Estonia XI |

Match abandoned
La Manga Club, Cartagena
Umpires: John Howden (Esp) and Adnan Khan (Esp)

- No toss.
- No play was possible due to rain.
