= Happy Valley Ground =

Cricket ground

- Interactive map of Happy Valley Ground

Ground information
- Location: Sotira, Limassol, Cyprus
- Country: Cyprus
- Coordinates: 34°40′20″N 32°49′17.9″E
- Establishment: 2021

International information
- First men's T20I: 5 October 2021: Cyprus v Estonia
- Last men's T20I: 19 June 2024: Cyprus v Estonia
- First women's T20I: 17 June 2024: Cyprus v Estonia
- Last women's T20I: 20 April 2025: Isle of Man v Jersey
- As of 4 November 2025; Source: ESPNcricinfo

Happy Valley Ground 2
- Interactive map of Happy Valley Ground 2

Ground information
- Location: Paramali, Limassol, Cyprus
- Country: Cyprus
- Coordinates: 34°40′15.5″N 32°49′8.1″E
- Establishment: 2024

International information
- First men's T20I: 31 October 2025: Cyprus v Serbia
- Last men's T20I: 16 March 2026: Cyprus v Austria
- First women's T20I: 17 June 2024: Cyprus v Estonia
- Last women's T20I: 5 April 2026: Cyprus v Greece
- As of 19 April 2026; Source: ESPNcricinfo

The Happy Valley Ground is a cricket ground situated in Sotira, near Episkopi in the Limassol District of Cyprus.

In October 2021, the ground was the venue for the 2021 Cyprus T20I Cup which involved the Cyprus national men's team along with Isle of Man and Estonia. Cyprus and Estonia played a two-match bilateral series on 5 October, which was the first official Twenty20 International (T20I) matches for both sides, before the tri-nation Cyprus T20I Cup starting on 6 October.
