= List of Cyprus women Twenty20 International cricketers =

This is a list of Cyprus Twenty20 International cricketers. A Women's Twenty20 International (WT20I) is an international cricket match between two representative teams. A WT20I is played under the rules of Twenty20 cricket. In April 2018, the International Cricket Council (ICC) granted full international status to Twenty20 women's matches played between member sides from 1 July 2018 onwards. Cyprus women played their first WT20I on 17 June 2024 against Estonia during their home series against Estonia.

This list will comprise all members of the Cyprus women's cricket team who have played at least one T20I match. It is initially arranged in the order in which each player won her first Twenty20 cap. Where more than one player will win her first Women's Twenty20 cap in the same match, those players will be listed alphabetically by surname (according to the name format used by Cricinfo).

== Key ==
General

- ‡ – Captain
- † – Wicket-keeper
- First – Year of debut
- Last – Year of latest game
- Mat – Number of matches played

Batting

- Runs – Runs scored in career
- HS – Highest score
- Avg – Runs scored per dismissal
- * – Batsman remained not out
- 50 – Half-centuries scored
- 100 – Centuries scored

Bowling

- Balls – Balls bowled in career
- Wkt – Wickets taken in career
- BBI – Best bowling in an innings
- Ave – Average runs per wicket

Fielding

- Ca – Catches taken
- St – Stumpings affected

== List of players ==
Statistics are correct as of 20 June 2026.

General					Batting				Bowling				Fielding		Ref
No.	Name	First	Last	Mat	Runs	HS	Avg	50	Balls	Wkt	BBI	Ave	Ca	St	Ref
1	Iresha Chathurani‡	2024	2026	30	470	68*	67.14	2	526	29	3/6	12.13	17	0	
2	Thamara De Silva†	2024	2026	30	76	15*	6.90	0	–	–	–	–	19	5	
3	Ayesha Dirannehelage	2024	2026	29	366	65*	17.42	2	445	25	3/5	12.84	4	0	
4	Samanthi Dunukedeniya	2024	2026	30	125	65*	9.61	0	470	44	7/15	8.22	6	0	
5	Thanuja Gedarage	2024	2026	15	106	26	7.57	0	–	–	–	–	0	0	
6	Anusha Hewage	2024	2026	8	1	1	1.00	0	12	1	1/0	10.00	0	0	
7	Sasmi Jayakodi	2024	2026	25	128	17*	8.53	0	–	–	–	–	0	0	
8	Dinelka Koralalage	2024	2026	30	106	20*	7.57	0	548	32	4/9	12.28	6	0	
9	Nilmini Liyanage	2024	2026	24	92	16	7.66	0	168	8	2/3	22.50	2	0	
10	Alexandra Taylor	2024	2026	27	64	15*	8.00	0	269	16	3/6	18.37	8	0	
11	Chandrika Wijesinghe	2024	2026	29	49	14*	7.00	0	354	45	4/23	10.80	1	0	
12	Shyma Arachchige	2024	2026	5	4	4*	–	–	–	–	–	–	0	0	
13	Nadeesha Waruwangodage	2024	2026	6	12	6	6.00	0	–	–	–	–	1	0	
14	Nilusha Waruwangodage	2024	2026	10	13	8*	13.00	0	78	5	2/18	19.80	0	0	
15	Chandani Gamlath	2025	2026	9	0	0*	–	0	–	–	–	–	1	0	
16	Milini Mudiyanselage	2025	2026	3	4	3	2.00	0	6	0	–	–	0	0	
17	Irani Siriwardanalage	2025	2025	1	–	–	–	–	6	0	–	–	0	0	
18	Nadeesha Godage	2025	2025	1	–	–	–	–	–	–	–	–	0	0	
19	Dilini Ishara	2026	2026	11	45	12	4.50	0	6	0	–	–	1	0	
20	Dilini Ishara	2026	2026	7	4	3	1.33	0	12	0	–	–	0	0	
