= Cyprus national cricket team =

Cyprus
- Nickname: The cricket map
- Association: Cyprus Cricket Association

Personnel
- Captain: Nick Stav
- Coach: Ruel Brathwaite

International Cricket Council
- ICC status: Associate member (2017)
- ICC region: Europe
ICC Rankings	Current	Best-ever
T20I	63rd	56th (17-Jul-2021)

International cricket
- First international: v. Slovenia at Antwerp Cricket Club, Antwerp; 26 August 2006

T20 Internationals
- First T20I: v. Estonia at Happy Valley Ground, Episkopi; 5 October 2021
- Last T20I: v. Croatia at Happy Valley Ground, Episkopi; 22 May 2026
T20Is	Played	Won/Lost
Total	42	22/20 (0 ties, 0 no result)
This year	10	2/8 (0 ties, 0 no results)
T20I kit
- As of 22 May 2026

The Cypriot national cricket team represents Cyprus in international cricket. They became an International Cricket Council (ICC) affiliate member in 1999, and an associate member in 2017, although it was not until August 2006 that they made their international debut, finishing as runners up in Division Four of the European Championship.

In April 2018, the ICC decided to grant full Twenty20 International (T20I) status to all its members. Therefore, all Twenty20 matches played between Cyprus and other ICC members after 1 January 2019 have T20I status.

== History ==
In 2007, the Cyprus Cricket National team competed in the European Division 3 Championships where they finished in 7th place out of 8.

In 2009, Cyprus then hosted the ICC Division 4 Championships in Cyprus which turned out to be a great success for the Cyprus National cricket team winning the Division 4 championship.

In 2011, Cyprus then competed in the ICC Division 2 T20 Championships held in Belgium where they came 10th place in the tournament, beating Sweden in the play-off game for 10th/11th place.

Cyprus were ranked 24th in the ICC European Twenty20 Rankings (as of 29 December 2012).

In 2018, the Cyprus National Team; captained by Muhammad Husain took part in ICC T20 World Cup Europe Qualifier which took place in Holland. Cyprus could only win one game against Austria.

In 2021, Cyprus played 2-match bilateral series against Estonia, making their T20I debut and won the series 2–0. On the same tour, Cyprus hosted a tri-series by inviting Isle of Man alongside Estonia. Estonia couldn't secure a single win on that tour while Isle of Man took the title home.

In 2022, National team played in the ICC Men's Europe Qualifier for 2024 T20 World Cup under the captaincy of Gurpratap Singh.

== Tournament history ==
=== European Cricket Championship ===
- 2006: 2nd place (Division Four)
- 2007: 7th place (Division Three)
- 2009: 1st place (Division Four)
- 2011: 10th place (T20) (Division two)

== Squad ==
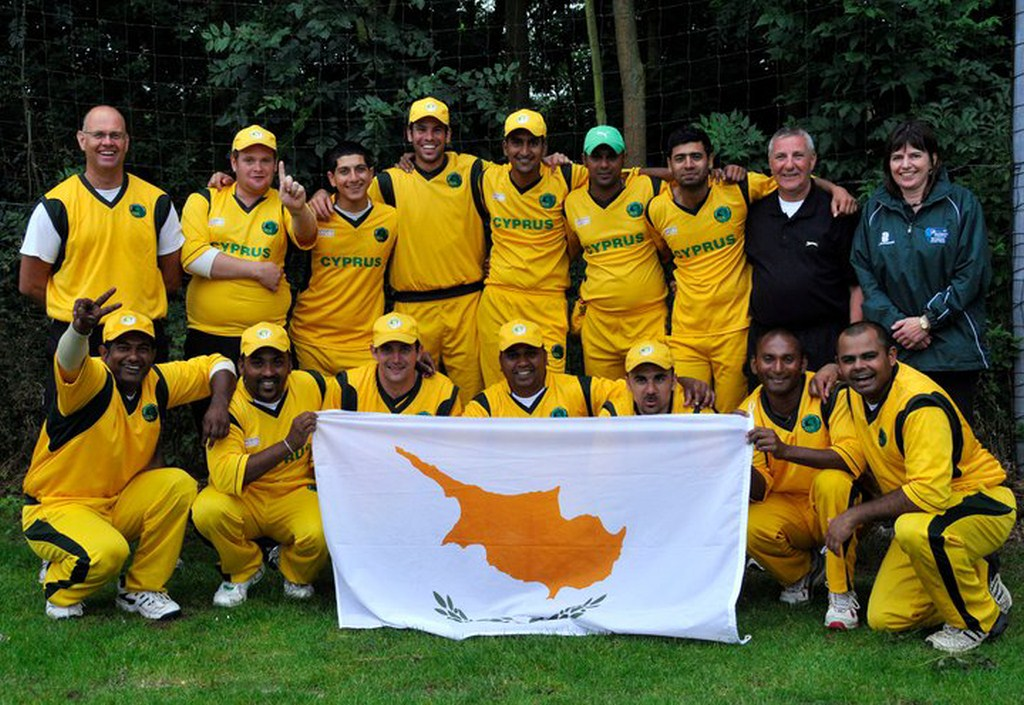
National team 2011

The following list contains the players in the Cyprus squad that competed at the ICC World T20 Europe Qualifier in July 2022.

Name	Age	Batting style	Bowling style	Domestic team	Format	S/N	Remarks
Gurpratap Singh	32	Right-handed	Right-arm medium	Punjab Lions	T20I	12	Captain
Muhammad Husain	45	Right-handed	Right-arm off break	Cyprus Moufflons	T20I	1	
Tejwinder Singh	35	Right-handed	Right-arm Fast	Punjab Lions	T20I	18	-
Neeraj Tiwari	32	Right-handed	Right-arm off break	Punjab Lions	T20I	45	-
Akila de Silva	31	Left-handed	Right-arm off break	Sri Lankan Nicosia	-	92	-
Iftekar Jaman	34	Right-handed	Right-arm medium	Nicosia Tigers	T20I	89	-
Riyaz Kajalwala	40	Right-handed	Slow left-arm orthodox	Cyprus Moufflons	-	24	-
Muhammad Farooq	38	Right-handed	Right-arm medium	Limassol Qalandars	-	17	-
Shoaib Ahmad	45	Right-handed	Right-arm medium	Riyaan	-	10	-
Roman Mazumder	33	Right-handed	Right-arm off break	Nicosia Tigers	T20I	42	-
Nalin Pathirana	42	Right-handed	Right-arm medium	Sri Lankan Lions Limassol	T20I	55	Wicket-keeper
Chamal Sadun	36	Left-handed	Right-arm medium	Sri Lankan Lions Limassol	T20I	11	-
Scott Austin	28	Right-handed	Right-arm medium	Cyprus Moufflons	T20I	222	-
Ruwan Manawasingha	45	Right-handed	Right-arm off break	Sri Lankan Lions Limassol	-	3	-

== Coaching staff ==
- Head Coach – Ruel Brathwaite

== Records ==
International Match Summary — Cyprus

Last updated 22 May 2026.

Playing Record
Format	M	W	L	T	NR	Inaugural Match
Twenty20 Internationals	42	22	20	0	0	5 October 2021

=== Twenty20 International ===
T20I record versus other nations

Records complete to T20I #3895. Last updated 22 May 2026.

Opponent	M	W	L	T	NR	First match	First win
vs Associate Members
Austria	2	1	1	0	0	14 March 2026	14 March 2026
Bulgaria	4	4	0	0	0	2 November 2025	2 November 2025
Croatia	5	4	1	0	0	7 August 2025	7 August 2025
Czech Republic	1	0	1	0	0	25 August 2024	
Denmark	1	0	1	0	0	27 August 2024	
Estonia	10	6	4	0	0	5 October 2021	5 October 2021
Finland	5	1	4	0	0	19 July 2022	8 May 2026
France	1	0	1	0	0	16 May 2026	
Greece	1	1	0	0	0	24 August 2024	24 August 2024
Isle of Man	3	0	3	0	0	6 October 2021	
Jersey	1	0	1	0	0	17 May 2026	
Malta	1	1	0	0	0	28 August 2024	28 August 2024
Romania	1	1	0	0	0	13 July 2022	13 July 2022
Serbia	3	2	1	0	0	18 July 2022	31 October 2025
Spain	1	0	1	0	0	21 August 2024	
Switzerland	1	0	1	0	0	20 May 2026	
Turkey	1	1	0	0	0	16 July 2022	16 July 2022

=== Other results ===
For a list of selected international matches played by Cyprus, see Cricket Archive.

== See also ==
- List of Cyprus Twenty20 International cricketers
- Cyprus women's national cricket team
