= Twenty20 International =

Form of cricket

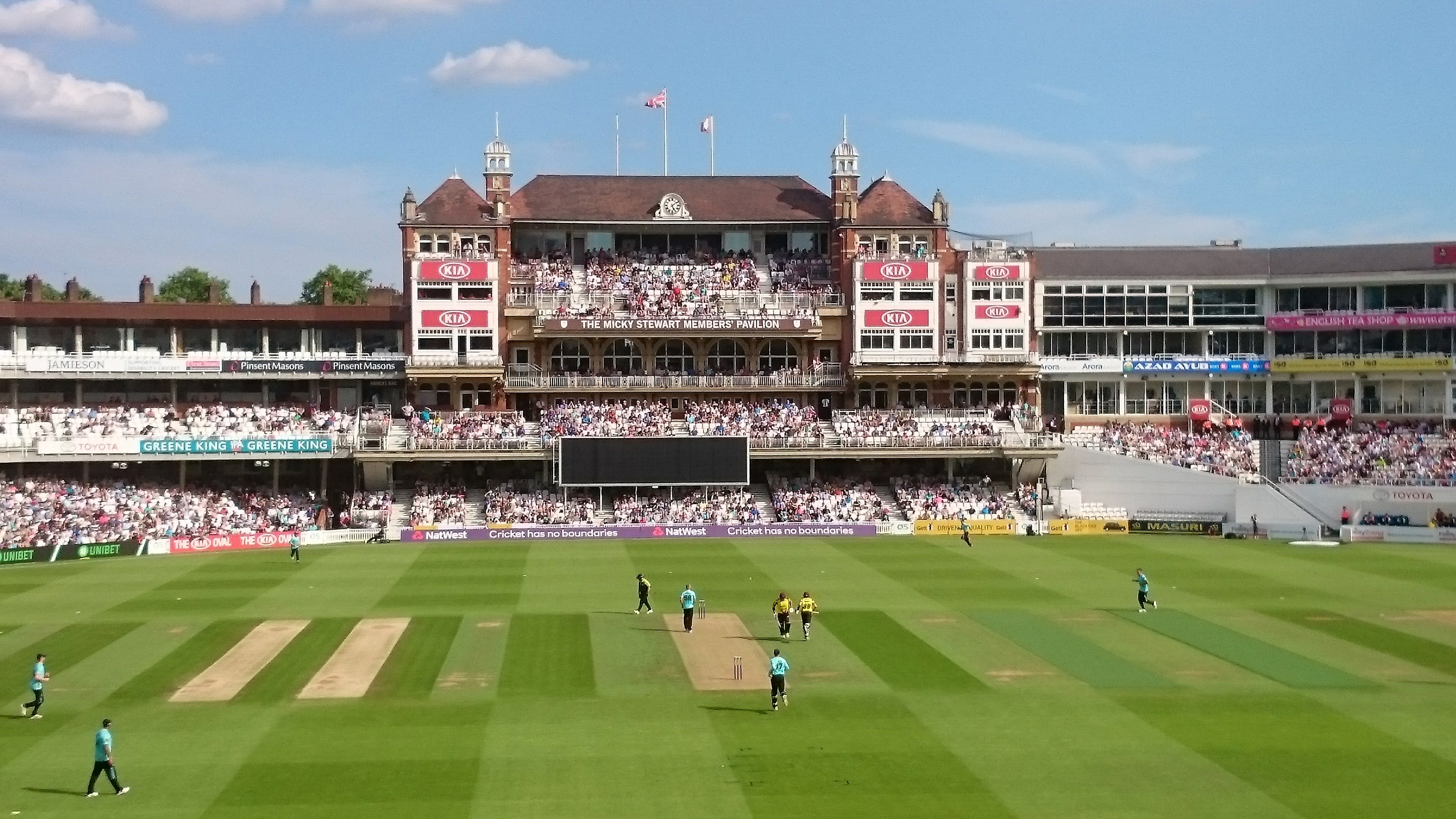
- A Twenty20 match at the Oval in south London
- Highest governing body: International Cricket Council
- Nicknames: T20I
- First played: 17 February 2005

Characteristics
- Team members: ICC members
- Mixed-sex: No
- Type: outdoor
- Equipment: ball, bat, stumps, glove, pad, helmet

Twenty20 International (T20I) is a form of Twenty20 cricket, in which each team plays a single innings with a maximum of twenty overs. The matches are played between international teams recognized by the International Cricket Council (ICC). In the T20I format, each bowler is restricted to a maximum of four overs. A mandatory powerplay is taken during the first six overs of an innings.

The first T20I match took place on 17 February 2005 between Australia and New Zealand, with the first ICC T20 World Cup held in 2007. The matches were initially held between the full members of the ICC and selected associate member teams. In April 2018, the ICC announced that it would grant T20I status to matches played amongst any of all its 105 members from 1 January 2019. As of March 2025, 100 nations feature in ICC T20I team rankings. The number of matches of the format increased in the 2010s and more T20I matches (100) were played than ODI matches (99) for the first time in 2016.

As of March 2026, India has the most wins (187) while Pakistan has played the most matches (299). Babar Azam holds the record for the most runs and Rashid Khan of Afghanistan holds the record for the most career wickets (193). The highest individual score is 172, made by Australia's Aaron Finch against Zimbabwe in 2018, while Malaysia's Syazrul Idrus recorded the best bowling figures of 7/8 against China in July 2023.

== Origins ==
Cricket itself was probably first played in England in the Late Middle Ages, but it did not rise to prominence until the eighteenth century. A set of laws were drawn up in 1744, and the game achieved a level of relative standardisation by the late nineteenth century. One-day cricket was trialled in 1962, the first domestic tournament played in 1963, and in 1971, England and Australia contested the first One Day International. The match consisted of one innings for each side, with 40 eight-ball overs. Various lengths of overs & number of balls were played until the 1990s when 50 overs each comprising 6 deliveries was standardised worldwide.

In the 1990s, a number of countries explored the possibility of a shorter game still: in New Zealand, Martin Crowe developed Cricket Max, in which each team bats for 10 eight-ball overs, while in Australia an eight-a-side contest dubbed "Super 8s" was considered. At the same time, the England and Wales Cricket Board (ECB) conducted consumer research, and proposed the idea of a 20 overs-per-side contest, which would last for about three hours. The first match was played in 2003 between Hampshire and Sussex.

== History ==
The first Twenty20 International match between two men's sides was played on 17 February 2005, involving Australia and New Zealand. Wisden Cricketers' Almanack reported that "neither side took the game especially seriously", and it was noted by ESPNcricinfo that but for a large score for Ricky Ponting, "the concept would have shuddered". However, Ponting himself said "if it does become an international game then I'm sure the novelty won't be there all the time".

Two further matches were played in 2005; England beat Australia in June, and South Africa were defeated by New Zealand in October. Early in 2006, a contest between New Zealand and the West Indies finished as the first tied match, and a tiebreak was played for the first time in men's international cricket: the two sides took part in a bowl-out to determine a winner; New Zealand won 3–0.

Initially, the game was developed to boost the interest in domestic cricket, and to aid this the international teams were only allowed to host three T20Is each year. The cricket manager for the ICC, David Richardson, also commented that "Part of the success of Twenty20 cricket is making sure it can coexist with Test cricket and one-dayers." Despite this, the first international tournament was held in 2007 in South Africa; the 2007 ICC World Twenty20. That tournament was won by India, who defeated their close rivals Pakistan in the final. Writing for The Guardian, Dilip Premachandran suggested that the competition's success meant that "the format is here to stay". The next tournament was scheduled for 2009, and it was decided that they would take place biannually (more frequently than the 50 over Cricket World Cup, which occurs once every four years). In the opening match of the 2007 World Twenty20, Chris Gayle scored the first century in a T20I, the achievement being reached in the twentieth match of the format.

The 500th T20I match was contested between Ireland and the United Arab Emirates at the Sheikh Zayed Stadium, Abu Dhabi on 16 February 2016. ICC decided to use the Decision Review System (DRS) in Twenty20 Internationals from the end of September 2017, with its first use in the India-Australia T20I series in October 2017.

== International rankings ==
Current ICC members by membership status: Full members (12) Associate members with ODI status (8) Associate members (85) Former members (4) Non-members

ICC Men's T20I Team Rankings
Team	Matches	Points	Rating
England	41	11,021	269
India	76	20,268	267
Australia	38	9,868	260
New Zealand	55	13,638	248
South Africa	53	12,881	243
Pakistan	62	14,883	241
West Indies	60	14,155	236
Bangladesh	55	12,220	222
Sri Lanka	52	11,489	221
Afghanistan	44	9,679	220
Ireland	29	5,942	205
Zimbabwe	62	12,417	200
United States	20	3,650	183
Nepal	44	7,968	181
Netherlands	24	4,311	180
Namibia	41	7,358	179
Scotland	23	4,116	179
United Arab Emirates	57	9,961	175
Oman	44	6,698	152
Canada	26	3,864	149
Uganda	52	7,331	141
Papua New Guinea	20	2,743	137
Italy	15	1,988	133
Hong Kong	55	7,154	130
Malaysia	59	7,409	126
Kuwait	35	4,360	125
Spain	16	1,961	123
Qatar	41	4,925	120
Jersey	21	2,484	118
Bahrain	71	8,393	118
Saudi Arabia	31	3,551	115
Bermuda	24	2,713	113
Kenya	50	5,434	109
Tanzania	30	2,967	99
Portugal	28	2,525	90
Guernsey	24	2,028	85
Denmark	20	1,682	84
Germany	30	2,488	83
Cayman Islands	28	2,295	82
Nigeria	52	4,187	81
Japan	40	2,931	73
Singapore	36	2,555	71
Austria	66	4,293	65
Sweden	36	2,151	60
Belgium	33	1,923	58
Finland	29	1,623	56
Norway	36	2,006	56
Argentina	14	728	54
France	35	1,753	50
Romania	43	2,134	50
Switzerland	26	1,260	48
Cook Islands	14	649	46
Rwanda	72	3,264	45
Botswana	40	1,778	44
Samoa	21	933	44
Malawi	41	1,807	44
Isle of Man	12	511	43
Philippines	29	1,191	41
Thailand	41	1,635	40
Cambodia	29	1,435	38
Bahamas	20	762	38
Cyprus	26	892	34
Czech Republic	21	716	34
Malta	39	1,326	34
Indonesia	87	2,943	34
Vanuatu	15	491	33
Eswatini	22	713	32
Zambia	21	677	32
South Korea	21	636	30
Ghana	19	571	30
Hungary	35	1,014	29
Panama	15	371	25
Estonia	21	513	24
Cameroon	10	213	21
Falkland Islands	11	223	20
Bhutan	32	642	20
Belize	7	139	20
Mexico	25	445	18
Luxembourg	24	410	17
Brazil	21	353	17
Gibraltar	25	412	16
Mozambique	22	347	16
Israel	12	160	13
Sierra Leone	38	452	12
Maldives	17	167	10
Suriname	10	82	8
Bulgaria	25	202	8
Gambia	8	57	7
Croatia	24	169	7
Seychelles	7	46	7
Serbia	27	112	4
Lesotho	21	80	4
Turkey	17	63	4
Costa Rica	20	55	3
Fiji	9	19	2
Myanmar	29	50	2
Timor-Leste	8	0	0
Ivory Coast	9	0	0
Mongolia	12	0	0
Saint Helena	7	0	0
Slovenia	17	0	0
Mali	10	0	0
Greece	6	0	0
China	13	0	0
Source: ICC Men's T20I Team Rankings, 19 November 2026 See points calculations for more details.

== Teams with T20I status ==
=== Permanent T20I status ===
Prior to 2019, permanent T20I status was limited to the Test-playing nations (the full members of the ICC), which included 12 teams after the promotion of Afghanistan and Ireland to full member status in 2017. In April 2018, the ICC announced that it would grant T20I status to all of its members from 1 January 2019. Nations that have played T20I cricket are listed below, with the date of their first T20I after gaining permanent T20I status shown in brackets (teams in italics had previously played T20Is with temporary status):

1. Australia (17 February 2005)
2. New Zealand (17 February 2005)
3. England (13 June 2005)
4. South Africa (21 October 2005)
5. West Indies (16 February 2006)
6. Sri Lanka (15 June 2006)
7. Pakistan (28 August 2006)
8. Bangladesh (28 November 2006)
9. Zimbabwe (28 November 2006)
10. India (1 December 2006)
11. Afghanistan (5 February 2018)
12. Ireland (12 June 2018)
13. Bahrain (20 January 2019)
14. Kuwait (20 January 2019)
15. Maldives (20 January 2019)
16. Saudi Arabia (20 January 2019)
17. Qatar (21 January 2019)
18. Nepal (31 January 2019)
19. United Arab Emirates (31 January 2019)
20. Netherlands (13 February 2019)
21. Oman (13 February 2019)
22. Scotland (13 February 2019)
23. United States (15 March 2019)
24. Papua New Guinea (22 March 2019)
25. Philippines (22 March 2019)
26. Vanuatu (22 March 2019)
27. Malta (29 March 2019)
28. Spain (29 March 2019)
29. Belize (25 April 2019)
30. Costa Rica (25 April 2019)
31. Mexico (25 April 2019)
32. Panama (25 April 2019)
33. Belgium (11 May 2019)
34. Germany (11 May 2019)
35. Botswana (20 May 2019)
36. Ghana (20 May 2019)
37. Kenya (20 May 2019)
38. Namibia (20 May 2019)
39. Nigeria (20 May 2019)
40. Uganda (20 May 2019)
41. Italy (25 May 2019)
42. Guernsey (31 May 2019)
43. Jersey (31 May 2019)
44. Norway (15 June 2019)
45. Denmark (16 June 2019)
46. Malaysia (24 June 2019)
47. Thailand (24 June 2019)
48. Samoa (8 July 2019)
49. Finland (13 July 2019)
50. Singapore (22 July 2019)
51. Bermuda (18 August 2019)
52. Canada (18 August 2019)
53. Cayman Islands (18 August 2019)
54. Austria (29 August 2019)
55. Luxembourg (29 August 2019)
56. Romania (29 August 2019)
57. Turkey (29 August 2019)
58. Czech Republic (30 August 2019)
59. Argentina (3 October 2019)
60. Brazil (3 October 2019)
61. Chile (3 October 2019)
62. Peru (3 October 2019)
63. Hong Kong (5 October 2019)
64. Bulgaria (14 October 2019)
65. Serbia (14 October 2019)
66. Greece (15 October 2019)
67. Portugal (25 October 2019)
68. Gibraltar (26 October 2019)
69. Malawi (6 November 2019)
70. Mozambique (6 November 2019)
71. Bhutan (5 December 2019)
72. Iran (23 February 2020)
73. Isle of Man (21 August 2020)
74. France (5 August 2021)
75. Sweden (14 August 2021)
76. Rwanda (18 August 2021)
77. Hungary (2 September 2021)
78. Cyprus (5 October 2021)
79. Estonia (5 October 2021)
80. Eswatini (16 October 2021)
81. Lesotho (16 October 2021)
82. Seychelles (16 October 2021)
83. Sierra Leone (19 October 2021)
84. Switzerland (22 October 2021)
85. Tanzania (2 November 2021)
86. Cameroon (3 November 2021)
87. Bahamas (7 November 2021)
88. Israel (28 June 2022)
89. Croatia (13 July 2022)
90. Slovenia (25 July 2022)
91. Cook Islands (9 September 2022)
92. Fiji (9 September 2022)
93. Indonesia (9 October 2022)
94. Japan (9 October 2022)
95. South Korea (15 October 2022)
96. Mali (17 November 2022)
97. Saint Helena (17 November 2022)
98. Gambia (1 December 2022)
99. Cambodia (4 May 2023)
100. China (26 July 2023)
101. Myanmar (26 July 2023)
102. Mongolia (27 September 2023)
103. Ivory Coast (23 November 2024)
104. Suriname (6 December 2024)
105. Falkland Islands (10 March 2025)
106. Turks and Caicos Islands (17 April 2025)
107. Timor-Leste (6 November 2025)
108. Zambia (4 December 2025)
109. Uzbekistan (22 June 2026)

=== Temporary T20I status ===
Between 2005 and 2018, the ICC granted temporary ODI and T20I status to a selection of other teams (known as Associate members). Teams earned this temporary status for a period of four years based on their performance in the quadrennial ICC World Cricket League – or, more specifically, based on the top six finishing positions at the ICC World Cup Qualifier, which is the final event of the World Cricket League. Teams could also earn this status by qualifying for the ICC T20 World Cup.

Twelve nations held this temporary T20I status before gaining permanent T20I status or losing status after underperforming at the World Cup Qualifier or World Twenty20 Qualifier (dates shown are for the first and last matches played while holding temporary T20I status, not when this status was gained, lost or changed to permanent):

- Kenya (from 1 September 2007, until 30 January 2014)
- Scotland (from 12 September 2007, until 20 June 2018)
- Ireland (from 2 August 2008, until 12 March 2017)
- Netherlands (from 2 August 2008, until 29 July 2018)
- Canada (from 2 August 2008, until 28 January 2014)
- Bermuda (from 3 August 2008, until 8 April 2009)
- Afghanistan (from 1 February 2010, until 5 June 2017)
- Nepal (from 16 March 2014, until 29 July 2018)
- Hong Kong (from 16 March 2014, until 18 January 2017)
- United Arab Emirates (from 17 March 2014, until 22 October 2018)
- Papua New Guinea (from 13 July 2015, until 17 March 2018)
- Oman (from 25 July 2015, until 19 January 2017)

The ICC has also given special T20I status to the ICC World XI team for:

- The 2017 Independence Cup, a three match series versus Pakistan national team to help revive international cricket in Pakistan.
- The Hurricane Relief T20 Challenge, a one-off match against West Indies on 31 May 2018, to raise funds for stadiums damaged by Hurricane Irma and Hurricane Maria in September 2017.

== Cricket at international multi-sport events ==
Cricket was played as part of the 1900 Summer Olympics, when England and France contested a two-day match. In 1998, cricket was played as part of the Commonwealth Games, on this occasion in the 50-over format. There was some talk about Twenty20 cricket being part of the 2010 Commonwealth Games, which were held in Delhi, but at the time the Board of Control for Cricket in India (BCCI), were not in favour of the short format of the game, and it was not included.

Cricket was played in 2010 Asian Games in Guangzhou, China and 2014 Asian Games in Incheon, South Korea. India skipped both times. There was further calls for subsequent Commonwealth Games and Olympic Games. The Commonwealth Games Federation asked the ICC to participate in the 2014 and 2018 Commonwealth Games, but the ICC turned down the invitation. In 2010, the International Olympic Committee recognised the International Cricket Council as a governing body that complied to the requirements of the Olympic charter which in turn meant that cricket could apply to be included in the Olympic Games, but in 2013 the ICC announced that it had no intentions to make such an application, primarily due to opposition from the BCCI. ESPNcricinfo suggested that the opposition might be based on the possible loss of income. In April 2016, ICC chief executive David Richardson said that Twenty20 cricket can have a chance of getting in for the 2024 Summer Games, but there must be collective support shown by the ICC's membership base, in particular from BCCI, in order for there to be a chance of inclusion.

== Statistics ==
Rohit Sharma and Glenn Maxwell are the only players to score 5 T20I tons.

The highest team total in a T20I was made by Zimbabwe versus Gambia when they scored 344/4. The lowest total was recorded in 2024, when Nigeria bowled out Ivory Coast for just 7 runs. The highest successful chase was made in March 2023, when South Africa scored 259 runs to overhaul West Indies's target and win the match.

As of November 2025, Babar Azam has scored the most runs in the format. Aaron Finch has made the highest individual score in T20Is, with his innings of 172 against Zimbabwe in 2018. Afghanistan bowler Rashid Khan holds the records for the most wickets taken in the format.

== See also ==
- List of International Cricket Council members
- Women's Twenty20 International
- List of Twenty20 International records
