= Estonia national cricket team =

Estonia
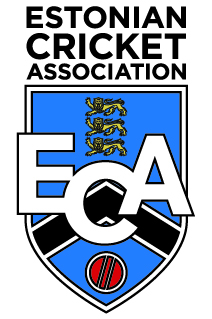

Personnel
- Captain: Arslan Amjad
- Manager: Stuart Hook

International Cricket Council
- ICC status: Associate member with T20I status (2017)
- ICC region: Europe
ICC Rankings	Current	Best-ever
T20I	71st	65th (24 Aug 2024)

International cricket
- First international: 24 July 1999

T20 Internationals
- First T20I: v Cyprus at Happy Valley Ground, Episkopi; 5 October 2021
- Last T20I: v Serbia at Koge Cricket Club, Køge; 14 July 2026
T20Is	Played	Won/Lost
Total	39	13/26 (0 ties, 0 no results)
This year	5	2/3 (0 ties, 0 no results)
T20I kit
- As of 14 July 2026

The Estonian national cricket team is the team that represents Estonia in international cricket. They were granted affiliate status in June 2008 by the International Cricket Council (ICC).

The most famous tourists to Estonia have been Shane Warne and Elizabeth Hurley, who supported the ICC event in 2012. Sir Tim Rice, and his team the Heartaches, the MCC, the Lord's Taverners and most recently Carmel & District Cricket Club captained by Timothy Abraham.

In April 2018, the ICC decided to grant full Twenty20 International (T20I) status to all its members. Therefore, all Twenty20 matches played between Estonia and other ICC members after 1 January 2019 have the full T20I status.

== Highlights ==
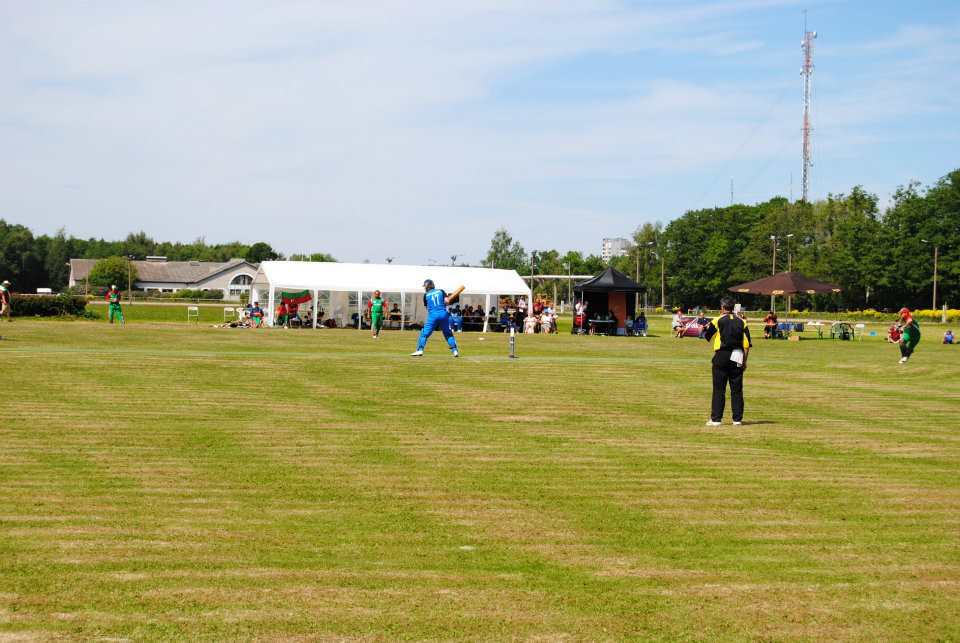
Estonian Cricket at Tallinn Hippdroom

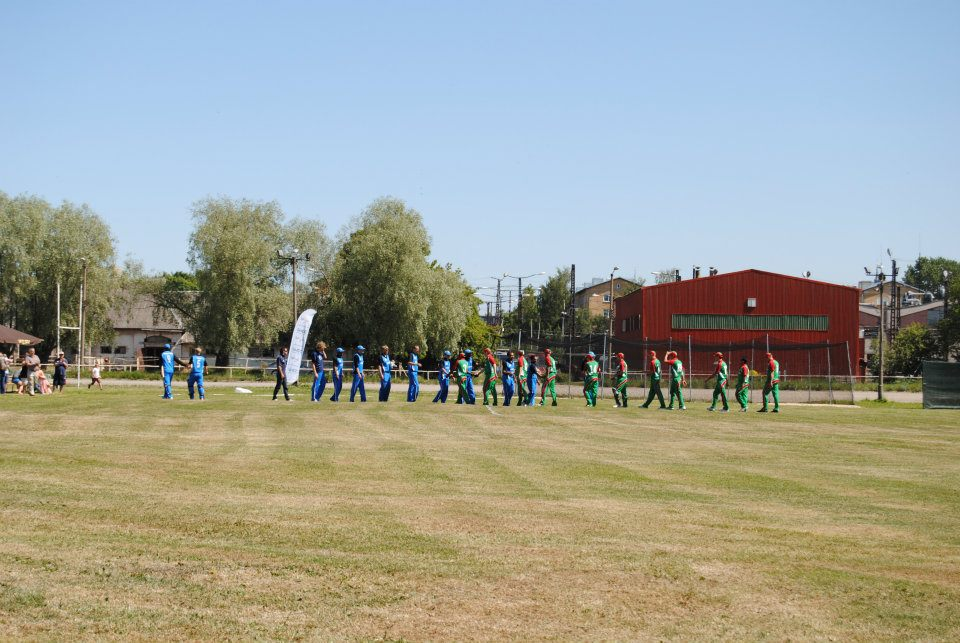
Estonian Cricket at Tallinn Hippdroom

In the 2007 season, Estonia won over 80% of all their games and in 2008 they won 94% of their games (34 out of 36).

In May 2011, Estonia competed in the European T20 Division 3 Championships in Slovenia, where after all matches were completed, they finished as runners-up to a highly experienced Swedish national team. In August 2011, Estonia finished its international fixtures for the year, by becoming Baltic Champions in a final win over the Lithuanian cricket team. During the European T20 Division 3 Championships in Slovenia. Captain Tim Heath scored a remarkable 113 off 45 deliveries. Other significant highlights include:

- 2008 Estonia competed won an invitational non-ICC event in Wales
- 2009 Estonia competed in a 50 over ICC competition in Corfu, finishing mid table
- 2012 Estonia won a round-robin ICC competition in Tallinn against Slovenia and Bulgaria
- 2012 Estonia competed in a T20 ICC competition in Corfu, finishing mid-table
- 2019 Estonia played Spain and Malta in La Manga, Spain during the 2019 Spain Triangular T20I Series. They lost all their matches.

== Domestic cricket ==
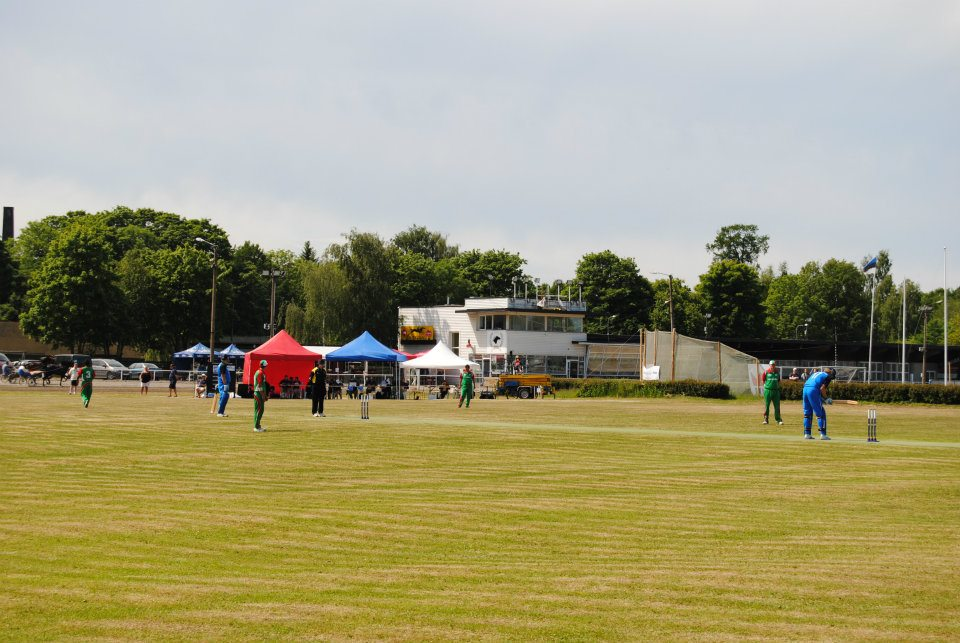
Estonian Cricket at Tallinn Hippdroom

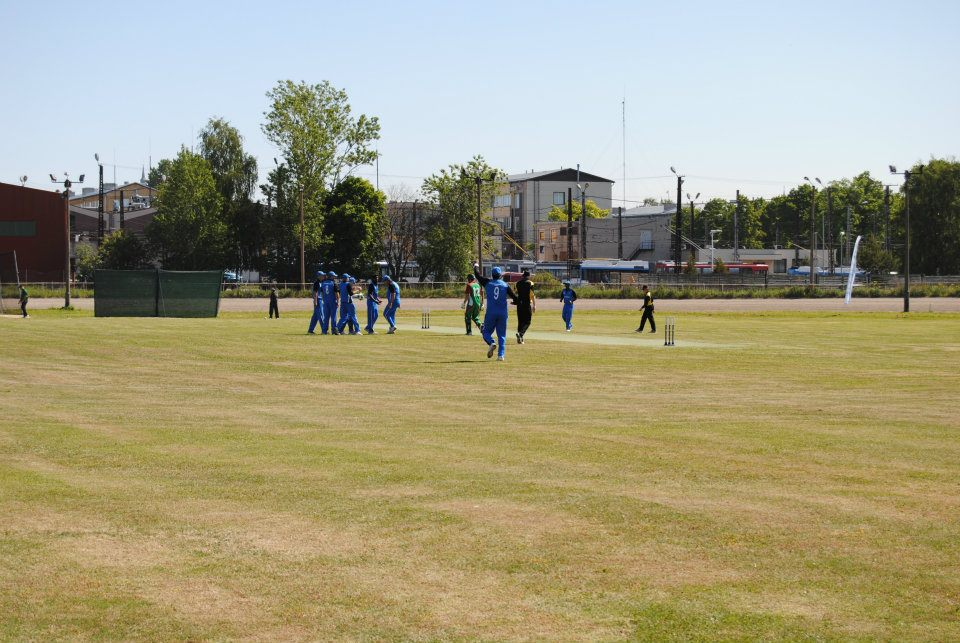
Estonian Cricket at Tallinn Hippdroom

2007 saw the formation of the Estonian cricket league, which consists of four Tallinn-based teams who compete in a round-robin format. Players who are members of the Estonian Cricket League are eligible to be selected for the national side. 2007 and 2008 saw a victory for Kalev CC captained by Andres Burget.

The national competition has seen significant restructure and growth in recent times and in 2020 saw a reshuffle of the domestic league, with 8 teams playing in the league. The further expansion continued in 2021, when the domestic league grew to 12 teams competing. The current clubs include:

- Eesti Tigers
- Tallinn Hippos
- Tallinn Rising Stars
- Tallinn Stallions
- Tallinn Strikers
- Tartu KK
- Tallinn United
- Viking Stars
- Tallinn Riders
- EFP Eagles
- Tartu Wolves
- Tallinn United Falcons

The Estonian domestic and premier league competitions have shown consistent growth in recent years, accompanied by an ongoing regional development program. The number of locally developed Estonian players has increased, supported by the experience of expatriate players from full member nations who reside in Estonia. These individuals have contributed to the development of the sport by sharing their experience and providing guidance to emerging local players.

== Grounds ==
Locations of all stadiums which have hosted international cricket matches within Estonia

== Records ==
International Match Summary — Estonia

Last updated 14 July 2026.

Playing Record
Format	M	W	L	T	NR	Inaugural Match
Twenty20 Internationals	39	13	26	0	0	5 October 2021

=== Twenty20 International ===
T20I record versus other nations

Records complete to T20I #4033. Last updated 14 July 2026.

Opponent	M	W	L	T	NR	First match	First win
vs Associate Members
Bulgaria	1	1	0	0	0	24 August 2024	24 August 2024
Cyprus	10	4	6	0	0	5 October 2021	17 June 2024
Czech Republic	2	1	1	0	0	28 July 2022	28 August 2024
Denmark	1	0	1	0	0	8 July 2026	
Finland	6	2	4	0	0	19 June 2022	22 August 2024
France	1	0	1	0	0	30 July 2022	
Gibraltar	2	1	1	0	0	30 September 2023	30 September 2023
Guernsey	1	0	1	0	0	25 August 2024	
Hungary	1	0	1	0	0	10 July 2026	
Isle of Man	2	0	2	0	0	6 October 2021	
Malta	4	2	2	0	0	27 August 2024	27 August 2024
Norway	2	0	2	0	0	24 July 2022	
Serbia	1	1	0	0	0	14 July 2026	14 July 2026
Switzerland	4	0	4	0	0	27 July 2022	
Turkey	1	1	0	0	0	13 July 2026	13 July 2026

=== Other results ===
For a list of selected international matches played by Estonia, see Cricket Archive.

== See also ==
- Estonia women's national cricket team
- List of Estonia Twenty20 International cricketers

== Sources ==
- Slogging The Slavs: A Paranormal Cricket Tour from the Baltic to the Bosphorus, by Angus Bell
