= Lisicji Jarak Cricket Ground =

Cricket ground

Ground information
- Location: Belgrade, Serbia
- Country: Serbia
- Coordinates: 44°56′0″N 20°26′33″E

International information
- First T20I: 8 July 2022: Serbia v Bulgaria
- Last T20I: 9 July 2022: Serbia v Bulgaria
- First WT20I: 14 September 2024: Serbia v Cyprus
- Last WT20I: 13 October 2024: Serbia v Bulgaria
- As of 13 October 2024; Source: Ground Profile

Lisicji Jarak Cricket Ground is a cricket ground in Belgrade, Serbia. In July 2022, the venue hosted the Twenty20 International (T20I) matches, between Serbia and Bulgaria.
