= Bulgarian cricket team in Serbia in 2022 =

International cricket tour

	Serbia	Bulgaria
- Dates: 8 – 9 July 2022
Captains	Robin Vitas (Note: Mark Pavlovic captained Serbia for the 3rd T20I.)	Prakash Mishra

Twenty20 International series
- Results: Serbia won the 3-match series 2–1
Most runs	Simo Ivetic (149)	Omar Rassol (160)
Most wickets	Alister Gajic (7)	Hristo Lakov (4)

The Bulgaria cricket team toured Serbia from 8 to 9 July 2022 to play a three-match Twenty20 International (T20I) bilateral series against hosts Serbia. Bulgaria won their previous series earlier in June during the 2022 Sofia Twenty20. The series was played at the Lisicji Jarak Cricket Ground in Belgrade. The series provided both teams with preparation for the 2022–23 ICC Men's T20 World Cup Europe Qualifier subregional tournaments.

== Squads ==
Bulgaria	Serbia
Prakash Mishra (c); Hristo Lakov (vc); Jacob Albin; Sulaiman Ali; Aravinda De Silva; Kevin D'Souza; Saim Hussain (wk); Mukul Kadyan; Ivaylo Katzarski; Fayaz Mohammad; Sandeep Nair; Dimo Nikolov; Omar Rassol (wk); Asad Ali Rehemtulla; Delrick Varghese; Tarun Yadav	Robin Vitas (c); Mark Pavlovic (vc); Wintley Burton; Alexander Dizija; Aleksa Djorovic; Bogdan Dugic; Leslie Dunbar (wk); Alister Gajic; Simo Ivetic; Nicholas Johns-Wickberg; Matthew Kostic; Ayo Mene-Ejegi; Matija Sarenac; Sachin Shinde; Slobodan Tosic; Nemanja Zimonjic; Vukasin Zimonjic

== T20I series ==
=== 1st T20I ===
8 July 2022
17:00
Scorecard

Bulgaria; 152/9 (20 overs)	v	Serbia; 155/3 (18.2 overs)
Prakash Mishra 55 (32); Alister Gajic 3/26 (3 overs)		Simo Ivetic 65* (57); Prakash Mishra 1/18 (4 overs)

Serbia won by 7 wickets
Lisicji Jarak Cricket Ground, Belgrade
Umpires: Ivan Dimitrov (Bul) and Dragan Djokic (Srb)
Player of the match: Ayo Mene-Ejegi (Srb)

- Serbia won the toss and elected to field.
- Alister Gajic, Simo Ivetic, Mark Pavlovic (Srb) and Tarun Yadav (Bul) all made their T20I debuts.

=== 2nd T20I ===
9 July 2022
10:00
Scorecard

Bulgaria; 154/9 (20 overs)	v	Serbia; 157/2 (19.3 overs)
Omar Rassol 61 (40); Alister Gajic 4/12 (4 overs)		Simo Ivetic 61* (44); Prakash Mishra 1/24 (4 overs)

Serbia won by 8 wickets
Lisicji Jarak Cricket Ground, Belgrade
Umpires: Ivan Dimitrov (Bul) and Dragan Djokic (Srb)
Player of the match: Wintley Burton (Srb)

- Serbia won the toss and elected to field.

=== 3rd T20I ===
9 July 2022
15:00
Scorecard

Bulgaria; 206/5 (20 overs)	v	Serbia; 111 (18.5 overs)
Omar Rassol 99* (56); Matija Sarenac 1/17 (3 overs)		Simo Ivetic 23 (11); Hristo Lakov 3/21 (4 overs)

Bulgaria won by 95 runs
Lisicji Jarak Cricket Ground, Belgrade
Umpires: Ivan Dimitrov (Bul) and Dragan Djokic (Srb)
Player of the match: Omar Rassol (Bul)

- Serbia won the toss and elected to field.
- Sachin Shinde (Srb) made his T20I debut.
