= List of Bulgaria Twenty20 International cricketers =

This is a list of Bulgarian Twenty20 International cricketers. In April 2018, the ICC decided to grant full Twenty20 International (T20I) status to all its members. Therefore, all Twenty20 matches played between Bulgaria and other ICC members after 1 January 2019 will be eligible to have T20I status.

This list comprises all members of the Bulgaria cricket team who have played at least one T20I match. It is initially arranged in the order in which each player won his first Twenty20 cap. Where more than one player won his first Twenty20 cap in the same match, those players are listed alphabetically by surname. Bulgaria played their first T20I matches during the 2019 Hellenic Premier League in October 2019.

== Key ==
General

- ‡ – Captain
- † – Wicket-keeper
- First – Year of debut
- Last – Year of latest game
- Mat – Number of matches played

Batting

- Runs – Runs scored in career
- HS – Highest score
- Avg – Runs scored per dismissal
- 50 – Number of half centuries
- 100 – Number of centuries
- * – Batsman remained not out

Bowling

- Balls – Balls bowled in career
- Wkt – Wickets taken in career
- BBI – Best bowling in an innings
- Ave – Average runs per wicket

Fielding

- Ca – Catches taken
- St – Stumpings affected

== List of players ==
Statistics are correct as of 21 August 2026.

Bulgaria T20I cricketers
| General | | | | | Batting | | | | | Bowling | | | | Fielding | | Ref |
| No. | Name | First | Last | Mat | Runs | HS | Avg | 50 | 100 | Balls | Wkt | BBI | Ave | Ca | St | Ref |
|---|---|---|---|---|---|---|---|---|---|---|---|---|---|---|---|---|
| 1 | Agagyul Ahmadhel | 2019 | 2024 | 12 | 33 | 15 | 4.71 | 0 | 0 | 106 | 6 | 2/16 | 25.83 | 1 | 0 | |
| 2 | Kiran Dasan† | 2019 | 2020 | 10 | 237 | 74 | 29.62 | 1 | 0 | 48 | 4 | 3/23 | 13.00 | 3 | 2 | |
| 3 | Valter Dikov | 2019 | 2019 | 3 | – | – | – | – | – | – | – | – | – | 0 | 0 | |
| 4 | Boiko Ivanov | 2019 | 2024 | 11 | 60 | 21* | 20.00 | 0 | 0 | 12 | 0 | – | – | 2 | 0 | |
| 5 | Hristo Ivanov† | 2019 | 2021 | 13 | 47 | 15 | 6.71 | 0 | 0 | 12 | 0 | – | – | 7 | 0 | |
| 6 | Ivaylo Katzarski | 2019 | 2022 | 18 | 18 | 5 | 3.00 | 0 | 0 | 12 | 0 | – | – | 3 | 0 | |
| 7 | Hristo Lakov‡ | 2019 | 2026 | 54 | 1,391 | 80 | 34.77 | 9 | 0 | 881 | 38 | 3/21 | 31.02 | 29 | 0 | |
| 8 | Prakash Mishra‡ | 2019 | 2026 | 68 | 594 | 55 | 12.91 | 3 | 0 | 1,280 | 62 | 5/16 | 26.01 | 8 | 0 | |
| 9 | Nikolay Nankov | 2019 | 2021 | 5 | 15 | 14 | 7.50 | 0 | 0 | 18 | 1 | 1/13 | 28.00 | 3 | 0 | |
| 10 | Dimo Nikolov‡ | 2019 | 2026 | 34 | 130 | 42 | 6.19 | 0 | 0 | 120 | 5 | 2/23 | 39.20 | 11 | 0 | |
| 11 | Subinthan Soosiyakumar | 2019 | 2019 | 1 | 0 | 0 | 0.00 | 0 | 0 | 12 | 0 | – | – | 0 | 0 | |
| 12 | Nikolay Yordanov | 2019 | 2019 | 2 | 19 | 19* | 19.00 | 0 | 0 | 18 | 0 | – | – | 0 | 0 | |
| 13 | Bakhtiar Tahiri | 2020 | 2025 | 17 | 325 | 66 | 32.50 | 1 | 0 | 174 | 8 | 3/12 | 32.62 | 4 | 0 | |
| 14 | Rohan Bhavesh Patel | 2020 | 2021 | 10 | 7 | 3* | – | 0 | 0 | 126 | 7 | 2/20 | 23.71 | 3 | 0 | |
| 15 | Kevin D'Souza | 2020 | 2022 | 36 | 669 | 92* | 27.87 | 2 | 0 | 96 | 3 | 2/29 | 35.66 | 12 | 0 | |
| 16 | Aravinda De Silva | 2020 | 2022 | 35 | 795 | 100* | 24.84 | 4 | 1 | – | – | – | – | 2 | 0 | |
| 17 | Sulaiman Ali | 2020 | 2022 | 21 | 242 | 40 | 13.44 | 0 | 0 | 251 | 14 | 2/8 | 29.50 | 7 | 0 | |
| 18 | Delrick Varghese | 2020 | 2023 | 31 | 43 | 17 | 7.16 | 0 | 0 | 367 | 13 | 1/7 | 49.76 | 7 | 0 | |
| 19 | Fayaz Mohammad | 2020 | 2022 | 5 | 26 | 12 | 8.66 | 0 | 0 | 8 | 0 | – | – | 0 | 0 | |
| 20 | Asad Ali Rehemtulla | 2020 | 2022 | 16 | 42 | 16 | 6.00 | 0 | 0 | 280 | 17 | 4/24 | 23.76 | 4 | 0 | |
| 21 | Aswad Khan | 2021 | 2021 | 3 | 0 | 0 | 0.00 | 0 | 0 | 30 | 2 | 2/16 | 29.00 | 0 | 0 | |
| 22 | Jacob Albin | 2021 | 2022 | 25 | 130 | 19* | 16.25 | 0 | 0 | 240 | 9 | 2/19 | 48.66 | 4 | 0 | |
| 23 | Vasil Hristov† | 2021 | 2023 | 4 | 7 | 5 | 3.50 | 0 | 0 | – | – | – | – | 4 | 0 | |
| 24 | Mukul Kadyan | 2021 | 2022 | 12 | 120 | 50 | 15.00 | 1 | 0 | 180 | 9 | 2/20 | 28.55 | 0 | 0 | |
| 25 | Omar Rassol† | 2021 | 2024 | 24 | 392 | 99* | 20.63 | 3 | 0 | 108 | 4 | 2/29 | 53.50 | 6 | 0 | |
| 26 | Akshay Harikumar | 2021 | 2021 | 1 | 22 | 22 | 22.00 | 0 | 0 | – | – | – | – | 0 | 0 | |
| 27 | Ahsan Khan | 2021 | 2022 | 12 | 27 | 16* | 27.00 | 0 | 0 | 168 | 5 | 2/18 | 57.40 | 1 | 0 | |
| 28 | Andrey Lilov | 2021 | 2021 | 4 | 0 | 0 | 0.00 | 0 | 0 | – | – | – | – | 0 | 0 | |
| 29 | Saim Hussain† | 2022 | 2023 | 18 | 578 | 108* | 38.53 | 4 | 1 | – | – | – | – | 8 | 1 | |
| 30 | Sandeep Nair | 2022 | 2022 | 7 | – | – | – | – | – | 48 | 2 | 2/14 | 35.00 | 0 | 0 | |
| 31 | Karthik Pillai | 2022 | 2022 | 2 | – | – | – | – | – | 30 | 0 | – | – | 0 | 0 | |
| 32 | Tarun Yadav | 2022 | 2022 | 3 | 14 | 8 | 7.00 | 0 | 0 | 23 | 2 | 2/7 | 10.50 | 0 | 0 | |
| 33 | Rohit Dhiman | 2022 | 2022 | 4 | 17 | 9* | 8.50 | 0 | 0 | 66 | 3 | 1/20 | 28.00 | 0 | 0 | |
| 34 | Danyal Raja | 2023 | 2026 | 26 | 125 | 19 | 8.92 | 0 | 0 | 434 | 20 | 3/38 | 31.30 | 3 | 0 | |
| 35 | Gagandeep Singh | 2023 | 2026 | 19 | 42 | 13* | 7.00 | 0 | 0 | 270 | 8 | 2/11 | 54.12 | 9 | 0 | |
| 36 | Huzaif Yousuf | 2023 | 2026 | 8 | 19 | 9* | 19.00 | 0 | 0 | 70 | 2 | 1/2 | 66.50 | 0 | 0 | |
| 37 | Isa Zaroo | 2023 | 2026 | 31 | 605 | 78* | 23.26 | 2 | 0 | 54 | 4 | 2/28 | 22.75 | 18 | 0 | |
| 38 | Zaid Soulat† | 2023 | 2024 | 6 | 95 | 44* | 31.66 | 0 | 0 | – | – | – | – | 1 | 0 | |
| 39 | Zain Asif | 2023 | 2023 | 4 | 75 | 43 | 25.00 | 0 | 0 | – | – | – | – | 1 | 0 | |
| 40 | Zeerak Chughtai | 2023 | 2025 | 19 | 191 | 44 | 17.36 | 0 | 0 | 267 | 21 | 4/18 | 18.47 | 2 | 0 | |
| 41 | Firas Hussain | 2024 | 2026 | 12 | 108 | 40* | 15.42 | 0 | 0 | 102 | 4 | 1/15 | 39.50 | 4 | 0 | |
| 42 | Milen Gogev | 2024 | 2026 | 27 | 634 | 77* | 24.38 | 5 | 0 | 431 | 13 | 2/20 | 51.76 | 6 | 0 | |
| 43 | Jakob Gul† | 2024 | 2026 | 22 | 171 | 30 | 10.05 | 0 | 0 | 432 | 27 | 4/37 | 19.96 | 9 | 0 | |
| 44 | Manan Bashir† | 2024 | 2026 | 22 | 478 | 70 | 26.55 | 2 | 0 | – | – | – | – | 11 | 1 | |
| 45 | Waleed Waqar | 2024 | 2024 | 2 | 0 | 0* | – | 0 | 0 | 18 | 1 | 1/26 | 43.00 | 1 | 0 | |
| 46 | Ali Rasool | 2024 | 2026 | 11 | 11 | 4* | 3.66 | 0 | 0 | 84 | 3 | 2/18 | 52.66 | 1 | 0 | |
| 47 | Oscar Duff | 2024 | 2026 | 11 | 3 | 3 | 0.75 | 0 | 0 | 147 | 6 | 2/17 | 40.66 | 2 | 0 | |
| 48 | Anthony Dowling | 2024 | 2026 | 8 | 36 | 20* | 9.00 | 0 | 0 | 44 | 4 | 4/28 | 21.50 | 6 | 0 | |
| 49 | Joshua Dowling | 2025 | 2026 | 16 | 19 | 7 | 3.80 | 0 | 0 | 162 | 8 | 3/1 | 30.00 | 6 | 0 | |
| 50 | Kushaal Krishnakumar† | 2025 | 2026 | 15 | 324 | 77 | 23.14 | 0 | 0 | – | – | – | – | 7 | 2 | |
| 51 | Ivan Genchev† | 2026 | 2026 | 1 | 0 | 0 | 0.00 | 0 | 0 | – | – | – | – | 0 | 0 | |
