= Cricket in Serbia =

Amateur cricket began in Serbia in 2007 when two clubs, Stari Grad and Mirijevo, were founded in Belgrade. Haris Dajč, Vladimir Ninković, Darko Ivić and Nenad Dugić started organizing cricket training with the help of ex-Maharashtra player Amberish Sarang in October 2007. Soon new members and enthusiasts were added. With the help and support from Katherine Lawrence from the embassy of the United Kingdom, as well as Nandikesh Nayar and Vimal Kumar Yadav from the embassy of India, the full equipment was obtained as well as new instructors and players.

In 2009 the Serbia national cricket team, playing under the identity of the Belgrade Cricket Association, played their first international match against Slovenian club Mezica CC, winning one match, and losing one. The Serbian Cricket Federation was founded in 2009, and since then have been working hard on development all over the country.

== Current state and development ==
Currently, Serbia have 120 registered cricketers, with plans to expand that to hopefully around 500 in the next few years. Although Serbia are not an ICC member yet, cricket has got the support of the Serbian government, who donate money to Serbian cricket. As a result of that, and their success of finding a number of sponsorship deals, Serbian cricket is completely self-supportive financially.

Unlike other European countries, there is a strong focus on local development and increasing the sports' popularity. As a result, the vast majority of the Serbian players are from local communities.

Serbian cricket has pulled off a major victory for development by securing recognition for cricket as a mainstream sport by the government and the media. This provides Serbia cricket with a fund source, as well as creating interest in new markets for the game. Another byproduct of this is that the domestic and national team matches are covered by the major Serbian newspapers.

Serbia was accepted as the 58th Affiliate Member of the International Cricket Council in June 2015.

== Future plans ==
Serbia's plans for 2015 included: Further promotion of the game of cricket in Serbia, expanding player basis and improving training conditions, providing basic playing facilities, organization of the first domestic competitions: cup and championship and organization of the first international match of the Serbia National Team and putting Serbia on the world cricket map.

== See also ==
- Serbian Cricket Federation
