= List of Greece Twenty20 International cricketers =

This is a list of Greek Twenty20 International cricketers. In April 2018, the ICC decided to grant full Twenty20 International (T20I) status to all its members. Therefore, all Twenty20 matches played between Greece and other ICC members after 1 January 2019 will be eligible for T20I status.

This list comprises all members of the Greece cricket team who have played at least one T20I match. It is initially arranged in the order in which each player won his first Twenty20 cap. Where more than one player won his first Twenty20 cap in the same match, those players are listed alphabetically by surname. Greece played their first T20I matches during the 2019 Hellenic Premier League in October 2019.

== Key ==
General

- ‡ – Captain
- † – Wicket-keeper
- First – Year of debut
- Last – Year of latest game
- Mat – Number of matches played

Batting

- Runs – Runs scored in career
- HS – Highest score
- Avg – Runs scored per dismissal
- 50 – Number of half centuries
- * – Batsman remained not out

Bowling

- Balls – Balls bowled in career
- Wkt – Wickets taken in career
- BBI – Best bowling in an innings
- Ave – Average runs per wicket

Fielding

- Ca – Catches taken
- St – Stumpings affected

== List of players ==
Statistics are correct as of 20 August 2026.

Greece T20I cricketers
General					Batting				Bowling				Fielding		Ref
No.	Name	First	Last	Mat	Runs	HS	Avg	50	Balls	Wkt	BBI	Ave	Ca	St	Ref
1	Alexandros Anemogiannis	2019	2019	1	–	–	–	–	–	–	–	–	0	0	
2	Arsalan Ahmed	2019	2021	7	54	22	10.80	0	120	6	3/15	25.50	4	0	
3	Aslam Mohammad‡	2019	2024	14	182	61	16.54	2	175	5	2/22	41.60	4	0	
4	Alexandros Aspiotis	2019	2019	3	3	3*	–	0	66	4	2/24	17.75	0	0	
5	Asrar Ahmed	2019	2021	7	94	38	31.33	0	144	9	2/4	20.00	2	0	
6	Georgios Galanis	2019	2026	18	95	19*	9.50	0	271	18	3/17	16.27	12	0	
7	Spyridon Goustis	2019	2019	3	11	11	11.00	0	54	4	2/28	10.50	0	0	
8	Anastasios Manousis‡†	2019	2022	11	118	27	13.11	0	42	2	1/14	25.50	2	2	
9	Amarpreet Mehmi	2019	2026	19	215	39	13.43	0	188	7	1/9	34.28	10	0	
10	Muhammad Awais†	2019	2019	3	50	42*	50.00	0	–	–	–	–	3	1	
11	Shaffeq Muhammad	2019	2019	2	–	–	–	–	42	2	2/12	10.50	1	0	
12	Spyridon Bantzas	2019	2019	1	–	–	–	–	18	3	3/12	4.00	1	0	
13	Georgios Nikitas†	2019	2019	2	–	–	–	–	–	–	–	–	0	2	
14	Alexandros Lagos	2019	2019	1	1	1*	–	0	12	0	–	–	1	0	
15	Spiridon Gasteratos	2021	2021	4	23	17*	11.50	0	77	5	2/4	19.00	2	0	
16	Nikolaos Mourikis	2021	2021	2	0	0	0.00	0	–	–	–	–	0	0	
17	Spiros Siriotis	2021	2021	4	0	0	0.00	0	–	–	–	–	3	0	
18	Syed Amanullah	2021	2021	4	11	11*	11.00	0	6	1	1/9	9.00	0	0	
19	Thomas Zotos	2021	2022	7	13	6	3.25	0	24	2	2/14	12.50	1	0	
20	Alkinoos Manatos	2021	2021	2	–	–	–	–	–	–	–	–	0	0	
21	Alexandros Karvelas	2022	2022	4	80	35	20.00	0	84	2	1/13	50.00	1	0	
22	Christodoulos Bogdanos	2022	2026	10	140	39*	20.00	0	–	–	–	–	5	0	
23	Spiridon Bogdos†	2022	2022	4	24	19	6.00	0	–	–	–	–	2	1	
24	Gerasimos Fatouros	2022	2022	4	84	50	21.00	1	60	3	2/40	25.00	2	0	
25	Andreas Gasteratos	2022	2024	6	17	8*	4.25	0	–	–	–	–	0	0	
26	Aristides Karvelas	2022	2022	1	10	10	10.00	0	18	0	–	–	0	0	
27	Panagiotis Magafas	2022	2022	4	49	30	16.33	0	–	–	–	–	0	0	
28	Ilias Bardis	2022	2022	2	2	2*	2.00	0	6	1	1/12	12.00	0	0	
29	Ali Abdulla Popalzae	2022	2022	1	0	0	0.00	0	18	3	3/21	7.00	0	0	
30	Ali Muaaz	2024	2024	4	13	10	3.25	0	1	0	–	–	0	0	
31	Nikolaos Katechis†	2024	2024	4	4	3*	4.00	0	–	–	–	–	3	0	
32	Sajid Khan Afridi	2024	2026	8	147	38	18.37	0	90	2	1/14	72.50	3	0	
33	Samader Shadab	2024	2026	7	28	14	4.66	0	84	4	2/36	30.25	2	0	
34	Sinan Khan	2024	2026	8	59	17	7.37	0	84	8	3/36	16.12	0	0	
35	Spyridon Vasilakis	2024	2024	4	12	7*	6.00	0	60	3	2/9	23.66	1	0	
36	Muhammad Tahir	2024	2024	2	3	3	3.00	0	17	1	1/9	21.00	0	0	
37	Emanuel	2026	2026	4	2	1	0.66	0	48	2	1/12	29.50	0	0	
38	Blake Faunce	2026	2026	4	21	11	7.00	0	43	2	2/29	25.00	1	0	
39	Billy Konstas	2026	2026	4	95	50*	47.50	0	36	3	2/7	18.66	1	0	
40	Dimitrios Triantafillithis	2026	2026	3	0	0	0.00	0	8	0	–	–	1	0	
41	Phillipos Nair	2026	2026	1	–	–	–	–	–	–	–	–	0	0	
