= 2021 Valletta Cup =

International cricket tournament

- Dates: 21 – 24 October 2021
- Administrator(s): Malta Cricket Association
- Cricket format: Twenty20 International
- Host(s): Malta
- Champions: Malta
- Runners-up: Switzerland
- Participants: 4
- Matches: 8
- Player of the series: (Gibraltar) Avinash Pai
- Most runs: (Gibraltar) Louis Bruce (222)
- Most wickets: (Switzerland) Ashwin Vinod (9)

The 2021 Valletta Cup was a Twenty20 International (T20I) cricket tournament held in Malta between 21 and 24 October 2021. It was the second edition of the Valletta Cup. The matches were played at the Marsa Sports Club in Marsa. The participating teams were the hosts Malta along with Bulgaria, Gibraltar and Switzerland.

This was the first international tournament for Switzerland since the introduction of global T20I status in January 2019, and their re-admittance to the International Cricket Council (ICC) in July 2021. Cricket Switzerland (previously known as the Swiss Cricket Association), had been suspended by the ICC in 2012 due to non-compliance following the formation of a second organization also claiming to oversee cricket in the country. They were one of three nations to gain Associate membership after the ICC's annual general meeting in July 2021.

Switzerland finished on top of the round-robin stage with three wins. Malta defeated Switzerland in the final, after Bulgaria defeated Gibraltar in the third-place playoff. After the tournament, Malta and Gibraltar played a rain-affected two-match bilateral T20I series that was shared after one game was lost to the weather and the other finished as a DLS method tie.

== Squads ==
Bulgaria	Gibraltar	Malta	Switzerland
Prakash Mishra (c); Hristo Lakov (vc); Atagul Ahmadhel; Jacob Albin; Sulaiman Ali; Rohan Bhavesh Patel; Kevin D'Souza; Aravinda De Silva; Akshay Harikumar; Saim Hussain (wk); Ivaylo Katzarski; Ahsan Khan; Andrey Lilov; Omar Rassol (wk); Bakhtiar Tahiri; Delrick Varghese	Avinash Pai (c); Nikhil Advani; Louis Bruce; Luke Collado (wk); Richard Cunningham; Chris Delany; Kieron Ferrary (wk); James Fitzgerald; Charles Harrison; Patrick Hatchman; Joseph Marples (wk); Kenroy Nestor; Morgan Peters; Philip Raikes; Andrew Reyes; Dave Robeson; Joe Wilson	Bikram Arora (c); Amar Sharma (vc); Waseem Abbas; Samuel Aquilina (wk); Gopal Chaturvedi; Basil George; Heinrich Gericke; Aaftab Alam Khan (wk); Zeeshan Khan; Niraj Khanna; Kalki Kumar; Zoheb Malek; Bilal Muhammad; Fazil Rahman; Samuel Stanislaus; Varun Thamotharam; Jojo Thomas; Deon Vosloo	Anser Mehmood (c); Nicolas Henderson (wk); Noorkhan Ahmedi; Aidan Andrews; Stefan Franklin; Aneesh Kumar; Asvin Lakkaraju; Asad Mahmood; Osama Mahmood; Matthew Martin; Ali Nayyer; Idrees Ul Haque; Arjun Vinod; Ashwin Vinod

== Valletta Cup ==
=== Points table ===
Team	P	W	L	T	NR	Pts	NRR
Switzerland	3	3	0	0	0	6	+3.067
Malta	3	2	1	0	0	4	+1.379
Gibraltar	3	1	2	0	0	2	–1.274
Bulgaria	3	0	3	0	0	0	–3.662

=== Fixtures ===
21 October 2021
14:00
Scorecard

Malta; 213/5 (20 overs)	v	Gibraltar; 152/2 (20 overs)
Heinrich Gericke 64 (25); Avinash Pai 2/28 (4 overs)		Louis Bruce 57* (55); Bilal Muhammad 1/24 (4 overs)

Malta won by 61 runs
Marsa Sports Club, Marsa
Umpires: Andrew Naudi (Mlt) and Tim Wheeler (Mlt)
Player of the match: Heinrich Gericke (Mlt)

- Malta won the toss and elected to bat.
- Aaftab Alam Khan, Kalki Kumar (Mlt), Philip Raikes and Andrew Reyes (Gib) all made their T20I debuts.

22 October 2021
10:00
Scorecard

Gibraltar; 133/9 (20 overs)	v	Switzerland; 134/1 (14.4 overs)
Louis Bruce 31 (27); Aidan Andrews 3/21 (4 overs)		Osama Mahmood 58* (46); Charles Harrison 1/19 (2 overs)

Switzerland won by 9 wickets
Marsa Sports Club, Marsa
Umpires: Tony Slater (Mlt) and Tim Wheeler (Mlt)
Player of the match: Osama Mahmood (Sui)

- Gibraltar won the toss and elected to bat.
- Noorkhan Ahmedi, Aidan Andrews, Stefan Franklin, Nicolas Henderson, Asad Mahmood, Osama Mahmood, Anser Mehmood, Ali Nayyer, Idrees Ul Haque, Arjun Vinod and Ashwin Vinod (Sui) all made their T20I debuts.

22 October 2021
14:00
Scorecard

Bulgaria; 81 (19.3 overs)	v	Switzerland; 82/2 (6 overs)
Jacob Albin 19* (30); Aneesh Kumar 3/3 (2.3 overs)		Arjun Vinod 43* (20); Delrick Varghese 1/21 (1 over)

Switzerland won by 8 wickets
Marsa Sports Club, Marsa
Umpires: Ghose Roy (Mlt) and Tony Slater (Mlt)
Player of the match: Aneesh Kumar (Sui)

- Bulgaria won the toss and elected to bat.
- Ahsan Khan, Andrey Lilov (Bul) and Aneesh Kumar (Sui) all made their T20I debuts.

23 October 2021
08:30
Scorecard

Gibraltar; 217/4 (20 overs)	v	Bulgaria; 180/5 (20 overs)
Avinash Pai 107* (52); Sulaiman Ali 2/38 (4 overs)		Hristo Lakov 80 (63); James Fitzgerald 2/37 (4 overs)

Gibraltar won by 37 runs
Marsa Sports Club, Marsa
Umpires: Ashok Bishnoi (Mlt) and John Grima (Mlt)
Player of the match: Avinash Pai (Gib)

- Bulgaria won the toss and elected to field.
- Dave Robeson (Gib) made his T20I debut.
- Avinash Pai became the first player for Gibraltar to score a century in T20Is.

23 October 2021
11:45
Scorecard

Switzerland; 150/9 (20 overs)	v	Malta; 142/9 (20 overs)
Asad Mahmood 33 (25); Bikram Arora 3/20 (4 overs)		Bilal Muhammad 35* (17); Ashwin Vinod 3/30 (4 overs)

Switzerland won by 8 runs
Marsa Sports Club, Marsa
Umpires: John Grima (Mlt) and Ghose Roy (Mlt)
Player of the match: Osama Mahmood (Sui)

- Switzerland won the toss and elected to bat.
- Matthew Martin (Sui) made his T20I debut.

23 October 2021
15:00
Scorecard

Bulgaria; 150/6 (20 overs)	v	Malta; 153/4 (17 overs)
Omar Rassol 63* (36); Varun Thamotharam 2/30 (4 overs)		Basil George 41 (27); Sulaiman Ali 2/26 (3 overs)

Malta won by 6 wickets
Marsa Sports Club, Marsa
Umpires: Jitesh Patel (Mlt) and Ghose Roy (Mlt)
Player of the match: Heinrich Gericke (Mlt)

- Bulgaria won the toss and elected to bat.
- Zoheb Malek and Deon Vosloo (Mlt) both made their T20I debuts.

=== Third-place play-off ===
24 October 2021
10:00
Scorecard

Gibraltar; 177/9 (20 overs)	v	Bulgaria; 178/4 (20 overs)
Avinash Pai 71 (37); Prakash Mishra 3/22 (4 overs)		Aravinda De Silva 62 (40); Charles Harrison 2/31 (4 overs)

Bulgaria won by 6 wickets
Marsa Sports Club, Marsa
Umpires: Jitesh Patel (Mlt) and Ghose Roy (Mlt)
Player of the match: Hristo Lakov (Bul)

- Gibraltar won the toss and elected to bat.

=== Final ===
24 October 2021
14:00
Scorecard

Malta; 176/7 (20 overs)	v	Switzerland; 170/8 (20 overs)
Bikram Arora 42 (39); Aneesh Kumar 2/26 (4 overs)		Idrees Ul Haque 42 (23); Varun Thamotharam 3/25 (4 overs)

Malta won by 6 runs
Marsa Sports Club, Marsa
Umpires: John Grima (Mlt) and Jitesh Patel (Mlt)
Player of the match: Varun Thamotharam (Mlt)

- Malta won the toss and elected to bat.

== Bilateral series ==
Gibraltarian cricket team in Malta in 2021–22
	Malta	Gibraltar
- Date: 25 October 2021
Captains	Bikram Arora	Avinash Pai

Twenty20 International series
- Results: 2-match series drawn 0–0
Most runs	Varun Thamotharam (50)	Kieron Ferrary (35)
Most wickets	Waseem Abbas (1); Bilal Muhammad (1)	Louis Bruce (4)

=== 1st T20I ===
25 October 2021
10:00
Scorecard

Malta	v	Gibraltar

Match abandoned
Marsa Sports Club, Marsa
Umpires: Andrew Naudi (Mlt) and Les White (Mlt)

- No toss.
- No play was possible due to rain.

=== 2nd T20I ===
25 October 2021
14:00
Scorecard

Malta; 145 (19 overs)	v	Gibraltar; 57/2 (7.2 overs)
Varun Thamotharam 50 (27); Louis Bruce 4/13 (3 overs)		Kieron Ferrary 35* (25); Waseem Abbas 1/15 (2 overs)

Match tied (DLS method)
Marsa Sports Club, Marsa
Umpires: Andrew Naudi (Mlt) and Les White (Mlt)
Player of the match: Louis Bruce (Gib)

- Gibraltar won the toss and elected to field.
- No further play was possible due to rain. Gibraltar had been set a revised target of 98 runs from 12 overs.
- Jojo Thomas (Mlt) and Kieron Ferrary (Gib) both made their T20I debuts.
