= List of Serbia Twenty20 International cricketers =

This is a list of Serbian Twenty20 International cricketers. In April 2018, the ICC decided to grant full Twenty20 International (T20I) status to all its members. Therefore, all Twenty20 matches played between Serbia and other ICC members after 1 January 2019 have T20I status.

This list comprises names of all members of the Serbia cricket team who have played at least one T20I match. It is initially arranged in the order in which each player won his first Twenty20 cap. Where more than one player won his first Twenty20 cap in the same match, those players are listed alphabetically by surname. Serbia played their first T20I matches during the 2019 Hellenic Premier League in October 2019.

== Key ==
General

- ‡ – Captain
- † – Wicket-keeper
- First – Year of debut
- Last – Year of latest game
- Mat – Number of matches played

Batting

- Runs – Runs scored in career
- HS – Highest score
- Avg – Runs scored per dismissal
- 50 – Number of half centuries
- 100 – Centuries scored
- * – Batsman remained not out

Bowling

- Balls – Balls bowled in career
- Wkt – Wickets taken in career
- BBI – Best bowling in an innings
- Ave – Average runs per wicket

Fielding

- Ca – Catches taken
- St – Stumpings affected

== List of players ==
Statistics are correct as of 14 July 2026.

Serbia T20I cricketers
General					Batting					Bowling				Fielding		Ref
No.	Name	First	Last	Mat	Runs	HS	Avg	50	100	Balls	Wkt	BBI	Ave	Ca	St	Ref
1	Apon Mustafizur	2019	2021	4	11	11	2.75	0	0	18	2	2/30	15.00	0	0	
2	Bilal Ahmed	2019	2019	1	19	19	19.00	0	0	–	–	–	–	0	0	
3	Haris Dajc‡	2019	2019	2	2	2*	2.00	0	0	24	1	1/36	36.00	0	0	
4	Aleksa Djorovic‡	2019	2023	11	38	15	9.50	0	0	129	1	1/31	215.00	2	0	
5	Bogdan Dugic	2019	2026	22	17	8*	3.40	0	0	249	13	5/28	32.92	4	0	
6	Leslie Dunbar†	2019	2026	49	1,275	117	33.55	6	2	6	0	–	–	19	0	
7	Stefan Nerandzic	2019	2022	3	10	5	5.00	0	0	12	0	–	–	0	0	
8	Rahman Ademi	2019	2024	9	13	11*	4.33	0	0	66	1	1/21	96.00	0	0	
9	Jovan Reb	2019	2023	8	63	19	7.87	0	0	54	1	1/40	106.00	0	0	
10	Sakib Hasan	2019	2019	2	9	8	4.50	0	0	6	0	–	–	0	0	
11	Matija Sarenac	2019	2025	34	25	10	2.77	0	0	496	23	3/18	30.26	3	0	
12	Ivan Civric	2019	2019	1	0	0	0.00	0	0	–	–	–	–	0	0	
13	Wintley Burton†	2021	2026	41	602	84*	18.24	2	0	305	20	3/25	21.60	16	1	
14	Brett Davidson†	2021	2021	4	27	18	6.75	0	0	–	–	–	–	1	0	
15	Michael Dorgan	2021	2021	3	7	4	7.00	0	0	30	2	1/13	40.50	0	0	
16	Nicholas Johns-Wickberg	2021	2023	19	72	24	10.28	0	0	345	19	3/6	20.68	2	0	
17	Slobodan Tosic	2021	2026	31	213	40	16.38	0	0	204	11	2/10	29.18	5	0	
18	Nemanja Zimonjic	2021	2026	36	144	19	6.85	0	0	227	11	3/18	39.27	2	0	
19	Vukasin Zimonjic	2021	2026	48	333	34	12.80	0	0	965	42	3/26	30.26	15	0	
20	Matthew Kostic	2022	2026	18	174	32	13.38	0	0	71	3	1/23	50.33	4	0	
21	Ayo Mene-Ejegi	2022	2024	13	107	32*	11.88	0	0	226	11	4/30	23.72	5	0	
22	Robin Vitas‡	2022	2022	9	82	37*	41.00	0	0	–	–	–	–	0	0	
23	Alexander Dizija	2022	2026	45	881	92	20.48	6	0	61	2	1/17	64.00	7	0	
24	Alister Gajic‡	2022	2025	25	23	9	7.66	0	0	421	24	4/12	24.50	7	0	
25	Simo Ivetic	2022	2024	14	417	65*	41.70	3	0	6	0	–	–	12	0	
26	Mark Pavlovic‡	2022	2026	33	169	36*	9.38	0	0	624	40	4/13	18.10	13	0	
27	Sachin Shinde	2022	2026	4	19	7*	19.00	0	0	36	2	1/11	47.50	0	0	
28	Peter Nedeljkovic	2023	2026	14	34	14*	8.50	0	0	306	17	5/20	21.58	3	0	
29	Djordje Tresac	2023	2023	1	–	–	–	–	–	–	–	–	–	0	0	
30	Braithyn Pecic†	2024	2026	27	521	102	21.70	2	1	24	0	–	–	25	0	
31	Edward Van Reenen	2024	2024	3	7	5	3.50	0	0	–	–	–	–	0	0	
32	Luka Woods	2024	2026	21	919	112	48.36	6	2	371	12	2/13	34.66	18	0	
33	Rhys Hartley†	2024	2025	4	9	5*	9.00	0	0	–	–	–	–	0	0	
34	Harjas Bedi	2025	2025	2	5	5	5.00	0	0	18	0	–	–	0	0	
35	Aleksa Lazic	2025	2026	11	6	4	3.00	0	0	31	0	–	–	6	0	
36	Stevan Savkovic	2025	2025	2	7	5	3.50	0	0	–	–	–	–	1	0	
37	Milan Janicijevic	2026	2026	8	3	2*	1.00	0	0	116	6	2/62	38.50	0	0	

Note: The following match includes a missing catcher in the Cricinfo scorecard and hence statistics (as of 4 November 2019):

- vs. Bulgaria (14 October 2019); 1 missing catcher
