= Marina Ground =

Cricket ground

Marina Cricket Ground
- Interactive map of Marina Cricket Ground

Ground information
- Location: Kontokali, Corfu, Greece
- Country: Greece
- Coordinates: 39°38′50″N 19°51′25″E

International information
- First men's T20I: 14 October 2019: Bulgaria v Serbia
- Last men's T20I: 18 October 2019: Greece v Bulgaria
- First women's T20I: 5 September 2023: Luxembourg v Serbia
- Last women's T20I: 11 May 2025: Greece v Germany
- As of 24 July 2025; Source: ESPNcricinfo

The Marina Ground is a sports ground in Kontokali on the island of Corfu, Greece. In October 2019, it was selected to host the 2019 Hellenic Premier League, which was a men's Twenty20 International (T20I) tri-series between Greece, Serbia and Bulgaria.

In May 2025, the ground hosted four women's Twenty20 International (T20I) matches between Greece and Germany.

== Men's Twenty 20 International centuries ==
The following table summarises the men's Twenty20 International centuries scored at the venue.

No.	Score	Player	Team	Balls	Innings	Opposing team	Date	Result	Ref.
1	104*	Leslie Dunbar	Serbia	61	1	Bulgaria	14 October 2019	Lost	

== See also ==
- Greece national cricket team
