= Ari Karvelas =

South African cricketer (born 1994)

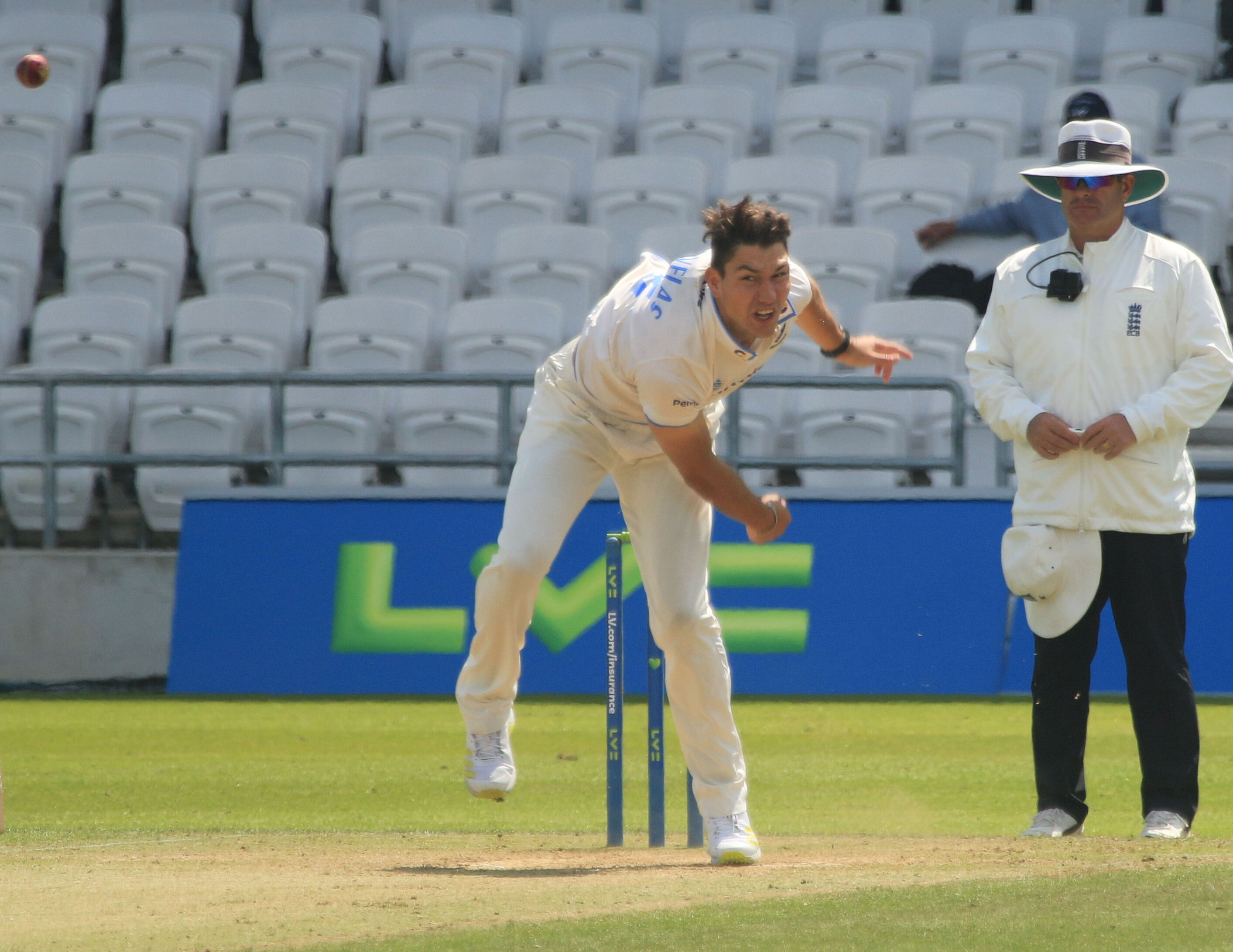
- Karvelas in 2023

Personal information
- Full name: Aristides Karvelas
- Born: 20 March 1994 (age 32); Alberton, Transvaal, South Africa
- Batting: Right-handed
- Bowling: Right-arm medium-fast
- Role: Bowler

International information
- National side: Greece
- Only T20I (cap 26): 12 July 2022 v Italy

Domestic team information
- Years: Team
- 2018/19–2020/21: Gauteng
- 2022–2026: Sussex (squad no. 36)
- 2025: → Surrey (on loan)

Career statistics
Competition	T20I	FC	LA	T20
Matches	1	35	34	9
Runs scored	10	625	189	23
Batting average	10.00	14.88	12.60	7.66
100s/50s	0/0	0/2	0/0	0/0
Top score	10	57	33	10
Balls bowled	18	5,179	1,587	155
Wickets	0	103	54	10
Bowling average	–	26.14	25.22	24.10
5 wickets in innings	–	3	1	0
10 wickets in match	–	0	0	0
Best bowling	–	6/71	5/16	4/20
Catches/stumpings	0/–	9/–	6/–	2/–
- Source: Cricinfo, 26 September 2026

Aristides Karvelas (born 20 March 1994) is a South African cricketer. He made his List A debut for Gauteng in the 2018–19 CSA Provincial One-Day Challenge on 28 October 2018. He made his first-class debut for Gauteng in the 2018–19 CSA 3-Day Provincial Cup on 8 November 2018.

In June 2022, he was named in Greece's Twenty20 International (T20I) squad for the Qualifier A tournament in Finland that formed part of the 2022–23 ICC Men's T20 World Cup Europe Qualifier. He made his T20I debut on 12 July 2022, for Greece against Italy. Later the same month, he was named in Sussex's squad that played in the 2022 County Championship match against Middlesex in England. In May 2023, Karvelas signed a two-year contract extension with the club.

Karvelas moved onto the coaching staff at Sussex when his playing contract expired at the end of the 2025 season, before rejoining the squad on a short-term deal for the final six matches of the county season in August 2026.
