= Gibraltar national cricket team =

Coordinates: 36°6′38.48″N 5°20′48.6″W

Gibraltar
- Association: Gibraltar Cricket Association

Personnel
- Captain: Avinash Pai

International Cricket Council
- ICC status: Associate member (1969)
- ICC region: Europe
ICC Rankings	Current	Best-ever
T20I	78th	68th (2-May-2022)

International cricket
- First international: Gibraltar v. Kenya (Solihull, England; 16 June 1982)

One Day Internationals
- World Cup Qualifier appearances: 6 (first in 1982)
- Best result: First round (1982–2001)

T20 Internationals
- First T20I: v Portugal at La Manga Club, Cartagena; 26 October 2019
- Last T20I: v Norway at Koge Cricket Club, Køge; 14 July 2026
T20Is	Played	Won/Lost
Total	61	17/42 (2 ties, 0 no results)
This year	10	1/8 (1 tie, 0 no results)
T20I kit
- As of 14 July 2026

The Gibraltar national cricket team represents the British overseas territory of Gibraltar in international cricket. They have been an associate member of the International Cricket Council (ICC) since 1969.

Gibraltar played in the ICC Trophy (now replaced by the ICC World Cup Qualifier) from 1982 to 2001, with little success. The team has played in the top-flight of the European Cricket Championship on four occasions, and placed sixth (out of eight teams) at the 1996 European Cricket Championship held in Denmark in 1996. After the creation of the World Cricket League, Gibraltar was placed in the 2009 Division Seven. It was subsequently relegated to 2010 Division Eight, where another low finish saw the team again relegated, to regional qualifying tournaments.

With approximately 34,000 residents, Gibraltar has one of the smallest populations of any ICC member. Only three members, all fellow dependencies of ICC full members, have a smaller population – in order from largest to smallest, the Cook Islands, Saint Helena, and Falkland Islands.

== History ==
=== Early years ===
Cricket has been played in Gibraltar by British servicemen since the late 18th century. A cricket ground is known to have existed north of the Rock of Gibraltar in 1800. Civilians as well as servicemen were playing the game by 1822. The Gibraltar Cricket Club was formed in 1883, and formed the backbone of civilian cricket until well into the 20th century.

In 1890, a ship carrying the Australia national cricket team on the way to a tour of England, docked in Gibraltar Harbour after a collision with two other ships. The Australians played a game against a Gibraltar Garrison team. The Australians won the game, scoring 150/8, as the local side were dismissed for just 25.

The game was flourishing in the 1930s, with Gibraltar producing many locally born players. However, the Second World War meant a cut back in the game, with many cricket fields giving way to the military, one even being converted into an airfield.

=== Post-war years ===
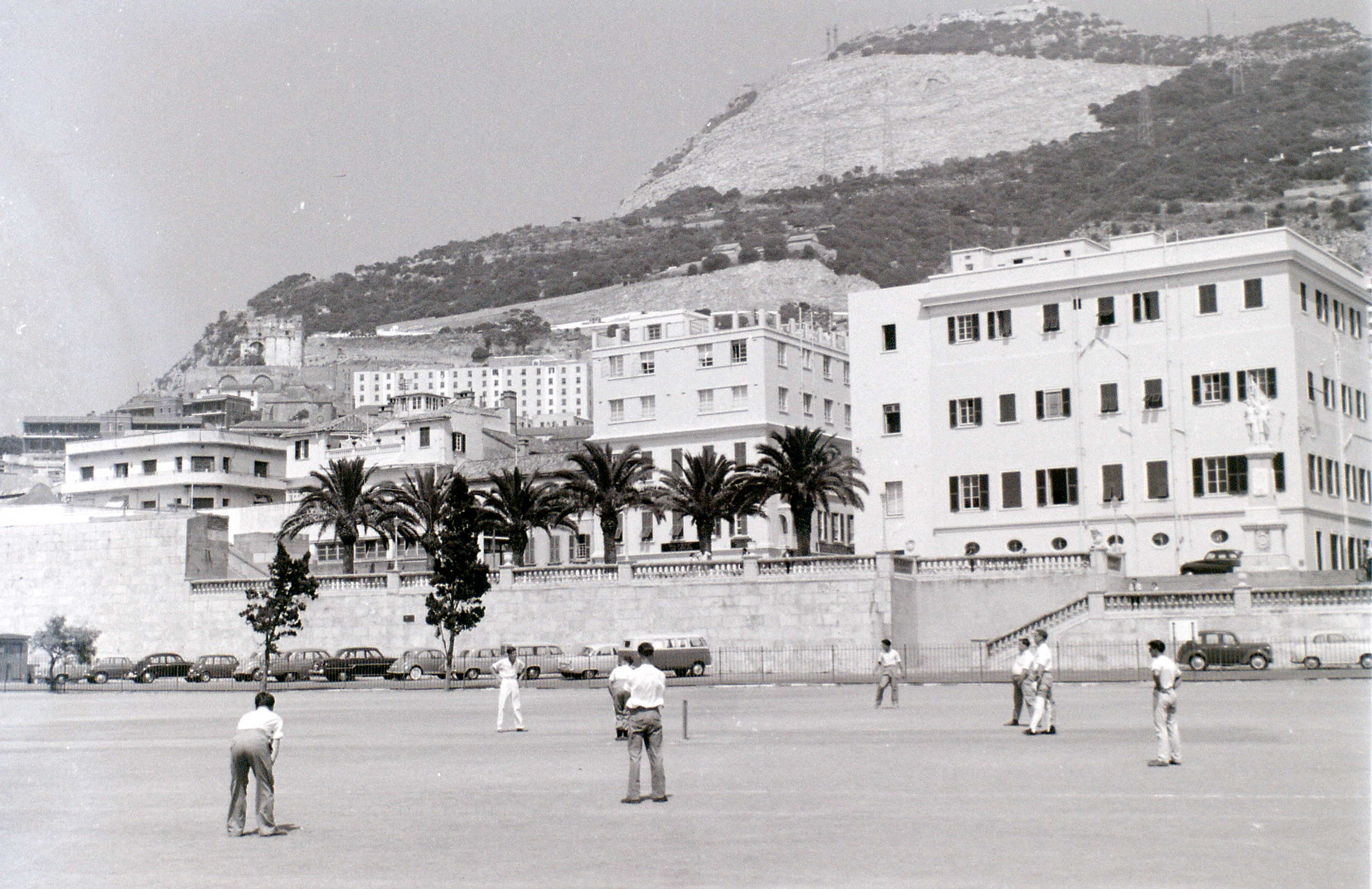
Cricket being played in Gibraltar in 1960

The 1950s saw an increase in clubs, and the Gibraltar Cricket Association was formed in 1960. They were elected to associate membership of the ICC in 1969. Essex County Cricket Club visited after the conclusion of the 1973 English domestic season, and played a Rock XI in a one-day game, winning by 178 runs. Visits by English sides of various ability levels have continued ever since.

In 1982, Gibraltar took part in the second ICC Trophy, without winning a match. They improved on this performance in the 1986 tournament, gaining their first international win against Israel. They performed even better in the next tournament, beating East and Central Africa, Singapore and Israel, reaching the plate competition. Israel toured Gibraltar in 1992, winning the match they played against the national side.

Gibraltar finished in 20th place in the 1994 ICC Trophy, and played in the first European Championship in Copenhagen in 1996, finishing sixth after losing to Scotland in a play-off. They finished 19th in the following years ICC Trophy and played poorly in the 1998 European Championship, finishing last in the ten team tournament.

In 1999, Gibraltar hosted a quadrangular tournament also involving France, Israel and Italy, losing in the final to Italy. The European Championship was split into two divisions in 2000, with Gibraltar placed in Division Two, which they won. The following year they travelled to Canada to take part in the 2001 ICC Trophy. A withdrawal by Italy and the non-arrival of West Africa left Gibraltar with just three matches to play against Germany, Namibia and Nepal, losing all of them and not progressing beyond the first round.

Gibraltar defended their European Division Two title in 2002, but could not continue this success in 2004, finishing fifth out of six teams. They did not qualify for the 2005 ICC Trophy, and finished fourth in Division Two of the European Championship in 2006 after losing a play-off to Germany.

Gibraltar placed sixth at the 2009 Global Division Seven tournament and was relegated to Division-eight.

=== 2018-Present ===
In April 2018, the ICC decided to grant full Twenty20 International (T20I) status to all its members. Therefore, all Twenty20 matches played between Gibraltar and other ICC members after 1 January 2019 have the full T20I status.

Gibraltar played their first T20I on 26 October 2019, against Portugal, during the 2019 Iberia Cup.

26 October 2019
08:45
Scorecard

Gibraltar; 113/6 (20 overs)	v	Portugal; 116/4 (18.3 overs)
Avinash Pai 52 (52); Paolo Buccimazza 2/18 (4 overs)		Zohaib Sarwar 33* (21); Avinash Pai 2/18 (4 overs)

Portugal won by 6 wickets
La Manga Club Bottom Ground, Cartagena
Umpires: Gordon Ashford (Esp) and Adnan Khan (Esp)

- Gibraltar won the toss and elected to bat.

Gibraltar achieved a first T20I victory during the 2021 Valletta Cup in a match against Bulgaria. This win came on the back of a century from captain Avinash Pai accompanied by a half century from 16 year old Louis Bruce.

23 October 2021
Scorecard

Gibraltar; 217/4 (20 overs)	v	Bulgaria; 180/5 (20 overs)
Avinash Pai 107* (52); Sulaiman Ali 2/38 (4 overs)		Hristo Lakov 80 (63); James Fitzgerald 2/37 (4 overs)

Gibraltar won by 37 runs
Marsa Sports Club, Malta
Player of the match: Avinash Pai

- Bulgaria won the toss and elected to field.
- * Balaji Pai scored Gibraltar's first T20I century.

== Records and statistics ==
International Match Summary — Gibraltar

Last updated 14 July 2026

Playing Record
Format	M	W	L	T	NR	Inaugural Match
Twenty20 Internationals	61	17	42	2	0	26 October 2019

=== Twenty20 International ===
- Highest team total: 243/7 v. Bulgaria 11 July 2025 at Vasil Levski National Sports Academy, Sofia.
- Highest individual score: 107*, Avinash Pai v. Bulgaria on 23 October 2021 at Marsa Sports Club, Marsa.
- Best individual bowling figures: 5/16, Samarth Bodha v. Romania on 25 May 2024 at Moara Vlasiei Cricket Ground, Ilfov County.

T20I record versus other nations

Records complete to T20I #4034. Last updated 14 July 2026.

Opponent	M	W	L	T	NR	First match	First win
vs Associate Members
Belgium	2	0	2	0	0	28 June 2022	
Bulgaria	8	4	4	0	0	23 October 2021	23 October 2021
Czech Republic	1	0	1	0	0	11 May 2022	
Denmark	1	0	1	0	0	29 June 2022	
Estonia	2	1	1	0	0	30 September 2023	30 September 2023
Germany	1	0	1	0	0	8 July 2024	
Hungary	2	1	1	0	0	10 May 2022	1 July 2022
Luxembourg	2	1	1	0	0	15 October 2023	15 October 2023
Malta	15	2	11	2	0	21 August 2021	5 May 2023
Norway	2	0	2	0	0	13 July 2024	
Portugal	10	0	10	0	0	26 October 2019	
Romania	3	1	2	0	0	15 May 2022	25 May 2024
Serbia	5	5	0	0	0	5 October 2023	5 October 2023
Slovenia	1	0	1	0	0	10 July 2024	
Spain	2	0	2	0	0	26 October 2019	
Sweden	1	0	1	0	0	11 July 2024	
Switzerland	1	0	1	0	0	22 October 2021	
Turkey	2	2	0	0	0	11 July 2025	11 July 2025

== Other records ==
=== ICC Trophy ===
- Highest team total: 270/5 v Israel, 18 June 1990 at Sportpark Laag Zestienhoven, Rotterdam
- Highest individual score: 98, Tim Buzaglo v Singapore, 25 February 1994 at Ruaraka Sports Club Ground, Nairobi
- Best individual bowling figures: 5/14, Nigel Churaman v Israel, 30 March 1997 at Rubber Research Institute Ground, Kuala Lumpur

ICC Trophy record versus other nations

Opponent	M	W	L	T	NR	First match	First win
Argentina	1	1	1	0	0	1 April 1997	1 April 1997
Bermuda	2	0	2	0	0	23 June 1986	
Canada	1	0	1	0	0	20 June 1986	
Denmark	1	0	1	0	0	8 June 1990	
East and Central Africa	2	1	1	0	0	10 June 1990	10 June 1990
Fiji	1	0	1	0	0	16 June 1986	
Germany	1	0	1	0	0	2 July 2001	
Hong Kong	2	0	2	0	0	28 June 1982	
Ireland	2	0	2	0	0	16 February 1994	
Israel	4	3	1	0	1	25 June 1982	30 June 1986
Kenya	2	0	2	0	0	16 June 1982	
Malaysia	1	0	1	0	0	18 February 1994	
Namibia	1	0	1	0	0	4 July 2001	
Nepal	1	0	1	0	0	1 July 2001	
Netherlands	2	0	2	0	0	27 June 1986	
Papua New Guinea	3	0	3	0	0	2 July 1982	
Singapore	3	1	2	0	0	16 June 1990	16 June 1990
United States	4	0	3	0	1	18 June 1982	
West Africa	2	0	1	0	1	23 February 1994	

=== One-Day ===
Below is a record of international matches played in ICC Trophy, European Cricket Championship and World Cricket League events by Gibraltar between 1982 and 2013.

Opponent	M	W	L	T	NR
Argentina	1	1	0	0	0
Austria	2	2	0	0	0
Bahamas	1	0	1	0	0
Bahrain	2	0	1	0	1
Belgium	1	0	1	0	0
Bermuda	2	0	2	0	0
Bhutan	1	0	1	0	0
Canada	1	0	1	0	0
Croatia	1	0	1	0	0
Denmark	2	0	2	0	0
East and Central Africa	2	1	1	0	0
Fiji	1	0	1	0	0
France	7	4	3	0	0
Germany	10	4	6	0	0
Greece	2	1	1	0	0
Guernsey	4	0	4	0	0
Hong Kong	2	0	2	0	0
Ireland	3	0	3	0	0
Israel	10	6	3	0	1
Italy	3	1	2	0	0
Japan	1	0	1	0	0
Jersey	1	0	1	0	0
Kenya	2	0	2	0	0
Malaysia	1	0	1	0	0
Namibia	1	0	1	0	0
Nepal	1	0	1	0	0
Netherlands	2	0	2	0	0
Nigeria	1	0	1	0	0
Norway	3	0	3	0	0
Papua New Guinea	3	0	3	0	0
Portugal	2	1	1	0	0
Scotland	1	0	1	0	0
Singapore	3	1	2	0	0
Suriname	3	1	2	0	0
United States	4	1	3	0	0
West Africa	2	0	1	0	1
Zambia	1	0	1	0	0
Total	90	24	63	0	3

== Tournament history ==
=== World Cricket League Qualifier ===
- 2012: 3rd place (La Manga)

=== World Cricket League ===
- 2009: 6th place (Division Seven)
- 2010: 6th place (Division Eight)

=== ICC Trophy ===
- 1979: Did not participate
- 1982: First round
- 1986: First round
- 1990: Plate competition
- 1994: 20th place
- 1997: 19th place
- 2001: First round
- 2005: Did not qualify

=== European Championship ===
- 1996: 6th place
- 1998: 10th place
- 2000: Division Two winners
- 2002: Division Two winners
- 2004: 5th place (Division Two)
- 2006: 4th place (Division Two)
- 2008: 3rd place (Division Two)
- 2010: 6th place (Division Two)
- 2011: 9th place (Division One)
- 2014: 4th place (Division Two)

=== T20I Tournaments ===
- 2008 Iberia Cup: runner-up.
- 2019 Iberia Cup: 3rd place.
- 2021 Portugal Tri-Nation Series: 3rd place.
- 2021 Valletta Cup: 4th place.

== Current squad ==
This lists all the players who have played for Gibraltar in the past 12 months or has been part of the latest T20I squad. Updated as of 7 May 2023.

Name	Age	Batting style	Bowling style	Notes
Batter
Iain Latin	42	Right-handed	Right-arm leg break	Captain
All-rounders
Louis Bruce	21	Right-handed	Right-arm fast	
Avinash Pai	44	Right-handed	Right-arm off break	Vice-captain
James Fitzgerald	27	Right-handed	Right-arm medium-fast	
Andrew Reyes	42	Right-handed	Right-arm medium	
Kennedy Nestor	38	Right-handed	Right-arm fast	
Kieron Ferrary	37	Right-handed	Right-arm off break	
Wicketkeepers
Kayron Stagno	33	Right-handed		
Chris Pyle	25	Right-handed		
Spin Bowlers
Kabir Mirpuri	38	Right-handed	Right-arm off break	
Nikhil Advani	39	Right-handed	Right-arm off break	
Pace Bowlers
Samarth Bodha	23	Right-handed	Right-arm medium	
Jack Horrocks	33	Right-handed	Left-arm medium	
Alex Sawyer	18	Right-handed	Right-arm medium	

== See also ==
- List of Gibraltar Twenty20 International cricketers
