= Tim Dellor =

Timothy Paul Dellor is a radio presenter on BBC Berkshire.

== Biography ==
Dellor is also a sports commentator and reporter with the BBC.

He was involved in an altercation with Reading F.C. manager Brendan Rodgers in December 2009, shortly before Rodgers' departure from the club following a poor run of results.

== Personal life ==
Dellor's wife, Amanda Sutton, is a BBC Berkshire broadcast journalist, who often wrote sports reports on Reading Hockey Club. They had worked closely together in November 2004 covering the Ufton Nervet rail crash.

Dellor is a Level 4 ECB-qualified coach and has worked in the elite coach performance department of the England National Academy at Loughborough. He was head coach of the Greece national cricket team for nine years, winning the ECC Trophy in 1999.
