= Gibraltar Cricket Association =

Cricket governing body

Gibraltar Cricket Board GCA
- Formation: May 1960
- Headquarters: 1st Floor, GFSB, Irish Town, Gibraltar
- Members: International Cricket Council
- President: Christian Rocca
- Website: Gib Cricket official site

Gibraltar Cricket Board is the official national governing body of the sport of cricket in Gibraltar. Its current headquarters is in Irish Town. It is Gibraltar's representative at the International Cricket Council (ICC), where it has been an Associate Member since 1969. It is also a member of ICC Europe.

== History ==
In April 2018, the ICC decided to grant full Twenty20 International (T20I) status to all its members. Therefore, all Twenty20 matches played between Gibraltar and other ICC members after 1 January 2019 were considered full T20Is.

Gibraltar played their first T20I on 26 October 2019, against Spain, during the 2019 Iberia Cup.

== See also ==
- Gibraltar national cricket team
- Sport in Gibraltar
