= Bulgaria women's national cricket team =

Cricket team

Bulgaria
- Flag of Bulgaria
- Association: Bulgarian Cricket Federation

International Cricket Council
- ICC status: Associate member (2017); Affiliate member (2008)
- ICC region: Europe
ICC Rankings	Current	Best-ever
T20I	71st	71st (1 January 2026)

T20 Internationals
- First T20I: v. Serbia at Lisicji Jarak Cricket Ground, Belgrade; 12 October 2024
- Last T20I: v. Romania at Moara Vlasei Cricket Ground, Ilfov County; 18 October 2026
T20Is	Played	Won/Lost
Total	31	3/28 (0 ties, 0 no results)
This year	12	3/9 (0 ties, 0 no results)
- As of 18 October 2026

The Bulgaria women's national cricket team represents the country of Bulgaria in international women's cricket. The team is organised by the Bulgarian Cricket Federation, which became an affiliate member of the International Cricket Council (ICC) in 2008.

In April 2018, the ICC granted full Women's Twenty20 International (WT20I) status to all its members. Therefore, all Twenty20 matches played between Bulgaria women and other ICC members after 1 July 2018 will be a full WT20I.

== History ==
The game of cricket was introduced into Bulgaria in the early 20th century by English diplomats and was played in the American college in the centre of Southwest Bulgaria – Blagoevgrad. The new history of Bulgarian cricket began in 2002 with the official foundation of the Bulgarian Cricket Federation, which was as a result of the efforts of a few enthusiastic sportsmen, captivated by the game. At the same meeting members appointed prof. Nikolay Kolev as a president of the federation. Based at Bulgaria's National Sports Agency in the capital city of Sofia, the BCF has ten member clubs with juniors, seniors and universities male and female teams, which compete in an annual league and other national and regional tournaments.

Bulgaria women played their first T20I match when they toured Serbia during October 2024.

== Records and statistics ==
International Match Summary — Bulgaria Women

Last updated 18 October 2026

Playing Record
Format	M	W	L	T	NR	Inaugural Match
Twenty20 Internationals	31	3	28	0	0	12 October 2024

=== Twenty20 International ===
T20I record versus other nations

Records complete to WT20I #3041. Last updated 18 October 2026.

Opponent	M	W	L	T	NR	First match	First win
Austria	2	0	2	0	0	11 October 2025	
Croatia	2	0	2	0	0	4 September 2026	
Estonia	3	0	3	0	0	15 May 2025	
Greece	5	0	5	0	0	26 October 2024	
Norway	1	0	1	0	0	12 October 2025	
Romania	3	2	1	0	0	10 October 2025	16 October 2026
Serbia	12	1	11	0	0	12 October 2024	27 June 2026
Sweden	1	0	1	0	0	15 October 2026	
Turkey	2	0	2	0	0	8 July 2025	

== See also ==
- List of Bulgaria women Twenty20 International cricketers
- Bulgaria national cricket team
