= Serbian Cricket Federation =

- Sport: Cricket
- Founded: June 2015
- Affiliation: International Cricket Council
- Affiliation date: June 2015
- Regional affiliation: ICC Europe
- Location: Belgrade, Serbia
- Chairman: Haris Dajč
- Secretary: Vladimir Ninković
- Coach: Peter Cheeseman

Official website
- www.serbiacricket.com
- (Serbia)

Serbian Cricket Federation, also known as Kriket federacija Srbije, is the official governing body of the sport of cricket in Serbia. Its current headquarters is in Belgrade, Serbia. Serbian Cricket Federation is the Serbian representative at the International Cricket Council and is an affiliate member and has been a member of that body since June 2015. It is also a member of the ICC Europe. Since 2017, they are an associate member.

== History ==
Two clubs Stari Grad and Mirijevo were founded in Belgrade in 2007. This is when cricket finally found its place in Serbia. From October 2007, key persons Haris Dajč, Vladimir Ninković, Darko Ivić, Nenad Dugić and Amberish Sarang (ex-Maharashtra cricketer) started organizing cricket training.

The core of cricketers in Serbia consists of its own domestic players, unlike many other Eastern and Southern European cricket teams. In addition to domestic players, the teams are composed of expats such as Indians, Pakistanis, British and New Zealanders.

The development of cricket in Serbia paved the way for the establishment of the Serbian Cricket Federation (SCF) in 2009, and the first national 40-over and T20 championship in the country.

== Clubs in Serbian Cricket Federation ==
Given below is the list of various operating cricket clubs in Serbia, which play different tournaments organised by Serbian Cricket Federation:-

1. Stari Grad CC: One of the founding cricket teams in Belgrade and Serbia. 2009 champions in 40 over league and 2010 champions of T20 cricket. Headquartered at Dositejeva 1a, 11000 Beograd
2. Mirijevo CC: Along with Stari Grad CC the pioneers of cricket in Belgrade. 2009 and 2012 Serbian T20 League champions; Serbian 40 over league champions in 2010; Cricket 6s cup winners in 2011. They have headquarter at Milivoja Perovića 8, 11060 Beograd
3. McKenzie Cricket Club: It is by far the most successful club outside of Belgrade. It was established by the group of players from the town of Čačak, of which one part works and studies in the capital. McKenzie won 40 over Championships in 2011 and 2012, as well as the T20 championship in 2011. They have Headquarter at Milorada i Radovana Petrovića 2, 32000 Čačak
4. Vračar CC: Established at the beginning of 2011, following the initiative from Stari Grad CC and students and staff of the Faculties of Philosophy and Architecture. The club has given special attention to working with school children. they have headquarter at Kneginje Zorke 51, 11000 Beograd
5. Valjevac CC: This cricket club is the first one established in Valjevo. Their long-term goal is to develop the junior cricket section in Valjevo and the Kolubara region, and also to establish regular international tournaments in Valjevo. Their address is Jovanja BB, Valjevo
6. Kablarski Soko CC: Established in 2009, the club participated in domestic seasons 2009 and 2010. The club is involved in the development and promotion of cricket in Čačak and western Serbia. Their address is Cricket club Kablarski Soko, Bulevar Oslobođenja 50, 32000 Čačak
7. Perun Delije CC: Established in 2010. The club's headquarters are in a village called Sovljak, near Ub. The club also possesses a cricket ground.

== Plan ==
The plan for 2016 included:

1. Further promotion of the game of cricket in Serbia
2. Expanding player basis and improving training conditions
3. Providing basic playing facilities
4. Organization of the first domestic competitions: cup and championship
5. Organization of the first international match of Serbia National Team and putting Serbia on the world cricket map.

== See also ==
- Cricket in Serbia
- Serbia national cricket team
