= List of Gibraltar Twenty20 International cricketers =

This is a list of Gibraltarian Twenty20 International cricketers. In April 2018, the ICC decided to grant full Twenty20 International (T20I) status to all its members. Therefore, all Twenty20 matches played between Gibraltar and other ICC members after 1 January 2019 have the full T20I status.

This list comprises names of all members of the Gibraltar cricket team who have played at least one T20I match. It is initially arranged in the order in which each player won his first Twenty20 cap. Where more than one player won his first Twenty20 cap in the same match, they are listed alphabetically by surname. Gibraltar played their first T20I matches during the 2019 Iberia Cup in October 2019.

== Key ==
General

- ‡ – Captain
- † – Wicket-keeper
- First – Year of debut
- Last – Year of latest game
- Mat – Number of matches played

Batting

- Runs – Runs scored in career
- HS – Highest score
- Avg – Runs scored per dismissal
- 50 – Number of half centuries
- 100 – Centuries scored
- * – Batsman remained not out

Bowling

- Balls – Balls bowled in career
- Wkt – Wickets taken in career
- BBI – Best bowling in an innings
- Ave – Average runs per wicket

Fielding

- Ca – Catches taken
- St – Stumpings affected

== List of players ==
Statistics are correct as of 14 July 2026.

Gibraltar T20I cricketers
General					Batting					Bowling				Fielding		Ref
No.	Name	First	Last	Mat	Runs	HS	Avg	50	100	Balls	Wkt	BBI	Ave	Ca	St	Ref
1	Mark Bacarese	2019	2023	4	28	13	9.33	0	0	72	2	1/15	25.50	1	0	
2	Luke Collado†	2019	2021	9	24	8	12.00	0	0	–	–	–	–	2	3	
3	Chris Delany	2019	2021	13	243	69*	24.30	2	0	50	1	1/37	95.00	3	0	
4	James Fitzgerald	2019	2026	42	356	28*	16.18	0	0	387	14	2/30	46.78	13	0	
5	Julian Freyone	2019	2023	15	105	21*	8.75	0	0	–	–	–	–	3	0	
6	Mark Garratt	2019	2021	8	7	4	3.50	0	0	47	2	1/12	31.50	1	0	
7	Richard Hatchman	2019	2025	20	138	32	10.61	0	0	216	5	1/21	86.20	2	0	
8	Matthew Hunter‡	2019	2019	4	45	27	15.00	0	0	69	4	2/22	15.75	1	0	
9	Kenroy Nestor	2019	2026	43	254	35	10.58	0	0	451	19	3/19	36.10	12	0	
10	Edmund Packard‡	2019	2021	8	49	26	7.00	0	0	156	6	3/34	32.16	2	0	
11	Avinash Pai‡	2019	2026	45	1,084	107*	30.97	6	1	807	37	3/13	23.21	15	0	
12	Tim Caruana	2019	2019	2	5	5	5.00	0	0	–	–	–	–	0	0	
13	Nikhil Advani	2019	2025	10	4	2*	1.33	0	0	62	5	4/14	14.80	2	0	
14	Adam Orfila	2019	2021	5	7	4*	–	0	0	90	4	2/34	33.75	0	0	
15	Louis Bruce	2021	2026	55	1,223	99*	26.88	13	0	855	38	4/13	30.28	22	0	
16	Charles Harrison	2021	2021	7	2	2	2.00	0	0	118	6	2/31	31.33	1	0	
17	Patrick Hatchman	2021	2023	13	74	22	9.25	0	0	6	0	–	–	6	0	
18	Joseph Marples†	2021	2024	20	49	16	9.80	0	0	30	0	–	–	12	4	
19	Richard Cunningham	2021	2022	7	10	7*	–	0	0	38	3	1/16	26.00	0	0	
20	Philip Raikes	2021	2026	26	728	74*	30.33	5	0	–	–	–	–	12	0	
21	Andrew Reyes	2021	2025	29	171	44	14.25	0	0	273	19	3/10	19.89	9	0	
22	Dave Robeson	2021	2021	1	–	–	–	–	–	–	–	–	–	0	0	
23	Kieron Ferrary†	2021	2026	19	383	58*	29.46	2	0	272	18	4/11	17.27	8	0	
24	Samarth Bodha	2022	2026	34	77	25	9.62	0	0	596	37	5/16	22.81	7	0	
25	Mark Gouws	2022	2024	13	82	37	11.71	0	0	158	5	3/22	48.20	1	0	
26	Zachary Simpson	2022	2022	2	–	–	–	–	–	17	2	2/32	16.00	0	0	
27	Matthew Whelan	2022	2026	17	86	27	10.75	0	0	108	4	1/16	53.75	2	0	
28	Christian Rocca	2022	2022	2	14	14	14.00	0	0	–	–	–	–	0	0	
29	Iain Latin‡	2022	2026	40	829	89	24.38	4	0	329	22	4/25	22.40	19	0	
30	Kayron Stagno‡†	2022	2026	29	744	101	27.57	4	1	–	–	–	–	11	2	
31	Ian Farrell	2022	2022	1	0	0	0.00	0	0	–	–	–	–	0	0	
32	Jack Horrocks	2023	2026	23	57	20*	11.40	0	0	312	11	2/15	41.72	4	0	
33	Kabir Mirpuri	2023	2026	37	249	34*	35.57	0	0	725	34	3/16	29.91	11	0	
34	Jonathan West	2023	2023	4	32	14	8.00	0	0	–	–	–	–	2	0	
35	Bryan Zammitt	2023	2023	3	10	9	3.33	0	0	5	0	–	–	1	0	
36	Alex Sawyer	2023	2024	3	–	–	–	–	–	12	0	–	–	0	0	
37	Harry Pile	2024	2026	4	3	2	3.00	0	0	–	–	–	–	2	0	
38	Chris Pyle†	2024	2026	22	370	47	21.76	0	0	–	–	–	–	9	15	
39	Michael Raikes	2024	2025	7	248	85	41.33	3	0	59	3	2/15	45.33	1	0	
40	Joe Wilson	2025	2026	11	64	31*	21.33	0	0	171	8	2/27	38.25	3	0	
41	Anthony Hillman	2026	2026	4	117	50*	58.50	0	0	–	–	–	–	2	0	
42	Matthew Walker	2026	2026	4	2	1*	2.00	0	0	84	3	2/28	37.66	1	0	
43	Mohamed Roshan	2026	2026	1	–	–	–	–	–	16	0	–	–	0	0	
44	Alexander Hillman	2026	2026	2	22	22	22.00	0	0	16	0	–	–	0	0	
