= Venetian arsenal, Gouvia =

Venetian shipyard

Coordinates: 39°39′8.86″N 19°50′48.64″E

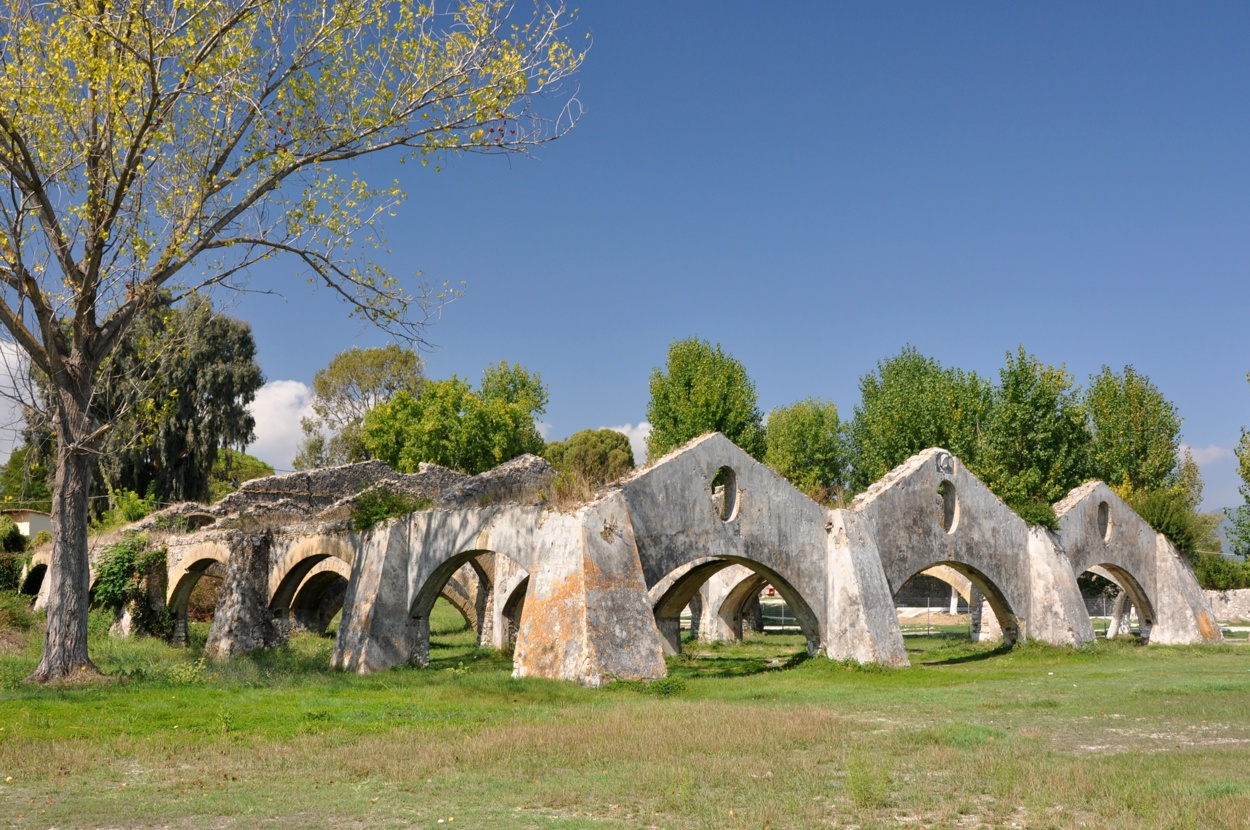
The three berths of the Arsenal at Gouvia

The Venetian arsenal at Gouvia was a shipyard built by the Republic of Venice during their rule over the island of Corfu. It was located on the west side of what used to be called "Govino Bay", the current location of the modern village of Gouvia.

The arsenal was built in 1716 as part of defenses against the Ottomans. It was abandoned by the Venetians in 1798, with the fall of the Venetian Republic.

In 2017, the regional director of the Ionian Islands approved the sum of €500,000 for the "rehabilitation and promotion of the Venetian arsenal at Gouvia". These projects are the first for the Ionian Islands for the 2014-2020 fiscal year and they are funded by the European Regional Development Fund (ERDF) and the Greek government.

== Description ==
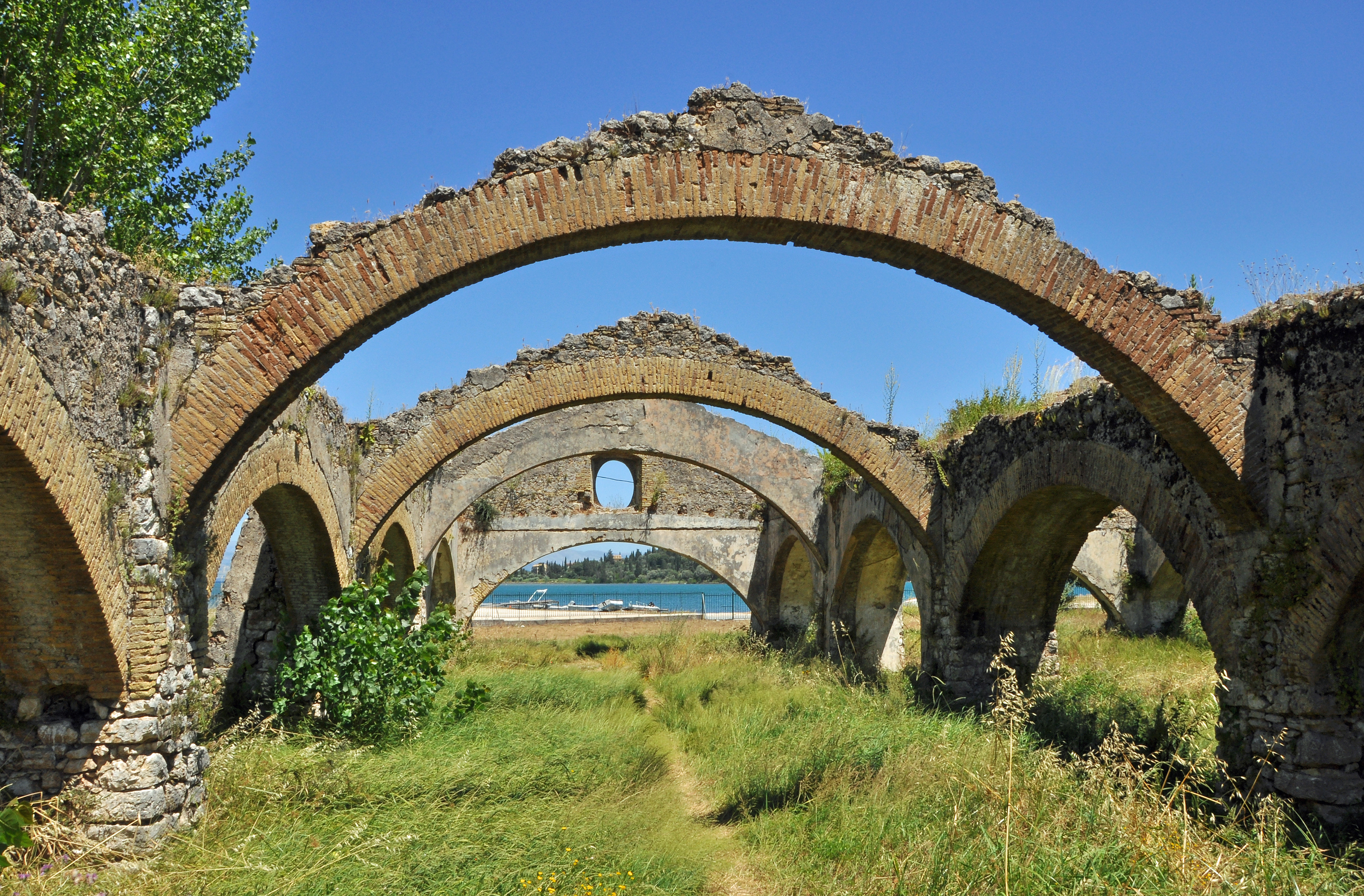
The arches with Gouvia Bay in the background

The remains of the old arsenal still exist at the Bay of Gouvia, and are located approximately 8 km from Corfu city. The ruins are behind the modern marina of the port of Gouvia and are separated from it by an iron fence.

The Venetian shipyard features three arched docks which were used to service their two fleets which were stationed in Corfu. The columns, walls and arches of the arsenal survive almost intact but the roof is missing. The arches have been described as "beautifully boned", "strong" and "impressive", "almost surreal", and "a striking collection of skeletal arches".

== History ==
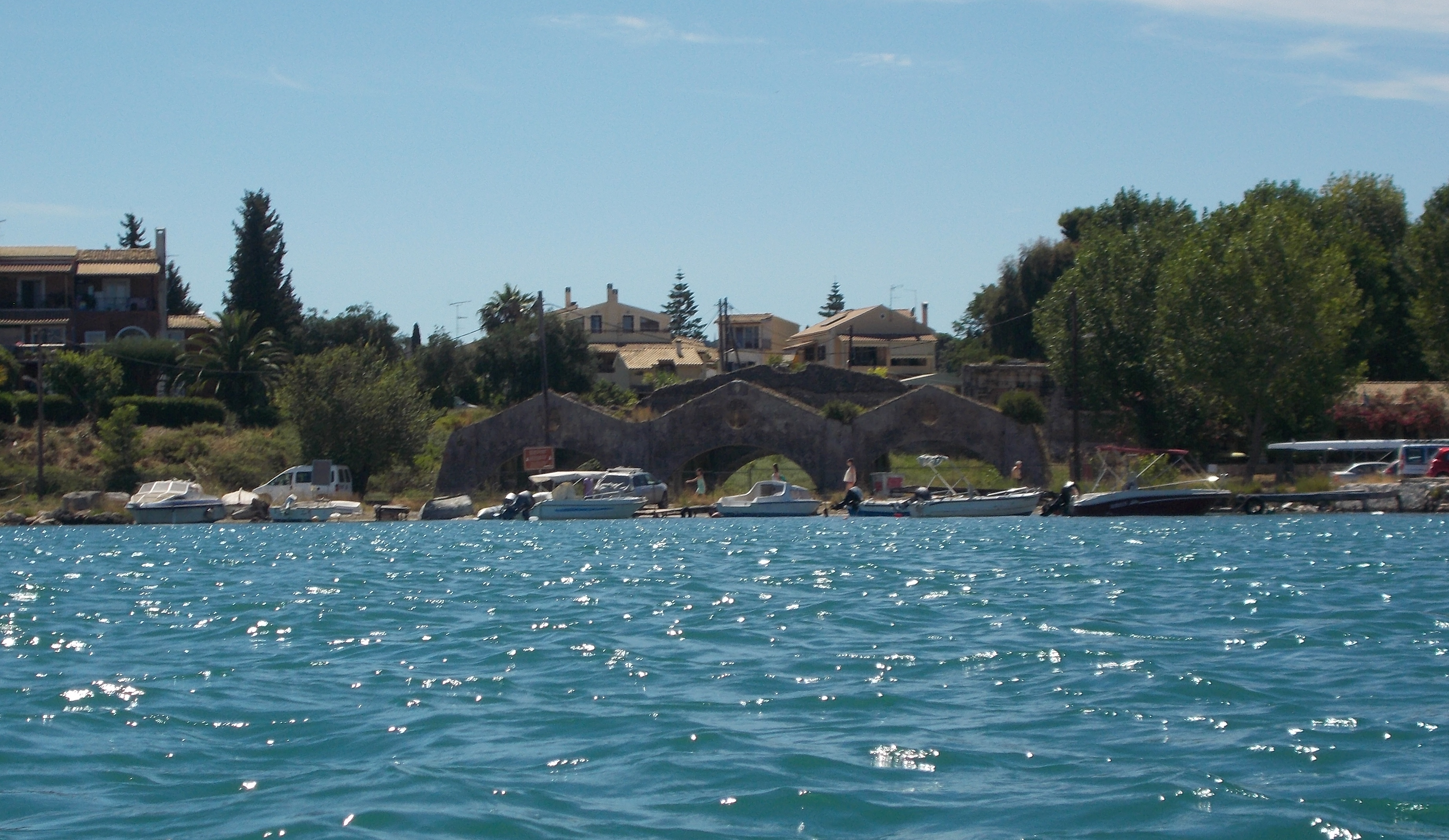
View of the Corfu Venetian arsenal from the bay of Gouvia

Located near the mouth of the Adriatic Sea, Corfu was a very strategic location for Venice and the Venetians built extensive fortifications to defend the island against incursions. The island was also at the centre of their naval operations in the Levant. As part of their defence plans the Venetians stationed two squadrons in Corfu, one of twenty five galleys, the other of twelve heavy sailing ships. Two Venetian Vice Admirals oversaw the naval operations in Corfu, one for each squadron.

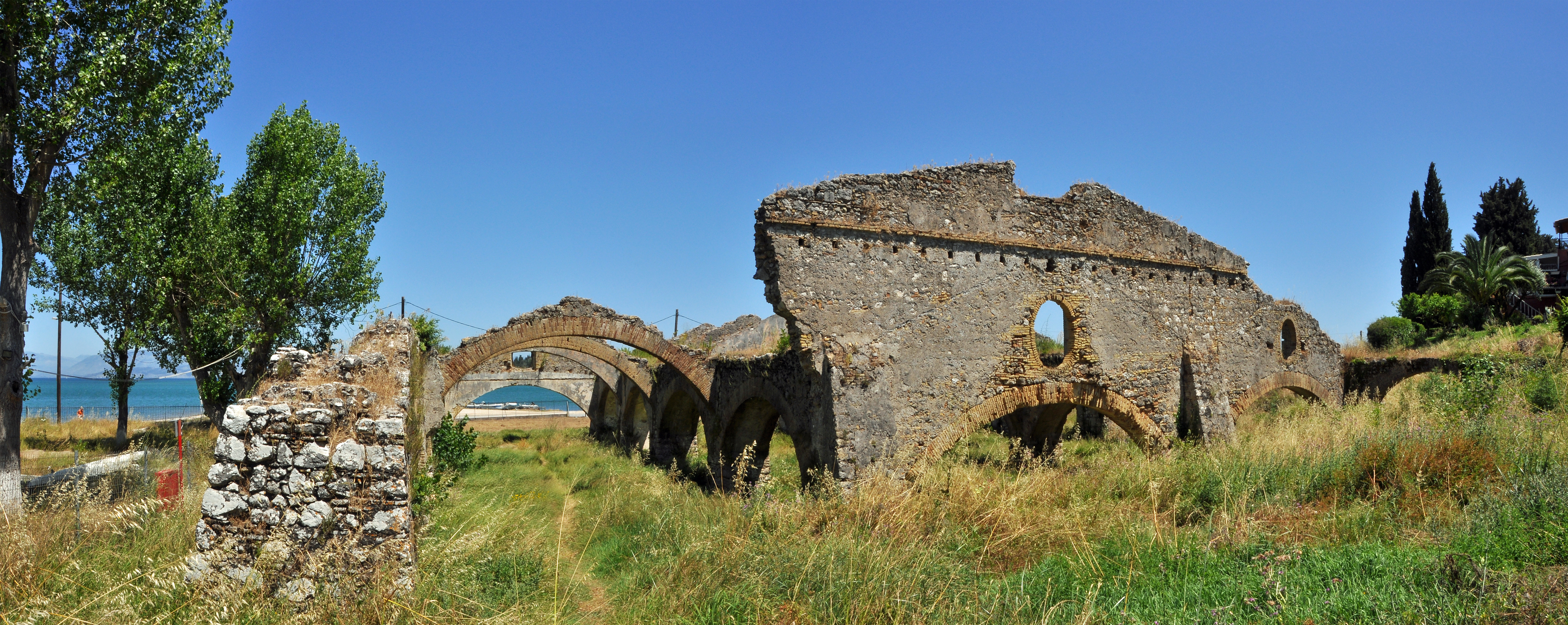
The rear wall of the shipyard

In the aftermath of the second great siege of Corfu by the Ottomans in 1716, the Venetians, as part of their reinforcement of the fortifications of Corfu, built the arsenal to service their ships, that used the bay as a port. Besides its strategic importance, the location was near a forested area that could provide high quality wood for ship repairs.

The shipyard at Gouvia was part of a network of Venetian arsenals and naval stations in Greece, including shipyards in the Aegean Sea, Epirus, the Peloponnese, the Kingdom of Candia (modern Crete) and even Venice itself. Aside from Corfu, such locations in Greece included Methoni, Koroni, Chalkis, Preveza, Chania and Heraklion.

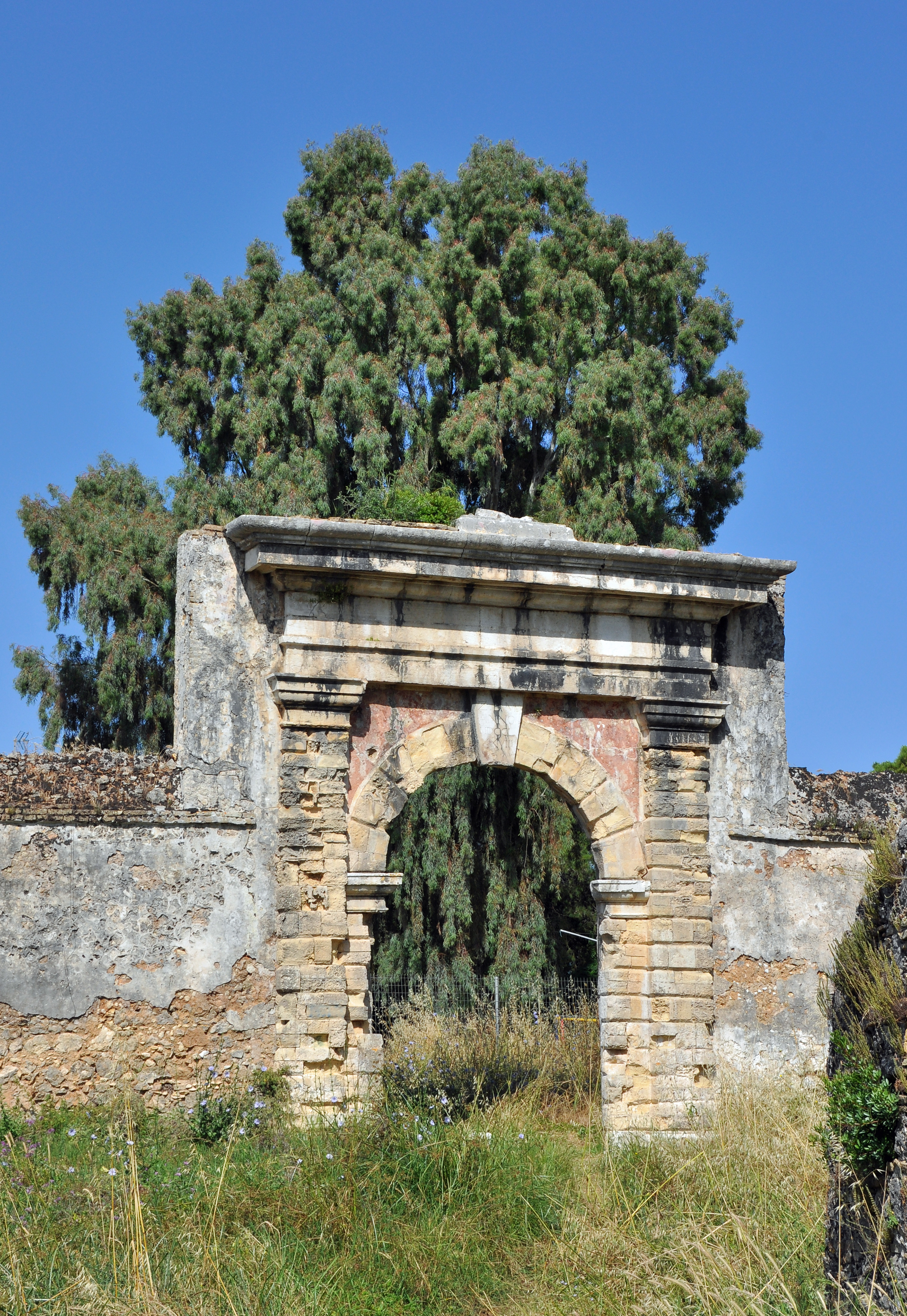
The gateway to the shipyard, with a dedication engraved on the keystone

The keystone of the arched gate at the entrance to the shipyard bears the inscription"ZBM/ANNO/MDCCL/XXVIII" in four lines. "ANNO MDCCLXXVIII" means "year 1778". The letters "ZBM" are probably the initials of one of the Venetian captains who constructed the arsenal and added their coat of arms and initials to the buildings. (This practice by the Venetian captains has been documented in the late-18th-century writings of French consul to Corfu Saint-Sauveur.)

The arsenal at Gouvia was supposed to be used for ship repairs during the winter after each fleet had returned from their yearly campaign during peacetime. However, the Venetian Senate became alarmed at the prospect of an arsenal in proximity to Venice which could potentially compete with the central arsenal in Venice. In order to protect the privileges of the latter, the Senate limited the repair activities at Corfu to basic maintenance such as cleaning and caulking. Many captains, instead of repairing their damaged ships at the arsenal, chose to sink them.

As time went on, the number of ships being serviced at the location declined. Use of the site was finally discontinued when the Treaty of Campo Formio, signed on 18 October 1798, put an end to the Republic of Venice and to the Venetian dominion over Corfu, which had lasted for over 400 years.

Admiral Ushakov landed his troops at the site of the arsenal and created a military camp there during the Siege of Corfu in 1798. The arsenal also functioned as a base for the French in 1917–1918.

== Conservation and restoration ==
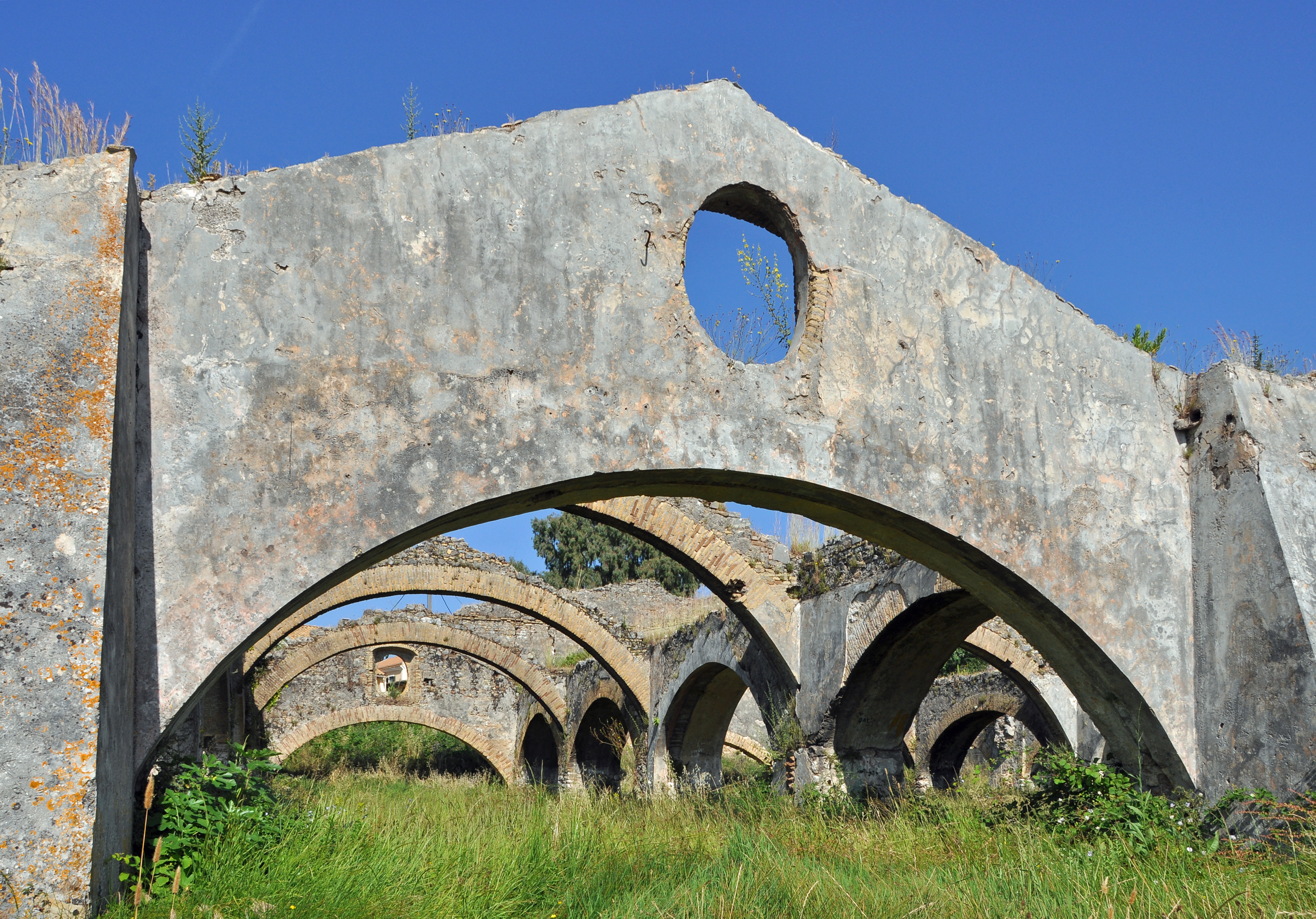
The arches of the docks

In 2011, the regional director of the Ionian Islands, submitted a plan to the Greek Ministry of Culture for the conservation and development of the ruins. The proposal includes the plans of the landmark which have been developed by the polytechnic of Bari which consist of photographs, historical analysis of the structure and diagrams. The study was funded by the European Union regional funding programme Interreg III Greece-Italy.

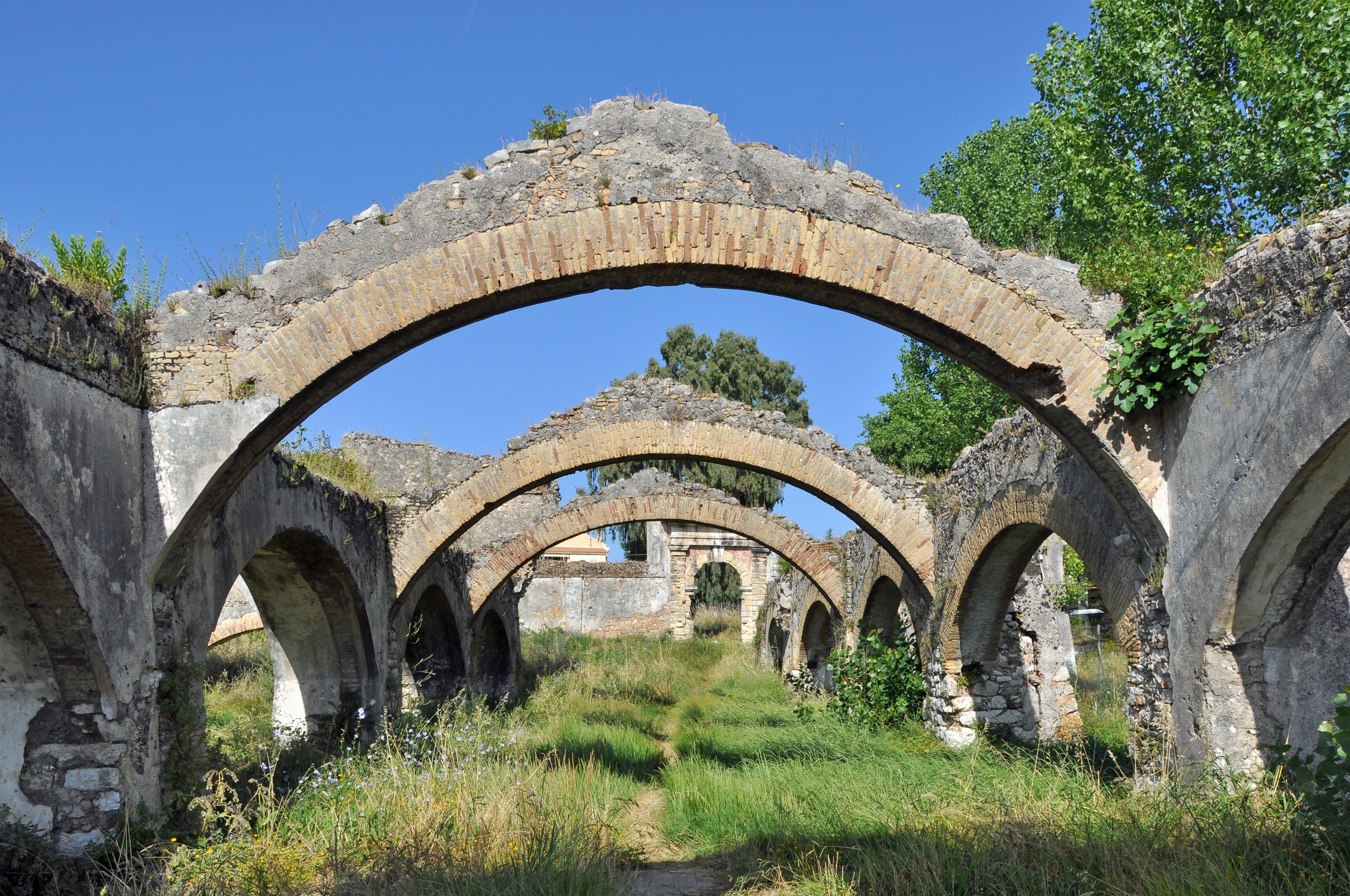
The gate as seen through the arches

The 2011 application of the director described the state of ruin and neglect of the arsenal which used to invite negative comments by visitors to the area, given the historical importance of the monument to the Ionian Islands and Greece, and suggested to the ministry the restoration of its walls and roof and its conversion to a Museum of the Sea. The application also included mention of the support of the proposal of the director of the 21st Ephorate of Byzantine Antiquities of Greece, who approved of the idea calling it "very good and indispensable".

The ministry, in response to the 2011 application, had expressed interest in the idea, and had described the arsenal as a monument of high importance for the Venetian period of Corfu. The Ministry also explained that the arsenal was not yet eligible for the special government programme which provides funds for the development of the Greek provinces but suggested a joint funding project with the participation of the Ionian Islands directorate. The ministry also proposed that the gate of the monument be immediately repaired and structurally braced for safety reasons, suggesting the participation of the 21st Ephorate in any future repair works.

In 2017, the regional director of the Ionian Islands approved the sum of €500,000 for the "rehabilitation and promotion of the Venetian arsenal at Gouvia". These projects are the first for the Ionian Islands for the 2014-2020 fiscal year and they are funded by the European Regional Development Fund (ERDF) and the Greek government.

On 22 May 2016, to celebrate the restoration of lighting to the monument, the local cultural agency of Gouvia and the Greek Society for the Environment organised a concert at the arsenal where the Philharmonic Society of Corfu Mantzaros and the German choir Dinkelsbühler Knabenkapelle from Neumarkt, Germany, performed marching songs.

== See also ==
- Venetian rule in the Ionian Islands
- Kerkyra
