= List of Bulgaria women Twenty20 International cricketers =

This is a list of Bulgaria women Twenty20 International cricketers. A Twenty20 International is an international cricket match between two representative teams, each having Twenty20 International status, as determined by the International Cricket Council (ICC). A Twenty20 International is played under the rules of Twenty20 cricket.

This list includes all players who have played at least one T20I match for Bulgaria and is arranged in the order of debut appearance. Where more than one player won their first cap in the same match, those players are initially listed alphabetically at the time of debut.

Bulgaria women's team played their first WT20I match against Serbia on 12 October 2024 during Serbia tour.

== Key ==
General

- ‡ – Captain
- † – Wicket-keeper
- First – Year of debut
- Last – Year of latest game
- Mat – Number of matches played

Batting

- Runs – Runs scored in career
- HS – Highest score
- 50 – Number of half centuries
- Avg – Runs scored per dismissal
- * – Batter remained not out

Bowling

- Wkt – Wickets taken in career
- BBI – Best bowling in an innings
- Ave – Average runs per wicket

Fielding

- Ca – Catches taken
- St – Stumpings affected

== List of players ==
Statistics are correct as of 6 September 2026.

Bulgaria women T20I cricketers
| General | | | | | Batting | | | | Bowling | | | | Fielding | | Ref |
| No. | Name | First | Last | Mat | Runs | HS | Avg | 50 | Balls | Wkt | BBI | Ave | Ca | St | Ref |
|---|---|---|---|---|---|---|---|---|---|---|---|---|---|---|---|
| 1 | Slaveya Galabova | 2024 | 2026 | 27 | 143 | 30 | 6.50 | 0 | 96 | 3 | 2/16 | 53.33 | 2 | 0 | |
| 2 | Nela Gocheva | 2024 | 2025 | 7 | 1 | 1* | 0.25 | 0 | – | – | – | – | 1 | 0 | |
| 3 | Gabriela Ilarionova | 2024 | 2026 | 19 | 139 | 39 | 9.26 | 0 | 301 | 12 | 2/15 | 34.33 | 9 | 0 | |
| 4 | Vili Nikolova† | 2024 | 2026 | 27 | 267 | 60 | 9.80 | 1 | 70 | 0 | – | – | 12 | 1 | |
| 5 | Kalina Paskova | 2024 | 2026 | 13 | 2 | 1* | 0.25 | 0 | 138 | 3 | 1/18 | 72.33 | 1 | 0 | |
| 6 | Detelina Ruynekova‡ | 2024 | 2026 | 27 | 301 | 38* | 13.08 | 0 | 240 | 13 | 3/14 | 23.30 | 4 | 0 | |
| 7 | Stanislava Sarandeva | 2024 | 2026 | 24 | 125 | 50 | 5.20 | 1 | 390 | 19 | 4/17 | 24.42 | 5 | 0 | |
| 8 | Bilyana Shotorova | 2024 | 2026 | 19 | 64 | 15 | 3.55 | 0 | 312 | 12 | 3/24 | 31.16 | 3 | 0 | |
| 9 | Katrin Srandeva | 2024 | 2025 | 23 | 74 | 17 | 4.93 | 0 | 366 | 15 | 2/10 | 33.60 | 3 | 0 | |
| 10 | Nadia Toleva | 2024 | 2025 | 18 | 9 | 3* | 0.90 | 0 | 140 | 4 | 1/12 | 62.25 | 2 | 0 | |
| 11 | Magdalena Zdravkova | 2024 | 2024 | 10 | 2 | 1* | 1.00 | 0 | 76 | 1 | 1/10 | 91.00 | 0 | 0 | |
| 12 | Iva Stoilova | 2024 | 2024 | 3 | 0 | 0 | 0.00 | 0 | – | – | – | – | 0 | 0 | |
| 13 | Aleksa Stoilova | 2024 | 2026 | 13 | 38 | 20 | 3.80 | 0 | 37 | 0 | – | – | 0 | 0 | |
| 14 | Martina Abadjieva | 2025 | 2026 | 17 | 53 | 11* | 4.41 | 0 | – | – | – | – | 4 | 0 | |
| 15 | Simona Yordanova | 2025 | 2025 | 7 | 58 | 23 | 11.60 | 0 | – | – | – | – | 1 | 0 | |
| 16 | Tanaya Dissanayake | 2025 | 2025 | 7 | 141 | 61* | 28.20 | 1 | 144 | 3 | 2/7 | 41.66 | 2 | 0 | |
| 17 | Ventislava Atanasova | 2025 | 2025 | 6 | 1 | 1 | 0.33 | 0 | 64 | 2 | 2/51 | 68.00 | 0 | 0 | |
| 18 | Valentina Kostova | 2025 | 2025 | 3 | 0 | 0* | 0.00 | 0 | – | – | – | – | 0 | 0 | |
| 19 | Krastina Ivanova | 2026 | 2026 | 5 | 22 | 10 | 5.50 | 0 | – | – | – | – | 0 | 0 | |
| 20 | Deya Stefanova | 2026 | 2026 | 6 | 2 | 1* | 0.66 | 0 | 126 | 2 | 2/23 | 69.50 | 0 | 0 | |
| 21 | Nevena Tropolova | 2026 | 2026 | 3 | 5 | 4* | 5.00 | 0 | 30 | 2 | 1/11 | 21.50 | 0 | 0 | |
| 22 | Katrin Eftimova | 2026 | 2026 | 5 | 15 | 1@* | 1.00 | 0 | – | – | – | – | 2 | 0 | |
| 23 | Katrin Eftimova | 2026 | 2026 | 2 | 2 | 2 | 2.00 | 0 | – | – | – | – | 2 | 0 | |
| 24 | Victoria Nikolova | 2026 | 2026 | 1 | 0 | 0 | 0.00 | 0 | – | – | – | – | 0 | 0 | |
| 25 | Ilievea Monika | 2026 | 2026 | 1 | – | – | – | – kfc | – | – | – | – | 0 | 0 | |
| 26 | Danaya Ilieva | 2026 | 2026 | 4 | 0 | 0 | 0.00 | 0 | 66 | 3 | 2/32 | 39.33 | 0 | 0 | |
