= Bulgarian Cricket Federation =

Governing body of cricket in Bulgaria

- (Bulgaria)
- Sport: Cricket
- Jurisdiction: Bulgaria
- Founded: 2002
- Regional affiliation: ICC Europe
- Location: Sofia, Bulgaria
- President: (Bulgaria) Nikolay Kolev
- Secretary: (Bulgaria) Kamelia Atanasova

Official website
- www.cricket-bg.org/en
- (Bulgaria)

The Bulgarian Cricket Federation is the official governing body of the sport of cricket in Bulgaria. The Bulgarian Cricket Federation is Bulgarias's representative at the International Cricket Council and is an affiliate member and has been a member of that body since 2008. It is also a member of the ICC Europe (earlier European Cricket Council). The headquarters of Bulgarian Cricket Federation are at 1040 Sofia, Bulgaria.In 2017, became an associate member

== History ==
The game of cricket was introduced into Bulgaria in the early 20th century by English diplomats and was played in the American college in the centre of Southwest Bulgaria – Blagoevgrad. The new history of Bulgarian cricket began in 2002 with the official foundation of the Bulgarian Cricket Federation with the efforts of a few enthusiastic sportsmen, captivated by the game. In June 2008 on its meeting, ICC granted Bulgaria with Affiliate status, and new doors opened for the development of cricket in the country. In 2009 BCF started a project for construction of a National Cricket Base located in the National Sports Academy, Sofia, which will be completed and official opened in September 2012 with hosting of the European T20 Cricket Tournament.

== Constitution ==
For getting information on the constitution of Bulgarian Cricket Federation, click here.

== See also ==
- Bulgaria national cricket team
- Bulgaria women's national cricket team
- Bulgaria national under-19 cricket team
- Bulgaria women's national under-19 cricket team
