= Kontokali =

Suburb of Corfu Town, Ionian Islands

Coordinates: 39.646°N 19.85°E

- Settlement
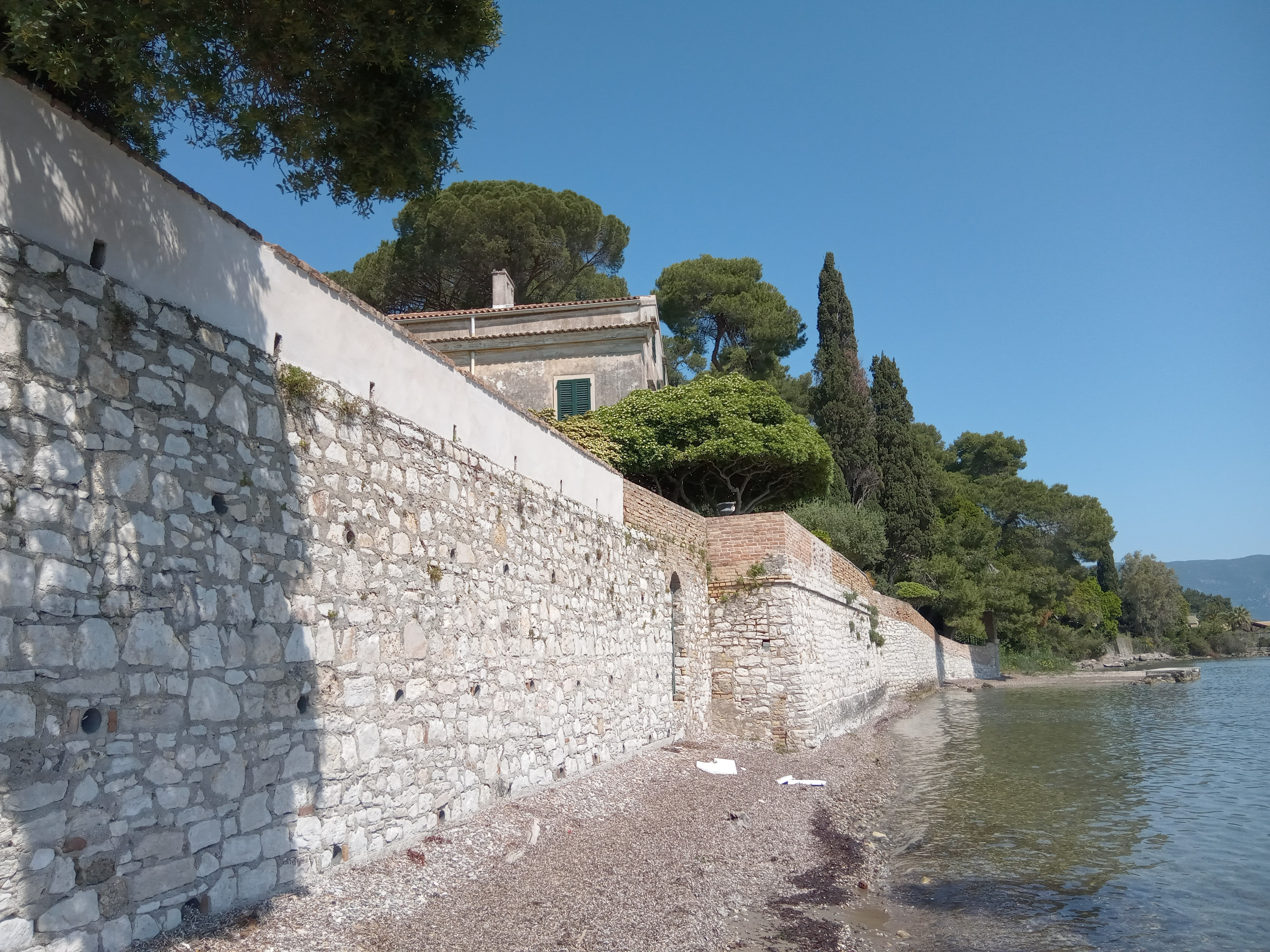
- Villa Posilippo in Kontokali, notably used in the TV series The Durrells
- Interactive map of Kontokali
- Country: Greece
- Time zone: UTC+2 (EET)
  - Summer (DST): UTC+3 (EEST)

Kontokali (Greek: Κοντόκαλι) is a suburb of Corfu Town, located 6.8 km north of the city centre. It is named after Christophoros Kontokalis, a sea captain and shipowner who was awarded the estate by the Venetians after his successful participation in the Battle of Lepanto.

It lies on a headland separating the gulf from the natural harbour and marina at Gouvia. The eastern side of the headland, looking back towards Corfu Town, features a narrow sandy beach in front of a row of private villas. Resort spas, sailing and diving centres can be found towards the tip of the peninsula. The western side of the headland merges into Gouvia and the marina.
