= Greece national cricket team =

Cricket team

Greece
- Flag of Greece
- Association: Hellenic Cricket Federation

Personnel
- Captain: Amarpreet Mehmi
- Coach: Tim Dellor

International Cricket Council
- ICC status: Associate member with T20I status (2017)
- ICC region: Europe
ICC Rankings	Current	Best-ever
T20I	97th	62nd (2 May 2022)

International cricket
- First international: Greece v. Spain (St Peter Port, Guernsey; 21 May 1990)

T20 Internationals
- First T20I: v Serbia at Marina Ground, Corfu; 15 October 2019
- Last T20I: v Israel at Tikkurila Cricket Ground, Vantaa; 20 August 2026
T20Is	Played	Won/Lost
Total	19	3/15 (0 ties, 1 no result)
This year	4	0/4 (0 ties, 0 no result)
T20I kit
- As of 20 August 2026

The Greece national cricket team is the team that represents the country of Greece in international cricket. The side is organised by the Hellenic Cricket Federation, which became an affiliate member of the International Cricket Council (ICC) in 1995 and an associate member in 2017.

== History ==
=== Early history ===
Greece made its international debut at the 1990 European Cricketer Cup in Guernsey, and has participated regularly in European Cricket Council tournaments since then. Cricket in the country is played mainly on the island of Corfu. This strong cricket tradition is due to the 50 years British rule of the Ionian islands at the time of the liberation of Greece from the Ottoman Empire. Efforts are currently underway to expand the game further outside Corfu.

=== Modern history ===
The Greek cricket team appeared in every edition of the ECC Trophy from 1999 to 2005, hosting and winning the tournament in 1999. This enabled them to play in Division Two of the European Championship in 2000, finishing in sixth place. They once again played in the tournament in 2006, but this time they met with controversy. After winning all three of their first round group games, they looked to be a favourite for the tournament, and promotion to Division One. However, it was revealed that they had fielded two ineligible players and their wins were cancelled. Then they opted not to travel to RAF Lossiemouth to play Israel in the eighth place play-off, despite being fully aware that this would forfeit that game, and relegate them.

In September 2009 Greece took part in the 2009 European Cricket Championship Division Five in Corfu, Greece. The national team won the event with five wins out the five games .

=== 2018-Present ===
In April 2018, the ICC decided to grant full Twenty20 International (T20I) status to all its members. Therefore, all Twenty20 matches played between Greece and other ICC members after 1 January 2019 will be a full T20I.

Greece played their first T20I on 15 October 2019, against Serbia, during the 2019 Hellenic Premier League.

15 October 2019
14:30
Scorecard

Serbia; 52 (15.2 overs)	v	Greece; 56/0 (4.3 overs)
Apon Mustafizur 11 (26); Arslan Ahmed 3/15 (4 overs)		Muhammad Awais 32* (18)

Greece won by 10 wickets
Marina Ground, Gouvia
Umpires: Ioannis Afthinos (Gre) and Ruban Sivanadian (Can)

- Greece won the toss and elected to field.
- First ever T20I match for Greece.

== International Grounds ==
Locations of grounds which have hosted international cricket matches within Greece

== Tournament history ==
=== European Cricket Championship ===
- 2000: 6th place (Division Two)
- 2006: Disqualified (Division Two)
- 2009: 1st place (Division Five)
- 2011: 6th place (Division Two)
- 2012: 5th place (Division 2)
- 2014: 4th place (Division 3)

The last squad to participate in Division 3 is as follows:

- Anastasios Manousis( Captain)
- Spiros Bogdos
- Spiros Gasteratos
- Spiros Goustis
- Alexandros Grammenos
- Nasos Karakantas
- Andrew Koutsoufis
- Alex Lagos
- Christos Molinaris
- Othonas Nikitas
- Spiros Nikokavoura
- Alexandros Souvlakis
- Dimitris Triantafillidis
- Ioannis Vasilas
- Stylianos Goustis (Team Manager)

In 2012 the European T20 Championship was held in Corfu. Hellas were captained by former Hampshire wicket-keeper Nic Pothas.

== Records and statistics ==
International Match Summary — Greece

Last updated 20 August 2026

Playing Record
Format	M	W	L	T	NR	Inaugural Match
Twenty20 Internationals	19	3	15	0	1	15 October 2019

=== Twenty20 International ===
- Highest team total: 157/8 v Romania on 24 June 2021 at National Sports Academy, Sofia.
- Highest individual score: 61, Aslam Mohammad v Romania on 24 June 2021 at National Sports Academy, Sofia.
- Best individual bowling figures: 3/12, Spyridon Bantzas v Bulgaria on 16 October 2019 at Marina Ground, Corfu.

T20I record versus other nations

Records complete to T20I #4092. Last updated 20 August 2026.

Opponent	M	W	L	T	NR	First match	First win
vs Associate Members
Bulgaria	4	1	2	0	1	16 October 2019	16 October 2019
Croatia	1	0	1	0	0	15 July 2022	
Cyprus	1	0	1	0	0	24 August 2024	
Czech Republic	2	0	2	0	0	27 August 2024	
Denmark	1	0	1	0	0	22 August 2024	
Finland	1	0	1	0	0	16 July 2022	
Germany	1	0	1	0	0	18 August 2026	
Israel	1	0	1	0	0	20 August 2026	
Italy	1	0	1	0	0	12 July 2022	
Portugal	1	0	1	0	0	17 August 2026	
Romania	1	0	1	0	0	24 June 2021	
Serbia	2	2	0	0	0	15 October 2019	15 October 2019
Spain	1	0	1	0	0	25 August 2024	
Sweden	1	0	1	0	0	18 July 2022	

== See also ==
- List of Greece Twenty20 International cricketers
