= 2019 Hellenic Premier League =

Cricket tournament

- Dates: 14 – 19 October 2019
- Cricket format: Twenty20 International and Twenty20
- Tournament format(s): Round-robin, final
- Host: Greece
- Champions: Greece (Bulgaria won the T20I event)
- Runners-up: Forge Athens
- Participants: 6 (3 international)
- Matches: 11 (4 international) (Note: 10 matches (including 3 T20Is) were played in the 2019 Hellenic Premier League. Bulgaria and Greece also played an additional match – that did not count towards the Hellenic Premier League – to determine the winner of the T20I event.)
- Most runs: (Bulgaria) Kiran Dasan (114) (Note: Statistics are for the T20I matches only.)
- Most wickets: (Greece) Georgios Galanis (5) (Bulgaria) Prakash Mishra (5)

The 2019 Hellenic Premier League (HPL) was a Twenty20 International (T20I) cricket tournament held in Gouvia, Corfu, Greece between 14 and 19 October 2019. The participating teams were the hosts Greece, along with Bulgaria, Serbia and three Greek club sides (Athens Pak, Corfu Pak and Forge Athens). All of the national teams played their first matches with T20I status during the tournament, following the decision of the International Cricket Council (ICC) to grant full Twenty20 International status to all its members from 1 January 2019.

The international teams competed in one group and the three club sides competed in a second group. The top two sides in the international group played a stand-alone final, that was not part of the HPL, to determine the winner of the international event; Bulgaria defeated Greece in the final by 18 runs.

The group stage was followed by semi-finals and a final for the overall HPL event. Greece defeated Corfu Pak in the first of the semi-finals. In the second semi-final, Forge Athens defeated Bulgaria to join Greece in the final. Greece won the final by 81 runs. Bulgaria won the third-place play-off by 7 wickets.

== International group ==
=== Points table ===
Team	P	W	L	T	NR	Pts	NRR
Greece	2	2	0	0	0	4	+5.738
Bulgaria	2	1	1	0	0	2	–1.450
Serbia	2	0	2	0	0	0	–4.444

=== Fixtures ===
14 October 2019
14:30
Scorecard

Serbia; 156/6 (20 overs)	v	Bulgaria; 161/4 (18 overs)
Leslie Dunbar 104* (61); Prakash Mishra 3/12 (4 overs)		Kiran Dasan 74 (59); Apon Mustafizur 2/30 (3 overs)

Bulgaria won by 6 wickets
Marina Ground, Gouvia
Umpires: Ioannis Afthinos (Gre) and Ruban Sivanadian (Mlt)

- Serbia won the toss and elected to bat.
- Agagyul Ahmadhel, Kiran Dasan, Valter Dikov, Boiko Ivanov, Hristo Ivanov, Ivaylo Katzarski, Hristo Lakov, Prakash Mishra, Nikolay Nankov, Dimo Nikolov, Subinthan Soosiyakumar (Bul), Rahman Ademi, Bilal Ahmed, Haris Dajc, Aleksa Djorovic, Bogdan Dugic, Leslie Dunbar, Sakib Hasan, Apon Mustafizur, Stefan Nerandzic, Jovan Reb and Matija Sarenac (Srb) all made their T20I debuts.
- Leslie Dunbar became the first batsman for Serbia to score a century in T20Is.

15 October 2019
14:30
Scorecard

Serbia; 52 (15.2 overs)	v	Greece; 56/0 (4.3 overs)
Apon Mustafizur 11 (26); Arslan Ahmed 3/15 (4 overs)		Muhammad Awais 32* (18)

Greece won by 10 wickets
Marina Ground, Gouvia
Umpires: Ioannis Afthinos (Gre) and Ruban Sivanadian (Mlt)

- Greece won the toss and elected to field.
- Arslan Ahmed, Asrar Ahmed, Alexandros Anemogiannis, Alexandros Aspiotis, Muhammad Awais, Georgios Galanis, Spyridon Goustis, Anastasios Manousis, Amarpreet Mehmi, Aslam Mohammad, Shaffeq Muhammad (Gre) and Ivan Civric (Srb) all made their T20I debuts.

16 October 2019
10:30
Scorecard

Bulgaria; 94/8 (20 overs)	v	Greece; 97/1 (11 overs)
Hristo Lakov 27 (30); Spyridon Bantzas 3/12 (3 overs)		Muhammad Awais 42* (34); Dimo Nikolov 1/22 (2 overs)

Greece won by 9 wickets
Marina Ground, Gouvia
Umpires: Ioannis Afthinos (Gre) and Ruban Sivanadian (Mlt)

- Bulgaria win the toss and elected to bat.
- Spyridon Bantzas, Georgios Nikitas (Gre) and Nikolay Yordanov (Bul) all made their T20I debuts.

Final
18 October 2019
14:30
Scorecard

Bulgaria; 135/8 (20 overs)	v	Greece; 117/8 (20 overs)
Prakash Mishra 23 (11); Georgios Galanis 3/32 (4 overs)		Asrar Ahmed 25 (27); Kiran Dasan 3/23 (4 overs)

Bulgaria won by 18 runs
Marina Ground, Gouvia
Umpires: Ioannis Afthinos (Gre) and Rahan Patel (Gre)

- Greece won the toss and elected to field.
- Alexandros Lagos (Gre) made his T20I debut.
- Bulgaria won the international tournament. This match had no effect on the outcome of the Hellenic Premier League tournament.

== Club group ==
=== Points table ===
Team	P	W	L	T	NR	Pts	NRR
Forge Athens	2	2	0	0	0	4	
Corfu Pak	2	1	1	0	0	2	
Athens Pak	2	0	2	0	0	0	

=== Fixtures ===
14 October 2019
10:30

Athens Pak	v	Forge Athens

Forge Athens won
Marina Ground, Gouvia

15 October 2019
10:30

Athens Pak	v	Corfu Pak

Corfu Pak won
Marina Ground, Gouvia

16 October 2019
14:30

Forge Athens	v	Corfu Pak

Forge Athens won
Marina Ground, Gouvia

== Play-offs ==
Semi-final 1
17 October 2019
14:30

Greece	v	Corfu Pak

Greece won
Marina Ground, Gouvia

Semi-final 2
18 October 2019
10:30

Forge Athens; 170/6 (20 overs)	v	Bulgaria; 100/7 (20 overs)
Sajid Mohamed 62; Prakash Mishra 2/9		Prakash Mishra 35; Nabi Jaan 1/11 (3 overs)

Forge Athens won by 70 runs
Marina Ground, Gouvia

Third-place play-off
19 October 2019
14:30

Corfu Pak; 72 (16 overs)	v	Bulgaria; 76/3 (11.2 overs)
Akram Sabaz 23; Prakash Mishra 5/24 (4 overs)		Hristo Lakov 32; Akram Sabaz 2/8 (1 over)

Bulgaria won by 7 wickets
Marina Ground, Gouvia

- Corfu Pak won the toss and elected to bat.

Final
19 October 2019
10:30

Greece; 198/4 (20 overs)	v	Forge Athens; 117 (18 overs)
Anastasios Manousis 71 (35); Shabbir Arsalan 2/25		Amjad Amboo 38 (22); Spyridon Goustis 4/19 (4 overs)

Greece won by 81 runs
Marina Ground, Gouvia

- Forge Athens won the toss and elected to field.
- Greece won the 2019 Hellenic Premier League.
