= Serbia national cricket team =

Cricket team

Serbia
- Flag of Serbia
- Association: Serbian Cricket Federation

Personnel
- Captain: Mark Pavlovic
- Coach: Richard Black

International Cricket Council
- ICC status: Associate member (2017)
- ICC region: Europe
ICC Rankings	Current	Best-ever
T20I	81st	66th (18 July 2022)

T20 Internationals
- First T20I: v Bulgaria at Marina Ground, Corfu; 14 October 2019
- Last T20I: v Estonia at Koge Cricket Club, Køge; 14 July 2026
T20Is	Played	Won/Lost
Total	53	15/37 (0 ties, 1 no result)
This year	8	0/8 (0 ties, 0 no results)
T20I kit
- As of 14 July 2026

The Serbian national cricket team represents Serbia in international cricket. It is governed by the Serbian Cricket Federation (also known as Kriket federacija Srbije) which became an affiliate member of the International Cricket Council (ICC) in June 2015 and has been an associate member since 2017.

== History ==
Serbia's national team made its first away appearance in 2009. It won one match and lost the other against the Slovenian team Mezica CC. In August 2011, Serbia reached the semi-finals of the EuroT20 tournament in Budapest.

=== 2018-Present ===
In April 2018, the ICC decided to grant full Twenty20 International (T20I) status to all its members. Therefore, all Twenty20 matches played between Serbia and other ICC members after 1 January 2019 will be a full T20I.

Serbia played their first T20I on 14 October 2019, against Bulgaria, during the 2019 Hellenic Premier League.

14 October 2019
14:30
Scorecard

Serbia; 156/6 (20 overs)	v	Bulgaria; 161/4 (18 overs)
Leslie Dunbar 104* (61); Prakash Mishra 3/12 (4 overs)		Kiran Dasan 74 (59); Apon Mustafizur 2/30 (3 overs)

Bulgaria won by 6 wickets
Marina Ground, Gouvia
Umpires: Ioannis Afthinos (Gre) and Ruban Sivanadian (Can)

- Serbia won the toss and elected to bat.
- First ever T20I match for Serbia.

== Current squad ==
This lists all the players who have played for Serbia in the 2024–25 ICC Men's T20 World Cup Europe Qualifier. Updated as of 12 July 2024.

Name	Age	Batting style	Bowling style	Notes
Batters
Alexander Dizija	34	Right-handed	Right-arm medium	
Simo Ivetic	35	Right-handed	Right-arm medium	Vice-captain
Wintley Burton	35	Right-handed	Right-arm medium	
Edward van Reenen	45	Right-handed	Right-arm off break	
All-rounders
Slobodan Tosic	40	Right-handed	Right-arm off break	
Nemanja Zimonjic	22	Right-handed	Right-arm medium	
Luka Woods	21	Right-handed	Right-arm off break	
Wicketkeepers
Braithyn Pecic	20	Right-handed		
Leslie Dunbar	36	Right-handed		
Spin Bowler
Mark Pavlovic	42	Right-handed	Right-arm off break	Captain
Pace Bowlers
Alister Gajic	38	Right-handed	Right-arm medium	
Martija Sarenac	22	Right-handed	Right-arm medium	
Vukasin Zimonjic	21	Right-handed	Right-arm medium	
Peter Nedeljkovic	18	Right-handed	Right-arm medium	

== Records and statistics ==
International Match Summary — Serbia

Last updated 14 July 2026

Playing Record
Format	M	W	L	T	NR	Inaugural Match
Twenty20 Internationals	53	15	37	0	1	14 October 2019

=== Twenty20 International ===
- Highest team total: 242/4 v. Bulgaria on 26 June 2022 at National Sports Academy, Sofia.
- Highest individual score: 117, Leslie Dunbar v. Bulgaria on 26 June 2022 at National Sports Academy, Sofia.
- Best individual bowling figures: 4/12, Alister Gajić v. Bulgaria on 9 July 2022 at Lisičji Jarak Cricket Ground, Belgrade.

T20I record versus other nations

Records complete to T20I #4033. Last updated 14 July 2026.

Opponent	M	W	L	T	NR	First match	First win
vs Associate Members
Belgium	2	0	2	0	0	12 July 2024	
Bulgaria	13	3	9	0	1	14 October 2019	8 July 2022
Croatia	5	3	2	0	0	19 July 2022	24 June 2023
Cyprus	3	1	2	0	0	18 July 2022	18 July 2022
Czech Republic	2	0	2	0	0	27 June 2026	
Estonia	1	0	1	0	0	14 July 2026	
Gibraltar	5	0	5	0	0	5 October 2023	
Greece	2	0	2	0	0	15 October 2019	
Hungary	3	2	1	0	0	29 August 2025	29 August 2025
Isle of Man	1	0	1	0	0	13 July 2022	
Jersey	1	0	1	0	0	7 July 2024	
Luxembourg	2	0	2	0	0	26 June 2026	
Romania	4	0	4	0	0	25 June 2021	
Slovenia	6	4	2	0	0	29 June 2024	30 June 2024
Switzerland	1	0	1	0	0	11 July 2024	
Turkey	2	2	0	0	0	15 July 2022	15 July 2022

== See also ==
- Serbian Cricket Federation
- List of Serbia Twenty20 International cricketers
