= Bulgaria national cricket team =

Bulgaria
- Association: Bulgarian Cricket Federation

Personnel
- Captain: Milen Gogev
- Coach: Bashrat Hussain

International Cricket Council
- ICC status: Associate member (2017)
- ICC region: Europe
ICC Rankings	Current	Best-ever
T20I	85th	52th (30 Aug 2020)

International cricket
- First international: v. Switzerland at Ljubljana, Slovenia; 15 August 2004

T20 Internationals
- First T20I: v. Serbia at Marina Ground, Corfu; 14 October 2019
- Last T20I: v. Czech Republic at Kerava National Cricket Ground, Kerava; 21 August 2026
T20Is	Played	Won/Lost
Total	71	21/47 (0 ties, 3 no results)
This year	9	1/8 (0 ties, 0 no results)
T20I kit
- As of 21 August 2026

The Bulgaria national cricket team represents Bulgaria in international cricket. The team is organised by the Bulgarian Cricket Federation, which became an affiliate member of the International Cricket Council (ICC) in 2008 and an associate member in 2017. Bulgaria made its international debut in 2004, at the ECC Representative Championship in Slovenia. The majority of its matches since then have come against other European affiliate members of the ICC, including in several European Cricket Council (ECC) tournaments.

== History ==
=== Since 2018 ===
In April 2018, the ICC decided to grant full Twenty20 International (T20I) status to all its members. Therefore, all Twenty20 matches played between Bulgaria and other ICC members after 1 January 2019 have the T20I status.

Bulgaria played their first T20I on 14 October 2019, against Serbia, during the 2019 Hellenic Premier League. Bulgaria won by 6 wickets.

14 October 2019
14:30
Scorecard

Serbia; 156/6 (20 overs)	v	Bulgaria; 161/4 (18 overs)
Leslie Dunbar 104* (61); Prakash Mishra 3/12 (4 overs)		Kiran Dasan 74 (59); Apon Mustafizur 2/30 (3 overs)

Bulgaria won by 6 wickets
Marina Ground, Gouvia
Umpires: Ioannis Afthinos (Gre) and Ruban Sivanadian (Can)

- Serbia won the toss and elected to bat.

== Tournament history ==
=== European Cricket Championship ===
- 2009: 4th place (Division Five)

=== Euro Twenty-20 ===
- 2010: 3rd place

== Grounds ==
Locations of grounds which have hosted international cricket matches within Bulgaria

== Current squad ==
This lists all the players who have played for Bulgaria in the 2024 Continental Cup. Updated as of 26 May 2024.

Name	Age	Batting style	Bowling style	Notes
Batters
Zaid Soulat	25	Right-handed	Right-arm off break	
Manan Bashir	26	Right-handed	Right-arm off break	
Boiko Ivanov	46	Right-handed	Right-arm medium	
All-rounders
Prakash Mishra	26	Right-handed	Right-arm medium	Captain
Dimo Nikolov	33	Right-handed	Right-arm medium	
Isa Zaroo	26	Right-handed	Right-arm medium	
Zeerak Chugtai	33	Left-handed	Right-arm medium	
Firas Hussain	28	Right-handed	Right-arm off break	
Wicketkeepers
Saim Hussain	29	Left-handed		
Jacob Gul	24	Right-handed		
Bowlers
Danyal Raja	26	Right-handed	Right-arm medium	
Gagandeep Singh	32	Right-handed	Right-arm medium	
Milen Gogev	32	Right-handed	Right-arm medium	
Waleed Waqar	24	Right-handed	Right-arm medium	

== Records and statistics ==
International Match Summary — Bulgaria

Last updated 21 August 2026

Playing Record
Format	M	W	L	T	NR	Inaugural Match
Twenty20 Internationals	71	21	47	0	3	14 October 2019

=== Twenty20 International ===
- Highest team total: 246/4 v Serbia on 26 June 2022 at National Sports Academy, Sofia.
- Highest individual score: 108*, Saim Hussain v Malta on 14 May 2022 at Marsa Sports Club, Marsa.
- Best individual bowling figures: 5/16 (3.4 overs), Prakash Mishra v Croatia on 23 June 2023 at National Sports Academy, Sofia.

Most T20I runs for Bulgaria

Player	Runs	Average	Career span
Hristo Lakov	1,391	34.77	2019–2026
Aravinda De Silva	795	24.84	2020–2022
Kevin D'Souza	669	27.87	2020–2022
Milen Gogev	634	24.38	2024–2026
Isa Zaroo	605	23.26	2023–2026

Most T20I wickets for Bulgaria

Player	Wickets	Average	Career span
Prakash Mishra	62	26.01	2019–2026
Hristo Lakov	38	31.02	2019–2026
Jakob Gul	27	19.96	2024–2026
Zeerak Chughtai	21	17.66	2023–2025
Danyal Raja	20	31.30	2023–2026

T20I record versus other nations

Records complete to T20I #4094. Last updated 21 August 2026.

Opponent	M	W	L	T	NR	First match	First win
vs Associate Members
Austria	1	0	1	0	0	30 July 2022	
Croatia	1	1	0	0	0	23 June 2023	23 June 2023
Cyprus	4	0	4	0	0	2 November 2025	
Czech Republic	4	0	4	0	0	4 September 2021	
Estonia	1	0	1	0	0	24 August 2024	
Finland	2	0	2	0	0	27 August 2024	
Gibraltar	8	4	4	0	0	23 October 2021	24 October 2021
Greece	4	2	1	0	1	16 October 2019	18 October 2019
Guernsey	2	0	2	0	0	24 July 2022	
Hungary	1	0	1	0	0	11 May 2022	
Isle of Man	1	0	1	0	0	17 August 2026	
Luxembourg	3	1	2	0	0	2 September 2021	20 August 2026
Malta	7	0	6	0	1	23 September 2020	
Romania	13	1	12	0	0	16 October 2020	16 October 2020
Serbia	13	9	3	0	1	14 October 2019	14 October 2019
Slovenia	1	1	0	0	0	27 July 2022	27 July 2022
Spain	1	0	1	0	0	18 August 2026	
Switzerland	1	0	1	0	0	22 October 2021	
Turkey	3	2	1	0	0	24 June 2023	24 June 2023

== See also ==
- List of Bulgaria Twenty20 International cricketers
- Bulgaria women's national cricket team
