= Gouvia =

- Settlement
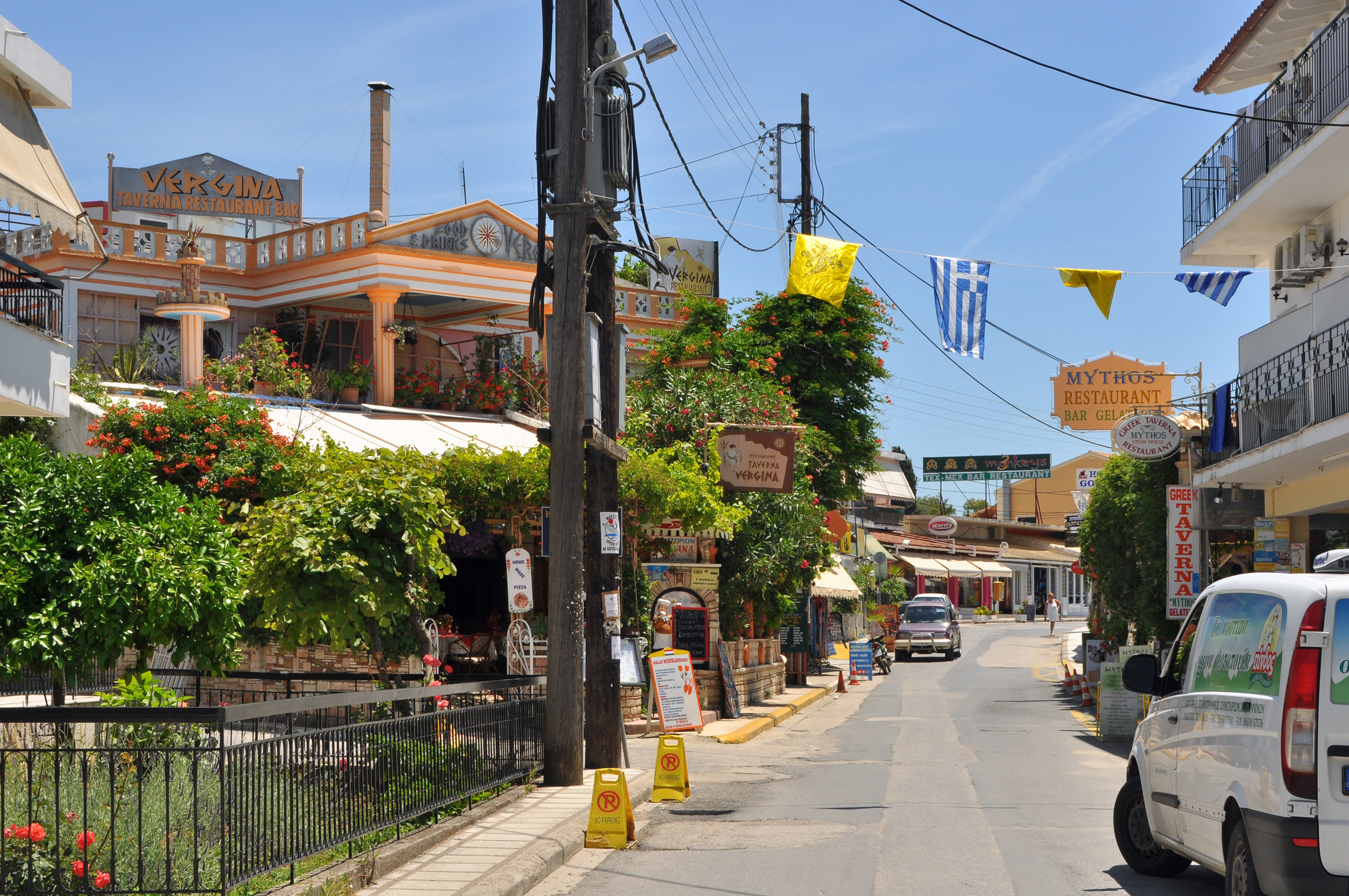
- A street in Gouvia with bars and restaurants to serve the tourist market

- Location within Greece
- Coordinates: 39°41′N 19°43′E
- Country: Greece
- Administrative region: Ionian Islands
- Regional unit: Corfu
- Municipality: Corfu
- Time zone: UTC+2 (EET)
  - Summer (DST): UTC+3 (EEST)
- Vehicle registration: ΚΥ

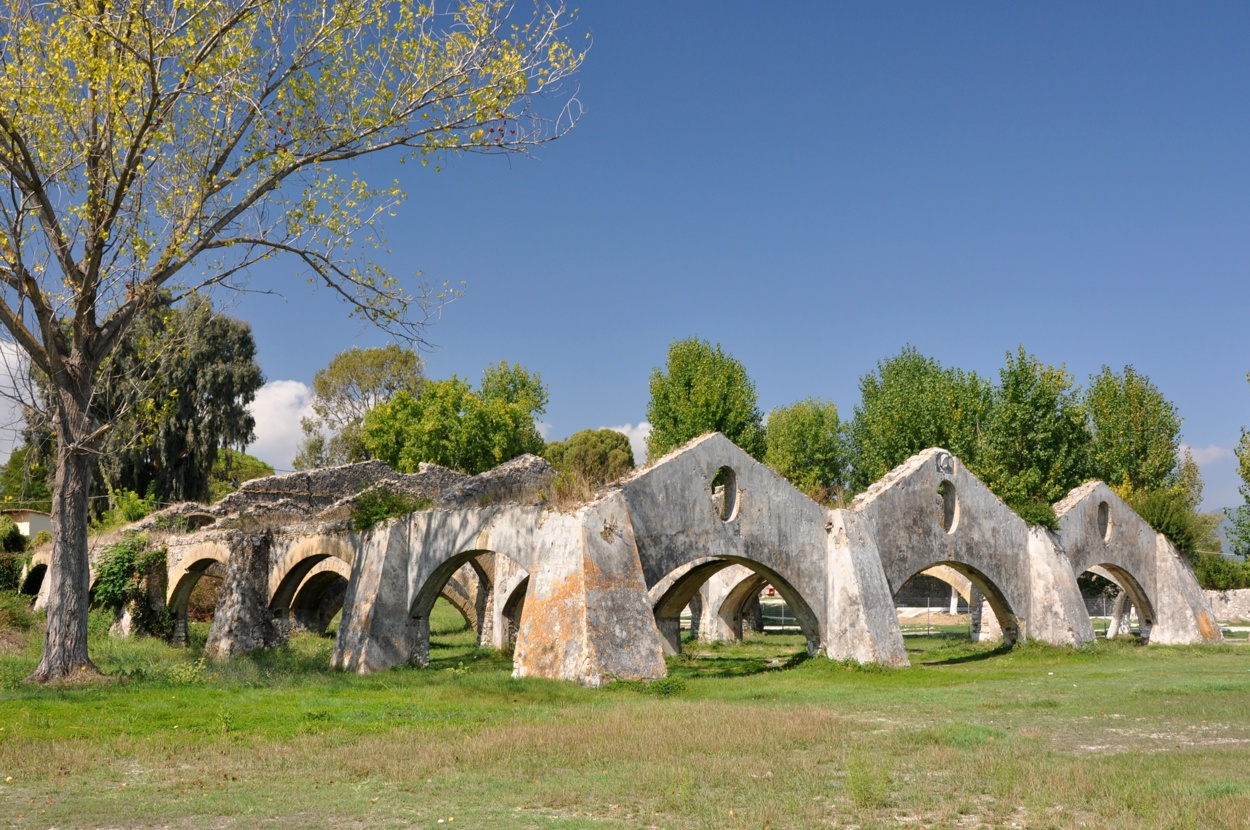
Venetian arsenal, Gouvia

Gouvia is a village and resort beside a natural harbour on Corfu, Greece. It is situated around 8 km (5 miles) North of Corfu town. It is separated from the Bay of Gouvia to the south by a headland on which is found the village of Kontókali.

Its location makes it an ideal site for the island's largest marina, and was also favoured during the Venetian occupation as evidenced by the well-preserved remains of a shipyard, referred to as the Venetian Arsenal in tourist literature.

The village is also famous for a Greek Orthodox church dedicated to the Hypapante jutting out into the bay from the village of Limni across the bay.

The main road to Corfu Town that cuts through the village is mostly bordered by supermarkets and dealerships, along with some large hotels. A smaller old street that skirts the marina, parallel to the main road, features a number of bars, restaurants and tavernas featuring local and foreign cuisines, along with some smaller hotels and self-catering apartments. Several larger resort complexes lie to the north.

The resort has a single, small pebble beach in the centre of the bay.
