= ICC Europe =

Cricket regional governing body for Europe

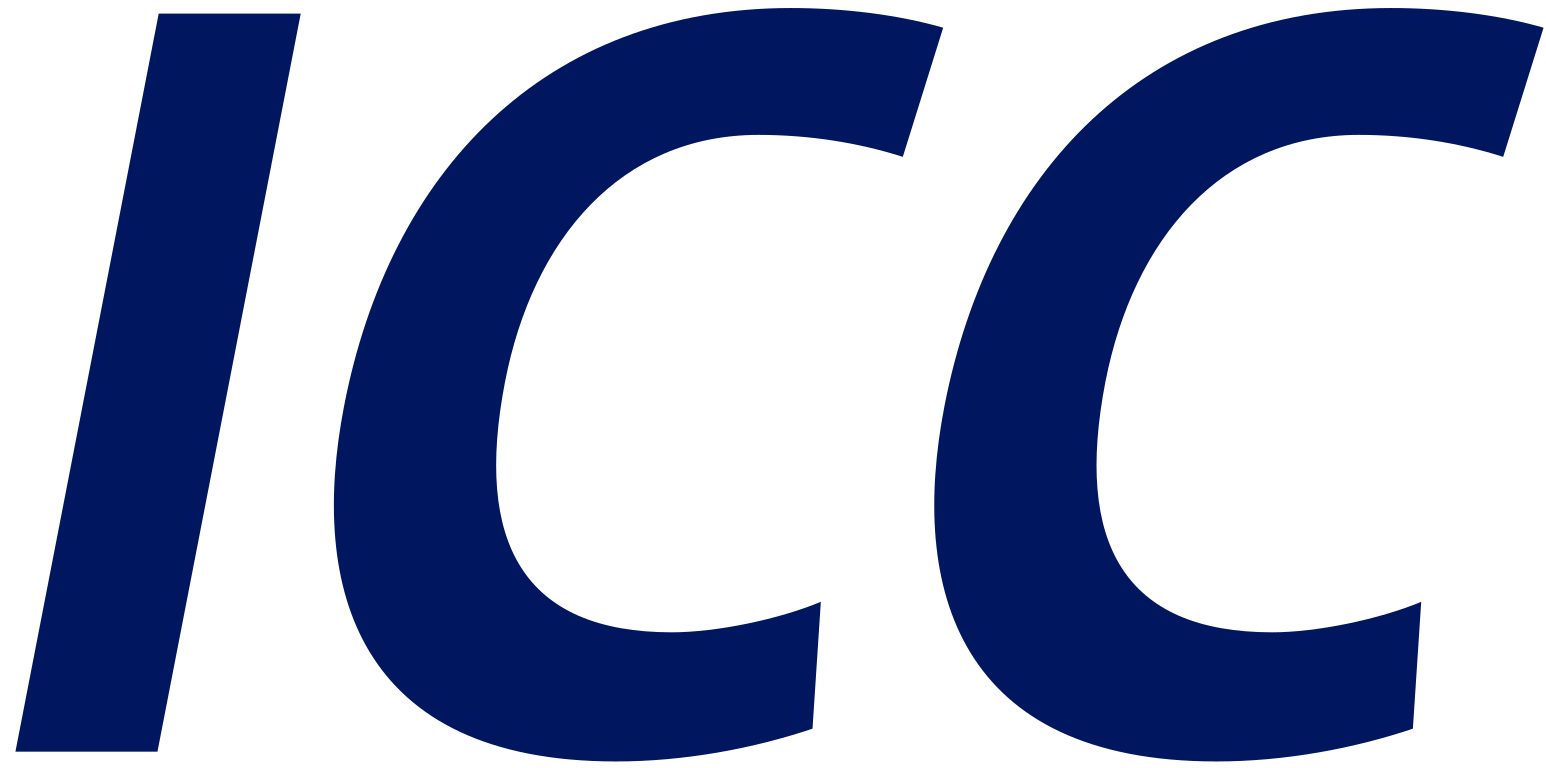
- Abbreviation: ICCE
- Formation: January 1, 2008; 18 years ago
- Purpose: Cricket administration
- Headquarters: London, England
- Region served: Europe
- Members: 34
- Official language: English
- Regional Development Manager: Andrew Wright
- Website: ICC_Europe

ICC Europe is the International Cricket Council region responsible for administration of the sport of cricket in most countries and territories in Europe. ICC Europe was established in 2008 to succeed the European Cricket Council and to promote and develop the sport of cricket within the continent. Subordinate to the International Cricket Council, the council serves as the region's continental administrative body and currently consists of 34 member associations. Andrew Wright is the current Regional Development Manager overseeing operations.

== History ==
The governance framework of European cricket shifted completely in 2008 when the International Cricket Council incorporated the independent, historical European Cricket Council (ECC, founded in 1997) directly into its global development network as ICC Europe. The legal entity of the older ECC was formally wound up and dissolved in 2010.

The council runs an extensive regional development program that supports coaching, umpiring, tournament infrastructure, and sports medicine programs across member countries, funded via development distributions allocated from global ICC events. Outside of traditional table qualifiers, the council runs high-performance exposure schemes. This includes a partnership with the Marylebone Cricket Club (MCC), where an all-star "ICC Europe XI" elite roster is compiled from standout players in minor European associates to fly into London and play exhibition fixtures on the historic outfield at Lord's Cricket Ground.

Following a comprehensive global membership restructure implemented by the ICC in 2017, the council completely abolished the historical "Affiliate" tier, transitioning all former affiliate sports bodies into Associate Members with T20I status.

== Members of ICC Europe ==
| No. | Country | Association | ICC Membership | ECC/ICCE Membership |
|---|---|---|---|---|
Full Members of ICC (2)
| 1 | England and Wales | England and Wales Cricket Board | 1909 | 1997 |
| 2 | Ireland | Cricket Ireland (Note: also represents Northern Ireland.) | 2017 (Note: Ireland became an associate member of the ICC in 1993, and was later promoted to a Full Member with Test status in 2017.) | 1997 |
Associate Members of ICC with ODI & T20I status (2)
| 3 | Netherlands | Royal Dutch Cricket Association | 1966 | 1997 |
| 4 | Scotland | Cricket Scotland | 1994 | 1997 |
Associate Members of ICC with T20I status (30)
| 5 | Austria | Austrian Cricket Association | 2017 | 1997 |
| 6 | Belgium | Belgian Cricket Federation | 2017 | 1997 |
| 7 | Bulgaria | Bulgarian Cricket Federation | 2017 | 2008 |
| 8 | Croatia | Croatian Cricket Federation | 2017 | 2001 |
| 9 | Cyprus | Cyprus Cricket Association | 2017 | 1999 |
| 10 | Czech Republic | Czech Cricket Union | 2017 | 2000 |
| 11 | Denmark | Danish Cricket Federation | 1966 | 1997 |
| 12 | Estonia | Estonian Cricket Association | 2017 | 1997 |
| 13 | Finland | Cricket Finland | 2017 | 2000 |
| 14 | France | France Cricket Association | 1998 | 1997 |
| 15 | Germany | German Cricket Federation | 1999 | 1997 |
| 16 | Gibraltar | Gibraltar Cricket Association | 1969 | 1997 |
| 17 | Greece | Hellenic Cricket Federation | 2017 | 1997 |
| 18 | Guernsey | Guernsey Cricket Board | 2008 | 2005 |
| 19 | Hungary | Hungarian Cricket Association | 2017 | 2012 |
| 20 | Isle of Man | Isle of Man Cricket Association | 2017 | 2004 |
| 21 | Israel | Israel Cricket Association | 1974 | 1997 |
| 22 | Italy | Italian Cricket Federation | 1995 | 1997 |
| 23 | Jersey | Jersey Cricket Board | 2007 | 2005 |
| 24 | Luxembourg | Luxembourg Cricket Federation | 2017 | 1998 |
| 25 | Malta | Malta Cricket Association | 2017 | 1998 |
| 26 | Norway | Norwegian Cricket Board | 2017 | 2000 |
| 27 | Portugal | Portuguese Cricket Federation | 2017 | 1997 |
| 28 | Romania | Cricket Romania | 2017 | 2013 |
| 29 | Serbia | Serbian Cricket Federation | 2017 | 2015 |
| 30 | Slovenia | Slovenian Cricket Association | 2017 | 2005 |
| 31 | Spain | Cricket Spain | 2017 | 1997 |
| 32 | Sweden | Swedish Cricket Federation | 2017 | 1997 |
| 33 | Switzerland | Cricket Switzerland | 1985 (Note: Switzerland was initially admitted in 1985, expelled in 2012 due to administrative compliance issues, and subsequently readmitted as a formal Associate Member in July 2021.) | 1997 |
| 34 | Turkey | Turkish Cricket Board | 2017 | 2008 |

=== Expelled members of ICC Europe ===
| No. | Country | Association | ICC Membership Status | ICC Membership | ICC Europe Membership Period |
|---|---|---|---|---|---|
| 1 | Russia | Cricket Russia | Suspended | 2012 | 2012–2022 (Note: Membership officially terminated by the global ICC board due to persistent administrative non-compliance and governance failures.) |

=== Future Members ===
| No. | Country | Association | ICC Membership period |
|---|---|---|---|
| 1 | Armenia | Cricket Armenia | —N/a |
| 2 | Iceland | Icelandic Cricket Association | —N/a |
| 3 | Latvia | Latvian Cricket Federation | —N/a |
| 4 | Lithuania | Lithuania Cricket Confederation | —N/a |
| 5 | Montenegro | Montenegro Cricket Association | —N/a |
| 6 | Poland | Cricket Poland | —N/a |
| 7 | Ukraine | Cricket Ukraine | —N/a |

== Map ==
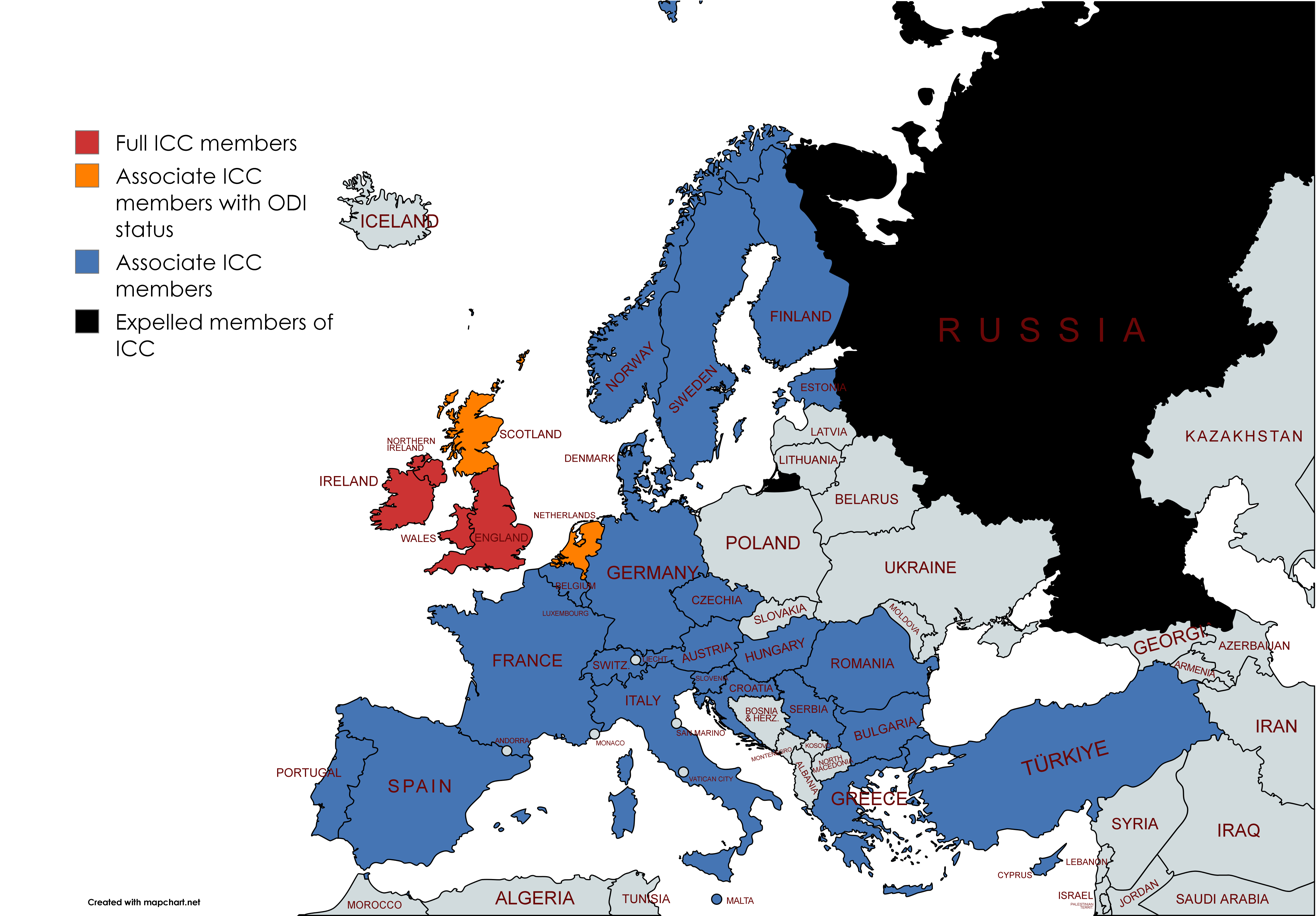
Members of the International Cricket Council located in Europe As of 14 November 2024 Full ICC members (2) Associate ICC members with ODI status (2) Associate ICC members (29) Expelled members (1) Non-members

== Competitions ==
| Tournament | Recent | Current champions | Runners-up | Next |
Men's
| ICC Men's T20 World Cup Europe Qualifier | 2025 | Netherlands | Italy | 2027 |
| European Qualifier A | 2024 | Italy | Romania | 2026 |
| European Qualifier B | 2024 | Jersey | Norway | 2026 |
| European Qualifier C | 2024 | Guernsey | Denmark | 2026 |
| U19 Cricket World Cup Europe Qualifier Div 1 | 2025 | Scotland | Netherlands | 2027 |
| U19 Cricket World Cup Europe Qualifier Div 2 | 2024 | Netherlands | Sweden | 2026 |
Women's
| T20 World Cup Europe Qualifier Div 1 | 2025 | Ireland | Netherlands | 2027 |
| T20 World Cup Europe Qualifier Div 2 | 2025 | Italy | Germany | 2027 |

=== Defunct and Transferred events ===
- European Cricket Championship (Historical 50-over variants run by the ECC; currently independent commercial T10 tournaments run by the European Cricket Network mimic the naming standard)
- European Affiliates Championship (Discontinued post-2017 Restructure)
- European Twenty20 Championship (Cancelled)

== Officials ==
=== Executive Administration ===
ICC Europe Administrative Officials
| Name | Council/Board | Post |
|---|---|---|
| Andrew Wright | ICC | Regional Development Manager |
| Richard Holdsworth | Cricket Ireland | Performance & Pathway Representative |
| Shane McDermott | Cricket Scotland | High-Performance Pathway Officer |

== Development team ==
=== ICC Europe Selection Panel (Exhibitions) ===
ICC Europe XI Selection Panel
| Andrew Wright | ICC | Chairman of Selectors |
| Toby Bailey | Cricket Scotland | Member / Head Scout |
| Chris Tetley | ICC | Ex-Officio; Head of Global Events |

== See also ==
- International Cricket Council
- Asian Cricket Council
- Africa Cricket Association
- European Cricket Council
- ICC Americas
- ICC East Asia-Pacific
