= 2022 Valletta Cup =

International cricket tournament

- Dates: 10 – 15 May 2022
- Administrator: Malta Cricket Association
- Cricket format: Twenty20 International
- Tournament format(s): Round-robin and final
- Host: Malta
- Champions: Romania
- Runners-up: Malta
- Participants: 6
- Matches: 18
- Player of the series: (Romania) Taranjeet Singh
- Most runs: (Romania) Taranjeet Singh (357)
- Most wickets: (Romania) Ijaz Hussain (11)

The 2022 Valletta Cup was a Twenty20 International (T20I) cricket tournament held in Malta between 10 and 15 May 2022. It was the third edition of the Valletta Cup. The venue for the series was the Marsa Sports Club in Marsa. The participating teams were the hosts Malta along with Bulgaria, Czech Republic, Gibraltar, Hungary and Romania. Malta were the defending champions having defeated Switzerland in the final of the 2021 edition. Bulgaria and Gibraltar returned after finishing the 2021 tournament in third and fourth places, respectively. The Czech Republic and Hungary last featured in the 2019 Valletta Cup, in which the Czechs beat a Hungary XI in the final.

In a round-robin game against Bulgaria, Gibraltar put on an unbeaten 213 runs for the first wicket, the fourth highest opening partnerships in men's T20Is. Malta secured a place in the final on day three with a game to spare, after winning their first four matches. Romania reached the final after a rapid run-chase against Gibraltar, and they went on to defeat the hosts by 9 runs in the final.

== Squads ==
Bulgaria	Czech Republic	Gibraltar	Hungary	Malta	Romania
Prakash Mishra (c); Jacob Albin; Kevin D'Souza; Aravinda De Silva; Vasil Hristov; Saim Hussain (wk); Ivaylo Katzarski; Ahsan Khan; Hristo Lakov; Sandeep Nair; Dimo Nikolov; Karthik Pillai; Omar Rassol (wk); Asad Ali Rehemtulla; Delrick Varghese	Arun Ashokan (c); Naveed Ahmed; Sazib Bhuiyan; Shubhranshu Chaudhary; Sabawoon Davizi; Vyshakh Jagannivasan; Smit Patel; Sharan Ramakrishnan; Satyajit Sengupta; Divyendra Singh (wk); Dylan Steyn; Ritik Tomar; Sudesh Wickramasekara	Avinash Pai (c); Kieron Ferrary (vc); Nikhil Advani; Samarth Bodha; Louis Bruce; Richard Cunningham; Mark Garratt; Mark Gouws; Richard Hatchman; Joseph Marples (wk); Kenroy Nestor; Robin Petrie; Andrew Reyes; Christian Rocca; Zachary Simpson; Matthew Whelan	Abhijeet Ahuja (c); Bhavani Adapaka; Abhishek Ahuja (wk); Satyadeep Ashwathnarayana (wk); Khaibar Deldar; Ali Farasat; Mark Fontaine; Abishek Kheterpal; Akramullah Malikzada; Harshvardhan Mandhyan; Zahir Mohammed; Sandeep Mohandas; Gabor Torok; Asanka Weligamage	Bikram Arora (c); Amar Sharma (vc); Waseem Abbas; Imran Ameer; Gopal Chaturvedi; Basil George; Heinrich Gericke (wk); Jaison Jerome; Aaftab Alam Khan (wk); Zeeshan Khan; Niraj Khanna; Divyes Kumar; Bilal Muhammad; Jitesh Patel; Justin Shaju; Samuel Stanislaus; Varun Thamotharam	Ramesh Satheesan (c); Mihai Achim; Arun Chandrasekaran; Marian Gherasim; Ijaz Hussain; Senthilvel Karthikeyan; Aftab Kayani; Rajesh Kumar; Gaurav Mishra; Muhammad Moiz; Satvik Nadigotla (wk); Sivakumar Periyalwar; Rajendra Pisal; Sukhkaran Sahi; Vasu Saini; Abdul Shakoor (wk); Taranjeet Singh; Cosmin Zavoiu

The Czech Republic also named Kranthi Venkataswamy and Neeraj Tyagi as reserves.

== Round-robin ==
=== Points table ===
Pos	Team	Pld	W	L	NR	Pts	NRR
1	Malta	5	5	0	0	10	1.014
2	Romania	5	3	2	0	6	1.498
3	Czech Republic	5	3	2	0	6	1.237
4	Hungary	5	3	2	0	6	−0.251
5	Gibraltar	5	1	4	0	2	−1.439
6	Bulgaria	5	0	5	0	0	−2.115

Source: ESPNcricinfo
- Advanced to the final
- Advanced to the third-place play-off
- Advanced to the fifth-place play-off

=== Fixtures ===
10 May 2022
08:30
Scorecard

Gibraltar; 132/6 (20 overs)	v	Malta; 135/5 (16.5 overs)
Avinash Pai 42 (39); Amar Sharma 2/24 (4 overs)		Basil George 36 (30); Zachary Simpson 2/32 (2.5 overs)

Malta won by 5 wickets
Marsa Sports Club, Marsa
Umpires: Shubh Anand (Hun) and Sandeep Harnal (Can)
Player of the match: Basil George (Mlt)

- Malta won the toss and elected to field.
- Jaison Jerome (Mlt), Samarth Bodha, Mark Gouws, Zachary Simpson and Matthew Whelan (Gib) all made their T20I debuts.

10 May 2022
12:15
Scorecard

Malta; 206/7 (20 overs)	v	Hungary; 161/6 (20 overs)
Basil George 60 (36); Asanka Weligamage 3/45 (4 overs)		Harshvardhan Mandhyan 41 (25); Waseem Abbas 2/25 (4 overs)

Malta won by 45 runs
Marsa Sports Club, Marsa
Umpires: Sandeep Harnal (Can) and Ruban Sivanadian (Mlt)
Player of the match: Bikram Arora (Mlt)

- Hungary won the toss and elected to field.
- Bhavani Adapaka, Abhishek Ahuja, Ali Farasat and Akramullah Malikzada (Hun) all made their T20I debuts.

10 May 2022
15:45
Scorecard

Gibraltar; 137/8 (20 overs)	v	Hungary; 138/6 (18.4 overs)
Kieron Ferrary 24 (22); Sandeep Mohandas 2/31 (4 overs)		Harshvardhan Mandhyan 29 (27); Samarth Bodha 3/26 (3.4 overs)

Hungary won by 4 wickets
Marsa Sports Club, Marsa
Umpires: Shubh Anand (Hun) and Tim Wheeler (Mlt)
Player of the match: Harshvardhan Mandhyan (Hun)

- Hungary won the toss and elected to field.

11 May 2022
08:30
Scorecard

Romania; 165/4 (20 overs)	v	Malta; 166/5 (19.3 overs)
Taranjeet Singh 63 (44); Amar Sharma 1/33 (4 overs)		Basil George 37 (22); Ijaz Hussain 2/25 (3 overs)

Malta won by 5 wickets
Marsa Sports Club, Marsa
Umpires: Shubh Anand (Hun) and Ruban Sivanadian (Mlt)
Player of the match: Basil George (Mlt)

- Malta won the toss and elected to field.
- Gaurav Mishra and Sukhkaran Sahi (Rom) both made their T20I debuts.

11 May 2022
12:00
Scorecard

Czech Republic; 184/5 (20 overs)	v	Gibraltar; 144/8 (20 overs)
Sabawoon Davizi 98* (61); Kieron Ferrary 1/9 (3 overs)		Andrew Reyes 44 (41); Sazib Bhuiyan 2/20 (3 overs)

Czech Republic won by 40 runs
Marsa Sports Club, Marsa
Umpires: Shubh Anand (Hun) and Andrew Naudi (Mlt)
Player of the match: Sabawoon Davizi (Cze)

- Czech Republic won the toss and elected to bat.
- Sazib Bhuiyan, Shubhranshu Chaudhary, Divyendra Singh, Dylan Steyn and Ritik Tomar (Cze) all made their T20I debuts.

11 May 2022
15:30
Scorecard

Hungary; 158/8 (20 overs)	v	Bulgaria; 153/9 (20 overs)
Abishek Kheterpal 42 (35); Hristo Lakov 2/15 (4 overs)		Saim Hussain 54 (43); Bhavani Adapaka 3/29 (4 overs)

Hungary won by 5 runs
Marsa Sports Club, Marsa
Umpires: Sandeep Harnal (Can) and Ruban Sivanadian (Mlt)
Player of the match: Abishek Kheterpal (Hun)

- Bulgaria won the toss and elected to field.
- Saim Hussain, Sandeep Nair (Bul) and Gabor Torok (Hun) all made their T20I debuts.

12 May 2022
08:30
Scorecard

Malta; 164/8 (20 overs)	v	Czech Republic; 162/9 (20 overs)
Basil George 51 (41); Satyajit Sengupta 3/35 (4 overs)		Arun Ashokan 30 (17); Amar Sharma 3/24 (3 overs)

Malta won by 2 runs
Marsa Sports Club, Marsa
Umpires: Shubh Anand (Hun) and Sandeep Harnal (Can)
Player of the match: Basil George (Mlt)

- Czech Republic won the toss and elected to field.
- Imran Ameer (Mlt) and Sharan Ramakrishnan (Cze) both made their T20I debuts.

12 May 2022
12:00
Scorecard

Czech Republic; 258/2 (20 overs)	v	Bulgaria; 170/7 (20 overs)
Sabawoon Davizi 115* (59); Hristo Lakov 2/49 (4 overs)		Hristo Lakov 61 (51); Naveed Ahmed 3/29 (4 overs)

Czech Republic won by 88 runs
Marsa Sports Club, Marsa
Umpires: Andrew Naudi (Mlt) and Ruban Sivanadian (Mlt)
Player of the match: Sabawoon Davizi (Cze)

- Czech Republic won the toss and elected to bat.
- Dylan Steyn (Cze) scored his first century in T20Is.

12 May 2022
15:30
Scorecard

Romania; 158/7 (20 overs)	v	Hungary; 162/4 (17.3 overs)
Vasu Saini 47 (32); Harshvardhan Mandhyan 3/30 (4 overs)		Zahir Mohammed 78 (42); Ijaz Hussain 2/16 (3 overs)

Hungary won by 6 wickets
Marsa Sports Club, Marsa
Umpires: Shubh Anand (Hun) and Andrew Naudi (Mlt)
Player of the match: Zahir Mohammed (Hun)

- Romania won the toss and elected to bat.

13 May 2022
08:30
Scorecard

Gibraltar; 213/0 (20 overs)	v	Bulgaria; 192/6 (20 overs)
Louis Bruce 99* (63)		Saim Hussain 64 (31); Samarth Bodha 2/18 (3 overs)

Gibraltar won by 21 runs
Marsa Sports Club, Marsa
Umpires: Shubh Anand (Hun) and Ruban Sivanadian (Mlt)
Player of the match: Louis Bruce (Gib)

- Gibraltar won the toss and elected to bat.
- Karthik Pillai (Bul) and Christian Rocca (Gib) both made their T20I debuts.
- The opening partnership for Gibraltar between Avinash Pai and Louis Bruce was the first time that a team had batted a full 20 overs without losing a wicket in a men's T20I.

13 May 2022
12:00
Scorecard

Romania; 193/4 (20 overs)	v	Czech Republic; 167/9 (20 overs)
Taranjeet Singh 110 (61); Naveed Ahmed 2/34 (4 overs)		Arun Ashokan 49 (40); Ijaz Hussain 4/28 (4 overs)

Romania won by 26 runs
Marsa Sports Club, Marsa
Umpires: Sandeep Harnal (Can) and Tim Wheeler (Mlt)
Player of the match: Taranjeet Singh (Rom)

- Romania won the toss and elected to bat.
- Taranjeet Singh (Rom) scored his first century in T20Is.

13 May 2022
15:30
Scorecard

Bulgaria; 131/7 (20 overs)	v	Romania; 132/2 (12.4 overs)
Kevin D'Souza 43 (33); Ijaz Hussain 2/22 (4 overs)		Ramesh Satheesan 86* (43); Delrick Varghese 1/7 (0.4 overs)

Romania won by 8 wickets
Marsa Sports Club, Marsa
Umpires: Shubh Anand (Hun) and Ruban Sivanadian (Mlt)
Player of the match: Ramesh Satheesan (Rom)

- Bulgaria won the toss and elected to bat.
- Senthilvel Karthikeyan (Rom) made his T20I debut.

14 May 2022
08:30
Scorecard

Hungary; 169/7 (20 overs)	v	Czech Republic; 175/3 (18.1 overs)
Abhishek Ahuja 61 (48); Smit Patel 4/34 (4 overs)		Sudesh Wickramasekara 63 (41); Bhavani Adapaka 1/38 (3.1 overs)

Czech Republic won by 7 wickets
Marsa Sports Club, Marsa
Umpires: Sandeep Harnal (Can) and Tim Wheeler (Mlt)
Player of the match: Arun Ashokan (Cze)

- Hungary won the toss and elected to bat.

14 May 2022
12:00
Scorecard

Gibraltar; 141 (19.5 overs)	v	Romania; 142/2 (11.2 overs)
Avinash Pai 49 (40); Ramesh Satheesan 3/37 (3 overs)		Taranjeet Singh 84* (35); Richard Cunningham 1/28 (2.2 overs)

Romania won by 8 wickets
Marsa Sports Club, Marsa
Umpires: Ghose Roy (Mlt) and Ruban Sivanadian (Mlt)
Player of the match: Ramesh Satheesan (Rom)

- Gibraltar won the toss and elected to bat.

14 May 2022
15:30
Scorecard

Bulgaria; 204/4 (20 overs)	v	Malta; 205/4 (18.2 overs)
Saim Hussain 108* (55); Imran Ameer 2/41 (4 overs)		Aaftab Alam Khan 71* (38); Hristo Lakov 2/44 (4 overs)

Malta won by 6 wickets
Marsa Sports Club, Marsa
Umpires: Shubh Anand (Hun) and Sandeep Harnal (Can)
Player of the match: Saim Hussain (Bul)

- Bulgaria won the toss and elected to bat.
- Divyes Kumar and Jitesh Patel (Mlt) both made their T20I debuts.
- Saim Hussain (Bul) scored his first century in T20Is.

== Fifth-place play-off ==
15 May 2022
09:00
Scorecard

Gibraltar; 170/6 (20 overs)	v	Bulgaria; 171/5 (19.5 overs)
Balaji Pai 53* (44); Asad Ali Rehemtulla 2/25 (4 overs)		Aravinda De Silva 41 (32); Kieron Ferrary 2/30 (4 overs)

Bulgaria won by 5 wickets
Marsa Sports Club, Marsa
Umpires: Shubh Anand (Hun) and Ghose Roy (Mlt)
Player of the match: Kevin D'Souza (Bul)

- Gibraltar won the toss and elected to bat.

== Third-place play-off ==
15 May 2022
12:30
Scorecard

Czech Republic; 221/5 (20 overs)	v	Hungary; 151/6 (20 overs)
Dylan Steyn 65 (41); Bhavani Adapaka 1/26 (3 overs)		Abhijeet Ahuja 75 (52); Sazib Bhuiyan 2/29 (4 overs)

Czech Republic won by 70 runs
Marsa Sports Club, Marsa
Umpires: Ghose Roy (Mlt) and Tim Wheeler (Mlt)
Player of the match: Dylan Steyn (Cze)

- Hungary won the toss and elected to field.

== Final ==
15 May 2022
16:30
Scorecard

Romania; 171/6 (20 overs)	v	Malta; 162/7 (20 overs)
Vasu Saini 60* (42); Waseem Abbas 2/35 (4 overs)		Imran Ameer 28* (23); Taranjeet Singh 4/20 (4 overs)

Romania won by 9 runs
Marsa Sports Club, Marsa
Umpires: Shubh Anand (Hun) and Sandeep Harnal (Can)
Player of the match: Taranjeet Singh (Rom)

- Romania won the toss and elected to bat.
