= 2012 Europe Twenty20 Division Three =

2012 ICC European T20 Championship Division Three
- Administrator: International Cricket Council
- Cricket format: Twenty20
- Tournament format: Round-robin
- Host: Estonia
- Champions: Estonia (1st title)
- Participants: 3
- Matches: 6
- Player of the series: (Estonia) Tim Heath
- Most runs: (Estonia) Tim Heath (182)
- Most wickets: (Estonia) Murali Obili (9)
- Official website: ICC European Championship

The 2012 ICC European Twenty20 Championship Division Three is a cricket tournament that took place between 14 and 16 June 2012. It forms part of the European Cricket Championship. Estonia hosted the event.

== Teams ==
Teams that qualified are as follows:

- Bulgaria
- Estonia
- Slovenia

== Squads ==
| Bulgaria | Estonia | Slovenia |
|---|---|---|
| Saif-ur Rehman (c); Stuart Clarkson; Ivaylo Dunchev; Blagovest Itsev; Amal John; Ivaylo Katzarski; Prakash Mishra; Alexandar Pashov; Yasen Petrov; Matthew Stewart; Danail Trenev; Lyubomir Zanev (wk) | Tim Heath (C); Sivalingam Arunachalam; Vineeth Govind; Murali Obili; Moshiur Rahman; Remo Raud; Nand Lal Riar; Mart Tammoja; Mario Tammoja; Michael Tiffin; Marko Vaik (wk); Peter van Buuren; Kalle Vislapuu | Mark Oman (c); Christopher Bishop; Domen Bohinc; Rok Bohinc (wk); Grega Bohinc; Matthew Charlesworth; Robert Crawford; Bradley Eve; Thomas Furness; Lalantha Karunatilake; Simon Kaucic; Primoz Pustoslemsek; Nilesh Ujawe |

== Fixtures ==
=== Group stage ===
==== Points table ====
| Team | P | W | L | T | NR | Points | NRR |
|---|---|---|---|---|---|---|---|
| Estonia | 4 | 3 | 1 | 0 | 0 | 6 | +1.425 |
| Slovenia | 4 | 2 | 2 | 0 | 0 | 4 | -0.275 |
| Bulgaria | 4 | 1 | 3 | 0 | 0 | 2 | -1.169 |

| Teams that qualified for 2012 Europe Division Two. |

==== Matches ====
14 June
Scorecard

| Bulgaria; 105 (19.5 overs) | v | Estonia; 106/4 (15.4 overs) |
| Danail Trenev 19 (25); Murali Obili 3/8 (3.5 overs) | | Nand Lal Riar 24 (24); Amal John 2/20 (2 overs) |

Estonia won by 6 wickets
Tallinn Hippodrome, Tallinn
Umpires: Roland Black (Ire) and Michael Ross (Ire)

- Estonia won the toss and elected to field.

14 June
Scorecard

| Estonia; 170/6 (20 overs) | v | Slovenia; 105 (16.5 overs) |
| Murali Obili 76* (33); Domen Bohinc 3/38 (4 overs) | | Mark Oman 25 (41); Moshiur Rahman 5/14 (3 overs) |

Estonia won by 65 runs
Tallinn Hippodrome, Tallinn
Umpires: Roland Black (Ire) and Noel McCarey (Ire)

- Estonia won the toss and elected to bat.

15 June
Scorecard

| Slovenia; 153/5 (20 overs) | v | Bulgaria; 117/9 (20 overs) |
| Mark Oman 49 (45); Prakash Mishra 2/31 (4 overs) | | Danail Trenev 44 (39); Primoz Pustoslemsek 3/22 (3 overs) |

Slovenia won by 36 runs
Tallinn Hippodrome, Tallinn
Umpires: Noel McCarey (Ire) and Michael Ross (Ire)

- Slovenia won the toss and elected to bat.

15 June
Scorecard

| Estonia; 143/7 (20 overs) | v | Slovenia; 119/9 (20 overs) |
| Moshiur Rahman 43 (48); Domen Bohinc 3/31 (4 overs) | | Mark Oman 39 (54); Nand Lal Riar 4/22 (4 overs) |

Estonia won by 24 runs
Tallinn Hippodrome, Tallinn
Umpires: Roland Black (Ire) and Michael Ross (Ire)

- Estonia won the toss and elected to bat.

16 June
Scorecard

| Slovenia; 197/3 (20 overs) | v | Bulgaria; 166/2 (20 overs) |
| Christopher Bishop 58 (20); Prakash Mishra 1/28 (4 overs) | | Matthew Stewart 61* (51); Primoz Pustoslemsek 1/29 (4 overs) |

Slovenia won by 31 runs
Tallinn Hippodrome, Tallinn
Umpires: Roland Black (Ire) and Noel McCarey (Ire)

- Slovenia won the toss and elected to bat.

16 June
Scorecard

| Estonia; 161/5 (20 overs) | v | Bulgaria; 165/2 (19.1 overs) |
| Tim Heath 88* (43); Prakash Mishra 2/16 (4 overs) | | Matthew Stewart 66 (45); Murali Obili 2/26 (4 overs) |

Bulgaria won by 8 wickets
Tallinn Hippodrome, Tallinn
Umpires: Noel McCarey (Ire) and Michael Ross (Ire)

- Estonia won the toss and elected to bat.
- Estonia won the 2012 ICC European T20 Championship Division Three as a result of this match.

== Statistics ==
=== Most Runs ===
The top five run scorers (total runs) are included in this table.

| Player | Team | Runs | Inns | Avg | S/R | HS | 100s | 50s |
|---|---|---|---|---|---|---|---|---|
| Tim Heath | Estonia | 182 | 4 | 60.66 | 180.19 | 88* | 0 | 1 |
| Matthew Stewart | Bulgaria | 147 | 4 | 49.00 | 120.49 | 66 | 0 | 2 |
| Mark Oman | Slovenia | 146 | 4 | 48.66 | 80.21 | 49 | 0 | 0 |
| Danail Trenev | Bulgaria | 135 | 4 | 45.00 | 99.26 | 59* | 0 | 1 |
| Murali Obili | Estonia | 104 | 4 | 34.66 | 165.07 | 63 | 0 | 1 |

=== Most Wickets ===
The top five wicket takers (total wickets) are listed in this table.

| Player | Team | Wkts | Mts | Ave | S/R | Econ | BBI |
|---|---|---|---|---|---|---|---|
| Murali Obili | Estonia | 9 | 4 | 8.66 | 9.8 | 5.25 | 3/8 |
| Moshiur Rahman | Estonia | 7 | 3 | 6.85 | 6.8 | 6.00 | 5/14 |
| Prakash Mishra | Bulgaria | 6 | 4 | 14.50 | 16.0 | 5.43 | 2/16 |
| Domen Bohinc | Slovenia | 6 | 4 | 20.00 | 12.0 | 10.00 | 3/31 |
| Primoz Pustoslemsek | Slovenia | 5 | 4 | 20.80 | 9.2 | 6.50 | 3/22 |

== See also ==
- 2013 ICC World Twenty20 Qualifier
- European Cricket Championship
