= Croatia national cricket team =

Cricket team

Croatia
- Association: Croatian Cricket Federation

Personnel
- Coach: Darren Maddy

International Cricket Council
- ICC status: Associate member (2017)
- ICC region: Europe
| ICC Rankings | Current | Best-ever |
| T20I | 87th | 79th (25 June 2023) |

International cricket
- First international: v. Finland at Seebarn, Austria; 21 August 2000

T20 Internationals
- First T20I: v. Sweden at Kerava National Cricket Ground, Kerava; 13 July 2022
- Last T20I: v. Austria at Happy Valley Ground 2, Episkopi; 23 May 2026
| T20Is | Played | Won/Lost |
| Total | 37 | 6/30 (0 ties, 1 no result) |
| This year | 5 | 2/3 (0 ties, 0 no results) |
T20I kit
- As of 26 May 2026

The Croatia national cricket team is the team that represents Croatia in international cricket. The team is organised by the Croatian Cricket Federation, which became an affiliate member of the International Cricket Council (ICC) in 2001 and an associate member in 2017. Croatia made its international debut at the 2000 ECC Representative Festival in Austria. It has since regularly played in the lower levels of European Cricket Council tournaments, as well as in various other series against European sides.

In April 2018, the ICC decided to grant full Twenty20 International (T20I) status to all its members. Therefore, all Twenty20 matches played between Croatia and other ICC members after 1 January 2019 have the T20I status.

== History ==
=== 2000—2009 ===
Croatia have been a regular participant in the European Cricket Council's various tournaments, starting in 2000 with the ECC Representative Championships, the fourth tier of European competition. They finished as runners up to Norway in that tournament. They hosted the same tournament two years later, where they finished third behind Finland and Slovenia, but then won the 2004 tournament.

==== ICC Europe one-day tournaments ====
They also competed in the ECC Trophy in 2001, 2003 but failed to achieve results they were capable of and finished just off the bottom of the ladder on both occasions.

In 2004 ICC Europe reorganised its competition structure, creating four divisions – of which Croatia fell into Division 4. The team made a clean sweep of the ICC Europe Division 4 Championship held that year in Ljubljana, Slovenia, beating the hosts Slovenia, newcomers Bulgaria and old rivals in Switzerland, Luxembourg and Finland. Victory meant automatic promotion to Division 3.

The team's first appearance in the 9-team Division 3, held in Belgium in August 2005, was successful from the point of view that they managed to finish in 7th place and thereby avoid the two bottom two places which meant automatic relegation back to the lower division whence they came, as ICC Europe restructured its competitions again, this time creating 5 divisions of six nations each, European Championship. The team returned to Belgium in 2007 for another crack at Division 3. This time they were better prepared and organised, and despite a number of injuries went through the tournament undefeated after narrowly beating Spain (by 4 runs) in a thrilling final – to earn the right to play against Israel for a place in the dizzy heights of Division 2.

In another close finish the team beat Israel by 5 runs in Tel Aviv in November to earn a spot in Division 2, which was played in Guernsey in 2008. The step-up in standard of the higher division proved a little too much and the team left the island without a victory in the competition, and the prospect of another play-off match to avoid relegation back to Division 3.

Croatia narrowly defeated Israel by 5 runs in Tel Aviv in November 2007 in a play-off match for the sixth place in the European Division 2 Championship. This match shall be recorded in history as the first official international cricket match played in Israel since the formation of the modern Israeli state.

In October 2009 Croatia and Israel met again for a play-off match to decide who will fill the sixth spot in the ICC Europe Division 2 Championship to be played in 2010. Israel ran out comfortable winners in a rain-affected match played in Zagreb. Croatia now returns to ICC Europe Division 3, and will take part in the championship in 2011.

==== ICC Europe Twenty20 competitions ====
The Croatian Cricket Federation also sent a representative side (Croatia 'A') to take part in the 2008 Euro Twenty-20 tournament held by Carmel & District Cricket Club in North Wales. Croatia recorded victories over Slovakia and Carmel but lost in the semi-finals to eventual winners Estonia, to finish in fourth spot.

The Croatia 'A' team returned to Carmel in July 2009 for the second edition of the Euro Twenty-20 tournament. This time team beat Bulgaria but lost to the Isle of Alderney and Russia in the group stage to be relegated to the 'Plate' competition. Victories against Hungary in the semi-final and New Victoria CC in the Plate final gave the team its first silverware. Croatia A's Nikola Davidović was also named the bowler of the tournament.

Croatia 'A' played a friendly match against Ireland 'A' in Dublin on 19 July 2009. Ireland ran out comfortable winners by 133 runs.

==== MCC Tour of August 2009 ====
The MCC toured Croatia from 2 August until 7 August, the first match commencing on 3 August between a Croatian Development XI and the MCC (Limited Overs), the match was a 75 run win to the visitors (MCC 8/280 v Croatia 5/205), a notable performance by C.Sinovich scoring 116 with the bat and taking 1 for 53 off 7 overs. The second match, on 4 August, was between the MCC and Croatian Presidents XI (Twenty20), the result was a dismal performance by the Croatian team, losing the match by 127 runs (MCC 2/264 v Croatia 5/137), R Turner top scoring for the visitors with 179, putting together a partnership with M.Marvell of 251 for the second wicket. V. Sharma was the only notable performer for Croatia with figures of 1 for 22 off 4 overs. For the fourth match of the series (played on 5 August), the MCC played a Croatian national team (Limited Overs) who made 9/187 off their allotted overs, but losing by 6 wickets, MCC reaching 4/188 off 27.3 overs. C.Wear top scoring for the locals with 62 (second highest for the match behind T.Hicks with 84). The fifth and final game was played on 6 August, with a Sir William Hoste XI playing the visitors (twenty20 format). With the hosts being held to 7/81 off their allotted overs, an easy win to the MCC making 2/82 with 10.3 overs remaining. All matches being played in Vis on an artificial surface.

== Tournament history ==
Legend

- Champions
- Runners-up
- Third place/Semi-finals
- Tournament hosted by Italy
- Q Qualified
- DNQ Did not qualify
- A Advanced to the next stage
- ▲ Promoted
- Remained in the same division
- ▼ Relegated

=== T20 World Cup Europe Sub-regional Qualifiers ===
T20 World Cup Europe Sub-regional Qualifiers records
| Host/Year | Round | Position | GP | W | L | T | NR |
|---|---|---|---|---|---|---|---|
| (Netherlands) 2019 | Did not participate | | | | | | |
| (Finland) 2023 | Round-robin (DNQ) | 7/10 | 5 | 2 | 3 | 0 | 0 |
| (Germany) 2024 | Round-robin (DNQ) | 4/10 | 5 | 2 | 2 | 0 | 1 |
| (Cyprus) 2026 | Round-robin (DNQ) | 6/10 | 5 | 2 | 3 | 0 | 0 |
| Total | 3/4 | 0 Titles | 15 | 6 | 8 | 0 | 1 |

=== European Cricket Championship ===
European Cricket Championship records
| Host/Year | Division | Round | Position | GP | W | L | T | NR |
|---|---|---|---|---|---|---|---|---|
| 1996—2006 | Did not participate | | | | | | | |
| (Belgium) 2007 | Division Three | Champions (▲) | 1/8 | 5 | 5 | 0 | 0 | 0 |
| (Guernsey) 2008 | Division Two | Round-robin (▼) | 6/6 | 5 | 0 | 5 | 0 | 0 |
| 2009—2010 | Did not qualify | | | | | | | |
| Total | | 2/8 | 1 Title | 10 | 5 | 5 | 0 | 0 |

=== European T20 Championship ===
European T20 Championship records
| Year | Division | Round | Position | GP | W | L | T | NR |
|---|---|---|---|---|---|---|---|---|
| (Jersey) 2011 | Division One | Round-robin (▼) | 12/12 | 7 | 0 | 7 | 0 | 0 |
| (Greece) 2012 | Division Two | Round-robin (▼) | 10/12 | 7 | 1 | 6 | 0 | 0 |
| (Jersey) 2015 | Did not participate | | | | | | | |
| Total | | 2 apps. | 0 Titles | 14 | 1 | 13 | 0 | 0 |

== Grounds ==
Location of international cricket matches played in Croatia

== Records and statistics ==
International Match Summary — Croatia

Last updated 23 May 2026.

Playing Record
| Format | M | W | L | T | NR | Inaugural Match |
| Twenty20 Internationals | 37 | 6 | 30 | 0 | 1 | 1 July 2022 |

=== Twenty20 International ===
- Highest team total: 199/2 v. Switzerland on 19 May 2026 at Happy Valley Ground 2, Episkopi.
- Highest individual score: 150*, Connor Carroll v. Switzerland on 19 May 2026 at Happy Valley Ground 2, Episkopi.
- Best individual bowling figures: 3/7, Daniel Turkich v. Finland on 18 July 2022 at Tikkurila Cricket Ground, Vantaa.

T20I record versus other nations

Records complete to T20I #3902. Last updated 23 May 2026.

| Opponent | M | W | L | T | NR | First match | First win |
|---|---|---|---|---|---|---|---|
vs Associate Members
| Austria | 1 | 0 | 1 | 0 | 0 | 23 May 2026 | |
| Belgium | 1 | 1 | 0 | 0 | 0 | 8 July 2024 | 8 July 2024 |
| Bulgaria | 1 | 0 | 1 | 0 | 0 | 23 June 2023 | |
| Cyprus | 5 | 1 | 4 | 0 | 0 | 7 August 2025 | 22 May 2026 |
| Finland | 1 | 0 | 1 | 0 | 0 | 18 July 2022 | |
| France | 1 | 0 | 1 | 0 | 0 | 17 May 2026 | |
| Germany | 1 | 0 | 1 | 0 | 0 | 14 July 2024 | |
| Greece | 1 | 1 | 0 | 0 | 0 | 15 July 2022 | 15 July 2022 |
| Hungary | 3 | 0 | 3 | 0 | 0 | 5 August 2023 | |
| Italy | 1 | 0 | 1 | 0 | 0 | 16 July 2022 | |
| Jersey | 1 | 0 | 1 | 0 | 0 | 20 May 2026 | |
| Serbia | 5 | 2 | 3 | 0 | 0 | 19 July 2022 | 19 July 2022 |
| Spain | 10 | 0 | 10 | 0 | 0 | 2 August 2024 | |
| Sweden | 1 | 0 | 1 | 0 | 0 | 13 July 2022 | |
| Switzerland | 2 | 1 | 1 | 0 | 0 | 13 July 2024 | 19 May 2026 |
| Turkey | 2 | 0 | 1 | 0 | 1 | 24 June 2023 | |

=== Other results ===
For a list of selected international matches played by Croatia, see Cricket Archive.

== See also ==
- List of Croatia Twenty20 International cricketers
