= Cricket Turkey =

Governing body of cricket in Turkey

- Sport: Cricket
- Jurisdiction: National
- Founded: 2008
- Affiliation: International Cricket Council
- Regional affiliation: ICC Europe
- Headquarters: Ankara
- Location: Turkey
- Chairman: Hayri Özkan
- CEO: Syed F. Mahmud

Official website
- trf.gov.tr

Cricket Turkey (Turkish: Türkiye Kriket) is the ICC-recognised governing body of the sport of cricket in Turkey that operates under the administration of Turkish Rugby Federation. Its headquarters are located in Ankara. It is Turkey's representative at the International Cricket Council and is an associate member and has been a member of that body since 2008, which is also the year when it was founded. It is also a member of the ICC Europe (earlier the European Cricket Council).

As cricket is not a ministry-sanctioned sport in Turkey, the organisation is not legally structured as a sports federation; rather, it is officially considered to be a sports club and is managed as a sports branch within the Rugby federation alongside Rugby union, American football, baseball/softball, and lacrosse.

== See also ==
- Turkey national cricket team
- Turkey women's national cricket team
- Turkey national under-19 cricket team
- Turkey women's national under-19 cricket team
