= Croatian Cricket Federation =

Governing body of cricket in Croatia

The Croatian Cricket Federation (Croatian: Hrvatski Kriket Savez) is the official governing body of the sport of cricket in Croatia. The current head office is located in Zagreb, the federation having been founded in 2000 and officially registered in 2004. The Croatian Cricket Federation is Croatia's representative at the International Cricket Council as an affiliate member since 2001. It is also a member of the ICC Europe (earlier the European Cricket Council) and provisional member of the Croatian Olympic Committee. In 2017, became an associate member

In July 2019, the International Cricket Council (ICC) suspended the Croatian Cricket Federation, with the team barred from taking part in ICC events.

In July 2021, Croatian Cricket Federation's frozen status was lifted by ICC, upon the receipt of appropriate paperwork. This enables Croatia to take part in ICC events from now on.

== See also ==
- Croatia national cricket team
- Croatia women's national cricket team
