= Cricket Spain =

State governing body on cricket in Spain

- Sport: Cricket
- Founded: 1992
- Regional affiliation: ICC Europe
- Location: Alicante, Spain
- President: Juan Carlos Rodriguez Martinez
- Coach: Corey Rutgers

Official website
- www.cricketspain.es
- (Spain)

Cricket Spain (Spanish: Cricket España) is the official governing body of the sport of cricket in Spain. Its headquarters are currently located at Alicante, near Valencia on the Mediterranean coast of Spain.

Cricket España is Spain's national representative at the International Cricket Council. It has been an ICC associate member since 1992, and is also a member of the ICC Europe (earlier the European Cricket Council).

== Constitution ==
Details of Cricket Spain's constitution can be seen via this link.

== Spanish club cricket ==
There are many cricket clubs in mainland Spain as well as the Balearic Islands, which compete in tournaments organised by Cricket Spain.

Costa del Sol CC is widely regarded as one of the top cricket clubs in Spain; their cricket facility now boasts two dedicated cricket grounds, including seven grass wickets on the Cartama Oval and one artificial wicket at the Victoria Oval, as well as grass wicket practice nets available for pre-season training camps, cricket festivals, tournaments and touring sides.
