= Cricket in Iceland =

- Country: Iceland
- Governing body: Krikketsamband Íslands
- National team: Iceland
- First played: 20th century
- Registered players: 135

Cricket is a growing sport in Iceland, involving six club teams (Reykjavík Vikings, Kópavogur Puffins, Garðabær Glaciers, Vesturbær Volcano, Hafnarfjörður Hammers, and Mosfellsbær Ravens) and the national side. Iceland is not a member of the International Cricket Council (ICC), but has ambitions to become an associate member of the ICC by 2030.

== History ==
It is likely that cricket was introduced to the country in the 20th century by immigrants and expatriates from cricket-playing nations such as England, Australia, and India. The 1944 edition of Wisden Cricketers' Almanack records two wartime games played between the Royal Air Force and the Royal Navy, with the Air Force winning by 36 runs in the first game and 24 runs in the second.

Efforts to grow participation in cricket by Icelanders are ongoing, however, there remains strong competition from more popular and established sports, such as football, handball, swimming, skiing and athletics. Iceland Cricket's X (social network) account is known for its witty social media presence, posting about cricket and global affairs in a dry, satirical tone.

== Governing body ==
Cricket in Iceland is organised by Krikketsamband Íslands (the Icelandic Cricket Association). As of 2025, they had 135 registered players.

== National team ==
A national team was formed in 2008, and competed at the 2016 Pepsi Cup tournament in Prague, finishing fifth out of six teams. They played their first (unofficial) international match, a win against Switzerland, in England during July 2018. Members of the r/Cricket forum on Reddit had raised money for the team through crowdfunding and became their official sponsors.

== Domestic teams ==
=== Former teams ===
The first two domestic cricket teams were Kylfan and Stykkishólmur, who contested the inaugural Icelandic Cricket Cup in 2000. A third team, from the Tryggingamiðstöðin insurance company, was formed in 2001. In 2008, another works team was formed by employees of Tata. After 2008, only Kylfan survived, changing its name to Reykjavík.

=== Current teams ===
Four municipalities regularly field teams in current domestic competitions:

- Reykjavík, nicknamed the Vikings, and formed by Ragnar Kristinsson in 2000.
- Kópavogur, nicknamed the Puffins, and formed by Abhi Chauhan in 2015.
- Hafnarfjörður, nicknamed the Hammers, and formed by Muhammad Younas in 2018.
- Vesturbær, nicknamed the Volcano, and formed by Kathir Narayanan in 2021.
- Garðabær, nicknamed the Glaciers, and formed by Jegadeesh Subramaniyam in 2023.
- Mosfellsbaer, nicknamed the Ravens, and formed by Jabir Hussain in 2026.

One other municipality has occasionally fielded teams in current domestic competitions:

- Seltjarnarnes, nicknamed the Sunsets, participated in the Summer Solstice Sixes in 2018.

=== List of honours ===
- Reykjavík have won ten titles since 2015:
  - Volcanic Ashes (2017, 2019), Summer Solstice / Viking Sixes (2019, 2020, 2023), Íslensk Premier League (2024), Sixty Ball Shootout (2021, 2023, 2024), and Valhalla Cup (2023).
- Kópavogur have won twelve titles since 2015:
  - Volcanic Ashes (2015, 2016, 2018, 2020, 2022), Íslensk Premier League (2020, 2023), Sixty Ball Shootout (2020, 2025, 2026), and Valhalla Cup (2022, 2024).
- Hafnarfjörður have won ten titles since 2015:
  - Summer Solstice Sixes (2018, 2021), Íslensk Premier League (2021, 2022, 2025, 2026), Sixty Ball Shootout (2022), Valhalla Cup (2025), Volcanic Ashes (2024) and Ashes on Ice Test (2022).
- Tryggingamiðstöðin have won one title:
  - Icelandic Cricket Cup (2002)
- Tata have won one title:
  - Icelandic Cricket Cup (2008)
- Vesturbær and Garðabær have won no titles.

== Domestic competitions ==
=== Former competitions ===
Iceland's first domestic cricket competition was the Icelandic Cricket Cup, played from 2000 to 2003, and revived in 2008 for one season.

The results were:

- 2000 Reykjavík (Kylfan) beat Stykkishólmur at Stykkishólmur.
- 2001 Reykjavík (Kylfan) beat Tryggingamiðstöðin at Tungubakkavellir.
- 2002 Tryggingamiðstöðin beat Reykjavík (Kylfan) at Víðistaðatún.
- 2003 Reykjavík (Kylfan) beat Stykkishólmur at Stykkishólmur.
- 2008 Tata beat Reykjavík (Kylfan) at Klambratún.

=== Current competitions ===
There are presently seven domestic cricket competitions in Iceland. The longest-running of these is the Volcanic Ashes, which began in 2015.

- The Volcanic Ashes is an indoor cricket competition. It has been held since 2015. The trophy is a replica Ashes urn set in volcanic basalt. The urn contains ashes from every volcanic eruption in Iceland since the formation of the Icelandic Cricket Association in 1999. It is currently a three-match knockout tournament, with semi-finals and a final.
- The Íslensk Premier League is a Twenty20 competition. It has been held annually since 2020. It is a round-robin league, in which each club plays the others twice. There is no final.
- The Sixty Ball Shootout is a T10 competition. It has been held annually since 2020. It is a round-robin league, in which each club plays the others twice. There is no final.
- The Summer Solstice Sixes is a six-a-side competition. It has been held annually since 2018. It is a knockout tournament, with quarter-finals, semi-finals and a final. There are eight teams, since each club enters an A and B team.
- The Valhalla Cup is a 40-over competition. It was first held in 2022. It is a three-match knockout tournament, with semi-finals and a final.
- The Ashes on Ice Test is a two-day, two innings a side competition between the winners of the Íslensk Premier League and either the winners of the Sixty Ball Shootout or the runners-up of the ÍPL. It was first held in 2022 between Hafnarfjörður and Vesturbær, with the former winning by 17 runs.
- The Samuel Gill Trophy is a 20-overs exhibition match, which traditionally closes the summer season. It has been held annually since 2020. Similar in principle to the Irani Trophy, it is contested between the Íslensk Premier League champions and a team representing the Rest of Iceland.

=== List of champions ===
This list shows the winners of competitions that still take place in Iceland.

Season	Volcanic Ashes	ÍPL	Shootout	Sixes	Valhalla Cup	Ashes on Ice Test
2015	Kópavogur					
2016	Kópavogur					
2017	Reykjavík					
2018	Kópavogur			Hafnarfjörður		
2019	Reykjavík			Reykjavík		
2020	Kópavogur	Kópavogur	Kópavogur	Reykjavík		
2021	not held	Hafnarfjörður	Reykjavík	Hafnarfjörður		Drawn
2022	Kópavogur	Hafnarfjörður	Hafnarfjörður	not played	Kópavogur	Hafnarfjörður
2023	not held	Kópavogur	Reykjavík	Reykjavík	Reykjavík	Drawn
2024	Hafnarfjörður	Reykjavík	Reykjavík	not held	Kópavogur	Drawn
2025	not held	Hafnarfjörður	Kópavogur	not held	Hafnarfjörður	not held
2026	not held	Hafnarfjörður	Kópavogur	not held	Reykjavík	not held

== Grounds ==
Iceland's first purpose-built cricket ground, the most northerly in the world, opened in Hafnarfjörður in May 2019 and was officially inaugurated by Katrín Jakobsdóttir, the Prime Minister of Iceland. Previously the country had no turf wicket, with matches being played on astroturf football pitches.
