= 2019 Valletta Cup =

International cricket tournament

- Dates: 17 – 20 October 2019
- Administrator(s): Malta Cricket Association
- Cricket format: Twenty20 International, Twenty20
- Host(s): Malta
- Champions: Czech Republic
- Runners-up: Hungary XI
- Participants: 4
- Matches: 9
- Player of the series: (Czech Republic) Sabawoon Davizi
- Most runs: (Czech Republic) Sabawoon Davizi (253)
- Most wickets: (Czech Republic) Kushalkumar Mendon (11)

The 2019 Valletta Cup, the inaugural edition of the Valletta Cup, was a Twenty20 cricket tournament held in Malta between 17 and 20 October 2019. The participating teams were the hosts Malta along with Czech Republic, Iceland and a Hungary XI. Matches played between Malta and the Czech Republic had official Twenty20 International (T20I) status, but because Iceland were not an Associate Member of the ICC and the selected Hungarian squad was not an official national side, matches involving either of these teams did not have T20I status. The matches were played at Marsa Sports Club in Marsa. The Hungarian XI won all of their round-robin matches and their semi-final, but were beaten by the Czech Republic in the final.

== Squads ==
Czech Republic	Hungary XI	Iceland	Malta
Edward Knowles (c); Hilal Ahmad (wk); Naveed Ahmed; Arun Ashokan; Shaun Dalton; Sabawoon Davizi; Kyle Gilham; Honey Gori; Siddarth Goud; Vojtech Hasa; Arshad Hayat; Kushalkumar Mendon; Shoumyadeep Rakshit; Paul Taylor; Sudesh Wickramasekara	Abhijeet Ahuja (c); Abhishek Ahuja; Shehroz Ali; Satyadeep Ashwathnarayana; Maaz Bhaiji; Habib Deldar; Khaibar Deldar; Steffan Gooch; Ali Haider; Abhishek Kheterpal; Zeeshan Kukikhel; Nishanta Liyanage; Harshvardhan Mandhyan; Akramullah Malikzada; Sufiyan Mohammed; Zahir Mohammed	Nolan Williams (c); Dushan Bandara; Lakmal Bandara; Keenan Botha; Abhi Chauhan; Leslie D'Cunha; Yougeshwar Deonarain; Brendon Fernando; Sammy Gill; Kit Harris; Sadun Lankathilaka; Lee Nelson (wk); Jakob Robertson; Prabhath Weerasooriya	Bikram Arora (c); Waseem Abbas; Sujesh Appu; Samuel Aquilina (wk); Sean Byrne; Gopal Chaturvedi; Michael Goonetilleke; Jurg Hirschi; Sumair Khan; Nowell Khosla; Alex Meears; Haroon Mughal; Suhrid Roy; Ravinder Singh; Aneesh Tomy

== Round robin ==
=== Points table ===
Team	P	W	L	T	NR	Pts	NRR
Hungary XI	3	3	0	0	0	6	+1.086
Czech Republic	3	2	1	0	0	4	+1.327
Malta	3	1	2	0	0	2	–0.295
Iceland	3	0	3	0	0	0	–2.186

=== Fixtures ===
17 October 2019
13:30
Scorecard

Iceland; 107/5 (20 overs)	v	Malta; 110/3 (18 overs)
Lee Nelson 49 (40); Ravinder Singh 3/9 (3 overs)		Bikram Arora 30* (33); Prabhath Weerasooriya 2/20 (4 overs)

Malta won by 7 wickets
Marsa Sports Club, Marsa
Umpires: Frankie Spiteri (Mlt) and Les White (Mlt)

- Iceland won the toss and elected to bat.

18 October 2019
08:00
Scorecard

Czech Republic; 148/5 (20 overs)	v	Malta; 136 (18.2 overs)
Sabawoon Davizi 91 (65); Jurg Hirschi 2/18 (4 overs)		Haroon Mughal 31 (23); Kushalkumar Mendon 3/19 (2 overs)

Czech Republic won by 12 runs
Marsa Sports Club, Marsa
Umpires: Les White (Mlt) and Ruben Sivanadian (Mlt)

- Czech Republic won the toss and elected to bat.
- Waseem Abbas, Sean Byrne, Gopal Chaturvedi, Michael Goonetilleke, Ravinder Singh (Mlt), Arun Ashokan, Sabawoon Davizi and Siddarth Goud (Cze) all made their T20I debuts.

18 October 2019
11:30
Scorecard

Iceland; 108/8 (20 overs)	v	Hungary XI; 109/5 (15.4 overs)
Keenan Botha 27 (33); Habib Deldar 2/16 (4 overs)		Zahir Mohammed 56 (26); Prabhath Weerasooriya 4/22 (4 overs)

Hungary XI won by 5 wickets
Marsa Sports Club, Marsa
Umpires: Les White (Mlt) and Ruben Sivanadian (Mlt)

- Iceland won the toss and elected to bat.

18 October 2019
15:00
Scorecard

Czech Republic; 155/7 (20 overs)	v	Iceland; 72/7 (20 overs)
Hilal Ahmad 47* (29); Keenan Botha 4/19 (4 overs)		Lakmal Bandara 21 (28); Kushalkumar Mendon 3/3 (2 overs)

Czech Republic won by 83 runs
Marsa Sports Club, Marsa
Umpires: Frankie Spiteri (Mlt) and Ruben Sivanadian (Mlt)

- Czech Republic won the toss and elected to bat.

19 October 2019
10:00
Scorecard

Czech Republic; 100/8 (20 overs)	v	Hungary XI; 101/3 (17.2 overs)
Edward Knowles 30* (28); Abhishek Kheterpal 3/13 (4 overs)		Abhishek Ahuja 32* (34); Paul Taylor 2/24 (4 overs)

Hungary XI won by 7 wickets
Marsa Sports Club, Marsa
Umpires: Subhas Roy (Mlt) and Ruben Sivanadian (Mlt)

- Hungary XI won the toss and elected to field.

19 October 2019
13:30
Scorecard

Malta; 94 (16.1 overs)	v	Hungary XI; 98/5 (17.2 overs)
Nowell Khosla 46 (36); Harshvardhan Mandhyan 4/11 (4 overs)		Ali Haider 25* (35); Jurg Hirschi 2/8 (2 overs)

Hungary XI won by 5 wickets
Marsa Sports Club, Marsa
Umpires: Ghose Roy (Mlt) and Les White (Mlt)

- Malta won the toss and elected to bat.

== Knockouts ==
=== Semi-finals ===
20 October 2019
08:00
Scorecard

Czech Republic; 204/4 (20 overs)	v	Malta; 122 (15.5 overs)
Sabawoon Davizi 101 (68); Sujesh Appu 1/26 (3 overs)		Gopal Chaturvedi 24 (11); Sabawoon Davizi 4/15 (3 overs)

Czech Republic won by 82 runs
Marsa Sports Club, Marsa
Umpires: Ruben Sivanadian (Mlt) and Les White (Mlt)

- Czech Republic won the toss and elected to bat.
- Suhrid Roy (Mlt) made his T20I debut.
- Sabawoon Davizi (Cze) scored his first century in T20Is.

20 October 2019
11:30
Scorecard

Iceland; 125/8 (20 overs)	v	Hungary XI; 126/1 (15.3 overs)
Yougeshwar Deonarain 61 (45); Abhishek Kheterpal 2/24 (4 overs)		Zeeshan Kukikhel 55 (25); Keenan Botha 1/8 (3 overs)

Hungary XI won by 9 wickets
Marsa Sports Club, Marsa
Umpires: Ghose Roy (Mlt) and Ruben Sivanadian (Mlt)

- Hungary XI won the toss and elected to field.

=== Final ===
20 October 2019
15:00
Scorecard

Hungary XI; 91 (17.2 overs)	v	Czech Republic; 97/2 (11.4 overs)
Zeeshan Kukikhel 28 (29); Naveed Ahmed 4/14 (4 overs)		Sabawoon Davizi 57* (40); Habib Deldar 1/14 (2 overs)

Czech Republic won by 8 wickets
Marsa Sports Club, Marsa
Umpires: Subhas Roy (Mlt) and Ruben Sivanadian (Mlt)

- Czech Republic won the toss and elected to field.
