= Slovenian Cricket Association =

Sports governing body in Slovenia

Cricket Slovenia logo

Slovenian Cricket Association is the official governing body of the sport of cricket in Slovenia. The Slovenian Cricket Association is Slovenia's representative at the International Cricket Council and is an associate member and has been a member of that body since 2005. It is also a member of the ICC Europe (earlier the European Cricket Council). Ljubljana Cricket Club, Slovenia's most established club, plays in the Austrian Cricket Association's Open League in addition to the Slovenian National League. In 2025 Slovenia became a member of the Olympic Committee of Slovenia.
