= Hungary national cricket team =

Cricket team

Hungary
- Association: Hungarian Cricket Association

Personnel
- Captain: Vinoth Ravindran
- Coach: -

International Cricket Council
- ICC status: Associate member (2017)
- ICC region: Europe
ICC Rankings	Current	Best-ever
T20I	69th	51st (14 May 2022)

International cricket
- First international: v Bulgaria (in Prague, Czech Republic; August 2008)

T20 Internationals
- First T20I: v Czech Republic at Moara Vlasiei Cricket Ground, Ilfov County; 2 September 2021
- Last T20I: v Belgium at Svanholm Park, Brøndby; 14 July 2026
T20Is	Played	Won/Lost
Total	58	23/33 (1 tie, 1 no result)
This year	12	3/9 (0 ties, 0 no results)
T20I kit
- As of 14 July 2026

The Hungary national cricket team represents Hungary in international cricket. In June 2012, Hungary was awarded the International Cricket Council (ICC) affiliate member status during the annual conference at Kuala Lumpur. In 2017, they became an associate member.

Their first friendly matches were played in Slovenia in September 2007. The first official match was played in Prague against Bulgaria in August 2008.

In April 2018, the ICC decided to grant full Twenty20 International (T20I) status to all its members. Therefore, all Twenty20 matches played between Hungary and other ICC members after 1 January 2019 are full T20Is.

In 2021 Hungary was among five teams excluded from the ICC T20I Championship for failing to play enough fixtures in the relevant period, an effect of the COVID-19 pandemic.

== Tournament history ==
T20 World Cup Europe Sub-regional Qualifiers	European Twenty20 Championship	Continental Cup	Valletta Cup
2018: Did not participate; 2023: 8th place; 2024: 9th place	2010: Winners; 2011: Winners; 2012: Round-robin	2021: 3rd place; 2024: Winners; 2025: 5th place	2019: Runners-up; 2022: 4th place

== International grounds ==
Locations of stadiums which have hosted international cricket matches in Hungary

Ground	City	Region	Capacity	Matches hosted	Notes
GB Oval	Sződliget	Central Hungary	500	T20Is	Home of Hungary cricket; hosts T20I series and European Cricket Network matches

== Records ==
International Match Summary — Hungary

Last updated 14 July 2026.

Playing Record
Format	M	W	L	T	NR	Inaugural Match
Twenty20 Internationals	58	23	33	1	1	2 September 2021

=== Twenty20 International ===
T20I record versus other nations

Records complete to T20I #4032. Last updated 14 July 2026.

Opponent	M	W	L	T	NR	First match	First win
vs Associate Members
Austria	11	2	8	0	1	4 June 2022	5 June 2022
Belgium	4	0	4	0	0	29 June 2022	
Bulgaria	1	1	0	0	0	11 May 2022	11 May 2022
Croatia	3	3	0	0	0	5 August 2023	5 August 2023
Czech Republic	6	1	4	1	0	2 September 2021	2 September 2021
Denmark	2	0	2	0	0	28 June 2022	
Estonia	1	1	0	0	0	10 July 2026	10 July 2026
France	1	1	0	0	0	29 June 2025	29 June 2025
Gibraltar	2	1	1	0	0	10 May 2022	10 May 2022
Israel	2	1	1	0	0	3 July 2022	12 June 2024
Luxembourg	3	2	1	0	0	4 September 2021	25 July 2025
Malta	4	3	1	0	0	5 September 2021	5 September 2021
Norway	2	1	1	0	0	17 August 2025	8 July 2026
Portugal	1	0	1	0	0	9 June 2024	
Romania	6	1	5	0	0	3 September 2021	12 May 2022
Serbia	3	0	3	0	0	29 August 2025	
Slovenia	3	3	0	0	0	21 June 2025	
Sweden	1	0	1	0	0	17 August 2025	
Switzerland	1	0	1	0	0	19 June 2026	
Turkey	1	1	0	0	0	12 July 2026	12 July 2026

== Current squad ==
Updated as of 29 August 2025.

This lists all the players who were part of the Hungarian squad for the 2025 Eastern Europe Cup.

Name	Age	Batting style	Bowling style	Last T20I	Notes
Batters
Zahir Mohammed	35	Right-handed	Right-arm medium	(Serbia) 2025	
Mutte Ikram	25	Right-handed	—N/a	(Serbia) 2025	
All-rounder
Arslan Basharat	27	Left-handed	Left-arm medium	(Serbia) 2025	
Jeremy Polarouthu	22	Right-handed	Right-arm medium	(Croatia) 2025	
Muhammad Soban	24	Right-handed	Right-arm off break	(Serbia) 2025	
Mark des Fontaine	20	Right-handed	Right-arm medium	(Serbia) 2025	
Robert Ainsworth	20	Right-handed	Right-arm medium	(Serbia) 2025	
Gabor Torok	45	Right-handed	Right-arm medium	(Serbia) 2025	Captain
Amal Jacob	32	Right-handed	Slow left-arm orthodox	(Serbia) 2025	
Dheeraj Gaikwad	37	Right-handed	Right-arm medium	(Croatia) 2025	
Matthew Ainsworth	18	Right-handed	Right-arm medium	(Serbia) 2025	
Wicket-keeper
Asanka Weligamage	42	Right-handed	Right-arm medium-fast	(Serbia) 2025	
Leo Bloomfield	22	Right-handed	—N/a	(Croatia) 2025	
Pace Bowlers
Adam Gall	19	Right-handed	Right-arm medium	(Serbia) 2025	
Sadat Said	22	Right-handed	Right-arm medium	(Serbia) 2025	
Ahmed Khan	35	Right-handed	Right-arm medium	(Serbia) 2025	
Spin Bowlers
Zoltan Marosy	20	Right-handed	Leg break googly	(Serbia) 2025	

== See also ==
- List of Hungary Twenty20 International cricketers
