= Hungarian Cricket Association =

Sports governing body in Hungary

The Hungarian Cricket Association is the governing body of the sport of cricket in Hungary. It was founded in October 2006. Its headquarters are located in Budapest. The National Cricket Ground is the GB Oval in Sződliget, just north of Budapest.

The Hungarian Cricket Association represents Hungary in the International Cricket Council, of which it is one of the newest affiliate members, having been accepted into membership in 2012. In 2017, it became an associate member.

== Hungarian Cricket League ==
	League name	Winners	Overs	Teams
2007	Hungarian Cricket League	Crown	25	6
2008	Hungarian Cricket League	Royal Tigers	25	8
2009	Premier League	Royal Tigers	30	6
2009	Development Division	Comenius Boys	20	4
2010	Hungarian Cricket League	Budapest Falcons	30	7
2011	MPI35 League	Budapest Falcons	35	7
2011	T20 League	Cobras	20	4
2012	MPI35 League	Budapest Falcons	35	6
2012	Doherty25 League	Baggy Blues Bollix	25	4
2013	Premier League	Royal Tigers	40	4
2013	Doherty 30 2nd Division	Baggy Blues Whites	30	8
2014	Premier League	Baggy Blues International	40	4
2014	30-over league	Dunabogdany	30	4
2014	Development League	Hungary Juniors	15	3
2015	Premier League	Baggy Blues International	30	7
2015	T20 League	Budapest Falcons	20	7
2016	30-over league	Baggy Blues International	30	3
2016	25-over league	Dunabogdany	25	4
2017	40-over league	Royal Tigers	40	2
2017	T20 League	Royal Tigers	20	2
2017	25-over league	Baggy Blues Challengers	25	4
2018	Club League	DCC	20	4
2018	Premier League	Royal Tigers	20	4

== Cup competitions ==
2010	BCCH T20 Cup	Royal Tigers
2011	T20 Cup	Budapest Falcons
2012	CGS T20 Cup	Budapest Falcons
2013	CGS T20 Cup	Budapest Falcons
2014	T20 Cup	Royal Tigers
2016	T20 Cup	Baggy Blues International
2017	T20 Cup	Dunabogdany
2018	40 Overs Cup	Royal Tigers

== Clubs ==
Club	Team name	2007	2008	2009		2010	2011		2012		2013		2014			2015		2016		2017			2018	
Club	Team name	HCL	HCL	PL	DD	HCL	MPI35	T20	MPI35	D25	PL	D30	PL	30	DL	PL	T20	30	25	40	T20	25	CL	PL
Baggy Blues	1st XI	4	2	2			2		2		3		1	3		1	3	1		2	2			3
Baggy Blues	2nd XI			6																				
Baggy Blues	Artosz					3																		
Baggy Blues	BISB							4																
Baggy Blues	Blue											8												
Baggy Blues	Bollix									1														
Baggy Blues	Challengers						3									6	4		2			2	2	
Baggy Blues	Full Tossers					5																		
Baggy Blues	White											1												
Bat and Ball Academy														4					3			1	4	
Budapest Falcons						1	1		1		2	3	4			2	1							
Cobras								1																
Comenius	Boys				1																			
Comenius	Anita Girls				2																			
Comenius	Seniors	5	6																					
Crown		1																						
Danubian Kangaroos			5	5		6		2		3	7			2		7	5		4			4	3	
Debrecen Falcons							4																	
Dunabogdany		6	8			7	7		6	2	6			1		5	7		1			3	1	2
Dunabogdany	Fairies							3																
Eleven Stars											5		3			3	2							
Genpact		2	4																					
Green Kings				4																				
Hungary Juniors															1									
Hungary Women															3									
IBM					3																			
Kohinoor			3	3																				
Native Hungarian Men															2									
Phoenix			7			4	5		5		4	4						2						
Royal Tigers			1	1		2			4		1	2	2			4	6	3		1	1			1
Spartans							6		3															
Tasmanian Devils					4																			
Titanic		3																						
Tunderek										4														

== National team highlights ==
First matches played in Slovenia in September 2007. First official match played in Prague against Bulgaria in August 2008.

Hungary won the European Twenty20 Championship of 2010, held in Skopje, Macedonia, beating Russia in the final. They defended the title in August 2011 at their home ground, Szödliget, just north of Budapest, with victory over Bulgaria in the final.

In the 2014 season, Habib Deldar was the captain of the Hungarian national cricket team, and Abhijeet Marc Ahuja was vice-captain.

== Women's cricket ==
Female cricketers have been involved in Hungarian cricket since its introduction in Comenius School in Székesfehérvár in September 2006, as players, coaches, umpires and scorers. A women's national team has represented Hungary at home and abroad since February 2008 (Potsdam, Germany).

Hungary hosted international women's tournaments in 2009 and 2010. The women's national team came second in a 4-nation tournament in Belgium in 2011, losing to Germany in the final.

== Junior cricket ==
Introducing and coaching cricket in schools has taken place non-stop since September 2006 and there are regular introduction to cricket workshops and demonstrations.

Juniors have played in the Hungarian Cricket League since its inception in 2007 and have travelled around Europe representing Hungary since June 2007. One highlight was victory in a tournament in Croatia in 2010. National championships have been held indoors and outdoors since February 2010.

== Native cricket ==
Hungary will host a European international native tournament on June 28–30, 2019 against Poland, Serbia and Estonia.

== HCA Board ==
Nov 2006 - Dec 2008: Andrew Leckonby (BB), Andy Grieve, Chairman (Com), David Brown (DCC)

Dec 2008 - Sept 2009: Ferenc Zsigri, President (DK), Gabor Torok (DK), Mike Glover (BBA)

Sept 2009 - Feb 2011: Andrew Leckonby (BBA, Benjamin Lebor (Pho), David Brown (DCC), Gabor Torok, President (DK), Mike Glover (BBA)

Feb 2011 - Feb 2013: Adrian Zador (DCC), Andrew Leckonby (BBA), Benjamin Lebor (Pho), Gabor Torok, President (DK), Mike Glover (BBA)

Feb 2013 - Feb 2015: Adrian Zador (DCC), Andras Toth, Andrew Leckonby (BBA), Khaibar Deldar (BF), Marton Kis, President

2016 - 2018: Duncan Shoebridge, Marton Kis, Steve Anthony, Adrian Zador

2018 - 2020:

2020 - 2022:

2022 - 2024: Stan Ahuja, Anil Pattanaik, Bhavani Prasad, Steffan Gooch, Medha Gooch, Satyender Parihar, Srinivas Mandali

2024 - 2026: Stan Ahuja, Anthony Gall, Anup Gupta, Ali Farasat, Jack Murrell, Sachin Chauhan, Sanjay Kumar, Annamarie Ban Des Fontaine
