= Reykjavik Art Museum =

Art institution in Iceland

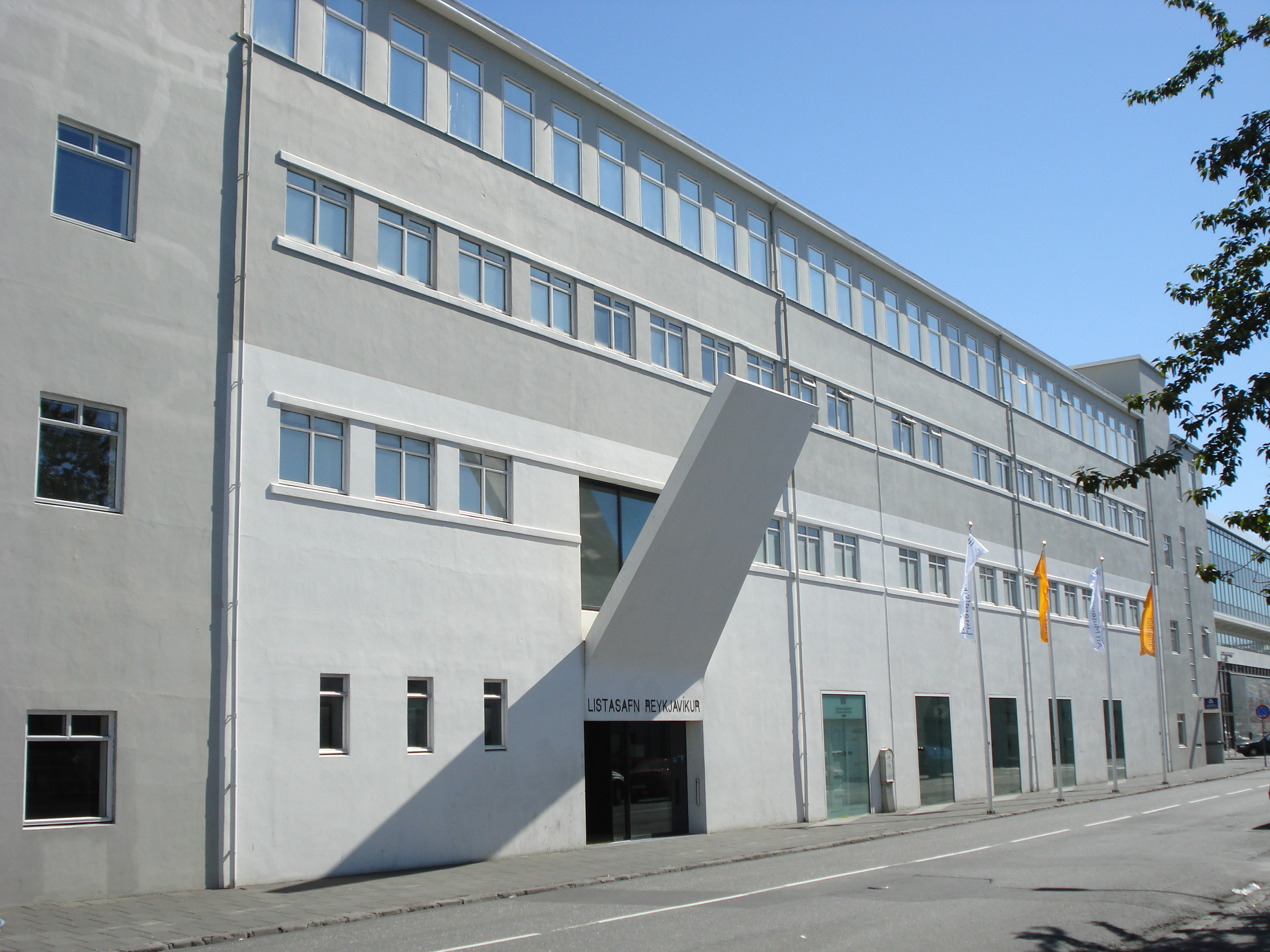
Reykjavik Art Museum in Reykjavík (Hafnarhúsið)

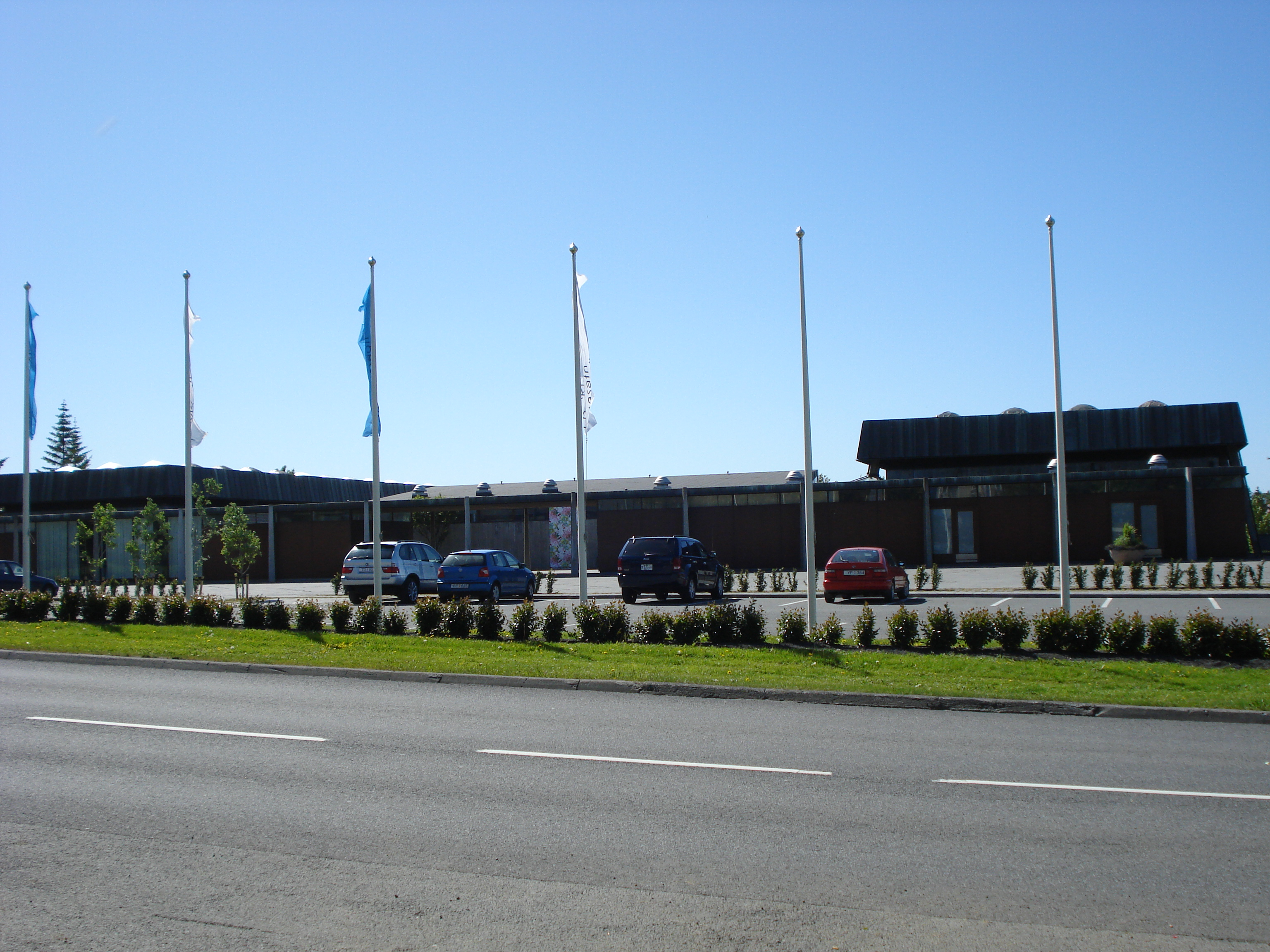
Kjarvalsstaðir

Reykjavik Art Museum (Icelandic: Listasafn Reykjavíkur [ˈlɪstaˌsapn ˌreiːcaˌviːkʏr̥]; founded in 1973) is the largest visual art institution in Iceland. It occupies three locations in Reykjavík; Hafnarhús by the old harbour (64.1490°N 21.9406°W), Kjarvalsstaðir by Klambratún (64.1378°N 21.9135°W) and Ásmundarsafn in Laugardalur (64.1416°N 21.8853°W).

The Museum houses the largest art collection and the most voluminous gallery space in Iceland. With more than 3000 square meters of gallery space, over twenty exhibitions are run here annually, ranging from extensive exhibitions of the museum's collection to installations of contemporary art by young and international artists.

The Museum offers a variety of events where people are given the opportunity to examine artworks and collections from different angles and emphasis. Extensive family programmes and guided tours for students (in all levels) are conducted. In addition, the museum takes an active part in a wide range of cooperative projects and festivals in the fields of music, film, design, dance, drama, and literature.

The Museum is in charge of the city's art collection while Reykjavík city is responsible for the management and financing of the museum. Reykjavik Art Museum consists of five separate art properties: a general art collection of Reykjavík city (including outdoor works in Reykjavík), an Erró collection, a Kjarval collection, the Ásmundur Sveinsson Sculpture Museum and a collection of the architecture department.

Some artworks from the museum is also on display in public buildings and open areas throughout the city.

== Hafnarhús ==
Hafnarhús is the most recent addition to the locations of Reykjavik Art Museum and was occupied after a complete renovation in April 2000. The building had its former function as the harbour's warehouse and during its renovation, care was taken to preserve as much as possible of the building's original architecture.

The museum comprises six galleries, the courtyard and a multi-purpose room where ongoing events of a wide variety take place, ranging from rock concerts to poetry reading. Hafnarhús exhibits works from the Erró collection at all times. The Icelandic pop-artist Erró (1932) who has lived and worked in Paris for decades has donated a tremendous collection of his invaluable works and is still adding to the collection.

== Kjarvalsstaðir ==
Kjarvalsstaðir (opened 1973) is named after one of the most beloved painters of the nation, Jóhannes S. Kjarval (1885–1972). His works form a large part of the collection of Reykjavik Art Museum and can be found there at all times. Kjarval was a living legend, a romantic bohem who captured the beauty and mystique of the land which he so intimately knew. The unique building of Kjarvalsstaðir is surrounded by garden of Klambratún and is located a short distance from downtown Reykjavík. The building is the first of its kind in Iceland to be specifically designed for visual art exhibitions. In addition to exhibitions of Kjarval's works, temporary exhibitions of Icelandic and international art are featured as well as architecture and design with emphasis on works of the twentieth century.

== Ásmundarsafn ==
Ásmundarsafn (opened 1983) is dedicated to the sculptures and drawings of Ásmundur Sveinsson (1893–1982). The works to be seen there span Ásmundur's entire career and they are featured thematically as well as collectively with works of other artists. Ásmundur was one of Iceland's pioneers in the art of sculpture and his works are located both outdoors and indoors throughout the country.

Ásmundur's sculptures are exhibited inside as well as outside the museum, which is the artist's former home and studio. Ásmundur designed and built the house mostly by himself in the years 1942 to 1950. In the architecture he plays with a theme from the Arab culture along with a Mediterranean influence. A sculpture garden surrounding the museum with works by the artist stays open to the public all year round.
