= Cricket in Russia =

Cricket in Russia is a sport played at the amateur, club, intercollegiate, and international competition levels.

Russia has a national team for international cricket. In 2012, they were officially endorsed by the International Cricket Council (ICC) as an Affiliate member. In April 2018, the ICC decided to grant full Twenty20 International (T20I) status to all its members. Therefore, all Twenty20 matches played between Russia and other ICC Members after 1 January 2019 would be full T20Is. But in July 2022, because of their continued non-compliance with ICC membership criteria, the ICC terminated Russia's membership in the organization.

== History ==
The game was played in St. Petersburg as early as the 1870s.

By 1995 cricket was played again in Russia, where two groups made up of expatriates took part in a friendly match. In 2004 the United Cricket League was registered as a lawful entity, presently renamed Cricket Russia. Cricket Russia is the main enrolled National Governing Body for Cricket in Russia. The Russia national cricket team played their first home representative match against a touring side from North Wales, Carmel and District Cricket Club, at the Moscow State University Baseball Stadium in 2007. Cricket in Russia is recognised by the Multisport Association of Russia; this is the relationship for all sporting governing associations inside Russia which are not yet Olympic sports. In 2012 Cricket Russia joined the ICC.

In July 2019, cricket was not included on Russia's list of official sports. It meant that Cricket Russia did not receive government funding over the year. However, in May 2020, the Russian Government reversed its decision, recognising cricket as a sport, and therefore eligible for funding.

On 18 July 2021, Russia was suspended due to continued non-compliance with ICC Membership Criteria, was ordered to demonstrate compliance before the time of the next AGM or face having its membership of ICC terminated with immediate effect.

An ICC statement in July 2022 explained that Russia’s 2021 suspension was the result of a failure to comply with ICC membership criteria dating back to July 2019 and that membership had been "terminated" following a failure to overcome those issues.

== See also ==
- Russia national cricket team
