= List of Hungary Twenty20 International cricketers =

This is a list of Hungarian Twenty20 International cricketers.

In April 2018, the International Cricket Council (ICC) decided to grant full Twenty20 International (T20I) status to all its members. Therefore, all Twenty20 matches played between Hungary and other ICC members after 1 January 2019 have the full T20I status.

This list comprises names of all members of the Hungary cricket team who have played at least one T20I match. It is initially arranged in the order in which each player won his first Twenty20 cap. Where more than one player won his first Twenty20 cap in the same match, those players are listed alphabetically by surname (according to the name format used by Cricinfo).

Hungary played their first match with the T20I status on 2 September 2021, against the Czech Republic during the 2021 Continental Cup.

== Key ==
General

- ‡ – Captain
- † – Wicket-keeper
- First – Year of debut
- Last – Year of latest game
- Mat – Number of matches played

Batting

- Runs – Runs scored in career
- HS – Highest score
- Avg – Runs scored per dismissal
- * – Batsman remained not out
- 50 – Half-centuries scored
- 100 – Centuries scored

Bowling

- Balls – Balls bowled in career
- Wkt – Wickets taken in career
- BBI – Best bowling in an innings
- Ave – Average runs per wicket

Fielding

- Ca – Catches taken
- St – Stumpings affected

== List of players ==
Statistics are correct as of 14 July 2026.

Hungary T20I cricketers
General					Batting					Bowling				Fielding		Ref
No.	Name	First	Last	Mat	Runs	HS	Avg	50	100	Balls	Wkt	BBI	Ave	Ca	St	Ref
1	Abhijeet Ahuja‡	2021	2023	19	314	75	18.47	2	0	12	2	2/8	4.00	6	0	
2	Ali Yalmaz	2021	2024	14	87	19	7.25	0	0	156	10	3/16	24.80	3	0	
3	Satyadeep Ashwathnarayana†	2021	2022	14	203	52	25.37	1	0	–	–	–	–	7	0	
4	Khaibar Deldar‡	2021	2025	18	214	49	13.37	0	0	72	3	1/17	39.33	8	0	
5	Abishek Kheterpal	2021	2023	18	309	42	28.09	0	0	366	12	3/19	38.58	4	0	
6	Nishanta Liyanage	2021	2021	2	–	–	–	–	–	–	–	–	–	0	0	
7	Harshvardhan Mandhyan	2021	2024	21	234	41	11.70	0	0	466	25	3/30	22.24	6	0	
8	Sandeep Mohandas	2021	2026	42	103	26*	9.36	0	0	774	32	3/17	31.06	8	0	
9	Asanka Weligamage†	2021	2025	16	123	45	13.66	0	0	186	6	3/45	54.33	5	0	
10	Zahir Mohammed‡	2021	2026	42	676	85	17.33	3	0	6	0	–	–	10	0	
11	Zeeshan Kukikhel	2021	2025	27	793	137	30.50	5	1	297	20	3/31	21.95	11	0	
12	Mark Fontaine	2021	2026	17	147	49*	14.70	0	0	89	4	2/15	35.25	2	0	
13	Sanjay Kumar	2021	2021	2	9	8	9.00	0	0	–	–	–	–	0	0	
14	Abhishek Ahuja†	2022	2024	17	281	61	17.56	1	0	–	–	–	–	17	3	
15	Bhavani Adapaka	2022	2023	17	6	2	2.00	0	0	313	13	3/17	30.15	1	0	
16	Akramullah Malikzada	2022	2022	5	0	0*	0.00	0	0	18	1	1/7	44.00	1	0	
17	Ali Farasat	2022	2026	25	255	32	12.14	0	0	–	–	–	–	1	0	
18	Gabor Torok‡	2022	2026	6	38	35	12.66	0	0	8	0	–	–	0	0	
19	Kalum Akurugoda	2022	2022	2	7	7	3.50	0	0	24	1	1/52	52.00	0	0	
20	Abhitesh Prashar	2023	2025	13	144	35	16.00	0	0	216	13	2/8	16.92	5	0	
21	Vinoth Ravindran‡†	2023	2026	33	842	77	27.16	5	0	71	4	3/6	27.50	26	1	
22	Abbas Ghani	2023	2026	29	739	90	26.39	7	0	283	24	4/14	17.66	20	0	
23	Sheikh Rasik	2023	2025	10	344	106*	43.00	2	1	174	7	3/25	27.00	6	0	
24	Yadwinder Singh	2023	2023	1	9	9*	–	0	0	12	0	–	–	1	0	
25	Amal Jacob	2024	2026	23	108	31	10.80	0	0	364	17	3/34	27.70	5	0	
26	Danyal Akbar	2024	2024	3	30	17	15.00	0	0	–	–	–	–	1	0	
27	Kamran Wahid	2024	2026	12	49	24	6.12	0	0	210	12	3/24	25.41	2	0	
28	Muhammad Burhan	2024	2025	11	54	16	6.00	0	0	210	12	4/25	21.08	3	0	
29	Matthew Ainsworth	2025	2026	22	234	50*	15.60	1	0	276	13	2/15	32.07	9	0	
30	Ximus du Plooy‡	2025	2025	4	85	44	28.33	0	0	30	1	1/37	51.00	4	0	
31	Muhammad Saqlain	2025	2026	24	5	4*	1.00	0	0	457	33	5/8	19.12	1	0	
32	Muhammad Usman	2025	2025	14	279	72*	27.90	1	0	12	0	–	–	5	0	
33	Tejendra Valivarthi†	2025	2025	5	15	10	7.50	0	0	–	–	–	–	5	0	
34	Chris Dowle	2025	2025	1	–	–	–	–	–	–	–	–	–	0	0	
35	Ali Nawaz	2025	2026	22	247	41	14.52	0	0	138	10	5/24	26.70	2	0	
36	Jeremy Polarouthu	2025	2025	5	51	22*	17.00	0	0	24	0	–	–	0	0	
37	Khushal Gabhane	2025	2025	3	36	26*	–	0	0	18	2	2/29	14.50	1	0	
38	Ibrar Ahmad	2025	2026	8	60	16*	12.00	0	0	123	10	5/27	22.70	3	0	
39	Sadat Said	2025	2026	8	8	5*	4.00	0	0	137	11	3/32	18.27	6	0	
40	Robert Ainsworth	2025	2026	14	131	51*	18.71	0	0	47	2	1/20	52.00	5	0	
41	Kasir Ahmed	2025	2026	8	90	19	11.25	0	0	24	2	2/29	27.00	2	0	
42	Ahmed Khan	2025	2025	5	11	10*	11.00	0	0	66	1	1/27	87.00	0	0	
43	Arslan Basharat	2025	2025	5	77	54	19.25	1	0	30	1	1/31	47.00	0	0	
44	Leo Bloomfield†	2025	2026	5	1	1	1.00	0	0	–	–	–	–	3	0	
45	Muhammad Soban	2025	2026	14	318	57	22.71	2	0	246	5	2/23	58.60	4	0	
46	Mutte Ikram	2025	2025	1	10	10	10.00	0	0	–	–	–	–	0	0	
47	Dheeraj Gaikwad	2025	2026	3	32	20	16.00	0	0	19	0	–	–	1	0	
48	Adam Gall	2025	2025	1	1	1*	–	0	0	12	0	–	–	0	0	
49	Zoltan Marosy	2025	2026	2	2	2*	2.00	0	0	–	–	–	–	1	0	
50	Maaz Bhaiji	2026	2026	9	157	81	17.44	1	0	–	–	–	–	4	0	
