= List of Croatia Twenty20 International cricketers =

This is a list of Croatia Twenty20 International cricketers.

In April 2018, the ICC decided to grant full Twenty20 International (T20I) status to all its members. Therefore, all Twenty20 matches played between Croatia and other ICC members after 1 January 2019 have the T20I status.

This list will comprise all members of the Croatia cricket team who have played at least one T20I match. It is initially arranged in the order in which each player won his first Twenty20 cap. Where more than one player will win his first Twenty20 cap in the same match, those players will be listed alphabetically by surname (according to the name format used by Cricinfo).

Croatia played their first match with T20I status on 13 July 2022 against Sweden during the 2022–23 ICC Men's T20 World Cup Europe Qualifier.

== Key ==
General

- ‡ – Captain
- † – Wicket-keeper
- First – Year of debut
- Last – Year of latest game
- Mat – Number of matches played

Batting

- Runs – Runs scored in career
- HS – Highest score
- Avg – Runs scored per dismissal
- * – Batsman remained not out
- 50 – Half-centuries scored

Bowling

- Balls – Balls bowled in career
- Wkt – Wickets taken in career
- BBI – Best bowling in an innings
- Ave – Average runs per wicket

Fielding

- Ca – Catches taken
- St – Stumpings affected

== Players ==
Statistics are correct as of 23 May 2026.

Cap	Name	First	Last	Mat	Batting					Bowling				Fielding		Ref(s)
Cap	Name	First	Last	Mat	Runs	HS	Avg	50	100	Balls	Wkt	BBI	Ave	Ca	St	Ref(s)
1	Wasal Bitis	2022	2023	9	93	32*	15.50	0	0	78	3	2/39	37.00	2	0	
2	Jeffrey Grzinic‡†	2022	2024	7	21	8*	7.00	0	0	1	0	–	–	5	1	
3	Boro Jerkovic	2022	2024	9	34	11*	17.00	0	0	54	4	3/19	24.75	1	0	
4	Aman Maheshwari	2022	2024	12	40	16	4.00	0	0	113	5	2/41	38.00	5	0	
5	Daniel Marsic	2022	2024	9	105	37	13.12	0	0	–	–	–	–	2	0	
6	Jason Newton	2022	2022	4	32	26	8.00	0	0	79	3	1/10	22.00	2	0	
7	Sohail Ahmad	2022	2023	9	51	20	8.50	0	0	60	3	2/63	45.00	4	0	
8	Christopher Turkich	2022	2024	9	107	20	11.88	0	0	–	–	–	–	2	0	
9	Daniel Turkich	2022	2024	9	91	29	10.11	0	0	180	11	3/7	12.27	3	0	
10	Sheldon Valjalo	2022	2022	5	42	14	10.50	0	0	90	4	2/31	31.50	0	0	
11	John Vujnovich	2022	2025	13	157	38	13.08	0	0	225	11	2/23	25.81	4	0	
12	Nikola Davidovic	2022	2026	8	35	16	6.66	0	0	84	5	3/22	33.80	1	0	
13	Naseem Khan	2022	2023	8	49	27	9.80	0	0	54	2	1/8	42.50	1	0	
14	Mate Jukic	2022	2022	2	–	–	–	–	–	–	–	–	–	0	0	
15	Pero Bosnjak†	2023	2025	12	17	7	2.12	0	0	–	–	–	–	3	0	
16	Akshay Daxini	2023	2023	4	11	5	3.66	0	0	9	0	–	–	–	–	
17	Antonio Faletar	2023	2023	4	0	0*	0.00	0	0	–	–	–	–	0	0	
18	Dominik Faletar	2023	2023	4	4	4*	2.00	0	0	–	–	–	–	0	0	
19	Hrvoje Hajnic	2023	2023	4	3	3*	1.50	0	0	–	–	–	–	0	0	
20	Alen Magdalenic	2023	2025	17	36	14*	3.00	0	0	26	0	–	–	2	0	
21	Luke Stubbs	2023	2023	4	2	2	0.66	0	0	–	–	–	–	0	0	
22	Vedran Zanko‡	2023	2025	11	57	16	6.33	0	0	40	3	2/9	18.66	2	0	
23	Ivan Splicevic†	2023	2023	2	0	0*	0.00	0	0	–	–	–	–	1	0	
24	Ivan Matic	2023	2023	2	0	0	0.00	0	0	–	–	–	–	0	0	
25	Christopher Osborne	2023	2023	2	11	8*	11.00	0	0	24	3	3/25	10.66	0	0	
26	Vasu Pulibanti	2023	2024	7	29	10	5.80	0	0	12	1	1/15	15.00	0	0	
27	Anthony Govorko†	2024	2024	4	1	1*	–	0	0	–	–	–	–	4	0	
28	Michael Grzinic	2024	2024	3	12	6	4.00	0	0	36	4	2/7	4.50	1	0	
29	Luke Potthoff	2024	2024	2	5	5*	–	0	0	30	4	3/18	8.25	1	0	
30	Phillip Roberts	2024	2024	4	59	39*	19.66	0	0	54	1	1/12	63.00	4	0	
31	Zach Vukusic‡	2024	2025	8	210	53	26.25	1	0	129	7	2/10	27.00	5	0	
32	Jaikumar Thakur	2024	2025	7	42	20	6.00	0	0	90	3	2/29	42.66	0	0	
33	Oliver Tilley	2024	2026	13	95	22	10.55	0	0	119	5	2/21	41.20	2	0	
34	Aman Chaubey	2024	2024	4	14	7	3.50	0	0	79	3	3/30	42.00	2	0	
35	Jawahar Danikula‡	2024	2024	5	39	19	7.80	0	0	114	7	3/17	21.85	2	0	
36	Sam Houghton‡†	2024	2026	22	340	88	16.19	1	0	23	1	1/21	61.00	10	1	
37	Rashid Hashmi†	2024	2026	6	54	28	10.80	0	0	–	–	–	–	1	2	
38	Vigneshwaran Rathinasamy	2024	2024	4	25	13	6.25	0	0	36	2	1/6	18.50	0	0	
39	Saghar Manzoor	2024	2026	20	277	38	16.29	0	0	–	–	–	–	3	0	
40	Arun Sathyan	2024	2024	2	10	10	10.00	0	0	12	1	1/16	16.00	0	0	
41	Arpit Shukla	2024	2024	5	20	9	4.00	0	0	36	1	1/40	52.00	0	0	
42	Kresimir Kekez	2024	2024	3	8	6	4.00	0	0	12	0	–	–	1	0	
43	Hariprasad Satheedevi	2024	2025	8	118	43*	16.85	0	0	120	7	2/12	27.57	3	0	
44	Alfred Beresford-Peirse	2025	2025	12	136	39	15.11	0	0	252	8	2/30	44.25	2	0	
45	Henry Beresford-Peirse	2025	2025	3	10	7	5.00	0	0	54	2	1/26	47.00	0	0	
46	Charles Bevin	2025	2025	6	185	73*	46.25	1	0	108	4	2/26	45.25	2	0	
47	Scott Bevin	2025	2025	3	14	14	7.00	0	0	2	0	–	–	0	0	
48	Anthony Razmilic	2025	2026	16	25	10	2.77	0	0	140	4	2/20	65.00	1	0	
49	Abhishek Awasthi†	2025	2025	8	13	4	3.25	0	0	51	1	1/32	128.00	1	0	
50	David Lambasa	2025	2025	3	5	5	5.00	0	0	–	–	–	–	0	0	
51	Sajid Khan	2025	2026	13	13	5	3.25	0	0	157	5	1/14	48.00	5	0	
52	Achari Sethunathan	2025	2025	3	6	6*	–	0	0	–	–	–	–	1	0	
53	Andrija Curavic	2025	2026	6	6	3	1.50	0	0	6	1	1/11	11.00	1	0	
54	Damir Svilicic	2025	2025	5	5	4*	2.50	0	0	66	1	1/52	141.00	1	0	
55	Ranjithkumar Murugan	2025	2025	3	1	1*	0.50	0	0	–	–	–	–	0	0	
56	Connor Carroll	2026	2026	5	395	150*	98.75	3	1	120	2	1/22	91.00	3	0	
57	Damien Hall	2026	2026	5	29	12	9.66	0	0	120	7	2/28	91.00	0	0	
58	Jared Newton	2026	2026	5	81	50	16.20	1	0	120	4	2/29	37.50	1	0	
59	Matija Separovic	2026	2026	4	1	1	0.50	0	0	66	1	1/33	134.00	1	0	
60	Borna Pejic	2026	2026	1	0	0	0.00	0	0	6	0	—	—	1	0	
