= Iceland national cricket team =

Cricket team

Iceland
- Ísland
- One Day name: Iceland
- Twenty20 name: Iceland
- Association: Icelandic Cricket Association

Personnel
- Captain: Dushan Bandara
- Coach: Bala Kamallakharan
- Chairman: Samuel Gill

International Cricket Council
- ICC status: Non-member

International cricket
- First international: v Switzerland at Weybridge, England; 28 July 2018
- Official website: www.krikket.is

The Iceland national cricket team represents the country of Iceland in international cricket. They are not members of the International Cricket Council (ICC), but played their first unofficial international match in 2018.

== History ==
Formed in 2008, the team is administered by the Icelandic Cricket Association (Krikketsamband Íslands). An Icelandic team competed at the 2016 Pepsi Cup tournament in Prague, finishing fifth out of six teams.

They played their first, unofficial, international matches in July 2018 during a tour to England, when they faced Switzerland at Weybridge in Surrey. The costs of the tour were met through crowdfunding by members of the r/Cricket forum on Reddit, who became the team's official sponsors in the period 2018 to 2020. They won their first international match, a fifty-over game against Switzerland, by 215 runs.

In August 2023 they played a two-match bilateral series in Tallinn against Estonia, losing both T20 matches by 6 wickets and 79 runs, respectively.

On 10 July 2025, the national team played in the Euro Cup in Warsaw, Poland, playing the host nation, Ukraine, Latvia, and Lithuania. They won three consecutive T20 matches against Lithuania, Latvia, and Ukraine, and finished level on points with Poland, the tournament winners. In the 2026 Euro Cup in Warsaw, they again beat Lithuania and Latvia, making their first ever tournament final, which they lost to Poland.

Icelandic cricket lacks official recognition, but they plan by the year 2030 to gain associate membership of the International Cricket Council.

Iceland Cricket's X (social network) account is known for its witty social media presence, posting about cricket and global affairs in a dry, satirical tone.

== Tournament history ==
=== Valletta Cup ===
- 2019: 4th

=== Euro Cup ===
- 2025: 3rd
- 2026: finalist

== See also ==
- Cricket in Iceland
