= Cricket in Ukraine =

Ukraine
- Flag of Ukraine

International Cricket Council
- ICC status: non-member
- ICC region: Europe
- As of 1 August 2007

The Ukrainian cricket team is a fledgling team which represents the nation of Ukraine in international cricket competitions. They are not officially endorsed by the International Cricket Council (ICC) and are therefore not entitled to participate in ICC official events, however they do have an application to the European Cricket Council pending, which should see them granted affiliate status in the near future. Ukraine Cricket Federation (UCF) is an organization in development that seeks to unify Ukraine based cricket community and become the sole Ukraine governing body for the sport of cricket recognized by both the ICC and National Olympic Committee of Ukraine (NOC). The UCF structure has been established to facilitate the governance, development, regulation and promotion of cricket in Ukraine.

In July 2021, the Ukraine Cricket Federation began the process to become an Associate member of the ICC, but this was put on hold following the 2022 Russian invasion of Ukraine. A year later, the Ukraine Cricket Federation said it was ready to become an Associate member at the ICC's next board meeting.

== Governing body and tournaments ==
UCB (Ukrainian Cricket Board) is the main cricketing body of Ukraine. Ukraine's cricket calendar is full of activities with three major tournaments. The first tournament is the ASMC (Amit Sisodia Memorial Cup) which is a national tournament and has been running since 2006. In 2012, the tournament expanded to eight teams and have participated in the tournament ever since. The second tournament of the Ukrainian summer is the KCL (Kyiv Cricket League) which has been running successfully for last 7 years and is limited to teams from Kyiv Oblast (state) with allowance of 4 players from anywhere else in Ukraine and 1 Ukrainian national player in the playing XI. In 2012, 7 teams participated. The last tournament of the season is Champions' League which includes the semi-finalists of the two earlier tournaments.

== Stadium ==
Most of the matches for last 10 years are being conducted at Voskhod Stadium which is a football pitch adapted for cricket. Cricket matches are being played on an artificial turf. The matches played are in the Twenty20 format (ICC Rules).

== Finances ==
Business people or expats from south Asian countries (mainly from India) support UCB financially in order to carry out the activities.

== Dignitaries visit Ukraine ==
In the past some of the great ambassadors of game who have visited UCB are Farokh Engineer, Marvan Atapattu, Jeevan Mendis and Gayan Wijekoon.

== Hosting tours of other teams ==
In June 2012, (Manland Dads CC) became the first overseas team to tour Kyiv. The BBC has covered the event.

== Overseas tours of UCB team ==
In June 2016, UCB team has participated in the MCL (Mediterranean Cricket League) which is played in Split, Croatia and won the tournament.

In September 2017, UCB team participated in the 3rd Edition of European T20 Club Champions League organised by Warsaw Cricket Club.

== Future of cricket in Ukraine amongst Ukrainians ==
UCB along with Wayne Zschch of Kagarlyk Cricket Club has one ground at Kagarlyk, which has a cement wicket covered with Astro turf. The plan is to introduce Cricket in schools and help youngsters understand and play the game.

== Schedule of cricket for the season ==
ASMC (Amit Sisodia Memorial Cup) - 8 team tournament ); KCL (Kyiv Cricket League)- 6 to 8 team tournament; Champion's League - 4 to 6 team tournament.
