= Malta Cricket Association =

Governing body of the sport of cricket in Malta

Malta Cricket Association is the official governing body of the sport of cricket in Malta. Its current headquarters is in Marsa, Malta. Malta Cricket Association is Malta's representative at the International Cricket Council and is an associate member and has been a member of that body since 1998. It is also a member of the ICC Europe (earlier the European Cricket Council).

== History ==
The first recorded game in Malta is from 1800 between the sailors of Lord Nelson's fleet.

== Domestic competitions ==
=== T20 League ===
- 2008: Marsa CC
- 2009: Marsa CC
- 2010: Melita CC
- 2011: Melita CC
- 2012: Marsa CC
- 2013: Marsa CC (25 overs)
- 2014: Marsa CC
- 2015: Marsa CC (25 overs)
- 2016: Marsa CC (25 overs)
- 2017: Krishna CC
- 2018: Marsa CC
- 2019: Super Kings CC
- 2020: Knight Kings CC

=== T20 Winter League ===
- 2010-11: Marsa CC
- 2011-12: Melita CC
- 2012-13: Melita CC (30 overs)
- 2013-14: Krishna CC (25 overs)
- 2014-15: Melita CC
- 2015-16: Melita CC (25 overs)
- 2017: Marsa CC (30 overs)
- 2017-18: Krishna CC (25 overs)
- 2019-20: Valletta Vikings CC (50 overs)

=== T10 league ===
- 2020: Knights Kings CC
