= Russia national cricket team =

Russia

Personnel
- Captain: Ashwani Chopra
- Coach: Nic Britz

International Cricket Council
- ICC status: Terminated (2022)
- ICC region: Europe
- As of 8 October 2010

The Russian national cricket team represents the Russian Federation in international cricket. In 2012, they were officially endorsed by the International Cricket Council (ICC) as an Affiliate member and were entitled to participate in ICC Official events. Since 2017, they have been an Associate Member. In April 2018, the ICC granted all its members full Twenty20 International (T20I) status. Therefore, all Twenty20 matches played between Russia and other ICC Members after 1 January 2019 had the full T20I status. However, in July 2022, the ICC terminated Russia's membership because of their continued non-compliance with ICC membership criteria.

== History ==
The game was played in St Petersburg as early as the 1870s. In 1875, British city residents challenged the sailors of the Prince of Wales' Royal Yacht Osborne to a match.

Cricket Russia is the sole governing body of cricket in Russia. It was founded in 2004. The Russian national cricket team played their first home representative match against a touring side in 2008. Cricket Russia gained affiliation to the International Cricket Council in 2012.

The Russian Cricket Federation and its 44 regional bodies were formed in 2013. That same year, Russia participated in an international cricket tournament hosted by Malta.

In July 2019, cricket was not included in Russia's list of official sports. This meant that Cricket Russia did not receive government funding that year. However, cricket was included in a list of officially recognised sports in Russia in 2020, enabling the federation to apply for government funding.

On 18 July 2021, Russia was suspended due to continued non-compliance with ICC membership criteria. It was ordered to demonstrate compliance before the next AGM or face having its ICC membership terminated with immediate effect.

An ICC statement in July 2022 explained that Russia's 2021 suspension resulted from a failure to comply with ICC membership criteria dating back to July 2019 and that membership had been "terminated" following a failure to overcome those issues.
