= Klambratún =

Park in Reykjavík, Iceland

Coordinates: 64.04622°N 21.39973°W

Klambratún is an outdoor park and recreation area in the Hlíðar district of Reykjavík, Iceland. The Reykjavik Art Museum stands within the grounds of the park.

== Statues ==
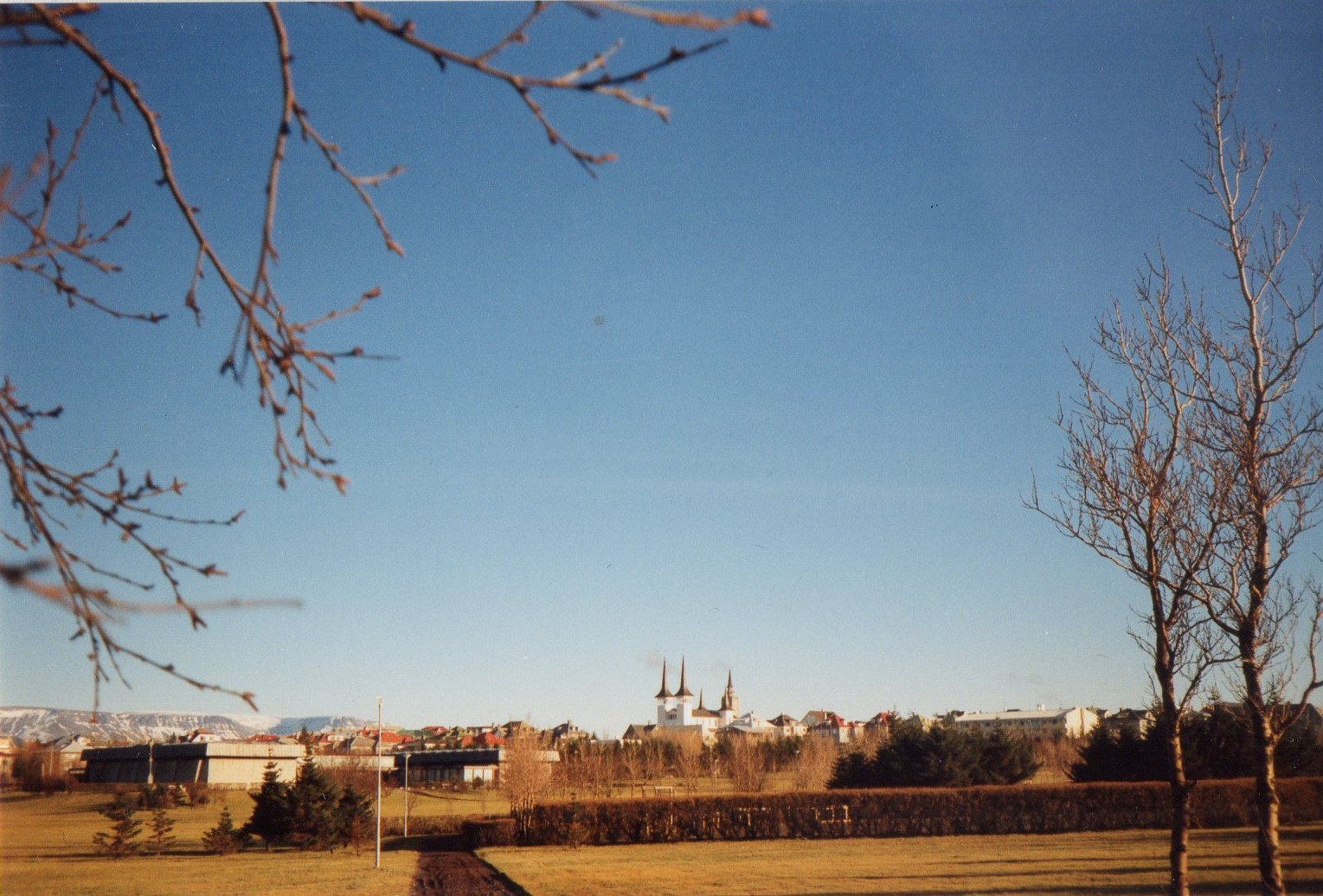
Klambratún in 2003

On the south side, a statue of the poet Einar Benediktsson by Ásmundur Sveinsson stood from the opening of the garden. The statue was moved to Höfði in 2014. There is also a bust of the poet Þorsteinn Erlingsson by Ríkardur Jónsson.
