= Cricket Russia =

Cricket governing body

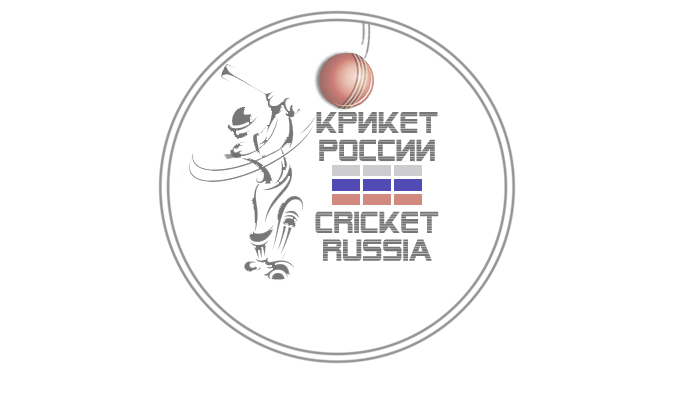
- Sport: Cricket
- Abbreviation: CR
- Founded: 2020
- Regional affiliation: Europe
- Location: Iskra Cricket ground, Selskohoziaystvennaya Street, House Number 26, Metro: Botanicheskiy sad, Moscow, Russia
- President: Alexander Sorokin, Vice President Subir Roy
- CEO: n/a
- Secretary: n/a
- Men's coach: Subir Roy
- Women's coach: n/a

Official website
- cricketrussia.ru

Cricket Russia (formerly United Cricket League) is the official governing body of the sport of cricket in Russia. Its current headquarters is in Moscow, Russia.

In July 2019, Russia's Ministry of Sport refused to recognise cricket as a sport. The sport could still be played in the country, but it was not eligible for any support from the Ministry. However, in May 2020, the Russian Government reversed its decision, recognising cricket as a sport, and therefore eligible for funding.

In July 2022, because of their continued non-compliance with ICC membership criteria, the ICC terminated Russia of membership in the organization.
