= Slovenia national cricket team =

Slovenia
- Association: Slovenian Cricket Association

Personnel
- Captain: Izaz Ali
- Coach: Syed Hassaan Ahmed

International Cricket Council
- ICC status: Associate member (2017); Affiliate member (2005)
- ICC region: Europe
ICC Rankings	Current	Best-ever
T20I	96th	95th (07 June 2025)

International cricket
- First international: 21 August 2000 v Austria at Seebarn Cricket Centre, Austria

T20 Internationals
- First T20I: v. Austria at Kerava National Cricket Ground, Kerava; 25 July 2022
- Last T20I: v. Malta at Happy Valley Ground 2, Episkopi; 22 May 2026
T20Is	Played	Won/Lost
Total	24	3/21 (0 ties, 0 no results)
This year	4	0/4 (0 ties, 0 no results)
T20I kit
- As of 22 May 2026

The Slovenian national cricket team represents Slovenia in international cricket. The national organising body in Slovenia, the Slovenian Cricket Association, became an affiliate member of the International Cricket Council (ICC) in 2005 and an associate member in 2017.

In April 2018, the ICC decided to grant full Twenty20 International (T20I) status to all its members. Therefore, all Twenty20 matches played between Slovenia and other ICC members after 1 January 2019 have T20I status.

== History ==
=== Early days ===
It is thought that cricket was introduced to Slovenia in 1974, after Borut Čegovnik, then a 13-year-old boy from the mountain town of Mežica, was introduced to the sport on an extended visit to his penpal in Birchington-on-Sea, Kent. He received extensive coaching from his host's father, and went back to his home with a selection of cricket equipment having decided that cricket was just the thing for his town. Seventeen, mainly single-wicket, tournaments were held between 1974 and 1982, with 24 local boys playing. The game was played in the village until 1982, when several of the ringleaders moved to the Slovenian capital, Ljubljana.

=== Modern era ===
Cricket resurfaced in Slovenia in 1997 when the Ljubljana Cricket Club was formed. The first game was played between a Slovenian President's XI and a visiting club from The Hague. That game was attended by the then Slovenian president Milan Kučan. Friendly games against sides from various countries and the British Embassy continued, and Ljubljana Cricket Club began to compete in Austrian club cricket.

In 2000, the Slovenian national cricket team made its debut in the European Representative Championships. They finished fourth in the tournament, and came second in 2002. They hosted the tournament in 2004, again finishing in fourth place. This tournament was replaced in 2006 by the Division Four of the European Championship, where Slovenia finished in fourth place out of the four teams. They will retain their Division Four place in 2009.

== Records and statistics ==
International Match Summary — Slovenia

Last updated 22 May 2026

Playing Record
Format	M	W	L	T	NR	Inaugural Match
Twenty20 Internationals	24	3	21	0	0	25 July 2022

=== Twenty20 International ===
T20I record versus other nations

Records complete to T20I #3896. Last updated 22 May 2026.

Opponent	M	W	L	T	NR	First match	First win
vs Associate Members
Austria	6	0	6	0	0	25 July 2022	
Bulgaria	1	0	1	0	0	27 July 2022	
Gibraltar	1	1	0	0	0	10 July 2024	10 July 2024
Guernsey	2	0	2	0	0	28 July 2022	
Hungary	3	0	3	0	0	21 June 2025	
Luxembourg	1	0	1	0	0	30 July 2022	
Malta	1	0	1	0	0	22 May 2026	
Norway	1	0	1	0	0	9 July 2024	
Serbia	6	2	4	0	0	29 June 2024	29 June 2024
Sweden	2	0	2	0	0	13 July 2024	

=== Other results ===
For a list of selected international matches played by Slovenia, see Cricket Archive.

== Grounds ==
Location of international cricket matches played in Slovenia

== Leading figures ==
- Robert Crawford (born 26 February 1960) is an English-born Slovenian cricketer. He has represented Slovenia since 2002. He has played for Slovenia in the ECC Representative Festival of 2002 and the ECC Representative Championship of 2004. Most recently he has appeared with his team in Division Four of the 2006 European Championship. He is an opening batsman and slow bowler.
- Lalantha Karunatilake (born 8 March 1973) is a Sri Lankan-born Slovenian cricketer. He has represented Slovenia since 2004. He has played for Slovenia in the ECC Representative Championship of 2004. Most recently he has appeared with his team in Division Four of the 2006 European Championship. He is a top-order batsman and a spin bowler.
- Borut Čegovnik played for Slovenia in the ECC Representative Championship of 2004 and is the President of the Slovenian Cricket Association.
- Brad Eve (born 11 November 1967) is an Australian-born Slovenian cricketer. He is a left-handed batsman and a right-arm fast-medium-bowler who has played for Slovenia since 2000. He first played for Slovenia at the ECC Representative Festival of 2000, where in four matches he had an average of less than one run per innings. Two years later he played in the same competition, and, in 2004, he played at the ECC Representative Championship. Most recently he has played in Division Four of the 2006 European Championship for his adopted country.
- Tom Furness (born 8 November 1978) is an English-born Slovenian cricketer. He has vice captained Slovenia since 2004. He has played in the ECC Representative Championship of 2004, and most recently appeared with his team in Division Four of the 2006 European Championship. Furness has appeared as an opening batsman since his introduction into Slovenian cricket, and now shares this position with Robert Crawford.
- Egon Jakofčič (born 31 October 1967) is a Slovenian cricketer. He has played for Slovenia since 2004. He first represented the Slovenian team during 2004, when he made five appearances in the ECC Representative Championship, as a lower-order/tailend batsman, and, two years later, appeared in the Belgium-based European Championship, for which Slovenia were placed in Division Four. He is also a right-arm medium bowler.
- Robert Jakofčič (born 19 May 1970) is an Australian-born Slovenian cricketer. He has played for Slovenia since 2006. He appeared as a lower-order batsman in two matches during the 2006 European Championships.
- Mark Oman (born 5 September 1966) is an Australian-born Slovenian cricketer. He has captained Slovenia since 2000. He is an opening batsman and right-arm fast-medium bowler. He first represented Slovenia at the 2000 ECC Representative Festival, contributing in his first match to a second-wicket partnership of 72 before a Slovenian batting collapse. He later represented Slovenia at the 2002 Representative Festival and the 2004 Representative Championship, and has most recently played for his adopted country in Division Four of the European Championship. He has made significant contributions to the development of cricket in Slovenia.

== Current squad ==
The following list contains the 14 players in Slovenia's squad for the 2022–23 ICC Men's T20 World Cup Europe Qualifier

- Ayyaz Ahmed Qureshi (c)
- Marko Harry Oman (vc)
- Awais Ikram
- Bhagwant Singh Sandhu
- Dileep Kumar Pallekonda
- Mazhar Khan (wk)
- Muhammad Shahid Arshad
- Muhammad Shoaib Naseem Siddiqui
- Nilesh Laxman Ujawe
- Primoz Pustoslemsek
- Ramanjot Singh
- Sudhakar Koppolu
- Taher Mohammad (wk)
- Waqar Khan (wk)

== See also ==
- List of Slovenia Twenty20 International cricketers
