= Tallinn Hippodrome =

Equestrian track in Tallinn

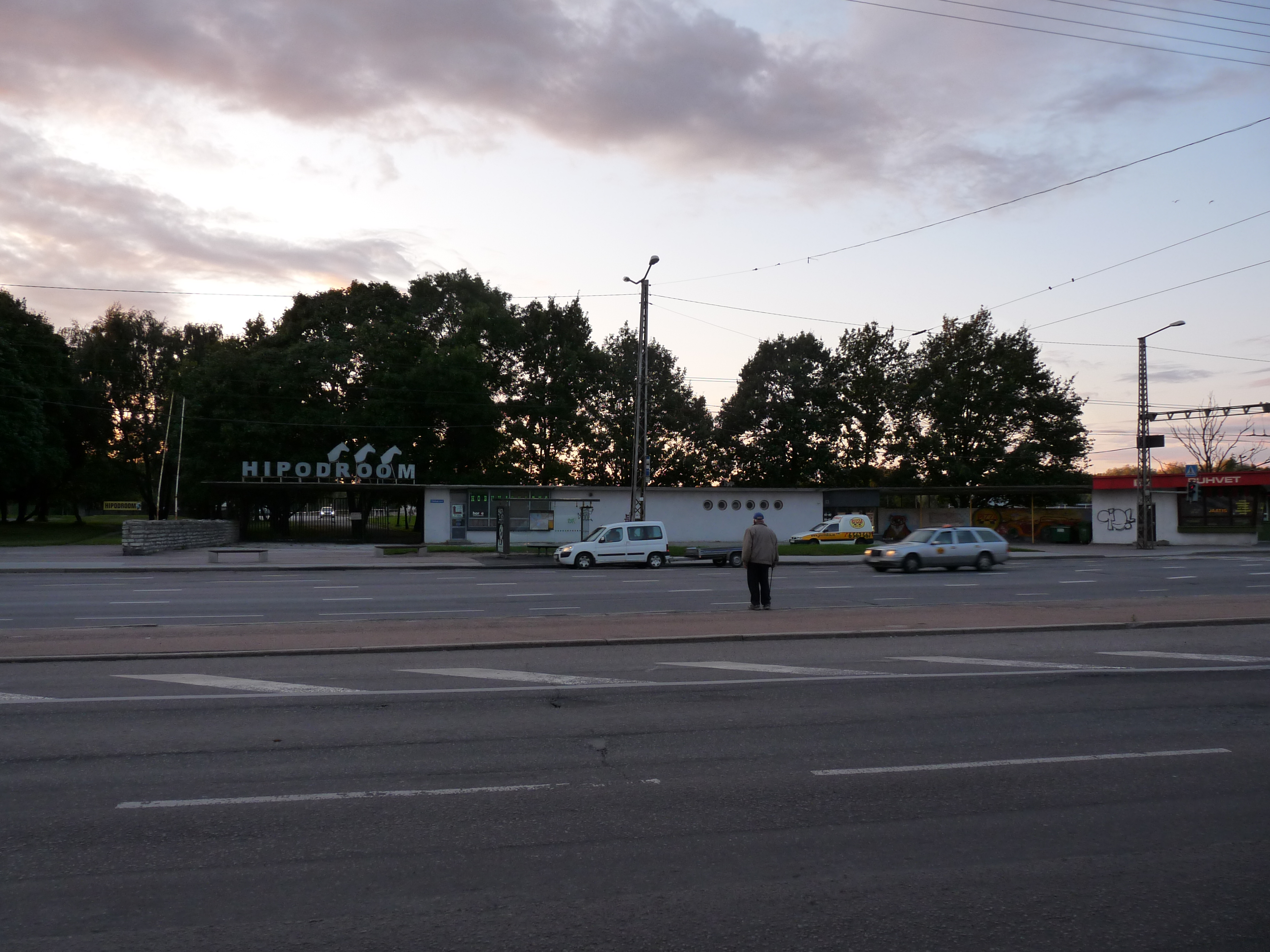
- Entrance to the Tallinn Hippodrome
- Interactive map of Tallinn Hippodrome
- Location: Paldiski maantee 50, Tallinn, Estonia
- Coordinates: 59.432335°N 24.705484°E
- Date opened: 25 November 1923
- Date closed: 2022
- Race type: harness racing
- Notable races: Estonian Trotting Derby

The Tallinn Hippodrome (Estonian: Tallinna Hipodroom) was a harness racing track in Tallinn, Estonia. The track was located in the eastern part of the city at the Põhja-Tallinn district. It was established in 1923. Racing events were held on every other Saturday.

As of 2022, the racing track was closed and the site was being redeveloped as a business building including the headquarters of Swedbank and telecoms firm Elisa.

== Gallery ==
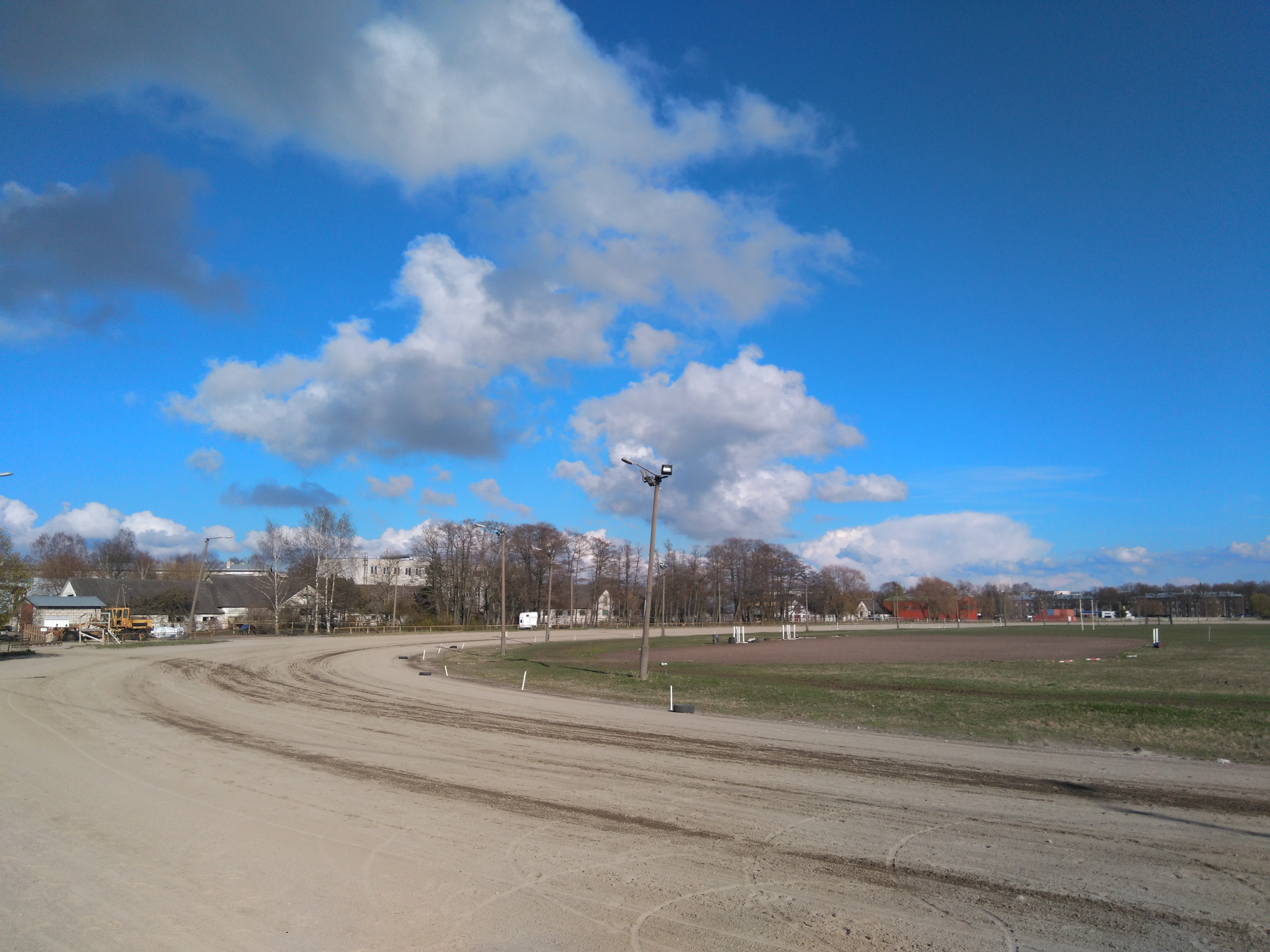

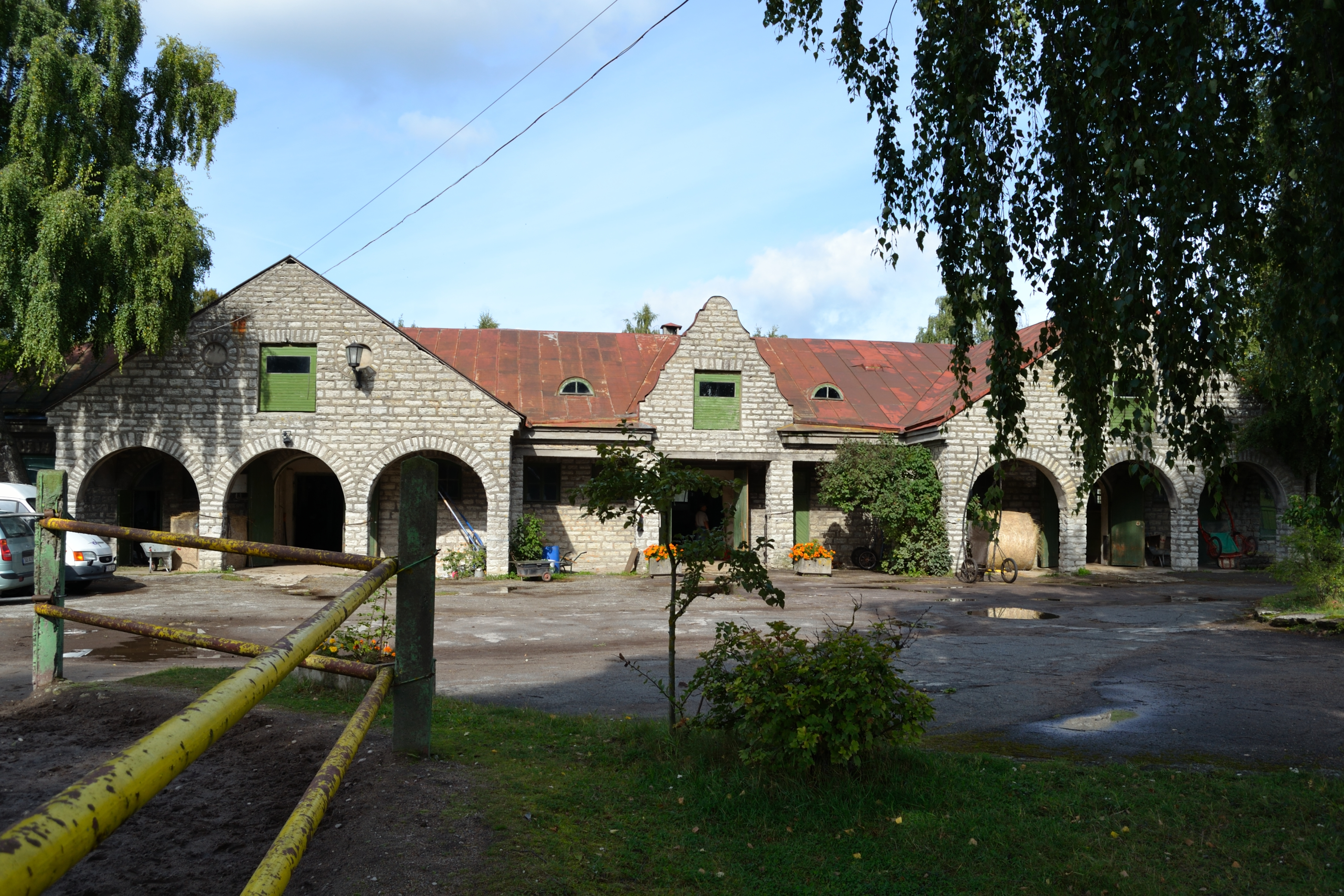

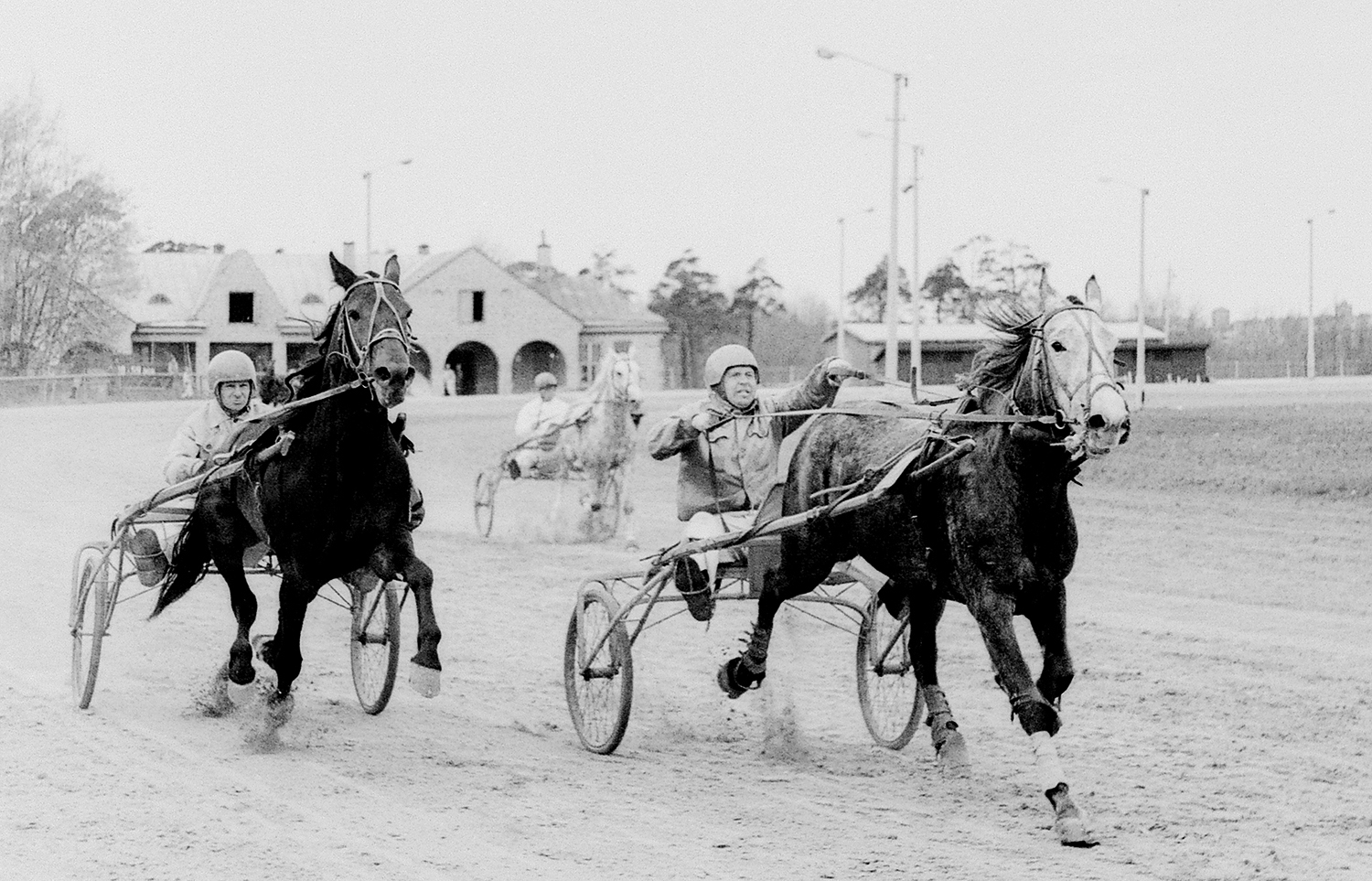

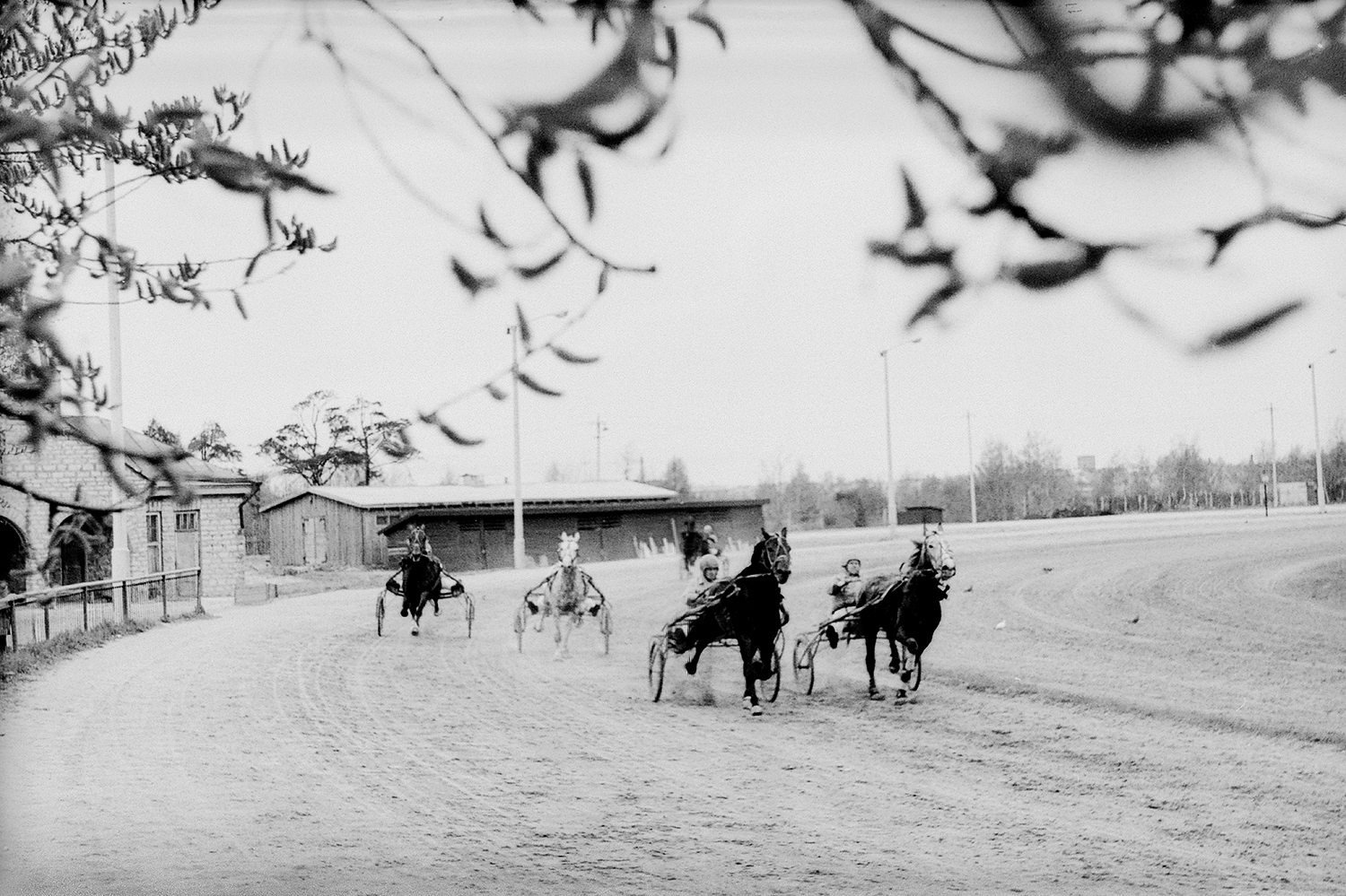
