= European Cricket Council =

Defunct international cricket organization

- Official logo of the defunct council
- Abbreviation: ECC
- Successor: ICC Europe
- Formation: 1997; 29 years ago
- Dissolved: 2010
- Purpose: Cricket administration (historical)
- Headquarters: London, England
- Members: 34 national associations (at dissolution)
- Key people: Roger Knight (Last Chairman)
- Parent organization: ICC

The European Cricket Council (ECC) was an international governing body that oversaw the administration, development, and promotion of cricket in European nations outside of England. For the duration of the ECC's existence, England was the sole Full Member of the ICC in the region.

In 2008, as part of a global restructuring strategy by the ICC, all administrative and development operations of the ECC were absorbed by the newly formed ICC Europe. The ECC was officially dissolved as an independent legal entity in 2010.

== History ==
Cricket in continental Europe dates back to the late 18th century, with historical records indicating the game was first played by Admiral Nelson's troops and sailors stationed in Naples in 1793. The sport enjoyed popularity at an amateur level throughout the 19th and early 20th centuries, leading to the formation of prominent multi-sport clubs, such as the Milan Cricket and Football Club (the precursor to the football club A.C. Milan). However, the rise of totalitarian regimes across continental Europe in the 1920s and 1930s led to a severe decline in the sport's infrastructure.

The ECC was established in 1997 to replace the highly bureaucratic European Cricket Federation. Founded by 14 initial member associations, the council expanded to include 34 member nations before its ultimate dissolution. During its operational tenure, the ECC oversaw the rise of associate powers such as Scotland, Ireland, and The Netherlands, all of whom qualified for major global tournaments, including the 2007 Cricket World Cup and the 2009 Twenty20 World Cup. Following the dissolution of the ECC, Ireland was subsequently elevated to ICC Full Member (Test) status on 22 June 2017.

== Activities and Legacy ==
Based at Lord's in London, England, the ECC operated as the regional authority for Europe under the auspices of the ICC. The council's structural mandate focused on expanding player participation, upgrading facility infrastructure, organizing regional high-performance clinics, and overseeing an official continental tournament pathway. It was additionally responsible for the administration of cricket within Israel, which aligns with European sporting federations for geopolitical reasons.

Key tournament structures organized by the ECC included the historic European Cricket Championship (a 50-over national tournament), alongside dedicated indoor, junior, and women's events. The ECC's developmental programs—which trained regional umpires, coaches, and sports medicine practitioners—were financed heavily by ICC global event distributions and logistically supported by the England and Wales Cricket Board (ECB) and the Marylebone Cricket Club (MCC).

=== Transition to ICC Europe ===
In 2008, the ICC integrated the independent council directly into its global hierarchy as ICC Europe, mirroring regional structures like ICC East Asia-Pacific and ICC Americas. The independent legal entity of the ECC was formally wound up in 2010.

As of May 2026, the national federations originally nurtured by the ECC are fully governed by ICC Europe. Following the global abolition of "Affiliate" status by the ICC in 2017, the European region consists of two Full Members (England and Ireland) and 32 Associate Members, who participate in centralized, multi-tiered pathway events—such as the ICC Men's T20 World Cup Europe Sub-Regional Qualifiers—to earn berths in global ICC events.

== See also ==
- ICC Europe
- List of International Cricket Council members
