= 2020 T20I Balkan Cup =

International cricket tournament

2020 Balkan Cup
	Romania	Bulgaria
- Dates: 16 – 18 October 2020
Captains	Ramesh Satheesan	Prakash Mishra

Twenty20 International series
- Results: Romania won the 4-match series 3–1
Most runs	Ramesh Satheesan (165)	Bakhtiar Tahiri (129)
Most wickets	Shantanu Vashisht (4)	Prakash Mishra (6)

The Bulgaria cricket team toured Romania in October 2020 to contest the Balkan Cup over four Twenty20 International (T20I) matches. The matches were played between 16 and 18 October 2020 at the Moara Vlasiei Cricket Ground in Ilfov County. Romania's only previous official T20I matches were played in August 2019 during the Continental Cup, which was also hosted at the Moara Vlasiei Ground. Bulgaria lost their previous series against Malta a month prior to this tour. Bulgaria won the opening match, but Romania took both matches on the second day. The Bulgarians were bowled out for only 60 runs in the final game and Romania went on to claim the series 3–1.

== Squads ==
Romania	Bulgaria
Ramesh Satheesan (c); Waqar Abbasi; Asif Bevinje; Petre Danci; Pavel Florin; Laurentiu Gherasim; Marian Gherasim; Imran Haider (wk); Ijaz Hussain; Aftab Kayani; Gohar Manan; Patras Masih; Satvik Nadigotla (wk); Sivakumar Periyalwar; Vasu Saini; Abdul Shakoor; Sami Ullah; Shantanu Vashisht; Cosmin Zavoiu	Prakash Mishra (c); Atagul Ahmadhel; Sulaiman Ali; Rohan Bhavesh Patel; Kevin D'Souza; Aravinda De Silva; Kiran Dasan (wk); Boiko Ivanov; Hristo Ivanov (wk); Ivaylo Katzarski; Hristo Lakov (vc); Nikolay Nankov; Dimo Nikolov; Asad Ali Rehemtulla; Bakhtiar Tahiri; Delrick Varghese

== T20I series ==
=== 1st T20I ===
16 October 2020
14:00
Scorecard

Bulgaria; 128/5 (20 overs)	v	Romania; 95 (17.4 overs)
Bakhtiar Tahiri 41 (36); Sami Ullah 2/23 (4 overs)		Abdul Shakoor 20 (25); Sulaiman Ali 2/8 (2.4 overs)

Bulgaria won by 33 runs
Moara Vlasiei Cricket Ground, Ilfov County
Umpires: Andrew Begg (Rom) and Syed Atif Naqvi (Rom)
Player of the match: Bakhtiar Tahiri (Bul)

- Bulgaria won the toss and elected to bat.
- Asif Bevinje, Marian Gherasim, Aftab Kayani, Vasu Saini, Sami Ullah (Rom) and Asad Ali Rehemtulla (Bul) all made their T20I debuts.
- Marian Gherasim (Rom), at the age of 14 years and 16 days, became the youngest cricketer to play in a men's T20I match.

=== 2nd T20I ===
17 October 2020
10:00
Scorecard

Romania; 148/2 (15 overs)	v	Bulgaria; 96/6 (15 overs)
Ramesh Satheesan 92* (50); Rohan Bhavesh Patel 1/22 (3 overs)		Sulaiman Ali 33 (28); Pavel Florin 2/10 (1 over)

Romania won by 52 runs
Moara Vlasiei Cricket Ground, Ilfov County
Umpires: Dharmendra Manani (Rom) and Taranjeet Singh (Rom)
Player of the match: Ramesh Satheesan (Rom)

- Romania won the toss and elected to bat.
- The match was reduced to 15 overs per side due to rain.
- Patras Masih (Rom) made his T20I debut.

=== 3rd T20I ===
17 October 2020
14:00
Scorecard

Romania; 209/6 (20 overs)	v	Bulgaria; 175/6 (20 overs)
Ramesh Satheesan 67 (32); Dimo Nikolov 2/27 (3 overs)		Bakhtiar Tahiri 66 (44); Waqar Abbasi 2/30 (3 overs)

Romania won by 34 runs
Moara Vlasiei Cricket Ground, Ilfov County
Umpires: Dharmendra Manani (Rom) and Taranjeet Singh (Rom)
Player of the match: Ramesh Satheesan (Rom)

- Romania won the toss and elected to bat.
- Waqar Abbasi (Rom) made his T20I debut.

=== 4th T20I ===
18 October 2020
10:00
Scorecard

Bulgaria; 60 (14.3 overs)	v	Romania; 61/4 (9.4 overs)
Hristo Ivanov 13 (13); Shantanu Vashisht 3/11 (4 overs)		Cosmin Zavoiu 14 (12); Prakash Mishra 2/8 (2 overs)

Romania won by 6 wickets
Moara Vlasiei Cricket Ground, Ilfov County
Umpires: Aravinda de Silva (Bul) and Dharmendra Manani (Rom)
Player of the match: Shantanu Vashisht (Rom)

- Bulgaria won the toss and elected to bat.
