= 2021 Continental Cup (cricket) =

International cricket tournament

- Dates: 2 – 5 September 2021
- Administrator: Cricket Romania
- Cricket format: Twenty20 International
- Tournament format(s): Group round-robin and play-offs
- Host: Romania
- Champions: Romania
- Runners-up: Luxembourg
- Participants: 6
- Matches: 11
- Most runs: (Hungary) Zeeshan Kukikhel (263)
- Most wickets: (Luxembourg) Vikram Vijh (9)

The 2021 Continental Cup was a Twenty20 International (T20I) cricket tournament that took place at the Moara Vlasiei Cricket Ground in Ilfov County, Romania, in the first week of September 2021. Austria won the previous edition in 2019, but did not return to defend the title in 2021. The participating nations were the hosts Romania, along with Bulgaria, Czech Republic, Hungary, Luxembourg and Malta. Hungary played their first ever official men's T20I match during the tournament. The teams were split into two groups, with the top two in each group progressing to the semi-finals.

Luxembourg topped Group A to set up a semi-final against Hungary, while Romania earned a semi-final against Malta after winning Group B. Luxembourg and Romania advanced to the final by winning their semi-final matches, while the Czech Republic finished in fifth place after defeating Bulgaria in a play-off. On the last day of the tournament, Romania defeated Luxembourg in the final by 33 runs, before Hungary secured third place with a comfortable eight-wicket win over Malta.

== Squads ==
| Bulgaria | Czech Republic | Hungary | Luxembourg | Malta | Romania |
|---|---|---|---|---|---|
| Prakash Mishra (c); Agagyul Ahmadhel; Jacob Albin; Kevin D'Souza; Aravinda De Silva; Akshay Harikumar; Vasil Hristov; Mukul Kadyan; Ivaylo Katzarski; Hristo Lakov; Dimo Nikolov; Omar Rassol (wk); Bakhtiar Tahiri; Delrick Varghese; Nikolay Yordanov | Arun Ashokan (c); Kushalkumar Mendon (vc); Hilal Ahmad (wk); Naveed Ahmed; Sabawoon Davizi; Kyle Gilham; Sahil Grover (wk); Vyshakh Jagannivasan; Kayul Mehta; Smit Patel; Satyajit Sengupta; Ali Waqar; Sameera Waththage; Sudesh Wickramasekara | Abhijeet Ahuja (c); Khaibar Deldar (vc); Abhishek Ahuja (wk); Satyadeep Ashwathnarayana (wk); Mark Fontaine; Salman Khan; Abishek Kheterpal; Zeeshan Kukikhel; Sanjay Kumar; Nishanta Liyanage; Harshvardhan Mandhyan; Zahir Mohammed; Sandeep Mohandas; Asanka Weligamage; Ali Yalmaz | Joost Mees (c); James Barker; Timothy Barker; Marcus Cope; William Cope; Amit Dhingra; Mohit Dixit; Amit Halbhavi; Atif Kamal; Pankaj Malav; Advyth Manepalli (wk); Ankush Nanda; Vikram Vijh; Tony Whiteman | Bikram Arora (c); Amar Sharma (vc); Waseem Abbas; Samuel Aquilina (wk); Basil George; John Grima; Zeeshan Khan; Niraj Khanna; Haroon Mughal; Bilal Muhammad; Indika Perera; Suhrid Roy; Samuel Stanislaus; Varun Thamotharam; Lee Tuck | Ramesh Satheesan (c); Waqar Abbasi; Asif Bevinje; Pavel Florin; Imran Haider (wk); Ijaz Hussain; Aftab Kayani; Gohar Manan; Dharmendra Manani; Satvik Nadigotla (wk); Sivakumar Periyalwar; Vasu Saini; Abdul Shakoor (wk); Taranjeet Singh; Sami Ullah; Shantanu Vashisht; Cosmin Zavoiu |

== Group stage ==
=== Group A ===
| Teams | P | W | L | T | NR | Pts | NRR | Status |
|---|---|---|---|---|---|---|---|---|
| Luxembourg | 2 | 2 | 0 | 0 | 0 | 4 | +1.692 | Advanced to the semi-finals |
| Malta | 2 | 1 | 1 | 0 | 0 | 2 | +1.484 | Advanced to the semi-finals |
| Bulgaria | 2 | 0 | 2 | 0 | 0 | 0 | –3.549 | Advanced to the 5th place playoff |

2 September 2021
09:00
Scorecard

| Luxembourg; 187/4 (20 overs) | v | Bulgaria; 125 (18.4 overs) |
| Timothy Barker 78 (59); Mukul Kadyan 2/34 (4 overs) | | Kevin D'Souza 31 (19); Mohit Dixit 3/19 (4 overs) |

Luxembourg won by 62 runs
Moara Vlasiei Cricket Ground, Ilfov County
Umpires: Andrew Begg (Rom) and Steve Tripp (Bel)
Player of the match: Timothy Barker (Lux)

- Bulgaria won the toss and elected to field.
- Vasil Hristov, Mukul Kadyan, Omar Rassol (Bul) and Amit Halbhavi (Lux) all made their T20I debuts.

2 September 2021
15:30
Scorecard

| Malta; 128/9 (20 overs) | v | Luxembourg; 131/6 (19.4 overs) |
| Varun Thamotharam 28 (22); Vikram Vijh 4/19 (3 overs) | | Tony Whiteman 55* (54); Bilal Muhammad 2/22 (4 overs) |

Luxembourg won by 4 wickets
Moara Vlasiei Cricket Ground, Ilfov County
Umpires: Syed Atif Naqvi (Rom) and Steve Tripp (Bel)
Player of the match: Vikram Vijh (Lux)

- Luxembourg won the toss and elected to field.
- Amit Dhingra (Lux) and Basil George (Mlt) both made their T20I debuts.

3 September 2021
12:30
Scorecard

| Bulgaria; 112/9 (20 overs) | v | Malta; 113/3 (11.4 overs) |
| Hristo Lakov 62* (60); Bilal Muhammad 4/10 (4 overs) | | Bikram Arora 49* (39); Hristo Lakov 2/30 (4 overs) |

Malta won by 7 wickets
Moara Vlasiei Cricket Ground, Ilfov County
Umpires: Arun Chandrasekaran (Rom) and Andrew Begg (Rom)
Player of the match: Bilal Muhammad (Mlt)

- Bulgaria won the toss and elected to bat.

=== Group B ===
| Teams | P | W | L | T | NR | Pts | NRR | Status |
|---|---|---|---|---|---|---|---|---|
| Romania | 2 | 2 | 0 | 0 | 0 | 4 | +1.075 | Advanced to the semi-finals |
| Hungary | 2 | 1 | 1 | 0 | 0 | 2 | –0.075 | Advanced to the semi-finals |
| Czech Republic | 2 | 0 | 2 | 0 | 0 | 0 | –1.000 | Advanced to the 5th place playoff |

2 September 2021
12:30
Scorecard

| Hungary; 165/6 (20 overs) | v | Czech Republic; 160/7 (20 overs) |
| Zeeshan Kukikhel 75 (49); Kayul Mehta 3/18 (3 overs) | | Sudesh Wickramasekara 58 (41); Zeeshan Kukikhel 2/27 (3 overs) |

Hungary won by 5 runs
Moara Vlasiei Cricket Ground, Ilfov County
Umpires: Andrew Begg (Rom) and Syed Atif Naqvi (Rom)
Player of the match: Zeeshan Kukikhel (Hun)

- Czech Republic won the toss and elected to field.
- Vyshakh Jagannivasan, Kayul Mehta (Cze), Abhijeet Ahuja, Satyadeep Ashwathnarayana, Khaibar Deldar, Abishek Kheterpal, Zeeshan Kukikhel, Nishanta Liyanage, Harshvardhan Mandhyan, Zahir Mohammed, Sandeep Mohandas, Asanka Weligamage and Ali Yalmaz (Hun) all made their T20I debuts.

3 September 2021
09:00
Scorecard

| Romania; 211/8 (20 overs) | v | Czech Republic; 176 (19.3 overs) |
| Satvik Nadigotla 38 (23); Kyle Gilham 2/34 (4 overs) | | Arun Ashokan 51 (30); Sami Ullah 3/30 (4 overs) |

Romania won by 35 runs
Moara Vlasiei Cricket Ground, Ilfov County
Umpires: Syed Atif Naqvi (Rom) and Steve Tripp (Bel)
Player of the match: Sami Ullah (Rom)

- Romania won the toss and elected to bat.

3 September 2021
15:30
Scorecard

| Romania; 195/6 (20 overs) | v | Hungary; 187 (19.5 overs) |
| Ramesh Satheesan 76 (41); Harshvardhan Mandhyan 3/33 (4 overs) | | Zeeshan Kukikhel 76 (41); Asif Bevinje 5/30 (4 overs) |

Romania won by 8 runs
Moara Vlasiei Cricket Ground, Ilfov County
Umpires: Syed Atif Naqvi (Rom) and Steve Tripp (Bel)
Player of the match: Asif Bevinje (Rom)

- Romania won the toss and elected to bat.
- Mark Fontaine and Sanjay Kumar (Hun) both made their T20I debuts.
- Asif Bevinje became the first bowler for Romania to take a five-wicket haul in men's T20Is.

== Playoffs ==
=== 5th place playoff ===
4 September 2021
09:00
Scorecard

| Bulgaria; 137/6 (20 overs) | v | Czech Republic; 141/3 (16.2 overs) |
| Hristo Lakov 64* (58); Naveed Ahmed 3/17 (4 overs) | | Vyshakh Jagannivasan 55 (41); Jacob Albin 1/20 (2 overs) |

Czech Republic won by 7 wickets
Moara Vlasiei Cricket Ground, Ilfov County
Umpires: Abhay Malyan (Rom) and Steve Tripp (Bel)
Player of the match: Naveed Ahmed (Cze)

- Bulgaria won the toss and elected to bat.
- Akshay Harikumar (Bul) made his T20I debut.

=== Semi-finals ===
==== 1st Semi-final ====
4 September 2021
12:30
Scorecard

| Luxembourg; 179/6 (20 overs) | v | Hungary; 177/9 (20 overs) |
| Joost Mees 43 (29); Zeeshan Kukikhel 3/37 (4 overs) | | Satyadeep Ashwathnarayana 41* (19); Vikram Vijh 3/21 (3.3 overs) |

Luxembourg won by 2 runs
Moara Vlasiei Cricket Ground, Ilfov County
Umpires: Andrew Begg (Rom) and Abhay Malyan (Rom)
Player of the match: Vikram Vijh (Lux)

- Hungary won the toss and elected to field.

==== 2nd Semi-final ====
4 September 2021
15:30
Scorecard

| Romania; 202/8 (20 overs) | v | Malta; 166/8 (20 overs) |
| Taranjeet Singh 91 (57); Waseem Abbas 5/37 (4 overs) | | Bikram Arora 42 (38); Pavel Florin 2/3 (1 over) |

Romania won by 36 runs
Moara Vlasiei Cricket Ground, Ilfov County
Umpires: Syed Atif Naqvi (Rom) and Steve Tripp (Bel)
Player of the match: Taranjeet Singh (Rom)

- Malta won the toss and elected to field.
- Waseem Abbas became the first bowler for Malta to take a five-wicket haul in men's T20Is.

=== 3rd place playoff ===
5 September 2021
13:00
Scorecard

| Malta; 170/5 (20 overs) | v | Hungary; 171/2 (18.2 overs) |
| Basil George 48 (46); Abishek Kheterpal 2/35 (4 overs); Zeeshan Kukikhel 2/35 (4 overs) | | Zeeshan Kukikhel 82 (42); Bikram Arora 1/19 (3.2 overs) |

Hungary won by 8 wickets
Moara Vlasiei Cricket Ground, Ilfov County
Umpires: Andrew Begg (Rom) and Abhay Malyan (Rom)
Player of the match: Zeeshan Kukikhel (Hun)

- Hungary won the toss and elected to field.

=== Final ===
5 September 2021
09:30
Scorecard

| Romania; 156 (19.5 overs) | v | Luxembourg; 123/9 (20 overs) |
| Satvik Nadigotla 55 (38); Vikram Vijh 2/24 (3.5 overs) | | Advyth Manepalli 22 (19); Aftab Kayani 2/7 (2 overs) |

Romania won by 33 runs
Moara Vlasiei Cricket Ground, Ilfov County
Umpires: Syed Atif Naqvi (Rom) and Steve Tripp (Bel)
Player of the match: Asif Bevinje (Rom)

- Romania won the toss and elected to bat.
