= 2022 Sofia Twenty20 =

International cricket tour

	Bulgaria	Serbia
- Dates: 24 – 26 June 2022
Captains	Prakash Mishra (Note: Hristo Lakov captained Bulgaria for the 3rd T20I.)	Robin Vitas

Twenty20 International series
- Results: Bulgaria won the 4-match series 4–0
Most runs	Kevin D'Souza (197)	Leslie Dunbar (284)
Most wickets	Mukul Kadyan (5); Asad Ali Rehemtulla (5)	Matija Sarenac (4)

The 2022 Sofia Twenty20 tournament was a Twenty20 International (T20I) cricket tournament which was held in Sofia, Bulgaria, in June 2022. This was the second edition of the Sofia Twenty20; the 2021 tournament was contested by four nations, but the 2022 edition took the form of a four-match bilateral series between Bulgaria and Serbia. The series was played at the National Sports Academy in Sofia. The series provided both teams with preparation for the 2022–23 ICC Men's T20 World Cup Europe Qualifier subregional tournaments.

== Squads ==
Bulgaria	Serbia
Prakash Mishra (c); Hristo Lakov (vc); Atagul Ahmadhel; Jacob Albin; Sulaiman Ali; Aravinda De Silva; Kevin D'Souza; Vasil Hristov; Saim Hussain (wk); Mukul Kadyan; Ivaylo Katzarski; Ahsan Khan; Fayaz Mohammad; Sandeep Nair; Dimo Nikolov; Karthik Pillai; Omar Rassol (wk); Asad Ali Rehemtulla; Bakhtiar Tahiri; Delrick Varghese	Robin Vitas (c); Mark Pavlovic (vc); Wintley Burton; Alexander Dizija; Aleksa Djorovic; Bogdan Dugic; Leslie Dunbar (wk); Alister Gajic; Simo Ivetic; Nicholas Johns-Wickberg; Matthew Kostic; Ayo Mene-Ejegi; Stefan Nerandzic; Matija Sarenac; Slobodan Tosic; Nemanja Zimonjic; Vukasin Zimonjic

== T20I series ==
=== 1st T20I ===
24 June 2022
17:00
Scorecard

Serbia; 225/6 (20 overs)	v	Bulgaria; 229/4 (19.3 overs)
Wintley Burton 83 (27); Ahsan Khan 2/18 (3 overs)		Kevin D'Souza 92* (34); Nicholas Johns-Wickberg 2/39 (3.3 overs)

Bulgaria won by 6 wickets
National Sports Academy, Sofia
Umpires: Ivan Dimitrov (Bul) and Velguo Vilimonovic (Srb)
Player of the match: Kevin D'Souza (Bul)

- Bulgaria won the toss and elected to field.
- Matthew Kostic, Ayo Mene-Ejegi and Robin Vitas (Srb) all made their T20I debuts.

=== 2nd T20I ===
25 June 2022
13:30
Scorecard

Serbia; 194/8 (20 overs)	v	Bulgaria; 199/5 (19 overs)
Leslie Dunbar 89 (45); Mukul Kadyan 2/28 (4 overs)		Aravinda De Silva 58 (36); Matija Sarenac 2/31 (3 overs)

Bulgaria won by 5 wickets
National Sports Academy, Sofia
Umpires: Ivan Dimitrov (Bul) and Velguo Vilimonovic (Srb)
Player of the match: Aravinda De Silva (Bul)

- Serbia won the toss and elected to bat.
- Alexander Dizija (Srb) made his T20I debut.

=== 3rd T20I ===
25 June 2022
17:00
Scorecard

Serbia; 185/4 (20 overs)	v	Bulgaria; 122/1 (11.5 overs)
Alexander Dizija 92 (56); Mukul Kadyan 2/20 (3 overs)		Saim Hussain 57* (27); Matija Sarenac 1/16 (2 overs)

Bulgaria won by 40 runs (DLS method)
National Sports Academy, Sofia
Umpires: Ivan Dimitrov (Bul) and Velguo Vilimonovic (Srb)
Player of the match: Saim Hussain (Bul)

- Serbia won the toss and elected to bat.
- No further play was possible due to rain.

=== 4th T20I ===
26 June 2022
10:00
Scorecard

Serbia; 242/4 (20 overs)	v	Bulgaria; 246/4 (19.4 overs)
Leslie Dunbar 117 (50); Hristo Lakov 2/32 (4 overs)		Saim Hussain 71 (24); Wintley Burton 1/16 (2.4 overs)

Bulgaria won by 6 wickets
National Sports Academy, Sofia
Umpires: Ivan Dimitrov (Bul) and Velguo Vilimonovic (Srb)
Player of the match: Hristo Lakov (Bul)

- Bulgaria won the toss and elected to field.
- Bulgaria's 246/4 was the highest score achieved by a team batting second in a T20I.
