= List of Twenty20 International records =

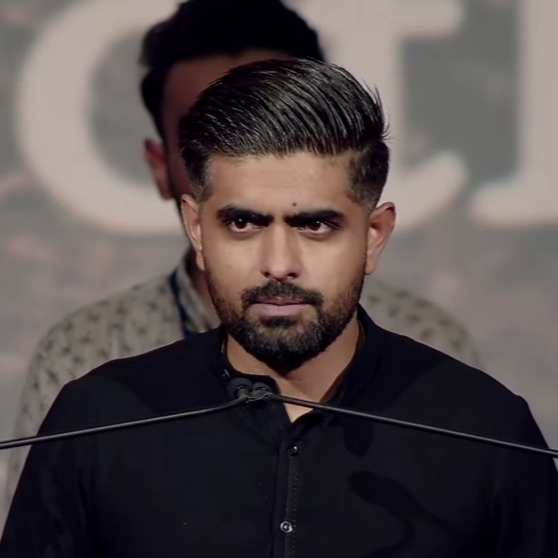
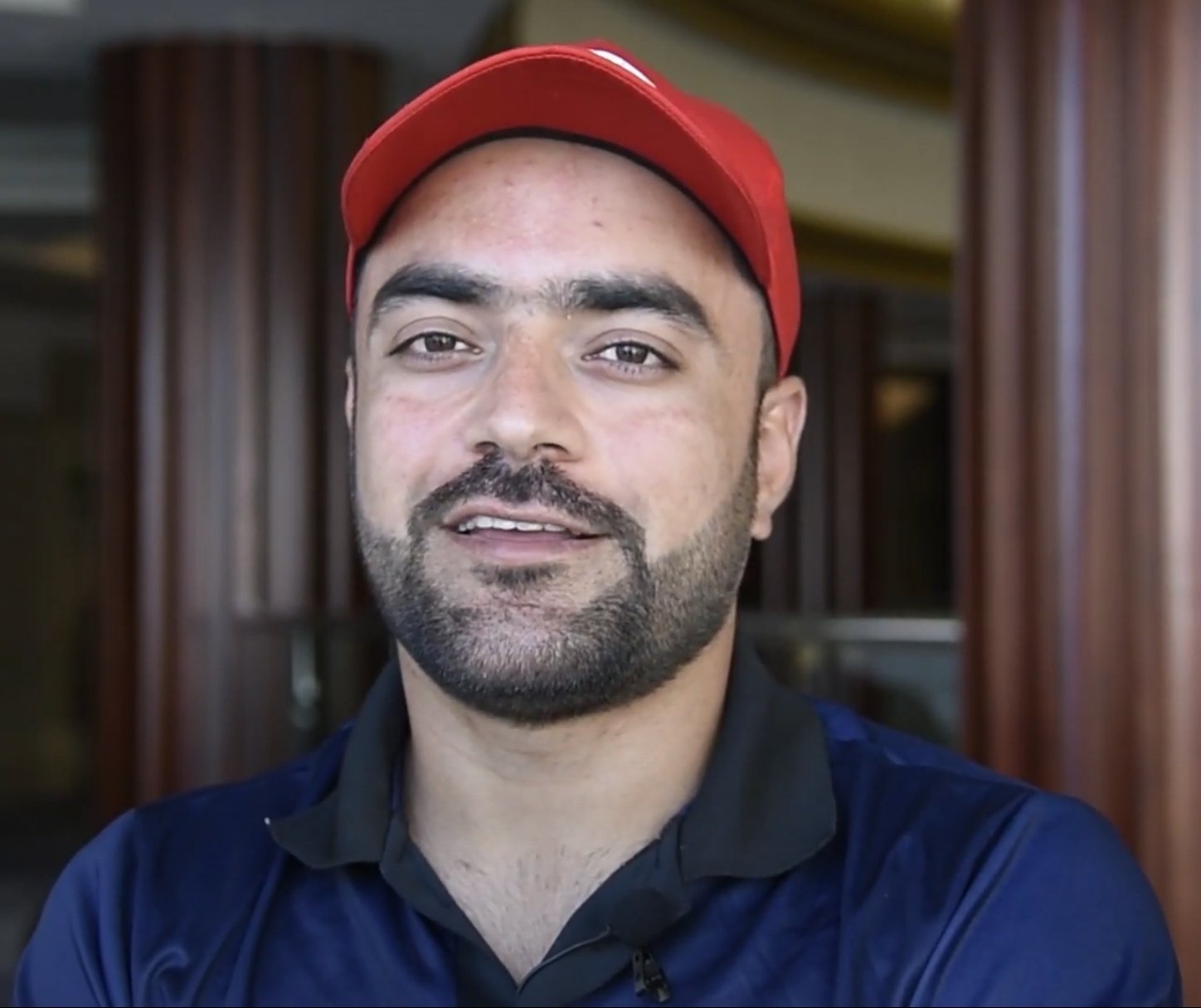
Babar Azam (left) and Rashid Khan are the highest run-scorer and wicket-taker in T20Is respectively.

A Twenty20 International (T20I) is a form of Twenty20 cricket in which each team plays a single innings with a maximum of twenty overs. The matches are played between international teams recognized by the International Cricket Council (ICC). The first T20I was played on 17 February 2005 between Australia and New Zealand, with the first ICC T20 World Cup held in 2007. As of June 2026, 100 nations feature in T20I team rankings released by ICC. The article lists the various records for men's T20Is.

== Listing notation ==
Team notation

- (100/3) indicates that a team scored 100 runs for three wickets and the innings was closed, either due to a successful run chase or if no overs remained (or are able) to be bowled.
- (100) indicates that a team scored 100 runs and was all out, either by losing all ten wickets or by having one or more batsmen unable to bat and losing the remaining wickets.

Batting notation

- (100*) indicates a batsman scored 100 runs and was not out.
- (75) indicates that a batsman scored 75 runs and was out after that.

Bowling notation

- (5/40) indicates that a bowler has captured 5 wickets while giving away 40 runs.
- (19.5 overs) indicates that a team bowled 19 complete overs (each of six legal deliveries), and one incomplete over of just five deliveries.

Currently playing

- Record holders who are currently playing T20Is (i.e. their record details listed could change) are shown by † in career / yearly records.

== Result summary ==
Team	Matches	Won	Lost	Tied	Tie+W	Tie+L	NR	Win %*
Afghanistan	171	102	65	0	0	3	1	60.00
Argentina	38	23	14	0	0	0	2	61.11
Australia	230	128	92	0	1	2	7	57.84
Austria	108	67	38	0	0	0	3	63.80
Bahamas	43	11	30	0	0	0	2	26.82
Bahrain	135	78	50	0	4	0	3	61.36
Bangladesh	222	89	128	0	0	0	5	41.01
Belgium	66	39	26	0	0	1	0	59.09
Belize	20	8	12	0	0	0	0	40.00
Bermuda	61	39	20	0	0	0	2	66.10
Bhutan	52	18	34	0	0	0	0	34.61
Botswana	77	32	44	0	0	0	1	42.10
Brazil	32	11	18	0	0	0	3	37.93
Bulgaria	71	21	47	0	0	0	3	30.88
Cambodia	45	16	27	0	0	0	2	37.20
Cameroon	28	6	21	0	0	0	1	22.22
Canada	90	48	38	0	0	2	2	54.54
Cayman Islands	52	28	23	0	0	0	1	54.90
Chile	6	1	5	0	0	0	0	16.66
China	18	2	16	0	0	0	0	11.11
Cook Islands	23	12	11	0	0	0	0	52.17
Costa Rica	30	10	20	0	0	0	0	33.33
Croatia	37	6	30	0	0	0	1	16.66
Cyprus	42	22	20	0	0	0	0	52.38
Czech Republic	58	29	28	0	1	0	0	51.72
Denmark	54	29	23	0	0	0	2	55.76
England	234	128	93	0	2	0	11	58.29
Estonia	39	13	26	0	0	0	0	33.33
Eswatini	48	16	29	0	1	0	2	36.95
Falkland Islands	14	7	7	0	0	0	0	50.00
Fiji	22	8	14	0	0	0	0	36.36
Finland	56	26	28	0	1	0	1	49.09
France	53	27	25	0	1	0	0	52.83
Gambia	17	2	15	0	0	0	0	11.76
Germany	79	49	30	0	0	0	0	62.02
Ghana	55	24	30	0	1	0	0	44.45
Gibraltar	61	17	42	1	1	0	0	30.32
Greece	19	3	15	0	0	0	1	16.66
Guernsey	57	26	26	0	0	1	4	49.05
Hong Kong	141	67	68	2	0	0	4	50.36
Hungary	58	23	33	0	0	1	1	40.35
ICC World XI	4	1	3	0	0	0	0	25.00
India	302	201	84	1	6	0	10	71.06
Indonesia	119	51	65	0	1	0	2	43.58
Iran	3	0	3	0	0	0	0	0.00
Ireland	190	80	99	1	1	0	9	45.02
Isle of Man	33	15	15	0	0	0	3	50.00
Israel	18	5	13	0	0	0	0	27.77
Italy	43	26	16	0	0	0	1	61.90
Ivory Coast	11	0	11	0	0	0	0	0.00
Japan	65	41	21	0	0	1	2	65.07
Jersey	61	42	18	0	1	0	0	70.49
Kenya	138	79	56	0	0	0	3	58.51
Kuwait	88	49	35	0	0	3	1	56.32
Lesotho	39	7	31	0	0	0	1	18.42
Luxembourg	60	21	39	0	0	0	0	35.00
Malawi	75	35	37	0	0	0	3	48.61
Malaysia	138	81	52	1	0	0	4	60.82
Maldives	55	12	41	0	0	0	2	22.64
Mali	21	1	18	0	0	0	2	5.26
Malta	94	38	53	1	0	1	1	41.93
Mexico	44	18	25	0	0	0	1	41.86
Mongolia	21	0	19	0	0	0	2	0.00
Mozambique	55	24	28	0	0	1	2	45.28
Myanmar	38	7	31	0	0	0	0	18.42
Namibia	99	57	40	0	1	0	1	59.18
Nepal	124	72	45	0	1	2	4	60.83
Netherlands	133	64	61	1	1	1	5	51.17
New Zealand	271	136	113	1	2	7	12	53.47
Nigeria	105	56	47	0	0	0	2	54.36
Norway	63	31	32	0	0	0	0	49.20
Oman	120	54	63	0	1	1	1	46.21
Pakistan	304	176	116	0	1	3	8	59.79
Panama	37	13	22	0	0	0	2	37.14
Papua New Guinea	74	41	32	0	0	0	1	56.16
Peru	7	2	5	0	0	0	0	28.57
Philippines	48	20	26	0	1	0	1	44.68
Portugal	52	40	10	0	1	0	1	80.39
Qatar	91	48	36	0	2	2	3	56.81
Romania	81	51	29	0	0	0	1	63.75
Rwanda	140	51	86	0	0	1	2	36.95
Saint Helena	16	3	11	0	0	0	2	21.42
Samoa	37	11	26	0	0	0	0	29.72
Saudi Arabia	71	40	30	0	1	0	0	57.74
Scotland	116	52	59	1	0	0	4	46.87
Serbia	53	15	37	0	0	0	1	28.84
Seychelles	22	3	16	0	0	0	3	15.78
Sierra Leone	65	20	45	0	0	0	0	30.76
Singapore	86	33	50	0	0	1	2	39.28
Slovenia	24	3	21	0	0	0	0	12.50
South Africa	235	129	101	0	1	1	3	56.46
South Korea	28	9	19	0	0	0	0	32.14
Spain	54	44	9	0	0	0	1	83.01
Sri Lanka	243	105	130	0	2	4	2	44.39
Suriname	14	3	11	0	0	0	0	21.42
Sweden	56	28	26	0	0	2	0	50.00
Switzerland	44	24	18	0	0	0	2	57.14
Tanzania	83	51	29	0	0	0	3	63.75
Thailand	75	26	47	0	0	0	2	35.61
Timor-Leste	8	0	8	0	0	0	0	0.00
Turkey	29	3	25	0	0	0	1	10.71
Turks and Caicos Islands	4	1	3	0	0	0	0	25.00
Uganda	132	101	28	0	0	0	3	78.29
United Arab Emirates	152	82	69	0	0	0	1	54.30
United States	58	31	22	0	2	1	2	58.92
Uzbekistan	4	0	4	0	0	0	0	0.00
Vanuatu	46	19	27	0	0	0	0	41.30
West Indies	260	111	133	0	2	1	13	45.74
Zambia	21	9	12	0	0	0	0	42.85
Zimbabwe	206	71	130	0	2	0	3	35.96
Tie+W and Tie+L indicates matches tied and then won or lost in a tiebreaker such as a bowlout or super over. The win percentage excludes no results and counts ties as half a win if there was no tiebreaker (otherwise the tiebreker determines a win or loss). Updated: 21 November 2026

== Team records ==
=== Largest winning margin (by runs) ===
Margin	Teams	Venue	Date	Scorecard
290	Zimbabwe (344/4) beat Gambia (54)	Ruaraka Sports Club Ground, Nairobi	23 October 2024	Scorecard
273	Nepal (314/3) beat Mongolia (41)	Zhejiang University of Technology Cricket Field, Zhejiang	27 September 2023	Scorecard
271	Rwanda (288/2) beat Ivory Coast (17)	Botswana Cricket Association Oval 1, Gaborone	24 May 2026	Scorecard
264	Nigeria (271/4) beat Ivory Coast (7)	Nigeria Cricket Federation Oval 1, Abuja	24 November 2024	Scorecard
257	Czech Republic (278/4) beat Turkey (21)	Moara Vlasiei Cricket Ground, Ilfov County	30 August 2019	Scorecard
Updated: 24 May 2026

=== Largest winning margin (by balls remaining) ===
Balls Rem	Teams	Venue	Date	Scorecard
118	Spain (13/0) beat Isle of Man (10)	La Manga Club Ground, Cartagena	26 February 2023	Scorecard
115	Singapore (13/1) beat Mongolia (10)	UKM-YSD Cricket Oval, Bangi	5 September 2024	Scorecard
115	Tanzania (19/0) beat Mali (18)	University of Dar es Salaam Ground, Dar es Salaam	21 September 2024	Scorecard
115	Uganda (23/0) beat Mozambique (19)	Nigeria Cricket Federation Oval 2, Abuja	24 October 2026	Scorecard
113	Bahrain (18/2) beat Mongolia (17)	Selangor Turf Club, Seri Kembangan	11 October 2026	Scorecard
Updated: 24 October 2026

=== Largest winning margin (by wickets) ===
As of October 2026, 110 matches have been won by a margin of 10 wickets.

=== Smallest winning margin (by runs) ===
As of October 2026, 38 matches have been won by a margin of a single run.

=== Smallest winning margin (by wickets) ===
As of August 2026, 25 matches have been won by a margin of a single wicket.

=== Smallest winning margin (by balls remaining) ===
As of October 2026, teams batting second have won on the last ball of the match on 69 occasions.

=== Tied matches ===
As of July 2026, there have been 48 tied matches. Most of these matches were followed by a tiebreaker (either bowlout or super over). Four matches have been tied and not then decided by a tiebreaker.

Team 1	Score	Team 2	Score	Date	Venue	Scorecard
Scotland	185/4 (20 overs)	Ireland	185/6 (20 overs)	17 June 2018	Sportpark Het Schootsveld, Deventer	Scorecard
Malaysia	107/4 (13 overs)	Netherlands	91/4 (10 overs) (Note: Match was interrupted due to rain. Scores were level as per DLS method.)	21 April 2021	Tribhuvan University Ground, Kirtipur	Scorecard
Malta	145 (19 overs)	Gibraltar	57/2 (9.2 overs)	25 October 2021	Marsa Sports Club, Malta	Scorecard
New Zealand	160 (19.4 overs)	India	75/4 (9 overs)	22 November 2022	McLean Park, Napier, New Zealand	Scorecard

=== Most consecutive wins ===
Wins	Team	First win	Last win
24	Spain	Isle of Man at Cartagena, 25 February 2023	Bulgaria at Vantaa, 18 August 2026
17	Uganda	Bahrain at Jinja, 29 October 2024	United Arab Emirates at Entebbe, 27 July 2025
14	Japan	Mongolia at Sano, 9 May 2024	Cook Islands at Sano, 9 May 2025
13	Malaysia	Singapore at Singapore, 29 June 2022	Bahrain at Bangi, 19 December 2022
13	Bermuda	Panama at Coolidge, 11 November 2021	Panama at Hamilton, 4 October 2023
No results are excluded. A no result occurs when a match is abandoned after the toss and before a result can be determined, usually due to rain. * indicates an ongoing streak Updated: 21 August 2026

=== Most consecutive matches without a win ===
Winless matches	Team	First Winless match	Last Winless match
21*	Mongolia	Nepal at Hangzhou, 27 September 2023 (Scorecard)	Qatar at Bangi, 14 October 2026 (Scorecard)
20	Croatia	Switzerland at Krefeld, 13 July 2025 (Scorecard)	France at Episkopi, 17 May 2026 (Scorecard)
17	Mali	Lesotho at Kigali, 17 November 2022 (Scorecard)	Botswana at Goborone, 24 May 2026 (T20I 3905)
16	Zimbabwe	Sri Lanka at Providence, 3 May 2010 (Scorecard)	West Indies at North Sound, 3 March 2013 (Scorecard)
16	Singapore	Papua New Guinea at Singapore, 3 July 2022 (Scorecard)	Qatar at Bangi, 23 December 2022 (Scorecard)
No results are considered as winless matches. A no result occurs when a match is abandoned partway through, usually due to rain. * indicates that the sequence is ongoing. Updated: 14 October 2026

== Team scoring records ==
=== Highest innings totals ===
Score	Batting team	Opposition	Venue	Date	Scorecard
344/4 (20.0 overs)	Zimbabwe	Gambia	Ruaraka Sports Club Ground, Nairobi	23 October 2024	Scorecard
322/7 (20.0 overs)	Austria	Hungary	GB Oval, Sződliget	28 June 2026	Scorecard
314/3 (20.0 overs)	Nepal	Mongolia	Zhejiang University of Technology Cricket Field, Zhejiang	27 September 2023	Scorecard
313/2 (20.0 overs)	Nepal	China	Singapore National Cricket Ground, West Coast	31 May 2026	Scorecard
308/1 (20.0 overs)	Germany	Austria	Bayer Uerdingen Cricket Ground, Krefeld	1 May 2026	Scorecard
Updated: 28 June 2026

=== Highest successful chases ===
Target	Score	Batting team	Opposition	Venue	Date	Scorecard
259	259/4 (18.5 overs)	South Africa	West Indies	Centurion Park, Centurion	26 March 2023	Scorecard
250	252/4 (18.3 overs)	West Indies	India	JSCA International Stadium Complex, Ranchi	9 October 2026	Scorecard
244	245/5 (18.5 overs)	Australia	New Zealand	Eden Park, Auckland	16 February 2018	Scorecard
244	244/4 (14.2 overs)	Bulgaria	Gibraltar	National Sports Academy, Sofia	11 July 2025	Scorecard
243	246/4 (19.4 overs)	Bulgaria	Serbia	National Sports Academy, Sofia	26 June 2022	Scorecard
Updated: 9 October 2026

=== Lowest score successfully defended ===
Score	Team	Opposition	Opposition Score	Venue	Date	Scorecard
90 (17.4 overs)	Nigeria	Sierra Leone	71 (17.4 overs)	University of Lagos Cricket Oval, Lagos	24 October 2021	Scorecard
93/9 (20 overs)	Mexico	Costa Rica	35 (11.1 overs)	Los Reyes Polo Club, Guácima	14 April 2024	Scorecard
94 (19.3 overs)	Jersey	Denmark	89 (19.5 overs)	Desert Springs Cricket Ground, Almería	17 October 2021	Scorecard
94 (19.4 overs)	Scotland	United Arab Emirates	62 (15.2 overs)	Dubai International Cricket Stadium, Dubai	14 March 2024	Scorecard
94 (16.1 overs)	Costa Rica	Falkland Islands	28 (12.1 overs)	Los Reyes Polo Club, Costa Rica	10 March 2025	T20I 3109
Last updated: 23 May 2026 Qualification: Only includes full 20-over matches

=== Highest innings total batting second ===
Score	Batting team	Opposition	Venue	Date	Scorecard
259/4 (18.5 overs)	South Africa	West Indies	Centurion Park, Centurion	26 March 2023	Scorecard
252/4 (18.3 overs)	West Indies	India	JSCA International Stadium Complex, Ranchi	9 October 2026	Scorecard
246/4 (19.4 overs)	Bulgaria	Serbia	National Sports Academy, Sofia	26 June 2022	Scorecard
246/7 (20.0 overs)	England	India	Wankhede Stadium, Mumbai	5 March 2026	Scorecard
245/5 (18.5 overs)	Australia	New Zealand	Eden Park, Auckland	16 February 2018	Scorecard
Last updated: 9 October 2026

=== Highest match aggregate ===
Score	Teams	Venue	Date	Scorecard
517/9	West Indies (258/5) v South Africa (259/4)	Centurion Park, Centurion	26 March 2023	Scorecard
501/9	West Indies (252/4) v India (249/5)	JSCA International Stadium Complex, Ranchi	9 October 2026	Scorecard
499/14	India (253/7) v England (246/7)	Wankhede Stadium, Mumbai	5 March 2026	Scorecard
496/15	India (271/5) v New Zealand (225)	Greenfield International Stadium, Thiruvananthapuram	31 January 2026	Scorecard
489/10	West Indies (245/6) v India (244/4)	Central Broward Regional Park, Florida	27 August 2016	Scorecard
Last updated: 9 October 2026

=== Lowest innings totals ===
Score	Batting team	Opposition	Venue	Date	Scorecard
7 (7.3 overs)	Ivory Coast	Nigeria	Nigeria Cricket Federation Oval 1, Abuja	24 November 2024	Scorecard
10 (10 overs)	Mongolia	Singapore	UKM-YSD Cricket Oval, Bangi	5 September 2024	Scorecard
10 (8.4 overs)	Isle of Man	Spain	La Manga Club Ground, Cartagena	26 February 2023	Scorecard
12 (8.2 overs)	Mongolia	Japan	Sano International Cricket Ground, Sano	8 May 2024	Scorecard
13 (11.3 overs)	Mongolia	Thailand	Bayuemas Oval, Pandamaran	9 October 2026	Scorecard
Updated: 9 October 2026; Qualification: Only completed innings where a team was bowled out or in matches that did not have overs reduced are included.

=== Shortest completed innings (by balls) ===
Balls	Score	Team	Opponent	Venue	Date	Scorecard
37	24	Rwanda	Nigeria	Tafawa Balewa Square Cricket Oval, Lagos	14 October 2023	Scorecard
45	7	Ivory Coast	Nigeria	Nigeria Cricket Federation Oval 1, Abuja	24 November 2024	Scorecard
50	12	Mongolia	Japan	Sano International Cricket Ground, Sano	8 May 2024	Scorecard
51	21	Turkey	Czech Republic	Moara Vlasiei Cricket Ground, Ilfov County	30 August 2019	Scorecard
51	35	Cameroon	Sierra Leone	Willowmoore Park, Benoni	10 December 2023	Scorecard
51	24	Ivory Coast	Botswana	Botswana Cricket Association Oval 1, Gaborone	28 May 2026	Scorecard
Last updated: 28 May 2026

=== Lowest match aggregate ===
Score	Aggregate	Teams	Venue	Date	Scorecard
23	23/11	Mongolia (10) v Singapore (13/1)	UKM-YSD Cricket Oval, Bangi	5 September 2024	Scorecard
23	23/10	Isle of Man (10) v Spain (13/0)	La Manga Club Ground, Cartagena	26 February 2023	Scorecard
34	34/9	Timor-Leste (18/9) v Indonesia (16/0)	Udayana Cricket Ground, Jimbaran	11 November 2025	Scorecard
35	35/11	Mongolia (17) v Hong Kong (18/1)	Bayuemas Oval, Pandamaran	31 August 2024	Scorecard
35	35/12	Mongolia (17) v Bahrain (18/2)	Selangor Turf Club, Kuala Lumpur	11 October 2026	Scorecard
Last updated: 11 October 2026

=== Most sixes in an innings ===
Sixes	Batting Team	Opposition	Venue	Date	Scorecard
29	Spain	Croatia	La Manga Club Ground, Cartagena	7 December 2025	Scorecard
29	Nepal	China	Singapore National Cricket Ground, West Coast	31 May 2026	Scorecard
27	Zimbabwe	Gambia	Ruaraka Sports Club Ground, Nairobi, Kenya	23 October 2024	Scorecard
26	Nepal	Mongolia	Zhejiang University of Technology Cricket Field, Zhejiang, China	27 September 2023	Scorecard
25	Austria	Hungary	GB Oval, Sződliget	28 June 2026	Scorecard
Updated: 28 June 2026

=== Most fours in an innings ===
Fours	Batting team	Opposition	Venue	Date	Scorecard
32	Czech Republic	Serbia	Vinoř Cricket Ground (Scott Page Field), Prague	27 June 2026	Scorecard
30	Sri Lanka	Kenya	The Wanderers Stadium, Johannesburg	14 September 2007	Scorecard
30	Zimbabwe	Gambia	Ruaraka Sports Club Ground, Nairobi	23 October 2024	Scorecard
30	England	South Africa	Old Trafford, Manchester	12 September 2025	Scorecard
30	Zimbabwe	Botswana	Harare Sports Club, Harare	28 September 2025	Scorecard
Updated: 27 June 2026

=== Most sixes in a match ===
Sixes	Teams	Venue	Date	Scorecard
41	Bulgaria (23) v Gibraltar (18)	National Sports Academy, Sofia	11 July 2025	Scorecard
36	India (23) v New Zealand (13)	Greenfield International Stadium, Thiruvananthapuram	31 January 2026	Scorecard
35	West Indies (22) v South Africa (13)	Centurion Park, Centurion	26 March 2023	Scorecard
35	Jersey (24) v Croatia (11)	Episkopi, Cyprus	20 May 2026	T20I 3892
34	West Indies (16) v England (18)	National Cricket Stadium, St. George's	16 December 2023	Scorecard
34	India (19) v England (15)	Wankhede Stadium, Mumbai	5 March 2026	Scorecard
Updated: 23 May 2026

=== Most fours in a match ===
Fours	Teams	Venue	Date	Scorecard
49	India (23) v Australia (26)	Assam Cricket Association Stadium, Guwahati	28 November 2023	Scorecard
49	Japan (25) v Singapore (24)	Terdthai Cricket Ground, Bangkok	11 February 2024	Scorecard
48	Czech Republic (32) v Serbia (16)	Vinoř Cricket Ground (Scott Page Field), Prague	27 June 2026	Scorecard
47	India (18) v Sri Lanka (29)	Vidarbha Cricket Association Stadium, Nagpur	9 December 2009	Scorecard
46	6 instances			
Updated: 27 June 2026

== Batting records ==
=== Most career runs ===
Runs	Innings	Batter	Team	Span
4,596	136	Babar Azam	Pakistan	2016–present
4,384	150	Jos Buttler†	England	2011–present
4,231	151	Rohit Sharma	India	2007–2024
4,188	117	Virat Kohli	India	2010–2024
3,895	160	Paul Stirling†	Ireland	2009–present
As of 19 September 2026

=== Most career runs in each batting position ===
Batting Position	Batter	Innings	Runs	Team	Span	Ref
Opener	Paul Stirling†	156	3,818	Ireland	2010–2026	
Number 3	Virat Kohli	80	3,076	India	2011–2024	
Number 4	Suryakumar Yadav†	63	2,122	India	2021–2026	
Number 5	David Miller†	54	1,296	South Africa	2010–2026	
Number 6	Dasun Shanaka†	64	1,085	Sri Lanka	2016–2026	
Number 7	Mitchell Santner†	61	686	New Zealand	2015–2026	
Number 8	Rashid Khan†	46	479	Afghanistan	2016–2026	
Number 9	Shaheen Afridi†	24	219	Pakistan	2020–2026	
Number 10	Barry McCarthy†	15	137	Ireland	2017–2026	
Number 11	Mustafizur Rahman†	25	98	Bangladesh	2015–2026	
Updated: 2 November 2026

=== Fastest to multiples of 1,000 career runs ===
Runs	Batter	Team	Innings	Record Date	Ref
1,000	Dawid Malan	England	24	20 March 2021	
1,000	Sabawoon Davizi	Czech Republic	24	24 July 2022	
2,000	Karanbir Singh	Austria	45	2 May 2026	
3,000	Mohammad Rizwan	Pakistan	79	20 April 2024	
4,000	Virat Kohli	India	107	10 November 2022	
Updated: 2 May 2026

=== Highest individual score ===
Runs	Batter	Batting team	Opposition	Venue	Date	Scorecard
172	Aaron Finch	Australia	Zimbabwe	Harare Sports Club, Harare	3 July 2018	Scorecard
164*	Hamza Khan	Rwanda	Ivory Coast	Botswana Cricket Association Oval 1, Gaborone	24 May 2026	Scorecard
164	Karanbir Singh	Austria	Hungary	GB Oval, Sződliget	28 June 2026	Scorecard
162*	Hazratullah Zazai	Afghanistan	Ireland	Rajiv Gandhi International Cricket Stadium, Dehradun	23 February 2019	Scorecard
160	Mohammad Ihsan	Spain	Croatia	La Manga Club Ground, Cartagena	7 December 2025	Scorecard
Updated: 28 June 2026

=== Highest individual score in each batting position ===
Score	Position	Batter	Batting team	Opposition	Venue	Date	Scorecard
172	Opener	Aaron Finch	Australia	Zimbabwe	Harare Sports Club, Harare	3 July 2018	Scorecard
137*	Number 3	Kushal Malla	Nepal	Mongolia	Zhejiang University of Technology Cricket Field, Zhejiang	27 September 2023	Scorecard
144*	Number 4	Sahil Chauhan	Estonia	Cyprus	Happy Valley Ground, Episkopi	17 June 2024	Scorecard
112*	Number 5	Manpreet Singh	Singapore	Indonesia	Singapore National Cricket Ground, Singapore	25 June 2026	Scorecard
125*	Number 6	Shaheryar Butt	Belgium	Czech Republic	Pierre Werner Cricket Ground, Walferdange	29 August 2020	Scorecard
93*	Number 7	Abidullah Kotwa	Austria	Hungary	GB Oval, Sződliget	28 June 2026	Scorecard
100*	Number 8	Saber Zakhil	Belgium	Austria	Royal Brussels Cricket Club, Waterloo	24 July 2021	Scorecard
58*	Number 9	Hamid Safi	Austria	Slovenia	Velden Cricket Ground, Latschach	17 May 2025	Scorecard
52*	Number 10	Lansana Lamin	Sierra Leone	Eswatini	Nigeria Cricket Federation Oval 2, Abuja	28 November 2024	Scorecard
31*	Number 11	Khalid Ahmadi	Belgium	Malta	Marsa Sports Club, Marsa	10 July 2021	Scorecard
Updated: 28 June 2026

=== Highest individual score (progression of record) ===
Runs	Batter	Batting team	Opposition	Venue	Date	Scorecard
98*	Ricky Ponting	Australia	New Zealand	Eden Park, Auckland	17 February 2005	Scorecard
117	Chris Gayle	West Indies	South Africa	Wanderers Stadium, Johannesburg	11 September 2007	Scorecard
123	Brendon McCullum	New Zealand	Bangladesh	Pallekele International Cricket Stadium, Pallekele	21 September 2012	Scorecard
156	Aaron Finch	Australia	England	Rose Bowl, Southampton	29 August 2013	Scorecard
172	Aaron Finch	Australia	Zimbabwe	Harare Sports Club, Harare	3 July 2018	Scorecard
Updated: 15 November 2024

=== Highest career average ===
Average	Batter	Team	Innings	Not out	Runs	Span
48.69	Virat Kohli	India	117	31	4,188	2010–2024
47.41	Mohammad Rizwan	Pakistan	93	21	3,414	2015–2024
45.89	Karanbir Singh†	Austria	64	7	2,616	2024–2026
43.11	Tilak Varma†	India	71	26	1,940	2022–2026
42.98	Sami Sohail†	Malawi	71	20	2,192	2021–2026
Qualification: 50 innings. Updated: 30 October 2026

=== Highest career average in each batting position ===
Batting Position	Batter	Team	Innings	Runs	Average	Span	Ref
Opener	Mohammad Rizwan	Pakistan	76	3,162	51.83	2020–2024	
Number 3	Virat Kohli	India	80	3,076	53.96	2011–2024	
Number 4	Matthew Stokes†	Guernsey	44	1,288	44.41	2019–2026	
Number 5	JP Duminy	South Africa	21	531	44.25	2008–2017	
Number 6	JJ Smit†	Namibia	24	571	47.58	2019–2026	
Number 7	Matthew Wade†	Afghanistan	35	496	27.55	2010–2026	
Number 8	Sompal Kami†	Nepal	20	171	21.37	2015–2026	
Number 9	Shaheen Afridi†	Pakistan	24	219	16.84	2020–2026	
Number 10	Adil Rashid†	England	23	87	10.87	2009–2026	
Number 11	Mustafizur Rahman†	Bangladesh	25	98	8.16	2015–2026	
Qualification: Minimum 20 innings batted at position. Updated: 2 November 2026

=== Highest career strike rate ===
Strike rate	Batter	Team	Runs scored	Balls faced	Span
196.36	Abhishek Sharma †	India	2,268	1,155	2024–2026
183.39	Mehboob Ali †	Malta	519	283	2025–2026
176.78	Olipa Gerald †	Uganda	495	280	2026–2026
175.91	Sahil Chauhan †	Estonia	526	299	2023–2026
174.32	Mohammad Ihsan †	Spain	903	518	2022–2026
Qualification: 250 balls. Updated: 1 November 2026

=== Most hundreds in career ===
100s	Batter	Team	Innings	Span
5	Glenn Maxwell	Australia	118	2012–2026
5	Rohit Sharma	India	151	2007–2024
4	Phil Salt†	England	60	2022–2026
4	Karanbir Singh†	Austria	64	2024–2026
4	Abhishek Sharma†	India	71	2024–2026
4	Suryakumar Yadav†	India	107	2021–2026
Updated: 27 October 2026

=== Most 50+ scores ===
50+ scores	Batter	Team	100s	50s	Innings	Span
42	Babar Azam†	Pakistan	3	39	136	2016–2026
39	Virat Kohli	India	1	38	117	2010–2024
37	Rohit Sharma	India	5	32	151	2007–2024
32	Jos Buttler†	England	2	30	150	2011–2026
31	Mohammad Rizwan†	Pakistan	1	30	93	2015–2024
Updated: 19 September 2026

=== Fastest 100 ===
Balls	Batter	Opposition	Venue	Date	Scorecard
27	(Estonia) Sahil Chauhan	Cyprus	Happy Valley Ground, Episkopi	17 June 2024	Scorecard
29	(Turkey) Muhammad Fahad	Bulgaria	Vasil Levski National Sports Academy, Sofia	12 July 2025	Scorecard
30	(India) Abhishek Sharma	Afghanistan	Arun Jaitley Cricket Stadium, New Delhi	17 September 2026	Scorecard
33	(Namibia) Jan Nicol Loftie-Eaton	Nepal	Tribhuvan University International Cricket Ground, Kirtipur	27 February 2024	Scorecard
33	(Zimbabwe) Sikandar Raza	Gambia	Ruaraka Sports Club Ground, Nairobi	23 October 2024	Scorecard
33	(New Zealand) Finn Allen	South Africa	Eden Gardens, Kolkata	4 March 2026	Scorecard
Updated: 17 September 2026

=== Fastest 50 ===
Balls	Batter	Opposition	Venue	Date	Scorecard
9	(Nepal) Dipendra Singh Airee	Mongolia	Zhejiang University of Technology Cricket Field, Zhejiang	27 September 2023	Scorecard
12	(India) Yuvraj Singh	England	Kingsmead Cricket Ground, Durban	19 September 2007	Scorecard
12	(Austria) Abidullah Kotwa	Hungary	GB Oval, Sződliget	28 June 2026	Scorecard
13	(Austria) Mirza Ahsan	Luxembourg	Moara Vlasiei Cricket Ground, Ilfov County	31 August 2019	Scorecard
13	(Zimbabwe) Tadiwanashe Marumani	Gambia	Ruaraka Sports Club Ground, Nairobi	23 October 2024	Scorecard
13	(Turkey) Muhammad Fahad	Bulgaria	Vasil Levski National Sports Academy, Sofia	12 July 2025	Scorecard
13	(Namibia) Jan Frylinck	Zimbabwe	Queens Sports Club, Bulawayo	18 September 2025	Scorecard
13	(Singapore) Shujaat Rasool	Bahrain	Singapore National Cricket Ground, Singapore	5 June 2026	Scorecard
Updated: 28 June 2026

=== Most career sixes ===
Sixes	Balls faced	Batter	Team	Span
214	1,501	Karanbir Singh†	Austria	2022–2026
205	3,003	Rohit Sharma	India	2007–2024
196	2,233	Muhammad Waseem†	United Arab Emirates	2021–2026
192	2,920	Jos Buttler†	England	2011–2026
179	2,008	Suryakumar Yadav†	India	2021–2026
Updated: 19 September 2026

=== Most career fours ===
Fours	Balls faced	Batter	Team	Span
477	3,590	Babar Azam†	Pakistan	2016–2026
449	2,899	Paul Stirling†	Ireland	2009–2026
389	2,828	Jos Buttler†	England	2016–2026
383	3,003	Rohit Sharma	India	2007–2024
369	3,056	Virat Kohli	India	2010–2024
Updated: 20 July 2026

=== Highest strike rate in an innings ===
Strike rate	Score	Batter	Team	Opposition	Venue	Date	Scorecard
520.00	52* (10)	Dipendra Singh Airee	Nepal	Mongolia	Zhejiang University of Technology Cricket Field, Zhejiang	27 September 2023	Scorecard
500.00	30* (6)	Ahmad Khalid Ahmadzai	Belgium	Romania	Moara Vlasei Cricket Ground, Ilfov County	19 June 2026	Scorecard
485.71	34* (7)	Manan Bashir	Bulgaria	Turkey	National Sports Academy, Sofia	10 July 2025	Scorecard
477.77	43* (9)	Manan Bashir	Bulgaria	Gibraltar	National Sports Academy, Sofia	13 July 2025	Scorecard
442.85	31* (7)	Harry Brook	England	West Indies	National Cricket Stadium, St. George's	16 December 2023	Scorecard
Qualification: Minimum of 25 runs, number in parentheses represents the number of balls the batsman faced during the innings. Updated: 19 June 2026

=== Most sixes in an innings ===
Sixes	Balls Faced	Batter	Batting team	Opposition	Venue	Date	Scorecard
18	41	Sahil Chauhan	Estonia	Cyprus	Happy Valley Ground, Episkopi	17 June 2024	Scorecard
17	63	Mohammad Ihsan	Spain	Croatia	La Manga Club Top Ground, Cartagena	7 December 2025	Scorecard
16	43	Kushal Bhurtel	Nepal	China	Singapore National Cricket Ground, Singapore	31 May 2026	Scorecard
16	62	Hazratullah Zazai	Afghanistan	Ireland	Rajiv Gandhi International Cricket Stadium, Dehradun	23 February 2019	Scorecard
16	62	Finn Allen	New Zealand	Pakistan	University of Otago Oval, Dunedin	17 January 2024	Scorecard
Updated: 31 May 2026

=== Most fours in an innings ===
Fours	Balls Faced	Batter	Team	Opposition	Venue	Date	Scorecard
18	57	Karanbir Singh	Austria	Hungary	GB Oval, Sződliget	28 June 2026	Scorecard
17	55	Dylan Steyn	Czech Republic	Bulgaria	Marsa Sports Club, Marsa	12 May 2022	Scorecard
17	58	Ben Kohler-Cadmore	Germany	Austria	Bayer Uerdingen Cricket Ground, Krefeld	1 May 2026	Scorecard
17	64	Darius Visser	Samoa	Malaysia	Singapore National Cricket Ground, Singapore	24 July 2025	Scorecard
16	54	Brendan Taylor	Zimbabwe	Botswana	Harare Sports Club, Harare	28 September 2025	Scorecard
16	62	Waji Ul Hassan	Saudi Arabia	Bhutan	Terdthai Cricket Ground, Bangkok	15 February 2024	Scorecard
16	62	Ratul Khan	Czech Republic	Serbia	Vinoř Cricket Ground (Scott Page Field), Prague	27 June 2026	Scorecard
16	76	Aaron Finch	Australia	Zimbabwe	Harare Sports Club, Harare	3 July 2018	Scorecard
Updated: 28 June 2026

=== Most runs in an over ===
Runs	Sequence	Batter	Batting Team	Bowler	Bowling Team	Venue	Date	Scorecard
39	6–6–6–nb–6–0–nb–(nb+6)–6	Darius Visser	Samoa	Nalin Nipiko	Vanuatu	Faleata Oval, Apia	20 August 2024	Scorecard
37	6–6–6–6–6–1w–6	Kushal Bhurtel	Nepal	Chen Zhuoyue	China	Singapore National Cricket Ground, West Coast	31 May 2026	Scorecard
36	6–6–6–6–6–6	Yuvraj Singh	India	Stuart Broad	England	Kingsmead Cricket Ground, Durban	19 September 2007	Scorecard
36	6–6–6–6–6–6	Kieron Pollard	West Indies	Akila Dananjaya	Sri Lanka	Coolidge Cricket Ground, Osbourn	3 March 2021	Scorecard
36	6–6–6–6–6–6	Dipendra Singh Airee	Nepal	Kamran Khan	Qatar	Oman Cricket Academy Ground Turf 1, Al Amarat	13 April 2024	Scorecard
36	6–6–6–6–6–6	Manan Bashir	Bulgaria	Kabir Mirpuri	Gibraltar	National Sports Academy, Sofia	13 July 2025	Scorecard
36	4–(nb+6)–6–1–6–6–6	Rohit Sharma; Rinku Singh	India	Karim Janat	Afghanistan	M. Chinnaswamy Stadium, Bengaluru	17 January 2024	Scorecard
36	6–(nb+4)–5w–0–4lb–4–6–6	Nicholas Pooran	West Indies	Azmatullah Omarzai	Afghanistan	Daren Sammy Cricket Ground, Gros Islet	17 June 2024	Scorecard
Key: nb – No-ball; (nb+X) – A no-ball was bowled and X runs were scored off the bat; Ynb – A no-ball was bowled with one run scored directly from the no-ball and Y-1 runs being scored from byes or leg byes (however, all Y runs will be scored as no-balls on the scorecard); w – Wide; Yw – A wide was bowled with one run scored directly from the wide and Y-1 runs being scored from byes or leg byes (however, all Y runs will be scored as wide balls on the scorecard); wk – Wicket; lb – leg bye; Updated: 31 May 2026

=== Most runs in a calendar year ===
Runs	Innings	Batter	Team	Year
1,488	32	Karanbir Singh	Austria	2025
1,326	26	Mohammad Rizwan	Pakistan	2021
1,251	37	Fiaz Ahmed	Bahrain	2025
1,220	37	Ishan Kishan	India	2026
1,164	31	Suryakumar Yadav	India	2022
Updated: 2 November 2026

=== Most runs in a series ===
Runs	Batter	Team	Innings	Series
466	Adil Butt	Eswatini	7	2026 Eswatini Tri-Nation Series
402	Aaron Johnson	Canada	7	2022 Desert Cup T20I Series
395	Connor Carroll	Croatia	5	2026 Men's T20 World Cup Europe Sub-regional Qualifier A
383	Sahibzada Farhan	Pakistan	6	2026 Men's T20 World Cup
383	Sami Sohail	Malawi	9	2025 Rwanda Tri-Nation Series
Updated: 7 June 2026

=== Most career ducks ===
Ducks	Innings	Batter	Team	Span
16	83	Danilson Hawoe †	Indonesia	2022–2026
16	126	Dasun Shanaka †	Sri Lanka	2015–2026
15	65	Zappy Bimenyimana †	Rwanda	2021–2026
15	65	Chaloemwong Chatphaisan †	Thailand	2022–2026
15	89	Martin Akayezu †	Rwanda	2021–2026
Updated: 14 October 2026

== Bowling records ==
=== Most wickets ===
Wickets	Innings	Bowler	Team	Span
200	120	Rashid Khan†	Afghanistan	2015–2026
171	146	Adil Rashid†	England	2009–2026
165	116	Ehsan Khan†	Hong Kong	2016–2026
165	135	Ish Sodhi†	New Zealand	2014–2026
164	123	Tim Southee	New Zealand	2008–2024
Updated: 29 October 2026

=== Fastest to multiples of wickets ===
Wickets	Bowler	Team	Matches	Record Date	Reference
50	Dhruv Maisuria	Botswana	22	29 May 2023	
100	Rashid Khan	Afghanistan	53	29 October 2021	
150	Rashid Khan	Afghanistan	92	24 June 2024	
150	Wanindu Hasaranga (Note: Hasaranga holds the fastest record in terms of balls taken – 2035 balls, (Rashid Khan – 2098 balls))	Sri Lanka	92	11 January 2026	
200	Rashid Khan	Afghanistan	120	29 October 2026	

=== Best bowling figures ===
Figures	Overs	Bowler	Team	Opposition	Venue	Date	Scorecard
8/7	4.0	Sonam Yeshey	Bhutan	Myanmar	Gelephu International Cricket Ground, Gelephu	26 December 2025	Scorecard
7/7	4.0	Sachin Gill	Kenya	Cameroon	Botswana Cricket Association Oval 1, Gaborone	28 May 2026	Scorecard
7/8	4.0	Syazrul Idrus	Malaysia	China	Bayuemas Oval, Pandamaran	26 July 2023	Scorecard
7/19	4.0	Ali Dawood	Bahrain	Bhutan	Gelephu International Cricket Ground, Gelephu	11 December 2025	Scorecard
6/2	2.4	Nabil Master	Botswana	Mali	Botswana Cricket Association Oval 1, Gaborone	24 May 2026	Scorecard
Updated: 28 May 2026

=== Lowest bowling average ===
Average	Wickets	Runs conceded	Bowler	Team	Span
10.50	108	1,134	Alpesh Ramjani†	Uganda	2022–2026
11.51	87	1,002	Dhruv Maisuria†	Botswana	2019–2026
12.73	71	904	Yalinde Nkanya	Tanzania	2022–2026
12.88	142	1,830	Sandeep Lamichhane†	Nepal	2018–2026
13.17	79	1,041	Juma Miyagi†	Uganda	2022–2026
Qualification: 1,000 balls bowled. Updated: 25 October 2026

=== Best career economy rate ===
Economy	Overs	Runs	Bowler	Team	Span
4.71	245.5	1,158	Frank Nsubuga†	Uganda	2019–2025
4.82	235.1	1,134	Alpesh Ramjani†	Uganda	2022–2026
4.89	317.1	1,552	Muhammad Nadir†	Rwanda	2023–2026
5.10	177.0	904	Yalinde Nkanya	Tanzania	2022–2026
5.19	173.3	901	Obed Harvey†	Ghana	2021–2026
Qualification: 1,000 balls bowled. Updated: 25 October 2026

=== Best career strike rate ===
Strike rate	Wickets	Overs	Bowler	Team	Span
11.68	87	169.3	Dhruv Maisuria†	Botswana	2019–2026
11.98	98	195.5	Kuldeep Yadav†	India	2017–2026
12.61	142	298.4	Sandeep Lamichhane†	Nepal	2018–2026
12.89	79	169.5	Juma Miyagi†	Uganda	2022–2026
13.06	108	235.1	Alpesh Ramjani	Uganda	2022–2026
Qualification: 1,000 balls bowled. Updated: 25 October 2026

=== Most four-wicket hauls ===
Four-wicket hauls	Innings	Bowler	Team	Span
11	118	Rashid Khan†	Afghanistan	2015–2026
9	85	Ali Dawood†	Bahrain	2023–2026
9	116	Ehsan Khan†	Hong Kong	2016–2026
8	91	Henry Ssenyondo†	Uganda	2019–2025
8	96	Rizwan Butt†	Bahrain	2022–2026
8	126	Shakib Al Hasan	Bangladesh	2006–2024
Updated: 14 October 2026

=== Best economy rate in an innings ===
Economy	Bowling figures	Bowler	Team	Opposition	Venue	Date	Scorecard
0.00	4–4–0–2	Saad Bin Zafar	Canada	Panama	Coolidge Cricket Ground, Osbourn	14 November 2021	Scorecard
0.00	4–4–0–3	Lockie Ferguson	New Zealand	Papua New Guinea	Brian Lara Cricket Academy, San Fernando	17 June 2024	Scorecard
0.00	4–4–0–1	Ayush Shukla	Hong Kong	Mongolia	Bayuemas Oval, Pandamaran	31 August 2024	Scorecard
0.00	4–4–0–2	Ajith Augastin	Tanzania	Seychelles	Achimota Oval B, Accra	27 March 2026	Scorecard
0.50	7 bowlers						
Qualification: Four overs bowled. Updated: 27 March 2026

=== Best strike rate in an innings ===
Strike rate	Bowling figures	Bowler	Team	Opposition	Venue	Date	Scorecard
1.20	1–0–1–5	Gede Priandana	Indonesia	Cambodia	Udayana Cricket Ground, Jimbaran	23 December 2025	Scorecard
2.00	1.4–0–5–5	Junaid Aziz	Bahrain	Germany	Oman Cricket Academy Ground Turf 2, Muscat	18 February 2022	Scorecard
2.00	1.2–0–2–4	Steve Tikolo	Kenya	Scotland	ICC Global Cricket Academy, Dubai	19 November 2013	Scorecard
2.20	1.5–0–4–5	Moazzam Baig	Malawi	Cameroon	University of Dar es Salaam Ground, Dar es Salaam	25 September 2024	Scorecard
2.25	1.3–0–1–4	Chamal Sadun	Cyprus	Turkey	Tikkurila Cricket Ground, Vantaa	16 July 2022	Scorecard
2.25	1.3–0–1–4	Yalinde Nkanya	Tanzania	Sierra Leone	Gahanga International Cricket Stadium, Kigali	1 December 2022	Scorecard
2.25	1.3–0–14–4	Peter Aho	Nigeria	Rwanda	Tafawa Balewa Square Cricket Oval, Lagos	14 October 2023	Scorecard
Qualification: Minimum four wickets taken. Bowling figures indicate: "Overs-Maidens-Runs-Wickets". Last Updated: 23 December 2025

=== Most runs conceded in an innings ===
Runs	Bowling figure	Bowler	Team	Opposition	Venue	Date	Scorecard
93	4–0–93–0	Musa Jobarteh	Gambia	Zimbabwe	Ruaraka Sports Club Ground, Nairobi	23 October 2024	Scorecard
81	4–0–81–0	Liam McCarthy	Ireland	West Indies	Bready Cricket Club Ground, Bready	15 June 2025	Scorecard
75	4–0–75–0	Kasun Rajitha	Sri Lanka	Australia	Adelaide Oval, Adelaide	27 October 2019	Scorecard
72	4–0–72–1	Chris Sole	Scotland	New Zealand	The Grange Club, Edinburgh	27 July 2022	Scorecard
70	4 bowlers						
Bowling figures indicate: "Overs-Maidens-Runs-Wickets". Last Updated: 12 September 2025

=== Most wickets in a year ===
Wickets	Innings	Bowler	Team	Year
63	37	Ali Dawood	Bahrain	2025
55	30	Alpesh Ramjani	Uganda	2023
55	34	Rizwan Butt	Bahrain	2025
49	30	Henry Ssenyondo	Uganda	2023
48	27	Umair Tariq	Austria	2025
Updated: 14 December 2025

=== Most wickets in a series ===
Wickets	Innings	Bowler	Team	Series
25	11	Alpesh Ramjani	Uganda	2023 East Africa T20 Cup
22	10	Henry Ssenyondo	Uganda	2024 Continent Cup T20 Africa
21	6	Dinesh Nakrani	Uganda	2021 ICC Men's T20 World Cup Africa Group A Qualifier
20	12	Kenneth Waiswa	Uganda	2023 East Africa T20 Cup
18	5 players			
Updated: 13 December 2024

== Fielding records ==
=== Most catches in career ===
Catches	Innings	Fielder	Team	Span
86	139	David Miller†	South Africa	2010–2026
83	155	Mohammad Nabi†	Afghanistan	2010–2026
80	128	Sharvin Muniandy†	Malaysia	2019–2026
77	156	George Dockrell†	Ireland	2010–2026
76	99	Muhammad Waseem†	United Arab Emirates	2021–2026
The list excludes catches made as wicket-keeper Last updated: 14 October 2026

== Wicket-keeping records ==
=== Most dismissals ===
Dismissals	Innings	Player	Team	Catches	Stumpings	Span
117	109	Quinton de Kock†	South Africa	98	19	2012–2026
109 (Note: Cricinfo lists Buttler as having made 1 catch as a fielder whilst being the designated keeper, whilst their description of the catch says he was the wicket-keeper at the time. Their wicket-keeping totals (both catches and total dismissals) fail to include this dismissal; if this catch is counted towards his wicket-keeping total it gives him a total of 88 catches and 110 dismissals, which are the totals given in other sources.)	130	Jos Buttler†	England	87	22	2011–2026
91	97	MS Dhoni	India	57	34	2006–2019
90	62	Irfan Karim†	Kenya	64	26	2013–2026
89	98	Didier Ndikubwimana†	Rwanda	74	15	2021–2026
Innings refers to instances of the player playing as the designated wicket-keeper. Catches only include dismissals made as a wicket-keeper. Updated: 20 July 2026

=== Most catches ===
Catches	Innings	Wicket-keeper	Team	Span
98	109	Quinton de Kock†	South Africa	2012–2026
87	130	Jos Buttler†	England	2012–2026
74	98	Didier Ndikubwimana†	Rwanda	2021–2026
69	84	Scott Edwards†	Netherlands	2018–2026
64	62	Irfan Karim†	Kenya	2013–2026
Innings refers to instances of the player playing as the designated wicket-keeper. Catches only include dismissals made as a wicket-keeper. Updated: 20 July 2026

=== Most stumpings ===
Stumpings	Innings	Wicket-keeper	Team	Span
34	97	MS Dhoni	India	2006–2019
32	53	Kamran Akmal	Pakistan	2006–2017
30	82	Mushfiqur Rahim	Bangladesh	2006–2022
28	71	Mohammad Shahzad	Afghanistan	2010–2023
26	62	Irfan Karim†	Kenya	2013–2026
Innings refers to instances of the player playing as the designated wicket-keeper. Updated:20 July 2026

== Individual records (others) ==
=== Most matches ===
Matches	Player	Team	Span
163	Jos Buttler†	England	2011–2026
163	Paul Stirling†	Ireland	2009–2026
159	George Dockrell†	Ireland	2010–2026
159	Rohit Sharma	India	2007–2024
155	Mohammad Nabi†	Afghanistan	2010–2026
Updated: 12 October 2026

=== Most matches as captain ===
Matches	Player	Team	Won	Lost	Tied	NR	Span
91	Gerhard Erasmus†	Namibia	53	37	1	0	2019–2026
90	Clinton Rubagumya†	Rwanda	25	63	0	2	2021–2025
85	Babar Azam	Pakistan	48	29	1	7	2019–2024
77	Sikandar Raza†	Zimbabwe	33	42	0	2	2015–2026
76	Aaron Finch	Australia	40	32	1	3	2014–2022
76	Danilson Hawoe†	Indonesia	30	44	0	2	2024–2026
Updated: 14 October 2026

=== Most matches won as captain ===
Won	Player	Team	Matches	Lost	Tie	NR	Span
54	Gerhard Erasmus† (Note: Includes one win via a super over tie-breaker after the match was tied.)	Namibia	91	37	0	0	2019–2026
50	Rohit Sharma (Note: Includes one win via a super over tie-breaker after the match was tied.)	India	62	12	0	0	2017–2024
48	Babar Azam (Note: Includes one defeat via a super over tie-breaker after the match was tied.)	Pakistan	85	29	0	7	2019–2024
45	Brian Masaba†	Uganda	59	11	0	3	2021–2024
44	Eoin Morgan (Note: Includes two wins via a super over tie-breaker after the match was tied.)	England	72	27	0	1	2012–2022
Updated: 18 February 2026

=== Oldest players ===
Age	Player	Team	Last T20I
65 years, 334 days	Foster Morgan	Costa Rica	18 November 2026
62 years, 147 days	Andrew Brownlee	Falkland Islands	12 March 2025
60 years, 192 days	Joseph Lucky	Costa Rica	20 April 2025
59 years, 181 days	Osman Goker	Turkey	29 August 2019
57 years, 260 days	David Lambasa	Croatia	31 August 2025
Updated: 18 November 2026

=== Oldest debutants ===
Debut age	Player	Team	T20I debut
65 years, 333 days	Foster Morgan	Costa Rica	17 November 2026
62 years, 145 days	Andrew Brownlee	Falkland Islands	10 March 2025
60 years, 189 days	Joseph Lucky	Costa Rica	17 April 2025
59 years, 181 days	Osman Goker	Turkey	29 August 2019
57 years, 258 days	David Lambasa	Croatia	29 August 2025
Updated: 17 November 2026

=== Youngest players ===
Debut age	Player	Team	T20I debut
14 years, 16 days	Marian Gherasim	Romania	16 October 2020
14 years, 207 days	Alkinoos Manatos	Greece	25 June 2021
14 years, 211 days	Meet Bhavsar	Kuwait	20 January 2019
14 years, 311 days	George Sesay	Sierra Leone	19 October 2021
15 years, 64 days	Oscar Duff	Bulgaria	21 August 2024
Updated: 15 November 2024

=== Most consecutive matches ===
Matches	Player	Team	Span
126*	Syed Aziz	Malaysia	2019–2026
125	Nizakat Khan	Hong Kong	2015–2026
91	Muhammad Waseem	United Arab Emirates	2021–2025
84*	Muhammad Nadir	Rwanda	2023–2026
84*	Mohammed Aslam	Kuwait	2019–2026
An asterisk (*) indicates an ongoing streak. Updated: 14 October 2026

=== Most player of the match awards ===
Awards	Player	Team	Matches	Span
25	Virandeep Singh†	Malaysia	131	2019–2026
21	Sikandar Raza†	Zimbabwe	146	2013–2026
17	Suryakumar Yadav†	India	113	2021–2026
16	Virat Kohli	India	125	2010–2024
15	Sami Sohail†	Malawi	75	2019–2026
15	Syed Aziz†	Malaysia	137	2019–2026
Last updated: 30 October 2026

=== Most player of the series awards ===
Awards	Player	Team	Matches	Series	Span
7	Virat Kohli	India	125	46	2010–2024
6	Suryakumar Yadav†	India	113	28	2021–2026
6	Wanindu Hasaranga†	Sri Lanka	101	31	2019–2026
5	Babar Azam†	Pakistan	145	41	2016–2026
5	David Warner	Australia	110	42	2009–2024
5	Shakib Al Hasan†	Bangladesh	129	45	2006–2024
Last updated: 12 October 2026

== Partnership records ==
=== Highest overall partnership runs by a pair ===
Runs	Innings	Players	Batting team	Highest	Average	100/50	T20I career span
3,300	73	Babar Azam & Mohammad Rizwan	Pakistan	203*	46.47	10/15	2019–2024
2,255	68	Kusal Mendis & Pathum Nissanka	Sri Lanka	121	33.65	1/16	2022–2026
2,184	79	Andrew Balbirnie & Paul Stirling	Ireland	103	28.00	1/16	2015–2024
2,107	67	Kushal Bhurtel & Aasif Sheikh	Nepal	134	31.44	4/9	2021–2026
1,897	42	KL Rahul & Rohit Sharma	India	165	46.26	5/10	2016–2022
Updated: 30 June 2026

=== Highest partnerships (any wicket) ===
Runs	Wicket	Players	Batting team	Opposition	Venue	Date	Scorecard
258*	1st	Lachlan Yamamoto-Lake & Kendel Kadowaki-Fleming	Japan	China	Mission Road Ground, Mong Kok	15 February 2024	Scorecard
238	1st	Ben Kohler-Cadmore & Musadiq Ahmed	Germany	Austria	Bayer Uerdingen Cricket Ground, Krefeld	1 May 2026	Scorecard
236	1st	Hazratullah Zazai & Usman Ghani	Afghanistan	Ireland	Rajiv Gandhi International Cricket Stadium, Dehradun	23 February 2019	Scorecard
233	2nd	Jos Buttler & Harry Brook	England	India	Rose Bowl, Southampton	11 July 2026	Scorecard
223	1st	Aaron Finch & D'Arcy Short	Australia	Zimbabwe	Harare Sports Club, Harare	3 July 2018	Scorecard
An asterisk (*) signifies an unbroken partnership (i.e. neither of the batsmen was dismissed before the end of the innings. Last updated: 11 July 2026

=== Highest partnerships (by wicket) ===
Partnership	Runs	Batsmen		Team	Opposition	Venue	Date	Scorecard
1st wicket	258*	Lachlan Yamamoto-Lake	Kendel Kadowaki-Fleming	Japan	China	Mission Road Ground, Mong Kok	15 February 2024	Scorecard
2nd wicket	233	Jos Buttler	Harry Brook	England	India	Rose Bowl, Southampton	11 July 2026	Scorecard
3rd wicket	193	Kushal Malla	Rohit Paudel	Nepal	Mongolia	Zhejiang University of Technology Cricket Field, Zhejiang	27 September 2023	Scorecard
4th wicket	208*	Manpreet Singh	Girin Gune	Singapore	Indonesia	Singapore National Cricket Ground, Singapore	25 June 2026	Scorecard
5th wicket	190*	Rohit Sharma	Rinku Singh	India	Afghanistan	M. Chinnaswamy Stadium, Bengaluru	17 January 2024	Scorecard
6th wicket	142	Azmatullah Omarzai	Ijaz Ahmad Ahmadzai	Afghanistan	Zimbabwe	Sharjah Cricket Stadium, Sharjah	29 October 2026	Scorecard
7th wicket	110	Zane Green	Alexander Volschenk	Namibia	Zimbabwe	Namibia Cricket Ground, Windhoek	31 August 2026	Scorecard
8th wicket	89	Romario Shepherd	Jason Holder	West Indies	South Africa	Narendra Modi Stadium, Ahmedabad	26 February 2026	Scorecard
9th wicket	132*	Saber Zakhil	Saqlain Ali	Belgium	Austria	Royal Brussels Cricket Club, Waterloo	24 July 2021	Scorecard
10th wicket	62*	Khengar Ahir	Nikunj Ahir	Panama	Argentina	Sir Vivian Richards Stadium, North Sound	10 November 2021	Scorecard
An asterisk (*) signifies an unbroken partnership (i.e. neither of the batsmen was dismissed before either the end of the allotted overs or the required score being reached). Last updated: 29 October 2026

== Umpiring records ==
=== Most matches as an umpire ===
Matches	Umpire	Country	T20I Career Span
117	Viswanadan Kalidas†	Malaysia	2019–2026
93	Langton Rusere†	Zimbabwe	2015–2026
91	Ahsan Raza†	Pakistan	2010–2026
85	Buddhi Pradhan†	Nepal	2012–2026
84	Isaac Oyieko†	Kenya	2007–2026
Updated: 30 October 2026

=== Most matches as a match referee ===
Matches	Referee	Country	T20I Career Span
215	Jeff Crowe†	New Zealand	2005–2026
214	Andy Pycroft†	Zimbabwe	2009–2026
197	Ranjan Madugalle†	Sri Lanka	2006–2026
155	Javagal Srinath†	India	2006–2026
144	Richie Richardson†	West Indies	2016–2026
Updated: 30 October 2026

== See also ==
- List of Test cricket records
- List of One Day International cricket records
- List of women's Twenty20 International records
