= List of Romania Twenty20 International cricketers =

This is a list of Romanian Twenty20 International cricketers.

In April 2018, the ICC decided to grant full Twenty20 International (T20I) status to all its members. Therefore, all Twenty20 matches played between Romania and other ICC members after 1 January 2019 have T20I status.

This list comprises names all members of the Romania cricket team who have played at least one T20I match. It is initially arranged in the order in which each player won his first Twenty20 cap. Where more than one player won his first Twenty20 cap in the same match, those players are listed alphabetically by surname (according to the name format used by Cricinfo).

Romania played their first match with T20I status on 29 August 2019 against Austria during the 2019 Romania T20 Cup.

== Key ==
General

- ‡ – Captain
- † – Wicket-keeper
- First – Year of debut
- Last – Year of latest game
- Mat – Number of matches played

Batting

- Runs – Runs scored in career
- HS – Highest score
- Avg – Runs scored per dismissal
- * – Batsman remained not out
- 50 – Half-centuries scored
- 100 – Centuries scored

Bowling

- Balls – Balls bowled in career
- Wkt – Wickets taken in career
- BBI – Best bowling in an innings
- Ave – Average runs per wicket

Fielding

- Ca – Catches taken
- St – Stumpings affected

== List of players ==
Statistics are correct as of 30 July 2026.

Romania T20I cricketers
General					Batting					Bowling				Fielding		Ref
No.	Name	First	Last	Mat	Runs	HS	Avg	50	100	Balls	Wkt	BBI	Ave	Ca	St	Ref
1	Pavel Florin	2019	2021	16	26	14	8.44	0	0	141	15	3/14	12.13	1	0	
2	Laurentiu Gherasim	2019	2023	8	0	0	0.00	0	0	15	1	1/12	18.00	0	0	
3	Ijaz Hussain	2019	2026	31	212	40	12.47	0	0	532	39	4/28	17.28	4	0	
4	Imran Haider†	2019	2021	4	38	19	12.66	0	0	–	–	–	–	4	2	
5	Rajesh Kumar	2019	2024	15	79	32	13.16	0	0	215	8	2/25	42.12	5	0	
6	Gohar Manan	2019	2025	18	252	40	14.82	0	0	–	–	–	–	5	0	
7	Sivakumar Periyalwar	2019	2025	42	570	105*	23.75	3	1	1	0	–	–	7	0	
8	Sadeeq Khan	2019	2019	3	64	28	32.00	0	0	72	2	1/21	31.50	1	0	
9	Ramesh Satheesan‡	2019	2026	60	1,623	99*	33.12	12	0	293	15	3/14	24.66	18	0	
10	Shantanu Vashisht	2019	2026	41	188	36	11.05	0	0	541	28	4/22	19.92	26	0	
11	Cosmin Zavoiu	2019	2023	21	61	27	8.71	0	0	53	6	3/4	13.50	6	0	
12	Abdul Shakoor†	2019	2023	19	207	31*	18.81	0	0	–	–	–	–	8	4	
13	Petre Danci	2019	2020	4	19	12	9.50	0	0	–	–	–	–	2	0	
14	Dharmendra Manani	2019	2021	3	37	19*	37.00	0	0	42	2	2/25	26.00	2	0	
15	Satvik Nadigotla†	2019	2026	37	422	55	15.62	1	0	74	4	3/30	20.25	31	5	
16	Rajendra Pisal†	2019	2025	11	21	12	7.00	0	0	18	3	3/4	1.33	9	1	
17	Aftab Kayani	2020	2022	8	32	20	10.66	0	0	114	9	2/6	12.88	2	0	
18	Asif Bevinje	2020	2024	10	116	35	14.50	0	0	203	14	5/30	17.71	1	0	
19	Marian Gherasim	2020	2022	12	2	2	1.00	0	0	44	1	1/22	59.00	3	0	
20	Vasu Saini‡	2020	2026	71	1,475	91*	31.38	7	0	1137	53	5/17	27.20	37	0	
21	Sami Ullah	2020	2021	9	106	33	17.66	0	0	168	15	3/10	13.00	2	0	
22	Patras Masih	2020	2020	3	13	13	13.00	0	0	54	2	2/18	24.50	0	0	
23	Waqar Abbasi	2020	2021	3	0	0	0.00	0	0	66	4	2/30	19.75	1	0	
24	Taranjeet Singh	2021	2026	56	1,699	110	34.67	10	1	866	52	4/17	19.30	27	0	
25	Sudeep Thakur	2021	2023	6	107	55	53.50	1	0	72	3	2/36	34.00	0	0	
26	Gaurav Mishra	2022	2023	12	70	24	17.50	0	0	198	6	2/18	40.33	5	0	
27	Sukhkaran Sahi	2022	2023	5	1	1	1.00	0	0	33	1	1/30	54.00	1	0	
28	Senthilvel Karthikeyan	2022	2022	2	–	–	–	–	–	–	–	–	–	0	0	
29	Manmeet Koli	2022	2026	47	135	33*	15.00	0	0	1007	62	5/12	20.27	11	0	
30	Rohit Kumar†	2022	2026	17	259	47*	18.50	0	0	–	–	–	–	10	1	
31	Pratham Hingorani	2023	2026	9	1	1	1.00	0	0	39	3	2/17	19.00	3	0	
32	Luca Petre	2023	2026	23	33	9*	16.50	0	0	192	12	2/10	24.00	7	0	
33	Baljinder Singh	2023	2023	1	6	6	6.00	0	0	18	1	1/29	29.00	0	0	
34	Mahesh Prasanna	2023	2023	4	24	18*	12.00	0	0	78	4	2/40	32.25	0	0	
35	Kaka Vimlesh	2023	2025	6	68	39	34.00	0	0	–	–	–	–	3	0	
36	Ravindra Athapaththu	2023	2024	7	47	28*	–	0	0	144	11	3/23	18.00	2	0	
37	Muhammad Moiz	2024	2025	19	157	25	9.81	0	0	320	25	3/18	17.44	14	0	
38	Anand Rajshekara	2024	2024	8	106	50	21.20	1	0	–	–	–	–	1	0	
39	Ali Hussain	2024	2025	10	16	9	5.33	0	0	144	3	1/21	74.66	4	0	
40	Adrian Lascu	2024	2026	21	523	72*	34.86	3	0	132	7	5/21	29.71	12	0	
41	Rameez Khan	2024	2026	19	94	23	9.40	0	0	258	21	5/22	14.42	3	0	
42	Avishka Iroshan	2025	2026	33	595	66	28.33	2	0	140	11	4/10	18.63	15	0	
43	Md Ariyan†	2025	2026	30	512	93*	25.60	3	0	–	–	–	–	18	1	
44	Ravinder Gill	2025	2025	2	1	1*	–	0	0	12	0	–	–	1	0	
45	Janitha Fernando	2025	2026	16	189	38	18.90	0	0	267	11	2/18	30.72	8	0	
46	Josak Khadka	2025	2026	17	4	2*	4.00	0	0	330	15	3/27	31.46	5	0	
47	Tharindu Sandaruwan	2025	2026	19	85	31	9.44	0	0	249	16	3/5	20.00	9	0	
48	Chamalka Fernando†	2026	2026	4	35	24*	17.50	0	0	18	0	–	–	2	0	
49	Dilum Fernando	2026	2026	3	18	11*	18.00	0	0	54	5	3/19	12.60	0	0	
50	Eranga De Silva†	2026	2026	8	60	20*	20.00	0	0	–	–	–	–	6	1	
51	Irfan Ringku	2026	2026	18	395	68	24.68	3	0	347	32	4/19	12.00	4	0	
52	Parveen Kumar	2026	2026	2	18	18	18.00	0	0	–	–	–	–	1	0	
53	Nazmus Sakib	2026	2026	5	–	–	–	–	–	108	9	3/21	10.55	0	0	
54	Shahab Alam	2026	2026	4	3	2	1.50	0	0	–	–	–	–	2	0	
55	Gihan Sanjeewa	2026	2026	5	10	10	5.00	0	0	75	2	1/22	35.50	1	0	
56	Umair Safi	2026	2026	2	3	3*	–	0	0	48	1	1/22	38.00	0	0	
57	Taimoor Nasir	2026	2026	3	–	–	–	–	–	24	2	2/10	5.00	1	0	
