= 2021 Sofia Twenty20 =

International cricket tournament

- Dates: 24 – 27 June 2021
- Administrator: Bulgarian Cricket Federation
- Cricket format: Twenty20 International
- Host: Bulgaria
- Champions: Romania
- Runners-up: Bulgaria
- Participants: 4
- Matches: 9
- Player of the series: (Romania) Taranjeet Singh
- Most runs: (Romania) Ramesh Satheesan (197)
- Most wickets: (Romania) Sami Ullah (7) (Romania) Pavel Florin (7)

The 2021 Sofia Twenty20 tournament was a Twenty20 International (T20I) cricket tournament held in Bulgaria in June 2021. The tournament was played at the National Sports Academy in Sofia and was arranged to mark 20 years since the founding of the Bulgarian Cricket Federation. In addition to the hosts Bulgaria, the competing nations were Greece, Romania and Serbia. The tournament consisted of a round-robin stage, followed by semi-finals and a final.

Romania topped the round-robin stage to set up a semi-final match against Serbia, with Bulgaria and Greece playing in the second semi-final, which ended as a no result due to rain. After winning their semi-final against Serbia, Romania defeated Bulgaria by 7 wickets in the final.

== Squads ==
Bulgaria	Greece	Romania	Serbia
Prakash Mishra (c); Hristo Lakov (vc); Jacob Albin; Sulaiman Ali; Rohan Bhavesh Patel; Kevin D'Souza; Aravinda De Silva; Vasil Hristov; Boiko Ivanov; Hristo Ivanov (wk); Ivaylo Katzarski; Aswad Khan; Fayaz Mohammad; Nikolay Nankov; Dimo Nikolov; Bakhtiar Tahiri; Delrick Varghese; Nikolay Yordanov	Anastasios Manousis (c, wk); Arsalan Ahmed; Asrar Ahmed; Syed Amanullah; Georgios Galanis; Spiridon Gasteratos; Nikolaos Katechis; Alexandros Lagos; Alkinoos Manatos; Amarpreet Mehmi; Aslam Mohammad; Nikolaos Mourikis; Spiros Siriotis; Spiros Tsirigotis; Thomas Zotos	Ramesh Satheesan (c); Waqar Abbasi; Pavel Florin; Ijaz Hussain; Aftab Kayani; Gohar Manan; Patras Masih; Satvik Nadigotla (wk); Sivakumar Periyalwar; Vasu Saini; Abdul Shakoor (wk); Taranjeet Singh; Sudeep Thakur; Sami Ullah; Shantanu Vashisht; Cosmin Zavoiu	Aleksa Djorovic (c); Rahman Ademi; Wintley Burton; Brett Davidson; Dragan Djokic; Michael Dorgan; Bogdan Dugic; Leslie Dunbar (wk); Nicholas Johns-Wickberg; Apon Mustafizur; Danijel Petrovic; Jovan Reb; Matija Sarenac; Slobodan Tosic; Nemanja Zimonjic; Vukasin Zimonjic

== Round-robin ==
=== Points table ===
Team	P	W	L	T	NR	Pts	NRR
Romania	3	3	0	0	0	6	+4.011
Bulgaria	3	2	1	0	0	4	+1.200
Greece	3	1	2	0	0	2	–1.445
Serbia	3	0	3	0	0	0	–3.502

=== Matches ===
24 June 2021
14:00
Scorecard

Bulgaria; 208/2 (20 overs)	v	Serbia; 147/5 (20 overs)
Aravinda De Silva 100* (60); Vukasin Zimonjic 1/31 (4 overs)		Slobodan Tosic 38* (57); Hristo Lakov 2/8 (4 overs)

Bulgaria won by 61 runs
National Sports Academy, Sofia
Umpires: Ioannis Afthinos (Gre) and Sudeep Thakur (Rom)
Player of the match: Aravinda De Silva (Bul)

- Serbia won the toss and elected to field.
- Jacob Albin, Aswad Khan (Bul), Wintley Burton, Brett Davidson, Michael Dorgan, Nicholas Johns-Wickberg, Slobodan Tosic, Nemanja Zimonjic and Vukasin Zimonjic (Srb) all made their T20I debuts.
- Aravinda De Silva became the first batsman for Bulgaria to score a century in T20Is.

24 June 2021
17:30
Scorecard

Greece; 157/8 (20 overs)	v	Romania; 159/7 (12.5 overs)
Aslam Mohammad 61 (42); Shantanu Vashisht 4/22 (4 overs)		Ramesh Satheesan 70 (32); Spiridon Gasteratos 2/4 (1 over)

Romania won by 3 wickets
National Sports Academy, Sofia
Umpires: Stefan Nerandzic (Srb) and Nisarg Shah (Bul)
Player of the match: Ramesh Satheesan (Rom)

- Greece won the toss and elected to bat.
- Syed Amanullah, Spiridon Gasteratos, Nikolaos Mourikis, Spiros Siriotis, Thomas Zotos (Gre) and Taranjeet Singh (Rom) all made their T20I debuts.

25 June 2021
10:00
Scorecard

Serbia; 144 (20 overs)	v	Greece; 147/5 (14.3 overs)
Nicholas Johns-Wickberg 24 (17); Spiridon Gasteratos 2/12 (4 overs)		Aslam Mohammad 54 (25); Vukasin Zimonjic 2/27 (4 overs)

Greece won by 5 wickets
National Sports Academy, Sofia
Umpires: Ivan Dimitrov (Bul) and Nisarg Shah (Bul)
Player of the match: Aslam Mohammad (Gre)

- Greece won the toss and elected to field.
- Alkinoos Manatos (Gre) made his T20I debut.

25 June 2021
13:30
Scorecard

Bulgaria; 157/8 (20 overs)	v	Romania; 161/3 (14 overs)
Sulaiman Ali 32 (16); Taranjeet Singh 3/27 (4 overs)		Taranjeet Singh 60 (22); Prakash Mishra 1/16 (3 overs)

Romania won by 7 wickets
National Sports Academy, Sofia
Umpires: Ioannis Afthinos (Gre) and Stefan Nerandzic (Srb)
Player of the match: Taranjeet Singh (Rom)

- Bulgaria won the toss and elected to bat.
- Sudeep Thakur (Rom) made his T20I debut.

25 June 2021
17:00
Scorecard

Romania; 191 (19.2 overs)	v	Serbia; 100 (16.5 overs)
Sudeep Thakur 55 (31); Nicholas Johns-Wickberg 3/19 (4 overs)		Wintley Burton 22 (12); Pavel Florin 3/14 (3.5 overs)

Romania won by 91 runs
National Sports Academy, Sofia
Umpires: Ioannis Afthinos (Gre) and Nisarg Shah (Bul)
Player of the match: Sudeep Thakur (Rom)

- Romania won the toss and elected to bat.

26 June 2021
10:00
Scorecard

Bulgaria; 197/4 (20 overs)	v	Greece; 133 (16.5 overs)
Hristo Lakov 68* (47); Asrar Ahmed 2/33 (4 overs)		Anastasios Manousis 27 (19); Prakash Mishra 3/12 (1.5 overs)

Bulgaria won by 64 runs
National Sports Academy, Sofia
Umpires: Andrew Begg (Rom) and Stefan Nerandzic (Srb)
Player of the match: Prakash Mishra (Bul)

- Greece won the toss and elected to field.

== Play-offs ==
=== 1st Semi-final ===
26 June 2021
13:30
Scorecard

Serbia; 115/7 (20 overs)	v	Romania; 116/0 (5.4 overs)
Leslie Dunbar 55* (41); Pavel Florin 2/22 (3 overs)		Taranjeet Singh 57* (19)

Romania won by 10 wickets
National Sports Academy, Sofia
Umpires: Ioannis Afthinos (Gre) and Nisarg Shah (Bul)
Player of the match: Taranjeet Singh (Rom)

- Serbia won the toss and elected to bat.

=== 2nd Semi-final ===
26 June 2021
17:00
Scorecard

Bulgaria; 140 (19.5 overs)	v	Greece; 33/2 (3.5 overs)
Bakhtiar Tahiri 49 (45); Georgios Galanis 3/17 (4 overs)		Anastasios Manousis 17* (10); Hristo Lakov 1/2 (0.5 overs)

No result
National Sports Academy, Sofia
Umpires: Andrew Begg (Rom) and Stefan Nerandzic (Srb)

- Greece won the toss and elected to field.
- No further play was possible due to rain. Bulgaria advanced to the final due to finishing second in the round-robin.

=== Final ===
27 June 2021
11:00
Scorecard

Bulgaria; 115/9 (20 overs)	v	Romania; 119/3 (10.2 overs)
Sulaiman Ali 21 (19); Vasu Saini 4/12 (4 overs)		Taranjeet Singh 39 (16); Rohan Bhavesh Patel 1/13 (2 overs)

Romania won by 7 wickets
National Sports Academy, Sofia
Umpires: Ioannis Afthinos (Gre) and Stefan Nerandzic (Srb)
Player of the match: Sami Ullah (Rom)

- Bulgaria won the toss and elected to bat.
