= Turkey national cricket team =

Turkish national cricket team

Turkey
- Flag of Turkey
- Association: Cricket Turkey

Personnel
- Captain: Muhammad Fahad

International Cricket Council
- ICC status: Associate member (2017); Affiliate member (2008)
- ICC region: Europe
ICC Rankings	Current	Best-ever
T20I	91st	73rd (19 July 2022)

International cricket
- First international: v Estonia at Corfu, Greece, 7 September 2009

T20 Internationals
- First T20I: v Luxembourg at Moara Vlasiei Cricket Ground, Moara Vlăsiei, 29 August 2019
- Last T20I: v France at Moara Vlasei Cricket Ground, Ilfov County; 29 July 2026
T20Is	Played	Won/Lost
Total	29	3/25 (0 ties, 1 no result)
This year	9	1/8 (0 ties, 0 no results)
T20I home kit
T20I away kit
- As of 29 July 2026

The Turkish national cricket team represents Turkey in international cricket. They were granted affiliate status by the International Cricket Council (ICC) in June 2008, and became associate member in 2017.

== History ==
An official national cricket league for Turkey was created in 2004, following on from previous ad hoc tournaments. The sport was introduced by Pakistani expatriates studying at Bilkent University and Middle East Technical University in Ankara. By 2009 the national league had five teams in Ankara and one team in Istanbul, and had begun to spread to native Turkish players.

In September 2009 Turkey took part in the 2009 European Cricket Championship Division 5 in Corfu, Greece. This was their first international cricket tournament. Turkey recorded their first win in international cricket against Bulgaria during the tournament, although this could not stop them finishing sixth and last.

=== 2018-Present ===
In April 2018, the ICC decided to grant full Twenty20 International (T20I) status to all its members. Therefore, all Twenty20 matches played between Turkey and other ICC members after 1 January 2019 have the full T20I status.

Turkey played their first T20I match against Luxembourg on 29 August 2019 during the 2019 Continental Cup in Romania.

29 August 2019
12:15
Scorecard

Turkey; 28 (11.3 overs)	v	Luxembourg; 29/2 (3.1 overs)
Hasan Helva 7 (15); Ankush Nanda 5/6 (2.3 overs)		Vikram Vijh 11* (3); Serkan Kizilkaya 2/9 (1 over)

Luxembourg won by 8 wickets
Moara Vlasiei Cricket Ground, Ilfov County
Umpires: Mark Jameson (Ger) and Thomas Kentorp (Den)

- Turkey won the toss and elected to bat.

On 24 June 2023, Turkey registered their first win in T20Is against Croatia, in the 2023 Bulgaria Quadrangular Series. Turkey defeated Croatia by 8 wickets, by chasing a target of 84.

24 June 2023
09:00
Scorecard

Croatia; 83/8 (20 overs)	v	Turkey; 88/2 (6 overs)
Sohail Ahmad 20 (16); Muhammed Turkmen 3/7 (3 overs)		Ali Turkmen 40* (18); Vedran Zanko 2/9 (2 overs)

Turkey won by 8 wickets
National Sports Academy, Sofia
Umpires: Ivan Dimitrov (Bul) and Sam Romeo Ranjan (Bul)
Player of the match: Muhammed Turkmen (Tur)

- Croatia won the toss and elected to bat.
- Cihan Altun (Tur) made his T20I debut.

== Squad ==
- Mecit Ozturk
- Gokhan Alta (c)
- Ilyas Ataullah
- Cagri Bayraktar
- Hasan Cakir
- Zafer Durmaz
- Shamsullah Ehsan
- Ishak Elec
- Emin Kuyumcu
- Deniz Mutu
- Romeo Nath (wk)
- Tunahan Turan
- Ali Turkmen
- Tunahan Ulutuna
- Dr Mohsin Azam

== Records ==
International Match Summary — Turkey

Last updated 29 July 2026.

Playing Record
Format	M	W	L	T	NR	Inaugural Match
Twenty20 Internationals	29	3	25	0	1	29 August 2019

=== Twenty20 International ===
- Highest team total: 147 v. Bulgaria on 24 June 2023 at National Sports Academy, Sofia.
- Highest individual score: 52, Ishak Elec v. Bulgaria on 24 June 2023 at National Sports Academy, Sofia.
- Best individual bowling figures: 4/31, Ishak Elec v. Isle of Man on 18 July 2022 at Kerava National Cricket Ground, Kerava.

T20I record versus other nations

Records complete to T20I #4052. Last updated 29 July 2026.

Opponent	M	W	L	T	NR	First match	First win
vs Associate Members
Austria	2	0	2	0	0	31 August 2019	
Bulgaria	3	1	2	0	0	24 June 2023	12 July 2025
Croatia	2	1	0	0	1	24 June 2023	24 June 2023
Cyprus	1	0	1	0	0	15 July 2022	
Czech Republic	1	0	1	0	0	30 August 2019	
Denmark	1	0	1	0	0	9 July 2026	
Estonia	1	0	1	0	0	13 July 2026	
France	3	0	3	0	0	15 June 2024	
Gibraltar	2	0	2	0	0	11 July 2025	
Hungary	1	0	1	0	0	12 July 2026	
Isle of Man	2	0	2	0	0	18 July 2022	
Israel	1	1	0	0	0	28 July 2026	28 July 2026
Italy	1	0	1	0	0	13 June 2024	
Luxembourg	2	0	2	0	0	29 August 2019	
Norway	1	0	1	0	0	10 July 2026	
Romania	3	0	3	0	0	29 August 2019	
Serbia	2	0	2	0	0	15 July 2022	

== See also ==
- List of Turkey Twenty20 International cricketers
