= Maltese cricket team in Bulgaria in 2020–21 =

International cricket tour

	Bulgaria	Malta
- Dates: 23 – 24 September 2020
Captains	Prakash Mishra	Samuel Aquilina

Twenty20 International series
- Results: Malta won the 4-match series 2–0
Most runs	Kiran Dasan (78)	Heinrich Gericke (114)
Most wickets	Sulaiman Ali (2); Bakhtiar Tahiri (2); Prakash Mishra (2)	Noshair Akhter (4); Amar Sharma (4); Salu Thomas Kanakalil (4)
- Player of the series: Heinrich Gericke (Mlt)

The Malta cricket team toured Bulgaria in September 2020 to play four Twenty20 International (T20I) matches. The matches were played on 23 and 24 September at the National Sports Academy "Vasil Levski" in Sofia, and were the first official T20I matches played in Bulgaria since the ICC announced that all matches between its member nations would be eligible for this status. Following the T20I series, the two sides played an additional four friendly T20 matches in the town of Gabrovo, 200 km west of Sofia, with the Bulgarians using those matches to give chances to players who would be eligible to play official matches for the national team from 2021. Malta won the T20I series 2–0 after both matches on the second day were abandoned due to rain, with even the toss not being possible in the second of the two matches on account of rain.

== Squads ==
Bulgaria	Malta
Prakash Mishra (c); Agagyul Ahmadhel; Sulaiman Ali; Rohan Bhavesh Patel; Kevin D'Souza; Aravinda De Silva; Kiran Dasan (wk); Boiko Ivanov; Hristo Ivanov (wk); Ivaylo Katzarski; Hristo Lakov (vc); Fayaz Mohammad; Bakhtiar Tahiri; Delrick Varghese	Samuel Aquilina (c)/(wk); Waseem Abbas; Noshair Akhter; Sujesh Appu; Gopal Chaturvedi; Heinrich Gericke; Michael Goonetilleke; Salu Thomas Kanakalil; Zeeshan Khan; Haroon Mughal; Amar Sharma (vc); Ravinder Singh; Samuel Stanislaus; Varun Thamotharam

== T20I series ==
=== 1st T20I ===
23 September 2020
10:00
Scorecard

Malta; 216/8 (20 overs)	v	Bulgaria; 159/8 (20 overs)
Ravinder Singh 34 (18); Sulaiman Ali 2/27 (2.1 overs)		Kiran Dasan 31 (25); Salu Thomas Kanakalil 4/31 (4 overs)

Malta won by 57 runs
National Sports Academy, Sofia
Umpires: Subhas Roy (Mlt) and Nisarg Shah (Bul)

- Malta won the toss and elected to bat.
- Sulaiman Ali, Kevin D'Souza, Aravinda De Silva, Rohan Bhavesh Patel, Bakhtiar Tahiri, Delrick Varghese (Bul), Noshair Akhter, Heinrich Gericke, Salu Thomas Kanakalil, Amar Sharma, Samuel Stanislaus and Varun Thamotharam (Mlt) all made their T20I debuts.

=== 2nd T20I ===
23 September 2020
14:30
Scorecard

Bulgaria; 184/6 (20 overs)	v	Malta; 185/2 (18.5 overs)
Kiran Dasan 47 (39); Noshair Akhter 3/35 (4 overs)		Heinrich Gericke 91 (54); Agagyul Ahmadhel 1/22 (2 overs)

Malta won by 8 wickets
National Sports Academy, Sofia
Umpires: Subhas Roy (Mlt) and Nisarg Shah (Bul)

- Bulgaria won the toss and elected to bat.

=== 3rd T20I ===
24 September 2020
10:00
Scorecard

Bulgaria; 6/0 (0.3 overs)	v	Malta
Fayaz Mohammad 5* (2)

No result
National Sports Academy, Sofia
Umpires: Ivan Dimitrov (Bul) and Subhas Roy (Mlt)

- Malta won the toss and elected to field.
- Only three deliveries were possible due to rain.
- Fayaz Mohammad (Bul) and Zeeshan Khan (Mlt) both made their T20I debuts.

=== 4th T20I ===
24 September 2020
14:30
Scorecard

Bulgaria	v	Malta

Match abandoned
National Sports Academy, Sofia
Umpires: Ivan Dimitrov (Bul) and Subhas Roy (Mlt)

- No toss
- No play was possible due to rain.
