= 2019 Continental Cup (cricket) =

Associate International Cricket Tournament

- Dates: 29 August – 1 September 2019
- Cricket format: Twenty20 International
- Tournament format(s): Round-robin, final
- Host: Romania
- Champions: Austria
- Runners-up: Czech Republic
- Participants: 5
- Matches: 11
- Most runs: (Czech Republic) Sudesh Wickramasekara (219)
- Most wickets: (Austria) Bilal Zalmai (9)

The 2019 Continental Cup was a Twenty20 International (T20I) cricket tournament held in Romania between 29 August and 1 September 2019. The hosts were the defending champions, having won the previous edition in 2018.

The format was originally to be two groups of three teams played over the first two days, followed by a series of play-off matches. However, after Russia withdrew two days before the tournament, the format was changed to a single round-robin stage followed by a final. The participating teams were hosts Romania, along with Austria, Czech Republic, Luxembourg and Turkey. All five teams played their first matches with T20I status during this tournament, following the decision of the ICC to grant full Twenty20 International status to all its members from 1 January 2019. Austria topped the round-robin stage and went on to defeat the Czech Republic in the final.

A number of T20I records were set during the tournament, particularly in games against Turkey who had been affected by visa problems resulting in many of their best players not being able to travel to Romania. These included Czech Republic's winning margin of 257 runs, in a game that also saw Sudesh Wickramasekara's innings of 106 in 36 balls equal the fastest century in T20I cricket and the then joint-highest T20I total (278/4).

== Squads ==
Austria	Czech Republic	Luxembourg	Romania	Turkey
Razmal Shigiwal (c); Habib Ahmadzai; Mirza Ahsan; Abdullah Akbarjan; Arsalan Arif; Zeshan Arif; Abrar Bilal; Aqib Iqbal; Kunal Joshi; Anthony Lark; Amit Nathwani; Abdul Rahman; Mark Simpson-Parker; Bilal Zalmai	Edward Knowles (c); Hilal Ahmad; Naveed Ahmed; Shaun Dalton; Sabawoon Davizi; Honey Gori; Arshad Hayat; Kushalkumar Mendon; Christopher Pearce; Sumit Pokhriyal; Shoumyadeep Rakshit; Paul Taylor; Sameera Waththage; Sudesh Wickramasekara	Tony Whiteman (c); James Barker; Timothy Barker; Marcus Cope; Mohit Dixit; Chris Fry; Atif Kamal; Joost Mees; Ankush Nanda; Richard Neale; Suhail Sadiq; Girish Venkateswaran; Vikram Vijh; Roshan Vishwanath	Ramesh Satheesan (c); Petre Danci; Pavel Florin; Laurentiu Gherasim; Imran Haider; Ijaz Hussain; Sadeeq Khan; Rajesh Kumar; Gohar Manan; Dharmendra Manani; Satvik Nadigotla; Sivakumar Periyalwar; Rajendra Pisal; Abdul Shakoor; Shantanu Vashisht; Cosmin Zavoiu	Recep Ulutuna (c); Cengiz Akyüz; Hasan Alta; Ahmet Dursak; Osman Goker; Hasan Helva; Serdar Kansoy; Serkan Kizilkaya; Mehmet Koc; Ali Kose; Mehmat Sert; Tunahan Turan; Ali Türkmen; Tunahan Ulutuna

== Round-robin ==
=== Points table ===
Team	Pld	W	L	T	NR	Pts	NRR	Status
Austria	4	3	1	0	0	6	+3.816	Advanced to the final
Czech Republic	4	3	1	0	0	6	+3.686	Advanced to the final
Romania	4	3	1	0	0	6	+2.848	
Luxembourg	4	1	3	0	0	2	-1.232	
Turkey	4	0	4	0	0	0	-10.674	

=== Fixtures ===
29 August 2019
09:00
Scorecard

Romania; 137/7 (20 overs)	v	Austria; 106 (19.4 overs)
Ijaz Hussain 35 (36); Bilal Zalmai 4/12 (4 overs)		Anthony Lark 30 (41); Ramesh Satheesan 3/14 (4 overs)

Romania won by 31 runs
Moara Vlasiei Cricket Ground, Ilfov County
Umpires: Mark Jameson (Ger) and Thomas Kentorp (Den)

- Austria won the toss and elected to field.
- Pavel Florin, Laurentiu Gherasim, Imran Haider, Ijaz Hussain, Sadeeq Khan, Rajesh Kumar, Gohar Manan, Sivakumar Periyalwar, Ramesh Satheesan, Shantanu Vashisht, Cosmin Zavoiu (Rom), Habib Ahmadzai, Mirza Ahsan, Abdullah Akbarjan, Abrar Bilal, Aqib Iqbal, Kunal Joshi, Anthony Lark, Amit Nathwani, Razmal Shigiwal, Mark Simpson-Parker and Bilal Zalmai (Aut) all made their T20I debuts.
- Austria and Romania both played their first men's T20I match.

29 August 2019
12:15
Scorecard

Turkey; 28 (11.3 overs)	v	Luxembourg; 29/2 (3.1 overs)
Hasan Helva 7 (15); Ankush Nanda 5/6 (2.3 overs)		Vikram Vijh 11* (3); Serkan Kizilkaya 2/9 (1 over)

Luxembourg won by 8 wickets
Moara Vlasiei Cricket Ground, Ilfov County
Umpires: Mark Jameson (Ger) and Thomas Kentorp (Den)

- Turkey won the toss and elected to bat.
- Timothy Barker, Chris Fry, Atif Kamal, Joost Mees, Ankush Nanda, Richard Neale, Suhail Sadiq, Girish Venkateswaran, Vikram Vijh, Roshan Vishwanath, Tony Whiteman (Lux), Cengiz Akyüz, Hasan Alta, Ahmet Dursak, Hasan Helva, Serdar Kansoy, Serkan Kizilkaya, Ali Kose, Mehmat Sert, Tunahan Turan, Recep Ulutuna and Tunahan Ulutuna (Tur) all made their T20I debuts.
- Luxembourg and Turkey both played their first men's T20I match.
- Ankush Nanda became the first bowler for Luxembourg to take a five-wicket haul in T20Is and took the best figures on debut in a T20I match.
- Turkey's score was the lowest team total in a completed T20I match.
- This was the highest margin of victory in T20I in terms of balls remaining, until beaten by Austria later in the tournament.

29 August 2019
15:30
Scorecard

Romania; 226/6 (20 overs)	v	Turkey; 53 (13 overs)
Sivakumar Periyalwar 105* (40); Serkan Kizilkaya 2/10 (3 overs)		Mehmat Sert 16 (27); Cosmin Zavoiu 3/4 (1 over)

Romania won by 173 runs
Moara Vlasiei Cricket Ground, Ilfov County
Umpires: Andrew Begg (Rom) and Thomas Kentorp (Den)

- Turkey won the toss and elected to field.
- Petre Danci, Dharmendra Manani, Satvik Nadigotla, Rajendra Pisal, Abdul Shakoor (Rom), Osman Goker and Mehmet Koc (Tur) all made their T20I debuts.
- Sivakumar Periyalwar became the first batsman for Romania to score a century in T20Is.
- This was the highest margin of victory by runs in a T20I until beaten by Czech Republic the following day.

30 August 2019
09:00
Scorecard

Czech Republic; 125/7 (20 overs)	v	Austria; 126/2 (14.4 overs)
Sudesh Wickramasekara 52 (33); Abdullah Akbarjan 2/20 (4 overs)		Bilal Zalmai 45 (23); Arshad Hayat 2/15 (3 overs)

Austria won by 8 wickets
Moara Vlasiei Cricket Ground, Ilfov County
Umpires: Mark Jameson (Ger) and Thomas Kentorp (Den)

- Austria won the toss and elected to field.
- Abdul Rahman (Aut), Hilal Ahmad, Naveed Ahmed, Honey Gori, Arshad Hayat, Edward Knowles, Kushalkumar Mendon, Sumit Pokhriyal, Shoumyadeep Rakshit, Paul Taylor, Sameera Waththage and Sudesh Wickramasekara (Cze) all made their T20I debuts.
- Czech Republic played their first men's T20I match.

30 August 2019
12:15
Scorecard

Luxembourg; 127 (17.4 overs)	v	Romania; 129/3 (15.3 overs)
Vikram Vijh 64* (61); Ramesh Satheesan 3/16 (4 overs)		Ijaz Hussain 40 (25); Marcus Cope 2/23 (3 overs)

Romania won by 7 wickets
Moara Vlasiei Cricket Ground, Ilfov County
Umpires: Mark Jameson (Ger) and Thomas Kentorp (Den)

- Luxembourg won the toss and elected to bat.
- James Barker, Marcus Cope and Mohit Dixit (Lux) all made their T20I debuts.

30 August 2019
15:30
Scorecard

Czech Republic; 278/4 (20 overs)	v	Turkey; 21 (8.3 overs)
Sudesh Wickramasekara 104* (36); Mehmat Sert 2/38 (4 overs)		Mehmat Sert 12 (11); Sameera Waththage 3/4 (3 overs)

Czech Republic won by 257 runs
Moara Vlasiei Cricket Ground, Ilfov County
Umpires: Andrew Begg (Rom) and Mark Jameson (Ger)

- Czech Republic won the toss and elected to bat.
- Shaun Dalton (Cze) made his T20I debut.
- Sudesh Wickramasekara became the first batsman for Czech Republic to score a century in T20Is and he equalled the fastest T20I century (35 balls).
- Czech Republic's score was the equal highest total in Twenty20 International cricket.
- Turkey's innings saw eight batsman dismissed for a duck, a record for a T20I match.
- Turkey's score was the lowest team total in a completed T20I match, beating their record of 28 runs set the previous day.
- This was the highest margin of victory by runs in a T20I.

31 August 2019
09:00
Scorecard

Austria; 239/3 (20 overs)	v	Luxembourg; 104/8 (20 overs)
Razmal Shigiwal 53 (21); Suhail Sadiq 1/32 (3 overs)		Mohit Dixit 38 (45); Abdullah Akbarjan 3/20 (4 overs)

Austria won by 135 runs
Moara Vlasiei Cricket Ground, Ilfov County
Umpires: Mark Jameson (Ger) and Thomas Kentorp (Den)

- Austria won the toss and elected to bat.
- Zeshan Arif (Aut) made his T20I debut.

31 August 2019
12:15
Scorecard

Romania; 115/9 (20 overs)	v	Czech Republic; 116/4 (17.1 overs)
Gohar Manan 29 (20); Paul Taylor 4/28 (4 overs)		Honey Gori 46 (32); Rajesh Kumar 2/38 (4 overs)

Czech Republic won by 6 wickets
Moara Vlasiei Cricket Ground, Ilfov County
Umpires: Mark Jameson (Ger) and Thomas Kentorp (Den)

- Czech Republic won the toss and elected to field.

31 August 2019
15:30
Scorecard

Turkey; 32 (8.5 overs)	v	Austria; 33/0 (2.4 overs)
Mehmat Sert 9* (12); Zeshan Arif 4/10 (2.5 overs)		Arsalan Arif 26* (11)

Austria won by 10 wickets
Moara Vlasiei Cricket Ground, Ilfov County
Umpires: Andrew Begg (Rom) and Thomas Kentorp (Den)

- Turkey won the toss and elected to bat.
- Arsalan Arif (Aut) made his T20I debut.
- This was the highest margin of victory in T20I in terms of balls remaining, beating the record set by Luxembourg earlier in the tournament.

1 September 2019
09:30
Scorecard

Luxembourg; 145/5 (20 overs)	v	Czech Republic; 148/4 (15.5 overs)
Girish Venkateswaran 59 (44); Paul Taylor 2/27 (4 overs)		Honey Gori 66 (37); Ankush Nanda 2/5 (0.5 overs)

Czech Republic won by 6 wickets
Moara Vlasiei Cricket Ground, Ilfov County
Umpires: Mark Jameson (Ger) and Thomas Kentorp (Den)

- Czech Republic won the toss and elected to field.

== Final ==
1 September 2019
13:00
Scorecard

Austria; 193/4 (20 overs)	v	Czech Republic; 163 (18.5 overs)
Bilal Zalmai 111* (58); Sameera Waththage 1/22 (3 overs)		Kushalkumar Mendon 40* (26); Anthony Lark 3/20 (3.5 overs)

Austria won by 30 runs
Moara Vlasiei Cricket Ground, Ilfov County
Umpires: Mark Jameson (Ger) and Thomas Kentorp (Den)

- Czech Republic won the toss and elected to field.
- Bilal Zalmai became the first batsman for Austria to score a century in T20Is.
