= Pavel Florin =

Romanian cricketer

Personal information
- Born: 12 February 1979 (age 47); Cluj, Transylvania, Romania
- Batting: Right-handed
- Bowling: Right-arm off break

International information
- National side: Romania
- T20I debut (cap 1): 29 August 2019 v Austria
- Last T20I: 5 September 2021 v Luxembourg

Career statistics
Competition	T20I
Matches	16
Runs scored	26
Batting average	8.66
100s/50s	0
Top score	14
Balls bowled	141
Wickets	15
Bowling average	12.13
5 wickets in innings	0
10 wickets in match	0
Best bowling	3/14
Catches/stumpings	1/–
- Source: Cricinfo, 18 October 2021

Pavel Florin (born 12 February 1979) is a Romanian international cricketer who plays for the national cricket team as a bowler. Florin became well known while playing in the European Cricket League in 2019, when a video showing his bowling action went viral on social media.

== Career and reaction ==
In July 2019 Florin, who took up cricket at 32, bowled the penultimate over for Cluj in an ECL match against Dreux, and conceded 13 runs. The video of the over received widespread attention on social media. Some people mocked Florin's bowling action, others though praised him, with former Australian bowler Shane Warne even offering to help Florin in future and England bowler Jofra Archer offering his respect to him.

Florin, who found out about his sudden fame over lunch, then did an interview, during which he admitted "Maybe someone says my bowling is not beautiful or not effective, but I don't care, because I love cricket." Soon afterwards, he was invited to play cricket in Australia but was denied a visa. The visa denial was soon overturned and he turned out for Surrey Hills Cricket Club. Interest in Florin continued as he took wickets in Australia. Florin was then invited to the Lord's Presidents box, from which he rang the Lord's bell.

Florin has also played in 13 Twenty20 Internationals for Romania, taking 13 wickets and scoring 24 runs. In June 2021, he was named in Romania's squad for the 2021 Sofia Twenty20. Romania won the tournament, and Florin was the joint highest wicket-taker alongside his teammate Sami Ullah.

In July 2021 Florin once again made headlines, when, after taking a wicket in a T10 game in the European Cricket League, he ran to the commentary box to celebrate before shouting his team's name into a microphone.

In early December 2022, Florin signed a 2-game ambassador deal with Big Bash League team, the Melbourne Stars.

== Personal life ==
Aside from playing cricket, Florin works as a bodyguard.
