= Romania national cricket team =

Romania
- Association: Cricket Romania

Personnel
- Captain: Vasu Saini
- Coach: Hitshu Bachani

International Cricket Council
- ICC status: Associate member (2017)
- ICC region: Europe
ICC Rankings	Current	Best-ever
T20I	54th	37th (2 May 2022)

International cricket
- First international: v Bulgaria at Berceni cricket ground, Bucharest, 27 June 2009

T20 Internationals
- First T20I: v Austria at Moara Vlasiei Cricket Ground, Moara Vlăsiei; 29 August 2019
- Last T20I: v France at Moara Vlasei Cricket Ground, Ilfov County; 30 July 2026
T20Is	Played	Won/Lost
Total	81	51/29 (0 ties, 1 no result)
This year	19	13/6 (0 ties, 0 no results)
T20I kit
- As of 30 July 2026

The Romania national cricket team represents the country of Romania in international cricket. Cricket was played in Romania between 1893 and 1930. In recent years the game has begun to grow again, particularly in Bucharest, Timișoara and Cluj-Napoca. In July 2010, they played in a European Twenty20 tournament which was held in Skopje, Macedonia. On 29 June 2013, Romania was granted affiliate status by the International Cricket Council (ICC) and are therefore entitled to participate in ICC official events. In 2017, they became an associate member.

As in a number of European countries, the game is dominated by expatriates from traditional cricket-playing nations in the Indian subcontinent and the Commonwealth of Nations. The main groundof the team for national and international matches is at Moara Vlăsiei, 26 km (16 miles) away from the Bucharest city centre. It was built between 2011 and 2013 and is the only turf cricket ground in Central and Eastern Europe.

Romania won the 2021 Sofia Twenty20 cup, where they defeated Bulgaria in the final. They have been gaining prominence in the European cricket scene, with their performances improving in recent seasons.

== History ==
=== 2018-Present ===
In April 2018, the ICC decided to grant full Twenty20 International (T20I) status to all its members. Therefore, all Twenty20 matches played between Romania and other ICC members after 1 January 2019 will be a full T20I.

Romania played its first T20I match against Austria on 29 August 2019 during the 2019 Continental Cup in Romania.

29 August 2019
09:00
Scorecard

Romania; 137/7 (20 overs)	v	Austria; 106 (19.4 overs)
Ijaz Hussain 35 (36); Bilal Zalmai 4/12 (4 overs)		Anthony Lark 30 (41); Ramesh Satheesan 3/14 (4 overs)

Romania won by 31 runs
Moara Vlasiei Cricket Ground, Ilfov County
Umpires: Mark Jameson (Ger) and Thomas Kentorp (Den)

- Austria won the toss and elected to field.
- First ever T20I match for Romania.

Romania are scheduled to make their debut in an ICC event, when they take part in the Europe Qualifier tournament in 2021.

== International grounds ==
Locations of stadiums which have hosted international cricket matches within Romania

== Tournament history ==
=== Sofia Twenty20 ===
- 2021: Champions
- 2022: Did not enter

=== Continental Cup ===
- 2019: 3rd place
- 2021: Champions
- 2023: Champions

=== Valletta Cup ===
- 2019: Did not enter
- 2021: Did not enter
- 2022: Champions
- 2023: 4th

== Current squad ==
This lists all the players who have played for Romania in the past 12 months or has been part of the latest T20I squad.

Name	Age	Batting style	Bowling style	Notes
Batters
Sivakumar Periyalwar	38	Right-handed	Right-arm medium	
Ramesh Satheesan	44	Right-handed	Right-arm off break	Captain
Anand Rajshekara	37	Right-handed	Right-arm off break	
Luca Petre	19	Right-handed	Right-arm medium	
Rameez Khan	33	Right-handed	Right-arm medium	
All-rounders
Vasu Saini	36	Right-handed	Right-arm medium	Vice-captain
Taranjeet Singh	40	Right-handed	Right-arm off break	
Muhammad Moiz	38	Right-handed	Right-arm medium	
Adrian Lascu	27	Right-handed	Right-arm medium	
Cosmin Zavoiu	47	Right-handed	Right-arm medium	
Wicket-keeper
Satvik Nadigotla	37	Right-handed		
Spin Bowlers
Pratham Hingorani	26	Right-handed	Right-arm leg break	
Ali Hussain	33	Left-handed	Slow left-arm orthodox	
Pace Bowlers
Manmeet Koli	29	Right-handed	Right-arm medium-fast	
Shantanu Vashisht	37	Right-handed	Right-arm medium-fast	
Ravindra Athapaththu	37	Right-handed	Right-arm medium	

Updated as on 16 June 2024

== Records ==
International Match Summary — Romania

Last updated 30 July 2026.

Playing Record
Format	M	W	L	T	NR	Inaugural Match
Twenty20 Internationals	81	51	29	0	1	31 August 2019

=== Twenty20 International ===
- Highest team total: 226/6 v. Turkey, 29 August 2019 at Moara Vlasiei Cricket Ground, Moara Vlăsiei
- Highest individual score: 110, Taranjeet Singh v. Czech Republic, 13 May 2022 at Marsa Sports Club, Marsa
- Best individual bowling figures: 5/30, Asif Bevinje v. Hungary, 3 September 2021 at Moara Vlasiei Cricket Ground, Moara Vlăsiei

Most T20I runs for Romania

Player	Runs	Average	Career span
Taranjeet Singh	1,699	34.67	2021–2026
Ramesh Satheesan	1,623	33.12	2019–2026
Vasu Saini	1,475	31.38	2019–2026
Sivakumar Periyalwar	570	23.75	2019–2025
Avishka Iroshan	595	28.33	2025–2026

Most T20I wickets for Romania

Player	Wickets	Average	Career span
Manmeet Koli	62	20.27	2022–2026
Vasu Saini	53	27.20	2020–2026
Taranjeet Singh	52	19.30	2021–2026
Ijaz Hussain	39	17.28	2019–2026
Irfan Ringku	32	12.00	2026–2026

T20I record versus other nations

Records complete to T20I #4054. Last updated 30 July 2026.

Opponent	M	W	L	T	NR	First match	First win
vs Associate Members
Austria	11	5	5	0	1	29 August 2019	29 August 2019
Belgium	4	1	3	0	0	29 June 2025	12 July 2026
Bulgaria	13	12	1	0	0	16 October 2020	17 October 2020
Cyprus	1	0	1	0	0	13 July 2022	
Czech Republic	7	4	3	0	0	31 August 2019	3 September 2021
Denmark	1	0	1	0	0	14 July 2026	
France	3	1	2	0	0	13 July 2023	25 July 2026
Gibraltar	3	2	1	0	0	14 May 2022	14 May 2022
Greece	1	1	0	0	0	24 June 2021	24 June 2021
Hungary	6	5	1	0	0	3 September 2021	3 September 2021
Isle of Man	1	0	1	0	0	15 July 2022	
Israel	2	2	0	0	0	15 June 2024	15 June 2024
Italy	1	0	1	0	0	16 June 2024	
Luxembourg	5	4	1	0	0	30 August 2019	30 August 2019
Malta	10	5	5	0	0	4 September 2021	4 September 2021
Portugal	1	1	0	0	0	10 June 2024	10 June 2024
Serbia	4	4	0	0	0	25 June 2021	25 June 2021
Sweden	1	0	1	0	0	19 July 2022	
Switzerland	3	1	2	0	0	13 July 2023	21 June 2026
Turkey	3	3	0	0	0	29 August 2019	29 August 2019

== See also ==
- List of Romania Twenty20 International cricketers
- Romania women's national cricket team
