= National Sports Academy "Vasil Levski" =

Public university in Sofia, Bulgaria

LEVSKI Academy
- Национална Спортна Академия "Васил Левски"
- Type: Public
- Established: 1942
- Affiliations: EUA
- Rector: prof. Pencho Geshev
- Students: 10,000+
- Location: Sofia, Bulgaria
- Campus: Urban
- Colours: White
- Website: www.nsa.bg/en

The Vassil Levski National Sports Academy (Bulgarian: Национална Спортна Академия "Васил Левски"), commonly referred to as the NSA, is Bulgaria's premiere higher education institution specializing in teaching physical education. It is named after national hero Vasil Levski.

== History ==
The academy was established in 1942 by a decree of Tsar Boris III as the Higher School for Physical Education (Висше Уилище за Телесно Възпитание). It was named Higher Institute for Physical Education and Sport (Висш Институт за Физическо Възпитание и Спорт) from 1953 to 1995. In 1995, by decision of the National Assembly, the VIF was renamed the National Sports Academy. Discover a new, modernly-equipped educational building in the Student Town of Darvenica. A high-mountain training base at the Vitosha National Academy was created during that time.

== Academics ==
The university offers bachelor's, master's, and doctoral degrees in a wide variety of sports-related disciplines. Curricula are distributed among three faculties:

- Faculty of Coaching
- Faculty of Physical Education
- Faculty of Kinesiotherapy, Tourism, and Sports Animation

== Careers ==
The alumni of the National Sports Academy have found professional realization as:

- Coaches of club or national teams, as well as trainers in youth sports academies;
- Teachers and lecturers in physical education and sports at kindergartens, schools, and universities;
- Kinesitherapists or physiotherapists in hospitals, sanatoriums, and rehabilitation centers;
- Instructors in fitness and SPA centers;
- Sport Animators in sports and leisure centers;
- Trainers of people with disabilities and special educational needs;
- Sports Psychologists of elite athletes and teams;
- Managers of sports clubs, fitness centers, sports facilities, sports federations, and associations;
- Sports journalists and commentators in electronic and print media;
- Specialists in physical and martial applied training in the system of Ministry of Interior and Ministry of Defense.

== Basketball ==
National Sports Academy men's basketball team won Bulgarian Cup in 1964.

== Cricket ==
National Sports Academy
- Interactive map of National Sports Academy

Ground information
- Location: Sofia
- Country: Bulgaria

International information
- First men's T20I: 23 September 2020: Bulgaria v Malta
- Last men's T20I: 25 June 2023: Bulgaria v Serbia
- First women's T20I: 7 July 2025: Greece v Turkey
- Last women's T20I: 9 July 2026: Greece v Turkey

Team information
Bulgaria national cricket team
- As of 9 July 2025; Source: Ground profile

In September 2020, the ground was selected to host the first official T20I matches played in Bulgaria against the visiting Malta cricket team.
