= Twenty20 =

Form of limited overs cricket, 20-over format

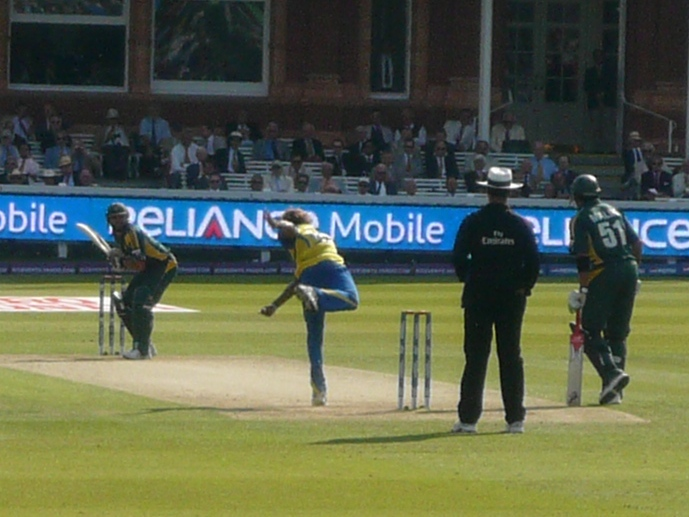
Lasith Malinga bowling to Shahid Afridi in the 2009 World T20 final at Lord's, London

Twenty20 (abbreviated T20) is a shortened format of cricket. At the professional level, it was introduced by the England and Wales Cricket Board (ECB) in 2003 for the inter-county competition. In a Twenty20 game, the two teams have a single innings each, which is restricted to a maximum of twenty overs (which is equivalent to 120 legal deliveries per team). Together with first-class and List A cricket, Twenty20 is one of the three forms of cricket recognised by the International Cricket Council (ICC) as being played at the highest level, both internationally and domestically.

A typical Twenty20 match lasts just over 3 hours, with each innings lasting around 90 minutes and an official 10-minute break between the innings. This is much shorter than previous forms of the game, and is closer to the timespan of other popular team sports. It was introduced to create a fast-paced game that would be attractive to spectators at the ground and viewers on television.

The game has succeeded in spreading around the cricket world. On most international tours there is at least one Twenty20 match – these are known as Twenty20 Internationals – and all test-playing nations have a domestic cup competition.

== History ==
=== Origins ===
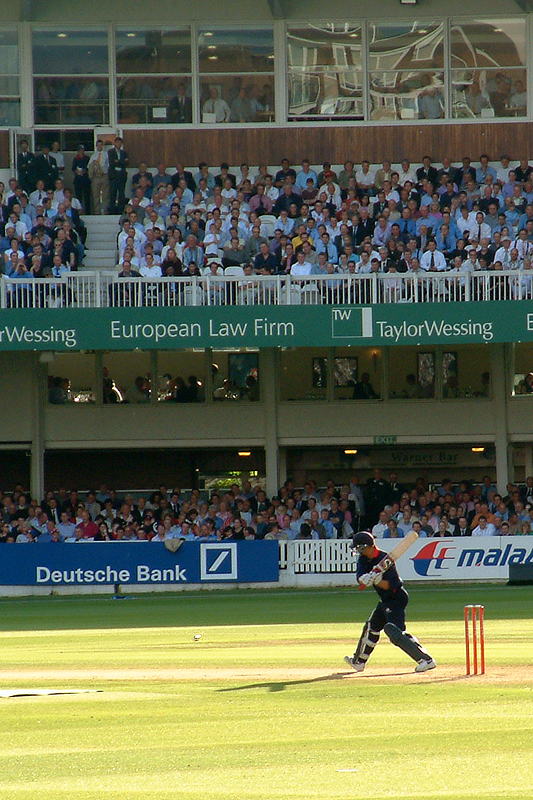
Former England batsman Andrew Strauss batting for Middlesex against Surrey

A few years prior to the introduction of the current T20 match format, a different form of 20 overs per side cricket known as Cricket Max was played both domestically and on an unofficial home international basis in New Zealand from 1996 to 2003. The format differed from current Twenty20 cricket as each team had two separate innings of 10 overs each, and a number of other rules innovations. The only one that would be utilised in Twenty20 cricket (as well as other limited-overs cricket) was a free-hit for no-balls.

When the Benson & Hedges Cup ended in 2002 owing, in response to dwindling attendances at longer format matches such as those in the County Championship, the ECB sought another one-day competition to appeal to a younger demographic. The Board wanted to deliver fast-paced, exciting cricket accessible to fans who were put off by the longer versions of the game. Stuart Robertson, (Marketing Manager of the ECB), Kevin Allton (ECB New Media Marketing Manager), Joe Bruce (Sponsorship Manager) and Richard Kaye (Sales Manager) proposed a 20-over-per-innings game, invented by New Zealand cricketer Martin Crowe, to county chairmen in 2001, and they voted 11–7 in favour of adopting the new format.

The first official Twenty20 matches were played on 13 June 2003 between the English counties in the Twenty20 Cup. The first season of Twenty20 in England was a relative success, with the Surrey Lions defeating the Warwickshire Bears by nine wickets in the final to claim the title. The first Twenty20 match held at Lord's, on 15 July 2004 between Middlesex and Surrey, attracted a crowd of 27,509, the highest attendance for any county cricket game at the ground – other than a one-day final – since 1953.

=== Worldwide spread ===
Thirteen teams from many different parts of the country participated in Pakistan's inaugural competition in 2004, with the Faisalabad Wolves the first winners. On 12 January 2005 Australia's first Twenty20 game was played at the WACA Ground between the Western Warriors and the Victorian Bushrangers. It drew a sell-out crowd of 20,000, which was the first one in nearly 25 years.

Starting on 11 July 2006, 19 teams in the West Indies competed in what was named the Stanford 20/20 tournament. The event was financially backed by billionaire Allen Stanford, who gave at least US$28 million in funding money. It was intended that the tournament would be an annual event. Guyana won the inaugural event, defeating Trinidad and Tobago by five wickets, securing US$1 million in prize money.

On 5 January 2007 the Queensland Bulls played the New South Wales Blues at The Gabba, Brisbane. An unexpected 16,000 fans turned up on the day to buy tickets, causing Gabba staff to throw open gates and grant many fans free entry. Attendance reached 27,653. For the February 2008 Twenty20 match between Australia and India, 85,824 people attended the match at the Melbourne Cricket Ground, involving the Twenty20 World Champions against the ODI World Champions.

The Stanford Super Series was held in October 2008 between the three teams. The respective winners of the English and Caribbean Twenty20 competitions, Middlesex and Trinidad and Tobago, and a Stanford Superstars team formed from West Indies domestic players. Trinidad and Tobago won the competition, securing US$280,000 prize money. On 1 November, the Stanford Superstars played England in what was expected to be the first of five fixtures in as many years with the winner claiming US$20 million in each match. The Stanford Superstars won the first match, but no further fixtures were held as Allen Stanford was charged with fraud in 2009.

=== T20 leagues ===
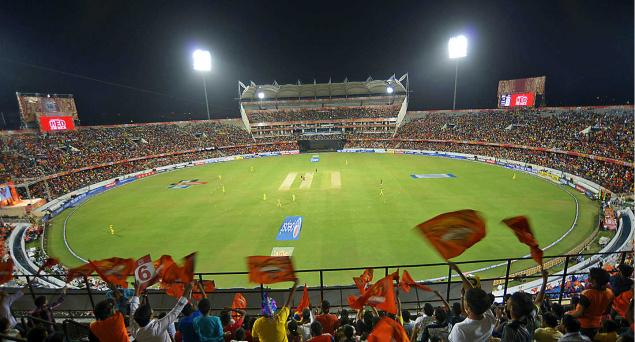
Crowd during a match of the 2015 IPL season in Hyderabad, India

Several T20 leagues started after the popularity of the 2007 ICC World Twenty20. The Board of Control for Cricket in India started the Indian Premier League popularly known as IPL, which is now the largest cricket league, in 2008, which utilizes the North American sports franchise system with ten teams in major Indian cities. In September 2017, the broadcasting and digital rights for the next five years (2018–2022) of the IPL were sold to Star India for US$2.55 billion, making it one of the world's most lucrative sports league per match. The IPL has seen a spike in its brand valuation to US$5.3 billion after the 10th edition, according to global valuation and corporate finance advisor Duff & Phelps.

The Big Bash League, Bangladesh Premier League, Pakistan Super League, Caribbean Premier League, and Afghanistan Premier League started thereafter, following similar formulae, and remained popular with the fans. The Women's Big Bash League was started in 2015 by Cricket Australia, while the Kia Super League was started in England and Wales in 2016. The Mzansi Super League in South Africa was started in 2018. Global Cricket League was started in 2026 by USA cricket to promote cricket nationwide.

Several T20 leagues follow the general format of having a group stage followed by a Page playoff system among the top four teams where:

- The first- and second-highest placed teams in the group stage face off, with the winner going to the final.
- The third- and fourth-place teams face off, with the loser being eliminated.
- The two teams who have not yet made it to the final after the above two matches have been played face off to fill the second berth in the final.

In the Big Bash League, there was an additional match to determine which of the fourth- or fifth-placed teams will qualify to be in the top four, Until the 2022/23 season.

=== Twenty20 Internationals ===
The first Twenty20 International match was held on 5 August 2004 between the England and New Zealand women's teams, with New Zealand winning by nine runs.

On 17 February 2005 Australia defeated New Zealand in the first men's international Twenty20 match, played at Eden Park in Auckland. The game was played in a light-hearted manner – both sides turned out in kit similar to that worn in the 1980s, the New Zealand team's a direct copy of that worn by the Beige Brigade. Some of the players also sported moustaches or beards and hairstyles popular in the 1980s, taking part in a competition amongst themselves for "best retro look", at the request of the Beige Brigade. Australia won the game comprehensively, and as the result became obvious towards the end of the NZ innings, the players and umpires took things less seriously: Glenn McGrath jokingly replayed the Trevor Chappell underarm incident from a 1981 ODI between the two sides, and Billy Bowden showed him a mock red card (red cards are not normally used in cricket) in response.

On 16 February 2006 New Zealand defeated West Indies in a tie-breaking bowl-out 3–0; 126 runs were scored apiece in the game proper.

The ICC has declared that it sees T20 as the optimal format for globalizing the game, and in 2018, announced that it will give international status to all T20 cricket matches played between its member nations. This resulted in a significant leap in the number of T20I matches played across the world.

==== Twenty20 World Cup ====
Every two years an ICC World Twenty20 tournament is to take place, except in the event of an ICC Cricket World Cup being scheduled in the same year, in which case it will be held the year before. The first tournament was in 2007 in South Africa where India defeated Pakistan in the final. Two Associate teams had played in the first tournament, selected through the 2007 ICC World Cricket League Division One, a 50-over competition. In December 2007 it was decided to hold a qualifying tournament with a 20-over format to better prepare the teams. With six participants, two would qualify for the 2009 World Twenty20 and would each receive $250,000 in prize money. The second tournament was won by Pakistan, who beat Sri Lanka by eight wickets in England on 21 June 2009. The 2010 ICC World Twenty20 tournament was held in the West Indies in May 2010, where England defeated Australia by seven wickets. The 2012 ICC World Twenty20 was won by the West Indies, by defeating Sri Lanka at the finals. It was the first time in cricket history when a T20 World Cup tournament took place in an Asian country. The 2014 ICC World Twenty20 was won by Sri Lanka, by defeating India at the finals, where the tournament was held in Bangladesh. The 2016 ICC World Twenty20 was won by West Indies. In July 2020, the ICC announced that both the 2020 and 2021 editions had been postponed by one year due to the COVID-19 pandemic.

Starting 2024, the ICC expanded the Twenty20 World Cup from 16 to 20 teams.

India won the 2024 T20 WC, which marked the last T20 campaign for Virat Kohli and Rohit Sharma. In the 2026 Men's T20 World Cup, India defeated New Zealand in the final, thus becoming the only team to win back-to-back T20 World Cups (2024 and 2026), and a record three titles in the T20 World Cup.

=== Impact on the game ===
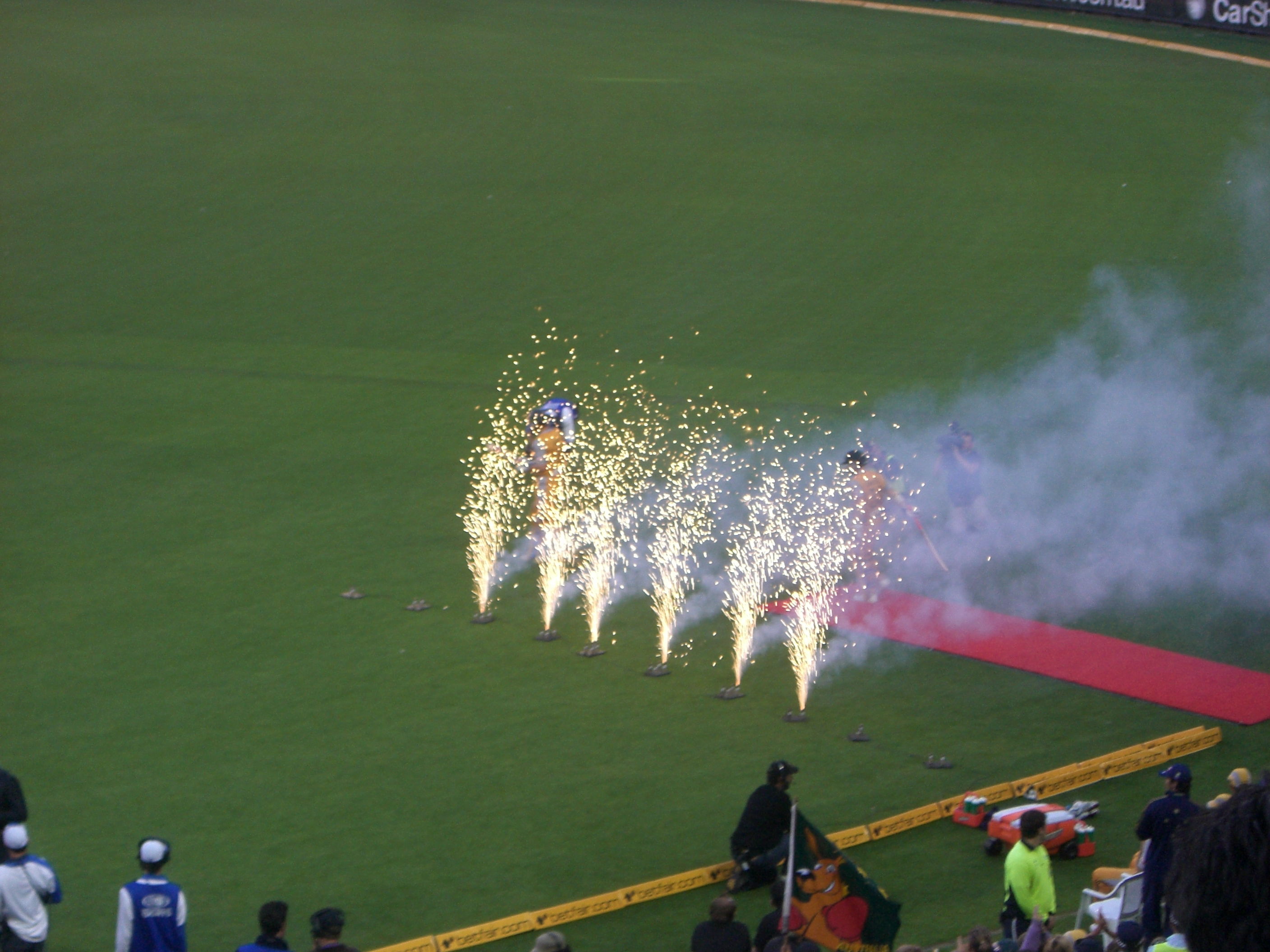
Twenty20 matches can have some exciting displays, such as when the batsmen run out to the pitch

Twenty20 cricket is claimed to have resulted in a more athletic and explosive form of cricket. Indian fitness coach Ramji Srinivasan declared in an interview with the Indian fitness website Takath.com that Twenty20 had "raised the bar" in terms of fitness levels for all players, demanding higher levels of strength, speed, agility and reaction time from all players regardless of role in the team. Matthew Hayden credited retirement from international cricket with aiding his performance in general and fitness in particular in the Indian Premier League.

Several commentators have noted that the T20 format has been embraced by many Associate Members of the ICC partly because it is more financially viable to play. T20's success has also inspired the invention of even shorter formats, such as T10 cricket and 100-ball cricket, and its impact on cricket has been compared to or served as inspiration for innovations in other sports, such as with the 3x3 variant of basketball or the Indian Pro Kabaddi League.

Former Australian captain Ricky Ponting, on the other hand, has criticised Twenty20 as being detrimental to Test cricket and for hampering batsmen's scoring skills and concentration. Former Australian captain Greg Chappell made similar complaints, fearing that young players would play too much T20 and not develop their batting skills fully, while former England player Alex Tudor feared the same for bowling skills.

Former West Indies captains Clive Lloyd, Michael Holding and Garfield Sobers criticised Twenty20 for its role in discouraging players from representing their national Test team, with many West Indies players like Chris Gayle, Sunil Narine, Jason Holder and Dwayne Bravo preferring to play in Twenty20 franchises elsewhere in the world and earn more money. Similar, New Zealand players Trent Boult and Jimmy Neesham turned down central contracts enabling them to play cricket for New Zealand, instead preferring to concentrate on Twenty20 franchise cricket. English commentators Geoffrey Boycott and Jonathan Agnew have both expressed dissatisfaction with the format and its effects on longer-form cricket.

Under-17s and Under-19s are playing T20 games in national championships, and at the detriment of two-day games. Good state players these days are averaging 35; if you were averaging 35 when I was playing your dad would go and buy you a basketball or a footy and tell you to play that.

— Ricky Ponting,

=== Inclusion in multi-sport events ===
In June 2009, speaking at the annual Cowdrey Lecture at Lord's, former Australian wicketkeeper Adam Gilchrist pushed for Twenty20 to be made an Olympic sport. "It would," he said, "be difficult to see a better, quicker or cheaper way of spreading the game throughout the world." This became a reality starting with the 2028 Summer Olympics. T20 cricket has also been accepted into the Asian Games and Commonwealth Games.

== Match format and rules ==
=== Format ===
Twenty20 match format is a form of limited overs cricket in that it involves two teams, each with a single innings. The key feature is that each team bats for a maximum of 20 overs (120 legal balls). The batting team members do not arrive from and depart to traditional dressing rooms, but come and go from a bench (typically a row of chairs) visible in the playing arena, analogous to association football's technical area or a baseball dugout.

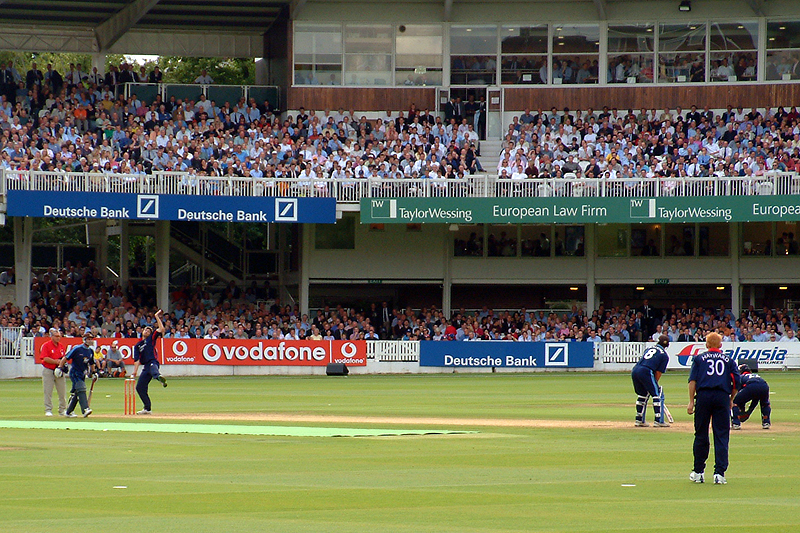
Middlesex playing against Surrey at Lord's, in front of a 28,000-strong crowd

=== General rules ===
The Laws of Cricket apply to Twenty20, with some variations depending on the exact competition rules. The most common include:

- Each bowler may bowl a maximum of only one-fifth of the total overs per innings. For a full, uninterrupted match, this is four overs.
- If a bowler delivers a no-ball by overstepping the crease, it costs one or two runs (depending on the competition) and their next delivery is designated a "free hit". In this circumstance the batter can only be dismissed through a run out, hitting the ball twice or obstructing the field.
- The following fielding restrictions apply:
  - No more than five fielders can be on the leg side at any time.
  - During the first six overs, a maximum of two fielders can be outside the 30-yard circle (this is known as the powerplay).
  - After the first six overs, a maximum of five fielders can be outside the fielding circle.
    - However, in Australia's Big Bash League the Powerplay is only the first 4 overs, with the batters choosing when the same restrictions apply for 2 overs in the second half of the innings, in a period called a Powersurge.

=== Tie deciders ===
Currently, if the match ends with the scores tied and there must be a winner, the tie is broken with a one-over-per-side Eliminator or Super Over: Each team nominates three batsmen and one bowler to play a one-over-per-side "mini-match". The team which bats second in the match bats first in the Super Over. In turn, each side bats one over bowled by the one nominated opposition bowler, with their innings over if they lose two wickets before the over is completed. The side with the higher score from their Super Over wins. If the Super Over also ends up in a tie, it is repeated until the tie is broken.

In the Australian domestic competition the Big Bash League, the Super Over is played slightly differently, with no two-wicket limit, and if the Super Over is also tied then a "countback" is used, with scores after the fifth ball for each team being used to determine the result. If it is still tied, then the countback goes to four balls, and so on. The latest Super Over to decide a match was between the United States and Pakistan on 6 June 2024, in the 2024 ICC Men's T20 World Cup at Grand Prairie Stadium in Dallas, Texas, with the United States winning 18/1 to 13/1 in the Super Over after tying on 159.

Tied Twenty20 matches were previously decided by a bowl-out until 2008.

== International ==
Women's and men's Twenty20 Internationals have been played since 2004 and 2005 respectively. To date, 76 nations have played the format, including all Test-playing nations.

Nation	Date of men's T20I debut	Date of women's T20I debut
Australia	17 February 2005	2 September 2005
New Zealand	17 February 2005	5 August 2004
England	13 June 2005	5 August 2004
South Africa	21 October 2005	10 August 2007
West Indies	16 February 2006	27 June 2008
Sri Lanka	15 June 2006	12 June 2009
Pakistan	28 August 2006	25 May 2009
Bangladesh	28 November 2006	27 August 2012
Zimbabwe	28 November 2006	5 January 2019
India	1 December 2006	5 August 2006
Kenya	1 September 2007	6 April 2019
Scotland	12 September 2007	7 July 2018
Netherlands	2 August 2008	27 June 2008
Ireland	2 August 2008	27 June 2008
Canada	2 August 2008	17 May 2019
Bermuda	3 August 2008	
Afghanistan	2 February 2010	
Nepal	16 March 2014	12 January 2019
Hong Kong	16 March 2014	12 January 2019
United Arab Emirates	17 March 2014	7 July 2018
Papua New Guinea	15 July 2015	7 July 2018
Oman	25 July 2015	17 January 2020
Sierra Leone	19 October 2021	20 August 2018
Lesotho	16 October 2021	20 August 2018
South Korea	9 October 2022	3 November 2018
China	26 July 2023	3 November 2018
Indonesia	9 October 2022	12 January 2019
Myanmar	26 July 2023	12 January 2019
Bhutan	5 December 2019	13 January 2019
Bahrain	20 January 2019	20 March 2022
Saudi Arabia	20 January 2019	20 March 2022
Kuwait	20 January 2019	18 February 2019
Maldives	20 January 2019	2 December 2019
Qatar	21 January 2019	17 January 2020
Rwanda	18 August 2021	26 January 2019
United States	15 March 2019	17 May 2019
Philippines	22 March 2019	21 December 2019
Vanuatu	22 March 2019	6 May 2019
Spain	29 March 2019	5 May 2022
Malta	29 March 2019	27 August 2022
Mexico	25 April 2019	23 August 2018
Belize	25 April 2019	13 December 2019
Costa Rica	25 April 2019	26 April 2019
Panama	25 April 2019	
Japan	9 October 2022	6 May 2019
Fiji	9 September 2022	6 May 2019
Tanzania	2 November 2021	6 May 2019
Belgium	11 May 2019	25 September 2021
Germany	11 May 2019	26 June 2019
Uganda	20 May 2019	7 July 2018
Nigeria	20 May 2019	26 January 2019
Ghana	20 May 2019	28 March 2022
Namibia	20 May 2019	20 August 2018
Botswana	20 May 2019	20 August 2018
Italy	25 May 2019	9 August 2021
Guernsey	31 May 2019	31 May 2019
Jersey	31 May 2019	31 May 2019
Norway	15 June 2019	31 July 2019
Denmark	16 June 2019	28 May 2022
Mali	17 November 2021	18 June 2019
Malaysia	24 June 2019	3 June 2018
Thailand	24 June 2019	3 June 2018
Samoa	8 July 2019	6 May 2019
Finland	13 July 2019	
Singapore	22 July 2019	9 August 2018
France	5 August 2021	31 July 2019
Cayman Islands	18 August 2019	26 September 2024
Austria	29 August 2019	31 July 2019
Romania	29 August 2019	27 August 2022
Luxembourg	29 August 2019	
Turkey	29 August 2019	29 May 2023
Czech Republic	30 August 2019	
Argentina	3 October 2019	3 October 2019
Brazil	3 October 2019	23 August 2018
Chile	3 October 2019	23 August 2018
Peru	3 October 2019	3 October 2019
Bulgaria	14 October 2019	
Serbia	14 October 2019	10 September 2022
Greece	15 October 2019	9 September 2022
Portugal	25 October 2019	
Gibraltar	26 October 2019	
Malawi	6 November 2019	20 August 2018
Mozambique	6 November 2019	20 August 2018
Timor-Leste	6 November 2025	

=== T20 International rankings ===
In November 2011, the ICC released the first Twenty20 International rankings for the men's game, based on the same system as the Test and ODI rankings. The rankings cover a two- to three-year period, with matches since the most recent 1 August weighted fully, matches in the preceding 12 months weighted two-thirds, and matches in the 12 months preceding that weighted one-third. To qualify for the rankings, teams must have played at least eight Twenty20 Internationals in the ranking period.

The ICC Women's Rankings were launched in October 2015, which aggregated performance over all three forms of the game. In October 2018, the ICC announced that the women's ranking would be split between ODIs and T20Is, and released both tables shortly thereafter.

ICC Men's T20I Team Rankings
Team	Matches	Points	Rating
England	41	11,021	269
India	76	20,268	267
Australia	38	9,868	260
New Zealand	55	13,638	248
South Africa	53	12,881	243
Pakistan	62	14,883	241
West Indies	60	14,155	236
Bangladesh	55	12,220	222
Sri Lanka	52	11,489	221
Afghanistan	44	9,679	220
Ireland	29	5,942	205
Zimbabwe	62	12,417	200
United States	20	3,650	183
Nepal	44	7,968	181
Netherlands	24	4,311	180
Namibia	41	7,358	179
Scotland	23	4,116	179
United Arab Emirates	57	9,961	175
Oman	44	6,698	152
Canada	26	3,864	149
Uganda	52	7,331	141
Papua New Guinea	20	2,743	137
Italy	15	1,988	133
Hong Kong	55	7,154	130
Malaysia	59	7,409	126
Kuwait	35	4,360	125
Spain	16	1,961	123
Qatar	41	4,925	120
Jersey	21	2,484	118
Bahrain	71	8,393	118
Saudi Arabia	31	3,551	115
Bermuda	24	2,713	113
Kenya	50	5,434	109
Tanzania	30	2,967	99
Portugal	28	2,525	90
Guernsey	24	2,028	85
Denmark	20	1,682	84
Germany	30	2,488	83
Cayman Islands	28	2,295	82
Nigeria	52	4,187	81
Japan	40	2,931	73
Singapore	36	2,555	71
Austria	66	4,293	65
Sweden	36	2,151	60
Belgium	33	1,923	58
Finland	29	1,623	56
Norway	36	2,006	56
Argentina	14	728	54
France	35	1,753	50
Romania	43	2,134	50
Switzerland	26	1,260	48
Cook Islands	14	649	46
Rwanda	72	3,264	45
Botswana	40	1,778	44
Samoa	21	933	44
Malawi	41	1,807	44
Isle of Man	12	511	43
Philippines	29	1,191	41
Thailand	41	1,635	40
Cambodia	29	1,435	38
Bahamas	20	762	38
Cyprus	26	892	34
Czech Republic	21	716	34
Malta	39	1,326	34
Indonesia	87	2,943	34
Vanuatu	15	491	33
Eswatini	22	713	32
Zambia	21	677	32
South Korea	21	636	30
Ghana	19	571	30
Hungary	35	1,014	29
Panama	15	371	25
Estonia	21	513	24
Falkland Islands	9	217	24
Cameroon	10	213	21
Bhutan	32	642	20
Belize	7	139	20
Mexico	25	445	18
Luxembourg	24	410	17
Brazil	21	353	17
Gibraltar	25	412	16
Mozambique	22	347	16
Israel	12	160	13
Sierra Leone	38	452	12
Maldives	17	167	10
Suriname	10	82	8
Bulgaria	25	202	8
Gambia	8	57	7
Croatia	24	169	7
Seychelles	7	46	7
Serbia	27	112	4
Lesotho	21	80	4
Turkey	17	63	4
Fiji	9	19	2
Myanmar	29	50	2
Costa Rica	18	14	1
Timor-Leste	8	0	0
Ivory Coast	9	0	0
Mongolia	12	0	0
Saint Helena	7	0	0
Slovenia	17	0	0
Mali	10	0	0
Greece	6	0	0
China	13	0	0
Source: ICC Men's T20I Team Rankings, 17 November 2026 See points calculations for more details.

ICC Women's T20I Team Rankings
Team	Matches	Points	Rating
Australia	30	8,753	292
England	38	10,504	276
India	52	13,779	265
New Zealand	34	8,444	248
South Africa	43	10,588	246
Sri Lanka	47	11,203	238
West Indies	36	8,572	238
Pakistan	43	9,142	213
Ireland	44	8,921	203
Bangladesh	45	8,737	194
Scotland	40	6,723	168
Thailand	67	10,193	152
Papua New Guinea	33	4,660	141
Netherlands	50	7,058	141
United Arab Emirates	50	6,831	137
Zimbabwe	47	5,617	120
Uganda	61	6,739	112
Namibia	53	5,675	107
Tanzania	38	3,607	95
United States	35	3,316	95
Nepal	51	4,673	92
Hong Kong	63	5,634	89
Indonesia	44	3,922	89
Rwanda	65	5,779	89
Italy	31	2,603	84
Nigeria	36	2,689	75
Brazil	41	2,909	71
Malaysia	54	3,602	67
Vanuatu	27	1,762	65
Germany	33	2,130	65
Kenya	24	1,534	64
Jersey	27	1,639	61
Spain	15	867	58
Sweden	23	1,269	55
Oman	34	1,708	50
China	37	1,842	50
Cyprus	22	1,080	49
Isle of Man	24	1,137	47
Japan	34	1,529	45
Turkey	15	643	43
Switzerland	27	1,146	42
Canada	20	841	42
Myanmar	32	1,344	42
Denmark	29	1,194	41
Argentina	21	855	41
Costa Rica	7	267	38
Sierra Leone	26	989	38
Bhutan	21	771	37
France	10	349	35
Botswana	32	1,010	32
Gibraltar	12	378	32
Kuwait	27	842	31
Croatia	10	306	31
Samoa	16	472	30
Austria	30	816	27
Portugal	8	197	25
Guernsey	13	267	21
Norway	23	433	19
Malawi	31	556	18
Fiji	15	263	18
Serbia	19	291	15
Czech Republic	28	403	14
Greece	31	439	14
Estonia	21	283	13
Qatar	24	299	12
Finland	11	136	12
Romania	16	165	10
Mozambique	22	221	10
Malta	15	136	9
Cameroon	18	158	9
Luxembourg	19	157	8
Mexico	7	51	7
Bulgaria	27	114	4
Lesotho	17	50	3
Mongolia	20	42	2
Philippines	22	40	2
Singapore	29	11	0
Eswatini	10	0	0
Saudi Arabia	8	0	0
Cook Islands	12	0	0
Chile	7	0	0
Belgium	15	0	0
Bahrain	24	0	0
Source: ICC Women's T20I Team Rankings, 14 November 2026

== Domestic professional T20 leagues ==
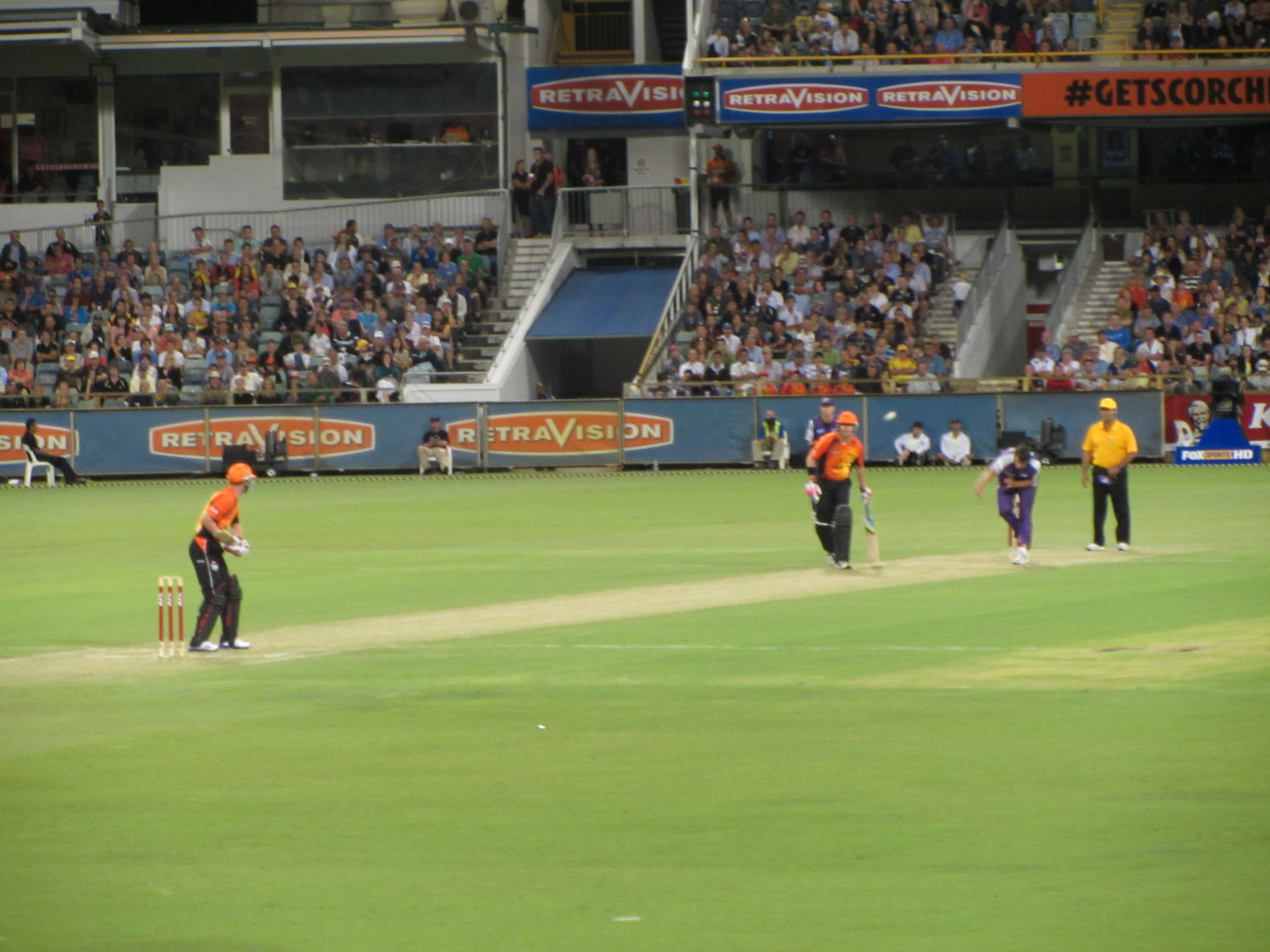
The Perth Scorchers taking on the Hobart Hurricanes at the WACA Ground during Australia's BBL 01 (2011–12).

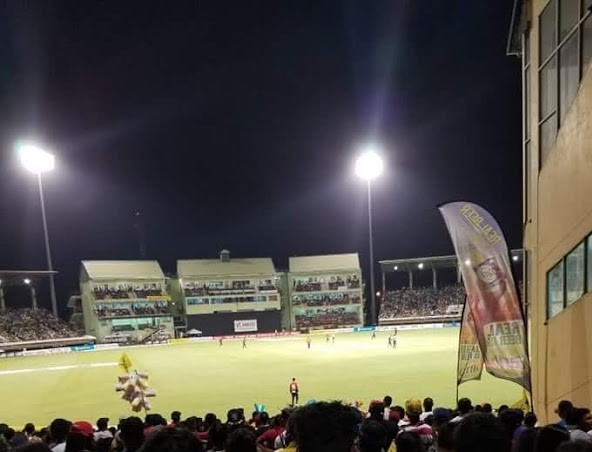
The Guyana Amazon Warriors taking on the Trinbago Knight Riders at the Providence Stadium during West Indies' CPL 06 (2018).

This is a list of the current Twenty20 domestic competitions in several of the leading cricket countries.

Country	Domestic competitions	Est.	Number of teams	Most Successful Team
Australia	Big Bash League	2011	8	Perth Scorchers (6)
Bangladesh	Bangladesh Premier League, National Cricket League Twenty20	2012	6, 8	Comilla Victorians (4)
Canada	Global T20 Canada	2018	6	(1)
England	Vitality Blast	2003	18	Leicestershire Foxes (3)
India	Indian Premier League, Syed Mushtaq Ali Trophy	2008	10, 38	Chennai Super Kings, Mumbai Indians (5), Tamil Nadu (3)
Ireland	Inter-Provincial Trophy	2013	4	Leinster Lightning (9)
Netherlands	Dutch Twenty20 Cup	2007	16	VRA Amsterdam (5)
Nepal	Nepal Premier League	2024	8	Janakpur Bolts, Lumbini Lions (1)
New Zealand	Super Smash	2005	6	Auckland Aces (5)
Pakistan	Pakistan Super League, National T20 Cup, Champions T20 Cup	2016	8, 8, 6	Lahore Qalandars, Islamabad United (3)
Scotland	Murgitroyd Twenty20, Regional Pro Series	2008	3	Carlton Cricket Club (5)
South Africa	SA20, CSA Provincial T20 Cup	2023	6, 15, 6	Sunrisers Eastern Cape (3)
Sri Lanka	Lanka Premier League	2020	5	Jaffna Kings (4)
West Indies	Caribbean Premier League	2013	6	Trinbago Knight Riders (5)
United Arab Emirates	International League T20	2023	6	Gulf Giants, MI Emirates, Dubai Capitals, Desert Vipers (1)
United States	Major League Cricket	2023	6	MI New York (2)
Zimbabwe	Stanbic Bank 20 Series	2006	5	Mashonaland Eagles (4)

Championships are correct to 26 January 2026.

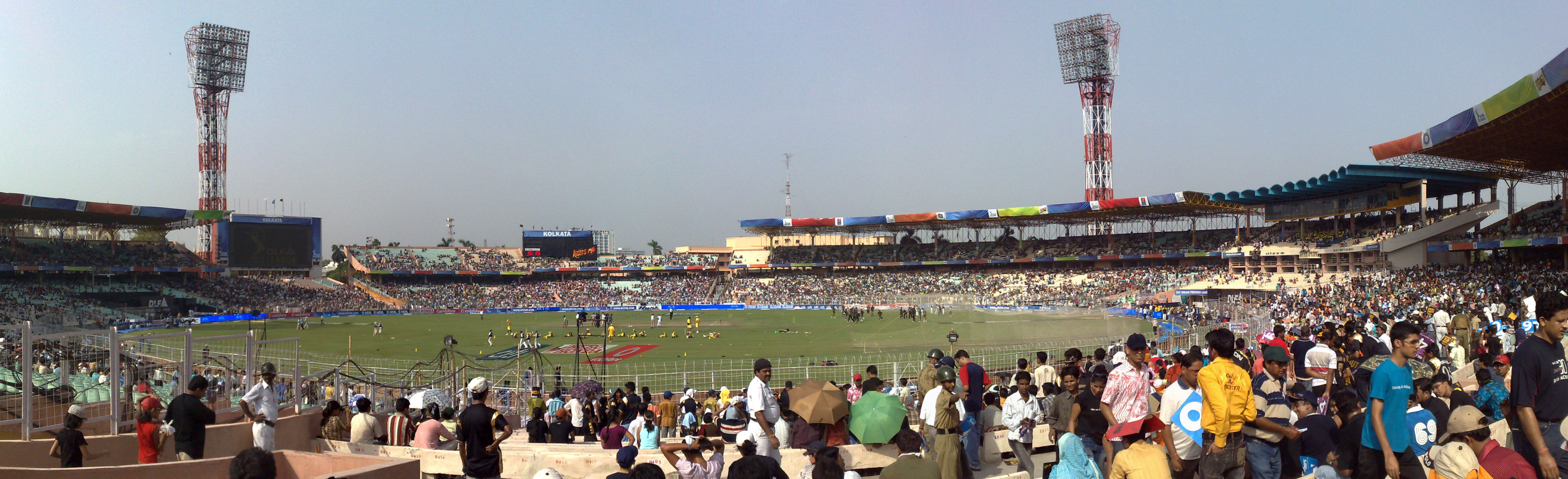
The Kolkata Knight Riders taking on the Chennai Super Kings at the Eden Gardens during India's IPL 01 (2008)

== See also ==
- List of Twenty20 cricket records
- List of Twenty20 International records
- 100-ball cricket
  - The Hundred (cricket)
- T10 cricket, the 10-over format of cricket
