= 100-ball cricket =

Format of cricket

100-ball cricket is a short form of cricket designed to attract new audiences to the game with simplified rules, which was originally created by the England and Wales Cricket Board (ECB) for its new city-based competition The Hundred. For statistical purposes it is designated as a Twenty20 competition.

The Hundred, the British cricket league that launched the 100-ball format

The 100-ball game has two teams each having a single innings, which is restricted to a maximum of 100 balls, and the match lasts approximately two and a half hours, shorter than the Twenty20 format.

Before the launch of the professional The Hundred competition in July 2021, the 100-ball format was trialled in several amateur local leagues across England.

== History ==
=== Origins ===
The new 100-ball format was born out of a proposal by the England and Wales Cricket Board (ECB) in 2016 to launch a new franchise cricket competition, similar to the Indian Premier League. At first it was expected that the competition would use the existing Twenty20 format.

Following discussions involving the ECB's marketing team, clubs were instead told in April 2018 that the competition would use an entirely new form of cricket designed to be simpler to follow and shorter to fit television schedules. The more detailed proposal was presented by the ECB to the chair and chief executives of the first-class counties and the MCC on 19 April 2018, and was unanimously supported by the board of the new competition. At first it was proposed that each innings would involve 15 six-ball overs and a final 10-ball over.

In February 2019, the ECB announced tweaks to the proposed rules of 100-ball cricket. The competition will instead contain 10 ten-ball overs, i.e. a change of ends after ten balls. A bowler will be delivering five or 10 consecutive balls. A bowler would deliver a maximum of 20 balls per innings. Power-play conditions were also announced.

=== Amateur competitions ===
Trial events using the format took place at The Purchasers annual cricket festival at Belmont House in Kent, and club level in England.

In November 2018, the Warwickshire Cricket Board and Warwickshire County Club launched the 100-ball format club level tournament, which is designed to revitalise Sunday cricket at clubs across the Midlands. Called the Warwickshire Sunday Smash, the 16 team tournament is split into three divisions, with each side playing each team both home and away, throughout June and July. The teams include Solihull Blossomfield Cricket Club, Knowle & Dorridge, Sutton Coldfield, Bedworth, Alcester & Ragley, Stratford upon Avon, Water Orton, Four Oaks Saints, Moseley Ashfield and Aston Manor, who are all members of the Midlands Club Cricket Conference. The winners of each league and the best second place progressing to the Semi-Finals Day. The Finals Day took place on 1 September 2019 at Edgbaston. Stratford Upon Avon beat Knowle & Dorridge to win the first 100-ball competition in the UK.

Shropshire County Club introduced the Swancote Energy Smash, which began in June 2019. It is a six-team tournament that has been divided into two groups, with games being played every Thursday night. The winners of each group is due to play in the inaugural final in early September 2019. The six teams are Shifnal, Claverley, Worfield, Bridgnorth, Chelmarsh and Wombourne.

In May 2021 Shropshire Cricket league launched two 100-ball knock out competitions, known as the Aaron's 100 and Aaron's Premier 100, involving 53 teams from across Shropshire and mid-Wales.

Cricket Wales launched the Cricket Wales U19's 100 Ball Cup for under 19 year olds. It started on 25 June 2021 and is due to end with the final on 13 August 2021 at Ynystawe Cricket Club.

The Cricket Paper National Girls U18 100 Ball Cup was established by Shrewsbury School. Originally known as the Shrewsbury School Girls U18 T20 in 2019, it is now a 100-ball cricket competition.

=== Professional competition ===
The first professional competition using the 100-ball format was The Hundred in July 2021. The Hundred involves eight men's and women's teams across England and Wales. The first professional match using the new format involved the women's teams of the Oval Invincibles and Manchester Originals who played each other at The Oval in London on 21 July 2021.

The Africa Cricket Association plans to hold an annual 100-ball competition to further boost the game within the continent.

== Format ==
100-ball cricket is a form of limited overs cricket, played by two teams each playing a single innings made up of 100 balls.

The format of the game is:

- 100 balls per innings
- A change of ends after 10 balls
- Bowlers deliver either five or 10 consecutive balls
- Each bowler can deliver a maximum of 20 balls per game
- A 25-ball powerplay start for each team
- Two fielders are allowed outside the initial 30-yard circle during the powerplay
- Teams will be able to call timeouts, as has been the case in the Indian Premier League since 2009, with each bowling side getting a strategic timeout of up to one and a half minutes
- The non-striker must return to their original end after a caught dismissal (Note: This applied only in The Hundred for the 2021 and 2022 seasons but was extended to all cricket from October 2022.)
- A simplified scoreboard is used
- In some cases, ties are broken by having each team bat for a 5-ball Super Over innings. Subsequent 5-ball innings may be played if the tie persists.

== Reactions ==
English journalist George Dobell wrote in 2018 that proposals for the new format outlined by the ECB were nothing more than a further step towards "fast-food cricket", whereas others support the proposals.

England's then Test captain, Joe Root, welcomed the ECB's plans for its new-team format in 2020. According to Root, it will attract a completely new audience. ODI and T20 captain, Eoin Morgan, had a similar opinion about this format. Former T20 captain Stuart Broad said he was hugely optimistic about the new format. Michael Vaughan also echoed Broad and stated that it will be a more appealing concept to broadcasters. Michael Atherton shared that a T20 match was originally to be completed in a 3-hour window and this can be achieved with the proposed format.

New Zealand all-rounder Jimmy Neesham was bemused on this move, asking why the England & Wales Cricket Board is trying something different when the current format is already so successful. Current limited overs specialists Dawid Malan and Mark Wood shared that in spite of the new format, T20s will still remain as the preference.

Former MCC chief Keith Bradshaw called the 100-ball tournament an innovation for innovation's sake, reasoning that the main reason behind this thought process is that the ECB could not exploit the T20 boom. The England and Wales Professional Cricketers Association shared that, overall, players were open to this new idea.

Meanwhile, Cricket Australia has no plans to tinker with its existing Big Bash League. It also shared a concern that the introduction of shorter formats is further ignoring Test cricket.
