= David East (cricketer) =

English cricketer

Personal information
- Full name: David Edward East
- Born: 27 July 1957 (age 69); Clapton, London, England
- Batting: Right-handed
- Role: Wicket-keeper

Domestic team information
- Years: Team
- 1981–1991: Essex

Career statistics
| Competition | FC | List A |
|---|---|---|
| Matches | 190 | 171 |
| Runs scored | 4553 | 889 |
| Batting average | 20.50 | 12.88 |
| 100s/50s | 4/17 | 0/0 |
| Top score | 134 | 43 |
| Balls bowled | 26 |
| Wickets |
| Bowling average |
| 5 wickets in innings |
| 10 wickets in match |
| Best bowling |
| Catches/stumpings | 480/53 | 174/19 |
- Source: Cricinfo, 19 July 2013

David Edward East (born 27 July 1959) is a former English cricketer who is the current CEO of the Emirates Cricket Board (ECB), the governing body of cricket in the United Arab Emirates.

As a player, East represented Essex as a wicket-keeper between 1981 and 1991. He was appointed commercial manager of Essex some time after the conclusion of his playing career, and in 2000 was made the club's CEO. East served in that position until 2012, when he left to take up a dual role in the UAE as CEO of the Emirates Cricket Board and CEO of the Abu Dhabi Cricket Club (ADCC). He signed a three-year contract extension with the ECB in 2016, at the same time ending his connection with the ADCC in order to devote more attention to the ECB role.
