= Limited overs cricket =

Version(s) of the sport of cricket

Limited overs cricket, also known as white ball cricket, is a version of the sport of cricket in which a match is generally completed within one day. There are a number of formats, including List A cricket (8-hour games), Twenty20 cricket (3-hour games), 100-ball cricket (2.5 hours) and T10 cricket (1.5 hour games). The name reflects the rule that in the match each team bowls a set maximum number of overs (sets of 6 legal balls), usually between 20 and 50, although shorter and longer forms of limited overs cricket have been played.

The concept contrasts with Test and first-class matches, which can take up to five days to complete. One-day cricket is popular with spectators as it can encourage aggressive, risky, entertaining batting, often results in cliffhanger endings, and ensures that a spectator can watch an entire match without committing to five days of continuous attendance.

== Structure ==
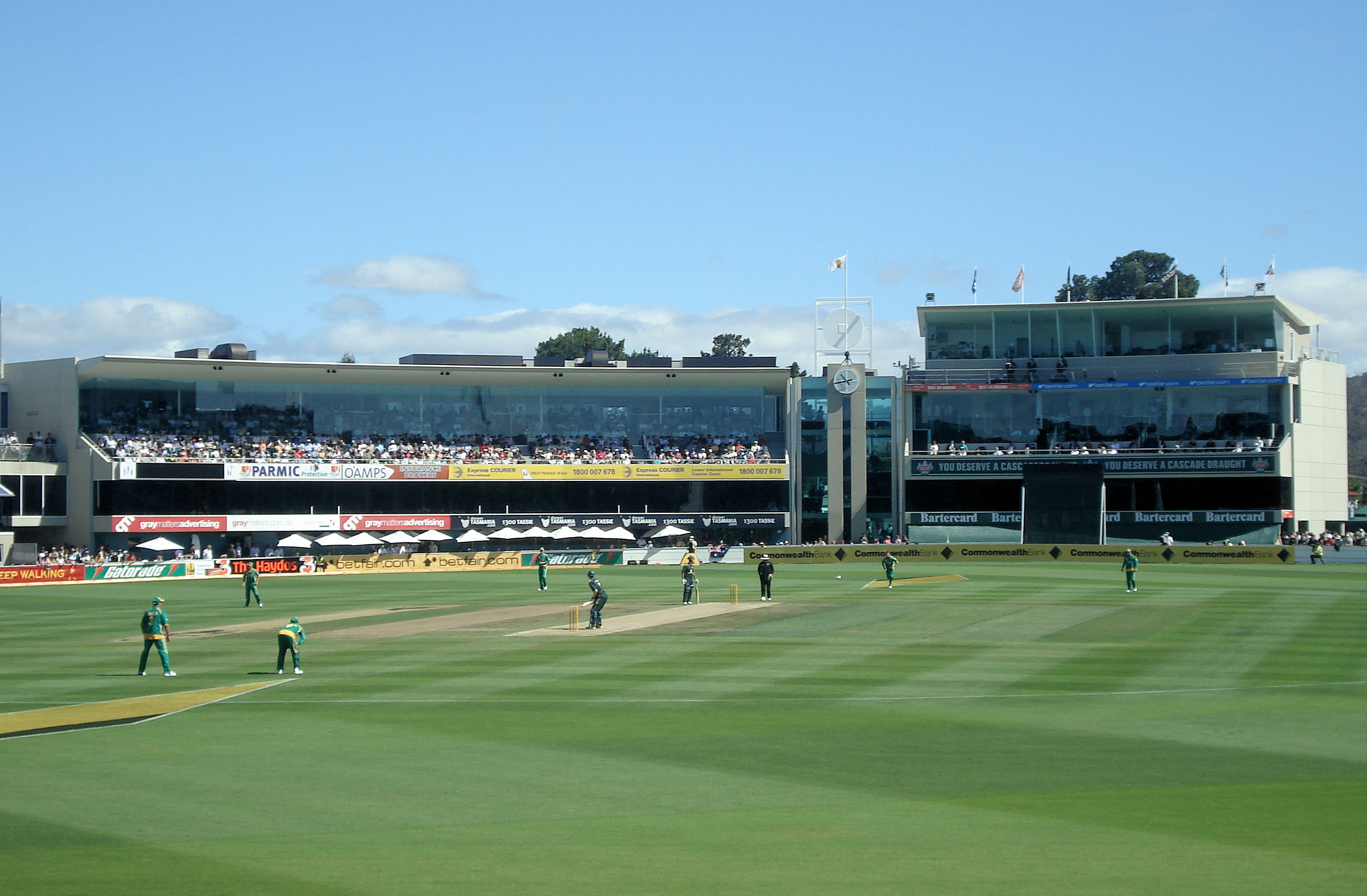
A one-day match at Bellerive Oval

Each team bats only once, and each innings is limited to a set number of overs, usually fifty in a One Day International and between forty and sixty in a List A. List A is a classification of the limited-overs (one-day) form of cricket, technically as the domestic level.

Because the innings is bounded by a fixed number of overs rather than by time, the state of the match can be read at any checkpoint within it, such as the score after ten overs, against a known number of deliveries still to come.

Despite its name, important one-day matches, international and domestic, often have two days set aside, the second day being a "reserve" day to allow more chance of the game being completed if a result is not possible on the first day (for instance if play is prevented or interrupted by rain).

=== Tiebreaker ===
In some tied limited-overs games, a Super Over is played, wherein each team bats for a one-over innings with two wickets in hand. A tied Super Over may be followed by another Super Over.

=== Player restrictions ===
==== Bowling restrictions ====
In almost all competitive one-day games, a restriction is placed on the number of overs that may be bowled by any one bowler. This is to prevent a side playing two top-class bowlers with extremely good stamina who can bowl throughout their opponents' innings. The usual limitation is set so that a side must include at least five players who bowl i.e. each bowler can only bowl 20% of the overs. For example, the usual limit for twenty-over cricket is four overs per bowler, for forty-over cricket eight per bowler and for fifty-over cricket ten per bowler. There are exceptions: Pro Cricket in the United States restricted bowlers to five overs each, thus leaving a side requiring only four bowlers.

=== White balls ===
Limited over cricket is usually played with white balls rather than the traditional red balls. This was introduced because the team batting second is likely to need to play under floodlights and a white ball is easier to see under these conditions. The white balls are supposed to be otherwise identical to traditional balls, but according to BBC Sport, some cricketers claim that the harder surface causes white balls to swing more.

== History ==
The idea for a one-day, limited 50-over cricket tournament, was first played in the inaugural match of the All India Pooja Cricket Tournament in 1951 at Tripunithura in Kochi, Kerala. It is thought to be the brain child of KV Kelappan Thampuran, a former cricketer and the first Secretary of the Kerala Cricket Association. The first limited-overs tournament between first-class English teams was the Midlands Counties Knockout Cup, which took place in May 1962. Played with 65-over innings, the Cup was organised by Mike Turner, secretary of the Leicestershire County Cricket Club. The competition was small, with three other county teams participating in addition to Leicestershire. However, it drew commercial television coverage and positive commentary by journalists, who noted the potential to attract sponsors and spectators amid declining attendance levels.

The following year, the first full-scale one-day competition between first-class teams was played, the knock-out Gillette Cup, won by Sussex. The number of overs was reduced to 60 for the 1964 season. League one-day cricket also began in England, when the John Player Sunday League was started in 1969 with 40-over matches. Both these competitions continued, with changes in sponsorship, till 2010, when they were replaced by the ECB 40. This was in turn replaced by the 50-over One-Day Cup in 2014.

The first Limited Overs International (LOI) or One-Day International (ODI) match was played between Australia and England in Melbourne on 5 January 1971, and the quadrennial cricket World Cup began in 1975. Many of the "packaging" innovations, such as coloured clothing, were as a result of World Series Cricket, a "rebel" series set up outside the cricketing establishment by Australian entrepreneur Kerry Packer. For more details, see History of cricket.

Twenty20, a curtailed form of one-day cricket with 20 overs (120 legal balls) per side, was first played in England in 2003. It has proven very popular, and several Twenty20 matches have been played between national teams. It makes several changes to the usual laws of cricket, including the use of a Super Over (one or more additional overs played by each team) to decide the result of tied matches.

100-ball cricket (2.5-hour games), another form of one-day cricket with 100 deliveries per side, launched in England in 2021. It is designed to further shorten game time and to attract a new audience. It makes further changes to the usual laws of cricket, such as the involvement of overs that last 5 balls each.

There are now also T10 leagues with a format of 10 overs per side (resulting in 90-minute games). The Emirates Cricket Board also launched Ninety–90 Bash, an upcoming annual franchise-based 90-ball cricket league in the United Arab Emirates.

== One Day Internationals ==
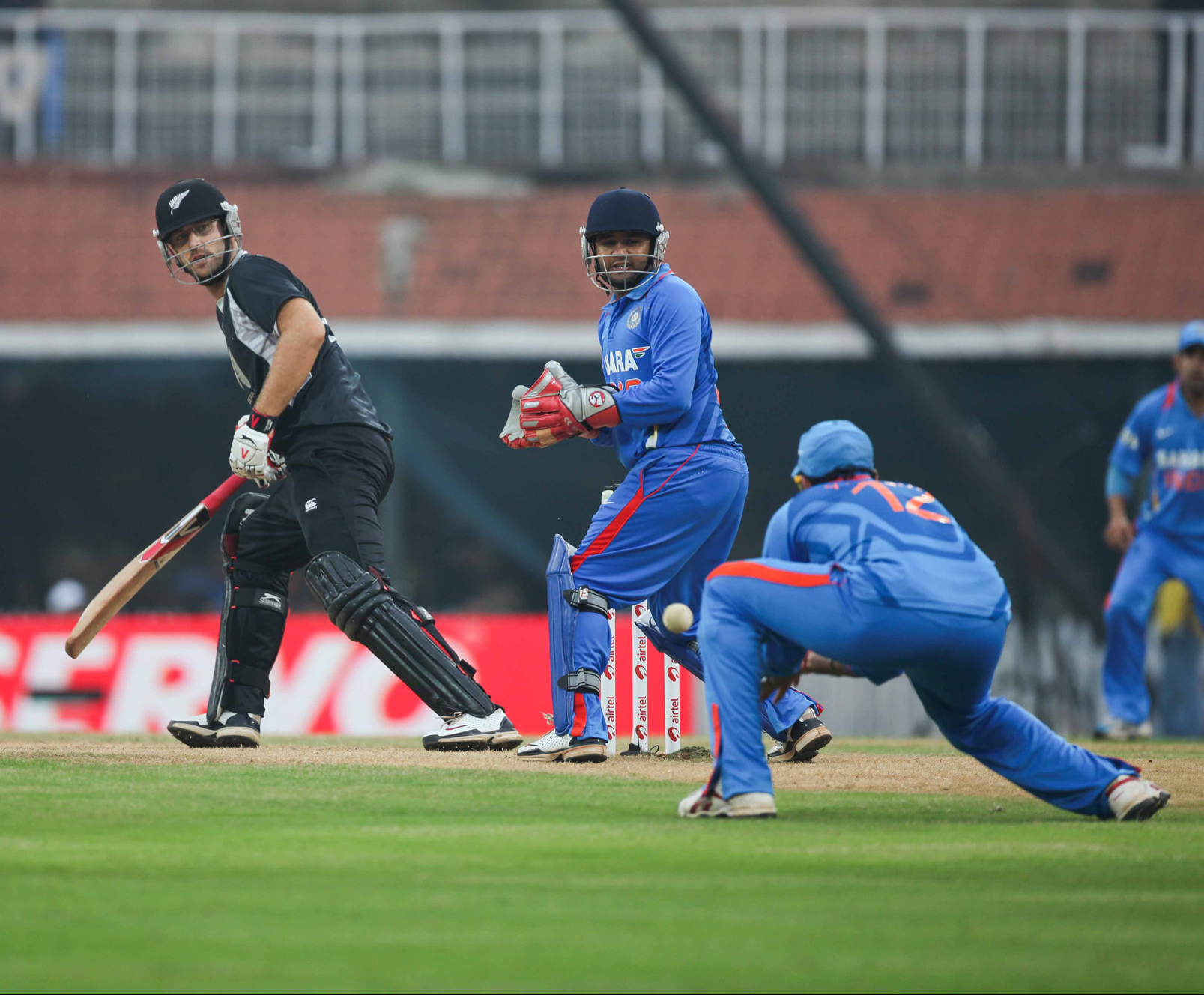
Chennai hosted an ODI match between India and New Zealand in 2010. The New Zealand batsman is in black, and India in blue are the fielding team.

One Day International matches are usually played in brightly coloured clothing often in a "day-night" format where the first innings of the day occurs in the afternoon and the second occurs under stadium lights.

=== One Day International tournaments ===
In the early days of ODI cricket, the number of overs was generally 60 overs per side, and matches were also played with 40, 45 or 55 overs per side, but now it has been uniformly fixed at 50 overs.

Every four years, the Cricket World Cup involves all the Test-playing nations and other national sides who qualify through the ICC World Cup Qualifier. It usually consists of round-robin stages, followed by semi-finals and a final. The International Cricket Council (ICC) determines the venue far in advance.

The ICC Champions Trophy involves all the Test-playing nations, and is held between World Cups. It usually consists of a round-robin group stage, semifinals, and a final.

Each Test-playing country often hosts triangular tournaments, between the host nation and two touring sides. There is usually a round-robin group, and then the leading two teams play each other in a final, or sometimes a best-of-three final. When there is only one touring side, there is still often a best-of-five or best-of-seven series of limited overs matches.

The ICC World Cricket League is an ODI competition for national teams with Associate or Affiliate status.

== List A status ==
List A cricket is a classification of the limited-overs (one-day) form of the sport of cricket. Much as domestic first-class cricket is the level below international Test match cricket, so List A cricket is the domestic level of one-day cricket below One Day Internationals. Twenty20 matches do not qualify for the present.

Most cricketing nations have some form of domestic List A competition. The number of overs in List A cricket ranges from forty to sixty overs per side.

The Association of Cricket Statisticians and Historians created this category for the purpose of providing an equivalent to first-class cricket, to allow the generation of career records and statistics for comparable one-day matches. Only the more important one-day competitions in each country, plus matches against a touring Test team, are included. The categorisation of cricket matches as "List A" was not officially endorsed by the International Cricket Council until 2006, when the ICC announced that it and its member associations would be determining this classification in a manner similar to that done for first class matches.

Matches that qualify as List A:

- One Day Internationals (ODIs)
- Other international matches.
- Premier one-day tournaments in permanent test playing nations
- Official matches of a Test nations against first-class teams
- Official international matches between (officially) second-tier ODI teams

Matches that do not qualify as List A:

- World Cup warm-up matches
- Other Tourist matches (for example, against first-class teams that are not part of the main domestic first-class competition, such as universities)
- Festival and friendly matches
- One Day tournaments in not test playing nations.

== Domestic competitions ==
Domestic one-day competitions exist in almost every country where cricket is played. The table below lists the limited overs tournaments that take place in each full member nation.

Country	Tournament	Format
Afghanistan
Afghanistan	Ghazi Amanullah Khan Regional One Day Tournament	50 overs
Afghanistan	Green Afghanistan One Day Cup	50 overs
Afghanistan	Shpageeza Cricket League	20 overs
Australia
Australia	Marsh One-Day Cup	50 overs
Australia	Big Bash League	20 overs
Australia	Women's National Cricket League	50 overs
Australia	Women's Big Bash League	20 overs
Bangladesh
Bangladesh	Dhaka Premier Division Cricket League	50 overs
Bangladesh	Bangladesh Premier League	20 overs
Bangladesh	Dhaka Premier Division Twenty20 Cricket League	20 overs
Bangladesh	Bangladesh Women's National Cricket League	50 overs
England
England	Royal London One-Day Cup	50 overs
England	T20 Blast	20 overs
England	The Hundred	100-ball
England	Rachael Heyhoe Flint Trophy	50 overs
England	Charlotte Edwards Cup	20 overs
England	Women's Twenty20 Cup	20 overs
India
India	Vijay Hazare Trophy	50 overs
India	Deodhar Trophy	50 overs
India	Indian Premier League	20 overs
India	Syed Mushtaq Ali Trophy	20 overs
India	Women's Senior One Day Trophy	50 overs
India	Senior Women's Challenger Trophy	50 overs
India	Women's Senior T20 Trophy	20 overs
India	Women's Senior T20 Challenger Trophy	20 overs
India	Women's Premier League	20 overs
Ireland
Ireland	Inter-Provincial Cup	50 overs
Ireland	Inter-Provincial Trophy	20 overs
Ireland	Women's Super Series	50/20 overs
New Zealand
New Zealand	The Ford Trophy	50 overs
New Zealand	Men's Super Smash	20 overs
New Zealand	Hallyburton Johnstone Shield	50 overs
New Zealand	Women's Super Smash	20 overs
Pakistan
Pakistan	Pakistan Cup	50 overs
Pakistan	National T20 Cup	20 overs
Pakistan	Pakistan Super League	20 overs
Pakistan	Pakistan Women's One Day Cup	50 overs
Pakistan	PCB Triangular Twenty20 Women's Tournament	20 overs
South Africa
South Africa	CSA One-Day Cup	50 overs
South Africa	CSA Provincial T20 Cup	20 overs
South Africa	CSA T20 League	20 overs
South Africa	Women's Provincial Programme	50 overs
South Africa	Women's Provincial T20 Competition	20 overs
South Africa	Women's T20 Super League	20 overs
Sri Lanka
Sri Lanka	National Super League	50 overs
Sri Lanka	SLC Invitational T20 League	20 overs
Sri Lanka	Lanka Premier League	20 overs
Sri Lanka	Sri Lanka Women's Division One Tournament	50 overs
Sri Lanka	Sri Lanka Women's Invitation T20 Tournament	20 overs
West Indies
West Indies	Super50 Cup	50 overs
West Indies	Caribbean Premier League	20 overs
West Indies	The 6ixty	10 overs
West Indies	Women's Super50 Cup	50 overs
West Indies	Twenty20 Blaze	20 overs
West Indies	Women's Caribbean Premier League	20 overs
Zimbabwe
Zimbabwe	Pro50 Championship	50 overs
Zimbabwe	Stanbic Bank 20 Series	20 overs
Zimbabwe	Fifty50 Challenge	50 overs
Zimbabwe	Women's T20 Cup	20 overs

== One-day records ==
The world record for the highest innings total in any List A limited overs match is 574 for 6 by Bihar against Arunachal Pradesh in Ranchi on 24 December 2025. On 17 June 2022, England set a new international record, totalling 498 for 4 against Netherlands at Amstelveen. The lowest ever total is 18 by West Indies U-19 against Barbados at Blairmont in 2007. The record low score in ODIs is 35, by Zimbabwe against Sri Lanka in Harare on 25 April 2004 and United States against Nepal in Kirtipur on 12 February 2020.

The most runs scored by both sides in any List A limited overs match is 872: Australia, batting first, scored 434 for four in 50 overs, and yet were beaten by South Africa who scored 438 for nine with a ball to spare during their One Day International at Johannesburg in 2006.

The highest individual innings is 272 by Narayan Jagadeesan for Tamil Nadu against Arunachal Pradesh in Bengaluru in 2022. The best bowling figures are eight for 10 by Shahbaz Nadeem for Jharkhand against Ranchi at Chennai in 2018. The highest international individual innings is by Rohit Sharma who scored 264. The highest score in any formal limited overs match is believed to be United's 630 for five against Bay Area in a 45 overs match at Richmond, California in August 2006.

The most runs in an over was scored by Herschelle Gibbs of the South African cricket team when, in the 2007 Cricket World Cup in the West Indies, he hit 6 sixes in one over bowled by Daan van Bunge of the Netherlands. This record is shared by Yuvraj Singh of India who achieved this feat in the 2007 ICC World Twenty20 in South Africa, he hit 6 sixes in an over bowled by Stuart Broad of England. This was later also achieved by Kieron Pollard, Jaskaran Malhotra, Dipendra Singh Airee, and Darius Visser in international cricket.

== See also ==
- T10 League
- Duckworth–Lewis–Stern method

== Sources ==
- Gilchrist, Adam (1999). One-Day Cricket: Playing the One-Day Game. Harper Collins Publishers. ISBN 0-7322-6713-7.
- Banerjee, Joydeep; Karmakar, Rajat (21 November 2013). "আনাচে–কানাচে: ময়দান ও ক্লাব | ক্যালকাটা ক্রিকেট অ্যান্ড ফুটবল ক্লাব (সিসিএফসি)" [Maidan & Club: Calcutta Cricket and Football Club (CCFC)]. archives.anandabazar.com (in Bengali). Kolkata: Anandabazar Patrika. Archived from the original on 6 February 2020.
