= Short form cricket =

Shortened versions of the sport of cricket

Short form cricket is a collective term for several modified forms of the sport of cricket, with playing times significantly shorter than more traditional forms of the game.

A typical short form cricket match can be completed within two to three hours, compared to 7–8 hours for a one-day cricket match, or five days for a Test match. They generally are limited overs cricket matches, with each team batting for a maximum of 5 to 20 overs (30 to 120 legal balls) depending on the format.

These short forms of cricket have been developed locally by various authorities, to fill a perceived marketing vacancy for a form of the sport which can be completed in a few hours, rather than a full day. They tend to emphasise the more "exciting" aspects of cricket as seen by more casual observers of the game, which includes aggressive batting and fast run scoring. In this regard, they are successful, as shortened forms of cricket attract crowds of spectators who might not otherwise attend a cricket match.

== T20 Cricket ==
Although twenty-over cricket matches have existed for decades and remain the most popular amateur form of the game, the professional format Twenty20 cricket was introduced by the England and Wales Cricket Board (ECB) in 2003. It is a form of one-day cricket in which each team bats for a maximum of only 20 overs, contrasting with 50 overs for a standard one-day match. This means a game can be completed in about three hours, making it more palatable for children and families than longer matches. The players can also rest.

The English first-class counties participate in a Twenty20 Cup competition annually. Many games are played in twilight, again to enhance family spectator appeal. They also feature numerous musical 'stings' for exciting events, such as the dismissal of a batsman, or the hitting of a boundary. Such fours and sixes are made easier to achieve by the shortening of the boundaries.

Major differences from the Laws of Cricket include:

- Should a bowler deliver a no-ball, his next delivery is designated a free-hit, from which the batsman can only be dismissed through a run-out, as is the case for the original no-ball.
- Bowlers may bowl a maximum of only 4 overs per innings, as is standard for 20-over cricket.
- Umpires may award 5-run penalties at their discretion if they believe either team is wasting time.

So far, Twenty20 has proved very popular with the public. On 15 July 2004, Middlesex vs. Surrey (the first Twenty20 game to be held at Lord's) attracted a crowd of 26,500, the largest attendance for any county game other than a one-day final since 1953.

On 5 August 2004, New Zealand Women defeated England Women in the first international Twenty20 match, played at Hove in England.

On 12 January 2005, Australia's first Twenty20 game was played at the WACA Ground between the Western Warriors and the Victorian Bushrangers. It drew a sellout crowd of 20,700 – the largest seen at the ground for many years.

On 17 February 2005, Australia defeated New Zealand in the first men's international Twenty20 match, played at Eden Park in Auckland.

== 100-ball cricket ==
The 100-ball game was first proposed by the ECB in 2016, with the first club level games starting in England 2019. It was first played at the professional level by a new city-based competition called The Hundred, with 8 teams from England and Wales, that started in 2021.

== T10 cricket ==
Ten-overs per team cricket matches introduced by T10 Sports Management. The company started a T10 tournament called Abu Dhabi T10 in the United Arab Emirates in 2017. In August 2018, the International Cricket Council (ICC) officially sanctioned the league.

In October 2019, Cricket West Indies decided to host women's exhibition T10 matches in the lead-up to the CPL 2019 final.

== 90-ball cricket ==
Ninety–90 Bash, also known as the 90/90, is an upcoming annual franchise-based 90-ball cricket league in the United Arab Emirates, with each team facing 15 overs. The first edition of the tournament is planned to be held in 2022.

== Evening cricket ==
Amateur evening cricket is a version of T20 cricket that is played informally throughout the UK and the world. The rules are similar to those of Twenty20 cricket, with some modifications designed to speed the game up and to ensure that the game cannot be dominated by a small group of skilled players.

As with orthodox 20-over cricket, each team faces 120 deliveries, however instead of being split into 20 six-ball overs, these are split into 15 eight-ball overs. This reduces the amount of time spent moving between overs and enables the same amount of cricket to be played in a shorter time.

In contrast to orthodox cricket rules, an extra ball is not awarded following a wide or no-ball, in order to save time. Instead, two runs are added to the score instead of the usual one run. This rule does not usually apply for the last over of each innings to ensure that no strategic advantage can be gained from the deliberate bowling of a wide ball.

The fielding side is limited to three overs per bowler, or in some formats only two overs. This ensures that the majority of each team is required to bowl. The tactical implications of this rule for the fielding team captain are important as he must carefully decide when to bowl his experienced and inexperienced bowlers.

Batsmen are required to retire upon reaching a pre-agreed personal score, usually 25 or 30. Should the side be dismissed with a number of batsmen retired, they may then return to the crease in the order they retired. It is not unprecedented for a batsman to retire for a second or even third time in one innings. This rule ensures that the majority of a team will get a bat, and hence ensures the emphasis on the entire team both getting involved and being able to contribute to the final score.

This format of cricket is played in the UK and used to introduce new or inexperienced players to the sport. The outcome of the game is frequently determined by the contributions of all players. It is a format used by amateur cricketers.

== Six-a-side cricket ==
Six-a-side cricket is a very short form of the sport designed to be played by teams of only six players. Each team receives one innings, with a maximum of only five overs. Naturally, with far fewer fielders, runs are much easier to score, and the sixes matches are typically frenetic affairs. As the games last less than an hour, sixes cricket is typically played in a tournament format with multiple teams competing at the same ground.

Other major changes to the Laws of Cricket include:

- Each player on a side is permitted to bowl a maximum of one over.
- Wides and no-balls score two extra runs each.
- If five wickets fall, the last batsman bats on. The last batsman to get out remains on the field as a non-batting runner, and the batsmen swap ends whenever the runner ends up on strike.
- A batsman who reaches or passes a certain number of runs, often 30 or 31 or sometimes 50, must retire "not out". If one of the last pair of batsmen is out, a retired batsman may come in and resume his innings.
- In some formats of the game, hitting a 'six' counts as 10 runs, and striking a 'four' counts as six runs.

The most prominent six-a-side international cricket tournament is the Hong Kong Cricket Sixes and is held at the Kowloon Cricket Club and Mission Road Ground, Mong Kok comprising between eight and twelve teams. Organised by Cricket Hong Kong, it is sanctioned by the International Cricket Council. The tournament is designed for television viewing, with rules and a venue that encourage aggressive batting and high scoring. Because every player (except the wicket-keeper) is required to bowl one over, the format suits all-rounders. The tournament first occurred in 1992.

Six-a-side cricket, or the similar Eight-a-side cricket, is a popular tournament format used in the UK that came to international prominence with the high-profile Hong Kong tournament.

The Six-A-Side-Cricket Federation of India was founded in 2002. It hosts inter-school and inter-university tournaments; it also organizes Sub-Junior, Junior, Youth, Senior, Federation Cup, and Zonal tournaments.

== Cricket Max ==
Cricket Max is a defunct form of cricket invented in New Zealand by former New Zealand cricketer and captain Martin Crowe which was played primarily by New Zealand first-class cricket teams in an annual competition. International matches were also played between the New Zealand Max Blacks and England (1997), West Indies (2000) and India (2002). It was essentially a very short form of test cricket, with each team permitted two innings, but a maximum of only 10 overs for each innings.

Other major differences from the Laws of Cricket include:

- Each side bats two innings of a maximum of 10 overs each.
- Batsmen may not be out from a no-ball as usual, and also the next ball bowled after a no-ball. This is intended to encourage aggressive batting on the "free hit" ball.
- Wides score 2 extras instead of 1.
- Bowlers may not bowl more than 4 overs per match. These may be distributed between the two innings in any way.
- The field is marked with trapezoidal "Max" zones, one at each end of the field, beginning 60 metres from the striker's wicket, where the trapezoid is 40 metres wide, and extending to the boundary, where the trapezoid is 50 metres wide. Any ball hit into the Max zone doubles the number of runs scored from that ball, whether by running between the wickets, or a boundary four or six. Fielders may not be in the Max zone as the ball is bowled. Only the Max zone in front of the striker is valid for all these rules.
- The New Zealand domestic version of Cricket Max also included the use of 4 stumps, instead of 3, at each end of the cricket pitch. This was designed to help bowlers dismiss batsmen, as a batsman could not be dismissed LBW .This idea was scrapped for the Super Max version unofficial international matches of the format with the traditional three stumps per and LBW restored.

== Super 8s ==
Super 8s is a defunct short form of cricket devised by Greg Chappell for the Australian Cricket Board in 1996. The format was conceived as a way to financially reward the top-class domestic cricketers in Australia whose opportunities of making it into the significantly higher-paying Australian national side were limited. Matches were played outside the regular cricket season during the Australian winter at rugby stadiums with smaller rectangular fields such as Willows Sports Complex in Townsville.
An international tournament was held in Kuala Lumpur, Malaysia in July 1996.

The changes from the usual Laws of Cricket include:

- Eight players per side
- 14 over matches
- All players except the wicketkeeper must bowl a minimum of one over, but no more than three overs
- A boundary 6 is worth 8 runs
- Batsmen must retire at 50 runs, but are allowed to return if balls are left in innings
- Last batsmen allowed to continue to end of innings, even after 7 wickets have fallen
