= Ninety–90 Bash =

Cricket tournament

- Official logo of Ninety–90 Bash
- Countries: United Arab Emirates
- Administrator: Emirates Cricket Board
- Headquarters: Abu Dhabi
- Format: 90-ball cricket
- First edition: 2022
- Latest edition: 2023
- Next edition: 2024
- Tournament format: Two group games followed by knock-out
- Website: emiratescricket.com

Ninety–90 Bash, also known as the 90/90, is an upcoming annual franchise-based 90-ball cricket league in the United Arab Emirates. It will be slightly shorter than The Hundred which is a 100-ball cricket format founded by the England and Wales Cricket Board (ECB). The first edition of the tournament is planned to be held in 2022. It will originally be the extended version of the T10 League, a Ten10 cricket league in the United Arab Emirates launched and owned by T Ten Sports Management. Matches will be 15-overs per side and the duration of each match will be approximately 135 minutes (2 hours and 15 minutes). The league is officially approved by the Emirates Cricket Board. Originally, in August 2019, the tournament was proposed to be started from 2020, with an aim to grow the popularity of cricket in UAE. It is now scheduled to be held from May to June 2022.
