= George Dobell =

English cricket journalist

George Dobell (born 4 May 1972) is an English cricket journalist.

Dobell is chief cricket writer at The Cricketer. He was formerly senior cricket correspondent at Cricinfo. He has written for SPIN Magazine, and The Cricketer as well as The Guardian, The Times and the Birmingham Post. He has contributed to the cricket almanac Wisden.

Dobell was the ghost writer for the autobiography of former England and Warwickshire cricketer Jonathan Trott entitled Unguarded.

On 10 October 2018, Dobell was included in the list of the most respected journalists working in Britain as published by the National Council for the Training of Journalists.

Dobell regularly appears on the Switch Hit cricket podcast as well as guesting on the Lord's podcast, and the One Stump Short podcast.

ESPNcricinfo have a regular video feature at the end of a Test match day's play entitled Polite Enquiries in which Dobell and his colleagues (such as Jarrod Kimber and Melinda Farrell) answer viewers' questions. Dobell regularly appears on the Test Match Special journalist panel at lunch on the final day of a Test match. He has appeared regularly on the Sky Sports programme Cricket Writers on TV, Talksport, and on BBC Radio 5 Live.

== Personal life ==
Dobell possesses both British and New Zealand passports, the latter by virtue of his mother. As a child he watched a lot of Somerset County Cricket Club matches and his favourite players were Ian Botham and Viv Richards.
