= Ramji Srinivasan =

Indian cricket coach

Ramji Srinivasan is the former Head Strength and Conditioning Coach of the India national cricket team. He is the first one who served World Cup-winning Indian cricket team as Strength and Conditioning(S&C) coach.

== Early life ==
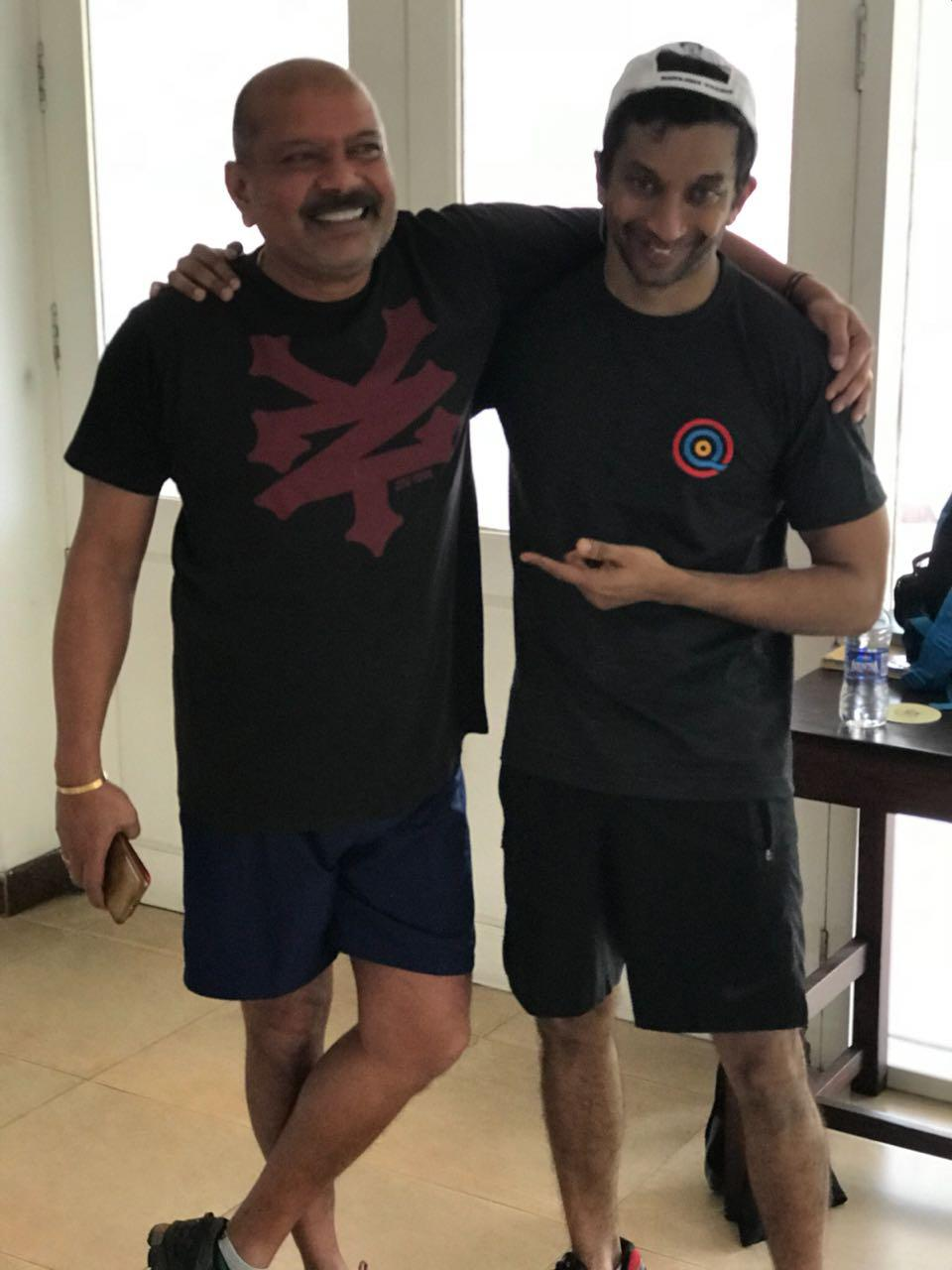
Ramji Srinivasan with F1 Racer Narain Karthikeyan

Ramji Srinivasan was born in Chennai on 24 August 1967 to an orthodox Brahmin family. His parents are professor Srinivasan and Radha.

Srinivasan was educated at Asan Memorial Senior Secondary School and a college in Loyola, with physics as major. He went on to study resistance training in Adelaide, Australia, and Swiss Ball training from Paul Chek and periodisation technique at Tudor Bompa Institute

He is married to Vidya and has two daughters named Malaveeka and Nayonathara.

Srinivasan was a state- and national-level sprinter with 100 metres (330 ft) and long jump as his main events, in which he was a champion in both events at the national level. He was considered one of the best in India in his age group.

Srinivasan currently owns Sports Dynamix sports performance centre in Chennai.

== Career ==
Srinivasan helped improve the fitness of the Indian cricket team and several leading athletes, including Virat Kohli, Ravichandran Ashwin, MS Dhoni, Sachin Tendulkar, Dinesh Karthik, Sharath Kamal and Sathiyan Gnanasekaran. He is also the former strength and conditioning coach of the Indian Premier League (IPL) team Chennai Super Kings.
