= Cricket in the United Arab Emirates =

- Country: United Arab Emirates
- Governing body: Emirates Cricket Board
- National team(s): United Arab Emirates
- Registered players: 1990 (By ICC)

International competitions
- ICC World Cricket League; ICC Intercontinental Cup; ICC Intercontinental Cup One-Day; ICC World Twenty20 Qualifier

Cricket is a popular sport in the United Arab Emirates. UAE has participated in various competition by International Cricket Council (ICC) and is an associate member of the ICC. The country will also host few games for UAE cricket team (Home Leg) and Afghanistan cricket team at Sharjah Cricket Association Stadium, Sharjah in 2011–13 ICC Intercontinental Cup and 2011–13 ICC Intercontinental Cup One-Day. The 2012 ICC World Twenty20 Qualifier is also scheduled in the United Arab Emirates at Dubai International Cricket Stadium, Dubai, ICC Global Cricket Academy (Oval 2), Dubai and Sharjah Cricket Stadium, Sharjah. Formerly Sheikh Zayed Stadium in Abu Dhabi, Dubai Sports City Cricket Stadium in Dubai and Sharjah Cricket Association Stadium in Sharjah were used by Pakistan for their neutral matches due to security concerns after the 2009 attack on the Sri Lanka national cricket team, but international cricket later returned to Pakistan.

== History ==
The 1996 Pepsi Sharjah Cup was held at Sharjah Cricket Association Stadium in Sharjah where Test Cricket playing nations like India, Pakistan and South Africa have played. The Sharjah Cricket Association Stadium in Sharjah has hosted matches of 2004 ICC Intercontinental Cup, 2005 ICC Intercontinental Cup and 2007–08 ICC Intercontinental Cup. The Country hosted 2011 ICC World Cricket League Division Two matches. The venues for this competition were DSC Cricket Stadium and ICC Global Cricket Academy (Oval 1 and Oval 2). The host won this competition by defeating Namibia. The UAE were promoted to 2011–13 ICC Intercontinental Cup and 2011–13 ICC Intercontinental Cup One-Day. The 2010 ICC World Twenty20 Qualifier were held in United Arab Emirates. The venues used for this tournament were Sheikh Zayed Stadium in Abu Dhabi and Dubai Sports City Cricket Stadium in Dubai. Afghanistan won the tournament by beating Ireland by 8 wickets in Dubai.
